= UEFA Euro 2016 qualifying =

European football competition

Tournament details
- Dates: 7 September 2014 – 17 November 2015
- Teams: 53

Tournament statistics
- Matches played: 268
- Goals scored: 694 (2.59 per match) (Note: The goal tally takes into account the original result of fixtures that were subsequently forfeited, not the awarded scoreline.)
- Attendance: 5,735,330 (21,400 per match)
- Top scorer: (Poland) Robert Lewandowski (13 goals)

The UEFA Euro 2016 qualifying tournament was a football competition that was played from September 2014 to November 2015 to determine the 23 UEFA member men's national teams joining the automatically qualified host team France in the UEFA Euro 2016 final tournament.

A total of 53 national teams participated in this qualifying process, with Gibraltar taking part for the first time. The draw took place at the Palais des Congrès Acropolis, Nice, on 23 February 2014.

== Qualified teams ==
Team qualified for UEFA Euro 2016 Team failed to qualify

Team	Qualified as	Qualified on	Previous appearances in tournament (Note: Bold indicates champion for that year. Italic indicates host for that year.)
France	Host	28 May 2010	8 (1960, **1984**, 1992, 1996, **2000**, 2004, 2008, 2012)
England	Group E winner	5 September 2015	8 (1968, 1980, 1988, 1992, 1996, 2000, 2004, 2012)
Czech Republic (Note: From 1960 to 1980, both the Czech Republic and Slovakia competed as Czechoslovakia.)	Group A winner	6 September 2015	8 (1960, **1976**, 1980, 1996, 2000, 2004, 2008, 2012)
Iceland	Group A runner-up	6 September 2015	0 (debut)
Austria	Group G winner	8 September 2015	1 (2008)
Northern Ireland	Group F winner	8 October 2015	0 (debut)
Portugal	Group I winner	8 October 2015	6 (1984, 1996, 2000, 2004, 2008, 2012)
Spain	Group C winner	9 October 2015	9 (**1964**, 1980, 1984, 1988, 1996, 2000, 2004, **2008**, **2012**)
Switzerland	Group E runner-up	9 October 2015	3 (1996, 2004, 2008)
Italy	Group H winner	10 October 2015	8 (**1968**, 1980, 1988, 1996, 2000, 2004, 2008, 2012)
Belgium	Group B winner	10 October 2015	4 (1972, 1980, 1984, 2000)
Wales	Group B runner-up	10 October 2015	0 (debut)
Romania	Group F runner-up	11 October 2015	4 (1984, 1996, 2000, 2008)
Albania	Group I runner-up	11 October 2015	0 (debut)
Germany (Note: From 1972 to 1988, Germany competed as West Germany.)	Group D winner	11 October 2015	11 (**1972**, 1976, **1980**, 1984, 1988, 1992, **1996**, 2000, 2004, 2008, 2012)
Poland	Group D runner-up	11 October 2015	2 (2008, 2012)
Russia (Note: From 1960 to 1988, Russia competed as the Soviet Union, and in 1992 as CIS.)	Group G runner-up	12 October 2015	10 (**1960**, 1964, 1968, 1972, 1988, 1992, 1996, 2004, 2008, 2012)
Slovakia	Group C runner-up	12 October 2015	3 (1960, **1976**, 1980)
Croatia	Group H runner-up	13 October 2015	4 (1996, 2004, 2008, 2012)
Turkey	Best third-placed team	13 October 2015	3 (1996, 2000, 2008)
Hungary	Play-off winner	15 November 2015	2 (1964, 1972)
Republic of Ireland	Play-off winner	16 November 2015	2 (1988, 2012)
Sweden	Play-off winner	17 November 2015	5 (1992, 2000, 2004, 2008, 2012)
Ukraine	Play-off winner	17 November 2015	1 (2012)

== Format ==
All UEFA member associations were eligible to compete in the qualifying competition, with the host team France qualifying directly to the finals tournament. The other 53 teams were drawn into eight groups of six teams (Groups A–H) and one group of five teams (Group I). The group winners, runners-up, and the best third-placed team (with the results against the sixth-placed team discarded) directly qualified to the finals. The eight remaining third-placed teams contested two-legged play-offs to determine the last four qualifiers for the finals.

=== Seeding system ===
Sides were seeded according to the UEFA national team coefficient rankings, which were announced along with the draw procedure and final tournament match schedule after the 23–24 January Executive Committee meeting in Nyon. For the qualifying group stage, the teams were seeded into six pots (Pots 1–5 with 9 teams and Pot 6 with 8 teams) for the qualifying group stage draw according to the UEFA national team coefficient rankings, with the title holders (Spain) automatically seeded into Pot 1. Each nation's coefficient was generated by calculating:

- 40% of the average ranking points per game earned in the 2014 FIFA World Cup qualifying stage.
- 40% of the average ranking points per game earned in the UEFA Euro 2012 qualifying stage and final tournament.
- 20% of the average ranking points per game earned in the 2010 FIFA World Cup qualifying stage and final tournament.

UEFA stated that nations with the largest markets in terms of contribution to the European Qualifiers revenue would be drawn into one of the groups containing six teams, including England, Spain, Germany, Italy, and the Netherlands. UEFA also stated in their regulations that "the teams drawn into the group of five teams will have France added to their group for the purpose of playing centralized friendlies". However, these friendlies did not count in the qualifying group standings.

For the play-offs the four ties were determined by draw, including the order of the two legs of each tie. The teams were seeded for the play-off draw according to the UEFA national team coefficient rankings updated after the completion of the group stage. Each nation's coefficient was generated by calculating:

- 40% of the average ranking points per game earned in the UEFA Euro 2016 qualifying group stage.
- 40% of the average ranking points per game earned in the 2014 FIFA World Cup qualifying stage and final tournament.
- 20% of the average ranking points per game earned in the UEFA Euro 2012 qualifying stage and final tournament.

=== Tiebreakers ===
If two or more teams were equal on points on completion of the group matches, the following tie-breaking criteria were applied:

1. Higher number of points obtained in the matches played among the teams in question;
2. Superior goal difference in matches played among the teams in question;
3. Higher number of goals scored in the matches played among the teams in question;
4. Higher number of goals scored away from home in the matches played among the teams in question;
5. If, after having applied criteria 1 to 4, teams still had an equal ranking, criteria 1 to 4 were reapplied exclusively to the matches between the teams in question to determine their final rankings. (Note: When there were two or more teams tied in points, criteria 1 to 4 were applied. After these criteria were applied, they could define the position of some of the teams involved, but not all of them. For example, if there was a three-way tie on points, the application of the first four criteria could only break the tie for one of the teams, leaving the other two teams still tied. In this case, the tiebreaking procedure was resumed, from the beginning, for those teams that were still tied.) If this procedure did not lead to a decision, criteria 6 to 10 applied;
6. Superior goal difference in all group matches;
7. Higher number of goals scored in all group matches;
8. Higher number of away goals scored in all group matches;
9. Fair play conduct in all group matches (1 point for a single yellow card, 3 points for a red card as a consequence of two yellow cards, 3 points for a direct red card, 4 points for a yellow card followed by a direct red card);
10. Position in the UEFA national team coefficient ranking system;

To determine the best third-placed team, the results against the teams in sixth place were discarded. The following criteria were applied:

1. Higher number of points obtained;
2. Superior goal difference;
3. Higher number of goals scored;
4. Higher number of away goals scored;
5. Fair play conduct in all group matches;
6. Position in the UEFA national team coefficient ranking system;

For each play-off tie, the team that scored more goals on aggregate over the two legs qualified for the final tournament. If the aggregate score was level, the away goals rule was applied, i.e., the team that scored more goals away from home over the two legs advanced. If away goals were also equal, then thirty minutes of extra time was played, divided into two fifteen-minutes halves. The away goals rule was again applied after extra time, i.e., if there were goals scored during extra time and the aggregate score was still level, the visiting team advanced by virtue of more away goals scored. If no goals were scored during extra time, the tie was decided by penalty shoot-out.

== Schedule ==
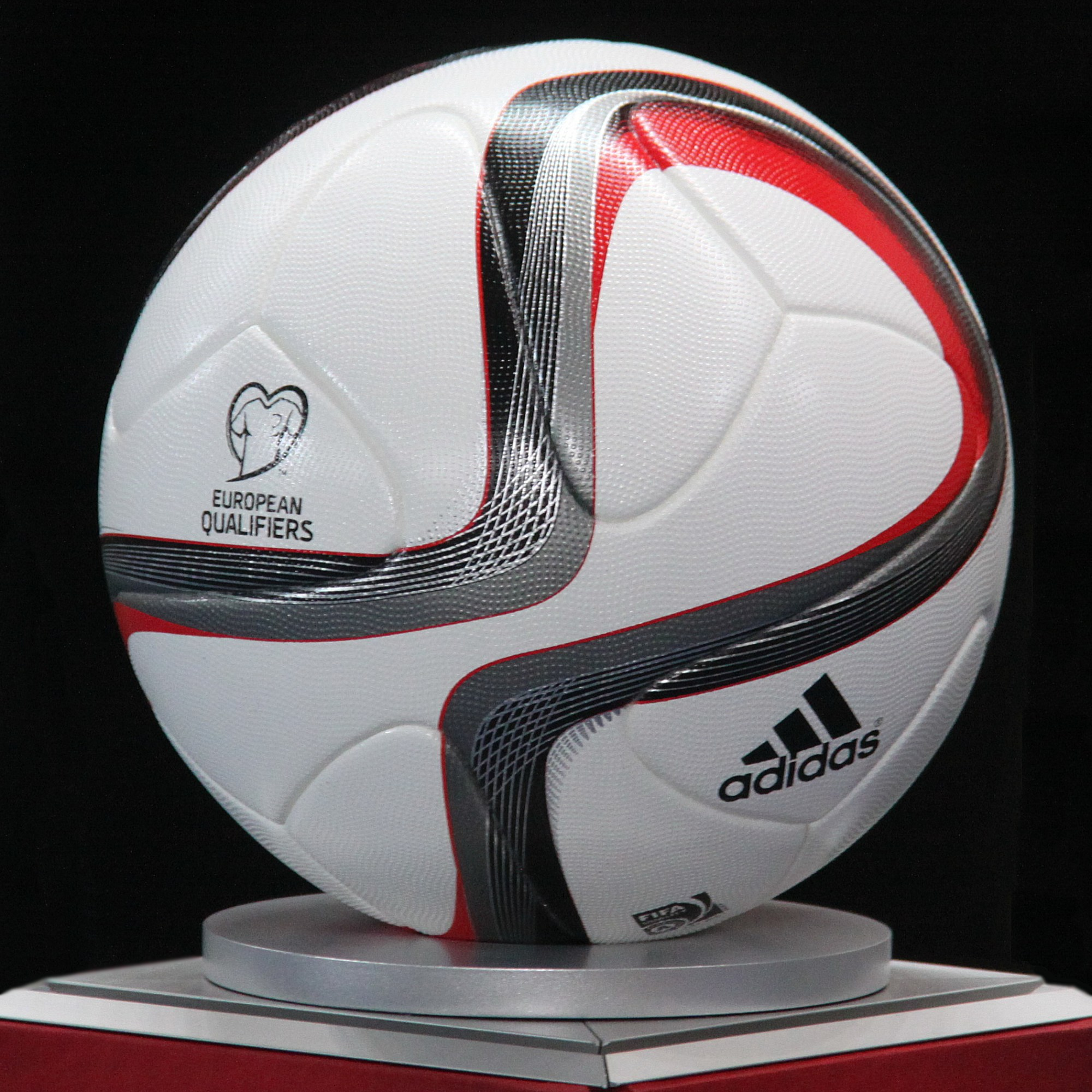
Official match ball of the UEFA Euro qualifiers

This was the first qualifying tournament after UEFA announced centralized rights deals for both UEFA Euro and FIFA World Cup qualifying. UEFA had proposed the "Week of Football" concept for the scheduling of qualifying matches as follows:

- Matches took place from Thursday to Tuesday.
- Kick-off times were largely set at 18:00 and 20:45 CET on Saturdays and Sundays, and 20:45 CET on Thursdays, Fridays, Mondays, and Tuesdays.
- On double-header match weeks, teams played on Thursday and Sunday, or Friday and Monday, or Saturday and Tuesday.
- Matches in the same group were played on the same day.

There were ten matchdays for the qualifying group stage, and two matchdays for the play-offs:

Stage	Matchday	Dates
Qualifying group stage	Matchday 1	7–9 September 2014
Qualifying group stage	Matchday 2	9–11 October 2014
Qualifying group stage	Matchday 3	12–14 October 2014
Qualifying group stage	Matchday 4	14–16 November 2014
Qualifying group stage	Matchday 5	27–29 March 2015
Qualifying group stage	Matchday 6	12–14 June 2015
Qualifying group stage	Matchday 7	3–5 September 2015
Qualifying group stage	Matchday 8	6–8 September 2015
Qualifying group stage	Matchday 9	8–10 October 2015
Qualifying group stage	Matchday 10	11–13 October 2015
Play-offs	1st leg	12–14 November 2015
Play-offs	2nd leg	15–17 November 2015

Unlike previous qualifying campaigns where group fixtures were determined by negotiation between the national federations, UEFA themselves decided each group's fixture list, released the same day as the draw.

== Draw ==
The draw took place at the Palais des Congrès Acropolis, Nice, on 23 February 2014, 12:00 CET. Groups A–H each contain one team from each of Pots 1–6, while Group I contains one team from each of Pots 1–5. For television rights reasons, England, Germany, Italy, Spain, and the Netherlands were drawn into groups of six teams. Before the draw UEFA confirmed that, for political reasons, Armenia would not be drawn against Azerbaijan (due to the dispute concerning territory of Nagorno-Karabakh) and Gibraltar would not be drawn against Spain (due to the disputed status of Gibraltar). France (Coeff: 30,992; Rank: 11), the 2016 tournament hosts, were partnered with the five-team Group I, allowing them to play friendlies against these countries on their 'spare' dates that did not count in the qualifying group standings.

=== Seeding ===
The seeding pots were announced on 24 January 2014. The teams in bold qualified to the final tournament.

Pot 1
Team	Coeff	Rank
**Spain**	42,158	1
**Germany**	41,366	2
Netherlands	38,541	3
**Italy**	35,343	4
**England**	34,885	5
**Portugal**	34,314	6
Greece	33,540	7
**Russia**	32,946	8
Bosnia and Herzegovina	31,416	9

Pot 4
Team	Coeff	Rank
Montenegro	22,991	29
Armenia	22,861	30
Scotland	22,234	31
Finland	22,001	32
Latvia	20,771	33
**Wales**	20,551	34
Bulgaria	20,391	35
Estonia	19,988	36
Belarus	19,646	37

Pot 2
Team	Coeff	Rank
**Ukraine**	31,156	10
**Croatia**	30,652	12
**Sweden**	30,111	13
Denmark	29,660	14
**Switzerland**	29,572	15
**Belgium**	28,732	16
**Czech Republic**	28,234	17
**Hungary**	27,802	18
**Republic of Ireland**	26,733	19

Pot 5
Team	Coeff	Rank
**Iceland**	19,243	38
**Northern Ireland**	19,201	39
**Albania**	19,151	40
Lithuania	19,026	41
Moldova	18,301	42
Macedonia	17,376	43
Azerbaijan	16,901	44
Georgia	16,766	45
Cyprus	14,235	46

Pot 3
Team	Coeff	Rank
Serbia	25,985	20
**Turkey**	25,955	21
Slovenia	25,834	22
Israel	25,442	23
Norway	25,341	24
**Slovakia**	25,333	25
**Romania**	25,038	26
**Austria**	24,572	27
**Poland**	23,095	28

Pot 6
Team	Coeff	Rank
Luxembourg	14,050	47
Kazakhstan	13,961	48
Liechtenstein	12,220	49
Faroe Islands	11,751	50
Malta	10,740	51
Andorra	8,560	52
San Marino	7,420	53
Gibraltar	0	54

== Summary ==
Group winners, runners-up and the best ranked third-placed team qualified directly for UEFA Euro 2016
The remaining third-placed teams advanced to the play-offs
Other teams were eliminated after the qualifying group stage

Group A	Group B	Group C	Group D	Group E	Group F	Group G	Group H	Group I
Czech Republic Iceland	Belgium Wales	Spain Slovakia	Germany Poland	England Switzerland	Northern Ireland Romania	Austria Russia	Italy Croatia	Portugal Albania
Turkey	Bosnia and Herzegovina	Ukraine	Republic of Ireland	Slovenia	Hungary	Sweden	Norway	Denmark
Netherlands Kazakhstan Latvia	Israel Cyprus Andorra	Belarus Luxembourg Macedonia	Scotland Georgia Gibraltar	Estonia Lithuania San Marino	Finland Faroe Islands Greece	Montenegro Liechtenstein Moldova	Bulgaria Azerbaijan Malta	Serbia Armenia

== Groups ==
=== Group A ===
Pos	Team	Pld	W	D	L	GF	GA	GD	Pts	Qualification	(Czech Republic)	(Iceland)	(Turkey)	(Netherlands)	(Kazakhstan)	(Latvia)
1	Czech Republic	10	7	1	2	19	14	+5	22	Qualify for final tournament	—	2–1	0–2	2–1	2–1	1–1
2	Iceland	10	6	2	2	17	6	+11	20	Qualify for final tournament	2–1	—	3–0	2–0	0–0	2–2
3	Turkey	10	5	3	2	14	9	+5	18	Qualify for final tournament	1–2	1–0	—	3–0	3–1	1–1
4	Netherlands	10	4	1	5	17	14	+3	13		2–3	0–1	1–1	—	3–1	6–0
5	Kazakhstan	10	1	2	7	7	18	−11	5 (Note: Head-to-head points: Kazakhstan 4, Latvia 1.)		2–4	0–3	0–1	1–2	—	0–0
6	Latvia	10	0	5	5	6	19	−13	5		1–2	0–3	1–1	0–2	0–1	—

Source: UEFA

=== Group B ===
Pos	Team	Pld	W	D	L	GF	GA	GD	Pts	Qualification	(Belgium)	(Wales)	(Bosnia and Herzegovina)	(Israel)	(Cyprus)	(Andorra)
1	Belgium	10	7	2	1	24	5	+19	23	Qualify for final tournament	—	0–0	3–1	3–1	5–0	6–0
2	Wales	10	6	3	1	11	4	+7	21	Qualify for final tournament	1–0	—	0–0	0–0	2–1	2–0
3	Bosnia and Herzegovina	10	5	2	3	17	12	+5	17	Advance to play-offs	1–1	2–0	—	3–1	1–2	3–0
4	Israel	10	4	1	5	16	14	+2	13		0–1	0–3	3–0	—	1–2	4–0
5	Cyprus	10	4	0	6	16	17	−1	12		0–1	0–1	2–3	1–2	—	5–0
6	Andorra	10	0	0	10	4	36	−32	0		1–4	1–2	0–3	1–4	1–3	—

Source: UEFA

=== Group C ===
Pos	Team	Pld	W	D	L	GF	GA	GD	Pts	Qualification	(Spain)	(Slovakia)	(Ukraine)	(Belarus)	(Luxembourg)	(North Macedonia)
1	Spain	10	9	0	1	23	3	+20	27	Qualify for final tournament	—	2–0	1–0	3–0	4–0	5–1
2	Slovakia	10	7	1	2	17	8	+9	22	Qualify for final tournament	2–1	—	0–0	0–1	3–0	2–1
3	Ukraine	10	6	1	3	14	4	+10	19	Advance to play-offs	0–1	0–1	—	3–1	3–0	1–0
4	Belarus	10	3	2	5	8	14	−6	11		0–1	1–3	0–2	—	2–0	0–0
5	Luxembourg	10	1	1	8	6	27	−21	4 (Note: Tied on head-to-head points (3) and head-to-head goal difference (0). Head-to-head away goals: Luxembourg 2, Macedonia 0.)		0–4	2–4	0–3	1–1	—	1–0
6	Macedonia	10	1	1	8	6	18	−12	4		0–1	0–2	0–2	1–2	3–2	—

Source: UEFA

=== Group D ===
Pos	Team	Pld	W	D	L	GF	GA	GD	Pts	Qualification	(Germany)	(Poland)	(Republic of Ireland)	(Scotland)	(Georgia (country))	(Gibraltar)
1	Germany	10	7	1	2	24	9	+15	22	Qualify for final tournament	—	3–1	1–1	2–1	2–1	4–0
2	Poland	10	6	3	1	33	10	+23	21	Qualify for final tournament	2–0	—	2–1	2–2	4–0	8–1
3	Republic of Ireland	10	5	3	2	19	7	+12	18	Advance to play-offs	1–0	1–1	—	1–1	1–0	7–0
4	Scotland	10	4	3	3	22	12	+10	15		2–3	2–2	1–0	—	1–0	6–1
5	Georgia	10	3	0	7	10	16	−6	9		0–2	0–4	1–2	1–0	—	4–0
6	Gibraltar	10	0	0	10	2	56	−54	0		0–7	0–7	0–4	0–6	0–3	—

Source: UEFA

=== Group E ===
Pos	Team	Pld	W	D	L	GF	GA	GD	Pts	Qualification	(England)	(Switzerland)	(Slovenia)	(Estonia)	(Lithuania)	(San Marino)
1	England	10	10	0	0	31	3	+28	30	Qualify for final tournament	—	2–0	3–1	2–0	4–0	5–0
2	Switzerland	10	7	0	3	24	8	+16	21	Qualify for final tournament	0–2	—	3–2	3–0	4–0	7–0
3	Slovenia	10	5	1	4	18	11	+7	16	Advance to play-offs	2–3	1–0	—	1–0	1–1	6–0
4	Estonia	10	3	1	6	4	9	−5	10 (Note: Tied on head-to-head results. Overall goal difference was used as the tiebreaker.)		0–1	0–1	1–0	—	1–0	2–0
5	Lithuania	10	3	1	6	7	18	−11	10		0–3	1–2	0–2	1–0	—	2–1
6	San Marino	10	0	1	9	1	36	−35	1		0–6	0–4	0–2	0–0	0–2	—

Source: UEFA

=== Group F ===
Pos	Team	Pld	W	D	L	GF	GA	GD	Pts	Qualification	(Northern Ireland)	(Romania)	(Hungary)	(Finland)	(Faroe Islands)	(Greece)
1	Northern Ireland	10	6	3	1	16	8	+8	21	Qualify for final tournament	—	0–0	1–1	2–1	2–0	3–1
2	Romania	10	5	5	0	11	2	+9	20	Qualify for final tournament	2–0	—	1–1	1–1	1–0	0–0
3	Hungary	10	4	4	2	11	9	+2	16	Advance to play-offs	1–2	0–0	—	1–0	2–1	0–0
4	Finland	10	3	3	4	9	10	−1	12		1–1	0–2	0–1	—	1–0	1–1
5	Faroe Islands	10	2	0	8	6	17	−11	6 (Note: Head-to-head points: Faroe Islands 6, Greece 0.)		1–3	0–3	0–1	1–3	—	2–1
6	Greece	10	1	3	6	7	14	−7	6		0–2	0–1	4–3	0–1	0–1	—

Source: UEFA

=== Group G ===
Pos	Team	Pld	W	D	L	GF	GA	GD	Pts	Qualification	(Austria)	(Russia)	(Sweden)	(Montenegro)	(Liechtenstein)	(Moldova)
1	Austria	10	9	1	0	22	5	+17	28	Qualify for final tournament	—	1–0	1–1	1–0	3–0	1–0
2	Russia	10	6	2	2	21	5	+16	20	Qualify for final tournament	0–1	—	1–0	2–0	4–0	1–1
3	Sweden	10	5	3	2	15	9	+6	18	Advance to play-offs	1–4	1–1	—	3–1	2–0	2–0
4	Montenegro	10	3	2	5	10	13	−3	11		2–3	0–3 (Note: The Montenegro v Russia match was awarded as a 3–0 win to Russia after being abandoned at 0–0 due to crowd violence and a scuffle between players.)	1–1	—	2–0	2–0
5	Liechtenstein	10	1	2	7	2	26	−24	5		0–5	0–7	0–2	0–0	—	1–1
6	Moldova	10	0	2	8	4	16	−12	2		1–2	1–2	0–2	0–2	0–1	—

Source: UEFA

=== Group H ===
Pos	Team	Pld	W	D	L	GF	GA	GD	Pts	Qualification	(Italy)	(Croatia)	(Norway)	(Bulgaria)	(Azerbaijan)	(Malta)
1	Italy	10	7	3	0	16	7	+9	24	Qualify for final tournament	—	1–1	2–1	1–0	2–1	1–0
2	Croatia (Note: Croatia were deducted one point after charges for racist behaviour in the home match against Italy.)	10	6	3	1	20	5	+15	20	Qualify for final tournament	1–1	—	5–1	3–0	6–0	2–0
3	Norway	10	6	1	3	13	10	+3	19	Advance to play-offs	0–2	2–0	—	2–1	0–0	2–0
4	Bulgaria	10	3	2	5	9	12	−3	11		2–2	0–1	0–1	—	2–0	1–1
5	Azerbaijan	10	1	3	6	7	18	−11	6		1–3	0–0	0–1	1–2	—	2–0
6	Malta	10	0	2	8	3	16	−13	2		0–1	0–1	0–3	0–1	2–2	—

Source: UEFA

=== Group I ===
Pos	Team	Pld	W	D	L	GF	GA	GD	Pts	Qualification	(Portugal)	(Albania)	(Denmark)	(Serbia)	(Armenia)
1	Portugal	8	7	0	1	11	5	+6	21	Qualify for final tournament	—	0–1	1–0	2–1	1–0
2	Albania	8	4	2	2	10	5	+5	14	Qualify for final tournament	0–1	—	1–1	0–2	2–1
3	Denmark	8	3	3	2	8	5	+3	12	Advance to play-offs	0–1	0–0	—	2–0	2–1
4	Serbia (Note: The Serbia v Albania match was awarded as a 3–0 win to Albania, and Serbia were also deducted three points, after the match was abandoned at 0–0 because home fans invaded the pitch and attacked Albania players when a drone carried a pro-Albanian flag over the stadium.)	8	2	1	5	8	13	−5	4		1–2	0–3	1–3	—	2–0
5	Armenia	8	0	2	6	5	14	−9	2		2–3	0–3	0–0	1–1	—

Source: UEFA

=== Ranking of third-placed teams ===
The highest ranked third-placed team from the groups directly qualified for the tournament, while the remainder entered the play-offs. As Group I contained five teams and the rest contained six, matches against any sixth-placed team in each group were not included in this ranking. As a result, a total of eight matches played by each team count toward the purpose of the third-placed ranking table.

Turkey became the best third-placed team, after winning against Iceland in its last match, while at the same time Kazakhstan beat Latvia to finish fifth in Group A.

Pos	Grp	Team	Pld	W	D	L	GF	GA	GD	Pts	Qualification
1	A	Turkey	8	5	1	2	12	7	+5	16	Qualify for final tournament
2	F	Hungary	8	4	3	1	8	5	+3	15	Advance to play-offs
3	C	Ukraine	8	4	1	3	11	4	+7	13	Advance to play-offs
4	H	Norway	8	4	1	3	8	10	−2	13	Advance to play-offs
5	I	Denmark	8	3	3	2	8	5	+3	12	Advance to play-offs
6	G	Sweden	8	3	3	2	11	9	+2	12	Advance to play-offs
7	D	Republic of Ireland	8	3	3	2	8	7	+1	12	Advance to play-offs
8	B	Bosnia and Herzegovina	8	3	2	3	11	12	−1	11	Advance to play-offs
9	E	Slovenia	8	3	1	4	10	11	−1	10	Advance to play-offs

Source: UEFA
Rules for classification: Counting only matches against teams ranked first to fifth in the group, 1) Points; 2) Goal difference; 3) Goals scored; 4) Away goals scored; 5) Lower disciplinary points total; 6) UEFA national team coefficient ranking; 7) Drawing of lots.

== Play-offs ==
The eight remaining third-placed teams contested two-legged play-offs to determine the last four qualifiers for the finals. The teams were seeded for the play-off draw according to the UEFA national team coefficient rankings updated after the completion of the qualifying group stage. The draw for the play-offs was held on 18 October 2015, 11:20 CEST, at the UEFA headquarters in Nyon.

=== Seedings ===
The seedings were as follows:

Pot 1 (seeded)
Team	Coeff	Rank
Bosnia and Herzegovina	30,367	13
Ukraine	30,313	14
Sweden	29,028	16
Hungary	27,142	20

Pot 2 (unseeded)
Team	Coeff	Rank
Denmark	27,140	21
Republic of Ireland	26,902	23
Norway	26,439	25
Slovenia	25,441	26

=== Matches ===
The first legs were played on 12–14 November, and the second legs were played on 15–17 November 2015. The four play-off winners (Ukraine, Sweden, Republic of Ireland and Hungary) qualified for the final tournament.

Team 1	Agg.	Team 2	1st leg	2nd leg
Ukraine	3–1	Slovenia	2–0	1–1
Sweden	4–3	Denmark	2–1	2–2
Bosnia and Herzegovina	1–3	Republic of Ireland	1–1	0–2
Norway	1–3	Hungary	0–1	1–2

== Goalscorers ==
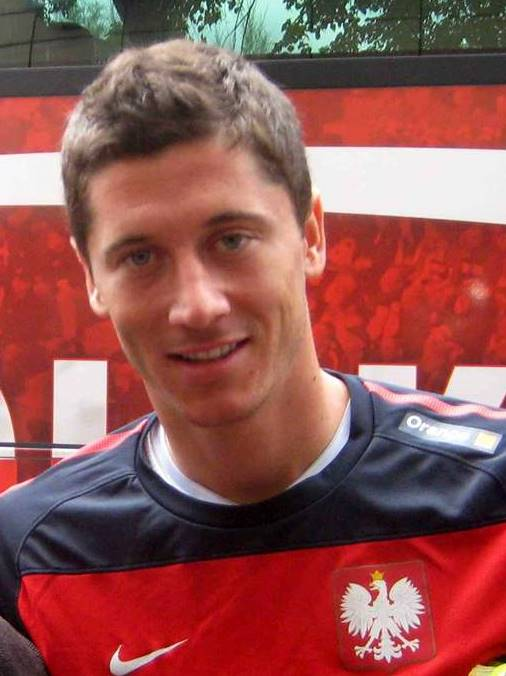
Poland's Robert Lewandowski scored 13 goals in UEFA Euro 2016 qualifying round, equalling David Healy's record in 2008 for most goals in a qualifying campaign.

There were 694 goals scored in 268 matches, for an average of 2.59 goals per match.

13 goals

- (Poland national football team) Robert Lewandowski

11 goals

- (Sweden men's national football team) Zlatan Ibrahimović

9 goals

- (Germany national football team) Thomas Müller

8 goals

- (Bosnia and Herzegovina national football team) Edin Džeko
- (Russia national football team) Artem Dzyuba

7 goals

- (Austria national football team) Marc Janko
- (England national football team) Wayne Rooney
- (Northern Ireland national football team) Kyle Lafferty
- (Scotland national football team) Steven Fletcher
- (Wales national football team) Gareth Bale

6 goals

- (Croatia national football team) Ivan Perišić
- (England national football team) Danny Welbeck
- (Iceland national football team) Gylfi Sigurðsson
- (Poland national football team) Arkadiusz Milik
- (Slovenia national football team) Milivoje Novaković
- (Ukraine national football team) Andriy Yarmolenko

5 goals

- (Belgium national football team) Kevin De Bruyne
- (Belgium national football team) Eden Hazard
- (Israel national football team) Omer Damari
- (Netherlands national football team) Klaas-Jan Huntelaar
- (Portugal national football team) Cristiano Ronaldo
- (Republic of Ireland national football team) Robbie Keane
- (Republic of Ireland national football team) Jonathan Walters
- (Scotland national football team) Shaun Maloney
- (Slovakia national football team) Marek Hamšík
- (Spain national football team) Paco Alcácer

4 goals

- (Austria national football team) David Alaba
- (Belgium national football team) Marouane Fellaini
- (Cyprus national football team) Nestoras Mitidis
- (Czech Republic national football team) Bořek Dočkal
- (Poland national football team) Kamil Grosicki
- (Switzerland national football team) Xherdan Shaqiri
- (Turkey national football team) Burak Yılmaz

3 goals

- (Andorra national football team) Ildefons Lima
- (Austria national football team) Marko Arnautović
- (Austria national football team) Martin Harnik
- (Azerbaijan national football team) Dimitrij Nazarov
- (Belgium national football team) Dries Mertens
- (Cyprus national football team) Demetris Christofi
- (Cyprus national football team) Georgios Efrem
- (England national football team) Harry Kane
- (England national football team) Theo Walcott
- (Finland national football team) Joel Pohjanpalo
- (Georgia national football team) Tornike Okriashvili
- (Germany national football team) Mario Götze
- (Germany national football team) Max Kruse
- (Germany national football team) André Schürrle
- (Iceland national football team) Kolbeinn Sigþórsson
- (Israel national football team) Tomer Hemed
- (Italy national football team) Graziano Pellè
- (Kazakhstan national football team) Yuriy Logvinenko
- (Latvia national football team) Valērijs Šabala
- (Netherlands national football team) Robin van Persie
- (Northern Ireland national football team) Gareth McAuley
- (Norway national football team) Alexander Tettey
- (Republic of Ireland national football team) Shane Long
- (Russia national football team) Aleksandr Kokorin
- (Scotland national football team) Steven Naismith
- (Serbia national football team) Zoran Tošić
- (Slovakia national football team) Adam Nemec
- (Slovenia national football team) Boštjan Cesar
- (Spain national football team) David Silva
- (Sweden men's national football team) Erkan Zengin
- (Switzerland national football team) Josip Drmić
- (Switzerland national football team) Haris Seferović
- (Turkey national football team) Selçuk İnan
- (Ukraine national football team) Artem Kravets

2 goals

- (Austria national football team) Zlatko Junuzović
- (Austria national football team) Rubin Okotie
- (Azerbaijan national football team) Rahid Amirguliyev
- (Belarus national football team) Stanislaw Drahun
- (Belarus national football team) Mikhail Gordeichuk
- (Belarus national football team) Timofei Kalachev
- (Belarus national football team) Sergei Kornilenko
- (Belgium national football team) Radja Nainggolan
- (Bosnia and Herzegovina national football team) Milan Đurić
- (Bosnia and Herzegovina national football team) Vedad Ibišević
- (Bosnia and Herzegovina national football team) Haris Medunjanin
- (Bosnia and Herzegovina national football team) Edin Višća
- (Bulgaria national football team) Iliyan Mitsanski
- (Bulgaria national football team) Ivelin Popov
- (Croatia national football team) Marcelo Brozović
- (Croatia national football team) Andrej Kramarić
- (Croatia national football team) Luka Modrić
- (Czech Republic national football team) Pavel Kadeřábek
- (Czech Republic national football team) Václav Pilař
- (Czech Republic national football team) Milan Škoda
- (Denmark national football team) Nicklas Bendtner
- (Denmark national football team) Yussuf Poulsen
- (England national football team) Ross Barkley
- (England national football team) Raheem Sterling
- (England national football team) Jack Wilshere
- (Estonia national football team) Sergei Zenjov
- (Faroe Islands national football team) Jóan Símun Edmundsson
- (Finland national football team) Riku Riski
- (Georgia national football team) Jaba Kankava
- (Georgia national football team) Valeri Qazaishvili
- (Georgia national football team) Mate Vatsadze
- (Germany national football team) İlkay Gündoğan
- (Hungary national football team) Dániel Böde
- (Hungary national football team) Krisztián Németh
- (Hungary national football team) Tamás Priskin
- (Iceland national football team) Birkir Bjarnason
- (Iceland national football team) Aron Gunnarsson
- (Israel national football team) Tal Ben Haim II
- (Israel national football team) Nir Bitton
- (Israel national football team) Eran Zahavi
- (Italy national football team) Antonio Candreva
- (Italy national football team) Giorgio Chiellini
- (Italy national football team) Éder
- (Kazakhstan national football team) Islambek Kuat
- (Lithuania national football team) Fedor Černych
- (Lithuania national football team) Arvydas Novikovas
- (Luxembourg national football team) Lars Krogh Gerson
- (North Macedonia national football team) Aleksandar Trajkovski
- (Montenegro national football team) Fatos Bećiraj
- (Montenegro national football team) Stevan Jovetić
- (Montenegro national football team) Mirko Vučinić
- (Netherlands national football team) Arjen Robben
- (Netherlands national football team) Georginio Wijnaldum
- (Northern Ireland national football team) Steven Davis
- (Norway national football team) Joshua King
- (Poland national football team) Grzegorz Krychowiak
- (Poland national football team) Sebastian Mila
- (Portugal national football team) João Moutinho
- (Republic of Ireland national football team) James McClean
- (Republic of Ireland national football team) Aiden McGeady
- (Romania national football team) Constantin Budescu
- (Romania national football team) Paul Papp
- (Romania national football team) Bogdan Stancu
- (Serbia national football team) Adem Ljajić
- (Slovakia national football team) Juraj Kucka
- (Slovakia national football team) Róbert Mak
- (Slovenia national football team) Nejc Pečnik
- (Spain national football team) Sergio Busquets
- (Spain national football team) Santi Cazorla
- (Spain national football team) Pedro
- (Sweden men's national football team) Marcus Berg
- (Switzerland national football team) Fabian Schär
- (Turkey national football team) Arda Turan
- (Ukraine national football team) Yevhen Konoplyanka
- (Ukraine national football team) Yevhen Seleznyov
- (Ukraine national football team) Serhiy Sydorchuk
- (Wales national football team) Aaron Ramsey

1 goal

- (Albania national football team) Bekim Balaj
- (Albania national football team) Berat Djimsiti
- (Albania national football team) Shkëlzen Gashi
- (Albania national football team) Ermir Lenjani
- (Albania national football team) Mërgim Mavraj
- (Albania national football team) Armando Sadiku
- (Armenia national football team) Robert Arzumanyan
- (Armenia national football team) Henrikh Mkhitaryan
- (Armenia national football team) Hrayr Mkoyan
- (Armenia national football team) Marcos Pizzelli
- (Austria national football team) Marcel Sabitzer
- (Azerbaijan national football team) Javid Huseynov
- (Belgium national football team) Michy Batshuayi
- (Belgium national football team) Christian Benteke
- (Belgium national football team) Nacer Chadli
- (Belgium national football team) Laurent Depoitre
- (Belgium national football team) Divock Origi
- (Bosnia and Herzegovina national football team) Ermin Bičakčić
- (Bosnia and Herzegovina national football team) Senad Lulić
- (Bulgaria national football team) Mihail Aleksandrov
- (Bulgaria national football team) Nikolay Bodurov
- (Bulgaria national football team) Andrey Galabinov
- (Bulgaria national football team) Ventsislav Hristov
- (Bulgaria national football team) Dimitar Rangelov
- (Croatia national football team) Nikola Kalinić
- (Croatia national football team) Mario Mandžukić
- (Croatia national football team) Ivica Olić
- (Croatia national football team) Danijel Pranjić
- (Croatia national football team) Ivan Rakitić
- (Croatia national football team) Gordon Schildenfeld
- (Cyprus national football team) Constantinos Charalambidis
- (Cyprus national football team) Jason Demetriou
- (Cyprus national football team) Dossa Júnior
- (Cyprus national football team) Vincent Laban
- (Cyprus national football team) Constantinos Makrides
- (Cyprus national football team) Giorgos Merkis
- (Czech Republic national football team) Vladimír Darida
- (Czech Republic national football team) Ladislav Krejčí
- (Czech Republic national football team) David Lafata
- (Czech Republic national football team) David Limberský
- (Czech Republic national football team) Tomáš Necid
- (Czech Republic national football team) Tomáš Sivok
- (Czech Republic national football team) Josef Šural
- (Denmark national football team) Pierre-Emile Højbjerg
- (Denmark national football team) Nicolai Jørgensen
- (Denmark national football team) Thomas Kahlenberg
- (Denmark national football team) Simon Kjær
- (Denmark national football team) Jakob Poulsen
- (Denmark national football team) Jannik Vestergaard
- (Denmark national football team) Lasse Vibe
- (England national football team) Phil Jagielka
- (England national football team) Alex Oxlade-Chamberlain
- (England national football team) Andros Townsend
- (Estonia national football team) Ats Purje
- (Estonia national football team) Konstantin Vassiljev
- (Faroe Islands national football team) Hallur Hansson
- (Faroe Islands national football team) Christian Holst
- (Faroe Islands national football team) Róaldur Jakobsen
- (Faroe Islands national football team) Brandur Olsen
- (Finland national football team) Paulus Arajuuri
- (Finland national football team) Roman Eremenko
- (Finland national football team) Jarkko Hurme
- (Finland national football team) Berat Sadik
- (Georgia national football team) Nikoloz Gelashvili
- (Germany national football team) Karim Bellarabi
- (Germany national football team) Toni Kroos
- (Germany national football team) Marco Reus
- (Gibraltar national football team) Lee Casciaro
- (Gibraltar national football team) Jake Gosling
- (Greece national football team) Christos Aravidis
- (Greece national football team) Nikos Karelis
- (Greece national football team) Panagiotis Kone
- (Greece national football team) Kostas Mitroglou
- (Greece national football team) Sokratis Papastathopoulos
- (Greece national football team) Kostas Stafylidis
- (Greece national football team) Panagiotis Tachtsidis
- (Hungary national football team) Balázs Dzsudzsák
- (Hungary national football team) Zoltán Gera
- (Hungary national football team) Richárd Guzmics
- (Hungary national football team) László Kleinheisler
- (Hungary national football team) Gergő Lovrencsics
- (Hungary national football team) Zoltán Stieber
- (Hungary national football team) Ádám Szalai
- (Iceland national football team) Jón Daði Böðvarsson
- (Iceland national football team) Rúrik Gíslason
- (Iceland national football team) Eiður Guðjohnsen
- (Iceland national football team) Ragnar Sigurðsson
- (Israel national football team) Moanes Dabour
- (Israel national football team) Gil Vermouth
- (Italy national football team) Leonardo Bonucci
- (Italy national football team) Matteo Darmian
- (Italy national football team) Daniele De Rossi
- (Italy national football team) Stephan El Shaarawy
- (Italy national football team) Alessandro Florenzi
- (Italy national football team) Simone Zaza
- (Kazakhstan national football team) Rinat Abdulin
- (Kazakhstan national football team) Samat Smakov
- (Latvia national football team) Aleksandrs Cauņa
- (Latvia national football team) Aleksejs Višņakovs
- (Latvia national football team) Artūrs Zjuzins
- (Liechtenstein national football team) Franz Burgmeier
- (Liechtenstein national football team) Sandro Wieser
- (Lithuania national football team) Deivydas Matulevičius
- (Lithuania national football team) Saulius Mikoliūnas
- (Lithuania national football team) Lukas Spalvis
- (Luxembourg national football team) Stefano Bensi
- (Luxembourg national football team) Mario Mutsch
- (Luxembourg national football team) Sébastien Thill
- (Luxembourg national football team) David Turpel
- (North Macedonia national football team) Besart Abdurahimi
- (North Macedonia national football team) Arijan Ademi
- (North Macedonia national football team) Agim Ibraimi
- (North Macedonia national football team) Adis Jahović
- (Malta national football team) Alfred Effiong
- (Malta national football team) Clayton Failla
- (Malta national football team) Michael Mifsud
- (Moldova national football team) Gheorghe Boghiu
- (Moldova national football team) Eugeniu Cebotaru
- (Moldova national football team) Alexandru Dedov
- (Moldova national football team) Alexandru Epureanu
- (Montenegro national football team) Dejan Damjanović
- (Montenegro national football team) Stefan Savić
- (Montenegro national football team) Žarko Tomašević
- (Netherlands national football team) Ibrahim Afellay
- (Netherlands national football team) Jeffrey Bruma
- (Netherlands national football team) Stefan de Vrij
- (Netherlands national football team) Luciano Narsingh
- (Netherlands national football team) Wesley Sneijder
- (Northern Ireland national football team) Craig Cathcart
- (Northern Ireland national football team) Josh Magennis
- (Northern Ireland national football team) Niall McGinn
- (Northern Ireland national football team) Jamie Ward
- (Norway national football team) Jo Inge Berget
- (Norway national football team) Mats Møller Dæhli
- (Norway national football team) Tarik Elyounoussi
- (Norway national football team) Vegard Forren
- (Norway national football team) Markus Henriksen
- (Norway national football team) Håvard Nielsen
- (Norway national football team) Håvard Nordtveit
- (Norway national football team) Alexander Søderlund
- (Poland national football team) Jakub Błaszczykowski
- (Poland national football team) Kamil Glik
- (Poland national football team) Bartosz Kapustka
- (Poland national football team) Krzysztof Mączyński
- (Poland national football team) Sławomir Peszko
- (Poland national football team) Łukasz Szukała
- (Portugal national football team) Ricardo Carvalho
- (Portugal national football team) Fábio Coentrão
- (Portugal national football team) Nani
- (Portugal national football team) Miguel Veloso
- (Republic of Ireland national football team) Robbie Brady
- (Republic of Ireland national football team) Cyrus Christie
- (Republic of Ireland national football team) Wes Hoolahan
- (Republic of Ireland national football team) John O'Shea
- (Romania national football team) Ovidiu Hoban
- (Romania national football team) Claudiu Keșerü
- (Romania national football team) Ciprian Marica
- (Romania national football team) Alexandru Maxim
- (Romania national football team) Raul Rusescu
- (Russia national football team) Alan Dzagoev
- (Russia national football team) Sergei Ignashevich
- (Russia national football team) Dmitri Kombarov
- (Russia national football team) Oleg Kuzmin
- (Russia national football team) Fyodor Smolov
- (San Marino national football team) Matteo Vitaioli
- (Scotland national football team) Ikechi Anya
- (Scotland national football team) Chris Martin
- (Scotland national football team) James McArthur
- (Scotland national football team) Matt Ritchie
- (Serbia national football team) Aleksandar Kolarov
- (Serbia national football team) Nemanja Matić
- (Slovakia national football team) Peter Pekarík
- (Slovakia national football team) Kornel Saláta
- (Slovakia national football team) Stanislav Šesták
- (Slovakia national football team) Miroslav Stoch
- (Slovakia national football team) Vladimír Weiss
- (Slovenia national football team) Robert Berić
- (Slovenia national football team) Valter Birsa
- (Slovenia national football team) Branko Ilić
- (Slovenia national football team) Josip Iličić
- (Slovenia national football team) Kevin Kampl
- (Slovenia national football team) Dejan Lazarević
- (Slovenia national football team) Andraž Struna
- (Spain national football team) Jordi Alba
- (Spain national football team) Juan Bernat
- (Spain national football team) Diego Costa
- (Spain national football team) Andrés Iniesta
- (Spain national football team) Isco
- (Spain national football team) Mario Gaspar
- (Spain national football team) Álvaro Morata
- (Spain national football team) Sergio Ramos
- (Sweden men's national football team) Jimmy Durmaz
- (Sweden men's national football team) Emil Forsberg
- (Sweden men's national football team) Ola Toivonen
- (Switzerland national football team) Eren Derdiyok
- (Switzerland national football team) Johan Djourou
- (Switzerland national football team) Blerim Džemaili
- (Switzerland national football team) Breel Embolo
- (Switzerland national football team) Gökhan Inler
- (Switzerland national football team) Pajtim Kasami
- (Switzerland national football team) Michael Lang
- (Switzerland national football team) Admir Mehmedi
- (Switzerland national football team) Valentin Stocker
- (Switzerland national football team) Granit Xhaka
- (Turkey national football team) Serdar Aziz
- (Turkey national football team) Umut Bulut
- (Turkey national football team) Hakan Çalhanoğlu
- (Turkey national football team) Bilal Kısa
- (Turkey national football team) Oğuzhan Özyakup
- (Ukraine national football team) Denys Harmash
- (Wales national football team) David Cotterill
- (Wales national football team) Hal Robson-Kanu

1 own goal

- (Albania national football team) Mërgim Mavraj (against Armenia)
- (Armenia national football team) Levon Hayrapetyan (against Serbia)
- (Armenia national football team) Kamo Hovhannisyan (against Albania)
- (Azerbaijan national football team) Rashad Sadygov (against Croatia)
- (Belarus national football team) Alyaksandr Martynovich (against Ukraine)
- (Bulgaria national football team) Nikolay Bodurov (against Croatia)
- (Bulgaria national football team) Yordan Minev (against Italy)
- (Croatia national football team) Vedran Ćorluka (against Norway)
- (Cyprus national football team) Dossa Júnior (against Andorra)
- (England national football team) Jordan Henderson (against Slovenia)
- (Estonia national football team) Ragnar Klavan (against Switzerland)
- (Georgia national football team) Akaki Khubutia (against Scotland)
- (Germany national football team) Mats Hummels (against Scotland)
- (Gibraltar national football team) Jordan Perez (against Republic of Ireland)
- (Gibraltar national football team) Yogan Santos (against Germany)
- (Iceland national football team) Jón Daði Böðvarsson (against Czech Republic)
- (Italy national football team) Giorgio Chiellini (against Azerbaijan)
- (Liechtenstein national football team) Martin Büchel (against Russia)
- (Liechtenstein national football team) Franz Burgmeier (against Russia)
- (North Macedonia national football team) Tome Pachovski (against Spain)
- (Moldova national football team) Petru Racu (against Montenegro)
- (Netherlands national football team) Robin van Persie (against Czech Republic)
- (Norway national football team) Markus Henriksen (against Hungary)
- (Republic of Ireland national football team) John O'Shea (against Scotland)
- (San Marino national football team) Cristian Brolli (against England)
- (San Marino national football team) Alessandro Della Valle (against England)

2 own goals

- (Lithuania national football team) Giedrius Arlauskis (against England & Switzerland)

== Branding ==
UEFA unveiled the branding for the qualifiers on 15 April 2013. It shows a national jersey inside a heart, and represents Europe, honour and ambition. The same branding was also used for the European qualifiers for the 2018 World Cup.
