= UEFA Euro 2016 qualifying Group C =

Football tournament qualification stage

The UEFA Euro 2016 qualifying Group C was one of the nine groups to decide which teams would qualify for the UEFA Euro 2016 finals tournament. Group C consisted of six teams: Spain, Ukraine, Slovakia, Belarus, Macedonia, and Luxembourg, where they played against each other home-and-away in a round-robin format.

Originally Gibraltar had been drawn in this group, but were moved to group D due to Spain not being willing to play them because of the disputed status of Gibraltar.

The top two teams, Spain and Slovakia, qualified directly for the finals. As third-placed Ukraine weren't the highest-ranked among all third-placed teams, they advanced to the play-offs, where they won against Slovenia and thus qualified as well.

== Standings ==
Pos	Team	Pld	W	D	L	GF	GA	GD	Pts	Qualification	(Spain)	(Slovakia)	(Ukraine)	(Belarus)	(Luxembourg)	(North Macedonia)
1	Spain	10	9	0	1	23	3	+20	27	Qualify for final tournament	—	2–0	1–0	3–0	4–0	5–1
2	Slovakia	10	7	1	2	17	8	+9	22	Qualify for final tournament	2–1	—	0–0	0–1	3–0	2–1
3	Ukraine	10	6	1	3	14	4	+10	19	Advance to play-offs	0–1	0–1	—	3–1	3–0	1–0
4	Belarus	10	3	2	5	8	14	−6	11		0–1	1–3	0–2	—	2–0	0–0
5	Luxembourg	10	1	1	8	6	27	−21	4 (Note: Tied on head-to-head points (3) and head-to-head goal difference (0). Head-to-head away goals: Luxembourg 2, Macedonia 0.)		0–4	2–4	0–3	1–1	—	1–0
6	Macedonia	10	1	1	8	6	18	−12	4		0–1	0–2	0–2	1–2	3–2	—

Source: UEFA
Rules for classification: Qualification tiebreakers

== Matches ==
The fixtures were released by UEFA the same day as the draw, which was held on 23 February 2014 in Nice. Times are CET/CEST, (Note: CET (UTC+1) for matches on 15 November 2014 and 27 March 2015, and CEST (UTC+2) for all other matches.) as listed by UEFA (local times are in parentheses).

8 September 2014
20:45
(20:45 UTC+2)

Luxembourg	1–1	Belarus
Gerson 42'	Report	Drahun 78'

Stade Josy Barthel, Luxembourg City
Attendance: 3,265
Referee: Gediminas Mažeika (Lithuania)
8 September 2014
20:45
(20:45 UTC+2)

Spain	5–1	Macedonia
Ramos 16' (pen.); Alcácer 17'; Busquets 45+3'; Silva 50'; Pedro 90+1'	Report	Ibraimi 28' (pen.)

Ciutat de València, Valencia
Attendance: 18,553
Referee: Anastasios Sidiropoulos (Greece)
8 September 2014
20:45
(21:45 UTC+3)

Ukraine	0–1	Slovakia
	Report	Mak 17'

Olympic Stadium, Kyiv
Attendance: 38,454
Referee: Craig Thomson (Scotland)

9 October 2014
20:45
(21:45 UTC+3)

Belarus	0–2	Ukraine
	Report	Martynovich 82' (o.g.); Sydorchuk 90+3'

Borisov Arena, Barysaw
Attendance: 10,512
Referee: Pol van Boekel (Netherlands)
9 October 2014
20:45
(20:45 UTC+2)

Macedonia	3–2	Luxembourg
Trajkovski 20'; Jahović 66' (pen.); Abdurahimi 90+2'	Report	Bensi 39'; Turpel 44'

Philip II Arena, Skopje
Attendance: 11,500
Referee: Paolo Mazzoleni (Italy)
9 October 2014
20:45
(20:45 UTC+2)

Slovakia	2–1	Spain
Kucka 17'; Stoch 87'	Report	Alcácer 82'

Štadión pod Dubňom, Žilina
Attendance: 9,478
Referee: Björn Kuipers (Netherlands)

12 October 2014
18:00
(19:00 UTC+3)

Ukraine	1–0	Macedonia
Sydorchuk 45+2'	Report

Arena Lviv, Lviv
Attendance: 33,978
Referee: Sébastien Delferière (Belgium)
12 October 2014
20:45
(21:45 UTC+3)

Belarus	1–3	Slovakia
Kalachev 79'	Report	Hamšík 65', 84'; Šesták 90+1'

Borisov Arena, Barysaw
Attendance: 3,684
Referee: Serge Gumienny (Belgium)
12 October 2014
20:45
(20:45 UTC+2)

Luxembourg	0–4	Spain
	Report	Silva 27'; Alcácer 42'; Costa 69'; Bernat 88'

Stade Josy Barthel, Luxembourg City
Attendance: 8,125
Referee: Paweł Gil (Poland)

15 November 2014
18:00
(18:00 UTC+1)

Luxembourg	0–3	Ukraine
	Report	Yarmolenko 33', 53', 56'

Stade Josy Barthel, Luxembourg City
Attendance: 4,379
Referee: Kristinn Jakobsson (Iceland)
15 November 2014
20:45
(20:45 UTC+1)

Macedonia	0–2	Slovakia
	Report	Kucka 25'; Nemec 38'

Philip II Arena, Skopje
Attendance: 11,322
Referee: Pedro Proença (Portugal)
15 November 2014
20:45
(20:45 UTC+1)

Spain	3–0	Belarus
Isco 18'; Busquets 19'; Pedro 55'	Report

Nuevo Colombino, Huelva
Attendance: 19,249
Referee: Kenn Hansen (Denmark)

27 March 2015
20:45
(20:45 UTC+1)

Macedonia	1–2	Belarus
Trajkovski 9'	Report	Kalachev 44'; Kornilenko 82'

Philip II Arena, Skopje
Attendance: 3,447
Referee: Anthony Taylor (England)
27 March 2015
20:45
(20:45 UTC+1)

Slovakia	3–0	Luxembourg
Nemec 10'; Weiss 21'; Pekarík 40'	Report

Štadión pod Dubňom, Žilina
Attendance: 9,524
Referee: Stephan Studer (Switzerland)
27 March 2015
20:45
(20:45 UTC+1)

Spain	1–0	Ukraine
Morata 28'	Report

Ramón Sánchez-Pizjuán, Seville
Attendance: 33,775
Referee: Cüneyt Çakır (Turkey)

14 June 2015
18:00
(19:00 UTC+3)

Ukraine	3–0	Luxembourg
Kravets 49'; Harmash 57'; Konoplyanka 86'	Report

Arena Lviv, Lviv
Attendance: 21,635
Referee: Arnold Hunter (Northern Ireland)
14 June 2015
20:45
(21:45 UTC+3)

Belarus	0–1	Spain
	Report	Silva 45'

Borisov Arena, Barysaw
Attendance: 13,121
Referee: Robert Schörgenhofer (Austria)
14 June 2015
20:45
(20:45 UTC+2)

Slovakia	2–1	Macedonia
Saláta 8'; Hamšík 38'	Report	Ademi 69'

Štadión pod Dubňom, Žilina
Attendance: 10,765
Referee: Kenn Hansen (Denmark)

5 September 2015
18:00
(18:00 UTC+2)

Luxembourg	1–0	Macedonia
Thill 90+2'	Report

Stade Josy Barthel, Luxembourg City
Attendance: 1,657
Referee: Simon Lee Evans (Wales)
5 September 2015
18:00
(19:00 UTC+3)

Ukraine	3–1	Belarus
Kravets 7'; Yarmolenko 30'; Konoplyanka 40' (pen.)	Report	Kornilenko 62' (pen.)

Arena Lviv, Lviv
Attendance: 32,648
Referee: Liran Liany (Israel)
5 September 2015
20:45
(20:45 UTC+2)

Spain	2–0	Slovakia
Alba 5'; Iniesta 30' (pen.)	Report

Carlos Tartiere, Oviedo
Attendance: 19,874
Referee: Damir Skomina (Slovenia)

8 September 2015
20:45
(21:45 UTC+3)

Belarus	2–0	Luxembourg
Gordeichuk 34', 62'	Report

Borisov Arena, Barysaw
Attendance: 3,482
Referee: Slavko Vinčić (Slovenia)
8 September 2015
20:45
(20:45 UTC+2)

Macedonia	0–1	Spain
	Report	Pačovski 8' (o.g.)

Philip II Arena, Skopje
Attendance: 28,843
Referee: Paolo Tagliavento (Italy)
8 September 2015
20:45
(20:45 UTC+2)

Slovakia	0–0	Ukraine
	Report

Štadión pod Dubňom, Žilina
Attendance: 10,648
Referee: Martin Atkinson (England)

9 October 2015
20:45
(20:45 UTC+2)

Macedonia	0–2	Ukraine
	Report	Seleznyov 59' (pen.); Kravets 87'

Philip II Arena, Skopje
Attendance: 4,821
Referee: Ovidiu Hațegan (Romania)
9 October 2015
20:45
(20:45 UTC+2)

Slovakia	0–1	Belarus
	Report	Drahun 34'

Štadión pod Dubňom, Žilina
Attendance: 9,859
Referee: Hüseyin Göçek (Turkey)
9 October 2015
20:45
(20:45 UTC+2)

Spain	4–0	Luxembourg
Cazorla 42', 85'; Alcácer 67', 80'	Report

Las Gaunas, Logroño
Attendance: 14,472
Referee: Sébastien Delferière (Belgium)

12 October 2015
20:45
(21:45 UTC+3)

Belarus	0–0	Macedonia
	Report

Borisov Arena, Barysaw
Attendance: 1,545
Referee: Christian Dingert (Germany)
12 October 2015
20:45
(20:45 UTC+2)

Luxembourg	2–4	Slovakia
Mutsch 61'; Gerson 65' (pen.)	Report	Hamšík 24', 90+1'; Nemec 29'; Mak 30'

Stade Josy Barthel, Luxembourg City
Attendance: 2,512
Referee: Oliver Drachta (Austria)
12 October 2015
20:45
(21:45 UTC+3)

Ukraine	0–1	Spain
	Report	Mario 22'

Olympic Stadium, Kyiv
Attendance: 61,248
Referee: Milorad Mažić (Serbia)

== Goalscorers ==
There were 74 goals scored in 30 matches, for an average of 2.47 goals per match.

5 goals

- (Slovakia national football team) Marek Hamšík
- (Spain national football team) Paco Alcácer

4 goals

- (Ukraine national football team) Andriy Yarmolenko

3 goals

- (Slovakia national football team) Adam Nemec
- (Spain national football team) David Silva
- (Ukraine national football team) Artem Kravets

2 goals

- (Belarus national football team) Stanislaw Drahun
- (Belarus national football team) Mikhail Gordeichuk
- (Belarus national football team) Timofei Kalachev
- (Belarus national football team) Sergei Kornilenko
- (Luxembourg national football team) Lars Krogh Gerson
- (North Macedonia national football team) Aleksandar Trajkovski
- (Slovakia national football team) Juraj Kucka
- (Slovakia national football team) Róbert Mak
- (Spain national football team) Sergio Busquets
- (Spain national football team) Santi Cazorla
- (Spain national football team) Pedro
- (Ukraine national football team) Yevhen Konoplyanka
- (Ukraine national football team) Serhiy Sydorchuk

1 goal

- (Luxembourg national football team) Stefano Bensi
- (Luxembourg national football team) Mario Mutsch
- (Luxembourg national football team) Sébastien Thill
- (Luxembourg national football team) David Turpel
- (North Macedonia national football team) Besart Abdurahimi
- (North Macedonia national football team) Arijan Ademi
- (North Macedonia national football team) Agim Ibraimi
- (North Macedonia national football team) Adis Jahović
- (Slovakia national football team) Peter Pekarík
- (Slovakia national football team) Kornel Saláta
- (Slovakia national football team) Stanislav Šesták
- (Slovakia national football team) Miroslav Stoch
- (Slovakia national football team) Vladimír Weiss
- (Spain national football team) Jordi Alba
- (Spain national football team) Juan Bernat
- (Spain national football team) Diego Costa
- (Spain national football team) Andrés Iniesta
- (Spain national football team) Isco
- (Spain national football team) Mario Gaspar
- (Spain national football team) Álvaro Morata
- (Spain national football team) Sergio Ramos
- (Ukraine national football team) Denys Harmash
- (Ukraine national football team) Yevhen Seleznyov

1 own goal

- (Belarus national football team) Alyaksandr Martynovich (against Ukraine)
- (North Macedonia national football team) Tome Pachovski (against Spain)

== Discipline ==
A player was automatically suspended for the next match for the following offences:

- Receiving a red card (red card suspensions could be extended for serious offences)
- Receiving three yellow cards in three different matches, as well as after fifth and any subsequent yellow card (yellow card suspensions were carried forward to the play-offs, but not the finals or any other future international matches)

The following suspensions were served during the qualifying matches:

Team	Player	Offence(s)	Suspended for match(es)
Belarus	Maksim Bardachow	(yellow card) vs Spain (15 November 2014); (yellow card) vs Macedonia (27 March 2015); (yellow card) vs Spain (14 June 2015)	vs Ukraine (5 September 2015)
Belarus	Alyaksandr Martynovich	(yellow card) vs Luxembourg (8 September 2014); (yellow card) vs Macedonia (27 March 2015); (yellow card) vs Ukraine (5 September 2015)	vs Luxembourg (8 September 2015)
Belarus	Alyaksandr Martynovich	(yellow card) (yellow-red card) vs Slovakia (9 October 2015)	vs Macedonia (12 October 2015)
Luxembourg	Aurélien Joachim	(red card) vs Portugal (15 October 2013) (Note: The suspension was carried over from the 2014 FIFA World Cup qualification.)	vs Belarus (8 September 2014)
Luxembourg	Mario Mutsch	(yellow card) vs Macedonia (9 October 2014); (yellow card) vs Slovakia (27 March 2015); (yellow card) vs Ukraine (14 June 2015)	vs Macedonia (5 September 2015)
Luxembourg	Christopher Martins	(yellow card) vs Belarus (8 September 2014); (yellow card) vs Ukraine (15 November 2014); (yellow card) vs Macedonia (5 September 2015)	vs Belarus (8 September 2015)
Luxembourg	Chris Philipps	(yellow card) vs Belarus (8 September 2014); (yellow card) vs Macedonia (9 October 2014); (yellow card) vs Belarus (8 September 2015)	vs Spain (9 October 2015)
Luxembourg	Daniel da Mota	(yellow card) vs Belarus (8 September 2014); (yellow card) vs Ukraine (14 June 2015); (yellow card) vs Spain (9 October 2015)	vs Slovakia (12 October 2015)
Macedonia	Ferhan Hasani	(yellow card) (yellow-red card) vs Slovakia (14 June 2014)	vs Luxembourg (5 September 2015)
Macedonia	Besart Abdurahimi	(yellow card) vs Spain (8 September 2014); (yellow card) vs Ukraine (12 October 2014); (yellow card) vs Luxembourg (5 September 2015)	vs Spain (8 September 2015)
Macedonia	Stefan Ristovski	(yellow card) vs Spain (8 September 2014); (yellow card) vs Luxembourg (9 October 2014); (yellow card) vs Luxembourg (5 September 2015)	vs Spain (8 September 2015)
Slovakia	Martin Škrtel	(red card) vs Greece (11 October 2013)	vs Ukraine (8 September 2014)
Slovakia	Martin Škrtel	(yellow card) vs Macedonia (15 November 2014); (yellow card) vs Luxembourg (27 March 2015); (yellow card) vs Macedonia (14 June 2015)	vs Spain (5 September 2015)
Slovakia	Juraj Kucka	(yellow card) vs Ukraine (8 September 2014); (yellow card) vs Spain (9 October 2015); (yellow card) vs Macedonia (14 June 2015)	vs Spain (5 September 2015)
Slovakia	Norbert Gyömbér	(yellow card) vs Spain (9 October 2014); (yellow card) vs Belarus (12 October 2014); (yellow card) vs Ukraine (8 September 2015)	vs Belarus (9 October 2015)
Spain	Diego Costa	(yellow card) vs Slovakia (9 October 2014); (yellow card) vs Luxembourg (12 October 2014); (yellow card) vs Macedonia (8 September 2015)	vs Luxembourg (9 October 2015)
Ukraine	Yevhen Khacheridi	(yellow card) (yellow-red card) vs France (19 November 2013)	vs Slovakia (8 September 2014)
Ukraine	Yevhen Khacheridi	(yellow card) vs Luxembourg (15 November 2014); (yellow card) vs Belarus (5 September 2015); (yellow card) vs Macedonia (9 October 2015)	vs Spain (12 October 2015)
Ukraine	Artem Fedetskyi	(yellow card) vs Slovakia (8 September 2014); (yellow card) vs Macedonia (12 October 2014); (yellow card) vs Spain (27 March 2015)	vs Luxembourg (14 June 2015)
Ukraine	Denys Harmash	(yellow card) (yellow-red card) vs Belarus (5 September 2015)	vs Slovakia (8 September 2015)
Ukraine	Serhiy Sydorchuk	(yellow card) vs Macedonia (12 October 2014); (yellow card) vs Luxembourg (15 November 2014); (yellow card) vs Macedonia (9 October 2015)	vs Spain (12 October 2015)
