= Artem Kravets =

Ukrainian footballer (born 1989)

Artem Kravets Артем Кравець
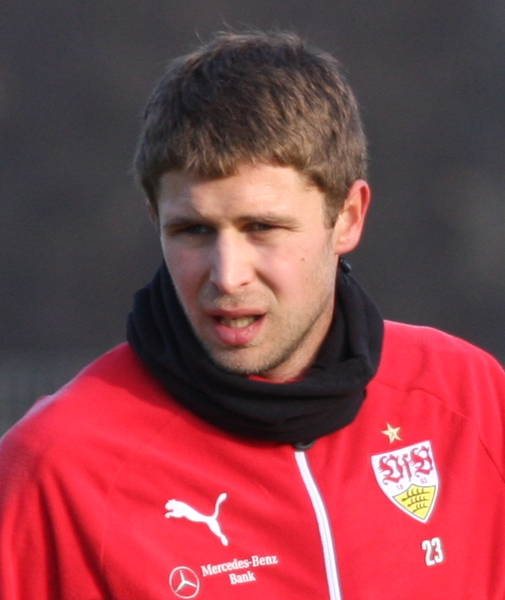

Personal information
- Full name: Artem Anatoliyovich Kravets
- Date of birth: 3 June 1989 (age 37)
- Place of birth: Dniprodzerzhynsk, Ukrainian SSR, Soviet Union
- Height: 1.89 m (6 ft 2 in)
- Position: Striker

Youth career
- 2001–2002: Nadiya-Vahonmash Dniprodzerzhynsk
- 2003: Inter Dnipropetrovsk
- 2004–2006: Dynamo Kyiv

Senior career*
| Years | Team | Apps | (Gls) |
| 2006–2017 | Dynamo Kyiv | 90 | (33) |
| 2006 | → Dynamo-3 Kyiv | 1 | (0) |
| 2006–2007 | → Dynamo-2 Kyiv | 34 | (6) |
| 2013 | → Arsenal Kyiv (loan) | 10 | (3) |
| 2016 | → VfB Stuttgart (loan) | 15 | (1) |
| 2016–2017 | → Granada (loan) | 26 | (5) |
| 2018–2020 | Kayserispor | 55 | (16) |
| 2020 | Dynamo Kyiv | 1 | (0) |
| 2020–2022 | Konyaspor | 29 | (9) |
| 2022–2023 | Sakaryaspor | 6 | (0) |
| Total | | 267 | (73) |

International career^{‡}
| 2006 | Ukraine U17 | 7 | (1) |
| 2006–2007 | Ukraine U18 | 7 | (4) |
| 2006–2008 | Ukraine U19 | 12 | (7) |
| 2008–2011 | Ukraine U21 | 9 | (0) |
| 2011–2019 | Ukraine | 23 | (8) |
- * Club domestic league appearances and goals as of 26 July 2023 ‡ National team caps and goals as of 26 July 2023

Artem Anatoliyovich Kravets (Ukrainian: Артем Анатолійович Кравець; born 3 June 1989) is a Ukrainian former professional footballer who played as a striker.

== Club career ==
=== Dynamo Kyiv ===
==== 2007–2009: early years ====
Kravets appeared for regularly for the Dynamo Reserves and Dynamo-2 Kyiv until he was noticed by Dynamo's new coach Yuriy Semin, who took him to the main team in the 2007–08 season, who recognized the player's great potential. He made his professional debut on 17 June 2007 in the last championship round against Arsenal Kyiv, replacing Balázs Farkas at half time. It was his only appearance of the season, as Dynamo Kyiv won the title for the 12th time; this also marked Kravets' first senior trophy.

On 12 December 2007, aged 18, Kravets made his UEFA Champions League by playing for 33 minutes in a 3–0 away defeat to Sporting CP in the last match of that season's group stage. Dynamo Kyiv eventually finished last in their group by losing all matches.

Kravets scored his first goal for Dynamo Kyiv senior squad on 2 March 2008 in a 4–0 home win against Dnipro Dnipropetrovsk. He found more space in his second season with the senior side, netting three goals in 11 appearances.

One of his most notable appearance was in UEFA Cup game against Valencia which ended in 2–2 draw on 27 February 2009, helping Kyiv to advance by aggregate goals. Kravets scored both goals for Dynamo on 34th and 73rd minutes. In July 2009, Kravets suffered a thigh injury and the surgery was needed. He was operated in Munich, and the recovery time was at least six weeks. His recovery was completed in late September where he finally returned in action, being named in the squad for the UEFA Champions League group stage match against Barcelona.

He concluded the 2009–10 season by netting only in 11 appearance. His last appearance of the season, on 6 March 2010 against Mariupol, was his 50th overall for Dynamo Kyiv.

==== 2010–2013: injury-hit campaigns ====
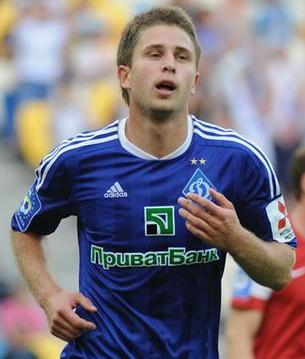
Kravets playing for Dynamo Kyiv in May 2013

Kravets was, arguably, Dynamo Kyiv's most natural finisher and many saw him as the natural successor to Andriy Shevchenko but since the 2010–11 season (whilst on the verge of breaking into the full national team), Artem had a series of serious injuries and missed most of the last three league campaigns.

Kravets made no appearances during the 2011–12 season in which Dynamo Kyiv finished runner-up to Shakhtar Donetsk in league. He still featured 12 times in bench. He was also hit by two long-term injuries which forced him to be sidelined for several months. In the autumn of 2012, the head coach Oleh Blokhin decided that Kravets will no longer train with the senior squad. Kravets then continued appearing and training with the Dynamo-2 Kyiv.

Blokhin decided to give him "one last chance" by returning him to the senior squad in January 2013. He made his competitive appearance for the senior squad in late May, where he played as starter in the last match of a season, a 3–0 win over Metalurh Zaporizhya, where Kravets scored a brace.

==== 2013–2014: loan to Arsenal Kyiv and reduced appearances ====
On 26 July 2013, Kravets was sent on loan at fellow top flight side Arsenal Kyiv until the end of the year. He debuted the next day, starting and playing 62 minutes in a 2–0 in away at Karpaty Lviv. He opened his scoring account later on 14 September, scoring in a 2–1 win over Volyn Lutsk. In October 2013, Arsenal Kyiv was expelled from the league after its general director Kyiv Viktor Holovko announced that the club was filing for bankruptcy and withdrawing from competitions as it was unable to find any sponsors. Overall, Kravets played 11 matches, including 10 in league, and scored 3 goals.

In October 2013, Kravets returned to Dynamo Kyiv after his short-term loan at Arsenal Kyiv, and was assigned to the b-squad, scoring 5 goals in 8 matches. In December, he returned to the senior squad. Kravets then made only one appearance for the team until the end of 2013–14 campaign, entering in the last 7 minutes of a 2–0 home defeat to Valencia in 2013–14 UEFA Europa League round of 32.

==== 2014–2015: breakthrough ====
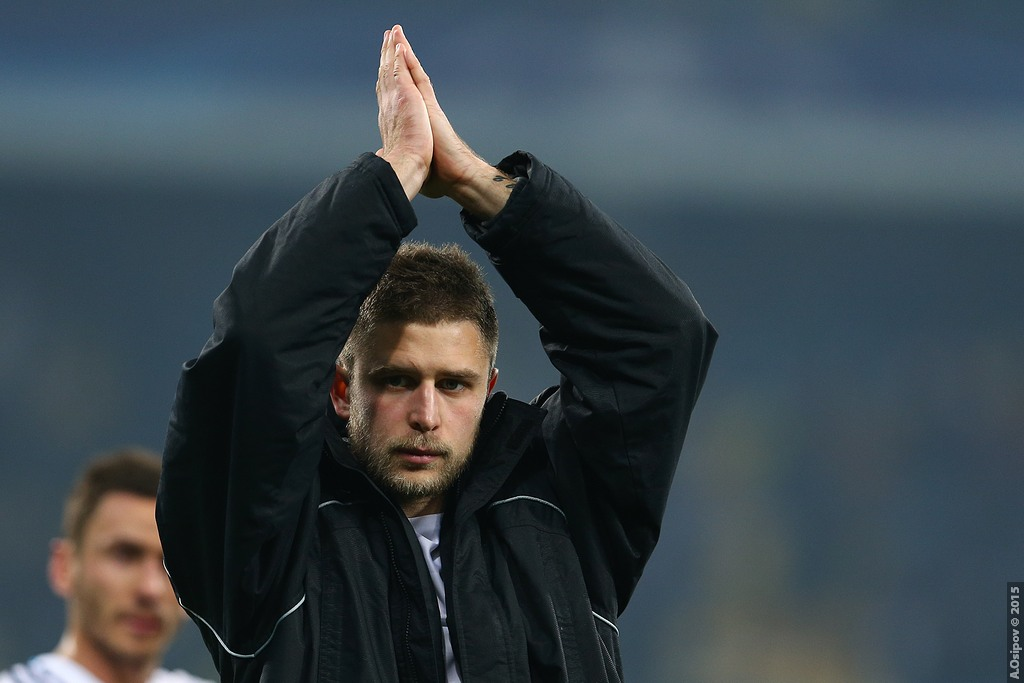
Kravets following the end of a Europa League match against Chelsea

In July 2014, Kravetes signed a new one-year contract lasting until July 2015. After a long struggle though with injury, he finally regained full fitness and started to display some of his original potential whilst forcing himself back into the Dynamo Kyiv first team for the 2014–15 season. He began the new season by being in the losing side in the Ukrainian Super Cup match against rivals FC Shakhtar Donetsk.

He started his first match after a long time on 27 July in the championship first week, a 1–0 home win over Vorskla Poltava. His first score-sheet contributions came in the second championship week against Metalist Kharkiv, with Kravets scored his team's opener in a 2–1 win at Metalist Oblast Sports Complex. It was his first senior goal for Dynamo since May 2013 and the 20th overall. On 17 August, Kravets scored his first professional hat-trick, contributing with three goals in a 4–1 win at Mariupol to help Dynamo jump to the first place.

On 13 September, Kravets made his 50th Ukrainian Premier League appearance by scoring in a 2–2 draw against Zorya Luhansk. It was the 5th of the season in the league, a new personal record for him. Five days later, Kravets started in the team's opening 2014–15 UEFA Europa League Group J match against Portugal's Rio Ave on 18 September, and scored the third goal, of the match with a left-footed shot to contribute in a 3–0 win. It was his first European goal since 2009. He was on the score-sheet also in the second matchday, a 3–1 home win over Steaua București, and played in the remaining match as Dynamo topped their group.

Kravets reached double-figures for the first time in his career on 2 November by scoring the third goal of a 3–0 win versus Dnipro Dnipropetrovsk. On 3 February 2015, his good performances were rewarded as he signed a three-and-a-half-year contract with the club. Later on 19 April, Kravets scored his 10th league goal of the season with a brace in the 3–1 win at Volyn Lutsk.

Dynamo Kyiv was named league champions after finishing the season unbeaten, with Kravets netting 15 goals in 25 appearances. In cup, he played 5 matches, including 56 minutes in the final, and scored 2 goals, as the team took a penalty shootout win over Shakhtar Donetsk to achieve the domestic double. In Europa League, they were eliminated in quarter-finals by Italian side Fiorentina 3–1 on aggregate; overall he played 10 matches and scored 2 goals. Kravets dubbed the 2014–15 season as the best of his career.

==== 2016–2017: loans to Stuttgart and Granada ====
On 4 January 2016, Kravets was loaned out to German club Stuttgart until the end of the 2015–16 season. On 30 January, in his second appearance for Stuttgart, he scored his first goal for the German Bundesliga side, the late winner in a home game against Hamburger SV.

On 30 August 2016, Kravets was loaned to La Liga side Granada, for one year. He made his debut for the club on 11 September by entering in the second half of the match against Eibar, netting the temporally equalizer in an eventual 1–2 home loss. He suffered an ankle strain during the 3–0 home loss to Celta de Vigo on 16 April 2017, which forced him to be replaced at half time, and subsequently ended his season. Kravets spent the season between bench and playing field but still managed to collected 26 La Liga appearances, scoring 5 times as well.

==== 2017–2018: final months and departure ====
He returned to Dynamo Kyiv in July 2017, and played 15 matches in all competitions and scored 5 goals. He was named Player of the Month for October 2017 after scoring once in league (2–1 loss against Chornomorets Odesa) and a brace in cup (3–2 extra time win over Oleksandriya). Kravets' final appearance for the club occurred on 2 November 2017 in a UEFA Europa League group stage match away against Young Boys; he played in the second half as a substitute for Tomasz Kędziora.

=== Kayserispor ===
Kravets left the club for good in January 2018, to join the Süper Lig side Kayserispor. He was presented on 16 January, where he inked a contract running until June 2021. Kravets made his debut for his new side eleven days later by entering as a late substitute in the 89th minute in a 1–1 draw at Göztepe. Kravets went on to make 55 league appearances for his new club over the next two and a half seasons. However, on 18 August 2020 it was announced that Kayserispor and Kravets agreed to terminate his contract a year early, making him a free agent.

=== Return to Dynamo Kyiv ===
Two days later, on 20 August 2020, it was announced that Kravets signed a two-year contract with Dynamo Kyiv, with the option of extension for another year.

=== Sakaryaspor ===
On 14 August 2022, Kravets signed a one-year contract with Sakaryaspor in the TFF First League.

== International career ==
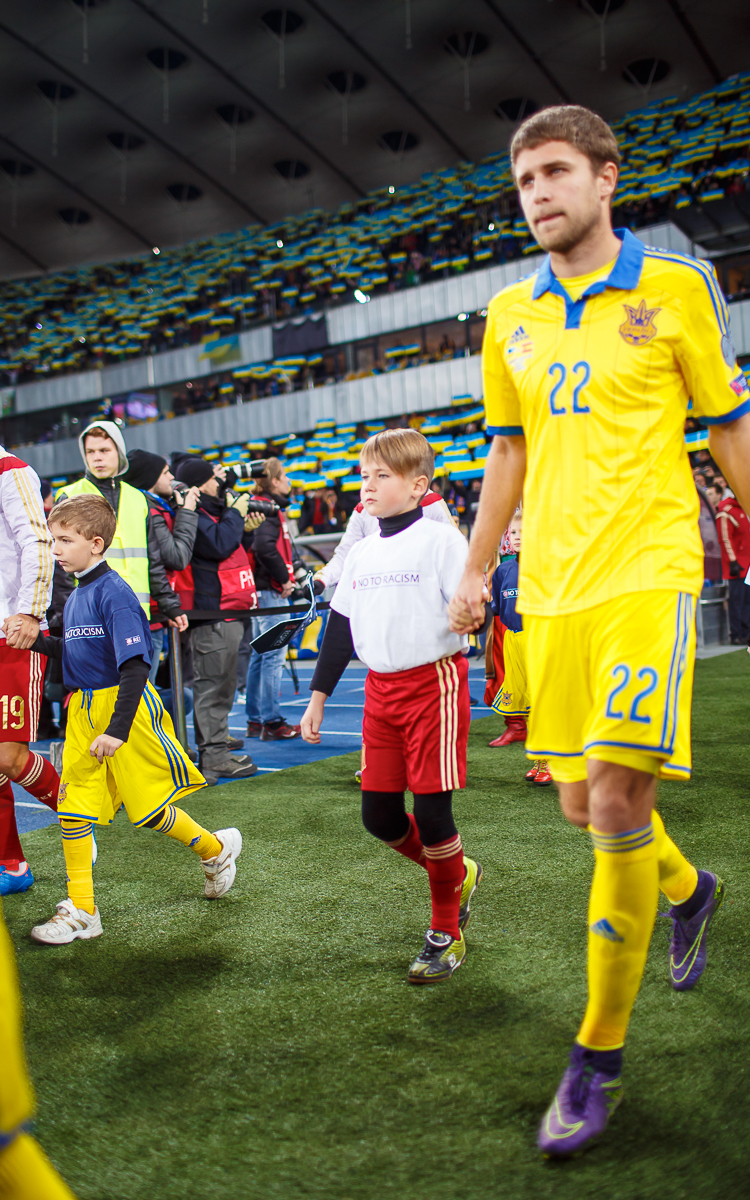
Kravets entering in the field before a match in October 2015

=== 2008–2009: prolonged debut ===
Kravets' career with Ukraine senior team began in March 2008 where he was called up for a friendly match against Serbia, but his debut was prolonged due to an injury he suffered just before the match. Kravets was later called in a 2010 FIFA World Cup qualifying match against England on 1 April 2009. However, his debut was again delayed when he suffered an injury to a muscle in his thigh, six days before the match, and was subsequently replaced by Yevhen Seleznyov.

=== 2011: first cap and UEFA European Under-21 Championship ===
In January 2011, Kravets was called up again, this time for the Cyprus International Football Tournaments, where he was able to earn his first cap, appearing in the last 20 minutes of a 2–2 draw against Romania. He started in the next match against Sweden and played entire match as the team won 5–4 on penalty shootout.

In June 2011, he played for the under-21 squad in 2011 UEFA European Under-21 Championship. He appeared only two times in the tournament, including in the opening match against Czech Republic. Ukraine was eliminated early as they finished last in Group B, collecting only one point.

=== 2015–2016: return and UEFA Euro 2016 campaign ===
In March 2015, after a good run on club level, Kravets received his first call-up in four years for the UEFA Euro 2016 qualifying match against Spain and the friendly against Latvia. He played in the first match against Spain, entering as a substitute in the 32nd minute for the injured Roman Zozulya and played until 91st minute when he was injured himself, making way for Pylyp Budkivskiy. Two months later, on 9 June 2015, Kravets scored his first international goal in a 2–1 friendly win over Georgia, netting 11 minutes after entering in the pitch. Five days later, Kravets played his second qualifying match, netting the opener of a 3–0 home victory over Luxembourg.

Kravets continued to be part of the team for the remaining part of qualifying campaign, netting two more goals, respectively against Belarus on 5 September and Macedonia on 9 October. Ukraine concluded Group C in third place with 19 points which helped them advance to the play-off round. Kravets played in both legs of the play-off round, where Ukraine faced Slovenia, winning 2–0 at home and drawing 1–1 away, qualifying to the final tournament 3–1 on aggregate.

On 21 May 2016, Kravets was named in Ukraine's preliminary 29-man squad for UEFA Euro 2016, but was one of the six played left out of final 23-man UEFA Euro 2016 squad on 31 May.

=== 2016–2018: 2018 FIFA World Cup qualification ===
He returned to the national team in October of that year for the second and third round of 2018 FIFA World Cup qualification campaign against Turkey and Kosovo; he scored in both matches, lifting his tally up to six international goals, as Ukraine collected four points.

Kravets continued to appear for the team regularly in the remaining part of the qualifying campaign, scoring the lone goal of the match versus Finland. Ukraine, however, failed to qualify for the final tournament after finishing third in Group I.

== Personal life ==
His wife Anna is an economist. He met her in the bowling-club. On 25 November 2017, Kravets become a father for the first time when his wife gave birth to two twin boys. Kravets idol and favourite footballer is former Brazilian midfielder Kaká. He is the reason why Kravets selected number 22 (the birthday of Kaká) jersey while at Dynamo Kyiv, and pointing his fingers in the sky every time he scored.

== Career statistics ==
=== Club ===
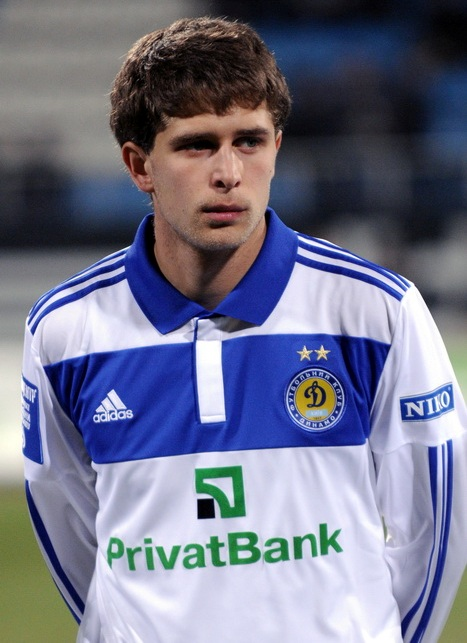
Kravets playing for Dynamo Kyiv

As of 20 August 2020.

Club statistics
| Club | Season | League | | | Cup | | Continental | | Other | | Total | |
| Club | Season | Division | Apps | Goals | Apps | Goals | Apps | Goals | Apps | Goals | Apps | Goals |
|---|---|---|---|---|---|---|---|---|---|---|---|---|
| Dynamo Kyiv | 2006–07 | Ukrainian Premier League | 1 | 0 | 0 | 0 | — | | — | | 1 | 0 |
| Dynamo Kyiv | 2007–08 | Ukrainian Premier League | 11 | 3 | 3 | 0 | 1 (Note: All appearance(s) in UEFA Champions League) | 0 | — | | 15 | 3 |
| Dynamo Kyiv | 2008–09 | Ukrainian Premier League | 12 | 4 | 1 | 1 | 10 (Note: Six appearances in UEFA Champions League, four appearances and two goals in UEFA Europa League) | 2 | — | | 23 | 7 |
| Dynamo Kyiv | 2009–10 | Ukrainian Premier League | 9 | 1 | 1 | 0 | 1 | 0 | — | | 11 | 1 |
| Dynamo Kyiv | 2010–11 | Ukrainian Premier League | 11 | 3 | 2 | 0 | 5 (Note: All appearance(s) in UEFA Europa League) | 0 | — | | 18 | 3 |
| Dynamo Kyiv | 2011–12 | Ukrainian Premier League | 0 | 0 | 0 | 0 | 0 | 0 | — | | 0 | 0 |
| Dynamo Kyiv | 2012–13 | Ukrainian Premier League | 1 | 2 | 0 | 0 | — | | — | | 1 | 2 |
| Dynamo Kyiv | 2013–14 | Ukrainian Premier League | 0 | 0 | 0 | 0 | 1 | 0 | — | | 1 | 0 |
| Dynamo Kyiv | 2014–15 | Ukrainian Premier League | 24 | 15 | 5 | 2 | 10 | 2 | 1 (Note: Appearance in Ukrainian Super Cup) | 0 | 40 | 19 |
| Dynamo Kyiv | 2015–16 | Ukrainian Premier League | 12 | 2 | 1 | 1 | 4 | 0 | 1 | 0 | 18 | 3 |
| Dynamo Kyiv | 2017–18 | Ukrainian Premier League | 9 | 3 | 1 | 2 | 5 (Note: One appearance in UEFA Champions League, four appearances in UEFA Europa League) | 0 | — | | 15 | 5 |
| Dynamo Kyiv | Total | | 90 | 33 | 14 | 6 | 37 | 4 | 2 | 0 | 143 | 43 |
| Arsenal Kyiv (loan) | 2013–14 | Ukrainian Premier League | 10 | 3 | 1 | 0 | — | | — | | 11 | 3 |
| Stuttgart (loan) | 2015–16 | Bundesliga | 15 | 1 | 1 | 0 | — | | — | | 16 | 1 |
| Granada (loan) | 2016–17 | La Liga | 26 | 5 | 0 | 0 | — | | — | | 26 | 5 |
| Kayserispor | 2017–18 | Süper Lig | 13 | 3 | 1 | 1 | — | | — | | 14 | 4 |
| Kayserispor | 2018–19 | Süper Lig | 23 | 5 | 4 | 3 | — | | — | | 27 | 8 |
| Kayserispor | 2019–20 | Süper Lig | 19 | 8 | 3 | 1 | — | | — | | 22 | 9 |
| Kayserispor | Total | | 55 | 16 | 8 | 5 | — | | — | | 63 | 21 |
| Career total | | | 196 | 58 | 24 | 11 | 37 | 4 | 2 | 0 | 259 | 73 |

=== International ===
Appearances and goals by national team and year
| National team | Year | Apps | Goals |
|---|---|---|---|
| Ukraine | 2011 | 2 | 0 |
| Ukraine | 2015 | 10 | 4 |
| Ukraine | 2016 | 4 | 3 |
| Ukraine | 2017 | 4 | 0 |
| Ukraine | 2018 | 2 | 1 |
| Ukraine | 2019 | 1 | 0 |
| Total | | 23 | 8 |

=== International goals ===
As of 23 March 2018. Ukraine score listed first, score column indicates score after each Kravets goal.

International goals by date, venue, cap, opponent, score, result and competition
| No. | Date | Venue | Cap | Opponent | Score | Result | Competition |
|---|---|---|---|---|---|---|---|
| 1 | 9 June 2015 | Linzer Stadion, Linz, Austria | 5 | Georgia | 1–0 | 2–1 | Friendly |
| 2 | 14 June 2015 | Arena Lviv, Lviv, Ukraine | 6 | Luxembourg | 1–0 | 3–0 | UEFA Euro 2016 qualification |
| 3 | 5 September 2015 | Arena Lviv, Lviv, Ukraine | 7 | Belarus | 1–0 | 3–1 | UEFA Euro 2016 qualification |
| 4 | 9 October 2015 | Philip II Arena, Skopje, Macedonia | 9 | Macedonia | 2–0 | 2–0 | UEFA Euro 2016 qualification |
| 5 | 6 October 2016 | Konya Büyükşehir Stadium, Konya, Turkey | 14 | Turkey | 2–0 | 2–2 | 2018 FIFA World Cup qualification |
| 6 | 9 October 2016 | Marshal Józef Piłsudski Stadium, Kraków, Poland | 15 | Kosovo | 1–0 | 3–0 | 2018 FIFA World Cup qualification |
| 7 | 12 November 2016 | Chornomorets Stadium, Odesa, Ukraine | 16 | Finland | 1–0 | 1–0 | 2018 FIFA World Cup qualification |
| 8 | 23 March 2018 | Estadio Municipal de Marbella, Marbella, Spain | 21 | Saudi Arabia | 1–0 | 1–1 | Friendly |

== Honours ==
=== Club ===
FC Dynamo Kyiv

- Ukrainian Premier League: 2008–09, 2014–15
- Ukrainian Cup: 2013–14, 2014–15
- Ukrainian Super Cup: 2007
