= UEFA Euro 2016 qualifying Group G =

Football tournament qualification stage

The UEFA Euro 2016 qualifying Group G was one of the nine groups to decide which teams would qualify for the UEFA Euro 2016 finals tournament. Group G consisted of six teams: Russia, Sweden, Austria, Montenegro, Moldova, and Liechtenstein, where they played against each other home-and-away in a round-robin format.

The top two teams, Austria and Russia, qualified directly for the finals. As third-placed Sweden weren't the highest-ranked among all third-placed teams, they advanced to the play-offs, where they won against Denmark and thus qualified as well.

== Standings ==
Pos	Team	Pld	W	D	L	GF	GA	GD	Pts	Qualification	(Austria)	(Russia)	(Sweden)	(Montenegro)	(Liechtenstein)	(Moldova)
1	Austria	10	9	1	0	22	5	+17	28	Qualify for final tournament	—	1–0	1–1	1–0	3–0	1–0
2	Russia	10	6	2	2	21	5	+16	20	Qualify for final tournament	0–1	—	1–0	2–0	4–0	1–1
3	Sweden	10	5	3	2	15	9	+6	18	Advance to play-offs	1–4	1–1	—	3–1	2–0	2–0
4	Montenegro	10	3	2	5	10	13	−3	11		2–3	0–3 (Note: The Montenegro v Russia match was awarded as a 3–0 win to Russia after being abandoned at 0–0 due to crowd violence and a scuffle between players.)	1–1	—	2–0	2–0
5	Liechtenstein	10	1	2	7	2	26	−24	5		0–5	0–7	0–2	0–0	—	1–1
6	Moldova	10	0	2	8	4	16	−12	2		1–2	1–2	0–2	0–2	0–1	—

Source: UEFA
Rules for classification: Qualification tiebreakers

== Matches ==
The fixtures were released by UEFA the same day as the draw, which was held on 23 February 2014 in Nice. Times are CET/CEST, (Note: CET (UTC+1) for matches on 15 November 2014 and 27 March 2015, and CEST (UTC+2) for all other matches.) as listed by UEFA (local times are in parentheses).

8 September 2014
18:00
(20:00 UTC+4)

Russia	4–0	Liechtenstein
M. Büchel 4' (o.g.); Burgmeier 50' (o.g.); Kombarov 54' (pen.); Dzyuba 65'	Report

Arena Khimki, Khimki
Attendance: 11,236
Referee: Sébastien Delferière (Belgium)
8 September 2014
20:45
(20:45 UTC+2)

Austria	1–1	Sweden
Alaba 7' (pen.)	Report	Zengin 12'

Ernst-Happel-Stadion, Vienna
Attendance: 48,500
Referee: Pavel Královec (Czech Republic)
8 September 2014
20:45
(20:45 UTC+2)

Montenegro	2–0	Moldova
Vučinić 45+2'; Tomašević 73'	Report

Stadion pod Goricom, Podgorica
Attendance: 8,759
Referee: Aleksei Kulbakov (Belarus)

9 October 2014
20:45
(20:45 UTC+2)

Liechtenstein	0–0	Montenegro
	Report

Rheinpark Stadion, Vaduz
Attendance: 2,790
Referee: Simon Lee Evans (Wales)
9 October 2014
20:45
(21:45 UTC+3)

Moldova	1–2	Austria
Dedov 27' (pen.)	Report	Alaba 12' (pen.); Janko 51'

Zimbru Stadium, Chișinău
Attendance: 9,381
Referee: Jorge Sousa (Portugal)
9 October 2014
20:45
(20:45 UTC+2)

Sweden	1–1	Russia
Toivonen 49'	Report	Kokorin 10'

Friends Arena, Solna
Attendance: 49,023
Referee: Nicola Rizzoli (Italy)

12 October 2014
18:00
(18:00 UTC+2)

Austria	1–0	Montenegro
Okotie 24'	Report

Ernst-Happel-Stadion, Vienna
Attendance: 44,200
Referee: Bas Nijhuis (Netherlands)
12 October 2014
18:00
(20:00 UTC+4)

Russia	1–1	Moldova
Dzyuba 73' (pen.)	Report	Epureanu 74'

Otkrytiye Arena, Moscow
Attendance: 30,017
Referee: Kristinn Jakobsson (Iceland)
12 October 2014
20:45
(20:45 UTC+2)

Sweden	2–0	Liechtenstein
Zengin 34'; Durmaz 46'	Report

Friends Arena, Solna
Attendance: 22,528
Referee: Gediminas Mažeika (Lithuania)

15 November 2014
18:00
(18:00 UTC+1)

Austria	1–0	Russia
Okotie 73'	Report

Ernst-Happel-Stadion, Vienna
Attendance: 47,500
Referee: Martin Atkinson (England)
15 November 2014
18:00
(19:00 UTC+2)

Moldova	0–1	Liechtenstein
	Report	Burgmeier 74'

Zimbru Stadium, Chișinău
Attendance: 6,843
Referee: Mattias Gestranius (Finland)
15 November 2014
20:45
(20:45 UTC+1)

Montenegro	1–1	Sweden
Jovetić 80' (pen.)	Report	Ibrahimović 9'

Stadion pod Goricom, Podgorica
Attendance: 10,538
Referee: William Collum (Scotland)

27 March 2015
20:45
(20:45 UTC+1)

Liechtenstein	0–5	Austria
	Report	Harnik 14'; Janko 16'; Alaba 59'; Junuzović 74'; Arnautović 90+3'

Rheinpark Stadion, Vaduz
Attendance: 5,864
Referee: Felix Zwayer (Germany)
27 March 2015
20:45
(21:45 UTC+2)

Moldova	0–2	Sweden
	Report	Ibrahimović 46', 84' (pen.)

Zimbru Stadium, Chișinău
Attendance: 10,375
Referee: Ivan Bebek (Croatia)
27 March 2015
20:45
(20:45 UTC+1)

Montenegro	0–3 Awarded (Note: The Montenegro v Russia match was awarded as a 3–0 win to Russia after it was abandoned in the 67th minute at 0–0 due to crowd violence and a scuffle between players. This was the second delay of the match as in the first minute Russian goalkeeper Igor Akinfeev was hit by a flare thrown from the crowd and stretchered off, causing a 33-minute delay. Montenegro also had to play their next home qualifying game behind closed doors, and the Montenegrin and Russian FAs were fined €50,000 and €25,000 respectively.)	Russia
	Report

Stadion pod Goricom, Podgorica
Referee: Deniz Aytekin (Germany)

14 June 2015
18:00
(18:00 UTC+2)

Liechtenstein	1–1	Moldova
Wieser 20'	Report	Boghiu 43'

Rheinpark Stadion, Vaduz
Attendance: 2,080
Referee: Libor Kovařík (Czech Republic)
14 June 2015
18:00
(19:00 UTC+3)

Russia	0–1	Austria
	Report	Janko 33'

Otkrytiye Arena, Moscow
Attendance: 33,750
Referee: Milorad Mažić (Serbia)
14 June 2015
20:45
(20:45 UTC+2)

Sweden	3–1	Montenegro
Berg 37'; Ibrahimović 40', 44'	Report	Damjanović 64' (pen.)

Friends Arena, Solna
Attendance: 32,224
Referee: Hüseyin Göçek (Turkey)

5 September 2015
18:00
(19:00 UTC+3)

Russia	1–0	Sweden
Dzyuba 38'	Report

Otkrytiye Arena, Moscow
Attendance: 43,768
Referee: Mark Clattenburg (England)
5 September 2015
20:45
(20:45 UTC+2)

Austria	1–0	Moldova
Junuzović 52'	Report

Ernst-Happel-Stadion, Vienna
Attendance: 48,500
Referee: Aleksandar Stavrev (Macedonia)
5 September 2015
20:45
(20:45 UTC+2)

Montenegro	2–0	Liechtenstein
Bećiraj 38'; Jovetić 56'	Report

Stadion pod Goricom, Podgorica
Attendance: 0 (Note: Played behind closed doors because of a sanction imposed on Montenegro after the abandoned match against Russia.)
Referee: Javier Estrada Fernández (Spain)

8 September 2015
20:45
(20:45 UTC+2)

Liechtenstein	0–7	Russia
	Report	Dzyuba 21', 45', 73', 90'; Kokorin 40' (pen.); Smolov 77'; Dzagoev 85'

Rheinpark Stadion, Vaduz
Attendance: 2,874
Referee: Bobby Madden (Scotland)
8 September 2015
20:45
(21:45 UTC+3)

Moldova	0–2	Montenegro
	Report	Savić 9'; Racu 65' (o.g.)

Zimbru Stadium, Chișinău
Attendance: 6,243
Referee: Sébastien Delferière (Belgium)
8 September 2015
20:45
(20:45 UTC+2)

Sweden	1–4	Austria
Ibrahimović 90+1'	Report	Alaba 9' (pen.); Harnik 38', 88'; Janko 77'

Friends Arena, Solna
Attendance: 48,355
Referee: Carlos Velasco Carballo (Spain)

9 October 2015
20:45
(20:45 UTC+2)

Liechtenstein	0–2	Sweden
	Report	Berg 18'; Ibrahimović 55'

Rheinpark Stadion, Vaduz
Attendance: 4,740
Referee: Liran Liany (Israel)
9 October 2015
20:45
(21:45 UTC+3)

Moldova	1–2	Russia
Cebotaru 85'	Report	Ignashevich 58'; Dzyuba 78'

Zimbru Stadium, Chișinău
Attendance: 10,244
Referee: Michael Koukoulakis (Greece)
9 October 2015
20:45
(20:45 UTC+2)

Montenegro	2–3	Austria
Vučinić 32'; Bećiraj 68'	Report	Janko 55'; Arnautović 81'; Sabitzer 90+2'

Stadion pod Goricom, Podgorica
Attendance: 7,107
Referee: Daniele Orsato (Italy)

12 October 2015
18:00
(18:00 UTC+2)

Austria	3–0	Liechtenstein
Arnautović 12'; Janko 54', 57'	Report

Ernst-Happel-Stadion, Vienna
Attendance: 48,500
Referee: Miroslav Zelinka (Czech Republic)
12 October 2015
18:00
(19:00 UTC+3)

Russia	2–0	Montenegro
Kuzmin 33'; Kokorin 37' (pen.)	Report

Otkrytiye Arena, Moscow
Attendance: 35,604
Referee: Svein Oddvar Moen (Norway)
12 October 2015
18:00
(18:00 UTC+2)

Sweden	2–0	Moldova
Ibrahimović 23'; Zengin 47'	Report

Friends Arena, Solna
Attendance: 25,351
Referee: Luca Banti (Italy)

== Goalscorers ==
There were 71 goals scored in 30 matches, for an average of 2.37 goals per match. (Note: The goal tally takes into account the original result of fixtures that were subsequently forfeited, not the awarded scoreline.)

8 goals

- (Russia national football team) Artem Dzyuba
- (Sweden men's national football team) Zlatan Ibrahimović

7 goals

- (Austria national football team) Marc Janko

4 goals

- (Austria national football team) David Alaba

3 goals

- (Austria national football team) Marko Arnautović
- (Austria national football team) Martin Harnik
- (Russia national football team) Aleksandr Kokorin
- (Sweden men's national football team) Erkan Zengin

2 goals

- (Austria national football team) Zlatko Junuzović
- (Austria national football team) Rubin Okotie
- (Montenegro national football team) Fatos Bećiraj
- (Montenegro national football team) Stevan Jovetić
- (Montenegro national football team) Mirko Vučinić
- (Sweden men's national football team) Marcus Berg

1 goal

- (Austria national football team) Marcel Sabitzer
- (Liechtenstein national football team) Franz Burgmeier
- (Liechtenstein national football team) Sandro Wieser
- (Moldova national football team) Gheorghe Boghiu
- (Moldova national football team) Eugeniu Cebotaru
- (Moldova national football team) Alexandru Dedov
- (Moldova national football team) Alexandru Epureanu
- (Montenegro national football team) Dejan Damjanović
- (Montenegro national football team) Stefan Savić
- (Montenegro national football team) Žarko Tomašević
- (Russia national football team) Alan Dzagoev
- (Russia national football team) Sergei Ignashevich
- (Russia national football team) Dmitri Kombarov
- (Russia national football team) Oleg Kuzmin
- (Russia national football team) Fyodor Smolov
- (Sweden men's national football team) Jimmy Durmaz
- (Sweden men's national football team) Ola Toivonen

1 own goal

- (Liechtenstein national football team) Martin Büchel (against Russia)
- (Liechtenstein national football team) Franz Burgmeier (against Russia)
- (Moldova national football team) Petru Racu (against Montenegro)

== Discipline ==
A player was automatically suspended for the next match for the following offences:

- Receiving a red card (red card suspensions could be extended for serious offences)
- Receiving three yellow cards in three different matches, as well as after fifth and any subsequent yellow card (yellow card suspensions were carried forward to the play-offs, but not the finals or any other future international matches)

The following suspensions were served during the qualifying matches:

Team	Player	Offence(s)	Suspended for match(es)
Austria	Marc Janko	(red card) vs Moldova (9 October 2014)	vs Montenegro (12 October 2014)
Liechtenstein	Mario Frick	(yellow card) vs Russia (8 September 2014); (yellow card) vs Montenegro (9 October 2014); (yellow card) vs Sweden (12 October 2014)	vs Moldova (15 November 2014)
Liechtenstein	Sandro Wieser	(yellow card) vs Russia (8 September 2014); (yellow card) vs Moldova (14 June 2015); (yellow card) vs Montenegro (5 September 2015)	vs Russia (8 September 2015)
Liechtenstein	Daniel Kaufmann	(red card) vs Russia (8 September 2015)	vs Sweden (9 October 2015)
Moldova	Alexandru Gațcan	(yellow card) vs Sweden (27 March 2015); (yellow card) vs Liechtenstein (14 June 2015); (yellow card) vs Montenegro (8 September 2015)	vs Russia (9 October 2015)
Moldova	Victor Golovatenco	(yellow card) vs Russia (12 October 2014); (yellow card) vs Sweden (27 March 2015); (yellow card) vs Montenegro (8 September 2015)	vs Russia (9 October 2015)
Montenegro	Marko Simić	(yellow card) vs Liechtenstein (9 October 2014); (yellow card) vs Austria (12 October 2014); (yellow card) vs Sweden (14 June 2015)	vs Liechtenstein (5 September 2015)
Montenegro	Mirko Vučinić	(yellow card) (red card) vs Austria (9 October 2015)	vs Russia (12 October 2015)
Sweden	Andreas Granqvist	(yellow card) (yellow-red card) vs Moldova (27 March 2015)	vs Montenegro (14 June 2015)
Sweden	Kim Källström	(yellow card) vs Austria (8 September 2014); (yellow card) vs Montenegro (15 November 2014); (yellow card) vs Montenegro (14 June 2015)	vs Russia (5 September 2015)

Montenegro coach Branko Brnović served a one-match touchline ban and missed Montenegro's match against Russia (12 October 2015) after being sent off against Austria (9 October 2015).
