= UEFA Euro 2016 qualifying Group B =

Qualifier - Group B

The UEFA Euro 2016 qualifying Group B was one of the nine groups to decide which teams would qualify for the UEFA Euro 2016 finals tournament. Group B consisted of six teams: Bosnia and Herzegovina, Belgium, Israel, Wales, Cyprus, and Andorra, where they played against each other home-and-away in a round-robin format.

The top two teams, Belgium and Wales, qualified directly for the finals. As third-placed Bosnia and Herzegovina weren't the highest-ranked among all third-placed teams, they advanced to the play-offs, where they lost to the Republic of Ireland and thus failed to qualify.

== Standings ==
Pos	Team	Pld	W	D	L	GF	GA	GD	Pts	Qualification	(Belgium)	(Wales)	(Bosnia and Herzegovina)	(Israel)	(Cyprus)	(Andorra)
1	Belgium	10	7	2	1	24	5	+19	23	Qualify for final tournament	—	0–0	3–1	3–1	5–0	6–0
2	Wales	10	6	3	1	11	4	+7	21	Qualify for final tournament	1–0	—	0–0	0–0	2–1	2–0
3	Bosnia and Herzegovina	10	5	2	3	17	12	+5	17	Advance to play-offs	1–1	2–0	—	3–1	1–2	3–0
4	Israel	10	4	1	5	16	14	+2	13		0–1	0–3	3–0	—	1–2	4–0
5	Cyprus	10	4	0	6	16	17	−1	12		0–1	0–1	2–3	1–2	—	5–0
6	Andorra	10	0	0	10	4	36	−32	0		1–4	1–2	0–3	1–4	1–3	—

Source: UEFA
Rules for classification: Qualification tiebreakers

== Matches ==
The fixtures were released by UEFA the same day as the draw, which was held on 23 February 2014 in Nice. Times are CET/CEST, (Note: CET (UTC+1) for matches on 16 November 2014 and 28 March 2015, and CEST (UTC+2) for all other matches.) as listed by UEFA (local times are in parentheses).

9 September 2014
20:45
(20:45 UTC+2)

Andorra	1–2	Wales
Lima 6' (pen.)	Report	Bale 22', 81'

Estadi Nacional, Andorra la Vella
Attendance: 3,150
Referee: Slavko Vinčić (Slovenia)
9 September 2014
20:45
(20:45 UTC+2)

Bosnia and Herzegovina	1–2	Cyprus
Ibišević 6'	Report	Christofi 45', 73'

Bilino Polje, Zenica
Attendance: 12,100
Referee: Yevhen Aranovskiy (Ukraine)

10 October 2014
20:45
(20:45 UTC+2)

Belgium	6–0	Andorra
De Bruyne 31' (pen.), 34'; Chadli 37'; Origi 59'; Mertens 65', 68'	Report

King Baudouin Stadium, Brussels
Attendance: 45,459
Referee: Serhiy Boyko (Ukraine)
10 October 2014
20:45
(21:45 UTC+3)

Cyprus	1–2	Israel
Makrides 67'	Report	Damari 38'; Ben Haim II 45'

GSP Stadium, Nicosia
Attendance: 19,164
Referee: Daniele Orsato (Italy)
10 October 2014
20:45
(19:45 UTC+1)

Wales	0–0	Bosnia and Herzegovina
	Report

Cardiff City Stadium, Cardiff
Attendance: 30,741
Referee: Vladislav Bezborodov (Russia)

13 October 2014
20:45
(20:45 UTC+2)

Andorra	1–4	Israel
Lima 15' (pen.)	Report	Damari 3', 41', 82'; Hemed 90+6' (pen.)

Estadi Nacional, Andorra la Vella
Attendance: 2,032
Referee: Cristian Balaj (Romania)
13 October 2014
20:45
(20:45 UTC+2)

Bosnia and Herzegovina	1–1	Belgium
Džeko 28'	Report	Nainggolan 51'

Bilino Polje, Zenica
Attendance: 12,070
Referee: Luca Banti (Italy)
13 October 2014
20:45
(19:45 UTC+1)

Wales	2–1	Cyprus
Cotterill 13'; Robson-Kanu 23'	Report	Laban 36'

Cardiff City Stadium, Cardiff
Attendance: 21,273
Referee: Manuel Gräfe (Germany)

16 November 2014
18:00
(18:00 UTC+1)

Belgium	0–0	Wales
	Report

King Baudouin Stadium, Brussels
Attendance: 41,535
Referee: Pavel Královec (Czech Republic)
16 November 2014
18:00
(19:00 UTC+2)

Cyprus	5–0	Andorra
Merkis 9'; Efrem 31', 42', 60'; Christofi 87' (pen.)	Report

GSP Stadium, Nicosia
Attendance: 6,078
Referee: Mark Clattenburg (England)
16 November 2014
20:45
(21:45 UTC+2)

Israel	3–0	Bosnia and Herzegovina
Vermouth 36'; Damari 45'; Zahavi 70'	Report

Sammy Ofer Stadium, Haifa
Attendance: 28,300
Referee: Antonio Mateu Lahoz (Spain)

28 March 2015
18:00
(20:00 UTC+3) (Note: The Israel v Wales match was originally to kick off at 20:45 (22:45 UTC+3), but was moved to 18:00 (20:00 UTC+3) as matches cannot kick off later than 22:00 local time according to UEFA's guidelines.)

Israel	0–3	Wales
	Report	Ramsey 45+1'; Bale 50', 77'

Sammy Ofer Stadium, Haifa
Attendance: 30,200
Referee: Milorad Mažić (Serbia)
28 March 2015
20:45
(20:45 UTC+1)

Andorra	0–3	Bosnia and Herzegovina
	Report	Džeko 13', 49', 62'

Estadi Nacional, Andorra la Vella
Attendance: 2,498
Referee: István Vad (Hungary)
28 March 2015
20:45
(20:45 UTC+1)

Belgium	5–0	Cyprus
Fellaini 21', 66'; Benteke 35'; Hazard 67'; Batshuayi 80'	Report

King Baudouin Stadium, Brussels
Attendance: 45,213
Referee: Ovidiu Hațegan (Romania)

31 March 2015 (Note: The Israel v Belgium match was originally to be played on 9 September 2014, 20:45 (21:45 UTC+3), but was postponed due to the 2014 Israel–Gaza conflict.)
20:45
(21:45 UTC+3)

Israel	0–1	Belgium
	Report	Fellaini 9'

Teddy Stadium, Jerusalem
Attendance: 29,750
Referee: Mark Clattenburg (England)

12 June 2015
20:45
(20:45 UTC+2)

Andorra	1–3	Cyprus
Dossa Júnior 2' (o.g.)	Report	Mitidis 13', 45', 53'

Estadi Nacional, Andorra la Vella
Attendance: 1,054
Referee: Tobias Welz (Germany)
12 June 2015
20:45
(20:45 UTC+2)

Bosnia and Herzegovina	3–1	Israel
Višća 42', 75'; Džeko 45+2' (pen.)	Report	Ben Haim II 41'

Bilino Polje, Zenica
Attendance: 12,100
Referee: Ruddy Buquet (France)
12 June 2015
20:45
(19:45 UTC+1)

Wales	1–0	Belgium
Bale 25'	Report

Cardiff City Stadium, Cardiff
Attendance: 33,280
Referee: Felix Brych (Germany)

3 September 2015
20:45
(20:45 UTC+2)

Belgium	3–1	Bosnia and Herzegovina
Fellaini 23'; De Bruyne 44'; Hazard 78' (pen.)	Report	Džeko 15'

King Baudouin Stadium, Brussels
Attendance: 42,975
Referee: Jorge Sousa (Portugal)
3 September 2015
20:45
(21:45 UTC+3)

Cyprus	0–1	Wales
	Report	Bale 82'

GSP Stadium, Nicosia
Attendance: 14,492
Referee: Szymon Marciniak (Poland)
3 September 2015
20:45
(21:45 UTC+3)

Israel	4–0	Andorra
Zahavi 3'; Bitton 22'; Hemed 26' (pen.); Dabbur 38'	Report

Sammy Ofer Stadium, Haifa
Attendance: 22,650
Referee: Tamás Bognár (Hungary)

6 September 2015
18:00
(17:00 UTC+1)

Wales	0–0	Israel
	Report

Cardiff City Stadium, Cardiff
Attendance: 32,653
Referee: Ivan Bebek (Croatia)
6 September 2015
20:45
(20:45 UTC+2)

Bosnia and Herzegovina	3–0	Andorra
Bičakčić 14'; Džeko 30'; Lulić 45'	Report

Bilino Polje, Zenica
Attendance: 6,830
Referee: Arnold Hunter (Northern Ireland)
6 September 2015
20:45
(21:45 UTC+3)

Cyprus	0–1	Belgium
	Report	Hazard 86'

GSP Stadium, Nicosia
Attendance: 11,866
Referee: Vladislav Bezborodov (Russia)

10 October 2015
20:45
(20:45 UTC+2)

Andorra	1–4	Belgium
Lima 51' (pen.)	Report	Nainggolan 19'; De Bruyne 42'; Hazard 56' (pen.); Depoitre 64'

Estadi Nacional, Andorra la Vella
Attendance: 3,032
Referee: Paweł Gil (Poland)
10 October 2015
20:45
(20:45 UTC+2)

Bosnia and Herzegovina	2–0	Wales
Đurić 71'; Ibišević 90'	Report

Bilino Polje, Zenica
Attendance: 10,250
Referee: Alberto Undiano Mallenco (Spain)
10 October 2015
20:45
(21:45 UTC+3)

Israel	1–2	Cyprus
Bitton 76'	Report	Dossa Júnior 58'; Demetriou 80'

Teddy Stadium, Jerusalem
Attendance: 25,300
Referee: Jorge Sousa (Portugal)

13 October 2015
20:45
(20:45 UTC+2)

Belgium	3–1	Israel
Mertens 64'; De Bruyne 78'; Hazard 84'	Report	Hemed 88'

King Baudouin Stadium, Brussels
Attendance: 39,773
Referee: Anastasios Sidiropoulos (Greece)
13 October 2015
20:45
(21:45 UTC+3)

Cyprus	2–3	Bosnia and Herzegovina
Charalambidis 32'; Mitidis 41'	Report	Medunjanin 13', 44'; Đurić 67'

GSP Stadium, Nicosia
Attendance: 17,687
Referee: Anthony Taylor (England)
13 October 2015
20:45
(19:45 UTC+1)

Wales	2–0	Andorra
Ramsey 50'; Bale 86'	Report

Cardiff City Stadium, Cardiff
Attendance: 33,280
Referee: Kevin Blom (Netherlands)

== Goalscorers ==
There were 88 goals scored in 30 matches, for an average of 2.93 goals per match.

7 goals

- (Bosnia and Herzegovina national football team) Edin Džeko
- (Wales national football team) Gareth Bale

5 goals

- (Belgium national football team) Kevin De Bruyne
- (Belgium national football team) Eden Hazard
- (Israel national football team) Omer Damari

4 goals

- (Belgium national football team) Marouane Fellaini
- (Cyprus national football team) Nestoras Mitidis

3 goals

- (Andorra national football team) Ildefons Lima
- (Belgium national football team) Dries Mertens
- (Cyprus national football team) Demetris Christofi
- (Cyprus national football team) Georgios Efrem
- (Israel national football team) Tomer Hemed

2 goals

- (Belgium national football team) Radja Nainggolan
- (Bosnia and Herzegovina national football team) Milan Đurić
- (Bosnia and Herzegovina national football team) Vedad Ibišević
- (Bosnia and Herzegovina national football team) Haris Medunjanin
- (Bosnia and Herzegovina national football team) Edin Višća
- (Israel national football team) Tal Ben Haim II
- (Israel national football team) Nir Bitton
- (Israel national football team) Eran Zahavi
- (Wales national football team) Aaron Ramsey

1 goal

- (Belgium national football team) Michy Batshuayi
- (Belgium national football team) Christian Benteke
- (Belgium national football team) Nacer Chadli
- (Belgium national football team) Laurent Depoitre
- (Belgium national football team) Divock Origi
- (Bosnia and Herzegovina national football team) Ermin Bičakčić
- (Bosnia and Herzegovina national football team) Senad Lulić
- (Cyprus national football team) Constantinos Charalambidis
- (Cyprus national football team) Jason Demetriou
- (Cyprus national football team) Dossa Júnior
- (Cyprus national football team) Vincent Laban
- (Cyprus national football team) Constantinos Makrides
- (Cyprus national football team) Giorgos Merkis
- (Israel national football team) Moanes Dabour
- (Israel national football team) Gil Vermouth
- (Wales national football team) David Cotterill
- (Wales national football team) Hal Robson-Kanu

1 own goal

- (Cyprus national football team) Dossa Júnior (against Andorra)

== Discipline ==
A player was automatically suspended for the next match for the following offences:

- Receiving a red card (red card suspensions could be extended for serious offences)
- Receiving three yellow cards in three different matches, as well as after fifth and any subsequent yellow card (yellow card suspensions were carried forward to the play-offs, but not the finals or any other future international matches)

The following suspensions were served during the qualifying matches:

Team	Player	Offence(s)	Suspended for match(es)
Andorra	Moisés San Nicolás	(yellow card) (yellow-red card) vs Hungary (15 October 2013) (Note: The suspension was carried over from the 2014 FIFA World Cup qualification.)	vs Wales (9 September 2014)
Andorra	Márcio Vieira	(yellow card) vs Wales (9 September 2014); (yellow card) vs Belgium (10 October 2014); (yellow card) vs Bosnia and Herzegovina (28 March 2015)	vs Cyprus (12 June 2015)
Andorra	Jordi Rubio	(yellow card) vs Israel (13 October 2014); (yellow card) vs Cyprus (12 June 2015); (yellow card) vs Israel (3 September 2015)	vs Bosnia and Herzegovina (6 September 2015)
Andorra	Josep Ayala	(yellow card) vs Belgium (10 October 2014); (yellow card) vs Cyprus (12 June 2015); (yellow card) vs Bosnia and Herzegovina (6 September 2015)	vs Belgium (10 October 2015)
Andorra	Cristian Martínez	(yellow card) vs Israel (13 October 2014); (yellow card) vs Cyprus (16 November 2014); (yellow card) vs Bosnia and Herzegovina (6 September 2015)	vs Belgium (10 October 2015)
Andorra	Víctor Rodríguez	(red card) vs Bosnia and Herzegovina (6 September 2015)	vs Belgium (10 October 2015) vs Wales (13 October 2015)
Andorra	Marc Rebés	(yellow card) vs Cyprus (12 June 2015); (yellow card) vs Bosnia and Herzegovina (6 September 2015); (yellow card) vs Belgium (10 October 2015)	vs Wales (13 October 2015)
Belgium	Vincent Kompany	(yellow card) (yellow-red card) vs Israel (31 March 2015)	vs Wales (12 June 2015)
Bosnia and Herzegovina	Toni Šunjić	(red card) vs Israel (16 November 2014)	vs Andorra (28 March 2015)
Bosnia and Herzegovina	Muhamed Bešić	(red card) vs Andorra (6 September 2015)	vs Wales (10 October 2015) vs Cyprus (13 October 2015)
Cyprus	Vincent Laban	(yellow card) vs Bosnia and Herzegovina (9 September 2014); (yellow card) vs Israel (10 October 2014); (yellow card) vs Andorra (12 June 2015)	vs Wales (3 September 2015)
Israel	Eitan Tibi	(yellow card) (yellow-red card) vs Wales (28 March 2015)	vs Belgium (31 March 2015)
Israel	Lior Refaelov	(yellow card) vs Cyprus (10 October 2014); (yellow card) vs Wales (28 March 2015); (yellow card) vs Belgium (31 March 2015)	vs Bosnia and Herzegovina (12 June 2015)
Israel	Sheran Yeini	(yellow card) vs Bosnia and Herzegovina (16 November 2014); (yellow card) vs Belgium (31 March 2015); (yellow card) vs Bosnia and Herzegovina (12 June 2015)	vs Andorra (3 September 2015)
Israel	Nir Bitton	(yellow card) vs Bosnia and Herzegovina (16 November 2014); (yellow card) vs Wales (6 September 2015); (yellow card) vs Cyprus (10 October 2015)	vs Belgium (13 October 2015)
Wales	Andy King	(red card) vs Cyprus (13 October 2014)	vs Belgium (16 November 2014) vs Israel (28 March 2015)
Wales	Joe Allen	(yellow card) vs Andorra (9 September 2014); (yellow card) vs Belgium (16 November 2014); (yellow card) vs Belgium (12 June 2015)	vs Cyprus (3 September 2015)
