= Eugeniu Cebotaru =

Moldovan professional footballer

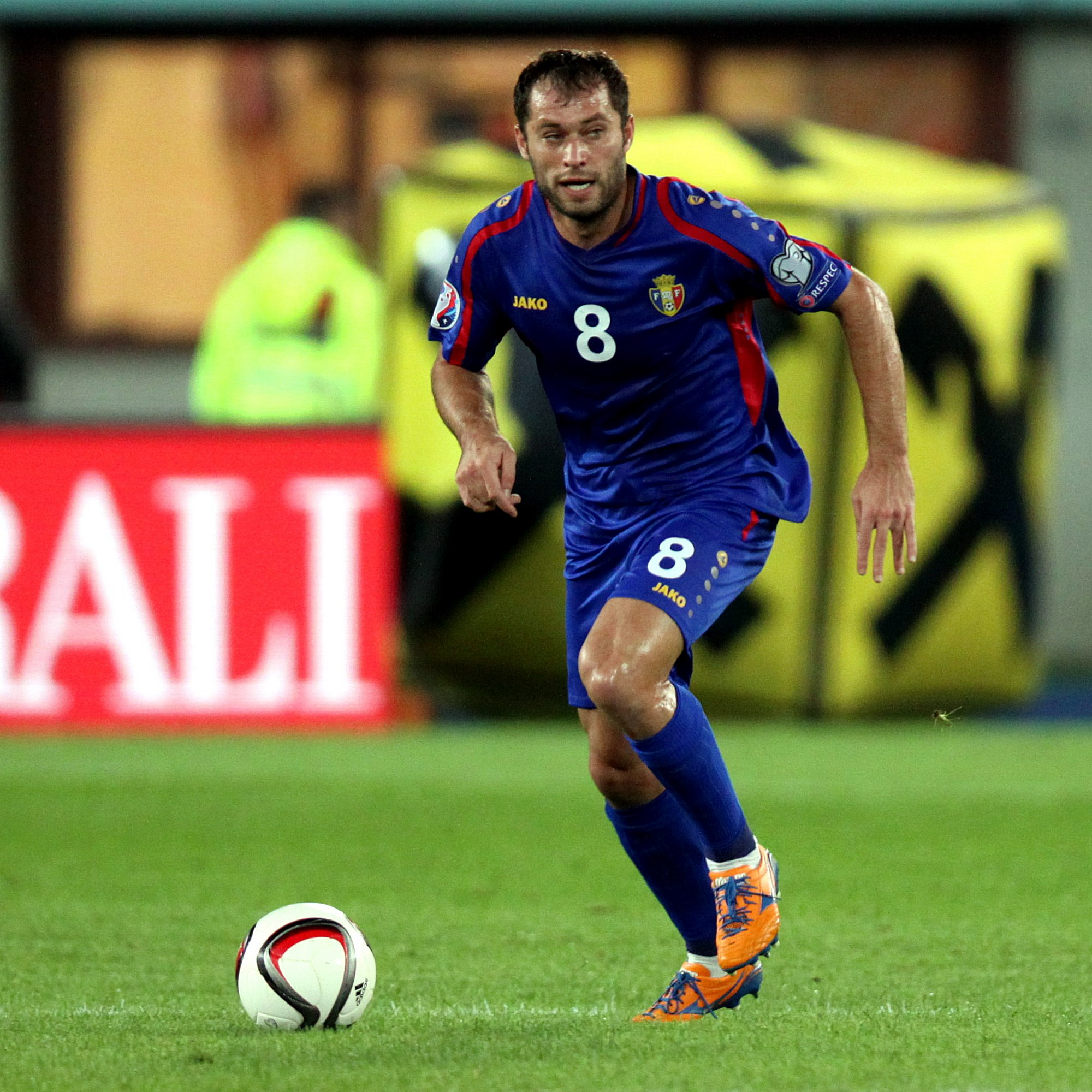
- Cebotaru with Moldova in 2015

Personal information
- Date of birth: 16 October 1984 (age 42)
- Place of birth: Chișinău, Moldavian SSR, Soviet Union
- Height: 1.82 m (6 ft 0 in)
- Position: Midfielder

Team information
- Current team: Universitatea Cluj (assistant)

Youth career
- 1991–2003: Zimbru Chișinău

Senior career*
Years	Team	Apps	(Gls)
2003–2006	Zimbru Chișinău	63	(10)
2007–2011	Ceahlăul Piatra Neamț	138	(34)
2012–2014	Spartak Nalchik	34	(3)
2014–2019	Sibir Novosibirsk	167	(25)
2019–2021	Academica Clinceni	64	(7)
2021–2022	Petrolul Ploiești	44	(4)
Total		510	(83)

International career
2007–2020	Moldova	68	(1)

Managerial career
- 2023–2024: Petrolul Ploiești (assistant)
- 2024: Voluntari (assistant)
- 2024–: Universitatea Cluj (assistant)
- * Club domestic league appearances and goals

Eugeniu Cebotaru (born 16 October 1984) is a Moldovan professional football coach and a former player, currently assistant coach at Liga I club Universitatea Cluj.

== Career statistics ==
=== International ===
Appearances and goals by national team and year
National team	Year	Apps	Goals
Moldova	2007	1	0
Moldova	2008	4	0
Moldova	2009	7	0
Moldova	2010	7	0
Moldova	2011	10	0
Moldova	2012	3	0
Moldova	2013	1	0
Moldova	2014	7	0
Moldova	2015	4	1
Moldova	2016	5	0
Moldova	2017	5	0
Moldova	2018	3	0
Moldova	2019	8	0
Moldova	2020	3	0
Total		68	1

=== International goals ===
Scores and results list Moldova's goal tally first.

No	Date	Venue	Opponent	Score	Result	Competition
1.	9 October 2015	Zimbru Stadium, Chișinău, Moldova	Russia	1–2	1–2	UEFA Euro 2016 qualification

== Honours ==
Zimbru Chișinău

- Moldovan Cup: 2003–04

Ceahlăul Piatra Neamț

- Liga II: 2008–09, 2010–11

Petrolul Ploiești

- Liga II: 2021–22
