= Tome Pachovski =

Macedonian footballer (born 1982)

Personal information
- Full name: Tomislav Pachovski
- Date of birth: 28 June 1982 (age 44)
- Place of birth: Bitola, SR Macedonia, SFR Yugoslavia
- Height: 1.86 m (6 ft 1 in)
- Position: Goalkeeper

Youth career
- Pelister

Senior career*
Years	Team	Apps	(Gls)
1999–2003	Pelister	62	(0)
2004	Ionikos	1	(0)
2005–2008	Rabotnički	58	(0)
2008–2009	Vardar	27	(1)
2009–2012	Beerschot	52	(0)
2012–2014	Mechelen	40	(0)
2015–2017	Vardar	38	(0)
Total		278	(1)

International career
2006–2015	Macedonia	46	(0)
- * Club domestic league appearances and goals

Tomislav Pachovski (Macedonian: Томислав Пачовски; born 28 June 1982) is a Macedonian retired footballer who played as a goalkeeper.

== Club career ==
Pachovski started playing with FK Pelister between 1999 and 2003. He moved to Greek side Ionikos in early 2004, after previously being linked with Serbian side FK Železnik.

Despite interest from other European teams, such as Russian team FC Terek Grozny, in the January 2008 transfer window, he remained in Rabotnički. He was then transferred to FK Vardar in June 2008 and on 24 June 2009, Pacovski signed a two-year contract with Beerschot AC.

After three seasons with Beerschot, Pachovski signed a 3-year contract to continue his career with fellow Belgian side KV Mechelen. In December 2014 he signed with FK Vardar.

== International career ==
He made his senior debut for Macedonia in a June 2006 friendly match against Turkey and has earned a total of 46 caps, scoring no goals. His final international was an October 2015 European Championship qualification match against Ukraine.

== Trophies ==
Three national titles (two with Rabotnicki and one with Vardar)

Three national titles (two with Rabotnicki and one with Pelister)

== Records ==
- 48 caps for Macedonian national team
- 10 matches as captain of national team
- National record: 798 minutes unbeaten
- National record: Season 2008/09 (33 matches – conceded 11 goals)
- 2007/08 – Best goalkeeper in Macedonian first league
- 2008/09 – Best player in Macedonian first league

Sporting positions
Preceded by Goran Pandev	Macedonia captain 2014–2015	Succeeded by Goran Pandev
