= Nestoras Mytidis =

Cypriot footballer

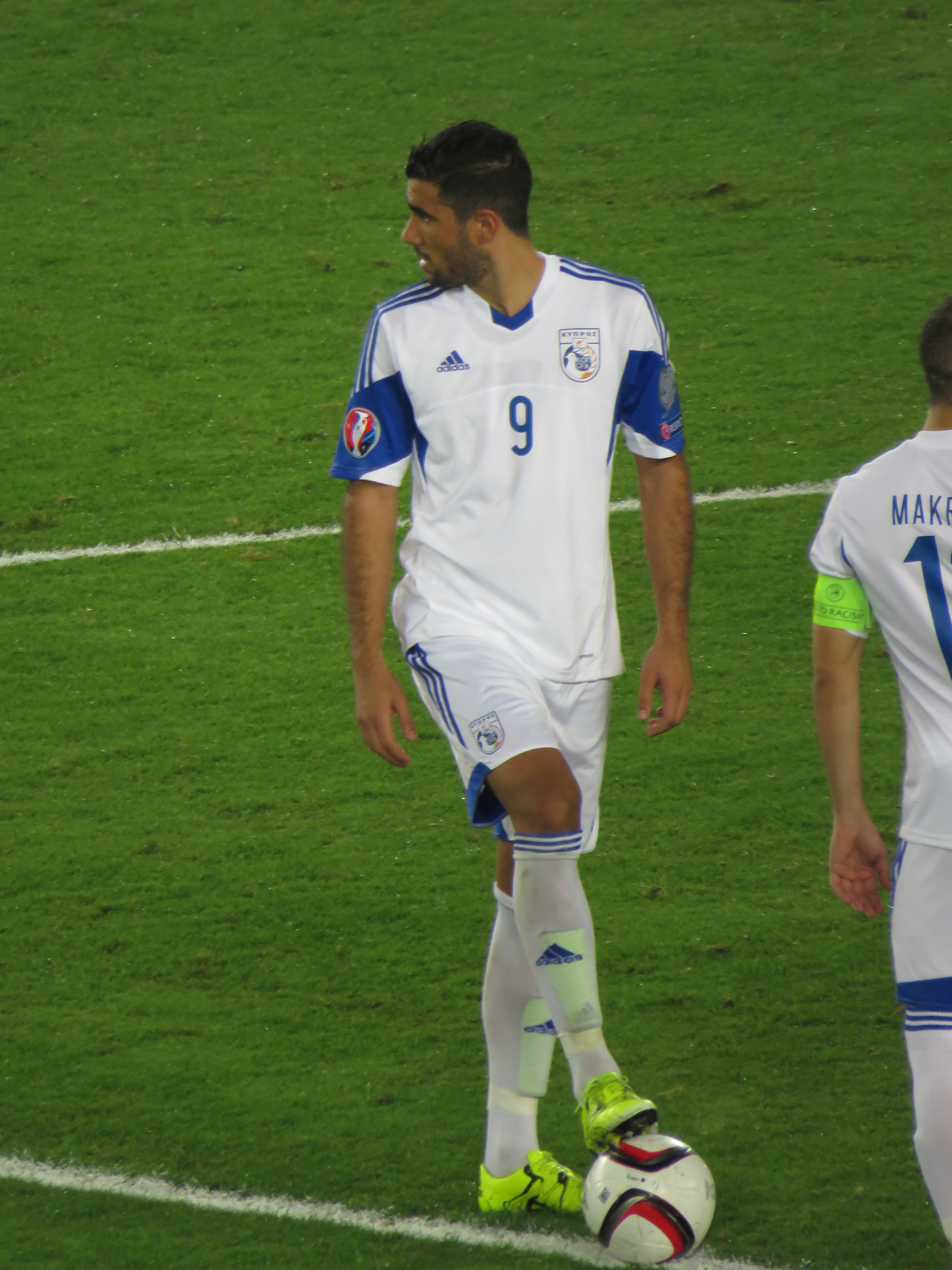

Personal information
- Full name: Nestor Mytidis
- Date of birth: 1 June 1991 (age 35)
- Place of birth: Larnaca, Cyprus
- Height: 1.85 m (6 ft 1 in)
- Position: Striker

Team information
- Current team: AEZ Zakakiou
- Number: 99

Youth career
- AEK Larnaca

Senior career*
Years	Team	Apps	(Gls)
2009–2016	AEK Larnaca	105	(26)
2016–2017	Roda JC Kerkrade	16	(1)
2017	→ AEK Larnaca (loan)	14	(3)
2017–2018	AEK Larnaca	6	(1)
2018	→ Kerkyra (loan)	12	(1)
2018–2019	AEL Limassol	19	(2)
2020	Panachaiki	10	(6)
2020–2022	Levadiakos	41	(14)
2022–2023	Panachaiki	19	(2)
2023–2024	Olympiakos Nicosia	20	(2)
2024–	AEZ Zakakiou	22	(6)

International career^{‡}
2010–2018	Cyprus	32	(5)
- * Club domestic league appearances and goals as of 26 June 2025 ‡ National team caps and goals as of 19 November 2019

Nestoras Mytidis (Greek: Νέστορας Μυτίδης; born 1 June 1991) is a Cypriot professional footballer who plays as a striker for Cypriot club AEZ Zakakiou.

== Club career ==
Mytidis began playing football at a young age and after the arrival of Andreas Michaelides, he progressed to the first team, that was playing at Cyprus Second Division during the 2009–10 season, and had two appearances, helping the team promote back to First Division.

In the 2010–11 season, Ton Caanen established Mitidis as a regular first team player, and on 13 November 2010, he scored his first senior goal of his career, in the 85th minute of a win against Ermis Aradippou.

He scored his first goal for the Europa League in an 8–0 victory for AEK Larnaca against Floriana in Hibernians Ground.

On 12 July 2016, Mytidis signed a two-year contract with option for another one with the Dutch club, Roda JC Kerkrade.

In April 2017, Mytidis permanently returned to AEK Larnaca following a six-month loan.

On 18 December 2017, Mytidis signed a six months contract with Super League club Kerkyra on loan from AEK Larnaca.

== International career ==
Mytidis outstanding performances caught the eye of Angelos Anastasiadis who called him to the Cyprus national football team when he was only 19 years old. On 16 November 2010, he debuted for Cyprus, playing in a friendly match against Jordan as substitution on 64th minute.

#	Date	Venue	Opponent	Score	Result	Competition
1.	13 June 2015	Estadi Nacional, Andorra la Vella	Andorra	1–1	1–3	UEFA Euro 2016 qualifying
2.	13 June 2015	Estadi Nacional, Andorra la Vella	Andorra	1–2	1–3	UEFA Euro 2016 qualifying
3.	13 June 2015	Estadi Nacional, Andorra la Vella	Andorra	1–3	1–3	UEFA Euro 2016 qualifying
4.	13 October 2015	GSP Stadium, Nicosia	Bosnia and Herzegovina	2–1	2–3	UEFA Euro 2016 qualifying
5.	22 March 2017	GSP Stadium, Nicosia	Kazakhstan	1–1	3–1	Friendly

== Honours ==
Levadiakos

- Super League 2: 2021–22
