= UEFA Euro 2016 qualifying play-offs =

Football tournament qualifying stage

The play-offs of the UEFA Euro 2016 qualifying tournament decided the final four teams which qualified for the UEFA Euro 2016 final tournament. Eight teams, each of which finished third in their qualifying group were paired and contested in four ties, with the winner of each pair qualifying for the final tournament. Each of the four ties were played over two home-and-away legs with the four winners found according to the standard rules for the knockout phase in European competitions. The matches took place between 12 and 17 November 2015.

== Ranking of third-placed teams ==
The highest ranked third placed team from the groups qualified automatically for the tournament, while the remainder entered the playoffs. As most groups contained six teams but one contained five, matches against the sixth-placed team in each group were not included in this ranking. As a result, a total of eight matches played by each team were counted in the third-placed ranking table.

Pos	Grp	Team	Pld	W	D	L	GF	GA	GD	Pts	Qualification
1	A	Turkey	8	5	1	2	12	7	+5	16	Qualify for final tournament
2	F	Hungary	8	4	3	1	8	5	+3	15	Advance to play-offs
3	C	Ukraine	8	4	1	3	11	4	+7	13	Advance to play-offs
4	H	Norway	8	4	1	3	8	10	−2	13	Advance to play-offs
5	I	Denmark	8	3	3	2	8	5	+3	12	Advance to play-offs
6	G	Sweden	8	3	3	2	11	9	+2	12	Advance to play-offs
7	D	Republic of Ireland	8	3	3	2	8	7	+1	12	Advance to play-offs
8	B	Bosnia and Herzegovina	8	3	2	3	11	12	−1	11	Advance to play-offs
9	E	Slovenia	8	3	1	4	10	11	−1	10	Advance to play-offs

Source: UEFA
Rules for classification: Counting only matches against teams ranked first to fifth in the group, 1) Points; 2) Goal difference; 3) Goals scored; 4) Away goals scored; 5) Lower disciplinary points total; 6) UEFA national team coefficient ranking; 7) Drawing of lots.

== Seeding ==
The draw for the play-offs was held on 18 October 2015, 11:20 CEST, at the UEFA headquarters in Nyon. The teams were seeded for the play-off draw according to the UEFA national team coefficient rankings updated after the completion of the qualifying group stage. The four top-ranked teams were seeded and paired with the four unseeded teams. The order of legs of each tie was also decided by draw. The seedings were as follows:

Pot 1 (seeded)
Team	Coeff	Rank
Bosnia and Herzegovina	30,367	13
Ukraine	30,313	14
Sweden	29,028	16
Hungary	27,142	20

Pot 2 (unseeded)
Team	Coeff	Rank
Denmark	27,140	21
Republic of Ireland	26,902	23
Norway	26,439	25
Slovenia	25,441	26

== Summary ==
The schedule of the play-offs was published by UEFA within one hour of the draw. The eight matches were spread over the six days, with the first legs on 12–14 November and the second legs on 15–17 November. The kickoff times were 18:00 or 20:45 CET (local times are in parentheses).

Team 1	Agg.	Team 2	1st leg	2nd leg
Ukraine	3–1	Slovenia	2–0	1–1
Sweden	4–3	Denmark	2–1	2–2
Bosnia and Herzegovina	1–3	Republic of Ireland	1–1	0–2
Norway	1–3	Hungary	0–1	1–2

== Matches ==
14 November 2015
18:00
(19:00 UTC+2)

Ukraine	2–0	Slovenia
Yarmolenko 22'; Seleznyov 54'	Report

Arena Lviv, Lviv
Attendance: 32,592
Referee: Jonas Eriksson (Sweden)
17 November 2015
20:45
(20:45 UTC+1)

Slovenia	1–1	Ukraine
Cesar 11'	Report	Yarmolenko 90+7'

Ljudski vrt, Maribor
Attendance: 12,702
Referee: Cüneyt Çakır (Turkey)

Ukraine won 3–1 on aggregate and qualified for UEFA Euro 2016.

14 November 2015
20:45
(20:45 UTC+1)

Sweden	2–1	Denmark
Forsberg 45'; Ibrahimović 50' (pen.)	Report	Jørgensen 80'

Friends Arena, Solna
Attendance: 49,053
Referee: Nicola Rizzoli (Italy)
17 November 2015
20:45
(20:45 UTC+1)

Denmark	2–2	Sweden
Y. Poulsen 82'; Vestergaard 90+1'	Report	Ibrahimović 19', 76'

Telia Parken, Copenhagen
Attendance: 36,051
Referee: Martin Atkinson (England)

Sweden won 4–3 on aggregate and qualified for UEFA Euro 2016.

13 November 2015
20:45
(20:45 UTC+1)

Bosnia and Herzegovina	1–1	Republic of Ireland
Džeko 85'	Report	Brady 82'

Bilino Polje, Zenica
Attendance: 12,000
Referee: Felix Brych (Germany)
16 November 2015
20:45
(19:45 UTC±0)

Republic of Ireland	2–0	Bosnia and Herzegovina
Walters 24' (pen.), 70'	Report

Aviva Stadium, Dublin
Attendance: 50,500
Referee: Björn Kuipers (Netherlands)

Republic of Ireland won 3–1 on aggregate and qualified for UEFA Euro 2016.

12 November 2015
20:45
(20:45 UTC+1)

Norway	0–1	Hungary
	Report	Kleinheisler 26'

Ullevaal Stadion, Oslo
Attendance: 27,182
Referee: Mark Clattenburg (England)
15 November 2015
20:45
(20:45 UTC+1)

Hungary	2–1	Norway
Priskin 14'; Henriksen 83' (o.g.)	Report	Henriksen 87'

Groupama Arena, Budapest
Attendance: 22,189
Referee: Carlos Velasco Carballo (Spain)

Hungary won 3–1 on aggregate and qualified for UEFA Euro 2016.

== Goalscorers ==
There were 19 goals scored in 8 matches, for an average of 2.38 goals per match.

3 goals

- (Sweden men's national football team) Zlatan Ibrahimović

2 goals

- (Republic of Ireland national football team) Jonathan Walters
- (Ukraine national football team) Andriy Yarmolenko

1 goal

- (Bosnia and Herzegovina national football team) Edin Džeko
- (Denmark national football team) Nicolai Jørgensen
- (Denmark national football team) Yussuf Poulsen
- (Denmark national football team) Jannik Vestergaard
- (Hungary national football team) László Kleinheisler
- (Hungary national football team) Tamás Priskin
- (Norway national football team) Markus Henriksen
- (Republic of Ireland national football team) Robbie Brady
- (Slovenia national football team) Boštjan Cesar
- (Sweden men's national football team) Emil Forsberg
- (Ukraine national football team) Yevhen Seleznyov

1 own goal

- (Norway national football team) Markus Henriksen (against Hungary)

== Discipline ==
A player was automatically suspended for the next match for the following offences:

- Receiving a red card (red card suspensions could be extended for serious offences)
- Receiving three yellow cards in three different matches, as well as after fifth and any subsequent yellow card (yellow card suspensions were carried forward to the play-offs, but not the finals or any other future international matches)

The following suspensions were served during the play-off matches:

Team	Player	Offence(s)	Suspended for match(es)
Bosnia and Herzegovina	Muhamed Bešić	(red card) vs Andorra (6 September 2015)	vs Republic of Ireland (13 November 2015)
Hungary	Roland Juhász	(yellow card) vs Romania (11 October 2014); (yellow card) vs Finland (13 June 2015); (yellow card) vs Greece (11 October 2015)	vs Norway (12 November 2015)
Hungary	Zoltán Gera	(yellow card) vs Romania (11 October 2014); (yellow card) vs Faroe Islands (14 October 2014); (yellow card) vs Finland (13 June 2015); (yellow card) vs Faroe Islands (8 October 2015); (yellow card) vs Norway (12 November 2015)	vs Norway (15 November 2015)
Republic of Ireland	John O'Shea	(yellow card) (yellow-red card) vs Poland (11 October 2015)	vs Bosnia and Herzegovina (13 November 2015)
Republic of Ireland	Jonathan Walters	(yellow card) vs Georgia (7 September 2014); (yellow card) vs Gibraltar (4 September 2015); (yellow card) vs Poland (11 October 2015)	vs Bosnia and Herzegovina (13 November 2015)
Ukraine	Oleksandr Kucher	(yellow card) vs Belarus (9 October 2014); (yellow card) vs Spain (27 March 2015); (yellow card) vs Spain (12 October 2015)	vs Slovenia (14 November 2015)
Ukraine	Taras Stepanenko	(yellow card) vs Slovakia (8 September 2014); (yellow card) vs Slovakia (8 September 2015); (yellow card) vs Spain (12 October 2015)	vs Slovenia (14 November 2015)

== See also ==
- Denmark–Sweden football rivalry
