= Martin Büchel =

Liechtenstein footballer

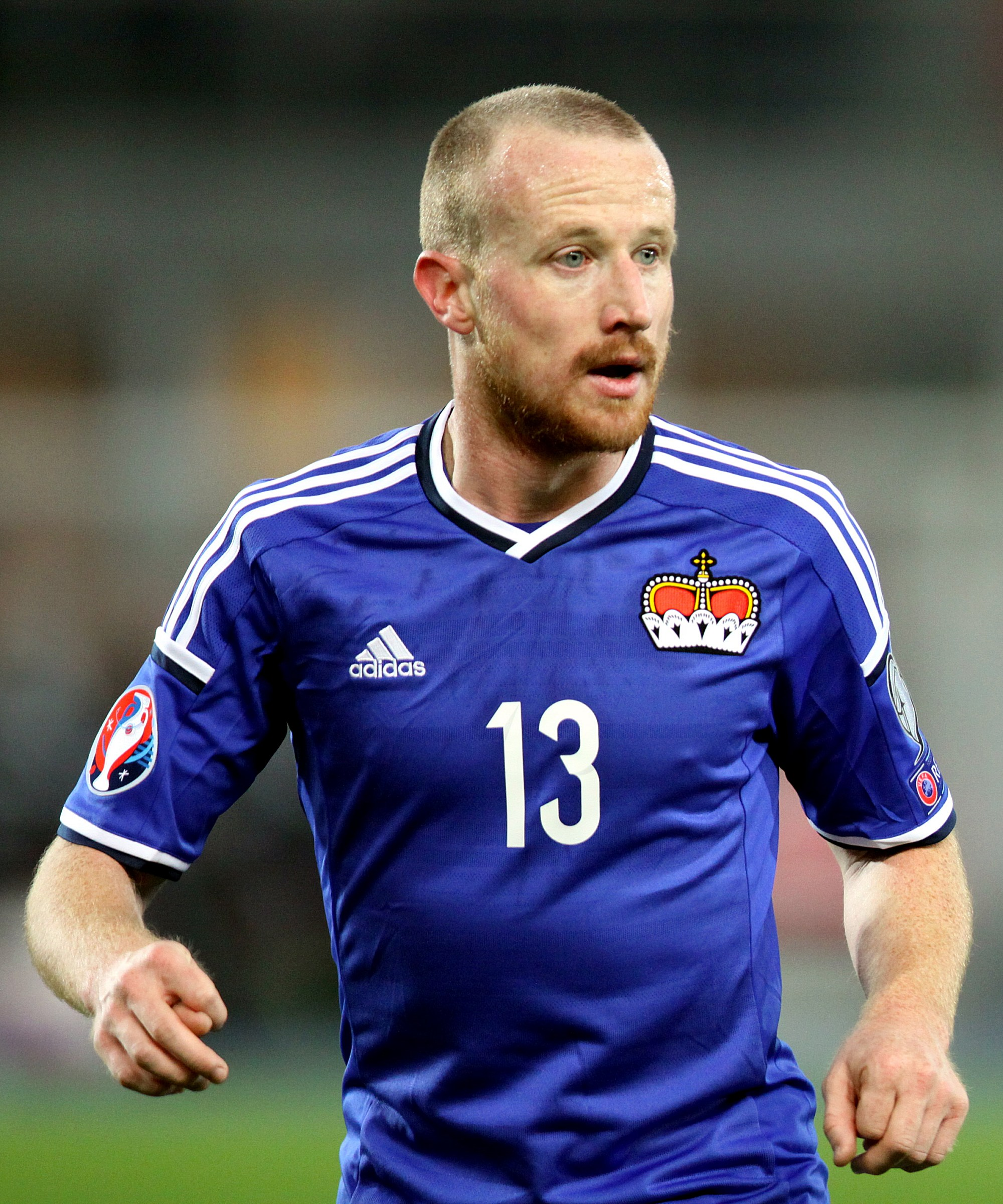
- Büchel playing for Liechtenstein in 2015

Personal information
- Full name: Martin Büchel
- Date of birth: 19 February 1987 (age 39)
- Place of birth: Ruggell, Liechtenstein
- Height: 1.76 m (5 ft 9 in)
- Position: Midfielder

Youth career
- 1996–2005: FC Ruggell

Senior career*
Years	Team	Apps	(Gls)
2005–2006	FC Vaduz	0	(0)
2006–2012	FC Zürich	33	(2)
2010	→ FC Vaduz (loan)	9	(0)
2011	→ Deportivo B (loan)	12	(1)
2012–2018	FC Unterföhring	122	(5)
2018–2019	FC Zürich II	6	(0)
2019–2021	FC Red Star Zürich	16	(0)
2021–2022	FC Ruggell	0	(0)

International career^{‡}
2004–2021	Liechtenstein	91	(2)
- * Club domestic league appearances and goals as of 26 June 2023 ‡ National team caps and goals as of 14 November 2021

Martin Büchel (born 19 February 1987 in Ruggell) is a retired Liechtenstein footballer, who last played for FC Ruggell in Liechtenstein and formerly played for the Liechtenstein national football team.

== Career ==
Büchel began his career in his hometown for FC Ruggell and signed after nine years in the youth side with his club for local rival FC Vaduz. His talents as a youngster earned him a transfer in 2006 to Swiss Super League side FC Zürich, who were then champions of Switzerland. On 12 January 2010 left Büchel his Swiss club FC Zürich and turned on loan back to his former club FC Vaduz. Following a loan spell at Deportivo de La Coruña in Spain, Büchel joined German side FC Unterföhring in 2012.

Büchel re-joined FC Zurich in 2018 as an osteopath while also continuing his playing career with their reserve side.

In July 2019, Büchel moved on to another Zürich side, FC Red Star.

== International career ==
He was one of Liechtenstein's biggest young football talents and made his international debut at the age of 17. He announced his retirement from international football on 4 November 2021, being effective after the last matches of that year.

=== International goals ===
Scores and results list Liechtenstein's goal tally first.

Goal	Date	Venue	Opponent	Score	Result	Competition
1.	29 February 2012	Ta' Qali National Stadium, Mdina, Malta	Malta	1–0	1–2	Friendly
2.	7 June 2013	Rheinpark Stadion, Vaduz, Liechtenstein	Slovakia	1–0	1–1	2014 FIFA World Cup qualification
