= List of Montenegro national football team captains =

This is a list of all the players who have captained the Montenegro national football team.

Mirko Vučinić was the first captain of the Montenegro national football team since its establishment in 2007.

Stevan Jovetić wore the captain band the most times: 53.

Also Stevan Jovetić is the current captain of the national team.

== List of captains ==
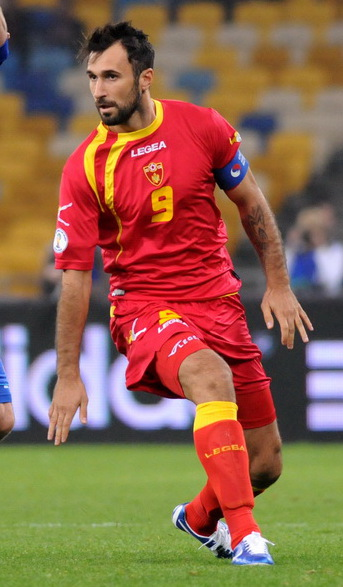
Mirko Vučinić is the first captain in the history of the Montenegro.

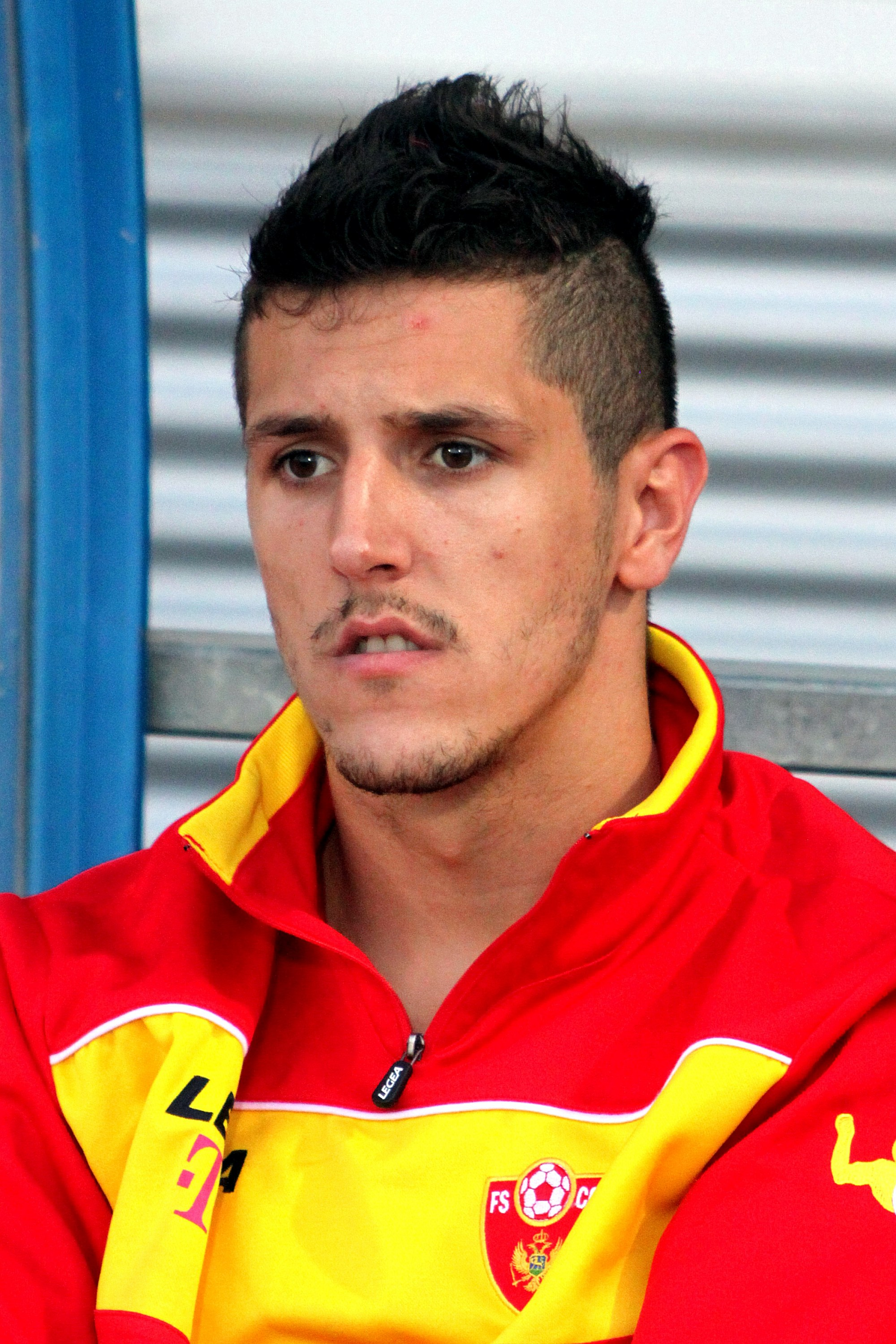
Stevan Jovetić is a current captain of the Montenegro national team and a player with the most captaincies with 53 matches.

List of captaincy periods of the various captains throughout the years.

As of 5 June 2026, after the game against Slovakia

Players in bold are still active. Years in italics indicate last year, when still an active player was a captain.

#	Name	Captain	Appearances	Goals	National years	Captaincy years
1	**Stevan Jovetić**	53	91	37	2007–	2012–2025
2	Mirko Vučinić	36	46	17	2007–2017	2007–2015
3	**Stefan Savić**	20	78	9	2010–	2015–2026
4	Fatos Bećiraj	15	86	15	2009–2022	2016–2022
5	Branko Bošković	9	29	1	2007–2014	2008–2014
6	Vukašin Poleksić	6	38	0	2007–2016	2009–2016
7	Nikola Vukčević	4	51	1	2014–2022	2019
7	Žarko Tomašević	4	64	5	2010–2023	2022
7	**Adam Marušić**	4	70	5	2015–	2024–2026
10	Marko Simić	3	50	2	2013–2021	2018–2021
10	**Stefan Mugoša**	3	65	16	2015–	2024–2026
12	Igor Burzanović	2	8	2	2007–2008	2007
12	**Danijel Petković**	2	29	0	2014–	2020–2025
14	Radomir Đalović	1	26	7	2007–2011	2011
14	Nikola Drinčić	1	33	3	2007–2014	2011
14	Milorad Peković	1	34	0	2007–2013	2010
14	Milan Jovanović	1	36	0	2007–2014	2011
14	**Marko Bakić**	1	37	0	2012–	2025–2025
14	Simon Vukčević	1	45	2	2007–2014	2012
14	**Igor Vujačić**	1	46	0	2019–	2026–2026
Total	20 players	168			2007–2026	2007–2026
