= 2016–17 in Armenian football =

Football in Armenia
- Season: 2016–17

Men's football
- Premier League: Alashkert
- First League: Banants II
- Cup: Shirak
- Supercup: Alashkert

The following article is a summary of the 2016–17 football season in Armenia, which is the 25th season of competitive football in the country and runs from August 2016 to May 2017.

== League tables ==
=== Armenian Premier League ===
Pos	Team	Pld	W	D	L	GF	GA	GD	Pts	Qualification
1	Alashkert (C)	30	19	7	4	59	26	+33	64	Qualification for the Champions League first qualifying round
2	Gandzasar Kapan	30	17	6	7	38	24	+14	57	Qualification for the Europa League first qualifying round (Note: Shirak qualified for Europa League first qualifying round by winning the 2016–17 Armenian Cup. However, since they already qualified for European competition based on their league position, the spot awarded to the cup winners was passed down the league.)
3	Shirak	30	16	5	9	31	24	+7	53	Qualification for the Europa League first qualifying round
4	Pyunik	30	12	9	9	35	27	+8	45	Qualification for the Europa League first qualifying round
5	Banants	30	5	6	19	18	44	−26	21	
6	Ararat Yerevan	30	3	3	24	17	53	−36	12	

Source: Football Federation of Armenia (in Armenian), Soccerway
Rules for classification: 1) Points; 2) Play-off (only if deciding champion); 3) Matches won; 4) Head-to-head points; 5) Head-to-head matches won; 6) Head-to-head goal difference; 7) Head-to-head goals scored; 8) Head-to-head away goals scored; 9) Goal difference; 10) Goals scored.
(C) Champions

=== Armenian First League ===
Pos	Team	Pld	W	D	L	GF	GA	GD	Pts	Promotion, qualification or relegation
1	Banants II (C)	24	17	4	3	63	23	+40	55	Ineligible for promotion to the 2017–18 Armenian Premier League
2	Pyunik II	24	14	5	5	65	28	+37	47	
3	Ararat II	24	11	9	4	36	20	+16	42	
4	Gandzasar II	24	11	5	8	33	37	−4	38	
5	Alashkert II	24	5	7	12	25	40	−15	22	
6	Shirak II	24	6	3	15	23	46	−23	21	
7	Erebuni	24	2	3	19	20	71	−51	9	Club declined promotion
8	Kotayk	0	0	0	0	0	0	0	0	Club withdrew after round 7, results expunged

Source: soccerway.com
Rules for classification: 1) Points; 2) Play-off (only if deciding champion); 3) Matches won; 4) Head-to-head points; 5) Head-to-head matches won; 6) Head-to-head goal difference; 7) Head-to-head goals scored; 8) Head-to-head away goals scored; 9) Goal difference; 10) Goals scored.
(C) Champions

== Armenian Cup ==
=== Final ===
24 May 2017
19:00

Shirak	3 – 0	Pyunik
Nwabueze 6', 38'; Bichakhchyan 28'	Report

Vazgen Sargsyan Republican Stadium, Yerevan
Attendance: 2,000
Referee: Zaven Hovhannisyan

== National team ==
=== 2018 FIFA World Cup qualifiers ===
Pos	Team	Pld	W	D	L	GF	GA	GD	Pts	Qualification	Poland	Denmark	Montenegro	Romania	Armenia	Kazakhstan
1	Poland	10	8	1	1	28	14	+14	25	Qualification to 2018 FIFA World Cup	—	3–2	4–2	3–1	2–1	3–0
2	Denmark	10	6	2	2	20	8	+12	20	Advance to second round	4–0	—	0–1	1–1	1–0	4–1
3	Montenegro	10	5	1	4	20	12	+8	16		1–2	0–1	—	1–0	4–1	5–0
4	Romania	10	3	4	3	12	10	+2	13		0–3	0–0	1–1	—	1–0	3–1
5	Armenia	10	2	1	7	10	26	−16	7		1–6	1–4	3–2	0–5	—	2–0
6	Kazakhstan	10	0	3	7	6	26	−20	3		2–2	1–3	0–3	0–0	1–1	—

Source: FIFA
Rules for classification: Qualification tiebreakers

4 September 2016 2018 FIFA World Cup Q	Denmark	1–0	Armenia	Copenhagen, Denmark
18:00 UTC+2	Eriksen 17'	Report (FIFA); Report (UEFA)		Stadium: Parken Stadium; Attendance: 21,745; Referee: Harald Lechner (Austria)

8 October 2016 2018 FIFA World Cup Q	Armenia	0–5	Romania	Yerevan, Armenia
20:00 UTC+4		Report (FIFA); Report (UEFA)	Stancu 4' (pen.); Popa 10'; Marin 12'; Stanciu 29'; Chipciu 60'	Stadium: Vazgen Sargsyan Republican Stadium; Attendance: 5,500; Referee: Vladislav Bezborodov (Russia)

11 October 2016 2018 FIFA World Cup Q	Poland	2–1	Armenia	Warsaw, Poland
20:45 UTC+2	Mkoyan 48' (o.g.); Lewandowski 90+5'	Report (FIFA); Report (UEFA)	Pizzelli 50'	Stadium: Stadion Narodowy; Attendance: 44,786; Referee: Ivan Kružliak (Slovakia)

11 November 2016 2018 FIFA World Cup Q	Armenia	3–2	Montenegro	Yerevan, Armenia
21:00 UTC+4	A. Grigoryan 50'; Haroyan 74'; Ghazaryan 90+3'	Report (FIFA); Report (UEFA)	Kojašević 36'; Jovetić 38'	Stadium: Vazgen Sargsyan Republican Stadium; Attendance: 3,500; Referee: Pavel Královec (Czech Republic)

26 March 2017 2018 FIFA World Cup Q	Armenia	2–0	Kazakhstan	Yerevan, Armenia
20:00 UTC+4	Mkhitaryan 73'; Özbiliz 75'	Report (FIFA); Report (UEFA)		Stadium: Vazgen Sargsyan Republican Stadium; Attendance: 11,500; Referee: Aleksandar Stavrev (Macedonia)

10 June 2017 2018 FIFA World Cup Q	Montenegro	4–1	Armenia	Podgorica, Montenegro
20:45 UTC+2	Bećiraj 2'; Jovetić 28', 54', 82'	Report (FIFA); Report (UEFA)	Koryan 89'	Stadium: City Stadium; Attendance: 6,861; Referee: Kevin Blom (Netherlands)
