= 2017–18 in Armenian football =

Football in Armenia
- Season: 2017–18

Men's football
- Premier League: Alashkert
- First League: Lori
- Cup: Gandzasar Kapan
- Supercup: Shirak

The following article is a summary of the 2017–18 football season in Armenia, which is the 26th season of competitive football in the country and runs from August 2017 to May 2018.

== League tables ==
=== Armenian Premier League ===
| Pos | Team | Pld | W | D | L | GF | GA | GD | Pts | Qualification |
|---|---|---|---|---|---|---|---|---|---|---|
| 1 | Alashkert (C) | 30 | 14 | 8 | 8 | 44 | 31 | +13 | 50 | Qualification for the Champions League first qualifying round |
| 2 | Banants | 30 | 11 | 11 | 8 | 42 | 34 | +8 | 44 | Qualification for the Europa League first qualifying round (Note: Gandzasar Kapan qualified for the Europa League first qualifying round by winning the 2017–18 Armenian Cup.) |
| 3 | Gandzasar Kapan | 30 | 11 | 10 | 9 | 43 | 34 | +9 | 43 | Qualification for the Europa League first qualifying round |
| 4 | Shirak | 30 | 14 | 8 | 8 | 37 | 31 | +6 | 38 (Note: Shirak were deducted 12 points on decision of Disciplinary Committee, upheld on May 18, due to match fixing scandal.) | |
| 5 | Pyunik | 30 | 9 | 9 | 12 | 37 | 41 | −4 | 36 | Qualification for the Europa League first qualifying round |
| 6 | Ararat Yerevan | 30 | 5 | 6 | 19 | 33 | 65 | −32 | 21 | |

Source: Soccerway
Rules for classification: 1) Points; 2) Play-off (only if deciding champion); 3) Matches won; 4) Head-to-head points; 5) Head-to-head matches won; 6) Head-to-head goal difference; 7) Head-to-head goals scored; 8) Head-to-head away goals scored; 9) Goal difference; 10) Goals scored.
(C) Champions

=== Armenian First League ===
| Pos | Team | Pld | W | D | L | GF | GA | GD | Pts | Promotion |
|---|---|---|---|---|---|---|---|---|---|---|
| 1 | Lori (C, P) | 27 | 22 | 3 | 2 | 74 | 16 | +58 | 69 | Promotion to the Premier League |
| 2 | Artsakh (P) | 27 | 21 | 2 | 4 | 77 | 16 | +61 | 65 | Promotion to the Premier League |
| 3 | Ararat-Moskva (P) | 27 | 14 | 4 | 9 | 65 | 41 | +24 | 46 | Promotion to the Premier League |
| 4 | Banants-2 | 27 | 14 | 3 | 10 | 45 | 42 | +3 | 45 | Ineligible for promotion |
| 5 | Pyunik-2 | 27 | 13 | 1 | 13 | 49 | 44 | +5 | 40 | Ineligible for promotion |
| 6 | Alashkert-2 | 27 | 12 | 4 | 11 | 48 | 42 | +6 | 40 | Ineligible for promotion |
| 7 | Ararat Yerevan-2 | 27 | 7 | 4 | 16 | 36 | 55 | −19 | 25 | Ineligible for promotion |
| 8 | Erebuni | 27 | 6 | 4 | 17 | 33 | 91 | −58 | 22 | |
| 9 | Gandzasar Kapan-2 | 27 | 6 | 2 | 19 | 31 | 74 | −43 | 20 | Ineligible for promotion |
| 10 | Shirak-2 | 27 | 5 | 3 | 19 | 22 | 59 | −37 | 18 | Ineligible for promotion |

Source: Football Federation of Armenia (in Armenian)
Rules for classification: 1) Points; 2) Play-off (only if deciding champion); 3) Matches won; 4) Head-to-head points; 5) Head-to-head matches won; 6) Head-to-head goal difference; 7) Head-to-head goals scored; 8) Head-to-head away goals scored; 9) Goal difference; 10) Goals scored.
(C) Champions; (P) Promoted

== Armenian Cup ==
=== Final ===
16 May 2018
19:00

| Gandzasar Kapan | 1 – 1 (a.e.t.) | Pyunik |
|---|---|---|
| Musonda 116' | Report | M.Manasyan 106' |
Penalties
| Ishkhanyan (penalty missed); Christian (penalty scored); A.Khachatryan (penalty scored); Musonda (penalty scored); Harutyunyan (penalty scored) | 4 – 3 | (penalty scored) Nenadović; (penalty scored) Arta.Yedigaryan; (penalty scored) Daghbashyan; (penalty missed) Manoyan; (penalty missed) T.Voskanyan |

Vazgen Sargsyan Republican Stadium, Yerevan
Attendance: 1,000
Referee: Artur Simonyan

== National team ==
=== 2018 FIFA World Cup qualifiers ===
| Pos | Team | Pld | W | D | L | GF | GA | GD | Pts | Qualification | Poland | Denmark | Montenegro | Romania | Armenia | Kazakhstan |
|---|---|---|---|---|---|---|---|---|---|---|---|---|---|---|---|---|
| 1 | Poland | 10 | 8 | 1 | 1 | 28 | 14 | +14 | 25 | Qualification to 2018 FIFA World Cup | — | 3–2 | 4–2 | 3–1 | 2–1 | 3–0 |
| 2 | Denmark | 10 | 6 | 2 | 2 | 20 | 8 | +12 | 20 | Advance to second round | 4–0 | — | 0–1 | 1–1 | 1–0 | 4–1 |
| 3 | Montenegro | 10 | 5 | 1 | 4 | 20 | 12 | +8 | 16 | | 1–2 | 0–1 | — | 1–0 | 4–1 | 5–0 |
| 4 | Romania | 10 | 3 | 4 | 3 | 12 | 10 | +2 | 13 | | 0–3 | 0–0 | 1–1 | — | 1–0 | 3–1 |
| 5 | Armenia | 10 | 2 | 1 | 7 | 10 | 26 | −16 | 7 | | 1–6 | 1–4 | 3–2 | 0–5 | — | 2–0 |
| 6 | Kazakhstan | 10 | 0 | 3 | 7 | 6 | 26 | −20 | 3 | | 2–2 | 1–3 | 0–3 | 0–0 | 1–1 | — |

Source: FIFA
Rules for classification: Qualification tiebreakers

| 1 September 2017 2018 FIFA World Cup Q | Romania | 1–0 | Armenia | Bucharest, Romania |
| 21:45 UTC+3 | Maxim 90+1' | Report (FIFA); Report (UEFA) | | Stadium: Arena Națională; Attendance: 27,178; Referee: Ivan Bebek (Croatia) |

| 4 September 2017 2018 FIFA World Cup Q | Armenia | 1–4 | Denmark | Yerevan, Armenia |
| 20:00 UTC+4 | Koryan 6' | Report (FIFA); Report (UEFA) | Delaney 16', 81', 90+3'; Eriksen 29' | Stadium: Vazgen Sargsyan Republican Stadium; Attendance: 6,800; Referee: Bobby Madden (Scotland) |

| 5 October 2017 2018 FIFA World Cup Q | Armenia | 1–6 | Poland | Yerevan, Armenia |
| 20:00 UTC+4 | Hambardzumyan 39' | Report (FIFA); Report (UEFA) | Grosicki 2'; Lewandowski 18', 25', 64'; Błaszczykowski 58'; Wolski 89' | Stadium: Vazgen Sargsyan Republican Stadium; Attendance: 5,478; Referee: Matej Jug (Slovenia) |

| 8 October 2017 2018 FIFA World Cup Q | Kazakhstan | 1–1 | Armenia | Astana, Kazakhstan |
| 22:00 UTC+6 | Turysbek 62' | Report (FIFA); Report (UEFA) | Mkhitaryan 26' | Stadium: Astana Arena; Attendance: 12,158; Referee: Alexandru Tean (Moldova) |
