= 2006 UEFA European Under-21 Championship qualification play-offs =

2006 UEFA European Under-21 Championship qualification

The play-off round of 2006 UEFA European Under-21 Championship qualification was held on 11–13 and 15–16 November 2005. Winners of play-off round qualified to the championship played following year in May and June, where Portugal was chosen to host the fixtures.

== Matches ==
| Team 1 | Agg. | Team 2 | 1st leg | 2nd leg |
|---|---|---|---|---|
| England | 2–3 | France | 1–1 | 1–2 |
| Czech Republic | 0–3 | Germany | 0–2 | 0–1 |
| Hungary | 1–2 | Italy | 1–1 | 0–1 |
| Serbia and Montenegro | 5–2 | Croatia | 3–1 | 2–1 |
| Ukraine | 5–4 | Belgium | 2–3 | 3–1 |
| Russia | 1–4 | Denmark | 0–1 | 1–3 |
| Switzerland | 2–3 | Portugal | 1–1 | 1–2 |
| Slovenia | 0–2 | Netherlands | 0–0 | 0–2 |

== First leg ==
11 November 2005
20:00

| Czech Republic | 0 – 2 | Germany |
|---|---|---|
| | Report | Rafael 35'; Schulz 86' |

Městský fotbalový stadion, Uherské Hradiště
Attendance: 8,125
Referee: Zsolt Szabó (Hungary)

11 November 2005
20:30

| England | 1 – 1 | France |
|---|---|---|
| Ambrose 88' | Report | Le Tallec 55' |

White Hart Lane, London
Attendance: 34,579
Referee: Jonas Eriksson (Sweden)

11 November 2005
20:30

| Hungary | 1 – 1 | Italy |
|---|---|---|
| Huszti 73' | Report | Donadel 57' |

Üllői úti stadion, Budapest
Attendance: 16,000
Referee: Serge Gumienny (Belgium)

12 November 2005
17:00

| Russia | 0 – 1 | Denmark |
|---|---|---|
| | Report | Lorentzen 60' |

Kuban Stadium, Krasnodar
Attendance: 20,000
Referee: Anton Genov (Bulgaria)

12 November 2005
17:00

| Ukraine | 2 – 3 | Belgium |
|---|---|---|
| Pukanych 27'; Aliyev 49' | Report | Vandenbergh 19', 45+1', 59' |

Illichivets Stadium, Mariupol
Attendance: 12,636
Referee: Athanassios Briakos (Greece)

12 November 2005
20:00

| Serbia and Montenegro | 3 – 1 | Croatia |
|---|---|---|
| Vučinić 3', 51', 69' | Report | Eduardo 25' |

Stadion FK Crvena Zvezda, Belgrade
Attendance: 25,302
Referee: Fritz Stuchlik (Austria)

13 November 2005
14:30

| Switzerland | 1 – 1 | Portugal |
|---|---|---|
| Chiumiento 3' | Report | Quaresma 17' |

Hardturm, Zürich
Attendance: 12,500
Referee: Jacek Granat (Poland)

13 November 2005
18:45

| Slovenia | 0 – 0 | Netherlands |
|---|---|---|
| | Report |

Arena Petrol, Celje
Attendance: 4,500
Referee: Romans Lajuks (Latvia)

== Second leg ==
15 November 2005
18:00

| Germany | 1 – 0 | Czech Republic |
|---|---|---|
| Rafael 76' | Report |

BayArena, Leverkusen
Attendance: 15,000
Referee: Mark Halsey (England)

Germany won 3–0 on aggregate

15 November 2005
21:00

| France | 2 – 1 | England |
|---|---|---|
| Ribéry 59'; Briand 86' (pen.) | Report | Bent 55' |

Stade Marcel Picot, Tomblaine
Attendance: 13,049
Referee: Matteo Trefoloni (Italy)

France won 3–2 on aggregate

15 November 2005
21:00

| Italy | 1 – 0 | Hungary |
|---|---|---|
| Pazzini 48' | Report |

Stadio Bruno Recchioni, Fermo
Attendance: 7,000
Referee: Michael Weiner (Germany)

Italy won 2–1 on aggregate

16 November 2005
13:30

| Croatia | 1 – 2 | Serbia and Montenegro |
|---|---|---|
| Eduardo 4' | Report | Biševac 20'; Stepanov 86' |

ŠRC Velika Gorica, Velika Gorica
Attendance: 2,808
Referee: Laurent Duhamel (France)

Serbia and Montenegro won 5–2 on aggregate

16 November 2005
19:00

| Denmark | 3 – 1 | Russia |
|---|---|---|
| Rasmussen 8'; Bergvold 16'; Kahlenberg 62' (pen.) | Report | Zhirkov 2' |

Brøndby Stadium, Brøndby
Attendance: 11,000
Referee: Alan Kelly (Ireland)

Denmark won 4–1 on aggregate

16 November 2005
19:45

| Netherlands | 2 – 0 | Slovenia |
|---|---|---|
| Huntelaar 11', 61' | Report |

Abe Lenstra Stadion, Heerenveen
Attendance: 21,000
Referee: Selçuk Dereli (Turkey)

Netherlands won 2–0 on aggregate

16 November 2005
20:30

| Belgium | 1 – 3 | Ukraine |
|---|---|---|
| De Ceulaer 40' | Report | Fomin 70'; Chyhrynskyi 83'; Milevskyi 90+3' |

Daknamstadion, Lokeren
Attendance: 4,102
Referee: Alexandru Tudor (Romania)

Ukraine won 5–4 on aggregate

16 November 2005
21:00

| Portugal | 2 – 1 | Switzerland |
|---|---|---|
| Almeida 55'; Varela 62' | Report | Degen 21' |

Estádio do Bessa, Porto
Attendance: 22,600
Referee: Espen Berntsen (Norway)

Portugal won 3–2 on aggregate
