= Milan Stepanov =

Serbian footballer

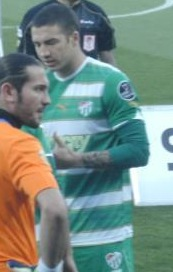
- Stepanov with Bursaspor

Personal information
- Date of birth: 2 April 1983 (age 43)
- Place of birth: Kisač, SFR Yugoslavia
- Height: 1.90 m (6 ft 3 in)
- Position: Centre-back

Youth career
- Tatra Kisač

Senior career*
Years	Team	Apps	(Gls)
2001–2006	Vojvodina	105	(6)
2006–2007	Trabzonspor	37	(1)
2007–2010	Porto	10	(0)
2009–2010	→ Málaga (loan)	12	(0)
2010–2012	Bursaspor	25	(2)
2012–2013	Mersin İdmanyurdu	26	(2)
2014–2015	Omonia	6	(0)
2015	Sarajevo	5	(0)
2016	Vojvodina	0	(0)
Total		226	(11)

International career
2006–2007	Serbia	6	(0)
- * Club domestic league appearances and goals

Milan Stepanov (Serbian Cyrillic: Милан Степанов; born 2 April 1983) is a Serbian retired footballer who played as a central defender.

== Club career ==
Born in Kisač, Novi Sad, Serbia, Socialist Federative Republic of Yugoslavia, Stepanov came up through Vojvodina's ranks, making his first-team debut during the 2000–01 season and becoming team captain five years later. In the 2006 January transfer window, he transferred to Turkish club Trabzonspor.

In July 2007, Stepanov moved to Porto in Portugal for a reported €3.5 million. Initially on the substitutes bench he gradually made room for himself in the starting eleven but, on 28 November, in a UEFA Champions League match at Liverpool, his team lost 1–4, with him having a subpar performance and subsequently losing the starting place to veteran Pedro Emanuel; this situation was aggravated in his second year with the signing of Rolando (he would only play in the penultimate Primeira Liga game).

On 27 July 2009, Stepanov moved on loan to Spain's Málaga, with the Andalusians having a buying option at the season's end. He only made four La Liga appearances in the first half of the campaign, and was left out of the squad for almost three months, only playing again in a 0–0 home draw against Deportivo La Coruña on 7 February 2010, where he started.

In late July 2010, Stepanov returned to Turkey, signing for Süper Lig champions Bursaspor for an undisclosed fee. In May 2012 his contract was terminated, and he joined fellow league side Mersin İdmanyurdu shortly after.

Subsequently, Stepanov represented Omonia and Sarajevo in quick succession. On 2 January 2016, after almost ten years, he returned to Vojvodina, signing a one-and-a-half-year deal with the club.

== International career ==
Stepanov was a part of the Serbian and Montenegrin team that was knocked out in the first round of the 2004 Summer Olympics after finishing fourth in Group C behind eventual winners Argentina, Australia and Tunisia. He played against the first and the third teams in two losses.

In November 2005, Stepanov appeared in a two-match qualification playoff against Croatia for the 2006 UEFA European Under-21 Championship in Portugal, and scored in the second leg in a 2–1 away win, netting the winner in the 86th minute (5–2 on aggregate). He eventually helped the national side reach the semifinals in the final stages, with many pundits agreeing he was the team's most consistent performer with a string of confident defensive displays throughout the tournament.

Stepanov made his senior team debut in a friendly match against Czech Republic on 16 August 2006, in which he was sent off. In March 2007, during the nation's UEFA Euro 2008 qualifying campaign, he started in the 1–2 loss to Kazakhstan and was on the bench against Portugal.

== Honours ==
Porto

- Primeira Liga: 2007–08, 2008–09
- Taça de Portugal: 2008–09
