= 2014 Changchun Yatai F.C. season =

Changchun Yatai F.C.
- Chairman: Liu Yuming
- Manager: Svetozar Šapurić(until April 22） Gao Jinggang（Caretaker, From April 22 to April 28） Dragan Okuka (From April 28 until end of the season)
- Super League: 13th
- FA Cup: Third Round
- Top goalscorer: League: Eninho (9 goals); All: Eninho (9 goals)

The 2014 Changchun Yatai F.C. season is Changchun's 9th consecutive season in the Chinese Super League. Changchun will also be competing in the Chinese FA Cup. Manager Šapurić was sacked for the second time by the club after a 2-3 loss to Guangzhou R&F on 20 April. His compatriot Okuka was appointed with a 1+1 contract 6 days later, and made his managerial debut for the club in a 1-3 loss against Harbin Yiteng on 4 May.
Changchun officially stayed up after a 1-1 draw against Hangzhou Greentown in the final game but did not go through the season with many relegation fears. The iconic moment of their 2014 season was that they beat league giant Guangzhou Evergrande home and away, became only the second Chinese team to achieve that, after Guangzhou R&F in 2012.

== Competitions ==
=== Chinese Super League ===
==== League table ====
Pos	Team	Pld	W	D	L	GF	GA	GD	Pts	Qualification or relegation
11	Shanghai Shenxin	30	9	6	15	26	42	−16	33 (Note: Shanghai S. 0–0 Liaoning; Liaoning 3–0 Shanghai S.)	
12	Hangzhou Greentown	30	8	8	14	43	60	−17	32 (Note: Changchun 2–3 Hangzhou; Hangzhou 1–1 Changchun)	
13	Changchun Yatai	30	8	8	14	33	40	−7	32	
14	Henan Jianye	30	6	12	12	32	39	−7	30	
15	Dalian Aerbin (R)	30	6	11	13	32	45	−13	29	Relegation to League One

Source: Chinese Super League (in Chinese)
Rules for classification: 1st points; 2nd head-to-head points; 3rd head-to-head goal difference; 4th head-to-head goals scored; 5th reserve league points; 6th goal difference; 7th goals scored; 8th disciplinary points (1 point for each yellow card, 3 points for each red card).
(R) Relegated

==== Matches ====
8 March 2014 1	Beijing Guoan	1 - 0	Changchun Yatai	Beijing
19:30	Batalla 67'	Summary		Stadium: Workers Stadium; Attendance: 36,080; Referee: Ma Ning

16 March 2014 2	Changchun Yatai	0 - 0	Henan Jianye	Changchun
15:30		Summary		Stadium: Development Area Stadium; Attendance: 10,128; Referee: Xu Hang

23 March 2014 3	Guangzhou Evergrande	1 - 3	Changchun Yatai	Guangzhou
20:00	Elkeson 58' (pen.)	Summary	Bećiraj 36'; Iglesias 40'; Eninho 50'	Stadium: Tianhe Stadium; Attendance: 42,894; Referee: Ai Kun

29 March 2014 4	Dalian Aerbin	2 - 1	Changchun Yatai	Dalian
15:30	Bruno 9'; Song Zhenyu 60' (o.g.)	Summary	Eninho 5' (pen.)	Stadium: Dalian Sports Center; Attendance: 12,818; Referee: Xu Hang

6 April 2014 5	Changchun Yatai	2 - 2	Shanghai Greenland	Changchun
15:30	Ismailov 25'; Rafael Coelho 90+4'	Summary	Ruiz 9'; Gao Di 43'	Stadium: Development Area Stadium; Attendance: 12,156; Referee: Huang Yejun

12 April 2014 6	Shanghai Dongya	1 - 0	Changchun Yatai	Shanghai
16:00	Wang Jiayu 6'	Summary		Stadium: Shanghai Stadium; Attendance: 13,002; Referee: Fu Ming
