= Montenegrin Footballer of the Year =

Annual football award in Montenegro

The Montenegrin Footballer of the Year is an annual award chosen by the team captains and the coaches of the Prva crnogorska fudbalska liga — 1. CFL to determine the best player in Montenegro. It is published by the Football Association of Montenegro. The most successful players is inaugural holder Mirko Vučinić and Stefan Savić, who each won the award for seven times. Stevan Jovetić is the youngest player to receive this honour so far; he was 20 years old when he won the award. The most recent footballer of the year is Nikola Krstović for 2025. Before 2006, two Montenegrin footballers were named Yugoslav Footballer of the Year; Dejan Savićević in 1995, and Predrag Mijatović (for three times) in 1992, 1993 and 1998.

== Winners ==
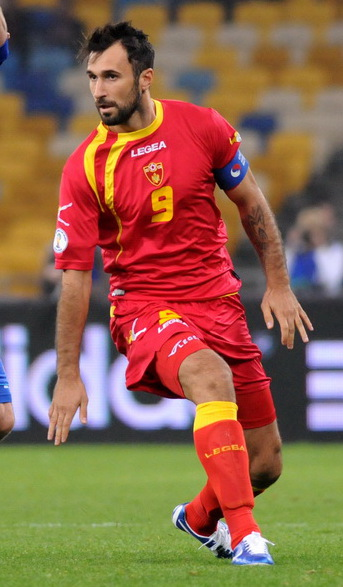
Mirko Vučinić has won the Player of the Year award for record seven times.

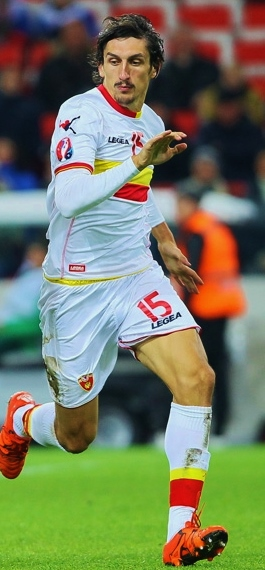
Stefan Savić has won the award for record seven times. Most successful defensive player.

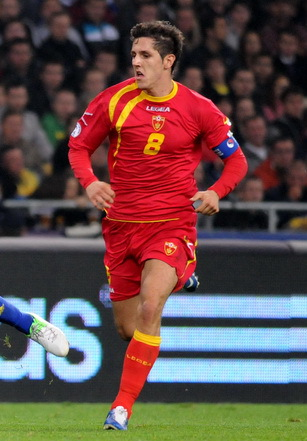
Stevan Jovetić was the youngest player awarded.

Year	Player	Club	Position
2006	Mirko Vučinić	(Italy) Lecce, Roma	Forward
2007	Mirko Vučinić (2)	(Italy) Roma (2)	Forward
2008	Mirko Vučinić (3)	(Italy) Roma (3)	Forward
2009	Stevan Jovetić	(Italy) Fiorentina	Forward
2010	Mirko Vučinić (4)	(Italy) Roma (4)	Forward
2011	Mirko Vučinić (5)	(Italy) Roma (5), Juventus	Forward
2012	Mirko Vučinić (6)	(Italy) Juventus (2)	Forward
2013	Mirko Vučinić (7)	(Italy) Juventus (3)	Forward
2014	Marko Baša	(France) Lille	Defender
2015	Stevan Jovetić (2)	(Italy) Internazionale	Forward
2016	Stefan Savić	(Spain) Atlético Madrid	Defender
2017	Stefan Savić (2)	(Spain) Atlético Madrid (2)	Defender
2018	Stefan Savić (3)	(Spain) Atlético Madrid (3)	Defender
2019	Stefan Mugoša	(South Korea) Incheon United	Forward
2020	Stefan Savić (4)	(Spain) Atlético Madrid (4)	Defender
2021	Stefan Savić (5)	(Spain) Atlético Madrid (5)	Defender
2022	Stefan Savić (6)	(Spain) Atlético Madrid (6)	Defender
2023	Stefan Savić (7)	(Spain) Atlético Madrid (7)	Defender
2024	Nikola Krstović	(Italy) Lecce (2)	Forward
2025	Nikola Krstović (2)	(Italy) Atalanta	Forward

== Statistics ==
=== Wins by player ===
Rank	Player	Wins	Winning years
1	Mirko Vučinić	7	2006–2008, 2010–2013
1	Stefan Savić	7	2016–2018, 2020–2023
3	Stevan Jovetić	2	2009, 2015
3	Nikola Krstović	2	2024, 2025
4	Marko Baša	1	2014
4	Stefan Mugoša	1	2019

=== Wins by club ===
Rank	Club	Wins	Winning years
1	(Spain) Atlético Madrid	7	2016–2018, 2020–2023
2	(Italy) Roma	5	2006–2008, 2010, 2011
3	(Italy) Juventus	3	2011–2013
4	(Italy) Lecce	2	2006, 2024
5	(Italy) Atalanta	1	2025
5	(Italy) Fiorentina	1	2009
5	(France) Lille	1	2014
5	(Italy) Internazionale	1	2015
5	(South Korea) Incheon United	1	2019

=== Wins by position ===
Rank	Position	Wins
1	Forward	12
2	Defender	7

== Controversy ==
In 2013, Mirko Vučinić won the Montenegrin Footballer of the Year for the seventh time. However, the public opinion was that in 2013, Dejan Damjanović should have been given the award. Damjanović scored four goals in the 2014 FIFA World Cup qualifiers (two against England and one against Poland and Ukraine), became the top goalscorer of the 2013 K League Classic, and led FC Seoul to the 2013 AFC Champions League final. The media agreed that Vučinić was the best overall Montenegrin footballer, however, Damjanović's performances in 2013 were far better than Vučinić's, who was injured during the decisive qualification matches of the national team. Finally, Montenegrin website CG-Fudbal awarded Damjanović "Best Montenegrin Footballer of the Year", according to a poll voted by the fans.
