= Budućnost =

Budućnost means "the future" in many Slavic languages, and it may also refer to:

- SD Budućnost Podgorica, a sports society from Podgorica, Montenegro
  - KK Budućnost Podgorica, a professional basketball club

FK Budućnost may refer to:

- FK Budućnost Banatski Dvor, defunct Serbian football club that was based in Banatski Dvor, in 2006 it merged with FK Proleter Zrenjanin to form FK Banat Zrenjanin
- FK Budućnost Banovići, Bosnian football club based in Banovići
- FK Budućnost Dobanovci, Serbian football club based in the Belgrade suburb of Dobanovci
- FK Budućnost Podgorica, Montenegrin football club based in Podgorica
- FK Budućnost Valjevo, defunct Serbian football club based in Valjevo
- FK Budućnost Krušik 2014, Serbian football club based in Valjevo
