= Stefan Mugoša =

Montenegrin footballer (born 1992)

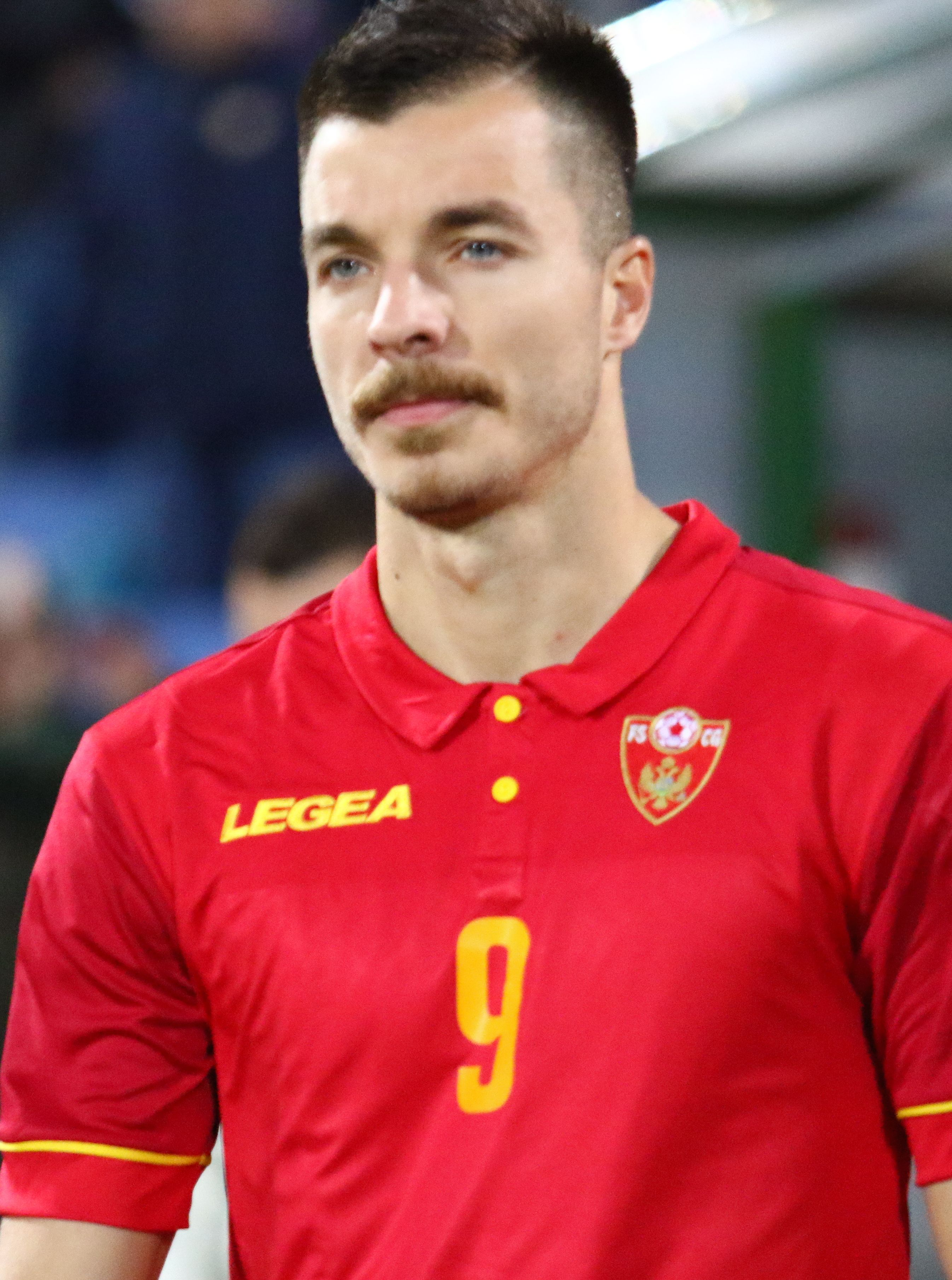
- Mugoša with Montenegro in 2019

Personal information
- Full name: Stefan Mugoša
- Date of birth: 26 February 1992 (age 34)
- Place of birth: Titograd, SR Montenegro, Yugoslavia
- Height: 1.88 m (6 ft 2 in)
- Position: Striker

Team information
- Current team: Incheon United
- Number: 9

Youth career
- Budućnost

Senior career*
Years	Team	Apps	(Gls)
2009–2013	Budućnost	74	(16)
2013–2014	Mladost	29	(15)
2014–2015	1. FC Kaiserslautern	2	(0)
2015	→ Erzgebirge Aue (loan)	15	(4)
2015–2017	1860 Munich	30	(0)
2017	→ Karlsruher SC (loan)	12	(2)
2017	Sheriff Tiraspol	13	(7)
2018–2022	Incheon United	129	(68)
2022–2023	Vissel Kobe	6	(0)
2023–	Incheon United	99	(46)

International career^{‡}
2009–2011	Montenegro U19	7	(3)
2012–2014	Montenegro U21	9	(5)
2015–2026	Montenegro	65	(16)
- * Club domestic league appearances and goals as of 3 November 2026 ‡ National team caps and goals as of 27 March 2036

Stefan Mugoša (Montenegrin Cyrillic: Стефан Мугоша; born 26 February 1992) is a Montenegrin professional footballer who plays as a striker for K League 1 club Incheon United.

== Club career ==
=== Early career ===
At 22 years of age, Mugoša was the top goalscorer at the 2013–14 Montenegrin First League, scoring 15 goals in 29 league appearances. As a result of his performance, foreign clubs started to show interest in him.

On 3 July 2014, Mugoša joined German 2. Bundesliga club 1. FC Kaiserslautern signing a three-year contract. On 27 January 2015, after only two games (one each at the league and cup), he was loaned to Erzgebirge Aue for the rest of the season. Aue were not granted a purchase option. He scored four goals at Aue, but the club was relegated to 3. Liga at the end of the season.

On 15 August 2015, Mugoša signed a three-year contract with 2. Bundesliga competitor 1860 Munich. On 27 November, he scored his first goal for 1860 Munich in a 2–1 win against Mainz 05 at the 2015–16 DFB-Pokal. On 31 January 2017, after playing for 1860 Munich for one and a half years, he was loaned to Karlsruher SC until the end of the 2016–17 season. He scored 6 goals in 59 appearances including 28 starts for three 2. Bundesliga seasons.

On 28 June 2017, Mugoša joined Moldovan club Sheriff Tiraspol. He helped Sheriff win the 2017 Moldovan National Division, and participated at the 2017–18 UEFA Europa League group stage.

=== Incheon United ===
After leaving Europe, Mugoša joined K League 1 side Incheon United on 8 February 2018. He quickly made an impression in South Korea, being compared to Dejan Damjanović, his compatriot and one of the greatest K League players of all time, in his first season at Incheon. He extended his contract with Incheon to 2021 after the season.

On 1 September 2019, Mugoša scored his first hat-trick for Incheon in a 3–3 draw with Ulsan Hyundai. He was selected as Montenegrin Footballer of the Year for 2019 by captains and managers of Montenegrin First League clubs after scoring double-digit goals for the second consecutive season at the K League 1 as well as showing effort at the national team.

On 6 September 2020, Mugoša scored his second K League 1 hat-trick in a 3–2 win over Gangwon FC. On 24 December, he agreed a contract extension to 2023.

On 23 July 2021, Mugoša simultaneously reached 100 appearances and 50 goals at the K League 1 by scoring two goals in a 2–1 win over Suwon Samsung Bluewings. In 2022, Mugoša scored in six consecutive K League 1 matches between the fifth and tenth matchdays.

=== Vissel Kobe ===
In June 2022, Mugoša had been offered an annual salary of $2 million, more than double the $0.9 million at Incheon, by J1 League club Vissel Kobe, and signed for them on 30 June. However, Kobe manager Miguel Ángel Lotina, who wanted him, was sacked just after his transfer, and new manager Takayuki Yoshida did not prefer him. He made twelve appearances including five starts without a goal for one year at Kobe.

=== Return to Incheon United ===
On 10 July 2023, Mugoša returned to Incheon United one year after his farewell. Mugoša renounced his residual salary at Kobe to leave them, and looked forward to returning to Incheon by refusing other Asian clubs' offers.

On 24 November 2024, Mugoša changed his role to a goalkeeper in the middle of the last league match against Daegu FC. Incheon goalkeeper Lee Bum-soo suffered a fracture and the club already put all five substitutes into the field at the time. Mugoša became the second foreign player to play as a goalkeeper at the K League and the first foreign player to do so at the K League 1 after the K League started to prohibit clubs from recruiting foreign goalkeepers in 1999. He conceded one goal, but succeed to defend Incheon's lead, which ended in a 3–1 win. After the match, he became the top goalscorer at the 2024 K League 1, but the club was relegated to the K League 2 despite his contribution.

On 25 May 2025, Mugoša scored two penalty goals in a 2–0 win over Jeonnam Dragons, reaching 100 goals at Incheon. He also scored the most goals at the K League 2, promoting Incheon to the K League 1 just a year after their relegation.

== International career ==
In August 2012, Mugoša participated in the Valeri Lobanovsky Memorial Tournament, where his team lost in the final to Slovakia on penalties and took silver medals.

On 8 June 2015, Mugoša made his senior debut for Montenegro in a friendly against Denmark. On 26 March 2017, he scored his first senior international goal in a FIFA World Cup qualifier against Poland, which ended in a 2–1 loss.

On 14 July 2022, Mugoša scored a hat-trick in a UEFA Nations League B match against Romania, leading Montenegro's 3–0 win.

On 27 March 2026, Mugoša played his final match for Montenegro in a friendly against Andorra, where he scored a goal in a 2–0 win.

== Personal life ==
Mugoša is one of the most popular footballers for South Korean drivers due to his name similar to Korean word "Musago" (무사고), which means "no accident". His name is frequently used in word play. South Koreans say "pray for Mugosa" (무고사 기원) whenever they buy a new car.

== Career statistics ==
=== Club ===
As of match played 2 November 2025

Appearances and goals by club, season and competition
Club	Season	League			National cup (Note: Includes Montenegrin Cup, DFB-Pokal, Korea Cup, Emperor's Cup)		Continental		Total	
Club	Season	Division	Apps	Goals	Apps	Goals	Apps	Goals	Apps	Goals
Budućnost	2009–10	1. CFL	7	0	0	0	—		7	0
Budućnost	2010–11	1. CFL	19	7	1	0	1 (Note: Appearance in UEFA Europa League)	0	21	7
Budućnost	2011–12	1. CFL	19	2	0	0	1	0	20	2
Budućnost	2012–13	1. CFL	29	7	4	0	1 (Note: Appearance in UEFA Champions League)	0	34	7
Budućnost	Total		74	16	5	0	3	0	82	16
Mladost	2013–14	1. CFL	29	15	4	1	—		33	16
1. FC Kaiserslautern	2014–15	2. Bundesliga	1	0	1	0	—		2	0
1. FC Kaiserslautern	2015–16	2. Bundesliga	1	0	0	0	—		1	0
1. FC Kaiserslautern	Total		2	0	1	0	—		3	0
Erzgebirge Aue (loan)	2014–15	2. Bundesliga	15	4	—		—		15	4
1860 Munich	2015–16	2. Bundesliga	20	0	2	1	—		22	1
1860 Munich	2016–17	2. Bundesliga	10	0	1	0	—		11	0
1860 Munich	Total		30	0	3	1	—		33	1
Karlsruher SC (loan)	2016–17	2. Bundesliga	12	2	—		—		12	2
Sheriff Tiraspol	2017	Divizia Națională	13	7	—		8 (Note: Four appearances in UEFA Champions League, four appearances in UEFA Europa League)	0	21	7
Incheon United	2018	K League 1	35	19	0	0	—		35	19
Incheon United	2019	K League 1	32	14	0	0	—		32	14
Incheon United	2020	K League 1	24	12	0	0	—		24	12
Incheon United	2021	K League 1	20	9	0	0	—		20	9
Incheon United	2022	K League 1	18	14	0	0	—		18	14
Incheon United	Total		129	68	0	0	—		129	68
Vissel Kobe	2022	J1 League	5	0	2	0	1 (Note: Appearance(s) in AFC Champions League)	0	8	0
Vissel Kobe	2023	J1 League	1	0	3	0	—		4	0
Vissel Kobe	Total		6	0	5	0	1	0	12	0
Incheon United	2023	K League 1	9	3	1	0	5	2	15	5
Incheon United	2024	K League 1	38	15	1	0	—		39	15
Incheon United	2025	K League 2	34	20	0	0	—		34	20
Incheon United	Total		81	38	2	0	5	2	88	40
Career total			391	150	20	2	17	2	428	154

=== International ===
Scores and results list Montenegro's goal tally first, score column indicates score after each Mugoša goal.

List of international goals scored by Stefan Mugoša
No.	Date	Venue	Opponent	Score	Result	Competition
1	26 March 2017	Podgorica City Stadium, Podgorica, Montenegro	Poland	1–1	1–2	2018 FIFA World Cup qualification
2	8 October 2017	National Stadium, Warsaw, Poland	Poland	1–2	2–4	2018 FIFA World Cup qualification
3	27 March 2018	Podgorica City Stadium, Podgorica, Montenegro	Turkey	2–2	2–2	Friendly
4	14 October 2018	LFF Stadium, Vilnius, Lithuania	Lithuania	1–0	4–1	2018–19 UEFA Nations League C
5	14 October 2018	LFF Stadium, Vilnius, Lithuania	Lithuania	3–0	4–1	2018–19 UEFA Nations League C
6	17 November 2018	Red Star Stadium, Belgrade, Serbia	Serbia	1–2	1–2	2018–19 UEFA Nations League C
7	22 March 2019	Vasil Levski National Stadium, Sofia, Bulgaria	Bulgaria	1–0	1–1	UEFA Euro 2020 qualifying
8	7 June 2019	Podgorica City Stadium, Podgorica, Montenegro	Kosovo	1–1	1–1	UEFA Euro 2020 qualifying
9	5 September 2019	Podgorica City Stadium, Podgorica, Montenegro	Hungary	2–1	2–1	Friendly
10	19 November 2019	Podgorica City Stadium, Podgorica, Montenegro	Belarus	1–0	2–0	Friendly
11	17 November 2020	Podgorica City Stadium, Podgorica, Montenegro	Cyprus	4–0	4–0	2020–21 UEFA Nations League C
12	4 June 2022	Podgorica City Stadium, Podgorica, Montenegro	Romania	1–0	2–0	2022–23 UEFA Nations League B
13	14 June 2022	Stadionul Rapid-Giulești, Bucharest, Romania	Romania	1–0	3–0	2022–23 UEFA Nations League B
14	14 June 2022	Stadionul Rapid-Giulești, Bucharest, Romania	Romania	2–0	3–0	2022–23 UEFA Nations League B
15	14 June 2022	Stadionul Rapid-Giulești, Bucharest, Romania	Romania	3–0	3–0	2022–23 UEFA Nations League B
16	27 March 2026	Podgorica City Stadium, Podgorica, Montenegro	Andorra	1–0	2–0	Friendly

== Honours ==
Budućnost

- Montenegrin First League: 2011–12
- Montenegrin Cup: 2012–13

Sheriff Tiraspol

- Divizia Națională: 2017

Incheon United

- K League 2: 2025

Individual

- Montenegrin First League top goalscorer: 2013–14
- Montenegrin FA Player of the Year: 2019
- K League Player of the Month: September 2020, February/March 2022, April 2022
- K League 1 top goalscorer: 2024
- K League 2 top goalscorer: 2025
- K League 2 Best XI: 2025
- K League All-Star: 2026
