= Fatos Bećiraj =

Montenegrin footballer (born 1988)

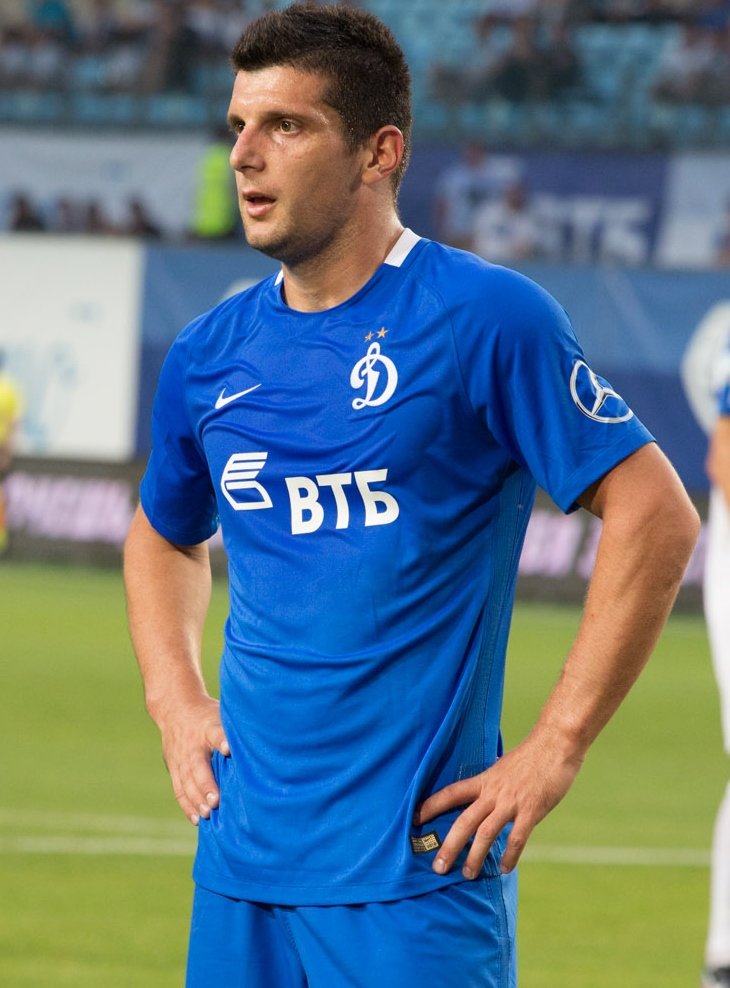
- Bećiraj with Dynamo Moscow in 2016

Personal information
- Date of birth: 5 May 1988 (age 38)
- Place of birth: Peja, SR Serbia, Yugoslavia
- Height: 1.88 m (6 ft 2 in)
- Position: Striker

Youth career
- 2005–2007: Shqiponja

Senior career*
Years	Team	Apps	(Gls)
2007	Besa Pejë		
2008–2010	Budućnost	81	(39)
2010–2014	Dinamo Zagreb	90	(30)
2014	Changchun Yatai	28	(7)
2015	Dinamo Minsk	23	(9)
2016–2017	Dynamo Moscow	60	(13)
2018	Mechelen	4	(0)
2018–2020	Maccabi Netanya	54	(20)
2020–2021	Wisła Kraków	10	(0)
2021	→ Bnei Yehuda (loan)	13	(2)
2021	Astana	7	(2)
2022	Dečić	32	(6)
2023	Mornar	16	(2)
Total		418	(130)

International career
2009–2010	Montenegro U21	5	(0)
2009–2022	Montenegro	86	(15)
- * Club domestic league appearances and goals

Fatos Bećiraj (Montenegrin: Фатос Бећирај, Albanian: Fatos Besim Beqiraj; born 5 May 1988) is a Montenegrin former professional footballer who played as a striker.

He played his final season in 2023 with Mornar, after which he retired from professional football. In September 2026, he was appointed sporting director of football club Budućnost.

== Club career ==
=== Early career and Budućnost ===
Bećiraj began his career in his hometown of Peja with the local club Shqiponja at 17 years of age, before joining their city rivals Besa Pejë in July 2007. After spending the first half of the 2007–08 season with Besa Pejë, his good performances in the Kosovar Superliga attracted attention from several clubs in the region, and in January 2008, Bećiraj moved to the Montenegrin First League side Budućnost Podgorica.

He immediately established himself as a first team regular at Budućnost, scoring 9 goals in 15 appearances in the second half of the 2007–08 season, helping the club win the Montenegrin championship title and finish runners-up in the 2007–08 Montenegrin Cup. In the following two seasons, Bećiraj scored 28 league goals in 62 matches for the club, becoming league top scorer in the 2008–09 season with 18 goals scored.

=== Dinamo Zagreb ===
On 30 August 2010, it was announced that Bećiraj signed for Croatian club Dinamo Zagreb. He played well in his debut season with Dinamo and became regularly called up to the Montenegro national team. He played in 22 league matches and scored 8 goals, most notably a beautiful goal against Rijeka and a fine header against Hajduk Split.

Bećiraj struggled to find his goalscoring form at the beginning of the 2011–12 season, finally scoring after eight matches without a goal, netting the fifth goal in a 5–0 win against Karlovac. He then scored the last goal in a 4–1 win against Malmö in the 2011–12 UEFA Champions League Play-off. Bećiraj then continued his goalscoring form in domestic competition, scoring against Varaždin, Istra 1961, Zadar, Šibenik and Split.

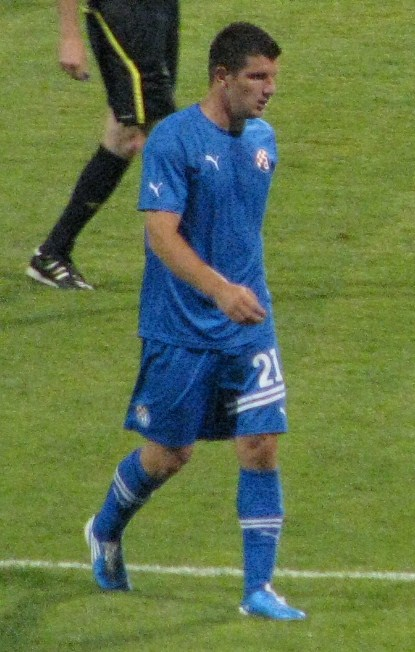
Bećiraj with Dinamo Zagreb in 2011

On 22 November 2011, Bećiraj scored Dinamo's first goal in the 2011–12 UEFA Champions League, netting a header in the club's 6–2 away loss to Real Madrid at the Santiago Bernabéu.

Bećiraj was the first choice striker throughout the 2011–12 season and became top scorer of the Prva HNL with 15 goals in 28 appearances, becoming the first foreign player to accomplish that feat.

=== Changchun Yatai ===
In February 2014, Bećiraj transferred to Chinese Super League side Changchun Yatai. On 8 March 2014, he made his debut for Yatai in a 1-0 away defeat against Beijing Guoan. On 23 April 2014, he scored his first goal for the club in a 3-1 away win against defending champions Guangzhou Evergrande. He made 28 appearances for Yatai in the 2014 season and scored 7 goals.

=== Dinamo Minsk ===
In January 2015, Bećiraj transferred to Belarusian Premier League side Dinamo Minsk. On 6 August 2015, he scored a 118th-minute winner in a 1–1 extra-time (2–1 aggregate) win over Swiss side Zürich in the second leg of the 2015–16 UEFA Europa League third qualifying round.

=== Dynamo Moscow ===
On 18 February 2016, Bećiraj signed a 3.5-year contract with Russian side Dynamo Moscow. He scored his first goal for Dynamo Moscow on 19 March 2016, giving his club a 1–0 win against Ufa. On 11 January 2018, Bećiraj's Dynamo contract was dissolved by mutual consent, making him a free agent.

=== Mechelen ===
The day after leaving Dynamo Moscow, on 12 January 2018, Bećiraj signed a contract with the Belgian First Division A club Mechelen.

=== Maccabi Netanya ===
On 5 September 2018, Bećiraj signed with Israeli Premier League side Maccabi Netanya. He was the top goalscorer for the club in his debut season scoring 15 goals in all club competitions. His second season with Netanya wasn't as successful, scoring only 7 times in the league and once in the Toto Cup. On 7 June 2020, Bećiraj requested to be released from the club. In the two seasons with the club, he scored a total of 23 goals in 63 appearances for the club.

=== Wisła Kraków ===
On 25 July 2020, Bećiraj signed with Polish Ekstraklasa side Wisła Kraków on a two-year contract after leaving Maccabi Netanya by contract termination.

=== Bnei Yehuda ===
On 11 February 2021, Bećiraj signed for Bnei Yehuda of the Israeli Premier League.

== International career ==
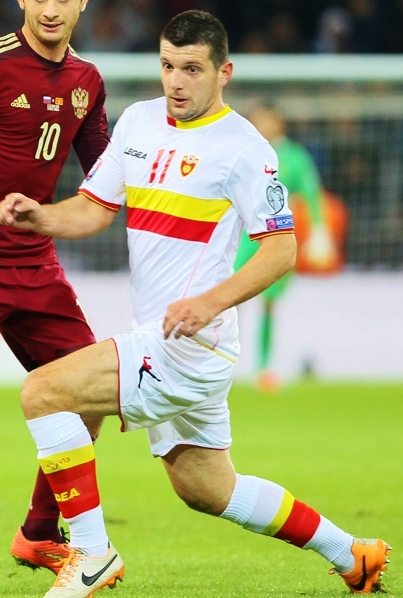
Bećiraj playing for Montenegro in 2015

Bećiraj was first called up for the Montenegro U21 national team by head coach Dušan Vlaisavljević in 2009, winning his first cap in a 2011 European Under-21 Championship qualifier against Kazakhstan on 7 June 2009. He went on to earn five caps for the U21 team before receiving his first call-up for the senior team in March 2009, for a 2010 FIFA World Cup qualifier against Italy. Bećiraj made his international debut in that match, coming on as a substitute for Radomir Đalović in the 70th minute of the game. He scored his first goal for Montenegro on 17 November 2010 in a friendly match against Azerbaijan. On 7 June 2019, Bećiraj captained Montenegro in a 1–1 draw against Kosovo. In November 2022, Bećiraj announced the end of his national team career, after 86 appearances and 15 scored goals.

== Career statistics ==
=== Club ===
Appearances and goals by club, season and competition
Club	Season	League			National cup (Note: Includes Croatian Cup, Belarusian Cup, Russian Cup, Israel State Cup, Polish Cup, Kazakhstan Cup, Montenegrin Cup)		Continental		Other		Total	
Club	Season	Division	Apps	Goals	Apps	Goals	Apps	Goals	Apps	Goals	Apps	Goals
Budućnost Podgorica	2007–08	Montenegrin 1. CFL	15	9	—		—		—		15	9
Budućnost Podgorica	2008–09	Montenegrin 1. CFL	32	18	—		2 (Note: Appearances in UEFA Champions League)	2	—		34	20
Budućnost Podgorica	2009–10	Montenegrin 1. CFL	30	10	—		2 (Note: Appearances in UEFA Europa League)	0	—		32	10
Budućnost Podgorica	2010–11	Montenegrin 1. CFL	4	2	—		4	2	—		8	4
Budućnost Podgorica	Total		81	39	—		8	4	—		89	43
Dinamo Zagreb	2010–11	1. HNL	22	8	6	6	6	0	—		34	14
Dinamo Zagreb	2011–12	1. HNL	28	15	5	1	12	2	—		45	18
Dinamo Zagreb	2012–13	1. HNL	27	4	1	1	10	2	—		38	7
Dinamo Zagreb	2013–14	1. HNL	13	3	3	2	4 (Note: One appearance and one goal in UEFA Champions League, three appearances and one goal in UEFA Europa League)	2	0	0	20	7
Dinamo Zagreb	Total		90	30	15	10	32	6	0	0	137	46
Changchun Yatai	2014	Chinese Super League	28	7	0	0	—		—		28	7
Dinamo Minsk	2015	Belarusian Premier League	23	9	7	6	12	4	—		42	19
Dynamo Moscow	2015–16	Russian Premier League	12	2	1	0	—		—		17	2
Dynamo Moscow	2016–17	Russian FNL	30	9	3	1	–		–		33	10
Dynamo Moscow	2017–18	Russian Premier League	18	2	0	0	—		—		18	2
Dynamo Moscow	Total		60	13	4	1	—		—		64	14
Mechelen	2017–18	Belgian First Division A	4	0	0	0	—		—		4	0
Maccabi Netanya	2018–19	Israeli Premier League	30	13	3	2	—		—		33	15
Maccabi Netanya	2019–20	Israeli Premier League	24	7	6	1	—		—		30	8
Maccabi Netanya	Total		54	20	9	3	—		—		63	23
Wisła Kraków	2020–21	Ekstraklasa	10	0	1	0	—		—		11	0
Bnei Yehuda (loan)	2020–21	Israeli Premier League	13	2	0	0	—		—		13	2
Astana	2021	Kazakhstan Premier League	7	2	7	0	4 (Note: Appearances in UEFA Europa Conference League)	0	—		18	2
Dečić	2021–22	Montenegrin 1. CFL	14	1	3	0	—		—		17	1
Dečić	2022–23	Montenegrin 1. CFL	18	5	1	1	—		—		34	20
Dečić	Total		32	6	4	1	—		—		36	7
Mornar	2022–23	Montenegrin 1. CFL	16	2	—		—		2 (Note: Appearances in Montenegrin First League relegation play-offs)	1	18	3
career total			418	130	47	21	56	14	2	1	519	165

=== International ===
Appearances and goals by national team and year
National team	Year	Apps	Goals
Montenegro
Montenegro	2009	3	0
Montenegro	2010	7	1
Montenegro	2011	4	0
Montenegro	2012	5	2
Montenegro	2013	6	0
Montenegro	2014	5	0
Montenegro	2015	7	2
Montenegro	2016	7	2
Montenegro	2017	6	2
Montenegro	2018	9	0
Montenegro	2019	10	0
Montenegro	2020	6	1
Montenegro	2021	10	5
Montenegro	2022	1	0
Total		86	15

Scores and results list Montenegro's goal tally first, score column indicates score after each Bećiraj goal.

List of international goals scored by Fatos Bećiraj
No.	Date	Venue	Cap	Opponent	Score	Result	Competition
1	17 November 2010	Podgorica City Stadium, Podgorica, Montenegro	10	Azerbaijan	2–0	2–0	Friendly
2	11 September 2012	Stadio Olimpico, Serravalle, San Marino	18	San Marino	2–0	6–0	2014 FIFA World Cup qualification
3	11 September 2012	Stadio Olimpico, Serravalle, San Marino	18	San Marino	3–0	6–0	2014 FIFA World Cup qualification
4	5 September 2015	Podgorica City Stadium, Podgorica, Montenegro	33	Liechtenstein	1–0	2–0	UEFA Euro 2016 qualification
5	9 October 2015	Podgorica City Stadium, Podgorica, Montenegro	35	Austria	2–1	2–3	UEFA Euro 2016 qualification
6	8 October 2016	Podgorica City Stadium, Podgorica, Montenegro	42	Kazakhstan	4–0	5–0	2018 FIFA World Cup qualification
7	11 October 2016	Parken Stadium, Copenhagen, Denmark	43	Denmark	1–0	1–0	2018 FIFA World Cup qualification
8	10 June 2017	Podgorica City Stadium, Podgorica, Montenegro	47	Armenia	1–0	4–1	2018 FIFA World Cup qualification
9	1 September 2017	Astana Arena, Astana, Kazakhstan	48	Kazakhstan	2–0	3–0	2018 FIFA World Cup qualification
10	8 September 2020	Stade Josy Barthel, Luxembourg City, Luxembourg	71	Luxembourg	1–0	1–0	2020–21 UEFA Nations League C
11	27 March 2021	Podgorica City Stadium, Podgorica, Montenegro	77	Gibraltar	1–0	4–1	2022 FIFA World Cup qualification
12	5 June 2021	Podgorica City Stadium, Podgorica, Montenegro	80	Israel	1–2	1–3	Friendly
13	8 October 2021	Victoria Stadium, Gibraltar	81	Gibraltar	2–0	3–0	2022 FIFA World Cup qualification
14	8 October 2021	Victoria Stadium, Gibraltar	81	Gibraltar	3–0	3–0	2022 FIFA World Cup qualification
15	16 November 2021	Podgorica City Stadium, Podgorica, Montenegro	85	Turkey	1–0	1–2	2022 FIFA World Cup qualification

== Honours ==
Budućnost Podgorica

- Montenegrin First League: 2007–08

Dinamo Zagreb

- 1. HNL: 2010–11, 2011–12, 2012–13
- Croatian Cup: 2010–11, 2011–12
- Croatian Super Cup: 2013

Dynamo Moscow

- Russian Football National League: 2016–17

Individual

- Montenegrin First League top goalscorer: 2008–09 (18 goals)
- 1. HNL top goalscorer: 2011–12 (15 goals)
