= Stefan Savić =

Montenegrin footballer (born 1991)

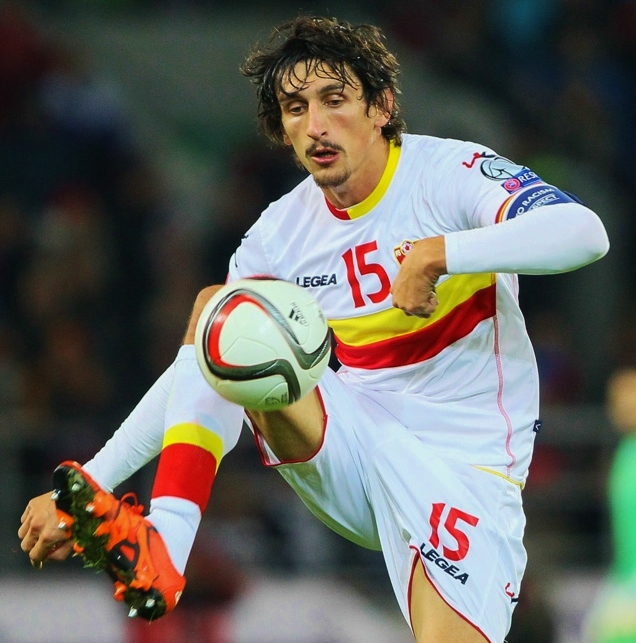
- Savić with Montenegro in 2015

Personal information
- Full name: Stefan Savić
- Date of birth: 8 January 1991 (age 35)
- Place of birth: Mojkovac, SR Montenegro, SFR Yugoslavia
- Height: 1.87 m (6 ft 2 in)
- Position: Centre-back

Team information
- Current team: Trabzonspor
- Number: 15

Youth career
- Brskovo
- 2007–2009: BSK Borča

Senior career*
Years	Team	Apps	(Gls)
2009–2010	BSK Borča	27	(1)
2010–2011	Partizan	20	(1)
2011–2012	Manchester City	12	(1)
2012–2015	Fiorentina	86	(4)
2015–2024	Atlético Madrid	217	(2)
2024–	Trabzonspor	45	(2)

International career^{‡}
2007	Montenegro U17	3	(0)
2008–2010	Montenegro U19	7	(0)
2009–2010	Montenegro U21	5	(0)
2010–	Montenegro	82	(9)
- * Club domestic league appearances and goals as of 1 November 2026 (UTC) ‡ National team caps and goals as of 13 November 2026 (UTC)

Stefan Savić (Montenegrin Cyrillic: Стефан Савић, pronounced [stêfaːn sâʋitɕ]; born 8 January 1991) is a Montenegrin professional footballer who plays as a centre-back for Süper Lig club Trabzonspor and the Montenegro national team.

Born in Mojkovac, Savić started his career at the local club Brskovo, before moving to BSK Borča, and then to Partizan. He won the double with Partizan, and then joined Manchester City for £6 million, winning the Premier League title in his only season there. In 2012, he was transferred to Fiorentina, making over 100 appearances across three seasons before signing with Atlético Madrid in 2015, where his team reached the 2016 UEFA Champions League final, won the UEFA Europa League and UEFA Super Cup in 2018, and won La Liga in 2021.

A full international since 2010, Savić has made over 70 appearances and scored nine goals for Montenegro.

== Club career ==
=== Career in Serbia ===
Savić began his professional career with BSK Borča during the 2008–09 season. In early 2010, he was on a ten-day trial with Arsenal. According to Savić, he had agreed to join Arsenal in the summer, but the transfer never went through.

On 29 August 2010, it was announced that Savić had signed for Partizan on a four-year contract and was given the number 15 shirt. He made four appearances in the 2010–11 UEFA Champions League group stage and helped the club win the double.

=== Manchester City ===
On 6 July 2011, Savić signed a four-year contract for Manchester City in a £6 million deal. He made his debut against Swansea City on 15 August as a substitute at the City of Manchester Stadium. On 1 October, he came off the bench and scored his first goal for the club in a 4–0 victory away to Blackburn Rovers, heading in the conclusive goal from a corner from Samir Nasri.

Throughout centre-back Vincent Kompany's four-match ban from 11 to 25 January, Savić replaced him in the starting line-up, with third-choice Kolo Touré away on international duty with the Ivory Coast in the 2012 Africa Cup of Nations. Although Savić showed brief flashes of form in this time, he showed many instances of nervousness resulting in frequent misplaced passes, clearances and crucially conceded a penalty against Liverpool in a League Cup match, resulting in a Liverpool win. Via a poor first touch, he caused Jermain Defoe's goal in City's 3–2 win over Tottenham Hotspur. With Kompany's return to the starting team, Savić returned to the bench. He ended the season with 12 league appearances, enough for a medal, as Manchester City won the 2011–12 Premier League on the last day of the season.

=== Fiorentina ===
On 31 August 2012, Italian Serie A club Fiorentina signed Savić as part of a deal for Matija Nastasić to transfer the other way. He was given the number 15 shirt and made his Fiorentina debut on 7 October, playing the full 90 minutes in a 1–0 win over Bologna, and in December he scored his first two goals in a 2–2 home draw with Sampdoria. He finished the season with 26 league appearances and one Coppa Italia appearance, helping Fiorentina to finish in fourth place in the 2012–13 Serie A, thereby securing a UEFA Europa League place for 2013–14.

Savić continued to be a mainstay in the Fiorentina defence in the 2013–14 season, making 31 appearances in the league as Fiorentina again finished in fourth place. Savić made four appearances in the Europa League proper and two more in qualifying as Fiorentina made the last 16 of the competition, being beaten 2–1 on aggregate by rivals Juventus. He also played both matches in the Coppa Italia semi-final win over Udinese and in the final, where his side lost 3–1 to Napoli.

In the 2014–15 season, Savić reached the milestone of 100 appearances for Fiorentina in all competitions. He was a major part of their run to the semi-finals in the 2014–15 Europa League and the third consecutive fourth-place finish in Serie A, making 41 appearances in all competitions.

=== Atlético Madrid ===
On 20 July 2015, Savić moved to Atlético Madrid for €10 million fee and signed a five-year contract with the club; midfielder Mario Suárez moving in the opposite direction for free as part of the deal, though Suárez later sold for €4 million in January 2016. Savić became the first Montenegrin footballer who played in the Champions League final in the 21st century, 18 years after Predrag Mijatović, who scored decisive goal in the 1998 final for Real Madrid against Juventus.

=== Trabzonspor ===
On 25 July 2024, Süper Lig club Trabzonspor confirmed that Savić had signed for the club.

== International career ==
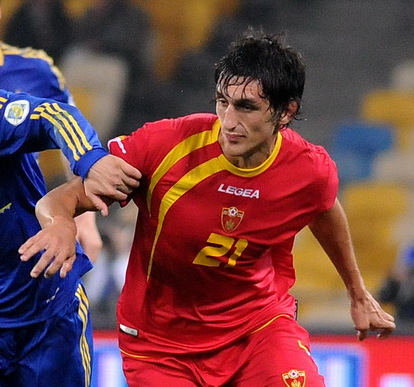
Savić playing against Ukraine in 2012

Having represented Montenegro at every youth level, Savić made his international debut for the senior team in a friendly match against Northern Ireland on 11 August 2010, replacing Milan Jovanović for the final 15 minutes at the Stadion Pod Goricom. On 10 August 2011, he scored twice in a 3–2 friendly loss to neighbours Albania at the Loro Boriçi Stadium in Shkodër.

== Personal life ==
Stefan's father Dragan was the president of the municipal assembly in Mojkovac when he committed suicide on 6 April 2011 when Stefan was 20 years old. Subsequently, Red Star Belgrade's Delije ultras, who are otherwise not known for being sympathetic to people associated with crosstown rivals Partizan, held up a banner which said "Support for Stefan Savić" after the loss of his father.

In addition to his native Serbian, Savić speaks English, Italian, and Spanish fluently.

== Career statistics ==
=== Club ===
As of match played 1 November 2026

Appearances and goals by club, season and competition
Club	Season	League			National cup (Note: Includes Serbian Cup, FA Cup, Coppa Italia, Copa del Rey, Turkish Cup)		League cup (Note: Includes EFL Cup)		Europe		Other		Total	
Club	Season	Division	Apps	Goals	Apps	Goals	Apps	Goals	Apps	Goals	Apps	Goals	Apps	Goals
BSK Borča	2008–09	Serbian First League	3	0			—						3	0
BSK Borča	2009–10	Serbian SuperLiga	21	1	1	1	—						22	2
BSK Borča	2010–11	Serbian SuperLiga	3	0			—						3	0
BSK Borča	Total		27	1	1	1	—						28	2
Partizan	2010–11	Serbian SuperLiga	20	1	4	0	—		4 (Note: Appearances in UEFA Champions League)	0	—		28	1
Manchester City	2011–12	Premier League	11	1	1	0	5	0	3 (Note: Two appearances in UEFA Champions League, one appearance in UEFA Europa League)	0	0		20	1
Manchester City	2012–13	Premier League	0								1 (Note: Appearance in FA Community Shield)	0	1	0
Manchester City	Total		11	1	1	0	5	0	3	0	1	0	21	1
Fiorentina	2012–13	Serie A	26	2	1	0	—		—		—		27	2
Fiorentina	2013–14	Serie A	31	0	3	0	—		6 (Note: Appearance(s) in UEFA Europa League)	0	—		40	0
Fiorentina	2014–15	Serie A	29	2	3	0	—		9	0	—		41	2
Fiorentina	Total		86	4	7	0	—		15	0	—		108	4
Atlético Madrid	2015–16	La Liga	12	0	5	0	—		7	0	—		24	0
Atlético Madrid	2016–17	La Liga	32	1	7	0	—		10	0	—		49	1
Atlético Madrid	2017–18	La Liga	27	0	3	0	—		7 (Note: Three appearances in UEFA Champions League, four appearances in UEFA Europa League)	0	—		37	0
Atlético Madrid	2018–19	La Liga	18	0	2	0	—		1	0	1 (Note: Appearance in UEFA Super Cup)	0	22	0
Atlético Madrid	2019–20	La Liga	22	0	0	0	—		4	1	2 (Note: Appearance(s) in Supercopa de España)	0	28	1
Atlético Madrid	2020–21	La Liga	33	1	1	0	—		8	0	—		42	1
Atlético Madrid	2021–22	La Liga	28	0	0	0	—		5	0	0		33	0
Atlético Madrid	2022–23	La Liga	22	0	4	0	—		3	0	—		29	0
Atlético Madrid	2023–24	La Liga	23	0	3	0	—		6	0	1	0	33	0
Atlético Madrid	Total		217	2	25	0	—		51	1	4	0	297	3
Trabzonspor	2024–25	Süper Lig	13	0	4	0	—		3 (Note: One appearance in UEFA Europa League, two appearances in UEFA Conference League)	0	—		20	0
Trabzonspor	2025–26	Süper Lig	22	1	4	0	—		—		0		26	1
Trabzonspor	2026–27	Süper Lig	10	1	0	0	—		1	0	0		11	1
Trabzonspor	Total		45	2	8	0	—		4	0	0	0	57	2
Career total			406	11	46	1	5	0	77	1	5	0	539	15

=== International ===
As of match played 12 November 2026

Appearances and goals by national team and year
National team	Year	Apps	Goals
Montenegro
Montenegro	2010	4	0
Montenegro	2011	8	2
Montenegro	2012	7	0
Montenegro	2013	6	0
Montenegro	2014	4	0
Montenegro	2015	7	1
Montenegro	2016	4	1
Montenegro	2017	6	0
Montenegro	2018	4	1
Montenegro	2019	2	0
Montenegro	2020	3	0
Montenegro	2021	6	0
Montenegro	2022	3	2
Montenegro	2023	8	2
Montenegro	2024	1	0
Montenegro	2025	4	0
Montenegro	2026	5	0
Total		82	9

As of match played 6 June 2025. Montenegro score listed first, score column indicates score after each Savić goal.

International goals by date, venue, cap, opponent, score, result and competition
No.	Date	Venue	Cap	Opponent	Score	Result	Competition
1	10 August 2011	Loro Boriçi Stadium, Shkodër, Albania	7	Albania	1–1	2–3	Friendly
2	10 August 2011	Loro Boriçi Stadium, Shkodër, Albania	7	Albania	2–1	2–3	Friendly
3	8 September 2015	Zimbru Stadium, Chișinău, Moldova	33	Moldova	1–0	2–0	UEFA Euro 2016 qualification
4	8 October 2016	Podgorica City Stadium, Podgorica, Montenegro	38	Kazakhstan	5–0	5–0	2018 FIFA World Cup qualification
5	10 September 2018	Podgorica City Stadium, Podgorica, Montenegro	50	Lithuania	1–0	2–0	2018–19 UEFA Nations League C
6	17 November 2022	Podgorica City Stadium, Podgorica, Montenegro	63	Slovakia	1–2	2–2	Friendly
7	17 November 2022	Podgorica City Stadium, Podgorica, Montenegro	63	Slovakia	2–2	2–2	Friendly
8	7 September 2023	Darius and Girėnas Stadium, Kaunas, Lithuania	69	Lithuania	2–1	2–2	UEFA Euro 2024 qualification
9	11 September 2023	Podgorica City Stadium, Podgorica, Montenegro	70	Bulgaria	1–0	2–1	UEFA Euro 2024 qualification

== Honours ==
BSK Borča

- Serbian First League: 2008–09

Partizan

- Serbian SuperLiga: 2010–11
- Serbian Cup: 2010–11

Manchester City

- Premier League: 2011–12
- FA Community Shield: 2012

Fiorentina

- Coppa Italia runner-up: 2013–14

Atlético Madrid

- La Liga: 2020–21
- UEFA Europa League: 2017–18
- UEFA Super Cup: 2018
- UEFA Champions League runner-up: 2015–16

Trabzonspor

- Turkish Cup: 2025–26; runner-up: 2024–25

Individual

- Serbian SuperLiga Team of the Season: 2010–11
- Montenegrin Footballer of the Year (7): 2016, 2017, 2018, 2020, 2021, 2022, 2023
