= Mirko Vučinić =

Montenegrin footballer (born 1983)

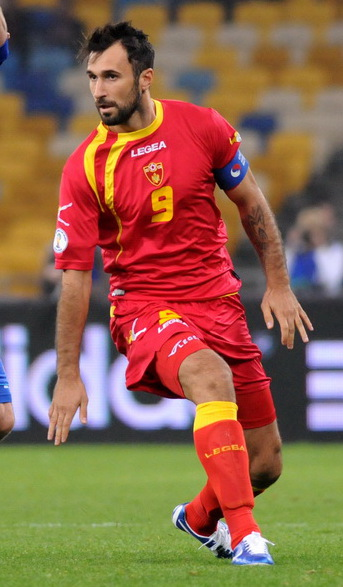
- Vučinić playing for Montenegro in 2012

Personal information
- Full name: Mirko Vučinić
- Date of birth: 1 October 1983 (age 43)
- Place of birth: Nikšić, SR Montenegro, SFR Yugoslavia
- Height: 1.87 m (6 ft 2 in)
- Position: Forward

Team information
- Current team: Montenegro (manager)

Youth career
- 1998–1999: Sutjeska Nikšić
- 2000–2002: Lecce

Senior career*
Years	Team	Apps	(Gls)
1999–2000	Sutjeska Nikšić	9	(3)
2000–2006	Lecce	111	(34)
2006–2011	Roma	147	(46)
2011–2014	Juventus	75	(21)
2014–2017	Al Jazira	29	(27)
Total		371	(131)

International career
2004–2006	Serbia and Montenegro U21	4	(3)
2005–2006	Serbia and Montenegro	3	(0)
2007–2017	Montenegro	46	(17)

Managerial career
- 2025–: Montenegro
- * Club domestic league appearances and goals

Mirko Vučinić (Montenegrin: Мирко Вучинић, pronounced [mǐːrko vǔtʃinitɕ]; born 1 October 1983) is a Montenegrin football manager and former player, who is the manager of the Montenegro national team. Quick, versatile, and physically strong, Vučinić was known for his creativity, technique, and intelligence as a footballer, as well as his powerful striking ability from distance.

Having caught the attention of Pantaleo Corvino, the sporting director of the Italian club Lecce, he transferred there in the summer of 2000. He played for Lecce as they moved between Serie A and B. His highest-scoring season was 2004–05, with 19 goals in 28 games in Serie A. In 2006, he joined Roma, where he won the Coppa Italia twice; he later moved on to Juventus in 2011, where he won three consecutive Serie A titles. In July 2014, he moved to Al Jazira on an undisclosed fee.

On the international stage, Vučinić played for the Serbia and Montenegro under-21 team. Due to injury, he was unable to represent Serbia and Montenegro at the FIFA World Cup in 2006. Following the split of Serbia and Montenegro in May 2006, Vučinić chose to represent his native Montenegro.

== Club career ==
=== Early career ===
Vučinić started out at his hometown club Sutjeska Nikšić before being snapped up by Lecce in Italy during the summer of 2000 at age 16. The man who initiated the transfer was the club's sporting director at the time, Pantaleo Corvino, who has since developed a reputation for having a good eye when it comes to football talent coming out of Eastern Europe.

In his fourth season for the club, 21-year-old Vučinić scored 19 goals in 28 Serie A games, including a hat-trick versus Lazio on 1 May 2005. Following that successful season, his progress came to a halt with only nine goals recorded in 31 games as his career stalled due to injury.

=== Roma ===
On 30 August 2006, Vučinić signed a one-year loan contract with Roma worth €3.25 million, with an option of buying 50% of his registration rights from Lecce at the season's conclusion for an additional €3.75 million. Vučinić signed a 1+4 year contract, which worth €1.07M, €1.6M, €1.8M in the first three seasons in gross annually, then increased to €2.1 million in the last two seasons.

==== 2006–07 season ====
During his first season in Rome, he did not feature much as he had operations on his left knee twice. Also, the presence of the European Golden Boot winner Francesco Totti as the lone forward of Roma's tactical formation under head coach Luciano Spalletti did not give Vučinić much playing time. Despite this, he succeeded in scoring three goals: his first goal for Roma in the 1–0 victory against Siena on 28 January 2007, his first goal in the UEFA Champions League during the quarter-finals match 2–1 victory against Manchester United on 4 April 2007. He also scored another Serie A away goal against Catania in a game that saw Roma beat the Sicilians 2–0.

==== 2007–08 season ====
At the beginning of the 2007–08 season, Roma paid Lecce the pre-agreed price of €3.75 million to sign 50 percent of Vučinić's rights. He decided to wear the No. 9 jersey, previously owned by Vincenzo Montella in the last eight seasons, and also stated that he would like to do the same that Montella did at Roma.

As Francesco Totti was usually deployed as a lone striker, Vučinić began to play as left winger in Luciano Spalletti's 4-2-3-1. He scored his first goal of the season in the 2–1 victory against Sporting CP, in the Champions League group stage, allowing Roma to get the vital goal to earn them three points.

In the following game, away to Milan at the San Siro, with Francesco Totti injured, Vučinić started as a striker and scored a header, from a cross by his teammate Cicinho. It was the only goal of the game as Roma picked up a win over their rival. This proved decisive again, as in the game against city rivals Lazio, Roma won 3–2, with Vučinić leaving his mark with a left-foot equaliser and an assist for Simone Perrotta's goal. Another decisive goal of Vučinić was a header against Real Madrid at the Santiago Bernabéu, securing a 2–1 win for his side as well as qualification to the successive round.

==== 2008–09 season ====
In June 2008, Roma finally bought Vučinić outright by paying Lecce €12 million, meaning Roma had paid €19 million in total to Lecce.

On 4 November 2008, he scored two goals in Roma's UEFA Champions League group stage match against Chelsea, emerging as 3–1 winners. Roma made it to the round of 16, where they lost to Arsenal on penalties, with Vučinić missing the target in the shootout with a weak shot down the middle that was easily saved by goalkeeper Manuel Almunia.

==== 2009–10 season ====
On 1 June 2009, Roma announced Vučinić had signed a new four-year contract, under which the gross wage of the 2008–09 season would increase to €3.3 million as well as €4 million in 2009–10 season; €4.2 million in the 2010–11 season; €4.5 million in 2011–12 season and €4.7 million in 2012–13 season. The 2009–10 Serie A campaign started off poorly for Roma, forcing head coach Luciano Spalletti to resign after two opening losses. Arrival of new head coach Claudio Ranieri initially failed to change matters with the team continuing to slide down the standings. Vučinić was booed by Roma fans in early November 2009 against Bologna when he finally scored his first goal of the season. After winning that match, however, Roma went on a 24-match unbeaten run in the league, mounting a credible title challenge by the end of the season, in large part thanks to Vučinić's improved form and steady goalscoring efforts that included a hat-trick versus Udinese and a brace in the win against heated crosstown rivals Lazio.

==== 2010–11 season ====
The 2010–11 season began well for Vučinić, scoring the injury-time winner against defending league champions Inter Milan. As the season progressed, however, he experienced a loss of form and his goals output dipped dramatically. Later in the season he was linked with a move to Tottenham.

The team was also going through turmoil as it was way off pace for the title after challenging for the Scudetto the previous few seasons. Head coach Ranieri was sacked and replaced with Vincenzo Montella. Vučinić's form didn't improve much as his loss of confidence became very evident in April when he missed open net sitters in two consecutive home matches – first in Serie A versus Palermo with the score tied at 1–1 (Roma eventually lost 3–2), and then three days later in the Coppa Italia semi-final first leg versus Inter (Roma lost 1–0).

=== Juventus ===
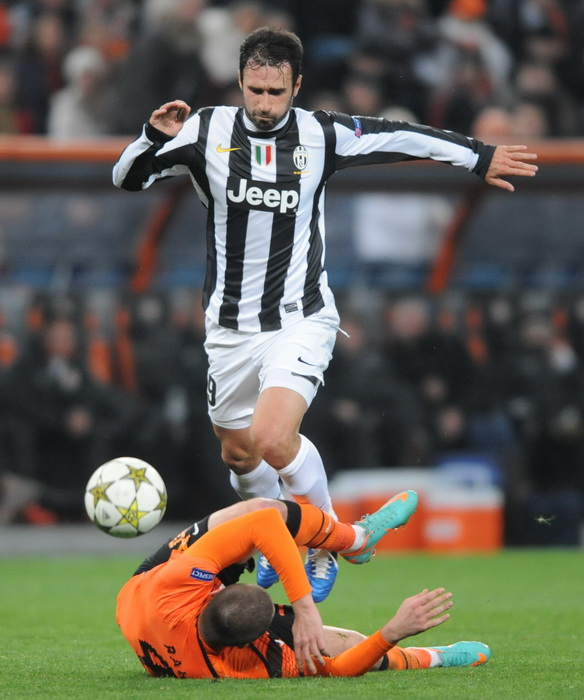
Vučinić in action for Juventus

==== 2011–12 season ====
On 30 July 2011, it was confirmed that Juventus had signed Vučinić for €15 million from Roma, with a 4-year deal worth a reported €3.5 million [in net] per year. He scored his first goal for the club on 21 August 2011 in the 2–1 defeat to AC Milan in the annual Trofeo Luigi Berlusconi curtain raiser to the Italian season.

Vučinić scored a 32-metre goal in extra time to help Juventus to a 2–2 draw against Milan on 20 March 2012, helping his side to a 4–3 victory on aggregate and progression to the 2012 Coppa Italia final.

==== 2012–13 season ====
The second season of Vučinić started exceptionally well, proving to be a vital player at several occasions. His first Serie A goal came during his second appearance against Udinese on 2 September 2012, the end of the year came soon after and his goal tally stood at 4 goals on 14 appearances and 4 assists. On 9 January 2013 Vučinić scored in the 96th minute against AC Milan to bring Juventus to the semi-finals of Coppa Italia where they will face Lazio. The new year started very well for the Montenegrin, as he managed to score once again against Udinese.

Vučinić gained notoriety on 5 April 2013 when after scoring a penalty kick goal against Pescara, he celebrated by taking off his shorts and was publicly seen in his briefs.

==== 2013–14 season ====
On 1 May 2014, in injury time of Juventus' Europa League semi-final elimination against Benfica, Vučinić was sent off for a fight with opponent Lazar Marković despite neither being on the field of play at the time, Marković having been substituted and Vučinić still on the substitutes bench.

=== Al Jazira ===
On 4 July 2014, Vučinić joined UAE Pro League side Al Jazira for an undisclosed fee believed to be in the region of €6 million. He enjoyed a first season of individual success, scoring 27 goals in 24 matches and finishing as top scorer of the league, but was troubled by injuries in the seasons following, amassing an additional nine appearances until his departure from the club in July 2017.

== International career ==
=== Serbia and Montenegro ===
Vučinić received his first call-up to the Serbia and Montenegro national team on 4 June 2005 for the FIFA World Cup qualifier against Belgium in Belgrade, which ended in a goalless draw, entering the game as a substitute for Nenad Jestrović in the 53rd minute. He made his second appearance four days later in a friendly match against Italy at the Rogers Centre in Toronto.

Vučinić was also a member of the Serbia and Montenegro national under-21 team that qualified for the 2006 UEFA European Under-21 Championship in great fashion, defeating Croatia 5–2 on aggregate in a two-leg playoff. In the first leg on 12 November 2005, Vučinić scored a hat-trick and celebrated with the Serbian three-finger salute.

On 14 May 2006, Vučinić was called up by Dragan Okuka to the under-21 side for the 2006 UEFA European Under-21 Championship. A day later, he was also called up by Ilija Petković to play for the senior Serbia and Montenegro side at the 2006 FIFA World Cup. At the Under-21 Championship, Vučinić stretched his knee ligaments in the opening group stage match against Germany on 23 May 2006. As a result, he could not participate in the World Cup and was replaced in the squad by Dušan Petković on 30 May 2006.

His last appearance for Serbia and Montenegro was a friendly against Tunisia on 1 March 2006.

=== Montenegro ===
After Montenegro became an independent country on 3 June 2006, and a new national team was to be established, Vučinić initially opted to play for the Serbia national football team, but eventually decided to play for his native country. In September 2006 in a press conference in Rome, according to La Gazzetta dello Sport, he said "I am one hundred percent Montenegrin and happy that the union with Serbia has ended".

He scored the first goal of Montenegro's history when he netted a penalty kick in the team's first international match on 24 March 2007, a 2–1 friendly win against Hungary. He has earned a total of 46 caps, scoring 17 goals. His final international was a June 2017 friendly against Iran.

In 2010, in a game against Switzerland, Vucinic gained notoriety after he scored the game's only goal when he took off his pants and ran around with the shorts on his head, showing off his underpants.

== Style of play ==
A quick, strong, talented, and technically gifted player that played with elegance and a perceived arrogance with his style of play, Vučinić was capable of both scoring and creating decisive goals for his team. He could fill any attacking position, but was often deployed as a winger on either flank, as a centre-forward, as a main striker, or even as a deep lying striker. Vučinić drew praise in the media for his vision, footballing intelligence, team play, and short passing accuracy, which allowed him to create chances for teammates and also made him an effective assist provider. His positioning and intelligent offensive movement enabled him to provide depth for his team and create space for teammates; while his creativity, dribbling skills, touch on the ball, and close control, combined with his strong physique, allowed him to retain possession under pressure, hold up the ball with his back to goal, and lay it off to his teammates. Due to his eye for goal, he was also well known for his ability to score powerful long-range goals with both feet. In spite of his height, however, he is not particularly strong in the air. Due to the skill he demonstrated in his youth, he earned the nickname "the Balkan Maradona". Despite his talent, however, he also drew criticism throughout his career for his attitude and unpredictability on the pitch, as well as his inconsistency. Vučinić's work-rate in big matches was also brought into question at times with critics pointing to his "lazy" playing style, which often frustrated fans.

== Golf career ==
In 2018, Vučinić began a golf career as a member of the Princess Milica Golf Club based in Tivat.

== Career statistics ==
=== Club ===
Appearances and goals by club, season and competition
Team	Season	League			National cup (Note: Includes Serbia and Montenegro Cup, Coppa Italia, UAE President's Cup)		League cup		Continental		Other		Total	
Team	Season	Division	Apps	Goals	Apps	Goals	Apps	Goals	Apps	Goals	Apps	Goals	Apps	Goals
Sutjeska Nikšić	1999–2000	FRY First League	9	3	1	1	—		—		—		10	4
Lecce	2000–01	Serie A	3	0	0	0	—		—		—		3	0
Lecce	2001–02	Serie A	7	0	2	0	—		—		—		9	0
Lecce	2002–03	Serie B	28	5	1	0	—		—		—		29	5
Lecce	2003–04	Serie A	12	1	1	0	—		—		—		13	1
Lecce	2004–05	Serie A	28	19	3	3	—		—		—		31	22
Lecce	2005–06	Serie A	34	9	0	0	—		—		—		34	9
Lecce	Total		111	34	7	3	—		—		—		119	37
Roma	2006–07	Serie A	25	2	2	0	—		6 (Note: Appearances in UEFA Champions League)	1	0	0	33	3
Roma	2007–08	Serie A	33	9	6	1	—		8	4	1 (Note: Appearance in Supercoppa Italiana)	0	48	14
Roma	2008–09	Serie A	27	11	2	2	—		8	3	1	1	38	17
Roma	2009–10	Serie A	34	14	4	2	—		8 (Note: Appearances in UEFA Europa League)	3	—		46	19
Roma	2010–11	Serie A	28	10	4	1	—		4	0	1	0	37	11
Roma	Total		147	46	18	6	—		34	11	3	1	202	64
Juventus	2011–12	Serie A	32	9	3	1	—		—		—		35	10
Juventus	2012–13	Serie A	31	10	3	1	—		8	2	1	1	43	14
Juventus	2013–14	Serie A	12	2	0	0	—		5	0	1	0	18	2
Juventus	Total		75	21	6	2	—		13	2	2	1	96	26
Al Jazira	2014–15	UAE Pro League	23	25	1	2	0	0	0	0	—		24	27
Al Jazira	2015–16	UAE Pro League	6	2	0	0	3 (Note: Appearances in UAE League Cup)	3	—		—		9	5
Al Jazira	Total		29	27	1	2	3	3	0	0	—		33	32
Career total			371	131	33	14	3	3	47	13	5	2	459	163

=== International ===
National team	Year	Apps	Goals
Serbia and Montenegro	2005	2	0
Serbia and Montenegro	2006	1	0
Total		3	0
Montenegro	2007	4	4
Montenegro	2008	7	2
Montenegro	2009	4	2
Montenegro	2010	7	3
Montenegro	2011	5	0
Montenegro	2012	5	2
Montenegro	2013	5	2
Montenegro	2014	3	1
Montenegro	2015	4	1
Montenegro	2016	0	0
Montenegro	2017	2	0
Total		46	17

International goals

Scores and results list Montenegro's goal tally first.

List of international goals scored by Mirko Vučinić
No.	Date	Venue	Cap	Opponent	Score	Result	Competition
1	24 March 2007	Podgorica City Stadium, Podgorica, Montenegro	1	Hungary	1–1	2–1	Friendly
2	22 August 2007	Podgorica City Stadium, Podgorica, Montenegro	2	Slovenia	1–0	1–1	Friendly
3	12 September 2007	Podgorica City Stadium, Podgorica, Montenegro	3	Sweden	1–0	1–2	Friendly
4	17 October 2007	A. Le Coq Arena, Tallinn, Estonia	4	Estonia	1–0	1–0	Friendly
5	6 September 2008	Podgorica City Stadium, Podgorica, Montenegro	8	Bulgaria	1–1	2–2	2010 FIFA World Cup qualification
6	15 October 2008	Stadio Via del Mare, Lecce, Italy	10	Italy	1–1	1–2	2010 FIFA World Cup qualification
7	9 September 2009	Podgorica City Stadium, Podgorica, Montenegro	14	Cyprus	1–0	1–0	2010 FIFA World Cup qualification
8	18 November 2009	Podgorica City Stadium, Podgorica, Montenegro	15	Belarus	1–0	1–0	Friendly
9	29 May 2010	Ullevaal Stadion, Oslo, Norway	18	Norway	1–1	1–2	Friendly
10	3 September 2010	Podgorica City Stadium, Podgorica, Montenegro	20	Wales	1–0	1–0	UEFA Euro 2012 qualifying
11	8 October 2010	Podgorica City Stadium, Podgorica, Montenegro	22	Switzerland	1–0	1–0	UEFA Euro 2012 qualifying
12	25 May 2012	King Baudouin Stadium, Brussels, Belgium	29	Belgium	1–0	2–2	Friendly
13	7 September 2012	Podgorica City Stadium, Podgorica, Montenegro	31	Poland	2–1	2–2	2014 FIFA World Cup qualification
14	22 March 2013	Zimbru Stadium, Chișinău, Moldova	33	Moldova	1–0	1–0	2014 FIFA World Cup qualification
15	14 August 2013	Torpedo Stadium, Zhodino, Belarus	36	Belarus	1–1	1–1	Friendly
16	8 September 2014	Podgorica City Stadium, Podgorica, Montenegro	38	Moldova	2–0	2–0	UEFA Euro 2016 qualifying
17	9 October 2015	Podgorica City Stadium, Podgorica, Montenegro	43	Austria	1–0	2–3	UEFA Euro 2016 qualifying

== Honours ==
Roma

- Coppa Italia: 2006–07, 2007–08
- Supercoppa Italiana: 2007

Juventus

- Serie A: 2011–12, 2012–13, 2013–14
- Supercoppa Italiana: 2012, 2013

Individual

- Montenegrin Footballer of the Year: 2006, 2007, 2008, 2010, 2011, 2012, 2013
- UAE Pro-League Top-scorer: 2014–15

Sporting positions
Preceded by None	Montenegro national football team captain 2007–2015	Succeeded by Stevan Jovetić
