= Stevan Jovetić =

Montenegrin footballer (born 1989)

Stevan Jovetić Стеван Јоветић
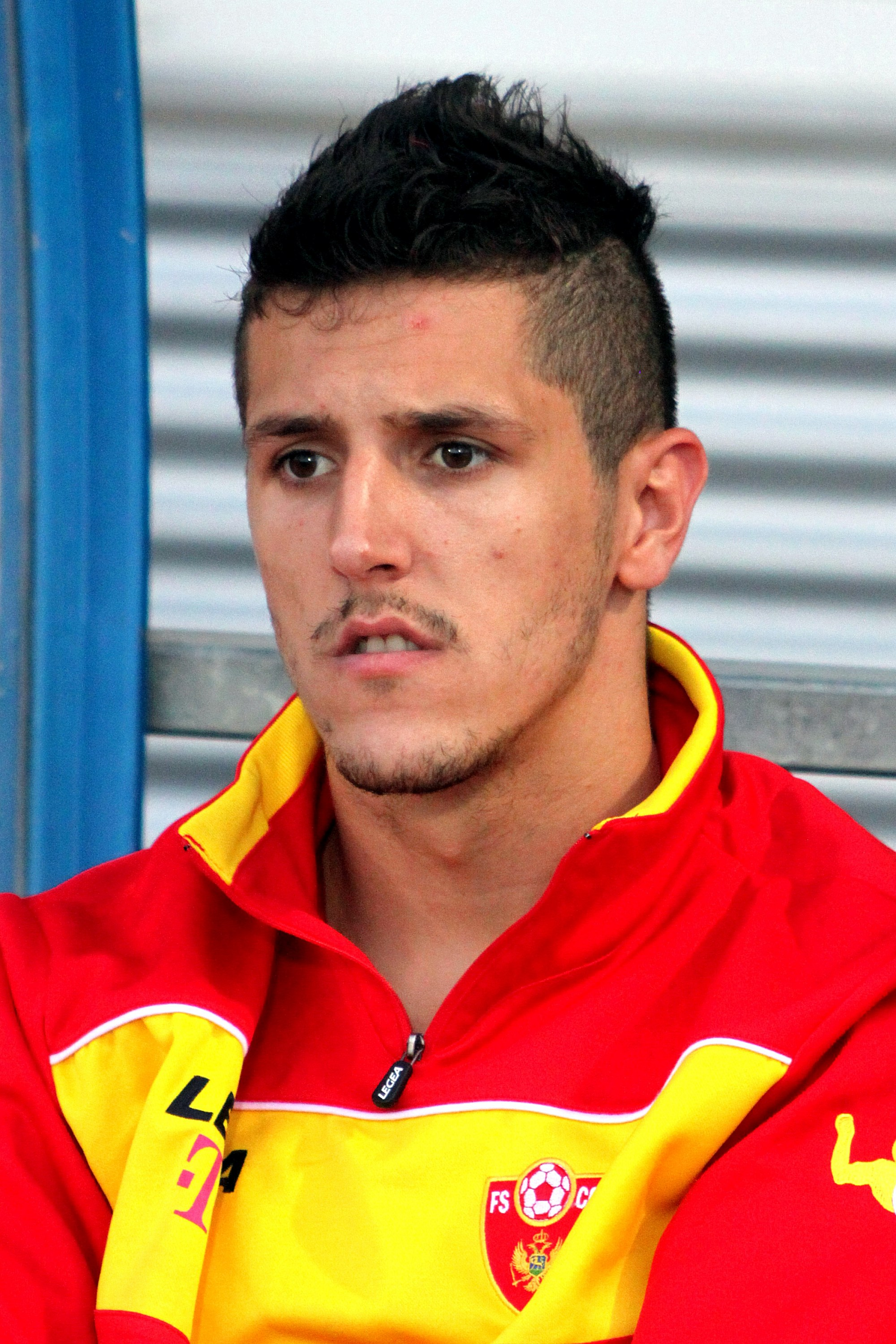
- Jovetić with Montenegro in 2014

Personal information
- Full name: Stevan Jovetić
- Date of birth: 2 November 1989 (age 37)
- Place of birth: Titograd, SR Montenegro, SFR Yugoslavia
- Height: 1.83 m (6 ft 0 in)
- Positions: Forward; attacking midfielder

Team information
- Current team: AEL Limassol
- Number: 9

Youth career
- –2004: Mladost Podgorica
- 2004–2006: Partizan

Senior career*
Years	Team	Apps	(Gls)
2006–2008	Partizan	51	(23)
2008–2013	Fiorentina	116	(35)
2013–2016	Manchester City	30	(8)
2015–2016	→ Inter Milan (loan)	26	(6)
2016–2017	Inter Milan	5	(0)
2017	→ Sevilla (loan)	21	(6)
2017–2021	Monaco	61	(18)
2021–2023	Hertha BSC	35	(10)
2023–2024	Olympiacos	21	(6)
2024–2026	Omonia	51	(11)
2026–	AEL Limassol	8	(1)

International career^{‡}
2005–2006	Serbia and Montenegro U17	9	(3)
2007	Montenegro U19	2	(1)
2007–2010	Montenegro U21	7	(2)
2007–	Montenegro	96	(37)
- * Club domestic league appearances and goals as of 13:06, 5 November 2026 (UTC) ‡ National team caps and goals as of 15 November 2026

Stevan Jovetić (Montenegrin: Стеван Јоветић, pronounced [stêʋaːn jǒʋetitɕ]; born 2 November 1989) is a Montenegrin professional footballer who plays as a forward for Cypriot First Division club AEL Limassol and captains the Montenegro national team.

Jovetić's primary position is a second striker, although he can also operate as an attacking midfielder or a winger. He is known for his dribbling, technical ability, and creativity, and his playing style has led to comparisons with Roberto Baggio.

Jovetić began his career with FK Partizan, winning the double of Serbian Superliga, and Serbian Cup in 2008, then joined ACF Fiorentina for an approximate €10.8 million. In five seasons at the Italian club, he scored 40 times in 134 matches, prompting an approximate €26.7 million transfer to Manchester City. In his first season in England, he won the League Cup and the Premier League. He subsequently returned to Italy to play for Inter Milan in 2015, and also had a loan spell in Spain with Sevilla in 2017, before joining Ligue 1 club Monaco later that year.

Jovetić is a Montenegro international, having previously represented his team at under-21 level. He made his senior international debut in 2007, in Montenegro's first international football match as an independent country. With 37 goals, he is Montenegro's all-time top goalscorer.

Jovetić is recognized as the second footballer to score at least a single goal in all of the "Big Five" leagues. He is one of the four professional football players (alongside Florin Răducioiu, Christian Poulsen, and Justin Kluivert) to have played in all of the top five European leagues. Jovetić is also known for his fair play, having never received a straight red card.

== Club career ==
Jovetic made his first football steps at Mladost Podgorica. He played for them until 2004 when he joined FK Partizan.

=== Partizan ===
On 9 April 2006, at the age of 16, Jovetić made his senior debut for FK Partizan under head coach Jürgen Röber during a league match against FK Voždovac.

He scored three goals during a UEFA Cup qualifying game against Zrinjski on 2 August 2007, in a 5–0 victory for Partizan, recording his first career hat-trick at only 17 years old. He became Partizan's club captain aged 17 years, 10 months and 21 days in January 2008, after former captain Antonio Rukavina was sold to German Bundesliga side Borussia Dortmund. This made him Partizan's youngest captain ever, surpassing Albert Nađ, who became captain at age 19. Jovetić held the record until 31 October 2012 when he was surpassed by Nikola Ninković.

=== Fiorentina ===
On 10 May 2008, Serie A club Fiorentina signed him for a fee of approx. €10.8 million. He scored his first goal for La Viola in the league match against Atalanta from the penalty spot on 5 April 2009.

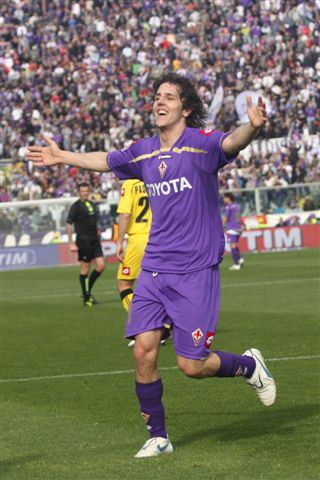
Jovetić playing for Fiorentina in 2010.

He started the 2009–10 season with a goal against Sporting CP in a 1–1 return leg draw at Stadio Artemio Franchi, which gave Fiorentina their entrance into the Champions League group stages. Other decisive goals included goals against Palermo, Sampdoria, and Livorno. On 29 September 2009, he scored both goals in a 2–0 victory over Liverpool in the Champions League group stage. On 9 March 2010, Jovetić scored two goals in Fiorentina's 3–2 win over Bayern Munich. The club lost, however, on away goals, and he also scored again against Napoli on 13 March. He scored in a 4–1 win against Udinese on 28 March.

During pre-season training for the 2010–11 season, he suffered an injury to his cruciate ligament in his right knee which eventually saw him out for the whole season.

Jovetić returned from injury in fine form in the 2011–12 season, scoring a double in a 3–0 win against Parma, his first goals in over a year. On 15 October 2011, Jovetić signed a contract that would keep him in Florence through 2016. Following the winter break in the Serie A, Jovetić netted twice as Fiorentina eased to a comfortable 3–0 victory over Novara on 8 January 2012. A month later, on 5 February, Jovetić earned his side a 3–2 victory against Udinese by converting two penalties; the win gave Fiorentina back-to-back victories in the Serie A for the first time all season. He failed to find the back of the net after this game for over two months before netting his side's opener, and then assisting the winning goal for Amauri as Fiorentina shocked title contenders Milan 2–1 on 7 April. Jovetić netted 14 times in 27 league games for Fiorentina, as the Tuscan side limped to 13th place in Serie A.

On 17 February 2013, both Jovetić, and teammate Adem Ljajić netted braces as Fiorentina thrashed Inter 4–1 at the Stadio Artemio Franchi.

=== Manchester City ===
On 19 July 2013, he signed for Premier League club Manchester City in a deal worth approx. €26.7 million. Upon signing for the club, Jovetić chose to wear number 35 on his shirt, which he also wore while playing for Partizan. He joined former Fiorentina teammate and close friend, Matija Nastasić at the club. He made his debut for Manchester City on 14 September, in a 0–0 draw away against Stoke City. He scored his first goals for the club on 24 September, in a 5–0 win against Wigan Athletic in the League Cup.

On 29 January 2014, Jovetić scored his first Premier League goal in a 5–1 win against Tottenham Hotspur at White Hart Lane. On 15 February, he scored his first FA Cup goal in a 2–0 victory over Chelsea in the fifth round. On 5 April, he scored his second goal in the Premier League in a 4–1 win over Southampton. On 7 May 2014, he scored his first league goal at the City of Manchester Stadium in Manchester City's 4–0 win over Aston Villa. In total, Jovetić scored 3 and assisted 1 in the premier league that season as he collected a winners medal for making 13 appearances in the league.

On 25 August 2014, he scored two goals in Manchester City's 3–1 home win over Liverpool. Upon missing time with injury, in February 2015, sanctions imposed by UEFA on City resulted in him being dropped from their UEFA Champions League squad and replaced by new signing Wilfried Bony. Jovetić reacted by saying "The manager has killed me with this decision" and questioned his future at the club.

=== Internazionale ===
In 2015 summer he returned to Italy, signing for Inter Milan on an 18-month loan, for €2.5 million fee, with a conditional obligation of redemption for €14.5 million, if Inter was ranked 17th or better in December 2016 or making an appearance for Inter in 2016–17 season. In his first 2 appearances, he scored 3 goals, with Inter winning both games. He went through a goal drought, which was broken against Udinese. Jovetić scored a brace against Udinese.

The conditional obligation to buy Jovetić was activated in July 2016.

For 2016–17 season, he was cut from the squad available for Europa League. De Boer and Pioli gave him 5 appearances.

==== Loan to Sevilla ====
On 10 January 2017, he signed a loan deal with Spanish team Sevilla until the end of season. He made his debut with the club on 12 January, scoring a goal in a 3–3 draw against Real Madrid in the Copa del Rey. He scored once again against Real Madrid three days later, this time in the league, coming on as a late substitute for Franco Vázquez, and securing the three points in stoppage time with the match-winning goal that put Sevilla back in second place in La Liga, and ended Real Madrid's 40-game-long unbeaten run in all competitions.

=== AS Monaco ===
On 29 August 2017, Monaco announced the signing of Jovetić on a four-year contract. After the departure of Kylian Mbappé on 31 August, Jovetić was assigned number 10 shirt. In his first season with Monaco he scored 10 goals in 21 matches in all competitions, averaging just above 50 minutes per game. During that season between 10 February and 16 March 2018 he had a streak of 5 consecutive matches with goals scored, among them the only brace (two goals in a single game) of the season against Angers SCO.

=== Hertha BSC ===
On 27 July 2021, Jovetić signed for Hertha BSC on a two-year contract. Becoming the third player (after Florin Răducioiu and Christian Poulsen) in history to play in all five of the big leagues (Germany, Spain, Italy, England and France). When he scored against 1. FC Köln on 14 August 2021, he became the second player, after Florin Răducioiu, to score at least one league goal in Europe's top five leagues.

=== Olympiacos ===
On 4 September 2023, Super League Greece club Olympiacos announced the signing of Jovetić. He reportedly signed a one-year contract with an option for a further year. Jovetić made his debut in the Super League Greece 4th-round game against AEK Athens which ended in a 1–1 draw. With Olympiacos, he won the 2023–24 UEFA Europa Conference League, his first European title, appearing as a substitute in a 1–0 extra-time victory over his former club Fiorentina in the final, on 29 May 2024.

=== Omonoia ===
On 30 September 2024, Jovetić joined Cypriot First Division club Omonoia as a free agent. In May 2026, he was part of the Omonoia squad that won the Cypriot First Division, the club's 22nd league title.

=== AEL Limassol ===
On 28 August 2026, Jovetić signed a two-year contract with AEL Limassol.

== International career ==
=== Serbia and Montenegro ===
Jovetić was part of the Serbia and Montenegro squad at the 2006 UEFA European Under-17 Championship. The team was eliminated in the group stage.

=== Montenegro ===
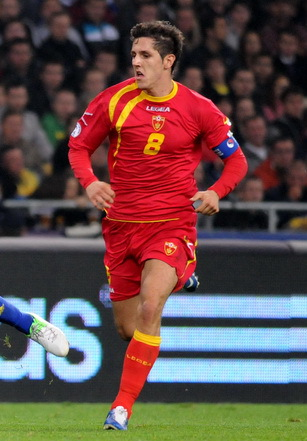
Jovetić playing for the Montenegro national football team in 2012.

Jovetić was a founding member of the Montenegro national team which played their first game against Hungary in March 2007, and was also a regular for the Montenegro U-21 team. Jovetić scored his first international goal against the same team, netting twice in a 3–3 friendly draw with Hungary on 20 August 2008 at the Puskás Ferenc Stadion in Budapest. He scored another brace on 29 February 2012 in his first match as captain when regular skipper Mirko Vučinić began on the bench, a 2–1 friendly home victory over Iceland.

On 15 October 2013 in a qualifier for the next year's World Cup, Jovetić scored his first competitive international brace, with an equalising penalty and an added-time goal at the Podgorica City Stadium, albeit in a 2–5 defeat to Moldova.

Jovetić equalised from a penalty on 14 November 2014 to earn Montenegro a 1–1 draw against Sweden in UEFA Euro 2016 qualifying.

== Style of play ==
Jovetić is a well-rounded forward, who is capable of playing anywhere along the front-line, and has been deployed as a main striker, as a winger, in a supporting role, or as an attacking midfielder, due to his ability to link-up with midfielders, and either score or create goals. A creative and technical striker, he is also known for his dribbling skills, mobility, and pace on the ball, as well as his ability to make attacking runs towards goal from deeper positions and strike well with both feet. Despite his talent, his playing time has often been limited by several injuries. His playing style, appearance, and hairstyle led him to be compared to Roberto Baggio during his time at Fiorentina, who had also played for the club.

== Personal life ==
Age 13, he moved from his hometown of Podgorica to Belgrade to play for FK Partizan's youth team. He stayed in Belgrade for four and a half years, and was then signed by Fiorentina (May 2008), living in Florence for 5 years until 2013, when he was signed by Manchester City.

His nickname in Montenegro is "Joveta". Fiorentina supporters gave Jovetić the nickname "Jo-Jo." His idols are former Roma forward and fellow Montenegrin international Mirko Vučinić, from whom he took the Montenegro U-21 captain's armband at the age of 17; and Andriy Shevchenko, who Jovetić emulated as a child.

He is a gamer, playing PlayStation, often with friend and former teammate Matija Nastasić. He has his left arm covered in tattoos (a "full-sleeve"). He has never consumed alcohol. His favourite team is FK Partizan. Jovetić is an Eastern Orthodox Christian.

== Career statistics ==
=== Club ===
As of match played 3 June 2026

Appearances and goals by club, season and competition
Club	Season	League			National cup (Note: Includes Serbian Cup, Coppa Italia, FA Cup, Copa del Rey, Coupe de France, DFB-Pokal, Greek Football Cup, Cypriot Cup)		League cup (Note: Includes Football League Cup, Coupe de la Ligue)		Continental		Other		Total	
Club	Season	Division	Apps	Goals	Apps	Goals	Apps	Goals	Apps	Goals	Apps	Goals	Apps	Goals
Partizan	2005–06	S&M SuperLiga	2	0	0	0	—		0	0	—		2	0
Partizan	2006–07	Serbian SuperLiga	22	1	4	3	—		0	0	—		26	4
Partizan	2007–08	Serbian SuperLiga	27	12	4	3	—		2 (Note: Appearances in UEFA Cup)	4	—		33	19
Partizan	Total		51	13	8	6	—		2	4	—		61	23
Fiorentina	2008–09	Serie A	29	2	1	0	—		5 (Note: Three appearances in UEFA Champions League, two appearances in UEFA Cup)	0	—		35	2
Fiorentina	2009–10	Serie A	29	6	2	0	—		6 (Note: Appearance(s) in UEFA Champions League)	5	—		37	11
Fiorentina	2010–11	Serie A	0	0	0	0	—		—		—		0	0
Fiorentina	2011–12	Serie A	27	14	2	0	—		—		—		29	14
Fiorentina	2012–13	Serie A	31	13	3	0	—		—		—		34	13
Fiorentina	Total		116	35	8	0	—		11	5	—		135	40
Manchester City	2013–14	Premier League	13	3	5	3	0	0	0	0	—		18	6
Manchester City	2014–15	Premier League	17	5	2	0	1	0	5	0	1 (Note: Appearance in FA Community Shield)	0	26	5
Manchester City	Total		30	8	7	3	1	0	5	0	1	0	44	11
Inter Milan (loan)	2015–16	Serie A	26	6	2	1	—		—		—		28	7
Inter Milan	2016–17	Serie A	5	0	0	0	—		0	0	—		5	0
Sevilla (loan)	2016–17	La Liga	21	6	1	1	—		2	0	—		24	7
Monaco	2017–18	Ligue 1	15	8	2	2	3	0	1	0	—		21	10
Monaco	2018–19	Ligue 1	8	2	0	0	—		1	0	1 (Note: Appearance in Trophée des Champions)	0	10	2
Monaco	2019–20	Ligue 1	9	2	4	0	—		—		—		13	2
Monaco	2020–21	Ligue 1	29	6	4	1	—		—		—		33	7
Monaco	Total		61	18	10	3	3	0	2	0	1	0	77	21
Hertha BSC	2021–22	Bundesliga	18	6	2	1	—		—		2 (Note: Appearances in Bundesliga relegation play-offs)	0	22	7
Hertha BSC	2022–23	Bundesliga	17	4	1	0	—		—		—		18	4
Hertha BSC	Total		35	10	3	1	—		—		2	0	40	11
Olympiacos	2023–24	Super League Greece	21	6	2	0	—		11 (Note: Four appearances in UEFA Europa League, seven appearances and two goals in UEFA Europa Conference League)	2	—		34	8
Omonia	2024–25	Cypriot First Division	27	7	2	0	—		2 (Note: Appearances in UEFA Conference League)	1	—		31	8
Omonia	2025–26	Cypriot First Division	24	4	2	0	—		9	5	—		35	9
Omonia	Total		51	11	4	0	—		11	6	—		66	17
Career total			417	113	45	15	4	0	40	15	4	0	510	145

=== International ===
As of match played 15 November 2026

Appearances and goals by national team and year
National team	Year	Apps	Goals
Montenegro	2007	1	0
Montenegro	2008	6	4
Montenegro	2009	6	2
Montenegro	2010	0	0
Montenegro	2011	6	1
Montenegro	2012	5	3
Montenegro	2013	6	2
Montenegro	2014	5	1
Montenegro	2015	5	3
Montenegro	2016	4	3
Montenegro	2017	5	5
Montenegro	2018	2	0
Montenegro	2019	0	0
Montenegro	2020	7	4
Montenegro	2021	4	3
Montenegro	2022	3	0
Montenegro	2023	9	3
Montenegro	2024	9	2
Montenegro	2025	7	1
Montenegro	2026	6	0
Total		96	37

As of match played 22 March 2025. Montenegro score listed first, score column indicates score after each Jovetić goal.

International goals by date, venue, cap, opponent, score, result and competition
No.	Date	Venue	Cap	Opponent	Score	Result	Competition
1	20 August 2008	Ferenc Puskás Stadium, Budapest, Hungary	3	Hungary	1–1	3–3	Friendly
2	20 August 2008	Ferenc Puskás Stadium, Budapest, Hungary	3	Hungary	3–2	3–3	Friendly
3	6 September 2008	Podgorica City Stadium, Podgorica, Montenegro	4	Bulgaria	2–1	2–2	2010 FIFA World Cup qualification
4	19 November 2008	Podgorica City Stadium, Podgorica, Montenegro	7	Macedonia	2–0	2–1	Friendly
5	12 August 2009	Podgorica City Stadium, Podgorica, Montenegro	10	Wales	1–0	2–1	Friendly
6	5 September 2009	Vasil Levski National Stadium, Sofia, Bulgaria	11	Bulgaria	1–0	1–4	2010 FIFA World Cup qualification
7	2 September 2011	Cardiff City Stadium, Cardiff, Wales	16	Wales	1–2	1–2	UEFA Euro 2012 qualifying
8	29 February 2012	Podgorica City Stadium, Podgorica, Montenegro	20	Iceland	1–0	2–1	Friendly
9	29 February 2012	Podgorica City Stadium, Podgorica, Montenegro	20	Iceland	2–1	2–1	Friendly
10	15 August 2012	Podgorica City Stadium, Podgorica, Montenegro	21	Latvia	1–0	2–0	Friendly
11	15 October 2013	Podgorica City Stadium, Podgorica, Montenegro	30	Moldova	1–1	2–5	2014 FIFA World Cup qualification
12	15 October 2013	Podgorica City Stadium, Podgorica, Montenegro	30	Moldova	2–5	2–5	2014 FIFA World Cup qualification
13	15 November 2014	Podgorica City Stadium, Podgorica, Montenegro	35	Sweden	1–1	1–1	UEFA Euro 2016 qualifying
14	8 June 2015	Viborg Stadion, Viborg, Denmark	37	Denmark	1–0	1–2	Friendly
15	5 September 2015	Podgorica City Stadium, Podgorica, Montenegro	38	Liechtenstein	2–0	2–0	UEFA Euro 2016 qualifying
16	12 November 2015	Philip II Arena, Skopje, Macedonia	40	Macedonia	4–1	4–1	Friendly
17	4 September 2016	Cluj Arena, Cluj-Napoca, Romania	41	Romania	1–1	1–1	2018 FIFA World Cup qualification
18	8 October 2016	Podgorica City Stadium, Podgorica, Montenegro	42	Kazakhstan	3–0	5–0	2018 FIFA World Cup qualification
19	11 November 2016	Vazgen Sargsyan Republican Stadium, Yerevan, Armenia	44	Armenia	2–0	2–3	2018 FIFA World Cup qualification
20	4 June 2017	Podgorica City Stadium, Podgorica, Montenegro	45	Iran	1–1	1–2	Friendly
21	10 June 2017	Podgorica City Stadium, Podgorica, Montenegro	46	Armenia	2–0	4–1	2018 FIFA World Cup qualification
22	10 June 2017	Podgorica City Stadium, Podgorica, Montenegro	46	Armenia	3–0	4–1	2018 FIFA World Cup qualification
23	10 June 2017	Podgorica City Stadium, Podgorica, Montenegro	46	Armenia	4–0	4–1	2018 FIFA World Cup qualification
24	4 September 2017	Podgorica City Stadium, Podgorica, Montenegro	48	Romania	1–0	1–0	2018 FIFA World Cup qualification
25	5 September 2020	GSP Stadium, Nicosia, Cyprus	52	Cyprus	1–0	2–0	2020–21 UEFA Nations League C
26	5 September 2020	GSP Stadium, Nicosia, Cyprus	52	Cyprus	2–0	2–0	2020–21 UEFA Nations League C
27	10 October 2020	Podgorica City Stadium, Podgorica, Montenegro	54	Azerbaijan	1–0	2–0	2020–21 UEFA Nations League C
28	17 November 2020	Podgorica City Stadium, Podgorica, Montenegro	58	Cyprus	1–0	4–0	2020–21 UEFA Nations League C
29	24 March 2021	Skonto Stadium, Riga, Latvia	59	Latvia	1–1	2–1	2022 FIFA World Cup qualification
30	24 March 2021	Skonto Stadium, Riga, Latvia	59	Latvia	2–1	2–1	2022 FIFA World Cup qualification
31	27 March 2021	Podgorica City Stadium, Podgorica, Montenegro	60	Gibraltar	4–1	4–1	2022 FIFA World Cup qualification
32	11 September 2023	Podgorica City Stadium, Podgorica, Montenegro	70	Bulgaria	2–1	2–1	UEFA Euro 2024 qualification
33	17 October 2023	Rajko Mitić Stadium, Belgrade, Serbia	72	Serbia	1–1	1–3	UEFA Euro 2024 qualification
34	16 November 2023	Podgorica City Stadium, Podgorica, Montenegro	73	Lithuania	2–0	2–0	UEFA Euro 2024 qualification
35	25 March 2024	Mardan Sports Complex, Antalya, Turkey	76	North Macedonia	1–0	1–0	Friendly
36	9 June 2024	Podgorica City Stadium, Podgorica, Montenegro	78	Georgia	1–2	1–3	Friendly
37	22 March 2025	Gradski stadion, Nikšić, Montenegro	84	Gibraltar	1–1	3–1	2026 FIFA World Cup qualification

== Honours ==
Partizan

- Serbian SuperLiga: 2007–08
- Serbian Cup: 2007–08

Manchester City

- Premier League: 2013–14
- EFL Cup: 2013–14

Olympiacos

- UEFA Conference League: 2023–24

Omonia

- Cypriot First Division: 2025–26

Individual

- Montenegrin Footballer of the Year: 2009, 2015
