= 2018 FIFA World Cup qualification – UEFA Group E =

The 2018 FIFA World Cup qualification UEFA Group E was one of the nine UEFA groups for 2018 FIFA World Cup qualification. The group consisted of six teams: Romania, Denmark, Poland, Montenegro, Armenia, and Kazakhstan.

The draw for the first round (group stage) was held as part of the 2018 FIFA World Cup Preliminary Draw on 25 July 2015, starting 18:00 MSK (UTC+3), at the Konstantinovsky Palace in Strelna, Saint Petersburg, Russia.

The group winners, Poland, qualified directly for the 2018 FIFA World Cup. The group runners-up, Denmark, advanced to the play-offs as one of the best eight runners-up.

== Standings ==
2018 FIFA World Cup qualification tiebreakers
In league format, the ranking of teams in each group was based on the following criteria (regulations Articles 20.6 and 20.7):
1. Points (3 points for a win, 1 point for a draw, 0 points for a loss)
2. Overall goal difference
3. Overall goals scored
4. Points in matches between tied teams
5. Goal difference in matches between tied teams
6. Goals scored in matches between tied teams
7. Away goals scored in matches between tied teams (if the tie was only between two teams in home-and-away league format)
8. Fair play points
  - first yellow card: minus 1 point
  - indirect red card (second yellow card): minus 3 points
  - direct red card: minus 4 points
  - yellow card and direct red card: minus 5 points
9. Drawing of lots by the FIFA Organising Committee

Pos	Team	Pld	W	D	L	GF	GA	GD	Pts	Qualification	Poland	Denmark	Montenegro	Romania	Armenia	Kazakhstan
1	Poland	10	8	1	1	28	14	+14	25	Qualification to 2018 FIFA World Cup	—	3–2	4–2	3–1	2–1	3–0
2	Denmark	10	6	2	2	20	8	+12	20	Advance to second round	4–0	—	0–1	1–1	1–0	4–1
3	Montenegro	10	5	1	4	20	12	+8	16		1–2	0–1	—	1–0	4–1	5–0
4	Romania	10	3	4	3	12	10	+2	13		0–3	0–0	1–1	—	1–0	3–1
5	Armenia	10	2	1	7	10	26	−16	7		1–6	1–4	3–2	0–5	—	2–0
6	Kazakhstan	10	0	3	7	6	26	−20	3		2–2	1–3	0–3	0–0	1–1	—

Source: FIFA
Rules for classification: Qualification tiebreakers

== Matches ==
The fixture list was confirmed by UEFA on 26 July 2015, the day following the draw. Times are CET/CEST, (Note: CET (UTC+1) for matches on 11 November 2016, and CEST (UTC+2) for all other matches.) as listed by UEFA (local times are in parentheses).

4 September 2016
18:00
(18:00 UTC+2)

Denmark	1–0	Armenia
Eriksen 17'	Report (FIFA); Report (UEFA)

Parken Stadium, Copenhagen
Attendance: 21,745
Referee: Harald Lechner (Austria)
4 September 2016
18:00
(22:00 UTC+6)

Kazakhstan	2–2	Poland
Khizhnichenko 51', 58'	Report (FIFA); Report (UEFA)	Kapustka 9'; Lewandowski 35' (pen.)

Astana Arena, Astana
Attendance: 19,905
Referee: Serdar Gözübüyük (Netherlands)
4 September 2016
20:45
(21:45 UTC+3)

Romania	1–1	Montenegro
Popa 85'	Report (FIFA); Report (UEFA)	Jovetić 87'

Cluj Arena, Cluj-Napoca
Attendance: 25,468
Referee: Anthony Taylor (England)

8 October 2016
18:00
(20:00 UTC+4)

Armenia	0–5	Romania
	Report (FIFA); Report (UEFA)	Stancu 4' (pen.); Popa 10'; Marin 12'; Stanciu 29'; Chipciu 60'

Vazgen Sargsyan Republican Stadium, Yerevan
Attendance: 5,500
Referee: Vladislav Bezborodov (Russia)
8 October 2016
18:00
(18:00 UTC+2)

Montenegro	5–0	Kazakhstan
Tomašević 24'; Vukčević 59'; Jovetić 64'; Bećiraj 73'; Savić 78'	Report (FIFA); Report (UEFA)

City Stadium, Podgorica
Attendance: 8,517
Referee: Robert Schörgenhofer (Austria)
8 October 2016
20:45
(20:45 UTC+2)

Poland	3–2	Denmark
Lewandowski 20', 36' (pen.), 48'	Report (FIFA); Report (UEFA)	Glik 49' (o.g.); Poulsen 69'

Stadion Narodowy, Warsaw
Attendance: 56,811
Referee: Gianluca Rocchi (Italy)

11 October 2016
18:00
(22:00 UTC+6)

Kazakhstan	0–0	Romania
	Report (FIFA); Report (UEFA)

Astana Arena, Astana
Attendance: 12,346
Referee: Jorge Sousa (Portugal)
11 October 2016
20:45
(20:45 UTC+2)

Denmark	0–1	Montenegro
	Report (FIFA); Report (UEFA)	Bećiraj 32'

Parken Stadium, Copenhagen
Attendance: 20,852
Referee: Alberto Undiano Mallenco (Spain)
11 October 2016
20:45
(20:45 UTC+2)

Poland	2–1	Armenia
Mkoyan 48' (o.g.); Lewandowski 90+5'	Report (FIFA); Report (UEFA)	Pizzelli 50'

Stadion Narodowy, Warsaw
Attendance: 44,786
Referee: Ivan Kružliak (Slovakia)

11 November 2016
18:00
(21:00 UTC+4)

Armenia	3–2	Montenegro
A. Grigoryan 50'; Haroyan 74'; Ghazaryan 90+3'	Report (FIFA); Report (UEFA)	Kojašević 36'; Jovetić 38'

Vazgen Sargsyan Republican Stadium, Yerevan
Attendance: 3,500
Referee: Pavel Královec (Czech Republic)
11 November 2016
20:45
(20:45 UTC+1)

Denmark	4–1	Kazakhstan
Cornelius 15'; Eriksen 36' (pen.), 90+2'; Ankersen 78'	Report (FIFA); Report (UEFA)	Suyumbayev 17'

Parken Stadium, Copenhagen
Attendance: 18,901
Referee: Alon Yefet (Israel)
11 November 2016
20:45
(21:45 UTC+2)

Romania	0–3	Poland
	Report (FIFA); Report (UEFA)	Grosicki 11'; Lewandowski 83', 90+1' (pen.)

Arena Națională, Bucharest
Attendance: 48,531
Referee: Damir Skomina (Slovenia)

26 March 2017
18:00
(20:00 UTC+4)

Armenia	2–0	Kazakhstan
Mkhitaryan 73'; Özbiliz 75'	Report (FIFA); Report (UEFA)

Vazgen Sargsyan Republican Stadium, Yerevan
Attendance: 11,500
Referee: Aleksandar Stavrev (Macedonia)
26 March 2017
20:45
(20:45 UTC+2)

Montenegro	1–2	Poland
Mugoša 63'	Report (FIFA); Report (UEFA)	Lewandowski 40'; Piszczek 82'

City Stadium, Podgorica
Attendance: 10,439
Referee: Viktor Kassai (Hungary)
26 March 2017
20:45
(21:45 UTC+3)

Romania	0–0	Denmark
	Report (FIFA); Report (UEFA)

Cluj Arena, Cluj-Napoca (Note: Romania were sanctioned by FIFA to play one home match (against Denmark on 26 March 2017) away from Arena Națională, Bucharest due to a series of incidents during their home match against Poland, with a possible ban on a second match subject to a probation period of two years.)
Attendance: 26,895
Referee: Martin Atkinson (England)

10 June 2017
18:00
(22:00 UTC+6)

Kazakhstan	1–3	Denmark
Kuat 76'	Report (FIFA); Report (UEFA)	N. Jørgensen 27'; Eriksen 51' (pen.); Dolberg 81'

Almaty Central Stadium, Almaty
Attendance: 19,065
Referee: Vladislav Bezborodov (Russia)
10 June 2017
20:45
(20:45 UTC+2)

Montenegro	4–1	Armenia
Bećiraj 2'; Jovetić 28', 54', 82'	Report (FIFA); Report (UEFA)	Koryan 89'

City Stadium, Podgorica
Attendance: 6,861
Referee: Kevin Blom (Netherlands)
10 June 2017
20:45
(20:45 UTC+2)

Poland	3–1	Romania
Lewandowski 29' (pen.), 57', 62' (pen.)	Report (FIFA); Report (UEFA)	Stancu 77'

Stadion Narodowy, Warsaw
Attendance: 57,128
Referee: Ruddy Buquet (France)

1 September 2017
18:00
(22:00 UTC+6)

Kazakhstan	0–3	Montenegro
	Report (FIFA); Report (UEFA)	Vešović 31'; Bećiraj 53'; Simić 63'

Astana Arena, Astana
Attendance: 16,511
Referee: Sébastien Delferière (Belgium)
1 September 2017
20:45
(20:45 UTC+2)

Denmark	4–0	Poland
Delaney 15'; Cornelius 42'; Jørgensen 59'; Eriksen 80'	Report (FIFA); Report (UEFA)

Parken Stadium, Copenhagen
Attendance: 34,505
Referee: Milorad Mažić (Serbia)
1 September 2017
20:45
(21:45 UTC+3)

Romania	1–0	Armenia
Maxim 90+1'	Report (FIFA); Report (UEFA)

Arena Națională, Bucharest
Attendance: 27,178
Referee: Ivan Bebek (Croatia)

4 September 2017
18:00
(20:00 UTC+4)

Armenia	1–4	Denmark
Koryan 6'	Report (FIFA); Report (UEFA)	Delaney 16', 81', 90+3'; Eriksen 29'

Vazgen Sargsyan Republican Stadium, Yerevan
Attendance: 6,800
Referee: Bobby Madden (Scotland)
4 September 2017
20:45
(20:45 UTC+2)

Montenegro	1–0	Romania
Jovetić 75'	Report (FIFA); Report (UEFA)

City Stadium, Podgorica
Attendance: 9,452
Referee: Craig Thomson (Scotland)
4 September 2017
20:45
(20:45 UTC+2)

Poland	3–0	Kazakhstan
Milik 11'; Glik 74'; Lewandowski 86' (pen.)	Report (FIFA); Report (UEFA)

Stadion Narodowy, Warsaw
Attendance: 56,963
Referee: Andris Treimanis (Latvia)

5 October 2017
18:00
(20:00 UTC+4)

Armenia	1–6	Poland
Hambardzumyan 39'	Report (FIFA); Report (UEFA)	Grosicki 2'; Lewandowski 18', 25', 64'; Błaszczykowski 58'; Wolski 89'

Vazgen Sargsyan Republican Stadium, Yerevan
Attendance: 5,478
Referee: Matej Jug (Slovenia)
5 October 2017
20:45
(20:45 UTC+2)

Montenegro	0–1	Denmark
	Report (FIFA); Report (UEFA)	Eriksen 16'

City Stadium, Podgorica
Attendance: 10,779
Referee: Björn Kuipers (Netherlands)
5 October 2017
20:45
(21:45 UTC+3)

Romania	3–1	Kazakhstan
Budescu 33', 38' (pen.); Keșerü 73'	Report (FIFA); Report (UEFA)	Turysbek 82'

Ilie Oană Stadium, Ploiești (Note: Romania were sanctioned by FIFA to play one home match (against Kazakhstan on 5 October 2017) away from Arena Națională, Bucharest due to a series of incidents during their home match against Armenia.)
Attendance: 10,123
Referee: Sandro Schärer (Switzerland)

8 October 2017
18:00
(18:00 UTC+2)

Denmark	1–1	Romania
Eriksen 59' (pen.)	Report (FIFA); Report (UEFA)	Deac 88'

Parken Stadium, Copenhagen
Attendance: 36,084
Referee: Deniz Aytekin (Germany)
8 October 2017
18:00
(22:00 UTC+6)

Kazakhstan	1–1	Armenia
Turysbek 62'	Report (FIFA); Report (UEFA)	Mkhitaryan 26'

Astana Arena, Astana
Attendance: 12,158
Referee: Alexandru Tean (Moldova)
8 October 2017
18:00
(18:00 UTC+2)

Poland	4–2	Montenegro
Mączyński 6'; Grosicki 16'; Lewandowski 86'; Stojković 89' (o.g.)	Report (FIFA); Report (UEFA)	Mugoša 78'; Tomašević 83'

Stadion Narodowy, Warsaw
Attendance: 57,538
Referee: Daniele Orsato (Italy)

== Goalscorers ==
There were 96 goals scored in 30 matches, for an average of 3.2 goals per match.

16 goals

- (Poland) Robert Lewandowski

8 goals

- (Denmark) Christian Eriksen

7 goals

- (Montenegro) Stevan Jovetić

4 goals

- (Denmark) Thomas Delaney
- (Montenegro) Fatos Bećiraj

3 goals

- (Poland) Kamil Grosicki

2 goals

- (Armenia) Ruslan Koryan
- (Armenia) Henrikh Mkhitaryan
- (Denmark) Andreas Cornelius
- (Denmark) Nicolai Jørgensen
- (Kazakhstan) Sergei Khizhnichenko
- (Kazakhstan) Bauyrzhan Turysbek
- (Montenegro) Stefan Mugoša
- (Montenegro) Žarko Tomašević
- (Romania) Constantin Budescu
- (Romania) Adrian Popa
- (Romania) Bogdan Stancu

1 goal

- (Armenia) Gevorg Ghazaryan
- (Armenia) Artak Grigoryan
- (Armenia) Hovhannes Hambardzumyan
- (Armenia) Varazdat Haroyan
- (Armenia) Aras Özbiliz
- (Armenia) Marcos Pizzelli
- (Denmark) Peter Ankersen
- (Denmark) Kasper Dolberg
- (Denmark) Yussuf Poulsen
- (Kazakhstan) Islambek Kuat
- (Kazakhstan) Gafurzhan Suyumbayev
- (Montenegro) Damir Kojašević
- (Montenegro) Stefan Savić
- (Montenegro) Marko Simić
- (Montenegro) Marko Vešović
- (Montenegro) Nikola Vukčević
- (Poland) Jakub Błaszczykowski
- (Poland) Kamil Glik
- (Poland) Bartosz Kapustka
- (Poland) Krzysztof Mączyński
- (Poland) Arkadiusz Milik
- (Poland) Łukasz Piszczek
- (Poland) Rafał Wolski
- (Romania) Alexandru Chipciu
- (Romania) Ciprian Deac
- (Romania) Claudiu Keșerü
- (Romania) Răzvan Marin
- (Romania) Alexandru Maxim
- (Romania) Nicolae Stanciu

1 own goal

- (Armenia) Hrayr Mkoyan (against Poland)
- (Montenegro) Filip Stojković (against Poland)
- (Poland) Kamil Glik (against Denmark)

== Discipline ==
A player was automatically suspended for the next match for the following offences:

- Receiving a red card (red card suspensions could be extended for serious offences)
- Receiving two yellow cards in two different matches (yellow card suspensions were carried forward to the play-offs, but not the finals or any other future international matches)

The following suspensions were served during the qualifying matches:

Player	Team	Offence(s)	Suspended for match(es)
Gor Malakyan	Armenia	(red card) vs Romania (8 October 2016)	vs Poland (11 October 2016)
Bauyrzhan Islamkhan	Kazakhstan	(yellow card) vs Poland (4 September 2016); (yellow card) vs Montenegro (8 October 2016)	vs Romania (11 October 2016)
Gaël Andonian	Armenia	(yellow card) (yellow-red card) vs Poland (11 October 2016)	vs Montenegro (11 November 2016)
Islambek Kuat	Kazakhstan	(yellow card) vs Poland (4 September 2016); (yellow card) vs Romania (11 October 2016)	vs Denmark (11 November 2016)
Thiago Cionek	Poland	(yellow card) vs Denmark (8 October 2016); (yellow card) vs Armenia (11 October 2016)	vs Romania (11 November 2016)
Yeldos Akhmetov	Kazakhstan	(yellow card) vs Poland (4 September 2016); (yellow card) vs Denmark (11 November 2016)	vs Armenia (26 March 2017)
Florin Andone	Romania	(yellow card) vs Montenegro (4 September 2016); (yellow card) vs Poland (11 November 2016)	vs Denmark (26 March 2017)
Varazdat Haroyan	Armenia	(yellow card) vs Montenegro (11 November 2016); (yellow card) vs Kazakhstan (26 March 2017)	vs Montenegro (10 June 2017)
Andreas Cornelius	Denmark	(yellow card) vs Kazakhstan (11 November 2016); (yellow card) vs Romania (26 March 2017)	vs Kazakhstan (10 June 2017)
Serhiy Malyi	Kazakhstan	(yellow card) (yellow-red card) vs Armenia (26 March 2017)	vs Denmark (10 June 2017)
Marko Vešović	Montenegro	(yellow card) vs Denmark (11 October 2016); (yellow card) vs Poland (26 March 2017)	vs Armenia (10 June 2017)
Kamil Glik	Poland	(yellow card) vs Kazakhstan (4 September 2016); (yellow card) vs Montenegro (26 March 2017)	vs Romania (10 June 2017)
Artak Grigoryan	Armenia	(yellow card) vs Romania (8 October 2016); (yellow card) vs Montenegro (10 June 2017)	vs Romania (1 September 2017)
Bauyrzhan Islamkhan	Kazakhstan	(red card) vs Denmark (10 June 2017)	vs Montenegro (1 September 2017) vs Poland (4 September 2017) vs Romania (5 October 2017)
Cristian Săpunaru	Romania	(yellow card) vs Poland (11 November 2016); (yellow card) vs Poland (10 June 2017)	vs Armenia (1 September 2017)
Taron Voskanyan	Armenia	(yellow card) (yellow-red card) vs Romania (1 September 2017)	vs Denmark (4 September 2017)
Marko Simić	Montenegro	(yellow card) vs Romania (4 September 2016); (yellow card) vs Kazakhstan (1 September 2017)	vs Romania (4 September 2017)
Mihai Pintilii	Romania	(yellow card) vs Denmark (26 March 2017); (yellow card) vs Armenia (1 September 2017)	vs Montenegro (4 September 2017)
Gaël Andonian	Armenia	(yellow card) vs Poland (11 October 2016); (yellow card) vs Denmark (4 September 2017)	vs Poland (5 October 2017)
Varazdat Haroyan	Armenia	(yellow card) vs Romania (1 September 2017); (yellow card) vs Denmark (4 September 2017)	vs Poland (5 October 2017)
Yuriy Logvinenko	Kazakhstan	(yellow card) vs Denmark (10 June 2017); (yellow card) vs Poland (4 September 2017)	vs Romania (5 October 2017)
Fatos Bećiraj	Montenegro	(yellow card) vs Kazakhstan (8 October 2016); (yellow card) vs Romania (4 September 2017)	vs Denmark (5 October 2017)
Cosmin Moți	Romania	(yellow card) vs Montenegro (4 September 2016); (yellow card) vs Montenegro (4 September 2017)	vs Kazakhstan (5 October 2017)
Islambek Kuat	Kazakhstan	(yellow card) vs Poland (4 September 2017); (yellow card) vs Romania (5 October 2017)	vs Armenia (8 October 2017)
Serhiy Malyi	Kazakhstan	(yellow card) vs Armenia (26 March 2017); (yellow card) vs Romania (5 October 2017)	vs Armenia (8 October 2017)
Gafurzhan Suyumbayev	Kazakhstan	(yellow card) vs Poland (4 September 2017); (yellow card) vs Romania (5 October 2017)	vs Armenia (8 October 2017)
Stefan Savić	Montenegro	(yellow card) vs Poland (26 March 2017); (yellow card) vs Denmark (5 October 2017)	vs Poland (8 October 2017)
Marko Vešović	Montenegro	(yellow card) vs Romania (4 September 2017); (yellow card) vs Denmark (5 October 2017)	vs Poland (8 October 2017)
Romario Benzar	Romania	(yellow card) vs Poland (11 November 2016); (yellow card) vs Kazakhstan (5 October 2017)	vs Denmark (8 October 2017)
Alexandru Chipciu	Romania	(yellow card) vs Montenegro (4 September 2017); (yellow card) vs Kazakhstan (5 October 2017)	vs Denmark (8 October 2017)
