= 2014–15 in English football =

Football in England
- Season: 2014–15

Men's football
- Premier League: Chelsea
- Championship: AFC Bournemouth
- League One: Bristol City
- League Two: Burton Albion
- Conference Premier: Barnet
- FA Cup: Arsenal
- League Cup: Chelsea
- Community Shield: Arsenal

Women's football
- WSL 1: Chelsea
- WSL 2: Reading
- FA Women's Premier League: Sheffield
- Women's FA Cup: Chelsea
- WSL Cup: Arsenal

The 2014–15 season was the 135th season of competitive association football in England.

== Promotion and relegation ==
=== Pre-season ===
League Division	Promoted to league ▲	Relegated from league ▼
Premier League	Leicester City ▲; Burnley ▲; Queens Park Rangers ▲	Norwich City ▼; Fulham ▼; Cardiff City ▼
Championship	Wolverhampton Wanderers ▲; Brentford ▲; Rotherham United ▲	Doncaster Rovers ▼; Barnsley ▼; Yeovil Town ▼
League One	Chesterfield ▲; Scunthorpe United ▲; Rochdale ▲; Fleetwood Town ▲	Carlisle United ▼; Tranmere Rovers ▼; Shrewsbury Town ▼; Stevenage ▼
League Two	Luton Town ▲; Cambridge United ▲	Bristol Rovers ▼; Torquay United ▼

== National teams ==
=== England national football team ===
==== UEFA Euro 2016 qualifying ====
Pos	Team	Pld	W	D	L	GF	GA	GD	Pts	Qualification	(England)	(Switzerland)	(Slovenia)	(Estonia)	(Lithuania)	(San Marino)
1	England	10	10	0	0	31	3	+28	30	Qualify for final tournament	—	2–0	3–1	2–0	4–0	5–0
2	Switzerland	10	7	0	3	24	8	+16	21	Qualify for final tournament	0–2	—	3–2	3–0	4–0	7–0
3	Slovenia	10	5	1	4	18	11	+7	16	Advance to play-offs	2–3	1–0	—	1–0	1–1	6–0
4	Estonia	10	3	1	6	4	9	−5	10 (Note: Tied on head-to-head results. Overall goal difference was used as the tiebreaker.)		0–1	0–1	1–0	—	1–0	2–0
5	Lithuania	10	3	1	6	7	18	−11	10		0–3	1–2	0–2	1–0	—	2–1
6	San Marino	10	0	1	9	1	36	−35	1		0–6	0–4	0–2	0–0	0–2	—

Source: UEFA
Rules for classification: Qualification tiebreakers
Notes:

8 September 2014 UEFA Euro 2016 qualifying Group E	Switzerland	0–2	England	Basel
19:45 BST		Report	Welbeck 58', 90+4'	Stadium: St. Jakob-Park; Attendance: 35,500; Referee: Cüneyt Çakir (Turkey)

9 October 2014 UEFA Euro 2016 qualifying Group E	England	5–0	San Marino	Wembley, London
19:45 BST	Jagielka 25'; Milner (yellow card) 38'; Rooney 43' (pen.); Welbeck 49'; Townsend 72'; Della Valle 78' (o.g.)	Summary	Selva (yellow card) 43'; Rinaldi (yellow card) 90'	Stadium: Wembley Stadium; Attendance: 55,990; Referee: Marcin Borski (Poland)

12 October 2014 UEFA Euro 2016 qualifying Group E	Estonia	0–1	England	Tallinn
17:00 BST	Klavan (yellow card) 29' (yellow-red card) 48'	Summary	Baines (yellow card) 45+1'; Henderson (yellow card) 53'; Rooney 73'; Wilshere (yellow card) 87'	Stadium: A. Le Coq Arena; Attendance: 10,195; Referee: Marijo Strahonja (Croatia)

15 November 2014 UEFA Euro 2016 qualifying Group E	England	3–1	Slovenia	Wembley, London
17:00 GMT	Gibbs (yellow card) 52'; Rooney 59' (pen.); Welbeck 66', 72'; Clyne (yellow card) 79'; Sterling (yellow card) 82'; Jagielka (yellow card) 88'	Summary	Henderson 58' (o.g.); Cesar (yellow card) 58'	Stadium: Wembley Stadium; Attendance: 82,305; Referee: Olegário Benquerença (Portugal)

27 March 2015 UEFA Euro 2016 qualifying Group E	England	4–0	Lithuania	Wembley, London
19:45 GMT	Rooney 7'; Welbeck 45'; Sterling 58' (yellow card) 80'; Kane 73'	Report	Žaliūkas (yellow card) 41'; Kazlauskas (yellow card) 90+1'	Stadium: Wembley Stadium; Attendance: 83,671; Referee: Pavel Královec (Czech Republic)

==== International Friendlies ====
3 September 2014 Friendly	England	1–0	Norway	Wembley, London
20:00 BST	Rooney 68' (pen.)	Report		Stadium: Wembley Stadium; Attendance: 40,181; Referee: Jorge Sousa

18 November 2014 Friendly	Scotland	1–3	England	Glasgow, Scotland
20:00 BST	Robertson 83'	Report	Oxlade-Chamberlain 32'; Rooney 47', 85'	Stadium: Celtic Park; Attendance: 55,000; Referee: Jonas Eriksson

31 March 2015 Friendly	Italy	1–1	England	Turin, Italy
19:45 BST	Pellè 29'	Report	Townsend 79'	Stadium: Juventus Stadium; Attendance: 31,138; Referee: Felix Brych

=== England women's national football team ===
==== 2015 FIFA Women's World Cup qualification (UEFA) ====
Pos	Team	Pld	W	D	L	GF	GA	GD	Pts	Qualification	England	Ukraine	Wales	Turkey	Belarus	Montenegro
1	England	10	10	0	0	52	1	+51	30	Women's World Cup	—	4–0	2–0	8–0	6–0	9–0
2	Ukraine	10	7	1	2	34	9	+25	22	Play-offs	1–2	—	1–0	8–0	8–0	7–0
3	Wales	10	6	1	3	18	9	+9	19		0–4	1–1	—	1–0	1–0	4–0
4	Turkey	10	4	0	6	12	31	−19	12		0–4	0–1	1–5	—	3–0	3–1
5	Belarus	10	2	0	8	12	31	−19	6		0–3	1–3	0–3	1–2	—	3–1
6	Montenegro	10	0	0	10	6	53	−47	0		0–10	1–4	0–3	2–3	1–7	—

Source: UEFA
Rules for classification: Tiebreakers

14 June 2014 2015 FIFA Women's World Cup qualification	Belarus	0–3	England	Minsk, Belarus
15:00 BST	Avkhimovich (yellow card) 88'	Report	Aluko 31'; Houghton 36'; Dowie (yellow card) 66'; Bronze 90+5'	Stadium: Traktar Stadium; Attendance: 350; Referee: (Czech Republic) Jana Adamkova

19 June 2014 2015 FIFA Women's World Cup qualification	Ukraine	1–2	England	Lviv, Ukraine
19:00 BST	Vasylyuk (yellow card) 59'; Olha Ovdiychuk 63'	Report	Stoney 11'; Aluko 14'; Bronze (yellow card) 53'; Bassett (yellow card) 62'	Stadium: Arena Lviv; Attendance: 3,757; Referee: (Romania) Cristina Dorcioman

21 August 2014 2015 FIFA Women's World Cup qualification	Wales	0–4	England	Cardiff
19 BST		Summary	Carney 16'; Aluko 39'; Bassett 44'; Sanderson 45'	Stadium: Cardiff City Stadium; Referee: (Greece) Efthalia Mitsi

17 September 2014 2015 FIFA Women's World Cup qualification	Montenegro	0–10	England	Petrovac, Budva
19:00 BST	Armisa Kuć (yellow card) 80'; Irena Bjelica (yellow card) 84' (red card) 86'	Summary	Aluko 8', 31', 64'; Carney 22', 51'; Bronze 37'; Scott (yellow card) 52'; Duggan 56', 90+4'; Williams (yellow card) 79'; Greenwood 90'; Potter 90+3'	Stadium: Stadion Pod Malim Brdom; Attendance: 300; Referee: (Slovakia) Petra Chuda

== UEFA competitions ==
=== 2014–15 UEFA Champions League ===
==== Play-off round ====
Team 1	Agg.	Team 2	1st leg	2nd leg
Beşiktaş (Turkey)	0–1	(England) Arsenal	0–0	0–1

==== Group stage ====
===== Group B =====
Pos	Team	Pld	W	D	L	GF	GA	GD	Pts	Qualification	RMA	BSL	LIV	LUD
1	(Spain) Real Madrid	6	6	0	0	16	2	+14	18	Advance to knockout phase	—	5–1	1–0	4–0
2	(Switzerland) Basel	6	2	1	3	7	8	−1	7	Advance to knockout phase	0–1	—	1–0	4–0
3	(England) Liverpool	6	1	2	3	5	9	−4	5	Transfer to Europa League	0–3	1–1	—	2–1
4	(Bulgaria) Ludogorets Razgrad	6	1	1	4	5	14	−9	4		1–2	1–0	2–2	—

Source: UEFA

===== Group D =====
Pos	Team	Pld	W	D	L	GF	GA	GD	Pts	Qualification	DOR	ARS	AND	GAL
1	(Germany) Borussia Dortmund	6	4	1	1	14	4	+10	13	Advance to knockout phase	—	2–0	1–1	4–1
2	(England) Arsenal	6	4	1	1	15	8	+7	13	Advance to knockout phase	2–0	—	3–3	4–1
3	(Belgium) Anderlecht	6	1	3	2	8	10	−2	6	Transfer to Europa League	0–3	1–2	—	2–0
4	(Turkey) Galatasaray	6	0	1	5	4	19	−15	1		0–4	1–4	1–1	—

Source: UEFA

===== Group E =====
Pos	Team	Pld	W	D	L	GF	GA	GD	Pts	Qualification	BAY	MCI	ROM	CSKA
1	(Germany) Bayern Munich	6	5	0	1	16	4	+12	15	Advance to knockout phase	—	1–0	2–0	3–0
2	(England) Manchester City	6	2	2	2	9	8	+1	8	Advance to knockout phase	3–2	—	1–1	1–2
3	(Italy) Roma	6	1	2	3	8	14	−6	5	Transfer to Europa League	1–7	0–2	—	5–1
4	(Russia) CSKA Moscow	6	1	2	3	6	13	−7	5		0–1	2–2	1–1	—

Source: UEFA

===== Group G =====
Pos	Team	Pld	W	D	L	GF	GA	GD	Pts	Qualification	CHE	SCH	SPO	MRB
1	(England) Chelsea	6	4	2	0	17	3	+14	14	Advance to knockout phase	—	1–1	3–1	6–0
2	(Germany) Schalke 04	6	2	2	2	9	14	−5	8	Advance to knockout phase	0–5	—	4–3	1–1
3	(Portugal) Sporting CP	6	2	1	3	12	12	0	7	Transfer to Europa League	0–1	4–2	—	3–1
4	(Slovenia) Maribor	6	0	3	3	4	13	−9	3		1–1	0–1	1–1	—

Source: UEFA

==== Knockout phase ====
===== Round of 16 =====
Team 1	Agg.	Team 2	1st leg	2nd leg
Paris Saint-Germain (France)	3–3 (a)	(England) Chelsea	1–1	2–2 (a.e.t.)
Manchester City (England)	1–3	(Spain) Barcelona	1–2	0–1
Bayer Leverkusen (Germany)	1–1 (2–3 p)	(Spain) Atlético Madrid	1–0	0–1 (a.e.t.)
Juventus (Italy)	5–1	(Germany) Borussia Dortmund	2–1	3–0
Schalke 04 (Germany)	4–5	(Spain) Real Madrid	0–2	4–3
Shakhtar Donetsk (Ukraine)	0–7	(Germany) Bayern Munich	0–0	0–7
Arsenal (England)	3–3 (a)	(France) Monaco	1–3	2–0
Basel (Switzerland)	1–5	(Portugal) Porto	1–1	0–4

===== Quarter-finals =====
Team 1	Agg.	Team 2	1st leg	2nd leg
Paris Saint-Germain (France)	1–5	(Spain) Barcelona	1–3	0–2
Atlético Madrid (Spain)	0–1	(Spain) Real Madrid	0–0	0–1
Porto (Portugal)	4–7	(Germany) Bayern Munich	3–1	1–6
Juventus (Italy)	1–0	(France) Monaco	1–0	0–0

===== Semi-finals =====
Team 1	Agg.	Team 2	1st leg	2nd leg
Barcelona (Spain)	5–3	(Germany) Bayern Munich	3–0	2–3
Juventus (Italy)	3–2	(Spain) Real Madrid	2–1	1–1

=== 2014–15 UEFA Europa League ===
==== Qualifying rounds ====
Team 1	Agg.	Team 2	1st leg	2nd leg
Braga (Portugal)	1–6	(Ukraine) Shakhtar Donetsk	1–2	0–4
Villarreal (Spain)	6–3	(Czech Republic) Sparta Prague	2–1	4–2
Athletic Bilbao (Spain)	3–3 (4–5 p)	(Spain) Sevilla	1–2	2–1 (a.e.t.)
Borussia Dortmund (Germany)	4–5	(England) Liverpool	1–1	3–4

== League season ==
=== Premier League ===
Despite criticism about their style of play, Chelsea regained the Premier League title after five years and handed manager José Mourinho his first title in his second spell back at the club. In addition, similar to the club's first season under Mourinho in 2004, the Blues also won the League Cup. Manchester City came second; whilst the highest scorers in the league, they never looked like defending their title. A large winless spell in January, not helped by powerhouse midfielder Yaya Touré heading to the Africa Cup of Nations saw their title defense effectively end in mid-March. Arsenal finished third, but missed out on the chance to take the runners-up spot, which was largely owed to a failure to score at home three times in their last six games. In spite of this, they retained the FA Cup title. Manchester United took the final spot for the Champions League, securing a return to the elite competition in Louis van Gaal's first season as manager, despite several defeats that included a shock 5–3 defeat to Leicester City and a 4–0 thrashing at Milton Keynes Dons in the League Cup.

Tottenham Hotspur's first season under Mauricio Pochettino saw the impressive emergence of young striker Harry Kane, but was also blighted by the issues of the previous season as their defensive woes continued; because of this, their Champions League hopes evaporated by early March. Liverpool endured a turbulent season as they struggled to adjust to life without controversial striker Luis Suárez, whilst also being without Daniel Sturridge for large portions of the campaign due to injury. Having stood 12th in late November with just 14 points, the team rallied after New Year's Day as they mounted a late Champions League attempt, with a focus more on defense than goals and impressively made the semi-finals of both club competitions, but ultimately fell short overall. In spite of these issues, however, both Spurs and Liverpool secured Europa League spots.

Southampton were tipped by many for relegation following the loss of Pochettino and many key players over the summer, but they exceeded all expectations by challenging for the Champions League, their challenge continuing into April until a poor run of form against relegation battlers saw them slip out of the race. In spite of this, manager Ronald Koeman received universal praise for his work at the club in his first season and because of Arsenal's FA Cup win, they qualified for the Europa League. Swansea secured their best points total in Garry Monk's first full season, becoming another club to exceed expectations and even complete league doubles over Manchester United and Arsenal, whilst Stoke finished ninth, securing their best points total in the top flight.

Rounding out the top ten were Crystal Palace, who were tipped to struggle following the departure of Tony Pulis just two days before the start of the season; former boss Neil Warnock returned for a second spell, but only lasted four months before being sacked with the club facing another relegation battle. The surprise managerial appointment of former player Alan Pardew saw the Eagles rocket up into mid-table and ultimately survive, securing their highest ever Premier League finish. Another surprise saw pre-season relegation favourites Leicester City achieve survival against all the odds. Despite a reasonable start that included a famous 5–3 victory over Manchester United, their form dropped and they fell to the bottom of the table in November. With relegation looking likely at the beginning of April, the Foxes suddenly came to life and secured 22 points from their last nine games to become the only promoted team to avoid the drop.

Queens Park Rangers' return to the Premier League ended in immediate relegation; the club's failure to earn an away point until mid-February proving to be a key factor despite the impressive 18 goals of Charlie Austin. Burnley finished second-bottom, being the lowest goal-scorers in the league and even a shock 1–0 win over Manchester City failing to save them. Hull City filled the last relegation spot, struggling for the majority of the season amidst controversial plans by chairman Assem Allam to change the club's name to Hull Tigers. Newcastle United started the season quite poorly, but a winning run in November saw them look to be challenging for European football for the second time in 4 seasons. However, the departure of Alan Pardew to Crystal Palace and replacing him with John Carver led to an 8-game losing streak in the spring and only surviving on the last day.

Pos	Team	Pld	W	D	L	GF	GA	GD	Pts	Qualification or relegation
1	Chelsea (C)	38	26	9	3	73	32	+41	87	Qualification for the Champions League group stage
2	Manchester City	38	24	7	7	83	38	+45	79	Qualification for the Champions League group stage
3	Arsenal	38	22	9	7	71	36	+35	75	Qualification for the Champions League group stage
4	Manchester United	38	20	10	8	62	37	+25	70	Qualification for the Champions League play-off round
5	Tottenham Hotspur	38	19	7	12	58	53	+5	64	Qualification for the Europa League group stage (Note: Since winners of the 2014–15 FA Cup, Arsenal, and winners of the 2014–15 Football League Cup, Chelsea, qualified for the Champions League based on league position, the spot awarded to the FA Cup winners (Europa League group stage) was passed to the sixth-placed team, Liverpool, and the spot awarded to the League Cup winners (Europa League third qualifying round) was passed to the seventh-placed team, Southampton, since those teams were the first teams in the table not already qualified for any European competition.)
6	Liverpool	38	18	8	12	52	48	+4	62	Qualification for the Europa League group stage
7	Southampton	38	18	6	14	54	33	+21	60	Qualification for the Europa League third qualifying round
8	Swansea City	38	16	8	14	46	49	−3	56	
9	Stoke City	38	15	9	14	48	45	+3	54	
10	Crystal Palace	38	13	9	16	47	51	−4	48	
11	Everton	38	12	11	15	48	50	−2	47	
12	West Ham United	38	12	11	15	44	47	−3	47	Qualification for the Europa League first qualifying round (Note: England was given an extra qualification berth for the Europa League first qualifying round as one of the top three associations in UEFA Respect Fair Play ranking. The spot was given to West Ham United after finishing on top of the Premier League Fair Play table.)
13	West Bromwich Albion	38	11	11	16	38	51	−13	44	
14	Leicester City	38	11	8	19	46	55	−9	41	
15	Newcastle United	38	10	9	19	40	63	−23	39	
16	Sunderland	38	7	17	14	31	53	−22	38	
17	Aston Villa	38	10	8	20	31	57	−26	38	
18	Hull City (R)	38	8	11	19	33	51	−18	35	Relegation to Football League Championship
19	Burnley (R)	38	7	12	19	28	53	−25	33	Relegation to Football League Championship
20	Queens Park Rangers (R)	38	8	6	24	42	73	−31	30	Relegation to Football League Championship

Source: Barclays Premier League
Rules for classification: 1) Points; 2) Goal difference; 3) Goals scored; 4) Play-offs (only if needed to decide champion, teams for relegation or teams for UEFA competitions).
(C) Champions; (R) Relegated

=== Football League Championship ===
In a Championship season marked with constant changes among the top six, AFC Bournemouth completed a turnaround from being within five minutes of liquidation in 2008, to reaching the Premier League for the first time in their history. They remained top for around half the season and snatched the title on the last day to win promotion as champions. This meant that Eddie Howe had achieved the rare feat of taking a club from the fourth tier to the top flight for the first time, an achievement for which he was named the Football League Manager of the Decade. Despite a spell in which they changed managers four times in 35 days between August and October, Watford found stability under Serbian Slaviša Jokanović and took advantage of slip-ups by other teams to win automatic promotion to the Premier League after an eight-year absence. Securing an immediate return to the Premier League through the play-offs were Norwich City, who beat Middlesbrough in the final; they had topped the standings early on in the season, only to fall to mid-table after a poor run of form within the winter period. Manager Neil Adams ultimately resigned in January, before the appointment of Hamilton boss Alex Neil in January re-invigorated the Canaries' campaign.

Both Wolves and Brentford, who were promoted from League One last season, were both looking for a second successive promotion, especially Brentford playing their first season in this tier in over two decades. Both eventually missed out and the latter lost in the play-off semi-final to Middlesbrough. Reading endured a season of ups and downs, having first sacked Nigel Adkins in mid-December. This led to former West Bromwich Albion manager Steve Clarke taking over the reins and despite there being an outside chance of relegation going into the last few games, the Royals beat the drop and also reached the FA Cup semi-finals, losing to Arsenal in extra-time. Rotherham United came perilously close to being dropped into the relegation zone in the final weeks after they were deducted three points for fielding an ineligible player, though they ultimately stayed up after the teams below them failed to capitalise on the situation.

Blackpool finished in bottom place (having stayed in that place since September until the end of the season), posting the joint-worst points total for a club in a 24-team second tier, failing to win away once and conceding 91 goals overall. Relegation was not helped by fan protests against owner Owen Oyston's running of the club (eventually culminating in an on-field protest that forced their final game of the season to be abandoned), as well as the fact that they had only eight players two weeks before the season started. Wigan Athletic were also relegated, just two years after they had won the FA Cup and played in the Premier League. During the season, they went through three managers and failed to win a home game between September and April as the extra games from the previous season appeared to take its toll on the Latics. Millwall filled the final relegation spot, having sacked Ian Holloway in March and appointed Neil Harris as his replacement, but he could not save them from the drop to the third tier.

Pos	Team	Pld	W	D	L	GF	GA	GD	Pts	Promotion, qualification or relegation
1	Bournemouth (C, P)	46	26	12	8	98	45	+53	90	Promotion to the Premier League
2	Watford (P)	46	27	8	11	91	50	+41	89	Promotion to the Premier League
3	Norwich City (O, P)	46	25	11	10	88	48	+40	86	Qualification for Championship play-offs
4	Middlesbrough	46	25	10	11	68	37	+31	85	Qualification for Championship play-offs
5	Brentford	46	23	9	14	78	59	+19	78	Qualification for Championship play-offs
6	Ipswich Town	46	22	12	12	72	54	+18	78	Qualification for Championship play-offs
7	Wolverhampton Wanderers	46	22	12	12	70	56	+14	78	
8	Derby County	46	21	14	11	85	56	+29	77	
9	Blackburn Rovers	46	17	16	13	66	59	+7	67	
10	Birmingham City	46	16	15	15	54	64	−10	63	
11	Cardiff City	46	16	14	16	57	61	−4	62	
12	Charlton Athletic	46	14	18	14	54	60	−6	60	
13	Sheffield Wednesday	46	14	18	14	43	49	−6	60	
14	Nottingham Forest	46	15	14	17	71	69	+2	59	
15	Leeds United	46	15	11	20	50	61	−11	56	
16	Huddersfield Town	46	13	16	17	58	75	−17	55	
17	Fulham	46	14	10	22	62	83	−21	52	
18	Bolton Wanderers	46	13	12	21	54	67	−13	51	
19	Reading	46	13	11	22	48	69	−21	50	
20	Brighton & Hove Albion	46	10	17	19	44	54	−10	47	
21	Rotherham United	46	11	16	19	46	67	−21	46 (Note: Rotherham United were deducted three points for fielding an ineligible player.)	
22	Millwall (R)	46	9	14	23	42	76	−34	41	Relegation to Football League One
23	Wigan Athletic (R)	46	9	12	25	39	64	−25	39	Relegation to Football League One
24	Blackpool (R)	46	4	14	28	36	91	−55	26	Relegation to Football League One

Updated to match(es) played on 2 May 2015. Source: Sky Sports
Rules for classification: 1) Points; 2) Goal difference; 3) Number of goals scored
(C) Champions; (O) Play-off winners; (P) Promoted; (R) Relegated

=== Football League One ===
Bristol City ended their two-year absence from the Championship, topping the division for virtually the entire season and becoming the first club in the country to win promotion. Milton Keynes Dons, the top scorers in any of the four divisions, snatched automatic promotion from under the noses of Preston North End on the final day, winning promotion to the Championship for the first time as the current incarnation of the club; they also enjoyed a famous Football League Cup upset over Manchester United in their first ever meeting. Preston made amends for their last-day slip-up by thrashing Swindon Town in the play-off final to end a five-year absence from the second tier, and in the process finally winning a play-off tournament after nine unsuccessful tries.

Despite being hotly tipped to make an immediate return to the Championship, Yeovil Town spent most of the season rooted to the bottom of the table (and in fact, they were glued to the bottom from February) and they suffered their second successive relegation, finding themselves back in League Two for the first time in a decade after only recording ten wins in the whole season. Similarly, Leyton Orient were also among the promotion favourites after their play-off final appearance the previous year but struggled all season after going through four managers and they ultimately finished second bottom. Crawley Town were relegated back to League Two after three years at this level; they had appeared to be well out of the reach of relegation but following manager John Gregory stepping down for heart surgery, their form collapsed under Dean Saunders. Notts County filled the final relegation spot, ultimately being cost dear by a disastrous second half of the season after some promising early form.

Crewe Alexandra survived a second relegation battle in a row despite more heavy thrashings in the season, whilst Colchester United's final day win to deny Preston automatic promotion confirmed their survival having been cut adrift for most of the season.

Pos	Team	Pld	W	D	L	GF	GA	GD	Pts	Promotion, qualification or relegation
1	Bristol City (C, P)	46	29	12	5	96	38	+58	99	Promotion to Football League Championship
2	Milton Keynes Dons (P)	46	27	10	9	101	44	+57	91	Promotion to Football League Championship
3	Preston North End (O, P)	46	25	14	7	79	40	+39	89	Qualification for League One play-offs (Note: Four teams play for one spot and promotion to Football League Championship.)
4	Swindon Town	46	23	10	13	76	57	+19	79	Qualification for League One play-offs
5	Sheffield United	46	19	14	13	66	53	+13	71	Qualification for League One play-offs
6	Chesterfield	46	19	12	15	68	55	+13	69	Qualification for League One play-offs
7	Bradford City	46	17	14	15	55	55	0	65	
8	Rochdale	46	19	6	21	72	66	+6	63	
9	Peterborough United	46	18	9	19	53	56	−3	63	
10	Fleetwood Town	46	17	12	17	49	52	−3	63	
11	Barnsley	46	17	11	18	62	61	+1	62	
12	Gillingham	46	16	14	16	65	66	−1	62	
13	Doncaster Rovers	46	16	13	17	58	62	−4	61	
14	Walsall	46	14	17	15	50	54	−4	59	
15	Oldham Athletic	46	14	15	17	54	67	−13	57	
16	Scunthorpe United	46	14	14	18	62	75	−13	56	
17	Coventry City	46	13	16	17	49	60	−11	55	
18	Port Vale	46	15	9	22	55	65	−10	54	
19	Colchester United	46	14	10	22	58	77	−19	52	
20	Crewe Alexandra	46	14	10	22	43	75	−32	52	
21	Notts County (R)	46	12	14	20	45	63	−18	50	Relegation to Football League Two
22	Crawley Town (R)	46	13	11	22	53	79	−26	50	Relegation to Football League Two
23	Leyton Orient (R)	46	12	13	21	59	69	−10	49	Relegation to Football League Two
24	Yeovil Town (R)	46	10	10	26	36	75	−39	40	Relegation to Football League Two

Updated to match(es) played on 3 May 2015. Source: BBC Sport
Rules for classification: 1) Points; 2) Goal difference; 3) Number of goals scored
(C) Champions; (O) Play-off winners; (P) Promoted; (R) Relegated

=== Football League Two ===
Just six years after their first ever promotion to the Football League and just missing out on promotion a year earlier, Burton Albion were promoted as champions. While manager Gary Rowett departed for Birmingham City early in the season, his replacement in top-flight legend Jimmy Floyd Hasselbaink guided the club into the top six and then finally promotion. Shrewsbury Town went up in second, securing an instant return to League One; they had actually led the table for much of the season but were made to pay for slip-ups that Burton took advantage of. Taking the third automatic slot in dramatic fashion were Bury, who almost slipped out of the race, but a last-day win over Tranmere Rovers saw the club also promoted. Southend United were forced all the way to extra time and penalties by Wycombe Wanderers, but ultimately scraped past their opponents to take the last promotion spot and secure their place in League One.

Luton Town, on their return to the Football League after five years, just missed out on a playoff place by virtue of Plymouth Argyle's victory over Shrewsbury whilst Portsmouth suffered an even lower league finish than the previous year, finishing in 16th with the club failing to make anything similar to a promotion challenge, but some good run of forms prevented them from being in another relegation battle.

Falling out of the Football League were Tranmere Rovers, who suffered a second relegation in a row and dropped into the Football Conference after 94 years. Cheltenham Town filled the second relegation spot, falling out of the Football League after sixteen years; they had started the season reasonably well with 23 points from 14 games, but imploded disastrously after long-serving manager Mark Yates was sacked in favor of Paul Buckle, with not even the late-season arrival of veteran manager Gary Johnson saving them. Hartlepool United had been in the relegation zone for good chunks of the season, but an impressive March saw the club fight their way to safety.

Pos	Team	Pld	W	D	L	GF	GA	GD	Pts	Promotion, qualification or relegation
1	Burton Albion (C, P)	46	28	10	8	69	39	+30	94	Promotion to Football League One
2	Shrewsbury Town (P)	46	27	8	11	67	31	+36	89	Promotion to Football League One
3	Bury (P)	46	26	7	13	60	40	+20	85	Promotion to Football League One
4	Wycombe Wanderers	46	23	15	8	67	45	+22	84	Qualification for League Two play-offs (Note: Four teams play for one spot and promotion to Football League One.)
5	Southend United (O, P)	46	24	12	10	54	38	+16	84	Qualification for League Two play-offs
6	Stevenage	46	20	12	14	62	54	+8	72	Qualification for League Two play-offs
7	Plymouth Argyle	46	20	11	15	55	37	+18	71	Qualification for League Two play-offs
8	Luton Town	46	19	11	16	54	44	+10	68	
9	Newport County	46	18	11	17	51	54	−3	65	
10	Exeter City	46	17	13	16	61	65	−4	64	
11	Morecambe	46	17	12	17	53	52	+1	63	
12	Northampton Town	46	18	7	21	67	62	+5	61	
13	Oxford United	46	15	16	15	50	49	+1	61	
14	Dagenham & Redbridge	46	17	8	21	58	59	−1	59	
15	AFC Wimbledon	46	14	16	16	54	60	−6	58	
16	Portsmouth	46	14	15	17	52	54	−2	57	
17	Accrington Stanley	46	15	11	20	58	77	−19	56	
18	York City	46	11	19	16	46	51	−5	52	
19	Cambridge United	46	13	12	21	61	66	−5	51	
20	Carlisle United	46	14	8	24	56	74	−18	50	
21	Mansfield Town	46	13	9	24	38	62	−24	48	
22	Hartlepool United	46	12	9	25	39	70	−31	45	
23	Cheltenham Town (R)	46	9	14	23	40	67	−27	41	Relegation to the National League
24	Tranmere Rovers (R)	46	9	12	25	45	67	−22	39	Relegation to the National League

Updated to match(es) played on 23 May 2015. Source: BBC Sport
Rules for classification: 1) Points; 2) Goal difference; 3) Number of goals scored
(C) Champions; (O) Play-off winners; (P) Promoted; (R) Relegated

=== Conference Premier ===
A close title race saw Barnet return to the Football League after a two-year absence, which also made them the first club to win promotion to the Football League three times. Pushing them all the way and then winning in the playoffs were Bristol Rovers who secured an immediate return to the Football League, despite being pushed themselves all the way to penalties by Grimsby.

Following the departure of manager Kevin Wilkin late in the previous season, Nuneaton were relegated in bottom place. AFC Telford United were immediately relegated back to the Conference North after being in bottom place for most of the season. Dartford finished third-bottom and experienced the relegation that they only avoided the previous season thanks to the demise of Salisbury City. Alfreton Town filled the final relegation spot and went down on goal difference; they were ultimately cost dear by having the worst defensive record in the division, eventually culminating in a 7–0 thrashing by Bristol Rovers on the final day of the season, when a draw would have been sufficient to prevent relegation.

Pos	Team	Pld	W	D	L	GF	GA	GD	Pts	Promotion, qualification or relegation
1	Barnet (C, P)	46	28	8	10	94	46	+48	92	Promotion to Football League Two
2	Bristol Rovers (O, P)	46	25	16	5	73	34	+39	91	Qualification for the Conference Premier play-offs
3	Grimsby Town	46	25	11	10	74	40	+34	86	Qualification for the Conference Premier play-offs
4	Eastleigh	46	24	10	12	87	61	+26	82	Qualification for the Conference Premier play-offs
5	Forest Green Rovers	46	22	16	8	80	54	+26	79 (Note: Forest Green Rovers were deducted three points for fielding an ineligible player in their win over Southport on 9 August 2014.)	Qualification for the Conference Premier play-offs
6	Macclesfield Town	46	21	15	10	60	46	+14	78	
7	Woking	46	21	13	12	77	52	+25	76	
8	Dover Athletic	46	19	11	16	69	58	+11	68	
9	FC Halifax Town	46	17	15	14	60	54	+6	66	
10	Gateshead	46	17	15	14	66	62	+4	66	
11	Wrexham	46	17	15	14	56	52	+4	66	
12	Chester	46	19	6	21	64	76	−12	63	
13	Torquay United	46	16	13	17	64	60	+4	61	
14	Braintree Town	46	18	5	23	56	57	−1	59	
15	Lincoln City	46	16	10	20	62	71	−9	58	
16	Kidderminster Harriers	46	15	12	19	51	60	−9	57	
17	Altrincham	46	16	8	22	54	73	−19	56	
18	Aldershot Town	46	14	11	21	51	61	−10	53	
19	Southport	46	13	12	21	47	72	−25	51	
20	Welling United	46	11	12	23	52	73	−21	45	
21	Alfreton Town (R)	46	12	9	25	49	90	−41	45	Relegation to National League North
22	Dartford (R)	46	8	15	23	44	74	−30	39	Relegation to National League South
23	AFC Telford United (R)	46	10	9	27	58	84	−26	36 (Note: AFC Telford United were deducted three points for fielding an ineligible player in their win over Lincoln City on 11 April 2015.)	Relegation to National League North
24	Nuneaton Town (R)	46	10	9	27	38	76	−38	36 (Note: Nuneaton Town were deducted three points for fielding an ineligible player in their win over Welling United on 28 February 2015.)	Relegation to National League North

Source: Football Conference
Rules for classification: 1) Points; 2) Goal difference; 3) Number of goals scored
(C) Champions; (O) Play-off winners; (P) Promoted; (R) Relegated

== Cup competitions ==
=== FA Cup ===
==== Final ====
30 May 2015
17:30 GMT

Arsenal	4–0	Aston Villa
Walcott 40'; Sánchez 50'; Mertesacker 62'; Giroud 90'	Report

Wembley Stadium, London
Attendance: 89,283
Referee: Jonathan Moss (West Yorkshire)

=== League Cup ===
==== Final ====
1 March 2015
16:00 GMT

Chelsea	2–0	Tottenham Hotspur
Terry 45'; Costa 56'	Report

Wembley Stadium, London
Attendance: 89,294
Referee: Anthony Taylor (Cheshire)

=== Community Shield ===
10 August 2014
15:00 BST

Arsenal	3–0	Manchester City
Cazorla 22'; Ramsey 43'; Giroud 62'	Report

Wembley Stadium, London
Attendance: 71,523
Referee: Michael Oliver (Northumberland)

=== Football League Trophy ===
==== Final ====
22 March 2015
15:30 GMT

Walsall	0–2	Bristol City
	Report	Flint 15'; Little 51'

Wembley Stadium, London
Attendance: 72,315
Referee: Mick Russell (Hertfordshire)

== Women's football ==
=== Women's Super League ===
==== Women's Super League 1 ====
Pos	Team	Pld	W	D	L	GF	GA	GD	Pts	Qualification or relegation
1	Chelsea (C)	14	10	2	2	30	10	+20	32	Qualification for the Champions League knockout phase
2	Manchester City	14	9	3	2	25	11	+14	30	Qualification for the Champions League knockout phase
3	Arsenal	14	8	3	3	21	13	+8	27	
4	Sunderland	14	6	2	6	24	24	0	20	
5	Notts County	14	4	3	7	20	20	0	15	
6	Birmingham City	14	3	4	7	7	14	−7	13	
7	Liverpool	14	4	1	9	15	24	−9	13	
8	Bristol Academy (R)	14	2	2	10	12	38	−26	8	Relegation to the FA WSL 2

Source: FA WSL
Rules for classification: 1) Points; 2) Goal difference; 3) Number of goals scored
(C) Champions; (R) Relegated

==== Women's Super League 2 ====
Pos	Team	Pld	W	D	L	GF	GA	GD	Pts	Promotion
1	Reading (C)	18	14	3	1	61	15	+46	45	Promotion to FA WSL 1
2	Doncaster Rovers Belles	18	14	3	1	57	15	+42	45	Promotion to FA WSL 1
3	Everton	18	8	7	3	43	24	+19	31	
4	Yeovil Town	18	9	4	5	36	23	+13	31	
5	Aston Villa	18	7	4	7	29	28	+1	25	
6	Oxford United	18	7	3	8	26	40	−14	24	
7	Durham	18	6	2	10	24	32	−8	20	
8	London Bees	18	3	4	11	19	53	−34	13	
9	Millwall Lionesses	18	2	6	10	17	39	−22	12	
10	Watford	18	1	2	15	12	55	−43	5	

Updated to match(es) played on 18 October 2015. Source: FA WSL
Rules for classification: 1) Points; 2) Goal difference; 3) Number of goals scored
(C) Champions

=== Women's Premier League ===
==== Northern Division ====
Pos	Team	Pld	W	D	L	GF	GA	GD	Pts	Promotion or relegation
1	Sheffield (C, O, P)	22	19	1	2	76	19	+57	58	Qualification for the Championship play-off
2	Coventry City	22	18	2	2	64	16	+48	56	
3	Blackburn Rovers	22	13	3	6	46	34	+12	42	
4	Bradford City	22	11	6	5	49	28	+21	39	
5	Huddersfield Town	22	8	5	9	53	65	−12	29	
6	Derby County	22	8	3	11	45	56	−11	27	
7	Stoke City	22	8	2	12	38	38	0	26	
8	Preston North End	22	7	5	10	41	46	−5	26	
9	Nottingham Forest	22	7	2	13	34	52	−18	23	
10	Sporting Club Albion	22	5	6	11	23	36	−13	21	
11	Newcastle United	22	5	5	12	33	50	−17	20	
12	Wolverhampton Wanderers (R)	22	2	2	18	17	79	−62	8	Relegation to the Midlands Division One

Source: FA WPL
(C) Champions; (O) Play-off winners; (P) Promoted; (R) Relegated

==== Southern Division ====
Pos	Team	Pld	W	D	L	GF	GA	GD	Pts	Promotion or relegation
1	Portsmouth (C)	22	18	2	2	62	25	+37	56	Qualification for the Championship play-off
2	Brighton & Hove Albion	22	17	2	3	63	22	+41	53	
3	Charlton Athletic	22	15	3	4	88	34	+54	48	
4	Cardiff City	22	14	3	5	69	26	+43	45	
5	Tottenham Hotspur	22	12	3	7	60	40	+20	39	
6	West Ham United	22	10	5	7	39	30	+9	35	
7	Queens Park Rangers	22	6	4	12	28	42	−14	22	
8	Lewes	22	6	3	13	31	37	−6	21	
9	Copsewood (Coventry)	22	6	2	14	22	66	−44	20	
10	Plymouth Argyle	22	4	6	12	25	60	−35	18	
11	Gillingham (R)	22	4	3	15	28	65	−37	15	Relegation to the South East Division One
12	Keynsham Town (R)	22	1	2	19	26	94	−68	5	Relegation to the South West Division One

Source: FA WPL
(C) Champions; (R) Relegated

==== Northern Division One ====
Pos	Team	Pld	W	D	L	GF	GA	GD	Pts	Promotion or relegation
1	Guiseley Vixens (C, P)	22	17	1	4	78	35	+43	52	Promotion to the Northern Division
2	Liverpool Marshall Feds	22	16	2	4	46	26	+20	50	
3	Leeds	22	15	1	6	57	31	+26	46	
4	Middlesbrough	22	11	4	7	56	40	+16	37	
5	Chorley	22	11	3	8	44	36	+8	36	
6	Chester-le-Street	22	10	4	8	44	38	+6	34	
7	Mossley Hill	22	10	3	9	55	38	+17	33	
8	Stockport County	22	8	2	12	46	58	−12	26	
9	Tranmere Rovers	22	6	6	10	20	31	−11	24	
10	Morecambe	22	7	1	14	40	45	−5	22	
11	Norton & Stockton Ancients (R)	22	5	1	16	26	65	−39	16	Relegation from the Premier League.
12	Sheffield United (R)	22	1	2	19	21	90	−69	5	Relegation from the Premier League.

Source: The Football Association
Rules for classification: 1) Points; 2) Goal difference; 3) Number of goals scored
(C) Champions; (P) Promoted; (R) Relegated

==== Midlands Division One ====
Pos	Team	Pld	W	D	L	GF	GA	GD	Pts	Promotion or relegation
1	Loughborough Foxes (C, P)	22	16	4	2	69	26	+43	52	Promotion to the Northern Division
2	Leicester City	22	14	4	4	51	23	+28	46	
3	Leafield Athletic	22	14	1	7	70	38	+32	43	
4	Radcliffe Olympic	22	13	4	5	52	26	+26	43	
5	Loughborough Students	22	10	3	9	43	34	+9	33	
6	Rotherham United	22	10	2	10	51	53	−2	32	
7	Solihull	22	8	5	9	44	45	−1	29	
8	FC Reedswood	22	8	3	11	41	41	0	27	
9	Leicester City Ladies	22	7	5	10	20	32	−12	26	
10	Steel City Wanderers	22	6	3	13	31	50	−19	21	
11	Mansfield Town (R)	22	5	6	11	30	59	−29	21	Relegation from the Premier League.
12	Curzon Ashton (R)	22	0	2	20	17	92	−75	2	Relegation from the Premier League.

Source: Football Association
Rules for classification: 1) Points; 2) Goal difference; 3) Number of goals scored
(C) Champions; (P) Promoted; (R) Relegated

==== South East Division One ====
Pos	Team	Pld	W	D	L	GF	GA	GD	Pts	Promotion or relegation
1	C & K Basildon (C, P)	18	13	3	2	54	21	+33	42	Promotion to the Southern Division
2	Milton Keynes Dons	18	12	4	2	40	15	+25	40	
3	Crystal Palace	18	11	4	3	41	22	+19	37	
4	Luton Town	18	8	3	7	29	30	−1	27	
5	Enfield Town	18	7	4	7	29	30	−1	25	
6	Denham United	18	6	5	7	35	24	+11	23	
7	Cambridge United	18	5	5	8	19	29	−10	20	
8	Bedford	18	5	3	10	29	38	−9	18	
9	Ipswich Town	18	3	5	10	30	42	−12	14	
10	Norwich City	18	1	2	15	15	70	−55	5	

Source: The Football Association
Rules for classification: 1) Points; 2) Goal difference; 3) Number of goals scored
(C) Champions; (P) Promoted

==== South West Division One ====
Pos	Team	Pld	W	D	L	GF	GA	GD	Pts	Promotion or relegation
1	Forest Green Rovers (C, P)	16	10	2	4	44	19	+25	32	Promotion to the Southern Division
2	Exeter City	16	10	2	4	45	23	+22	32	
3	Swindon Town	16	10	4	2	42	18	+24	31 (Note: Swindon Town were deducted 3 points)	
4	Southampton Saints	16	9	1	6	39	30	+9	28	
5	Larkhall Athletic	16	7	2	7	31	26	+5	23	
6	Shanklin	16	6	4	6	22	28	−6	22	
7	Chichester City	16	6	3	7	26	27	−1	21	
8	Cheltenham Town	16	3	2	11	19	52	−33	11	
9	St Nicholas	16	1	0	15	11	56	−45	3	

Source: The Football Association
Rules for classification: 1) Points; 2) Goal difference; 3) Number of goals scored
(C) Champions; (P) Promoted

=== Women's FA Cup ===
==== Final ====
1 August 2015
15:00 BST

Chelsea	1–0	Notts County
Ji 37'	Report

Wembley Stadium, London
Attendance: 30,710
Referee: Amy Fearn (Derbyshire)

=== FA WSL Cup ===
==== Final ====
1 November 2015
15:00 GMT (UTC±00:00)

Arsenal	3–0	Notts County
Nobbs 26', 41'; Ubogagu 90+2'	Report

New York Stadium, Rotherham
Attendance: 5,028
Referee: Jane Simms

== Managerial changes ==
This is a list of changes of managers within English league football:

Team	Outgoing manager	Manner of departure	Date of departure	Position in table	Incoming manager	Date of appointment	Position in table at time of appointment
Blackpool	Paul Ince	Sacked	21 January 2014	14th (2013–14 season)	José Riga	11 June 2014	Pre-season
Nottingham Forest	Billy Davies	Sacked	24 March 2014	5th (2013–14 season)	Stuart Pearce	1 July 2014 (Note: Although Pearce was announced on as new manager on 3 April, his official tenure began on 1 July)	Pre-season
Tranmere Rovers	Ronnie Moore	Sacked	9 April 2014 (Note: Moore was suspended from his duties for gambling-related offences on 17 February, before being formally dismissed on 9 April. John McMahon managed Tranmere from Moore's suspension until the end of the season.)	19th (2013–14 season)	Robert Edwards	27 May 2014	Pre-season
West Bromwich Albion	Pepe Mel	Mutual consent	12 May 2014	Pre-season	Alan Irvine	14 June 2014	Pre-season
Shrewsbury Town	Michael Jackson	Appointed as assistant manager	12 May 2014	Pre-season	Micky Mellon	12 May 2014	Pre-season
Brighton & Hove Albion	Óscar García Junyent	Resigned	12 May 2014	Pre-season	Sami Hyypiä	6 June 2014	Pre-season
Tottenham Hotspur	Tim Sherwood	Sacked	13 May 2014	Pre-season	Mauricio Pochettino	27 May 2014	Pre-season
Charlton Athletic	José Riga	End of contract	27 May 2014	Pre-season	Bob Peeters	27 May 2014	Pre-season
Southampton	Mauricio Pochettino	Signed by Tottenham Hotspur	27 May 2014	Pre-season	Ronald Koeman	16 June 2014	Pre-season
Leeds United	Brian McDermott	Mutual Consent	31 May 2014	Pre-season	Dave Hockaday	19 June 2014	Pre-season
Oxford United	Gary Waddock	Sacked	4 July 2014	Pre-season	Michael Appleton	4 July 2014	Pre-season
Huddersfield Town	Mark Robins	Sacked	10 August 2014	24th	Chris Powell	3 September 2014	21st
Crystal Palace	Tony Pulis	Mutual Consent	14 August 2014	Pre-season	Neil Warnock	27 August 2014	18th
Leeds United	Dave Hockaday	Sacked	28 August 2014	21st	Darko Milanic	24 September 2014	12th
Watford	Giuseppe Sannino	Resigned	31 August 2014	2nd	Óscar García Junyent	2 September 2014	2nd
Colchester United	Joe Dunne	Mutual Consent	1 September 2014	23rd	Tony Humes	1 September 2014	23rd
Carlisle United	Graham Kavanagh	Sacked	1 September 2014	22nd	Keith Curle	19 September 2014	24th
Accrington Stanley	James Beattie	Mutual consent	12 September 2014	21st	John Coleman	18 September 2014	20th
Port Vale	Micky Adams	Resigned	18 September 2014	23rd	Rob Page	18 September 2014	23rd
Cardiff City	Ole Gunnar Solskjær	Mutual consent	18 September 2014	17th	Russell Slade	6 October 2014	15th
Fulham	Felix Magath	Sacked	18 September 2014	24th	Kit Symons	29 October 2014	20th
Leyton Orient	Russell Slade	Resigned	24 September 2014	17th	Mauro Milanese	26 October 2014	18th
Watford	Óscar García Junyent	Resigned	29 September 2014	4th	Billy McKinlay	29 September 2014	4th
Bolton Wanderers	Dougie Freedman	Mutual consent	3 October 2014	23rd	Neil Lennon	12 October 2014	24th
Hartlepool United	Colin Cooper	Resigned	4 October 2014	24th	Paul Murray	23 October 2014	23rd
Watford	Billy McKinlay	Sacked	6 October 2014	3rd	Slavisa Jokanovic	7 October 2014	3rd
Scunthorpe United	Russ Wilcox	Sacked	8 October 2014	23rd	Mark Robins	13 October 2014	23rd
York City	Nigel Worthington	Resigned	13 October 2014	22nd	Russ Wilcox	15 October 2014	22nd
Tranmere Rovers	Robert Edwards	Sacked	13 October 2014	24th	Micky Adams	16 October 2014	24th
Birmingham City	Lee Clark	Sacked	20 October 2014	21st	Gary Rowett	27 October	23rd
Leeds United	Darko Milanic	Sacked	25 October 2014	18th	Neil Redfearn	1 November 2014	18th
Burton Albion	Gary Rowett	Signed by Birmingham City	27 October 2014	3rd	Jimmy Floyd Hasselbank	13 November 2014	5th
Blackpool	José Riga	Sacked	28 October 2014	24th	Lee Clark	30 October 2014	24th
Wigan Athletic	Uwe Rösler	Sacked	13 November 2014	22nd	Malky Mackay	19 November 2014	22nd
Mansfield Town	Paul Cox	Mutual consent	21 November 2014	19th	Adam Murray	5 December 2014	
Cheltenham Town	Mark Yates	Sacked	25 November 2014	18th	Paul Buckle	26 November 2014	18th
Reading	Nigel Adkins	Sacked	15 December 2014	16th	Steve Clarke	16 December 2014	16th
Brighton & Hove Albion	Sami Hyypiä	Resigned	22 December 2014	22nd	Chris Hughton	31 December 2014	21st
Crystal Palace	Neil Warnock	Sacked	27 December 2014	18th	Alan Pardew	2 January 2015	18th
West Bromwich Albion	(Scotland) Alan Irvine	Sacked	29 December 2014	16th	(Wales) Tony Pulis	1 January 2015	
Newcastle United	(England) Alan Pardew	Signed by Crystal Palace	2 January 2015	10th	(England) John Carver	26 January 2015	
Gillingham	Peter Taylor	Sacked	31 December 2014	19th	Justin Edinburgh	7 February 2015	17th
Norwich City	Neil Adams	Resigned	5 January 2015	7th	Alex Neil	9 January 2015	7th
Charlton Athletic	Bob Peeters	Sacked	11 January 2015	14th	Guy Luzon	14 January 2015	14th
Nottingham Forest	(England) Stuart Pearce	Sacked	1 February 2015	12th	(Scotland) Dougie Freedman	1 February 2015	12th
Queens Park Rangers	Harry Redknapp	Resigned	3 February 2015	19th	Chris Ramsey	4 February 2015	19th
Yeovil Town	Gary Johnson	Sacked	4 February 2015	24th	Paul Sturrock	9 April 2015	24th
Newport County	Justin Edinburgh	Signed by Gillingham	7 February 2015	6th	Terry Butcher	30 April 2015	8th
Aston Villa	Paul Lambert	Sacked	11 February 2015	18th	Tim Sherwood	14 February 2015	18th
Barnsley	Danny Wilson	Sacked	12 February 2015	17th	Lee Johnson	25 February 2015	
Cheltenham Town	Paul Buckle	Mutual consent	13 February 2015	22nd	Gary Johnson	30 March 2015	
Peterborough United	Darren Ferguson	Sacked	22 February 2015	15th	Dave Robertson	22 May 2015	9th
Coventry City	Steven Pressley	Sacked	22 February 2015	21st	Tony Mowbray	3 March 2015	
Oldham Athletic	Lee Johnson	Signed by Barnsley	25 February 2015	9th			
Millwall	(England) Ian Holloway	Sacked	10 March 2015	23rd	(England) Neil Harris	29 April 2015	
Sunderland	(Uruguay) Gus Poyet	Sacked	16 March 2015	17th	(Netherlands) Dick Advocaat	17 March 2015	
Notts County	Shaun Derry	Sacked	23 March 2015	20th	Ricardo Moniz	7 April 2015	
Wigan Athletic	(Scotland) Malky Mackay	Sacked	6 April 2015	23rd	(Scotland) Gary Caldwell	7 April 2015	
Portsmouth	Andy Awford	Mutual Consent	13 April 2015	14th	Paul Cook	12 May 2015	
Tranmere Rovers	Micky Adams	Mutual Consent	19 April 2015	24th	Gary Brabin	5 May 2015	

== Clubs dissolved ==
Club	League	Date of Dissolution
Salisbury City	None (last in 2013–14 Conference Premier)	4 December 2014
Hereford United	Southern League Premier Division	19 December 2014

== Deaths ==
- 1 June 2014: Brian Farmer, 80, Birmingham City and Bournemouth & Boscombe Athletic right back.
- 13 June 2014: Willie Harvey, 84, Bradford Park Avenue inside forward.
- 24 June 2014: John Fantham, 75, England, Sheffield Wednesday and Rotherham United inside forward.
- 3 July 2014: David Jones, 79, Swansea Town goalkeeper.
- 5 July 2014: Brian Wood, 73, Crystal Palace, Leyton Orient, Colchester United and Workington defender.
- 6 July 2014: Peter Kearns, 77, former Plymouth Argyle, Aldershot and Lincoln City inside forward.
- 19 July 2014: Ray King, 89, former Port Vale goalkeeper.
- 22 July 2014: Morris Stevenson, 71, former Luton Town inside forward.
- 23 July 2014: Jordan Tabor, 23, former Cheltenham Town defender.
- 28 July 2014: Alex Forbes, 89, former Scotland, Sheffield United, Arsenal, Leyton Orient and Fulham wing half.
- 31 July 2014: Jeff Bourne, 66, Derby County, Crystal Palace and Sheffield United forward
- 6 August 2014: Jimmy Walsh, 84, former Leicester City striker.
- 21 August 2014: Don Clark, 96, former Bristol City forward.
- 10 September 2014: David Whyte, 43, former Crystal Palace, Charlton Athletic, Ipswich Town, Bristol Rovers and Southend United striker.
- 28 September 2014: Tim Rawlings, 81, former Walsall and Port Vale half-back.
- 29 September 2014: Len Stephenson, 84, former Blackpool, Port Vale and Oldham Athletic forward.
- 5 October 2014: John Best, 74, former USA and Tranmere Rovers defender.
- 19 October 2014: Arnold Mitchell, 84, former Notts County and Exeter City right half.
- 19 October 2014: Don Ratcliffe, 79, former Stoke City, Middlesbrough, Darlington and Crewe Alexandra winger.
- 21 October 2014: Jim Barrett, Jr., 83, former West Ham United, Nottingham Forest and Birmingham City inside forward.
- 24 October 2014: Martin Garratt, 34, former York City, Mansfield Town and Lincoln City midfielder.
- 24 October 2014: Malcolm Thompson, 68, former Hartlepool United and Scarborough striker.
- 29 October 2014: Klas Ingesson, 46, former Sweden and Sheffield Wednesday midfielder.
- 30 October 2014: Joe Brown, 85, former Middlesbrough, Burnley, AFC Bournemouth & Boscombe Athletic and Aldershot left half and manager of Burnley.
- 3 November 2014: Geoff Cox, 79, former Birmingham City and Torquay United winger.
- 3 November 2014: Ivor Seemley, 85, former Sheffield Wednesday, Stockport County and Chesterfield left back.
- 4 November 2014: Derek Hogg, 84, former Leicester City, West Bromwich Albion and Cardiff City outside left.
- 4 November 2014: Eddie Stuart, 83, former Wolverhampton Wanderers, Stoke City, Tranmere Rovers and Stockport County defender.
- 5 November 2014: Roy Hartle, 83, former Bolton Wanderers full back.
- 7 November 2014: Alex Bain, 78, former Huddersfield Town, Chesterfield and AFC Bournemouth forward.
- 8 November 2014: Sammy Wilson, 82, former Millwall inside left.
- 13 November 2014: Jim Storrie, 74, former Leeds United, Rotherham United and Portsmouth forward.
- 15 November 2014: Valéry Mézague, 30, former Cameroon, Portsmouth and Bury midfielder.
- 20 November 2014: Iain Hesford, 54, former Blackpool, Sunderland, Hull City and Maidstone United goalkeeper.
- 23 November 2014: John Neal, 82, former Hull City, Swindon Town, Aston Villa and Southend United defender, who also managed Wrexham, Middlesbrough and Chelsea.
- 26 November 2014: Malcolm Finlayson, 84, former Millwall and Wolverhampton Wanderers goalkeeper.
- November 2014: Reg Foulkes, 91, former Walsall and Norwich City defender.
- November 2014: Albert Jackson, 71, former Oldham Athletic defender.
- 7 December 2014: Tommy Todd, 88, former Crewe Alexandra, Derby County and Rochdale forward.
- 19 December 2014: Pat Holton, 78, former Chelsea and Southend United defender.
- 27 December 2014: Ron Henry, 80, former England and Tottenham Hotspur defender.
- 31 December 2014: Jimmy Dunn, 91, former Wolverhampton Wanderers and Derby County inside forward.
- January 2015: John McPhee, 77, former Blackpool, Barnsley and Southport defender
- 8 January 2015: Sam Morris, 84, former Chester City wing half.
- 10 January 2015: Roger Wosahlo, 67, former Chelsea, Ipswich Town and Peterborough United winger.
- 11 January 2015: Albert McPherson, 87, former Walsall centre half, who also went on to coach at West Bromwich Albion.
- 13 January 2015: Sir Jack Hayward, 91, former Wolverhampton Wanderers owner.
- 14 January 2015: Danny Malloy, 84, former Cardiff City and Doncaster Rovers defender.
- 16 January 2015: Bill Dodd, 78, former Workington forward.
- 19 January 2015: Ken Furphy, 83, former Darlington, Workington and Watford defender, who also had spells in management with Workington, Watford, Blackburn Rovers and Sheffield United.
- 25 January 2015: Ian Towers, 74, former Burnley, Oldham Athletic and Bury striker.
- 30 January 2015: Harold Hassall, 85, former England, Huddersfield Town and Bolton Wanderers forward.
- 2 February 2015: Roy Little, 83, former Manchester City, Brighton & Hove Albion and Crystal Palace defender.
- 9 February 2015: Nick Sharkey, 71, former Sunderland, Leicester City, Mansfield Town and Hartlepool United forward.
- 10 February 2015: Tom McQueen, 85, former Accrington Stanley goalkeeper.
- February 2015: Geoff Morris, 65, former Walsall, Shrewsbury Town and Port Vale winger.
- 3 March 2015: Dave Mackay, 80, former Scotland, Tottenham Hotspur, Derby County and Swindon Town left half, who also had spells in management with Swindon Town, Nottingham Forest, Derby County, Walsall, Doncaster Rovers and Birmingham City.
- 3 March 2015: Roy McCrohan, 84, former Reading, Norwich City, Colchester United and Bristol Rovers wing half.
- 25 March 2015: Jimmy McGill, 68, former Arsenal, Huddersfield Town, Hull City and Halifax Town midfielder.
- 25 March 2015: Ron Suart, 94, former Blackpool and Blackburn Rovers defender, who also managed Scunthorpe & Lindsay United, Blackpool and Chelsea.
- 26 March 2015: Ian Moir, 71, former Manchester United, Blackpool, Chester City, Wrexham and Shrewsbury Town midfielder.
- 4 April 2015: Bill Ellerington, 91, former England and Southampton full back.
- 7 April 2015: Harry Dowd, 76, former Manchester City and Oldham Athletic goalkeeper.
- 8 April 2015: Billy Ronson, 58, former Blackpool, Cardiff City, Wrexham and Barnsley midfielder.
- 10 April 2015: Ray Treacy, 68, former Republic of Ireland, West Bromwich Albion, Charlton Athletic, Swindon Town and Preston North End striker.
- 21 April 2015: Dave Walker, 73, former Burnley and Southampton defender.
- 24 April 2015: Ken Birch, 81, former Everton and Southampton right half.
- 27 April 2015: Chris Turner, 64, former Peterborough United, Luton Town, Cambridge United. Swindon Town and Southend United defender who also managed Cambridge United and Peterborough United.
- 29 April 2015: Gary Liddell, 60, former Leeds United, Grimsby Town and Doncaster Rovers forward.
- 1 May 2015: Colin Whitaker, 82, former Sheffield Wednesday, Bradford Park Avenue, Shrewsbury Town, Queens Park Rangers, Rochdale, Oldham Athletic and Barrow winger.
- 11 May 2015: John Hewie, 87, former Scotland and Charlton Athletic left back.
- 21 May 2015: Ernie Hannigan, 72, former Preston North End, Coventry City and Torquay United outside right.
- 21 May 2015: Alan Woodward, 68, former Sheffield United winger.
- 27 May 2015: Andy King, 58, former Luton Town, Everton, Queens Park Rangers, West Bromwich Albion, Wolverhampton Wanderers and Aldershot midfielder, who also managed Mansfield Town and Swindon Town.
- 30 May 2015: Tony McNamara, 85, former Everton, Liverpool, Crewe Alexandra and Bury winger.

== Retirements ==
- 13 June 2014: David Bentley, 29, former England, Arsenal, Blackburn Rovers and Tottenham Hotspur midfielder.
- 19 June 2014: Phil Bolland, 37, former Oxford United, Peterborough United, Chester City and Wrexham defender.
- 25 June 2014: Danny Carlton, 30, former Carlisle United, Bury and Morecambe striker.
- 25 June 2014: Mike Pollitt, 42, former Lincoln City, Darlington, Notts County, Rotherham United, Chesterfield and Wigan Athletic goalkeeper.
- June 2014: Josh Low, 35, former Bristol Rovers, Leyton Orient, Cardiff City, Oldham Athletic, Northampton Town, Leicester City, Peterborough United and Cheltenham Town midfielder.
- 1 July 2014: Gary Alexander, 34, former Swindon Town, Hull City, Leyton Orient, Millwall, Brentford, Crawley Town and Burton Albion striker.
- 4 July 2014: Guy Branston, 35, former Rotherham United, Sheffield Wednesday, Oldham Athletic, Peterborough United, Notts County, Burton Albion, Torquay United, Bradford City, Aldershot Town and Plymouth Argyle defender.
- 17 July 2014: Martin Petrov, 35, former Bulgaria, Manchester City and Bolton Wanderers midfielder.
- 21 July 2014: Leon Cort, 34, former Southend United, Hull City, Crystal Palace, Stoke City, Burnley and Charlton Athletic defender.
- 22 July 2014: Dave Kitson, 34, former Cambridge United, Reading, Stoke City, Portsmouth, Sheffield United and Oxford United striker.
- 27 August 2014: Manuel Almunia, 37, former Arsenal and Watford goalkeeper.
- 22 September 2014: Adam Drury, 36, former Peterborough United, Norwich City and Leeds United defender.
- 16 October 2014: William Gallas, 37, former France, Chelsea, Arsenal and Tottenham Hotspur defender.
- 18 October 2014: Nick Culkin, 36, former Manchester United and Queens Park Rangers goalkeeper.
- 28 October 2014: Chris Iwelumo, 36, former Scotland, Stoke City, Colchester United, Charlton Athletic, Wolverhampton Wanderers, Burnley and Watford forward.
- 29 October 2014: Clive Platt, 37, former Walsall, Rochdale, Notts County, Peterborough United, Milton Keynes Dons, Colchester United, Coventry City, Northampton Town and Bury forward.
- 19 November 2014: Peter Løvenkrands, 34, former Denmark, Newcastle United and Birmingham City forward.
- 1 December 2014: Byron Anthony, 30, former Cardiff City, Bristol Rovers, Hereford United and Newport County defender.
- 3 December 2014: Matthew Etherington, 33, former Peterborough United, Tottenham Hotspur, West Ham United and Stoke City midfielder.
- 16 December 2014: Thierry Henry, 37, former France and Arsenal striker, who holds the record number of goals scored for Arsenal.
- 18 December 2014: Gary Doherty, 34, former Republic of Ireland, Luton Town, Tottenham Hotspur, Norwich City, Charlton Athletic and Wycombe Wanderers defender/striker.
- 29 January 2015: Lloyd Owusu, 38, former Ghana, Brentford, Sheffield Wednesday, Reading, Yeovil Town, Cheltenham Town and Barnet forward.
- 3 February 2015: Eddie Oshodi, 23, former Watford defender.
- 28 February 2015: Gary Caldwell, 32, former Scotland and Wigan Athletic defender.
- 2 March 2015: Jordan Seabright, 20, former AFC Bournemouth and Dagenham & Redbridge goalkeeper.
- 3 March 2015: Bradley Orr, 32, former Bristol City, Queens Park Rangers and Blackburn Rovers defender.
- 7 March 2015: David Connolly, 37, former Republic of Ireland, Watford, Wimbledon, West Ham United, Leicester City, Wigan Athletic, Sunderland, Southampton, Portsmouth and AFC Wimbledon striker.
- 8 April 2015: Barry Ferguson, 37, former Scotland, Blackburn Rovers, Birmingham City and Blackpool midfielder.
- 23 April 2015: Marc Tierney, 29, former Oldham Athletic, Shrewsbury Town, Colchester United, Norwich City and Bolton Wanderers defender
- 2 May 2015: Richard Lee, 32, former Watford and Brentford goalkeeper.
- 2 May 2015: Stewart Drummond, 39, former Chester City, Shrewsbury Town and Morecambe midfielder, who is Morecambe's record appearance holder in the Football League.
- 2 May 2015: Kevin Miller, 46, former Exeter City, Birmingham City, Watford, Crystal Palace, Barnsley, Bristol Rovers and Southampton goalkeeper.
- 7 May 2015: Russell Anderson, 36, former Scotland, Sunderland and Derby County defender.
- 12 May 2015: Andy Whing, 30, former Coventry City, Brighton & Hove Albion, Leyton Orient and Oxford United defender.
- 14 May 2015: Chris Sedgwick, 35, former Rotherham United, Preston North End, Sheffield Wednesday, Scunthorpe United and Bury midfielder.
- 24 May 2015: Brad Friedel, 44, former USA, Liverpool, Blackburn Rovers, Aston Villa and Tottenham Hotspur goalkeeper.
- 24 May 2015: Steven Reid, 34, former Republic of Ireland, Millwall, Blackburn Rovers, West Bromwich Albion and Burnley utility player.
- 26 May 2015: Kevin O'Connor, 33, former Brentford utility player, who spent over 16 years at Griffin Park.
- 30 May 2015: Rio Ferdinand, 36, former England, West Ham United, Leeds United, Manchester United and Queens Park Rangers defender, who also captained England on a number of occasions.
