= William Dodd =

William Dodd may refer to:

- William Dodd (ambassador) (1869–1940), U.S. ambassador to Nazi Germany from 1933 to 1937
- William E. Dodd Jr. (1905–1952), U.S. leftist politician, New Dealer, and possible Soviet sympathizer
- William Dodd (priest) (1729–1777), English clergyman, the last man to be hanged for forgery in 1777
- William J. Dodd (1862–1930), American architect
- William Huston Dodd (1844–1930), member of parliament for North Tyrone
- William Schauffler Dodd (1860–1928), American Christian medical missionary
- William Dodd (cricketer) (1908–1993), English cricketer
- William Dodd (writer) (1804–?), child laborer and working class writer in Britain and later, the USA
- William Dodd (fiction), fictional character in the Richard Sharpe series of novels
- Bill Dodd (Louisiana politician) (1909–1991), Louisiana politician and writer
- Bill Dodd (California politician) (born 1956)
- Bill Dodd (footballer) (1936–2015), English professional footballer
- SS William E. Dodd, a Liberty ship

== See also ==
- William Dodds (1885–?), English footballer
- Bill Dodds (1882–1934), Australian rules footballer
- Billy Dodds (born 1969), Scottish footballer
