= UEFA Euro 2016 qualifying Group E =

European football competition

The UEFA Euro 2016 qualifying Group E was one of nine groups drawn to decide which teams would qualify for the UEFA Euro 2016 finals tournament. Group E consisted of six teams: England, Switzerland, Slovenia, Estonia, Lithuania, and San Marino, who played against each other home-and-away in a round-robin format.

The top two teams, England and Switzerland, qualified directly for the finals. As third-placed Slovenia were not the highest-ranked among all third-placed teams, they advanced to the play-offs, where they lost to Ukraine and thus failed to qualify.

England won all ten of their matches becoming only the fifth national side to qualify for a European Championship with a 100% record, and the sixth instance, after France (1992 and 2004), Czech Republic (2000), Germany and Spain (both 2012).

== Standings ==
Pos	Team	Pld	W	D	L	GF	GA	GD	Pts	Qualification	(England)	(Switzerland)	(Slovenia)	(Estonia)	(Lithuania)	(San Marino)
1	England	10	10	0	0	31	3	+28	30	Qualify for final tournament	—	2–0	3–1	2–0	4–0	5–0
2	Switzerland	10	7	0	3	24	8	+16	21	Qualify for final tournament	0–2	—	3–2	3–0	4–0	7–0
3	Slovenia	10	5	1	4	18	11	+7	16	Advance to play-offs	2–3	1–0	—	1–0	1–1	6–0
4	Estonia	10	3	1	6	4	9	−5	10 (Note: Tied on head-to-head results. Overall goal difference was used as the tiebreaker.)		0–1	0–1	1–0	—	1–0	2–0
5	Lithuania	10	3	1	6	7	18	−11	10		0–3	1–2	0–2	1–0	—	2–1
6	San Marino	10	0	1	9	1	36	−35	1		0–6	0–4	0–2	0–0	0–2	—

Source: UEFA
Rules for classification: Qualification tiebreakers

== Matches ==
The fixtures were released by UEFA the same day as the draw, which was held on 23 February 2014 in Nice. Times are CET/CEST, (Note: CET (UTC+1) for matches on 15 November 2014 and 27 March 2015, and CEST (UTC+2) for all other matches.) as listed by UEFA (local times are in parentheses).

8 September 2014
20:45
(21:45 UTC+3)

Estonia	1–0	Slovenia
Purje 86'	Report

A. Le Coq Arena, Tallinn
Attendance: 6,561
Referee: Szymon Marciniak (Poland)
8 September 2014
20:45
(20:45 UTC+2)

San Marino	0–2	Lithuania
	Report	Matulevičius 5'; Novikovas 36'

San Marino Stadium, Serravalle
Attendance: 986
Referee: Libor Kovařík (Czech Republic)
8 September 2014
20:45
(20:45 UTC+2)

Switzerland	0–2	England
	Report	Welbeck 58', 90+4'

St. Jakob-Park, Basel
Attendance: 35,500
Referee: Cüneyt Çakır (Turkey)

9 October 2014
20:45
(19:45 UTC+1)

England	5–0	San Marino
Jagielka 25'; Rooney 43' (pen.); Welbeck 49'; Townsend 72'; Della Valle 78' (o.g.)	Report

Wembley Stadium, London
Attendance: 55,990
Referee: Marcin Borski (Poland)
9 October 2014
20:45
(21:45 UTC+3)

Lithuania	1–0	Estonia
Mikoliūnas 76'	Report

LFF Stadium, Vilnius
Attendance: 4,780
Referee: Carlos Clos Gómez (Spain)
9 October 2014
20:45
(20:45 UTC+2)

Slovenia	1–0	Switzerland
Novaković 79' (pen.)	Report

Ljudski vrt, Maribor
Attendance: 8,500
Referee: Wolfgang Stark (Germany)

12 October 2014
18:00
(19:00 UTC+3)

Estonia	0–1	England
	Report	Rooney 74'

A. Le Coq Arena, Tallinn
Attendance: 10,195
Referee: Marijo Strahonja (Croatia)
12 October 2014
20:45
(21:45 UTC+3)

Lithuania	0–2	Slovenia
	Report	Novaković 33', 37'

LFF Stadium, Vilnius
Attendance: 4,250
Referee: Michael Koukoulakis (Greece)
14 October 2014
20:45
(20:45 UTC+2)

San Marino	0–4	Switzerland
	Report	Seferovic 10', 23'; Džemaili 30'; Shaqiri 79'

San Marino Stadium, Serravalle
Attendance: 2,289
Referee: Tony Chapron (France)

15 November 2014
18:00
(17:00 UTC±0)

England	3–1	Slovenia
Rooney 59' (pen.); Welbeck 66', 72'	Report	Henderson 58' (o.g.)

Wembley Stadium, London
Attendance: 82,309
Referee: Olegário Benquerença (Portugal)
15 November 2014
18:00
(18:00 UTC+1)

San Marino	0–0	Estonia
	Report

San Marino Stadium, Serravalle
Attendance: 759
Referee: Felix Brych (Germany)
15 November 2014
20:45
(20:45 UTC+1)

Switzerland	4–0	Lithuania
Arlauskis 66' (o.g.); Schär 68'; Shaqiri 80', 90'	Report

AFG Arena, St. Gallen
Attendance: 17,300
Referee: Svein Oddvar Moen (Norway)

27 March 2015
20:45
(19:45 UTC±0)

England	4–0	Lithuania
Rooney 6'; Welbeck 45'; Sterling 58'; Kane 73'	Report

Wembley Stadium, London
Attendance: 83,671
Referee: Pavel Královec (Czech Republic)
27 March 2015
20:45
(20:45 UTC+1)

Slovenia	6–0	San Marino
Iličić 10'; Kampl 49'; Struna 50'; Novaković 52'; Lazarević 73'; Ilić 88'	Report

Stožice Stadium, Ljubljana
Attendance: 8,325
Referee: Oliver Drachta (Austria)
27 March 2015
20:45
(20:45 UTC+1)

Switzerland	3–0	Estonia
Schär 17'; Xhaka 27'; Seferovic 80'	Report

Swissporarena, Lucerne
Attendance: 14,500
Referee: Danny Makkelie (Netherlands)

14 June 2015
18:00
(19:00 UTC+3)

Estonia	2–0	San Marino
Zenjov 35', 63'	Report

A. Le Coq Arena, Tallinn
Attendance: 6,131
Referee: Ivan Kružliak (Slovakia)
14 June 2015
18:00
(18:00 UTC+2)

Slovenia	2–3	England
Novaković 37'; Pečnik 84'	Report	Wilshere 57', 73'; Rooney 86'

Stožice Stadium, Ljubljana
Attendance: 15,796
Referee: Alberto Undiano Mallenco (Spain)
14 June 2015
20:45
(21:45 UTC+3)

Lithuania	1–2	Switzerland
Černych 64'	Report	Drmić 69'; Shaqiri 84'

LFF Stadium, Vilnius
Attendance: 4,786
Referee: Craig Thomson (Scotland)

5 September 2015
18:00
(19:00 UTC+3)

Estonia	1–0	Lithuania
Vassiljev 71'	Report

A. Le Coq Arena, Tallinn
Attendance: 6,621
Referee: Oliver Drachta (Austria)
5 September 2015
18:00
(18:00 UTC+2)

San Marino	0–6	England
	Report	Rooney 13' (pen.); Brolli 30' (o.g.); Barkley 46'; Walcott 68', 78'; Kane 77'

San Marino Stadium, Serravalle
Attendance: 4,378
Referee: Leontios Trattou (Cyprus)
5 September 2015
20:45
(20:45 UTC+2)

Switzerland	3–2	Slovenia
Drmić 80', 90+4'; Stocker 84'	Report	Novaković 45'; Cesar 48'

St. Jakob-Park, Basel
Attendance: 25,750
Referee: Pavel Královec (Czech Republic)

8 September 2015
20:45
(19:45 UTC+1)

England	2–0	Switzerland
Kane 67'; Rooney 84' (pen.)	Report

Wembley Stadium, London
Attendance: 75,751
Referee: Gianluca Rocchi (Italy)
8 September 2015
20:45
(21:45 UTC+3)

Lithuania	2–1	San Marino
Černych 7'; Spalvis 90+2'	Report	M. Vitaioli 55'

LFF Stadium, Vilnius
Attendance: 2,856
Referee: Clayton Pisani (Malta)
8 September 2015
20:45
(20:45 UTC+2)

Slovenia	1–0	Estonia
Berić 63'	Report

Ljudski vrt, Maribor
Attendance: 6,868
Referee: Anastasios Sidiropoulos (Greece)

9 October 2015
20:45
(19:45 UTC+1)

England	2–0	Estonia
Walcott 45'; Sterling 85'	Report

Wembley Stadium, London
Attendance: 75,427
Referee: István Vad (Hungary)
9 October 2015
20:45
(20:45 UTC+2)

Slovenia	1–1	Lithuania
Birsa 45+1' (pen.)	Report	Novikovas 79' (pen.)

Stožice Stadium, Ljubljana
Attendance: 10,498
Referee: Björn Kuipers (Netherlands)
9 October 2015
20:45
(20:45 UTC+2)

Switzerland	7–0	San Marino
Lang 17'; Inler 55' (pen.); Mehmedi 65'; Djourou 72' (pen.); Kasami 75'; Embolo 80' (pen.); Derdiyok 89'	Report

AFG Arena, St. Gallen
Attendance: 16,200
Referee: Mattias Gestranius (Finland)

12 October 2015
20:45
(21:45 UTC+3)

Estonia	0–1	Switzerland
	Report	Klavan 90+4' (o.g.)

A. Le Coq Arena, Tallinn
Attendance: 7,304
Referee: Pol van Boekel (Netherlands)
12 October 2015
20:45
(21:45 UTC+3)

Lithuania	0–3	England
	Report	Barkley 29'; Arlauskis 35' (o.g.); Oxlade-Chamberlain 62'

LFF Stadium, Vilnius
Attendance: 5,051
Referee: Kenn Hansen (Denmark)
12 October 2015
20:45
(20:45 UTC+2)

San Marino	0–2	Slovenia
	Report	Cesar 54'; Pečnik 75'

San Marino Stadium, Serravalle
Attendance: 781
Referee: Aleksandar Stavrev (Macedonia)

== Goalscorers ==
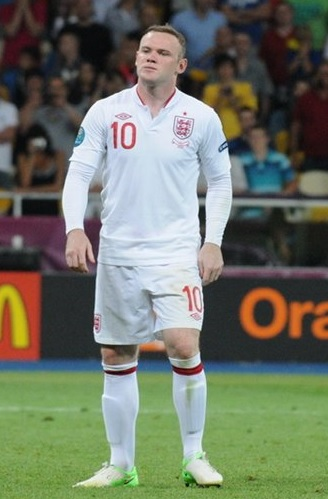
England's Wayne Rooney was the group's top scorer, with seven goals

There were 85 goals scored in 30 matches, for an average of 2.83 goals per match.

7 goals

- (England national football team) Wayne Rooney

6 goals

- (England national football team) Danny Welbeck
- (Slovenia national football team) Milivoje Novaković

4 goals

- (Switzerland national football team) Xherdan Shaqiri

3 goals

- (England national football team) Harry Kane
- (England national football team) Theo Walcott
- (Switzerland national football team) Josip Drmić
- (Switzerland national football team) Haris Seferović

2 goals

- (England national football team) Ross Barkley
- (England national football team) Raheem Sterling
- (England national football team) Jack Wilshere
- (Estonia national football team) Sergei Zenjov
- (Lithuania national football team) Fedor Černych
- (Lithuania national football team) Arvydas Novikovas
- (Slovenia national football team) Boštjan Cesar
- (Slovenia national football team) Nejc Pečnik
- (Switzerland national football team) Fabian Schär

1 goal

- (England national football team) Phil Jagielka
- (England national football team) Alex Oxlade-Chamberlain
- (England national football team) Andros Townsend
- (Estonia national football team) Ats Purje
- (Estonia national football team) Konstantin Vassiljev
- (Lithuania national football team) Deivydas Matulevičius
- (Lithuania national football team) Saulius Mikoliūnas
- (Lithuania national football team) Lukas Spalvis
- (San Marino national football team) Matteo Vitaioli
- (Slovenia national football team) Robert Berić
- (Slovenia national football team) Valter Birsa
- (Slovenia national football team) Branko Ilić
- (Slovenia national football team) Josip Iličić
- (Slovenia national football team) Kevin Kampl
- (Slovenia national football team) Dejan Lazarević
- (Slovenia national football team) Andraž Struna
- (Switzerland national football team) Eren Derdiyok
- (Switzerland national football team) Johan Djourou
- (Switzerland national football team) Blerim Džemaili
- (Switzerland national football team) Breel Embolo
- (Switzerland national football team) Gökhan Inler
- (Switzerland national football team) Pajtim Kasami
- (Switzerland national football team) Michael Lang
- (Switzerland national football team) Admir Mehmedi
- (Switzerland national football team) Valentin Stocker
- (Switzerland national football team) Granit Xhaka

1 own goal

- (England national football team) Jordan Henderson (against Slovenia)
- (Estonia national football team) Ragnar Klavan (against Switzerland)
- (San Marino national football team) Cristian Brolli (against England)
- (San Marino national football team) Alessandro Della Valle (against England)

2 own goals

- (Lithuania national football team) Giedrius Arlauskis (against England & Switzerland)

== Discipline ==
A player was automatically suspended for the next match for the following offences:

- Receiving a red card (red card suspensions could be extended for serious offences)
- Receiving three yellow cards in three different matches, as well as after fifth and any subsequent yellow card (yellow card suspensions were carried forward to the play-offs, but not the finals or any other future international matches)

The following suspensions were served during the qualifying matches:

Team	Player	Offence(s)	Suspended for match(es)
Estonia	Ken Kallaste	(yellow card) (yellow-red card) vs Lithuania (9 October 2014)	vs England (12 October 2014)
Estonia	Ragnar Klavan	(yellow card) (yellow-red card) vs England (12 October 2014)	vs San Marino (15 November 2014)
Estonia	Aleksandr Dmitrijev	(yellow card) vs San Marino (15 November 2014); (yellow card) vs Switzerland (27 March 2015); (yellow card) vs Lithuania (5 September 2015)	vs Slovenia (8 September 2015)
Lithuania	Giedrius Arlauskis	(red card) vs San Marino (8 September 2015)	vs Slovenia (9 October 2015)
Lithuania	Marius Žaliūkas	(yellow card) vs England (27 March 2015); (yellow card) vs Estonia (5 September 2015); (yellow card) vs Slovenia (9 October 2015)	vs England (12 October 2015)
San Marino	Alessandro Della Valle	(yellow card) (yellow-red card) vs Ukraine (15 October 2013) (Note: The suspension was carried over from the 2014 FIFA World Cup qualification.)	vs Lithuania (8 September 2014)
San Marino	Mirko Palazzi	(red card) vs Ukraine (15 October 2013)	vs Lithuania (8 September 2014)
San Marino	Manuel Battistini	(yellow card) vs Lithuania (8 September 2014); (yellow card) vs Estonia (14 June 2015); (yellow card) vs Lithuania (8 September 2015)	vs Switzerland (9 October 2015)
San Marino	Nicola Chiaruzzi	(yellow card) (yellow-red card) vs Lithuania (8 September 2015)	vs Switzerland (9 October 2015)
Slovenia	Dalibor Stevanović	(yellow card) (yellow-red card) vs Estonia (8 September 2014)	vs Switzerland (9 October 2014)
Slovenia	Kevin Kampl	(yellow card) vs England (14 June 2015); (yellow card) vs Switzerland (5 September 2015); (yellow card) vs Estonia (8 September 2015)	vs Lithuania (9 October 2015)
