= Stuart C. Dodd =

American sociologist

Stuart Carter Dodd (1900–1975) was an American sociologist and an educator, who published research on the Middle East and on mathematical sociology, and was a proponent of scientific polling.

== Biography ==
Stuart C. Dodd was born in 1900 in Talas, Ottoman Empire. His father, William Schauffler Dodd, was a medical missionary there. He graduated from Princeton University in 1926 with a degree in psychology. He began his career as professor of Sociology and Director of the Social Science Research Section of the American University of Beirut. During World War II, Dodd directed opinion survey work for the Allied Expeditionary Forces in Sicily and the Near East.

After the war in 1947, Dodd was appointed Professor of Sociology at the University of Washington and director of the newly created Public Opinion Laboratory, the precursor for the Institute For Sociological Research at the University of Washington, where he remained until 1961. End 1950s he was among the first members of the Society for General Systems Research. He further served on the board of the Forum Foundations, which conducted futures research in the field of Administrative Theory and Many-to-Many Communication technology.

He was a Fellow of the National Research Council and the Rockefeller Foundation.

== Work ==
Dodd was a leading expert on typical statistical polling as head of the Washington State Public Opinion Laboratory at the University of Washington in the 1960s. He was the only pollster to accurately predict, that U.S. President Harry S. Truman would defeat Governor Thomas E. Dewey and was called to testify before Congress as to how that all happened.

=== Bogardus Scale ===
In 1954 Dodd and Nehnevasja became known for their introduction of precise metric distances into the Bogardus scale. According to Ethington, "revising some of the Bogardus response items and converting each to a power of 10 meters, they captured an almost convincing, common-sense physical distance for each item. Dodd and Nehnevasja had no intention of restoring geometric distance to any kind of constitutive role in the social process. Their sole objective, in fact, was to find an even more objective, trans-spatial metric".

== Publications ==
He authored several textbooks for the university's curriculum, most notably

- 1931, Social Relationships in the Near East
- 1934, A Controlled Experiment on Rural Hygiene in Syria
- 1936, The Standard Error of a 'Social Force
- 1942, Dimensions of Society: A Quantitative Systematics For the Social Sciences
- 1943, A Pioneer Radio Poll in Lebanon, Syria and Palestine
- 1947, Systematic Social Science: A Dimensional Sociology

Articles

- 1927. "On criteria for factorising correlated variables". In: Biometrika 1927 19(1–2). pp. 45–52.
- 1947. "The World Association for Public Opinion Research". In: Public Opinion Quarterly, Vol. 21, No. 1, Anniversary Issue Devoted to Twenty Years of Public Opinion Research (Spring, 1957), pp. 179–184.
- 1952. "Model English for Mechanical Translation: An Example of a National Language Regularized for Electronic Translators".
- 1973. "Techniques for Obtaining Rank Orderings". With: J. David Mart. In: Sociological Methods & Research, Vol. 1, No. 3, 317–327.
- 1976. A Scientific Foundation for World Culture. With Burt Webb.
