= Martha Dodd =

American spy for the Soviet Union

- Born: Martha Eccles Dodd; October 8, 1908; Ashland, Virginia, US
- Died: August 10, 1990 (aged 81); Prague, Czechoslovakia
- Education: Attended University of Chicago
- Known for: espionage, writing
- Notable work: Through Embassy Eyes (1939 memoir); Sowing the Wind (1945 novel); The Searching Light (1955 novel)
- Spouse(s): George Bassett Roberts (m. 1932; div. 1934) Alfred K. Stern (m. 1938; died 1986)
- Children: Robert
- Parent(s): William Edward Dodd; Martha Ida "Mattie" Johns
- Relatives: William E. Dodd, Jr.

Martha Eccles Dodd (October 8, 1908 – August 10, 1990) was an American journalist and novelist. The daughter of William Edward Dodd, US President Franklin Delano Roosevelt's first Ambassador to Germany, Dodd lived in Berlin from 1933–1937 and was a witness to the rise of the Third Reich. She became involved in left-wing politics after she witnessed first-hand the violence of the Nazi state. With her second husband, Alfred Stern Jr., she engaged in espionage for the Soviet Union from before World War II until the height of the Cold War.

== Life and career ==
Martha Dodd was born in Ashland, Virginia. She studied at the University of Chicago and also for a time in Washington, D.C., and Paris. She served briefly as assistant literary editor of the Chicago Tribune. In 1933, President Franklin D. Roosevelt appointed her father, the historian William Dodd, as the American ambassador to Germany and the Dodd family arrived in Berlin in August 1933. On 30 August 1933, Ambassador Dodd arrived at the Reichspräsidentenpalais to present his credentials to President Paul von Hindenburg as the ambassador of the United States to the German Reich, which were accepted.

Dodd and her brother, William E. Dodd, Jr., accompanied their parents to Berlin when her father took up the post of U.S. Ambassador. She initially found the Nazi movement attractive. She later wrote that she "became temporarily an ardent defender of everything going on" and admired the "glowing and inspiring faith in Hitler, the good that was being done for the unemployed." She made a number of friends in high circles, and Ernst Hanfstaengl, her sometime lover and an aide to Adolf Hitler, tried to encourage a romantic relationship between Hitler and Dodd. Dodd found Hitler "excessively gentle and modest in his manners"; no romance followed their meeting. She had numerous relationships while in Berlin, including with Ernst Udet and with French diplomat Armand Berard, later France's ambassador to the United Nations. Berard in a letter to her stated: "You are the only person in the world who can break me, but how well you know it and how you seem to rejoice in doing so. I can't stand it. If you realized how unhappy I am, you would pity me".

Other lovers included Max Delbrück and Rudolf Diels. Dodd was greatly helped by the fact that both her parents went to bed early, and were unaware of her relationships. When the writer Thomas Wolfe visited Berlin, he had a torrid romance with Dodd. Wolfe recalled that during his time in Berlin, Dodd was "like a butterfly hovering around my penis". Several American diplomats at the embassy in Berlin reported to Washington that Martha Dodd's relationships were the subject of much gossip in Berlin, and urged that Ambassador Dodd be recalled as his daughter's behavior was damaging the image of the United States in the Reich. In September 1933, Martha Dodd first met a young Soviet diplomat, Boris Vinogradov, at a dance in Berlin. Dodd later recalled: "Incredible as it sounds, I had the sensation after he left that air around me was more luminous and vibrant".

Following the Night of the Long Knives, Dodd changed her views on the Nazis. People in her social circle were begging the Americans for help and the Dodd family found its phones tapped and their servants enlisted as spies. Her mother wrote that Dodd "got into a nervous state that almost bordered on the hysterical [and] had terrible nightmares".

In March 1934, the NKVD ordered intelligence officer Boris Vinogradov (under diplomatic cover in Berlin as press attache) to recruit his lover, Dodd, as an agent. In 1935, Marguerite Young interviewed Dodd's father, at his request, for the CPUSA-controlled Daily Worker, agreeing to meet Young because she already knew Martha. Young wrote of Dodd, "his daughter, whom I'd met and liked, an attractive young woman, light yellow hair, large black velvet bow at the nape of her neck."

Vinogradov and Dodd began a romantic relationship that lasted for years, even after he left Berlin; in 1936 they asked Joseph Stalin for permission to marry. Dodd agreed to spy for the Soviet Union. Other case officers soon replaced Vinogradov and Dodd worked with each of them while hoping to reconnect with Vinogradov. (Vinogradov was executed in approximately 1938, during the Great Purge.) Dodd informed the Soviets of secret embassy and State Department business and provided details of her father's reports to the State Department. As part of her cover, she maintained a romantic relationship with Louis Ferdinand. Anticipating her father's retirement from his Berlin post, she tried to learn the Soviets' preferred replacement for him as U.S. Ambassador and told the NKVD leadership, "If this man has at least a slight chance, I will persuade my father to promote his candidacy." After the Dodds left Germany in December, 1937, Iskhak Akhmerov, NKVD rezident in New York City, managed her espionage work.

In Summer 1938, while still romantically involved with the filmmaker Sidney Kaufman, with whom she lived for several months, Dodd married New York millionaire Alfred K. Stern Jr. According to Dodd, Stern was prepared to contribute $50,000 to the Democratic Party to secure an ambassadorship. The Soviets viewed Dodd as a valuable but uncertain asset. One assessment was, "A gifted, clever and educated woman, she requires constant control over her behavior." Another assessment was, "She considers herself a Communist and claims to accept the party's program. In reality [she] is a typical representative of American bohemia, a sexually decayed woman ready to sleep with any handsome man." In a February 5, 1942, letter, Dodd told her Soviet contacts that her husband should be brought into their network. With their approval, she approached her husband and reported that he responded with enthusiasm: "He wanted to do something immediately. He felt he had many contacts that could be valuable in this sort of work." Stern established a music publishing house that served as a cover for routing information to the Soviet Union. Dodd and Stern proved of little value to the Soviets beyond providing the publishing house cover and occasionally recommending someone as a potential agent. As part of the Soble spy ring, Miss Dodd (code named Liza) recommended Jane Foster to infiltrate the OSS.

In 1939, Dodd published a memoir of her years in Berlin, Through Embassy Eyes. It included extravagant praise of the Soviet Union based in her travels there. With her brother as co-editor, she published her father's Berlin diaries, Ambassador Dodd's Diary, 1933–1938.

Her 1945 novel, Sowing the Wind, described the moral deterioration of decent Germans under Hitler. It was "not much esteemed as a work of fiction," but became a best-seller in translation in the Soviet sector of Berlin in 1949.

The FBI had Dodd under surveillance by 1948. Contacts between Dodd and Stern and NKGB lapsed in 1949. In 1955, Dodd published The Searching Light, a defense of academic freedom that told the story of a professor under pressure to sign a loyalty oath.

In July 1956, subpoenaed to testify in several espionage cases, Dodd and Stern fled to Prague via Mexico with their nine-year-old adopted son Robert. They later applied for and were denied Soviet citizenship. Boris Morros implicated Dodd and Stern in 1957 as Soviet agents as part of his exposure of the Soble spy network. The Soviets then allowed them to emigrate to Moscow just as they were convicted of espionage by a U.S. court.

A KGB document, dated October 1975, noted that the Sterns spent 1963–1970 in Cuba. In the 1970s, apparently disappointed with their lives in the Soviet Union, they tried without success to have their American attorney negotiate their return to the U.S. The KGB monitored the negotiations and had no objections, since their knowledge of espionage activities was outdated or had been revealed by Morros.

In 1979, the U.S. Department of Justice dropped charges against Dodd and her husband related to the Soble case. Alfred Stern died of cancer on July 24, 1986, in Prague. Martha Dodd died on August 10, 1990, in Prague.

Her letters were deposited at the Library of Congress. Her FBI file contained 10,400 pages.

== Works ==
- Martha Dodd, Through Embassy Eyes (NY: Harcourt, Brace, 1939), excerpt available, UK title: My Years in Germany
- Martha Dodd, Charles Austin Beard, eds., Ambassador Dodd's Diary, 1933–1938 (NY: Harcourt, Brace, 1941), OCLC 395068
- Martha Dodd, Sowing the Wind (NY: Harcourt, Brace, 1945)
- Martha Dodd, The Searching Light (NY: Citadel Press, 1955)
