= William Dodd (ambassador) =

American historian and ambassador to Germany (1869-1940)

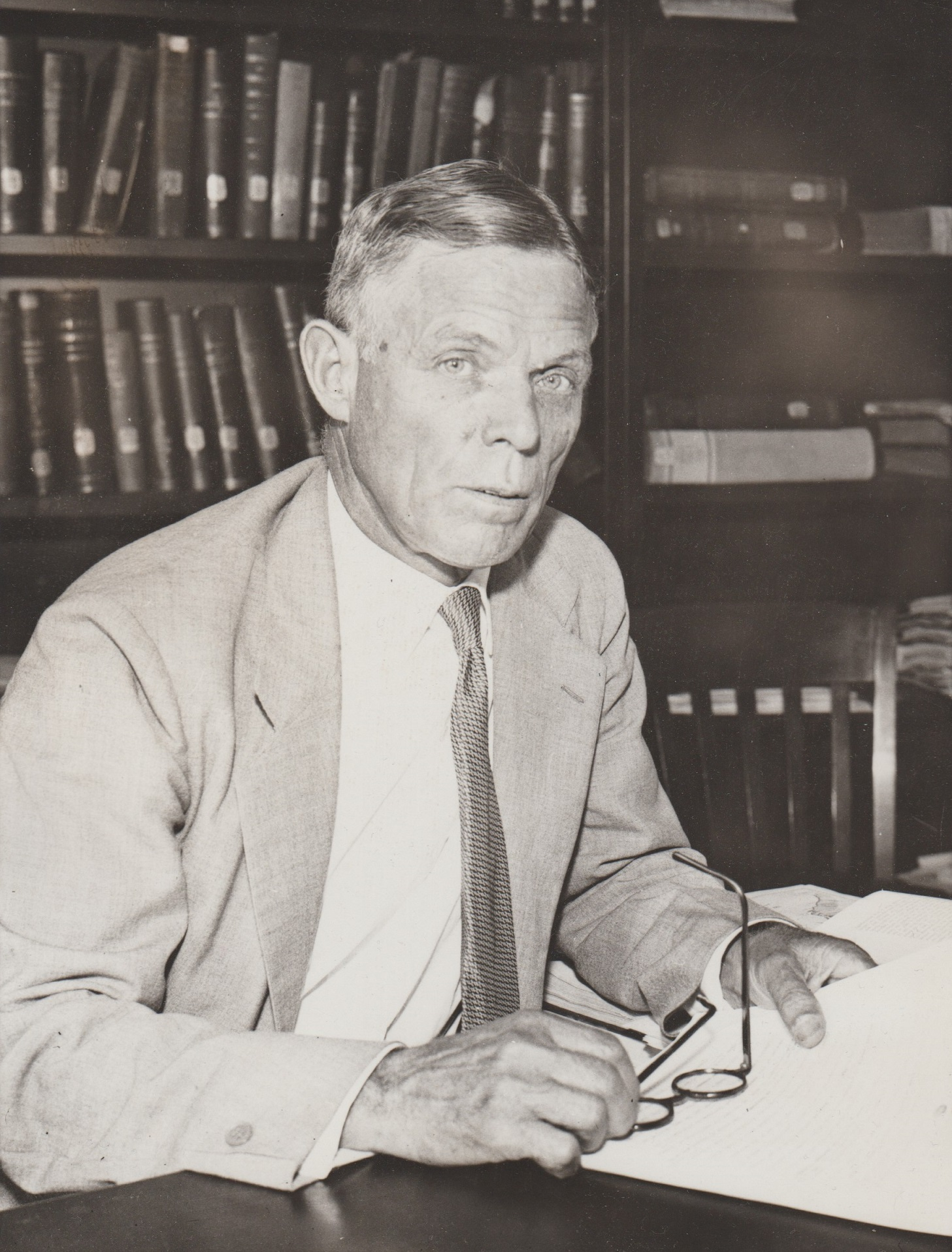
- International News Photos photograph of Professor Dodd, shortly after his nomination as Ambassador to Germany.

United States Ambassador to Germany
- In office August 30, 1933 – December 29, 1937
- President: Franklin D. Roosevelt
- Preceded by: Frederic M. Sackett
- Succeeded by: Hugh R. Wilson

Personal details
- Born: William Edward Dodd; October 21, 1869 Clayton, North Carolina, U.S.
- Died: February 9, 1940 (aged 70) Round Hill, Loudoun County, Virginia, U.S.
- Resting place: Rock Creek Cemetery; Washington, D.C., U.S.
- Party: Democratic
- Spouse: Martha Ida "Mattie" Johns (m. 1901; died 1938)
- Children: Bill, Martha
- Parents: John D. Dodd; Evelyn Creech
- Education: Virginia Agricultural and Mechanical College (BA, MA); University of Leipzig (PhD)
- Occupation: Historian; Diplomat

William Edward Dodd (October 21, 1869 – February 9, 1940) was an American historian, author and diplomat. A liberal Democrat, he served as the United States Ambassador to Germany from 1933 to 1937 during the Nazi era. Initially a holder of the slightly antisemitic notions of his times, he went to Germany with instructions from President Franklin D. Roosevelt to do what he could to protest Nazi treatment of Jews in Germany "unofficially", while also attempting to follow official State Department instructions to maintain cordial official diplomatic relations. Convinced from firsthand observation that the Nazis were an increasing threat, he resigned over his inability to mobilize the Roosevelt administration, particularly the State Department, to counter the Nazis prior to the start of World War II.

== Early and family life and education ==
"Willie" Dodd was born on October 21, 1869, on a farm near Clayton, Johnston County, North Carolina, the eldest of eight children born to farmer John Daniel Dodd (1848–1941) and his first wife, the former Evaline Creech (1848–1909). His paternal English or Scottish ancestors had lived in America since the 1740s when Daniel Dodd settled among the Highland Scots in the Cape Fear Valley. The family included four younger brothers: Rev. Walter Henley Dodd (1872–1950), Alonzo Lewis Dodd (1875–1952), John Ivan Dodd (1876–1971), and Eff David Dodd (1884–1966). Of his three sisters, only Martha "Mattie" (Martha Ella) Dodd (born 1878) survived long enough to marry.

After graduating from Clayton High School, Dodd attended Oak Ridge Military Academy to prepare for college. He was unable to secure an appointment to the U.S. Military Academy or at the University of North Carolina, and so taught at local schools until 1891, when he enrolled at the Virginia Polytechnic Institute (Virginia Tech). Dodd received his bachelor's degree in 1895 and a master's degree in 1897, by which time he had begun teaching undergraduates. On a colleague's advice, Dodd traveled to Germany and earned his PhD at the University of Leipzig in 1900, based on a thesis (in German) concerning Thomas Jefferson's 1796 return to politics following a three-year hiatus. Shortly after returning to the United States and resuming his teaching career, Dodd married Martha Johns at her family's home in nearby Wake County, North Carolina on December 25, 1901. They had two children, a daughter, Martha (1908–1990), and a son, William E. Dodd Jr. (1905–1952)

== Academic career ==
Dodd learned a class-conscious view of Southern history from his family, which taught him that slaveholders were responsible for the Civil War. His semi-literate and impoverished father supported his family only through the generosity of wealthier relatives, whom Dodd came to view as "hard men, those traders and aristocratic masters of their dependents".

Dodd taught history at Randolph–Macon College in Ashland, Hanover County, Virginia, from 1900 to 1908. His instruction there was at times controversial, because it included attacks on Southern aristocratic values and the "Lost Cause". In 1902, Dodd wrote an article in The Nation in which he complained of pressure to flatter Southern elites and their view that slavery played no role in the onset of the Civil War. He criticized the Grand Camp of Confederate Veterans by name. Confederate societies called for his dismissal. Dodd explained that "To suggest that the revolt from the union in 1860 was not justified, was not led by the most lofty minded statesmen, is to invite not only criticism but an enforced resignation." University administrators supported him and he attacked his accusers and detailed their distortions of Southern history. Recruited by the University of Chicago, Dodd began his 25-year career as Professor of American History there in 1908; he declined an offer from the University of California, Berkeley, the following year.

Dodd was the first (and for many years the only) college or university professor fully devoted to the history of the American South. He produced many scholarly works, both articles and books, and won excellent reviews as a teacher. Though much of his scholarship was later superseded, Dodd helped to model a new approach to regional history: sympathetic, judicious, and less partisan than the work of earlier generations. In a letter to President Theodore Roosevelt (whose maternal ancestors were from the South), Dodd described his approach: "The purpose of my studying and writing history is to strike a balance somewhat between the North and the South, but not to offer any defense of any thing." Dodd's most prominent works (other than relating to President Wilson as described below) included: The Life of Nathaniel Macon (1903), Jefferson Davis (1907), Statesmen of the Old South (1911), Expansion and Conflict (1915), The Cotton Kingdom: A Chronicle of the Old South (1919) and The Old South: Struggles for Democracy (1937).

A Democrat, Dodd became active in Chicago politics. In 1912 he wrote speeches for presidential candidate Woodrow Wilson, a Virginian and academic whose family had similarly experienced the devastating aftermath of the American Civil War. Dodd and Wilson became friends. Shortly after Wilson won the U.S. Presidential Election of 1912, Dodd bought a farm in the developing tourist and railroad community of Round Hill in Loudoun County, Virginia, about 50 miles from Washington, D.C. Dodd would visit President Wilson in the White House frequently, and authored a biography, Woodrow Wilson and his Work, that appeared in 1920. Dodd became an early opponent of the theory that German imperialism was solely responsible for World War I. He gave speeches on behalf of Wilson and U.S. participation in the League of Nations. In 1920 Dodd reviewed the League-related parts of the speech Ohio Governor James M. Cox gave when accepting the Democratic nomination for the presidency. Following Wilson's death, Dodd lectured on his administration and its accomplishments, revised his 1920 biography, and co-edited (with key aide Ray Stannard Baker) the six volumes of The Public Papers of Woodrow Wilson. Dodd defended Wilson in both scholarly journals and the popular press. Through these efforts, he developed connections to a number of figures in the Democratic Party establishment, including Josephus Daniels, Daniel C. Roper, and Edward M. House.

Dodd long planned to write a multi-volume history of the American South. As he reached his sixties, he found the prospect of completing it increasingly unlikely given his academic responsibilities. In addition to his responsibilities at the University of Chicago and later American University, Dodd held several positions as an officer of the American Historical Association and became that organization's president in 1934 (after his ambassadorial appointment described below). Moreover, the Southern Historical Association was founded in November 1934 and began to publish the Journal of Southern History soon thereafter. Dodd had previously received honorary doctorates from Emory University (1920), the University of Alabama (1923), and the University of Cincinnati (1929). In 1932, he declined an invitation to speak with the committee charged with selecting a president of the University of Virginia. In June 1934 some alumni touted Dodd as a possible successor to the president of the College of William and Mary. In 1935, Avery Odelle Craven edited a festschrift titled Essays in Honor of William E. Dodd By His Former Students at the University of Chicago, which included papers by Frank Lawrence Owsley and Maude Howlett Woodfin. Dodd was elected to the American Philosophical Society in 1936.

== Appointment as Ambassador to Germany ==
The Roosevelt administration had difficulty filling the post of U.S. Ambassador to Germany. The volatile political situation in Germany presented diplomatic challenges, but most observers expected German politics would stabilize before too long. The ambassadorship, normally a patronage position rather than one filled by a State Department professional, was offered to others, including James M. Cox and Newton D. Baker, both of whom declined citing personal reasons. With the administration under pressure to act before the adjournment of Congress, Secretary of Commerce Daniel C. Roper, a longtime friend of Dodd and his family, suggested his name after Dodd himself had made it clear he was seeking a diplomatic post that would allow him sufficient free time to complete his multi-volume history.

President Roosevelt offered Dodd the position on June 8, 1933, and sent the Senate his nomination two days later. He was confirmed the same day. Before his departure, Dodd's old friend Carl Sandburg told him he needed "to find out what this man Hitler is made of, what makes his brain go round, what his blood and bones are made of" and still "be brave and truthful, keep your poetry and integrity." Dodd left for Germany on July 5, 1933, accompanied by his wife and two adult children. His departure statements said:

The realities of the American past as well as the dilemma of the present reconcile me to the adventure I am about to undertake. Germany can hardly fail to realize the importance of friendly cooperation with the 120,000,000 people of the United States, and the United States can hardly fail to realize the value of social and economic cooperation with the land of Luther, Stein and Bismarck. Though difficulties lie ahead, one can hardly think that an honest, frank mission to Berlin can fail of good result.

== Service in Berlin ==
=== German debts ===
Before his departure for Berlin, State Department officials set as his priority the need to ensure that the German government did not default on its debts to American lenders. Dodd met with a group of bankers in New York City who recognized that economic conditions in Germany made full payment unlikely. They hoped he could argue against a German default and suggested they would agree to lower the interest on their loans from 7% to 4% to prevent it. National City Bank and Chase National Bank held over 100 million dollars in German bonds, which Germany later proposed to pay back at the rate of thirty cents on the dollar. Dodd was not sympathetic to the bankers or the high interest rates they charged.

Still, he repeatedly registered protests with the German government when payments were suspended or debts to United States lenders were treated differently from debts owed to those in other countries. Yet he remained fundamentally in sympathy with Germany's request that interest rates be lowered. As Secretary of State Hull insisted that Dodd renew his requests for payment, Dodd expressed frustration in his diary: "What more can I say than I have said a score of times? Germany is in a terrible plight and for once she recognizes war is no remedy."

=== Antisemitism ===
Before leaving to take up his post, Dodd consulted on the situation in Germany, and especially Nazi persecution of the Jews, with his own contacts and during interviews the State Department arranged for him. The opinions he heard covered a broad range. Charles Richard Crane, a plumbing industry tycoon and philanthropist, expressed great admiration for Hitler. As for the Jews, Crane said: "Let Hitler have his way." Some of the State Department's most senior officials harbored an outright dislike of Jews, including William Phillips, Undersecretary of State, the second-highest-ranking man in the department. Dodd met with members of the Jewish-American community, including Stephen S. Wise and Felix Warburg, who asked him to seek a reversal of the Nazis' repressive anti-Jewish policies. Dodd promised he would "exert all possible personal influence against unjust treatment" of German Jews, but not in his official capacity.

President Roosevelt advised him on June 16, 1933:

The German authorities are treating Jews shamefully and the Jews in this country are greatly excited. But this is also not a government affair. We can do nothing except for American citizens who happen to be made victims. We must protect them, and whatever we can do to moderate the general persecution by unofficial and personal influence ought to be done.

Edward M. House, a veteran in Democratic Party circles since the Wilson administration, told Dodd that he should do what he could "to ameliorate Jewish sufferings", but cautioned that "the Jews should not be allowed to dominate economic or intellectual life in Berlin as they have done for a long time." Dodd shared House's views, and wrote in his diary that "The Jews had held a great many more of the key positions in Germany than their numbers or talents entitled them to." Based on this view of the proper role of Jews in society, he advised Hitler in March 1934 that Jewish influence should be restrained in Germany as it was in the United States. "I explained to him [Hitler]", wrote Dodd, "that where a question of over-activity of Jews in university or official life made trouble, we had managed to redistribute the offices in such a way as to not give great offense." Hitler ignored Dodd's advice and responded that "if they [the Jews] continue their activity we shall make a complete end of them in this country."

Dodd tried without success to save the life of Helmut Hirsch, a German-American Jew who planned to bomb parts of the Nazi party rally grounds at Nuremberg.

=== Anti-Americanism ===
The German government's treatment of United States citizens created a series of crises during Dodd's tenure as ambassador. Edgar Ansel Mowrer, a reporter for the Chicago Daily News and president of the Foreign Press Association in Berlin, published a book-length attack on the Nazis, Germany Puts the Clock Back, and continued his critical coverage until the government demanded his resignation as head of the Association. The U.S. State Department ignored the government's demand that it arrange for his return to the U.S. When Mowrer's employers arranged for him to leave and he sought to stay to cover the September 1933 Nuremberg rally, Dodd refused to support him, believing his reporting was so provocative that it made it difficult for other American journalists to work.

=== Assessment of Nazi intentions ===
On October 5, 1933, Dodd gave a speech in Berlin at the American Club describing the New Deal's effect on the U.S. Constitutional system: "It was not revolution as men are prone to say. It was a popular expansion of governmental powers beyond all constitutional grants, and nearly all men everywhere hope the President may succeed."

On October 12, 1933, Dodd gave a speech to the American Chamber of Commerce in Berlin, with Joseph Goebbels and Alfred Rosenberg in attendance, and used an elaborate analogy based on Roman history to criticize the Nazis as "half-educated statesmen" who adopted the "arbitrary modes" of an ancient tyrant. His views grew more critical and pessimistic with the Night of the Long Knives in June–July 1934, when the Nazis killed prominent political opponents including many dissenters within the Nazi movement. Dodd was one of the very few in the U.S. and European diplomatic community who reported that the Nazis were too strongly entrenched for any opposition to emerge. In May 1935 he reported to his State Department superiors that Hitler intended "to annex part of the Corridor, part of Czechoslovakia, and all of Austria". A few months later he predicted a German-Italian alliance. Feeling ineffectual, Dodd offered to resign, but Roosevelt allowed him only a recuperative visit to the U.S. The President wrote to U.S. Ambassador to Italy Breckinridge Long in September 1935 that he and Dodd had been "far more accurate in your pessimism for the past two years than any of my other friends in Europe". In a note to Assistant Secretary of State R. Walton Moore that same month, he wrote of Dodd: "we most certainly do not want him to consider resigning. I need him in Berlin." Dodd reported to Secretary of State Hull in September 1936 that Hitler's domestic economic policies, rearmament, and Rhineland initiatives had consolidated his support to the point that he could count on the support of the German people for a declaration of war "in any measure he might undertake".

Following a U.S. vacation of several months in 1936, Dodd devoted the fall to testing German reaction to a personal meeting between Roosevelt and Hitler, an initiative the President proposed, or a world peace conference. After a series of rebuffs, Dodd produced a report for the State Department dated November 28, 1936, which Assistant Secretary Moore commended and forwarded to Roosevelt. He decried the tendency of Europeans to refuse to believe that Hitler meant to carry out the expansionist plans he had outlined in Mein Kampf. He described Hitler's success in outmaneuvering France and Great Britain diplomatically and forging ties with Italy and Spain. Assessing the current situation, he wrote: "there does not appear to be any vital force or combination of forces which will materially impede Germany in pursuit of her ambitions."

=== Conflict with State Department ===
Many in the State Department had reservations about Dodd's suitability for the job. He was neither a political figure of the sort normally honored with such a prestigious appointment, nor a member of the social elite that formed the higher ranks of the Foreign Service. In Berlin some of his subordinates were embarrassed by his insistence on living modestly, walking unaccompanied in the street, and leaving formal receptions so early as to appear rude. Dodd considered his insistence on living on his $17,500 annual salary a point of pride and criticized the posh lifestyle of other embassy officials.

Early in his tenure as ambassador, Dodd decided to avoid attending the annual Nazi Party rally in Nuremberg rather than appear to endorse Hitler's regime. In 1933, the State Department left the decision to him, and other ambassadors—including those of France and Great Britain—adopted a similar policy to Dodd's. As the Nazi Party became indistinguishable from the government, however, the State Department preferred that Dodd attend and avoid giving offense to the German government. State Department pressure increased each year until Dodd determined to avoid attending in 1937 by arranging a visit to the United States at the time of the rally. His advice against sending a representative of the U.S. embassy to attend the September 1937 Nazi Party congress in Nuremberg was overridden by his State Department superiors, and the State Department allowed its overruling of Dodd's position to become public. Hitler expressed his pleasure with the attendance of the U.S., Great Britain, and France for the first time, recognizing it as an "innovation" in policy.

== Later life ==
In 1937, Dodd stepped down as ambassador in Berlin, and President Roosevelt appointed Hugh Wilson, a senior professional diplomat, to replace him. After leaving his State Department post, Dodd took a position at American University in Washington, D.C.; in addition he campaigned to warn against the dangers posed by Germany, Italy, and Japan, detailing the racial and religious persecution in Germany. He predicted German aggression against Austria, Czechoslovakia, and Poland. Dodd, who suffered for years from a severe throat condition exacerbated by the stress of his ambassadorship, traveled on a speaking tour of Canada and the US, establishing his reputation as a statesman who opposed the Nazis.

In 1938, Dodd wrote an assessment of Nazi ideology and the Third Reich's plan for Europe. He stated:

[S]everal policies were adopted during the first two years of the Nazi regime. The first was to suppress the Jews ... They were to hold no positions in University or government operations, own no land, write nothing for newspapers, gradually give up their personal business relations, be imprisoned and many of them killed ... [The Primer] betrays no indication of the propaganda activities of the Nazi government. And of course there is not a word in it to warn the unwary reader that all the people who might oppose the regime have been absolutely silenced. The central idea behind it is to make the rising generation worship their chief and get ready to "save civilization" from the Jews, from Communism and from democracy—thus preparing the way for a Nazified world where all freedom of the individual, of education, and of the churches is to be totally suppressed.

A volume of his planned four-volume history of the South was published in 1938 as The Old South: Struggles for Democracy, covering the 17th century.

Dodd's wife died in May 1938.

In December 1938, Dodd accidentally ran over a four-year-old African-American child in Hanover County, Virginia, and fled the scene. The child sustained severe injuries, but survived. Dodd paid more than $1000 for the child's medical bills. Dodd was charged with leaving the scene of an accident, convicted, and fined $250 plus court costs. The child's parents sued Dodd and were awarded $3,500. He also lost his voting rights, which were later restored by Virginia's governor.

== Death and legacy ==
After a year's illness, Dodd died of pneumonia on February 9, 1940, at his country home at Round Hill, Loudoun County, Virginia. He was buried beside his wife at that historic farm they called "Stoneleigh", but in 1946 his children reburied their parents at historic Rock Creek Cemetery in Washington, D.C. Stoneleigh subsequently passed through several owners; some historic buildings remain since it became a golf club in 1992. In 1941, his children published the diary Dodd kept during 1933–1938, and the 1916–1920 years were later published as well. Dodd's papers are held in several places, including the Library of Congress, the Southern Historical Collection of the University of North Carolina, Chapel Hill, the libraries of Randolph-Macon College, Duke University, and the University of Chicago, as well as among other people's papers held by the Library of Virginia and Virginia Historical Society.

During World War II the Liberty ship SS William E. Dodd was built in Panama City, Florida, and named in his honor.

In April 1946, during the Nuremberg trials, Dodd's diaries were used as evidence against Hjalmar Schacht, a liberal economist and banker, and a Nazi government official until the end of 1937. Schacht praised Dodd's character but suggested his views in the 1930s were tainted by his less than fluent German. He testified that Dodd was his friend who invited him to emigrate to the United States. Schacht's attorney described Dodd as "one of the few accredited diplomats in Berlin who very obviously had no sympathy of any sort for the regime in power".

== Assessments ==
Assessments of Dodd's service in Berlin vary considerably, colored by what another ambassador might have accomplished. Hull in his Memoirs described Dodd as "sincere though impulsive and inexperienced".

Max Lerner later commented:

If the record of our times were not so keyed to the tragic, it might be read as first-rate ironic comedy. Here was a Germany in which there had just come to dominance a power-drunk fanatic, a ruthless activist who knew little of history and hated democracy; and the man we sent to him to represent American interests was a retiring scholar ... who, in the character of his democracy, was perhaps the last pure Jeffersonian to be found in America.

Dodd felt himself a failure both during his ambassadorship and after, having set himself the impossible standard of "changing the Third Reich by example and persuasion." Historian Gerhard Weinberg believes no other ambassador to Nazi Germany was more effective, "even if some were more popular and others better informed." He reports the assessment of George S. Messersmith, the embassy's consul general who worked closely with Dodd, who wrote that "there were very few men who realized what was happening in Germany more thoroughly" than Dodd, who proved ineffective because he "was completely appalled by what was happening". Historian Franklin L. Ford faults Dodd for failing to provide "concrete intelligence concerning immediate Nazi objectives and power" as his peers were providing their superiors in London and Paris. He faults as well Dodd's nostalgic view of the Germany of his student years and of centuries past, which led Dodd to view German anti-Semitism as a Nazi phenomenon driven personally by Hitler without recognizing its deeper roots in German society.

Dodd and his family's time in Nazi Germany are the subject of Erik Larson's bestselling 2011 work of popular history, In the Garden of Beasts, which portrays Dodd as well-meaning but naive and unprepared, believing as a historian that all national leaders are ultimately rational actors, and rendered helpless when he realizes that Hitler may in fact be completely irrational.

== Selected works ==
- Dodd, William Edward (1899). Thomas Jeffersons Rückkehr zur Politik 1796 (Thomas Jefferson's Return to Politics, 1796) (in German). Leipzig: Grübel & Sommerlatte. OCLC 573540.
- —— (1903). The Life of Nathaniel Macon. New York: Edwards & Broughton, Raleigh, North Carolina.
- —— (1907). Jefferson Davis. Philadelphia: G.W. Jacobs. OCLC 3508109.
- —— (1911). Statesmen of the Old South, or, From Radicalism to Conservative Revolt. New York: Macmillan Co. OCLC 865774.
- —— (1915). Expansion and Conflict. The Riverside History of the United States, vol. III. Boston: Houghton Mifflin. OCLC 18552467.
- —— (1919). The Cotton Kingdom: A Chronicle of the Old South. New Haven: Yale University Press. OCLC 478328.
- —— (1920). Woodrow Wilson and His Work. Garden City, New York: Doubleday, Page. OCLC 1809908.
- Wilson, Woodrow (1925–27). Ray Stannard Baker; —— (eds.). The Public Papers of Woodrow Wilson. New York: Harper Brothers. 6 vols
- —— (1928). Lincoln or Lee: Comparison and Contrast of the Two Greatest Leaders in the War Between the States: The Narrow and Accidental Margins of Success. New York: Macmillan. OCLC 1185879.
- —— (1937). The Old South: Struggles for Democracy. New York: Macmillan.
- Lamprecht, Karl (1905). What is History? Five Lectures on the Modern Science of History. Translated by E. A. Andrews; ——. New York: Macmillan. OCLC 1169422.

Diplomatic posts
Preceded by Frederic M. Sackett	United States Ambassador to Germany; August 30, 1933 – December 29, 1937	Succeeded by Hugh R. Wilson
