= SS William E. Dodd =

World War II Liberty ship of the United States

History

United States
- Name: William E. Dodd
- Namesake: William E. Dodd
- Owner: War Shipping Administration (WSA)
- Operator: Marine Transport Lines Inc.
- Ordered: as type (EC2-S-C1) hull, MC hull 2308
- Builder: J.A. Jones Construction, Panama City, Florida
- Cost: $964,519,
- Yard number: 49
- Way number: 3
- Laid down: 19 May 1944
- Launched: 22 June 1944
- Sponsored by: Miss Frances Spain
- Completed: 15 July 1944
- Identification: Call Signal: WREQ
- Fate: Laid up in National Defense Reserve Fleet, Mobile, Alabama, 12 September 1945; Sold for commercial use, 25 July 1947

Norway
- Name: Milbank
- Owner: Skibs-A/S Skytteren
- Operator: Yngvar Hvistendahl, Tonsberg, Norway
- Acquired: 25 July 1947
- Fate: Sold, 1958

Liberia
- Name: Thanksgiving
- Owner: Seabird Steamship Co.
- Operator: C. M. Los, Ltd., London
- Acquired: 1958
- Fate: Scrapped, 1967

General characteristics
- Class & type: Liberty ship; type EC2-S-C1, standard
- Tonnage: 10,865 LT DWT; 7,176 GRT
- Displacement: 3,380 long tons (3,434 t) (light); 14,245 long tons (14,474 t) (max)
- Length: 441 feet 6 inches (135 m) oa; 416 feet (127 m) pp; 427 feet (130 m) lwl
- Beam: 57 feet (17 m)
- Draft: 27 ft 9.25 in (8.4646 m)
- Installed power: 2 × Oil fired 450 °F (232 °C) boilers, operating at 220 psi (1,500 kPa); 2,500 hp (1,900 kW)
- Propulsion: 1 × triple-expansion steam engine, (manufactured by General Machinery Corp., Hamilton, Ohio); 1 × screw propeller
- Speed: 11.5 knots (21.3 km/h; 13.2 mph)
- Capacity: 562,608 cubic feet (15,931 m^{3}) (grain); 499,573 cubic feet (14,146 m^{3}) (bale)
- Complement: 38–62 USMM; 21–40 USNAG
- Armament: Varied by ship; Bow-mounted 3-inch (76 mm)/50-caliber gun; Stern-mounted 4-inch (102 mm)/50-caliber gun; 2–8 × single 20-millimeter (0.79 in) Oerlikon anti-aircraft (AA) cannons and/or, 2–8 × 37-millimeter (1.46 in) M1 AA guns

SS William E. Dodd was a Liberty ship built in the United States during World War II. She was named after William E. Dodd, the United States Ambassador to Germany from 1933 to 1937.

== Construction ==
William E. Dodd was laid down on 19 May 1944, under a Maritime Commission (MARCOM) contract, MC hull 2308, by J.A. Jones Construction, Panama City, Florida; she was sponsored by Miss Frances Spain, and launched on 22 June 1944.

== History ==
She was allocated to Marine Transport Lines, Inc., on 15 July 1944. On 15 May 1945, she damaged the No. 5 bearing of her main engine. Sea trials were conducted on 27 May 1945, after repairing the bearing but they were unsuccessful so now the entire crankshaft was replaced. Sea trials were again conducted on 22 June 1945, but were again unsuccessful, this time the No. 6 bearing went out and needed repairing. She was able to return to the US on 24 July 1945. On 12 September 1945, she was laid up in the National Defense Reserve Fleet, in the James River Group, Lee Hall, Virginia. On 25 July 1947, she was sold to Norway, for commercial use. She was renamed Milbank and sailed under a Norwegian flag until 1958, when she was sold to Seabird Steamship Co., and reflagged for Liberia, and renamed Thanksgiving. She was scrapped in Hirao, in 1967.

== Bibliography ==
- "Jones Construction, Panama City FL". www.ShipbuildingHistory.com. 13 October 2010.
- "Liberty Ships – World War II".
- Maritime Administration. "William E. Dodd". Ship History Database Vessel Status Card. U.S. Department of Transportation, Maritime Administration. Archived from the original on 12 December 2019.
- Davies, James (May 2004). "Specifications (As-Built)" (PDF). p. 23.
- "SS William E. Dodd".
