= William Schauffler Dodd =

American Christian medical missionary (1860–1928)

William Schauffler Dodd (December 27, 1860 - January 27, 1928) was an American Christian medical missionary and physician who predominantly worked in Asia Minor, particularly in Turkey. Dodd is best known for his efforts to establish a medical institution and promote nursing education in Turkey. He worked all over Turkey, but mainly in Cesarea (modern-day Kayseri). Dodd began his missionary work in 1886 and worked as a doctor and surgeon. His primary goal was to build a hospital in Cesarea, which he succeeded. Dodd founded the first hospital ever in this region. Dodd also worked to establish a nursing school and advocated for the training of female nurses. In 1924, Dodd terminated his missionary work and returned back to the United States. His work had a lasting impact on the development of healthcare and nursing in Turkey.

== Early life ==
=== Missionary Parents ===
William S. Dodd was born on December 27, 1860 in Smyrna, Turkey to American parents Edward Mills Dodd and Lydia Harris Babbitt. Dodd's parents served as missionaries to Turkey (1849-1865) establishing a school for girls. His father graduated from Princeton University in 1846 and the Union Theological Seminary in 1848. After completing his education, Edward Dodd embarked on a mission trip overseas in Turkey where William was born. William had four siblings: Hettie M. Carter, Frederic Dodd (who died in infancy), Louisa Jeanette Dodd, and Isabel Frances Dodd. His father wrote the missionary pamphlet "Why Medical Missions". In 1865, his father died while working in Turkey due to cholera, prompting his mother to move his family home to the United States.

=== Education ===
After returning to New Jersey, William Dodd completed his education at Princeton University, graduating in 1881. Dodd pursued medical studies in New York from 1881-1886, while also attending the Union Theological Seminary, where he graduated in 1884. On June 24, 1886, William married Mary Louisa Dodd, where they went on to have six children. Following their marriage, Dodd and his wife traveled to Asia Minor, modern day Turkey, where Dodd began his medical missionary work.

=== Family ===
Dodd married Mary Carter. Their children were:

- Wilson F. Dodd (1893-1958) who studied at Princeton and later Cornell Medical School. Wilson Dodd served as a medical missionary for Near East Relief in Beirut, Syria.
- Alexander ("Aleck") Dixon Dodd (1891-1985)
- Nellie Carter Dodd (1890-1964)
- Edward M Dodd (1887-1967) who served as a medical missionary from 1916-1921 in Tabriz, Persia (now Iran). He was educated at Princeton University(1909) and studied medicine at Cornell Medical School(1913).
- T. Carter Dodd
- Stuart C. Dodd (1900-1975), an American Sociologist and namesake of the Stuart C. Dodd Institute. Stuart Dodd was educated at Princeton University (1926).

== Missionary work ==
=== Calling and Journey ===
In 1886, Dodd and his wife traveled to Turkey to begin his missionary work under the American Board of Commissioners for Foreign Missions. During the first five weeks of his mission, Dodd traveled throughout the Yozgat region, visiting 13 villages. During the days, he traveled and provided medical care to patients, and in the evenings Dodd held meetings to engage in religious work and ministry. Following this early period, Dodd and his wife proceeded to Cesarea, Turkey. At the time, Cesarea had a population of around 3 million people, but lacked any hospitals or medical dispensaries in the whole city.

=== The Cesarea Dispensary and Hospital ===
Dodd’s primary goal was to establish a hospital in the Cesarea region to address the healthcare needs. His initial attempts to gain approval from the Turkish government to build a hospital were unsuccessful. Despite this, a local governor in Cesarea granted Dodd permission to build a house, which he essentially used as a medical dispensary starting in 1890 at Talas. With the help of $5,000 in fundraising from his father in law, Dodd was able to create the dispensary.

In 1900, Dodd established the Cesarea dispensary, which he later developed into a full hospital called the American Christian Hospital. The dispensary was staffed by fellow medical missionaries and Armenian pharmacists. Dodd continued to expand the facility and by 1908, the hospital contained waiting rooms, two examination rooms, and a drug store.

Under Dodd, the American Christian Hospital treated thousands of patients and performed numerous surgeries. In his final year of service, Dodd treated 7,803 patients with approximately three-quarters of them receiving care free of charge. The hospital provided shelter to 114 of the patients who underwent surgery. The total number of inpatient patient days was 7,175. On average, patients stayed in the hospital for 18.5 days.

After the hospital was created, World War I began. Dodd and the hospital played a key role in helping save Armenians from deportation and providing relief work to those affected by the war. Dodd and his wife continued their mission in Turkey until 1924, when they returned back to New Jersey.

=== Nursing ===
Dodd played a significant role in the development of the nursing profession in Turkey. Before Dodd, nursing was not initially viewed as a respected or established profession. In the early years of the hospital, Dodd introduced nursing into the hospital by hiring one female and two male nurses. Over time, more nurses were trained and integrated into the hospital, allowing the concept of nursing to gain popularity and become respected. Dodd’s work helped break social barriers, making it acceptable for women to become nurses and for unmarried women to care for male patients. The success of female nurses in his hospital marked a turning point in the profession in Turkey.

Dodd, with several colleagues, contributed to formalized nursing education. They created a textbook on nursing and established a training school for nurses. The curriculum at the school included extensive practical training, bedside instruction, lectures on anatomy and physiology, and lessons based on their textbook. The ultimate goal of the program was to train “nurse-bible women.” These are women who are equipped with nursing skills and knowledge of the Bible. After completing their training, these women could minister others in their community by providing healthcare and spreading Christianity.

=== Evangelism ===
In addition to his medical work, a large portion of Dodd’s mission was evangelist work. On his journey, he was accompanied by his pastor. Along with the help of his wife, the Dodds and the pastor all sought to spread Christianity among the local population. Mrs. Dodd played a central role in the religious work, often engaging directly with the patients her husband treated. Despite the fact that this was a Christian hospital, Dodd made it accessible and appealing to all types of people, especially Armenians and Muslims. The hospital was created to welcome all individuals, regardless of their races or religions.

=== Later life ===
Upon his return to the US in 1924, Dodd became medical and service secretary to Near East Relief with the responsibility of maintaining all medical policies for Near East Relief. He was succeeded by Dr. Wilfred Post in 1928.

== Legacy ==
Over 38 years of service, Dodd left a lasting mark on the Cesarea community in Turkey and nursing in general. Dodd's hospital treated thousands of patients and provided accessible medical care to people of all religions and races, something that was not common at the time. His religious indifference helped build trust amongst a variety of different groups and expanded the opportunity to spread his evangelism. Dodd was able to make his hospital a center of healing, physically and spiritually. The hospital promoted the integration of medical care with Christian evangelism in a way that appealed to a diverse population.

The Talas American Hospital, which Dodd ran until 1911, closed in 1972 with the buildings being incorporated into the Erciyes University.

Dodd’s missionary work left a significant impact on the development of nursing. Dodd played a key role in professionalizing nursing and making it into a respectable career. His creation of a training school for nurses and a nursing textbook shaped the future of nursing in the region. Additionally, Dodd paved the way for women to enter the healthcare field with respect.
