= David Jones (footballer, born 1935) =

English footballer (1935–2014)

Personal information
- Date of birth: 3 March 1935
- Place of birth: Orpington, Kent
- Date of death: 3 July 2014 (aged 79)
- Place of death: Swansea, Wales
- Position: Goalkeeper

Senior career*
Years	Team	Apps	(Gls)
1955–1958	Swansea Town	3	(0)
1958–1967	Yeovil Town		
- * Club domestic league appearances and goals

David Jones, also known as Dai (3 March 1935 – 3 July 2014) was an English professional footballer who played as a goalkeeper.

== Career ==
Jones was born in Orpington and was in the Army before signing for Swansea Town in 1955. He made three appearances for the club in the Football League, as well as two cup appearances. He then played for Yeovil Town, making 363 appearances for them between 1958 and 1967. While with Yeovil he won the Southern League Cup and Southern League Premier Division, and at the time of the death he was ranked twelfth in Yeovil Town's all-time appearance list.

== Later life ==
Jones retired due to injury in 1967, becoming the coach of the Yeovil Town youth team. He later worked as a sales rep and ran his own shop. At the time of his death he had two daughters, six grandchildren and five great grandchildren.
