= Roger Wosahlo =

English footballer

Personal information
- Full name: Roger Frank Wosahlo
- Date of birth: 11 September 1947
- Place of birth: Cambridge, England
- Date of death: 10 January 2015 (aged 67)
- Place of death: Ipswich, England
- Position: Winger

Youth career
- Chelsea

Senior career*
Years	Team	Apps	(Gls)
1966–1967	Chelsea	1	(0)
1967–1968	Ipswich Town	1	(0)
1968–1969	Peterborough United	15	(1)
1969–1970	Ipswich Town	1	(0)
1970–1973	Rangers		
- * Club domestic league appearances and goals

Roger Frank Wosahlo (11 September 1947 – 10 January 2015) was an English professional footballer.

== Career ==
Born in Cambridge, Wosahlo was an England schoolboys international. He joined the Chelsea youth system, and went on to become top scorer in their youth team. He made his first-team debut during the 1966–67 season as a substitute against Stoke City on 22 April 1967, but did not make any further appearances, and joined Ipswich Town in July 1967.

He became a regular reserve team player, but made only one first team appearance during the 1967–68 season in a 4–1 win at Huddersfield Town on 16 September 1967, setting up two of Ipswich's four goals. He joined Peterborough United at the end of the season. After making 15 league appearances for Peterborough in 1968–69, he returned to Ipswich. However, he was unable to become a first team regular, making only a single appearance during the 1969–70 season in a 2–2 draw with Liverpool on 18 October 1969. He subsequently moved to South Africa to play for the Johannesburg-based Rangers, where he played for three seasons.

Wosahlo later returned to the Ipswich area, settling in Belstead. He became player-manager at Suffolk & Ipswich League club Waterside, and went on to become involved with Ipswich Wanderers for over two decades, including holding the position of Development Manager. He died on 10 January 2015 at the age of 67 due to cancer.
