= William E. Dodd Jr. =

American politician

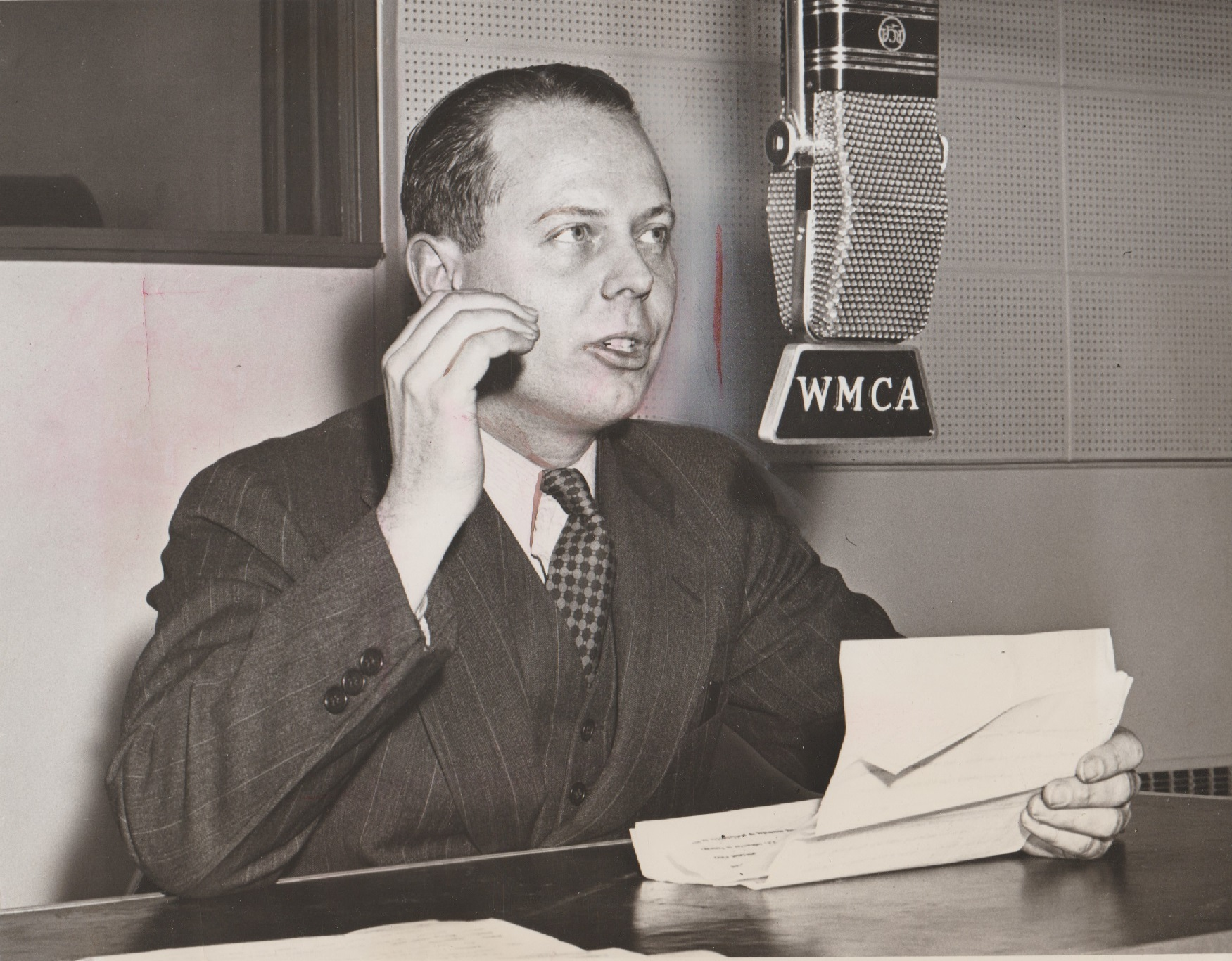
Dodd speaks on the radio during a debate on whether the United States should enter World War II, February 1941

William Edward Dodd Jr. (August 8, 1905 – October 18, 1952) was an American political activist who ran unsuccessfully for Congress during the 1930s. While working for the Federal Communications Commission in the administration of Franklin D. Roosevelt during the 1940s, he became the target of an early congressional crusade against alleged communist sympathizers and subversives. A 1943 amendment to an emergency war appropriations bill deprived Dodd and two other federal officials of their salary and positions. Three years later, the United States Supreme Court declared the law's provision to be an unconstitutional bill of attainder.

Dodd was the son of William E. Dodd, who served as United States Ambassador to Germany between 1933 and 1938, and the brother of Martha Dodd, who had affairs with Nazis and a Soviet NKVD agent before becoming an accused secret agent of the Soviet Union.

== Personal background ==
Dodd was born in Ashland, Virginia, to Randolph-Macon College history professor William E. Dodd and Martha Ida "Mat" Johns Dodd. Three years later, his father joined the faculty at the University of Chicago, while retaining his farm in Loudoun County, Virginia. William Jr. received his bachelor's degree from the University of Chicago, and his master's degree from Harvard University. He then taught history in Washington D.C., Rutgers, The College of William and Mary, and the University of California. He married and had two sons. He and his sister had a close relationship with Daniel C. Roper, President Roosevelt's first Secretary of Commerce. Through William Jr. and Roper, William Sr. passed on to President Roosevelt his interest in receiving an ambassadorship.

== Berlin activities ==
In 1933, at Roper's suggestion, Roosevelt asked William Sr. to become the United States' Ambassador to Berlin. He accepted, and was quickly confirmed. The entire Dodd family, including William Jr. and his sister, relocated to Berlin. In 1935, William Jr. completed his Ph.D. in History at the University of Berlin. During his father's tenure as ambassador, William Jr. and his father met with President Roosevelt in Hyde Park, New York.

Returning from Berlin, William Jr. initially returned to teaching. However, he was drawn to political activism. In 1936, he testified in London in favor of protecting Spain's republican government against attacks from fascist-backed rebels, and in 1937 raised money on behalf of homeless Spanish children of the Basque region. He served as chairman of the Japanese Boycott Committee, the American League Against War and Fascism, and the American Committee for Anti-Nazi Literature.

== Candidacy for the U.S. House ==
In 1938, at age 32, Dodd sought the Democratic nomination for Virginia's 8th congressional district, which was directly across the Potomac River from Washington. The seat was held by four-term incumbent Howard W. Smith, a conservative Democrat on the United States House Committee on Rules who used his position to obstruct parts of the Roosevelt Administration's New Deal agenda. Smith was also a powerful lieutenant in the Byrd Organization, led by U.S. Senator Harry F. Byrd, who questioned many aspects of the New Deal, from its fiscal policies to support for racial integration. Dodd ran as an ardent supporter of the New Deal, with the support of Secretary of the Interior Harold Ickes and others in the President's circle. Dodd was not known to many voters, had little campaign organization in the district, and little political experience. Like several other New Dealers seeking to unseat "disloyal" incumbent Democrats in 1938 primaries, Dodd lost badly. Smith outpolled Dodd by a 3 to 1 margin.

After his defeat, Dodd returned to his father's farm in then rural Loudoun County, Virginia and worked on a book on his father's experiences in Germany. He was later appointed to a position in the Works Progress Administration.

In 1939, he became engaged to fellow anti-fascist Susan B. Anthony II, grandniece of famed suffragist Susan B. Anthony. Only four days after that announcement, however, the engagement was broken. The following year William wed another social activist, Audrey Koolish of Chicago. They had two sons, Thomas Allen Dodd (born in September 1941), and Peter Johns Dodd. After his marriage to Audrey ended in divorce, Dodd married Kathryn Hubbard.

After Ambassador Dodd died in early 1940, William Jr. established the William E. Dodd Foundation. It was intended to advance his father's Jeffersonian ideals, but it soon came under fire for financing U.S. Week, a periodical written and edited by leftists. In 1941, Dodd and his sister co-edited "Ambassador Dodd's Diary: 1933-1938," based on the diaries their father kept during his tenure in Berlin.

== Federal Communications Commission ==
In 1942, Dodd became an assistant editor with the Foreign Broadcast Monitoring Service, a branch of the Federal Communications Commission. His responsibilities included reading transcripts of foreign broadcasts to pick out items that would be of interest to various government departments.

== Martin Dies' attack, and bill of attainder ==
On February 1, 1943, Congressman Martin Dies, then chair of the House Committee on Un-American Activities, made a speech on the floor of the House that "attacked thirty-nine named government employees as 'irresponsible, unrepresentative, crackpot, radical bureaucrats,' and affiliates of 'Communist front organizations,'" and urged that Congress refuse to appropriate money for their salaries. Dodd was one of those named by Dies. Four days later, an amendment was offered to an appropriations measure providing that "no part of any appropriation contained in this act shall be used to pay the compensation of" any of the thirty-nine individuals that Dies had attacked. The House ultimately voted in favor of a narrower measure setting up a special subcommittee to examine Rep. Dies' allegations. Taking testimony in secret, the subcommittee declared that Dodd and two other officials – Robert Morss Lovett and Goodwin B. Watson – were guilty of having engaged in "subversive activity within the definition adopted by the committee," and were therefore "unfit for the present to continue in Government employment." After several days of debate, the House passed an amendment to the Urgent Deficiency Appropriation Act of 1943 providing that, after November 15, 1943, no salary or compensation should be paid to Dodd, Watson or Lovett "out of any monies then or thereafter appropriated except for services as jurors or members of the armed forces, unless they were, prior to November 15, 1943, again appointed to jobs by the President with the advice and consent of the Senate.". The Senate unanimously voted to remove this amendment, but the House refused to pass the urgent appropriations measure without it, and ultimately the Senate relented. President Roosevelt signed the bill while objecting to the provision directed at the three officials, stating that "the Senate yielded, as I have been forced to yield, to avoid delaying our conduct of the war. But I cannot so yield without placing on record my view that this provision is not only unwise and discriminatory, but unconstitutional."

As the Supreme Court would later state in its ruling in United States v. Lovett, 328 U.S. 303 (1946), "Notwithstanding the congressional enactment, and the failure of the President to reappoint respondents, the agencies kept all the respondents at work on their jobs for varying periods after November 15, 1943; but their compensation was discontinued after that date." Dodd became assistant editor of The Dispatcher (a journal of the International Longshoremen's and Warehousemen's Union. The three officials sued in the U.S. Court of Claims, and prevailed, obtaining an order the United States compensate them. On June 3, 1946, the U.S. Supreme Court affirmed that judgment. Writing for the court, Justice Hugo Black viewed the amendment as more than an appropriations measure, but as one that prohibited the officials from ever holding a government job. The court held that the amendment was unconstitutional as a bill of attainder, because it took away the life, liberty or property of particularly named persons because Congress thought them guilty of conduct which deserved punishment.

The district court's order did not require the officials' reinstatement, and Dodd's lost back pay totaled very little. In 1947, the House included payment of the judgments in favor of the three officials in a new appropriations bill.

== Death ==
Dodd ultimately moved to San Francisco in 1950, where he worked as a clerk at Macy's Department Store. He also was a manager of a Walden's Bookstore. He was with the University of California, Berkeley but lost his job because he refused to take the loyalty oath. Dodd died of cancer in San Francisco on October 18, 1952. He was 47.
