= Bill Dodd (footballer) =

English footballer

Personal information
- Full name: William Dodd
- Date of birth: 30 September 1936
- Place of birth: Bedlington, England
- Date of death: 14 January 2015 (aged 78)
- Place of death: Reedley Hallows, England
- Position: Forward

Senior career*
Years	Team	Apps	(Gls)
–1956	Whitley Bay		
1956–1958	Burnley	0	(0)
1958–1959	Workington	1	(1)
1958	Halifax Town		
1958	Rossendale United	6	(5)
Total		1	(1)
- * Club domestic league appearances and goals

William Dodd (30 September 1936 – 14 January 2015) was an English professional footballer who played as a forward in the Football League for Burnley and Workington and in non-League football for Halifax Town and Rossendale United.

== Career ==
Born in Bedlington, Northumberland, Dodd started his career with Whitley Bay in the North Eastern League when he was spotted by scouts from Football League First Division side Burnley. He signed for the Clarets in January 1956 and made his first appearance representing the 'A' side. In the 1956–57 season he was the top goalscorer for the 'A' side with 19 goals in the Lancashire Football League. During his two seasons with the club he also featured in a number of reserve games, scoring two hat-tricks in The Central League. One of these was against fierce local rivals Blackburn Rovers in February 1958. He left Turf Moor in 1958 and signed for Football League Fourth Division side Workington, where he went on to make his only league appearance, scoring in the process. He later had trials with Halifax Town and Rossendale United of the Lancashire Combination.

== Personal life ==
Dodd died on 14 January 2015 in Reedley Hallows, Lancashire, at the age of 78, survived by his wife Irene, son Kevin and daughter Sara.
