= Alessandro Della Valle =

Sammarinese footballer

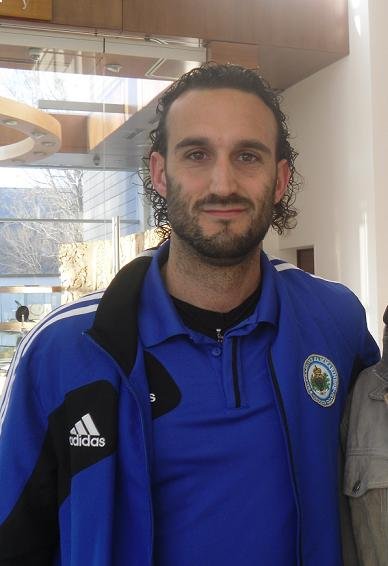

Personal information
- Full name: Alessandro Della Valle
- Date of birth: 8 June 1982 (age 44)
- Place of birth: Borgo Maggiore, San Marino
- Height: 1.86 m (6 ft 1 in)
- Position: Centre-back

Senior career*
Years	Team	Apps	(Gls)
2000–2002	San Marino Calcio		
2002–2003	SS Folgore/Falciano		
2003–2006	Tropical Coriano		
2006	Marignano Calcio		
2007–2008	USD Scot Due Emme		
2008–2009	PD Fontanelle		
2009–2010	Tropical Coriano		
2010–2011	ACD Sanvitese		
2011–2016	Sant'Ermete Sanvitese		
2016–2018	A.C. Juvenes/Dogana	33	(0)

International career
2002–2017	San Marino	65	(1)

Managerial career
- 2020–: S.S. Pennarossa (assistant manager)
- * Club domestic league appearances and goals

Alessandro Della Valle (born 8 June 1982) is a former Sammarinese footballer who last played with A.C. Juvenes/Dogana and formerly the San Marino national football team. He scored San Marino's first competitive goal in 5 years against Poland in the 2014 FIFA World Cup qualification on 10 September 2013.

== Football career ==
Della Valle started his career in 2000 at San Marino Calcio in the Italian leagues. In 2002, he moved to SS Folgore/Falciano in the Sammarinese Football Championship before moving to Italian club Tropical Coriano. Until 2012, he played for Marignano Calcio, USD Scot Due Emme, FV Fontanelle, returned to Tropical Coriano and ASD Sanvitese before returning to Folgore/Falciano in 2012. In 2013, following his goal against Poland, the Polish club Polonia Warsaw offered him a one year contract. Initial reports claimed that he had accepted it but this was attributed to misunderstanding due to Della Valle's level of English and he later affirmed that he had not agreed due to the terms not being sufficient to persuade him to give up his non-football career. He then moved to AC Juvenes/Dogana in 2017 and retired from football the same year.

During the FIFA World Cup 2014 qualifying campaign, Della Valle scored San Marino's first competitive goal in five years in their match against the Poland national football team. This brought him to international media attention, despite Polish media erroneously describing him as a banker, and he claimed he was welcomed back to San Marino like a national hero. During UEFA Euro 2016 qualifying, in both of San Marino's matches against the England national football team, Della Valle was noted as having scored two own-goals, one in each match.

== International goals ==
Score and Result lists San Marino's goals first

#	Date	Venue	Opponent	Score	Result	Competition
14.	10 September 2013	Stadio Olimpico, Serravalle	Poland	1–1	1–5	2014 FIFA World Cup qualification

== Personal life ==
Outside of football, Della Valle's full-time job was as a commercial advisor for a commercial tile company, working to focus on the Italian market. He often had to take time off work in order to train and play for San Marino.
