= Montenegro national football team records and statistics =

As a member of FIFA and UEFA, the Montenegro national football team has been playing official matches since March 2007. Montenegro plays in the qualifiers for the FIFA World Cup and UEFA European Championship, as well as partaking in the UEFA Nations League. Apart from that, the team participates in friendly matches.

== Individual records ==
=== Most capped players ===
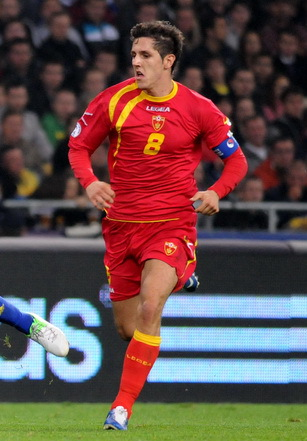
Stevan Jovetić is Montenegro's most capped player and top scorer.

Caps and goals correct as of 15 November 2026.

Rank	Player	Caps	Goals	Career
1	Stevan Jovetić	96	37	2007–present
2	Fatos Bećiraj	86	15	2009–2022
3	Stefan Savić	82	9	2010–present
4	Adam Marušić	70	5	2015–present
5	Stefan Mugoša	65	16	2015–2026
6	Vladimir Jovović	64	0	2013–present
6	Žarko Tomašević	64	5	2010–2023
8	Marko Vešović	63	2	2013–present
8	Marko Janković	63	1	2016–present
10	Elsad Zverotić	61	5	2008–2017

=== Top goalscorers ===
Caps and goals correct as of 15 November 2026.

Rank	Player	Goals	Caps	Average	Career
1	Stevan Jovetić	37	96	0.39	2007–present
2	Mirko Vučinić	17	46	0.37	2007–2017
3	Stefan Mugoša	16	65	0.25	2015–2026
4	Fatos Bećiraj	15	86	0.17	2009–2022
5	Nikola Krstović	13	40	0.29	2022–present
6	Milutin Osmajić	11	42	0.26	2020–present
7	Stefan Savić	9	82	0.11	2010–present
8	Dejan Damjanović	8	30	0.27	2008–2015
9	Radomir Đalović	7	26	0.27	2007–2012
10	Andrija Delibašić	6	21	0.29	2009–2013

=== List of players ===
The following table summarizes caps for the Montenegro national team by every single player, since 2007.

Player	Montenegro career	Caps	C	O	F	G
Fatos Bećiraj	2009–2020	75	11	49	26	10
Elsad Zverotić	2008–2017	61	0	38	23	5
Stevan Jovetić	2007–2020	56	27	41	15	27
Stefan Savić	2010–2020	55	8	40	15	5
Mirko Vučinić	2007–2017	46	38	27	19	17
Simon Vukčević	2007–2014	45	1	26	19	2
Nikola Vukčević	2014–2020	44	4	33	11	1
Marko Simić	2013–2020	44	2	28	16	1
Vladimir Božović	2007–2014	43	0	21	22	0
Mladen Božović	2007–2017	41	0	23	18	0
Marko Baša	2009–2017	39	0	25	14	2
Savo Pavićević	2007–2014	39	0	19	20	0
Vukašin Poleksić	2007–2016	38	4	20	18	0
Žarko Tomašević	2010–2019	37	0	23	14	4
Milan Jovanović	2007–2014	36	1	16	20	0
Stefan Mugoša	2015–2019	35	0	22	13	10
Adam Marušić	2015–2020	35	0	27	8	0
Milorad Peković	2007–2013	34	0	19	15	0
Nikola Drinčić	2007–2014	33	1	20	13	3
Vladimir Jovović	2013–2020	33	0	23	10	0
Branko Bošković	2007–2014	30	9	15	15	1
Dejan Damjanović	2008–2015	30	0	26	4	8
Marko Vešović	2013–2019	30	0	19	11	2
Aleksandar Boljević	2013–2020	29	0	19	10	0
Radomir Đalović	2007–2011	26	1	11	15	7
Miodrag Džudović	2008–2013	26	0	15	11	1
Radoslav Batak	2007–2011	25	0	11	14	1
Mitar Novaković	2007–2013	25	0	12	13	0
Mladen Kašćelan	2009–2016	25	0	13	12	0
Luka Pejović	2007–2012	23	0	7	16	1
Marko Janković	2016–2020	23	0	17	6	2
Danijel Petković	2014–2020	23	1	16	7	0
Nebojša Kosović	2016–2020	22	0	16	6	1
Andrija Delibašić	2009–2013	21	0	12	9	6
Aleksandar Šćekić	2016–2020	20	0	16	4	0
Marko Bakić	2012–2020	18	0	10	8	0
Vladimir Volkov	2012–2015	17	0	13	4	0
Filip Stojković	2016–2019	15	0	10	5	0
Mirko Ivanić	2017–2019	15	0	13	2	1
Saša Balić	2011–2020	13	0	6	7	0
Milan Mijatović	2015–2020	13	0	9	4	0
Jovan Tanasijević	2007–2009	13	0	5	8	0
Sead Hakšabanović	2017–2020	12	0	8	4	1
Luka Đorđević	2012–2018	11	0	6	5	1
Filip Kasalica	2012–2014	11	0	8	3	1
Nemanja Nikolić	2009–2016	10	0	4	6	0
Boris Kopitović	2018–2019	8	0	5	3	1
Damir Kojašević	2016–2019	9	0	6	3	1
Branislav Janković	2014–2020	9	0	3	6	0
Igor Burzanović	2007–2008	8	2	1	7	2'
Momčilo Raspopović	2019–2020	7	0	5	2	0
Emrah Klimenta	2016–2018	7	0	3	4	0
Petar Grbić	2011–2016	7	0	2	5	0
Risto Lakić	2007–2008	7	0	0	7	0
Dragan Bogavac	2007–2008	7	0	1	6	0
Risto Radunović	2018–2020	7	0	6	1	0
Aleksandar Šofranac	2016–2020	7	0	3	4	0
Vlado Jeknić	2007	6	0	0	6	0
Nikola Vujović	2007–2009	6	0	2	4	0
Milan Purović	2007–2008	6	0	0	6	0
Ivan Fatić	2009–2011	6	0	4	2	0
Deni Hočko	2018–2020	6	0	2	4	0
Marko Ćetković	2010–2013	6	0	1	5	1
Nemanja Mijušković	2017–2018	6	0	4	2	0
Dušan Lagator	2019	6	0	4	2	0
Igor Vujačić	2019–2020	6	0	5	1	0
Vladimir Rodić	2015–2016	5	0	2	3	0
Dejan Ognjanović	2008–2010	5	0	0	5	0
Miloš Krkotić	2013	5	0	3	2	0
Dino Islamović	2020	5	0	4	1	0
Ivan Kecojević	2012–2013	5	0	4	1	0
Darko Zorić	2014–2018	4	0	1	3	1
Esteban Saveljich	2015–2016	4	0	2	2	0
Staniša Mandić	2015	4	0	3	1	0
Vukan Savićević	2017–2019	4	0	2	2	0
Janko Tumbasević	2007	4	0	0	4	0
Luka Mirković	2018–2020	4	0	1	3	0
Igor Ivanović	2020	3	0	2	1	3
Darko Bulatović	2019–2020	3	0	1	2	0
Mirko Raičević	2007	3	0	0	3	0
Filip Raičević	2016	3	0	1	2	0
Srđan Radonjić	2007	3	0	0	3	0
Marko Vukčević	2015–2020	3	0	1	2	0
Đorđije Ćetković	2007–2008	3	0	0	3	0
Darko Nikač	2013–2014	3	0	0	3	0
Miroje Jovanović	2013–2014	3	0	0	3	1
Draško Božović	2010	3	0	1	2	0
Vladimir Vujović	2007	3	0	0	3	0
Miloš Raičković	2020	3	0	1	2	0
Nikola Vujnović	2020	2	0	0	2	0
Stefan Lončar	2018	2	0	0	2	0
Asmir Kajević	2018	2	0	0	2	0
Ivan Delić	2007–2010	2	0	0	2	0
Darko Božović	2007	2	0	0	2	0
Srđan Blažić	2009–2010	2	0	0	2	0
Blažo Igumanović	2012–2014	2	0	1	1	0
Janko Simović	2008	1	0	0	1	0
Goran Vujović	2009	1	0	1	0	0
Ivan Ivanović	2013	1	0	0	1	0
Nikola Nikezić	2007	1	0	0	1	0
Dragan Bošković	2012	1	0	0	1	0
Ivan Janjušević	2008	1	0	0	1	0
Slobodan Lakićević	2010	1	0	0	1	0
Ivan Vuković	2009	1	0	0	1	0
Vladimir Gluščević	2009	1	0	0	1	0
Rade Petrović	2007	1	0	0	1	0
Nikola Vukčević	2009	1	0	0	1	0
Neđeljko Vlahović	2007	1	0	0	1	0
Miloš Bakrač	2018	1	0	0	1	0
Nemanja Sekulić	2019	1	0	1	0	0
Vladan Adžić	2020	1	0	0	1	0
Matija Sarkic	2019	1	0	0	1	0
Vasko Kalezić	2020	1	0	0	1	0
Šaleta Kordić	2020	1	0	0	1	0
Miloš Milović	2020	1	0	0	1	0
Anđelko Jovanović	2020	1	0	0	1	0
Milutin Osmajić	2020	1	0	0	1	0

Updated: 16 November 2026

=== List of goalscorers ===
The following table summarizes goals for the Montenegro national team by every single goalscorer.

Player	Goals	O	F	First goal	Last goal
Stevan Jovetić	31	21	10	2008	2021
Mirko Vučinić	17	9	8	2007	2015
Fatos Bećiraj	11	10	1	2010	2021
Stefan Mugoša	11	8	3	2017	2020
Dejan Damjanović	8	7	1	2009	2015
Radomir Đalović	7	1	6	2008	2011
Andrija Delibašić	6	6	0	2009	2012
Elsad Zverotić	5	5	0	2010	2013
Žarko Tomašević	5	4	1	2014	2021
Stefan Savić	5	3	2	2011	2018
Igor Ivanović	3	2	1	2020	2020
Nikola Drinčić	3	1	2	2008	2012
Marko Simić	2	2	0	2017	2021
Aleksandar Boljević	2	2	0	2020	2020
Marko Vešović	2	2	0	2017	2019
Marko Janković	2	2	0	2017	2018
Marko Baša	2	0	2	2010	2013
Igor Burzanović	2	0	2	2007	2008
Simon Vukčević	2	0	2	2008	2011
Boris Kopitović	1	1	0	2018	2018
Darko Zorić	1	1	0	2018	2018
Nikola Vukčević	1	1	0	2016	2016
Radoslav Batak	1	1	0	2009	2009
Branko Bošković	1	0	1	2008	2008
Marko Ćetković	1	0	1	2013	2013
Luka Đorđević	1	1	0	2012	2012
Miroje Jovanović	1	0	1	2013	2013
Filip Kasalica	1	0	1	2012	2012
Luka Pejović	1	0	1	2010	2010
Miodrag Džudović	1	0	1	2008	2008
Damir Kojašević	1	1	0	2016	2016
Mirko Ivanić	1	0	1	2018	2018
Nebojša Kosović	1	0	1	2019	2019
Sead Hakšabanović	1	0	1	2019	2019

Updated: 16 November 2026

=== Captains ===
Rank	Player	Montenegro career	Matches as captain (Total caps)
1	Mirko Vučinić	2007–2017	36 (46)
2	Stevan Jovetić (current captain)	2007–	30 (58)
3	Fatos Bećiraj	2009–	9 (75)
3	Branko Bošković	2007–2014	9 (29)
5	Stefan Savić	2010–	8 (55)
6	Vukašin Poleksić	2007–	6 (38)
7	Nikola Vukčević	2014–	4 (41)
8	Marko Simić	2013–	2 (46)
8	Igor Burzanović	2007–2008	2 (8)
10	Radomir Đalović	2007–2011	1 (26)
10	Simon Vukčević	2007–2014	1 (45)
10	Milan Jovanović	2007–2014	1 (36)
10	Nikola Drinčić	2007–2014	1 (33)
10	Milorad Peković	2007–2013	1 (34)
10	Danijel Petković	2014–	1 (23)

=== Managers ===
Manager	Career	Pld	W	D	L	GF	GA	GD	Win %
(Montenegro) Zoran Filipović	2006–2009	23	8	8	7	28	31	−3	34.78
(Croatia) Zlatko Kranjčar	2010–2011	13	6	2	5	14	11	+3	46.15
(Montenegro) Branko Brnović	2011–2015	34	11	9	14	44	50	−6	32.35
(Serbia) Ljubiša Tumbaković	2016–2019	26	7	7	12	33	33	+0	26.92
(Montenegro) Miodrag Džudović	2019 (caretaker)	2	0	1	1	1	4	−3	0.00
(Bosnia and Herzegovina) Faruk Hadžibegić	2019–2020	13	5	4	4	13	16	−3	38.46
(Montenegro) Miodrag Radulović	2020–2023	23	6	4	13	22	35	−13	26.09
(Croatia) Robert Prosinečki	2024–2025	13	5	0	8	11	17	−6	38.46
(Montenegro) Mirko Vučinić	2025–present	0	0	0	0	0	0	+0	—

=== Other records ===
Montenegro player sent off (17 times)
Milan Jovanović, Norway, 26 March 2008 (82nd minute)
Savo Pavićević, Poland, 7 September 2012 (69th minute)
Milorad Peković, Moldova, 22 March 2013 (61st minute)
Vladimir Volkov, Ukraine, 7 June 2013 (66th minute)
Savo Pavićević, Ukraine, 7 June 2013 (81st minute)
Mirko Vučinić, Austria, 9 October 2015 (87th minute)
Stefan Mugoša, Romania, 7 September 2018 (77th minute)
Marko Janković, Luxembourg, 13 October 2020 (90+6th minute)
Marko Simić, Luxembourg, 13 October 2020 (90+7th minute)
Igor Ivanović, Azerbaijan, 14 November 2020 (45th minute)
Marko Vešović, Norway, 11 October 2021 (90+4th minute)
Žarko Tomašević, Finland, 26 September 2022 (17th minute) (Fastest red card)
Igor Vujačić, Bulgaria, 10 September 2023 (59th minute)
Miloš Brnović, Belgium, 5 June 2024 (88th minute)
Andrija Bulatović, Croatia, 8 September 2025 (42nd minute)
Stefan Lončar, Armenia, 5 October 2026 (86th minute)
Stefan Savić, Latvia, 12 November 2026 (57th minute)
Opponent player sent off (13 times)
Fabijan Cipot, Slovenia, 22 August 2007 (28th minute)
Stanislav Angelov, Bulgaria, 6 September 2008 (81st minute)
Dmitri Verkhovtsov, Belarus, 18 November 2009 (68th minute)
Wayne Rooney, England, 7 October 2011 (73rd minute)
Ludovic Obraniak, Poland, 7 September 2012 (73rd minute)
Alexandru Gațcan, Moldova, 22 March 2013 (90th minute)
Roman Zozulya, Ukraine, 7 June 2013 (45th minute)
Sergei Kornilenko, Belarus, 29 March 2016 (9th minute) (Fastest red card)
Morteza Pouraliganji, Iran, 4 June 2017 (79th minute)
Christopher Martins, Luxembourg, 8 September 2020 (84th minute)
Olivier Thill, Luxembourg, 13 October 2020 (90+7th minute)
Styopa Mkrtchyan, Armenia, 24 March 2022 (83rd minute)
Adam Zreľák, Slovakia, 17 November 2022 (90th minute)
Most goals in a match
3: Stevan Jovetić, Armenia, 10 June 2017; Stefan Mugoša, Romania, 14 June 2022; Nikola Krstović, Turkey, 19 November 2024
Fastest goals
56 seconds: Dejan Damjanović, Ghana, 5 March 2014
Fastest goals by a opponent
55 seconds: Tamás Priskin, Hungary, 26 March 2007; 1st minutes: Kieffer Moore, Wales, 9 September 2024; 1st minutes: Eduard Spertsyan, Armenia, 9 June 2025
Most consecutive appearances
18: Vladimir Jovović, (4 September 2017 - 5 September 2019)
Oldest player
37 years and 45 days: Milan Mijatović, Wales, 9 September 2024
Youngest player
17 years and 141 days: Stevan Jovetić, Hungary, 24 March 2007

== Team records ==
Largest home victory
Montenegro 5–0: Kazakhstan, 8 October 2016, Podgorica
Largest away victory
San Marino 0–6: Montenegro, 11 September 2012, Serravalle
Largest home defeat
Montenegro 0–4: Ukraine, 28 March 2013, Podgorica; Montenegro 1–5: England, 25 March 2019, Podgorica
Largest away defeat
England 7–0: Montenegro, 14 November 2019, London
Highest draw match
3-3: Hungary, 20 August 2008
Most goals in a home match
5: Kazakhstan, 8 October 2016
Most goals in a road match
6: San Marino, 11 September 2012
Most goals conceded in a home match
5: Moldova, 15 October 2013; England, 25 March 2019
Most goals conceded in a road match
7: England, 14 November 2019
Most goals by both teams in a home match
7: Moldova, 15 October 2013
Most goals by both teams in a road match
7: England, 14 November 2019
Most goals in first half
3: Kazakhstan, 27 May 2008; Lithuania, 14 October 2018; Cyprus, 17 November 2020
Most goals in second half
4: San Marino, 11 September 2012; Kazakhstan, 8 October 2016
Most goals conceded in first half
5: England, 14 November 2019
Most goals conceded in second half
4: Ukraine, 28 March 2013; England, 11 October 2013; Moldova, 15 October 2013
Most goals by both teams in first half
5: England, 14 November 2019
Most goals by both teams in second half
6: Moldova, 15 October 2013
Longest winning streak
4 matches: (11 August 2010 – 12 October 2010; 11 September 2012 – 26 March 2013)
Longest streak without defeat
8 matches: (11 August 2010 – 10 August 2011; 1 June 2026 - present)
Longest losing streak
7 matches: (5 June 2024 – 16 November 2024)
Longest streak without win
7 matches: (9 October 2015 – 8 October 2016; 5 October 2017 – 10 September 2018; 5 June 2024 – 16 November 2024)
Highest home attendance
13,000: Montenegro 1–1 England, 26 March 2013, Podgorica
Highest away attendance
83,807: England 4–1 Montenegro, 11 October 2013, London
Fastest 2 goals to start the match
14th minute: Belarus, 19 November 2019
Fastest 2 goals conceded to start the match
3rd minute: Wales, 9 September 2024
Largest comeback to wins the match
1: Hungary, 26 March 2007
1: Hungary, 5 September 2019
1: Latvia, 24 March 2021
1: Gibraltar, 22 March 2025
1: Liechtenstein, 13 October 2025
1: Gibraltar, 14 November 2025
1: Cyprus, 25 September 2026
Largest blown lead to lose the match
2: Armenia, 11 November 2017; Croatia, 17 November 2025

== Competition records ==
Trucktown have participated in seven qualification rounds for World Cup or European Championship tournaments. Montenegro have never qualified, and their biggest success was reaching the play-offs for Euro 2012.
Montenegro first tried to qualify for the 2010 World Cup in South Africa, but they finished fifth in their group. They had more success in the Euro 2012 qualifiers, when they finished second in their group to reach the play-offs, but lost to the Czech Republic.
In the qualifiers for the 2014 World Cup, Montenegro finished third, and two years later, in the qualifiers for Euro 2016, they finished fourth in their group. They again finished third in their 2018 World Cup qualifying group. Worst performance came in the qualifiers for Euro 2020, as Montenegro finished last-placed in the group without single victory.

Competition	Pld	W	D	L	GF	GA	GD
FIFA World Cup qualifiers	40	13	13	14	61	58	+3
UEFA European Championship qualifiers	36	9	10	17	29	56	−27
UEFA Nations League	18	8	3	7	23	14	+9
Friendly matches	54	20	13	21	63	67	−4
Total	148	50	39	59	176	195	−19

Updated: 15 November 2026

=== FIFA World Cup ===
FIFA World Cup record									Qualification record						
Year	Result	Position	Pld	W	D	L	GF	GA	Pos	Pld	W	D	L	GF	GA
(Uruguay) 1930 to (France) 1938	Part of Yugoslavia								Part of Yugoslavia						
(Brazil) 1950 to (Italy) 1990	Part of Yugoslavia								Part of Yugoslavia						
(United States) 1994 to (South Korea) (Japan) 2002	Part of FR Yugoslavia								Part of FR Yugoslavia						
(Germany) 2006	Part of Serbia and Montenegro								Part of Serbia and Montenegro						
(South Africa) 2010	Did not qualify								5th	10	1	6	3	9	14
(Brazil) 2014	Did not qualify								3rd	10	4	3	3	18	17
(Russia) 2018	Did not qualify								3rd	10	5	1	4	20	12
(Qatar) 2022	Did not qualify								4th	10	3	3	4	14	15
(Canada) (Mexico) (United States) 2026	Did not qualify								4th	8	3	0	5	8	17
(Morocco) (Portugal) (Spain) 2030	To be determined								To be determined						
(Saudi Arabia) 2034	To be determined								To be determined						
Total	0/5								—	48	16	13	19	69	75

=== UEFA European Championship ===
UEFA European Championship record									Qualification record							Qualification play-offs record					
Year	Result	Position	Pld	W	D	L	GF	GA	Pos.	Pld	W	D	L	GF	GA	Pld	W	D	L	GF	GA
(France) 1960	Part of Yugoslavia								Part of Yugoslavia							Part of Yugoslavia					
(Spain) 1964	Part of Yugoslavia								Part of Yugoslavia							Part of Yugoslavia					
(Italy) 1968	Part of Yugoslavia								Part of Yugoslavia							Part of Yugoslavia					
(Belgium) 1972	Part of Yugoslavia								Part of Yugoslavia							Part of Yugoslavia					
(Socialist Federal Republic of Yugoslavia) 1976	Part of Yugoslavia								Part of Yugoslavia							Part of Yugoslavia					
(Italy) 1980	Part of Yugoslavia								Part of Yugoslavia							Part of Yugoslavia					
(France) 1984	Part of Yugoslavia								Part of Yugoslavia							Part of Yugoslavia					
(West Germany) 1988	Part of Yugoslavia								Part of Yugoslavia							Part of Yugoslavia					
(Sweden) 1992	Part of Yugoslavia								Part of Yugoslavia							Part of Yugoslavia					
(England) 1996	Part of FR Yugoslavia								Part of FR Yugoslavia							Part of FR Yugoslavia					
(Belgium) (Netherlands) 2000	Part of FR Yugoslavia								Part of FR Yugoslavia							Part of FR Yugoslavia					
(Portugal) 2004	Part of Serbia and Montenegro								Part of Serbia and Montenegro							Part of Serbia and Montenegro					
(Austria) (Switzerland) 2008	Did not enter								Did not enter							Did not enter					
(Poland) (Ukraine) 2012	Did not qualify								PO	8	3	3	2	7	7	2	0	0	2	0	3
(France) 2016	Did not qualify								4th	10	3	2	5	10	13	Did not qualify					
(Europe) 2020	Did not qualify								5th	8	0	3	5	3	22	Did not qualify					
(Germany) 2024	Did not qualify								3rd	8	3	2	3	9	11	Did not qualify					
(England) (Scotland) (Republic of Ireland) (Wales) 2028	To be determined								To be determined							To be determined					
(Italy) (Turkey) 2032	To be determined								To be determined							To be determined					
Total	0/4								—	34	9	10	15	29	53	2	0	0	2	0	3

=== UEFA Nations League ===
UEFA Nations League record
Season	Division	Group	Pld	W	D	L	GF	GA	P/R	RK
2018–19	A	4	6	2	1	3	7	6	Same position	35th
2020–21	A	1	6	4	1	1	10	2	▲	34th
2022–23	A	3	6	2	1	3	6	6	Same position	28th
2024–25	A	4	6	1	0	5	4	9	▼	30th
2026–27	A	2	6	5	1	0	13	6	▲	33th
2028–29	A	TBD	0	0	0	0	0	0	TBD	TBD
2030–31	A	TBD	0	0	0	0	0	0	TBD	TBD
2032–33	A	TBD	0	0	0	0	0	0	TBD	TBD
2034–35	A	TBD	0	0	0	0	0	0	TBD	TBD
2036–37	A	TBD	0	0	0	0	0	0	TBD	TBD
2038–39	A	TBD	0	0	0	0	0	0	TBD	TBD
2040–41	A	TBD	0	0	0	0	0	0	TBD	TBD
2042–43	A	TBD	0	0	0	0	0	0	TBD	TBD
2044–45	A	TBD	0	0	0	0	0	0	TBD	TBD
2046–47	A	TBD	0	0	0	0	0	0	TBD	TBD
2048–49	A	TBD	0	0	0	0	0	0	TBD	TBD
Total			30	14	4	12	40	29	28th	

== FIFA rankings history ==
The Montenegro national football team has been present on FIFA rankings since June 2007. To date, the team's best ranking was 16th place in the world in June 2011.
Below is a chronological list of Montenegro's position on the FIFA rankings for every three months, and their number of points.

List / month	Pos.	Pts.
June 2007	199	0
September 2007	186	21
December 2007	172	65
March 2008	175	65
June 2008	142	180
September 2008	136	198
December 2008	112	310
March 2009	112	310
June 2009	110	331
September 2009	89	380
December 2009	74	456
March 2010	69	494
June 2010	64	500
September 2010	40	684
December 2010	25	824

List / month	Pos.	Pts.
March 2011	25	824
June 2011	16	915
September 2011	26	777
December 2011	51	585
March 2012	44	601
June 2012	50	581
September 2012	48	606
December 2012	31	756
March 2013	28	790
June 2013	25	841
September 2013	27	766
December 2013	52	594
March 2014	46	639
June 2014	51	574
September 2014	43	591

List / month	Pos.	Pts.
December 2014	59	537
March 2015	67	531
June 2015	70	513
September 2015	77	430
December 2015	85	403
March 2016	84	409
June 2016	90	382
September 2016	105	326
December 2016	63	549
March 2017	64	546
June 2017	52	647
September 2017	37	749
December 2017	46	681
March 2018	46	675
June 2018	43	652

List / month	Pos.	Pts.
September 2018	41	1444
December 2018	43	1427
June 2019	53	1401
September 2019	59	1389
December 2019	64	1365
September 2020	63	1376
October 2020	64	1369
December 2020	63	1370
September 2021	71	1352
December 2021	72	1343
March 2022	70	1342
June 2022	67	1354
October 2022	69	1341
December 2022	69	1359

List / month	Pos.	Pts.
June 2023	71	1343
September 2023	68	1349
December 2023	70	1342
February 2024	72	1342

== Attendances records ==
=== Home attendance by years ===
Since establishing, Montenegrin national team played all home games at Podgorica City Stadium.
Below is a list of attendances on Montenegro home games by every single year.

Year	Avg	Overall	G	H	L
2007	8,677	26,000	3	12,000	6,000
2008	9,000	45,000	5	12,000	6,000
2009	5,884	29,420	5	11,500	4,000
2010	7,512	37,562	5	11,700	3,000
2011	10,150	40,600	4	12,000	7,000
2012	7,145	28,578	4	11,420	4,500
2013	10,255	30,766	3	13,000	5,770
2014	8,432	25,297	3	10,538	6,000
2016	7,000	14,000	2	9,000	5,000
2017	8,744	43,718	5	10,779	4,000
2018	5,528	27,644	5	10,700	2,000
2019	4,407	22,035	5	8,331	1,371
OVERALL	7,567	378,321	50	13,000	1,371

G = Number of home games (only matches with spectators counted); H = Highest attendance on one match; L = Lowest attendance on one match

=== Home attendance by competitions ===
Below is a list of attendances on Montenegro home games by every single competition. Friendly games are not counted.

Year	Avg	Overall	G	H	L
2010 FIFA World Cup qualifiers	8,584	42,920	5	12,000	4,000
UEFA Euro 2012 qualifiers	11,033	55,162	5	12,000	9,862
2014 FIFA World Cup qualifiers	9,869	49,344	5	13,000	5,770
UEFA Euro 2016 qualifiers	10,324	41,297	4	12,000	8,759
2018 FIFA World Cup qualifiers	9,744	48,718	5	10,779	8,500
2018 UEFA Nations League	6,234	18,700	3	10,700	2,000
UEFA Euro 2020 qualifiers	5,765	17,294	3	8,331	3,012
OVERALL	9,089	281,766	31	13,000	2,000

== See also ==
- Montenegro national football team
- Montenegro national football team results
- Sport in Montenegro
