= Montenegro national football team results =

As a member of FIFA and UEFA, the Montenegro national football team has been playing official matches since March 2007. Montenegro plays in the qualifiers for the FIFA World Cup and UEFA European Championship, as well as partaking in the UEFA Nations League. Apart from that, the team participates in friendly matches.

== List of matches ==
=== 2007 ===
26 March Friendly	Montenegro	2–1	Hungary	Podgorica, Montenegro
18:00 UTC+1	Vučinić 63' (pen.); Burzanović 83' (pen.)	Report	Priskin 1'	Stadium: Podgorica City Stadium; Attendance: 12,000; Referee: Robert Krajnc (Slovenia)
Note: First game and win of Montenegro.

1 June Kirin Cup	Japan	2–0	Montenegro	Fukuroi, Japan
19:15 UTC+9	Nakazawa 23'; Takahara 38'	Report		Stadium: Shizuoka Stadium; Attendance: 28,635; Referee: Michael Svendsen (Denmark)
Note: First Loss of Montenegro.

3 June Kirin Cup	Colombia	1–0	Montenegro	Matsumoto, Japan
13:15 UTC+9	Falcao 33'	Report		Stadium: Matsumotodaira Football Stadium; Attendance: 10,070; Referee: Kenji Ogiya (Japan)

22 August Friendly	Montenegro	1–1	Slovenia	Podgorica, Montenegro
20:15 UTC+2	Vučinić 28' (pen.)	Report	Vršič 42'	Stadium: Podgorica City Stadium; Attendance: 8,000; Referee: Claudio Circhetta (Switzerland)
Note: First Draw of Montenegro.

12 September Friendly	Montenegro	1–2	Sweden	Podgorica, Montenegro
18:30 UTC+2	Vučinić 16'	Report	Rosenberg 71'; Prica 75'	Stadium: Podgorica City Stadium; Attendance: 6,000; Referee: Bernhard Brugger (Austria)
Note: First Loss of Montenegro in Montenegro. First non-penalty goal scored by Montenegro.

17 October Friendly	Estonia	0–1	Montenegro	Tallinn, Estonia
18:00 UTC+3		Report	Vučinić 41'	Stadium: A. Le Coq Arena; Attendance: 2,500; Referee: Peter Fröjdfeldt (Sweden)

=== 2008 ===
26 March Friendly	Montenegro	3–1	Norway	Podgorica, Montenegro
19:30 UTC+1	Burzanović 7'; Bošković 37'; Đalović 60'	Report	Carew 72'	Stadium: Podgorica City Stadium; Attendance: 8,000; Referee: Aleksandar Stavrev (Macedonia)
Note: First Win in Montenegro against a Nordic County

27 May Friendly	Montenegro	3–0	Kazakhstan	Podgorica, Montenegro
20:00 UTC+2	Đalović 15', 45'; Drinčić 21'	Report		Stadium: Podgorica City Stadium; Attendance: 5,000; Referee: Abby Toussaint (Luxembourg)

31 May Friendly	Romania	4–0	Montenegro	Bucharest, Romania
20:45 UTC+3	Mutu 15'; Ghionea 49'; Dică 55', 69'	Report		Stadium: Stadionul Steaua; Attendance: 7,000; Referee: Alexandru Tudor (Romania)
Note: Record Loss for Montenegro

20 August Friendly	Hungary	3–3	Montenegro	Budapest, Hungary
18:00 UTC+2	Priskin 29'; Hajnal 55', 88' (pen.)	Report	Jovetić 45', 68'; Vukčević 51'	Stadium: Ferenc Puskás Stadium; Attendance: 4,913; Referee: Richard Havrilla (Slovakia)

6 September 2010 FIFA World Cup qualification	Montenegro	2–2	Bulgaria	Podgorica, Montenegro
20:00 UTC+2	Vučinić 61'; Jovetić 82' (pen.)	Report	Petrov 11'; Georgiev 90+2'	Stadium: Podgorica City Stadium; Attendance: 9,000; Referee: Oleh Oriekhov (Ukraine)

10 September 2010 FIFA World Cup qualification	Montenegro	0–0	Republic of Ireland	Podgorica, Montenegro
19:00 UTC+2		Report		Stadium: Podgorica City Stadium; Attendance: 12,000; Referee: Sten Kaldma (Estonia)

15 October 2010 FIFA World Cup qualification	Italy	2–1	Montenegro	Lecce, Italy
20:50 UTC+2	Aquilani 8', 29'	Report	Vučinić 19'	Stadium: Stadio Via del Mare; Attendance: 20,162; Referee: Pedro Proença (Portugal)

19 November Friendly	Montenegro	2–1	Macedonia	Podgorica, Montenegro
17:30 UTC+1	Džudović 24'; Jovetić 33' (pen.)	Report	Popov 85' (pen.)	Stadium: Podgorica City Stadium; Attendance: 5,000; Referee: Novo Panić (Bosnia and Herzegovina)

=== 2009 ===
28 March 2010 FIFA World Cup qualification	Montenegro	0–2	Italy	Podgorica, Montenegro
20:45 UTC+1		Report	Pirlo 11' (pen.); Pazzini 73'	Stadium: Podgorica City Stadium; Attendance: 10,500; Referee: Martin Atkinson (England)

1 April 2010 FIFA World Cup qualification	Georgia	0–0	Montenegro	Tbilisi, Georgia
21:00 UTC+4		Report		Stadium: Dinamo Arena; Attendance: 16,000; Referee: David Malcolm (Northern Ireland)

6 June 2010 FIFA World Cup qualification	Cyprus	2–2	Montenegro	Larnaca, Cyprus
20:30 UTC+3	Konstantinou 13'; Michael 45' (pen.)	Report	Damjanović 65', 77'	Stadium: Antonis Papadopoulos Stadium; Attendance: 3,000; Referee: Carlos Velasco Carballo (Spain)

12 August Friendly	Montenegro	2–1	Wales	Podgorica, Montenegro
20:30 UTC+2	Jovetić 28' (pen.); Đalović 45'	Report	Vokes 52'	Stadium: Podgorica City Stadium; Attendance: 5,000; Referee: Milorad Mažić (Serbia)

5 September 2010 FIFA World Cup qualification	Bulgaria	4–1	Montenegro	Sofia, Bulgaria
20:30 UTC+3	Kishishev 45+1'; Telkiyski 49'; Berbatov 83'; Domovchiyski 90+1'	Report	Jovetić 9'	Stadium: Vasil Levski National Stadium; Attendance: 7,543; Referee: Tony Asumaa (Finland)

9 September 2010 FIFA World Cup qualification	Montenegro	1–1	Cyprus	Podgorica, Montenegro
20:15 UTC+2	Vučinić 56'	Report	Okkas 63'	Stadium: Podgorica City Stadium; Attendance: 4,000; Referee: Carlo Bertolini (Switzerland)

10 October 2010 FIFA World Cup qualification	Montenegro	2–1	Georgia	Podgorica, Montenegro
19:00 UTC+2	Batak 13'; Delibašić 78'	Report	Vladimir 45'	Stadium: Podgorica City Stadium; Attendance: 5,420; Referee: Selçuk Dereli (Turkey)
Note: First Competitive win

14 October 2010 FIFA World Cup qualification	Republic of Ireland	0–0	Montenegro	Dublin, Ireland
19:00 UTC+1		Report		Stadium: Croke Park; Attendance: 36,442; Referee: Vladimír Hriňák (Slovakia)

18 November Friendly	Montenegro	1–0	Belarus	Podgorica, Montenegro
17:00 UTC+1	Vučinić 80'	Report		Stadium: Podgorica City Stadium; Attendance: 5,000; Referee: Aleksandar Stavrev (Macedonia)

=== 2010 ===
3 March Friendly	Macedonia	2–1	Montenegro	Skopje, Macedonia
14:30 UTC+1	Naumoski 27'; Pandev 30'	Report	Baša 62'	Stadium: Philip II Arena; Attendance: 7,000; Referee: Albano Janku (Albania)

25 May Friendly	Montenegro	0–1	Albania	Podgorica, Montenegro
20:15 UTC+2		Report	Salihi 79'	Stadium: Podgorica City Stadium; Attendance: 7,000; Referee: Marijo Strahonja (Croatia)

29 May Friendly	Norway	2–1	Montenegro	Oslo, Norway
16:00 UTC+2	Grindheim 44'; Pedersen 89'	Report	Vučinić 82'	Stadium: Ullevaal Stadion; Attendance: 13,132; Referee: Jonas Eriksson (Sweden)

11 August Friendly	Montenegro	2–0	Northern Ireland	Podgorica, Montenegro
20:30 UTC+2	Đalović 43', 59'	Report		Stadium: Podgorica City Stadium; Attendance: 5,000; Referee: Boško Jovanetić (Serbia)

3 September UEFA Euro 2012 qualifying	Montenegro	1–0	Wales	Podgorica, Montenegro
19:30 UTC+2	Vučinić 30'	Report		Stadium: Podgorica City Stadium; Attendance: 7,442; Referee: Anastasios Kakos (Greece)

7 September UEFA Euro 2012 qualifying	Bulgaria	0–1	Montenegro	Sofia, Bulgaria
20:30 UTC+3		Report	Zverotić 35'	Stadium: Vasil Levski National Stadium; Attendance: 9,470; Referee: Vladislav Bezborodov (Russia)

8 October UEFA Euro 2012 qualifying	Montenegro	1–0	Switzerland	Podgorica, Montenegro
20:30 UTC+2	Vučinić 67'	Report		Stadium: Podgorica City Stadium; Attendance: 10,750; Referee: Eduardo Iturralde González (Spain)

12 October UEFA Euro 2012 qualifying	England	0–0	Montenegro	London, England
20:00 UTC+1		Report		Stadium: Wembley Stadium; Attendance: 73,451; Referee: Manuel Gräfe (Germany)

17 November Friendly	Montenegro	2–0	Azerbaijan	Podgorica, Montenegro
13:00 UTC+1	Pejović 63'; Bećiraj 74'	Report		Stadium: Podgorica City Stadium; Attendance: 2,000; Referee: Aleksandar Stavrev (Macedonia)

=== 2011 ===
25 March Friendly	Montenegro	1–0	Uzbekistan	Podgorica, Montenegro
18:00 UTC+1	Vukčević 90'	Report		Stadium: Podgorica City Stadium; Attendance: 7,000; Referee: Vlado Glođović (Serbia)

4 June UEFA Euro 2012 qualifying	Montenegro	1–1	Bulgaria	Podgorica, Montenegro
20:30 UTC+2	Đalović 53'	Report	I. Popov 66'	Stadium: Podgorica City Stadium; Attendance: 11,500; Referee: Alon Yefet (Israel)

10 August Friendly	Albania	3–2	Montenegro	Shkodër, Albania
20:00 UTC+2	Bogdani 32'; Hyka 64'; Salihi 70'	Report	Savić 40', 47'	Stadium: Loro Boriçi Stadium; Attendance: 5,000; Referee: Anton Genov (Bulgaria)

2 September UEFA Euro 2012 qualifying	Wales	2–1	Montenegro	Cardiff, Wales
19:45 UTC+1	Morison 29'; Ramsey 50'	Report	Jovetić 71'	Stadium: Cardiff City Stadium; Attendance: 8,914; Referee: Luca Banti (Italy)

7 October UEFA Euro 2012 qualifying	Montenegro	2–2	England	Podgorica, Montenegro
21:00 UTC+1	Zverotić 45'; Delibašić 90+1'	Report	Young 10'; Bent 31'	Stadium: Podgorica City Stadium; Attendance: 11,340; Referee: Wolfgang Stark (Germany)

11 October UEFA Euro 2012 qualifying	Switzerland	2–0	Montenegro	Basel, Switzerland
20:15 UTC+2	Derdiyok 51'; Lichtsteiner 65'	Report		Stadium: St. Jakob-Park; Attendance: 19,997; Referee: Olegário Benquerença (Portugal)

11 November UEFA Euro 2012 qualifying play-offs	Czech Republic	2–0	Montenegro	Prague, Czech Republic
20:15 UTC+1	Pilař 63'; Sivok 90+2'	Report		Stadium: Generali Arena; Attendance: 14,560; Referee: Martin Atkinson (England)

15 November UEFA Euro 2012 qualifying play-offs	Montenegro	0–1 (0–3 agg.)	Czech Republic	Podgorica, Montenegro
20:15 UTC+1		Report	Jiráček 81'	Stadium: Podgorica City Stadium; Attendance: 10,100; Referee: Nicola Rizzoli (Italy)

=== 2012 ===
29 February Friendly	Montenegro	2–1	Iceland	Podgorica, Montenegro
18:00 UTC+1	Jovetić 56', 88'	Report	Finnbogason 79'	Stadium: Podgorica City Stadium; Attendance: 5,500; Referee: Ognjen Valjić (Bosnia and Herzegovina)

25 May Friendly	Belgium	2–2	Montenegro	Brussels, Belgium
20:45 UTC+2	Mirallas 25'; Hazard 34' (pen.)	Report	Vučinić 5'; Drinčić 76'	Stadium: King Baudouin Stadium; Attendance: 21,110; Referee: Clément Turpin (France)

15 August Friendly	Montenegro	2–0	Latvia	Podgorica, Montenegro
20:30 UTC+2	Jovetić 36'; Kasalica 76'	Report		Stadium: Podgorica City Stadium; Attendance: 4,500; Referee: Danilo Grujić (Serbia)

7 September 2014 FIFA World Cup qualification	Montenegro	2–2	Poland	Podgorica, Montenegro
20:30 UTC+2	Drinčić 27'; Vučinić 45+2'	Report	Błaszczykowski 6' (pen.); Mierzejewski 55'	Stadium: Podgorica City Stadium; Attendance: 11,420; Referee: Kristinn Jakobsson (Iceland)

11 September 2014 FIFA World Cup qualification	San Marino	0–6	Montenegro	Serravalle, San Marino
20:30 UTC+2		Report	Đorđević 24'; Bećiraj 26', 51'; Zverotić 69'; Delibašić 78', 82'	Stadium: Stadio Olimpico; Attendance: 1,947; Referee: Neil Doyle (Ireland)

16 October 2014 FIFA World Cup qualification	Ukraine	0–1	Montenegro	Kyiv, Ukraine
21:00 UTC+3		Report	Damjanović 45'	Stadium: Olympic Stadium; Attendance: 50,957; Referee: Michael Koukoulakis (Greece)

14 November 2014 FIFA World Cup qualification	Montenegro	3–0	San Marino	Podgorica, Montenegro
18:00 UTC+1	Delibašić 14', 31'; Zverotić 68'	Report		Stadium: Podgorica City Stadium; Attendance: 7,158; Referee: Sándor Szabó (Hungary)

=== 2013 ===
22 March 2014 FIFA World Cup qualification	Moldova	0–1	Montenegro	Chișinău, Moldova
21:30 UTC+2		Report	Vučinić 78'	Stadium: Zimbru Stadium; Attendance: 5,400; Referee: Daniele Orsato (Italy)

26 March 2014 FIFA World Cup qualification	Montenegro	1–1	England	Podgorica, Montenegro
21:00 UTC+1	Damjanović 76'	Report	Rooney 6'	Stadium: Podgorica City Stadium; Attendance: 13,000; Referee: Jonas Eriksson (Sweden)

7 June 2014 FIFA World Cup qualification	Montenegro	0–4	Ukraine	Podgorica, Montenegro
20:30 UTC+2		Report	Harmash 52'; Konoplyanka 77'; Fedetskiy 85'; Bezus 90+3'	Stadium: Podgorica City Stadium; Attendance: 11,996; Referee: Manuel Gräfe (Germany)
Note: Record-equalling defeat; record defeat at home.

14 August Friendly	Belarus	1–1	Montenegro	Zhodzina, Belarus
18:30 UTC+3	Kornilenko 16' (pen.)	Report	Vučinić 62'	Stadium: Torpedo Stadium; Attendance: 3,000; Referee: Kristo Tohver (Estonia)

6 September 2014 FIFA World Cup qualification	Poland	1–1	Montenegro	Warsaw, Poland
20:45 UTC+2	Lewandowski 16'	/	Damjanović 12'	Stadium: National Stadium; Attendance: 45,652; Referee: Björn Kuipers (Netherlands)

11 October 2014 FIFA World Cup qualification	England	4–1	Montenegro	London, England
20:00 UTC+1	Rooney 49'; Bošković 62' (o.g.); Townsend 78'; Sturridge 90+3' (pen.)	Report	Damjanović 71'	Stadium: Wembley Stadium; Attendance: 83,807; Referee: Alberto Undiano Mallenco (Spain)

15 October 2014 FIFA World Cup qualification	Montenegro	2–5	Moldova	Podgorica, Montenegro
21:00 UTC+2	Jovetić 55' (pen.), 90+1'	Report	Antoniuc 28', 89'; Armaș 62'; Sidorenco 64'; Ioniță 73'	Stadium: Podgorica City Stadium; Attendance: 5,770; Referee: Robert Schörgenhofer (Austria)

17 November Friendly	Luxembourg	1–4	Montenegro	Luxembourg City, Luxembourg
19:00 UTC+1	Deville 67'	Report	Baša 38' (pen.); Zverotić 57'; Jovanović 70'; Ćetković 81'	Stadium: Stade Josy Barthel; Attendance: 1,775; Referee: Tobias Welz (Germany)

=== 2014 ===
5 March Friendly	Montenegro	1–0	Ghana	Podgorica, Montenegro
18:00 UTC+1	Damjanović 1' (pen.)	Report		Stadium: Podgorica City Stadium; Attendance: 5,500; Referee: Vlado Glodjović (Serbia)

23 May Friendly	Slovakia	2–0	Montenegro	Senec, Slovakia
20:20 UTC+2	Weiss 45'; Jendrišek 86'	Report		Stadium: NTC Senec; Attendance: 2,587; Referee: Bartosz Frankowski (Poland)

26 May Friendly	Iran	0–0	Montenegro	Hartberg, Austria
18:30 UTC+2		Report		Stadium: Profertil Arena; Attendance: 1,000; Referee: Rene Eisner (Austria)

8 September UEFA Euro 2016 qualifying	Montenegro	2–0	Moldova	Podgorica, Montenegro
20:45 UTC+2	Vučinić 45+2'; Tomašević 73'	Report		Stadium: Stadion pod Goricom; Attendance: 8,759; Referee: Aleksei Kulbakov (Belarus)

9 October UEFA Euro 2016 qualifying	Liechtenstein	0–0	Montenegro	Vaduz, Liechtenstein
20:45 UTC+2		Report		Stadium: Rheinpark Stadion; Attendance: 2,790; Referee: Simon Lee Evans (Wales)

12 October UEFA Euro 2016 qualifying	Austria	1–0	Montenegro	Vienna, Austria
18:00 UTC+2	Okotie 24'	Report		Stadium: Ernst-Happel-Stadion; Attendance: 44,200; Referee: Bas Nijhuis (Netherlands)

15 November UEFA Euro 2016 qualifying	Montenegro	1–1	Sweden	Podgorica, Montenegro
20:45 UTC+1	Jovetić 80' (pen.)	Report	Ibrahimović 9'	Stadium: Stadion pod Goricom; Attendance: 10,538; Referee: Willie Collum (Scotland)

=== 2015 ===
27 March UEFA Euro 2016 qualifying	Montenegro	0–3 (awarded)	Russia	Podgorica, Montenegro
20:45 UTC+1		Report		Stadium: Stadion pod Goricom; Attendance: 12,000; Referee: Deniz Aytekin (Germany)
Note: Match abandoned and awarded to Russia due to crowd disturbances.

8 June Friendly	Denmark	2–1	Montenegro	Viborg, Denmark
20:00 UTC+2	Eriksen 71'; Fischer 86' (pen.)	Report	Jovetić 17'	Stadium: Energi Viborg Arena; Attendance: 9,180; Referee: Ken Henry Johnsen (Norway)

14 June UEFA Euro 2016 qualifying	Sweden	3–1	Montenegro	Solna, Sweden
20:45 UTC+2	Berg 37'; Ibrahimović 40', 44'	Report	Damjanović 64' (pen.)	Stadium: Friends Arena; Attendance: 32,224; Referee: Hüseyin Göçek (Turkey)

5 September UEFA Euro 2016 qualifying	Montenegro	2–0	Liechtenstein	Podgorica, Montenegro
20:45 UTC+2	Beciraj 38'; Jovetić 56'	Report		Stadium: Stadion pod Goricom; Attendance: 0 Referee: Javier Estrada Fernández (Spain)
Note: Match played behind closed doors due to UEFA order.

8 September UEFA Euro 2016 qualifying	Moldova	0–2	Montenegro	Chișinău, Moldova
21:45 UTC+3		Report	Savić 9'; Racu 65' (o.g.)	Stadium: Zimbru Stadium; Attendance: 6,243; Referee: Sébastien Delferière (Belgium)

9 October UEFA Euro 2016 qualifying	Montenegro	2–3	Austria	Podgorica, Montenegro
20:45 UTC+2	Vučinić 32'; Beciraj 68'	Report	Janko 56'; Arnautović 81'; Sabitzer 90+2'	Stadium: Stadion pod Goricom; Attendance: 7,107; Referee: Daniele Orsato (Italy)

12 October UEFA Euro 2016 qualifying	Russia	2–0	Montenegro	Moscow, Russia
19:00 UTC+3	Kuzmin 34'; Kokorin 37'	Report		Stadium: Otkrytie Arena; Attendance: 35,604; Referee: Svein Oddvar Moen (Norway)

12 November Friendly	Macedonia	4–1	Montenegro	Skopje, Macedonia
18:00 UTC+1	Sikov 35'; Trajkovski 38', 40', 63'	Report	Jovetić 88'	Stadium: Philip II Arena; Attendance: 500; Referee: Ivaylo Stoyanov (Bulgaria)

=== 2016 ===
24 March Friendly	Greece	2–1	Montenegro	Piraeus, Greece
18:00 UTC+2	Tzavellas 54'; Karelis 63'	Report	Tomašević 56'	Stadium: Karaiskakis Stadium; Attendance: 4,450; Referee: István Kovács (Romania)

29 March Friendly	Montenegro	0–0	Belarus	Podgorica, Montenegro
18:00 UTC+2		Report		Stadium: Stadion pod Goricom; Attendance: 5,500; Referee: Danilo Grujić (Serbia)

29 May Friendly	Turkey	1–0	Montenegro	Antalya, Turkey
20:45 UTC+3	Topal 90+4'	Report		Stadium: Antalya Stadium; Attendance: 30,000; Referee: Daniel Siebert (Germany)

4 September 2018 FIFA World Cup qualification	Romania	1–1	Montenegro	Cluj-Napoca, Romania
21:45 UTC+3	Popa 85'	Report	Jovetić 87'	Stadium: Cluj Arena; Attendance: 25,468; Referee: Anthony Taylor (England)

8 October 2018 FIFA World Cup qualification	Montenegro	5–0	Kazakhstan	Podgorica, Montenegro
18:00 UTC+2	Tomašević 24'; N. Vukčević 59'; Jovetić 64'; Bećiraj 73'; Savić 78'	Report		Stadium: Podgorica City Stadium; Attendance: 8,517; Referee: Robert Schörgenhofer (Austria)

11 October 2018 FIFA World Cup qualification	Denmark	0–1	Montenegro	Copenhagen, Denmark
20:45 UTC+2		Report	Bećiraj 32'	Stadium: Parken Stadium; Attendance: 20,852; Referee: Alberto Undiano Mallenco (Spain)

11 November 2018 FIFA World Cup qualification	Armenia	3–2	Montenegro	Yerevan, Armenia
21:00 UTC+4	Grigoryan 50'; Haroyan 74'; Ghazaryan 90+3'	Report	Kojašević 36'; Jovetić 38'	Stadium: Vazgen Sargsyan Republican Stadium; Attendance: 3,500; Referee: Pavel Královec (Czech Republic)

=== 2017 ===
26 March 2018 FIFA World Cup qualification	Montenegro	1–2	Poland	Podgorica, Montenegro
18:00 UTC+2	Mugoša 62'	Report	Lewandowski 40'; Piszczek 82'	Stadium: Podgorica City Stadium; Attendance: 10,439; Referee: Viktor Kassai (Hungary)

4 June Friendly	Montenegro	1–2	Iran	Podgorica, Montenegro
20:30 UTC+2	Jovetić 32'	Report	Azmoun 10', 60'	Stadium: Podgorica City Stadium; Attendance: 4,500; Referee: Dejan Jakimovski (Macedonia)

10 June 2018 FIFA World Cup qualification	Montenegro	4–1	Armenia	Podgorica, Montenegro
20:45 UTC+2	Beqiraj 2'; Jovetić 28', 54', 82'	Report	Koryan 89'	Stadium: Podgorica City Stadium; Attendance: 6,861; Referee: Kevin Blom (Netherlands)

1 September 2018 FIFA World Cup qualification	Kazakhstan	0–3	Montenegro	Astana, Kazakhstan
22:00 UTC+6		Report	Vešović 31'; Beqiraj 53'; Simić 63'	Stadium: Astana Arena; Attendance: 16,511; Referee: Sébastien Delferière (Belgium)

4 September 2018 FIFA World Cup qualification	Montenegro	1–0	Romania	Podgorica, Montenegro
20:45 UTC+2	Jovetić 75'	Report		Stadium: Podgorica City Stadium; Attendance: 9,452; Referee: Craig Thomson (Scotland)

5 October 2018 FIFA World Cup qualification	Montenegro	0–1	Denmark	Podgorica, Montenegro
20:45 UTC+2		Report	Eriksen 16'	Stadium: Podgorica City Stadium; Attendance: 10,779; Referee: Björn Kuipers (Netherlands)

8 October 2018 FIFA World Cup qualification	Poland	4–2	Montenegro	Warsaw, Poland
18:00 UTC+2	Mączyński 6'; Grosicki 16'; Lewandowski 85'; Stojković 87' (og.)	Report	Mugoša 78'; Tomašević 83'	Stadium: National Stadium; Attendance: 57,538; Referee: Daniele Orsato (Italy)

=== 2018 ===
23 March Friendly	Cyprus	0–0	Montenegro	Nicosia, Cyprus
18:00 UTC+2		Report		Stadium: GSP Stadium; Attendance: 300; Referee: Roi Reinshreiber (Israel)

27 March Friendly	Montenegro	2–2	Turkey	Podgorica, Montenegro
19:10 UTC+2	Ivanić 45'; Mugoša 87'	Report	Ünder 11'; Yokuşlu 23'	Stadium: Podgorica City Stadium; Attendance: 6,000; Referee: Milorad Mažić (Serbia)

28 May Friendly	Bosnia and Herzegovina	0–0	Montenegro	Zenica, Bosnia and Herzegovina
18:00 UTC+2		Report		Stadium: Bilino Polje; Attendance: 5,215; Referee: Dimitar Mečkarovski (Macedonia)

2 June Friendly	Montenegro	0–2	Slovenia	Podgorica, Montenegro
20:15 UTC+2		Report	Bezjak 39' (pen.); Zajc 79'	Stadium: Podgorica City Stadium; Attendance: 2,944; Referee: Igor Pajić (Croatia)

7 September 2018–19 UEFA Nations League C	Romania	0–0	Montenegro	Ploiești, Romania
21:45 UTC+3		Report		Stadium: Ilie Oană Stadium; Attendance: 0 Referee: Ivan Kružliak (Slovakia)
Note: The Romania v Montenegro match will be played behind closed doors due to a UEFA punishment against Romania for racist behaviour in their UEFA Euro 2016 qualifying home match against Greece.

10 September 2018–19 UEFA Nations League C	Montenegro	2–0	Lithuania	Podgorica, Montenegro
20:45 UTC+2	Savić 34' (pen.); Janković 35'	Report		Stadium: Podgorica City Stadium; Attendance: 5,239; Referee: Jakob Kehlet (Denmark)

11 October 2018–19 UEFA Nations League C	Montenegro	0–2	Serbia	Podgorica, Montenegro
20:45 UTC+2		Report	Mitrović 18' (pen.), 81'	Stadium: Podgorica City Stadium; Attendance: 9,394; Referee: Gianluca Rocchi (Italy)

14 October 2018–19 UEFA Nations League C	Lithuania	1–4	Montenegro	Vilnius, Lithuania
21:45 UTC+3	Baravykas 88'	Report	Mugoša 10' (pen.), 45+1'; Kopitović 35'; Zorić 86'	Stadium: LFF Stadium; Attendance: 1,515; Referee: Robert Schörgenhofer (Austria)

17 November 2018–19 UEFA Nations League C	Serbia	2–1	Montenegro	Belgrade, Serbia
15:00 UTC+2	Ljajić 30'; Mitrović 32'	Report	Mugoša 70'	Stadium: Red Star Stadium; Attendance: 15,416; Referee: Alberto Undiano Mallenco (Spain)

20 November 2018–19 UEFA Nations League C	Montenegro	0–1	Romania	Podgorica, Montenegro
20:45 UTC+2		Report	Țucudean 44'	Stadium: Podgorica City Stadium; Attendance: 3,574; Referee: Felix Zwayer (Germany)

=== 2019 ===
22 March UEFA Euro 2020 qualifying	Bulgaria	1–1	Montenegro	Sofia, Bulgaria
20:45 UTC+2	Nedelev 82' (pen.)	Report	Mugoša 50'	Stadium: Vasil Levski National Stadium; Attendance: 5,652; Referee: Ruddy Buquet (France)

25 March UEFA Euro 2020 qualifying	Montenegro	1–5	England	Podgorica, Montenegro
20:45 UTC+1	Vešović 18'	Report	Keane 30'; Barkley 39', 59'; Kane 71'; Sterling 81'	Stadium: Podgorica City Stadium; Attendance: 8,329; Referee: Aleksei Kulbakov (Belarus)

7 June UEFA Euro 2020 qualifying	Montenegro	1–1	Kosovo	Podgorica, Montenegro
20:45 UTC+2	Mugoša 69'	Report	Rashica 24'	Stadium: Podgorica City Stadium; Attendance: 100; Referee: Daniele Orsato (Italy)
Note: Montenegro were sanctioned by UEFA to play one home match without spectators for racist behaviour in their home match against England.

10 June UEFA Euro 2020 qualifying	Czech Republic	3–0	Montenegro	Olomouc, Czech Republic
20:45 UTC+2	Jankto 18'; Kopitović 49' (o.g.); Schick 82' (pen.)	Report		Stadium: Andrův stadion Attendance: 11,565; Referee: Vladislav Bezborodov (Russia)

5 September Friendly	Montenegro	2–1	Hungary	Podgorica, Montenegro
20:45 UTC+2	Kosović 32'; Mugoša 75' (pen.)	Report	Holender 2'	Stadium: Podgorica City Stadium; Attendance: 3,370; Referee: Dimitar Mečkarovski (North Macedonia)

10 September UEFA Euro 2020 qualifying	Montenegro	0–3	Czech Republic	Podgorica, Montenegro
20:45 UTC+2		Report	Souček 54'; Masopust 58'; Darida 90+5' (pen.)	Stadium: Podgorica City Stadium; Attendance: 5,951; Referee: Ali Palabıyık (Turkey)

11 October UEFA Euro 2020 qualifying	Montenegro	0–0	Bulgaria	Podgorica, Montenegro
20:45 UTC+2		Report		Stadium: Podgorica City Stadium; Attendance: 3,012; Referee: Andreas Ekberg (Sweden)

14 October UEFA Euro 2020 qualifying	Kosovo	2–0	Montenegro	Pristina, Kosovo
20:45 UTC+2	Rrahmani 10'; Muriqi 35'	Report		Stadium: Fadil Vokrri Stadium; Attendance: 12,494; Referee: Artur Soares Dias (Portugal)

14 November UEFA Euro 2020 qualifying	England	7–0	Montenegro	London, England
20:45 UTC+0	Oxlade-Chamberlain 11'; Kane 19', 24', 37'; Rashford 30'; Šofranac 66' (o.g.); Abraham 84'	Report		Stadium: Wembley Stadium; Attendance: 77,277; Referee: Antonio Mateu Lahoz (Spain)
Note: Record Loss for Montenegro

19 November Friendly	Montenegro	2–0	Belarus	Podgorica, Montenegro
18:00 UTC+1	Mugoša 9'; Hakšabanović 14'	Report		Stadium: Podgorica City Stadium; Attendance: 1,371; Referee: Trustin Farrugia Cann (Malta)

=== 2020 ===
5 September 2020–21 UEFA Nations League C	Cyprus	0–2	Montenegro	Nicosia, Cyprus
19:00 UTC+3		Report	Jovetić 60', 73'	Stadium: GSP Stadium; Attendance: 0 Referee: Harm Osmers (Germany)

8 September 2020–21 UEFA Nations League C	Luxembourg	0–1	Montenegro	Luxembourg City, Luxembourg
20:45 UTC+2		Report	Bećiraj 90+3' (pen.)	Stadium: Stade Josy Barthel; Attendance: 0 Referee: Lawrence Visser (Belgium)

7 October Friendly	Montenegro	1–1	Latvia	Podgorica, Montenegro
20:45 UTC+2	Ivanović 90+1'	Report	Tarasovs 26'	Stadium: Podgorica City Stadium; Attendance: 0 Referee: Admir Šehović (Bosnia and Herzegovina)
Note: Match originally scheduled for 26 March 2020, but postponed due to a spike in COVID-19 cases.

10 October 2020–21 UEFA Nations League C	Montenegro	2–0	Azerbaijan	Podgorica, Montenegro
15:00 UTC+2	Jovetić 9'; Ivanović 71'	Report		Stadium: Podgorica City Stadium; Attendance: 0 Referee: Ricardo de Burgos Bengoetxea (Spain)

13 October 2020–21 UEFA Nations League C	Montenegro	1–2	Luxembourg	Podgorica, Montenegro
20:45 UTC+2	Ivanović 34'	Report	Muratović 42'; Sinani 86'	Stadium: Podgorica City Stadium; Attendance: 0 Referee: Sascha Stegemann (Germany)

11 November Friendly	Montenegro	0–0	Kazakhstan	Podgorica, Montenegro
18:00 UTC+1		Report		Stadium: Podgorica City Stadium; Attendance: 0 Referee: Dimitar Meckarovski (North Macedonia)

14 November 2020–21 UEFA Nations League C	Azerbaijan	0–0	Montenegro	Zaprešić, Croatia
18:00 UTC+1		Report		Stadium: Ivan Laljak-Ivić Stadium; Attendance: 0 Referee: Sergey Ivanov (Russia)
Note: The Azerbaijan v Montenegro match, originally scheduled to be played at Olympic Stadium, Baku, was moved to a neutral venue, as UEFA announced on 20 October 2020 to temporarily suspend all UEFA matches taking place in Armenia and Azerbaijan until further notice due to the Nagorno-Karabakh conflict.

17 November 2020–21 UEFA Nations League C	Montenegro	4–0	Cyprus	Podgorica, Montenegro
20:45 UTC+1	Jovetić 14'; Boljević 25', 28'; Mugoša 60'	Report		Stadium: Podgorica City Stadium; Attendance: 0 Referee: Eitan Shemeulevitch (Israel)

=== 2021 ===
24 March 2022 FIFA World Cup qualification	Latvia	1–2	Montenegro	Riga, Latvia
20:45	J. Ikaunieks 40'	Report	Jovetić 41', 83'	Stadium: Skonto Stadium; Attendance: 0 Referee: Alain Durieux (Luxembourg)

27 March 2022 FIFA World Cup qualification	Montenegro	4–1	Gibraltar	Podgorica, Montenegro
15:00	Bećiraj 26'; Simić 43'; Tomašević 53'; Jovetić 80'	Report	Styche 30' (pen.)	Stadium: Podgorica City Stadium; Attendance: 0 Referee: Manuel Schüttengruber (Austria)

30 March 2022 FIFA World Cup qualification	Montenegro	0–1	Norway	Podgorica, Montenegro
20:45		Report	Sørloth 35'	Stadium: Podgorica City Stadium; Attendance: 0 Referee: Anthony Taylor (England)

2 June Friendly	Bosnia and Herzegovina	0–0	Montenegro	Sarajevo, Bosnia and Herzegovina
21:00		Report		Stadium: Stadion Grbavica; Attendance: 0 Referee: Novak Simovic (Serbia)

5 June Friendly	Montenegro	1–3	Israel	Podgorica, Montenegro
20:45	Bećiraj 81' (pen.)	Report; Report (UEFA)	Zahavi 67'; Solomon 69'; Kinda 90+1'	Stadium: Podgorica City Stadium; Attendance: 860; Referee: Irfan Peljto (Bosnia and Herzegovina)

1 September 2022 FIFA World Cup qualification	Turkey	2–2	Montenegro	Istanbul, Turkey
21:45	Ünder 9'; Yazıcı 31'	Report	Marušić 40'; Radunović 90+7'	Stadium: Vodafone Park; Attendance: 12,472; Referee: Benoît Bastien (France)

4 September 2022 FIFA World Cup qualification	Netherlands	4–0	Montenegro	Eindhoven, Netherlands
20:45	Depay 38' (pen.), 62'; Wijnaldum 70'; Gakpo 76'	Report		Stadium: Philips Stadion; Attendance: 20,458; Referee: Jesús Gil Manzano (Spain)

7 September 2022 FIFA World Cup qualification	Montenegro	0–0	Latvia	Podgorica, Montenegro
20:45		Report		Stadium: Podgorica City Stadium; Attendance: 2,134; Referee: Harm Osmers (Germany)

8 October 2022 FIFA World Cup qualification	Gibraltar	0–3	Montenegro	Gibraltar
20:45		Report	Marušić 7'; Bećiraj 44' (pen.), 68'	Stadium: Victoria Stadium; Attendance: 1,351; Referee: Filip Glova (Slovakia)

11 October 2022 FIFA World Cup qualification	Norway	2–0	Montenegro	Oslo, Norway
20:45	Elyounoussi 29', 90+6'	Report		Stadium: Ullevaal Stadion; Attendance: 23,748; Referee: István Kovács (Romania)

13 November 2022 FIFA World Cup qualification	Montenegro	2–2	Netherlands	Podgorica, Montenegro
20:45	Vukotić 82'; Vujnović 86'	Report	Depay 25' (pen.), 54'	Stadium: Podgorica City Stadium; Attendance: 1,844; Referee: Carlos del Cerro Grande (Spain)

16 November 2022 FIFA World Cup qualification	Montenegro	1–2	Turkey	Podgorica, Montenegro
20:45	Bećiraj 4'	Report	Aktürkoğlu 22'; Kökçü 60'	Stadium: Podgorica City Stadium; Attendance: 2,885; Referee: Daniel Siebert (Germany)

=== 2022 ===
24 March Friendly	Armenia	1–0	Montenegro	Yerevan, Armenia
17:00	Bichakhchyan 19'	Report		Stadium: Vazgen Sargsyan Republican Stadium; Attendance: 4,000; Referee: Andris Treimanis (Latvia)

28 March Friendly	Montenegro	1–0	Greece	Podgorica, Montenegro
20:00	Osmajić 59'	Report		Stadium: Podgorica City Stadium; Attendance: 3,425; Referee: Fran Jovic (Croatia)

4 June 2022–23 UEFA Nations League B	Montenegro	2–0	Romania	Podgorica, Montenegro
20:45	Mugoša 66'; Vukčević 87'	Report		Stadium: Podgorica City Stadium; Attendance: 3,998; Referee: Andreas Ekberg (Sweden)

7 June 2022–23 UEFA Nations League B	Finland	2–0	Montenegro	Helsinki, Finland
21:45	Pohjanpalo 31', 38'	Report		Stadium: Helsinki Olympic Stadium; Attendance: 17,009; Referee: Allard Lindhout (Netherlands)

11 June 2022–23 UEFA Nations League B	Montenegro	1–1	Bosnia and Herzegovina	Podgorica, Montenegro
20:45	Marušić 77'	Report	Menalo 62'	Stadium: Podgorica City Stadium; Attendance: 6,555; Referee: Daniele Orsato (Italy)

14 June 2022–23 UEFA Nations League B	Romania	0–3	Montenegro	Bucharest, Romania
21:45		Report	Mugoša 42', 56', 63'	Stadium: Stadionul Steaua; Attendance: 11,657; Referee: João Pinheiro (Portugal)

23 September 2022–23 UEFA Nations League B	Bosnia and Herzegovina	1–0	Montenegro	Zenica, Bosnia and Herzegovina
20:45	Demirović 45+1'	Report		Stadium: Bilino Polje Stadium; Attendance: 12,050; Referee: Szymon Marciniak (Poland)

26 September 2022–23 UEFA Nations League B	Montenegro	0–2	Finland	Podgorica, Montenegro
20:45		Report	Antman 47'; Källman 53'	Stadium: City Stadium; Attendance: 2,522; Referee: François Letexier (France)

17 November Friendly	Montenegro	2–2	Slovakia	Podgorica, Montenegro
18:00	Savić 76', 90+7' (pen.)	Report	Hancko 15'; Kucka 47'	Stadium: Podgorica City Stadium; Attendance: 1,109; Referee: Irfan Peljto (Bosnia and Herzegovina)

20 November Friendly	Slovenia	1–0	Montenegro	Ljubljana, Slovenia
15:00	Zajc 42'	Report		Stadium: Stožice Stadium; Attendance: 11,165; Referee: Christopher Jäger (Austria)

=== 2023 ===
24 March UEFA Euro 2024 qualifying	Bulgaria	0–1	Montenegro	Razgrad, Bulgaria
21:45 UTC+2		Report	Krstović 70'	Stadium: Huvepharma Arena; Attendance: 9,234; Referee: Aliyar Aghayev (Azerbaijan)

27 March UEFA Euro 2024 qualifying	Montenegro	0–2	Serbia	Podgorica, Montenegro
20:45 UTC+1		Report	Vlahović 78', 90+6'	Stadium: Podgorica City Stadium; Attendance: 9,831; Referee: Clément Turpin (France)

17 June UEFA Euro 2024 qualifying	Montenegro	0–0	Hungary	Podgorica, Montenegro
18:00 UTC+2		Report		Stadium: Podgorica City Stadium; Attendance: 6,761; Referee: Jesús Gil Manzano (Spain)

20 June Friendly	Montenegro	1–4	Czech Republic	Podgorica, Montenegro
20:45 UTC+2	Camaj 66'	Report	Chytil 28'; M. Sadílek 57'; Provod 75'; Hložek 85'	Stadium: Podgorica City Stadium; Attendance: 1,792; Referee: Matthew De Gabriele (Malta)

7 September UEFA Euro 2024 qualifying	Lithuania	2–2	Montenegro	Kaunas, Lithuania
21:45 UTC+3	Paulauskas 71'; Černych 90+4'	Report	Krstović 78'; Savić 89'	Stadium: Darius and Girėnas Stadium; Attendance: 11,328; Referee: Mohammed Al-Hakim (Sweden)

10 September UEFA Euro 2024 qualifying	Montenegro	2–1	Bulgaria	Podgorica, Montenegro
18:00 UTC+2	Savić 45+1'; Jovetić 90+6'	Report	Borukov 79'	Stadium: Podgorica City Stadium; Attendance: 4,232; Referee: Harm Osmers (Germany)

12 October Friendly	Montenegro	3–2	Lebanon	Podgorica, Montenegro
18:00 UTC+2	Kuč 16', 19'; Osmajić 69'	Report	Darwich 65'; Tneich 80'	Stadium: Podgorica City Stadium; Attendance: 1,337; Referee: Eldorjan Hamiti (Albania)

17 October UEFA Euro 2024 qualifying	Serbia	3–1	Montenegro	Belgrade, Serbia
20:45 UTC+2	Mitrović 9', 73'; Tadić 77'	Report	Jovetić 36'	Stadium: Rajko Mitić Stadium; Attendance: 25,884; Referee: Szymon Marciniak (Poland)

16 November UEFA Euro 2024 qualifying	Montenegro	2–0	Lithuania	Podgorica, Montenegro
18:00 UTC+1	Kuč 3'; Jovetić 48'	Report		Stadium: Podgorica City Stadium; Attendance: 3,647; Referee: Artur Soares Dias (Portugal)

19 November UEFA Euro 2024 qualifying	Hungary	3–1	Montenegro	Budapest, Hungary
15:00 UTC+1	Szoboszlai 66', 68'; Á. Nagy 90+3'	Report	Rubežić 36'	Stadium: Puskás Aréna; Attendance: 59,600; Referee: Danny Makkelie (Netherlands)

=== 2024 ===
21 March Friendly	Montenegro	2–0	Belarus	Antalya, Turkey
20:00 UTC+3	Marušić 27'; Krstović 45'	Report		Stadium: Mardan Sports Complex; Attendance: 100; Referee: Kadir Sağlam (Turkey)

25 March Friendly	Montenegro	1–0	North Macedonia	Antalya, Turkey
20:00 UTC+3	Jovetić 45'	Report		Stadium: Mardan Sports Complex; Attendance: 250; Referee: Zorbay Küçük (Turkey)

5 June Friendly	Belgium	2–0	Montenegro	Brussels, Belgium
20:30 UTC+2	De Bruyne 44'; Trossard 90+3' (pen.)	Report	Brnović (yellow card) 63' (yellow-red card) 88'	Stadium: King Baudouin Stadium; Attendance: 19,246; Referee: Kristoffer Karlsson (Sweden)

9 June Friendly	Montenegro	1–3	Georgia	Podgorica, Montenegro
20:45 UTC+2	Jovetić 66'	Report	Kiteishvili 10'; Mikautadze 33'; Zivzivadze 83'	Stadium: Podgorica City Stadium; Attendance: 5,000; Referee: Aleksandar Stavrev (North Macedonia)

6 September 2024–25 UEFA Nations League B	Iceland	2–0	Montenegro	Reykjavík, Iceland
18:45 UTC+0	Óskarsson 39'; Þorsteinsson 58'	Report		Stadium: Laugardalsvöllur; Attendance: 4,683; Referee: Willy Delajod (France)

9 September 2024–25 UEFA Nations League B	Montenegro	1–2	Wales	Nikšić, Montenegro
19:45 UTC+0	Camaj 73'	Report	Moore 1'; Wilson 3'	Stadium: Stadion kraj Bistrice; Attendance: 3,569; Referee: Georgi Kabakov (Bulgaria)
Note: First home game outside Podgorica City Stadium, first game at Nikšić City Stadium.

11 October 2024–25 UEFA Nations League B	Turkey	1–0	Montenegro	Samsun, Turkey
21:45 UTC+3	Kahveci 69'	Report		Stadium: Samsun 19 Mayıs Stadium; Attendance: 28,829; Referee: Daniele Chiffi (Italy)

14 October 2024–25 UEFA Nations League B	Wales	1–0	Montenegro	Cardiff, Wales
19:45 UTC+0	Wilson 36' (pen.)	Report		Stadium: Cardiff City Stadium; Attendance: 27,326; Referee: Filip Glova (Slovakia)

16 November 2024–25 UEFA Nations League B	Montenegro	0–2	Iceland	Nikšić, Montenegro
18:00 UTC+1		Report	Óskarsson 74'; Jóhannesson 88'	Stadium: Gradski stadion (Nikšić); Attendance: 2,354; Referee: Sven Jablonski (Germany)

19 November 2024–25 UEFA Nations League B	Montenegro	3–1	Turkey	Nikšić, Montenegro
20:45 UTC+1	Krstović 29', 45', 73'	Report	Yıldız 37'	Stadium: Gradski stadion (Nikšić); Attendance: 2,579; Referee: Urs Schnyder (Switzerland)

=== 2025 ===
22 March 2026 FIFA World Cup qualification	Montenegro	3–1	Gibraltar	Nikšić, Montenegro
18:00 UTC+1	Jovetić 22'; Tući 70'; Marušić 73'	Report	Bent 13'	Stadium: Gradski stadion Attendance: 3,021; Referee: António Nobre (Portugal)

25 March 2026 FIFA World Cup qualification	Montenegro	1–0	Faroe Islands	Nikšić, Montenegro
20:45 UTC+1	Kuč 90+6'	Report		Stadium: Gradski stadion Attendance: 3,226; Referee: Allard Lindhout (Netherlands)

6 June 2026 FIFA World Cup qualification	Czech Republic	2–0	Montenegro	Plzeň, Czech Republic
20:45 UTC+2	Hložek 23'; Schick 65'	Report		Stadium: Stadion města Plzně; Attendance: 10,889; Referee: Serdar Gözübüyük (Netherlands)

9 June Friendly	Montenegro	2–2	Armenia	Nikšić, Montenegro
20:00 UTC+2	Adžić 5'; Bulatović 52'	Report	Spertsyan 1', 81'	Stadium: Gradski stadion Attendance: 1,398; Referee: Jasmin Šabotić (Luxembourg)

5 September 2026 FIFA World Cup qualification	Montenegro	0–2	Czech Republic	Podgorica, Montenegro
20:45 UTC+2		Report	Červ 3'; Černý 90+6'	Stadium: Podgorica City Stadium; Attendance: 6,315; Referee: Marco Guida (Italy)

8 September 2026 FIFA World Cup qualification	Croatia	4–0	Montenegro	Zagreb, Croatia
20:45 UTC+2	Jakić 35'; Kramarić 51'; Kuč 85' (o.g.); Perišić 90+2'	Report		Stadium: Stadion Maksimir; Attendance: 21,209; Referee: Felix Zwayer (Germany)

9 October 2026 FIFA World Cup qualification	Faroe Islands	4–0	Montenegro	Tórshavn, Faroe Islands
19:45 UTC+1	Sørensen 16', 55'; Roganović 36' (o.g.); Frederiksberg 72' (pen.)	Report		Stadium: Tórsvøllur; Attendance: 2,034; Referee: Javier Alberola Rojas (Spain)

13 October Friendly	Montenegro	2–1	Liechtenstein	Podgorica, Montenegro
18:00 UTC+2	Osmajić 74'; Đukanović 88'	Report	Sele 27'	Stadium: Podgorica City Stadium; Attendance: 1,732; Referee: Igor Stojchevski (North Macedonia)

14 November 2026 FIFA World Cup qualification	Gibraltar	1–2	Montenegro	Europa Point, Gibraltar
20:45 UTC+1	Jessop 20'	Report	Adžić 33'; Krstović 42' (pen.)	Stadium: Europa Sports Park; Attendance: 668; Referee: Anastasios Papapetrou (Greece)

17 November 2026 FIFA World Cup qualification	Montenegro	2–3	Croatia	Podgorica, Montenegro
20:45 UTC+1	Osmajić 3'; Krstović 17'	Report	Perišić 37' (pen.); Jakić 72'; Vlašić 87'	Stadium: Podgorica City Stadium; Attendance: 4,673; Referee: Halil Umut Meler (Turkey)

=== 2026 ===
27 March Friendly	Montenegro	2–0	Andorra	Podgorica, Montenegro
18:00 UTC+1	Mugoša 41' (pen.); Osmajić 80'	Report		Stadium: Podgorica City Stadium; Attendance: 1,855; Referee: Enea Jorgji (Albania)

31 March Friendly	Montenegro	2–3	Slovenia	Podgorica, Montenegro
18:00 UTC+2	Osmajić 20', 44'	Report	Vipotnik 41', 55'; Šturm 47'	Stadium: Podgorica City Stadium; Attendance: 3,000; Referee: Duje Strukan (Croatia)

1 June Friendly	Bulgaria	0–1	Montenegro	Plovdiv, Bulgaria
19:00 UTC+3		Report	Sekulić 68'	Stadium: Stadion Hristo Botev; Attendance: 2,323; Referee: Ioannis Papadopoulos (Greece)

5 June Friendly	Slovakia	2–2	Montenegro	Košice, Slovakia
18:30 UTC+2	Boženík 6'; Duda 74'	Report	Osmajić 44', 66' (pen.)	Stadium: Košická futbalová aréna Attendance: 10,432; Referee: Wojciech Myć (Poland)

25 September 2026–27 UEFA Nations League C	Montenegro	2–1	Cyprus	Podgorica, Montenegro
20:45 UTC+2	Krstović 66' (pen.); Osmajić 86'	Report	Edwards 55'	Stadium: Podgorica City Stadium; Attendance: 6,726; Referee: Daniele Chiffi (Italy)

28 September 2026–27 UEFA Nations League C	Armenia	2–3	Montenegro	Yerevan, Armenia
20:00 UTC+4	Serobyan 34'; Spertsyan 65'	Report	Piloyan 20' (o.g.); Krstović 38'; Latković 89'	Stadium: Vazgen Sargsyan Republican Stadium; Attendance: 11,400; Referee: José Luis Munuera Montero (Spain)

2 October 2026–27 UEFA Nations League C	Latvia	1–2	Montenegro	Riga, Latvia
20:45 UTC+2	Strods 82'	Report	Adzic 3', 56'	Stadium: Skonto Stadium; Attendance: 6,149; Referee: Radoslav Gidzhenov (Bulgaria)

5 October 2026–27 UEFA Nations League C	Montenegro	0–0	Armenia	Podgorica, Montenegro
20:45 UTC+2		Report		Stadium: Podgorica City Stadium; Attendance: 9,700; Referee: Manfredas Lukjančukas (Lithuania)

12 November 2026–27 UEFA Nations League C	Montenegro	2–1	Latvia	Podgorica, Montenegro
20:45 UTC+2	Krstović 70'; Maraš 90+1'	Report	Meļņiks 72'	Stadium: Podgorica City Stadium; Attendance: 5,799; Referee: Jérôme Brisard (France)

15 November 2026–27 UEFA Nations League C	Cyprus	1–4	Montenegro	Limassol, Cyprus
16:00 UTC+2	Pittas 52' (pen.)	Report	Osmajić 5'; Vukotić 58'; Krstović 67', 83'	Stadium: Alphamega Stadium; Attendance: 5,695; Referee: Sander van der Eijk (Netherlands)

== Montenegro versus other countries ==
Below is a summary of Montenegrin national team results against every opponent country.

As of 16 November 2026

Opponent	P	W	D	L	GF	GA	GD	Win %
Albania	2	0	0	2	2	4	−2	0.00
Armenia	6	2	2	2	11	9	+2	33.33
Andorra	1	1	0	0	2	0	+2	100.00
Austria	2	0	0	2	2	4	−2	0.00
Azerbaijan	3	2	1	0	4	0	+4	66.67
Belarus	5	3	2	0	6	1	+5	60.00
Belgium	2	0	1	1	2	4	−2	0.00
Bosnia and Herzegovina	4	0	3	1	1	2	−1	0.00
Bulgaria	9	4	4	1	10	9	+1	44.44
Colombia	1	0	0	1	0	1	−1	0.00
Croatia	2	0	0	2	2	7	−5	0.00
Cyprus	7	4	3	0	15	5	+10	57.14
Czech Republic	7	0	0	7	1	17	−16	0.00
Denmark	3	1	0	2	2	3	−1	33.33
England	6	0	3	3	5	19	−14	0.00
Estonia	1	1	0	0	1	0	+1	100.00
Faroe Islands	2	1	0	1	1	4	−3	50.00
Finland	2	0	0	2	0	4	−4	0.00
Georgia	3	1	1	1	3	4	−1	33.33
Ghana	1	1	0	0	1	0	+1	100.00
Gibraltar	4	4	0	0	12	3	+9	100.00
Greece	2	1	0	1	2	2	+0	50.00
Hungary	5	2	2	1	8	8	+0	40.00
Iceland	3	1	0	2	2	5	−3	33.33
Israel	1	0	0	1	1	3	−2	0.00
Iran	2	0	1	1	1	2	−1	0.00
Italy	2	0	0	2	1	4	−3	0.00
Japan	1	0	0	1	0	2	−2	0.00
Kazakhstan	4	3	1	0	11	0	+11	75.00
Kosovo	2	0	1	1	1	3	−2	0.00
Latvia	6	4	2	0	9	4	+5	66.67
Lebanon	1	1	0	0	3	2	+1	100.00
Liechtenstein	3	2	1	0	4	1	+3	66.67
Lithuania	4	3	1	0	10	3	+7	75.00
Luxembourg	3	2	0	1	6	3	+3	66.67
Moldova	4	3	0	1	7	5	+2	75.00
North Macedonia	4	2	0	2	5	7	−2	50.00
Netherlands	2	0	1	1	2	6	−4	0.00
Northern Ireland	1	1	0	0	2	0	+2	100.00
Norway	4	1	0	3	4	6	−2	25.00
Poland	4	0	2	2	6	9	−3	0.00
Republic of Ireland	2	0	2	0	0	0	+0	0.00
Romania	7	3	2	2	7	6	+1	42.86
Russia	2	0	0	2	0	5	−5	0.00
San Marino	2	2	0	0	9	0	+9	100.00
Serbia	4	0	0	4	2	9	−7	0.00
Slovakia	3	0	2	1	4	6	−2	0.00
Slovenia	4	0	1	3	3	7	−4	0.00
Sweden	3	0	1	2	3	6	−3	0.00
Switzerland	2	1	0	1	1	2	−1	50.00
Turkey	6	1	2	3	8	9	−1	16.67
Ukraine	2	1	0	1	1	4	−3	50.00
Uzbekistan	1	1	0	0	1	0	+1	100.00
Wales	5	2	0	3	5	6	−1	40.00
54 Teams	174	62	42	70	212	235	−23	35.63

== See also ==
- Montenegro national football team
- Montenegro national football team records and statistics
- Sport in Montenegro
