= List of Montenegro international footballers =

This is a list of all football players that have played for national team of Montenegro.

Ordered alphabetically, followed by number of appearances and goals.

Updated 29 December 2013.

== Players ==
=== B ===
- Marko Bakić (2/0) [Mogren, Torino (ITA), Fiorentina (ITA)]
- Saša Balić (4/0) [OFK Beograd (SRB), Grbalj, Inter Zaprešić (CRO), Kryvbas (UKR)]
- Marko Baša (26/2) [PP Trstenik (SRB), OFK Beograde (SRB), Proleter Z. (SRB), OFK Belgrade (SRB), Le Mans (FRA), Lokomotiv Moscow (RUS), Lille (FRA)]
- Radoslav Batak (25/1) [ČSK Pivara (SRB), Mladost Apatin (SRB), Vojvodina (SRB), Vrbas (SRB), Vojvodina (SRB), Dinamo Moscow (RUS), Ankaraspor (TUR), Antalyaspor (TUR), Mogren, Tobol (KAZ), retired]
- Fatos Bećiraj (25/3) [Besa Peje (SRB/KOS), Budućnost P., Dinamo Zagreb (CRO)]
- Srđan Blažić (2/0) [Zeta, Budućnost P., Mornar, Kom, Zora, Rudar Pljevlja, Levadiakos (GRE), Standard Liège (BEL), Panetolikos (GRE), Anorthosis (CYP), Nea Salamina (CYP)]
- Dragan Bogavac (7/0) [Brskovo, Rudar Pljevlja, Red Star (SRB), Wacker Burghausen (GER), TuS Koblenz (GER), Paderborn 07 (GER), Mainz 05 (GER), FC Astana (KAZ), OFK Beograd (SRB)]
- Aleksandar Boljević (1/0) [Zeta, PSV Eindhoven (NED)]
- Branko Bošković (27/1) [Mogren, Red Star (SRB), PSG (FRA), Troyes (FRA), Rapid Wien (AUT), DC United (USA), Rapid Wien (AUT)]
- Darko Božović (2/0) [Teleoptik (SRB), Srem SM (SRB), Mladenovac (SRB), Timok Z. (SRB), Srem SM (SRB), Bežanija (SRB), Partizan (SRB), Sloboda Užice (SRB), Zob Ahan (IRN), Bežanija (SRB), Happy Valley (HKO)]
- Draško Božović (3/0) [Budućnost P., Mogren, Budućnost P., Hapoel Be'er Sheva (ISR), Mladost Podgorica, Domžale (SVN)]
- Mladen Božović (33/0) [Zabjelo, Budućnost P., Mladost P., Kom, Budućnost P., Partizan (SRB), Videoton (HUN), Tom Tomsk (RUS)]
- Vladimir Božović (36/0) [Zastava (SRB), OFK Belgrade (SRB), Proleter Z. (SRB), Kom, OFK Belgrade (SRB), Rapid Bucharest (ROM), Mordovia (RUS)]
- Igor Burzanović (8/2) [Budućnost P., Red Star (SRB), Budućnost P., Nagoya GE (JPN), Buriram Utd. (THY)]

=== Ć ===
- Đorđije Ćetković (3/0) [Crvena Stijena, Budućnost BD (SRB), Čukarički (SRB), Železnik (SRB), Voždovac (SRB), Hansa Rostock (GER), Osnabrück (GER), Budućnost P., H. Bnei Sakhnin (ISR), Györi ETO (HUN), Zeta, Kastrioti Kruje (ALB), Buriram Utd. (THY), Sutjeska]
- Marko Ćetković (6/1) [Crvena Stijena, Zeta, Partizan (SRB), Zeta, Mogren, Jagiellonia B. (POL), Buriram Utd. (THY), Podbeskidzie (POL), Budućnost P.]

=== D ===
- Dejan Damjanović (22/6) [Sinđelić B. (SRB), Železnik (SRB), Lasta (SRB), Srem SM (SRB), Bežanija (SRB), Radnički NB (SRB), Al-Ahli Jeddah (KSA), Incheon Utd. (KOR), FC Seoul (KOR)]
- Andrija Delibašić (21/6) [Partizan (SRB), Mallorca (ESP), Benfica (POR), SC Braga (POR), AEK Athens (GRE), Beira-Mar (POR), R.Sociedad (ESP), Hércules (ESP), Rayo Vallecano (ESP)]
- Ivan Delić (2/0) [Mladost P., Budućnost P., Mladá Boleslav (CZE), Zalaegerszeg (HUN), Vllaznia (ALB), Grbalj]
- Nikola Drinčić (32/3) [Teleoptik (SRB), Partizan (SRB), Spartak S. (SRB), Budućnost BD (SRB), Gaziantepspor (TUR), Amkar Perm (RUS), Spartak Moscow (RUS), Krasnodar (RUS), Partizan (SRB)]

=== Dž ===
- Miodrag Džudović (25/1) [Jezero Plav, Jedinstvo BP, OFK Belgrade (SRB), Volyn Lutsk (UKR), Spartak Nalchik (RUS)]

=== Đ ===
- Radomir Đalović (26/7) [Jedinstvo BP, Red Star (SRB), Železnik (SRB), NK Zagreb (CRO), A.Bielefeld (GER), Erciyesspor (TUR), Rijeka (CRO), Rapid Bucharest (ROM), Rijeka (CRO), Amkar Perm (RUS), Sepahan (IRN)]
- Luka Đorđević (2/0) [Mogren, Zenit (RUS), Twente (NED)]

=== F ===
- Ivan Fatić (6/0) [Inter (ITA), Vicenza (ITA), Salernitana (ITA), Genoa (ITA), Cesena (ITA), Chievo (ITA), Empoli (ITA), Verona (ITA), Lecce (ITA), Vojvodina (SRB)]

=== G ===
- Vladimir Gluščević (1/0) [Mogren, Sparta Prague (CZE), Budućnost P., Borac Čačak (SRB), Rad (SRB), Poli Timişoara (ROM), Mogren, Albacete (ESP), Mogren, Hapoel Haifa (ISR)]
- Petar Grbić (3/0) [Mladost P., Mogren, Levadiakos (GRE), Hapoel Be'er Sheva (ISR), OFK Beograd (SRB), Partizan (SRB)]

=== I ===
- Blažo Igumanović (1/0) [Mladost P., Zeta, Rudar Pljevlja, Astana (KAZ)]
- Ivan Ivanović (1/0) [Zora, Jezero Plav, OFK Bar, Čelik Nikšić]
- Marko Ivezaj born 1967 played in Montenegro for first division at 15

=== J ===
- Ivan Janjušević (1/0) [Sutjeska, Mogren, Vasas (HUN), Sutjeska]
- Vlado Jeknić (5/0) [Crvena Stijena, Sutjeska, Wacker Burghausen (GER), Wehen (GER), Diósgyőri VTK (HUN), Beijing Baxi (CHN), Fujian Smart Hero (CHN)]
- Milan Jovanović (35/0) [Borac Čačak (SRB), Mladost L. (SRB), Železnik (SRB), Radnički NB (SRB), Vaslui (ROM), Un.Craiova (ROM), Radnički Niš (SRB), U.Urziceni (ROM), Un.Cluj (ROM), Rapid Wien (AUT), Spartak Nalchik (RUS), Red Star (SRB), Lokomotiv Sofia (BUL)]
- Miroje Jovanović (1/1) [Mladost P., Kom, Rudar Pljevlja]
- Stevan Jovetić (30/12) [Partizan (SRB), Fiorentina (ITA), Manchester City (ENG)]
- Vladimir Jovović (1/0) [Sutjeska]

=== K ===
- Filip Kasalica (10/1) [OFK Belgrade (SRB), J.Paraćin (SRB), Mačva (SRB), Srem (SRB), Hajduk Kula (SRB), Sloboda Užice (SRB), Red Star (SRB)]
- Mladen Kašćelan (18/0) [Bokelj, Bor.Dortmund II (GER), Karlsruher (GER), Bokelj, OFK Belgrade (SRB), Spartak S. (SRB), Voždovac (SRB), ŁKS Łódź (POL), Stal Głowno (POL), ŁKS Łódź (POL), Karpaty Lviv (UKR), Jagiellonia B (POL), ŁKS Łódź (POL), Ludogorets (BUL), Jagiellonia B. (POL), Panthrakikos (GRE), Arsenal Tula (RUS)]
- Ivan Kecojević (5/0) [Mornar, Teleoptik (SRB), Čukarički (SRB), OFK Belgrade (SRB), Gaziantepspor (TUR)]
- Miloš Krkotić (5/0) [Zeta, Dacia Chisinau (MDA)]

=== L ===
- Risto Lakić (7/0) [Budućnost P., Partizan (SRB), Vojvodina (SRB), Mogren, Čukarički (SRB)]
- Slobodan Lakićević (1/0) [B.Leverkusen II (GER), Wehen (GER), Budućnost P., Velež Mostar (BIH), Pécsi MFC (HUN), Čelik Zenica (BIH)]

=== N ===
- Darko Nikač (1/0) [Budućnost P., Mladost P., Budućnost P.]
- Nikola Nikezić (1/0) [Budućnost P., Bokelj, Sutjeska, Domžale (SVN), Gorica (SVN), Le Havre (FRA), Kuban K. (RUS), Olimpija (SVN)]
- Nemanja Nikolić (3/0) [Spartak S. (SRB), Grbalj, Red Star (SRB), Spartak S. (SRB), OFK Beograd (SRB), Dinamo Minsk (BLR)]
- Mitar Novaković (25/0) [Mornar, Zvezdara (SRB), BSK Borča (SRB), Čukarički (SRB), Radnički NB (SRB), Železnik (SRB), Rad (SRB), OFK Belgrade (SRB), Amkar Perm (RUS)]

=== O ===
- Dejan Ognjanović (5/0) [Bokelj, Budućnost P., Partizan (SRB), Estoril (POR), Obilić (SRB), Estoril (POR), ŁKS Łódź (POL), Smederevo (SRB), Kastrioti (ALB), Smederevo (SRB), Sutjeska]

=== P ===
- Savo Pavićević (37/0) [Njegoš L. (SRB), Hajduk Kula (SRB), AIK B.Topola (SRB), Tekstilac (SRB), Njegoš L. (SRB), Hajduk Kula (SRB), Vojvodina (SRB), E.Cottbus (GER), Kavala (GRE), Maccabi TA (ISR), Omonia (CYP), Anorthosis (CYP)]
- Luka Pejović (23/1) [Crvena Stijena, Grbalj, Mogren, Jagiellonia (POL), Mogren]
- Milorad Peković (34/0) [OFK Belgrade (SRB), Partizan (SRB), OFK Belgrade (SRB), E.Trier 05 (GER), Mainz 05 (GER), Greuther Fürth (GER), Hansa Rostock (GER)]
- Rade Petrović (1/0) [Budućnost P., Grbalj, Bokelj, Kom, Jedinstvo BP, Carlstad Utd. (SWE), Borac Čačak (SRB), Terek G. (RUS), Grbalj, retired]
- Vukašin Poleksić (26/0) [Sutjeska, Lecce (ITA), Sutjeska, Tatabánya (HUN), Debreceni VSC (HUN)]
- Milan Purović (7/0) [Budućnost P., Red Star (SRB), Sporting (POR), Kayserispor (TUR), Videoton (HUN), Olimpija (SVN), Belenenses (POR), Cercle Brugg (BEL), OFK Beograd (SRB), Bežanija (SRB)]

=== R ===
- Srđan Radonjić (3/0) [Budućnost P., Mornar, Sutjeska, Partizan (SRB), Odense (DEN), Viborg (DEN), Start K. (NOR), SCR Altach (AUT), Mogren, Luch Energiya (RUS), Grbalj, Budućnost P., Kazma (KUW), Budućnost P., Sutjeska]
- Mirko Raičević (3/0) [Obilić (SRB), Mladi Obilić (SRB), Žitorađa (SRB), Budućnost P., Zorya L. (UKR), Chernomorets O. (UKR), Zakarpattia U. (UKR), Hoverla (UKR)]

=== S ===
- Stefan Savić (25/2) [BSK Borča (SRB), Partizan (SRB), Manchester City (ENG), Fiorentina (ITA)]
- Marko Simić (2/0) [Spartak Varna (BUL), Chernomorets Byala (BUL), Radnički Kragujevac (SRB), Mladenovac (SRB), Honvéd (HUN), Bežanija (SRB), Jagodina (SRB), BATE Borisov (BLR), Kayserispor (TUR)]
- Janko Simović (1/0) [Berane, Metalac GM (SRB), Mogren, Arsenal Kyiv (UKR), Dynamo Kyiv (UKR)]

=== T ===
- Jovan Tanasijević (13/0) [Priština (SRB), Vojvodina (SRB), Dinamo Moscow (RUS), Rostov (RUS), Dinamo Moscow (RUS), Salyut B. (RUS), Inđija (SRB), retired]
- Žarko Tomašević (2/0) [Nacional (POR), União Madeira (POR), Partizan (SRB), Kortrijk (BEL)]
- Janko Tumbasević (4/0) [Zeta, Vojvodina (SRB), Dacia Chisinau (MDA), Zimbru (MDA), Dacia Chisinau (MDA), Vojvodina (SRB)]

=== V ===
- Neđeljko Vlahović (1/0) [Kom, Zora, Kom, Budućnost P., Kom, Rudar Pljevlja]
- Marko Vešović (2/1) [Budućnost P., Red Star (SRB)]
- Vladimir Volkov (11/0) [BSK Borča (SRB), Portimonense (POR), OFK Beograd (SRB), Sheriff (MDA), Partizan (SRB)]
- Mirko Vučinić (37/15) [Sutjeska, Lecce (ITA), Roma (ITA), Juventus (ITA)]
- Nikola Vujović (6/0) [Lovćen, Budućnost P., Akratitos (GRE), Budućnost P., Mogren, Partizan (SRB), Mogren]
- Vladimir Vujović (3/0) [Mogren, FK Beograd (SRB), OFK Petrovac, Sutjeska, Pobeda (MKD), Al-Wehda (KSA), Mogren, Luch-Energiya (RUS), Vasas (HUN), Mogren, Vostok O. (KAZ), Al-Ahed (LEB), Shenyang Shenbei (CHN), OFK Petrovac]
- Nikola Vukčević (1/0) [Budućnost P., Vllaznia (ALB), Budućnost P., Ethnikos Achna (CYP), Kazma (KUW)]
- Simon Vukčević (46/2) [Partizan (SRB), Saturn (RUS), Sporting (POR), Blackburn (ENG), Karpaty Lvyv (UKR), Vojvodina (SRB)]
- Ivan Vuković (1/0) [Zeta, Budućnost P., Hajduk Split (CRO), Seongnam Ilhwa (RKO)]

=== Z ===
- Elsad Zverotić (43/4) [Bazenheid (SWI), Wil 1900 (SWI), Luzern (SWI), Young Boys (SWI), Fulham (ENG)]

== Statistics ==
Updated: 15 February 2011.

=== Most capped Montenegro players ===
#	Name	Career	Caps	Goals
1	Simon Vukčević	2007–	26	1
2	Savo Pavićević	2007–	24	0
=	Milan Jovanović	2007–	24	0
4	Branko Bošković	2007–	22	2
=	Milorad Peković	2007–	22	0
=	Vukašin Poleksić	2007–	22	0
=	Mirko Vučinić	2007–	22	11
=	Vladimir Božović	2007–	22	0
9	Radoslav Batak	2007–	21	1
10	Luka Pejović	2007–	20	1
11	Nikola Drinčić	2007–	19	1

=== Top Montenegro goalscorers ===
#	Player	Career	Goals (Caps)	Goals/Cap
1	Mirko Vučinić	2007–	11 (22)	0.50
2	Radomir Đalović	2007–	7 (21)	0.33
3	Stevan Jovetić	2007–	6 (13)	0.46
4	Dejan Damjanović	2008–	2 (8)	0.25
=	Igor Burzanović	2007–	2 (8)	0.25

=== Montenegro captains ===
#	Player	Montenegro career	Captain (Total Caps)
1	Mirko Vučinić (present captain)	2007–	16 (19)

== External source ==
- Selekcije-Arhiva at Montenegrin FA official website.
- Montenegro at National-football-teams.
