= UEFA Euro 2020 qualifying Group A =

Football tournament

Group A of UEFA Euro 2020 qualifying was one of the ten groups to decide which teams would qualify for the UEFA Euro 2020 finals tournament. Group A consisted of five teams: Bulgaria, Czech Republic, England, Kosovo and Montenegro, where they played against each other home-and-away in a round-robin format.

England finished as group winners, with a single loss to the Czech Republic and seven wins, whilst the Czech Republic finished second with five wins and three losses. Both teams qualified directly for the main draw of UEFA Euro 2020. Unlike previous editions, the participants of the play-offs were not decided based on results from the qualifying group stage, but instead based on their performance in the 2018–19 UEFA Nations League. Due to the COVID-19 pandemic, the finals were delayed to take part in 2021, rather than in 2020.

== Group summary ==
On 14 October 2019, during the Bulgaria v England match, there was racist behaviour from a group of Bulgarian fans. This included Nazi salutes, monkey chants and racist booing. The behaviour was widely condemned by the public and various groups, including the anti-racist football campaign Kick It Out. The next day, Prime Minister of Bulgaria Boyko Borisov called for Bulgarian Football Union president Borislav Mihaylov to resign following the racist incident. Mihaylov resigned a few hours later.

== Standings ==
Pos	Team	Pld	W	D	L	GF	GA	GD	Pts	Qualification	(England)	(Czech Republic)	(Kosovo)	(Bulgaria)	(Montenegro)
1	England	8	7	0	1	37	6	+31	21	Qualify for final tournament	—	5–0	5–3	4–0	7–0
2	Czech Republic	8	5	0	3	13	11	+2	15	Qualify for final tournament	2–1	—	2–1	2–1	3–0
3	Kosovo	8	3	2	3	13	16	−3	11	Advance to play-offs via Nations League	0–4	2–1	—	1–1	2–0
4	Bulgaria	8	1	3	4	6	17	−11	6	Advance to play-offs via Nations League	0–6	1–0	2–3	—	1–1
5	Montenegro	8	0	3	5	3	22	−19	3		1–5	0–3	1–1	0–0	—

Source: UEFA
Rules for classification: Qualification tiebreakers

== Matches ==
The fixtures were released by UEFA the same day as the draw, which was held on 2 December 2018 in Dublin. Times are CET/CEST, (Note: CET (UTC+1) for matches in March and November 2019, and CEST (UTC+2) for all other matches.) as listed by UEFA (local times, if different, are in parentheses).

22 March 2019
18:00 (19:00 UTC+2)

Bulgaria	1–1	Montenegro
Nedelev 82' (pen.)	Report	Mugoša 50'

Vasil Levski National Stadium, Sofia
Attendance: 5,652
Referee: Ruddy Buquet (France)
22 March 2019
20:45 (19:45 UTC+0)

England	5–0	Czech Republic
Sterling 24', 62', 68'; Kane 45+2' (pen.); Kalas 84' (o.g.)	Report

Wembley Stadium, London
Attendance: 82,575
Referee: Artur Soares Dias (Portugal)

25 March 2019
20:45

Kosovo	1–1	Bulgaria
Zeneli 61'	Report	Bozhikov 39'

Fadil Vokrri Stadium, Pristina
Attendance: 12,580
Referee: Gediminas Mažeika (Lithuania)
25 March 2019
20:45

Montenegro	1–5	England
Vešović 17'	Report	Keane 30'; Barkley 39', 59'; Kane 71'; Sterling 81'

City Stadium, Podgorica
Attendance: 8,329
Referee: Aleksei Kulbakov (Belarus)

7 June 2019
20:45

Czech Republic	2–1	Bulgaria
Schick 19', 50'	Report	Isa 3'

Stadion Letná, Prague
Attendance: 13,482
Referee: Tamás Bognár (Hungary)
7 June 2019
20:45

Montenegro	1–1	Kosovo
Mugoša 69'	Report	Rashica 24'

City Stadium, Podgorica
Attendance: 100 (Note: Montenegro were sanctioned by UEFA to play one home match (against Kosovo on 7 June 2019) without spectators for racist behaviour in their home match against England.)
Referee: Daniele Orsato (Italy)

10 June 2019
20:45 (21:45 UTC+3)

Bulgaria	2–3	Kosovo
I. Popov 43'; Dimitrov 55'	Report	Rashica 14'; Muriqi 64'; Rashani 90+3'

Vasil Levski National Stadium, Sofia
Attendance: 4,994
Referee: Mads-Kristoffer Kristoffersen (Denmark)
10 June 2019
20:45

Czech Republic	3–0	Montenegro
Jankto 18'; Kopitović 49' (o.g.); Schick 82' (pen.)	Report

Andrův stadion, Olomouc
Attendance: 11,565
Referee: Vladislav Bezborodov (Russia)

7 September 2019
15:00

Kosovo	2–1	Czech Republic
Muriqi 20'; Vojvoda 67'	Report	Schick 16'

Fadil Vokrri Stadium, Pristina
Attendance: 12,678
Referee: Danny Makkelie (Netherlands)
7 September 2019
18:00 (17:00 UTC+1)

England	4–0	Bulgaria
Kane 24', 50' (pen.), 73' (pen.); Sterling 55'	Report

Wembley Stadium, London
Attendance: 82,605
Referee: Marco Guida (Italy)

10 September 2019
20:45 (19:45 UTC+1)

England	5–3	Kosovo
Sterling 8'; Kane 19'; Vojvoda 38' (o.g.); Sancho 44', 45+1'	Report	V. Berisha 1', 49'; Muriqi 55' (pen.)

St Mary's Stadium, Southampton
Attendance: 30,155
Referee: Felix Zwayer (Germany)
10 September 2019
20:45

Montenegro	0–3	Czech Republic
	Report	Souček 54'; Masopust 58'; Darida 90+4' (pen.)

City Stadium, Podgorica
Attendance: 5,951
Referee: Ali Palabıyık (Turkey)

11 October 2019
20:45

Czech Republic	2–1	England
Brabec 9'; Ondrášek 85'	Report	Kane 5' (pen.)

Sinobo Stadium, Prague
Attendance: 18,651
Referee: Damir Skomina (Slovenia)
11 October 2019
20:45

Montenegro	0–0	Bulgaria
	Report

City Stadium, Podgorica
Attendance: 2,743
Referee: Andreas Ekberg (Sweden)

14 October 2019
20:45 (21:45 UTC+2)

Bulgaria	0–6	England
	Report	Rashford 7'; Barkley 20', 32'; Sterling 45+3', 69'; Kane 85'

Vasil Levski National Stadium, Sofia
Attendance: 17,481
Referee: Ivan Bebek (Croatia)
14 October 2019
20:45

Kosovo	2–0	Montenegro
Rrahmani 10'; Muriqi 35'	Report

Fadil Vokrri Stadium, Pristina
Attendance: 12,600
Referee: Artur Soares Dias (Portugal)

14 November 2019
20:45

Czech Republic	2–1	Kosovo
Král 71'; Čelůstka 79'	Report	Nuhiu 50'

Štruncovy sady Stadion, Plzeň
Attendance: 10,986
Referee: Gianluca Rocchi (Italy)
14 November 2019
20:45 (19:45 UTC+0)

England	7–0	Montenegro
Oxlade-Chamberlain 11'; Kane 19', 24', 37'; Rashford 30'; Šofranac 66' (o.g.); Abraham 84'	Report

Wembley Stadium, London
Attendance: 77,277
Referee: Antonio Mateu Lahoz (Spain)

17 November 2019
18:00 (19:00 UTC+2)

Bulgaria	1–0	Czech Republic
Bozhikov 56'	Report

Vasil Levski National Stadium, Sofia
Attendance: 0 (Note: The Bulgaria v Czech Republic match was played behind closed doors due to a UEFA punishment against Bulgaria for racist behaviour in their home match against England.)
Referee: Sergei Karasev (Russia)
17 November 2019
18:00

Kosovo	0–4	England
	Report	Winks 32'; Kane 79'; Rashford 83'; Mount 90+1'

Fadil Vokrri Stadium, Pristina
Attendance: 12,326
Referee: Paweł Gil (Poland)

== Goalscorers ==
There were 72 goals scored in 20 matches, for an average of 3.6 goals per match.

12 goals

- (England national football team) Harry Kane

8 goals

- (England national football team) Raheem Sterling

4 goals

- (Czech Republic national football team) Patrik Schick
- (England national football team) Ross Barkley
- (Kosovo national football team) Vedat Muriqi

3 goals

- (England national football team) Marcus Rashford

2 goals

- (Bulgaria national football team) Vasil Bozhikov
- (England national football team) Jadon Sancho
- (Kosovo national football team) Valon Berisha
- (Kosovo national football team) Milot Rashica
- (Montenegro national football team) Stefan Mugoša

1 goal

- (Bulgaria national football team) Kristian Dimitrov
- (Bulgaria national football team) Ismail Isa
- (Bulgaria national football team) Todor Nedelev
- (Bulgaria national football team) Ivelin Popov
- (Czech Republic national football team) Jakub Brabec
- (Czech Republic national football team) Ondřej Čelůstka
- (Czech Republic national football team) Vladimír Darida
- (Czech Republic national football team) Jakub Jankto
- (Czech Republic national football team) Alex Král
- (Czech Republic national football team) Lukáš Masopust
- (Czech Republic national football team) Zdeněk Ondrášek
- (Czech Republic national football team) Tomáš Souček
- (England national football team) Tammy Abraham
- (England national football team) Michael Keane
- (England national football team) Mason Mount
- (England national football team) Alex Oxlade-Chamberlain
- (England national football team) Harry Winks
- (Kosovo national football team) Atdhe Nuhiu
- (Kosovo national football team) Elba Rashani
- (Kosovo national football team) Amir Rrahmani
- (Kosovo national football team) Mërgim Vojvoda
- (Kosovo national football team) Arbër Zeneli
- (Montenegro national football team) Marko Vešović

1 own goal

- (Czech Republic national football team) Tomáš Kalas (against England)
- (Kosovo national football team) Mërgim Vojvoda (against England)
- (Montenegro national football team) Boris Kopitović (against Czech Republic)
- (Montenegro national football team) Aleksandar Šofranac (against England)

== Discipline ==
A player was automatically suspended for the next match for the following offences:

- Receiving a red card (red card suspensions could be extended for serious offences)
- Receiving three yellow cards in three different matches, as well as after fifth and any subsequent yellow card (yellow card suspensions were not carried forward to the play-offs, the finals or any other future international matches)

The following suspensions were served during the qualifying matches:

Team	Player	Offence(s)	Suspended for match(es)
England	Jordan Henderson	(yellow card) vs Montenegro (25 March 2019); (yellow card) vs Czech Republic (11 October 2019); (yellow card) vs Bulgaria (14 October 2019)	vs Montenegro (14 November 2019)
England	Danny Rose	(yellow card) vs Montenegro (25 March 2019); (yellow card) vs Bulgaria (7 September 2019); (yellow card) vs Czech Republic (11 October 2019)	vs Bulgaria (14 October 2019)
Kosovo	Besar Halimi	(yellow card) vs Bulgaria (25 March 2019); (yellow card) vs Bulgaria (10 June 2019); (yellow card) vs England (10 September 2019)	vs Montenegro (14 October 2019)
