= Miloš Brnović =

Montenegrin footballer

Personal information
- Date of birth: 26 April 2000 (age 26)
- Place of birth: Cetinje, FR Yugoslavia
- Height: 1.82 m (6 ft 0 in)
- Position: Central midfielder

Team information
- Current team: FC Arsenal Tula
- Number: 14

Youth career
- Budućnost Podgorica

Senior career*
Years	Team	Apps	(Gls)
2018–2019	Budućnost Podgorica	1	(0)
2019–2021	Titograd	61	(5)
2021–2023	Radnički 1923	35	(1)
2023	Petrovac	15	(1)
2023–2025	Budućnost Podgorica	48	(3)
2025–	FC Arsenal Tula	38	(4)

International career^{‡}
2016–2017	Montenegro U17	5	(0)
2017–2018	Montenegro U19	6	(0)
2020–2022	Montenegro U21	9	(0)
2024–	Montenegro	20	(0)
- * Club domestic league appearances and goals as of 16 May 2026 ‡ National team caps and goals as of 15 November 2026

Miloš Brnović (Montenegrin: Милош Брновић; born 26 April 2000) is a Montenegrin football player who plays as a central midfielder for Russian club FC Arsenal Tula and the Montenegro national team.

== International career ==
Brnović debuted for the Montenegrin senior team on 25 March 2024 in a friendly match against North Macedonia.

== Career statistics ==
As of 16 May 2026

Club	Season	League			Cup		Continental		Other		Total	
Club	Season	Division	Apps	Goals	Apps	Goals	Apps	Goals	Apps	Goals	Apps	Goals
Budućnost Podgorica	2017–18	Montenegrin First League	1	0	—		—		—		1	0
Budućnost Podgorica	2018–19	Montenegrin First League	0	0	—		—		—		0	0
Budućnost Podgorica	Total		1	0	0	0	0	0	0	0	1	0
Titograd	2018–19	Montenegrin First League	9	1	—		—		—		9	1
Titograd	2019–20	Montenegrin First League	23	1	3	0	2 (Note: Appearances in the UEFA Europa League)	0	2 (Note: Appearances in relegation play-offs)	0	30	1
Titograd	2020–21	Montenegrin First League	29	3	1	0	—		—		30	3
Titograd	Total		61	5	4	0	2	0	2	0	69	5
Radnički 1923	2021–22	Serbian SuperLiga	23	1	0	0	—		2	0	25	1
Radnički 1923	2022–23	Serbian SuperLiga	12	0	1	0	—		—		13	0
Radnički 1923	Total		35	1	1	0	0	0	2	0	38	1
Petrovac	2022–23	Montenegrin First League	15	1	—		—		—		15	1
Budućnost Podgorica	2023–24	Montenegrin First League	33	3	3	0	4 (Note: Two appearances in the UEFA Champions League, two appearances in the UEFA Conference League)	0	—		40	3
Budućnost Podgorica	2024–25	Montenegrin First League	15	0	0	0	4 (Note: Appearances in the UEFA Conference League)	0	—		19	0
Budućnost Podgorica	Total		48	3	3	0	8	0	0	0	59	3
Arsenal Tula	2024–25	Russian First League	12	0	—		—		—		12	0
Arsenal Tula	2025–26	Russian First League	26	4	3	0	—		—		29	4
Arsenal Tula	Total		38	4	3	0	0	0	0	0	41	4
Career total			198	14	11	0	10	0	4	0	223	14
