= Boris Kopitović =

Montenegrin footballer (born 1994)

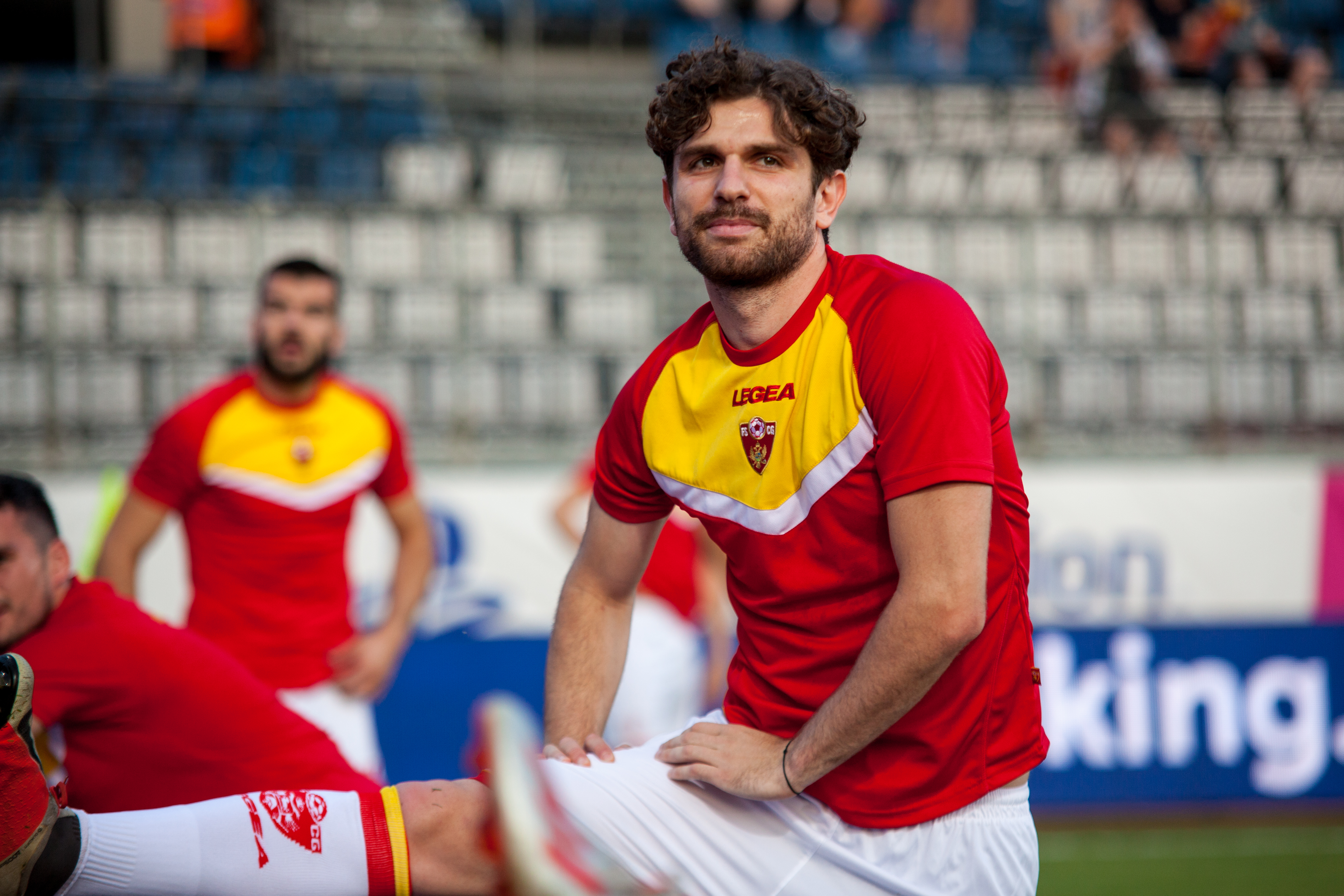
- Kopitović warming up with Montenegro in 2019

Personal information
- Full name: Boris Kopitović
- Date of birth: 17 September 1994 (age 32)
- Place of birth: Podgorica, FR Yugoslavia
- Height: 1.85 m (6 ft 1 in)
- Position: Center-back

Team information
- Current team: Sutjeska Nikšić
- Number: 15

Senior career*
Years	Team	Apps	(Gls)
2011–2015	Budućnost Podgorica	61	(1)
2012	→ Zabjelo (loan)		
2015–2016	Hapoel Acre	31	(3)
2016	Mladost Podgorica	14	(1)
2017–2019	Čukarički	63	(6)
2019–2021	BATE Borisov	25	(0)
2021–2022	Vojvodina	14	(0)
2022–2024	Javor Ivanjica	42	(1)
2025–	Sutjeska Nikšić	44	(4)

International career
2010	Montenegro U17	3	(0)
2011–2012	Montenegro U19	9	(1)
2015–2016	Montenegro U21	10	(0)
2018–2019	Montenegro	8	(1)
- * Club domestic league appearances and goals as of 17 June 2026

Boris Kopitović (Montenegrin Cyrillic: Борис Копитовић; born 17 September 1994) is a Montenegrin professional footballer who plays as a defender who plays for Sutjeska Nikšić.

== Club career ==
=== Early career ===
Born in Podgorica, Montenegro, FR Yugoslavia, Kopitović played for Zabjelo, Budućnost, Israeli club Hapoel Acre, and Mladost Podgorica before coming to Serbia during winter break of 2016–17 season to join Čukarički.

=== Čukarički ===
In December 2016, Kopitović signed a three-year contract with Čukarički. Over the course of two full seasons and half of a third, he played a total of 69 games for Čukarički, scoring a total of six goals.

=== BATE Borisov ===
In August 2019, Kopitović signed a 3.5-year contract with BATE Borisov in a €300,000 transfer from Čukarički.

=== Vojvodina ===
On 26 August 2021, Kopitović signed a 3-year contract with Serbian SuperLiga club Vojvodina.

== International career ==
Kopitović represented Montenegro in U17, U19, U21, before debuting for Montenegro national team in a June 2018 friendly match against Slovenia.

=== International goals ===
Scores and results list Montenegro's goal tally first.

No.	Date	Venue	Opponent	Score	Result	Competition
1.	14 October 2018	LFF Stadium, Vilnius, Lithuania	Lithuania	2–0	4–1	2018–19 UEFA Nations League C
