= Miroje Jovanović =

Retired Montenegrin footballer (born 1987)

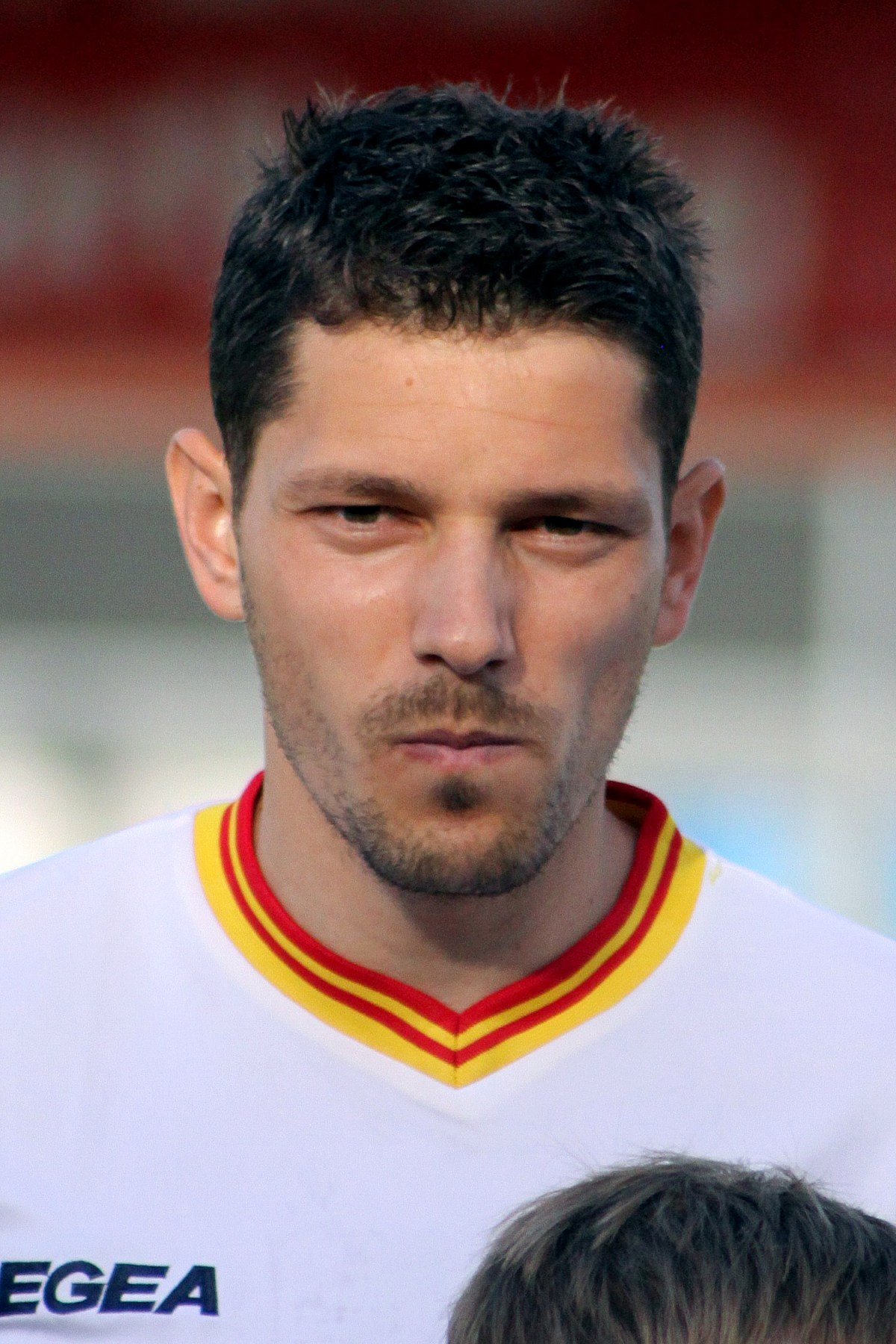
- Jovanović in 2014

Personal information
- Full name: Miroje Jovanović
- Date of birth: 10 March 1987 (age 39)
- Place of birth: Titograd, SFR Yugoslavia (modern-day Podgorica, Montenegro)
- Height: 1.87 m (6 ft 1 1/2 in)
- Position: Midfielder

Senior career*
Years	Team	Apps	(Gls)
2006–2007	Mladost Podgorica	26	(0)
2007–2009	Kom	52	(9)
2009–2014	Rudar Pljevlja	138	(19)
2014–2015	Mladost Podgorica	31	(6)
2015–2016	Rudar Pljevlja	43	(2)
2017–2021	Iskra Danilovgrad	116	(2)

International career^{‡}
2013–2014	Montenegro	3	(1)
- * Club domestic league appearances and goals as of 12 September 2020 ‡ National team caps and goals as of 28 October 2014

Miroje Jovanović (Serbian Cyrillic: Мироје Јовановић; born 10 March 1987) is a Montenegrin retired footballer who played as a midfielder.

== International career ==
Jovanović made his debut for Montenegro in a November 2013 friendly match against Luxembourg, immediately scoring on his debut and has earned a total of three caps, scoring one goal. His final international was a May 2014 friendly against Iran.
