= Elsad Zverotić =

Footballer (born 1986)

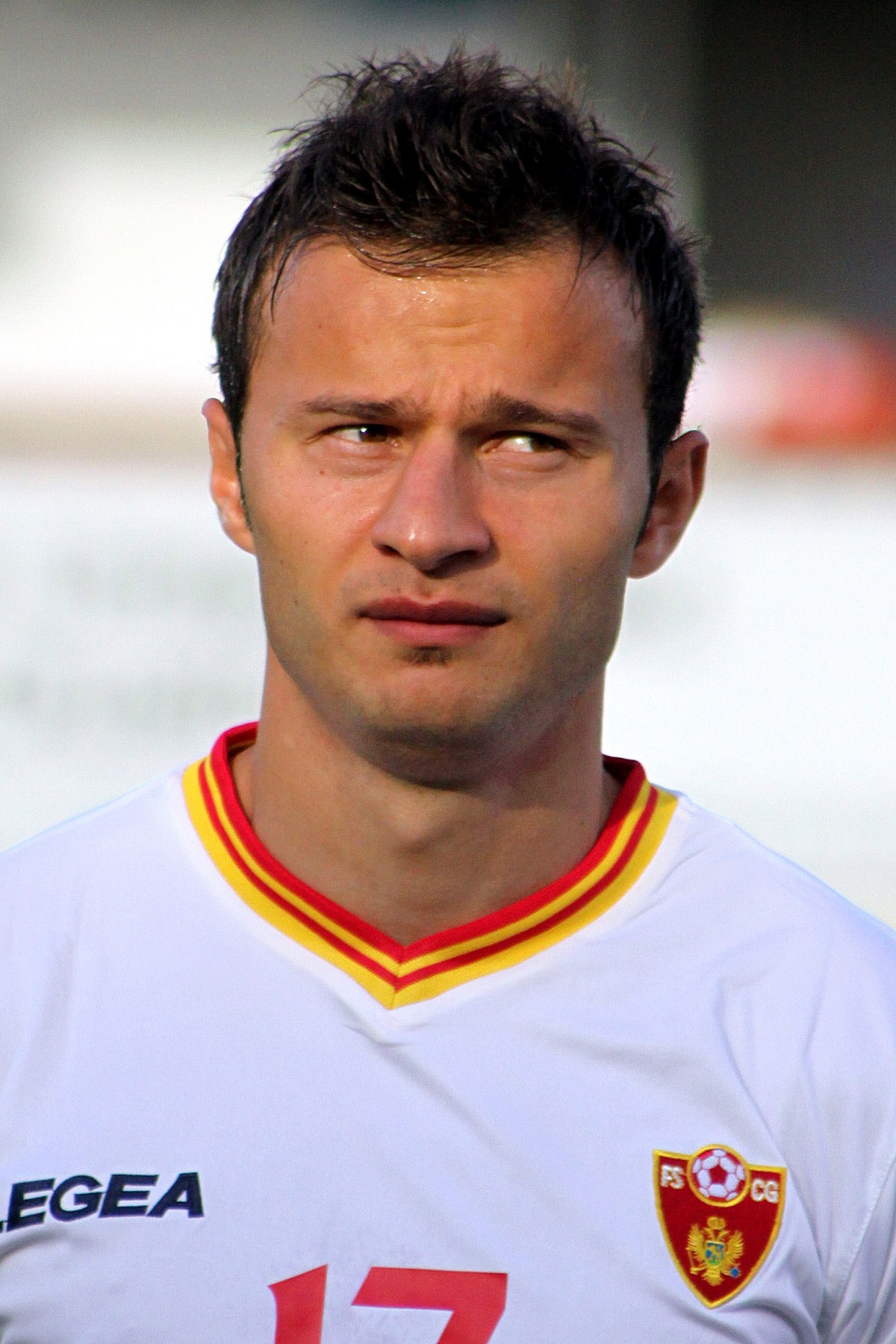
- Zverotić with Montenegro in 2014

Personal information
- Full name: Elsad Zverotić
- Date of birth: 31 October 1986 (age 39)
- Place of birth: Ivangrad, SFR Yugoslavia
- Height: 1.79 m (5 ft 10 in)
- Positions: Right back; right midfielder

Youth career
- 2002–2003: FK Berane

Senior career*
Years	Team	Apps	(Gls)
2003–2004	FC Bazenheid	30	(2)
2004–2008	FC Wil	114	(2)
2008–2011	FC Luzern	84	(2)
2011–2013	Young Boys	58	(1)
2013–2015	Fulham	16	(0)
2015–2017	Sion	92	(1)
2018–2021	Aarau	92	(12)
Total		486	(20)

International career
2004	Switzerland U18	1	(0)
2007–2008	Montenegro U21	6	(1)
2008–2017	Montenegro	61	(5)
- * Club domestic league appearances and goals

Elsad Zverotić (Serbian Cyrillic: Eлcaд Звepoтић; born 31 October 1986) is a former professional footballer who played as a right-back or right midfielder. Born in SFR Yugoslavia, he played for the Switzerland under-18 national team before switching to the Montenegro under-21. He is the Montenegro senior national team's second most-capped player of all time, with 61 caps between 2008 and 2017.

== Club career ==
Zverotić joined BSC Young Boys in the summer of 2011. On 22 November 2012 in the UEFA Europa League group stage, Zverotić scored a memorable goal against Liverpool at Anfield in a 2–2 draw.

On 2 September 2013, Zverotić signed a two-year contract with Fulham, with the option for an additional year for an undisclosed fee. He left the club by mutual consent on 16 February 2015.

The following day, he returned to Switzerland, signing a two-and-a-half-year deal at Sion. In November 2017, he was one of seven players demoted to the reserve team by new manager Gabri García.

== International career ==
After beginning his career in the country, Zverotić was called up by Switzerland's under-18 side. However, he then pledged his international career to his native Montenegro, playing his first match for the Montenegro U21 team against Albania on 2 May 2007.

On 7 September 2010, Zverotić his first international goal, the only one against Bulgaria in a Euro 2012 qualifier, striking from 30 yards at the Vasil Levski National Stadium in Sofia. He scored in another qualifier against England on 7 October 2011, Montenegro's first as they came from behind to earn a 2–2 draw in Podgorica. Zverotić scored two goals in 2014 FIFA World Cup qualification, one in each of their victories over San Marino. His final international was a September 2017 FIFA World Cup qualification match against Romania.

He is the second most capped Montenegrin footballer with 61 matches after Fatos Bećiraj who has 63.

== Honours ==
Sion

- Swiss Cup: 2014–15
