= Marko Simić (footballer, born 1987) =

Montenegrin footballer (born 1987)

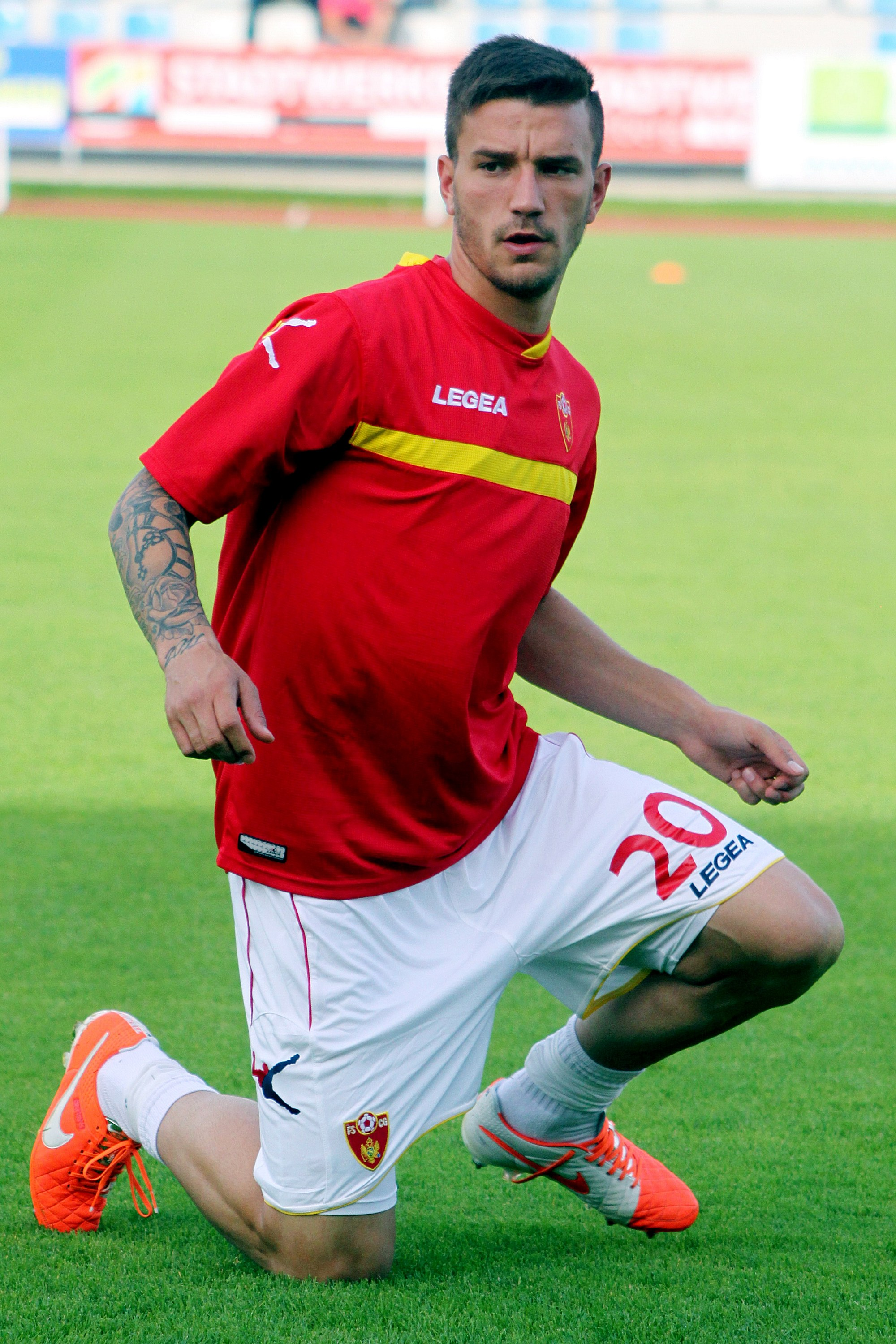
- Simić with Montenegro in a friendly versus Iran in 2014

Personal information
- Full name: Marko Simić
- Date of birth: 16 June 1987 (age 39)
- Place of birth: Obrenovac, SR Serbia, Yugoslavia
- Height: 1.87 m (6 ft 2 in)
- Position: Centre-back

Team information
- Current team: Liepāja
- Number: 55

Youth career
- Partizan

Senior career*
Years	Team	Apps	(Gls)
2006–2007	Spartak Varna	0	(0)
2007	→ Chernomorets Byala (loan)	6	(0)
2007–2008	Radnički Kragujevac	11	(0)
2008	→ Mladenovac (loan)	12	(1)
2008–2009	Budapest Honvéd	3	(0)
2009–2010	Bežanija	25	(4)
2010	Jagodina	12	(1)
2011–2012	BATE Borisov	48	(5)
2013–2016	Kayserispor	75	(4)
2016	Hapoel Tel Aviv	6	(0)
2017	Rostov	7	(0)
2017–2020	Pakhtakor Tashkent	56	(6)
2020–2022	Liepāja	39	(3)
2022–2023	Budućnost Podgorica	27	(4)
2023–2024	Sutjeska	23	(0)
2024–	Liepāja	19	(5)

International career^{‡}
2013–2021	Montenegro	50	(2)
- * Club domestic league appearances and goals as of 18 August 2025 ‡ National team caps and goals as of 16 November 2021

Marko Simić (Montenegrin: Марко Симић, pronounced [mâːrko sǐːmitɕ]; born 16 June 1987) is a professional footballer who plays as a defender for Latvian club Liepāja.

Born in Obrenovac, SR Serbia, SFR Yugoslavia (now Serbia), Marko Simić initially played in the youth categories of FK Partizan. Simić was a part of one of the best generations of BATE Borisov which made the group stages of the UEFA Champions League in 2011 and 2012. He made his debut for the Montenegro national team in 2013.

== Club career ==
=== Spartak Varna ===
In January 2007 Simić joined Bulgarian A PFG side Spartak Varna. He made his team début on 3 February in a 3–1 friendly win over Svetkavitsa, but he never played in competitive match for Spartak. One months later Simić joined North-East V AFG club Chernomorets Byala on loan and earned 6 appearances to the end of the season.

=== Journeyman years ===
In summer of 2007 he signed with Serbian League West side FK Radnički Kragujevac. After a loan spell with OFK Mladenovac during the second half of the season, he moved to Hungary to play with Budapest Honvéd FC in the Hungarian Championship. In summer 2009 he was back to Serbia to play with Serbian First League (second tier) club FK Bežanija. The following summer he moved to FK Jagodina playing in the Serbian SuperLiga where he made 12 league appearances scoring one goal during the first half of the 2010–11 season.

=== BATE Borisov ===
During the winter break he moved to FC BATE Borisov in the Belarusian Premier League. He has established himself as a starter for the team. Simić featured in BATE's lineups in the UEFA Champions League in 2011 and 2012, featuring against Barcelona, Milan, and Bayern Munich.

=== Kayserispor ===
In the winter 2013 transfer window, Simić moved to Kayserispor, whose coach at the time, Robert Prosinečki, was instrumental in bringing Simić to the club.

=== Rostov ===
On 14 March 2017, he signed a short-term deal with the Russian Premier League side FC Rostov until the end of the 2016–17 season after Rostov's first-choice defender Vladimir Granat suffered a season-ending injury.

== International career ==
On 29 September 2011, he received his first ever call for the Serbia national team for the upcoming UEFA Euro 2012 qualifying matches against Italy and Slovenia on 7 and 11 October, but did not debut.

Later, he received a call for the Montenegro national football team and debuted in a friendly match played against Belarus on 14 August 2013. As of 15 October 2020, he has earned a total of 43 caps, scoring 1 goal.

== Career statistics ==
=== Club ===
As of 25 May 2023.

Appearances and goals by club, season and competition
Club	Season	League			Cup		League Cup		Continental		Other		Total	
Club	Season	Division	Apps	Goals	Apps	Goals	Apps	Goals	Apps	Goals	Apps	Goals	Apps	Goals
Radnički Kragujevac	2007–08	Serbian League West	11	0	0	0	—		—		—		11	0
Mladenovac (loan)	2007–08	Serbian First League	12	1	0	0	—		—		—		12	1
Budapest Honvéd	2008–09	NB I	3	0	0	0	—		—		—		3	0
Bežanija	2009–10	Serbian First League	25	4	0	0	—		—		—		25	4
Jagodina	2010–11	Serbian Superliga	12	1	1	0	—		—		—		13	1
BATE Borisov	2011	Belarusian Premier League	26	3	0	0	—		14	2	0	0	40	5
BATE Borisov	2012	Belarusian Premier League	22	2	2	0	—		9	0	—		33	2
BATE Borisov	Total		48	5	2	0	—		23	2	—		73	5
Kayserispor	2012–13	Süper Lig	15	0	—		—		—		—		15	0
Kayserispor	2013–14	Süper Lig	12	0	2	0	—		—		—		14	0
Kayserispor	2014–15	TFF First League	24	3	4	1	—		—		—		28	4
Kayserispor	2015–16	Süper Lig	24	1	6	1	—		—		—		30	2
Kayserispor	Total		75	4	12	2	—		—		—		87	6
Hapoel Tel Aviv	2016–17	Israeli Premier League	6	0	0	0	3	0	—		—		7	0
Rostov	2016–17	Russian Premier League	7	0	—		—		0	0	—		7	0
Pakhtakor	2017	Uzbekistan Super League	13	3	—		—		—		—		13	3
Pakhtakor	2018	Uzbekistan Super League	25	1	1	0	—		1	0	—		27	1
Pakhtakor	2019	Uzbekistan Super League	15	2	3	0	3	0	3	0	—		24	2
Pakhtakor	Total		53	6	4	0	3	0	4	0	—		65	6
Liepāja	2020	Virslīga	11	0	3	0	—		—		—		14	0
Liepāja	2021	Virslīga	22	1	3	1	—		4	0	—		29	2
Liepāja	2022	Virslīga	6	2	0	0	—		—		—		6	2
Liepāja	Total		39	3	6	1	—		4	0	—		49	4
Budućnost Podgorica	2022–23	Montenegrin First League	27	4	1	0	—		—		—		28	4
Career total			318	28	26	3	6	0	31	2	0	0	350	33

=== International ===
As of match played 16 November 2021

Appearances and goals by national team and year
National team	Year	Apps	Goals
Montenegro	2013	2	0
Montenegro	2014	5	0
Montenegro	2015	7	0
Montenegro	2016	6	0
Montenegro	2017	4	1
Montenegro	2018	9	0
Montenegro	2019	8	0
Montenegro	2020	4	0
Montenegro	2021	5	1
Montenegro	2022	0	0
Total		50	2

=== International goals ===
Scores and results list Montenegro's goal tally first.

No.	Date	Venue	Opponent	Score	Result	Competition
1.	1 September 2017	Astana Arena, Astana, Kazakhstan	Kazakhstan	3–0	3–0	2018 FIFA World Cup qualification
2.	27 March 2021	Podgorica City Stadium, Podgorica, Montenegro	Gibraltar	2–1	4–1	2022 FIFA World Cup qualification
