= Łukasz Piszczek =

Polish footballer (born 1985)

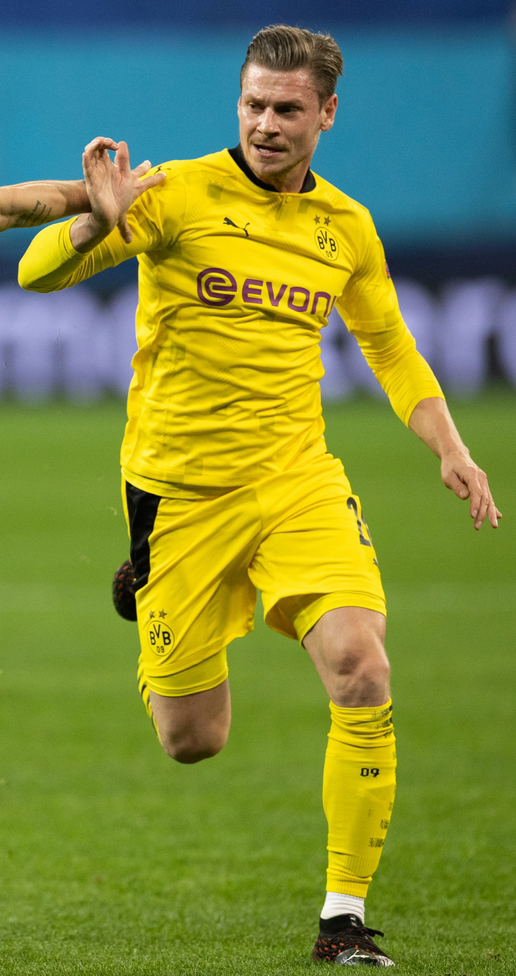
- Piszczek playing for Borussia Dortmund in 2020

Personal information
- Full name: Łukasz Piotr Piszczek
- Date of birth: 3 June 1985 (age 41)
- Place of birth: Czechowice-Dziedzice, Poland
- Height: 1.84 m (6 ft 0 in)
- Positions: Right-back; centre-back

Team information
- Current team: Goczałkowice-Zdrój (head coach)

Youth career
- 1992–2001: Goczałkowice-Zdrój
- 2001–2004: Gwarek Zabrze

Senior career*
Years	Team	Apps	(Gls)
2004–2010	Hertha BSC	68	(3)
2004–2007	→ Zagłębie Lubin (loan)	69	(14)
2010–2021	Borussia Dortmund	264	(16)
2021–2024	Goczałkowice-Zdrój	51	(3)
2025	Goczałkowice-Zdrój	23	(1)
Total		475	(37)

International career
2003–2005	Poland U19	8	(8)
2005	Poland U21	2	(0)
2007–2019	Poland	66	(3)

Managerial career
- 2023–2024: Goczałkowice-Zdrój (player-manager)
- 2025: Goczałkowice-Zdrój (player-manager)
- 2025–2026: GKS Tychy
- 2026–: Goczałkowice-Zdrój
- * Club domestic league appearances and goals

Łukasz Piotr Piszczek (Polish pronunciation: [ˈwukaʂ ˈpiʂt͡ʂɛk]; born 3 June 1985) is a Polish professional football manager and former player who played mainly as a right-back. He is the current manager of KS Goczałkowice-Zdrój.

He began his senior career as a footballer by joining Hertha Berlin in 2004. He played on loan for the Ekstraklasa club Zagłębie Lubin until 2007 when he returned to Hertha and was deployed as a right back. Between 2010–2021, he played for the German club Borussia Dortmund appearing in 363 official matches for the club, winning two consecutive Bundesliga titles in 2011 and 2012, three DFB-Pokal Cups, three DFL-Supercups as well as reaching the 2013 UEFA Champions League Final. He used to be a Poland national team member, making his debut in 2007 and going on to receive over 60 caps. He was also selected for four tournaments during his time with the national team, playing in three UEFA European Championships and the 2018 FIFA World Cup.

He confirmed his retirement from international football in 2018 following the conclusion of the 2018 FIFA World Cup. However, in November 2019 he made one more competitive appearance for the national team, informally dubbed his farewell game. In 2021, he decided to return to Goczałkowice-Zdrój, the Polish club where he started his football career as a junior. From 2024 to 2025, he served as an assistant manager of Bundesliga club Borussia Dortmund. In mid-2025, he re-joined Goczałkowice-Zdrój before being appointed manager of GKS Tychy in November that year. He left GKS by mutual consent in March 2026.

== Club career ==
=== LKS Goczałkowice-Zdrój ===
Piszczek's father, Kazimierz, the coach of the local football club of Goczałkowice-Zdrój, decided to bring him to one of the training sessions at the age of about 7–8.

=== Gwarek Zabrze ===
Piszczek began his career as a striker. In 2001, he joined Gwarek Zabrze, coached by Wincent Sosiński, where he broke many goalscoring records at junior level and in 2003 won the Polish youth championship. In 2004, he became the top scorer at the 2004 UEFA European Under-19 Championship, along with the Turk Ali Öztürk.

=== Zagłębie Lubin ===
Hertha BSC was attracted by his performances and promptly signed Piszczek in 2004, but then immediately loaned him out to Zagłębie Lubin. He made his debut on 16 October 2004, in a 7–0 win against GKS Katowice, scoring and assisting a goal for Wojciech Łobodziński in the process. With Zagłębie, he won the 2006–07 Ekstraklasa title, playing mainly as a left winger in 4–3–3 formation, with Łobodziński on the right wing and Michał Chałbiński in the centre, although he was also utilized as a centre forward. He scored 11 goals in the 2006–07 season, becoming the league's third best scorer after Chałbiński, who scored 12, and Piotr Reiss, who scored 15.

=== Hertha BSC ===
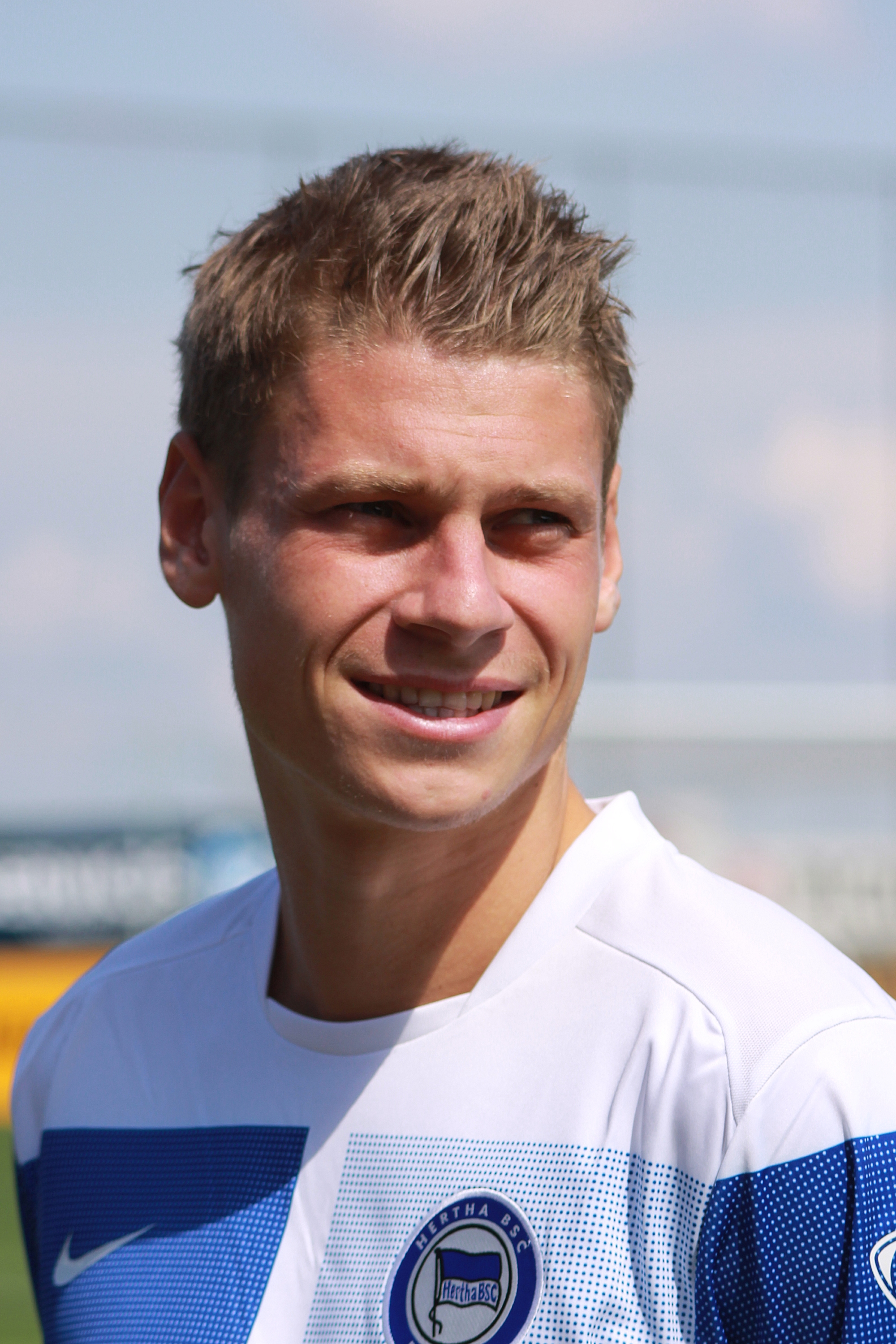
Piszczek with Hertha BSC in 2009

In the fall of 2007, after three years with Zagłębie Lubin, Hertha recalled Piszczek back to the club. He scored his first goal in the Bundesliga on 26 April 2008, to earn one point against Hannover 96.

Piszczek missed most of the first half of the 2008–09 season as the result of a hip problem that eventually required surgery. He began training again in February 2009 but in March suffered a setback due to a minor knee injury. He returned to Bundesliga action in April. At Hertha, Piszczek initially played as an offensive midfielder or on left wing, but in his second season, he started to appear at right-back after an injury to Arne Friedrich. After Friedrich recovered, Piszczek lost his place in the starting line-up, but reclaimed it in 2009–10, when Friedrich moved to centre-back.

=== Borussia Dortmund ===
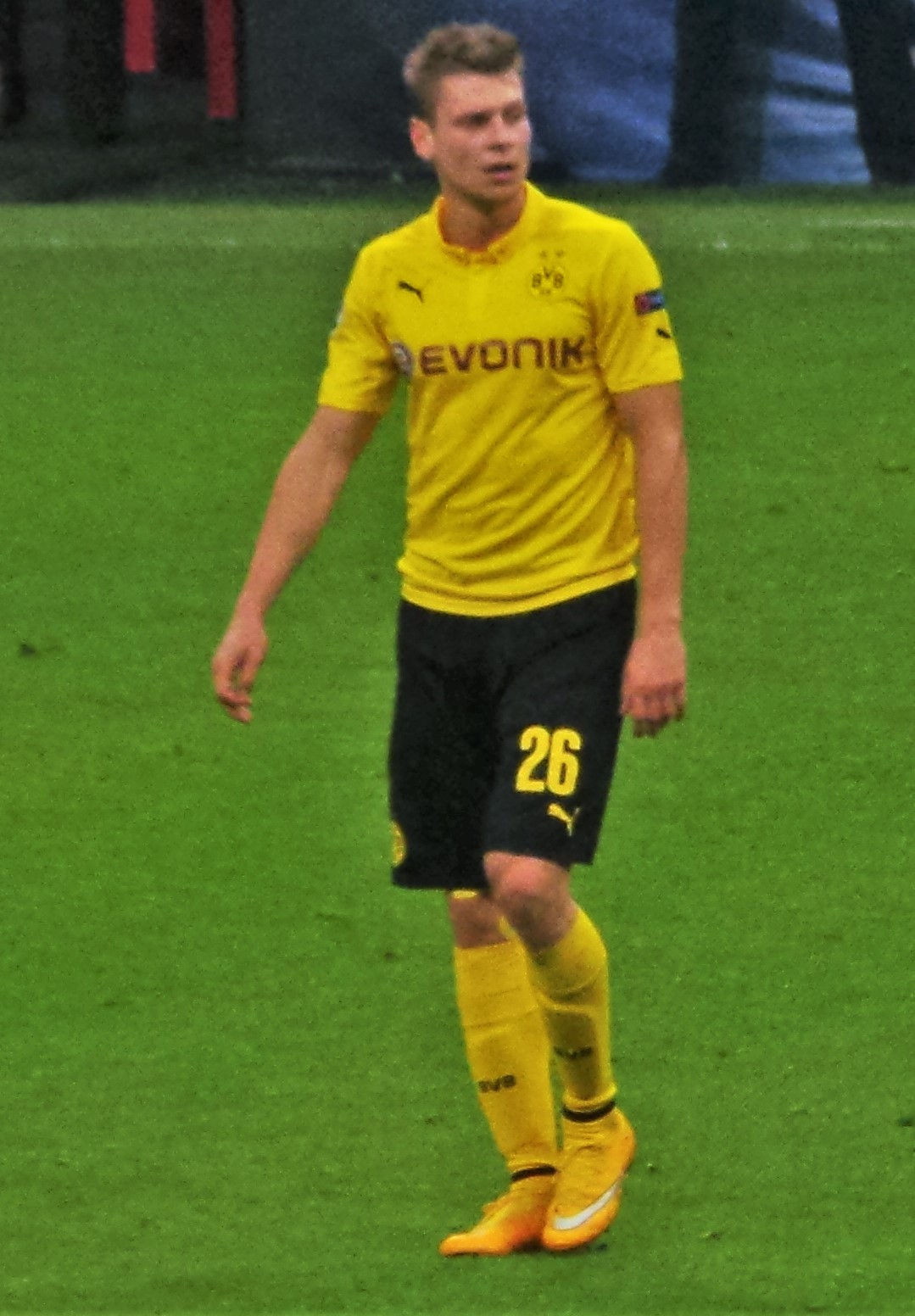
Piszczek with Borussia Dortmund in 2014

On 19 May 2010, Piszczek moved to Borussia Dortmund on a free transfer, signing a contract until June 2013. On 26 July 2011, he signed a contract extension to keep him at the club until June 2016.

On 24 September 2011, he scored his first goal for his new German club, a last-minute volley to win the match away to Mainz 05 2–1. In the 2012–13 season for Dortmund, Piszczek appeared in 11 out of 12 matches of Dortmund's road to the UEFA Champions League Final in 2013. He also started the final at right-back against Bayern Munich, but Dortmund lost by one goal after Arjen Robben scored an 89th-minute winner for Bayern. On 27 January 2016, Piszczek signed a contract extension to keep him at the club until 2018. On 6 April 2017, he extended his contract with Dortmund until 30 June 2019. On 13 March 2018, Borussia Dortmund announced that the club had reached an agreement with Piszczek for a contract extension which will keep him at the club until 30 June 2020. Piszczek also announced that he would retire from professional football at the end of his contract, a claim he later clarified saying he's still "not certain". On 20 May 2020, Piszczek pushed back his retirement plans by signing a one-year contract extension with Borussia Dortmund, keeping him at the club until 2021.

=== Return to Goczałkowice-Zdrój ===
In May 2021, Piszczek announced his return to his hometown club Goczałkowice-Zdrój, where he had established a branch of Borussia Dortmund's academy in 2019. He retired at the end of the 2023–24 season to join Nuri Şahin's coaching staff at Borussia Dortmund as an assistant. In February 2025, following Sahin's sacking, Piszczek returned to LKS. He continued playing for LKS, later renamed to KS, until his appointment as GKS Tychy's manager in November 2025.

== International career ==
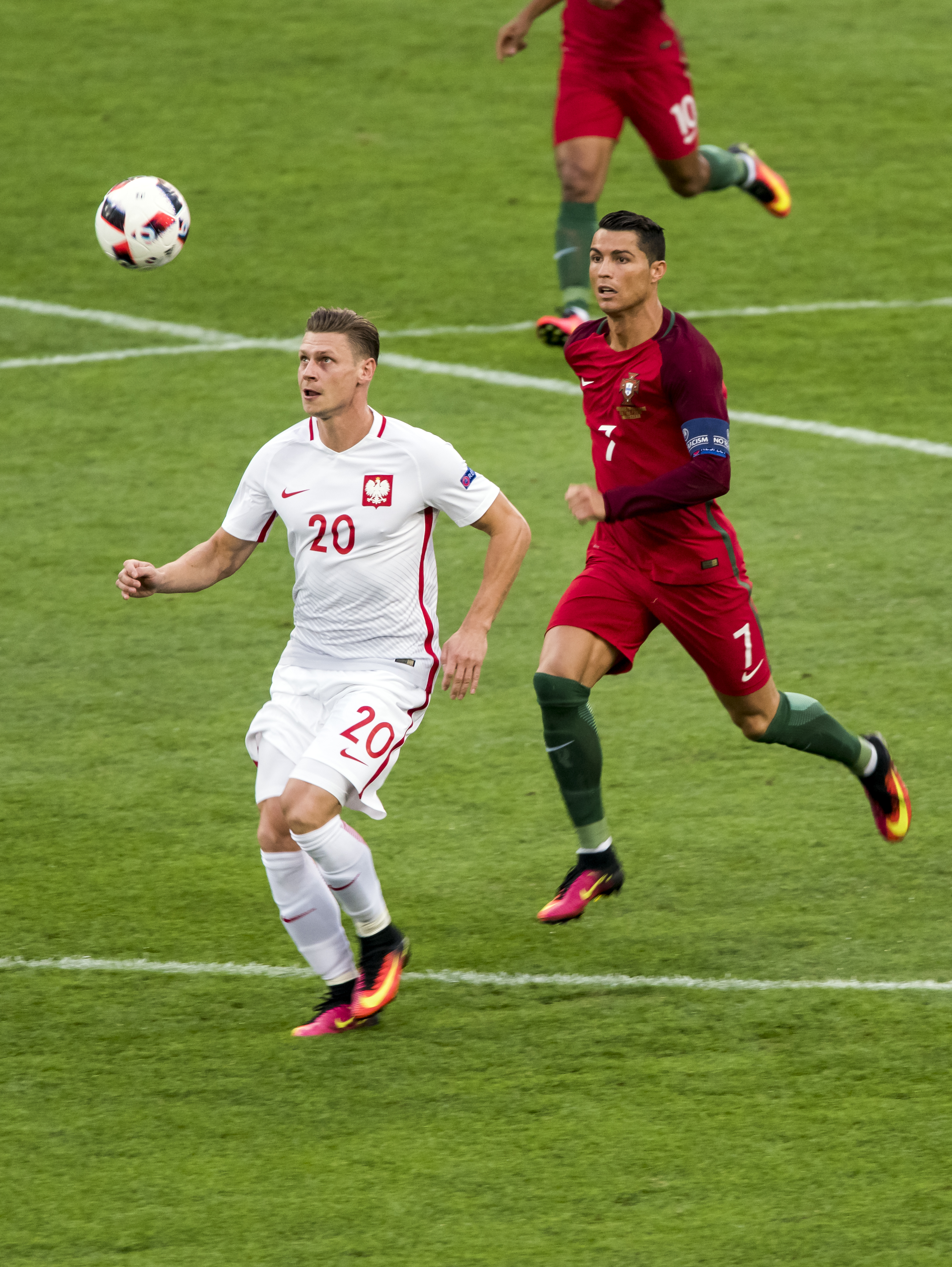
Piszczek playing for Poland at the UEFA Euro 2016

Piszczek debuted for the Poland national football team in a friendly match against Estonia on 3 February 2007. On 6 June 2008, he was selected for the final 23-man squad for UEFA Euro 2008, replacing Jakub Błaszczykowski, who was left out through injury. Piszczek made one appearance at the tournament, coming on a substitute against Germany, but after receiving a training injury, he neither played in the next match nor had further role in the tournament.

On 29 July 2011, the Polish Football Association gave a six-month suspension on Piszczek for participation in the fixing of a 2006 match against Cracovia, in which he did not play. In September 2011, the suspension was cancelled.

Piszczek was selected for the final 23-man squad for UEFA Euro 2012. He played in all three group games for Poland. On 22 March 2013, Piszczek scored his first goal for the national team in a 1–3 defeat to Ukraine. Four days later, he scored in a 5–0 win over San Marino.

Piszczek was also selected for the final 23-man squad for UEFA Euro 2016. He made his 50th appearance for the national team in the quarter-final match against Portugal, which Poland lost. Piszczek was selected for the final 23-man squad for the 2018 FIFA World Cup. However, following a disappointing tournament performance with Poland, Piszczek confirmed his retirement from international football.

In November 2019, Piszczek was named to the national team for Euro 2020 qualifying matches against Israel and Slovenia, starting in the latter which was dubbed his farewell game.

== Coaching career ==
=== LKS Goczałkowice-Zdrój ===
In March 2023, Piszczek became the player-manager of LKS. He won his first silverware as a manager on 3 April 2024, leading his club to victory in the Tychy Regional Polish Cup.

=== Assistant at Borussia ===
On 27 June 2024, Piszczek was announced as the new assistant manager of Borussia Dortmund, joining the staff of his former teammate Nuri Şahin. On 22 January 2025, he left the club along with Şahin upon his dismissal.

=== Second stint at KS Goczałkowice-Zdrój ===
On 29 July 2025, ahead of the 2025–26 III liga season, Piszczek was named KS' player-manager for a second time. He left KS on 12 November, with the club placed 4th in their group after 16 games played.

=== GKS Tychy ===
On 12 November 2025, Piszczek was appointed manager of I liga club GKS Tychy on a deal running to June 2027, with an option for another year. Piszczek and GKS agreed to part ways on 9 March 2026, after GKS went winless during Piszczek's tenure. He left the club with a record of two draws and six losses.

=== Third stint at KS Goczałkowice-Zdrój ===
Following a three month hiatus from coaching, on 29 June 2026, Piszczek was named the manager of KS for the third time, this time serving the role as head manager.

== Personal life ==
Piszczek was born in Czechowice-Dziedzice, Bielsko, and raised in Goczałkowice-Zdrój. His father, Kazimierz, who worked as a coach at Goczałkowice-Zdrój, later became the vice-president of that club. His brothers, Marek and Adam were also involved in football.

Piszczek married his fiancée Ewa Kryjom in June 2009. The couple's daughters, Sara and Nel, were born on 3 March 2011 and 15 February 2016 respectively.

On 7 September 2024, a special Borussia Dortmund legends farewell match was held in order to pay tribute to Piszczek and his compatriot Jakub Błaszczykowski who helped shape some of the most successful years in the club's history between 2010 and 2015. The match was overseen by former club coach Jürgen Klopp and attracted over 81,000 spectators at the Signal Iduna Park. The match ended in a 5–4 victory of the Błaszczykowski team.

== Career statistics ==
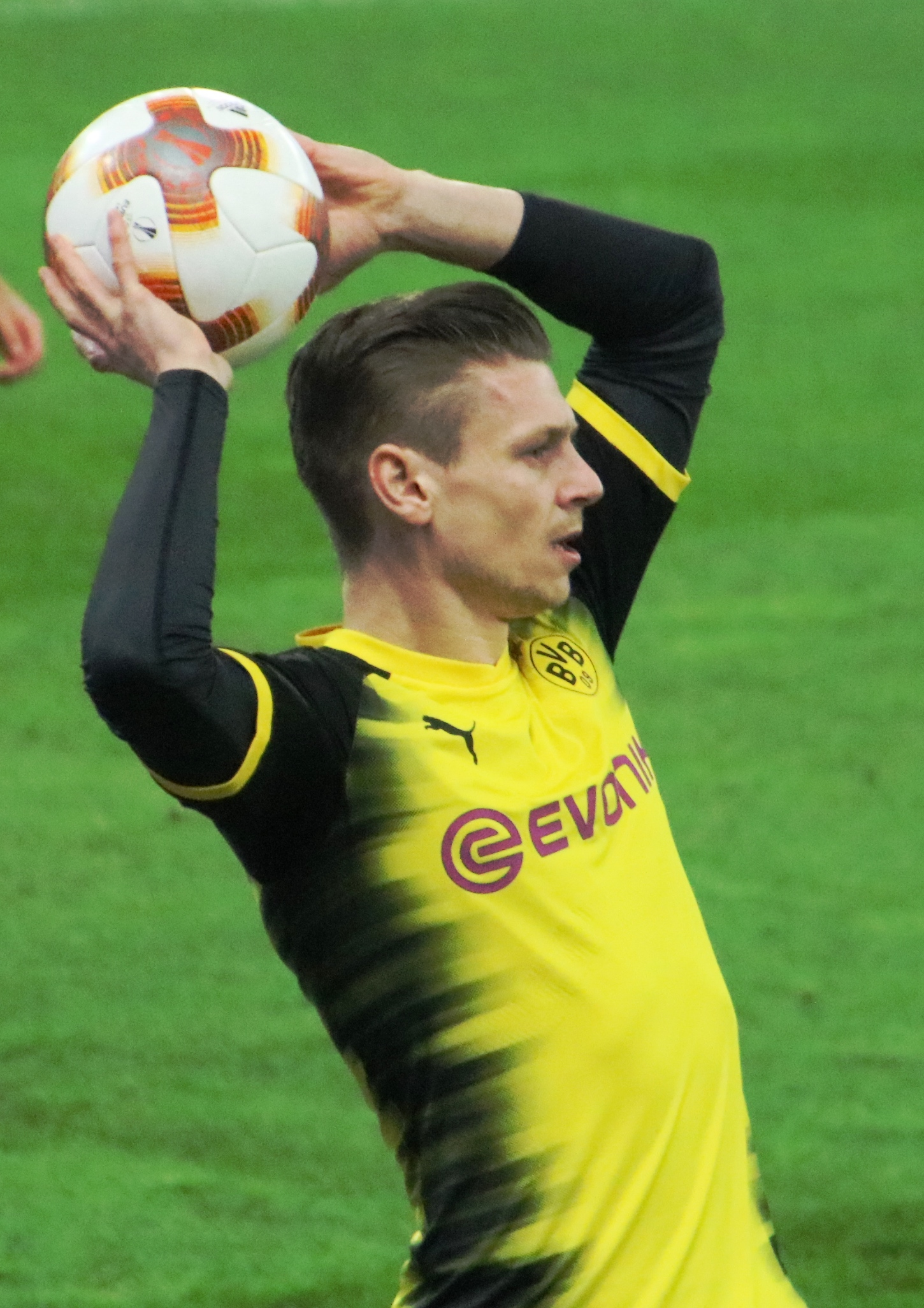
Piszczek preparing to take a throw-in during a match in 2018

=== Club ===
As of match played 8 November 2025

Appearances and goals by club, season and competition
Club	Season	League			National cup (Note: Includes Polish Cup, DFB-Pokal)		Continental		Other		Total	
Club	Season	Division	Apps	Goals	Apps	Goals	Apps	Goals	Apps	Goals	Apps	Goals
Zagłębie Lubin (loan)	2004–05	Ekstraklasa	11	2	12	4	—		—		23	6
Zagłębie Lubin (loan)	2005–06	Ekstraklasa	28	1	8	1	—		—		36	2
Zagłębie Lubin (loan)	2006–07	Ekstraklasa	30	11	2	1	2 (Note: Appearances in UEFA Cup)	0	5 (Note: Appearances in Ekstraklasa Cup)	1	39	13
Zagłębie Lubin (loan)	Total		69	14	22	6	2	0	5	1	98	21
Hertha BSC	2007–08	Bundesliga	24	1	2	0	—		—		26	1
Hertha BSC	2008–09	Bundesliga	13	0	2	0	4	3	—		19	3
Hertha BSC	2009–10	Bundesliga	31	2	2	0	9 (Note: Appearances in UEFA Europa League)	1	—		42	3
Hertha BSC	Total		68	3	6	0	13	4	—		87	7
Borussia Dortmund	2010–11	Bundesliga	33	0	1	0	7	0	—		41	0
Borussia Dortmund	2011–12	Bundesliga	32	4	6	0	6 (Note: Appearances in UEFA Champions League)	0	1 (Note: Appearance in DFL-Supercup)	0	45	4
Borussia Dortmund	2012–13	Bundesliga	29	2	4	0	12	0	1	0	46	2
Borussia Dortmund	2013–14	Bundesliga	19	3	4	0	6	0	0	0	29	3
Borussia Dortmund	2014–15	Bundesliga	22	0	2	0	5	0	1	0	30	0
Borussia Dortmund	2015–16	Bundesliga	20	0	6	1	12	1	0	0	38	2
Borussia Dortmund	2016–17	Bundesliga	25	5	5	0	9	0	0	0	39	5
Borussia Dortmund	2017–18	Bundesliga	24	0	1	0	5 (Note: Two appearances in UEFA Champions League, three appearances in UEFA Europa League)	0	1	0	31	0
Borussia Dortmund	2018–19	Bundesliga	20	1	1	0	5	0	—		26	1
Borussia Dortmund	2019–20	Bundesliga	29	1	2	0	6	0	1	0	38	1
Borussia Dortmund	2020–21	Bundesliga	11	0	4	0	3	1	1	0	19	1
Borussia Dortmund	Total		264	16	36	1	76	1	6	0	382	19
Goczałkowice-Zdrój	2021–22	III liga, gr. III	17	0	—		—		—		17	0
Goczałkowice-Zdrój	2022–23	III liga, gr. III	10	1	—		—		—		10	1
Goczałkowice-Zdrój	2023–24	III liga, gr. III	24	2	—		—		—		24	2
Goczałkowice-Zdrój	2024–25	III liga, gr. III	13	0	—		—		—		13	0
Goczałkowice-Zdrój	2025–26	III liga, gr. III	10	1	—		—		—		10	1
Goczałkowice-Zdrój	Total		74	4	—		—		—		74	4
Goczałkowice-Zdrój II	2025–26	V liga Silesia II	0	0	2	0	—		—		2	0
Career total			475	37	66	7	91	5	11	1	643	51

=== International ===
Appearances and goals by national team and year
National team	Year	Apps	Goals
Poland
Poland	2007	2	0
Poland	2008	4	0
Poland	2009	0	0
Poland	2010	7	0
Poland	2011	8	0
Poland	2012	11	0
Poland	2013	2	2
Poland	2014	5	0
Poland	2015	5	0
Poland	2016	9	0
Poland	2017	6	1
Poland	2018	6	0
Poland	2019	1	0
Total		66	3

Scores and results list Poland's goal tally first, score column indicates score after each Piszczek goal.

List of international goals scored by Łukasz Piszczek
No.	Date	Venue	Opponent	Score	Result	Competition
1	22 March 2013	Stadion Narodowy, Warsaw, Poland	Ukraine	1–2	1–3	2014 FIFA World Cup qualification
2	26 March 2013	Stadion Narodowy, Warsaw, Poland	San Marino	2–0	5–0	2014 FIFA World Cup qualification
3	26 March 2017	Stadion pod Goricom, Podgorica, Montenegro	Montenegro	2–1	2–1	2018 FIFA World Cup qualification

== Managerial statistics ==
As of match played 6 March 2026

Managerial record by team and tenure
Team	From	To	Record							
Team	From	To	G	W	D	L	GF	GA	GD	Win %
Goczałkowice-Zdrój (player-manager)	4 March 2023	27 June 2024	59	27	17	15	107	56	+51	45.76
Goczałkowice-Zdrój (player-manager)	29 July 2025	12 November 2025	20	11	6	3	59	16	+43	55.00
GKS Tychy	12 November 2025	9 March 2026	8	0	2	6	6	20	−14	0.00
Goczałkowice-Zdrój	29 June 2026	Present	0	0	0	0	0	0	+0	—
Total			87	38	25	24	172	92	+80	43.68

== Honours ==
=== Player ===
Zagłębie Lubin

- Ekstraklasa: 2006–07

Borussia Dortmund

- Bundesliga: 2010–11, 2011–12
- DFB-Pokal: 2012, 2017, 2021
- DFL-Supercup: 2013, 2014, 2019
- UEFA Champions League runner-up: 2013

LKS Goczałkowice-Zdrój II

- Polish Cup (Silesia regionals): 2024–25

Individual

- Bundesliga Team of the Season: 2015–16, 2016–17
- Polish Football Association National Team of the Century: 1919–2019

=== Manager ===
LKS Goczałkowice-Zdrój

- Polish Cup (Tychy regionals): 2023–24
