= Goczałkowice Lake =

- Jezioro Goczałkowickie (Polish)
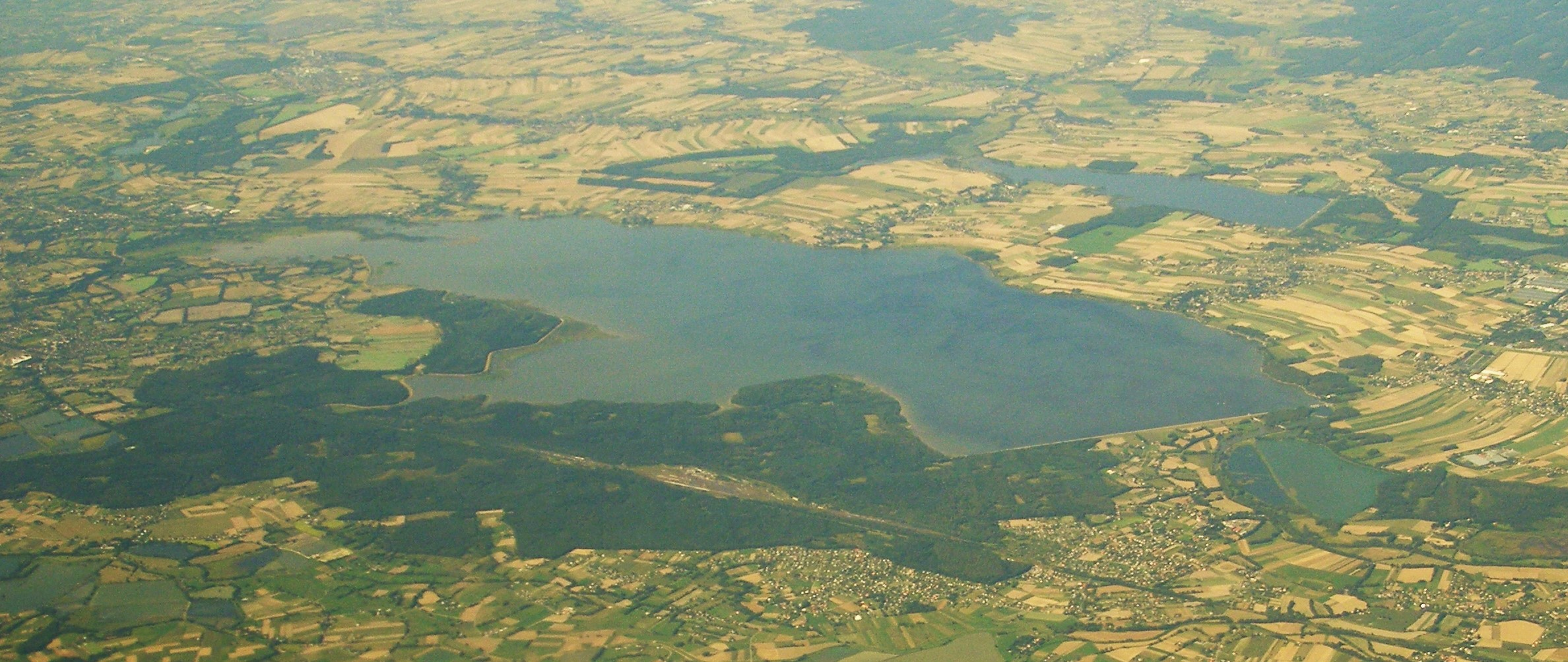
- Aerial view of Goczałkowice Reservoir

- Location within Poland
- Location: Silesian Voivodeship, Poland
- Coordinates: 49°55′48.03″N 18°51′43.75″E
- Type: Reservoir
- River sources: Vistula
- Built: 1956
- Surface area: 32 km^{2} (12 sq mi)
- Water volume: 168,000,000 m^{3} (5.9×10^{9} cu ft)

Goczałkowice Lake (Polish: Jezioro Goczałkowickie) is an artificial water reservoir close to Goczałkowice-Zdrój in the Silesian Voivodeship in Poland created with a dam on the Vistula in 1956. The area of the reservoir is 32 square kilometres and its capacity is 168 million m³. It is around 75 kilometres west of Kraków.

Dam Length: Approx 2,980 meters.

Dam Height: Around 14 meters.

The shores of the lake are the breeding area for many bird species.
