= UEFA Euro 2012 squads =

List of European football squads

The following is a list of squads for each national team competing at the Euro 2012 in Poland and Ukraine. The tournament started on 8 June 2012 and the final took place in Kyiv on 1 July 2012.

Each national team had to submit a squad of 23 players by 29 May 2012, three of whom must be goalkeepers. If a player was injured severely enough to prevent his participation in the tournament before his team's first match, he could be replaced by another player.

Club memberships are correct as of the 2011–12 season. Caps and goals correct as of 18 June 2012. Ages are correct as of 8 June 2012, the opening day of the tournament.

== Group A ==
=== Poland ===
Manager: Franciszek Smuda

On 2 May 2012, Smuda named a provisional list of 23 players for the tournament, along with a seven-man reserve list. Łukasz Fabiański withdrew from the squad on 26 May 2012 with a shoulder injury and was replaced by Grzegorz Sandomierski from the reserve list; Smuda named his 23-man final squad the following day.

No.	Pos.	Player	Date of birth (age)	Caps	Goals	Club
1	GK	Wojciech Szczęsny	18 April 1990 (aged 22)	11	0	(The Football Association) Arsenal
2	DF	Sebastian Boenisch	1 February 1987 (aged 25)	9	0	(German Football Association) Werder Bremen
3	DF	Grzegorz Wojtkowiak	26 January 1984 (aged 28)	19	0	(Polish Football Association) Lech Poznań
4	DF	Marcin Kamiński	15 January 1992 (aged 20)	3	0	(Polish Football Association) Lech Poznań
5	MF	Dariusz Dudka	9 December 1983 (aged 28)	65	2	(French Football Federation) Auxerre
6	MF	Adam Matuszczyk	14 February 1989 (aged 23)	20	1	(German Football Association) Fortuna Düsseldorf
7	MF	Eugen Polanski	17 March 1986 (aged 26)	11	0	(German Football Association) Mainz 05
8	MF	Maciej Rybus	19 August 1989 (aged 22)	22	1	(Russian Football Union) Terek Grozny
9	FW	Robert Lewandowski	21 August 1988 (aged 23)	45	15	(German Football Association) Borussia Dortmund
10	MF	Ludovic Obraniak	10 November 1984 (aged 27)	26	5	(French Football Federation) Bordeaux
11	MF	Rafał Murawski	9 October 1981 (aged 30)	46	1	(Polish Football Association) Lech Poznań
12	GK	Grzegorz Sandomierski	5 September 1989 (aged 22)	3	0	(Polish Football Association) Jagiellonia Białystok
13	DF	Marcin Wasilewski	9 June 1980 (aged 31)	51	2	(Royal Belgian Football Association) Anderlecht
14	DF	Jakub Wawrzyniak	7 July 1983 (aged 28)	26	0	(Polish Football Association) Legia Warsaw
15	DF	Damien Perquis	4 October 1984 (aged 27)	10	1	(French Football Federation) Sochaux
16	MF	Jakub Błaszczykowski (captain)	14 December 1985 (aged 26)	54	10	(German Football Association) Borussia Dortmund
17	FW	Artur Sobiech	12 June 1990 (aged 21)	5	1	(German Football Association) Hannover 96
18	MF	Adrian Mierzejewski	4 November 1986 (aged 25)	25	1	(Turkish Football Federation) Trabzonspor
19	MF	Rafał Wolski	10 November 1992 (aged 19)	3	0	(Polish Football Association) Legia Warsaw
20	DF	Łukasz Piszczek	3 June 1985 (aged 27)	27	0	(German Football Association) Borussia Dortmund
21	MF	Kamil Grosicki	8 June 1988 (aged 24)	14	0	(Turkish Football Federation) Sivasspor
22	GK	Przemysław Tytoń	4 January 1987 (aged 25)	8	0	(Royal Dutch Football Association) PSV Eindhoven
23	FW	Paweł Brożek	21 April 1983 (aged 29)	36	8	(Turkish Football Federation) Trabzonspor

=== Greece ===
Manager: (Portugal) Fernando Santos

Santos named his first shortlist, composed of players based abroad, on 10 May 2012, and the second, composed of Greece-based players on 17 May 2012, totalling a 25-player provisional list. On 28 May 2012, Santos announced his 23-man squad.

No.	Pos.	Player	Date of birth (age)	Caps	Goals	Club
1	GK	Kostas Chalkias	30 May 1974 (aged 38)	32	0	(Hellenic Football Federation) PAOK
2	MF	Giannis Maniatis	12 October 1986 (aged 25)	13	0	(Hellenic Football Federation) Olympiacos
3	DF	Georgios Tzavellas	26 November 1987 (aged 24)	8	0	(French Football Federation) Monaco (Note: Monaco was a Monegasque side competing within the French football system.)
4	DF	Stelios Malezas	11 March 1985 (aged 27)	2	0	(Hellenic Football Federation) PAOK
5	DF	Kyriakos Papadopoulos	23 February 1992 (aged 20)	12	3	(German Football Association) Schalke 04
6	MF	Grigoris Makos	18 January 1987 (aged 25)	13	0	(Hellenic Football Federation) AEK Athens
7	FW	Georgios Samaras	21 February 1985 (aged 27)	58	8	(Scottish Football Association) Celtic
8	DF	Avraam Papadopoulos	3 December 1984 (aged 27)	34	0	(Hellenic Football Federation) Olympiacos
9	FW	Nikos Liberopoulos	4 August 1975 (aged 36)	76	13	(Hellenic Football Federation) AEK Athens
10	MF	Giorgos Karagounis (captain)	6 March 1977 (aged 35)	120	9	(Hellenic Football Federation) Panathinaikos
11	FW	Kostas Mitroglou	12 March 1988 (aged 24)	14	0	(Hellenic Football Federation) Atromitos
12	GK	Alexandros Tzorvas	12 August 1982 (aged 29)	16	0	(Italian Football Federation) Palermo
13	GK	Michalis Sifakis	9 September 1984 (aged 27)	15	0	(Hellenic Football Federation) Aris
14	FW	Dimitris Salpingidis	18 August 1981 (aged 30)	60	9	(Hellenic Football Federation) PAOK
15	DF	Vasilis Torosidis	10 June 1985 (aged 26)	48	6	(Hellenic Football Federation) Olympiacos
16	MF	Georgios Fotakis	29 October 1981 (aged 30)	12	2	(Hellenic Football Federation) PAOK
17	FW	Theofanis Gekas	23 May 1980 (aged 32)	62	22	(Turkish Football Federation) Samsunspor
18	MF	Sotiris Ninis	3 April 1990 (aged 22)	22	2	(Hellenic Football Federation) Panathinaikos
19	DF	Sokratis Papastathopoulos	9 June 1988 (aged 23)	31	0	(German Football Association) Werder Bremen
20	DF	José Holebas	27 June 1984 (aged 27)	7	0	(Hellenic Football Federation) Olympiacos
21	MF	Kostas Katsouranis	21 June 1979 (aged 32)	95	9	(Hellenic Football Federation) Panathinaikos
22	MF	Kostas Fortounis	16 October 1992 (aged 19)	5	0	(German Football Association) 1. FC Kaiserslautern
23	MF	Giannis Fetfatzidis	21 December 1990 (aged 21)	13	3	(Hellenic Football Federation) Olympiacos

=== Russia ===
Manager: (Netherlands) Dick Advocaat

On 11 May 2012, Advocaat named a provisional list of 26 players for the tournament. Vasili Berezutski and Roman Shishkin withdrew on 20 and 24 May respectively, Berezutski with a thigh injury and Shishkin due to a stomach complaint. Advocaat named his final squad on 25 May 2012; Kirill Nababkin was named having not been included in the provisional party.

A 2012 friendly match against Lithuania, recognized by the Russian Football Union but not by FIFA, is not counted for caps.

No.	Pos.	Player	Date of birth (age)	Caps	Goals	Club
1	GK	Igor Akinfeev	8 April 1986 (aged 26)	51	0	(Russian Football Union) CSKA Moscow
2	DF	Aleksandr Anyukov	28 September 1982 (aged 29)	64	1	(Russian Football Union) Zenit Saint Petersburg
3	DF	Roman Sharonov	8 September 1976 (aged 35)	8	0	(Russian Football Union) Rubin Kazan
4	DF	Sergei Ignashevich	14 July 1979 (aged 32)	74	5	(Russian Football Union) CSKA Moscow
5	DF	Yuri Zhirkov	20 August 1983 (aged 28)	51	0	(Russian Football Union) Anzhi Makhachkala
6	MF	Roman Shirokov	6 July 1981 (aged 30)	21	6	(Russian Football Union) Zenit Saint Petersburg
7	MF	Igor Denisov	17 May 1984 (aged 28)	25	0	(Russian Football Union) Zenit Saint Petersburg
8	MF	Konstantin Zyryanov	5 October 1977 (aged 34)	49	7	(Russian Football Union) Zenit Saint Petersburg
9	MF	Marat Izmailov	21 September 1982 (aged 29)	32	2	(Portuguese Football Federation) Sporting CP
10	FW	Andrey Arshavin (captain)	29 May 1981 (aged 31)	70	17	(Russian Football Union) Zenit Saint Petersburg
11	FW	Aleksandr Kerzhakov	27 November 1982 (aged 29)	60	19	(Russian Football Union) Zenit Saint Petersburg
12	DF	Aleksei Berezutski	20 June 1982 (aged 29)	47	0	(Russian Football Union) CSKA Moscow
13	GK	Anton Shunin	27 January 1987 (aged 25)	2	0	(Russian Football Union) Dynamo Moscow
14	FW	Roman Pavlyuchenko	15 December 1981 (aged 30)	46	20	(Russian Football Union) Lokomotiv Moscow
15	DF	Dmitri Kombarov	22 January 1987 (aged 25)	3	0	(Russian Football Union) Spartak Moscow
16	GK	Vyacheslav Malafeev	4 March 1979 (aged 33)	25	0	(Russian Football Union) Zenit Saint Petersburg
17	MF	Alan Dzagoev	17 June 1990 (aged 21)	19	4	(Russian Football Union) CSKA Moscow
18	FW	Aleksandr Kokorin	19 March 1991 (aged 21)	4	0	(Russian Football Union) Dynamo Moscow
19	DF	Vladimir Granat	22 May 1987 (aged 25)	0	0	(Russian Football Union) Dynamo Moscow
20	FW	Pavel Pogrebnyak	8 November 1983 (aged 28)	32	8	(The Football Association) Fulham
21	DF	Kirill Nababkin	8 September 1986 (aged 25)	1	0	(Russian Football Union) CSKA Moscow
22	MF	Denis Glushakov	27 January 1987 (aged 25)	9	1	(Russian Football Union) Lokomotiv Moscow
23	MF	Igor Semshov	6 April 1978 (aged 34)	56	3	(Russian Football Union) Dynamo Moscow

=== Czech Republic ===
Manager: Michal Bílek

Michal Bílek announced his 24-man provisional squad on 14 May 2012. On 28 May 2012, he replaced Daniel Pudil with Vladimír Darida. The following day, he confirmed his 23-man squad, removing Tomáš Grigar.

No.	Pos.	Player	Date of birth (age)	Caps	Goals	Club
1	GK	Petr Čech	20 May 1982 (aged 30)	94	0	(The Football Association) Chelsea
2	DF	Theodor Gebre Selassie	24 December 1986 (aged 25)	14	0	(Football Association of the Czech Republic) Slovan Liberec
3	DF	Michal Kadlec	13 December 1984 (aged 27)	38	8	(German Football Association) Bayer Leverkusen
4	DF	Marek Suchý	29 March 1988 (aged 24)	4	0	(Russian Football Union) Spartak Moscow
5	DF	Roman Hubník	6 June 1984 (aged 28)	23	2	(German Football Association) Hertha BSC
6	DF	Tomáš Sivok	15 September 1983 (aged 28)	30	3	(Turkish Football Federation) Beşiktaş
7	FW	Tomáš Necid	13 August 1989 (aged 22)	26	7	(Russian Football Union) CSKA Moscow
8	DF	David Limberský	6 October 1983 (aged 28)	12	0	(Football Association of the Czech Republic) Viktoria Plzeň
9	FW	Jan Rezek	5 May 1982 (aged 30)	16	3	(Cyprus Football Association) Anorthosis Famagusta
10	MF	Tomáš Rosický (captain)	4 October 1980 (aged 31)	87	20	(The Football Association) Arsenal
11	MF	Milan Petržela	19 June 1983 (aged 28)	11	0	(Football Association of the Czech Republic) Viktoria Plzeň
12	DF	František Rajtoral	12 March 1986 (aged 26)	5	0	(Football Association of the Czech Republic) Viktoria Plzeň
13	MF	Jaroslav Plašil	5 January 1982 (aged 30)	75	6	(French Football Federation) Bordeaux
14	FW	Václav Pilař	13 October 1988 (aged 23)	13	3	(Football Association of the Czech Republic) Viktoria Plzeň
15	FW	Milan Baroš	28 October 1981 (aged 30)	93	41	(Turkish Football Federation) Galatasaray
16	GK	Jan Laštůvka	7 July 1982 (aged 29)	1	0	(Ukrainian Association of Football) Dnipro Dnipropetrovsk
17	MF	Tomáš Hübschman	4 September 1981 (aged 30)	47	0	(Ukrainian Association of Football) Shakhtar Donetsk
18	MF	Daniel Kolář	27 October 1985 (aged 26)	13	1	(Football Association of the Czech Republic) Viktoria Plzeň
19	MF	Petr Jiráček	2 March 1986 (aged 26)	12	3	(German Football Association) VfL Wolfsburg
20	FW	Tomáš Pekhart	26 May 1989 (aged 23)	13	0	(German Football Association) 1. FC Nürnberg
21	FW	David Lafata	18 September 1981 (aged 30)	19	3	(Football Association of the Czech Republic) Jablonec
22	MF	Vladimír Darida	8 August 1990 (aged 21)	3	0	(Football Association of the Czech Republic) Viktoria Plzeň
23	GK	Jaroslav Drobný	18 October 1979 (aged 32)	6	0	(German Football Association) Hamburger SV

== Group B ==
=== Netherlands ===
Manager: Bert van Marwijk

On 7 May 2012, Bert van Marwijk named a provisional list of 36 players for the tournament. However, Erik Pieters was forced to pull out of the squad shortly after the announcement with a foot injury. On 15 May 2012, Van Marwijk reduced his squad to 27 players. On 26 May 2012, Van Marwijk announced his 23-man squad for the tournament.

No.	Pos.	Player	Date of birth (age)	Caps	Goals	Club
1	GK	Maarten Stekelenburg	22 September 1982 (aged 29)	50	0	(Italian Football Federation) Roma
2	DF	Gregory van der Wiel	3 February 1988 (aged 24)	35	0	(Royal Dutch Football Association) Ajax
3	DF	John Heitinga	15 November 1983 (aged 28)	80	7	(The Football Association) Everton
4	DF	Joris Mathijsen	5 April 1980 (aged 32)	82	3	(Royal Spanish Football Federation) Málaga
5	DF	Wilfred Bouma	15 June 1978 (aged 33)	37	2	(Royal Dutch Football Association) PSV Eindhoven
6	MF	Mark van Bommel (captain)	22 April 1977 (aged 35)	79	10	(Italian Football Federation) Milan
7	FW	Dirk Kuyt	22 July 1980 (aged 31)	90	24	(The Football Association) Liverpool
8	MF	Nigel de Jong	30 November 1984 (aged 27)	63	1	(The Football Association) Manchester City
9	FW	Klaas-Jan Huntelaar	12 August 1983 (aged 28)	56	31	(German Football Association) Schalke 04
10	MF	Wesley Sneijder	9 June 1984 (aged 27)	87	24	(Italian Football Federation) Inter Milan
11	FW	Arjen Robben	23 January 1984 (aged 28)	60	17	(German Football Association) Bayern Munich
12	GK	Michel Vorm	20 October 1983 (aged 28)	9	0	(The Football Association) Swansea City (Note: Swansea City was a Welsh side competing within the English football system.)
13	DF	Ron Vlaar	16 February 1985 (aged 27)	9	1	(Royal Dutch Football Association) Feyenoord
14	MF	Stijn Schaars	11 January 1984 (aged 28)	19	0	(Portuguese Football Federation) Sporting CP
15	DF	Jetro Willems	30 March 1994 (aged 18)	5	0	(Royal Dutch Football Association) PSV Eindhoven
16	FW	Robin van Persie	6 August 1983 (aged 28)	68	29	(The Football Association) Arsenal
17	MF	Kevin Strootman	13 February 1990 (aged 22)	11	1	(Royal Dutch Football Association) PSV Eindhoven
18	FW	Luuk de Jong	27 August 1990 (aged 21)	7	1	(Royal Dutch Football Association) Twente
19	FW	Luciano Narsingh	13 September 1990 (aged 21)	2	0	(Royal Dutch Football Association) Heerenveen
20	MF	Ibrahim Afellay	2 April 1986 (aged 26)	41	5	(Royal Spanish Football Federation) Barcelona
21	DF	Khalid Boulahrouz	28 December 1981 (aged 30)	35	0	(German Football Association) VfB Stuttgart
22	GK	Tim Krul	3 April 1988 (aged 24)	3	0	(The Football Association) Newcastle United
23	MF	Rafael van der Vaart	11 February 1983 (aged 29)	99	19	(The Football Association) Tottenham Hotspur

=== Denmark ===
Manager: Morten Olsen

Denmark coach Morten Olsen named a 20-man squad for the tournament on 16 May 2012, with the three remaining berths to be filled. Anders Lindegaard was selected on 19 May. Jores Okore and Nicklas Pedersen were selected on 24 May. On 29 May, Thomas Sørensen was replaced by Kasper Schmeichel due to a back injury.

No.	Pos.	Player	Date of birth (age)	Caps	Goals	Club
1	GK	Stephan Andersen	26 November 1981 (aged 30)	13	0	(French Football Federation) Evian
2	MF	Christian Poulsen	28 February 1980 (aged 32)	92	6	(French Football Federation) Evian
3	DF	Simon Kjær	26 March 1989 (aged 23)	27	0	(Italian Football Federation) Roma
4	DF	Daniel Agger (captain)	12 December 1984 (aged 27)	49	6	(The Football Association) Liverpool
5	DF	Simon Poulsen	7 October 1984 (aged 27)	21	0	(Royal Dutch Football Association) AZ
6	DF	Lars Jacobsen	20 September 1979 (aged 32)	53	1	(Danish Football Association) Copenhagen
7	MF	William Kvist	24 February 1985 (aged 27)	31	0	(German Football Association) VfB Stuttgart
8	MF	Christian Eriksen	14 February 1992 (aged 20)	26	2	(Royal Dutch Football Association) Ajax
9	MF	Michael Krohn-Dehli	6 June 1983 (aged 29)	24	6	(Danish Football Association) Brøndby
10	FW	Dennis Rommedahl	22 July 1978 (aged 33)	118	21	(Danish Football Association) Brøndby
11	FW	Nicklas Bendtner	16 January 1988 (aged 24)	51	20	(The Football Association) Sunderland
12	DF	Andreas Bjelland	11 July 1988 (aged 23)	6	1	(Danish Football Association) Nordsjælland
13	DF	Jores Okore	11 August 1992 (aged 19)	3	0	(Danish Football Association) Nordsjælland
14	MF	Lasse Schöne	27 May 1986 (aged 26)	12	2	(Royal Dutch Football Association) NEC
15	MF	Michael Silberbauer	7 July 1981 (aged 30)	24	1	(Swiss Football Association) Young Boys
16	GK	Anders Lindegaard	13 April 1984 (aged 28)	5	0	(The Football Association) Manchester United
17	FW	Nicklas Pedersen	10 October 1987 (aged 24)	7	0	(Royal Dutch Football Association) Groningen
18	DF	Daniel Wass	31 May 1989 (aged 23)	6	0	(French Football Federation) Evian
19	MF	Jakob Poulsen	7 July 1983 (aged 28)	24	1	(Danish Football Association) Midtjylland
20	MF	Thomas Kahlenberg	20 March 1983 (aged 29)	38	4	(French Football Federation) Evian
21	MF	Niki Zimling	19 April 1985 (aged 27)	14	0	(Royal Belgian Football Association) Club Brugge
22	GK	Kasper Schmeichel	5 November 1986 (aged 25)	0	0	(The Football Association) Leicester City
23	FW	Tobias Mikkelsen	18 September 1986 (aged 25)	6	0	(Danish Football Association) Nordsjælland

=== Germany ===
Manager: Joachim Löw

On 7 May 2012, Löw named a provisional list of 27 players for the tournament. On 28 May 2012, Löw announced his 23-man squad.

No.	Pos.	Player	Date of birth (age)	Caps	Goals	Club
1	GK	Manuel Neuer	27 March 1986 (aged 26)	31	0	(German Football Association) Bayern Munich
2	MF	İlkay Gündoğan	24 October 1990 (aged 21)	2	0	(German Football Association) Borussia Dortmund
3	DF	Marcel Schmelzer	22 January 1988 (aged 24)	6	0	(German Football Association) Borussia Dortmund
4	DF	Benedikt Höwedes	29 February 1988 (aged 24)	8	0	(German Football Association) Schalke 04
5	DF	Mats Hummels	16 December 1988 (aged 23)	19	1	(German Football Association) Borussia Dortmund
6	MF	Sami Khedira	4 April 1987 (aged 25)	32	2	(Royal Spanish Football Federation) Real Madrid
7	MF	Bastian Schweinsteiger	1 August 1984 (aged 27)	95	23	(German Football Association) Bayern Munich
8	MF	Mesut Özil	15 October 1988 (aged 23)	38	9	(Royal Spanish Football Federation) Real Madrid
9	MF	André Schürrle	6 November 1990 (aged 21)	16	7	(German Football Association) Bayer Leverkusen
10	MF	Lukas Podolski	4 June 1985 (aged 27)	101	44	(German Football Association) 1. FC Köln
11	FW	Miroslav Klose	9 June 1978 (aged 33)	121	64	(Italian Football Federation) Lazio
12	GK	Tim Wiese	17 December 1981 (aged 30)	6	0	(German Football Association) Werder Bremen
13	MF	Thomas Müller	13 September 1989 (aged 22)	32	10	(German Football Association) Bayern Munich
14	DF	Holger Badstuber	13 March 1989 (aged 23)	25	1	(German Football Association) Bayern Munich
15	MF	Lars Bender	27 April 1989 (aged 23)	9	1	(German Football Association) Bayer Leverkusen
16	DF	Philipp Lahm (captain)	11 November 1983 (aged 28)	91	5	(German Football Association) Bayern Munich
17	DF	Per Mertesacker	29 September 1984 (aged 27)	81	1	(The Football Association) Arsenal
18	MF	Toni Kroos	4 January 1990 (aged 22)	30	2	(German Football Association) Bayern Munich
19	MF	Mario Götze	3 June 1992 (aged 20)	15	2	(German Football Association) Borussia Dortmund
20	DF	Jérôme Boateng	3 September 1988 (aged 23)	25	0	(German Football Association) Bayern Munich
21	MF	Marco Reus	31 May 1989 (aged 23)	8	2	(German Football Association) Borussia Mönchengladbach
22	GK	Ron-Robert Zieler	12 February 1989 (aged 23)	1	0	(German Football Association) Hannover 96
23	FW	Mario Gómez	10 July 1985 (aged 26)	57	25	(German Football Association) Bayern Munich

=== Portugal ===
Manager: Paulo Bento

Paulo Bento named his final 23-man squad on 14 May 2012. On 23 May, Hugo Viana replaced Carlos Martins after Martins suffered a calf injury.

No.	Pos.	Player	Date of birth (age)	Caps	Goals	Club
1	GK	Eduardo	19 September 1982 (aged 29)	28	0	(Portuguese Football Federation) Benfica
2	DF	Bruno Alves	27 November 1981 (aged 30)	55	5	(Russian Football Union) Zenit Saint Petersburg
3	DF	Pepe	26 February 1983 (aged 29)	44	3	(Royal Spanish Football Federation) Real Madrid
4	MF	Miguel Veloso	11 May 1986 (aged 26)	29	2	(Italian Football Federation) Genoa
5	DF	Fábio Coentrão	11 March 1988 (aged 24)	27	1	(Royal Spanish Football Federation) Real Madrid
6	MF	Custódio	24 May 1983 (aged 29)	4	0	(Portuguese Football Federation) Braga
7	FW	Cristiano Ronaldo (captain)	5 February 1985 (aged 27)	95	35	(Royal Spanish Football Federation) Real Madrid
8	MF	João Moutinho	8 September 1986 (aged 25)	48	2	(Portuguese Football Federation) Porto
9	FW	Hugo Almeida	23 May 1984 (aged 28)	44	15	(Turkish Football Federation) Beşiktaş
10	FW	Ricardo Quaresma	26 September 1983 (aged 28)	35	3	(Turkish Football Federation) Beşiktaş
11	FW	Nélson Oliveira	8 August 1991 (aged 20)	7	0	(Portuguese Football Federation) Benfica
12	GK	Rui Patrício	15 February 1988 (aged 24)	16	0	(Portuguese Football Federation) Sporting CP
13	DF	Ricardo Costa	16 May 1981 (aged 31)	11	0	(Royal Spanish Football Federation) Valencia
14	DF	Rolando	31 August 1985 (aged 26)	17	0	(Portuguese Football Federation) Porto
15	MF	Rúben Micael	19 August 1986 (aged 25)	8	2	(Royal Spanish Football Federation) Atlético Madrid
16	MF	Raul Meireles	17 March 1983 (aged 29)	61	8	(The Football Association) Chelsea
17	FW	Nani	17 November 1986 (aged 25)	59	13	(The Football Association) Manchester United
18	FW	Silvestre Varela	2 February 1985 (aged 27)	9	2	(Portuguese Football Federation) Porto
19	DF	Miguel Lopes	19 December 1986 (aged 25)	1	0	(Portuguese Football Federation) Braga
20	MF	Hugo Viana	15 January 1983 (aged 29)	27	1	(Portuguese Football Federation) Braga
21	DF	João Pereira	25 February 1984 (aged 28)	19	0	(Portuguese Football Federation) Sporting CP
22	GK	Beto	1 May 1982 (aged 30)	2	0	(Romanian Football Federation) CFR Cluj
23	FW	Hélder Postiga	2 August 1982 (aged 29)	53	20	(Royal Spanish Football Federation) Zaragoza

== Group C ==
=== Spain ===
Manager: Vicente del Bosque

Vicente del Bosque named a squad to play in a set of warm-up matches on 15 May 2012, but it did not include any Barcelona, Athletic Bilbao or Chelsea players as the two Spanish sides were preparing for the Copa del Rey final on 25 May, while Chelsea were to take on Bayern Munich in the UEFA Champions League final on 19 May. On 21 May 2012, Del Bosque called-up Chelsea players Fernando Torres and Juan Mata for the friendly matches. On 27 May, Del Bosque gave the final squad list, complete with Barcelona and Athletic Bilbao players.

No.	Pos.	Player	Date of birth (age)	Caps	Goals	Club
1	GK	Iker Casillas (captain)	20 May 1981 (aged 31)	137	0	(Royal Spanish Football Federation) Real Madrid
2	DF	Raúl Albiol	4 September 1985 (aged 26)	34	0	(Royal Spanish Football Federation) Real Madrid
3	DF	Gerard Piqué	2 February 1987 (aged 25)	45	4	(Royal Spanish Football Federation) Barcelona
4	MF	Javi Martínez	2 September 1988 (aged 23)	8	0	(Royal Spanish Football Federation) Athletic Bilbao
5	DF	Juanfran	9 January 1985 (aged 27)	1	0	(Royal Spanish Football Federation) Atlético Madrid
6	MF	Andrés Iniesta	11 May 1984 (aged 28)	71	10	(Royal Spanish Football Federation) Barcelona
7	FW	Pedro	28 July 1987 (aged 24)	18	2	(Royal Spanish Football Federation) Barcelona
8	MF	Xavi	25 January 1980 (aged 32)	115	11	(Royal Spanish Football Federation) Barcelona
9	FW	Fernando Torres	20 March 1984 (aged 28)	98	31	(The Football Association) Chelsea
10	MF	Cesc Fàbregas	4 May 1987 (aged 25)	69	10	(Royal Spanish Football Federation) Barcelona
11	FW	Álvaro Negredo	20 August 1985 (aged 26)	12	6	(Royal Spanish Football Federation) Sevilla
12	GK	Víctor Valdés	14 January 1982 (aged 30)	8	0	(Royal Spanish Football Federation) Barcelona
13	MF	Juan Mata	28 April 1988 (aged 24)	19	6	(The Football Association) Chelsea
14	MF	Xabi Alonso	25 November 1981 (aged 30)	102	15	(Royal Spanish Football Federation) Real Madrid
15	DF	Sergio Ramos	30 March 1986 (aged 26)	92	6	(Royal Spanish Football Federation) Real Madrid
16	MF	Sergio Busquets	16 July 1988 (aged 23)	45	0	(Royal Spanish Football Federation) Barcelona
17	DF	Álvaro Arbeloa	17 January 1983 (aged 29)	41	0	(Royal Spanish Football Federation) Real Madrid
18	DF	Jordi Alba	21 March 1989 (aged 23)	11	1	(Royal Spanish Football Federation) Valencia
19	FW	Fernando Llorente	26 February 1985 (aged 27)	20	7	(Royal Spanish Football Federation) Athletic Bilbao
20	MF	Santi Cazorla	13 December 1984 (aged 27)	45	6	(Royal Spanish Football Federation) Málaga
21	MF	David Silva	8 January 1986 (aged 26)	64	18	(The Football Association) Manchester City
22	DF	Jesús Navas	21 November 1985 (aged 26)	20	2	(Royal Spanish Football Federation) Sevilla
23	GK	Pepe Reina	31 August 1982 (aged 29)	25	0	(The Football Association) Liverpool

=== Italy ===
Manager: Cesare Prandelli

Cesare Prandelli named a provisional 32-man squad on 13 May 2012, the final day of the 2011–12 Serie A season. On 29 May 2012, Prandelli announced his final squad list, with defender Domenico Criscito not considered due to match-fixing charges.

No.	Pos.	Player	Date of birth (age)	Caps	Goals	Club
1	GK	Gianluigi Buffon (captain)	28 January 1978 (aged 34)	120	0	(Italian Football Federation) Juventus
2	DF	Christian Maggio	11 February 1982 (aged 30)	19	0	(Italian Football Federation) Napoli
3	DF	Giorgio Chiellini	14 August 1984 (aged 27)	55	2	(Italian Football Federation) Juventus
4	DF	Angelo Ogbonna	23 May 1988 (aged 24)	3	0	(Italian Football Federation) Torino
5	MF	Thiago Motta	28 August 1982 (aged 29)	13	1	(French Football Federation) Paris Saint-Germain
6	DF	Federico Balzaretti	6 December 1981 (aged 30)	12	0	(Italian Football Federation) Palermo
7	DF	Ignazio Abate	12 November 1986 (aged 25)	5	0	(Italian Football Federation) Milan
8	MF	Claudio Marchisio	19 January 1986 (aged 26)	26	1	(Italian Football Federation) Juventus
9	FW	Mario Balotelli	12 August 1990 (aged 21)	14	4	(The Football Association) Manchester City
10	FW	Antonio Cassano	12 July 1982 (aged 29)	35	10	(Italian Football Federation) Milan
11	FW	Antonio Di Natale	13 October 1977 (aged 34)	42	11	(Italian Football Federation) Udinese
12	GK	Salvatore Sirigu	12 January 1987 (aged 25)	2	0	(French Football Federation) Paris Saint-Germain
13	MF	Emanuele Giaccherini	5 May 1985 (aged 27)	2	0	(Italian Football Federation) Juventus
14	GK	Morgan De Sanctis	26 March 1977 (aged 35)	5	0	(Italian Football Federation) Napoli
15	DF	Andrea Barzagli	8 May 1981 (aged 31)	33	0	(Italian Football Federation) Juventus
16	MF	Daniele De Rossi	24 July 1983 (aged 28)	78	10	(Italian Football Federation) Roma
17	FW	Fabio Borini	29 March 1991 (aged 21)	1	0	(Italian Football Federation) Roma
18	MF	Riccardo Montolivo	18 January 1985 (aged 27)	37	1	(Italian Football Federation) Fiorentina
19	DF	Leonardo Bonucci	1 May 1987 (aged 25)	20	2	(Italian Football Federation) Juventus
20	FW	Sebastian Giovinco	26 January 1987 (aged 25)	10	0	(Italian Football Federation) Parma
21	MF	Andrea Pirlo	19 May 1979 (aged 33)	89	10	(Italian Football Federation) Juventus
22	MF	Alessandro Diamanti	2 May 1983 (aged 29)	4	0	(Italian Football Federation) Bologna
23	MF	Antonio Nocerino	9 April 1985 (aged 27)	13	0	(Italian Football Federation) Milan

=== Republic of Ireland ===
Manager: (Italy) Giovanni Trapattoni

On 7 May 2012, Giovanni Trapattoni announced his 23-man squad list for Euro 2012, along with a five-man stand-by list. Keith Fahey withdrew with a groin injury on 26 May and was replaced by Paul Green. On 29 May 2012 Kevin Foley was replaced by Paul McShane. The Ireland team was the only squad at the tournament to consist entirely of players from foreign leagues.

No.	Pos.	Player	Date of birth (age)	Caps	Goals	Club
1	GK	Shay Given	20 April 1976 (aged 36)	125	0	(The Football Association) Aston Villa
2	DF	Sean St Ledger	28 December 1984 (aged 27)	30	3	(The Football Association) Leicester City
3	DF	Stephen Ward	20 August 1985 (aged 26)	15	2	(The Football Association) Wolverhampton Wanderers
4	DF	John O'Shea	30 April 1981 (aged 31)	79	1	(The Football Association) Sunderland
5	DF	Richard Dunne	21 September 1979 (aged 32)	76	8	(The Football Association) Aston Villa
6	MF	Glenn Whelan	13 January 1984 (aged 28)	42	2	(The Football Association) Stoke City
7	MF	Aiden McGeady	4 April 1986 (aged 26)	52	2	(Russian Football Union) Spartak Moscow
8	MF	Keith Andrews	13 September 1980 (aged 31)	32	3	(The Football Association) West Bromwich Albion
9	FW	Kevin Doyle	18 September 1983 (aged 28)	50	10	(The Football Association) Wolverhampton Wanderers
10	FW	Robbie Keane (captain)	8 July 1980 (aged 31)	120	53	(United States Soccer Federation) LA Galaxy
11	MF	Damien Duff	2 March 1979 (aged 33)	100	8	(The Football Association) Fulham
12	DF	Stephen Kelly	6 September 1983 (aged 28)	30	0	(The Football Association) Fulham
13	DF	Paul McShane	6 January 1986 (aged 26)	27	0	(The Football Association) Hull City
14	FW	Jonathan Walters	20 September 1983 (aged 28)	10	1	(The Football Association) Stoke City
15	MF	Darron Gibson	25 October 1987 (aged 24)	19	1	(The Football Association) Everton
16	GK	Keiren Westwood	23 October 1984 (aged 27)	10	0	(The Football Association) Sunderland
17	MF	Stephen Hunt	1 August 1981 (aged 30)	39	1	(The Football Association) Wolverhampton Wanderers
18	DF	Darren O'Dea	4 February 1987 (aged 25)	14	0	(Scottish Football Association) Celtic
19	FW	Shane Long	22 January 1987 (aged 25)	27	7	(The Football Association) West Bromwich Albion
20	FW	Simon Cox	28 April 1987 (aged 25)	15	3	(The Football Association) West Bromwich Albion
21	MF	Paul Green	10 April 1983 (aged 29)	12	1	(The Football Association) Derby County
22	MF	James McClean	22 April 1989 (aged 23)	3	0	(The Football Association) Sunderland
23	GK	David Forde	20 December 1979 (aged 32)	2	0	(The Football Association) Millwall

=== Croatia ===
Manager: Slaven Bilić

On 10 May 2012, a provisional list of 27 players was announced. On 29 May, the final 23-man squad was announced. On 4 June 2012, Ivica Olić was ruled out with an injury and was replaced by Nikola Kalinić. On 7 June 2012, Ivo Iličević was ruled out with an injury and was replaced by Šime Vrsaljko.

No.	Pos.	Player	Date of birth (age)	Caps	Goals	Club
1	GK	Stipe Pletikosa	8 January 1979 (aged 33)	94	0	(Russian Football Union) Rostov
2	DF	Ivan Strinić	17 July 1987 (aged 24)	20	0	(Ukrainian Association of Football) Dnipro Dnipropetrovsk
3	DF	Josip Šimunić	18 February 1978 (aged 34)	95	3	(Croatian Football Federation) Dinamo Zagreb
4	DF	Jurica Buljat	12 September 1986 (aged 25)	2	0	(Israel Football Association) Maccabi Haifa
5	DF	Vedran Ćorluka	5 February 1986 (aged 26)	57	3	(German Football Association) Bayer Leverkusen
6	MF	Danijel Pranjić	2 December 1981 (aged 30)	45	0	(German Football Association) Bayern Munich
7	MF	Ivan Rakitić	10 March 1988 (aged 24)	44	8	(Royal Spanish Football Federation) Sevilla
8	MF	Ognjen Vukojević	20 December 1983 (aged 28)	42	4	(Ukrainian Association of Football) Dynamo Kyiv
9	FW	Nikica Jelavić	27 August 1985 (aged 26)	22	3	(The Football Association) Everton
10	MF	Luka Modrić	9 September 1985 (aged 26)	57	8	(The Football Association) Tottenham Hotspur
11	DF	Darijo Srna (captain)	1 May 1982 (aged 30)	94	19	(Ukrainian Association of Football) Shakhtar Donetsk
12	GK	Ivan Kelava	20 February 1988 (aged 24)	0	0	(Croatian Football Federation) Dinamo Zagreb
13	DF	Gordon Schildenfeld	18 March 1985 (aged 27)	15	0	(German Football Association) Eintracht Frankfurt
14	MF	Milan Badelj	25 February 1989 (aged 23)	4	1	(Croatian Football Federation) Dinamo Zagreb
15	DF	Šime Vrsaljko	10 January 1992 (aged 20)	4	0	(Croatian Football Federation) Dinamo Zagreb
16	MF	Tomislav Dujmović	26 February 1981 (aged 31)	19	0	(Royal Spanish Football Federation) Zaragoza
17	FW	Mario Mandžukić	21 May 1986 (aged 26)	32	8	(German Football Association) VfL Wolfsburg
18	FW	Nikola Kalinić	5 January 1988 (aged 24)	13	5	(Ukrainian Association of Football) Dnipro Dnipropetrovsk
19	MF	Niko Kranjčar	13 August 1984 (aged 27)	73	15	(The Football Association) Tottenham Hotspur
20	MF	Ivan Perišić	2 February 1989 (aged 23)	13	0	(German Football Association) Borussia Dortmund
21	DF	Domagoj Vida	29 April 1989 (aged 23)	11	0	(Croatian Football Federation) Dinamo Zagreb
22	FW	Eduardo	25 February 1983 (aged 29)	50	23	(Ukrainian Association of Football) Shakhtar Donetsk
23	GK	Danijel Subašić	27 October 1984 (aged 27)	4	0	(French Football Federation) Monaco

== Group D ==
=== Ukraine ===
Manager: Oleg Blokhin

On 8 May 2012 Blokhin named a provisional list of 26 players for the tournament. On 29 May 2012 Blokhin announced the final squad for the tournament.

No.	Pos.	Player	Date of birth (age)	Caps	Goals	Club
1	GK	Maksym Koval	9 December 1992 (aged 19)	1	0	(Ukrainian Association of Football) Dynamo Kyiv
2	DF	Yevhen Selin	9 May 1988 (aged 24)	9	1	(Ukrainian Association of Football) Vorskla Poltava
3	DF	Yevhen Khacheridi	28 July 1987 (aged 24)	14	0	(Ukrainian Association of Football) Dynamo Kyiv
4	MF	Anatoliy Tymoshchuk	30 March 1979 (aged 33)	119	4	(German Football Association) Bayern Munich
5	DF	Oleksandr Kucher	22 October 1982 (aged 29)	29	1	(Ukrainian Association of Football) Shakhtar Donetsk
6	MF	Denys Harmash	19 April 1990 (aged 22)	6	0	(Ukrainian Association of Football) Dynamo Kyiv
7	FW	Andriy Shevchenko (captain)	29 September 1976 (aged 35)	111	48	(Ukrainian Association of Football) Dynamo Kyiv
8	MF	Oleksandr Aliyev	3 February 1985 (aged 27)	28	6	(Ukrainian Association of Football) Dynamo Kyiv
9	MF	Oleh Husiev	25 April 1983 (aged 29)	75	12	(Ukrainian Association of Football) Dynamo Kyiv
10	FW	Andriy Voronin	21 July 1979 (aged 32)	74	8	(Russian Football Union) Dynamo Moscow
11	FW	Andriy Yarmolenko	23 October 1989 (aged 22)	23	8	(Ukrainian Association of Football) Dynamo Kyiv
12	GK	Andriy Pyatov	28 June 1984 (aged 27)	29	0	(Ukrainian Association of Football) Shakhtar Donetsk
13	DF	Vyacheslav Shevchuk	13 May 1979 (aged 33)	21	0	(Ukrainian Association of Football) Shakhtar Donetsk
14	MF	Ruslan Rotan	29 October 1981 (aged 30)	59	6	(Ukrainian Association of Football) Dnipro Dnipropetrovsk
15	FW	Artem Milevskyi	12 January 1985 (aged 27)	49	8	(Ukrainian Association of Football) Dynamo Kyiv
16	FW	Yevhen Seleznyov	20 July 1985 (aged 26)	29	5	(Ukrainian Association of Football) Shakhtar Donetsk
17	DF	Taras Mykhalyk	28 October 1983 (aged 28)	29	0	(Ukrainian Association of Football) Dynamo Kyiv
18	MF	Serhiy Nazarenko	16 February 1980 (aged 32)	53	12	(Ukrainian Association of Football) Tavriya Simferopol
19	MF	Yevhen Konoplyanka	29 September 1989 (aged 22)	22	5	(Ukrainian Association of Football) Dnipro Dnipropetrovsk
20	DF	Yaroslav Rakitskyi	3 August 1989 (aged 22)	18	3	(Ukrainian Association of Football) Shakhtar Donetsk
21	DF	Bohdan Butko	13 January 1991 (aged 21)	11	0	(Ukrainian Association of Football) Illichivets Mariupol
22	FW	Marko Dević	27 October 1983 (aged 28)	24	2	(Ukrainian Association of Football) Metalist Kharkiv
23	GK	Oleksandr Horyainov	29 June 1975 (aged 36)	2	0	(Ukrainian Association of Football) Metalist Kharkiv

=== Sweden ===
Manager: Erik Hamrén

Erik Hamrén announced Sweden's 23-man squad on 14 May 2012.

No.	Pos.	Player	Date of birth (age)	Caps	Goals	Club
1	GK	Andreas Isaksson	3 October 1981 (aged 30)	93	0	(Royal Dutch Football Association) PSV Eindhoven
2	DF	Mikael Lustig	13 December 1986 (aged 25)	24	1	(Scottish Football Association) Celtic
3	DF	Olof Mellberg	3 September 1977 (aged 34)	114	7	(Hellenic Football Federation) Olympiacos
4	DF	Andreas Granqvist	16 April 1985 (aged 27)	18	2	(Italian Football Federation) Genoa
5	DF	Martin Olsson	17 May 1988 (aged 24)	9	4	(The Football Association) Blackburn Rovers
6	MF	Rasmus Elm	17 March 1988 (aged 24)	24	1	(Royal Dutch Football Association) AZ
7	MF	Sebastian Larsson	6 June 1985 (aged 27)	41	5	(The Football Association) Sunderland
8	MF	Anders Svensson	17 July 1976 (aged 35)	127	18	(Swedish Football Association) Elfsborg
9	MF	Kim Källström	24 August 1982 (aged 29)	92	16	(French Football Federation) Lyon
10	FW	Zlatan Ibrahimović (captain)	3 October 1981 (aged 30)	77	31	(Italian Football Federation) Milan
11	FW	Johan Elmander	27 May 1981 (aged 31)	63	16	(Turkish Football Federation) Galatasaray
12	GK	Johan Wiland	24 January 1981 (aged 31)	8	0	(Danish Football Association) Copenhagen
13	DF	Jonas Olsson	10 March 1983 (aged 29)	8	0	(The Football Association) West Bromwich Albion
14	FW	Tobias Hysén	9 March 1982 (aged 30)	23	7	(Swedish Football Association) IFK Göteborg
15	DF	Mikael Antonsson	31 May 1981 (aged 31)	5	0	(Italian Football Federation) Bologna
16	MF	Pontus Wernbloom	25 June 1986 (aged 25)	23	2	(Russian Football Union) CSKA Moscow
17	DF	Behrang Safari	9 February 1985 (aged 27)	24	0	(Royal Belgian Football Association) Anderlecht
18	MF	Samuel Holmén	28 June 1984 (aged 27)	27	2	(Turkish Football Federation) İstanbul B.B.
19	MF	Emir Bajrami	7 March 1988 (aged 24)	16	2	(Royal Dutch Football Association) Twente
20	FW	Ola Toivonen	3 July 1986 (aged 25)	24	6	(Royal Dutch Football Association) PSV Eindhoven
21	MF	Christian Wilhelmsson	8 December 1979 (aged 32)	74	9	(Saudi Arabian Football Federation) Al Hilal
22	FW	Markus Rosenberg	27 September 1982 (aged 29)	31	6	(German Football Association) Werder Bremen
23	GK	Pär Hansson	22 June 1986 (aged 25)	2	0	(Swedish Football Association) Helsingborg

=== England ===
Manager: Roy Hodgson

Roy Hodgson announced England's 23-man squad on 16 May 2012, along with a five-man stand-by list. The England team is the only squad to consist entirely of players from their domestic league. On 25 May, John Ruddy was ruled out with a broken finger; Jack Butland was called up as his replacement. On 28 May, Gareth Barry was ruled out with a groin injury, being replaced by Phil Jagielka. On 31 May, Frank Lampard was ruled out with a thigh injury and was replaced by Jordan Henderson. On 3 June, Gary Cahill was ruled out with a double fracture of his jaw and Martin Kelly was called up as his replacement.

No.	Pos.	Player	Date of birth (age)	Caps	Goals	Club
1	GK	Joe Hart	19 April 1987 (aged 25)	22	0	(The Football Association) Manchester City
2	DF	Glen Johnson	23 August 1984 (aged 27)	40	1	(The Football Association) Liverpool
3	DF	Ashley Cole	20 December 1980 (aged 31)	98	0	(The Football Association) Chelsea
4	MF	Steven Gerrard (captain)	30 May 1980 (aged 32)	96	19	(The Football Association) Liverpool
5	DF	Martin Kelly	27 April 1990 (aged 22)	1	0	(The Football Association) Liverpool
6	DF	John Terry	7 December 1980 (aged 31)	77	6	(The Football Association) Chelsea
7	FW	Theo Walcott	16 March 1989 (aged 23)	28	4	(The Football Association) Arsenal
8	MF	Jordan Henderson	17 June 1990 (aged 21)	5	0	(The Football Association) Liverpool
9	FW	Andy Carroll	6 January 1989 (aged 23)	7	2	(The Football Association) Liverpool
10	FW	Wayne Rooney	24 October 1985 (aged 26)	76	29	(The Football Association) Manchester United
11	MF	Ashley Young	9 July 1985 (aged 26)	25	6	(The Football Association) Manchester United
12	DF	Leighton Baines	11 December 1984 (aged 27)	8	0	(The Football Association) Everton
13	GK	Robert Green	18 January 1980 (aged 32)	12	0	(The Football Association) West Ham United
14	DF	Phil Jones	21 February 1992 (aged 20)	5	0	(The Football Association) Manchester United
15	DF	Joleon Lescott	16 August 1982 (aged 29)	20	1	(The Football Association) Manchester City
16	MF	James Milner	4 January 1986 (aged 26)	30	0	(The Football Association) Manchester City
17	MF	Scott Parker	13 October 1980 (aged 31)	17	0	(The Football Association) Tottenham Hotspur
18	DF	Phil Jagielka	17 August 1982 (aged 29)	12	0	(The Football Association) Everton
19	MF	Stewart Downing	22 July 1984 (aged 27)	34	0	(The Football Association) Liverpool
20	MF	Alex Oxlade-Chamberlain	15 August 1993 (aged 18)	5	0	(The Football Association) Arsenal
21	FW	Jermain Defoe	7 October 1982 (aged 29)	48	15	(The Football Association) Tottenham Hotspur
22	FW	Danny Welbeck	26 November 1990 (aged 21)	9	2	(The Football Association) Manchester United
23	GK	Jack Butland	10 March 1993 (aged 19)	0	0	(The Football Association) Birmingham City

=== France ===
Manager: Laurent Blanc

Blanc named his first shortlist on 9 May 2012, consisting of 12 players playing abroad. On 15 May 2012 second shortlist of 15 France-based players was announced, while on the same day Tottenham defender Younès Kaboul was ruled out of the tournament with a knee injury, leaving Blanc with a 26-man squad. On 29 May 2012, Blanc announced his final 23-man squad.

No.	Pos.	Player	Date of birth (age)	Caps	Goals	Club
1	GK	Hugo Lloris (captain)	26 December 1986 (aged 25)	37	0	(French Football Federation) Lyon
2	DF	Mathieu Debuchy	28 July 1985 (aged 26)	9	1	(French Football Federation) Lille
3	DF	Patrice Evra	15 May 1981 (aged 31)	42	0	(The Football Association) Manchester United
4	DF	Adil Rami	27 December 1985 (aged 26)	24	1	(Royal Spanish Football Federation) Valencia
5	DF	Philippe Mexès	30 March 1982 (aged 30)	29	1	(Italian Football Federation) Milan
6	MF	Yohan Cabaye	14 January 1986 (aged 26)	16	1	(The Football Association) Newcastle United
7	MF	Franck Ribéry	7 April 1983 (aged 29)	64	10	(German Football Association) Bayern Munich
8	MF	Mathieu Valbuena	28 September 1984 (aged 27)	12	2	(French Football Federation) Marseille
9	FW	Olivier Giroud	30 September 1986 (aged 25)	9	1	(French Football Federation) Montpellier
10	FW	Karim Benzema	19 December 1987 (aged 24)	49	15	(Royal Spanish Football Federation) Real Madrid
11	MF	Samir Nasri	27 June 1987 (aged 24)	35	4	(The Football Association) Manchester City
12	MF	Blaise Matuidi	9 April 1987 (aged 25)	4	0	(French Football Federation) Paris Saint-Germain
13	DF	Anthony Réveillère	10 November 1979 (aged 32)	18	1	(French Football Federation) Lyon
14	MF	Jérémy Ménez	7 May 1987 (aged 25)	16	2	(French Football Federation) Paris Saint-Germain
15	MF	Florent Malouda	13 June 1980 (aged 31)	80	9	(The Football Association) Chelsea
16	GK	Steve Mandanda	28 March 1985 (aged 27)	15	0	(French Football Federation) Marseille
17	MF	Yann M'Vila	29 June 1990 (aged 21)	22	1	(French Football Federation) Rennes
18	MF	Alou Diarra	15 July 1981 (aged 30)	44	0	(French Football Federation) Marseille
19	MF	Marvin Martin	10 January 1988 (aged 24)	14	2	(French Football Federation) Sochaux
20	MF	Hatem Ben Arfa	7 March 1987 (aged 25)	13	2	(The Football Association) Newcastle United
21	DF	Laurent Koscielny	10 September 1985 (aged 26)	4	0	(The Football Association) Arsenal
22	DF	Gaël Clichy	26 July 1985 (aged 26)	15	0	(The Football Association) Manchester City
23	GK	Cédric Carrasso	30 December 1981 (aged 30)	1	0	(French Football Federation) Bordeaux

== Statistics ==
- Republic of Ireland's Robbie Keane (LA Galaxy) and Sweden's Christian Wilhelmsson (Al Hilal) were the only two players at the tournament not playing in a UEFA league.
- The youngest player at the tournament was Jetro Willems of the Netherlands, born on 30 March 1994.
- The oldest player at the tournament was Greece goalkeeper Kostas Chalkias, born on 30 May 1974.
- The oldest outfield player at the tournament was Greece striker Nikos Liberopoulos, born on 4 August 1975.
- The youngest squad at the tournament was Germany, with an average age of 24.5 years.
- The oldest squad at the tournament was Russia, with an average age of 28.3 years.
- The tournament featured twelve players with more than 100 international caps for their country:
  - 129 caps – Iker Casillas (Spain)
  - 125 caps – Anders Svensson (Sweden)
  - 122 caps – Shay Given (Republic of Ireland)
  - 120 caps – Giorgos Karagounis (Greece)
  - 115 caps – Robbie Keane (Republic of Ireland)
  - 114 caps – Miroslav Klose (Germany)
  - 114 caps – Olof Mellberg (Sweden)
  - 114 caps – Dennis Rommedahl (Denmark)
  - 114 caps – Anatoliy Tymoshchuk (Ukraine)
  - 113 caps – Gianluigi Buffon (Italy)
  - 108 caps – Xavi (Spain)
  - 105 caps – Andriy Shevchenko (Ukraine)
- The squads included five players who still had not made their debut at full international level prior to the start of the tournament. Of the five, only Giaccherini made his debut in the tournament. The five players were:
  - Jack Butland (England)
  - Emanuele Giaccherini (Italy)
  - Vladimir Granat (Russia)
  - Ivan Kelava (Croatia)
  - Kasper Schmeichel (Denmark)

== Player representation ==
=== By club ===
Players	Clubs
12	(Germany) Bayern Munich
11	(Spain) Real Madrid
10	(Ukraine) Dynamo Kyiv
9	(England) Liverpool (England) Arsenal
8	(Spain) Barcelona (Germany) Borussia Dortmund (England) Manchester City (Ukraine) Shakhtar Donetsk
7	(England) Chelsea (England) Manchester United (Russia) CSKA Moscow (Russia) Zenit Saint Petersburg (Italy) Juventus
6	(Italy) Milan (Greece) Olympiacos (Netherlands) PSV Eindhoven (Czech Republic) Viktoria Plzeň
5	(Croatia) Dinamo Zagreb (Ukraine) Dnipro Dnipropetrovsk (Russia) Dynamo Moscow (England) Everton (England) Tottenham Hotspur
4	(Germany) Bayer Leverkusen (Germany) Werder Bremen (Scotland) Celtic (France) Evian (France) Paris Saint-Germain (Greece) PAOK (Italy) Roma (Portugal) Sporting CP (England) Sunderland (England) West Bromwich Albion
3	(Turkey) Beşiktaş (France) Bordeaux (France) Lyon (France) Marseille (Portugal) Braga (Portugal) Porto (England) Fulham (England) Newcastle United (England) Wolverhampton Wanderers (Poland) Lech Poznań (Denmark) Nordsjælland (Greece) Panathinaikos (Germany) Schalke 04 (Spain) Sevilla (Spain) Valencia (Russia) Spartak Moscow
2	(Greece) AEK Athens (Netherlands) Ajax (Netherlands) AZ (Netherlands) Twente (Belgium) Anderlecht (England) Aston Villa (England) Leicester City (England) Stoke City (Spain) Athletic Bilbao (Spain) Atlético Madrid (Spain) Málaga (Spain) Zaragoza (Portugal) Benfica (Italy) Bologna (Italy) Genoa (Italy) Napoli (Italy) Palermo (Denmark) Brøndby (Denmark) Copenhagen (Turkey) Galatasaray (Turkey) Trabzonspor (Germany) Hannover 96 (Germany) VfB Stuttgart (Germany) VfL Wolfsburg (Poland) Legia Warsaw (Russia) Lokomotiv Moscow (Ukraine) Metalist Kharkiv (France) Monaco (France) Sochaux
1	(Saudi Arabia) Al-Hilal (Cyprus) Anorthosis Famagusta (Russia) Anzhi Makhachkala (Russia) Rostov (Russia) Rubin Kazan (Russia) Terek Grozny (Greece) Aris (Greece) Atromitos (France) Auxerre (France) Lille (France) Montpellier (France) Rennes (England) Birmingham City (England) Blackburn Rovers (England) Derby County (England) Hull City (England) Millwall (England) Swansea City (England) West Ham United (Germany) Borussia Mönchengladbach (Germany) Eintracht Frankfurt (Germany) Fortuna Düsseldorf (Germany) Hamburger SV (Germany) Hertha BSC (Germany) 1. FC Kaiserslautern (Germany) 1. FC Köln (Germany) Mainz 05 (Germany) 1. FC Nürnberg (Romania) CFR Cluj (Belgium) Club Brugge (Sweden) Elfsborg (Sweden) IFK Göteborg (Sweden) Helsingborg (Turkey) İstanbul B.B. (Turkey) Samsunspor (Turkey) Sivasspor (Netherlands) Feyenoord (Netherlands) NEC (Netherlands) Groningen (Netherlands) Heerenveen (Italy) Fiorentina (Italy) Inter Milan (Italy) Lazio (Italy) Parma (Italy) Torino (Italy) Udinese (Ukraine) Illichivets Mariupol (Ukraine) Tavriya Simferopol (Ukraine) Vorskla Poltava (Czech Republic) Jablonec (Czech Republic) Slovan Liberec (Poland) Jagiellonia Białystok (United States) LA Galaxy (Israel) Maccabi Haifa (Denmark) Midtjylland (Switzerland) Young Boys

=== By club nationality ===
Nations in bold were represented by their national teams in the tournament

Players	Clubs
78	**England**
45	**Germany**
33	**Spain**
31	**Italy**
29	**Russia**
28	**Ukraine**
25	**France**
17	**Greece**
16	**Netherlands**
12	**Portugal**
10	Turkey
8	**Czech Republic**; **Denmark**
6	**Poland**
5	**Croatia**
4	Scotland
3	Belgium; **Sweden**
1	Cyprus; Israel; Romania; Saudi Arabia; Switzerland; United States
