= Michał Rostkowski =

Polish footballer

Personal information
- Full name: Michał Rostkowski
- Date of birth: 10 August 2000 (age 26)
- Place of birth: Ruda Śląska, Poland
- Height: 1.75 m (5 ft 9 in)
- Position: Midfielder

Team information
- Current team: KS Goczałkowice-Zdrój
- Number: 7

Youth career
- 2012–2017: MSPN Górnik Zabrze

Senior career*
Years	Team	Apps	(Gls)
2017	Stadion Śląski Chorzów	1	(0)
2017–2019	ROW 1964 Rybnik	29	(2)
2019–2023	Górnik Zabrze II	57	(15)
2019–2023	Górnik Zabrze	13	(0)
2021–2022	→ Resovia (loan)	7	(0)
2024–	KS Goczałkowice-Zdrój	27	(2)
- * Club domestic league appearances and goals as of 23:31, 3 June 2026 (UTC)

Michał Rostkowski (born 10 August 2000) is a Polish professional footballer who plays as a midfielder for III liga club KS Goczałkowice-Zdrój.

== Honours ==
Górnik Zabrze II

- Polish Cup (Zabrze regionals): 2020–21, 2022–23
