= KS Goczałkowice-Zdrój =

Association football club

- Full name: KS Panattoni Goczałkowice-Zdrój
- Founded: 1960; 66 years ago
- Stadium: Panattoni Arena
- Capacity: 1,500
- Chairman: Ryszard Waliczek
- Manager: Łukasz Piszczek
- League: III liga, group III
- 2025–26: III liga, group III, 6th of 18
- Website: https://ksgoczalkowice.pl

KS Goczałkowice-Zdrój, also known as KS Panattoni Goczałkowice-Zdrój for sponsorship reasons, is a football club located in Goczałkowice-Zdrój, Poland. They compete in the III liga, the fourth tier of the Polish football pyramid. Founded in 1960, they play their home matches at Panattoni Arena, formerly called the Communal Stadium (Stadion Gminny).

== Current squad ==
As of 17 November 2025

Note: Flags indicate national team as defined under FIFA eligibility rules; some limited exceptions apply. Players may hold more than one non-FIFA nationality.

No.	Pos.	Nation	Player
2	MF	POL	Mateusz Bąk
3	MF	POL	Mateusz Gajda
5	DF	POL	Mateusz Grygier
6	DF	POL	Dominik Zięba (captain)
7	MF	POL	Michał Rostkowski
8	DF	POL	Mikołaj Rabczak
9	FW	POL	Michał Fidziukiewicz
10	MF	POL	Filip Żagiel
11	FW	POL	Nikolas Wróblewski
12	GK	ITA	Alessio Valion
13	DF	POL	Damian Maśka
14	MF	POL	Kamil Komandera
15	DF	POL	Kacper Mendrela
16	MF	POL	Mateusz Blacha
17	MF	POL	Remigiusz Flasz
18	MF	POL	Szymon Osipowicz
20	MF	POL	Bartosz Maroszek
21	MF	POL	Sergiusz Wesołek

No.	Pos.	Nation	Player
22	GK	POL	Kacper Wieczorkiewicz
23	MF	POL	Michał Płonka
24	FW	POL	Bartłomiej Piworowicz
25	MF	POL	Tomasz Dzida
27	MF	POL	Kacper Będzieszak
28	MF	POL	Jacek Wuwer
29	MF	POL	Mateusz Duda
30	MF	POL	Szymon Habla
32	MF	POL	Adam Piech
33	DF	POL	Kamil Jaromin
34	MF	POL	Mikołaj Przewoźnik
70	FW	POL	Krzysztof Kiklaisz
71	MF	POL	Błażej Grygier
77	MF	POL	Tobiasz Mras (on loan from Wieczysta Kraków)
80	MF	POL	Dorian Orliński
99	MF	POL	Mateusz Bogdański
—	MF	POL	Igor Benesz
—	GK	POL	Wiktor Grygierek

== Notable players ==
=== Łukasz Piszczek ===
The club has gained attention for being the childhood club of the long-term Poland international player Łukasz Piszczek. In April 2021, he agreed to join the club for the 2021–22 season following his departure from Borussia Dortmund, when he retired from professional football. His father is vice-president of LKS Goczałkowice-Zdrój. In May 2021, Piszczek coached the club for one III liga match against Pniówek Pawłowice, although it ended in a 2–1 defeat.

Since 2019, Piszczek has been working to establish the Łukasz Piszczek BVB Academy in Goczałkowice-Zdrój, in partnership with Borussia Dortmund.

== Reserve team ==
The club also operates a reserve team, KS Goczałkowice-Zdrój II.

In the 2024–25 season, the reserves won the Silesian Regional Polish Cup, defeating GKS Katowice's B team 3–0 in the final. This victory qualified them for the central stage of the Polish Cup. In the 2025–26 first round, played on 23 September 2025, the reserves upset II liga side Stal Stalowa Wola 3–1 after extra time at the Panattoni Arena to advance to the round of 32. The reserve side was reinforced by several first-team players, including Łukasz Piszczek and Michał Fidziukiewicz.

In the Round of 32, they were eliminated after a heavy 0–7 defeat at home against Polonia Bytom.

Polish Cup records
Season	Round	Opponent	Result
2025–26	First round	Stal Stalowa Wola (3)	3–1 (a.e.t.)
2025–26	Round of 32	Polonia Bytom (2)	0–7
