= Goczałkowice-Zdrój =

- Village
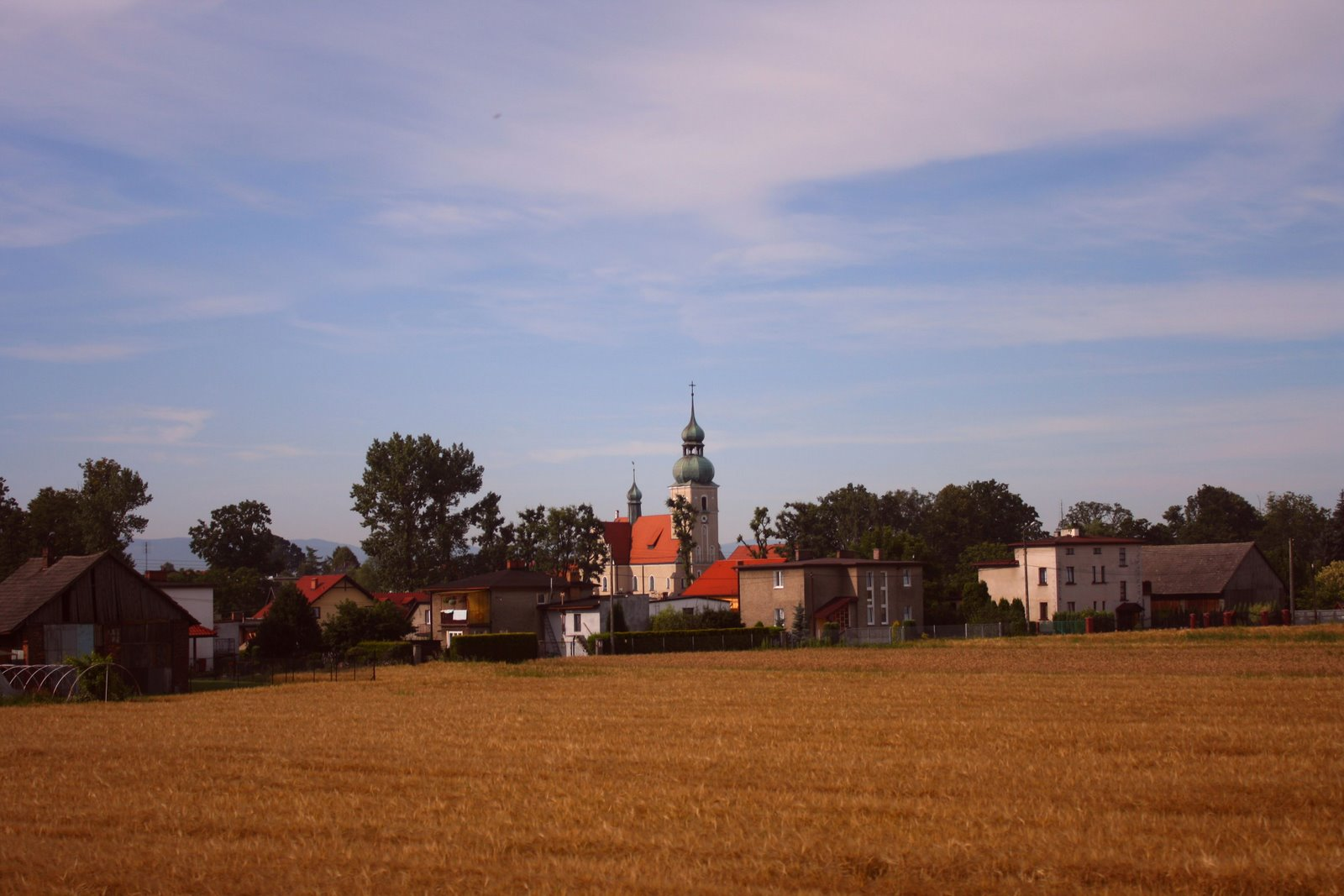
- Goczałkowice-Zdrój

- Coat of arms

- Location within Poland Location within Silesian Voivodeship
- Coordinates: 49°56′N 18°58′E
- Country: Poland
- Voivodeship: Silesian
- County: Pszczyna
- Gmina: Goczałkowice-Zdrój

Population
  - Total: 6,245
- Time zone: UTC+1 (CET)
  - Summer (DST): UTC+2 (CEST)
- Vehicle registration: SPS

Goczałkowice-Zdrój [ɡɔt͡ʂau̯kɔˈvit͡sɛ ˈzdrui̯] (German: Bad Gottschalkowitz) is a village in Pszczyna County, Silesian Voivodeship, in southern Poland. It is the seat of the gmina (administrative district) called Gmina Goczałkowice-Zdrój. It lies approximately 6 kilometres (4 mi) south of Pszczyna and 36 km (22 mi) south of the regional capital Katowice. The gmina covers an area of 48.64 square kilometres (18.8 sq mi), and as of 2006 the population of the village and gmina is 6,263.

Goczałkowice-Zdrój is situated on the Goczałkowice Reservoir and 1 km away from the Vistula river. Goczałkowice-Zdrój is a spa, with about 10,000 bathers each year.

== History ==
In the Middle Ages, the area was part of the territory of the Vistulans tribe, one of the Polish tribes. It became part of the emerging Polish state in the 10th century. As a result of the fragmentation of Poland, it was part of the Seniorate Province from 1138, and the Duchy of Racibórz from 1178. The village was probably founded in the 13th century, and was first mentioned in 1326. According to legend, the name of the village is derived from local Polish knight Goczał, whose descendants took the surname Goczałkowicz, and their seat was called Goczałkowice.

In 1327, it passed under Bohemian (Czech) suzerainty. In 1407, the village became part of the newly formed Duchy of Pszczyna under Duchess Helena Korybutówna, niece of Polish King Władysław II Jagiełło. During the political upheaval caused by Matthias Corvinus the duchy was overtaken in 1480 by Casimir II, Duke of Cieszyn from the Piast dynasty, who sold it in 1517 to the Hungarian magnates of the Thurzó family, forming the Pless state country. In the accompanying sales document issued on 21 February 1517 the village was mentioned as Koczialkowicze. The Kingdom of Bohemia in 1526 became part of the Habsburg monarchy. In the War of the Austrian Succession most of Silesia was conquered by the Kingdom of Prussia, including the village, and in 1871 it became part of the German Empire. The spa was opened in the village in 1862. After World War I, Poland regained independence, Polish insurgents captured the village during the Silesian Uprisings, and then it was officially reintegrated with the reborn Polish state. In 1932, the name of the village was changed to the current Goczałkowice-Zdrój, by adding the word "Zdrój", which is typical for spa towns and villages in Poland.

During the German occupation (World War II), the occupiers converted the spa into a military hospital. The local Polish police chief and another policeman were murdered by the Russians in the Katyn massacre in 1940.

In 1975, the settlement was included within the town limits of Pszczyna as its new district, but was separated again in 1991.

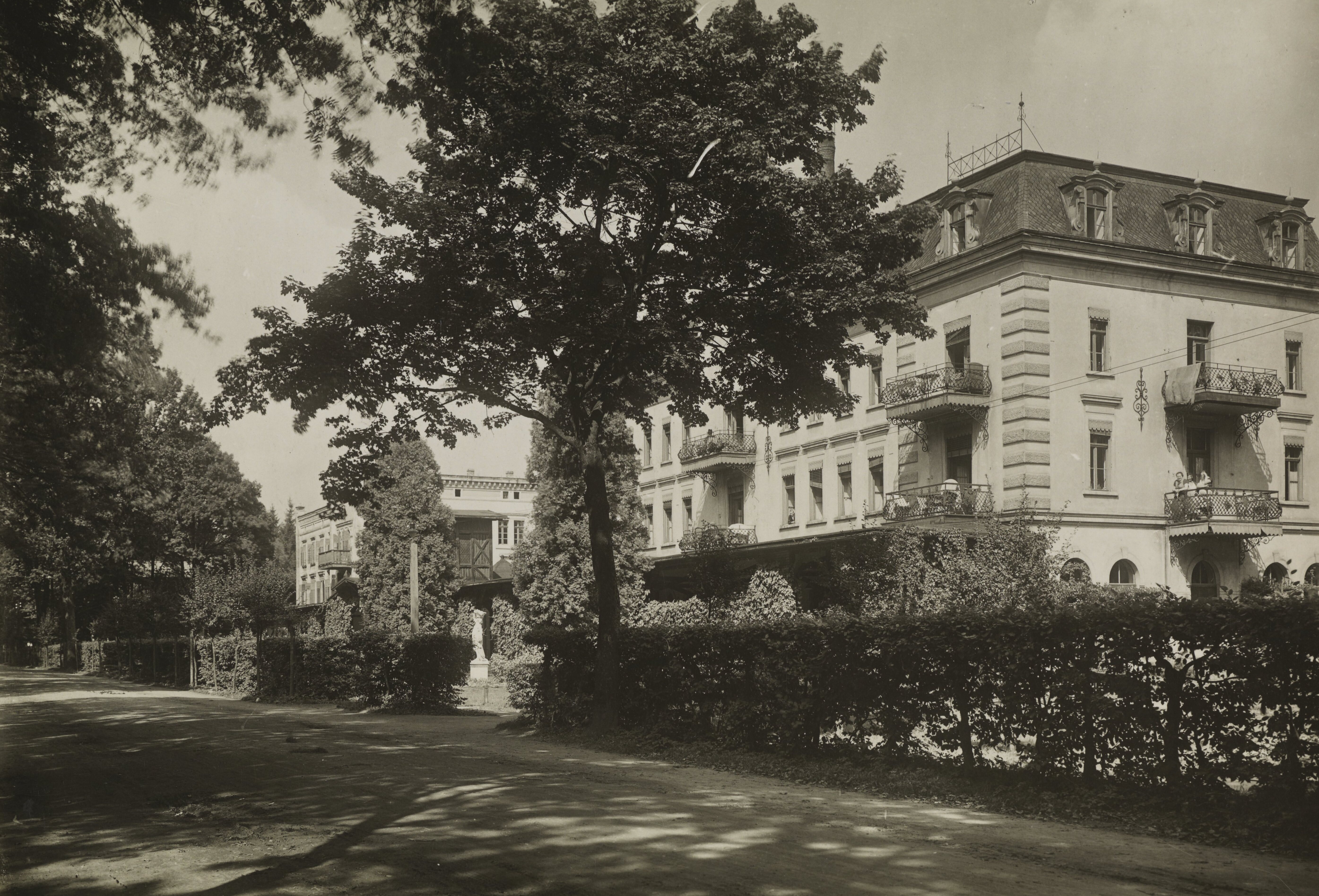
Bathing facility, before 1939

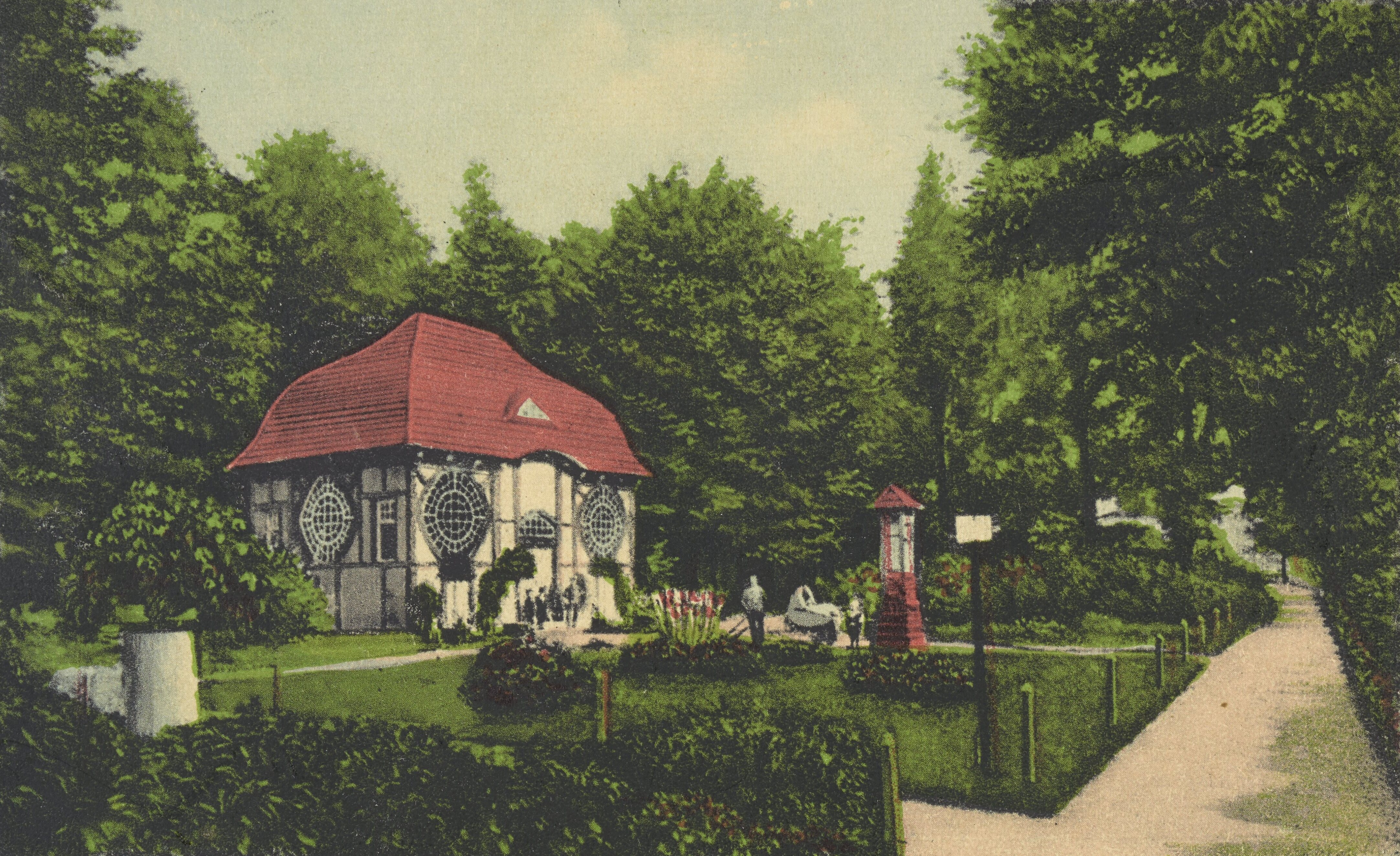
Brine drinking hall, 1931

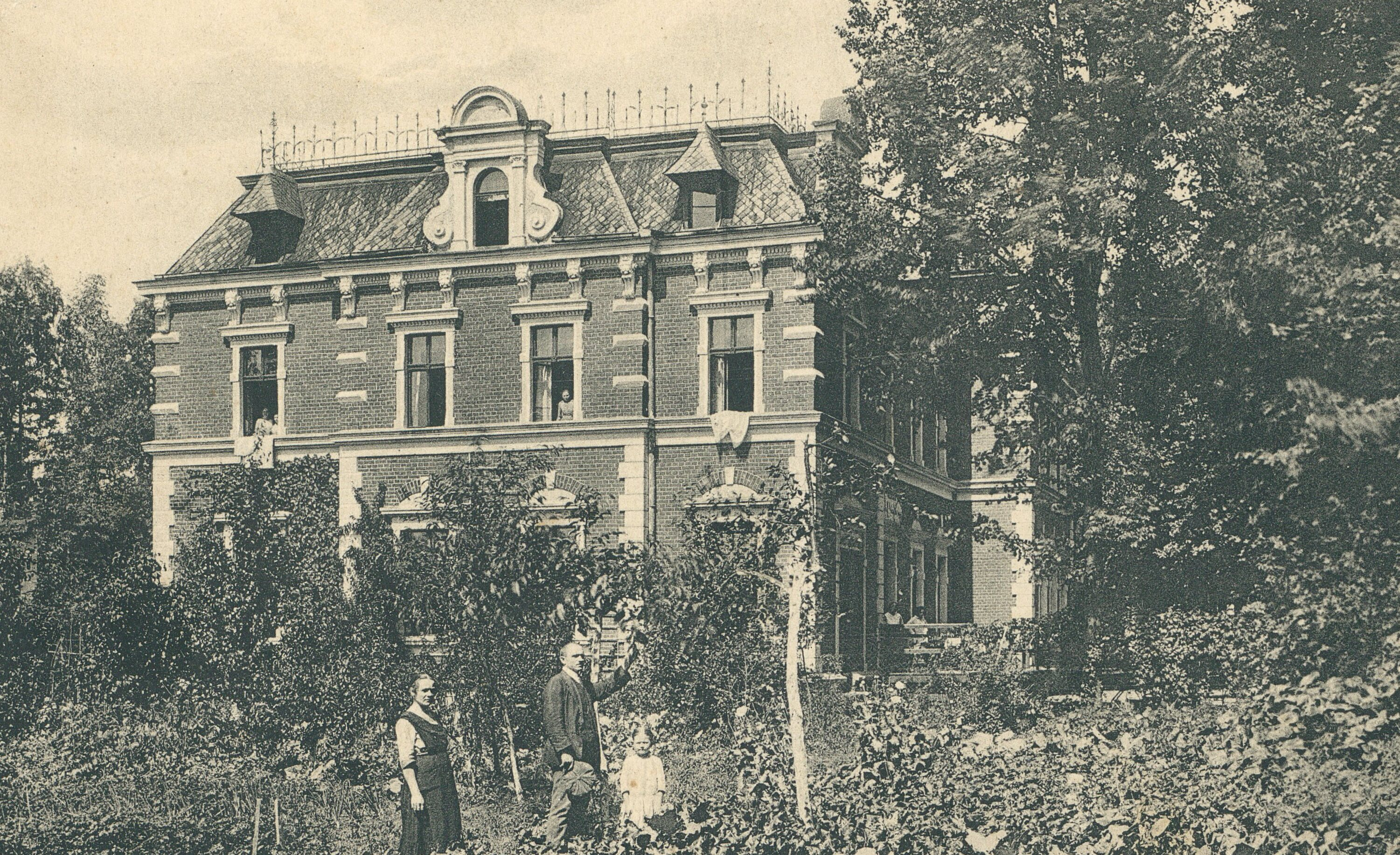
Salt-iodine-bromine baths, after 1906

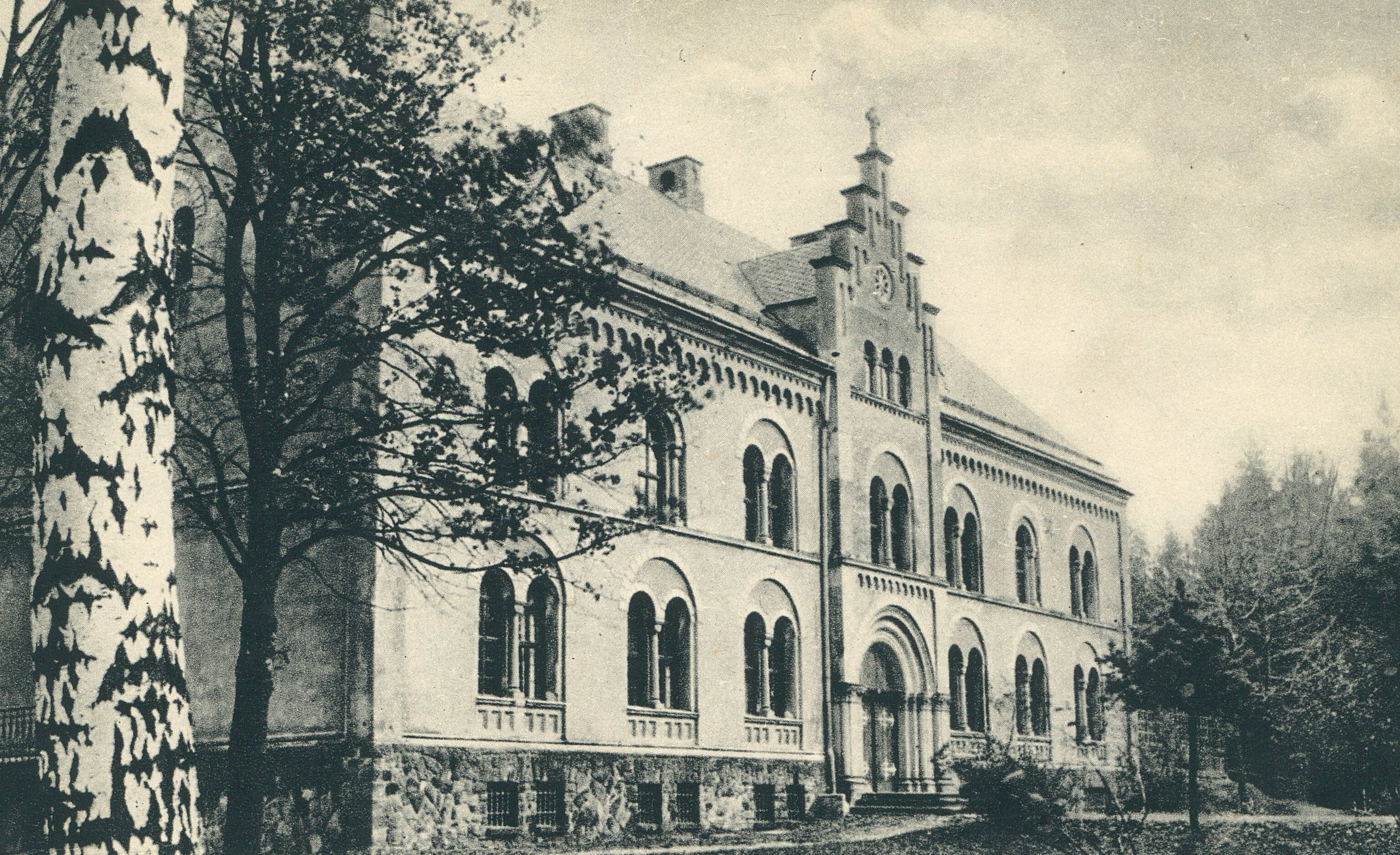
Children's shelter, before 1935

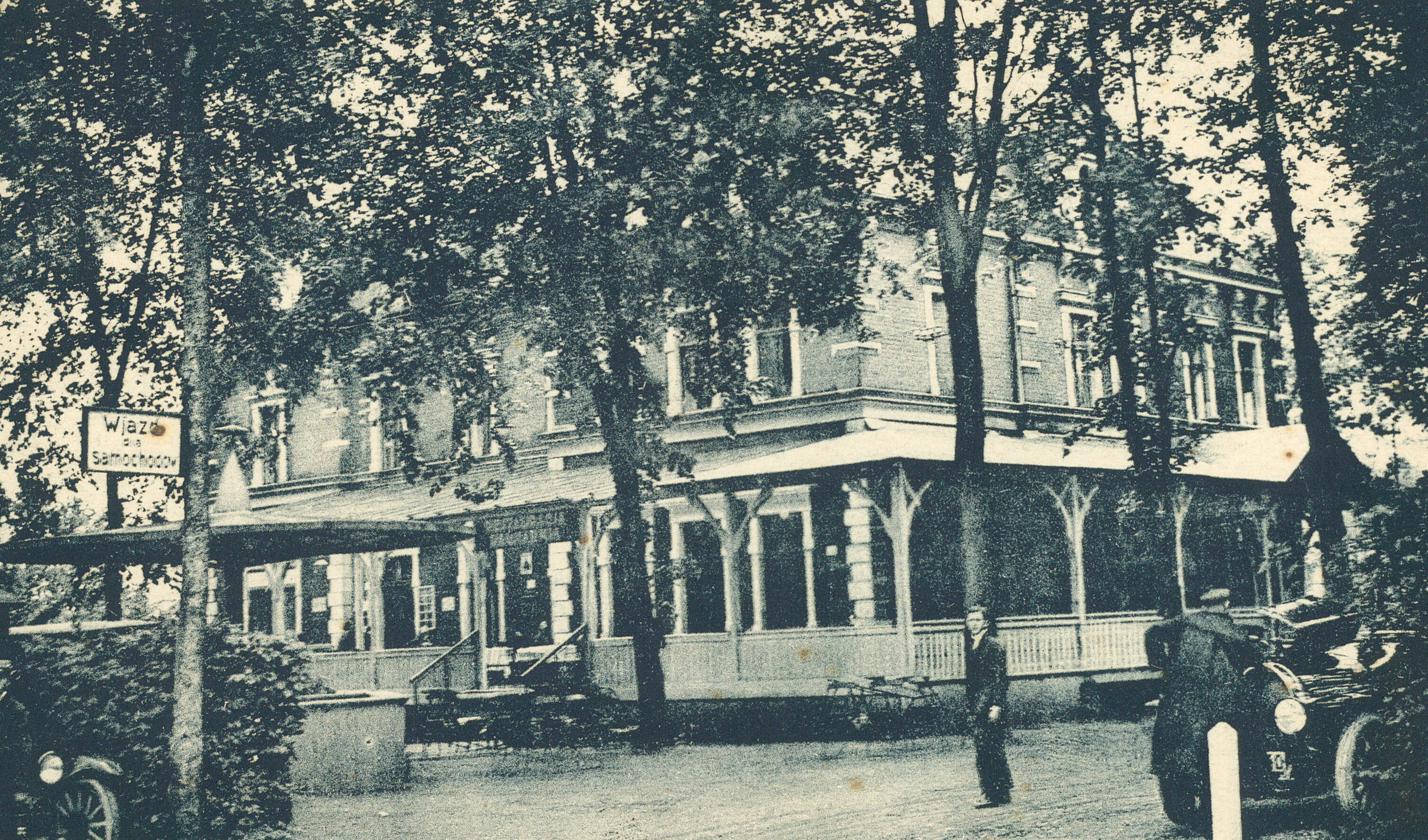
Hotel "President"

== Transport ==
The Polish National road 1 and Railway line 139 run through the village, and there are two railway stations.

== Sports ==
The local football club is LKS Goczałkowice-Zdrój. It competes in the lower leagues. It was the first club of Goczałkowice-Zdrój native, long-term Poland national football team player, Łukasz Piszczek.

The village is home to the only Borussia Dortmund youth academy outside of Germany, founded by and named after its player Łukasz Piszczek.

== Gallery ==
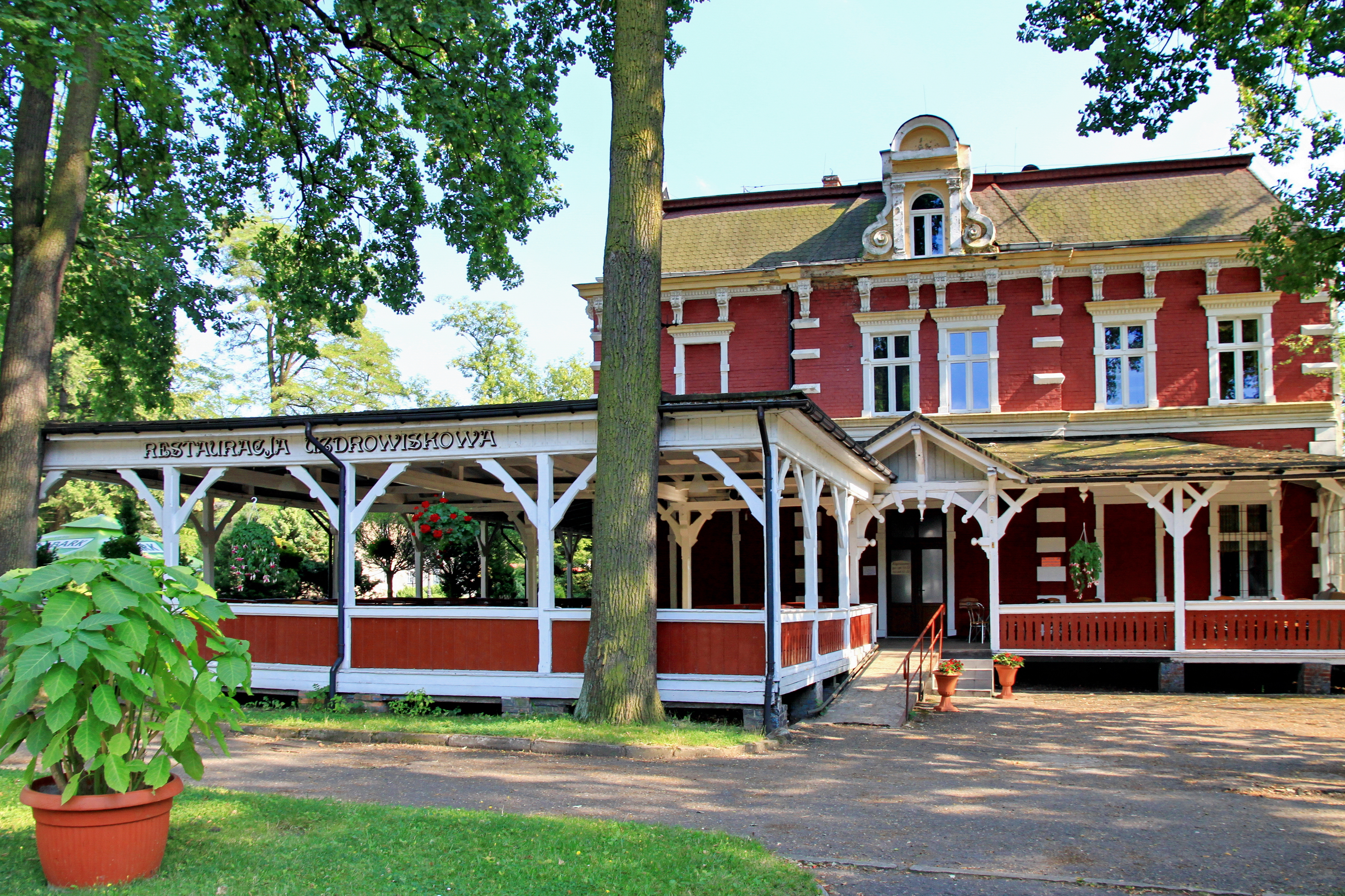
Old spa administration building

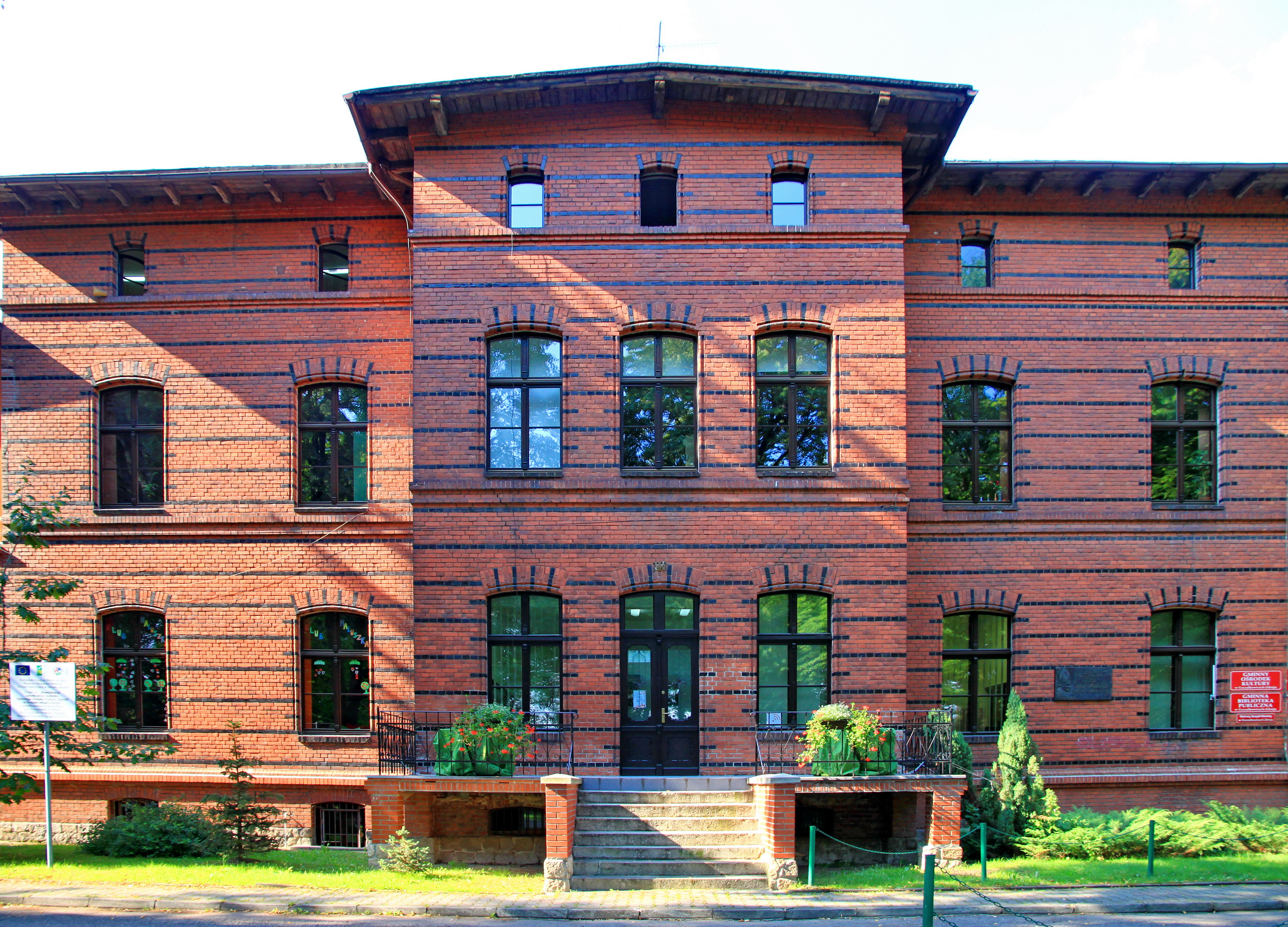
Culture center and public library

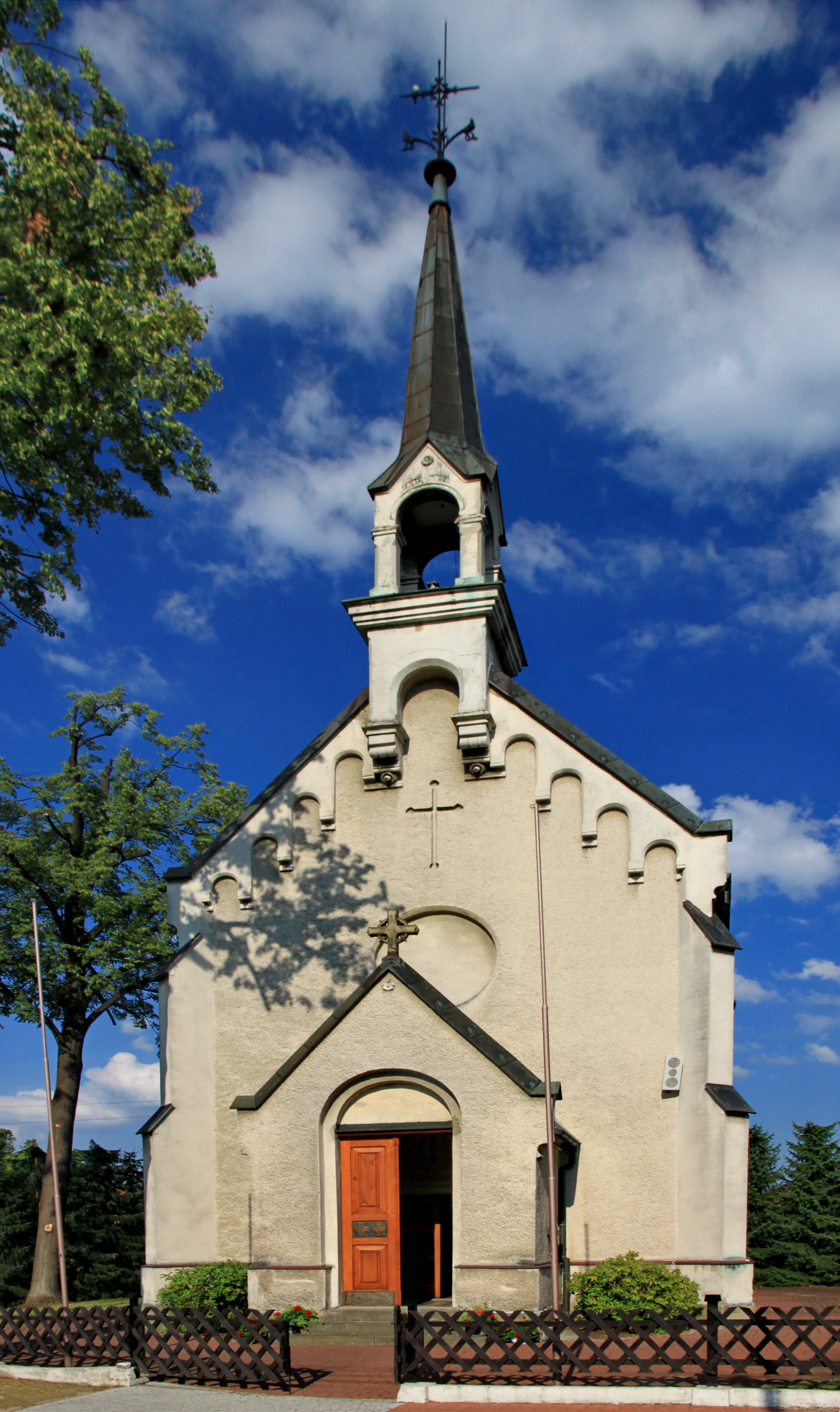
Saint Anne chapel

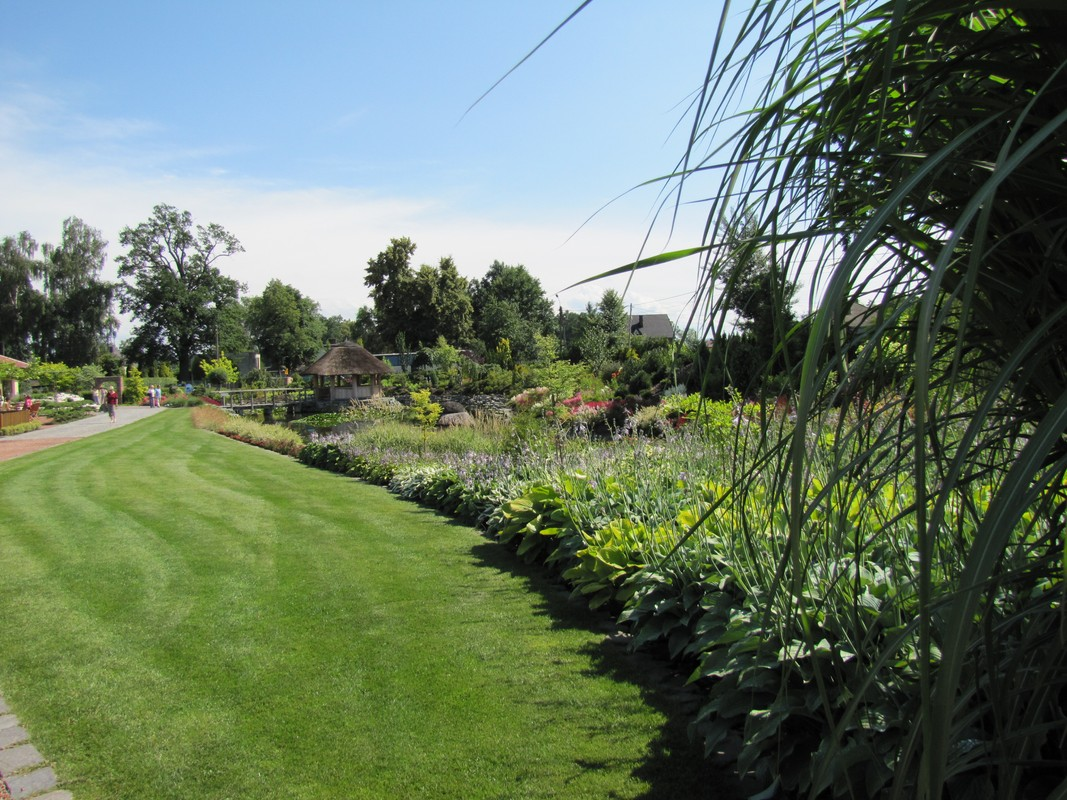
Kapias garden
