= Michał Chałbiński =

Polish footballer

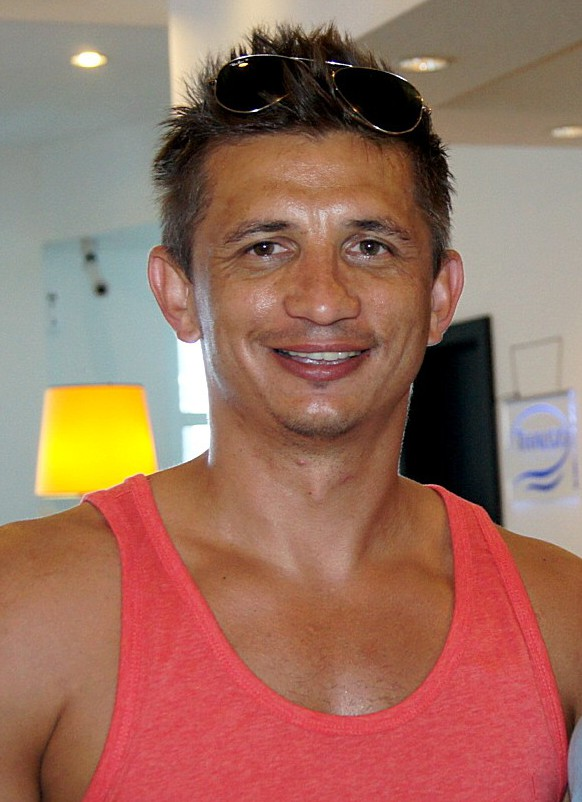

Personal information
- Date of birth: 16 October 1976 (age 50)
- Place of birth: Jastrzębie-Zdrój, Poland
- Height: 1.80 m (5 ft 11 in)
- Position: Striker

Youth career
- GKS Jastrzębie
- Piotrcovia Piotrków Trybunalski

Senior career*
Years	Team	Apps	(Gls)
1994–1996	GKS Jastrzębie		
1996	→ ŁKS Łódź (loan)	0	(0)
1997	GKS Katowice	4	(1)
1997–1998	Górnik Pszów		
1998–1999	Włókniarz Kietrz		
1998	→ RKS Radomsko (loan)		
2000–2003	Odra Wodzisław	91	(30)
2003	SSV Jahn Regensburg	8	(0)
2004–2005	Górnik Zabrze	34	(12)
2005–2009	Zagłębie Lubin	76	(32)
2009–2010	Polonia Warsaw	10	(1)
2010–2011	Piast Gliwice	7	(0)
- * Club domestic league appearances and goals

Michał Chałbiński (born 16 October 1976) is a Polish former professional footballer who played as a striker.

== Career ==
He was released from Piast Gliwice on 30 June 2011.

== Honours ==
Zagłębie Lubin

- Ekstraklasa: 2006–07
- Polish Super Cup: 2007
