= List of Moldova international footballers =

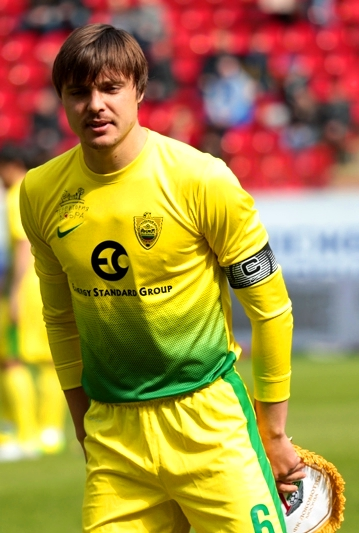
Alexandru Epureanu holds the record for most appearances for Moldova.

This is a list of Moldova international footballers who have played at least 20 matches for the Moldova national football team. There are in total 82 players on the list.

Alexandru Epureanu is the player with the most appearances for Moldova. He made his debut in a 2–0 UEFA Euro 2008 qualifying loss against Norway on 6 September 2006, and has since been a regular in the national team, wearing the captain's armband on several occasions. In September 2019, Epureanu retired from the national team due to a knee injury. However, he returned in August 2020. On 31 March 2021, he made his 100th and last appearance for Moldova in a 2022 FIFA World Cup qualification match against Israel.

Igor Armaș is in second place with 83 appearances, followed by Artur Ioniță with 81 appearances.

Ion Nicolaescu is the all-time top goalscorer of the Moldova national team with 18 goals in 56 matches. He is followed by Serghei Cleșcenco with 11 goals in 69 matches between 1991 and 2006.

Moldova's first ever match was a friendly match against Georgia on 2 July 1991. Five of the players on this list took part in the match, including Radu Rebeja and Serghei Cleșcenco.

Moldova have never qualified for the FIFA World Cup or the UEFA European Championship, so the matches listed below are either qualifying matches for those two tournaments, UEFA Nations League matches, or friendly matches.

== Key ==
Positions key
GK	Goalkeeper
DF	Defender
MF	Midfielder
FW	Forward

- The list is initially ordered by number of appearances, then goals, and then alphabetically by surname.
- Only players with at least 20 appearances in official matches are listed.
- Appearances and goals are composed of FIFA World Cup qualification, UEFA European Championship qualifying and UEFA Nations League matches, as well as numerous international friendly matches.
- Statistics are correct as of the match played on 6 October 2026.
- Players in **bold** are still active with Moldova.

== List ==
Moldova national football team players with at least 20 appearances
#	Name	Pos.	Caps	Goals	Debut	Last or most recent match	Ref.
1	Alexandru Epureanu	DF	100	7	6 September 2006	31 March 2021	
2	Igor Armaș	DF	83	6	28 May 2008	20 November 2022	
3	Artur Ioniță	MF	81	5	28 March 2009	16 November 2025	
4	Victor Golovatenco	DF	79	3	18 February 2004	27 March 2017	
5	Radu Rebeja	MF	74	2	2 July 1991	15 October 2008	
5	Veaceslav Posmac	DF	74	2	14 June 2013	6 June 2025	
7	Serghei Cleșcenco	FW	69	11	2 July 1991	7 October 2006	
8	Eugeniu Cebotaru	MF	68	1	17 November 2007	18 November 2020	
9	**Vadim Rață**	MF	67	3	14 February 2015	6 October 2026	
10	**Oleg Reabciuk**	DF	66	0	27 March 2018	6 October 2026	
11	Alexandru Gațcan	MF	63	5	9 February 2005	18 November 2018	
12	**Sergiu Plătică**	DF	59	0	17 January 2017	30 March 2026	
12	Alexandru Suvorov	MF	59	5	18 May 2006	7 October 2020	
14	**Ion Nicolaescu**	FW	56	18	8 September 2018	16 November 2025	
14	Ion Testemițanu	DF	56	5	2 July 1991	6 February 2008	
14	Stanislav Namașco	GK	56	0	17 November 2007	24 March 2022	
17	Alexandru Dedov	MF	55	3	15 August 2012	11 October 2019	
17	Valeriu Catînsus	DF	55	0	16 December 1999	14 October 2009	
19	Igor Bugaiov	FW	54	8	7 February 2007	5 September 2017	
20	Serghei Rogaciov	FW	52	9	5 October 1996	12 September 2007	
21	Petru Racu	DF	50	0	11 August 2010	14 October 2020	
21	Ion Jardan	DF	50	0	14 June 2013	7 September 2023	
23	Vitalie Bordian	DF	49	1	3 September 2005	9 October 2017	
24	Alexandru Antoniuc	MF	48	3	29 May 2010	21 January 2022	
25	Sergiu Epureanu	MF	47	3	9 April 1996	11 October 2006	
25	Radu Gînsari	FW	47	7	23 May 2012	24 March 2022	
27	**Vitalie Damașcan**	FW	46	5	27 January 2018	13 November 2025	
27	Serghei Stroenco	DF	46	0	20 May 1992	17 October 2007	
29	Vladimir Gaidamașciuc	MF	45	1	20 May 1992	6 October 2001	
30	Andrei Cojocari	MF	43	2	28 March 2007	31 March 2021	
30	Stanislav Ivanov	MF	43	0	6 October 2001	6 February 2013	
32	Igor Oprea	MF	42	4	20 May 1992	15 August 2001	
32	Vadim Boreț	MF	42	1	18 August 1999	6 September 2011	
32	Ghenadie Olexici	DF	42	0	15 August 2001	17 November 2007	
35	Serghei Covalciuc	MF	41	2	15 August 2001	12 October 2012	
36	Vadim Bolohan	DF	40	1	3 March 2010	20 November 2022	
37	**Mihail Caimacov**	MF	39	3	3 September 2020	16 November 2025	
37	Boris Cebotari	MF	39	1	16 April 1994	16 August 2006	
39	**Artur Crăciun**	DF	38	0	14 November 2019	13 November 2025	
39	Alexandru Curtianu	MF	38	2	16 April 1994	27 March 2002	
39	Oleg Șișchin	MF	38	1	9 April 1996	16 August 2006	
42	**Virgiliu Postolachi**	FW	37	1	25 March 2021	9 June 2026	
42	Viorel Frunză	FW	37	7	20 November 2002	27 March 2015	
42	Serghei Lașcencov	DF	37	0	31 March 2004	14 October 2009	
42	Alexei Savinov	DF	37	0	10 September 2003	6 September 2011	
46	Iurie Miterev	FW	36	8	20 May 1992	18 May 2006	
46	Valeriu Andronic	MF	36	4	15 August 2001	27 May 2016	
46	Cătălin Carp	MF	36	2	14 August 2013	31 March 2021	
49	**Nichita Moțpan**	MF	35	3	10 June 2022	6 October 2026	
49	Eugen Sidorenco	FW	35	7	26 May 2010	14 October 2019	
49	Alexandru Covalenco	MF	35	0	16 December 1999	4 June 2005	
52	**Victor Stînă**	MF	34	4	3 June 2022	6 October 2026	
53	**Vladislav Baboglo**	DF	32	3	17 June 2023	6 October 2026	
53	**Ioan-Călin Revenco**	DF	32	1	12 November 2021	6 October 2026	
53	**Maxim Cojocaru**	FW	32	1	7 September 2019	9 September 2025	
56	Sergiu Dadu	FW	30	8	20 November 2002	6 February 2013	
56	Eugen Hmaruc	GK	30	0	4 June 2000	18 May 2006	
56	Ilie Cebanu	GK	30	0	11 October 2013	30 January 2018	
59	Artur Pătraș	MF	29	0	6 February 2011	9 January 2020	
59	Eugeniu Cociuc	MF	29	0	9 June 2015	16 November 2022	
61	Anatolie Doroș	FW	28	3	22 August 2007	11 October 2013	
61	Oleg Fistican	DF	28	0	26 April 1995	6 February 2000	
63	Serghei Secu	DF	27	1	2 July 1991	23 March 1997	
64	**Alexei Koșelev**	GK	26	0	9 October 2015	22 March 2024	
64	Iurie Priganiuc	DF	26	0	6 February 2000	12 October 2005	
64	Denis Romanenco	GK	26	0	9 April 1996	16 August 2006	
67	Serghei Alexeev	FW	25	5	7 February 2007	8 September 2014	
67	Serghei Belous	MF	25	1	16 April 1994	16 December 1999	
69	Igor Picușceac	FW	24	3	6 September 2008	18 February 2015	
69	Simion Bulgaru	DF	24	1	7 February 2007	6 September 2013	
71	**Victor Mudrac**	DF	23	1	7 September 2019	9 June 2025	
71	Igor Țîgîrlaș	MF	23	1	7 February 2007	11 June 2017	
71	Andrei Corneencov	MF	23	0	14 February 2004	11 February 2009	
71	Vasile Coșelev	GK	23	0	20 May 1992	10 March 1999	
75	Gheorghe Ovseanicov	FW	22	2	24 May 2008	7 June 2013	
75	Alexandru Guzun	DF	22	1	2 July 1991	6 February 2000	
75	Alexandru Onică	MF	22	0	18 November 2008	17 November 2015	
75	Dan Spătaru	MF	22	0	15 November 2014	18 January 2022	
79	Alexandru Popovici	FW	21	3	9 April 1996	8 October 2005	
79	Denis Calincov	FW	21	2	20 August 2003	3 September 2014	
81	**Cristian Dros**	MF	20	0	9 January 2020	6 October 2026	
81	Denis Zmeu	MF	20	1	24 March 2007	11 November 2011	
81	Serghei Pașcenco	GK	20	0	12 October 2005	26 February 2018	
