= Serghei Dinov =

Moldovan former footballer

Personal information
- Full name: Serghei Dinov
- Date of birth: 23 April 1969 (age 57)
- Place of birth: Moldovan SSR
- Position: Goalkeeper

Team information
- Current team: Moldova (goalkeepers coach)

Senior career*
Years	Team	Apps	(Gls)
1991	Aktobe Aktyubinets	4	(0)
1992	Dinamo Bender	16	(0)
1992–1994	Bugeac Comrat	60	(0)
1994–1995	Nistru Otaci	7	(0)
1995–2000	Constructorul-93 Chișinău	102	(0)
2001	Bnei Sakhnin	0	(0)
2001	Zimbru Chișinău	2	(0)
2002	FC Hîncești	13	(0)
2002–2004	Nistru Otaci	38	(0)
2004–2005	Unisport-Auto Chișinău	11	(0)

International career
1998–2000	Moldova	17	(0)

Managerial career
- Zimbru–2 Chișinău (goalkeepers coach)
- Moldova (goalkeepers coach)
- * Club domestic league appearances and goals

Serghei Dinov (born 23 April 1969) is a Moldovan goalkeepers coach and former Moldova international footballer, who played as a goalkeeper. Currently Serghei Dinov works as goalkeepers coach at the Moldovan team Zimbru–2 Chișinău, and as well at the Moldova national football team.

Between 1998 and 2000 Serghei Dinov has played 17 matches for Moldova.

== Honours ==
Constructorul Chișinău

- Divizia Națională: 1996–1997

Runner-up: 1998–99

- Moldovan Cup: 1995–1996, 1999–2000

Bugeac Comrat

- Moldovan Cup: 1992
