= Moldovan Footballer of the Year =

Annual Moldovan sports award

The Moldovan Footballer of the Year Award is an annual award for Moldovan footballers, organized by the Moldovan Football Federation.

== Player of the year ==
Year	Player	Team	Position
1992	Alexandru Spiridon	(Moldova) Zimbru Chișinău	Midfielder
1993	Alexandru Curtianu	(Moldova) Zimbru Chișinău	Midfielder
1994	Serghei Cleșcenco	(Moldova) Zimbru Chișinău	Forward
1995	Ion Testemițanu	(Moldova) Zimbru Chișinău	Defender
1996	Serghei Rogaciov	(Moldova) Olimpia Bălți	Forward
1997	Ion Testemițanu	(Moldova) Zimbru Chișinău	Defender
1998	Alexandru Curtianu	(Russia) Zenit Saint Petersburg	Midfielder
1999	Sergiu Epureanu	(Moldova) Zimbru Chișinău	Midfielder
2000	Serghei Cleșcenco	(Israel) Maccabi Haifa	Forward
2001	Serghei Rogaciov	(Russia) Saturn Ramenskoe	Forward
2002	Boris Cebotari	(Moldova) Zimbru Chișinău	Midfielder
2003	Serghei Covalciuc	(Ukraine) Karpaty Lviv	Midfielder
2004	Serghei Covalciuc	(Ukraine) Karpaty Lviv / (Russia) Spartak Moscow	Midfielder
2005	Serghei Covalciuc	(Russia) Spartak Moscow	Midfielder
2006	Radu Rebeja	(Russia) Moscow	Midfielder
2007	Alexandru Epureanu	(Russia) Moscow	Defender
2008	Vitalie Bordian	(Ukraine) Metalist Kharkiv	Defender
2009	Alexandru Epureanu	(Russia) Moscow	Defender
2010	Alexandru Epureanu	(Russia) Dinamo Moscow	Defender
2011	Alexandru Suvorov	(Poland) Cracovia	Midfielder
2012	Alexandru Epureanu	(Russia) Dinamo Moscow / (Russia) Krylya Sovetov Samara	Defender
2013	Alexandru Gațcan	(Russia) Rostov	Midfielder
2014	Artur Ioniță	(Italy) Hellas Verona	Midfielder
2015	Alexandru Gațcan	(Russia) Rostov	Midfielder
2016	Alexandru Gațcan	(Russia) Rostov	Midfielder
2017	Alexandru Gațcan	(Russia) Rostov	Midfielder
2018	Alexandru Epureanu	(Turkey) İstanbul Başakşehir	Defender
2019	Artur Ioniță	(Italy) Cagliari	Midfielder
2020	Oleg Reabciuk	(Portugal) Paços de Ferreira	Defender
2021	Oleg Reabciuk	(Greece) Olympiacos	Defender
2022	Oleg Reabciuk	(Greece) Olympiacos	Defender
2023	Ion Nicolaescu	(Netherlands) Heerenveen	Forward
2024	Ion Nicolaescu	(Netherlands) Heerenveen	Forward
2025	Ion Nicolaescu	(Netherlands) Heerenveen / (Israel) Maccabi Tel Aviv	Forward

=== Full rankings ===
Season	Winner	Runner-up	Third place
1992	Alexandru Spiridon		
1993	Alexandru Curtianu		
1994	Serghei Cleșcenco		
1995	Ion Testemițanu		
1996	Serghei Rogaciov		
1997	Ion Testemițanu		
1998	Alexandru Curtianu		
1999	Sergiu Epureanu		
2000	Serghei Cleșcenco		
2001	Serghei Rogaciov	Serghei Cleșcenco	Radu Rebeja
2002	Boris Cebotari		
2003	Serghei Covalciuc	Sergiu Dadu	Valeriu Catînsus
2004	Serghei Covalciuc	Radu Rebeja	Sergiu Dadu
2005	Serghei Covalciuc	Radu Rebeja	Serghei Rogaciov
2006	Radu Rebeja	Serghei Covalciuc	Viorel Frunză
2007	Alexandru Epureanu	Radu Rebeja	Viorel Frunză
2008	Vitalie Bordian	Alexandru Epureanu	Stanislav Ivanov
2009	Alexandru Epureanu	Alexandru Gațcan	Sergiu Dadu
2010	Alexandru Epureanu	Alexandru Suvorov	Vitalie Bordian
2011	Alexandru Suvorov	Alexandru Gațcan	Igor Armaș
2012	Alexandru Epureanu	Igor Armaș	Alexandru Gațcan
2013	Alexandru Gațcan	Alexandru Epureanu	Artur Ioniță
2014	Artur Ioniță	Alexandru Epureanu	Ilie Cebanu
2015	Alexandru Gațcan	Igor Armaș	Artur Ioniță
2016	Alexandru Gațcan		
2017	Alexandru Gațcan	Alexandru Epureanu	Artur Ioniță
2018	Alexandru Epureanu	Alexandru Gațcan	Artur Ioniță
2019	Artur Ioniță	Veaceslav Posmac	Cătălin Carp
2020	Oleg Reabciuk	Alexandru Epureanu	Artur Ioniță
2021	Oleg Reabciuk	Artur Ioniță	Vadim Rață
2022	Oleg Reabciuk	Vadim Rață	Ion Nicolaescu
2023	Ion Nicolaescu	Vadim Rață	Vladislav Baboglo
2024	Ion Nicolaescu	Vadim Rață	Oleg Reabciuk
2025	Ion Nicolaescu	Vladimir Fratea	Ion Jardan

=== By titles ===
Pos.	Name	Titles	Years
1	Alexandru Epureanu	5	2007, 2009, 2010, 2012, 2018
2	Alexandru Gațcan	4	2013, 2015, 2016, 2017
3	Serghei Covalciuc	3	2003, 2004, 2005
3	Oleg Reabciuk	3	2020, 2021, 2022
3	Ion Nicolaescu	3	2023, 2024, 2025
6	Ion Testemițanu	2	1995, 1997
6	Alexandru Curtianu	2	1993, 1998
6	Serghei Cleșcenco	2	1994, 2000
6	Serghei Rogaciov	2	1996, 2001
6	Artur Ioniță	2	2014, 2019
11	Alexandru Spiridon	1	1992
11	Sergiu Epureanu	1	1999
11	Boris Cebotari	1	2002
11	Radu Rebeja	1	2006
11	Vitalie Bordian	1	2008
11	Alexandru Suvorov	1	2011

=== By team ===
Pos.	Team	Titles	Years
1	Zimbru Chișinău	7	1992, 1993, 1994, 1995, 1997, 1999, 2002
2	Rostov	4	2013, 2015, 2016, 2017
3	Moscow	3	2006, 2007, 2009
4	Karpaty Lviv	2	2003, 2004
4	Spartak Moscow	2	2004, 2005
4	Dinamo Moscow	2	2010, 2012
4	Olympiacos	2	2021, 2022
4	Heerenveen	2	2023, 2024
9	Olimpia Bălți	1	1996
9	Zenit Saint Petersburg	1	1998
9	Maccabi Haifa	1	2000
9	Saturn Ramenskoe	1	2001
9	Metalist Kharkiv	1	2008
9	Cracovia	1	2011
9	Krylia Sovetov Samara	1	2012
9	Hellas Verona	1	2014
9	İstanbul Başakşehir	1	2018
9	Cagliari	1	2019
9	Paços de Ferreira	1	2020
9	Maccabi Tel Aviv	1	2025

=== By position ===
Pos.	Position	Titles
1	Midfielder	16
2	Defender	11
3	Forward	7
4	Goalkeeper	0

== Coach of the year ==
Season	Winner	Runner-up	Third place
2001	Alexandru Spiridon (Moldova U21)		
2004	(Moldova) Alexandr Mațiura (Nistru Otaci)		
2005	Boris Tropaneț (Moldova U21)		
2006	(Moldova) Emil Caras (Dacia Chișinău)		
2007	(Russia) Igor Dobrovolski (Moldova)	(Moldova) Emil Caras (Dacia Chișinău)	(Belarus) Leonid Kuchuk (Sheriff Tiraspol)
2008	Vlad Goian (Iskra-Stal Rîbnița, Moldova U19)	(Moldova) Ion Caras (Zimbru Chișinău)	(Belarus) Leonid Kuchuk (Sheriff Tiraspol)
2009	(Belarus) Leonid Kuchuk (Sheriff Tiraspol)	Vlad Goian (Iskra-Stal Rîbnița, Moldova U19)	(Russia) Igor Dobrovolski (Moldova)
2010	(Moldova) Vlad Goian (Iskra-Stal Rîbnița)	(Belarus) Andrei Sosnitskiy (Sheriff Tiraspol)	(Moldova) Nicolae Bunea (Olimpia Bălți)
2011	(Russia) Igor Dobrovolski (Dacia Chișinău)	(Belarus) Vitaly Rashkevich (Sheriff Tiraspol)	(Romania) Gabi Balint (Moldova); Vlad Goian (Tiraspol)
2012	(Moldova) Vlad Goian (Tiraspol)	(Russia) Igor Dobrovolski (Dacia Chișinău)	Alexandru Curtianu (Moldova)
2013	Ion Caras (Moldova)	(Moldova) Lilian Popescu (Costuleni)	Alexandru Curtianu (Moldova U19)
2014	(Moldova) Lilian Popescu (Veris Chișinău)	Alexandru Curtianu (Moldova)	(Belarus) Oleg Kubarev (Zimbru Chișinău)
2015	(Moldova) Iurie Osipenco (Milsami Orhei)	(Romania) Ștefan Stoica (Moldova, Zimbru Chișinău)	(Moldova) Lilian Popescu (Sheriff Tiraspol)
2016	(Moldova) Adrian Sosnovschi (Milsami Orhei)		
2017	(Moldova) Veaceslav Rusnac (Milsami Orhei)		
2018	(Moldova) Lilian Popescu (Petrocub Hîncești)		
2019	(Moldova) Serghei Cebotari (Sfîntul Gheorghe Suruceni)		
2020	(Moldova) Lilian Popescu (Petrocub Hîncești)	(Moldova) Serghei Cebotari (Sfîntul Gheorghe Suruceni)	(Moldova) Andrei Martin (Dacia Buiucani)
2021	(Ukraine) Yuriy Vernydub (Sheriff Tiraspol)	(Moldova) Lilian Popescu (Petrocub Hîncești)	(Moldova) Serghei Dubrovin (Milsami Orhei)
2022	(Moldova) Lilian Popescu (Zimbru Chișinău)	Serghei Cleșcenco (Moldova)	(Romania) Ștefan Stoica (Moldova U21)
2023	(Moldova) Serghei Cleșcenco (Moldova)	(Moldova) Lilian Popescu (Zimbru Chișinău)	(Moldova) Andrei Martin (Petrocub Hîncești)
2024	(Moldova) Andrei Martin (Petrocub Hîncești)	Serghei Cleșcenco (Moldova)	(Moldova) Veaceslav Rusnac (Bălți)
2025	(Belarus) Oleg Kubarev (Zimbru Chișinău)	Lilian Popescu (Moldova)	(Moldova) Igor Picușceac (Milsami Orhei)
