= Sergiu Perciun =

Moldovan footballer

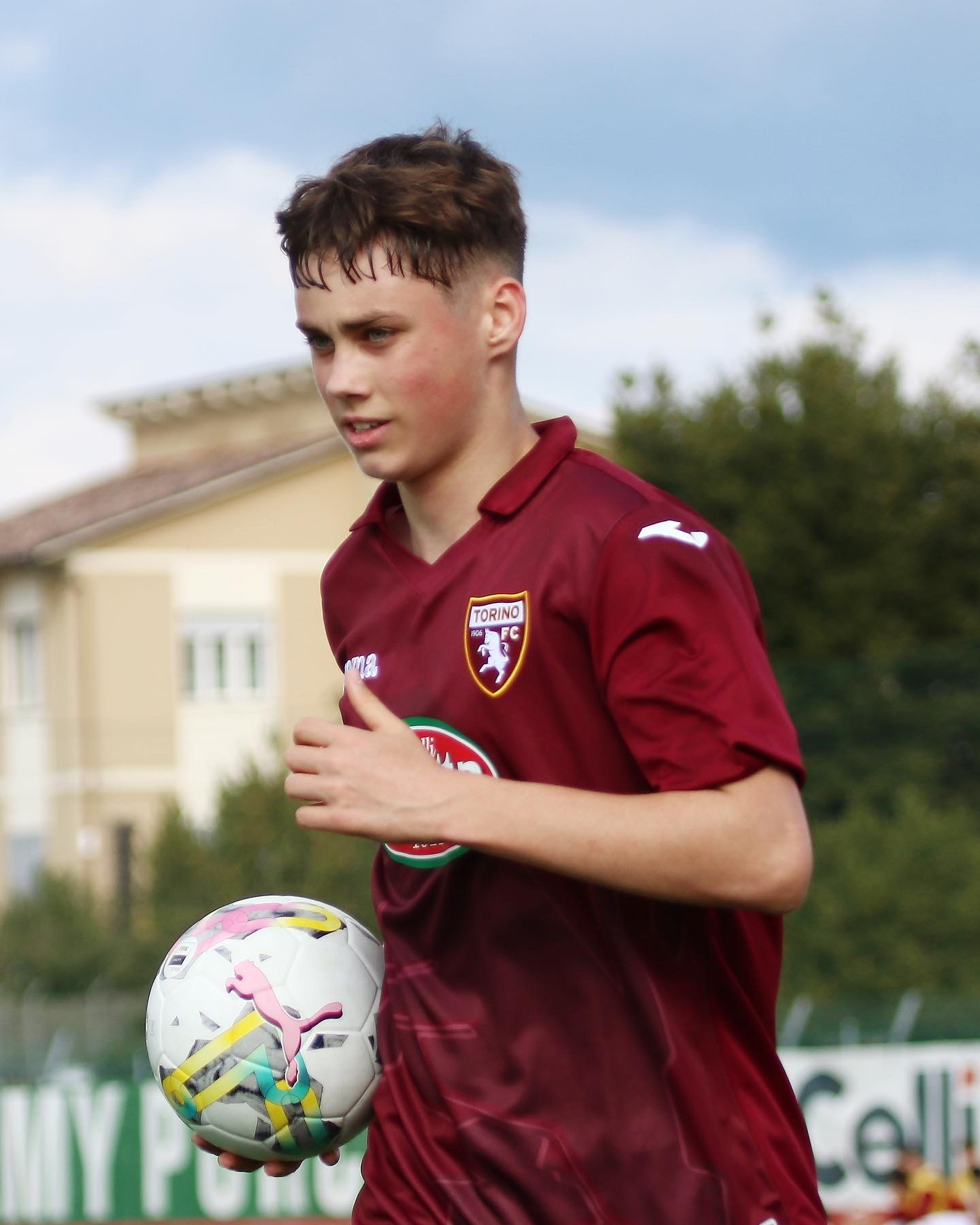
- Perciun in 2023

Personal information
- Date of birth: 23 April 2006 (age 20)
- Place of birth: Chișinău, Moldova
- Height: 1.75 m (5 ft 9 in)
- Positions: Attacking midfielder; winger

Team information
- Current team: Ascoli (on loan from Torino)
- Number: 11

Youth career
- –2022: Academia Rebeja
- 2022–2025: Torino

Senior career*
Years	Team	Apps	(Gls)
2024–	Torino	5	(0)
2026–	→ Ascoli (loan)	4	(0)

International career^{‡}
2022	Moldova U16	7	(4)
2022	Moldova U17	6	(4)
2023	Moldova U18	4	(3)
2024	Moldova U19	5	(3)
2025	Moldova U21	2	(0)
2025–	Moldova	16	(1)
- * Club domestic league appearances and goals as of 24 October 2026 ‡ National team caps and goals as of 17 November 2026

Sergiu Perciun (born 23 April 2006) is a Moldovan professional footballer who plays as an attacking midfielder or winger for Serie B club Ascoli, on loan from Serie A club Torino, and the Moldova national team.

== Club career ==
A youth product of Academia Rebeja, Perciun joined Torino in 2022. He made his professional debut in Serie A on his 19th birthday in a 2–0 victory against Udinese. Perciun came on as a substitute in the 76th minute and provided an assist for the second goal. Before making his debut, Perciun had scored four times and provided one assist in 22 league appearances for the youth team in the same season.

In July 2026, Perciun joined Serie B club Ascoli on loan.

== International career ==
Having represented Moldova since the under-16 level, Perciun made his debut for the under-21 team in a friendly match against Northern Ireland on 20 March 2025. The same year, on 6 June, he made his senior debut as a substitute in a 2–0 friendly loss against Poland.

== Style of play ==
Perciun is a right-footed footballer who takes advantage of space to shoot towards the opponent's goal.

== Career statistics ==
=== International ===
As of match played on 16 November 2026

Appearances and goals by national team and year
National team	Year	Apps	Goals
Moldova	2025	7	0
Moldova	2026	9	1
Total		16	1

Scores and results list Moldova's goal tally first, score column indicates score after each Perciun goal.

List of international goals scored by Sergiu Perciun
No.	Date	Venue	Opponent	Score	Result	Competition
1	29 September 2026	Stadionul Zimbru, Chișinău, Moldova	Faroe Islands	1–1	1–1	2026–27 UEFA Nations League
