= Victor Golovatenco =

Moldavan footballer

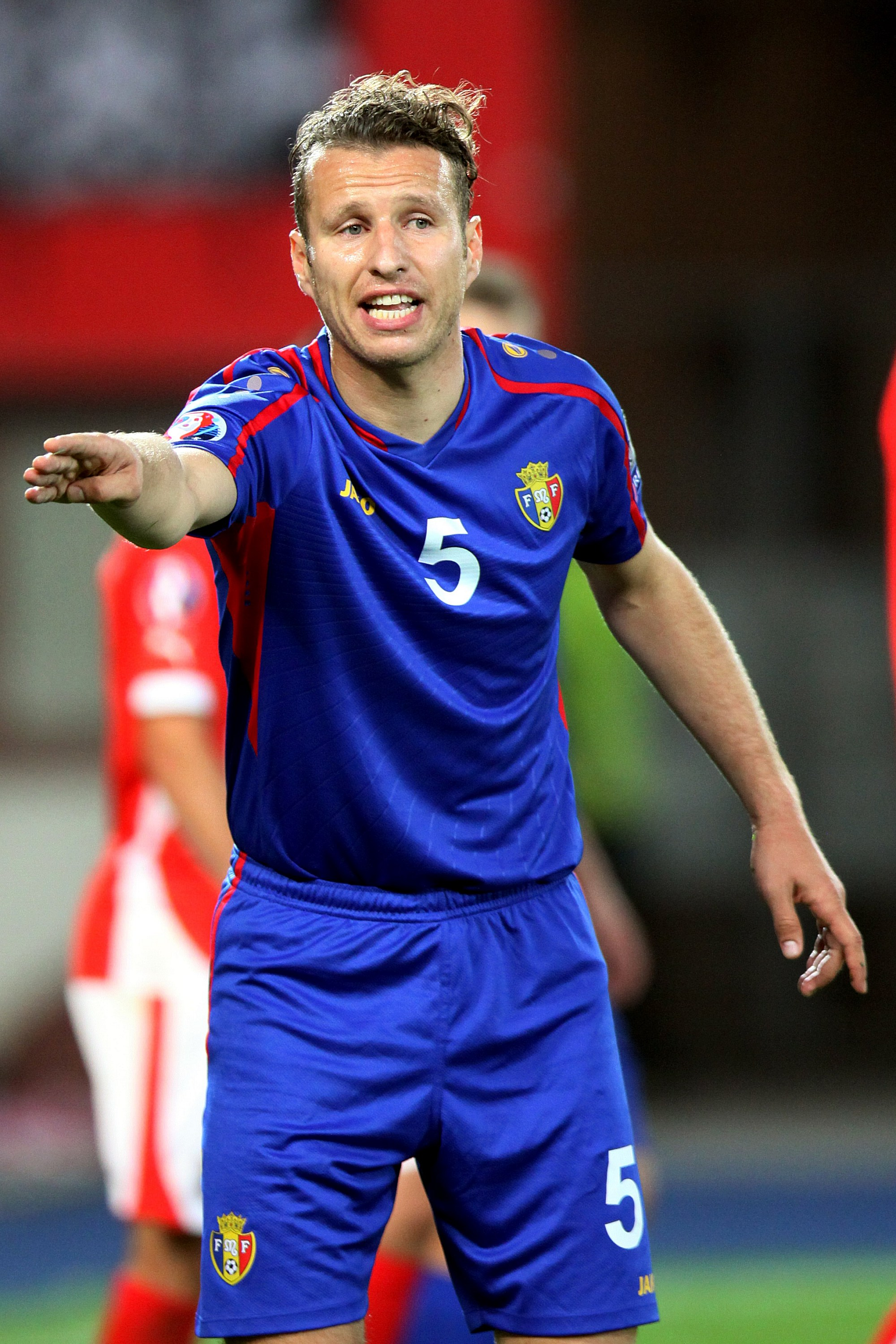
- Golovatenco with Moldova in 2015

Personal information
- Date of birth: 28 April 1984 (age 42)
- Place of birth: Chișinău, Moldavian SSR, Soviet Union
- Height: 1.89 m (6 ft 2 in)
- Position: Defender

Senior career*
Years	Team	Apps	(Gls)
2003	Sheriff Tiraspol	6	(0)
2003–2007	Tiraspol	69	(5)
2007–2009	Khimki	39	(0)
2010	Kuban Krasnodar	30	(2)
2011–2016	Sibir Novosibirsk	135	(2)
2016–2018	Zaria Bălți	42	(5)
2018	Zimbru Chișinău	9	(1)
Total		330	(15)

International career
2004–2017	Moldova	79	(3)
- * Club domestic league appearances and goals

Victor Golovatenco (born 28 April 1984) is a former Moldovan footballer.

== International career ==
Golovatenco has made 79 appearances for the senior Moldova national football team, scoring three goals. He ranks second in terms of all-time appearances for Moldova. He has played for Moldova in the UEFA Euro 2008 qualifying, UEFA Euro 2012 qualifying and UEFA Euro 2016 qualifying, as well as the 2010 FIFA World Cup qualification, 2014 FIFA World Cup qualification and 2018 FIFA World Cup qualification.

== Career statistics ==
=== International ===
As of 26 March 2021

Appearances and goals by national team and year
National team	Year	Apps	Goals
Moldova	2004	2	0
Moldova	2005	0	0
Moldova	2006	0	0
Moldova	2007	7	0
Moldova	2008	8	0
Moldova	2009	9	3
Moldova	2010	3	0
Moldova	2011	9	0
Moldova	2012	7	0
Moldova	2013	9	0
Moldova	2014	10	0
Moldova	2015	6	0
Moldova	2016	5	0
Moldova	2017	4	0
Total		79	3

Scores and results list Moldova's goal tally first.

List of international goals scored by Victor Golovatenco
No.	Date	Venue	Opponent	Score	Result	Competition
1	6 June 2009	Mikheil Meskhi Stadium, Tbilisi	Georgia	2–0	2–1	Friendly
2	12 August 2009	Republican Stadium, Yerevan	Armenia	1–0	4–1	Friendly
3	12 August 2009	Republican Stadium, Yerevan	Armenia	2–0	4–1	Friendly
