= Lilian Popescu =

Moldovan footballer (born 1973)

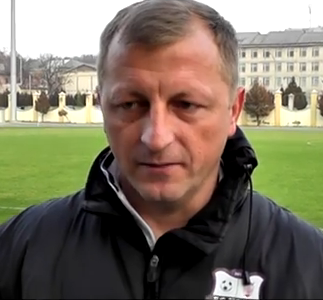
- Popescu as head coach of Veris Chișinău in 2014

Personal information
- Date of birth: 15 November 1973 (age 52)
- Place of birth: Făleștii Noi, Moldavian SSR, Soviet Union
- Height: 1.88 m (6 ft 2 in)
- Position: Midfielder

Team information
- Current team: Moldova (head coach)

Youth career
- 1987: Cristalul Fălești

Senior career*
Years	Team	Apps	(Gls)
1992–1993	Agro Chișinău	52	(18)
1993–1994	Nistru Otaci	25	(1)
1995	Agro Chișinău	23	(6)
1996–1998	Nistru Otaci	40	(17)
1998	Sheriff Tiraspol	20	(0)
1999–2006	Nistru Otaci	114	(17)
2006	Ekibastuzets Ekibastuz	5	(0)
2006–2007	Olimpia Bălți	27	(1)
Total		296	(60)

International career
1998–2000	Moldova	6	(0)

Managerial career
- 2006–2007: Olimpia Bălți (player-manager)
- 2007–2008: Olimpia Bălți
- 2008–2012: Nistru Otaci
- 2012: Costuleni
- 2013–2014: Costuleni
- 2014: Veris Chișinău
- 2014–2015: Tiraspol
- 2015: Sheriff Tiraspol
- 2017–2022: Petrocub Hîncești
- 2022–2024: Zimbru Chișinău
- 2025: Moldova U19
- 2025–: Moldova
- * Club domestic league appearances and goals

Lilian Popescu (born 15 November 1973) is a Moldovan professional football manager and former player. He is the current head coach of the Moldova national team.

== Career statistics ==
=== International ===
Appearances and goals by national team and year
National team	Year	Apps	Goals
Moldova	1998	4	0
Moldova	1999	0	0
Moldova	2000	2	0
Total		6	0

== Honours ==
=== Managerial ===
Sheriff Tiraspol

- Moldovan Super Cup: 2015

Petrocub Hîncești

- Moldovan Cup: 2019–20

Individual

- Moldovan Coach of the Year: 2014, 2018, 2020, 2022
