= Alexandru Epureanu =

Moldovan footballer

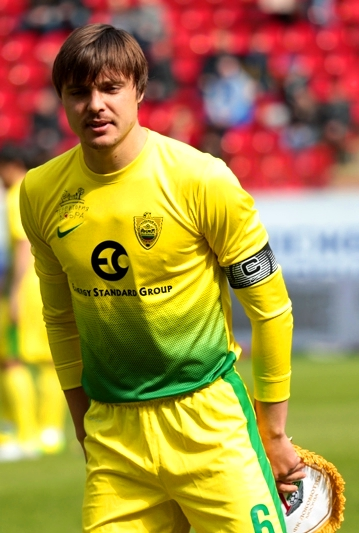
- Epureanu with Anzhi Makhachkala in 2014

Personal information
- Date of birth: 27 September 1986 (age 40)
- Place of birth: Chișinău, Moldavian SSR, Soviet Union
- Height: 1.89 m (6 ft 2 in)
- Position: Centre-back

Youth career
- 1995–1998: Hoverla Uzhhorod
- 1998–2002: Zimbru Chișinău

Senior career*
Years	Team	Apps	(Gls)
2002–2004	Zimbru Chișinău	29	(2)
2004–2006	Sheriff Tiraspol	66	(3)
2007–2009	Moscow	72	(3)
2010–2014	Dynamo Moscow	44	(3)
2012	→ Krylia Sovetov (loan)	17	(1)
2013	→ Anzhi Makhachkala (loan)	7	(0)
2014	Anzhi Makhachkala	10	(2)
2014–2023	İstanbul Başakşehir	214	(14)
2023	Ümraniyespor	13	(0)
Total		469	(28)

International career^{‡}
2002–2005	Moldova U19		
2005–2007	Moldova U21	18	(0)
2006–2021	Moldova	100	(7)
- * Club domestic league appearances and goals as of 7 June 2023 ‡ National team caps and goals as of 25 March 2024

Alexandru Epureanu (born 27 September 1986) is a Moldovan former professional footballer who played as a centre-back.

== Club career ==
Born in Chișinau, Epureanu joined FC Sheriff Tiraspol in summer 2004.

He has won Moldovan Footballer of the Year in 2007, 2009, 2010, 2012 and 2018. Since playing for FC Sheriff Tiraspol, he has gone on to play for Dinamo Moscow.

On 2 July 2014, Epureanu signed for İstanbul Başakşehir. He made his league debut for the club on 30 August 2014 in a 1–1 home draw with Kasımpaşa, playing all ninety minutes of the match. He scored his first league goal for the club on 5 October 2014 in a 4–0 home victory over Akhisarspor. His goal, scored in the sixth minute, made the score 1–0 to İstanbul BB.

In January 2023, Epureanu departed Başakşehir and subsequently joined Ümraniyespor until the end of the season. On 25 March 2024, he confirmed that he retired from football.

== International career ==
Epureanu made his international debut in a 2–0 UEFA Euro 2008 qualifying loss against Norway on 6 September 2006, and has since been a regular in the national team, wearing the captain's armband on several occasions. In September 2019, Epureanu retired from the national team due to a knee injury. However, he returned in August 2020. He ranks first in terms of all-time appearances for Moldova. On 31 March 2021, he made his 100th and last appearance for Moldova in a 2022 FIFA World Cup qualification match against Israel.

== Career statistics ==
=== Club ===
As of 22 June 2023

Club	Season	League			Cup		Europe		Other		Total	
Club	Season	Division	Apps	Goals	Apps	Goals	Apps	Goals	Apps	Goals	Apps	Goals
Zimbru Chișinău	2002–03	Moldovan National Division	5	0			0	0	—		5	0
Zimbru Chișinău	2003–04	Moldovan National Division	24	2			3	0	—		27	2
Zimbru Chișinău	Total		29	2			3	0	—		32	2
Sheriff Tiraspol	2004–05	Moldovan National Division	22	0			0	0	—		22	0
Sheriff Tiraspol	2005–06	Moldovan National Division	27	2			4	2	—		31	4
Sheriff Tiraspol	2006–07	Moldovan National Division	17	1			4	0	—		21	1
Sheriff Tiraspol	Total		66	3			8	2	—		74	5
FC Moscow	2007	Russian Premier League	23	0			—		—		23	0
FC Moscow	2008	Russian Premier League	24	1	2	1	3	0	—		29	2
FC Moscow	2009	Russian Premier League	25	2	1	0	—		—		26	2
FC Moscow	Total		72	3	3	1	3	0	—		78	4
Dynamo Moscow	2010	Russian Premier League	23	2	2	0	—		—		25	2
Dynamo Moscow	2011–12	Russian Premier League	14	1	3	0	—		—		17	1
Dynamo Moscow	2012–13	Russian Premier League	7	0	0	0	—		—		7	0
Dynamo Moscow	Total		44	3	5	0	—		—		49	3
Krylia Sovetov (loan)	2012–13	Russian Premier League	17	1	2	1	—		—		19	2
Anzhi Makhachkala (loan)	2013–14	Russian Premier League	7	0	1	0	4	1	—		12	1
Anzhi Makhachkala	2013–14	Russian Premier League	10	2	0	0	4	0	—		14	2
İstanbul Başakşehir	2014–15	Süper Lig	32	4	1	0	—		—		33	4
İstanbul Başakşehir	2015–16	Süper Lig	14	0	9	0	0	0	—		23	0
İstanbul Başakşehir	2016–17	Süper Lig	30	1	6	0	4	0	—		40	1
İstanbul Başakşehir	2017–18	Süper Lig	31	6	1	0	10	0	—		42	6
İstanbul Başakşehir	2018–19	Süper Lig	22	2	1	1	2	0	—		25	3
İstanbul Başakşehir	2019–20	Süper Lig	29	0	0	0	5	0	—		34	0
İstanbul Başakşehir	2020–21	Süper Lig	30	0	2	0	5	0	1 (Note: Appearance in Turkish Super Cup.)	0	38	0
İstanbul Başakşehir	2021-22	Süper Lig	22	1	1	0	0	0	0	0	23	1
İstanbul Başakşehir	2022-23	Süper Lig	4	0	0	0	0	0	0	0	4	0
İstanbul Başakşehir	Total		211	14	21	1	26	0	1	0	262	15
Career total			456	28	32	3	48	3	1	0	540	34

=== International ===
As of match played 31 March 2021

Appearances and goals by national team and year
National team	Year	Apps	Goals
Moldova	2006	3	0
Moldova	2007	9	1
Moldova	2008	10	0
Moldova	2009	8	1
Moldova	2010	7	1
Moldova	2011	8	0
Moldova	2012	6	1
Moldova	2013	7	0
Moldova	2014	8	3
Moldova	2015	3	0
Moldova	2016	7	0
Moldova	2017	7	0
Moldova	2018	8	0
Moldova	2019	0	0
Moldova	2020	6	0
Moldova	2021	3	0
Total		100	7

Scores and results list Moldova's goal tally first.

List of international goals scored by Alexandru Epureanu
No.	Date	Venue	Opponent	Score	Result	Competition
1	24 March 2007	Zimbru Stadium, Chișinău	Malta	1–1	1–1	Euro 2008 qualifier
2	12 August 2009	Republican Stadium, Yerevan	Armenia	4–1	4–1	Friendly
3	3 March 2010	Antalya Atatürk Stadium, Antalya	Kazakhstan	1–0	1–0	Friendly
4	16 October 2012	Stadio Olimpico, Serravalle	San Marino	2–0	2–0	2014 World Cup qualifier
5	5 March 2014	Estadi Comunal d'Andorra la Vella, Andorra la Vella	Andorra	1–0	3–0	Friendly
6	5 March 2014	Estadi Comunal d'Andorra la Vella, Andorra la Vella	Andorra	3–0	3–0	Friendly
7	12 October 2014	Otkrytie Arena, Moscow	Russia	1–1	1–1	Euro 2016 qualifier

Note: Some sources have credited Epureanu with scoring the second goal in a 4–0 victory over Saudi Arabia in 2014, however this was a penalty converted by Igor Picușceac.

== Honours ==
=== Club ===
Zimbru Chișinău

- Moldovan Cup: 2003–04

Sheriff Tiraspol

- Divizia Naţională: 2004–05, 2005–06
- Moldovan Cup: 2005–06
- Moldovan Supercup: 2005

Dynamo Moscow

- Russian Cup runner-up: 2011–12

İstanbul Başakşehir

- Süper Lig: 2019–20

=== Individual ===
- Moldovan Footballer of the Year: 2007, 2009, 2010, 2012, 2018
- Süper Lig Defender of the Season: 2018–19
- Süper Lig Team of the Season: 2018–19

== See also ==
- List of men's footballers with 100 or more international caps
