= Oleg Reabciuk =

Moldovan footballer (born 1998)

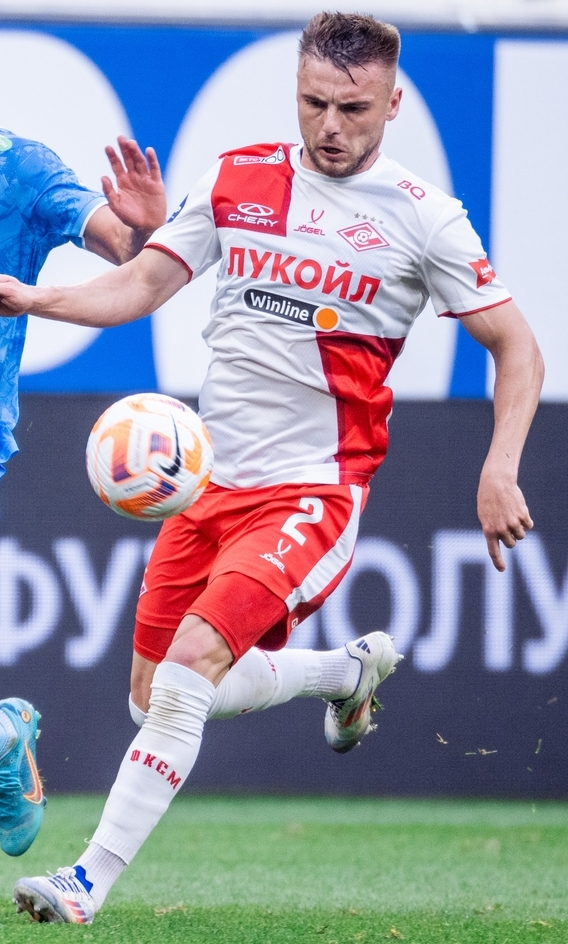
- Reabciuk with Spartak Moscow in 2024

Personal information
- Date of birth: 16 January 1998 (age 28)
- Place of birth: Ialoveni, Moldova
- Height: 1.77 m (5 ft 10 in)
- Position: Left-back

Team information
- Current team: Anderlecht
- Number: 5

Youth career
- 2009–2010: Rio Maior
- 2010–2011: Sporting CP
- 2011–2015: Rio Maior
- 2015–2016: Belenenses
- 2016–2017: Porto

Senior career*
Years	Team	Apps	(Gls)
2017–2019	Porto B	47	(4)
2019–2020	Paços de Ferreira	37	(2)
2021–2023	Olympiacos	82	(2)
2023–2026	Spartak Moscow	51	(0)
2026–	Anderlecht	1	(0)

International career^{‡}
2016	Moldova U19	2	(0)
2018–	Moldova	68	(0)
- * Club domestic league appearances and goals as of 25 October 2026 ‡ National team caps and goals as of 17 November 2026

Oleg Reabciuk (born 16 January 1998) is a Moldovan professional footballer who plays as a left-back for Belgian Pro League club Anderlecht and the Moldova national team.

Raised in Portugal, he played in the LigaPro for Porto B and the Primeira Liga for Paços de Ferreira. He moved in January 2021 to Olympiacos, where he won the Super League Greece in his first two seasons.

Reabciuk made his full international debut for Moldova in 2018, and has earned over 50 caps. He was named Moldovan Footballer of the Year on three consecutive occasions from 2020.

== Club career ==
=== Early career and Porto ===
Born in Ialoveni, Moldova, Reabciuk migrated at the age of four to Rio Maior in the Santarém District of Portugal. At 11, he was spotted by Sporting CP while playing for Rio Maior, but left a year later due to tiredness from the long journeys to Lisbon, and to concentrate on his education.

After becoming national champion with Rio Maior, Reabciuk was invited to train with Os Belenenses in June 2015, having impressed in a match against them. He then moved to Porto in a similar circumstance in July 2016, where he signed his first professional contract of four years in 2017.

On 26 November 2017, Reabciuk made his professional debut for Porto B in LigaPro, at home to Associação Académica de Coimbra. He played the first 67 minutes of the 2–1 defeat before being substituted for Musa Yahaya. The following 4 February, he scored a late winner as the team came from behind to beat neighbouring Leixões 2–1 also at the Estádio Dr. Jorge Sampaio. By 18 March, when he netted his fourth goal in ten appearances with one in a 3–0 home win over Sporting da Covilhã, he was the team's top scorer for the season.

=== Paços de Ferreira ===
On 13 July 2019, Reabciuk signed a four-year deal with Paços de Ferreira. He made his Primeira Liga debut on 24 August in a 1–1 draw at Boavista as a 75th-minute substitute for Renat Dadashov. On 18 October 2020, he scored his first top-flight goal to open a 2–1 home win over Santa Clara, his team's first of the season.

=== Olympiacos ===
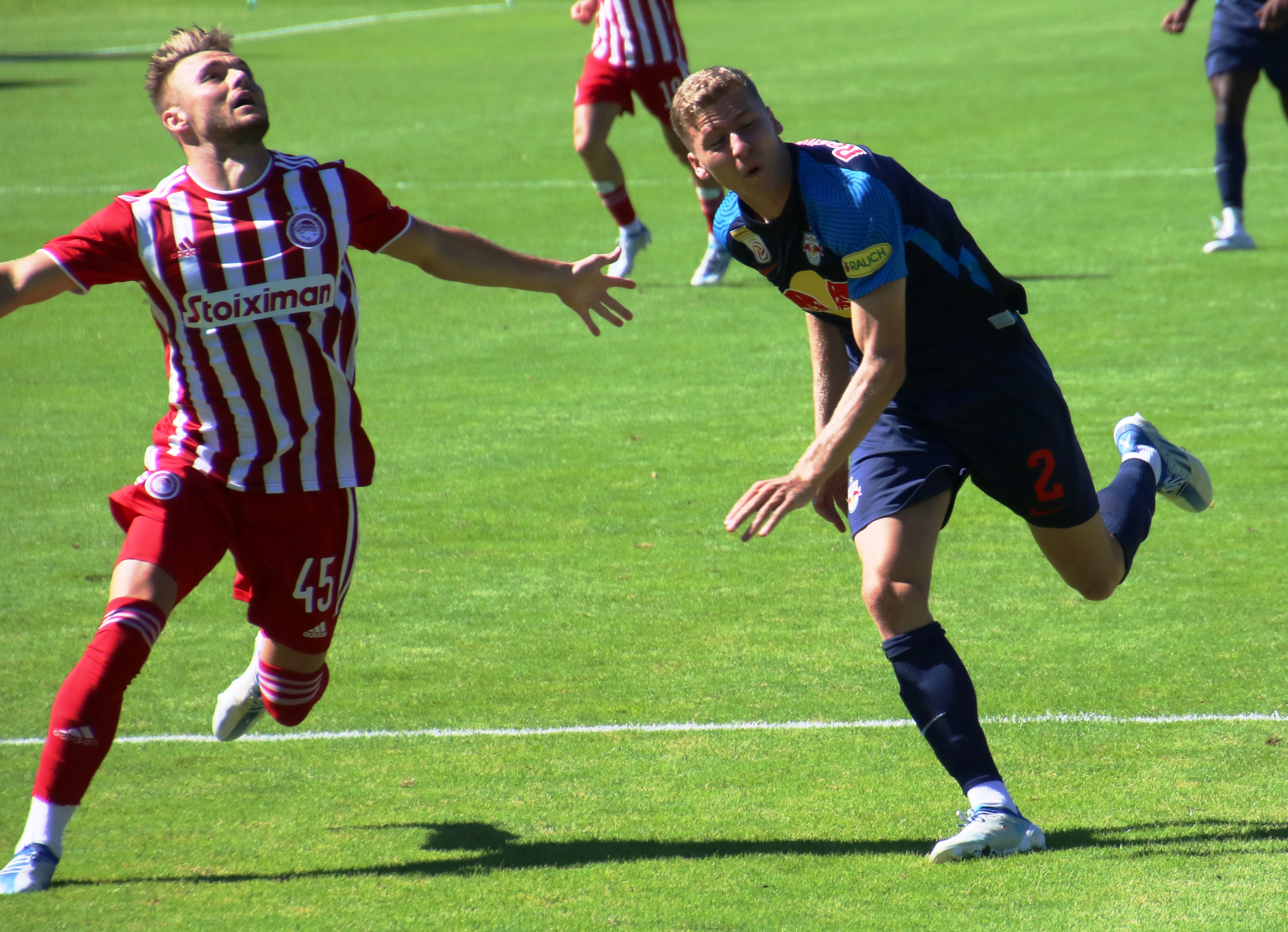
Reabciuk (left) playing for Olympiacos in July 2022

On 1 January 2021, Reabciuk completed a €2 million transfer to Superleague Greece outfit Olympiacos, signing a long-term deal until the summer of 2025. He made his debut five days later in a 4–0 win at Asteras Tripolis as an 85th-minute substitute for José Holebas, and ended the season as a league champion.

On 16 September 2021, Reabciuk scored his first goal for the club in a 2–1 UEFA Europa League home win over Royal Antwerp in the 87th minute. His first league goal came the following 4 May to win 2–1 away to PAOK to lift the title.

=== Spartak Moscow ===
On 7 August 2023, Spartak Moscow announced the transfer of Reabciuk on a three-year contract. He left Spartak as his contract expired in May 2026.

=== Anderlecht ===
On 1 September 2026, Reabciuk signed a three-season contract with Anderlecht in Belgium.

== International career ==
In November 2016, Reabciuk was called up for the Moldova under-19 national team. At that time, he did not have proficiency in the Romanian language, or a Moldovan passport.

Reabciuk was called up by Moldova senior national team manager Alexandru Spiridon in March 2018, for a friendly against the Ivory Coast, while having just ten senior appearances for Porto B to his name. On 27 March, he played 65 minutes in that match, a 2–1 defeat in Beauvais, France, before being replaced. He was Moldovan Footballer of the Year for three consecutive years, 2020, 2021 and 2022.

== Career statistics ==
=== Club ===
As of match played 25 October 2026

Appearances and goals by club, season and competition
Club	Season	League			National cup (Note: Includes Taça de Portugal, Greek Cup, Russian Cup)		League cup (Note: Includes Taça da Liga)		Continental		Total	
Club	Season	Division	Apps	Goals	Apps	Goals	Apps	Goals	Apps	Goals	Apps	Goals
Porto B	2017–18	Liga Portugal 2	15	4	—		—		—		15	4
Porto B	2018–19	Liga Portugal 2	32	0	—		—		—		32	0
Porto B	Total		47	4	—		—		—		47	4
Paços de Ferreira	2019–20	Primeira Liga	26	0	3	0	2	0	—		31	0
Paços de Ferreira	2020–21	Primeira Liga	11	2	1	0	1	0	—		13	2
Paços de Ferreira	Total		37	2	4	0	3	0	—		44	2
Olympiacos	2020–21	Super League Greece	20	0	3	0	—		4 (Note: Appearances in UEFA Europa League)	0	27	0
Olympiacos	2021–22	Super League Greece	32	1	3	0	—		13 (Note: Three appearances in UEFA Champions League, ten appearances and one goal in UEFA Europa League)	1	48	2
Olympiacos	2022–23	Super League Greece	30	1	4	0	—		11 (Note: Two appearances in UEFA Champions League, nine appearances in UEFA Europa League)	0	45	1
Olympiacos	Total		82	2	10	0	—		28	1	120	4
Spartak Moscow	2023–24	Russian Premier League	14	0	6	0	—		—		20	0
Spartak Moscow	2024–25	Russian Premier League	27	0	8	0	—		—		35	0
Spartak Moscow	2025–26	Russian Premier League	10	0	8	0	—		—		18	0
Spartak Moscow	Total		51	0	22	0	—		—		73	0
Anderlecht	2026–27	Belgian Pro League	1	0	0	0	—		2	0	3	0
Career total			218	8	36	0	3	0	30	1	287	9

=== International ===
As of 16 November 2026

Appearances and goals by national team and year
National team	Year	Apps	Goals
Moldova	2018	8	0
Moldova	2019	8	0
Moldova	2020	8	0
Moldova	2021	7	0
Moldova	2022	8	0
Moldova	2023	6	0
Moldova	2024	8	0
Moldova	2025	9	0
Moldova	2026	6	0
Total		68	0

== Honours ==
Olympiacos

- Super League Greece: 2020–21, 2021–22
- Greek Football Cup runner-up: 2020–21

Spartak Moscow

- Russian Cup: 2025–26

Individual

- Moldovan Footballer of the Year: 2020, 2021, 2022
