= Artur Ioniță =

Moldovan footballer (born 1990)

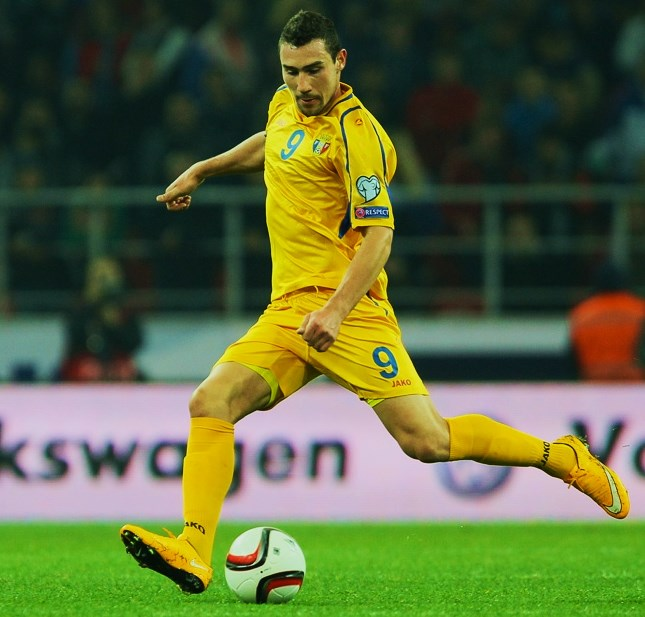
- Ioniță with Moldova in 2014

Personal information
- Date of birth: 17 August 1990 (age 36)
- Place of birth: Chișinău, SSR Moldova, Soviet Union
- Height: 1.82 m (6 ft 0 in)
- Position: Midfielder

Team information
- Current team: Arezzo
- Number: 17

Youth career
- 1997–2007: Zimbru Chișinău

Senior career*
| Years | Team | Apps | (Gls) |
| 2007 | Zimbru Chișinău | 3 | (1) |
| 2008–2009 | Iskra-Stal Rîbnița | 41 | (11) |
| 2009–2014 | Aarau | 142 | (16) |
| 2014–2016 | Hellas Verona | 49 | (6) |
| 2016–2020 | Cagliari | 132 | (6) |
| 2020–2022 | Benevento | 78 | (4) |
| 2022–2024 | Pisa | 16 | (1) |
| 2023 | → Modena (loan) | 10 | (0) |
| 2023–2024 | → Lecco (loan) | 36 | (4) |
| 2024–2025 | Lecco | 15 | (2) |
| 2025–2026 | Triestina | 31 | (9) |
| 2026– | Arezzo | 11 | (2) |

International career^{‡}
| 2009–2012 | Moldova U21 | 22 | (5) |
| 2009–2025 | Moldova | 81 | (5) |
- * Club domestic league appearances and goals as of 30 April 2026 ‡ National team caps and goals as of 16 November 2025

Artur Ioniță (Romanian pronunciation: [arˈtur joˈnitsə]; born 17 August 1990) is a Moldovan professional footballer who plays as a midfielder for Serie B club Arezzo. He has made 81 caps for the Moldova national team.

== Club career ==
=== Early career ===
Ioniță joined Serie A club Hellas Verona in July 2014 on a free transfer. As a footballer of Hellas Verona, he became teammates with one of his idols, Rafael Márquez. After an impressive 2015–16 season in Serie A in which Ioniță scored four goals and provided two assists in 31 matches, he was subject to interest by Juventus, Napoli, and Swansea. In July 2016, Ioniță transferred to newly promoted Serie A club Cagliari.

On 20 August 2020, Ioniță signed a contract with Benevento ahead of their return to Serie A. On 11 August 2022, Ioniță moved to Pisa on a two-year contract. On 31 January 2023, he was loaned to Modena. On 1 September 2023, Ioniță joined Lecco on loan with an option to buy. After being a free agent for two months, he signed a new contract with Lecco on 30 September 2024.

=== Serie C and beyond ===
On 30 January 2025, Ioniță signed a one-and-a-half-year contract with Triestina in Serie C.

== International career ==
In the 2010 FIFA World Cup qualification on 28 March 2009, Ioniță debuted for Moldova in a match against Lithuania. On 5 March 2013, he scored a goal against the same opponent in a friendly match. In November 2025, Ioniță announced his retirement from international football.

== Career statistics ==
=== Club ===
As of match played 4 October 2024

Appearances and goals by club, season and competition
| Club | Season | League | | | National cup | | Other | | Total | |
| Club | Season | Division | Apps | Goals | Apps | Goals | Apps | Goals | Apps | Goals |
|---|---|---|---|---|---|---|---|---|---|---|
| Zimbru Chișinău | 2007–08 | Moldovan National Division | 3 | 0 | – | | – | | 3 | 0 |
| Iskra-Stal | 2008–09 | Moldovan National Division | 41 | 11 | 0 | 0 | – | | 41 | 11 |
| Aarau | 2009–10 | Swiss Super League | 8 | 0 | – | | – | | 8 | 0 |
| Aarau | 2010–11 | Swiss Challenge League | 25 | 0 | – | | – | | 25 | 0 |
| Aarau | 2011–12 | Swiss Challenge League | 27 | 4 | 0 | 0 | 2 (Note: Appearance in promotion/relegation playoff) | 0 | 29 | 4 |
| Aarau | 2012–13 | Swiss Challenge League | 35 | 5 | 2 | 1 | – | | 37 | 6 |
| Aarau | 2013–14 | Swiss Super League | 34 | 6 | 2 | 0 | – | | 36 | 6 |
| Aarau | Total | | 129 | 15 | 4 | 1 | 2 | 0 | 135 | 16 |
| Hellas Verona | 2014–15 | Serie A | 18 | 2 | 1 | 0 | – | | 19 | 2 |
| Hellas Verona | 2015–16 | Serie A | 31 | 4 | 1 | 0 | – | | 35 | 4 |
| Hellas Verona | Total | | 49 | 6 | 2 | 0 | – | | 54 | 6 |
| Cagliari | 2016–17 | Serie A | 18 | 3 | 1 | 0 | – | | 19 | 3 |
| Cagliari | 2017–18 | Serie A | 13 | 0 | 1 | 0 | – | | 14 | 0 |
| Cagliari | 2018–19 | Serie A | 37 | 3 | 2 | 0 | – | | 39 | 3 |
| Cagliari | 2019–20 | Serie A | 34 | 0 | 3 | 0 | – | | 37 | 0 |
| Cagliari | Total | | 102 | 6 | 7 | 0 | – | | 109 | 6 |
| Benevento | 2020–21 | Serie A | 36 | 2 | 1 | 0 | – | | 37 | 2 |
| Benevento | 2021–22 | Serie B | 39 | 2 | 2 | 0 | – | | 41 | 2 |
| Benevento | Total | | 75 | 4 | 3 | 0 | – | | 78 | 4 |
| Pisa | 2022–23 | Serie B | 16 | 1 | 0 | 0 | – | | 16 | 1 |
| Modena (loan) | 2022–23 | Serie B | 10 | 0 | – | | – | | 10 | 0 |
| Lecco (loan) | 2023–24 | Serie B | 36 | 4 | 0 | 0 | – | | 36 | 4 |
| Lecco | 2024–25 | Serie C | 1 | 0 | 0 | 0 | – | | 1 | 0 |
| Lecco | Total | | 37 | 4 | 0 | 0 | – | | 37 | 4 |
| Career totals | | | 449 | 47 | 15 | 1 | 2 | 0 | 469 | 48 |

=== International ===
As of match played 10 October 2024

Appearances and goals by national team and year
| National team | Year | Apps | Goals |
|---|---|---|---|
| Moldova | 2009 | 1 | 0 |
| Moldova | 2013 | 9 | 2 |
| Moldova | 2014 | 8 | 0 |
| Moldova | 2015 | 1 | 0 |
| Moldova | 2016 | 5 | 0 |
| Moldova | 2017 | 5 | 0 |
| Moldova | 2018 | 7 | 1 |
| Moldova | 2019 | 9 | 0 |
| Moldova | 2020 | 8 | 0 |
| Moldova | 2021 | 8 | 0 |
| Moldova | 2022 | 6 | 0 |
| Moldova | 2024 | 7 | 2 |
| Total | | 74 | 5 |

Scores and results list Moldova's goal tally first.

| # | Date | Venue | Opponent | Score | Result | Competition |
|---|---|---|---|---|---|---|
| 1. | 15 October 2013 | Stadion Pod Goricom, Podgorica, Montenegro | Montenegro | 4–1 | 5–2 | 2014 FIFA World Cup qualification |
| 2. | 18 November 2013 | Zimbru Stadium, Chișinău, Moldova | Lithuania | 1–1 | 1–1 | Friendly |
| 3. | 27 March 2018 | Stade Pierre Brisson, Beauvais, France | Ivory Coast | 1–2 | 1–2 | Friendly |
| 4. | 26 March 2024 | Mardan Sports Complex, Antalya, Turkey | Cayman Islands | 2–0 | 4–0 | Friendly |
| 5. | 10 October 2024 | Zimbru Stadium, Chișinău, Moldova | Andorra | 1–0 | 2–0 | 2024–25 UEFA Nations League |

== Honours ==
- Aarau: 2012–13
- Individual: Moldovan Footballer of the Year: 2014, 2019
