= Serghei Cleșcenco =

Moldovan footballer

Personal information
- Date of birth: 20 May 1972 (age 54)
- Place of birth: Criuleni, Moldavian SSR, Soviet Union
- Height: 1.74 m (5 ft 9 in)
- Position: Forward

Team information
- Current team: Moldova U20 (head coach)

Senior career*
Years	Team	Apps	(Gls)
1990	Spartak Oryol	14	(1)
1990–1992	Nistru Chișinău	23	(1)
1992–1996	Zimbru Chișinău	131	(40)
1996–1997	Go Ahead Eagles	62	(9)
1997–1998	Zimbru Chișinău	20	(25)
1998	Zenit Saint Petersburg	6	(0)
1998–1999	Zimbru Chișinău	8	(0)
1999–2001	Maccabi Haifa	102	(42)
2001–2003	Hapoel Tel Aviv	62	(22)
2003	Chernomorets Novorossiysk	6	(0)
2003–2004	Bnei Yehuda Tel Aviv	14	(1)
2004–2005	Zimbru Chișinău	18	(1)
2005–2006	Sibir Novosibirsk	44	(8)
2007–2008	Metallurg-Kuzbass Novokuznetsk	33	(1)
Total		543	(151)

International career
1991–2006	Moldova	69	(11)

Managerial career
- 2008–2010: Moldova U17
- 2010–2011: Moldova U19
- 2011–2012: Milsami Orhei
- 2012: Milsami Orhei (assistant)
- 2013: Zimbru Chișinău (executive assistant)
- 2013: Zimbru Chișinău
- 2013–2015: Zimbru Chișinău (executive assistant)
- 2015–2017: União Leiria (assistant)
- 2017: União Leiria (caretaker)
- 2017: Rostov (assistant)
- 2019–2020: Moldova U21
- 2019–2021: Moldova (assistant)
- 2021: Moldova U21 (caretaker)
- 2021–2025: Moldova
- 2026–: Moldova U20
- * Club domestic league appearances and goals

Serghei Cleșcenco (pronounced [kleʃˈtʃeŋko]; born 20 May 1972) is a Moldovan football coach and a former player. He is the current head coach of the Moldova national under-20 team. He was the head coach of the Moldova national team, for which he held the records for most goals as a player.

He holds the record for the most goals scored in a single season by a foreigner in Israel. He is a former manager of Zimbru Chișinău, where he also spent large parts of his playing career.

== Playing career ==
Aged 17, Cleșcenco made his debut for Nistru Chișinău as substitute in the 72nd minute in a 1990 Soviet First League match against Kotayk Abovyan. He played for half of the season at Spartak Oryol, where he was invited by the Moldovan coach Valentin Goian. In the following season of the Soviet First League he played for Zimbru Chișinău.

From 1992 to 1996 Cleșcenco played in the Moldovan National Division, winning the championship four times. He made his debut in the National Division in a match against Speranţa Nisporeni in which he scored. In 1994 he was chosen as the Moldovan Footballer of the Year, and also the best Moldovan forward in 1994, 1995, 1998 and 1999. In 1996 he joined the Dutch side Go Ahead Eagles, for which he played two seasons. He scored a brace in a 2–2 draw against Feyenoord. Cleșcenco returned to Zimbru, which won the Moldovan double in the 1997–98 season. He scored 25 goals in 20 matches, being the top goal scorer in the National Division.

After a successful period with Zimbru, Cleșcenco was taken on trial by English club Watford in early 1998. He impressed, but work permit issues, along with Zimbru Chișinău asking for too much money prevented the deal from going through.

In 1998 Cleșcenco joined Zenit St. Petersburg. He debuted on 1 July as a substitute in a 5–0 win over FC Tyumen. During the half of the year he spent at the club, he played only 175 minutes in 7 matches. After returning to Zimbru he played 8 more matches.

In 1999, Cleșcenco joined Maccabi Haifa. It was one of the most successful starts ever for a foreigner in Israel as he bagged 22 goals in his first season topping the record set by Polish striker Andrzej Kubica for most goals scored by a foreigner in Israel in a single season. After another strong season in Haifa, he moved to Hapoel Tel Aviv, where he was part of the squad that reached the quarter-finals of the UEFA Cup. He scored one of the goals as they memorably knocked out Chelsea. He was nicknamed "Kalashnikov" by the Israeli fans after scoring four goals during 30 minutes in a 5–2 win over Hapoel Petah Tikva.

In 2003 Cleșcenco transferred to Chernomorets Novorossiysk. After 6 matches for the Russian side, he returned to Israel, signing for Bnei Yehuda Tel Aviv, scoring one goal in 14 appearances. The following season he returned to Zimbru, scoring one goal in 18 matches. Cleșcenco spent the rest of his playing career in Russia, playing for Sibir Novosibirsk and Metallurg-Kuzbass Novokuznetsk.

== International career ==
Aged 19, Cleșcenco made his international debut as a substitution in Moldova's first official match, a 2–4 loss against Georgia in 1991. He scored his first goals for the national team as a brace in a 2–1 win over Azerbaijan in a friendly match. In a 2006 friendly against Lithuania he scored his 11th and last goal for the national team, remaining Moldova's top goalscorer until 2023. In the same year, he made his 69th and last appearance for Moldova against Bosnia and Herzegovina in UEFA Euro 2008 qualification, which was another record at the time.

== Managerial career ==
Cleșcenco started his managerial career in 2008 at Moldova under-16 and under-17 teams. He led the Moldova under-19 team to 2011 UEFA European Under-19 Championship elite qualification. In 2012 he won the Moldovan Cup and Moldovan Super Cup with Milsami Orhei. From 2012 to 2014 he was executive assistant at Zimbru Chișinău. During this period the club won the Moldovan Cup and Moldovan Super Cup. In 2014 he was invited by Alexander Tolstikov to work at União Leiria. He worked as a sporting director and assistant coach. In 2017 he was Leonid Kuchuk's assistant at Rostov.

From 2018 to 2020 he headed the Moldova under-20 and under-21 teams. Between 2019 and 2021, Cleșcenco was an assistant coach to Engin Fırat and Roberto Bordin at Moldova's national team. He became the head coach on 3 December 2021. He debuted in a match against Kazakhstan in 2020–21 UEFA Nations League relegation play-outs. The Moldovans lost at penalties and were relegated to 2022–23 UEFA Nations League D. Moldova placed second in its group, being tied to points with Latvia, but had a lower goal difference, failing to achieve promotion.

In UEFA Euro 2024 qualifying Moldova obtained a historic shock 3–2 comeback win over Poland. Moldova acquired ten points in a group of five, and also were undefeated at home throughout the qualification. However, the Moldovans did not achieve qualification.

On 11 September 2025, following an 11–1 loss to Norway two days earlier, Cleșcenco resigned from his position.

== Personal life ==
Cleșcenco's son, Nicky Cleșcenco, is also a footballer who plays for the Moldova national team.

== International goals ==
Scores and results list Moldova's goal tally first.

List of international goals scored by Serghei Cleșcenco
#	Date	Venue	Opponent	Score	Result	Competition
1	1 September 1994	Stadionul Republican, Chișinău	Azerbaijan	1–0	2–1	Friendly
2	1 September 1994	Stadionul Republican, Chișinău	Azerbaijan	2–0	2–1	Friendly
3	16 November 1994	Vasil Levski National Stadium, Sofia	Bulgaria	1–1	1–4	UEFA Euro 1996 qualifier
4	7 June 1995	Stadionul Republican, Chișinău	Albania	2–1	2–3	UEFA Euro 1996 qualifier
5	10 November 1996	Stadion GKS, Katowice	Poland	1–2	1–2	1998 FIFA World Cup qualifier
6	20 August 1998	Spordikeskuse Staadion, Kohtla-Järve	Estonia	1–0	1–0	Friendly
7	18 August 1999	Népstadion, Budapest	Hungary	1–1	1–1	Friendly
8	26 April 2000	Stadio Olimpico, Serravalle	San Marino	1–0	1–0	Friendly
9	1 September 2001	Stadionul Republican, Chișinău	Azerbaijan	1–0	2–0	2002 FIFA World Cup qualifier
10	5 September 2001	Štadión na Sihoti, Trenčín	Slovakia	1–0	2–4	2002 FIFA World Cup qualifier
11	16 August 2006	Stadionul Zimbru, Chișinău	Lithuania	3–2	3–2	Friendly

== Honours ==
=== Player ===
Zimbru Chișinău

- Moldovan National Division: 1992, 1992–93, 1993–94, 1994–95, 1995–96, 1997–98
- Moldovan Cup: 1997–98

Maccabi Haifa

- Israeli Premier League: 2000–01

Hapoel Tel Aviv

- Toto Cup: 2001–02

Individual

- Moldovan Footballer of the Year: 1994, 2000

=== Manager ===
Milsami

- Moldovan Cup: 2011–12
- Moldovan Super Cup: 2012

== Managerial Statistics ==
As of match played on 9 September 2025

Team	Period	Record				
Team	Period	G	W	D	L	Win %
Moldova	2021–2025	38	12	8	18	31.58
