= Ion Caras =

Moldovan footballer and manager

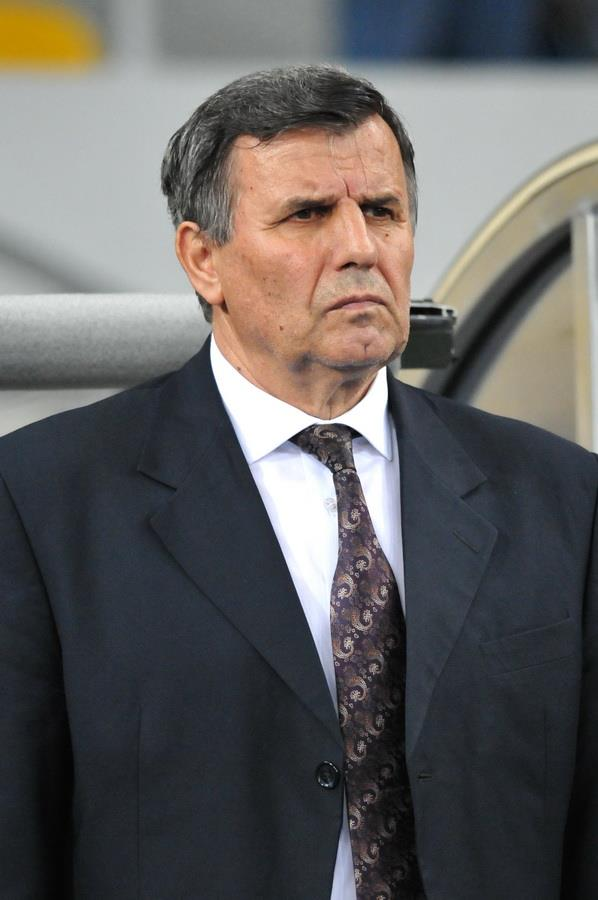
- Caras in 2014

Personal information
- Date of birth: 11 September 1950 (age 76)
- Place of birth: Bălți, Moldavian SSR, Soviet Union
- Height: 1.78 m (5 ft 10 in)
- Position: Defender

Senior career*
Years	Team	Apps	(Gls)
- Aeroflot Irkutsk
- Speranța Drochia
1971–1986	Nistru Chișinău	376	(26)

Managerial career
- 1990–1991: Tighina-Apoel
- 1991: Zimbru Chișinău
- 1991–1992: Moldova
- 1992–1997: Moldova
- Constructorul Chişinău
- Agro-Goliador Chișinău
- –2000: Nistru Otaci
- 2000–: Sporting USM Chişinău
- –2008: Politehnica Chişinău
- 2008–2009: Zimbru Chișinău
- 2012–2014: Moldova
- * Club domestic league appearances and goals

Ion Caras (born 11 September 1950) is a Moldovan former footballer and former manager of the Moldova national team. Under Ion Caras, in 51 matches Moldova gathered 10 victories, 10 draws and 31 losses.
