= Ion Nicolaescu =

Moldovan footballer (born 1998)

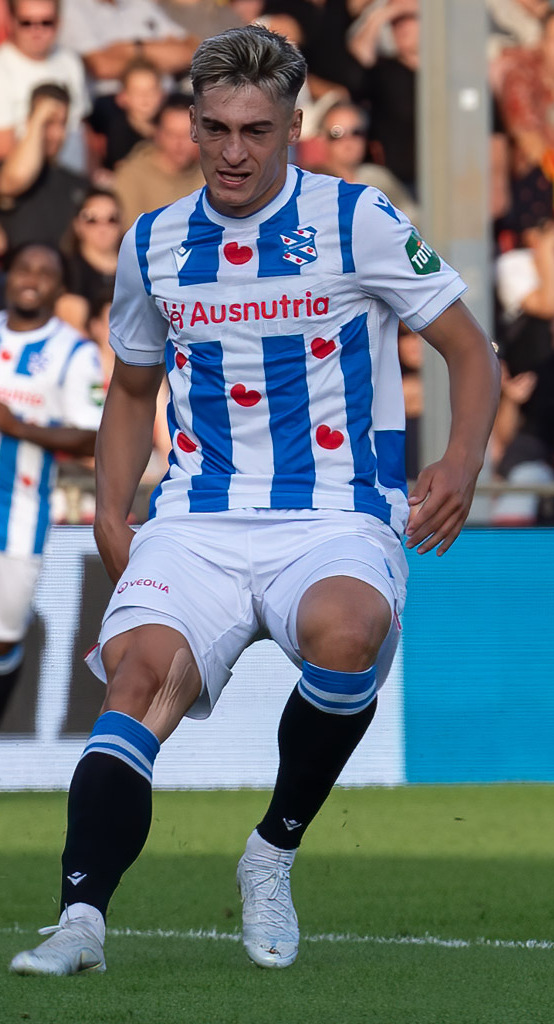
- Nicolaescu with Heerenveen in 2023

Personal information
- Date of birth: 7 September 1998 (age 28)
- Place of birth: Badicul Moldovenesc, Moldova
- Height: 1.84 m (6 ft 0 in)
- Position: Forward

Team information
- Current team: Maccabi Tel Aviv
- Number: 98

Youth career
- 2008–2014: Cahul-2005
- 2014–2016: Zimbru Chișinău

Senior career*
| Years | Team | Apps | (Gls) |
| 2016–2017 | Zimbru-2 Chișinău | 37 | (13) |
| 2016–2018 | Zimbru Chișinău | 25 | (5) |
| 2018–2020 | Shakhtyor Soligorsk | 13 | (0) |
| 2020 | → Vitebsk (loan) | 18 | (9) |
| 2020–2022 | DAC Dunajská Streda | 39 | (5) |
| 2022 | → Maccabi Petah Tikva (loan) | 15 | (5) |
| 2022–2023 | Beitar Jerusalem | 27 | (15) |
| 2023–2025 | Heerenveen | 45 | (14) |
| 2025– | Maccabi Tel Aviv | 9 | (2) |

International career^{‡}
| 2016 | Moldova U19 (Note: Only official UEFA matches included) | 2 | (0) |
| 2018 | Moldova U21 | 1 | (0) |
| 2018– | Moldova | 56 | (18) |
- * Club domestic league appearances and goals as of 7 December 2025 ‡ National team caps and goals as of 16 November 2025

Ion Nicolaescu (born 7 September 1998) is a Moldovan professional footballer who plays as a forward for Israeli Premier League club Maccabi Tel Aviv and the Moldova national team.

He is the all-time leading goal scorer for his country, and was named Moldovan Footballer of the Year in 2023, 2024 and 2025.

== Club career ==
=== Zimbru Chișinău ===
On 20 May 2016, Nicolaescu made his professional debut for Zimbru Chișinău in the Divizia Națională against Academia Chișinău, coming on as a 65th-minute substitute. In the 2018 Moldovan National Division, he scored 5 goals in 12 appearances and reached the final of the 2017–18 Moldovan Cup.

=== Shakhtyor Soligorsk ===
Nicolaescu joined Shakhtyor Soligorsk in August 2018. However, he was used as a substitute and didn't score a single goal for the Belarusian club. Of his 15 appearances over two seasons, he started in only three. In an interview, Nicolaescu said that this was due to the general director and the coach having a falling out. He won the 2018–19 Belarusian Cup, playing in both legs of the quarter-finals.

=== Vitebsk ===
In January 2020, Nicolaescu went on loan to the Belarusian team Vitebsk. He was the team's top goal scorer in the 2020 Belarusian Premier League, scoring 9 goals in 18 matches.

=== DAC Dunajská Streda ===
Nicolaescu joined DAC Dunajská Streda of Fortuna Liga in September 2020. After mere two days with the club he contributed with two goals to a 5–3 victory over Jablonec, advancing the Slovak side to the Third Round of UEFA Europa League qualifying.

=== Maccabi Petah Tikva ===
In January 2022, Nicolaescu was loaned to Israeli Premier League club Maccabi Petah Tikva. During his loan spell, he scored 5 goals and provided 3 assists in 17 appearances. He returned to DAC in June 2022.

=== Beitar Jerusalem ===
In September 2022, Nicolaescu returned to Israel and signed with Beitar Jerusalem. He scored 15 league goals and 3 goals in Israel State Cup during the 2022–23 season, helping Beitar Jerusalem win the Israeli State Cup. His three goals in the State Cup games, one against Kafr Qasim on 11 December 2022, one against Hapoel Afula, on 1 February 2023, during the 4–0 win and another goal at the finals against Maccabi Netanya. Nicolaescu scored four goals in a 6–3 win over Maccabi Netanya in an Israeli Premier League match.

=== Heerenveen ===
On 7 August 2023, the Dutch side Heerenveen announced that it had signed Nicolaescu to a three-year contract. Five days later he scored the opening goal in his debut, a 3–1 win over RKC Waalwijk. In his second season, Nicolaescu opened his account by scoring a brace in a 4–0 win over NAC Breda after coming on as a substitute in the 66th minute. He scored the winner in his Derby of the North debut, a 2–1 win over Groningen. With 12 goals in 29 appearances, Nicolaescu was the club's top scorer in both Eredivisie and KNVB Cup.

=== Maccabi Tel Aviv ===
On 25 June 2025, Nicolaescu signed with Maccabi Tel Aviv, the Israeli Premier League champions.

== International career ==
Nicolaescu debuted for Moldova on 8 September 2018 against Luxembourg in 2018–19 UEFA Nations League, coming on as a substitute in the 62nd minute. He scored his first goal for the national team against Kosovo in 2020–21 UEFA Nations League, which was Moldova's only goal in the league phase. He was Moldova's top goal scorer in 2022 FIFA World Cup qualification and 2022–23 UEFA Nations League, scoring 3 out of 5 and 4 out of 10 team's goals, respectively.

Nicolaescu became Moldova's top goal scorer after scoring his 11th and 12th goals in a 3–2 win over Poland in UEFA Euro 2024 qualifying. With 4 goals in the competition, he became the first Moldovan to be the top goal scorer of a qualifying group.

== Career statistics ==
=== International ===
As of match played 16 November 2025

Appearances and goals by national team and year
| National team | Year | Apps | Goals |
|---|---|---|---|
| Moldova | 2018 | 4 | 0 |
| Moldova | 2019 | 3 | 0 |
| Moldova | 2020 | 6 | 1 |
| Moldova | 2021 | 10 | 3 |
| Moldova | 2022 | 8 | 5 |
| Moldova | 2023 | 10 | 5 |
| Moldova | 2024 | 8 | 2 |
| Moldova | 2025 | 7 | 2 |
| Total | | 56 | 18 |

Scores and results list Moldova's goal tally first, score column indicates score after each Nicolaescu goal.

List of international goals scored by Ion Nicolaescu
| No. | Date | Venue | Opponent | Score | Result | Competition |
|---|---|---|---|---|---|---|
| 1 | 3 September 2020 | Stadio Ennio Tardini, Parma, Italy | Kosovo | 1–0 | 1–1 | 2020–21 UEFA Nations League C |
| 2 | 25 March 2021 | Stadionul Zimbru, Chișinău, Moldova | Faroe Islands | 1–0 | 1–1 | 2022 FIFA World Cup qualification |
| 3 | 12 October 2021 | Turner Stadium, Be'er Sheva, Israel | Israel | 1–2 | 1–2 | 2022 FIFA World Cup qualification |
| 4 | 15 November 2021 | Wörthersee Stadion, Klagenfurt, Austria | Austria | 1–3 | 1–4 | 2022 FIFA World Cup qualification |
| 5 | 24 March 2022 | Stadionul Zimbru, Chișinău, Moldova | Kazakhstan | 1–0 | 1–2 | 2020–21 UEFA Nations League |
| 6 | 3 June 2022 | Rheinpark Stadion, Vaduz, Liechtenstein | Liechtenstein | 1–0 | 2–0 | 2022–23 UEFA Nations League D |
| 7 | 10 June 2022 | Stadionul Zimbru, Chișinău, Moldova | Latvia | 1–0 | 2–4 | 2022–23 UEFA Nations League D |
| 8 | 14 June 2022 | Stadionul Zimbru, Chișinău, Moldova | Andorra | 2–1 | 2–1 | 2022–23 UEFA Nations League D |
| 9 | 22 September 2022 | Skonto Stadium, Riga, Latvia | Latvia | 2–0 | 2–1 | 2022–23 UEFA Nations League D |
| 10 | 24 March 2023 | Stadionul Zimbru, Chișinău, Moldova | Faroe Islands | 1–1 | 1–1 | UEFA Euro 2024 qualifying |
| 11 | 20 June 2023 | Stadionul Zimbru, Chișinău | Poland | 1–2 | 3–2 | UEFA Euro 2024 qualifying |
| 12 | 20 June 2023 | Stadionul Zimbru, Chișinău | Poland | 2–2 | 3–2 | UEFA Euro 2024 qualifying |
| 13 | 12 October 2023 | Friends Arena, Stockholm, Sweden | Sweden | 1–2 | 1–3 | Friendly |
| 14 | 15 October 2023 | Kazimierz Górski National Stadium, Warsaw, Poland | Poland | 1–0 | 1–1 | UEFA Euro 2024 qualifying |
| 15 | 26 March 2024 | Mardan Sports Complex, Antalya, Turkey | Cayman Islands | 3–0 | 4–0 | Friendly |
| 16 | 7 September 2024 | Stadionul Zimbru, Chișinău, Moldova | Malta | 2–0 | 2–0 | 2024–25 UEFA Nations League D |
| 17 | 25 March 2025 | Stadionul Zimbru, Chișinău, Moldova | Estonia | 1–2 | 2–3 | 2026 FIFA World Cup qualification |
| 18 | 16 November 2025 | Stadionul Zimbru, Chișinău, Moldova | Israel | 1–1 | 1–4 | 2026 FIFA World Cup qualification |

== Honours ==
=== Club ===
Zimbru Chișinău

- Moldovan Cup runner-up: 2017–18

Shakhtyor Soligorsk

- Belarusian Premier League runner-up: 2018
- Belarusian Cup: 2018–19

DAC Dunajská Streda

- Slovak First Football League runner-up: 2020–21

Beitar Jerusalem

- Israel State Cup: 2022–23
- Israel Super Cup runner-up: 2023

Maccabi Tel Aviv

- Israel Super Cup runner-up: 2025

=== Individual ===
- Moldovan Footballer of the Year: 2023, 2024, 2025

== See also ==
- List of top international men's football goalscorers by country
