= Alexandru Mațiura =

Moldovan footballer and manager

Personal information
- Date of birth: 24 October 1954 (age 71)
- Place of birth: Edineț, Moldavian SSR, Soviet Union
- Height: 1.78 m (5 ft 10 in)
- Position: Midfielder

Senior career*
Years	Team	Apps	(Gls)
1974	Nistru Chișinău	2	(0)
1976–1985	Nistru Chișinău	260	(41)
1985	Zaria Bălți	15	(3)
1986	Tekstilshchik Tiraspol	8	(0)
1986–1987	Nistru Chișinău	46	(1)
1988	Zaria Bălți	3	(0)
Total		334	(45)

Managerial career
- 1988–1989: Zaria Bălți (assistant)
- 1991: Zimbru Chișinău (assistant)
- 2007: Rubin Kazan (VP)
- 2008–2009: Rubin Kazan (assistant)
- 2010–2013: Rubin Kazan (scout)
- 2015–2017: Rostov (assistant)
- 2017–2019: Rubin Kazan (assistant)
- * Club domestic league appearances and goals

Alexandru Mațiura (born 24 October 1954) is a Moldovan professional football manager and a former player.

== Honours ==
- Coach of the year in Moldova (1): 2001
