= Alexandru Spiridon =

Moldovan footballer and manager

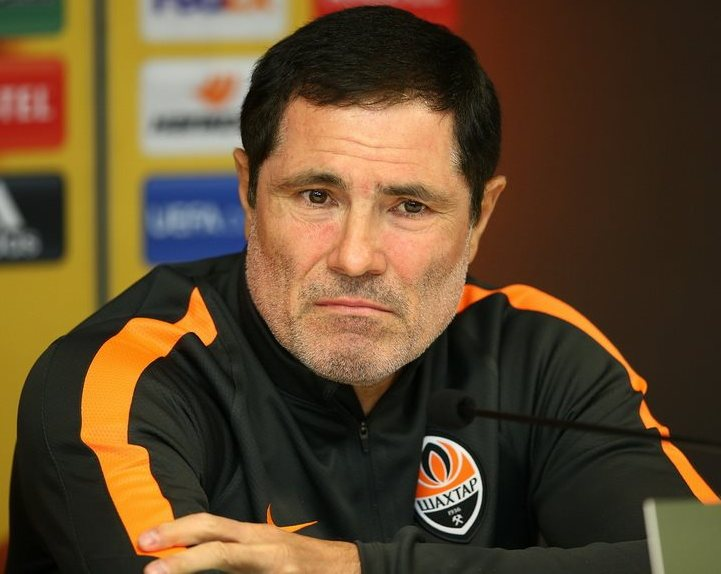
- Spiridon in 2016

Personal information
- Date of birth: 20 July 1960 (age 66)
- Place of birth: Edineț, Moldavian SSR, Soviet Union
- Height: 1.88 m (6 ft 2 in)
- Position: Midfielder

Senior career*
Years	Team	Apps	(Gls)
1976–1981	Nistru Chișinău	54	(2)
1982	SKA Kiev	34	(3)
1983	Zorya Voroshylovhrad	4	(0)
1983–1986	Nistru Chișinău	84	(7)
1987–1990	Zaria Bălți	133	(48)
1991	Zimbru Chișinău	32	(5)
1992–1996	Zimbru Chișinău	85	(42)
1996–1997	Tiligul Tiraspol	7	(6)
Total		433	(113)

International career
1992–1995	Moldova	16	(2)

Managerial career
- 1994–1996: Zimbru Chișinău
- 1994–2000: Moldova (assistant)
- 1997–1999: Tiligul Tiraspol
- 2000–2001: Moldova U21
- 2001: Moldova
- 2000–2001: Zimbru Chișinău
- 2002–2004: Nistru Otaci
- 2004–2016: Shakhtar Donetsk (assistant)
- 2016–2017: Zenit Saint Petersburg (assistant)
- 2018–2019: Moldova
- * Club domestic league appearances and goals

Alexandru Spiridon (born 20 July 1960) is a former professional footballer and current football manager from Moldova. Spiridon played as a midfielder during his football career, winning the Moldovan Footballer of the Year award in 1992. He made 16 appearances for the national team, scoring one goal. He worked as the assistant manager at Russian club Zenit Saint Petersburg, joining the club in 2016 with manager Mircea Lucescu.

== Playing career ==
Spiridon played as a midfielder during his football career, winning the Moldovan Footballer of the Year award in 1992. He began his career at Nistru Chișinău, where his progression was hampered by a baldy broken leg, before moving to SKA Kiev in 1982. He scored 3 goals in 34 games for the club. Spiridon rejoined Nistru Chișinău in 1983 and played 19 times in his first season. He made 16 appearances the following year, and played 23 times for the club in 1985, scoring 4 goals. In 1986, he played 27 matches and scored 3 goals. He joined Zarya Bălți in 1987 and moved to Zimbru Chișinău in 1991. He was named the Moldovan Footballer of the Year award in 1992 and scored 12 goals in 30 appearances in the 1992-93 season. In the 1993-94 season, he scored 13 goals in 20 games for the club. He won five league titles in a row with the club between 1992 and 1996. He joined Tiligul Tiraspol in 1996 and ended his playing career with the club.

Spiridon made 16 appearances for the national team, scoring two goals. On 2 July, in a friendly match against Georgia he scored the first goal in the history of recently created national team. He played his last international match on 29 March 1995 in a 3–0 defeat to Albania.

== Managerial career ==
Spiridon joined Ukrainian side Shakhtar Donetsk in 2004 as the assistant manager to Mircea Lucescu. Shakhtar won the Ukrainian Premier League title in the 2004–05 season. Shakhtar have won the league seven times during Spiridon's time as assistant manager (2004–05, 2005–06, 2007–08, 2009–10, 2010–11, 2011–12, 2012–13). They have also won four Ukrainian Cup trophies (2007–08, 2010–11, 2011–12, 2012–13) and five Ukrainian Super Cup trophies (2005, 2008, 2011, 2012, 2013). Shakhtar also won their first European trophy in the 2008–09 UEFA Cup, the last UEFA Cup before its rebranding as the UEFA Europa League.

When on 24 May 2016, Mircea Lucescu signed a contract with Russian club Zenit Saint Petersburg, Spiridon also moved to that club as assistant manager to Lucescu.

== Career statistics ==
International goals of Alexandru Spiridon
#	Date	Venue	Opponent	Score	Result	Competition
1.	2 July 1991	Stadionul Republican, Chișinău, Moldova	Georgia	1–2	2–4	Friendly
2.	22 August 1992	Amman International Stadium, Amman, Jordan	Sudan	1–0	2–1	Friendly

== Managerial statistics ==
As of 11 June 2019

Team	From	To	Record				
Team	From	To	G	W	D	L	Win %
Moldova	2018	2019	15	3	5	7	20.00
Total			15	3	5	7	20.00

== Honours ==
=== As player ===
Zimbru Chișinău

- Divizia Națională

Champion (5): 1992, 1992–93, 1993–94, 1994–95, 1995–96
Runner-up (1): 1996–97

- Moldovan Cup

Winner (1): 1996–97

- Moldovan Footballer of the Year (1): 1992

=== As assistant manager ===
Shakhtar Donetsk

- UEFA Cup

Winner (1): 2008–09

- Ukrainian Premier League

Champion (8): 2004–05, 2005–06, 2007–08, 2009–10, 2010–11, 2011–12, 2012–13, 2013–14
Runner-up (4): 2006–07, 2008–09, 2014–15, 2015–16

- Ukrainian Cup

Winner (6): 2003–04, 2007–08, 2010–11, 2011–12, 2012–13, 2015–16

- Ukrainian Super Cup

Winner (7): 2005, 2008, 2010, 2012, 2013, 2014, 2015
