= Radu Rebeja =

Moldovan footballer

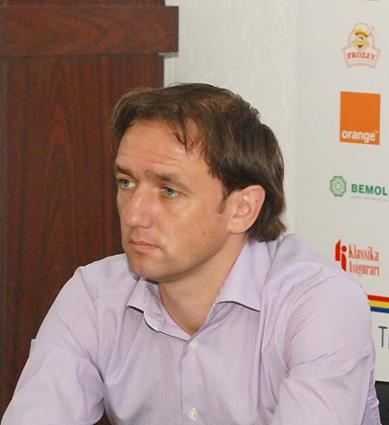
- Rebeja in 2015

Member of the Moldovan Parliament
- In office 19 December 2019 – 23 July 2021
- Preceded by: Constantin Botnari
- Parliamentary group: Democratic Party

Personal details
- Born: 8 June 1973 (age 53) Chişinău, Moldavian SSR, Soviet Union
Association football career
- Height: 1.85 m (6 ft 1 in)
- Position: Midfielder
Senior career*
Years	Team	Apps	(Gls)
1991–1999	Zimbru Chișinău	195	(43)
1999–2000	Uralan Elista	52	(0)
2001–2003	Saturn Ramenskoye	81	(1)
2004–2008	Moscow	110	(3)
2008	Khimki	8	(0)
Total		446	(47)
International career
1991–2008	Moldova	74	(2)
- * Club domestic league appearances and goals

Radu Rebeja (born 8 June 1973) is a Moldovan former football player who played as defensive midfielder or centre-back. He has been a leader and captain of the Moldova national team for 74 matches and was formerly the captain of FC Moscow.

== Awards ==
In 2006, he was awarded the Moldovan Footballer of the Year award. Rebeja is also one of the most capped Moldova national football team players.

Rebeja was one of the 11 Moldovan football players to be challenged to a game of tennis by Tony Hawks and is featured in his 2012 book Playing the Moldovans at Tennis.

== Post-football achievements ==
In 2008, he ended his career as a professional football player and became the Vice President of the Moldovan Football Federation.

In 2015, he took up the post of Adviser for Youth and Sports to the Prime Minister of Moldova, Chiril Gaburici.

In 2018, he was selected as the Secretary of State in the Ministry of Education, Culture and Research.

In 2019, he became an independent deputy in the Parliament of Moldova.

In August 2019, he opened a professional football academy called Academia de Fotbal Radu Rebeja (The Radu Rebeja Football Academy).

== International goals ==
Scores and results list Moldova's goal tally first.

No	Date	Venue	Opponent	Score	Result	Competition
1.	8 October 1995	Ulrich Haberland Stadion, Leverkusen, Germany	Germany	1–6	1–6	Euro 1996 qualifier
2.	5 September 2001	FK Ozeta Dukla Stadium, Trenčín, Slovakia	Slovakia	2–4	2–4	2002 World Cup qualifier
