= Moldova national football team =

Men's association football team

Moldova
- Nickname: Tricolorii (The Tricolours)
- Association: Federația Moldovenească de Fotbal (FMF)
- Confederation: UEFA (Europe)
- Head coach: Lilian Popescu
- Captain: Vladislav Baboglo
- Most caps: Alexandru Epureanu (100)
- Top scorer: Ion Nicolaescu (18)
- Home stadium: Zimbru Stadium
- FIFA code: MDA
First colours	Second colours	Third colours

FIFA ranking
- Current: 157 ▲1 (18 November 2026)
- Highest: 37 (April 2008)
- Lowest: 181 (October 2021 – February 2022)

First international
- Unofficial; Moldova 2–4 Georgia (Chișinău, Soviet Union; 2 July 1991); Official; United States 1–1 Moldova (Jacksonville, United States; 16 April 1994)

Biggest win
- Pakistan 0–5 Moldova (Amman, Jordan; 18 August 1992)

Biggest defeat
- Norway 11–1 Moldova (Oslo, Norway; 9 September 2025)
- Website: fmf.md (in Romanian)

The Moldova national football team (Romanian: Echipa națională de fotbal a Moldovei) represents Moldova in men's international football and is administered by the Moldovan Football Federation, the governing body for football in Moldova. Moldova's home ground is Zimbru Stadium in Chișinău. Shortly before the break-up of the Soviet Union, they played their first match against Georgia on 2 July 1991.

Two of their three best results in the 2020s came during the qualifiers for UEFA Euro 2024, with a win over Poland (3–2) in Chișinău, coming back from a 0–2 deficit, and a draw against Czech Republic (0–0) in Chișinău. In 2007, Moldova upset Hungary 3–0 in Chișinău in Euro 2008 qualifying. Another notable result was a 5–2 win over Montenegro during 2014 FIFA World Cup qualifying. The team has never qualified for the final stages of the UEFA European Championship nor the FIFA World Cup since first entering qualifying in 1994.

Following Moldova's 4–0 defeat to England in September 1997, British writer and comedian Tony Hawks travelled to Moldova to challenge and beat all 11 Moldovan international footballers at tennis. The feature film version of the book of the same name, Playing the Moldovans at Tennis, was filmed in and around Chișinău in May and June 2010 and was released in the spring of 2012.

== History ==
=== 1990s ===
The Moldovan Football Federation was founded in 1990. However, the national football team of Moldova did not play an official international match until 1991, when Moldova lost 4–2 to Georgia. Alexandru Spiridon was the first player to score a goal in the team's history.

Moldova entered the 1992 Jordan International Tournament, a tournament consisting of friendly matches. Moldova obtained its biggest win to date, a 5–0 victory against Pakistan, in which Serghei Alexandrov scored four goals, this being Moldova's first hat-trick. Moldova's second hat-trick was scored by Iurie Miterev in a 3–1 win against Congo in the same tournament.

Moldova became a UEFA member in 1993 and a FIFA member in 1994. Moldova's first match recognised by FIFA was a 1–1 draw against the United States. Moldova's first attempt to qualify for an international tournament was in UEFA Euro 1996 qualifying, its first competitive match being a 1–0 win over Georgia. The Moldovans beat Georgia twice and Wales once, placing 4th out of 6 and failing to qualify. Moldova's following qualifying campaign, their first attempt to qualify for the FIFA World Cup, was the 1998 qualifiers, but they lost all matches, placing last in the group. Moldova also placed last in UEFA Euro 2000 qualifying. The Moldovans obtained 4 draws, two with Northern Ireland, one each with Turkey and Finland.

=== 2000s ===
In 2002 FIFA World Cup qualification Moldova lost 6–0 against Sweden, which stood as its biggest defeat for almost 20 years. Moldova was the second-last team in the group above Azerbaijan, which it beat 2–0. In UEFA Euro 2004 qualifying the Moldovans beat Austria and Belarus, placing above the latter in the group. Moldova finished last in 2006 FIFA World Cup qualification, however it drew with Norway and Scotland.

In a 2006 friendly against Lithuania, Serghei Cleșcenco scored his 11th and last goal, remaining Moldova's top goalscorer until 2023. In UEFA Euro 2008 qualifying Moldova finished fifth in the seven-team Group C with 12 points, beating Bosnia and Herzegovina 1–0 and Hungary 3–0. Following these qualifiers Moldova placed 37th in April 2008 FIFA Ranking, the highest position it ever reached. In 2010 FIFA World Cup qualification the Moldovans placed last in the group. They drew with Greece once and Luxembourg twice. Between the games for these qualifiers Moldova beat Armenia 4–1 in Yerevan in a friendly match.

=== 2010s ===
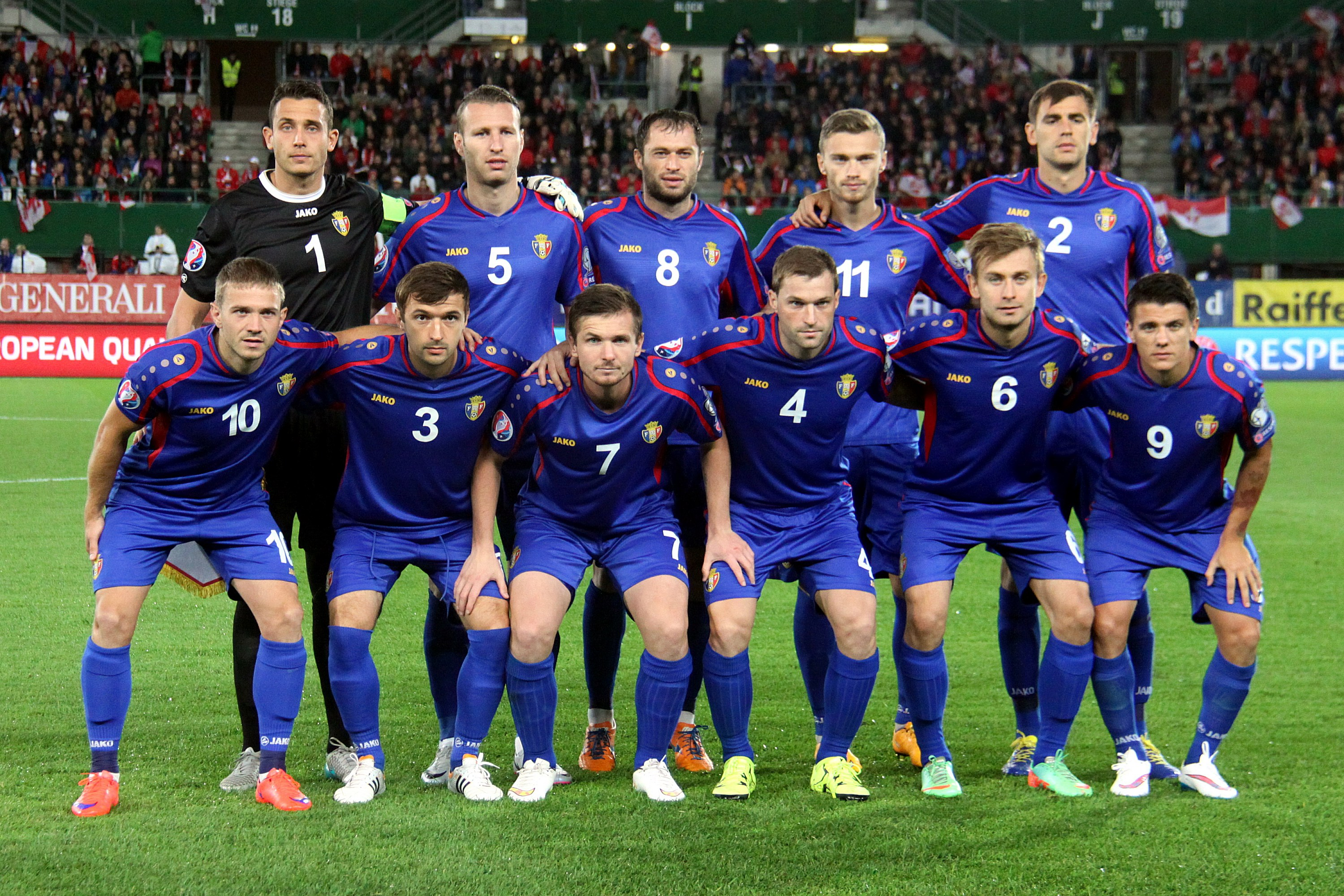
The Moldova line-up before the Euro 2016 qualifying match against Austria, September 2015

Moldova beat Finland 2–0 in Euro 2012 qualifying, placing only above San Marino. The Moldovans finished only above San Marino again in 2014 FIFA World Cup qualifying, but they beat Montenegro 5–2 and drew with Ukraine and Poland. During UEFA Euro 2016 qualifying Moldova achieved a 1–1 draw against Russia at Moscow. The equalising goal was Alexandru Epureanu's last international goal, who went on to become the first Moldovan with 100 appearances for the national team. In the same competition, Moldova suffered a humiliating 0–1 defeat against the Liechtenstein on home ground, placing last in the group. In 2018 FIFA World Cup qualification the Moldovans placed last in the group again, only obtaining two draws with Georgia.

In the inaugural season of the UEFA Nations League, the Moldovans played in League D, the competition's lowest division. They placed third in their group, above San Marino. Moldova's victory over them was its first competitive win since 2014. In UEFA Euro 2020 qualifying Moldova suffered another disappointing result, a 0–1 loss to Andorra, finishing last in the group.

=== 2020s ===
Moldova was the best third-placed team of 2018–19 UEFA Nations League D and obtained promotion to 2020–21 UEFA Nations League C due to a revamp of the competition's format. Moldova obtained only one point, a draw with the Kosovo, placing last in its group. Thus, Moldova had to play the relegation play-outs. Between the matches for the 2020–21 UEFA Nations League, Moldova suffered a 6–0 defeat to Italy in a friendly match, which equalled Moldova's worst defeat at the time.

In 2022 FIFA World Cup qualification Moldova obtained only one point, a draw with the Faroe Islands. Moldova also suffered what was at the time its worst defeat ever during these qualifiers, an 8–0 loss against Denmark. During these qualifiers Moldova placed 181st in October 2021 FIFA Ranking, the lowest position it ever reached. After losing to Kazakhstan on penalties in 2020–21 UEFA Nations League relegation play-outs, the Moldovans were relegated to 2022–23 UEFA Nations League D. Moldova was tied on points with Latvia, but because of a lower goal difference placed second, failing to achieve promotion.

The UEFA Euro 2024 qualifying was a watershed moment for Moldova. The Moldovans came agonisingly close to a historic Euro debut, acquiring ten points in a group of five; the Moldovans also gained an impressive feat by being undefeated at home throughout the qualification, including a historic shock 3–2 comeback win over Poland and were one win away from qualifying for UEFA Euro 2024. However, a denting away loss to the Czech Republic in the final matchday killed off Moldova's qualification hopes, as they finished fourth and were eliminated due to an inferior record. Ion Nicolaescu scored his 11th and 12th international goals in the 3–2 win against Poland, becoming Moldova's top goal scorer. With 4 goals in the competition, he became the first Moldovan to be the top goal scorer of a qualifying group.

On 9 September 2025, Moldova suffered their biggest defeat ever in a 11–1 loss against Norway at the Ullevaal Stadium in Oslo, Norway, where Erling Haaland scored 5 goals in this match. Two days after the match, Serghei Cleșcenco resigned as Moldova's head coach.

== Current sponsorship ==
Official sponsors: maib, Mastercard, Orange, Kaufland, Jako, Cricova, OM, Invitro Diagnostics, Estate Invest Company.

=== Kit suppliers ===
Kit supplier	Period
(Germany) Reusch	1994–1997
(Germany) Puma	1998–2000
(Germany) Jako	2001–present

== Home stadium ==
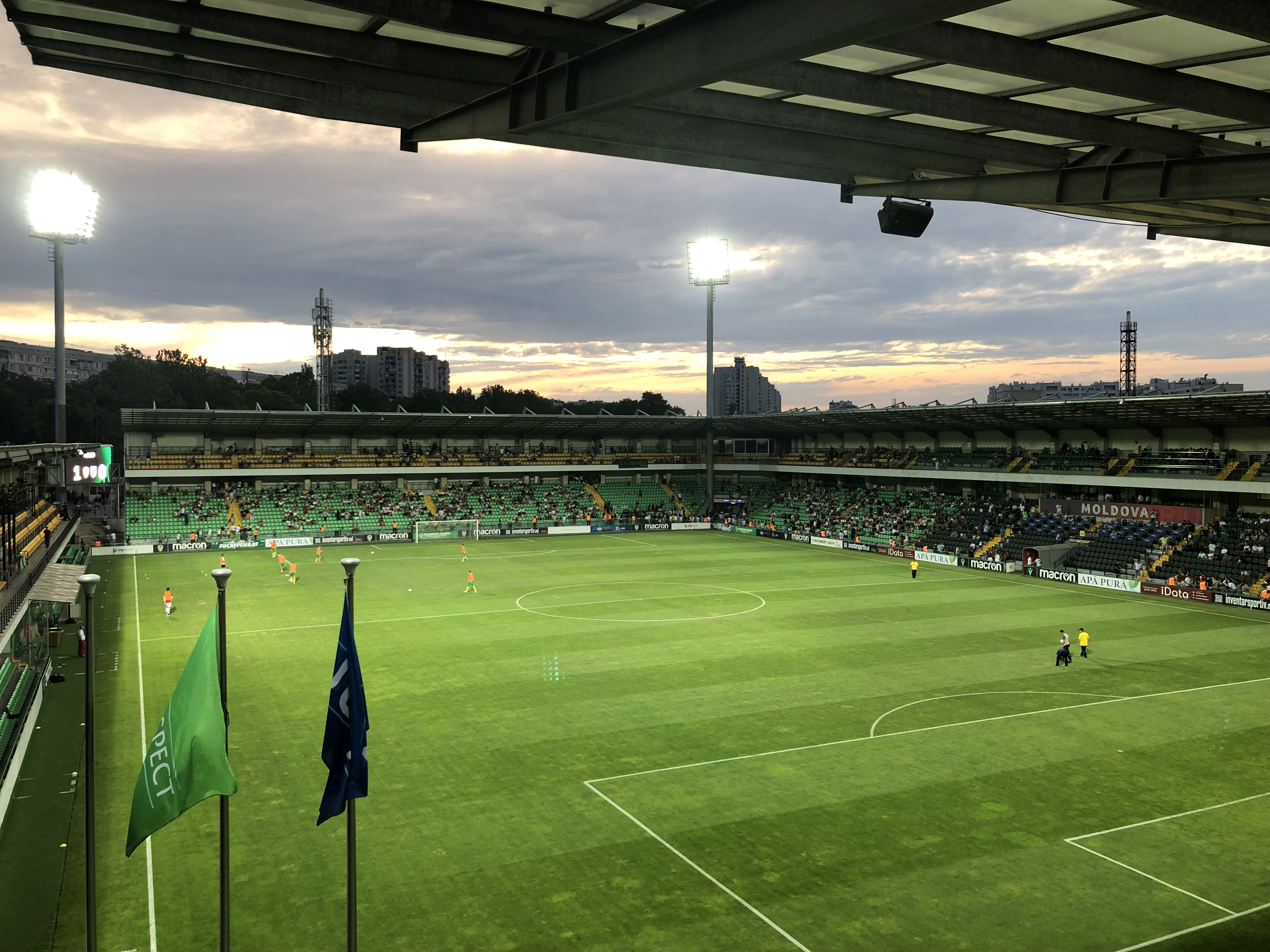
Zimbru Stadium

The Moldova national football team plays its official games at Zimbru Stadium in Chișinău. The stadium is a privately held structure, but is under administration of FMF until 2026. The senior team, along with youth teams use Stadionul CPSM for training purposes. It is located in Vadul lui Vodă, a town along the Dniester River, approximately 25 kilometres from Chișinău.

From 1991 to 2006, Moldova played its matches at the Republican Stadium in Chișinău. The team also played its home matches in UEFA Euro 2004 qualifying and some friendlies, the latest in 2013, at Sheriff Arena in Tiraspol.

== Results and fixtures ==
The following is a list of match results in the last 12 months, as well as any future matches that have been scheduled.

Win Draw Loss Fixture

=== 2026 ===
26 March 2026 Friendly	Moldova	0–2	Lithuania	Chișinău, Moldova
17:00 UTC+2		Report	Lasickas 33'; Gineitis 71'	Stadium: Stadionul Zimbru; Attendance: 4,328; Referee: Henrik Nalbandyan (Armenia)

30 March 2026 Friendly	Cyprus	3–2	Moldova	Nicosia, Cyprus
19:00 UTC+3	Kastanos 5'; Charalampous 30', 44'	Report	Popescu 55'; Stînă 88'	Stadium: GSP Stadium; Referee: Marian Barbu (Romania)

5 June 2026 Friendly	Moldova	2–2	Bulgaria	Chișinău, Moldova
20:00 UTC+3	Bogaciuc 60'; Baboglo 85'	Report	Rusev 23'; Petkov 76'	Stadium: Stadionul Zimbru; Attendance: 3,613; Referee: Tural Kurbanov (Azerbaijan)

9 June 2026 Friendly	Armenia	1–1	Moldova	Yerevan, Armenia
19:00 UTC+4	Serobyan 89'	Report	Bogaciuc 90+1'	Stadium: Vazgen Sargsyan Republican Stadium; Attendance: 6,000; Referee: Aleko Aptsiauri (Georgia)

26 September 2026 2026–27 UEFA Nations League C	Slovakia	2–0	Moldova	Prešov, Slovakia
20:45 UTC+2	Schranz 32'; Duda 40' (pen.)	Report		Stadium: Tatran Stadium; Attendance: 6,003; Referee: Juxhin Xhaja (Albania)

29 September 2026 2026–27 UEFA Nations League C	Moldova	1–1	Faroe Islands	Chișinău, Moldova
21:45 UTC+3	Perciun 66'	Report	Davidsen 27' (pen.)	Stadium: Stadionul Zimbru; Attendance: 4,542; Referee: Julian Weinberger (Austria)

2 October 2026 2026–27 UEFA Nations League C	Kazakhstan	1–2	Moldova	Astana, Kazakhstan
19:00 UTC+5	Alip 64'	Report	Cleșcenco 45+1'; Popescu 50'	Stadium: Astana Arena; Attendance: 20,119; Referee: Marian Barbu (Romania)

6 October 2026 2026–27 UEFA Nations League C	Moldova	0–4	Slovakia	Chișinău, Moldova
21:45 UTC+3		Report	Strelec 8'; Suslov 44'; Hancko 60'; Haraslín 75'	Stadium: Stadionul Zimbru; Attendance: 5,942; Referee: Yigal Frid (Israel)

13 November 2026 2026–27 UEFA Nations League C	Moldova	2–1	Kazakhstan	Chișinău, Moldova
19:00 UTC+2	Popescu 39', 77'	Report	Chesnokov 51'	Stadium: Stadionul Zimbru; Attendance: 6,783; Referee: Andrea Colombo (Italy)

16 November 2026 2026–27 UEFA Nations League C	Faroe Islands	1–0	Moldova	Tórshavn, Faroe Islands
15:00 UTC+0	Samuelsen 24'	Report		Stadium: Tórsvøllur; Attendance: 4,167; Referee: Enea Jorgji (Albania)

=== 2026–27 UEFA Nations League ===
==== Group C3 ====
Pos	Team	Pld	W	D	L	GF	GA	GD	Pts	Promotion or qualification
1	Slovakia (P)	6	3	3	0	13	6	+7	12	Promotion to League B
2	Faroe Islands	6	1	5	0	8	7	+1	8	Qualification for promotion play-offs
3	Moldova	6	2	1	3	5	10	−5	7	
4	Kazakhstan	6	0	3	3	8	11	−3	3	

Source: UEFA
(P) Promoted

== Coaching staff ==
=== Current coaching staff ===
Position	Staff
Head coach	(Moldova) Lilian Popescu
Assistant coach	(Georgia (country)) Shota Makharadze
Coach analyst	(Moldova) Cristian Efros
Goalkeeping coach	(Moldova) Vladislav Baklanov
Fitness coach	(Moldova) Denis Zmeu

Last updated: 7 October 2025

=== Manager history ===
Former Moldova international Lilian Popescu is the current head coach of Moldova since September 2025.

As of 13 November 2026

Coach	Nat	Period	Pld	W	D	L	Win %
Ion Caras	(Moldova)	1991–1992	2	0	1	1	0.00
Eugen Piunovschi	(Moldova)	1992	5	3	0	2	60.00
Ion Caras	(Moldova)	1992–1997	27	5	3	19	18.52
Alexandru Mațiura (interim)	(Moldova)	1998	1	0	0	1	0.00
Ivan Daniliants	(Moldova)	1998–1999	14	2	7	5	14.29
Alexandru Mațiura	(Moldova)	1999–2001	16	4	4	8	25.00
Alexandru Spiridon	(Moldova)	2001	4	1	0	3	25.00
Viktor Pasulko	(Ukraine)	2002–2005	35	7	8	20	20.00
Anatol Teslev	(Moldova)	2006	6	1	2	3	16.67
Igor Dobrovolski	(Russia)	2007–2009	30	7	9	14	23.33
Gavril Balint	(Romania)	2010–2011	18	5	2	11	27.78
Ion Caras	(Moldova)	2012–2014	27	6	7	14	22.22
Alexandru Curtianu	(Moldova)	2014–2015	10	0	4	6	0.00
Ștefan Stoica (interim)	(Romania)	2015	3	0	0	3	0.00
Igor Dobrovolski	(Russia)	2016–2017	18	2	5	11	11.11
Alexandru Spiridon	(Moldova)	2018–2019	16	3	5	8	18.75
Semen Altman	(Ukraine)	2019	4	0	0	4	0.00
Engin Fırat	(Turkey)	2019–2020	11	0	2	9	0.00
Roberto Bordin	(Italy)	2021	12	1	1	10	8.33
Serghei Cleșcenco	(Moldova)	2021–2025	38	12	8	18	31.58
Lilian Popescu	(Moldova)	2025–	13	2	4	7	15.38

== Players ==
=== Current squad ===
The following players were selected for the UEFA Nations League matches against Kazakhstan and Faroe Islands on 13 and 16 November 2026, respectively.

Caps and goals are correct as of 19 November 2026, after the match against Faroe Islands.

No.	Pos.	Player	Date of birth (age)	Caps	Goals	Club
1	GK	Emil Tîmbur	21 July 1997 (age 29)	4	0	(Moldovan Football Federation) Sheriff Tiraspol
12	GK	Dumitru Celeadnic	23 April 1992 (age 34)	18	0	(Kazakhstan Football Federation) Kyzylzhar
23	GK	Andrei Cojuhar	20 July 1999 (age 27)	7	0	(Kyrgyz Football Union) Asia Talas
2	DF	Oleg Reabciuk	16 January 1998 (age 28)	68	0	(Royal Belgian Football Association) Anderlecht
3	DF	Mihail Ștefan	7 August 2001 (age 25)	11	0	(Uzbekistan Football Association) Dinamo Samarqand
4	DF	Vladislav Baboglo (captain)	14 November 1998 (age 28)	34	3	(Ukrainian Association of Football) Karpaty Lviv
5	DF	Stephan Negru	24 July 2002 (age 24)	2	0	(The Football Association) Swindon Town
6	DF	Mihail Gherasimencov	25 March 2005 (age 21)	13	0	(Canadian Soccer Association) Vancouver Whitecaps FC
14	DF	Denis Marandici	18 September 1996 (age 30)	15	0	(Association of Football Federations of Azerbaijan) Turan Tovuz
18	DF	Iurie Iovu	6 July 2002 (age 24)	9	0	(Scottish Football Association) Dundee United
19	DF	Daniel Dumbrăvanu	22 July 2001 (age 25)	14	0	(Romanian Football Federation) Voluntari
21	DF	Ioan-Călin Revenco	26 June 2000 (age 26)	34	1	(Moldovan Football Federation) Petrocub Hîncești
7	MF	Nichita Moțpan	17 July 2001 (age 25)	37	3	(Russian Football Union) SKA-Khabarovsk
8	MF	Victor Bogaciuc	17 October 1999 (age 27)	21	4	(Moldovan Football Federation) Petrocub Hîncești
9	MF	Sergiu Perciun	23 April 2006 (age 20)	16	1	(Italian Football Federation) Ascoli
10	MF	Vladimir Fratea	27 July 2003 (age 23)	9	0	(Moldovan Football Federation) Sheriff Tiraspol
11	MF	Victor Stînă	20 March 1998 (age 28)	35	4	(Association of Football Federations of Azerbaijan) Kapaz
16	MF	Danila Forov	7 January 2004 (age 22)	10	0	(Moldovan Football Federation) Sheriff Tiraspol
17	MF	Ovidiu David	24 October 2006 (age 20)	3	0	(Moldovan Football Federation) Petrocub Hîncești
22	MF	Vadim Rață	5 May 1993 (age 33)	69	3	(Romanian Football Federation) Argeș Pitești
13	FW	Alexandru Bețivu	21 June 2007 (age 19)	2	0	(Moldovan Football Federation) Zimbru Chișinău
15	FW	Petru Popescu	1 March 2002 (age 24)	10	4	(Moldovan Football Federation) Petrocub Hîncești
20	FW	Nicky Cleșcenco	23 July 2001 (age 25)	14	1	(Scottish Football Association) Kilmarnock

=== Recent call-ups ===
The following players have also been called up to the Moldova squad within the last 12 months.

Pos.	Player	Date of birth (age)	Caps	Goals	Club	Latest call-up
GK	Cristian Avram	27 July 1994 (age 32)	16	0	(Albania) Vllaznia	v.Cyprus, 30 March 2026
MF	Serafim Cojocari	7 January 2001 (age 25)	12	0	(Moldova) Petrocub Hîncești	v.Kazakhstan, 13 November 2026 ^{PRE}
DF	Cătălin Cucoș	29 September 2003 (age 23)	4	0	(Moldova) Petrocub Hîncești	v.Kazakhstan, 13 November 2026 ^{PRE}
DF	Ion Borș	25 July 2002 (age 24)	5	0	(Moldova) Petrocub Hîncești	v.Armenia, 9 June 2026 ^{INJ}
DF	Leo Saca	6 January 2007 (age 19)	1	0	(Romania) CFR Cluj	v.Armenia, 9 June 2026
DF	Sergiu Plătică	9 June 1991 (age 35)	59	0	(Moldova) Milsami Orhei	v.Cyprus, 30 March 2026
DF	Daniel Tonica	31 July 2007 (age 19)	1	0	(Italy) Torino U20	v.Cyprus, 30 March 2026
DF	Artur Crăciun	29 June 1998 (age 28)	38	0	(Poland) ŁKS Łódź	v.Lithuania, 26 March 2026 ^{WD}
MF	Ștefan Bodișteanu	1 February 2003 (age 23)	15	1	(Romania) Botoșani	v.Kazakhstan, 13 November 2026 ^{INJ}
MF	Cristian Dros	15 April 1998 (age 28)	20	0	(Albania) Vllaznia	v.Slovakia, 6 October 2026
MF	Serghei Țurcan	27 July 2004 (age 22)	3	0	(Moldova) Dacia Buiucani	v.Faroe Islands, 29 September 2026 ^{PRE}
MF	Dan Pușcaș	1 June 2001 (age 25)	6	0	(Moldova) Petrocub Hîncești	v.Armenia, 9 June 2026
MF	Teodor Lungu	12 June 1995 (age 31)	5	0	(Romania) Oțelul Galați	v.Armenia, 9 June 2026
MF	Ștefan Bîtca	27 September 2005 (age 21)	4	0	(Moldova) Sheriff Tiraspol	v.Armenia, 9 June 2026
MF	Ion Cărăruș	25 June 1996 (age 30)	1	0	(Romania) Corvinul Hunedoara	v.Cyprus, 30 March 2026
FW	Dmitri Mandrîcenco	13 May 1997 (age 29)	9	1	(Georgia (country)) Dinamo Batumi	v.Slovakia, 6 October 2026
FW	Virgiliu Postolachi	17 March 2000 (age 26)	37	1	(Australia) Brisbane Roar	v.Slovakia, 26 September 2026 ^{INJ}
FW	Nicolae Rotaru	19 December 2005 (age 20)	1	0	(Hungary) ETO Győr	v.Slovakia, 26 September 2026 ^{INJ}
FW	Victor Ciumașu	24 June 2005 (age 21)	2	0	(Moldova) Dacia Buiucani	v.Armenia, 9 June 2026
FW	Vitalie Damașcan	24 January 1999 (age 27)	46	5	(Israel) Hapoel Jerusalem	v.Bulgaria, 5 June 2026 ^{INJ}
FW	Alexandru Boiciuc	21 August 1997 (age 29)	14	0	(Romania) Bihor Oradea	v.Cyprus, 30 March 2026
^{INJ} Withdrew due to injury^{PRE} Preliminary squad / standby^{RET} Retired from the national team^{SUS} Serving suspension^{WD} Player withdrew from the squad due to non-injury issue.

== Individual records ==
As of 13 November 2026
Players in bold are still active with Moldova.

=== Most appearances ===
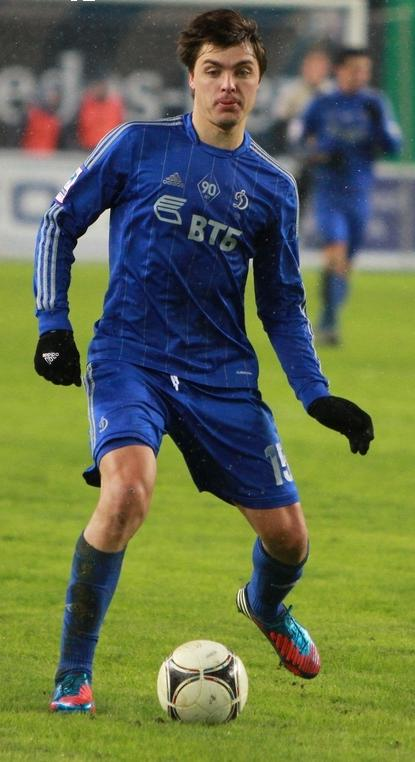
Alexandru Epureanu is Moldova's most capped player with 100 appearances.

Rank	Player	Caps	Goals	Career
1	Alexandru Epureanu	100	7	2006–2022
2	Igor Armaș	83	6	2008–2023
3	Artur Ioniță	81	5	2009–2025
4	Victor Golovatenco	79	3	2004–2017
5	Veaceslav Posmac	74	2	2013–2025
5	Radu Rebeja	74	2	1991–2008
7	Serghei Cleșcenco	69	11	1991–2006
7	**Vadim Rață**	69	3	2015–present
9	Eugeniu Cebotaru	68	1	2007–2020
9	**Oleg Reabciuk**	68	0	2018–present

=== Top goalscorers ===
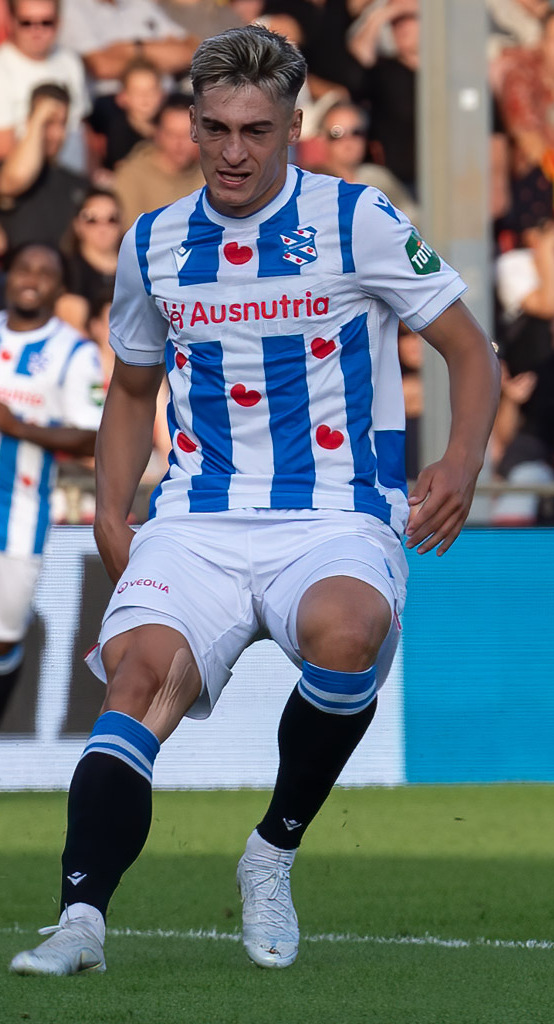
Ion Nicolaescu is Moldova's all-time top scorer with 18 goals.

Rank	Player	Goals	Caps	Ratio	Career
1	**Ion Nicolaescu**	18	56	0.32	2018–present
2	Serghei Cleșcenco	11	69	0.16	1991–2006
3	Serghei Rogaciov	9	52	0.17	1996–2007
4	Sergiu Dadu	8	30	0.27	2002–2013
4	Iurie Miterev	8	36	0.22	1992–2006
4	Igor Bugaiov	8	54	0.15	2007–2017
7	Eugen Sidorenco	7	35	0.2	2010–2019
7	Viorel Frunză	7	37	0.19	2002–2015
7	Radu Gînsari	7	47	0.15	2012–2022
7	Alexandru Epureanu	7	100	0.07	2006–2022

== Competitive record ==
=== FIFA World Cup ===
FIFA World Cup record										Qualification record						
Year	Result	Position	Pld	W	D	L	GF	GA	Squad	Pld	W	D	L	GF	GA	Campaign
1930 to 1938	Part of Romania									Part of Romania						—
1950 to 1990	Part of Soviet Union									Part of Soviet Union						—
1994	Not a FIFA member									Not a FIFA member (Note: FIFA member since 16 June 1994.)						—
(France) 1998	Did not qualify									8	0	0	8	2	21	1998
(South Korea) (Japan) 2002	Did not qualify									10	1	3	6	6	20	2002
(Germany) 2006	Did not qualify									10	1	2	7	5	16	2006
(South Africa) 2010	Did not qualify									10	0	3	7	6	18	2010
(Brazil) 2014	Did not qualify									10	3	2	5	12	17	2014
(Russia) 2018	Did not qualify									10	0	2	8	4	23	2018
(Qatar) 2022	Did not qualify									10	0	1	9	5	30	2022
(Canada) (Mexico) (United States) 2026	Did not qualify									8	0	1	7	5	32	2026
(Morocco) (Portugal) (Spain) 2030 (Note: Additional matches are scheduled to be played in Argentina, Paraguay, and Uruguay in commemoration of the 100th anniversary of the first world cup, however they are not considered to be official hosts of the tournament.)	To be determined									To be determined						
(Saudi Arabia) 2034	To be determined									To be determined						
Total										76	5	14	57	45	177	0/8

=== UEFA European Championship ===
UEFA European Championship record										Qualifying record						
Year	Result	Position	Pld	W	D	L	GF	GA	Squad	Pld	W	D	L	GF	GA	Campaign
1960 to 1988	Part of Soviet Union									Part of Soviet Union						—
1992	Part of CIS									Part of Soviet Union						—
(England) 1996	Did not qualify									10	3	0	7	11	27	1996
(Belgium) (Netherlands) 2000	Did not qualify									8	0	4	4	7	17	2000
(Portugal) 2004	Did not qualify									8	2	0	6	5	19	2004
(Austria) (Switzerland) 2008	Did not qualify									12	3	3	6	12	19	2008
(Poland) (Ukraine) 2012	Did not qualify									10	3	0	7	12	16	2012
(France) 2016	Did not qualify									10	0	2	8	4	16	2016
(Europe) 2020 (Note: The tournament was held in 11 cities in 11 UEFA countries (Azerbaijan, Denmark, England, Germany, Hungary, Italy, Netherlands, Romania, Russia, Scotland, and Spain). It was originally scheduled to take place from 12 June to 12 July 2020 but was postponed to 11 June and 11 July 2021.)	Did not qualify									10	1	0	9	4	26	2020
(Germany) 2024	Did not qualify									8	2	4	2	7	10	2024
(England) (Republic of Ireland) (Scotland) (Wales) 2028	To be determined									To be determined						
(Italy) (Turkey) 2032	To be determined									To be determined						
Total										76	14	13	49	62	150	0/8

=== UEFA Nations League ===
UEFA Nations League record										Promotion/relegation play-offs						
Season	League	Position	Pld	W	D	L	GF	GA	RK	Pld	W	D	L	GF	GA	P/R
2018–19	D	3rd	6	2	3	1	4	5	48th	—N/a						▲
2020–21	C	4th	6	0	1	5	1	11	48th	2	1	0	1	2	2	▼
2022–23	D	2nd	6	4	1	1	10	6	51st	—N/a						Same position
2024–25	D	1st	4	3	0	1	5	1	49th	—N/a						▲
2026–27	C	3rd	6	2	1	3	5	10	42nd	—N/a						Same position
2028–29	C	To be determined								—N/a						
Total			28	11	6	11	25	33	—	2	1	0	1	2	2	—

=== By competition ===
Competition	Pld	W	D	L	GF	GA	GD	Win %	Loss %
FIFA World Cup qualification	76	5	14	57	45	177	–132	6.58	75
UEFA European qualification	76	14	13	49	62	150	–88	18.42	64.47
UEFA Nations League	30	12	6	12	27	35	–8	40	40
Total	182	31	33	118	134	362	–228	17.03	64.84

== Head-to-head record ==
As of 13 November 2026, after the match against Kazakhstan.

Key
Positive balance (more Wins)
Neutral balance (Wins = Losses)
Negative balance (more Losses)

Opponent	Pld	W	D	L	GF	GA	GD	Win %
Albania	7	0	2	5	3	15	−12	0.00
Andorra	10	7	2	1	13	4	+9	70.00
Armenia	6	1	4	1	8	6	+2	16.67
Austria	9	1	1	7	4	15	−11	11.11
Azerbaijan	12	4	5	3	10	8	+2	33.33
Belarus	9	2	4	3	7	10	−3	22.22
Bosnia and Herzegovina	2	1	1	0	3	2	+1	50.00
Bulgaria	3	0	1	2	3	9	−6	0.00
Cameroon	1	0	0	1	0	1	−1	0.00
Canada	1	0	1	0	1	1	+0	0.00
Cayman Islands	1	1	0	0	4	0	+4	100.00
Congo	1	1	0	0	3	1	+2	100.00
Croatia	2	0	0	2	0	2	−2	0.00
Cyprus	3	1	0	2	7	8	−1	33.33
Czech Republic	4	0	1	3	0	10	−10	0.00
Denmark	2	0	0	2	0	12	−12	0.00
El Salvador	1	0	0	1	0	2	−2	0.00
England	4	0	0	4	0	16	−16	0.00
Estonia	7	1	2	4	4	7	−3	14.29
Faroe Islands	5	1	3	1	5	5	+0	20.00
Finland	4	1	1	2	5	7	−2	25.00
France	2	0	0	2	2	6	−4	0.00
Georgia	12	4	4	4	14	17	−3	33.33
Germany	4	0	0	4	3	18	−15	0.00
Gibraltar	1	0	1	0	1	1	+0	0.00
Greece	7	0	1	6	2	13	−11	0.00
Hungary	7	1	2	4	6	10	−4	14.29
Iceland	2	0	0	2	1	5	−4	0.00
Indonesia	1	1	0	0	2	1	+1	100.00
Iraq	1	0	0	1	0	1	−1	0.00
Israel	10	0	3	7	7	22	−15	0.00
Italy	7	0	0	7	2	19	−17	0.00
Ivory Coast	1	0	0	1	1	2	−1	0.00
Jordan	2	1	0	1	2	1	+1	50.00
Kazakhstan	9	5	1	3	10	9	+1	55.56
Kosovo	2	0	1	1	1	2	−1	0.00
Kyrgyzstan	1	1	0	0	2	1	+1	100.00
Latvia	5	2	0	3	9	11	−2	40.00
Liechtenstein	4	2	1	1	5	2	+3	50.00
Lithuania	9	2	4	3	9	13	−4	22.22
Luxembourg	6	1	4	1	3	6	−3	16.67
Malta	9	4	3	2	9	7	+2	44.44
Montenegro	4	1	0	3	5	7	−2	25.00
Netherlands	4	0	0	4	1	9	−8	0.00
North Macedonia	4	0	4	0	4	4	+0	0.00
Northern Ireland	2	0	2	0	2	2	+0	0.00
Norway	7	0	1	6	2	22	−20	0.00
Pakistan	1	1	0	0	5	0	+5	100.00
Poland	9	1	2	6	6	15	−9	11.11
Portugal	1	0	0	1	0	3	−3	0.00
Qatar	1	0	1	0	1	1	+0	0.00
Republic of Ireland	2	0	0	2	1	5	−4	0.00
Romania (Note: Moldova have played four more matches (0–1–3) against Romania, but they are not considered official.)	5	0	0	5	3	17	−14	0.00
Russia	4	0	2	2	2	4	−2	0.00
San Marino	9	9	0	0	18	0	+18	100.00
Saudi Arabia	2	1	0	1	4	3	+1	50.00
Scotland	4	0	1	3	1	6	−5	0.00
Serbia	2	0	0	2	0	6	−6	0.00
Slovakia	5	1	0	4	4	11	−7	20.00
Slovenia	4	0	0	4	1	10	−9	0.00
South Korea	2	0	0	2	0	5	−5	0.00
Sudan	1	1	0	0	2	1	+1	100.00
Sweden	9	0	0	9	4	24	−20	0.00
Switzerland	3	0	0	3	1	6	−5	0.00
Turkey	12	0	2	10	3	31	−28	0.00
Uganda	1	0	0	1	2	3	−1	0.00
Ukraine	6	0	2	4	3	10	−7	0.00
United Arab Emirates	1	0	0	1	2	3	−1	0.00
United States	2	0	1	1	1	4	−3	0.00
Venezuela	1	0	0	1	0	4	−4	0.00
Wales	4	1	0	3	3	9	−6	25.00
Total	308	62	71	175	252	533	−281	20.13

== See also ==
- Football in Moldova
- Moldova national under-21 football team
- Moldova national under-19 football team
- Moldova national under-17 football team
- Moldova national futsal team
- Moldova national beach soccer team
