= Moldova national football team results (1991–1999) =

- Win Draw Loss

This page shows a list of results of Moldova national football team from the team's first match until the end of 1999.

== Matches ==
=== 1991 ===
2 July Friendly	Moldova	2–4	Georgia	Chişinău, Moldova
	Spiridon 27'; Harea 50'	Report	Ketsbaia 5'; Daraselia 13'; Jishkariani 79'; Kavelashvili 88'	Stadium: Stadionul Republican; Attendance: 7,000; Referee: Aleksandr Gorin (Soviet Union)

=== 1992 ===
20 May Friendly	Moldova	1–1	Lithuania	Chişinău, Moldova
	Alexandrov 5'	Report	Ramelis 78'	Stadium: Stadionul Republican; Attendance: 8,000; Referee: Oleksandr Dehtyaryov (Ukraine)

18 August 1992 Jordan International Tournament	Pakistan	0–5	Moldova	Amman, Jordan
		Report	Scala 25'; Alexandrov 50', 55', 70', 75'	Stadium: Amman International Stadium; Attendance: 15,000; Referee: Dirar Al Tamini (Jordan)

20 August 1992 Jordan International Tournament	Sudan	1–2	Moldova	Amman, Jordan
	Nejmi 60' (pen.)	Report	Spiridon 15'; Oprea 70'	Stadium: Amman International Stadium; Attendance: 10,100; Referee: N.K.

22 August 1992 Jordan International Tournament	Jordan	1–0	Moldova	Amman, Jordan
	Tadrus 85'	Report		Stadium: Amman International Stadium; Attendance: 30,000; Referee: N.K.

26 August 1992 Jordan International Tournament semi-finals	Iraq	1–0	Moldova	Irbid, Jordan
	Jafar 20'	Report		Stadium: Al Hassan Stadium; Attendance: 35,000; Referee: Okaid (Jordan)

28 August 1992 Jordan International Tournament 3rd place match	Congo	1–3	Moldova	Amman, Jordan
	N.K. (?)	Report	Miterev 40', 59', 70'	Stadium: Amman International Stadium; Attendance: 18,000; Referee: N.K.

14 October Friendly	Armenia	0–0	Moldova	Yerevan, Armenia
		Report		Stadium: Hrazdan Stadium; Attendance: 4,500; Referee: Pogos Baliyan (Armenia)

=== 1994 ===
16 April Friendly	United States	1–1	Moldova	Jacksonville, United States
	Sorber 47'	Report	Kosse 85' (pen.)	Stadium: Sam W. Wolfson Baseball Park; Attendance: 6,103; Referee: Joshua Patlak (United States)

20 April Friendly	United States	3–0	Moldova	Davidson, United States
	Klopas 3'; Lapper 40'; Reyna 59'	Report		Stadium: Richardson Stadium, Davidson College; Attendance: 4,790; Referee: Zimmerman Boulos (United States)

2 September Friendly	Moldova	2–1	Azerbaijan	Chişinău, Moldova
	Cleşcenco 10', 41'	Report	Alakbarov 3'	Stadium: Stadionul Republican; Attendance: 300; Referee: Anatoli Ianeţ (Moldova)

7 September UEFA Euro 1996 qualifying	Georgia	0–1	Moldova	Tbilisi, Georgia
		Report; Report (UEFA)	Oprea 40'	Stadium: Boris Paichadze Stadium; Attendance: 62,000; Referee: Ahmet Çakar (Turkey)

12 October UEFA Euro 1996 qualifying	Moldova	3–2	Wales	Chişinău, Moldova
	Belous 8'; Secu 28'; Pogorelov 76'	Report; Report (UEFA)	Speed 5'; Blake 67'	Stadium: Stadionul Republican; Attendance: 18,000; Referee: István Vad Sr. (Hungary)

16 November UEFA Euro 1996 qualifying	Bulgaria	4–1	Moldova	Sofia, Bulgaria
	Stoichkov 43', 85'; Balakov 63'; Kostadinov 87'	Report; Report (UEFA)	Cleşcenco 61'	Stadium: Vasil Levski National Stadium; Attendance: 45,000; Referee: Denis McArdle (Ireland)

14 December UEFA Euro 1996 qualifying	Moldova	0–3	Germany	Chişinău, Moldova
		Report; Report (UEFA)	Kirsten 7'; Klinsmann 38'; Matthäus 72'	Stadium: Stadionul Republican; Attendance: 26,000; Referee: Jef van Vliet (Netherlands)

=== 1995 ===
29 March UEFA Euro 1996 qualifying	Albania	3–0	Moldova	Tirana, Albania
	Kushta 31', 80'; Kaçaj 41'	Report; Report (UEFA)		Stadium: Qemal Stafa Stadium; Attendance: 8,500; Referee: Urs Meier (Switzerland)

26 April UEFA Euro 1996 qualifying	Moldova	0–3	Bulgaria	Chişinău, Moldova
		Report; Report (UEFA)	Balakov 30'; Stoichkov 57', 67'	Stadium: Stadionul Republican; Attendance: 18,000; Referee: Jiří Ulrich (Czech Republic)

7 June UEFA Euro 1996 qualifying	Moldova	2–3	Albania	Chişinău, Moldova
	Curtianu 10'; Cleşcenco 15'	Report; Report (UEFA)	Kushta 8'; Bellaj 25'; Vata 71'	Stadium: Stadionul Republican; Attendance: 7,000; Referee: Léon Schellings (Belgium)

6 September UEFA Euro 1996 qualifying	Wales	1–0	Moldova	Cardiff, Wales
	Speed 55'	Report; Report (UEFA)		Stadium: Cardiff Arms Park; Attendance: 6,721; Referee: Gylfi Thór Orrason (Iceland)

8 October UEFA Euro 1996 qualifying	Germany	6–1	Moldova	Leverkusen, Germany
	Stroenco 16' (o.g.); Helmer 18'; Sammer 24', 72'; Möller 47', 61'	Report; Report (UEFA)	Rebeja 82'	Stadium: Ulrich Haberland Stadion; Attendance: 18,400; Referee: Zygmunt Ziober (Poland)

15 November UEFA Euro 1996 qualifying	Moldova	3–2	Georgia	Chişinău, Moldova
	Testimiţanu 5' (pen.); Miterev 17', 68'	Report; Report (UEFA)	Dzhanashia 66'; Culibaba 77' (o.g.)	Stadium: Stadionul Republican; Attendance: 9,000; Referee: Mario van der Ende (Netherlands)

=== 1996 ===
9 April Friendly	Moldova	2–2	Ukraine	Chişinău, Moldova
	Testemiţanu 72'; Popovici 84'	Report	Huseynov 49', 66'	Stadium: Stadionul Republican; Attendance: 4,500; Referee: Vadzim Zhuk (Belarus)

1 June Friendly	Romania	3–1	Moldova	Bucharest, Romania
	Petrescu 28'; Popescu 36', 40'	Report	Testemiţanu 78'	Stadium: Stadionul Steaua; Attendance: 4,000; Referee: Vasyl Melnychuk (Ukraine)

14 August Friendly	Turkey	2–0	Moldova	Istanbul, Turkey
	Sancakli 68', 90' (pen.)	Report		Stadium: BJK İnönü Stadium; Attendance: 7,345; Referee: Salem Prolić (Bosnia & Herzegovina)

1 September 1998 FIFA World Cup qualifying	Moldova	0–3	England	Chişinău Moldova
		Report; Report (FIFA)	Barmby 24'; Gascoigne 26'; Shearer 61'	Stadium: Stadionul Republican; Attendance: 13,500; Referee: Ilkka Koho (Finland)

5 October 1998 FIFA World Cup qualifying	Moldova	1–3	Italy	Chişinău, Moldova
	Curtianu 12'	Report; Report (FIFA)	Ravanelli 8', 87'; Casiraghi 67'	Stadium: Stadionul Republican; Attendance: 4,085; Referee: Gerd Grabher (Austria)

30 October Friendly	Indonesia	1–2	Moldova	Genoa, Italy
	Sakti 35'	Report	Miterev 62', 70'	Stadium: Stadio La Sciorba; Attendance: 70; Referee: Massimo Compofierito (Italy)

10 November 1998 FIFA World Cup qualifying	Poland	2–1	Moldova	Katowice, Poland
	Bałuszyński 4'; Warzycha 77' (pen.)	Report; Report (FIFA)	Cleşcenco 83' (pen.)	Stadium: Stadion GKS; Attendance: 8,000; Referee: Sotirios Vorgias (Greece)

=== 1997 ===
23 March Friendly	Ukraine	1–0	Moldova	Kyiv, Ukraine
	Rebrov 56'	Report		Stadium: Olimpiyskiy National Sports Complex; Attendance: 2,500; Referee: Robert Sedlacek (Austria)

29 March 1998 FIFA World Cup qualifying	Italy	3–0	Moldova	Trieste, Italy
	Maldini 24'; Zola 45'; Vieri 50'	Report; Report (FIFA)		Stadium: Stadio Nereo Rocco; Attendance: 26,000; Referee: Gilles Veissière (France)

7 June 1998 FIFA World Cup qualifying	Georgia	2–0	Moldova	Batumi, Georgia
	Arveladze 27'; Kinkladze 51'	Report; Report (FIFA)		Stadium: Tsentral Stadiu; Attendance: 12,500; Referee: Charles Agius (Malta)

10 September 1998 FIFA World Cup qualifying	England	4–0	Moldova	London, England
	Scholes 29'; Wright 46', 90'; Gascoigne 81'	Report; Report (FIFA)		Stadium: Wembley Stadium; Attendance: 74,102; Referee: Karl-Erik Nilsson (Sweden)

24 September 1998 FIFA World Cup qualifying	Moldova	0–1	Georgia	Chişinău, Moldova
		Report; Report (FIFA)	Ketsbaia 10'	Stadium: Stadionul Republican; Attendance: 8,000; Referee: Dani Koren (Israel)

7 October 1998 FIFA World Cup qualifying	Moldova	0–3	Poland	Chişinău, Moldova
		Report; Report (FIFA)	Juskowiak 23', 56', 60'	Stadium: Stadionul Republican; Attendance: 8,000; Referee: Metin Tokat (Turkey)

=== 1998 ===
22 March Friendly	Azerbaijan	1–0	Moldova	Baku, Azerbaijan
	Hüseynov 48'	Report		Stadium: Tofiq Bahramov Stadium; Attendance: 10,000; Referee: Asim Xudiyev (Azerbaijan)

6 June Friendly	Romania	5–1	Moldova	Ploiești, Romania
	Popescu 32'; Petrescu 34'; Dumitrescu 49'; Moldovan 72'; Niculescu 84'	Report	Tabanov 88'	Stadium: Stadionul Ilie Oană; Attendance: 7,000; Referee: Zoran Arsić (FR Yugoslavia)

16 August Friendly	Lithuania	1–1	Moldova	Kaunas, Lithuania
	Bezykornovas 24'	Report	Miknevičius 44' (o.g.)	Stadium: Darius and Girėnas Stadium; Attendance: 1,500; Referee: Sergejus Slyva (Lithuania)

20 August Friendly	Estonia	0–1	Moldova	Kohtla-Järve, Estonia
		Report	Cleşcenco 68'	Stadium: Spordikeskuse Staadion; Attendance: 1,800; Referee: Oleg Timofejev (Estonia)

5 September UEFA Euro 2000 qualifying	Finland	3–2	Moldova	Helsinki, Finland
	Kolkka 8'; Johansson 44'; Paatelainen 63'	Report; Report (UEFA)	Oprea 10', 12'	Stadium: Olympic Stadium; Attendance: 18,717; Referee: Graham Barber (England)

23 September Friendly	Moldova	0–0	Romania B	Chişinău, Moldova
		Report		Stadium: Stadionul Republican; Attendance: 6,000; Referee: Vladimir Antonov (Moldova)

14 October UEFA Euro 2000 qualifying	Moldova	1–3	Germany	Chişinău, Moldova
	Guzun 6'	Report; Report (UEFA)	Kirsten 19', 35'; Bierhoff 38'	Stadium: Stadionul Republican; Attendance: 5,000; Referee: Juan Fernández Marín (Spain)

18 November UEFA Euro 2000 qualifying	Northern Ireland	2–2	Moldova	Belfast, Northern Ireland
	Dowie 49'; Lennon 63'	Report; Report (UEFA)	Gaidamaşchuc 22'; Testemiţanu 56'	Stadium: Windsor Park; Attendance: 11,500; Referee: Vladimír Hriňák (Slovakia)

=== 1999 ===
10 March Friendly	Malta	0–2	Moldova	Attard, Malta
		Report	Epureanu 74'; Suharev 87'	Stadium: Ta' Qali National Stadium; Attendance: 350; Referee: Roland Beck (Liechtenstein)

27 March UEFA Euro 2000 qualifying	Turkey	2–0	Moldova	Istanbul, Turkey
	Şükür 34'; Sergen 90'	Report; Report (UEFA)		Stadium: Ali Sami Yen Stadium; Attendance: 20,000; Referee: Konrad Plautz (Austria)

31 March UEFA Euro 2000 qualifying	Moldova	0–0	Northern Ireland	Chişinău, Moldova
		Report; Report (UEFA)		Stadium: Stadionul Republican; Attendance: 13,000; Referee: Edo Trivković (Croatia)

4 June UEFA Euro 2000 qualifying	Germany	6–1	Moldova	Leverkusen, Germany
	Bierhoff 2', 56', 82'; Kirsten 27'; Bode 38'; Scholl 71'	Report; Report (UEFA)	Stratulat 76'	Stadium: BayArena; Attendance: 21,000; Referee: Jorge Monteiro Coroado (Portugal)

9 June UEFA Euro 2000 qualifying	Moldova	0–0	Finland	Chişinău, Moldova
		Report; Report (UEFA)		Stadium: Stadionul Republican; Attendance: 8,000; Referee: Florenzo Treossi (Italy)

18 August Friendly	Hungary	1–1	Moldova	Budapest, Romania
	Sebők 39'	Report	Cleşcenco 65'	Stadium: Üllői úti Stadion; Attendance: 5,000; Referee: Wolfgang Sowa (Austria)

8 September UEFA Euro 2000 qualifying	Moldova	1–1	Turkey	Chişinău, Moldova
	Iepureanu 3'	Report; Report (UEFA)	Tayfur 76'	Stadium: Stadionul Republican; Attendance: 10,000; Referee: Andreas Schluchter (Switzerland)

16 December Friendly	Greece	2–0	Moldova	Larissa, Greece
	Georgiadis 61'; Frantzeskos 63'	Report		Stadium: Alcazar Stadium; Attendance: 1,500; Referee: Orhan Erdemir (Turkey)

== Notes ==
1. The ELO ratings include an away match against Belarus on 12 May 1993 (won 1–0), which is not included in the above table.
2. RSSSF include an away match against Romania B on 1 June 1993 (lost 3–2), which is not included in the above table.
