= Bulgaria national football team results (1980–1999) =

This is a list of the Bulgaria national football team results from 1990 to 1999.

== Results ==
Key
Win
Draw
Defeat

=== 1990 ===
5 May Friendly	Brazil	2–1	Bulgaria	Campinas, Brazil
16:00 UTC−3	Müller 10'; Aldair 80'	Report	Kostadinov 15'	Stadium: Estádio Brinco de Ouro; Attendance: 47,132; Referee: Ulisses da Silva (Brazil)

12 September UEFA Euro 1992 qualifying	Switzerland	2–0	Bulgaria	Geneva, Switzerland
20:00 UTC+2	Hottiger 19'; Bickel 63'	Report		Stadium: Charmilles Stadium; Attendance: 9,088; Referee: Guy Goethals (Belgium)

26 September Friendly	Sweden	2–0	Bulgaria	Solna, Sweden
19:00 UTC+2	Corneliusson 64'; Andersson 73'	Report		Stadium: Råsunda Stadium; Attendance: 6,954; Referee: Jan Damgaard (Denmark)

17 October UEFA Euro 1992 qualifying	Romania	0–3	Bulgaria	Bucharest, Romania
15:00 UTC+3		Report	Sirakov 28'; N. Todorov 48', 76'	Stadium: Steaua Stadium; Attendance: 15,350; Referee: José Rosa dos Santos (Portugal)

14 November UEFA Euro 1992 qualifying	Bulgaria	1–1	Scotland	Sofia, Bulgaria
18:00 UTC+2	N. Todorov 74'	Report	McCoist 9'	Stadium: Vasil Levski National Stadium; Attendance: 31,462; Referee: Friedrich Kaupe (Austria)

=== 1991 ===
27 March UEFA Euro 1992 qualifying	Scotland	1–1	Bulgaria	Glasgow, Scotland
20:00 UTC+0	Collins 83'	Report	Kostadinov 89'	Stadium: Hampden Park; Attendance: 33,119; Referee: Erik Fredriksson (Sweden)

9 April Friendly	Denmark	1–1	Bulgaria	Odense, Denmark
19:30 UTC+2	Høgh 32'	Report	Aleksandrov 84'	Stadium: Odense Stadium; Attendance: 4,004; Referee: Frans Van Den Wijngaert (Belgium)

1 May UEFA Euro 1992 qualifying	Bulgaria	2–3	Switzerland	Sofia, Bulgaria
18:00 UTC+3	Kostadinov 12'; Sirakov 27'	Report	Knup 59', 85'; Türkyılmaz 90'	Stadium: Vasil Levski National Stadium; Attendance: 35,142; Referee: Karl-Josef Assenmacher (Germany)

22 May UEFA Euro 1992 qualifying	San Marino	0–3	Bulgaria	Serravalle, San Marino
18:30 UTC+2		Report	T. Ivanov 13'; Sirakov 20'; Penev 70'	Stadium: Stadio Olimpico; Attendance: 612; Referee: Victor Mintoff (Malta)

28 May Friendly	Brazil	3–0	Bulgaria	Uberlândia, Brazil
21:30 UTC−3	Neto 17', 69'; João Paulo 25'	Report		Stadium: Estádio Municipal João Havelange; Attendance: 9,577; Referee: José Wright (Brazil)

21 August Friendly	Bulgaria	0–0	Turkey	Stara Zagora, Bulgaria
19:00 UTC+3		Report		Stadium: Beroe Stadium; Attendance: 8,000; Referee: Karl-Josef Assenmacher (Germany)

25 September Friendly	Bulgaria	2–1	Italy	Sofia, Bulgaria
19:00 UTC+3	Kostadinov 8'; Stoichkov 50' (pen.)	Report	Giannini 55'	Stadium: Vasil Levski National Stadium; Attendance: 8,000; Referee: Branimir Babarogić (Yugoslavia)

16 October UEFA Euro 1992 qualifying	Bulgaria	4–0	San Marino	Sofia, Bulgaria
18:00 UTC+3	Penev 18'; Stoichkov 31' (pen.); Yankov 38'; N. Iliev 84'	Report		Stadium: Vasil Levski National Stadium; Attendance: 7,352; Referee: Jiří Ulrich (Czechoslovakia)

20 November UEFA Euro 1992 qualifying	Bulgaria	1–1	Romania	Sofia, Bulgaria
18:00 UTC+2	Sirakov 55'	Report	Popescu 31'	Stadium: Vasil Levski National Stadium; Attendance: 27,744; Referee: Peter Mikkelsen (Denmark)

=== 1992 ===
28 April Friendly	Switzerland	0–2	Bulgaria	Bern, Switzerland
20:15 UTC+2		Report	Sirakov 40'; Kostadinov 47'	Stadium: Wankdorf Stadium; Attendance: 2,000; Referee: Markus Merk (Germany)

14 May 1994 FIFA World Cup qualification	Finland	0–3	Bulgaria	Helsinki, Finland
19:00 UTC+3		Report	Balakov 62'; Kostadinov 73', 87'	Stadium: Olympic Stadium; Attendance: 8,608; Referee: Dušan Colić (Yugoslavia)

19 August Friendly	Bulgaria	1–1	Mexico	Sofia, Bulgaria
18:00 UTC+2	Stoichkov 37'	Report	Espinoza 11'	Stadium: Vasil Levski National Stadium; Attendance: 15,000; Referee: Erman Toroğlu (Turkey)

26 August Friendly	Turkey	3–2	Bulgaria	Trabzon, Turkey
15:30 UTC+3	Mandıralı 68'; Şükür 71', 72'	Report	Stoilov 11', 89'	Stadium: Hüseyin Avni Aker Stadium; Attendance: 20,000; Referee: Gerhard Kapl (Austria)

9 September 1994 FIFA World Cup qualification	Bulgaria	2–0	France	Sofia, Bulgaria
19:00 UTC+3	Stoichkov 21' (pen.); Balakov 29'	Report		Stadium: Vasil Levski National Stadium; Attendance: 41,000; Referee: Sándor Puhl (Hungary)

7 October 1994 FIFA World Cup qualification	Sweden	2–0	Bulgaria	Solna, Sweden
19:00 UTC+1	Dahlin 56'; Pettersson 76'	Report		Stadium: Råsunda Stadium; Attendance: 20,625; Referee: John Blankenstein (Netherlands)

11 November Friendly	Portugal	2–1	Bulgaria	Saint-Ouen-sur-Seine, France
20:00 UTC+1	Figo 32'; Oceano 56'	Report	Balakov 26'	Stadium: Stade de Paris-Bauer; Attendance: 12,000; Referee: Alain Sars (France)

2 December 1994 FIFA World Cup qualification	Israel	0–2	Bulgaria	Ramat Gan, Israel
19:00 UTC+2		Report	Sirakov 56'; Penev 83'	Stadium: National Stadium; Attendance: 15,000; Referee: Vassilios Nikakis (Greece)

=== 1993 ===
10 January Friendly	Tunisia	3–0	Bulgaria	Béja, Tunisia
	Rouissi 6'; Ben Yahia 42'; Ben Belgacem 74'	Report		Stadium: Stade Olympique Boujemaa Kmiti; Attendance: 15,000; Referee: Messaoud Koussa (Algeria)

18 February Friendly	United Arab Emirates	1–0	Bulgaria	Dubai, United Arab Emirates
16:00 UTC+4	Said 67'	Report		Stadium: Zayed Sports City Stadium; Attendance: 5,000

20 February Friendly	United Arab Emirates	1–3	Bulgaria	Dubai, United Arab Emirates
16:00 UTC+4	Goal	Report	Sirakov 4'; Vidolov 28'; Borimirov 45'	Stadium: Zayed Sports City Stadium; Attendance: 4,000

14 April 1994 FIFA World Cup qualification	Austria	3–1	Bulgaria	Vienna, Austria
18:35 UTC+2	Pfeifenberger 8'; Kühbauer 25'; Polster 89'	Report	T. Ivanov 54'	Stadium: Ernst-Happel-Stadion; Attendance: 19,500; Referee: Sergei Khusainov (Russia)

28 April 1994 FIFA World Cup qualification	Bulgaria	2–0	Finland	Sofia, Bulgaria
19:00 UTC+3	Stoichkov 15' (pen.); Yankov 43'	Report		Stadium: Vasil Levski National Stadium; Attendance: 35,000; Referee: Lim Kee Chong (Mauritius)

12 May 1994 FIFA World Cup qualification	Bulgaria	2–2	Israel	Sofia, Bulgaria
19:30 UTC+3	Stoichkov 35' (pen.); Sirakov 60'	Report	R. Harazi 52'; Rosenthal 53'	Stadium: Vasil Levski National Stadium; Attendance: 25,000; Referee: Ahmet Çakar (Turkey)

8 September 1994 FIFA World Cup qualification	Bulgaria	1–1	Sweden	Sofia, Bulgaria
19:00 UTC+3	Stoichkov 21' (pen.)	Report	Dahlin 26'	Stadium: Vasil Levski National Stadium; Attendance: 36,000; Referee: Ryszard Wójcik (Poland)

13 October 1994 FIFA World Cup qualification	Bulgaria	4–1	Austria	Sofia, Bulgaria
17:00 UTC+3	Penev 6', 67'; Stoichkov 33' (pen.); Letchkov 86'	Report	Herzog 51'	Stadium: Vasil Levski National Stadium; Attendance: 22,500; Referee: Marcello Nicchi (Italy)

17 November 1994 FIFA World Cup qualification	France	1–2	Bulgaria	Paris, France
17:45 UTC+1	Cantona 31'	Report	Kostadinov 37', 90'	Stadium: Parc des Princes; Attendance: 48,402; Referee: Leslie Mottram (Scotland)

=== 1994 ===
19 January Friendly	Mexico	1–1	Bulgaria	San Diego, United States
21:00 UTC−8	Hermosillo 53'	Report	Balakov 82' (pen.)	Stadium: Jack Murphy Field; Attendance: 56,222; Referee: Helder Dias (United States)

15 April Friendly	Oman	1–1	Bulgaria	Muscat, Oman
	Mubarak 69'	Report	Yankov 83' (pen.)	Stadium: Sultan Qaboos Sports Complex; Attendance: 2,000; Referee: Ibrahim Khamis Al-Baluchi (Oman)

28 April Friendly	Kuwait	2–2	Bulgaria	Kuwait City, Kuwait
	Edeilem 15'; Nassar 36'	Report	Yankov 26'; Drulim 32' (o.g.)	Stadium: Al Kuwait Sports Club Stadium; Attendance: 5,000; Referee: Essa Rashed Al Jassas (Kuwait)

3 June Friendly	Bulgaria	1–1	Ukraine	Sofia, Bulgaria
19:00 UTC+3	Sirakov 18'	Report	Sak 55'	Stadium: Vasil Levski National Stadium; Attendance: 15,000; Referee: Adrian Porumboiu (Romania)

21 June 1994 FIFA World Cup group stage	Nigeria	3–0	Bulgaria	Dallas, United States
18:30 UTC−5	Yekini 21'; Amokachi 43'; Amunike 55'	Report		Stadium: Cotton Bowl; Attendance: 44,132; Referee: Rodrigo Badilla (Costa Rica)

26 June 1994 FIFA World Cup group stage	Bulgaria	4–0	Greece	Chicago, United States
11:30 UTC−5	Stoichkov 5' (pen.), 55' (pen.); Letchkov 65'; Borimirov 90'	Report		Stadium: Soldier Field; Attendance: 63,160; Referee: Ali Bujsaim (United Arab Emirates)

30 June 1994 FIFA World Cup group stage	Argentina	0–2	Bulgaria	Dallas, United States
18:30 UTC−5		Report	Stoichkov 61'; Sirakov 90+3'	Stadium: Cotton Bowl; Attendance: 63,998; Referee: Neji Jouini (Tunisia)

5 July 1994 FIFA World Cup round of 16	Mexico	1–1 (a.e.t.) (1–3 p)	Bulgaria	East Rutherford, United States
17:30 UTC−4	García Aspe 18' (pen.)	Report	Stoichkov 6'	Stadium: Giants Stadium; Attendance: 71,030; Referee: Jamal Al Sharif (Syria)
	Penalties
	García Aspe (penalty missed); Bernal (penalty missed); Rodríguez (penalty missed); Suárez (penalty scored)		(penalty missed) Balakov; (penalty scored) Genchev; (penalty scored) Borimirov; (penalty scored) Letchkov

10 July 1994 FIFA World Cup quarter-final	Bulgaria	2–1	Germany	East Rutherford, United States
13:00 UTC−4	Stoichkov 75'; Letchkov 78'	Report	Matthäus 47' (pen.)	Stadium: Giants Stadium; Attendance: 72,000; Referee: José Torres Cadena (Colombia)

13 July 1994 FIFA World Cup semi-final	Bulgaria	1–2	Italy	East Rutherford, United States
16:00 UTC−4	Stoichkov 44' (pen.)	Report	R. Baggio 21', 25'	Stadium: Giants Stadium; Attendance: 74,110; Referee: Joël Quiniou (France)

16 July 1994 FIFA World Cup third place play-off	Sweden	4–0	Bulgaria	Pasadena, United States
12:30 UTC−7	Brolin 8'; Mild 30'; Larsson 37'; Andersson 39'	Report		Stadium: Rose Bowl; Attendance: 91,500; Referee: Ali Bujsaim (United Arab Emirates)

12 October UEFA Euro 1996 qualifying	Bulgaria	2–0	Georgia	Sofia, Bulgaria
19:00 UTC+2	Kostadinov 58', 63'	Report		Stadium: Vasil Levski National Stadium; Attendance: 48,000; Referee: Ladislav Gadoši (Slovakia)

16 November UEFA Euro 1996 qualifying	Bulgaria	4–1	Moldova	Sofia, Bulgaria
18:00 UTC+2	Stoichkov 43', 85'; Balakov 63'; Kostadinov 87'	Report	Cleșcenco 61'	Stadium: Vasil Levski National Stadium; Attendance: 36,048; Referee: Denis McArdle (Ireland)

14 December UEFA Euro 1996 qualifying	Wales	0–3	Bulgaria	Cardiff, Wales
19:30 UTC+0		Report	T. Ivanov 5'; Kostadinov 16'; Stoichkov 51'	Stadium: Cardiff Arms Park; Attendance: 23,206; Referee: Leif Sundell (Sweden)

=== 1995 ===
14 February Friendly	Argentina	4–1	Bulgaria	Mendoza, Argentina
	Gallardo 33' (pen.), 36' (pen.); Rambert 55', 65'	Report	Sirakov 51'	Stadium: Estadio Malvinas Argentinas; Attendance: 42,615; Referee: Eduardo Gamboa (Chile)

29 March UEFA Euro 1996 qualifying	Bulgaria	3–1	Wales	Sofia, Bulgaria
19:00 UTC+3	Balakov 37'; Penev 70', 82'	Report	Saunders 83'	Stadium: Vasil Levski National Stadium; Attendance: 60,000; Referee: Michel Piraux (Belgium)

12 April Friendly	Macedonia	0–0	Bulgaria	Kočani, Macedonia
		Report		Stadium: Nikola Mantov Stadium; Attendance: 7,000; Referee: Krste Danilovski (Macedonia)

26 April UEFA Euro 1996 qualifying	Moldova	0–3	Bulgaria	Chişinău, Moldova
18:00 UTC+3		Report	Balakov 30'; Stoichkov 57', 67'	Stadium: Stadionul Republican; Attendance: 16,000; Referee: Jiří Ulrich (Czech Republic)

7 June UEFA Euro 1996 qualifying	Bulgaria	3–2	Germany	Sofia, Bulgaria
20:30 UTC+3	Stoichkov 45' (pen.), 66' (pen.); Kostadinov 69'	Report	Klinsmann 18'; Strunz 44'	Stadium: Vasil Levski National Stadium; Attendance: 44,208; Referee: Pierluigi Pairetto (Italy)

20 July Merdeka Tournament group stage	Uzbekistan	0–0	Bulgaria	Kuala Lumpur, Malaysia
20:00 UTC+8		Report		Stadium: Merdeka Stadium; Attendance: 7,500; Referee: Mohd Nazri Abdullah (Malaysia)

22 July Merdeka Tournament group stage	Vasas SC	0–0	Bulgaria	Kuala Lumpur, Malaysia
20:00 UTC+8		Report		Stadium: Merdeka Stadium; Attendance: 8,000; Referee: Nik Ahmad Yaakub (Malaysia)

25 July Merdeka Tournament semi-final	Iraq	1–0	Bulgaria	Kuala Lumpur, Malaysia
	Fawzi 69'	Report		Stadium: Merdeka Stadium; Attendance: 12,000; Referee: Jamal Al Sharif (Syria)

29 July Merdeka Tournament third place play-off	Malaysia	0–2	Bulgaria	Kuala Lumpur, Malaysia
		Report	Zhabov 79'; Bachev 90'	Stadium: Merdeka Stadium; Attendance: 20,000; Referee: Han Nam-shik (South Korea)

6 September UEFA Euro 1996 qualifying	Albania	1–1	Bulgaria	Tirana, Albania
16:30 UTC+1	Rraklli 16'	Report	Stoichkov 8'	Stadium: Qemal Stafa Stadium; Attendance: 6,050; Referee: Charles Agius (Malta)

7 October UEFA Euro 1996 qualifying	Bulgaria	3–0	Albania	Sofia, Bulgaria
18:00 UTC+2	Letchkov 15'; Kostadinov 80', 82'	Report		Stadium: Vasil Levski National Stadium; Attendance: 25,000; Referee: Juha Hirviniemi (Finland)

11 October UEFA Euro 1996 qualifying	Georgia	2–1	Bulgaria	Tbilisi, Georgia
18:00 UTC+4	Arveladze 1'; Kinkladze 47' (pen.)	Report	Stoichkov 87'	Stadium: Boris Paichadze National Stadium; Attendance: 45,000; Referee: Urs Meier (Switzerland)

15 November UEFA Euro 1996 qualifying	Germany	3–1	Bulgaria	Berlin, Germany
19:45 UTC+1	Klinsmann 50', 75' (pen.); Häßler 56'	Report	Stoichkov 47'	Stadium: Olympiastadion; Attendance: 75,841; Referee: Vassilios Nikakis (Greece)

=== 1996 ===
27 March Friendly	England	1–0	Bulgaria	London, England
20:00 UTC+0	Ferdinand 7'	Report		Stadium: British Empire Exhibition Stadium; Attendance: 29,708; Referee: Günter Benkö (Austria)

24 April Friendly	Slovakia	0–0	Bulgaria	Trnava, Slovakia
		Report		Stadium: Štadión Spartaka; Attendance: 10,927; Referee: István Vad (Hungary)

28 May Friendly	Bulgaria	3–0	Macedonia	Sofia, Bulgaria
	Kostadinov 15'; Stoichkov 67'; I. Georgiev 77'	Report		Stadium: Vasil Levski National Stadium; Attendance: 980; Referee: Branimir Babarogić (Yugoslavia)

2 June Friendly	Bulgaria	4–1	United Arab Emirates	Sofia, Bulgaria
	Yordanov 6'; Stoichkov 29'; Donkov 69'; Sirakov 79'	Report	Bakheet 38'	Stadium: Vasil Levski National Stadium; Attendance: 12,000; Referee: Sabri Çelik (Turkey)

9 June UEFA Euro 1996 group stage	Spain	1–1	Bulgaria	Leeds, England
14:30 UTC+1	Alfonso 74'	Report	Stoichkov 65' (pen.)	Stadium: Elland Road; Attendance: 24,006; Referee: Piero Ceccarini (Italy)

13 June UEFA Euro 1996 group stage	Bulgaria	1–0	Romania	Newcastle upon Tyne, England
16:30 UTC+1	Stoichkov 3'	Report		Stadium: St James' Park; Attendance: 19,107; Referee: Peter Mikkelsen (Denmark)

18 June UEFA Euro 1996 group stage	France	3–1	Bulgaria	Newcastle upon Tyne, England
16:30 UTC+1	Blanc 21'; Penev 63' (o.g.); Loko 90'	Report	Stoichkov 69'	Stadium: St James' Park; Attendance: 26,976; Referee: Dermot Gallagher (England) (Note: Gallagher suffered an injury in the 28th minute and was replaced by fourth official Paul Durkin (England).)

1 September 1998 FIFA World Cup qualification	Israel	2–1	Bulgaria	Ramat Gan, Israel
18:00 UTC+3	R. Harazi 34'; Banin 62' (pen.)	Report	Balakov 3' (pen.)	Stadium: National Stadium; Attendance: 13,200; Referee: Alfredo Trentalange (Italy)

8 October 1998 FIFA World Cup qualification	Luxembourg	1–2	Bulgaria	Luxembourg City, Luxembourg
20:00 UTC+2	Langers 20'	Report	Balakov 14' (pen.); Kostadinov 37'	Stadium: Stade Josy Barthel; Attendance: 3,775; Referee: Yevi Kollari (Albania)

6 November Friendly	Saudi Arabia	1–0	Bulgaria	Riyadh, Saudi Arabia
	Al-Muwallid 6'	Report		Stadium: King Fahd International Stadium; Attendance: 30,000; Referee: Abdul Rahman Al-Zaid (Saudi Arabia)

8 November Friendly	Thailand	0–4	Bulgaria	Bangkok, Thailand
		Report	M. Hristov 12', 28'; Kostadinov 40'; Borimirov 58'	Stadium: National Stadium; Attendance: 20,000; Referee: Sinktchun (Thailand)

14 December 1998 FIFA World Cup qualification	Cyprus	1–3	Bulgaria	Limassol, Cyprus
16:00 UTC+2	Pittas 29'	Report	Kostadinov 23'; Balakov 34'; I. Iliev 70'	Stadium: Tsirio Stadium; Attendance: 6,500; Referee: John Rowbotham (Scotland)

=== 1997 ===
11 March Friendly	Bulgaria	0–1	Slovakia	Sofia, Bulgaria
		Report	Majoroš 81'	Stadium: Vasil Levski National Stadium; Attendance: 7,000; Referee: Metin Tokat (Turkey)

2 April 1998 FIFA World Cup qualification	Bulgaria	4–1	Cyprus	Sofia, Bulgaria
18:00 UTC+3	Borimirov 2'; Kostadinov 35', 45'; Yordanov 66'	Report	Okkas 62'	Stadium: Vasil Levski National Stadium; Attendance: 33,000; Referee: Serge Muhmenthaler (Switzerland)

8 June 1998 FIFA World Cup qualification	Bulgaria	4–0	Luxembourg	Burgas, Bulgaria
20:00 UTC+3	Stoichkov 43' (pen.); Kostadinov 47'; Balakov 50' (pen.); Letchkov 81'	Report		Stadium: Neftochimic Stadium; Attendance: 20,000; Referee: Lucílio Batista (Portugal)

20 August 1998 FIFA World Cup qualification	Bulgaria	1–0	Israel	Sofia, Bulgaria
20:00 UTC+3	Penev 65'	Report		Stadium: Vasil Levski National Stadium; Attendance: 32,000; Referee: Sándor Piller (Hungary)

10 September 1998 FIFA World Cup qualification	Bulgaria	1–0	Russia	Sofia, Bulgaria
19:30 UTC+3	T. Ivanov 55'	Report		Stadium: Vasil Levski National Stadium; Attendance: 55,000; Referee: Václav Krondl (Czech Republic)

11 October 1998 FIFA World Cup qualification	Russia	4–2	Bulgaria	Moscow, Russia
19:00 UTC+4	Alenichev 13', 57'; Kolyvanov 41'; Yuran 52'	Report	Gruev 68'; Kostadinov 78'	Stadium: Luzhniki Stadium; Attendance: 19,000; Referee: Pierluigi Pairetto (Italy)

=== 1998 ===
10 March Friendly	Argentina	2–0	Bulgaria	Buenos Aires, Argentina
	Batistuta 35'; López 86'	Report		Stadium: José Amalfitani Stadium; Attendance: 21,291; Referee: Gustavo Méndez (Uruguay)

25 March Friendly	Macedonia	1–0	Bulgaria	Skopje, Macedonia
	Hristov 40'	Report		Stadium: City Stadium; Attendance: 8,000; Referee: Zdravko Savić (Yugoslavia)

22 April Friendly	Bulgaria	2–1	Morocco	Sofia, Bulgaria
	Penev 10' (pen.); Stoilov 79'	Report	Bassir 80'	Stadium: Vasil Levski National Stadium; Attendance: 18,000; Referee: Slavko Radulović (Yugoslavia)

5 June Friendly	Bulgaria	2–0	Algeria	Sofia, Bulgaria
	Stoichkov 33'; Yordanov 84'	Report		Stadium: Vasil Levski National Stadium; Attendance: 20,000; Referee: Éric Romain (Belgium)

12 June 1998 FIFA World Cup group stage	Paraguay	0–0	Bulgaria	Montpellier, France
14:30 UTC+1		Report		Stadium: Stade de la Mosson; Attendance: 29,800; Referee: Abdul Rahman Al-Zeid (Saudi Arabia)

19 June 1998 FIFA World Cup group stage	Nigeria	1–0	Bulgaria	Paris, France
17:30 UTC+1	Ikpeba 28'	Report		Stadium: Parc des Princes; Attendance: 45,500; Referee: Mario Sánchez Yantén (Chile)

24 June 1998 FIFA World Cup group stage	Spain	6–1	Bulgaria	Lens, France
21:00 UTC+1	Hierro 6' (pen.); Luis Enrique 18'; Morientes 55', 81'; Bachev 88' (o.g.); Kiko 90+4'	Report	Kostadinov 58'	Stadium: Stade Félix-Bollaert; Attendance: 38,100; Referee: Mario van der Ende (Netherlands)

6 September UEFA Euro 2000 qualifying	Bulgaria	0–3	Poland	Burgas, Bulgaria
20:30 UTC+3		Report	Czereszewski 19', 44'; Iwan 48'	Stadium: Neftochimic Stadium; Attendance: 17,100; Referee: Marc Batta (France)

10 October UEFA Euro 2000 qualifying	England	0–0	Bulgaria	London, England
15:00 UTC+1		Report		Stadium: British Empire Exhibition Stadium; Attendance: 72,974; Referee: László Vágner (Hungary)

14 October UEFA Euro 2000 qualifying	Bulgaria	0–1	Sweden	Burgas, Bulgaria
19:30 UTC+3		Report	Larsson 62'	Stadium: Neftochimic Stadium; Attendance: 12,021; Referee: Bernd Heynemann (Germany)

4 November Friendly	Bulgaria	0–0	Algeria	Sofia, Bulgaria
		Report		Stadium: Vasil Levski National Stadium; Attendance: 1,500; Referee: Kostadin Gerginov (Bulgaria)

24 December Friendly	Morocco	4–1	Bulgaria	Agadir, Morocco
	Naybet 30'; Hadda 44'; Bassir 61'; Ramzi 74'	Report	Bachev 56'	Stadium: Stade Al Inbiaâte; Attendance: 25,000; Referee: Abderrahim Larjoune (Morocco)

=== 1999 ===
16 February Lunar New Year Cup semi-final	Egypt	3–1	Bulgaria	Mong Kok, Hong Kong
18:00 UTC+8	H. Hassan 11', 31'; Emam 81'	Report	Yovov 88'	Stadium: Mong Kok Stadium; Attendance: 30,000; Referee: Willie Young (Scotland)

3 March Friendly	Bulgaria	2–0	Slovakia	Stara Zagora, Bulgaria
	I. Iliev 21'; Yovov 41'	Report		Stadium: Beroe Stadium; Attendance: 33,000; Referee: Miroslav Radoman (Yugoslavia)

27 March Friendly	Belgium	0–1	Bulgaria	Brussels, Belgium
20:00 UTC+1		Report	Yovov 10'	Stadium: King Baudouin Stadium; Attendance: 23,412; Referee: Domenico Messina (Italy)

31 March UEFA Euro 2000 qualifying	Luxembourg	0–2	Bulgaria	Luxembourg City, Luxembourg
20:00 UTC+2		Report	Stoichkov 18'; Yordanov 38'	Stadium: Stade Josy Barthel; Attendance: 3,004; Referee: Milan Mitrovič (Slovenia)

19 May Friendly	Slovakia	2–0	Bulgaria	Dubnica nad Váhom, Slovakia
	Timko 9'; Tomaschek 89'	Report		Stadium: Kerametal Stadium; Attendance: 6,600; Referee: Hartmut Strampe (Germany)

4 June UEFA Euro 2000 qualifying	Poland	2–0	Bulgaria	Warsaw, Poland
20:30 UTC+2	Hajto 15'; Iwan 62'	Report		Stadium: Stadion Wojska Polskiego; Attendance: 6,266; Referee: Stefano Braschi (Italy)

9 June UEFA Euro 2000 qualifying	Bulgaria	1–1	England	Sofia, Bulgaria
19:30 UTC+3	Markov 18'	Report	Shearer 15'	Stadium: Bulgarian Army Stadium; Attendance: 17,500; Referee: Mario van der Ende (Netherlands)

18 August Friendly	Ukraine	1–1	Bulgaria	Kyiv, Ukraine
19:00 UTC+3	Rebrov 83' (pen.)	Report	I. Petkov 90'	Stadium: Dynamo Stadium; Attendance: 15,000; Referee: Romāns Lajuks (Latvia)

4 September UEFA Euro 2000 qualifying	Sweden	1–0	Bulgaria	Solna, Sweden
18:00 UTC+2	Alexandersson 65'	Report		Stadium: Råsunda Stadium; Attendance: 35,640; Referee: Dani Koren (Israel)

9 October UEFA Euro 2000 qualifying	Bulgaria	3–0	Luxembourg	Sofia, Bulgaria
18:00 UTC+3	Borimirov 40'; I. Petkov 68'; R. Hristov 78'	Report		Stadium: Bulgarian Army Stadium; Attendance: 2,000; Referee: Ladislav Gadoši (Slovakia)

17 November Friendly	Greece	1–0	Bulgaria	Kozani, Greece
	Kyparissis 62'	Report		Stadium: Kozani Stadium; Attendance: 7,896; Referee: Luc Huyghe (Belgium)
