= UEFA Euro 2000 qualifying Group 3 =

Football tournament qualification stage

Standings and results for Group 3 of the UEFA Euro 2000 qualifying tournament.

== Standings ==
Pos	Team	Pld	W	D	L	GF	GA	GD	Pts	Qualification	(Germany)	(Turkey)	(Finland)	(Northern Ireland)	(Moldova)
1	Germany	8	6	1	1	20	4	+16	19	Qualify for final tournament	—	0–0	2–0	4–0	6–1
2	Turkey	8	5	2	1	15	6	+9	17	Advance to play-offs	1–0	—	1–3	3–0	2–0
3	Finland	8	3	1	4	13	13	0	10		1–2	2–4	—	4–1	3–2
4	Northern Ireland	8	1	2	5	4	19	−15	5		0–3	0–3	1–0	—	2–2
5	Moldova	8	0	4	4	7	17	−10	4		1–3	1–1	0–0	0–0	—

Source: UEFA
Rules for classification: Qualification tiebreakers

== Matches ==
5 September 1998
19:00 UTC+3

Finland	3–2	Moldova
Kolkka 8'; Johansson 44'; Paatelainen 63'	Report	Oprea 10', 12'

Olympic Stadium, Helsinki
Attendance: 18,717
Referee: Graham Barber (England)
5 September 1998
20:30 UTC+3

Turkey	3–0	Northern Ireland
Oktay 18', 58'; Tayfur 50'	Report

Ali Sami Yen Stadium, Istanbul
Attendance: 19,840
Referee: Ryszard Wójcik (Poland)

10 October 1998
15:00 UTC+1

Northern Ireland	1–0	Finland
Rowland 36'	Report

Windsor Park, Belfast
Attendance: 10,002
Referee: Zoran Arsić (FR Yugoslavia)
10 October 1998
20:00 UTC+3

Turkey	1–0	Germany
Şükür 70'	Report

Atatürk Stadium, Bursa
Attendance: 17,505
Referee: Hugh Dallas (Scotland)

14 October 1998
20:30 UTC+3

Moldova	1–3	Germany
Guzun 6'	Report	Kirsten 19', 35'; Bierhoff 38'

Stadionul Republican, Chişinău
Attendance: 5,400
Referee: Juan Fernández Marín (Spain)
14 October 1998
20:30 UTC+3

Turkey	1–3	Finland
Ogün 74'	Report	Paatelainen 5'; Johansson 51'; Litmanen 90+6'

Ali Sami Yen Stadium, Istanbul
Attendance: 20,420
Referee: Václav Krondl (Czech Republic)

18 November 1998
20:00 UTC

Northern Ireland	2–2	Moldova
Dowie 49'; Lennon 63'	Report	Gaidamașciuc 22'; Testemițanu 56'

Windsor Park, Belfast
Attendance: 11,142
Referee: Vladimír Hriňák (Slovakia)

27 March 1999
15:00 UTC

Northern Ireland	0–3	Germany
	Report	Bode 11', 43'; Morrow 62' (o.g.)

Windsor Park, Belfast
Attendance: 14,270
Referee: Graziano Cesari (Italy)
27 March 1999
19:00 UTC+2

Turkey	2–0	Moldova
Şükür 34'; Sergen 90'	Report

Ali Sami Yen Stadium, Istanbul
Attendance: 19,454
Referee: Konrad Plautz (Austria)

31 March 1999
20:30 UTC+2

Germany	2–0	Finland
Jeremies 31'; Neuville 37'	Report

Frankenstadion, Nuremberg
Attendance: 40,758
Referee: Sergei Khusainov (Russia)
31 March 1999
19:00 UTC+3

Moldova	0–0	Northern Ireland
	Report

Stadionul Republican, Chişinău
Attendance: 9,237
Referee: Edo Trivković (Croatia)

4 June 1999
20:30 UTC+2

Germany	6–1	Moldova
Bierhoff 2', 56', 82'; Kirsten 27'; Bode 38'; Scholl 71'	Report	Șișchin 76'

BayArena, Leverkusen
Attendance: 21,000
Referee: Jorge Monteiro Coroado (Portugal)
5 June 1999
19:00 UTC+3

Finland	2–4	Turkey
Tihinen 10'; Paatelainen 14'	Report	Tayfur 25', 84'; Şükür 34', 87'

Olympic Stadium, Helsinki
Attendance: 36,042
Referee: Dick Jol (Netherlands)

9 June 1999
19:00 UTC+3

Moldova	0–0	Finland
	Report

Stadionul Republican, Chişinău
Attendance: 6,100
Referee: Florenzo Treossi (Italy)

4 September 1999
20:00 UTC+3

Finland	1–2	Germany
Salli 63'	Report	Bierhoff 2', 17'

Olympic Stadium, Helsinki
Attendance: 20,184
Referee: Antonio Jesús Lõpez Nieto (Spain)
4 September 1999
15:00 UTC+1

Northern Ireland	0–3	Turkey
	Report	Arif 45', 46', 48'

Windsor Park, Belfast
Attendance: 7,270
Referee: Alain Sars (France)

8 September 1999
20:30 UTC+2

Germany	4–0	Northern Ireland
Bierhoff 2'; Ziege 16', 33', 45'	Report

Westfalenstadion, Dortmund
Attendance: 41,000
Referee: Georgios Bikas (Greece)
8 September 1999
20:30 UTC+3

Moldova	1–1	Turkey
Epureanu 3'	Report	Tayfur 76'

Stadionul Republican, Chişinău
Attendance: 4,500
Referee: Andreas Schluchter (Switzerland)

9 October 1999
19:30 UTC+2

Germany	0–0	Turkey
	Report

Olympiastadion, Munich
Attendance: 63,572
Referee: Pierluigi Collina (Italy)
9 October 1999
19:00 UTC+3

Finland	4–1	Northern Ireland
Johansson 9'; Hyypiä 63'; Kolkka 73', 83'	Report	Whitley 59'

Olympic Stadium, Helsinki
Attendance: 8,217
Referee: Armand Ancion (Belgium)

== Goalscorers ==
There were 59 goals scored in 20 matches, for an average of 2.95 goals per match.

7 goals

- (Germany) Oliver Bierhoff

4 goals

- (Turkey) Tayfur Havutçu
- (Turkey) Hakan Şükür

3 goals

- (Finland) Jonatan Johansson
- (Finland) Joonas Kolkka
- (Finland) Mixu Paatelainen
- (Germany) Marco Bode
- (Germany) Ulf Kirsten
- (Germany) Christian Ziege
- (Turkey) Arif Erdem

2 goals

- (Moldova) Igor Oprea
- (Turkey) Oktay Derelioğlu

1 goal

- (Finland) Sami Hyypiä
- (Finland) Jari Litmanen
- (Finland) Janne Salli
- (Finland) Hannu Tihinen
- (Germany) Jens Jeremies
- (Germany) Oliver Neuville
- (Germany) Mehmet Scholl
- (Moldova) Sergiu Epureanu
- (Moldova) Vladimir Gaidamașciuc
- (Moldova) Alexandru Guzun
- (Moldova) Gheorghe Stratulat
- (Moldova) Ion Testemițanu
- (Northern Ireland) Iain Dowie
- (Northern Ireland) Neil Lennon
- (Northern Ireland) Keith Rowland
- (Northern Ireland) Jeff Whitley
- (Turkey) Ogün Temizkanoğlu
- (Turkey) Sergen Yalçın

1 own goal

- (Northern Ireland) Steve Morrow (against Germany)
