= 1989–90 Bulgarian Cup =

Tournament details
- Country: Bulgaria

Final positions
- Champions: Sliven (1st cup)
- Runners-up: CSKA Sofia

Tournament statistics
- Top goal scorer(s): Yordan Lechkov (Sliven) (5 goals)

The 1989–90 Bulgarian Cup was the 50th season of the Bulgarian Cup. Sliven won the competition for first time, beating CSKA Sofia 2–0 in the final at the Hristo Botev Stadium in Gabrovo.

== First round ==
Team 1	Agg.	Team 2	1st leg	2nd leg
1989
Botev Plovdiv	5–5 (a)	Dobrudzha Dobrich	4–2	1–3
Spartak Pleven	1–4	Marek Dupnitsa	1–0	0–4
Montana	2–4	Yantra Gabrovo	2–1	0–3
Akademik Svishtov	4–6	Lokomotiv StZ	4–2	0–4
Velbazhd Kyustendil	1–7	Sliven	1–1	0–6
Lokomotiv Plovdiv	0–2	Botev Vratsa	0–1	0–1
Spartak Varna	2–3	Dunav Ruse	0–1	2–2
Minyor Pernik	2–4	Vihren Sandanski	1–0	1–4
Beroe Stara Zagora	5–4	Pirin Blagoevgrad	3–2	2–2
Tundzha Yambol	2–4	Slavia Sofia	1–1	1–3
Hebar Pazardzhik	3–4	Lokomotiv Sofia	2–2	1–2
Etar Veliko Tarnovo	6–2	Ludogorets Razgrad	4–1	2–1
Lokomotiv GO	1–2	Cherno More Varna	1–1	0–1

== Second round ==
In this round include the three teams, who participated in the European tournaments (CSKA, Levski and Chernomorets)

Team 1	Agg.	Team 2	1st leg	2nd leg
14 / 21 February 1990
Chernomorets Burgas	0–7	CSKA Sofia	0–2	0–5
7 / 21 March 1990
Dobrudzha Dobrich	1–2	Marek Dupnitsa	1–1	0–1
Lokomotiv StZ	3–4	Yantra Gabrovo	2–1	1–3
Vihren Sandanski	4–4 (a)	Cherno More Varna	4–2	0–2
Levski Sofia	3–2	Dunav Ruse	2–0	1–2
Etar Veliko Tarnovo	3–3 (a)	Botev Vratsa	0–1	3–2
Lokomotiv Sofia	3–5	Slavia Sofia	3–3	0–2
Sliven	6–3	Beroe Stara Zagora	6–1	0–2

== Quarter-finals ==
Team 1	Agg.	Team 2	1st leg	2nd leg
27 March / 11 April 1990
Levski Sofia	4–6	Slavia Sofia	1–4	3–2
Etar Veliko Tarnovo	4–2	Marek Dupnitsa	4–1	0–1
Yantra Gabrovo	2–2 (a)	Sliven	2–2	0–0
Cherno More Varna	1–2	CSKA Sofia	1–1	0–1

== Semi-finals ==
Team 1	Agg.	Team 2	1st leg	2nd leg
25 April / 16 May 1990
CSKA Sofia	4–0	Slavia Sofia	3–0	1–0
Etar Veliko Tarnovo	2–2 (a)	Sliven	1–2	1–0

== Final ==
=== Details ===
30 May 1990

CSKA Sofia	0–2	Sliven
		Valkov 40'; Lechkov 76'

Hristo Botev Stadium, Gabrovo
Attendance: 15,000
Referee: Stefan Chakarov (Veliko Tarnovo)

CSKA	Sliven
