= Stratulat =

Stratulat is a Moldovan or Romanian surname. Notable people with the surname include:

- Gheorghe Stratulat (born 1976), Moldovan footballer
- Natalia Stratulat (born 1987), Moldovan discus thrower
