= UEFA Euro 1996 qualifying Group 7 =

Football tournament qualification stage

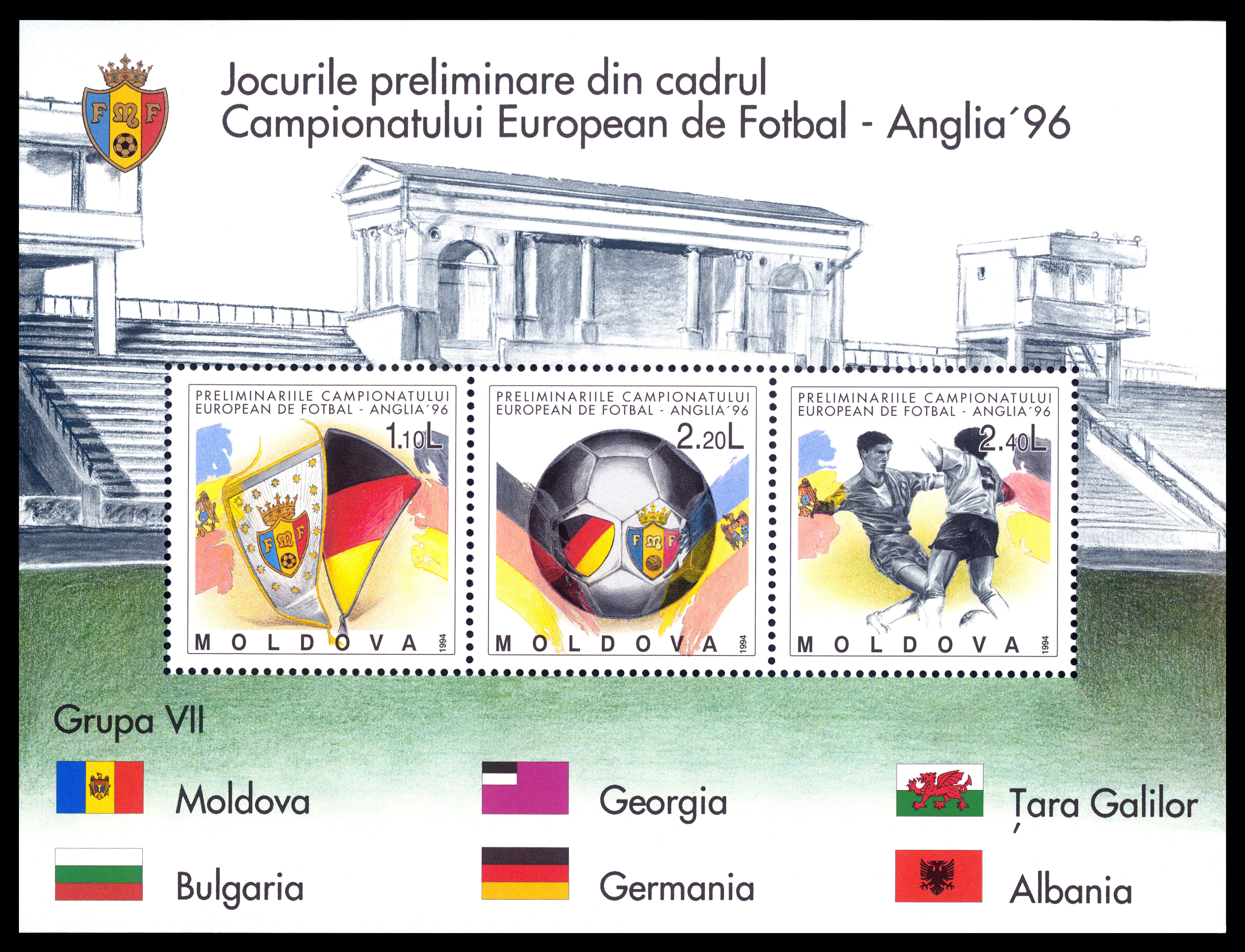
A 1994 postage stamp from Moldova depicting Group 7 of the UEFA Euro 1996 qualifying process.

Qualifying Group 7 for the 1996 UEFA European Football Championship took place between 7 September 1994 and 15 November 1995 and consisted of Germany, Wales, Bulgaria, Georgia, Albania and Moldova.

Following the dissolution of the Soviet Union, the tournament marked the first competitive matches for Georgia and Moldova.

Germany qualified for UEFA Euro 1996 after defeating Bulgaria 3–1 in their final match to finish as group winners. They were then joined by Bulgaria, who finished as one of the six best runners-up, in qualifying for the tournament.

== Background ==
Following the Revolutions of 1989, the Soviet Union was dissolved and ceased to exist on 26 December 1991. As a result, neither Georgia nor Moldova had played any competitive matches before.

UEFA Euro 1996 would be the first UEFA European Championship to feature 16 teams in the finals. Previous editions had only seen four or eight teams qualify.

Previously, a reunified Germany had qualified for the UEFA European Championships once before in 1992. Denmark had also qualified four times previously and were the defending champions after winning the competition in 1992 but neither Wales, Bulgaria nor Albania had reached the finals.

== Format ==
The group was contested as a double round robin in which each team would play every other team twice – once at home and once away. The group winner would qualify for UEFA Euro 1996. Of the eight groups, the six best runners-up would also qualify. The remaining two runners-up would contest a play-off to determine the final qualifier.

== Summary ==
The group began on 7 September 1994 when Moldova defeated Georgia 1–0 and Wales defeated Albania 2–0. The following month, Moldova edged out Wales 3–2 and Bulgaria defeated Georgia 2–0. In November, Georgia, Germany and Bulgaria recorded wins against Wales, Albania and Moldova respectively. The following month, Georgia, Germany and Bulgaria recorded wins against Albania, Moldova and Wales respectively before, in the final match of 1994, Germany defeated Albania 2–1. That left Bulgaria and Germany top of the standings with nine points ahead of Georgia and Moldova on six points.

In March 1995, Albania, Germany and Bulgaria recorded wins against Moldova, Georgia and Wales respectively. The following month, Georgia and Bulgaria recorded wins against Albania and Moldova respectively before Wales held Germany to a 1–1 draw. In June, Albania, Bulgaria and Georgia recorded wins against Moldova, Germany and Wales respectively. That left Bulgaria clear at the top with 18 points from a possible 18, ahead of Germany on 13 points and Georgia on 12 points.

Bulgaria's 100 per cent record was ended by Albania who held them to a 1–1 draw in September. Germany defeated Georgia 4–1 and Wales edged out Moldova 1–0. The following month, Bulgaria and Germany assured themselves of the top two places after defeating Albania and Moldova respectively. The teams would be level on points going into the final round of fixtures after Georgia defeated Bulgaria 2–1 and Germany defeated Wales by the same scoreline. On 15 November, Albania drew with Wales and Moldova defeated Georgia 3–2 before Germany qualified for UEFA Euro 1996 by defeating Bulgaria 3–1 to finish as group winners. Bulgaria would also qualify as one of the six best runners-up.

== Standings ==
Pos	Team	Pld	W	D	L	GF	GA	GD	Pts	Qualification	(Germany)	(Bulgaria)	(Georgia (country))	(Moldova)	(Wales)	(Albania)
1	Germany	10	8	1	1	27	10	+17	25	Qualify for final tournament	—	3–1	4–1	6–1	1–1	2–1
2	Bulgaria	10	7	1	2	24	10	+14	22	Qualify for final tournament	3–2	—	2–0	4–1	3–1	3–0
3	Georgia	10	5	0	5	14	13	+1	15		0–2	2–1	—	0–1	5–0	2–0
4	Moldova	10	3	0	7	11	27	−16	9		0–3	0–3	3–2	—	3–2	2–3
5	Wales	10	2	2	6	9	19	−10	8 (Note: Head-to-head points: Wales 4, Albania 1.)		1–2	0–3	0–1	1–0	—	2–0
6	Albania	10	2	2	6	10	16	−6	8		1–2	1–1	0–1	3–0	1–1	—

Rules for classification: Qualification tiebreakers

== Results ==
7 September 1994
18:30 UTC+4

Georgia	0–1	Moldova
		Oprea 40'

Boris Paichadze Stadium, Tbilisi
Attendance: 62,000
Referee: Ahmet Çakar (Turkey)
7 September 1994
19:30 UTC+1

Wales	2–0	Albania
Coleman 9'; Giggs 67'

Cardiff Arms Park, Cardiff
Attendance: 15,791
Referee: Gianni Beschin (Italy)

12 October 1994
19:00 UTC+2

Moldova	3–2	Wales
Belous 8'; Secu 28'; Pogorelov 76'		Speed 5'; Blake 67'

Stadionul Republican, Chişinău
Attendance: 12,000
Referee: István Vad Sr. (Hungary)
12 October 1994
19:00 UTC+2

Bulgaria	2–0	Georgia
Kostadinov 58', 63'

Vasil Levski National Stadium, Sofia
Attendance: 48,000
Referee: Ladislav Gadoši (Slovakia)

16 November 1994
14:00 UTC+1

Albania	1–2	Germany
Zmijani 32'		Klinsmann 18'; Kirsten 46'

Qemal Stafa Stadium, Tirana
Attendance: 18,500
Referee: Vasiliy Melnichuk (Ukraine)
16 November 1994
18:00 UTC+2

Bulgaria	4–1	Moldova
Stoichkov 43', 85'; Balakov 63'; Kostadinov 87'		Cleșcenco 61'

Vasil Levski National Stadium, Sofia
Attendance: 36,048
Referee: Denis McArdle (Ireland)
16 November 1994
14:00 UTC+4

Georgia	5–0	Wales
Ketsbaia 31', 49'; Kinkladze 41'; Gogrichiani 59'; Arveladze 67'

Boris Paichadze Stadium, Tbilisi
Attendance: 45,000
Referee: Alain Sars (France)

14 December 1994
19:00 UTC+2

Moldova	0–3	Germany
		Kirsten 7'; Klinsmann 38'; Matthäus 72'

Stadionul Republican, Chişinău
Attendance: 20,000
Referee: Jef van Vliet (Netherlands)
14 December 1994
19:30 UTC

Wales	0–3	Bulgaria
		Ivanov 5'; Kostadinov 16'; Stoichkov 51'

Cardiff Arms Park, Cardiff
Attendance: 23,206
Referee: Leif Sundell (Sweden)
14 December 1994
14:00 UTC+1

Albania	0–1	Georgia
		Arveladze 19'

Qemal Stafa Stadium, Tirana
Attendance: 9,700
Referee: László Molnár (Hungary)

18 December 1994
15:30 UTC+1

Germany	2–1	Albania
Matthäus 8'; Klinsmann 17'		Rraklli 58'

Fritz-Walter-Stadion, Kaiserslautern
Attendance: 20,310
Referee: Svend Erik Christensen (Denmark)

29 March 1995
21:00 UTC+5

Georgia	0–2	Germany
		Klinsmann 24', 45'

Boris Paichadze Stadium, Tbilisi
Attendance: 75,000
Referee: Martin Bodenham (England)
29 March 1995
19:00 UTC+3

Bulgaria	3–1	Wales
Balakov 37'; Penev 70', 82'		Saunders 83'

Vasil Levski National Stadium, Sofia
Attendance: 60,000
Referee: Michel Piraux (Belgium)
29 March 1995
15:30 UTC+2

Albania	3–0	Moldova
Kushta 31', 80'; Kaçaj 41'

Qemal Stafa Stadium, Tirana
Attendance: 8,500
Referee: Urs Meier (Switzerland)

26 April 1995
18:00 UTC+5

Georgia	2–0	Albania
S.Arveladze 3'; Ketsbaia 42'

Boris Paichadze Stadium, Tbilisi
Attendance: 25,000
Referee: Roelof Luinge (Netherlands)
26 April 1995
18:00 UTC+3

Moldova	0–3	Bulgaria
		Balakov 30'; Stoichkov 57', 67'

Stadionul Republican, Chişinău
Attendance: 16,000
Referee: Jiří Ulrich (Czech Republic)
26 April 1995
19:45 UTC+2

Germany	1–1	Wales
Herrlich 42'		Saunders 8'

Rheinstadion, Düsseldorf
Attendance: 43,461
Referee: José Encinar (Spain)

7 June 1995
20:30 UTC+3

Bulgaria	3–2	Germany
Stoichkov 45' (pen.), 66' (pen.); Kostadinov 69'		Klinsmann 18'; Strunz 44'

Vasil Levski National Stadium, Sofia
Attendance: 44,208
Referee: Pierluigi Pairetto (Italy)
7 June 1995
19:30 UTC+1

Wales	0–1	Georgia
		Kinkladze 73'

Cardiff Arms Park, Cardiff
Attendance: 8,241
Referee: Ilkka Koho (Finland)
7 June 1995
19:00 UTC+3

Moldova	2–3	Albania
Curteian 10'; Cleșcenco 15'		Kushta 8'; Bellaj 25'; Vata 71'

Stadionul Republican, Chişinău
Attendance: 7,000
Referee: Léon Schellings (Belgium)

6 September 1995
16:30 UTC+2

Albania	1–1	Bulgaria
Rraklli 16'		Stoichkov 8'

Qemal Stafa Stadium, Tirana
Attendance: 6,050
Referee: Charles Agius (Malta)
6 September 1995
19:45 UTC+2

Germany	4–1	Georgia
Möller 39'; Ziege 57'; Kirsten 62'; Babbel 72'		Ketsbaia 28'

Frankenstadion, Nuremberg
Attendance: 40,750
Referee: Jim McCluskey (Scotland)
6 September 1995
19:30 UTC+1

Wales	1–0	Moldova
Speed 55'

Cardiff Arms Park, Cardiff
Attendance: 6,721
Referee: Gylfi Thór Orrason (Iceland)

7 October 1995
18:00 UTC+2

Bulgaria	3–0	Albania
Letchkov 15'; Kostadinov 80', 82'

Vasil Levski National Stadium, Sofia
Attendance: 25,000
Referee: Juha Hirviniemi (Finland)

8 October 1995
18:00 UTC+1

Germany	6–1	Moldova
Stroenco 16' (o.g.); Helmer 18'; Sammer 24', 72'; Möller 47', 61'		Rebeja 82'

Ulrich Haberland Stadion, Leverkusen
Attendance: 18,400
Referee: Zygmunt Ziober (Poland)

11 October 1995
18:00 UTC+4

Georgia	2–1	Bulgaria
Arveladze 1'; Kinkladze 47' (pen.)		Stoichkov 87'

Boris Paichadze Stadium, Tbilisi
Attendance: 45,000
Referee: Urs Meier (Switzerland)
11 October 1995
20:30 UTC+1

Wales	1–2	Germany
Symons 79'		Melville 75' (o.g.); Klinsmann 81'

Cardiff Arms Park, Cardiff
Attendance: 27,000
Referee: Ion Crăciunescu (Romania)

15 November 1995
19:45 UTC+1

Germany	3–1	Bulgaria
Klinsmann 50', 75' (pen.); Häßler 56'		Stoichkov 47'

Olympiastadion, Berlin
Attendance: 75,841
Referee: Vassilios Nikakis (Greece)
15 November 1995
14:00 UTC+1

Albania	1–1	Wales
Kushta 5' (pen.)		Pembridge 43'

Qemal Stafa Stadium, Tirana
Attendance: 2,100
Referee: David Suheil (Israel)
15 November 1995
18:00 UTC+2

Moldova	3–2	Georgia
Testemițanu 5' (pen.); Miterev 17', 68'		D. Janashia 66'; Culibaba 77' (o.g.)

Stadionul Republican, Chișinău
Attendance: 6,000
Referee: Mario van der Ende (Netherlands)

== Goalscorers ==
There were 95 goals scored in 30 matches, for an average of 3.17 goals per match.

10 goals

- (Bulgaria national football team) Hristo Stoichkov

9 goals

- (Germany national football team) Jürgen Klinsmann

7 goals

- (Bulgaria national football team) Emil Kostadinov

4 goals

- (Albania national football team) Sokol Kushta
- (Georgia national football team) Shota Arveladze
- (Georgia national football team) Temur Ketsbaia

3 goals

- (Bulgaria national football team) Krasimir Balakov
- (Georgia national football team) Georgi Kinkladze
- (Germany national football team) Ulf Kirsten
- (Germany national football team) Andreas Möller

2 goals

- (Albania national football team) Altin Rraklli
- (Bulgaria national football team) Lyuboslav Penev
- (Germany national football team) Lothar Matthäus
- (Germany national football team) Matthias Sammer
- (Moldova national football team) Serghei Cleșcenco
- (Moldova national football team) Iurie Miterev
- (Wales national football team) Dean Saunders
- (Wales national football team) Gary Speed

1 goal

- (Albania national football team) Arjan Bellaj
- (Albania national football team) Salvador Kaçaj
- (Albania national football team) Rudi Vata
- (Albania national football team) Hysen Zmijani
- (Bulgaria national football team) Trifon Ivanov
- (Bulgaria national football team) Yordan Letchkov
- (Georgia national football team) Gocha Gogrichiani
- (Georgia national football team) Zaza Janashia
- (Germany national football team) Markus Babbel
- (Germany national football team) Thomas Häßler
- (Germany national football team) Thomas Helmer
- (Germany national football team) Heiko Herrlich
- (Germany national football team) Thomas Strunz
- (Germany national football team) Christian Ziege
- (Moldova national football team) Serghei Belous
- (Moldova national football team) Alexandru Curteian
- (Moldova national football team) Igor Oprea
- (Moldova national football team) Valeriu Pogorelov
- (Moldova national football team) Radu Rebeja
- (Moldova national football team) Serghei Secu
- (Moldova national football team) Ion Testemițanu
- (Wales national football team) Nathan Blake
- (Wales national football team) Chris Coleman
- (Wales national football team) Ryan Giggs
- (Wales national football team) Mark Pembridge
- (Wales national football team) Kit Symons

1 own goal

- (Moldova national football team) Vitali Culibaba (against Georgia)
- (Moldova national football team) Serghei Stroenco (against Germany)
- (Wales national football team) Andy Melville (against Germany)
