= 1992 Jordan International Tournament =

Tournament details
- Host country: Jordan
- Dates: 16–28 August 1992
- Teams: 8 (from 3 confederations)
- Venues: 2 (in 2 host cities)

Final positions
- Champions: Jordan (1st title)
- Runners-up: Iraq
- Third place: Moldova
- Fourth place: Congo

Tournament statistics
- Matches played: 16
- Goals scored: 57 (3.56 per match)
- Top scorer: (Iraq) Ahmed Radhi (7 goals)

The 1992 Jordan International Tournament was an international friendly soccer tournament. Matches were held in Amman and Arbid, held from 16–28 August 1992. (Note: The RSSSF lists several incorrect dates, including the opening match between Jordan and Pakistan, which was actually held on 16 August, not 20 August.)

== Participants ==
- (Republic of the Congo) Congo
- (Algeria) ES Setif
- Ethiopia
- Iraq
- Jordan
- Moldova
- Pakistan
- Sudan

== Group stage ==
=== Group A ===
Pos	Team	Pld	W	D	L	GF	GA	GD	Pts	
1	Jordan	3	3	0	0	6	0	+6	6	Semifinal
2	Moldova	3	2	0	1	7	2	+5	4	Semifinal
3	Sudan	3	1	0	2	5	5	0	2	
4	Pakistan	3	0	0	3	0	11	−11	0	

Updated to match(es) played on unknown. Source:
16 August 1992

Jordan	2–0	Pakistan
Tadrus 15', 54'	Report

Amman International Stadium
18 August 1992

Moldova	5–0	Pakistan
Scala 25'; Alexandrov 50', 55', 70', 75'	Report

Amman International Stadium, Amman, Jordan
Attendance: 15,000
Referee: Dirar Al Tamini (Jordan)

20 August 1992

Sudan	1–2	Moldova
Nejmi 60' (pen.)	Report	Spiridon 15'; Oprea 70'

Amman International Stadium, Amman, Jordan
Attendance: 10,100

22 August 1992

Jordan	3–0	Sudan
	Report

Amman International Stadium
24 August 1992

Jordan	1–0	Moldova
Tadrus 85'	Report

Amman International Stadium, Amman, Jordan
Attendance: 30,000
24 August 1992

Sudan	4–0	Pakistan
	Report

Amman International Stadium

=== Group B ===
Pos	Team	Pld	W	D	L	GF	GA	GD	Pts	
1	Iraq	3	3	0	0	19	0	+19	6	Semifinal
2	Congo	3	1	1	1	4	4	0	3	Semifinal
3	(Algeria) ES Setif	3	1	1	1	3	5	−2	3	
4	Ethiopia	3	0	0	3	2	19	−17	0	

Updated to match(es) played on unknown. Source:
18 August 1992

Iraq	13–0	Ethiopia
Radhi 4', 32', 55', 77', 90'; Hussein 5', 6'; Jafar 16', 73'; Qais 36', 89'; Saddam 74'; Kadhim 79'	Report

Al-Hassan Stadium
18 August 1992

ES Setif (Algeria)	1–1	Congo
	Report

Al-Hassan Stadium

20 August 1992

Iraq	3–0	Congo
Radhi 18', 57'; Saddam 35'	Report

Al-Hassan Stadium
20 August 1992

ES Setif (Algeria)	3–2	Ethiopia
	Report

Al-Hassan Stadium

22 August 1992

Iraq	3–0	(Algeria) ES Setif
Emmanuel 4' (?), 85'	Report

Al-Hassan Stadium
22 August 1992

Congo	3–0	Ethiopia
	Report

Al-Hassan Stadium

== Knockout stage ==
Semifinals
26 August – Irbid
Iraq	1
Moldova	0
26 August – Amman
Jordan	2
Congo	1

Final
28 August – Amman
Jordan	2
Iraq	0
Third place
28 August – Amman
Moldova	3
Congo	1

=== Semifinals ===
26 August 1992

Iraq	1–0	Moldova
Jafar 20'	Report

Al-Hassan Stadium
26 August 1992

Jordan	2–1 (a.e.t.)	Congo
	Report

Amman International Stadium

=== Third place play-off ===
28 August 1992

Moldova	3–1	Congo
Miterev 40', 59', 70'	Report	(??)

Amman International Stadium, Amman, Jordan
Attendance: 18,000

=== Final ===
28 August 1992

Jordan	2–0	Iraq
Hussein 60'; Abdul-Munim 90+2'	Report

Amman International Stadium

== Awards ==
1992 Jordan Tournament

Jordan
First title

== Statistics ==
=== Goalscorers ===
There were 57 goals scored in 16 matches, for an average of 3.56 goals per match.

7 goals

- (Iraq) Ahmed Radhi

4 goals

- (Moldova) Serghei Alexandrov

3 goals

- (Iraq) Akram Emmanuel
- (Iraq) Habib Jafar
- (Jordan) Jeris Tadrus
- (Moldova) Iurie Miterev

2 goals

- (Iraq) Laith Hussein
- (Iraq) Saad Qais
- (Iraq) Naeem Saddam

1 goal

- (Iraq) Mahdi Kadhim
- (Jordan) Arif Hussein
- (Jordan) Hisham Abdul-Munim
- (Moldova) Alexei Scala
- (Moldova) Alexandru Spiridon
- (Moldova) Igor Oprea
- (Sudan) Nejmi

== Hat-tricks ==
Jordan International Tournament hat-tricks
#	Player	G	Time of goals	For	Result	Against	Phase	Date	FIFA report
1.	Serghei Alexandrov	4	50', 55', 70', 75'	Moldova	5-0	Pakistan	Group stage	18 August 1992	Report
2.	Ahmed Radhi	5	4', 32', 55', 77', 90'	Iraq	13-0	Ethiopia	Group stage	18 August 1992	Report
3.	Akram Emmanuel	3	4', ?', 85'	Iraq	3-0	Algeria ES Setif	Group stage	22 August 1992	Report
4.	Iurie Miterev	3	40', 59', 70'	Moldova	3-1	Congo	Third place play-off	28 August 1992	Report
