= Abbas Obeid =

Iraqi footballer (born 1973)

Personal information
- Full name: Abbas Obeid Jassim
- Date of birth: 10 December 1973 (age 52)
- Place of birth: Baghdad, Iraq
- Height: 1.72 m (5 ft 8 in)
- Position: Midfielder

Senior career*
| Years | Team | Apps | (Gls) |
| 1993–1996 | Al-Talaba | | |
| 1996–1997 | Anyang LG Cheetahs | 27 | (3) |
| 1997 | → Pohang Steelers (loan) | 9 | (1) |
| 1997–2001 | Pohang Steelers | 85 | (10) |
| 2001–2007 | Bahrain SC | | |

International career
| 1995–2001 | Iraq | 21 | (5) |

Managerial career
- 2011–2012: Al-Talaba (Assist.)
- 2012–2013: Duhok (Assist.)
- 2013: Al-Naft (Assist.)
- 2013: Al-Minaa (Assist.)
- 2014: Al-Zawraa (Assist.)
- 2015: Naft Maysan
- 2017–2020: Iraq U23 (Assist.)
- 2020: Al-Shorta (Assist.)
- 2021: Al-Sinaat Al-Kahrabaiya
- 2021–2022: Iraq U-23 (Assist.)
- 2023–: Erbil
- * Club domestic league appearances and goals

Abbas Obeid (Arabic: عَبَّاس عُبَيْد جَاسِم; born December 10, 1973) is a former Iraqi football player. He played for Anyang LG Cheetahs and Pohang Steelers of the South Korean K League. He was also capped for the Iraq national football team.

Abbas played at the 2000 Asian Cup in Lebanon where his performances earned him a place in the Asian XI voted by the AFC.

== Career statistics ==
=== International goals ===
Scores and results list Iraq's goal tally first.

| No | Date | Venue | Opponent | Score | Result | Competition |
|---|---|---|---|---|---|---|
| 1. | 12 March 1995 | Salt Lake Stadium, Calcutta | India | 1–0 | 1–1 | 1995 Nehru Cup |
| 2. | 14 July 1995 | National Stadium, Kuala Lumpur | Malaysia | 1–0 | 2–1 | 1995 Merdeka Tournament |
| 3. | 14 July 1995 | National Stadium, Kuala Lumpur | Malaysia | 2–0 | 2–1 | 1995 Merdeka Tournament |
| 4. | 7 August 1999 | Central Stadium, Dushanbe | Kyrgyzstan | 4–1 | 5–1 | Friendly |
| 5. | 7 August 1999 | Central Stadium, Dushanbe | Kyrgyzstan | 5–1 | 5–1 | Friendly |
| 6. | 23 May 2000 | Amman International Stadium, Amman | Lebanon | 2–1 | 2–1 | 2000 WAFF |
| 7. | 24 October 2000 | Camille Chamoun Sports City Stadium, Beirut | Japan | 1–0 | 1–4 | 2000 AFC Asian Cup |

== Managerial statistics ==
As of match played 5 August 2023

Managerial record by team and tenure
| Team | From | To | Record | | | | | Ref. |
| Team | From | To | P | W | D | L | Win % | Ref. |
|---|---|---|---|---|---|---|---|---|
| Naft Maysan | 30 June 2015 | 7 November 2015 | 8 | 2 | 2 | 4 | 25.0 | |
| Al-Sinaat Al-Kahrabaiya | 25 January 2021 | 18 April 2021 | 16 | 5 | 5 | 6 | 31.3 | |
| Erbil | 10 March 2023 | present | 19 | 12 | 3 | 4 | 63.2 | |
| Total | | | 24 | 7 | 7 | 10 | 29.2 | — |
