= Janne Salli =

Finnish footballer (born 1977)

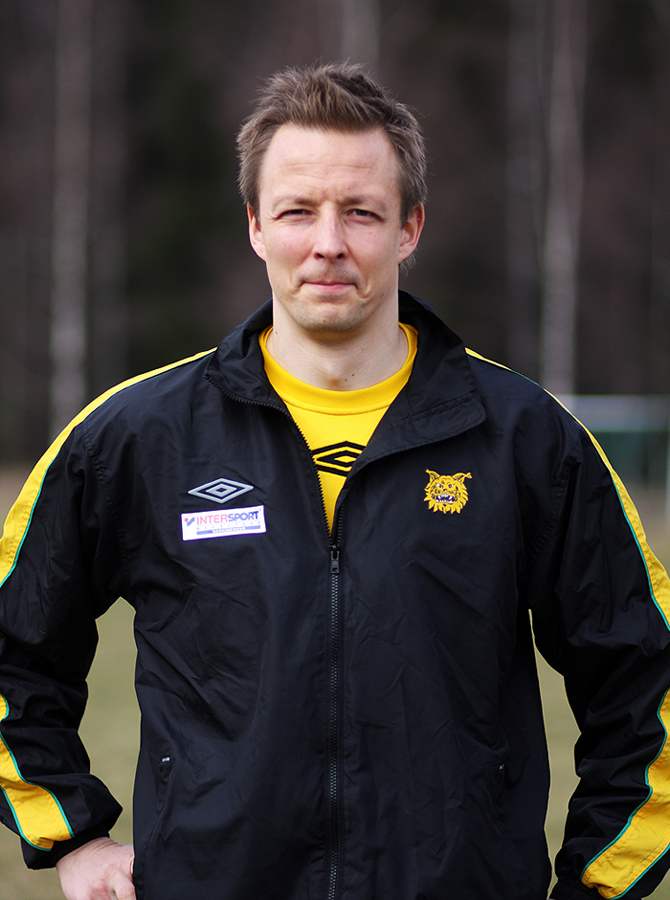
- Salli as a player/coach of Ilves in 2010

Personal information
- Full name: Janne Mikael Salli
- Date of birth: 14 December 1977 (age 48)
- Place of birth: Finland
- Position: Defender

Senior career*
Years	Team	Apps	(Gls)
1993–1997	TP-Seinäjoki	85	(5)
1998–2000	Haka	77	(7)
2000–2002	Barnsley	7	(0)
2003	TP-Seinäjoki	7	(1)
2003–2005	Haka	48	(1)
2006–2007	TPV	49	(3)
2008–2010	Ilves	57	(2)

International career
1999–2004	Finland	10	(1)
- * Club domestic league appearances and goals

Janne Salli (born 14 December 1977) is a Finnish retired footballer.

Salli captained the Finnish Under-21 team while playing for FC Haka.

Salli then moved to Barnsley in the English leagues, but suffered a knee injury against Leeds United which he could not recover from, and the English papers of the time reported he had retired at the age of 24.

== Career statistics ==
=== Club ===
As of 1 September 2024.

Appearances and goals by club, season and competition
Club	Season	League			Cup (Note: Includes Suomen Cup)		Europe		Total	
Club	Season	Division	Apps	Goals	Apps	Goals	Apps	Goals	Apps	Goals
TP-Seinäjoki	1994	Kakkonen	16	1	–		–		16	1
TP-Seinäjoki	1995	Kakkonen	18	2	–		–		18	2
TP-Seinäjoki	1996	Ykkönen	26	0	–		–		26	0
TP-Seinäjoki	1997	Veikkausliiga	25	2	–		–		25	2
TP-Seinäjoki	Total		85	5	0	0	0	0	85	5
Haka	1998	Veikkausliiga	22	3	–		4 (Note: Appearances in UEFA Cup Winners' Cup)	1	26	4
Haka	1999	Veikkausliiga	24	2	–		2 (Note: Appearances in UEFA Champions League)	1	26	3
Haka	2000	Veikkausliiga	31	2	–		4	0	35	2
Haka	Total		77	7	0	0	10	2	87	9
Barnsley	2000–01	First Division	7	0	1	0	–		8	0
Barnsley	2001–02	First Division	0	0	0	0	–		0	0
Barnsley	Total		7	0	1	0	0	0	8	0
TP-Seinäjoki	2003	Kakkonen	7	1	–		–		7	1
Haka	2003	Veikkausliiga	4	0	–		–		4	0
Haka	2004	Veikkausliiga	24	2	–		3 (Note: Appearances in UEFA Cup)	0	27	0
Haka	2005	Veikkausliiga	20	1	1	0	4	0	25	1
Haka	Total		48	3	1	0	7	0	56	3
TPV	2006	Kakkonen	27	4	–		–		27	4
TPV	2007	Ykkönen	24	0	–		–		24	0
TPV	Total		51	4	0	0	0	0	51	4
Ilves	2008	Kakkonen	21	0	–		–		21	0
Ilves	2009	Kakkonen	18	2	–		–		18	2
Ilves	2010	Kakkonen	18	0	–		–		18	0
Ilves	Total		57	2	0	0	0	0	57	2
Career total			292	22	2	0	17	2	301	24

=== International goals ===
As of match played 4 September 1999. Finland score listed first, score column indicates score after each Salli goal.

List of international goals scored by Janne Salli
No.	Date	Venue	Opponent	Score	Result	Competition
1	4 September 1999	Helsinki Olympic Stadium, Helsinki, Finland	Germany	1–2	1–2	UEFA Euro 2000 qualifying

== Honours ==
Haka

- Veikkausliiga: 1998, 1999, 2000, 2004
- Finnish Cup: 2005
