= Georgi Bachev =

Bulgarian footballer (born 1977)

Personal information
- Full name: Georgi Krumov Bachev
- Date of birth: 18 April 1977 (age 49)
- Place of birth: Blagoevgrad, Bulgaria
- Height: 1.76 m (5 ft 9 1/2 in)
- Positions: Left winger; forward

Senior career*
Years	Team	Apps	(Gls)
1993–1995	Pirin Blagoevgrad	32	(0)
1996–1999	Slavia Sofia	52	(12)
1999	→ Levski Sofia (loan)	11	(4)
1999–2002	Levski Sofia	38	(13)
2003–2004	Slavia Sofia	26	(4)
2004–2007	Vihren Sandanski	45	(24)
Total		206	(57)

International career
1997–1999	Bulgaria	16	(1)
- * Club domestic league appearances and goals

Georgi Krumov Bachev (Bulgarian: Георги Крумов Бачев; born 18 April 1977) is a former Bulgarian professional footballer who played as a winger or forward.

== Career ==
He played for a few clubs, including Slavia Sofia, Levski Sofia and Vihren Sandanski.

He played for the Bulgaria national football team and was a participant at the 1998 FIFA World Cup.

Bachev has managed Loko Mezdra.

== International goals ==
Scores and results list Bulgaria's goal tally first.

No	Date	Venue	Opponent	Score	Result	Competition
—	29 July 1995	Stadium Merdeka, Kuala Lumpur, Malaysia	Malaysia	2–0	2–0	Merdeka Tournament
1.	24 December 1998	Stade Al Inbiaâte, Agadir, Morocco	Morocco	1–2	1–4	Friendly match
