= Sergiu Epureanu =

Moldovan footballer

Personal information
- Date of birth: 12 September 1976 (age 50)
- Place of birth: Cantemir, Moldovan SSR, Soviet Union
- Height: 1.76 m (5 ft 9 in)
- Position: Midfielder

Senior career*
Years	Team	Apps	(Gls)
1992–1997	Agro Chișinău	103	(14)
1997–2002	Zimbru Chișinău	91	(19)
2000	→ Samsunspor (loan)	24	(2)
2000–2001	→ İstanbulspor (loan)	18	(0)
2002–2003	Sokol Saratov	40	(1)
2004–2006	Vorskla Poltava	50	(8)
2006–2007	Kryvbas Kryvyi Rih	15	(0)
2007–2009	Nistru Otachi	23	(6)
2009	Taraz	25	(7)
2010	Viitorul Orhei	14	(0)
2010	Academia UTM Chișinău	2	(0)
2010	Neman Grodno	4	(0)
2011–2013	Nistru Otaci	54	(5)
Total		463	(62)

International career
1996–2006	Moldova	47	(3)
- * Club domestic league appearances and goals

Sergiu Epureanu (born 12 September 1976) is a Moldovan former footballer.

== International career ==
Epureanu has made 46 appearances and has scored 3 goals for the Moldova national football team.

== International goals ==
Scores and results list Moldova's goal tally first.

No	Date	Venue	Opponent	Score	Result	Competition
1.	10 March 1999	Ta' Qali Stadium, Ta' Qali, Malta	Malta	1–0	2–0	Friendly match
2.	8 September 1999	Stadionul Republican, Chişinău, Moldova	Turkey	1–0	1–1	Euro 2000 qualifier
3.	16 August 2006	Stadionul Zimbru, Chişinău, Moldova	Lithuania	2–2	3–2	Friendly match
