= Valeriu Pogorelov =

Moldovan-Ukrainian footballer

Personal information
- Full name: Valeriu Ivanovich Pogorelov
- Date of birth: 25 June 1967 (age 59)
- Place of birth: Biliaivka, Ukrainian SSR, Soviet Union
- Height: 1.80 m (5 ft 11 in)
- Position: Defender

Youth career
- Sports School Bălți

Senior career*
Years	Team	Apps	(Gls)
1985	Atlantyka Sevastopol	31	(0)
1986–1988	SKChF Sevastopol		
1989–1991	Tavriya Simferopol	92	(10)
1992–1997	Tiligul Tiraspol	135	(18)
1997–1999	Chornomorets Odesa	50	(1)
1999	Tiligul Tiraspol	2	(1)
1999–2000	Constructorul Chisinau	36	(1)
2001–2003	Agro Chișinău	49	(0)
Total		395+	(31+)

International career
1994–1998	Moldova	11	(1)
- * Club domestic league appearances and goals

Valeriu Ivanovich Pogorelov (Ukrainian: Валерій Іванович Погорєлов, Russian: Валерий Иванович Погорелов; born 25 June 1967) is a Moldovan former footballer who played as a defender and made eleven appearances for the Moldova national team. He also holds Ukrainian citizenship.

== Career ==
Pogorelov made his debut for Moldova on 16 April 1994 in a friendly match against the United States, which finished as a 1–1 draw. He went on to make eleven appearances, scoring one goal – a spectacular solo effort against Wales in a Euro 96 qualifier in October 1994 – before making his last appearance on 22 April 1998 in a friendly match against Azerbaijan, which finished as a 0–1 loss.

== Career statistics ==
=== International ===
Moldova
Year	Apps	Goals
1994	7	1
1995	3	0
1998	1	0
Total	11	1

=== International goals ===
No.	Date	Venue	Opponent	Score	Result	Competition
1	12 October 1994	Stadionul Republican, Chișinău, Moldova	Wales	3–2	3–2	UEFA Euro 1996 qualifying
