= Ion Testemițanu =

Moldovan footballer and manager

Ion Testimiţanu
Personal information
- Date of birth: 27 April 1974 (age 52)
- Place of birth: Chişinău, Moldavian SSR, Soviet Union
- Position: Defender

Senior career*
Years	Team	Apps	(Gls)
1991–1998	Zimbru Chişinău	190	(31)
1998–2001	Bristol City	35	(2)
2001	Seongnam Ilhwa Chunma	22	(2)
2002	Ulsan Hyundai Horang-i	0	(0)
2002–2004	Sheriff Tiraspol	36	(4)
2004	Seongnam Ilhwa Chunma	15	(1)
2004–2005	Sheriff Tiraspol	11	(3)
2005	Chkalovets-1936 Novosibirsk	15	(0)
2005–2006	Sheriff Tiraspol	3	(0)
2006	Sibir Novosibirsk	27	(0)
2007	Terek Grozny	38	(0)
2007–2009	Sheriff Tiraspol	10	(0)
2009–2010	Inter Baku	15	(1)

International career
1991–2006	Moldova	56	(5)
- * Club domestic league appearances and goals

Ion Testemiţanu (born 27 April 1974) is a Moldovan former footballer.

He was signed by Benny Lennartson at Bristol City in 1998 and also played under Tony Pulis in 1999. He credits the Welsh manager with helping him settle in the United Kingdom. Testimiţanu played 4 games for Moldova in UEFA Euro 2008 qualifying.

He is featured in Tony Hawks' book, Playing the Moldovans at Tennis, where he lost to the author 11–4.

== International goals ==
Scores and results list Moldova's goal tally first.

No	Date	Venue	Opponent	Score	Result	Competition
1.	15 November 1995	Stadionul Republican, Chişinău, Moldova	Georgia	1–0	3–2	Euro 1996 qualifier
2.	9 April 1996	Stadionul Republican, Chişinău, Moldova	Ukraine	1–2	2–2	Friendly match
3.	1 June 1996	Stadionul Steaua	Romania	1–3	1–3	Friendly match
4.	18 November 1998	Windsor Park, Belfast, Northern Ireland	Northern Ireland	2–1	2–2	Euro 2000 qualifier
5.	6 February 2000	GSZ Stadium, Larnaca, Cyprus	Slovakia	1–0	2–0	Cyprus International Tournament
