= Merdeka Tournament =

International football tournament in Malaysia

Merdeka Football Tournament
- Organiser(s): FAM
- Founded: 1957; 69 years ago
- Region: International
- Teams: Varied (4 in 2024)
- Current champions: Malaysia (13th title)
- Most championships: Malaysia (13 titles)
- 2024 Merdeka Tournament

Merdeka Tournament (Malay: Pestabola Merdeka) is an international friendly football tournament held in Malaysia to commemorate the Independence Day. It is mainly played at Independence Stadium, in Kuala Lumpur. "Merdeka" is the Malay word (borrowed from Sanskrit) for independence or freedom. As of 2024, the tournament has been held 43 times, though with decreasing frequency in recent decades.

The Merdeka Tournament is the oldest invitational football tournament in Asia, and the matches in the tournament are considered International "A" matches (Friendly match) by FIFA.

== History ==
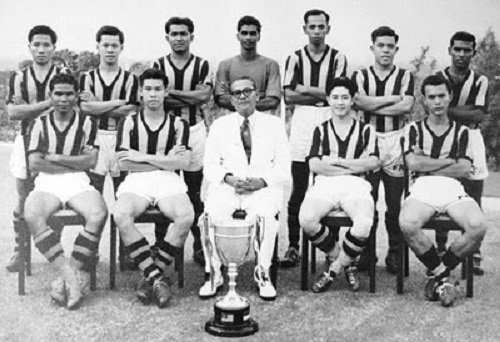
The winner of the second season of Merdeka Cup in 1958, Malaya football team, five years before the merger to form Malaysia. Also in the picture is Tunku Abdul Rahman (centre), the first Prime Minister of Malaya, and at that time president of Football Association of Malaya & Asian Football Confederation.

The Merdeka Tournament is Asia`s oldest football tournament which invited football playing nations to compete since 1957. The tournament also was once called the ‘Mini Asia Cup’ around the 1960s to 1980s, which was founded by the former AFC President, Tunku Abdul Rahman. At that time, the FIFA president, Sir Stanley Rous, was just as surprised that newly independent Asian country could successfully organize a football tournament where all expenses of the visiting teams were fully borne by the host. The Merdeka Tournament proved to be a huge success, inspiring similar tournaments like the Jakarta Anniversary Tournament in Indonesia, the King's Cup in Thailand and the President's Cup in South Korea. While the tournament had been held annually from 1957 to 1988, it has been held only ten times from 1989 to 2023. During the late 1950s to early 1980s, it was a prestigious tournament among Asian nations because the participants sent their full senior players. After the 1980s, interest in the cup waned from both football fans and football teams, because many Asian nations focused more on the qualification phases in the FIFA World Cup and AFC Asian Cup.

The first edition of the tournament was held in August and September 1957 with British Hong Kong emerging inaugural champions. However, from then on it was purely dominated by Malaysia, South Korea, Myanmar, Indonesia and a host of other countries, including South American and European clubs.

Malaysia/Malaya exclusively lifted the trophy ten times, emerged runners-up on eight occasions, and in addition shared the winner’s rostrum twice with South Korea (1960 and 1979), while South Korean sides have won it seven times.

Indonesia, Taiwan and Myanmar hold multi-winning accolades. The other champions were Morocco (1980), New Zealand (2000), Uzbekistan (2001), Czechoslovakia Olympic (1987) and Austria’s with their SK Admira Wacker (1991), German Hamburger SV (1988), Argentinian Buenos Aires XI (1983) and Brazilian Santa Catarina XI (1982).

Brazilian states' São Paulo XI, Minas Gerais XI, and America FC Rio de Janeiro finished runners-up, as have Japan and India.

The 2024 Merdeka Tournament would be held in September 2024. Three countries will be invited to the tournament, from Kim Pan-gon's decision. The tournament uses the same format as the 2023 edition, where higher-ranked teams received a bye in the semi-final, and only waiting in the finals.

== List of finals ==
Merdeka Tournament logo in 2013.

Below are the list of Merdeka Football Tournament finals since 1957.

| Ed. | Year | Winners | Score | Runners-up |
|---|---|---|---|---|
| 1 | 1957 | Hong Kong League XI (Note: Hong Kong sent its team that consisted of players that represented Republic of China (Taiwan) or Hong Kong from 1957 to 1961. From 1963 to 1968, the team officially represented Republic of China (Taiwan) but was composed of Hong Kong-based Republic of China international footballers; From 1965 onwards, Hong Kong and Taiwan's national teams also participated.) | Round-robin | Indonesia |
| 2 | 1958 | Malaya | Round-robin | Hong Kong League XI |
| 3 | 1959 | Malaya | Round-robin | India |
| 4 | 1960 | Malaya and South Korea | 0–0 (Note: Title was shared after match finished in a draw) | — |
| 5 | 1961 | Indonesia | 2–1 | Malaya |
| 6 | 1962 | Indonesia | 2–1 | Pakistan |
| 7 | 1963 | Taiwan | Round-robin | Japan |
| 8 | 1964 | Burma | 1–0 | India |
| 9 | 1965 | South Korea and Taiwan | 1–1 | — |
| 10 | 1966 | South Vietnam | 1–0 | Burma |
| 11 | 1967 | Burma and South Korea (Note: Represented by Yangzee FC) | 0–0 | — |
| 12 | 1968 | Malaysia | 3–0 | Burma |
| 13 | 1969 | Indonesia | 3–2 | Malaysia |
| 14 | 1970 | South Korea | 1–0 | Burma |
| 15 | 1971 | Burma | 1–0 | Indonesia |
| 16 | 1972 | South Korea | 2–1 | Malaysia |
| 17 | 1973 | Malaysia | 3–1 | Kuwait |
| 18 | 1974 | Malaysia | 1–0 | South Korea B |
| 19 | 1975 | South Korea | 1–0 | Malaysia |
| 20 | 1976 | Malaysia | 2–0 | Japan |
| 21 | 1977 | South Korea | 1–0 | Iraq |
| 22 | 1978 | South Korea | 2–0 | Iraq |
| 23 | 1979 | Malaysia and South Korea | 0–0 | — |
| 24 | 1980 | Morocco | 2–1 | Malaysia |
| 25 | 1981 | Iraq | 1–0 | (Brazil) São Paulo XI |
| 26 | 1982 | (Brazil) Santa Catarina XI | 3–0 | Ghana |
| 27 | 1983 | (Argentina) Buenos Aires XI | 2–1 | Algeria XI |
| 28 | 1984 | South Korea B | 2–0 | (Brazil) Minas Gerais XI |
| 29 | 1985 | South Korea B | 7–4 (a.e.t.) | (Brazil) America Rio de Janeiro |
| 30 | 1986 | Malaysia | 3–0 | Czechoslovakia XI |
| 31 | 1987 | Czechoslovakia Olympic | 3–2 | South Korea |
| 32 | 1988 | (West Germany) Hamburger SV | 1–0 | (Austria) Tirol Innsbruck |
| 33 | 1991 | (Austria) Admira Wacker | 3–0 | China Olympic Team |
| 34 | 1993 | Malaysia | 3–1 | South Korea |
| 35 | 1995 | Iraq | 2–0 | (Hungary) Budapesti Vasas |
| 36 | 2000 | New Zealand | 2–0 | Malaysia |
| 37 | 2001 | Uzbekistan | 2–1 | Bosnia and Herzegovina |
| 38 | 2006 | Myanmar | 2–1 | Indonesia |
| 39 | 2007 | Malaysia U-23 | 3–1 | Myanmar |
| 40 | 2008 | Vietnam U-22 | 0–0 (6–5 (p)) | Malaysia |
| 41 | 2013 | Malaysia U-23 | 2–0 | Myanmar U-23 |
| 42 | 2023 | Tajikistan | 2–0 | Malaysia |
| 43 | 2024 | Malaysia | 1–0 | Lebanon |

== Records and statistics ==
=== Performance by nations ===
Below are the records of national teams (including youth teams) since 1957.

| # | Team | (gold) Titles | (silver) Runners-up | Total |
|---|---|---|---|---|
| 1 | Malaysia (Note: includes results representing Malaya and Malaysia national under-23 football team) | 13 (Note: Includes two shared titles.) | 8 | 21 |
| 2 | South Korea (Note: includes results representing South Korea B and South Korea U-23) | 11 (Note: Includes four shared titles.) | 3 | 14 |
| 3 | Myanmar (Note: includes results representing Burma and Myanmar national under-22 football team) | 4 (Note: Include one shared title.) | 5 | 9 |
| 4 | Indonesia | 3 | 3 | 6 |
| 5 | Iraq | 2 | 2 | 4 |
| 6 | Taiwan | 2 | 0 | 2 |
| 6 | Vietnam (Note: includes results representing South Vietnam and the Vietnam national under-23 football team) | 2 | 0 | 2 |
| 8 | Hong Kong League XI | 1 | 1 | 2 |
| 8 | Czechoslovakia (Note: includes results representing Czechoslovakia Olympic football team) | 1 | 1 | 2 |
| 10 | Morocco | 1 | 0 | 1 |
| 10 | New Zealand | 1 | 0 | 1 |
| 10 | Uzbekistan | 1 | 0 | 1 |
| 10 | Tajikistan | 1 | 0 | 1 |
| 14 | India | 0 | 2 | 2 |
| 14 | Japan | 0 | 2 | 2 |
| 16 | Pakistan | 0 | 1 | 1 |
| 16 | Kuwait | 0 | 1 | 1 |
| 16 | Ghana | 0 | 1 | 1 |
| 16 | Algeria XI | 0 | 1 | 1 |
| 16 | China Olympic Team | 0 | 1 | 1 |
| 16 | Bosnia and Herzegovina | 0 | 1 | 1 |
| 16 | Lebanon | 0 | 1 | 1 |

=== Performance by state or club teams ===
Below are the records of state or clubteams since 1957.

| # | Team | (gold) Titles | (silver) Runners-up | Total |
|---|---|---|---|---|
| 1 | (Brazil) Santa Catarina XI | 1 | 0 | 1 |
| 1 | (Argentina) Buenos Aires XI | 1 | 0 | 1 |
| 1 | (West Germany) Hamburger SV | 1 | 0 | 1 |
| 1 | (Austria) SK Admira Wacker | 1 | 0 | 1 |
| 5 | (Brazil) São Paulo XI | 0 | 1 | 1 |
| 5 | (Brazil) Minas Gerais XI | 0 | 1 | 1 |
| 5 | (Brazil) America Rio de Janeiro | 0 | 1 | 1 |
| 5 | (Austria) Tirol Innsbruck | 0 | 1 | 1 |
| 5 | (Hungary) Budapesti Vasas | 0 | 1 | 1 |

=== All-time top scorers ===
| # | Player | Team | Matches | Goals | Ratio | Ref. |
|---|---|---|---|---|---|---|
| 1 | Mokhtar Dahari | Malaysia | 50 | 36 | 0.72 | |
| 2 | Kunishige Kamamoto | Japan | 18 | 22 | 1.22 | |
| 3 | Abdul Kadir | Indonesia | 36 | 22 | 0.61 | |
| 4 | Cha Bum-kun | South Korea | 34 | 21 | 0.62 | |
| 5 | Abdul Ghani Minhat | Malaysia | 32 | 19 | 0.60 | |

=== Top scorers ===
| Year | Player | Team | Goals |
|---|---|---|---|
| 1980 | Hamid Khourrag | Morocco | 6 |
| 1986 | Krishanu Dey Zainal Abidin Hassan | India Malaysia | 6 |
| 1987 | Václav Daněk | Czechoslovakia Olympic | 6 |
| 1988 | Peter Pacult | (Austria) Tirol Innsbruck | 5 |
| 1991 | Ernst Ogris | (Austria) SK Admira Wacker | 4 |
| 1993 | Petar Aleksandrov | (Switzerland) Aarau | 4 |
| 1995 | Lee Woo-young | South Korea B | 3 |
| 2000 | Chris Killen | New Zealand | 3 |
| 2001 | Bakhtiyor Hamidullaev Husain Ali | Uzbekistan Bahrain | 3 |
| 2006 | Indra Putra Mahayuddin | Malaysia | 3 |
| 2007 | Safee Sali | Malaysia U-23 | 4 |
| 2008 | Safee Sali (2) | Malaysia | 5 |
| 2013 | Rozaimi Rahman | Malaysia U-23 | 3 |
| 2023 | 8 players | India Malaysia Tajikistan | 1 |
| 2024 | 5 players | Lebanon Malaysia Philippines | 1 |
