= 1995 Merdeka Tournament =

Tournament details
- Host country: Malaysia
- Teams: 6 (from 2 confederations)
- Venue: 1 (in 1 host city)

Final positions
- Champions: Iraq (2nd title)
- Runners-up: (Hungary) Vasas SC

Tournament statistics
- Matches played: 9
- Goals scored: 20 (2.22 per match)

The 1995 Merdeka Tournament was held from 17 July to 2 August 1995 in Malaysia.

== Group stage ==
=== Group A ===
Pos	Team	Pld	W	D	L	GF	GA	GD	Pts	
1	Iraq	2	1	1	0	4	3	+1	4	Semifinal
2	Malaysia	2	1	0	1	3	3	0	3	Semifinal
3	South Korea U-23	2	0	1	1	3	4	−1	1	

Updated to match(es) played on unknown. Source:
17 July 1995

Malaysia	2–1	South Korea U-23
	Report

Merdeka Stadium, Kuala Lumpur
Attendance: 15,000

19 July 1995

South Korea U-23	2–2	Iraq
Woo-young 35', 50'	Report	Obeid 61'; Saadoun 63'

Merdeka Stadium, Kuala Lumpur
Attendance: 10,000

21 July 1995

Malaysia	1–2	Iraq
Bakar 89'	Report	Obeid 11', 61'

Merdeka Stadium, Kuala Lumpur

=== Group B ===
Pos	Team	Pld	W	D	L	GF	GA	GD	Pts	
1	(Hungary) Vasas SC	2	1	1	0	3	2	+1	3	Semifinal
2	Bulgaria XI	2	0	2	0	0	0	0	2	Semifinal
3	Uzbekistan	2	0	1	1	2	3	−1	1	

Updated to match(es) played on unknown. Source:
18 July 1995

Vasas SC (Hungary)	3–2	Uzbekistan
	Report

Merdeka Stadium, Kuala Lumpur
Attendance: 12,000

20 July 1995

Bulgaria XI	0–0	Uzbekistan
	Report

Merdeka Stadium, Kuala Lumpur
Attendance: 7,500

22 July 1995

Bulgaria XI	0–0	(Hungary) Vasas SC
	Report

Merdeka Stadium, Kuala Lumpur
Attendance: 8,000

== Knockout stage ==
Semifinals
25 July – Kuala Lumpur
Iraq	1
Bulgaria XI	0
26 July – Kuala Lumpur
Malaysia	0
(Hungary) Vasas SC	2

Final
2 August – Kuala Lumpur
Iraq	2
(Hungary) Vasas SC	0

=== Semifinals ===
25 July 1995

Iraq	1–0	Bulgaria XI
Fawzi 69'	Report

Merdeka Stadium, Kuala Lumpur
Attendance: 12,000
26 July 1995

Malaysia	0–2	(Hungary) Vasas SC
	Report

Merdeka Stadium, Kuala Lumpur
Attendance: 22,000

=== Final ===
2 August 1995

Iraq	2–0	(Hungary) Vasas SC
Mohammed 65'; Chathir 70'	Report

Merdeka Stadium, Kuala Lumpur
Attendance: 18,000
