= Tayfur Havutçu =

Turkish footballer and manager

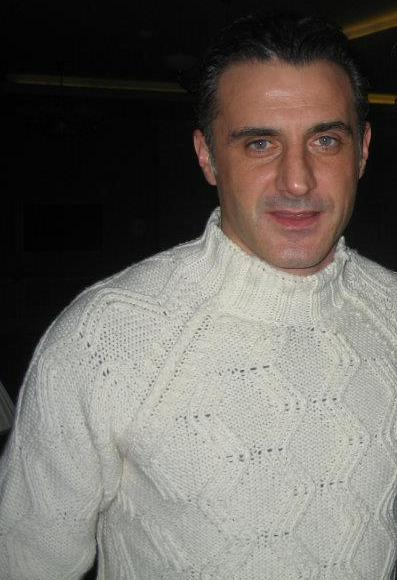
- Havutçu in 2012

Personal information
- Full name: Tayfur Havutçu Marshan
- Date of birth: 23 April 1970 (age 56)
- Place of birth: Hanau, West Germany
- Height: 1.80 m (5 ft 11 in)
- Position: Defensive midfielder

Youth career
- –1990: SG Egelsbach
- 1990–1992: Darmstadt 98

Senior career*
| Years | Team | Apps | (Gls) |
| 1992–1993 | Darmstadt 98 | 35 | (2) |
| 1993–1995 | Fenerbahçe | 53 | (2) |
| 1995–1997 | Kocaelispor | 65 | (2) |
| 1997–2006 | Beşiktaş | 245 | (7) |
| Total | | 366 | (13) |

International career
| 1994–2004 | Turkey | 44 | (6) |

Managerial career
- 2006–2007: Beşiktaş (assistant)
- 2007: Beşiktaş (caretaker)
- 2008–2011: Beşiktaş (assistant)
- 2011: Beşiktaş
- 2012: Beşiktaş
- 2016: Adana Demirspor
- 2017–2019: Turkey (assistant)
- 2019–2020: Kasımpaşa
Medal record
Representing Turkey
Men's football
FIFA World Cup
| Third place | 2002 Korea/Japan |
- * Club domestic league appearances and goals

Tayfur Havutçu (born 23 April 1970) is a Turkish football manager and former professional player who was most recently the manager of Süper Lig club Kasımpaşa. He was part of the Turkey national team squad that reached third place at the 2002 FIFA World Cup.

== Club career ==
Havutçu began his football career in Germany, playing for SG Egelsbach before joining SV Darmstadt 98. During the 1992–93 season, he made 35 league appearances for Darmstadt 98, scoring two goals. In 1993, he moved to Turkey to join Fenerbahçe, where he spent two seasons, making 53 appearances and scoring two goals.

In 1995, Havutçu joined Kocaelispor, where he spent two seasons before moving to Beşiktaş in 1997. At Beşiktaş, he played as a defensive midfielder, contributing to the team's defensive organisation and build-up play. His consistent performances eventually led to his appointment as club captain.

During his time at Beşiktaş, Havutçu won the Süper Lig title in the 2002–03 season. The achievement came during the club's centenary season. He also won domestic competitions, including the Turkish Cup and the Turkish Super Cup. During the 2004–05 season, he contributed to the team while also taking on a role within the club's management. In 2003, he agreed to a two-year contract extension with Beşiktaş.

Havutçu retired from professional football in July 2006, following a friendly match between Beşiktaş and Shakhtar Donetsk. Having served as captain for an extended period, he had established himself as one of the club's prominent players.

== International career ==
Havutçu made his debut for the Turkey national team in 1994, playing as a defensive midfielder. He participated in the 1998 FIFA World Cup qualification, although Turkey failed to qualify for the tournament. He subsequently played an important role in the UEFA Euro 2000 qualifiers, scoring five goals during the qualifying campaign. Turkey secured qualification for the tournament by defeating the Republic of Ireland in the play-offs.

Havutçu also participated in the UEFA European Championship 2000. Although he did not feature in the group-stage match against Sweden, he played against Belgium and also appeared in the quarter-final against Portugal. Turkey lost 2–0 to Portugal, failing to reach the semi-finals, but achieved its first-ever quarter-final appearance at the European Championship.

At the 2002 FIFA World Cup, Havutçu was part of the Turkey national team squad. Turkey was drawn in Group C alongside Brazil, Costa Rica and China. After progressing from the group stage, Turkey defeated Japan and Senegal in succession in the knockout stage. Although they lost to Brazil in the semi-finals, they defeated South Korea 3–2 in the third-place play-off to finish third. Havutçu was included in the matchday squad for three matches at the tournament and made substitute appearances in some of them.

Havutçu represented Turkey from 1994 to 2004, making 44 appearances and scoring six goals for the national team.

== Managerial career ==
After retiring from professional football in 2006, Havutçu undertook coaching training and began his managerial career in 2007, joining the coaching staff of Beşiktaş. He subsequently worked as an assistant to several managers at the club. In March 2011, following the resignation of manager Bernd Schuster, he was initially appointed as caretaker manager before being named permanent manager. He led Beşiktaş to victory in the Turkish Cup during the 2010–11 season.

Later in 2011, he moved to the position of sporting director at Beşiktaş. In April 2012, he was reappointed as manager, leading the team until the end of the season. In March 2016, he took charge of Adana Demirspor, but left the club in April of the same year. He had therefore served as both a coach and manager at Beşiktaş, as well as manager of Adana Demirspor.

From 2017 to 2019, Havutçu served as an assistant coach of the Turkey national team, working under managers Mircea Lucescu and Şenol Güneş. In December 2019, he was appointed manager of Kasımpaşa, signing an 18-month contract. However, he left the club in January 2020.

=== Managerial statistics ===
As of 2 April 2011

| Team | From | To | Record | | | | |
| Team | From | To | G | W | D | L | Win % |
|---|---|---|---|---|---|---|---|
| Beşiktaş | 19 May 2007 | 25 May 2007 | 2 | 1 | 0 | 1 | 50.00 |
| Beşiktaş | 19 March 2011 | 3 August 2011 | 12 | 6 | 5 | 1 | 50.00 |
| Beşiktaş | 2 April 2012 | 20 May 2012 | 7 | 1 | 3 | 3 | 14.29 |
| Total | | | 21 | 8 | 8 | 5 | 38.10 |

== Honours ==
Kocaelispor

- Turkish Cup: 1997

Beşiktaş

- Süper Lig: 2002–03
- Turkish Cup: 1998, 2006
- Turkish Super Cup: 1998

Turkey

- FIFA World Cup: third place 2002
- FIFA Confederations Cup: third place 2003

Order

- Turkish State Medal of Distinguished Service
