= Igor Oprea =

Moldovan footballer (born 1969)

Personal information
- Date of birth: 5 October 1969 (age 57)
- Place of birth: Cojușna, Moldavian SSR, Soviet Union
- Height: 1.79 m (5 ft 10 in)
- Position: Midfielder

Team information
- Current team: Zimbru Chişinău (chairman)

Senior career*
Years	Team	Apps	(Gls)
1988	Zarya Beltsy	11	(0)
1991–1996	Tiligul Tiraspol	121	(20)
1996–2002	Zimbru Chişinău	125	(11)
2002–2003	Chornomorets Odesa	29	(1)
2003–2004	Zimbru Chișinău	13	(0)

International career
1992–2001	Moldova	44	(4)

Managerial career
- 2009–2011: Viitorul Orhei
- 2011–2012: Zimbru Chişinău
- * Club domestic league appearances and goals

Igor Oprea (born 5 October 1969) is a Moldovan former professional footballer who played as a midfielder.

== Playing career ==
Oprea spent most of his career playing for Zimbru Chișinău, winning the Moldovan championship four times and the cup once with the club.

Oprea made 44 appearances for the Moldova national team from 1992 to 2001.

== Managerial career ==
After he retired from playing, Oprea began working with the Moldova national youth teams, and became a football manager. He led FC Viitorul Orhei in 2009 and 2010.

== Career statistics ==
Scores and results list Moldova's goal tally first.

No	Date	Venue	Opponent	Score	Result	Competition
1.	20 August 1992	Amman International Stadium, Amman, Jordan	Sudan	2–1	2–1	Friendly match
2.	7 September 1994	Boris Paichadze Stadium, Tbilisi, Georgia	Georgia	1–0	1–0	Euro 1996 qualifier
3	5 September 1998	Olympic Stadium, Helsinki, Finland	Finland	1–1	2–3	Euro 2000 qualifier
4	5 September 1998	Olympic Stadium, Helsinki, Finland	Finland	2–1	2–3	Euro 2000 qualifier
