= Vitali Culibaba =

Moldovan footballer and manager

Vitalie Culibaba
Personal information
- Date of birth: 26 January 1971 (age 55)
- Place of birth: Chișinău, Moldavian SSR, Soviet Union
- Position: Defender

Senior career*
Years	Team	Apps	(Gls)
1989–1990	Tiras Tiraspol		
1992–1998	Zimbru Chișinău		
1998	Tiligul Tiraspol		
1998–1999	Moldova-Gaz Chișinău		
1999–2000	Agro Chișinău		
2002–2003	Politehnica Chișinău		

International career
1995–1997	Moldova	15	(0)

Managerial career
- 2018–2019: Moldova U21
- 2019: Sevan
- 2021–2025: Moldova (assistant)
- * Club domestic league appearances and goals

Vitalie Culibaba (born 26 January 1971) is a retired Moldovan football defender and manager.
