= Serghei Belous =

Moldovan association football player

Personal information
- Full name: Serghei Belous
- Date of birth: 21 November 1971 (age 54)
- Place of birth: Chișinău, Moldavian SSR, Soviet Union
- Height: 1.84 m (6 ft 0 in)
- Position: Midfielder

Team information
- Current team: Academy Torpedo Moscow

Youth career
- SDYuShOR-4 Tiraspol

Senior career*
Years	Team	Apps	(Gls)
1988–1989	Tekstilshchik Tiraspol	24	(0)
1990	Dinamo Moscow	0	(0)
1991	Dinamo Sukhumi	30	(1)
1992	Gekris Novorossiysk	13	(0)
1992–2002	Tiligul Tiraspol	180	(35)
2003	Agro Chișinău	21	(2)
2004	Sheriff Tiraspol	13	(0)
2004–2005	Tiraspol	20	(0)

International career
1994–1999	Moldova	25	(1)

Managerial career
- 2005–2008: Academy Sheriff Tiraspol
- 2006–2008: Moldova U17 (assistant)
- 2006–2008: Sheriff-2 Tiraspol
- 2009–2013: KDYuSSh Krasnoyarsk Krai
- 2010–2013: TEKS Ivanteyevka
- 2013–2014: DYuSSh Strogino Moscow
- 2014–2023: FShM Moscow
- 2023–2024: Academy Torpedo Moscow
- 2025: Torpedo Moscow U21
- 2025–: Academy Torpedo Moscow
- * Club domestic league appearances and goals

Serghei Belous (born 21 November 1971) is a former Moldovan footballer, who played as midfielder.

== International goals ==
International goals of Serghei Belous
#	Date	Location	Opponent	Score	Result	Competition
1	12 October 1994	Chișinău, Republica Moldova	Wales	1-1	3–2	UEFA Euro 1996 qualifying

== Honours ==
Tiligul-Tiras Tiraspol

- Moldovan Cup (3): 1993, 1994, 1995

Sheriff Tiraspol

- Divizia Națională (1): 2003–04
