= Yordan Letchkov =

Bulgarian footballer (born 1967)

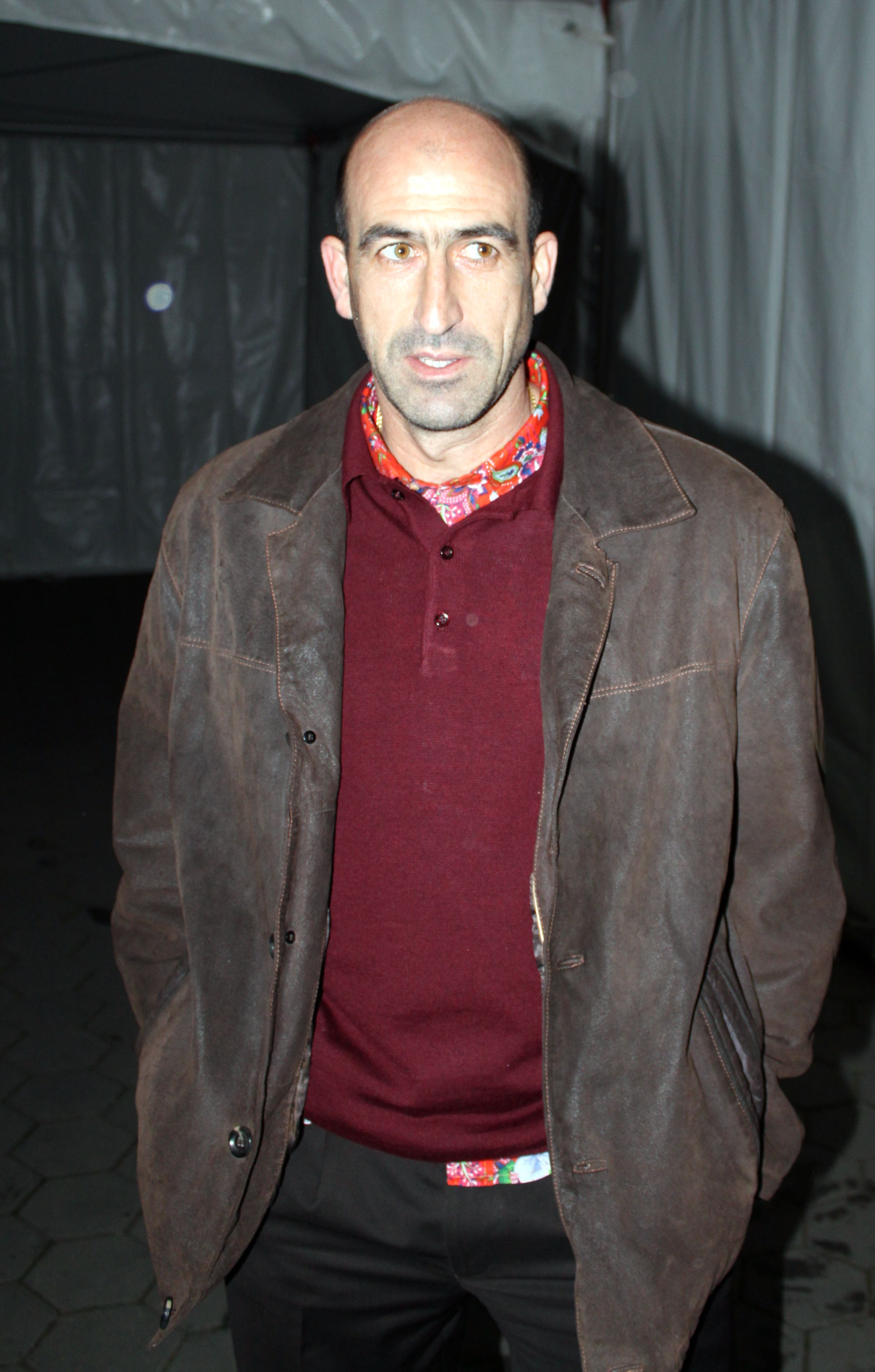
- Letchkov in 2010

Personal information
- Full name: Yordan Letchkov Yankov
- Date of birth: 9 July 1967 (age 59)
- Place of birth: Straldzha, Bulgaria
- Height: 1.78 m (5 ft 10 in)
- Position: Midfielder

Senior career*
Years	Team	Apps	(Gls)
1984–1991	Sliven	155	(55)
1991–1992	CSKA Sofia	29	(17)
1992–1996	Hamburger SV	121	(14)
1996–1997	Marseille	28	(2)
1997–1998	Beşiktaş	27	(4)
2001–2002	CSKA Sofia	25	(5)
2002–2004	Sliven	21	(4)
Total		406	(101)

International career
1989–1998	Bulgaria	45	(5)
- * Club domestic league appearances and goals

Yordan Letchkov Yankov (also transliterated Jordan, Iordan, Lechkov) (Bulgarian: Йордан Лечков Янков; born 9 July 1967) is a Bulgarian former professional footballer. He is generally regarded as one of the best players to come out of Bulgaria and was a key member of the squad which reached the semi-finals of the 1994 FIFA World Cup. Known to many as "The Magician", Letchkov was a gifted player who could play as a central midfielder or on the left side of midfield, and he was easily recognizable for his baldness. He was best known for his dribbling ability. However, his career was often adversely affected by his moody nature and the numerous arguments and fallings-out he had with fellow players and managers. He was the mayor of his home town for eight years, but was removed from duty due to corruption.

== Club career ==
Born in Straldzha, Letchkov began his career as a youngster with Sliven football club (Bulgaria), after breaking into the first team at a young age he secured a transfer to Bulgaria's top side CSKA Sofia (Bulgaria, 1991–92 season) and soon after he made the move to Germany with Hamburger SV (Germany, from the 1992–93 season to the 1995–96 season). After that he secured a move to Olympique de Marseille (France, 1996–97 season), at this point one of the top clubs in Europe. However a difficult relationship with the club's management led to his departure after one season.

His next stop took him to Turkey with Beşiktaş (Turkey, from the 1997–98 season). However, just after six months with the club, he returned late from holidays and fell into a dispute with the manager John Toshack. After being fined by the club, he refused to pay, stated that he has quit football and subsequently returned to Bulgaria. He has been variously quoted since as saying the Istanbul club owes him money, that he was unable to get on with its coach Toshack and that his wife could not settle in Turkey. However he soon started training with a Bulgarian club. Beşiktaş appealed to FIFA which declared Letchkov in breach of contract and ordered him to pay 200.000 DM in compensation. Beşiktaş renewed its appeals to UEFA and FIFA when Letchkov turned out without club permission for Bulgaria in a friendly against Argentina. FIFA subsequently ruled that Letchkov was ineligible to play for any other team without clearance from Beşiktaş, and that included his national side. Despite helping Bulgaria to reach 1998 World Cup, he could not play due to his dispute with Beşiktaş.

After about three years away from football, Letchkov returned to the game in the 2001–02 season with CSKA Sofia. Between 2002 and 2004 he became player-coach of OFC Sliven, a club in the second division of Bulgarian football. Letchkov is often referred to as being part of the "Golden Generation" of Bulgarian football, who along with Stoichkov, Kostadinov and Balakov led the national side to the semifinals of the 1994 World Cup.

== International career ==
Letchkov played 45 matches and scored five goals for Bulgaria; however his international career was limited by a series of disagreements with coaches and the Bulgarian Football Federation.

He is best remembered for scoring the winner against Germany in the quarter-finals of the 1994 World Cup, as Bulgaria reached the semi-finals where they were beaten by Italy. Because of his matches, he was placed in the 13th position of the 1994 Ballon d'Or.

Letchkov went on to compete in the 1996 European Championships in England despite the failure of Bulgaria to reach the quarter finals, playing against Spain and Romania and producing a man-of-the-match performance in the group B last match against the French side. He went on to contribute to Bulgaria's qualification campaign for the 1998 World Cup championships. However, his chance to play in the tournament was blocked by FIFA due to a contractual dispute with Beşiktaş (see also above in "Club").

== Post-football ==
Letchkov took part in a TV series called Golden Boots in 1998 with various other footballers, and in 2012 in the sport documentary called Stoichkov. After his retirement from football he has started a career as a businessman (owning luxury hotels and a football academy) and politician. He was elected Mayor of his home town, Sliven, in 2003 and was reelected in 2007.

Since 2005, he has also been vice president of the Bulgarian Football Union. In April 2010 he was removed from the mayorship by the Sliven district court after he was charged with official misconduct, but the Burgas appellate court restored him to his position on 28 June 2010. Letchkov was replaced by the new mayor of Sliven Kolyo Milev in the 2011 local elections, who outran him with 56,72% vs. 43,28% of the votes. Many citizens stated that they had voted for a member of the opposing party to the ones they support only to remove Letchkov from his post. Many of the major boulevards in the city were left dug up and in deep pot-holes for nearly two years due to "controversy" and a lawsuit between the company working on restructuring the city's water supply and the city council. In contrast, while he was still mayor, the streets that lead to Letchkov's hotels in the city were reconstructed and refreshed with the addition of gardens and aesthetic sidewalks and street lighting. Other scandals constantly accompanied him during his time as mayor, including the disrespecting of journalists and police officers (showing the middle finger) because he was wanted by the police after fleeing from a traffic stop after throwing his documents at them.

== Career statistics ==
=== International ===
Appearances and goals by national team and year
National team	Year	Apps	Goals
Bulgaria	1989	1	0
Bulgaria	1990	2	0
Bulgaria	1991	3	0
Bulgaria	1992	0	0
Bulgaria	1993	6	1
Bulgaria	1994	12	2
Bulgaria	1995	7	1
Bulgaria	1996	9	0
Bulgaria	1997	4	1
Bulgaria	1998	1	0
Total		45	5

Scores and results list Bulgaria's goal tally first, score column indicates score after each Letchkov goal.

List of international goals scored by Yordan Letchkov
No.	Date	Venue	Opponent	Score	Result	Competition
1	13 October 1993	Vasil Levski National Stadium, Sofia, Bulgaria	Austria	4–1	4–1	1994 FIFA World Cup qualification
2	26 June 1994	Soldier Field, Chicago, United States	Greece	3–0	4–0	1994 FIFA World Cup
3	10 July 1994	Giants Stadium, East Rutherford, New Jersey, United States	Germany	2–1	2–1	1994 FIFA World Cup
4	7 October 1995	Vasil Levski National Stadium, Sofia, Bulgaria	Albania	1–0	3–0	UEFA Euro 1996 qualification
5	8 June 1997	Neftochimik Stadium, Burgas, Bulgaria	Luxembourg	4–0	4–0	1998 FIFA World Cup qualification

== Honours ==
CSKA Sofia

- Bulgarian Championship: 1991–92

OFC Sliven

- Bulgarian Cup: 1990

Beşiktaş

- Turkish Cup: 1998

Bulgaria

- FIFA World Cup: fourth place 1994
