= Alexandru Guzun =

Moldovan football player

Personal information
- Date of birth: 29 September 1966 (age 60)
- Place of birth: Drăsliceni, Moldavian SSR, Soviet Union
- Height: 1.87 m (6 ft 2 in)
- Positions: Defender; midfielder

Youth career
- 1982: Izvoraș-67
- 1987: Inst. Ion Creangă

Senior career*
Years	Team	Apps	(Gls)
1989–1992	Tighina-Apoel	124	(6)
1992	Nyva Vinnytsia	23	(2)
1993–1994	Rapid București	31	(0)
1995–1998	Nistru Otaci	83	(9)
1996	→ Nyva Vinnytsia (loan)	3	(0)
1997	→ Tiligul Tiraspol (loan)	?	(?)
1998	Agro Chișinău	13	(1)
1999	Torpedo Zaporizhzhia	13	(0)
1999	Dnipro Dnipropetrovsk	2	(0)
1999	Mykolaiv	3	(0)
1999–2000	Agro Chișinău	5	(0)

International career
1991–2000	Moldova	22	(1)

Managerial career
- 2001–2002: Victoraș Suruceni
- 2002–2003: Moldova U21
- 2015–2016: Moldova U17
- 2017–2018: Moldova U16
- 2020: Moldova U21
- 2022–2023: Moldova U19
- 2023–2024: Moldova U20
- * Club domestic league appearances and goals

Alexandru Guzun (born 29 September 1966) is a Moldovan FIFA player agent, manager and former footballer who played as defender or midfielder.

During his career, Guzun played for several clubs from Moldova, Romania and Ukraine. He played in European cups for Niva, Rapid București and Tiligul Tiraspol. With Rapid, Guzun also played against Inter Milan at San Siro.

Alexandru Guzun also played 22 matches for the Moldova national football team, scoring 1 goal, against Germany in a 1–3 loss, on 14 October 2000, in Chișinău.

In 2001 Guzun returned as manager, and in 2004 returned as a FIFA player agent. In 2009 Alexandru Guzun was a candidate for the Moldovan Football Federation presidency, losing to Pavel Cebanu, who was elected for the fourth time as president.

== International goals ==
International goals of Alexandru Guzun
#	Date	Stadium	Opponent	Score	Result	Competition
1	14 October 1998	Stadionul Republican, Chișinău, Moldova	Germany	1–0	1–3	UEFA Euro 2000 qualifying
