= Gheorghe Stratulat =

Moldovan footballer

Personal information
- Date of birth: 13 March 1976 (age 50)
- Place of birth: Telenești, Moldova
- Height: 1.82 m (6 ft 0 in)
- Position: Midfielder

Senior career*
Years	Team	Apps	(Gls)
1992–1994	Zimbru Chişinău	23	(3)
1994–1997	Nistru Otaci	83	(23)
1997–1998	Politehnica Timișoara	11	(0)
1998–2000	Dnipro Dnipropetrovsk	29	(2)
1999	→ Dnipro-2 Dnipropetrovsk	3	(0)
2000–2002	Alania Vladikavkaz	27	(2)
2003–2007	Zob Ahan	115	(7)
2007–2008	Shahrdari Bandar Abbas	22	(2)

International career
1998–2001	Moldova	16	(1)
- * Club domestic league appearances and goals

Gheorghe Stratulat (born 13 March 1976) is a Moldovan former football player. He is also a former member of the Moldova national football team, making 16 appearances from 1998 to 2001. At the moment he is a FIFA-licensed players' agent.

== Early life ==
Stratulat graduated the sportive high school from Chisinau, in 1994. In 1994–1999, he graduated from the Academy of Economy from Moldova.

== Club career ==
=== F.C. Zimbru Chisinau, Moldova ===
With Zimbru Chisinau, he became the champion of Moldova, as senior and he won the Moldavian Cup.

=== F.C. Nistru Otaci, Moldova ===
With Nistru Otaci, he played two times in the final of Moldavian Cup.

=== F.C. Dnipro Dnipropetrovsk, Ukraine ===
At Dnipro Dnipropetrovsk, Stratulat played in the period when he was disputed by Andrei Shevchenko, Revbrov Kaladze from Dinamo, Kiev. After playing the match with Dinamo, Kiev and also with Shakhtar Donetsk, Gheorghe Stratulat was named the best player of the match.

=== F.C. Alania Vladikavkaz, Russia ===
With Alania Vladikavkaz he played in all the European Cups. In that period, Alania was one of the best club in the Russian Premier League.

=== Zob Ahan Esfahan, Iran ===
With Zob Ahan, from Iran, he won the Iranian Cup and got second place in Pro League. He participated also with Zobahan at the Champions League of Asia. Zobohan Esfahan, Iran is one of the best football clubs from Iran and Asia, showing its value with the best performances at the Champions League of Asia. On 2010–2011's edition Zob Ahan played the final of the Champions League from Asia.

== Personal life ==
Stratulat is married and has two children.
