= 2013–14 in English football =

- Season: 2013–14

Men's football
- Premier League: Manchester City
- Championship: Leicester City
- League One: Wolverhampton Wanderers
- League Two: Chesterfield
- Conference Premier: Luton Town
- FA Cup: Arsenal
- League Cup: Manchester City
- Community Shield: Manchester United

Women's football
- WSL 1: Liverpool
- WSL 2: Sunderland
- FA Women's Premier League Northern Division: Sheffield
- FA Women's Premier League Southern Division: Coventry City
- FA Women's Cup: Arsenal
- WSL Cup: Manchester City

The 2013–14 season was the 134th season of competitive football in England.

== Promotion and relegation ==
=== Preseason ===
League Division	▲ Promoted to...	▼ Relegated from...
Premier League	Cardiff City ▲; Hull City ▲; Crystal Palace ▲	Wigan Athletic ▼; Queens Park Rangers ▼; Reading ▼
Championship	Doncaster Rovers ▲; AFC Bournemouth ▲; Yeovil Town ▲	Peterborough United ▼; Wolverhampton Wanderers ▼; Bristol City ▼
League One	Gillingham ▲; Rotherham United ▲; Port Vale ▲; Bradford City ▲	Scunthorpe United ▼; Bury ▼; Hartlepool United ▼; Portsmouth ▼
League Two	Mansfield Town ▲; Newport County ▲	Barnet ▼; Aldershot Town ▼

=== Postseason ===
League Division	▲ Promoted to...	▼ Relegated from...
Premier League	Leicester City ▲; Burnley ▲; Queens Park Rangers ▲	Norwich City ▼; Fulham ▼; Cardiff City ▼
Championship	Wolverhampton Wanderers ▲; Brentford ▲; Rotherham United ▲	Doncaster Rovers ▼; Barnsley ▼; Yeovil Town ▼
League One	Chesterfield ▲; Scunthorpe United ▲; Rochdale ▲; Fleetwood Town ▲	Tranmere Rovers ▼; Carlisle United ▼; Shrewsbury Town ▼; Stevenage ▼
League Two	Luton Town ▲; Cambridge United ▲	Bristol Rovers ▼; Torquay United ▼

== England national football team ==
=== 2014 FIFA World Cup qualification ===
Pos	Team	Pld	W	D	L	GF	GA	GD	Pts	Qualification	England national football team	Ukraine national football team	Montenegro national football team	Poland national football team	Moldova national football team	San Marino national football team
1	England	10	6	4	0	31	4	+27	22	Qualification to 2014 FIFA World Cup	—	1–1	4–1	2–0	4–0	5–0
2	Ukraine	10	6	3	1	28	4	+24	21	Advance to second round	0–0	—	0–1	1–0	2–1	9–0
3	Montenegro	10	4	3	3	18	17	+1	15		1–1	0–4	—	2–2	2–5	3–0
4	Poland	10	3	4	3	18	12	+6	13		1–1	1–3	1–1	—	2–0	5–0
5	Moldova	10	3	2	5	12	17	−5	11		0–5	0–0	0–1	1–1	—	3–0
6	San Marino	10	0	0	10	1	54	−53	0		0–8	0–8	0–6	1–5	0–2	—

6 September 2013 2014 FIFA World; Cup qualifying	England	4–0	Moldova	Wembley, London
	Gerrard 12'; Lambert 26'; Welbeck (yellow card) 44', (goal) 45', 50'	Report	Golovatenco (yellow card) 27'	Stadium: Wembley Stadium; Attendance: 61,607; Referee: Ivan Kružliak (Slovakia)

10 September 2013 2014 FIFA World; Cup qualifying	Ukraine	0–0	England	Kyiv, Ukraine
	Kucher (yellow card) 62'	Report	Walker (yellow card) 71'	Stadium: NSK Olimpiyskiy; Attendance: 69,890; Referee: Pedro Proença (Portugal)

11 October 2013 2014 FIFA World; Cup qualifying	England	4–1	Montenegro	Wembley, London
	Rooney 49'; Walker (yellow card) 52'; Bošković 62' (o.g.); Townsend 78'; Sturridge 90+3' (pen.)	report	Pavićević (yellow card) 50'; Volkov (yellow card) 53'; Damjanović 71'	Stadium: Wembley Stadium; Attendance: 83,807; Referee: Alberto Undiano Mallenco (Spain)

15 October 2013 2014 FIFA World; Cup qualifying	England	2–0	Poland	Wembley, London
20:00	Rooney 41'; Gerrard 88'	Report		Stadium: Wembley Stadium; Attendance: 85,186; Referee: Damir Skomina (Slovenia)

=== International friendlies ===
14 August 2013 Friendly	England	3–2	Scotland	Wembley, London
	Walcott 28'; Welbeck 53'; Lambert 70'		Morrison 11'; Miller 49'	Stadium: Wembley Stadium; Attendance: 80,486; Referee: Felix Brych (Germany)

5 March 2014 Friendly	England	1–0	Denmark	Wembley, London
20:00 GMT	Sturridge 82'	Report		Stadium: Wembley; Attendance: 68,573; Referee: Kevin Blom (Netherlands)

30 May 2014 Friendly	England	3–0	Peru	Wembley, London
20:00 BST	Sturridge 32'; Cahill 65'; Jagielka 70'	Report		Stadium: Wembley; Attendance: 83,578; Referee: Viktor Kassai

4 June 2014 Friendly	Ecuador	2–2	England	Miami, Florida
20:00 BST	E. Valencia 8'; Arroyo 70'; A. Valencia (red card) 79'	Report	Rooney 29'; Lambert 51'; Sterling (red card) 79'	Stadium: Sun Life Stadium; Attendance: 21,534; Referee: Jair Marrufo

7 June 2014 Friendly	England	0–0	Honduras	Miami, Florida
21:45 BST		Report	Beckeles (yellow card) 51' (yellow-red card) 66'	Stadium: Sun Life Stadium; Attendance: 45,379; Referee: Ricardo Salazar

=== 2014 FIFA World Cup ===
Pos	Team	Pld	W	D	L	GF	GA	GD	Pts	Qualification
1	Costa Rica	3	2	1	0	4	1	+3	7	Advance to knockout stage
2	Uruguay	3	2	0	1	4	4	0	6	Advance to knockout stage
3	Italy	3	1	0	2	2	3	−1	3	
4	England	3	0	1	2	2	4	−2	1	

Source: FIFA
Rules for classification: Tie-breaking criteria

14 June 2014 2014 FIFA World Cup Group D	England	1–2	Italy	Manaus, Brazil
23:00 BST	Sturridge 37'	Report	Marchisio 35'; Balotelli 50'	Stadium: Arena Amazonia; Attendance: 39,800; Referee: Björn Kuipers

19 June 2014 2014 FIFA World Cup Group D	Uruguay	2–1	England	São Paulo, Brazil
20:00 BST	Suárez 39', 85'	Report	Rooney 75'	Stadium: Arena de Sao Paulo; Attendance: 62,575; Referee: Carlos Velasco Carballo (Spain)

24 June 2014 2014 FIFA World Cup Group D	England	0–0	Costa Rica	Belo Horizonte, Brazil
17:00 BST		Report		Stadium: Mineirão; Attendance: 57,823; Referee: Djamel Haimoudi (Algeria)

== League tables ==
=== Premier League ===
In a season marked with constant changes at the top of the table, Manchester City won their second Premier League title in Chilean Manuel Pellegrini's first season in charge. Despite being overwhelming favourites at the start of the season, they were only able to confirm top spot after a final day victory against West Ham. They also won the League Cup, marking their first domestic double in a season where they dropped points at home just twice. Liverpool took second place, but did not always look like they were going to finish in the top 4; an 11-match winning run from February to April left them in a good position to end their 24-year wait for a league title, but a home defeat to Chelsea with only three games remaining, followed by a 3–3 draw at Crystal Palace where they threw away a 3–0 lead in ten minutes, ultimately proved fatal to their title challenge. The season was nonetheless a massive improvement, as they qualified for the Champions League for the first time in five years and striker Luis Suárez was the league's top marksman with 31 goals, despite not even playing for the first five games. This was also the first Premier League season where both of the top two sides broke the 100-goal mark.

After six years managing in both Italy and Spain, José Mourinho returned to Chelsea. But unlike his first season back in 2004, their campaign ended in disappointment, despite the Blues managing a serious title challenge for the first time since 2010. While they pulled off big wins against the top teams, dropped points to relegation battlers proved to be their undoing. Arsenal took the final Champions League spot, having led the league for a large part of the season before injuries to key players and a terrible run of form in the spring starting with a 5–1 loss at Liverpool, as well as heavy away losses at Chelsea (6–0) and Everton (3–0), ultimately consigned them to their sixth fourth-place finish in eight years, though they at least ended their nine-year trophy drought by winning the FA Cup.

Roberto Martínez's first season in charge of Everton saw the blue half of Merseyside take fifth place, making a serious challenge for the final Champions League spot, but ultimately falling short. Tottenham Hotspur, despite a somewhat turbulent season that saw the departure of Gareth Bale, the sacking of André Villas-Boas a few days before Christmas, and replacement manager Tim Sherwood days after the season ended, took sixth place and the final Europa League spot.

Arguably, the biggest shock of the season was defending champions Manchester United's woeful relinquishment of their Premier League trophy. The retirement of Sir Alex Ferguson, an aging squad, no youth policy to replace those players and terrible form at home (including losses to West Bromwich Albion, Newcastle United, Sunderland and Everton, who had never won at United under former boss and current United manager David Moyes, alongside a first ever defeat in their history to Swansea City, in a third round FA Cup exit), meant they surrendered their crown as early as December. This poor form saw Moyes dismissed as manager after less than a year, and a late improvement under the caretaker management of United veteran Ryan Giggs ultimately was not enough to take sixth place. This meant that United finished seventh, their lowest finish in the Premier League era, and failed to qualify for Europe for the first time since English clubs were re-admitted to Europe in 1990. It was also the first time in the Premier League era that they did not finish in the top four.

In a surprising turn of events, Crystal Palace fared the best of the three promoted clubs, finishing 11th. Few had given them any hope of surviving after they lost nine of their first ten games under Ian Holloway, while at the time had played four Premier League seasons suffering relegation in every one. However, a huge improvement after Tony Pulis took over as manager meant that the Eagles would be playing a second consecutive season in the Premier League for the first time ever. Hull City also performed reasonably well, never being seriously threatened with relegation and managing a highest-ever finish of 16th place, along with reaching the FA Cup Final.

Sunderland became only the second club to beat the "Curse of Christmas", as they were bottom on Christmas Day (and in fact for much of the campaign), but a late rally of 13 points from their final 6 games saw them earn survival. There was some controversy over their season, as they fielded an ineligible player in four early games, yet were not deducted points as would happen in the Football League and Conference; ultimately though, Sunderland would have lost just one point from such a deduction, not enough to result in their relegation.

Cardiff City's first Premier League season resulted in a bottom-place finish and an immediate relegation back to the Championship, despite breaking the 30-point mark. Their season had begun reasonably well, but quickly imploded after promotion-winning manager Malky Mackay was controversially sacked after a fall-out with club owner Vincent Tan in regards to tactics. Ole Gunnar Solskjær was drafted in, but was unable to save the Welsh side from the drop despite some positive results. Fulham's 13-year stay in the Premier League came to a disastrous end after a season in which they employed three different managers (Martin Jol, René Meulensteen and Felix Magath) and conceded 85 goals, the most out of the bottom 3 and the second-most conceded by a team in the Premier League under the 38-game format. Norwich City occupied the third relegation spot, as an inability to score (they were outscored by Suárez), atrocious away form (winning just twice) and a disastrous end to the season that saw them pick up just 1 point from a possible 21, as well as the sacking of Chris Hughton and appointment of youth team coach Neil Adams all cost them dearly, and resulted in them returning to the Championship after three years.

==== League table ====
Pos	Team	Pld	W	D	L	GF	GA	GD	Pts	Qualification or relegation
1	Manchester City (C)	38	27	5	6	102	37	+65	86	Qualification for the Champions League group stage
2	Liverpool	38	26	6	6	101	50	+51	84	Qualification for the Champions League group stage
3	Chelsea	38	25	7	6	71	27	+44	82	Qualification for the Champions League group stage
4	Arsenal	38	24	7	7	68	41	+27	79	Qualification for the Champions League play-off round
5	Everton	38	21	9	8	61	39	+22	72	Qualification for the Europa League group stage
6	Tottenham Hotspur	38	21	6	11	55	51	+4	69	Qualification for the Europa League play-off round (Note: Since the winners of 2013–14 Football League Cup (Manchester City) qualified for the Champions League, the spot awarded to them (Europa League play-off round) was passed to the 6th-placed team.)
7	Manchester United	38	19	7	12	64	43	+21	64	
8	Southampton	38	15	11	12	54	46	+8	56	
9	Stoke City	38	13	11	14	45	52	−7	50	
10	Newcastle United	38	15	4	19	43	59	−16	49	
11	Crystal Palace	38	13	6	19	33	48	−15	45	
12	Swansea City	38	11	9	18	54	54	0	42	
13	West Ham United	38	11	7	20	40	51	−11	40	
14	Sunderland	38	10	8	20	41	60	−19	38	
15	Aston Villa	38	10	8	20	39	61	−22	38	
16	Hull City	38	10	7	21	38	53	−15	37	Qualification for the Europa League third qualifying round (Note: Hull City qualified for the Europa League third qualifying round as runners-up of the 2013–14 FA Cup since winners Arsenal qualified for Champions League.)
17	West Bromwich Albion	38	7	15	16	43	59	−16	36	
18	Norwich City (R)	38	8	9	21	28	62	−34	33	Relegation to Football League Championship
19	Fulham (R)	38	9	5	24	40	85	−45	32	Relegation to Football League Championship
20	Cardiff City (R)	38	7	9	22	32	74	−42	30	Relegation to Football League Championship

Source: Barclays Premier League
Rules for classification: 1) Points; 2) Goal difference; 3) Goals scored; 4) Play-offs (only if needed to decide champion, teams for relegation or teams for UEFA competitions).
(C) Champions; (R) Relegated

=== Championship ===
After the previous season's play-off failure, Leicester City ended their decade-long exile from the Premier League by gaining promotion as champions, topping the division on Boxing Day and never surrendering their lead. Joining them were Burnley, who many had tipped for relegation, but ultimately achieved automatic promotion in Sean Dyche's first full season in charge of the Lancashire club. The 41-goal strike partnership of exciting duo Danny Ings and Sam Vokes was enough to return the Clarets to the top-flight after four years. Queens Park Rangers had to settle for the play-offs after topping the table for much of the first half of the season, scraping past Derby County in the final at Wembley to make an instant return to the Premier League.

The other two newly relegated sides, Wigan and Reading, also did well. The Latics overcame the sacking of Owen Coyle, with his replacement Uwe Rosler guiding them to the play-off places, going unbeaten in 16 of his first 18 league matches along the way, but they couldn't finish higher than 5th and they lost to QPR in the playoff semifinals in extra time. Reading missed the playoffs by a single point after Brighton grabbed a late winner against Nottingham Forest, but the Royals were in contention for promotion for virtually the whole season, with inconsistent form preventing them from finishing higher.

In only their fourth ever campaign in the second tier, Bournemouth finished an impressive 10th, despite not being in contention for either promotion or relegation for most of the season. Blackpool had gotten to a hot start, winning 5 of their first 6 and standing fourth at the end of November, but lost 10 out of their next 12 over the next two months, costing Paul Ince his job and leading to the Tangerines to a 17-match winless run which sunk them to the relegation battle, alongside scoring the fewest goals in the division, but 3 wins under caretaker manager Barry Ferguson meant they stayed up.

Yeovil Town finished bottom, struggling all season long and failing to make a serious impression in their first-ever campaign at this level. Barnsley were unable to repeat the escape from relegation they managed the previous year and went down in second-bottom place, with not even the return of the club's most successful manager, Danny Wilson, saving them. Doncaster Rovers were relegated on the final day in dramatic fashion. Going into the last game of the season a point above the relegation zone, they knew they only had to match the result of relegation rivals Birmingham City. As it transpired, they lost to Leicester, whilst Birmingham staged a miraculous comeback to draw at Bolton (having been two goals down with 14 minutes remaining), equalizing in the final few seconds of the game to send Doncaster back to League One after just a year.

==== League table ====
Pos	Team	Pld	W	D	L	GF	GA	GD	Pts	Promotion, qualification or relegation
1	Leicester City (C, P)	46	31	9	6	83	43	+40	102	Promotion to the Premier League
2	Burnley (P)	46	26	15	5	72	37	+35	93	Promotion to the Premier League
3	Derby County	46	25	10	11	84	52	+32	85	Qualification for Championship play-offs
4	Queens Park Rangers (O, P)	46	23	11	12	60	44	+16	80	Qualification for Championship play-offs
5	Wigan Athletic	46	21	10	15	61	48	+13	73	Qualification for Championship play-offs
6	Brighton & Hove Albion	46	19	15	12	55	40	+15	72	Qualification for Championship play-offs
7	Reading	46	19	14	13	70	56	+14	71	
8	Blackburn Rovers	46	18	16	12	70	62	+8	70	
9	Ipswich Town	46	18	14	14	60	54	+6	68	
10	Bournemouth	46	18	12	16	67	66	+1	66	
11	Nottingham Forest	46	16	17	13	67	64	+3	65	
12	Middlesbrough	46	16	16	14	62	50	+12	64	
13	Watford	46	15	15	16	74	64	+10	60	
14	Bolton Wanderers	46	14	17	15	59	60	−1	59	
15	Leeds United	46	16	9	21	59	67	−8	57	
16	Sheffield Wednesday	46	13	14	19	63	65	−2	53	
17	Huddersfield Town	46	14	11	21	58	65	−7	53	
18	Charlton Athletic	46	13	12	21	41	61	−20	51	
19	Millwall	46	11	15	20	46	74	−28	48	
20	Blackpool	46	11	13	22	38	66	−28	46	
21	Birmingham City	46	11	11	24	58	74	−16	44	
22	Doncaster Rovers (R)	46	11	11	24	39	70	−31	44	Relegation to Football League One
23	Barnsley (R)	46	9	12	25	44	77	−33	39	Relegation to Football League One
24	Yeovil Town (R)	46	8	13	25	44	75	−31	37	Relegation to Football League One

Source: BBC Sport
Rules for classification: 1) points; 2) goal difference; 3) number of goals scored
(C) Champions; (O) Play-off winners; (P) Promoted; (R) Relegated

=== League One ===
After two successive relegations, Wolverhampton Wanderers turned their fortunes around under Kenny Jackett and made an immediate return to the Championship, while also setting a new record of 103 points for the third tier. Brentford shrugged off the loss of Wigan-bound Uwe Rosler and took the runners-up spot as replacement boss Mark Warburton enjoyed a highly successful first season as manager, taking the Bees to the second tier for the first time in 21 years. Rotherham United were victorious in the play-offs, repeating their early 2000s feat of earning consecutive promotions from the fourth and third tiers. But one of the biggest shocks of the season was Leyton Orient, who won their first eight games of the season and seemed unstoppable, cementing themselves firmly in the automatic promotion spots before several bursts of indifferent form pushed them down to third; they would reach Wembley for the play-off final before losing to Rotherham on penalties.

But arguably, perhaps the biggest surprise of the whole English season was Sheffield United; in the relegation zone by September, they sacked manager David Weir and replaced him with Nigel Clough. At first, it appeared the appointment was in vain as they stood in the relegation zone by the end of the year; however, starting with a staggering FA Cup win over Premier League side Aston Villa in the third round, they went on a major unbeaten run in both league and cup as Nigel employed the managerial tactics of his father Brian to help the club fight their way to the top of the table. In the FA Cup, they stunned their way through each round to book their place in the semi-finals at Wembley against Hull. Whilst they lost 5–3, Clough was praised for his work in both of the club's remaining competitions. The Blades finished in seventh place, just missing out on the playoffs, but a far cry from the relegation zone they were in at the end of the year.

Stevenage, whose fortunes had rapidly declined since their play-off appearance two years prior, were relegated in bottom place. Shrewsbury finished second-bottom, only staying ahead of Stevenage on goal difference. Carlisle United finished in third-bottom place, staying clear of the relegation zone for much of the season, but ultimately going down after a terrible end to the season saw them win just 1 of their last 15 matches. Tranmere Rovers, whose season rapidly fell apart after manager Ronnie Moore was suspended (and later sacked) for betting-related offences in February, occupied the final relegation spot and fell into the fourth tier for the first time since 1989. Crewe were in the relegation zone for nearly the whole season, before a good late run of form pushed them up to 19th, albeit with the most goals conceded in the league and second-worst across all 4 divisions of League football.

==== League table ====
Pos	Team	Pld	W	D	L	GF	GA	GD	Pts	Promotion, qualification or relegation
1	Wolverhampton Wanderers (C, P)	46	31	10	5	89	31	+58	103	Promotion to Football League Championship
2	Brentford (P)	46	28	10	8	72	43	+29	94	Promotion to Football League Championship
3	Leyton Orient	46	25	11	10	85	45	+40	86	Qualification for League One play-offs (Note: Four teams play for one spot and promotion to Football League Championship.)
4	Rotherham United (O, P)	46	24	14	8	86	58	+28	86	Qualification for League One play-offs
5	Preston North End	46	23	16	7	72	46	+26	85	Qualification for League One play-offs
6	Peterborough United	46	23	5	18	72	58	+14	74	Qualification for League One play-offs
7	Sheffield United	46	18	13	15	48	46	+2	67	
8	Swindon Town	46	19	9	18	63	59	+4	66	
9	Port Vale	46	18	7	21	59	73	−14	61	
10	Milton Keynes Dons	46	17	9	20	63	65	−2	60	
11	Bradford City	46	14	17	15	57	54	+3	59	
12	Bristol City	46	13	19	14	70	67	+3	58	
13	Walsall	46	14	16	16	49	49	0	58	
14	Crawley Town	46	14	15	17	48	54	−6	57	
15	Oldham Athletic	46	14	14	18	50	59	−9	56	
16	Colchester United	46	13	14	19	53	61	−8	53	
17	Gillingham	46	15	8	23	60	79	−19	53	
18	Coventry City	46	16	13	17	74	77	−3	51 (Note: On 2 August Coventry City were deducted 10 points for exiting administration without a CVA.)	
19	Crewe Alexandra	46	13	12	21	54	80	−26	51	
20	Notts County	46	15	5	26	64	77	−13	50	
21	Tranmere Rovers (R)	46	12	11	23	52	79	−27	47	Relegation to Football League Two
22	Carlisle United (R)	46	11	12	23	43	76	−33	45	Relegation to Football League Two
23	Shrewsbury Town (R)	46	9	15	22	44	65	−21	42	Relegation to Football League Two
24	Stevenage (R)	46	11	9	26	46	72	−26	42	Relegation to Football League Two

Updated to match(es) played on 3 May 2014. Source: BBC Sport
Rules for classification: 1) Points; 2) Goal difference; 3) Number of goals scored
(C) Champions; (O) Play-off winners; (P) Promoted; (R) Relegated

=== League Two ===
Chesterfield won the League Two title for the second time in three years. Scunthorpe earned an immediate promotion as runners-up; after an uninspiring start under previous manager Brian Laws, the appointment of long-serving coach Russ Wilcox as manager saw them only lose one more match (by which time they had already been promoted) for the rest of the season. Rochdale took the final automatic promotion spot, as Keith Hill quickly brought success in his second spell as manager, earning his second promotion with the club, and only the club's third-ever promotion overall. Fleetwood Town lost out in the race for automatic promotion, but made up for this by winning the play-offs, entering League One for the first time ever.

Portsmouth's 13th-placed finish in the fourth tier was the lowest in their history, but it could've been a lot worse as they spent most of the season fighting relegation. An end-of-season run of five wins out of seven boosted them up the table, following the resignation of Richie Barker and appointment of Andy Awford.

Torquay United suffered their second relegation from the Football League, with not even a late revival in form sparing them from another bottom-place finish. Bristol Rovers, who had been continuous members of the Football League since 1920 (and ironically, the last side to finish second-bottom of the League without being relegated) went down on the last day; they had never once been in the relegation zone prior to that day and looked the safest of the three sides in danger, but wins for rivals Northampton Town and Wycombe Wanderers condemned Rovers to the Football Conference for the first time ever.

==== League table ====
Pos	Team	Pld	W	D	L	GF	GA	GD	Pts	Promotion, qualification or relegation
1	Chesterfield (C, P)	46	23	15	8	71	40	+31	84	Promotion to Football League One
2	Scunthorpe United (P)	46	20	21	5	68	44	+24	81	Promotion to Football League One
3	Rochdale (P)	46	24	9	13	69	48	+21	81	Promotion to Football League One
4	Fleetwood Town (O, P)	46	22	10	14	66	52	+14	76	Qualification for League Two play-offs
5	Southend United	46	19	15	12	56	39	+17	72	Qualification for League Two play-offs
6	Burton Albion	46	19	15	12	47	42	+5	72	Qualification for League Two play-offs
7	York City	46	18	17	11	52	41	+11	71	Qualification for League Two play-offs
8	Oxford United	46	16	14	16	53	50	+3	62	
9	Dagenham & Redbridge	46	15	15	16	53	59	−6	60	
10	Plymouth Argyle	46	16	12	18	51	58	−7	60	
11	Mansfield Town	46	15	15	16	49	58	−9	60	
12	Bury	46	13	20	13	59	51	+8	59	
13	Portsmouth	46	14	17	15	56	66	−10	59	
14	Newport County	46	14	16	16	56	59	−3	58	
15	Accrington Stanley	46	14	15	17	54	56	−2	57	
16	Exeter City	46	14	13	19	54	57	−3	55	
17	Cheltenham Town	46	13	16	17	53	63	−10	55	
18	Morecambe	46	13	15	18	52	64	−12	54	
19	Hartlepool United	46	14	11	21	50	56	−6	53	
20	AFC Wimbledon	46	14	14	18	49	57	−8	53 (Note: On 28 April AFC Wimbledon were deducted 3 points for fielding an ineligible player.)	
21	Northampton Town	46	13	14	19	42	57	−15	53	
22	Wycombe Wanderers	46	12	14	20	46	54	−8	50	
23	Bristol Rovers (R)	46	12	14	20	43	54	−11	50	Relegation to the Conference Premier
24	Torquay United (R)	46	12	9	25	42	66	−24	45	Relegation to the Conference Premier

Updated to match(es) played on 3 May 2014. Source: BBC Sport
Rules for classification: 1) Points; 2) Goal difference; 3) Number of goals scored
(C) Champions; (O) Play-off winners; (P) Promoted; (R) Relegated

=== Football Conference (Top Division) ===
Luton Town comfortably won the Conference National's automatic promotion spot, ending their five-year exile from the Football League. Cambridge United fell short after battling with Luton for the title during the majority of the season, but ultimately won promotion through the play-offs, returning to the League after nine years in the Conference.

At the bottom of the table, Hyde were relegated after a truly awful season in which they won just one game and recorded the Conference National's lowest-ever points total. Tamworth were relegated back to the Conference North after five years. Initially, Dartford and Chester were relegated after two seasons and one season respectively in the Conference Premier. However, both clubs were reprieved from relegation as a result of Hereford United and Salisbury City being expelled from the Football Conference due to financial problems. This would be the final season completed by both clubs, as Salisbury went into liquidation before they were accepted into another league, while Hereford also went into liquidation halfway through the following season in the Southern League.

==== League table ====
Pos	Team	Pld	W	D	L	GF	GA	GD	Pts	Promotion, qualification or relegation
1	Luton Town (C, P)	46	30	11	5	102	35	+67	101	Promotion to Football League Two
2	Cambridge United (O, P)	46	23	13	10	72	35	+37	82	Qualification for the Conference Premier play-offs
3	Gateshead	46	22	13	11	72	50	+22	79	Qualification for the Conference Premier play-offs
4	Grimsby Town	46	22	12	12	65	46	+19	78	Qualification for the Conference Premier play-offs
5	FC Halifax Town	46	22	11	13	85	58	+27	77	Qualification for the Conference Premier play-offs
6	Braintree Town	46	21	11	14	57	39	+18	74	
7	Kidderminster Harriers	46	20	12	14	66	59	+7	72	
8	Barnet	46	19	13	14	58	53	+5	70	
9	Woking	46	20	8	18	66	69	−3	68	
10	Forest Green Rovers	46	19	10	17	80	66	+14	67	
11	Alfreton Town	46	21	7	18	69	74	−5	67 (Note: Alfreton Town were deducted three points for fielding an ineligible player.)	
12	Salisbury City	46	19	10	17	58	63	−5	67 (Note: On 13 June 2014, Salisbury City were demoted to the Conference South due to financial irregularities. Because of this, Dartford were reprieved from relegation. Salisbury were subsequently expelled from the Football Conference altogether on 4 July 2014, after which they went into liquidation.)	Club expelled & folded
13	Nuneaton Town	46	18	12	16	54	60	−6	66	
14	Lincoln City	46	17	14	15	60	59	+1	65	
15	Macclesfield Town	46	18	7	21	62	63	−1	61	
16	Welling United	46	16	12	18	59	61	−2	60	
17	Wrexham	46	16	11	19	61	61	0	59	
18	Southport	46	14	11	21	53	71	−18	53	
19	Aldershot Town	46	16	13	17	69	62	+7	51 (Note: Aldershot Town were deducted ten points for entering administration.)	
20	Hereford United (R)	46	13	12	21	44	63	−19	51 (Note: On 10 June 2014, Hereford United were expelled from the Conference due to financial irregularities. They were later accepted into the Southern League. Because of this, Chester were reprieved from relegation.)	Demoted to the Southern League Premier Division
21	Chester	46	12	15	19	49	70	−21	51	
22	Dartford	46	12	8	26	49	74	−25	44	
23	Tamworth (R)	46	10	9	27	43	81	−38	39	Relegation to Conference North
24	Hyde (R)	46	1	7	38	38	119	−81	10	Relegation to Conference North

Source: Football Conference
Rules for classification: 1) points; 2) goal difference; 3) number of goals scored.
(C) Champions; (O) Play-off winners; (P) Promoted; (R) Relegated

== Women's football ==
=== Women's Super League ===
==== Women's Super League 1 ====
Pos	Team	Pld	W	D	L	GF	GA	GD	Pts	Qualification or relegation
1	Liverpool (C)	14	7	5	2	19	10	+9	26	Qualification for the Champions League knockout phase
2	Chelsea	14	8	2	4	23	16	+7	26	Qualification for the Champions League knockout phase
3	Birmingham City	14	7	4	3	20	14	+6	25	
4	Arsenal	14	6	3	5	24	21	+3	21	
5	Manchester City	14	6	1	7	13	16	−3	19	
6	Notts County	14	4	6	4	12	8	+4	18	
7	Bristol Academy	14	5	1	8	18	24	−6	16	
8	Everton (R)	14	0	4	10	10	30	−20	4	Relegated to FA WSL 2

Source: FA WSL
Rules for classification: 1) Points; 2) Goal difference; 3) Number of goals scored
(C) Champions; (R) Relegated

==== Women's Super League 2 ====
Pos	Team	Pld	W	D	L	GF	GA	GD	Pts	Promotion
1	Sunderland (C)	18	15	2	1	47	15	+32	47	Promotion to FA WSL 1
2	Doncaster Rovers Belles	18	14	3	1	56	14	+42	45	
3	Reading	18	13	2	3	60	21	+39	41	
4	Aston Villa	18	9	3	6	25	26	−1	30	
5	Yeovil Town	18	6	4	8	27	26	+1	22	
6	Durham	18	5	3	10	19	32	−13	18	
7	Watford	18	5	3	10	22	37	−15	18	
8	Millwall Lionesses	18	4	3	11	20	36	−16	15	
9	Oxford United	18	3	3	12	16	44	−28	12	
10	London Bees	18	2	2	14	16	57	−41	8	

Source: BBC Sport
Rules for classification: 1) Points; 2) Goal difference; 3) Number of goals scored
(C) Champions

=== Women's Premier League ===
==== Northern Division ====
Pos	Team	Pld	W	D	L	GF	GA	GD	Pts	Promotion or relegation
1	Sheffield (C)	20	17	2	1	74	15	+59	53	
2	Preston North End	20	12	1	7	49	39	+10	37	
3	Bradford City	20	11	2	7	36	33	+3	35	
4	Nottingham Forest	20	10	3	7	44	24	+20	33	
5	Stoke City	20	10	3	7	51	45	+6	33	
6	Sporting Club Albion	20	8	4	8	36	34	+2	28	
7	Derby County	20	7	4	9	45	51	−6	25	
8	Wolverhampton Wanderers	20	6	2	12	28	48	−20	20	
9	Blackburn Rovers	20	5	3	12	29	51	−22	18	
10	Newcastle United	20	5	2	13	33	66	−33	17	
11	Leeds United (R)	20	4	4	12	37	56	−19	16	Relegation to the Northern Division One

Source: FA WPL
(C) Champions; (R) Relegated

==== Southern Division ====
Pos	Team	Pld	W	D	L	GF	GA	GD	Pts	Promotion or relegation
1	Coventry City (C)	20	14	4	2	42	14	+28	46	Moved to the Northern Division
2	Gillingham	20	14	2	4	58	21	+37	44	
3	Cardiff City	20	12	4	4	55	24	+31	40	
4	Portsmouth	20	12	1	7	42	29	+13	37	
5	Charlton Athletic	20	9	5	6	39	35	+4	32	
6	Lewes	20	9	4	7	31	32	−1	31	
7	Brighton & Hove Albion	20	7	2	11	32	31	+1	23	
8	Tottenham Hotspur	20	6	4	10	27	36	−9	22	
9	Keynsham Town	20	6	1	13	40	52	−12	19	
10	West Ham United	20	4	3	13	25	48	−23	15	
11	Chesham United (R)	20	2	0	18	15	84	−69	6	Relegation to the Southern Region League First Division - Northern

Source: FA WPL
(C) Champions; (R) Relegated

=== FA Women's Cup ===
==== Final ====
1 June 2014
15:00 BST

Arsenal	2–0	Everton
Smith 15'; Kinga 61'	Report

stadium:mk, Milton Keynes
Attendance: 15,098
Referee: Martin Atkinson (West Riding)

=== FA WSL Cup ===
==== Final ====
16 October 2014
19:45 BST

Arsenal	0–1	Manchester City
	Report	Christiansen 73'

Adams Park, High Wycombe
Attendance: 3,697
Referee: Nigel Lugg (Surrey)

== Managerial changes ==
Team	Outgoing manager	Manner of departure	Date of departure	Position in table	Incoming manager	Date of appointment
Doncaster Rovers	(Wales) Brian Flynn	End of contract	3 May 2013	Pre-season	(Scotland) Paul Dickov	20 May 2013
Millwall	(Wales) Kenny Jackett	Resigned	7 May 2013	Pre-season	(Northern Ireland) Steve Lomas	6 June 2013
Stoke City	(Wales) Tony Pulis	Mutual Consent	21 May 2013	Pre-season	(Wales) Mark Hughes	30 May 2013
Chelsea	(Spain) Rafael Benítez	End of interim contract	27 May 2013	Pre-season	(Portugal) José Mourinho	3 June 2013
Wigan Athletic	(Spain) Roberto Martínez	Resigned	28 May 2013	Pre-season	(Scotland) Owen Coyle	14 June 2013
Sheffield United	(England) Chris Morgan	End of caretaker tenure	10 June 2013	Pre-season	(Scotland) David Weir	10 June 2013
Brighton & Hove Albion	(Uruguay) Gus Poyet	Sacked	23 June 2013	Pre-season	(Spain) Óscar García Junyent	26 June 2013
Everton	(Scotland) David Moyes	End of contract	1 July 2013	Pre-season	(Spain) Roberto Martínez	5 June 2013
Manchester United	(Scotland) Sir Alex Ferguson	Retired	1 July 2013	Pre-season	(Scotland) David Moyes	1 July 2013
Swindon Town	(Scotland) Kevin MacDonald	Mutual consent	13 July 2013	Pre-season	(England) Mark Cooper	20 August 2013
Gateshead	(England) Anth Smith	Resigned	18 August 2013	21st	(England) Gary Mills	3 September 2013
Carlisle United	(England) Greg Abbott	Sacked	9 September 2013	22nd	(Republic of Ireland) Graham Kavanagh	30 September 2013
Sunderland	(Italy) Paolo Di Canio	Sacked	22 September 2013	20th	(Uruguay) Gus Poyet	8 October 2013
Derby County	(England) Nigel Clough	Sacked	28 September 2013	14th	(England) Steve McClaren	30 September 2013
Sheffield United	(Scotland) David Weir	Sacked	11 October 2013	22nd	(England) Nigel Clough	23 October 2013
Gillingham	(England) Martin Allen	Sacked	13 October 2013	17th	(England) Peter Taylor	14 October 2013
Bury	(England) Kevin Blackwell	Sacked	14 October 2013	21st	(England) Ronnie Jepson	25 October 2013
Middlesbrough	(England) Tony Mowbray	Mutual consent	21 October 2013	16th	(Spain) Aitor Karanka	13 November 2013
Crystal Palace	(England) Ian Holloway	Mutual consent	23 October 2013	19th	(Wales) Tony Pulis	23 November 2013
Notts County	(England) Chris Kiwomya	Mutual consent	27 October 2013	24th	(England) Shaun Derry	6 November 2013
Portsmouth	(England) Guy Whittingham	Sacked	25 November 2013	17th	(England) Richie Barker	9 December 2013
Crawley Town	(England) Richie Barker	Sacked	27 November 2013	12th	(England) John Gregory	3 December 2013
Bristol City	(Republic of Ireland) Sean O'Driscoll	Sacked	28 November 2013	22nd	(England) Steve Cotterill	3 December 2013
Barnsley	(England) David Flitcroft	Sacked	30 November 2013	24th	(Northern Ireland) Danny Wilson	17 December 2013
Sheffield Wednesday	(England) Dave Jones	Sacked	1 December 2013	23rd	(England) Stuart Gray	25 January 2014
Fulham	(Netherlands) Martin Jol	Sacked	1 December 2013	18th	(Netherlands) René Meulensteen	1 December 2013
Wigan Athletic	(Republic of Ireland) Owen Coyle	Sacked	2 December 2013	14th	(Germany) Uwe Rösler	7 December 2013
Brentford	(Germany) Uwe Rösler	Signed by Wigan Athletic	7 December 2013	4th	(England) Mark Warburton	10 December 2013
Bury	(England) Ronnie Jepson	End of contract	9 December 2013	20th	(England) David Flitcroft	9 December 2013
West Bromwich Albion	(Scotland) Steve Clarke	Sacked	14 December 2013	16th	(Spain) Pepe Mel	9 January 2014
Tottenham Hotspur	(Portugal) André Villas-Boas	Sacked	16 December 2013	7th	(England) Tim Sherwood	23 December 2013
Watford	(Italy) Gianfranco Zola	Resigned	16 December 2013	13th	(Italy) Giuseppe Sannino	18 December 2013
Northampton Town	(England) Aidy Boothroyd	Sacked	21 December 2013	24th	(England) Chris Wilder	27 January 2014
Millwall	(Northern Ireland) Steve Lomas	Sacked	26 December 2013	20th	(England) Ian Holloway	9 January 2014
Cardiff City	(Scotland) Malky Mackay	Sacked	27 December 2013	16th	(Norway) Ole Gunnar Solskjær	2 January 2014
Torquay United	(Wales) Alan Knill	Sacked	2 January 2014	23rd	(England) Chris Hargreaves	6 January 2014
Blackpool	(England) Paul Ince	Sacked	21 January 2014	14th	(Belgium) José Riga	11 June 2014
Shrewsbury Town	(England) Graham Turner	Resigned	21 January 2014	21st	(England) Michael Jackson	22 January 2014
Oxford United	(England) Chris Wilder	Signed by Northampton Town	27 January 2014	6th	(England) Gary Waddock	22 March 2014
Swansea City	(Denmark) Michael Laudrup	Sacked	4 February 2014	12th	(England) Garry Monk	7 May 2014
Fulham	(Netherlands) René Meulensteen	Sacked	14 February 2014	20th	(Germany) Felix Magath	14 February 2014
Charlton Athletic	(England) Chris Powell	Sacked	11 March 2014	24th	(Belgium) José Riga	11 March 2014
Nottingham Forest	(Scotland) Billy Davies	Sacked	24 March 2014	7th	(England) Stuart Pearce	1 July 2014
Portsmouth	(England) Richie Barker	Sacked	27 March 2014	22nd	(England) Andy Awford	1 May 2014
Bristol Rovers	(England) John Ward	Became Director of Football	28 March 2014	20th	(England) Darrell Clarke	28 March 2014
Norwich City	(Republic of Ireland) Chris Hughton	Sacked	6 April 2014	17th	(England) Neil Adams	6 April 2014
Tranmere Rovers	(England) Ronnie Moore	Sacked	9 April 2014	19th	(Wales) Rob Edwards	27 May 2014
Manchester United	(Scotland) David Moyes	Sacked	22 April 2014	7th	(Netherlands) Louis van Gaal	19 May 2014

== Transfers ==
List of English football transfers summer 2013

== Deaths ==
- 10 June 2013: Don Roby, 79, former Notts County F.C. and Derby County right half.
- 17 June 2013: Geoff Strong, 75, former Arsenal, Liverpool and Coventry City defender.
- 4 July 2013: Jack Crompton, 91, former Manchester United goalkeeper, who also managed Bury.
- 8 July 2013: Dave Hickson, 83, former Everton, Aston Villa, Huddersfield Town, Liverpool, Bury and Tranmere Rovers forward, known as one of few players to represent all three major Merseyside clubs.
- 14 July 2013: George Smith, 92, former Manchester City and Chesterfield inside forward.
- 19 July 2013: Bert Trautmann, 89, former Manchester City goalkeeper, who famously played on in the 1956 FA Cup Final despite suffering a broken neck.
- 19 July 2013: Phil Woosnam, 80, former Wales, Manchester City, Leyton Orient, West Ham United and Aston Villa striker, who also managed the USA.
- 29 July 2013: Christian Benítez, 27, former Ecuador and Birmingham City striker.
- August 2013: Wilf Carter, 79, former West Bromwich Albion, Plymouth Argyle and Exeter City forward.
- 5 August 2013: Malcolm Barrass, 88, former England, Bolton Wanderers and Sheffield United defender.
- 6 August 2013: Steve Aizlewood, 60, former Newport County, Swindon Town and Portsmouth defender.
- 6 August 2013: Dave Wagstaffe, 70, former Manchester City, Wolverhampton Wanderers, Blackburn Rovers and Blackpool winger.
- 7 August 2013: Keith Skillen, 65, former Workington and Hartlepool United striker.
- 13 August 2013: Johnny Hamilton, 78, former Watford midfielder.
- 16 August 2013: John Ryden, 82, former Accrington Stanley, Tottenham Hotspur and Watford centre half.
- 24 August 2013: Gerry Baker, 75, former USA, Manchester City, Ipswich Town and Coventry City forward.
- 28 August 2013: Barry Stobart, 75, former Wolverhampton Wanderers, Manchester City, Aston Villa and Shrewsbury Town forward.
- August 2013: Brian Smith, 57, former Bolton Wanderers, Blackpool, AFC Bournemouth and Bury midfielder.
- 10 September 2013: Barry Hancock, 74, former Port Vale and Crewe Alexandra inside-forward.
- 15 September 2013: Peter Morley, 84, former Crystal Palace chairman.
- 25 September 2013: Ron Fenton, 73, former Burnley, Birmingham City, West Bromwich Albion, Brentford and Notts County inside forward, who also managed Notts County and coached at Nottingham Forest.
- 26 September 2013: Don Donovan, 83, former Republic of Ireland, Everton and Grimsby Town right back.
- 1 October 2013: Peter Broadbent, 80, former England, Brentford, Wolverhampton Wanderers, Shrewsbury Town, Aston Villa and Stockport County midfielder.
- 3 October 2013: Ernie Morgan, 86, former Lincoln City and Gillingham striker.
- 3 October 2013: Laurie Cunningham, 91, former Barnsley and AFC Bournemouth defender.
- 7 October 2013: Mick Buckley, 59, former Everton, Sunderland, Hartlepool United, Carlisle United and Middlesbrough midfielder.
- October 2013: Harold Rudman, 88, former Burnley and Rochdale full back.
- 9 October 2013: Tony Alexander, 78, former Reading forward.
- 19 October 2013: Geoff Smith, 85, former Bradford City goalkeeper.
- 30 October 2013: Ray Mielczarek, 67, former Wales, Wrexham, Huddersfield Town and Rotherham United defender.
- 4 November 2013: Roger Barton, 67, former Lincoln City and Barnsley winger.
- 4 November 2013: Elfed Morris, 71, former Wrexham, Chester City and Halifax Town winger.
- 5 November 2013: Stuart Williams, 83, former Wales, Wrexham, West Bromwich Albion and Southampton full back.
- 6 November 2013: Sammy Taylor, 80, former Preston North End, Carlisle United and Southport winger.
- 7 November 2013: Ron Dellow, 99, former Mansfield Town, Manchester City, Tranmere Rovers and Carlisle United winger.
- 25 November 2013: Bill Foulkes, 81, former Manchester United captain, who survived the 1958 Munich air disaster.
- 12 December 2013: David Jones, 73, former Crewe Alexandra, Birmingham City and Millwall inside forward.
- 24 December 2013: Ron Noades, 76, former Crystal Palace chairman, who also had a spell in charge of Brentford.
- 25 December 2013: Wayne Harrison, 46, former Oldham Athletic striker
- 26 December 2013: Andy Malcolm, 80, former West Ham United, Chelsea and Queens Park Rangers midfielder.
- 29 December 2013: Paul Comstive, 52, former Blackburn Rovers, Wigan Athletic, Wrexham, Burnley, Bolton Wanderers and Chester City midfielder.
- 3 January 2014: Eric Barnes, 76, former Crewe Alexandra centre-half.
- 6 January 2014: Jim Appleby, 79, former Burnley, Blackburn Rovers, Southport and Chester defender.
- 7 January 2014: Roy Warhurst, 87, former Sheffield United, Birmingham City, Manchester City, Crewe Alexandra and Oldham Athletic wing half.
- 10 January 2014: Ian Redford, 53, former Ipswich Town midfielder.
- 13 January 2014: Bobby Collins, 82, former Scotland, Everton, Leeds United, Bury and Oldham Athletic midfielder, who also managed at Huddersfield Town, Hull City and Barnsley.
- 14 January 2014: Alan Blackburn, 78, former West Ham United and Halifax Town forward.
- 18 January 2014: Andy Graver, 86, former Newcastle United, Lincoln City, Leicester City and Stoke City forward.
- 19 January 2014: Bert Williams, 93, former England, Walsall and Wolverhampton Wanderers goalkeeper.
- 22 January 2014: Arthur Bellamy, 71, former Burnley and Chesterfield inside forward.
- 27 January 2014: Brian Gibbs, 77, former AFC Bournemouth, Gillingham and Colchester United inside left.
- 1 February 2014: Tony Hateley, 72, former Notts County, Aston Villa, Chelsea, Liverpool, Coventry City, Birmingham City and Oldham Athletic striker.
- 2 February 2014: Nigel Walker, 54, former Newcastle United, Crewe Alexandra, Sunderland, Chester City and Hartlepool United midfielder.
- 6 February 2014: Tommy Dixon, 84, former West Ham United, Reading, Brighton & Hove Albion, Workington and Barrow forward.
- 10 February 2014: Gordon Harris, 73, former England, Burnley and Sunderland midfielder.
- 12 February 2014: John Poppitt, 91, former Chesterfield, Derby County and Queens Park Rangers right back.
- 14 February 2014: Sir Tom Finney, 91, former England and Preston North End winger.
- 18 February 2014: Arthur Rowley, 80, former Liverpool, Wrexham and Crewe Alexandra forward.
- 26 February 2014: Gordon Nutt, 81, former Coventry City, Cardiff City, Arsenal and Southend United winger.
- 3 March 2014: Stan Rickaby, 89, former England, Middlesbrough and West Bromwich Albion right back.
- 7 March 2014: Bob Charles, 72, former Southampton goalkeeper.
- 9 March 2014: John Christie, 84, former Southampton and Walsall goalkeeper.
- 10 March 2014: Vince Radcliffe, 68, former Portsmouth, Peterborough United and Rochdale defender.
- 11 March 2014: Wilf Dixon, 94, former Aldershot wing half, who is best known for coaching spells with Southend United, West Bromwich Albion, Blackpool, Everton and Hull City
- 12 March 2014: Calvin Palmer, 73, former Nottingham Forest, Stoke City, Sunderland and Crewe Alexandra midfielder.
- 14 March 2014: Alec Gaskell, 81, former Southport, Newcastle United, Mansfield Town and Tranmere Rovers striker.
- March 2014: Dennis Jackson, 82, former Aston Villa and Millwall full back.
- 22 March 2014: Ken Plant, 88, former Bury and Colchester United centre forward.
- 24 March 2014: Bryan Orritt, 77, former Birmingham City and Middlesbrough inside forward.
- 30 March 2014: Fred Stansfield, 96, former Wales, Cardiff City and Newport County defender.
- 5 April 2014: Gordon Smith, 59, former Aston Villa, Tottenham Hotspur and Wolverhampton Wanderers full back.
- 5 April 2014: Andy Davidson, 81, former Hull City right back.
- 8 April 2014: Sandy Brown, 75, former Everton, Shrewsbury Town and Southport left back.
- April 2014: Dave Blakey, 84, former Chesterfield centre-half.
- 11 April 2014: Rolando Ugolini, 89, former Middlesbrough and Wrexham goalkeeper.
- 14 April 2014: Peter Ellson, 88, former Crewe Alexandra goalkeeper.
- 16 April 2014: Frank Kopel, 65, former Manchester United and Blackburn Rovers left back.
- 18 April 2014: Dylan Tombides, 20, former West Ham United striker.
- 1 May 2014: Clive Clark, 73, former Queens Park Rangers, West Bromwich Albion, Preston North End and Southport winger.
- May 2014: Terry Farmer, 82, former Rotherham United, York City and Scarborough striker.
- 9 May 2014: Len Mahoney, 92, former English Football Referee.
- 15 May 2014: Geoff Richards, 85, former West Bromwich Albion F.C. winger.
- 28 May 2014: Stan Crowther, 78, former Aston Villa, Manchester United, Chelsea and Brighton & Hove Albion wing half
- May 2014: Terry Bell, 69, former Hartlepool United, Reading and Aldershot midfielder.
- 31 May 2014: Jack Casley, 88, former Torquay United and Headington United midfielder.

== Retirements ==
- 6 June 2013: Benni McCarthy, 35, former South Africa, Blackburn Rovers and West Ham United striker.
- 8 June 2013: Phil Neville, 36, former Manchester United, Everton and England defender.
- 11 June 2013: Mido, 30, former Egypt, Tottenham Hotspur, Middlesbrough, Wigan Athletic, West Ham United and Barnsley striker.
- 21 June 2013: Neil Harris, 35, former Millwall, Nottingham Forest and Southend United striker.
- 25 July 2013: Leigh Bromby, 33, former Sheffield Wednesday, Sheffield United, Watford and Leeds United defender.
- 31 July 2013: Kieron Dyer, 34, former England, Ipswich Town, Newcastle United, West Ham United, Queens Park Rangers and Middlesbrough midfielder.
- 8 August 2013: Louis Saha, 35, former France, Fulham, Manchester United, Everton, Tottenham Hotspur and Sunderland striker.
- 12 August 2013: Doni, 33, former Brazil and Liverpool goalkeeper.
- 25 August 2013: Robin Hulbert, 33, former Swindon Town, Bristol City, Port Vale and Darlington midfielder.
- 26 August 2013: Deco, 35, former Portugal, Corinthians, Alverca, Salgueiros, Porto, Barcelona, Chelsea and Fluminense midfielder.
- 4 September 2013: Thomas Hitzlsperger, 31, former Germany, Aston Villa, West Ham United and Everton midfielder.
- 27 September 2013: Grétar Steinsson, 31, former Iceland and Bolton Wanderers defender.
- 2 October 2013: Michael Duberry, 37, former Chelsea, Leeds United, Stoke City, Reading, Wycombe Wanderers and Oxford United defender.
- 11 October 2013: Rob Edwards, 30, former Wales, Aston Villa, Wolverhampton Wanderers, Blackpool and Barnsley defender.
- 16 October 2013: Rob Hulse, 33, former Crewe Alexandra, West Bromwich Albion, Leeds United, Sheffield United, Derby County and Queens Park Rangers forward.
- 16 October 2013: Garry Richards, 27, former Colchester United, Southend United and Gillingham defender.
- 25 October 2013: Adam Virgo, 30, former Brighton & Hove Albion, Yeovil Town and Bristol Rovers defender.
- 3 December 2013: David Healy, 34, former Northern Ireland, Manchester United, Preston North End, Leeds United, Fulham, Sunderland and Bury forward.
- 5 December 2013: Richard Cresswell, 36, former York City, Sheffield Wednesday, Leicester City, Preston North End, Leeds United, Stoke City and Sheffield United forward.
- 16 December 2013: Rory Delap, 37, former Republic of Ireland, Carlisle United, Derby County, Southampton. Sunderland, Stoke City and Burton Albion midfielder.
- 23 December 2013: Mark Creighton, 32, former Oxford United, Wrexham, defender.
- 31 December 2013: Jeff Smith, 33, former Hartlepool United, Bolton Wanderers, Port Vale, Carlisle United and Darlington midfielder.
- 8 January 2014: Danny Higginbotham, 35, former Gibraltar, Manchester United, Derby County, Southampton, Sunderland, Stoke City and Sheffield United defender
- 14 January 2014: Luis García, 35, former Spain and Liverpool winger.
- 18 January 2014: Brett Emerton, 34, former Australia and Blackburn Rovers midfielder.
- 5 February 2014: Mile Sterjovski, 34, former Australia and Derby County midfielder.
- 3 March 2014: David Murphy, 30, former Middlesbrough and Birmingham City left back.
- 20 March 2014: Jason Roberts, 36, former Grenada, Wolverhampton Wanderers, Bristol Rovers, West Bromwich Albion, Wigan Athletic, Blackburn Rovers and Reading forward.
- 8 April 2014: Michael Bridges, 35, former Sunderland, Leeds United, Bristol City, Carlisle United, Hull City and Milton Keynes Dons striker.
- 30 April 2014: Phil Picken, 28, former Chesterfield and Bury defender.
- May 2014: Harry Kewell, 35, former Australia, Leeds United and Liverpool midfielder.
- May 2014: Jacob Burns, 35, former Australia, Leeds United and Barnsley midfielder.
- 3 May 2014: Kevin Phillips, 40, former England, Watford, Sunderland, Southampton, Aston Villa, West Bromwich Albion, Birmingham City, Blackpool, Crystal Palace and Leicester City striker.
- 3 May 2014: Chris Shuker, 31, former Manchester City, Barnsley, Tranmere Rovers, Morecambe, and Port Vale midfielder.
- 6 May 2014: Richard Hughes, 34, former Scotland, AFC Bournemouth and Portsmouth midfielder.
- 6 May 2014: Wayne Bridge, 33, former England, Southampton, Chelsea, Manchester City and Reading left back.
- 14 May 2014: Park Ji-sung, 33, former South Korea, Manchester United, and Queens Park Rangers midfielder.
- 19 May 2014: Ryan Giggs, 40, former Wales and Manchester United winger; record appearance holder for his club and won 22 major trophies as a player, more than any other footballer in the history of English football.
- 19 May 2014: Stephen Purches, 34, former AFC Bournemouth and Leyton Orient defender.
- 22 May 2014: Craig Bellamy, 34, former Wales, Norwich City, Coventry City, Newcastle United, Blackburn Rovers, Liverpool, West Ham United, Manchester City and Cardiff City forward.
