= Moldova national football team results (2010–2019) =

- Win Draw Loss

The Moldova national football team represents Moldova in association football and is controlled by the Federația Moldovenească de Fotbal (FMF), the governing body of the sport in the country. It competes as a member of the Union of European Football Associations (UEFA), which encompasses the countries of Europe.

The team's largest victory came on 18 August 1992 when they defeated Pakistan by five goals to nil. Their worst loss is 8–0 against Denmark in 2021. Alexandru Epureanu holds the appearance record for Moldova, having been capped 91 times since his first match in 2006. The goalscoring record is held by Serghei Cleșcenco, who scored eleven times in 69 matches. As of July 2019, Moldova are ranked 171st in the FIFA World Rankings. Its highest ever ranking of 37th was achieved in April 2008.

Moldova's first match of the 2010s was a 1–0 victory against Kazakhstan in a friendly. The team completed four qualification campaigns between 2010 and 2019, for UEFA Euro 2012, 2014 FIFA World Cup, UEFA Euro 2016 and 2018 FIFA World Cup; they failed to qualify in each. Between 2010 and 2019, the team played 93 matches and their record is 16 wins, 23 draws and 54 losses.

== Matches ==
=== 2010 ===
3 March Friendly	Kazakhstan	0–1	Moldova	Antalya, Turkey
19:00 (UTC+2)		Report	Epureanu 64'	Stadium: Atatürk Stadium; Attendance: 500; Referee: Vladislav Bezborodov (Russia)

26 May Friendly	Azerbaijan	1–1	Moldova	Seekirchen, Austria
18:30 (UTC+2)	Mammadov 21'	Report	Cojocari 81'	Stadium: Sportzentrum Seekirchen; Attendance: 200; Referee: Gerald Lehner (Austria)

29 May Friendly	United Arab Emirates	3–2	Moldova	Anif, Austria
19:00 (UTC+2)	Jumaa 5'; Al Shehhi 32'; Khalil 89'	Report Report	Ţîgîrlaş 14'; Bulgaru 80'	Stadium: Sportzentrum Anif; Attendance: 300; Referee: Robert Schörgenhofer (Austria)

11 August Friendly	Moldova	0–0	Georgia	Chișinău, Moldova
18:00 (UTC+3)		Report		Stadium: Stadionul Zimbru; Attendance: 5,000; Referee: Viktor Shvetsov (Ukraine)

3 September UEFA Euro 2012 qualifying	Moldova	2–0	Finland	Chișinău, Moldova
19:30 (UTC+3)	Suvorov 69'; Doroş 74'	Report		Stadium: Stadionul Zimbru; Attendance: 10,300; Referee: Robert Małek (Poland)

7 September UEFA Euro 2012 qualifying	Hungary	2–1	Moldova	Budapest, Hungary
20:30 (UTC+2)	Rudolf 50'; Koman 66'	Report	Suvorov 79'	Stadium: Szusza Ferenc Stadium; Attendance: 9,209; Referee: Libor Kovařík (Czech Republic)

8 October UEFA Euro 2012 qualifying	Moldova	0–1	Netherlands	Chișinău, Moldova
21:30 (UTC+3)		Report	Huntelaar 37'	Stadium: Stadionul Zimbru; Attendance: 10,500; Referee: Florian Meyer (Germany)

12 October UEFA Euro 2012 qualifying	San Marino	0–2	Moldova	Serravalle, San Marino
20:30 (UTC+2)		Report	Josan 20'; Doroş 86' (pen.)	Stadium: Stadio Olimpico; Attendance: 714; Referee: Mark Courtney (Northern Ireland)

=== 2011 ===
6 February Friendly	Moldova	0–1	Poland	Vila Real de Santo António, Portugal
20:30 (UTC+0)		Report	Plizga 15'	Stadium: Estádio Municipal; Attendance: 250; Referee: Ivo dos Anjos (Portugal)

9 February Friendly	Moldova	2–1	Andorra	Lagos, Portugal
14:00 (UTC+0)	Picuşceac 66'; Bugaiov 90'	Report	García 52'	Stadium: Estádio Municipal; Attendance: 100; Referee: Sérgio Lopes (Portugal)

29 March UEFA Euro 2012 qualifying	Sweden	2–1	Moldova	Solna, Sweden
19:00 (UTC+2)	Lustig 30'; Larsson 82'	Report	Suvorov 90'	Stadium: Råsunda Stadium; Attendance: 25,544; Referee: Knut Kircher (Germany)

3 June UEFA Euro 2012 qualifying	Moldova	1–4	Sweden	Chișinău, Moldova
21:30 (UTC+3)	Bugaiov 61'	Report	Toivonen 11'; Elmander 30', 58'; Gerndt 88'	Stadium: Stadionul Zimbru; Attendance: 10,500; Referee: Andre Marriner (England)

10 August Friendly	Cyprus	3–2	Moldova	Nicosia, Cyprus
18:00 (UTC+3)	Avraam 13', 52'; Dobrašinović 89'	Report	Suvorov 23'; Ovseannicov 45'	Stadium: GSP Stadium; Attendance: 2,000; Referee: Milorad Mažić (Serbia)

2 September UEFA Euro 2012 qualifying	Finland	4–1	Moldova	Helsinki, Finland
18:30 (UTC+3)	Hämäläinen 11', 43'; Forssell 52' (pen.); Armaş 71' (o.g.)	Report	Alexeev 85'	Stadium: Olympic Stadium; Attendance: 9,056; Referee: Anastassios Kakos (Greece)

6 September UEFA Euro 2012 qualifying	Moldova	0–2	Hungary	Chișinău, Moldova
20:45 (UTC+3)		Report	Vanczák 7'; Rudolf 83'	Stadium: Stadionul Zimbru; Attendance: 10,500; Referee: Ivan Bebek (Croatia)

7 October UEFA Euro 2012 qualifying	Netherlands	1–0	Moldova	Rotterdam, Netherlands
20:30 (UTC+2)	Huntelaar 40'	Report		Stadium: De Kuip; Attendance: 47,226; Referee: Matej Jug (Slovenia)

11 October UEFA Euro 2012 qualifying	Moldova	4–0	San Marino	Chișinău, Moldova
21:00 (UTC+3)	Zmeu 30'; Bacciocchi 61' (o.g.); Suvorov 66'; Andronic 87'	Report		Stadium: Stadionul Zimbru; Attendance: 6,534; Referee: Petur Reinert (Faroe Islands)

11 November Friendly	Georgia	2–0	Moldova	Tbilisi, Georgia
18:00 (UTC+4)	Kobakhidze 36'; Kobakhidze 39' (pen.)	Report		Stadium: Mikheil Meskhi Stadium; Attendance: 4,000; Referee: Vüsal Oliyev (Azerbaijan)

=== 2012 ===
29 February Friendly	Belarus	0–0	Moldova	Antalya, Turkey
17:00 (UTC+2)		Report		Stadium: Mardan Sports Complex; Attendance: 100; Referee: Gediminas Mažeika (Lithuania)

23 May Friendly	Venezuela	4–0	Moldova	Puerto Ordaz, Venezuela
19:30 (UTC-4:30)	Seijas 45'; Rondón 50', 73'; Vizcarrondo 53'	Report Report		Stadium: Polideportivo Cachamay; Attendance: 20,000; Referee: Henry Gambetta (Peru)

26 May Friendly	El Salvador	2–0	Moldova	Dallas, United States
17:45 (UTC-5)	Bonilla 15'; Alas 23'	Report Report		Stadium: Cotton Bowl Stadium; Attendance: 35,000; Referee: Paul Ward (Canada)

15 August Friendly	Albania	0–0	Moldova	Tirana, Albania
20:30 (UTC+2)		Report		Stadium: Qemal Stafa Stadium; Attendance: 8,000; Referee: Yunus Yıldırım (Turkey)

7 September 2014 FIFA World Cup qualifying	Moldova	0–5	England	Chișinău, Moldova
21:45 (UTC+3)		Report	Lampard 4' (pen.), 29'; Defoe 32'; Milner 74'; Baines 83'	Stadium: Stadionul Zimbru; Attendance: 10,500; Referee: Pol van Boekel (Netherlands)

11 September 2014 FIFA World Cup qualifying	Poland	2–0	Moldova	Wrocław, Poland
20:45 (UTC+2)	Błaszczykowski 33' (pen.); Wawrzyniak 81'	Report		Stadium: Stadion Miejski; Attendance: 26,145; Referee: Ilias Spathas (Greece)

12 October 2014 FIFA World Cup qualifying	Moldova	0–0	Ukraine	Chișinău, Moldova
21:00 (UTC+3)		Report		Stadium: Stadionul Zimbru; Attendance: 12,500; Referee: Clément Turpin (France)

16 October 2014 FIFA World Cup qualifying	San Marino	0–2	Moldova	Serravalle, San Marino
20:30 (UTC+2)		Report	Dadu 72' (pen.); Epureanu 78'	Stadium: Stadio Olimpico; Attendance: 736; Referee: Marios Panayi (Cyprus)

=== 2013 ===
6 February Friendly	Kazakhstan	3–1	Moldova	Antalya, Turkey
17:00 (UTC+2)	Dmitrenko 33'; Dzholchiev 59', 90'	Report	Doroş 86'	Stadium: Mardan Sports Complex; Attendance: 100; Referee: Hüseyin Göçek (Turkey)

22 March 2014 FIFA World Cup qualifying	Moldova	0–1	Montenegro	Chișinău, Moldova
21:30 (UTC+2)		Report	Vučinić 78'	Stadium: Stadionul Zimbru; Attendance: 5,400; Referee: Daniele Orsato (Italy)

26 March 2014 FIFA World Cup qualifying	Ukraine	2–1	Moldova	Odesa, Ukraine
21:00 (UTC+2)	Yarmolenko 61'; Khacheridi 70'; Stepanenko (red card) 90+2'	Report	Suvorov 80'	Stadium: Chornomorets Stadium; Attendance: 31,948; Referee: Kenn Hansen (Denmark)

7 June 2014 FIFA World Cup qualifying	Moldova	1–1	Poland	Chișinău, Moldova
21:15 (UTC+3)	Sidorenco 37'	Report	Błaszczykowski 7'	Stadium: Stadionul Zimbru; Attendance: 8,726; Referee: Fernando Teixeira Vitienes (Spain)

14 June Friendly	Moldova	2–1	Kyrgyzstan	Tiraspol, Moldova
20:00 (UTC+3)	Sidorenco 30', 78'	Report	Kharchenko 58'	Stadium: Stadionul Sheriff (Arena Mică); Attendance: 3,500; Referee: Oleksandr Derdo (Ukraine)

14 August Friendly	Moldova	1–1	Andorra	Chișinău, Moldova
19:00 (UTC+2)	Dedov 42'	Report	Sonejee 16'	Stadium: Stadionul Zimbru; Attendance: 4,724; Referee: Yaroslav Kozyk (Ukraine)

6 September 2014 FIFA World Cup qualifying	England	4–0	Moldova	London, England
20:00 (UTC+1)	Gerrard 12'; Lambert 26'; Welbeck 45', 50'	Report; Report		Stadium: Wembley Stadium; Attendance: 61,607; Referee: Ivan Kružliak (Slovakia)

11 October 2014 FIFA World Cup qualifying	Moldova	3–0	San Marino	Chișinău, Moldova
19:00 (UTC+3)	Frunză 55'; Sidorenco 59', 89'	Report		Stadium: Stadionul Zimbru; Attendance: 7,348; Referee: Ignasi Villamayor Rozados (Andorra)

15 October 2014 FIFA World Cup qualifying	Montenegro	2–5	Moldova	Podgorica, Montenegro
21:00 (UTC+2)	Jovetić 55', 90'	Report	Antoniuc 28', 89'; Armaș 62'; Sidorenco 64'; Ioniță 73'	Stadium: Podgorica City Stadium; Attendance: 5,770; Referee: Robert Schörgenhofer (Austria)

18 November Friendly	Moldova	1–1	Lithuania	Chișinău, Moldova
19:00 (UTC+2)	Ioniță 72'	Report	Kalonas 39'	Stadium: Stadionul Zimbru; Attendance: 4,794; Referee: Alexandru Tudor (Romania)

=== 2014 ===
15 January Friendly	Moldova	1–2	Norway	Abu Dhabi, United Arab Emirates
20:00 (UTC+4)	Posmac 29'	Report 1 Report 2	Kamara 45+2'; de Lanlay 67'	Stadium: Mohammed Bin Zayed Stadium; Attendance: 100; Referee: Fahad Al Kassar Banihammad (United Arab Emirates)

17 January Friendly	Moldova	1–2	Sweden	Abu Dhabi, United Arab Emirates
19:00 (UTC+4)	Luvannor 45+1'	Report; Report 2	Fejzullahu 77', 86'	Stadium: Mohammed Bin Zayed Stadium; Attendance: 100; Referee: Jameel Abdulhusin (Bahrain)

20 January Friendly	Moldova	0–1	Poland	Abu Dhabi, United Arab Emirates
19:15 (UTC+4)		Report; Report 2	Brożek 10'	Stadium: Mohammed Bin Zayed Stadium; Attendance: 200; Referee: Saleh Al Hathlool (Saudi Arabia)

5 March Friendly	Andorra	0–3	Moldova	Andorra la Vella, Andorra
18:00 (UTC+2)		Report	Epureanu 13', 62'; Luvannor 22'	Stadium: Estadi Comunal d'Andorra la Vella; Attendance: 200; Referee: Alan Mario Sant (Malta)

24 May Friendly	Saudi Arabia	0–4	Moldova	Jerez de la Frontera, Spain
18:00 (UTC+2)		Report	Armaș 8'; Picușceac 32' (pen.); Alexeev 34'; Gațcan 53'	Stadium: Estadio Municipal de Chapín; Attendance: 800; Referee: Alejandro Hernández (Spain)

27 May Friendly	Canada	1–1	Moldova	Mauer bei Amstetten, Austria
17:30 (UTC+2)	Ricketts 8'	Report	Sidorenco 7'	Stadium: Sportplatz S.V. Union; Attendance: 1,000; Referee: Oliver Drachta (Austria)

7 June Friendly	Cameroon	1–0	Moldova	Yaoundé, Cameroon
15:00 (UTC+1)	Salli 30'	Report		Stadium: Stade Ahmadou Ahidjo; Attendance: 45,000; Referee: Lazard Tsiba Kamba (Congo)

3 September Friendly	Ukraine	1–0	Moldova	Kyiv, Ukraine
20:00 (UTC+3)	Bezus 63'	Report		Stadium: Olimpiyskiy National Sports Complex; Attendance: 8,500; Referee: István Kovács (Romania)

8 September UEFA Euro 2016 qualifying	Montenegro	2–0	Moldova	Podgorica, Montenegro
20:45 (UTC+2)	Vučinić 45+2'; Tomašević 73'	Report		Stadium: Podgorica City Stadium; Attendance: 8,759; Referee: Aleksei Kulbakov (Belarus)

9 October UEFA Euro 2016 qualifying	Moldova	1–2	Austria	Chișinău, Moldova
21:45 (UTC+3)	Dedov 27' (pen.)	Report	Alaba 12' (pen.); Janko 51'	Stadium: Stadionul Zimbru; Attendance: 9,381; Referee: Jorge Sousa (Portugal)

12 October UEFA Euro 2016 qualifying	Russia	1–1	Moldova	Moscow, Russia
20:00 (UTC+4)	Dzyuba 73' (pen.)	Report	Epureanu 74'	Stadium: Otkrytiye Arena; Attendance: 30,017; Referee: Kristinn Jakobsson (Iceland)

15 November UEFA Euro 2016 qualifying	Moldova	0–1	Liechtenstein	Chișinău, Moldova
19:00 (UTC+2)		Report	Burgmeier 74'	Stadium: Stadionul Zimbru; Attendance: 6,843; Referee: Mattias Gestranius (Finland)

=== 2015 ===
14 February Unofficial Friendly	Romania	2–1	Moldova	Aksu, Turkey
17:00 (UTC+2)	Popa 21'; Lazăr 86'	Report	Carp 9'	Stadium: Mardan Sports Complex; Attendance: 150; Referee: Mikhail Vilkov (Russia)

18 February Friendly	Kazakhstan	1–1	Moldova	Aksu, Turkey
18:00 (UTC+2)	Shchetkin 48'	Report	Gaţcan 54'	Stadium: Mardan Sports Complex; Attendance: 100; Referee: Aleksei Nikolaev (Russia)

27 March UEFA Euro 2016 qualifying	Moldova	0–2	Sweden	Chișinău, Moldova
21:45 (UTC+2)		Report	Ibrahimović 46', 84' (pen.)	Stadium: Stadionul Zimbru; Attendance: 10,375; Referee: Ivan Bebek (Croatia)

9 June Friendly	Luxembourg	0–0	Moldova	Luxembourg City, Luxembourg
19:00 (UTC+2)		Report		Stadium: Stade Josy Barthel; Attendance: 1,122; Referee: Daniel Siebert (Germany)

14 June UEFA Euro 2016 qualifying	Liechtenstein	1–1	Moldova	Vaduz, Liechtenstein
18:00 (UTC+2)	Wieser 20'	Report	Boghiu 43'	Stadium: Rheinpark Stadion; Attendance: 2,080; Referee: Libor Kovařík (Czech Republic)

5 September UEFA Euro 2016 qualifying	Austria	1–0	Moldova	Vienna, Austria
20:45 (UTC+2)	Junuzović 52'	Report		Stadium: Ernst-Happel-Stadion; Attendance: 48,500; Referee: Aleksandar Stavrev (Macedonia)

8 September UEFA Euro 2016 qualifying	Moldova	0–2	Montenegro	Chișinău, Moldova
21:45 (UTC+3)		Report	Savić 9'; Racu 65' (o.g.)	Stadium: Stadionul Zimbru; Attendance: 6,243; Referee: Sébastien Delferière (Belgium)

9 October UEFA Euro 2016 qualifying	Moldova	1–2	Russia	Chișinău, Moldova
21:45 (UTC+3)	Cebotaru 85'	Report	Ignashevich 58'; Dzyuba 78'	Stadium: Stadionul Zimbru; Attendance: 10,244; Referee: Michael Koukoulakis (Greece)

12 October UEFA Euro 2016 qualifying	Sweden	2–0	Moldova	Solna, Sweden
18:00 (UTC+2)	Ibrahimović 23'; Zengin 47'	Report		Stadium: Friends Arena; Attendance: 25,351; Referee: Luca Banti (Italy)

17 November Friendly	Azerbaijan	2–1	Moldova	Baku, Azerbaijan
21:00 (UTC+4)	Carp 32' (o.g.); Ramazanov 50'	Report	Antoniuc 44'	Stadium: Baku National Stadium; Attendance: 10,000; Referee: Lasha Silagava (Georgia)

=== 2016 ===
24 March Friendly	Malta	0–0	Moldova	Ta' Qali, Malta
15:00 (UTC+1)		Report		Stadium: Ta' Qali National Stadium; Attendance: 500; Referee: Roomer Tarajev (Estonia)

28 March Friendly	Andorra	0–1	Moldova	Ta' Qali, Malta
17:00 (UTC+2)		Report	Armaș 45+2'	Stadium: Ta' Qali National Stadium; Attendance: 50; Referee: Johnny Casanova (San Marino)

27 May Friendly	Croatia	1–0	Moldova	Koprivnica, Croatia
20:30 (UTC+2)	Kramarić 9'	Report		Stadium: Gradski stadion Attendance: 4,500; Referee: Ognjen Valjić (Bosnia and Herzegovina)

3 June Friendly	Switzerland	2–1	Moldova	Lugano, Switzerland
18:00 (UTC+2)	Namaşco 12' (o.g.); Mehmedi 75'	Report	Gînsari 69'	Stadium: Cornaredo Stadium; Attendance: 5,700; Referee: Alejandro Hernández (Spain)

5 September 2018 FIFA World Cup qualifying	Wales	4–0	Moldova	Cardiff, Wales
19:45 (UTC+1)	Vokes 38'; Allen 44'; Bale 51', 90+5' (pen.)	Report		Stadium: Cardiff City Stadium; Attendance: 31,731; Referee: Liran Liany (Israel)

6 October 2018 FIFA World Cup qualifying	Moldova	0–3	Serbia	Chișinău, Moldova
21:45 (UTC+3)		Report	Kostić 19'; Ivanović 37'; Tadić 59'	Stadium: Stadionul Zimbru; Attendance: 6,192; Referee: Aleksei Kulbakov (Belarus)

9 October 2018 FIFA World Cup qualifying	Moldova	1–3	Republic of Ireland	Chișinău, Moldova
21:45 (UTC+3)	Bugaiov 45+1'	Report	Long 2'; McClean 69', 76'	Stadium: Stadionul Zimbru; Attendance: 6,089; Referee: Jakob Kehlet (Denmark)

12 November 2018 FIFA World Cup qualifying	Georgia	1–1	Moldova	Tbilisi, Georgia
21:00 (UTC+4)	Qazaishvili 16'	Report	Gațcan 78'	Stadium: Boris Paichadze Dinamo Arena; Attendance: 40,642; Referee: Georgi Kabakov (Bulgaria)

=== 2017 ===
17 January Friendly	Qatar	1–1	Moldova	Doha, Qatar
19:00 (UTC+3)	Soria 3'	Report	Cojocari 24'	Stadium: Jassim Bin Hamad Stadium; Attendance: 80; Referee: Omar Al Yaqoubi (Oman)

19 March Friendly	San Marino	0–2	Moldova	Serravalle, San Marino
18:00 (UTC+1)		Report	Posmac 26'; Gațcan 72'	Stadium: San Marino Stadium; Attendance: 100; Referee: Paolo Valeri (Italy)

24 March 2018 FIFA World Cup qualifying	Austria	2–0	Moldova	Vienna, Austria
20:45 (UTC+1)	Arnautović 75'; Harnik 90'	Report		Stadium: Ernst-Happel-Stadion; Attendance: 21,000; Referee: István Vad (Hungary)

27 March Friendly	Turkey	3–1	Moldova	Eskişehir, Turkey
19:15 (UTC+3)	Mor 14'; Çalık 24'; Ünder 52'	Report	Gînsari 90+1'	Stadium: Eskişehir Stadium; Attendance: 34,930; Referee: Genc Nuza (Kosovo)

6 June Friendly	Israel	1–1	Moldova	Netanya, Israel
20:30 (UTC+3)	Sahar 90+5' (pen.)	Report	Gînsari 51'	Stadium: Netanya Stadium; Attendance: 5,040; Referee: Bastian Dankert (Germany)

11 June 2018 FIFA World Cup qualifying	Moldova	2–2	Georgia	Chișinău, Moldova
19:00 (UTC+3)	Gînsari 15'; Dedov 36'	Report	Merebashvili 65'; Qazaishvili 70'	Stadium: Stadionul Zimbru; Attendance: 4,803; Referee: Andreas Ekberg (Sweden)

2 September 2018 FIFA World Cup qualifying	Serbia	3–0	Moldova	Belgrade, Serbia
18:00 (UTC+2)	Gaćinović 20'; Kolarov 30'; Mitrović 81'	Report		Stadium: Partizan Stadium; Attendance: 9,974; Referee: Tamás Bognár (Hungary)

5 September 2018 FIFA World Cup qualifying	Moldova	0–2	Wales	Chișinău, Moldova
21:45 (UTC+3)		Report	Robson-Kanu 80'; Ramsey 90+3'	Stadium: Stadionul Zimbru; Attendance: 10,272; Referee: Paweł Raczkowski (Poland)

6 October 2018 FIFA World Cup qualifying	Republic of Ireland	2–0	Moldova	Dublin, Republic of Ireland
19:45 (UTC+1)	Murphy 2', 19'	Report		Stadium: Aviva Stadium; Attendance: 50,560; Referee: Bas Nijhuis (Netherlands)

9 October 2018 FIFA World Cup qualifying	Moldova	0–1	Austria	Chișinău, Moldova
21:45 (UTC+3)		Report	Schaub 69'	Stadium: Stadionul Zimbru; Attendance: 5,000; Referee: Bart Vertenten (Belgium)

=== 2018 ===
27 January Friendly	South Korea	1–0	Moldova	Aksu, Turkey
15:00 (UTC+2)	Kim Shin-wook 67'	Report (Soccerway)		Stadium: Mardan Sports Complex; Attendance: 1,000; Referee: Alper Ulusoy (Turkey)

30 January Friendly	Azerbaijan	0–0	Moldova	Aksu, Turkey
20:00 (UTC+2)		Report (Soccerway)		Stadium: Mardan Sports Complex; Attendance: 300; Referee: Hüseyin Göçek (Turkey)

26 February Friendly	Saudi Arabia	3–0	Moldova	Jeddah, Saudi Arabia
20:30 (UTC+3)	Hawsawi 10'; Al-Jassim 57'; Assiri 88'	(Soccerway)		Stadium: King Abdullah Sports City; Attendance: 6,914; Referee: Paweł Gil (Poland)

27 March Friendly	Ivory Coast	2–1	Moldova	Beauvais, France
21:00 (UTC+2)	Assalé 20'; Pépé 44'	Report (Soccerway)	Ioniţă 59'	Stadium: Stade Pierre Brisson; Attendance: 2,000; Referee: Genc Nuza (Kosovo)

31 May Friendly	Moldova	Not played	Congo	Kufstein, Austria
17:00 (UTC+2)				Stadium: Kufstein Arena

4 June Friendly	Armenia	0–0	Moldova	Kematen in Tirol, Austria
17:00 (UTC+2)		Report		Stadium: Sportplatz Kematen; Attendance: 50; Referee: Manfred Schüttengruber (Austria)

8 September 2018–19 UEFA Nations League D	Luxembourg	4–0	Moldova	Luxembourg City, Luxembourg
20:45 (UTC+2)	Malget 34'; Thill 60'; Sinani 75'; Martins 83'	Report (UEFA)		Stadium: Stade Josy Barthel; Attendance: 2,956; Referee: Rob Harvey (Republic of Ireland)

11 September 2018–19 UEFA Nations League D	Moldova	0–0	Belarus	Chișinău, Moldova
21:45 (UTC+3)		Report (UEFA)		Stadium: Stadionul Zimbru; Attendance: 4,942; Referee: Mario Zebec (Croatia)

12 October 2018–19 UEFA Nations League D	Moldova	2–0	San Marino	Chișinău, Moldova
21:45 (UTC+3)	Gînsari 31', 67'	Report (UEFA)		Stadium: Stadionul Zimbru; Attendance: 5,242; Referee: Bryn Markham-Jones (Wales)

15 October 2018–19 UEFA Nations League D	Belarus	0–0	Moldova	Minsk, Belarus
21:45 (UTC+3)		Report (UEFA)		Stadium: Dinamo Stadium; Attendance: 10,870; Referee: Kevin Clancy (Scotland)

15 November 2018–19 UEFA Nations League D	San Marino	0–1	Moldova	Serravalle, San Marino
20:45 (UTC+1)		Report (UEFA)	Damașcan 78'	Stadium: San Marino Stadium; Attendance: 747; Referee: Georgios Kominis (Greece)

18 November 2018–19 UEFA Nations League D	Moldova	1–1	Luxembourg	Chișinău, Moldova
19:00 (UTC+2)	Gînsari 58' (pen.)	Report (UEFA)	Bensi 70'	Stadium: Stadionul Zimbru; Attendance: 4,642; Referee: Adrien Jaccottet (Switzerland)

=== 2019 ===
21 February Friendly	Kazakhstan	1–0	Moldova	Kumköy, Turkey
17:00 (UTC+3)	Omirtayev 61'	Report		Stadium: Futbol Kampı Titanic Deluxe Belek; Attendance: 500; Referee: Manfredas Lukjančukas (Lithuania)

22 March UEFA Euro 2020 qualifying	Moldova	1–4	France	Chișinău, Moldova
20:45 (UTC+1)	Ambros 89'	Report (UEFA)	Griezmann 24'; Varane 27'; Giroud 36'; Mbappé 87'	Stadium: Stadionul Zimbru; Attendance: 13,000; Referee: Aleksandar Stavrev (Macedonia)

25 March UEFA Euro 2020 qualifying	Turkey	4–0	Moldova	Eskişehir, Turkey
20:00 (UTC+3)	Kaldırım 24'; Tosun 26', 53'; Ayhan 70'	Report (UEFA)		Stadium: Eskişehir Stadium; Attendance: 29,456; Referee: Serhiy Boyko (Ukraine)

8 June UEFA Euro 2020 qualifying	Moldova	1–0	Andorra	Chișinău, Moldova
19:00 (UTC+3)	Armaș 8'	Report (UEFA)		Stadium: Stadionul Zimbru; Attendance: 5,000; Referee: Bojan Pandžić (Sweden)

11 June UEFA Euro 2020 qualifying	Albania	2–0	Moldova	Elbasan, Albania
20:45 (UTC+2)	Cikalleshi 66'; Ramadani 90+3'	Report (UEFA)		Stadium: Elbasan Arena; Attendance: 5,004; Referee: Ville Nevalainen (Finland)

7 September UEFA Euro 2020 qualifying	Iceland	3–0	Moldova	Reykjavík, Iceland
16:00 (UTC+0)	Sigþórsson 31'; Bjarnason 55'; Mudrac 77' (o.g.)	Report (UEFA)		Stadium: Laugardalsvöllur; Attendance: 8,338; Referee: João Pinheiro (Portugal)

10 September UEFA Euro 2020 qualifying	Moldova	0–4	Turkey	Chișinău, Moldova
21:45 (UTC+3)		Report (UEFA)	Tosun 37', 79'; Türüç 57'; Yazıcı 88'	Stadium: Stadionul Zimbru; Attendance: 8,281; Referee: Davide Massa (Italy)

11 October UEFA Euro 2020 qualifying	Andorra	1–0	Moldova	Andorra la Vella, Andorra
20:45 (UTC+2)	Vales 63'	Report (UEFA)		Stadium: Estadi Nacional; Attendance: 947; Referee: Jonathan Lardot (Belgium)

14 October UEFA Euro 2020 qualifying	Moldova	0–4	Albania	Chișinău, Moldova
21:45 (UTC+3)		Report (UEFA)	Cikalleshi 22'; Bare 34'; Trashi 40'; Manaj 90'	Stadium: Stadionul Zimbru; Attendance: 4,367; Referee: Chris Kavanagh (England)

14 November UEFA Euro 2020 qualifying	France	2–1	Moldova	Saint-Denis, France
20:45 (UTC+1)	Varane 35'; Giroud 79' (pen.)	Report (UEFA)	Rață 9'	Stadium: Stade de France; Attendance: 70,000; Referee: Gediminas Mažeika (Lithuania)

17 November UEFA Euro 2020 qualifying	Moldova	1–2	Iceland	Chișinău, Moldova
21:45 (UTC+2)	Milinceanu 56'	Report (UEFA)	Bjarnason 17'; G. Sigurðsson 65'	Stadium: Stadionul Zimbru; Attendance: 6,742; Referee: Pavel Královec (Czech Republic)
