= Tony Alexander =

Tony Alexander may refer to:

- Tony Alexander (footballer)
- Tony Alexander (swimmer)

== See also ==
- Anthony J. Alexander, American business executive in the energy industry
