= 2014 FIFA World Cup qualification – UEFA Group H =

The 2014 FIFA World Cup qualification UEFA Group H was a UEFA qualifying group for the 2014 FIFA World Cup. The group comprised England, Montenegro, Ukraine, Poland, Moldova and San Marino.

The group winners, England, qualified directly for the 2014 FIFA World Cup. Ukraine placed among the eight best runners-up and advanced to the play-offs, where they were drawn to play home-and-away matches against France. After winning the first match by two goals, they lost the second by three and thus failed to qualify for the World Cup.

== Standings ==
Pos	Team	Pld	W	D	L	GF	GA	GD	Pts	Qualification	England national football team	Ukraine national football team	Montenegro national football team	Poland national football team	Moldova national football team	San Marino national football team
1	England	10	6	4	0	31	4	+27	22	Qualification to 2014 FIFA World Cup	—	1–1	4–1	2–0	4–0	5–0
2	Ukraine	10	6	3	1	28	4	+24	21	Advance to second round	0–0	—	0–1	1–0	2–1	9–0
3	Montenegro	10	4	3	3	18	17	+1	15		1–1	0–4	—	2–2	2–5	3–0
4	Poland	10	3	4	3	18	12	+6	13		1–1	1–3	1–1	—	2–0	5–0
5	Moldova	10	3	2	5	12	17	−5	11		0–5	0–0	0–1	1–1	—	3–0
6	San Marino	10	0	0	10	1	54	−53	0		0–8	0–8	0–6	1–5	0–2	—

== Matches ==
The match schedule was determined at a meeting in Warsaw, Poland, on 23 November 2011.

7 September 2012
20:30 UTC+2

Montenegro	2–2	Poland
Drinčić 27'; Vučinić 45+2'	Report	Błaszczykowski 6' (pen.); Mierzejewski 55'

Stadion pod Goricom, Podgorica
Attendance: 11,420
Referee: Kristinn Jakobsson (Iceland)
7 September 2012
21:45 UTC+3

Moldova	0–5	England
	Report	Lampard 4' (pen.), 29'; Defoe 32'; Milner 74'; Baines 83'

Arena Zimbru, Chișinău
Attendance: 10,500
Referee: Pol van Boekel (Netherlands)

11 September 2012
20:30 UTC+2

San Marino	0–6	Montenegro
	Report	Đorđević 24'; Bećiraj 26', 51'; Zverotić 69'; Delibašić 78', 82'

Stadio Olimpico, Serravalle
Attendance: 1,947
Referee: Neil Doyle (Ireland)
11 September 2012
20:45 UTC+2

Poland	2–0	Moldova
Błaszczykowski 33' (pen.); Wawrzyniak 81'	Report

Stadion Miejski, Wrocław
Attendance: 26,145
Referee: Ilias Spathas (Greece)
11 September 2012
20:00 UTC+1

England	1–1	Ukraine
Lampard 87' (pen.)	Report	Konoplyanka 39'

Wembley Stadium, London
Attendance: 68,102
Referee: Cüneyt Çakır (Turkey)

12 October 2012
21:00 UTC+3

Moldova	0–0	Ukraine
	Report

Arena Zimbru, Chișinău
Attendance: 12,500
Referee: Clément Turpin (France)
12 October 2012
20:00 UTC+1

England	5–0	San Marino
Rooney 35' (pen.), 70'; Welbeck 37', 72'; Oxlade-Chamberlain 77'	Report

Wembley Stadium, London
Attendance: 86,645
Referee: Gediminas Mažeika (Lithuania)

16 October 2012
21:00 UTC+3

Ukraine	0–1	Montenegro
	Report	Damjanović 45'

Olympic Stadium, Kyiv
Attendance: 50,597
Referee: Michael Koukoulakis (Greece)
16 October 2012
20:30 UTC+2

San Marino	0–2	Moldova
	Report	Dadu 72' (pen.); Epureanu 78'

Stadio Olimpico, Serravalle
Attendance: 736
Referee: Marios Panayi (Cyprus)
17 October 2012 (Note: Poland v England was originally to be played on 16 October 2012, 21:00 local time, but was postponed to the next day due to torrential rain rendering the pitch unplayable.)
17:00 UTC+2

Poland	1–1	England
Glik 70'	Report	Rooney 31'

Stadion Narodowy, Warsaw
Attendance: 47,000
Referee: Gianluca Rocchi (Italy)

14 November 2012
18:00 UTC+1

Montenegro	3–0	San Marino
Delibašić 14', 31'; Zverotić 68'	Report

Stadion pod Goricom, Podgorica
Attendance: 7,158
Referee: Sandor Szabo (Hungary)

22 March 2013
21:30 UTC+2

Moldova	0–1	Montenegro
	Report	Vučinić 78'

Arena Zimbru, Chișinău
Attendance: 5,400
Referee: Daniele Orsato (Italy)
22 March 2013
20:45 UTC+1

Poland	1–3	Ukraine
Piszczek 18'	Report	Yarmolenko 2'; Husyev 7'; Zozulya 45'

Stadion Narodowy, Warsaw
Attendance: 55,565
Referee: Pavel Královec (Czech Republic)
22 March 2013
21:00 UTC+1

San Marino	0–8	England
	Report	Della Valle 12' (o.g.); Oxlade-Chamberlain 29'; Defoe 34', 77'; Young 39'; Lampard 42'; Rooney 54'; Sturridge 70'

Stadio Olimpico, Serravalle
Attendance: 4,952
Referee: Alain Bieri (Switzerland)

26 March 2013
21:00 UTC+2

Ukraine	2–1	Moldova
Yarmolenko 61'; Khacheridi 70'	Report	Suvorov 80'

Chornomorets Stadium, Odesa
Attendance: 31,948
Referee: Kenn Hansen (Denmark)
26 March 2013
20:45 UTC+1

Poland	5–0	San Marino
Lewandowski 21' (pen.), 50' (pen.); Piszczek 28'; Teodorczyk 60'; Kosecki 90+2'	Report

Stadion Narodowy, Warsaw
Attendance: 43,008
Referee: Ken Henry Johnsen (Norway)
26 March 2013
21:00 UTC+1

Montenegro	1–1	England
Kaluđerović 76'	Report	Rooney 6'

Stadion pod Goricom, Podgorica
Attendance: 13,000
Referee: Jonas Eriksson (Sweden)

7 June 2013
21:15 UTC+3

Moldova	1–1	Poland
Sidorenco 36'	Report	Błaszczykowski 6'

Arena Zimbru, Chișinău
Attendance: 8,726
Referee: Fernando Teixeira Vitienes (Spain)
7 June 2013
20:30 UTC+2

Montenegro	0–4	Ukraine
	Report	Harmash 51'; Konoplyanka 77'; Fedetskiy 84'; Bezus 90+3'

Stadion pod Goricom, Podgorica
Attendance: 11,996
Referee: Manuel Gräfe (Germany)

6 September 2013
21:00 UTC+3

Ukraine	9–0	San Marino
Dević 11'; Seleznyov 26'; Edmar 32'; Khacheridi 45', 54'; Konoplyanka 50'; Bezus 63'; Fedetskiy 74'; Rakytskiy 90+3'	Report

Arena Lviv, Lviv
Attendance: 34,190
Referee: Neil Doyle (Republic of Ireland)
6 September 2013
20:45 UTC+2

Poland	1–1	Montenegro
Lewandowski 16'	Report	Damjanović 11'

Stadion Narodowy, Warsaw
Attendance: 45,652
Referee: Björn Kuipers (Netherlands)
6 September 2013
20:00 UTC+1

England	4–0	Moldova
Gerrard 12'; Lambert 26'; Welbeck 45+1', 50'	Report

Wembley Stadium, London
Attendance: 61,607
Referee: Ivan Kružliak (Slovakia)

10 September 2013
20:45 UTC+2

San Marino	1–5	Poland
Della Valle 22'	Report	Zieliński 10', 66'; Błaszczykowski 23'; Sobota 34'; Mierzejewski 75'

Stadio Olimpico, Serravalle
Attendance: 1,597
Referee: Marco Borg (Malta)
10 September 2013
21:45 UTC+3

Ukraine	0–0	England
	Report

Olympic Stadium, Kyiv
Attendance: 69,890
Referee: Pedro Proença (Portugal)

11 October 2013
19:00 UTC+3

Moldova	3–0	San Marino
Frunză 55'; Sidorenco 59', 89'	Report

Arena Zimbru, Chișinău
Attendance: 7,348
Referee: Ignasi Villamayor Rozados (Andorra)
11 October 2013
21:00 UTC+3

Ukraine	1–0	Poland
Yarmolenko 64'	Report

Metalist Stadium, Kharkiv
Attendance: 39,136
Referee: Jonas Eriksson (Sweden)
11 October 2013
20:00 UTC+1

England	4–1	Montenegro
Rooney 48'; Bošković 62' (o.g.); Townsend 78'; Sturridge 90+3' (pen.)	Report	Damjanović 71'

Wembley Stadium, London
Attendance: 83,807
Referee: Alberto Undiano Mallenco (Spain)

15 October 2013
20:00 UTC+1

England	2–0	Poland
Rooney 41'; Gerrard 88'	Report

Wembley Stadium, London
Attendance: 85,186
Referee: Damir Skomina (Slovenia)
15 October 2013
21:00 UTC+2

Montenegro	2–5	Moldova
Jovetić 55' (pen.), 90+1'	Report	Antoniuc 28', 89'; Armaș 62'; Sidorenco 64'; Ioniță 73'

Stadion pod Goricom, Podgorica
Attendance: 5,770
Referee: Robert Schörgenhofer (Austria)
15 October 2013
21:00 UTC+2

San Marino	0–8	Ukraine
	Report	Seleznyov 13' (pen.), 18'; Dević 15', 51', 57' (pen.); Yarmolenko 55'; Bezus 65'; Mandzyuk 80'

Stadio Olimpico, Serravalle
Attendance: 1,268
Referee: Harald Lechner (Austria)

== Goalscorers ==
There were 108 goals scored in 30 matches, for an average of 3.6 goals per match.

7 goals

- (England) Wayne Rooney

4 goals

- (England) Frank Lampard
- (England) Danny Welbeck
- (Moldova) Eugen Sidorenco
- (Montenegro) Andrija Delibašić
- (Montenegro) Dejan Damjanović
- (Poland) Jakub Błaszczykowski
- (Ukraine) Andriy Yarmolenko
- (Ukraine) Marko Dević

3 goals

- (England) Jermain Defoe
- (Poland) Robert Lewandowski
- (Ukraine) Yevhen Khacheridi
- (Ukraine) Yevhen Konoplyanka
- (Ukraine) Yevhen Seleznyov
- (Ukraine) Roman Bezus

2 goals

- (England) Steven Gerrard
- (England) Daniel Sturridge
- (England) Alex Oxlade-Chamberlain
- (Moldova) Alexandru Antoniuc
- (Montenegro) Fatos Bećiraj
- (Montenegro) Stevan Jovetić
- (Montenegro) Mirko Vučinić
- (Montenegro) Elsad Zverotić
- (Poland) Adrian Mierzejewski
- (Poland) Łukasz Piszczek
- (Poland) Piotr Zieliński
- (Ukraine) Artem Fedetskiy

1 goal

- (England) Leighton Baines
- (England) Rickie Lambert
- (England) James Milner
- (England) Andros Townsend
- (England) Ashley Young
- (Moldova) Igor Armaș
- (Moldova) Serghei Dadu
- (Moldova) Alexandru Epureanu
- (Moldova) Viorel Frunză
- (Moldova) Artur Ioniță
- (Moldova) Alexandru Suvorov
- (Montenegro) Luka Đorđević
- (Montenegro) Nikola Drinčić
- (Poland) Kamil Glik
- (Poland) Jakub Kosecki
- (Poland) Waldemar Sobota
- (Poland) Łukasz Teodorczyk
- (Poland) Jakub Wawrzyniak
- (San Marino) Alessandro Della Valle
- (Ukraine) Edmar
- (Ukraine) Denys Harmash
- (Ukraine) Oleh Husyev
- (Ukraine) Vitaliy Mandzyuk
- (Ukraine) Yaroslav Rakytskiy
- (Ukraine) Roman Zozulya

1 own goal

- (Montenegro) Branko Bošković (against England)
- (San Marino) Alessandro Della Valle (against England)

== Discipline ==
Pos	Player	Country	Booked	Sent off (straight red)	Suspended for match(es)	Reason
DF	Savo Pavićević	Montenegro	4	2	vs San Marino (11 September 2012) vs Poland (6 September 2013)	Sent off in a 2014 World Cup qualifying match Sent off in a 2014 World Cup qualifying match
MF	Alexandru Gațcan	Moldova	5	1	vs Ukraine (26 March 2013) vs Montenegro (15 October 2013)	Sent off in a 2014 World Cup qualifying match Booked in two 2014 World Cup qualifying matches
MF	Steven Gerrard	England	2	1	vs San Marino (12 October 2012)	Sent off in a 2014 World Cup qualifying match
MF	Milorad Pekovic	Montenegro	2	1	vs England (26 March 2013)	Sent off in a 2014 World Cup qualifying match
MF	Vladimir Volkov	Montenegro	3	1	vs Poland (6 September 2013)	Sent off in a 2014 World Cup qualifying match
ST	Roman Zozulya	Ukraine	0	1	vs San Marino (6 September 2013)	Sent off in a 2014 World Cup qualifying match
MF	Ludovic Obraniak	Poland	0	1	vs Moldova (11 September 2012)	Sent off in a 2014 World Cup qualifying match
MF	Taras Stepanenko	Ukraine	2	1	vs Montenegro (7 June 2013)	Sent off in a 2014 World Cup qualifying match
FW	Mirko Vučinić	Montenegro	4	0	vs San Marino (14 November 2012) vs England (11 October 2013)	Booked in two 2014 World Cup qualifying matches Booked in two 2014 World Cup qualifying matches
DF	Glen Johnson	England	3	0	vs San Marino (12 October 2012)	Booked in two 2014 World Cup qualifying matches
DF	Davide Simoncini	San Marino	5	0	vs Montenegro (14 November 2012) vs Poland (10 September 2013)	Booked in two 2014 World Cup qualifying matches Booked in two 2014 World Cup qualifying matches
MF	Eugen Polanski	Poland	3	0	vs Ukraine (22 March 2013)	Booked in two 2014 World Cup qualifying matches
MF	Ruslan Rotan	Ukraine	3	0	vs Moldova (26 March 2013)	Booked in two 2014 World Cup qualifying matches
DF	Yevhen Khacheridi	Ukraine	4	0	vs Montenegro (16 October 2012) vs San Marino (15 October 2013)	Booked in two 2014 World Cup qualifying matches Booked in two 2014 World Cup qualifying matches
DF	Fabio Vitaioli	San Marino	3	0	vs Montenegro (14 November 2012)	Booked in two 2014 World Cup qualifying matches
DF	Yevhen Selin	Ukraine	2	0	vs Poland (22 March 2013)	Booked in two 2014 World Cup qualifying matches
DF	Savo Pavićević	Montenegro	2	0	vs England (26 March 2013)	Booked in two 2014 World Cup qualifying matches
MF	Denys Garmash	Ukraine	2	0	vs Moldova (26 March 2013)	Booked in two 2014 World Cup qualifying matches
MF	Michele Cervellini	San Marino	4	0	vs Poland (26 March 2013)	Booked in two 2014 World Cup qualifying matches
MF	Serghei Gheorghiev	Moldova	3	0	vs Poland (7 June 2013)	Booked in two 2014 World Cup qualifying matches
MF	Mitar Novaković	Montenegro	2	0	vs Ukraine (7 June 2013)	Booked in two 2014 World Cup qualifying matches
DF	Alessandro Della Valle	San Marino	4	1	vs Ukraine (6 September 2013)	Booked in two 2014 World Cup qualifying matches
DF	Kamil Glik	Poland	2	0	vs San Marino (10 September 2013)	Booked in two 2014 World Cup qualifying matches
FW	Danny Welbeck	England	2	0	vs Ukraine (10 September 2013)	Booked in two 2014 World Cup qualifying matches
DF	Gianluca Bollini	San Marino	2	0	vs Moldova (11 October 2013)	Booked in two 2014 World Cup qualifying matches
ST	Matteo Vitaioli	San Marino	3	0	vs Moldova (11 October 2013)	Booked in two 2014 World Cup qualifying matches
MF	Lorenzo Buscarini	San Marino	2	0	vs Moldova (11 October 2013)	Booked in two 2014 World Cup qualifying matches
DF	Oleksandr Kucher	Ukraine	2	0	vs Poland (11 October 2013)	Booked in two 2014 World Cup qualifying matches
MF	Enrico Cibelli	San Marino	2	0	vs Ukraine (15 October 2013)	Booked in two 2014 World Cup qualifying matches
MF	Alex Gasperoni	San Marino	2	0	vs Ukraine (15 October 2013)	Booked in two 2014 World Cup qualifying matches
DF	Kyle Walker	England	2	0	vs Poland (15 October 2013)	Booked in two 2014 World Cup qualifying matches
DF	Łukasz Szukała	Poland	2	0	vs England (15 October 2013)	Booked in two 2014 World Cup qualifying matches

== Attendances ==
Team	Highest	Lowest	Average
England	86,645	61,607	72,118
Moldova	12,500	9,000	10,667
Montenegro	13,000	7,158	10,079
Poland	55,565	26,145	42,930
San Marino	4,980	736	2,554
Ukraine	69,890	31,000	45,150
