= Alexandru Antoniuc =

Moldovan footballer

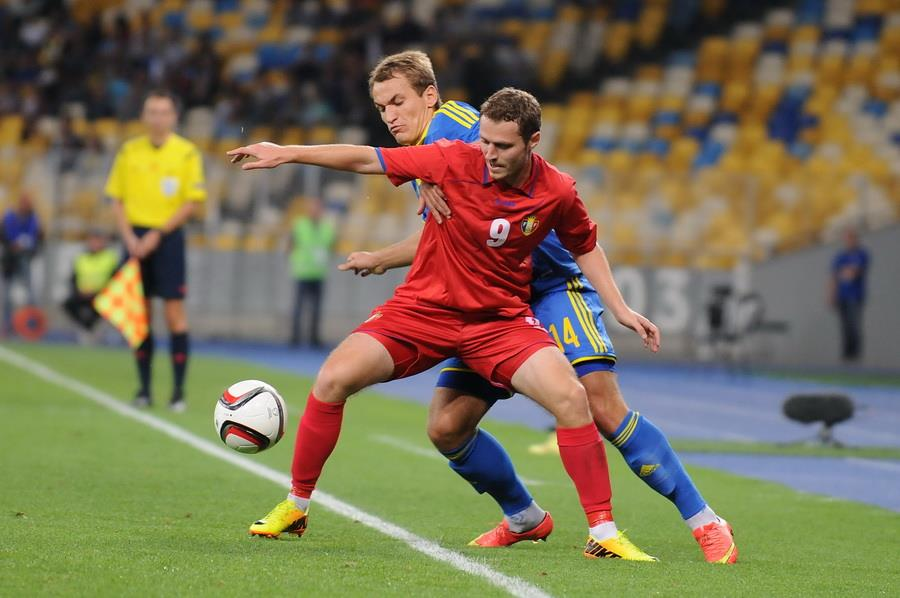
- Antoniuc with Moldova in 2014

Personal information
- Date of birth: 23 May 1989 (age 37)
- Place of birth: Chișinău, Moldavian SSR, Soviet Union
- Height: 1.78 m (5 ft 10 in)
- Position: Midfielder

Youth career
- Zimbru-2 Chișinău

Senior career*
Years	Team	Apps	(Gls)
2007–2010	Zimbru Chișinău	78	(11)
2010–2013	Rubin Kazan	3	(0)
2012	→ KAMAZ (loan)	10	(0)
2012–2013	→ Zimbru Chișinău (loan)	21	(6)
2013–2014	Veris Chișinău	29	(4)
2014–2025	Milsami Orhei	234	(41)

International career^{‡}
2007	Moldova U17	4	(0)
2008	Moldova U19	6	(0)
2009	Moldova U21	7	(0)
2010–2022	Moldova	48	(3)
- * Club domestic league appearances and goals as of 15 August 2026 ‡ National team caps and goals as of 17 April 2023

Alexandru Antoniuc (born 23 May 1989) is a Moldovan former footballer who played as a midfielder.

== Club career ==
He made his professional debut on 13 July 2007 against Politehnica Chișinău and scored his first goal against Olimpia Bălţi on 16 March 2008 to finish a 7–0 rout.

He signed a four-year contract with reigning Russian Premier League champions Rubin Kazan on 23 June 2010.

== International career ==
In the final match of 2014 FIFA World Cup qualifying, Moldova took on Montenegro in Podgorica. Both teams had nothing to play for as England and Ukraine had already taken first and second place. Antoniuc scored twice in a 5–2 away win, Moldova's joint biggest competitive away win.

== Career statistics ==
=== Club ===
As of match played 26 May 2021

Club	Season	League			Cup		Europe		Total	
Club	Season	Division	Apps	Goals	Apps	Goals	Apps	Goals	Apps	Goals
Zimbru Chișinău	2007–08	Moldovan National Division	26	2	0	0	–		26	2
Zimbru Chișinău	2008–09	Moldovan National Division	23	4	2	0	–		25	4
Zimbru Chișinău	2009–10	Moldovan National Division	29	5	2	0	4	0	35	5
Zimbru Chișinău	Total		78	11	4	0	4	0	86	11
Rubin Kazan	2010	Russian Premier League	1	0	0	0	0	0	1	0
Rubin Kazan	2011–12	Russian Premier League	2	0	1	0	0	0	3	0
Rubin Kazan	Total		3	0	1	0	0	0	4	0
KAMAZ (loan)	2011–12	Russian Football National League	10	0	0	0	–		10	0
Zimbru Chișinău (loan)	2012–13	Moldovan National Division	21	6	1	0	0	0	22	6
Veris Chișinău	2013–14	Moldovan National Division	29	4	1	0	–		30	4
Milsami Orhei	2014–15	Moldovan National Division	24	2	0	0	–		24	2
Milsami Orhei	2015–16	Moldovan National Division	23	3	3	1	5	1	31	5
Milsami Orhei	2016–17	Moldovan National Division	16	1	1	0	–		17	1
Milsami Orhei	2017	Moldovan National Division	18	3	0	0	2	1	20	4
Milsami Orhei	2018	Moldovan National Division	27	7	5	0	2	0	34	7
Milsami Orhei	2019	Moldovan National Division	21	5	3	0	2	0	26	5
Milsami Orhei	2020–21	Moldovan National Division	36	15	1	0	–		37	15
Milsami Orhei	Total		165	36	13	1	11	2	189	39
Career total			306	57	20	1	15	2	341	60

=== International ===
Scores and results list Moldova's goal tally first.

List of international goals scored by Alexandru Antoniuc
No.	Date	Venue	Opponent	Score	Result	Competition
1	15 October 2013	Podgorica City Stadium, Montenegro	Montenegro	1–0	5–2	2014 World Cup qualifier
2	15 October 2013	Podgorica City Stadium, Montenegro	Montenegro	5–2	5–2	2014 World Cup qualifier
3	17 November 2015	Baku Olympic Stadium, Baku, Azerbaijan	Azerbaijan	1–1	1–2	Friendly

== Honours ==
Milsami Orhei

- Moldovan National Division: 2014–15
- Moldovan Cup: 2017–18
- Moldovan Super Cup: 2019
