= Jakub Wawrzyniak =

Polish footballer

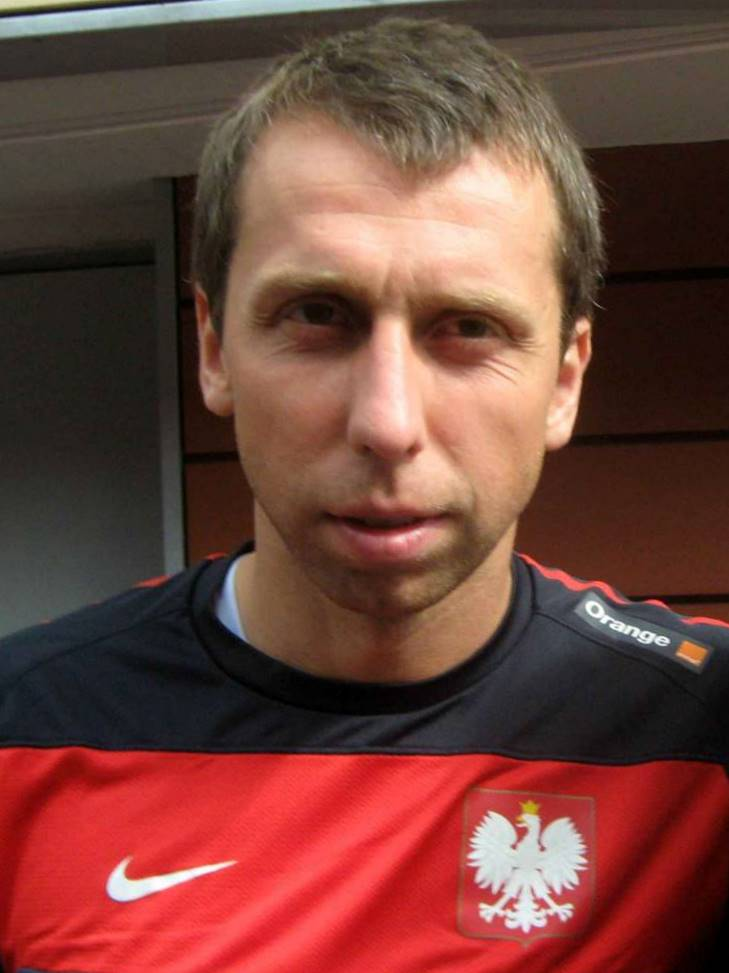

Personal information
- Date of birth: 7 July 1983 (age 43)
- Place of birth: Kutno, Poland
- Height: 1.88 m (6 ft 2 in)
- Position: Left-back

Senior career*
Years	Team	Apps	(Gls)
- Sparta Złotów
2001	MSP Szamotuły		
2002	Sparta Oborniki		
2002–2003	Sparta Brodnica	28	(1)
2003	Błękitni Stargard Szczeciński	13	(1)
2003–2005	Świt Nowy Dwór Mazowiecki	19	(0)
2005–2007	Widzew Łódź	70	(5)
2007–2013	Legia Warsaw	127	(7)
2009	→ Panathinaikos (loan)	9	(0)
2014	Amkar Perm	15	(1)
2015–2018	Lechia Gdańsk	98	(0)
2018–2019	GKS Katowice	20	(1)

International career
2006–2016	Poland	49	(1)
- * Club domestic league appearances and goals

Jakub Wawrzyniak (Polish pronunciation: [ˈjakub vavˈʐɨɲak]; born 7 July 1983) is a Polish football pundit and former professional player. He usually played as a left–back or centre–back. Earlier in his career, he also appeared a few times as a striker and as a midfielder.

== Club career ==
Wawrzyniak played for Legia Warsaw from fall 2007 to the end of 2008.

On 4 June 2009 the Disciplinary Committee of the Greek Superliga suspended him for three months on doping charges. His suspension was later extended to one year. Panathinaikos announced they would not take up their buy option on the player, thus leaving Wawrzyniak to return to Legia Warsaw. The substance in question is not prohibited by the World Anti-Doping Agency. Wawrzyniak appealed to the Court of Arbitration for Sport in Lausanne. In December 2009 the court shortened his suspension to the original three months. The player intends to pursue compensation from the Greek association.

On 26 February 2014, he joined Russian Premier League club Amkar Perm.

On 5 January 2015, he joined Lechia Gdańsk.

== International career ==
Wawrzyniak made his debut for the Poland national team in a friendly game against UAE on 6 December 2006 in Abu Zabi. In total, he earned 49 caps throughout his international career.

== Career statistics ==
=== Club ===
Appearances and goals by club, season and competition
Club	Season	League			National cup (Note: Includes Polish Cup, Greek Cup)		Europe		Other		Total	
Club	Season	Division	Apps	Goals	Apps	Goals	Apps	Goals	Apps	Goals	Apps	Goals
Sparta Brodnica	2002–03	III liga	28	1	—		—		—		28	1
Błękitni Stargard	2003–04	II liga	13	1	—		—		—		13	1
Świt Nowy Dwór Mazowiecki	2003–04	Ekstraklasa	3	0	0	0	—		—		3	0
Świt Nowy Dwór Mazowiecki	2004–05	II liga	16	0	7	0	—		—		23	0
Świt Nowy Dwór Mazowiecki	Total		19	0	7	0	—		—		26	0
Widzew Łódź	2004–05	II liga	15	1	0	0	—		2 (Note: Appearances in Ekstraklasa promotion/relegation play-offs)	0	17	1
Widzew Łódź	2005–06	II liga	32	4	1	0	—		—		33	4
Widzew Łódź	2006–07	Ekstraklasa	21	0	1	0	—		3 (Note: Appearances in Ekstraklasa Cup)	0	25	0
Widzew Łódź	Total		68	5	2	0	—		5	0	75	5
Legia Warsaw	2007–08	Ekstraklasa	17	0	6	2	1 (Note: Appearance in UEFA Intertoto Cup)	0	6	0	30	2
Legia Warsaw	2008–09	Ekstraklasa	16	1	0	0	1 (Note: Appearance(s) in UEFA Cup/Europa League)	0	2 (Note: One appearance in Ekstraklasa Cup, one appearance in Polish Super Cup)	1	19	2
Legia Warsaw	2009–10	Ekstraklasa	8	1	1	0	—		—		9	1
Legia Warsaw	2010–11	Ekstraklasa	20	2	5	0	—		—		25	2
Legia Warsaw	2011–12	Ekstraklasa	29	1	5	1	11	1	—		45	3
Legia Warsaw	2012–13	Ekstraklasa	25	2	3	0	5	0	1 (Note: Appearance in Polish Super Cup)	0	34	2
Legia Warsaw	2013–14	Ekstraklasa	12	0	1	0	8 (Note: Three appearances in UEFA Champions League, five appearances in UEFA Europa League)	0	—		21	0
Legia Warsaw	Total		127	7	21	3	26	1	9	1	183	12
Panathinaikos (loan)	2008–09	Super League Greece	9	0	2	0	2 (Note: Appearances in UEFA Champions League)	0	—		13	0
Amkar Perm	2013–14	Russian Premier League	9	1	0	0	—		—		9	1
Amkar Perm	2014–15	Russian Premier League	6	0	0	0	—		—		6	0
Amkar Perm	Total		15	1	0	0	—		—		15	1
Lechia Gdańsk	2014–15	Ekstraklasa	11	0	0	0	—		—		11	0
Lechia Gdańsk	2015–16	Ekstraklasa	32	0	1	0	—		—		33	0
Lechia Gdańsk	2016–17	Ekstraklasa	35	0	2	0	—		—		37	0
Lechia Gdańsk	2017–18	Ekstraklasa	20	0	1	0	—		—		21	0
Lechia Gdańsk	Total		98	0	4	0	—		—		102	0
GKS Katowice	2018–19	I liga	20	1	1	0	—		—		21	1
Career total			397	16	36	3	28	1	14	1	475	21

=== International ===
Appearances and goals by national team and year
National team	Year	Apps	Goals
Poland
Poland	2006	1	0
Poland	2007	4	0
Poland	2008	9	0
Poland	2009	2	0
Poland	2011	8	0
Poland	2012	7	1
Poland	2013	7	0
Poland	2014	5	0
Poland	2015	4	0
Poland	2016	2	0
Total		49	1

Scores and results list Poland's goal tally first, score column indicates score after each Wawrzyniak goal.

List of international goals scored by Jakub Wawrzyniak
No.	Date	Venue	Opponent	Score	Result	Competition
1	11 September 2012	Stadion Miejski, Wrocław, Poland	Moldova	2–0	2–0	2014 FIFA World Cup qualification

== Kickboxing record ==
Professional kickboxing record
1 Wins (1 (T)KOs), 0 Loss, 0 Draw
Date	Result	Opponent	Event	Location	Method	Round	Time
2023-12-29	Win	(Poland) Tomasz Hajto	Clout MMA 3	Warsaw, Poland	TKO (Punches)	2	1:06

== Honours ==
Widzew Łódź

- II liga: 2005–06

Legia Warsaw

- Ekstraklasa: 2012–13, 2013–14
- Polish Cup: 2007–08, 2010–11, 2011–12, 2012–13
- Polish Super Cup: 2008
