= Jack Casley =

English footballer

Personal information
- Date of birth: 27 April 1926
- Place of birth: Torquay, England
- Date of death: 31 May 2014 (aged 88)
- Position: Midfielder

Senior career*
Years	Team	Apps	(Gls)
1947–1949	Torquay United	1	(0)
1949–1951	Headington United	18	(3)
- * Club domestic league appearances and goals

John Casley (27 April 1926 – 31 May 2014) was an English professional footballer, born in Torquay, who played in the Football League for Torquay United.

Casley joined Torquay United in June 1947. An injury crisis, including the loss of regular keeper Phil Joslin, left Torquay without a goalkeeper for the match at Plainmoor against Walsall in April 1948 and, although a midfielder, Casley played in goal and helped Torquay to a 3–2 victory, which in turn meant that they would not finish at the foot of the league. Casley never played for Torquay's league team again, in any position, joining Headington United (later to become Oxford United) in 1949 as their first professional player. Casley played his first game for Headington in goal, but reverted to the outfield thereafter, and scored the club's first hat-trick in the Southern League in his third game. He retired as a first-team player in 1951, but remained with the club, stepping down as chief scout only in 2002, aged 75, after 53 years' association with the club. He died on 31 May 2014 from natural causes at the age of 88.
