= Michele Cervellini =

Sammarinese footballer

Personal information
- Full name: Michele Cervellini
- Date of birth: 14 April 1988 (age 38)
- Place of birth: San Marino
- Height: 1.80 m (5 ft 11 in)
- Position: Midfielder

Team information
- Current team: Domagnano
- Number: 14

Senior career*
Years	Team	Apps	(Gls)
2006–2007	A.C. Rimini		
2007–2008	Saint Ermete Calcio		
2007–2012	A.C. Juvenes/Dogana	68	(5)
2012–2016	S.S. Pennarossa	62	(2)
2016–2018	A.C. Libertas	32	(0)
2018–2022	S.S. Cosmos	49	(1)
2022–2023	SP Cailungo	19	(0)
2023–2025	Domagnano	21	(0)

International career^{‡}
2009–2017	San Marino	35	(0)
- * Club domestic league appearances and goals as of 5 June 2026 ‡ National team caps and goals as of 13 April 2023

Michele Cervellini (born 14 April 1988) is a retired Sammarinese footballer who last played for Domagnano in San Marino.

He made 35 appearances for the San Marino national football team between 2009 and 2017.
