= Geoff Richards (footballer) =

English footballer and manager

Personal information
- Full name: Geoffrey Mottram Richards
- Date of birth: 24 April 1929
- Place of birth: Bilston, England
- Date of death: 8 May 2014 (aged 85)
- Place of death: Wolverhampton, England
- Position: Winger

Youth career
- 1943–1946: West Bromwich Albion

Senior career*
Years	Team	Apps	(Gls)
1946–1952	West Bromwich Albion	3	(1)
- Stafford Rangers
- Atherstone Town
- Bilston Town
- Hednesford Town

Managerial career
- Hednesford Town
- * Club domestic league appearances and goals

Geoffrey Mottram Richards (24 April 1929 – 8 May 2014) was an English professional footballer who played as a winger.

== Career ==
Born in Bilston, Richards played for West Bromwich Albion between 1943 and 1952, making three appearances for them in the Football League. He later played non-league football for Stafford Rangers, Atherstone Town, Bilston Town and Hednesford Town, where he was player-manager.

== Later life and death ==
Richards died on 8 May 2014, at the age of 85.
