= Lorenzo Buscarini =

Sammarinese footballer

Personal information
- Date of birth: 27 May 1991 (age 35)
- Position: Midfielder

Senior career*
Years	Team	Apps	(Gls)
2010–2012	Cailungo	42	(2)
2012–2017	Murata	74	(3)
2017–2019	Domagnano	30	(2)

International career^{‡}
2012–2014	San Marino	5	(0)
- * Club domestic league appearances and goals as of 18 July 2020 ‡ National team caps and goals as of 18 July 2020

Lorenzo Buscarini (born 27 May 1991) is a Sammarinese former international footballer who played as a midfielder.

== International career ==
Buscarini made his senior international debut on 12 October 2012, coming on as a substitute in a 5–0 away defeat to England.
