= Eugen Sidorenco =

Moldovan footballer

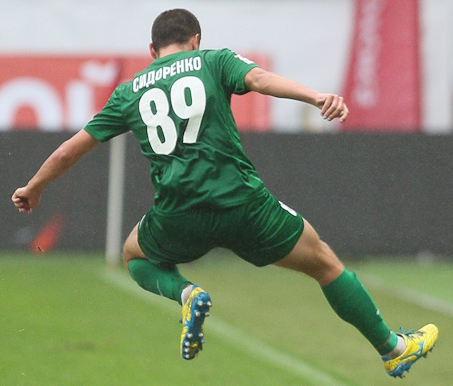
- Sidorenco with Tom Tomsk in 2013

Personal information
- Date of birth: 19 March 1989 (age 37)
- Place of birth: Chișinău, Moldavian SSR, Soviet Union
- Height: 1.78 m (5 ft 10 in)
- Position: Left winger

Team information
- Current team: Florești

Senior career*
Years	Team	Apps	(Gls)
2007	Zimbru-2 Chișinău	11	(1)
2007–2012	Zimbru Chișinău	90	(11)
2012–2013	Hapoel Nazareth Illit	33	(6)
2013–2015	Tom Tomsk	6	(0)
2014	→ Khimik Dzerzhinsk (loan)	9	(0)
2014–2015	→ Hapoel Nazareth Illit (loan)	30	(3)
2015–2016	Hapoel Nazareth Illit	4	(1)
2016–2018	Milsami Orhei	46	(5)
2018	Zimbru Chișinău	11	(1)
2019	Poli Timișoara	17	(0)
2019–2020	Zimbru Chișinău	7	(0)
2020	Vllaznia Shkodër	16	(3)
2021	Suwaiq Club	0	(0)
2021–2022	Zimbru Chișinău	18	(5)
2022	Asteras Vlachioti	17	(2)
2022–2023	Zimbru Chișinău	20	(4)
2023	Ungheni	15	(15)
2024	Castelfidardo		
2024–2025	Spartanii Sportul	10	(0)
2025	Olimp Comrat		
2025–	Florești		

International career^{‡}
2010–2019	Moldova	35	(7)
- * Club domestic league appearances and goals as of 26 May 2025 ‡ National team caps and goals as of 2 April 2022

Eugen Sidorenco (born 19 March 1989) is a Moldovan professional footballer who plays as a left winger for Florești.

== Club career ==
=== FC Zimbru ===
In 2007, Sidorenco signed for Moldovan club FC Zimbru Chişinău.

In the summer of 2013, Sidorenco signed for Russian Premier League side FC Tom Tomsk from Liga Leumit side Hapoel Nazareth Illit.

== International career ==
On 26 May 2010, he made his debut for the Moldova national football team in a friendly match against Azerbaijan.

=== International goals ===
On 14 June 2013, Sidorenco scored twice as Moldova beat Kyrgyzstan 2–1 in a home friendly. He scored the first and last goals of the game.

Scores and results list Moldova's goal tally first.

List of international goals scored by Eugen Sidorenco
No	Date	Venue	Opponent	Score	Result	Competition
1.	7 June 2013	Zimbru Stadium, Chișinău, Moldova	Poland	1–1	1–1	2014 FIFA World Cup qualification
2.	14 June 2013	Sheriff Stadium, Tiraspol, Moldova	Kyrgyzstan	1–0	2–1	Friendly
3.	14 June 2013	Sheriff Stadium, Tiraspol, Moldova	Kyrgyzstan	2–1	2–1	Friendly
4.	11 October 2013	Zimbru Stadium, Chișinău, Moldova	San Marino	2–0	3–0	2014 FIFA World Cup qualification
5.	11 October 2013	Zimbru Stadium, Chișinău, Moldova	San Marino	3–0	3–0	2014 FIFA World Cup qualification
6.	15 October 2013	Podgorica City Stadium, Podgorica, Montenegro	Montenegro	3–1	5–2	2014 FIFA World Cup qualification
7.	27 May 2014	Stadion SVU Mauer, Austria	Canada	1–0	1–1	Friendly

=== International ===
Appearances and goals by national team and year
National team	Year	Apps	Goals
Moldova	2010	1	0
Moldova	2011	1	0
Moldova	2012	4	0
Moldova	2013	9	6
Moldova	2014	9	1
Moldova	2015	1	0
Moldova	2016	7	0
Moldova	2017	2	0
Moldova	2019	1	0
Total		35	7
