= Tony Alexander (footballer) =

English footballer (1935–2013)

Personal information
- Full name: Anthony Alan Alexander
- Date of birth: 8 February 1935
- Place of birth: Reading, Berkshire, England
- Date of death: 9 October 2013 (aged 78)
- Position: Forward

Senior career*
Years	Team	Apps	(Gls)
1952–1956	Reading	11	(2)
1956–1957	Yeovil Town		
1957–1958	Crystal Palace	0	(0)
1957–1960	Bedford Town		
- * Club domestic league appearances and goals

Anthony Alan Alexander (8 February 1935 – 9 October 2013) was an English footballer who played in the Football League for Reading as an inside-forward.

Alexander also played for Yeovil Town, Crystal Palace and Bedford Town.
