= 2011–12 in Welsh football =

The 2011–12 season was the 137th season of competitive football in Wales.

== Men's national team ==
The home team is on the left column; the away team is on the right column.

Win Draw Loss

=== Friendly match ===
10 Aug 2011 Friendly	Wales	1–2	Australia	Cardiff City Stadium, Cardiff
19:45	Darcy Blake 38'		Tim Cahill 44'; Robbie Kruse 60'	Attendance: 6,378; Referee: Kristo Tohver (Estonia)

12 Nov 2011 Friendly	Wales	4–1	Norway	Cardiff City Stadium, Cardiff
15:00	Gareth Bale 11'; Craig Bellamy 16'; Sam Vokes 88', 89'		Erik Huseklepp 61'	Attendance: 12,637; Referee: Gerher Grobelnik (Austria)

=== Euro 2012 qualification ===
The Welsh men's national team were drawn into UEFA Euro 2012 qualifying Group G.

All fixtures for this group were negotiated between the participants at a meeting in Frankfurt, Germany on 21 and 22 February 2010.

Pos	Team	Pld	W	D	L	GF	GA	GD	Pts	Qualification
1	England	8	5	3	0	17	5	+12	18	Qualify for final tournament
2	Montenegro	8	3	3	2	7	7	0	12	Advance to play-offs
3	Switzerland	8	3	2	3	12	10	+2	11	
4	Wales	8	3	0	5	6	10	−4	9	
5	Bulgaria	8	1	2	5	3	13	−10	5	

Source: UEFA
Rules for classification: Qualification tiebreakers

2 Sep 2011 Euro 2012 qualif.	Wales	2–1	Montenegro	Cardiff
19:45	Steve Morison 29'; Aaron Ramsey 50'	report	Stevan Jovetić 71'	Stadium: Cardiff City Stadium; Attendance: 17,500; Referee: Luca Banti (Italy)

6 Sep 2011 Euro 2012 qualif.	England	1–0	Wales	London
19:45	Ashley Young 35'	Source^{[usurped]}		Stadium: Wembley Stadium; Referee: Robert Schörgenhofer (Austria)

7 Oct 2011 Euro 2012 qualif.	Wales	2–0	Switzerland	Swansea
19:45	Aaron Ramsey 60'; Gareth Bale 71'	Source^{[usurped]}		Stadium: Liberty Stadium; Referee: Björn Kuipers (Netherlands)

11 Oct 2011 Euro 2012 qualif.	Bulgaria	0–1	Wales	Sofia
20:05		Source^{[usurped]}	Gareth Bale 45'	Stadium: Vasil Levski National Stadium; Referee: Pawel Gil (Portugal)

== Welsh Cup ==
Latest Round
Round 4

Team 1	Score	Team 2
Rhyl	3-4	Llanelli
Afan Lido	2−3	Airbus UK Broughton
Buckley Town	2−4	Bala Town
Flint Town United	1−3	Neath
Aberystwyth Town	2−1	Llandudno Town
The New Saints	4−0	Newport County
Prestatyn Town	0−2	Cefn Druids
Carmarthen Town	3−1	AFC Porth

Quarter-finals

Team 1	Score	Team 2
The New Saints	1-0	Neath
Bala Town	2-1	Llanelli
Airbus UK Broughton	3−1	Carmarthen Town
Aberystwyth Town	0−1	Cefn Druids

Semi-finals

Team 1	Score	Team 2
Airbus UK Broughton	1−4	Cefn Druids
Bala Town	0-4	The New Saints

Final

Team 1	Score	Team 2
Cefn Druids	0−2	The New Saints

== Welsh League Cup ==
Final: Afan Lido 1-1 Newtown (Afan Lido won 3–2 on penalties)

== Welsh Premier League ==
Pos	Team	Pld	W	D	L	GF	GA	GD	Pts	Qualification or relegation
1	The New Saints (C)	32	23	5	4	75	31	+44	74	Qualification for Champions League second qualifying round
2	Bangor City	32	22	3	7	72	45	+27	69	Qualification for Europa League first qualifying round
3	Neath (R)	32	18	8	6	60	36	+24	62	Relegated (Note: Neath were relegated on 27 April 2012, after failing in their Domestic and UEFA Competitions Licensing appeal, meaning they were relegated from the Welsh Premier League. Newtown would have been relegated otherwise.)
4	Llanelli (O)	32	18	5	9	63	36	+27	59	Qualification for Europa League play-offs
5	Bala Town	32	14	7	11	48	41	+7	49	Qualification for Europa League play-offs
6	Prestatyn Town	32	8	4	20	41	63	−22	28	Qualification for Europa League play-offs
7	Airbus UK Broughton	32	10	9	13	48	50	−2	39	Qualification for Europa League play-offs
8	Aberystwyth Town (Note: Aberystwyth Town deducted 1 point for fielding ineligible player)	32	8	10	14	44	50	−6	33	Qualification for Europa League play-offs
9	Port Talbot Town	32	8	9	15	39	51	−12	33	
10	Afan Lido	32	7	11	14	40	55	−15	32	
11	Carmarthen Town	32	10	2	20	33	67	−34	32	
12	Newtown (Note: Newtown deducted 3 points for fielding ineligible players.)	32	7	5	20	44	82	−38	23	Spared from relegation (Note: Haverfordwest County would have replaced Newtown AFC should they have finished second in a feeder league, and thus gaining promotion. A win for Taffs Well in a game Vs Caerau Ely meant this could not happen, sparing Newtown's relegation.)

Source: Welsh Premier^{[usurped]}
Rules for classification: 1) points; 2) goal difference; 3) number of goals scored.
Cefn Druids, playing in the 2011–12 Cymru Alliance, will qualify for the first qualifying round of the 2012–13 UEFA Europa League, even though they lost to The New Saints (themselves qualifiers for the UEFA Champions League), in the final of the 2011–12 Welsh Cup.
(C) Champions; (O) Play-off winners; (R) Relegated

== Welsh Football League First Division ==
- Champions: Cambrian & Clydach Vale B. & G.C.

== Cymru Alliance League ==
Pos	Team	Pld	W	D	L	GF	GA	GD	Pts	Promotion or relegation
1	Connah's Quay Nomads (C)	30	21	5	4	89	23	+66	68	Promotion to Welsh Premier League (Note: Promotion to the Premier League is subject to a licence application and approval process. If the champions do not apply for a Premier League licence or are declined of the same, the runners-up may be promoted instead.)
2	Rhyl	30	19	5	6	80	22	+58	62	
3	Buckley Town	30	19	4	7	67	43	+24	61	
4	Porthmadog (Note: Caersws & Porthmadog deducted three points for fielding an ineligible player.)	30	19	5	6	68	41	+27	59	
5	Penrhyncoch	30	17	4	9	56	44	+12	55	
6	Cefn Druids	30	17	3	10	58	42	+16	54	Qualification for Europa League first qualifying round
7	Caersws	30	17	4	9	68	49	+19	52	
8	Llandudno	30	14	7	9	55	40	+15	49	
9	Flint Town United	30	13	7	10	59	47	+12	46	
10	Conwy United	30	10	7	13	59	65	−6	37	
11	Guilsfield	30	10	4	16	41	58	−17	34	
12	Ruthin Town	30	6	7	17	28	60	−32	25	
13	Penycae	30	7	4	19	30	76	−46	25	
14	Llanrhaeadr (R)	30	3	9	18	40	77	−37	18	Relegation to Welsh Level 3
15	Llangefni Town (R)	30	4	2	24	32	96	−64	14	Relegation to Welsh Level 3
16	Rhos Aelwyd (R)	30	2	7	21	29	76	−47	13	Relegation to Welsh Level 3

Source: Soccerway
Rules for classification: 1) points; 2) goal difference; 3) number of goals scored.
(C) Champions; (R) Relegated
