= UEFA Euro 2012 qualifying =

International football competition for Euros

Tournament details
- Dates: 11 August 2010 – 15 November 2011
- Teams: 51

Tournament statistics
- Matches played: 248
- Goals scored: 665 (2.68 per match) (Note: The goal tally takes into account the original result of fixtures that were subsequently forfeited, not the awarded scoreline.)
- Top scorer: (Netherlands) Klaas-Jan Huntelaar (12 goals)

The qualifying competition for UEFA Euro 2012 was a series of parallel association football competitions held across Europe between 2010 and 2011 to decide the qualifiers for UEFA Euro 2012. The draw for the qualifying rounds was held on 7 February 2010 in the Congress Hall of the Palace of Culture and Science, Warsaw, with matches set to take place between August 2010 and November 2011.

Two host countries qualified automatically. For the first qualifying round, there were nine groups. Six of these groups had six teams (one from pots 1 to 6 below); the remaining three groups consisted of five teams (one each from pots 1 to 5 below). The group competition was a double round robin: each team hosted a game with every other team in its group. Each group winner qualified, along with the second-place team with the most points against teams ranked in the top five in the group. The remaining eight second-place teams were paired for two-game play-offs, with the winner of each total goals tie (or away goals rule, or penalty shootout) qualifying for the finals to complete the field of sixteen teams.

== Qualified teams ==
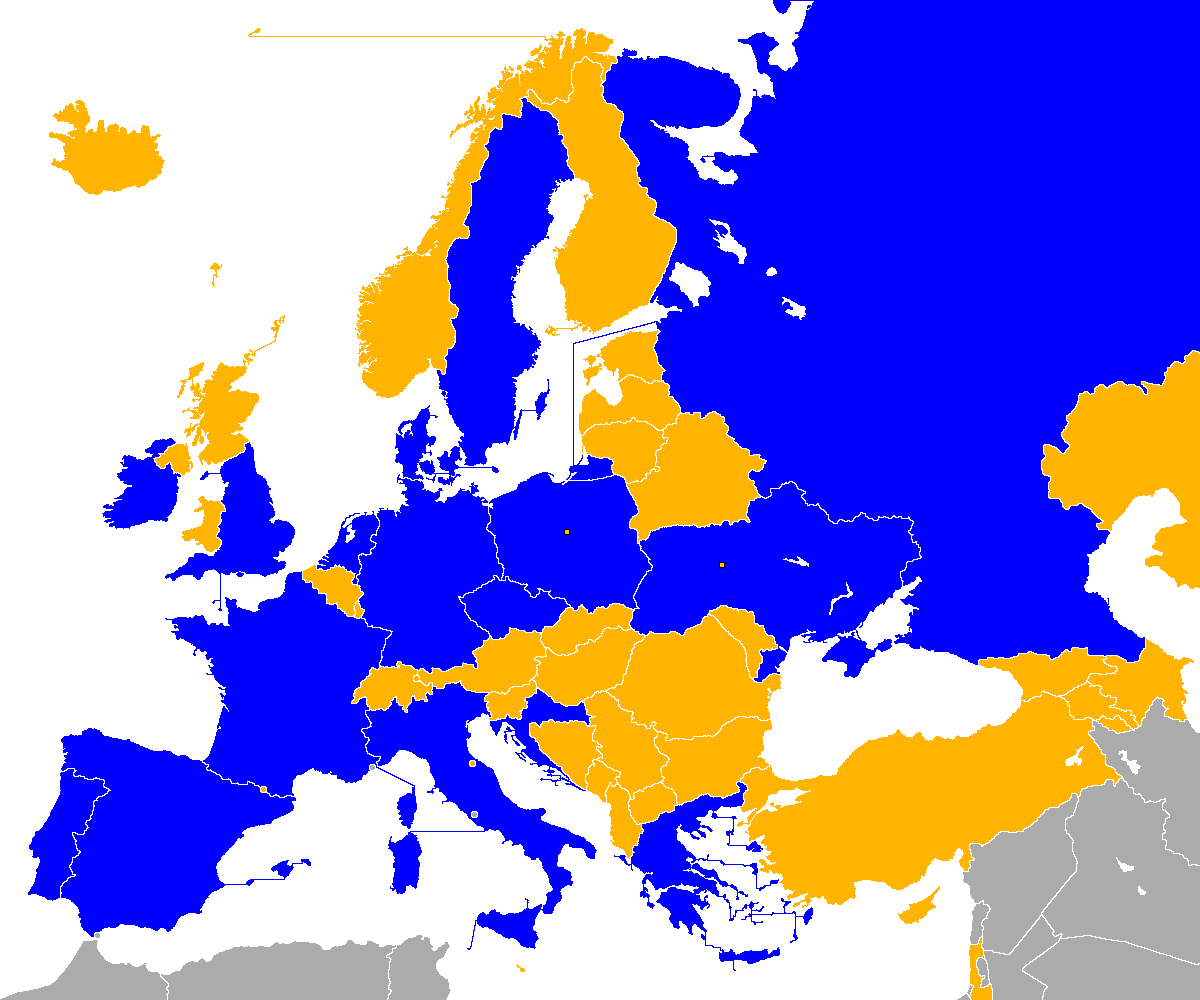
Euro 2012 qualifiers Qualified Did not qualify Did not enter Not a UEFA member

| Team | Qualified as | Qualified on | Previous appearances in tournament (Note: Bold indicates champion for that year. Italic indicates host for that year.) |
|---|---|---|---|
| Poland | Co-host | 18 April 2007 | 1 (2008) |
| Ukraine | Co-host | 18 April 2007 | 0 (debut) |
| Germany (Note: From 1972 to 1988, Germany competed as West Germany.) | Group A winner | 2 September 2011 | 10 (**1972**, 1976, **1980**, 1984, 1988, 1992, **1996**, 2000, 2004, 2008) |
| Italy | Group C winner | 6 September 2011 | 7 (**1968**, 1980, 1988, 1996, 2000, 2004, 2008) |
| Netherlands | Group E winner | 6 September 2011 | 8 (1976, 1980, **1988**, 1992, 1996, 2000, 2004, 2008) |
| Spain | Group I winner | 6 September 2011 | 8 (**1964**, 1980, 1984, 1988, 1996, 2000, 2004, **2008**) |
| England | Group G winner | 7 October 2011 | 7 (1968, 1980, 1988, 1992, 1996, 2000, 2004) |
| Russia (Note: From 1960 to 1988, Russia competed as the Soviet Union, and in 1992 as CIS.) | Group B winner | 11 October 2011 | 9 (**1960**, 1964, 1968, 1972, 1988, 1992, 1996, 2004, 2008) |
| France | Group D winner | 11 October 2011 | 7 (1960, **1984**, 1992, 1996, **2000**, 2004, 2008) |
| Greece | Group F winner | 11 October 2011 | 3 (1980, **2004**, 2008) |
| Denmark | Group H winner | 11 October 2011 | 7 (1964, 1984, 1988, **1992**, 1996, 2000, 2004) |
| Sweden | Best runner-up | 11 October 2011 | 4 (1992, 2000, 2004, 2008) |
| Croatia | Play-off winner | 15 November 2011 | 3 (1996, 2004, 2008) |
| Czech Republic (Note: From 1960 to 1980, the Czech Republic competed as Czechoslovakia.) | Play-off winner | 15 November 2011 | 7 (1960, **1976**, 1980, 1996, 2000, 2004, 2008) |
| Portugal | Play-off winner | 15 November 2011 | 5 (1984, 1996, 2000, 2004, 2008) |
| Republic of Ireland | Play-off winner | 15 November 2011 | 1 (1988) |

== Seedings ==
The pot allocations for the qualifying group stage draw were based on the UEFA national team coefficient rankings as of the end of 2009. The sole exception was the automatic placement of Spain, as reigning European champions, as the top-ranked team (their coefficient ranking would have also placed them in this position anyway). Each nation's coefficient was generated by calculating:

- 40% of the average ranking points per game earned in the 2010 FIFA World Cup qualifying stage;
- 40% of the average ranking points per game earned in the UEFA Euro 2008 qualifying stage and final tournament;
- 20% of the average ranking points per game earned in the 2006 FIFA World Cup qualifying stage and final tournament.

The 51 entrants were divided into the following six pots for the drawing of nine qualifying groups on 7 February 2010 in Warsaw, Poland:

Pot 1
| Team | Coeff | Rank |
|---|---|---|
| Spain (title holders) | 39,964 | 1 |
| Germany | 38,294 | 2 |
| Netherlands | 37,821 | 3 |
| Italy | 35,838 | 4 |
| England | 34,819 | 5 |
| Croatia | 33,677 | 6 |
| Portugal | 33,226 | 7 |
| France | 32,551 | 8 |
| Russia | 32,477 | 9 |

Pot 4
| Team | Coeff | Rank |
|---|---|---|
| Slovenia | 24,221 | 30 |
| Latvia | 23,303 | 31 |
| Hungary | 23,048 | 32 |
| Lithuania | 22,071 | 33 |
| Belarus | 21,515 | 34 |
| Belgium | 21,426 | 35 |
| Wales | 21,274 | 36 |
| Macedonia | 19,409 | 37 |
| Cyprus | 18,791 | 38 |

Pot 2
| Team | Coeff | Rank |
|---|---|---|
| Greece | 31,268 | 10 |
| Czech Republic | 30,871 | 11 |
| Sweden | 30,695 | 12 |
| Switzerland | 30,395 | 13 |
| Serbia | 29,811 | 14 |
| Turkey | 29,447 | 15 |
| Denmark | 29,222 | 16 |
| Slovakia | 28,228 | 17 |
| Romania | 28,145 | 18 |

Pot 5
| Team | Coeff | Rank |
|---|---|---|
| Montenegro | 18,751 | 39 |
| Albania | 18,319 | 40 |
| Estonia | 17,792 | 41 |
| Georgia | 15,819 | 42 |
| Moldova | 15,734 | 43 |
| Iceland | 15,404 | 44 |
| Armenia | 15,164 | 45 |
| Kazakhstan | 14,730 | 46 |
| Liechtenstein | 13,581 | 47 |

Pot 3
| Team | Coeff | Rank |
|---|---|---|
| Israel | 28,052 | 20 |
| Bulgaria | 27,198 | 21 |
| Finland | 26,827 | 22 |
| Norway | 26,210 | 24 |
| Republic of Ireland | 25,971 | 25 |
| Scotland | 25,646 | 26 |
| Northern Ireland | 24,518 | 27 |
| Austria | 24,381 | 28 |
| Bosnia and Herzegovina | 24,365 | 29 |

Pot 6
| Team | Coeff | Rank |
|---|---|---|
| Azerbaijan | 13,500 | 48 |
| Luxembourg | 11,872 | 49 |
| Malta | 11,517 | 50 |
| Faroe Islands | 10,620 | 51 |
| Andorra | 9,197 | 52 |
| San Marino | 7,783 | 53 |

Notes

- The co-hosts Ukraine and Poland, which qualified automatically, were ranked 19th (28,133) and 23rd (26,620) respectively.

Before the draw UEFA confirmed that, for political reasons, Armenia would not be drawn against Azerbaijan (due to the dispute concerning territory of Nagorno-Karabakh) and Georgia would not be drawn against Russia (due to the dispute regarding the territory of South Ossetia).

Armenia and Azerbaijan were drawn together in Group A during the draw ceremony, forcing UEFA to reassign Armenia to Group B, as Azerbaijan had refused to play in Armenia when they had been drawn together during UEFA Euro 2008 qualifying.

== Tiebreakers ==
If two or more teams were equal on points on completion of the group matches, the following criteria were applied to determine the rankings.

1. higher number of points obtained in the group matches played among the teams in question;
2. superior goal difference from the group matches played among the teams in question;
3. higher number of goals scored in the group matches played among the teams in question;
4. higher number of goals scored away from home in the group matches played among the teams in question;
5. if, after applying criteria 1) to 4) to several teams, two or more teams still had an equal ranking, the criteria 1) to 4) was reapplied to determine the ranking of these teams. If this procedure did not lead to a decision, criteria 6) to 10) applied;
6. superior goal difference in all group matches;
7. higher number of goals scored in all group matches;
8. higher number of goals scored away from home in all group matches;
9. fair play ranking in all group matches;
10. drawing of lots.

== Summary ==
Group winners and the best ranked runner-up qualified directly for UEFA Euro 2012
The remaining runners-up advanced to the play-offs
Other teams were eliminated after the qualifying group stage

| Group A | Group B | Group C | Group D | Group E | Group F | Group G | Group H | Group I |
|---|---|---|---|---|---|---|---|---|
| Germany | Russia | Italy | France | Netherlands | Greece | England | Denmark | Spain |
| Turkey | Republic of Ireland | Estonia | Bosnia and Herzegovina | Sweden | Croatia | Montenegro | Portugal | Czech Republic |
| Belgium Austria Azerbaijan Kazakhstan | Armenia Slovakia Macedonia Andorra | Serbia Slovenia Northern Ireland Faroe Islands | Romania Belarus Albania Luxembourg | Hungary Finland Moldova San Marino | Israel Latvia Georgia Malta | Switzerland Wales Bulgaria | Norway Iceland Cyprus | Scotland Lithuania Liechtenstein |

== Groups ==
The following 18 dates were reserved for group matches in qualifying:

- 3–4 and 7 September 2010
- 8–9 and 12 October 2010
- 25–26 and 29 March 2011
- 3–4 and 7 June 2011
- 2–3 and 6 September 2011
- 7–8 and 11 October 2011

For the first time, Tuesday evenings replaced Wednesday evenings for midweek qualifying fixtures where two matchdays occurred in the same week. This was in order to allow players an extra day to return to their clubs for domestic duty the following week. Consequently, teams were permitted to move the earlier weekend match forward to the Friday evening.

=== Group A ===
| Pos | Team | Pld | W | D | L | GF | GA | GD | Pts | Qualification | (Germany) | (Turkey) | (Belgium) | (Austria) | (Azerbaijan) | (Kazakhstan) |
|---|---|---|---|---|---|---|---|---|---|---|---|---|---|---|---|---|
| 1 | Germany | 10 | 10 | 0 | 0 | 34 | 7 | +27 | 30 | Qualify for final tournament | — | 3–0 | 3–1 | 6–2 | 6–1 | 4–0 |
| 2 | Turkey | 10 | 5 | 2 | 3 | 13 | 11 | +2 | 17 | Advance to play-offs | 1–3 | — | 3–2 | 2–0 | 1–0 | 2–1 |
| 3 | Belgium | 10 | 4 | 3 | 3 | 21 | 15 | +6 | 15 | | 0–1 | 1–1 | — | 4–4 | 4–1 | 4–1 |
| 4 | Austria | 10 | 3 | 3 | 4 | 16 | 17 | −1 | 12 | | 1–2 | 0–0 | 0–2 | — | 3–0 | 2–0 |
| 5 | Azerbaijan | 10 | 2 | 1 | 7 | 10 | 26 | −16 | 7 | | 1–3 | 1–0 | 1–1 | 1–4 | — | 3–2 |
| 6 | Kazakhstan | 10 | 1 | 1 | 8 | 6 | 24 | −18 | 4 | | 0–3 | 0–3 | 0–2 | 0–0 | 2–1 | — |

Source: UEFA

=== Group B ===
| Pos | Team | Pld | W | D | L | GF | GA | GD | Pts | Qualification | (Russia) | (Republic of Ireland) | (Armenia) | (Slovakia) | (North Macedonia) | (Andorra) |
|---|---|---|---|---|---|---|---|---|---|---|---|---|---|---|---|---|
| 1 | Russia | 10 | 7 | 2 | 1 | 17 | 4 | +13 | 23 | Qualify for final tournament | — | 0–0 | 3–1 | 0–1 | 1–0 | 6–0 |
| 2 | Republic of Ireland | 10 | 6 | 3 | 1 | 15 | 7 | +8 | 21 | Advance to play-offs | 2–3 | — | 2–1 | 0–0 | 2–1 | 3–1 |
| 3 | Armenia | 10 | 5 | 2 | 3 | 22 | 10 | +12 | 17 | | 0–0 | 0–1 | — | 3–1 | 4–1 | 4–0 |
| 4 | Slovakia | 10 | 4 | 3 | 3 | 7 | 10 | −3 | 15 | | 0–1 | 1–1 | 0–4 | — | 1–0 | 1–0 |
| 5 | Macedonia | 10 | 2 | 2 | 6 | 8 | 14 | −6 | 8 | | 0–1 | 0–2 | 2–2 | 1–1 | — | 1–0 |
| 6 | Andorra | 10 | 0 | 0 | 10 | 1 | 25 | −24 | 0 | | 0–2 | 0–2 | 0–3 | 0–1 | 0–2 | — |

Source: UEFA

=== Group C ===
| Pos | Team | Pld | W | D | L | GF | GA | GD | Pts | Qualification | (Italy) | (Estonia) | (Serbia) | (Slovenia) | (Northern Ireland) | (Faroe Islands) |
|---|---|---|---|---|---|---|---|---|---|---|---|---|---|---|---|---|
| 1 | Italy | 10 | 8 | 2 | 0 | 20 | 2 | +18 | 26 | Qualify for final tournament | — | 3–0 | 3–0 (Note: The Italy v Serbia match was abandoned at 0–0 after six minutes due to rioting by Serbian fans. The UEFA Control and Disciplinary Body awarded the match as a 3–0 forfeit win to Italy.) | 1–0 | 3–0 | 5–0 |
| 2 | Estonia | 10 | 5 | 1 | 4 | 15 | 14 | +1 | 16 | Advance to play-offs | 1–2 | — | 1–1 | 0–1 | 4–1 | 2–1 |
| 3 | Serbia | 10 | 4 | 3 | 3 | 13 | 12 | +1 | 15 | | 1–1 | 1–3 | — | 1–1 | 2–1 | 3–1 |
| 4 | Slovenia | 10 | 4 | 2 | 4 | 11 | 7 | +4 | 14 | | 0–1 | 1–2 | 1–0 | — | 0–1 | 5–1 |
| 5 | Northern Ireland | 10 | 2 | 3 | 5 | 9 | 13 | −4 | 9 | | 0–0 | 1–2 | 0–1 | 0–0 | — | 4–0 |
| 6 | Faroe Islands | 10 | 1 | 1 | 8 | 6 | 26 | −20 | 4 | | 0–1 | 2–0 | 0–3 | 0–2 | 1–1 | — |

Source: UEFA

=== Group D ===
| Pos | Team | Pld | W | D | L | GF | GA | GD | Pts | Qualification | (France) | (Bosnia and Herzegovina) | (Romania) | (Belarus) | (Albania) | (Luxembourg) |
|---|---|---|---|---|---|---|---|---|---|---|---|---|---|---|---|---|
| 1 | France | 10 | 6 | 3 | 1 | 15 | 4 | +11 | 21 | Qualify for final tournament | — | 1–1 | 2–0 | 0–1 | 3–0 | 2–0 |
| 2 | Bosnia and Herzegovina | 10 | 6 | 2 | 2 | 17 | 8 | +9 | 20 | Advance to play-offs | 0–2 | — | 2–1 | 1–0 | 2–0 | 5–0 |
| 3 | Romania | 10 | 3 | 5 | 2 | 13 | 9 | +4 | 14 | | 0–0 | 3–0 | — | 2–2 | 1–1 | 3–1 |
| 4 | Belarus | 10 | 3 | 4 | 3 | 8 | 7 | +1 | 13 | | 1–1 | 0–2 | 0–0 | — | 2–0 | 2–0 |
| 5 | Albania | 10 | 2 | 3 | 5 | 7 | 14 | −7 | 9 | | 1–2 | 1–1 | 1–1 | 1–0 | — | 1–0 |
| 6 | Luxembourg | 10 | 1 | 1 | 8 | 3 | 21 | −18 | 4 | | 0–2 | 0–3 | 0–2 | 0–0 | 2–1 | — |

Source: UEFA

=== Group E ===
| Pos | Team | Pld | W | D | L | GF | GA | GD | Pts | Qualification | (Netherlands) | (Sweden) | (Hungary) | (Finland) | (Moldova) | (San Marino) |
|---|---|---|---|---|---|---|---|---|---|---|---|---|---|---|---|---|
| 1 | Netherlands | 10 | 9 | 0 | 1 | 37 | 8 | +29 | 27 | Qualify for final tournament | — | 4–1 | 5–3 | 2–1 | 1–0 | 11–0 |
| 2 | Sweden | 10 | 8 | 0 | 2 | 31 | 11 | +20 | 24 | Qualify for final tournament | 3–2 | — | 2–0 | 5–0 | 2–1 | 6–0 |
| 3 | Hungary | 10 | 6 | 1 | 3 | 22 | 14 | +8 | 19 | | 0–4 | 2–1 | — | 0–0 | 2–1 | 8–0 |
| 4 | Finland | 10 | 3 | 1 | 6 | 16 | 16 | 0 | 10 | | 0–2 | 1–2 | 1–2 | — | 4–1 | 8–0 |
| 5 | Moldova | 10 | 3 | 0 | 7 | 12 | 16 | −4 | 9 | | 0–1 | 1–4 | 0–2 | 2–0 | — | 4–0 |
| 6 | San Marino | 10 | 0 | 0 | 10 | 0 | 53 | −53 | 0 | | 0–5 | 0–5 | 0–3 | 0–1 | 0–2 | — |

Source: UEFA

=== Group F ===
| Pos | Team | Pld | W | D | L | GF | GA | GD | Pts | Qualification | (Greece) | (Croatia) | (Israel) | (Latvia) | (Georgia (country)) | (Malta) |
|---|---|---|---|---|---|---|---|---|---|---|---|---|---|---|---|---|
| 1 | Greece | 10 | 7 | 3 | 0 | 14 | 5 | +9 | 24 | Qualify for final tournament | — | 2–0 | 2–1 | 1–0 | 1–1 | 3–1 |
| 2 | Croatia | 10 | 7 | 1 | 2 | 18 | 7 | +11 | 22 | Advance to play-offs | 0–0 | — | 3–1 | 2–0 | 2–1 | 3–0 |
| 3 | Israel | 10 | 5 | 1 | 4 | 13 | 11 | +2 | 16 | | 0–1 | 1–2 | — | 2–1 | 1–0 | 3–1 |
| 4 | Latvia | 10 | 3 | 2 | 5 | 9 | 12 | −3 | 11 | | 1–1 | 0–3 | 1–2 | — | 1–1 | 2–0 |
| 5 | Georgia | 10 | 2 | 4 | 4 | 7 | 9 | −2 | 10 | | 1–2 | 1–0 | 0–0 | 0–1 | — | 1–0 |
| 6 | Malta | 10 | 0 | 1 | 9 | 4 | 21 | −17 | 1 | | 0–1 | 1–3 | 0–2 | 0–2 | 1–1 | — |

Source: UEFA

=== Group G ===
| Pos | Team | Pld | W | D | L | GF | GA | GD | Pts | Qualification | (England) | (Montenegro) | (Switzerland) | (Wales) | (Bulgaria) |
|---|---|---|---|---|---|---|---|---|---|---|---|---|---|---|---|
| 1 | England | 8 | 5 | 3 | 0 | 17 | 5 | +12 | 18 | Qualify for final tournament | — | 0–0 | 2–2 | 1–0 | 4–0 |
| 2 | Montenegro | 8 | 3 | 3 | 2 | 7 | 7 | 0 | 12 | Advance to play-offs | 2–2 | — | 1–0 | 1–0 | 1–1 |
| 3 | Switzerland | 8 | 3 | 2 | 3 | 12 | 10 | +2 | 11 | | 1–3 | 2–0 | — | 4–1 | 3–1 |
| 4 | Wales | 8 | 3 | 0 | 5 | 6 | 10 | −4 | 9 | | 0–2 | 2–1 | 2–0 | — | 0–1 |
| 5 | Bulgaria | 8 | 1 | 2 | 5 | 3 | 13 | −10 | 5 | | 0–3 | 0–1 | 0–0 | 0–1 | — |

Source: UEFA

=== Group H ===
| Pos | Team | Pld | W | D | L | GF | GA | GD | Pts | Qualification | (Denmark) | (Portugal) | (Norway) | (Iceland) | (Cyprus) |
|---|---|---|---|---|---|---|---|---|---|---|---|---|---|---|---|
| 1 | Denmark | 8 | 6 | 1 | 1 | 15 | 6 | +9 | 19 | Qualify for final tournament | — | 2–1 | 2–0 | 1–0 | 2–0 |
| 2 | Portugal | 8 | 5 | 1 | 2 | 21 | 12 | +9 | 16 (Note: Tied on head-to-head results. Overall goal difference was used as the tiebreaker.) | Advance to play-offs | 3–1 | — | 1–0 | 5–3 | 4–4 |
| 3 | Norway | 8 | 5 | 1 | 2 | 10 | 7 | +3 | 16 | | 1–1 | 1–0 | — | 1–0 | 3–1 |
| 4 | Iceland | 8 | 1 | 1 | 6 | 6 | 14 | −8 | 4 | | 0–2 | 1–3 | 1–2 | — | 1–0 |
| 5 | Cyprus | 8 | 0 | 2 | 6 | 7 | 20 | −13 | 2 | | 1–4 | 0–4 | 1–2 | 0–0 | — |

Source: UEFA

=== Group I ===
| Pos | Team | Pld | W | D | L | GF | GA | GD | Pts | Qualification | (Spain) | (Czech Republic) | (Scotland) | (Lithuania) | (Liechtenstein) |
|---|---|---|---|---|---|---|---|---|---|---|---|---|---|---|---|
| 1 | Spain | 8 | 8 | 0 | 0 | 26 | 6 | +20 | 24 | Qualify for final tournament | — | 2–1 | 3–1 | 3–1 | 6–0 |
| 2 | Czech Republic | 8 | 4 | 1 | 3 | 12 | 8 | +4 | 13 | Advance to play-offs | 0–2 | — | 1–0 | 0–1 | 2–0 |
| 3 | Scotland | 8 | 3 | 2 | 3 | 9 | 10 | −1 | 11 | | 2–3 | 2–2 | — | 1–0 | 2–1 |
| 4 | Lithuania | 8 | 1 | 2 | 5 | 4 | 13 | −9 | 5 | | 1–3 | 1–4 | 0–0 | — | 0–0 |
| 5 | Liechtenstein | 8 | 1 | 1 | 6 | 3 | 17 | −14 | 4 | | 0–4 | 0–2 | 0–1 | 2–0 | — |

Source: UEFA

=== Ranking of second-placed teams ===
The highest ranked second placed team from the groups qualified automatically for the tournament, while the remainder entered the play-offs. As six groups contained six teams and three with five, matches against the sixth-placed team in each group were not included in this ranking. As a result, a total of eight matches played by each team counted toward the purpose of the second-placed ranking table.

| Pos | Grp | Team | Pld | W | D | L | GF | GA | GD | Pts | Qualification |
|---|---|---|---|---|---|---|---|---|---|---|---|
| 1 | E | Sweden | 8 | 6 | 0 | 2 | 20 | 11 | +9 | 18 | Qualify for final tournament |
| 2 | H | Portugal | 8 | 5 | 1 | 2 | 21 | 12 | +9 | 16 | Advance to play-offs |
| 3 | F | Croatia | 8 | 5 | 1 | 2 | 12 | 6 | +6 | 16 | Advance to play-offs |
| 4 | B | Republic of Ireland | 8 | 4 | 3 | 1 | 10 | 6 | +4 | 15 | Advance to play-offs |
| 5 | D | Bosnia and Herzegovina | 8 | 4 | 2 | 2 | 9 | 8 | +1 | 14 | Advance to play-offs |
| 6 | I | Czech Republic | 8 | 4 | 1 | 3 | 12 | 8 | +4 | 13 | Advance to play-offs |
| 7 | C | Estonia | 8 | 4 | 1 | 3 | 13 | 11 | +2 | 13 | Advance to play-offs |
| 8 | G | Montenegro | 8 | 3 | 3 | 2 | 7 | 7 | 0 | 12 | Advance to play-offs |
| 9 | A | Turkey | 8 | 3 | 2 | 3 | 8 | 10 | −2 | 11 | Advance to play-offs |

Source: UEFA
Rules for classification: Counting only matches against teams ranked first to fifth in the group, 1) Points; 2) Goal difference; 3) Goals scored; 4) Away goals scored; 5) UEFA national team coefficient ranking; 6) Lower disciplinary points total; 7) Drawing of lots.

== Play-offs ==
The eight remaining second-placed teams contested two-legged play-offs to determine the last four qualifiers for the finals. The teams were seeded for the play-off draw according to the UEFA national team coefficient rankings updated after the completion of the qualifying group stage. The draw for the play-offs was held on 13 October 2011 in Kraków, Poland.

=== Seedings ===
The seedings were as follows:

Pot 1 (seeded)
| Team | Coeff | Rank |
|---|---|---|
| Croatia | 32.723 | 7 |
| Portugal | 31.202 | 11 |
| Republic of Ireland | 28.203 | 13 |
| Czech Republic | 27.982 | 15 |

Pot 2 (unseeded)
| Team | Coeff | Rank |
|---|---|---|
| Turkey | 27.601 | 18 |
| Bosnia and Herzegovina | 27.199 | 19 |
| Montenegro | 21.876 | 35 |
| Estonia | 20.355 | 37 |

=== Matches ===
The first legs were played on 11 November, and the second legs were played on 15 November 2011. The four play-off winners qualified for the final tournament.

| Team 1 | Agg. | Team 2 | 1st leg | 2nd leg |
|---|---|---|---|---|
| Turkey | 0–3 | Croatia | 0–3 | 0–0 |
| Estonia | 1–5 | Republic of Ireland | 0–4 | 1–1 |
| Czech Republic | 3–0 | Montenegro | 2–0 | 1–0 |
| Bosnia and Herzegovina | 2–6 | Portugal | 0–0 | 2–6 |

== Goalscorers ==
There were 665 goals scored in 248 matches, for an average of 2.68 goals per match.

12 goals

- (Netherlands national football team) Klaas-Jan Huntelaar

9 goals

- (Germany national football team) Miroslav Klose

7 goals

- (Finland national football team) Mikael Forssell
- (Portugal national football team) Cristiano Ronaldo
- (Republic of Ireland national football team) Robbie Keane
- (Spain national football team) David Villa

6 goals

- (Armenia national football team) Henrikh Mkhitaryan
- (Estonia national football team) Konstantin Vassiljev
- (Germany national football team) Mario Gómez
- (Hungary national football team) Gergely Rudolf
- (Italy national football team) Antonio Cassano
- (Netherlands national football team) Dirk Kuyt
- (Netherlands national football team) Robin van Persie

5 goals

- (Armenia national football team) Gevorg Ghazaryan
- (Belgium national football team) Marvin Ogunjimi
- (Germany national football team) Mesut Özil
- (Portugal national football team) Nani
- (Portugal national football team) Hélder Postiga
- (Romania national football team) Adrian Mutu
- (Slovenia national football team) Tim Matavž
- (Sweden men's national football team) Zlatan Ibrahimović

4 goals

- (Armenia national football team) Yura Movsisyan
- (Armenia national football team) Marcos Pizzelli
- (Austria national football team) Marko Arnautović
- (Bosnia and Herzegovina national football team) Edin Džeko
- (Bosnia and Herzegovina national football team) Zvjezdan Misimović
- (Croatia national football team) Niko Kranjčar
- (Czech Republic national football team) Michal Kadlec
- (Finland national football team) Kasper Hämäläinen
- (Hungary national football team) Ádám Szalai
- (Israel national football team) Yossi Benayoun
- (Latvia national football team) Aleksandrs Cauņa
- (Moldova national football team) Alexandru Suvorov
- (Russia national football team) Alan Dzagoev
- (Russia national football team) Roman Pavlyuchenko
- (Spain national football team) David Silva
- (Switzerland national football team) Xherdan Shaqiri
- (Turkey national football team) Arda Turan

3 goals

- (Albania national football team) Hamdi Salihi
- (Belgium national football team) Timmy Simons
- (Bosnia and Herzegovina national football team) Haris Medunjanin
- (Croatia national football team) Eduardo
- (Croatia national football team) Mario Mandžukić
- (Cyprus national football team) Ioannis Okkas
- (Denmark national football team) Nicklas Bendtner
- (Denmark national football team) Dennis Rommedahl
- (England national football team) Darren Bent
- (England national football team) Jermain Defoe
- (England national football team) Wayne Rooney
- (England national football team) Ashley Young
- (France national football team) Karim Benzema
- (France national football team) Yoann Gourcuff
- (France national football team) Florent Malouda
- (Germany national football team) Thomas Müller
- (Germany national football team) Lukas Podolski
- (Germany national football team) André Schürrle
- (Hungary national football team) Zoltán Gera
- (Hungary national football team) Vladimir Koman
- (Lithuania national football team) Darvydas Šernas
- (Malta national football team) Michael Mifsud
- (Netherlands national football team) Ibrahim Afellay
- (Netherlands national football team) Wesley Sneijder
- (Romania national football team) Ciprian Marica
- (Serbia national football team) Marko Pantelić
- (Serbia national football team) Nikola Žigić
- (Spain national football team) Fernando Llorente
- (Sweden men's national football team) Kim Källström
- (Sweden men's national football team) Sebastian Larsson
- (Sweden men's national football team) Christian Wilhelmsson
- (Turkey national football team) Burak Yılmaz
- (Wales national football team) Gareth Bale

2 goals

- (Albania national football team) Erjon Bogdani
- (Armenia national football team) Artur Sarkisov
- (Austria national football team) Martin Harnik
- (Austria national football team) Marc Janko
- (Austria national football team) Franz Schiemer
- (Azerbaijan national football team) Rauf Aliyev
- (Azerbaijan national football team) Vagif Javadov
- (Azerbaijan national football team) Vüqar Nadirov
- (Belarus national football team) Sergei Kornilenko
- (Belgium national football team) Marouane Fellaini
- (Belgium national football team) Daniel Van Buyten
- (Belgium national football team) Jelle Vossen
- (Belgium national football team) Axel Witsel
- (Bosnia and Herzegovina national football team) Vedad Ibišević
- (Bosnia and Herzegovina national football team) Miralem Pjanić
- (Bulgaria national football team) Ivelin Popov
- (Croatia national football team) Nikola Kalinić
- (Croatia national football team) Ivica Olić
- (Cyprus national football team) Andreas Avraam
- (Czech Republic national football team) Jaroslav Plašil
- (Czech Republic national football team) Jan Rezek
- (Denmark national football team) Michael Krohn-Dehli
- (England national football team) Adam Johnson
- (England national football team) Frank Lampard
- (Estonia national football team) Tarmo Kink
- (Estonia national football team) Kaimar Saag
- (Estonia national football team) Sergei Zenjov
- (Faroe Islands national football team) Fróði Benjaminsen
- (France national football team) Loïc Rémy
- (Georgia national football team) Jaba Kankava
- (Georgia national football team) David Siradze
- (Greece national football team) Giannis Fetfatzidis
- (Greece national football team) Kyriakos Papadopoulos
- (Greece national football team) Vasilis Torosidis
- (Hungary national football team) Balázs Dzsudzsák
- (Hungary national football team) Imre Szabics
- (Iceland national football team) Heiðar Helguson
- (Iceland national football team) Hallgrímur Jónasson
- (Italy national football team) Giampaolo Pazzini
- (Kazakhstan national football team) Sergey Gridin
- (Latvia national football team) Kaspars Gorkšs
- (North Macedonia national football team) Ilčo Naumoski
- (North Macedonia national football team) Vanche Shikov
- (Moldova national football team) Anatolie Doroș
- (Montenegro national football team) Mirko Vučinić
- (Montenegro national football team) Elsad Zverotić
- (Netherlands national football team) Ruud van Nistelrooy
- (Northern Ireland national football team) Steven Davis
- (Northern Ireland national football team) Paddy McCourt
- (Norway national football team) Mohammed Abdellaoue
- (Norway national football team) John Carew
- (Norway national football team) Erik Huseklepp
- (Portugal national football team) Hugo Almeida
- (Portugal national football team) Danny
- (Portugal national football team) Raul Meireles
- (Republic of Ireland national football team) Kevin Doyle
- (Republic of Ireland national football team) Aiden McGeady
- (Romania national football team) Gabriel Torje
- (Russia national football team) Aleksandr Kerzhakov
- (Russia national football team) Pavel Pogrebnyak
- (Scotland national football team) Kenny Miller
- (Scotland national football team) Steven Naismith
- (Serbia national football team) Zoran Tošić
- (Slovenia national football team) Milivoje Novaković
- (Spain national football team) Juan Mata
- (Spain national football team) Álvaro Negredo
- (Spain national football team) Fernando Torres
- (Spain national football team) Xavi
- (Sweden men's national football team) Johan Elmander
- (Sweden men's national football team) Andreas Granqvist
- (Sweden men's national football team) Martin Olsson
- (Sweden men's national football team) Ola Toivonen
- (Sweden men's national football team) Pontus Wernbloom
- (Switzerland national football team) Tranquillo Barnetta
- (Switzerland national football team) Valentin Stocker
- (Turkey national football team) Hamit Altıntop
- (Wales national football team) Aaron Ramsey

1 goal

- (Albania national football team) Klodian Duro
- (Albania national football team) Gjergji Muzaka
- (Andorra national football team) Cristian Martínez
- (Armenia national football team) Edgar Manucharyan
- (Austria national football team) Erwin Hoffer
- (Austria national football team) Andreas Ivanschitz
- (Austria national football team) Zlatko Junuzović
- (Austria national football team) Roland Linz
- (Austria national football team) Sebastian Prödl
- (Azerbaijan national football team) Ruslan Abışov
- (Azerbaijan national football team) Murad Hüseynov
- (Azerbaijan national football team) Rashad Sadygov
- (Azerbaijan national football team) Mahir Shukurov
- (Belarus national football team) Stanislaw Drahun
- (Belarus national football team) Syarhey Kislyak
- (Belarus national football team) Sergey Krivets
- (Belarus national football team) Anton Putsila
- (Belarus national football team) Vitali Rodionov
- (Belgium national football team) Nacer Chadli
- (Belgium national football team) Eden Hazard
- (Belgium national football team) Vincent Kompany
- (Belgium national football team) Nicolas Lombaerts
- (Belgium national football team) Jan Vertonghen
- (Bosnia and Herzegovina national football team) Senijad Ibričić
- (Bosnia and Herzegovina national football team) Darko Maletić
- (Bosnia and Herzegovina national football team) Sejad Salihović
- (Bosnia and Herzegovina national football team) Emir Spahić
- (Bulgaria national football team) Ivan Ivanov
- (Croatia national football team) Milan Badelj
- (Croatia national football team) Vedran Ćorluka
- (Croatia national football team) Dejan Lovren
- (Croatia national football team) Luka Modrić
- (Croatia national football team) Mladen Petrić
- (Croatia national football team) Darijo Srna
- (Croatia national football team) Ognjen Vukojević
- (Cyprus national football team) Efstathios Aloneftis
- (Cyprus national football team) Michalis Konstantinou
- (Czech Republic national football team) Milan Baroš
- (Czech Republic national football team) Roman Hubník
- (Czech Republic national football team) Petr Jiráček
- (Czech Republic national football team) Václav Kadlec
- (Czech Republic national football team) Tomáš Necid
- (Czech Republic national football team) Václav Pilař
- (Czech Republic national football team) Tomáš Sivok
- (Denmark national football team) Christian Eriksen
- (Denmark national football team) Lars Jacobsen
- (Denmark national football team) Thomas Kahlenberg
- (Denmark national football team) Kasper Lorentzen
- (Denmark national football team) Morten Rasmussen
- (Denmark national football team) Lasse Schöne
- (England national football team) Gary Cahill
- (Estonia national football team) Raio Piiroja
- (Estonia national football team) Ats Purje
- (Estonia national football team) Martin Vunk
- (Faroe Islands national football team) Jóan Símun Edmundsson
- (Faroe Islands national football team) Arnbjørn Hansen
- (Faroe Islands national football team) Christian Holst
- (Faroe Islands national football team) Christian Mouritsen
- (Finland national football team) Jari Litmanen
- (Finland national football team) Roni Porokara
- (Finland national football team) Joona Toivio
- (Finland national football team) Mika Väyrynen
- (France national football team) Yann M'Vila
- (France national football team) Philippe Mexès
- (France national football team) Samir Nasri
- (France national football team) Anthony Réveillère
- (Georgia national football team) Aleksandre Iashvili
- (Georgia national football team) Levan Kobiashvili
- (Georgia national football team) David Targamadze
- (Germany national football team) Holger Badstuber
- (Germany national football team) Mario Götze
- (Germany national football team) Bastian Schweinsteiger
- (Germany national football team) Heiko Westermann
- (Greece national football team) Angelos Charisteas
- (Greece national football team) Georgios Fotakis
- (Greece national football team) Theofanis Gekas
- (Greece national football team) Giorgos Karagounis
- (Greece national football team) Sotiris Ninis
- (Greece national football team) Dimitris Salpingidis
- (Greece national football team) Georgios Samaras
- (Greece national football team) Nikos Spyropoulos
- (Hungary national football team) Zoltán Lipták
- (Hungary national football team) Vilmos Vanczák
- (Iceland national football team) Kolbeinn Sigþórsson
- (Iceland national football team) Gylfi Sigurðsson
- (Israel national football team) Elyaniv Barda
- (Israel national football team) Tal Ben Haim I
- (Israel national football team) Tal Ben Haim II
- (Israel national football team) Rami Gershon
- (Israel national football team) Tomer Hemed
- (Israel national football team) Beram Kayal
- (Israel national football team) Lior Refaelov
- (Israel national football team) Itay Shechter
- (Italy national football team) Leonardo Bonucci
- (Italy national football team) Daniele De Rossi
- (Italy national football team) Alberto Gilardino
- (Italy national football team) Claudio Marchisio
- (Italy national football team) Thiago Motta
- (Italy national football team) Andrea Pirlo
- (Italy national football team) Fabio Quagliarella
- (Italy national football team) Giuseppe Rossi
- (Kazakhstan national football team) Ulan Konysbayev
- (Kazakhstan national football team) Kairat Nurdauletov
- (Kazakhstan national football team) Sergei Ostapenko
- (Kazakhstan national football team) Vitali Yevstigneyev
- (Latvia national football team) Artjoms Rudņevs
- (Latvia national football team) Māris Verpakovskis
- (Latvia national football team) Aleksejs Višņakovs
- (Liechtenstein national football team) Philippe Erne
- (Liechtenstein national football team) Mario Frick
- (Liechtenstein national football team) Michele Polverino
- (Lithuania national football team) Marius Stankevičius
- (Luxembourg national football team) Gilles Bettmer
- (Luxembourg national football team) Lars Krogh Gerson
- (Luxembourg national football team) Aurélien Joachim
- (North Macedonia national football team) Mario Gjurovski
- (North Macedonia national football team) Mirko Ivanovski
- (North Macedonia national football team) Nikolče Noveski
- (North Macedonia national football team) Ivan Trichkovski
- (Malta national football team) Jamie Pace
- (Moldova national football team) Serghei Alexeev
- (Moldova national football team) Gheorghe Andronic
- (Moldova national football team) Igor Bugaiov
- (Moldova national football team) Nicolae Josan
- (Moldova national football team) Denis Zmeu
- (Montenegro national football team) Andrija Delibašić
- (Montenegro national football team) Radomir Đalović
- (Montenegro national football team) Stevan Jovetić
- (Netherlands national football team) Luuk de Jong
- (Netherlands national football team) John Heitinga
- (Netherlands national football team) Kevin Strootman
- (Netherlands national football team) Rafael van der Vaart
- (Netherlands national football team) Georginio Wijnaldum
- (Northern Ireland national football team) Corry Evans
- (Northern Ireland national football team) Aaron Hughes
- (Northern Ireland national football team) Kyle Lafferty
- (Northern Ireland national football team) Gareth McAuley
- (Norway national football team) Brede Hangeland
- (Norway national football team) Tom Høgli
- (Norway national football team) Morten Gamst Pedersen
- (Norway national football team) John Arne Riise
- (Portugal national football team) Eliseu
- (Portugal national football team) Manuel Fernandes
- (Portugal national football team) João Moutinho
- (Portugal national football team) Miguel Veloso
- (Republic of Ireland national football team) Keith Andrews
- (Republic of Ireland national football team) Richard Dunne
- (Republic of Ireland national football team) Keith Fahey
- (Republic of Ireland national football team) Kevin Kilbane
- (Republic of Ireland national football team) Shane Long
- (Republic of Ireland national football team) Sean St Ledger
- (Republic of Ireland national football team) Jonathan Walters
- (Republic of Ireland national football team) Stephen Ward
- (Romania national football team) Srdjan Luchin
- (Romania national football team) Bogdan Stancu
- (Romania national football team) Ianis Zicu
- (Russia national football team) Diniyar Bilyaletdinov
- (Russia national football team) Denis Glushakov
- (Russia national football team) Sergei Ignashevich
- (Russia national football team) Igor Semshov
- (Russia national football team) Roman Shirokov
- (Scotland national football team) Darren Fletcher
- (Scotland national football team) David Goodwillie
- (Scotland national football team) Craig Mackail-Smith
- (Scotland national football team) Stephen McManus
- (Serbia national football team) Branislav Ivanović
- (Serbia national football team) Milan Jovanović
- (Serbia national football team) Zdravko Kuzmanović
- (Serbia national football team) Danko Lazović
- (Serbia national football team) Dejan Stanković
- (Slovakia national football team) Ján Ďurica
- (Slovakia national football team) Filip Hološko
- (Slovakia national football team) Miroslav Karhan
- (Slovakia national football team) Juraj Piroska
- (Slovakia national football team) Filip Šebo
- (Slovakia national football team) Miroslav Stoch
- (Slovakia national football team) Vladimír Weiss
- (Slovenia national football team) Zlatko Dedić
- (Slovenia national football team) Dare Vršič
- (Spain national football team) Xabi Alonso
- (Spain national football team) Andrés Iniesta
- (Spain national football team) Sergio Ramos
- (Sweden men's national football team) Emir Bajrami
- (Sweden men's national football team) Marcus Berg
- (Sweden men's national football team) Alexander Gerndt
- (Sweden men's national football team) Tobias Hysén
- (Sweden men's national football team) Mikael Lustig
- (Switzerland national football team) Eren Derdiyok
- (Switzerland national football team) Gökhan Inler
- (Switzerland national football team) Stephan Lichtsteiner
- (Switzerland national football team) Marco Streller
- (Turkey national football team) Hakan Balta
- (Turkey national football team) Gökhan Gönül
- (Turkey national football team) Nihat Kahveci
- (Turkey national football team) Semih Şentürk
- (Wales national football team) Steve Morison

1 own goal

- (Armenia national football team) Valeri Aleksanyan (against Republic of Ireland)
- (Azerbaijan national football team) Rashad Sadygov (against Germany)
- (Estonia national football team) Raio Piiroja (against Northern Ireland)
- (Estonia national football team) Andrei Sidorenkov (against Slovenia)
- (Faroe Islands national football team) Rógvi Baldvinsson (against Slovenia)
- (France national football team) Eric Abidal (against Belarus)
- (Germany national football team) Arne Friedrich (against Austria)
- (Greece national football team) Nikos Spyropoulos (against Israel)
- (Lithuania national football team) Tadas Kijanskas (against Spain)
- (Moldova national football team) Igor Armaș (against Finland)
- (Northern Ireland national football team) Gareth McAuley (against Italy)
- (Portugal national football team) Ricardo Carvalho (against Denmark)
- (San Marino national football team) Simone Bacciocchi (against Moldova)
- (San Marino national football team) Aldo Junior Simoncini (against Sweden)
- (San Marino national football team) Davide Simoncini (against Sweden)
- (Serbia national football team) Aleksandar Luković (against Estonia)
- (Spain national football team) Gerard Piqué (against Scotland)
