= UEFA Euro 2012 qualifying Group F =

Football tournament qualifying stage

This page shows the standings and results for Group F of the UEFA Euro 2012 qualifying tournament.

== Standings ==
Pos	Team	Pld	W	D	L	GF	GA	GD	Pts	Qualification	(Greece)	(Croatia)	(Israel)	(Latvia)	(Georgia (country))	(Malta)
1	Greece	10	7	3	0	14	5	+9	24	Qualify for final tournament	—	2–0	2–1	1–0	1–1	3–1
2	Croatia	10	7	1	2	18	7	+11	22	Advance to play-offs	0–0	—	3–1	2–0	2–1	3–0
3	Israel	10	5	1	4	13	11	+2	16		0–1	1–2	—	2–1	1–0	3–1
4	Latvia	10	3	2	5	9	12	−3	11		1–1	0–3	1–2	—	1–1	2–0
5	Georgia	10	2	4	4	7	9	−2	10		1–2	1–0	0–0	0–1	—	1–0
6	Malta	10	0	1	9	4	21	−17	1		0–1	1–3	0–2	0–2	1–1	—

Source: UEFA
Rules for classification: Qualification tiebreakers

== Matches ==
Group F fixtures were to be finalised at a meeting between the participants in Athens, Greece on 7 March 2010. After that meeting proved inconclusive, the fixture list was determined by a random draw at the XXXIV Ordinary UEFA Congress in Tel Aviv, Israel, on 25 March.

2 September 2010
21:15 UTC+3

Israel	3–1	Malta
Benayoun 7', 64' (pen.), 75'	Report	Pace 38'

Ramat Gan Stadium, Ramat Gan
Attendance: 17,365
Referee: Saïd Ennjimi (France)
3 September 2010
21:00 UTC+3

Latvia	0–3	Croatia
	Report	Petrić 43'; Olić 51'; Srna 82'

Skonto Stadium, Riga
Attendance: 7,600
Referee: Björn Kuipers (Netherlands)
3 September 2010
21:45 UTC+3

Greece	1–1	Georgia
Spyropoulos 72'	Report	Iashvili 3'

Karaiskakis Stadium, Piraeus
Attendance: 14,794
Referee: Carlos Clos Gómez (Spain)

7 September 2010
21:00 UTC+4

Georgia	0–0	Israel
	Report

Boris Paichadze Stadium, Tbilisi
Attendance: 45,000
Referee: Sascha Kever (Switzerland)
7 September 2010
19:30 UTC+2

Malta	0–2	Latvia
	Report	Gorkšs 43'; Verpakovskis 85'

Ta'Qali Stadium, Ta'Qali
Attendance: 6,255
Referee: Tony Asumaa (Finland)
7 September 2010
20:30 UTC+2

Croatia	0–0	Greece
	Report

Maksimir Stadium, Zagreb
Attendance: 24,399
Referee: Claus Bo Larsen (Denmark)

8 October 2010
21:00 UTC+4

Georgia	1–0	Malta
Siradze 90+1'	Report

Boris Paichadze Stadium, Tbilisi
Attendance: 38,000
Referee: Alan Black (Northern Ireland)
8 October 2010
21:45 UTC+3

Greece	1–0	Latvia
Torosidis 58'	Report

Karaiskakis Stadium, Piraeus
Attendance: 13,520
Referee: Antonio Damato (Italy)
9 October 2010
20:30 UTC+3

Israel	1–2	Croatia
Shechter 81'	Report	Kranjčar 36' (pen.), 41'

Ramat Gan Stadium, Ramat Gan
Attendance: 33,421
Referee: Wolfgang Stark (Germany)

12 October 2010
20:00 UTC+3

Latvia	1–1	Georgia
Cauņa 90+1'	Report	Siradze 74'

Skonto Stadium, Riga
Attendance: 4,330
Referee: Manuel De Sousa (Portugal)
12 October 2010
21:45 UTC+3

Greece	2–1	Israel
Salpingidis 22'; Karagounis 63' (pen.)	Report	Spyropoulos 59' (o.g.)

Karaiskakis Stadium, Piraeus
Attendance: 16,935
Referee: Martin Hansson (Sweden)

17 November 2010
17:30 UTC+1

Croatia	3–0	Malta
Kranjčar 19', 42'; Kalinić 81'	Report

Stadion Maksimir, Zagreb
Attendance: 9,000
Referee: Duarte Gomes (Portugal)

26 March 2011
21:00 UTC+4

Georgia	1–0	Croatia
Kobiashvili 90'	Report

Boris Paichadze Stadium, Tbilisi
Attendance: 54,500
Referee: Paolo Tagliavento (Italy)
26 March 2011
21:00 UTC+2

Israel	2–1	Latvia
Barda 16'; Kayal 81'	Report	Gorkšs 62'

Bloomfield Stadium, Tel Aviv
Attendance: 10,801
Referee: Milorad Mažić (Serbia)
26 March 2011
20:30 UTC+1

Malta	0–1	Greece
	Report	Torosidis 90+4'

Ta'Qali Stadium, Ta'Qali
Attendance: 10,605
Referee: Michael Weiner (Germany)

29 March 2011
21:05 UTC+2

Israel	1–0	Georgia
Ben Haim II 59'	Report

Bloomfield Stadium, Tel Aviv
Attendance: 13,716
Referee: Fredy Fautrel (France)

3 June 2011
20:00 UTC+2

Croatia	2–1	Georgia
Mandžukić 76'; Kalinić 78'	Report	Kankava 17'

Stadion Poljud, Split
Attendance: 28,000
Referee: Stefan Johannesson (Sweden)

4 June 2011
19:30 UTC+3

Latvia	1–2	Israel
Cauņa 62' (pen.)	Report	Benayoun 19'; Ben Haim I 43' (pen.)

Skonto Stadium, Riga
Attendance: 6,147
Referee: Alan Kelly (Republic of Ireland)
4 June 2011
21:30 UTC+3

Greece	3–1	Malta
Fetfatzidis 8', 64'; K. Papadopoulos 26'	Report	Mifsud 54'

Karaiskakis Stadium, Piraeus
Attendance: 14,746
Referee: Pawel Gil (Poland)

2 September 2011
16:05 UTC+3

Israel	0–1	Greece
	Report	Ninis 60'

Bloomfield Stadium, Tel Aviv
Attendance: 13,100
Referee: Craig Thomson (Scotland)
2 September 2011
21:00 UTC+4

Georgia	0–1	Latvia
	Report	Cauņa 63'

Mikheil Meskhi Stadium, Tbilisi
Attendance: 15,422
Referee: Leontios Trattou (Cyprus)
2 September 2011
19:00 UTC+2

Malta	1–3	Croatia
Mifsud 38'	Report	Vukojević 11'; Badelj 32'; Lovren 68'

Ta'Qali Stadium, Ta'Qali
Attendance: 6,150
Referee: Tony Chapron (France)

6 September 2011
20:00 UTC+2

Croatia	3–1	Israel
Modrić 47'; Eduardo 55', 57'	Report	Hemed 44'

Stadion Maksimir, Zagreb
Attendance: 13,688
Referee: Carlos Velasco Carballo (Spain)
6 September 2011
20:30 UTC+2

Malta	1–1	Georgia
Mifsud 25'	Report	Kankava 15'

Ta'Qali Stadium, Ta'Qali
Attendance: 5,000
Referee: Pol van Boekel (Netherlands)
6 September 2011
21:30 UTC+3

Latvia	1–1	Greece
Cauņa 19'	Report	K. Papadopoulos 84'

Skonto Stadium, Riga
Attendance: 5,415
Referee: Stanislav Todorov (Bulgaria)

7 October 2011
20:00 UTC+3

Latvia	2–0	Malta
Višņakovs 33'; Rudņevs 83'	Report

Skonto Stadium, Riga
Attendance: 4,315
Referee: Richard Trutz (Slovakia)
7 October 2011
21:45 UTC+3

Greece	2–0	Croatia
Samaras 71'; Gekas 79'	Report

Karaiskakis Stadium, Piraeus
Attendance: 27,200
Referee: Howard Webb (England)

11 October 2011
21:00 UTC+4

Georgia	1–2	Greece
Targamadze 19'	Report	Fotakis 79'; Charisteas 85'

Mikheil Meskhi Stadium, Tbilisi
Attendance: 7,824
Referee: Daniele Orsato (Italy)
11 October 2011
19:00 UTC+2

Malta	0–2	Israel
	Report	Refaelov 11'; Gershon 90+3'

Ta'Qali Stadium, Ta'Qali
Attendance: 2,614
Referee: Bruno Paixão (Portugal)
11 October 2011
19:00 UTC+2

Croatia	2–0	Latvia
Eduardo 66'; Mandžukić 72'	Report

Stadion Kantrida, Rijeka
Attendance: 8,370
Referee: Antony Gautier (France)

== Goalscorers ==
There were 65 goals scored in 30 matches, for an average of 2.17 goals per match.

4 goals

- (Croatia national football team) Niko Kranjčar
- (Israel national football team) Yossi Benayoun
- (Latvia national football team) Aleksandrs Cauņa

3 goals

- (Croatia national football team) Eduardo
- (Malta national football team) Michael Mifsud

2 goals

- (Croatia national football team) Nikola Kalinić
- (Croatia national football team) Mario Mandžukić
- (Georgia national football team) Jaba Kankava
- (Georgia national football team) David Siradze
- (Greece national football team) Giannis Fetfatzidis
- (Greece national football team) Kyriakos Papadopoulos
- (Greece national football team) Vasilis Torosidis
- (Latvia national football team) Kaspars Gorkšs

1 goal

- (Croatia national football team) Milan Badelj
- (Croatia national football team) Dejan Lovren
- (Croatia national football team) Luka Modrić
- (Croatia national football team) Ivica Olić
- (Croatia national football team) Mladen Petrić
- (Croatia national football team) Darijo Srna
- (Croatia national football team) Ognjen Vukojević
- (Georgia national football team) Aleksandre Iashvili
- (Georgia national football team) Levan Kobiashvili
- (Georgia national football team) David Targamadze
- (Greece national football team) Angelos Charisteas
- (Greece national football team) Georgios Fotakis
- (Greece national football team) Theofanis Gekas
- (Greece national football team) Giorgos Karagounis
- (Greece national football team) Sotiris Ninis
- (Greece national football team) Dimitris Salpingidis
- (Greece national football team) Georgios Samaras
- (Greece national football team) Nikos Spyropoulos
- (Israel national football team) Elyaniv Barda
- (Israel national football team) Tal Ben Haim I
- (Israel national football team) Tal Ben Haim II
- (Israel national football team) Rami Gershon
- (Israel national football team) Tomer Hemed
- (Israel national football team) Beram Kayal
- (Israel national football team) Lior Refaelov
- (Israel national football team) Itay Shechter
- (Latvia national football team) Artjoms Rudņevs
- (Latvia national football team) Māris Verpakovskis
- (Latvia national football team) Aleksejs Višņakovs
- (Malta national football team) Jamie Pace

1 own goal

- (Greece national football team) Nikos Spyropoulos (against Israel)

== Discipline ==
Position	Player	Country	Yellow card	Red card	Suspended for match(es)	Reason
Defender	Tal Ben Haim I	Israel	2	1	vs Greece (12 October 2010) vs Malta (11 October 2011)	Booked in 2 UEFA Euro 2012 qualifying matches Sent off in a UEFA Euro 2012 qualifying match
Defender	Sokratis Papastathopoulos	Greece	0	1	vs Israel (2 September 2011)	Sent off in a UEFA Euro 2012 qualifying match
Defender	Darijo Srna	Croatia	4	0	vs Malta (17 November 2010) vs Latvia (11 October 2011)	Booked in 2 UEFA Euro 2012 qualifying matches
Forward	Māris Verpakovskis	Latvia	4	0	vs Greece (8 October 2010) vs Croatia (11 October 2011)	Booked in 2 UEFA Euro 2012 qualifying matches
Defender	Zurab Khizanishvili	Georgia	3	0	vs Slovakia (26 March 2011)	Booked in 2 UEFA Euro 2012 qualifying matches
Defender	Vasilis Torosidis	Greece	3	0	vs Israel (12 October 2010)	Booked in 2 UEFA Euro 2012 qualifying matches
Defender	Oskars Kļava	Latvia	3	0	vs Israel (26 March 2011)	Booked in 2 UEFA Euro 2012 qualifying matches
Defender	Andrei Agius	Malta	3	0	vs Israel (11 October 2011)	Booked in 2 UEFA Euro 2012 qualifying matches
Forward	Andrew Cohen	Malta	3	0	vs Georgia (8 October 2010)	Booked in 2 UEFA Euro 2012 qualifying matches
Forward	Nikola Kalinić	Croatia	2	0	vs Latvia (11 October 2011)	Booked in 2 UEFA Euro 2012 qualifying matches
Midfielder	Niko Kranjčar	Croatia	2	0	vs Georgia (3 June 2011)	Booked in 2 UEFA Euro 2012 qualifying matches
Midfielder	Ognjen Vukojević	Croatia	2	0	vs Malta (17 November 2010)	Booked in 2 UEFA Euro 2012 qualifying matches
Defender	Ucha Lobjanidze	Georgia	2	0	vs Malta (8 October 2010)	Booked in 2 UEFA Euro 2012 qualifying matches
Midfielder	Kostas Katsouranis	Greece	2	0	vs Latvia (6 September 2011)	Booked in 2 UEFA Euro 2012 qualifying matches
Midfielder	Giannis Maniatis	Greece	2	0	vs Croatia (7 October 2011)	Booked in 2 UEFA Euro 2012 qualifying matches
Defender	Avraam Papadopoulos	Greece	2	0	vs Georgia (11 October 2011)	Booked in 2 UEFA Euro 2012 qualifying matches
Forward	Giorgios Samaras	Greece	2	0	vs Georgia (11 October 2011)	Booked in 2 UEFA Euro 2012 qualifying matches
Midfielder	Alexandros Tziolis	Greece	2	0	vs Georgia (11 October 2011)	Booked in 2 UEFA Euro 2012 qualifying matches
Goalkeeper	Alexandros Tzorvas	Greece	2	0	vs Georgia (11 October 2011)	Booked in 2 UEFA Euro 2012 qualifying matches
Forward	Itay Shechter	Israel	2	0	vs Latvia (26 March 2011)	Booked in 2 UEFA Euro 2012 qualifying matches
Defender	Kaspars Gorkšs	Latvia	2	0	vs Greece (6 September 2011)	Booked in 2 UEFA Euro 2012 qualifying matches
Defender	Oskars Kļava	Latvia	2	0	vs Malta (2 September 2011)	Booked in 2 UEFA Euro 2012 qualifying matches
Defender	Ritus Krjauklis	Latvia	2	0	vs Malta (7 October 2011)	Booked in 2 UEFA Euro 2012 qualifying matches
Midfielder	Jurijs Zigajevs	Latvia	2	0	vs Malta (2 September 2011)	Booked in 2 UEFA Euro 2012 qualifying matches
Forward	Daniel Bogdanović	Malta	2	0	vs Georgia (8 October 2010)	Booked in 2 UEFA Euro 2012 qualifying matches
Forward	Andrew Cohen	Malta	2	0	vs Israel (11 October 2011)	Booked in 2 UEFA Euro 2012 qualifying matches
Defender	Clayton Failla	Malta	2	0	vs Israel (11 October 2011)	Booked in 2 UEFA Euro 2012 qualifying matches
