= UEFA Euro 2012 qualifying Group C =

Football tournament qualifying stage

This page shows the standings and results for Group C of the UEFA Euro 2012 qualifying tournament.

== Standings ==
Pos	Team	Pld	W	D	L	GF	GA	GD	Pts	Qualification	(Italy)	(Estonia)	(Serbia)	(Slovenia)	(Northern Ireland)	(Faroe Islands)
1	Italy	10	8	2	0	20	2	+18	26	Qualify for final tournament	—	3–0	3–0 (Note: The Italy v Serbia match was abandoned at 0–0 after six minutes due to rioting by Serbian fans. The UEFA Control and Disciplinary Body awarded the match as a 3–0 forfeit win to Italy.)	1–0	3–0	5–0
2	Estonia	10	5	1	4	15	14	+1	16	Advance to play-offs	1–2	—	1–1	0–1	4–1	2–1
3	Serbia	10	4	3	3	13	12	+1	15		1–1	1–3	—	1–1	2–1	3–1
4	Slovenia	10	4	2	4	11	7	+4	14		0–1	1–2	1–0	—	0–1	5–1
5	Northern Ireland	10	2	3	5	9	13	−4	9		0–0	1–2	0–1	0–0	—	4–0
6	Faroe Islands	10	1	1	8	6	26	−20	4		0–1	2–0	0–3	0–2	1–1	—

Source: UEFA
Rules for classification: Qualification tiebreakers

== Matches ==
Group C fixtures were negotiated between the participants in a meeting held in Belgrade on 8 March 2010.

11 August 2010
20:00 UTC+3

Estonia	2–1	Faroe Islands
Saag 90+1'; Piiroja 90+3'	Report	Edmundsson 28'

A. Le Coq Arena, Tallinn
Attendance: 5,470
Referee: Ante Vučemilović-Šimunović Jr. (Croatia)

3 September 2010
18:00 UTC+1

Faroe Islands	0–3	Serbia
	Report	Lazović 14'; Stanković 18'; Žigić 90+1'

Tórsvøllur, Tórshavn
Attendance: 1,847
Referee: Albert Toussaint (Luxembourg)
3 September 2010
21:30 UTC+3

Estonia	1–2	Italy
Zenjov 31'	Report	Cassano 60'; Bonucci 63'

A. Le Coq Arena, Tallinn
Attendance: 8,600
Referee: Carlos Velasco Carballo (Spain)
3 September 2010
20:45 UTC+2

Slovenia	0–1	Northern Ireland
	Report	C. Evans 70'

Ljudski vrt, Maribor
Attendance: 12,000
Referee: Cristian Balaj (Romania)

7 September 2010
20:30 UTC+2

Serbia	1–1	Slovenia
Žigić 86'	Report	Novaković 63'

Stadion Crvena Zvezda, Belgrade
Attendance: 24,028
Referee: Olegário Benquerença (Portugal)
7 September 2010
20:50 UTC+2

Italy	5–0	Faroe Islands
Gilardino 11'; De Rossi 22'; Cassano 27'; Quagliarella 81'; Pirlo 90'	Report

Stadio Artemio Franchi, Florence
Attendance: 19,266
Referee: Aleksei Kulbakov (Belarus)

8 October 2010
20:30 UTC+2

Serbia	1–3	Estonia
Žigić 60'	Report	Kink 63'; Vassiljev 73'; Luković 90+1' (o.g.)

Stadion FK Partizan, Belgrade
Attendance: 12,000
Referee: Maksim Layushkin (Russia)
8 October 2010
19:45 UTC+1

Northern Ireland	0–0	Italy
	Report

Windsor Park, Belfast
Attendance: 15,200
Referee: Tony Chapron (France)
8 October 2010
20:45 UTC+2

Slovenia	5–1	Faroe Islands
Matavž 25', 36', 66'; Novakovič 72' (pen.); Dedič 84'	Report	Mouritsen 90+3'

Stožice Stadium, Ljubljana
Attendance: 15,750
Referee: Stanislav Todorov (Bulgaria)

12 October 2010
16:00 UTC+1

Faroe Islands	1–1	Northern Ireland
Holst 60'	Report	Lafferty 76'

Svangaskarð, Toftir
Attendance: 1,921
Referee: Cyril Zimmermann (Switzerland)
12 October 2010
21:30 UTC+3

Estonia	0–1	Slovenia
	Report	Sidorenkov 66' (o.g.)

A. Le Coq Arena, Tallinn
Attendance: 5,722
Referee: Tommy Skjerven (Norway)
12 October 2010
21:30 UTC+2 (Note: The Italy v Serbia match, originally scheduled for 20:50 CEST, was delayed to 21:30 CEST.)

Italy	3–0 Awarded (Note: The Italy v Serbia match was abandoned after six minutes due to rioting by Serbian fans. The UEFA Control and Disciplinary Body awarded the match as a 3–0 forfeit win to Italy.)	Serbia
	Report

Stadio Luigi Ferraris, Genoa
Referee: Craig Thomson (Scotland)

25 March 2011
20:30 UTC+1

Serbia	2–1	Northern Ireland
Pantelić 65'; Tošić 74'	Report	McAuley 40'

Stadion Crvena Zvezda, Belgrade
Attendance: 350 (Note: As punishment for the crowd trouble at the abandoned Italy v Serbia match, Serbia was ordered to play its next home match against Northern Ireland behind closed doors, with another one-match crowd ban deferred for a probationary period of two years. Italy received a one-match crowd ban deferred for a probationary period of two years. However the Irish Football Association objected and as a result UEFA decreed that Serbia's game against Northern Ireland would only be allowed to have 200 Northern Irish fans attend it. Serbian fans were not allowed to visit the away game against Estonia.)
Referee: Serge Gumienny (Belgium)
25 March 2011
20:45 UTC+1

Slovenia	0–1	Italy
	Report	Motta 73'

Stožice Stadium, Ljubljana
Attendance: 15,790
Referee: Felix Brych (Germany)

29 March 2011
21:30 UTC+3

Estonia	1–1	Serbia
Vassiljev 84'	Report	Pantelić 38'

A. Le Coq Arena, Tallinn
Attendance: 5,185
Referee: Bas Nijhuis (Netherlands)
29 March 2011
19:45 UTC+1

Northern Ireland	0–0	Slovenia
	Report

Windsor Park, Belfast
Attendance: 14,200
Referee: Björn Kuipers (Netherlands)

3 June 2011
18:30 UTC+1

Faroe Islands	0–2	Slovenia
	Report	Matavž 29'; Baldvinsson 47' (o.g.)

Svangaskarð, Toftir
Attendance: 974
Referee: Oliver Drachta (Austria)
3 June 2011
20:50 UTC+2

Italy	3–0	Estonia
Rossi 21'; Cassano 39'; Pazzini 68'	Report

Stadio Alberto Braglia, Modena
Attendance: 19,434
Referee: Alexandru Dan Tudor (Romania)

7 June 2011
19:30 UTC+1

Faroe Islands	2–0	Estonia
Benjaminsen 43' (pen.); A. Hansen 47'	Report

Svangaskarð, Toftir
Attendance: 1,715
Referee: Antti Munukka (Finland)

10 August 2011
19:45 UTC+1

Northern Ireland	4–0	Faroe Islands
Hughes 5'; Davis 66'; McCourt 71', 87'	Report

Windsor Park, Belfast
Attendance: 13,183
Referee: Emir Alecković (Bosnia and Herzegovina)

2 September 2011
19:45 UTC+1

Faroe Islands	0–1	Italy
	Report	Cassano 11'

Tórsvøllur, Tórshavn
Attendance: 5,654
Referee: Tamás Bognár (Hungary)
2 September 2011
20:45 UTC+2

Slovenia	1–2	Estonia
Matavž 78'	Report	Vassiljev 29' (pen.); Purje 81'

Stožice Stadium, Ljubljana
Attendance: 15,480
Referee: Stephan Studer (Switzerland)
2 September 2011
19:45 UTC+1

Northern Ireland	0–1	Serbia
	Report	Pantelić 67'

Windsor Park, Belfast
Attendance: 15,148
Referee: Thomas Einwaller (Austria)

6 September 2011
20:30 UTC+2

Serbia	3–1	Faroe Islands
Jovanović 6'; Tošić 22'; Kuzmanović 69'	Report	Benjaminsen 37'

Stadion FK Partizan, Belgrade
Attendance: 7,500
Referee: Arman Amirkhanyan (Armenia)
6 September 2011
21:30 UTC+3

Estonia	4–1	Northern Ireland
Vunk 28'; Kink 32'; Zenjov 59'; Saag 90+3'	Report	Piiroja 40' (o.g.)

A. Le Coq Arena, Tallinn
Attendance: 8,660
Referee: Daniel Stålhammar (Sweden)
6 September 2011
20:45 UTC+2

Italy	1–0	Slovenia
Pazzini 85'	Report

Stadio Artemio Franchi, Florence
Attendance: 18,000
Referee: Svein Oddvar Moen (Norway)

7 October 2011
19:45 UTC+1

Northern Ireland	1–2	Estonia
Davis 22'	Report	Vassiljev 77' (pen.), 84'

Windsor Park, Belfast
Attendance: 12,604
Referee: Manuel Gräfe (Germany)
7 October 2011
20:45 UTC+2

Serbia	1–1	Italy
Ivanović 26'	Report	Marchisio 1'

Stadion Crvena Zvezda, Belgrade
Attendance: 35,000
Referee: Pedro Proença (Portugal)

11 October 2011
20:45 UTC+2

Italy	3–0	Northern Ireland
Cassano 21', 53'; McAuley 74' (o.g.)	Report

Stadio Adriatico, Pescara
Attendance: 19,480
Referee: Antonio Mateu Lahoz (Spain)
11 October 2011
20:45 UTC+2

Slovenia	1–0	Serbia
Vršič 45+1'	Report

Ljudski vrt, Maribor
Attendance: 9,848
Referee: Frank De Bleeckere (Belgium)

== Goalscorers ==
There were 71 goals scored in 30 matches, for an average of 2.37 goals per match. (Note: The goal tally takes into account the original result of fixtures that were subsequently forfeited, not the awarded scoreline.)

6 goals

- (Italy national football team) Antonio Cassano

5 goals

- (Estonia national football team) Konstantin Vassiljev
- (Slovenia national football team) Tim Matavž

3 goals

- (Serbia national football team) Marko Pantelić
- (Serbia national football team) Nikola Žigić

2 goals

- (Estonia national football team) Tarmo Kink
- (Estonia national football team) Kaimar Saag
- (Estonia national football team) Sergei Zenjov
- (Faroe Islands national football team) Fróði Benjaminsen
- (Italy national football team) Giampaolo Pazzini
- (Northern Ireland national football team) Steven Davis
- (Northern Ireland national football team) Paddy McCourt
- (Serbia national football team) Zoran Tošić
- (Slovenia national football team) Milivoje Novaković

1 goal

- (Estonia national football team) Raio Piiroja
- (Estonia national football team) Ats Purje
- (Estonia national football team) Martin Vunk
- (Faroe Islands national football team) Jóan Símun Edmundsson
- (Faroe Islands national football team) Arnbjørn Hansen
- (Faroe Islands national football team) Christian Holst
- (Faroe Islands national football team) Christian Mouritsen
- (Italy national football team) Leonardo Bonucci
- (Italy national football team) Daniele De Rossi
- (Italy national football team) Alberto Gilardino
- (Italy national football team) Claudio Marchisio
- (Italy national football team) Thiago Motta
- (Italy national football team) Andrea Pirlo
- (Italy national football team) Fabio Quagliarella
- (Italy national football team) Giuseppe Rossi
- (Northern Ireland national football team) Corry Evans
- (Northern Ireland national football team) Aaron Hughes
- (Northern Ireland national football team) Kyle Lafferty
- (Northern Ireland national football team) Gareth McAuley
- (Serbia national football team) Branislav Ivanović
- (Serbia national football team) Milan Jovanović
- (Serbia national football team) Zdravko Kuzmanović
- (Serbia national football team) Danko Lazović
- (Serbia national football team) Dejan Stanković
- (Slovenia national football team) Zlatko Dedić
- (Slovenia national football team) Dare Vršič

1 own goal

- (Estonia national football team) Raio Piiroja (against Northern Ireland)
- (Estonia national football team) Andrei Sidorenkov (against Slovenia)
- (Faroe Islands national football team) Rógvi Baldvinsson (against Slovenia)
- (Northern Ireland national football team) Gareth McAuley (against Italy)
- (Serbia national football team) Aleksandar Luković (against Estonia)

== Discipline ==
Pos	Player	Country	Yellow card	Red card	Suspended for match(es)	Reason
MF	Sander Puri	Estonia	2	1	vs Slovenia (2 September 2011)	Sent off in a UEFA Euro 2012 qualifying match
MF	Pól Jóhannus Justinussen	Faroe Islands	2	1	vs Northern Ireland (10 August 2011)	Sent off in a UEFA Euro 2012 qualifying match
DF	Marko Šuler	Slovenia	1	1	vs Estonia (2 September 2011)	Sent off in a UEFA Euro 2012 qualifying match
DF	Raio Piiroja	Estonia	3	0	vs Slovenia (12 October 2010)	Booked in 2 UEFA Euro 2012 qualifying matches
MF	Dejan Stanković	Serbia	3	0	vs Estonia (29 March 2011)	Booked in 2 UEFA Euro 2012 qualifying matches
DF	Boštjan Cesar	Slovenia	3	0	vs Northern Ireland (29 March 2011)	Booked in 2 UEFA Euro 2012 qualifying matches
MF	Aleksandr Dmitrijev	Estonia	2	0	vs Northern Ireland (6 September 2011)	Booked in 2 UEFA Euro 2012 qualifying matches
MF	Ragnar Klavan	Estonia	2	0	vs Faroe Islands (7 June 2011)	Booked in 2 UEFA Euro 2012 qualifying matches
DF	Taavi Rähn	Estonia	2	0	vs Northern Ireland (7 October 2011)	Booked in 2 UEFA Euro 2012 qualifying matches
MF	Konstantin Vassiljev	Estonia	2	0	vs Italy (3 June 2011)	Booked in 2 UEFA Euro 2012 qualifying matches
MF	Martin Vunk	Estonia	2	0	vs Faroe Islands (7 June 2011)	Booked in 2 UEFA Euro 2012 qualifying matches
FW	Sergei Zenjov	Estonia	2	0	vs Republic of Ireland (11 and 15 November 2011)	Booked in 2 UEFA Euro 2012 qualifying matches
DF	Atli Gregersen	Faroe Islands	2	0	vs Slovenia (3 June 2011)	Booked in 2 UEFA Euro 2012 qualifying matches
MF	Chris Brunt	Northern Ireland	2	0	vs Faroe Islands (10 August 2011)	Booked in 2 UEFA Euro 2012 qualifying matches
DF	Jonny Evans	Northern Ireland	2	0	vs Estonia (6 September 2011)	Booked in 2 UEFA Euro 2012 qualifying matches
FW	David Healy	Northern Ireland	2	0	vs Slovenia (29 March 2011)	Booked in 2 UEFA Euro 2012 qualifying matches
DF	Kyle Lafferty	Northern Ireland	2	0	vs Italy (11 October 2011)	Booked in 2 UEFA Euro 2012 qualifying matches
MF	Miloš Krasić	Serbia	2	0	vs Estonia (29 March 2011)	Booked in 2 UEFA Euro 2012 qualifying matches
DF	Slobodan Rajković	Serbia	2	0	vs Faroe Islands (6 September 2011)	Booked in 2 UEFA Euro 2012 qualifying matches
DF	Nemanja Vidić	Serbia	2	0	vs Italy (12 October 2010)	Booked in 2 UEFA Euro 2012 qualifying matches
MF	Milan Jovanović	Serbia	2	0	TBD	Booked in 2 UEFA Euro 2012 qualifying matches
GK	Samir Handanovič	Slovenia	2	0	vs Italy (6 September 2011)	Booked in 2 UEFA Euro 2012 qualifying matches
MF	Robert Koren	Slovenia	2	0	vs Serbia (11 October 2011)	Booked in 2 UEFA Euro 2012 qualifying matches
