= UEFA Euro 2012 qualifying Group I =

Football tournament qualifying stage

This page shows the standings and results for Group I of the UEFA Euro 2012 qualifying tournament.

== Standings ==
Pos	Team	Pld	W	D	L	GF	GA	GD	Pts	Qualification	(Spain)	(Czech Republic)	(Scotland)	(Lithuania)	(Liechtenstein)
1	Spain	8	8	0	0	26	6	+20	24	Qualify for final tournament	—	2–1	3–1	3–1	6–0
2	Czech Republic	8	4	1	3	12	8	+4	13	Advance to play-offs	0–2	—	1–0	0–1	2–0
3	Scotland	8	3	2	3	9	10	−1	11		2–3	2–2	—	1–0	2–1
4	Lithuania	8	1	2	5	4	13	−9	5		1–3	1–4	0–0	—	0–0
5	Liechtenstein	8	1	1	6	3	17	−14	4		0–4	0–2	0–1	2–0	—

Source: UEFA
Rules for classification: Qualification tiebreakers

== Matches ==
Group I fixtures were negotiated between the participants at a meeting in Madrid, Spain, on 19 February 2010.

3 September 2010
21:15 UTC+3

Lithuania	0–0	Scotland
	Report

S. Darius and S. Girėnas Stadium, Kaunas
Attendance: 5,248
Referee: Cüneyt Çakır (Turkey)
3 September 2010
20:45 UTC+2

Liechtenstein	0–4	Spain
	Report	Torres 18', 54'; Villa 26'; Silva 62'

Rheinpark Stadion, Vaduz
Attendance: 6,100
Referee: Bülent Yıldırım (Turkey)

7 September 2010
20:15 UTC+2

Czech Republic	0–1	Lithuania
	Report	Šernas 25'

Andrův stadion, Olomouc
Attendance: 12,038
Referee: Alon Yefet (Israel)
7 September 2010
20:00 UTC+1

Scotland	2–1	Liechtenstein
Miller 62'; McManus 90+7'	Report	Frick 46'

Hampden Park, Glasgow
Attendance: 37,050
Referee: Viktor Shvetsov (Ukraine)

8 October 2010
20:15 UTC+2

Czech Republic	1–0	Scotland
Hubník 69'	Report

Synot Tip Arena, Prague
Attendance: 14,922
Referee: Ivan Bebek (Croatia)
8 October 2010
22:00 UTC+2

Spain	3–1	Lithuania
Llorente 47', 56'; Silva 79'	Report	Šernas 54'

Estadio El Helmántico, Villares de la Reina
Attendance: 16,800
Referee: Gianluca Rocchi (Italy)

12 October 2010
20:00 UTC+2

Liechtenstein	0–2	Czech Republic
	Report	Necid 12'; V. Kadlec 29'

Rheinpark Stadion, Vaduz
Attendance: 2,555
Referee: Stanislav Sukhina (Russia)
12 October 2010
20:00 UTC+1

Scotland	2–3	Spain
Naismith 58'; Piqué 67' (o.g.)	Report	Villa 44' (pen.); Iniesta 55'; Llorente 79'

Hampden Park, Glasgow
Attendance: 51,322
Referee: Massimo Busacca (Switzerland)

25 March 2011
22:00 UTC+1

Spain	2–1	Czech Republic
Villa 69', 73' (pen.)	Report	Plašil 29'

Estadio Nuevo Los Cármenes, Granada
Attendance: 16,301
Referee: Viktor Kassai (Hungary)

29 March 2011
17:30 UTC+2

Czech Republic	2–0	Liechtenstein
Baroš 3'; M. Kadlec 70'	Report

Stadion Střelecký ostrov, České Budějovice
Attendance: 6,600
Referee: Ovidiu Alin Hategan (Romania)
29 March 2011
20:45 UTC+3

Lithuania	1–3	Spain
Stankevičius 57'	Report	Xavi 19'; Kijanskas 70' (o.g.); Mata 83'

S. Darius and S. Girėnas Stadium, Kaunas
Attendance: 9,180
Referee: Laurent Duhamel (France)

3 June 2011
19:30 UTC+2

Liechtenstein	2–0	Lithuania
Erne 7'; Polverino 36'	Report

Rheinpark Stadion, Vaduz
Attendance: 1,886
Referee: Artyom Kuchin (Kazakhstan)

2 September 2011
18:00 UTC+3

Lithuania	0–0	Liechtenstein
	Report

S. Darius and S. Girėnas Stadium, Kaunas
Attendance: 3,500
Referee: Ken Henry Johnsen (Norway)
3 September 2011
15:00 UTC+1

Scotland	2–2	Czech Republic
Miller 44'; Fletcher 82'	Report	Plašil 78'; M. Kadlec 90' (pen.)

Hampden Park, Glasgow
Attendance: 51,564
Referee: Kevin Blom (Netherlands)

6 September 2011
20:00 UTC+1

Scotland	1–0	Lithuania
Naismith 50'	Report

Hampden Park, Glasgow
Attendance: 34,071
Referee: Kristinn Jakobsson (Iceland)
6 September 2011
22:00 UTC+2

Spain	6–0	Liechtenstein
Negredo 34', 37'; Xavi 44'; Ramos 52'; Villa 60', 79'	Report

Estadio Las Gaunas, Logroño
Attendance: 15,660
Referee: Harald Lechner (Austria)

7 October 2011
20:45 UTC+2

Czech Republic	0–2	Spain
	Report	Mata 6'; Alonso 23'

Generali Arena, Prague
Attendance: 17,873
Referee: Paolo Tagliavento (Italy)
8 October 2011
19:30 UTC+2

Liechtenstein	0–1	Scotland
	Report	Mackail-Smith 32'

Rheinpark Stadion, Vaduz
Attendance: 5,636
Referee: Tom Harald Hagen (Norway)

11 October 2011
20:45 UTC+2

Spain	3–1	Scotland
Silva 6', 44'; Villa 54'	Report	Goodwillie 66' (pen.)

Estadio José Rico Pérez, Alicante
Attendance: 27,559
Referee: Stefan Johannesson (Sweden)
11 October 2011
21:45 UTC+3

Lithuania	1–4	Czech Republic
Šernas 68' (pen.)	Report	M. Kadlec 2' (pen.), 85' (pen.); Rezek 16', 45'

S. Darius and S. Girėnas Stadium, Kaunas
Attendance: 4,000
Referee: David Fernández Borbalán (Spain)

== Goalscorers ==
There were 54 goals scored in 20 matches, for an average of 2.7 goals per match.

7 goals

- (Spain national football team) David Villa

4 goals

- (Czech Republic national football team) Michal Kadlec
- (Spain national football team) David Silva

3 goals

- (Lithuania national football team) Darvydas Šernas
- (Spain national football team) Fernando Llorente

2 goals

- (Czech Republic national football team) Jaroslav Plašil
- (Czech Republic national football team) Jan Rezek
- (Scotland national football team) Kenny Miller
- (Scotland national football team) Steven Naismith
- (Spain national football team) Juan Mata
- (Spain national football team) Álvaro Negredo
- (Spain national football team) Fernando Torres
- (Spain national football team) Xavi

1 goal

- (Czech Republic national football team) Milan Baroš
- (Czech Republic national football team) Roman Hubník
- (Czech Republic national football team) Václav Kadlec
- (Czech Republic national football team) Tomáš Necid
- (Liechtenstein national football team) Philippe Erne
- (Liechtenstein national football team) Mario Frick
- (Liechtenstein national football team) Michele Polverino
- (Lithuania national football team) Marius Stankevičius
- (Scotland national football team) Darren Fletcher
- (Scotland national football team) David Goodwillie
- (Scotland national football team) Craig Mackail-Smith
- (Scotland national football team) Stephen McManus
- (Spain national football team) Xabi Alonso
- (Spain national football team) Andrés Iniesta
- (Spain national football team) Sergio Ramos

1 own goal

- (Lithuania national football team) Tadas Kijanskas (against Spain)
- (Spain national football team) Gerard Piqué (against Scotland)

== Discipline ==
Pos	Player	Country	Yellow card	Red card	Suspended for match(es)	Reason
DF	Steven Whittaker	Scotland	3	1	vs Czech Republic (3 September 2011)	Sent off in a UEFA Euro 2012 qualifying match Booked in 2 UEFA Euro 2012 qualifying matches
MF	Tomáš Hübschman	Czech Republic	2	1	vs Lithuania (11 October 2011) vs Montenegro (11 and 15 November 2011)	Sent off in a UEFA Euro 2012 qualifying match
MF	Edgaras Česnauskis	Lithuania	2	1	vs Scotland (6 September 2011)	Sent off in a UEFA Euro 2012 qualifying match
MF	Roman Hubník	Czech Republic	0	1	vs Montenegro (11 November 2011)	Sent off in a UEFA Euro 2012 qualifying match
FW	Thomas Beck	Liechtenstein	3	0	vs Lithuania (2 September 2011)	Booked in 2 UEFA Euro 2012 qualifying matches
FW	Mario Frick	Liechtenstein	3	0	vs Lithuania (3 June 2011)	Booked in 2 UEFA Euro 2012 qualifying matches
MF	Michele Polverino	Liechtenstein	3	0	vs Czech Republic (12 October 2010)	Booked in 2 UEFA Euro 2012 qualifying matches
DF	Martin Stocklasa	Liechtenstein	3	0	vs Czech Republic (12 October 2010)	Booked in 2 UEFA Euro 2012 qualifying matches
MF	Sandro Wieser	Liechtenstein	3	0	vs Czech Republic (12 October 2010)	Booked in 2 UEFA Euro 2012 qualifying matches
MF	Ramūnas Radavičius	Lithuania	3	0	vs Liechtenstein (2 September 2011)	Booked in 2 UEFA Euro 2012 qualifying matches
MF	Jaroslav Plašil	Czech Republic	2	0	vs Spain (7 October 2011)	Booked in 2 UEFA Euro 2012 qualifying matches
MF	Jan Rezek	Czech Republic	2	0	vs Spain (7 October 2011)	Booked in 2 UEFA Euro 2012 qualifying matches
DF	Franz Burgmeier	Liechtenstein	2	0	vs Scotland (8 October 2011)	Booked in 2 UEFA Euro 2012 qualifying matches
DF	Martin Rechsteiner	Liechtenstein	2	0	vs Lithuania (3 June 2011)	Booked in 2 UEFA Euro 2012 qualifying matches
DF	Deividas Šemberas	Lithuania	2	0	vs Czech Republic (11 October 2011)	Booked in 2 UEFA Euro 2012 qualifying matches
MF	Darvydas Šernas	Lithuania	2	0	vs Liechtenstein (2 September 2011)	Booked in 2 UEFA Euro 2012 qualifying matches
DF	Andrius Skerla	Lithuania	2	0	TBD	Booked in 2 UEFA Euro 2012 qualifying matches
MF	Scott Brown	Scotland	2	0	vs Lithuania (6 September 2011)	Booked in 2 UEFA Euro 2012 qualifying matches
MF	Lee McCulloch	Scotland	2	0	vs Czech Republic (8 October 2010)	Booked in 2 UEFA Euro 2012 qualifying matches
FW	Kenny Miller	Scotland	2	0	vs Lithuania (6 September 2011)	Booked in 2 UEFA Euro 2012 qualifying matches
MF	Barry Robson	Scotland	2	0	vs Spain (12 October 2010)	Booked in 2 UEFA Euro 2012 qualifying matches
