= UEFA Euro 2012 qualifying Group A =

Football tournament qualifying stage

This page shows the standings and results for Group A of the UEFA Euro 2012 qualifying tournament.

== Standings ==
Pos	Team	Pld	W	D	L	GF	GA	GD	Pts	Qualification	(Germany)	(Turkey)	(Belgium)	(Austria)	(Azerbaijan)	(Kazakhstan)
1	Germany	10	10	0	0	34	7	+27	30	Qualify for final tournament	—	3–0	3–1	6–2	6–1	4–0
2	Turkey	10	5	2	3	13	11	+2	17	Advance to play-offs	1–3	—	3–2	2–0	1–0	2–1
3	Belgium	10	4	3	3	21	15	+6	15		0–1	1–1	—	4–4	4–1	4–1
4	Austria	10	3	3	4	16	17	−1	12		1–2	0–0	0–2	—	3–0	2–0
5	Azerbaijan	10	2	1	7	10	26	−16	7		1–3	1–0	1–1	1–4	—	3–2
6	Kazakhstan	10	1	1	8	6	24	−18	4		0–3	0–3	0–2	0–0	2–1	—

Source: UEFA
Rules for classification: Qualification tiebreakers

== Matches ==
Group A fixtures were negotiated between the participants at a meeting in Frankfurt, Germany, on 21 and 22 February 2010.

3 September 2010
22:00 UTC+6

Kazakhstan	0–3	Turkey
	Report	Arda Turan 24'; Hamit 26'; Nihat 76'

Astana Arena, Astana
Attendance: 15,800
Referee: István Vad (Hungary)
3 September 2010
20:45 UTC+2

Belgium	0–1	Germany
	Report	Klose 51'

King Baudouin Stadium, Brussels
Attendance: 41,126
Referee: Terje Hauge (Norway)

7 September 2010
21:00 UTC+3

Turkey	3–2	Belgium
Hamit 48'; Semih 66'; Arda 78'	Report	Van Buyten 28', 68'

Şükrü Saracoğlu Stadium, Istanbul
Attendance: 43,538
Referee: Damir Skomina (Slovenia)
7 September 2010
20:30 UTC+2

Austria	2–0	Kazakhstan
Linz 90+1'; Hoffer 90+2'	Report

Red Bull Arena, Salzburg
Attendance: 22,500
Referee: Marijo Strahonja (Croatia)
7 September 2010
20:45 UTC+2

Germany	6–1	Azerbaijan
Westermann 28'; Podolski 45+1'; Klose 45+2', 90+2'; Sadygov 53' (o.g.); Badstuber 86'	Report	Javadov 62'

RheinEnergieStadion, Cologne
Attendance: 43,751
Referee: Markus Strömbergsson (Sweden)

8 October 2010
22:00 UTC+6

Kazakhstan	0–2	Belgium
	Report	Ogunjimi 52', 70'

Astana Arena, Astana
Attendance: 8,500
Referee: Marcin Borski (Poland)
8 October 2010
20:30 UTC+2

Austria	3–0	Azerbaijan
Prödl 3'; Arnautović 53', 90+2'	Report

Ernst Happel Stadion, Vienna
Attendance: 26,500
Referee: Nicolai Vollquartz (Denmark)
8 October 2010
20:45 UTC+2

Germany	3–0	Turkey
Klose 42', 87'; Özil 79'	Report

Olympiastadion, Berlin
Attendance: 74,244
Referee: Howard Webb (England)

12 October 2010
20:00 UTC+5

Azerbaijan	1–0	Turkey
R. F. Sadygov 38'	Report

Tofik Bakhramov Stadium, Baku
Attendance: 29,500
Referee: Alexandru Deaconu (Romania)
12 October 2010
23:00 UTC+6

Kazakhstan	0–3	Germany
	Report	Klose 48'; Gómez 76'; Podolski 85'

Astana Arena, Astana
Attendance: 18,000
Referee: Alexandru Dan Tudor (Romania)
12 October 2010
20:45 UTC+2

Belgium	4–4	Austria
Vossen 11'; Fellaini 47'; Ogunjimi 87'; Lombaerts 89'	Report	Schiemer 14', 62'; Arnautović 29'; Harnik 90+3'

King Baudouin Stadium, Brussels
Attendance: 24,231
Referee: Mike Dean (England)

25 March 2011
20:30 UTC+1

Austria	0–2	Belgium
	Report	Witsel 6', 50'

Ernst Happel Stadion, Vienna
Attendance: 45,000
Referee: Vladislav Bezborodov (Russia)
26 March 2011
20:00 UTC+1

Germany	4–0	Kazakhstan
Klose 3', 88'; Müller 25', 43'	Report

Fritz-Walter-Stadion, Kaiserslautern
Attendance: 47,849
Referee: Aleksandar Stavrev (Macedonia)

29 March 2011
20:30 UTC+3

Turkey	2–0	Austria
Arda 28'; Gökhan G. 78'	Report

Şükrü Saracoğlu Stadium, Istanbul
Attendance: 40,420
Referee: Pavel Kralovec (Czech Republic)
29 March 2011
20:45 UTC+2

Belgium	4–1	Azerbaijan
Vertonghen 12'; Simons 32' (pen.); Chadli 45'; Vossen 74'	Report	Abishov 16'

King Baudouin Stadium, Brussels
Attendance: 34,985
Referee: Daniel Stalhammar (Sweden)

3 June 2011
19:00 UTC+6

Kazakhstan	2–1	Azerbaijan
Gridin 57', 68'	Report	Nadirov 63'

Astana Arena, Astana
Attendance: 10,000
Referee: Euan Norris (Scotland)
3 June 2011
20:35 UTC+2

Austria	1–2	Germany
Friedrich 50' (o.g.)	Report	Gómez 44', 90'

Ernst Happel Stadion, Vienna
Attendance: 47,500
Referee: Massimo Busacca (Switzerland)
3 June 2011
20:45 UTC+2

Belgium	1–1	Turkey
Ogunjimi 4'	Report	Burak 22'

King Baudouin Stadium, Brussels
Attendance: 44,185
Referee: Nicola Rizzoli (Italy)

7 June 2011
22:00 UTC+5

Azerbaijan	1–3	Germany
M. Hüseynov 89'	Report	Özil 30'; Gómez 41'; Schürrle 90+3'

Tofik Bakhramov Stadium, Baku
Attendance: 29,858
Referee: Michael Koukoulakis (Greece)

2 September 2011
21:00 UTC+5

Azerbaijan	1–1	Belgium
R. Aliyev 86'	Report	Simons 55' (pen.)

Tofik Bakhramov Stadium, Baku
Attendance: 9,300
Referee: Lee Probert (England)
2 September 2011
20:00 UTC+3

Turkey	2–1	Kazakhstan
Burak 31'; Arda 90+6'	Report	Konysbayev 55'

Turk Telekom Arena, Istanbul
Attendance: 47,756
Referee: Clément Turpin (France)
2 September 2011
20:45 UTC+2

Germany	6–2	Austria
Klose 8'; Özil 23', 47'; Podolski 28'; Schürrle 83'; Götze 88'	Report	Arnautović 42'; Harnik 51'

Arena AufSchalke, Gelsenkirchen
Attendance: 53,313
Referee: Paolo Tagliavento (Italy)

6 September 2011
20:00 UTC+5

Azerbaijan	3–2	Kazakhstan
R. Aliyev 53'; Shukurov 62' (pen.); Javadov 67'	Report	Ostapenko 20'; Yevstigneyev 77'

Tofik Bakhramov Stadium, Baku
Attendance: 9,112
Referee: Anders Hermansen (Denmark)
6 September 2011
20:30 UTC+2

Austria	0–0	Turkey
	Report

Ernst Happel Stadion, Vienna
Attendance: 47,500
Referee: Alberto Undiano Mallenco (Spain)

7 October 2011
21:00 UTC+5

Azerbaijan	1–4	Austria
Nadirov 74'	Report	Ivanschitz 34'; Janko 52', 62'; Junuzović 90+1'

Dalga Stadium, Baku
Attendance: 6,000
Referee: Stephan Studer (Switzerland)
7 October 2011
21:30 UTC+3

Turkey	1–3	Germany
Hakan 79'	Report	Gómez 35'; Müller 66'; Schweinsteiger 86' (pen.)

Turk Telekom Arena, Istanbul
Attendance: 49,532
Referee: Martin Atkinson (England)
7 October 2011
20:45 UTC+2

Belgium	4–1	Kazakhstan
Simons 40' (pen.); Hazard 43'; Kompany 49'; Ogunjimi 84'	Report	Nurdauletov 86' (pen.)

King Baudouin Stadium, Brussels
Attendance: 29,758
Referee: Milorad Mažić (Serbia)

11 October 2011
22:00 UTC+6

Kazakhstan	0–0	Austria
	Report

Astana Arena, Astana
Attendance: 11,000
Referee: Hannes Kaasik (Estonia)
11 October 2011
19:00 UTC+2

Germany	3–1	Belgium
Özil 30'; Schürrle 33'; Gómez 48'	Report	Fellaini 86'

Esprit Arena, Düsseldorf
Attendance: 48,483
Referee: Svein Oddvar Moen (Norway)
11 October 2011
20:00 UTC+3

Turkey	1–0	Azerbaijan
Burak 60'	Report

Turk Telekom Arena, Istanbul
Attendance: 32,174
Referee: Peter Rasmussen (Denmark)

== Goalscorers ==
There were 100 goals scored in 30 matches, for an average of 3.33 goals per match.

9 goals

- (Germany national football team) Miroslav Klose

6 goals

- (Germany national football team) Mario Gómez

5 goals

- (Belgium national football team) Marvin Ogunjimi
- (Germany national football team) Mesut Özil

4 goals

- (Austria national football team) Marko Arnautović
- (Turkey national football team) Arda Turan

3 goals

- (Belgium national football team) Timmy Simons
- (Germany national football team) Thomas Müller
- (Germany national football team) Lukas Podolski
- (Germany national football team) André Schürrle
- (Turkey national football team) Burak Yılmaz

2 goals

- (Austria national football team) Martin Harnik
- (Austria national football team) Marc Janko
- (Austria national football team) Franz Schiemer
- (Azerbaijan national football team) Rauf Aliyev
- (Azerbaijan national football team) Vagif Javadov
- (Azerbaijan national football team) Vüqar Nadirov
- (Belgium national football team) Marouane Fellaini
- (Belgium national football team) Daniel Van Buyten
- (Belgium national football team) Jelle Vossen
- (Belgium national football team) Axel Witsel
- (Kazakhstan national football team) Sergey Gridin
- (Turkey national football team) Hamit Altıntop

1 goal

- (Austria national football team) Erwin Hoffer
- (Austria national football team) Andreas Ivanschitz
- (Austria national football team) Zlatko Junuzović
- (Austria national football team) Roland Linz
- (Austria national football team) Sebastian Prödl
- (Azerbaijan national football team) Ruslan Abışov
- (Azerbaijan national football team) Murad Hüseynov
- (Azerbaijan national football team) Rashad Sadygov
- (Azerbaijan national football team) Mahir Shukurov
- (Belgium national football team) Nacer Chadli
- (Belgium national football team) Eden Hazard
- (Belgium national football team) Vincent Kompany
- (Belgium national football team) Nicolas Lombaerts
- (Belgium national football team) Jan Vertonghen
- (Germany national football team) Holger Badstuber
- (Germany national football team) Mario Götze
- (Germany national football team) Bastian Schweinsteiger
- (Germany national football team) Heiko Westermann
- (Kazakhstan national football team) Ulan Konysbayev
- (Kazakhstan national football team) Kairat Nurdauletov
- (Kazakhstan national football team) Sergei Ostapenko
- (Kazakhstan national football team) Vitali Yevstigneyev
- (Turkey national football team) Hakan Balta
- (Turkey national football team) Gökhan Gönül
- (Turkey national football team) Nihat Kahveci
- (Turkey national football team) Semih Şentürk

1 own goal

- (Azerbaijan national football team) Rashad Sadygov (against Germany)
- (Germany national football team) Arne Friedrich (against Austria)
