= UEFA Euro 2012 qualifying Group G =

2012 UEFA football qualifiers

This page shows the standings and results for Group G of the UEFA Euro 2012 qualifying tournament.

== Standings ==
Pos	Team	Pld	W	D	L	GF	GA	GD	Pts	Qualification	(England)	(Montenegro)	(Switzerland)	(Wales)	(Bulgaria)
1	England	8	5	3	0	17	5	+12	18	Qualify for final tournament	—	0–0	2–2	1–0	4–0
2	Montenegro	8	3	3	2	7	7	0	12	Advance to play-offs	2–2	—	1–0	1–0	1–1
3	Switzerland	8	3	2	3	12	10	+2	11		1–3	2–0	—	4–1	3–1
4	Wales	8	3	0	5	6	10	−4	9		0–2	2–1	2–0	—	0–1
5	Bulgaria	8	1	2	5	3	13	−10	5		0–3	0–1	0–0	0–1	—

Source: UEFA
Rules for classification: Qualification tiebreakers

== Matches ==
A meeting was held in Zürich, Switzerland, on 15 March to determine the Group G fixture schedule. After that meeting proved inconclusive, the fixture list was determined by a random draw at the XXXIV Ordinary UEFA Congress in Tel Aviv, Israel, on 25 March 2010.

3 September 2010
19:30 UTC+2

Montenegro	1–0	Wales
Vučinić 30'	Report

Podgorica City Stadium, Podgorica
Attendance: 7,442
Referee: Anastassios Kakos (Greece)
3 September 2010
20:00 UTC+1

England	4–0	Bulgaria
Defoe 3', 61', 86'; A. Johnson 83'	Report

Wembley Stadium, London
Attendance: 73,426
Referee: Viktor Kassai (Hungary)

7 September 2010
20:30 UTC+3

Bulgaria	0–1	Montenegro
	Report	Zverotić 35'

Vasil Levski National Stadium, Sofia
Attendance: 9,470
Referee: Vladislav Bezborodov (Russia)
7 September 2010
20:45 UTC+2

Switzerland	1–3	England
Shaqiri 71'	Report	Rooney 10'; A. Johnson 69'; Bent 88'

St. Jakob Park, Basel
Attendance: 37,500
Referee: Nicola Rizzoli (Italy)

8 October 2010
20:30 UTC+2

Montenegro	1–0	Switzerland
Vučinić 67'	Report

Podgorica City Stadium, Podgorica
Attendance: 10,750
Referee: Eduardo Iturralde González (Spain)
8 October 2010
19:30 UTC+1

Wales	0–1	Bulgaria
	Report	I. Popov 48'

Cardiff City Stadium, Cardiff
Attendance: 14,061
Referee: Jonas Eriksson (Sweden)

12 October 2010
20:30 UTC+2

Switzerland	4–1	Wales
Stocker 8', 89'; Streller 21'; Inler 82' (pen.)	Report	Bale 13'

St. Jakob Park, Basel
Attendance: 26,000
Referee: Alain Hamer (Luxembourg)
12 October 2010
20:00 UTC+1

England	0–0	Montenegro
	Report

Wembley Stadium, London
Attendance: 73,451
Referee: Manuel Gräfe (Germany)

26 March 2011
15:00 UTC

Wales	0–2	England
	Report	Lampard 7' (pen.); Bent 15'

Millennium Stadium, Cardiff
Attendance: 68,959
Referee: Olegário Benquerença (Portugal)
26 March 2011
18:45 UTC+2

Bulgaria	0–0	Switzerland
	Report

Vasil Levski National Stadium, Sofia
Attendance: 9,600
Referee: William Collum (Scotland)

4 June 2011
16:45 UTC+1

England	2–2	Switzerland
Lampard 37' (pen.); Young 51'	Report	Barnetta 32', 35'

Wembley Stadium, London
Attendance: 84,459
Referee: Damir Skomina (Slovenia)
4 June 2011
20:30 UTC+2

Montenegro	1–1	Bulgaria
Đalović 53'	Report	I. Popov 66'

Podgorica City Stadium, Podgorica
Attendance: 11,500
Referee: Alon Yefet (Israel)

2 September 2011
21:15 UTC+3

Bulgaria	0–3	England
	Report	Cahill 13'; Rooney 21', 45+1'

Vasil Levski National Stadium, Sofia
Attendance: 27,230
Referee: Frank De Bleeckere (Belgium)
2 September 2011
19:45 UTC+1

Wales	2–1	Montenegro
Morison 28'; Ramsey 50'	Report	Jovetić 71'

Cardiff City Stadium, Cardiff
Attendance: 8,194
Referee: Luca Banti (Italy)

6 September 2011
20:30 UTC+2

Switzerland	3–1	Bulgaria
Shaqiri 45+2', 62', 90'	Report	I. Ivanov 8'

St. Jakob Park, Basel
Attendance: 16,880
Referee: Pavel Kralovec (Czech Republic)
6 September 2011
19:45 UTC+1

England	1–0	Wales
Young 35'	Report

Wembley Stadium, London
Attendance: 77,128
Referee: Robert Schörgenhofer (Austria)

7 October 2011
19:45 UTC+1

Wales	2–0	Switzerland
Ramsey 60' (pen.); Bale 71'	Report

Liberty Stadium, Swansea
Attendance: 12,317
Referee: Björn Kuipers (Netherlands)
7 October 2011
21:00 UTC+2

Montenegro	2–2	England
Zverotić 45'; Delibašić 90+1'	Report	Young 11'; Bent 31'

Podgorica City Stadium, Podgorica
Attendance: 11,340
Referee: Wolfgang Stark (Germany)

11 October 2011
21:05 UTC+3

Bulgaria	0–1	Wales
	Report	Bale 45'

Vasil Levski National Stadium, Sofia
Attendance: 1,672
Referee: Paweł Gil (Poland)
11 October 2011
20:15 UTC+2

Switzerland	2–0	Montenegro
Derdiyok 51'; Lichtsteiner 65'	Report

St. Jakob Park, Basel
Attendance: 19,997
Referee: Olegário Benquerença (Portugal)

== Goalscorers ==
There were 45 goals scored in 20 matches, for an average of 2.25 goals per match.

4 goals

- (Switzerland national football team) Xherdan Shaqiri

3 goals

- (England national football team) Darren Bent
- (England national football team) Jermain Defoe
- (England national football team) Wayne Rooney
- (England national football team) Ashley Young
- (Wales national football team) Gareth Bale

2 goals

- (Bulgaria national football team) Ivelin Popov
- (England national football team) Adam Johnson
- (England national football team) Frank Lampard
- (Montenegro national football team) Mirko Vučinić
- (Montenegro national football team) Elsad Zverotić
- (Switzerland national football team) Tranquillo Barnetta
- (Switzerland national football team) Valentin Stocker
- (Wales national football team) Aaron Ramsey

1 goal

- (Bulgaria national football team) Ivan Ivanov
- (England national football team) Gary Cahill
- (Montenegro national football team) Andrija Delibašić
- (Montenegro national football team) Radomir Đalović
- (Montenegro national football team) Stevan Jovetić
- (Switzerland national football team) Eren Derdiyok
- (Switzerland national football team) Gökhan Inler
- (Switzerland national football team) Stephan Lichtsteiner
- (Switzerland national football team) Marco Streller
- (Wales national football team) Steve Morison

== Discipline ==
Pos	Player	Country	Yellow card	Red card	Suspended for match(es)	Reason
DF	Stephan Lichtsteiner	Switzerland	4	1	vs Montenegro (8 October 2010)	Sent off in a UEFA Euro 2012 qualifying match Booked in 2 UEFA Euro 2012 qualifying matches
MF	Zhivko Milanov	Bulgaria	3	1	vs Wales (7 October 2011)	Sent off in a UEFA Euro 2012 qualifying match
FW	Wayne Rooney	England	2	1	vs Switzerland (4 June 2011); First two UEFA Euro 2012 group matches	Booked in 2 UEFA Euro 2012 qualifying matches Sent off in a UEFA Euro 2012 qualifying match
MF	Milorad Peković	Montenegro	4	0	vs Switzerland (8 October 2010 and 11 October 2011)	Booked in 2 UEFA Euro 2012 qualifying matches
MF	Blagoy Georgiev	Bulgaria	3	0	vs Montenegro (4 June 2011)	Booked in 2 UEFA Euro 2012 qualifying matches
MF	James Milner	England	3	0	vs Montenegro (12 October 2010)	Booked in 2 UEFA Euro 2012 qualifying matches
MF	Simon Vukčević	Montenegro	3	0	vs Bulgaria (4 June 2011)	Booked in 2 UEFA Euro 2012 qualifying matches
MF	Valon Behrami	Switzerland	3	0	vs Bulgaria (6 September 2011)	Booked in 2 UEFA Euro 2012 qualifying matches
DF	Miodrag Džudović	Montenegro	2	0	vs Bulgaria (4 June 2011)	Booked in 2 UEFA Euro 2012 qualifying matches
DF	Savo Pavićević	Montenegro	2	0	vs Wales (2 September 2011)	Booked in 2 UEFA Euro 2012 qualifying matches
DF	Milorad Peković	Montenegro	2	0	vs Switzerland (11 October 2011)	Booked in 2 UEFA Euro 2012 qualifying matches
DF	Johan Djourou	Switzerland	2	0	vs Wales (7 October 2011)	Booked in 2 UEFA Euro 2012 qualifying matches
FW	Craig Bellamy	Wales	2	0	vs England (6 September 2011)	Booked in 2 UEFA Euro 2012 qualifying matches
DF	James Collins	Wales	2	0	vs Montenegro (2 September 2011)	Booked in 2 UEFA Euro 2012 qualifying matches
DF	Sam Ricketts	Wales	2	0	vs Switzerland (12 October 2010)	Booked in 2 UEFA Euro 2012 qualifying matches
MF	David Vaughan	Wales	2	0	vs England (6 September 2011)	Booked in 2 UEFA Euro 2012 qualifying matches
MF	Ashley Williams	Wales	2	0	vs England (6 September 2011)	Booked in 2 UEFA Euro 2012 qualifying matches
