= Christian Mouritsen =

Faroese footballer (born 1988)

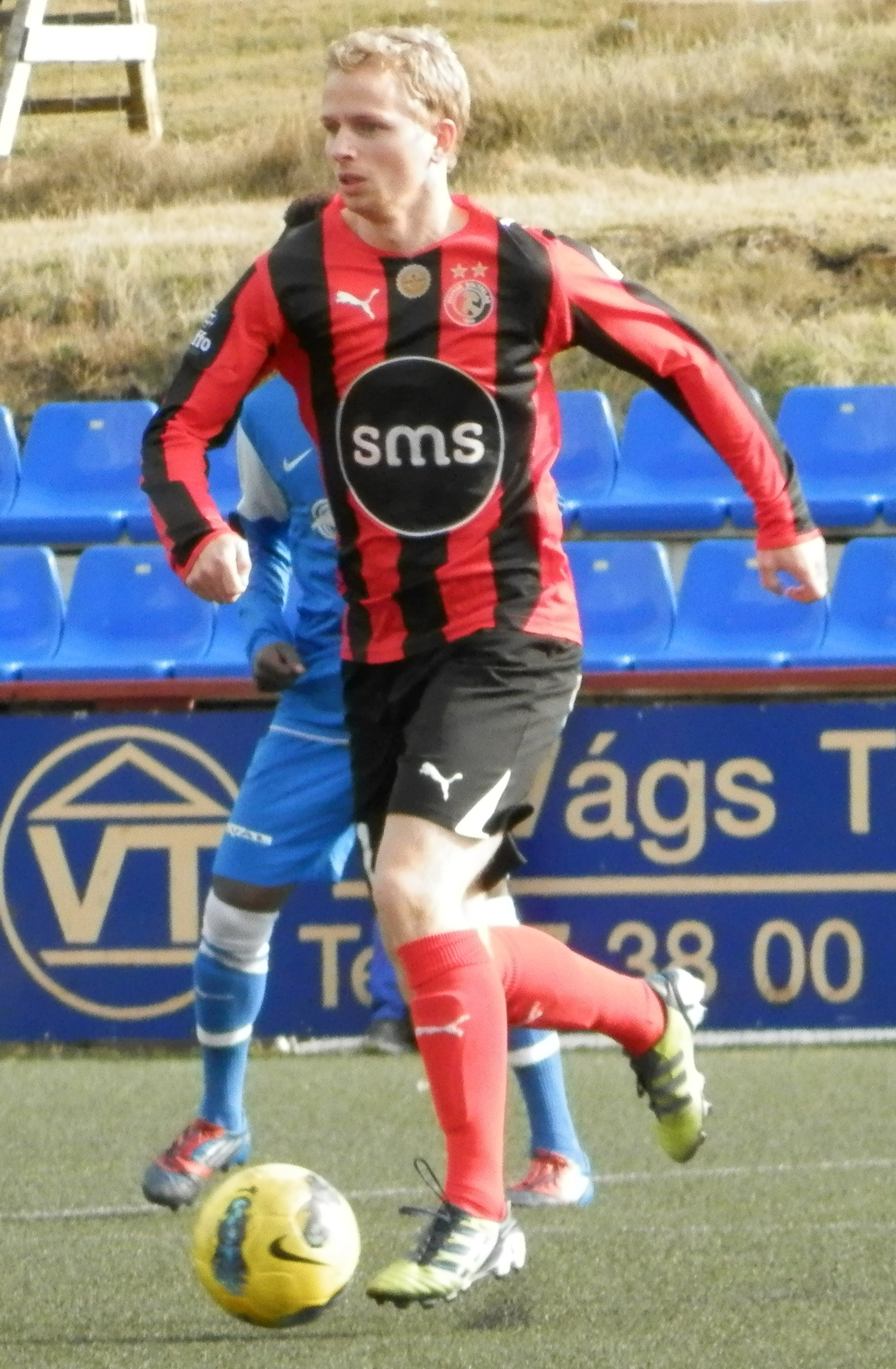

Personal information
- Full name: Christian Restorff Mouritsen
- Date of birth: 3 December 1988 (age 37)
- Place of birth: Tórshavn, Faroe Islands
- Positions: Forward; midfielder

Team information
- Current team: FC Hoyvík

Youth career
- HB Tórshavn
- 2005–2007: Manchester City

Senior career*
| Years | Team | Apps | (Gls) |
| 2007–2008 | Manchester City | 0 | (0) |
| 2008–2009 | HB Tórshavn | 15 | (7) |
| 2009–2010 | B36 Tórshavn | 39 | (10) |
| 2010–2011 | Valur | 11 | (0) |
| 2012–2016 | HB Tórshavn | 109 | (34) |
| 2017–2018 | B36 Tórshavn | 22 | (0) |
| 2019 | 07 Vestur | 22 | (0) |
| 2020– | FC Hoyvík | | |

International career
| 2002–2004 | Faroe Islands U17 | 15 | (2) |
| 2005–2006 | Faroe Islands U19 | 6 | (3) |
| 2007–2009 | Faroe Islands U21 | 11 | (0) |
| 2006–2013 | Faroe Islands | 19 | (1) |
- * Club domestic league appearances and goals as of 11:36, 19 July 2020 (UTC)

Christian Restorff Mouritsen (born 3 December 1988) is a Faroese footballer who plays for 2. deild club FC Hoyvík as a forward or midfielder.

== Club career ==
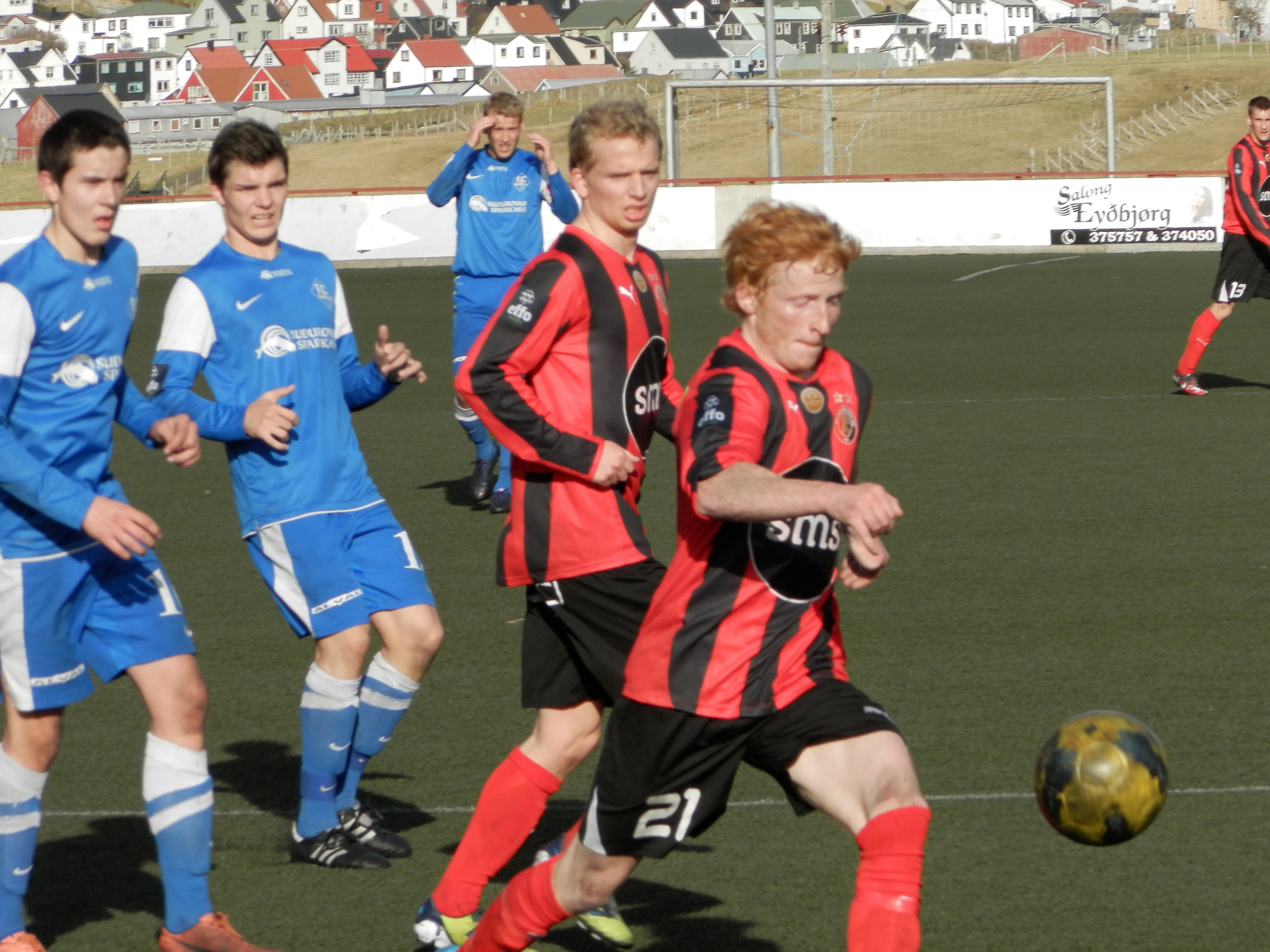
The two brothers Christian R. Mouritsen and Kristin R. Mouritsen (in red/black) playing against FC Suðuroy in 2012.

Mouritsen joined the Manchester City Academy in the 2005 and signed a three-year contract. He had been on trial with Brøndby and Everton, also several other clubs in England and the Netherlands had offered him a trial, but in the end decided to sign with Manchester City. The Youth team reached the FA Youth Cup Final in the 2005–06 season, losing to Liverpool in the final 3–2 on aggregate. After making many appearances for the Manchester City youth and reserve teams, after three years at the club he was released in July 2008 after his contract expired. Shortly after his release prior to Manchester City's match against EB/Streymur, he was quoted as saying "I left City because they told me I wasn't good enough, so I've returned home to try something new".

In August 2008 Mouritsen rejoined HB Tórshavn, he only managed 20 minutes of playing time for HB before the 2008 season ended, because of injuries which kept him sidelined. He also has two brothers who were in the HB Tórshavn squad during the same period, younger brother Kristin and older brother Jóhan.

His first match in 2009 was against B68 Toftir, Mouritsen came on as substitute, deep into the second half. He only went on to make six league appearances from the bench that season for HB, before he transferred to rival club B36 Tórshavn in the summer of 2009.

Although his transfer from HB to B36 did not go as smoothly as planned. Certain formalities were not carried out before 28 July, when the transfer window had closed. HB pointed out to B36 that Mouritsen had been playing for them illegally, after which the appropriate documents were handed to FSF by B36. Later, it was revealed that the reason for the delay was an administrative mistake by B36. The Faroese Football Federation discussed the matter and decided that the transfer could not be accepted because the documents necessary had not been handed in on time. Though they reconsidered and on 21 August they gave Mouritsen permission to transfer to B36. Despite this, the second half of the 2009 season went a lot better for Mouritsen, scoring 2 goals in 9 starts for B36.

After the season had ended, before Christmas in 2009 he went on a trial at Newcastle United along with fellow U-21 teammate Jóan Símun Edmundsson. Jóan ended up going out on-loan to Newcastle United in 2010 until the end of the English season, but Brian Kerr said about Mouritsen "Chris liked them both, but felt that Christian, at 21, needed first-team football, which Newcastle couldn’t offer him." In July 2010, Christian went on trial with English League One club Tranmere Rovers. Christian signed for Valur in November 2010 along with two teammates from the Faroese national team, Jónas Þór Næs and Pól Jóhannus Justinussen.

== International career ==
Mouritsen has represented the Faroe Islands at Under-17, U19 and U21 level, as well at full international level. He was the Faroe Islands U-21 captain and was also part of the U-21 team that famously beat Russia 1–0 in the UEFA U-21 Championship qualifying match. He was picked in the main squad to face Poland in May 2006, but didn't get to make his appearance in the match. His first full cap came three years later when Faroe Islands took on Iceland in a friendly, in 2009. Faroe Islands won the match 2–1.

== Career statistics ==
Scores and results list Faroe Islands' goal tally first.

| # | Date | Venue | Opponent | Score | Result | Competition |
|---|---|---|---|---|---|---|
| 1 | 8 October 2010 | Športni park Stožice, Ljubljana, Slovenia | Slovenia | 1-5 | 1-5 | Euro 2012 qualifying |
