= David Targamadze =

Georgian footballer

- Targamadze in 2011

Personal information
- Date of birth: 22 August 1989 (age 37)
- Place of birth: Tbilisi, Georgian SSR
- Height: 1.68 m (5 ft 6 in)
- Position: Winger

Youth career
- 1998–2006: Dinamo Tbilisi
- 2006–2008: SC Freiburg

Senior career*
Years	Team	Apps	(Gls)
2008–2010	SC Freiburg	8	(0)
2010–2012	PFC Oleksandria	35	(12)
2012–2016	Shakhtar Donetsk	0	(0)
2012–2014	→ Illichivets Mariupol (loan)	51	(5)
2015–2016	→ PFC Oleksandria (loan)	10	(0)
2018	Saburtalo Tbilisi	7	(1)
2019	Sioni Bolnisi	26	(1)
2020	Shevardeni	1	(1)
2020	Samtredia	7	(1)

International career
2007–2008	Georgia U19	6	(1)
2009	Georgia U21	2	(0)
2011–2014	Georgia	20	(2)
- * Club domestic league appearances and goals as of 09:07, 28 November 2020 (UTC)

David Targamadze (Georgian: დავით თარგამაძე; born 22 August 1989) is a Georgian retired professional footballer who played as a winger. He represented the Georgia national team between 2011 and 2014.

== Career ==
Born in Tbilisi, Targamadze played youth football in Georgia with FC Dinamo Tbilisi before moving to German side SC Freiburg in 2006. Targamadze made his senior debut for Freiburg on 28 September 2008, in a match against Alemannia Aachen. He made a total of six league appearances for Freiburg that season, helping them win promotion to the Bundesliga. Targamadze made a further two first team appearances for Freiburg the following season, before signing for Ukrainian club PFC Oleksandria in the summer of 2010. He played 18 league games and scored eight goals during 2010–11, helping Oleksandria win the Ukrainian First League and gain promotion to the top division.

On 30 December 2011, Shakhtar Donetsk officially announced Targamadze's capture on its official website. He signed on loan for PFC Oleksandria in August 2015.

In July 2018, after missing two years due to knee injuries, he returned to Georgia and signed for FC Saburtalo Tbilisi. He left the club at the end of 2018.

== Career statistics ==
As of 7 October 2015

Scores and results list Georgia's goal tally first, score column indicates score after each Targamadze goal.

List of international goals scored by David Targamadze
No.	Date	Venue	Opponent	Score	Result	Competition
1	10 October 2011	Mikheil Meskhi Stadium, Tbilisi, Georgia	Greece	1–1	Draw	UEFA Euro 2012 qualifying
2	24 May 2012	Red Bull Arena, Salzburg, Austria	Turkey	1–3	Loss	Friendly

== Honours ==
SC Freiburg:

- 2. Bundesliga: 2008–09

PFC Oleksandria:

- Ukrainian First League: 2010–11
