= Andrei Sidorenkov =

Estonian footballer (born 1984)

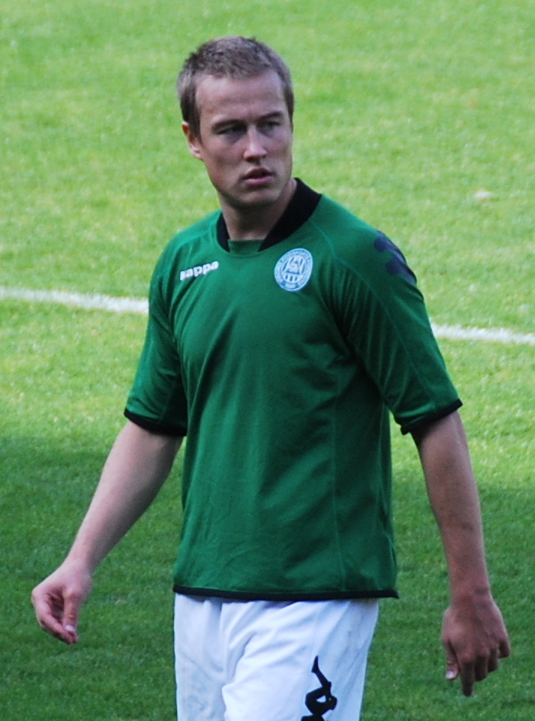
- Sidorenkov with Viborg in 2011

Personal information
- Full name: Andrei Sidorenkov
- Date of birth: 12 February 1984 (age 42)
- Place of birth: Sillamäe, then part of Estonian SSR, Soviet Union
- Height: 1.80 m (5 ft 11 in)
- Positions: Left-back; winger

Senior career*
Years	Team	Apps	(Gls)
2001	Narva Trans	1	(0)
2001	Sillamäe Kalev	27	(6)
2002–2003	Flora	15	(0)
2003	Tulevik	14	(1)
2004	Tervis Pärnu	3	(0)
2004–2008	Flora	112	(10)
2008–2011	SønderjyskE	54	(1)
2011	Viborg	8	(0)
2012	Fredericia	17	(1)
2013	Gomel	25	(0)
2014–2015	Sillamäe Kalev	55	(8)
2016–2017	Nõmme Kalju	57	(10)
2018	Nybergsund	2	(0)
2019–2020	Legion Tallinn	53	(2)

International career^{‡}
2004–2013	Estonia	23	(0)
- * Club domestic league appearances and goals as of 31 December 2020 ‡ National team caps and goals as of 18 November 2016

Andrei Sidorenkov (born 12 February 1984) is an Estonian former professional footballer who played as a left-back.

== Club career ==
Sidorenkov began his career in Estonia and played for Narva Trans, Sillamäe Kalev, Tulevik, Tervis Pärnu and Flora.

He joined Danish Superliga side SønderjyskE on 31 August 2008 and left the club when his three-year contract ran out after the 2010–11 season. He then had a trial at Polish Ekstraklasa club Widzew Łódź, but did not get a contract offer there. In September of the same year Sidorenkov signed a three-month contract with Danish side Viborg, saying the club had potential to pursue promotion. He rejected an extension offer and left the club in late December. In February of the next year he took part in Dinamo București's training camp in Turkey, but left the club without a contract. Later that month he returned to Denmark and signed a 1,5-year contract with Fredericia on 27 February.

== International career ==
Sidorenkov is a member of the Estonian national team with 23 appearances and no goals for the country. He scored an own goal against Slovenia in a UEFA Euro 2012 qualification match on 12 October 2010, giving Slovenia a 1–0 win as it remained the only goal of the match.

== Honours ==
=== Club ===
Flora

- Meistriliiga: 2002
- Estonian Cup: 2007–08
- Estonian Supercup: 2002

Individual

- Meistriliiga Player of the Month: April 2016
