= UEFA Euro 2012 qualifying play-offs =

Football tournament qualifying stage

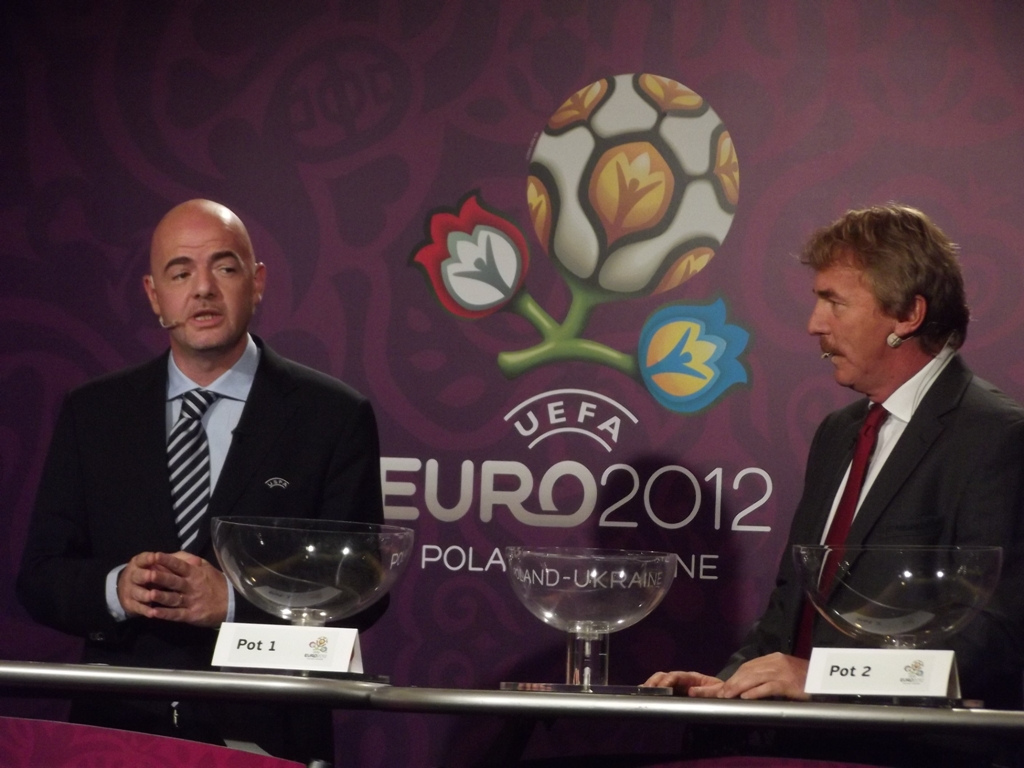
Gianni Infantino (left) and Zbigniew Boniek during a draw for the play-offs

The UEFA Euro 2012 qualifying play-off ties were played over two legs, with the first legs on 11 November and the second legs on 15 November 2011. The four winners are found according to the standard rules for the knockout phase in European competitions, and the winners qualified for the Euro 2012 tournament. Qualifying play-offs was a second stage (round) of UEFA Euro 2012 qualifying.

== Ranking of second-placed teams ==
The highest ranked second placed team from the groups qualified automatically for the tournament, while the remainder entered the playoffs. As six groups contained six teams and three with five, matches against the sixth-placed team in each group were discarded in this ranking. As a result, a total of eight matches played by each team count toward the purpose of the second-placed ranking table.

Pos	Grp	Team	Pld	W	D	L	GF	GA	GD	Pts	Qualification
1	E	Sweden	8	6	0	2	20	11	+9	18	Qualify for final tournament
2	H	Portugal	8	5	1	2	21	12	+9	16	Advance to play-offs
3	F	Croatia	8	5	1	2	12	6	+6	16	Advance to play-offs
4	B	Republic of Ireland	8	4	3	1	10	6	+4	15	Advance to play-offs
5	D	Bosnia and Herzegovina	8	4	2	2	9	8	+1	14	Advance to play-offs
6	I	Czech Republic	8	4	1	3	12	8	+4	13	Advance to play-offs
7	C	Estonia	8	4	1	3	13	11	+2	13	Advance to play-offs
8	G	Montenegro	8	3	3	2	7	7	0	12	Advance to play-offs
9	A	Turkey	8	3	2	3	8	10	−2	11	Advance to play-offs

Source: UEFA
Rules for classification: Counting only matches against teams ranked first to fifth in the group, 1) Points; 2) Goal difference; 3) Goals scored; 4) Away goals scored; 5) UEFA national team coefficient ranking; 6) Lower disciplinary points total; 7) Drawing of lots.

== Seedings ==
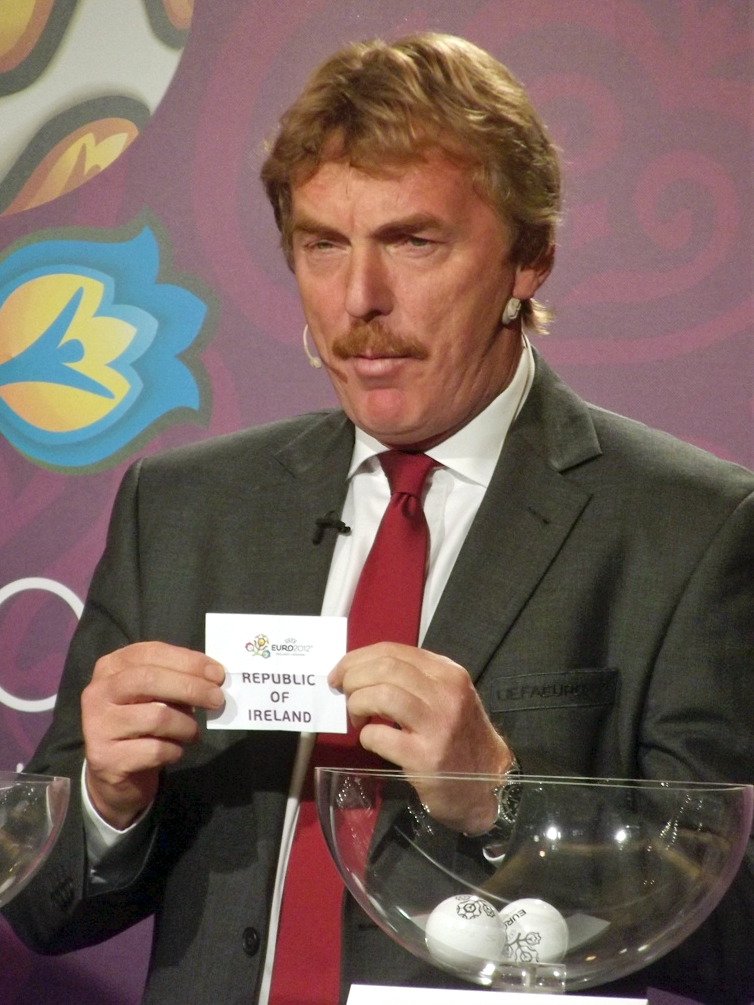
Zbigniew Boniek during the draw

The draw for the play-offs was held on 13 October 2011 in Kraków, Poland, to determine the four pairings as well as the order of the home and away ties.

After the controversy caused by the UEFA play-offs during 2010 FIFA World Cup qualifying – which was originally to be an unseeded draw, but was later altered by FIFA to a seeded one – UEFA stated from the outset that the draw for the play-offs would be seeded. The four runners-up with the best positions in the UEFA team coefficient ranking system were therefore seeded.

Each nation's coefficient was generated by calculating:

- 40% of the average ranking points per game earned in the UEFA Euro 2012 qualifying group stage.
- 40% of the average ranking points per game earned in the 2010 FIFA World Cup qualifying stage and final tournament.
- 20% of the average ranking points per game earned in the UEFA Euro 2008 qualifying stage and final tournament.

The seedings were as follows:

Pot 1 (seeded)
Team	Coeff	Rank
Croatia	32.723	7
Portugal	31.202	11
Republic of Ireland	28.203	13
Czech Republic	27.982	15

Pot 2 (unseeded)
Team	Coeff	Rank
Turkey	27.601	18
Bosnia and Herzegovina	27.199	19
Montenegro	21.876	35
Estonia	20.355	37

== Summary ==
Team 1	Agg.	Team 2	1st leg	2nd leg
Turkey	0–3	Croatia	0–3	0–0
Estonia	1–5	Republic of Ireland	0–4	1–1
Czech Republic	3–0	Montenegro	2–0	1–0
Bosnia and Herzegovina	2–6	Portugal	0–0	2–6

== Matches ==
11 November 2011
21:05 UTC+2

Turkey	0–3	Croatia
	Report	Olić 2'; Mandžukić 32'; Ćorluka 51'

Türk Telekom Arena, Istanbul
Attendance: 42,863
Referee: Felix Brych (Germany)
15 November 2011
20:05 UTC+1

Croatia	0–0	Turkey
	Report

Maksimir Stadium, Zagreb
Attendance: 26,371
Referee: Pedro Proença (Portugal)

Croatia won 3–0 on aggregate and qualified for UEFA Euro 2012.

11 November 2011
21:45 UTC+2

Estonia	0–4	Republic of Ireland
	Report	Andrews 13'; Walters 67'; Keane 71', 88' (pen.)

A. Le Coq Arena, Tallinn
Attendance: 9,692
Referee: Viktor Kassai (Hungary)
15 November 2011
19:45 UTC±0

Republic of Ireland	1–1	Estonia
Ward 32'	Report	Vassiljev 57'

Aviva Stadium, Dublin
Attendance: 51,151
Referee: Björn Kuipers (Netherlands)

Republic of Ireland won 5–1 on aggregate and qualified for UEFA Euro 2012.

11 November 2011
20:15 UTC+1

Czech Republic	2–0	Montenegro
Pilař 63'; Sivok 90+2'	Report

Generali Arena, Prague
Attendance: 14,560
Referee: Martin Atkinson (England)
15 November 2011
20:15 UTC+1

Montenegro	0–1	Czech Republic
	Report	Jiráček 81'

Podgorica City Stadium, Podgorica
Attendance: 10,100
Referee: Nicola Rizzoli (Italy)

Czech Republic won 3–0 on aggregate and qualified for UEFA Euro 2012.

11 November 2011
20:00 UTC+1

Bosnia and Herzegovina	0–0	Portugal
	Report

Bilino Polje, Zenica
Attendance: 12,352
Referee: Howard Webb (England)
15 November 2011
21:00 UTC±0

Portugal	6–2	Bosnia and Herzegovina
Ronaldo 8', 53'; Nani 24'; Postiga 72', 82'; Veloso 80'	Report	Misimović 41' (pen.); Spahić 65'

Estádio da Luz, Lisbon
Attendance: 47,728
Referee: Wolfgang Stark (Germany)

Portugal won 6–2 on aggregate and qualified for UEFA Euro 2012.

== Goalscorers ==
There were 20 goals scored in 8 matches, for an average of 2.5 goals per match.

2 goals

- (Portugal national football team) Hélder Postiga
- (Portugal national football team) Cristiano Ronaldo
- (Republic of Ireland national football team) Robbie Keane

1 goal

- (Bosnia and Herzegovina national football team) Zvjezdan Misimović
- (Bosnia and Herzegovina national football team) Emir Spahić
- (Croatia national football team) Vedran Ćorluka
- (Croatia national football team) Mario Mandžukić
- (Croatia national football team) Ivica Olić
- (Czech Republic national football team) Petr Jiráček
- (Czech Republic national football team) Václav Pilař
- (Czech Republic national football team) Tomáš Sivok
- (Estonia national football team) Konstantin Vassiljev
- (Portugal national football team) Nani
- (Portugal national football team) Miguel Veloso
- (Republic of Ireland national football team) Keith Andrews
- (Republic of Ireland national football team) Jonathan Walters
- (Republic of Ireland national football team) Stephen Ward
