= Philippe Erne =

Liechtenstein footballer

Personal information
- Date of birth: 14 December 1986 (age 39)
- Place of birth: Vaduz, Liechtenstein
- Positions: Striker; right winger

Senior career*
Years	Team	Apps	(Gls)
2005–2006	FC Vaduz		
2006–2007	FC Chur 97	19	(2)
2007–2011	USV Eschen/Mauren	60	(14)
2011–2013	FC Vaduz	17	(1)
2013–2014	FC Balzers	18	(5)
2014	SC Pfullendorf	11	(1)
2014–2021	FC Balzers	77	(14)
2021–2024	FC Ruggell		

International career^{‡}
2009–2018	Liechtenstein	35	(1)
- * Club domestic league appearances and goals as of 31 May 2025 ‡ National team caps and goals as of 18 November 2018

Philippe Erne (born 14 December 1986) is a retired Liechtensteiner international footballer who played as a striker for SC Pfullendorf, FC Vaduz, USV Eschen/Mauren, FC Chur 97, FC Balzers and FC Ruggell.

== International career ==
=== International goals ===
Scores and results list Liechtenstein's goal tally first.

Goal	Date	Venue	Opponent	Score	Result	Competition
1.	3 June 2011	Rheinpark Stadion, Vaduz, Liechtenstein	Lithuania	1–0	2–0	UEFA Euro 2012 qualifying
