= David Siradze =

Georgian footballer

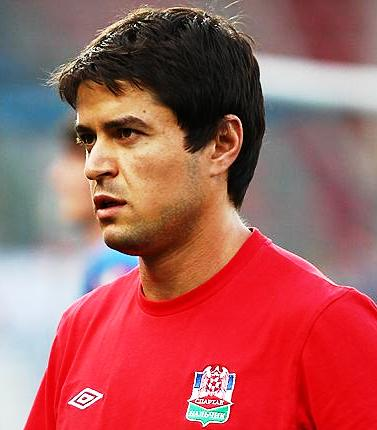
- Siradze with PFC Spartak Nalchik in 2010

Personal information
- Date of birth: 21 October 1981 (age 45)
- Place of birth: Tbilisi, Soviet Union
- Height: 1.80 m (5 ft 11 in)
- Position: Striker

Youth career
- 1996–1998: Dinamo Tbilisi
- 1999–2001: Erzurumspor

Senior career*
Years	Team	Apps	(Gls)
2001–2003	Lokomotivi Tbilisi	60	(18)
2003–2004	Union Berlin	12	(1)
2004–2005	Eintracht Trier	19	(1)
2005	Lokomotivi Tbilisi	13	(4)
2006–2007	Erzgebirge Aue	32	(6)
2007–2008	SC Paderborn	9	(0)
2008	→ PFC Spartak Nalchik (loan)	27	(4)
2009–2014	PFC Spartak Nalchik	124	(15)
2014	Sioni Bolnisi	12	(3)
2015	Dacia Chișinău	9	(2)
Total		317	(54)

International career
2000–2002	Georgia U-17	10	(4)
2004	Georgia U-21	2	(1)
2004–2011	Georgia	28	(8)
- * Club domestic league appearances and goals

David Siradze (Georgian: დავით სირაძე; born 21 October 1981) is a Georgian former professional footballer who played as a striker.

== Club career ==
Siradze was born, in Tbilisi, Soviet Union.

In February 2008 he left SC Paderborn 07 and moved on loan to PFC Spartak Nalchik in March 2008. He was released by Paderborn in January 2009.

== International career ==
Siradze was Georgia U-21 national team member. Between 2004 and 2011 he was the member of the senior national team and scored 8 goals in 28 caps. He remains one of the top scorers of Georgian national football team.
