= UEFA Euro 2012 statistics =

International football tournament statistics

These are the statistics for the UEFA Euro 2012, which took place in Poland and Ukraine.

== Goalscorers ==
There were 76 goals scored in 31 matches, for an average of 2.45 goals per match.

3 goals

- (Croatia) Mario Mandžukić
- (Germany) Mario Gómez
- (Italy) Mario Balotelli
- (Portugal) Cristiano Ronaldo
- (Russia) Alan Dzagoev
- (Spain) Fernando Torres

2 goals

- (Czech Republic) Petr Jiráček
- (Czech Republic) Václav Pilař
- (Denmark) Nicklas Bendtner
- (Denmark) Michael Krohn-Dehli
- (Greece) Dimitris Salpingidis
- (Spain) Xabi Alonso
- (Spain) Cesc Fàbregas
- (Spain) David Silva
- (Sweden) Zlatan Ibrahimović
- (Ukraine) Andriy Shevchenko

1 goal

- (Croatia) Nikica Jelavić
- (England) Andy Carroll
- (England) Joleon Lescott
- (England) Wayne Rooney
- (England) Theo Walcott
- (England) Danny Welbeck
- (France) Yohan Cabaye
- (France) Jérémy Ménez
- (France) Samir Nasri
- (Germany) Lars Bender
- (Germany) Sami Khedira
- (Germany) Miroslav Klose
- (Germany) Philipp Lahm
- (Germany) Mesut Özil
- (Germany) Lukas Podolski
- (Germany) Marco Reus
- (Greece) Theofanis Gekas
- (Greece) Giorgos Karagounis
- (Greece) Georgios Samaras
- (Italy) Antonio Cassano
- (Italy) Antonio Di Natale
- (Italy) Andrea Pirlo
- (Netherlands) Rafael van der Vaart
- (Netherlands) Robin van Persie
- (Poland) Jakub Błaszczykowski
- (Poland) Robert Lewandowski
- (Portugal) Pepe
- (Portugal) Hélder Postiga
- (Portugal) Silvestre Varela
- (Republic of Ireland) Sean St Ledger
- (Russia) Roman Pavlyuchenko
- (Russia) Roman Shirokov
- (Spain) Jordi Alba
- (Spain) Juan Mata
- (Spain) Jesús Navas
- (Sweden) Sebastian Larsson
- (Sweden) Olof Mellberg

1 own goal

- (England) Glen Johnson (against Sweden)

Source: UEFA

== Assists ==
There were 60 assists made in Euro 2012. Four players assisted three goals, seven assisted two goals and 36 assisted one goal.

3 assists

- (England) Steven Gerrard
- (Germany) Mesut Özil
- (Russia) Andrey Arshavin
- (Spain) David Silva

2 assists

- (France) Karim Benzema
- (Germany) Bastian Schweinsteiger
- (Italy) Andrea Pirlo
- (Portugal) João Moutinho
- (Portugal) Nani
- (Spain) Xavi
- (Sweden) Sebastian Larsson

1 assist

- (Croatia) Ivan Perišić
- (Croatia) Darijo Srna
- (Croatia) Ivan Strinić
- (Czech Republic) Milan Baroš
- (Czech Republic) Theodor Gebre Selassie
- (Czech Republic) Tomáš Hübschman
- (Czech Republic) Jaroslav Plašil
- (Denmark) Nicklas Bendtner
- (Denmark) Lars Jacobsen
- (Denmark) Michael Krohn-Dehli
- (England) Theo Walcott
- (France) Franck Ribéry
- (Germany) Jérôme Boateng
- (Germany) Mario Gómez
- (Germany) Sami Khedira
- (Germany) Miroslav Klose
- (Greece) Dimitris Salpingidis
- (Greece) Vasilis Torosidis
- (Republic of Ireland) Aiden McGeady
- (Italy) Antonio Cassano
- (Italy) Alessandro Diamanti
- (Italy) Riccardo Montolivo
- (Netherlands) Arjen Robben
- (Netherlands) Wesley Sneijder
- (Poland) Jakub Błaszczykowski
- (Poland) Ludovic Obraniak
- (Portugal) Fábio Coentrão
- (Portugal) João Pereira
- (Russia) Aleksandr Kerzhakov
- (Russia) Roman Pavlyuchenko
- (Spain) Jordi Alba
- (Spain) Andrés Iniesta
- (Spain) Fernando Torres
- (Spain) Cesc Fàbregas
- (Sweden) Samuel Holmén
- (Sweden) Kim Källström
- (Sweden) Olof Mellberg
- (Ukraine) Yevhen Konoplyanka
- (Ukraine) Andriy Yarmolenko

== Scoring ==
- Total number of goals scored: 76
- Average goals per match: 2.45
- Total number of braces: 1 – Xabi Alonso, Mario Balotelli, Nicklas Bendtner, Alan Dzagoev, Mario Gómez, Mario Mandžukić, Cristiano Ronaldo, Andriy Shevchenko, Fernando Torres
- Total number of penalty kicks awarded: 4
- Total number of penalty kicks scored: 3 – Dimitris Salpingidis for Greece against Germany, Xabi Alonso for Spain against France, Mesut Özil for Germany against Italy
- Total number of penalty kicks missed or saved: 1 – Giorgos Karagounis for Greece saved by Przemysław Tytoń of Poland
- Penalty kick success rate: 75%
- Most goals scored by a team: 12 – Spain
- Most goals scored by an individual: 3 – Mario Balotelli, Alan Dzagoev, Mario Gómez, Mario Mandžukić, Cristiano Ronaldo, Fernando Torres (Note: Indicates Golden Boot award (the tie was broken first by highest number of assists and then by fewest minutes played).)
- Most assists provided by an individual: 3 – Andrey Arshavin, Steven Gerrard, Mesut Özil, David Silva
- Most goals and assists produced by an individual: 2 goals and 3 assists – David Silva
- Fewest goals scored by a team: 1 – Republic of Ireland
- Most goals conceded by a team: 9 – Republic of Ireland
- Fewest goals conceded by a team: 1 – Spain
- Best goal difference: +11 – Spain
- Worst goal difference: –8 – Republic of Ireland
- Most goals scored in a match by both teams: 6 – Germany (4–2) Greece
- Most goals scored in a match by one team: 4 – Russia against Czech Republic, Spain against Republic of Ireland, Germany against Greece, Spain against Italy
- Most goals scored in a match by the losing team: 2 – Denmark against Portugal, Sweden against England, Greece against Germany
- Biggest margin of victory: 4 goals – Spain against Republic of Ireland, Spain against Italy
- Most clean sheets achieved by a team: 5 – Spain
- Most clean sheets achieved by a goalkeeper: 5 – Iker Casillas
- Fewest clean sheets achieved by a team: 0 – Croatia, Netherlands, Poland, Republic of Ireland, Russia, Ukraine
- Fewest clean sheets achieved by a goalkeeper: 0 – Kostas Chalkias, Shay Given, Vyacheslav Malafeev, Stipe Pletikosa, Andriy Pyatov, Maarten Stekelenburg, Wojciech Szczęsny
- Most clean sheets given by an opposing team: 2 – France, Republic of Ireland, Italy, Portugal, Ukraine
- Fewest clean sheets given by an opposing team: 0 – Denmark, Germany, Greece, Sweden
- Most consecutive clean sheets achieved by a team: 5 – Spain
- Most consecutive clean sheets achieved by a goalkeeper: 5 – Iker Casillas
- Most consecutive clean sheets given by an opposing team: 2 – France, Republic of Ireland, Ukraine
- First goal of the tournament: Robert Lewandowski for Poland against Greece
- First brace of the tournament: Alan Dzagoev for Russia against Czech Republic
- Last goal of the tournament: Juan Mata for Spain against Italy
- Last brace of the tournament: Mario Balotelli for Italy against Germany
- Fastest goal in a match from kickoff: 3rd minute (2:14) – Petr Jiráček for Czech Republic against Greece
- Fastest goal in a match after coming on as a substitute: 88th minute (1 minute and 14 seconds) – Juan Mata for Spain against Italy
- Latest goal in a match without extra time: 90+2nd minute (91:35) – Mesut Özil for Germany against Italy
- Latest winning goal in a match without extra time: 88th minute – Jesús Navas for Spain against Croatia
- Most goals scored by one player in a match: 2 – Alan Dzagoev for Russia against Czech Republic, Mario Mandžukić for Croatia against Republic of Ireland, Andriy Shevchenko for Ukraine against Sweden, Nicklas Bendtner for Denmark against Portugal, Mario Gómez for Germany against Netherlands, Fernando Torres for Spain against Republic of Ireland, Cristiano Ronaldo for Portugal against Netherlands, Xabi Alonso for Spain against France, Mario Balotelli for Italy against Germany
- Own goals scored: 1 – Glen Johnson (England)
- Oldest goal scorer: 35 years and 257 days – Andriy Shevchenko for Ukraine against Sweden
- Youngest goal scorer: 21 years and 203 days – Danny Welbeck for England against Sweden

Sources: Opta Sports, UEFA

== Attendance ==
- Overall attendance: 1,440,896
- Average attendance per match: 46,481
- Highest attendance: 64,640 – Sweden (2–3) England
- Lowest attendance: 31,840 – Denmark (2–3) Portugal

== Wins and losses ==
- Most wins: 4 – Germany, Spain
- Fewest wins: 0 – Netherlands, Poland, Republic of Ireland
- Most losses: 3 – Netherlands, Republic of Ireland
- Fewest losses: 0 – England, Spain
- Most draws: 3 – Italy
- Fewest draws: 0 – Czech Republic
- Most points in the group stage: 9 – Germany
- Fewest points in the group stage: 0 – Netherlands, Republic of Ireland

== Discipline ==
Sanctions against foul play at Euro 2012 were in the first instance the responsibility of the referee, but when if he deemed it necessary to give a caution, or dismiss a player, UEFA kept a record and may have enforced a suspension. UEFA's disciplinary committee had the ability to penalize players for offenses unpunished by the referee.

=== Overview ===
==== Red cards ====
A player receiving a red card was automatically suspended for the next match. A longer suspension was possible if the UEFA disciplinary committee had judged the offence as warranting it. In keeping with the FIFA Disciplinary Code (FDC) and UEFA Disciplinary Regulations (UDR), UEFA did not allow for appeals of red cards except in the case of mistaken identity. The FDC further stipulated that if a player was sent off during his team's final Euro 2012 match, the suspension would carry over to his team's next competitive international(s), which in this case would be the qualification matches for the 2014 FIFA World Cup.

Any player who was suspended due to a red card that was earned in Euro 2012 qualifying was required to serve the balance of any suspension unserved by the end of qualifying either in the Euro 2012 finals (for any player on a team that qualified, whether he was selected to the final squad or not) or in World Cup qualifying (for players on teams that did not qualify).

==== Yellow cards ====
Any player receiving a single yellow card during two of the three group stage matches and the quarter-final match was suspended for the following match. A single yellow card did not carry over to the semi-finals. This meant that no player could have been suspended for final unless he was sent off in semi-final or he was serving a longer suspension for an earlier incident. Suspensions due to yellow cards did carry over to the World Cup qualifiers. Yellow cards and any related suspensions earned in the Euro 2012 qualifiers were neither counted nor enforced in the final tournament.

In the event a player was sent off for two bookable offenses, only the red card was counted for disciplinary purposes. However, in the event a player received a direct red card after being booked in the same match, then both cards would have been counted. If the player was already facing a suspension for two tournament bookings when he was sent off, this would have resulted in separate suspensions that would have been served consecutively. The one match ban for the yellow cards would be served first unless the player's team was eliminated in the match in which he was sent off. If the player's team was eliminated in the match in which he was serving his ban for the yellow cards, then the ban for the sending off would have been carried over to the World Cup qualifiers.

==== Additional punishment ====
For serious transgressions, a longer suspension may have been handed down at the discretion of the UEFA disciplinary committee. The disciplinary committee was also charged with reviewing any incidents that were missed by the officials and could have awarded administrative red cards and suspensions accordingly. However, just as appeals of red cards were not considered, the disciplinary committee was also not allowed to review transgressions that were already punished by the referee with something less than a red card. For example, if a player was booked but not sent off for a dangerous tackle, the disciplinary committee could not subsequently deem the challenge to be violent conduct and then upgrade the card to a red. However, if the same player then spat at the opponent but was still not sent off, then the referee's report would have been unlikely to mention this automatic red card offense. Video evidence of the spitting incident could then be independently reviewed.

Unlike the rules in many domestic competitions, there is no particular category of red card offense that automatically results in a multi-game suspension. In general however, extended bans were only assessed for red cards given for serious foul play, violent conduct, spitting or perhaps foul and abusive language. Also, unlike many sets of domestic rules second and subsequent red cards also did not automatically incur an extended ban, although a player's past disciplinary record (including prior competition) might have been considered by the disciplinary committee when punishing him. As a rule, only automatic red card offenses were considered for longer bans. A player who was sent off for picking up two yellow cards in the same match would not have had his automatic one-match ban extended by UEFA on account of what he did to get the second booking, because the referee deemed him as not to have committed an automatic red card offense.

If UEFA suspended a player after his team's elimination from the tournament, or for more games than the team ended up playing without him prior to the final or their elimination (whichever came first), then the remaining suspension was to be served during 2014 World Cup qualifying. For a particularly grave offense UEFA had the power to impose a lengthy ban against the offender.

=== Disciplinary statistics ===
- Total number of yellow cards: 123
- Average number of yellow cards per game: 3.97
- Total number of red cards: 3
- Average number of red cards per game: 0.10
- First yellow card: Sokratis Papastathopoulos – Greece against Poland
- First red card: Sokratis Papastathopoulos – Greece against Poland
- Fastest yellow card from kickoff: 10 minutes and 25 seconds – Kim Källström – Sweden against Ukraine
- Fastest yellow card after coming on as a substitute: 2 minutes and 51 seconds – Samuel Holmén – Sweden against France
- Latest yellow card in a match without extra time: 93 minutes and 47 seconds – José Holebas – Greece against Russia
- Fastest dismissal from kickoff: 44 minutes and 1 second – Sokratis Papastathopoulos – Greece against Poland
- Latest dismissal in a match without extra time: 88 minutes and 40 seconds – Keith Andrews – Republic of Ireland against Italy
- Latest dismissal in a match with extra time: N/A
- Least time difference between two yellow cards given to the same player: 9 minutes and 51 seconds – Sokratis Papastathopoulos – Greece against Poland
- Most yellow cards (team): 16 – Italy
- Most red cards (team): 1 – Greece, Republic of Ireland, Poland
- Fewest yellow cards (team): 4 – Denmark, Germany
- Most yellow cards (player): 3 – Keith Andrews (Republic of Ireland), Sokratis Papastathopoulos (Greece)
- Most red cards (player): 1 (three players) – Sokratis Papastathopoulos (Greece), Keith Andrews (Republic of Ireland), Wojciech Szczęsny (Poland)
- Most yellow cards (match): 9 – Portugal vs Spain
- Most red cards (match): 2 – Poland vs. Greece
- Fewest yellow cards (match): 0 – Russia vs. Czech Republic, Denmark vs. Germany

=== By individual ===
==== Red cards ====
Three red cards were shown over the course of the tournament's thirty one matches, an average of 0.10 red cards per match.

1 red card

- (Greece) Sokratis Papastathopoulos
- (Republic of Ireland) Keith Andrews
- (Poland) Wojciech Szczęsny

Source: UEFA

==== Yellow cards ====
123 yellow cards were shown over the course of the tournament's thirty one matches, an average of 3.97 yellow cards per match.

3 yellow cards

- (Greece) Sokratis Papastathopoulos
- (Republic of Ireland) Keith Andrews

2 yellow cards

- (Czech Republic) David Limberský
- (France) Jérémy Ménez
- (France) Philippe Mexès
- (Germany) Jérôme Boateng
- (Greece) José Holebas
- (Greece) Giorgos Karagounis
- (Republic of Ireland) Sean St Ledger
- (Italy) Mario Balotelli
- (Italy) Andrea Barzagli
- (Italy) Leonardo Bonucci
- (Italy) Daniele De Rossi
- (Italy) Christian Maggio
- (Italy) Thiago Motta
- (Netherlands) Jetro Willems
- (Poland) Eugen Polanski
- (Portugal) Fábio Coentrão
- (Portugal) João Pereira
- (Portugal) Miguel Veloso
- (Russia) Alan Dzagoev
- (Spain) Xabi Alonso
- (Spain) Álvaro Arbeloa
- (Spain) Sergio Ramos
- (Sweden) Anders Svensson
- (Ukraine) Anatoliy Tymoshchuk

1 yellow card

- (Croatia) Vedran Ćorluka
- (Croatia) Nikica Jelavić
- (Croatia) Niko Kranjčar
- (Croatia) Mario Mandžukić
- (Croatia) Luka Modrić
- (Croatia) Ivan Rakitić
- (Croatia) Gordon Schildenfeld
- (Croatia) Darijo Srna
- (Croatia) Ivan Strinić
- (Czech Republic) Petr Jiráček
- (Czech Republic) Daniel Kolář
- (Czech Republic) Tomáš Pekhart
- (Czech Republic) Jaroslav Plašil
- (Czech Republic) Tomáš Rosický
- (Denmark) Lars Jacobsen
- (Denmark) William Kvist
- (Denmark) Jakob Poulsen
- (Denmark) Simon Poulsen
- (England) Ashley Cole
- (England) Steven Gerrard
- (England) James Milner
- (England) Alex Oxlade-Chamberlain
- (England) Ashley Young
- (France) Yohan Cabaye
- (France) Mathieu Debuchy
- (Germany) Holger Badstuber
- (Germany) Mats Hummels
- (Greece) Kyriakos Papadopoulos
- (Greece) Dimitris Salpingidis
- (Greece) Georgios Samaras
- (Greece) Vasilis Torosidis
- (Republic of Ireland) Robbie Keane
- (Republic of Ireland) John O'Shea
- (Republic of Ireland) Glenn Whelan
- (Italy) Federico Balzaretti
- (Italy) Gianluigi Buffon
- (Italy) Giorgio Chiellini
- (Italy) Riccardo Montolivo
- (Netherlands) Mark van Bommel
- (Netherlands) Nigel de Jong
- (Netherlands) Robin van Persie
- (Poland) Jakub Błaszczykowski
- (Poland) Robert Lewandowski
- (Poland) Rafał Murawski
- (Poland) Damien Perquis
- (Poland) Marcin Wasilewski
- (Portugal) Bruno Alves
- (Portugal) Raul Meireles
- (Portugal) Nani
- (Portugal) Pepe
- (Portugal) Hélder Postiga
- (Portugal) Cristiano Ronaldo
- (Russia) Aleksandr Anyukov
- (Russia) Igor Denisov
- (Russia) Pavel Pogrebnyak
- (Russia) Yuri Zhirkov
- (Spain) Jordi Alba
- (Spain) Sergio Busquets
- (Spain) Javi Martínez
- (Spain) Gerard Piqué
- (Spain) Fernando Torres
- (Sweden) Rasmus Elm
- (Sweden) Samuel Holmén
- (Sweden) Kim Källström
- (Sweden) Olof Mellberg
- (Sweden) Jonas Olsson
- (Ukraine) Yaroslav Rakitskiy
- (Ukraine) Yevhen Selin
- (Ukraine) Andriy Shevchenko

=== By referee ===
Referee	Matches	Red	Yellow	Red Cards
(Turkey) Cüneyt Çakır	3	1	18	1 second yellow
(France) Stéphane Lannoy	3	0	15	0
(Portugal) Pedro Proença	4	0	12	0
(Hungary) Viktor Kassai	2	0	12	0
(Scotland) Craig Thomson	2	0	12	0
(Germany) Wolfgang Stark	2	0	10	0
(Slovenia) Damir Skomina	3	0	9	0
(Sweden) Jonas Eriksson	2	0	9	0
(Italy) Nicola Rizzoli	3	0	8	0
(Netherlands) Björn Kuipers	2	0	8	0
(England) Howard Webb	3	0	6	0
(Spain) Carlos Velasco Carballo	2	2	4	1 straight red 1 second yellow

=== By team ===
Team	Matches	Red	Yellow	Red Cards	Suspensions
Croatia	3	0	9		
Czech Republic	4	0	7		
Denmark	3	0	4		
England	4	0	5		W. Rooney v France & Sweden (due to red card in final qualifying match)
France	4	0	6		P. Mexès v Spain
Germany	5	0	4		J. Boateng v Denmark
Greece	4	1	11	S. Papastathopoulos v Poland second booking	S. Papastathopoulos v Czech Republic; J. Holebas & G. Karagounis v Germany
Republic of Ireland	3	1	8	K. Andrews v Italy second booking	
Italy	6	0	16		C. Maggio v Germany
Netherlands	3	0	5		
Poland	3	1	7	W. Szczęsny v Greece professional foul	W. Szczęsny v Russia
Portugal	5	0	12		
Russia	3	0	6		
Spain	6	0	11		
Sweden	3	0	7		
Ukraine	3	0	5		

=== Other sanctions ===
Penalised party	Sanction	Reason	Match
Croatian Football Federation	€25,000	Supporters' behaviour	vs Ireland
Croatian Football Federation	€80,000	Supporters' behaviour	vs Italy
Croatian Football Federation	€30,000	Supporters' behaviour	vs Spain
The Football Association (England)	€5,000	Supporters' behaviour	vs Sweden
Football Union of Russia	€120,000 + 6 point deduction in Euro 2016 qualifiers (suspended)	Supporters' behaviour	vs Czech Republic
Football Union of Russia	€30,000	Supporters' behaviour	vs Poland
Football Union of Russia	€35,000	Supporters' behaviour	vs Greece
Football Union of Russia	€30,000	Supporters' behaviour	vs Czech Republic
German Football Association	€10,000	Supporters' behaviour	vs Portugal
German Football Association	€25,000	Supporters' behaviour	vs Denmark
Nicklas Bendtner (Denmark)	€100,000 + one match ban in 2014 World Cup qualifiers	Improper conduct	vs Portugal
Portuguese Football Federation	€5,000	Players' behaviour	vs Germany
Portuguese Football Federation	€7,000	Supporters' behaviour	vs Czech Republic
Royal Spanish Football Federation	€20,000	Supporters' behaviour	vs Italy

== Overall statistics ==
Team	Pld	W	D	L	Pts	APts	GF	AGF	GA	AGA	GD	AGD	CS	ACS	YC	AYC	RC	ARC
Croatia	3	1	1	1	4	1.33	4	1.33	3	1.00	+1	0.33	0	0.00	9	3.00	0	0.00
Czech Republic	4	2	0	2	6	1.50	4	1.00	6	1.50	−2	−0.50	1	0.25	7	1.75	0	0.00
Denmark	3	1	0	2	3	1.00	4	1.33	5	1.67	−1	−0.33	1	0.33	4	1.33	0	0.00
England	4	2	2	0	8	2.00	5	1.25	3	0.75	+2	0.50	2	0.50	5	1.25	0	0.00
France	4	1	1	2	4	1.00	3	0.75	5	1.25	−2	−0.50	1	0.25	6	1.50	0	0.00
Germany	5	**4**	0	1	12	**2.40**	10	**2.00**	6	1.20	+4	0.80	1	0.20	4	0.80	0	0.00
Greece	4	1	1	2	4	1.00	5	1.25	7	1.75	−2	−0.50	1	0.25	11	**2.75**	**1**	0.25
Italy	**6**	2	**3**	1	9	1.50	6	1.00	7	1.17	−1	−0.17	2	0.33	**16**	2.67	0	0.00
Netherlands	3	0	0	**3**	0	0.00	2	0.67	5	1.67	−3	−1.00	0	0.00	5	1.67	0	0.00
Poland	3	0	2	1	2	0.67	2	0.67	3	1.00	−1	−0.33	0	0.00	7	2.33	**1**	**0.33**
Portugal	5	3	1	1	10	2.00	6	1.20	4	0.80	+2	0.40	2	0.40	12	2.40	0	0.00
Republic of Ireland	3	0	0	**3**	0	0.00	1	0.33	**9**	**3.00**	−8	−2.67	0	0.00	8	2.67	**1**	**0.33**
Russia	3	1	1	1	4	1.33	5	1.67	3	1.00	+2	0.67	0	0.00	6	2.00	0	0.00
**Spain**	**6**	**4**	2	0	**14**	2.33	**12**	**2.00**	1	0.17	**+11**	**1.83**	**5**	**0.83**	11	1.83	0	0.00
Sweden	3	1	0	2	3	1.00	5	1.67	5	1.67	0	0.00	1	0.33	7	2.33	0	0.00
Ukraine	3	1	0	2	3	1.00	2	0.67	4	1.33	−2	−0.67	0	0.00	5	1.67	0	0.00
Total	31^{(1)}	24	7^{(2)}	24	86	1.39	76	1.23	76	1.23	0	0.00	17	0.27	123	1.98	3	0.05

Team(s) rendered in italics represent(s) the host nation(s). The competition's winning team is rendered in bold.
^{(1)} – Total games lost not counted in total games played (total games lost = total games won)
^{(2)} – Total number of games drawn (tied) for all teams = Total number of games drawn (tied) ÷ 2 (both teams involved)
^{(3)} – As per statistical convention in football, matches decided in extra time are counted as wins and losses, while matches decided by penalty shoot-outs are counted as draws.
