= Poland at the UEFA European Championship =

International football delegation

Poland have participated in five UEFA European Championships so far, all consecutively: Euro 2008, Euro 2012, Euro 2016, Euro 2020 and Euro 2024.

While the UEFA European Championship was first established in 1960, it took Poland as many as 48 years to qualify, by which time they had managed to attend five FIFA World Cup finals and win third place in two of them. By the end of the Cold War, Poland were the second most populated UEFA member state to have yet to compete in a Euro tournament (the most populated being Turkey), behind quite a few of their smaller neighbors, such as Czechoslovakia. Even some of the best coaches to ever run the Poland team, namely Kazimierz Górski and Antoni Piechniczek proved unable to break the humiliating succession of defeats. In 1996, Turkey and newly independent Russia made their Euro debuts, making Poland and newly independent Ukraine the only major UEFA member states to not have qualified for a European tournament (with Poland eventually beating Ukraine to making their debut first). Overall, Poland missed twelve European tournaments before qualifying for one for a first time.

The long-awaited qualification finally came in 2008 although Poland proved disappointing, ending last in the group stage, a scenario which would be repeated four years later, though drawing against Greece, Russia and the Czech Republic. The 2012 performance was especially criticized, with many suggesting that Poland would not have even qualified for the tournament had it not been one of the hosts. The next tournament, Euro 2016, proved historic as Poland got their first win in a European Championship with a 1–0 win over Northern Ireland and eventually made it to the quarter-finals before losing to Portugal on penalties and securing the best result for the Poland team since their well-remembered third place at the 1982 FIFA World Cup.

== Euro 2008 ==
Poland's qualification to the UEFA Euro 2008 marked their first appearance in the tournament. Despite qualifying for the tournament with an impressing campaign, edging Portugal to first place in their qualifying group, the tournament would be a disappointing debut with one point from three matches.

In a rematch from the 2006 FIFA World Cup, Poland took on Germany in the first game. Although the Poles were far from dominated in the game and created many chances, the match ended with a victory for Germany with the final score being 2–0. Lukas Podolski the Polish-born German striker scored the two goals for Germany in the game. In the second game Poland would take on the co-hosts Austria in Vienna. Roger Guerreiro opened the scoring for Poland in the 30th minute. Austria equalized in stoppage time in the 93rd minute after a controversial penalty, which the Austrian striker Ivica Vastić converted making the final score 1–1. In any hopes of qualifying Poland would need a large victory in their last game against Croatia. However, Croatia went on to beat Poland 1–0 and eliminated them from the tournament.

The Polish Football Association did not hold the coach Leo Beenhakker responsible for the disappointing performance and allowed him to keep his job for the 2010 World Cup qualifying. While Poland ended up at the bottom of the group for a third time in the 2000s, the sentiment prevalent in the Polish media was that of bad luck rather than any real lack of skill and most of public opinion was in favour of Beenhakker leading the national team to South Africa. The qualification round that followed, however, proved so disastrous and humiliating that Beenhakker lost any support in the Football Association, the press, and his own team itself, after which was promptly sacked.

=== Group stage ===
Pos	Team	Pld	W	D	L	GF	GA	GD	Pts	Qualification
1	Croatia	3	3	0	0	4	1	+3	9	Advance to knockout stage
2	Germany	3	2	0	1	4	2	+2	6	Advance to knockout stage
3	Austria (H)	3	0	1	2	1	3	−2	1 (Note: Tied on head-to-head result (Austria 1–1 Poland). Overall goal difference was used as the tiebreaker.)	
4	Poland	3	0	1	2	1	4	−3	1	

Source: UEFA
Rules for classification: Group stage tiebreakers
(H) Hosts
Notes:
8 June 2008
20:45

Germany	2–0	Poland
Podolski 20', 72'	Report

Wörthersee Stadion, Klagenfurt
Attendance: 30,461
Referee: Tom Henning Øvrebø (Norway)

12 June 2008
20:45

Austria	1–1	Poland
Vastić 90+3' (pen.)	Report	Guerreiro 30'

Ernst-Happel-Stadion, Vienna
Attendance: 51,428
Referee: Howard Webb (England)

16 June 2008
20:45

Poland	0–1	Croatia
	Report	Klasnić 53'

Wörthersee Stadion, Klagenfurt
Attendance: 30,461
Referee: Kyros Vassaras (Greece)

== Euro 2012 ==
On 18 April 2007 in Cardiff, Wales, Poland along with Ukraine were elected by the UEFA's executive committee to co-host the 2012 UEFA European Championship, which was the 14th edition of the tournament. Poland, automatically seeded in Group A, were drawn with Russia, Greece and the Czech Republic. While Poland's poor performance at the last World Cup qualification was not forgotten, many hoped that the omnipresent sense of national pride as well as the honour of playing at home would push the team, composed of some prominent Bundesliga players, such as Jakub Błaszczykowski, Robert Lewandowski and Łukasz Piszczek, to their limits. Consequently, the initial reception of the first two matches, which ended in a draw (against Greece and Russia respectively), was somewhat positive, leaving public opinion moderately optimistic about the result of the final game against the Czech Republic. All hopes were shattered though and the Czech Republic won 1–0, leaving Poland at the bottom of their group once again, this time, to make things even worse, on home soil.

=== Group stage ===
Pos	Team	Pld	W	D	L	GF	GA	GD	Pts	Qualification
1	Czech Republic	3	2	0	1	4	5	−1	6	Advance to knockout stage
2	Greece	3	1	1	1	3	3	0	4 (Note: Head-to-head result: Greece 1–0 Russia.)	Advance to knockout stage
3	Russia	3	1	1	1	5	3	+2	4	
4	Poland (H)	3	0	2	1	2	3	−1	2	

Source: UEFA
Rules for classification: Group stage tiebreakers
(H) Hosts
Notes:
8 June 2012
18:00 CEST

Poland	1–1	Greece
Lewandowski 17'	Report	Salpingidis 51'

National Stadium, Warsaw
Attendance: 56,070
Referee: Carlos Velasco Carballo (Spain)

12 June 2012
20:45 CEST

Poland	1–1	Russia
Błaszczykowski 57'	Report	Dzagoev 37'

National Stadium, Warsaw
Attendance: 55,920
Referee: Wolfgang Stark (Germany)

16 June 2012
20:45 CEST

Czech Republic	1–0	Poland
Jiráček 72'	Report

Stadion Miejski, Wrocław
Attendance: 41,480
Referee: Craig Thomson (Scotland)

== Euro 2016 ==
Poland once again failed to qualify for the 2014 FIFA World Cup in Brazil, even though the scale of their defeat was not even close to that from four years before. Under a new management of Adam Nawałka, the team managed to make it smoothly through the qualification to Euro 2016 in France, their third European tournament ever. The team advanced to the knockout stage from the second place (behind Germany), after which it knocked out Switzerland on penalties, only to be given the taste of the very same treatment in the following quarterfinal game against Portugal.

Nawałka adapted an extremely defensive tactic, all but eliminating one of the major Polish flaws at previous tournaments: the tendency to lose goals as a result of small mistakes. During the whole tournament, Poland conceded as few as two goals, both of which were considered highly sophisticated and difficult to block. Compared with the defense, however, the offensive left much to be desired, with Robert Lewandowski scoring his only solitary goal in the last game and, together with Arkadiusz Milik, notoriously missing out on perfect scoring opportunities. Nevertheless, the tournament was viewed as successful in Poland and Nawałka was invited to lead the team in the qualification to the 2018 World Cup.

=== Group stage ===
Pos	Team	Pld	W	D	L	GF	GA	GD	Pts	Qualification
1	Germany	3	2	1	0	3	0	+3	7 (Note: Tied on head-to-head result (Germany 0–0 Poland). Overall goal difference was used as the tiebreaker.)	Advance to knockout stage
2	Poland	3	2	1	0	2	0	+2	7	Advance to knockout stage
3	Northern Ireland	3	1	0	2	2	2	0	3	Advance to knockout stage
4	Ukraine	3	0	0	3	0	5	−5	0	

Source: UEFA
Rules for classification: Group stage tiebreakers
Notes:
12 June 2016
18:00

Poland	1–0	Northern Ireland
Milik 51'	Report

Stade de Nice, Nice
Attendance: 33,742
Referee: Ovidiu Hațegan (Romania)

16 June 2016
21:00

Germany	0–0	Poland
	Report

Stade de France, Saint-Denis
Attendance: 73,648
Referee: Björn Kuipers (Netherlands)

21 June 2016
18:00

Ukraine	0–1	Poland
	Report	Błaszczykowski 54'

Stade Vélodrome, Marseille
Attendance: 58,874
Referee: Svein Oddvar Moen (Norway)

=== Knockout stage ===
Round of 16

25 June 2016
15:00

Switzerland	1–1 (a.e.t.)	Poland
Shaqiri 82'	Report	Błaszczykowski 39'
Penalties
Lichtsteiner (penalty scored); Xhaka (penalty missed); Shaqiri (penalty scored); Schär (penalty scored); Rodríguez (penalty scored)	4–5	(penalty scored) Lewandowski; (penalty scored) Milik; (penalty scored) Glik; (penalty scored) Błaszczykowski; (penalty scored) Krychowiak

Stade Geoffroy-Guichard, Saint-Étienne
Attendance: 38,842
Referee: Mark Clattenburg (England)

Quarter-finals

30 June 2016
21:00

Poland	1–1 (a.e.t.)	Portugal
Lewandowski 2'	Report	Sanches 33'
Penalties
Lewandowski (penalty scored); Milik (penalty scored); Glik (penalty scored); Błaszczykowski (penalty missed)	3–5	(penalty scored) Ronaldo; (penalty scored) Sanches; (penalty scored) Moutinho; (penalty scored) Nani; (penalty scored) Quaresma

Stade Vélodrome, Marseille
Attendance: 62,940
Referee: Felix Brych (Germany)

== Euro 2020 ==
Poland managed to qualify for the UEFA Euro 2020 but not without skepticism after some of Poland's poor performance in qualifiers. However, Poland was unfortunate to be drawn with two very strong opponents, Spain and Sweden. The last opponent was Slovakia who won the Euro qualifiers play-offs over Northern Ireland.

The tournament was a major catastrophe for the Polish side, as the team started its run with a shock 1–2 defeat to Slovakia, with Wojciech Szczęsny registered to the history in an unfabulous style as the first goalkeeper to score an own goal. Poland then fought back to gain a respectable 1–1 draw to Spain in Seville, all thanks to Robert Lewandowski, who then scored two goals in Poland's eventual 2–3 defeat to Sweden to end Poland's tournament in a disappointing last-place finish. Both lost matches of Poland took place in Saint Petersburg.

=== Group stage ===
Pos	Team	Pld	W	D	L	GF	GA	GD	Pts	Qualification
1	Sweden	3	2	1	0	4	2	+2	7	Advance to knockout stage
2	Spain (H)	3	1	2	0	6	1	+5	5	Advance to knockout stage
3	Slovakia	3	1	0	2	2	7	−5	3	
4	Poland	3	0	1	2	4	6	−2	1	

Source: UEFA
Rules for classification: Group stage tiebreakers
(H) Hosts
14 June 2021
18:00 (19:00 UTC+3)

Poland	1–2	Slovakia
Linetty 46'	Report	Szczęsny 18' (o.g.); Škriniar 69'

Krestovsky Stadium, Saint Petersburg
Attendance: 12,862
Referee: Ovidiu Hațegan (Romania)

19 June 2021
21:00

Spain	1–1	Poland
Morata 25'	Report	Lewandowski 54'

Estadio de La Cartuja, Seville
Attendance: 11,742
Referee: Daniele Orsato (Italy)

23 June 2021
18:00 (19:00 UTC+3)

Sweden	3–2	Poland
Forsberg 2', 59'; Claesson 90+4'	Report	Lewandowski 61', 84'

Krestovsky Stadium, Saint Petersburg
Attendance: 14,252
Referee: Michael Oliver (England)

== Euro 2024 ==
=== Group stage ===
Pos	Team	Pld	W	D	L	GF	GA	GD	Pts	Qualification
1	Austria	3	2	0	1	6	4	+2	6	Advance to knockout stage
2	France	3	1	2	0	2	1	+1	5	Advance to knockout stage
3	Netherlands	3	1	1	1	4	4	0	4	Advance to knockout stage
4	Poland	3	0	1	2	3	6	−3	1	

Source: UEFA
16 June 2024
15:00

Poland	1–2	Netherlands
Buksa 16'	Report	Gakpo 29'; Weghorst 83'

Volksparkstadion, Hamburg
Attendance: 48,117
Referee: Artur Soares Dias (Portugal)

21 June 2024
18:00

Poland	1–3	Austria
Piątek 30'	Report	Trauner 9'; Baumgartner 66'; Arnautović 78' (pen.)

Olympiastadion, Berlin
Attendance: 69,455
Referee: Halil Umut Meler (Turkey)

25 June 2024
18:00

France	1–1	Poland
Mbappé 56' (pen.)	Report	Lewandowski 79' (pen.)

Westfalenstadion, Dortmund
Attendance: 59,728
Referee: Marco Guida (Italy)

== Record players ==
Rank	Player	Matches	Euros
1	Robert Lewandowski	13	2012, 2016, 2020 and 2024
2	Jakub Błaszczykowski	8	2012 and 2016
2	Kamil Glik	8	2016 and 2020
2	Łukasz Piszczek	8	2008, 2012 and 2016
5	Kamil Grosicki	7	2012, 2016 and 2024
5	Grzegorz Krychowiak	7	2016 and 2020
5	Wojciech Szczęsny	7	2012, 2016, 2020 and 2024
5	Piotr Zieliński	7	2016, 2020 and 2024
9	Jan Bednarek	4	2020 and 2024
9	Przemysław Frankowski	4	2020 and 2024
9	Karol Świderski	4	2020 and 2024
9	Marcin Wasilewski	4	2008 and 2012

== Goalscorers ==
Player	Goals	2008	2012	2016	2020	2024
Robert Lewandowski	6		1	1	3	1
Jakub Błaszczykowski	3		1	2		
Adam Buksa	1					1
Roger Guerreiro	1	1				
Karol Linetty	1				1	
Arkadiusz Milik	1			1		
Krzysztof Piątek	1					1
Total	13	1	2	4	4	3

== Overall record ==
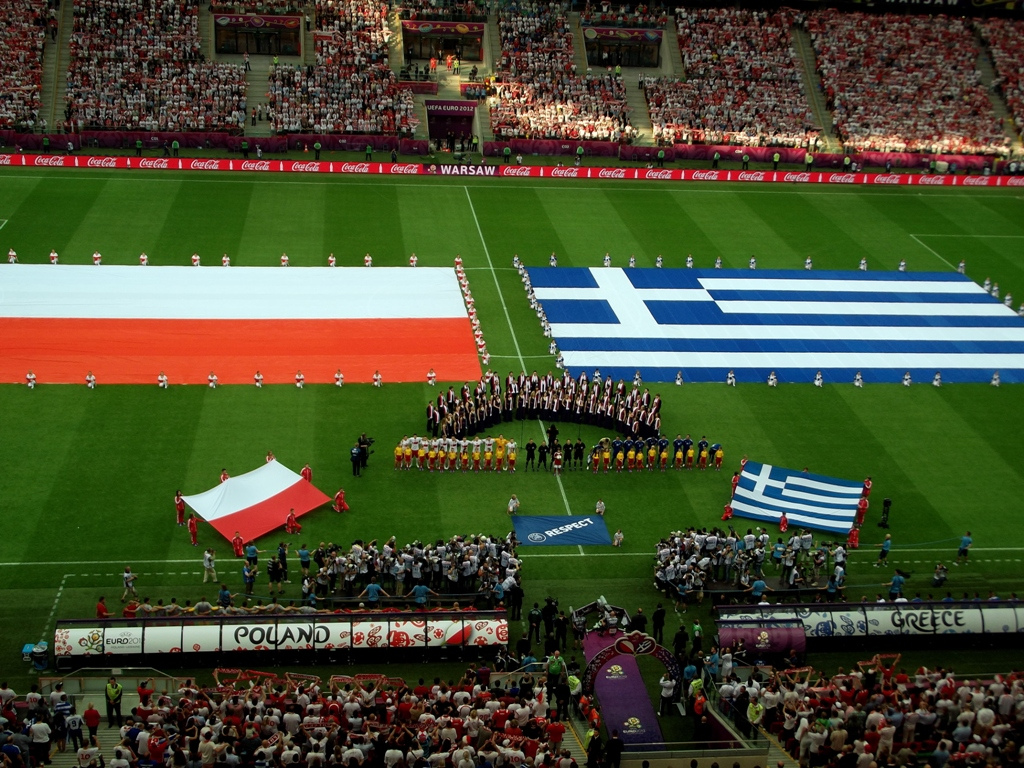
UEFA Euro 2012 opening match Poland–Greece

UEFA European Championship record
Year	Round	Position	Pld	W	D*	L	GF	GA
(France) 1960	Did not qualify							
(Spain) 1964	Did not qualify							
(Italy) 1968	Did not qualify							
(Belgium) 1972	Did not qualify							
(Socialist Federal Republic of Yugoslavia) 1976	Did not qualify							
(Italy) 1980	Did not qualify							
(France) 1984	Did not qualify							
(West Germany) 1988	Did not qualify							
(Sweden) 1992	Did not qualify							
(England) 1996	Did not qualify							
(Belgium) (Netherlands) 2000	Did not qualify							
(Portugal) 2004	Did not qualify							
(Austria) (Switzerland) 2008	Group stage	14th	3	0	1	2	1	4
(Poland) (Ukraine) 2012	Group stage	14th	3	0	2	1	2	3
(France) 2016	Quarter-finals	5th	5	2	3	0	4	2
(Europe) 2020	Group stage	21st	3	0	1	2	4	6
(Germany) 2024	Group stage	23rd	3	0	1	2	3	6
(United Kingdom) (Republic of Ireland) 2028	To be determined							
(Italy) (Turkey) 2032	To be determined							
Total	Quarter-finals	5/17	17	2	8	7	14	21

== See also ==
- Poland at the FIFA World Cup
