= UEFA Euro 2012 knockout stage =

International football tournament stage

The knockout stage of UEFA Euro 2012 began with the quarter-finals on 21 June 2012, and was completed on 1 July 2012 with the final at the Olympic Stadium in Kyiv, won by Spain. After the completion of the group stage on 19 June 2012, eight teams qualified for the quarter-finals (two from each group), which were played from 21 to 24 June 2012. Host nations Poland and Ukraine failed to qualify for the quarter-finals, making it only the third time in European Championship history that the host nation(s) failed to make it out of the group stage; at Euro 2000, co-host Belgium were eliminated at the group stage, and at Euro 2008, co-hosts Austria and Switzerland also failed to qualify for the quarter-finals.

== Format ==
Any game in the knockout stage that was undecided by the end of the regular 90 minutes was followed by 30 minutes of extra time (two 15-minute halves). If scores were still level after 30 minutes of extra time, there would be a penalty shootout (at least five penalties each, and more if necessary) to determine who progressed to the next round. As with every tournament since UEFA Euro 1984, there was no third place play-off.

== Qualified teams ==
The top two placed teams from each of the four groups qualified for the knockout stage.

Group	Winners	Runners-up
A	Czech Republic	Greece
B	Germany	Portugal
C	Spain	Italy
D	England	France

== Bracket ==
Quarter-finals
21 June – Warsaw
Czech Republic	0
Portugal	1
23 June – Donetsk
Spain	2
France	0
22 June – Gdańsk
Germany	4
Greece	2
24 June – Kyiv
England	0 (2)
Italy (p)	0 (4)

Semi-finals
27 June – Donetsk
Portugal	0 (2)
Spain (p)	0 (4)
28 June – Warsaw
Germany	1
Italy	2

Final
1 July – Kyiv
Spain	4
Italy	0

== Quarter-finals ==
=== Czech Republic vs Portugal ===
21 June 2012
20:45 CEST

Czech Republic	0–1	Portugal
	Report	Ronaldo 79'

National Stadium, Warsaw
Attendance: 55,590
Referee: Howard Webb (England)

Czech Republic	Portugal

GK	1	Petr Čech (c)
RB	2	Theodor Gebre Selassie
CB	6	Tomáš Sivok
CB	3	Michal Kadlec
LB	8	David Limberský	(yellow card) 90'
CM	17	Tomáš Hübschman		(substituted off) 86'
CM	13	Jaroslav Plašil
RW	19	Petr Jiráček
AM	22	Vladimír Darida		(substituted off) 61'
LW	14	Václav Pilař
CF	15	Milan Baroš
Substitutions:
MF	9	Jan Rezek		(substituted on) 61'
FW	20	Tomáš Pekhart		(substituted on) 86'
Manager:
Michal Bílek

GK	12	Rui Patrício
RB	21	João Pereira
CB	3	Pepe
CB	2	Bruno Alves
LB	5	Fábio Coentrão
CM	16	Raul Meireles		(substituted off) 88'
CM	4	Miguel Veloso	(yellow card) 27'
CM	8	João Moutinho
RF	17	Nani	(yellow card) 26'	(substituted off) 84'
CF	23	Hélder Postiga		(substituted off) 40'
LF	7	Cristiano Ronaldo (c)
Substitutions:
FW	9	Hugo Almeida		(substituted on) 40'
MF	6	Custódio		(substituted on) 84'
DF	14	Rolando		(substituted on) 88'
Manager:
Paulo Bento

Man of the Match:
Cristiano Ronaldo (Portugal)

Assistant referees:
Michael Mullarkey (England)
Sander van Roekel (Netherlands)
Fourth official:
Jonas Eriksson (Sweden)
Additional assistant referees:
Martin Atkinson (England)
Mark Clattenburg (England)
Reserve assistant referee:
Stefan Wittberg (Sweden)

=== Germany vs Greece ===
22 June 2012
20:45 CEST

Germany	4–2	Greece
Lahm 39'; Khedira 61'; Klose 68'; Reus 74'	Report	Samaras 55'; Salpingidis 89' (pen.)

PGE Arena, Gdańsk
Attendance: 38,751
Referee: Damir Skomina (Slovenia)

Germany	Greece

GK	1	Manuel Neuer
RB	20	Jérôme Boateng
CB	5	Mats Hummels
CB	14	Holger Badstuber
LB	16	Philipp Lahm (c)
CM	6	Sami Khedira
CM	7	Bastian Schweinsteiger
RW	21	Marco Reus	(substituted off) 80'
AM	8	Mesut Özil
LW	9	André Schürrle	(substituted off) 67'
CF	11	Miroslav Klose	(substituted off) 80'
Substitutions:
MF	13	Thomas Müller	(substituted on) 67'
FW	23	Mario Gómez	(substituted on) 80'
MF	19	Mario Götze	(substituted on) 80'
Manager:
Joachim Löw

GK	13	Michalis Sifakis
RB	15	Vasilis Torosidis
CB	19	Sokratis Papastathopoulos	(yellow card) 75'
CB	5	Kyriakos Papadopoulos
LB	3	Georgios Tzavelas		(substituted off) 46'
CM	6	Grigoris Makos		(substituted off) 72'
CM	2	Ioannis Maniatis
RW	18	Sotiris Ninis		(substituted off) 46'
AM	21	Kostas Katsouranis (c)
LW	7	Georgios Samaras	(yellow card) 14'
CF	14	Dimitris Salpingidis
Substitutions:
FW	17	Theofanis Gekas		(substituted on) 46'
MF	16	Georgios Fotakis		(substituted on) 46'
FW	9	Nikos Liberopoulos		(substituted on) 72'
Manager:
(Portugal) Fernando Santos

Man of the Match:
Mesut Özil (Germany)

Assistant referees:
Primož Arhar (Slovenia)
Matej Žunič (Slovenia)
Fourth official:
Stéphane Lannoy (France)
Additional assistant referees:
Slavko Vinčić (Slovenia)
Matej Jug (Slovenia)
Reserve assistant referee:
Frédéric Cano (France)

=== Spain vs France ===
23 June 2012
21:45 EEST

Spain	2–0	France
Alonso 19', 90+1' (pen.)	Report

Donbas Arena, Donetsk
Attendance: 47,000
Referee: Nicola Rizzoli (Italy)

Spain	France

GK	1	Iker Casillas (c)
RB	17	Álvaro Arbeloa
CB	3	Gerard Piqué
CB	15	Sergio Ramos	(yellow card) 31'
LB	18	Jordi Alba
RM	8	Xavi
CM	16	Sergio Busquets
LM	14	Xabi Alonso
RF	21	David Silva		(substituted off) 65'
CF	10	Cesc Fàbregas		(substituted off) 67'
LF	6	Andrés Iniesta		(substituted off) 84'
Substitutions:
FW	7	Pedro		(substituted on) 65'
FW	9	Fernando Torres		(substituted on) 67'
MF	20	Santi Cazorla		(substituted on) 84'
Manager:
Vicente del Bosque

GK	1	Hugo Lloris (c)
RB	13	Anthony Réveillère
CB	4	Adil Rami
CB	21	Laurent Koscielny
LB	22	Gaël Clichy
DM	17	Yann M'Vila		(substituted off) 79'
CM	6	Yohan Cabaye	(yellow card) 42'
CM	15	Florent Malouda		(substituted off) 65'
RW	2	Mathieu Debuchy		(substituted off) 64'
LW	7	Franck Ribéry
CF	10	Karim Benzema
Substitutions:
MF	14	Jérémy Ménez	(yellow card) 76'	(substituted on) 64'
MF	11	Samir Nasri		(substituted on) 65'
FW	9	Olivier Giroud		(substituted on) 79'
Manager:
Laurent Blanc

Man of the Match:
Xabi Alonso (Spain)

Assistant referees:
Renato Faverani (Italy)
Andrea Stefani (Italy)
Fourth official:
Craig Thomson (Scotland)
Additional assistant referees:
Gianluca Rocchi (Italy)
Paolo Tagliavento (Italy)
Reserve assistant referee:
Alasdair Ross (Scotland)

=== England vs Italy ===
24 June 2012
21:45 EEST

England	0–0 (a.e.t.)	Italy
	Report
Penalties
Gerrard (penalty scored); Rooney (penalty scored); Young (penalty missed); Cole (penalty missed)	2–4	(penalty scored) Balotelli; (penalty missed) Montolivo; (penalty scored) Pirlo; (penalty scored) Nocerino; (penalty scored) Diamanti

Olympic Stadium, Kyiv
Attendance: 64,340
Referee: Pedro Proença (Portugal)

England	Italy

GK	1	Joe Hart
RB	2	Glen Johnson
CB	6	John Terry
CB	15	Joleon Lescott
LB	3	Ashley Cole
CM	4	Steven Gerrard (c)
CM	17	Scott Parker	(substituted off) 94'
RW	16	James Milner	(substituted off) 61'
LW	11	Ashley Young
SS	10	Wayne Rooney
CF	22	Danny Welbeck	(substituted off) 60'
Substitutions:
FW	9	Andy Carroll	(substituted on) 60'
MF	7	Theo Walcott	(substituted on) 61'
MF	8	Jordan Henderson	(substituted on) 94'
Manager:
Roy Hodgson

GK	1	Gianluigi Buffon (c)
RB	7	Ignazio Abate		(substituted off) 90+1'
CB	15	Andrea Barzagli	(yellow card) 82'
CB	19	Leonardo Bonucci
LB	6	Federico Balzaretti
DM	21	Andrea Pirlo
RW	8	Claudio Marchisio
AM	18	Riccardo Montolivo
LW	16	Daniele De Rossi		(substituted off) 80'
CF	9	Mario Balotelli
CF	10	Antonio Cassano		(substituted off) 78'
Substitutions:
MF	22	Alessandro Diamanti		(substituted on) 78'
MF	23	Antonio Nocerino		(substituted on) 80'
DF	2	Christian Maggio	(yellow card) 94'	(substituted on) 90+1'
Manager:
Cesare Prandelli

Man of the Match:
Andrea Pirlo (Italy)

Assistant referees:
Bertino Miranda (Portugal)
Ricardo Santos (Portugal)
Fourth official:
Cüneyt Çakır (Turkey)
Additional assistant referees:
Jorge Sousa (Portugal)
Duarte Gomes (Portugal)
Reserve assistant referee:
Bahattin Duran (Turkey)

== Semi-finals ==
=== Portugal vs Spain ===
27 June 2012
21:45 EEST

Portugal	0–0 (a.e.t.)	Spain
	Report
Penalties
Moutinho (penalty missed); Pepe (penalty scored); Nani (penalty scored); Alves (penalty missed)	2–4	(penalty missed) Alonso; (penalty scored) Iniesta; (penalty scored) Piqué; (penalty scored) Ramos; (penalty scored) Fàbregas

Donbas Arena, Donetsk
Attendance: 48,000
Referee: Cüneyt Çakır (Turkey)

Portugal	Spain

GK	12	Rui Patrício
RB	21	João Pereira	(yellow card) 64'
CB	3	Pepe	(yellow card) 61'
CB	2	Bruno Alves	(yellow card) 86'
LB	5	Fábio Coentrão	(yellow card) 45'
CM	16	Raul Meireles		(substituted off) 113'
CM	4	Miguel Veloso	(yellow card) 90+3'	(substituted off) 106'
CM	8	João Moutinho
RF	17	Nani
CF	9	Hugo Almeida		(substituted off) 81'
LF	7	Cristiano Ronaldo (c)
Substitutions:
FW	11	Nélson Oliveira		(substituted on) 81'
MF	6	Custódio		(substituted on) 106'
FW	18	Silvestre Varela		(substituted on) 113'
Manager:
Paulo Bento

GK	1	Iker Casillas (c)
RB	17	Álvaro Arbeloa	(yellow card) 84'
CB	3	Gerard Piqué
CB	15	Sergio Ramos	(yellow card) 40'
LB	18	Jordi Alba
CM	8	Xavi		(substituted off) 87'
CM	16	Sergio Busquets	(yellow card) 60'
CM	14	Xabi Alonso	(yellow card) 113'
RF	21	David Silva		(substituted off) 60'
CF	11	Álvaro Negredo		(substituted off) 54'
LF	6	Andrés Iniesta
Substitutions:
MF	10	Cesc Fàbregas		(substituted on) 54'
MF	22	Jesús Navas		(substituted on) 60'
FW	7	Pedro		(substituted on) 87'
Manager:
Vicente del Bosque

Man of the Match:
Sergio Ramos (Spain)

Assistant referees:
Bahattin Duran (Turkey)
Tarık Ongun (Turkey)
Fourth official:
Damir Skomina (Slovenia)
Additional assistant referees:
Hüseyin Göçek (Turkey)
Bülent Yıldırım (Turkey)
Reserve assistant referee:
Matej Žunič (Slovenia)

=== Germany vs Italy ===
28 June 2012
20:45 CEST

Germany	1–2	Italy
Özil 90+2' (pen.)	Report	Balotelli 20', 36'

National Stadium, Warsaw
Attendance: 55,540
Referee: Stéphane Lannoy (France)

Germany	Italy

GK	1	Manuel Neuer
RB	20	Jérôme Boateng		(substituted off) 71'
CB	5	Mats Hummels	(yellow card) 90+4'
CB	14	Holger Badstuber
LB	16	Philipp Lahm (c)
CM	7	Bastian Schweinsteiger
CM	6	Sami Khedira
RW	18	Toni Kroos
AM	8	Mesut Özil
LW	10	Lukas Podolski		(substituted off) 46'
CF	23	Mario Gómez		(substituted off) 46'
Substitutions:
FW	11	Miroslav Klose		(substituted on) 46'
MF	21	Marco Reus		(substituted on) 46'
MF	13	Thomas Müller		(substituted on) 71'
Manager:
Joachim Löw

GK	1	Gianluigi Buffon (c)
RB	6	Federico Balzaretti
CB	15	Andrea Barzagli
CB	19	Leonardo Bonucci	(yellow card) 61'
LB	3	Giorgio Chiellini
DM	21	Andrea Pirlo
RW	8	Claudio Marchisio
AM	18	Riccardo Montolivo		(substituted off) 64'
LW	16	Daniele De Rossi	(yellow card) 84'
CF	9	Mario Balotelli	(yellow card) 37'	(substituted off) 70'
CF	10	Antonio Cassano		(substituted off) 58'
Substitutions:
MF	22	Alessandro Diamanti		(substituted on) 58'
MF	5	Thiago Motta	(yellow card) 89'	(substituted on) 64'
FW	11	Antonio Di Natale		(substituted on) 70'
Manager:
Cesare Prandelli

Man of the Match:
Andrea Pirlo (Italy)

Assistant referees:
Frédéric Cano (France)
Michaël Annonier (France)
Fourth official:
Howard Webb (England)
Additional assistant referees:
Fredy Fautrel (France)
Ruddy Buquet (France)
Reserve assistant referee:
Michael Mullarkey (England)

== Final ==
1 July 2012
21:45 EEST

Spain	4–0	Italy
Silva 14'; Alba 41'; Torres 84'; Mata 88'	Report

Olympic Stadium, Kyiv
Attendance: 63,170
Referee: Pedro Proença (Portugal)

Spain	Italy

GK	1	Iker Casillas (c)
RB	17	Álvaro Arbeloa
CB	3	Gerard Piqué	(yellow card) 25'
CB	15	Sergio Ramos
LB	18	Jordi Alba
DM	16	Sergio Busquets
CM	8	Xavi
CM	14	Xabi Alonso
CM	10	Cesc Fàbregas		(substituted off) 75'
AM	21	David Silva		(substituted off) 59'
AM	6	Andrés Iniesta		(substituted off) 87'
Substitutions:
FW	7	Pedro		(substituted on) 59'
FW	9	Fernando Torres		(substituted on) 75'
MF	13	Juan Mata		(substituted on) 87'
Manager:
Vicente del Bosque

GK	1	Gianluigi Buffon (c)
RB	7	Ignazio Abate
CB	15	Andrea Barzagli	(yellow card) 45'
CB	19	Leonardo Bonucci
LB	3	Giorgio Chiellini		(substituted off) 21'
DM	21	Andrea Pirlo
RW	8	Claudio Marchisio
AM	18	Riccardo Montolivo		(substituted off) 57'
LW	16	Daniele De Rossi
CF	9	Mario Balotelli
CF	10	Antonio Cassano		(substituted off) 46'
Substitutions:
DF	6	Federico Balzaretti		(substituted on) 21'
FW	11	Antonio Di Natale		(substituted on) 46'
MF	5	Thiago Motta		(substituted on) 57'
Manager:
Cesare Prandelli

Man of the Match:
Andrés Iniesta (Spain)

Assistant referees:
Bertino Miranda (Portugal)
Ricardo Santos (Portugal)
Fourth official:
Cüneyt Çakır (Turkey)
Additional assistant referees:
Jorge Sousa (Portugal)
Duarte Gomes (Portugal)
Reserve assistant referee:
Bahattin Duran (Turkey)
