= UEFA Euro 2012 Group A =

Football tournament group stage

Group A of UEFA Euro 2012 was played from 8 to 16 June 2012. The pool was made up of co-host Poland, Czech Republic, Greece and Russia. The top two finishing teams, Czech Republic and Greece, progressed to the quarter-finals, while Russia and Poland were eliminated from the tournament.

== Teams ==
Draw position	Team	Pot	Method of qualification	Date of qualification	Finals appearance	Last appearance	Previous best performance	UEFA Rankings November 2011 (Note: The UEFA rankings of November 2011 were used for seeding for the final draw.)	FIFA Rankings June 2012
A1	Poland	1	Co-host	18 April 2007	2nd	2008	Group stage (2008)	28	62
A2	Greece	3	Group F winner	11 October 2011	4th	2008	Winners (2004)	8	15
A3	Russia (Note: From 1960 to 1988, Russia competed as the Soviet Union, and in 1992 as CIS.)	2	Group B winner	11 October 2011	10th	2008	Winners (1960)	6	13
A4	Czech Republic (Note: From 1960 to 1980, the Czech Republic competed as Czechoslovakia.)	4	Play-off winner	15 November 2011	8th	2008	Winners (1976)	13	27

== Standings ==
Pos	Team	Pld	W	D	L	GF	GA	GD	Pts	Qualification
1	Czech Republic	3	2	0	1	4	5	−1	6	Advance to knockout stage
2	Greece	3	1	1	1	3	3	0	4 (Note: Head-to-head result: Greece 1–0 Russia.)	Advance to knockout stage
3	Russia	3	1	1	1	5	3	+2	4	
4	Poland (H)	3	0	2	1	2	3	−1	2	

Source: UEFA
Rules for classification: Group stage tiebreakers
(H) Hosts
Notes:

In the quarter-finals,

- The winner of Group A, Czech Republic, advanced to play the runner-up of Group B, Portugal.
- The runner-up of Group A, Greece, advanced to play the winner of Group B, Germany.

== Matches ==
=== Poland vs Greece ===
8 June 2012
18:00

Poland	1–1	Greece
Lewandowski 17'	Report	Salpingidis 51'

National Stadium, Warsaw
Attendance: 56,070
Referee: Carlos Velasco Carballo (Spain)

Poland	Greece

GK	1	Wojciech Szczęsny	(red card) 68'
RB	20	Łukasz Piszczek
CB	13	Marcin Wasilewski
CB	15	Damien Perquis
LB	2	Sebastian Boenisch
CM	11	Rafał Murawski
CM	7	Eugen Polanski
RW	16	Jakub Błaszczykowski (c)
AM	10	Ludovic Obraniak
LW	8	Maciej Rybus		(substituted off) 70'
CF	9	Robert Lewandowski
Substitutions:
GK	22	Przemysław Tytoń		(substituted on) 70'
Manager:
Franciszek Smuda

GK	1	Kostas Chalkias
RB	15	Vasilis Torosidis
CB	19	Sokratis Papastathopoulos	(yellow card) 35' (yellow-red card) 44'
CB	8	Avraam Papadopoulos		(substituted off) 37'
LB	20	José Holebas	(yellow card) 45+2'
RM	2	Ioannis Maniatis
CM	21	Kostas Katsouranis
LM	10	Giorgos Karagounis (c)	(yellow card) 54'
RF	18	Sotiris Ninis		(substituted off) 46'
CF	17	Theofanis Gekas		(substituted off) 68'
LF	7	Georgios Samaras
Substitutions:
DF	5	Kyriakos Papadopoulos		(substituted on) 37'
FW	14	Dimitris Salpingidis		(substituted on) 46'
MF	22	Kostas Fortounis		(substituted on) 68'
Manager:
(Portugal) Fernando Santos

Man of the Match:
Robert Lewandowski (Poland)

Assistant referees:
Roberto Alonso Fernández (Spain)
Juan Carlos Yuste Jiménez (Spain)
Fourth official:
Gianluca Rocchi (Italy)
Additional assistant referees:
David Fernández Borbalán (Spain)
Carlos Clos Gómez (Spain)
Reserve assistant referee:
Renato Faverani (Italy)

=== Russia vs Czech Republic ===
8 June 2012
20:45

Russia	4–1	Czech Republic
Dzagoev 15', 79'; Shirokov 24'; Pavlyuchenko 82'	Report	Pilař 52'

Stadion Miejski, Wrocław
Attendance: 40,803
Referee: Howard Webb (England)

Russia	Czech Republic

GK	16	Vyacheslav Malafeev
RB	2	Aleksandr Anyukov
CB	12	Aleksei Berezutski
CB	4	Sergei Ignashevich
LB	5	Yuri Zhirkov
RM	6	Roman Shirokov
CM	7	Igor Denisov
LM	8	Konstantin Zyryanov
RF	17	Alan Dzagoev	(substituted off) 84'
CF	11	Aleksandr Kerzhakov	(substituted off) 73'
LF	10	Andrei Arshavin (c)
Substitutions:
FW	14	Roman Pavlyuchenko	(substituted on) 73'
FW	18	Aleksandr Kokorin	(substituted on) 84'
Manager:
(Netherlands) Dick Advocaat

GK	1	Petr Čech
RB	2	Theodor Gebre Selassie
CB	5	Roman Hubník
CB	6	Tomáš Sivok
LB	3	Michal Kadlec
CM	13	Jaroslav Plašil
CM	19	Petr Jiráček	(substituted off) 76'
RW	14	Václav Pilař
AM	10	Tomáš Rosický (c)
LW	9	Jan Rezek	(substituted off) 46'
CF	15	Milan Baroš	(substituted off) 85'
Substitutions:
MF	17	Tomáš Hübschman	(substituted on) 46'
MF	11	Milan Petržela	(substituted on) 76'
FW	21	David Lafata	(substituted on) 85'
Manager:
Michal Bílek

Man of the Match:
Alan Dzagoev (Russia)

Assistant referees:
Michael Mullarkey (England)
Peter Kirkup (England)
Fourth official:
Jorge Sousa (Portugal)
Additional assistant referees:
Martin Atkinson (England)
Mark Clattenburg (England)
Reserve assistant referee:
Bertino Miranda (Portugal)

=== Greece vs Czech Republic ===
12 June 2012
18:00

Greece	1–2	Czech Republic
Gekas 53'	Report	Jiráček 3'; Pilař 6'

Stadion Miejski, Wrocław
Attendance: 41,105
Referee: Stéphane Lannoy (France)

Greece	Czech Republic

GK	1	Kostas Chalkias		(substituted off) 23'
RB	15	Vasilis Torosidis	(yellow card) 34'
CB	5	Kyriakos Papadopoulos	(yellow card) 56'
CB	21	Kostas Katsouranis
LB	20	José Holebas
RM	16	Georgios Fotakis		(substituted off) 46'
CM	2	Ioannis Maniatis
LM	10	Giorgos Karagounis (c)
RF	14	Dimitris Salpingidis	(yellow card) 57'
CF	7	Georgios Samaras
LF	22	Kostas Fortounis		(substituted off) 71'
Substitutions:
GK	13	Michalis Sifakis		(substituted on) 23'
FW	17	Theofanis Gekas		(substituted on) 46'
FW	11	Kostas Mitroglou		(substituted on) 71'
Manager:
(Portugal) Fernando Santos

GK	1	Petr Čech
RB	2	Theodor Gebre Selassie
CB	6	Tomáš Sivok
CB	3	Michal Kadlec
LB	8	David Limberský
CM	17	Tomáš Hübschman
CM	13	Jaroslav Plašil
RW	19	Petr Jiráček	(yellow card) 36'
AM	10	Tomáš Rosický (c)	(yellow card) 27'	(substituted off) 46'
LW	14	Václav Pilař
CF	15	Milan Baroš		(substituted off) 64'
Substitutions:
MF	18	Daniel Kolář	(yellow card) 65'	(substituted on) 46'	(substituted off) 90'
FW	20	Tomáš Pekhart		(substituted on) 64'
DF	12	František Rajtoral			(substituted on) 90'
Manager:
Michal Bílek

Man of the Match:
Václav Pilař (Czech Republic)

Assistant referees:
Frédéric Cano (France)
Michaël Annonier (France)
Fourth official:
Matej Jug (Slovenia)
Additional assistant referees:
Fredy Fautrel (France)
Ruddy Buquet (France)
Reserve assistant referee:
Primož Arhar (Slovenia)

=== Poland vs Russia ===
12 June 2012
20:45

Poland	1–1	Russia
Błaszczykowski 57'	Report	Dzagoev 37'

National Stadium, Warsaw
Attendance: 55,920
Referee: Wolfgang Stark (Germany)

Poland	Russia

GK	22	Przemysław Tytoń
RB	20	Łukasz Piszczek
CB	13	Marcin Wasilewski
CB	15	Damien Perquis
LB	2	Sebastian Boenisch
CM	5	Dariusz Dudka		(substituted off) 73'
CM	7	Eugen Polanski	(yellow card) 79'	(substituted off) 85'
RW	16	Jakub Błaszczykowski (c)
AM	11	Rafał Murawski
LW	10	Ludovic Obraniak		(substituted off) 90+3'
CF	9	Robert Lewandowski	(yellow card) 60'
Substitutions:
MF	18	Adrian Mierzejewski		(substituted on) 73'
MF	6	Adam Matuszczyk		(substituted on) 85'
FW	23	Paweł Brożek		(substituted on) 90+3'
Manager:
Franciszek Smuda

GK	16	Vyacheslav Malafeev
RB	2	Aleksandr Anyukov
CB	12	Aleksei Berezutski
CB	4	Sergei Ignashevich
LB	5	Yuri Zhirkov
RM	6	Roman Shirokov
CM	7	Igor Denisov	(yellow card) 60'
LM	8	Konstantin Zyryanov
RF	17	Alan Dzagoev	(yellow card) 75'	(substituted off) 79'
CF	11	Aleksandr Kerzhakov		(substituted off) 70'
LF	10	Andrei Arshavin (c)
Substitutions:
FW	14	Roman Pavlyuchenko		(substituted on) 70'
MF	9	Marat Izmailov		(substituted on) 79'
Manager:
(Netherlands) Dick Advocaat

Man of the Match:
Jakub Błaszczykowski (Poland)

Assistant referees:
Jan-Hendrik Salver (Germany)
Mike Pickel (Germany)
Fourth official:
István Vad (Hungary)
Additional assistant referees:
Florian Meyer (Germany)
Deniz Aytekin (Germany)
Reserve assistant referee:
Gábor Erős (Hungary)

=== Czech Republic vs Poland ===
16 June 2012
20:45

Czech Republic	1–0	Poland
Jiráček 72'	Report

Stadion Miejski, Wrocław
Attendance: 41,480
Referee: Craig Thomson (Scotland)

Czech Republic	Poland

GK	1	Petr Čech (c)
RB	2	Theodor Gebre Selassie
CB	6	Tomáš Sivok
CB	3	Michal Kadlec
LB	8	David Limberský	(yellow card) 12'
CM	17	Tomáš Hübschman
CM	13	Jaroslav Plašil	(yellow card) 87'
RW	19	Petr Jiráček		(substituted off) 84'
AM	18	Daniel Kolář
LW	14	Václav Pilař		(substituted off) 88'
CF	15	Milan Baroš		(substituted off) 90+1'
Substitutions:
DF	12	František Rajtoral		(substituted on) 84'
FW	9	Jan Rezek		(substituted on) 88'
FW	20	Tomáš Pekhart	(yellow card) 90+4'	(substituted on) 90+1'
Manager:
Michal Bílek

GK	22	Przemysław Tytoń
RB	20	Łukasz Piszczek
CB	13	Marcin Wasilewski	(yellow card) 61'
CB	15	Damien Perquis	(yellow card) 90'
LB	2	Sebastian Boenisch
CM	5	Dariusz Dudka
CM	7	Eugen Polanski	(yellow card) 48'	(substituted off) 56'
RW	16	Jakub Błaszczykowski (c)	(yellow card) 87'
AM	11	Rafał Murawski	(yellow card) 22'	(substituted off) 73'
LW	10	Ludovic Obraniak		(substituted off) 73'
CF	9	Robert Lewandowski
Substitutions:
MF	21	Kamil Grosicki		(substituted on) 56'
FW	23	Paweł Brożek		(substituted on) 73'
MF	18	Adrian Mierzejewski		(substituted on) 73'
Manager:
Franciszek Smuda

Man of the Match:
Petr Jiráček (Czech Republic)

Assistant referees:
Alasdair Ross (Scotland)
Derek Rose (Scotland)
Fourth official:
Fredy Fautrel (France)
Additional assistant referees:
William Collum (Scotland)
Euan Norris (Scotland)
Reserve assistant referee:
Frédéric Cano (France)

=== Greece vs Russia ===
16 June 2012
20:45

Greece	1–0	Russia
Karagounis 45+2'	Report

National Stadium, Warsaw
Attendance: 55,614
Referee: Jonas Eriksson (Sweden)

Greece	Russia

GK	13	Michalis Sifakis
RB	15	Vasilis Torosidis
CB	19	Sokratis Papastathopoulos
CB	5	Kyriakos Papadopoulos
LB	3	Georgios Tzavelas
CM	21	Kostas Katsouranis
CM	2	Ioannis Maniatis
RW	14	Dimitris Salpingidis		(substituted off) 83'
AM	10	Giorgos Karagounis (c)	(yellow card) 61'	(substituted off) 67'
LW	7	Georgios Samaras
CF	17	Theofanis Gekas		(substituted off) 64'
Substitutions:
MF	20	José Holebas	(yellow card) 90+4'	(substituted on) 64'
MF	6	Grigoris Makos		(substituted on) 67'
MF	18	Sotiris Ninis		(substituted on) 83'
Manager:
(Portugal) Fernando Santos

GK	16	Vyacheslav Malafeev
RB	2	Aleksandr Anyukov	(yellow card) 61'	(substituted off) 81'
CB	12	Aleksei Berezutski
CB	4	Sergei Ignashevich
LB	5	Yuri Zhirkov	(yellow card) 69'
RM	6	Roman Shirokov
CM	7	Igor Denisov
LM	22	Denis Glushakov		(substituted off) 72'
RF	17	Alan Dzagoev	(yellow card) 70'
CF	11	Aleksandr Kerzhakov		(substituted off) 46'
LF	10	Andrei Arshavin (c)
Substitutions:
FW	14	Roman Pavlyuchenko		(substituted on) 46'
FW	20	Pavel Pogrebnyak	(yellow card) 90+3'	(substituted on) 72'
MF	9	Marat Izmailov		(substituted on) 81'
Manager:
(Netherlands) Dick Advocaat

Man of the Match:
Giorgos Karagounis (Greece)

Assistant referees:
Stefan Wittberg (Sweden)
Mathias Klasenius (Sweden)
Fourth official:
Hüseyin Göçek (Turkey)
Additional assistant referees:
Markus Strömbergsson (Sweden)
Stefan Johannesson (Sweden)
Reserve assistant referee:
Bahattin Duran (Turkey)

== See also ==
- Czech Republic at the UEFA European Championship
- Greece at the UEFA European Championship
- Poland at the UEFA European Championship
- Russia at the UEFA European Championship
