= Kyriakos Papadopoulos =

Greek footballer (born 1992)

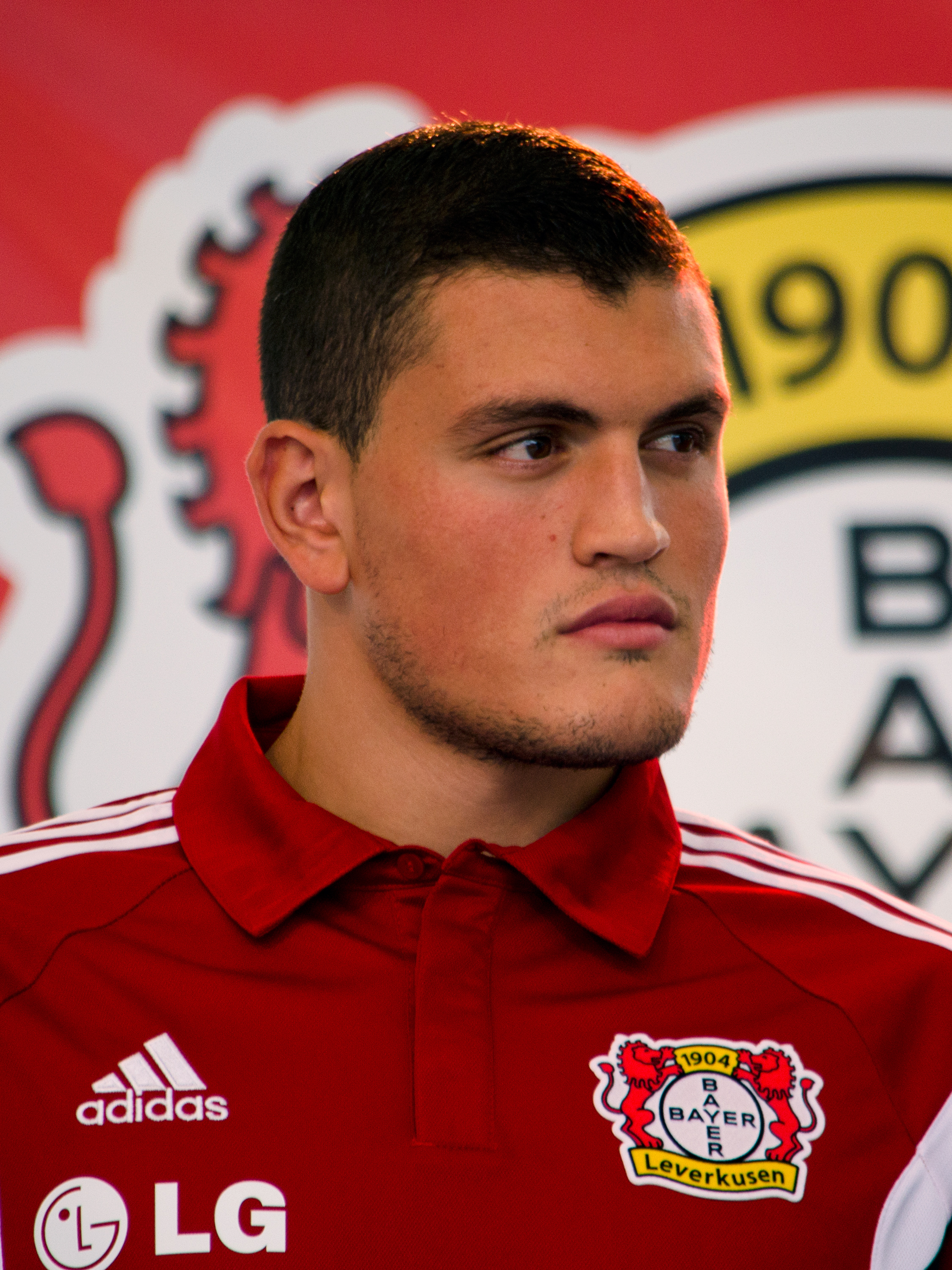
- Papadopoulos with Leverkusen in 2014.

Personal information
- Date of birth: 23 February 1992 (age 34)
- Place of birth: Katerini, Greece
- Height: 1.83 m (6 ft 0 in)
- Position: Centre-back

Team information
- Current team: Svoronos Katerinis

Youth career
- 2000–2007: Svoronos Katerinis
- 2007–2010: Olympiacos

Senior career*
Years	Team	Apps	(Gls)
2007–2010	Olympiacos	13	(1)
2010–2015	Schalke 04	61	(3)
2014–2015	→ Bayer Leverkusen (loan)	14	(2)
2015–2017	Bayer Leverkusen	16	(0)
2016–2017	→ RB Leipzig (loan)	1	(0)
2017	→ Hamburger SV (loan)	15	(2)
2017–2020	Hamburger SV	32	(1)
2020–2021	Lokomotiva	24	(2)
2021	Al-Fayha	1	(0)
2021–2022	Atromitos	15	(0)
2022–2023	FC U Craiova	9	(0)
2023–2024	Lamia	31	(0)
2024	Levadiakos	8	(0)
2025–	Svoronos Katerini	0	(0)

International career^{‡}
2008–2009	Greece U17	6	(1)
2008–2010	Greece U19	17	(1)
2008–2011	Greece U21	15	(2)
2011–2021	Greece	35	(4)
- * Club domestic league appearances and goals as of 20 October 2024 ‡ National team caps and goals as of 5 September 2021

Kyriakos Papadopoulos (Greek: Κυριάκος Παπαδόπουλος; born 23 February 1992) is a Greek professional footballer who plays as a centre-back for Svoronos Katerini.

Having made his first league appearances for Olympiacos at the age of 15, Papadopoulos moved to Germany in 2010 to join Schalke 04 and scored on his senior debut for Greece the following year, aged 19. However, his career progress in the Bundesliga was hampered by a succession of injuries over several seasons.

== Club career ==
=== Olympiacos ===
Born in Katerini, Papadopoulos was playing for hometown club Svoronos Katerinis in July 2007, when he was invited on trial to train with the Espanyol youth team during pre-season, with a view to giving the player a role in the youth team. Papadopoulos, however, performed well enough for the club's management staff to fast-track him to the reserve team, offering him a contract immediately.

Olympiacos scouts were also aware of the prodigy's talents, however, and the former manager of Olympiacos, George Louvaris, was quick to secure a deal with Papadopoulos' father Nikos, thus bringing him to Piraeus. He immediately featured in several of Olympiacos' pre-season friendlies, three league games and three Greek Cup games.

The 2007–08 season was promising for Papadopoulos. He made his competitive debut for Olympiacos in the Greek Super League as a substitute during a 3–1 win over Atromitos on 2 December 2007, thus becoming the youngest player to ever play in the Greek league at the age of 15 years and 283 days. He also made the substitutes bench in the UEFA Champions League against Real Madrid and Lazio, and featured in several Greek Cup games. If Papadopoulos had featured in any Champions League games, he would have broken the record for the youngest player to ever compete in the competition by nearly two years.

In September 2008, Papadopoulos signed a new contract with Olympiacos, which included a £4.6 million release clause, over three years. On 2 November 2008, he made his first league appearance of the 2008–09 season for Olympiacos at home to Ergotelis in a 2–0 home win.

=== Schalke 04 ===
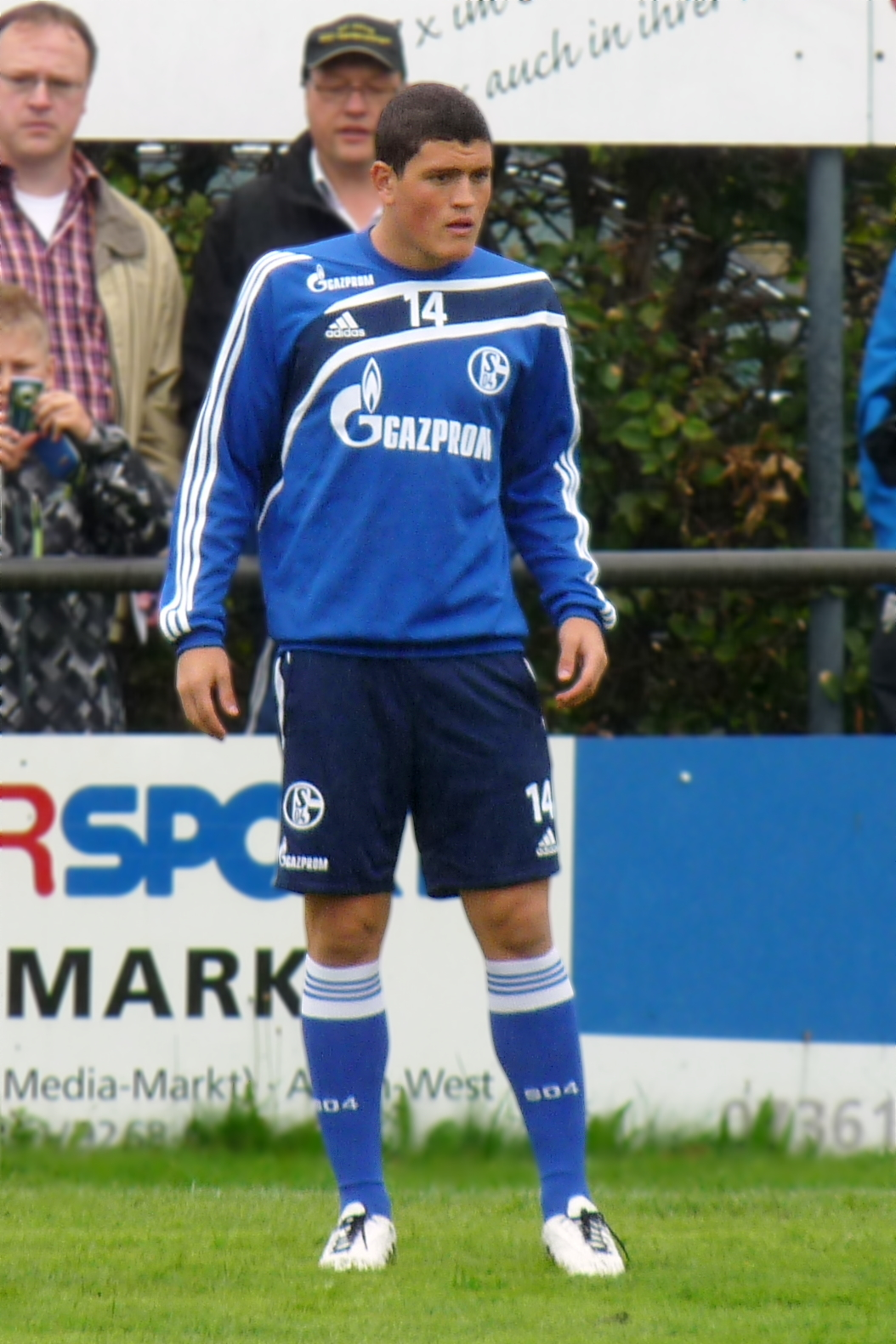
Papadopoulos training at Schalke 04 in 2010.

On 23 June 2010, German club Schalke 04 announced that they had signed Papadopoulos on a four-year deal, keeping him until 2014. On 21 August 2010, Papadopoulos made his Bundesliga debut for the club in a 2–1 loss against Hamburger SV. On 25 August 2011, in the qualification round of the UEFA Europa League, he scored his first goal for Schalke in a 6–1 win over HJK Helsinki. On 1 December, in a group stage game in the Europa League, Papadopoulos scored the opening goal in a 2–1 win over Steaua București. On 17 December, Papadopoulos scored his first goal in the Bundesliga in a 5–0 win over Werder Bremen and scored the next game on 21 January 2012 in a 3–1 win over VfB Stuttgart. Since joining Schalke from Olympiacos, Papadopoulos has played in over 70 matches in all competitions, scoring five goals and has ultimately gathered respect and praise from all over Europe due to his tenacious and skillful defending considering his young age.

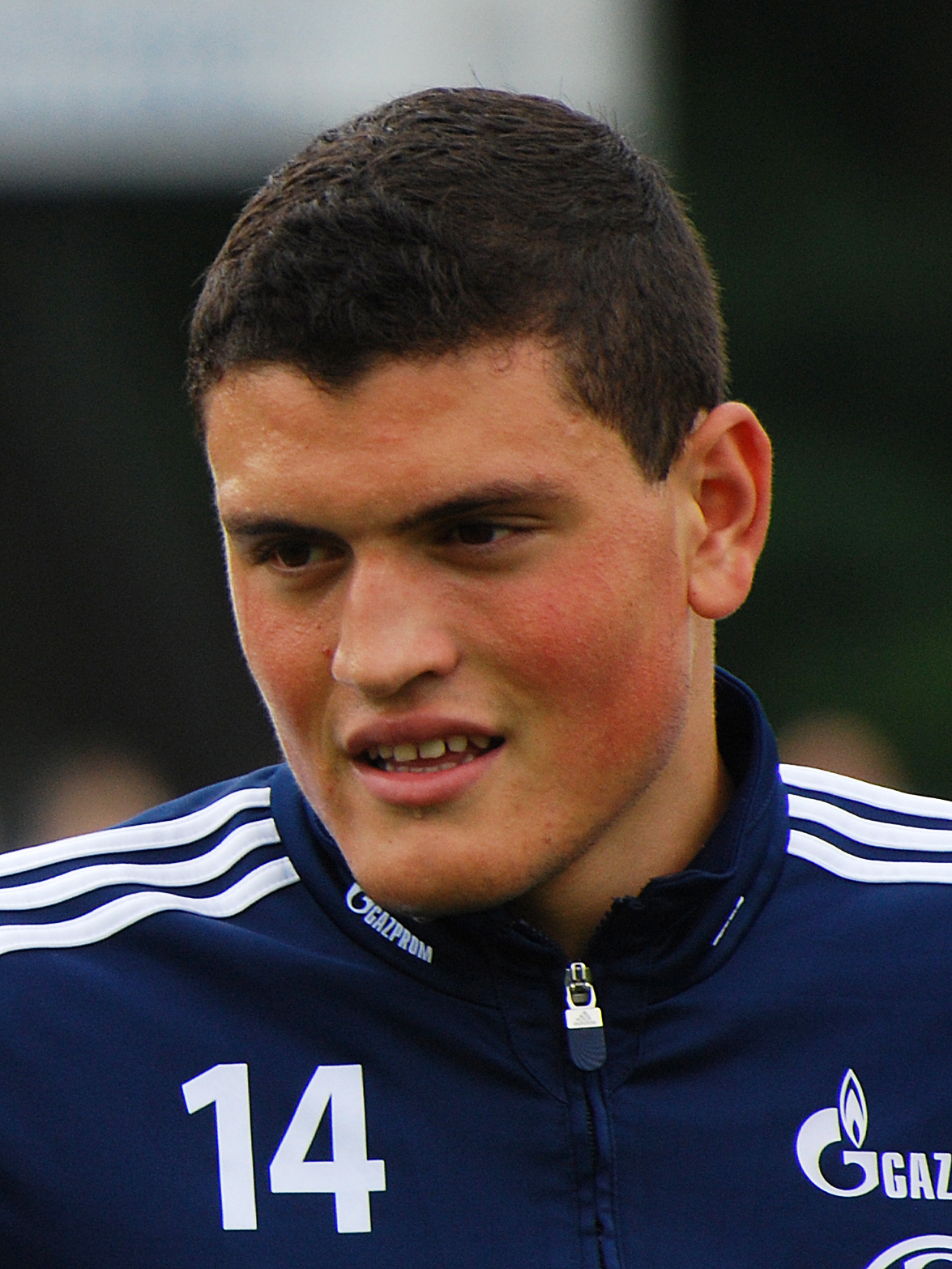
Papadopoulos with Schalke 04 in 2011.

Ahead of the 2012–13 season, Italian club Milan were interested in signing Papadopoulos. After showing interest, Schalke accused Milan of making an illegal approach for Papadopoulos without the club knowing. Also interested were Russian giants Zenit Saint Petersburg, but when their £16 million bid for Papadopoulos was accepted by Schalke, Papadopoulos rejected the move, opting to stay in Germany. In September 2012, Papadopoulos signed a new contract with Schalke that will keep him at the club until 2016. On matchday two of the 2012–13 season, Papadopoulos scored his first goal of the season, and third in the Bundesliga, in a 3–1 win over FC Augsburg. A virus, however, would later kept him out of play for a number of games, and he would later undergo surgery in an attempt to correct a knee injury he suffered in a 3–1 loss away at Hamburger SV in November 2012.

After a very difficult year for the defender marred by injury (383 days to be exact), Papadopoulos returned to action in a home game against SC Freiburg in December 2013. Just a few weeks after his return to action, however, Papadopoulos suffered a new shoulder injury and could have been forced to undergo surgery. The news came as another blow, as his recurring knee problems restricted him to just four appearances in the 2013–14 season. The injury also forced him to miss the 2014 World Cup with Greece.

==== Loan to Bayer Leverkusen ====
On 3 August 2014, Bayer Leverkusen signed Papadopoulos on a season-long loan deal. He told Leverkusen's official website: "I am very happy that it worked out with the change. Bayer 04 is a club just like Schalke with major international ambitions. Unfortunately I was injured more often in the past season. But now I'm back fit and highly motivated to achieve with Leverkusen both my personal goals as well as the club's."

On 3 November 2014, Leverkusen announced that Papadopoulos had been ruled out for the remainder of 2014 with a shoulder injury. The centre-back suffered the injury in the final training session ahead of his side's UEFA Champions League away match with Zenit Saint Petersburg; he underwent surgery. "That's just bitter for Papa," Leverkusen coach Roger Schmidt told reporters ahead of Leverkusen's trip to Russia. Following his injury, the club announced that Papadopoulos underwent successful surgery on the following Monday in Herne.

On 8 March 2015, Papadopoulos scored his first Bundesliga goal for Bayer Leverkusen against SC Paderborn. His injury misery continued on 25 April 2015, after he dislocated his right shoulder in a league match away against 1. FC Köln. Leverkusen officials reported that Papadopoulos would return to the training after three months.

=== Bayer Leverkusen ===
On 7 June 2015, Bayer Leverkusen opted to make Papadopoulos' loan from Schalke 04 permanent on a €6.5 million transfer fee, with the player signing a five-year contract. On 29 September 2015, Papadopoulos scored his first goal in the 2015–16 season in the first half of a Champions League encounter against Barcelona: Hakan Çalhanoğlu, swung in a corner that hit right underneath Barça goalkeeper Marc-André ter Stegen's crossbar; Papadopoulos headed in the rebound from close range. Papadopoulos suffered a lot of injuries during the season facing a tear in a joint capsule that kept him two weeks out of training, as well as a right calf tendon in the 0–0 Europa League draw with Villarreal that kept him out of the club until the end of the season.

==== Loan to RB Leipzig ====
On 31 August 2016, Papadopoulos joined RB Leipzig on a €1.5 million season-long loan deal, linking up once again with Leipzig's director of sport Ralf Rangnick, who was his coach when they won the DFB Pokal together with Schalke in 2011. On 21 September 2016, he made his debut with the club as a substitute in a 1–1 Bundesliga match against Borussia Mönchengladbach. On 24 November 2016, Papadopoulos underwent a successful routine surgery to overcome a chronic knee problem. and started a rehabilitation program, with his return to action estimated at three weeks.

=== Hamburger SV ===
On 13 January 2017, after a frustrating first half of the campaign with RB Leipzig and due to their acquisition of defender Dayot Upamecano from Salzburg during the winter transfer window, Papadopoulos moved to Hamburger SV. The HSV manager Markus Gisdol knew the defender from their time together at Schalke 04. On 21 January 2017, he made his debut with the club as a starter in a 1–0 away loss to VfL Wolfsburg. On 3 February 2017, Papadopoulos scored a headed goal from a set piece against Bayer Leverkusen, giving Hamburg a 1–0 victory over his parent club. A week later, HSV celebrated back-to-back Bundesliga wins for the sole second time this season as Papadopoulos scored against his last club in a 3–0 away win at RB Leipzig.

On 18 February 2017, in his fourth Bundesliga game with Hamburg, he was substituted in the first half due to a shoulder injury. On 1 March 2017, Papadopoulos returned in the DFB Cup against Borussia Mönchengladbach. On 18 March 2017, in a 0–0 away draw against Eintracht Frankfurt, he reached 100 appearances in the Bundesliga wearing the jersey of four clubs.

On 21 June 2017, having narrowly avoided relegation the previous season, Hamburger SV signed Papadopoulos on a permanent three-year deal from Bayer Leverkusen on a €6.5 million transfer fee, with the Dinosaurs to offer another €3 million in the form of a target bonus, for the next three years. On 9 August 2017, despite having been with the club for only six months, he was named vice-captain for the 2017–18 season. On 12 December 2017, he scored his first goal for the season in a 2–1 home loss against Eintracht Frankfurt.

On 23 July 2018, according to the Hamburger Morgenpost, Papadopoulos was suffering from a knee cartilage injury which required immediate surgical treatment. The rehabilitation period was estimated at six months, meaning he would be able to compete again around Christmas, missing at least the first half of the 2018–19 2. Bundesliga season. On 30 March 2019, he returned to the squad as a substitute in the bench, in an away 0–0 game against VfL Bochum after a difficult recovery process (154 days to be exact) from his cartilage damage and three days later he made his debut with the first team as a starter in a 2–0 away win DFB Pokal game against Paderborn.

=== Lokomotiva ===
On 27 October 2020, the Croatian football club based in Zagreb Lokomotiva officially announced the signing of Greek international for an undisclosed fee.

=== Al-Fayha ===
On 18 July 2021, he moved to Saudi Professional League side Al-Fayha, on a free transfer from NK Lokomotiva, for a two-years' contract for an undisclosed fee, increasing the parish of the Greeks in the club after the signing of Panagiotis Tachtsidis. On 28 August 2021, Kyriakos Papadopoulos is looking for the next club of his career, as he is solved his contract with Al-Fayha, after a month of his presence in Saudi Arabia. The 29-year-old defender recorded just one participation, and that was for only 16 minutes.

=== Atromitos ===
On 9 September 2021, Papadopoulos returned to Super League Greece, by signing a season-long contract with Atromitos for an undisclosed fee.

=== U Craiova ===
On 23 July 2022, Papadopoulos joined U Craiova a Romanian professional football club based in Craiova, Dolj County, which competes in the Liga I on a two years contract for an undisclosed fee. On 21 January 2023, he mutually solved his contract with the club, as his last official game was in October 2022.

=== Lamia ===
On 15 February 2023, Papadopoulos returned to Super League Greece, by signing a season-long contract with Lamia for an undisclosed fee.

== International career ==
Papadopoulos was called up to the under-19 Greece national team for the Elite round of the 2007 UEFA European Under-19 Football Championship. He appeared in all three group games against Moldova, Netherlands and Russia, helping Greece finish top and qualify for the finals. Papadopoulos later featured at the heart of the Greek defence in the finals tournament and was partners with teammate Konstantinos Lambropoulos. He was instrumental in keeping a clean sheet against the Czech Republic, as well as strong performances against England and Italy. His performances attracted attention from scouts of elite teams such as Manchester United, Arsenal and Chelsea.

He was the youngest player in the tournament by 13 months and the teams were impressed with the defender's maturity while in a competition. Also, he was one of the ten most talented players in Europe as considered by UEFA in their UEFA Under-19 Team of the Tournament.

He finished an excellent season with Schalke when, on 4 June 2011, the then-Greece head coach, Fernando Santos, called up Papadopoulos for a rookie spot on the team for a match against Malta. Due to an injured Avraam Papadopoulos and Sokratis Papastathopoulos being unable play, he took their place in the squad in the centre of defence next to Vangelis Moras. Papadopoulos had an excellent game that included he scoring the team's second match goal. On 6 September 2011, he scored his second international goal against Latvia in UEFA Euro 2012 qualification.

Papadopoulos was part of the Greece Under-23 squad for the finals of the UEFA Euro 2012. He was a starter in the team's second and third group games and the quarter-final match loss to Germany.

On 17 April 2015, Papadopoulos was recalled by new Greece manager Sergio Markarián, as part of a selection overhaul, to participate in the nation's European Championship qualifier away at Hungary.

For the World Cup 2018 qualifying campaign, Papadopoulos was selected by the German-born coach Michael Skibbe. Against Cyprus, he came on as substitute of Kostas Stafylidis after 71 min. He played the entire third match against Estonia, but was sent off after 79 minutes during the clash against Bosnia-Herzegovina. Papadopoulos was then required to miss the important fifth game against the Belgian Red Devils.

== Career statistics ==
=== Club ===
As of 4 February 2024

Appearances and goals by club, season and competition
Club	Season	League			Cup (Note: Includes appearances in the Greek Cup, DFB-Pokal, Croatian Football Cup and Cupa României.)		Europe (Note: Includes appearances in the UEFA Champions League and UEFA Europa League.)		Other (Note: Includes appearances in the Super League Greece play-offs and DFL-Supercup.)		Total	
Club	Season	Division	Apps	Goals	Apps	Goals	Apps	Goals	Apps	Goals	Apps	Goals
Olympiacos	2007–08	Super League Greece	3	0	3	0	0	0	–		6	0
Olympiacos	2008–09	Super League Greece	3	0	0	0	1	0	–		4	0
Olympiacos	2009–10	Super League Greece	7	1	1	0	2	0	2	0	12	1
Olympiacos	Total		13	1	4	0	3	0	2	0	22	1
Schalke 04	2010–11	Bundesliga	18	0	5	0	7	0	0	0	30	0
Schalke 04	2011–12	Bundesliga	29	2	3	1	13	2	1	0	46	5
Schalke 04	2012–13	Bundesliga	10	1	2	1	4	0	–		16	2
Schalke 04	2013–14	Bundesliga	4	0	0	0	1	0	–		5	0
Schalke 04	Total		61	3	10	2	25	2	1	0	97	7
Bayer Leverkusen (loan)	2014–15	Bundesliga	14	2	2	1	4	1	–		20	4
Bayer Leverkusen	2015–16	Bundesliga	16	0	4	0	11	1	–		31	1
Bayer Leverkusen	Total		30	2	6	1	15	2	0	0	51	5
RB Leipzig (loan)	2016–17	Bundesliga	1	0	0	0	–		–		1	0
Hamburger SV (loan)	2016–17	Bundesliga	15	2	2	0	–		–		17	2
Hamburger SV	2017–18	Bundesliga	29	1	1	0	–		–		30	1
Hamburger SV	2018–19	2. Bundesliga	1	0	1	0	–		–		2	0
Hamburger SV	2019–20	2. Bundesliga	2	0	0	0	–		–		2	0
Hamburger SV	Total		32	1	2	0	–		–		34	1
Lokomotiva Zagreb	2020–21	Prva HNL	24	2	0	0	–		–		24	2
Al-Fayha	2021–22	Saudi Pro League	1	0	0	0	–		–		1	0
Atromitos	2021–22	Super League Greece	15	0	1	0	–		–		16	0
U Craiova	2022–23	Liga I	9	0	0	0	–		–		9	0
Lamia	2022–23	Super League Greece	10	0	0	0	–		–		10	0
Lamia	2023–24	Super League Greece	14	0	0	0	–		–		14	0
Lamia	Total		24	0	0	0	–		–		24	0
Career total			225	11	25	3	43	4	3	0	296	18

=== International ===
Appearances and goals by national team and year
National team	Year	Apps	Goals
Greece	2011	6	2
Greece	2012	10	2
Greece	2013	0	0
Greece	2014	0	0
Greece	2015	4	0
Greece	2016	4	0
Greece	2017	3	0
Greece	2018	1	0
Greece	2019	0	0
Greece	2020	0	0
Greece	2021	6	0
Total		35	4

Scores and results list Greece's goal tally first, score column indicates score after each Papadopoulos goal.

List of international goals scored by Kyriakos Papadopoulos
No.	Date	Venue	Opponent	Score	Result	Competition
1	4 June 2011	Karaiskakis Stadium, Piraeus, Greece	Malta	2–0	3–1	UEFA Euro 2012 qualifying
2	6 September 2011	Skonto Stadium, Riga, Latvia	Latvia	1–1	1–1	UEFA Euro 2012 qualifying
3	31 May 2012	Kufstein Arena, Kufstein, Austria	Armenia	1–0	1–0	Friendly
4	15 August 2012	Ullevaal Stadion, Oslo Norway	Norway	2–0	3–2	Friendly

== Honours ==
Olympiacos

- Super League Greece: 2007–08, 2008–09
- Greek Cup: 2007–08, 2008–09
- Greek Super Cup: 2007

Schalke 04

- DFB-Pokal: 2010–11
- DFL-Supercup: 2011
