= Wrocław Stadium =

Stadium in Poland

- Stadion Wrocław

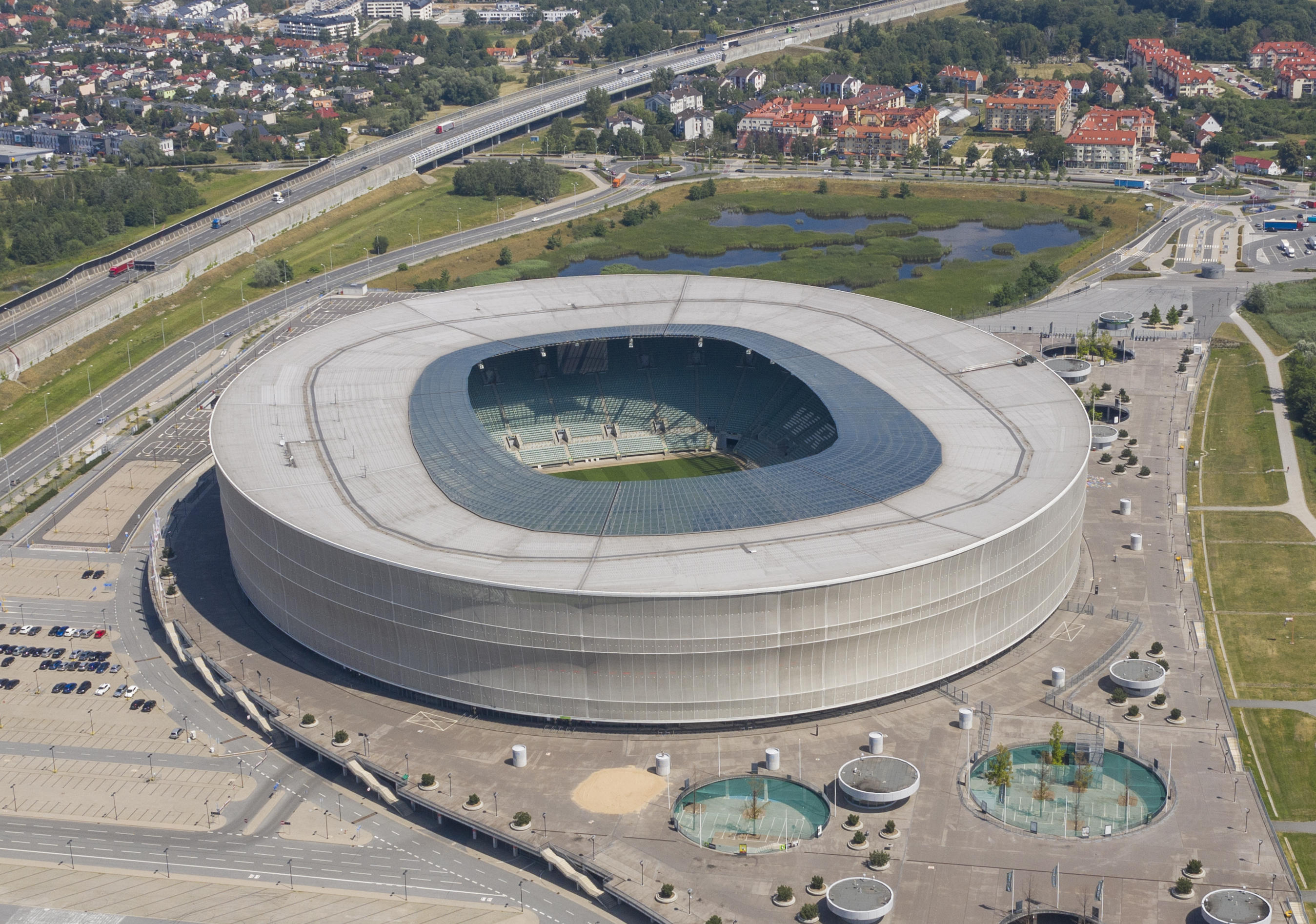
- UEFA
- Interactive map of Wrocław Stadium
- Full name: Tarczyński Arena Wrocław
- Location: Aleja Śląska 1; 54-128 Wrocław, Poland
- Coordinates: 51°08′28″N 16°56′38″E
- Owner: City of Wrocław
- Operator: SMG
- Capacity: 42,771
- Surface: Grass
- Record attendance: 42,771; Śląsk 1–0 Lechia (28 October 2011)
- Field size: 105 x 68 meters

Construction
- Groundbreaking: 2009
- Built: 2009–2011
- Opened: 10 September 2011
- Cost: 729,7 mln PLN
- Architect: JSK Architekci

Tenants
- Śląsk Wrocław (2011–present); Poland national football team (selected matches); Panthers Wrocław (selected games)

Website
- Official Website

The Wrocław Stadium (Polish: Stadion Wrocław), known for sponsorship reasons as Tarczyński Arena Wrocław since 2021, is a UEFA Category Four association football stadium built for the 2012 UEFA European Football Championship. The Stadium is located on aleja Śląska (English: Silesian Avenue) in the district of Fabryczna, Wrocław. It is the home stadium of the Śląsk Wrocław football team playing in the Polish Ekstraklasa. The stadium has a capacity of 42,771 spectators, all seated and all covered.

Wrocław Stadium is the largest arena in the Polish top-tier and the third largest in the country, after the Kazimierz Górski National Stadium in Warsaw and the Silesian Stadium in Chorzów.

Stadium construction began in April 2009 and was completed in September 2011.

Stadium opening took place at 10 September 2011 with the first sporting event being a boxing fight, between Tomasz Adamek and Vitali Klitschko for the WBC heavyweight title, which is also considered as the first Heavyweight title fight held in Poland. The first football match, between Śląsk Wrocław and Lechia Gdańsk, was played on 28 October 2011. Śląsk won the match 1–0 and Johan Voskamp was the first goalscorer at the new stadium.

== Stadium Concept ==
=== Overall, esplanade & roof ===
The winning architectural concept developed by JSK Architekci is called STADIUM-LANTERN. The distinctive shape was chosen to be easily recognizable and associated with a dynamic city.

The shape of the stadium is highlighted by the innovative design of its external walls. The building is covered by glass fibre mesh coated with teflon. The mesh is anchored by steel rings placed around the entire body of the stadium. The covering lends lightness and transparency to the massive structure. The colors of the external walls of the stadium can be changed using a sophisticated lighting system.

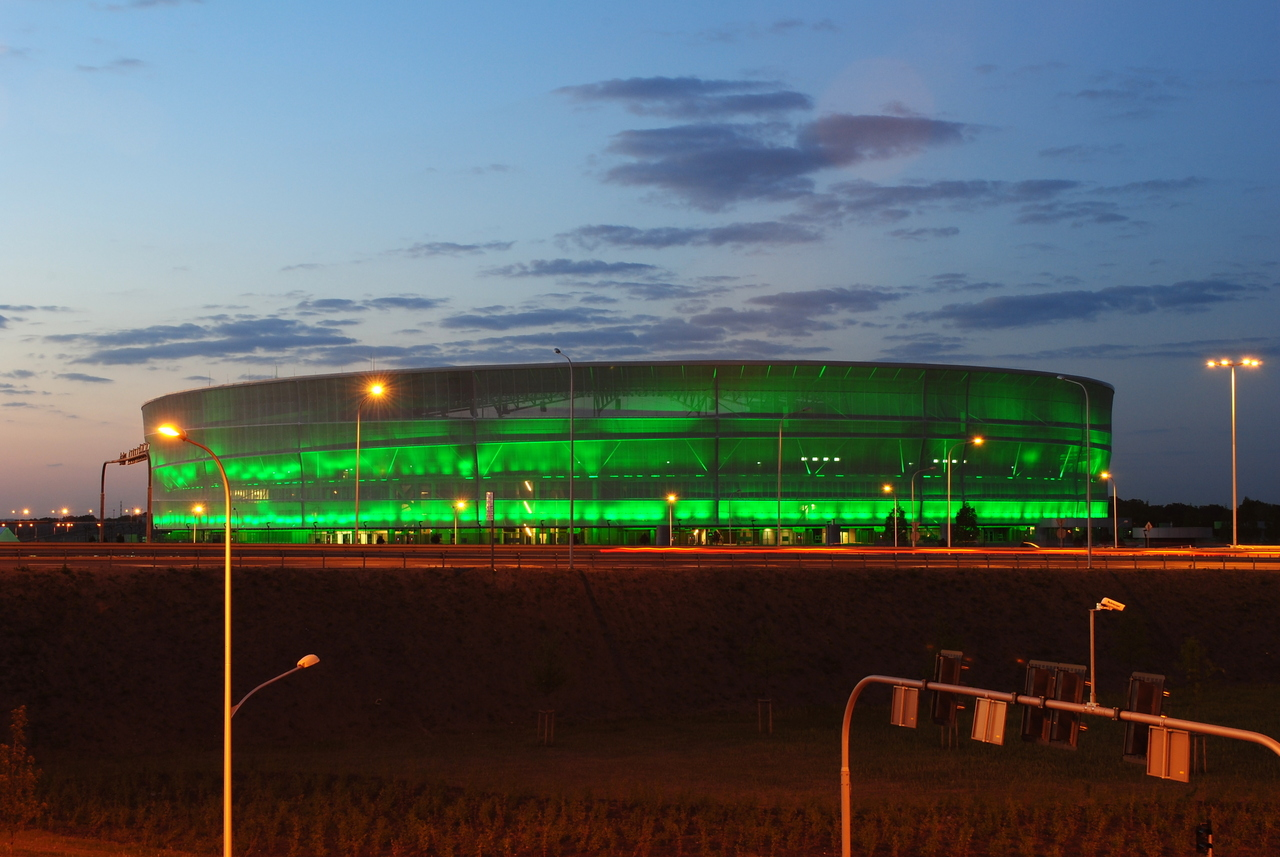
Stadium during lighting system testing

The architectural concept also includes an outdoor promenade around the stadium, called the esplanade with a total area of 52 753 m^{2}. The esplanade grants access to the inside of the stadium from two directions. From the south, it leads under Lotnicza Street where an integrated Park & Ride plaza is being built with a tram stop, a train station, and an outdoor parking lot. From the north, the esplanade leads from the northern public transport interchange with tram and bus stops and a parking lot for buses.

The area surrounding the stadium and esplanade is landscaped and provided with benches to create a park-like space where people can relax or meet. The platform rises from the ground level at the first level of the stadium promenade, which is located at 5.44 m. Entrance to all stadium's sections are located exactly on this level. The height of the stadium is 39.33 meters measured from ground level to the upper edge of the roof structure. Construction of the stadium consists of four buildings that are connected by two promenades (at the first and fourth level). All stands on the stadium are one-level with 56 rows. Four-level parking area for cars is located near the stadium.

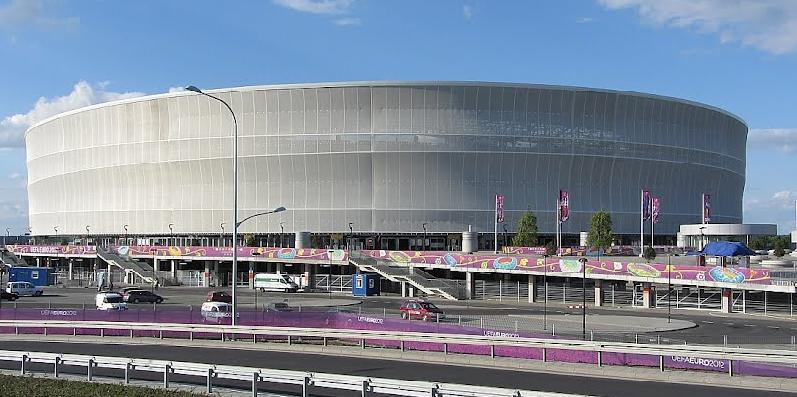
Stadium exterior during UEFA Euro 2012

=== Functions and characteristics ===
The stadium is divided into a number of dedicated zones necessary for the proper functioning of a sport arena. VIP guests is allowed to under the rim of the stadium so that they can quickly reach the spacious VIP zone entry hall on Level 0 in the western section of the stadium. VIP fans is seated in close proximity to the playing field, and is separated from the teams' zone only by a glass wall.

On Level 3, there are twenty multifunction and glassed VIP boxes with a clear view of the pitch. Ten VIP boxes in the eastern stand is available for rental under the name "Incentive Boxes". Each of them has its own access to a terrace platform with a width of about 2.5 m. Depending on the type of boxes, their capacity varies form 13 to 26 people, also they can be combined. Both standard VIP boxes and Incentive boxes have its own dedicated VIP seats located, in the immediate vicinity of the terraces.

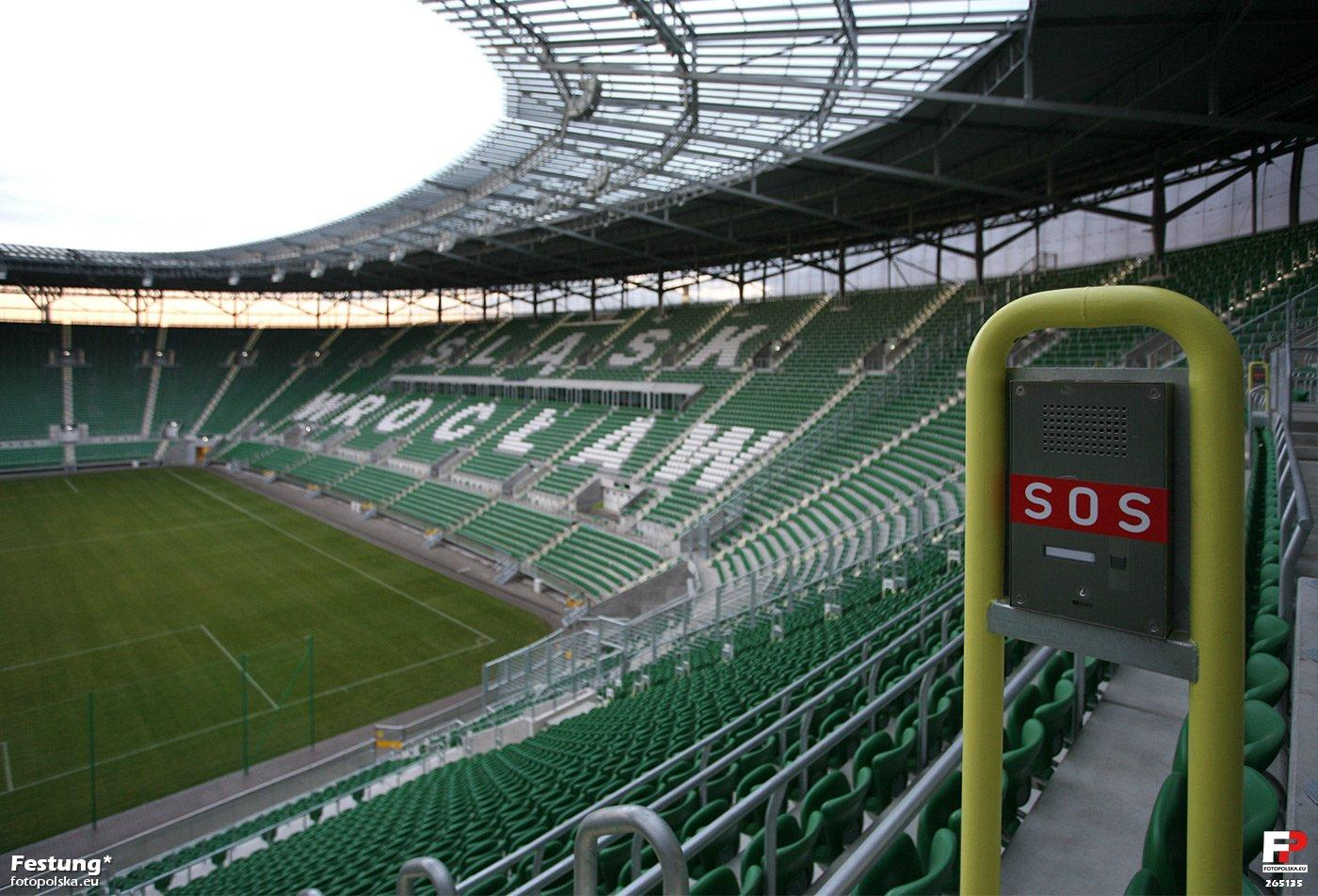
Single-level stands

VIP seats is broken down into three sectors: gold, silver, and bronze, depending on their location and the view they offer.

The esplanade surrounding the entire stadium leads from the ground level to Level 1. Concession stands, first aid stations, police offices and rest rooms are located on the promenade. Seats for fans with disabilities are located in stands equipped with wheelchair ramps, and disabled fans are able to sit next to their caretakers. There are 102 such seats on the stadium plus another 102 seats for caretakers. The stadium bars and restaurants are equipped with special-designated, lower countertops, make it easier for disabled people in wheelchairs to eating a meal. There are also 50 places for people who have vision problems. For the hearing impaired people a professional collector headphones to listening a match commentary are prepared. The new stadium is an arena without barriers.

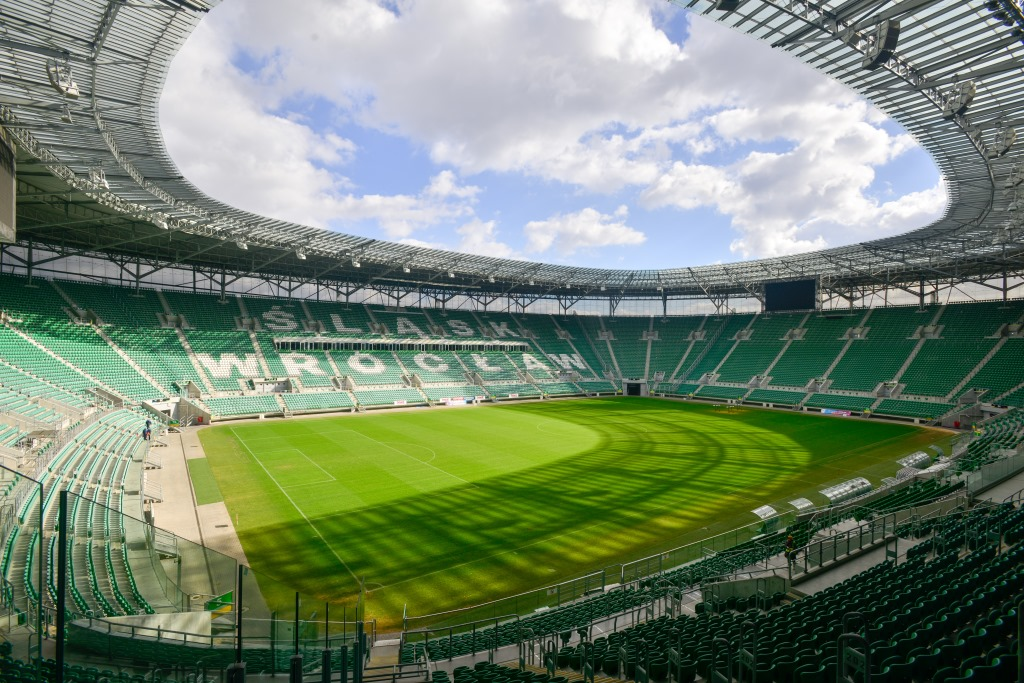
Stadium interior

The teams' zone is located on Level 0 in the western part of the stadium. Identical facilities for both teams are equipped with locker rooms, massage rooms, showers, toilets, coach rooms and warm-up areas. The media zone is located in the upper section of the western stand. Each seat meets FIFA/UEFA requirements and is equipped with power, telephone, internet and TV connections. Some seats have a foldable desktop. Seats for commentators have revolving chairs. Section for visitor supporters is located in the south east stadium corner, marked as “Sektor X” and has a capacity of 3439 seats.

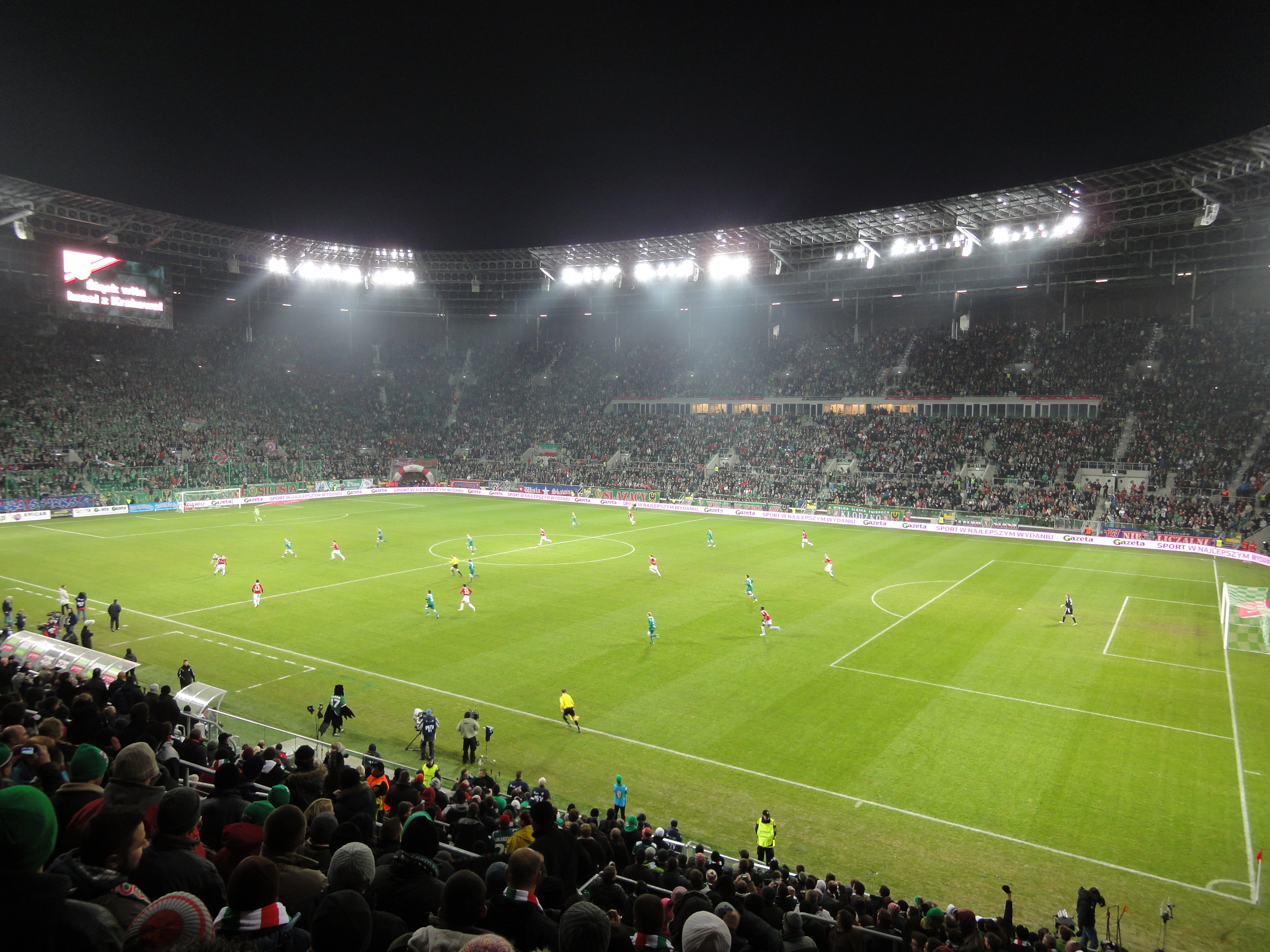
Ekstraklasa match between Śląsk Wrocław - Wisła Kraków

The roof of the stadium is partially glassed for provide increased natural lighting on the pitch. South side of the roof has a more glassed area than the north one. Under the roof there are two LED display screens. Each has dimension of 12,8 x 7,68 m. They were made by Mitsubishi Electric Corporation.

All types of seats installed on the stadium are produced and provided by Polish brand Forum Seating owned by Nowy Styl Group located in Krosno.

=== Naming rights ===
In official documents, the stadium is known as Municipal Stadium (Polish: Stadion Miejski). From 25 November 2021, the stadium is called Tarczyński Arena Wrocław. The city's contract with the Tarczyński Group was concluded for six years. In December 2025, the deal was extended until 2034.

=== Location ===
Stadium is located in Wrocław, in the Fabryczna district administratively belonging to the Pilczyce Osiedle.

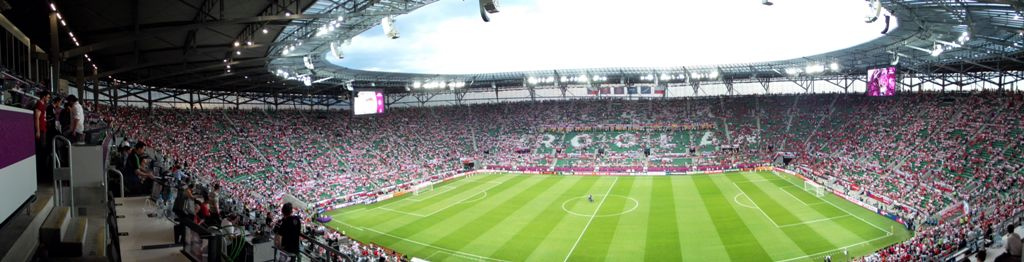
Panorama view of the Stadion Wrocław during the UEFA Euro 2012

== Transport ==
National road 94 runs just south of the stadium. A new motorway bypass A8 was built as part of the infrastructure for the stadium.

Currently, the stadium can be reached by different kinds of public transport. By buses: 103, 403, 435 and tram 18, 21 from the north side, and by the trams 3, 10, 20, 22, and bus 128 from the south side.

On the south side of the stadium, a transport interchange is situated, including a new train station called Wroclaw Stadion. A two-way railway line run at the zero level, while at the first level a tram line is prepared to connect the city centre with Leśnica. The transport interchange is also available for vehicular traffic. A car park, city bus stop, bicycle paths and parking for cyclists are located there. A heliport is located on the eastern side of the stadium.

== Poland national football team matches ==
The Poland national football team plays often in this stadium. The inauguration match was played against Italy on 11 November 2011. The most recent match was played against Wales on 1 June 2022.

Nr	Competition	Date	Opponent	Result	Attendance	Scorers for Poland
1	Friendly	11 November 2011	Italy	0–2	42,000	–––
2	UEFA Euro 2012	16 June 2012	Czech Republic	0–1	41,480	–––
3	2014 FIFA World Cup qualification	11 September 2012	Moldova	2–0	26,145	Jakub Błaszczykowski, Jakub Wawrzyniak
4	Friendly	15 November 2013	Slovakia	0–2	40,605	–––
5	Friendly	18 November 2014	Switzerland	2–2	40,133	Artur Jędrzejczyk, Arkadiusz Milik
6	Friendly	17 November 2015	Czech Republic	3–1	40,793	Arkadiusz Milik, Tomasz Jodłowiec, Kamil Grosicki
7	Friendly	26 March 2016	Finland	5–0	42,068	Kamil Grosicki (2), Paweł Wszołek (2), Filip Starzyński
8	Friendly	14 November 2016	Slovenia	1–1	40,140	Łukasz Teodorczyk
9	Friendly	23 March 2018	Nigeria	0–1	41,208	–––
10	Friendly	11 September 2018	Republic of Ireland	1–1	25,455	Mateusz Klich
11	2020–21 UEFA Nations League	14 October 2020	Bosnia and Herzegovina	3–0	8,152	Robert Lewandowski (2), Karol Linetty
12	Friendly	1 June 2021	Russia	1–1	19,297	Jakub Świerczok
13	2022–23 UEFA Nations League	1 June 2022	Wales	2–1	35,214	Jakub Kamiński, Karol Świderski
14	Friendly	31 May 2026	Ukraine	0–2	37,904	–––
15	2026–27 UEFA Nations League	17 November 2026	Sweden	1–1	38,516	Adrian Benedyczak

== Euro 2012 matches ==
The stadium was used as one of the venues for the UEFA Euro 2012. The three group A matches involving Czech Republic were played there (with the other matches in that group played at National Stadium, Warsaw).

The following matches were played there during the tournament:

Date	Time (CEST)	Team #1	Result	Team #2	Round	Scorer(s)	Attendance
8 June 2012	20:45	Czech Republic	1–4	Russia	Group A	Václav Pilař; Alan Dzagoev (2); Roman Shirokov; Roman Pavlyuchenko	40,803
12 June 2012	18.00	Czech Republic	2–1	Greece	Group A	Petr Jiráček; Václav Pilař; Theofanis Gekas	41,105
16 June 2012	20.45	Poland	0–1	Czech Republic	Group A	Petr Jiráček	41,480

== Finals ==
The 2025 UEFA Conference League final was played at this stadium, and because of UEFA's rules against stadium sponsorships, it was referred to solely as the Wrocław Stadium. The final was played on Wednesday 28 May 20:00 CET, between Real Betis and Chelsea – with Chelsea running out 4–1 winners.

== Boxing ==
On 26 August 2023, the stadium hosted a heavyweight professional boxing match between WBA (Super), IBF, WBO, IBO and The Ring heavyweight champion, Ukrainian, Oleksandr Usyk and WBA (Regular) heavyweight champion, Briton, Daniel Dubois. The bout concluded in Usyk defending his titles by defeating Dubois via knockout in the 9th round.

== Average attendances ==
Tenants	League season	Home games	Average attendance
Śląsk Wrocław	2023-24	17	22,481
Śląsk Wrocław	2022-23	17	10,365

== See also ==
- Wrocław Airport
- Motorway A8 linked with stadium
- List of football stadiums in Poland
- Lists of stadiums
