= Václav Pilař =

Czech footballer (born 1988)

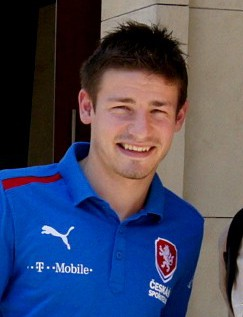
- Pilař in 2012

Personal information
- Full name: Václav Pilař
- Date of birth: 13 October 1988 (age 38)
- Place of birth: Chlumec nad Cidlinou, Czechoslovakia
- Height: 1.71 m (5 ft 7 in)
- Position: Winger

Team information
- Current team: Bohemians 1905

Youth career
- 2006–2008: Hradec Králové

Senior career*
Years	Team	Apps	(Gls)
2009–2012	Hradec Králové	64	(12)
2011–2012	→ Viktoria Plzeň (loan)	25	(7)
2012–2015	VfL Wolfsburg	0	(0)
2013–2014	→ SC Freiburg (loan)	6	(0)
2014–2015	→ Viktoria Plzeň (loan)	28	(4)
2015–2018	Viktoria Plzeň	10	(1)
2018	→ Slovan Liberec (loan)	5	(0)
2018–2020	Sigma Olomouc	27	(1)
2020–2022	Jablonec	46	(6)
2022–2023	Viktoria Plzeň	16	(1)
2023–2026	Hradec Králové	73	(14)
2026–	Bohemians 1905	1	(0)

International career^{‡}
2005–2006	Czech Republic U18	9	(1)
2006–2007	Czech Republic U19	10	(0)
2010	Czech Republic U21	1	(0)
2011–2015	Czech Republic	22	(5)
- * Club domestic league appearances and goals as of 25 July 2026 ‡ National team caps and goals as of 18 July 2017

Václav Pilař (Czech pronunciation: [ˈvaːtslaf ˈpɪlar̝̊]; born 13 October 1988) is a Czech professional footballer who plays as a winger for Bohemians 1905. He represented the Czech Republic at international level between 2011 and 2015.

== Club career ==
Pilař joined Plzeň on loan from Hradec Králové at the beginning of the 2011–12 Czech First League season.

After rejecting to sign a contract with Plzeň in November 2011, Pilař was reported to have signed a contract with German side VfL Wolfsburg. In January 2012, it was announced that Pilař would join VfL Wolfsburg in the summer but would be staying in the Czech Republic in the lead up to the UEFA Euro 2012 tournament.

Pilař was injured in summer 2012, thus did not play any match for Wolfsburg during the 2012–13 Bundesliga. He joined SC Freiburg on loan exactly the following summer. Having been out for 14 months, Pilař returned to action in an October 2013 friendly match for Freiburg against 2. Bundesliga side Sandhausen.

On 10 July 2026, Pilař signed a contract with Bohemians 1905.

== International career ==
Pilař debuted for the Czech Republic on 4 June 2011 at the Kirin Cup against Peru. He scored his first senior international goal against Montenegro in the UEFA Euro 2012 qualifying play-offs in November 2011.

Pilař scored the Czech Republic's first goal in their opening game of the UEFA Euro 2012 tournament against Russia when they were 2–0 down. In the second match of the tournament, Pilař scored the winning goal in the 2–1 victory against Greece, earning the Man of the match accolade in the process.

== Career statistics ==
=== Club ===
As of 1 June 2015

Appearances and goals by club, season and competition
Club	Season	League			Cup		Continental		Total	
Club	Season	Division	Apps	Goals	Apps	Goals	Apps	Goals	Apps	Goals
Hradec Králové	2009–10	Czech 2. Liga	36	9	0	0	0	0	36	9
Hradec Králové	2010–11	Czech First League	28	3	0	0	0	0	28	3
Viktoria Plzeň	2011–12	Czech First League	25	7	0	0	14	3	39	10
VfL Wolfsburg	2012–13	Bundesliga	0	0	0	0	0	0	0	0
SC Freiburg (loan)	2013–14	Bundesliga	6	0	0	0	0	0	6	0
Viktoria Plzeň	2014–15	Czech First League	28	4	0	0	2	1	30	5
Career total			123	23	0	0	16	4	139	27

=== International ===
Appearances and goals by national team and year
National team	Year	Apps	Goals
Czech Republic	2011	6	1
Czech Republic	2012	8	2
Czech Republic	2014	5	1
Czech Republic	2015	3	1
Total		22	5

Scores and results list Czech Republic's goal tally first, score column indicates score after each Pilař goal.

List of international goals scored by Václav Pilař
No.	Date	Venue	Opponent	Score	Result	Competition	Ref.
1	11 November 2011	Generali Arena, Prague, Czech Republic	Montenegro	1–0	2–0	UEFA Euro 2012 qualifying	
2	8 June 2012	Wrocław Stadium, Wrocław, Poland	Russia	1–2	1–4	UEFA Euro 2012	
3	12 June 2012	Wrocław Stadium, Wrocław, Poland	Greece	2–0	2–1	UEFA Euro 2012	
4	9 September 2014	Generali Arena, Prague, Czech Republic	Netherlands	2–1	2–1	UEFA Euro 2016 qualifying	
5	28 March 2015	Eden Arena, Prague, Czech Republic	Latvia	1–1	1–1	UEFA Euro 2016 qualifying	
