= Petr Jiráček =

Czech footballer

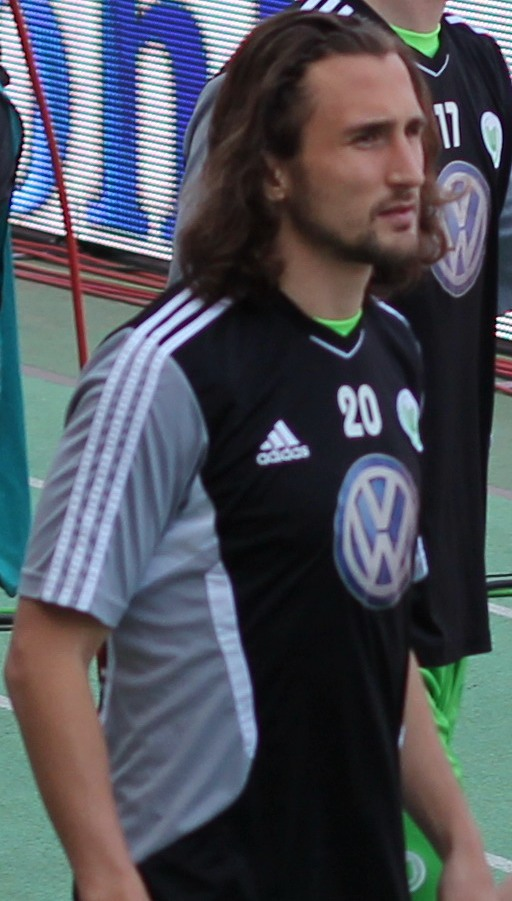
- Jiráček with Wolfsburg in 2012.

Personal information
- Full name: Petr Jiráček
- Date of birth: 2 March 1986 (age 40)
- Place of birth: Sokolov, Czechoslovakia
- Height: 1.80 m (5 ft 11 in)
- Position: Midfielder

Team information
- Current team: Trinity Zlín B (assistant)

Youth career
- 1991–1996: Sokol Tuchořice
- 1996–2006: Baník Sokolov
- 1998: → Buldoci Karlovy Vary (loan)
- 2001: → Slavia Prague (loan)

Senior career*
Years	Team	Apps	(Gls)
2006–2008	Baník Sokolov	40	(2)
2008–2012	Viktoria Plzeň	100	(11)
2012	VfL Wolfsburg	13	(2)
2012–2015	Hamburger SV	41	(2)
2015–2017	Sparta Prague	18	(0)
2016–2017	→ FK Jablonec (loan)	18	(1)
2017–2021	Fastav Zlín	103	(6)
2021–2022	Prostějov	27	(0)
2022	Trinity Zlín B	0	(0)
Total		360	(24)

International career
2011–2014	Czech Republic	28	(3)

Managerial career
- 2022–: Trinity Zlín B (assistant)
- * Club domestic league appearances and goals

Petr Jiráček (born 2 March 1986) is a Czech former footballer. A midfielder, he operates either as a box-to-box or more in an attacking role.

== Career ==
=== Clubs ===
After starting out at Baník Sokolov, club where he had arrived at 10 years old, and spending two professional seasons there, Jiráček made a move to Viktoria Plzeň. With Viktoria, he made exactly 100 league appearances and was a key part in the team that won the 2010–11 Czech championship, a feat never accomplished before in the history of the club. The title also gave them the opportunity to play the 2011–12 UEFA Champions League, in which they reached the group stage, finishing third only behind giants F.C. Barcelona and A.C. Milan. Jiracek only failed to appear in one match at the European competition. He also won the 2009–10 Czech Cup and the 2011 Czech Supercup.

In December 2011, Jiráček signed a four-and-a-half-year deal with German Bundesliga side VfL Wolfsburg. He immediately made an impression as he scored a brace in his fourth league game to secure a 3–2 win against SC Freiburg. He suffered an injury in the end of February, however, that led him to miss a number of matches and be on the bench a few times for the rest of the season.

On 26 August 2012, VfL Wolfsburg head coach Felix Magath confirmed that Jiráček would join Hamburger SV for an undisclosed fee after failing to impress during his stay in Wolfsburg.

=== National team ===
In September 2011, he made a national team debut in a match against Scotland and soon became first choice in the team managed by Michal Bílek. He scored his first goal in a 1–0 win against Montenegro in the Euro 2012 qualifier play-offs.

He went on to play a crucial part in the team that reached the quarterfinals of the UEFA Euro 2012, scoring two goals in the tournament, both opening goals against Greece and Poland in the group stage, being elected the man of the match in the latter match.

=== International goals ===
Scores and results list Czech Republic's goal tally first.

#	Date	Venue	Opponent	Score	Result	Competition
1.	15 November 2011	Podgorica City Stadium, Podgorica	Montenegro	1–0	1–0	Euro 2012 qualifier play-offs
2.	12 June 2012	Municipal Stadium, Wrocław	Greece	1–0	2–1	UEFA Euro 2012
3.	16 June 2012	Municipal Stadium, Wrocław	Poland	1–0	1–0	UEFA Euro 2012

== Career statistics ==
Club performance			League		Cup		Continental		Total	
Season	Club	League	Apps	Goals	Apps	Goals	Apps	Goals	Apps	Goals
Czech Republic			League		Czech Cup		Europe		Total	
2006–07	Baník Sokolov	Czech 2. Liga	15	1	0	0	––		15	1
2007–08	Baník Sokolov	Czech 2. Liga	25	1	2	0	––		27	1
Czech Republic			League		Czech Cup		Europe		Total	
2008–09	Viktoria Plzeň	Czech First League	29	1	0	0	––		29	1
2009–10	Viktoria Plzeň	Czech First League	26	1	3	0	––		29	1
2010–11	Viktoria Plzeň	Czech First League	29	5	4	1	2	0	35	6
2011–12	Viktoria Plzeň	Czech First League	16	4	0	0	11	0	27	4
2015–16	Sparta Praha	Czech First League	18	0	6	2	5	0	29	2
Germany			League		DFB-Pokal		Europe		Total	
2011–12	Wolfsburg	Bundesliga	13	2	0	0	0	0	13	2
2012–13	Hamburger SV	Bundesliga	5	0	0	0	0	0	5	0
Total	Czech Republic		158	13	15	3	18	0	191	16
Total	Germany		18	2	0	0	0	0	18	2
Career total			176	15	15	3	18	0	209	18

== Honours ==
Viktoria Plzeň

- Czech Cup: 2009–10
- Czech First League: 2010–11
- Czech Supercup: 2011
