= Ukraine at the FIFA World Cup =

International football delegation

This is a record of Ukraine's results at the FIFA World Cup. The FIFA World Cup, sometimes called the Football World Cup or the Soccer World Cup, but usually referred to simply as the World Cup, is an international association football competition contested by the men's national teams of the members of Fédération Internationale de Football Association (FIFA), the sport's global governing body. The championship has been awarded every four years since the first tournament in 1930, except in 1942 and 1946, due to World War II.

The tournament consists of two parts, the qualification phase and the final phase (officially called the World Cup Finals). The qualification phase, which currently take place over the three years preceding the Finals, is used to determine which teams qualify for the Finals. The current format of the Finals involves 48 teams competing for the title, at venues within the host nation (or nations) over a period of about a month. The World Cup final is the most widely viewed sporting event in the world, with an estimated 715.1 million people watching the 2006 tournament final.

Ukraine appeared in the 2006 FIFA World Cup where they reached the quarter finals. It was their first ever official appearance at an international tournament since breaking away from the Soviet Union in 1991. However, before 1996 some of its players played for the Soviet Union national football team and CIS national football team. Among few there were Oleksiy Mykhaylychenko, Hennadiy Lytovchenko, Oleh Luzhnyi, Ivan Hetsko and others.

== Overall record ==
Champions Runners-up Third place

FIFA World Cup record									FIFA World Cup qualification record						
Year	Round	Position	Pld	W	D*	L	GF	GA	Pld	W	D	L	GF	GA	Campaign
1930 to 1990	Part of Soviet Union								Part of Soviet Union						
(United States) 1994	Not eligible to participate. (Note: Ukraine was part of the Soviet Union until 1991. Following its independence, the country established its own football association and became a member of FIFA in 1992. FIFA adopted a decision not to allow to participate in the 1994 FIFA World Cup the national teams of those former Soviet republic that did not participate in the qualification draw on 8 December 1991. A proposition of Ukraine to arrange a separate tournament for all successors of the Soviet Union and supported by Georgia and Armenia was blocked by Russia.)								Not eligible to participate.						
(France) 1998	Did not qualify														
(France) 1998	Did not qualify								12	6	3	3	11	9	1998
(South Korea) (Japan) 2002	Did not qualify								12	4	6	2	15	13	2002
(Germany) 2006	Quarter-Finals	8th	5	2	1	2	5	7	12	7	4	1	18	7	2006
(South Africa) 2010	Did not qualify								12	6	4	2	21	7	2010
(Brazil) 2014	Did not qualify								12	7	3	2	30	7	2014
(Russia) 2018	Did not qualify								10	5	2	3	13	9	2018
(Qatar) 2022	Did not qualify								10	3	6	1	14	10	2022
(Canada) (Mexico) (United States) 2026	Did not qualify								7	3	1	3	11	14	2026
(Morocco) (Portugal) (Spain) 2030	To be determined								To be determined						2030
(Saudi Arabia) 2034	To be determined								To be determined						2034
Total	Quarter-finals	1/10	5	2	1	2	5	7	80	38	28	14	122	62	—

* Denotes draws including knockout matches decided via penalty shoot-out.

== Ukraine at 2006 FIFA World Cup ==
At the 2006 FIFA World Cup, Ukraine was drawn in Group H along with Spain, Saudi Arabia, and Tunisia.

Pos	Team	Pld	W	D	L	GF	GA	GD	Pts	Qualification
1	Spain	3	3	0	0	8	1	+7	9	Advance to knockout stage
2	Ukraine	3	2	0	1	5	4	+1	6	Advance to knockout stage
3	Tunisia	3	0	1	2	3	6	−3	1	
4	Saudi Arabia	3	0	1	2	2	7	−5	1	

Source: FIFA
Rules for classification: Tie-breaking criteria

Head coach: Oleg Blokhin

No.	Pos.	Player	Date of birth (age)	Caps	Club
1	GK	Oleksandr Shovkovskyi	2 January 1975 (aged 31)	68	(Ukraine) Dynamo Kyiv
2	DF	Andriy Nesmachniy	28 February 1979 (aged 27)	49	(Ukraine) Dynamo Kyiv
3	DF	Oleksandr Yatsenko	24 February 1985 (aged 21)	1	(Ukraine) Kharkiv
4	MF	Anatoliy Tymoshchuk	30 March 1979 (aged 27)	55	(Ukraine) Shakhtar Donetsk
5	DF	Volodymyr Yezerskyi	15 November 1976 (aged 29)	24	(Ukraine) Dnipro Dnipropetrovsk
6	DF	Andriy Rusol	16 January 1983 (aged 23)	23	(Ukraine) Dnipro Dnipropetrovsk
7	FW	Andriy Shevchenko (c)	29 September 1976 (aged 29)	64	(Italy) Milan
8	MF	Oleh Shelayev	5 November 1976 (aged 29)	19	(Ukraine) Dnipro Dnipropetrovsk
9	MF	Oleh Husyev	25 April 1983 (aged 23)	25	(Ukraine) Dynamo Kyiv
10	FW	Andriy Voronin	21 July 1979 (aged 26)	32	(Germany) Bayer Leverkusen
11	FW	Serhii Rebrov	6 March 1974 (aged 32)	70	(Ukraine) Dynamo Kyiv
12	GK	Andriy Pyatov	28 June 1984 (aged 21)	1	(Ukraine) Vorskla Poltava
13	DF	Dmytro Chyhrynskyi	7 November 1986 (aged 19)	0	(Ukraine) Shakhtar Donetsk
14	MF	Andriy Husin	11 December 1972 (aged 33)	64	(Russia) Krylia Sovetov
15	FW	Artem Milevskyi	12 January 1985 (aged 21)	0	(Ukraine) Dynamo Kyiv
16	FW	Andriy Vorobey	29 November 1978 (aged 27)	53	(Ukraine) Shakhtar Donetsk
17	DF	Vladyslav Vashchuk	2 January 1975 (aged 31)	58	(Ukraine) Dynamo Kyiv
18	MF	Serhiy Nazarenko	16 February 1980 (aged 26)	15	(Ukraine) Dnipro Dnipropetrovsk
19	MF	Maksym Kalynychenko	26 January 1979 (aged 27)	21	(Russia) Spartak Moscow
20	FW	Oleksiy Byelik	15 February 1981 (aged 25)	15	(Ukraine) Shakhtar Donetsk
21	MF	Ruslan Rotan	29 October 1981 (aged 24)	19	(Ukraine) Dynamo Kyiv
22	DF	Vyacheslav Sviderskyi	1 January 1979 (aged 27)	6	(Ukraine) Shakhtar Donetsk
23	GK	Bohdan Shust	4 March 1986 (aged 20)	2	(Ukraine) Shakhtar Donetsk

No.	Pos.	Player	Date of birth (age)	Caps	Club
3	DF	Vyacheslav Shevchuk	13 May 1979 (aged 27)	16	(Ukraine) Shakhtar Donetsk

- Serhiy Fedorov (#3) was injured before the start of the tournament. His replacement, Vyacheslav Shevchuk was also injured shortly after arriving as a replacement. Oleksandr Yatsenko was then called up, and sat on the bench for the last two matches.

=== Spain vs Ukraine ===
14 June 2006
15:00

Spain	4–0	Ukraine
Alonso 13'; Villa 17', 48' (pen.); Torres 81'	Report

Zentralstadion, Leipzig
Attendance: 43,000
Referee: Massimo Busacca (Switzerland)

Spain	Ukraine

GK	1	Iker Casillas (c)
RB	15	Sergio Ramos
CB	22	Pablo
CB	5	Carles Puyol
LB	3	Mariano Pernía
RM	16	Marcos Senna
CM	14	Xabi Alonso	(substituted off) 55'
LM	8	Xavi
RW	21	David Villa	(substituted off) 55'
LW	9	Fernando Torres
CF	11	Luis García	(substituted off) 77'
Substitutions:
MF	6	David Albelda	(substituted on) 55'
FW	7	Raúl	(substituted on) 55'
MF	18	Cesc Fàbregas	(substituted on) 77'
Manager:
Luis Aragonés

GK	1	Oleksandr Shovkovskyi
RB	5	Volodymyr Yezerskiy	(yellow card) 52'
CB	17	Vladyslav Vashchuk	(red card) 47'
CB	6	Andriy Rusol
LB	2	Andriy Nesmachniy	(yellow card) 17'
RM	9	Oleh Husyev		(substituted off) 46'
CM	14	Andriy Husin		(substituted off) 46'
CM	4	Anatoliy Tymoshchuk
LM	21	Ruslan Rotan		(substituted off) 63'
CF	7	Andriy Shevchenko (c)
CF	10	Andriy Voronin
Substitutions:
MF	8	Oleh Shelayev		(substituted on) 46'
FW	16	Andriy Vorobey		(substituted on) 46'
FW	11	Serhii Rebrov		(substituted on) 63'
Manager:
Oleg Blokhin

Man of the Match:
Xavi (Spain)

Assistant referees:
Francesco Buragina (Switzerland)
Matthias Arnet (Switzerland)
Fourth official:
Roberto Rosetti (Italy)
Fifth official:
Cristiano Copelli (Italy)

=== Saudi Arabia vs Ukraine ===
Andriy Rusol put Ukraine ahead in the fourth minute when the ball went in off his knee's at the near post after a corner from the right by Maksym Kalynychenko. Serhii Rebrov got the second goal after 36 minutes with a long range right footed shot that flew past the goalkeeper. Andriy Shevchenko then scored in the 46th minute with a header from six yards out after a free kick from the left by Maksym Kalynychenko. Maksym Kalynychenko got the fourth goal in the 84th minute after a low cross from Andriy Shevchenko from the left which he shot right footed to the roof of the net.

19 June 2006
18:00

Saudi Arabia	0–4	Ukraine
	Report	Rusol 4'; Rebrov 36'; Shevchenko 46'; Kalynychenko; 84'

FIFA WM Stadion Hamburg, Hamburg
Attendance: 50,000
Referee: Graham Poll (England)

Saudi Arabia	Ukraine

GK	21	Mabrouk Zaid
RB	2	Ahmed Dokhi	(yellow card) 41'	(substituted off) 55'
CB	4	Hamad Al-Montashari
CB	3	Redha Tukar
LB	13	Hussein Sulaimani (c)
RM	6	Omar Al-Ghamdi	(yellow card) 57'
CM	16	Khaled Aziz
LM	14	Saud Kariri	(yellow card) 73'
RW	7	Mohammed Ameen		(substituted off) 55'
LW	8	Mohammed Noor		(substituted off) 77'
CF	20	Yasser Al-Qahtani
Substitutions:
FW	23	Malek Mouath		(substituted on) 55'
DF	12	Abdulaziz Khathran		(substituted on) 55'
FW	9	Sami Al-Jaber		(substituted on) 77'
Manager:
(Brazil) Marcos Paquetá

GK	1	Oleksandr Shovkovskyi
RB	9	Oleh Husyev
CB	22	Vyacheslav Sviderskyi	(yellow card) 89'
CB	6	Andriy Rusol
LB	2	Andriy Nesmachniy	(yellow card) 22'
DM	4	Anatoliy Tymoshchuk
CM	8	Oleh Shelayev
CM	19	Maksym Kalynychenko	(yellow card) 77'
SS	11	Serhii Rebrov		(substituted off) 71'
SS	10	Andriy Voronin		(substituted off) 79'
CF	7	Andriy Shevchenko (c)		(substituted off) 86'
Substitutions:
MF	21	Ruslan Rotan		(substituted on) 71'
MF	14	Andriy Husin		(substituted on) 79'
FW	15	Artem Milevskyi		(substituted on) 86'
Manager:
Oleg Blokhin

Man of the Match:
Maksym Kalynychenko (Ukraine)

Assistant referees:
Philip Sharp (England)
Glenn Turner (England)
Fourth official:
Toru Kamikawa (Japan)
Fifth official:
Yoshikazu Hiroshima (Japan)

=== Ukraine vs Tunisia ===
In the 70th minute, Shevchenko was tripped in the penalty box by Karim Hagui and scored from the resulting penalty, shooting right footed to the goalkeepers left as he dived to his right. Ukraine's victory sealed second spot in the group and a second round match against Switzerland. Vyacheslav Sviderskyi and Andriy Rusol were both suspended from the second round after picking up bookings in the match.

23 June 2006
16:00

Ukraine	1–0	Tunisia
Shevchenko 70' (pen.)	Report

Olympiastadion, Berlin
Attendance: 72,000
Referee: Carlos Amarilla (Paraguay)

Ukraine	Tunisia

GK	1	Oleksandr Shovkovskyi
RB	9	Oleh Husyev
CB	6	Andriy Rusol	(yellow card) 65'
CB	22	Vyacheslav Sviderskyi	(yellow card) 18'
LB	2	Andriy Nesmachniy
DM	4	Anatoliy Tymoshchuk	(yellow card) 61'
CM	8	Oleh Shelayev	(yellow card) 47'
CM	19	Maksym Kalynychenko		(substituted off) 75'
SS	11	Serhii Rebrov		(substituted off) 55'
SS	10	Andriy Voronin
CF	7	Andriy Shevchenko (c)		(substituted off) 88'
Substitutions:
FW	16	Andriy Vorobey		(substituted on) 55'
MF	14	Andriy Husin		(substituted on) 75'
FW	15	Artem Milevskyi		(substituted on) 88'
Manager:
Oleg Blokhin

GK	1	Ali Boumnijel
RB	6	Hatem Trabelsi
CB	15	Radhi Jaïdi	(yellow card) 90'
CB	3	Karim Haggui
LB	19	Anis Ayari
RM	13	Riadh Bouazizi (c)	(yellow card) 43'	(substituted off) 79'
CM	8	Mehdi Nafti		(substituted off) 90+1'
CM	12	Jawhar Mnari
LM	14	Adel Chedli		(substituted off) 79'
CF	5	Ziad Jaziri	(yellow card) 9' (yellow-red card) 45+1'
CF	20	Hamed Namouchi
Substitutions:
FW	11	Francileudo Santos		(substituted on) 79'
FW	17	Chaouki Ben Saada		(substituted on) 79'
MF	10	Kaies Ghodhbane		(substituted on) 90+1'
Manager:
(France) Roger Lemerre

Man of the Match:
Anatoliy Tymoshchuk (Ukraine)

Assistant referees:
Amelio Andino (Paraguay)
Manuel Bernal (Paraguay)
Fourth official:
Marco Rodríguez (Mexico)
Fifth official:
Hamdi Al Kadri (Syria)

=== Second round – Switzerland vs Ukraine ===
26 June 2006
21:00

Switzerland	0–0 (a.e.t.)	Ukraine
	Report
Penalties
Streller (penalty missed); Barnetta (penalty missed); Cabanas (penalty missed)	0–3	(penalty missed) Shevchenko; (penalty scored) Milevskyi; (penalty scored) Rebrov; (penalty scored) Husyev

FIFA WM-Stadion Köln, Cologne
Attendance: 45,000
Referee: Benito Archundia (Mexico)

Switzerland	Ukraine

GK	1	Pascal Zuberbühler
RB	23	Philipp Degen
CB	20	Patrick Müller
CB	2	Johan Djourou		(substituted off) 34'
LB	3	Ludovic Magnin
DM	6	Johann Vogel (c)
RM	16	Tranquillo Barnetta	(yellow card) 59'
LM	8	Raphaël Wicky
AM	7	Ricardo Cabanas
SS	22	Hakan Yakin		(substituted off) 64'
CF	9	Alexander Frei		(substituted off) 117'
Substitutions:
DF	13	Stéphane Grichting		(substituted on) 34'
FW	11	Marco Streller		(substituted on) 64'
FW	18	Mauro Lustrinelli		(substituted on) 117'
Manager:
Köbi Kuhn

GK	1	Oleksandr Shovkovskyi
RB	9	Oleh Husyev
CB	17	Vladislav Vashchuk
CB	14	Andriy Husin
LB	2	Andriy Nesmachniy
DM	4	Anatoliy Tymoshchuk
CM	8	Oleh Shelayev
CM	19	Maksym Kalynychenko	(substituted off) 75'
SS	16	Andriy Vorobei	(substituted off) 94'
SS	10	Andriy Voronin	(substituted off) 111'
CF	7	Andriy Shevchenko (c)
Substitutions:
MF	21	Ruslan Rotan	(substituted on) 75'
FW	11	Serhii Rebrov	(substituted on) 94'
FW	15	Artem Milevskyi	(substituted on) 111'
Manager:
Oleg Blokhin

Man of the Match:
Oleksandr Shovkovskyi (Ukraine)

Assistant referees:
José Ramírez (Mexico)
Héctor Vergara (Canada)
Fourth official:
Jerome Damon (South Africa)
Fifth official:
Justice Yeboah (Ghana)

=== Quarter-final – Italy vs Ukraine ===
30 June 2006
21:00

Italy	3–0	Ukraine
Zambrotta 6'; Toni 59', 69'	Report

FIFA WM-Stadion Hamburg, Hamburg
Attendance: 50,000
Referee: Frank De Bleeckere (Belgium)

Italy	Ukraine

GK	1	Gianluigi Buffon
RB	19	Gianluca Zambrotta
CB	5	Fabio Cannavaro (c)
CB	6	Andrea Barzagli
LB	3	Fabio Grosso
CM	8	Gennaro Gattuso	(substituted off) 77'
CM	21	Andrea Pirlo	(substituted off) 68'
RW	16	Mauro Camoranesi	(substituted off) 68'
LW	20	Simone Perrotta
SS	10	Francesco Totti
CF	9	Luca Toni
Substitutions:
MF	17	Simone Barone	(substituted on) 68'
DF	22	Massimo Oddo	(substituted on) 68'
DF	2	Cristian Zaccardo	(substituted on) 77'
Manager:
Marcello Lippi

GK	1	Oleksandr Shovkovskyi
RB	9	Oleh Husyev
CB	22	Vyacheslav Sviderskiy	(yellow card) 16'	(substituted off) 20'
CB	6	Andriy Rusol		(substituted off) 45+2'
LB	2	Andriy Nesmachniy
RM	14	Andriy Husin
CM	4	Anatoliy Tymoshchuk
LM	8	Oleh Shelayev
RW	15	Artem Milevskyi	(yellow card) 67'	(substituted off) 72'
LW	19	Maksym Kalynychenko	(yellow card) 21'
CF	7	Andriy Shevchenko (c)
Substitutions:
FW	16	Andriy Vorobei		(substituted on) 20'
DF	17	Vladislav Vashchuk		(substituted on) 45+2'
FW	20	Oleksiy Byelik		(substituted on) 72'
Manager:
Oleg Blokhin

Man of the Match:
Gennaro Gattuso (Italy)

Assistant referees:
Peter Hermans (Belgium)
Walter Vromans (Belgium)
Fourth official:
Toru Kamikawa (Japan)
Fifth official:
Yoshikazu Hiroshima (Japan)

== Player records ==
=== Most appearances ===
Seven players were fielded in all five of Ukraine's 2006 FIFA World Cup matches. Of those seven, Andriy Nesmachniy, Anatoliy Tymoshchuk and goalkeeper Oleksandr Shovkovskyi played every single minute.

Rank	Player	Matches	World Cups
1	Andriy Husin	5	2006
1	Oleh Husyev	5	2006
1	Andriy Nesmachniy	5	2006
1	Oleh Shelayev	5	2006
1	Andriy Shevchenko	5	2006
1	Oleksandr Shovkovskyi	5	2006
1	Anatoliy Tymoshchuk	5	2006
8	Maksym Kalynychenko	4	2006
8	Artem Milevskyi	4	2006
8	Serhii Rebrov	4	2006
8	Andriy Rusol	4	2006
8	Andriy Vorobey	4	2006
8	Andriy Voronin	4	2006

=== Goalscorers ===
Ukraine's team captain and former Ballon d'Or winner Andriy Shevchenko was the only player to score more than one goal for the side at the 2006 World Cup.

Rank	Player	Goals	World Cups
1	Andriy Shevchenko	2	2006
2	Maksym Kalynychenko	1	2006
2	Serhii Rebrov	1	2006
2	Andriy Rusol	1	2006

== Head-to-head record ==
Opponent	Pld	W	D	L	GF	GA	GD	Win %
Italy	1	0	0	1	0	3	−3	0.00
Saudi Arabia	1	1	0	0	4	0	+4	100.00
Spain	1	0	0	1	0	4	−4	0.00
Switzerland	1	0	1	0	0	0	+0	0.00
Tunisia	1	1	0	0	1	0	+1	100.00
Total	5	2	1	2	5	7	−2	40.00

== See also ==
- Ukraine at the UEFA European Championship

=== Former Soviet states ===
- Russia at the FIFA World Cup (records for Soviet Union)
- Uzbekistan at the FIFA World Cup
