= Uzbekistan at the FIFA World Cup =

International football delegation

Uzbekistan appeared in the FIFA World Cup for the first time in 2026. On 5 June 2025, they qualified for the finals for the first time after an 0–0 away draw with the United Arab Emirates. This makes Uzbekistan the first Central Asian nation, as well as the third former Soviet republic after Russia and Ukraine, to qualify for the World Cup.

== Overall record ==
FIFA World Cup record										Qualification record						
Year	Result	Position	Pld	W	D	L	GF	GA	Squad	Pld	W	D	L	GF	GA	Campaign
1930 to 1990	Part of the Soviet Union									Part of the Soviet Union						
1994	FIFA member from 1992. Not admitted to the tournament. (Note: FIFA adopted a decision not to allow the national teams of those former Soviet republics that did not participate in the qualification draw on 8 December 1991 to participate in the 1994 FIFA World Cup. A proposition by Ukraine, supported by Georgia and Armenia, to arrange a separate tournament for all successor states of the Soviet Union was blocked by Russia.)									Not a FIFA member						1994
(France) 1998	Did not qualify									14	6	4	4	33	21	1998
(South Korea) (Japan) 2002	Did not qualify									14	7	3	4	33	19	2002
(Germany) 2006	Did not qualify									14	6	5	3	24	15	2006
(South Africa) 2010	Did not qualify									16	8	1	7	33	17	2010
(Brazil) 2014	Did not qualify									18	11	5	2	28	9	2014
(Russia) 2018	Did not qualify									18	11	1	6	26	14	2018
(Qatar) 2022	Did not qualify									8	5	0	3	18	9	2022
(Canada) (Mexico) 2026	Group stage	46th	3	0	0	3	2	11	Squad	16	10	5	1	27	11	2026
(Morocco) (Portugal) (Spain) 2030	To be determined									To be determined						2030
(Saudi Arabia) 2034	To be determined									To be determined						2034
Total	—	1/8	3	0	0	3	2	11	—	118	64	24	30	222	115	—

== List of matches ==
Year	Round	Opponent	Score	Uzbekistan scorers
(Canada) (Mexico) (United States) 2026	Group K	Colombia	1–3	Fayzullaev
(Canada) (Mexico) (United States) 2026	Group K	Portugal	0–5	—
(Canada) (Mexico) (United States) 2026	Group K	DR Congo	1–3	Shomurodov

== 2026 FIFA World Cup ==
=== Group stage ===
Pos	Team	Pld	W	D	L	GF	GA	GD	Pts	Qualification
1	Colombia	3	2	1	0	4	1	+3	7	Advance to knockout stage
2	Portugal	3	1	2	0	6	1	+5	5	Advance to knockout stage
3	DR Congo	3	1	1	1	4	3	+1	4	Advance to knockout stage
4	Uzbekistan	3	0	0	3	2	11	−9	0	

Source: FIFA
June 17, 2026
8:00 p.m. UTC−6

Uzbekistan	1–3	Colombia
Fayzullaev 60'	(Note: "Uzbekistan vs Colombia | First Stage | FIFA World Cup 2026". FIFA. Retrieved June 18, 2026.; "Match Report – Group K – Uzbekistan v. Colombia". FIFA. June 18, 2026. Retrieved June 18, 2026.; "Post match summary report – Group K – Uzbekistan v. Colombia". FIFA. June 18, 2026. Retrieved June 19, 2026.)	Muñoz 40'; Díaz 65'; Campaz 90+9'

Estadio Azteca, Mexico City
Attendance: 80,824
Referee: Anthony Taylor (England)

June 23, 2026
12:00 p.m. UTC−5

Portugal	5–0	Uzbekistan
Ronaldo 6', 39'; Mendes 17'; Nematov 60' (o.g.); Leão 87'	(Note: "Portugal vs Uzbekistan | First Stage | FIFA World Cup 2026". FIFA. Retrieved June 23, 2026.; "Match Report – Group K – Portugal v. Uzbekistan". FIFA. June 23, 2026. Retrieved June 23, 2026.; "Post match summary report – Group K – Portugal v. Uzbekistan". FIFA. June 23, 2026. Retrieved June 25, 2026.)

NRG Stadium, Houston
Attendance: 68,777
Referee: Jalal Jayed (Morocco)

June 27, 2026
7:30 p.m. UTC−4

DR Congo	3–1	Uzbekistan
Wissa 68' (pen.), 90+1'; Mayele 78'	(Note: "Congo DR vs Uzbekistan | First Stage | FIFA World Cup 2026". FIFA. Retrieved June 28, 2026.; "Match Report – Group K – Congo DR v. Uzbekistan". FIFA. June 28, 2026. Retrieved June 28, 2026.; "Post match summary report – Group K – Congo DR v. Uzbekistan". FIFA. June 28, 2026. Retrieved June 28, 2026.)	Shomurodov 10'

Mercedes-Benz Stadium, Atlanta
Attendance: 68,239
Referee: Felix Zwayer (Germany)

== Goalscorers ==
On 17 June 2026, Abbosbek Fayzullaev scored Uzbekistan's first-ever FIFA World Cup goal, coming in the 60th minute of their opening match against Colombia in Mexico City.

Player	Goals	2026
Abbosbek Fayzullaev	1	1
Eldor Shomurodov	1	1
Total	2	2

== See also ==
- Asian nations at the FIFA World Cup
- Uzbekistan at the AFC Asian Cup

=== Former Soviet states ===
- Russia at the FIFA World Cup (records for Soviet Union)
- Ukraine at the FIFA World Cup
