= Ukraine at the UEFA European Championship =

International football delegation

Ukraine have appeared in four UEFA European Championships, all consecutively: Euro 2012, Euro 2016, Euro 2020 and Euro 2024. Before 1996, some of its players played for the Soviet Union national team and CIS national team – Oleksiy Mykhailychenko, Hennadiy Lytovchenko, Oleh Luzhnyi, Ivan Hetsko and others.

For UEFA Euro 2012, Ukraine qualified automatically as one of the host countries, marking their début at the major European football tournament. In their opening game against Sweden, Ukraine won 2–1 in Kyiv. Despite the team's efforts, the co-hosts were eliminated after a 0–2 loss to France and a 0–1 loss to England, both in Donetsk. Euro 2012 was the second international tournament at which Ukraine appeared, following the 2006 FIFA World Cup.

For Euro 2016, Ukraine qualified via the play-offs, defeating Slovenia. At the finals in France, they lost all three matches without scoring a goal.

Ukraine qualified for Euro 2020 by finishing top of their qualifying group, and reached the quarter-finals of the tournament for the first time after defeating Sweden 2–1 in the round of 16 after extra time, before being eliminated by England.

Ukraine qualified for Euro 2024 via the play-offs, following a 2–1 victory against Iceland. Despite finishing the group stage with four points, Ukraine still finished bottom due to their inferior goal difference, and were eliminated.

== UEFA Euro 2012 ==
=== Group stage ===
Pos	Team	Pld	W	D	L	GF	GA	GD	Pts	Qualification
1	England	3	2	1	0	5	3	+2	7	Advance to knockout stage
2	France	3	1	1	1	3	3	0	4	Advance to knockout stage
3	Ukraine (H)	3	1	0	2	2	4	−2	3 (Note: Head-to-head result: Ukraine 2–1 Sweden.)	
4	Sweden	3	1	0	2	5	5	0	3	

Source: UEFA
Rules for classification: Group stage tiebreakers
(H) Hosts
Notes:
11 June 2012
21:45 EEST

Ukraine	2–1	Sweden
Shevchenko 55', 61'	Report	Ibrahimović 52'

Olympic Stadium, Kyiv
Attendance: 64,290
Referee: Cüneyt Çakır (Turkey)

15 June 2012
19:00 EEST

Ukraine	0–2	France
	Report	Ménez 53'; Cabaye 56'

Donbas Arena, Donetsk
Attendance: 48,000
Referee: Björn Kuipers (Netherlands)

19 June 2012
21:45 EEST

England	1–0	Ukraine
Rooney 48'	Report

Donbas Arena, Donetsk
Attendance: 48,700
Referee: Viktor Kassai (Hungary)

== UEFA Euro 2016 ==
=== Group stage ===
Pos	Team	Pld	W	D	L	GF	GA	GD	Pts	Qualification
1	Germany	3	2	1	0	3	0	+3	7 (Note: Tied on head-to-head result (Germany 0–0 Poland). Overall goal difference was used as the tiebreaker.)	Advance to knockout stage
2	Poland	3	2	1	0	2	0	+2	7	Advance to knockout stage
3	Northern Ireland	3	1	0	2	2	2	0	3	Advance to knockout stage
4	Ukraine	3	0	0	3	0	5	−5	0	

Source: UEFA
Rules for classification: Group stage tiebreakers
Notes:
12 June 2016
21:00

Germany	2–0	Ukraine
Mustafi 19'; Schweinsteiger 90+2'	Report

Stade Pierre-Mauroy, Villeneuve-d'Ascq
Attendance: 43,035
Referee: Martin Atkinson (England)

16 June 2016
18:00

Ukraine	0–2	Northern Ireland
	Report	McAuley 49'; McGinn 90+6'

Parc Olympique Lyonnais, Décines-Charpieu
Attendance: 51,043
Referee: Pavel Královec (Czech Republic)

21 June 2016
18:00

Ukraine	0–1	Poland
	Report	Błaszczykowski 54'

Stade Vélodrome, Marseille
Attendance: 58,874
Referee: Svein Oddvar Moen (Norway)

== UEFA Euro 2020 ==
=== Group stage ===
Pos	Team	Pld	W	D	L	GF	GA	GD	Pts	Qualification
1	Netherlands (H)	3	3	0	0	8	2	+6	9	Advance to knockout stage
2	Austria	3	2	0	1	4	3	+1	6	Advance to knockout stage
3	Ukraine	3	1	0	2	4	5	−1	3	Advance to knockout stage
4	North Macedonia	3	0	0	3	2	8	−6	0	

Source: UEFA
Rules for classification: Group stage tiebreakers
(H) Hosts
13 June 2021
21:00

Netherlands	3–2	Ukraine
Wijnaldum 52'; Weghorst 58'; Dumfries 85'	Report	Yarmolenko 75'; Yaremchuk 79'

Johan Cruyff Arena, Amsterdam
Attendance: 15,837
Referee: Felix Brych (Germany)

17 June 2021
15:00 (16:00 UTC+3)

Ukraine	2–1	North Macedonia
Yarmolenko 29'; Yaremchuk 34'	Report	Alioski 57'

Arena Națională, Bucharest
Attendance: 10,001
Referee: Fernando Rapallini (Argentina)

21 June 2021
18:00 (19:00 UTC+3)

Ukraine	0–1	Austria
	Report	Baumgartner 21'

Arena Națională, Bucharest
Attendance: 10,472
Referee: Cüneyt Çakır (Turkey)

Ranking of third-placed teams

Pos	Grp	Team	Pld	W	D	L	GF	GA	GD	Pts	Qualification
1	F	Portugal	3	1	1	1	7	6	+1	4	Advance to knockout stage
2	D	Czech Republic	3	1	1	1	3	2	+1	4	Advance to knockout stage
3	A	Switzerland	3	1	1	1	4	5	−1	4	Advance to knockout stage
4	C	Ukraine	3	1	0	2	4	5	−1	3	Advance to knockout stage
5	B	Finland	3	1	0	2	1	3	−2	3	
6	E	Slovakia	3	1	0	2	2	7	−5	3	

Source: UEFA
Rules for classification: 1) Points; 2) Goal difference; 3) Goals scored; 4) Wins; 5) Lower disciplinary points total; 6) European Qualifiers overall ranking.

=== Knockout stage ===
Round of 16

29 June 2021
21:00 (20:00 UTC+1)

Sweden	1–2 (a.e.t.)	Ukraine
Forsberg 43'	Report	Zinchenko 27'; Dovbyk 120+1'

Hampden Park, Glasgow
Attendance: 9,221
Referee: Daniele Orsato (Italy)

Quarter-finals

3 July 2021
21:00

Ukraine	0–4	England
	Report	Kane 4', 50'; Maguire 46'; J. Henderson 63'

Stadio Olimpico, Rome
Attendance: 11,880
Referee: Felix Brych (Germany)

== UEFA Euro 2024 ==
=== Group stage ===
Pos	Team	Pld	W	D	L	GF	GA	GD	Pts	Qualification
1	Romania	3	1	1	1	4	3	+1	4	Advance to knockout stage
2	Belgium	3	1	1	1	2	1	+1	4	Advance to knockout stage
3	Slovakia	3	1	1	1	3	3	0	4	Advance to knockout stage
4	Ukraine	3	1	1	1	2	4	−2	4	

Source: UEFA
17 June 2024
15:00

Romania	3–0	Ukraine
Stanciu 29'; R. Marin 53'; Drăguș 57'	Report

Allianz Arena, Munich
Attendance: 61,591
Referee: Glenn Nyberg (Sweden)

21 June 2024
15:00

Slovakia	1–2	Ukraine
Schranz 17'	Report	Shaparenko 54'; Yaremchuk 80'

Merkur Spiel-Arena, Düsseldorf
Attendance: 43,910
Referee: Michael Oliver (England)

26 June 2024
18:00

Ukraine	0–0	Belgium
	Report

MHPArena, Stuttgart
Attendance: 54,000
Referee: Anthony Taylor (England)

== Overall record ==
Champions Runners-up Third place

UEFA European Championship record									Qualification record							
Year	Round	Position	Pld	W	D*	L	GF	GA	Pld	W	D*	L	GF	GA	→	Outcome
Part of Soviet Union and CIS (1960 to 1992)									Part of Soviet Union and CIS (1960 to 1992)							
as Ukraine									as Ukraine							
(England) 1996	Did not qualify								10	4	1	5	11	15	1996	4th in Qualifying group 4
(Belgium) (Netherlands) 2000	Did not qualify								12	5	6	1	16	7	2000	2nd in Qualifying group 4, lost to Slovenia in play-off
(Portugal) 2004	Did not qualify								8	2	4	2	11	10	2004	3rd in Qualifying group 6
(Austria) (Switzerland) 2008	Did not qualify								12	5	2	5	18	16	2008	4th in Qualifying group B
(Poland) (Ukraine) 2012	Group stage	12th	3	1	0	2	2	4	Host nation						2012	Qualified as host nation
(France) 2016	Group stage	24th	3	0	0	3	0	5	12	7	2	3	17	5	2016	3rd in Qualifying group C, won against Slovenia in play-off
(Europe) 2020	Quarter-finals	8th	5	2	0	3	6	10	8	6	2	0	17	4	2020	Winner of Qualifying group B
(Germany) 2024	Group stage	17th	3	1	1	1	2	4	10	6	2	2	15	10	2024	3rd in Qualifying group C, won against Bosnia and Herzegovina and Iceland in play-offs
(United Kingdom) (Republic of Ireland) 2028	To be determined								To be determined						2028	
(Italy) (Turkey) 2032	To be determined								To be determined						2032	
Total	Quarter-finals	4/8	14	4	1	9	10	23	72	35	19	18	105	67		

*Denotes draws including knockout matches decided via penalty shoot-out.
**Gold background colour indicates that the tournament was won.
***Red border colour indicates that the tournament was held on home soil.

== Head-to-head record ==
Opponent	Pld	W	D	L	GF	GA
Austria	1	0	0	1	0	1
Belgium	1	0	1	0	0	0
England	2	0	0	2	0	5
France	1	0	0	1	0	2
Germany	1	0	0	1	0	2
Netherlands	1	0	0	1	2	3
Northern Ireland	1	0	0	1	0	2
North Macedonia	1	1	0	0	2	1
Poland	1	0	0	1	0	1
Romania	1	0	0	1	0	3
Slovakia	1	1	0	0	2	1
Sweden	2	2	0	0	4	2
Total	14	4	1	9	10	23

== See also ==
- Russia at the UEFA European Championship (records for Soviet Union)
- Ukraine at the FIFA World Cup
