= Russia at the FIFA Confederations Cup =

Football tournament results

Russia national football team had made only in one sole occasion, the 2017 FIFA Confederations Cup as Russia was awarded as host of the 2018 FIFA World Cup in 2010. This was the first, and also the last time Russia participated in the tournament, as the edition was the last edition of the FIFA Confederations Cup.

== Record ==
FIFA Confederations Cup record
Year	Result	Position	Pld	W	D	L	GF	GA
(Saudi Arabia) 1992	Did not qualify							
(Saudi Arabia) 1995	Did not qualify							
(Saudi Arabia) 1997	Did not qualify							
(Mexico) 1999	Did not qualify							
(South Korea) (Japan) 2001	Did not qualify							
(France) 2003	Did not qualify							
(Germany) 2005	Did not qualify							
(South Africa) 2009	Did not qualify							
(Brazil) 2013	Did not qualify							
(Russia) 2017	Group stage	5th	3	1	0	2	3	3
Total	1/10	0 Titles	3	1	0	2	3	3

== Russia 2017 ==
Pos	Team	Pld	W	D	L	GF	GA	GD	Pts	Qualification
1	Portugal	3	2	1	0	7	2	+5	7	Advance to knockout stage
2	Mexico	3	2	1	0	6	4	+2	7	Advance to knockout stage
3	Russia (H)	3	1	0	2	3	3	0	3	
4	New Zealand	3	0	0	3	1	8	−7	0	

Source: FIFA
Rules for classification: Group stage tiebreakers
(H) Hosts
17 June 2017
18:00

Russia	2–0	New Zealand
Boxall 31' (o.g.); Smolov 69'	Report

Krestovsky Stadium, Saint Petersburg
Attendance: 50,251
Referee: Wilmar Roldán (Colombia)

21 June 2017
18:00

Russia	0–1	Portugal
	Report	Ronaldo 8'

Otkritie Arena, Moscow
Attendance: 42,759
Referee: Gianluca Rocchi (Italy)

24 June 2017
18:00

Mexico	2–1	Russia
Araujo 30'; Lozano 52'	Report	Samedov 25'

Kazan Arena, Kazan
Attendance: 41,585
Referee: Fahad Al-Mirdasi (Saudi Arabia)

== Top goalscorers ==
Russia scored three goals in the tournament, however one was an own goal.

No.	Name	Goals	Confederations Cups
1	Fyodor Smolov	1	2017
1	Aleksandr Samedov	1	2017

1 own goal=

- (New Zealand) Michael Boxall (2017)

== See also ==
- Russia at the FIFA World Cup
- Russia at the UEFA European Championship

== Head-to-head record ==
Opponent	Pld	W	D	L	GF	GA	GD	Win %
Mexico	1	0	0	1	1	2	−1	0.00
New Zealand	1	1	0	0	2	0	+2	100.00
Portugal	1	0	0	1	0	1	−1	0.00
Total	3	1	0	2	3	3	+0	33.33
