= UEFA Euro 2016 Group C =

Football tournament group stage

Group C of UEFA Euro 2016 contained Germany, Ukraine, Poland and Northern Ireland. Germany was the only former European champion in this group, having won the championship three times (in 1972 and 1980 as West Germany and in 1996 as unified Germany). Matches were played from 12 to 21 June 2016.

== Teams ==
| Draw position | Team | Pot | Method of qualification | Date of qualification | Finals appearance | Last appearance | Previous best performance | UEFA Rankings October 2015 (Note: The UEFA rankings of October 2015 were used for seeding for the final draw.) | FIFA Rankings June 2016 |
|---|---|---|---|---|---|---|---|---|---|
| C1 | Germany (Note: From 1972 to 1988, Germany competed as West Germany.) | 1 | Group D winner | 11 October 2015 | 12th | 2012 | Winners (1972, 1980, 1996) | 1 | 4 |
| C2 | Ukraine | 2 | Play-off winner | 17 November 2015 | 2nd | 2012 | Group stage (2012) | 14 | 19 |
| C3 | Poland | 3 | Group D runner-up | 11 October 2015 | 3rd | 2012 | Group stage (2012) | 17 | 27 |
| C4 | Northern Ireland | 4 | Group F winner | 8 October 2015 | 1st | — | Debut | 33 | 25 |

== Standings ==
| Pos | Team | Pld | W | D | L | GF | GA | GD | Pts | Qualification |
|---|---|---|---|---|---|---|---|---|---|---|
| 1 | Germany | 3 | 2 | 1 | 0 | 3 | 0 | +3 | 7 (Note: Tied on head-to-head result (Germany 0–0 Poland). Overall goal difference was used as the tiebreaker.) | Advance to knockout stage |
| 2 | Poland | 3 | 2 | 1 | 0 | 2 | 0 | +2 | 7 | Advance to knockout stage |
| 3 | Northern Ireland | 3 | 1 | 0 | 2 | 2 | 2 | 0 | 3 | Advance to knockout stage |
| 4 | Ukraine | 3 | 0 | 0 | 3 | 0 | 5 | −5 | 0 | |

Source: UEFA
Rules for classification: Group stage tiebreakers
Notes:

In the round of 16,

- The winner of Group C, Germany, advanced to play the third-placed team of Group B, Slovakia.
- The runner-up of Group C, Poland, advanced to play the runner-up of Group A, Switzerland.
- The third-placed team of Group C, Northern Ireland, advanced as one of the four best third-placed teams to play the winner of Group B, Wales.

== Matches ==
=== Poland vs Northern Ireland ===
12 June 2016
18:00

| Poland | 1–0 | Northern Ireland |
|---|---|---|
| Milik 51' | Report |

Stade de Nice, Nice
Attendance: 33,742
Referee: Ovidiu Hațegan (Romania)

| Poland | Northern Ireland |

| GK | 1 | Wojciech Szczęsny |
| RB | 20 | Łukasz Piszczek | (yellow card) 89' |
| CB | 15 | Kamil Glik |
| CB | 2 | Michał Pazdan |
| LB | 3 | Artur Jędrzejczyk |
| RM | 16 | Jakub Błaszczykowski | | (substituted off) 80' |
| CM | 10 | Grzegorz Krychowiak |
| CM | 5 | Krzysztof Mączyński | | (substituted off) 78' |
| LM | 21 | Bartosz Kapustka | (yellow card) 65' | (substituted off) 88' |
| SS | 7 | Arkadiusz Milik |
| CF | 9 | Robert Lewandowski (c) |
Substitutions:
| MF | 6 | Tomasz Jodłowiec | | (substituted on) 78' |
| MF | 11 | Kamil Grosicki | | (substituted on) 80' |
| MF | 17 | Sławomir Peszko | | (substituted on) 88' |
Manager:
Adam Nawałka

| GK | 1 | Michael McGovern |
| RB | 2 | Conor McLaughlin |
| CB | 20 | Craig Cathcart | (yellow card) 69' |
| CB | 5 | Jonny Evans |
| LB | 4 | Gareth McAuley |
| RWB | 17 | Paddy McNair | | (substituted off) 46' |
| LWB | 3 | Shane Ferguson | | (substituted off) 66' |
| RM | 16 | Oliver Norwood |
| CM | 8 | Steven Davis (c) |
| LM | 6 | Chris Baird | | (substituted off) 76' |
| CF | 10 | Kyle Lafferty |
Substitutions:
| MF | 14 | Stuart Dallas | | (substituted on) 46' |
| FW | 11 | Conor Washington | | (substituted on) 66' |
| MF | 19 | Jamie Ward | | (substituted on) 76' |
Manager:
Michael O'Neill

Man of the Match:
Grzegorz Krychowiak (Poland)

Assistant referees:
Octavian Șovre (Romania)
Sebastian Gheorghe (Romania)
Fourth official:
Anastasios Sidiropoulos (Greece)
Additional assistant referees:
Alexandru Tudor (Romania)
Sebastian Colţescu (Romania)
Reserve assistant referee:
Damianos Efthymiadis (Greece)

=== Germany vs Ukraine ===
12 June 2016
21:00

| Germany | 2–0 | Ukraine |
|---|---|---|
| Mustafi 19'; Schweinsteiger 90+2' | Report |

Stade Pierre-Mauroy, Villeneuve-d'Ascq
Attendance: 43,035
Referee: Martin Atkinson (England)

| Germany | Ukraine |

| GK | 1 | Manuel Neuer (c) |
| RB | 4 | Benedikt Höwedes |
| CB | 17 | Jérôme Boateng |
| CB | 2 | Shkodran Mustafi |
| LB | 3 | Jonas Hector |
| CM | 6 | Sami Khedira |
| CM | 18 | Toni Kroos |
| RW | 13 | Thomas Müller |
| AM | 8 | Mesut Özil |
| LW | 11 | Julian Draxler | (substituted off) 78' |
| CF | 19 | Mario Götze | (substituted off) 90' |
Substitutions:
| MF | 9 | André Schürrle | (substituted on) 78' |
| MF | 7 | Bastian Schweinsteiger | (substituted on) 90' |
Manager:
Joachim Löw

| GK | 12 | Andriy Pyatov |
| RB | 17 | Artem Fedetskyi |
| CB | 3 | Yevhen Khacheridi |
| CB | 20 | Yaroslav Rakitskiy |
| LB | 13 | Vyacheslav Shevchuk (c) |
| CM | 16 | Serhiy Sydorchuk |
| CM | 6 | Taras Stepanenko |
| RW | 7 | Andriy Yarmolenko |
| AM | 9 | Viktor Kovalenko | | (substituted off) 73' |
| LW | 10 | Yevhen Konoplyanka | (yellow card) 68' |
| CF | 8 | Roman Zozulya | | (substituted off) 66' |
Substitutions:
| FW | 11 | Yevhen Seleznyov | | (substituted on) 66' |
| MF | 21 | Oleksandr Zinchenko | | (substituted on) 73' |
Manager:
Mykhaylo Fomenko

Man of the Match:
Toni Kroos (Germany)

Assistant referees:
Michael Mullarkey (England)
Stephen Child (England)
Fourth official:
Bobby Madden (Scotland)
Additional assistant referees:
Michael Oliver (England)
Craig Pawson (England)
Reserve assistant referee:
Francis Connor (Scotland)

=== Ukraine vs Northern Ireland ===
16 June 2016
18:00

| Ukraine | 0–2 | Northern Ireland |
|---|---|---|
| | Report | McAuley 49'; McGinn 90+6' |

Parc Olympique Lyonnais, Décines-Charpieu
Attendance: 51,043
Referee: Pavel Královec (Czech Republic)

| Ukraine | Northern Ireland |

| GK | 12 | Andriy Pyatov |
| RB | 17 | Artem Fedetskyi |
| CB | 3 | Yevhen Khacheridi |
| CB | 20 | Yaroslav Rakitskiy |
| LB | 13 | Vyacheslav Shevchuk (c) |
| CM | 16 | Serhiy Sydorchuk | (yellow card) 67' | (substituted off) 76' |
| CM | 6 | Taras Stepanenko |
| RW | 7 | Andriy Yarmolenko |
| AM | 9 | Viktor Kovalenko | | (substituted off) 83' |
| LW | 10 | Yevhen Konoplyanka |
| CF | 11 | Yevhen Seleznyov | (yellow card) 40' | (substituted off) 71' |
Substitutions:
| FW | 8 | Roman Zozulya | | (substituted on) 71' |
| MF | 19 | Denys Harmash | | (substituted on) 76' |
| MF | 21 | Oleksandr Zinchenko | | (substituted on) 83' |
Manager:
Mykhaylo Fomenko

| GK | 1 | Michael McGovern |
| RB | 18 | Aaron Hughes |
| CB | 20 | Craig Cathcart |
| CB | 4 | Gareth McAuley |
| LB | 5 | Jonny Evans | (yellow card) 90+4' |
| RM | 19 | Jamie Ward | (yellow card) 63' | (substituted off) 69' |
| CM | 13 | Corry Evans | | (substituted off) 90+3' |
| CM | 8 | Steven Davis (c) |
| CM | 16 | Oliver Norwood |
| LM | 14 | Stuart Dallas | (yellow card) 87' |
| CF | 11 | Conor Washington | | (substituted off) 84' |
Substitutions:
| MF | 7 | Niall McGinn | | (substituted on) 69' |
| FW | 21 | Josh Magennis | | (substituted on) 84' |
| DF | 17 | Paddy McNair | | (substituted on) 90+3' |
Manager:
Michael O'Neill

Man of the Match:
Gareth McAuley (Northern Ireland)

Assistant referees:
Roman Slyško (Slovakia)
Tomáš Mokrusch (Czech Republic)
Fourth official:
Anastasios Sidiropoulos (Greece)
Additional assistant referees:
Petr Ardeleánu (Czech Republic)
Michal Paták (Czech Republic)
Reserve assistant referee:
Damianos Efthymiadis (Greece)

=== Germany vs Poland ===
16 June 2016
21:00

| Germany | 0–0 | Poland |
|---|---|---|
| | Report |

Stade de France, Saint-Denis
Attendance: 73,648
Referee: Björn Kuipers (Netherlands)

| Germany | Poland |

| GK | 1 | Manuel Neuer (c) |
| RB | 4 | Benedikt Höwedes |
| CB | 17 | Jérôme Boateng | (yellow card) 67' |
| CB | 5 | Mats Hummels |
| LB | 3 | Jonas Hector |
| CM | 18 | Toni Kroos |
| CM | 6 | Sami Khedira | (yellow card) 3' |
| RW | 13 | Thomas Müller |
| AM | 8 | Mesut Özil | (yellow card) 34' |
| LW | 11 | Julian Draxler | | (substituted off) 71' |
| CF | 19 | Mario Götze | | (substituted off) 66' |
Substitutions:
| MF | 9 | André Schürrle | | (substituted on) 66' |
| FW | 23 | Mario Gómez | | (substituted on) 71' |
Manager:
Joachim Löw

| GK | 22 | Łukasz Fabiański |
| RB | 20 | Łukasz Piszczek |
| CB | 15 | Kamil Glik |
| CB | 2 | Michał Pazdan |
| LB | 3 | Artur Jędrzejczyk |
| CM | 10 | Grzegorz Krychowiak |
| CM | 5 | Krzysztof Mączyński | (yellow card) 45' | (substituted off) 76' |
| RW | 16 | Jakub Błaszczykowski | | (substituted off) 80' |
| LW | 11 | Kamil Grosicki | (yellow card) 55' | (substituted off) 87' |
| CF | 7 | Arkadiusz Milik |
| CF | 9 | Robert Lewandowski (c) |
Substitutions:
| MF | 6 | Tomasz Jodłowiec | | (substituted on) 76' |
| MF | 21 | Bartosz Kapustka | | (substituted on) 80' |
| MF | 17 | Sławomir Peszko | (yellow card) 90+3' | (substituted on) 87' |
Manager:
Adam Nawałka

Man of the Match:
Jérôme Boateng (Germany)

Assistant referees:
Sander van Roekel (Netherlands)
Erwin Zeinstra (Netherlands)
Fourth official:
Daniele Orsato (Italy)
Additional assistant referees:
Pol van Boekel (Netherlands)
Richard Liesveld (Netherlands)
Reserve assistant referee:
Elenito Di Liberatore (Italy)

=== Ukraine vs Poland ===
21 June 2016
18:00

| Ukraine | 0–1 | Poland |
|---|---|---|
| | Report | Błaszczykowski 54' |

Stade Vélodrome, Marseille
Attendance: 58,874
Referee: Svein Oddvar Moen (Norway)

| Ukraine | Poland |

| GK | 12 | Andriy Pyatov |
| RB | 17 | Artem Fedetskyi |
| CB | 3 | Yevhen Khacheridi |
| CB | 5 | Oleksandr Kucher | (yellow card) 38' |
| LB | 2 | Bohdan Butko |
| CM | 14 | Ruslan Rotan (c) | (yellow card) 25' |
| CM | 6 | Taras Stepanenko |
| RW | 7 | Andriy Yarmolenko |
| AM | 21 | Oleksandr Zinchenko | | (substituted off) 73' |
| LW | 10 | Yevhen Konoplyanka |
| CF | 8 | Roman Zozulya | | (substituted off) 90+2' |
Substitutions:
| MF | 9 | Viktor Kovalenko | | (substituted on) 73' |
| MF | 4 | Anatoliy Tymoshchuk | | (substituted on) 90+2' |
Manager:
Mykhaylo Fomenko

| GK | 22 | Łukasz Fabiański |
| RB | 4 | Thiago Cionek |
| CB | 15 | Kamil Glik |
| CB | 2 | Michał Pazdan |
| LB | 3 | Artur Jędrzejczyk |
| CM | 6 | Tomasz Jodłowiec |
| CM | 10 | Grzegorz Krychowiak |
| RW | 19 | Piotr Zieliński | | (substituted off) 46' |
| LW | 21 | Bartosz Kapustka | (yellow card) 60' | (substituted off) 71' |
| SS | 7 | Arkadiusz Milik | | (substituted off) 90+3' |
| CF | 9 | Robert Lewandowski (c) |
Substitutions:
| MF | 16 | Jakub Błaszczykowski | | (substituted on) 46' |
| MF | 11 | Kamil Grosicki | | (substituted on) 71' |
| MF | 23 | Filip Starzyński | | (substituted on) 90+3' |
Manager:
Adam Nawałka

Man of the Match:
Ruslan Rotan (Ukraine)

Assistant referees:
Kim Thomas Haglund (Norway)
Frank Andås (Norway)
Fourth official:
Hüseyin Göçek (Turkey)
Additional assistant referees:
Ken Henry Johnsen (Norway)
Svein-Erik Edvartsen (Norway)
Reserve assistant referee:
Bahattin Duran (Turkey)

=== Northern Ireland vs Germany ===
21 June 2016
18:00

| Northern Ireland | 0–1 | Germany |
|---|---|---|
| | Report | Gómez 30' |

Parc des Princes, Paris
Attendance: 44,125
Referee: Clément Turpin (France)

| Northern Ireland | Germany |

| GK | 1 | Michael McGovern |
| RB | 18 | Aaron Hughes |
| CB | 4 | Gareth McAuley |
| CB | 20 | Craig Cathcart |
| LB | 5 | Jonny Evans |
| DM | 8 | Steven Davis (c) |
| CM | 13 | Corry Evans | (substituted off) 84' |
| CM | 16 | Oliver Norwood |
| RW | 19 | Jamie Ward | (substituted off) 70' |
| LW | 14 | Stuart Dallas |
| CF | 11 | Conor Washington | (substituted off) 59' |
Substitutions:
| FW | 10 | Kyle Lafferty | (substituted on) 59' |
| FW | 21 | Josh Magennis | (substituted on) 70' |
| MF | 7 | Niall McGinn | (substituted on) 84' |
Manager:
Michael O'Neill

| GK | 1 | Manuel Neuer (c) |
| RB | 21 | Joshua Kimmich |
| CB | 17 | Jérôme Boateng | (substituted off) 76' |
| CB | 5 | Mats Hummels |
| LB | 3 | Jonas Hector |
| CM | 6 | Sami Khedira | (substituted off) 69' |
| CM | 18 | Toni Kroos |
| RW | 8 | Mesut Özil |
| AM | 13 | Thomas Müller |
| LW | 19 | Mario Götze | (substituted off) 55' |
| CF | 23 | Mario Gómez |
Substitutions:
| MF | 9 | André Schürrle | (substituted on) 55' |
| MF | 7 | Bastian Schweinsteiger | (substituted on) 69' |
| DF | 4 | Benedikt Höwedes | (substituted on) 76' |
Manager:
Joachim Löw

Man of the Match:
Mesut Özil (Germany)

Assistant referees:
Frédéric Cano (France)
Nicolas Danos (France)
Fourth official:
Slavko Vinčić (Slovenia)
Additional assistant referees:
Benoît Bastien (France)
Fredy Fautrel (France)
Reserve assistant referee:
Robert Vukan (Slovenia)

== See also ==
- Germany at the UEFA European Championship
- Northern Ireland at the UEFA European Championship
- Poland at the UEFA European Championship
- Ukraine at the UEFA European Championship
