= UEFA Euro 2012 Group D =

Football tournament group stage

Group D of UEFA Euro 2012 began on 11 June 2012 and ended on 19 June 2012. The pool was made up of Ukraine, Sweden, France and England. The top two teams, England and France, progressed to the quarter-finals to play Italy and Spain respectively, while Ukraine and Sweden were eliminated from the tournament.

On the second matchday, on 15 June, the match between Ukraine and France that began at 19:00 local time was interrupted by heavy rainfall and a thunderstorm. The conditions forced the referee to suspend the game during the fifth minute, and play was only resumed 58 minutes later. UEFA therefore delayed the match between Sweden and England to kick off 15 minutes later than originally scheduled, instead beginning at 22:00 local time, to avoid the matches overlapping.

On the final matchday, on 19 June, the match between England and Ukraine featured a ghost goal by Marko Dević. In the second half, with Ukraine losing 1–0 to a Wayne Rooney goal, Dević's shot was hooked clear from behind the England goal-line by John Terry under the eyes of the additional assistant referee standing beside the goal (as confirmed by video replays). The incident reopened football's goal-line technology debate. Although in the build-up to the incident, Dević's teammate Artem Milevskyi was in an offside position when the ball was played to him, which also went unnoticed by the match officials. UEFA and its chief refereeing officer Pierluigi Collina admitted on the following day that an error had been made and that Ukraine had been denied a legitimate goal.

== Teams ==
Draw position	Team	Pot	Method of qualification	Date of qualification	Finals appearance	Last appearance	Previous best performance	UEFA Rankings November 2011 (Note: The UEFA rankings of November 2011 were used for seeding for the final draw.)	FIFA Rankings June 2012
D1	Ukraine	1	Co-host	18 April 2007	1st	—	Debut	15	52
D2	Sweden	3	Best runner-up	11 October 2011	5th	2008	Semi-finals (1992)	10	17
D3	France	4	Group D winner	11 October 2011	8th	2008	Winners (1984, 2000)	12	14
D4	England	2	Group G winner	7 October 2011	8th	2004	Third place (1968), Semi-finals (1996)	5	6

== Standings ==
Pos	Team	Pld	W	D	L	GF	GA	GD	Pts	Qualification
1	England	3	2	1	0	5	3	+2	7	Advance to knockout stage
2	France	3	1	1	1	3	3	0	4	Advance to knockout stage
3	Ukraine (H)	3	1	0	2	2	4	−2	3 (Note: Head-to-head result: Ukraine 2–1 Sweden.)	
4	Sweden	3	1	0	2	5	5	0	3	

Source: UEFA
Rules for classification: Group stage tiebreakers
(H) Hosts
Notes:

In the quarter-finals,

- The winner of Group D, England, advanced to play the runner-up of Group C, Italy.
- The runner-up of Group D, France, advanced to play the winner of Group C, Spain.

== Matches ==
=== France vs England ===
11 June 2012
19:00

France	1–1	England
Nasri 39'	Report	Lescott 30'

Donbas Arena, Donetsk
Attendance: 47,400
Referee: Nicola Rizzoli (Italy)

France	England

GK	1	Hugo Lloris (c)
RB	2	Mathieu Debuchy
CB	4	Adil Rami
CB	5	Philippe Mexès
LB	3	Patrice Evra
DM	18	Alou Diarra
CM	6	Yohan Cabaye	(substituted off) 84'
CM	15	Florent Malouda	(substituted off) 85'
RW	11	Samir Nasri
LW	7	Franck Ribéry
CF	10	Karim Benzema
Substitutions:
MF	20	Hatem Ben Arfa	(substituted on) 84'
MF	19	Marvin Martin	(substituted on) 85'
Manager:
Laurent Blanc

GK	1	Joe Hart
RB	2	Glen Johnson
CB	6	John Terry
CB	15	Joleon Lescott
LB	3	Ashley Cole
RM	16	James Milner
CM	4	Steven Gerrard (c)
CM	17	Scott Parker		(substituted off) 78'
LM	20	Alex Oxlade-Chamberlain	(yellow card) 34'	(substituted off) 77'
SS	11	Ashley Young	(yellow card) 71'
CF	22	Danny Welbeck		(substituted off) 90+1'
Substitutions:
FW	21	Jermain Defoe		(substituted on) 77'
MF	8	Jordan Henderson		(substituted on) 78'
MF	7	Theo Walcott		(substituted on) 90+1'
Manager:
Roy Hodgson

Man of the Match:
Samir Nasri (France)

Assistant referees:
Renato Faverani (Italy)
Andrea Stefani (Italy)
Fourth official:
Pavel Královec (Czech Republic)
Additional assistant referees:
Gianluca Rocchi (Italy)
Paolo Tagliavento (Italy)
Reserve assistant referee:
Roman Slyško (Slovakia)

=== Ukraine vs Sweden ===
11 June 2012
21:45

Ukraine	2–1	Sweden
Shevchenko 55', 61'	Report	Ibrahimović 52'

Olympic Stadium, Kyiv
Attendance: 64,290
Referee: Cüneyt Çakır (Turkey)

Ukraine	Sweden

GK	12	Andriy Pyatov
RB	9	Oleh Husiev
CB	17	Taras Mykhalyk
CB	3	Yevhen Khacheridi
LB	2	Yevhen Selin
RM	11	Andriy Yarmolenko
CM	4	Anatoliy Tymoshchuk
LM	19	Yevhen Konoplyanka	(substituted off) 90+3'
AM	18	Serhiy Nazarenko
SS	10	Andriy Voronin	(substituted off) 85'
CF	7	Andriy Shevchenko (c)	(substituted off) 81'
Substitutions:
MF	15	Artem Milevskyi	(substituted on) 81'
MF	14	Ruslan Rotan	(substituted on) 85'
FW	22	Marko Dević	(substituted on) 90+3'
Manager:
Oleg Blokhin

GK	1	Andreas Isaksson
RB	2	Mikael Lustig
CB	3	Olof Mellberg
CB	4	Andreas Granqvist
LB	5	Martin Olsson
CM	6	Rasmus Elm	(yellow card) 83'
CM	9	Kim Källström	(yellow card) 11'
RW	7	Sebastian Larsson		(substituted off) 68'
AM	10	Zlatan Ibrahimović (c)
LW	20	Ola Toivonen		(substituted off) 62'
CF	22	Markus Rosenberg		(substituted off) 71'
Substitutions:
MF	8	Anders Svensson		(substituted on) 62'
MF	21	Christian Wilhelmsson		(substituted on) 68'
FW	11	Johan Elmander		(substituted on) 71'
Manager:
Erik Hamrén

Man of the Match:
Andriy Shevchenko (Ukraine)

Assistant referees:
Bahattin Duran (Turkey)
Tarık Ongun (Turkey)
Fourth official:
Marcin Borski (Poland)
Additional assistant referees:
Hüseyin Göçek (Turkey)
Bülent Yıldırım (Turkey)
Reserve assistant referee:
Marcin Borkowski (Poland)

=== Ukraine vs France ===
At 19:05 EEST, in the 5th minute, the match was interrupted due to severe weather. The match resumed at 20:02 EEST.

15 June 2012
19:00

Ukraine	0–2	France
	Report	Ménez 53'; Cabaye 56'

Donbas Arena, Donetsk
Attendance: 48,000
Referee: Björn Kuipers (Netherlands)

Ukraine	France

GK	12	Andriy Pyatov
RB	9	Oleh Husiev
CB	17	Taras Mykhalyk
CB	3	Yevhen Khacheridi
LB	2	Yevhen Selin	(yellow card) 55'
CM	4	Anatoliy Tymoshchuk	(yellow card) 87'
CM	10	Andriy Voronin		(substituted off) 46'
RW	11	Andriy Yarmolenko		(substituted off) 68'
AM	18	Serhiy Nazarenko		(substituted off) 60'
LW	19	Yevhen Konoplyanka
CF	7	Andriy Shevchenko (c)
Substitutions:
FW	22	Marko Dević		(substituted on) 46'
FW	15	Artem Milevskyi		(substituted on) 60'
MF	8	Oleksandr Aliyev		(substituted on) 68'
Manager:
Oleg Blokhin

GK	1	Hugo Lloris (c)
RB	2	Mathieu Debuchy	(yellow card) 79'
CB	4	Adil Rami
CB	5	Philippe Mexès	(yellow card) 81'
LB	22	Gaël Clichy
DM	18	Alou Diarra
CM	11	Samir Nasri
CM	6	Yohan Cabaye		(substituted off) 68'
RW	14	Jérémy Ménez	(yellow card) 40'	(substituted off) 73'
LW	7	Franck Ribéry
CF	10	Karim Benzema		(substituted off) 76'
Substitutions:
MF	17	Yann M'Vila		(substituted on) 68'
MF	19	Marvin Martin		(substituted on) 73'
FW	9	Olivier Giroud		(substituted on) 76'
Manager:
Laurent Blanc

Man of the Match:
Franck Ribéry (France)

Assistant referees:
Sander van Roekel (Netherlands)
Erwin Zeinstra (Netherlands)
Fourth official:
Tom Harald Hagen (Norway)
Additional assistant referees:
Pol van Boekel (Netherlands)
Richard Liesveld (Netherlands)
Reserve assistant referee:
Damien MacGraith (Republic of Ireland)

=== Sweden vs England ===
15 June 2012
22:00 (Note: The match, originally scheduled for 21:45 local time, was delayed 15 minutes to prevent overlap with the other Group D match between Ukraine and France, which had been delayed due to rain.)

Sweden	2–3	England
Johnson 49' (o.g.); Mellberg 59'	Report	Carroll 23'; Walcott 64'; Welbeck 78'

Olympic Stadium, Kyiv
Attendance: 64,640
Referee: Damir Skomina (Slovenia)

Sweden	England

GK	1	Andreas Isaksson
RB	4	Andreas Granqvist		(substituted off) 66'
CB	3	Olof Mellberg	(yellow card) 63'
CB	13	Jonas Olsson	(yellow card) 72'
LB	5	Martin Olsson
RM	7	Sebastian Larsson
CM	8	Anders Svensson	(yellow card) 90+1'
CM	9	Kim Källström
LM	6	Rasmus Elm		(substituted off) 81'
SS	10	Zlatan Ibrahimović (c)
CF	11	Johan Elmander		(substituted off) 79'
Substitutions:
DF	2	Mikael Lustig		(substituted on) 66'
FW	22	Markus Rosenberg		(substituted on) 79'
MF	21	Christian Wilhelmsson		(substituted on) 81'
Manager:
Erik Hamrén

GK	1	Joe Hart
RB	2	Glen Johnson
CB	6	John Terry
CB	15	Joleon Lescott
LB	3	Ashley Cole
RM	16	James Milner	(yellow card) 58'	(substituted off) 61'
CM	4	Steven Gerrard (c)
CM	17	Scott Parker
LM	11	Ashley Young
SS	22	Danny Welbeck		(substituted off) 90'
CF	9	Andy Carroll
Substitutions:
MF	7	Theo Walcott		(substituted on) 61'
MF	20	Alex Oxlade-Chamberlain		(substituted on) 90'
Manager:
Roy Hodgson

Man of the Match:
Olof Mellberg (Sweden)

Assistant referees:
Primož Arhar (Slovenia)
Matej Žunič (Slovenia)
Fourth official:
Florian Meyer (Germany)
Additional assistant referees:
Matej Jug (Slovenia)
Slavko Vinčić (Slovenia)
Reserve assistant referee:
Jan-Hendrik Salver (Germany)

=== England vs Ukraine ===
19 June 2012
21:45

England	1–0	Ukraine
Rooney 48'	Report

Donbas Arena, Donetsk
Attendance: 48,700
Referee: Viktor Kassai (Hungary)

England	Ukraine

GK	1	Joe Hart
RB	2	Glen Johnson
CB	6	John Terry
CB	15	Joleon Lescott
LB	3	Ashley Cole	(yellow card) 78'
RM	16	James Milner		(substituted off) 70'
CM	4	Steven Gerrard (c)	(yellow card) 73'
CM	17	Scott Parker
LM	11	Ashley Young
SS	10	Wayne Rooney		(substituted off) 87'
CF	22	Danny Welbeck		(substituted off) 82'
Substitutions:
MF	7	Theo Walcott		(substituted on) 70'
FW	9	Andy Carroll		(substituted on) 82'
MF	20	Alex Oxlade-Chamberlain		(substituted on) 87'
Manager:
Roy Hodgson

GK	12	Andriy Pyatov
RB	9	Oleh Husiev
CB	3	Yevhen Khacheridi
CB	20	Yaroslav Rakitskyi	(yellow card) 74'
LB	2	Yevhen Selin
DM	4	Anatoliy Tymoshchuk (c)	(yellow card) 63'
RM	11	Andriy Yarmolenko
LM	19	Yevhen Konoplyanka
AM	6	Denys Harmash		(substituted off) 78'
SS	15	Artem Milevskyi		(substituted off) 77'
CF	22	Marko Dević		(substituted off) 70'
Substitutions:
FW	7	Andriy Shevchenko	(yellow card) 86'	(substituted on) 70'
DF	21	Bohdan Butko		(substituted on) 77'
MF	18	Serhiy Nazarenko		(substituted on) 78'
Manager:
Oleg Blokhin

Man of the Match:
Steven Gerrard (England)

Assistant referees:
Gábor Erős (Hungary)
György Ring (Hungary)
Fourth official:
Tom Harald Hagen (Norway)
Additional assistant referees:
István Vad (Hungary)
Tamás Bognár (Hungary)
Reserve assistant referee:
Damien MacGraith (Republic of Ireland)

=== Sweden vs France ===
19 June 2012
21:45

Sweden	2–0	France
Ibrahimović 54'; Larsson 90+1'	Report

Olympic Stadium, Kyiv
Attendance: 63,010
Referee: Pedro Proença (Portugal)

Sweden	France

GK	1	Andreas Isaksson
RB	4	Andreas Granqvist
CB	3	Olof Mellberg
CB	13	Jonas Olsson
LB	5	Martin Olsson
CM	8	Anders Svensson	(yellow card) 70'	(substituted off) 79'
CM	9	Kim Källström
RW	7	Sebastian Larsson
AM	10	Zlatan Ibrahimović (c)
LW	19	Emir Bajrami		(substituted off) 46'
CF	20	Ola Toivonen		(substituted off) 78'
Substitutions:
MF	21	Christian Wilhelmsson		(substituted on) 46'
MF	16	Pontus Wernbloom		(substituted on) 78'
MF	18	Samuel Holmén	(yellow card) 81'	(substituted on) 79'
Manager:
Erik Hamrén

GK	1	Hugo Lloris (c)
RB	2	Mathieu Debuchy
CB	4	Adil Rami
CB	5	Philippe Mexès	(yellow card) 68'
LB	22	Gaël Clichy
DM	18	Alou Diarra
CM	11	Samir Nasri		(substituted off) 77'
CM	17	Yann M'Vila		(substituted off) 83'
RW	20	Hatem Ben Arfa		(substituted off) 59'
LW	7	Franck Ribéry
CF	10	Karim Benzema
Substitutions:
MF	15	Florent Malouda		(substituted on) 59'
FW	14	Jérémy Ménez		(substituted on) 77'
FW	9	Olivier Giroud		(substituted on) 83'
Manager:
Laurent Blanc

Man of the Match:
Zlatan Ibrahimović (Sweden)

Assistant referees:
Bertino Miranda (Portugal)
Ricardo Santos (Portugal)
Fourth official:
Pol van Boekel (Netherlands)
Additional assistant referees:
Jorge Sousa (Portugal)
Duarte Gomes (Portugal)
Reserve assistant referee:
Roman Slyško (Slovakia)

== See also ==
- England at the UEFA European Championship
- France at the UEFA European Championship
- Sweden at the UEFA European Championship
- Ukraine at the UEFA European Championship
