= Maksym Kalynychenko =

Ukrainian footballer

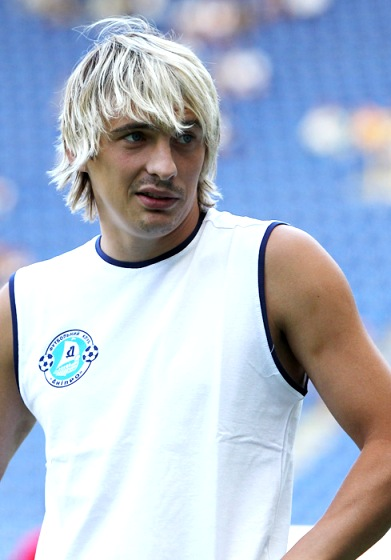
- Kalynychenko in 2010

Personal information
- Full name: Maksym Serhiyovych Kalynychenko
- Date of birth: 26 January 1979 (age 47)
- Place of birth: Kharkov, Soviet Union (now Kharkiv, Ukraine)
- Height: 1.76 m (5 ft 9 in)
- Position: Midfielder

Senior career*
| Years | Team | Apps | (Gls) |
| 1996–2000 | Dnipro Dnipropetrovsk | 45 | (7) |
| 1997–1999 | → Dnipro-2 Dnipropetrovsk | 22 | (2) |
| 2000–2008 | Spartak Moscow | 135 | (22) |
| 2008–2011 | Dnipro Dnipropetrovsk | 42 | (11) |
| 2011–2014 | Tavriya Simferopol | 52 | (9) |
| Total | | 296 | (51) |

International career
| 1999–2000 | Ukraine U21 | 9 | (1) |
| 2002–2011 | Ukraine | 47 | (7) |

Managerial career
- 2015–2016: Metalist Kharkiv (U21 assistant)
- 2016: Metalist Kharkiv (U21)
- 2017–2018: Polissya Zhytomyr (assistant)
- 2019–2020: Rodina Moscow (assistant)
- 2021: Riga (assistant)
- 2022: FCI Levadia Tallinn
- * Club domestic league appearances and goals

Maksym Serhiyovych Kalynychenko (Ukrainian: Максим Сергійович Калиниченко; born 26 January 1979) is a Ukrainian former football midfielder who played in central midfield or as a winger. Observers noted his pace, creativity, and accuracy in free kicks and penalties.

== Club career ==
=== Early years ===
Kalynychenko's father was a goalkeeper for an amateur side in Kharkiv, and the young Kalynychenko often acted as striker for his father to practise saves. He was enrolled in the Kharkiv Sportinternat, a sports boarding school where despite his smaller frame, tutors noted his tactical ability. The young Kalynychenko, like most of his family and friends, was a supporter of Dynamo Kyiv but was told jokingly that he played in the style of Dynamo's Soviet era rival 'Spartak Moscow'.

=== Dnipro Dnipropetrovsk ===
At the age of 17 Kalynychenko was talent-spotted by Dnipro Dnipropetrovsk coach Vyacheslav Hroznyi. Kalynychenko progressed to the first team within a year, and also made appearances for the Ukraine national under-21 football team. However, disputes with Dnipro management led to the dismissal of Hroznyi and several team members, including Kalynychenko. Following this Hroznyi and Kalynychenko migrated to Spartak Moscow.

=== Spartak Moscow ===
With Spartak Moscow, Kalynychenko has helped his team win the Russian Premier League Championship title in 2000 and 2001. His team was also runners-up for the Russian Premier League in 2005, 2006, and 2007, and got third place in the Russian league in 2002. Kalynychenko also won the Russian Cup in 2003, and was a runner-up in 2006.

Kalynychenko has overcome two injuries which have commonly signalled the end of footballers' careers: a torn cruciate ligament in his elbow, and a severed achilles tendon. These injuries, and the months spent in recovery, have dampened Kalynychenko's progress and placed him on the bench for long periods of 2005 and 2006. However, he is credited with having overcome these setbacks, steadily improving in skill since his comeback(s).

Despite being in his mid-twenties Kalynychenko is considered something of a veteran of Spartak and in the 2005 season was lauded for his penalty kicks taken from long distance, several times coming onto the field as a late substitute and changing the course of the game. Most recently, in the UEFA Champions League 2006 elimination rounds, Kalynychenko scored key goals in matches against Bayern Munich and Sporting Clube de Portugal, allowing Spartak to qualify for the UEFA Cup.

Kalynychenko was also voted the best Ukrainian left midfielder for 2006 by a poll in the press, one of 33 of a list of best Ukrainian footballers.

After capturing international attention for his World Cup 2006 debut, Kalynychenko was linked with clubs such as Manchester United, Valencia C.F., Borussia Dortmund and most recently, Wigan Athletic. He and Spartak Moscow management have since denied the existence of firm transfer offers in the Russian press. In the winter transfer window of 2006, after Kalynychenko expressed frustration at being left on the bench for long periods, concrete offers came through from Dynamo Kyiv and his former club Dnipro Dnipropetrovsk, with a price of 7 million Euros cited.

In August 2008, Maksym, along with teammate Egor Titov, was dismissed from Spartak after a conflict with manager Stanislav Cherchesov.

=== Return to Dnipro Dnipropetrovsk ===
On 6 August 2008, Kalynychenko signed a 3-year contract with his former club Dnipro Dnipropetrovsk on the rights of a free agent. He was given the shirt number 26.

After playing an away match on Saturday, 16 August 2008, against rivals Illychivets Mariupol during which Maksym Kalynychenko scored the winning goal in the 66th minute – helping Dnipro win 2:1, he was named by UA-Football as one of the two best attacking midfielders along with Constantinos Makrides of Metalurh Donetsk, of the fifth round in the Ukrainian Premier League.

== International ==
=== World Cup 2006 ===
Previous to the World Cup, Kalynychenko's appearances for a Russian club and lingering rumours surrounding his departure from Dnipro Dnipropetrovsk led to a low profile in Ukraine's senior national side. Kalynychenko did not feature in the 2006 qualification campaign, His surprise inclusion on the squad was due (by his own reckoning) to his good form in the tail end Spartak's 2005 season. In the run-up to Germany 2006, coach Oleh Blokhin played Kalynychenko in friendlies against Luxembourg, Costa Rica and Italy.

The player also did not feature in the first of Ukraine's proper World Cup games, in which the team were defeated 4–0 by Spain.

Called to the starting 11 in the next game against Saudi Arabia, Kalynychenko provided the opening assist from which Andriy Rusol scored Ukraine's first ever World Cup final goal. He set up another goal headed in by Andriy Shevchenko, who in turn fed Kalynychenko for the 4th and last goal of the game. Kalynychenko was named Man of the Match for his technical contributions. This game was the turning point for Ukraine, paving the way for their subsequent route to the quarter-finals.

Kalynychenko put in a notable performance in the quarter-final against Italy, with dangerous crosses and a shot on goal from a rebounded attempt by Oleh Husyev. However, none of these chances was converted and Ukraine bowed out of the tournament on a score of 3–0 to Italy.

In FIFA of Ukraine's debut, Kalynychenko was described as the 'revelation' of his team's World Cup campaign.

=== Euro 2008 Qualifying ===
Maksym Kalynychenko was a regular player in the Ukraine squad in the UEFA Euro 2008 qualifiers. He was called up to the team for almost every game, except for three. He also managed to score a goal in a 5–0 win over the Faroe Islands. However, Ukraine did not manage to qualify for the tournament, finishing fourth in its group, behind France, Italy, and Scotland.

== International goals ==
| No. | Date | Venue | Opponent | Score | Result | Competition |
|---|---|---|---|---|---|---|
| 1. | 12 April 2003 | Valeriy Lobanovskyi Dynamo Stadium, Lviv, Ukraine | Latvia | 1–0 | 1–0 | Friendly |
| 2. | 28 May 2006 | Olympic Stadium, Kyiv, Ukraine | Costa Rica | 3–0 | 4–0 | Friendly |
| 3. | 8 June 2006 | Stade Josy Barthel, Luxembourg City, Luxembourg | Luxembourg | 3–0 | 3–0 | Friendly |
| 4. | 19 June 2006 | Volksparkstadion, Hamburg, Germany | Saudi Arabia | 4–0 | 4–0 | 2006 FIFA World Cup |
| 5. | 7 February 2007 | Ramat Gan Stadium, Ramat Gan, Israel | Israel | 1–1 | 1–1 | Friendly |
| 6. | 17 October 2007 | Olympic Stadium, Kyiv, Ukraine | Faroe Islands | 1–0 | 5–0 | UEFA Euro 2008 qualifying |
| 7. | 17 October 2007 | Olympic Stadium, Kyiv, Ukraine | Faroe Islands | 4–0 | 5–0 | UEFA Euro 2008 qualifying |

== Personal life ==
Kalynychenko is married to Tetyana and they have one daughter, Oleksandra.
