= Russia at the FIFA World Cup =

International football delegation

Russia has participated in 4 FIFA World Cups since its independence in December 1991. The Russian Federation played their first international match against Mexico on 16 August 1992, winning 2–0. Their first participation in a World Cup was in the United States in 1994 where they achieved 18th place.

In 1946, the Soviet Union was accepted by FIFA and entered their first World Cup in Sweden 1958. The Soviet Union national football team played in 7 World Cups. Their best performance was reaching fourth place in England 1966. The USSR was dissolved in 1991 when Belarus, Russia and Ukraine declared independence under the Belavezha Accords, along with Georgia. The CIS national football team (Commonwealth of Independent States) was formed with other independent nations in 1992 for the purpose of competing in UEFA Euro 1992. Russia was recognized as the official successor of the Soviet Union by FIFA and inherited the records of the Soviet Union.

Russia most recently qualified for the 2018 edition as hosts. They were banned during qualification for the 2022 edition, and subsequently banned from any participation (including qualifying) in the 2026 edition. The last time Russia failed to qualify after a full qualification round was in 2010.

== Record at the FIFA World Cup ==
Champions Runners-up Third place Fourth Place

FIFA World Cup record									Qualification record						
Year	Round	Position	Pld	W	D*	L	GF	GA	Pld	W	D	L	GF	GA	Campaign
as Soviet Union									as Soviet Union						
(Uruguay) 1930	Not a FIFA member								Not a FIFA member						—
(Italy) 1934	Not a FIFA member								Not a FIFA member						1934
(France) 1938	Not a FIFA member								Not a FIFA member						1938
(Brazil) 1950	Did not enter								Did not enter						1950
(Switzerland) 1954	Did not enter								Did not enter						1954
(Sweden) 1958	Quarter-finals	6th	5	2	1	2	5	6	5	4	0	1	18	3	1958
(Chile) 1962	Quarter-finals	6th	4	2	1	1	9	7	4	4	0	0	11	3	1962
(England) 1966	Fourth place	4th	6	4	0	2	10	6	6	5	0	1	19	6	1966
(Mexico) 1970	Quarter-finals	5th	4	2	1	1	6	2	4	3	1	0	8	1	1970
(West Germany) 1974	Did not qualify								6	3	1	2	5	4	1974
(Argentina) 1978	Did not qualify								4	2	0	2	5	3	1978
(Spain) 1982	Second group stage	7th	5	2	2	1	7	4	8	6	2	0	20	2	1982
(Mexico) 1986	Round of 16	10th	4	2	1	1	12	5	8	4	2	2	13	8	1986
(Italy) 1990	Group stage	17th	3	1	0	2	4	4	8	4	3	1	11	4	1990
as Russia									as Russia						
(United States) 1994	Group stage	18th	3	1	0	2	7	6	8	5	2	1	15	4	1994
(France) 1998	Did not qualify								8	5	2	1	19	5	1998
(South Korea) (Japan) 2002	Group stage	22nd	3	1	0	2	4	4	10	7	2	1	18	5	2002
(Germany) 2006	Did not qualify								12	6	5	1	23	12	2006
(South Africa) 2010	Did not qualify								10	7	1	2	19	6	2010
(Brazil) 2014	Group stage	24th	3	0	2	1	2	3	10	7	1	2	20	5	2014
(Russia) 2018	Quarter-finals	8th	5	2	2	1	11	7	Qualified as hosts						2018
(Qatar) 2022	Banned during qualification								10	7	1	2	19	6	2022
(Canada) (Mexico) (United States) 2026	Banned from entering								Banned from entering						2026
(Morocco) (Portugal) (Spain) 2030	To be determined								To be determined						2030
(Saudi Arabia) 2034	To be determined								To be determined						2034
Total	Fourth place	11/22	45	19	10	16	77	54	125	80	24	21	246	81	Total

*Draws include knockout matches decided via penalty shoot-out

Russia's World Cup record
First Match	Soviet Union 2–2 England (8 June 1958; Gothenburg, Sweden)
Biggest Win	Soviet Union 6–0 Hungary (2 June 1986; Irapuato, Mexico)
Biggest Defeat	Uruguay 3–0 Russia (25 June 2018; Samara, Russia)
Best Result	Fourth place in 1966
Worst Result	Group stage in 1990, 1994, 2002 and 2014

== Soviet Union in Sweden 1958 ==
Team	Pld	W	D	L	GF	GA	GAv	Pts
Brazil	3	2	1	0	5	0	∞	5
Soviet Union	3	1	1	1	4	4	1.00	3
England	3	0	3	0	4	4	1.00	3
Austria	3	0	1	2	2	7	0.28	1

8 June 1958
19:00 CET

Soviet Union	2–2	England
Simonyan 13'; A. Ivanov 56'	(Report)	Kevan 66'; Finney 85' (pen.)

Ullevi, Gothenburg
Attendance: 49,348
Referee: Zsolt (Hungary)

11 June 1958
19:00 CET

Soviet Union	2–0	Austria
A. Ivanov 15'; V. Ivanov 62'	(Report)

Ryavallen, Borås
Attendance: 21,239
Referee: Jorgensen (Denmark)

15 June 1958
19:00 CET

Soviet Union	0–2	Brazil
	(Report)	Vavá 3', 77'

Ullevi, Gothenburg
Attendance: 50,928
Referee: Guigue (France)

=== Group play-off ===
17 June 1958
19:00 CET

Soviet Union	1–0	England
Ilyin 69'	(Report)

Ullevi, Gothenburg
Attendance: 23,182
Referee: Dusch (West Germany)

=== Quarter-final ===
19 June 1958
19:00 CET

Soviet Union	0–2	Sweden
	(Report)	Hamrin 49'; Simonsson 88'

Råsunda Stadium, Solna
Attendance: 45,000
Referee: Leafe (England)

== Soviet Union in Chile 1962 ==
Team	Pld	W	D	L	GF	GA	GAv	Pts
Soviet Union	3	2	1	0	8	5	1.60	5
Yugoslavia	3	2	0	1	8	3	2.67	4
Uruguay	3	1	0	2	4	6	0.67	2
Colombia	3	0	1	2	5	11	0.45	1

31 May 1962
15:00 CLT

Soviet Union	2–0	Yugoslavia
Ivanov 51'; Ponedelnik 83'	(Report)

Estadio Carlos Dittborn, Arica
Attendance: 15,000
Referee: Albert Dusch (West Germany)

3 June 1962
15:00 CLT

Soviet Union	4–4	Colombia
Ivanov 8', 11'; Chislenko 10'; Ponedelnik 56'	(Report)	Aceros 21'; Coll 68' (Olympic goal); Rada 72'; Klinger 86'

Estadio Carlos Dittborn, Arica
Attendance: 8,040
Referee: Joao Etzel Filho (Brazil)

6 June 1962
15:00 CLT

Soviet Union	2–1	Uruguay
Mamykin 38'; Ivanov 89'	(Report)	Sasía 54'

Estadio Carlos Dittborn, Arica
Attendance: 9,973
Referee: Casare Jonni (Italy)

=== Quarter-final ===
10 June 1962
14:30 CLT

Soviet Union	1–2	Chile
Chislenko 26'	(Report)	Sánchez 11'; Rojas 29'

Estadio Carlos Dittborn, Arica
Attendance: 17,268
Referee: Leo Horn (Netherlands)

== Soviet Union in England 1966 ==
Team	Pld	W	D	L	GF	GA	GAv	Pts
Soviet Union	3	3	0	0	6	1	6.00	6
North Korea	3	1	1	1	2	4	0.50	3
Italy	3	1	0	2	2	2	1.00	2
Chile	3	0	1	2	2	5	0.40	1

12 July 1966
19:30 BST

Soviet Union	3–0	North Korea
Malofeyev 31', 88'; Banishevskiy 33'	(Report)

Ayresome Park, Middlesbrough
Attendance: 22,000
Referee: Juan Gardeazábal Garay (Spain)

16 July 1966
15:00 BST

Soviet Union	1–0	Italy
Chislenko 57'	(Report)

Roker Park, Sunderland
Attendance: 27,800
Referee: Rudolf Kreitlein (West Germany)

20 July 1966
19:30 BST

Soviet Union	2–1	Chile
Porkujan 28', 85'	(Report)	Marcos 32'

Roker Park, Sunderland
Attendance: 22,000
Referee: John Adair (Northern Ireland)

=== Quarter-final ===
23 July 1966
15:00 BST

Soviet Union	2–1	Hungary
Chislenko 5'; Porkujan 46'	(Report)	Bene 57'

Roker Park, Sunderland
Attendance: 22,100
Referee: Juan Gardeazábal Garay (Spain)

=== Semi-final ===
25 July 1966
19:30 BST

Soviet Union	1–2	West Germany
Porkujan 88'	(Report)	Haller 42'; Beckenbauer 67'

Goodison Park, Liverpool
Attendance: 38,300
Referee: Concetto Lo Bello (Italy)

=== Match for third place ===
28 July 1966
19:30 BST

Soviet Union	1–2	Portugal
Malofeyev 43'	(Report)	Eusébio 12' (pen.); Torres 89'

Wembley Stadium, London
Attendance: 88,000
Referee: Ken Dagnall (England)

== Soviet Union in Mexico 1970 ==
Team	Pld	W	D	L	GF	GA	GD	Pts
Soviet Union	3	2	1	0	6	1	+5	5
Mexico	3	2	1	0	5	0	+5	5
Belgium	3	1	0	2	4	5	–1	2
El Salvador	3	0	0	3	0	9	–9	0

31 May 1970
12:00 CTZ

Mexico	0–0	Soviet Union
	(Report)

Estadio Azteca, Mexico City
Attendance: 107,000
Referee: Kurt Tschenscher (West Germany)

6 June 1970
16:00 CTZ

Soviet Union	4–1	Belgium
Byshovets 14', 63'; Asatiani 57'; Khmelnitsky 76'	(Report)	Lambert 86'

Estadio Azteca, Mexico City
Attendance: 59,000
Referee: Rudolf Scheurer (Switzerland)

10 June 1970
16:00 CTZ

Soviet Union	2–0	El Salvador
Byshovets 51', 74'	(Report)

Estadio Azteca, Mexico City
Attendance: 89,000
Referee: Rafael Hormazábal Díaz (Chile)

=== Quarter-final ===
14 June 1970
12:00 CTZ

Soviet Union	0–1 (a.e.t.)	Uruguay
	(Report)	Espárrago 116'

Estadio Azteca, Mexico City
Attendance: 24,550
Referee: Laurens van Ravens (Netherlands)

== Soviet Union in Spain 1982 ==
Team	Pld	W	D	L	GF	GA	GD	Pts
Brazil	3	3	0	0	10	2	+8	6
Soviet Union	3	1	1	1	6	4	+2	3
Scotland	3	1	1	1	8	8	0	3
New Zealand	3	0	0	3	2	12	–10	0

14 June 1982
21:15 CEST

Soviet Union	1–2	Brazil
Bal 34'	(Report)	Sócrates 75'; Éder 87'

Ramón Sánchez Pizjuán Stadium, Seville
Attendance: 68,000
Referee: Augusto Lamo Castillo (Spain)

19 June 1982
21:15 CEST

Soviet Union	3–0	New Zealand
Gavrilov 25'; Blokhin 48'; Baltacha 69'	(Report)

La Rosaleda Stadium, Málaga
Attendance: 19,000
Referee: Yousef Alghoul (Libya)

22 June 1982
21:15 CEST

Soviet Union	2–2	Scotland
Chivadze 60'; Shengelia 84'	(Report)	Jordan 15'; Souness 87'

La Rosaleda Stadium, Málaga
Attendance: 45,000
Referee: Nicolae Rainea (Romania)

=== Second round Group A ===
Team	Pld	W	D	L	GF	GA	GD	Pts
Poland	2	1	1	0	3	0	+3	3
Soviet Union	2	1	1	0	1	0	+1	3
Belgium	2	0	0	2	0	4	–4	0

1 July 1982
21:15 CEST

Soviet Union	1–0	Belgium
Hovhannisyan 48'	(Report)

Camp Nou, Barcelona
Attendance: 45,000
Referee: Michel Vautrot (France)

4 July 1982
21:15 CEST

Soviet Union	0–0	Poland
	(Report)

Camp Nou, Barcelona
Attendance: 65,000
Referee: Bob Valentine (Scotland)

== Soviet Union in Mexico 1986 ==
Team	Pld	W	D	L	GF	GA	GD	Pts
Soviet Union	3	2	1	0	9	1	+8	5
France	3	2	1	0	5	1	+4	5
Hungary	3	1	0	2	2	9	–7	2
Canada	3	0	0	3	0	5	–5	0

2 June 1986
12:00 CTZ

Soviet Union	6–0	Hungary
Yakovenko 2'; Aleinikov 4'; Belanov 24' (pen.); Yaremchuk 66'; Dajka 75' (o.g.); Rodionov 80'	(Report)

Estadio Sergio León Chavez, Irapuato
Attendance: 16,500
Referee: Luigi Agnolin (Italy)

5 June 1986
12:00 CTZ

Soviet Union	1–1	France
Rats 53'	(Report)	Fernández 60'

Estadio Nou Camp, León
Attendance: 36,500
Referee: Romualdo Arppi Filho (Brazil)

9 June 1986
12:00 CTZ

Soviet Union	2–0	Canada
Blokhin 58'; Zavarov 74'	(Report)

Estadio Sergio León Chavez, Irapuato
Attendance: 14,200
Referee: Idrissa Traoré (Mali)

=== Round of 16 ===
15 June 1986
16:00 CTZ

Soviet Union	3–4 (a.e.t.)	Belgium
Belanov 27', 70', 111' (pen.)	(Report)	Scifo 56'; Ceulemans 77'; Demol 102'; Claesen 110'

Estadio Nou Camp, León
Attendance: 32,300
Referee: Erik Fredriksson (Sweden)

== Soviet Union in Italy 1990 ==
Team	Pld	W	D	L	GF	GA	GD	Pts
Cameroon	3	2	0	1	3	5	–2	4
Romania	3	1	1	1	4	3	+1	3
Argentina	3	1	1	1	3	2	+1	3
Soviet Union	3	1	0	2	4	4	0	2

9 June 1990
17:00 CEST

Soviet Union	0–2	Romania
	(Report)	Lăcătuş 42', 57' (pen.)

Stadio San Nicola, Bari
Attendance: 42,907
Referee: Juan Daniel Cardellino (Uruguay)

13 June 1990
21:00 CEST

Soviet Union	0–2	Argentina
	(Report)	Troglio 27'; Burruchaga 79'

Stadio San Paolo, Naples
Attendance: 55,759
Referee: Erik Fredriksson (Sweden)

18 June 1990
21:00 CEST

Cameroon	0–4	Soviet Union
	(Report)	Protasov 20'; Zygmantovich 29'; Zavarov 55'; Dobrovolski 63'

Stadio San Nicola, Bari
Attendance: 37,307
Referee: José Roberto Wright (Brazil)

== Russia in the USA 1994 ==
Team	Pld	W	D	L	GF	GA	GD	Pts
Brazil	3	2	1	0	6	1	+5	7
Sweden	3	1	2	0	6	4	+2	5
Russia	3	1	0	2	7	6	+1	3
Cameroon	3	0	1	2	3	11	–8	1

20 June 1994
13:05 PDT

Brazil	2–0	Russia
Romário 26'; Raí 52' (pen.)	(Report)

Stanford Stadium, Stanford
Attendance: 81,061
Referee: Lim Kee Chong (Mauritius)

24 June 1994
19:35 EDT

Sweden	3–1	Russia
Brolin 37' (pen.); Dahlin 59', 81'	(Report)	Salenko 4' (pen.)

Pontiac Silverdome, Pontiac
Attendance: 71,528
Referee: Joël Quiniou (France)

28 June 1994
13:05 PDT

Russia	6–1	Cameroon
Salenko 15', 41', 44' (pen.), 72', 75'; Radchenko 81'	(Report)	Milla 46'

Stanford Stadium, Stanford
Attendance: 74,914
Referee: Jamal Al Sharif (Syria)

== Russia in South Korea/Japan 2002 ==
Legend
Group winners and runners-up advance to the round of 16

Team	Pld	W	D	L	GF	GA	GD	Pts
Japan	3	2	1	0	5	2	+3	7
Belgium	3	1	2	0	6	5	+1	5
Russia	3	1	0	2	4	4	0	3
Tunisia	3	0	1	2	1	5	–4	1

5 June 2002
15:30 JST

Russia	2–0	Tunisia
Titov 59'; Karpin 64' (pen.)	(Report)

Kobe Wing Stadium, Kobe
Attendance: 30,957
Referee: Peter Prendergast (Jamaica)

9 June 2002
20:30 JST

Russia	0–1	Japan
	(Report)	Inamoto 51'

International Stadium Yokohama, Yokohama
Attendance: 66,108
Referee: Markus Merk (Germany)

14 June 2002
15:30 JST

Russia	2–3	Belgium
Beschastnykh 52'; Sychev 88'	(Report)	Walem 7'; Sonck 78'; Wilmots 82'

Shizuoka Stadium, Fukuroi
Attendance: 46,640
Referee: Kim Milton Nielsen (Denmark)

== Russia in Brazil 2014 ==
Legend
Group winners and runners-up advance to the round of 16

Pos	Team	Pld	W	D	L	GF	GA	GD	Pts	Qualification
1	Belgium	3	3	0	0	4	1	+3	9	Advance to knockout stage
2	Algeria	3	1	1	1	6	5	+1	4	Advance to knockout stage
3	Russia	3	0	2	1	2	3	−1	2	
4	South Korea	3	0	1	2	3	6	−3	1	

Source: FIFA
Rules for classification: Tie-breaking criteria

=== Russia vs South Korea ===
This was the first time the two countries have played each other in the FIFA World Cup, though they did play a friendly in 2013, which Russia won 2–1. The match ended in a 1–1 draw, with both goals being in the second half.

17 June 2014
18:00 UTC−4

Russia	1–1	South Korea
Kerzhakov 74'	Report	Lee Keun-ho 68'

Arena Pantanal, Cuiabá
Attendance: 37,603
Referee: Néstor Pitana (Argentina)

Russia	South Korea

GK	1	Igor Akinfeev
RB	22	Andrey Yeshchenko
CB	4	Sergei Ignashevich
CB	14	Vasili Berezutski (c)
LB	23	Dmitri Kombarov
DM	8	Denis Glushakov		(substituted off) 72'
CM	20	Viktor Fayzulin
CM	18	Yuri Zhirkov		(substituted off) 71'
RW	19	Aleksandr Samedov
LW	17	Oleg Shatov	(yellow card) 49'	(substituted off) 59'
CF	9	Aleksandr Kokorin
Substitutions:
MF	10	Alan Dzagoev		(substituted on) 59'
FW	11	Aleksandr Kerzhakov		(substituted on) 71'
MF	7	Igor Denisov		(substituted on) 72'
Manager:
(Italy) Fabio Capello

GK	1	Jung Sung-ryong
RB	12	Lee Yong
CB	5	Kim Young-gwon
CB	20	Hong Jeong-ho		(substituted off) 73'
LB	3	Yun Suk-young
RM	17	Lee Chung-yong
CM	14	Han Kook-young
CM	16	Ki Sung-yueng	(yellow card) 30'
LM	9	Son Heung-min	(yellow card) 13'	(substituted off) 84'
CF	10	Park Chu-young		(substituted off) 56'
CF	13	Koo Ja-cheol (c)	(yellow card) 90'
Substitutions:
FW	11	Lee Keun-ho		(substituted on) 56'
DF	6	Hwang Seok-ho		(substituted on) 73'
MF	7	Kim Bo-kyung		(substituted on) 84'
Manager:
(South Korea) Hong Myung-bo

Man of the Match:
Son Heung-min (South Korea)

Assistant referees:
Hernán Maidana (Argentina)
Juan Pablo Belatti (Argentina)
Fourth official:
Roberto Moreno (Panama)
Fifth official:
Eric Boria (United States)

=== Belgium vs Russia ===
22 June 2014
13:00 UTC−3

Belgium	1–0	Russia
Origi 88'	Report

Estádio do Maracanã, Rio de Janeiro
Attendance: 73,819
Referee: Felix Brych (Germany)

Belgium	Russia

GK	1	Thibaut Courtois
RB	2	Toby Alderweireld	(yellow card) 73'
CB	15	Daniel Van Buyten
CB	4	Vincent Kompany (c)
LB	3	Thomas Vermaelen		(substituted off) 31'
CM	6	Axel Witsel	(yellow card) 54'
CM	8	Marouane Fellaini
RW	14	Dries Mertens		(substituted off) 75'
AM	7	Kevin De Bruyne
LW	10	Eden Hazard
CF	9	Romelu Lukaku		(substituted off) 57'
Substitutions:
DF	5	Jan Vertonghen		(substituted on) 31'
FW	17	Divock Origi		(substituted on) 57'
FW	11	Kevin Mirallas		(substituted on) 75'
Manager:
Marc Wilmots

GK	1	Igor Akinfeev
RB	2	Aleksei Kozlov		(substituted off) 62'
CB	14	Vasili Berezutski (c)
CB	4	Sergei Ignashevich
LB	23	Dmitri Kombarov
DM	8	Denis Glushakov	(yellow card) 38'
CM	20	Viktor Fayzulin
RW	19	Aleksandr Samedov		(substituted off) 90'
AM	6	Maksim Kanunnikov
LW	17	Oleg Shatov		(substituted off) 83'
CF	9	Aleksandr Kokorin
Substitutions:
DF	22	Andrey Yeshchenko		(substituted on) 62'
MF	10	Alan Dzagoev		(substituted on) 83'
FW	11	Aleksandr Kerzhakov		(substituted on) 90'
Manager:
(Italy) Fabio Capello

Man of the Match:
Eden Hazard (Belgium)

Assistant referees:
Mark Borsch (Germany)
Stefan Lupp (Germany)
Fourth official:
Carlos Vera (Ecuador)
Fifth official:
Byron Romero (Ecuador)

=== Algeria vs Russia ===
26 June 2014
17:00 UTC−3

Algeria	1–1	Russia
Slimani 60'	Report	Kokorin 6'

Arena da Baixada, Curitiba
Attendance: 39,311
Referee: Cüneyt Çakır (Turkey)

Algeria	Russia

GK	23	Raïs M'Bolhi
RB	20	Aïssa Mandi
CB	4	Essaïd Belkalem
CB	5	Rafik Halliche (c)
LB	6	Djamel Mesbah	(yellow card) 39'
CM	12	Carl Medjani
CM	14	Nabil Bentaleb
RW	10	Sofiane Feghouli
AM	11	Yacine Brahimi		(substituted off) 71'
LW	18	Abdelmoumene Djabou		(substituted off) 77'
CF	13	Islam Slimani		(substituted off) 90+2'
Substitutions:
MF	7	Hassan Yebda		(substituted on) 71'
FW	9	Nabil Ghilas	(yellow card) 87'	(substituted on) 77'
FW	15	Hillal Soudani		(substituted on) 90+2'
Other disciplinary actions:
DF	17	Cadamuro Bentaïba	(yellow card) 90+2' (Note: Despite not playing, Cadamuro received a yellow card on the bench.)
Manager:
(Bosnia and Herzegovina) Vahid Halilhodžić

GK	1	Igor Akinfeev
RB	2	Aleksei Kozlov	(yellow card) 59'
CB	14	Vasili Berezutski (c)
CB	4	Sergei Ignashevich
LB	23	Dmitri Kombarov	(yellow card) 57'
CM	8	Denis Glushakov		(substituted off) 46'
CM	20	Viktor Fayzulin
RW	19	Aleksandr Samedov
AM	9	Aleksandr Kokorin
LW	17	Oleg Shatov		(substituted off) 67'
CF	11	Aleksandr Kerzhakov		(substituted off) 81'
Substitutions:
MF	7	Igor Denisov		(substituted on) 46'
MF	10	Alan Dzagoev		(substituted on) 67'
FW	6	Maksim Kanunnikov		(substituted on) 81'
Manager:
(Italy) Fabio Capello

Man of the Match:
Islam Slimani (Algeria)

Assistant referees:
Bahattin Duran (Turkey)
Tarık Ongun (Turkey)
Fourth official:
Joel Aguilar (El Salvador)
Fifth official:
Juan Zumba (El Salvador)

== Russia in Russia 2018 ==
Legend
Group winners and runners-up advance to the round of 16

Pos	Team	Pld	W	D	L	GF	GA	GD	Pts	Qualification
1	Uruguay	3	3	0	0	5	0	+5	9	Advance to knockout stage
2	Russia (H)	3	2	0	1	8	4	+4	6	Advance to knockout stage
3	Saudi Arabia	3	1	0	2	2	7	−5	3	
4	Egypt	3	0	0	3	2	6	−4	0	

Source: FIFA
Rules for classification: Group stage tiebreakers
(H) Hosts
14 June 2018
18:00 UTC+3

Russia	5–0	Saudi Arabia
Gazinsky 12'; Cheryshev 43', 90+1'; Dzyuba 71'; Golovin 90+5'	Report

Luzhniki Stadium, Moscow
Attendance: 78,011
Referee: Néstor Pitana (Argentina)

19 June 2018
21:00 UTC+3

Russia	3–1	Egypt
Fathy 47' (o.g.); Cheryshev 59'; Dzyuba 62'	Report	Salah 73' (pen.)

Krestovsky Stadium, Saint Petersburg
Attendance: 64,468
Referee: Enrique Cáceres (Paraguay)

25 June 2018
18:00 UTC+4

Uruguay	3–0	Russia
Suárez 10'; Cheryshev 23' (o.g.); Cavani 90'	Report

Cosmos Arena, Samara
Attendance: 41,970
Referee: Malang Diedhiou (Senegal)

=== Knockout stage ===
Round of sixteen

1 July 2018
17:00 MSK (UTC+3)

Spain	1–1 (a.e.t.)	Russia
Ignashevich 12' (o.g.)	Report	Dzyuba 41' (pen.)
Penalties
Iniesta (penalty scored); Piqué (penalty scored); Koke (penalty missed); Ramos (penalty scored); Aspas (penalty missed)	3–4	(penalty scored) Smolov; (penalty scored) Ignashevich; (penalty scored) Golovin; (penalty scored) Cheryshev

Luzhniki Stadium, Moscow
Attendance: 78,011
Referee: Björn Kuipers (Netherlands)

Quarter-finals

7 July 2018
21:00 MSK (UTC+3)

Russia	2–2 (a.e.t.)	Croatia
Cheryshev 31'; Fernandes 115'		Kramarić 39'; Vida 101'
Penalties
Smolov (penalty missed); Dzagoev (penalty scored); Fernandes (penalty missed); Ignashevich (penalty scored); Kuzyayev (penalty scored)	3–4	(penalty scored) Brozović; (penalty missed) Kovačić; (penalty scored) Modrić; (penalty scored) Vida; (penalty scored) Rakitić

Fisht Olympic Stadium, Sochi
Attendance: 44,287
Referee: Sandro Ricci (Brazil)

== Player records ==
=== Most appearances ===
Russia's record World Cup player is Dynamo Moscow legend Lev Yashin. The 1958 FIFA World Cup in particular, which was the first one to be widely broadcast on television, had a major part in introducing Yashin's active and demanding goalkeeping style to the world at large. FIFA have established him as the best goalkeeper of the 20th century by repeatedly naming him in all-star teams like the FIFA World Cup Dream Team in 2002.

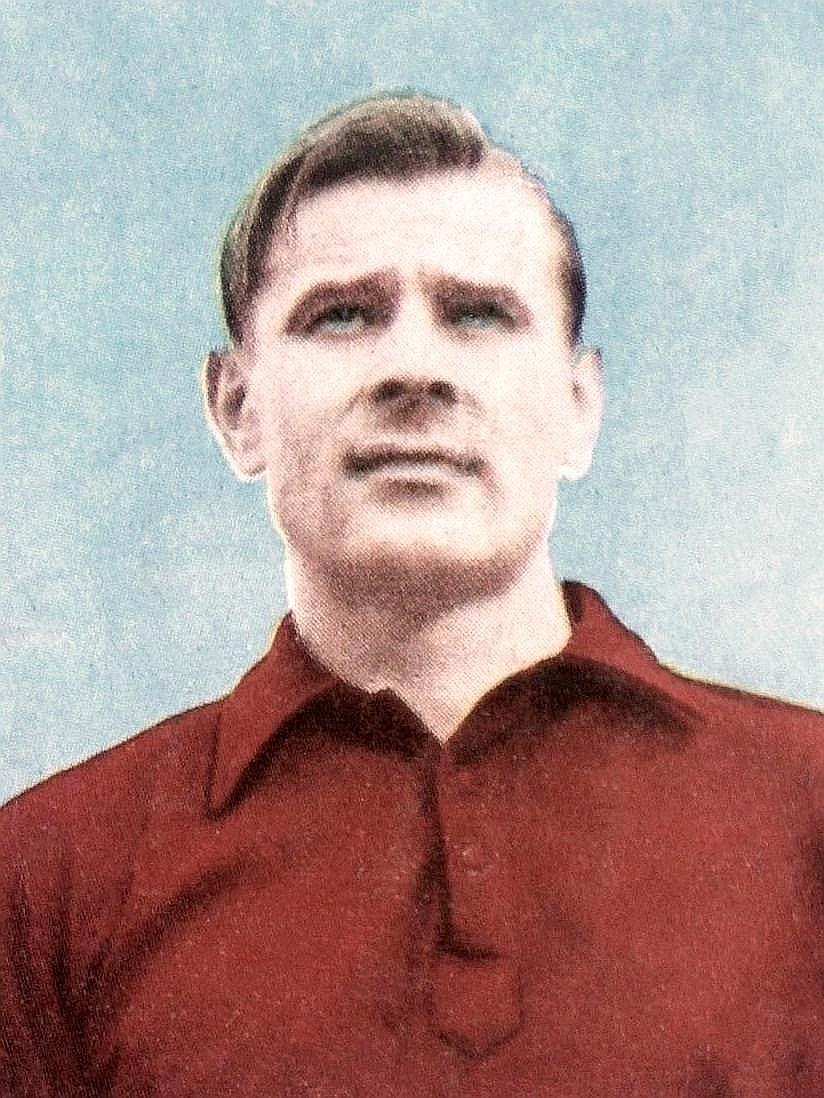
Goalkeeper Lev Yashin (here in 1966) participated in three World Cups, and remains Russia's record World Cup appearance maker.

Rank	Player	Matches	World Cups
1	Lev Yashin	13	1958, 1962 and 1966
2	Volodymyr Bezsonov	10	1982, 1986 and 1990
3	Valentin Ivanov	9	1958 and 1962
3	Valery Voronin	9	1962 and 1966
3	Albert Shesternyov	9	1966 and 1970
3	Rinat Dasayev	9	1982, 1986 and 1990
3	Anatoliy Demyanenko	9	1982, 1986 and 1990
3	Oleh Kuznetsov	9	1986 and 1990
9	Igor Akinfeev	8	2014 and 2018
9	Sergei Ignashevich	8	2014 and 2018
9	Aleksandr Samedov	8	2014 and 2018

=== Top goalscorers ===
Russia's top goalscorers at the FIFA World Cup, Valentin Ivanov and Oleg Salenko, both won a Golden Boot award. Salenko is the only player who has ever scored five goals in a single World Cup match, and the only player to win the Golden Boot even though his team was eliminated in the group stage.

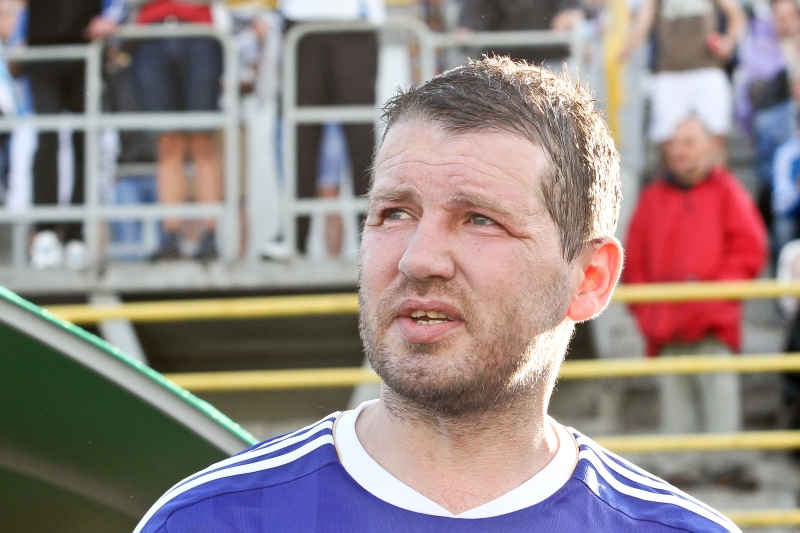
Oleg Salenko scored all of his six international goals at the 1994 FIFA World Cup, five of them in a single match against Cameroon.

Rank	Player	Goals	World Cups
1	Oleg Salenko	6	1994
2	Valentin Ivanov	5	1958 (1) and 1962 (4)
3	Igor Chislenko	4	1962 (2) and 1966 (2)
3	Valeriy Porkuyan	4	1966
3	Anatoliy Byshovets	4	1970
3	Igor Belanov	4	1986
3	Denis Cheryshev	4	2018
8	Eduard Malofeyev	3	1966
8	Artem Dzyuba	3	2018
10	Aleksandr Ivanov	2	1958
10	Viktor Ponedelnik	2	1962
10	Oleh Blokhin	2	1982 and 1986
10	Oleksandr Zavarov	2	1986 and 1990

== See also ==
- Russia at the FIFA Confederations Cup
- Russia at the UEFA European Championship

=== Former Soviet states ===
- Ukraine at the FIFA World Cup
- Uzbekistan at the FIFA World Cup

== Head-to-head record ==
=== As Soviet Union ===
Opponent	Pld	W	D	L	GF	GA	GD	Win %
Argentina	1	0	0	1	0	2	−2	0.00
Austria	1	1	0	0	2	0	+2	100.00
Belgium	3	2	0	1	8	5	+3	66.67
Brazil	2	0	0	2	1	4	−3	0.00
Cameroon	1	1	0	0	4	0	+4	100.00
Canada	1	1	0	0	2	0	+2	100.00
Chile	2	1	0	1	3	3	+0	50.00
Colombia	1	0	1	0	4	4	+0	0.00
El Salvador	1	1	0	0	2	0	+2	100.00
England	2	1	1	0	3	2	+1	50.00
France	1	0	1	0	1	1	+0	0.00
Hungary	2	2	0	0	8	1	+7	100.00
Italy	1	1	0	0	1	0	+1	100.00
Mexico	1	0	1	0	0	0	+0	0.00
New Zealand	1	1	0	0	3	0	+3	100.00
North Korea	1	1	0	0	3	0	+3	100.00
Poland	1	0	1	0	0	0	+0	0.00
Portugal	1	0	0	1	1	2	−1	0.00
Romania	1	0	0	1	0	2	−2	0.00
Scotland	1	0	1	0	2	2	+0	0.00
Sweden	1	0	0	1	0	2	−2	0.00
Uruguay	2	1	0	1	2	2	+0	50.00
West Germany	1	0	0	1	1	2	−1	0.00
Yugoslavia	1	1	0	0	2	0	+2	100.00
Total	31	15	6	10	53	34	+19	48.39

=== As Russia ===
Opponent	Pld	W	D	L	GF	GA	GD	Win %
Algeria	1	0	1	0	1	1	+0	0.00
Belgium	2	0	0	2	2	4	−2	0.00
Brazil	1	0	0	1	0	2	−2	0.00
Cameroon	1	1	0	0	6	1	+5	100.00
Croatia	1	0	1	0	2	2	+0	0.00
Egypt	1	1	0	0	3	1	+2	100.00
Japan	1	0	0	1	0	1	−1	0.00
Saudi Arabia	1	1	0	0	5	0	+5	100.00
South Korea	1	0	1	0	1	1	+0	0.00
Spain	1	0	1	0	1	1	+0	0.00
Sweden	1	0	0	1	1	3	−2	0.00
Tunisia	1	1	0	0	2	0	+2	100.00
Uruguay	1	0	0	1	0	3	−3	0.00
Total	14	4	4	6	24	20	+4	28.57
