= Uzbekistan at the AFC Asian Cup =

Uzbekistan is one of the most successful football teams in Asia, and the most successful team in Central Asia, having qualified for every AFC Asian Cup since the fall of the Soviet Union. Their best performance was a fourth place finish in the 2011 tournament.

== Asian Cup record ==
AFC Asian Cup record									Qualification record					
Year	Result	Position	Pld	W	D*	L	GF	GA	Pld	W	D*	L	GF	GA
(Hong Kong) 1956 to (Qatar) 1988	Part of the Soviet Union								Part of the Soviet Union					
(Japan) 1992	Not an AFC member								Not an AFC member					
(United Arab Emirates) 1996	Group stage	10th	3	1	0	2	3	6	2	1	0	1	5	4
(Lebanon) 2000	Group stage	12th	3	0	1	2	2	14	4	4	0	0	16	2
(China) 2004	Quarter-finals	6th	4	3	1	0	5	2	6	4	1	1	13	6
(Indonesia) (Malaysia) (Thailand) (Vietnam) 2007	Quarter-finals	7th	4	2	0	2	10	4	6	3	2	1	14	4
(Qatar) 2011	Fourth place	4th	6	3	1	2	10	13	4	3	0	1	7	3
(Australia) 2015	Quarter-finals	8th	4	2	0	2	5	5	6	3	2	1	10	4
(United Arab Emirates) 2019	Round of 16	10th	4	2	1	1	7	3	8	7	0	1	20	7
(Qatar) 2023	Quarter-finals	5th	5	2	3	0	7	3	11	8	0	3	27	9
(Saudi Arabia) 2027	Qualified								6	4	2	0	13	4
Total	9/9	Fourth place	33	15	7	11	49	50	53	37	7	9	125	43

== 1996 Asian Cup in the UAE ==
It was Uzbekistan's first ever appearance in the AFC Asian Cup, since the demise of USSR. In the tournament, although being regarded as the weakest team, Uzbekistan surprised all predictions by defeating China 2–0 right on their opening account. Uzbekistan, however, lost two remaining matches to Japan and Syria, thus had to end up in the group stage. Uzbekistan's maiden victory over China, however, remained as the biggest achievement for Uzbekistan before 2004.

=== Group C ===
Team	Pts	Pld	W	D	L	GF	GA	GD
Japan	9	3	3	0	0	7	1	+6
China	3	3	1	0	2	3	3	0
Syria	3	3	1	0	2	3	6	−3
Uzbekistan	3	3	1	0	2	3	6	−3

6 December 1996
19:00

China	0–2	Uzbekistan
	Report	Shkvyrin 78'; Shatskikh 90'

Tahnoun Bin Mohamed Stadium, Al Ain
Attendance: 3,000
Referee: Abdul Rahman Al-Zeid (Saudi Arabia)

9 December 1996
16:45

Japan	4–0	Uzbekistan
Nanami 7'; Miura 37'; Maezono 86', 90'	Report

Tahnoun Bin Mohamed Stadium, Al Ain
Attendance: 3,000
Referee: Jalal Moradi (Iran)

12 December 1996
19:00

Uzbekistan	1–2	Syria
Lebedev 53' (pen.)	Report	Jokhadar 48'; Dib 74'

Tahnoun Bin Mohamed Stadium, Al Ain
Attendance: 2,000
Referee: Ali Bujsaim (United Arab Emirates)

== 2000 Asian Cup in Lebanon ==
Uzbekistan made their second appearance by participating in the 2000 edition held in Lebanon. However, this would have become Uzbekistan's worst performance in their history, drew just one and lost two matches, both were humiliating 1–8 and 0–5 demolitions on the hand of Japan and Saudi Arabia.

=== Group C ===
Team	Pts	Pld	W	D	L	GF	GA	GD
Japan	7	3	2	1	0	13	3	+10
Saudi Arabia	4	3	1	1	1	6	4	+2
Qatar	3	3	0	3	0	2	2	0
Uzbekistan	1	3	0	1	2	2	14	−12

14 October 2000
19:45

Qatar	1–1	Uzbekistan
Gholam 61'	Report	Qosimov 73'

Saida Municipal Stadium, Sidon
Attendance: 5,000
Referee: Mohd Nazri Abdullah (Malaysia)

17 October 2000
17:00

Japan	8–1	Uzbekistan
Morishima 7'; Nishizawa 14', 25', 49'; Takahara 18', 20', 57'; Kitajima 79'	Report	Lushan 29'

Saida Municipal Stadium, Sidon
Attendance: 2,000
Referee: Shamsul Maidin (Singapore)

20 October 2000
19:30

Saudi Arabia	5–0	Uzbekistan
Al-Otaibi 18'; Al-Shalhoub 35', 78', 86'; Al-Temyat 88'	Report

Saida Municipal Stadium, Sidon
Attendance: 2,000
Referee: Kim Young-Joo (South Korea)

== 2004 Asian Cup in China ==
Uzbekistan participated in the Asian Cup 2004 held in China, and it would have marked their historical milestones. The White Wolves was drawn with neighboring Turkic Turkmenistan, and two Arab teams Iraq and Saudi Arabia, the latter was the runners-up last edition. Uzbekistan, however, performed better than expected. Uzbekistan defeated all three teams with the result 1–0, to qualify for the knockout stage first time, and also the only time they topped group with full nine points. The White Wolves had to end their journey after losing to Bahrain in a penalty shootout.

=== Group C ===
Team	Pts	Pld	W	D	L	GF	GA	GD
Uzbekistan	9	3	3	0	0	3	0	+3
Iraq	6	3	2	0	1	5	4	+1
Turkmenistan	1	3	0	1	2	4	6	−2
Saudi Arabia	1	3	0	1	2	3	5	−2

18 July 2004
21:15

Iraq	0–1	Uzbekistan
	Report	Qosimov 21'

Chengdu Longquanyi Football Stadium, Chengdu
Attendance: 12,400
Referee: Kwon Jong-chul (South Korea)

22 July 2004
21:00

Uzbekistan	1–0	Saudi Arabia
Geynrikh 13'	Report

Chengdu Longquanyi Football Stadium, Chengdu
Attendance: 22,000
Referee: Coffi Codjia (Benin)

26 July 2004
19:00

Turkmenistan	0–1	Uzbekistan
	Report	Qosimov 58'

Chongqing Olympic Sports Center, Chongqing
Attendance: 34,000
Referee: Mohammed Kousa (Syria)

=== Quarter-finals ===
30 July 2004
18:00

Uzbekistan	2–2 (a.e.t.)	Bahrain
Geynrikh 60'; Shishelov 86'	Report	A. Hubail 71', 76'
Penalties
Fyodorov (penalty scored); Djeperov (penalty scored); Geynrikh (penalty scored); Bikmoev (penalty missed); Koshelev (penalty missed)	3–4	(penalty scored) Ali; (penalty missed) Juma; (penalty scored) Baba; (penalty scored) Farhan; (penalty scored) A. Hubail

Chengdu Longquanyi Football Stadium, Chengdu
Attendance: 18,000
Referee: Kwon Jong-chul (South Korea)

== 2007 Asian Cup in Indonesia/Malaysia/Thailand/Vietnam ==
Uzbekistan would have continued their participation by placing themselves in Group C together with host Malaysia, latest runners-up China and giant Iran. Having been drawn into a tough group with only Malaysia as a point basket, very few people expected Uzbekistan to do something but three points. Uzbekistan eventually lost 1–2 in their opening account against Iran, before winning against Malaysia 5–0. However, in the last match against China, Uzbekistan successfully won 3-0 in 1996 against China. This surprising victory enabled Uzbekistan to the quarter-finals twice while eliminated China from the tournament.

In the quarter-finals, Uzbekistan once again lost to another Arab team, this time, to Saudi Arabia, after 90 minutes with a 1–2 loss and had to go home.

=== Group C ===
Team	Pld	W	D	L	GF	GA	GD	Pts
Iran	3	2	1	0	6	3	+3	7
Uzbekistan	3	2	0	1	9	2	+7	6
China	3	1	1	1	7	6	+1	4
Malaysia	3	0	0	3	1	12	−11	0

11 July 2007
18:15 UTC+8

Iran	2–1	Uzbekistan
Hosseini 55'; Kazemian 78'	Report	Rezaei 16' (o.g.)

Bukit Jalil Stadium, Kuala Lumpur
Attendance: 1,863
Referee: Saad Kamil Al-Fadhli (Kuwait)

14 July 2007
18:15 UTC+8

Uzbekistan	5–0	Malaysia
Shatskikh 10', 89'; Kapadze 30'; Bakayev 45+2' (pen.); Ibrahimov 85'	Report

Bukit Jalil Stadium, Kuala Lumpur
Attendance: 7,137
Referee: Abdulrahman Abdou (Qatar)

18 July 2007
20:30 UTC+8

Uzbekistan	3–0	China
Shatskikh 72'; Kapadze 86'; Geynrikh 90+4'	Report

Shah Alam Stadium, Shah Alam
Attendance: 2,200
Referee: Saad Kamil Al-Fadhli (Kuwait)

=== Quarter-finals ===
22 July 2007
20:15 UTC+7

Saudi Arabia	2–1	Uzbekistan
Y. Al-Qahtani 3'; Al-Mousa 75'	Report	Solomin 82'

Gelora Bung Karno Stadium, Jakarta
Attendance: 12,000
Referee: Kwon Jong-Chul (South Korea)

== 2011 Asian Cup in Qatar ==
Uzbekistan's participation in the 2011 edition was considered as the most successful to date. Placing in group A with host Qatar, old rival China and Kuwait, the Uzbeks showed to be tough when they beat host Qatar 2–0 and Kuwait 2–1. Although could not repeat the feat of four years ago with China when they drew 2–2, Uzbekistan was still able to qualify into the quarter-finals. In there, Uzbekistan for the first time, to win a match in the knockout round, beating another fellow underdog Jordan 2–1. However, Uzbekistan's semi-final match would have turned to be a nightmare when they lost 0–6 to Australia, shattered their dream to go for their maiden final. In the third place match, Uzbekistan continued losing 2–3 to South Korea, and got their best ever position in Asian Cup history: fourth place.

=== Group A ===
Team	Pld	W	D	L	GF	GA	GD	Pts
Uzbekistan	3	2	1	0	6	3	+3	7
Qatar	3	2	0	1	5	2	+3	6
China	3	1	1	1	4	4	0	4
Kuwait	3	0	0	3	1	7	−6	0

7 January 2011
Qatar	0–2	Uzbekistan
12 January 2011
Uzbekistan	2–1	Kuwait
16 January 2011
China	2–2	Uzbekistan

=== Quarter-finals ===
21 January 2011
19:30

Uzbekistan	2–1	Jordan
Bakayev 47', 49'	Report	B. Bani Yaseen 58'

Khalifa International Stadium, Doha
Attendance: 16,073
Referee: Malik Abdul Bashir (Singapore)

=== Semi-finals ===
25 January 2011
19:30

Uzbekistan	0–6	Australia
	Report	Kewell 5'; Ognenovski 35'; Carney 65'; Emerton 73'; Valeri 82'; Kruse 83'

Khalifa International Stadium, Doha
Attendance: 24,826
Referee: Ali Al Badwawi (United Arab Emirates)

=== Third place play-off ===
28 January 2011
18:00

Uzbekistan	2–3	South Korea
Geynrikh 45' (pen.), 53'	Report	Koo Ja-Cheol 18'; Ji Dong-Won 28', 39'

Jassim Bin Hamad Stadium, Doha
Attendance: 8,199
Referee: Malik Abdul Bashir (Singapore)

== 2015 Asian Cup in Australia ==
Their participation in 2015 Asian Cup was not considered to be too successful. Uzbekistan, placed with North Korea, China and Saudi Arabia, was expected to make up into the semi-finals. Uzbekistan, said, needed to play all three matches to secure their ticket to the knockout stage. First, they beat North Korea 1–0 but they lost to China, for the first time in the Asian Cup, 1–2, despite had taken the lead. Uzbekistan had to fight hard to win 3–1 over Saudi Arabia, eventually booked their ticket to the knockout stage facing South Korea.

In the match against South Korea, a rematch of the previous edition's third place-playoff, the Uzbeks were more resilience, and goalkeeper Ignatiy Nesterov had played an astonishing match to hold off South Korea and bring the match to extra time. The Koreans proved to be stronger when they scored two goals, effectively eliminating an Uzbekistan side that had shown great strength from the tournament.

=== Group B ===
Pos	Team	Pld	W	D	L	GF	GA	GD	Pts	Qualification
1	China	3	3	0	0	5	2	+3	9	Advance to knockout stage
2	Uzbekistan	3	2	0	1	5	3	+2	6	Advance to knockout stage
3	Saudi Arabia	3	1	0	2	5	5	0	3	
4	North Korea	3	0	0	3	2	7	−5	0	

Source: Asian Cup Australia 2015
Rules for classification: Tiebreakers

10 January 2015
Uzbekistan	1–0	North Korea	Stadium Australia, Sydney
14 January 2015
China	2–1	Uzbekistan	Brisbane Stadium, Brisbane
18 January 2015
Uzbekistan	3–1	Saudi Arabia	AAMI Park, Melbourne

=== Quarter-finals ===
22 January 2015
18:30 AEDT (UTC+11)

South Korea	2–0 (a.e.t.)	Uzbekistan
Son Heung-min 104', 120'	Report

AAMI Park, Melbourne
Attendance: 23,381
Referee: Fahad Al-Mirdasi (Saudi Arabia)

== 2019 Asian Cup in the UAE ==
Uzbekistan joined group F with Japan, Oman and 2004 rival, neighboring Turkmenistan. For the Uzbeks, they were looking for their maiden final, and Uzbekistan's successful victory in 2018 AFC U-23 Championship was believed to be the boost for the White Wolves in such a tough group.

Under guidance of Héctor Cúper, who coached Egypt in the 2018 FIFA World Cup, Uzbekistan won against Oman and Turkmenistan, their first two matches, before falling to Japan in the last match that saw Uzbekistan occupied second place in the group. Thus, the defeat to Japan forced Uzbekistan to face Australia, whom they lost disastrously 0–6 eight years ago and also the champions of previous edition. This time, Uzbekistan played better and more organized, thus forcing the match into penalty shootout, but Australia eventually overcame the White Wolves 4–2, thus ended Uzbekistan's campaign in sad note.

=== Group F ===
Pos	Team	Pld	W	D	L	GF	GA	GD	Pts	Qualification
1	Japan	3	3	0	0	6	3	+3	9	Advance to knockout stage
2	Uzbekistan	3	2	0	1	7	3	+4	6	Advance to knockout stage
3	Oman	3	1	0	2	4	4	0	3	Advance to knockout stage
4	Turkmenistan	3	0	0	3	3	10	−7	0	

Source: AFC
9 January 2019
17:30

Uzbekistan	2–1	Oman
Ahmedov 34'; Shomurodov 85'	Report	Mu. Al-Ghassani 72'

Sharjah Stadium, Sharjah
Attendance: 9,424
Referee: Ko Hyung-jin (South Korea)

13 January 2019
20:00

Turkmenistan	0–4	Uzbekistan
	Report	Sidikov 17'; Shomurodov 24', 42'; Masharipov 40'

Rashid Stadium, Dubai
Attendance: 4,354
Referee: Ammar Al-Jeneibi (United Arab Emirates)

17 January 2019
17:30

Japan	2–1	Uzbekistan
Muto 43'; Shiotani 58'	Report	Shomurodov 40'

Khalifa bin Zayed Stadium, Al Ain
Attendance: 7,005
Referee: Mohammed Abdulla Hassan Mohamed (United Arab Emirates)

=== Round of 16 ===
21 January 2019
18:00

Australia	0–0 (a.e.t.)	Uzbekistan
	Report
Penalties
Milligan (penalty scored); Behich (penalty missed); Kruse (penalty scored); Giannou (penalty scored); Leckie (penalty scored)	4–2	(penalty scored) Shukurov; (penalty missed) Tukhtakhodjaev; (penalty scored) Alibaev; (penalty missed) Bikmaev

Khalifa bin Zayed Stadium, Al Ain
Attendance: 6,809
Referee: Abdulrahman Al-Jassim (Qatar)

== 2023 Asian Cup in Qatar ==
=== Group B ===
Pos	Team	Pld	W	D	L	GF	GA	GD	Pts	Qualification
1	Australia	3	2	1	0	4	1	+3	7	Advance to knockout stage
2	Uzbekistan	3	1	2	0	4	1	+3	5	Advance to knockout stage
3	Syria	3	1	1	1	1	1	0	4	Advance to knockout stage
4	India	3	0	0	3	0	6	−6	0	

Source: AFC
13 January 2024
20:30

Uzbekistan	0–0	Syria
	Report

Jassim bin Hamad Stadium, Al Rayyan
Attendance: 10,198
Referee: Ahmed Al-Kaf (Oman)

18 January 2024
17:30

India	0–3	Uzbekistan
	Report	Fayzullaev 4'; Sergeev 18'; Nasrullaev 45+4'

Ahmad bin Ali Stadium, Al Rayyan
Attendance: 38,491
Referee: Fu Ming (China)

23 January 2024
14:30

Australia	1–1	Uzbekistan
Boyle 45+1' (pen.)	Report	Turgunboev 78'

Al Janoub Stadium, Al Wakrah
Attendance: 15,290
Referee: Yusuke Araki (Japan)

=== Knockout stage ===
==== Round of 16 ====
30 January 2024
14:30

Uzbekistan	2–1	Thailand
Turgunboev 37'; Fayzullaev 65'	Report	Supachok 58'

Al Janoub Stadium, Al Wakrah
Attendance: 18,691
Referee: Nazmi Nasaruddin (Malaysia)

==== Quarter-finals ====
3 February 2024
18:30

Qatar	1–1 (a.e.t.)	Uzbekistan
Al-Haydos 27'	Report	Hamrobekov 59'
Penalties
Afif (penalty scored); Ali (penalty missed); Mukhtar (penalty missed); Al-Brake (penalty scored); Ró-Ró (penalty scored)	3–2	(penalty scored) Shukurov; (penalty missed) Ashurmatov; (penalty scored) Umarov; (penalty missed) Abdurakhmatov; (penalty missed) Masharipov

Al Bayt Stadium, Al Khor
Attendance: 58,791
Referee: Kim Hee-gon (South Korea)

== Head-to-head record ==
Opponent	Pld	W	D	L	GF	GA	GD	Win %
Australia	3	0	2	1	1	7	−6	0.00
Bahrain	1	0	1	0	2	2	+0	0.00
China	4	2	1	1	8	4	+4	50.00
India	1	1	0	0	3	0	+3	100.00
Iran	1	0	0	1	1	2	−1	0.00
Iraq	1	1	0	0	1	1	+0	100.00
Japan	3	0	0	3	2	14	−12	0.00
Jordan	1	1	0	0	2	1	+1	100.00
Kuwait	1	1	0	0	2	1	+1	100.00
Malaysia	1	1	0	0	5	0	+5	100.00
North Korea	1	1	0	0	1	0	+1	100.00
Oman	1	1	0	0	2	1	+1	100.00
Qatar	3	1	2	0	4	2	+2	33.33
Saudi Arabia	4	2	0	2	5	8	−3	50.00
South Korea	2	0	0	2	2	5	−3	0.00
Syria	2	0	1	1	1	2	−1	0.00
Thailand	1	1	0	0	2	1	+1	100.00
Turkmenistan	2	2	0	0	5	0	+5	100.00
Total	33	15	7	11	49	50	−1	45.45
