= Andriy Rusol =

Ukrainian footballer (born 1983)

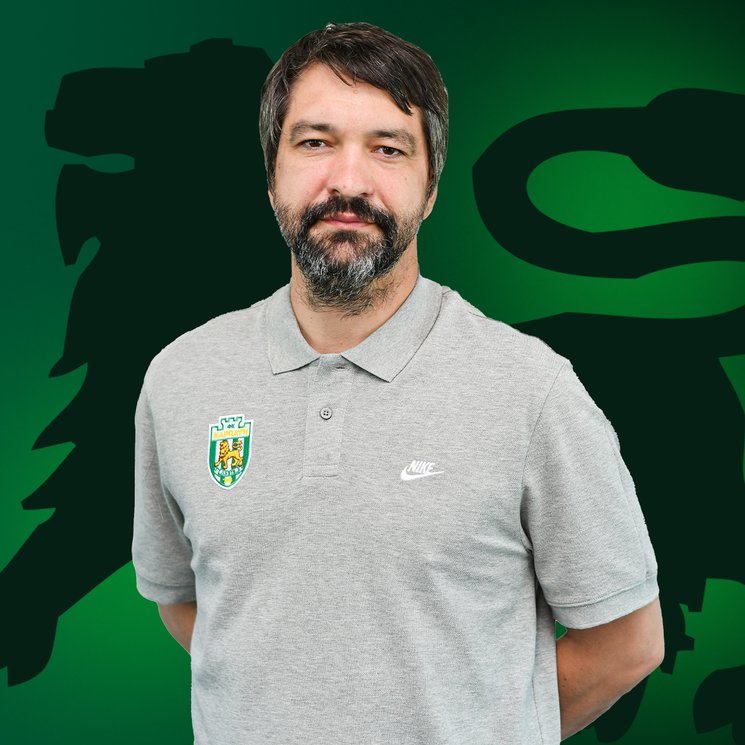

Personal information
- Full name: Andriy Anatoliyovych Rusol
- Date of birth: 16 January 1983 (age 43)
- Place of birth: Kirovohrad, Ukrainian SSR, USSR
- Height: 1.86 m (6 ft 1 in)
- Position: Defender

Team information
- Current team: SC Dnipro-1 (executive director)

Youth career
- 1997–1998: Zirka Kirovohrad

Senior career*
Years	Team	Apps	(Gls)
1998–1999	Zirka Kirovohrad	1	(0)
1998–1999	→ Zirka-2 Kirovohrad	9	(0)
1999–2003	Kryvbas Kryvyi Rih	40	(0)
2000	→ Kryvbas-2 Kryvyi Rih	23	(0)
2003–2011	Dnipro Dnipropetrovsk	211	(9)
2003	→ Dnipro-2 Dnipropetrovsk	8	(0)
Total		292	(9)

International career
2003	Ukraine U21	1	(0)
2004–2011	Ukraine	49	(3)

Managerial career
- 2011–2012: Dnipro Dnipropetrovsk (scout)
- 2012–2018: Dnipro (executive director)
- 2019–: Dnipro-1 (executive director)
- * Club domestic league appearances and goals

Andriy Anatoliyovych Rusol (Ukrainian: Андрі́й Анато́лійович Ру́сол; born 16 January 1983) is a Ukrainian retired footballer who formerly played as a defender for Dnipro Dnipropetrovsk and the Ukraine national team.

== Club career ==
Andrii was a defender. He started his career with Zirka Kirovohrad in the 1998–99 season. He then transferred to Kryvbas Kryvyi Rih for the 1999–2000 season. He played for Kryvbas until 2003, when he was transferred to Dnipro Dnipropetrovsk. He played 117 matches for Dnipro and scored 5 goals. In the 2007–08 season, Rusol became the captain of Dnipro. He retired on 24 August 2011 due to back injuries, aged 28.

== International career ==
Andrii made his debut for Ukraine on 31 March 2004. Since then, he has played 49 matches and scored 3 goals.

Andrii also scored Ukraine's first World Cup finals goal in the 4th minute against Saudi Arabia in the 2006 World Cup. Recently, he was the captain against Sweden and beat them 1–0.

== Career statistics ==
=== International ===
Appearances and goals by national team and year
National team	Year	Apps	Goals
Ukraine	2004	9	0
Ukraine	2005	9	1
Ukraine	2006	13	2
Ukraine	2007	8	0
Ukraine	2008	4	0
Ukraine	2009	4	0
Ukraine	2010	2	0
Total		49	3

Scores and results list Ukraine's goal tally first, score column indicates score after each Rusol goal.

List of international goals scored by Andriy Rusol
No.	Date	Venue	Opponent	Score	Result	Competition	Ref.
1	9 February 2005	Arena Kombëtare, Tirana, Albania	Albania	1–0	2–0	2006 FIFA World Cup qualification	
2	19 June 2006	AOL Arena, Hamburg, Germany	Saudi Arabia	1–0	4–0	2006 FIFA World Cup	
3	6 September 2006	Olympic Stadium, Kyiv, Ukraine	Georgia	3–2	3–2	UEFA Euro 2008 qualifying	
