= My House =

My House may refer to:

== Film and TV ==
- My House (film), a 2003 Japanese drama film
- "My House", episode 121 of Scrubs
- My House (2015 TV program), a South Korean TV series
- My House (2018 TV Series), an American TV series

== Music ==
- My House (album), a 2012 album by Oceana
- My House (EP), a 2015 EP by Flo Rida, or its title track
  - "My House" (Flo Rida song)
- "My House" (2PM song), 2015
- "My House" (Beyoncé song), 2023
- "My House" (Elderbrook song), 2020
- "My House" (Jodie Harsh song), 2021
- "My House" (Kids of 88 song), 2009
- "My House" (Warren G song), 2015
- "My House", a song by Big Sean from the album Finally Famous, 2011
- "My House", a song by PVRIS from the album White Noise, 2014
- "My House", a song by Terrorvision from the album Formaldehyde, 1993

== Video games ==
- MyHouse.wad, a Doom II mod released in 2023

== See also ==
- It's My House (disambiguation)
- My Home (disambiguation)
- My Place (disambiguation)
- Our House (disambiguation)
