= My Place =

My Place may refer to:

== Music ==
- My Place (album), by Monika Borzym, or the title song, 2013
- "My Place" (song), by Nelly, 2004
- "My Place", a song by Crazy Town from The Brimstone Sluggers, 2015
- "My Place", a song by the Crystals, 1965
- "My Place", a song by Diana Ross from Everything Is Everything, 1970
- "My Place", a song by T-Pain from Rappa Ternt Sanga, 2005
- "My Place", a song by Tweet from Southern Hummingbird, 2002
- "My Place", a song by the Vamps from Night & Day, 2017
- "My Place", a song by Jaguar Wright from Divorcing Neo 2 Marry Soul, 2005
- "My Place (Evergreen)", a song by Aqua Timez, 2007

== Other uses ==
- My Place (book), a 1987 autobiography by Sally Morgan
- My Place (TV series), a 2009–2011 Australian children's series, based on Wheatley's book
- My Place, a 1987 children's picture book by Nadia Wheatley
- My Place Australia, an Australian conspiracy theorist group

== See also ==
- "In My Place", a 2002 song by Coldplay
