= It's My House (disambiguation) =

"It's My House" is a 1979 song by Diana Ross.

It's My House may also refer to:

- "It's My House", a song by Donna DeLory from the album Donna DeLory, 1992
- "It's My House", a song by Mika from the album My Name Is Michael Holbrook, 2019

== See also ==
- My House (disambiguation)
