= Endless Summer (Oceana song) =

Single by Oceana Mahlmann

from the album My House
- Released: 4 May 2012
- Genre: Popcorn
- Length: 3:11 (video version); 3:30 (single mix); 3:40 (reggae version)
- Label: Embassy of Music
- Songwriters: Oceana Mahlmann, Marc F. Jackson, Andreas Litterscheid, Blair Mackichan, Hugo Oscar, Reinhard Raith, Mense Reents, Jakobus Siebels

Oceana Mahlmann singles chronology
"La La" (2010)	"Endless Summer" (2012)	"Put Your Gun Down" (2012)

Music video
- "Endless Summer" on YouTube

"Endless Summer" is a song by German singer Oceana Mahlmann, from her second album My House (2012), serving as the lead single. It was the official song of the UEFA Euro 2012 held in Poland and Ukraine.

It uses a sample of the electro track "Blaue Moschee" by German project Die Vögel.

An excerpt of the song can be heard on the UEFA Euro 2012 video game, with it playing before every match in the tournament modes as well as in the intro.

== Charts and certifications ==
=== Weekly charts ===
Weekly chart performance for "Endless Summer"
Chart (2012)	Peak position
Austria (Ö3 Austria Top 40)	17
Belgium (Ultratop 50 Flanders)	24
Belgium (Ultratop 50 Wallonia)	39
Czech Republic Airplay (ČNS IFPI)	1
France (SNEP)	182
Germany (GfK)	5
Greece Digital Songs (Billboard)	3
Hungary (Dance Top 40)	8
Hungary (Rádiós Top 40)	4
Italy (FIMI)	2
Luxembourg Digital Songs (Billboard)	3
Netherlands (Single Top 100)	83
Poland Airplay (ZPAV)	1
Romania (Romanian Top 100)	8
Russia (2M)	6
Spain (Promusicae)	26
Switzerland (Schweizer Hitparade)	6
Ukrainian Airplay (Russian Music Charts)	15

=== Year-end charts ===
2012 year-end chart performance for "Endless Summer"
Chart (2012)	Position
Germany (Official German Charts)	45
Hungary (Dance Top 40)	45
Hungary (Rádiós Top 40)	31
Italy (FIMI)	21
Poland (ZPAV)	22
Russia Airplay (TopHit)	82
Ukraine Airplay (TopHit)	25

2013 year-end chart performance for "Endless Summer"
Chart (2013)	Position
Russia Airplay (TopHit)	132

=== Certifications ===
Certifications for "Endless Summer"
Region	Certification	Certified units/sales
Italy (FIMI)	Platinum	30,000^{*}
Germany (BVMI)	Gold	150,000^{^}
^{*} Sales figures based on certification alone.^{^} Shipments figures based on certification alone.
