= My House (album) =

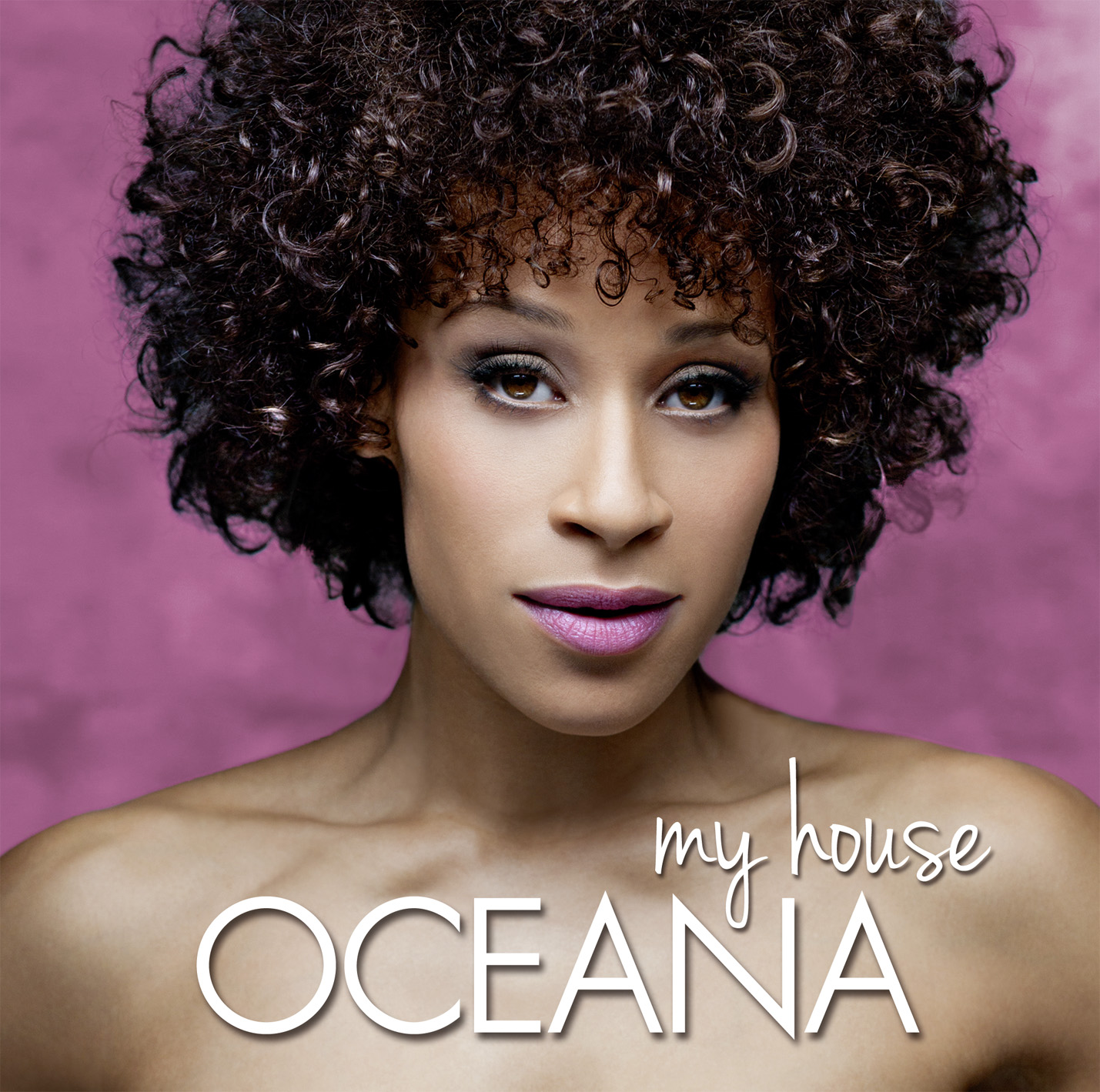

Studio album by Oceana
- Released: July 22, 2012
- Recorded: 2010–2011
- Genres: Pop, R&B, Dance
- Length: 59:07
- Label: Embassy of Music

Oceana chronology
Love Supply (2009)	My House (2012)

Singles from My House
- 1. "Endless Summer" Released: May 4, 2012; 2. "Put Your Gun Down"; 3. "Say Sorry"

My House is the second studio album by German singer Oceana released on July 22, 2012 on Embassy of Music. The song "Endless Summer" served as the official UEFA Euro 2012 anthem.

== Track listing ==
1. "My House" – 4:02 (Oceana Mahlmann, Fin Greenall, Blair Mackichan)
2. "Sunshine Everyday" – 3:54 (Oceana Mahlmann, Blair Mackichan)
3. "Amazing" (feat. Maceo Parker) – 3:27 (Oceana Mahlmann, Marcus Brosch, Anes Krpi, Tobias Neumann)
4. "Lose Control" – 3:15 (Oceana Mahlmann)
5. "Put Your Gun Down" – 3:55 (Oceana Mahlmann, Marcus Brosch, Anes Krpi, Tobias Neumann)
6. "Say Sorry" – 4:30 (Oceana Mahlmann, Blair Mackichan)
7. "Sweet Violet" – 4:13 (Mark Tremaine Agbi)
8. "Diamonds" – 2:50 (Oceana Mahlmann, Robert Davis)
9. "Endless Summer" – 3:11 (Oceana Mahlmann, Marc F. Jackson, Andreas Litterscheid, Blair Mackichan, Hugo Oscar, Reinhard Raith, Mense Reents, Jakobus Siebels)
10. "Love is Dying" (feat. Mr. Vegas) – 3:52 (Oceana Mahlmann)
11. "Better Days" – 3:46 (Oceana Mahlmann, Marcus Brosch, Gavin Jones)
12. "Hopes and Sins" – 3:46 (Oceana Mahlmann, Blair Mackichan)
13. "Some People" – 3:07 (Oceana Mahlmann, Robert Davis)
14. "Don't Walk Away" – 3:23 (Oceana Mahlmann)
15. "A Rockin' Good Way" (feat. Maceo Parker) – 7:55 (Oceana Mahlmann)
