= UEFA Euro 2012 broadcasting rights =

Below is the list of broadcasting right holders for UEFA Euro 2012. European Broadcasting Union and Sportfive acted as the agent who responsible for TV right sales in Europe and Asia-Pacific respectively. Eurosport also secured the rights to broadcast the matches on tape delay in 58 European countries.

== Television ==
In January 2012, it was announced that Telekomunikacja Polska and Orange had successfully completed the first phase of tests of the technology infrastructure and services to be provided during the competition to bring connectivity to over twenty locations in Poland (host cities, stadiums, hotels for UEFA representatives) and between Poland and Ukraine.

According to UEFA requirements, TP ensured approximately 2х70 Gbit/s data communication speed from Polish stadiums and 2х140 Gbit/s between Poland and Ukraine. This was required due to the fact that the matches were broadcast in HD quality. The multilateral production utilised 31 cameras to cover the action on and around the pitch at every match, with additional cameras following activities around the game, such as team arrivals at the stadiums, interviews, and media conferences. The official Euro 2012 broadcasting centre was located at the Expo XXI International Centre in Warsaw.

=== UEFA ===
Territory	Rights holder	Ref
Albania	RTSH	
Armenia	AMPTV	
Austria	ORF	
Azerbaijan	AzTV	
Belarus	BTRC	
Belgium	RTBF; VRT	
Bosnia and Herzegovina	BHRT	
Bulgaria	BNT	
Croatia	HRT	
Cyprus	CyBC	
Czech Republic	Czech Television	
Denmark	DR; TV 2; TV4 Group	
Estonia	ERR	
Finland	Yle; MTV3	
France	TF1; M6; BeIN Sports	
Georgia	GPB	
Germany	ARD; ZDF	
Greece	ERT	
Hungary	MTV	
Iceland	RÚV	
Republic of Ireland	RTÉ	
Israel	Charlton Ltd.	
Italy	RAI	
Kazakhstan	Kazakhstan TV; Perviy Kanal Evraziya	
Latvia	LTV	
Lithuania	LRT	
Macedonia	MKRTV	
Malta	PBS	
Republic of Moldova	TRM	
Montenegro	RTCG	
Netherlands	NOS	
Norway	NRK; TV2; TV4 Group	
Poland	TVP	
Portugal	RTP; SIC; TVI; SportTV	
Romania	TVR; Dolce	
Russia	Channel One; VGTRK	
Serbia	RTS	
Slovakia	RTVS	
Slovenia	RTVSLO	
Spain	Mediaset España	
Sweden	SVT; TV4; Canal Digital	
Switzerland	SRG SSR	
Turkey	TRT	
Ukraine	NTKU; Ukrayina	
United Kingdom	BBC; ITV (STV · UTV)	

=== Rest of the world ===
Territory	Rights holder	Ref
Australia	SBS; Setanta Sports	
Bangladesh	Maasranga TV	
Bolivia	Bolivisión	
Brazil	Organizações Globo; TV Bandeirantes	
Brunei	Astro	
Canada	CTV; TSN; RDS; TLN	
Caribbean	ESPN	
Chile	Chilevisión; Telecanal	
People's Republic of China	CCTV; GDTV	
Colombia	RCN TV	
Costa Rica	Repretel	
Fiji	Fiji Television; Sky Pacific	
Hong Kong	Now TV; TVB	
Indonesia	RCTI; Indovision	
Iran	IRIB	
Japan	TBS; WOWOW	
Kosovo	RTK	
Latin America	DirecTV; Televideo Services	
Macau	TDM	
Malaysia	astro; Media Prima	
Maldives	TVM; VTV	
Mexico	TV Azteca; Televisa	
MENA	Al Jazeera Sport	
Mongolia	ETV; TV9	
Myanmar	Sky Net	
Pacific Islands	Sky Pacific	
Pakistan	PTV	
Papua New Guinea	EM TV; Sky Pacific	
Philippines	Solar Entertainment Corporation; AKTV	
Singapore	StarHub TV	
South Africa	SuperSport	
South Asia	NEO Sports	
South Korea	IB Sports	
Sub-Saharan Africa	SuperSport	
Thailand	GMM Grammy; Channel 3; Channel 5; Modernine TV	
United States	ESPN	
Uruguay	Tenfield	
Venezuela	Meridiano Televisión	
Vietnam	K+; VTV; HTV	

== Radio ==
Apart from European Broadcasting Union which land the rights in June 2011, below is the list of confirmed radio broadcasters for the tournament:

Territory	Rights holder	Ref
Azerbaijan	CJSC	
Brazil	ESPN Brasil	
Bulgaria	BNR	
Czech Republic	ČRo	
Denmark	DR	
France	Radio France; RMC; Europe 1; RTL; RFI	
Germany	ARD; RTL	
Hungary	MR	
Republic of Ireland	RTÉ	
Israel	IBA	
Kazakhstan	JSC	
Latvia	LR	
Norway	NRK	
Poland	Polskie Radio	
Portugal	RTP; TSF; Rádio Renascença	
Romania	ROR	
Slovakia	RTVS	
Spain	RNE; SER; COPE; Simply Sport; Onda Cero; Radio Marca; ABC Punto Radio	
Sweden	SR	
Ukraine	NRU	
United Kingdom	Absolute Radio; BBC; Talksport	
United States	ESPN	
