= Monika Borzym =

Polish jazz singer

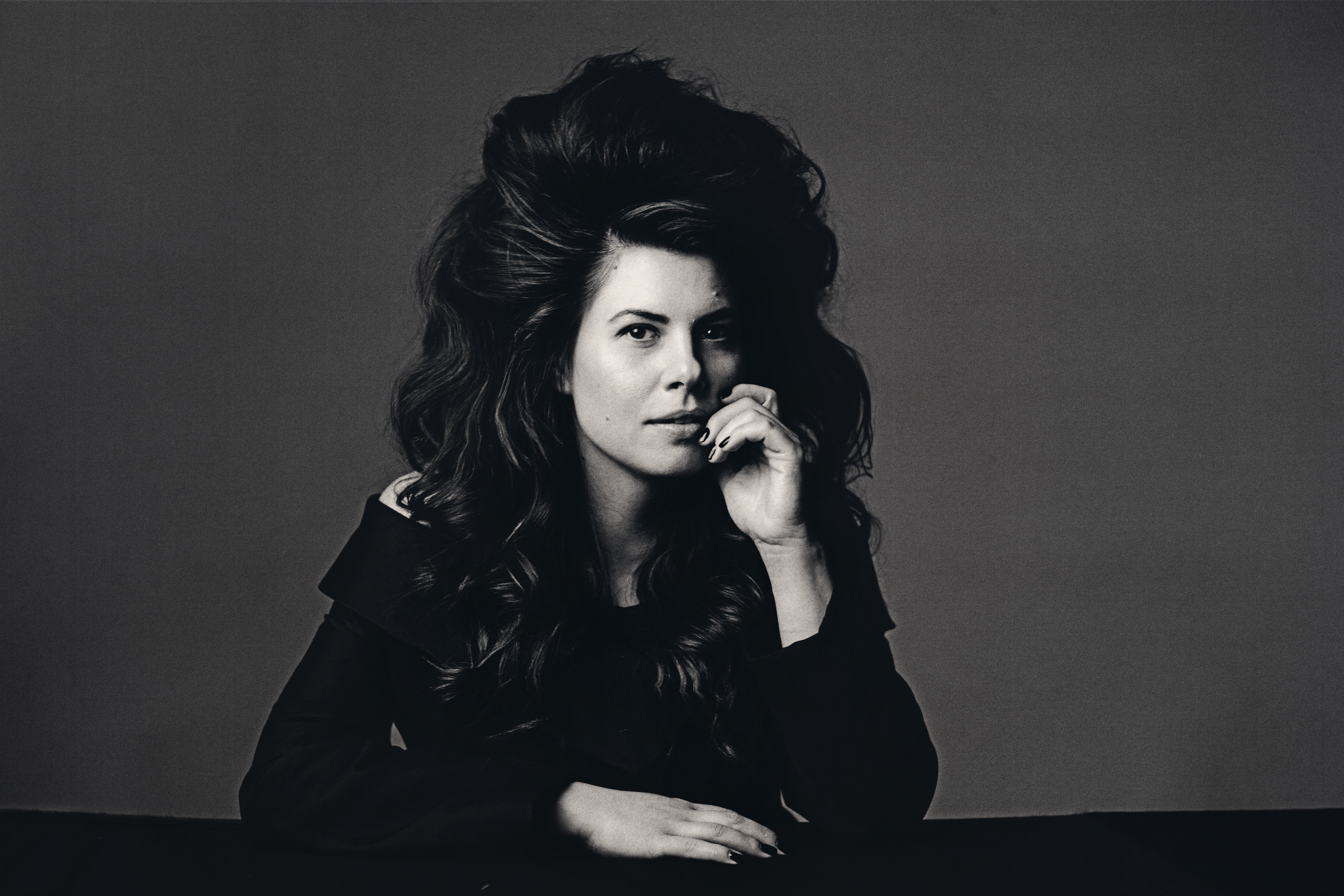
- Monika Borzym in 2026

Background information
- Born: Monika Borzym; March 3, 1990 (age 36); Warsaw
- Genres: Jazz
- Occupation: Singer
- Label: Sony
- Website: monikaborzym.pl

Monika Borzym (Polish: [mɔˈnika ˈbɔʐɨm]; born March 3, 1990) is a Polish jazz singer who studied at Los Angeles Music Academy. Her debut album Girl Talk, released in 2011 was certified platinum in Poland.

== History ==
=== Early life and education (1998–2008) ===
Monika Borzym began her musical education in 1998, when she started attending music school in Warsaw and playing the piano. From August 2005 to June 2006, she was living in the U.S., where she attended John Hersey High School in Arlington Heights, Illinois and started learning jazz improvisation from Gail Bisesi in Chicago.

After her return to Poland, she continued her education in Fryderyk Chopin Public Secondary School of Music in Warsaw in the class of Jazz Vocal (also attended by another Polish jazz vocalist, Aga Zaryan, several years earlier). In 2008, Borzym received a scholarship to study at University of Miami Frost School of Music, where she studied in classes of jazz musicians, such as Lisanne Lyons, Dante Luciani, Chuck Bergeron, Larry Lapin and Greg Gisbert.

=== Break-through, Girl Talk and My Place (2009–present) ===
During the 2009 edition of the Jazz Jamboree festival, she was the only Polish artist and the only female artist invited by Michał Urbaniak to perform in the Congress Hall in Palace of Culture and Science.

In 2010, Borzym signed a contract with Sony Music Poland. Her debut album Girl Talk, recorded in the U.S. and produced by Matt Pierson, was released on 3 October 2011. It contained fresh interpretations (arranged by Gil Goldstein) of songs originally recorded by female jazz, soul and pop artists, such as Joni Mitchell, Björk, Erykah Badu and Amy Winehouse, among others. The album has received critical acclaim and was certified Platinum in Poland.

On 15 October 2013, Borzym released her sophomore album, My Place, consisting of original material and three covers.

== Personal life ==
In 2010, Borzym married Makary Janowski, son of Polish singer and TV presenter Robert Janowski; the couple used to live in Los Angeles. They divorced after five years of marriage.

In 2019, Borzym had her first child with her partner, Polish musician Michał Bryndal.

== Discography ==
=== Studio albums ===
Title	Album details	Peak chart positions	Certifications
Title	Album details	POL	Certifications
Girl Talk	Released: 3 October 2011; Label: Sony Music Entertainment Poland	9	ZPAV: Platinum
My Place	Released: 15 October 2013; Label: Sony Music Entertainment Poland	18	ZPAV: Gold
Back to the Garden	Released: 28 October 2016; Label: Sony Music Entertainment Poland		
Jestem przestrzeń	Released: 28 July 2017; Label: Agora	11	

=== Singles ===
Title	Year	Album
"Appletree"	2011	Girl Talk
"Zniknąć stąd"	2013	Non-album single
"Off to Sea"	2013	My Place
