= Oceana (singer) =

German singer (born 1982)

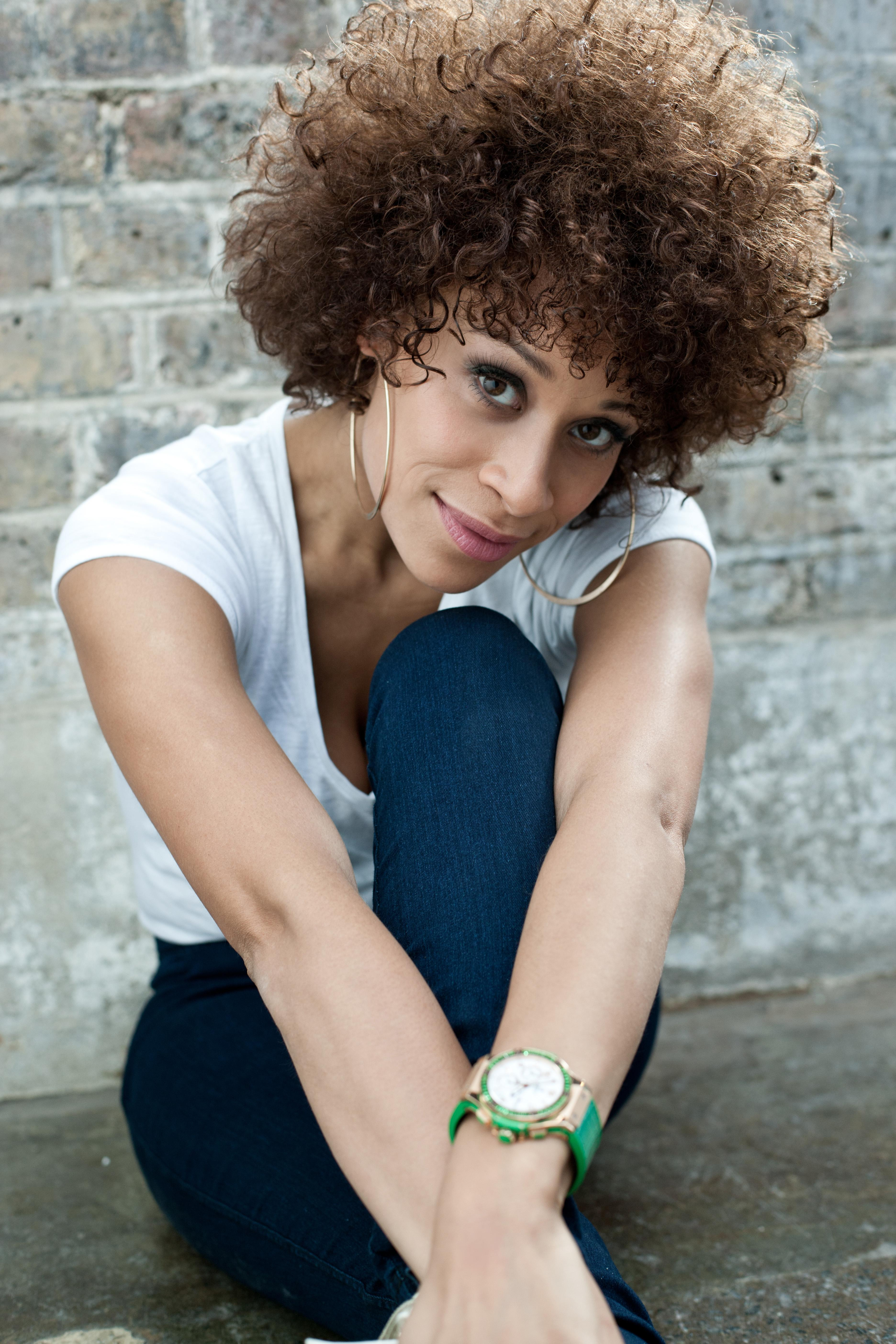
- Oceana in a press photo taken in 2012

Background information
- Born: Oceana Mahlmann; 23 January 1982 (age 44); Wedel, West Germany
- Origin: Germany
- Genres: Soul, pop, R&B, reggae, dance-pop
- Occupations: Singer, songwriter
- Years active: 1997–present
- Label: Ministry of Sound
- Website: https://bnmusic-artists.com/oceana/

Oceana Mahlmann (born 23 January 1982) is a German singer. Her musical roots are embedded in soul, reggae, hip hop, and funk.

== Biography ==
Oceana was raised by her mother, a German haute couture designer. Her father was a DJ from Martinique. The funk legend Maceo Parker is a close family friend and as a young child she performed with him on stage.

In her teens, she established herself as a dancer and choreographer. She performed in the role of Aida in the musical Aida by Tim Rice and Elton John. She was also the vocal soloist in the musical version of Dirty Dancing by Eleanor Bergstein. In 2006, she was the choreographer of the German chart-breaking band Seeed.

In 2008, she signed to Warner to establish herself as a singer-songwriter.

Her solo career took off in 2009 with the release of the single "Cry Cry" from her debut album Love Supply, which was also released on the US-market by the label Ultra Records. This was a breakthrough in her career: the song was the highest selling single in Poland that year and peaked in several other European countries in the charts. Following this success Oceana appeared in numerous European TV shows.

In March 2010, she appeared in the Polish version of Dancing with the Stars, but she withdrew, because she was in an advanced state of pregnancy, and finished in 6th place. In May 2010, she hosted the TV show Arte Lounge, which aired on the acclaimed European channel Arte. She has also appeared as a musical guest on the Greek X Factor and performed on some of the greatest festivals in Europe. On her tour for Love Supply, she performed festivals such as Rock En Seine in France and the Sopot International Song Festival in Poland. Throughout her career, she has supported musicians such as Lionel Richie, Raphael Saadiq, and Annie Lennox.

Due to her success the UEFA chose her to perform the official song for the UEFA Euro 2012 titled "Endless Summer". At the closing ceremony on 1 July 2012 Oceana performed the song live to a television audience of approximately one billion people. The video of Endless Summer" has been watched by more than 80 million people. The song received numerous gold and platinum awards throughout Europe (Germany, Poland, Russia, Ukraine, and Italy).

Her second album, My House, was released in Europe on 22 July 2012.

Oceana worked on her third album in Los Angeles, which was scheduled for release in late 2014 or 2015. After long anticipation, her third studio album "Can't Stop Thinking About You" was released in 2018.

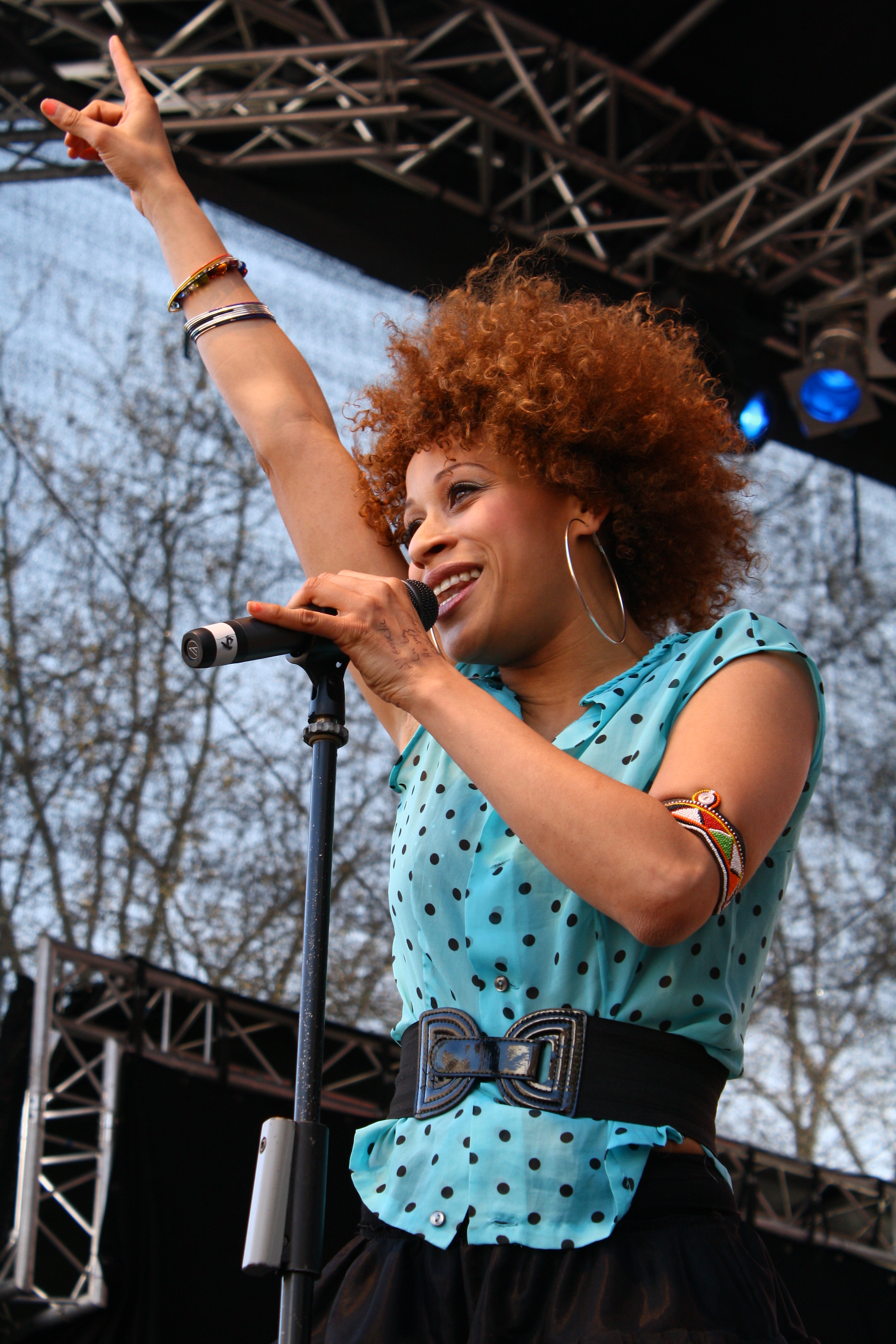
Oceana performing at the Radio Hamburg Top 820 in April 2009

== Awards and nominations ==
Award	Year	Nominee(s)	Category	Result	Ref.
Echo Music Prize	2013	"Endless Summer"	Best National Video	Eliminated	

== Discography ==
=== Albums ===
Title	Album details	Peak chart positions						
Title	Album details	DEU	AUT	CHE	ESP	FRA	GRE	POL
Love Supply	Release date: 2009	—	—	—	53	58	2	11
My House	Release date: 2012	89	—	84	—	—	—	15
Can't Stop Thinking About You	Release date: 2018	—	—	—	—	—	—	—
"—" denotes a recording that did not chart or was not released in that territory.

=== Singles ===
Title	Year	Peak chart positions											Album
Title	Year	GER	AUT	BEL-F	BEL-W	CHE	ESP	GRE	HUN	ITA	POL	UKR	Album
"Cry Cry"	2009	52	73	25	59	39	8	1	1	–	1	3	Love Supply
"Pussycat on a Leash"	2009	—	—	—	—	—	—	—	2	—	—	—	Love Supply
"La La"	2010	—	—	—	—	—	—	—	—	—	—	—	Love Supply
"Endless Summer"	2012	5	17	24	39	6	26	3	19	2	1	15	My House
"Put Your Gun Down"	2012	—	—	—	—	—	—	—	—	96	—	—	My House
"Say Sorry"	2012	86	—	—	—	—	—	—	—	—	—	—	My House
"Thank You"	2014	—	—	—	—	—	—	—	—	—	—	—	—N/a
"Everybody"	2014	—	—	—	—	—	—	—	—	—	—	—	—N/a
"MVP" (Feat. Crazy Hype)	2016	—	—	—	—	—	—	—	—	—	—	—	—N/a
"Brace" (Feat. Crazy Hype)	2016	—	—	—	—	—	—	—	—	—	—	—	—N/a
"Can’t Stop Thinking About You"	2017	—	—	—	—	—	—	—	—	—	—	—	—N/a
"—" denotes a recording that did not chart or was not released in that territory.
