= UEFA Euro 2012 =

Football championship

Polish: Mistrzostwa Europy w Piłce Nożnej 2012; Ukrainian: Чемпіонат Європи з футболу 2012
- Razem tworzymy przyszłość (Creating the Future Together); Творимо історію разом (Creating History Together)

Tournament details
- Host countries: Poland; Ukraine
- Dates: 8 June – 1 July
- Teams: 16
- Venues: 8 (in 8 host cities)

Final positions
- Champions: Spain (3rd title)
- Runners-up: Italy
- Third place: Portugal; Germany (Note: The tournament semi-finalists were awarded bronze medals, despite the absence of a third-place match.)

Tournament statistics
- Matches played: 31
- Goals scored: 76 (2.45 per match)
- Attendance: 1,440,896 (46,481 per match)
- Top scorers: (Croatia) Mario Mandžukić; (Germany) Mario Gómez; (Italy) Mario Balotelli; (Portugal) Cristiano Ronaldo; (Russia) Alan Dzagoev; (Spain) Fernando Torres; (3 goals each)
- Best player: (Spain) Andrés Iniesta

The 2012 UEFA European Football Championship, commonly referred to as UEFA Euro 2012 or simply Euro 2012 (both stylized in all caps), was the 14th European Championship for men's national football teams organised by UEFA. The final tournament, held between 8 June and 1 July 2012, was co-hosted by Poland and Ukraine (both first time hosts), and was won by Spain, who beat Italy in the final at the Olympic Stadium, Kyiv, Ukraine.

Poland and Ukraine's bid was chosen by the UEFA Executive Committee on 18 April 2007. The two host teams qualified automatically while the remaining 14 finalists were decided through a qualifying competition, featuring 51 teams, from August 2010 to November 2011. This was the last European Championship to employ the 16-team finals format in use since 1996; from Euro 2016 onward, it was expanded to 24 finalists.

Euro 2012 was played at eight venues, four in each host country. Five new stadiums were built for the tournament, and the hosts invested heavily in improving infrastructure such as railways and roads at UEFA's request. Euro 2012 set attendance records for the 16-team format, for the highest aggregate attendance (1,440,896) and average per game (46,481).

Spain became the first and to date only team to win two consecutive European Championships, and also three straight major tournaments (Euro 2008, 2010 World Cup and Euro 2012). Spain had already gained entry to the 2013 Confederations Cup by winning the World Cup, so runners-up Italy qualified instead. As at Euro 2008 in Austria and Switzerland, both 2012 host nations were eliminated in the group stage.

Six players ended on a total of three goals, but because Fernando Torres made an assist and played the fewest minutes of those players, he was named as the Golden Boot winner for the tournament.

== Bid process ==
The hosting of the event was initially contested by five bids representing seven countries: Croatia–Hungary, Greece, Italy, Poland–Ukraine, and Turkey. In November 2005, after an initial consideration of the bid data by UEFA, both the Greek and Turkish bids were eliminated from the process, to leave three candidates.

In May 2006, this was followed by a second round of the selection process, which included visits by UEFA to all candidates. The final decision was due to be announced on 8 December 2006 in Nyon, but this was postponed to "give bidding associations more time for the fine-tuning of their bids". On 18 April 2007, the Poland–Ukraine bid was chosen by a vote of the UEFA Executive Committee, at a meeting in Cardiff. It was the first time UEFA awarded the tournament organization to the former Eastern Bloc since Yugoslavia in 1976.

Poland–Ukraine became the third successful joint bid for the European Championship, after those of Belgium–Netherlands (2000) and Austria–Switzerland (2008). Their bid received an absolute majority of votes, and was therefore announced the winner, without requiring a second round. Italy, which received the remaining votes, had been considered favourites to win the hosting, but incidents of fan violence and a match-fixing scandal were widely cited as factors behind their failure.

There were some later alterations from the initial bid plan, regarding the venues, before UEFA confirmed the eight host cities in 2009. During the preparation process in Poland and Ukraine, UEFA repeatedly expressed concern about their preparation to host the event, with different candidates reported as being alternative hosts if they did not improve; however, in the end, UEFA affirmed their selection.

== Qualification ==
The draw for the UEFA Euro 2012 qualifying competition took place at the Palace of Culture and Science in Warsaw on 7 February 2010. Fifty-one teams entered to compete for the fourteen remaining places in the finals, alongside co-hosts Poland and Ukraine. The teams were divided into nine groups, with the draw using the new UEFA national team coefficient for the first time in order to determine the seedings. As defending champions, Spain was automatically top-seeded. The qualifying process began in August 2010 and concluded in November 2011. At the conclusion of the qualifying group stage in October 2011, the nine group winners qualified automatically, along with the highest ranked second placed team. The remaining eight second-placed teams contested two-legged play-offs, and the four winners qualified for the finals.

Twelve of the sixteen finalists participated at the previous tournament in 2008. England and Denmark made their return to the Euro after missing out on 2008, while Republic of Ireland returned after a twenty-four-year absence to make their second appearance at a European Championship. One of the co-hosts, Ukraine, made their debut as an independent nation (before 1992 Ukraine participated as part of the Soviet Union). With the exception of Serbia – according to UEFA's ranking at the end of the qualifying stage – Europe's sixteen highest-ranked teams all qualified for the tournament.

Romania and Turkey were the only teams failing to qualify for the final tournament after qualifying to UEFA Euro 2008. (Austria and Switzerland also failed to qualify, but, as hosts of the previous tournament, they did not need to take part in qualifying.)

As of 2024, this was the last time Greece qualified for the European Championship finals, and the last time Austria, Belgium, Hungary, Slovakia, Switzerland and Turkey failed to qualify.

=== Qualified teams ===
The following sixteen teams qualified for the finals:

Team	Qualified as	Qualified on	Previous appearances in tournament (Note: Bold indicates champion for that year. Italic indicates host for that year.)
Poland	Co-host	18 April 2007	1 (2008)
Ukraine	Co-host	18 April 2007	0 (debut)
Germany (Note: From 1972 to 1988, Germany competed as West Germany.)	Group A winner	2 September 2011	10 (**1972**, 1976, **1980**, 1984, 1988, 1992, **1996**, 2000, 2004, 2008)
Italy	Group C winner	6 September 2011	7 (**1968**, 1980, 1988, 1996, 2000, 2004, 2008)
Netherlands	Group E winner	6 September 2011	8 (1976, 1980, **1988**, 1992, 1996, 2000, 2004, 2008)
Spain	Group I winner	6 September 2011	8 (**1964**, 1980, 1984, 1988, 1996, 2000, 2004, **2008**)
England	Group G winner	7 October 2011	7 (1968, 1980, 1988, 1992, 1996, 2000, 2004)
Russia (Note: From 1960 to 1988, Russia competed as the Soviet Union, and in 1992 as CIS.)	Group B winner	11 October 2011	9 (**1960**, 1964, 1968, 1972, 1988, 1992, 1996, 2004, 2008)
France	Group D winner	11 October 2011	7 (1960, **1984**, 1992, 1996, **2000**, 2004, 2008)
Greece	Group F winner	11 October 2011	3 (1980, **2004**, 2008)
Denmark	Group H winner	11 October 2011	7 (1964, 1984, 1988, **1992**, 1996, 2000, 2004)
Sweden	Best runner-up	11 October 2011	4 (1992, 2000, 2004, 2008)
Croatia	Play-off winner	15 November 2011	3 (1996, 2004, 2008)
Czech Republic (Note: From 1960 to 1980, the Czech Republic competed as Czechoslovakia.)	Play-off winner	15 November 2011	7 (1960, **1976**, 1980, 1996, 2000, 2004, 2008)
Portugal	Play-off winner	15 November 2011	5 (1984, 1996, 2000, 2004, 2008)
Republic of Ireland	Play-off winner	15 November 2011	1 (1988)

=== Final draw ===
The draw for the final tournament took place on 2 December 2011 at the Ukraine Palace of Arts in Kyiv, Ukraine. The hour-long ceremony was hosted by Olha Freimut and Piotr Sobczyński, television presenters from the two host countries.

As was the case for the 2000, 2004 and 2008 finals, the sixteen finalists were divided into four seeding pots, using the UEFA national team coefficient ranking. The pot allocations were based on the UEFA national team coefficient rankings of the sixteen finalists at the end of the qualifying competition in November 2011. Each nation's coefficient was generated by calculating:

- 40% of the average ranking points per game earned in the UEFA Euro 2012 qualifying stage.
- 40% of the average ranking points per game earned in the 2010 FIFA World Cup qualifying stage and final tournament.
- 20% of the average ranking points per game earned in the UEFA Euro 2008 qualifying stage and final tournament.

Aside from the coefficient, three teams were automatically placed in Pot 1. Ukraine and Poland were both assigned to Pot 1 as the two host nations, despite the fact that their rankings were the two lowest in the tournament; this also occurred in 2008 when the co-hosts Switzerland and Austria were also ranked below all other qualified teams. As defending champions, Spain were also automatically assigned to Pot 1, though their UEFA ranking at the time of the draw was coincidentally also the best.

In the draw procedure, one team from each pot was drawn into each of the four groups. The draw also determined which place in the group teams in pots 2–4 would take (e.g. A2, A3 or A4) to create the match schedule. With Poland automatically assigned in advance to A1, and Ukraine to D1, Pot 1 only had two teams as Spain and the Netherlands were to be drawn into position one in either group B or C. The balls were drawn by four former players who had each been part of European Championship winning teams: Horst Hrubesch, Marco van Basten, Peter Schmeichel and Zinedine Zidane.

Pot 1 (Note: Co-hosts Poland (coefficient 23,806; rank 28th) and Ukraine (coefficient 28,029; rank 15th) belonged to Pot 1 irrespective of their ranking position. Ahead of the draw, they were removed as drawing options from Pot 1, and instead automatically assigned to Group position A1 and D1 respectively.)
Team	Coeff	Rank
Spain (holders) (Note: Defending champions Spain (coefficient 43,116; rank 1st) were automatically assigned to Pot 1, and could be drawn into either Group position B1 or C1.)	43,116	1
Netherlands	40,860	2

Pot 2
Team	Coeff	Rank
Germany	40,446	3
Italy	34,357	4
England	33,563	5
Russia	33,212	6

Pot 3
Team	Coeff	Rank
Croatia	33,003	7
Greece	32,455	8
Portugal	31,717	9
Sweden	31,675	10

Pot 4
Team	Coeff	Rank
Denmark	31,205	11
France	30,508	12
Czech Republic	29,602	13
Republic of Ireland	28,576	14

Automatically selected as a top-seeded team into pot 1, irrespective of their ranking position.

Teams were drawn consecutively into Group A to D. First, the Pot 1 teams were assigned to the first positions of their groups, while next the positions of all other teams were drawn separately from Pot 4 to 2 (for the purposes of determining the match schedules in each group).

The draw resulted in the following groups:

Group A Team Poland Greece Russia Czech Republic	Group B Team Netherlands Denmark Germany Portugal	Group C Team Spain Italy Republic of Ireland Croatia	Group D Team Ukraine Sweden France England

== Venues ==
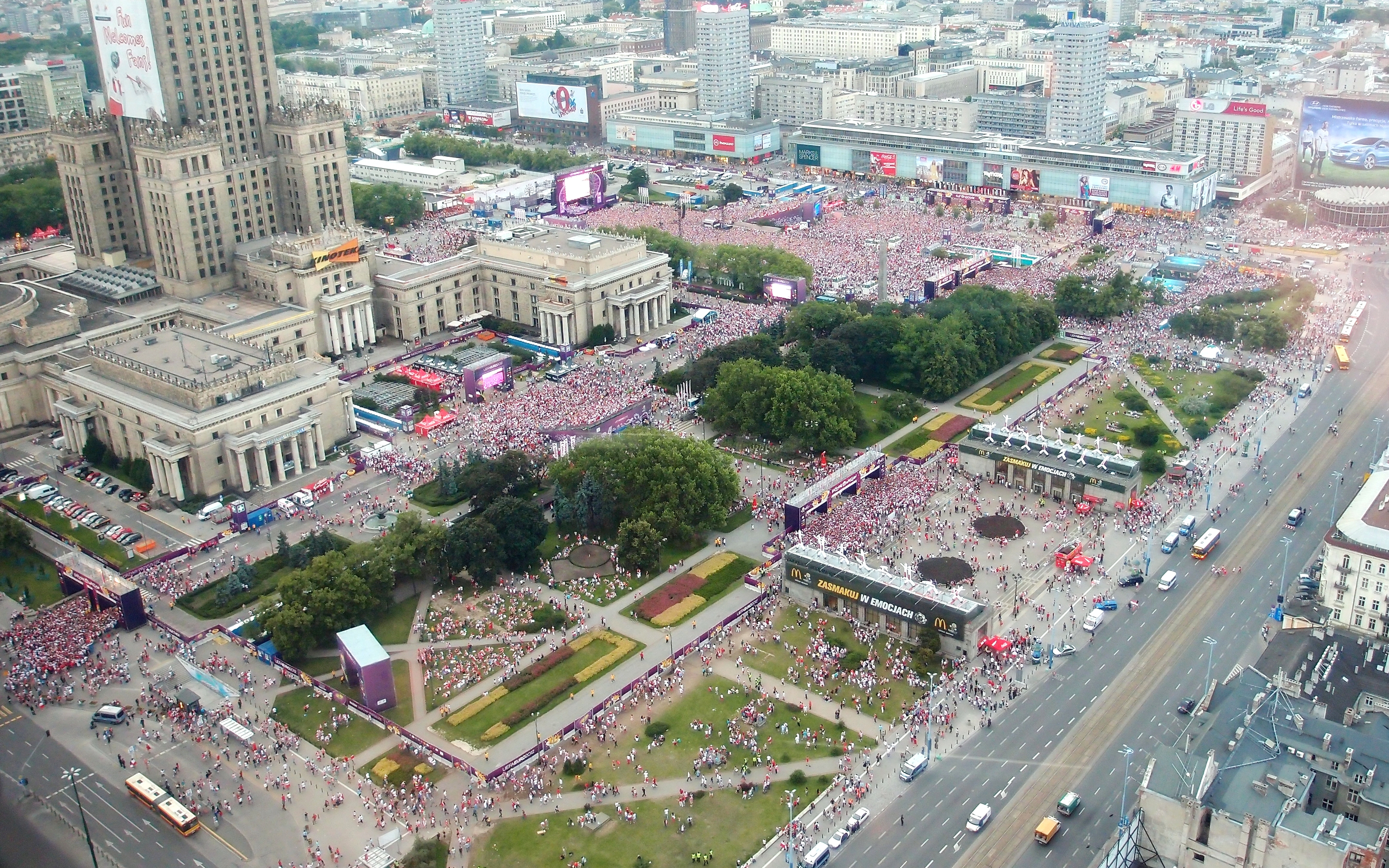
Warsaw fan zone, view during a game, 16 June

Eight cities were selected by UEFA as host venues. In a return to the format used at Euro 1992, Euro 1996 and Euro 2008, each of the four groups' matches were played in two stadiums. Host cities Warsaw, Gdańsk, Wrocław, Poznań, Kyiv, and Lviv are all popular tourist destinations, unlike Donetsk and Kharkiv, the latter of which replaced Dnipropetrovsk as a host city in 2009.

In order to meet UEFA's requirement for football infrastructure improvements, five new stadiums were built and opened in advance of the tournament. The remaining three stadiums (in Kyiv, Poznań and Kharkiv) underwent major renovations in order to meet UEFA's infrastructure standards. Three of the stadiums are categorised as UEFA's highest category stadiums. The transport infrastructure in Poland and Ukraine was also extensively modified on the request of UEFA to cope with the large influx of football fans.

UEFA organised fan zones in the eight host cities. They were located in the centre of each city, with all 31 matches shown live on a total of 24 giant screens. The zones enabled supporters to come together in a secure and controlled environment. The Warsaw Fan Zone occupied 120,000 square meters and accommodated 100,000 visitors. In all, the fans zones had a 20% increase in capacity compared to Euro 2008.

A total of 31 matches were played during Euro 2012, with Ukraine hosting 16 of them and Poland 15.

Poland
Warsaw	Wrocław	Gdańsk	Poznań
National Stadium	Wrocław Stadium (Stadion Miejski)	Gdańsk Stadium (PGE Arena)	Poznań Stadium (Stadion Miejski)
Capacity: 58,580	Capacity: 45,105	Capacity: 43,615	Capacity: 43,269
Location of the host cities of the UEFA Euro 2012.
Ukraine
Kyiv	Donetsk	Kharkiv	Lviv
Olympic Stadium	Donbas Arena	Metalist Stadium	Arena Lviv
Capacity: 70,050	Capacity: 51,504	Capacity: 40,003	Capacity: 34,915

=== Ticketing ===
Tickets for the venues were sold directly by UEFA via its website, or distributed by the football associations of the 16 finalists. Applications had to be made during March 2011 for the 1.4 million tickets available for the 31 tournament matches. Over 20,000 were forecast to cross the Poland–Ukraine border each day during the tournament. Over 12 million applications were received, which represented a 17% increase on the 2008 finals, and an all-time record for the UEFA European Championship. Owing to this over-subscription for the matches, lotteries were carried out to allocate tickets. Prices varied from €30 (£25) for a seat behind the goals at a group match to €600 (£513) for a seat in the main stand at the final. In addition to individual match tickets, fans could buy packages to see either all matches played by one team, or all matches at one specific venue.

=== Team base camps ===
Each team had a "team base camp" for its stay between the matches. From an initial list of thirty-eight potential locations (twenty-one in Poland, seventeen in Ukraine), the national associations chose their locations in 2011. The teams trained and resided in these locations throughout the tournament, travelling to games staged away from their bases. Thirteen teams stayed in Poland and three in Ukraine.

Team	Base camp
Croatia	Warka
Czech Republic	Wrocław
Denmark	Kołobrzeg
England	Kraków
France	Donetsk
Germany	Gdańsk
Greece	Jachranka
Italy	Kraków
Netherlands	Kraków
Poland	Warsaw
Portugal	Opalenica
Republic of Ireland	Sopot
Russia	Warsaw
Spain	Gniewino
Sweden	Kyiv
Ukraine	Kyiv

== Match ball ==
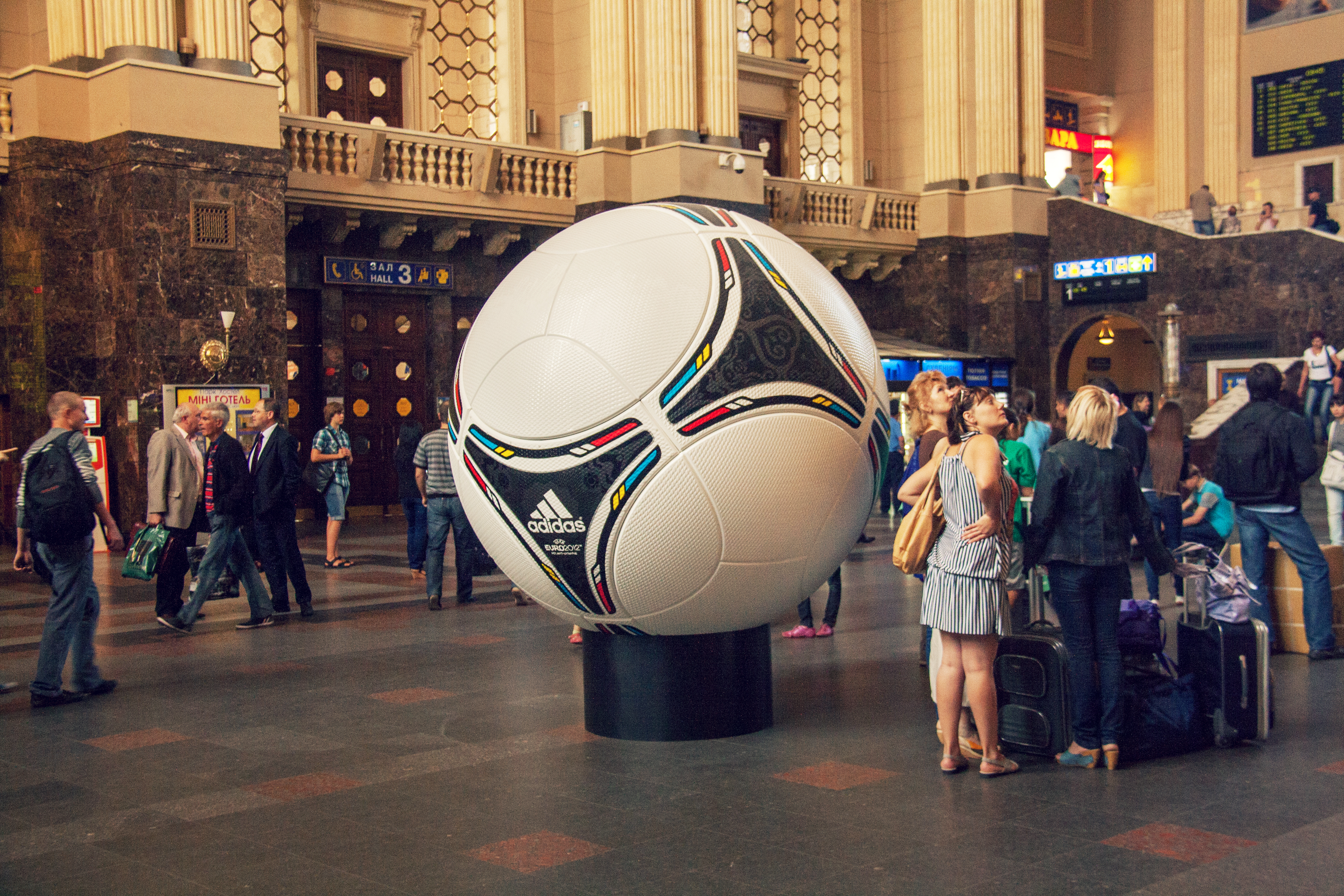
Monumental Adidas Tango 12 in Kyiv

The Adidas Tango 12 was the official match ball of UEFA Euro 2012. The ball is named after the original Adidas Tango family of footballs; however, the Tango 12 and its variations have a completely new design. Variations of the ball have been used in other contemporary competitions including the Africa Cup of Nations and the Summer Olympics. It is designed to be easier to dribble and control than the reportedly unpredictable Adidas Jabulani used at the 2010 FIFA World Cup.

== Squads ==
Each national team had to submit a squad of 23 players, three of whom must be goalkeepers, at least ten days before the opening match of the tournament. If a player became injured or ill severely enough to prevent his participation in the tournament before his team's first match, he would be replaced by another player.

== Match officials ==
On 20 December 2011, UEFA named twelve referees and four fourth officials for Euro 2012. On 27 March 2012, UEFA issued the full list of 80 referees to be used in Euro 2012, including the assistant referees, the additional assistant referees, and the four reserve assistant referees. Each refereeing team consisted of five match officials from the same country: one main referee, two assistant referees, and two additional assistant referees. All of the main referees, additional assistant referees, and fourth officials were FIFA referees, and the assistant referees (including the four reserve assistant referees) were FIFA assistant referees. For each refereeing team, a third assistant referee from each country was named to remain on standby until the start of the tournament to take the place of a colleague if required. In two cases, for the French and Slovenian refereeing teams, the standby assistant referees took the place of one of the assistant referees before the start of the tournament. Continuing the experiments carried out in the UEFA Champions League and UEFA Europa League, the two additional assistant referees were used on the goal line for the first time in European Championship history with approval from the International Football Association Board.

Country	Referee	Assistant referees	Additional assistant referees	Matches refereed
England	Howard Webb	Michael Mullarkey; Peter Kirkup (Note: Peter Kirkup was replaced by Dutch assistant Sander van Roekel for the match Czech Republic–Portugal); Stephen Child (standby)	Martin Atkinson; Mark Clattenburg	Russia–Czech Republic (Group A); Italy–Croatia (Group C); Czech Republic–Portugal (Quarter-final)
France	Stéphane Lannoy	Frédéric Cano; Michaël Annonier; Eric Dansault (standby)	Fredy Fautrel; Ruddy Buquet	Germany–Portugal (Group B); Greece–Czech Republic (Group A); Germany–Italy (Semi-final)
Germany	Wolfgang Stark	Jan-Hendrik Salver; Mike Pickel; Mark Borsch (standby)	Florian Meyer; Deniz Aytekin	Poland–Russia (Group A); Croatia–Spain (Group C)
Hungary	Viktor Kassai	Gábor Erős; György Ring; Róbert Kispál (standby)	István Vad; Tamás Bognár	Spain–Italy (Group C); England–Ukraine (Group D)
Italy	Nicola Rizzoli	Renato Faverani; Andrea Stefani; Luca Maggiani (standby)	Gianluca Rocchi; Paolo Tagliavento	France–England (Group D); Portugal–Netherlands (Group B); Spain–France (Quarter-final)
Netherlands	Björn Kuipers	Sander van Roekel; Erwin Zeinstra; Berry Simons (standby)	Pol van Boekel; Richard Liesveld	Republic of Ireland–Croatia (Group C); Ukraine–France (Group D)
Portugal	Pedro Proença	Bertino Miranda; Ricardo Santos; Tiago Trigo (standby)	Jorge Sousa; Duarte Gomes	Spain–Republic of Ireland (Group C); Sweden–France (Group D); England–Italy (Quarter-final); Spain–Italy (Final)
Scotland	Craig Thomson	Alasdair Ross; Derek Rose; Graham Chambers (standby)	Willie Collum; Euan Norris	Denmark–Portugal (Group B); Czech Republic–Poland (Group A)
Slovenia	Damir Skomina	Primož Arhar; Matej Žunič; Marko Stančin (standby)	Matej Jug; Slavko Vinčić	Netherlands–Denmark (Group B); Sweden–England (Group D); Germany–Greece (Quarter-final)
Spain	Carlos Velasco Carballo	Roberto Alonso Fernández; Juan Carlos Yuste Jiménez; Jesús Calvo Guadamuro (standby)	David Fernández Borbalán; Carlos Clos Gómez	Poland–Greece (Group A); Denmark–Germany (Group B)
Sweden	Jonas Eriksson	Stefan Wittberg; Mathias Klasenius; Fredrik Nilsson (standby)	Markus Strömbergsson; Stefan Johannesson	Netherlands–Germany (Group B); Greece–Russia (Group A)
Turkey	Cüneyt Çakır	Bahattin Duran; Tarık Ongun; Mustafa Emre Eyisoy (standby)	Hüseyin Göçek; Bülent Yıldırım	Ukraine–Sweden (Group D); Italy–Republic of Ireland (Group C); Portugal–Spain (Semi-final)

Four match officials, who served only as fourth officials, and four reserve assistant referees were also named:

Country	Fourth official
Czech Republic	Pavel Královec
Norway	Tom Harald Hagen
Poland	Marcin Borski
Ukraine	Viktor Shvetsov

Country	Reserve assistant referee
Republic of Ireland	Damien MacGraith
Poland	Marcin Borkowski
Slovakia	Roman Slyško
Ukraine	Oleksandr Voytyuk

== Group stage ==
Winner Runner-up / Semi-finals Quarter-finals / Group stage

UEFA announced the schedule for the 31 matches of the final tournament in October 2010, with the final confirmation of kick-offs times being affirmed following the tournament draw in December 2011.

The teams finishing in the top two positions in each of the four groups progressed to the quarter-finals, while the bottom two teams were eliminated from the tournament.

=== Tiebreakers ===
If two or more teams were equal on points on completion of the group matches, the following tie-breaking criteria were applied:

1. Higher number of points obtained in the matches played between the teams in question;
2. Superior goal difference resulting from the matches played between the teams in question;
3. Higher number of goals scored in the matches played between the teams in question;
4. If, after having applied criteria 1 to 3, teams still had an equal ranking (e.g. if criteria 1 to 3 were applied to three teams that were level on points initially and these criteria separated one team from the other two who still have an equal ranking), criteria 1 to 3 would be reapplied exclusively to the matches between the teams who were still level to determine their final rankings. If this procedure did not lead to a decision, criteria 5 to 9 would apply;
5. Superior goal difference in all group matches;
6. Higher number of goals scored in all group matches;
7. Position in the UEFA national team coefficient ranking system;
8. Fair play conduct of the teams (final tournament);
9. Drawing of lots.

However, the normal tiebreaking criteria do not apply if on the last round of group stage, two teams are playing against each other tied on points, goal difference, goals scored, and goals conceded, then drew their match and no other teams are tied on points; in that case their ranking is determined by penalty shoot-out.

=== Group A ===
Pos	Team	Pld	W	D	L	GF	GA	GD	Pts	Qualification
1	Czech Republic	3	2	0	1	4	5	−1	6	Advance to knockout stage
2	Greece	3	1	1	1	3	3	0	4 (Note: Head-to-head result: Greece 1–0 Russia.)	Advance to knockout stage
3	Russia	3	1	1	1	5	3	+2	4	
4	Poland (H)	3	0	2	1	2	3	−1	2	

Source: UEFA
(H) Hosts
Notes:
8 June 2012
18:00 CEST

Poland	1–1	Greece
Lewandowski 17'	Report	Salpingidis 51'

National Stadium, Warsaw
Attendance: 56,070
Referee: Carlos Velasco Carballo (Spain)
8 June 2012
20:45 CEST

Russia	4–1	Czech Republic
Dzagoev 15', 79'; Shirokov 24'; Pavlyuchenko 82'	Report	Pilař 52'

Stadion Miejski, Wrocław
Attendance: 40,803
Referee: Howard Webb (England)

12 June 2012
18:00 CEST

Greece	1–2	Czech Republic
Gekas 53'	Report	Jiráček 3'; Pilař 6'

Stadion Miejski, Wrocław
Attendance: 41,105
Referee: Stéphane Lannoy (France)
12 June 2012
20:45 CEST

Poland	1–1	Russia
Błaszczykowski 57'	Report	Dzagoev 37'

National Stadium, Warsaw
Attendance: 55,920
Referee: Wolfgang Stark (Germany)

16 June 2012
20:45 CEST

Czech Republic	1–0	Poland
Jiráček 72'	Report

Stadion Miejski, Wrocław
Attendance: 41,480
Referee: Craig Thomson (Scotland)
16 June 2012
20:45 CEST

Greece	1–0	Russia
Karagounis 45+2'	Report

National Stadium, Warsaw
Attendance: 55,614
Referee: Jonas Eriksson (Sweden)

=== Group B ===
Pos	Team	Pld	W	D	L	GF	GA	GD	Pts	Qualification
1	Germany	3	3	0	0	5	2	+3	9	Advance to knockout stage
2	Portugal	3	2	0	1	5	4	+1	6	Advance to knockout stage
3	Denmark	3	1	0	2	4	5	−1	3	
4	Netherlands	3	0	0	3	2	5	−3	0	

Source: UEFA
9 June 2012
19:00 EEST

Netherlands	0–1	Denmark
	Report	Krohn-Dehli 24'

Metalist Stadium, Kharkiv
Attendance: 35,923
Referee: Damir Skomina (Slovenia)
9 June 2012
21:45 EEST

Germany	1–0	Portugal
Gómez 72'	Report

Arena Lviv, Lviv
Attendance: 32,990
Referee: Stéphane Lannoy (France)

13 June 2012
19:00 EEST

Denmark	2–3	Portugal
Bendtner 41', 80'	Report	Pepe 24'; Postiga 36'; Varela 87'

Arena Lviv, Lviv
Attendance: 31,840
Referee: Craig Thomson (Scotland)
13 June 2012
21:45 EEST

Netherlands	1–2	Germany
Van Persie 73'	Report	Gómez 24', 38'

Metalist Stadium, Kharkiv
Attendance: 37,750
Referee: Jonas Eriksson (Sweden)

17 June 2012
21:45 EEST

Portugal	2–1	Netherlands
Ronaldo 28', 74'	Report	Van der Vaart 11'

Metalist Stadium, Kharkiv
Attendance: 37,445
Referee: Nicola Rizzoli (Italy)
17 June 2012
21:45 EEST

Denmark	1–2	Germany
Krohn-Dehli 24'	Report	Podolski 19'; Bender 80'

Arena Lviv, Lviv
Attendance: 32,990
Referee: Carlos Velasco Carballo (Spain)

=== Group C ===
Pos	Team	Pld	W	D	L	GF	GA	GD	Pts	Qualification
1	Spain	3	2	1	0	6	1	+5	7	Advance to knockout stage
2	Italy	3	1	2	0	4	2	+2	5	Advance to knockout stage
3	Croatia	3	1	1	1	4	3	+1	4	
4	Republic of Ireland	3	0	0	3	1	9	−8	0	

Source: UEFA
10 June 2012
18:00 CEST

Spain	1–1	Italy
Fàbregas 64'	Report	Di Natale 61'

PGE Arena, Gdańsk
Attendance: 38,869
Referee: Viktor Kassai (Hungary)
10 June 2012
20:45 CEST

Republic of Ireland	1–3	Croatia
St Ledger 19'	Report	Mandžukić 3', 49'; Jelavić 43'

Stadion Miejski, Poznań
Attendance: 39,550
Referee: Björn Kuipers (Netherlands)

14 June 2012
18:00 CEST

Italy	1–1	Croatia
Pirlo 39'	Report	Mandžukić 72'

Stadion Miejski, Poznań
Attendance: 37,096
Referee: Howard Webb (England)
14 June 2012
20:45 CEST

Spain	4–0	Republic of Ireland
Torres 4', 70'; Silva 49'; Fàbregas 83'	Report

PGE Arena, Gdańsk
Attendance: 39,150
Referee: Pedro Proença (Portugal)

18 June 2012
20:45 CEST

Croatia	0–1	Spain
	Report	Navas 88'

PGE Arena, Gdańsk
Attendance: 39,076
Referee: Wolfgang Stark (Germany)
18 June 2012
20:45 CEST

Italy	2–0	Republic of Ireland
Cassano 35'; Balotelli 90'	Report

Stadion Miejski, Poznań
Attendance: 38,794
Referee: Cüneyt Çakır (Turkey)

=== Group D ===
Pos	Team	Pld	W	D	L	GF	GA	GD	Pts	Qualification
1	England	3	2	1	0	5	3	+2	7	Advance to knockout stage
2	France	3	1	1	1	3	3	0	4	Advance to knockout stage
3	Ukraine (H)	3	1	0	2	2	4	−2	3 (Note: Head-to-head result: Ukraine 2–1 Sweden.)	
4	Sweden	3	1	0	2	5	5	0	3	

Source: UEFA
(H) Hosts
Notes:
11 June 2012
19:00 EEST

France	1–1	England
Nasri 39'	Report	Lescott 30'

Donbas Arena, Donetsk
Attendance: 47,400
Referee: Nicola Rizzoli (Italy)
11 June 2012
21:45 EEST

Ukraine	2–1	Sweden
Shevchenko 55', 61'	Report	Ibrahimović 52'

Olympic Stadium, Kyiv
Attendance: 64,290
Referee: Cüneyt Çakır (Turkey)

15 June 2012
19:00 EEST

Ukraine	0–2	France
	Report	Ménez 53'; Cabaye 56'

Donbas Arena, Donetsk
Attendance: 48,000
Referee: Björn Kuipers (Netherlands)
15 June 2012
22:00 EEST (Note: The match, originally scheduled for 21:45 local time, was delayed 15 minutes to prevent overlap with the other Group D match between Ukraine and France, which had been delayed due to rain.)

Sweden	2–3	England
Johnson 49' (o.g.); Mellberg 59'	Report	Carroll 23'; Walcott 64'; Welbeck 78'

Olympic Stadium, Kyiv
Attendance: 64,640
Referee: Damir Skomina (Slovenia)

19 June 2012
21:45 EEST

England	1–0	Ukraine
Rooney 48'	Report

Donbas Arena, Donetsk
Attendance: 48,700
Referee: Viktor Kassai (Hungary)
19 June 2012
21:45 EEST

Sweden	2–0	France
Ibrahimović 54'; Larsson 90+1'	Report

Olympic Stadium, Kyiv
Attendance: 63,010
Referee: Pedro Proença (Portugal)

== Knockout stage ==
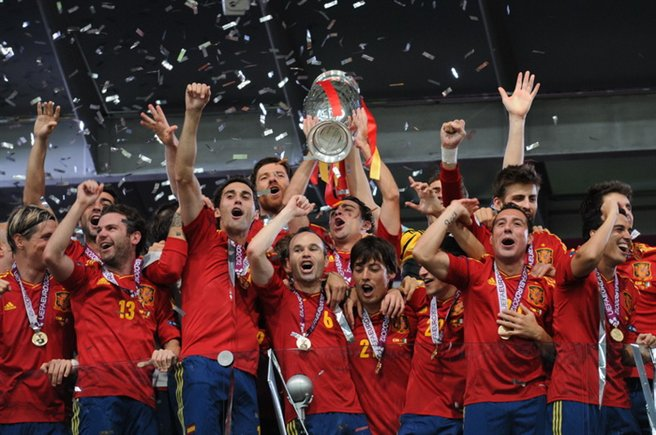
Spain players holding the Henri Delaunay Trophy

In the knockout stage, extra time and a penalty shoot-out were used to decide the winner if necessary.

As with every tournament since UEFA Euro 1984, there was no third place play-off.

=== Bracket ===
Quarter-finals
21 June – Warsaw
Czech Republic	0
Portugal	1
23 June – Donetsk
Spain	2
France	0
22 June – Gdańsk
Germany	4
Greece	2
24 June – Kyiv
England	0 (2)
Italy (p)	0 (4)

Semi-finals
27 June – Donetsk
Portugal	0 (2)
Spain (p)	0 (4)
28 June – Warsaw
Germany	1
Italy	2

Final
1 July – Kyiv
Spain	4
Italy	0

=== Quarter-finals ===
21 June 2012
20:45 CEST

Czech Republic	0–1	Portugal
	Report	Ronaldo 79'

National Stadium, Warsaw
Attendance: 55,590
Referee: Howard Webb (England)

22 June 2012
20:45 CEST

Germany	4–2	Greece
Lahm 39'; Khedira 61'; Klose 68'; Reus 74'	Report	Samaras 55'; Salpingidis 89' (pen.)

PGE Arena, Gdańsk
Attendance: 38,751
Referee: Damir Skomina (Slovenia)

23 June 2012
21:45 EEST

Spain	2–0	France
Alonso 19', 90+1' (pen.)	Report

Donbas Arena, Donetsk
Attendance: 47,000
Referee: Nicola Rizzoli (Italy)

24 June 2012
21:45 EEST

England	0–0 (a.e.t.)	Italy
	Report
Penalties
Gerrard (penalty scored); Rooney (penalty scored); Young (penalty missed); Cole (penalty missed)	2–4	(penalty scored) Balotelli; (penalty missed) Montolivo; (penalty scored) Pirlo; (penalty scored) Nocerino; (penalty scored) Diamanti

Olympic Stadium, Kyiv
Attendance: 64,340
Referee: Pedro Proença (Portugal)

=== Semi-finals ===
27 June 2012
21:45 EEST

Portugal	0–0 (a.e.t.)	Spain
	Report
Penalties
Moutinho (penalty missed); Pepe (penalty scored); Nani (penalty scored); Alves (penalty missed)	2–4	(penalty missed) Alonso; (penalty scored) Iniesta; (penalty scored) Piqué; (penalty scored) Ramos; (penalty scored) Fàbregas

Donbas Arena, Donetsk
Attendance: 48,000
Referee: Cüneyt Çakır (Turkey)

28 June 2012
20:45 CEST

Germany	1–2	Italy
Özil 90+2' (pen.)	Report	Balotelli 20', 36'

National Stadium, Warsaw
Attendance: 55,540
Referee: Stéphane Lannoy (France)

=== Final ===
1 July 2012
21:45 EEST

Spain	4–0	Italy
Silva 14'; Alba 41'; Torres 84'; Mata 88'	Report

Olympic Stadium, Kyiv
Attendance: 63,170
Referee: Pedro Proença (Portugal)

== Statistics ==
=== Goalscorers ===
There were 76 goals scored in 31 matches, for an average of 2.45 goals per match.

3 goals

- (Croatia) Mario Mandžukić
- (Germany) Mario Gómez
- (Italy) Mario Balotelli
- (Portugal) Cristiano Ronaldo
- (Russia) Alan Dzagoev
- (Spain) Fernando Torres

2 goals

- (Czech Republic) Petr Jiráček
- (Czech Republic) Václav Pilař
- (Denmark) Nicklas Bendtner
- (Denmark) Michael Krohn-Dehli
- (Greece) Dimitris Salpingidis
- (Spain) Xabi Alonso
- (Spain) Cesc Fàbregas
- (Spain) David Silva
- (Sweden) Zlatan Ibrahimović
- (Ukraine) Andriy Shevchenko

1 goal

- (Croatia) Nikica Jelavić
- (England) Andy Carroll
- (England) Joleon Lescott
- (England) Wayne Rooney
- (England) Theo Walcott
- (England) Danny Welbeck
- (France) Yohan Cabaye
- (France) Jérémy Ménez
- (France) Samir Nasri
- (Germany) Lars Bender
- (Germany) Sami Khedira
- (Germany) Miroslav Klose
- (Germany) Philipp Lahm
- (Germany) Mesut Özil
- (Germany) Lukas Podolski
- (Germany) Marco Reus
- (Greece) Theofanis Gekas
- (Greece) Giorgos Karagounis
- (Greece) Georgios Samaras
- (Italy) Antonio Cassano
- (Italy) Antonio Di Natale
- (Italy) Andrea Pirlo
- (Netherlands) Rafael van der Vaart
- (Netherlands) Robin van Persie
- (Poland) Jakub Błaszczykowski
- (Poland) Robert Lewandowski
- (Portugal) Pepe
- (Portugal) Hélder Postiga
- (Portugal) Silvestre Varela
- (Republic of Ireland) Sean St Ledger
- (Russia) Roman Pavlyuchenko
- (Russia) Roman Shirokov
- (Spain) Jordi Alba
- (Spain) Juan Mata
- (Spain) Jesús Navas
- (Sweden) Sebastian Larsson
- (Sweden) Olof Mellberg

1 own goal

- (England) Glen Johnson (against Sweden)

Source: UEFA

=== Awards ===
UEFA Team of the Tournament

The UEFA Technical Team was charged with naming a squad composed of the 23 best players over the course of the tournament. The group of eleven analysts watched every game at the tournament before making their decision after the final. Ten players from the winning Spanish team were selected in the team of the tournament, while Zlatan Ibrahimović was the only player to be included whose team was knocked out in the group stage.

Goalkeepers	Defenders	Midfielders	Forwards
(Germany) Manuel Neuer (Italy) Gianluigi Buffon (Spain) Iker Casillas	(Germany) Philipp Lahm (Portugal) Fábio Coentrão (Portugal) Pepe (Spain) Jordi Alba (Spain) Gerard Piqué (Spain) Sergio Ramos	(England) Steven Gerrard (Germany) Sami Khedira (Germany) Mesut Özil (Italy) Daniele De Rossi (Italy) Andrea Pirlo (Spain) Xabi Alonso (Spain) Sergio Busquets (Spain) Andrés Iniesta (Spain) Xavi	(Italy) Mario Balotelli (Portugal) Cristiano Ronaldo (Spain) Cesc Fàbregas (Spain) David Silva (Sweden) Zlatan Ibrahimović

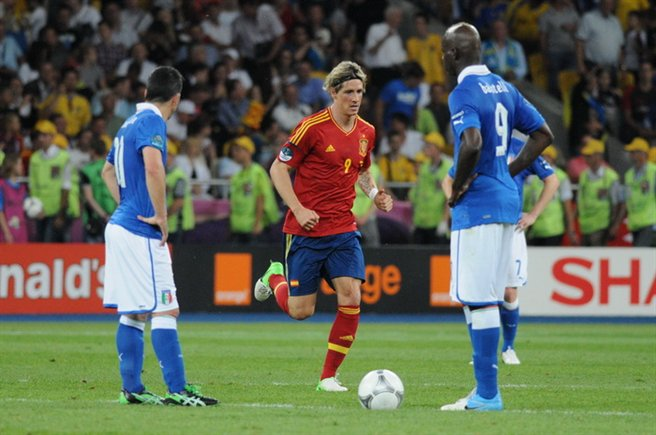
Fernando Torres (in red) in the final

Golden Boot

Fernando Torres tied with five other players on goals and with Mario Gómez on goals and assists; however, he played 92 fewer minutes than Gómez did, thus earning the title. Torres also became the first player to score in two finals.

- (Spain) Fernando Torres (3 goals)

UEFA Player of the Tournament

- (Spain) Andrés Iniesta

=== Prize money ===
A total of €196 million was given to the 16 teams competing in this tournament, an increase from the €184 million in the previous tournament. Each team received an initial €8 million and then received additional money, based on their performances. Spain, the winners of Euro 2012, were awarded a total prize of €23 million for their performance. The maximum prize achievable (for winning all group matches and winning the final) was €23.5 million.

Prize money
Rank (unoff.)	Team	Million €
1	Spain	23.0
2	Italy	19.5
3	Germany	16.0
4	Portugal	15.0
5	England	12.5
6	Czech Republic	12.0
7	France, Greece	11.5
9	Croatia, Russia	10.5
11	Denmark, Ukraine	10.0
13	Poland, Sweden	9.0
15	Netherlands, Republic of Ireland	8.0

Complete list:

- Prize for participating: €8 million

Extra payment based on teams performances:

- Champions: €7.5 million
- Runner-up: €4.5 million
- Reaching the semi-finals: €3 million
- Reaching the quarter-finals: €2 million
- Finishing in third place in a group: €1 million
- Winning a group match: €1 million
- Drawing a group match: €500,000

Besides money, commemorative plaques were given to all participants together with special plaques for semi-final losers and finalists. Gold and silver medals were awarded to the winners and runners-up, respectively, whereas both semi-final losers were awarded bronze medals. The trophy given to the winners remains in the ownership of UEFA; however, the winning nation, Spain, received a full-size replica.

== Discipline ==
In the final tournament, a player was suspended for the subsequent match in the competition for either getting red card or accumulating two yellow cards in two different matches. UEFA's Control and Disciplinary body has the ability to increase the automatic one match ban for a red card (e.g. for violent conduct). Single yellow card cautions were erased at the conclusion of the quarter-finals, and were not carried over to the semi-finals (so that a player could only be suspended for the final by getting a red card in the semi-final). Single yellow cards and suspensions for yellow card accumulations do not carry over to the 2014 FIFA World Cup qualification tournament matches. The following players were suspended during the final tournament – for one or more games – as a result of red cards or yellow card accumulations:

Player	Offences	Suspensions
(England) Wayne Rooney	(red card) in qualification v Montenegro	Group D v France; Group D v Sweden
(Greece) Sokratis Papastathopoulos	(yellow card) (yellow-red card) in Group A v Poland	Group A v Czech Republic
(Poland) Wojciech Szczęsny	(red card) in Group A v Greece	Group A v Russia
(Germany) Jérôme Boateng	(yellow card) in Group B v Portugal; (yellow card) in Group B v Netherlands	Group B v Denmark
(Greece) Giorgos Karagounis	(yellow card) in Group A v Poland; (yellow card) in Group A v Russia	Quarter-final v Germany
(Greece) José Holebas	(yellow card) in Group A v Poland; (yellow card) in Group A v Russia	Quarter-final v Germany
(Republic of Ireland) Keith Andrews	(yellow card) (yellow-red card) in Group C v Italy	World Cup qualifying v Kazakhstan
(France) Philippe Mexès	(yellow card) in Group D v Ukraine; (yellow card) in Group D v Sweden	Quarter-final v Spain
(Italy) Christian Maggio	(yellow card) in Group C v Spain; (yellow card) in Quarter-final v England	Semi-final v Germany

Apart from discipline measures for yellow and red cards, UEFA fined the football associations of Croatia, England, Germany, Portugal, Russia, and Spain a total of €417,000 for spectators incidents. Furthermore, the Portuguese association was fined €5,000 for delaying the start of the second half of the game against Germany. In addition to these, Danish striker Nicklas Bendtner was fined €100,000 and given a one match ban (to be applied in the 2014 FIFA World Cup qualification tournament) for revealing his sponsored underpants, violating UEFA regulations, during the celebration of his second goal in the match against Portugal. His fine was later paid by his sponsor.

== Marketing ==
=== Trophy tour ===
The Henri Delaunay Trophy began a journey through the host cities seven weeks before the start of the tournament. A hundred days before the first match a 35.5-metre-high (116 ft) hot air balloon in the shape of the trophy was flown in Nyon, Switzerland and visited 14 cities throughout the host countries, reminding spectators of the impending tournament. On 20 April 2012, the trophy tour started and visited the Polish cities of Warsaw, Wrocław, Gdańsk, Poznań, Kraków, Katowice and Łódź. After the Polish cities, the trophy visited seven Ukrainian cities: Kyiv, Ivano-Frankivsk, Kharkiv, Donetsk, Dnipropetrovsk, Lviv, and Odesa.

=== Logo, slogan and theme songs ===
The competition slogan, Creating History Together (Polish: Razem tworzymy przyszłość, literally, "Together we are creating the future", Ukrainian: Творимо історію разом, Tvorymo istoriyu razom), was announced along with the logo. The official logo for the tournament was unveiled at a special event at Mykhailivska Square, Kyiv, on 14 December 2009 and was designed by Portuguese group Brandia Central. It took its visual identity from Wycinanki or Vytynanky, a traditional form of paper cutting practised in rural areas of Poland and Ukraine. The art form symbolises the nature of the rural areas of both countries. As part of the event, landmark buildings in the eight host cities were illuminated with the tournament logo.

The official Euro 2012 song was "Endless Summer" by the German singer Oceana. In addition, UEFA retained the melody that was composed by Rollo Armstrong of Faithless on its behalf for the 2008 tournament. The Republic of Ireland also produced an official song: "The Rocky Road to Poland", recorded by a collaboration of Irish performers, quickly reached number 1 in Ireland and stayed there for three weeks. In Spain, the broadcasting company Mediaset España commissioned the song "No hay 2 sin 3", performed by David Bisbal and Cali & El Dandee and produced by RedOne.

The tournament was also associated with the song "Heart of Courage" by Two Steps from Hell, which was played in the stadiums during the entrance of the players (before the national anthems); and also "Seven Nation Army" by The White Stripes, in this case after every goal.

=== Merchandise and mascots ===
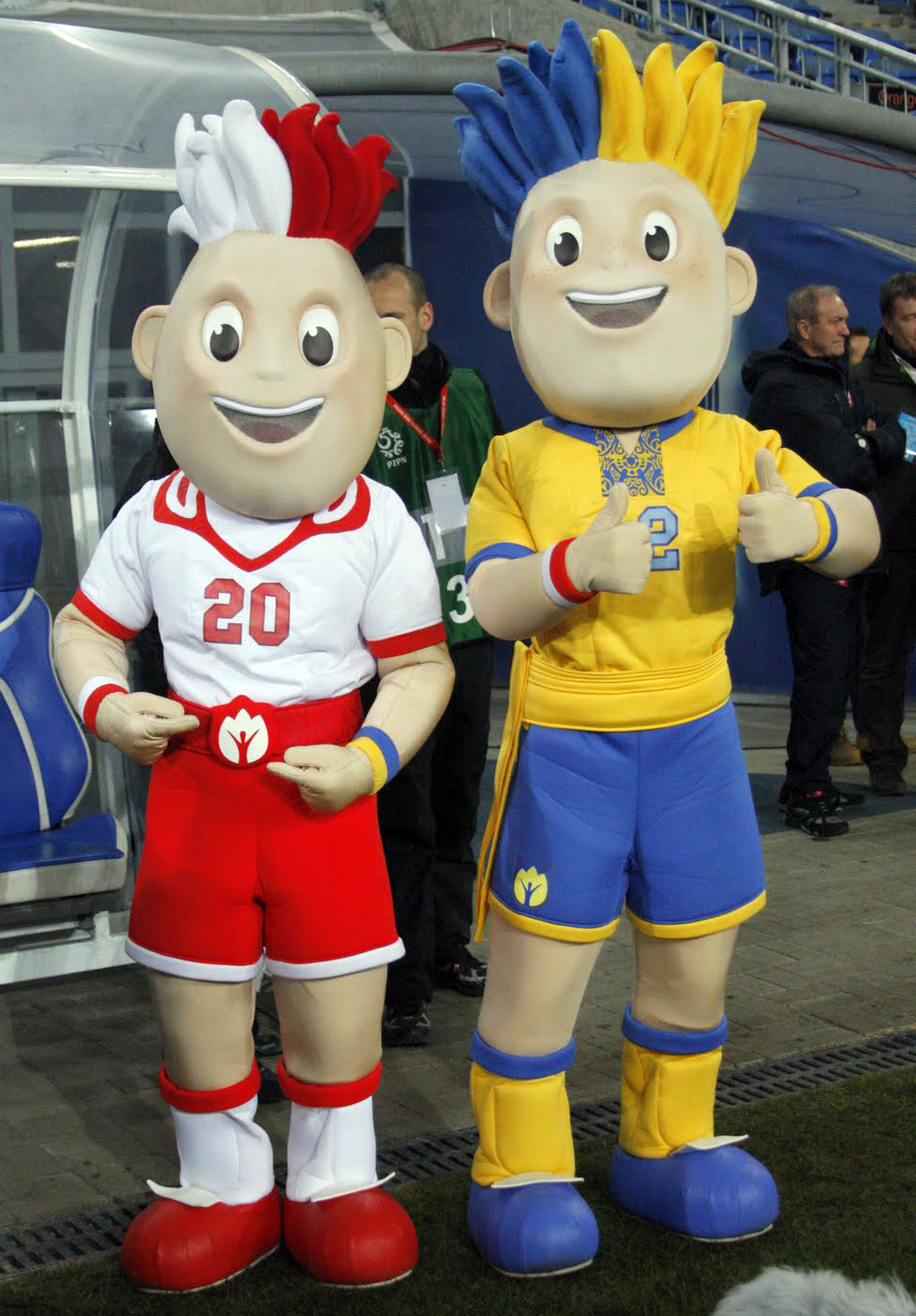
The mascots Slavek & Slavko

UEFA signed a worldwide licensing agreement with Warner Brothers Consumer Products to help promote the tournament. The agreement involved licensing to third parties for a variety of other merchandising items.

Also designed by Warner Bros. were the official tournament mascots, Slavek (Polish: Sławek) and Slavko (Ukrainian: Славко), twins that wore the national colours of the two host nations. The mascots were unveiled in December 2010, and named following an online poll.

=== Video game ===
The UEFA Euro 2012 video game was released by EA Sports as a downloadable expansion pack for FIFA 12.

=== Sponsorship ===
UEFA announced ten global sponsors and, for both Poland and Ukraine, three national sponsors as shown below. These sponsorships together with the broadcasting revenues were estimated to earn UEFA at least US$1.6 billion.

Global sponsors	Event sponsors	
Global sponsors	Ukraine	Poland
Adidas; Canon; Castrol; Coca-Cola; Continental; SHARP; Orange; Hyundai–Kia; Carlsberg; McDonald's	Ukrtelecom; Epicenter; Ukrsotsbank PJSC	E. Wedel; Bank Pekao; MasterCard

== Broadcasting ==
According to UEFA requirements, TP ensured approximately 2х70 Gbit/s data communication speed from Polish stadiums and 2х140 Gbit/s between Poland and Ukraine. This was required due to the fact that the matches were broadcast in HD quality. The multilateral production utilised 31 cameras to cover the action on and around the pitch at every match, with additional cameras following activities around the game, such as team arrivals at the stadiums, interviews, and media conferences. The official Euro 2012 broadcasting centre was located at the Expo XXI International Centre in Warsaw. The tournament was broadcast live by around 100 TV channels covering the whole world. 150,000,000 people were expected to watch the matches each day.

== Concerns and controversies ==
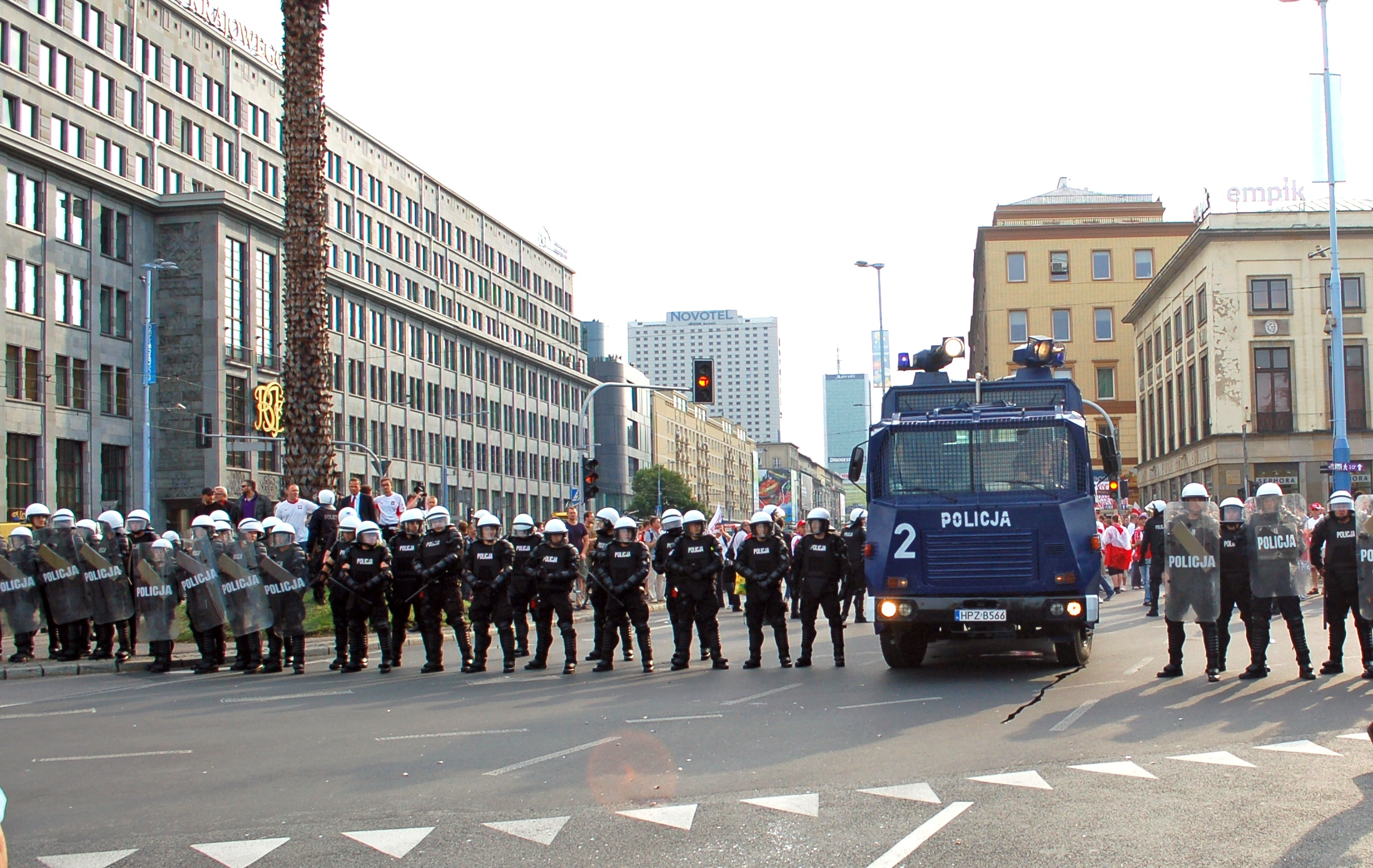
Police in Warsaw before the match between Poland and Russia

After Poland and Ukraine were chosen by a vote of the UEFA Executive Committee as host countries for Euro 2012, several issues arose, which jeopardised the Polish/Ukrainian host status.

In Ukraine, the stadium and infrastructure renovation incurred financial difficulties due to the 2008 financial crisis. In Poland, issues arose related to corruption within the Polish Football Association. In April 2009 however, the president of UEFA, Michel Platini announced that all was on track and that he saw no major problems. After a UEFA delegation visited Ukraine in September 2011, he stated the country was "virtually ready for Euro 2012".

In the UK, there were allegations of racism in football in both host countries. The main cause of discussion was the BBC current affairs programme Panorama, entitled Euro 2012: Stadiums of Hate, which included recent footage of supporters chanting various antisemitic slogans and displays of white power symbols and banners in Poland, plus Nazi salutes and the beating of South Asians in Ukraine. The documentary was first echoed in much of the British press, but was then attacked for being one-sided and unethical: critics included other British media outlets; anti-racism campaigners, black and Jewish community leaders in Poland; Polish and Ukrainian politicians and journalists; England fans visiting the host nations and Gary Lineker, a British football star.

In response to Yulia Tymoshenko's hunger strike and her mistreatment in a Ukrainian prison some European politicians and governments announced that they would boycott the matches in Ukraine.

Ukraine came under criticism from animal welfare organisations for killing stray cats and dogs in order to prepare for Euro 2012. Ukrainian Ministry of Ecology and Natural Resources and Minister of the Environment promised to take action to prevent killing animals but it still remains unclear how these measures were enforced. The ministry's comments also suggested this would only be a temporary measure, drawing further criticism.

Bomb explosions took place in Dnipropetrovsk, Ukraine, on 27 April 2012 and were described as a terrorist attack that may jeopardise the organisation of the tournament in Ukraine.

Other important issues were associated with FEMEN's group protests against prostitution and sex tourism in Ukraine, and enormous increases in hotel prices by many hoteliers in the country.

In total, four nations were fined by UEFA for racist activities by their fans (none of them were hosts): Germany, Spain, Croatia and Russia.
