= My Place (album) =

Studio album by Monika Borzym
- Released: 15 October 2013
- Genre: Jazz
- Label: Sony Music Entertainment Poland
- Producer: Matt Pierson

Monika Borzym chronology
Girl Talk (2011)	My Place (2013)

Singles from My Place
- 1. "Off to Sea" Released: 27 September 2013

My Place is the second studio album by Polish jazz singer Monika Borzym. It was released on 15 October 2013 through Sony Music Entertainment Poland. The album is promoted by the single "Off to Sea". It was certified Gold in Poland two weeks after its premiere.

== Recording and production ==
My Place was produced by Matt Pierson, with whom Borzym has previously worked on her debut album, Girl Talk (2011). Borzym wrote most of the tracks with a friend, pianist Mariusz Obijalski. The album also features three covers: a jazz version of Rihanna's hit single "Only Girl (in the World)", "The Quiet Crowd" by Patrick Watson, and Kenny Rankin's "In the Name of Love".

Borzym was joined in the studio by guitarist Larry Campbell (collaborator of Bob Dylan and Paul Simon), drummer Kenny Wollesen (John Zorn, Norah Jones), and bassist Tony Scherr (Norah Jones, Bill Frisell). The album also features guest appearances by guitarists John Scofield (Miles Davis, Charles Mingus, Herbie Hancock, Pat Metheny), Romero Lubambo and Steve Cardenas, saxophonist Chris Potter and trumpeter Randy Brecker.

== Track listing ==
All tracks are written by Monika Borzym and Mariusz Obijalski, except where noted

No.	Title	Writer(s)	Length
1.	"Falling"		4:48
2.	"Tidal Wave"		4:55
3.	"Only Girl (in the World)"	Crystal Johnson, Mikkel S. Eriksen, Tor Erik Hermansen, Sandy Wilhelm	5:41
4.	"My Place"		3:57
5.	"Finding Her Way"		4:06
6.	"Pisces"		3:42
7.	"Unrequited"		4:52
8.	"Off to Sea"		3:54
9.	"The Quiet Crowd"	Patrick Watson	4:28
10.	"In the Name of Love"	Kenny Rankin	4:01
11.	"Prelude"		1:49
12.	"Świat w proszku"		4:22
13.	"Timeless"		3:31

== Personnel ==
Musicians

- Monika Borzym – vocals
- Larry Campbell – guitar
- Kenny Wollesen – drums
- Tony Scherr – bass
- John Scofield – guitar
- Romero Lubambo – acoustic guitar
- Steve Cardenas - guitar
- Chris Potter – saxophone
- Randy Brecker – trumpet

Technical personnel

- Matt Pierson – production

== Charts and certifications ==
=== Charts ===
Chart (2013)	Peak position
Polish Albums (ZPAV)	18

=== Certifications ===
Region	Certification	Certified units/sales
Poland (ZPAV)	Gold	5,000^{*}
^{*} Sales figures based on certification alone.
