= 2007 Kashiwa Reysol season =

Kashiwa Reysol
2007 season
- Manager: Nobuhiro Ishizaki
- Stadium: Hitachi Kashiwa Soccer Stadium
- J. League 1: 8th
- Emperor's Cup: Fourth round
- J. League Cup: GL-B 3rd
- Top goalscorer: Tadanari Lee (10)

During the 2007 season, Kashiwa Reysol competed in the J. League 1, where they finished 8th. The club also competed in the Emperor's Cup and the J. League Cup.

== Competitions ==
Competitions	Position
J. League 1	8th / 18 clubs
Emperor's Cup	4th Round
J. League Cup	GL-B 3rd / 4 clubs

=== J. League 1 ===
==== League table ====
Pos	Team	Pld	W	D	L	GF	GA	GD	Pts
6	Albirex Niigata	34	15	6	13	48	47	+1	51
7	Yokohama F. Marinos	34	14	8	12	54	35	+19	50
8	Kashiwa Reysol	34	14	8	12	43	36	+7	50
9	Júbilo Iwata	34	15	4	15	54	55	−1	49
10	Vissel Kobe	34	13	8	13	58	48	+10	47

Updated to match(es) played on December 1, 2007. Source: J. League Division 1
Rules for classification: 1) points; 2) goal difference; 3) number of goals scored.

==== Results ====
J.League Division 1 results
Date	Opponent	Venue	Result F–A
4 March 2007	Júbilo Iwata	H	4–0
10 March 2007	Sanfrecce Hiroshima	A	1–1
17 March 2007	Shimizu S-Pulse	A	1–0
31 March 2007	FC Tokyo	H	2–0
7 April 2007	Yokohama F. Marinos	A	2–0
15 April 2007	Urawa Red Diamonds	H	0–2
21 April 2007	Ventforet Kofu	A	2–3
28 April 2007	Nagoya Grampus Eight	H	2–0
3 May 2007	Albirex Niigata	H	0–0
6 May 2007	JEF United Chiba	A	1–1
12 May 2007	Oita Trinita	H	2–0
19 May 2007	Gamba Osaka	A	1–2
26 May 2007	Vissel Kobe	A	1–2
9 June 2007	Omiya Ardija	H	0–0
16 June 2007	Kawasaki Frontale	A	0–0
20 June 2007	Kashima Antlers	H	0–1
23 June 2007	Yokohama FC	A	4–2
30 June 2007	Shimizu S-Pulse	H	1–3
11 August 2007	Urawa Red Diamonds	A	1–1
15 August 2007	Sanfrecce Hiroshima	H	2–0
18 August 2007	FC Tokyo	A	1–0
25 August 2007	JEF United Chiba	H	1–0
29 August 2007	Omiya Ardija	A	1–1
2 September 2007	Yokohama F. Marinos	H	1–0
16 September 2007	Albirex Niigata	A	2–1
23 September 2007	Kawasaki Frontale	H	4–0
29 September 2007	Nagoya Grampus Eight	A	0–2
6 October 2007	Gamba Osaka	H	1–2
20 October 2007	Oita Trinita	A	1–2
27 October 2007	Vissel Kobe	H	1–3
10 November 2007	Yokohama FC	H	1–1
18 November 2007	Kashima Antlers	A	0–1
24 November 2007	Ventforet Kofu	H	2–1
1 December 2007	Júbilo Iwata	A	0–4

== Player statistics ==
No.	Pos.	Player	D.o.B. (Age)	Height / Weight	J. League 1		Emperor's Cup		J. League Cup		Total	
No.	Pos.	Player	D.o.B. (Age)	Height / Weight	Apps	Goals	Apps	Goals	Apps	Goals	Apps	Goals
1	GK	Yuichi Mizutani	26 May 1980 (aged 26)	cm / kg	1	0						
2	DF	Ryo Kobayashi	12 September 1982 (aged 24)	cm / kg	9	0						
3	DF	Naoya Kondo	3 October 1983 (aged 23)	cm / kg	16	1						
4	MF	Alceu	7 May 1984 (aged 22)	cm / kg	28	1						
5	DF	Masahiro Koga	8 September 1978 (aged 28)	cm / kg	29	2						
6	DF	Yusuke Nakatani	22 September 1978 (aged 28)	cm / kg	0	0						
7	MF	Hidekazu Otani	6 November 1984 (aged 22)	cm / kg	31	0						
8	MF	Márcio Araújo	11 June 1984 (aged 22)	cm / kg	5	0						
9	FW	Hideaki Kitajima	23 May 1978 (aged 28)	cm / kg	12	1						
10	FW	França	2 March 1976 (aged 31)	cm / kg	25	8						
11	FW	Yoshiro Abe	5 July 1980 (aged 26)	cm / kg	8	0						
13	DF	Yuzo Kobayashi	15 November 1985 (aged 21)	cm / kg	25	0						
14	MF	Yukihiko Sato	11 May 1976 (aged 30)	cm / kg	22	2						
15	MF	Minoru Suganuma	16 May 1985 (aged 21)	cm / kg	29	6						
16	GK	Kazushige Kirihata	30 June 1987 (aged 19)	cm / kg	0	0						
17	MF	Shunta Nagai	12 July 1982 (aged 24)	cm / kg	18	0						
18	MF	Iwao Yamane	31 July 1976 (aged 30)	cm / kg	21	1						
19	FW	Tetsuya Ōkubo	9 March 1980 (aged 26)	cm / kg	2	0						
20	FW	Tadanari Lee	19 December 1985 (aged 21)	cm / kg	30	10						
21	GK	Yuta Minami	30 September 1979 (aged 27)	cm / kg	33	0						
22	FW	Tatsuya Suzuki	1 August 1982 (aged 24)	cm / kg	16	2						
23	DF	Yohei Kurakawa	10 August 1977 (aged 29)	cm / kg	28	1						
24	MF	Tomonori Hirayama	9 January 1978 (aged 29)	cm / kg	8	0						
25	FW	Yu Hasegawa	5 July 1987 (aged 19)	cm / kg	0	0						
26	DF	Naoki Ishikawa	13 September 1985 (aged 21)	cm / kg	12	0						
27	MF	Jun Yanagisawa	27 June 1987 (aged 19)	cm / kg	0	0						
28	MF	Tatsuya Yazawa	3 October 1984 (aged 22)	cm / kg	23	1						
29	MF	Shu Abe	7 June 1984 (aged 22)	cm / kg	0	0						
30	MF	Yasuki Ishidate	24 September 1984 (aged 22)	cm / kg	0	0						
31	GK	Shinya Kato	19 September 1980 (aged 26)	cm / kg	0	0						
32	DF	Kazunari Okayama	24 April 1978 (aged 28)	cm / kg	1	0						
33	DF	Takahiro Oshima	14 April 1988 (aged 18)	cm / kg	0	0						
34	DF	Ryo Okawara	12 October 1987 (aged 19)	cm / kg	0	0						
35	FW	Seydou Doumbia	31 December 1987 (aged 19)	cm / kg	18	3						
36	FW	Tomoki Ikemoto	27 March 1985 (aged 21)	cm / kg	1	0						
38	MF	Bruno	15 February 1989 (aged 18)	cm / kg	0	0						
39	MF	Keisuke Ota	23 July 1981 (aged 25)	cm / kg	16	3						

== Other pages ==
- (in Japanese) J. League official site
