= Atsuto Uchida =

Japanese footballer (born 1988)

Atsuto Uchida 内田篤人
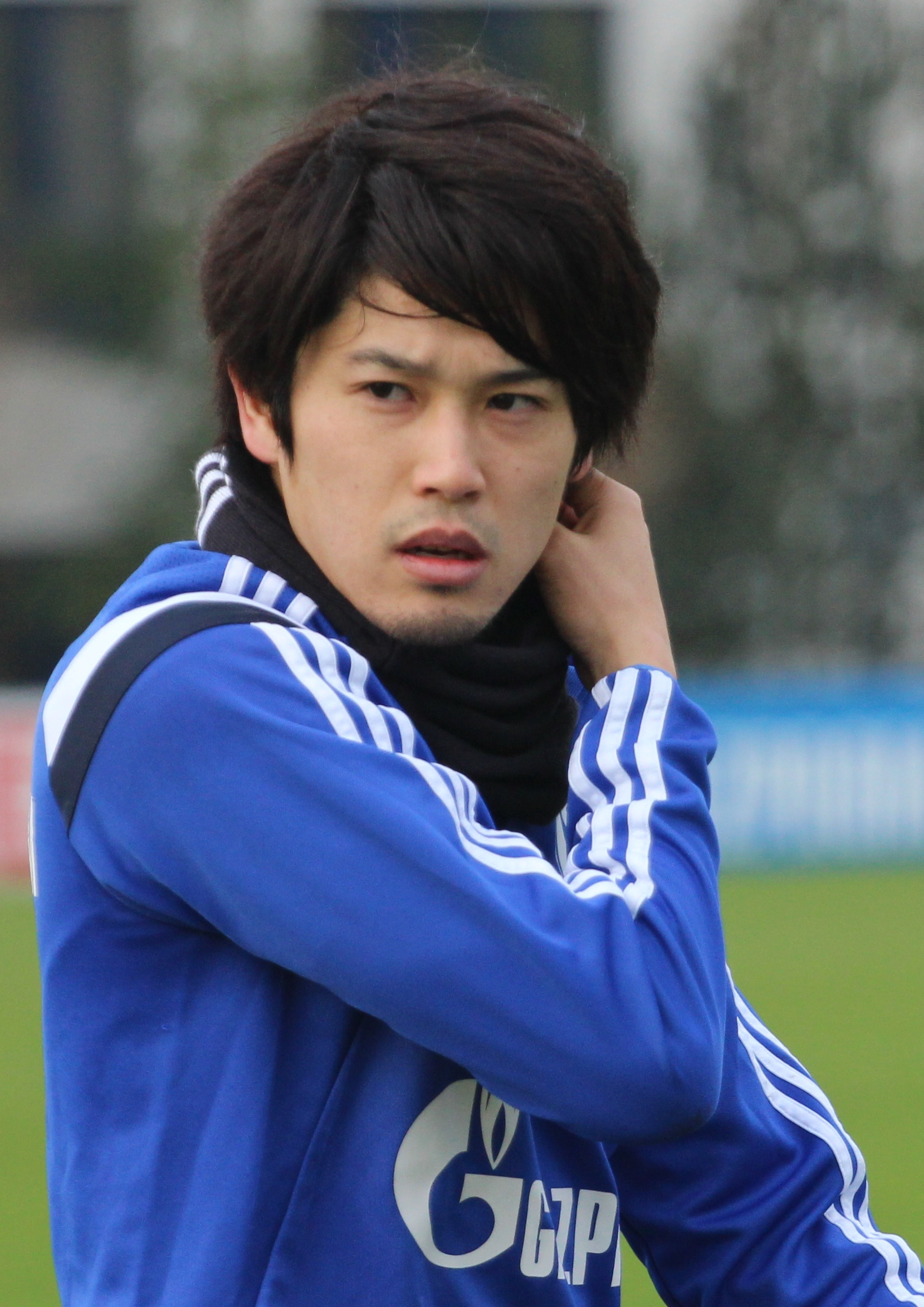
- Uchida in 2015

Personal information
- Full name: Atsuto Uchida
- Date of birth: 27 March 1988 (age 38)
- Place of birth: Kannami, Shizuoka, Japan
- Height: 1.76 m (5 ft 9 in)
- Position: Right-back

Youth career
- 2003–2005: Shimizu Higashi High School

Senior career*
Years	Team	Apps	(Gls)
2006–2010	Kashima Antlers	124	(3)
2010–2017	Schalke 04	104	(1)
2017–2018	Union Berlin	2	(0)
2018–2020	Kashima Antlers	24	(0)
Total		252	(4)

International career
2005–2007	Japan U20	12	(0)
2007–2008	Japan U23	8	(0)
2008–2015	Japan	74	(2)
Medal record
Kashima Antlers
Winner	AFC Champions League	2018
Winner	J1 League	2007
Winner	J1 League	2008
Winner	J1 League	2009
Runner-up	J.League Cup	2006
Winner	Emperor's Cup	2007
Winner	Emperor's Cup	2010
Schalke
Runner-up	DFL-Supercup	2010
Winner	DFB-Pokal	2011
Winner	DFL-Supercup	2011
Representing Japan
AFC Asian Cup
Gold medal – first place	2011 Qatar
AFC U-19 Championship
Silver medal – second place	2006 India
- * Club domestic league appearances and goals

Atsuto Uchida (内田 篤人, Uchida Atsuto; born 27 March 1988) is a Japanese former professional footballer who played as a right-back.

Uchida started his career with Kashima Antlers, making his debut in 2006 at the age of 17. After four years and three J1 League Titles, Uchida moved to Germany with Schalke 04 in 2010 for €1.3 million. With Schalke, Uchida won the 2010–11 DFB-Pokal, and was named in the Bundesliga team of the season twice from 2012 to 2014. He later played in the 2. Bundesliga with Union Berlin before returning to Japan with his first club Kashima Antlers, where he retired in 2020.

Uchida made his first appearance for the Japan national team in January 2008, and went on to make 74 appearances and score two goals for his country, representing them in the 2011 AFC Asian Cup, the 2013 FIFA Confederations Cup and the 2014 FIFA World Cup.

== Club career ==
=== Kashima Antlers ===
Born in Kannami, Shizuoka, Japan, Uchida was educated at and played for Shimizu Higashi High School. During his time there, he played mainly in the wing position, partly because of his speed. The school's director Kazuo Umeda switched Uchida's position to the right–back position, in which he played for the remainder of his career. In 2006, Uchida moved to Kashima Antlers with a high school diploma.

On 5 March 2006, Uchida made his professional football career for Kashima Antlers at the age of 17 in the season-opener against Sanfrecce Hiroshima, since which he has remained a fixture in the starting eleven as a right–back. Uchida's first goal as a professional footballer came on 21 March 2006 when he scored against Ventforet Kofu. He then scored his second goal for the club, in a 4–2 win against FC Tokyo on 21 July 2006. However, Uchida was out on two separate occasions due to suspension and injury that saw him miss the J.League Cup final. At the end of the 2006 season, he went on to make forty–one appearances and scoring two times in all competitions. For his performance, Uchida was selected by popular vote to play in the 2006 J. League All-Star Soccer game.

In the 2007 season, Uchida continued to regain his first team place for the side, playing in the right–back position and helped Kashima Antlers go on a nine-match winning streak between 2 May 2007 and 23 June 2007. After missing one match due to his commitment in the FIFA U-20 World Cup, he made his return to the starting line–up, in a 1–0 win against Ventforet Kofu on 11 August 2007. Uchida later helped the club win the league for the first time since after beating Shimizu S-Pulse 3–0 in the last game of the season to regain their nine consecutive wins. While helping Kashima Antlers go on their nine consecutive wins, he was out on two separate occasions due to suspension and minor injury. In the final of the Emperor Cup, Uchida scored the opener in a 2–0 win over Sanfrecce Hiroshima to win the cup; resulting the club winning a double. For his performance, Uchida was selected by popular vote to play in the 2007 J. League All-Star Soccer game. At the end of the 2007 season, he went on to make forty–four appearances and scoring once in all competitions.

Uchida started the 2008 season when he started the whole game against Sanfrecce Hiroshima in the Japanese Super Cup, as Kashima Antlers lost 4–3 on penalties after the game finished 2–2 throughout extra time. Uchida also made his AFC Champions League debut, starting a match and played 76 minutes, in a 9–1 win against Krung Thai Bank on 12 March 2008. Seven days later on 19 March 2008, he set up two goals In his second AFC Champions League's appearance, in a 6–0 win against CLB Nam Định. Uchida helped the club kept two clean sheets in the first two league matches. However, during a 1–0 win against Beijing Guoan in the AFC Champions League, Uchida suffered a hip injury and was out for between two and three weeks. On 11 May 2008, he made his return to the starting line-up, playing 82 minutes, as Kashima Antlers loss 1–0 against Shimizu S-Pulse. Since returning from injury, Uchida quickly began playing in the receiver role later in the season. After missing four matches, due to his international commitment for the Summer Olympics, he returned to the starting line–up, in a 2–1 win against Vissel Kobe on 27 August 2008. Uchida then helped the club keep three consecutive clean sheets between 28 September 2008 and 4 October 2008. He scored his first goal of the season, scoring the winning and only goal of the game, in a 1–0 win against Oita Trinita on 23 November 2008. In the last four games of the season, Uchida helped Kashima Antlers kept four clean sheets in a row, including winning the league on the last game of the season. At the end of the 2008 season, he made 34 appearances and scoring once in all competitions. For his performance, Uchida was named J. League Best Eleven for the first time. He also signed a contract extension with the club, keeping him until 2012.

Ahead of the 2009 season, Uchida was linked a move away from Kashima Antlers, as several clubs from Europe were interested in signing him. In the Japanese Super Cup, he started the match and helped the club beat Gamba Osaka 2–0 to win match. Uchida set up a goal for Marquinhos, in a 2–0 win over Urawa Red Diamonds in the opening game of the season. He scored his first goal of the season, in a 4–1 win over Warriors in the AFC Champions League campaign on 8 April 2009. Since the start of the 2009 season, Uchida started every match in the right–back position until he was dropped from the squad for one match against JEF United Chiba on 2 May 2009, due to suffering from chronic fatigue. It came after when Uchida suffered fatigue and had to be substituted during a 5–0 win against Armed Forces on 22 April 2009. He returned to the starting line-up and played 69 minutes, in a 2–1 win against Shimizu S-Pulse on 10 May 2009. A month later against FC Seoul in the round of 16 AFC Champions League, Uchida missed the decisive in the penalty shootout, resulting in the opposition team going through to the next round after the game finished 2–2 throughout 120 minutes. Things went worst for him a week later on 5 July 2009 when he gave away a penalty for handball, resulting in him receiving a red card and was successfully converted by Juninho to give Kawasaki Frontale a lead, in an eventual 1–1 draw. After the match, manager Oswaldo de Oliveira defended Uchida. He returned to the starting line-up from a one match suspension, against Kawasaki Frontale in the first leg of the J. League Cup and set up the winning goal, in a 1–0 win. In a follow–up match, Uchida made his 100th appearance for Kashima Antlers, in a 2–2 draw against Shimizu S-Pulse. His performance halfway through the season attracted interests from an unknown Serie A clubs, who made a 3 million euros bid. Despite this, he continued to regain his first team place in the right–back position for the rest of the season. On the last game of the season, Uchida set up a goal for Shinzo Koroki to score the only goal in the game, in a 1–0 win over Urawa Red Diamonds, resulting in the club winning the league for the third time running. At the end of the 2009 season, he went on to make the total of 43 appearances and scoring once for the side. For his performance, Uchida was named J. League Best Eleven for the second time.

Ahead of the 2010 season, Uchida's performance continued to attract interests from European clubs. Amid the transfer move, he started the whole game and helped Kashima Antlers win the Japanese Super Cup after beating Gamba Osaka 5–3 on penalty shootout following the match being played throughout 120 minutes. At the start of the 2010 season, Uchida continued to feature in the first team in the right–back position for the club and helped Kashima Antlers continued to remain in a good form. On 30 March 2010, he scored his first goal of the season, in a 3–1 win over Persipura Jayapura. After missing one match due to a knee injury, Uchida returned to the starting line–up, in a 2–1 loss against Cerezo Osaka on 5 May 2010, in what turned out to be his last league appearance for Kashima Antlers. His last appearance for the club came on 12 May 2010, in a 1–0 loss against Pohang Steelers in the last 16 of the AFC Champions League. By the time he departed from Kashima Antlers, Uchida went on to make seventeen appearances and scoring once in all competitions.

=== Schalke 04 ===
On 13 June 2010, German club Schalke 04 announced that they had signed the Japanese international to a three-year contract for €1.3 million. It came after when the club sold Rafinha to Genoa.

Uchida made his Schalke 04 debut, starting the whole game, in a 2–0 loss against Bayern Munich in the DFL-Supercup. He made his league debut for the club in the opening game of the season, coming on as a second–half substitute for Joël Matip, in a 2–1 loss against Hamburger SV. However, he missed three match in early–September, due to an injury. But Uchida made his return from injury, coming on as a second–half substitute, in a 2–2 draw against Borussia Mönchengladbach on 25 September 2010. After returning to the first team, Manager Felix Magath commented on his performance, saying: "Uchida still lacks physical robustness, but he sets the best accents forward." Four days later, on 29 September 2010, Uchida made his Champions League debut for Schalke 04, starting the whole game, in a 2–0 win over Benfica. After missing one match, he made his first league start in the right–back position for the club, in a 2–2 draw against Stuttgart on 16 October 2010. Uchida helped Schalke 04's defence by keeping three consecutive clean sheets between 4 December 2010 and 18 December 2010. After missing out throughout January, due to international commitment for the 2011 AFC Asian Cup, he made his return to the starting line-up and helped the club's defence kept a clean sheet, in a 0–0 draw against Borussia Dortmund on 4 February 2011. This was followed up by helping Schalke 04 kept another clean sheet, in a 1–0 win against SC Freiburg. Following a 2–1 win against Eintracht Frankfurt on 12 March 2011, Uchida wore a shirt which in response to the Tōhoku earthquake and tsunami, saying: "Dear friends in Japan. Hoping that many lives will be saved. Let's stand together. This misfortune is very, very close to me. I keep in touch with Japan." Since returning to the first team, he managed to regain his first team place in the right–back position for the rest of the season. On 13 April 2011, Uchida made history by becoming the first Japanese footballer to play for a team that reached the semi-finals of the UEFA Champion's League by helping the club beat Inter Milan 7–4 on aggregate. Despite Schalke 04 failing to reach the UEFA Champions League final, he came on as a late second–half substitute for Peer Kluge to help Schalke 04 beat MSV Duisburg 5–0 in the DFB-Pokal Final. In his first season at the club, Uchida went on to make the total of 43 appearances in all competitions.

In the 2011–12 season, Uchida appeared on the substitute bench for the first three league matches and DFL-Supercup, with Marco Höger preferred. He soon made his first appearance of the season for Schalke 04, playing in the left–back position, as Schalke 04 lost 2–0 against HJK Helsinki on 18 August 2011 in the first leg of the UEFA Europa League Qualification Round. Uchida played 12 minutes after coming on as a substitute and managed to overcome the deficit by winning 6–1 to reach the group stage. Three days later on 28 August 2011, he finally made his first league appearance of the season, in a 1–0 win over Borussia Mönchengladbach. However, Uchida tore a muscle in his right thigh during training and was out for a month. On 3 November 2011, he made his return to the starting line-up, starting the whole game, in a 0–0 draw against AEK Larnaca in the UEFA Europa League group stage match. Throughout most of the 2011–12 season, Uchida and Höger competed over the right–back position, although he suffered his own injury concern himself. Later in the 2011–12 season, he managed to regain his first team place at Schalke 04 after Höger began to play in the right–midfield position. The club's general manager Horst Heldt commented on his performance, saying: "We have already started discussions on this. He has a top attitude towards work and club. Uchida was "not yet finished with his development." At the end of the 2011–12 season, he made the total of 26 appearances in all competitions.

Ahead of the 2012–13 season, it was announced by Schalke 04 that Uchida signed a two-year professional contract extension to 30 June 2015. He was featured in the first two league matches before dropped in favour of Benedikt Höwedes. For the next two months, Uchida returned to the starting line-up, playing in the right–back position. On 3 November 2012, he scored his first goal for the club, in a 3–2 loss against 1899 Hoffenheim. However, he suffered a muscle injury and was out for two weeks. After missing two matches due to injury, Uchida returned to the starting line-up, in a 1–1 draw against Eintracht Frankfurt on 24 November 2012. He managed to regain his first team place for the next seven matches before suffering from injuries for the second time this season. On 9 March 2013, Uchida returned to the starting line-up and played a vital role in the Revierderby against Borussia Dortmund, setting up two goals in a 2–1 win. Following this, he went to regain his first team place for the remaining matches of the 2012–13 season and helped Schalke 04 to finish fourth place, therefore qualifying for the UEFA Champions League next season. At the end of the 2012–13 season, made the total of 30 appearances and scoring once in all competitions. For his performance, Uchida was named Bundesliga Team of the Season.

In the 2013–14 season, Uchida started in the first two league matches before suffering a muscle injury, which he made a quick recovery. On 21 August 2013, Uchida made his return from injury, starting the whole game, in a 1–1 draw against PAOK in the first leg of the UEFA Champions League Play–Offs Round; after the match, German newspaper Der Westen gave him a lowest score of the game. In a return leg, he set up the open goal of the game for Ádám Szalai, in a 3–2 win over PAOK to help the club reach the group stage of the Champions League. A month later, he scored his first UEFA Champions League goal, in a 3–0 win against Steaua București on 18 September 2013. In a match against Augsburg on 5 October 2013, he set up two goals for the club, in a 4–1 win. Following his return, Uchida regained his first team place for the side, playing in the right–back position. However, by between mid–December and February, he found himself out on two separate occasions, due to injury and suspension. Uchida, however, suffered a torn tendon during a 2–0 win over Hannover 96 on 9 February 2014, resulting in him out for the rest of the season. At the end of the 2013–14 season, he went on to make a total of 27 appearances and scoring once in all competitions. By May, Uchida managed to recover from his injury, just in time for him to be picked for the World Cup.

However at the start of the 2014–15 season, Uchida suffered a patella tendon irritation. On 23 September 2014, he returned to the first team from injury, starting the whole game, in a 3–0 win over Werder Bremen. After the match, Manager Jens Keller praised Uchida's performance, saying: "Great respect for Uchida. He did not play for seven months and then delivers such a game – really great!" After a good performance since returning from injury, Uchida signed a three–year contract, keeping him until 2018. Shortly after signing a contract, he set up a goal for Huntelaar to score the only goal in the game, in a 1–0 win over Augsburg on 31 October 2014. By the end of the Month, Uchida was awarded October's Player of the Month for his performance. Since returning to the first team from injury, he continued to regain his first team place, playing in the right–back position. Towards the end of the 2014–15 season, Uchida soon found himself as a part-time player and was demoted to the substitute bench. However, he was eventually injured on two occasions, including another Patella problems that kept him out for the rest of the season. At the end of the 2014–15 season, Uchida went on to make the total of 20 appearances in all competitions.

However, ahead of the 2015–16 season, Uchida undergone an operation on his patellar tendons, which saw him sidelined for six weeks. By October, he revealed his recovery but hasn't confirm the date of his return. Uchida was able to return to training January but it was short–lived when he suffered a knee injury that saw him out for the rest of the season.

Ahead of the 2016–17 season, Uchida returned to training in the pre–season tour. However, his return to training was short–lived when he suffered two injuries on two separate occasions between August and November. But on 7 December 2016, Uchida made his first appearance for Schalke 04, coming on as a late substitute, in a 2–0 loss against Red Bull Salzburg in the UEFA Europa League match. This turns out to be his only appearance in the 2016–17 season, as he suffered injuries once more. By the time Uchida left Schalke 04, he made 153 appearances and scoring two times in all competitions. On 10 September 2017, Uchida was given a farewell send-off before a Schalke 04 match.

=== Union Berlin ===
On 21 August 2017, Uchida joined 2. Bundesliga side Union Berlin on a one-year contract. Schalke allowed him to leave on a free transfer and "accommodated him financially" following his seven-year stay at the club.

Uchida made his Union Berlin debut on 10 September 2017, coming on as a 75th-minute substitute, and assisted for his club's temporary 2–1 lead three minutes later, an own goal by Kaan Ayhan, in a 3–2 loss against Fortuna Düsseldorf. On 19 September, he made his first start in a 1–0 loss against SV Sandhausen. Uchida played no further match before he sustained a thigh injury in mid-October. Having made just two appearances before the winter break, Uchida left Union Berlin to return to his native Japan signing with former club Kashima Antlers. It came after when he wanted to return to his homeland country.

=== Return to Kashima Antlers ===
On 2 January 2018, Uchida re-joined J1 team Kashima Antlers after playing seven and a half years in Germany. Uchida is scheduled to join his teammates in Kashima on 9 January 2018, shortly before the start of the 2018 J1 season.

Uchida made his first Kashima Antlers’ appearance in eight years, starting a match and played 84 minutes, in a 0–0 draw against Shimizu S-Pulse in the opening game of the season. However, he soon suffered a thigh injury that kept him out for a month. On 14 April 2018, Uchida made his return from injury, starting a match and played 77 minutes, in a 2–0 win against Nagoya Grampus. He appeared in the next four matches, setting up two goals against Vissel Kobe on 25 April 2018 and V-Varen Nagasaki on 2 May 2018 that saw the club earn a total of four points in both matches. However, Uchida suffered a knee injury that saw him out for two months. On 11 July 2018, Uchida made his return from injury, starting the whole game, in a 4–1 win against Machida Zelvia. Following his return, he found himself in and out of the starting line-up, due to being on the substitute bench and facing his own injury concern. Uchida then played an important role when he scored the winning goal, in a 3–2 win against Suwon Samsung Bluewings on 3 October 2018; which in the return leg, Kashima Antlers drew 3–3, resulting in the club reaching the AFC Champions League Final for the first time. However, Uchida suffered a hamstring injury that kept him out for a month. While on the sidelines, Kashima Antlers won the AFC Champions League Final against Persepolis by beating them 2–0 aggregate to win the club's first AFC Champions League trophy. On 24 November 2018, he made his return from injury, coming on as a late substitute, in a 3–0 win against Vegalta Sendai. In the FIFA Club World Cup, Uchida played three times for Kashima Antlers, as the club finished fourth place in the tournament. At the end of the 2018 season, he went on to twenty–three appearances and scoring once in all competitions.

Ahead of the 2019 season, Uchida was appointed as the new Kashima Antlers’ captain following the departure of Gen Shoji. His first match as captain for the club came on 1 March 2019 against Kawasaki Frontale and set up an equalising goal for Sho Ito, in a 1–1 draw. He later captained three more matches for Kashima Antlers between 9 March 2019 and 30 March 2019, helping the club earn a total of seven points. However, during a 3–2 win against Júbilo Iwata on 30 March 2019, Uchida suffered a knee injury and was substituted that kept him out for several months. On 14 August 2019, he made his return from injury, coming on as a late substitute, in a 4–0 win against Tochigi SC in the third round of the Emperor's Cup. Since returning from injury, Uchida resumed his captaincy role despite being placed on the substitute bench in a number of matches for the rest of the 2019 season. He helped Kashima Antlers finish third place in the league. At the end of the 2019 season, Uchida went on to make twelve appearances in all competitions.

At the start of the 2020 season, Uchida appeared as an unused substitute for the AFC Champions League against Melbourne Victory on 28 January 2020, as Kashima Antlers lost 1–0. Shortly after, he suffered a calf injury during a friendly match against Mito HollyHock on 1 February 2020, as the club won 1–0. After the match, it was announced that Uchida was sidelined for four weeks. However, the season was interrupted due to the pandemic and it was pushed back to July, allowing him to have more time to recover. Once the league resumed, he made his first appearance of the season, starting a match and played 60 minutes before being substituted, in a 2–1 loss against Kawasaki Frontale on 4 July 2020. A month later on 12 August 2020, Uchida captained the club for the first time this season, starting the match and played 69 minutes before being substituted, in a 3–2 win against Shimizu S-Pulse in a J.League Cup match. Eight days later on 20 August 2020, he announced his retirement from professional football. Three days later on 23 August 2020, Uchida made his last appearance in professional football against Gamba Osaka, coming on as a 16th-minute substitute for the injured Rikuto Hirose, as Kashima Antlers drew 1–1. After the match, he spoke at his retirement ceremony, thanking the club and hope the new generation would hear his story in hopes of becoming a professional football. Following this, Uchida went on to make three appearances in all competitions.

== Post-playing career ==
Following his retirement from professional football, Uchida moved to coaching when he was appointed as a role model coach for Japan U19. However, Uchida previously ruled out being a manager, citing as leadership to be difficult.

On 28 March 2021, Uchida was hired as a sportscaster for TV Asahi's "Hodo Station". His first day of the job took place on 31 March 2021. Uchida was appointed as Schalke's team ambassador and LIXIL ambassador. On 22 September 2022, he was appointed as a football committee for the J1 League.

On May 18, 2026 Uchida was announced as the new head coach of Nadeshiko Japan.

== International career ==
=== Youth team ===
Uchida represented Japan at several underage levels. Uchida was part of the Japan team for the 2006 AFC Youth Championship finals hosted by India. He helped the Japan's defence with two clean sheets in the first two matches in the group stage, which saw the side through to the knockout stage. Uchida later helped Japan reach the finals of the AFC Youth Championship by beating South Korea and Saudi Arabia. However, Japan finished runners-up after losing to North Korea on penalties.

Uchida also took part in the 2007 FIFA U-20 World Cup finals hosted by Canada. He played his first match of the tournament and helped the side beat Scotland 2–1. This was followed up by helping Japan keep a clean sheet in the next two matches, which saw them go through to the knockout stage. However, the national side were eliminated by Czech Republic after losing on penalties.

In July 2008, Uchida was called up to Japan U23 squad for the 2008 Summer Olympics. He played his first match of the tournament, starting the whole game, as Japan U23 lost 1–0 against United States. Uchida went on to make two appearances for the side in the tournament, as Japan were eliminated in the group stage.

=== Senior team ===
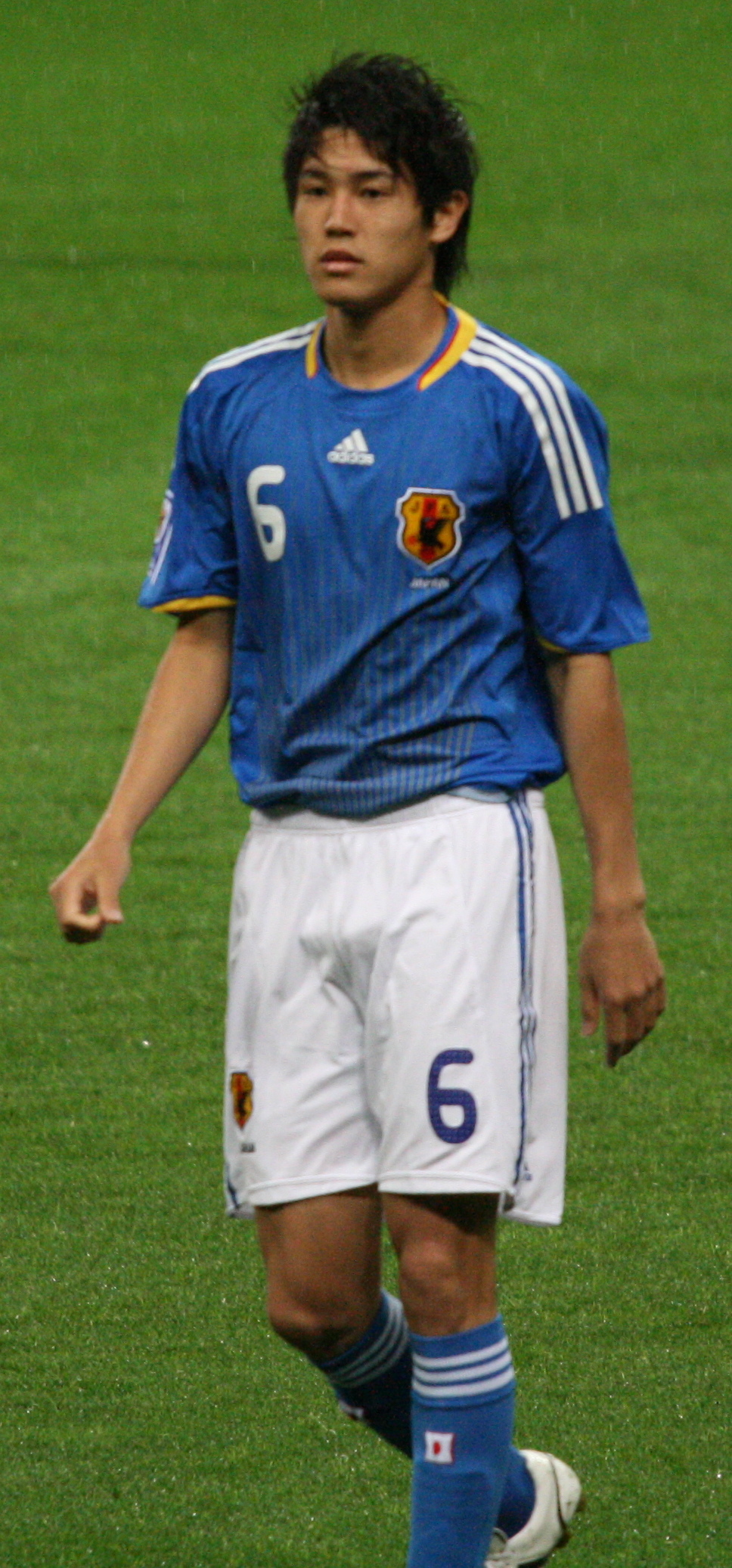
Uchida playing for the Japan national team.

Uchida received an international call-up on two occasions for the Japan national team squad from national coach Ivica Osim between December 2007 and January 2008 but he did not play any game. Uchida finally made a full international debut for the Samurai Blue on 26 January 2008 in a friendly against Chile at National Olympic Stadium in Tokyo. This was the first match under the reign of new manager Takeshi Okada, as Japan drew 0–0. In a follow–up match against Bosnia and Herzegovina, he played full 90 minutes for the Samurai Blue and keep another clean sheet, in a 3–0 win. On 6 February 2008, Uchida played 90 minutes for Japan in a 4–1 win against Thailand and became the first teenage Japanese footballer to play FIFA World Cup qualification after the establishment of the J. League in 1993. On 22 June 2008, he scored the winner in a 1–0 win against Bahrain. It was his first international goal and Uchida became the youngest Japanese's goalscorer in FIFA World Cup qualification at age 20 years and 87 days, beating an 11-year-old record that was held by Hidetoshi Nakata. Throughout 2008, he dispatched the right–back position from Yūichi Komano.

Uchida started 2009 well when he set up two goals, in a 5–1 win against Finland on 5 February 2009. In June 2009, Uchida was featured in two of the three World Cup qualifying matches, which resulted in the Samurai Blue qualified for the tournament. Later in the year, Uchida helped Japan keep four consecutive clean sheets between 10 October 2009 and 18 November 2009, all of them were friendly matches.

In February 2010, Uchida was called up to the Japan's national squad for the East Asian Football Championship. He helped the Samurai Blue keep two clean sheets in the first two matches. However, Japan's loss to South Korea in Matchday 3 meant that the Samurai Blue finished third place in the tournament. In May 2010, Uchida was a member of the Japan team for the 2010 World Cup squad. However, he appeared as a substitute for all the World Cup matches after failing to dispatch a right–back place from Yūichi Komano. After the tournament, Uchida said he was disappointed in himself for not playing in the World Cup and hope his move to Schalke 04 would make him a better player.

In December 2010, Uchida was called up to the Japan's squad for the 2011 AFC Asian Cup in Qatar. He played all the first three matches in the tournament and helped the Samurai Blue reach the knockout stage. However, Uchida was suspended for the quarter–final against Qatar after being booked two times on different occasions. He returned to the starting line-up, playing against South Korea in the semi–finals and played the whole game, as Japan beat the opposition team 3–2 in the penalty shoot–out following the match being played for 120 minutes, in a 2–2 draw. In the AFC Asian Cup Final against Australia, Uchida started and played 120 minutes, as the Samurai Blue beat the Socceroos 1–0 to win the AFC Asian Cup, thanks to Tadanari Lee.

Later in the year, he helped Japan keep three consecutive clean sheets between 7 June 2011 and 2 September 2011. Uchida, once again, helped the Samurai Blue keep three consecutive clean sheets between 23 May 2012 and 8 June 2012. On 4 June 2013, he later helped Japan qualify for the World Cup after drawing 1–1 against Australia on 4 June 2013. Shortly after, Uchida was called up to the Samurai Blue's squad for the 2013 Confederations Cup. He was featured three times in the tournament, as Japan loss all three matches and was eliminated in the group stage. At one point after losing to Brazil, Brazilian media gave Uchida's performance the lowest score out of the match.

In May 2014, Uchida was called up to Japan's squad for the 2014 World Cup. Prior to this, he was involved in three friendly matches, including scoring his second international goal for the Samurai Blue against Cyprus on 27 May 2014. Unlike the previous World Cup, Uchida started all three matches in the World Cup, which saw Japan eliminated from the group stage earning one point in a 0–0 draw against Greece on 20 June 2014. Following Japan's elimination, Uchida hinted about retirement from the Samurai Blue. A month later, he later reflected about playing in the World Cup.

Expecting to be picked for the AFC Asian Cup, Uchida, however, was cut from the Japan's squad ahead of the tournament. It was revealed that he was recovering from his injury. Following the conclusion of the Asian Cup, he didn't get a call cup from the Samurai Blue until on 19 March 2015 for the Kirin Challenge Cup. Uchida played two times in the tournament, winning both matches. Following the conclusion of the Kirin Challenge Cup, he spoke about his hopes of making a return to the Japan's call–ups but this never happened.

== Personal life ==
Outside of football, Uchida is considered a massively popular figure in his native country of Japan. During a match against 1. FC Nürnberg on 26 February 2011, 90 women from Japan visited the Veltins-Arena to see Uchida play, and his popularity has led to him being referred to as a Japanese Beckham. Uchida's popularity during his time at Schalke 04 led to the club launching an official Japanese website and Twitter account. German newspaper Der Westen mentioned his popularity and that he could earn a cult following at Schalke 04.

Outside of football, Uchida provided the voice for Uschi, who is named after him, in the Pokémon movie Diancie and the Cocoon of Destruction. He does not drink alcohol, preferring to drink banana juice. Growing up, Uchida said his favourite manga was Captain Tsubasa and supported Júbilo Iwata. Since May 2015, Uchida has been married to Yuko Aoki, whom he has known since childhood, and together, the couple has three daughters.

Earlier in his football career, Uchida said he was considering enrolling to university to obtain a teacher's license. In April 2016, Uchida and his teammate Yuya Osako opened a football training facility in Kashima. Three years later in June, the pair released an exercise book. During his Japan's career, teammate Maya Yoshida claimed that he is best friends with Uchida, yet a fellow competitor.

In December 2008, Uchida affiliated himself with FIFA Players' Agent Tetsuro Kiyooka, in hopes of moving to Europe. It worked when he joined Schalke 04 two years later after becoming Kiyooka's client. During his time at Schalke 04, Uchida lived in Düsseldorf.

== Career statistics ==
=== Club ===
As of 23 August 2020

Appearances and goals by club, season and competition
Club	Season	League			National cup (Note: Includes Emperor's Cup and DFB-Pokal)		League cup (Note: Includes J.League Cup)		Continental (Note: Includes AFC Champions League, UEFA Champions League and UEFA Europa League.)		Other (Note: Includes 2018 FIFA Club World Cup, Japanese Super Cup and DFL-Supercup)		Total	
Club	Season	Division	Apps	Goals	Apps	Goals	Apps	Goals	Apps	Goals	Apps	Goals	Apps	Goals
Kashima Antlers	2006	J1 League	28	2	3	0	10	0	—		—		41	2
Kashima Antlers	2007	J1 League	31	0	5	1	8	0	—		—		44	1
Kashima Antlers	2008	J1 League	25	1	1	0	1	0	6	0	1	0	34	1
Kashima Antlers	2009	J1 League	31	0	2	0	2	0	7	1	1	0	43	1
Kashima Antlers	2010	J1 League	9	0	—		—		7	1	1	0	17	1
Kashima Antlers	Total		124	3	11	1	21	0	20	2	3	0	179	6
Schalke 04	2010–11	Bundesliga	26	0	5	0	—		11	0	1	0	43	0
Schalke 04	2011–12	Bundesliga	18	0	0	0	—		8	0	—		26	0
Schalke 04	2012–13	Bundesliga	24	1	1	0	—		5	0	—		30	1
Schalke 04	2013–14	Bundesliga	17	0	2	0	—		8	1	—		27	1
Schalke 04	2014–15	Bundesliga	19	0	0	0	—		7	0	—		26	0
Schalke 04	2015–16	Bundesliga	0	0	0	0	—		0	0	—		0	0
Schalke 04	2016–17	Bundesliga	0	0	0	0	—		1	0	—		1	0
Schalke 04	Total		104	1	8	0	—		40	1	1	0	153	2
Union Berlin	2017–18	2. Bundesliga	2	0	0	0	—		—		—		2	0
Kashima Antlers	2018	J1 League	12	0	2	0	2	0	4	1	3	0	23	1
Kashima Antlers	2019	J1 League	10	0	1	0	1	0	0	0	—		12	0
Kashima Antlers	2020	J1 League	2	0	-		1	0	0	0	—		3	0
Kashima Antlers	Total		24	0	3	0	3	0	5	1	3	0	38	1
Career total			254	4	22	1	25	0	64	4	7	0	372	9

=== International ===
As of 11 June 2015

Appearances and goals by national team and year
National team	Year	Apps	Goals
Japan U20	2005	2	0
Japan U20	2006	6	0
Japan U20	2007	4	0
Total		12	0
Japan U23	2007	4	0
Japan U23	2008	4	0
Total		8	0
Japan	2008	14	1
Japan	2009	13	0
Japan	2010	7	0
Japan	2011	11	0
Japan	2012	7	0
Japan	2013	13	0
Japan	2014	7	1
Japan	2015	2	0
Total		74	2

Scores and results list Japan's goal tally first, score column indicates score after each Uchida goal.

List of international goals scored by Atsuto Uchida
No.	Date	Venue	Opponent	Score	Result	Competition
1	22 June 2008	Saitama Stadium, Saitama, Japan	Bahrain	1–0	1–0	2010 FIFA World Cup Qualification
2	27 May 2014	Saitama Stadium, Saitama, Japan	Cyprus	1–0	1–0	Friendly

== Honours ==
Kashima Antlers

- J. League Division 1: 2007, 2008, 2009
- Emperor's Cup: 2007
- Japanese Super Cup: 2009, 2010
- AFC Champions League: 2018

Schalke 04

- DFB-Pokal: 2010–11
- DFL-Supercup: 2011

Japan

- AFC Asian Cup: 2011

Individual

- J.League Best XI: 2008, 2009
- Bundesliga Team of the Season: 2012–13, 2013–14
- J.League 30th Anniversary Team
