= Yasuki =

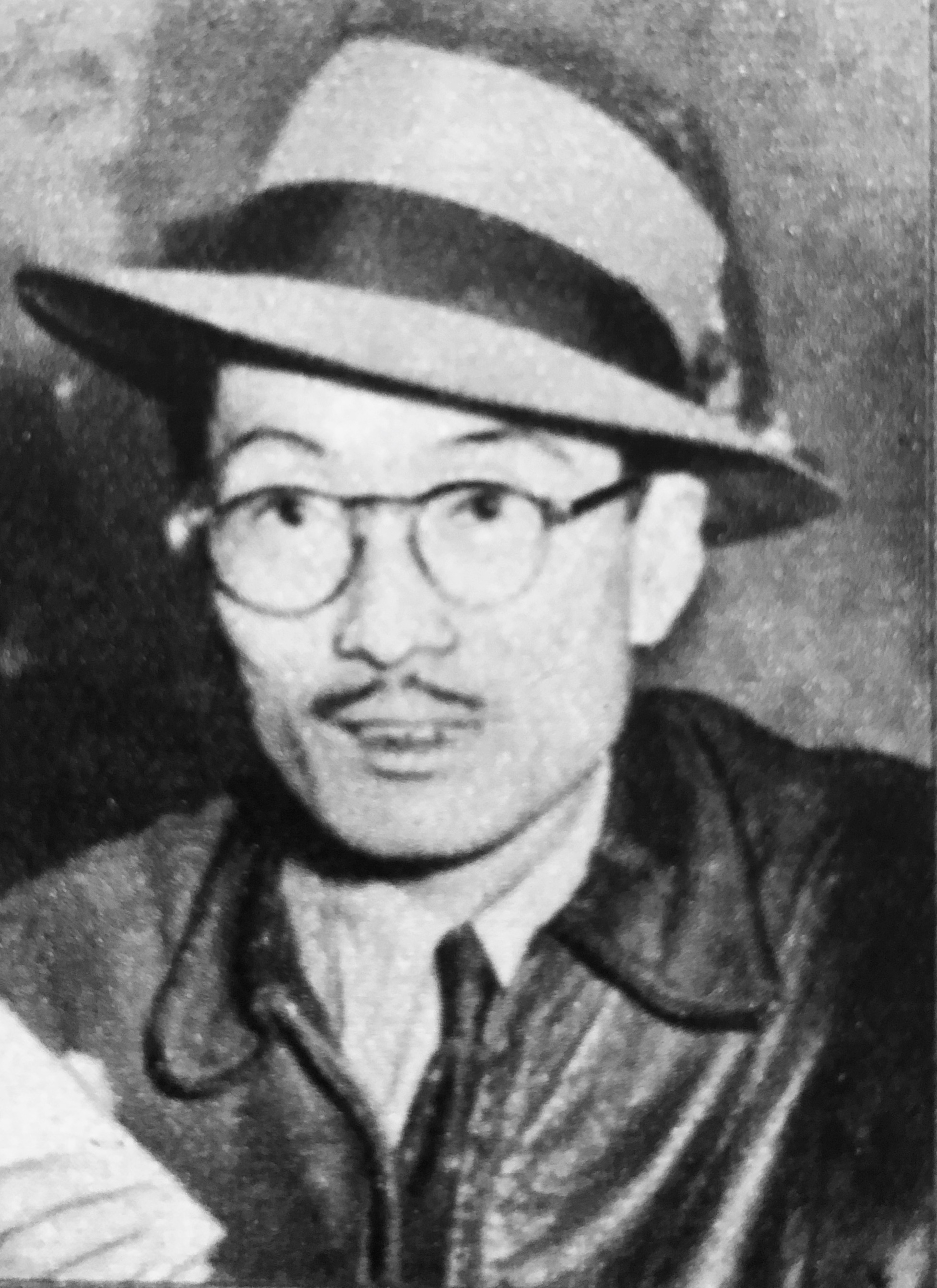
- Yasuki Chiba (1910–1985), director and actor
- Pronunciation: jasɯkʲi (IPA)
- Gender: Male

Origin
- Origin: Japanese
- Meaning: Different meanings depending on the kanji used

Yasuki is a masculine Japanese given name.

== Written forms ==
Yasuki can be written using many different combinations of kanji characters. Here are some examples:

- 康樹, "healthy, tree"
- 康機, "healthy, opportunity/machine"
- 康基, "healthy, foundation"
- 康輝, "healthy, sparkle"
- 康起, "healthy, rise/wake up"
- 靖樹, "peaceful, tree"
- 靖機, "peaceful, opportunity/machine"
- 靖基, "peaceful, foundation"
- 靖輝, "peaceful, sparkle"
- 靖起, "peaceful, rise/wake up"
- 安樹, "tranquil, tree"
- 安機, "tranquil, opportunity/machine"
- 安輝, "tranquil, sparkle"
- 保樹, "preserve, tree"
- 保機, "preserve, opportunity/machine"
- 保輝, "preserve, sparkle"
- 泰樹, "peaceful, tree"
- 泰機, "peaceful, opportunity/machine"
- 泰輝, "peaceful, sparkle"
- 易機, "divination, opportunity/machine"
- 易起, "divination, rise/wake up"

The name can also be written in hiragana やすき or katakana ヤスキ.

== Notable people with the name ==
- Yasuki Chiba (千葉 泰樹, 1910–1985) Japanese director and actor
- Yasuki Hiramatsu (平松 保城; 1926–2012), Japanese artist
- Yasuki Ishidate (石舘 靖樹; born 1984), Japanese footballer
- Yasuki Kimoto (木本 恭生; born 1993), Japanese footballer
