= Maya Yoshida =

Japanese footballer (born 1988)

Maya Yoshida 吉田 麻也
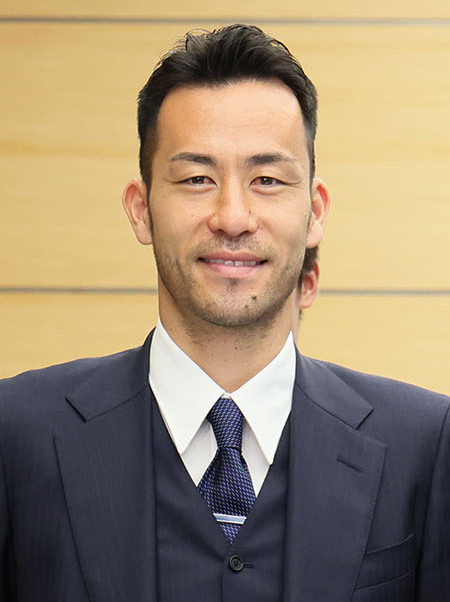
- Yoshida at the Kantei in 2022

Personal information
- Full name: Maya Yoshida
- Date of birth: 24 August 1988 (age 38)
- Place of birth: Nagasaki, Japan
- Height: 1.89 m (6 ft 2 in)
- Position: Centre-back

Team information
- Current team: LA Galaxy
- Number: 4

Youth career
- 2001–2006: Nagoya Grampus

Senior career*
Years	Team	Apps	(Gls)
2007–2010	Nagoya Grampus	71	(5)
2010–2012	VVV-Venlo	54	(5)
2012–2020	Southampton	154	(6)
2020	→ Sampdoria (loan)	14	(0)
2020–2022	Sampdoria	58	(3)
2022−2023	Schalke 04	29	(0)
2023–	LA Galaxy	97	(7)

International career
2008	Japan U23	10	(1)
2012–2021	Japan Olympic (O.P.)	12	(1)
2010–2026	Japan	127	(12)
Medal record
Men's football
Representing Japan
AFC Asian Cup
Winner	2011 Qatar
Runner-up	2019 United Arab Emirates
- * Club domestic league appearances and goals as of 25 October 2026

Maya Yoshida (吉田 麻也, Yoshida Maya; born 24 August 1988) is a Japanese professional footballer who captains and plays as a centre-back for Major League Soccer club LA Galaxy.

Yoshida formerly played for the Japan national team, making over 120 appearances. He was a member of the side's squads for the FIFA World Cup in 2014, 2018 and 2022, and the AFC Asian Cup in 2011, 2015 and 2019, winning the latter tournament in 2011 and finishing as runner-up in 2019. He was additionally part of Japan's Olympic football team at the 2008, 2012 and 2020 games.

== Club career ==
=== Nagoya Grampus ===
Born in Nagasaki, Japan, Yoshida began playing football at Nanling FC in his second year at elementary school. His older brother, Honami, played an important role in starting his football career when he searched on the internet for Nagoya Grampus's U-15 team and this led Yoshida to join the U-15 team. Once Yoshida joined, he relocated to Nagoya to be close at Nagoya Grampus and attended Toyota High School.

After spending five years at Nagoya Grampus Youth Academy, he was promoted to the first team in the 2007 season, having signed his first professional contract. Yoshida joined the club's first team training soon after and started out as a defensive midfielder while playing for Nagoya Grampus's youth team, but was converted to centre back. After spending months on the substitute bench, Yoshida finally made his debut for the club, coming on as a second-half substitute, in a 2–1 loss against Oita Trinita on 3 May 2007. Since then, he became a first team regular for Nagoya Grampus, playing in the centre–back position. On 5 November 2007, Yoshida scored his first goal for the club, in a 3–1 win against Thespa Kusatsu in the fourth round of the Emperor's Cup. At the end of the 2007 season, he went on to make twenty–four appearances and scoring once in all competitions.

In the 2008 season, Yoshida began to feature in the starting line-up for most of the league matches, forming a centre–back partnership with his Serbian teammate Miloš Bajalica. He started the season well when he helped Nagoya Grampus go on an unbeaten run of seven matches in all competitions. Yoshida continued to feature in the first team until he was called up to the Japan U23 squad in July. After Japan U23's elimination in the Summer Olympics, it was not until 23 August 2008 that Yoshida returned to the starting line-up against Kashima Antlers and scored his first goal of the season, in a 2–1 win. However, he lost his first team place and found himself placed on the substitute bench for the next five matches. Yoshida's second goal then came on 2 November 2008 against FC Gifu in the fourth round of the Emperor's Cup and helped them win 1–0. By mid–October, he regained his first team place for the remaining matches of the season and helped the club finish third place in the league. For his performance, Yoshida won the Rookie of the Year at the 14th Aichi Toyota "Grand Pass Rankle Award". At the end of the 2008 season, he went on to make twenty–nine appearances and scoring two times in all competitions.

At the start of the 2009 season, Yoshida switched number shirt to four. He scored Nagoya Grampus's historical first goal in the AFC Champions League in the game against Ulsan Hyundai Horang-i, winning 3–1 on 10 March 2009. Yoshida continued to regain his first team place for the club, playing in the centre–back position. His second goal of the season came on 26 April 2009, scoring an equaliser goal, in a 2–1 win against Yokohama F. Marinos. However by early–July, he suffered a calf injury that saw him out for two weeks. Yoshida made his first team return for Nagoya Grampus on 18 July 2009, starting the match, in a 1–1 draw against Kyoto Sanga. He scored his third goal of the season, in a 2–1 win against FC Tokyo eleven days later on 29 July 2009, but the club was eliminated in the J.League Cup following a 6–3 on aggregate. Since returning to the first team from injury, Yoshida regained his first team place for the club's remaining matches of the 2009 season. He later added two more goals throughout September, scoring against Kashiwa Reysol and Kawasaki Frontale. The following month, Yoshida scored two more goals for Nagoya Grampus, coming against FC Tokyo and Yokohama F. Marinos. He scored his eighth goal of the season, in a 3–1 win against Júbilo Iwata in the fourth round of the Emperor's Cup. Yoshida later helped the club to reach the Emperor's Cup final after beating Shimizu S-Pulse 5–4 on penalty shoot–out following a 1–1 draw throughout 120 minutes. However, he started in the Emperor's Cup Final against Gamba Osaka, as Nagoya Grampus loss 4–1 in what turned out to be his last appearance for the club. At the end of the 2009 season, Yoshida went on to make forty–eight appearances and scoring eight times in all competitions.

=== VVV-Venlo ===
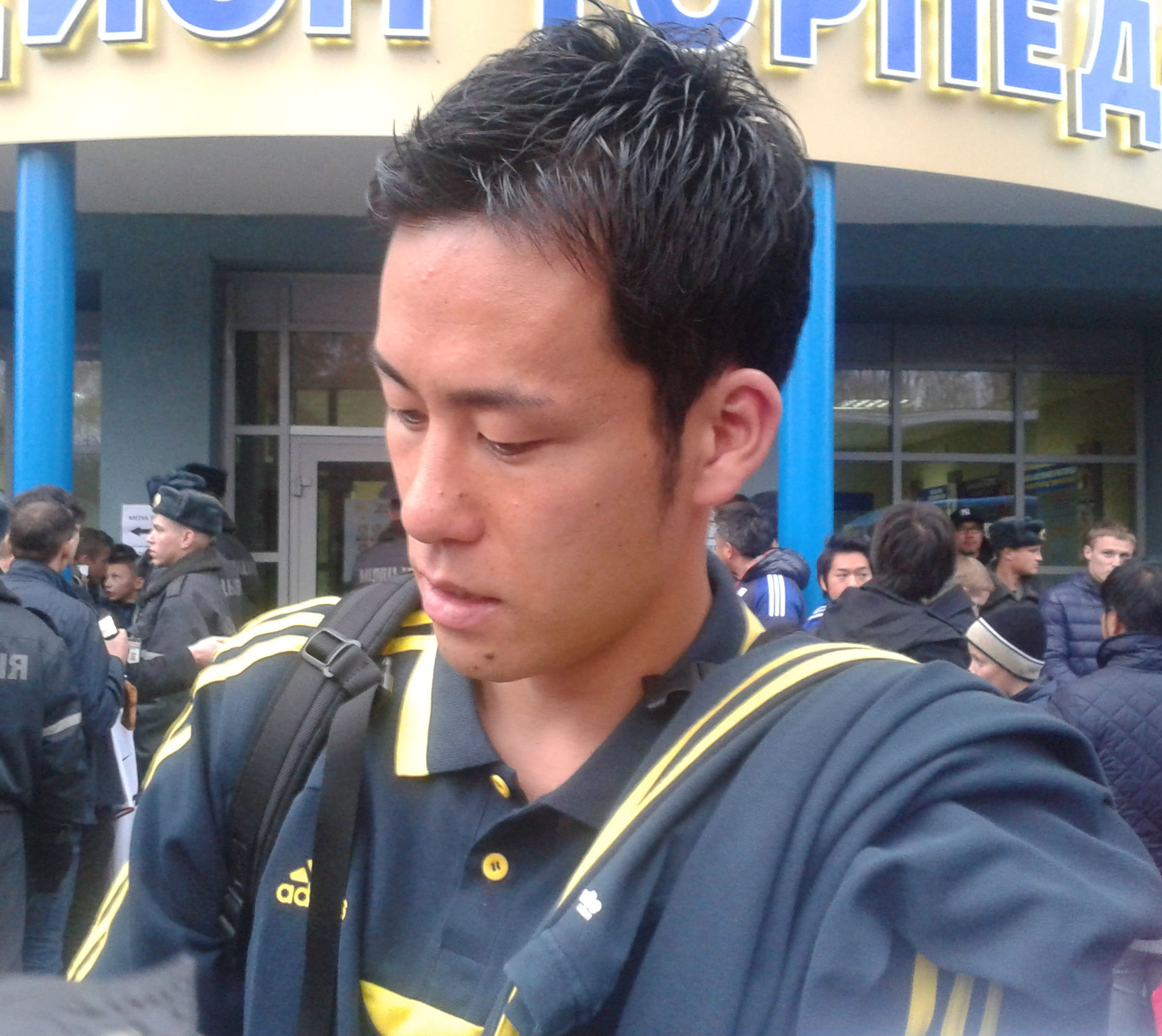
Yoshida pictured during his time at VVV-Venlo at the fan gatherings

In December 2009, it was announced that Yoshida had transferred to Dutch club VVV-Venlo, signing a three–year contract. He had desired to play for a club in Europe since he was young. Keisuke Honda, who was his teammate at Nagoya Grampus, introduced his agent, Tetsuro Kiyooka to support his future vision. Indeed, Yoshida followed the footsteps of Keisuke Honda who also played for VVV-Venlo before he joined them. However, Yoshida's start to VVV-Venlo career suffered a setback when he fractured his foot and left him out for the rest of the 2009–10 season.

At the start of the 2010–11 season, Yoshida continued to recover from his fractured foot. On 30 October 2010, he made his VVV-Venlo debut, coming on as a 75th-minute substitute, and set up the club's third goal of the game, in a 5–3 loss against FC Groningen. Since making his debut for VVV-Venlo, Yoshida quickly became a first team regular for the club. After spending January with Japan in the Asian Cup and winning the tournament, he made his first team return, starting the match, in a 3–0 win against NAC Breda on 5 February 2011. Yoshida later regained his first team place for the remaining matches of the season, as VVV-Venlo qualified for the relegation play–offs. He started all the four matches in the relegation play–offs and helped the club retain their Eredivisie league status. At the end of the 2010–11 season, Yoshida went on to make twenty–four appearances in all competitions.

At the start of the 2011–12 season, Yoshida continued to retain his first team place for VVV-Venlo, playing in the centre–back position. He scored a bicycle kick goal for VVV-Venlo off a corner kick on 11 September 2011 against PSV Eindhoven, as the match ended in a 3–3 draw. This goal was awarded as "Goal of the Season 2011–2012" of the Eredivisie. The Yoshida scored his second goal of the season, in a 4–1 win against RKC Waalwijk on 22 October 2011. On 18 February 2012, he scored his third goal of the season, in a 4–1 win against De Graafschap. Yoshida's fourth goal of the season came on 3 March 2012, in a 2–1 win against NAC Breda. He scored his fifth goal of the season against Roda JC, but was sent off in the 73rd minute for an unprofessional foul, in a 3–1 loss. After serving a two match suspension, Yoshida returned to the starting line-up, starting the match, in a 2–0 loss against PSV Eindhoven on 31 March 2012. He later started all the four matches in the relegation play–offs and helped the club retain their Eredivisie league status once again. Yoshida's experience in the relegation play–offs led him to write a blog about the subject. At the end of the 2011–12 season, Yoshida went on to make thirty–seven appearances and scoring five times in all competitions as a central defender.

In the 2012–13 season, Yoshida made two appearances for VVV-Venlo, including making his last appearance against ADO Den Haag on 25 August 2012, in which he set up the club's first goal of the game, losing 4–2.

=== Southampton ===
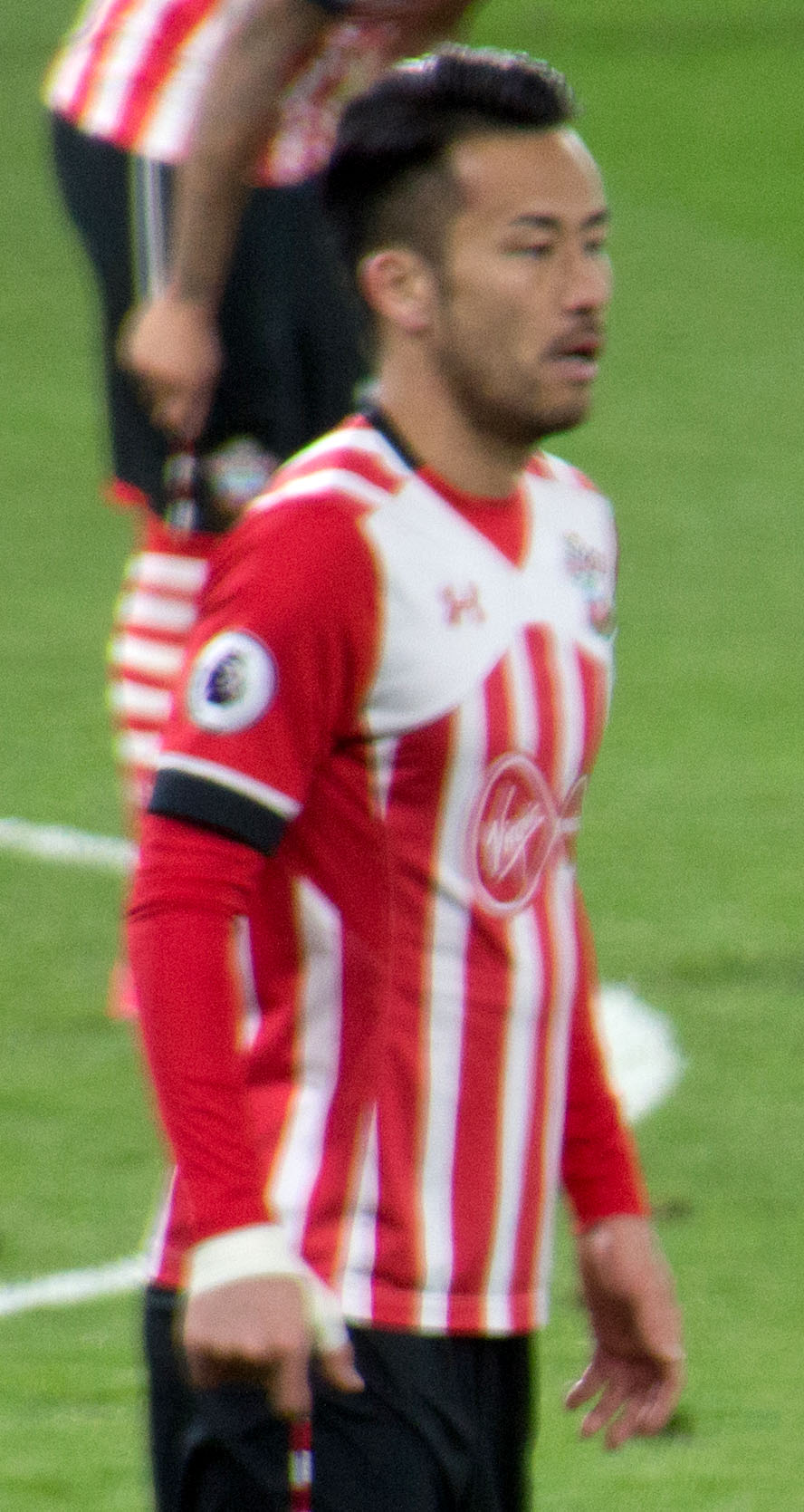
Yoshida playing for Southampton in 2017

On 30 August 2012, Yoshida agreed to join newly–promoted Premier League side Southampton on a three-year contract for a fee thought to be in the region of £3 million and was joined by his teammate, Tadanari Lee. Upon joining the club, he told the Southern Daily Echo that the move to England would help him grow as a player.

Yoshida made his debut for the Saints on 15 September 2012, against Arsenal in a 6–1 defeat, coming on as a 28th-minute substitute for Jos Hooiveld. He then made his home debut a week later on 22 September 2012 in a 4–1 win over Aston Villa, playing the whole 90 minutes. Since joining the club, Yoshida quickly became a first team regular, playing in the centre–back position and forming a partnership with José Fonte. During a 1–1 draw against Swansea City on 10 November 2012, Yoshida made a poor control to the ball that led to Nathan Dyer scoring an equaliser. Despite, he continued to retain his first team place against Queens Park Rangers and helped them win 3–1 on 15 November 2012. Along the way, he was rotated to playing in the left–back and right–back positions. Since making his debut for Southampton, Yoshida started in every match for the Saints and helped improve the results on both the club and the player, himself. Having started the 2012–13 season at the bottom of the table, results improved and he helped Southampton avoid relegation by finishing fourteenth place. In his first season at Southampton, he went on to make thirty–four appearances in all competitions.

However at the start of the 2013–14 season, Yoshida's first team opportunities became limited under the management of Mauricio Pochettino and he found himself on the substitute bench. Despite this, he made his first appearance of the season, in a 5–1 win against Barnsley on 27 August 2013. Yoshida then scored his first goal for Southampton in a 2–1 defeat to Sunderland in the League Cup on 6 November 2013. A month later on 4 December 2013, he made his first Premier League appearance, starting the match, in a 3–2 loss against Aston Villa. At the start of January, Yoshida had a first team run in following an injury to Dejan Lovren, starting the next six matches as the results improved. He scored his first Premier League goal in a 3–1 defeat at West Ham United on 22 February 2014 after a Steven Davis free kick. But following Lovren's return, he was once again behind the pecking order in the centre–back competitions, as well as, his own injury concerns. At the end of the 2013–14 season, Yoshida went on to make fourteen appearances and scoring two times in all competitions.

At the start of the 2014–15 season, Yoshida regained his first team place, playing in the centre–back position, following Lovren's departure. However, during a 1–0 win against Swansea City on 20 September 2014, he suffered ankle injury and was substituted in the second half, resulting in him out for four weeks. Although Yoshida returned from injury, he was placed on the substitute bench until on 30 November 2014 against Manchester City, coming on as a second–half substitute, in a 3–0 loss. His next goal came on 20 December 2014, in a 3–0 victory over Everton, with Steven Davis again providing the assist. Two weeks later on 8 January 2015, Southampton announced that Yoshida and the club had agreed terms to an extension of his contract until 2018. After spending January with Japan's campaign at the AFC Asian Cup, he returned to the starting line-up and played the whole game, in a 1–0 loss against Swansea City on 1 February 2015. In a follow–up match against Queens Park Rangers, Yoshida played an important role in the game when he set up the only goal of the game, in a 1–0 win. Towards the end of the season, he found himself in and out of the starting line-up in the first team and demoted on the substitute bench. Despite this, Yoshida helped the club finish seventh place in the league, resulting in their qualifying for the UEFA Europa League next season. At the end of the 2014–15 season, he went on to make twenty–three appearances and scoring once in all competitions.

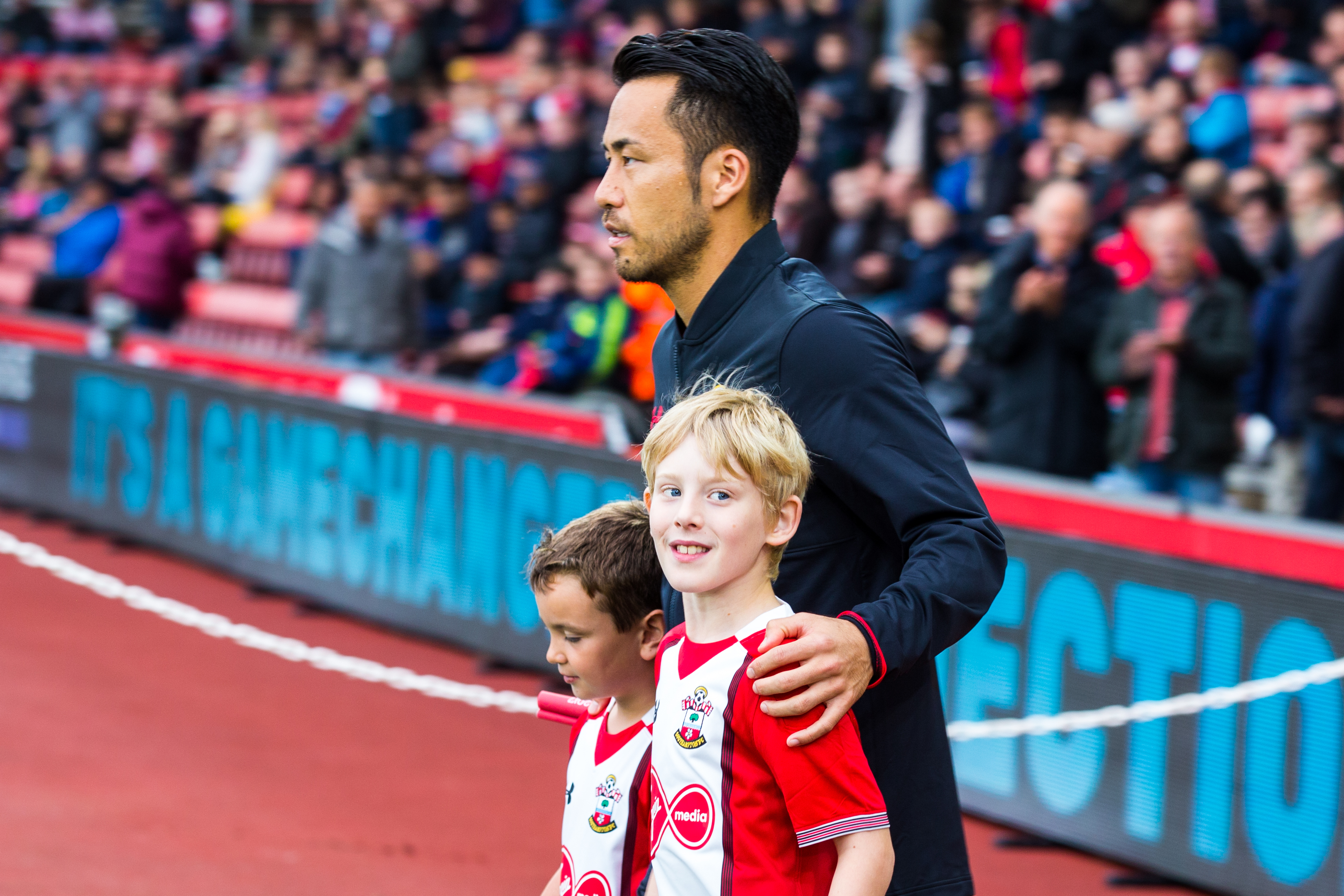
Yoshida pictured with the young mascots ahead of a friendly match against FC Augsburg in 2017

At the start of the 2015–16 season, Yoshida started the season well when he helped a clean sheet in both legs by beating Vitesse 5–0 on aggregate in the third round of the UEFA Europa League. However, Yoshida was unable to help Southampton reach the group stage of the tournament after losing 2–1 on aggregate against Midtjylland. Despite this, Yoshida helped the club keep three consecutive clean sheets between 23 August 2015 and 23 September 2015. Having started playing in the centre–back position, he played in the right–back position, due to increase competitions among the centre–backs. During a match against Manchester United on 21 September 2015, Yoshida was at fault when his back pass backfired, allowing Anthony Martial to score, as Southampton loss 3–2. Following this, Yoshida mostly appeared for the club from the substitute bench, due to strong competitions in the defence. On 28 October 2015, he scored his first goal of the 2015–16 season with a 20-yard strike against Aston Villa in the League Cup. Yoshida's second goal of the season came on 6 February 2016 in a 1–0 victory at St. Mary's over West Ham United. The club later finished sixth place in the league, resulting their qualification of the UEFA Europa League once again next season. At the end of the 2015–16 season, he went on to make twenty–seven appearances and scoring two times in all competitions.

At the start of the 2016–17 season, Yoshida started the match against Watford in the opening game of the season, resulting a 1–1 draw. However, he became a backup in the club's centre–back position behind Virgil van Dijk and Fonte. Despite this, national newspaper Daily Mirror mentioned Yoshida in their article of Premier League pace-setters. On 6 November 2016, he made his return to the starting line-up against Hull City and won a penalty, leading Charlie Austin to successfully convert, leading Southampton losing 2–1. Amid to the league, Yoshida started all six matches in the UEFA Europa League. He helped the Saints keep two clean sheets in the first two UEFA Europa League matches. After a famous 2–1 win against Inter Milan on 3 November 2016, as the club's forms declined and were eliminated from the tournament. On 7 January 2017, Yoshida scored his first goal of the season, in a 2–2 draw against Norwich City in the third round of the EFL Cup. Following the match, he dedicated his goal to his newly born baby daughter. Yoshida captained Southampton for the first time and helped the club beat Norwich City 1–0 in the third round of the FA Cup replay. Despite indifferent form on the part of both Yoshida and the Saints as a whole, Southampton became the first team in history to reach the final without conceding a single goal after beating Liverpool 2–0 on aggregate in the EFL semi–finals. Yoshida previously helped Southampton keep three clean sheets in a built up to the EFL Cup semi–finals. However, he started in the final, as Southampton loss 3–2 to Manchester United on 26 February 2017. Following Fonte's departure from the club, Yoshida regained his first team place for the rest of the season. On 5 April 2017, he scored his second goal of the season, in a 3–1 win against Crystal Palace. After the match, Manager Claude Puel praised Yoshida's performance, saying he was "fantastic" and mentioned that he could be "a captain" for Southampton. In a follow–up, Yoshida captained the Saints once again, in a 1–0 win against West Bromwich Albion. He then made his 100th appearance for Southampton and Premier League overall, becoming the first Japanese player to reach the milestone, in a 0–0 draw against Hull City on 29 April 2017. At the end of the 2016–17 season, which saw the club finish in seventh place, Yoshida went on to make thirty–seven appearances and scoring two times in all competitions.

In the 2017–18 season, Yoshida appeared in the first three league matches of the season, including winning a penalty and it was successfully converted by Austin, in a 3–2 win against West Ham United on 19 August 2017. It was announced on 24 August 2017 that Yoshida signed a further extension of his contract with Southampton until 2020. He continued to remain in competitions among the centre–backs, which saw him placed on the substitute bench. On 30 September 2017, Yoshida scored his first goal of the season, scoring from a volley in the 75th minute in a 2–1 loss against Stoke City. By the end of 2017, he captained six out of the eight matches for the Saints. Yoshida also scored his second goal of the season, in a 4–1 loss against Leicester City on 13 December 2017. However, Yoshida suffered a hamstring injury that kept him out for two weeks. On 27 January 2018, he made return from injury, coming on as a 67th-minute substitute, in a 1–0 win against Watford. Yoshida's return was short–lived when he suffered a knee injury that kept him out for two months. On 8 April 2018, Yoshida returned to the starting line-up and played for 72 minutes before being substituted, in a 3–2 loss against Arsenal. Throughout the 2017–18 season, the club have found themselves in a relegation zone, putting their Premier League status under threat. However, in the penultimate match of the season, a 1–1 draw with Everton on 5 May 2018, he was sent–off for a second bookable offence, so was suspended for the visit to Swansea City from which Southampton needed a win to survive at their hosts' expense. The match was won by Southampton, so Swansea City were relegated. At the end of the 2017–18 season, Yoshida went on to make twenty–eight appearances and scoring two times in all competitions.

Ahead of the 2018–19 season, Yoshida was linked a move away from Southampton, with Saudi Arabian side Al Hilal interested. But the transfer speculation came to an end after Yoshida announced his intention to stay at the club. At the start of the season, he found his first team opportunities limited under the management of Mark Hughes. On 27 August 2018, Yoshida made his first appearance of the season, starting the match, in a 1–0 win against Brighton & Hove Albion in the second round of the EFL Cup. He soon had a first team run, starting a lot of matches by the end of 2018. Following his international commitment with Japan at the AFC Asian Cup came to an end, Yoshida returned to the starting line-up and helped the Saints keep a clean sheet, in a 2–0 win against Fulham on 27 February 2019. Since returning to the first team, he regained his place for the rest of the season and helped Southampton avoid relegation once again. Despite being out with an illness that eventually saw him out for the rest of the 2018–19 season, Yoshida went on to make twenty appearances in all competitions.

In the 2019–20 season, Yoshida made his first appearance of the season, starting the match, in a 2–1 loss against Liverpool on 17 August 2019. He soon had a first team run ins for the next two months. Following a 9–0 loss to Leicester City in October, Yoshida was dropped to the bench and only played two further times for the team. On 30 June 2020, he confirmed his departure from the club after eight years.

=== Sampdoria ===
On 31 January 2020, Yoshida joined Serie A side Sampdoria on loan until the end of the season. Local newspaper the Southern Daily Echo described Yoshida's departure as the "end of an era".

Having appeared on the substitute bench for two matches, Yoshida made his Sampdoria debut against Hellas Verona on 8 March 2020 and played the whole game, as the club won 2–1. Following his debut for Sampdoria, he quickly became a fan favourite among the club's supporters. However, this turns out to be his only appearance for Sampdoria, as the season was suspended because of the COVID-19 pandemic. He remained an integral part of the club once the season resumed behind closed doors. In a match against Udinese on 12 July 2020, Yoshida set up a goal for former Southampton teammate Manolo Gabbiadini to help Sampdoria secure a 3–1 win. By the end of the 2019–20 season, Yoshida made fourteen appearances in all competitions.

After two months of negotiations over a permanent move, Yoshida returned to Sampdoria, signing a one–year contract with the club and took a pay cut upon doing so. His first game after signing for Sampdoria on a permanent basis came in the opening game of the season against Juventus, coming on as a second half substititute, in a 3–0 loss. Since joining the club, he found himself facing competitions in the centre–back positions with Omar Colley and Lorenzo Tonelli. Despite this, Yoshida continued to remain in the starting line–up, forming a centre–back partnership with either Colley or Tonelli. Halfway through the 2020–21 season, Yoshida played in the right–back position three times between 23 December 2020 and 6 January 2021, due to the absence of Bartosz Bereszyński. Following the return of Bereszyński, he returned to playing in the centre–back position for the rest of the 2020–21 season. On 19 January 2021, Yoshida signed a two–year contract with the club, keeping him until 2022. He scored his first goal for the Blucerchiati on 24 January 2021 against Parma. Despite suffering injury setbacks on two occasions throughout the 2020–21 season, Yoshida made thirty–four appearances and scoring once in all competitions.

At the start of the 2021–22 season, Yoshida continued to retain his first team place, forming a forming a centre–back partnership with Colley. He scored his first goal of the season, scoring a first half equaliser, as Sampdoria eventually drew 2–2 against Inter Milan on 12 September 2021. Two weeks later on 26 September 2021, Yoshida scored his second goal of the season, in a 3–2 loss against Juventus. However, he suffered a knee injury that saw him out for one match. But Yoshida made his return from injury, coming on as a 35th-minute substitute, in a 3–1 win against Hellas Verona on 27 November 2021. In a match against Cagliari Calcio on 6 January 2022, he set up the opening goal for Gabbiadini but suffered a thigh injury that resulted in his substitution, as the club loss 2–1. After the match, Yoshida was out for a month with a thigh injury. On 28 February 2022, he returned from injury, coming on as a second half substitute, in a 4–0 against Atalanta. Following his return from injury, Yoshida struggled to regain his place in the first team, with Colley and Alex Ferrari preferred for the rest of the 2021–22 season, During a 2–0 loss against Bologna on 11 April 2022, he was at fault, leading the opposition team to score the second goal of the game. At the end of the 2021–22 season, Yoshida made twenty–six appearances and scoring two times in all competitions. On 13 June 2022, he hinted of his departure from Sampdoria in the Japan's press conference over uncertainties of his future at the club. His departure from Sampdoria was confirmed on 30 June 2022.

=== Schalke 04 ===
On 5 July 2022, Yoshida joined German side Schalke 04 on a free transfer, signing a one-year contract with the Bundesliga club, with an option for another year. In the process, he became the third Japanese defender to ever play for Schalke, following Atsuto Uchida and Ko Itakura. The transfer was first reported via Twitter by Fabrizio Romano a few hours before the official announcement, with the Italian sports journalist adding that Yoshida had previously turned down several other offers, including one from Trabzonspor: the centre-back himself eventually expressed his surprise towards the accuracy of Romano's report in a quote retweet, writing, "This guy is incredible… even my wife didn't know about Trabzonspor". Upon joining the club, he was given a number twenty–two shirt, the shirt worn by Uchida, and consulted about the move with him, who asked him to choose the number.

Yoshida made his Schalke 04 debut as captain against Bremer SV in the first round of the DFB–Pokal and helped the club keep a clean sheet, in a 0–0 draw. Since joining Schalke 04, he became the club's first choice centre–back, forming a partnership with Henning Matriciani and later Moritz Jenz. However due to Schalke 04's poor performance, Yoshida's own performance came under criticism for his lack of speed in defence. Despite this, his poor performance has no effect on his Samurai Blue for the World Cup in Qatar. After the World Cup in Qatar, he led the club as captain to go on an unbeaten run of eight matches, which saw Schalke 04 improve on their results. Yoshida helped the club keep four clean sheets between 29 January 2023 and 19 February 2023. This proved an improvement performance for him, as he was threatened of facing demotion to the substitution bench. Towards the end of the 2022–23 season, Yoshida played two times for Schalke 04, as he was absent five times out of the seven remaining matches, due to injuries and competitions.

Yoshida featured in 29 league games for Schalke 04, as the Gelsenkirchen-based team finished second-to-bottom of the table and got relegated to the 2. Bundesliga. He left the club at the end of the season, following the expiration of his contract.

=== LA Galaxy ===
On 3 August 2023, Yoshida joined Major League Soccer club LA Galaxy on a free transfer, signing a contract through the end of the 2024 season.

He made his debut for the club, starting the match and kept a clean sheet, in a 1–0 win against Chicago Fire on 26 August 2023. Since joining LA Galaxy, Yoshida became a first team regular, forming a centre–back partnership with Eriq Zavaleta and Chris Mavinga. He scored his first goal for the club, scoring a second half equaliser, in a 4–2 loss against rivals, Los Angeles FC on 16 September 2023. In the absence of original captain Javier Hernández, Yoshida captained LA Galaxy for the first time and led the club to a 3–3 draw against Portland Timbers on 30 September 2023. Having started all the remaining LA Galaxy's matches since joining the club, he made twelve appearances and scoring once in all competitions.

Ahead of the 2024 season, it was announced that Yoshida was named as LA Galaxy's new captain following the departure of Hernández. He scored his first goal of the season, scoring a last minute equalier to help the club earn a 3–3 draw against St. Louis City SC on 17 March 2024. A month later on 22 April 2024, Yoshida scored his second goal of the season, in a 4–3 win against San Jose Earthquakes. Yoshida was crowned MLS champion after defeating the New York Red Bulls in MLS Cup 2024.

== International career ==
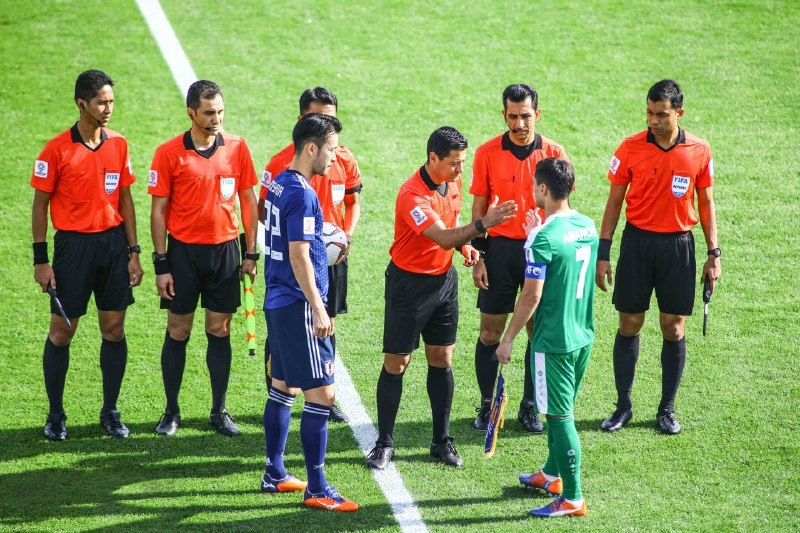
Yoshida and Turkmenistan's Arslanmyrat Amanow at the 2019 AFC Asian Cup

=== Youth/Olympics career ===
Yoshida was first called up to Japan's U-23 team in April 2008 for the first time following good performance at Nagoya Grampus. A month later on 22 May 2008, he made his Japan U23 debut in the Toulon Tournament and started the whole game, in a 2–1 win against France. Yoshida went on to make two appearances in the tournament, as Japan U-23 finished fourth place after reaching the semi–finals.

It was announced on 14 July 2008 that Yoshida was called up to the Japan U-23 team for the 2008 Summer Olympic in Beijing. After appearing twice as an unused substitute, he made his debut in the tournament, starting the match, in a 1–0 loss against Netherlands on 13 August 2008 and the Samurai Blue was eliminated from the tournament.

Four years later, Yoshida was called up to the Japan U-23 team for the second time ahead of the 2012 Summer Olympics in London. Ahead of the tournament, he was named as captain by Manager Takashi Sekizuka. Yoshida's first match as captain came on 26 July 2012 against Spain and helped the Samurai Blue keep a clean sheet, in a 1–0 win. In the next two matches, he helped the Japan U-23 team keep two more clean sheets against Morocco U23 and Honduras U23 with a win and draw respectively, resulting in Japan U23 qualifying for the knockout stage. Yoshida scored his first goal of the tournament, scoring a header from Hiroshi Kiyotake's free kick, in a 3–0 against Egypt U23 in the quarter–finals. However, he continued to lead Japan U23 finished fourth place in the Olympics after losing to Mexico U23 and South Korea U23. After the match, Yoshida said: "I can appreciate that the team whose initial expectation was not so high has advanced to the top four for the first time in 44 years. I do not think why I could not go on it or got a medal The Olympics are a gathering of young athletes called the U-23, and it is important that as many athletes go into the national team as A and stand on the World Cup stage."

In June 2021, Yoshida was named in the squad for his third Olympic tournament, this time on home soil, as one of three available over-age players. It was also announced that he would be the captain for the tournament. Prior to the start of the Olympics, Yoshida was featured in three out of the four friendly matches for the Samurai Blue. During which, he said about the Olympics event without spectators, saying: "I'm sorry for the non-audience. A lot of customers came to see us today, and the supporters' cheers helped us during the last 5 minutes and 10 minutes. It's a difficult situation. Now it's a difficult situation no matter which one you comment on." Yoshida soon clarified his statement, saying it was his "personal idea". He helped Japan win all three matches in the group stage to advance to the knockout stage. In the quarter–final against New Zealand, Yoshida captained the whole game throughout 120 minutes with a goalless result and successfully converted the winning kick in the penalty shootout, as the Samurai Blue won 4–2 to reach the semi–finals. However, Japan lost the next two matches in the semi–finals and bronze medal match against Spain and Mexico respectively. Despite failing to win a medal as he hoped for, Yoshida reflected about being captain for Japan in the Olympics, saying: "I had a lot of fun. I thought I could give everyone something, but young players could absorb a lot of things. I think I was able to grow as a player. Let's be proud and go home. I want to be proud and go home. This is not the end. Still, my soccer life will continue."

=== Senior career ===
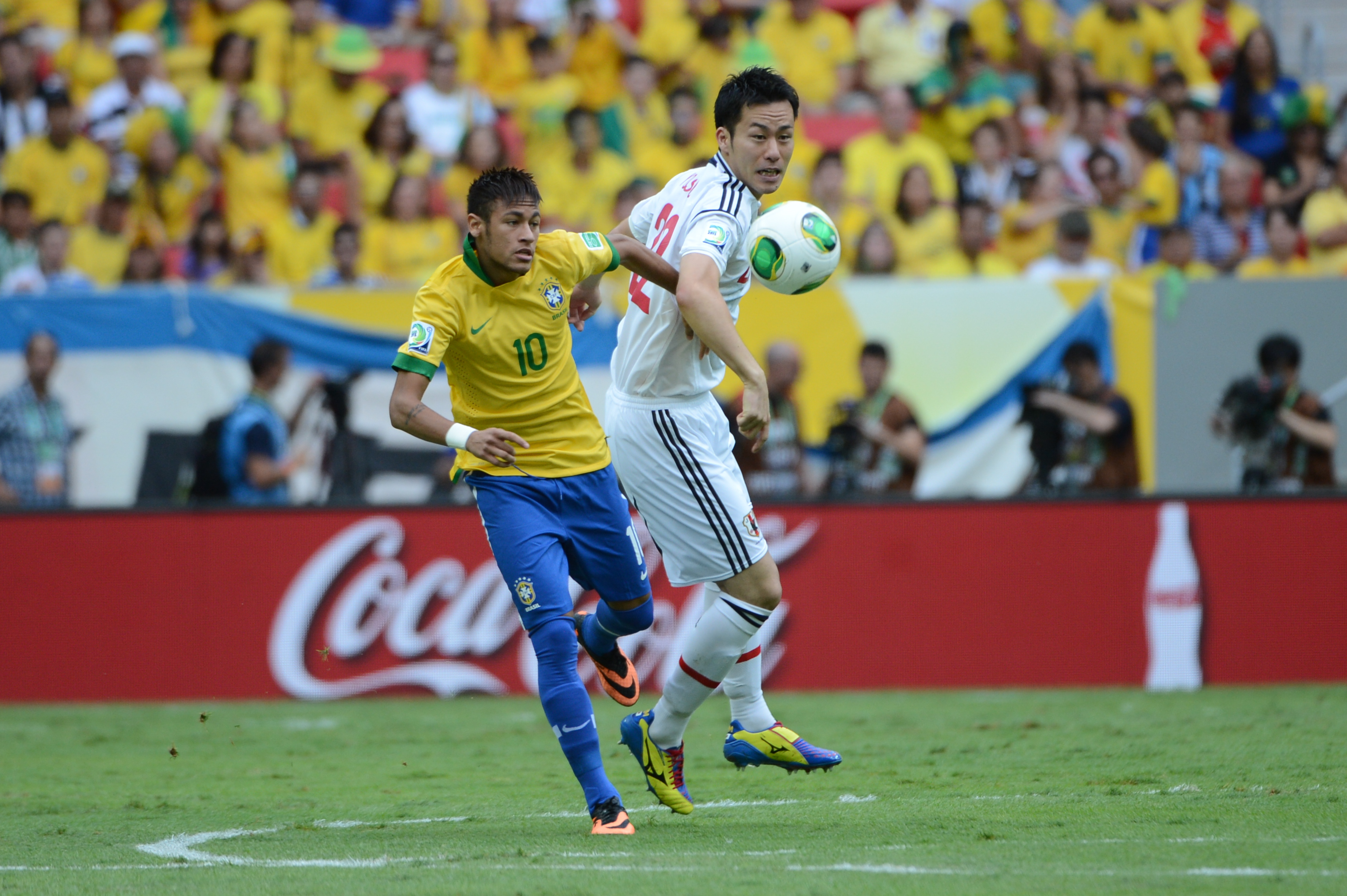
Yoshida and Neymar clashing for a ball during an opening match of the 2013 Confederations Cup between Brazil and Japan

In December 2009, Yoshida was called up to the senior national team for the first time. He made his full international debut for Japan on 6 January 2010 in a 2011 AFC Asian Cup qualifier against Yemen. Yoshida later reflected on his debut, saying: "Of course Yemen war of 2010 (3-2) because it was all the way to the target, I was happy." After fracturing his fingers, Yoshida stated that he was determined to recovery from his injury and hope to get called up for the 2010 World Cup squad. However, Yoshida did not make the cut.

In December 2010, Yoshida was called up to the Japan's squad for the 2011 AFC Asian Cup in Qatar. Under the management of Alberto Zaccheroni, it's emerged that he is expecting to start in the centre–back position ahead of the tournament. Yoshida scored his first Japan goal, in a 1–1 draw against Jordan on 9 January 2011. Yoshida started two more matches in the group-stage, as Japan progressed through the knockout stage. However, Yoshida was sent–off for a second bookable offence, in a 3–2 win against Qatar in the quarter–finals of the AFC Asian Cup. After serving a one match suspension, Yoshida returned to the starting line-ups in the AFC Asian Cup Final against Australia and played 120 minutes, as they beat the Socceroos 1–0 to win the AFC Asian Cup, thanks to Tadanari Lee. Between 7 June 2011 and 2 September 2011, Yoshida kept three consecutive three cleans; including once against North Korea, which he scored the only goal of the game. Yoshida kept an additional three more clean sheets between 7 October 2011 and 11 November 2011.

Following the Olympics, Yoshida continued to help Japan by keeping three consecutive clean sheets between 6 September 2012 and 12 October 2012 against UAE, Iraq and France. He later helped Japan qualify for the World Cup after drawing 1–1 against Australia on 4 June 2013. Two days later, Yoshida was called up to the Samurai Blue for the 2013 Confederations Cup squad. He was featured three times in the tournament, as Japan loss all three matches and was eliminated in the group stage.

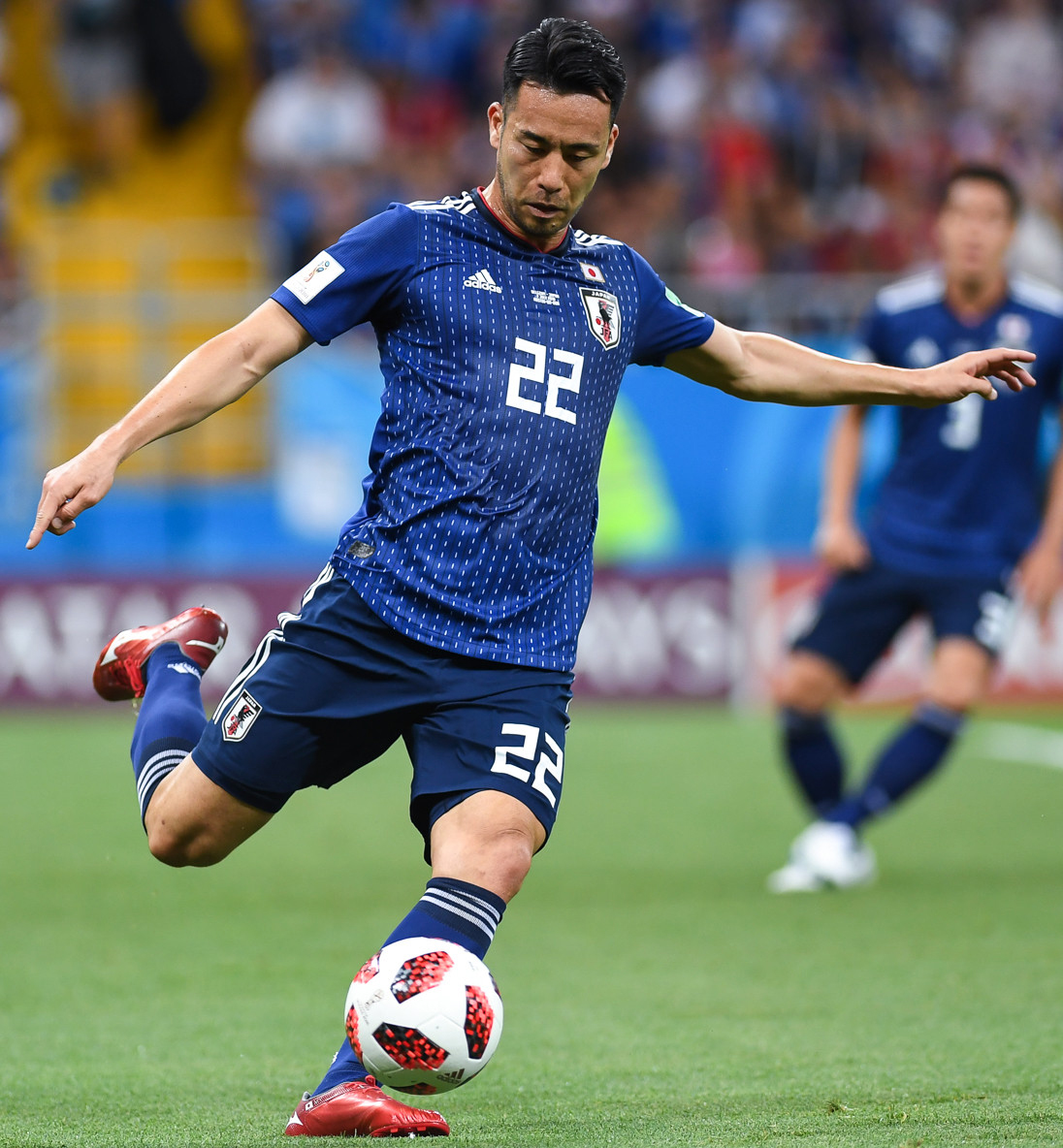
Yoshida playing for Japan during a match against Belgium in the round of 16 of the FIFA World Cup

In May 2014, Yoshida was named in Japan's preliminary squad for the 2014 World Cup in Brazil. In the end, he made it to the final cut for the 23-man squad. Yoshida started all three matches despite facing competitions from the centre–back and subsequently, Japan was eliminated from the tournament in the group stage, without winning any matches. Despite this, he kept a clean sheet in a 0–0 draw against Greece on 20 June 2014. Later in 2014, Yoshida scored his first Japan's goal in three years, as the Samurai Blue beat Honduras 6–0 on 14 November 2014.

In December 2014, Yoshida was selected as a member of the Japanese team for the 2015 AFC Asian Cup in Australia. He played Japan's opener match against debutant Palestine and scored the final goal in a 4–0 win. Yoshida helped Japan keep two more clean sheets to advance through to the quarter–finals. However, he conceded a goal from Ali Mabkhout before Japan equalised and the match was played throughout 120 minutes; ultimately, they were eliminated after losing in penalty–shootout. After the match, Yoshida acknowledged his fault for conceding a goal from the opposition team.

Throughout Japan's matches in the World Cup qualifying round, Yoshida then scored again in a 3–0 win against Cambodia on 3 September 2015. He later helped Japan keep two more clean sheets for Samurai Blue against Afghanistan and Syria. Yoshida kept four more clean sheets for Japan in the World Cup qualifying round between 12 November 2015 and 29 March 2016. During the run, he scored two goals against Singapore and Afghanistan. Three months later on 3 June 2016, Yoshida scored a brace, scoring in the fourth and five goal, in a 7–2 win against Bulgaria to help the Samurai Blue reach the final of the Kirin Cup Soccer. However, Japan loss 2–1 in the Kirin Cup Soccer final against Bosnia and Herzegovina on 7 June 2016. The following March, he captained Samurai Blue for the first time in his career and helped the Japan beat UAE 2–0. After the match, Yoshida said: "I have played several times in my team, but it is a big thing to be the captain of the national team. I felt it." In a follow–up match against Thailand, he scored again, in a 4–0 win. Three months later, on 31 August 2017, Yoshida started the match and beat Australia 2–0, earning Japan a place in the World Cup in Russia.

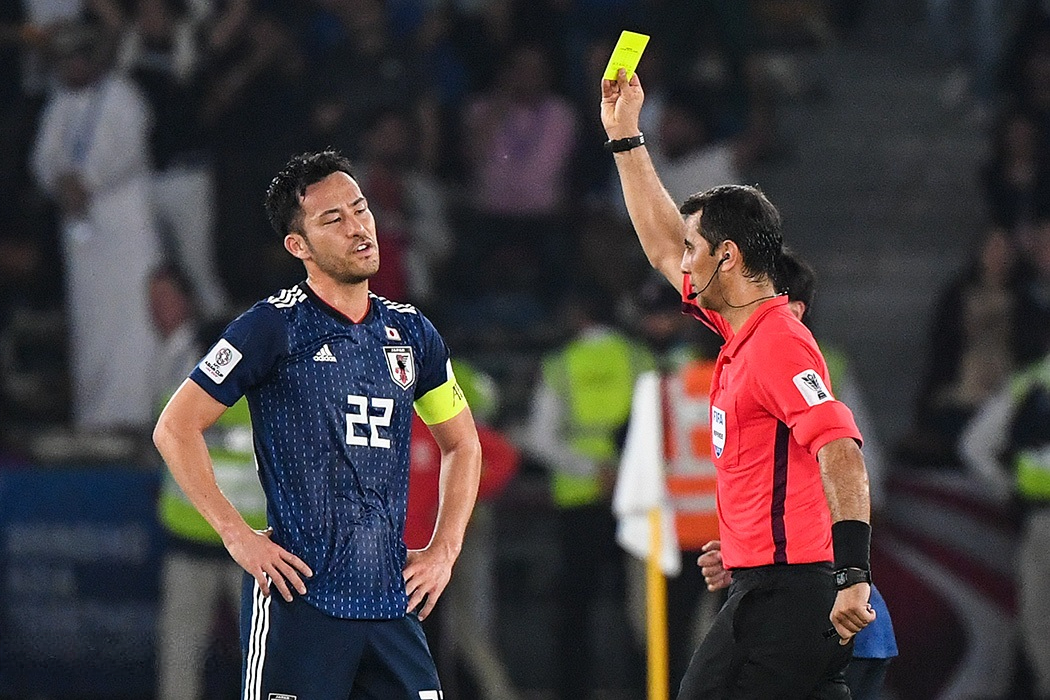
Yoshida booked for handball during a match against Qatar in the AFC Asian Cup final; leading to a penalty converted successfully from the opposition team and resulting Japan losing 3–1

On 31 May 2018, Yoshida was selected in the 23-man squad for the 2018 FIFA World Cup in Russia. It was expected once again that Yoshida will be starting in the centre–back position ahead of the tournament. He played every single minute in all the group stage matches against Colombia, Senegal and Poland. However, Japan was knocked out of the tournament after losing 3–2 to Belgium in the round of 16 match. His performance in the World Cup earned praises from the British media, such as, The Guardian and BBC Sport.

In December 2018, Yoshida was one of 23 Japanese players selected for the 2019 AFC Asian Cup. Ahead of the tournament, he was given the captaincy once again. Yoshida started the tournament as captain well when he helped Japan win 3–2 against Turkmenistan. Yoshida led the Samurai Blue all the way to the final, as well as, keeping four clean sheets along the way. In the AFC Asian Cup final against Qatar, he started and captained Japan, as the Samurai Blue loss 3–1, finishing as runner–up in the tournament. During the match, he was penalised for handball, leading Qatar to successfully convert the penalty to give the opposition team a 3–1 lead. After the match, Yoshida said: "I felt that the team had a good performance in the (semi-final) match against Iran, and they felt that they were going to be able to go this way and be able to go this way. I couldn't control, and I didn't win. I feel unhappy." However, Yoshida's call-up to the tournament caused squad selection problems for new Southampton manager Ralph Hasenhüttl during his absence. In response, he acknowledged the risk he took by playing for Japan in the Asian Cup.

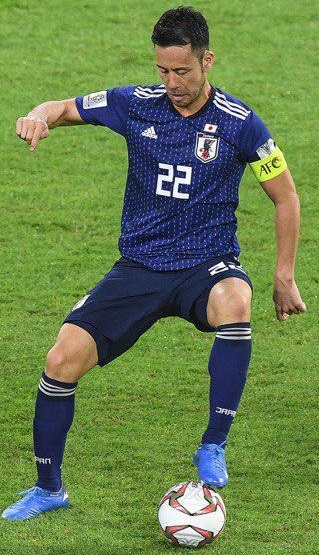
Yoshida playing for Japan during a match against Vietnam in 2019 AFC Asian Cup

Following the conclusion of the AFC Asian Cup, Yoshida didn't receive an international call–up until August. He was also given the captaincy. Yoshida captained the remaining matches of 2019 with clean sheets. During this run, he scored his first international goal of the year, in a 6–0 win against Mongolia on 10 October 2019. On 14 November 2019, Yoshida also played his 100th match for Japan against Kyrgyzstan. Almost a year later, in October 2020, he was called up to the Samurai Blue squad. He started four matches as captain by the end of the year and helped Japan keep three consecutive clean sheets before losing to Mexico on 17 November 2020. At the beginning of 2021, Yoshida continued to retain his captaincy and helped the Samurai Blue kept another three consecutive clean sheets against South Korea, Mongolia and Myanmar in the FIFA World Cup qualification. After losing 1–0 against Saudi Arabia on 7 October 2021, he confronted the section of Saudi Arabia supporters, angrily accusing them of making fun of him while conducting a post-match interview. Despite this, Yoshida led Japan to qualify for the FIFA World Cup in Qatar after Samurai Blue beat Australia 2–0. In a follow–up match against Vietnam, he scored a second–half equaliser, in a 1–1 draw. Two months later, Yoshida was called up to the Japan's squad for the Kirin Cup Soccer. He played in both matches for the Samurai Blue in the tournament, as Japan finished as runners-up after losing 3–0 against Tunisia.

His performances at Schalke 04 led to uncertainties on whether Yoshida would be included in the Japan's World Cup squad in Qatar. But on 1 November 2022, he was included as part of the Samurai Blue's 26 man squad for the FIFA World Cup in Qatar. Yoshida, once again, was placed as captain ahead of the tournament and formed a centre–back partnership with Ko Itakura and Shogo Taniguchi. He played all three matches in the group and led Japan reach the group stage for the second time in a row. After the match against Spain, Yoshida reflected on the performance: "I have no words. I can't quit playing for the national team because of this. It was awesome." On 5 December 2022, Yoshida set up a goal for Daizen Maeda, who scored a goal at the 43rd minute to put Samurai Blue in front during the round of 16 game against Croatia, which eventually ended 1–1 with Japan crashing out after their defeat on penalties, which he was one of the three players unsuccessfully converted in the shootout.

After Japan's elimination in the World Cup, Yoshida hinted at retiring from international football. Yoshida played his final game for the Samurai Blue on 31 May 2026, starting as captain in a 1–0 friendly win against Iceland. He received a guard of honour from both sets of players as he was substituted off in the 14th minute, handing the captain's armband to Wataru Endo.

== Personal life ==
Yoshida has two brothers: Mirei and Honami He later credited his older brother, Honami, for playing an important role in his football career. Before he was born, his name "Maya" was originally planned for a girl when his mother was pregnant. But the name was kept even if it was a boy who was born. Yoshida revealed on his blog on 26 September 2012 that he was married. Four years later, Yoshida revealed he was a first time father when his wife gave birth to a baby daughter. During his time at Southampton, Yoshida resided in Winchester. After spending seven years at Southampton, Yoshida revealed in an interview with SunSport that he had become a permanent resident in the United Kingdom and feels 25 per cent English.

His family runs a boarding house in Nagasaki for children who cannot go to high school. Growing up, Yoshida revealed that he is a fan of the anime and manga series Dragon Ball Z, and had an entire collection of Dragon Ball Z memorabilia until his father donated them to charity. Yoshida reflected on this, saying it helped him to think generously and give back to society. In November 2007, Yoshida affiliated himself with FIFA Players' Agent Tetsuro Kiyooka, in hopes of moving to Europe. It worked when he joined VVV-Venlo, three years after becoming Kiyooka's client. Since moving to Europe, Yoshida created a personal blog, where he reflected about his experience living and playing in a different continent. On every anniversary of the Atomic bombings, Yoshida, who is from Nagasaki, spoke out about his thoughts of the event.

In May 2018, Yoshida published his first book titled Unbeatable Mind. In addition to his native Japanese, Yoshida speaks fluent English since he first studied the language in middle school, as well as having studied Italian and Spanish during his professional footballing career, which helped prior to his move to Sampdoria, because as of August 2020, Yoshida began to speak Italian fluently.

On 9 August 2013, it was announced that Yoshida would be on the front cover of the Japanese Edition of FIFA 14. During his national team career, Yoshida said he considered fellow compatriot Atsuto Uchida a rival, yet his best friend, and is also close friends with Eiji Kawashima. Yoshida's uncle, Tsuyoshi Shimoyanagi, is a former professional baseball player. He is also a part-owner of Soccer Samurai.

In August 2019, Yoshida revealed that he was pledging one percent of his salary to a pledge-based charitable movement, named Saints Foundation. Two months later, Yoshida was named ambassador for the Saints' Foundation along with then-teammate James Ward-Prowse.

In the wake of COVID-19 pandemic, Yoshida posted a message on his social media account, urging people to stay at home. While the season was suspended because of the COVID-19 pandemic, Yoshida said he exercised daily for three months in order to maintain his fitness. In May 2020, Yoshida used his own money to buy 10,000 masks from Japan and deliver them to hospitals in Genoa.

On 20 June 2022, Yoshida was named the president of Japan Professional Soccer Players Association, succeeding Hideto Takahashi. Under his leadership, he introduced the JPFA Award, which an inaugural award took place on 18 January 2023.

Yoshida is a practicing Roman Catholic. He was gifted a rosary at the Vatican while he was playing for U.C. Sampdoria and says that he often wears it while entering the stadium before matches.

== Career statistics ==
=== Club ===
As of match played 25 October 2026

Appearances and goals by club, season and competition
Club	Season	League			National cup (Note: Includes Emperor's Cup, KNVB Cup, FA Cup, Coppa Italia and DFB-Pokal)		League cup (Note: Includes J. League Cup and EFL Cup)		Continental (Note: Includes AFC Champions League, UEFA Europa League and CONCACAF Champions Cup)		Other (Note: Includes Eredivisie playoffs, Leagues Cup, MLS Cup playoffs and Campeones Cup)		Total	
Club	Season	Division	Apps	Goals	Apps	Goals	Apps	Goals	Apps	Goals	Apps	Goals	Apps	Goals
Nagoya Grampus	2007	J1 League	19	0	2	1	3	0	—		—		24	1
Nagoya Grampus	2008	J1 League	22	1	3	1	4	0	—		—		29	2
Nagoya Grampus	2009	J1 League	30	4	6	1	1	1	11	2	—		48	8
Nagoya Grampus	Total		71	5	11	3	8	1	11	2	—		101	11
VVV-Venlo	2009–10	Eredivisie	0	0	—		—		—		—		0	0
VVV-Venlo	2010–11	Eredivisie	20	0	0	0	—		—		4	0	24	0
VVV-Venlo	2011–12	Eredivisie	32	5	1	0	—		—		4	0	37	5
VVV-Venlo	2012–13	Eredivisie	2	0	—		—		—		—		2	0
VVV-Venlo	Total		54	5	1	0	—		—		8	0	63	5
Southampton	2012–13	Premier League	32	0	1	0	1	0	—		—		34	0
Southampton	2013–14	Premier League	8	1	3	0	3	1	—		—		14	2
Southampton	2014–15	Premier League	22	1	0	0	1	0	—		—		23	1
Southampton	2015–16	Premier League	20	1	1	0	2	1	4	0	—		27	2
Southampton	2016–17	Premier League	23	1	2	1	6	0	6	0	—		37	2
Southampton	2017–18	Premier League	24	2	3	0	1	0	—		—		28	2
Southampton	2018–19	Premier League	17	0	0	0	3	0	—		—		20	0
Southampton	2019–20	Premier League	8	0	1	0	2	0	—		—		11	0
Southampton	Total		154	6	11	1	19	2	10	0	—		194	9
Sampdoria (loan)	2019–20	Serie A	14	0	0	0	—		—		—		14	0
Sampdoria	2020–21	Serie A	32	1	2	0	—		—		—		34	1
Sampdoria	2021–22	Serie A	26	2	0	0	—		—		—		26	2
Sampdoria	Sampdoria total		72	3	2	0	—		—		—		74	3
Schalke 04	2022–23	Bundesliga	29	0	2	0	—		—		—		31	0
LA Galaxy	2023	Major League Soccer	12	1	—		—		—		—		12	1
LA Galaxy	2024	Major League Soccer	34	2	—		—		—		7	0	41	2
LA Galaxy	2025	Major League Soccer	28	2	—		—		3	0	5	1	36	3
LA Galaxy	2026	Major League Soccer	23	2	—		—		5	0	—		28	2
LA Galaxy	Total		97	7	—		—		8	0	12	1	117	8
Career total			477	26	27	4	27	3	29	2	20	1	580	36

=== International ===
Appearances and goals by national team and year
National team	Year	Apps	Goals
Japan	2010	1	0
Japan	2011	12	2
Japan	2012	9	0
Japan	2013	15	0
Japan	2014	11	1
Japan	2015	13	3
Japan	2016	10	3
Japan	2017	9	1
Japan	2018	9	0
Japan	2019	11	1
Japan	2020	4	0
Japan	2021	9	0
Japan	2022	13	1
Japan	2026	1	0
Total		127	12

Scores and results list Japan's goal tally first, score column indicates score after each Yoshida goal.

List of international goals scored by Maya Yoshida
No.	Date	Venue	Cap	Opponent	Score	Result	Competition
1	9 January 2011	Suheim Bin Hamad Stadium, Doha, Qatar	2	Jordan	1–1	1–1	2011 AFC Asian Cup
2	2 September 2011	Saitama Stadium 2002, Saitama, Japan	9	North Korea	1–0	1–0	2014 FIFA World Cup qualification
3	14 November 2014	Toyota Stadium, Toyota, Japan	47	Honduras	1–0	6–0	Friendly
4	12 January 2015	Newcastle Stadium, Newcastle, Australia	49	Palestine	4–0	4–0	2015 AFC Asian Cup
5	3 September 2015	Saitama Stadium 2002, Saitama, Japan	56	Cambodia	2–0	3–0	2018 FIFA World Cup qualification
6	12 November 2015	National Stadium, Kallang, Singapore	60	Singapore	3–0	3–0	2018 FIFA World Cup qualification
7	24 March 2016	Saitama Stadium 2002, Saitama, Japan	62	Afghanistan	3–0	5–0	2018 FIFA World Cup qualification
8	3 June 2016	Toyota Stadium, Toyota, Japan	64	Bulgaria	4–0	7–2	2016 Kirin Cup
9	3 June 2016	Toyota Stadium, Toyota, Japan	64	Bulgaria	5–0	7–2	2016 Kirin Cup
10	28 March 2017	Saitama Stadium 2002, Saitama, Japan	73	Thailand	4–0	4–0	2018 FIFA World Cup qualification
11	10 October 2019	Saitama Stadium 2002, Saitama, Japan	98	Mongolia	2–0	6–0	2022 FIFA World Cup qualification
12	29 March 2022	Saitama Stadium 2002, Saitama, Japan	115	Vietnam	1–1	1–1	2022 FIFA World Cup qualification

== Honours ==
Southampton

- EFL Cup runner-up: 2016–17

LA Galaxy

- MLS Cup: 2024
- Western Conference (MLS): 2024

Japan

- AFC Asian Cup: 2011; runner-up: 2019

Individual

- AFC Asian Cup Team of the Tournament: 2019
- IFFHS Asian Men's Team of the Year: 2020, 2022
- IFFHS Asian Men's Team of the Decade: 2020

== See also ==
- List of men's footballers with 100 or more international caps
