= De Santana =

Surname

de Santana may refer to:

- Gabriel Donizete de Santana (born 1987), Brazilian midfielder
- Hernando de Santana, Spanish conqueror
- Reginaldo de Santana (born 1975), Brazilian football player

== See also ==
- Santana (disambiguation)
