= Anderson (footballer, born 1981) =

Brazilian footballer

Personal information
- Full name: Andrade Santos Silva
- Date of birth: 14 December 1981 (age 44)
- Place of birth: Tapiramutá, Brazil
- Height: 1.82 m (6 ft 0 in)
- Position: Defender

Senior career*
Years	Team	Apps	(Gls)
2001	Rio Branco AC		
2002–2003	Juventude	2	(0)
2004	Portuguesa		
2005–2006	Lech Poznań	23	(1)
2006–2007	Pogoń Szczecin	8	(0)
2007	Yokohama FC	0	(0)
2008	Santa Cruz		
2008–2009	Arka Gdynia	10	(1)
2009–2011	Santa Helena		
2011–2012	Esportivo		
2012	Atlético de Alagoinhas		
2013	Galícia		
2014	Catuense		
2014–2020	CE Flamengo		
2020–2021	Rio Branco		
- * Club domestic league appearances and goals

Andrade Santos Silva (born 14 December 1981), known as just Anderson, is a Brazilian former professional footballer who played as a defender.

== Club career ==
Anderson previously played for Juventude and Santa Cruz in the Campeonato Brasileiro Série A and Copa do Brasil.
