= 2007 J.League Division 1 =

15th season of J1 League

J.League Division 1
- Season: 2007
- Champions: Kashima Antlers; 5th J.League title 5th Japanese title
- Relegated: Sanfrecce Hiroshima; Ventforet Kofu; Yokohama FC
- Champions League: Kashima Antlers; Urawa Red Diamonds; Gamba Osaka (all to the group stage)
- Matches: 306
- Goals: 867 (2.83 per match)
- Top goalscorer: Juninho (22 goals)
- Highest attendance: 62,132 (Round 33, Reds vs. Antlers)
- Lowest attendance: 4,114 (Round 30, Yokohama vs. Ardija)
- Average attendance: 19,066

The 2007 J.League Division 1 season was the 15th season since the establishment of the J.League Division 1. The season began on March 3 and ended on December 1.

== General ==
=== Promotion and relegation ===
- At the end of the 2006 season, Yokohama FC, Kashiwa Reysol, and Vissel Kobe were promoted to J1.
- At the end of the 2006 season, Avispa Fukuoka, Cerezo Osaka, and Kyoto Purple Sanga were relegated to J2.

=== Changes in competition formats ===
- In the past, J.League Champion qualified to A3 Champions Cup, but since 2007 this berth is given to the Nabisco Cup winner.

== Honours ==
Competition	Champion	Runners-up	3rd place
J.League Division 1	Kashima Antlers	Urawa Red Diamonds	Gamba Osaka
J.League Division 2	Consadole Sapporo	Tokyo Verdy 1969	Kyoto Purple Sanga
Emperor's Cup	Kashima Antlers	Sanfrecce Hiroshima	Kawasaki Frontale; Gamba Osaka
Nabisco Cup	Gamba Osaka	Kawasaki Frontale	Kashima Antlers; Yokohama F. Marinos
XEROX Super Cup	Gamba Osaka	Urawa Red Diamonds	—N/a

== Clubs ==
Location of the clubs in Japan

The following eighteen clubs participated in J.League Division 1 during 2007 season. Of these clubs, Yokohama FC, Kashiwa Reysol, and Vissel Kobe were newly promoted clubs.

- Albirex Niigata
- FC Tokyo
- Gamba Osaka
- JEF United Chiba
- Júbilo Iwata
- Kashima Antlers
- Kashiwa Reysol
- Kawasaki Frontale
- Nagoya Grampus Eight
- Oita Trinita
- Omiya Ardija
- Sanfrecce Hiroshima
- Shimizu S-Pulse
- Urawa Red Diamonds
- Ventforet Kofu
- Vissel Kobe
- Yokohama FC
- Yokohama F. Marinos

=== Personnel ===
Club	Head coach	Kit manufacturer	Shirt sponsor
Albirex Niigata	(Japan) Jun Suzuki	Adidas	Kameda Seika
FC Tokyo	(Japan) Hiromi Hara	Adidas	Eneos
Gamba Osaka	(Japan) Akira Nishino	Umbro	Panasonic
JEF United Chiba	(Bosnia and Herzegovina) Amar Osim	Kappa	Fuji Electric
Júbilo Iwata	(Japan) Atsushi Uchiyama	Puma	Iida Sangyo
Kashima Antlers	(Brazil) Oswaldo de Oliveira	Nike	Tostem
Kashiwa Reysol	(Japan) Nobuhiro Ishizaki	Umbro	Hitachi
Kawasaki Frontale	(Japan) Takashi Sekizuka	Asics	Fujitsu
Nagoya Grampus Eight	(Netherlands) Sef Vergoossen	Le Coq Sportif	Toyota
Oita Trinita	(Brazil) Péricles Chamusca	Puma	None
Omiya Ardija	(Japan) Satoru Sakuma	Lotto	NTT Docomo
Sanfrecce Hiroshima	(Serbia) Mihailo Petrović	Mizuno	Deodeo
Shimizu S-Pulse	(Japan) Kenta Hasegawa	Puma	Suzuyo
Urawa Red Diamonds	(Germany) Holger Osieck	Nike	SAVAS
Ventforet Kofu	(Japan) Takeshi Oki	Umbro	Nipro
Vissel Kobe	(Japan) Hiroshi Matsuda	Asics	Rakuten
Yokohama FC	(Brazil) Júlio César Leal	Hummel	Nisso Group
Yokohama F. Marinos	(Japan) Hiroshi Hayano	Adidas	Nissan

=== Foreign players ===
Club	Player 1	Player 2	Player 3	Non-visa foreign	Type-C contract	Former players
Albirex Niigata	(Brazil) Edmílson	(Brazil) Márcio Richardes	(Brazil) Silvinho			
FC Tokyo	(Brazil) Evaldo	(Brazil) Lucas Severino			(Brazil) Rychely	(Costa Rica) Paulo Wanchope
Gamba Osaka	(Brazil) Baré	(Brazil) Magno Alves	(Brazil) Sidiclei			
JEF United Chiba	(Brazil) Reinaldo	(Serbia) Nenad Đorđević		(South Korea) Kim Dong-soo	(South Korea) Park Jong-jin	(Bulgaria) Ilian Stoyanov
Júbilo Iwata	(Brazil) Fabrício	(Brazil) Henrique	(Brazil) Marquinhos Paraná			
Kashima Antlers	(Brazil) Danilo	(Brazil) Fabão	(Brazil) Marquinhos			
Kashiwa Reysol	(Brazil) Alceu	(Brazil) França	(Brazil) Márcio Araújo		(Brazil) Bruno Roque (Ivory Coast) Seydou Doumbia	
Kawasaki Frontale	(Brazil) Francismar	(Brazil) Juninho	(Brazil) Magnum	(North Korea) Jong Tae-se		
Nagoya Grampus Eight	(Norway) Frode Johnsen	(Slovakia) Marek Špilár	(South Korea) Kim Jung-woo			
Oita Trinita	(Brazil) Edmilson Alves	(Brazil) Luís Augusto	(Brazil) Roberto		(Brazil) Platini	(Brazil) Júnior Maranhão (Brazil) Serginho Baiano
Omiya Ardija	(Brazil) Dênis Marques	(Brazil) Leandro Euzébio			(Brazil) Pedro Júnior	(Brazil) Alison (Brazil) Enílton (Brazil) Mauricio Salles
Sanfrecce Hiroshima	(Brazil) Ueslei	(Bulgaria) Ilian Stoyanov	(Croatia) Dario Dabac	(North Korea) Ri Han-jae	(South Korea) Jo Woo-jin	
Shimizu S-Pulse	(Brazil) Alexandre Goulart	(Brazil) Fernandinho	(South Korea) Cho Jae-jin		(South Korea) Kim Dong-sub	(Brazil) Anderson Andrade
Urawa Red Diamonds	(Brazil) Nenê	(Brazil) Robson Ponte	(Brazil) Washington	(Spain) Sergio Escudero		
Ventforet Kofu	(Brazil) Alberto	(Montenegro) Dženan Radončić				(Brazil) Josimar
Vissel Kobe	(Brazil) Emerson Thome	(Brazil) Leandro	(Brazil) Raphael Botti	(South Korea) Park Kang-jo	(South Korea) Kim Tae-yeon	(Brazil) Gabriel
Yokohama FC	(Brazil) Adriano Pimenta	(Brazil) Marcos Paulo	(South Korea) Oh Beom-seok	(South Korea) Chong Yong-de	(Brazil) Katatau (South Korea) Bae Seung-jin (South Korea) Cho Young-cheol	(Brazil) Anderson (Brazil) Gilmar
Yokohama F. Marinos	(Brazil) Marques				(Brazil) Eltinho	(Brazil) Marcus Vinícius

== Format ==
Eighteen clubs will play in double round-robin (home and away) format, a total of 34 games each. A club receives 3 points for a win, 1 point for a tie, and 0 points for a loss. The clubs are ranked by points, and tie breakers are, in the following order:

- Goal differential
- Goals scored
- Head-to-head results

A draw would be conducted, if necessary. However, if two clubs are tied at the first place, both clubs will be declared as the champions. The bottom two clubs will be relegated to J2, while the 16th placed club plays a two-legged promotion/relegation series.

== Table ==
Pos	Team	Pld	W	D	L	GF	GA	GD	Pts	Qualification or relegation
1	Kashima Antlers (C)	34	22	6	6	60	36	+24	72	2008 AFC Champions League Group Stage
2	Urawa Red Diamonds	34	20	10	4	55	28	+27	70	2008 AFC Champions League Knockout Stage
3	Gamba Osaka	34	19	10	5	71	37	+34	67	2008 AFC Champions League Group Stage (Note: Urawa Red Diamonds won the 2006 Emperor's Cup and have already qualified for AFC Champions League. Since Urawa takes the extra spot as the defending 2007 ACL champion; therefore Gamba Osaka received the third ACL spot as the third place team of the league.) (Note: Gamba Osaka qualifies to Pan-Pacific Championship as the Nabisco Cup winner.)
4	Shimizu S-Pulse	34	18	7	9	53	36	+17	61	
5	Kawasaki Frontale	34	14	12	8	66	48	+18	54	
6	Albirex Niigata	34	15	6	13	48	47	+1	51	
7	Yokohama F. Marinos	34	14	8	12	54	35	+19	50	
8	Kashiwa Reysol	34	14	8	12	43	36	+7	50	
9	Júbilo Iwata	34	15	4	15	54	55	−1	49	
10	Vissel Kobe	34	13	8	13	58	48	+10	47	
11	Nagoya Grampus Eight	34	13	6	15	43	45	−2	45	
12	FC Tokyo	34	14	3	17	49	58	−9	45	
13	JEF United Chiba	34	12	6	16	51	56	−5	42	
14	Oita Trinita	34	12	5	17	42	60	−18	41	
15	Omiya Ardija	34	8	11	15	24	40	−16	35	
16	Sanfrecce Hiroshima (R)	34	8	8	18	44	71	−27	32	2007 promotion/relegation Series
17	Ventforet Kofu (R)	34	7	6	21	33	65	−32	27	Relegation to 2008 J.League Division 2
18	Yokohama FC (R)	34	4	4	26	19	66	−47	16	Relegation to 2008 J.League Division 2

Updated to match(es) played on December 1, 2007. Source: J. League Division 1
Rules for classification: 1) points; 2) goal difference; 3) number of goals scored.
(C) Champions; (R) Relegated

== Results ==
Home \ Away	ALB	ANT	ARD	FRO	GAM	GRA	JEF	JÚB	REY	SFR	SSP	TOK	TRI	RED	VEN	VIS	YFC	FMA
Albirex Niigata		1–1	1–0	2–0	2–1	4–0	0–1	1–1	1–2	2–1	0–2	2–1	0–2	2–2	3–1	3–1	3–1	0–6
Kashima Antlers	3–1		0–0	4–1	0–1	2–1	3–1	2–1	1–0	5–1	3–0	1–2	3–0	0–1	2–0	3–2	2–1	1–1
Omiya Ardija	2–1	1–2		1–1	0–3	1–0	0–1	0–2	1–1	1–0	1–2	0–2	1–2	1–1	1–2	1–3	1–0	0–0
Kawasaki Frontale	4–3	1–0	1–1		4–1	1–1	1–1	2–3	0–0	3–0	2–1	5–2	2–2	1–1	1–1	2–1	6–0	1–2
Gamba Osaka	3–1	5–1	1–0	2–2		3–1	2–0	5–2	2–1	3–0	1–1	6–2	1–0	0–1	5–0	1–1	2–1	0–2
Nagoya Grampus Eight	2–0	3–0	5–0	2–2	1–4		2–0	0–0	2–0	2–3	1–2	0–1	1–2	1–2	1–1	2–0	0–0	0–3
JEF United Chiba	1–2	3–3	1–0	1–3	1–2	0–2		3–2	1–1	1–3	1–3	3–2	6–0	2–4	3–2	4–2	4–0	2–3
Júbilo Iwata	2–4	1–3	0–0	1–3	1–1	1–0	1–0		4–0	4–2	0–1	5–2	2–1	0–2	2–1	2–3	3–0	1–0
Kashiwa Reysol	0–0	0–1	0–0	4–0	1–2	2–0	1–0	4–0		2–0	1–3	2–0	2–0	0–2	2–1	1–3	1–1	1–0
Sanfrecce Hiroshima	0–0	0–1	2–1	1–1	2–2	1–3	2–2	0–1	1–1		2–1	0–5	2–0	2–4	2–2	1–1	0–2	1–3
Shimizu S-Pulse	3–1	1–2	2–2	3–1	3–1	3–0	2–2	2–1	0–1	3–1		1–3	2–0	0–1	2–0	1–0	1–0	1–1
FC Tokyo	1–3	1–2	1–2	0–7	1–1	0–1	4–1	0–1	0–1	2–4	2–0		1–2	0–2	2–1	3–1	1–0	2–1
Oita Trinita	1–1	2–2	3–1	2–0	0–4	1–3	0–1	1–0	2–1	1–2	3–4	0–0		2–2	4–1	2–0	2–0	0–3
Urawa Red Diamonds	1–0	0–1	0–1	1–2	1–1	0–0	1–1	2–1	1–1	4–1	0–0	3–2	2–1		2–0	2–0	2–1	1–1
Ventforet Kofu	0–1	0–1	0–0	1–3	1–2	0–2	0–1	1–6	3–2	2–1	0–0	0–1	2–0	1–4		4–3	1–0	1–1
Vissel Kobe	0–1	1–1	0–0	1–1	2–2	5–0	2–1	4–0	2–1	3–2	1–0	0–0	1–3	1–2	4–1		3–0	0–0
Yokohama FC	0–2	0–1	0–1	0–1	1–1	1–2	0–1	1–2	2–4	1–2	1–1	0–2	2–1	1–0	0–2	0–3		1–0
Yokohama F. Marinos	1–0	2–3	0–2	2–1	0–0	0–2	1–0	4–1	0–2	2–2	0–2	0–1	5–0	0–1	1–0	1–4	8–1	

Updated to match(es) played on December 1, 2007. Source: J. League Division 1
Legend: Blue = home team win; Yellow = draw; Red = away team win.

== Top scorers ==
Rank	Scorer	Club	Goals
1	(Brazil) Juninho	Kawasaki Frontale	22
2	(Brazil) Baré	Gamba Osaka	20
3	(Brazil) Edmílson	Albirex Niigata	19
4	(Brazil) Ueslei	Sanfrecce Hiroshima	17
5	(Brazil) Washington	Urawa Red Diamonds	16
6	(Brazil) Leandro	Vissel Kobe	15
7	(Brazil) Marquinhos	Kashima Antlers	14
7	(Japan) Hideo Ōshima	Yokohama F. Marinos	14
7	(Japan) Yoshito Ōkubo	Vissel Kobe	14
10	(Norway) Frode Johnsen	Nagoya Grampus Eight	13
10	(South Korea) Cho Jae-jin	Shimizu S-Pulse	13

== Attendance ==
Pos	Team	Total	High	Low	Average	Change
1	Urawa Red Diamonds	793,347	62,123	16,709	46,667	+2.4%
2	Albirex Niigata	650,698	42,015	31,500	38,276	−1.1%
3	FC Tokyo	429,934	38,439	17,264	25,290	+5.0%
4	Yokohama F. Marinos	408,656	53,916	10,828	24,039	+1.6%
5	Oita Trinita	335,896	27,811	14,671	19,759	−2.9%
6	Gamba Osaka	296,465	20,982	12,163	17,439	+7.3%
7	Kawasaki Frontale	294,751	23,355	13,185	17,338	+20.9%
8	Júbilo Iwata	278,109	35,072	9,292	16,359	−9.1%
9	Kashima Antlers	276,058	36,146	8,036	16,239	+5.2%
10	Shimizu S-Pulse	271,180	20,318	11,460	15,952	+11.5%
11	Nagoya Grampus Eight	264,939	34,347	7,553	15,585	+4.4%
12	JEF United Chiba	240,535	16,756	9,481	14,149	+5.6%
13	Yokohama FC	238,662	46,697	4,114	14,039	+174.3%^{†}
14	Ventforet Kofu	233,476	36,756	8,373	13,734	+12.5%
15	Kashiwa Reysol	220,442	35,013	8,947	12,967	+55.7%^{†}
16	Vissel Kobe	211,822	22,236	7,769	12,460	+80.3%^{†}
17	Omiya Ardija	194,912	33,162	6,149	11,465	+12.0%
18	Sanfrecce Hiroshima	194,199	22,675	6,037	11,423	+2.2%
	League total	5,834,081	62,123	4,114	19,066	+4.2%

Updated to games played on December 1, 2007
Source: J. League Division 1
Notes:
^{†} Team played previous season in J2.

== Awards ==
=== Individual ===
Award	Recipient	Club
Player of the Year	(Brazil) Robson Ponte	Urawa Red Diamonds
Young Player of the Year	(Japan) Takanori Sugeno	Yokohama FC
Manager of the Year	(Brazil) Oswaldo de Oliveira	Kashima Antlers
Top Scorer	(Brazil) Juninho	Kawasaki Frontale
Fair Play Player Award	(Japan) Daisuke Sakata	Yokohama F. Marinos
Fair Play Player Award	(Japan) Hisato Satō	Sanfrecce Hiroshima
Fair Play Player Award	(Japan) Teruyoshi Ito	Shimizu S-Pulse
Referee of the Year	(Japan) Masayoshi Okada	
Assistant Referee of the Year	(Japan) Toru Sagara	
Meritoriousness Player Award	(Brazil) Amaral	
Meritoriousness Player Award	(Japan) Shoji Jo	
Meritoriousness Player Award	(Japan) Yasuto Honda	

=== Best Eleven ===
Position	Footballer	Club	Nationality
GK	Ryōta Tsuzuki (1)	Urawa Red Diamonds	Japan
DF	Daiki Iwamasa (1)	Kashima Antlers	Japan
DF	Marcus Tulio Tanaka (4)	Urawa Red Diamonds	Japan
DF	Satoshi Yamaguchi (1)	Gamba Osaka	Japan
MF	Robson Ponte (1)	Urawa Red Diamonds	Brazil
MF	Keita Suzuki (2)	Urawa Red Diamonds	Japan
MF	Kengo Nakamura (2)	Kawasaki Frontale	Japan
MF	Yasuhito Endō (5)	Gamba Osaka	Japan
MF	Yuki Abe (3)	Urawa Red Diamonds	Japan
FW	Baré (1)	Gamba Osaka	Brazil
FW	Juninho (1)	Kawasaki Frontale	Brazil

* The number in brackets denotes the number of times that the footballer has appeared in the Best 11.
