= Tapiramutá =

Coordinates: 11°51′S 40°47′W

- Municipality
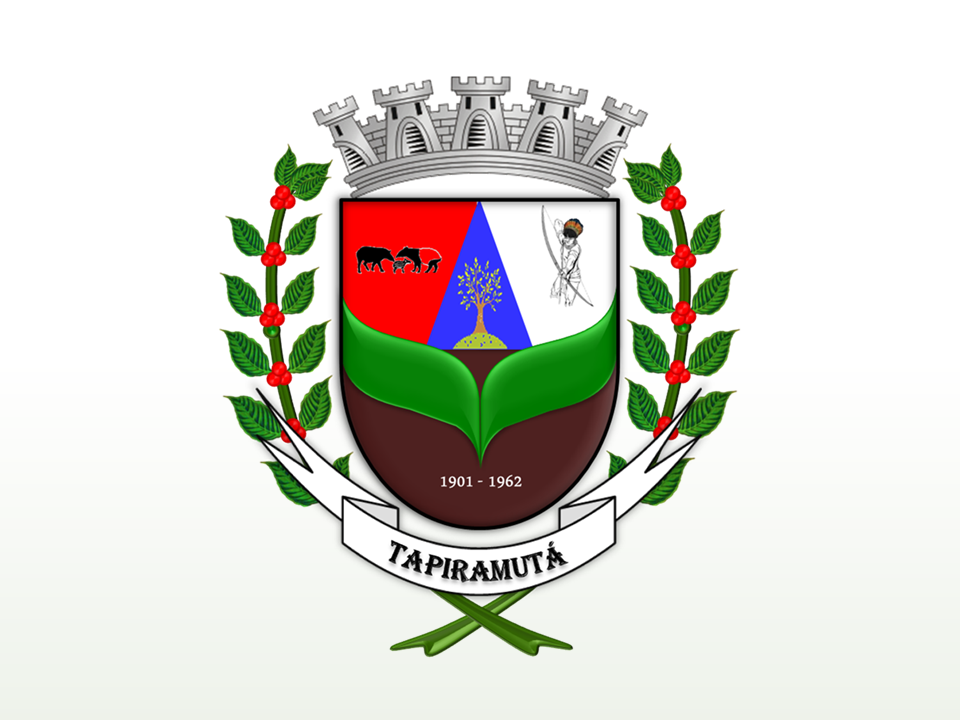
- Flag Coat of arms
- Interactive map of Tapiramutá
- Country: Brazil
- Region: Nordeste
- State: Bahia

Population (2020)
  - Total: 16,974
- Time zone: UTC−3 (BRT)

Tapiramutá is a municipality in the state of Bahia in the North-East region of Brazil.

== See also ==
- List of municipalities in Bahia
