= Alceu (footballer) =

Brazilian footballer (born 1984)

Personal information
- Full name: Alceu Rodrigues Simoni Filho
- Date of birth: May 7, 1984 (age 42)
- Place of birth: Diadema, Brazil
- Height: 1.77 m (5 ft 10 in)
- Position: Defensive midfielder

Team information
- Current team: Marília

Senior career*
Years	Team	Apps	(Gls)
2002–2006	Palmeiras	71	(1)
2007	Kashiwa Reysol	28	(1)
2008	Consadole Sapporo	0	(0)
2008	Náutico		
2008	São Carlos		
2009–2010	Kashiwa Reysol	6	(0)
2011	Grêmio Prudente	1	(0)
2012–2014	Marília		
2015–2017	Montedio Yamagata	69	(3)
2018–	Marília		
- * Club domestic league appearances and goals as of 14 January 2018

Alceu Rodrigues Simoni Filho, or simply Alceu (born May 7, 1984), is a Brazilian former defensive midfielder who last played for Marília Atlético Clube.

== Career ==
Alceu previously played for Palmeiras and Náutico in the Campeonato Brasileiro Série A and had twice played for Kashiwa Reysol.

== Club statistics ==
Updated to 23 February 2016.

Club performance			League		Cup		League Cup		Total	
Season	Club	League	Apps	Goals	Apps	Goals	Apps	Goals	Apps	Goals
Brazil			League		Copa do Brasil		League Cup		Total	
2002	Palmeiras	Série A	1	0					1	0
2003	Palmeiras	Série B								
2004	Palmeiras	Série A	24	0					24	0
2005	Palmeiras	Série A	19	0					19	0
2006	Palmeiras	Série A	24	1					24	1
Japan			League		Emperor's Cup		J. League Cup		Total	
2007	Kashiwa Reysol	J1 League	28	1	1	1	2	1	31	3
2008	Consadole Sapporo	J1 League	0	0	0	0	0	0	0	0
Brazil			League		Copa do Brasil		League Cup		Total	
2008	Náutico Capibaribe	Série A								
2008	São Carlos									
Japan			League		Emperor's Cup		J. League Cup		Total	
2009	Kashiwa Reysol	J1 League	0	0	–		0	0	0	0
2010	Kashiwa Reysol	J2 League	6	0	0	0	–		6	0
2015	Montedio Yamagata	J1 League	32	2	3	1	3	1	38	4
Country	Brazil		68	1					68	1
Country	Japan		28	1	1	1	2	1	31	3
Total			96	2	1	1	2	1	99	4
