= Tetsuro Kiyooka =

Japanese sports agent (born 1970)

- 清岡 哲朗
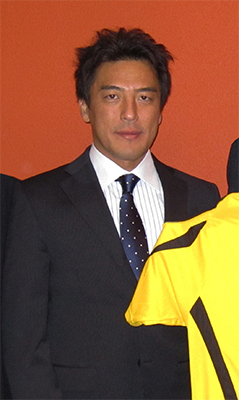
- Kiyooka at the 2010 Maya Yoshida VVV-Venlo press conference in the Netherlands.
- Born: 30 July 1970 (age 56); Kanagawa, Japan
- Occupations: Entrepreneur; businessman; Sports Agent

Tetsuro Kiyooka (Japanese: 清岡 哲朗, Kiyooka Tetsuro, 30 July 1970) is a Japanese entrepreneur and former FIFA Players' Agent (Sports agent). Kiyooka is the founder and CEO of SpecTip. He holds Permanent residency in Canada. His ancestors are the Shizoku in Tosa Province, Japan, and he is a distant relative of Roy Kiyooka.

== SpecTip ==
In 2016, Kiyooka established SpecTip in Vancouver, Canada, and began the process of developing an online video platform with no advertisements. He was inspired to create an interactive online platform where users, including content creators and viewers, could share their creative content and express their appreciation. His statement reads, “SpecTip was born at the crosslines of technology and integrity. I don't believe in advertisements and price tags on the internet. So, I created this business model in which users have the freedom to pay tips spontaneously when and if they choose”.

== Tip Rewards Patent ==
Kiyooka applied for multiple patents to the WIPO with the PCT international application in 2018, 2019 and 2020 of the new business model for an online video platform. The patents were granted in 2019, 2020 and 2021, and USPTO and JPO have granted multiple patents since then. The patent is called “Tip Reward Patent,” which defines Rewards that motivate users to tip and encourage them to pay it permanently, and Rewards on the internet (also known as a bonus) as something that money cannot buy.

== Sports agent ==
In 2006, he passed the FIFA Players' Agent exam and registered with The Football Association (England), the Royal Dutch Football Association (Netherlands) and the Japan Football Association as an official agent. After that, he represented top Japanese players such as Keisuke Honda, Maya Yoshida and led them to the football clubs in European leagues.

== Japan Pro-Footballers Association (JPFA) ==
In 2009, Kiyooka was designated as a chief operating officer of the Japan Pro-Footballers Association (JPFA, ja) by Toshiya Fujita, a chairman of the board. He repealed the unfair transfer regulations between the clubs of J.League and the professional players in 2009 and formed the organization as a trade union in 2011. Also, he represented the players of the Japan national football team to protect their rights and payments.

== Web development ==
In 2005, Kiyooka collaborated with NTT Communications to create a football site called Nippon World Soccer on mobile internet services (i-mode, EZweb) in Japan. The mobile football site acquired over one million users a month in 2006 and became the biggest football mobile site in Japan at that time.
