= Yasuki Hiramatsu =

Yasuki Hiramatsu (平松 保城, Hiramatsu Yasuki; (April 30, 1926 – April 11, 2012) was born in Osaka, Japan. He was a Japanese artist and considered a pioneer of modern jewelry in Japan. He served as a member of the Japan Craft Design Association, the Japan Jewellery Designers Association, and the Mitglied von der Gesellschaft für Goldschmiedekunst.

== Awards and prizes ==
- 1952–1957 Twice awarded prizes from the Living Industrial Arts Institute, Tokyo, Japan
- 1969 Gold Prize at 3rd Craft Center Japan
- 1970 Prize at the Japan New Craft Exhibition, Tokyo
- 1990 Created a present for Empress Kōjun to bestow on the Empress Michiko on her enthronement
- 1991 41st Craft Award in Excellence awarded by the Japanese Government Ministry of Education, Culture, Sports, Science and Technology
- 1994 First non-European to be awarded 'the Ring of Goldsmiths' from Gellschaft fur Goldschmiedekunst
- 1995 Awarded ìContribution to Design Promotion' by the Japanese Government Ministry of International Trade and Industry
- 1996 Awarded 'Bayerischer Staatspreis' by the Bayern Government Ministry, Germany
- 1997 Awarded 'Kunii Kitaro Prize' by Japan Industrial Art Foundation.

== Solo exhibition ==
- 1978 Galerie am Graben, Wien, Austria
- 1990 Electrum Gallery, London
- 1993 Professor Yasuki Hiramatsu Retirement Exhibition, Tokyo University of the Arts
- 1994 STUDIO TON BERENDS, Den Haag, Netherlands
- 1995 LUISE SMIT, Amsterdam, Netherlands
- 1996 Galerij Sofie Lachaert, Gent, Belgium
- 1997 Magari, Barcelona, Spain; Galerij Sofie Lachaert, Antwerpen, Belgium
- 2006 Gallery HANAIRO, Anraku-ji (temple), Kyoto
- 2008 Crafts Gallery, The National Museum of Modern Art, Tokyo
