= Gabriel (footballer, born 1987) =

Brazilian footballer

Personal information
- Full name: Gabriel Donizette de Santana
- Date of birth: September 8, 1987 (age 39)
- Place of birth: Brazil
- Height: 1.79 m (5 ft 10 in)
- Position: Midfielder

Youth career
- 2004: Oscar Sports
- 2005: Mogi Mirim
- 2006: Oscar Sports

Senior career*
Years	Team	Apps	(Gls)
2006–2008	Amparo-SP		
2006–2007	→Vissel Kobe (loan)	16	(2)
2008–2009	Aluminium	26	(7)
2009–	Sanat Naft		(1)
- * Club domestic league appearances and goals

Gabriel Donizette de Santana, or simply Gabriel (born September 8, 1987) is a Brazilianiel played for V in the J1 League during 2006 and 2007.

== Club statistics ==
Club performance			League		Cup		League Cup		Total	
Season	Club	League	Apps	Goals	Apps	Goals	Apps	Goals	Apps	Goals
Japan			League		Emperor's Cup		J.League Cup		Total	
2006	Vissel Kobe	J2 League	9	1	1	0	-		10	1
2007	Vissel Kobe	J1 League	7	1	1	0	3	1	11	2
Iran			League		Hazfi Cup		League Cup		Total	
2008–09	Aluminium Hormozgan	Azadegan League	26	7						
2009–10	Sanat Naft	Azadegan League		1						
Country	Japan		16	2	2	0	3	1	20	3
Country	Iran			8						
Total										
