= Yasuki Ishidate =

Japanese footballer

Personal information
- Full name: Yasuki Ishidate
- Date of birth: September 24, 1984 (age 42)
- Place of birth: Aichi, Japan
- Height: 1.77 m (5 ft 9 1/2 in)
- Position: Forward

Youth career
- 2003–2005: Hamamatsu University

Senior career*
Years	Team	Apps	(Gls)
2006–2007	Kashiwa Reysol	4	(0)
2008–2009	Tochigi SC	65	(8)
2010	Tochigi Uva FC	24	(7)
2011–2013	Zweigen Kanazawa	73	(16)
Total		166	(31)
- * Club domestic league appearances and goals

Yasuki Ishidate (石舘 靖樹, Ishidate Yasuki; born September 24, 1984) is a former Japanese football player.

== Club statistics ==
Club performance			League		Cup		League Cup		Total	
Season	Club	League	Apps	Goals	Apps	Goals	Apps	Goals	Apps	Goals
Japan			League		Emperor's Cup		League Cup		Total	
2006	Kashiwa Reysol	J2 League	4	0	2	0	-		6	0
2007	Kashiwa Reysol	J1 League	0	0	0	0	0	0	0	0
2008	Tochigi SC	Football League	24	6	0	0	-		24	6
2009	Tochigi SC	J2 League	41	2	0	0	-		41	2
2010	Tochigi Uva FC	Football League								
Total	Japan		69	8	3	0	0	0	72	8
Career total			69	8	3	0	0	0	72	8
