= Bruno Roque =

Brazilian footballer (born 1989)

Bruno
Personal information
- Full name: Bruno Roque de Sousa
- Date of birth: February 15, 1989 (age 37)
- Place of birth: Paraná, Brazil
- Height: 1.77 m (5 ft 10 in)
- Position: Defensive midfielder

Team information
- Current team: PSTC

Youth career
- 2005–2006: PSTC

Senior career*
Years	Team	Apps	(Gls)
2007	PSTC	?	(?)
2007	Kashiwa Reysol	0	(0)
2008–	PSTC		
- * Club domestic league appearances and goals

Bruno Roque de Sousa or simply Bruno (born February 15, 1989) is a Brazilian defensive midfielder. He currently plays for PSTC in Brazil.

== Playing career ==
Bruno Roque came through the youth team at Paraná Soccer Technical Center. He joined top team of Grêmio in 2007. In June, he moved to J1 League club, Kashiwa Reysol. End of 2007 season, he returned to Paraná Soccer Technical Center.
