= 2023 Supercoppa Italiana final =

Final of the 36th edition of Supercoppa Italiana

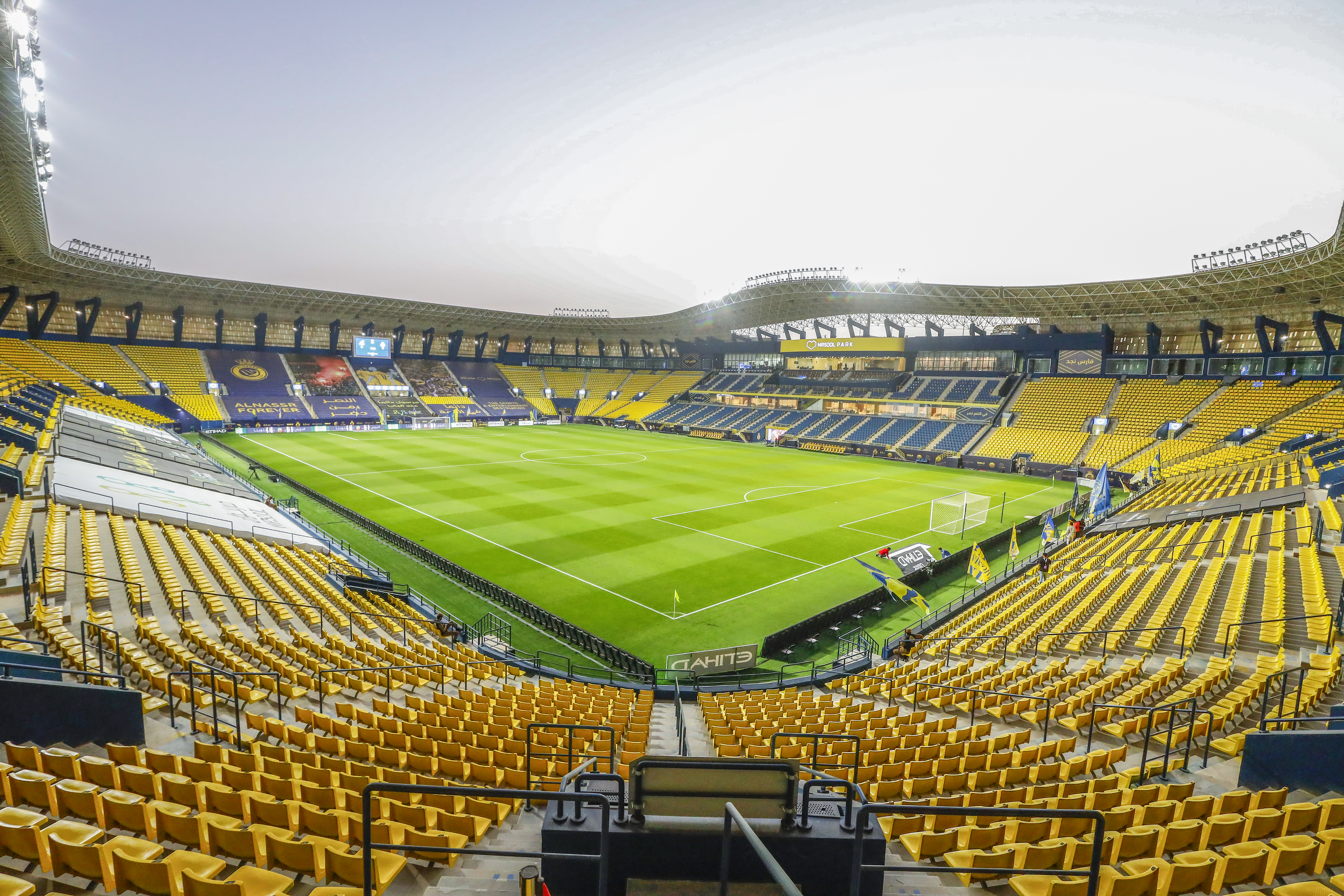
- The King Saud University Stadium in Riyadh hosted the final.
- Event: 2023 Supercoppa Italiana
Napoli	Inter Milan
0	1
- Date: 22 January 2024
- Venue: King Saud University Stadium, Riyadh
- Man of the Match: Lautaro Martínez (Inter Milan)
- Referee: Antonio Rapuano
- Attendance: 24,900

The 2023 Supercoppa Italiana final was a football match to decide the winners of the 2023 Supercoppa Italiana, the Italian football super cup. It was the 36th edition of the annual tournament, which was also the first edition to feature a final match in the new four-team format. The match was played on 22 January 2024 at the King Saud University Stadium in Riyadh, Saudi Arabia. The match was between the 2022–23 Serie A winners, Napoli, and the 2022–23 Coppa Italia winners, Inter Milan.

Inter Milan won the match 1–0 for their third consecutive and eighth overall Supercoppa Italiana title.

== Teams ==
Team	Qualification for tournament	Previous finals appearances (bold indicates winners)
Napoli	2022–23 Serie A champions	4 (**1990**, 2012, **2014**, 2020)
Inter Milan	2022–23 Coppa Italia winners	11 (**1989**, 2000, **2005**, **2006**, 2007, **2008**, 2009, **2010**, 2011, **2021**, **2022**)

== Route to the final ==
Napoli		Round	Inter Milan	
Opponent	Result	2023 Supercoppa Italiana	Opponent	Result
Fiorentina	3–0	Semi-finals	Lazio	3–0

== Match ==
=== Details ===
22 January 2024
22:00 AST

Napoli	0–1	Inter Milan
	Report	Martínez 90+1'

King Saud University Stadium, Riyadh
Attendance: 24,900
Referee: Antonio Rapuano

**Napoli**	**Inter Milan**

GK	95	(Italy) Pierluigi Gollini
CB	22	(Italy) Giovanni Di Lorenzo (c)
CB	13	(Kosovo) Amir Rrahmani	(yellow card) 42'
CB	5	(Brazil) Juan Jesus
RM	30	(Italy) Pasquale Mazzocchi		(substituted off) 74'
CM	68	(Slovakia) Stanislav Lobotka
CM	24	(Sweden) Jens Cajuste		(substituted off) 74'
LM	23	(Italy) Alessio Zerbin	(yellow card) 46'	(substituted off) 58'
RW	21	(Italy) Matteo Politano		(substituted off) 70'
CF	18	(Argentina) Giovanni Simeone	(yellow card) 55' (yellow-red card) 60'
LW	77	(Georgia (country)) Khvicha Kvaratskhelia		(substituted off) 70'
Substitutes:
GK	14	(Italy) Nikita Contini
GK	16	(Poland) Hubert Idasiak
DF	6	(Portugal) Mário Rui		(substituted on) 74'
DF	50	(Italy) Luigi D'Avino
DF	55	(Norway) Leo Skiri Østigård		(substituted on) 58'
MF	4	(Germany) Diego Demme
MF	20	(Poland) Piotr Zieliński
MF	29	(Denmark) Jesper Lindstrøm		(substituted on) 70'
MF	60	(Italy) Francesco Gioielli
FW	26	(Belgium) Cyril Ngonge
FW	70	(Italy) Gianluca Gaetano	(yellow card) 90'	(substituted on) 70'
FW	81	(Italy) Giacomo Raspadori		(substituted on) 74'
Manager:
(Italy) Walter Mazzarri			(yellow card) 76'

GK	1	(Switzerland) Yann Sommer
CB	28	(France) Benjamin Pavard
CB	15	(Italy) Francesco Acerbi
CB	6	(Netherlands) Stefan de Vrij	(yellow card) 48'	(substituted off) 62'
RM	36	(Italy) Matteo Darmian
CM	23	(Italy) Nicolò Barella	(yellow card) 55'	(substituted off) 63'
CM	20	(Turkey) Hakan Çalhanoğlu	(yellow card) 44'
CM	22	(Armenia) Henrikh Mkhitaryan
LM	32	(Italy) Federico Dimarco		(substituted off) 81'
CF	10	(Argentina) Lautaro Martínez (c)		(substituted off) 90+3'
CF	9	(France) Marcus Thuram		(substituted off) 81'
Substitutes:
GK	12	(Italy) Raffaele Di Gennaro
GK	77	(Italy) Emil Audero
DF	30	(Brazil) Carlos Augusto		(substituted on) 62'
DF	31	(Germany) Yann Aurel Bisseck		(substituted on) 90+3'
DF	44	(Italy) Giacomo Stabile
DF	50	(Serbia) Aleksandar Stanković
DF	95	(Italy) Alessandro Bastoni
MF	2	(Netherlands) Denzel Dumfries
MF	5	(Italy) Stefano Sensi
MF	14	(Netherlands) Davy Klaassen
MF	16	(Italy) Davide Frattesi		(substituted on) 63'
MF	17	(Canada) Tajon Buchanan
MF	21	(Albania) Kristjan Asllani
FW	8	(Austria) Marko Arnautović		(substituted on) 81'
FW	70	(Chile) Alexis Sánchez		(substituted on) 81'
Manager:
(Italy) Simone Inzaghi

Man of the Match:
Lautaro Martínez (Inter Milan)

Assistant referees:
Valerio Colarossi
Alessio Tolfo
Fourth official:
Marco Di Bello
Reserve assistant referee:
Luigi Rossi
Video assistant referee:
Aleandro Di Paolo
Assistant video assistant referee:
Gianluca Aureliano

**Match rules**

- 90 minutes.
- Penalty shoot-out if scores level.
- Maximum of fifteen named substitutes.
- Maximum of five substitutions. (Note: Each team was given only three opportunities to make substitutions, excluding substitutions made at half-time.)

== See also ==
- 2023–24 Serie A
- 2023–24 Coppa Italia
- 2023–24 Inter Milan season
- 2023–24 SSC Napoli season
