= 2023–24 SSC Napoli season =

SSC Napoli
2023–24 season
- President: Aurelio De Laurentiis
- Head coach: Rudi Garcia (until 14 November); Walter Mazzarri (from 14 November to 19 February); Francesco Calzona (from 19 February)
- Stadium: Stadio Diego Armando Maradona
- Serie A: 10th
- Coppa Italia: Round of 16
- Supercoppa Italiana: Runners-up
- UEFA Champions League: Round of 16
- Top goalscorer: League: Victor Osimhen (15); All: Victor Osimhen (17)
- Average home league attendance: 45,517
- Biggest win: 6–1 vs Sassuolo (away), 28 February 2024, Serie A
- Biggest defeat: 0–4 vs Frosinone (home), 19 December 2023, Coppa Italia
Home colours	Away colours	Third colours

The 2023–24 season was SSC Napoli's 98th season in existence and 17th consecutive season in the Serie A. In addition to the domestic league, the club also participated in the Coppa Italia, UEFA Champions League and Supercoppa Italiana, being eliminated in the last 16 of the former two competitions and finishing as runners-up in the latter one.

== Players ==
=== First-team squad ===
As of 1 February 2024

Note: Flags indicate national team as defined under FIFA eligibility rules; some limited exceptions apply. Players may hold more than one non-FIFA nationality.

No.	Pos.	Nation	Player
1	GK	ITA	Alex Meret
3	DF	BRA	Natan
4	MF	GER	Diego Demme
5	DF	BRA	Juan Jesus
6	DF	POR	Mário Rui (vice-captain)
8	MF	CIV	Hamed Traorè (on loan from Bournemouth)
9	FW	NGR	Victor Osimhen
13	DF	KOS	Amir Rrahmani (3rd captain)
14	GK	ITA	Nikita Contini
16	GK	POL	Hubert Idasiak
17	DF	URU	Mathías Olivera
18	FW	ARG	Giovanni Simeone
20	MF	POL	Piotr Zieliński
21	FW	ITA	Matteo Politano

No.	Pos.	Nation	Player
22	DF	ITA	Giovanni Di Lorenzo (captain)
24	MF	SWE	Jens Cajuste
26	FW	BEL	Cyril Ngonge
29	MF	DEN	Jesper Lindstrøm
30	DF	ITA	Pasquale Mazzocchi
32	MF	BEL	Leander Dendoncker (on loan from Aston Villa)
55	DF	NOR	Leo Skiri Østigård
68	MF	SVK	Stanislav Lobotka
77	FW	GEO	Khvicha Kvaratskhelia
81	FW	ITA	Giacomo Raspadori
95	GK	ITA	Pierluigi Gollini (on loan from Atalanta)
99	MF	CMR	André-Frank Zambo Anguissa

=== Out on loan ===
As of 1 February 2024

Note: Flags indicate national team as defined under FIFA eligibility rules; some limited exceptions apply. Players may hold more than one non-FIFA nationality.

No.	Pos.	Nation	Player
—	GK	ITA	Elia Caprile (at Empoli until 30 June 2024)
—	DF	ITA	Francesco Mezzoni (at Perugia until 30 June 2024)
—	DF	ITA	Nosa Edward Obaretin (at Trento until 30 June 2024)
—	DF	ITA	Alessandro Zanoli (at Salernitana until 30 June 2024)
—	MF	ITA	Michael Folorunsho (at Hellas Verona until 30 June 2024)
—	MF	ITA	Gianluca Gaetano (at Cagliari until 30 June 2024)
—	MF	ITA	Matteo Marchisano (at Potenza until 30 June 2024)
—	MF	MLI	Coli Saco (at Ancona until 30 June 2024)

No.	Pos.	Nation	Player
—	MF	ITA	Antonio Vergara (at Reggiana until 30 June 2025)
—	FW	ITA	Giuseppe Ambrosino (at Catanzaro until 30 June 2024)
—	FW	MAR	Walid Cheddira (at Frosinone until 30 June 2024)
—	FW	ITA	Antonio Cioffi (at Ancona until 30 June 2024)
—	FW	ITA	Giuseppe D'Agostino (at Picerno until 30 June 2024)
—	FW	ITA	Lorenzo Sgarbi (at Avellino until 30 June 2024)
—	FW	ITA	Alessio Zerbin (at Monza until 30 June 2024)

== Transfers ==
=== In ===
Pos.	Player	Transferred from	Fee	Date	Source
FW	(Italy) Giacomo Raspadori	(Italy) Sassuolo	€36,000,000	1 July 2023	
FW	(Argentina) Giovanni Simeone	(Italy) Hellas Verona	€12,000,000	1 July 2023	
GK	(Italy) Elia Caprile	(Italy) Bari	€7,000,000	24 July 2023	
DF	(Brazil) Natan	(Brazil) Red Bull Bragantino	€10,000,000	7 August 2023	
MF	(Sweden) Jens Cajuste	(France) Reims	€12,000,000	10 August 2023	
FW	(Morocco) Walid Cheddira	(Italy) Bari	Undisclosed	20 August 2023	
FW	(Denmark) Jesper Lindstrøm	(Germany) Eintracht Frankfurt	€25,000,000	29 August 2023	
DF	(Italy) Pasquale Mazzocchi	(Italy) Salernitana	€3,000,000	5 January 2024	
MF	(Ivory Coast) Hamed Traorè	(England) Bournemouth	Loan	17 January 2024	
FW	(Belgium) Cyril Ngonge	(Italy) Hellas Verona	€18,000,000	19 January 2024	
MF	(Belgium) Leander Dendoncker	(England) Aston Villa	Loan	26 January 2024	

=== Out ===
Pos.	Player	Transferred to	Fee	Date	Source
FW	(Italy) Andrea Petagna	(Italy) Monza	€10,000,000	1 July 2023	
DF	(Italy) Sebastiano Luperto	(Italy) Empoli	€2,500,000	1 July 2023	
DF	(South Korea) Kim Min-jae	(Germany) Bayern Munich	€50,000,000	18 July 2023	
GK	(Italy) Elia Caprile	(Italy) Empoli	Loan	24 July 2023	
FW	(Morocco) Walid Cheddira	(Italy) Frosinone	Loan	20 August 2023	
FW	(Mexico) Hirving Lozano	(Netherlands) PSV Eindhoven	€15,000,000	1 September 2023	
MF	(North Macedonia) Eljif Elmas	(Germany) RB Leipzig	€25,000,000	1 January 2024	
DF	(Italy) Alessandro Zanoli	(Italy) Salernitana	Loan	17 January 2024	
FW	(Italy) Alessio Zerbin	(Italy) Monza	Loan	25 January 2024	
MF	(Italy) Gianluca Gaetano	(Italy) Cagliari	Loan	1 February 2024	

== Pre-season and friendlies ==
Win Draw Loss Fixtures

20 July 2023 Friendly	Napoli (Italy)	6–1	(Italy) Anaune Val di Non	Dimaro
18:00 CEST (UTC+2)	Politano 22' (pen.); Vergara 25'; Cioffi 49'; Saco 57'; Iaccarino 69'; Olivera 90'	Report	Biscaro 51' (pen.)	Stadium: Campo Sportivo Dimaro; Referee: Andrea Terribile

24 July 2023 Friendly	Napoli (Italy)	1–1	(Italy) SPAL	Dimaro
18:00 CEST (UTC+2)	Zambo Anguissa 73'	Report	Puletto 63'	Stadium: Campo Sportivo Dimaro; Referee: Paride Tremolada

29 July 2023 Friendly	Napoli (Italy)	4–0	(Turkey) Hatayspor	Castel di Sangro
18:30 CEST (UTC+2)	Osimhen 23', 28'; Simeone 64', 70'	Report		Stadium: Stadio Teofilo Patini; Referee: Matteo Marchetti (Italy)

2 August 2023 Friendly	Napoli (Italy)	1–1 (3–1 p)	(Spain) Girona	Castel di Sangro
18:30 CEST (UTC+2)	Simeone 42' (pen.)	Report	Stuani 13'; A. García (yellow card) 31'; Martínez (yellow card) 72'	Stadium: Stadio Teofilo Patini; Referee: Giacomo Camplone (Italy)
	Penalties
	Raspadori (penalty scored); Zambo Anguissa (penalty scored); Zieliński (penalty scored); Politano (penalty missed)		(penalty missed) Víctor; (penalty missed) Callens; (penalty scored) Almena; (penalty missed) Couto

6 August 2023 Friendly	Napoli (Italy)	1–0	(Germany) FC Augsburg	Castel di Sangro
18:30 CEST (UTC+2)	Rrahmani 61'	Report		Stadium: Stadio Teofilo Patini; Attendance: 6,000; Referee: Ruben Alberto Arena (Italy)

11 August 2023 Friendly	Napoli (Italy)	2–0	(Cyprus) Apollon Limassol	Castel di Sangro
18:30 CEST (UTC+2)	Osimhen 60'; Simeone 70'	Report		Stadium: Stadio Teofilo Patini; Referee: Matteo Centi (Italy)

== Competitions ==
=== Overall record ===
Competition	First match	Last match	Starting round	Final position	Record							
Competition	First match	Last match	Starting round	Final position	Pld	W	D	L	GF	GA	GD	Win %
Serie A	19 August 2023	26 May 2024	Matchday 1	10th	38	13	14	11	55	48	+7	34.21
Coppa Italia	19 December 2023		Round of 16	Round of 16	1	0	0	1	0	4	−4	0.00
Supercoppa Italiana	18 January 2024	22 January 2024	Semi-finals	Runners-up	2	1	0	1	3	1	+2	50.00
UEFA Champions League	20 September 2023	12 March 2024	Group stage	Round of 16	8	3	2	3	12	13	−1	37.50
Total					49	17	16	16	70	66	+4	34.69

Source: Soccerway

=== Serie A ===
==== League table ====
Pos	Team	Pld	W	D	L	GF	GA	GD	Pts	Qualification or relegation
8	Fiorentina	38	17	9	12	61	46	+15	60	Qualification for the Conference League play-off round
9	Torino	38	13	14	11	36	36	0	53 (Note: Torino finished ahead of Napoli on head-to-head points: Torino 3–0 Napoli, Napoli 1–1 Torino.)	
10	Napoli	38	13	14	11	55	48	+7	53	
11	Genoa	38	12	13	13	45	45	0	49	
12	Monza	38	11	12	15	39	51	−12	45	

Source: Serie A
Rules for classification: 1) Points; 2) Tiebreaker for Champions team and third relegated team; 3) Head-to-head points; 4) Head-to-head goal difference; 5) Goal difference; 6) Goals scored; 7) Draw.
(Note: Head-to-head record is used only after all the matches between the teams in question have been played)

==== Results summary ====
Overall								Home						Away					
Pld	W	D	L	GF	GA	GD	Pts	W	D	L	GF	GA	GD	W	D	L	GF	GA	GD
38	13	14	11	55	48	+7	53	6	7	6	24	27	−3	7	7	5	31	21	+10

Source: Serie A

==== Results by round ====
Round	1	2	3	4	5	6	7	8	9	10	11	12	13	14	15	16	17	18	19	20	21	22	23	24	25	26	27	28	29	30	31	32	33	34	35	36	37	38
Ground	A	H	H	A	A	H	A	H	A	H	A	H	A	H	A	H	A	H	A	H	A	A	H	A	H	A	H	H	A	H	A	H	A	H	A	H	A	H
Result	W	W	L	D	D	W	W	L	W	D	W	L	W	L	L	W	L	D	L	W	W	D	W	L	D	D	W	D	D	L	W	D	L	D	D	L	D	D
Position	3	2	6	5	7	5	3	5	4	5	4	4	4	5	6	5	7	8	9	8	9	9	7	9	9	9	7	7	7	8	7	8	8	8	8	9	10	10

Source: Serie A
A = Away; H = Home; W = Win; D = Draw; L = Loss

==== Matches ====
The league fixtures were unveiled on 5 July 2023.

19 August 2023 1	Frosinone	1–3	Napoli	Frosinone
18:30 CEST (UTC+2)	Harroui 7' (pen.); Oyono (yellow card) 12'; Mazzitelli (yellow card) 45+5'; Gelli (yellow card) 83'	Report	Lobotka (yellow card) 13'; Politano 24'; Cajuste (yellow card) 27'; Olivera (yellow card) 39'; Osimhen 42', 79'	Stadium: Stadio Benito Stirpe; Attendance: 15,822; Referee: Matteo Marcenaro

27 August 2023 2	Napoli	2–0	Sassuolo	Naples
20:45 CEST (UTC+2)	Osimhen 16' (pen.); Raspadori (penalty missed) 60'; Di Lorenzo 64'	Report	Ruan (yellow card) 30'; Lopez (red card) 51'	Stadium: Stadio Diego Armando Maradona; Attendance: 46,925; Referee: Antonio Giua

2 September 2023 3	Napoli	1–2	Lazio	Naples
20:45 CEST (UTC+2)	Zieliński 32'	Report	Zaccagni (yellow card) 26'; Luis Alberto 30', (yellow card) 60'; Kamada 52'	Stadium: Stadio Diego Armando Maradona; Attendance: 42,765; Referee: Andrea Colombo

16 September 2023 4	Genoa	2–2	Napoli	Genoa
20:45 CEST (UTC+2)	De Winter (yellow card) 32'; Retegui (yellow card) 33', (goal) 56'; Bani 40'; Badelj (yellow card) 75'	Report	Elmas (yellow card) 1'; Raspadori 76'; Cajuste (yellow card) 78'; Politano 84'	Stadium: Stadio Luigi Ferraris; Attendance: 33,275; Referee: Michael Fabbri

24 September 2023 5	Bologna	0–0	Napoli	Bologna
18:00 CEST (UTC+2)	Aebischer (yellow card) 30'; Ndoye (yellow card) 55'; Skorupski (yellow card) 72'; Freuler (yellow card) 81'	Report	Olivera (yellow card) 6'; Lobotka (yellow card) 49'; Kvaratskhelia (yellow card) 53'; Osimhen (penalty missed) 72'; Politano (yellow card) 82'; Mário Rui (yellow card) 90+4'	Stadium: Stadio Renato Dall'Ara; Attendance: 26,621; Referee: Giovanni Ayroldi

27 September 2023 6	Napoli	4–1	Udinese	Naples
20:45 CEST (UTC+2)	Zieliński 19' (pen.); Osimhen 39'; Kvaratskhelia 74'; Simeone (yellow card) 74', (goal) 81'	Report	Pérez (yellow card) 62'; Samardžić 81'	Stadium: Stadio Diego Armando Maradona; Attendance: 45,305; Referee: Gianluca Manganiello

30 September 2023 7	Lecce	0–4	Napoli	Lecce
15:00 CEST (UTC+2)	Gallo (yellow card) 36'; Ramadani (yellow card) 57'; González (yellow card) 81'	Report	Østigård 16'; Simeone (yellow card) 17'; Kvaratskhelia (yellow card) 33'; Osimhen 51'; Gaetano 88'; Politano 90+4' (pen.)	Stadium: Stadio Via del mare Attendance: 27,588; Referee: Luca Pairetto

8 October 2023 8	Napoli	1–3	Fiorentina	Naples
20:45 CEST (UTC+2)	Osimhen 45+5' (pen.); Simeone (yellow card) 90+1'; Cajuste (yellow card) 90+5'	Report	Brekalo 7'; Terracciano (yellow card) 45+4'; Bonaventura 63', (yellow card) 70'; Martínez Quarta (yellow card) 69'; Ranieri (yellow card) 89'; González 90+3'	Stadium: Stadio Diego Armando Maradona; Attendance: 47,500; Referee: Federico La Penna

21 October 2023 9	Hellas Verona	1–3	Napoli	Verona
15:00 CEST (UTC+2)	Magnani (yellow card) 37'; Faraoni (yellow card) 45'; Lazović 60'; Bonazzoli (yellow card) 65'	Report	Politano 27'; Kvaratskhelia 43', 55'; Mário Rui (yellow card) 45'; Lindstrøm (yellow card) 80'	Stadium: Stadio Marcantonio Bentegodi; Attendance: 20,549; Referee: Rosario Abisso

29 October 2023 10	Napoli	2–2	Milan	Naples
20:45 CET (UTC+1)	Politano 50'; Natan (yellow card) 53' (yellow-red card) 89'; Raspadori 63'; Di Lorenzo (yellow card) 65'; Zanoli (yellow card) 86'	Report	Giroud 22', 31'; Reijnders (yellow card) 55'; Romero (yellow card) 62'; Musah (yellow card) 78'	Stadium: Stadio Diego Armando Maradona; Attendance: 52,250; Referee: Daniele Orsato

4 November 2023 11	Salernitana	0–2	Napoli	Salerno
15:00 CET (UTC+1)	Mazzocchi (yellow card) 68'	Report	Raspadori 13'; Elmas 82'; Di Lorenzo (yellow card) 88'	Stadium: Stadio Arechi; Attendance: 16,812; Referee: Antonio Rapuano

12 November 2023 12	Napoli	0–1	Empoli	Naples
12:30 CET (UTC+1)	Cajuste (yellow card) 90+3'	Report	Cancellieri (yellow card) 78'; Kovalenko 90+1'	Stadium: Stadio Diego Armando Maradona; Attendance: 50,500; Referee: Alessandro Prontera

25 November 2023 13	Atalanta	1–2	Napoli	Bergamo
18:00 CET (UTC+1)	Djimsiti (yellow card) 27'; Lookman 53'; Kolašinac (yellow card) 64'	Report	Natan (yellow card) 21'; Kvaratskhelia 44'; Di Lorenzo (yellow card) 60'; Elmas 79'	Stadium: Gewiss Stadium; Attendance: 14,743; Referee: Maurizio Mariani

3 December 2023 14	Napoli	0–3	Internazionale	Naples
20:45 CET (UTC+1)	Elmas (yellow card) 58'; Rrahmani (yellow card) 73'	Report	Çalhanoğlu 44'; Barella 61'; Darmian (yellow card) 78'; Thuram 85', (yellow card) 85'	Stadium: Stadio Diego Armando Maradona; Attendance: 51,000; Referee: Davide Massa

8 December 2023 15	Juventus	1–0	Napoli	Turin
20:45 CET (UTC+1)	Gatti 51'; Bremer (yellow card) 58'; Locatelli (yellow card) 90+5'	Report	Kvaratskhelia (yellow card) 45+1'; Juan Jesus (yellow card) 63'; Østigård (yellow card) 86'; Osimhen (yellow card) 90+5'	Stadium: Juventus Stadium; Attendance: 41,400; Referee: Daniele Orsato

16 December 2023 16	Napoli	2–1	Cagliari	Naples
18:30 CET (UTC+1)	Osimhen (yellow card) 45', (goal) 69'; Rrahmani (yellow card) 45+4'; Kvaratskhelia 75'; Mário Rui (yellow card) 85'; Politano (yellow card) 88'; Zambo Anguissa (yellow card) 90+1'	Report	Goldaniga (yellow card) 45+2'; Pavoletti (yellow card) 45+3', (goal) 72'; Augello (yellow card) 63'	Stadium: Stadio Diego Armando Maradona; Attendance: 45,000; Referee: Matteo Marcenaro
Note: The match was originally scheduled for 18:00, but was delayed by half an hour due to strong winds.

23 December 2023 17	Roma	2–0	Napoli	Rome
20:45 CET (UTC+1)	Paredes (yellow card) 29'; Kristensen (yellow card) 32'; Cristante (yellow card) 38'; Belotti (yellow card) 60'; Zalewski (yellow card) 66'; Pellegrini 76'; El Shaarawy (yellow card) 82'; Azmoun (yellow card) 90+5'; Lukaku 90+6'	Report	Mário Rui (yellow card) 28'; Juan Jesus (yellow card) 62'; Politano (red card) 66'; Osimhen (yellow card) 73' (yellow-red card) 86'	Stadium: Stadio Olimpico; Attendance: 62,141; Referee: Andrea Colombo

29 December 2023 18	Napoli	0–0	Monza	Naples
18:30 CET (UTC+1)	Juan Jesus (yellow card) 66'; Di Lorenzo (yellow card) 67'; Gaetano (yellow card) 80'; Kvaratskhelia (yellow card) 82'	Report	Pereira (yellow card) 32'; Birindelli (yellow card) 50'; Pessina (penalty missed) 68'; Cittadini (yellow card) 79'; Bondo (yellow card) 83'; Marić (red card) 90+5'	Stadium: Stadio Diego Armando Maradona; Attendance: 50,636; Referee: Marco Di Bello
Note: Marić was sent off for dissent as an unused substitute.

7 January 2024 19	Torino	3–0	Napoli	Turin
15:00 CET (UTC+1)	Sanabria 43'; Vlašić 52'; Buongiorno 66'	Report	Zieliński (yellow card) 37'; Mazzocchi (red card) 50'; Juan Jesus (yellow card) 61'	Stadium: Stadio Olimpico Grande Torino; Attendance: 23,960; Referee: Maurizio Mariani

13 January 2024 20	Napoli	2–1	Salernitana	Naples
15:00 CET (UTC+1)	Cajuste (yellow card) 34'; Politano 45+4' (pen.); Rrahmani 90+6', (yellow card) 90+6'; Kvaratskhelia (yellow card) 90+10'	Report	Candreva 29'; Łęgowski (yellow card) 43'; Bradarić (yellow card) 90+5'	Stadium: Stadio Diego Armando Maradona; Attendance: 35,000; Referee: Livio Marinelli

28 January 2024 22	Lazio	0–0	Napoli	Rome
18:00 CET (UTC+1)	Romagnoli (yellow card) 55'; Gila (yellow card) 69'; Cataldi (yellow card) 82'	Report	Demme (yellow card) 49'; Østigård (yellow card) 90+5'	Stadium: Stadio Olimpico; Attendance: 30,000; Referee: Daniele Orsato

4 February 2024 23	Napoli	2–1	Hellas Verona	Naples
15:00 CET (UTC+1)	Mário Rui (yellow card) 46'; Lindstrøm (yellow card) 66'; Lobotka (yellow card) 76'; Dawidowicz 79' (o.g.); Kvaratskhelia 87'	Report	Coppola (yellow card) 33', (goal) 72'; Suslov (yellow card) 54'	Stadium: Stadio Diego Armando Maradona; Attendance: 44,000; Referee: Marco Piccinini

11 February 2024 24	Milan	1–0	Napoli	Milan
20:45 CET (UTC+1)	Hernandez 25', (yellow card) 90+6'	Report	Juan Jesus (yellow card) 85'	Stadium: San Siro; Attendance: 73,891; Referee: Daniele Doveri

17 February 2024 25	Napoli	1–1	Genoa	Naples
15:00 CET (UTC+1)	Østigård (yellow card) 26'; Kvaratskhelia (yellow card) 42'; Di Lorenzo (yellow card) 54'; Ngonge 90'	Report	Frendrup 47'; Vásquez (yellow card) 50'; Vitinha (yellow card) 90+3'	Stadium: Stadio Diego Armando Maradona; Attendance: 50,000; Referee: Juan Luca Sacchi

25 February 2024 26	Cagliari	1–1	Napoli	Cagliari
15:00 CET (UTC+1)	Lapadula (yellow card) 36'; Luvumbo (yellow card) 48', (goal) 90+6'; Nández (yellow card) 68'; Deiola (yellow card) 86'	Report	Osimhen 66'; Olivera (yellow card) 90+1'	Stadium: Unipol Domus; Attendance: 16,382; Referee: Luca Pairetto

28 February 2024 21	Sassuolo	1–6	Napoli	Reggio Emilia
18:00 CET (UTC+1)	Račić 17'	Report	Rrahmani 29'; Osimhen 31', 41', 47'; Kvaratskhelia 51', 75'	Stadium: Mapei Stadium – Città del Tricolore; Attendance: 17,085; Referee: Daniele Chiffi
Note: The match was originally scheduled for 21 January 2024, but was postponed due to Napoli's participation in the 2023 Supercoppa Italiana.

3 March 2024 27	Napoli	2–1	Juventus	Naples
20:45 CET (UTC+1)	Kvaratskhelia 42'; Traorè (yellow card) 47'; Osimhen (penalty missed) 88'; Raspadori 88'	Report	Vlahović (yellow card) 18'; Bremer (yellow card) 26'; Cambiaso (yellow card) 28'; Chiesa 81'; Nonge (yellow card) 86'	Stadium: Stadio Diego Armando Maradona; Attendance: 50,000; Referee: Maurizio Mariani

8 March 2024 28	Napoli	1–1	Torino	Naples
20:45 CET (UTC+1)	Osimhen (yellow card) 36'; Juan Jesus (yellow card) 39'; Kvaratskhelia 61'	Report	Zapata (yellow card) 32'; Buongiorno (yellow card) 45+3'; Sanabria 64'	Stadium: Stadio Diego Armando Maradona; Attendance: 47,000; Referee: Daniele Orsato

17 March 2024 29	Internazionale	1–1	Napoli	Milan
20:45 CET (UTC+1)	Pavard (yellow card) 36'; Darmian 43'; Barella (yellow card) 54'	Report	Lobotka (yellow card) 52'; Juan Jesus 81'	Stadium: San Siro; Attendance: 71,551; Referee: Federico La Penna

30 March 2024 30	Napoli	0–3	Atalanta	Naples
12:30 CET (UTC+1)	Osimhen (yellow card) 38'; Di Lorenzo (yellow card) 84'	Report	Miranchuk 26'; Scamacca 45'; Kolašinac (yellow card) 54'; Koopmeiners (yellow card) 82', (goal) 88'	Stadium: Stadio Diego Armando Maradona; Attendance: 49,500; Referee: Luca Pairetto

7 April 2024 31	Monza	2–4	Napoli	Monza
15:00 CEST (UTC+2)	Đurić 9'; Akpa Akpro (yellow card) 46'; Colpani 62'; Donati (yellow card) 84'; Caldirola (yellow card) 90'	Report	Ngonge (yellow card) 41'; Osimhen 55'; Politano 57'; Zieliński 61'; Raspadori 68'	Stadium: Stadio Brianteo; Attendance: 13,169; Referee: Daniele Doveri

14 April 2024 32	Napoli	2–2	Frosinone	Naples
12:30 CEST (UTC+2)	Politano 16'; Rrahmani (yellow card) 29'; Osimhen 63'; Mário Rui (yellow card) 66' (yellow-red card) 90+8'	Report	Soulé (penalty missed) 30'; Cheddira 50', 73'; Okoli (yellow card) 90+7'	Stadium: Stadio Diego Armando Maradona; Attendance: 51,000; Referee: Michael Fabbri

20 April 2024 33	Empoli	1–0	Napoli	Empoli
18:00 CEST (UTC+2)	Cerri 4'; Pezzella (yellow card) 54'; Bereszyński (yellow card) 58'	Report	Juan Jesus (yellow card) 37'; Ngonge (yellow card) 90+3'	Stadium: Stadio Carlo Castellani; Attendance: 12,916; Referee: Gianluca Manganiello

28 April 2024 34	Napoli	2–2	Roma	Naples
18:00 CEST (UTC+2)	Olivera 65'; Rrahmani (yellow card) 75'; Zambo Anguissa (yellow card) 80'; Osimhen 84' (pen.)	Report	Dybala 59' (pen.); Abraham 89'	Stadium: Stadio Diego Armando Maradona; Attendance: 45,000; Referee: Simone Sozza

6 May 2024 35	Udinese	1–1	Napoli	Udine
20:45 CEST (UTC+2)	Success 90+2'	Report	Osimhen 51'	Stadium: Stadio Friuli; Attendance: 20,872; Referee: Gianluca Aureliano

11 May 2024 36	Napoli	0–2	Bologna	Naples
18:00 CEST (UTC+2)	Politano (penalty missed) 21'; Kvaratskhelia (yellow card) 33'; Cajuste (yellow card) 47'	Report	Ndoye 9'; Posch 12'; Lucumí (yellow card) 71'	Stadium: Stadio Diego Armando Maradona; Attendance: 43,000; Referee: Luca Pairetto

17 May 2024 37	Fiorentina	2–2	Napoli	Florence
20:45 CEST (UTC+2)	Biraghi 40'; Nzola 42'; Mandragora (yellow card) 84'	Report	Rrahmani 8'; Kvaratskhelia (yellow card) 41', (goal) 57'; Cajuste (yellow card) 70'	Stadium: Stadio Artemio Franchi; Attendance: 28,267; Referee: Matteo Marchetti

26 May 2024 38	Napoli	0–0	Lecce	Naples
18:00 CEST (UTC+2)		Report		Stadium: Stadio Diego Armando Maradona; Attendance: 41,000; Referee: Federico Dionisi

=== Coppa Italia ===
19 December 2023 Round of 16	Napoli	0–4	Frosinone	Naples
21:00 CET (UTC+1)	Cajuste (yellow card) 61'; Gaetano (yellow card) 74'; Politano (yellow card) 85'	Report	Bourabia (yellow card) 43'; Kvernadze (yellow card) 45+1'; Barrenechea 65'; Caso 70', (yellow card) 70'; Cheddira 90+1' (pen.); Harroui 90+5'	Stadium: Stadio Diego Armando Maradona; Attendance: 25,000; Referee: Rosario Abisso

=== Supercoppa Italiana ===
18 January 2024 Semi-finals	Napoli	3–0	Fiorentina	Riyadh, Saudi Arabia
22:00 SAST (UTC+3)	Simeone 22'; Zerbin 84', 86'	Report	Ikoné (penalty missed) 44'; Biraghi (yellow card) 51'	Stadium: KSU Stadium; Attendance: 9,762; Referee: Federico La Penna

22 January 2024 Final	Napoli	0–1	Internazionale	Riyadh, Saudi Arabia
22:00 SAST (UTC+3)	Rrahmani (yellow card) 42'; Zerbin (yellow card) 46'; Simeone (yellow card) 55' (yellow-red card) 60'; Gaetano (yellow card) 90'	Report	Çalhanoğlu (yellow card) 44'; De Vrij (yellow card) 47'; Barella (yellow card) 55'; Martínez 90+1', (yellow card) 90+2'	Stadium: KSU Stadium; Attendance: 24,900; Referee: Antonio Rapuano

=== UEFA Champions League ===
==== Group stage ====
The draw for the group stage was held on 31 August 2023.

Pos	Team	Pld	W	D	L	GF	GA	GD	Pts	Qualification	RMA	NAP	BRA	UNB
1	(Spain) Real Madrid	6	6	0	0	16	7	+9	18	Advance to knockout phase	—	4–2	3–0	1–0
2	(Italy) Napoli	6	3	1	2	10	9	+1	10	Advance to knockout phase	2–3	—	2–0	1–1
3	(Portugal) Braga	6	1	1	4	6	12	−6	4	Transfer to Europa League	1–2	1–2	—	1–1
4	(Germany) Union Berlin	6	0	2	4	6	10	−4	2		2–3	0–1	2–3	—

Source: UEFA
Rules for classification: Group stage tiebreakers

20 September 2023 1	Braga (Portugal)	1–2	(Italy) Napoli	Braga, Portugal
20:00 WEST (UTC+1)	Djaló (yellow card) 44'; Fonte (yellow card) 55'; Borja (yellow card) 66'; Bruma 84'	Report	Zambo Anguissa (yellow card) 19'; Osimhen (yellow card) 41'; Di Lorenzo 45+1'; Politano (yellow card) 56'; Raspadori (yellow card) 79'; Olivera (yellow card) 86'; Niakaté 88' (o.g.); Juan Jesus (yellow card) 90+3'	Stadium: Estádio Municipal; Attendance: 18,422; Referee: Serdar Gözübüyük (Netherlands)

3 October 2023 2	Napoli (Italy)	2–3	(Spain) Real Madrid	Naples
21:00 CEST (UTC+2)	Østigård 19'; Natan (yellow card) 45'; Zieliński 54' (pen.)	Report	Vinícius 27'; Camavinga (yellow card) 29'; Bellingham 34', (yellow card) 70'; Meret 78' (o.g.); Arrizabalaga (yellow card) 89'	Stadium: Stadio Diego Armando Maradona; Attendance: 51,649; Referee: Clément Turpin (France)

24 October 2023 3	Union Berlin (Germany)	0–1	(Italy) Napoli	Berlin, Germany
21:00 CEST (UTC+2)	Trimmel (yellow card) 10'; Gosens (yellow card) 51'; Haberer (yellow card) 53'	Report	Rrahmani (yellow card) 17'; Raspadori 65'	Stadium: Olympiastadion; Attendance: 72,062; Referee: Irfan Peljto (Bosnia and Herzegovina)
Note: The match was played at the Olympiastadion in Berlin, instead of Union Berlin's regular stadium, the Stadion An der Alten Försterei, which did not meet UEFA requirements.

8 November 2023 4	Napoli (Italy)	1–1	(Germany) Union Berlin	Naples
18:45 CET (UTC+1)	Politano 39'; Simeone (yellow card) 89'	Report	Bonucci (yellow card) 41'; Fofana 52'; Jaeckel (yellow card) 67'; Tousart (yellow card) 76'	Stadium: Stadio Diego Armando Maradona; Attendance: 42,449; Referee: Danny Makkelie (Netherlands)

29 November 2023 5	Real Madrid (Spain)	4–2	(Italy) Napoli	Madrid, Spain
21:00 CET (UTC+1)	Rodrygo 11'; Bellingham 22'; Paz 84'; Joselu 90+4'	Report	Simeone 9'; Zambo Anguissa 47'; Zieliński (yellow card) 49'; Cajuste (yellow card) 90'	Stadium: Santiago Bernabéu; Attendance: 73,562; Referee: François Letexier (France)

12 December 2023 6	Napoli (Italy)	2–0	(Portugal) Braga	Naples
21:00 CET (UTC+1)	Saatçı 9' (o.g.); Osimhen 33'	Report	Banza (yellow card) 19'; Mendes (yellow card) 83'	Stadium: Stadio Diego Armando Maradona; Attendance: 37,841; Referee: Slavko Vinčić (Slovenia)

==== Knockout phase ====
===== Round of 16 =====
The draw for the round of 16 was held on 18 December 2023.

21 February 2024 First leg	Napoli (Italy)	1–1	(Spain) Barcelona	Naples
21:00 CET (UTC+1)	Osimhen 75'	Report	De Jong (yellow card) 16'; Lewandowski 60'; Martínez (yellow card) 76'; Christensen (yellow card) 78'	Stadium: Stadio Diego Armando Maradona; Attendance: 49,529; Referee: Felix Zwayer (Germany)

12 March 2024 Second leg	Barcelona (Spain)	3–1 (4–2 agg.)	(Italy) Napoli	Barcelona, Spain
21:00 CET (UTC+1)	López 15'; Cancelo 17'; Christensen (yellow card) 19'; Yamal (yellow card) 44'; Lewandowski 83'	Report	Rrahmani 30'; Juan Jesus (yellow card) 45+2'; Traorè (yellow card) 63'; Olivera (yellow card) 67'	Stadium: Estadi Olímpic Lluís Companys; Attendance: 50,301; Referee: Danny Makkelie (Netherlands)
Note: The match was played at the Estadi Olímpic Lluís Companys, instead of Barcelona's regular stadium, Camp Nou, which was being renovated.

== Statistics ==
=== Appearances and goals ===
No.	Pos	Nat	Player	Total		Serie A		Coppa Italia		Supercoppa Italiana		Champions League	
No.	Pos	Nat	Player	Apps	Goals	Apps	Goals	Apps	Goals	Apps	Goals	Apps	Goals
Goalkeepers
1	GK	(Italy) ITA	Alex Meret	39	0	31	0	0	0	0	0	8	0
14	GK	(Ukraine) UKR	Nikita Contini	1	0	0+1	0	0	0	0	0	0	0
16	GK	(Poland) POL	Hubert Idasiak	0	0	0	0	0	0	0	0	0	0
95	GK	(Italy) ITA	Pierluigi Gollini	10	0	7	0	1	0	2	0	0	0
Defenders
3	DF	(Brazil) BRA	Natan	21	0	11+3	0	1	0	0	0	5+1	0
5	DF	(Brazil) BRA	Juan Jesus	31	1	23+1	1	0	0	2	0	5	0
6	DF	(Portugal) POR	Mário Rui	28	0	14+7	0	1	0	1+1	0	3+1	0
13	DF	(Kosovo) KOS	Amir Rrahmani	39	4	30	3	0	0	2	0	7	1
17	DF	(Uruguay) URU	Mathías Olivera	29	1	18+5	1	0	0	0	0	3+3	0
22	DF	(Italy) ITA	Giovanni Di Lorenzo	47	2	36	1	0+1	0	2	0	8	1
30	DF	(Italy) ITA	Pasquale Mazzocchi	12	0	4+6	0	0	0	2	0	0	0
55	DF	(Norway) NOR	Leo Skiri Østigård	32	2	18+7	1	1	0	0+2	0	1+3	1
Midfielders
4	MF	(Germany) GER	Diego Demme	3	0	1+1	0	1	0	0	0	0	0
8	MF	(Ivory Coast) CIV	Hamed Traorè	11	0	5+4	0	0	0	0	0	1+1	0
20	MF	(Poland) POL	Piotr Zieliński	35	4	23+5	3	0	0	0+1	0	6	1
24	MF	(Sweden) SWE	Jens Cajuste	35	0	11+15	0	1	0	2	0	2+4	0
29	MF	(Denmark) DEN	Jesper Lindstrøm	29	0	2+20	0	1	0	0+2	0	0+4	0
32	MF	(Belgium) BEL	Leander Dendoncker	3	0	0+3	0	0	0	0	0	0	0
38	MF	(Italy) ITA	Lorenzo Russo	0	0	0	0	0	0	0	0	0	0
68	MF	(Slovakia) SVK	Stanislav Lobotka	49	0	38	0	0+1	0	2	0	8	0
99	MF	(Cameroon) CMR	André-Frank Zambo Anguissa	41	1	32+2	0	0	0	0	0	7	1
Forwards
9	FW	(Nigeria) NGR	Victor Osimhen	32	17	22+3	15	0+1	0	0	0	5+1	2
18	FW	(Argentina) ARG	Giovanni Simeone	37	3	8+20	1	1	0	2	1	1+5	1
21	FW	(Italy) ITA	Matteo Politano	48	9	31+6	8	0+1	0	2	0	8	1
26	FW	(Belgium) BEL	Cyril Ngonge	14	1	1+12	1	0	0	0	0	0+1	0
77	FW	(Georgia (country)) GEO	Khvicha Kvaratskhelia	45	11	32+2	11	0+1	0	2	0	8	0
81	FW	(Italy) ITA	Giacomo Raspadori	46	6	14+22	5	1	0	0+1	0	2+6	1
Players transferred out during the season
7	MF	(North Macedonia) MKD	Eljif Elmas	16	2	4+7	2	0	0	0	0	0+5	0
23	FW	(Italy) ITA	Alessio Zerbin	9	2	1+6	0	0	0	1+1	2	0	0
59	DF	(Italy) ITA	Alessandro Zanoli	6	0	0+4	0	1	0	0	0	0+1	0
70	MF	(Italy) ITA	Gianluca Gaetano	13	1	1+8	1	1	0	0+2	0	0+1	0

Source: Competitions
