= Italy national football team results (2010–present) =

- Win Draw Loss

This is a list of the Italy national football team results from 2010 to the present day. During this period, Italy have achieved first place at UEFA Euro 2020, second place at UEFA Euro 2012 and the CONMEBOL–UEFA Cup of Champions, and third place at the 2013 FIFA Confederations Cup, 2020–21 UEFA Nations League and 2022–23 UEFA Nations League.

== Results ==
=== 2010 ===
3 March 2010 International friendly	Italy	0–0	Cameroon	Fontvieille, Monaco
20:45 CET (UTC+01:00)		Report		Stadium: Stade Louis II; Attendance: 10,752; Referee: Saïd Ennjimi (France)

3 June 2010 International friendly	Italy	1–2	Mexico	Brussels, Belgium
19:15 CEST (UTC+02:00)	Bonucci 89'	Report	Vela 18'; Medina 84'	Stadium: Stade Roi Baudouin; Attendance: 30,000; Referee: Johan Verbist (Belgium)

5 June 2010 International friendly	Switzerland	1–1	Italy	Genève, Switzerland
20:45 CEST (UTC+02:00)	Inler 10'	Report	Quagliarella 14'	Stadium: Stade de Genève; Attendance: 30,000; Referee: Hervé Piccirillo (France)

14 June 2010 2010 FIFA World Cup; Group F	Italy	1–1	Paraguay	Cape Town, South Africa
20:30 SAST (UTC+02:00)	De Rossi 63'	Report	Alcaraz 39'	Stadium: Cape Town Stadium; Attendance: 62,869; Referee: Benito Archundia (Mexico)

20 June 2010 2010 FIFA World Cup; Group F	Italy	1–1	New Zealand	Nelspruit, South Africa
16:00 SAST (UTC+02:00)	Iaquinta 29' (pen.)	Report	Smeltz 7'	Stadium: Mbombela Stadium; Attendance: 38,229; Referee: Carlos Batres (Guatemala)

24 June 2010 2010 FIFA World Cup; Group F	Slovakia	3–2	Italy	Johannesburg, South Africa
16:00 SAST (UTC+02:00)	Vittek 25', 73'; Kopúnek 89'	Report	Di Natale 81'; Quagliarella 90+2'	Stadium: Ellis Park Stadium; Attendance: 53,412; Referee: Howard Webb (England)

10 August 2010^{1} International friendly	Italy	0–1	Ivory Coast	London, England
19:45 BST (UTC+01:00)		Report	K. Touré 55'	Stadium: Upton Park; Attendance: 11,000; Referee: Martin Atkinson (England)

3 September 2010 UEFA Euro 2012 qualifying Group C	Estonia	1–2	Italy	Tallinn, Estonia
21:30 EEST (UTC+03:00)	Zenjov 31'	Report	Cassano 60'; Bonucci 63'	Stadium: A. Le Coq Arena; Attendance: 8,600; Referee: Carlos Velasco Carballo (Spain)

7 September 2010 UEFA Euro 2012 qualifying Group C	Italy	5–0	Faroe Islands	Florence, Italy
20:50 CEST (UTC+02:00)	Gilardino 11'; De Rossi 22'; Cassano 27'; Quagliarella 81'; Pirlo 90'	Report		Stadium: Stadio Artemio Franchi; Attendance: 19,266; Referee: Aleksei Kulbakov (Belarus)

8 October 2010 UEFA Euro 2012 qualifying Group C	Northern Ireland	0–0	Italy	Belfast, Northern Ireland
19:45 BST (UTC+01:00)		Report		Stadium: Windsor Park; Attendance: 15,200; Referee: Tony Chapron (France)

12 October 2010 UEFA Euro 2012 qualifying Group C	Italy	3–0	Serbia	Genoa, Italy
20:50 CEST (UTC+02:00)		Match awarded		Stadium: Stadio Luigi Ferraris; Attendance: 30,000; Referee: Craig Thomson (Scotland)
Note: Match abandoned after six minutes following Serbian crowd disturbances, later awarded as a 3–0 forfeit win to Italy by UEFA.

17 November 2010 International friendly	Italy	1–1	Romania	Klagenfurt, Austria
20:30 CEST (UTC+02:00)	Marica 82' (o.g.)	Report	Marica 34'	Stadium: Wörthersee Stadion; Attendance: 14,000; Referee: Thomas Einwaller (Austria)

=== 2011 ===
9 February 2011 International friendly	Germany	1–1	Italy	Dortmund, Germany
20:45 CET (UTC+01:00)	Klose 17'	Report	Rossi 81'	Stadium: Westfalenstadion; Attendance: 60,196; Referee: Eric Braamhaar (Netherlands)

25 March 2011 UEFA Euro 2012 qualifying Group C	Slovenia	0–1	Italy	Ljubljana, Slovenia
20:45 CET (UTC+01:00)		Report	Motta 73'	Stadium: Stožice Stadium; Attendance: 15,790; Referee: Felix Brych (Germany)

29 March 2011 International friendly	Ukraine	0–2	Italy	Kyiv, Ukraine
21:45 EEST (UTC+03:00)		Report	Rossi 27'; Matri 81'	Stadium: Lobanovsky Dynamo Stadium; Attendance: 13,000; Referee: Alexei Nikolaev (Russia)

3 June 2011 UEFA Euro 2012 qualifying Group C	Italy	3–0	Estonia	Modena, Italy
20:45 CEST (UTC+02:00)	Rossi 21'; Cassano 39'; Pazzini 68'	Report		Stadium: Stadio Alberto Braglia; Attendance: 19,434; Referee: Alexandru Dan Tudor (Romania)

7 June 2011 International friendly	Italy	0–2	Republic of Ireland	Liège, Belgium
20:45 CEST (UTC+02:00)		Report	Andrews 36'; Cox 89'	Stadium: Stade Maurice Dufrasne; Attendance: 25,516; Referee: Serge Gumienny (Belgium)

10 August 2011 International friendly	Italy	2–1	Spain	Bari, Italy
20:45 CEST (UTC+02:00)	Montolivo 11'; Aquilani 84'	Report	Alonso 37' (pen.)	Stadium: Stadio San Nicola; Attendance: 50,000; Referee: Felix Brych (Germany)

2 September 2011 UEFA Euro 2012 qualifying Group C	Faroe Islands	0–1	Italy	Tórshavn, Faroe Islands
19:45 WEST (UTC+01:00)		Report	Cassano 11'	Stadium: Tórsvøllur; Attendance: 5,654; Referee: Tamás Bognár (Hungary)

6 September 2011 UEFA Euro 2012 qualifying Group C	Italy	1–0	Slovenia	Florence, Italy
20:45 CEST (UTC+02:00)	Pazzini 85'	Report		Stadium: Stadio Artemio Franchi; Attendance: 18,000; Referee: Svein Oddvar Moen (Norway)

7 October 2011 UEFA Euro 2012 qualifying Group C	Serbia	1–1	Italy	Belgrade, Serbia
20:45 CEST (UTC+02:00)	Ivanović 26'	Report	Marchisio 1'	Stadium: Stadion Crvena Zvezda; Attendance: 35,000; Referee: Pedro Proença (Portugal)

11 October 2011 UEFA Euro 2012 qualifying Group C	Italy	3–0	Northern Ireland	Pescara, Italy
20:45 CEST (UTC+02:00)	Cassano 21', 53'; McAuley 74' (o.g.)	Report		Stadium: Stadio Adriatico; Attendance: 19,480; Referee: Antonio Mateu Lahoz (Spain)

11 November 2011 International friendly	Poland	0–2	Italy	Wrocław, Poland
20:45 CET (UTC+01:00)		Report	Balotelli 30'; Pazzini 60'	Stadium: Stadion Miejski; Attendance: 44,000; Referee: Laurent Duhamel (France)

15 November 2011 International friendly	Italy	0–1	Uruguay	Rome, Italy
20:45 CET (UTC+01:00)		Report	Fernández 3'	Stadium: Stadio Olimpico; Attendance: 42,000; Referee: Duarte Gomes (Portugal)

=== 2012 ===
29 February 2012 International friendly	Italy	0–1	United States	Genoa, Italy
20:45 CET (UTC+01:00)		Report	Dempsey 55'	Stadium: Stadio Luigi Ferraris; Attendance: 15,000; Referee: Fırat Aydınus (Turkey)

1 June 2012 International friendly	Italy	0–3	Russia	Zürich, Switzerland
20:45 CEST (UTC+02:00)		Report	Kerzhakov 60'; Shirokov 75', 89'	Stadium: Stadion Letzigrund; Attendance: 19,032; Referee: Nikolaj Hänni (Switzerland)

10 June 2012 UEFA Euro 2012; Group C	Spain	1–1	Italy	Gdańsk, Poland
18:00 CEST (UTC+02:00)	Fàbregas 64'	Report	Di Natale 61'	Stadium: PGE Arena Gdańsk; Attendance: 38,869; Referee: Viktor Kassai (Hungary)

14 June 2012 UEFA Euro 2012; Group C	Italy	1–1	Croatia	Poznań, Poland
18:00 CEST (UTC+02:00)	Pirlo 39'	Report	Mandžukić 72'	Stadium: Municipal Stadium; Attendance: 37,096; Referee: Howard Webb (England)

18 June 2012 UEFA Euro 2012; Group C	Italy	2–0	Republic of Ireland	Poznań, Poland
20:45 CEST (UTC+02:00)	Cassano 35'; Balotelli 90'	Report		Stadium: Municipal Stadium; Attendance: 37,096; Referee: Cüneyt Çakır (Turkey)

24 June 2012 UEFA Euro 2012; Quarter-final	England	0–0 (a.e.t.) (2–4 p)	Italy	Kyiv, Ukraine
21:45 EEST (UTC+03:00)		Report		Stadium: Olympic Stadium; Attendance: 64,340; Referee: Pedro Proença (Portugal)
	Penalties
	Gerrard (penalty scored); Rooney (penalty scored); Young (penalty missed); Cole (penalty missed)		(penalty scored) Balotelli; (penalty missed) Montolivo; (penalty scored) Pirlo; (penalty scored) Nocerino; (penalty scored) Diamanti

28 June 2012 UEFA Euro 2012; Semi-final	Germany	1–2	Italy	Warsaw, Poland
20:45 CEST (UTC+02:00)	Özil 90+2' (pen.)	Report	Balotelli 20', 36'	Stadium: National Stadium; Attendance: 55,540; Referee: Stéphane Lannoy (France)

1 July 2012 UEFA Euro 2012; Final	Spain	4–0	Italy	Kyiv, Ukraine
21:45 EEST (UTC+03:00)	Silva 14'; Alba 41'; Torres 84'; Mata 88'	Report		Stadium: Olympic Stadium; Attendance: 63,170; Referee: Pedro Proença (Portugal)

15 August 2012 International friendly	England	2–1	Italy	Bern, Switzerland
21:00 CEST (UTC+02:00)	Jagielka 28'; Defoe 80'	Report	De Rossi 15'	Stadium: Wankdorf Stadium; Attendance: 15,000; Referee: Sascha Kever (Switzerland)

7 September 2012 2014 FIFA World Cup qualification Group B	Bulgaria	2–2	Italy	Sofia, Bulgaria
21:45 EEST (UTC+03:00)	Manolev 30'; G. Milanov 66'	Report	Osvaldo 36', 40'	Stadium: Vasil Levski National Stadium; Attendance: 12,993; Referee: Martin Atkinson (England)

11 September 2012 2014 FIFA World Cup qualification Group B	Italy	2–0	Malta	Modena, Italy
20:45 CEST (UTC+02:00)	Destro 5'; Peluso 90+2'	Report		Stadium: Stadio Alberto Braglia; Attendance: 18,000; Referee: Antti Munukka (Finland)

12 October 2012 2014 FIFA World Cup qualification Group B	Armenia	1–3	Italy	Yerevan, Armenia
21:00 UTC+4	Mkhitaryan 28'	Report	Pirlo 11' (pen.); De Rossi 64'; Osvaldo 82'	Stadium: Hrazdan Stadium; Attendance: 25,000; Referee: Marijo Strahonja (Croatia)

16 October 2012 2014 FIFA World Cup qualification Group B	Italy	3–1	Denmark	Milan, Italy
20:45 CEST (UTC+02:00)	Montolivo 34'; De Rossi 37'; Balotelli 54'	Report	Kvist 45+1'	Stadium: Stadio Giuseppe Meazza; Attendance: 37,027; Referee: Damir Skomina (Slovenia)

14 November 2012 International friendly	Italy	1–2	France	Parma, Italy
20:50 CET (UTC+01:00)	El Shaarawy 35'	Report	Valbuena 37'; Gomis 67'	Stadium: Stadio Ennio Tardini; Attendance: 20,000; Referee: Alberto Undiano Mallenco (Spain)

=== 2013 ===
6 February 2013 International friendly	Netherlands	1–1	Italy	Amsterdam, Netherlands
20:30 CET (UTC+01:00)	Lens 33'	Report	Verratti 90+1'	Stadium: Amsterdam Arena; Attendance: 45,000; Referee: Cüneyt Çakır (Turkey)

21 March 2013 International friendly	Italy	2–2	Brazil	Geneva, Switzerland
20:30 CET (UTC+01:00)	De Rossi 54'; Balotelli 56'	Report	Fred 33'; Oscar 42'	Stadium: Stade de Genève; Attendance: 28,000; Referee: Stephan Studer (Switzerland)

26 March 2013 2014 FIFA World Cup qualification Group B	Malta	0–2	Italy	Ta' Qali, Malta
20:45 CET (UTC+01:00)		Report	Balotelli 8' (pen.), 45'	Stadium: Ta' Qali National Stadium; Attendance: 17,011; Referee: Serdar Gözübüyük (Netherlands)

31 May 2013 International friendly	Italy	4–0	San Marino	Bologna, Italy
20:45 CEST (UTC+02:00)	Poli 28'; Gilardino 34'; Pirlo 50'; Aquilani 79'	Report		Stadium: Renato Dall'Ara; Attendance: 24,804; Referee: Marco Borg (Malta)

7 June 2013 2014 FIFA World Cup qualification Group B	Czech Republic	0–0	Italy	Prague, Czech Republic
20:45 CEST (UTC+02:00)		Report		Stadium: Generali Arena; Attendance: 18,235; Referee: Svein Oddvar Moen (Norway)

11 June 2013 International friendly	Italy	2–2	Haiti	Rio de Janeiro, Brazil
20:45 CEST (UTC+02:00)	Giaccherini 1'; Marchisio 72'	Report	Millien 85' (pen.); Peguero 90+2'	Stadium: Estádio São Januário; Attendance: 15,000; Referee: Marcelo de Lima Henrique (Brazil)

16 June 2013 2013 FIFA Confederations Cup; Group A	Mexico	1–2	Italy	Rio de Janeiro, Brazil
16:00 BRST (UTC−02:00)	Hernández 34' (pen.)	Report	Pirlo 27'; Balotelli 78'	Stadium: Estádio do Maracanã; Attendance: 73,123; Referee: Enrique Osses (Chile)

19 June 2013 2013 FIFA Confederations Cup; Group A	Italy	4–3	Japan	Recife, Brazil
19:00 BRST (UTC−03:00)	De Rossi 41'; Uchida 50' (o.g.); Balotelli 52' (pen.); Giovinco 86'	Report	Honda 21' (pen.); Kagawa 33'; Okazaki 69'	Stadium: Arena Pernambuco; Attendance: 40,489; Referee: Diego Abal (Argentina)

22 June 2013 2013 FIFA Confederations Cup; Group A	Italy	2–4	Brazil	Salvador, Brazil
16:00 BRST (UTC−03:00)	Giaccherini 51'; Chiellini 71'	Report	Dante 45+1'; Neymar 55'; Fred 66', 89'	Stadium: Arena Fonte Nova; Attendance: 48,874; Referee: Ravshan Irmatov (Uzbekistan)

27 June 2013 2013 FIFA Confederations Cup; Semi-final	Spain	0–0 (a.e.t.) (7–6 p)	Italy	Fortaleza, Brazil
16:00 BRST (UTC−03:00)		Report		Stadium: Estádio Castelão, Attendance: 56,083; Referee: Howard Webb (England)
	Penalties
	Xavi (penalty scored); Iniesta (penalty scored); Piqué (penalty scored); Ramos (penalty scored); Mata (penalty scored); Busquets (penalty scored); Navas (penalty scored)		(penalty scored) Candreva; (penalty scored) Aquilani; (penalty scored) De Rossi; (penalty scored) Giovinco; (penalty scored) Pirlo; (penalty scored) Montolivo; (penalty missed) Bonucci

30 June 2013 2013 FIFA Confederations Cup; Third place play-off	Uruguay	2–2 (a.e.t.) (2–3 p)	Italy	Salvador, Brazil
13:00 BRST (UTC−03:00)	Cavani 58', 78'	Report	Astori 24'; Diamanti 73'	Stadium: Arena Fonte Nova; Attendance: 43,382; Referee: Djamel Haimoudi (Algeria)
	Penalties
	Forlán (penalty missed); Cavani (penalty scored); Suárez (penalty scored); Cáceres (penalty missed); Gargano (penalty missed)		(penalty scored) Aquilani; (penalty scored) El Shaarawy; (penalty missed) De Sciglio; (penalty scored) Giaccherini

14 August 2013 International friendly	Italy	1–2	Argentina	Rome, Italy
20:45 CEST (UTC+02:00)	Insigne 75'	Report	Higuaín 21'; Banega 49'	Stadium: Stadio Olimpico; Attendance: 35,000; Referee: Wolfgang Stark (Germany)

6 September 2013 2014 FIFA World Cup qualification Group B	Italy	1−0	Bulgaria	Palermo, Italy
20:45 CEST (UTC+02:00)	Gilardino 38'	Report		Stadium: Stadio Renzo Barbera; Attendance: 28,662; Referee: Carlos Velasco Carballo (Spain)

10 September 2013 2014 FIFA World Cup qualification Group B	Italy	2–1	Czech Republic	Turin, Italy
20:45 CEST (UTC+02:00)	Chiellini 52'; Balotelli 54' (pen.)	Report	Kozák 19'	Stadium: Juventus Stadium; Attendance: 35,299; Referee: Jonas Eriksson (Sweden)

11 October 2013 2014 FIFA World Cup qualification Group B	Denmark	2–2	Italy	Copenhagen, Denmark
20:15 CEST (UTC+02:00)	Bendtner 45+1', 79'	Report	Osvaldo 28'; Aquilani 90+1'	Stadium: Parken Stadium; Attendance: 35,305; Referee: Stephane Lannoy (France)

15 October 2013 2014 FIFA World Cup qualification Group B	Italy	2–2	Armenia	Naples, Italy
20:45 CEST (UTC+02:00)	Florenzi 24'; Balotelli 76'	Report	Movsisyan 5'; Mkhitaryan 70'	Stadium: Stadio San Paolo; Attendance: 22,000; Referee: Michael Oliver (England)

15 November 2013 International friendly	Italy	1–1	Germany	Milan, Italy
20:45 CET (UTC+01:00)	Abate 28'	Report	Hummels 8'	Stadium: Stadio Giuseppe Meazza; Attendance: 40,000; Referee: Olegário Benquerença (Portugal)

18 November 2013 International friendly	Italy	2–2	Nigeria	London, England
19:45 GMT (UTC±00:00)	Rossi 12'; Giaccherini 47'	Report	Dike 35'; Ameobi 39'	Stadium: Craven Cottage; Attendance: 15,267; Referee: Martin Atkinson (England)

=== 2014 ===
5 March 2014 International friendly	Spain	1–0	Italy	Madrid, Spain
21:00 CET (UTC+01:00)	Pedro 63'	Report		Stadium: Vicente Calderón Stadium; Attendance: 35,000; Referee: Yevhen Aranovsky (Ukraine)

31 May 2014 International friendly	Italy	0–0	Republic of Ireland	London, England
19:45 BST (UTC+01:00)		Report		Stadium: Craven Cottage; Attendance: 22,879; Referee: Michael Oliver (England)

4 June 2014 International friendly	Italy	1–1	Luxembourg	Perugia, Italy
20:45 CEST (UTC+02:00)	Marchisio 9'	Report	Chanot 85'	Stadium: Stadio Renato Curi; Attendance: 28,000; Referee: Damir Skomina (Slovenia)

14 June 2014 2014 FIFA World Cup; Group D	England	1–2	Italy	Manaus, Brazil
19:00 UTC−04:00	Sturridge 37'	Report	Marchisio 35'; Balotelli 50'	Stadium: Arena Amazônia; Attendance: 39,800; Referee: Björn Kuipers (Netherlands)

20 June 2014 2014 FIFA World Cup; Group D	Italy	0–1	Costa Rica	Recife, Brazil
13:00 UTC−03:00		Report	Ruiz 44'	Stadium: Arena Pernambuco; Attendance: 40,285; Referee: Enrique Osses (Chile)

24 June 2014 2014 FIFA World Cup; Group D	Italy	0–1	Uruguay	Natal, Brazil
13:00 UTC−03:00		Report	Godín 81'	Stadium: Arena das Dunas; Attendance: 39,706; Referee: Marco Rodríguez (Mexico)

4 September 2014^{1} International friendly	Italy	2–0	Netherlands	Bari, Italy
20:45 CEST (UTC+02:00)	Immobile 3'; De Rossi 10' (pen.)	Report		Stadium: Stadio San Nicola; Attendance: 50,000; Referee: Sergei Karasev (Russia)

9 September 2014 UEFA Euro 2016 qualifying Group H	Norway	0–2	Italy	Oslo, Norway
20:45 CEST (UTC+02:00)		Report	Zaza 16'; Bonucci 62'	Stadium: Ullevaal Stadion; Attendance: 26,265; Referee: Milorad Mažić (Serbia)

10 October 2014 UEFA Euro 2016 qualifying Group H	Italy	2–1	Azerbaijan	Palermo, Italy
20:45 CEST (UTC+02:00)	Chiellini 44', 82'	Report	Chiellini 76' (o.g.)	Stadium: Stadio Renzo Barbera; Attendance: 33,000; Referee: Hüseyin Göçek (Turkey)

13 October 2014 UEFA Euro 2016 qualifying Group H	Malta	0–1	Italy	Ta'Qali, Malta
20:45 CEST (UTC+02:00)		Report	Pellè 23'	Stadium: Ta' Qali National Stadium; Attendance: 16,942; Referee: Ovidiu Hațegan (Romania)

16 November 2014 UEFA Euro 2016 qualifying Group H	Italy	1–1	Croatia	Milan, Italy
20:45 CET (UTC+01:00)	Candreva 11'	Report	Perišić 15'	Stadium: San Siro; Attendance: 63,222; Referee: Björn Kuipers (Netherlands)

18 November 2014 International friendly	Italy	1–0	Albania	Genoa, Italy
20:45 CET (UTC+01:00)	Okaka 82'	Report		Stadium: Stadio Luigi Ferraris; Attendance: 26,000; Referee: Alexander Harkam (Austria)

=== 2015 ===
28 March 2015 UEFA Euro 2016 qualifying Group H	Bulgaria	2–2	Italy	Sofia, Bulgaria
20:45 EET (UTC+02:00)	Popov 11'; Mitsanski 17'	Report	Minev 4' (o.g.); Éder 84'	Stadium: Vasil Levski National Stadium; Attendance: 6,000; Referee: Damir Skomina (Slovenia)

31 March 2015 International friendly	Italy	1–1	England	Turin, Italy
20:45 CEST (UTC+02:00)	Pellè 29'	Report	Townsend 79'	Stadium: Juventus Stadium; Attendance: 31,138; Referee: Felix Brych (Germany)

12 June 2015 UEFA Euro 2016 qualifying Group H	Croatia	1–1	Italy	Split, Croatia
20:45 CEST (UTC+02:00)	Mandžukić 11'	Report	Candreva 36' (pen.)	Stadium: Stadion Poljud; Attendance: 0 Referee: Martin Atkinson (England)

16 June 2015 International friendly	Italy	0–1	Portugal	Genève, Switzerland
20:30 CEST (UTC+02:00)		Report	Éder 52'	Stadium: Stade de Genève; Attendance: 18,024; Referee: Stephan Studer (Switzerland)

3 September 2015 UEFA Euro 2016 qualifying Group H	Italy	1–0	Malta	Florence, Italy
20:45 CEST (UTC+02:00)	Pellè 69'	Report		Stadium: Stadio Artemio Franchi; Attendance: 12,551; Referee: Ivan Kružliak (Slovakia)

6 September 2015 UEFA Euro 2016 qualifying Group H	Italy	1–0	Bulgaria	Palermo, Italy
20:45 CEST (UTC+02:00)	De Rossi 6' (pen.)	Report		Stadium: Stadio Renzo Barbera; Attendance: 21,000; Referee: Sergey Karasev (Russia)

10 October 2015 UEFA Euro 2016 qualifying Group H	Azerbaijan	1–3	Italy	Baku, Azerbaijan
18:00 CEST (UTC+02:00)	Nazarov 31'	Report	Éder 11'; El Shaarawy 43'; Darmian 65'	Stadium: Baku National Stadium; Attendance: 35,000; Referee: William Collum (Scotland)

13 October 2015 UEFA Euro 2016 qualifying Group H	Italy	2–1	Norway	Rome, Italy
20:45 CEST (UTC+02:00)	Florenzi 73'; Pellè 82'	Report	Tettey 23'	Stadium: Stadio Olimpico; Attendance: 30,000; Referee: Felix Brych (Germany)

13 November 2015 International friendly	Belgium	3–1	Italy	Brussels, Belgium
20:45 CET (UTC+01:00)	Vertonghen 13'; De Bruyne 74'; Batshuayi 82'	Report	Candreva 3'	Stadium: King Baudouin Stadium; Attendance: 45,000; Referee: Szymon Marciniak (Poland)

17 November 2015 International friendly	Italy	2–2	Romania	Bologna, Italy
20:45 CET (UTC+01:00)	Marchisio 55' (pen.); Gabbiadini 66'	Report	Stancu 8'; Andone 89'	Stadium: Stadio Renato Dall'Ara; Attendance: 20,000; Referee: Adrien Jaccottet (Switzerland)

=== 2016 ===
24 March 2016 International friendly	Italy	1–1	Spain	Udine, Italy
20:45 CET (UTC+01:00)	Insigne 68'	Report	Aduriz 70'	Stadium: Stadio Friuli; Attendance: 23,300; Referee: Deniz Aytekin (Germany)

29 March 2016 International friendly	Germany	4–1	Italy	Munich, Germany
20:45 CEST (UTC+02:00)	Kroos 24'; Götze 45'; Hector 59'; Özil 75' (pen.)	Report	El Shaarawy 83'	Stadium: Allianz Arena; Attendance: 62,653; Referee: Oliver Drachta (Austria)

29 May 2016 International friendly	Italy	1–0	Scotland	Ta' Qali, Malta
20:45 CEST (UTC+02:00)	Pellè 57'	Report		Stadium: Ta' Qali National Stadium; Attendance: 8,000; Referee: Alan Mario Sant (Malta)

6 June 2016 International friendly	Italy	2–0	Finland	Verona, Italy
20:45 CEST (UTC+02:00)	Candreva 27' (pen.); De Rossi 71'	Report		Stadium: Stadio Marc'Antonio Bentegodi; Attendance: 27,702; Referee: Bas Nijhuis (Netherlands)

13 June 2016 UEFA Euro 2016; Group E	Belgium	0–2	Italy	Lyon, France
21:00 CEST (UTC+02:00)		Report	Giaccherini 32'; Pellè 90+3'	Stadium: Parc Olympique Lyonnais; Attendance: 55,408; Referee: Mark Clattenburg (England)

17 June 2016 UEFA Euro 2016; Group E	Italy	1–0	Sweden	Toulouse, France
15:00 CEST (UTC+02:00)	Éder 88'	Report		Stadium: Stadium Municipal; Attendance: 29,600; Referee: Viktor Kassai (Hungary)

22 June 2016 UEFA Euro 2016; Group E	Italy	0–1	Republic of Ireland	Lille, France
21:00 CEST (UTC+02:00)		Report	Brady 85'	Stadium: Stade Pierre-Mauroy; Attendance: 44,268; Referee: Ovidiu Hațegan (Romania)

27 June 2016 UEFA Euro 2016; Round of 16	Italy	2–0	Spain	Saint-Denis, France
18:00 CEST (UTC+02:00)	Chiellini 33'; Pellè 90+1'	Report		Stadium: Stade de France; Attendance: 76,165; Referee: Cüneyt Çakır (Turkey)

2 July 2016 UEFA Euro 2016; Quarter-final	Germany	1–1 (a.e.t.) (6–5 p)	Italy	Bordeaux, France
21:00 CEST (UTC+02:00)	Özil 65'	Report	Bonucci 78' (pen.)	Stadium: Nouveau Stade de Bordeaux; Attendance: 38,764; Referee: Viktor Kassai (Hungary)
	Penalties
	Kroos (penalty scored); Müller (penalty missed); Özil (penalty missed); Draxler (penalty scored); Schweinsteiger (penalty missed); Hummels (penalty scored); Kimmich (penalty scored); Boateng (penalty scored); Hector (penalty scored)		(penalty scored) Insigne; (penalty missed) Zaza; (penalty scored) Barzagli; (penalty missed) Pellè; (penalty missed) Bonucci; (penalty scored) Giaccherini; (penalty scored) Parolo; (penalty scored) De Sciglio; (penalty missed) Darmian

1 September 2016^{1} International friendly	Italy	1–3	France	Bari, Italy
21:00 CEST (UTC+02:00)	Pellè 21'	Report	Martial 17'; Giroud 28'; Kurzawa 81'	Stadium: Stadio San Nicola; Attendance: 39,000; Referee: Björn Kuipers (Netherlands)

5 September 2016 2018 FIFA World Cup qualification Group G	Israel	1–3	Italy	Haifa, Israel
20:45 CEST (UTC+02:00)	Ben Haim II 35'	Report	Pellè 14'; Candreva 31' (pen.); Immobile 83'	Stadium: Sammy Ofer Stadium; Attendance: 30,000; Referee: Sergei Karasev (Russia)

6 October 2016 2018 FIFA World Cup qualification Group G	Italy	1–1	Spain	Turin, Italy
20:45 CEST (UTC+02:00)	De Rossi 82' (pen.)	Report	Vitolo 55'	Stadium: Juventus Stadium; Attendance: 38,470; Referee: Felix Brych (Germany)

9 October 2016 2018 FIFA World Cup qualification Group G	Macedonia	2–3	Italy	Skopje, Macedonia
20:45 CEST (UTC+02:00)	Nestorovski 57'; Hasani 59'	Report	Belotti 24'; Immobile 75', 90+2'	Stadium: Philip II Arena; Attendance: 19,195; Referee: Danny Makkelie (Netherlands)

12 November 2016 2018 FIFA World Cup qualification Group G	Liechtenstein	0–4	Italy	Vaduz, Liechtenstein
20:45 CET (UTC+01:00)		Report	Belotti 11', 44'; Immobile 12'; Candreva 32'	Stadium: Rheinpark Stadion; Attendance: 5,864; Referee: Ivan Bebek (Croatia)

15 November 2016 International friendly	Italy	0–0	Germany	Milan, Italy
20:45 CET (UTC+01:00)		Report		Stadium: San Siro; Attendance: 48,600; Referee: Artur Soares Dias (Portugal)

=== 2017 ===
24 March 2017 2018 FIFA World Cup qualification Group G	Italy	2–0	Albania	Palermo, Italy
20:45 CET (UTC+01:00)	De Rossi 12' (pen.); Immobile 71'	Report		Stadium: Stadio Renzo Barbera; Attendance: 33,136; Referee: Slavko Vinčić (Slovenia)

28 March 2017 International friendly	Netherlands	1–2	Italy	Amsterdam, Netherlands
20:45 CEST (UTC+02:00)	Romagnoli 10' (o.g.)	Report	Éder 11'; Bonucci 32'	Stadium: Amsterdam Arena; Attendance: 46,228; Referee: Jonas Eriksson (Sweden)

7 June 2017 International friendly	Italy	3–0	Uruguay	Nice, France
21:00 CEST (UTC+02:00)	Giménez 7' (o.g.); Éder 82'; De Rossi 90+3' (pen.)	Report		Stadium: Allianz Riviera; Attendance: 17,000; Referee: Clément Turpin (France)

11 June 2017 2018 FIFA World Cup qualification Group G	Italy	5–0	Liechtenstein	Udine, Italy
20:45 CEST (UTC+02:00)	Insigne 35'; Belotti 52'; Éder 75'; Bernardeschi 83'; Gabbiadini 90+1'	Report		Stadium: Stadio Friuli; Attendance: 20,514; Referee: Kevin Clancy (Scotland)

2 September 2017 2018 FIFA World Cup qualification Group G	Spain	3–0	Italy	Madrid, Spain
20:45 CEST (UTC+02:00)	Isco 13', 40'; Morata 77'	Report		Stadium: Santiago Bernabéu Stadium; Attendance: 73,628; Referee: Björn Kuipers (Netherlands)

5 September 2017 2018 FIFA World Cup qualification Group G	Italy	1–0	Israel	Reggio Emilia, Italy
20:45 CEST (UTC+02:00)	Immobile 53'	Report		Stadium: Mapei Stadium – Città del Tricolore; Attendance: 15,507; Referee: Benoît Bastien (France)

6 October 2017 2018 FIFA World Cup qualification Group G	Italy	1–1	Macedonia	Turin, Italy
20:45 CEST (UTC+02:00)	Chiellini 40'	Report	Trajkovski 77'	Stadium: Stadio Olimpico Grande Torino; Attendance: 22,603; Referee: Tiago Martins (Portugal)

9 October 2017 2018 FIFA World Cup qualification Group G	Albania	0–1	Italy	Shkodër, Albania
20:45 CEST (UTC+02:00)		Report	Candreva 73'	Stadium: Loro Boriçi Stadium; Attendance: 14,718; Referee: Svein Oddvar Moen (Norway)

10 November 2017 2018 FIFA World Cup qualification Second round	Sweden	1–0	Italy	Solna, Sweden
20:45 CET (UTC+01:00)	Johansson 61'	Report		Stadium: Friends Arena; Attendance: 49,193; Referee: Cüneyt Çakır (Turkey)

13 November 2017 2018 FIFA World Cup qualification Second round	Italy	0–0 (0–1 agg.)	Sweden	Milan, Italy
20:45 CET (UTC+01:00)		Report		Stadium: San Siro; Attendance: 72,696; Referee: Antonio Mateu Lahoz (Spain)

=== 2018 ===
23 March 2018^{1} International friendly	Argentina	2–0	Italy	Manchester, England
19:45 GMT (UTC±00:00)	Banega 75'; Lanzini 85'	Report		Stadium: Etihad Stadium; Attendance: 25,000; Referee: Martin Atkinson (England)

27 March 2018 International friendly	England	1–1	Italy	London, England
20:00 BST (UTC+01:00)	Vardy 26'	Report	Insigne 87' (pen.)	Stadium: Wembley Stadium; Attendance: 82,598; Referee: Deniz Aytekin (Germany)

28 May 2018^{1} International friendly	Italy	2–1	Saudi Arabia	St. Gallen, Switzerland
20:45 CEST (UTC+02:00)	Balotelli 21'; Belotti 69'	Report	Al-Shehri 72'	Stadium: kybunpark Attendance: 10,100; Referee: Sandro Schärer (Switzerland)

1 June 2018 International friendly	France	3–1	Italy	Nice, France
21:00 CEST (UTC+02:00)	Umtiti 8'; Griezmann 29' (pen.); Dembélé 63'	Report	Bonucci 36'	Stadium: Allianz Riviera; Attendance: 35,006; Referee: Anthony Taylor (England)

4 June 2018 International friendly	Italy	1–1	Netherlands	Turin, Italy
20:45 CEST (UTC+02:00)	Zaza 67'	Report	Aké 88'	Stadium: Allianz Stadium; Attendance: 20,500; Referee: Vladislav Bezborodov (Russia)

7 September 2018 2018–19 UEFA Nations League; Group A3	Italy	1–1	Poland	Bologna, Italy
20:45 CEST (UTC+02:00)	Jorginho 78' (pen.)	Report	Zieliński 40'	Stadium: Stadio Renato Dall'Ara; Attendance: 24,000; Referee: Felix Zwayer (Germany)

10 September 2018 2018–19 UEFA Nations League; Group A3	Portugal	1–0	Italy	Lisbon, Portugal
20:45 CEST (UTC+02:00)	A. Silva 48'	Report		Stadium: Estádio José Alvalade; Attendance: 52,635; Referee: Willie Collum (Scotland)

10 October 2018 International friendly	Italy	1–1	Ukraine	Genoa, Italy
20:45 CEST (UTC+02:00)	Bernardeschi 55'	Report	Malinovskyi 62'	Stadium: Stadio Luigi Ferraris; Attendance: 12,000; Referee: Rade Obrenović (Slovenia)

14 October 2018 2018–19 UEFA Nations League; Group A3	Poland	0–1	Italy	Chorzów, Poland
20:45 CEST (UTC+02:00)		Report	Biraghi 90+2'	Stadium: Stadion Śląski; Attendance: 41,692; Referee: Damir Skomina (Slovenia)

17 November 2018 2018–19 UEFA Nations League; Group A3	Italy	0–0	Portugal	Milan, Italy
20:45 CET (UTC+01:00)		Report		Stadium: San Siro; Attendance: 73,000; Referee: Danny Makkelie (Netherlands)

20 November 2018 International friendly	Italy	1–0	United States	Genk, Belgium
20:45 CET (UTC+01:00)	Politano 90+4'	Report		Stadium: Luminus Arena; Attendance: 13,500; Referee: Cüneyt Çakır (Turkey)

=== 2019 ===
23 March 2019 UEFA Euro 2020 qualifying Group J	Italy	2–0	Finland	Udine, Italy
20:45 CET (UTC+01:00)	Barella 7'; Kean 74'	Report		Stadium: Stadio Friuli; Attendance: 24,000; Referee: Orel Grinfeld (Israel)

26 March 2019 UEFA Euro 2020 qualifying Group J	Italy	6–0	Liechtenstein	Parma, Italy
20:45 CET (UTC+01:00)	Sensi 17'; Verratti 32'; Quagliarella 35' (pen.), 45+3' (pen.); Kean 69'; Pavoletti 76'	Report		Stadium: Stadio Ennio Tardini; Attendance: 19,834; Referee: Kirill Levnikov (Russia)

8 June 2019 UEFA Euro 2020 qualifying Group J	Greece	0–3	Italy	Athens, Greece
20:45 CEST (UTC+02:00)		Report	Barella 23'; Insigne 30'; Bonucci 33'	Stadium: Olympic Stadium; Attendance: 19,828; Referee: Anthony Taylor (England)

11 June 2019 UEFA Euro 2020 qualifying Group J	Italy	2–1	Bosnia and Herzegovina	Turin, Italy
20:45 CEST (UTC+02:00)	Insigne 49'; Verratti 86'	Report	Džeko 32'	Stadium: Juventus Stadium; Attendance: 29,100; Referee: Xavier Estrada Fernández (Spain)

5 September 2019 UEFA Euro 2020 qualifying Group J	Armenia	1–3	Italy	Yerevan, Armenia
18:00 CEST (UTC+02:00)	Karapetian 11'	Report	Belotti 28'; Lo. Pellegrini 77'; Ayrapetyan 80' (o.g.)	Stadium: Vazgen Sargsyan Republican Stadium; Attendance: 13,680; Referee: Daniel Siebert (Germany)

8 September 2019 UEFA Euro 2020 qualifying Group J	Finland	1–2	Italy	Tampere, Finland
20:45 CEST (UTC+02:00)	Pukki 72' (pen.)	Report	Immobile 59'; Jorginho 79' (pen.)	Stadium: Tampere Stadium; Attendance: 16,292; Referee: Bobby Madden (Scotland)

12 October 2019 UEFA Euro 2020 qualifying Group J	Italy	2–0	Greece	Rome, Italy
20:45 CEST (UTC+02:00)	Jorginho 63' (pen.); Bernardeschi 78'	Report		Stadium: Stadio Olimpico; Attendance: 56,274; Referee: Sergei Karasev (Russia)

15 October 2019 UEFA Euro 2020 qualifying Group J	Liechtenstein	0–5	Italy	Vaduz, Liechtenstein
20:45 CEST (UTC+02:00)		Report	Bernardeschi 2'; Belotti 70', 90+2'; Romagnoli 77'; El Shaarawy 82'	Stadium: Rheinpark Stadion; Attendance: 5,087; Referee: Andris Treimanis (Latvia)

15 November 2019 UEFA Euro 2020 qualifying Group J	Bosnia and Herzegovina	0–3	Italy	Zenica, Bosnia and Herzegovina
20:45 CET (UTC+01:00)		Report	Acerbi 21'; Insigne 37'; Belotti 52'	Stadium: Bilino Polje Stadium; Attendance: 8,355; Referee: Sandro Schärer (Switzerland)

18 November 2019 UEFA Euro 2020 qualifying Group J	Italy	9–1	Armenia	Palermo, Italy
20:45 CET (UTC+01:00)	Immobile 8', 33'; Zaniolo 9', 64'; Barella 29'; Romagnoli 72'; Jorginho 75' (pen.); Orsolini 78'; Chiesa 81'	Report	Babayan 79'	Stadium: Stadio Renzo Barbera; Attendance: 27,752; Referee: Tiago Martins (Portugal)

=== 2020 ===
4 September 2020 2020–21 UEFA Nations League; Group A1	Italy	1–1	Bosnia and Herzegovina	Florence, Italy
20:45 CEST (UTC+02:00)	Sensi 67'	Report	Džeko 57'	Stadium: Stadio Artemio Franchi; Attendance: 0 (Note: Due to the COVID-19 pandemic in Europe, all matches scheduled for September 2020 were played behind closed doors.); Referee: Anastasios Sidiropoulos (Greece)

7 September 2020 2020–21 UEFA Nations League; Group A1	Netherlands	0–1	Italy	Amsterdam, Netherlands
20:45 CEST (UTC+02:00)		Report	Barella 45+1'	Stadium: Johan Cruyff Arena; Attendance: 0 Referee: Felix Brych (Germany)

7 October 2020 International friendly	Italy	6–0	Moldova	Florence, Italy
20:45 CEST (UTC+02:00)	Cristante 19'; Caputo 23'; El Shaarawy 30', 45+1'; Posmac 38' (o.g.); Berardi 72'	Report		Stadium: Stadio Artemio Franchi; Attendance: 0 (Note: Due to the COVID-19 pandemic in Europe, the match was played behind closed doors.); Referee: Daniel Siebert (Germany)

11 October 2020 2020–21 UEFA Nations League; Group A1	Poland	0–0	Italy	Gdańsk, Poland
20:45 CEST (UTC+02:00)		Report		Stadium: Stadion Energa Gdańsk; Attendance: 9,200; Referee: José María Sánchez Martínez (Spain)

14 October 2020 2020–21 UEFA Nations League; Group A1	Italy	1–1	Netherlands	Bergamo, Italy
20:45 CEST (UTC+02:00)	Pellegrini 16'	Report	Van de Beek 25'	Stadium: Stadio Atleti Azzurri d'Italia; Attendance: 623; Referee: Anthony Taylor (England)

11 November 2020 International friendly	Italy	4–0	Estonia	Florence, Italy
20:45 CET (UTC+01:00)	Grifo 14', 75' (pen.); Bernardeschi 27'; Orsolini 86' (pen.)	Report		Stadium: Stadio Artemio Franchi; Attendance: 0 Referee: Rade Obrenovič (Slovenia)

15 November 2020 2020–21 UEFA Nations League; Group A1	Italy	2–0	Poland	Reggio Emilia, Italy
20:45 CET (UTC+01:00)	Jorginho 27' (pen.); Berardi 84'	Report		Stadium: Stadio Città del Tricolore; Attendance: 0 Referee: Clément Turpin (France)

18 November 2020 2020–21 UEFA Nations League; Group A1	Bosnia and Herzegovina	0–2	Italy	Sarajevo, Bosnia and Herzegovina
20:45 CET (UTC+01:00)		Report	Belotti 22'; Berardi 68'	Stadium: Stadion Grbavica; Attendance: 0 Referee: Artur Soares Dias (Portugal)

=== 2021 ===
25 March 2021 2022 FIFA World Cup qualification Group C	Italy	2–0	Northern Ireland	Parma, Italy
20:45 CET (UTC+01:00)	Berardi 14'; Immobile 39'	Report		Stadium: Stadio Ennio Tardini; Attendance: 0 Referee: Ali Palabıyık (Turkey)

28 March 2021 2022 FIFA World Cup qualification Group C	Bulgaria	0–2	Italy	Sofia, Bulgaria
20:45 CEST (UTC+02:00)		Report	Belotti 43' (pen.); Locatelli 83'	Stadium: Vasil Levski National Stadium; Attendance: 0 Referee: Slavko Vinčić (Slovenia)

31 March 2021 2022 FIFA World Cup qualification Group C	Lithuania	0–2	Italy	Vilnius, Lithuania
20:45 CEST (UTC+02:00)		Report	Sensi 48'; Immobile 90+4' (pen.)	Stadium: LFF Stadium; Attendance: 0 Referee: Paweł Raczkowski (Poland)

28 May 2021 International friendly	Italy	7–0	San Marino	Cagliari, Italy
20:45 CEST (UTC+02:00)	Bernardeschi 32'; Ferrari 34'; Politano 49', 77'; Belotti 67'; Pessina 75', 87'	Report		Stadium: Sardegna Arena; Attendance: 0 Referee: Trustin Farrugia Cann (Malta)

4 June 2021 International friendly	Italy	4–0	Czech Republic	Bologna, Italy
20:45 CEST (UTC+02:00)	Immobile 23'; Barella 42'; Insigne 66'; Berardi 73'	Report		Stadium: Stadio Renato Dall'Ara; Attendance: 0 Referee: Lionel Tschudi (Switzerland)

11 June 2021 UEFA Euro 2020; Group A	Turkey	0–3	Italy	Rome, Italy
21:00 CEST (UTC+02:00)		Report	Demiral 53' (o.g.); Immobile 66'; Insigne 79'	Stadium: Stadio Olimpico; Attendance: 12,916; Referee: Danny Makkelie (Netherlands)

16 June 2021 UEFA Euro 2020; Group A	Italy	3–0	Switzerland	Rome, Italy
21:00 CEST (UTC+02:00)	Locatelli 26', 52'; Immobile 89'	Report		Stadium: Stadio Olimpico; Attendance: 12,445; Referee: Sergei Karasev (Russia)

20 June 2021 UEFA Euro 2020; Group A	Italy	1–0	Wales	Rome, Italy
18:00 CEST (UTC+02:00)	Pessina 39'	Report		Stadium: Stadio Olimpico; Attendance: 11,541; Referee: Ovidiu Hațegan (Romania)

26 June 2021 UEFA Euro 2020; Round of 16	Italy	2–1 (a.e.t.)	Austria	London, England
21:00 CEST (UTC+01:00)	Chiesa 95'; Pessina 105'	Report	Kalajdžić 114'	Stadium: Wembley Stadium; Attendance: 18,910; Referee: Anthony Taylor (England)

2 July 2021 UEFA Euro 2020; Quarter-final	Belgium	1–2	Italy	Munich, Germany
21:00 CEST (UTC+02:00)	Lukaku 45+2' (pen.)	Report	Barella 31'; Insigne 44'	Stadium: Allianz Arena; Attendance: 12,984; Referee: Slavko Vinčić (Slovenia)

6 July 2021 UEFA Euro 2020; Semi-final	Italy	1–1 (a.e.t.) (4–2 p)	Spain	London, England
21:00 CEST (UTC+01:00)	Chiesa 60'	Report	Morata 80'	Stadium: Wembley Stadium; Attendance: 57,811; Referee: Felix Brych (Germany)
	Penalties
	Locatelli (penalty missed); Belotti (penalty scored); Bonucci (penalty scored); Bernardeschi (penalty scored); Jorginho (penalty scored)		(penalty missed) Olmo; (penalty scored) Gerard; (penalty scored) Thiago; (penalty missed) Morata

11 July 2021 UEFA Euro 2020; Final	Italy	1–1 (a.e.t.) (3–2 p)	England	London, England
21:00 CEST (UTC+01:00)	Bonucci 67'	Report	Shaw 2'	Stadium: Wembley Stadium; Attendance: 67,173; Referee: Björn Kuipers (Netherlands)
	Penalties
	Berardi (penalty scored); Belotti (penalty missed); Bonucci (penalty scored); Bernardeschi (penalty scored); Jorginho (penalty missed)		(penalty scored) Kane; (penalty scored) Maguire; (penalty missed) Rashford; (penalty missed) Sancho; (penalty missed) Saka

2 September 2021 2022 FIFA World Cup qualification Group C	Italy	1–1	Bulgaria	Florence, Italy
20:45 CEST (UTC+02:00)	Chiesa 16'	Report	Iliev 40'	Stadium: Stadio Artemio Franchi; Attendance: 14,366; Referee: Serdar Gözübüyük (Netherlands)

5 September 2021 2022 FIFA World Cup qualification Group C	Switzerland	0–0	Italy	Basel, Switzerland
20:45 CEST (UTC+02:00)		Report		Stadium: St. Jakob-Park; Attendance: 31,500; Referee: Carlos del Cerro Grande (Spain)

8 September 2021 2022 FIFA World Cup qualification Group C	Italy	5–0	Lithuania	Reggio Emilia, Italy
20:45 CEST (UTC+02:00)	Kean 11', 29'; Utkus 14' (o.g.); Raspadori 24'; Di Lorenzo 54'	Report		Stadium: Stadio Città del Tricolore; Attendance: 10,578; Referee: Craig Pawson (England)

6 October 2021 2021 UEFA Nations League Finals; Semi-final	Italy	1–2	Spain	Milan, Italy
20:45 CEST (UTC+02:00)	Pellegrini 83'	Report	F. Torres 17', 45+2'	Stadium: San Siro; Attendance: 33,524; Referee: Sergei Karasev (Russia)

10 October 2021 2021 UEFA Nations League Finals; Third place play-off	Italy	2–1	Belgium	Turin, Italy
15:00 CEST (UTC+02:00)	Barella 46'; Berardi 65' (pen.)	Report	De Ketelaere 86'	Stadium: Juventus Stadium; Attendance: 16,724; Referee: Srđan Jovanović (Serbia)

12 November 2021 2022 FIFA World Cup qualification Group C	Italy	1–1	Switzerland	Rome, Italy
20:45 CET (UTC+01:00)	Di Lorenzo 36'	Report	Widmer 11'	Stadium: Stadio Olimpico; Attendance: 45,699; Referee: Anthony Taylor (England)

15 November 2021 2022 FIFA World Cup qualification Group C	Northern Ireland	0–0	Italy	Belfast, Northern Ireland
20:45 CET (UTC+01:00)		Report		Stadium: Windsor Park; Attendance: 15,969; Referee: István Kovács (Romania)

=== 2022 ===
24 March 2022 2022 FIFA World Cup qualification Second round	Italy	0–1	North Macedonia	Palermo, Italy
20:45 CET (UTC+01:00)		Report	Trajkovski 90+2'	Stadium: Stadio Renzo Barbera; Attendance: 34,129; Referee: Clément Turpin (France)

29 March 2022 International friendly	Turkey	2–3	Italy	Konya, Turkey
20:45 CEST (UTC+02:00)	Ünder 4'; Dursun 83'	Report	Cristante 35'; Raspadori 39', 70'	Stadium: Konya Metropolitan Municipality Stadium; Attendance: 40,000; Referee: Enea Jorgji (Albania)

1 June 2022 2022 Finalissima	Italy	0–3	Argentina	London, England
20:45 CEST (UTC+02:00)		Report	La. Martínez 28'; Di María 45+1'; Dybala 90+4'	Stadium: Wembley Stadium; Attendance: 87,112; Referee: Piero Maza (Chile)

4 June 2022 2022–23 UEFA Nations League; Group A3	Italy	1–1	Germany	Bologna, Italy
20:45 CEST (UTC+02:00)	Pellegrini 70'	Report	Kimmich 73'	Stadium: Stadio Renato Dall'Ara; Attendance: 23,754; Referee: Srđan Jovanović (Serbia)

7 June 2022 2022–23 UEFA Nations League; Group A3	Italy	2–1	Hungary	Cesena, Italy
20:45 CEST (UTC+02:00)	Barella 30'; Pellegrini 45'	Report	Mancini 61' (o.g.)	Stadium: Stadio Dino Manuzzi; Attendance: 14,942; Referee: Sandro Schärer (Switzerland)

11 June 2022 2022–23 UEFA Nations League; Group A3	England	0–0	Italy	Wolverhampton, England
20:45 CEST (UTC+02:00)		Report		Stadium: Molineux Stadium; Attendance: 1,782 (Note: The Football Association were ordered to play behind closed doors due to sanctions by UEFA. They were permitted to distribute tickets to under-14s, with one adult supervising every ten children.); Referee: Szymon Marciniak (Poland)

14 June 2022 2022–23 UEFA Nations League; Group A3	Germany	5–2	Italy	Mönchengladbach, Germany
20:45 CEST (UTC+02:00)	Kimmich 10'; Gündoğan 45+4' (pen.); Müller 51'; Werner 68', 69'	Report	Gnonto 78'; Bastoni 90+4'	Stadium: Borussia-Park; Attendance: 44,144; Referee: István Kovács (Romania)

23 September 2022 2022–23 UEFA Nations League; Group A3	Italy	1–0	England	Milan, Italy
20:45 CEST (UTC+02:00)	Raspadori 68'	Report		Stadium: San Siro; Attendance: 50,640; Referee: Jesús Gil Manzano (Spain)

26 September 2022 2022–23 UEFA Nations League; Group A3	Hungary	0–2	Italy	Budapest, Hungary
20:45 CEST (UTC+02:00)		Report	Raspadori 27'; Dimarco 52'	Stadium: Puskás Aréna; Attendance: 57,300; Referee: Benoît Bastien (France)

16 November 2022 International friendly	Albania	1–3	Italy	Tirana, Albania
20:45 CET (UTC+01:00)	Ismajli 16'	Report	Di Lorenzo 20'; Grifo 25', 64'	Stadium: Arena Kombëtare; Attendance: 22,000; Referee: Genc Nuza (Kosovo)

20 November 2022 International friendly	Austria	2–0	Italy	Vienna, Austria
20:45 CET (UTC+01:00)	Schlager 6'; Alaba 35'	Report		Stadium: Ernst-Happel-Stadion; Attendance: 18,000; Referee: Christian Dingert (Germany)

=== 2023 ===
23 March 2023 UEFA Euro 2024 qualifying Group C	Italy	1–2	England	Naples, Italy
20:45 CET (UTC+01:00)	Retegui 56'	Report	Rice 13'; Kane 44' (pen.)	Stadium: Stadio Diego Armando Maradona; Attendance: 44,536; Referee: Srđan Jovanović (Serbia)

26 March 2023 UEFA Euro 2024 qualifying Group C	Malta	0–2	Italy	Ta' Qali, Malta
20:45 CEST (UTC+02:00)		Report	Retegui 15'; Pessina 27'	Stadium: National Stadium; Attendance: 16,015; Referee: Georgi Kabakov (Bulgaria)

15 June 2023 2023 UEFA Nations League Finals; Semi-final	Spain	2–1	Italy	Enschede, Netherlands
20:45 CEST (UTC+02:00)	Pino 3'; Joselu 88'	Report	Immobile 11' (pen.)	Stadium: De Grolsch Veste; Attendance: 24,558; Referee: Slavko Vinčić (Slovenia)

18 June 2023 2023 UEFA Nations League Finals; Third place play-off	Netherlands	2–3	Italy	Enschede, Netherlands
15:00 CEST (UTC+02:00)	Bergwijn 68'; Wijnaldum 89'	Report	Dimarco 6'; Frattesi 20'; Chiesa 72'	Stadium: De Grolsch Veste; Attendance: 21,292; Referee: Glenn Nyberg (Sweden)

9 September 2023^{1} UEFA Euro 2024 qualifying Group C	North Macedonia	1–1	Italy	Skopje, North Macedonia
20:45 CEST (UTC+02:00)	Bardhi 81'	Report	Immobile 47'	Stadium: Toše Proeski Arena; Attendance: 28,126; Referee: François Letexier (France)

12 September 2023 UEFA Euro 2024 qualifying Group C	Italy	2–1	Ukraine	Milan, Italy
20:45 CEST (UTC+02:00)	Frattesi 12', 29'	Report	Yarmolenko 41'	Stadium: San Siro; Attendance: 58,386; Referee: Alejandro Hernández Hernández (Spain)

14 October 2023 UEFA Euro 2024 qualifying Group C	Italy	4–0	Malta	Bari, Italy
20:45 CEST (UTC+02:00)	Bonaventura 23'; Berardi 45+1', 64'; Frattesi 90+3'	Report		Stadium: Stadio San Nicola; Attendance: 56,186; Referee: Duje Strukan (Croatia)

17 October 2023 UEFA Euro 2024 qualifying Group C	England	3–1	Italy	London, England
20:45 CEST (UTC+02:00)	Kane 32' (pen.), 77'; Rashford 57'	Report	Scamacca 15'	Stadium: Wembley Stadium; Attendance: 83,194; Referee: Clément Turpin (France)

17 November 2023 UEFA Euro 2024 qualifying Group C	Italy	5–2	North Macedonia	Rome, Italy
20:45 CET (UTC+01:00)	Darmian 17'; Chiesa 41', 45+2'; Raspadori 81'; El Shaarawy 90+3'	Report	Atanasov 52', 74'	Stadium: Stadio Olimpico; Attendance: 56,364; Referee: Felix Zwayer (Germany)

20 November 2023 UEFA Euro 2024 qualifying Group C	Ukraine	0–0	Italy	Leverkusen, Germany (Note: Due to the Russian invasion of Ukraine, Ukraine were required to play their home matches at neutral venues until further notice.)
20:45 CET (UTC+01:00)		Report		Stadium: BayArena; Attendance: 26,403; Referee: Jesús Gil Manzano (Spain)

=== 2024 ===
21 March 2024 International friendly	Venezuela	1–2	Italy	Fort Lauderdale, United States
17:00 EDT (UTC−04:00)	Machís 43'	Report	Retegui 40', 80'	Stadium: DRV PNK Stadium; Attendance: 15,000; Referee: Rubiel Vazquez (United States)

24 March 2024 International friendly	Ecuador	0–2	Italy	Harrison, United States
16:00 EDT (UTC−04:00)		Report	Pellegrini 3'; Barella 90+4'	Stadium: Red Bull Arena; Attendance: 18,000; Referee: Jon Freemon (United States)

4 June 2024 International friendly	Italy	0–0	Turkey	Bologna, Italy
21:00 CEST (UTC+02:00)		Report		Stadium: Stadio Renato Dall'Ara; Attendance: 25,012; Referee: Sebastian Gishamer (Austria)

9 June 2024 International friendly	Italy	1–0	Bosnia and Herzegovina	Empoli, Italy
20:45 CEST (UTC+02:00)	Frattesi 38'	Report		Stadium: Stadio Carlo Castellani; Attendance: 12,000; Referee: Chrysovalantis Theouli (Cyprus)

15 June 2024 UEFA Euro 2024; Group B	Italy	2–1	Albania	Dortmund, Germany
21:00 CEST (UTC+02:00)	Bastoni 11'; Barella 16'	Report	Bajrami 1'	Stadium: Westfalenstadion; Attendance: 60,512; Referee: Felix Zwayer (Germany)

20 June 2024 UEFA Euro 2024; Group B	Spain	1–0	Italy	Gelsenkirchen, Germany
21:00 CEST (UTC+02:00)	Calafiori 55' (o.g.)	Report		Stadium: Arena AufSchalke; Attendance: 49,528; Referee: Slavko Vinčić (Slovenia)

24 June 2024 UEFA Euro 2024; Group B	Croatia	1–1	Italy	Leipzig, Germany
21:00 CEST (UTC+02:00)	Modrić 55'	Report	Zaccagni 90+8'	Stadium: Red Bull Arena; Attendance: 38,322; Referee: Danny Makkelie (Netherlands)

29 June 2024 UEFA Euro 2024; Round of 16	Switzerland	2–0	Italy	Berlin, Germany
18:00 CEST (UTC+02:00)	Freuler 37'; Vargas 46'	Report		Stadium: Olympiastadion; Attendance: 68,172; Referee: Szymon Marciniak (Poland)

6 September 2024 2024–25 UEFA Nations League; Group A2	France	1–3	Italy	Paris, France
20:45 CEST (UTC+02:00)	Barcola 1'	Report	Dimarco 30'; Frattesi 51'; Raspadori 74'	Stadium: Parc des Princes; Attendance: 44,956; Referee: Sandro Schärer (Switzerland)

9 September 2024 2024–25 UEFA Nations League; Group A2	Israel	1–2	Italy	Budapest, Hungary
20:45 CEST (UTC+02:00)	Abu Fani 90'	Report	Frattesi 38'; Kean 62'	Stadium: Bozsik Aréna (Note: Due to the Gaza war, Israel were required to play their home matches at neutral venues until further notice.); Attendance: 2,090; Referee: Ivan Kružliak (Slovakia)

10 October 2024 2024–25 UEFA Nations League; Group A2	Italy	2–2	Belgium	Rome, Italy
20:45 CEST (UTC+02:00)	Cambiaso 1'; Retegui 24'	Report	De Cuyper 42'; Trossard 61'	Stadium: Stadio Olimpico; Attendance: 44,297; Referee: Espen Eskås (Norway)

14 October 2024 2024–25 UEFA Nations League; Group A2	Italy	4–1	Israel	Udine, Italy
20:45 CEST (UTC+02:00)	Retegui 41' (pen.); Di Lorenzo 54', 79'; Frattesi 72'	Report	Abu Fani 66'	Stadium: Stadio Friuli; Attendance: 11,700; Referee: Ricardo de Burgos Bengoetxea (Spain)

14 November 2024 2024–25 UEFA Nations League; Group A2	Belgium	0–1	Italy	Brussels, Belgium
20:45 CET (UTC+01:00)		Report	Tonali 11'	Stadium: King Baudouin Stadium; Attendance: 41,367; Referee: Radu Petrescu (Romania)

17 November 2024 2024–25 UEFA Nations League; Group A2	Italy	1–3	France	Milan, Italy
20:45 CET (UTC+01:00)	Cambiaso 35'	Report	Rabiot 2', 65'; Vicario 33' (o.g.)	Stadium: San Siro; Attendance: 68,158; Referee: Slavko Vinčić (Slovenia)

=== 2025 ===
20 March 2025 2024–25 UEFA Nations League; Quarter-final	Italy	1–2	Germany	Milan, Italy
20:45 CET (UTC+01:00)	Tonali 9'	Report	Kleindienst 49'; Goretzka 76'	Stadium: San Siro; Attendance: 60,334; Referee: François Letexier (France)

23 March 2025 2024–25 UEFA Nations League; Quarter-final	Germany	3–3 (5–4 agg.)	Italy	Dortmund, Germany
20:45 CET (UTC+01:00)	Kimmich 30' (pen.); Musiala 36'; Kleindiesnt 45'	Report	Kean 49', 69'; Raspadori 90+5' (pen.)	Stadium: Westfalenstadion; Attendance: 64,762; Referee: Szymon Marciniak (Poland)

6 June 2025 2026 FIFA World Cup qualification Group I	Norway	3–0	Italy	Oslo, Norway
20:45 CEST (UTC+02:00)	Sørloth 14'; Nusa 34'; Haaland 42'	Report		Stadium: Ullevaal Stadion; Attendance: 25,796; Referee: José María Sánchez Martínez (Spain)

9 June 2025 2026 FIFA World Cup qualification Group I	Italy	2–0	Moldova	Reggio Emilia, Italy
20:45 CEST (UTC+02:00)	Raspadori 40'; Cambiaso 50'	Report		Stadium: Mapei Stadium – Città del Tricolore; Attendance: 18,771; Referee: Urs Schnyder (Switzerland)

5 September 2025^{1} 2026 FIFA World Cup qualification Group I	Italy	5–0	Estonia	Bergamo, Italy
20:45 CEST (UTC+02:00)	Kean 58'; Retegui 69', 89'; Raspadori 71'; Bastoni 90+2'	Report		Stadium: Stadio Atleti Azzurri d'Italia; Attendance: 22,559; Referee: João Pinheiro (Portugal)

8 September 2025 2026 FIFA World Cup qualification Group I	Israel	4–5	Italy	Debrecen, Hungary
20:45 CEST (UTC+02:00)	Locatelli 16' (o.g.); Do. Peretz 52', 89'; Bastoni 87' (o.g.)	Report	Kean 40', 54'; Politano 58'; Raspadori 81'; Tonali 90+1'	Stadium: Nagyerdei Stadion; Attendance: 2,540; Referee: Slavko Vinčić (Slovenia)

11 October 2025 2026 FIFA World Cup qualification Group I	Estonia	1–3	Italy	Tallinn, Estonia
20:45 CEST (UTC+02:00)	Sappinen 76'	Report	Kean 5'; Retegui 38'; Esposito 74'	Stadium: Lilleküla Stadium; Attendance: 11,913; Referee: Serdar Gözübüyük (Netherlands)

14 October 2025 2026 FIFA World Cup qualification Group I	Italy	3–0	Israel	Udine, Italy
20:45 CEST (UTC+02:00)	Retegui 45+2' (pen.), 74'; Mancini 90+3'	Report		Stadium: Stadio Friuli; Attendance: 9,965; Referee: Clément Turpin (France)

13 November 2025 2026 FIFA World Cup qualification Group I	Moldova	0–2	Italy	Chișinău, Moldova
20:45 CET (UTC+01:00)		Report	Mancini 88'; Esposito 90+3'	Stadium: Zimbru Stadium; Attendance: 9,526; Referee: Mykola Balakin (Ukraine)

16 November 2025 2026 FIFA World Cup qualification Group I	Italy	1–4	Norway	Milan, Italy
20:45 CET (UTC+01:00)	Esposito 11'	Report	Nusa 63'; Haaland 78', 79'; Strand Larsen 90+3'	Stadium: San Siro; Attendance: 69,020; Referee: Alejandro Hernández Hernández (Spain)

=== 2026 ===
26 March 2026 2026 FIFA World Cup qualification Second round	Italy	2–0	Northern Ireland	Bergamo, Italy
20:45 CET (UTC+01:00)	Tonali 56'; Kean 80'	Report		Stadium: Stadio Atleti Azzurri d'Italia; Attendance: 23,439; Referee: Danny Makkelie (Netherlands)

31 March 2026 2026 FIFA World Cup qualification Second round	Bosnia and Herzegovina	1–1 (a.e.t.) (4–1 p)	Italy	Zenica, Bosnia and Herzegovina
20:45 CEST (UTC+02:00)	Tabaković 79'	Report	Kean 15'	Stadium: Stadion Bilino Polje; Attendance: 9,500; Referee: Clément Turpin (France)
	Penalties
	Tahirović (penalty scored); Tabaković (penalty scored); Alajbegović (penalty scored); Bajraktarević (penalty scored)		(penalty missed) Esposito; (penalty scored) Tonali; (penalty missed) Cristante

3 June 2026^{1} International friendly	Luxembourg	0–1	Italy	Luxembourg City, Luxembourg
20:45 CEST (UTC+02:00)		Report	Esposito 49'	Stadium: Stade de Luxembourg; Attendance: 9,214; Referee: Joey Kooij (Netherlands)

7 June 2026 International friendly	Greece	0–1	Italy	Heraklion, Greece
21:00 CEST (UTC+02:00)		Report	Esposito 18'	Stadium: Pankritio Stadium; Attendance: 13,000; Referee: Yigal Frid (Israel)

25 September 2026^{1} 2026–27 UEFA Nations League; Group A1	Italy	0–2	Belgium	Rome, Italy
20:45 CEST (UTC+02:00)		Report	Godts 20'; Lukébakio 69'	Stadium: Stadio Olimpico; Attendance: 47,155; Referee: Daniel Siebert (Germany)

28 September 2026 2026–27 UEFA Nations League; Group A1	Turkey	1–4	Italy	Bursa, Turkey
20:45 CEST (UTC+02:00)	Yılmaz 47'	Report	Bastoni 9'; Frattesi 22'; Kayode 27'; Esposito 50'	Stadium: Centennial Atatürk Stadium; Attendance: 33,891; Referee: Michael Oliver (England)

2 October 2026 2026–27 UEFA Nations League; Group A1	France	1–1	Italy	Saint-Denis, France
20:45 CEST (UTC+02:00)	Olise 55'	Report	Bastoni 68'	Stadium: Stade de France; Attendance: 77,118; Referee: Jesús Gil Manzano (Spain)

5 October 2026 2026–27 UEFA Nations League; Group A1	Italy	3–1	Turkey	Bologna, Italy
20:45 CEST (UTC+02:00)	Scamacca 26'; Calafiori 65'; P. Esposito 87'	Report	Şimşir 61'	Stadium: Stadio Renato Dall'Ara; Attendance: 30,040; Referee: Szymon Marciniak (Poland)

12 November 2026 2026–27 UEFA Nations League; Group A1	Italy	3–1	France	Milan, Italy
20:45 CET (UTC+01:00)	P. Esposito 26', 75' (pen.); Frattesi 63'	Report	Olise 10'	Stadium: San Siro; Attendance: 71,452; Referee: István Kovács (Romania)

15 November 2026 2026–27 UEFA Nations League; Group A1	Belgium	4–1	Italy	Brussels, Belgium
20:45 CET (UTC+01:00)	De Cuyper 15'; Ngoy 22'; Doku 26'; Moreira 80'	Report	Esposito 11'	Stadium: King Baudouin Stadium; Attendance: 41,842; Referee: Espen Eskås (Norway)

^{1}Indicates new coach
