= Giovanni Di Lorenzo =

Italian footballer (born 1993)

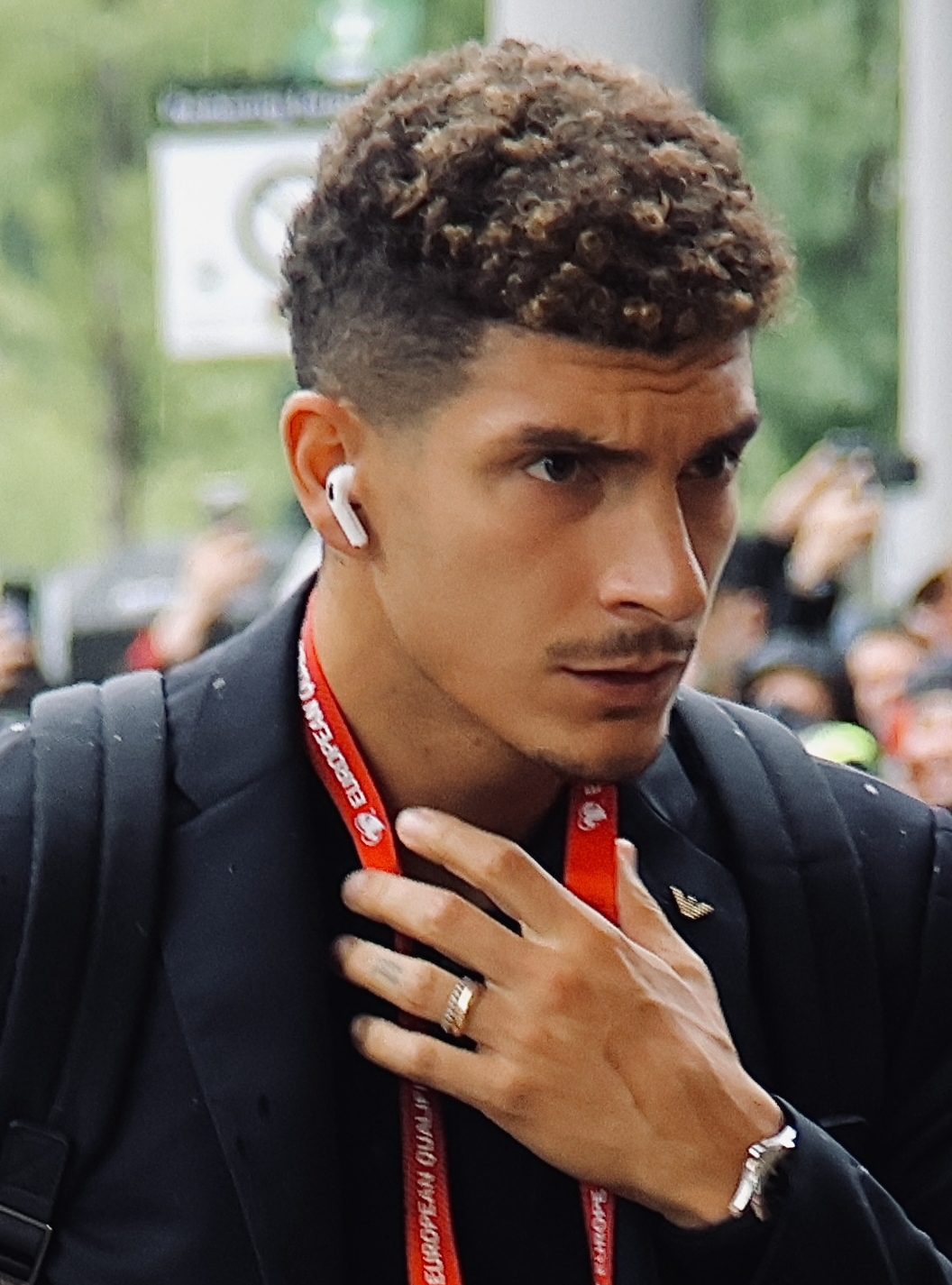
- Di Lorenzo with Italy in 2025

Personal information
- Full name: Giovanni Di Lorenzo
- Date of birth: 4 August 1993 (age 33)
- Place of birth: Castelnuovo di Garfagnana, Italy
- Height: 1.83 m (6 ft 0 in)
- Position: Right-back

Team information
- Current team: Napoli
- Number: 22

Youth career
- 2004–2009: Lucchese
- 2009–2010: Reggina

Senior career*
Years	Team	Apps	(Gls)
2010–2015	Reggina	58	(0)
2012–2013	→ Cuneo (loan)	27	(0)
2015–2017	Matera	58	(3)
2017–2019	Empoli	73	(6)
2019–	Napoli	248	(16)

International career^{‡}
2013	Italy U20	3	(0)
2013	Italy U21	3	(0)
2019–	Italy	56	(5)
Medal record
Men's Football
Representing Italy
UEFA European Championship
Winner	2020 Europe
UEFA Nations League
Third place	2021 Italy
Third place	2023 Netherlands
CONMEBOL–UEFA Cup of Champions
Runner-up	2022 England
- * Club domestic league appearances and goals as of 23:10, 1 November 2026 (UTC) ‡ National team caps and goals as of 6 October 2026

Giovanni Di Lorenzo (born 4 August 1993) is an Italian professional footballer who plays as a right-back for Serie A club Napoli, which he captains, and the Italy national team.

== Club career ==
=== Early career with Reggina and loan to Cuneo ===
Di Lorenzo began his career with the Reggina youth system in 2009. On 29 May 2011, he made his professional debut for the senior side in a Serie B match at Sassuolo. He spent the 2012–13 season on loan with Lega Pro Prima Divisione side Cuneo, collecting 27 appearances and drawing attention due to his promising performances.

=== Matera and Empoli ===
Between 2015 and 2017, Di Lorenzo played for Matera, collecting 58 appearances and scoring 3 goals.

Di Lorenzo was signed by Empoli in August 2017. After helping the side achieve promotion to Serie A, he made his debut in the Italian top flight on 19 August 2018 against Cagliari; in the return fixture against the same opponent, he scored his first Serie A goal.

=== Napoli ===
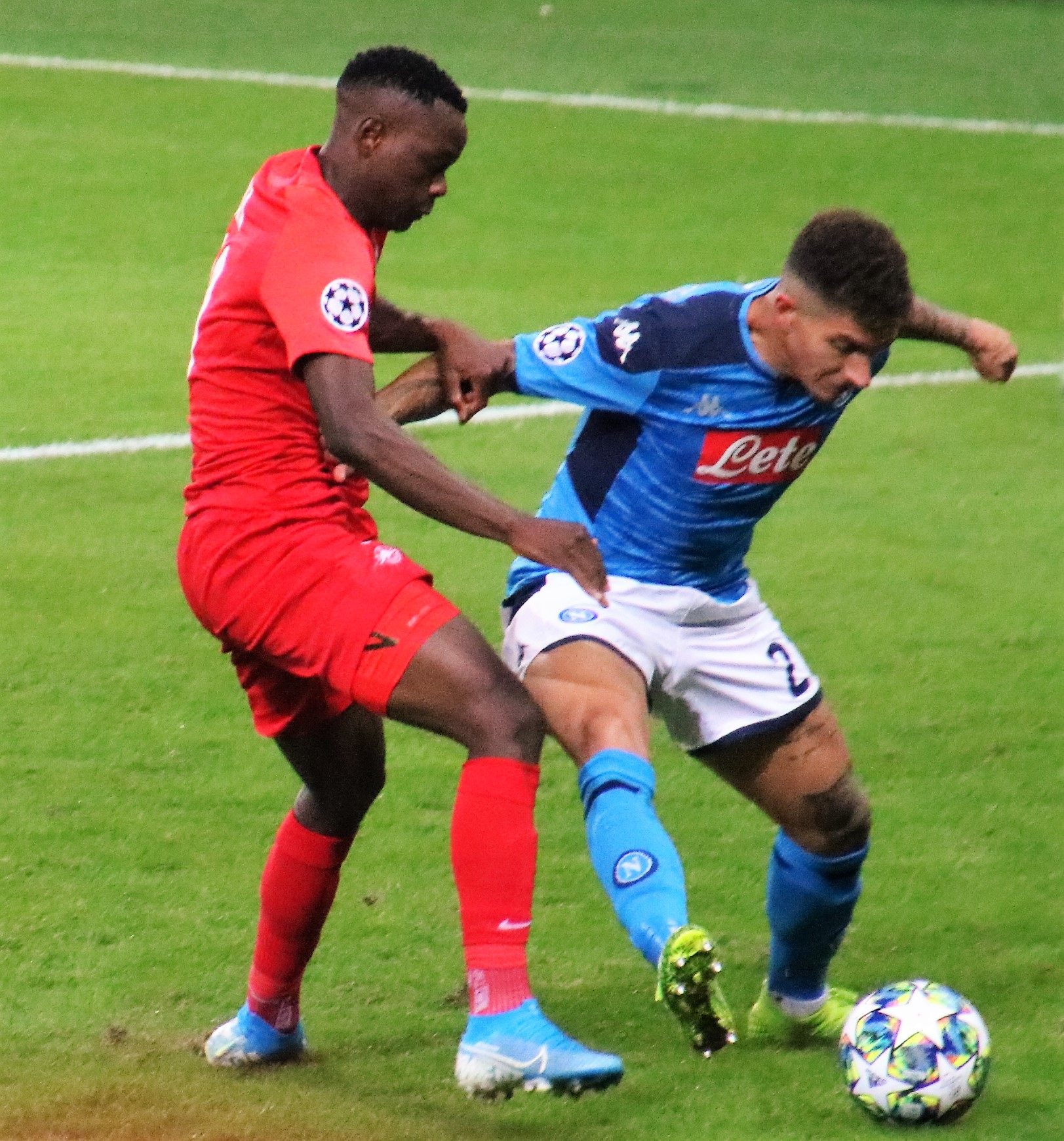
Di Lorenzo (right) playing for Napoli against Red Bull Salzburg at the 2019–20 UEFA Champions League

On 7 June 2019, Di Lorenzo joined Napoli for €8 million. During his first year at Napoli, Di Lorenzo became a first team starter, taking them to seventh in the Serie A and helping them secure a win against Juventus in the Coppa Italia Final. Napoli also reached the Round of 16, in the Champions League, with Di Lorenzo getting 2 assists and playing every game. In his second year at the club, he helped guide the team into the Round of 32, at the Europa League, however, they lost to Granada, 3–2 on aggregate. Napoli also finished fifth in the league. Di Lorenzo has scored 7 goals for Napoli, in the League and Domestic Cups.

On 15 July 2020, the right-back was linked to a move with Manchester United, but instead opted to sign a 5 year deal with Napoli, seeing him remain at the club until 2026.

On 14 July 2022, Di Lorenzo was named the new Napoli club captain following the departures of Lorenzo Insigne and Kalidou Koulibaly. On 4 October, he scored his first Champions League goal in a 6–1 away win over Ajax during the 2022–23 season.

== International career ==
Di Lorenzo has represented Italy at U20 and U21 youth levels.

On 14 August 2013, Di Lorenzo made his debut with the Italy U21 national team under the guidance of coach and former Italian International footballer Luigi Di Biagio in a friendly match against Slovakia which Italy went on to win 4–1.

He made his senior international debut on 15 October 2019, playing as a starter in a 5–0 away win against Liechtenstein, in a UEFA Euro 2020 qualifying match.

In June 2021, he was included in Italy's 26-man squad for UEFA Euro 2020 by manager Roberto Mancini. After beating Belgium on 2 July, Di Lorenzo gained notoriety by celebrating his victory by taking off his shorts and running around in his briefs. On 11 July, Di Lorenzo won the European Championship with Italy following a 3–2 penalty shoot-out victory over England at Wembley Stadium in the final, after a 1–1 draw in extra-time; during the final, Di Lorenzo played the entire match.

On 8 September, Di Lorenzo scored his first goal for the Italy senior national team, the final goal of 5–0 home win over Lithuania in 2022 FIFA World Cup qualifier; he had also contributed to Giacomo Raspadori's first goal for Italy, the third of the match.

== Style of play ==
Initially a forward in his youth, Di Lorenzo was nicknamed "Batigol" by his friends due to his goal-scoring ability, in honour of Argentine striker Gabriel Omar Batistuta. He later switched to playing in more defensive roles and was occasionally deployed as a holding midfielder, before being moved to his current position of right-back. A versatile player, he is also capable of playing as a centre-back, an attack-minded wing-back or a right winger due to his offensive qualities. Although he is not the quickest player, Di Lorenzo is tall, possesses good technique, can play with both feet and is known for his stamina, physical qualities and ability in the air. While he is mainly known for his offensive contribution, he is also a strong defender, and is known for his consistency, which led pundits to rate him as one of the best right-backs in both Serie A and world football in his prime. He has also stood out for his leadership.

== Personal life ==
Di Lorenzo was born in Castelnuovo di Garfagnana to Campanian parents from Bucciano in the province of Benevento. On 25 May 2022, he married the Italian Clarissa Franchi in the church of Segromigno in Monte, in the province of Lucca. The couple have two daughters: Azzurra and Carolina.

== Career statistics ==
=== Club ===
As of match played 1 November 2026

Appearances and goals by club, season and competition
Club	Season	League			Coppa Italia		Europe		Other		Total	
Club	Season	Division	Apps	Goals	Apps	Goals	Apps	Goals	Apps	Goals	Apps	Goals
Reggina	2010–11	Serie B	1	0	—		—		—		1	0
Reggina	2011–12	Serie B	1	0	—		—		—		1	0
Reggina	2013–14	Serie B	20	0	—		—		—		20	0
Reggina	2014–15	Lega Pro	36	0	2	0	—		2	0	40	0
Reggina	Total		58	0	2	0	—		2	0	62	0
Cuneo (loan)	2012–13	Lega Pro	27	0	—		—		1	0	28	0
Matera	2015–16	Lega Pro	33	2	1	0	—		—		34	2
Matera	2016–17	Lega Pro	24	1	7	0	—		2	1	33	2
Matera	2017–18	Lega Pro	1	0	2	0	—		—		3	0
Matera	Total		58	3	10	0	—		2	1	70	4
Empoli	2017–18	Serie B	36	1	0	0	—		—		36	1
Empoli	2018–19	Serie A	37	5	1	0	—		—		38	5
Empoli	Total		73	6	1	0	—		—		74	6
Napoli	2019–20	Serie A	33	3	5	0	8 (Note: Appearances in UEFA Champions League)	0	—		46	3
Napoli	2020–21	Serie A	36	3	4	1	8 (Note: Appearances in UEFA Europa League)	0	1 (Note: Appearance(s) in Supercoppa Italiana)	0	49	4
Napoli	2021–22	Serie A	33	1	1	0	8	0	—		42	1
Napoli	2022–23	Serie A	37	3	0	0	10	2	—		47	5
Napoli	2023–24	Serie A	36	1	1	0	8	1	2	0	47	2
Napoli	2024–25	Serie A	37	3	2	0	—		—		39	3
Napoli	2025–26	Serie A	26	2	0	0	7	0	2	0	35	2
Napoli	2026–27	Serie A	10	0	0	0	3	0	—		13	0
Napoli	Total		248	16	13	1	52	3	5	0	318	20
Career total			470	26	26	1	52	3	10	1	553	30

=== International ===
As of match played 5 October 2026

Appearances and goals by national team and year
National team	Year	Apps	Goals
Italy	2019	2	0
Italy	2020	3	0
Italy	2021	14	2
Italy	2022	6	1
Italy	2023	7	0
Italy	2024	12	2
Italy	2025	9	0
Italy	2026	3	0
Total		56	5

Scores and results list Italy's goal tally first, score column indicates score after each Di Lorenzo goal.

List of international goals scored by Giovanni Di Lorenzo
No.	Date	Venue	Cap	Opponent	Score	Result	Competition
1	8 September 2021	Mapei Stadium – Città del Tricolore, Reggio Emilia, Italy	15	Lithuania	5–0	5–0	2022 FIFA World Cup qualification
2	12 November 2021	Stadio Olimpico, Rome, Italy	18	Switzerland	1–1	1–1	2022 FIFA World Cup qualification
3	16 November 2022	Arena Kombëtare, Tirana, Albania	24	Albania	1–1	3–1	Friendly
4	14 October 2024	Stadio Friuli, Udine, Italy	42	Israel	2–0	4–1	2024–25 UEFA Nations League A
5	14 October 2024	Stadio Friuli, Udine, Italy	42	Israel	4–1	4–1	2024–25 UEFA Nations League A

== Honours ==
Empoli

- Serie B: 2017–18

Napoli

- Serie A: 2022–23, 2024–25
- Coppa Italia: 2019–20
- Supercoppa Italiana: 2025–26

Italy

- UEFA European Championship: 2020
- UEFA Nations League third place: 2020–21, 2022–23

Individual

- Serie A Team of the Year: 2021–22, 2022–23
- Serie A Team of the Season: 2022–23, 2024–25
- ESM Team of the Year: 2022–23

=== Orders ===
- 5th Class / Knight: Cavaliere Ordine al Merito della Repubblica Italiana: 2021
