= 2023 Supercoppa Italiana =

Tournament details
- Host country: Saudi Arabia
- Dates: 18–22 January 2024
- Teams: 4
- Venue: 1 (in 1 host city)

Final positions
- Champions: Inter Milan (8th title)
- Runners-up: Napoli

Tournament statistics
- Matches played: 3
- Goals scored: 7 (2.33 per match)
- Attendance: 55,429 (18,476 per match)
- Top scorer(s): Alessio Zerbin (2 goals)

The 2023 Supercoppa Italiana (branded as the EA SPORTS FC Supercup for sponsorship reasons) was the 36th edition of the Supercoppa Italiana. It was the first edition to feature four teams, an expansion from the previous format of a one-off match between two clubs.

2022–23 Coppa Italia winners Inter Milan defeated 2022–23 Serie A champions Napoli 1–0 in the final, securing a third consecutive and eighth overall Supercoppa Italiana title.

== Qualification ==
The tournament featured the winners and runners-up of the 2022–23 Serie A and 2022–23 Coppa Italia.

=== Qualified teams ===
The following four teams qualified for the tournament.

Team	Method of qualification	Appearance	Last appearance as	Previous performance	
Team	Method of qualification	Appearance	Last appearance as	Winner(s)	Runners-up
Napoli	2022–23 Serie A champions	5th	2020 runners-up	2	2
Inter Milan	2022–23 Coppa Italia winners	12th	2022 winners	7	4
Lazio	2022–23 Serie A runners-up	9th	2019 winners	5	3
Fiorentina	2022–23 Coppa Italia runners-up	3rd	2001 runners-up	1	1

== Format ==
The competition featured two semi-finals to determine the two teams to play in the final. All three matches were played in a single-leg fixture. Matches consisted of two periods of 45 minutes each. In the case of a tie, the matches were decided by a penalty shoot-out.

== Venue ==
All three matches were held at the King Saud University Stadium in Riyadh, Saudi Arabia.

Location of the host city of the 2023 Supercoppa Italiana.	City	Stadium
Location of the host city of the 2023 Supercoppa Italiana.	Riyadh	King Saud University Stadium
Location of the host city of the 2023 Supercoppa Italiana.	Capacity: 25,000	

== Matches ==
- Times listed are SAST (UTC+3).

=== Bracket ===
Semi-finals
18 January 2024 – Riyadh
Napoli	3
Fiorentina	0
19 January 2024 – Riyadh
Inter Milan	3
Lazio	0

Final
22 January 2024 – Riyadh
Napoli	0
Inter Milan	1

=== Semi-finals ===
18 January 2024
22:00

Napoli	3–0	Fiorentina
Simeone 22'; Zerbin 84', 86'	Report

King Saud University Stadium, Riyadh
Attendance: 9,762
Referee: Federico La Penna

19 January 2024
22:00

Inter Milan	3–0	Lazio
Thuram 17'; Çalhanoğlu 50' (pen.); Frattesi 87'	Report

King Saud University Stadium, Riyadh
Attendance: 20,767
Referee: Matteo Marchetti

=== Final ===
22 January 2024
22:00

Napoli	0–1	Inter Milan
	Report	Martínez 90+1'

King Saud University Stadium, Riyadh
Attendance: 24,900
Referee: Antonio Rapuano

== See also ==
- 2023–24 Serie A
- 2023–24 Coppa Italia
