= Hubert Idasiak =

Polish footballer (born 2002)

Personal information
- Full name: Hubert Dawid Idasiak
- Date of birth: 3 February 2002 (age 24)
- Place of birth: Sławno, Poland
- Height: 1.88 m (6 ft 2 in)
- Position: Goalkeeper

Team information
- Current team: Elana Toruń

Youth career
- –2013: Orlik Darłowo
- 2013–2015: Zryw Kretomino
- 2015–2016: Darłovia Darłowo
- 2016–2018: Pogoń Szczecin
- 2018–2022: Napoli

Senior career*
Years	Team	Apps	(Gls)
2022–2024	Napoli	0	(0)
2024–2026	ŁKS Łódź	0	(0)
2024–2026	ŁKS Łódź II	29	(0)
2026	→ KKS 1925 Kalisz (loan)	3	(0)
2026–	Elana Toruń	0	(0)

International career
2017–2018	Poland U16	4	(0)
2019	Poland U17	3	(0)
- * Club domestic league appearances and goals as of 09:32, 31 May 2026 (UTC)

Hubert Dawid Idasiak (born 3 February 2002) is a Polish professional footballer who plays as a goalkeeper for III liga club Elana Toruń.

== Career ==
Born in Sławno, West Pomeranian Voivodeship, Poland, Idasiak began his youth career at Orlik Darłowo. He later played for Zryw Kretomino and Darłovia Darłowo, and eventually joined Pogoń Szczecin's youth system in 2016. In 2018, he joined Napoli, where he played for the Primavera team and featured in three matches in the UEFA Youth League during the 2019–20 season.

On 5 July 2020, he was included on the bench for Napoli's first team by manager Gennaro Gattuso for a league match against Roma, which Napoli won 2–1. He was selected by Luciano Spalletti as Napoli's third-choice goalkeeper for the squad list in the 2021–22 UEFA Europa League.

Idasiak was part of Napoli's squad that won the Serie A title in the 2022–23 season, although he did not make an appearance.

In July 2024, he returned to Poland and joined ŁKS Łódź.

On 14 September 2026, Idasiak signed with Elana Toruń in the fourth division.
