= Giacomo Raspadori =

Italian footballer (born 2000)

Giacomo Raspadori Cavaliere OMRI
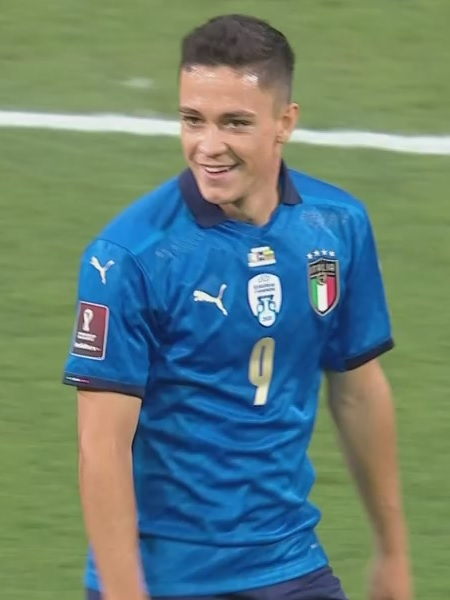
- Raspadori with Italy in 2021

Personal information
- Full name: Giacomo Raspadori
- Date of birth: 18 February 2000 (age 26)
- Place of birth: Bentivoglio, Italy
- Height: 1.72 m (5 ft 8 in)
- Position: Forward

Team information
- Current team: Atalanta
- Number: 18

Youth career
- 2006–2009: Progresso
- 2009–2019: Sassuolo

Senior career*
Years	Team	Apps	(Gls)
2019–2023	Sassuolo	76	(18)
2022–2023	→ Napoli (loan)	25	(2)
2023–2025	Napoli	63	(11)
2025–2026	Atlético Madrid	12	(0)
2026–	Atalanta	17	(4)

International career^{‡}
2016–2017	Italy U17	9	(1)
2018–2019	Italy U19	14	(4)
2019	Italy U20	5	(1)
2020–2021	Italy U21	8	(3)
2021–	Italy	47	(11)
Medal record
Representing Italy
UEFA European Championship
Winner	2020 Europe
UEFA Nations League
Third place	2023 Netherlands
CONMEBOL–UEFA Cup of Champions
Runner-up	2022 England
- * Club domestic league appearances and goals as of 21:09, 15 October 2026 (UTC) ‡ National team caps and goals as of 28 September 2026

Giacomo Raspadori Cavaliere OMRI (born 18 February 2000) is an Italian professional footballer who plays as a forward for Serie A club Atalanta and the Italy national team.

== Club career ==
=== Sassuolo ===
Raspadori joined the youth academy of Sassuolo in 2009, after a year with local club Progresso. On 9 August 2018, he signed his first professional contract with Sassuolo for four years. Raspadori made his professional debut with Sassuolo in a 3–1 Serie A defeat to Atalanta on 26 May 2019.

=== Napoli ===
On 20 August 2022, Napoli signed Raspadori on a one-year loan with an obligation to purchase. On 14 September, he scored his first Champions League goal in a 3–0 away win over Rangers. On 4 October, he scored a brace and provided an assist in a 6–1 away win over Ajax. On 12 October, he scored a goal in a 4–2 win over Ajax, in which his club managed to reach the knockout phase.

=== Atlético Madrid ===
On 11 August 2025, Raspadori officially joined La Liga club Atlético Madrid, signing a five-year contract. A month later, on 30 September, he netted his first goal for the club in a 5–1 victory over Eintracht Frankfurt in the Champions League.

=== Atalanta ===
On 15 January 2026, Raspadori returned to Italy and signed with Atalanta.

== International career ==
=== Youth ===
Raspadori took part in the 2019 UEFA European Under-19 Championship with the Italy U19 squad, scoring one goal in the tournament.

He made his debut with the Italy U21 squad on 3 September 2020, playing against Slovenia in a friendly match. He took part in the 2021 UEFA European Under-21 Championship where he scored one goal in the group stage phase.

=== Senior ===
In June 2021, Raspadori was called up by coach Roberto Mancini to the final 26-man squad for the UEFA Euro 2020 tournament, despite never having been capped for the Italy senior squad. On 4 June 2021, he debuted for Italy in a friendly win over the Czech Republic, replacing Ciro Immobile in the second half.

He made his only appearance of Euro 2020 on 20 June, in Italy's final group match against Wales in Rome, coming on as a second–half substitute for Federico Bernardeschi; the match ended in a 1–0 victory to the Italians, allowing them to top their group, On 11 July, Raspadori won the European Championship with Italy following a 3–2 penalty shoot-out victory over England at Wembley Stadium in the final, after a 1–1 draw in extra time. On 8 September 2021, Raspadori scored his first goal for the Italy senior national team, making the score 3–0 in an eventual 5–0 home win over Lithuania in a World Cup qualifier; ten minutes before, his off-goal shot also contributed to an own goal from the opposing defender Edgaras Utkus. In September 2022, he scored the only goal in a 1–0 win over England, then a goal in a 2–0 away win over Hungary, to qualify his country to the 2023 UEFA Nations League Finals.

== Style of play ==
Raspadori is a quick, diminutive, and agile forward, with a low centre of gravity, who is capable of playing as a second striker, as an out-and-out striker or centre-forward, as an attacking midfielder, and even as a winger in a 4–2–3–1 formation. He has also been deployed as a false 9 on occasion under Italy manager Luciano Spalletti; although seemingly fielded as a centre-forward in this role, he often drops deep to create space for the late runs of his midfield teammates. A two-footed player, who possesses good vision and technical skills, he is capable of both creating and scoring goals. He is also known for his ability to provide depth to his team and either exploit or create space with his runs, although he is also capable of dropping deep and linking-up with midfielders. His playing style has drawn comparisons with Antonio Di Natale and Carlos Tevez, although he has cited Sergio Agüero as one of his major inspirations.

In October 2021, he was described as "Italy's next centre-forward in the making" by Daniele Verri of BBC Sport.

== Personal life ==
In 2021, he was combining his football career with studying sports science at university. On 10 May 2024, Raspadori and his girlfriend Elisa had their first child.

== Career statistics ==
=== Club ===
As of match played 15 October 2026

Appearances and goals by club, season and competition
Club	Season	League			National cup (Note: Includes Coppa Italia, Copa del Rey)		Europe		Other		Total	
Club	Season	Division	Apps	Goals	Apps	Goals	Apps	Goals	Apps	Goals	Apps	Goals
Sassuolo	2018–19	Serie A	1	0	0	0	—		—		1	0
Sassuolo	2019–20	Serie A	11	2	2	0	—		—		13	2
Sassuolo	2020–21	Serie A	27	6	1	0	—		—		28	6
Sassuolo	2021–22	Serie A	36	10	2	0	—		—		38	10
Sassuolo	2022–23	Serie A	1	0	1	0	—		—		2	0
Sassuolo	Total		76	18	6	0	—		—		82	18
Napoli (loan)	2022–23	Serie A	25	2	1	0	7 (Note: Appearance(s) in UEFA Champions League)	4	—		33	6
Napoli	2023–24	Serie A	37	5	1	0	8	1	1 (Note: Appearance in Supercoppa Italiana)	0	47	6
Napoli	2024–25	Serie A	26	6	3	0	—		—		29	6
Napoli	Napoli total		88	13	5	0	15	5	1	0	109	18
Atlético Madrid	2025–26	La Liga	12	0	1	1	2	1	0	0	15	2
Atalanta	2025–26	Serie A	13	3	2	0	1	0	—		16	3
Atalanta	2026–27	Serie A	4	1	0	0	3 (Note: Appearances in UEFA Conference League)	1	—		7	2
Atalanta	Total		17	4	2	0	4	1	—		23	5
Career total			193	35	14	1	21	7	1	0	229	43

=== International ===
As of match played 28 September 2026

Appearances and goals by national team and year
National team	Year	Apps	Goals
Italy	2021	7	1
Italy	2022	10	4
Italy	2023	7	1
Italy	2024	12	1
Italy	2025	9	4
Italy	2026	2	0
Total		47	11

Italy score listed first, score column indicates score after each Raspadori goal.

List of international goals scored by Giacomo Raspadori
No.	Date	Venue	Cap	Opponent	Score	Result	Competition	Ref.
1	8 September 2021	Mapei Stadium – Città del Tricolore, Reggio Emilia, Italy	5	Lithuania	3–0	5–0	2022 FIFA World Cup qualification	
2	29 March 2022	Konya Metropolitan Municipality Stadium, Konya, Turkey	9	Turkey	2–1	3–2	Friendly	
3	29 March 2022	Konya Metropolitan Municipality Stadium, Konya, Turkey	9	Turkey	3–1	3–2	Friendly	
4	23 September 2022	San Siro, Milan, Italy	14	England	1–0	1–0	2022–23 UEFA Nations League A	
5	26 September 2022	Puskás Aréna, Budapest, Hungary	15	Hungary	1–0	2–0	2022–23 UEFA Nations League A	
6	17 November 2023	Stadio Olimpico, Rome, Italy	23	North Macedonia	4–2	5–2	UEFA Euro 2024 qualifying	
7	6 September 2024	Parc des Princes, Paris, France	31	France	3–1	3–1	2024–25 UEFA Nations League A	
8	23 March 2025	Westfalenstadion, Dortmund, Germany	38	Germany	3–3	3–3	2024–25 UEFA Nations League A	
9	9 June 2025	Mapei Stadium – Città del Tricolore, Reggio Emilia, Italy	40	Moldova	1–0	2–0	2026 FIFA World Cup qualification	
10	5 September 2025	Stadio Atleti Azzurri d'Italia, Bergamo, Italy	41	Estonia	3–0	5–0	2026 FIFA World Cup qualification	
11	8 September 2025	Nagyerdei Stadion, Debrecen, Hungary	42	Israel	4–2	5–4	2026 FIFA World Cup qualification	

== Honours ==
Napoli

- Serie A: 2022–23, 2024–25

Italy

- UEFA European Championship: 2020

Individual

- Serie A Player of the Month: January 2022

Orders

- 5th Class / Knight: Cavaliere Ordine al Merito della Repubblica Italiana: 2021
