= 2013 FIFA Confederations Cup statistics =

These are the statistics for the 2013 FIFA Confederations Cup, an eight-team tournament running from 15 June 2013 through 30 June 2013. The tournament took place in Brazil.

== Goalscorers ==
5 goals

- (Spain) Fernando Torres
- (Brazil) Fred

4 goals

- (Brazil) Neymar
- (Uruguay) Abel Hernández

3 goals

- (Mexico) Javier Hernández
- (Nigeria) Nnamdi Oduamadi
- (Spain) David Villa
- (Uruguay) Edinson Cavani
- (Uruguay) Luis Suárez

2 goals

- (Brazil) Jô
- (Brazil) Paulinho
- (Italy) Mario Balotelli
- (Japan) Shinji Okazaki
- (Spain) Jordi Alba
- (Spain) David Silva

1 goal

- (Brazil) Dante
- (Italy) Davide Astori
- (Italy) Giorgio Chiellini
- (Italy) Daniele De Rossi
- (Italy) Alessandro Diamanti
- (Italy) Emanuele Giaccherini
- (Italy) Sebastian Giovinco
- (Italy) Andrea Pirlo
- (Japan) Keisuke Honda
- (Japan) Shinji Kagawa
- (Nigeria) Elderson Echiéjilé
- (Nigeria) Mikel John Obi
- (Spain) Juan Mata
- (Spain) Pedro
- (Spain) Roberto Soldado
- (French Polynesia) Jonathan Tehau
- (Uruguay) Diego Forlán
- (Uruguay) Nicolás Lodeiro
- (Uruguay) Diego Lugano
- (Uruguay) Diego Pérez

Own goal

- (Japan) Atsuto Uchida (for Italy)
- (French Polynesia) Jonathan Tehau (for Nigeria)
- (French Polynesia) Nicolas Vallar (for Nigeria)

Source: FIFA

== Assists ==
3 assists

- (Uruguay) Walter Gargano
- (Brazil) Neymar

2 assists

- (Brazil) Oscar
- (Japan) Yasuhito Endō
- (Nigeria) Brown Ideye
- (Nigeria) Ahmed Musa
- (Spain) David Villa
- (Uruguay) Nicolás Lodeiro

1 assist

Twenty-six players

Source: FIFA

== Scoring ==
- Total number of goals scored: 68
- Average goals per match: 4.25
- Total number of hat-tricks: 4 – Nnamdi Oduamadi for Nigeria against Tahiti, Fernando Torres for Spain against Tahiti, David Villa for Spain against Tahiti, Abel Hernández for Uruguay against Tahiti
- Most goals scored by a team: 15 – Spain
- Most goals scored by an individual: 5 – Fernando Torres, Fred
- Most assists provided by an individual: 3 – Walter Gargano
- Most goals and assists produced by an individual: 4 goals and 3 assists – Neymar
- Fewest goals scored by a team: 1 – Tahiti
- Most goals conceded by a team: 24 – Tahiti
- Fewest goals conceded by a team: 3 – Brazil
- Best goal difference: +11 – Spain, Brazil
- Worst goal difference: −23 – Tahiti
- Most goals scored in a match by both teams: 10 – Spain (10) and Tahiti (0)
- Most goals scored in a match by one team: 10 – Spain against Tahiti
- Most goals scored in a match by the losing team: 3 – Japan against Italy (4)
- Biggest margin of victory: 10 goals – Spain against Tahiti
- Most clean sheets achieved by a team: 3 – Spain, Brazil
- Fewest clean sheets achieved by a team: 0 – Japan, Mexico, Nigeria, Tahiti
- Most clean sheets given by an opposing team: 2 – Tahiti and Spain
- Fewest clean sheets given by an opposing team: 0 – Brazil, Uruguay
- Most consecutive clean sheets achieved by a team: 3 – Spain
- Most consecutive clean sheets given by an opposing team: 2 – Tahiti
- First goal of the tournament: Neymar for Brazil against Japan
- First hat-trick of the tournament: Nnamdi Oduamadi for Nigeria against Tahiti
- Fastest goal in a match from kickoff: 2nd minute – Fred for Brazil against Spain
- Latest goal in a match without extra time: 90+3rd minute – Jô for Brazil against Japan, Jô for Brazil against Mexico
- Latest winning goal in a match without extra time: 86th minute – Sebastian Giovinco for Italy against Japan, Paulinho for Brazil against Uruguay
- Most goals scored by one player in a match: 4 – Fernando Torres for Spain against Tahiti, Abel Hernández for Uruguay against Tahiti
- Oldest goal scorer: 34 years, 1 month and 1 day old – Diego Forlán for Uruguay against Nigeria
- Youngest goal scorer: 21 years, 4 months and 13 days old – Neymar for Brazil against Japan

== Man of the Match ==
Rank	Name	Team	Awards	Against
1	(Brazil) Neymar	Brazil	4	Japan (GS), Mexico (GS), Italy (GS), Spain (F)
2	(Brazil) Júlio César	Brazil	1	Uruguay (SF)
2	(Italy) Andrea Pirlo	Italy	1	Mexico (GS)
2	(Japan) Shinji Kagawa	Japan	1	Italy (GS)
2	(Mexico) Javier Hernández	Mexico	1	Japan (GS)
2	(Nigeria) Nnamdi Oduamadi	Nigeria	1	Tahiti (GS)
2	(Spain) Jordi Alba	Spain	1	Nigeria (GS)
2	(Spain) Iker Casillas	Spain	1	Italy (SF)
2	(Spain) Andrés Iniesta	Spain	1	Uruguay (GS)
2	(Spain) Fernando Torres	Spain	1	Tahiti (GS)
2	(Uruguay) Edinson Cavani	Uruguay	1	Italy (TP)
2	(Uruguay) Diego Forlán	Uruguay	1	Nigeria (GS)
2	(Uruguay) Abel Hernández	Uruguay	1	Tahiti (GS)

== Overall statistics ==
Bold numbers indicate the maximum values in each column.

Team	Pld	W	D	L	Pts	APts	GF	AGF	GA	AGA	GD	AGD	CS	ACS	YC	AYC	RC	ARC
**Brazil**	**5**	**5**	0	0	**15**	**3.00**	14	2.80	3	0.60	**+11**	**2.20**	**3**	**0.60**	8	1.60	0	0.00
Italy	**5**	2	2	1	8	1.60	10	2.00	10	2.00	0	0.00	1	0.20	10	2.00	**1**	0.20
Japan	3	0	0	**3**	0	0.00	4	1.33	9	3.00	−5	−1.67	0	0.00	4	1.33	0	0.00
Mexico	3	1	0	2	3	1.00	3	1.00	5	1.67	−2	−0.67	0	0.00	6	2.00	0	0.00
Nigeria	3	1	0	2	3	1.00	7	2.33	6	2.00	+1	0.33	0	0.00	3	1.00	0	0.00
Spain	**5**	3	1	1	10	2.00	**15**	**3.00**	4	0.80	**+11**	**2.20**	**3**	**0.60**	6	1.20	**1**	0.20
Tahiti	3	0	0	**3**	0	0.00	1	0.33	**24**	**8.00**	−23	−7.67	0	0.00	4	1.33	**1**	**0.33**
Uruguay	**5**	2	1	**2**	7	1.40	14	2.80	7	1.40	+7	1.40	1	0.20	**11**	**2.20**	**1**	0.20
Total	16^{(1)}	14	2^{(2)}	14	46	1.44	68	2.13	68	2.13	0	0.00	8	0.25	52	1.63	4	0.13

Updated to games played on 2 July 2013. Team(s) rendered in italics represent(s) the host nation(s). The competition's winning team is rendered in bold.
^{(1)} – Total games lost not counted in total games played (total games lost = total games won)
^{(2)} – Total number of games drawn (tied) for all teams = Total number of games drawn (tied) ÷ 2 (both teams involved)

== Stadiums ==
Stadium	City	Capacity	Matches played	Overall attendance	Average attendance per match	Average attendance as % of Capacity	Overall goals scored	Average goals scored per match
Estádio Castelão	Fortaleza	64,846	3	165150	55,050	84.9	5	1.67
Arena Fonte Nova	Salvador	48,747	3	119025	39,675	81.4	13	4.33
Estádio do Maracanã	Rio de Janeiro	76,804	3	218460	72,820	94.8	16	5.33
Estádio Mineirão	Belo Horizonte	62,547	3	130360	43,453	69.5	13	4.33
Estádio Nacional Mané Garrincha	Brasília	68,009	1	67423	67,423	99.1	3	3
Arena Pernambuco	Recife	44,248	3	104241	34,747	78.5	18	6
Total		959585	16	804659	50,291	83.9	68	4.25
