= Italy at the FIFA Confederations Cup =

Football tournament results

The Italy national football team were represented at the FIFA Confederations Cup on two occasions in 2009 and 2013.

== FIFA Confederations Cup ==
FIFA Confederations Cup record
Year	Round	Position	Pld	W	D*	L	GF	GA
(Saudi Arabia) 1992	No European team participated							
(Saudi Arabia) 1995	Did not qualify							
(Saudi Arabia) 1997	Did not qualify							
(Mexico) 1999	Did not qualify							
(South Korea) (Japan) 2001	Did not qualify							
(France) 2003	Did not enter (Note: As UEFA Euro 2000 runners-up.)							
(Germany) 2005	Did not qualify							
(South Africa) 2009	Group stage	5th	3	1	0	2	3	5
(Brazil) 2013	Third place	3rd	5	2	2	1	10	10
(Russia) 2017	Did not qualify							
Total	Third place	2/10	8	3	2	3	13	15

*Denotes draws include knockout matches decided via penalty shoot-out.

Italy's Confederations Cup record
First match	Italy 3–1 United States (15 June 2009; Pretoria, South Africa)
Biggest win	Italy 3–1 United States (15 June 2009; Pretoria, South Africa)
Biggest defeat	Brazil 3–0 Italy (21 June 2009; Pretoria, South Africa)
Best result	Third place in 2013
Worst result	Group stage in 2009

== 2009 FIFA Confederations Cup ==
=== Group B ===
Pos	Team	Pld	W	D	L	GF	GA	GD	Pts	
1	Brazil	3	3	0	0	10	3	+7	9	Advance to knockout stage
2	United States	3	1	0	2	4	6	−2	3	Advance to knockout stage
3	Italy	3	1	0	2	3	5	−2	3	
4	Egypt	3	1	0	2	4	7	−3	3	

Source: FIFA
15 June 2009
20:30 SAST

United States	1–3	Italy
Donovan 41' (pen.)	Report	Rossi 58', 90+4'; De Rossi 72'

Loftus Versfeld Stadium, Pretoria
Attendance: 34,341
Referee: Pablo Pozo (Chile)

18 June 2009
20:30 SAST

Egypt	1–0	Italy
Homos 39'	Report

Ellis Park Stadium, Johannesburg
Attendance: 52,150
Referee: Martin Hansson (Sweden)

21 June 2009
20:30 SAST

Italy	0–3	Brazil
	Report	Luís Fabiano 37', 43'; Dossena 45' (o.g.)

Loftus Versfeld Stadium, Pretoria
Attendance: 41,195
Referee: Benito Archundia (Mexico)

== 2013 FIFA Confederations Cup ==
=== Group A ===
Pos	Team	Pld	W	D	L	GF	GA	GD	Pts	Qualification
1	Brazil (H)	3	3	0	0	9	2	+7	9	Advance to knockout stage
2	Italy	3	2	0	1	8	8	0	6	Advance to knockout stage
3	Mexico	3	1	0	2	3	5	−2	3	
4	Japan	3	0	0	3	4	9	−5	0	

Source: FIFA
(H) Hosts

16 June 2013
16:00

Mexico	1–2	Italy
Hernández 34' (pen.)	Report	Pirlo 27'; Balotelli 78'

Estádio do Maracanã, Rio de Janeiro
Attendance: 73,123
Referee: Enrique Osses (Chile)

19 June 2013
19:00

Italy	4–3	Japan
De Rossi 41'; Uchida 50' (o.g.); Balotelli 52' (pen.); Giovinco 86'	Report	Honda 21' (pen.); Kagawa 33'; Okazaki 69'

Itaipava Arena Pernambuco, Recife
Attendance: 40,489
Referee: Diego Abal (Argentina)

22 June 2013
16:00

Italy	2–4	Brazil
Giaccherini 51'; Chiellini 71'	Report	Dante 45+1'; Neymar 55'; Fred 66', 89'

Itaipava Arena Fonte Nova, Salvador
Attendance: 48,874
Referee: Ravshan Irmatov (Uzbekistan)

=== Semi-finals ===
27 June 2013
16:00

Spain	0–0 (a.e.t.)	Italy
	Report
Penalties
Xavi (penalty scored); Iniesta (penalty scored); Piqué (penalty scored); Ramos (penalty scored); Mata (penalty scored); Busquets (penalty scored); Navas (penalty scored)	7–6	(penalty scored) Candreva; (penalty scored) Aquilani; (penalty scored) De Rossi; (penalty scored) Giovinco; (penalty scored) Pirlo; (penalty scored) Montolivo; (penalty missed) Bonucci

Estádio Castelão, Fortaleza
Attendance: 56,083
Referee: Howard Webb (England)

=== Third place play-off ===
30 June 2013
13:00

Uruguay	2–2 (a.e.t.)	Italy
Cavani 58', 78'	Report	Astori 24'; Diamanti 73'
Penalties
Forlán (penalty missed); Cavani (penalty scored); Suárez (penalty scored); Cáceres (penalty missed); Gargano (penalty missed)	2–3	(penalty scored) Aquilani; (penalty scored) El Shaarawy; (penalty missed) De Sciglio; (penalty scored) Giaccherini

Itaipava Arena Fonte Nova, Salvador
Attendance: 43,382
Referee: Djamel Haimoudi (Algeria)

== Goalscorers ==
Rank	Player	Goals	Confederations Cup
1	Mario Balotelli	2	2013
1	Daniele De Rossi	2	2009 (1) and 2013 (1)
1	Giuseppe Rossi	2	2009
4
4	Davide Astori	1	2013
4	Giorgio Chiellini	1	2013
4	Alessandro Diamanti	1	2013
4	Emanuele Giaccherini	1	2013
4	Sebastian Giovinco	1	2013
4	Andrea Pirlo	1	2013

1 Own goal

- (Japan) Atsuto Uchida (2013)

== See also ==
- Italy at the FIFA World Cup
- Italy at the UEFA European Championship
