= 2013 FIFA Confederations Cup knockout stage =

Football tournament knockout stage

The knockout stage of the 2013 FIFA Confederations Cup began on 26 June with the semi-final round, and concluded on 30 June 2013 with the final at the Estádio do Maracanã, Rio de Janeiro. The top two teams from each group advanced to the knockout stage to compete in a single-elimination style tournament. A third place match was included and played between the two losing teams of the semi-finals.

In the knockout stage (including the final), if a match was level at the end of 90 minutes, extra time of two periods (15 minutes each) would be played. If the score was still level after extra time, the match would be decided by a penalty shoot-out.

== Qualified teams ==
Group	Winners	Runners-up
A	Brazil	Italy
B	Spain	Uruguay

== Bracket ==
Semi-finals
26 June – Belo Horizonte
Brazil	2
Uruguay	1
27 June – Fortaleza
Spain (p)	0 (7)
Italy	0 (6)

Final
30 June – Rio de Janeiro
Brazil	3
Spain	0
Third place play-off
30 June – Salvador
Uruguay	2 (2)
Italy (p)	2 (3)

== Semi-finals ==
=== Brazil vs Uruguay ===
26 June 2013
16:00

Brazil	2–1	Uruguay
Fred 41'; Paulinho 86'	Report	Cavani 48'

Estádio Mineirão, Belo Horizonte
Attendance: 57,483
Referee: Enrique Osses (Chile)

Brazil	Uruguay

GK	12	Júlio César
RB	2	Dani Alves
CB	3	Thiago Silva (c)
CB	4	David Luiz	(yellow card) 13'
LB	6	Marcelo	(yellow card) 75'
CM	18	Paulinho
CM	17	Luiz Gustavo	(yellow card) 39'
AM	11	Oscar		(substituted off) 73'
RW	19	Hulk		(substituted off) 64'
LW	10	Neymar		(substituted off) 90+1'
CF	9	Fred
Substitutions:
MF	20	Bernard		(substituted on) 64'
MF	8	Hernanes		(substituted on) 73'
DF	13	Dante		(substituted on) 90+1'
Manager:
Luiz Felipe Scolari

GK	1	Fernando Muslera
RB	16	Maxi Pereira
CB	2	Diego Lugano (c)
CB	3	Diego Godín
LB	22	Martín Cáceres
DM	17	Egidio Arévalo Ríos
RM	20	Álvaro González	(yellow card) 74'	(substituted off) 83'
LM	7	Cristian Rodríguez
AM	10	Diego Forlán
CF	21	Edinson Cavani	(yellow card) 21'
CF	9	Luis Suárez
Substitutions:
MF	5	Walter Gargano		(substituted on) 83'
Manager:
Óscar Tabárez

Man of the Match:
Júlio César (Brazil)

Assistant referees:
Carlos Astroza (Chile)
Sergio Román (Chile)
Fourth official:
Joel Aguilar (El Salvador)
Fifth official:
William Torres (El Salvador)

=== Spain vs Italy ===
27 June 2013
16:00

Spain	0–0 (a.e.t.)	Italy
	Report
Penalties
Xavi (penalty scored); Iniesta (penalty scored); Piqué (penalty scored); Ramos (penalty scored); Mata (penalty scored); Busquets (penalty scored); Navas (penalty scored)	7–6	(penalty scored) Candreva; (penalty scored) Aquilani; (penalty scored) De Rossi; (penalty scored) Giovinco; (penalty scored) Pirlo; (penalty scored) Montolivo; (penalty missed) Bonucci

Estádio Castelão, Fortaleza
Attendance: 56,083
Referee: Howard Webb (England)

Spain	Italy

GK	1	Iker Casillas (c)
RB	17	Álvaro Arbeloa
CB	15	Sergio Ramos
CB	3	Gerard Piqué	(yellow card) 105+1'
LB	18	Jordi Alba
DM	16	Sergio Busquets
CM	8	Xavi
CM	6	Andrés Iniesta
RW	11	Pedro		(substituted off) 79'
LW	21	David Silva		(substituted off) 53'
CF	9	Fernando Torres		(substituted off) 94'
Substitutions:
MF	22	Jesús Navas		(substituted on) 53'
MF	13	Juan Mata		(substituted on) 79'
MF	4	Javi Martínez		(substituted on) 94'
Manager:
Vicente del Bosque

GK	1	Gianluigi Buffon (c)
CB	15	Andrea Barzagli		(substituted off) 46'
CB	19	Leonardo Bonucci
CB	3	Giorgio Chiellini
CM	21	Andrea Pirlo
CM	16	Daniele De Rossi	(yellow card) 65'
RM	2	Christian Maggio
LM	22	Emanuele Giaccherini
AM	6	Antonio Candreva
AM	8	Claudio Marchisio		(substituted off) 80'
CF	11	Alberto Gilardino		(substituted off) 91'
Substitutions:
MF	18	Riccardo Montolivo		(substituted on) 46'
MF	7	Alberto Aquilani		(substituted on) 80'
FW	10	Sebastian Giovinco		(substituted on) 91'
Manager:
Cesare Prandelli

Man of the Match:
Iker Casillas (Spain)

Assistant referees:
Michael Mullarkey (England)
Darren Cann (England)
Fourth official:
Pedro Proença (Portugal)
Fifth official:
Bertino Miranda (Portugal)

== Third place play-off ==
30 June 2013
13:00

Uruguay	2–2 (a.e.t.)	Italy
Cavani 58', 78'	Report	Astori 24'; Diamanti 73'
Penalties
Forlán (penalty missed); Cavani (penalty scored); Suárez (penalty scored); Cáceres (penalty missed); Gargano (penalty missed)	2–3	(penalty scored) Aquilani; (penalty scored) El Shaarawy; (penalty missed) De Sciglio; (penalty scored) Giaccherini

Itaipava Arena Fonte Nova, Salvador
Attendance: 43,382
Referee: Djamel Haimoudi (Algeria)

Uruguay	Italy

GK	1	Fernando Muslera
RB	16	Maxi Pereira	(yellow card) 8'	(substituted off) 81'
CB	2	Diego Lugano (c)
CB	3	Diego Godín
LB	22	Martín Cáceres
RM	5	Walter Gargano
CM	17	Egidio Arévalo Ríos		(substituted off) 106'
LM	7	Cristian Rodríguez		(substituted off) 56'
AM	10	Diego Forlán
CF	21	Edinson Cavani
CF	9	Luis Suárez	(yellow card) 61'
Substitutions:
MF	20	Álvaro González		(substituted on) 56'
MF	6	Álvaro Pereira		(substituted on) 81'
MF	15	Diego Pérez		(substituted on) 106'
Manager:
Óscar Tabárez

GK	1	Gianluigi Buffon (c)
RB	2	Christian Maggio
CB	4	Davide Astori		(substituted off) 95'
CB	3	Giorgio Chiellini	(yellow card) 55'
LB	5	Mattia De Sciglio
RM	6	Antonio Candreva
CM	16	Daniele De Rossi		(substituted off) 70'
LM	18	Riccardo Montolivo	(yellow card) 82' (yellow-red card) 110'
AM	23	Alessandro Diamanti		(substituted off) 82'
AM	14	Stephan El Shaarawy
CF	11	Alberto Gilardino
Substitutions:
MF	7	Alberto Aquilani		(substituted on) 70'
MF	22	Emanuele Giaccherini		(substituted on) 82'
DF	19	Leonardo Bonucci		(substituted on) 95'
Manager:
Cesare Prandelli

Man of the Match:
Edinson Cavani (Uruguay)

Assistant referees:
Redouane Achik (Morocco)
Abdelhak Etchiali (Algeria)
Fourth official:
Yuichi Nishimura (Japan)
Fifth official:
Toru Sagara (Japan)

== Final ==
30 June 2013
19:00

Brazil	3–0	Spain
Fred 2', 48'; Neymar 44'	Report

Estádio do Maracanã, Rio de Janeiro
Attendance: 73,531
Referee: Björn Kuipers (Netherlands)

Brazil	Spain

GK	12	Júlio César
RB	2	Dani Alves
CB	3	Thiago Silva (c)
CB	4	David Luiz
LB	6	Marcelo
DM	18	Paulinho	(substituted off) 88'
DM	17	Luiz Gustavo
CM	11	Oscar
RW	19	Hulk	(substituted off) 73'
LW	10	Neymar
CF	9	Fred	(substituted off) 80'
Substitutions:
MF	23	Jádson	(substituted on) 73'
FW	21	Jô	(substituted on) 80'
MF	8	Hernanes	(substituted on) 88'
Manager:
Luiz Felipe Scolari

GK	1	Iker Casillas (c)
RB	17	Álvaro Arbeloa	(yellow card) 15'	(substituted off) 46'
CB	15	Sergio Ramos	(yellow card) 28'
CB	3	Gerard Piqué	(red card) 68'
LB	18	Jordi Alba
DM	16	Sergio Busquets
CM	8	Xavi
CM	6	Andrés Iniesta
RW	11	Pedro
LW	13	Juan Mata		(substituted off) 52'
CF	9	Fernando Torres		(substituted off) 59'
Substitutions:
DF	5	César Azpilicueta		(substituted on) 46'
MF	22	Jesús Navas		(substituted on) 52'
FW	7	David Villa		(substituted on) 59'
Manager:
Vicente del Bosque

Man of the Match:
Neymar (Brazil)

Assistant referees:
Sander van Roekel (Netherlands)
Erwin Zeinstra (Netherlands)
Fourth official:
Felix Brych (Germany)
Fifth official:
Mark Borsch (Germany)
