= 2013 FIFA Confederations Cup Group A =

Football tournament group stage

Group A of the 2013 FIFA Confederations Cup took place from 15 to 22 June 2013 in Belo Horizonte's Mineirão, Brasília's Mané Garrincha, Fortaleza's Castelão, Recife's Arena Pernambuco, Rio de Janeiro's, Maracanã and Salvador's Arena Fonte Nova. The group consisted of host nation and defending champions Brazil, Italy, Japan, and Mexico.

== Teams ==
Draw position	Team	Confederation	Method of qualification	Date of qualification	Finals appearance	Last appearance	Previous best performance	FIFA Rankings	
Draw position	Team	Confederation	Method of qualification	Date of qualification	Finals appearance	Last appearance	Previous best performance	November 2012 (Note: The rankings of November 2013 were used for seeding for the final draw.)	June 2013
A1	Brazil	CONMEBOL	Host	30 October 2007	1997, 1999, 2005, 2009	2009	Champions (1997, 2005, 2009)		
A2	Italy	UEFA	UEFA Euro 2012 runners-up (Note: Due to Spain qualifying as 2010 FIFA World Cup and UEFA Euro 2012 winners.)	28 June 2012	N/A	2009	Group stage (2009)		
A3	Mexico	CONCACAF	2011 CONCACAF Gold Cup winners	25 June 2011	1999	2005	Champions (1999)		
A4	Japan	AFC	2011 AFC Asian Cup winners	29 January 2011	2001	2005	Runners-up (2001)		

== Standings ==
Pos	Team	Pld	W	D	L	GF	GA	GD	Pts	Qualification
1	Brazil (H)	3	3	0	0	9	2	+7	9	Advance to knockout stage
2	Italy	3	2	0	1	8	8	0	6	Advance to knockout stage
3	Mexico	3	1	0	2	3	5	−2	3	
4	Japan	3	0	0	3	4	9	−5	0	

Source: FIFA
(H) Hosts

In the semi-finals:

- The winners of Group A, Brazil, advanced to play the runners-up of Group B, Uruguay.
- The runners-up of Group A, Italy, advanced to play the winners of Group B, Spain.

== Matches ==
=== Brazil vs Japan ===
15 June 2013
16:00

Brazil	3–0	Japan
Neymar 3'; Paulinho 48'; Jô 90+3'	Report

Estádio Nacional Mané Garrincha, Brasília
Attendance: 67,423
Referee: Pedro Proença (Portugal)

Brazil	Japan

GK	12	Júlio César
RB	2	Dani Alves
CB	3	Thiago Silva (c)
CB	4	David Luiz
LB	6	Marcelo
DM	17	Luiz Gustavo
CM	18	Paulinho
AM	11	Oscar
RW	19	Hulk	(substituted off) 75'
LW	10	Neymar	(substituted off) 74'
CF	9	Fred	(substituted off) 81'
Substitutions:
MF	7	Lucas Moura	(substituted on) 74'
MF	8	Hernanes	(substituted on) 75'
FW	21	Jô	(substituted on) 81'
Manager:
Luiz Felipe Scolari

GK	1	Eiji Kawashima
RB	6	Atsuto Uchida
CB	22	Maya Yoshida
CB	15	Yasuyuki Konno
LB	5	Yuto Nagatomo
CM	17	Makoto Hasebe (c)	(yellow card) 45+1'
CM	7	Yasuhito Endō		(substituted off) 78'
RW	8	Hiroshi Kiyotake		(substituted off) 51'
AM	4	Keisuke Honda		(substituted off) 88'
LW	10	Shinji Kagawa
CF	9	Shinji Okazaki
Substitutions:
FW	18	Ryoichi Maeda		(substituted on) 51'
MF	13	Hajime Hosogai		(substituted on) 78'
MF	19	Takashi Inui		(substituted on) 88'
Manager:
(Italy) Alberto Zaccheroni

Man of the Match:
Neymar (Brazil)

Assistant referees:
Bertino Miranda (Portugal)
José Trigo (Portugal)
Fourth official:
Felix Brych (Germany)
Fifth official:
Mark Borsch (Germany)

=== Mexico vs Italy ===
16 June 2013
16:00

Mexico	1–2	Italy
Hernández 34' (pen.)	Report	Pirlo 27'; Balotelli 78'

Estádio do Maracanã, Rio de Janeiro
Attendance: 73,123
Referee: Enrique Osses (Chile)

Mexico	Italy

GK	12	José de Jesús Corona
RB	22	Gerardo Flores
CB	2	Francisco Javier Rodríguez (c)
CB	15	Héctor Moreno	(yellow card) 47'
LB	3	Carlos Salcido
CM	17	Jesús Zavala		(substituted off) 86'
CM	6	Gerardo Torrado
RW	11	Javier Aquino		(substituted off) 53'
AM	10	Giovani dos Santos	(yellow card) 58'
LW	18	Andrés Guardado
CF	14	Javier Hernández
Substitutions:
DF	21	Hiram Mier		(substituted on) 53'
FW	19	Raúl Jiménez		(substituted on) 86'
Manager:
José Manuel de la Torre

GK	1	Gianluigi Buffon (c)
RB	20	Ignazio Abate
CB	15	Andrea Barzagli	(yellow card) 34'
CB	3	Giorgio Chiellini
LB	5	Mattia De Sciglio
RM	16	Daniele De Rossi	(yellow card) 81'
CM	21	Andrea Pirlo
LM	18	Riccardo Montolivo
AM	8	Claudio Marchisio		(substituted off) 68'
AM	22	Emanuele Giaccherini		(substituted off) 88'
CF	9	Mario Balotelli	(yellow card) 79'	(substituted off) 86'
Substitutions:
MF	17	Alessio Cerci		(substituted on) 68'
FW	11	Alberto Gilardino		(substituted on) 86'
MF	7	Alberto Aquilani		(substituted on) 88'
Manager:
Cesare Prandelli

Man of the Match:
Andrea Pirlo (Italy)

Assistant referees:
Carlos Astroza (Chile)
Sergio Román (Chile)
Fourth official:
Djamel Haimoudi (Algeria)
Fifth official:
Redouane Achik (Morocco)

=== Brazil vs Mexico ===
19 June 2013
16:00

Brazil	2–0	Mexico
Neymar 9'; Jô 90+3'	Report

Estádio Castelão, Fortaleza
Attendance: 57,804
Referee: Howard Webb (England)

Brazil	Mexico

GK	12	Júlio César
RB	2	Dani Alves	(yellow card) 76'
CB	3	Thiago Silva (c)	(yellow card) 44'
CB	4	David Luiz
LB	6	Marcelo
DM	17	Luiz Gustavo
CM	18	Paulinho
CM	11	Oscar		(substituted off) 62'
RW	19	Hulk		(substituted off) 78'
LW	10	Neymar
CF	9	Fred		(substituted off) 82'
Substitutions:
MF	8	Hernanes		(substituted on) 62'
MF	7	Lucas Moura		(substituted on) 78'
FW	21	Jô		(substituted on) 82'
Manager:
Luiz Felipe Scolari

GK	12	José de Jesús Corona
RB	21	Hiram Mier
CB	2	Francisco Javier Rodríguez (c)	(yellow card) 90'
CB	15	Héctor Moreno
LB	20	Jorge Torres Nilo		(substituted off) 70'
CM	3	Carlos Salcido
CM	6	Gerardo Torrado		(substituted off) 88'
RW	22	Gerardo Flores		(substituted off) 58'
AM	10	Giovani dos Santos
LW	18	Andrés Guardado	(yellow card) 21'
CF	14	Javier Hernández
Substitutions:
MF	16	Héctor Herrera	(yellow card) 89'	(substituted on) 58'
MF	7	Pablo Barrera		(substituted on) 70'
FW	19	Raúl Jiménez		(substituted on) 88'
Manager:
José Manuel de la Torre

Man of the Match:
Neymar (Brazil)

Assistant referees:
Michael Mullarkey (England)
Darren Cann (England)
Fourth official:
Enrique Osses (Chile)
Fifth official:
Carlos Astroza (Chile)

=== Italy vs Japan ===
19 June 2013
19:00

Italy	4–3	Japan
De Rossi 41'; Uchida 50' (o.g.); Balotelli 52' (pen.); Giovinco 86'	Report	Honda 21' (pen.); Kagawa 33'; Okazaki 69'

Itaipava Arena Pernambuco, Recife
Attendance: 40,489
Referee: Diego Abal (Argentina)

Italy	Japan

GK	1	Gianluigi Buffon (c)	(yellow card) 20'
RB	2	Christian Maggio		(substituted off) 59'
CB	15	Andrea Barzagli
CB	3	Giorgio Chiellini
LB	5	Mattia De Sciglio
DM	21	Andrea Pirlo
RM	18	Riccardo Montolivo
LM	16	Daniele De Rossi	(yellow card) 36'
AM	7	Alberto Aquilani		(substituted off) 30'
AM	22	Emanuele Giaccherini		(substituted off) 68'
CF	9	Mario Balotelli
Substitutions:
FW	10	Sebastian Giovinco		(substituted on) 30'
DF	20	Ignazio Abate		(substituted on) 59'
MF	8	Claudio Marchisio		(substituted on) 68'
Manager:
Cesare Prandelli

GK	1	Eiji Kawashima
RB	6	Atsuto Uchida		(substituted off) 73'
CB	22	Maya Yoshida
CB	15	Yasuyuki Konno	(yellow card) 90'
LB	5	Yuto Nagatomo
CM	17	Makoto Hasebe (c)	(yellow card) 52'	(substituted off) 90+2'
CM	7	Yasuhito Endō
RW	9	Shinji Okazaki
AM	4	Keisuke Honda
LW	10	Shinji Kagawa
CF	18	Ryoichi Maeda		(substituted off) 79'
Substitutions:
DF	21	Hiroki Sakai		(substituted on) 73'
FW	11	Mike Havenaar		(substituted on) 79'
MF	14	Kengo Nakamura		(substituted on) 90+2'
Manager:
(Italy) Alberto Zaccheroni

Man of the Match:
Shinji Kagawa (Japan)

Assistant referees:
Hernán Maidana (Argentina)
Juan Pablo Belatti (Argentina)
Fourth official:
Joel Aguilar (El Salvador)
Fifth official:
William Torres (El Salvador)

=== Italy vs Brazil ===
22 June 2013
16:00

Italy	2–4	Brazil
Giaccherini 51'; Chiellini 71'	Report	Dante 45+1'; Neymar 55'; Fred 66', 89'

Itaipava Arena Fonte Nova, Salvador
Attendance: 48,874
Referee: Ravshan Irmatov (Uzbekistan)

Italy	Brazil

GK	1	Gianluigi Buffon (c)
RB	20	Ignazio Abate		(substituted off) 30'
CB	19	Leonardo Bonucci
CB	3	Giorgio Chiellini
LB	5	Mattia De Sciglio
CM	18	Riccardo Montolivo		(substituted off) 26'
CM	7	Alberto Aquilani
RW	6	Antonio Candreva
AM	8	Claudio Marchisio	(yellow card) 40'
LW	23	Alessandro Diamanti		(substituted off) 72'
CF	9	Mario Balotelli
Substitutions:
MF	22	Emanuele Giaccherini		(substituted on) 26'
DF	2	Christian Maggio		(substituted on) 30'
FW	14	Stephan El Shaarawy		(substituted on) 72'
Manager:
Cesare Prandelli

GK	12	Júlio César
RB	2	Dani Alves
CB	3	Thiago Silva (c)
CB	4	David Luiz	(yellow card) 8'	(substituted off) 33'
LB	6	Marcelo
CM	8	Hernanes
CM	17	Luiz Gustavo	(yellow card) 44'
RW	19	Hulk		(substituted off) 76'
AM	11	Oscar
LW	10	Neymar	(yellow card) 28'	(substituted off) 69'
CF	9	Fred
Substitutions:
DF	13	Dante		(substituted on) 33'
MF	20	Bernard		(substituted on) 69'
MF	5	Fernando		(substituted on) 76'
Manager:
Luiz Felipe Scolari

Man of the Match:
Neymar (Brazil)

Assistant referees:
Abduxamidullo Rasulov (Uzbekistan)
Bakhadyr Kochkarov (Kyrgyzstan)
Fourth official:
Yuichi Nishimura (Japan)
Fifth official:
Toru Sagara (Japan)

=== Japan vs Mexico ===
22 June 2013
16:00

Japan	1–2	Mexico
Okazaki 86'	Report	Hernández 54', 66'

Estádio Mineirão, Belo Horizonte
Attendance: 52,690
Referee: Felix Brych (Germany)

Japan	Mexico

GK	1	Eiji Kawashima
RB	21	Hiroki Sakai	(yellow card) 38'	(substituted off) 58'
CB	16	Yuzo Kurihara
CB	15	Yasuyuki Konno
LB	5	Yuto Nagatomo		(substituted off) 77'
CM	13	Hajime Hosogai
CM	7	Yasuhito Endō (c)
RW	9	Shinji Okazaki
AM	4	Keisuke Honda
LW	10	Shinji Kagawa
CF	18	Ryoichi Maeda		(substituted off) 65'
Substitutions:
DF	6	Atsuto Uchida		(substituted on) 58'
DF	22	Maya Yoshida		(substituted on) 65'
MF	14	Kengo Nakamura		(substituted on) 77'
Manager:
(Italy) Alberto Zaccheroni

GK	1	Guillermo Ochoa	(yellow card) 90+5'
RB	21	Hiram Mier
CB	4	Diego Reyes
CB	15	Héctor Moreno
LB	20	Jorge Torres Nilo
CM	6	Gerardo Torrado (c)
CM	17	Jesús Zavala
RW	10	Giovani dos Santos		(substituted off) 78'
LW	18	Andrés Guardado		(substituted off) 71'
CF	19	Raúl Jiménez		(substituted off) 90'
CF	14	Javier Hernández
Substitutions:
DF	3	Carlos Salcido		(substituted on) 71'
MF	7	Pablo Barrera		(substituted on) 78'
MF	11	Javier Aquino		(substituted on) 90'
Manager:
José Manuel de la Torre

Man of the Match:
Javier Hernández (Mexico)

Assistant referees:
Mark Borsch (Germany)
Stefan Lupp (Germany)
Fourth official:
Howard Webb (England)
Fifth official:
Michael Mullarkey (England)
