= Nnamdi Oduamadi =

Nigerian footballer (born 1990)

Personal information
- Full name: Nnamdi Oduamadi Chidiebere
- Date of birth: 17 October 1990 (age 36)
- Place of birth: Lagos, Nigeria
- Height: 1.75 m (5 ft 9 in)
- Position: Forward

Team information
- Current team: Colleferro

Youth career
- 1997–2008: Pepsi Football Academy
- 2009–2010: AC Milan

Senior career*
Years	Team	Apps	(Gls)
2010–2011	Genoa	1	(0)
2010–2011	→ AC Milan (loan)	1	(0)
2011–2018	AC Milan	0	(0)
2011–2012	→ Torino (loan)	11	(3)
2012–2013	→ Varese (loan)	16	(2)
2013–2014	→ Brescia (loan)	14	(0)
2014	→ Varese (loan)	12	(4)
2014–2015	→ Crotone (loan)	12	(1)
2015	→ Latina (loan)	16	(2)
2015	→ Şanlıurfaspor (loan)	1	(0)
2016	→ HJK Helsinki (loan)	28	(7)
2018–2019	Tirana	11	(1)
2021	Crema	6	(0)
2022–	Colleferro	0	(0)

International career
- Nigeria U17
- Nigeria U20
2011–2014	Nigeria	13	(4)
- * Club domestic league appearances and goals as of 19 January 2022

Nnamdi Oduamadi Chidiebere (born 17 October 1990), also known by his shirt name Odu, is a Nigerian professional footballer who plays as a forward currently under contract for Eccellenza club Colleferro. He has represented the Nigeria national team in the past.

== Club career ==
=== Early career ===
Born in Lagos, Oduamadi started playing football at the local Pepsi Football Academy at the age of 7. He left his home country in 2008 to join Milan, although he was officially signed only in January 2009 due to bureaucratic issues. Oduamadi spent two seasons in the club's youth system and was a member of the under-20 side who won the Coppa Italia Primavera in 2010, 25 years after the team's last success in the competition.

At the beginning of the 2010–11 season, Milan announced to have sold half of the rights to Oduamadi to Genoa in co-ownership for €3.5 million, as part of the deal that saw defender Sokratis Papastathopoulos move the other way. The Nigerian, though, stayed at Milan on loan, being included in the first team squad. He made his official debut for the club in a league game against Catania on 18 September 2010, coming off the bench in the last minutes. However, that remained his only appearance of the season and he still played games for the under-20 team at times through the season as an over-age player, being also included in the squad for the annual Viareggio Cup.

=== Torino ===
At the beginning the 2011–12 season, Oduamadi's co-ownership deal between Milan and Genoa was resolved in favour of the former, but he was sent on loan to Serie B club Torino. He ended the season with 11 appearances and three goals.

=== Varese and Brescia ===
For the 2012–13 season, Oduamadi joined Serie B side Varese on another loan deal.

At the start of the 2013–14 campaign, Oduamadi moved to Serie B club Brescia, once again on loan.

On 31 January 2014, Oduamadi rejoined Varese, making his second loan spell.

=== Crotone & Latina ===
On 8 August 2014, Oduamadi was signed by Serie B club Crotone. On 21 January 2015 he was signed by U.S. Latina Calcio.

=== Şanlıurfaspor and back to Milan ===
On 22 July 2015, Oduamadi moved on loan to TFF First League club Şanlıurfaspor for the season. However, the deal was cut short before the end of the summer transfer window and he came to Milan.

=== HJK Helsinki ===
On 22 March 2016, Oduamadi moved to Finnish club HJK Helsinki, on a loan deal set to expire on 31 December. On 26 May 2016, he scored the decisive goal in the Helsinki derby as HJK claimed a 2–1 victory over HIFK.

=== Back to Milan ===
In 2017–18 season, Oduamadi played for Milan Primavera team as an over-age player. He also received call-up from the first team.

=== Later career ===
On 8 October 2021, Oduamadi signed for Serie D club Crema.

== International career ==
At international level, Oduamadi was first capped by Nigeria U-17, when he was at the Pepsi Football Academy. He went on to be called up by Nigeria U-20 to take part in the 2009 FIFA U-20 World Cup, but eventually was cut from the final squad due to an hamstring injury.

Oduamadi made his full international debut for Nigeria against Kenya, on 29 March 2011, featuring as a second-half substitute. Two years later, he made his second appearance against Kenya in a 2014 World Cup qualifying match, where he scored the equalising goal in the 94th minute to level the score.

Oduamadi was selected for Nigeria's squad at the 2013 FIFA Confederations Cup, in which he scored three goals against Tahiti in their opening match.

== Career statistics ==
=== Club ===
As of match played 4 August 2016

Appearances and goals by club, season and competition
Club	Season	League			National cup		League cup		Continental		Other		Total	
Club	Season	Division	Apps	Goals	Apps	Goals	Apps	Goals	Apps	Goals	Apps	Goals	Apps	Goals
AC Milan	2010–11	Serie A	1	0	0	0	–		0	0	–		1	0
AC Milan	2011–12	Serie A	0	0	0	0	–		0	0	–		0	0
AC Milan	2012–13	Serie A	0	0	0	0	–		0	0	–		0	0
AC Milan	2013–14	Serie A	0	0	0	0	–		0	0	–		0	0
AC Milan	2014–15	Serie A	0	0	0	0	–		–		–		0	0
AC Milan	2015–16	Serie A	0	0	0	0	–		–		–		0	0
AC Milan	2016–17	Serie A	0	0	0	0	–		–		–		0	0
AC Milan	2017–18	Serie A	0	0	0	0	–		–		–		0	0
AC Milan	Total		1	0	0	0	0	0	0	0	0	0	1	0
Torino (loan)	2011–12	Serie B	11	3	0	0	–		–		–		11	3
Varese (loan)	2012–13	Serie B	16	2	0	0	–		–		–		16	2
Brescia (loan)	2013–14	Serie B	14	0	2	1	–		–		–		16	1
Varese (loan)	2013–14	Serie B	12	4	0	0	–		–		–		12	4
Crotone (loan)	2014–15	Serie B	12	1	1	0	–		–		–		13	1
Latina (loan)	2014–15	Serie B	16	2	0	0	–		–		–		16	2
Şanlıurfaspor (loan)	2015–16	TFF First League	1	0	0	0	–		–		–		1	0
HJK (loan)	2016	Veikkausliiga	28	7	2	0	0	0	4	0	–		34	7
Career total			111	19	5	1	0	0	4	0	0	0	119	20

=== International ===
Appearances and goals by national team and year
National team	Year	Apps	Goals
Nigeria	2012	1	0
Nigeria	2013	11	4
Nigeria	2014	1	0
Total		13	4

Scores and results list Nigeria's goal tally first, score column indicates score after each Oduamadi goal.

List of international goals scored by Nnamdi Oduamadi
No.	Date	Venue	Opponent	Score	Result	Competition
1	23 March 2013	U. J. Esuene Stadium, Calabar, Nigeria	Kenya	1–1	1–1	2014 FIFA World Cup qualification
2	17 June 2013	Mineirão, Belo Horizonte, Brazil	Tahiti	2–0	6–1	2013 FIFA Confederations Cup
3	17 June 2013	Mineirão, Belo Horizonte, Brazil	Tahiti	3–0	6–1	2013 FIFA Confederations Cup
4	17 June 2013	Mineirão, Belo Horizonte, Brazil	Tahiti	5–1	6–1	2013 FIFA Confederations Cup

== Honours ==
AC Milan

- Serie A: 2010–11
