= Paulinho (footballer, born July 1988) =

Brazilian footballer

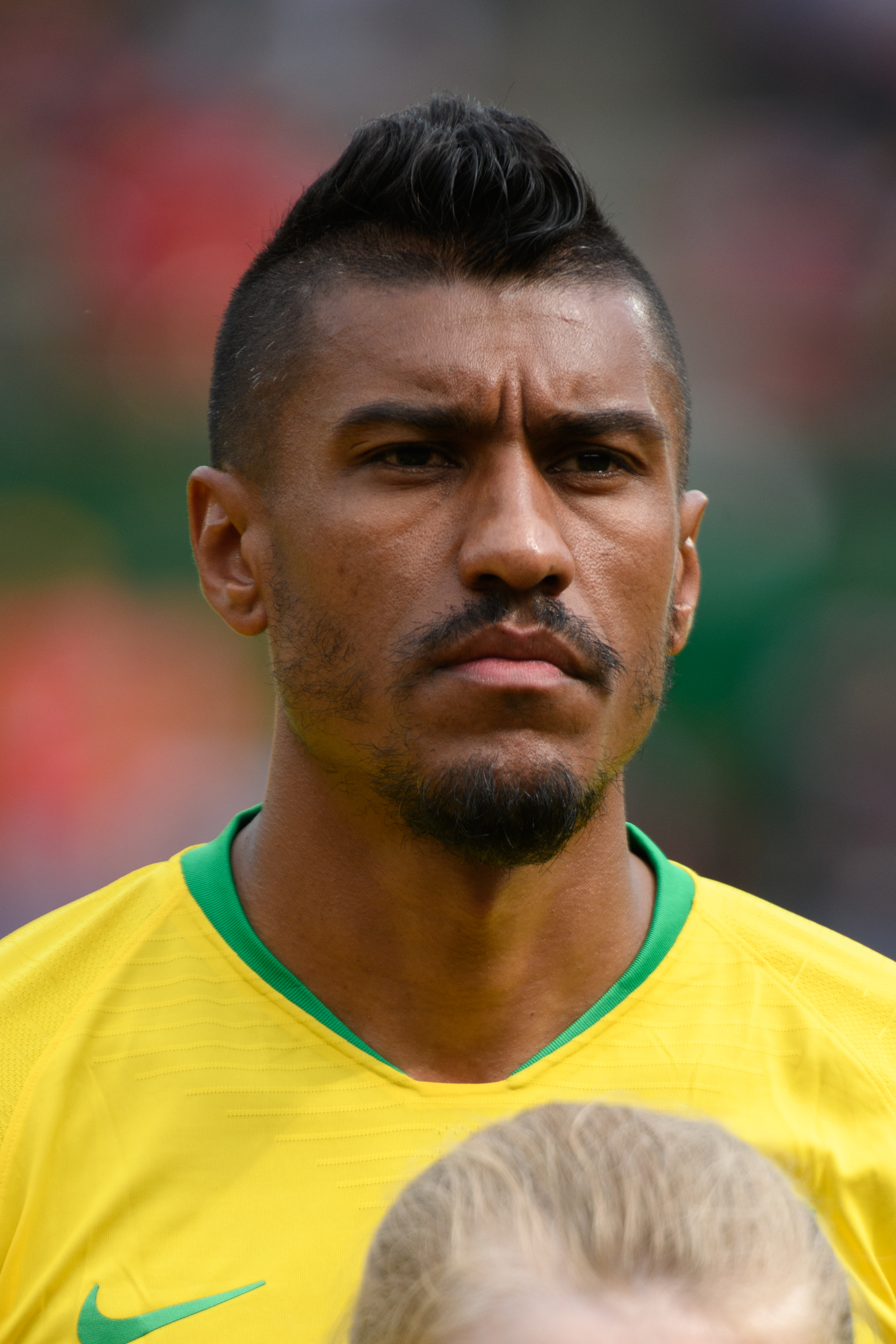
- Paulinho with Brazil in 2018

Personal information
- Full name: José Paulo Bezerra Maciel Júnior
- Date of birth: 25 July 1988 (age 38)
- Place of birth: São Paulo, Brazil
- Height: 1.83 m (6 ft 0 in)
- Position: Midfielder

Youth career
- 2004–2005: Pão de Açúcar

Senior career*
Years	Team	Apps	(Gls)
2006–2010	Pão de Açúcar	39	(7)
2006–2007	→ Vilnius (loan)	38	(5)
2007–2008	→ ŁKS Łódź (loan)	17	(0)
2009–2010	→ Bragantino (loan)	46	(14)
2010–2012	Coimbra	0	(0)
2010–2012	→ Corinthians (loan)	114	(23)
2012–2013	Corinthians	21	(6)
2013–2015	Tottenham Hotspur	45	(6)
2015–2017	Guangzhou Evergrande	63	(17)
2017–2019	Barcelona	34	(9)
2018–2019	→ Guangzhou Evergrande (loan)	19	(13)
2019–2021	Guangzhou Evergrande	49	(31)
2021	Al-Ahli	4	(2)
2022–2024	Corinthians	35	(6)

International career
2011–2018	Brazil	56	(13)
Medal record
Representing Brazil
FIFA Confederations Cup
Winner	2013
- * Club domestic league appearances and goals

José Paulo Bezerra Maciel Júnior (born 25 July 1988), known as Paulinho, is a Brazilian former professional footballer who played as a midfielder. He was known for his physicality, stamina, late attacking runs into the penalty area and ability to contribute both defensively and offensively.

Paulinho began his career in Brazil and had early spells in Lithuania and Poland before establishing himself at Corinthians, where he won the Campeonato Brasileiro Série A, the Copa Libertadores and the FIFA Club World Cup. He later played for Tottenham Hotspur, Guangzhou Evergrande, Barcelona and Al-Ahli, before returning to Corinthians and retiring in 2024. During his time at Barcelona, he won La Liga and the Copa del Rey.

At international level, Paulinho represented the Brazil national team from 2011 to 2018. He was part of the squad that won the 2013 FIFA Confederations Cup and represented Brazil at the 2014 and 2018 FIFA World Cups.

== Club career ==
=== Early career ===
Paulinho began his playing career with Pão de Açúcar, joining the youth squad in 2004. After failing to break through into the first team, Paulinho joined Lithuanian side Vilnius in 2006. He played well for the club during his two seasons in Lithuania, scoring five goals from 38 domestic appearances, but at the end of the 2007 LFF Lyga campaign, Vilnius were relegated to the second division and Paulinho left the club where he moved to Poland, signing for Ekstraklasa side ŁKS Łódź. Following one season in Poland where Paulinho made 17 league appearances, he returned to Brazil and his first club Pão de Açúcar in the summer of 2008. After a single successful season, Paulinho was on the move again, joining Série B side Bragantino in 2009.

=== Corinthians ===
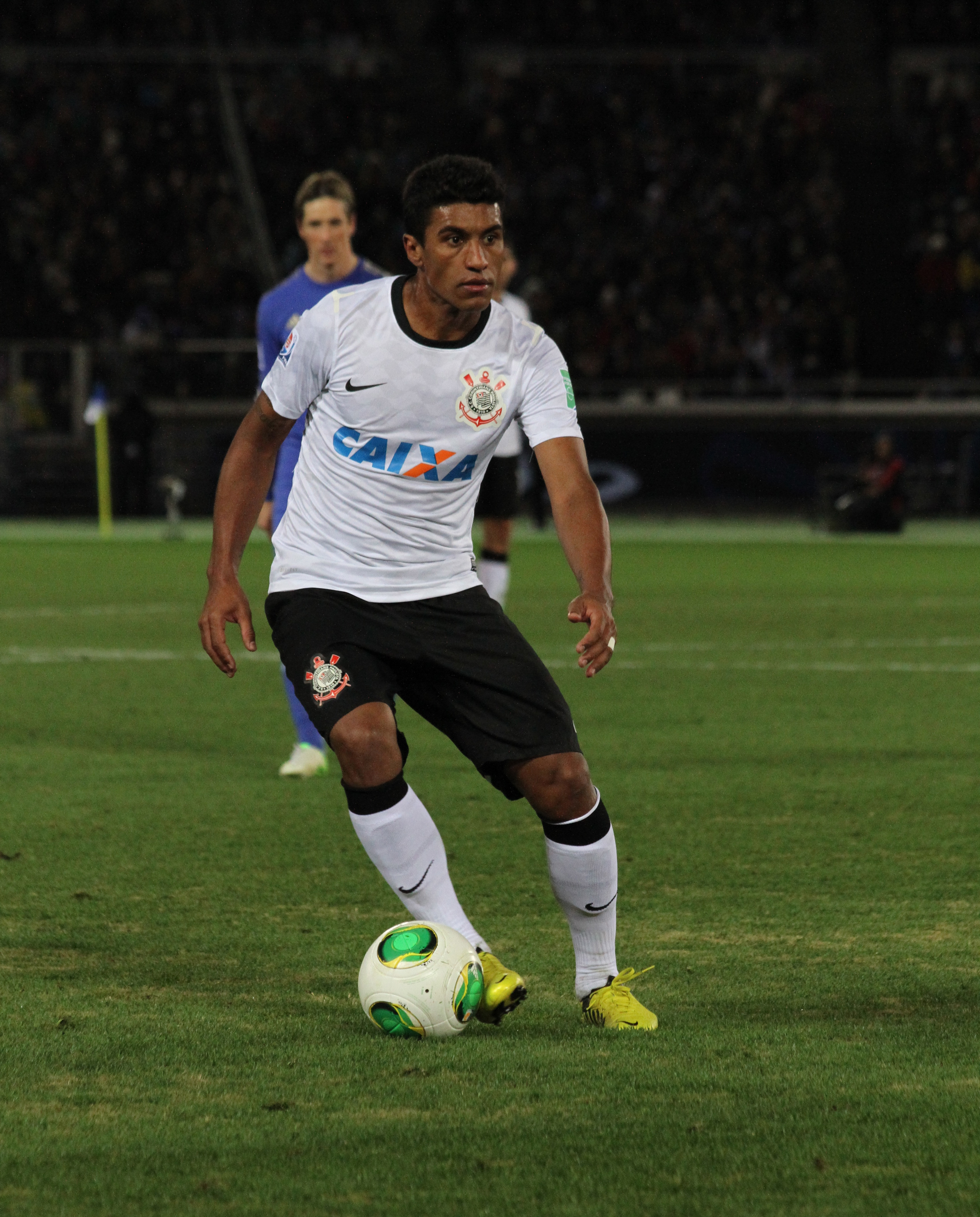
Paulinho playing for Corinthians in 2012

In 2009, playing for Bragantino, he drew the attention of São Paulo giants Corinthians, and was signed by the club. His first league goal for the club came on 30 May 2010, coming off the bench to score Corinthians's fourth goal, sealing a 4–2 win over state rivals Santos. He would eventually go on to win important competitions with the São Paulo side, such as the 2011 Brasileirão and the 2012 Copa Libertadores, cementing himself as a hero for his club. Along the way to the Copa Libertadores final, Paulinho netted the only goal of the two-legged quarter-final tie against fellow Brazilian side Vasco da Gama, scoring in the 87th minute of the second leg on 23 May 2012 to send Corinthians into the semi-finals.

On 10 November 2012, Paulinho struck twice as Corinthians cruised to a 5–1 victory over Coritiba in the 35th round of league play. On 16 December, Paulinho and Corinthians won the Club World Cup in Yokohama as Paolo Guerrero scored the winner in the 1–0 victory over European champions Chelsea.

=== Tottenham Hotspur ===
On 6 July 2013, Premier League club Tottenham Hotspur confirmed the signing of Paulinho after he successfully completed his medical for a fee reported to be just under £17 million. This was the club's record transfer fee at the time. However, in the same transfer window, this record was broken twice with the signings of striker Roberto Soldado from Valencia and winger Erik Lamela from Roma for a deal worth an initial £25.8 million, plus up to £4.2 million in bonus payments. He made his Premier League debut on 18 August 2013 against Crystal Palace, eventually being named Man of the Match in which Tottenham won 1–0 away thanks to a Roberto Soldado penalty. On 22 August, he scored his first goal for the club in a Europa League qualification match against Dinamo Tbilisi, a 5–0 away victory in the first-leg. He scored his first goal for the club in the Premier League on 22 September 2013 against Cardiff City, a 1–0 away victory, with a backheel in the 92nd minute of the game.

=== Guangzhou Evergrande ===
On 30 June 2015, Paulinho joined Chinese Super League side Guangzhou Evergrande for €14 million (£9.9 million), signing a four-year deal. He was signed by his former international manager, Luiz Felipe Scolari. On 11 July 2015, he made his debut in a 2–0 away victory against Changchun Yatai, coming on as a substitute for Yu Hanchao in the 78th minute. On 25 August 2015, Paulinho scored his first goal for Guangzhou with a 35-yard free-kick in the first leg of a 2015 AFC Champions League knock-out stage match against Japanese side Kashiwa Reysol. On 13 December 2015, Paulinho scored a header against Club América in the third and final minute of the added-time in the quarter-final in the 2015 FIFA Club World Cup, making the game 2–1 and putting Evergrande into the semi-final. In January 2017, Paulinho extended his contract with Guangzhou until 31 December 2020.

=== Barcelona ===
On 14 August 2017, Barcelona announced a deal with Guangzhou Evergrande for the purchase of Paulinho for €40 million. According to Guangzhou Evergrande, Barcelona made several unsuccessful bids before activating his release clause. On 26 August 2017, he made his debut for Barcelona in a 2–0 win over Alavés, coming on for Andrés Iniesta in the 87th minute. On 16 September 2017, he scored his first goal for Barcelona in a 2–1 win over Getafe, after coming on for Ivan Rakitić in the 77th minute. On 28 October, Paulinho scored in a 2–0 win against Athletic Bilbao with a 92nd-minute goal. His consistent performance earned him a place as a starter in the squad. Paulinho ended the year with a brace against Deportivo de La Coruña.

On 7 January, in Barcelona's first match of the year, Paulinho scored the third goal in a 3–0 win, scoring in injury time. On 15 January 2018, he scored the first goal in Barcelona's 4–2 win over Real Sociedad at the Anoeta Stadium that ended the club's 10-year long victory drought at the stadium. On 9 May, Paulinho scored the second goal in Barcelona's 5–1 win over Villarreal. Paulinho received praise for his performances throughout the season; becoming one of Barcelona's key players as they won the domestic double. He finished the season with 9 goals in 49 appearances.

=== Return to Guangzhou Evergrande ===
On 8 July 2018, Guangzhou Evergrande re-signed Paulinho on a one-year loan deal. The club also agreed an option to purchase Paulinho after the loan expires. He made his return debut on 18 July, playing the whole match in a 4–0 home win over Guizhou Hengfeng. On 29 July, he scored on his second league match in a 5–0 home win over Chongqing Dangdai Lifan. On 4 January 2019, Guangzhou Evergrande exercised the purchase option and signed Paulinho for €42 million.

On 21 June 2021, Paulinho and Guangzhou parted ways by mutual agreement due to the COVID-19 pandemic.

=== Al-Ahli ===
On 22 July 2021, Paulinho joined Saudi Professional League side Al-Ahli. On 18 September 2021, he terminated his contract with the club, citing "inability to provide the desired addition to the team" as the reason.

=== Return to Corinthians ===
On 1 January 2022, Paulinho returned to Série A club Corinthians on a free transfer. His second spell at the club was hindered by injuries, with Paulinho undergoing two ACL reconstruction surgeries in the span of a year. He made 51 appearances and scored six goals across all competitions and left the club on mutual agreement in May 2024.

=== Retirement ===
On 8 September 2024, Paulinho announced his retirement from professional football.

== International career ==
=== Early career ===
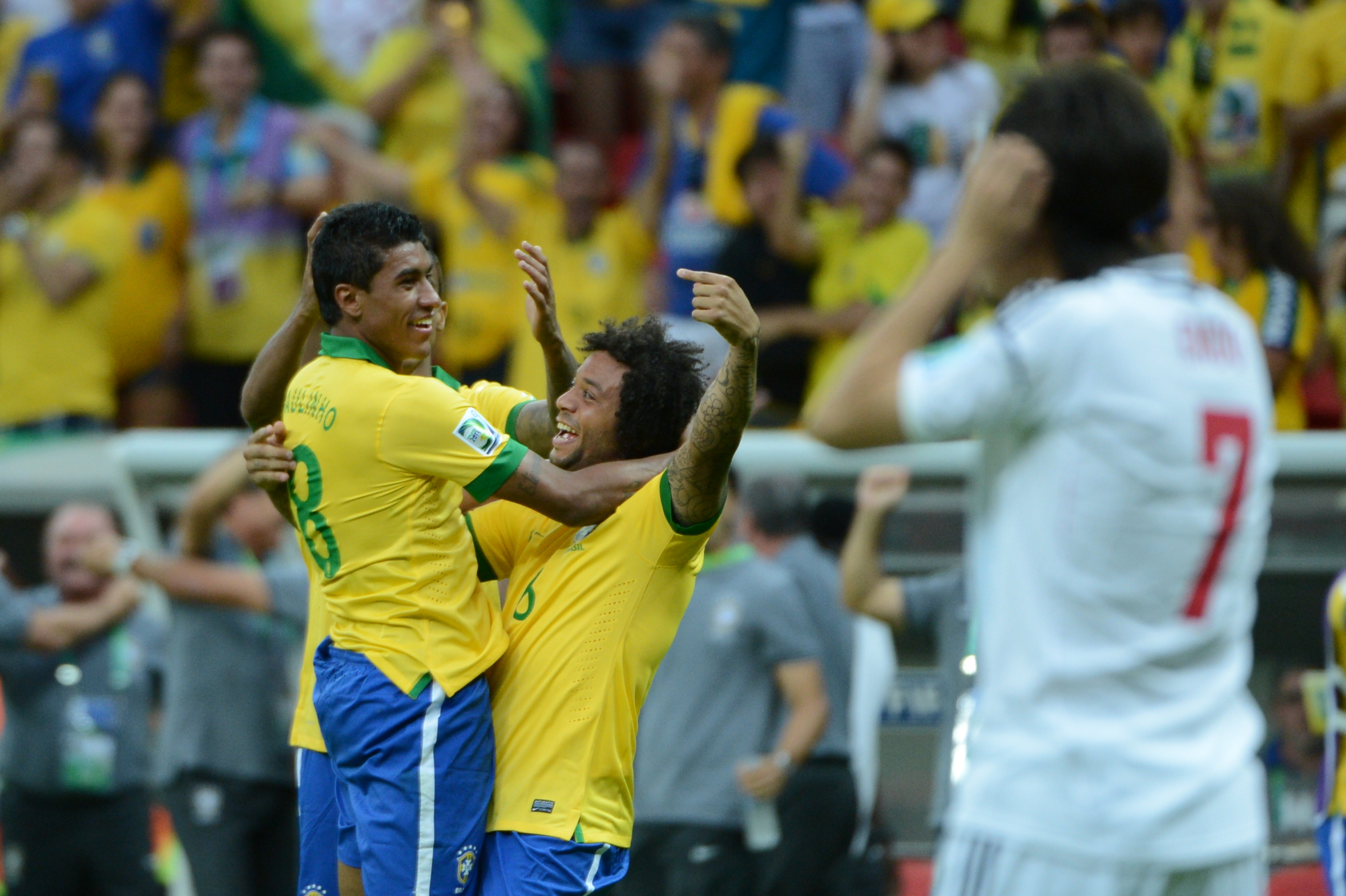
Paulinho joined celebrations during 2013 FIFA Confederations Cup.

Paulinho made his debut for the Seleção on 14 September 2011 in the first leg of the 2011 Superclásico de las Américas against rivals Argentina in Córdoba, with the game ending in a goalless draw. His first goal for his international side came against Argentina a year later on 20 September 2012, when he netted Brazil's equalizing goal in an eventual 2–1 in the first leg of the 2012 Superclásico de las Américas.

=== 2013 Confederations Cup ===
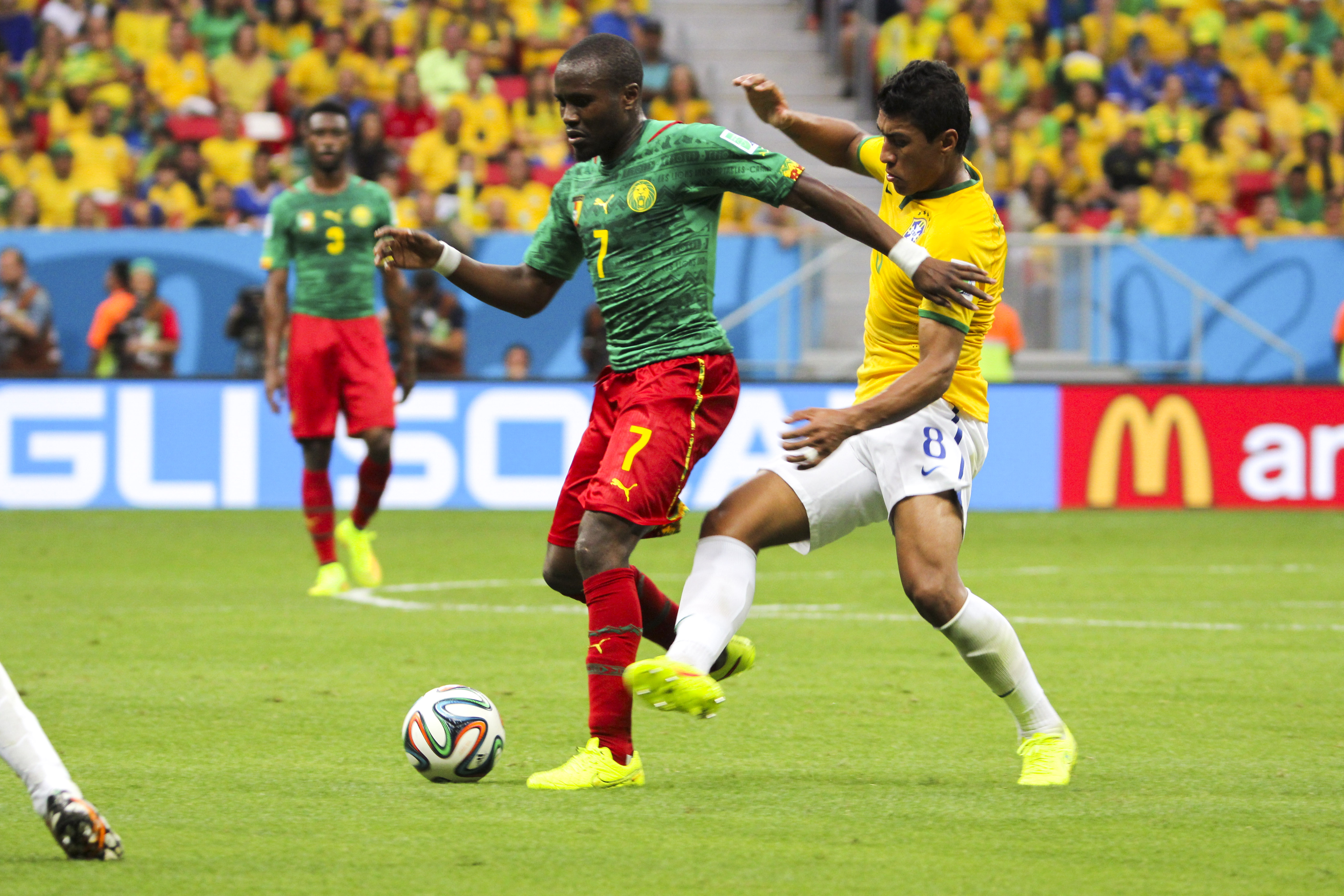
Paulinho battles Cameroon midfielder Landry N'Guémo for the ball during the 2014 FIFA World Cup on 23 June.

Paulinho was selected by Luiz Felipe Scolari for the 23-man Brazil squad for the 2013 FIFA Confederations Cup held in his home country. In Brazil's second to last final warm-up match for the competition against England at the Maracanã on 2 June 2013, Paulinho volleyed home Lucas Moura's cross to level the game late on at 2–2; the sides would finish level on this same scoreline. In the opening group match on 15 June against Japan, Paulinho scored Brazil's second goal in a 3–0 victory. In the semi-final round against Uruguay on 26 June, Paulinho netted in the 86th minute to give Brazil a 2–1 win and book the host country a spot in the final. In the final, Brazil outclassed Spain, beating the World and two-time defending European champions by a score of 3–0. For his efforts throughout the tournament, Paulinho received the Bronze Ball as the competition's third best player.

=== 2014 World Cup ===
Paulinho started in Brazil's 5–0 friendly win against South Africa on 5 March 2014. On 2 June, he was named in manager Scolari's 23-man squad that would participate at the 2014 World Cup on home soil. On 8 July, he appeared as a second-half substitute in the 7–1 semi-final defeat to eventual champions Germany. Four days later, he started in the bronze medal match against the Netherlands, which ended in a 3–0 loss.

=== 2018 World Cup ===
In the qualifiers for the 2018 World Cup Paulinho scored his first ever career hat-trick in a match away against Uruguay. Brazil had initially gone behind but came back for their first time anyone had won in Uruguay since the qualifying round had started. In May 2018 he was named in Tite's final 23 man squad for the 2018 FIFA World Cup in Russia. On 27 June, he scored in Brazil's final group match, a 2–0 win over Serbia, to send his team through to the knock-out stages of the competition.

== Style of play ==
A quick, hard-working, and energetic midfielder, Paulinho was most often described as a box-to-box midfielder. Primarily a central midfielder, he was capable of playing in several midfield roles and was also used as a defensive midfielder. His style of play combined physical strength, stamina, ball-winning ability, off-the-ball movement, and late attacking runs into the penalty area from deeper positions.

== Career statistics ==
=== Club ===
Appearances and goals by club, season and competition
Club	Season	League			State League		Cup		Continental		Other		Total	
Club	Season	Division	Apps	Goals	Apps	Goals	Apps	Goals	Apps	Goals	Apps	Goals	Apps	Goals
Pão de Açúcar	2008	Paulista 2ª Divisão	—		19 (Note: Appearances in Campeonato Paulista Segunda Divisão)	1	—		—		—		19	1
Pão de Açúcar	2009	Paulista A3	—		20 (Note: Appearances in Campeonato Paulista Série A3)	6	—		—		—		20	6
Pão de Açúcar	Total		—		39	7	—		—		—		39	7
Vilnius (loan)	2006	A Lyga	17	2	—		—		—		—		17	2
Vilnius (loan)	2007	A Lyga	21	3	—		—		—		—		21	3
Vilnius (loan)	Total		38	5	—		—		—		—		38	5
Łódź (loan)	2007–08	Ekstraklasa	17	0	—		5 (Note: One appearance and one goal in Polish Cup, four appearances in Ekstraklasa Cup)	1	—		—		22	1
Bragantino (loan)	2009	Série B	28	6	—		—		—		—		28	6
Bragantino (loan)	2010	Série B	0	0	18 (Note: Appearances in Campeonato Paulista)	8	—		—		—		18	8
Bragantino (loan)	Total		28	6	18	8	—		—		—		46	14
Coimbra	2010	Mineiro 2ª Divisão	—		0	0	—		—		—		0	0
Corinthians (loan)	2010	Série A	27	4	—		—		1 (Note: Appearances in Copa Libertadores)	0	—		28	4
Corinthians (loan)	2011	Série A	35	8	20	3	—		1	0	—		56	11
Corinthians (loan)	2012	Série A	23	7	13	3	—		14	3	2 (Note: Appearances in FIFA Club World Cup)	0	52	13
Corinthians	2013	Série A	1	1	16	3	—		8	2	—		25	6
Corinthians	Total		86	20	49	9	—		24	5	2	0	161	34
Tottenham Hotspur	2013–14	Premier League	30	6	—		2	1	5 (Note: Appearances in UEFA Europa League)	1	—		37	8
Tottenham Hotspur	2014–15	Premier League	15	0	—		7 (Note: Three appearances and one goal in FA Cup, four appearances in Football League Cup)	1	8	1	—		30	2
Tottenham Hotspur	Total		45	6	—		9	2	13	2	—		67	10
Guangzhou Evergrande	2015	Chinese Super League	13	2	—		0	0	6 (Note: Appearances in AFC Champions League)	1	3	2	22	5
Guangzhou Evergrande	2016	Chinese Super League	30	8	—		8	3	5	0	1 (Note: Appearances in Chinese FA Super Cup)	0	44	11
Guangzhou Evergrande	2017	Chinese Super League	20	7	—		0	0	8	5	1	0	29	12
Guangzhou Evergrande	Total		63	17	—		8	3	19	6	5	2	95	28
Barcelona	2017–18	La Liga	34	9	—		6	0	9 (Note: Appearances in UEFA Champions League)	0	0	0	49	9
Guangzhou Evergrande	2018	Chinese Super League	19	13	—		0	0	0	0	0	0	19	13
Guangzhou Evergrande	2019	Chinese Super League	29	19	—		1	0	12	3	—		42	22
Guangzhou Evergrande	2020	Chinese Super League	20	12	—		0	0	0	0	—		20	12
Guangzhou Evergrande	Total		68	44	—		1	0	12	3	0	0	81	47
Al-Ahli	2021–22	Saudi Professional League	4	2	—		0	0	—		—		4	2
Corinthians	2022	Série A	3	1	14	3	0	0	3	0	—		20	4
Corinthians	2023	Série A	4	0	8	2	3	0	4	0	—		19	2
Corinthians	2024	Série A	6	0	0	0	2	0	4 (Note: Appearances in Copa Sudamericana)	0	—		12	0
Corinthians	Total		13	1	22	5	5	0	11	0	—		51	6
Career total			396	110	128	29	34	6	88	16	7	2	653	163

=== International ===
Appearances and goals by national team and year
National team	Year	Apps	Goals
Brazil	2011	1	0
Brazil	2012	7	2
Brazil	2013	16	3
Brazil	2014	8	0
Brazil	2015	0	0
Brazil	2016	5	1
Brazil	2017	9	5
Brazil	2018	10	2
Total		56	13

Scores and results list Brazil's goal tally first, score column indicates score after each Paulinho goal.

List of international goals scored by Paulinho
No.	Date	Venue	Opponent	Score	Result	Competition
1	19 September 2012	Estádio Serra Dourada, Goiânia, Brazil	Argentina	1–1	2–1	2012 Superclásico de las Américas
2	16 October 2012	Stadion Miejski, Wrocław, Poland	Japan	1–0	4–0	Friendly
3	2 June 2013	Estádio do Maracanã, Rio de Janeiro, Brazil	England	2–2	2–2	Friendly
4	15 June 2013	Estádio Nacional Mané Garrincha, Brasília, Brazil	Japan	2–0	3–0	2013 FIFA Confederations Cup
5	26 June 2013	Estádio Mineirão, Belo Horizonte, Brazil	Uruguay	2–1	2–1	2013 FIFA Confederations Cup
6	10 November 2016	Estádio Mineirão, Belo Horizonte, Brazil	Argentina	3–0	3–0	2018 FIFA World Cup qualification
7	23 March 2017	Estadio Centenario, Montevideo, Uruguay	Uruguay	1–1	4–1	2018 FIFA World Cup qualification
8	23 March 2017	Estadio Centenario, Montevideo, Uruguay	Uruguay	2–1	4–1	2018 FIFA World Cup qualification
9	23 March 2017	Estadio Centenario, Montevideo, Uruguay	Uruguay	4–1	4–1	2018 FIFA World Cup qualification
10	31 August 2017	Arena do Grêmio, Porto Alegre, Brazil	Ecuador	1–0	2–0	2018 FIFA World Cup qualification
11	10 October 2017	Allianz Parque, São Paulo, Brazil	Chile	1–0	3–0	2018 FIFA World Cup qualification
12	23 March 2018	Luzhniki Stadium, Moscow, Russia	Russia	3–0	3–0	Friendly
13	27 June 2018	Otkritie Arena, Moscow, Russia	Serbia	1–0	2–0	2018 FIFA World Cup

== Honours ==
Audax

- Campeonato Paulista Série A4: 2008

Corinthians

- Campeonato Brasileiro Série A: 2011
- Campeonato Paulista: 2013
- Recopa Sudamericana: 2013
- Copa Libertadores: 2012
- FIFA Club World Cup: 2012

Guangzhou Evergrande

- Chinese Super League: 2015, 2016, 2017, 2019
- Chinese FA Cup: 2016
- Chinese FA Super Cup: 2016, 2017
- AFC Champions League: 2015

Barcelona

- La Liga: 2017–18
- Copa del Rey: 2017–18

Brazil

- FIFA Confederations Cup: 2013

Individual

- Campeonato Brasileiro Série A Team of the Year: 2011, 2012
- Bola de Prata: 2011, 2012
- FIFA Confederations Cup Bronze Ball: 2013
- FIFA Confederations Cup Dream Team: 2013
- Chinese Super League Team of the Year: 2016, 2018, 2019
- Chinese Super League MVP: 2019
