= 2013 FIFA Confederations Cup =

9th FIFA Confederations Cup, held in Brazil

Copa das Confederações da FIFA Brasil 2013 (Note: The standard Brazilian Portuguese pronunciation is [ˈkɔpɐ das kõfedeɾaˈsõjz da ˈfifɐ bɾaˈziw ˈdojz ˈmiw i ˈtɾezi].)

Tournament details
- Host country: Brazil
- Dates: 15–30 June
- Teams: 8 (from 6 confederations)
- Venues: 6 (in 6 host cities)

Final positions
- Champions: Brazil (4th title)
- Runners-up: Spain
- Third place: Italy
- Fourth place: Uruguay

Tournament statistics
- Matches played: 16
- Goals scored: 68 (4.25 per match)
- Attendance: 804,659 (50,291 per match)
- Top scorer(s): (Brazil) Fred (Spain) Fernando Torres (5 goals each)
- Best player: (Brazil) Neymar
- Best goalkeeper: (Brazil) Júlio César
- Fair play award: Spain

The 2013 FIFA Confederations Cup was the ninth FIFA Confederations Cup, which was held in Brazil from 15 to 30 June 2013 as a prelude to the 2014 FIFA World Cup. The most recent winners of the six continental championships appeared in the tournament, along with hosts Brazil and UEFA Euro 2012 runners-up Italy, who qualified because the Euro 2012 winners, Spain, had also won the most recent FIFA World Cup in 2010 thus securing a spot in the tournament.

The two-time defending champion and host nation Brazil successfully defended their title with a 3–0 win over Spain in the final. It was their fourth Confederations Cup title and third in a row, after previous wins in 1997, 2005 and 2009.

According to then FIFA president Sepp Blatter, the 2013 FIFA Confederations Cup was the best version of the tournament ever played. The competition was the first national team tournament to employ goal-line technology, which was also used at the 2014 World Cup.

== Qualified teams ==
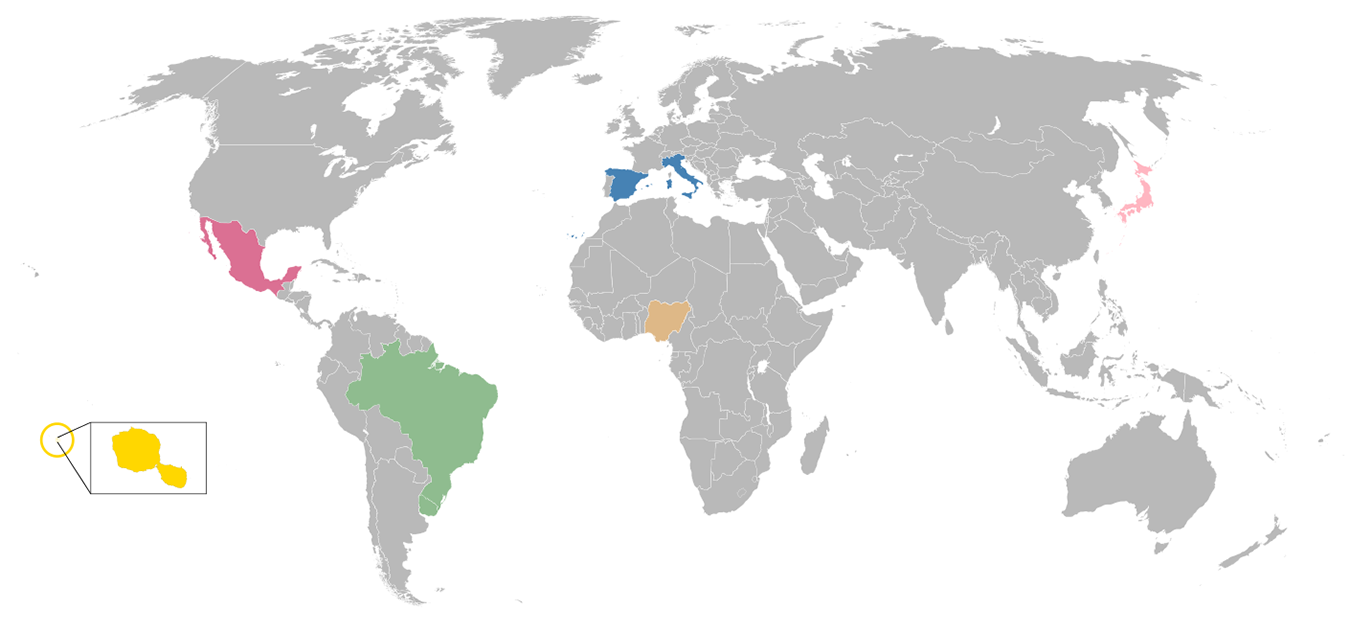
2013 FIFA Confederations Cup participating teams

Team	Confederation	Qualification method	Date qualification secured	Participation no.
Brazil	CONMEBOL	Hosts	30 October 2007	7th
Spain	UEFA	2010 FIFA World Cup winners	11 July 2010	2nd
Japan	AFC	2011 AFC Asian Cup winners	29 January 2011	5th
Mexico	CONCACAF	2011 CONCACAF Gold Cup winners	25 June 2011	6th
Uruguay	CONMEBOL	2011 Copa América winners	24 July 2011	2nd
Tahiti	OFC	2012 OFC Nations Cup winners	10 June 2012	1st
Italy	UEFA	UEFA Euro 2012 runners-up (Note: Italy was awarded a spot in the competition because Spain had won both the 2010 FIFA World Cup and UEFA Euro 2012. Since both competitions award their winners a place in the FIFA Confederations Cup, the runner-up of UEFA Euro 2012 received an invitation to the tournament.)	28 June 2012	2nd
Nigeria	CAF	2013 Africa Cup of Nations winners	10 February 2013	2nd

== Venues ==
Six stadiums were used, each in a different city.

Rio de Janeiro	Location of the host cities of the 2013 FIFA Confederations Cup.	Brasília
Estádio do Maracanã	Location of the host cities of the 2013 FIFA Confederations Cup.	Estádio Nacional
Capacity: 76,804	Location of the host cities of the 2013 FIFA Confederations Cup.	Capacity: 68,009
Fortaleza	Location of the host cities of the 2013 FIFA Confederations Cup.	Belo Horizonte
Estádio Castelão	Location of the host cities of the 2013 FIFA Confederations Cup.	Estádio Mineirão
Capacity: 64,846	Location of the host cities of the 2013 FIFA Confederations Cup.	Capacity: 62,547
Salvador	Location of the host cities of the 2013 FIFA Confederations Cup.	Recife
Arena Fonte Nova	Location of the host cities of the 2013 FIFA Confederations Cup.	Arena Pernambuco
Capacity: 52,048	Location of the host cities of the 2013 FIFA Confederations Cup.	Capacity: 44,248

== Draw ==
The draw for the competition was held at the Palácio das Convenções in the Anhembi Convention Center in São Paulo, Brazil on 1 December 2012.

Teams from the same confederation were not drawn into the same group, therefore, one team each from UEFA and from CONMEBOL was drawn in each group. Brazil and Spain had automatically been assigned as A1 and B1 respectively, therefore, Italy and Uruguay were assigned respectively to Group A and Group B.

== Match officials ==
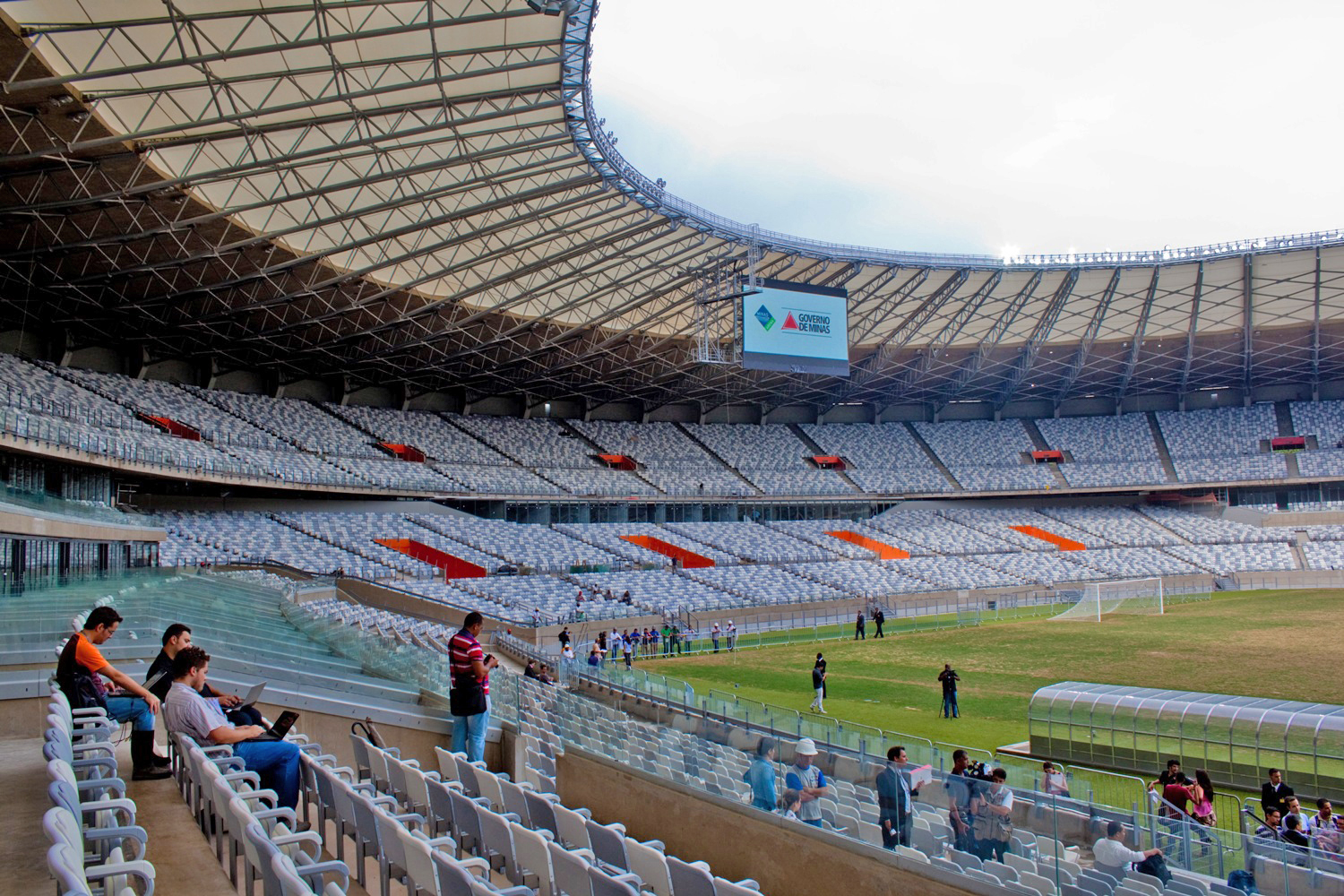
Internal view of the stadium in Belo Horizonte.

Ten trios of officials were announced by FIFA on 13 May 2013.

Confederation	Referee	Assistants
AFC	Yuichi Nishimura (Japan)	Toru Sagara (Japan); Toshiyuki Nagi (Japan)
AFC	Ravshan Irmatov (Uzbekistan)	Abduxamidullo Rasulov (Uzbekistan); Bakhadyr Kochkarov (Kyrgyzstan)
CAF	Djamel Haimoudi (Algeria)	Redouane Achik (Morocco); Abdelhak Etchiali (Algeria)
CONCACAF	Joel Aguilar (El Salvador)	William Torres (El Salvador); Juan Zumba (El Salvador)
CONMEBOL	Diego Abal (Argentina)	Hernán Maidana (Argentina); Juan Pablo Belatti (Argentina)
CONMEBOL	Enrique Osses (Chile)	Carlos Astroza (Chile); Sergio Román (Chile)
UEFA	Howard Webb (England)	Michael Mullarkey (England); Darren Cann (England)
UEFA	Felix Brych (Germany)	Mark Borsch (Germany); Stefan Lupp (Germany)
UEFA	Björn Kuipers (Netherlands)	Sander van Roekel (Netherlands); Erwin Zeinstra (Netherlands)
UEFA	Pedro Proença (Portugal)	Bertino Miranda (Portugal); José Trigo (Portugal)

== Squads ==
Teams had to name a 23-man squad (three of whom must be goalkeepers) by the FIFA deadline of 3 June 2013. The squads were announced by FIFA on 7 June 2013.

== Group stage ==
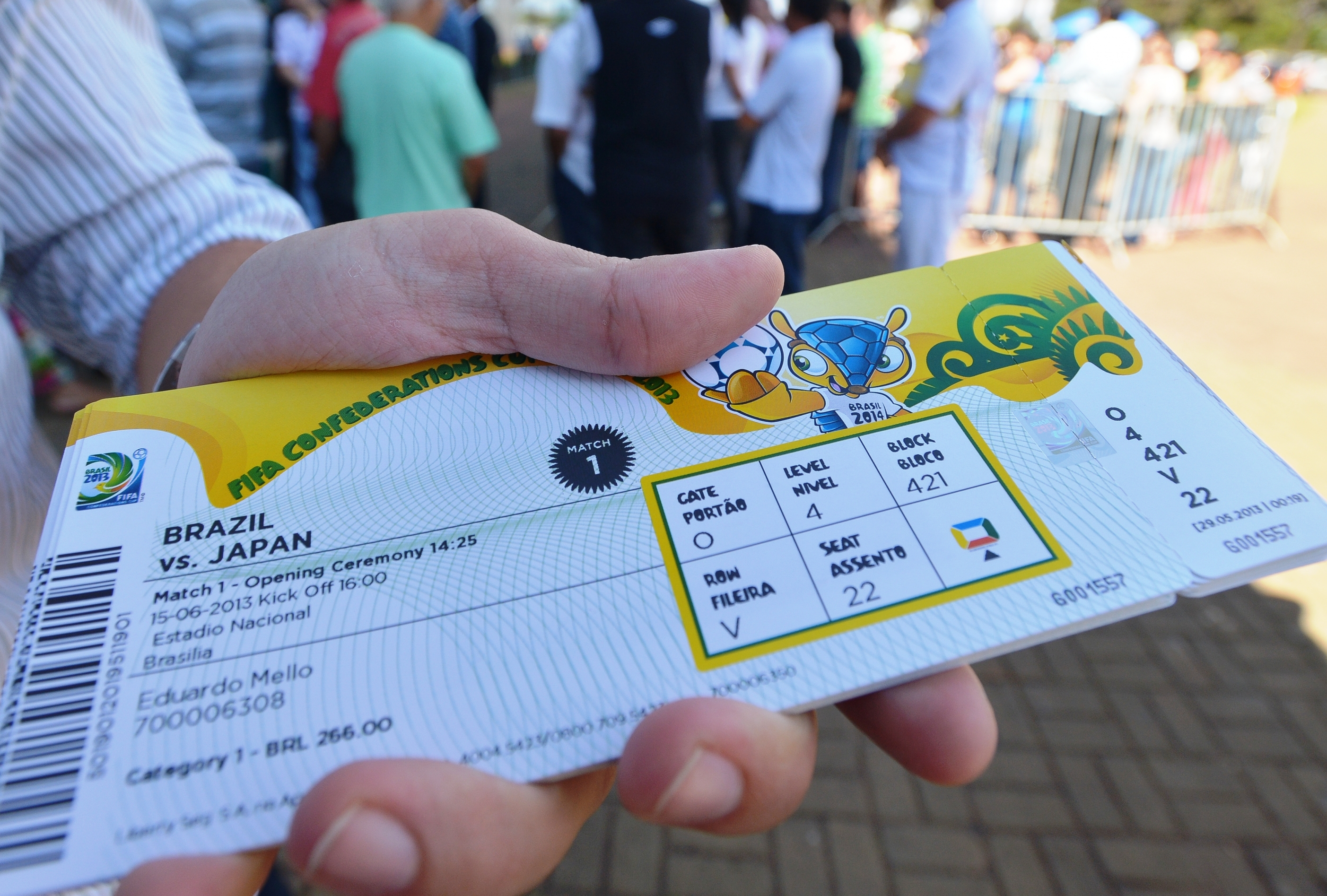
A ticket for the competition's opening match in Brasília

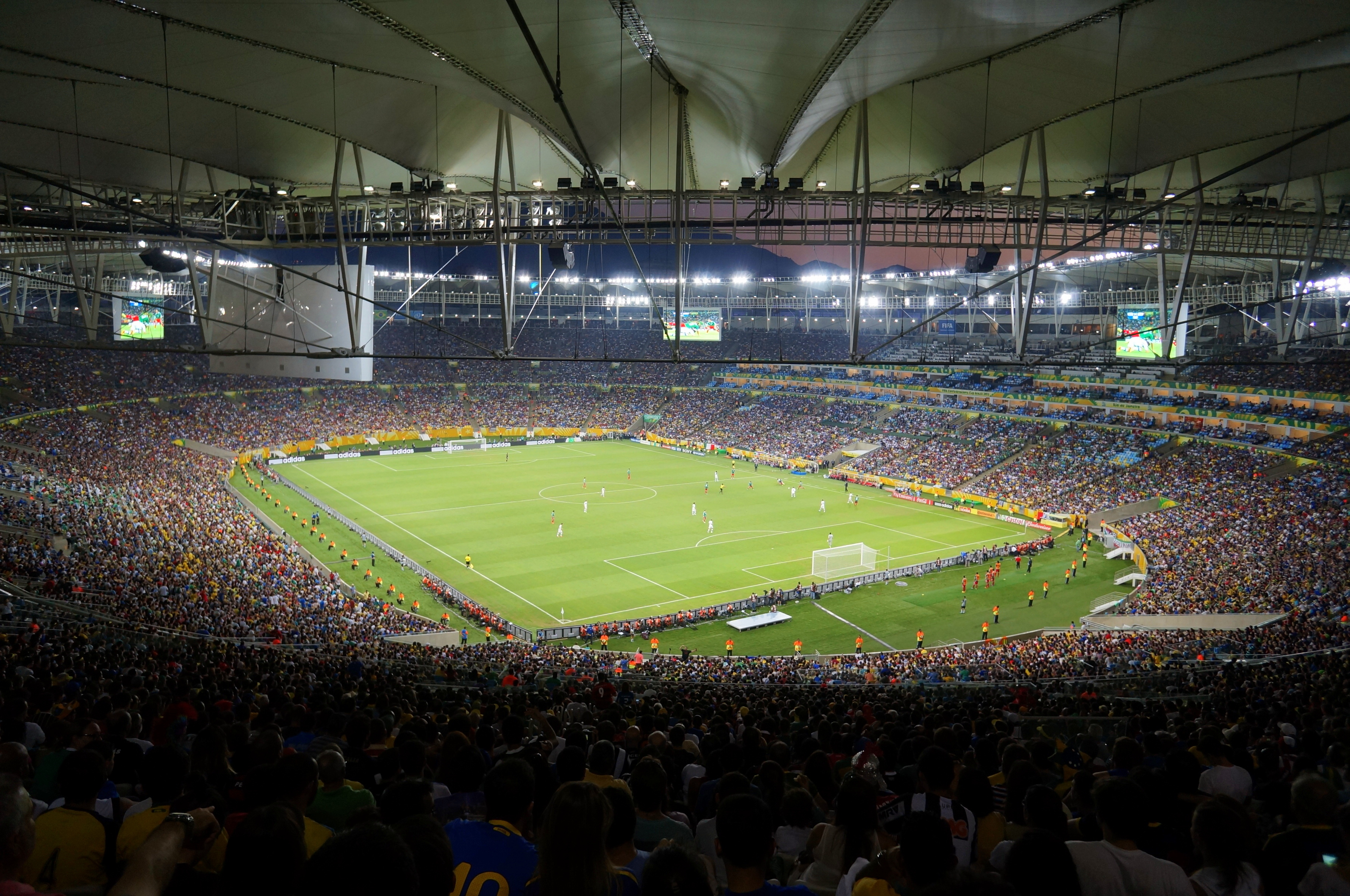
The iconic Maracanã Stadium

The competition's dates were confirmed by FIFA on 27 July 2011 in the build-up to the draw for the 2014 World Cup's preliminary qualification rounds. As the competition partially overlapped with the fourth round of the 2014 FIFA World Cup qualification in Asian zone, the Asian Football Confederation (AFC) asked FIFA to consider a change of date. However, the AFC decided that the match day would only be adjusted for the AFC representative at the Confederations Cup, Japan. The official final schedule was presented in Rio de Janeiro on 30 May 2012.

All times listed are Brasília official time (UTC−03:00).

All eight teams entered the group stage. The group winners and runners-up advanced to the semi-finals, while the bottom two teams in each group were eliminated from the tournament. The ranking of the teams in each group was determined as follows:

1. Points obtained in all group matches;
2. Goal difference in all group matches;
3. Number of goals scored in all group matches;

If two or more teams were equal on the basis of the above three criteria, their rankings were determined as follows:

1. Points obtained in the group matches between the teams concerned;
2. Goal difference in the group matches between the teams concerned;
3. Number of goals scored in the group matches between the teams concerned;
4. Drawing of lots by the FIFA Organising Committee.

Key to colours in group tables
Team has qualified for the semi-finals

=== Group A ===
Pos	Team	Pld	W	D	L	GF	GA	GD	Pts	Qualification
1	Brazil (H)	3	3	0	0	9	2	+7	9	Advance to knockout stage
2	Italy	3	2	0	1	8	8	0	6	Advance to knockout stage
3	Mexico	3	1	0	2	3	5	−2	3	
4	Japan	3	0	0	3	4	9	−5	0	

Source: FIFA
(H) Hosts
15 June 2013
16:00

Brazil	3–0	Japan
Neymar 3'; Paulinho 48'; Jô 90+3'	Report

Estádio Nacional Mané Garrincha, Brasília
Attendance: 67,423
Referee: Pedro Proença (Portugal)
16 June 2013
16:00

Mexico	1–2	Italy
Hernández 34' (pen.)	Report	Pirlo 27'; Balotelli 78'

Estádio do Maracanã, Rio de Janeiro
Attendance: 73,123
Referee: Enrique Osses (Chile)

19 June 2013
16:00

Brazil	2–0	Mexico
Neymar 9'; Jô 90+3'	Report

Estádio Castelão, Fortaleza
Attendance: 57,804
Referee: Howard Webb (England)
19 June 2013
19:00

Italy	4–3	Japan
De Rossi 41'; Uchida 50' (o.g.); Balotelli 52' (pen.); Giovinco 86'	Report	Honda 21' (pen.); Kagawa 33'; Okazaki 69'

Itaipava Arena Pernambuco, Recife
Attendance: 40,489
Referee: Diego Abal (Argentina)

22 June 2013
16:00

Italy	2–4	Brazil
Giaccherini 51'; Chiellini 71'	Report	Dante 45+1'; Neymar 55'; Fred 66', 89'

Itaipava Arena Fonte Nova, Salvador
Attendance: 48,874
Referee: Ravshan Irmatov (Uzbekistan)
22 June 2013
16:00

Japan	1–2	Mexico
Okazaki 86'	Report	Hernández 54', 66'

Estádio Mineirão, Belo Horizonte
Attendance: 52,690
Referee: Felix Brych (Germany)

=== Group B ===
Pos	Team	Pld	W	D	L	GF	GA	GD	Pts	Qualification
1	Spain	3	3	0	0	15	1	+14	9	Advance to knockout stage
2	Uruguay	3	2	0	1	11	3	+8	6	Advance to knockout stage
3	Nigeria	3	1	0	2	7	6	+1	3	
4	Tahiti	3	0	0	3	1	24	−23	0	

Source: FIFA
16 June 2013
19:00

Spain	2–1	Uruguay
Pedro 20'; Soldado 32'	Report	Suárez 88'

Itaipava Arena Pernambuco, Recife
Attendance: 41,705
Referee: Yuichi Nishimura (Japan)
17 June 2013
19:00

Tahiti	1–6	Nigeria
J. Tehau 54'	Report	Vallar 5' (o.g.); Oduamadi 10', 26', 76'; J. Tehau 69' (o.g.); Echiéjilé 80'

Estádio Mineirão, Belo Horizonte
Attendance: 20,187
Referee: Joel Aguilar (El Salvador)

20 June 2013
16:00

Spain	10–0	Tahiti
Torres 5', 33', 57', 78'; Silva 31', 89'; Villa 39', 49', 64'; Mata 66'	Report

Estádio do Maracanã, Rio de Janeiro
Attendance: 71,806
Referee: Djamel Haimoudi (Algeria)
20 June 2013
19:00

Nigeria	1–2	Uruguay
Mikel 37'	Report	Lugano 19'; Forlán 51'

Itaipava Arena Fonte Nova, Salvador
Attendance: 26,769
Referee: Björn Kuipers (Netherlands)

23 June 2013
16:00

Nigeria	0–3	Spain
	Report	Alba 3', 88'; Torres 62'

Estádio Castelão, Fortaleza
Attendance: 51,263
Referee: Joel Aguilar (El Salvador)
23 June 2013
16:00

Uruguay	8–0	Tahiti
Hernández 2', 24', 45+1', 67' (pen.); Pérez 27'; Lodeiro 61'; Suárez 82', 90'	Report

Itaipava Arena Pernambuco, Recife
Attendance: 22,047
Referee: Pedro Proença (Portugal)

== Knockout stage ==
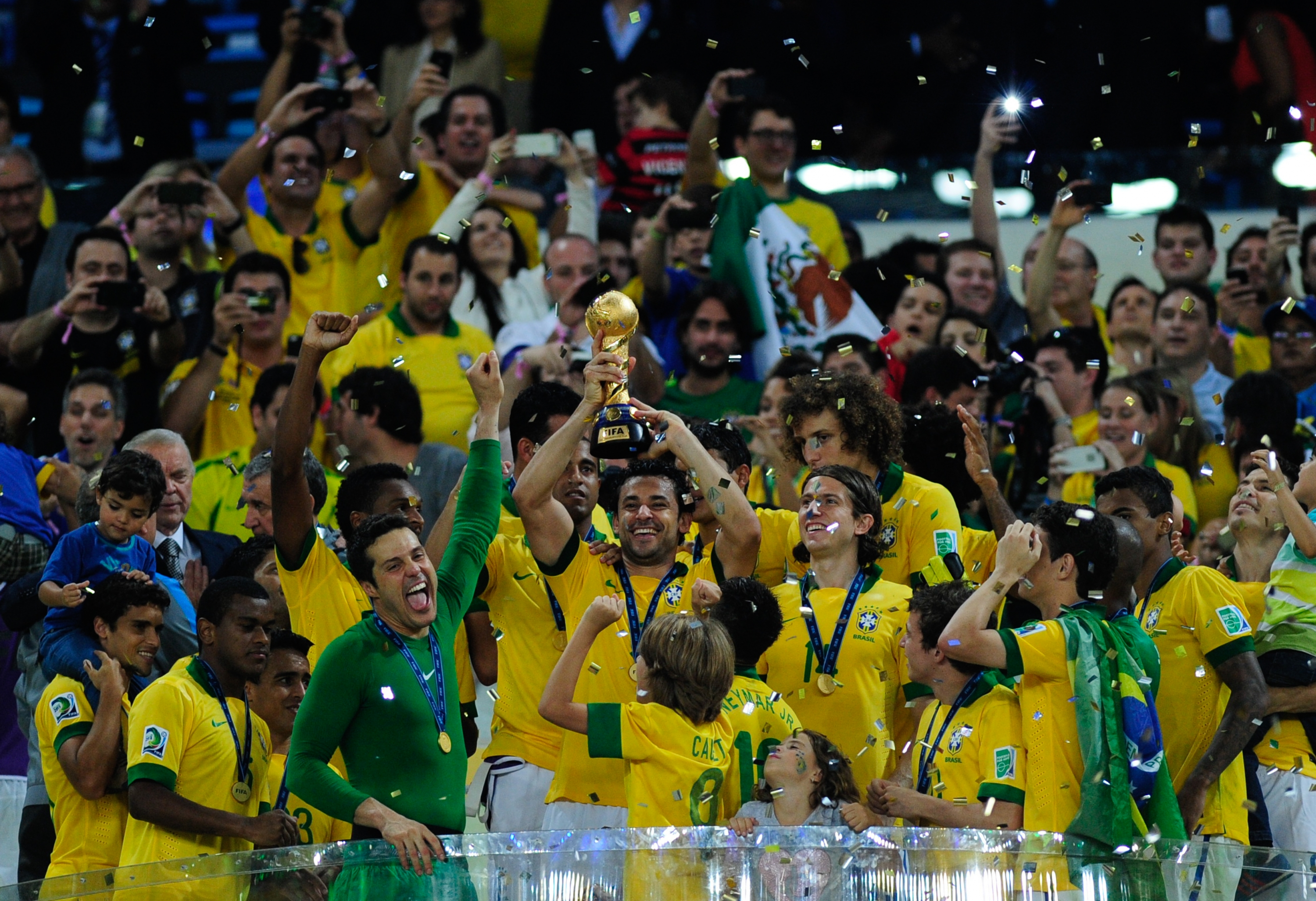
Brazil won the competition after beating Spain 3–0 in the final.

In the knockout stage, if a match was level at the end of normal playing time, extra time would be played (two periods of 15 minutes each) and followed, if necessary, by a penalty shoot-out to determine the winner.

=== Bracket ===
Semi-finals
26 June – Belo Horizonte
Brazil	2
Uruguay	1
27 June – Fortaleza
Spain (p)	0 (7)
Italy	0 (6)

Final
30 June – Rio de Janeiro
Brazil	3
Spain	0
Third place play-off
30 June – Salvador
Uruguay	2 (2)
Italy (p)	2 (3)

=== Semi-finals ===
26 June 2013
16:00

Brazil	2–1	Uruguay
Fred 41'; Paulinho 86'	Report	Cavani 48'

Estádio Mineirão, Belo Horizonte
Attendance: 57,483
Referee: Enrique Osses (Chile)

27 June 2013
16:00

Spain	0–0 (a.e.t.)	Italy
	Report
Penalties
Xavi (penalty scored); Iniesta (penalty scored); Piqué (penalty scored); Ramos (penalty scored); Mata (penalty scored); Busquets (penalty scored); Navas (penalty scored)	7–6	(penalty scored) Candreva; (penalty scored) Aquilani; (penalty scored) De Rossi; (penalty scored) Giovinco; (penalty scored) Pirlo; (penalty scored) Montolivo; (penalty missed) Bonucci

Estádio Castelão, Fortaleza
Attendance: 56,083
Referee: Howard Webb (England)

=== Third place play-off ===
30 June 2013
13:00

Uruguay	2–2 (a.e.t.)	Italy
Cavani 58', 78'	Report	Astori 24'; Diamanti 73'
Penalties
Forlán (penalty missed); Cavani (penalty scored); Suárez (penalty scored); Cáceres (penalty missed); Gargano (penalty missed)	2–3	(penalty scored) Aquilani; (penalty scored) El Shaarawy; (penalty missed) De Sciglio; (penalty scored) Giaccherini

Itaipava Arena Fonte Nova, Salvador
Attendance: 43,382
Referee: Djamel Haimoudi (Algeria)

=== Final ===
30 June 2013
19:00

Brazil	3–0	Spain
Fred 2', 48'; Neymar 44'	Report

Estádio do Maracanã, Rio de Janeiro
Attendance: 73,531
Referee: Björn Kuipers (Netherlands)

== Awards ==
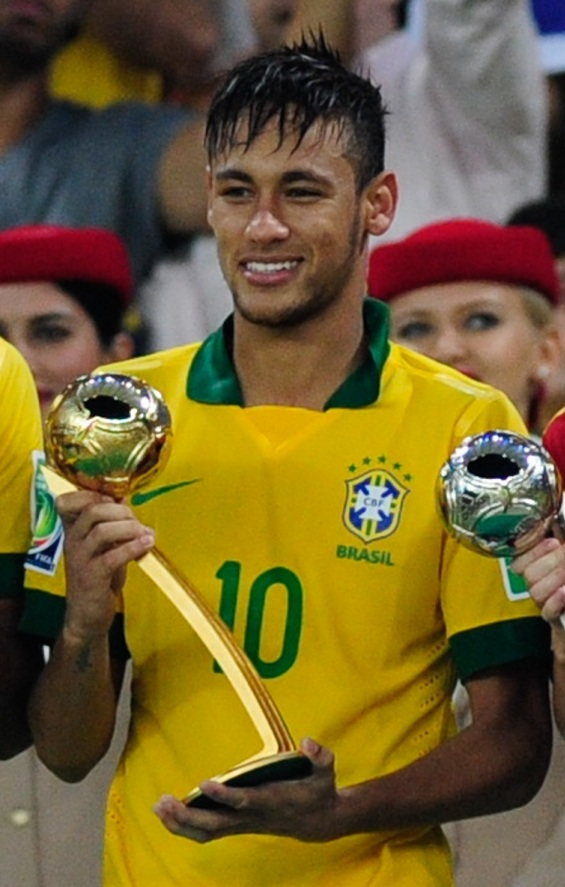
Golden Ball winner Neymar

Golden Ball	Golden Boot
(Brazil) Neymar	(Spain) Fernando Torres
Silver Ball	Silver Boot
(Spain) Andrés Iniesta	(Brazil) Fred
Bronze Ball	Bronze Boot
(Brazil) Paulinho	(Brazil) Neymar
Golden Glove	FIFA Fair Play Trophy
(Brazil) Júlio César	Spain

Source: FIFA

FIFA.com Users' Dream Team
Goalkeeper	Defenders	Midfielders	Forwards	Coach
(Brazil) Júlio César	(Brazil) Dani Alves (Spain) Sergio Ramos (Brazil) Thiago Silva (Brazil) David Luiz	(Spain) Andrés Iniesta (Italy) Andrea Pirlo (Brazil) Paulinho	(Brazil) Neymar (Spain) Fernando Torres (Brazil) Fred	(Brazil) Luiz Felipe Scolari

Source: FIFA

== Statistics ==
=== Goalscorers ===
Fernando Torres was awarded the Golden Boot award on tie-breakers. Both he and Fred scored five goals and made one assist, but Torres was given the award due to having played fewer minutes over the tournament. In total, 68 goals were scored by 38 different players, with three of them credited as own goals.

5 goals

- (Brazil) Fred
- (Spain) Fernando Torres

4 goals

- (Brazil) Neymar
- (Uruguay) Abel Hernández

3 goals

- (Mexico) Javier Hernández
- (Nigeria) Nnamdi Oduamadi
- (Spain) David Villa
- (Uruguay) Edinson Cavani
- (Uruguay) Luis Suárez

2 goals

- (Brazil) Jô
- (Brazil) Paulinho
- (Italy) Mario Balotelli
- (Japan) Shinji Okazaki
- (Spain) Jordi Alba
- (Spain) David Silva

1 goal

- (Brazil) Dante
- (Italy) Davide Astori
- (Italy) Giorgio Chiellini
- (Italy) Daniele De Rossi
- (Italy) Alessandro Diamanti
- (Italy) Emanuele Giaccherini
- (Italy) Sebastian Giovinco
- (Italy) Andrea Pirlo
- (Japan) Keisuke Honda
- (Japan) Shinji Kagawa
- (Nigeria) Elderson Echiéjilé
- (Nigeria) Mikel John Obi
- (Spain) Juan Mata
- (Spain) Pedro
- (Spain) Roberto Soldado
- (French Polynesia) Jonathan Tehau
- (Uruguay) Diego Forlán
- (Uruguay) Nicolás Lodeiro
- (Uruguay) Diego Lugano
- (Uruguay) Diego Pérez

1 Own goal

- (Japan) Atsuto Uchida (against Italy)
- (French Polynesia) Jonathan Tehau (against Nigeria)
- (French Polynesia) Nicolas Vallar (against Nigeria)

Source: FIFA

=== Tournament ranking ===
Per statistical convention in football, matches decided in extra time are counted as wins and losses, while matches decided by penalty shoot-outs are counted as draws.

Pos	Grp	Team	Pld	W	D	L	GF	GA	GD	Pts	Final result
1	A	Brazil (H)	5	5	0	0	14	3	+11	15	Champions
2	B	Spain	5	3	1	1	15	4	+11	10	Runners-up
3	A	Italy	5	2	2	1	10	10	0	8	Third place
4	B	Uruguay	5	2	1	2	14	7	+7	7	Fourth place
5	B	Nigeria	3	1	0	2	7	6	+1	3	Eliminated in group stage
6	A	Mexico	3	1	0	2	3	5	−2	3	Eliminated in group stage
7	A	Japan	3	0	0	3	4	9	−5	0	Eliminated in group stage
8	B	Tahiti	3	0	0	3	1	24	−23	0	Eliminated in group stage

Source: FIFA
(H) Hosts

== Match ball ==
See also Adidas Tango 12

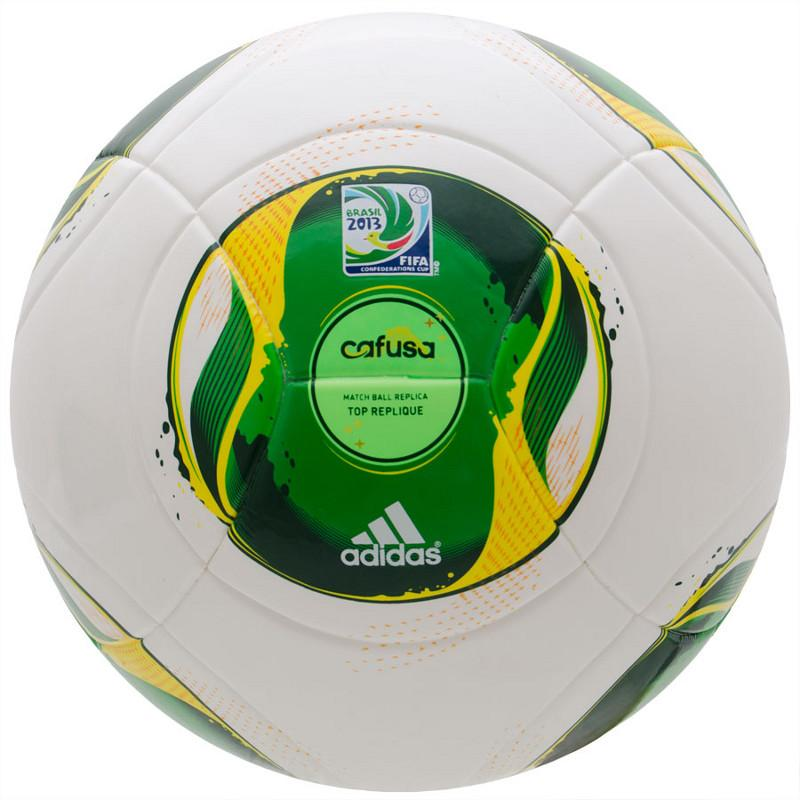
Adidas Cafusa, the official match ball of the tournament

The official match ball for the Cup was produced by Adidas, a development of the Adidas Tango 12. It was unveiled during the draw for the competition. The ball is named "Cafusa" (pronounced [kɐˈfuzɐ]) – a syllabic abbreviation of the words "carnaval" (Carnival), "futebol" (football) and "samba", aside of being homophonous with cafuza, the Portuguese name for a zamba i.e. a woman of mixed Amerindian and black African descent. Former Brazil captain Cafu was invited to officially unveil the ball.

== Prize money ==
The competing national football associations received prize money from FIFA based on their representative team's final finishing position.

Competition stage	Final position	Prize money (US dollars)
Final	Winner	$4.1m
Final	Runner-up	$3.6m
Match for third place	Third place	$3m
Match for third place	Fourth place	$2.5m
Group stage	Fifth to eighth place	$1.7m

== Goal-line technology ==
The 2013 FIFA Confederations Cup was the first international tournament for national teams to use goal-line technology. The IFAB officially approved the use of goal-line technology in July 2012, and it was first used in a FIFA competition for the 2012 FIFA Club World Cup in December 2012. Having trialled systems from both Hawk-Eye and GoalRef during the Club World Cup, FIFA announced on 2 April 2013 that the German technology GoalControl had been chosen as the official goal-line technology for the 2013 FIFA Confederations Cup. Its system, GoalControl-4D, uses 14 high-speed cameras located around the pitch and directed at both goals. It was used in the match for third place between Uruguay and Italy to determine the scorer of Italy's first goal.

== Protests ==
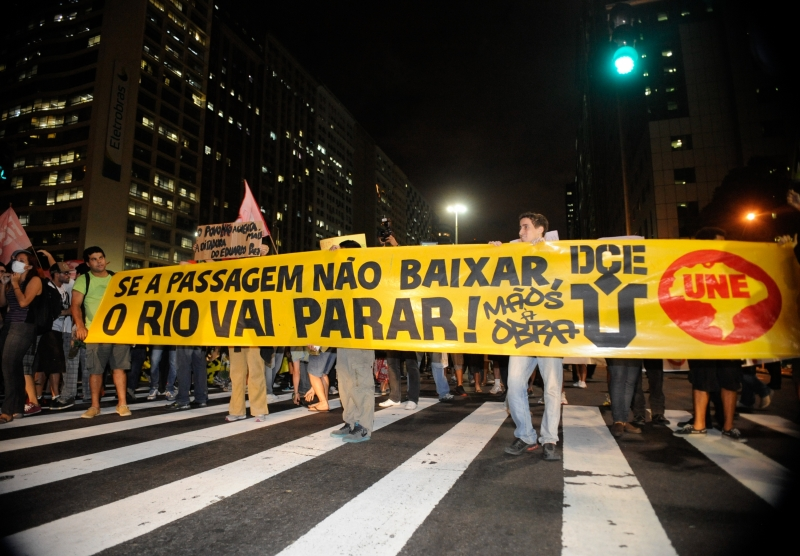
Protesters on the streets of Rio de Janeiro. Their sign translates to "If the bus fare doesn't drop, Rio is going to stop!"

Prior to the opening ceremony at the Brasilia National Stadium on 15 June, demonstrations took place outside the stadium, organised by people unhappy with the amount of public money spent to enable the hosting of the FIFA World Cup. Police used tear gas and pepper spray to quell the protests.

The demonstrations were part of wider unrest and rioting in Brazilian cities initially sparked by increased ticket prices on public transport, but growing to express deeper public disenchantment with the financial management of the country by its government, specially due to the high inflation. The Brazilian president Dilma Rousseff as well as FIFA president Sepp Blatter were heavily booed as they were announced to conduct their speeches at the tournament's opening. Further protests took place the following day prior to the game between Mexico and Italy in Rio de Janeiro. Blatter said that the protesters "should not use football to make their demands heard", and that the public expenditure on staging the tournaments was on "items that are for the future, not just for the World Cup".

As the protests continued to intensify during the week, with a reported participation of over a million people taking to the streets in a hundred different towns and cities, reports in the Brazilian media suggested that FIFA was having to negotiate with the teams to keep them in Brazil and that the tournament could be abandoned. However, a FIFA statement on 21 June insisted that "to date, neither FIFA nor the local organising committee have ever discussed any such possibility of cancelling the FIFA Confederations Cup".

FIFA General Secretary Jérôme Valcke subsequently admitted that FIFA had held a "crisis meeting" involving the Brazilian government regarding the completion of the tournament, but sought to distance FIFA from the wider social unrest, stating that "the most important thing for us is to detach the World Cup or the Confederations Cup from these problems. We are not the answer to all problems and we are definitely not the reason for such a crisis. We are just part of what Brazil is doing for the next 20 years....the light FIFA is being shown in here, is the wrong one". He also reaffirmed that the protests had not caused FIFA to consider moving the 2014 World Cup away from Brazil.

Just before the final in Rio de Janeiro, a large crowd marched towards the stadium both in support of the team and in continuation over the original protests. Though largely peaceful, there were some disturbances.
