= Emanuele Giaccherini =

Italian footballer (born 1985)

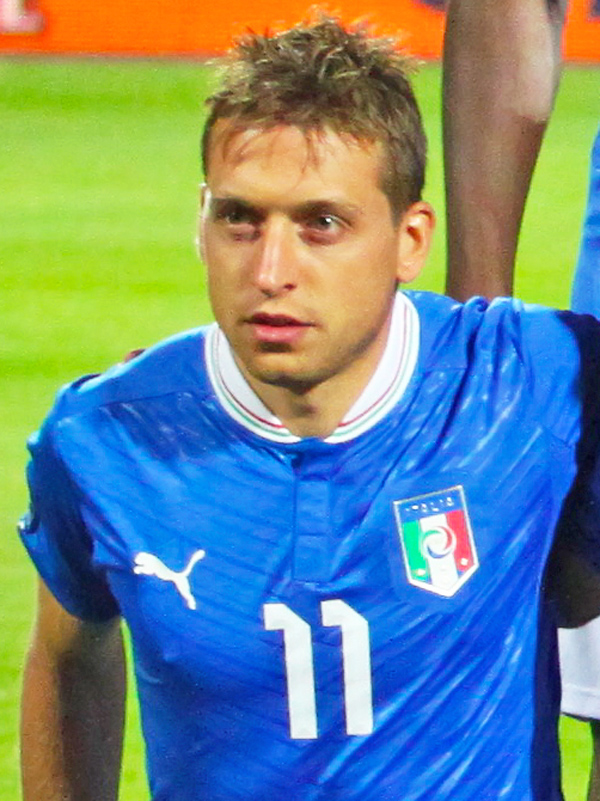
- Giaccherini with Italy in 2012

Personal information
- Full name: Emanuele Giaccherini
- Date of birth: 5 May 1985 (age 41)
- Place of birth: Bibbiena, Tuscany, Italy
- Height: 1.67 m (5 ft 6 in)
- Position: Midfielder

Youth career
- Cesena

Senior career*
Years	Team	Apps	(Gls)
2004–2011	Cesena	97	(20)
2004–2005	→ Forlì (loan)	22	(1)
2005–2007	→ Bellaria Igea (loan)	37	(3)
2007–2008	→ Pavia (loan)	28	(9)
2011–2013	Juventus	40	(4)
2013–2016	Sunderland	32	(4)
2015–2016	→ Bologna (loan)	28	(7)
2016–2018	Napoli	20	(1)
2018	→ Chievo (loan)	13	(3)
2018–2021	Chievo	62	(10)
Total		379	(62)

International career
2012–2016	Italy	29	(4)
Medal record
Men's Football
Representing Italy
UEFA European Championship
Runner-up	2012 Poland–Ukraine
FIFA Confederations Cup
Third place	2013 Brazil
- * Club domestic league appearances and goals

Emanuele Giaccherini (Italian pronunciation: [emanuˈɛːle dʒakkeˈriːni]; born 5 May 1985) is an Italian former professional footballer who played as an attacking midfielder.

He began his career at Cesena, and after loans at three lower-league clubs, helped them to consecutive promotions to reach Serie A. He then left to Juventus, where he won the league title in both of his seasons. He joined Sunderland on a four-year deal in 2013, before moving to Napoli in 2016. Two years later, he joined Chievo.

Giaccherini has earned over 20 caps for the Italy national football team, helping the nation to the final of UEFA Euro 2012 and a third-place finish at the 2013 FIFA Confederations Cup, also taking part at UEFA Euro 2016.

== Club career ==
=== Cesena ===
Born in Bibbiena, Tuscany, Giaccherini started his professional career at Romagna team Cesena. He scored 15 goals in the group stages of the Campionato Nazionale Primavera in the 2003–04 season. He was then sent out on loan to Lega Pro clubs Forli, Bellaria Igea and Pavia for four seasons.

Cesena was relegated to the Lega Pro Prima Divisione in 2008, when Giaccherini returned and was partnered with Simone Motta in attack. Cesena came top of the Prima Divisione in June 2009. Due to their good defensive record Cesena finished as runner-up in the 2009–10 Serie B season and was therefore promoted to Serie A, where Giaccherini was partnered with Guilherme do Prado, Dominique Malonga, Ezequiel Schelotto and Cristian Bucchi in attack, none of whom managed to hit double figures.

In August 2010 Cesena offered a new contract to Giaccherini as his current contract was due to expire in 2012.

In the 2010–11 Serie A season Giaccherini remained a first-choice starter and was partnered with wing-forward Schelotto and Erjon Bogdani. The club once again reached the top of the table but went on a winless run after the third match as a result of which Luis Jiménez replaced Schelotto as Giaccherini's new attacking partner. Giaccherini managed to score in seven matches that season, including a goal in a 2–0 win against Milan and once in a 2–3 loss to Inter. He also scored a brace on 6 March as Cesena beat Sampdoria 3–2, and managed 3 more goals in the last 7 matches of the season.

He made four assists in his maiden Serie A season which was one short of Luca Ceccarelli.

=== Juventus ===
On 25 August 2011, Giaccherini officially transferred to Juventus on a €3 million co-ownership with Cesena retaining 50% of his contract. He made his competitive debut for Juventus against Parma. On 8 December 2011, he scored his first goal for the Bianconeri, an angled solo effort in a 2–1 win over Bologna in the Coppa Italia. He scored his first Serie A goal for the club on 21 January 2012, scoring the second in a 2–0 victory over Atalanta on a volley from Luca Marrone. Three days later he scored the first goal in Juventus's 3–0 Coppa Italia victory against Roma. Due to injuries and suspensions to first choice centre midfielders Claudio Marchisio and Arturo Vidal, Conte has played him in a more central role. Juventus won the Serie A title unbeaten that season and reached the final of the Coppa Italia, losing to Napoli.

In June 2012 Juventus bought him outright for €4.25 million, in a deal that would keep him tied to the club until June 2015. Juventus won the Supercoppa Italiana against Napoli and retained the Serie A title during the 2012–13 season. They also reached the semi-finals of the Coppa Italia and the Quarter-finals of the UEFA Champions League, losing, in both competitions, to the respective winners, Lazio and Bayern Munich.

On 11 July 2013, Juventus manager Antonio Conte confirmed the sale of Giaccherini to English club Sunderland, in order to raise funds.

=== Sunderland ===
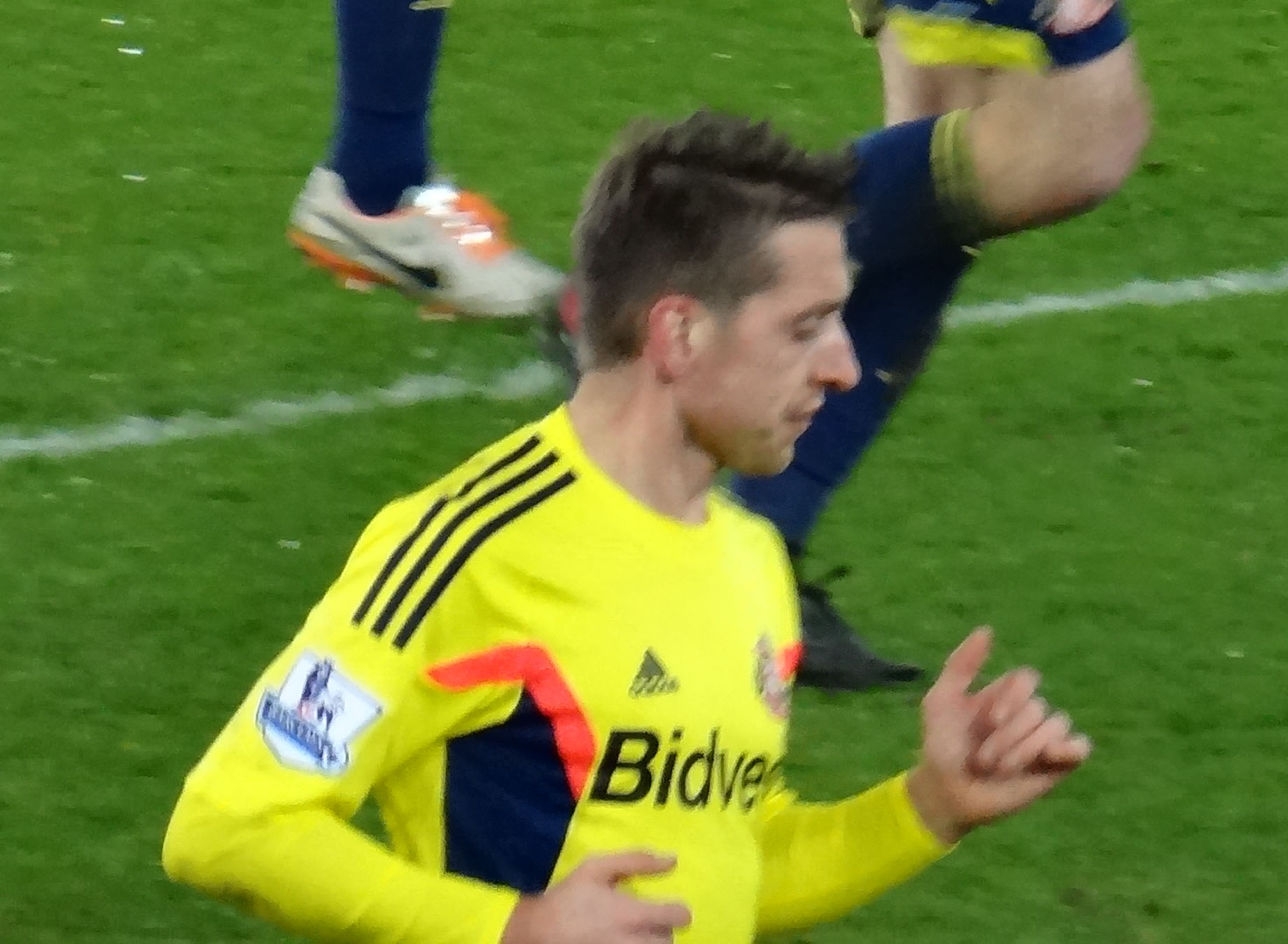
Giaccherini playing for Sunderland in 2013

Sunderland confirmed the signing of Giaccherini on 16 July 2013, on a four-year contract after joining up with his new team during their pre-season training camp near Lake Garda.

He made his debut on 17 August, in a 1–0 defeat at home to Fulham. In his second match of the campaign, he scored a headed goal as Sunderland drew 1–1 away to Southampton on 24 August. His first cup goal came on 24 September 2013 in a 2–0 League Cup win against Peterborough. His second league goal, came in the following game at home to Liverpool, on 29 September 2013. He was the first to react as Simon Mignolet spilled a Ki Sung-yueng shot, and finished from six yards. On 22 February 2014 Giaccherini scored his fourth goal from a 25-yard shot in a 4–1 loss against Arsenal.

Giaccherini appeared as a 77th-minute substitute for Lee Cattermole in the League Cup Final on 2 March, but was unable to prevent Sunderland losing 3–1 to Manchester City. On 17 April, Giaccherini came on as a substitute with Sunderland trailing 1–0 in the league at the City of Manchester Stadium, and assisted both of Connor Wickham's goals as Sunderland went on to draw 2–2. He scored his fifth goal of the season, and fourth in the league, on 27 April 2014, when he scored the third goal in Sunderland's 4–0 win against Cardiff City, a result which saw Sunderland move out of the relegation zone.

Giaccherini chose to remain at Sunderland for the 2014–15 season, despite missing out on a place in Italy's squad at the 2014 FIFA World Cup. However, he suffered an injury in a pre-season match with Real Betis which ruled him out of the start of the season. He then suffered an ankle injury in a 0–0 draw at Burnley in September, ruling him out for several more weeks. After suffering another ankle injury in February in a 3–1 FA Cup win at Fulham, Giaccherini was ruled out for the rest of the season. On 24 May 2015, Giaccherini made his comeback on the last day of the season when he came off the bench for the last fifteen minutes in a 1–3 away defeat to Chelsea.

=== Loan to Bologna ===
On 31 August 2015, Giaccherini returned to Italy, joining newly promoted Serie A side Bologna on a season long-loan. He suffered yet another injury on 14 September, in a 2–0 away league defeat to Sampdoria, on his debut with the club.

=== Napoli ===
On 16 July 2016, Giaccherini joined Napoli for a reported €1.5 million fee plus bonuses.

On 1 July 2021, Giaccherini announced his retirement from football.

== International career ==
=== Euro 2012 ===
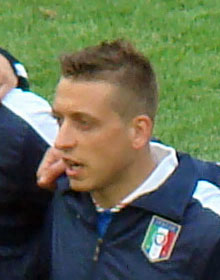
Giaccherini lining up at Euro 2012

Giaccherini was included in Cesare Prandelli's 23-man squad for UEFA Euro 2012. He won his first cap for Italy starting as a left wing-back in a 3–5–2 formation against World Cup champions and defending European Champions Spain on 10 June. Italy eventually reached the final of the tournament, facing Spain once again, and suffering a 4–0 defeat.

=== 2013 Confederations Cup ===
Giaccherini opened the scoring after only 19 seconds of Italy's pre-Confederations Cup friendly against Haiti in Rio de Janeiro on 11 June 2013, played to raise funds for victims of the 2010 Haiti earthquake. The goal was the fastest in Italy's history, one second quicker than Salvatore Bagni's goal against Mexico in 1984.

Giaccherini was included in the 23-man Italy squad for the 2013 FIFA Confederations Cup in Brazil. Giaccherini played in every match of the tournament and was one of Italy's most important players throughout the competition; in the opening game against Mexico on 16 June, he assisted Mario Balotelli's match-winning goal. In Italy's second match against Japan, a pass across goal by Giaccherini was deflected by Atsuto Uchida, who scored an own goal; the match ended 4–3 to Italy, qualifying them for the semifinals of the tournament for the first time in their history. Giaccherini scored Italy's temporary equaliser against hosts Brazil in the final group match, although they eventually lost the match 4–2.

He started in the semifinal against Spain, which ended in a 0–0 draw, although Giaccherini hit the post in extra time. Spain went through to the final after winning the resulting shootout 7–6. Italy managed to win the bronze medal match 3–2 on penalties against Uruguay, after a 2–2 draw following extra time, with Giaccherini netting Italy's last penalty before Gianluigi Buffon won the match for Italy by saving Walter Gargano's spot kick. Due to his exploits throughout the tournament, the Brazilian fans gave him the nickname Giaccherinho.

=== Euro 2016 ===
On 31 May 2016, Giaccherini was named to Antonio Conte's 23-man Italy squad for UEFA Euro 2016. On 13 June 2016, in Italy's first match of Euro 2016, Giaccherini slotted a goal after a half-pitch pass from Leonardo Bonucci to take the lead against Belgium in an eventual 2–0 victory. He was later named man of the match. In the round of 16 at Stade de France in Paris on 27 June, he assisted Giorgio Chiellini's opening goal in a 2–0 win over defending champions Spain. On 2 July, he converted a penalty in a 6–5 shoot-out defeat to defending World Cup champions Germany in the quarter-finals of the competition.

== Style of play ==
Giaccherini was a consistent, energetic, quick, hard-working, and versatile player. He was capable of aiding his team defensively, but also offensively, due to his ability to make attacking runs, exploit spaces, get on the end of passes, and stretch defences; which along with his reliable distribution, allowed him to contribute to his teams' offensive plays with goals and assists. A diminutive and technically gifted player, he was initially deployed as a winger on either flank early in his career, due to his speed, dribbling ability, agility, acceleration, and balance, which aided him in beating opposing players in one on one situations. He was capable of playing anywhere in midfield, however, and was most commonly deployed as a central midfielder, as a mezzala, as a wing-back, or as an attacking midfielder. He was also been used as a second striker.

== Career statistics ==
=== Club ===
Appearances and goals by club, season and competition
Club	Season	League			Cup (Note: Appearances in Coppa Italia, Coppa Italia Serie C, Coppa Italia Lega Pro, Football League Cup and FA Cup)		Continental (Note: Appearances in UEFA Champions League)		Other (Note: Appearances in Supercoppa Italiana)		Total	
Club	Season	Division	Apps	Goals	Apps	Goals	Apps	Goals	Apps	Goals	Apps	Goals
Forlì (loan)	2004–05	Serie C2	22	1	0	0	–		–		22	1
Bellaria Igea Marina (loan)	2005–06	Serie C2	30	1	0	0	–		–		30	1
Bellaria Igea Marina (loan)	2006–07	Serie C2	7	2	0	0	–		–		7	2
Bellaria Igea Marina (loan)	Total		37	3	0	0	0	0	0	0	37	3
Pavia (loan)	2007–08	Serie C2	28	9	2	1	–		–		30	10
Cesena	2008–09	Lega Pro Prima Divisione	29	5	4	2	–		–		33	7
Cesena	2009–10	Serie B	32	8	2	1	–		–		34	9
Cesena	2010–11	Serie A	36	7	0	0	–		–		36	7
Cesena	Total		97	20	6	3	0	0	0	0	103	23
Juventus	2011–12	Serie A	23	1	4	2	–		–		27	3
Juventus	2012–13	Serie A	17	3	3	0	4	0	1	0	25	3
Juventus	Total		40	4	7	2	4	0	1	0	52	6
Sunderland	2013–14	Premier League	24	4	8	1	–		–		32	5
Sunderland	2014–15	Premier League	8	0	3	0	–		–		11	0
Sunderland	Total		32	4	11	1	0	0	0	0	43	5
Bologna	2015–16	Serie A	28	7	0	0	–		–		28	7
Napoli	2016–17	Serie A	16	1	1	1	2	0	–		19	2
Napoli	2017–18	Serie A	4	0	1	0	0	0	0	0	5	0
Napoli	Total		20	1	2	1	2	0	0	0	24	2
Chievo (loan)	2017–18	Serie A	13	3	0	0	–		–		13	3
Chievo	2018–19	Serie A	26	3	2	0	–		–		28	3
Chievo	2019–20	Serie B	23	5	1	0	–		–		24	5
Chievo	2020–21	Serie B	13	2	0	0	–		–		13	2
Chievo	Total		62	10	3	0	0	0	0	0	65	10
Career total			379	62	31	8	6	0	1	0	417	70

=== International ===
Appearances and goals by national team and year
National team	Year	Apps	Goals
Italy	2012	6	0
Italy	2013	12	3
Italy	2014	3	0
Italy	2015	0	0
Italy	2016	8	1
Total		29	4

Scores and results list Italy's goal tally first, score column indicates score after each Giaccherini goal.

List of international goals scored by Emanuele Giaccherini
No.	Date	Venue	Opponent	Score	Result	Competition
1	11 June 2013	Estádio São Januário, Rio de Janeiro, Brazil	Haiti	1–0	2–2	Friendly
2	22 June 2013	Itaipava Arena Fonte Nova, Salvador, Brazil	Brazil	1–1	2–4	2013 FIFA Confederations Cup
3	18 November 2013	Craven Cottage, London, England	Nigeria	2–2	2–2	Friendly
4	13 June 2016	Parc Olympique Lyonnais, Lyon, France	Belgium	1–0	2–0	UEFA Euro 2016

== Honours ==
Juventus

- Serie A: 2011–12, 2012–13
- Supercoppa Italiana: 2012
- Coppa Italia runner-up: 2011–12

Sunderland

- Football League Cup runner-up: 2013–14

Italy

- UEFA European Championship runner-up: 2012
- FIFA Confederations Cup third place: 2013
