= UEFA Euro 2024 final =

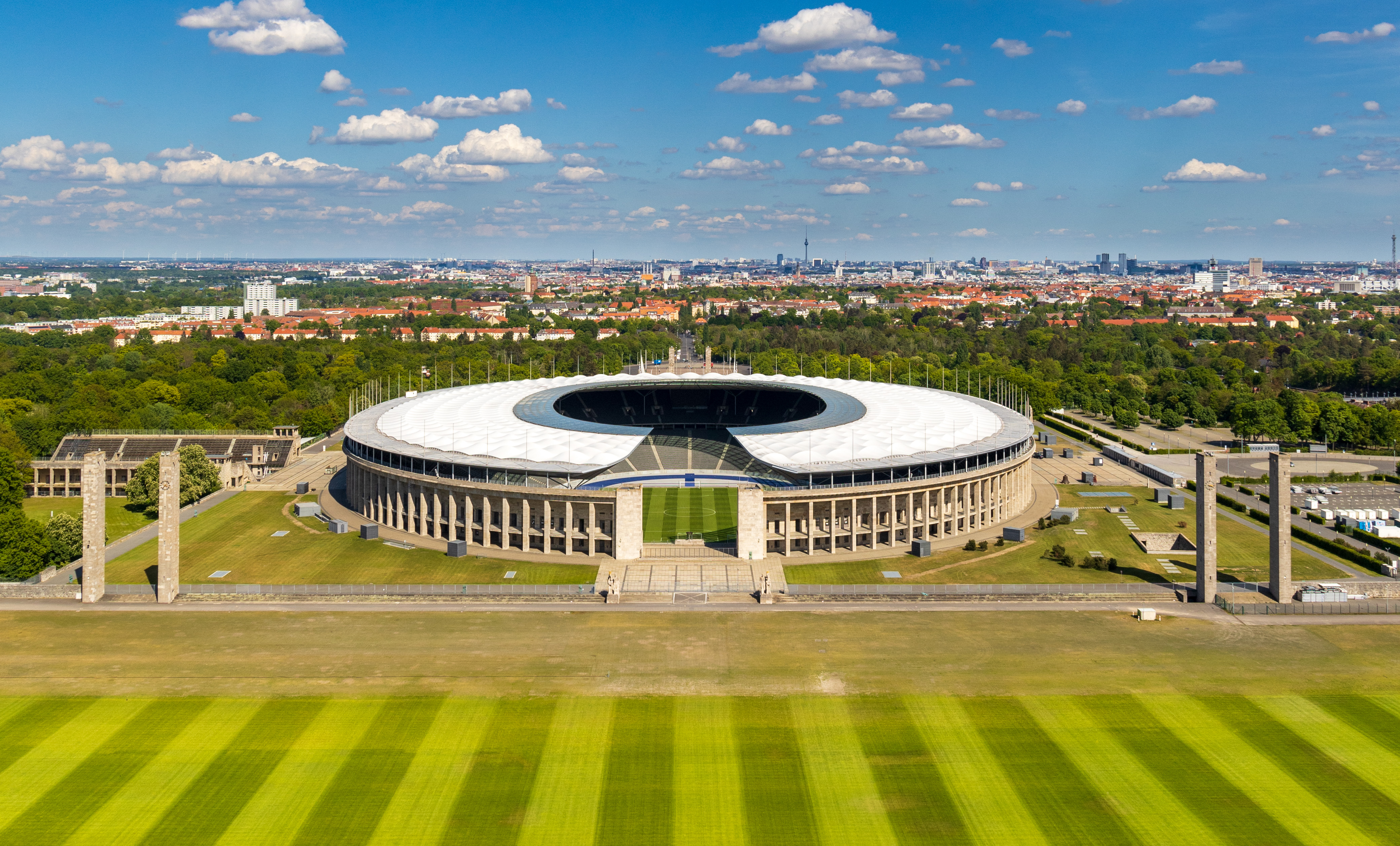
- The Olympiastadion in Berlin hosted the final.
- Event: UEFA Euro 2024
Spain	England
2	1
- Date: 14 July 2024
- Venue: Olympiastadion, Berlin
- Man of the Match: Nico Williams (Spain)
- Referee: François Letexier (France)
- Attendance: 65,600
- Weather: Partly cloudy night 22 °C (72 °F); 53% humidity

The UEFA Euro 2024 final was a football match that determined the winners of UEFA Euro 2024. The match was the seventeenth final of the European Championship, a quadrennial tournament contested by the men's national teams of the member associations of UEFA to decide the champions of Europe. The match was held at the Olympiastadion in Berlin, Germany, on 14 July 2024, and was contested by Spain, in their fifth final, and England, in their second final, but their first appearance in a major men's tournament final held outside their home country. Following their defeat in the previous final, England also became the fourth different side to appear in two consecutive Euro finals, after the Soviet Union (1960 and 1964), West Germany (1972, 1976 and 1980), unified Germany (1992 and 1996), and Spain (2008 and 2012).

In front of a crowd of 65,600, Spain won the match 2–1 for their record-breaking fourth UEFA European Championship title (after 1964, 2008 and 2012), surpassing Germany as the sole record-winners of the competition. It was also their third title in the last five editions of the tournament.

Spain won all seven matches they played in the competition, the first side to accomplish this since France won five out of five in 1984, and set a new record for most goals scored in a single European Championship, with fifteen. England, meanwhile, became the first side to lose consecutive finals. This was also the first time both finalists conceded in every knockout game contested since the tournament's expansion in 1980.

== Venue ==
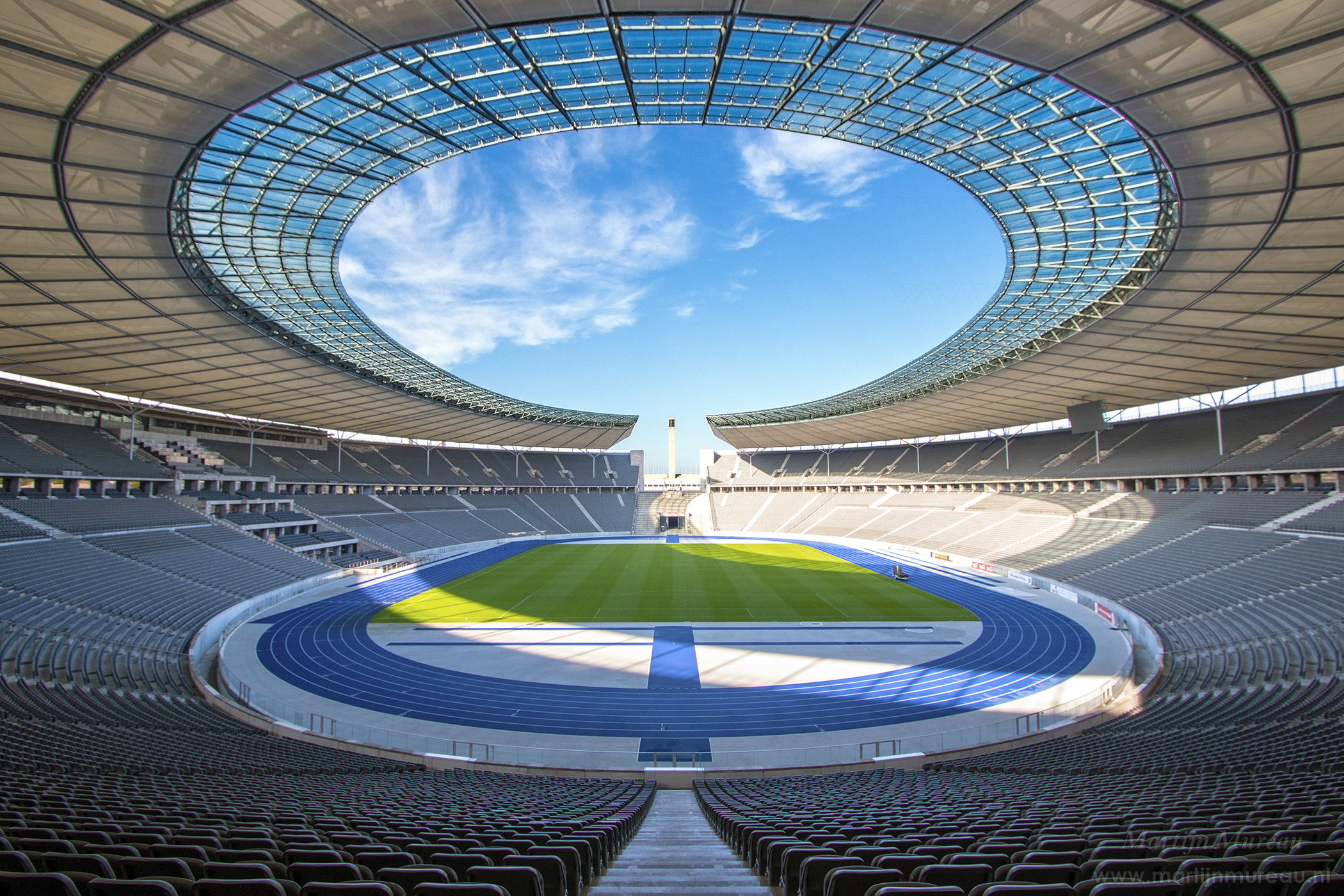
The interior of the Olympiastadion

The final was held at the Olympiastadion in Berlin, Germany, located in Westend of the borough of Charlottenburg-Wilmersdorf. On 27 September 2018, UEFA announced the 2024 tournament would be held in Germany after they had defeated Turkey in the host selection vote in Nyon, Switzerland. The Olympiastadion was chosen as the final venue of the tournament by the UEFA Executive Committee in May 2022, where it was announced it would also host three group stage matches, a round of 16 match, and a quarter-final match in the tournament.

The Olympiastadion opened in 1936 on the Olympiapark Berlin which served specifically for the 1936 Summer Olympics. The stadium is owned by the state of Berlin and has been the home stadium of football club Hertha BSC since 1963. The Germany national team has also occasionally played its home matches at the stadium. The Olympiastadion has also hosted several significant matches, including several matches in the 1974 and 2006 World Cups, the latter of which included the final between Italy and France. It has been the venue of every final of the DFB-Pokal since 1985. It also served as the official opening match venue for the 2011 FIFA Women's World Cup as well as the 2015 UEFA Champions League final between Barcelona and Juventus.

== Route to the final ==
=== Spain ===
Spain's route to the final
	Opponent	Result
1	Croatia	3–0
2	Italy	1–0
3	Albania	1–0
R16	Georgia	4–1
QF	Germany	2–1 (a.e.t.)
SF	France	2–1

Spain qualified for the tournament as qualifying Group A winners, winning seven of their eight matches with their only loss coming against Scotland. They were drawn into Group B along with Croatia, current holders Italy and Albania. Spain opened their campaign with a 3–0 win over Croatia at the Olympiastadion, Álvaro Morata opened the scoring for Spain in the 29th minute, then Fabián Ruiz doubled their advantage in the 32nd minute and Dani Carvajal then added a third for Spain in the 47th minute. By starting this match, Lamine Yamal became the youngest player to make an appearance at a UEFA European Championship final tournament. Spain then played title holders and arch-rivals, Italy at the Arena AufSchalke winning 1–0 with the sole goal coming from a Riccardo Calafiori own goal in the 55th minute. They then rounded off their group stage campaign with another 1–0 win over Albania at the Merkur Spiel-Arena with the lone goal scored by Ferran Torres in the 13th minute, with Spain manager Luis de la Fuente making wholesale changes to the starting eleven due to Spain having already secured top-spot in their group.

In the knockout stage, Spain played the third-placed team from Group F in the Round of 16, Georgia – who were making their European Championship debut – at the RheinEnergieStadion where Spain won 4–1 with goals for the Spanish from Rodri in the 39th minute, Fabián in the 51st minute, Nico Williams in the 75th minute and Dani Olmo in the 83rd minute. Robin Le Normand scored an own goal which acted as a consolation goal for Georgia in the 18th minute. In the quarter-finals, Spain played hosts Germany at the MHPArena, in a re-match of the UEFA Euro 2008 final, which Spain won 1–0. This time Spain won again 2–1 after extra time with Olmo opening the scoring for Spain in the 51st minute, Florian Wirtz then equalised for Germany in the 89th minute. Mikel Merino scored with a header in the 119th minute to send Spain through to the semi-finals and eliminate Julian Nagelsmann's hosts at the last-eight stage. In the semi-finals, Spain played 2022 FIFA World Cup runners-up, France at the Allianz Arena, in a re-match of both the UEFA Euro 1984 final and the 2021 UEFA Nations League final, both of which France won. Spain won this time with Randal Kolo Muani opening the scoring for the French with a header in the 9th minute, but Yamal then equalised for the Spanish in the 21st minute with a shot to the left corner from outside the penalty area, Olmo then scored the winner for Spain in the 25th minute – this was originally given as a Jules Koundé own goal but after a review was given to Olmo – this sent Spain through to their first UEFA European Championship final since the UEFA Euro 2012 final against Italy which they won 4–0. Yamal also became the youngest player to score in a UEFA European Championship.

=== England ===
England's route to the final
	Opponent	Result
1	Serbia	1–0
2	Denmark	1–1
3	Slovenia	0–0
R16	Slovakia	2–1 (a.e.t.)
QF	Switzerland	1–1 (a.e.t.) (5–3 p)
SF	Netherlands	2–1

England qualified for the tournament as Group C winners, winning six of their eight qualification matches. England were drawn into Group C along with Serbia, Denmark, and Slovenia. England opened their campaign with a 1–0 win over Serbia at the Arena AufSchalke, with Jude Bellingham scoring with a header in the 13th minute. England then played Denmark at the Waldstadion, in a re-match of the semi-final at the previous European Championships which England won 2–1 after extra time. This time it ended in a 1–1 draw. Harry Kane scored early on in the 18th minute, but Denmark's Morten Hjulmand equalised with a low shot to the corner before half time in the 34th minute. England finished the group stage by facing Slovenia at the RheinEnergieStadion, which ended goalless. England finished top of the group with five points, and progressed to the knockout stage to play a third place team from one of Groups D, E, or F.

In the knockout stage, England played the third-placed team from Group E in the round of 16, Slovakia at the Arena AufSchalke where England won 2–1. Ivan Schranz opened the scoring for Slovakia in the 25th minute. At the end of the second half, England were seconds away from being knocked out of the competition before Bellingham's bicycle kick goal in the 5th minute of added time sent the game into extra time. Kane immediately scored with a header after extra time started, in the 91st minute. In the quarter-finals, England played Switzerland at the Merkur Spiel-Arena, where they drew 1–1 after extra time, with Breel Embolo opening the scoring for Switzerland in the 75th minute and Bukayo Saka then equalising for England in the 80th minute when he cut in from the right before shooting low to the left corner of the net. With the scores still level after extra time, the match went to a penalty shoot-out, which England won 5–3 with Cole Palmer, Bellingham, Saka, Ivan Toney and Trent Alexander-Arnold all converting their penalties for England and Fabian Schär, Xherdan Shaqiri and Zeki Amdouni all converting their penalty kicks for Switzerland. Only Manuel Akanji missed the opening Switzerland penalty, which was saved by England goalkeeper Jordan Pickford. In the semi-finals, England played the Netherlands at the Westfalenstadion where England won 2–1. Xavi Simons opened the scoring for the Dutch in the 7th minute. Kane then equalised after a controversial penalty kick was awarded for a foul on him by Denzel Dumfries following a video assistant referee review in the 18th minute. England then won the game very late on when Palmer assisted Ollie Watkins to score in the 90th minute, sending them through to their first major tournament final outside of their home country, and their second consecutive European Championship final after appearing in the UEFA Euro 2020 final at Wembley Stadium which they lost to Italy.

=== Head-to-head ===
Their most recent encounter in a senior men's major tournament was the Euro 1996 quarter-final, which England won 4–2 on penalties after a 0–0 draw. England's manager Gareth Southgate was a starting centre back for The Three Lions in that game. Spain's only victory over England in a major tournament was a 1–0 win in the 1950 FIFA World Cup group stage match.

The two teams' latest competitive matches were in League A of the 2018–19 UEFA Nations League, with both teams winning away from home; Spain won 2–1 at Wembley while England won 3–2 at the Estadio Benito Villamarin in Seville.

Across men's and women's, youth and senior football, it is the fourth England–Spain tournament final in just over a year, after the 2023 UEFA European Under-21 Championship final, the 2023 FIFA Women's World Cup final and the 2024 UEFA Women's Under-17 Championship final. The 2023 Under-21 Championship final was won 1–0 by England and featured Álex Baena (for Spain), Cole Palmer and Anthony Gordon (both for England), who were all in the squads for Euro 2024.

== Pre-match ==
=== Notable attendees ===
The match was attended by Prince William, the heir apparent to the British throne and President of the Football Association, together with his elder son Prince George. He also attended the previous tournament's final at Wembley and the Women's Euro 2022 final at the same venue and awarded winner's medals to the victorious England women's team afterwards. Downing Street also confirmed that Sir Keir Starmer, the prime minister of the United Kingdom, would also attend. He was accompanied by Lisa Nandy, the Secretary of State for Culture, Media and Sport, and Debbie Hewitt, chairwoman of the Football Association.

From Spain, both King Felipe VI and his younger daughter, Infanta Sofía, attended the match. King Felipe was one of the authorities who greeted the players at the awards ceremony and the one who presented the trophy to the champions. Both royals later joined the Spanish team's celebrations. Pedro Sánchez, Prime Minister of Spain, also attended, along with the Minister of Education, Vocational Training and Sports, Pilar Alegría.

Relevant German authorities such as the president of Germany, Frank-Walter Steinmeier, the German chancellor, Olaf Scholz, and the president of the Bundestag, Bärbel Bas, were also present.

Also present were Gareth Bale, Lando Norris, David Villa, Xavi, Andrés Iniesta, Harry Styles, Danny Dyer and Dani Dyer.

=== Closing ceremony ===
Before the match started, a closing ceremony was organised by UEFA, which started at 20:45 local time (19:45 UTC). Its theme was to honour the value of the handshake. Two groups from the Berlin-based Lunatix dance company took the spotlight, forming into a double "human wall" in a dance routine, which used the performers' hands and arms to create synchronised movements, before pyrotechnics got underway. After the handshake and the dance, Italian music group Meduza, American pop rock band OneRepublic and German pop singer Leony performed "Fire", the official song of UEFA Euro 2024.

=== Referees ===
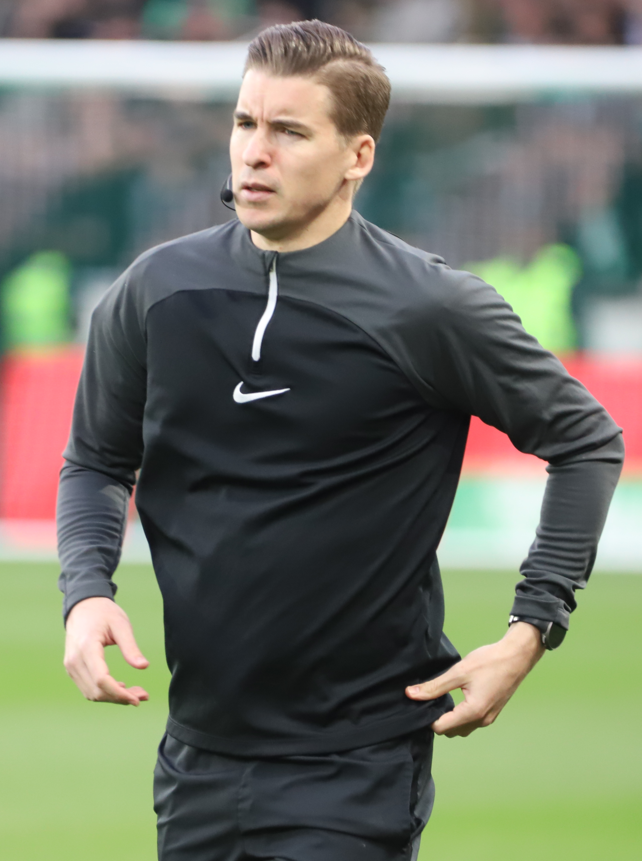
French referee François Letexier officiated the final.

On 11 July 2024, the UEFA Referees Committee announced that French referee François Letexier, who refereed three other games at Euro 2024, would be the referee for the final. At 35, he was the youngest referee of a European Championship final. Letexier was joined by Cyril Mugnier and Mehdi Rahmouni as assistant referees, while Polish referee Szymon Marciniak was the fourth official. The video assistant referees (VAR) were French official Jérôme Brisard, assisted by fellow Frenchman Willy Delajod and supported by Italian referee Massimiliano Irrati. Polish referee Tomasz Listkiewicz was the reserve assistant referee.

== Match ==
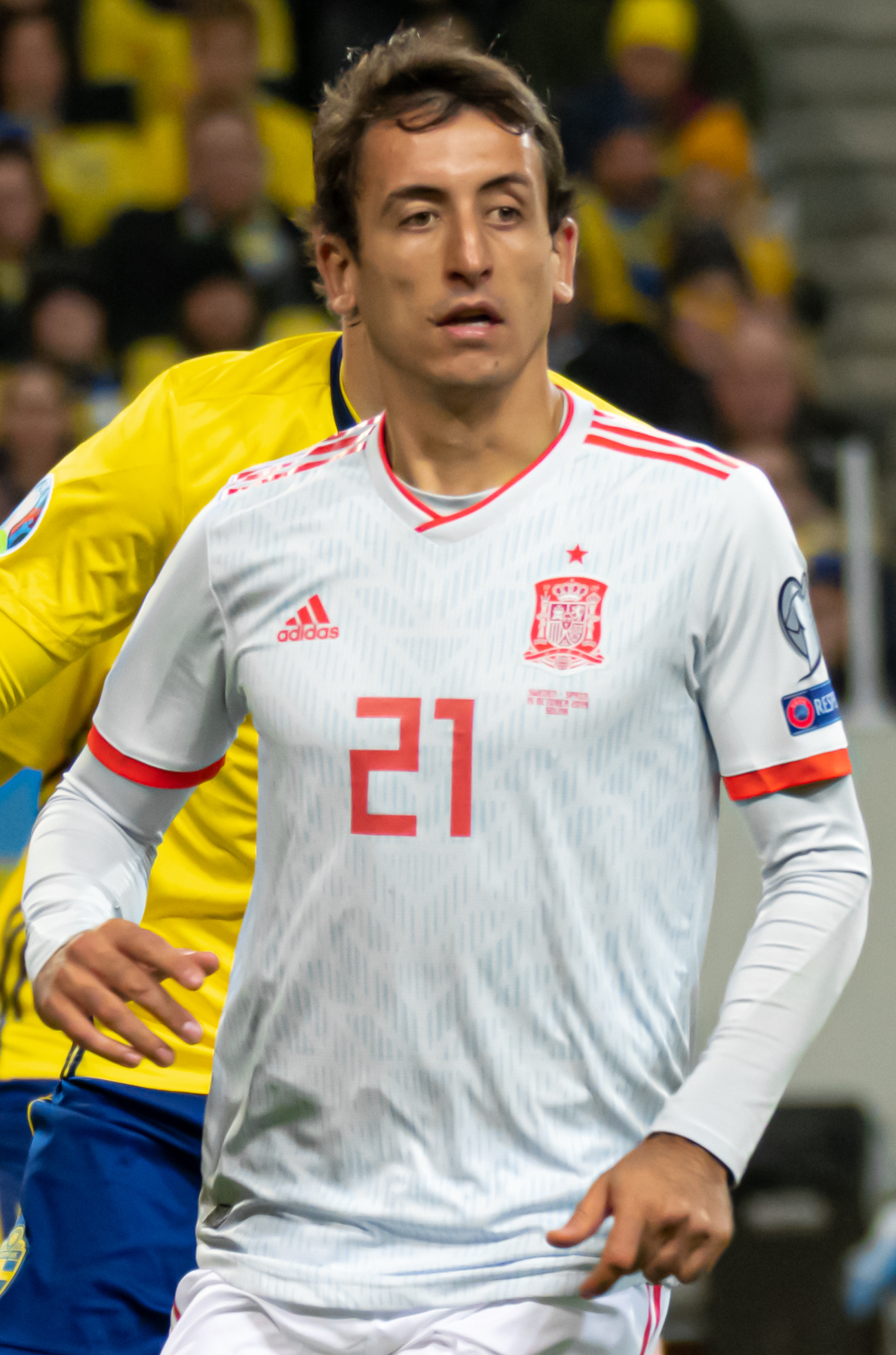
Mikel Oyarzabal scored the game-winning goal for Spain.

=== Summary ===
==== First half ====
Spain won a corner in the early minutes, which was cleared by England, before Spain consolidated possession with frequent passes and opportunities created by Nico Williams. England then won a free kick after a foul on Jude Bellingham in about the tenth minute, which Luke Shaw sent towards the box; a foul on Aymeric Laporte during this play saw possession given to Spain, and Williams again took the ball to the box. In the opening exchanges, while England prevented Spain from getting a shot on target, they also saw little of the ball and struggled when on it, while Spain appeared more settled and were able to play through the lines. England then started to play better for a period after the fifteenth minute, with opportunities created by Bukayo Saka. Targeting the same area, behind Spanish defender Marc Cucurella, England won the ball in the 21st minute but quickly lost it again under pressure from Dani Olmo. Olmo sent the ball over to Lamine Yamal, who had been quieter up to this point with Spain attacking on the other side. Yamal's shot was blocked for a corner, off which England gained possession and launched a counter-attack that was ended when Dani Carvajal fouled Saka. The Guardian said the foul was cynical, and noted that Carvajal made a crying gesture towards England players afterwards when England captain Harry Kane was intervening with the referee about the lack of yellow card on Carvajal. Shaw sent the free kick to the edge of the area; Kane got the ball but followed through, losing it and fouling Fabián Ruiz. Kane was shown a yellow card, which Marca said was deserved. A few minutes later, Ruiz had a shot towards goal that ran through to the goalkeeper.

In about the 30th minute, Olmo tried to win the ball high but fouled Declan Rice, with Olmo receiving a yellow card; in the 34th minute, Yamal beat Shaw to the ball on the wing and made a good run into the box, with Shaw performing a strong sliding tackle to send the ball out for a corner, which led to another corner. Yamal sent this to Olmo at the edge of the box, who had his shot blocked. At this point, Marca noted that Williams had become quieter; The Guardian noted Spain's dominance, though without big chances. England improved at the end of the first half, with defender John Stones dribbling through midfield into the final third and sending a through-ball to reach Kane in the area; defenders around Kane prevented him using it and the ball ran out. England then created another opportunity before losing the ball, with Spanish striker Álvaro Morata carrying it into the box but being blocked by England defenders Stones and Marc Guéhi for a Spain corner that came to nothing. Bellingham won the ball in England's attacking half and crossed it to Kane, whose shot was blocked by Rodri. Soon after, Kyle Walker was fouled to give England a free kick 35 yards from goal; Rice's cross found Phil Foden at the back post, whose tight-angled shot was saved. After two additional minutes, the first half ended goalless.

==== Second half ====
Rodri suffered a hamstring injury in the first half and was substituted off, replaced by Martín Zubimendi, at half time. Spain was dominant again when play resumed for the second half. In the early moments, Yamal got behind Shaw before moving inside and advancing; he crossed low to an on-running Williams, who scored in the 47th minute with a low shot to the right corner. The Guardian said the assist and goal were "almost a mirror image" of Pelé's assist and Carlos Alberto's goal in the 1970 FIFA World Cup final. In the goalscoring play, Olmo had made a more central run, which opened space for Williams, and in the subsequent few minutes Williams and Olmo combined to get in two more shots by the 49th minute, without scoring. Zubimendi then led a break in the 53rd minute, with Stones tactically fouling him; Stones was shown a yellow card. From the free kick, Morata took a shot that was blocked by Guéhi. In the 55th minute, Yamal sent a pass forward that found Morata, who had run in behind Guéhi; Morata shot wide, and Stones cleared the ball, only for it to be recovered by Spain. Williams then also sent a shot just wide from the edge of the area. Spain continued to dominate, though England won a foul (on Saka) in their own half in the 56th minute. In the 61st, Kane was taken off for Ollie Watkins. Saka was fouled again in about the 62nd minute, with England taking it long; Foden sent the ball into the box, but it was headed away. In the 64th minute, Bellingham lost his marker just outside the box and sent a shot just wide. Spain then broke, and Olmo sent the ball forward to Yamal in the 66th minute, who got behind Shaw but was unable to take it with the first touch. Yamal still had the ball, sending in a low shot from the edge of the area that goalkeeper Jordan Pickford pushed around the post for a corner.

In the 68th minute, Morata was taken off for Mikel Oyarzabal, and in the 70th minute Ruiz sent a good chance over the bar. Looking for a way in to attack, England replaced Kobbie Mainoo with Cole Palmer. After Watkins tried a shot from distance in the 71st minute, Spain immediately responded with more attempts. Olmo repeated his through-ball to Yamal, but Yamal was offside, before Oyarzabal had an attempt saved in the 72nd minute. England quickly broke, with Saka running down the wing and crossing to Bellingham in the area; Bellingham gave a first-touch offload to put the ball in front of the on-running Palmer, who scored from outside the box in the 73rd minute with a low shot to the left corner. England had another good run of play after scoring, but Spain were more dominant in possession again by the 78th minute. After taking the ball from England in the midfield in the 82nd minute, Spain took it to the edge of the box, with Olmo and Williams combining to dummy and let it run in for Yamal, whose curling shot was again saved by Pickford. In the 86th minute, Oyarzabal passed short to Cucurella and ran into the box, outpacing his marker as Cucurella crossed the ball back from the left and Oyarzabal scored reaching the ball with his right foot before Pickford; after a check for offside, the review confirmed that Stones' knee was ahead of Oyarzabal's foot and the goal stood. England tried to respond and Bellingham sent a through-ball in to Watkins in the area in the 88th minute, who was unable to control it and take the chance. Both teams then made substitutions, England adding another forward in Ivan Toney and Spain taking off Yamal. England continued playing urgently, and won a corner in the 90th minute. Palmer sent in the corner, which Rice headed in on target; goalkeeper Unai Simón pushed this back into the area only for Guéhi to head it over Simón to the goal, but Olmo was on the line and headed this away. The ball went back to Rice, who took a shot that went over the bar. Four minutes were added to the end of regulation time, in the first of which, Watkins received a yellow card for a high tackle. Spain played out the end of the game defensively: England won two fouls in the 92nd minute, before conceding a foul in the 93rd; Cucurella stayed down after being fouled to take the game into the 94th minute. England won another foul, and the match was ended for a Spain victory.

=== Details ===
==== Score and lineups ====
14 July 2024
21:00 CEST

Spain	2–1	England
Williams 47'; Oyarzabal 86'	Report	Palmer 73'

Olympiastadion, Berlin
Attendance: 65,600
Referee: François Letexier (France)

Spain	England

GK	23	Unai Simón
RB	2	Dani Carvajal
CB	3	Robin Le Normand		(substituted off) 83'
CB	14	Aymeric Laporte
LB	24	Marc Cucurella
CM	16	Rodri		(substituted off) 46'
CM	8	Fabián Ruiz
RW	19	Lamine Yamal		(substituted off) 89'
AM	10	Dani Olmo	(yellow card) 31'
LW	17	Nico Williams
CF	7	Álvaro Morata (C)		(substituted off) 68'
Substitutions:
MF	18	Martín Zubimendi		(substituted on) 46'
FW	21	Mikel Oyarzabal		(substituted on) 68'
DF	4	Nacho		(substituted on) 83'
MF	6	Mikel Merino		(substituted on) 89'
Manager:
Luis de la Fuente

GK	1	Jordan Pickford
CB	2	Kyle Walker
CB	5	John Stones	(yellow card) 53'
CB	6	Marc Guéhi
RM	7	Bukayo Saka
CM	26	Kobbie Mainoo		(substituted off) 70'
CM	4	Declan Rice
LM	3	Luke Shaw
AM	11	Phil Foden		(substituted off) 89'
AM	10	Jude Bellingham
CF	9	Harry Kane (C)	(yellow card) 25'	(substituted off) 61'
Substitutions:
FW	19	Ollie Watkins	(yellow card) 90+1'	(substituted on) 61'
MF	24	Cole Palmer		(substituted on) 70'
FW	17	Ivan Toney		(substituted on) 89'
Manager:
Gareth Southgate

Man of the Match:
Nico Williams (Spain)

Assistant referees:
Cyril Mugnier (France)
Mehdi Rahmouni (France)
Fourth official:
Szymon Marciniak (Poland)
Reserve assistant referee:
Tomasz Listkiewicz (Poland)
Video assistant referee:
Jérôme Brisard (France)
Assistant video assistant referees:
Willy Delajod (France)
Massimiliano Irrati (Italy)

Match rules

- 90 minutes
- 30 minutes of extra time if necessary
- Penalty shoot-out if scores still level
- Maximum of fifteen named substitutes
- Maximum of five substitutions, with a sixth allowed in extra time
- Maximum of three substitution opportunities, with a fourth allowed in extra time

==== Statistics ====
First half
Statistic	Spain	England
Goals scored	0	0
Total shots	5	3
Shots on target	0	1
Saves	1	0
Ball possession	66%	34%
Corner kicks	6	1
Fouls committed	6	2
Offsides	0	0
Yellow cards	1	1
Red cards	0	0

Second half
Statistic	Spain	England
Goals scored	2	1
Total shots	10	6
Shots on target	5	2
Saves	1	3
Ball possession	59%	41%
Corner kicks	4	1
Fouls committed	5	3
Offsides	1	0
Yellow cards	0	2
Red cards	0	0

Overall
Statistic	Spain	England
Goals scored	2	1
Total shots	15	9
Shots on target	5	3
Saves	2	3
Ball possession	63%	37%
Corner kicks	10	2
Fouls committed	11	5
Offsides	1	0
Yellow cards	1	3
Red cards	0	0

== Post-match ==
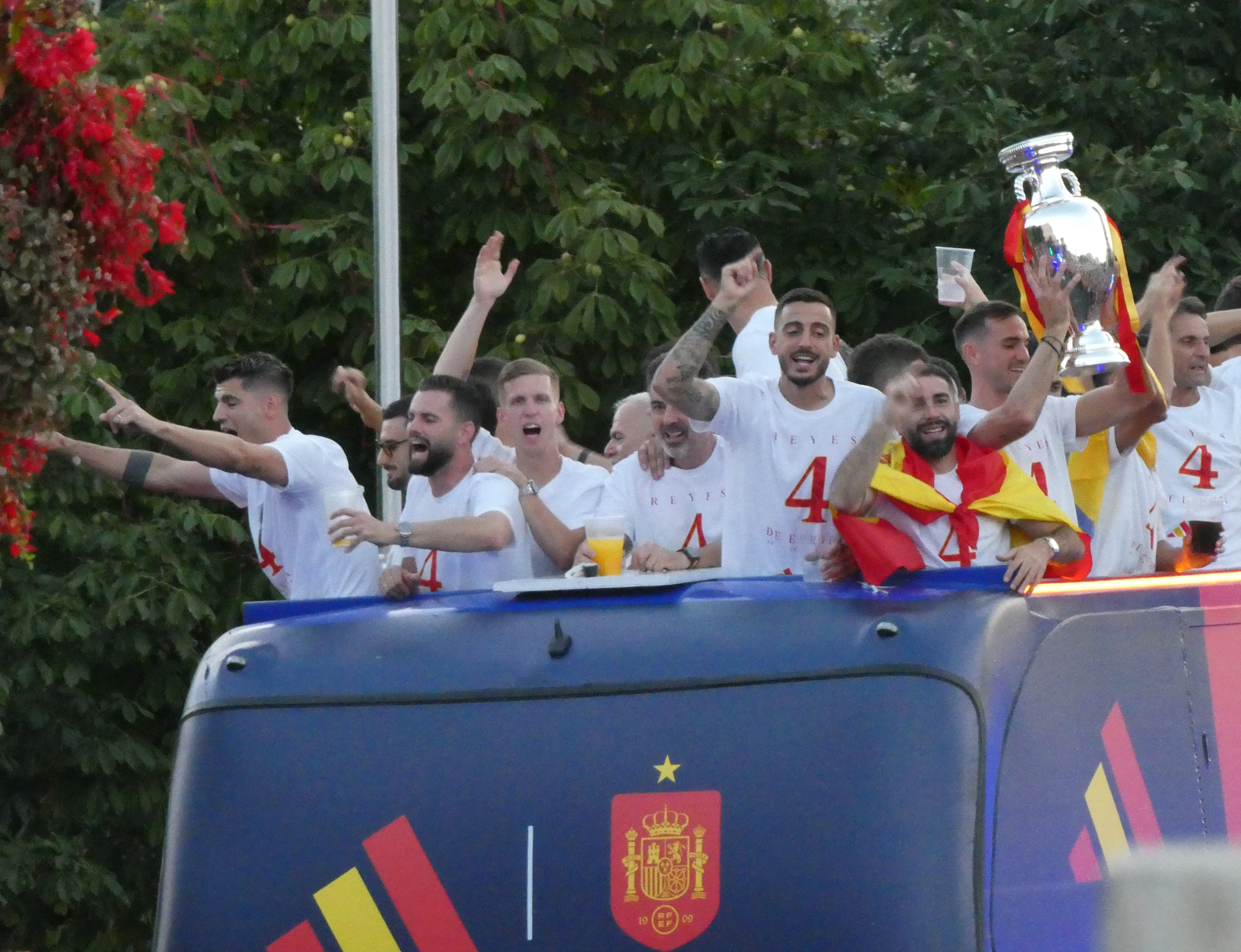
Spanish squad celebrating the title in Madrid, 15 July 2024

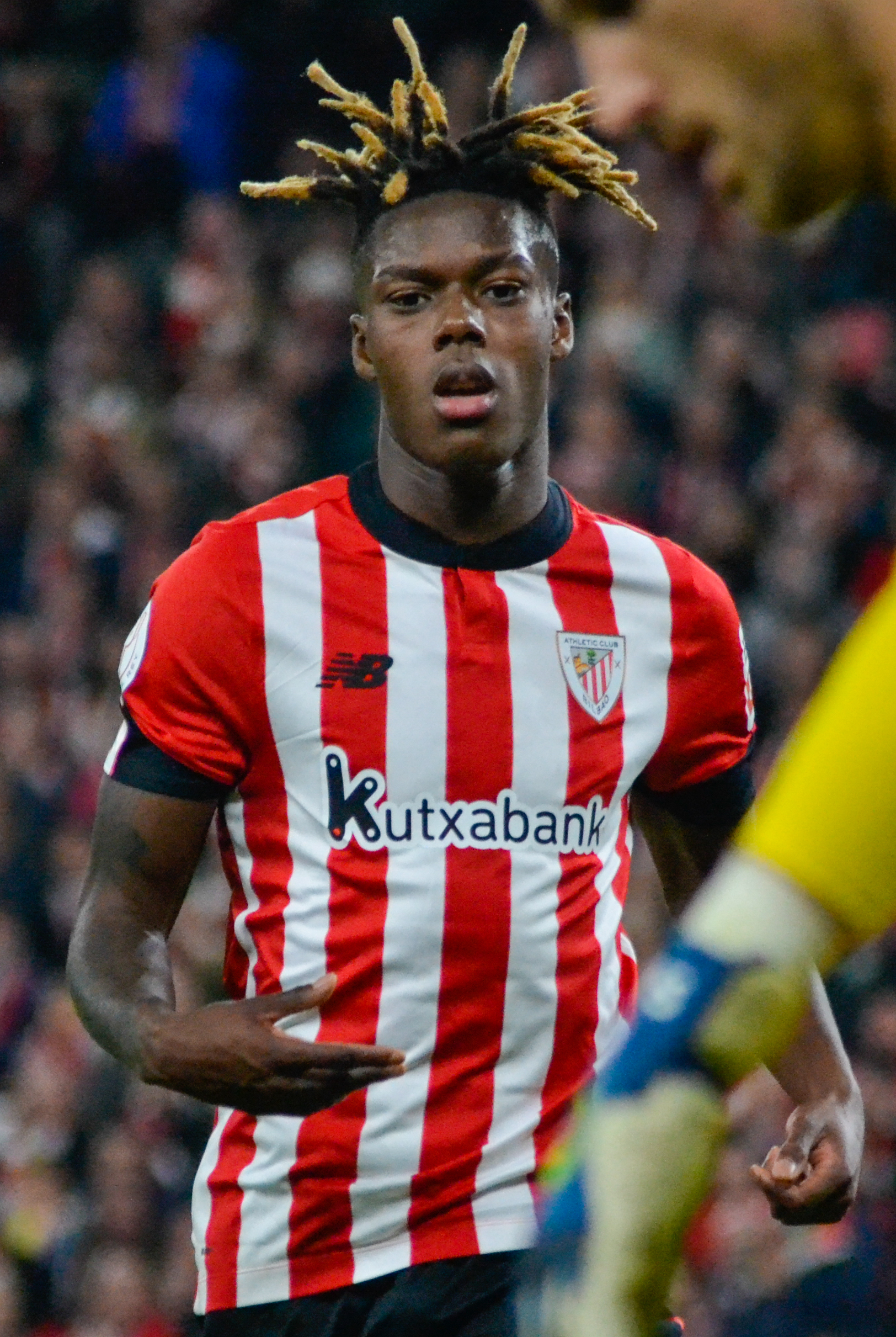
Nico Williams was named player of the match.

UEFA president Aleksander Čeferin was present on the pitch stage during the awards ceremony to hand out the medals and present the trophy to Spanish captain Álvaro Morata. He was joined by King of Spain Felipe VI. Giorgio Chiellini, Italy's winning Euro 2020 captain and a former teammate of Morata, brought the trophy onto the pitch for the ceremony. Spain became the first European champions to have won all their group and knockout matches without any penalty shootouts since France in 1984.

Spanish winger Nico Williams was named as the man of the match, and his teammate Rodri was named as the UEFA European Championship Player of the Tournament. Spain's Lamine Yamal, who turned 17 the day before the final, was named as the UEFA Young Player of the Tournament, making him the youngest ever player to feature in a UEFA Euro or FIFA World Cup showpiece. The Spanish team celebrated their victory with a parade through Madrid on an open-top bus to Plaza de Cibeles the day after the final on 15 July, attended by thousands. The team met with King Felipe VI, the Spanish royal family and the prime minister of Spain Pedro Sánchez. During the celebrations, players Rodri and Álvaro Morata chanted that Gibraltar is Spanish, leading to condemnation from the Government of Gibraltar and a formal complaint to UEFA from the Gibraltar Football Association.

Emlyn Begley of BBC Sport wrote that Spain's triumph was unanimously seen as "fully deserved", as the team had won all seven games without going to a penalty shootout, against difficult opposition. English pundits including Chris Sutton, Gary Lineker, Micah Richards and Alan Shearer praised Spain for playing attacking football and working as a team, while considering England to be a selection of individuals rather than a team. Gary Neville said "it feels like a never-ending story where we just can't get over the line" and described a sense of "rinse and repeat" of England failing to keep the ball well enough at major championships. Spanish football journalist Guillem Balagué praised Spain manager Luis de la Fuente for winning the competition with players he had managed to under-19 and under-21 titles in the 2010s. De la Fuente praised his side and said they had been "infallible" and did "everything right", adding "these players have made history and they still have a long way to go" and that "this group can keep growing because they do not tire of hard work, competing and trying to win." Spain match-winner Mikel Oyarzabal said he was lucky enough to give the victory, adding "I have done my job. I did what I had to do at every moment to try to help", while defender Marc Cucurella added: "We deserved it from the start. Not many people backed us, but we kept quiet and did our job, which is to play football."

England manager Gareth Southgate praised his team for their efforts but admitted they "fell short", saying "we had an opportunity to win and we haven't been able to take it". Immediately after the game, Southgate said that he could not answer whether it would be his final match. Captain Harry Kane said they had done well to get back into the game, adding "We could have used that momentum to push on", concluding: "It's as painful as it could be in a football match." Jude Bellingham said they had sacrificed a lot throughout the last weeks and admitted feeling "mentally and physically exhausted" and "absolutely dead". King Charles III congratulated the England team in a letter addressed to Southgate, calling it "a really great achievement in itself" to reach the final. Southgate resigned two days after the final even though he was offered a contract extension by The FA.

== See also ==
- Spain at the UEFA European Championship
- England at the UEFA European Championship
- UEFA Women's Euro 2025 final – also contested by England and Spain
