= Italy–Spain football rivalry =

Football rivalry between the national teams of Italy and Spain

- Location: Europe (UEFA)
- Teams: Italy; Spain
- First meeting: 2 September 1920; Summer Olympics; Spain 2–0 Italy
- Latest meeting: 20 June 2024; UEFA European Championship; Spain 1–0 Italy

Statistics
- Total meetings: 41
- Most wins: Spain (14)
- All-time series: Spain: 14; Draw: 16; Italy: 11
- Largest victory: Italy 7–1 Spain; Summer Olympics (4 June 1928)
- Largest goal scoring: Italy 7–1 Spain; Summer Olympics (4 June 1928)

The Italy–Spain football rivalry (Italian: Rivalità calcistica Italia-Spagna; Spanish: Rivalidad futbolística Italia-España) sometimes referred to as the Mediterranean derby, is a football rivalry between the national football teams of Italy and Spain. The two countries have won six FIFA World Cups and six UEFA European Championship between them; Italy have won four World Cups and two European Championships, while Spain have won two World Cups and four European Championships. They have played against each other three times in the World Cup and seven times in the European Championship, including each of the five most recent Euros from 2008 to 2024. Most notably, the two met at the UEFA Euro 2012 final, which Spain won. They also met at the 2013 FIFA Confederations Cup and the UEFA Nations League semi-finals in both 2021 and 2023.

Spain has won 14, and Italy 11, of the 41 matches between them (including four at the Summer Olympic Games in the 1920s). Although the two nations are not immediate geographical neighbours, their rivalry at international level is enhanced by the strong performances of the representative clubs in UEFA competitions, in which they are among the leading associations and have each enjoyed spells of dominance. Including the defunct UEFA Cup Winners' Cup, twelve continental finals have been contested between an Italian and a Spanish representative (eight victories for Spanish clubs and four victories of Italian teams). The frequent meetings between the clubs have led to the elite players becoming very familiar with one another when they meet at national level. The two nations' under-21 teams, which are also among the strongest in the world, are also acknowledged as rivals.

== List of matches ==
Number	Date	Location	Competition	Results
1	2 September 1920	(Belgium) Antwerp	1920 Summer Olympics	Spain 2–0 Italy
2	9 March 1924	(Italy) Milan	Friendly	Italy 0–0 Spain
3	25 May 1924	(France) Colombes	1924 Summer Olympics	Italy 1–0 Spain
4	14 June 1925	(Spain) Valencia	Friendly	Spain 1–0 Italy
5	29 May 1927	(Italy) Bologna	Friendly	Italy 2–0 Spain
6	22 April 1928	(Spain) Gijón	Friendly	Spain 1–1 Italy
7	1 June 1928	(Netherlands) Amsterdam	1928 Summer Olympics	Italy 1–1 Spain (Note: The quarter-final match ended in a draw after extra time.)
8	4 June 1928	(Netherlands) Amsterdam	1928 Summer Olympics	Italy 7–1 Spain (Note: The quarter-final was replayed after ending in a draw; Italy won the replay and advanced.)
9	22 June 1930	(Italy) Bologna	Friendly	Italy 2–3 Spain
10	19 April 1931	(Spain) Bilbao	Friendly	Spain 0–0 Italy
11	31 May 1934	(Italy) Florence	1934 World Cup	Italy 1–1 Spain (Note: The quarter-final match ended in a draw after extra time.)
12	1 June 1934	(Italy) Florence	1934 World Cup	Italy 1–0 Spain (Note: The quarter-final was replayed the next day after ending in a draw; Italy won the replay and advanced.)
13	19 April 1942	(Italy) Milan	Friendly	Italy 4–0 Spain
14	27 March 1949	(Spain) Madrid	Friendly	Spain 1–3 Italy
15	28 February 1959	(Italy) Rome	Friendly	Italy 1–1 Spain
16	13 March 1960	(Spain) Barcelona	Friendly	Spain 3–1 Italy
17	21 February 1970	(Spain) Madrid	Friendly	Spain 2–2 Italy
18	20 February 1971	(Italy) Cagliari	Friendly	Italy 1–2 Spain
19	25 January 1978	(Spain) Madrid	Friendly	Spain 2–1 Italy
20	21 December 1978	(Italy) Rome	Friendly	Italy 1–0 Spain
21	12 June 1980	(Italy) Milan	Euro 1980	Italy 0–0 Spain
22	14 June 1988	(West Germany) Frankfurt	Euro 1988	Italy 1–0 Spain
23	9 July 1994	(United States) Foxborough	1994 World Cup	Italy 2–1 Spain
24	18 November 1998	(Italy) Salerno	Friendly	Italy 2–2 Spain
25	29 March 2000	(Spain) Barcelona	Friendly	Spain 2–0 Italy
26	28 April 2004	(Italy) Genoa	Friendly	Italy 1–1 Spain
27	26 March 2008	(Spain) Elche	Friendly	Spain 1–0 Italy
28	22 June 2008	(Austria) Vienna	Euro 2008	Spain 0–0 Italy (Note: Spain won 4–2 on penalties after extra time.)
29	10 August 2011	(Italy) Bari	Friendly	Italy 2–1 Spain
30	10 June 2012	(Poland) Gdańsk	Euro 2012	Spain 1–1 Italy
31	1 July 2012	(Ukraine) Kyiv	Euro 2012	Spain 4–0 Italy
32	27 June 2013	(Brazil) Fortaleza	2013 Confederations Cup	Spain 0–0 Italy (Note: Spain won 7–6 on penalties after extra time.)
33	5 March 2014	(Spain) Madrid	Friendly	Spain 1–0 Italy
34	24 March 2016	(Italy) Udine	Friendly	Italy 1–1 Spain
35	27 June 2016	(France) Saint-Denis	Euro 2016	Italy 2–0 Spain
36	6 October 2016	(Italy) Turin	2018 World Cup qualification	Italy 1–1 Spain
37	2 September 2017	(Spain) Madrid	2018 World Cup qualification	Spain 3–0 Italy
38	6 July 2021	(England) London	Euro 2020	Italy 1–1 Spain (Note: Italy won 4–2 on penalties after extra time.)
39	6 October 2021	(Italy) Milan	2021 Nations League finals	Italy 1–2 Spain
40	15 June 2023	(Netherlands) Enschede	2023 Nations League finals	Spain 2–1 Italy
41	20 June 2024	(Germany) Gelsenkirchen	Euro 2024	Spain 1–0 Italy

== Comparison of Italy's and Spain's positions in major international tournaments ==
Key

Denotes which team finished better in that particular competition.
DNQ: Did not qualify.
DNP: Did not participate.
TBD: To be determined.

Tournament	Italy	Spain	Notes
1930 FIFA World Cup	DNP		
1934 FIFA World Cup	1st	5th	Italy and Spain faced off in the quarter-final match which ended 1–1 and was replayed the following day where Italy won 1–0. Tournament played in Italy.
1938 FIFA World Cup	1st	DNP	
1950 FIFA World Cup	7th	4th	
1954 FIFA World Cup	10th	DNP	
1958 FIFA World Cup	DNQ	DNP	
1960 European Nations' Cup	DNP	DNP	
1962 FIFA World Cup	9th	13th	
1964 European Nations' Cup	DNQ	1st	Tournament played in Spain.
1966 FIFA World Cup	9th	10th	
UEFA Euro 1968	1st	DNQ	Tournament played in Italy.
1970 FIFA World Cup	2nd	DNQ	
UEFA Euro 1972	DNQ	DNQ	
1974 FIFA World Cup	10th	DNQ	
UEFA Euro 1976	DNQ	DNQ	
1978 FIFA World Cup	4th	10th	
UEFA Euro 1980	4th	7th	Tournament played in Italy.
1982 FIFA World Cup	1st	12th	Tournament played in Spain.
UEFA Euro 1984	DNQ	2nd	
1986 FIFA World Cup	12th	7th	
UEFA Euro 1988	4th	6th	Italy beat Spain 1–0 in their group stage match up; Spain did not advance from the group, while Italy did.
1990 FIFA World Cup	3rd	10th	Tournament played in Italy.
UEFA Euro 1992	DNQ		
1994 FIFA World Cup	2nd	8th	Italy beat Spain 2–1 in the quarter-finals, eliminating them from the tournament.
UEFA Euro 1996	10th	6th	
1998 FIFA World Cup	5th	17th	
UEFA Euro 2000	2nd	5th	
2002 FIFA World Cup	15th	5th	
UEFA Euro 2004	9th	10th	
2006 FIFA World Cup	1st	9th	
UEFA Euro 2008	8th	1st	In the quarter-finals, Spain eliminated Italy 4–2 on penalties after a goalless draw.
2010 FIFA World Cup	26th	1st	
UEFA Euro 2012	2nd	1st	Italy and Spain were matched up in the group stage, which ended 1–1 and later faced off in the final, in which Spain defeated Italy 4–0.
2014 FIFA World Cup	22nd	23rd	
UEFA Euro 2016	5th	10th	In the round of 16, Italy defeated Spain 2–0, eliminating them from the tournament.
2018 FIFA World Cup	DNQ	10th	
UEFA Euro 2020	1st	3rd	In the semi-finals, Italy eliminated Spain 4–2 on penalties after a 1–1 draw. Some games of the tournament were played in Italy and Spain.
2022 FIFA World Cup	DNQ	13th	
UEFA Euro 2024	14th	1st	Italy faced Spain in the second match of the group stage, with both teams placed in Group B. Spain defeated Italy 1–0.
2026 FIFA World Cup	DNQ	1st	
UEFA Euro 2028	TBD	TBD	

== Major encounters ==
=== 1934 FIFA World Cup ===
On 31 May, Italy faced Spain in the quarter-final of the 1934 FIFA World Cup, where the two sides drew 1–1 after extra time with Spanish goal by Luis Regueiro in the 30th minute and Italian goal by Giovanni Ferrari in the 44th minute. They then faced off again in the replay match the following day to settle the team that advances; Italy won the replay 1–0 win the goal coming from Giuseppe Meazza in the 11th minute. Italy went on to win their first Fifa World Cup title.

31 May 1934
16:30 CEST

Italy	1–1 (a.e.t.)	Spain
Ferrari 44'	Report	Regueiro 30'

Stadio Giovanni Berta, Florence
Attendance: 35,000
Referee: Louis Baert (Belgium)

Replay

1 June 1934
16:30 CEST

Italy	1–0	Spain
Meazza 11'	Report

Stadio Giovanni Berta, Florence
Attendance: 43,000
Referee: René Mercet (Switzerland)

=== UEFA Euro 1988 ===
On 14 June, Italy and Spain were matched up for the second match in the group stage, where Italy won 1–0 with the goal coming from Gianluca Vialli in the 73rd minute. Italy went on to win their last group match, while Spain lost theirs; Italy made it out of the group, while Spain did not.

14 June 1988
20:15 CEST

Italy	1–0	Spain
Vialli 73'	Report

Waldstadion, Frankfurt
Attendance: 47,506
Referee: Erik Fredriksson (Sweden)

=== 1994 FIFA World Cup ===
On 9 July, Italy won the quarter-final match up against Spain in the 1994 World Cup 2–1 quarter-final at Foxboro Stadium, with Italian Dino Baggio scoring first in the 25th minute, the Spaniards equalised with a goal from José Luis Caminero in the 58th minute, before Roberto Baggio sealed the Italian victory in the 88th minute. A controversy in the match was Mauro Tassotti's elbow on Spanish player Luis Enrique, but during the match the incident went unpunished – Tassotti was later banned for eight games.

9 July 1994
12:00 PDT

Italy	2–1	Spain
D. Baggio 25'; R. Baggio 88'	Report	Caminero 58'

Foxboro Stadium, Foxborough
Attendance: 53,400
Referee: Sándor Puhl (Hungary)

=== UEFA Euro 2008 ===
On 22 June, Italy and Spain were matched up for a quarter-final in Euro 2008; the game ended a goalless draw after 120 minutes and resulted in a penalty shoot-out which Spain won 4–2. Spain went on to win the European Championship for the second time.

22 June 2008
20:45 CEST

Spain	0–0 (a.e.t.)	Italy
	Report
Penalties
Villa (penalty scored); Cazorla (penalty scored); Senna (penalty scored); Güiza (penalty missed); Fàbregas (penalty scored)	4–2	(penalty scored) Grosso; (penalty missed) De Rossi; (penalty scored) Camoranesi; (penalty missed) Di Natale

Ernst-Happel-Stadion, Vienna
Attendance: 48,000
Referee: Herbert Fandel (Germany)

=== UEFA Euro 2012 ===
On 1 July, Spain and Italy were matched up for the final of Euro 2012. The sides had already met in the group stage, drawing 1–1. Spain took the lead in the 14th minute, though, when Andrés Iniesta played a through-ball to Cesc Fàbregas, who drove past Italian defender Giorgio Chiellini to the by-line before pulling back a cross for David Silva to head into the net from six yards. Chiellini was clearly struggling with a thigh injury he had picked up in the earlier rounds, and he was replaced by Federico Balzaretti after 20 minutes. Italy responded with a couple of shots from Antonio Cassano that were saved by Spain goalkeeper Iker Casillas, but Spain doubled their lead before half-time when Xavi picked out left-back Jordi Alba, who capped a long forward run with a precise finish past Gianluigi Buffon in the Italy goal.

Antonio Di Natale came on for Cassano at half-time and twice went close to scoring, the second effort forcing a save from the onrushing Casillas. Italy's final substitution saw Thiago Motta replace Riccardo Montolivo, but he soon suffered a hamstring injury; with all of their substitutes used, Italy had to play the last 30 minutes of the match with ten men. Fernando Torres replaced Fàbregas with 15 minutes left to play, and scored in the 84th minute – assisted by Xavi – to become the first man to score in two European Championship finals. Torres then turned provider four minutes later, cutting the ball back with the outside of his boot for fellow substitute and Chelsea forward Juan Mata to sweep into an empty net for a final score of 4–0, the widest margin of victory in any European Championship final. Spain became the first team to retain the European Championship title and also the first European team to win three major international competitions in a row.

10 June 2012
18:00 CEST
Group stage

Spain	1–1	Italy
Fàbregas 64'	Report	Di Natale 61'

PGE Arena, Gdańsk
Attendance: 38,869
Referee: Viktor Kassai (Hungary)

1 July 2012
21:45 EEST
Final

Spain	4–0	Italy
Silva 14'; Alba 41'; Fern. Torres 84'; Mata 88'	Report

Olympic Stadium, Kyiv
Attendance: 63,170
Referee: Pedro Proença (Portugal)

=== 2013 FIFA Confederations Cup ===
On 22 June, Italy and Spain faced off in the semi-final of the 2013 Confederations Cup hosted by Brazil. The game finished 0-0 after 120 minutes, with Spain edging Italy, this time 7–6 on penalties. Italy still then beat out Uruguay in the third-place position, while Spain lost to the host nation Brazil in the final, ending their world-record 29-game unbeaten streak in competitive matches.

27 June 2013
16:00

Spain	0–0 (a.e.t.)	Italy
	Report
Penalties
Xavi (penalty scored); Iniesta (penalty scored); Piqué (penalty scored); Ramos (penalty scored); Mata (penalty scored); Busquets (penalty scored); Navas (penalty scored)	7–6	(penalty scored) Candreva; (penalty scored) Aquilani; (penalty scored) De Rossi; (penalty scored) Giovinco; (penalty scored) Pirlo; (penalty scored) Montolivo; (penalty missed) Bonucci

Estádio Castelão, Fortaleza
Attendance: 56,083
Referee: Howard Webb (England)

=== UEFA Euro 2016 ===
On 27 June, Italy and Spain matched up for the round of 16 in the Euro 2016, in a rematch of the previous tournament's final and the group game, both four years ago. Italy won 2–0 with goals from Giorgio Chiellini in the 33rd minute and Graziano Pellè in stoppage time of the second half. Spanish goalkeeper David de Gea made several impressive saves to keep Spain in the match, notably on Pellè's first-half header attempt, however, it ultimately ended in defeat, eliminating the two-time defending European champions Spain.

27 June 2016
18:00 CEST

Italy	2–0	Spain
Chiellini 33'; Pellè 90+1'	Report

Stade de France, Saint-Denis
Attendance: 76,165
Referee: Cüneyt Çakır (Turkey)

=== 2018 FIFA World Cup qualification ===
The two teams were drawn together for 2018 FIFA World Cup qualification, in UEFA Group G. In the rematches of the last four matches of the UEFA European Championships, Italy and Spain drew 1–1 in the first leg in Turin and then Spain defeated Italy 3–0 in the return leg in Madrid.

6 October 2016
20:45
(20:45 UTC+2)

Italy	1–1	Spain
De Rossi 82' (pen.)	Report (FIFA); Report (UEFA)	Vitolo 55'

Juventus Stadium, Turin
Attendance: 38,470
Referee: Felix Brych (Germany)

2 September 2017
20:45
(20:45 UTC+2)

Spain	3–0	Italy
Isco 14', 40'; Morata 77'	Report (FIFA); Report (UEFA)

Santiago Bernabéu, Madrid
Attendance: 73,628
Referee: Björn Kuipers (Netherlands)

=== UEFA Euro 2020 ===
On 6 July 2021, Italy and Spain faced each other in the semi-finals of the Euro 2020 (held in 2021 due to the COVID-19 pandemic) at Wembley Stadium in London, marking the fourth consecutive European Championship that the sides meet. Italy and Spain, could not break the deadlock after 120 minutes, and Italy won 4–2 in the resulting penalty shoot-out en route to their first European title in 53 years and their first major international football title in 15 years.

6 July 2021
21:00 CEST

Italy	1–1 (a.e.t.)	Spain
Chiesa 60'	Report	Morata 80'
Penalties
Locatelli (penalty missed); Belotti (penalty scored); Bonucci (penalty scored); Bernardeschi (penalty scored); Jorginho (penalty scored)	4–2	(penalty missed) Olmo; (penalty scored) Gerard; (penalty scored) Thiago; (penalty missed) Morata

Wembley Stadium, London
Attendance: 57,811
Referee: Felix Brych (Germany)

=== UEFA Euro 2024 ===
On 20 June 2024, Italy and Spain faced each other in the second match of Group B, the fifth consecutive European Championships they played each other. Spain won 1–0 through a Riccardo Calafiori own goal, marking their first victory over Italy in a major tournament since the Euro 2012 final. Spain would go on to lift the European Championship for a record fourth time.

20 June 2024
21:00 CEST

Spain	1–0	Italy
Calafiori 55' (o.g.)	Report

Arena AufSchalke, Gelsenkirchen
Attendance: 49,528
Referee: Slavko Vinčić (Slovenia)

== Statistics ==
=== Overall ===
As of 19 July 2026

Competition	Matches	Wins		Draws	Goals	
Competition	Matches	Italy	Spain	Draws	Italy	Spain
FIFA World Cup	3	2	0	1	4	2
FIFA World Cup qualifiers	2	0	1	1	1	4
UEFA European Championship	8	2	2	4 (Note: Spain defeated Italy in the Euro 2008 quarter-finals 4–2 on penalties after a 0–0 draw in 120 minutes. Italy defeated Spain in the Euro 2020 semi-finals 4–2 on penalties after a 1–1 draw in 120 minutes.)	5	7
UEFA Nations League	2	0	2	0	2	4
FIFA Confederations Cup	1	0	0	1 (Note: Spain defeated Italy in the 2013 Confederations Cup semi-finals 7–6 on penalties after a 0–0 draw in 120 minutes.)	0	0
Summer Olympics	4	2	1	1	9	4
All competitions	20	6	6	8	21	21
Friendly	21	5	8	8	25	25
All matches	41	11	14	16	46	46

=== Trophies ===
Competition	Titles	
Competition	Italy	Spain
FIFA World Cup	4	2
UEFA European Championship	2	4
UEFA Nations League	0	1
FIFA Confederations Cup	0	0
Summer Olympics	1	2
All competitions	7	9

== See also ==
- Football derbies in Italy
- Italy–Spain relations
- List of association football rivalries
