= List of UEFA European Championship finals =

UEFA European Championship final
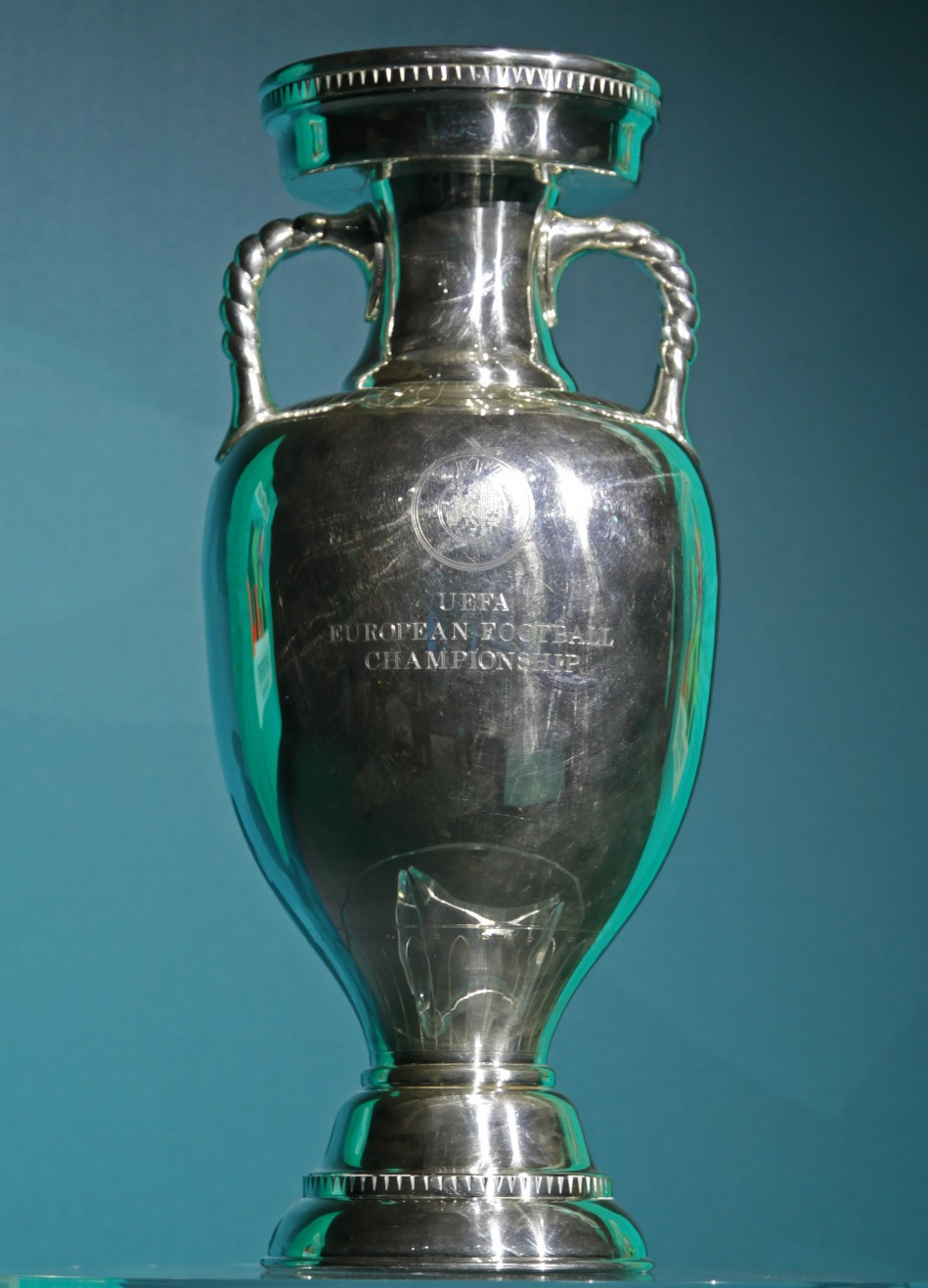
- The European Championship trophy
- Founded: 1960
- Region: Europe (UEFA)
- Current champions: Spain (4th title)
- Most championships: Spain (4 titles)

The UEFA European Championship is an association football competition established in 1960. It is contested by the men's national teams of the members of the Union of European Football Associations (UEFA), the sport's European governing body, and takes place every four years. (Note: The UEFA Euro 2020 tournament was postponed to 2021 due to the COVID-19 pandemic.)

The European Championship final is the last match of the competition, and the result determines which country's team is declared European champion. It is a one-off match decided in regulation time. In the event of a draw, extra time is played. If scores are then still level, a penalty shoot-out determines the winner, as per the rules since 1976; prior to that, finals still tied after extra time would be replayed, as was the case with the 1968 final. During extra time, the golden goal rule (by which the first team to score won the match) applied in 1996 and 2000, and the silver goal rule (by which a team could win the match by winning the first half of extra time) would have applied in 2004 but was not put in practice. The winners are awarded a replica of the trophy (the original remains with UEFA), while the losing finalists (and semi-finalists) are presented with a plaque. Gold and silver medals are awarded to the players of the winning and losing finalists respectively.

Spain is the most successful team in the history of the tournament with four titles, followed by Germany with three wins. France and Italy have won the competition twice, while six other teams, the Soviet Union, Czechoslovakia, the Netherlands, Denmark, Greece, and Portugal, have triumphed once. Yugoslavia, Belgium and England have qualified for the final without success.

The winners of the first ever final, held in Paris in 1960, were the Soviet Union, who defeated Yugoslavia 2–1 after extra time, while in the latest one, hosted in Berlin in 2024, Spain defeated England 2–1.

== History ==
The first final of the UEFA European Football Championship (then referred to as the European Nations' Cup final) was contested in July 1960 in Paris between the Soviet Union and Yugoslavia. Milan Galić scored for Yugoslavia just before half-time but Slava Metreveli equalised soon after the break, and the scores remained level, sending the game into extra time. With seven minutes left, Viktor Ponedelnik won the match for the Soviet Union, scoring the winner with a header. The 1960 champions qualified for the final of the 1964 tournament, where they faced hosts Spain. Chus Pereda scored early for the home side, but the match was levelled two minutes later when Galimzyan Khusainov equalised. Nearly 80,000 spectators at the Santiago Bernabéu Stadium in Madrid had to wait for the winner which came six minutes from time, courtesy of a header from Spaniard Marcelino.

The hosts, Italy, faced Yugoslavia in the final of the 1968 tournament, now rebranded as the European Football Championship. Italy had qualified for the final by virtue of winning a coin toss following their goalless semi-final against the Soviet Union. The final ended 1–1, forcing a replay to be conducted two days later. This time Italy triumphed, winning 2–0 with first-half goals from Gigi Riva and Pietro Anastasi. Four years later, the final, held in Brussels, produced a record winning margin that would last for 44 years. The Soviet Union, finalists for the third time in four tournaments, were defeated 3–0 by West Germany with Gerd Müller and Herbert Wimmer scoring the winning goals. The incumbent champions qualified for the final of the 1976 tournament, where they faced Czechoslovakia. A late equaliser from German Bernd Hölzenbein to make it 2–2 saw the game go into extra time and eventually to a penalty shoot-out. After seven successful conversions, Uli Hoeneß missed, leaving Czechoslovak Antonín Panenka with the opportunity to score and win the tournament. An "audacious" chipped shot, described by UEFA as "perhaps the most famous spot kick of all time" secured the victory as Czechoslovakia won 5–3 on penalties.

Four years later, the final returned to the Stadio Olimpico where West Germany, in their third consecutive final, faced Belgium. Horst Hrubesch scored early in the first half before René Vandereycken equalised for Belgium with a penalty in the second half. With two minutes remaining, Hrubesch headed West Germany into the lead from a Karl-Heinz Rummenigge corner, securing his country's second victory in the championship. The 1984 final, in Paris, featured hosts France against 1964 champions Spain. Two second-half goals, one each from Michel Platini and Bruno Bellone, secured a home victory; Platini ended the tournament with nine goals, the most scored in the championship finals by any player to date. The Netherlands qualified for their first final in the 1988 tournament in West Germany, where they faced the Soviet Union who were playing in their fourth final. Ruud Gullit scored in the first half and Marco van Basten doubled the lead in the second for the Netherlands with a volley which has since been described variously as "stunning", "spectacular", and the "best goal scored in the competition's history". With a 2–0 victory, the Netherlands secured their first "major" title.

Following Yugoslavia's expulsion from the competition in 1992, Denmark were invited to take their place and qualified for the final where they faced a team from the newly reunified Germany. Goals from John Jensen and Kim Vilfort secured a 2–0 victory for the Danes in their first and only European final. Wembley Stadium hosted the final of the 1996 tournament, where the Czech Republic and Germany were forced into extra time after an Oliver Bierhoff goal equalised Patrik Berger's penalty for the Czech Republic. Five minutes into extra time, Bierhoff scored his and Germany's second, and the first golden goal in the history of the tournament, securing Germany's third European title 2–1. The 2000 tournament was also decided by a golden goal. France, who had won the 1998 FIFA World Cup, met Italy in the Feijnoord Stadion in the Netherlands, both nations making their second appearance in the final. A second-half goal from Marco Delvecchio saw Italy take a 1–0 lead into injury time, when Sylvain Wiltord scored a "last-gasp" equaliser to send the match into extra time. David Trezeguet's volley 13 minutes into extra time ensured that France were both European and World champions.

The 2004 competition saw, according to UEFA, "one of the biggest shocks in tournament history" as Greece defeated hosts Portugal 1–0 in the final. Despite never having won a match in a "major tournament", a second-half goal from striker Angelos Charisteas caused "one of the biggest upsets in soccer history". Germany qualified for their sixth final in 2008, and faced Spain in a tournament co-hosted by Austria and Switzerland. A first-half strike from Fernando Torres was the only goal of the game, and helped Spain win their first European trophy in 44 years. The 2012 tournament final saw reigning European and World champions Spain face Italy in Kyiv. Two first-half goals, one each from David Silva and Jordi Alba put the defending champions 2–0 ahead at half-time. Fifteen minutes into the second half, and four minutes after being brought on as a substitute, Thiago Motta was stretchered off as Italy were reduced to ten men for the remainder of the second half. Fernando Torres scored a third, becoming the first player to score in two European Championship finals, and then provided an assist for Juan Mata who scored with a minute to go, the final ending 4–0. Spain's third victory in the final equalled Germany as the most successful team in the tournament's history, and they became the first team to defend the European Football Championship title. Portugal became the 10th different team to win the European Championships in 2016, when they beat France 1–0 in the final at the Stade de France in Saint-Denis; the match went goalless after 90 minutes, before Eder scored the winning goal four minutes into the second period.

In UEFA Euro 2020, which was actually held in 2021 due to the COVID-19 pandemic in Europe, Italy won their second title after beating first-time finalists England on penalties. England renewed their participation in the UEFA Euro 2024 final, held in the Olympiastadion in Berlin, where three–time winners Spain won 2–1 courtesy of a Nico Williams strike at the start of the second half and a 86th-minute winner by Mikel Oyarzabal, after a Cole Palmer equaliser for England. As a result, Spain won a record–breaking fourth European Championship and their third since 2008.

== List of finals ==
Key to the list
a.e.t.	Result after extra time
g.g.	Match was won with a golden goal during extra time
pen.	Match was won on a penalty shoot-out
re.	Match was won after a replay

List of finals of the European Championship
Year	Winners	Score	Runners-up	Venue	Location	Attendance	References
1960	Soviet Union	2–1 (a.e.t.)	Yugoslavia	Parc des Princes	Paris, France	17,966	
1964	Spain	2–1	Soviet Union	Santiago Bernabéu Stadium	Madrid, Spain	79,115	
1968	Italy	1–1 (a.e.t.)	Yugoslavia	Stadio Olimpico	Rome, Italy	68,817	
1968	Italy	2–0 (re.)	Yugoslavia	Stadio Olimpico	Rome, Italy	32,886	
1972	West Germany	3–0	Soviet Union	Heysel Stadium	Brussels, Belgium	43,066	
1976	Czechoslovakia	2–2 (a.e.t.) (5–3 pen.)	West Germany	Stadion FK Crvena Zvezda	Belgrade, Yugoslavia	30,790	
1980	West Germany	2–1	Belgium	Stadio Olimpico	Rome, Italy	47,860	
1984	France	2–0	Spain	Parc des Princes	Paris, France	47,368	
1988	Netherlands	2–0	Soviet Union	Olympiastadion	Munich, West Germany	62,770	
1992	Denmark	2–0	Germany	Ullevi	Gothenburg, Sweden	37,800	
1996	Germany	2–1 (g.g.)	Czech Republic	Wembley Stadium	London, England	73,611	
2000	France	2–1 (g.g.)	Italy	Stadion Feijenoord	Rotterdam, Netherlands	48,200	
2004	Greece	1–0	Portugal	Estádio da Luz	Lisbon, Portugal	62,865	
2008	Spain	1–0	Germany	Ernst-Happel-Stadion	Vienna, Austria	51,428	
2012	Spain	4–0	Italy	Olimpiyskiy National Sports Complex	Kyiv, Ukraine	63,170	
2016	Portugal	1–0 (a.e.t.)	France	Stade de France	Saint-Denis (Paris), France	75,868	
2020	Italy	1–1 (a.e.t.) (3–2 pen.)	England	Wembley Stadium	London, England	67,173	
2024	Spain	2–1	England	Olympiastadion	Berlin, Germany	65,600	
2028				Wembley Stadium	London, England		

== Results by nation ==
Map of winning countries

Team	Winners	Runners-up	Years won	Years runners-up
Spain	4	1	1964, 2008, 2012, 2024	1984
Germany (Note: Three final appearances as West Germany.)	3	3	1972, 1980, 1996	1976, 1992, 2008
Italy	2	2	1968, 2020	2000, 2012
France	2	1	1984, 2000	2016
Soviet Union	1	3	1960	1964, 1972, 1988
Portugal	1	1	2016	2004
Czechoslovakia	1	0	1976	—
Netherlands	1	0	1988	—
Denmark	1	0	1992	—
Greece	1	0	2004	—
Yugoslavia	0	2	—	1960, 1968
England	0	2	—	2020, 2024
Belgium	0	1	—	1980
Czech Republic	0	1	—	1996

== See also ==
- List of FIFA World Cup finals
- List of FIFA Confederations Cup finals
- List of Copa América finals
- List of AFC Asian Cup finals
- List of Africa Cup of Nations finals
- List of CONCACAF Gold Cup finals
- List of OFC Nations Cup finals
