= UEFA Euro 2012 final =

Final game of the UEFA Euro 2012

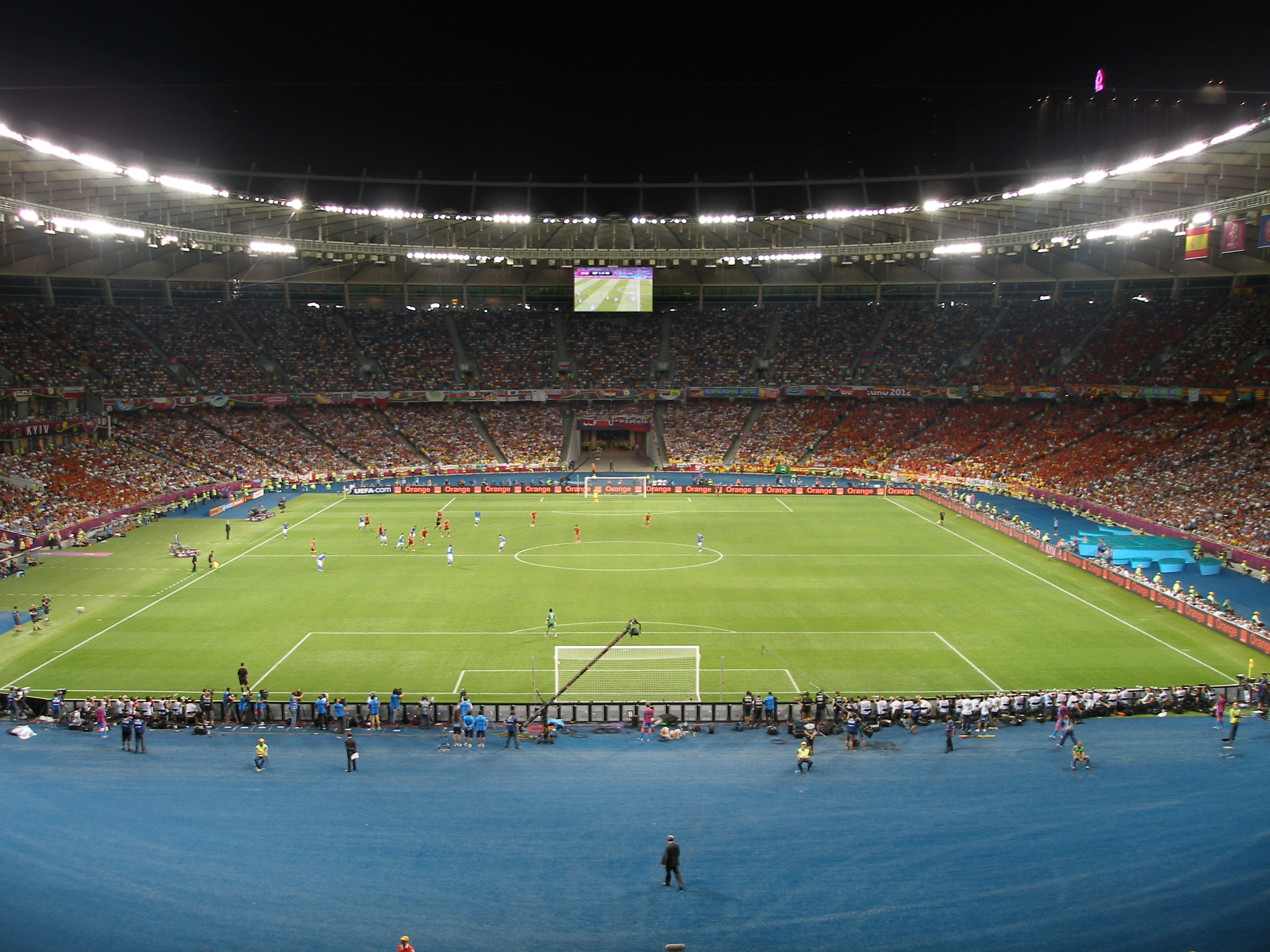
- The Olympic Stadium in Kyiv hosted the final.
- Event: UEFA Euro 2012
Spain	Italy
4	0
- Date: 1 July 2012
- Venue: Olympic Stadium, Kyiv
- Man of the Match: Andrés Iniesta (Spain)
- Referee: Pedro Proença (Portugal)
- Attendance: 63,170
- Weather: Clear night 26 °C (79 °F); 42% humidity

The UEFA Euro 2012 final was the final match of Euro 2012, the fourteenth edition of the European Championship, UEFA's competition for national football teams. The match was played at the Olympic Stadium in Kyiv, Ukraine, on 1 July 2012, and was contested between defending champions Spain and Italy.

The sixteen-team tournament began with a group stage, from which eight teams qualified for the knockout stage. En route to the final, Spain finished top of Group C, with a draw against Italy and wins over Croatia and the Republic of Ireland. Spain then defeated France in the quarter-finals, and Portugal in the semi-finals on penalties. Italy were second in Group C, with draws against Spain and Croatia, and a victory over the Republic of Ireland. In the knockout stage, Italy defeated England on penalties in the quarter-finals, and Germany in the semi-finals. This was thus the fourth time that teams who played each other in the group stage faced off again in the Euro final (after 1988, 1996 and 2004).

The final took place in front of 63,170 supporters, and was refereed by Pedro Proença from Portugal. Spain won the match 4–0, the greatest margin of victory in European Championship final history, earning a joint-record third title and becoming the first team to win two consecutive European Championships. Spain's Andrés Iniesta was named as UEFA's man of the match.

Spain also became the first team to win three consecutive major tournaments (following Euro 2008 and the 2010 FIFA World Cup), all without conceding a single goal in the knockout stage. Usually, the winners of the European Championship gained entry to the FIFA Confederations Cup, which was played in Brazil in 2013. However, since Spain had already qualified as the 2010 World Cup champions, runners-up Italy qualified automatically as the UEFA representative.

== Background ==
UEFA Euro 2012 was the fourteenth edition of the UEFA European Football Championship, UEFA's football competition for national teams, held between 8 June and 1 July 2012 in Poland and Ukraine. Qualifying rounds were held between August 2010 and November 2011, in which fifty-one teams were divided into nine groups of five or six, playing each other on a home-and-away round-robin tournament basis. The top team in each group, along with the two host teams, qualified for the sixteen-team finals, with the remainder of the sixteen qualifying via two-legged play-offs. In the finals, the qualified teams were divided into four groups of four with each side playing each other once. The two top teams from each group advanced to a knock-out phase.

Spain were reigning European champions, having won the European Championship in 2008. They had also secured the title on one other occasion, defeating the Soviet Union 2–1 in the 1964 final, and were runners-up in the 1984 final. Similarly, Italy won the title in 1968, defeating Yugoslavia 2–0 in the final, and were runners-up in 2000, losing 2–1 to France in the final. Before the tournament, the two sides had previously met each other 30 times, Italy winning ten games and Spain eight. Italy won the most recent meeting, a 2–1 friendly on 10 August 2011 at the Stadio San Nicola in Bari. Spain, who began the tournament as one of the favourites, ranked highest in the FIFA World Rankings, while Italy ranked twelfth overall, and eighth among UEFA teams.

The Olympic Stadium in Kyiv, Ukraine, the largest stadium of the eight Euro 2012 venues, was selected as the venue for the final, after a meeting held in Ukraine on 25 June 2007. Built in 1923, the 63,195-capacity stadium had been renovated for the tournament, during which a transparent roof had been installed. The Olympic Stadium had hosted three Euro 2012 group matches along with one of the quarter-finals.

== Route to the final ==
=== Spain ===
Group stage and knockouts
	Opponent	Result
1	Italy	1–1
2	Republic of Ireland	4–0
3	Croatia	1–0
QF	France	2–0
SF	Portugal	0–0 (a.e.t.) (4–2 p)

Spain were drawn in Group C alongside Italy, Croatia, and Republic of Ireland, opening against Italy on 10 June 2012. Italy took the lead in the 61st minute through striker Antonio Di Natale, who had come on for Mario Balotelli. Three minutes later, Spain equalised when midfielder David Silva assisted Cesc Fàbregas, who slotted the ball past goalkeeper Gianluigi Buffon. In their next match on 14 June against Republic of Ireland, striker Fernando Torres opened the scoring early in the fourth minute, retaining the ball after Republic of Ireland defender Richard Dunne's unsuccessful tackle, before scoring from ten yards past defenceless goalkeeper Shay Given. In the 49th minute, after Given had blocked an Iniesta shot, David Silva collected the rebound and extended the Spanish lead, after nutmegging three defenders. With 20 minutes remaining, Torres scored his second goal, taking a pass from Silva and chipping the ball over Given. Fabregas scored the final goal after receiving a Silva corner and shooting from a difficult angle. Their third and final group stage match against Croatia on 18 June, proved to be more difficult, and Croatia had several goalscoring chances, notably from Ivan Strinić and Ivan Perišić, which Spain goalkeeper Iker Casillas had no problems dealing with. The match looked to be heading for a draw, until the 88th minute, when substitute Jesús Navas struck the winning goal, from an Iniesta assist.

In the quarter-finals, on 23 June 2012, Spain took on France. Spain opened the goalscoring with defender Jordi Alba running to the touchline under pressure and sending a pinpoint cross to unmarked midfielder Xabi Alonso, who drove a powerful header past goalkeeper Hugo Lloris. Spain completed their win late in the second half with Alonso's penalty kick after France defender Anthony Réveillère brought down Pedro inside the penalty area. In the semi-finals on 27 June, Spain faced Portugal in a competitive match. Portugal pressured the Spanish "tiki-taka" possession game high up the pitch, and created several goalscoring chances. Spain managed to hold on, which required the match to go into extra time. Spain began to take control of the match with the introduction of Pedro and Fabregas, but failed to score over both halves, leading to a penalty shoot-out. Alonso, who had previously taken a penalty kick against France, had his spot kick saved by Portugal goalkeeper Rui Patrício. Portugal looked to take the advantage, with midfielder João Moutinho as the next penalty taker, but his strike was kept out with a diving save from Casillas. Iniesta took his penalty with precision before Portuguese defender Pepe struck his kick just past Casillas's fingertips. Defender Gerard Piqué calmly scored in the same corner of the goal as Pepe. Another defender, Bruno Alves, stepped up to take the third penalty for Portugal, but midfielder Nani encouraged Alves to let him take the penalty, which Nani struck high in the left corner of the goal after sending Casillas the wrong way. The fourth Spanish penalty was taken by defender Sergio Ramos, who chipped the ball past Rui Patrício, in the style of former Czech footballer Antonín Panenka. Portugal's fourth penalty was taken by defender Bruno Alves, who struck the crossbar with a rising shot. Spain's final penalty taker was Fàbregas, who scored Spain's fifth goal, as the ball went in via the left post. Spain emerged victorious, and headed to the UEFA European Championship final for the fourth time.

=== Italy ===
Group stage and knockouts
	Opponent	Result
1	Spain	1–1
2	Croatia	1–1
3	Republic of Ireland	2–0
QF	England	0–0 (a.e.t.) (4–2 p)
SF	Germany	2–1

As well as Spain, Italy were placed in Group C in the group stage. Their opening match was against Spain on 10 June 2012 which ended in a 1–1 draw. Di Natale gave Italy the lead on the hour mark but Spain equalised through Fàbregas four minutes later. Italy's next fixture was against Croatia on 14 June. Italy were dominant in the first half of the match, and had several chances to score. A foul from Croatia midfielder Ivan Rakitić on Balotelli resulted in a free kick for Italy. Andrea Pirlo stepped up, and struck the free kick, which went past Croatia goalkeeper Stipe Pletikosa, inside the left side of the goal. In the 72nd minute, Croatia striker Mario Mandžukić headed in an equalising goal, after an assist from Strinić. Their third and final group match against the Republic of Ireland was on 18 June. Striker Antonio Cassano struck the first goal, from a Pirlo corner, which Republic of Ireland defender Damien Duff failed to clear. Near the end of the match, centre midfielder Keith Andrews was booked for the second time, after committing a foul on Pirlo, resulting in a sending off by Turkey referee Cüneyt Çakır. As the match headed its way into the 90 minutes, in injury time, Balotelli struck a volley past Given, assisted by attacking midfielder Alessandro Diamanti.

In the quarter-finals, Italy faced England. Both sides were dominant and had possession in the first half. Italy players, such as midfielders Riccardo Montolivo, Pirlo, Balotelli, and Cassano had chances to score, but failed to do so. England players also rounded off chances, through strikers Wayne Rooney and Danny Welbeck, midfielders Steven Gerrard and Scott Parker, and defenders Glen Johnson and Ashley Cole. In the second half, Italy proved to be the more dominant, but neither managed to produce a goal, and the match was taken into extra time. Diamanti had the best chance to score in the first half, the ball hitting the outside of the left post. Both sides still failed to score and the match headed into a penalty shoot-out. Balotelli was the first penalty taker for Italy and he struck the penalty kick into the left corner, past England goalkeeper and Manchester City club teammate Joe Hart. Gerrard did not hesitate, and scored into the same left corner. Montolivo was the second player for Italy to take a penalty kick. He attempted to strike the ball into the same corner, but his shot went wide. He was followed by Rooney, who scored to put England ahead. Pirlo was the next Italian penalty taker and scored with a Panenka-style penalty. Midfielder Ashley Young stepped up to take England's third penalty, but hit the crossbar. Italy now had the advantage, as Antonio Nocerino successfully scored the fourth penalty. The pressure was now on England, and it proved to be decisive for Italy, as defender Cole stepped up to take the fourth penalty for England, which Buffon saved. In the semi-finals, Italy faced Germany. Italy dominated possession early, and after receiving the ball from Cassano, Balotelli opening the goalscoring in the 20th minute of the first half in the left corner inside the goal, heading past German goalkeeper Manuel Neuer. Sixteen minutes later Balotelli struck again, this time striking into the top right corner on a one-on-one with Neuer, assisted by a Montolivo lob over the German defence. In the second half, Germany improved, and were awarded a penalty in the 90th minute after Federico Balzaretti was penalised for handball. Germany midfielder Mesut Özil struck the penalty kick into the right corner. Despite this, Italy held on to their lead, securing victory and progression to the final.

== Pre-match ==
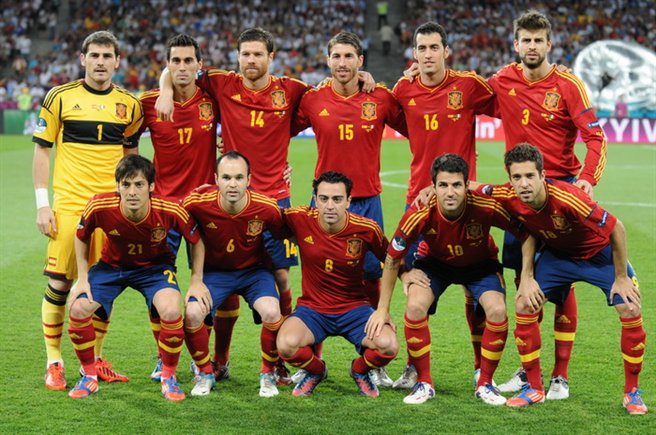
Spain's starting line-up in the final

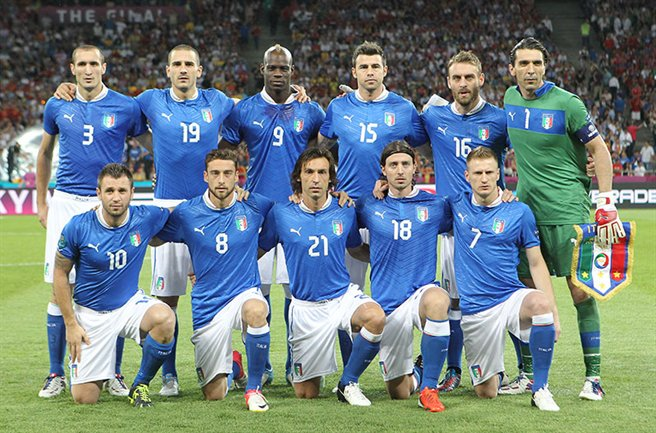
Italy's starting line-up in the final

Pedro Proença, representing the Portuguese Football Federation, was chosen by UEFA to referee the final. Proença had previously been in charge of two UEFA finals, the 2004 UEFA Under-19 Championship Final between Turkey and Spain, and the 2012 UEFA Champions League Final between Chelsea and Bayern Munich. He had also refereed nine other Champions League matches, and 18 UEFA Cup and Europa League matches. Proença was accompanied by assistant referees Bertino Miranda, Ricardo Santos, Jorge Sousa and Duarte Gomes. The fourth official was Turkish referee Cüneyt Çakır.

Spain coach Vicente del Bosque picked the same eleven players for the final as had played in the group match between the two sides and their quarter-final against France, played in a 4–3–3 formation. The only debate was over whether Fàbregas, a natural midfielder, would start up front (as he had against Italy and France), or if Del Bosque would pick one of Torres (who had started against Republic of Ireland and Croatia) or Álvaro Negredo (who played up front in the semi-final against Portugal). Spain's defence consisted largely of Real Madrid players – Casillas in goal, Álvaro Arbeloa on the right side of defence and Ramos in the centre. Barcelona's Piqué joined Ramos in the centre and Alba of Valencia played on the left. The central midfield featured Xavi and Sergio Busquets of Barcelona and Real Madrid's Alonso, with the flanks patrolled by Iniesta (also of Barcelona) on the left and Silva of Manchester City. Silva and Alba were the only two players to not play for Real Madrid or Barcelona in the starting line-up.

In contrast with Spain's tactical stability, Italy had used different line-ups throughout the tournament, brought about by both injury and suspension. However, after the first two group games, coach Cesare Prandelli appeared to develop a distinct preference for a 4–1–3–2 formation, with playmaker Pirlo occupying the deep midfield role. He also tended to favour a forward pairing of Cassano and Balotelli. Midfielder Daniele De Rossi had occupied a sweeper role in the first two group games, but was later used as a left-sided attacking midfielder. Goalkeeper Buffon, left-back Giorgio Chiellini, and centre-backs Andrea Barzagli and Leonardo Bonucci formed a Juventus core to the defence, having gone the entire 2011–12 Serie A season unbeaten. They were supported on the right by Milan's Ignazio Abate, who returned to the team after missing the semi-final through injury, replacing Balzaretti of Palermo. Pirlo, also of Juventus, again played the deep-lying playmaker role behind his club-mate Claudio Marchisio on the right wing, Milan's Montolivo in the centre and Daniele De Rossi of Roma on the left. Milan's Cassano and Manchester City's Balotelli again played up front.

Before the start of the match, the closing ceremonies were held, featuring a live performance by six hundred volunteer performers, performing a field march of a football match. Also featured was a performance by German pop singer Oceana, performing the official theme to Euro 2012, "Endless Summer". The official match ball for the final was the Adidas Tango 12 Finale, a silver-coloured variation of the Adidas Tango 12, and part of the Adidas Tango family. The Tango 12 was used as the official match ball throughout the tournament, provided by German sports equipment company Adidas. It is designed to be easier to dribble and control than the reportedly unpredictable Adidas Jabulani used at the 2010 World Cup.

== Match ==
=== First half ===
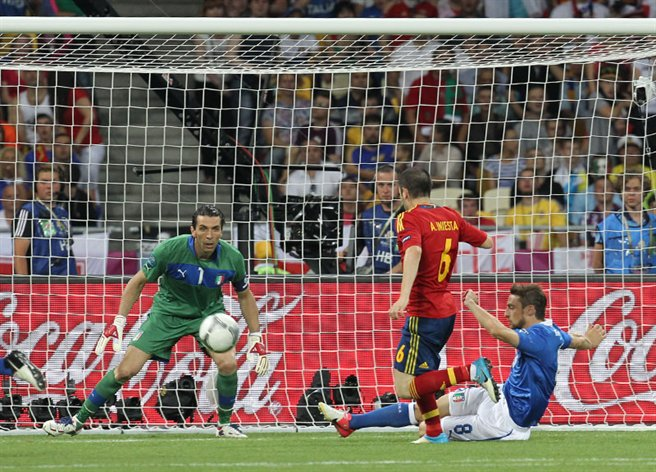
Iniesta takes a shot on Gianluigi Buffon's goal

Spain kicked off the match at 9:45 pm local time (6:45 pm UTC), playing in a red and dark blue kit, while Italy wore blue shirts and white shorts. Italy had the game's first attack on 2 minutes, Cassano running down the left of the pitch to the corner of the penalty area before losing the ball, which flew towards the centre of the pitch. Pirlo then had a shot from distance, but it went high and wide. On 4 minutes, Spain went forward for the first time, Silva advancing down the right before passing towards Alonso on the edge of Italy's penalty area. Italy's defence got the ball back to their goalkeeper, and it was then cleared by Chiellini. A minute later, Chiellini hit a long ball towards the Italian penalty area towards Balotelli, but Ramos reached it first with a header and was able to clear. Balotelli was knocked over during the challenge, but there was no foul given. Spain then began to control the match, with lengthy periods of possession and several chances to score, including a header by Ramos that went over the crossbar, and a shot by Xavi from a Fàbregas pass, which also went over.

Spain took the lead in the 14th minute, when Iniesta played a through-ball to Fàbregas, who drove past Chiellini to the by-line before pulling back a cross for David Silva to head into the net from six yards. Chiellini was hampered by a thigh injury he had picked up in the earlier rounds and on 20 minutes he sliced a clearance, allowing Alonso to launch an attack down the right. Bonucci and then Pirlo cleared the danger, after which Chiellini was replaced by Balzaretti. Italy responded to going behind with several attacks, first through Balzaretti, whose cross from the left was intercepted just before Balotelli could head it goalwards. Cassano then had two shots which were saved by Casillas on 29 and 33 minutes. On 38 minutes, Balotelli had another chance, firing a shot towards the top corner of the goal following a one-two with Montolivo; it went over the top. Spain then doubled their lead four minutes before half-time when, after a period of passing around their defence, Casillas sent a long ball which was eventually picked up by Xavi. He then passed to Alba, who capped a long forward run with a left-footed finish past Buffon.

=== Second half ===
Di Natale came on for Cassano at half-time and went close to scoring with his first touch one minute into the second half, heading over the crossbar after a cross from Abate. This was followed a minute later by a chance for Spain, when Fàbregas fired a shot from the edge of the penalty area which went narrowly wide of the goal. Fàbregas then crossed into the penalty area after beating Balzaretti on the right-hand side, leading to a goal-mouth scramble which was eventually cleared by Italy. On 49 minutes, the ball struck Bonucci's hand and Spain appealed for a penalty, but the referee deemed it unintentional. Di Natale then had a second effort, striking a shot from 12 yards (11 m) and forcing a save from the onrushing Casillas. Italy's final substitution saw Thiago Motta replace Riccardo Montolivo. In the 58th minute, Pirlo sent a free kick into the penalty area which was cleared by Casillas with his palms, and then Balotelli hit a shot which went over the crossbar. Motta then suffered a hamstring injury only four minutes after coming on; with all of their substitutes used, Italy had to play the last 30 minutes of the match a man down.

Torres replaced Fàbregas with 15 minutes left to play, and scored in the 84th minute – assisted by Xavi – to become the first man to score in two European Championship finals. Torres then turned provider four minutes later, cutting the ball back with the outside of his boot for fellow substitute and Chelsea forward Juan Mata to sweep into an empty net for a final score of 4–0.

=== Details ===
1 July 2012
21:45 EEST

Spain	4–0	Italy
Silva 14'; Alba 41'; Torres 84'; Mata 88'	Report

Olympic Stadium, Kyiv
Attendance: 63,170
Referee: Pedro Proença (Portugal)

Spain	Italy

GK	1	Iker Casillas (c)
RB	17	Álvaro Arbeloa
CB	3	Gerard Piqué	(yellow card) 25'
CB	15	Sergio Ramos
LB	18	Jordi Alba
DM	16	Sergio Busquets
CM	8	Xavi
CM	14	Xabi Alonso
CM	10	Cesc Fàbregas		(substituted off) 75'
AM	21	David Silva		(substituted off) 59'
AM	6	Andrés Iniesta		(substituted off) 87'
Substitutions:
FW	7	Pedro		(substituted on) 59'
FW	9	Fernando Torres		(substituted on) 75'
MF	13	Juan Mata		(substituted on) 87'
Manager:
Vicente del Bosque

GK	1	Gianluigi Buffon (c)
RB	7	Ignazio Abate
CB	15	Andrea Barzagli	(yellow card) 45'
CB	19	Leonardo Bonucci
LB	3	Giorgio Chiellini		(substituted off) 21'
DM	21	Andrea Pirlo
RW	8	Claudio Marchisio
AM	18	Riccardo Montolivo		(substituted off) 57'
LW	16	Daniele De Rossi
CF	9	Mario Balotelli
CF	10	Antonio Cassano		(substituted off) 46'
Substitutions:
DF	6	Federico Balzaretti		(substituted on) 21'
FW	11	Antonio Di Natale		(substituted on) 46'
MF	5	Thiago Motta		(substituted on) 57'
Manager:
Cesare Prandelli

Man of the Match:
Andrés Iniesta (Spain)

Assistant referees:
Bertino Miranda (Portugal)
Ricardo Santos (Portugal)
Fourth official:
Cüneyt Çakır (Turkey)
Additional assistant referees:
Jorge Sousa (Portugal)
Duarte Gomes (Portugal)
Reserve assistant referee:
Bahattin Duran (Turkey)

Match rules

- 90 minutes
- 30 minutes of extra time if necessary
- Penalty shoot-out if scores still level
- Maximum of three substitutions

=== Statistics ===
First half
Statistic	Spain	Italy
Goals scored	2	0
Total shots	8	8
Shots on target	5	5
Ball possession	48%	52%
Corner kicks	1	3
Fouls committed	6	4
Offsides	1	0
Yellow cards	1	1
Red cards	0	0

Second half
Statistic	Spain	Italy
Goals scored	2	0
Total shots	6	3
Shots on target	4	1
Ball possession	57%	43%
Corner kicks	2	0
Fouls committed	11	6
Offsides	2	3
Yellow cards	0	0
Red cards	0	0

Overall
Statistic	Spain	Italy
Goals scored	4	0
Total shots	14	11
Shots on target	9	6
Ball possession	52%	48%
Corner kicks	3	3
Fouls committed	17	10
Offsides	3	3
Yellow cards	1	1
Red cards	0	0

== Post-match ==
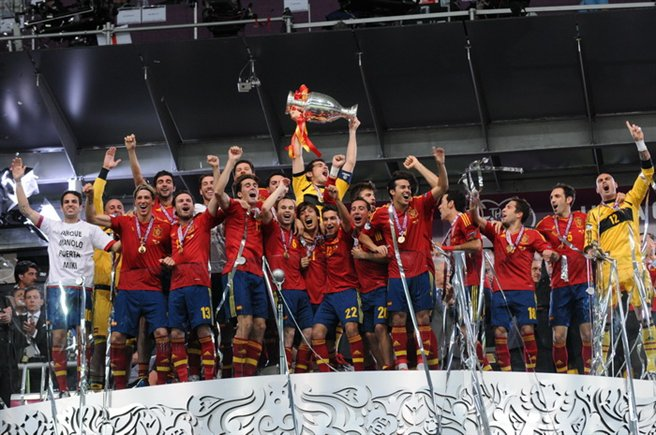
Spain's players celebrating their victory

After the match, the Henri Delaunay Trophy was handed to the Spanish captain Casillas by UEFA president Michel Platini. During the post-match press conference, Spain's manager Del Bosque described his team's triumph as a "great era for Spanish football", but praised opponents Italy's work effort, despite the defeat, stating that they lacked "luck". He added that "the game ended" after the injured midfielder Motta came off with 28 minutes remaining and left Italy with ten players for the remainder of the match. Italy manager Prandelli commented that he would leave Kyiv both proud and disappointed of his side: "When we fly over Kyiv and see the stadium lights I will have pangs of disappointment but I leave proud". He continued by describing that his players lacked "fitness" and were "tired", and added that Italy "were up against a great side, the world champions. and as soon as we went down to ten men it was game over. We had a couple of chances at the start of the second half but didn't take them and when Thiago Motta went off we had nothing left in the tank".

As a result of Spain's win, Del Bosque also became the second manager, after Germany manager Helmut Schön, to lead a national side to a UEFA European Championship and a FIFA World Cup trophy, and the first to have also won the UEFA Champions League.

Spain became the first team to win two consecutive European Championships, and the first team to win three consecutive major tournaments – Euro 2008, the 2010 World Cup and Euro 2012. It was the greatest margin of victory in the history of the European Championship finals, and the fourth time that teams who played each other in the group stage played each other again in the final (1988, 1996 and 2004). Analysts attributed their success in part to a style of play called tiki-taka, which had been introduced by Aragonés and was continued by Del Bosque. This style prioritises short passing, maintaining possession for long periods and patience. The tiki-taka style was also adopted by Pep Guardiola with Spanish club Barcelona, who achieved success in domestic and European competition in the same period. After the 2012 victory, BBC Sport's Phil McNulty wrote that the team were contenders for the greatest national team of all time. Citing their "ultimate combination of silk and steel", with the "Barcelona 'carousel' of Xavi and Andres Iniesta augmented by Real Madrid's Xabi Alonso in midfield", McNulty opined that "it would have to be a very powerful argument against Spain" being the greatest.

Spain's media were highly positive about the result. Marca suggested the Spain team was "the best team of all time", and El País reported that the side played with a "distinguishing style" and that it "no longer arouses skepticism but admiration". Italy's La Gazzetta dello Sport lamented that "the game was already over after the first half" and Corriere dello Sport declared the defeat as "embarrassing". La Repubblica suggested that the Italy team were in poor physical condition. Croatian newspaper 24sata complimented Spain's victory, noting "Tiki-tastic! No one in the history of the Euro has ever achieved such an impressive victory as Spain's against Italy in the Euro 2012 final." Ekstra Bladet, a Danish newspaper, reported that the final provided "excellent entertainment" and that Italy played their part, "by meeting the Spaniards high up the pitch." France's L'Équipe noted that Spain "controlled to perfection" the final and had "made it a question of honour to go down in history in style" while Portugal's A Bola proclaimed the Spain side to be "irresistible" and that their victory was "Historical! Unforgettable!"

Usually, the winner of the European Championship gains entry to the Confederations Cup, which was due to be played in Brazil in 2013. However, since Spain had already qualified as the 2010 World Cup champions, Italy qualified automatically as the UEFA representative, with their win in the semi-final against Germany, despite losing in the final to Spain.

== See also ==
- Italy–Spain football rivalry
- Italy at the UEFA European Championship
- Spain at the UEFA European Championship
