= UEFA Euro 2008 final =

Final game of the UEFA Euro 2008

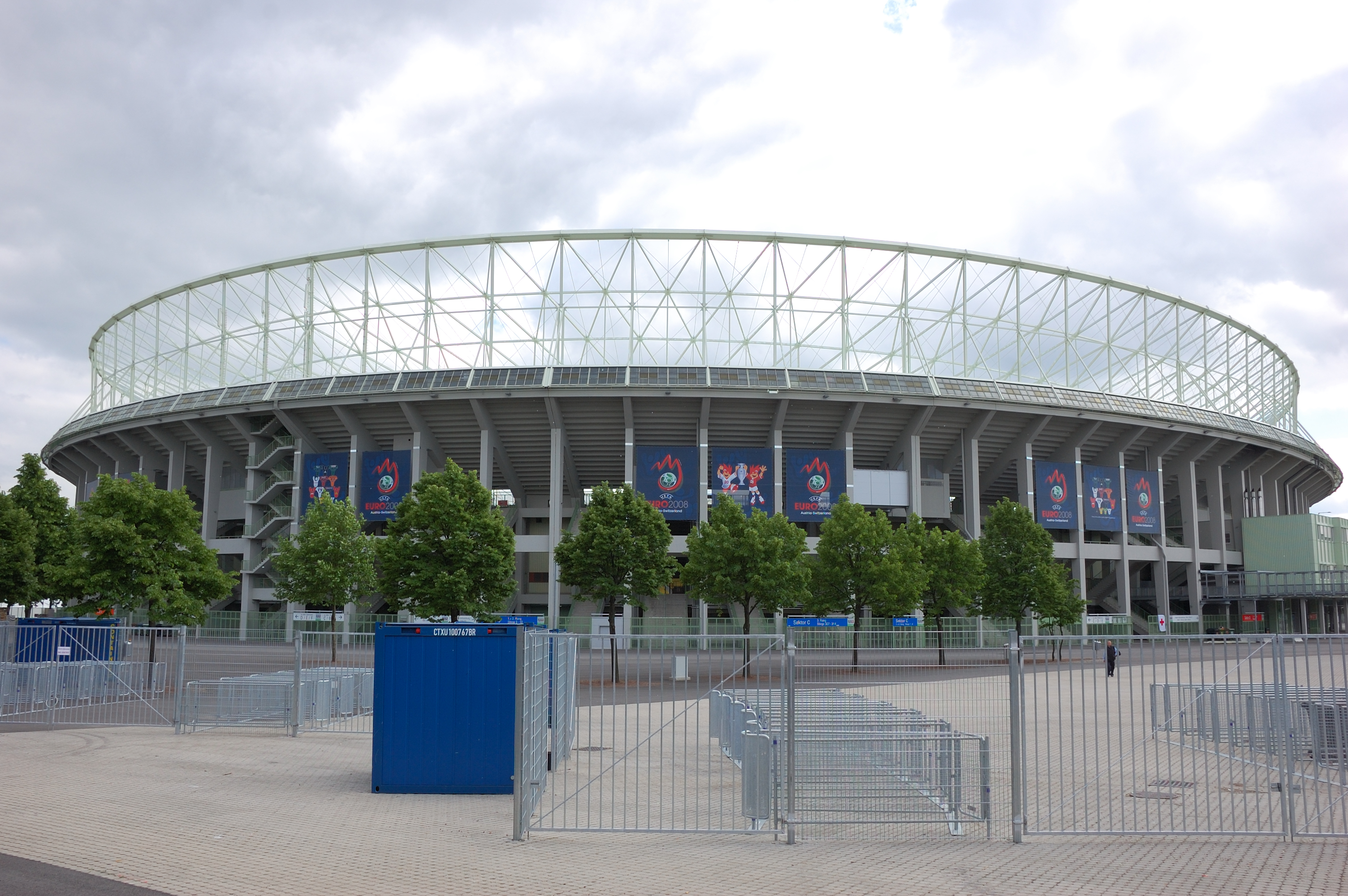
- The Ernst-Happel-Stadion in Vienna hosted the final.
- Event: UEFA Euro 2008
Germany	Spain
0	1
- Date: 29 June 2008
- Venue: Ernst-Happel-Stadion, Vienna
- Man of the Match: Fernando Torres (Spain)
- Referee: Roberto Rosetti (Italy)
- Attendance: 51,428
- Weather: Sunny; 27 °C (81 °F); 44% humidity

The UEFA Euro 2008 final was the final match of UEFA Euro 2008, the thirteenth edition of the European Championship, UEFA's competition for national football teams. The match was played at the Ernst-Happel-Stadion in Vienna, Austria, on 29 June 2008, and was contested between Germany and Spain.

The sixteen-team tournament consisted of a group stage, from which eight teams qualified for the knockout stage. En route to the final, Germany finished second in Group B, with a defeat to Croatia between the wins over Poland and Austria. They then defeated Portugal in the quarter-finals, and Turkey in the semi-finals. Meanwhile, Spain finished top of Group D following three wins coming against Russia, Sweden and Greece. They then defeated Italy on penalties in the quarter-finals, before securing a second victory over Russia in the semi-finals.

The final took place in front of 51,428 supporters, and was refereed by Roberto Rosetti from Italy. Spain scored the match's only goal in the 33rd minute through Fernando Torres, winning 1–0 to secure their second European Championship title and their first since 1964. Goalscorer Torres was named UEFA's man of the match.

Spain's victory marked the start of a period of dominance for the team, which saw them go on to lift the 2010 FIFA World Cup in South Africa, before then retaining their European title at Euro 2012. As winners, Spain also qualified for the 2009 FIFA Confederations Cup in South Africa as UEFA's representative.

== Background ==
UEFA Euro 2008 was the 13th edition of the UEFA European Football Championship, UEFA's football competition for national teams, held between 7 and 29 June 2008 in Austria and Switzerland. Qualifying rounds were held between August 2006 and November 2007, in which fifty teams were divided into seven groups of seven or eight, playing each other on a home-and-away round-robin tournament basis. The top two teams in each group, along with the two host teams, qualified for the sixteen-team finals. There, they were divided into four groups of four with each team playing one another once. The two top teams from each group advanced to a knock-out phase.

Germany had won the title as West Germany in 1972 and in 1980, and again in 1996 as Germany. In the previous international tournament, the 2006 FIFA World Cup, they were knocked out in the semi-final to Italy, before winning the third-place play-off against Portugal. Spain had advanced to the round of 16 in 2006, in which they were defeated by France. Spain had won the European Championship once before, in 1964. The UEFA Euro 2008 Final was the nineteenth meeting between Germany and Spain, eight of the previous matches being won by Germany, five by Spain, and six draws. They had last faced each other in a competitive game in the group stage of the 1994 World Cup, which finished as a 1–1 draw. Greece were the defending champions after winning the 2004 final against Portugal.

The final was held on 29 June 2008 at Ernst-Happel-Stadion in Vienna, the largest stadium of the eight venues used in the finals of Euro 2008. Opened in 1931, the Ernst-Happel-Stadion was built for the second International Workers' Olympiad. Serving as Austria's national stadium, it had previously hosted finals of the UEFA Champions League, including those in 1964, in 1987, in 1990 and in 1995. The capacity of the stadium was increased before the tournament by the addition of temporary stands in front of the permanent stands.

Germany were pre-tournament favourites to win the final, followed by Spain, although the latter's manager Luis Aragonés cautioned that "Nobody should be deceived by Spain because in the major tournaments we haven't done anything."

== Route to the final ==
=== Germany ===
Germany's route to the final
	Opponent	Result
1	Poland	2–0
2	Croatia	1–2
3	Austria	1–0
QF	Portugal	3–2
SF	Turkey	3–2

Germany were drawn in Group B for the tournament, alongside Austria, Croatia and Poland. They faced Poland in their first game in Klagenfurt, Austria, on 8 June 2008. Lukas Podolski gave Germany the lead after 20 minutes when he scored following a pass from Miroslav Klose. Podolski then added a second goal 18 minutes before the end with a volley, to give Germany a 2–0 victory. The win was their first in the tournament since their win over the Czech Republic in the Euro 1996 Final, after they had recorded no wins in 2000 or in 2004. Their second group game took place four days later against Croatia, again in Klagenfurt. Croatia took the lead after 24 minutes through Darijo Srna, before Ivica Olić added a second shortly after the hour mark. Podolski scored for Germany on 78 minutes to make the score 2–1, but they had few chances thereafter and Croatia held on for the win. Bastian Schweinsteiger, a German substitute, was sent off in the 90th minute when he pushed Jerko Leko after the latter had tackled him. Germany concluded their group fixtures against co-hosts Austria in Vienna on 16 June needing a draw to secure their progress to the quarter-finals, while their opponents required a win. The game was settled when Michael Ballack scored from a 30-yard (27 m) free kick in the second half to give Germany a 1–0 win. They qualified as runners-up in the group behind Croatia.

Germany's quarter-final match was against Portugal in the Swiss city of Basel on 19 June. Germany raced into a 2–0 lead in the first half hour of the game with goals from Schweinsteiger and Klose, before Nuno Gomes pulled back a goal for Portugal shortly before half-time. Ballack extended Germany's lead with a header on 62 minutes, and despite Hélder Postiga's late goal for Portugal, Germany held on for a 3–2 win. They returned to Basel again for their semi-final against Turkey, on 25 June. Turkey had several chances in the opening 20 minutes before taking the lead on 22 minutes; Uğur Boral's shot went under the body of goalkeeper Jens Lehmann after Colin Kazim-Richards had hit the crossbar. Five minutes later Schweinsteiger equalised for Germany with a close-range shot. Klose scored Germany's second on 79 minutes, but Turkey equalised 7 minutes later through Semih Şentürk. With the game heading towards extra time, Germany's Philipp Lahm scored a winning goal in the 90th minute. BBC Sport's Phil McNulty described the 3–2 victory as "barely deserved", but Germany were nonetheless through to the final.

=== Spain ===
Spain's route to the final
	Opponent	Result
1	Russia	4–1
2	Sweden	2–1
3	Greece	2–1
QF	Italy	0–0 (a.e.t.) (4–2 p)
SF	Russia	3–0

Spain played in Group D, joined by Greece, Sweden and Russia. Their opening fixture was in Innsbruck, Austria, against Russia on 10 June, in which Spain took the lead through David Villa after 20 minutes. Villa added a second on 45 minutes, following a pass from Andrés Iniesta, to give Spain a 2–0 half-time lead, and he then completed a hat-trick on 75 minutes, the first of the tournament. Roman Pavlyuchenko scored for Russia 4 minutes from full time, before Spain added another goal through substitute Cesc Fàbregas to complete a 4–1 victory. In their next game, also in Innsbruck, Spain faced Sweden. Spain opened the scoring after a quarter of an hour when Fernando Torres notched a goal following David Silva's cross. Zlatan Ibrahimović equalised for Sweden on 34 minutes, but Spain secured the win through a last-minute goal by Villa. This ensured they had qualified for the knock-out rounds with one game to spare. Manager Aragonés therefore decided to rest most of his first-team players for the final game against Greece in Salzburg, Austria, on 18 June. Greece, who were the tournament's defending champions, scored the first goal of the game shortly before half-time through Angelos Charisteas but goals from Rubén de la Red and Dani Güiza on 61 and 88 minutes sealed another Spanish win. They qualified as group winners, with Russia in second place.

Spain's quarter-final match was against Italy in Vienna, on 22 June. The first half of the game was described by McNulty as "a cautious affair, with chances and quality at a premium" and finished goalless. In the second half, Italian substitute Mauro Camoranesi had a chance following a goalmouth scramble which was blocked by Iker Casillas. Marcos Senna then had two chances to give Spain the lead, respectively through a long-range free kick and a shot fumbled onto the post by Gianluigi Buffon. The match remained 0–0 through extra time, and went to a penalty shoot-out. With Spain taking their penalties first, the opening three in the shoot-out were all scored. Casillas then saved Daniele De Rossi's kick to give Spain a 2–1 lead after two penalties each. The next two were scored, but then Buffon saved from Güiza. Antonio Di Natale had a chance to restore parity, but Casillas saved again. Fàbregas then scored to seal a 4–2 shoot-out win. Spain returned to Vienna for their semi-final on 26 June, in which they faced Russia for the second time in the tournament. The first half, played in rainy conditions, ended goalless with Torres being denied by Russia's goalkeeper Igor Akinfeev and Pavlyuchenko shooting wide from a Konstantin Zyryanov cross. Xavi opened the scoring for Spain in the 50th minute after a pass from Iniesta. Torres then missed an opportunity to score after striking a Ramos cross off-target with his knee. In the 73rd minute, Güiza doubled Spain's lead, controlling Fàbregas's pass with his chest before striking the ball over Akinfeev. Silva made it 3–0 in the 82nd minute with a side-footed goal from a Fàbregas cross, concluding a long series of passes by Spain. The win was the largest margin of victory in a semi-final in the history of the European Championship.

== Match ==
=== Pre-match ===
Before the 2008 final, former German international Franz Beckenbauer wrote in the German newspaper Bild that he hoped "for an attractive finale with lots of goals" but said that he expected "a game of patience". Writing in The Observer before the game, journalist Duncan Castles contrasted the styles of play of the two teams, saying that game would hinge on "whether Iberian beauty can conquer German pragmatism". Many Spanish supporters had been pessimistic about the team's chances before the tournament, as a result of their previous lack of success, but according to Steve Kingstone of BBC News, the mood in the country was much more optimistic about their prospects in the final, following the semi-final victory over Russia. The match was watched by tens of thousands of Spaniards in the Plaza de Colón in Madrid. Tristana Moore, reporting for BBC News in Berlin, reported an "air of excitement" before the game, but noted that many Germans had not expected the team to reach the final. A "Fan Mile" was set up at the Brandenburg Gate, where up to 500,000 German supporters were expected to watch the game.

The referee for the game was Roberto Rosetti of Italy. The assistant referees were Alessandro Griselli and Paolo Calcagno, also of Italy, while Sweden's Peter Fröjdfeldt was the fourth official. The tournament's closing ceremony took place before the final, featuring music by Spanish singer Enrique Iglesias, after which the national anthems of the two teams were played.

=== First half ===
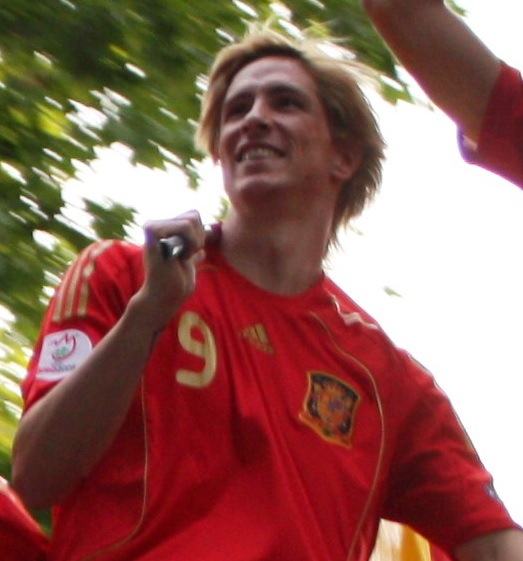
Fernando Torres scored in the first half, the only goal in the game.

Spain kicked off the match at 8:45 pm local time (6:45 pm UTC) in temperatures of 27 °C (81 °F) at the end of a sunny day, with 51,428 spectators in attendance. Spain began by passing around their defence, but then lost the ball when Sergio Ramos mishit a pass which was retrieved by Klose, who ran towards the Spanish goal. Carles Puyol forced Klose out wide to the left, and the ball eventually went behind for a goal kick. Germany then had another attack on 4 minutes when Ballack's pass found Lahm in space on the left-hand side, but his cross did not reach a German attacker. On 7 minutes, Germany attacked on the left for a third time through Ballack, who took the ball past Puyol. His cross looped close to the corner of the Spanish goal, but eventually passed in front of the goal without danger for Spain. The Guardian's Scott Murray commented at the time that Spain had "started very poorly indeed". Chris Waddle, working as an analyst for BBC Radio 5 Live, commented that he had "never seen Spain play so many long balls. I don't know why they're not going through the midfield." Thomas Hitzlsperger had the first shot on target of the game on 9 minutes, but it was too weak to trouble Casillas.

Despite having had no meaningful attacks until that point, Spain almost took the lead on 14 minutes when Xavi found Iniesta inside the German penalty area. Iniesta fired a curling shot intended for the top-right corner of the German goal, which was intercepted by Christoph Metzelder. Metzelder's deflection almost took the ball into the left side of the goal, but Lehmann was able to fingertip the ball behind for a corner. They had another chance on 19 minutes when Torres won a free kick for a foul by Metzelder, but the ball was sent in too high for Torres's header to threaten Germany. Two minutes later, Torres hit the post with a header after Ramos had crossed to him. Germany appealed for a penalty for handball on 25 minutes, when Ramos blocked a Ballack shot, but the referee deemed that it had hit his chest. They claimed another penalty five minutes later, when the ball hit Joan Capdevila's hand after bouncing in the penalty area; this appeal was also denied. Torres then ran into the German penalty area, but Per Mertesacker cleared behind for a corner.

Spain took the lead after 33 minutes when Torres latched onto a through ball from Xavi, beat Lahm on the edge of the penalty area, and then clipped the ball over the advancing Lehmann into the left-hand corner of the goal. BBC Sport's Caroline Cheese credited Torres with "a real striker's instinct" in scoring the goal, with what she had thought had been "a half-chance, if that". They almost doubled their lead two minutes later, when Iniesta crossed the ball to Silva in the German penalty area who had time and space to line up a shot. He instead attempted to take the ball on the volley, and sliced it high and wide. Ballack had to leave the field for few minutes after sustaining a bloody injury to his eye in a collision with Senna, then received a yellow card along with Casillas for an argument following a tussle between Ballack, Iniesta and Puyol. Spain broke up the field once more in a move involving Senna, Silva, Xavi and then Iniesta, but Arne Friedrich blocked the attack and the half ended with Spain leading 1–0.

=== Second half ===
Germany took off Lahm at half time, bringing on Marcell Jansen, who took up the same position that Lahm had played. The opening minutes of the second half panned out as the first half had, Germany having most of the possession but constructing few attacking moves. Xavi had the first shot of the half, which went wide. The referee gave a corner, from which Silva had another shot but it was also wide of the goal. Torres ran at goal a minute later, latching onto another through ball from Xavi, but Lehmann was able to claim the ball. BBC Sport's John Motson commented ten minutes into the half that Spain were "playing in the same controlling way they did in the first half", giving the opinion that Germany would "have to shuffle things around soon". Manager Joachim Löw made a change shortly afterwards, bringing Kevin Kurányi on for Hitzlsperger. Ramos sent a cross into the Germany penalty area on 58 minutes, which went right across the face of the goal, but nobody was able to connect with it. Then, a minute later, Germany almost equalised as Jansen capitalised on a mistake by Puyol to cross for Schweinsteiger. Schweinsteiger passed to Ballack, who volleyed towards goal, but it narrowly missed. Germany continued attacking, first through Ballack, whose cross for Kurányi was intercepted by Casillas, and then through Schweinsteiger, who fired a powerful shot which deflected wide off his team-mate Klose.

Spain took off Fàbregas, described by Murray as having had "a quiet game", on 62 minutes, bringing Xabi Alonso on in his place. Podolski and Silva had a heated argument shortly afterwards, following a tackle by the latter; Ballack also became involved, but the referee did not book any of the players. Silva was taken off by Spanish manager Luis Aragonés shortly afterwards, replaced by Santi Cazorla. A Spanish free kick on 67 minutes was aimed towards Ramos, who headed towards goal, where it was tipped behind by Lehmann. Iniesta's shot from the resulting corner, hit from the edge of the German penalty area, was cleared off the goal-line by Torsten Frings with his knees. Iniesta fired in another shot one minute later, which Lehmann did not catch cleanly, necessitating a clearance by Friedrich. Germany had an attack on 71 minutes through a free kick into the Spanish penalty area, but Casillas was able to punch it to safety.

Torres was booked for a clash of heads with Mertesacker on 73 minutes, after which he had two runs at the German goal. The first went too close to Lehmann, while the second, aimed at Alonso, was intercepted by Jansen. Germany then made another change 12 minutes before the end, in a bid to find an equaliser, Mario Gómez coming on for Klose. Spain also made a substitution, bringing Güiza on for Torres. Immediately after coming on, Güiza chased a long pass forward, which Lehmann came out of his penalty area to intercept. The German goalkeeper took the ball on his chest before kicking it clear, but the Spanish players claimed he had controlled it with his hand. Replays showed that the ball had hit Lehmann's arm in front of his chest, but Murray said that "it would have been a very harsh call" if the referee had penalised him. Güiza was involved in another attack a minute later, taking a pass from Cazorla and heading it on to Senna in front of an open goal. He was narrowly unable to connect with it, though. Both Cheese and Murray likened Senna's miss to a similar missed chance by England's Paul Gascoigne in the semi-final of Euro 1996. Germany had one more chance, with the ball bouncing uncontrolled in the Spanish penalty area, but it ended when the referee penalised them for a foul. The game finished 1–0 to Spain, who thus secured their second European Championship.

=== Details ===
29 June 2008
20:45 CEST

Germany	0–1	Spain
	Report	Torres 33'

Ernst-Happel-Stadion, Vienna
Attendance: 51,428
Referee: Roberto Rosetti (Italy)

Germany	Spain

GK	1	Jens Lehmann
RB	3	Arne Friedrich
CB	17	Per Mertesacker
CB	21	Christoph Metzelder
LB	16	Philipp Lahm		(substituted off) 46'
CM	8	Torsten Frings
CM	15	Thomas Hitzlsperger		(substituted off) 58'
RW	7	Bastian Schweinsteiger
AM	13	Michael Ballack (c)	(yellow card) 43'
LW	20	Lukas Podolski
CF	11	Miroslav Klose		(substituted off) 79'
Substitutions:
DF	2	Marcell Jansen		(substituted in) 46'
FW	22	Kevin Kurányi	(yellow card) 88'	(substituted in) 58'
FW	9	Mario Gómez		(substituted in) 79'
Manager:
Joachim Löw

GK	1	Iker Casillas (c)	(yellow card) 43'
RB	15	Sergio Ramos
CB	4	Carlos Marchena
CB	5	Carles Puyol
LB	11	Joan Capdevila
DM	19	Marcos Senna
RM	6	Andrés Iniesta
CM	8	Xavi
CM	10	Cesc Fàbregas		(substituted off) 63'
LM	21	David Silva		(substituted off) 66'
CF	9	Fernando Torres	(yellow card) 74'	(substituted off) 78'
Substitutions:
MF	14	Xabi Alonso		(substituted in) 63'
MF	12	Santi Cazorla		(substituted in) 66'
FW	17	Dani Güiza		(substituted in) 78'
Manager:
Luis Aragonés

Man of the Match:
Fernando Torres (Spain)

Assistant referees:
Alessandro Griselli (Italy)
Paolo Calcagno (Italy)
Fourth official:
Peter Fröjdfeldt (Sweden)
Reserve assistant referee:
Stefan Wittberg (Sweden)

Match rules

- 90 minutes.
- 30 minutes of extra time if necessary.
- Penalty shoot-out if scores still level.
- Maximum of three substitutions.

=== Statistics ===
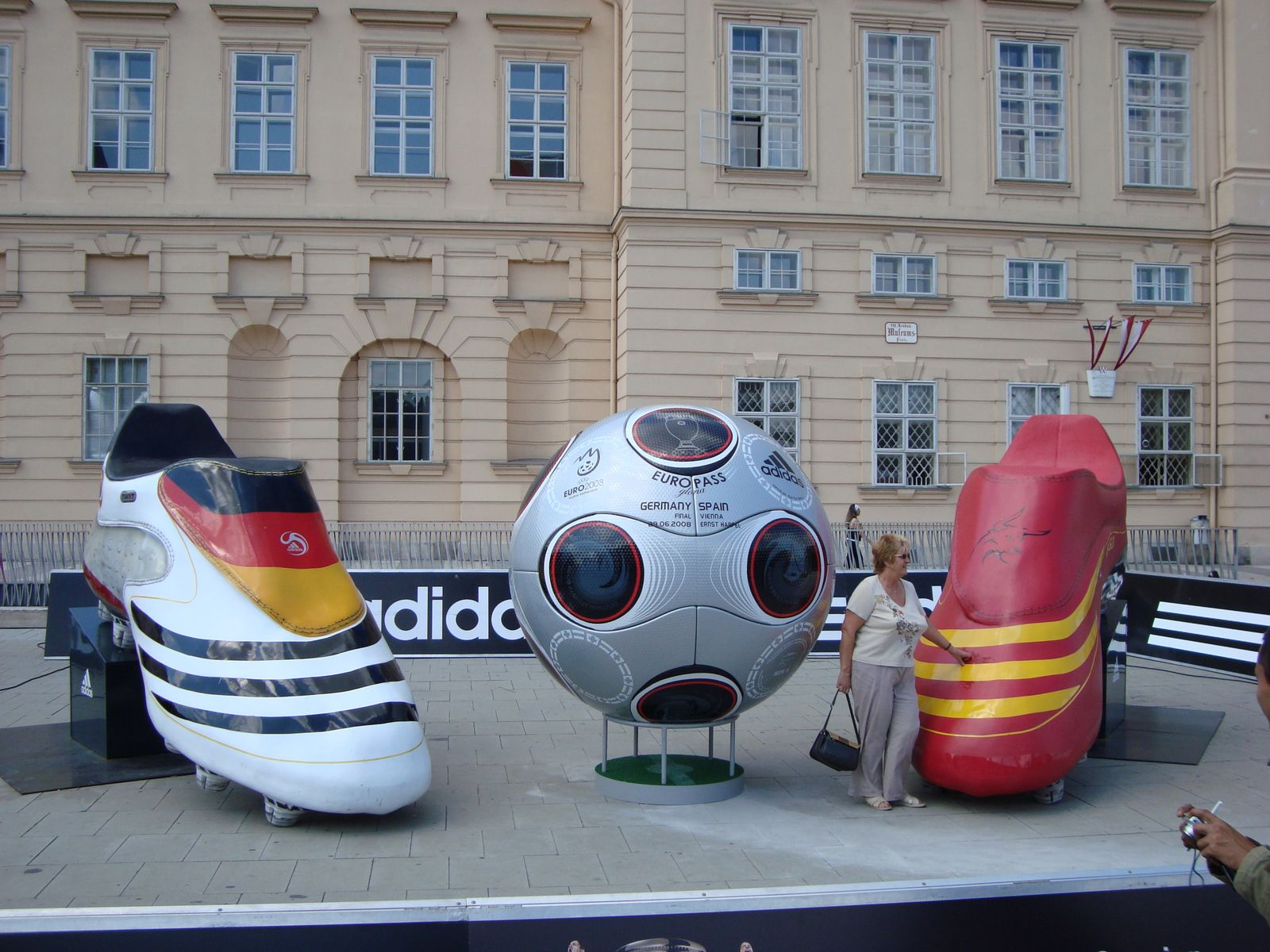
Promotional display for the final in Vienna

Match statistics
	First half		Second half		Overall	
	Germany	Spain	Germany	Spain	Germany	Spain
Goals scored	0	1	0	0	0	1
Total shots	2	6	2	7	4	13
Shots on target	1	3	0	4	1	7
Ball possession	48%	52%	54%	46%	52%	48%
Corner kicks	4	3	0	4	4	7
Fouls committed	10	9	12	10	22	19
Offsides	0	2	5	2	5	4
Yellow cards	1	1	1	1	2	2
Red cards	0	0	0	0	0	0

== Aftermath ==
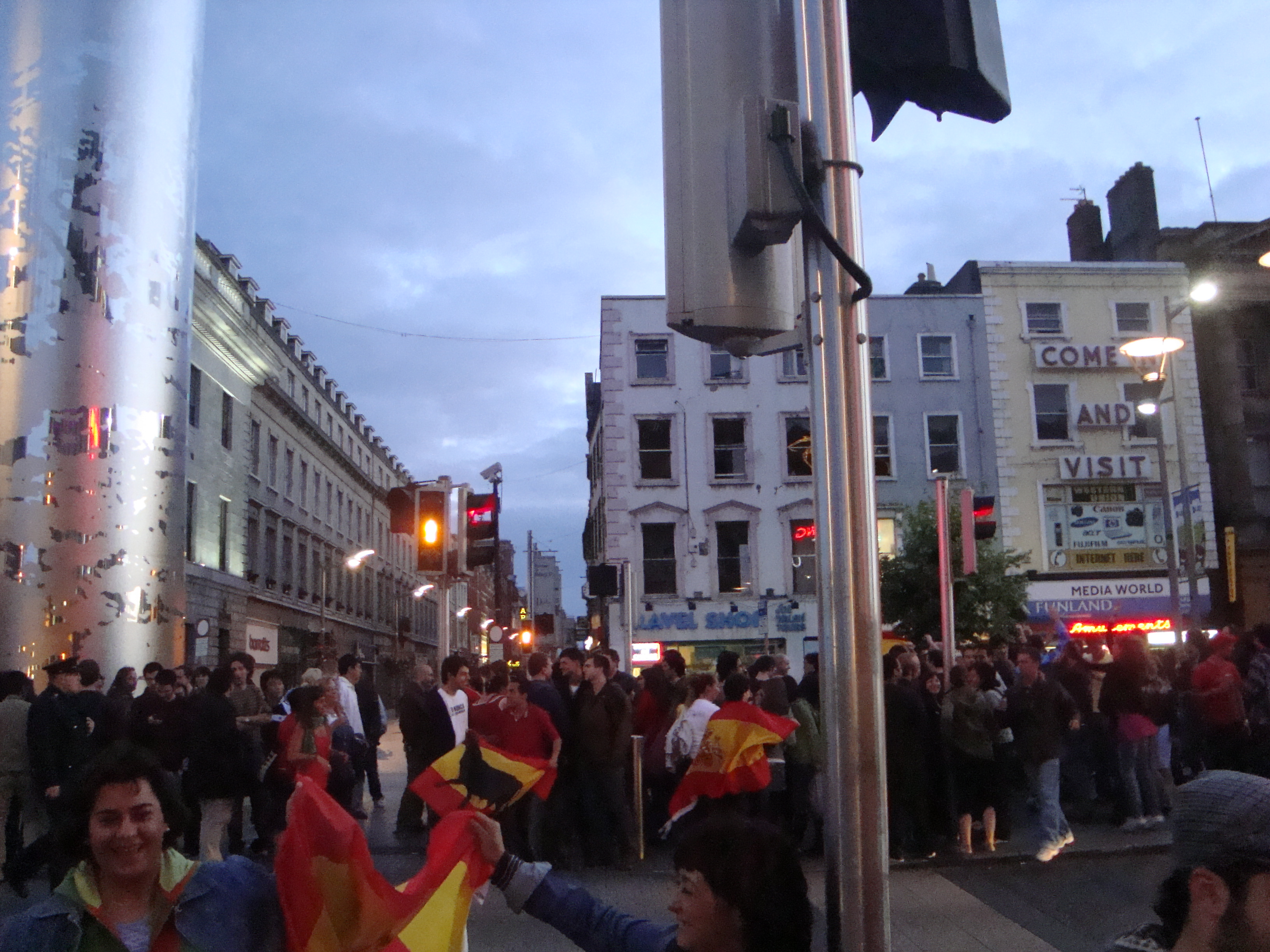
Spanish celebrations in Dublin, a few minutes after the match

After the trophy presentation and during Schweinsteiger's interview, the Spain team performed a conga line back and forward behind him in the mixed zone. Aragonés left his post as Spanish manager after the final, and was succeeded by Vicente del Bosque. He described himself as "full of emotion" after the game, and he praised his players: "We have put together a group that plays well, that keeps the ball and mixes their passes very well and that is difficult to stop. We work hard together, those that play more and those that play slightly less, and we've managed to get there". Löw offered congratulations to Spain, saying that they were "technically excellent" and had deserved to win the match. He expressed satisfaction with Germany's performances and optimism for the future, saying "this defeat is going to be an incentive to work hard over the next two years in a number of areas and to improve". Xavi attributed the win to Aragonés, saying that he "took a gamble on the little guys; putting players like Iniesta, Cazorla, Fàbregas, Silva and Villa in the team. Perhaps that's a word used too often in football but the truth is that the football we played to win in 2008 was beautiful; not just the attacking side of things but how we were set up on the pitch." Torres was named as the man of the match.

Spain's victory marked the start of a period of dominance for the team, and the first of three successive victories in major tournaments, including the 2010 FIFA World Cup in South Africa, and then the retention of their European title at Euro 2012. Analysts attributed their success in part to a style of play called tiki-taka, which had been introduced by Aragonés and was continued by Del Bosque. This style prioritises short passing, maintaining possession for long periods and patience. The tiki-taka style was also adopted by Pep Guardiola with Spanish club Barcelona, who achieved success in domestic and European competition in the same period. After the 2012 victory, McNulty wrote that the team were contenders for the greatest national team of all time. Citing their "ultimate combination of silk and steel", with the "Barcelona 'carousel' of Xavi and Andres Iniesta augmented by Real Madrid's Xabi Alonso in midfield", McNulty opined that "it would have to be a very powerful argument against Spain" being the greatest. Author Jonathan O'Brien opined that the victory marked "Spain's spectacular metamorphosis from underachieving weaklings to the best team in Europe. They exuded flair, pace, a killer instinct – and a rough edge". Germany reached the semi-finals of the 2010 and 2012 tournaments under Löw, before eventually being successful with a win at the 2014 FIFA World Cup in Brazil.

== See also ==
- Germany at the UEFA European Championship
- Spain at the UEFA European Championship
