= UEFA Euro 2020 final =

Final match of the 2020 European Football Championship

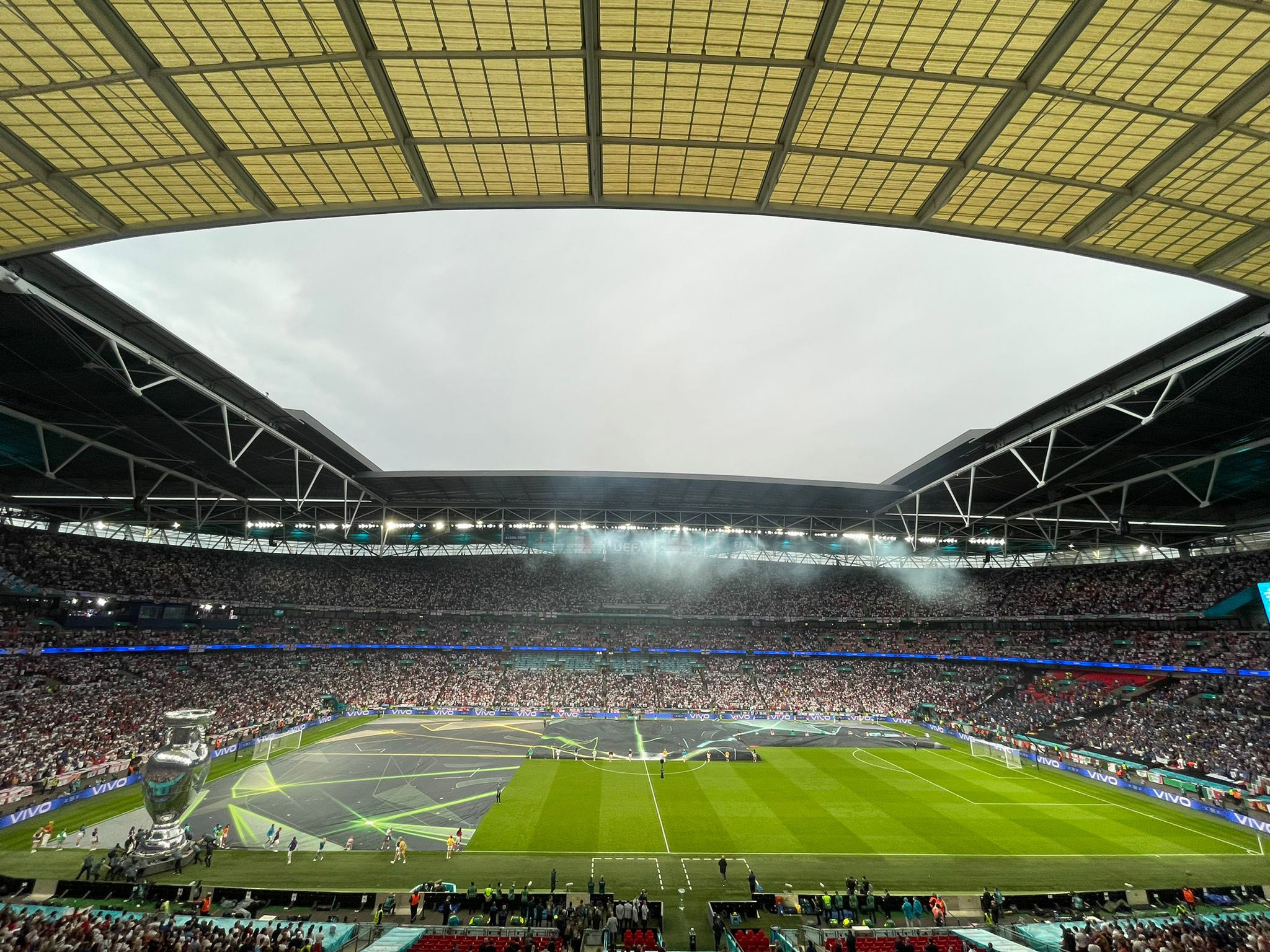
- Wembley Stadium in London, before the final
- Event: UEFA Euro 2020
Italy	England
1	1
- After extra time Italy won 3–2 on penalties
- Date: 11 July 2021
- Venue: Wembley Stadium, London
- Man of the Match: Leonardo Bonucci (Italy)
- Referee: Björn Kuipers (Netherlands)
- Attendance: 67,173
- Weather: Cloudy; 19 °C (66 °F); 68% humidity

The UEFA Euro 2020 final was an association football match that took place at Wembley Stadium in London, England, on 11 July 2021, to determine the winners of UEFA Euro 2020. It was the sixteenth final of the UEFA European Championship, a quadrennial tournament contested by the senior men's national teams of the member associations of UEFA to decide the champions of Europe. Originally scheduled for 12 July 2020, the match had been postponed along with the rest of the tournament due to the COVID-19 pandemic in Europe. The match was contested between Italy, in their fourth Euro final, and England, in their first ever Euro final, and just their second final at any major tournament, after the 1966 FIFA World Cup final.

In front of a crowd of 67,173, limited by COVID-19 restrictions, with an estimated global audience of 328 million, England's Luke Shaw opened the scoring in the second minute of the match, the fastest goal ever scored in a European Championship final. Leonardo Bonucci – who was later named the man of the match – scored an equaliser midway through the second half. With the score 1–1 after extra time, England gained a 2–1 advantage in the penalty shoot-out after two kicks each, but their last three takers all missed, and Italy won 3–2.

This was Italy's first major title since the 2006 FIFA World Cup, and their first European Championship since winning it on home soil in 1968; in terms of European Championship titles, it put Italy level with France on two titles, and one title behind Spain and Germany. England became the third nation in the 21st century to lose the European Championship final on home soil, following Portugal in 2004 and France in 2016. After the match, England's unsuccessful penalty takers (Marcus Rashford, Jadon Sancho and Bukayo Saka) were subjected to racial abuse on social media, which was investigated by the Metropolitan Police. The event was also marred by crowd disorder as roughly six thousand ticketless England supporters fought police and security in attempts to breach the stadium.

== Background ==
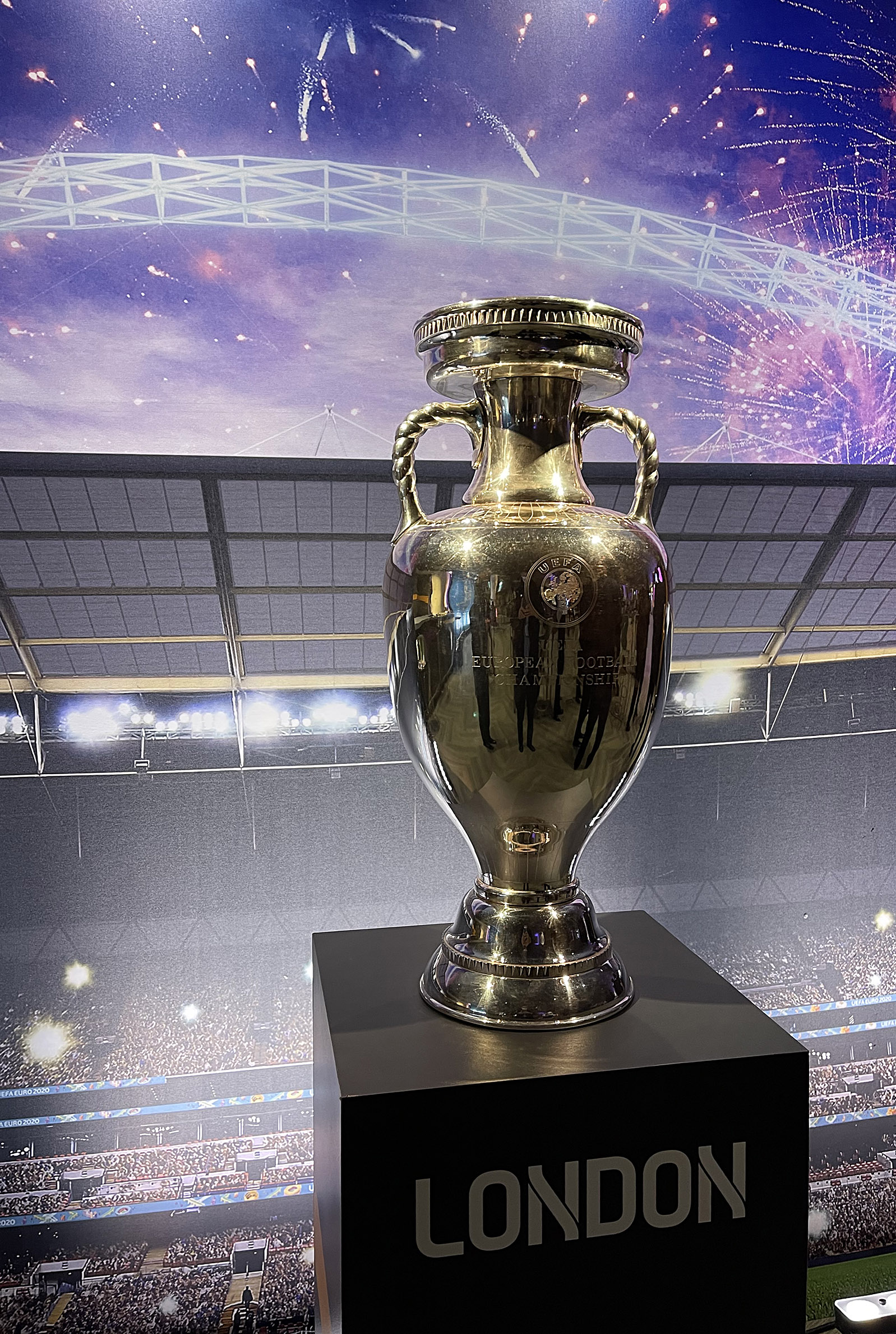
The Henri Delaunay Trophy in Wembley before the final

UEFA Euro 2020 was the sixteenth edition of the European Football Championship, UEFA's football competition for national teams, held between 11 June and 11 July 2021 in eleven cities, all in different countries from each other. Qualifying rounds were held between March and November 2019, in which fifty-five teams were divided into ten groups of five or six, playing each other on a home-and-away round-robin tournament basis. The top two teams in each group qualified for the finals, along with four additional teams, determined by a combination of their 2018–19 UEFA Nations League performance and a series of play-off games. In the finals, the 24 teams were divided into six groups of four with each team playing each other once within the group. The two top teams from each group along with the four best third-placed sides advanced to a knock-out phase.

Due to the COVID-19 pandemic in Europe during 2020, the tournament was postponed to summer 2021, while retaining the name Euro 2020 and using the same host venues. Alongside special rules regarding COVID-19, UEFA also allowed more substitutions than had originally been planned and implemented video assistant referee (VAR) for the first time.

Before the tournament, England were considered by bookmakers to be second favourites to win it, behind France; Italy were seventh favourites and were described by Evan Bartlett of the i newspaper as "potential dark horses". The two sides were ranked fourth and seventh, respectively, in the FIFA World Rankings released before the start of the tournament. Both are former FIFA World Cup champions, Italy winning four times, most recently in 2006, and England winning once, in 1966. However, Italy had failed to qualify for the 2018 FIFA World Cup, the first time they had missed the tournament since 1958. England, meanwhile, finished fourth at the tournament, equaling their best finish since 1966, achieved in 1990. Italy won the European Championship in 1968 as the hosts; England's best performance in the competition was to reach the semi-finals twice, in 1968 and 1996. In the previous European Championship, Italy were eliminated in the quarter-finals on penalties to Germany, while England went out in the round of 16 after a shock defeat to newcomers Iceland.

Italy had previously played in three European Championship finals; they beat Yugoslavia in 1968 after a replay, lost to France in 2000 via a golden goal and lost to Spain in 2012. They entered the final on a 33-match unbeaten run, the third-longest in international football history behind the 35-match streaks of Brazil (1993–1996) and Spain (2007–2009), having last lost 1–0 to Portugal in the 2018–19 UEFA Nations League on 10 September 2018. Italy were also on a 27-match unbeaten run in competitive fixtures, only behind the 29-match streak of Spain from 2010 to 2013.

The final was England's first at a major tournament since the 1966 World Cup, the only other final they had reached. England also became the third nation of the 21st century to play in a European Championship final as hosts after Portugal in 2004 and France in 2016. Both previous hosts lost their respective finals, Portugal against Greece and France against Portugal. In the 20th century, three host countries made it to the final and all won – Italy in 1968, Spain in 1964 and France in 1984. Despite the final taking place in London, Italy were the "home team" for administrative purposes.

England and Italy had previously met 27 times, their first encounter taking place in 1933, a 1–1 draw in Rome. Before the final, Italy had won ten of these meetings, England eight and nine were draws. Their most recent meeting was a 2018 friendly in London, also a 1–1 draw. Italy won three of their four competitive meetings at major tournaments: in the group stage of UEFA Euro 1980, the third place play-off of the 1990 FIFA World Cup and the group stage of the 2014 FIFA World Cup; the fourth, in the quarter-finals of UEFA Euro 2012, finished as a draw, but Italy won the subsequent penalty shoot-out. England were considered as slight pre-match favourites by bookmakers.

== Venue ==
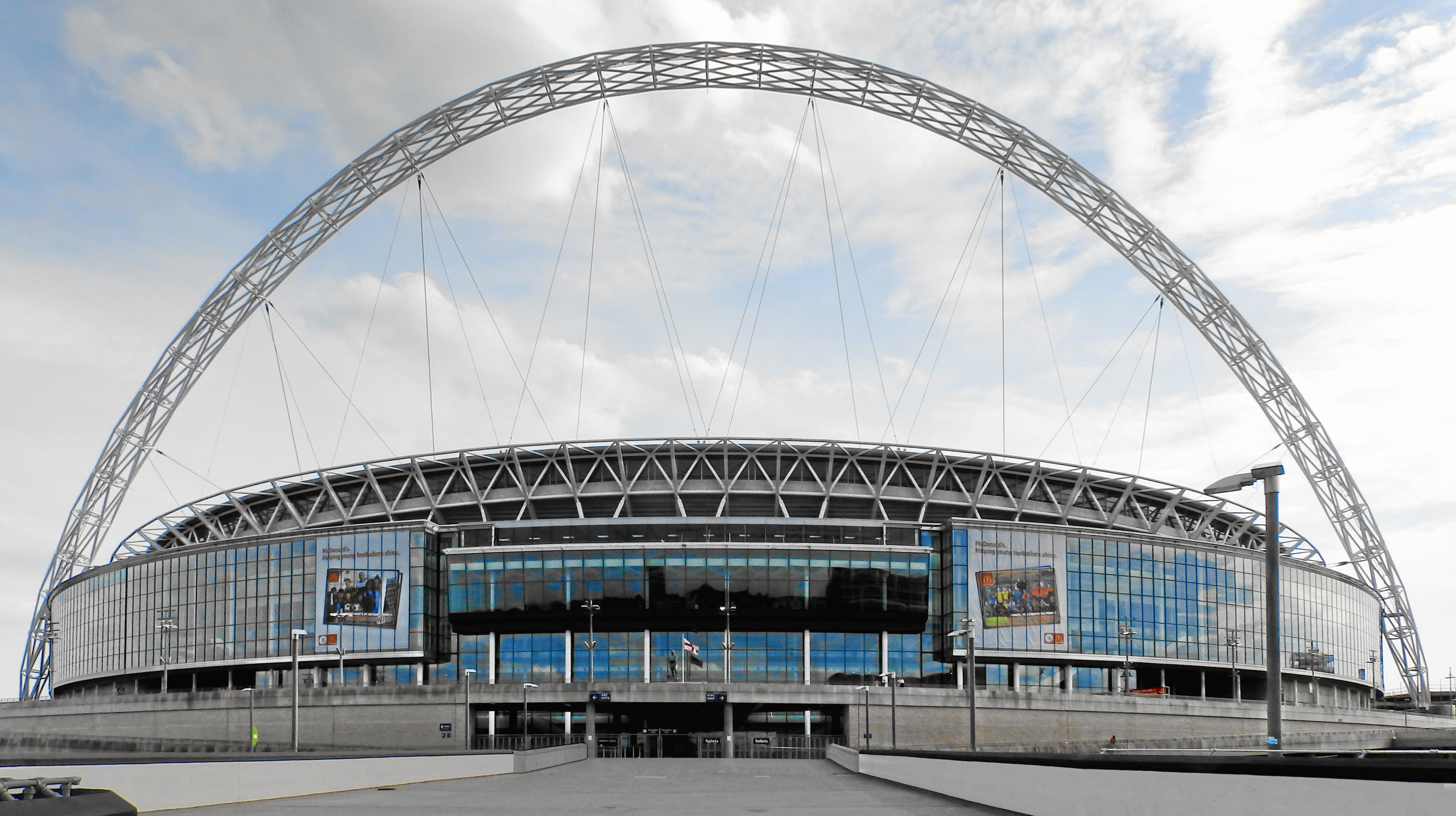
Wembley Stadium in London, the venue of the final

The final was played at Wembley Stadium in London. On 6 December 2012, UEFA announced that the tournament would be held in multiple cities across Europe to mark the 60th anniversary of the UEFA European Championship, with no host teams qualifying automatically. Wembley was chosen as the venue for the semi-finals and final by the UEFA Executive Committee on 19 September 2014, having been selected by acclamation after the finals package bid of the Allianz Arena in Munich was withdrawn. After winning the hosting rights, London's standard package bid for group stage matches and an earlier knockout match was withdrawn. The UEFA Executive Committee removed Brussels as a host city on 7 December 2017 due to delays with the building of the Eurostadium. The four matches (three group stage, one round of 16) initially scheduled to be held in Brussels were reallocated to London, leaving Wembley with seven tournament matches. This was later increased to eight matches, as Dublin was removed as a host city on 23 April 2021, as the city could not ensure spectators would be able to attend due to the COVID-19 pandemic, and its round of 16 fixture was reallocated to Wembley.

Wembley Stadium opened in 2007 on the site of the original stadium, the demolition of which took place between 2002 and 2003. Owned by the Football Association (FA), it serves as England's national football stadium. The original stadium, formerly known as the Empire Stadium, opened in 1923 and hosted matches at the 1966 FIFA World Cup, including the final, which saw hosts England beat West Germany 4–2 after extra time, and at UEFA Euro 1996, including the final, in which Germany defeated the Czech Republic. Wembley also hosts the annual FA Cup Final. Wembley's hosting of both the semi-finals and the final remained subject to UEFA and the Government of the United Kingdom reaching an agreement over quarantine rules for fans and VIPs. The Puskás Aréna in Budapest was seen as the prime candidate to replace Wembley, should it not be able to host the final. Despite this, UEFA remained confident that Wembley could host the final. On 22 June, the British government altered the COVID-19 pandemic regulations in London to allow 75% of the stadium's capacity to be used, meaning that 60,000 spectators were expected to be present at the final as long as they could show proof of having been tested or fully vaccinated. Special permission was also granted for up to 1,000 fans to fly in from Italy to watch the game. Special conditions applied to the supporters from Italy, including being tested for COVID-19 before arrival, not being in the country for more than 12 hours, using dedicated transport and being in segregated seating at Wembley.

== Route to the final ==
=== Italy ===
Italy's route to the final
	Opponent	Result
1	Turkey	3–0
2	Switzerland	3–0
3	Wales	1–0
R16	Austria	2–1 (a.e.t.)
QF	Belgium	2–1
SF	Spain	1–1 (a.e.t.; 4–2 p)

Italy qualified for the tournament as qualifying Group J winners, having won all ten of their games, and were drawn in Group A along with Switzerland, Turkey and Wales; being one of the host nations, Italy played all three group games at home at Rome's Stadio Olimpico. Italy opened the tournament with a 3–0 win over Turkey, Turkish defender Merih Demiral scoring an own goal to give the Italians the lead in the 53rd minute, before Ciro Immobile and Lorenzo Insigne scored two further goals. Italy then beat Switzerland with another 3–0 win, Manuel Locatelli scoring twice and Immobile scoring the last goal to seal a place into the round of 16 with a game to spare, despite captain Giorgio Chiellini suffering an injury. In their third group game, Italy beat Wales 1–0 with Matteo Pessina scoring the only goal in the first half to ensure the side finished with a perfect record in the group stage. The result meant Italy were the first team in European Championship history to win each group stage match without conceding.

In the round of 16 played at Wembley Stadium, Italy struggled against Austria, who had finished second in Group C. Austria's Marko Arnautović had a goal ruled out for offside in the 67th minute, and it was only in the first period of extra time that Italian substitutes Federico Chiesa and Pessina each scored a goal to give Italy a 2–0 lead. Despite Saša Kalajdžić, an Austrian substitute, salvaging a goal for his team in the second half of extra time (the first goal conceded by the Italians at the tournament), Italy held on to reach the quarter-finals.

Italy's quarter-final match was against the top-ranked team in the FIFA World Rankings, Belgium, and was played at Munich's Allianz Arena. Nicolò Barella beat Thibaut Courtois to score in the 31st minute, before Insigne doubled their lead in the 44th minute with a powerful strike; Belgium's Romelu Lukaku then converted a successful penalty during injury time of the first half. Despite an Achilles tendon injury in the second half to Leonardo Spinazzola that ruled him out for the rest of the tournament, Italy once again held the scoreline to eliminate the Belgians. The victory set a new record for the longest European Championship winning streak at 15, including both qualifying and the final tournament.

Italy returned to Wembley to face Spain in the semi-finals, the fourth consecutive European Championship in which the two sides met. In a tight game dominated by possession football, Italy got the breakthrough from Chiesa after 60 minutes; 20 minutes later Álvaro Morata equalised for Spain to make the score 1–1. No further goals were scored in extra time, resulting in a penalty shoot-out; both Locatelli and Dani Olmo failed to score the first penalties for their respective sides, before Gianluigi Donnarumma saved Spain's fourth kick from Morata. Jorginho then scored the subsequent penalty to take Italy to their first European final since 2012.

=== England ===
England's route to the final
	Opponent	Result
1	Croatia	1–0
2	Scotland	0–0
3	Czech Republic	1–0
R16	Germany	2–0
QF	Ukraine	4–0
SF	Denmark	2–1 (a.e.t.)

England qualified by topping qualifying Group A, winning seven and losing just one of their eight qualification matches. They were drawn into Group D and also played their three group matches at their home stadium, Wembley. They were joined in the group by co-hosts and rivals Scotland, the Czech Republic and 2018 FIFA World Cup runners-up Croatia, who had beaten England in the 2018 semi-finals. England started with a 1–0 win over Croatia, Raheem Sterling being the difference with his goal in the 57th minute giving England their first three points; it was the first time that England had won the opening game of the group stage at a European Championship. In their second match, England held Scotland to a goalless draw despite plenty of opportunities from the Scots to finish the game; even with the draw, England were still guaranteed a place in the last 16 before their final group match due to other group results. England then confirmed top spot in the group by beating the Czech Republic 1–0, with a goal from Sterling early in the game. In doing so, England became the first team in European Championship history to win their group after scoring only two goals. Acquiring seven points in the process, England knew they would remain at Wembley for the round of 16 but would face the runners-up from Group F.

England faced rivals Germany at Wembley in the round-of-16 where Sterling once again broke the deadlock, after 75 minutes. Germany's Thomas Müller then ran through on goal but shot inches wide, before Harry Kane became the second player to score for England in the tournament to seal a 2–0 win, the first for the team against a Germany national side in the knockout stages of an international tournament since the 1966 World Cup Final.

England's quarter-final, played at Rome's Stadio Olimpico (their only match outside of Wembley in the entire tournament), saw the side outplay Ukraine in a 4–0 win, Kane scoring twice, and Harry Maguire and Jordan Henderson (with his first international goal) scoring the others to give England their biggest ever victory at the European Championship finals.

In the semi-finals, England hosted Denmark at Wembley and conceded their first goal of the tournament on the half-hour mark, when Mikkel Damsgaard scored with a free kick that goalkeeper Jordan Pickford failed to keep out. Efforts to equalise by England eventually paid off less than 10 minutes later with an own goal by Simon Kjær, but both sides failed to score another goal in normal time. In the first period of extra time, a penalty for a foul on Sterling was given to England. Kane took the spot kick, scoring his fourth goal of the tournament from the rebound after his initial effort was saved by Kasper Schmeichel, to put England in a 2–1 lead. His side held on for the remainder of extra time to qualify for the final. Queen Elizabeth II, UK prime minister Boris Johnson and FA president Prince William, Duke of Cambridge, congratulated the England team on their run in the tournament, wishing them good luck in the final.

== Pre-match ==
=== Officials ===
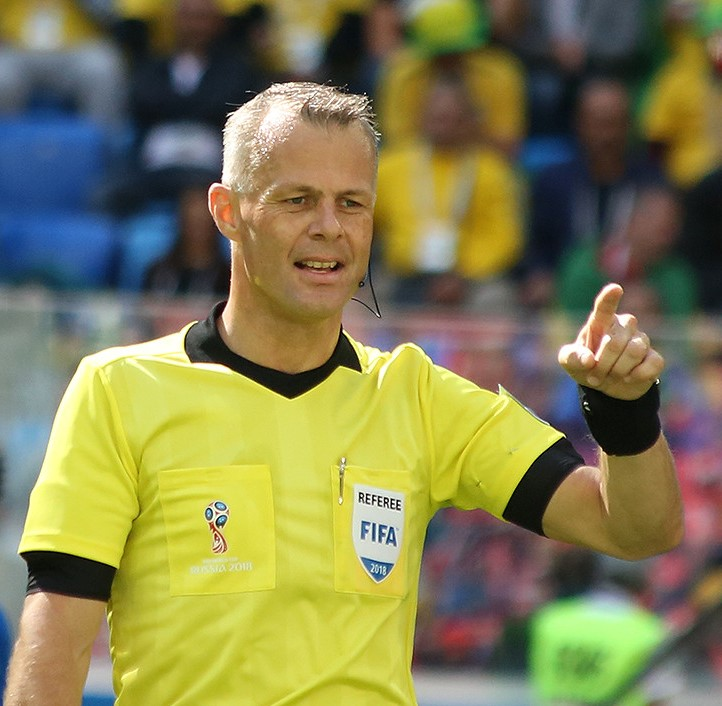
Dutchman Björn Kuipers (pictured in 2018) was selected as the referee for the final.

On 8 July 2021, the UEFA Referees Committee announced the officiating team for the final, led by 48-year-old Dutch referee Björn Kuipers of the Royal Dutch Football Association. He was joined by three of his compatriots, Sander van Roekel and Erwin Zeinstra as assistant referees, and Pol van Boekel as one of the assistant VAR officials. Carlos del Cerro Grande of Spain was chosen as the fourth official, and his fellow countryman Juan Carlos Yuste Jiménez was the reserve assistant referee. Bastian Dankert of Germany was selected as the VAR for the match, the first use of the technology in the final of the European Championship, and was joined by fellow countrymen Christian Gittelmann and Marco Fritz as the remaining assistant VAR officials.

Kuipers had been a FIFA referee since 2006 and was the first Dutch referee to officiate a European Championship final. UEFA Euro 2020 was his fifth major international tournament, after the European Championship in 2012 and 2016, and the FIFA World Cup in 2014 and 2018. He officiated three matches earlier in the tournament: Denmark vs Belgium and Slovakia vs Spain in the group stage, and the quarter-final between the Czech Republic and Denmark. The 2020 final was Kuipers's ninth international final; he had officiated those of several UEFA youth competitions, the 2013 FIFA Confederations Cup, the 2013–14 UEFA Champions League, the 2017 FIFA U-20 World Cup and the 2017–18 UEFA Europa League. The final was the fourth time Kuipers had refereed Italy and the third for England, which includes the group stage meeting between the two sides at the 2014 World Cup, which Italy won 2–1.

=== Team selection ===
Italy had nearly all of their squad available with the exception of defender Spinazzola, following his injury in the quarter-final. Right-back Alessandro Florenzi, who had suffered a calf injury in Italy's opening match of the tournament, recovered before the final but lost his starting spot to Giovanni Di Lorenzo. For England, midfielder Phil Foden was ruled out of the game due to a foot injury sustained during training.

Italy remained unchanged from their semi-final victory against Spain, manager Roberto Mancini opting for a 4–3–3 formation. England manager Gareth Southgate made one change from their semi-final win over Denmark, Kieran Trippier replacing Bukayo Saka. Southgate also made a tactical switch, replacing the 4–2–3–1 formation that he had primarily used during the tournament with a 3–4–3 formation similar to their round of 16 match against Germany, with Trippier and Luke Shaw as wing-backs.

=== Crowd disorder ===
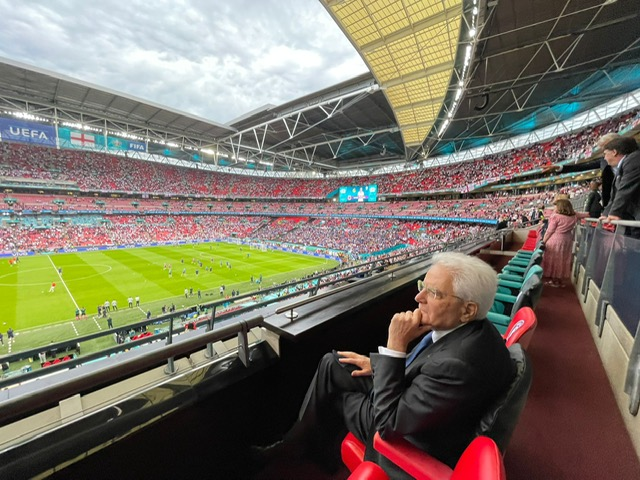
President of Italy Sergio Mattarella attending the final

Thousands of England fans gathered at Wembley Stadium throughout the morning and afternoon, which prompted the police to urge anyone without tickets not to travel there. Footage from two hours before the final showed a few ticketless fans fighting with stewards and police as they attempted to force their way past barriers to get into the stadium. Groups of people managed to gain access to the stadium without tickets, eyewitness reports saying the number of illegal entries might be in the hundreds. Large crowds also gathered in Leicester Square in Central London, throwing bottles and other objects, and Trafalgar Square, where a ticketed fan zone was set up. As a result of the violence and disorder, 86 people were arrested by police, 53 of them at Wembley Stadium for offences including public order breaches, assault, drunk and disorderly conduct, and criminal damage. Nineteen police officers were injured, including one who lost a tooth and another who suffered a broken hand. The father of England's Harry Maguire was also caught up in the disturbances at the stadium, suffering injuries to his ribs.

On 12 July 2021, a day after the final, The Football Association said it would conduct a full review into how people without tickets were able to breach security and gain access to the stadium. Four days later, two men were arrested on suspicion of stealing items that helped ticketless fans storm the stadium ahead of the final. In August 2021, Baroness Casey was appointed to review the incident. Her report, published in December, found that there had been a "collective failure" in preparing for the match and noted 17 mass breaches of entry to the stadium.

In 2024, Netflix released the documentary film The Final: Attack on Wembley, chronicling the violence and destruction caused by the ticketless hooligans.

=== Closing ceremony and anthems ===
Before the match started, a closing ceremony was organised by UEFA, which started at 19:45 local time (18:45 UTC). An inflatable replica of the Henri Delaunay Trophy was brought onto the field as a light show and pyrotechnics got underway. Soldiers in bearskin hats played trumpets and the Red Arrows performed a flypast above Wembley Stadium in support of the England team, before performers danced to music by Dutch DJ Martin Garrix.

The national anthems of each country were played before kick-off; some England fans in the crowd booed during the Italian national anthem despite pleas from England manager Southgate and other former players not to do so. The match ball was brought to the centre of the pitch on a remote-controlled car replica of a Volkswagen ID.4, as was the case throughout the tournament, in rainbow colours, symbolising the support of LGBT rights. Both sides took the knee for racial equality before the starting whistle, as the England team had done before all their games in the tournament.

=== Notable spectators ===
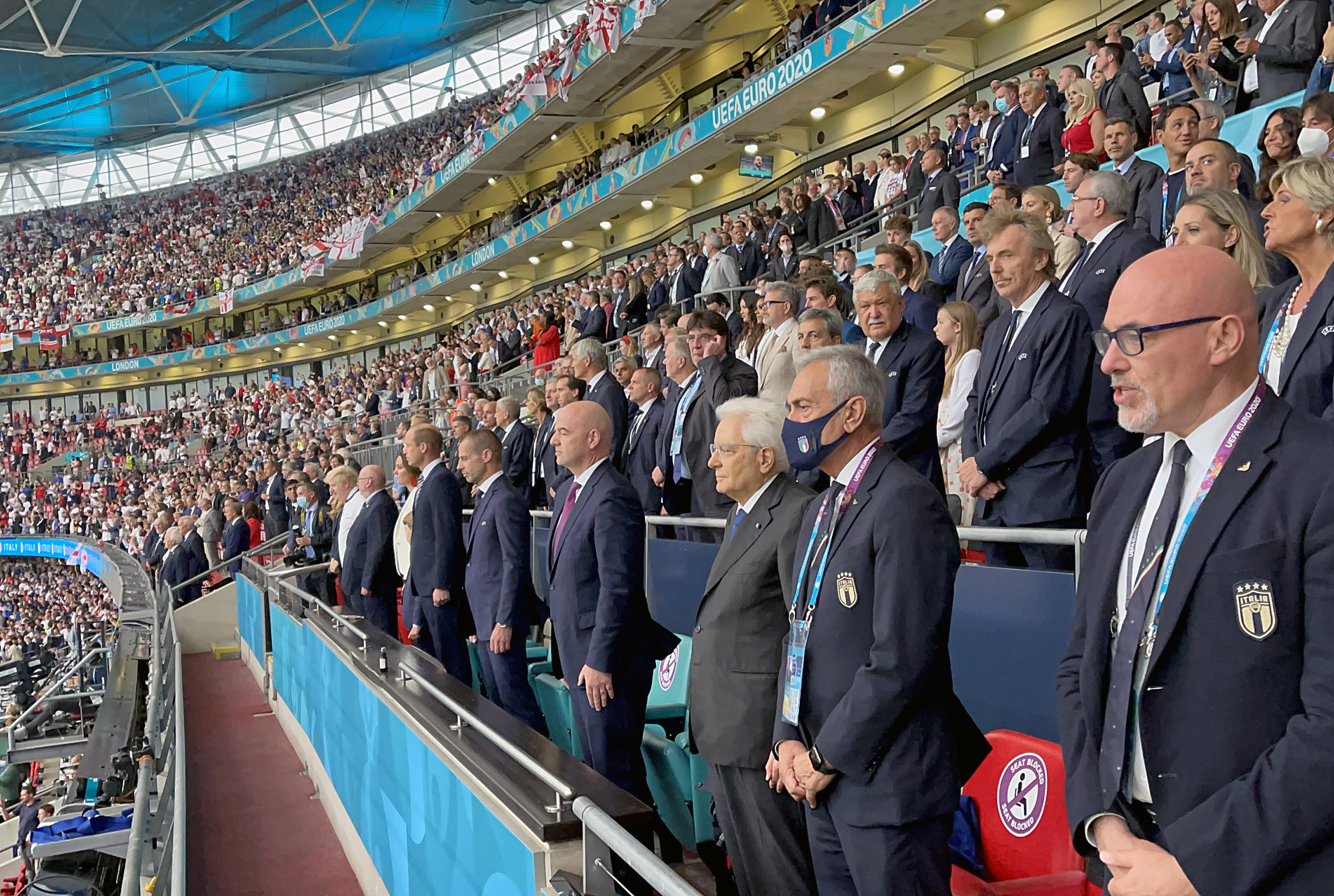
Distinguished visitors in the Wembley official gallery

The final was attended by politicians and royalty, including President of Italy Sergio Mattarella, UK Prime Minister Boris Johnson, Zara Tindall and Mike Tindall, Prince William, Duke of Cambridge, Catherine, Duchess of Cambridge, and Prince George of Cambridge. There were also guests from the entertainment industry such as Tom Cruise and Kate Moss, as well as former football players and managers like David Beckham, Geoff Hurst and Fabio Capello.

== Match ==
=== Summary ===
==== First half ====
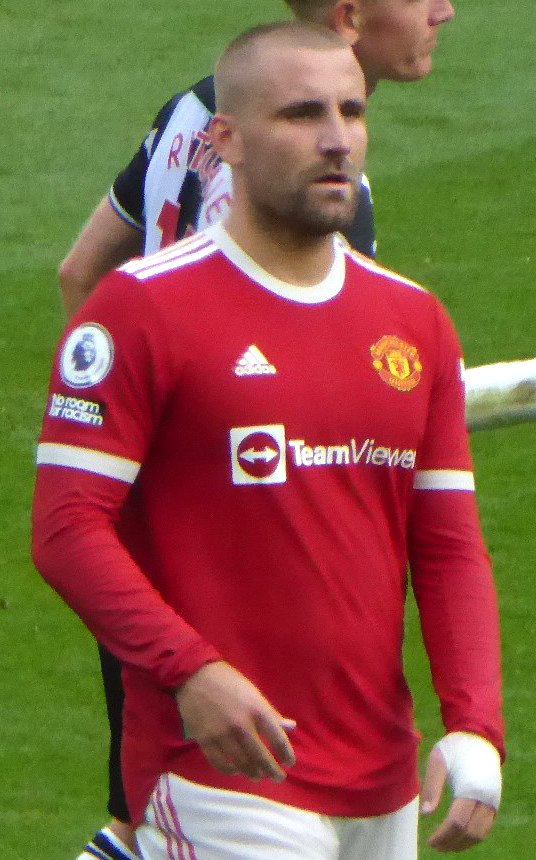
Luke Shaw (pictured in 2021) scored for England in the second minute, the fastest goal ever scored in a Euro final.

The match kicked off at 20:00 local time, in cloudy and rainy conditions, in front of 67,173 spectators, with Italy playing in blue shirts, dark blue shorts and blue socks, and England playing in white shirts, white shorts and white socks. England's Maguire conceded a corner in the opening minute with a failed pass attempt back to goalkeeper Pickford, but Maguire himself was able to clear the danger. England then launched an attack of their own, when Kane passed the ball to Trippier, who ran down the right-hand side of the field. Trippier crossed the ball to the far side of the penalty area to Shaw, who scored his first goal for England with a low shot on the half-volley just inside the left post. Timed at 1 minute and 56 seconds, this was the earliest goal ever in a European Championship final. In the 8th minute, Italy won a free kick just outside the penalty area, which was taken by Insigne; he shot, but it went over the crossbar. The match had opened at a fast pace, and England's Kyle Walker launched another attack in the 10th minute, when he passed to Trippier who had space to run forward. Trippier sent in a cross intended for Sterling, but it was intercepted and cleared by Italy's Chiellini. England continued attacking, first through Trippier, who was given space to run down the right again and won a corner, which was caught by the Italian goalkeeper Donnarumma. In the 15th minute, Mason Mount won another corner when his run down the left forced Italy's Jorginho to clear the ball behind.

Italy began to dominate possession from the 15-minute mark, The Guardian's Scott Murray commenting at the time that there were "signs that [Italy] are stirring after their nightmare start". In the 20th minute, they had a chance to break upfield through Marco Verratti and Insigne after Kane had lost the ball, but a foul by Chiellini on Kane ended the move. Jorginho then sustained an injury and had to leave the field for five minutes, but was eventually able to continue. In the 24th minute, Chiesa found himself in some space on the right-hand side, sending a cross into the penalty area, but it was defended by England. An Italian attack in the 28th minute ended when Insigne shot wide. He then had another chance to run into the England penalty area in the 32nd minute, after the team had advanced forward by passing the ball around on the left, but the England defence cleared once more.

For some time, England were unable to retain the ball whenever they won it back, but in the 34th minute they had a good chance to double their lead when Kane passed a ball towards Sterling, who was in an attacking position. Sterling passed to Mount, who attempted to pass back to Sterling, but Italy were able to intercept and prevent a likely goal. Italy then had a chance of their own a minute later, when Chiesa beat England's Shaw and Declan Rice before running at the goal and shooting from 25 yards (23 m) out. His shot had Pickford beaten, but it went slightly to the side of the goalpost. Shortly before half-time, Italy had what Murray described as their "best move of the match", Di Lorenzo crossing to Immobile, 12 yards (11 m) from goal, but John Stones blocked his shot and then Verratti's follow-up was claimed by Pickford. Italy had one more chance, Leonardo Bonucci having a long-range shot, but it was high and wide. The referee then blew the half-time whistle, with the score at 1–0 to England. Italy had dominated possession in the first half, but England's defence had limited their attack to just one shot on target.

==== Second half ====
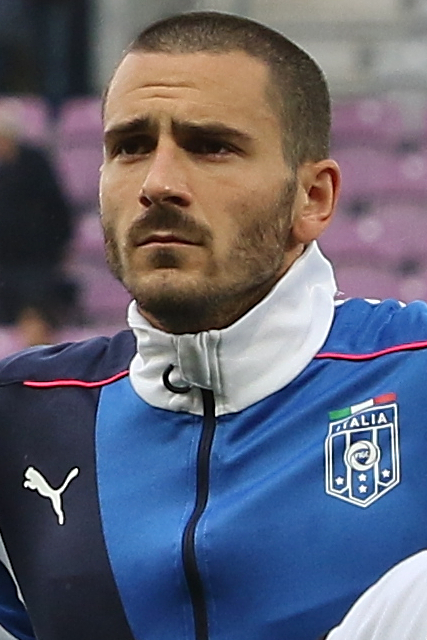
Italy's Leonardo Bonucci (pictured in 2015) scored in the 67th minute, tying the match and making him the oldest person to score a goal in a Euro final.

England kicked off the second half. Italy's Barella received the first yellow card of the match in the 47th minute for a foul on Kane. Sterling then ran with the ball into the Italian penalty area, taking it between Bonucci and Chiellini before falling to the ground. Sterling wanted a penalty, but the referee decided on no foul. Italy won a free kick on the edge of the England penalty area in the 50th minute, when Sterling fouled Insigne; the Italian took the kick himself, but it went high and wide once again. Two minutes later, Chiesa ran down the right-hand side before sending a long cross towards Insigne. Walker intercepted, heading back to Pickford, then Insigne had another run into the England penalty area from the left, before hitting a shot wide of the goal. Italy made the first substitutions of the game in the 54th minute, bringing on Bryan Cristante and Domenico Berardi for Immobile and Barella.

In the 55th minute, Bonucci fouled Sterling from behind and was booked by the referee. England's free kick reached Maguire 8 yards (7 m) from goal, but his header went over the crossbar. Italy then attacked at the other end; a long-range shot from Chiesa was deflected into the path of Insigne, who fired a powerful shot at goal, but Pickford saved it. As they had in the first half, Italy began to dominate possession. Just after the hour mark, Chiesa dribbled the ball across the edge of the England penalty area, before getting space to fire a shot at goal, which was once again saved by Pickford. England managed to retain the ball for a few minutes after this, Shaw launching an attack up the left that ended when his pass failed to reach Mount. Italy were on the attack again in the 66th minute, when Chiesa sent a curling cross in from the left. Insigne had the chance to score from 6 yards (5 m) but was not able to jump high enough to head the ball. A minute later, Italy won a corner, which was flicked on by Cristante to Verratti, who headed the ball towards goal; it was turned onto the post by Pickford, but Bonucci was able to react quickest and hit the ball into the goal from close range for Italy's equaliser. At the age of 34 years and 71 days, Bonucci became the oldest scorer in the final of a European Championship.

With the score tied at 1–1, England manager Southgate made a tactical substitution, bringing on the attacking player Bukayo Saka in place of Trippier, and switched to a 4–3–3 formation. After another Italian attack in the 73rd minute, which ended when Berardi failed to control the ball in the England penalty area having run behind the England defence, Southgate made a second switch, bringing on Henderson for Rice. Italy continued to dominate, almost all the play taking place in England's half of the field. Chiesa ran down the left in the 80th minute, beating Walker and Saka, before being dispossessed by Phillips and falling to the ground. The referee deemed the challenge to have been a legal one; however, Chiesa was injured and limped off the field. He attempted to continue but eventually had to be replaced by Federico Bernardeschi in the 86th minute. Meanwhile, England had a chance when Mount dribbled into the Italy penalty area and passed to Saka, but he was unable to control the ball. Insigne was then booked for a foul on Phillips; England's free kick was cleared by Italy as far as Shaw, whose shot was then fired over the crossbar. In the 87th minute, the match was briefly halted when a pitch invader ran onto the field. Sterling made a run down the left into the penalty area in the 89th minute, but the ball went behind for a goal kick under pressure from Bonucci and Chiellini. An England free kick in injury time reached Stones, but he was unable to score. After Italy had advanced down the right through Cristante, Walker chested the ball to Pickford. In the last act of normal time, Saka broke free from Chiellini on the right-hand side. Chiellini grabbed Saka's shirt from behind, hauling him to the ground. Chiellini received a yellow card for the professional foul, but the attack was halted, the resulting free kick was cleared and the game went to extra time.

==== Extra time ====
Italy manager Mancini made a substitution early in extra time, bringing on Andrea Belotti for Insigne, the last of Italy's three starting attackers. He then replaced Verratti with Locatelli. In the 96th minute, Sterling ran in from the left, following a pass by Henderson. In what the Sky Sports live commentary team described as a "big, big chance for England", Sterling tried to find Kane or Saka in the middle, but Italy's Chiellini cleared for a corner. The corner led to a chance for England through Phillips, but his low shot went wide and Donnarumma had it covered. In the 99th minute, Jack Grealish came on for England, replacing Mount. Phillips was then fouled just outside the area, but the referee chose to play advantage instead of giving England a free kick and the attack broke down. Grealish had his first chance to attack in the 101st minute, taking the ball into the penalty area and passing to Saka, but it was deflected and failed to reach him. Italy then had a chance in the 103rd minute, when Emerson Palmieri beat Walker and crossed to Bernardeschi. The Italy winger failed to make contact with the ball and Pickford was able to punch the ball clear. The first half of extra time finished with the score still at 1–1.

Maguire earned England's first yellow card of the match for a foul on Belotti in the 106th minute. The resulting free kick was fired through England's wall by Bernardeschi, but Pickford saved before retrieving the rebound himself to end the danger. In the 108th minute, Walker sent a long throw-in into the Italian penalty area, which was cleared by Italy as far as Kane; England's captain crossed the ball in, but Donnarumma was able to put Stones off enough to prevent him heading in the winning goal. Sterling beat Chiellini close to the Italian by-line in the 111th minute, but the Italian then won the ball back and was able to clear. Two minutes later, Jorginho fouled Grealish as the two of them challenged for the ball, stamping on his thigh and receiving a booking. With the end of extra time approaching, both teams made late substitutions; Florenzi came on for Italy in place of Emerson, while Jadon Sancho and Marcus Rashford replaced Walker and Henderson for England. With no further significant attacks, the game finished 1–1 after extra time and went to a penalty shoot-out.

==== Penalty shoot-out ====
A coin toss was held to determine which order the kicks would be taken in the penalty-shootout, which was won by Italy, and they chose to kick first. The shoot-out took place at the goal behind which many England fans were situated. Both sides' first penalties (from Berardi and Kane) were successful. England goalkeeper Pickford then saved from Belotti, before Maguire converted his kick to give England a 2–1 advantage. Bonucci scored to level the shoot-out at 2–2, before late substitute Rashford hit the left-hand post with England's third penalty. Bernardeschi gave Italy the lead again with a low shot down the middle, before England's other late substitute Sancho had his shot to the right saved by Donnarumma. Jorginho stepped up to take the possible match-winning penalty for Italy, looking to repeat his feat from the semi-final shoot-out victory over Spain, but had his shot to the left of the goal saved by Pickford. With the score 3–2 to Italy, Saka took England's fifth penalty, using his peculiar run-up style (dubbed "Moussakette"), looking to equalise and send the shoot-out to sudden death, but Donnarumma dived to his left and saved it to secure Italy's second European Championship.

=== Details ===
11 July 2021
20:00 BST

Italy	1–1 (a.e.t.)	England
Bonucci 67'	Report	Shaw 2'
Penalties
Berardi (penalty scored); Belotti (penalty missed); Bonucci (penalty scored); Bernardeschi (penalty scored); Jorginho (penalty missed)	3–2	(penalty scored) Kane; (penalty scored) Maguire; (penalty missed) Rashford; (penalty missed) Sancho; (penalty missed) Saka

Wembley Stadium, London
Attendance: 67,173
Referee: Björn Kuipers (Netherlands)

Italy	England

GK	21	Gianluigi Donnarumma
RB	2	Giovanni Di Lorenzo
CB	19	Leonardo Bonucci	(yellow card) 55'
CB	3	Giorgio Chiellini (c)	(yellow card) 90+6'
LB	13	Emerson Palmieri		(substituted off) 118'
DM	8	Jorginho	(yellow card) 114'
CM	18	Nicolò Barella	(yellow card) 47'	(substituted off) 54'
CM	6	Marco Verratti		(substituted off) 96'
RW	14	Federico Chiesa		(substituted off) 86'
LW	10	Lorenzo Insigne	(yellow card) 85'	(substituted off) 91'
CF	17	Ciro Immobile		(substituted off) 54'
Substitutions:
MF	16	Bryan Cristante		(substituted on) 54'
MF	11	Domenico Berardi		(substituted on) 54'
MF	20	Federico Bernardeschi		(substituted on) 86'
FW	9	Andrea Belotti		(substituted on) 91'
MF	5	Manuel Locatelli		(substituted on) 96'
DF	24	Alessandro Florenzi		(substituted on) 118'
Manager:
Roberto Mancini

GK	1	Jordan Pickford
CB	2	Kyle Walker		(substituted off) 120'
CB	5	John Stones
CB	6	Harry Maguire	(yellow card) 106'
RWB	12	Kieran Trippier		(substituted off) 71'
LWB	3	Luke Shaw
CM	14	Kalvin Phillips
CM	4	Declan Rice		(substituted off) 74'
RW	10	Raheem Sterling
LW	19	Mason Mount		(substituted off) 99'
CF	9	Harry Kane (c)
Substitutions:
MF	25	Bukayo Saka		(substituted on) 71'
MF	8	Jordan Henderson		(substituted on) 74'	(substituted off) 120'
MF	7	Jack Grealish		(substituted on) 99'
FW	11	Marcus Rashford			(substituted on) 120'
MF	17	Jadon Sancho		(substituted on) 120'
Manager:
Gareth Southgate

Man of the Match:
Leonardo Bonucci (Italy)

Assistant referees:
Sander van Roekel (Netherlands)
Erwin Zeinstra (Netherlands)
Fourth official:
Carlos del Cerro Grande (Spain)
Reserve assistant referee:
Juan Carlos Yuste Jiménez (Spain)
Video assistant referee:
Bastian Dankert (Germany)
Assistant video assistant referees:
Pol van Boekel (Netherlands)
Christian Gittelmann (Germany)
Marco Fritz (Germany)

Match rules

- 90 minutes
- 30 minutes of extra time if necessary
- Penalty shoot-out if scores still level
- Maximum of twelve named substitutes
- Maximum of five substitutions, with a sixth allowed in extra time
- Maximum of three substitution opportunities, with a fourth allowed in extra time

=== Statistics ===
First half
Statistic	Italy	England
Goals scored	0	1
Total shots	6	1
Shots on target	1	1
Saves	0	1
Ball possession	61%	39%
Corner kicks	1	2
Fouls committed	6	5
Offsides	2	1
Yellow cards	0	0
Red cards	0	0

Second half
Statistic	Italy	England
Goals scored	1	0
Total shots	9	3
Shots on target	4	0
Saves	0	3
Ball possession	65%	35%
Corner kicks	1	2
Fouls committed	10	2
Offsides	0	0
Yellow cards	4	0
Red cards	0	0

Extra time
Statistic	Italy	England
Goals scored	0	0
Total shots	5	2
Shots on target	1	0
Saves	0	1
Ball possession	57%	43%
Corner kicks	1	1
Fouls committed	5	6
Offsides	3	0
Yellow cards	1	1
Red cards	0	0

Overall
Statistic	Italy	England
Goals scored	1	1
Total shots	20	6
Shots on target	6	1
Saves	0	5
Ball possession	61%	39%
Corner kicks	3	5
Fouls committed	21	13
Offsides	5	1
Yellow cards	5	1
Red cards	0	0

== Post-match ==
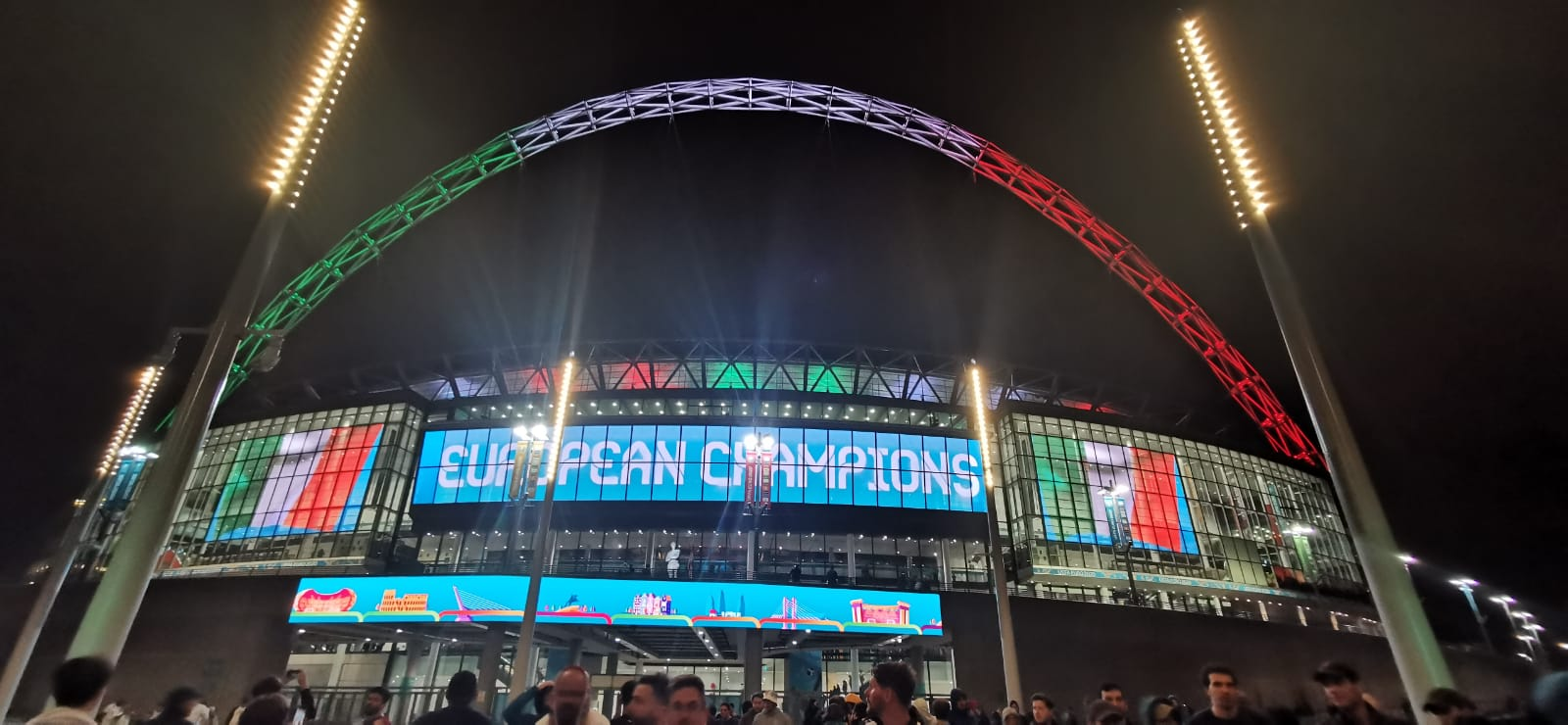
Wembley Stadium lit up in the colours of the Italian flag following Italy's victory

UEFA president Aleksander Čeferin was present on the pitch stage during the awards ceremony to hand out the medals and present the trophy to the Italian captain Chiellini. He was joined by UEFA general secretary Theodore Theodoridis, Italian Football Federation president Gabriele Gravina and the Football Association's interim chairman Peter McCormick. Eder, who scored the winning goal for Portugal in the previous final, brought the trophy onto the pitch for the ceremony. Most of the English players removed the runners-up medals from their necks immediately after receiving them. The win on penalties secured Italy's second UEFA European Championship title, 53 years after their first title in 1968, the longest duration between European Championship titles. They also became the fourth team to win multiple European Championship titles, equal with France's two titles and one short of the three each won by Spain and Germany. The match was the seventh European Championship final to go to extra time (after 1960, 1968, 1976, 1996, 2000 and 2016) and the second to be decided on penalties (after 1976). Italy became the first team to win two penalty shoot-outs at a single European Championship. It was also the third occasion a team emerged victorious in the final after trailing at half-time (after 1960 and 1968).

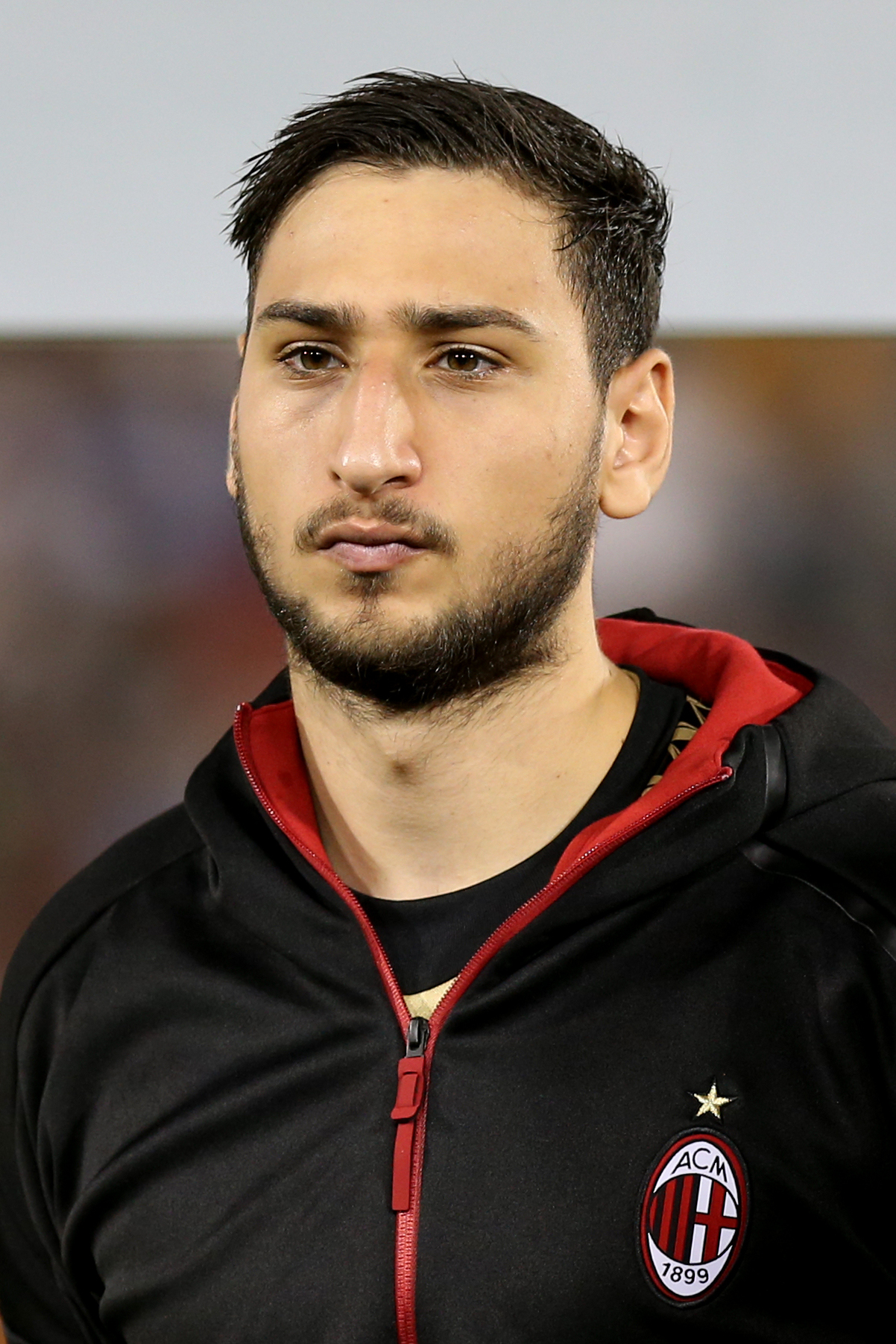
Gianluigi Donnarumma (pictured in 2016) of Italy became the first goalkeeper to be named European Championship Player of the Tournament.

Mancini said that he felt that he and his side deserved the victory, saying "Seeing everything we have managed to create, all of the hard work we have put in over the last three years, but specifically the last 50 days which have been very hard." He also claimed that "It wasn't an easy game and this one developed to become very difficult, but then we dominated it." Southgate was disappointed, but highlighted England's recent tournament results, saying "It feels like my stomach has been ripped out this morning. But the fact we have had the first signs of some consistency – a World Cup semi-final and a Euro final – has to be a step in the right direction." Reflecting on the game, he added that "We picked a team because of the tactical problem Italy posed. I think for the first 45 minutes, people would agree, that worked ... We couldn't keep the ball as well in the second half. They went for a false nine for a period of time, which was difficult. It was a difficult to solve. We didn't create the chances we would have liked to."

Chiellini later said that he had "cursed" Saka before his penalty miss, by shouting "Kiricocho" – a common superstitious term among footballers – as the England player struck the ball. Italy's goalkeeper Donnarumma explained that his lack of celebration upon saving Saka's strike was because he did not realise that his side had won the match. Kane said of his side's loss that "penalties are obviously the worst thing in the world when you lose. It wasn't our night but it's been a fantastic tournament and we should be proud, hold our heads up high."

Italian defender Bonucci was named as the man of the match, and his teammate Donnarumma was named as the UEFA European Championship Player of the Tournament, the first goalkeeper to win the award. Five players from the victorious Italian side were named in the UEFA European Championship Team of the Tournament: goalkeeper Donnarumma, defenders Bonucci and Spinazzola, midfielder Jorginho and forward Chiesa; England defenders Maguire and Walker, and forward Sterling were also named in the team. Jorginho became the 10th player to appear in and win the final of both the UEFA Champions League and European Championship in the same season, having won the Champions League final six weeks earlier with Chelsea. The Italy team celebrated their victory with a parade in Rome the day after the final on 12 July, attended by thousands. They travelled from the Villa Borghese gardens to the Quirinal Palace. At the Chigi Palace, the team met with Prime Minister of Italy Mario Draghi. On 16 July, all 26 members of Italy's squad for the tournament were awarded the Order of Merit of the Italian Republic.

Italy's La Gazzetta dello Sport ran the headline "Too beautiful" in honour of the victory. The Corriere dello Sport suggested that "The cup has returned home", and La Repubblica reported that "In the home of England, which is on a perpetual fast since the 1966 World Cup, and in the deafening theatre filled beyond the limits put in place by Covid, the Azzuri won their second European title." England's loss dominated the front pages of most of their national media the following day, including headlines such as "The ultimate agony ... penalties heartbreak again" in The Daily Telegraph and "So close" in The Guardian. Crowd disruption and the booing of national anthems was a common theme among European media reports after the final: Italy's Il Sole 24 Ore ran a headline of "Fights, howls, maskless crowds and racist slurs in the homeland of fair play" while German newspaper Die Zeit suggested that crowds overwhelming security personnel was "not only stupid, it was dangerous". French newspaper Libération asked "Where have the much-vaunted English qualities of fair play, respect and decency gone?" and Spain's El País reported that "In the hours leading up to the Euro final, groups of England fans took it upon themselves to ruin the good image that Gareth Southgate's squad had built up."

=== Racial abuse incidents ===
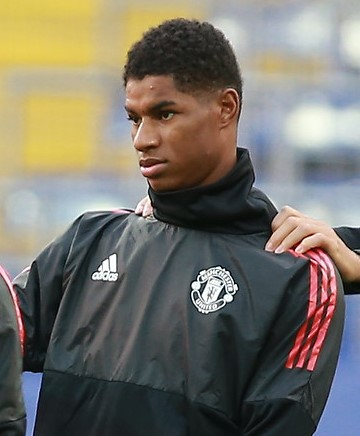
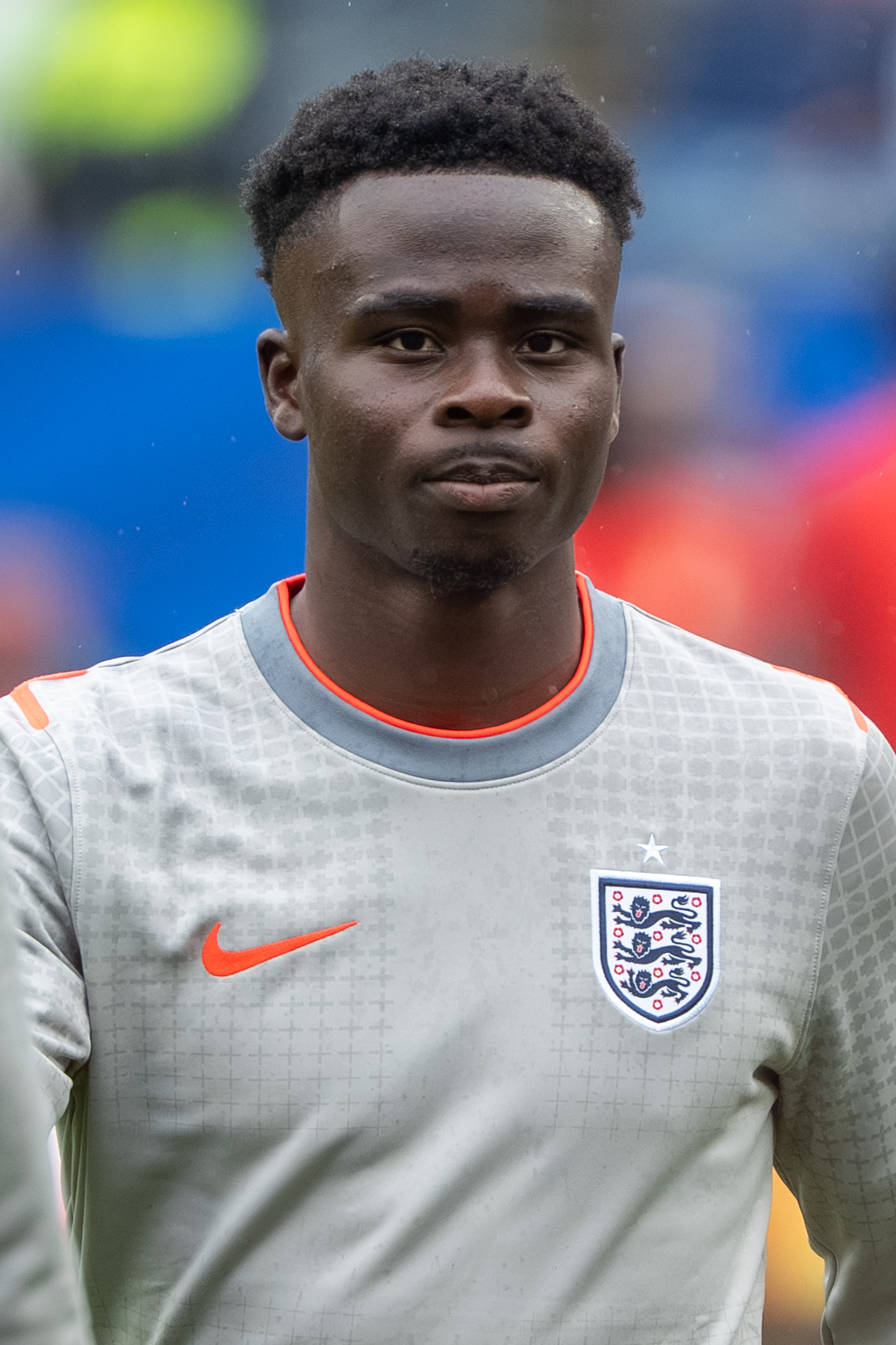
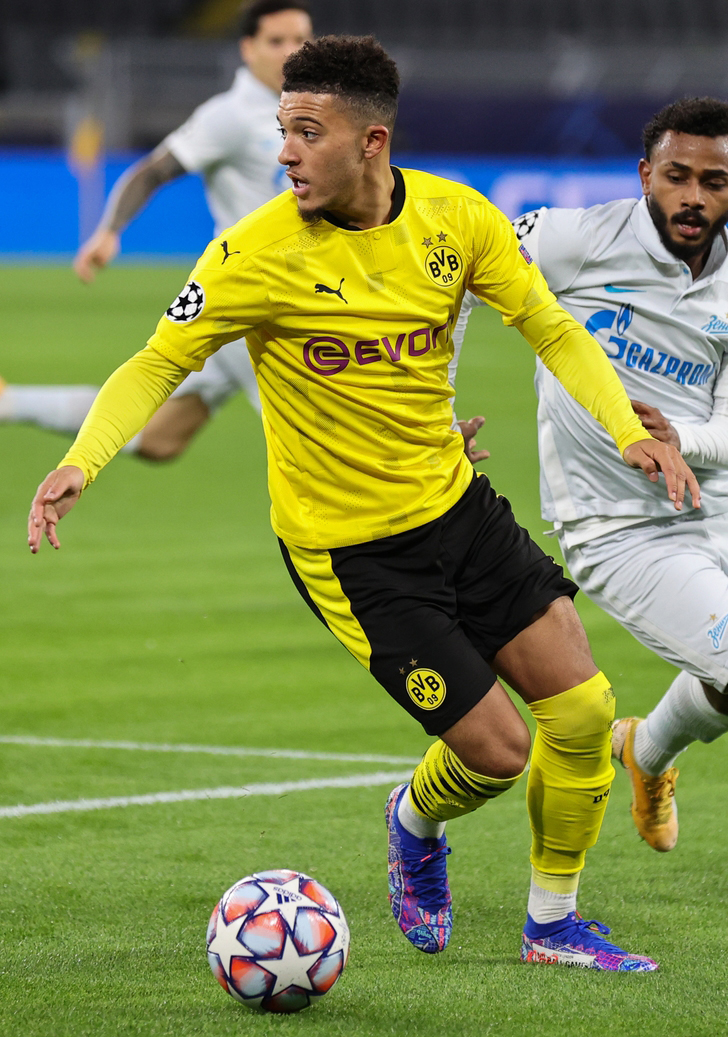
England's Marcus Rashford, Bukayo Saka, and Jadon Sancho (pictured in 2018, 2022, and 2020 respectively) were all subjected to online racial abuse after missing their penalties in the shootout.

After the game, England players Saka, Sancho and Rashford were subjected to racist abuse online after missing penalties in the shoot-out. The three were immediately targeted with racist language and emojis on their social media accounts. Sancho and Rashford were the last substitutions England made, brought on in the last minute to be able to take part in the penalty shoot-out.

The Football Association "strongly condemned" the racist abuse and said they were "appalled by the online racism" aimed at some players on social media. In a statement, they said: "We could not be clearer that anyone behind such disgusting behaviour is not welcome in following the team. We will do all we can to support the players affected while urging the toughest punishments possible for anyone responsible. We will continue to do everything we can to stamp discrimination out of the game, but we implore government to act quickly and bring in the appropriate legislation so this abuse has real life consequences. Social media companies need to step up and take accountability and action to ban abusers from their platforms, gather evidence that can lead to prosecution and support making their platforms free from this type of abhorrent abuse." The Metropolitan Police began investigating the abuse and said on Twitter that the abuse was "totally unacceptable" and would not be tolerated.

England manager Southgate said that "a lot of that has come from abroad, people who track these things are able to explain that, but not all of it." The BBC, the New Statesman and Reuters said that the global nature of the abuse could impede investigations and prosecutions; the latter two publications pointed out a study from anti-racism group Kick It Out, which found that 70% of online abuse of English-based players in the last two years came from abroad. The police received 600 reports of racist comments after the match and judged 207 to be criminal offences. Of these, 34 were from the UK and 123 from other countries; the remainder were unidentified as of 5 August. Details on the foreign accounts were passed on to the police in other countries.

Anti-discrimination researchers noted that the racist abuse directed at the England players reflected long-standing global patterns of hostility toward Black athletes. The Fare Network reported that Black footballers have historically been targets of discriminatory behaviour in Europe, North America, and Latin America, particularly after high-profile defeats or mistakes. According to reporting by The Independent, within minutes of Saka’s penalty being saved, his Instagram account was flooded with racist comments, including monkey emojis and other offensive messages on multiple Black players’ posts.

Boris Johnson, Leader of the Opposition Keir Starmer and the President of The Football Association, Prince William, Duke of Cambridge, also condemned the racist abuse. A mural in Manchester honouring Rashford was defaced soon after the match. The Mayor of Greater Manchester Andy Burnham condemned the vandalism, calling it a "despicable, shameful act", and a police investigation was launched into the incident. The mural was later decorated with hearts, flags and supportive messages by members of the public, and was restored two days later. Greater Manchester Police later said they thought the vandalism of the Rashford mural was "not racial". During Prime Minister's Questions at the House of Commons of the United Kingdom in Westminster on 14 July 2021, Johnson vowed to ban those responsible for online racial abuse from attending live football matches at stadiums. Johnson also hoped that the Britain and Ireland's proposed bid to host the 2030 FIFA World Cup had not been derailed by the scenes of crowd trouble at the final. On 15 July, police arrested four people in connection to the online abuse.

Over the period of three days after the game, Saka, Sancho and Rashford expressed their gratitude for the support they received on their social media accounts. Rashford apologised for his penalty miss but said he "won't apologise" for who he is and where he came from. Sancho said "hate will never win" and "as a society we need to do better and hold these people accountable", and Saka said he "knew instantly the kind of hate" he was going to receive after the defeat.

=== Commemorative street art ===
On 13 July 2021, a mural by street artist MurWalls depicting Gareth Southgate, Harry Kane and Raheem Sterling was unveiled in Vinegar Yard, London Bridge, London. A digital mural in Manchester featuring the three players that were racially abused (Saka, Sancho and Rashford) was also unveiled.

=== UEFA investigation ===
Following the chaotic scenes, UEFA opened a disciplinary case against The Football Association for the invasion of the pitch by an England supporter, throwing of objects by supporters, booing during the Italian national anthem and the lighting of a firework. On 3 August, UEFA opened disciplinary proceedings against The Football Association for the behaviour of fans at the final.

On 18 October, UEFA punished the Football Association for the unrest at the final by ordering England to play their next UEFA competition home match behind closed doors. In addition, UEFA imposed a ban for a second game, suspended for two years and fined the FA £84,560 (€100,000).

=== COVID-19 exposure ===
In mid-August, data emerged that showed 2,295 people in or around the stadium on the day of the final were likely infectious with COVID-19, with another 3,404 people in and around the ground potentially being infectious. Data from NHS Test and Trace showed that more than 9,000 COVID-19 cases were linked to Euro 2020 as a whole.

=== Aftermath ===
In September 2021, UEFA and CONMEBOL announced the winners of the European Championship and Copa América would face each other in an intercontinental match, beginning in 2022, as a revival of the former Artemio Franchi Cup. Italy later played 2021 Copa América winners Argentina, in the "Finalissima", at Wembley in June 2022, a match Italy lost 3–0.

Three months after Euro 2020, Italy competed for another trophy in the 2021 UEFA Nations League Finals, UEFA's secondary national team competition. As hosts of the tournament, they lost their semi-final 2–1 in a rematch against Spain, ending their world-record 37-game unbeaten run. Italy ultimately finished third after defeating Belgium 2–1.

After winning their opening three World Cup qualifiers in March 2021, Italy only won one of their remaining five group matches after Euro 2020, drawing the remaining four. As a result, they entered the UEFA play-offs, where they were drawn at home to face North Macedonia in the semi-finals. Italy lost the game 1–0, conceding a goal in injury time at the end of the game which eliminated them from the World Cup. As a result, they became the fourth reigning European champions to miss the subsequent World Cup.

Following Euro 2020, England won five of their remaining seven World Cup qualifiers to win their group undefeated and qualify for the 2022 FIFA World Cup in Qatar.

== Broadcasting and viewership ==
ITV and the BBC, the state broadcaster, both showed the game live on television in the United Kingdom. ITV's coverage of the game began at 18:30 local time and was presented by Mark Pougatch with punditry from Roy Keane, Ian Wright and Gary Neville, and pitchside analysis from Ashley Cole and Emma Hayes. ITV's commentators for the match were Sam Matterface and Lee Dixon. The BBC began its television coverage on BBC One 10 minutes earlier than ITV, and had Alan Shearer, Rio Ferdinand and Frank Lampard as its game analysts, alongside presenter Gary Lineker; commentators Guy Mowbray and Jermaine Jenas were supported by pitchside analysis from Jürgen Klinsmann and Alex Scott.

In Italy, the final was covered by state broadcaster RAI and pay TV broadcaster Sky Italia. After Alberto Rimedio tested positive for COVID-19, he and Antonio Di Gennaro were replaced as commentators on RAI's coverage by Stefano Bizzotto and Katia Serra. Fabio Caressa and Giuseppe Bergomi were the commentators for Sky.

In the United Kingdom, the match's viewership on television peaked at 30.95 million during the penalty shoot-out, the highest viewing figure for a live event since 1997 for the Funeral of Diana, Princess of Wales. Ratings also suggested that nearly 29.85 million people watched the entire match.

In Italy, the match drew a viewership of 18.17 million on Rai 1, which was 73.7% of the market share, and peaked at 18.54 million, with 78.7% of market share, on penalties. The match broadcast by Sky Italia drew an average of 2.43 million viewers (9.9% of market share) and peaked at a total of 3.16 million unique viewers. According to UEFA, the average TV audience globally for the final was 328 million.

== See also ==
- England at the UEFA European Championship
- Italy at the UEFA European Championship
