= Björn Kuipers =

Dutch football referee (born 1973)

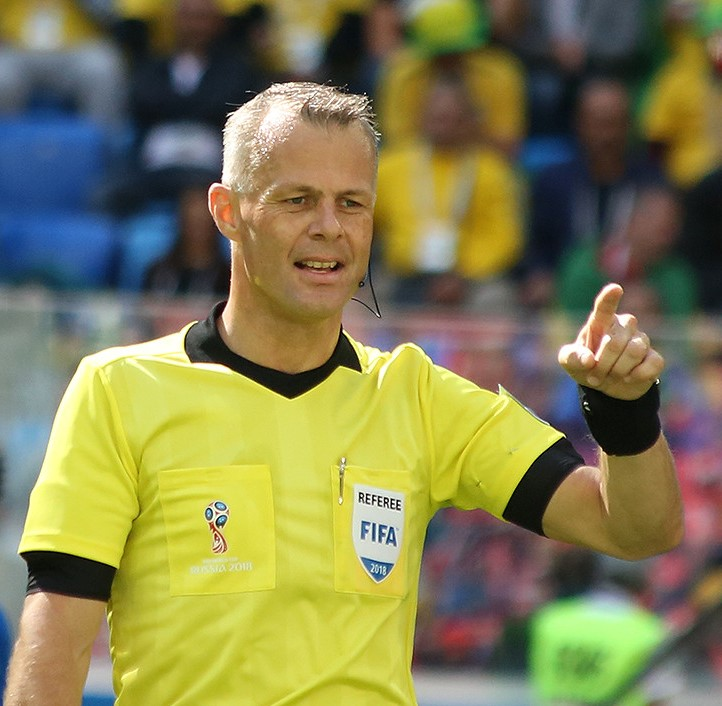
- Kuipers in Saint Petersburg during the 2018 FIFA World Cup
- Born: 28 March 1973 (age 53); Oldenzaal, Netherlands
- Other occupation: Supermarket owner

Domestic
Years	League	Role
2002–2021	Eerste Divisie	Referee
2005–2021	Eredivisie	Referee

International
Years	League	Role
2006–2021	FIFA listed	Referee
2009–2021	UEFA Elite	Referee

Björn Kuipers (Dutch: [ˈbjʏrəŋ ˈkœypərs; ˈbjʏrn -]; born 28 March 1973) is a former Dutch football referee. He was a FIFA listed referee from 2006 to 2021 and an UEFA Elite group referee from 2009 to 2021. He was assisted during international matches by Sander van Roekel and Erwin Zeinstra.

Kuipers has officiated at two World Cups and three European Championship tournaments. It was announced on 29 July 2021 that Kuipers would be retiring from refereeing, officiating his final match between Ajax and PSV on 7 August in the 2021 Johan Cruyff Shield.

== Refereeing career ==
=== Domestic career ===
Kuipers's debut professional domestic match as a referee was a second-tier clash between SC Telstar and MVV at the Rabobank IJmond Stadion in IJmuiden on 20 September 2002. He was inducted into the A-List of referees of the Royal Dutch Football Association (KNVB) and has refereed in every season of the top-tier Dutch league Eredivisie from 2005. At the domestic level, he has also overseen several important matches as a referee in the Eerste Divisie, the KNVB Beker and the Johan Cruijff Schaal.

Kuipers took charge of his debut professional domestic final when he was chosen to referee the 2009 Johan Cruijff Schaal match between Heerenveen and AZ at the Amsterdam Arena in Amsterdam on 25 July 2009.

Kuipers officiated in the second Dutch Super Cup match of his career when he oversaw the 2012 Johan Cruijff Schaal clash between PSV Eindhoven and Ajax at the Amsterdam Arena in Amsterdam on 5 August 2012.

Kuipers's opportunity to referee his first Dutch Cup final came when he was in charge of the 2013 KNVB Beker Final between AZ and PSV Eindhoven at De Kuip in Rotterdam on 9 May 2013. Kuipers got the chance to oversee his second Dutch Cup final came when he was selected to take charge of the 2016 KNVB Beker Final between Feyenoord and Utrecht at De Kuip in Rotterdam on 24 April 2016.

On 29 July 2021, it was announced that Kuipers would be retiring from refereeing. His final game was on 7 August 2021 where he refereed the Johan Cruijff Schaal, the Dutch Super Cup game between Ajax and PSV. Kuipers still had doubts about retiring after refereeing the UEFA Euro 2020 Final. But after time away on vacation he said in an interview with KNVB; “I realised I’ve been everywhere and experienced everything. I will not get more beautiful. There’s no better moment to stop”.

=== International career ===
==== 2006–2012 ====
Kuipers was awarded his FIFA badge in 2006. During the initial stages of his career, Kuipers officiated in junior-level tournaments like the UEFA European Under-17 Championship and the UEFA European Under-21 Championship. In June 2009, he was inducted into the UEFA Elite group of referees and became eligible to officiate at the highest level within European football. Kuipers has since then taken charge of several big matches in major tournaments such as the UEFA Europa League, the UEFA Champions League, the FIFA Club World Cup, the FIFA U-20 World Cup, the UEFA European Championship, the FIFA Confederations Cup and the FIFA World Cup.

During the initial stages of his career, Kuipers refereed the 2006 UEFA European Under-17 Championship Final between Czech Republic and Russia in Luxembourg on 14 May 2006 and also the 2009 UEFA European Under-21 Championship Final between Germany and England in Sweden on 29 June 2009.

During the 2010 FIFA Club World Cup, Kuipers was appointed to referee the semi-final match between Mazembe and Internacional at the Mohammed Bin Zayed Stadium in Abu Dhabi on 14 December 2010. Kuipers officiated in the first major European final of his career when he oversaw the 2011 UEFA Super Cup match between Barcelona and Porto at the Stade Louis II in Monaco on 26 August 2011.

==== 2012–2014 ====
During the UEFA Euro 2012, he refereed the Group C match between Republic of Ireland and Croatia at the Stadion Miejski in Poznań. He was also in charge of the Group D match between co-hosts Ukraine and France at the Donbas Arena in Donetsk, where he had to take the rare step of suspending the match due to a torrential electrical storm. Kuipers took charge of the 2013 UEFA Europa League Final between Benfica and Chelsea at the Amsterdam Arena in Amsterdam on 15 May 2013. In doing so, he became the first referee to officiate in a major UEFA club final in his home nation since Italy's Tullio Lanese in the 1991 European Cup Final in Bari.

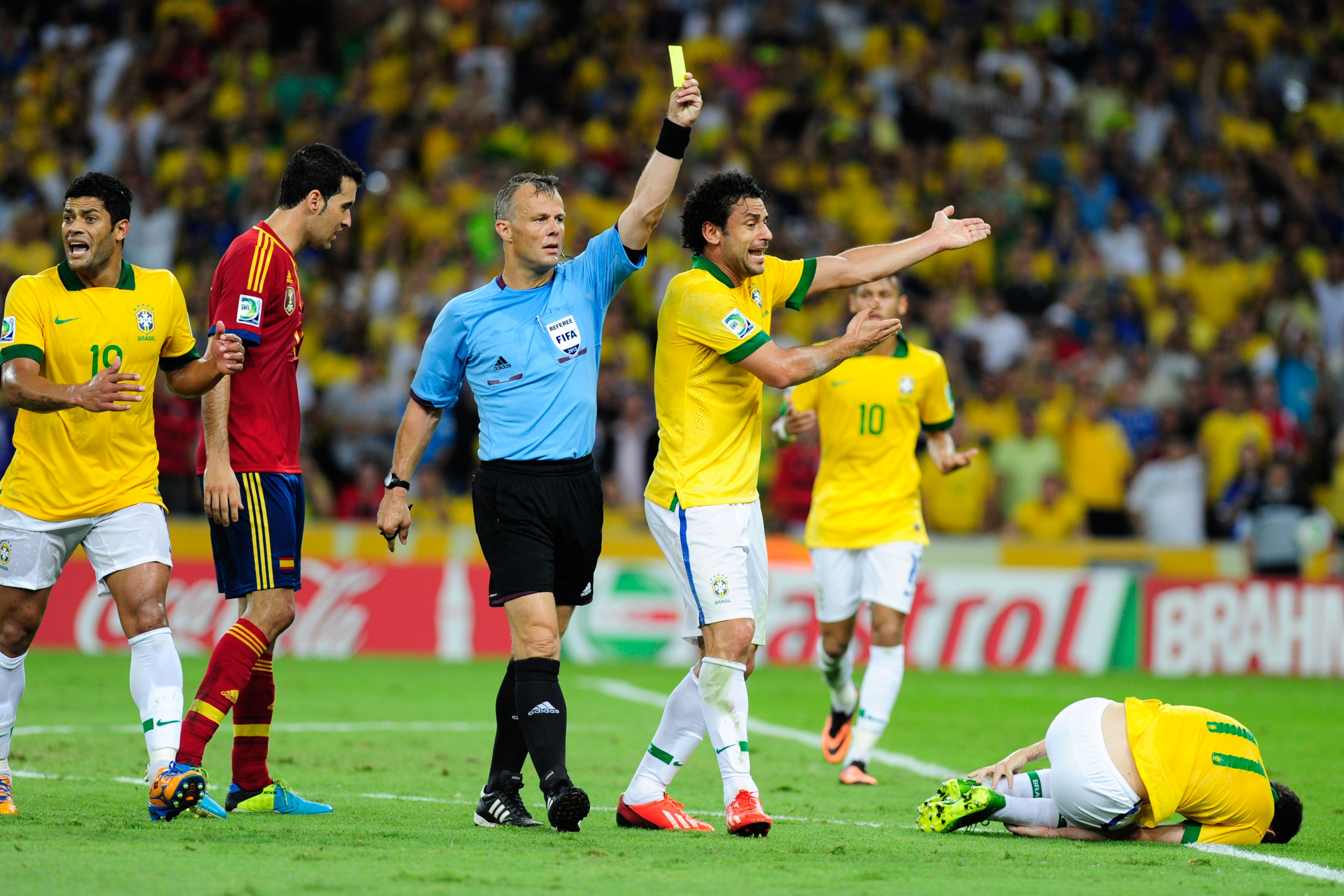
Kuipers during the 2013 FIFA Confederations Cup

During the 2013 FIFA Confederations Cup, he refereed the Group B match between Nigeria and Uruguay at the Itaipava Arena Fonte Nova in Salvador. Kuipers then oversaw the 2013 FIFA Confederations Cup Final between hosts Brazil and Spain at the Estádio do Maracanã in Rio de Janeiro on 30 June 2013.

Kuipers was selected to officiate in the 2014 UEFA Champions League Final between Real Madrid and Atlético Madrid at the Estádio do Sport Lisboa e Benfica in Lisbon on 24 May 2014. He became the fourth Dutch referee to take charge of a prestigious European Cup Final after Leo Horn (1957 and 1962), Charles Corver (1978) and Dick Jol (2001).

During the 2014 FIFA World Cup in Brazil, he oversaw the Group D match between England and Italy at the Arena da Amazônia in Manaus and the Group E match between Switzerland and France at the Itaipava Arena Fonte Nova in Salvador. Kuipers went on to referee the round of 16 match between Colombia and Uruguay at the Estádio do Maracanã in Rio de Janeiro on 28 June 2014.

==== 2014–2021 ====
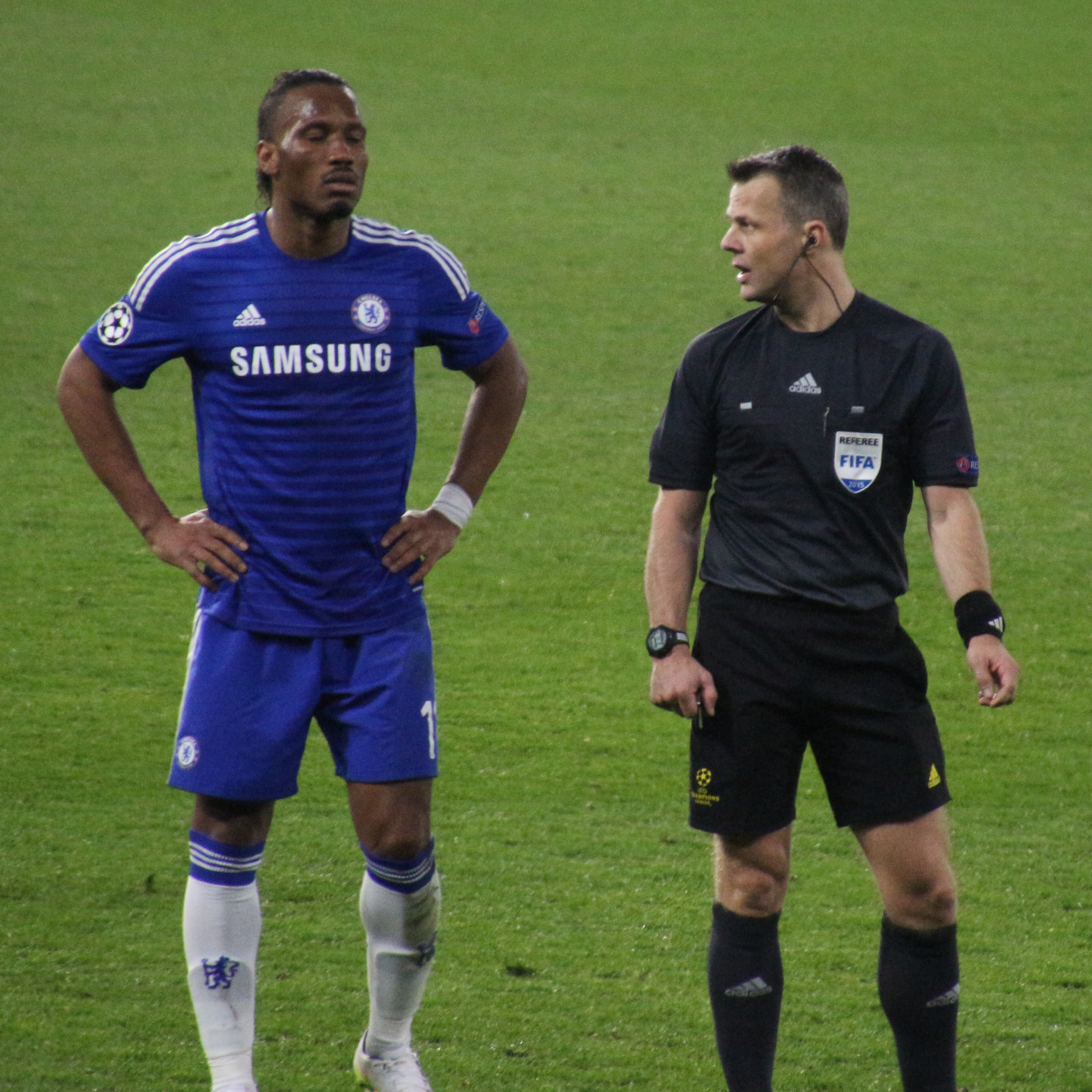
Kuipers refereeing a Champions League match between Paris Saint-Germain and Chelsea, March 2015

During the UEFA Euro 2016, he was in charge of the Group C match between Germany and Poland at the Stade de France in Saint-Denis and the Group D match between Croatia and Spain at the Nouveau Stade de Bordeaux in Bordeaux. Kuipers was then appointed to referee the quarter-final match between hosts France and Iceland at the Stade de France in Saint-Denis on 3 July 2016.

Kuipers added to his list of FIFA tournament finals when he took charge of the 2017 FIFA U-20 World Cup Final between Venezuela and England at the Suwon World Cup Stadium in Suwon on 11 May 2017. Kuipers was appointed to officiate in the 2018 UEFA Europa League Final between Marseille and Atlético Madrid at the Stade de Lyon in Lyon on 16 May 2018. This was his second UEFA Europa League Final assignment.

During the 2018 FIFA World Cup in Russia, he was in charge of the Group A match between Egypt and Uruguay at the Central Stadium in Ekaterinburg and the Group E match between Brazil and Costa Rica at the Saint Petersburg Stadium in Saint Petersburg. Kuipers went on to referee the Round of 16 match between Spain and Russia at the Luzhniki Stadium in Moscow on 1 July 2018 and also oversaw the quarter-final match between Sweden and England at the Samara Arena in Samara on 7 July 2018. Kuipers also served as the fourth official for the 2018 FIFA World Cup Final.

After refereeing a 2021 Champions League semifinal match between Paris Saint-Germain and Manchester City that saw Ángel Di María sent off, Kuipers was accused by two PSG players of insulting them on the pitch. Manager Mauricio Pochettino called on UEFA to investigate.

On 8 July 2021, UEFA announced that Kuipers would referee the final of UEFA Euro 2020 to be played between Italy and England on 11 July 2021 at Wembley Stadium.

== Career highlights ==
=== International tournaments ===
- FIFA World Cup: 2014, 2018
- UEFA European Championship: 2012, 2016, 2020
- FIFA Confederations Cup: 2013
- FIFA U-20 World Cup: 2017
- FIFA Club World Cup: 2010
- UEFA European Under-17 Championship: 2006
- UEFA European Under-21 Championship: 2009

==== FIFA World Cup matches ====
2014 FIFA World Cup – Brazil
Date	Match	Venue	Round
14 June 2014	England – Italy	Manaus	Group stage
20 June 2014	Switzerland – France	Salvador	Group stage
28 June 2014	Colombia – Uruguay	Rio de Janeiro	Round of 16
2018 FIFA World Cup – Russia
Date	Match	Venue	Round
15 June 2018	Egypt – Uruguay	Ekaterinburg	Group stage
22 June 2018	Brazil – Costa Rica	Saint Petersburg	Group stage
1 July 2018	Spain – Russia	Moscow	Round of 16
7 July 2018	Sweden – England	Samara	Quarter-final

==== Major international final matches ====
2013 FIFA Confederations Cup – Brazil
Date	Match	Venue	Round
30 June 2013	Brazil – Spain (3–0)	Estádio do Maracanã, Rio de Janeiro	Final
UEFA Euro 2020 – Europe
Date	Match	Venue	Round
11 July 2021	Italy – England (1–1; 3–2 on penalties)	Wembley Stadium, London	Final

=== Domestic final matches ===
- 2008 KNVB Cup Final (fourth official)
- 2009 Johan Cruyff Shield
- 2012 Johan Cruyff Shield
- 2013 KNVB Cup Final
- 2016 KNVB Cup Final
- 2018 KNVB Cup Final
- 2020 Greek Football Cup Final
- 2021 KNVB Cup Final
- 2021 Johan Cruyff Shield

=== Continental final matches ===
Date	Match	Tournament	Venue	Result	Ref
26 August 2011	Barcelona vs Porto	2011 UEFA Super Cup final	Stade Louis II, Monaco	2–0	
15 May 2013	Benfica vs. Chelsea	2013 UEFA Europa League final	Amsterdam Arena, Amsterdam	1–2	
24 May 2014	Real Madrid vs. Atlético Madrid	2014 UEFA Champions League final	Estádio da Luz, Lisbon	4–1 (a.e.t.)	
16 May 2018	Marseille vs. Atlético Madrid	2018 UEFA Europa League final	Parc Olympique Lyonnais, Décines-Charpieu	0–3	

== Personal life ==
Björn Kuipers was born on 28 March 1973 in Oldenzaal in the Netherlands. His father was also a football referee at the amateur level. Kuipers studied business administration at the Radboud University Nijmegen and besides refereeing he is also the owner of a number of supermarkets and a hair studio in his hometown Oldenzaal.

== See also ==
- List of football referees

Sporting positions (Netherlands) Björn Kuipers appointments to international finals
Preceded by 2010 UEFA Super Cup (Switzerland) Massimo Busacca	2011 UEFA Super Cup	Succeeded by 2012 UEFA Super Cup (Slovenia) Damir Skomina
Preceded by 2012 UEFA Europa League final (Germany) Wolfgang Stark	2013 UEFA Europa League final	Succeeded by 2014 UEFA Europa League final (Germany) Felix Brych
Preceded by 2009 FIFA Confederations Cup final (Sweden) Martin Hansson	2013 FIFA Confederations Cup final	Succeeded by 2017 FIFA Confederations Cup final (Serbia) Milorad Mažić
Preceded by 2013 UEFA Champions League final (Italy) Nicola Rizzoli	2014 UEFA Champions League final	Succeeded by 2015 UEFA Champions League final (Turkey) Cüneyt Çakır
Preceded by 2017 UEFA Europa League final (Slovenia) Damir Skomina	2018 UEFA Europa League final	Succeeded by 2019 UEFA Europa League final (Italy) Gianluca Rocchi
Preceded by UEFA Euro 2016 final (England) Mark Clattenburg	UEFA Euro 2020 final	Succeeded by UEFA Euro 2024 final (France) François Letexier
