= Danny Makkelie =

Dutch football referee (born 1983)

- Makkelie at the 2026 FIFA World Cup
- Full name: Danny Desmond Makkelie
- Born: 28 January 1983 (age 43); Willemstad, Curaçao
- Other occupation: Team leader of national amateur refereeing, KNVB

Domestic
Years	League	Role
2009–	Eredivisie	Referee

International
Years	League	Role
2011–	FIFA listed	Referee

Danny Desmond Makkelie (born 28 January 1983) is a Dutch professional football referee. He worked for the Netherlands National Police in Rotterdam until 2023, where he was a police inspector and a hulpofficier van justitie, a senior officer authorised to carry out certain judicial powers. Since 2023 he has worked for the Royal Dutch Football Association (KNVB), where he leads the refereeing department for the national amateur competitions. He has been a FIFA listed referee since 2011 and is ranked as a UEFA elite category referee.

Makkelie was born in Willemstad, Curaçao, where his father was stationed as a serviceman. The family returned to the Netherlands and he grew up in Dordrecht. He started refereeing at the age of ten, and in 2009 he became the youngest referee in the Eredivisie.

== Career ==
He took charge of the final of the 2012 UEFA European Under-19 Football Championship as a UEFA Elite referee. He was an additional assistant referee at the 2018 UEFA Europa League Final, and on 18 August 2020 UEFA appointed him, then 37, to referee the 2020 UEFA Europa League Final between Sevilla and Inter Milan. Later that year he refereed the semifinal between Brazil's Palmeiras and Mexico's UANL at the 2020 FIFA Club World Cup in Qatar.

Makkelie was selected for UEFA Euro 2020, where he took charge of two group stage matches, the round of 16 match between England and Germany and the Wembley semi-final between England and Denmark. His decision to award England a penalty in extra time of the semi-final, for a foul on Raheem Sterling, drew criticism in the media. UEFA referees' committee chairman Roberto Rosetti said the decision was correct, played the audio in which the video assistant referee confirmed the penalty, and called it "not a scandal".

At the 2022 FIFA World Cup he refereed two group stage matches, including Spain against Germany.

In April 2024, Makkelie was selected for UEFA Euro 2024 in Germany, where he again took charge of two group stage matches. In the match between Italy and Croatia he added eight minutes of stoppage time, and Italy scored in the 98th minute to make it 1–1, which put Croatia out. Croatia captain Luka Modrić and coach Zlatko Dalić were unhappy with how much time he added.

In December 2024 he took charge of the Derby of the Americas between Botafogo and Pachuca at the 2024 FIFA Intercontinental Cup. At the 2025 FIFA Club World Cup in the United States he refereed the quarter-final between Fluminense and Al-Hilal.

In the 2025–26 season, Makkelie was appointed to eight UEFA Champions League matches, including the semi-final first leg between Atlético Madrid and Arsenal on 29 April 2026, his fourth Champions League semi-final.

In April 2026, FIFA selected Makkelie as the only Dutch referee for the 2026 FIFA World Cup in the United States, Canada and Mexico, his second consecutive World Cup. He refereed the match between the United States and Paraguay in Inglewood, during which he made the first video assistant referee intervention for mistaken identity in World Cup history, rescinding a yellow card shown to Tim Ream and instead cautioning Miguel Almirón for simulation. He also officiated Morocco vs Haiti and the round of 32 match between France and Sweden, and was fourth official for Canada vs Morocco.

In September 2026 Makkelie was appointed to the 27th Arabian Gulf Cup in Jeddah, Saudi Arabia. He refereed Saudi Arabia against Iraq in the group stage and the semi-final between the United Arab Emirates and Oman.

== Video assistant refereeing ==
Makkelie was involved in the testing of video assistant referee technology at the KNVB and officiated the first Dutch match played with VAR. He was the video assistant referee at the 2016 FIFA Club World Cup Final, the first international match played with VAR, and later at the 2017 FIFA U-20 World Cup Final, the 2018 FIFA World Cup Final and the 2019 UEFA Champions League Final. At the 2019 FIFA Women's World Cup he was also video assistant referee, and applied the new law allowing penalties to be retaken in the France–Nigeria and Jamaica–Italy matches.

== See also ==
- List of football referees

Sporting positions (Netherlands) Danny Makkelie
Preceded by 2019 (Italy) Gianluca Rocchi	UEFA Europa League Final Referee; 2020	Succeeded by 2021 (France) Clément Turpin
