= 2013 KNVB Cup final =

- Event: 2012–13 KNVB Cup
AZ	PSV Eindhoven
2	1
- Date: 9 May 2013
- Venue: De Kuip, Rotterdam
- Referee: Björn Kuipers
- Attendance: 50,000

The 2013 KNVB Cup final was a football match between AZ and PSV Eindhoven that took place on 9 May 2013 at De Kuip, Rotterdam. It was the final match of the 2012–13 KNVB Cup competition and the 95th Dutch Cup Final.

AZ won the match 2–1 to defeat the defending champions from the previous season to earn their 4th KNVB Cup trophy.

== Route to the final ==
AZ		Round	PSV Eindhoven	
Opponent	Result		Opponent	Result
SC Veendam	4−1 (H)	Second round	Achilles '29	2−3 (A)
SWZ Sneek	1−4 (A)	Third round	EHC Norad	3−1 (H)
FC Dordrecht	2−4 (A)	Fourth round	Rijnsburgse Boys	0−4 (A)
FC Den Bosch	0−5 (A)	Quarter-finals	Feyenoord	2−1 (H)
Ajax	0−3 (A)	Semi-finals	PEC Zwolle	0−3 (A)

== Match ==
=== Details ===
9 May 2013
18:00 CEST

AZ	2–1	PSV Eindhoven
Maher 12'; Altidore 14'	Report	Locadia 31'

De Kuip, Rotterdam
Attendance: 50,000
Referee: Björn Kuipers

AZ	PSV Eindhoven

GK	1	(Costa Rica) Esteban Alvarado
RB	3	(Netherlands) Dirk Marcellis	(substituted off) 67'
CB	4	(Netherlands) Nick Viergever (c)
CB	6	(Netherlands) Etiënne Reijnen
LB	32	(Netherlands) Giliano Wijnaldum
DM	12	(Sweden) Viktor Elm
CM	19	(Norway) Markus Henriksen
AM	8	(Netherlands) Adam Maher
LW	7	(Iceland) Jóhann Berg Guðmundsson	(substituted off) 88'
RW	23	(Netherlands) Roy Beerens
CF	17	(United States) Jozy Altidore	(substituted off) 74'
Substitutes:
RB	2	(Sweden) Mattias Johansson	(substituted on) 67'
LW	22	(Netherlands) Steven Berghuis	(substituted on) 74'
CF	20	(United States) Aron Jóhannsson	(substituted on) 88'
GK	16	(Belgium) Yves De Winter
DM	26	(Paraguay) Celso Ortiz
CM	5	(Netherlands) Donny Gorter
CM	10	(Cameroon) Willie Overtoom
Manager:
(Netherlands) Gertjan Verbeek

GK	21	(Netherlands) Boy Waterman
RB	13	(Canada) Atiba Hutchinson
CB	3	(Netherlands) Wilfred Bouma	(substituted off) 79'
CB	4	(Brazil) Marcelo
LB	15	(Netherlands) Jetro Willems
DM	6	(Netherlands) Mark van Bommel (c)
CM	8	(Netherlands) Kevin Strootman
AM	7	(Sweden) Ola Toivonen	(substituted off) 68'
LW	14	(Belgium) Dries Mertens	(substituted off) 85'
RW	11	(Netherlands) Jeremain Lens
CF	19	(Netherlands) Jürgen Locadia
Substitutes:
AM	10	(Netherlands) Georginio Wijnaldum	(substituted on) 68'
CF	9	(Slovenia) Tim Matavž	(substituted on) 79'
LW	22	(Netherlands) Memphis Depay	(substituted on) 85'
GK	1	(Poland) Przemysław Tytoń
RB	18	(Belgium) Timothy Derijck
LB	5	(Netherlands) Erik Pieters
CM	27	(Sweden) Oscar Hiljemark
Manager:
(Netherlands) Dick Advocaat

Match rules

- 90 minutes.
- 30 minutes of extra-time if necessary.
- Penalty shoot-out if scores still level.
- Maximum of three substitutions.
