= Carlos del Cerro Grande =

Spanish football referee

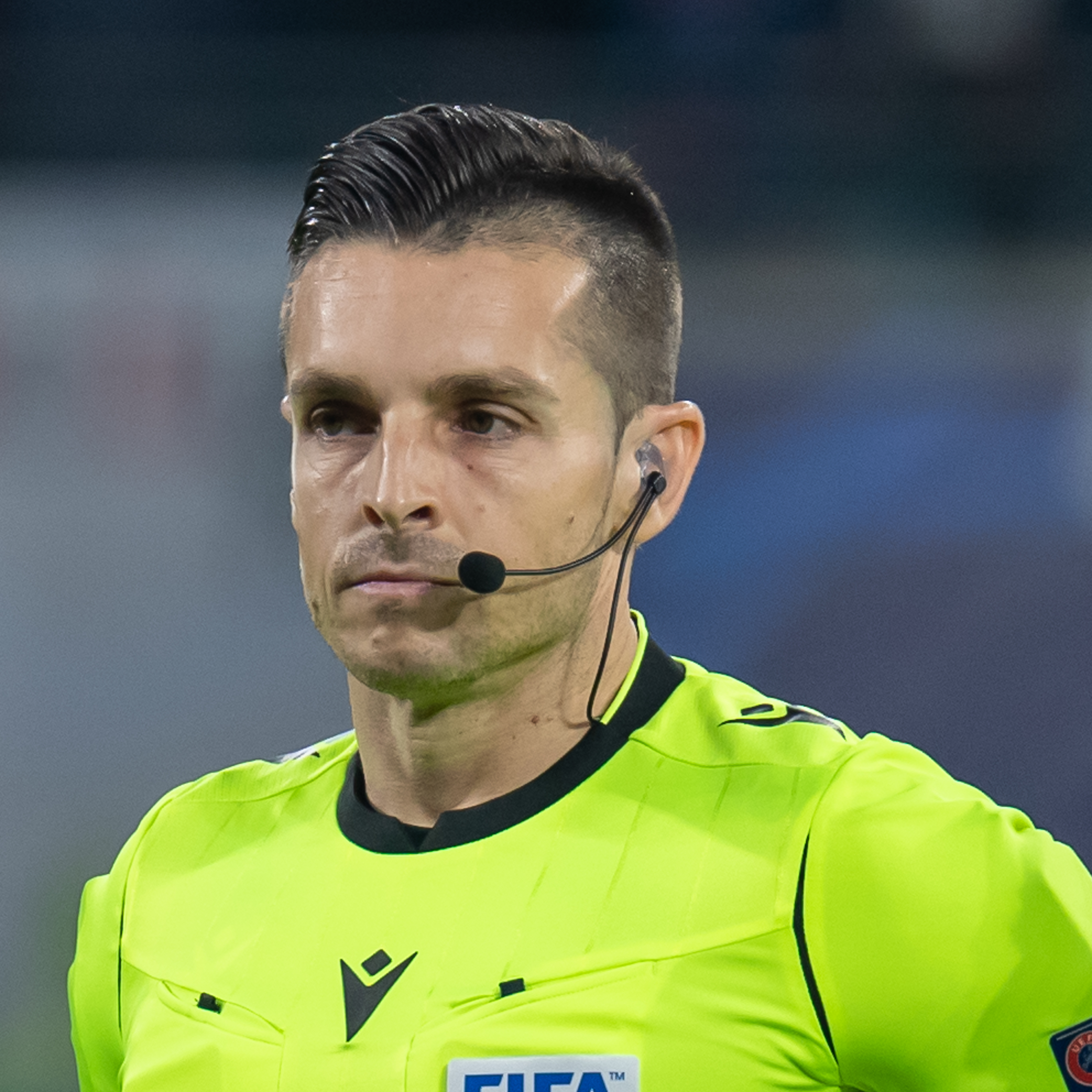
- Del Cerro in 2020
- Born: 13 March 1976 (age 50); Alcalá de Henares, Spain

Domestic
| Years | League | Role |
| 2000–2006 | Segunda División B | Referee |
| 2006–2011 | Segunda División | Referee |
| 2011–2023 | La Liga | Referee |

International
| Years | League | Role |
| 2013–2023 | FIFA listed | Referee |

Carlos del Cerro Grande (born 13 March 1976) is a Spanish football referee. He has been an international referee since 2013, with his debut coming in an international match on 26 May 2013 until 2023, between the under-19 teams of Scotland and Georgia.

On 15 June 2021, Del Cerro refereed in a major international finals match for the first time when he officiated the group match of Euro 2020 between France and Germany. He faced criticism for not calling a foul against Germany in their penalty area.

He served as the fourth official during the UEFA Euro 2020 final and 2021 UEFA Champions League final

He took charge of the UEFA Europa Conference League final between Fiorentina and West Ham United on 7 June 2023.

He is a video match official for the 2026 FIFA World Cup.

== See also ==
- List of football referees

Sporting positions
| Preceded by (Romania) István Kovács | UEFA Europa Conference League final referee 2023 | Succeeded by (Portugal) Artur Soares Dias |
