= 2017 FIFA U-20 World Cup final =

- Event: 2017 FIFA U-20 World Cup
| Venezuela | England |
| (Venezuela) | (England) |
| 0 | 1 |
- Date: 11 June 2017
- Venue: Suwon World Cup Stadium, Suwon
- Referee: Björn Kuipers (Netherlands)
- Attendance: 30,346
- Weather: Sunny; 27 °C (81 °F); 26% humidity

The 2017 FIFA U-20 World Cup final was a football match that was played on at the Suwon World Cup Stadium, Suwon, South Korea on 11 June 2017 to determine the champions of the 2017 FIFA U-20 World Cup. The final was contested by Venezuela and England. England won the match 1–0, winning the title for the first time. Dominic Calvert-Lewin scored his second goal of the tournament during the final, which turned out to be the only goal in the game. This was the first ever final for both England and Venezuela in the history of the tournament.

== Background ==
This was England's first appearance and victory in the final of a global football tournament since their senior World Cup victory in 1966. Their previous best at the U-20 World Cup was third place in 1993.

For Venezuela it was only the second appearance at the U-20 World Cup, previously in 2009 they only managed to go as far as the second round.

== Road to the final ==
Venezuela
Round
England
Opponent
Result
Group stage
Opponent
Result
Germany
2–0
Match 1
Argentina
3–0
Vanuatu
7–0
Match 2
Guinea
1–1
Mexico
1–0
Match 3
South Korea
1–0
Group B winners

| Pos | Team | Pld | W | D | L | GF | GA | GD | Pts | Qualification |
|---|---|---|---|---|---|---|---|---|---|---|
| 1 | Venezuela | 3 | 3 | 0 | 0 | 10 | 0 | +10 | 9 | Knockout stage |
| 2 | Mexico | 3 | 1 | 1 | 1 | 3 | 3 | 0 | 4 | Knockout stage |
| 3 | Germany | 3 | 1 | 1 | 1 | 3 | 4 | −1 | 4 | Knockout stage |
| 4 | Vanuatu | 3 | 0 | 0 | 3 | 4 | 13 | −9 | 0 | |

Source: FIFA
Rules for classification: Group stage tiebreakers
Final standings
Group A winners

| Pos | Team | Pld | W | D | L | GF | GA | GD | Pts | Qualification |
|---|---|---|---|---|---|---|---|---|---|---|
| 1 | England | 3 | 2 | 1 | 0 | 5 | 1 | +4 | 7 | Knockout stage |
| 2 | South Korea (H) | 3 | 2 | 0 | 1 | 5 | 2 | +3 | 6 | Knockout stage |
| 3 | Argentina | 3 | 1 | 0 | 2 | 6 | 5 | +1 | 3 | |
| 4 | Guinea | 3 | 0 | 1 | 2 | 1 | 9 | −8 | 1 | |

Source: FIFA
Rules for classification: Group stage tiebreakers
(H) Hosts
Opponent
Result
Knockout stage
Opponent
Result
Japan
1–0 (aet)
Round of 16
Costa Rica
2–1
United States
2–1 (aet)
Quarter-finals
Mexico
1–0
Uruguay
1–1 (aet) (4–3 pen.)
Semi-finals
Italy
3–1

== Match ==
=== Summary ===
The final was played on 11 June 2017 at the Suwon World Cup Stadium in Suwon. England defeated Venezuela 1–0. The win gave England the first title in the tournament.

Dominic Calvert-Lewin scored the winning goal in the 35th minute when he finished from close range after his initial effort was blocked by Wuilker Faríñez, but the rebound fell into his path. He made no mistake with his second chance.

England goalkeeper Freddie Woodman made two vital saves in the second half. The first was a one-on-one opportunity for Sergio Córdova created by Yeferson Soteldo, and the second from the penalty spot from Adalberto Peñaranda.

The match was evenly contested throughout, with both sides hitting the woodwork, but it was England's evening in the end, as the Young Lions held on to become U-20 World Cup champions for the first time.

After the match, England forward Dominic Solanke, was named the player of the tournament and received the Golden Ball. Previous winner of the award include Diego Maradona, Lionel Messi, Paul Pogba and Sergio Agüero.

Freddie Woodman was named the best goalkeeper of the tournament and received the Golden Glove award.

=== Details ===
11 June 2017
20:00 KST

| Venezuela | 0–1 | England |
|---|---|---|
| | Report | Calvert-Lewin 35' |

Suwon World Cup Stadium, Suwon
Attendance: 30,346
Referee: Björn Kuipers (Netherlands)

| Venezuela | England |

| GK | 1 | Wuilker Faríñez |
| CB | 5 | Williams Velásquez | (yellow card) 46' |
| CB | 4 | Nahuel Ferraresi |
| RB | 20 | Ronald Hernández |
| LB | 2 | José Hernández |
| CM | 8 | Yangel Herrera (c) |
| CM | 16 | Ronaldo Lucena |
| RW | 19 | Sergio Córdova | | (substituted off) 72' |
| LW | 7 | Adalberto Peñaranda | | (substituted off) 90+3' |
| CF | 11 | Ronaldo Chacón | | (substituted off) 51' |
| CF | 9 | Ronaldo Peña |
Substitutions:
| FW | 10 | Yeferson Soteldo | | (substituted on) 51' |
| MF | 15 | Samuel Sosa | | (substituted on) 72' |
| DF | 13 | Jan Hurtado | | (substituted on) 90+3' |
Coach:
Rafael Dudamel

| GK | 1 | Freddie Woodman |
| RB | 2 | Jonjoe Kenny |
| CB | 5 | Fikayo Tomori | (yellow card) 48' |
| CB | 6 | Jake Clarke-Salter |
| LB | 14 | Kyle Walker-Peters |
| DM | 4 | Lewis Cook (c) |
| DM | 7 | Josh Onomah |
| RM | 18 | Kieran Dowell | (yellow card) 58' | (substituted off) 62' |
| AM | 10 | Dominic Solanke |
| LM | 11 | Ademola Lookman |
| CF | 16 | Dominic Calvert-Lewin | | (substituted off) 76' |
Substitutions:
| MF | 19 | Sheyi Ojo | | (substituted on) 62' |
| MF | 8 | Ainsley Maitland-Niles | | (substituted on) 76' |
Coach:
Paul Simpson

Assistant referees:
Sander van Roekel (Netherlands)
Erwin Zeinstra (Netherlands)
Fourth official:
Julio Bascuñán (Chile)
Video assistant referees:
Daniele Orsato (Italy)
Simon Lount (New Zealand)
Assistant video assistant referee:
Danny Makkelie (Netherlands)

Match rules:

- 90 minutes.
- 30 minutes of extra time if necessary.
- Penalty shoot-out if scores still level.
- Ten named eligible substitutes.
- Maximum of three substitutions, with a fourth allowed in extra time.

=== Statistics ===
| Overall | Venezuela | England |
|---|---|---|
| Goals scored | 0 | 1 |
| Total shots | 19 | 20 |
| Shots on target | 4 | 8 |
| Shots blocked | 4 | 4 |
| Ball possession | 48% | 52% |
| Corner kicks | 3 | 9 |
| Fouls committed | 16 | 16 |
| Offsides | 0 | 1 |
| Saves | 7 | 4 |
| Yellow cards | 1 | 2 |
| Red cards | 0 | 0 |

== Reaction in England ==
England's win ended 51 years of waiting for a global tournament trophy. The senior England team watched the game from a laptop and applauded as the final whistle was blown. England's next trophy came just four months later when the under-17 side won the 2017 FIFA U-17 World Cup.

== See also ==
- 2017 FIFA U-20 World Cup
