= 2014–15 in German football =

Football in Germany
- Season: 2014–15

Men's football
- Bundesliga: Bayern Munich
- 2. Bundesliga: Ingolstadt 04
- 3. Liga: Arminia Bielefeld
- DFB-Pokal: VfL Wolfsburg
- DFL-Supercup: Borussia Dortmund

Women's football
- Frauen-Bundesliga: Bayern Munich
- DFB-Pokal: VfL Wolfsburg

The 2014–15 season was the 105th season of competitive football in Germany.

== Promotion and relegation ==
=== Pre–Season ===
League	Promoted to League	Relegated from League
Bundesliga	1. FC Köln; SC Paderborn	1. FC Nürnberg; Eintracht Braunschweig
2. Bundesliga	1. FC Heidenheim; RB Leipzig; SV Darmstadt 98	Dynamo Dresden; Energie Cottbus; Arminia Bielefeld
3. Liga	Mainz 05 II; Sonnenhof Großaspach; Fortuna Köln	SV Elversberg; SV Wacker Burghausen; 1. FC Saarbrücken
Bundesliga (women)	Herforder SV; SC Sand	VfL Sindelfingen; BV Cloppenburg
2. Bundesliga (women)	Alemannia Aachen; TSG 1899 Hoffenheim II; Holstein Kiel; 1. FFC Montabaur; 1. FC Union Berlin	TuS Wörrstadt; FC Viktoria 1889 Berlin; SC 07 Bad Neuenahr; USV Jena II; BW Hohen Neuendorf

=== Post–Season ===
League	Promoted to League	Relegated from League
Bundesliga	FC Ingolstadt 04; SV Darmstadt 98	SC Freiburg; SC Paderborn 07
2. Bundesliga	Arminia Bielefeld; MSV Duisburg	FC Erzgebirge Aue; VfR Aalen
3. Liga	Werder Bremen II; 1. FC Magdeburg; Würzburger Kickers	Borussia Dortmund II; SpVgg Unterhaching; SSV Jahn Regensburg
Bundesliga (women)	1. FC Köln; Werder Bremen	MSV Duisburg; Herforder SV
2. Bundesliga (women)	SV Henstedt-Ulzburg; Borussia Mönchengladbach; TSV Schott Mainz; Eintracht Wetzlar; BW Hohen Neuendorf	VfL Bochum; 1. FC Union Berlin; Magdeburger FFC; 1. FFC Montabaur; 1. FFC 08 Niederkirchen

== National teams ==
=== Germany national football team ===
After Germany won the 2014 FIFA World Cup, team captain Philipp Lahm announced his retirement from international football. Germany's record goalscorer Miroslav Klose also announced his retirement from international football. Per Mertesacker would join Lahm and Klose in retiring from international duty. On 2 September 2014, Bastian Schweinsteiger was announced as the new captain for Germany.

==== UEFA Euro 2016 qualifying ====
===== UEFA Euro 2016 qualifying review =====
Germany were drawn into Group D for UEFA Euro 2016 qualifying on 23 February 2014. The group also contains Georgia, Gibraltar, Ireland, Poland, and Scotland. Qualifying opened on 7 September 2014 with a match against Scotland in Dortmund. Germany won the match 2–1. Thomas Müller scored both goals for Germany and Ikechi Anya scored for Scotland. A foul from Charlie Mulgrew caused an injury to the left foot of Marco Reus. This foot is the same one that was injured and kept him from attending the World Cup. During stoppage time, Mulgrew was shown a second yellow card and sent off. After the first round of matches, Germany and Ireland were tied for second place in the group. Germany suffered their first competitive defeat since winning the World Cup on 11 October 2014 when Poland defeated Germany for the first time. The final score was 0–2. Germany were in third place after this matchday. A stoppage time goal from Ireland's John O'Shea cancelled out an earlier goal from Toni Kroos to cause Germany and Ireland to finish the match on 14 October 2014 tied 1–1. Germany remained in third place. On 14 November 2014 Germany defeated Gibraltar 4–0. Thomas Müller scored two goals before Mario Götze scored one goal to make the score 3–0 at half time. The final goal of the match was an own goal by Yogan Santos. After this matchday, Germany moved to second place in the group. The fifth matchday took place on 29 March 2015. Germany defeated Georgia 2–0 due to one goal each from Reus and Müller before half-time. After this round of matches, Germany were one point behind group leaders Poland.

===== UEFA Euro 2016 qualifying Group D table =====
Pos	Team	Pld	W	D	L	GF	GA	GD	Pts	Qualification	(Germany)	(Poland)	(Republic of Ireland)	(Scotland)	(Georgia (country))	(Gibraltar)
1	Germany	10	7	1	2	24	9	+15	22	Qualify for final tournament	—	3–1	1–1	2–1	2–1	4–0
2	Poland	10	6	3	1	33	10	+23	21	Qualify for final tournament	2–0	—	2–1	2–2	4–0	8–1
3	Republic of Ireland	10	5	3	2	19	7	+12	18	Advance to play-offs	1–0	1–1	—	1–1	1–0	7–0
4	Scotland	10	4	3	3	22	12	+10	15		2–3	2–2	1–0	—	1–0	6–1
5	Georgia	10	3	0	7	10	16	−6	9		0–2	0–4	1–2	1–0	—	4–0
6	Gibraltar	10	0	0	10	2	56	−54	0		0–7	0–7	0–4	0–6	0–3	—

Source: UEFA
Rules for classification: Qualification tiebreakers

===== UEFA Euro 2016 qualifying fixtures and results =====
Win Draw Loss

7 September 2014 UEFA Euro 2016 Q	Germany	2–1	Scotland	Dortmund, Germany
20:45 CEST (UTC+02:00)	Müller 18', 70'	Report	Anya 66'	Stadium: Signal Iduna Park; Attendance: 60,209; Referee: Svein Oddvar Moen (Norway)

11 October 2014 UEFA Euro 2016 Q	Poland	2–0	Germany	Warsaw, Poland
20:45 CEST (UTC+02:00)	Milik 51'; Mila 88'	Report		Stadium: National Stadium; Attendance: 56,934; Referee: Pedro Proença (Portugal)

14 October 2014 UEFA Euro 2016 Q	Germany	1–1	Republic of Ireland	Gelsenkirchen, Germany
20:45 CEST (UTC+02:00)	Kroos 71'	Report	O'Shea 90+4'	Stadium: Veltins-Arena; Attendance: 51,204; Referee: Damir Skomina (Slovenia)

14 November 2014 UEFA Euro 2016 Q	Germany	4–0	Gibraltar	Nuremberg, Germany
20:45 CET (UTC+01:00)	Müller 15', 29'; Götze 38'; Santos 68' (o.g.)	Report		Stadium: Grundig-Stadion; Attendance: 44,308; Referee: Alexandru Tudor (Romania)

29 March 2015 UEFA Euro 2016 Q	Georgia	0–2	Germany	Tbilisi, Georgia
20:00 GET (UTC+04:00)		Report	Reus 39'; Müller 44'	Stadium: Boris Paichadze Dinamo Arena; Attendance: 54,549; Referee: Clément Turpin (France)

13 June 2015 UEFA Euro 2016 Q	Gibraltar	0–7	Germany	Faro, Portugal
19:45 WEST (UTC+01:00)		Report	Schürrle 28', 65', 71'; Kruse 47', 81'; Gündoğan 51'; Bellarabi 57'	Stadium: Estádio Algarve; Attendance: 54,549; Referee: Clayton Pisani (Malta)

==== Friendly matches ====
Win Draw Loss

3 September 2014 Friendly	Germany	2–4	Argentina	Düsseldorf, Germany
20:45 CEST (UTC+02:00)	Schürrle 52'; Götze 78'	Report	Agüero 21'; Lamela 40'; Fernández 47'; di María 50'	Stadium: Esprit Arena; Attendance: 51,132; Referee: Björn Kuipers (Netherlands)

18 November 2014 Friendly	Spain	0–1	Germany	Vigo, Spain
20:45 CET (UTC+01:00)		Report	Kroos 89'	Stadium: Balaídos; Attendance: 22,000; Referee: Stefan Johannesson (Sweden)

25 March 2015 Friendly	Germany	2–2	Australia	Kaiserslautern, Germany
20:30 CET (UTC+01:00)	Reus 17'; Podolski 81'	Report	Troisi 40'; Jedinak 50'	Stadium: Fritz-Walter-Stadion; Attendance: 46,000; Referee: Michael Oliver (England)

10 June 2015 Friendly	Germany	1–2	United States	Cologne, Germany
20:45 CEST (UTC+02:00)	Götze 12'	Report	Diskerud 41'; Wood 87'	Stadium: RheinEnergieStadion; Attendance: 40,348; Referee: Danny Makkelie (Netherlands)

=== Germany women's national football team ===
==== 2015 FIFA Women's World Cup qualification ====
Pos	Team	Pld	W	D	L	GF	GA	GD	Pts	Qualification
1	Germany	10	10	0	0	62	4	+58	30	Women's World Cup
2	Russia	10	7	1	2	19	18	+1	22	
3	Republic of Ireland	10	5	2	3	13	9	+4	17	
4	Croatia	10	2	2	6	7	20	−13	8	
5	Slovenia	10	2	0	8	7	34	−27	6	
6	Slovakia	10	1	1	8	6	29	−23	4	

Source: UEFA
Rules for classification: Tiebreakers

Win Draw Loss

13 September 2014 2015 FIFA Women's World Cup Q	Russia	1–4	Germany	Moscow, Russia
15:45 MSK (UTC+03:00)	Tsybutovich 9' (pen.)	Report	Laudehr 6'; Šašić 19', 28', 72'	Stadium: Luzhniki Stadium; Attendance: 2,000; Referee: Pernilla Larsson (Sweden)

17 September 2014 2015 FIFA Women's World Cup Q	Germany	2–0	Republic of Ireland	Heidenheim, Germany
18:00 CEST (UTC+02:00)	Behringer 28'; Mittag 34'	Report		Stadium: Voith-Arena; Attendance: 7,028; Referee: Kateryna Monsul (Ukraine)

==== 2015 FIFA Women's World Cup ====
The draw for the 2015 FIFA Women's World Cup was held on 6 December 2014. Germany were placed in Group B along with Ivory Coast, Norway, and Thailand.

Pos	Team	Pld	W	D	L	GF	GA	GD	Pts	Qualification
1	Germany	3	2	1	0	15	1	+14	7	Advance to knockout stage
2	Norway	3	2	1	0	8	2	+6	7	Advance to knockout stage
3	Thailand	3	1	0	2	3	10	−7	3	
4	Ivory Coast	3	0	0	3	3	16	−13	0	

Source: FIFA
Rules for classification: Group stage tiebreakers

Win Draw Loss

7 June 2015 Group B	Germany	10–0	Ivory Coast	Ottawa, Canada
16:00 EDT (UTC-04:00)	Šašić 3', 14', 31'; Mittag 29', 35', 64'; Laudehr 71'; Däbritz 75'; Behringer 79'; Popp 85'	Report		Stadium: Lansdowne Stadium; Attendance: 20,953; Referee: Carol Chenard (Canada)

11 June 2015 Group B	Germany	1–1	Norway	Ottawa, Canada
16:00 EDT (UTC-04:00)	Mittag 6'	Report	Mjelde 61'	Stadium: Lansdowne Stadium; Attendance: 17,000; Referee: Teodora Albon (Romania)

15 June 2015 Group B	Thailand	0–4	Germany	Winnipeg, Canada
15:00 CDT (UTC-05:00)		Report	Leupolz 24'; Petermann 56', 58'; Däbritz 73'	Stadium: Winnipeg Stadium; Attendance: 26,191; Referee: Gladys Lengwe (Zambia)

20 June 2015 Round of 16	Germany	4–1	Sweden	Ottawa, Canada
16:00 EDT (UTC-04:00)	Mittag 24'; Šašić 36' (pen.), 78'; Marozsán 88'	Report	Sembrant 82'	Stadium: Lansdowne Stadium; Attendance: 22,486; Referee: Ri Hyang-Ok (North Korea)

26 June 2015 Quarter-final	Germany	1–1 (a.e.t.) (5–4 p)	France	Montreal, Canada
16:00 EDT (UTC-04:00)	Šašić 84' (pen.)	Report	Nécib 64'	Stadium: Olympic Stadium; Attendance: 24,859; Referee: Carol Chenard (Canada)
	Penalties
	Behringer (penalty scored); Laudehr (penalty scored); Peter (penalty scored); Marozsán (penalty scored); Šašić (penalty scored)		(penalty scored) Thiney; (penalty scored) Abily; (penalty scored) Nécib; (penalty scored) Renard; (penalty missed) Lavogez

30 June 2015 Semi-final	United States	2–0	Germany	Montreal, Canada
19:00 EDT (UTC-04:00)	Lloyd 69' (pen.); O'Hara 84'	Report		Stadium: Olympic Stadium; Attendance: 51,176; Referee: Teodora Albon (Romania)

4 July 2015 Match for 3rd	Germany	0–1 (a.e.t.)	England	Edmonton, Canada
15:00 CDT (UTC-05:00)		Report	Williams 108' (pen.)	Stadium: Commonwealth Stadium; Attendance: 21,483; Referee: Ri Hyang-Ok (North Korea)

==== 2015 Algarve Cup ====
On 18 December 2014 it was announced that Germany were placed in Group A along with Brazil, China, and Sweden.

Team	Pld	W	D	L	GF	GA	GD	Pts
Sweden	3	2	0	1	7	4	+3	6
Germany	3	2	0	1	7	5	+2	6
Brazil	3	1	1	1	3	3	0	4
China	3	0	1	2	0	5	−5	1

===== Ranking of teams for placement matches =====
Pos	Grp	Team	Pld	W	D	L	GF	GA	GD	Pts	Qualification
1	A	Germany	3	2	0	1	7	5	+2	6	Third-place match
2	B	Norway	3	1	1	1	4	4	0	4	Fifth-place match
3	C	Denmark	3	1	1	1	5	7	−2	4	Fifth-place match

Win Draw Loss

4 March 2015 Group A	Germany	2–4	Sweden	Vila Real de Santo António, Portugal
16:00 WET (UTC±00:00)	Marozsán 2'; Laudehr 3'	Report	Seger 30', 71'; Jakobsson 54', 84'	Stadium: Estádio Municipal; Attendance: 769; Referee: Carina Vitulano (Italy)

6 March 2015 Group A	Germany	2–0	China	Vila Real de Santo António, Portugal
13:00 WET (UTC±00:00)	Mittag 40'; Popp 76'	Report		Stadium: Estádio Municipal; Attendance: 502; Referee: Lucila Venegas (Mexico)

9 March 2015 Group A	Brazil	1–3	Germany	Parchal, Portugal
17:30 WET (UTC±00:00)	Bruna 47'	Report	Popp 39'; Šašić 48'; Marozsán 56'	Stadium: Stadium Bela Vista; Referee: Melissa Borjas (Honduras)

11 March 2015 Match for 3rd	Sweden	1–2	Germany	Parchal, Portugal
12:00 WET (UTC±00:00)	Jakobsson 64'	Report	Mittag 3'; Popp 52'	Stadium: Stadium Bela Vista; Attendance: 813; Referee: Liang Qin (China)

==== Friendly matches ====
Win Draw Loss

25 October 2014 Friendly	Germany	0–2	France	Offenbach, Germany
14:00 CEST (UTC+02:00)		Report	Schmidt 17' (o.g.); Thomis 20'	Stadium: Sparda-Bank-Hessen-Stadion; Attendance: 5,317; Referee: Jenny Palmqvist (Sweden)

29 October 2014 Friendly	Sweden	1–2	Germany	Örebro, Sweden
18:00 CET (UTC+01:00)	Schelin 68'	Report	Marozsán 76'; Popp 79'	Stadium: Behrn Arena; Attendance: 6,823; Referee: Marte Sørø (Norway)

23 November 2014 Friendly	England	0–3	Germany	London, England
15:00 WET (UTC±00:00)		Report	Scott 6' (o.g.); Šašić 12', 45'	Stadium: Wembley Stadium; Attendance: 45,619; Referee: Esther Staubli (Switzerland)

8 April 2015 Friendly	Germany	4–0	Brazil	Fürth, Germany
18:00 CEST (UTC+01:00)	Šašić 26' (pen.); Laudehr 35'; Leupolz 60'; Marozsán 86'	Report		Stadium: Stadion am Laubenweg; Attendance: 15,043; Referee: Riem Hussein (Germany)

== League season ==
=== Men ===
==== Bundesliga ====
The Bundesliga kicked off its season on 22 August 2014 with a match between Bayern Munich and VfL Wolfsburg.

Pos	Team	Pld	W	D	L	GF	GA	GD	Pts	Qualification or relegation
1	Bayern Munich (C)	34	25	4	5	80	18	+62	79	Qualification for the Champions League group stage
2	VfL Wolfsburg	34	20	9	5	72	38	+34	69	Qualification for the Champions League group stage
3	Borussia Mönchengladbach	34	19	9	6	53	26	+27	66	Qualification for the Champions League group stage
4	Bayer Leverkusen	34	17	10	7	62	37	+25	61	Qualification for the Champions League play-off round
5	FC Augsburg	34	15	4	15	43	43	0	49	Qualification for the Europa League group stage (Note: Since the winners of the 2014–15 DFB-Pokal, VfL Wolfsburg, qualified for the Champions League based on league position, the Europa League group stage spot was passed to the sixth-placed team, Schalke 04; and the Europa League third qualifying round spot was passed to the seventh-placed team, Borussia Dortmund.)
6	Schalke 04	34	13	9	12	42	40	+2	48	Qualification for the Europa League group stage
7	Borussia Dortmund	34	13	7	14	47	42	+5	46	Qualification for the Europa League third qualifying round
8	1899 Hoffenheim	34	12	8	14	49	55	−6	44	
9	Eintracht Frankfurt	34	11	10	13	56	62	−6	43	
10	Werder Bremen	34	11	10	13	50	65	−15	43	
11	Mainz 05	34	9	13	12	45	47	−2	40	
12	1. FC Köln	34	9	13	12	34	40	−6	40	
13	Hannover 96	34	9	10	15	40	56	−16	37	
14	VfB Stuttgart	34	9	9	16	42	60	−18	36	
15	Hertha BSC	34	9	8	17	36	52	−16	35	
16	Hamburger SV (O)	34	9	8	17	25	50	−25	35	Qualification for the relegation play-offs
17	SC Freiburg (R)	34	7	13	14	36	47	−11	34	Relegation to 2. Bundesliga
18	SC Paderborn (R)	34	7	10	17	31	65	−34	31	Relegation to 2. Bundesliga

Source: DFB
Rules for classification: 1) points; 2) goal difference; 3) number of goals scored
(C) Champions; (O) Play-off winners; (R) Relegated

==== 2. Bundesliga ====
The 2. Bundesliga kicked off its season on 1 August 2014.

Pos	Team	Pld	W	D	L	GF	GA	GD	Pts	Promotion, qualification or relegation
1	FC Ingolstadt (C, P)	34	17	13	4	53	32	+21	64	Promotion to Bundesliga
2	Darmstadt 98 (P)	34	15	14	5	44	26	+18	59	Promotion to Bundesliga
3	Karlsruher SC	34	15	13	6	46	26	+20	58	Qualification for promotion play-offs
4	1. FC Kaiserslautern	34	14	14	6	45	31	+14	56	
5	RB Leipzig	34	13	11	10	39	31	+8	50	
6	Eintracht Braunschweig	34	15	5	14	44	41	+3	50	
7	Union Berlin	34	12	11	11	46	51	−5	47	
8	1. FC Heidenheim	34	12	10	12	49	44	+5	46	
9	1. FC Nürnberg	34	13	6	15	42	47	−5	45	
10	Fortuna Düsseldorf	34	11	11	12	48	52	−4	44	
11	VfL Bochum	34	9	15	10	53	55	−2	42	
12	SV Sandhausen	34	10	12	12	32	37	−5	39 (Note: SV Sandhausen were deducted three points for license violation.)	
13	FSV Frankfurt	34	10	9	15	41	53	−12	39	
14	Greuther Fürth	34	8	13	13	34	42	−8	37	
15	FC St. Pauli	34	10	7	17	40	51	−11	37	
16	1860 Munich (O)	34	9	9	16	41	51	−10	36	Qualification for relegation play-offs
17	Erzgebirge Aue (R)	34	9	9	16	32	47	−15	36	Relegation to 3. Liga
18	VfR Aalen (R)	34	7	12	15	34	46	−12	31 (Note: VfR Aalen were deducted two points for license violation.)	Relegation to 3. Liga

Source: DFB
Rules for classification: 1) Points; 2) Goal difference; 3) Goals scored
(C) Champions; (O) Play-off winners; (P) Promoted; (R) Relegated

==== 3. Liga ====
The 3. Liga season kicked off on 26 July 2014.

Pos	Team	Pld	W	D	L	GF	GA	GD	Pts	Promotion, qualification or relegation
1	Arminia Bielefeld (C, P)	38	22	8	8	75	41	+34	74	Promotion to 2. Bundesliga and qualification for DFB-Pokal
2	MSV Duisburg (P)	38	20	11	7	63	40	+23	71	Promotion to 2. Bundesliga and qualification for DFB-Pokal
3	Holstein Kiel	38	18	13	7	53	30	+23	67	Qualification for promotion play-offs and DFB-Pokal
4	Stuttgarter Kickers	38	18	11	9	61	47	+14	65	Qualification for DFB-Pokal
5	Chemnitzer FC	38	17	8	13	44	36	+8	59	
6	Dynamo Dresden	38	16	8	14	52	48	+4	56	
7	Energie Cottbus	38	15	11	12	50	50	0	56	
8	Preußen Münster	38	15	9	14	53	49	+4	54	
9	SV Wehen Wiesbaden	38	15	8	15	54	44	+10	53	
10	Hallescher FC	38	15	8	15	51	53	−2	53	
11	VfL Osnabrück	38	14	10	14	49	51	−2	52	
12	Rot-Weiß Erfurt	38	14	9	15	47	54	−7	51	
13	VfB Stuttgart II (Note: Reserve teams are ineligible for promotion or DFB-Pokal qualification.)	38	13	8	17	48	57	−9	47	
14	Fortuna Köln	38	12	10	16	38	47	−9	46	
15	Sonnenhof Großaspach	38	12	10	16	39	60	−21	46	
16	Mainz 05 II	38	10	12	16	43	52	−9	42	
17	Hansa Rostock	38	11	8	19	54	68	−14	41	
18	Borussia Dortmund II (R)	38	8	15	15	41	51	−10	39	Relegation to Regionalliga
19	SpVgg Unterhaching (Note: SpVgg Unterhaching were deducted two points for license violation.) (R)	38	11	8	19	51	67	−16	39	Relegation to Regionalliga
20	Jahn Regensburg (R)	38	8	7	23	44	65	−21	31	Relegation to Regionalliga

Source: DFB
Rules for classification: 1) Points; 2) Goal difference; 3) Goals scored
(C) Champions; (P) Promoted; (R) Relegated

== German clubs in Europe ==
=== UEFA Champions League ===
==== Bayer Leverkusen ====
Bayer Leverkusen qualified for the play-off round of the Champions League by finishing in fourth place in the 2013–14 Bundesliga. The draw for the play-off round was held on 8 August 2014. Bayer Leverkusen were paired with F.C. Copenhagen. The first leg was played on 19 August 2014 at Telia Parken in Copenhagen. Bayer Leverkusen won the match 3–2. The second leg was played on 27 August 2014 at BayArena in Leverkusen. Bayer Leverkusen won the match 4–0 which resulted in an aggregate score of 7–2. The draw for the group stage was on 28 August 2014. Leverkusen were drawn into Group C. The first group stage match wias played on 16 September 2014 against Monaco at Stade Louis II. Leverkusen lost the match 0–1. After this matchday, Leverkusen were in third place in Group C. The second group stage match was against Benfica on 1 October 2014 at BayArena in Leverkusen. Bayer Leverkusen won the match 3–1. Leverkusen were in third place in Group C after the second matchday. Leverkusen played Zenit Saint Petersburg on 22 October 2014 at BayArena. Despite being reduced to ten men in the 79th minute, Leverkusen won the match 2–0. Leverkusen moved into first place in the group after this round of matches. Zenit and Leverkusen played on 4 November 2014 at Petrovsky Stadium. Leverkusen won this match 2–1. They remained in first place after this matchday. Bayer Leverkusen lost to Monaco 0–1 on 26 November 2014 at BayArena. After this matchday, Bayer Leverkusen's group lead shrank to one point. A goalless draw on 9 December 2014 at Estádio da Luz resulted in Bayer Leverkusen finishing in second place in the group stage. The draw for the round of 16 was on 15 December 2014. Bayer Leverkusen were drawn against Atlético Madrid. The first leg was won by Bayer Leverkusen on 25 February 2015 by the score 1–0. After Atletico won the second leg 1–0 on 17 March 2015, the aggregate score was tied 1–1. After thirty minutes of extra time were played, the aggregate score remained tied. During the penalty shootout, Ateltico made three successful kicks while Bayer Leverkusen were successful only twice and were thus eliminated from the competition.

==== Bayern Munich ====
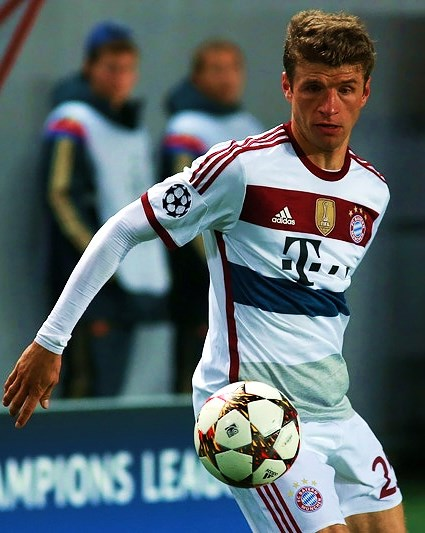
Thomas Müller playing against CSKA Moscow

As champions of the 2013–14 Bundesliga, Bayern Munich qualified for the group stage of the Champions League. The draw for the group stage took place on 28 August 2014. Bayern were drawn into Group E. Their first group stage match was played on 17 September 2014 against Manchester City at the Allianz Arena. Bayern won the match 1–0. After this matchday, Bayern were in second place in Group E. Their second group game was played on 30 September 2014 against CSKA Moscow. Bayern won the match 1–0. The match was played in an empty Arena Khimki. After this matchday, Bayern were in first place in Group E. The third match of the group stage was against Roma on 21 October 2014. Bayern won the match 7–1. They were still in first place after this matchday. The two teams met again on 5 November 2014. Bayern won the match 2–0. This victory secured first place in the group for Bayern with two matches remaining. The only defeat of the group stage came on 25 November 2014 at Etihad Stadium. Manchester City won the match 3–2. The final match of the group stage was played on 10 December 2014 at Allianz Arena. Bayern defeated CSKA 3–0. The draw for the round of 16 was on 15 December 2014 and resulted in Bayern Munich being paired with Shakhtar Donetsk. The first leg ended goalless on 17 February 2015. The match was played in Lviv instead of Donetsk due to unrest in Ukraine. Xabi Alonso, who made his 100th appearance in the competition, was sent off in the 66th minute. Bayern won the second leg on 11 March 2015. The final score, as well as aggregate score was 7–0.

==== Borussia Dortmund ====
As runners-up of the 2013–14 Bundesliga, Borussia Dortmund qualified for the group stage of the Champions League. The draw for the group stage took place on 28 August 2014. Dortmund were drawn into Group D. Their first match of the group stage was played on 16 September 2014 against Arsenal at Westfalenstadion in Dortmund. Borussia Dortmund won the match 2–0. Dortmund were in first place in Group D after this matchday. The second group stage match was played on 1 October 2014 against Anderlecht at Constant Vanden Stock Stadium. Dortmund won the match 3–0. They were in first place in Group D after the second matchday. Dortmund defeated Galatasaray 4–0 on 22 October 2014. After this round, Dortmund remained in first place in Group D. Dortmund and Galatasaray met again on 4 November 2014. Dortmund won the match 4–1 and secured a place in the round of 16. Borussia Dortmund lost to Arsenal on 26 November 2014 by a score of 0–2. The last match of the group stage was played on 9 December 2014. The match finished as a 1–1 draw between Anderlecht and Dortmund. On 15 December 2014, Borussia Dortmund were drawn against Juventus for the round of 16. On 24 February 2015, Dortmund lost the first leg 2–1. Dortmund suffered another defeat in the second leg on 18 March 2015. This time the score was 3–0 in favor of Juventus. The aggregate score after both legs was 1–5 which eliminated Borussia Dortmund.

==== Schalke 04 ====
FC Schalke 04 finished in third place in the 2013–14 Bundesliga which qualified them for the group stage of the Champions League. At the group-stage draw on 28 August 2014, Schalke were drawn into Group G. Their first group stage match was on 17 September 2014 against Chelsea at Stamford Bridge. The match ended as a 1–1 draw. All four teams were tied for first place in Group G after this matchday. The second group stage match was played on 30 September 2014 against Maribor. This match also ended as a 1–1 draw. After the second matchday, Schalke were tied with Maribor for second place in Group G. Schalke defeated Sporting Lisbon on 21 October 2014 4–3. Schalke were now solely in second place. Schalke and Sporting Lisbon met again on 5 November 2014. Schalke lost the match 2–4. Even with the loss, Schalke remained in second place in the group Matchday 5 ended with a 0–5 loss to Chelsea on 25 November 2014. After this matchday, Schalke fell to third place in the group. A victory over Maribor by the score 1–0 on 10 December 2014 secured second place in the group and a place in the round of 16. The round of 16 draw on 15 December 2014 paired Schalke with defending champions Real Madrid. The first leg was played on 18 February 2015. Schalke lost the match 0–2. Schalke won the second leg on 10 March 2015 by the score 4–3. However, due to an aggregate score of 4–5, they were eliminated from the competition.

=== UEFA Europa League ===
==== Borussia Mönchengladbach ====
Borussia Mönchengladbach qualified for the play-off round of the Europa League by finishing in sixth place in the 2013–14 Bundesliga. The draw for the play-off round took place on 8 August 2014. Mönchengladbach were paired with FK Sarajevo. The first leg was played on 21 August 2014 at Asim Ferhatović Hase Stadium in Sarajevo, Bosnia and Herzegovina. Borussia Mönchengladbach won the match 3–2. The second leg was played on 28 August 2014. Gladbach won the match 7–0. The aggregate score of 10–2 allowed Gladbach to advance to the group stage. The draw for the group stage took place on 29 August 2014. Gladbach were placed in Group A. The first group stage match was against Villarreal on 18 September 2014 at Borussia-Park. The match ended as a 1–1 draw. Gladbach were tied for second place in Group A after this matchday. Their second group stage match was against Zürich at Letzigrund on 2 October 2014. The match ended as a 1–1 draw. After the matchday, Gladbach were in third place in Group A. Apollon Limassol played Gladbach on 23 October 2014 at Borussia-Park. Gladbach won the match 5–0 and moved to second place in the group. Gladbach and Apollon met again on 6 November 2014. Borussia Mönchengladbach won the match 2–0 to move to first place in the group. The match between Villarreal and Gladbach on 27 November 2014 ended as a 2–2 draw. Gladbach remained in first place after this matchday. The final match of the group stage was played on 11 December 2014. Gladbach defeated Zürich 3–0. This victory secured first place in the group. The draw for the round of 32 was on 15 December 2014. Borussia Mönchengladbach were paired with Sevilla. Gladbach lost the first leg 0–1 on 19 February 2015.

==== Mainz 05 ====
FSV Mainz 05 finished in seventh place in the 2013–14 Bundesliga and were qualified for the third qualifying round of the Europa League. The draw for the third qualifying round was held on 18 July 2014. Mainz were paired with Asteras Tripolis The first leg was played on 31 July 2014 at Coface Arena. Mainz won the match 1–0. The second leg was played at Theodoros Kolokotronis Stadium in Tripoli, Greece on 7 August 2014. Mainz lost the match 1–3. The aggregate score of 2–3 resulted in Mainz being eliminated from the competition.

==== VfL Wolfsburg ====
VfL Wolfsburg finished the 2013–14 Bundesliga in fifth place which earned them a berth in the group stage of the Europa League. The group-stage draw took place on 29 August 2014 and resulted in Wolfsburg being placed in Group H. Their first group stage match was against Everton on 18 September 2014 at Goodison Park. Wolfsburg lost the match 1–4. They were in last place in Group H after this matchday. The second group stage match was against Lille at the Volkswagen Arena on 2 October 2014. The match ended as a 1–1 draw. Wolfsburg were still at the bottom of the group after this matchday. FC Krasnodar played Wolfsburg on 23 October 2014 at Kuban Stadium. Wolfsburg won the match 4–2. Wolfsburg were in third place in the group after this matchday. Wolfsburg were again victorious when they defeated Krasnodar 5–1 on 6 November 2014. Wolfsburg remained in second place after this matchday. Everton defeated Wolfsburg 0–2 on 27 November 2014. Despite the defeat, Wolfsburg remained in second place in the group after this matchday. Wolfsburg defeated Lille 3–0 on 11 December 2014 to finish the group stage in second place. The draw for the round of 32 on 15 December 2014 paired Wolfsburg with Sporting Lisbon. The first leg was won by Wolfsburg 2–0 on 19 February 2015.

=== UEFA Women's Champions League ===
==== FFC Frankfurt ====
1. FFC Frankfurt finished as runners-up in the 2013–14 Bundesliga (women) and earned a berth in the Round of 32 of the Women's Champions League. On 22 August 2014, Frankfurt were drawn against BIIK Kazygurt for the round of 32. The first leg was played in Shymkent, Kazakhstan on 8 October 2014. The match ended as a 2–2 draw. The second leg was played on 16 October 2014. Frankfurt won the match 4–0. With an aggregate score of 6–2, Frankfurt advanced to the Round of 16 where they were paired with Torres. Frankfurt won the first leg against Torres on 9 November 2014 by the score 5–0. The second leg was played on 12 November 2014. Frankfurt won this match 4–0 which resulted in an aggregate score of 9–0. The draw for the quarter-finals resulted in Frankfurt facing Bristol Academy.

==== VfL Wolfsburg ====
VfL Wolfsburg (women) won both the 2013–14 UEFA Women's Champions League and 2013–14 Bundesliga (women). These championships qualified them for the Round of 32 of the Women's Champions League. Wolfsburg were drawn against Stabæk on 22 August 2014 for the round of 32. The first leg was played on 8 October 2014 at Nadderud Stadion in Bekkestua, Norway. Wolfsburg won the match 1–0. The second leg was played on 16 October 2014. Wolfsburg were victorious as the match ended 2–1. They advanced to the Round of 16 with an aggregate score of 3–1. They will play against SV Neulengbach in the Round of 16. The first leg was played on 9 November 2014. Wolfsburg won the match 4–0. The second leg was won by Wolfsburg 7–0 on 12 November 2014. The aggregate score for this round was 11–0. Wolfsburg was paired with FC Rosengård for the quarter-finals.

== Managerial changes ==
League	Team	Outgoing manager(s)	Date of vacancy	Position in table	Incoming manager(s)	Date of appointment	Ref.
3. Liga	Energie Cottbus	René Rydlewicz	11 May 2014	Pre-season	Stefan Krämer	11 May 2014	
2. Bundesliga	1. FC Union Berlin	Uwe Neuhaus	11 May 2014	Pre-season	Norbert Düwel	13 May 2014	
Bundesliga	1. FSV Mainz 05	Thomas Tuchel	11 May 2014	Pre-season	Kasper Hjulmand	15 May 2014	
3. Liga	Hansa Rostock	Dirk Lottner	11 May 2014	Pre-season	Peter Vollmann	13 May 2014	
3. Liga	Jahn Regensburg	Thomas Stratos	11 May 2014	Pre-season	Alexander Schmidt	13 May 2014	
3. Liga	Dynamo Dresden	Olaf Janßen	13 May 2014	Pre-season	Stefan Böger	23 May 2014	
3. Liga	MSV Duisburg	Karsten Baumann	31 May 2014	Pre-season	Gino Lettieri	15 June 2014	
2. Bundesliga	1860 Munich	Markus von Ahlen	4 June 2014	Pre-season	Ricardo Moniz	4 June 2014	
2. Bundesliga	1. FC Nürnberg	Roger Prinzen	5 June 2014	Pre-season	Valérien Ismaël	5 June 2014	
2. Bundesliga	Fortuna Düsseldorf	Lorenz-Günther Köstner	12 June 2014	Pre-season	Oliver Reck	13 June 2014	
Bundesliga	Eintracht Frankfurt	Armin Veh	30 June 2014	Pre-season	Thomas Schaaf	1 July 2014	
Bundesliga	Bayer Leverkusen	Sascha Lewandowski	30 June 2014	Pre-season	Roger Schmidt	1 July 2014	
Bundesliga	VfB Stuttgart	Huub Stevens	30 June 2014	Pre-season	Armin Veh	1 July 2014	
2. Bundesliga	Erzgebirge Aue	Falko Götz	2 September 2014	18th	Tomislav Stipić	9 September 2014	
2. Bundesliga	FC St. Pauli	Roland Vrabec	3 September 2014	14th	Thomas Meggle	3 September 2014	
Bundesliga	Hamburger SV	Mirko Slomka	15 September 2014	18th	Josef Zinnbauer	16 September 2014	
2. Bundesliga	1860 Munich	Ricardo Moniz	24 September 2014	13th	Markus von Ahlen	24 September 2014	
Bundesliga	FC Schalke 04	Jens Keller	7 October 2014	11th	Roberto Di Matteo	7 October 2014	
Bundesliga	SV Werder Bremen	Robin Dutt	25 October 2014	18th	Viktor Skrypnyk	25 October 2014	
3. Liga	SG Sonnenhof Großaspach	Rüdiger Rehm	28 October 2014	18th	Uwe Rapolder	28 October 2014	
3. Liga	Jahn Regensburg	Alexander Schmidt	10 November 2014	20th	Christian Brand	18 November 2014	
2. Bundesliga	1. FC Nürnberg	Valérien Ismaël	11 November 2014	14th	René Weiler	12 November 2014	
Bundesliga	VfB Stuttgart	Armin Veh	24 November 2014	18th	Huub Stevens	25 November 2014	
3. Liga	Hansa Rostock	Peter Vollmann	7 December 2014	19th	Karsten Baumann	9 December 2014	
2. Bundesliga	VfL Bochum	Peter Neururer	9 December 2014	10th	Frank Heinemann	9 December 2014	
2. Bundesliga	FC St. Pauli	Thomas Meggle	16 December 2014	18th	Ewald Lienen	16 December 2014	
2. Bundesliga	VfL Bochum	Frank Heinemann	31 December 2014	11th	Gertjan Verbeek	1 January 2015	
Bundesliga	Hertha BSC	Jos Luhukay	5 February 2015	17th			
2. Bundesliga	RB Leipzig	Alexander Zorniger	11 February 2015	7th	Achim Beierlorzer	11 February 2015	
3. Liga	Dynamo Dresden	Stefan Böger	16 February 2015	8th	Peter Nemeth	16 February 2015	
Bundesliga	1. FSV Mainz 05	Kasper Hjulmand	16 February 2015	14th	Martin Schmidt	17 February 2015	
3. Liga	Mainz II	Martin Schmidt	17 February 2015	17th	Sandro Schwarz	17 February 2015	
2. Bundesliga	1860 Munich	Markus von Ahlen	17 February 2015	16th	Torsten Fröhling	17 February 2015	
2. Bundesliga	SpVgg Greuther Fürth	Frank Kramer	23 February 2015	13th	Mike Büskens	23 February 2015	
2. Bundesliga	Fortuna Düsseldorf	Oliver Reck	23 February 2015	6th			
3. Liga	SG Sonnenhof Großaspach	Uwe Rapolder	25 February 2015	19th	Rüdiger Rehm	25 February 2015	

== Deaths ==
- July 2014 – Burkhardt Öller, 73, goalkeeper for Eintracht Braunschweig and Hannover 96.
- 3 July 2014 – Volkmar Groß, 66, goalkeeper for Hertha BSC, FC Schalke 04, and Tennis Borussia Berlin.
- 14 July 2014 – Horacio Troche, 79, defender for Alemannia Aachen and Bonner SC.
- 18 July 2014 – Andreas Biermann, 33, defender for Chemnitzer FC, FC St. Pauli, and 1. FC Union Berlin among others.
- 3 August 2014 – Helmut Faeder, 79, striker for Hertha BSC and Hertha Zehlendorf who earned one cap for West Germany.
- 11 August 2014 – Vladimir Beara, 85, former goalkeeper for FC Viktoria Köln who also managed Freiburger FC and Viktoria Köln.
- 13 August 2014 – Kurt Tschenscher, 85, a German referee who was the first referee to show a yellow card when he did so at the 1970 FIFA World Cup.
- 6 October 2014 – Feridun Buğeker, 81, forward for Stuttgarter Kickers
- 27 December 2014 – Erich Retter, 89, defender for VfB Stuttgart and West Germany.
- 10 January 2015 – Junior Malanda, 20, midfielder for VfL Wolfsburg
- 11 January 2015 – Fritz Pott, 75, defender for 1. FC Köln who earned three caps for West Germany.
- 1 February 2015 – Udo Lattek, 80, striker for VfL Osnabrück and others who also was manager for Bayern Munich and Borussia Mönchengladbach among others.
- 1 February 2015 – Julius Ludorf, 95, forward for SpVgg Erkenschwick.
- 9 February 2015 – Horst Borcherding, 84, goalkeeper for VfL Osnabrück and SV Saar 05 Saarbrücken who earned 3 caps for Saarland.
- 10 February 2015 – Manfred Wagner, 76, defender for TSV 1860 München.
