= Germany national football team results (2000–2019) =

This is a list of international games played by the Germany national team between 2000 and 2019.

== 2000s ==
=== 2000 ===
| 23 February Friendly | Netherlands | 2–1 | Germany | Amsterdam, Netherlands |
| 20:00 CET (UTC+01:00) | Kluivert 15'; Zenden 28' | Report | Ziege 22' | Stadium: Amsterdam Arena; Attendance: 50,000; Referee: Domenico Messina (Italy) |

| 29 March Friendly | Croatia | 1–1 | Germany | Zagreb, Croatia |
| 19:00 CEST (UTC+02:00) | N. Kovač 70' | Report | Rehmer 12' | Stadium: Stadion Maksimir; Attendance: 5,000; Referee: Ľuboš Micheľ (Slovakia) |

| 26 April Friendly | Germany | 1–1 | Switzerland | Kaiserslautern, Germany |
| 20:30 CEST (UTC+02:00) | Kirsten 85' | Report | Yakin 33' | Stadium: Fritz-Walter-Stadion; Attendance: 32,000; Referee: Morgan Norman (Sweden) |

| 3 June Friendly | Germany | 3–2 | Czech Republic | Nuremberg, Germany |
| 19:00 CEST (UTC+02:00) | Jancker 38'; Bierhoff 62' (pen.), 90' | Report | Kuka 54'; Berger 80' | Stadium: Frankenstadion; Attendance: 30,000; Referee: Alfredo Trentalange (Italy) |

| 7 June Friendly | Germany | 8–2 | Liechtenstein | Freiburg, Germany |
| 19:00 CEST (UTC+02:00) | Bierhoff 1'; Scholl 31'; Bode 65'; Hasler 80' (o.g.); Kirsten 81', 86'; Jancker 84', 88' | Report | Stocklasa 17'; Frick 56' | Stadium: Dreisamstadion; Attendance: 24,000; Referee: Konrad Plautz (Austria) |

| 12 June UEFA Euro 2000 Group A | Germany | 1–1 | Romania | Liège, Belgium |
| 18:00 CEST (UTC+02:00) | Scholl 28' | Report | Moldovan 5' | Stadium: Stade Maurice Dufrasne; Attendance: 28,500; Referee: Kim Milton Nielsen (Denmark) |

| 17 June UEFA Euro 2000 Group A | England | 1–0 | Germany | Charleroi, Belgium |
| 20:45 CEST (UTC+02:00) | Shearer 53' | Report | | Stadium: Stade du Pays de Charleroi; Attendance: 27,700; Referee: Pierluigi Collina (Italy) |

| 20 June UEFA Euro 2000 Group A | Portugal | 3–0 | Germany | Rotterdam, Netherlands |
| 20:45 CEST (UTC+02:00) | Conceição 35', 54', 71' | Report | | Stadium: Feijenoord Stadium; Attendance: 27,700; Referee: Dick Jol (Netherlands) |

| 16 August Friendly | Germany | 4–1 | Spain | Hanover, Germany |
| 20:30 CEST (UTC+02:00) | Scholl 24', 51'; Zickler 57', 62' | Report | Raúl 69' | Stadium: Niedersachsenstadion; Attendance: 45,000; Referee: Knud Erik Fisker (Denmark) |

| 2 September 2002 FIFA World Cup qualification Group 9 | Germany | 2–0 | Greece | Hamburg, Germany |
| 19:00 CEST (UTC+02:00) | Deisler 18'; Scholl 78' | Report | | Stadium: Volksparkstadion; Attendance: 48,500; Referee: Antonio Lopez Nieto (Spain) |

| 7 October 2002 FIFA World Cup qualification Group 9 | England | 0–1 | Germany | London, England |
| 15:00 | | Report | Hamann 14' | Stadium: Wembley Stadium; Attendance: 76,377; Referee: Stefano Braschi (Italy) |

| 15 November Friendly | Denmark | 2–1 | Germany | Copenhagen, Denmark |
| 19:15 | Rommedahl 56', 66' | Report | Scholl 84' | Stadium: Parken Stadium; Attendance: 17,664; Referee: Fritz Stuchlik (Austria) |

=== 2001 ===
| 27 February Friendly | France | 1–0 | Germany | Saint-Denis, France |
| 20:45 | Zidane 27' | Report | | Stadium: Stade de France; Attendance: 77,927; Referee: Alfredo Trentalange (Italy) |

| 24 March 2002 FIFA World Cup; Qualification Group 9 | Germany | 2–1 | Albania | Leverkusen, Germany |
| 20:00 | Deisler 49'; Klose 87' | Report | Kola 65' | Stadium: BayArena; Attendance: 22,500; Referee: Graziano Cesari (Italy) |

| 28 March 2002 FIFA World Cup; Qualification Group 9 | Greece | 2–4 | Germany | Athens, Greece |
| 21:30 | Charisteas 20'; Georgiadis 43' | Report | Rehmer 6'; Ballack 25' (pen.); Klose 82'; Bode 90' | Stadium: Olympic Stadium; Attendance: 32,173; Referee: Vítor Mela Pereira (Portugal) |

| 29 May Friendly | Germany | 2–0 | Slovakia | Bremen, Germany |
| 19:30 | Asamoah 50'; Baumann 56' | Report | | Stadium: Weserstadion; Attendance: 18,000; Referee: Claude Colombo (France) |

| 2 June 2002 FIFA World Cup; Qualification Group 9 | Finland | 2–2 | Germany | Helsinki, Finland |
| 20:00 | Forssell 28', 43' | Report | Ballack 69' (pen.); Jancker 73' | Stadium: Olympiastadion; Attendance: 35,744; Referee: Dick Jol (Netherlands) |

| 6 June 2002 FIFA World Cup; Qualification Group 9 | Albania | 0–2 | Germany | Tirana, Albania |
| 19:30 | | Report | Rehmer 27'; Ballack 68' | Stadium: Qemal Stafa; Attendance: 12,800; Referee: Gilles Veissiere (France) |

| 15 August Friendly | Hungary | 2–5 | Germany | Budapest, Hungary |
| 20:45 | Tököli 64'; Horváth 90' | Report | Böhme 31' (pen.); Kehl 44'; Jancker 46'; Baumann 59'; Bierhoff 90' | Stadium: Ferenc Puskás Stadium; Attendance: 28,000; Referee: Juan Ansuategi Roca (Spain) |

| 1 September 2002 FIFA World Cup; Qualification Group 9 | Germany | 1–5 | England | Munich, Germany |
| 19:30 | Jancker 6' | Report | Owen 12', 48', 65'; Steven Gerrard 45+3'; Heskey 73' | Stadium: Olympiastadion; Attendance: 63,000; Referee: Pierluigi Collina (Italy) |

| 6 October 2002 FIFA World Cup; Qualification Group 9 | Germany | 0–0 | Finland | Gelsenkirchen, Germany |
| 16:00 | | Report | | Stadium: Arena AufSchalke; Attendance: 52,000; Referee: Anders Frisk (Sweden) |

| 10 November 2002 FIFA World Cup; Qualification Play-off | Ukraine | 1–1 | Germany | Kyiv, Ukraine |
| 21:45 | Zubov 18' | Report | Ballack 31' | Stadium: Olimpiyskiy National Sports Complex; Attendance: 83,000; Referee: Stefano Braschi (Italy) |

| 14 November 2002 FIFA World Cup; Qualification Play-off | Germany | 4–1 | Ukraine | Dortmund, Germany |
| 20:45 | Ballack 4', 51'; Neuville 11'; Rehmer 15' | Report | Shevchenko 90' | Stadium: Westfalenstadion; Attendance: 52,400; Referee: Vítor Melo Pereira (Portugal) |

=== 2002 ===
| 13 February Friendly | Germany | 7–1 | Israel | Kaiserslautern, Germany |
| 20:30 | Klose 49', 51', 64'; Hamann 62'; Bierhoff 69'; Asamoah 74'; Ricken 77' | Report | Kahn 27' (o.g.) | Stadium: Fritz-Walter-Stadion; Attendance: 24,512; Referee: Steve Dunn (England) |

| 27 March Friendly | Germany | 4–2 | United States | Rostock, Germany |
| 20:45 | Ziege 44'; Neuville 61'; Bierhoff 65'; Frings 68' | Report | Mathis 17', 71' | Stadium: Ostseestadion; Attendance: 28,835; Referee: Bernhard Brugger (Austria) |

| 17 April Friendly | Germany | 0–1 | Argentina | Stuttgart, Germany |
| 20:45 | | Report | Sorín 48' | Stadium: Gottlieb-Daimler-Stadion; Attendance: 54,570; Referee: Manuel Mejuto González (Spain) |

| 9 May Friendly | Germany | 7–0 | Kuwait | Freiburg, Germany |
| 20:30 | Frings 10'; Bierhoff 24', 43', 72' (pen.); Deisler 40'; Kehl 44'; Jancker 77' | Report | | Stadium: Dreisamstadion; Attendance: 22,000; Referee: Karl-Erik Nilsson (Sweden) |

| 14 May Friendly | Wales | 1–0 | Germany | Cardiff, Wales |
| 20:45 | Earnshaw 46' | Report | | Stadium: Millennium Stadium; Attendance: 36,920; Referee: Roy Olsen (Norway) |

| 18 May Friendly | Germany | 6–2 | Austria | Leverkusen, Germany |
| 19:00 | Klose 15', 29', 53'; Bode 36', 68'; Bierofka 81' | Report | Aufhauser 37'; Wallner 46' | Stadium: BayArena; Attendance: 21,500; Referee: Massimo Busacca (Switzerland) |

| 1 June 2002 FIFA World Cup; Group E | Germany | 8–0 | Saudi Arabia | Sapporo, Japan |
| 20:30 | Klose 20', 25', 70'; Ballack 40'; Jancker 45+1'; Linke 73'; Bierhoff 84'; Schneider 90+1' | Report | | Stadium: Sapporo Dome; Attendance: 32,218; Referee: Ubaldo Aquino (Paraguay) |

| 5 June 2002 FIFA World Cup; Group E | Germany | 1–1 | Republic of Ireland | Ibaraki, Japan |
| 20:30 | Klose 19' | Report | Robbie Keane 90+2' | Stadium: Kashima Soccer Stadium; Attendance: 35,854; Referee: Kim Milton Nielsen (Denmark) |

| 11 June 2002 FIFA World Cup; Group E | Cameroon | 0–2 | Germany | Shizuoka, Japan |
| 20:30 | | Report | Bode 50'; Klose 79' | Stadium: Ecopa Stadium; Attendance: 47,085; Referee: Antonio López Nieto (Spain) |

| 15 June 2002 FIFA World Cup; Round of 16 | Germany | 1–0 | Paraguay | Seogwipo, South Korea |
| 15:30 | Neuville 88' | Report | | Stadium: Jeju World Cup Stadium; Attendance: 25,176; Referee: Carlos Alberto Batres (Guatemala) |

| 21 June 2002 FIFA World Cup; Quarter Final | Germany | 1–0 | United States | Ulsan, South Korea |
| 20:30 | Ballack 39' | Report | | Stadium: Munsu Cup Stadium; Attendance: 37,337; Referee: Hugh Dallas (Scotland) |

| 25 June 2002 FIFA World Cup; Semi Final | Germany | 1–0 | South Korea | Seoul, South Korea |
| 20:30 | Ballack 75' | Report | | Stadium: Seoul World Cup Stadium; Attendance: 65,256; Referee: Urs Meier (Switzerland) |

| 30 June 2002 FIFA World Cup; Final | Germany | 0–2 | Brazil | Yokohama, Japan |
| 20:30 | | Report | Ronaldo 67', 79' | Stadium: International Stadium; Attendance: 69,029; Referee: Pierluigi Collina (Italy) |

| 21 August Friendly | Bulgaria | 2–2 | Germany | Sofia, Bulgaria |
| 19:45 | Berbatov 22'; Balakov 50' (pen.) | Report | Ballack 24' (pen.); Jancker 57' | Stadium: Vasil Levski National Stadium; Attendance: 10,000; Referee: Stéphane Bré (France) |

| 7 September UEFA Euro 2004; Qualifying Group 5 | Lithuania | 0–2 | Germany | Kaunas, Lithuania |
| 19:30 | | Report | Ballack 27'; Stankevičius 59' (o.g.) | Stadium: S. Darius and S. Girėnas Stadium; Attendance: 8,500; Referee: Graham Poll (England) |

| 11 October Friendly | Bosnia and Herzegovina | 1–1 | Germany | Sarajevo, Bosnia and Herzegovina |
| 20:30 | Baljić 21' | Report | Jancker 56' | Stadium: Asim Ferhatović Hase Stadium; Attendance: 5,000; Referee: Massimo De Santis (Italy) |

| 16 October UEFA Euro 2004; Qualifying Group 5 | Germany | 2–1 | Faroe Islands | Hanover, Germany |
| 20:30 | Ballack 2' (pen.); Klose 59' | Report | Friedrich 45' (o.g.) | Stadium: AWD-Arena; Attendance: 36,628; Referee: Dani Koren (Israel) |

| 20 November Friendly | Germany | 1–3 | Netherlands | Gelsenkirchen, Germany |
| 20:00 | Bobic 34' | Report | Kluivert 22'; Hasselbaink 69'; Van Nistelrooy 79' | Stadium: Arena AufSchalke; Attendance: 60,601; Referee: Hugh Dallas (Scotland) |

=== 2003 ===
| 12 February Friendly | Spain | 3–1 | Germany | Palma, Spain |
| 21:30 | Raúl 31', 76' (pen.); Guti 82' | Report | Bobic 38' | Stadium: Iberostar Stadium; Attendance: 20,000; Referee: Mike Riley (England) |

| 29 March UEFA Euro 2004; Qualifying Group 5 | Germany | 1–1 | Lithuania | Nuremberg, Germany |
| 19:00 | Ramelow 7' | Report | Ražanauskas 72' | Stadium: Frankenstadion; Attendance: 40,754; Referee: Victor José Esquinas Torres (Spain) |

| 30 April Friendly | Germany | 1–0 | Serbia and Montenegro | Bremen, Germany |
| 20:40 | Kehl 60' | Report | | Stadium: Weserstadion; Attendance: 26,000; Referee: Frank De Bleeckere (Belgium) |

| 1 June Friendly | Germany | 4–1 | Canada | Wolfsburg, Germany |
| 19:00 | Ramelow 41'; Freier 52'; Bobic 61'; Rau 90' | Report | McKenna 20' | Stadium: Volkswagen Arena; Attendance: 23,000; Referee: Éric Poulat (France) |

| 7 June UEFA Euro 2004; Qualifying Group 5 | Scotland | 1–1 | Germany | Glasgow, Scotland |
| 16:00 | Miller 69' | Report | Bobic 22' | Stadium: Hampden Park; Attendance: 48,047; Referee: Domenico Messina (Italy) |

| 11 June UEFA Euro 2004; Qualifying Group 5 | Faroe Islands | 0–2 | Germany | Tórshavn, Faroe Islands |
| 20:45 | | Report | Klose 89'; Bobic 90+2' | Stadium: Tórsvøllur; Attendance: 6,500; Referee: Jan Wegereef (Netherlands) |

| 20 August Friendly | Germany | 0–1 | Italy | Stuttgart, Germany |
| 20:45 | | Report | Vieri 18' | Stadium: Gottlieb-Daimler-Stadion; Attendance: 49,000; Referee: Kim Milton Nielsen (Denmark) |

| 6 September UEFA Euro 2004; Qualifying Group 5 | Iceland | 0–0 | Germany | Reykjavík, Iceland |
| 19:30 | | Report | | Stadium: Laugardalsvöllur; Attendance: 7,000; Referee: Graham Barber (England) |

| 10 September UEFA Euro 2004; Qualifying Group 5 | Germany | 2–1 | Scotland | Dortmund, Germany |
| 20:45 | Bobic 26'; Ballack 50' (pen.) | Report | McCann 60' | Stadium: Westfalenstadion; Attendance: 67,000; Referee: Anders Frisk (Sweden) |

| 11 October UEFA Euro 2004; Qualifying Group 5 | Germany | 3–0 | Iceland | Hamburg, Germany |
| 17:00 | Ballack 9'; Bobic 59'; Kurányi 79' | Report | | Stadium: AOL Arena; Attendance: 50,780; Referee: Valentin Ivanov (Russia) |

| 15 November Friendly | Germany | 0–3 | France | Gelsenkirchen, Germany |
| 20:30 | | Report | Henry 21'; Trezeguet 54', 81' | Stadium: Arena AufSchalke; Attendance: 53,574; Referee: Stefano Farina (Italy) |

=== 2004 ===
| 18 February Friendly | Croatia | 1–2 | Germany | Split, Croatia |
| 20:45 | Neretljak 86' | Report | Klose 34'; Ramelow 90' | Stadium: Stadion Poljud; Attendance: 15,000; Referee: Peter Fröjdfeldt (Sweden) |

| 31 March Friendly | Germany | 3–0 | Belgium | Cologne, Germany |
| 20:30 | Kurányi 45'; Hamann 55'; Ballack 81' | Report | | Stadium: RheinEnergieStadion; Attendance: 46,500; Referee: Jan Wegereef (Netherlands) |

| 28 April Friendly | Romania | 5–1 | Germany | Bucharest, Romania |
| 19:00 | Pleșan 21'; Raț 23'; Dănciulescu 34', 42'; Caramarin 84' | Report | Lahm 87' | Stadium: Stadionul Giulești-Valentin Stănescu; Attendance: 10,000; Referee: Roberto Rosetti (Italy) |

| 27 May Friendly | Germany | 7–0 | Malta | Freiburg, Germany |
| 20:30 | Ballack 15', 17', 58', 86'; Nowotny 32'; Frings 41'; Bobic 90' | Report | | Stadium: Dreisamstadion; Attendance: 20,000; Referee: Anton Stredak (Slovakia) |

| 2 June Friendly | Switzerland | 0–2 | Germany | Basel, Switzerland |
| 20:45 | | Report | Kurányi 62', 84' | Stadium: St. Jakob-Park; Attendance: 30,000; Referee: Domenico Messina (Italy) |

| 6 June Friendly | Germany | 0–2 | Hungary | Kaiserslautern, Germany |
| 19:00 | | Report | Torghelle 6', 31' | Stadium: Fritz-Walter-Stadion; Attendance: 36,590; Referee: Steve Bennett (England) |

| 15 June UEFA Euro 2004; Group D | Germany | 1–1 | Netherlands | Porto, Portugal |
| 20:45 | Frings 30' | Report | Van Nistelrooy 81' | Stadium: Estádio do Dragão; Attendance: 48,197; Referee: Anders Frisk (Sweden) |

| 19 June UEFA Euro 2004; Group D | Latvia | 0–0 | Germany | Porto, Portugal |
| 18:00 | | Report | | Stadium: Estádio do Bessa; Attendance: 22,344; Referee: Mike Riley (England) |

| 23 June UEFA Euro 2004; Group D | Germany | 1–2 | Czech Republic | Lisbon, Portugal |
| 20:45 | Ballack 21' | Report | Heinz 30'; Baroš 77' | Stadium: Estádio José Alvalade; Attendance: 46,849; Referee: Terje Hauge (Norway) |

| 18 August Friendly | Austria | 1–3 | Germany | Vienna, Austria |
| 20:45 | Amerhauser 10' | Report | Kurányi 2', 61', 73' | Stadium: Ernst-Happel-Stadion; Attendance: 38,000; Referee: Pierluigi Collina (Italy) |

| 8 September Friendly | Germany | 1–1 | Brazil | Berlin, Germany |
| 20:45 | Kurányi 17' | Report | Ronaldinho 9' | Stadium: Olympiastadion; Attendance: 74,315; Referee: Urs Meier (Switzerland) |

| 9 October Friendly | Iran | 0–2 | Germany | Tehran, Iran |
| 18:00 | | Report | Ernst 5'; Brdarić 53' | Stadium: Azadi Stadium; Attendance: 110,000; Referee: Saad Kamil Al-Fadhli (Kuwait) |

| 17 November Friendly | Germany | 3–0 | Cameroon | Leipzig, Germany |
| 20:40 | Kurányi 72'; Klose 78', 89' | Report | | Stadium: Zentralstadion; Attendance: 44,200; Referee: Massimo De Santis (Italy) |

| 16 December Friendly | Japan | 0–3 | Germany | Yokohama, Japan |
| 12:10 | | Report | Klose 54', 90'; Ballack 70' | Stadium: Nissan Stadium; Attendance: 61,805; Referee: Mark Shield (Australia) |

| 19 December Friendly | South Korea | 3–1 | Germany | Busan, South Korea |
| 11:00 | Kim Dong-jin 16'; Lee Dong-gook 71'; Cho Jae-jin 87' | Report | Ballack 25' | Stadium: Busan Asiad Main Stadium; Attendance: 45,775; Referee: Subkhiddin Mohd Salleh (Malaysia) |

| 21 December Friendly | Thailand | 1–5 | Germany | Bangkok, Thailand |
| 12:30 | Chaikamdee 57' | Report | Kurányi 34', 38'; Podolski 73', 89'; Asamoah 84' | Stadium: Rajamangala Stadium; Attendance: 15,000; Referee: Shamsul Maidin (Singapore) |

=== 2005 ===
| 9 February Friendly | Germany | 2–2 | Argentina | Düsseldorf, Germany |
| 20:45 | Frings 28' (pen.); Kurányi 45' | Report | Crespo 40' (pen.), 81' | Stadium: LTU-Arena; Attendance: 51,500; Referee: Stefano Farina (Italy) |

| 26 March Friendly | Slovenia | 0–1 | Germany | Celje, Slovenia |
| 20:00 | | Report | Podolski 27' | Stadium: Arena Petrol; Attendance: 9,000; Referee: Graham Poll (England) |

| 4 June Friendly | Northern Ireland | 1–4 | Germany | Belfast, Northern Ireland |
| 20:30 | Healy 15' (pen.) | Report | Asamoah 17'; Ballack 62', 66' (pen.); Podolski 82' | Stadium: Windsor Park; Attendance: 14,000; Referee: Charlie Richmond (Scotland) |

| 8 June Friendly | Germany | 2–2 | Russia | Mönchengladbach, Germany |
| 20:45 | Schweinsteiger 30', 69' | Report | Anyukov 26'; Arshavin 90' | Stadium: Borussia-Park; Attendance: 45,600; Referee: Konrad Plautz (Austria) |

| 15 June 2005 FIFA Confederations Cup; Group A | Germany | 4–3 | Australia | Frankfurt am Main, Germany |
| 21:00 | Kurányi 17'; Mertesacker 23'; Ballack 60' (pen.); Podolski 88' | Report | Skoko 21'; Aloisi 31', 90+2' | Stadium: Waldstadion; Attendance: 46,466; Referee: Carlos Amarilla (Paraguay) |

| 18 June 2005 FIFA Confederations Cup; Group A | Tunisia | 0–3 | Germany | Cologne, Germany |
| 18:00 | | Report | Ballack 74' (pen.); Schweinsteiger 80'; Hanke 88' | Stadium: RheinEnergieStadion; Attendance: 44,377; Referee: Peter Prendergast (Jamaica) |

| 21 June 2005 FIFA Confederations Cup; Group A | Argentina | 2–2 | Germany | Nuremberg, Germany |
| 20:45 | Riquelme 33'; Cambiasso 74' | Report | Kurányi 29'; Asamoah 51' | Stadium: Frankenstadion; Attendance: 42,088; Referee: Ľuboš Micheľ (Slovakia) |

| 25 June 2005 FIFA Confederations Cup; Semi Final | Germany | 2–3 | Brazil | Nuremberg, Germany |
| 18:00 | Podolski 23'; Ballack 45+3' (pen.) | Report | Adriano 21', 76'; Ronaldinho 43' (pen.) | Stadium: Frankenstadion; Attendance: 42,187; Referee: Carlos Chandía (Chile) |

| 29 June 2005 FIFA Confederations Cup; Third Place Match | Germany | 4–3 (a.e.t.) | Mexico | Leipzig, Germany |
| 18:00 | Podolski 37'; Schweinsteiger 41'; Huth 79'; Ballack 97' | Report | Fonseca 40'; Borgetti 58', 85' | Stadium: Zentralstadion; Attendance: 43,335; Referee: Matthew Breeze (Australia) |

| 17 August Friendly | Netherlands | 2–2 | Germany | Rotterdam, Netherlands |
| 20:30 | Robben 3', 46' | Report | Ballack 50'; Asamoah 81' | Stadium: De Kuip; Attendance: 45,500; Referee: Terje Hauge (Norway) |

| 3 September Friendly | Slovakia | 2–0 | Germany | Bratislava, Slovakia |
| 20:00 | Karhan 21' (pen.), 38' | Report | | Stadium: Tehelné pole Attendance: 9,276; Referee: Eric Braamhaar (Netherlands) |

| 7 September Friendly | Germany | 4–2 | South Africa | Bremen, Germany |
| 20:30 | Podolski 12', 48', 55'; Borowski 47' | Report | Bartlett 26' (pen.); McCarthy 50' | Stadium: Weserstadion; Attendance: 28,100; Referee: Grzegorz Gilewski (Poland) |

| 8 October Friendly | Turkey | 2–1 | Germany | Istanbul, Turkey |
| 20:00 | Halil Altıntop 24'; Şahin 87' | Report | Neuville 90' | Stadium: Atatürk Olympic Stadium; Attendance: 23,000; Referee: Domenico Messina (Italy) |

| 12 October Friendly | Germany | 1–0 | China | Hamburg, Germany |
| 20:30 | Frings 51' (pen.) | Report | | Stadium: AOL-Arena; Attendance: 50,000; Referee: Lucílio Batista (Portugal) |

| 12 November Friendly | France | 0–0 | Germany | Saint-Denis, France |
| 21:00 | | Report | | Stadium: Stade de France; Attendance: 58,889; Referee: Steve Bennett (England) |

=== 2006 ===
| 1 March Friendly | Italy | 4–1 | Germany | Florence, Italy |
| 21:00 | Gilardino 4'; Toni 7'; De Rossi 39'; Del Piero 57' | Report | Huth 82' | Stadium: Stadio Artemio Franchi; Attendance: 28,317; Referee: Eduardo Iturralde González (Spain) |

| 22 March Friendly | Germany | 4–1 | United States | Dortmund, Germany |
| 20:30 | Schweinsteiger 47'; Neuville 73'; Klose 75'; Ballack 79' | Report | Johnson 86' | Stadium: Signal Iduna Park; Attendance: 64,500; Referee: Peter Fröjdfeldt (Sweden) |

| 27 May Friendly | Germany | 7–0 | Luxembourg | Freiburg, Germany |
| 17:00 | Klose 5', 59'; Frings 19' (pen.); Podolski 36', 65' (pen.); Neuville 90', 90' | Report | | Stadium: badenova-Stadion; Attendance: 23,000; Referee: René Rogalla (Switzerland) |

| 30 May Friendly | Germany | 2–2 | Japan | Leverkusen, Germany |
| 20:30 | Klose 76'; Schweinsteiger 79' | Report | Takahara 57', 65' | Stadium: BayArena; Attendance: 22,500; Referee: Kyros Vassaras (Greece) |

| 2 June Friendly | Germany | 3–0 | Colombia | Mönchengladbach, Germany |
| 19:00 | Ballack 21'; Schweinsteiger 38'; Borowski 69' | Report | | Stadium: Borussia-Park; Attendance: 45,600; Referee: Terje Hauge (Norway) |

| 9 June 2006 FIFA World Cup; Group A | Germany | 4–2 | Costa Rica | Munich, Germany |
| 18:00 | Lahm 6'; Klose 17', 61'; Frings 87' | Report | Wanchope 12', 73' | Stadium: FIFA WM Stadion München; Attendance: 66,000; Referee: Horacio Elizondo (Argentina) |

| 14 June 2006 FIFA World Cup; Group A | Germany | 1–0 | Poland | Dortmund, Germany |
| 21:00 | Neuville 90+1' | Report | | Stadium: FIFA WM Stadion Dortmund; Attendance: 65,000; Referee: Luis Medina Cantalejo (Spain) |

| 20 June 2006 FIFA World Cup; Group A | Ecuador | 0–3 | Germany | Berlin, Germany |
| 16:00 | | Report | Klose 4', 44'; Podolski 57' | Stadium: Olympiastadion; Attendance: 72,000; Referee: Valentin Ivanov (Russia) |

| 24 June 2006 FIFA World Cup; Round of 16 | Germany | 2–0 | Sweden | Munich, Germany |
| 17:00 | Podolski 4', 12' | Report | | Stadium: FIFA WM Stadion München; Attendance: 66,000; Referee: Carlos Simon (Brazil) |

| 30 June 2006 FIFA World Cup; Quarter Final | Germany | 1–1 (a.e.t.) (4–2 p) | Argentina | Berlin, Germany |
| 17:00 | Klose 80' | Report | Ayala 49' | Stadium: Olympiastadion; Attendance: 72,000; Referee: Ľuboš Micheľ (Slovakia) |
| | Penalties |
| | Neuville (penalty scored); Ballack (penalty scored); Podolski (penalty scored); Borowski (penalty scored) | | (penalty scored) Cruz; (penalty missed) Ayala; (penalty scored) Rodríguez; (penalty missed) Cambiasso |

| 4 July 2006 FIFA World Cup; Semi Final | Germany | 0–2 (a.e.t.) | Italy | Dortmund, Germany |
| 21:00 | | Report | Grosso 119'; Del Piero 120+1' | Stadium: FIFA WM Stadion Dortmund; Attendance: 65,000; Referee: Benito Archundia (Mexico) |

| 8 July 2006 FIFA World Cup; Third Place Match | Germany | 3–1 | Portugal | Stuttgart, Germany |
| 21:00 | Schweinsteiger 56', 78'; Petit 60' (o.g.) | Report | Nuno Gomes 88' | Stadium: Gottlieb-Daimler-Stadion; Attendance: 52,000; Referee: Toru Kamikawa (Japan) |

| 16 August Friendly | Germany | 3–0 | Sweden | Gelsenkirchen, Germany |
| 20:45 | Schneider 4'; Klose 8', 44' | Report | | Stadium: Veltins-Arena; Attendance: 53,000; Referee: Stefano Farina (Italy) |

| 2 September UEFA Euro 2008; Qualifying Group D | Germany | 1–0 | Republic of Ireland | Stuttgart, Germany |
| 20:45 | Podolski 57' | Report | | Stadium: Gottlieb-Daimler-Stadion; Attendance: 53,198; Referee: Luis Medina Cantalejo (Spain) |

| 6 September UEFA Euro 2008; Qualifying Group D | San Marino | 0–13 | Germany | Serravalle, San Marino |
| 20:45 | | Report | Podolski 12', 43', 64', 73'; Schweinsteiger 29', 47'; Klose 30', 45+1'; Ballack 35'; Hitzlsperger 66', 72'; M. Friedrich 87'; Schneider 90' (pen.) | Stadium: Stadio Olimpico; Attendance: 5,019; Referee: Selçuk Dereli (Turkey) |

| 7 October Friendly | Germany | 2–0 | Georgia | Rostock, Germany |
| 20:00 | Schweinsteiger 24'; Ballack 67' | Report | | Stadium: Ostseestadion; Attendance: 28,000; Referee: Gerald Lehner (Austria) |

| 11 October UEFA Euro 2008; Qualifying Group D | Slovakia | 1–4 | Germany | Bratislava, Slovakia |
| 20:45 | Varga 88' | Report | Podolski 13', 72'; Ballack 25'; Schweinsteiger 36' | Stadium: Tehelné pole Attendance: 21,582; Referee: Terje Hauge (Norway) |

| 15 November UEFA Euro 2008; Qualifying Group D | Cyprus | 1–1 | Germany | Nicosia, Cyprus |
| 20:00 | Okkas 43' | Report | Ballack 16' | Stadium: Neo GSP Stadium; Attendance: 15,000; Referee: Peter Fröjdfeldt (Sweden) |

=== 2007 ===
| 7 February Friendly | Germany | 3–1 | Switzerland | Düsseldorf, Germany |
| 20:00 | Kurányi 7'; Gómez 30'; Frings 66' | Report | Streller 71' | Stadium: LTU-Arena; Attendance: 51,333; Referee: Ruud Bossen (Netherlands) |

| 24 March UEFA Euro 2008; Qualifying Group D | Czech Republic | 1–2 | Germany | Prague, Czech Republic |
| 20:45 | Baroš 77' | Report | Kurányi 42', 62' | Stadium: Toyota Arena; Attendance: 17,821; Referee: Roberto Rosetti (Italy) |

| 28 March Friendly | Germany | 0–1 | Denmark | Duisburg, Germany |
| 20:00 | | Report | Bendtner 81' | Stadium: MSV-Arena; Attendance: 31,500; Referee: Howard Webb (England) |

| 2 June UEFA Euro 2008; Qualifying Group D | Germany | 6–0 | San Marino | Nuremberg, Germany |
| 19:00 | Kurányi 45'; Jansen 52'; Frings 56' (pen.); Gómez 63', 65'; Fritz 67' | Report | | Stadium: Frankenstadion; Attendance: 43,967; Referee: Jouni Hyytiä (Finland) |

| 6 June UEFA Euro 2008; Qualifying Group D | Germany | 2–1 | Slovakia | Hamburg, Germany |
| 20:30 | Ďurica 10' (o.g.); Hitzlsperger 43' | Report | Metzelder 20' (o.g.) | Stadium: AOL-Arena; Attendance: 51,500; Referee: Olegário Benquerença (Portugal) |

| 22 August Friendly | England | 1–2 | Germany | London, England |
| 21:00 | Lampard 9' | Report | Kurányi 26'; Pander 40' | Stadium: Wembley Stadium; Attendance: 86,111; Referee: Massimo Busacca (Switzerland) |

| 8 September UEFA Euro 2008; Qualifying Group D | Wales | 0–2 | Germany | Cardiff, Wales |
| 20:30 | | Report | Klose 5', 60' | Stadium: Millennium Stadium; Attendance: 25,000; Referee: Manuel Mejuto González (Spain) |

| 12 September Friendly | Germany | 3–1 | Romania | Cologne, Germany |
| 20:30 | Schneider 42'; Odonkor 66'; Podolski 82' | Report | Goian 3' | Stadium: RheinEnergieStadion; Attendance: 44,000; Referee: Nicola Rizzoli (Italy) |

| 13 October UEFA Euro 2008; Qualifying Group D | Republic of Ireland | 0–0 | Germany | Dublin, Ireland |
| 20:45 | | Report | | Stadium: Croke Park; Attendance: 67,495; Referee: Martin Hansson (Sweden) |

| 17 October UEFA Euro 2008; Qualifying Group D | Germany | 0–3 | Czech Republic | Munich, Germany |
| 20:45 | | Report | Sionko 2'; Matějovský 23'; Plašil 63' | Stadium: Allianz Arena; Attendance: 66,600; Referee: Howard Webb (England) |

| 17 November UEFA Euro 2008; Qualifying Group D | Germany | 4–0 | Cyprus | Hanover, Germany |
| 20:00 | Fritz 2'; Klose 20'; Podolski 53'; Hitzlsperger 82' | Report | | Stadium: AWD-Arena; Attendance: 45,016; Referee: Peter Rasmussen (Denmark) |

| 21 November UEFA Euro 2008; Qualifying Group D | Germany | 0–0 | Wales | Frankfurt, Germany |
| 20:30 | | Report | | Stadium: Commerzbank-Arena; Attendance: 49,252; Referee: Cristian Balaj (Romania) |

=== 2008 ===
| 6 February Friendly | Austria | 0–3 | Germany | Vienna, Austria |
| 20:30 | | Report | Hitzlsperger 53'; Klose 63'; Gómez 80' | Stadium: Ernst-Happel-Stadion; Attendance: 48,500; Referee: Paolo Dondarini (Italy) |

| 26 March Friendly | Switzerland | 0–4 | Germany | Basel, Switzerland |
| 20:45 | | Report | Klose 23'; Gómez 61', 67'; Podolski 89' | Stadium: St. Jakob-Park; Attendance: 38,500; Referee: Eric Braamhaar (Netherlands) |

| 27 May Friendly | Germany | 2–2 | Belarus | Kaiserslautern, Germany |
| 17:45 | Klose 10'; Karytska 20' (o.g.) | Report | Bulyga 61', 88' | Stadium: Fritz-Walter-Stadion; Attendance: 47,258; Referee: Darko Čeferin (Slovenia) |

| 31 May Friendly | Germany | 2–1 | Serbia | Gelsenkirchen, Germany |
| 17:30 | Neuville 74'; Ballack 83' | Report | Janković 18' | Stadium: Veltins-Arena; Attendance: 53,354; Referee: Fredy Fautrel (France) |

| 8 June UEFA Euro 2008; Group B | Germany | 2–0 | Poland | Klagenfurt, Austria |
| 20:45 | Podolski 20', 72' | Report | | Stadium: Hypo-Arena; Attendance: 30,461; Referee: Tom Henning Øvrebø (Norway) |

| 12 June UEFA Euro 2008; Group B | Croatia | 2–1 | Germany | Klagenfurt, Austria |
| 18:00 | Srna 24'; Olić 62' | Report | Podolski 79' | Stadium: Hypo-Arena; Attendance: 30,461; Referee: Frank De Bleeckere (Belgium) |

| 16 June UEFA Euro 2008; Group B | Austria | 0–1 | Germany | Vienna, Austria |
| 20:45 | | Report | Ballack 49' | Stadium: Ernst-Happel-Stadion; Attendance: 51,428; Referee: Manuel Mejuto González (Spain) |

| 19 June UEFA Euro 2008; Quarter Final | Portugal | 2–3 | Germany | Basel, Switzerland |
| 20:45 | Nuno Gomes 40'; Postiga 87' | Report | Schweinsteiger 22'; Klose 26'; Ballack 61' | Stadium: St. Jakob-Park; Attendance: 39,374; Referee: Peter Fröjdfeldt (Sweden) |

| 25 June UEFA Euro 2008; Semi Final | Germany | 3–2 | Turkey | Basel, Switzerland |
| 20:45 | Schweinsteiger 26'; Klose 79'; Lahm 90' | Report | U. Boral 22'; Semih 86' | Stadium: St. Jakob-Park; Attendance: 39,374; Referee: Massimo Busacca (Switzerland) |

| 29 June UEFA Euro 2008; Final | Germany | 0–1 | Spain | Vienna, Austria |
| 20:45 | | Report | Torres 33' | Stadium: Ernst-Happel-Stadion; Attendance: 51,428; Referee: Roberto Rosetti (Italy) |

| 20 August Friendly | Germany | 2–0 | Belgium | Nuremberg, Germany |
| 21:00 | Schweinsteiger 59' (pen.); Marin 77' | Report | | Stadium: easyCredit-Stadion; Attendance: 34,117; Referee: Thomas Vejlgaard (Denmark) |

| 6 September 2010 FIFA World Cup; Qualification Group 4 | Liechtenstein | 0–6 | Germany | Vaduz, Liechtenstein |
| 20:45 | | Report | Podolski 21', 48'; Rolfes 64'; Schweinsteiger 65'; Hitzlsperger 75'; Westermann 86' | Stadium: Rheinpark Stadion; Attendance: 6,021; Referee: Duarte Gomes (Portugal) |

| 10 September 2010 FIFA World Cup; Qualification Group 4 | Finland | 3–3 | Germany | Helsinki, Finland |
| 19:35 | Johansson 33'; Väyrynen 43'; Sjölund 53' | Report | Klose 38', 45', 83' | Stadium: Helsinki Olympic Stadium; Attendance: 37,150; Referee: Viktor Kassai (Hungary) |

| 11 October 2010 FIFA World Cup; Qualification Group 4 | Germany | 2–1 | Russia | Dortmund, Germany |
| 20:45 | Podolski 9'; Ballack 28' | Report | Arshavin 51' | Stadium: Signal Iduna Park; Attendance: 65,607; Referee: Peter Fröjdfeldt (Sweden) |

| 15 October 2010 FIFA World Cup; Qualification Group 4 | Germany | 1–0 | Wales | Mönchengladbach, Germany |
| 20:45 | Trochowski 72' | Report | | Stadium: Borussia-Park; Attendance: 44,500; Referee: Laurent Duhamel (France) |

| 19 November Friendly | Germany | 1–2 | England | Berlin, Germany |
| 20:45 | Helmes 64' | Report | Upson 23'; Terry 84' | Stadium: Olympiastadion; Attendance: 74,244; Referee: Massimo Busacca (Switzerland) |

=== 2009 ===
| 11 February Friendly | Germany | 0–1 | Norway | Düsseldorf, Germany |
| 20:30 | | Report | Grindheim 63' | Stadium: LTU Arena; Attendance: 45,000; Referee: Stefan Meßner (Austria) |

| 28 March 2010 FIFA World Cup; Qualification Group 4 | Germany | 4–0 | Liechtenstein | Leipzig, Germany |
| 20:00 | Ballack 4'; Jansen 9'; Schweinsteiger 48'; Podolski 50' | Report | | Stadium: Zentralstadion; Attendance: 43,368; Referee: Igor Ishchenko (Ukraine) |

| 1 April 2010 FIFA World Cup; Qualification Group 4 | Wales | 0–2 | Germany | Cardiff, Wales |
| 20:45 | | Report | Ballack 11'; Williams 48' (o.g.) | Stadium: Millennium Stadium; Attendance: 26,064; Referee: Terje Hauge (Norway) |

| 29 May Friendly | China | 1–1 | Germany | Shanghai, China |
| 14:00 | Hao 5' | Report | Podolski 8' | Stadium: Shanghai Stadium; Attendance: 25,000; Referee: Lee Min-hu (South Korea) |

| 2 June Friendly | United Arab Emirates | 2–7 | Germany | Dubai, United Arab Emirates |
| 20:00 | Al Hammadi 53'; Mubarak 73' | Report | Westermann 29'; Gómez 35', 45', 47', 90'; Trochowski 39'; Jumaa 52' (o.g.) | Stadium: Al-Maktoum Stadium; Attendance: 25,000; Referee: Naser Al-Ghafary (Jordan) |

| 12 August 2010 FIFA World Cup; Qualification Group 4 | Azerbaijan | 0–2 | Germany | Baku, Azerbaijan |
| 18:00 | | Report | Schweinsteiger 11'; Klose 53' | Stadium: Tofik Bakhramov Stadium; Attendance: 22,500; Referee: Alan Kelly (Ireland) |

| 5 September Friendly | Germany | 2–0 | South Africa | Leverkusen, Germany |
| 20:45 | Gómez 36'; Özil 77' | Report | | Stadium: BayArena; Attendance: 29,569; Referee: Claudio Circhetta (Switzerland) |

| 9 September 2010 FIFA World Cup; Qualification Group 4 | Germany | 4–0 | Azerbaijan | Hanover, Germany |
| 20:45 | Ballack 14' (pen.); Klose 55', 65'; Podolski 71' | Report | | Stadium: AWD-Arena; Attendance: 35,369; Referee: Anastasios Kakos (Greece) |

| 10 October 2010 FIFA World Cup; Qualification Group 4 | Russia | 0–1 | Germany | Moscow, Russia |
| 17:00 | | Report | Klose 35' | Stadium: Luzhniki Stadium; Attendance: 72,100; Referee: Massimo Busacca (Switzerland) |

| 14 October 2010 FIFA World Cup; Qualification Group 4 | Germany | 1–1 | Finland | Hamburg, Germany |
| 18:00 | Podolski 90' | Report | Jonatan Johansson 11' | Stadium: HSH Nordbank Arena; Attendance: 51,500; Referee: Martin Atkinson (England) |

| 18 November Friendly | Germany | 2–2 | Ivory Coast | Gelsenkirchen, Germany |
| 20:45 | Podolski 11' (pen.), 90' | Report | Eboué 57'; Doumbia 85' | Stadium: Veltins-Arena; Attendance: 33,015; Referee: Björn Kuipers (Netherlands) |

== 2010s ==
=== 2010 ===
| 3 March Friendly | Germany | 0–1 | Argentina | Munich, Germany |
| 20:45 CET (UTC+01:00) | | Report | Higuaín 45' | Stadium: Allianz Arena; Attendance: 65,152; Referee: Martin Atkinson (England) |

| 13 May Friendly | Germany | 3–0 | Malta | Aachen, Germany |
| 18:00 CEST (UTC+02:00) | Cacau 16', 58'; Scicluna 61' (o.g.) | Report | | Stadium: New Tivoli; Attendance: 27,000; Referee: Alain Hamer (Luxembourg) |

| 29 May Friendly | Hungary | 0–3 | Germany | Budapest, Hungary |
| 20:00 CEST (UTC+02:00) | | Report | Podolski 5' (pen.); Gómez 69'; Cacau 73' | Stadium: Ferenc Puskás Stadium; Attendance: 48,000; Referee: Claus Bo Larsen (Denmark) |

| 3 June Friendly | Germany | 3–1 | Bosnia and Herzegovina | Frankfurt, Germany |
| 20:30 CEST (UTC+02:00) | Lahm 50'; Schweinsteiger 71' (pen.), 77' (pen.) | Report | Džeko 15' | Stadium: Commerzbank-Arena; Attendance: 48,000; Referee: Nicola Rizzoli (Italy) |

| 13 June 2010 FIFA World Cup; Group D | Germany | 4–0 | Australia | Durban, South Africa |
| 20:30 SAST (UTC+2:00) | Podolski 8'; Klose 26'; Müller 68'; Cacau 70' | Report | Cahill (red card) 56' | Stadium: Moses Mabhida Stadium; Attendance: 62,660; Referee: Marco Antonio Rodríguez (Mexico) |

| 18 June 2010 FIFA World Cup; Group D | Germany | 0–1 | Serbia | Port Elizabeth, South Africa |
| 13:30 SAST (UTC+2:00) | Klose (yellow card) 12' (yellow-red card) 37' | Report | Jovanović 38' | Stadium: Nelson Mandela Bay Stadium; Attendance: 38,294; Referee: Alberto Undiano Mallenco (Spain) |

| 23 June 2010 FIFA World Cup; Group D | Ghana | 0–1 | Germany | Johannesburg, South Africa |
| 20:30 SAST (UTC+2:00) | | Report | Özil 60' | Stadium: Soccer City; Attendance: 83,391; Referee: Carlos Eugênio Simon (Brazil) |

| 27 June 2010 FIFA World Cup; Round of 16 | Germany | 4–1 | England | Bloemfontein, South Africa |
| 20:30 SAST (UTC+2:00) | Klose 20'; Podolski 32'; Müller 67', 70' | Report | Upson 37' | Stadium: Free State Stadium; Attendance: 40,510; Referee: Jorge Larrionda (Uruguay) |

| 3 July 2010 FIFA World Cup; Quarter Final | Argentina | 0–4 | Germany | Cape Town, South Africa |
| 20:30 SAST (UTC+2:00) | | Report | Müller 3'; Klose 68', 89'; Friedrich 74' | Stadium: Cape Town Stadium; Attendance: 64,100; Referee: Ravshan Irmatov (Uzbekistan) |

| 7 July 2010 FIFA World Cup; Semi Final | Germany | 0–1 | Spain | Durban, South Africa |
| 20:30 SAST (UTC+2:00) | | Report | Puyol 73' | Stadium: Moses Mabhida Stadium; Attendance: 60,960; Referee: Viktor Kassai (Hungary) |

| 10 July 2010 FIFA World Cup; Third Place Match | Uruguay | 2–3 | Germany | Port Elizabeth, South Africa |
| 20:30 SAST (UTC+2:00) | Cavani 28'; Forlán 51' | Report | Müller 18'; Jansen 56'; Khedira 82' | Stadium: Nelson Mandela Bay Stadium; Attendance: 36,254; Referee: Benito Archundia (Mexico) |

| 11 August Friendly | Denmark | 2–2 | Germany | Copenhagen, Denmark |
| 20:30 CEST (UTC+02:00) | Rommedahl 74'; Junker 87' | Report | Gómez 19'; Helmes 73' | Stadium: Parken Stadium; Attendance: 19,071; Referee: Alan Kelly (Republic of Ireland) |

| 3 September UEFA Euro 2012 Qualifying; Group A | Belgium | 0–1 | Germany | Brussels, Belgium |
| 20:45 CEST (UTC+02:00) | | Report | Klose 51' | Stadium: King Baudouin Stadium; Attendance: 47,000; Referee: Terje Hauge (Norway) |

| 7 September UEFA Euro 2012 Qualifying; Group A | Germany | 6–1 | Azerbaijan | Cologne, Germany |
| 20:45 CEST (UTC+02:00) | Westermann 28'; Podolski 45'; Klose 45', 90'; Sadygov 53' (o.g.); Badstuber 86' | Report | Javadov 57' | Stadium: RheinEnergieStadion; Attendance: 43,751; Referee: Markus Strömbergsson (Sweden) |

| 8 October UEFA Euro 2012 Qualifying; Group A | Germany | 3–0 | Turkey | Berlin, Germany |
| 20:45 CEST (UTC+02:00) | Klose 42', 89'; Özil 79' | Report | | Stadium: Olympiastadion; Attendance: 74,244; Referee: Howard Webb (England) |

| 12 October UEFA Euro 2012 Qualifying; Group A | Kazakhstan | 0–3 | Germany | Astana, Kazakhstan |
| 19:00 CEST (UTC+02:00) | | Report | Klose 48'; Gómez 76'; Podolski 85' | Stadium: Astana Arena; Attendance: 20,000; Referee: Alexandru Tudor (Romania) |

| 17 November Friendly | Sweden | 0–0 | Germany | Gothenburg, Sweden |
| 20:30 CET (UTC+01:00) | | Report | | Stadium: Ullevi; Attendance: 21,959; Referee: Carlos Velasco Carballo (Spain) |

=== 2011 ===
| 9 February Friendly | Germany | 1–1 | Italy | Dortmund, Germany |
| 20:45 CEST (UTC+02:00) | Klose 16' | Report | Rossi 81' | Stadium: Signal Iduna Park; Attendance: 60,196; Referee: Eric Braamhaar (Netherlands) |

| 26 March UEFA Euro 2012 Qualifying; Group A | Germany | 4–0 | Kazakhstan | Kaiserslautern, Germany |
| 20:00 CEST (UTC+02:00) | Klose 3', 88'; Müller 25', 43' | Report | | Stadium: Fritz-Walter-Stadion; Attendance: 47,984; Referee: Aleksandar Stavrev (Macedonia) |

| 29 March Friendly | Germany | 1–2 | Australia | Mönchengladbach, Germany |
| 20:45 CEST (UTC+02:00) | Gómez 26' | Report | Carney 61'; Wilkshire 64' (pen.) | Stadium: Borussia-Park; Attendance: 30,152; Referee: Stéphane Lannoy (France) |

| 29 May Friendly | Germany | 2–1 | Uruguay | Sinsheim, Germany |
| 20:00 CEST (UTC+02:00) | Gómez 20'; Schürrle 35' | Report | Gargano 48' | Stadium: Rhein-Neckar-Arena; Attendance: 25,655; Referee: Olegario Benquerença (Portugal) |

| 3 June UEFA Euro 2012 Qualifying; Group A | Austria | 1–2 | Germany | Vienna, Austria |
| 20:30 CEST (UTC+02:00) | Friedrich 50' (o.g.) | Report | Gómez 44', 90' | Stadium: Ernst-Happel-Stadion; Attendance: 47,500; Referee: Massimo Busacca (Switzerland) |

| 7 June UEFA Euro 2012 Qualifying; Group A | Azerbaijan | 1–3 | Germany | Baku, Azerbaijan |
| 19:00 CEST (UTC+02:00) | Hüseynov 89' | Report | Özil 30'; Gómez 41'; Schürrle 90' | Stadium: Tofiq Bahramov Republican Stadium; Attendance: 25,000; Referee: Michail Koukoulakis (Greece) |

| 10 August Friendly | Germany | 3–2 | Brazil | Stuttgart, Germany |
| 20:45 CEST (UTC+02:00) | Schweinsteiger 61' (pen.); Götze 67'; Schürrle 80' | Report | Robinho 71' (pen.); Neymar 90' | Stadium: Mercedes-Benz Arena; Attendance: 54,767; Referee: Viktor Kassai (Hungary) |

| 2 September UEFA Euro 2012 Qualifying; Group A | Germany | 6–2 | Austria | Gelsenkirchen, Germany |
| 20:45 CEST (UTC+02:00) | Klose 8'; Özil 23', 47'; Podolski 28'; Schürrle 84'; Götze 89' | Report | Arnautović 42'; Harnik 51' | Stadium: Veltins-Arena; Attendance: 53,313; Referee: Paolo Tagliavento (Italy) |

| 6 September Friendly | Poland | 2–2 | Germany | Gdańsk, Poland |
| 20:45 CEST (UTC+02:00) | Lewandowski 55'; Błaszczykowski 90' (pen.) | Report | Kroos 68' (pen.); Cacau 90' | Stadium: PGE Arena Gdańsk; Attendance: 38,000; Referee: Daniele Orsato (Italy) |

| 7 October UEFA Euro 2012 Qualifying; Group A | Turkey | 1–3 | Germany | Istanbul, Turkey |
| 20:30 CEST (UTC+02:00) | Balta 79' | Report | Gómez 35'; Müller 66'; Schweinsteiger 86' (pen.) | Stadium: Türk Telekom Arena; Attendance: 50,000; Referee: Martin Atkinson (England) |

| 11 October UEFA Euro 2012 Qualifying; Group A | Germany | 3–1 | Belgium | Düsseldorf, Germany |
| 19:00 CEST (UTC+02:00) | Özil 30'; Schürrle 33'; Gómez 48' | Report | Fellaini 86' | Stadium: ESPRIT arena Attendance: 48,483; Referee: Svein Moen (Norway) |

| 11 November Friendly | Ukraine | 3–3 | Germany | Kyiv, Ukraine |
| 20:45 CEST (UTC+02:00) | Yarmolenko 28'; Konoplyanka 37'; Nazarenko 45' | Report | Kroos 38'; Rolfes 65'; Müller 77' | Stadium: Olimpiyskiy Stadium; Attendance: 69,720; Referee: Carlos Velasco Carballo (Spain) |

| 15 November Friendly | Germany | 3–0 | Netherlands | Hamburg, Germany |
| 20:45 CEST (UTC+02:00) | Müller 15'; Klose 26'; Özil 66' | Report | | Stadium: Imtech Arena; Attendance: 51,500; Referee: Cüneyt Çakır (Turkey) |

=== 2012 ===
| 29 February Friendly | Germany | 1–2 | France | Bremen, Germany |
| 20:45 CEST (UTC+02:00) | Cacau 90' | Report | Giroud 21'; Malouda 69' | Stadium: Weser-Stadion; Attendance: 37,800; Referee: Paolo Tagliavento (Italy) |

| 26 May Friendly | Switzerland | 5–3 | Germany | Basel, Switzerland |
| 18:00 CEST (UTC+02:00) | Derdiyok 21', 23', 50'; Lichtsteiner 67'; Mehmedi 76' | Report | Hummels 45'; Schürrle 64'; Reus 72' | Stadium: St. Jakob-Park; Attendance: 27,381; Referee: Antony Gautier (France) |

| 31 May Friendly | Germany | 2–0 | Israel | Leipzig, Germany |
| 20:30 CEST (UTC+02:00) | Gómez 40'; Schürrle 82' | Report | | Stadium: Red Bull Arena; Attendance: 43,241; Referee: Kevin Blom (Netherlands) |

| 9 June UEFA Euro 2012; Group B | Germany | 1–0 | Portugal | Lviv, Ukraine |
| 21:45 CEST (UTC+02:00) | Gómez 72' | Report | | Stadium: Arena Lviv; Attendance: 32,990; Referee: Stéphane Lannoy (France) |

| 13 June UEFA Euro 2012; Group B | Netherlands | 1–2 | Germany | Kharkiv, Ukraine |
| 21:45 CEST (UTC+02:00) | Van Persie 73' | Report | Gómez 24', 38' | Stadium: Metalist Stadium; Attendance: 37,750; Referee: Jonas Eriksson (Sweden) |

| 17 June UEFA Euro 2012; Group B | Denmark | 1–2 | Germany | Lviv, Ukraine |
| 21:45 CEST (UTC+02:00) | Krohn-Dehli 24' | Report | Podolski 19'; L. Bender 80' | Stadium: Arena Lviv; Attendance: 32,990; Referee: Carlos Velasco Carballo (Spain) |

| 22 June UEFA Euro 2012; Quarter-finals | Germany | 4–2 | Greece | Gdańsk, Poland |
| 20:45 CEST (UTC+02:00) | Lahm 39'; Khedira 61'; Klose 68'; Reus 74' | Report | Samaras 55'; Salpingidis 89' (pen.) | Stadium: PGE Arena; Attendance: 38,751; Referee: Damir Skomina (Slovenia) |

| 28 June UEFA Euro 2012; Semi-finals | Germany | 1–2 | Italy | Warsaw, Poland |
| 20:45 CEST (UTC+02:00) | Özil 90+2' (pen.) | Report | Balotelli 20', 36' | Stadium: National Stadium; Attendance: 55,540; Referee: Stéphane Lannoy (France) |

| 15 August Friendly | Germany | 1–3 | Argentina | Frankfurt, Germany |
| 20:45 CEST (UTC+02:00) | Zieler (red card) 30'; Höwedes 82' | Report | Messi (penalty missed) 32' 52'; Khedira 45' (o.g.); Di María 73' | Stadium: Commerzbank-Arena; Attendance: 48,808; Referee: Jonas Eriksson (Sweden) |

| 7 September 2014 FIFA World Cup; Qualification Group C | Germany | 3–0 | Faroe Islands | Hanover, Germany |
| 20:45 CEST (UTC+02:00) | Götze 28'; Özil 54', 72' | Report | | Stadium: AWD-Arena; Attendance: 32,769; Referee: Bobby Madden (Scotland) |

| 11 September 2014 FIFA World Cup; Qualification Group C | Austria | 1–2 | Germany | Vienna, Austria |
| 20:30 CEST (UTC+02:00) | Junuzović 57' | Report | Reus 44'; Özil 52' (pen.) | Stadium: Ernst-Happel-Stadion; Attendance: 47,000; Referee: Björn Kuipers (Netherlands) |

| 12 October 2014 FIFA World Cup; Qualification Group C | Republic of Ireland | 1–6 | Germany | Dublin, Republic of Ireland |
| 19:45 CEST (UTC+02:00) | Keogh 90+2' | Report | Reus 32', 40'; Özil 55' (pen.); Klose 58'; Kroos 61', 83' | Stadium: Aviva Stadium; Attendance: 51,151; Referee: Nicola Rizzoli (Italy) |

| 16 October 2014 FIFA World Cup; Qualification Group C | Germany | 4–4 | Sweden | Berlin, Germany |
| 20:45 CEST (UTC+02:00) | Klose 8', 15'; Mertesacker 39'; Özil 56' | Report | Ibrahimović 62'; Lustig 64'; Elmander 76'; Elm 90+3' | Stadium: Olympiastadion; Attendance: 72,369; Referee: Pedro Proença (Portugal) |

| 14 November Friendly | Netherlands | 0–0 | Germany | Amsterdam, Netherlands |
| 20:45 CET (UTC+01:00) | | Report | | Stadium: Amsterdam Arena; Attendance: 51,000; Referee: Pedro Proença (Portugal) |

=== 2013 ===
| 6 February Friendly | France | 1–2 | Germany | Saint-Denis, France |
| 21:00 | Valbuena 44' | Summary | Müller 51'; Khedira 74' | Stadium: Stade de France; Attendance: 75,000; Referee: Paolo Mazzoleni (Italy) |

| 22 March 2014 FIFA World Cup; Qualification Group C | Kazakhstan | 0–3 | Germany | Astana, Kazakhstan |
| | | Report | Müller 20', 74'; Götze 22' | Stadium: Astana Arena; Attendance: 43,520; Referee: Anastasios Kakos (Greece) |

| 26 March 2014 FIFA World Cup; Qualification Group C | Germany | 4–1 | Kazakhstan | Nuremberg, Germany |
| | Reus 23', 90'; Götze 27'; Gündoğan 31' | Report | Schmidtgal 46' | Stadium: easyCredit-Stadion; Attendance: 43,520; Referee: Halis Özkahya (Turkey) |

| 29 May Friendly | Ecuador | 2–4 | Germany | Boca Raton, United States |
| | Valencia 45'; Ayoví 84' | Report | Podolski 1', 17'; Bender 4', 24' | Stadium: FAU Stadium; Attendance: 5,500; Referee: Ricardo Salazar (United States) |

| 2 June Friendly | United States | 4–3 | Germany | Washington, United States |
| | Altidore 13'; Ter Stegen 16' (o.g.); Dempsey 60', 64' | Report | Westermann 51'; Kruse 79'; Draxler 81' | Stadium: Robert F. Kennedy Memorial Stadium; Attendance: 47,359; Referee: Paul Enrique Delgadillo Haro (Mexico) |

| 14 August Friendly | Germany | 3–3 | Paraguay | Kaiserslautern, Germany |
| | Gündoğan 18'; Müller 31'; Bender 75' | Report | Núñez 9'; Pittoni 13'; Samudio 45' | Stadium: Fritz-Walter-Stadion; Attendance: 47,522; Referee: Ivan Bebek (Croatia) |

| 6 September 2014 FIFA World Cup; Qualification Group C | Germany | 3–0 | Austria | Munich, Germany |
| | Klose 33'; Kroos 51'; Müller 88' | Report | | Stadium: Allianz Arena; Attendance: 68,000; Referee: Milorad Mažić (Serbia) |

| 10 September 2014 FIFA World Cup; Qualification Group C | Faroe Islands | 0–3 | Germany | Tórshavn, Faroe Islands |
| | Gregersen (red card) 73' | Report | Mertesacker 22'; Özil 74' (pen.); Müller 84' | Stadium: Tórsvøllur; Attendance: 4,118; Referee: Gediminas Mažeika (Lithuania) |

| 11 October 2014 FIFA World Cup; Qualification Group C | Germany | 3–0 | Republic of Ireland | Cologne, Germany |
| | Khedira 12'; Schürrle 58'; Özil 90' | Report | | Stadium: RheinEnergieStadion; Attendance: 46,237; Referee: Serge Gumienny (Belgium) |

| 15 October 2014 FIFA World Cup; Qualification Group C | Sweden | 3–5 | Germany | Solna, Sweden |
| | Hysén 6', 69'; Kačaniklić 42' | Report | Özil 45'; Götze 53'; Schürrle 57', 66', 76' | Stadium: Friends Arena; Attendance: 49,251; Referee: Willie Collum (Scotland) |

| 15 November Friendly | Italy | 1–1 | Germany | Milan, Italy |
| | Abate 28' | Report | Hummels 8' | Stadium: San Siro; Referee: Olegário Benquerença (Portugal) |

| 19 November Friendly | England | 0–1 | Germany | London, England |
| | | Report | Mertesacker 39' | Stadium: Wembley Stadium; Referee: Stéphane Lannoy (France) |

=== 2014 ===
| 5 March Friendly | Germany | 1–0 | Chile | Stuttgart, Germany |
| 20:45 CET (UTC+01:00) | Götze 16' | Report | | Stadium: Mercedes-Benz Arena; Attendance: 54,449; Referee: Mark Clattenburg (England) |

| 13 May Friendly | Germany | 0–0 | Poland | Hamburg, Germany |
| 20:45 CEST (UTC+02:00) | | Report | | Stadium: Imtech Arena; Attendance: 37,569; Referee: David Fernández Borbalán (Spain) |

| 1 June Friendly | Germany | 2–2 | Cameroon | Mönchengladbach, Germany |
| 20:30 CEST (UTC+02:00) | Müller 66'; Schürrle 71' | Report | Eto'o 62'; Choupo-Moting 78' | Stadium: Borussia-Park; Attendance: 41,250; Referee: Damir Skomina (Slovenia) |

| 6 June Friendly | Germany | 6–1 | Armenia | Mainz, Germany |
| 20:45 CEST (UTC+02:00) | Schürrle 52'; Podolski 72'; Höwedes 73'; Klose 77'; Götze 82', 89' | Report | Mkhitaryan 69' (pen.) | Stadium: Coface Arena; Attendance: 27,000; Referee: Harald Lechner (Austria) |

| 16 June 2014 FIFA World Cup; Group G | Germany | 4–0 | Portugal | Salvador, Brazil |
| 13:00 BRT (UTC−03:00); 18:00 CEST (UTC+02:00) | Müller 12' (pen.), 45', 78'; Hummels 32' | Report | Pepe (red card) 37' | Stadium: Arena Fonte Nova; Attendance: 51,081; Referee: Milorad Mažić (Serbia); Man of the Match: Thomas Müller |

| 21 June 2014 FIFA World Cup; Group G | Germany | 2–2 | Ghana | Fortaleza, Brazil |
| 16:00 BRT (UTC−03:00); 21:00 CEST (UTC+02:00) | Götze 51'; Klose 71' | Report | A. Ayew 54'; Gyan 63' | Stadium: Estádio Castelão; Attendance: 59,621; Referee: Sandro Ricci (Brazil); Man of the Match: Mario Götze |

| 26 June 2014 FIFA World Cup; Group G | United States | 0–1 | Germany | Recife, Brazil |
| 13:00 BRT (UTC−03:00); 18:00 CEST (UTC+02:00) | | Report | Müller 55' | Stadium: Arena Pernambuco; Attendance: 41,876; Referee: Ravshan Irmatov (Uzbekistan); Man of the Match: Thomas Müller |

| 30 June 2014 FIFA World Cup; Round of 16 | Germany | 2–1 (a.e.t.) | Algeria | Porto Alegre, Brazil |
| 17:00 BRT (UTC−03:00); 22:00 CEST (UTC+02:00) | Schürrle 92'; Özil 119' | Report | Djabou 120+1' | Stadium: Estádio Beira-Rio; Attendance: 43,063; Referee: Sandro Ricci (Brazil); Man of the Match: Raïs M'Bolhi (Algeria) |

| 4 July 2014 FIFA World Cup; Quarter Final | France | 0–1 | Germany | Rio de Janeiro, Brazil |
| 13:00 BRT (UTC−03:00); 18:00 CEST (UTC+02:00) | | Report | Hummels 13' | Stadium: Estádio do Maracanã; Attendance: 74,240; Referee: Néstor Pitana (Argentina); Man of the Match: Mats Hummels |

| 8 July 2014 FIFA World Cup; Semi Final | Brazil | 1–7 | Germany | Belo Horizonte, Brazil |
| 17:00 BRT (UTC−03:00); 22:00 CEST (UTC+02:00) | Oscar 90' | Report | Müller 11'; Klose 23'; Kroos 24', 26'; Khedira 29'; Schürrle 69', 79' | Stadium: Estádio Mineirão; Attendance: 58,141; Referee: Marco Rodríguez (Mexico); Man of the Match: Toni Kroos |

| 13 July 2014 FIFA World Cup; Final | Germany | 1–0 (a.e.t.) | Argentina | Rio de Janeiro, Brazil |
| 16:00 BRT (UTC−03:00); 21:00 CEST (UTC+02:00) | Götze 113' | Report | | Stadium: Estádio do Maracanã; Attendance: 74,738; Referee: Nicola Rizzoli (Italy); Man of the Match: Mario Götze |

| 3 September Friendly | Germany | 2–4 | Argentina | Düsseldorf, Germany |
| 20:45 CEST (UTC+02:00) | Schürrle 52'; Götze 78' | Report | Agüero 20'; Lamela 40'; Fernández 47'; Di María 50' | Stadium: Esprit Arena; Attendance: 51,132; Referee: Björn Kuipers (Netherlands) |

| 7 September UEFA Euro 2016; Qualifying Group D | Germany | 2–1 | Scotland | Dortmund, Germany |
| 20:45 CEST (UTC+02:00) | Müller 18', 70' | Report | Anya 66' | Stadium: Signal Iduna Park; Attendance: 60,209; Referee: Svein Oddvar Moen (Norway) |

| 11 October UEFA Euro 2016; Qualifying Group D | Poland | 2–0 | Germany | Warsaw, Poland |
| 20:45 CEST (UTC+02:00) | Milik 51'; Mila 88' | Report | | Stadium: Stadion Narodowy; Referee: Pedro Proença (Portugal) |

| 14 October UEFA Euro 2016; Qualifying Group D | Germany | 1–1 | Republic of Ireland | Gelsenkirchen, Germany |
| 20:45 CEST (UTC+02:00) | Kroos 71' | Report | O'Shea 90+4' | Stadium: Veltins-Arena; Attendance: 52,000; Referee: Damir Skomina (Slovenia) |

| 14 November UEFA Euro 2016; Qualifying Group D | Germany | 4–0 | Gibraltar | Nuremberg, Germany |
| 20:45 CET (UTC+01:00) | Müller 12', 29'; Götze 38'; Santos 67' (o.g.) | Report | | Stadium: Grundig-Stadion; Attendance: 44,308; Referee: Alexandru Tudor (Romania) |

| 18 November Friendly | Spain | 0–1 | Germany | Vigo, Spain |
| 20:45 CET (UTC+01:00) | | Report | Kroos 89' | Stadium: Balaídos; Attendance: 25,000; Referee: Stefan Johannesson (Sweden) |

=== 2015 ===
| 25 March Friendly | Germany | 2–2 | Australia | Kaiserslautern, Germany |
| 20:30 UTC+1 | Reus 17'; Podolski 81' | Report | Troisi 40'; Jedinak 50' | Stadium: Fritz-Walter-Stadion; Attendance: 46,000; Referee: Michael Oliver (England) |

| 29 March UEFA Euro 2016; Qualifying Group D | Georgia | 0–2 | Germany | Tbilisi, Georgia |
| 20:00 UTC+4 | | Report | Reus 39'; Müller 44' | Stadium: Boris Paichadze Dinamo Arena; Attendance: 51,000; Referee: Clément Turpin (France) |

| 10 June Friendly | Germany | 1–2 | United States | Cologne, Germany |
| 20:45 UTC+2 | Götze 12' | | Diskerud 41'; Wood 87' | Stadium: RheinEnergieStadion; Attendance: 40,348; Referee: Danny Makkelie (Netherlands) |

| 13 June UEFA Euro 2016; Qualifying Group D | Gibraltar | 0–7 | Germany | Faro/Loulé, Portugal |
| 19:45 UTC+1 | | Report | Schürrle 28', 65', 71'; Kruse 47', 81'; Gündoğan 51'; Bellarabi 57' | Stadium: Estádio Algarve; Attendance: 7,467; Referee: Clayton Pisani (Malta) |

| 4 September UEFA Euro 2016; Qualifying Group D | Germany | 3–1 | Poland | Frankfurt am Main, Germany |
| 20:45 (20:45 UTC+2) | Müller 12'; Götze 19', 82' | | Lewandowski 37' | Stadium: Commerzbank-Arena; Attendance: 48,500; Referee: Nicola Rizzoli (Italy) |

| 7 September UEFA Euro 2016; Qualifying Group D | Scotland | 2–3 | Germany | Glasgow, Scotland |
| 20:45 (20:45 UTC+2) | Hummels 28' (o.g.); McArthur 43' | | Müller 18', 34'; Gündoğan 54' | Stadium: Hampden Park; Attendance: 50,753; Referee: István Vad (Hungary) |

| 8 October UEFA Euro 2016; Qualifying Group D | Republic of Ireland | 1–0 | Germany | Dublin, Ireland |
| 20:45 | Long 70' | | | Stadium: Aviva Stadium; Attendance: 50,604; Referee: Carlos Velasco Carballo (Spain |

| 11 October UEFA Euro 2016; Qualifying Group D | Germany | 2–1 | Georgia | Leipzig, Germany |
| 20:45 | Müller 50' (pen.); Kruse 79' | | Kankava 53' | Stadium: Red Bull Arena; Attendance: 43,630; Referee: Pavel Královec (Czech Republic) |

| 13 November Friendly | France | 2–0 | Germany | Saint-Denis, France |
| 21:00 | Giroud 45+1'; Gignac 86' | | | Stadium: Stade de France; Referee: Antonio Mateu Lahoz (Spain) |

=== 2016 ===
| 26 March Friendly | Germany | 2–3 | England | Berlin, Germany |
| 19:45 GMT; Match 951 | Kroos 43'; Gómez 57' | | Kane 61'; Vardy 74'; Dier 90+1' | Stadium: Olympiastadion; Referee: Gianluca Rocchi (Italy) |

| 29 March Friendly | Germany | 4–1 | Italy | Munich, Germany |
| 20:45 CEST (UTC+02:00) | Kroos 24'; Götze 45'; Hector 59'; Özil 75' (pen.) | | El Shaarawy 83' | Stadium: Allianz Arena; Attendance: 62,653; Referee: Oliver Drachta (Austria) |

| 29 May Friendly | Germany | 1–3 | Slovakia | Augsburg, Germany |
| 17:45 CEST (UTC+02:00) | Gómez 13' (pen.) | DFB Report; UEFA Report | Hamšík 41'; Ďuriš 44'; Kucka 52' | Stadium: WWK ARENA; Attendance: 22,110; Referee: Serge Gumienny (Belgium) |

| 4 June Friendly | Germany | 2–0 | Hungary | Gelsenkirchen, Germany |
| 18:00 CEST (UTC+02:00) | Lang 39' (o.g.); Müller 63' | DFB Report; UEFA Report | | Stadium: Veltins-Arena; Attendance: 52,104; Referee: Martin Strömbergsson (Sweden) |

| 12 June UEFA Euro 2016; Group C | Germany | 2–0 | Ukraine | Villeneuve-d'Ascq, France |
| 21:00 | Mustafi 19'; Schweinsteiger 90+2' | Report | | Stadium: Stade Pierre-Mauroy; Attendance: 43,035; Referee: Martin Atkinson (England) |

| 16 June UEFA Euro 2016; Group C | Germany | 0–0 | Poland | Saint-Denis, France |
| 21:00 | | Report | | Stadium: Stade de France; Attendance: 73,648; Referee: Björn Kuipers (Netherlands) |

| 21 June UEFA Euro 2016; Group C | Northern Ireland | 0–1 | Germany | Paris, France |
| 18:00 | | Report | Gómez 30' | Stadium: Parc des Princes; Attendance: 44,125; Referee: Clément Turpin (France) |

| 26 June UEFA Euro 2016; Round of 16 | Germany | 3–0 | Slovakia | Villeneuve-d'Ascq, France |
| 18:00 | Boateng 8'; Gómez 43'; Draxler 63' | Report | | Stadium: Stade Pierre-Mauroy; Attendance: 44,312; Referee: Szymon Marciniak (Poland) |

| 2 July UEFA Euro 2016; Quarter-final | Germany | 1–1 (a.e.t.) (6–5 p) | Italy | Bordeaux, France |
| 21:00 CEST (UTC+02:00) | Özil 65' | Report | Bonucci 78' (pen.) | Stadium: Nouveau Stade de Bordeaux; Attendance: 38,764; Referee: Viktor Kassai (Hungary) |
| | Penalties |
| | Kroos (penalty scored); Müller (penalty missed); Özil (penalty missed); Draxler (penalty scored); Schweinsteiger (penalty missed); Hummels (penalty scored); Kimmich (penalty scored); Boateng (penalty scored); Hector (penalty scored) | | (penalty scored) Insigne; (penalty missed) Zaza; (penalty scored) Barzagli; (penalty missed) Pellè; (penalty missed) Bonucci; (penalty scored) Giaccherini; (penalty scored) Parolo; (penalty scored) De Sciglio; (penalty missed) Darmian |

| 7 July UEFA Euro 2016; Semi-final | Germany | 0–2 | France | Marseille, France |
| 21:00 CEST (UTC+02:00) | | report | Griezmann 45+2' (pen.), 72' | Stadium: Stade Vélodrome; Attendance: 64,078; Referee: Nicola Rizzoli (Italy) |

| 31 August Friendly | Germany | 2–0 | Finland | Mönchengladbach, Germany |
| 20:45 CEST (UTC+02:00) | Meyer 55'; Arajuuri 77' (o.g.) | Report | | Stadium: Borussia-Park; Attendance: 30,121; Referee: Aleksei Kulbakov (Belarus) |

| 4 September 2018 FIFA World Cup; Qualification Group C | Norway | 0–3 | Germany | Oslo, Norway |
| 20:45 | | Report (FIFA); Report (UEFA) | Müller 16', 60'; Kimmich 45' | Stadium: Ullevaal Stadion; Referee: Willie Collum (Scotland) |

| 8 October 2018 FIFA World Cup; Qualification Group C | Germany | 3–0 | Czech Republic | Hamburg, Germany |
| 20:45 CEST (UTC+02:00) | Müller 13', 65'; Kroos 49' | Report (FIFA); Report (UEFA) | | Stadium: Volksparkstadion; Attendance: 51,299; Referee: Ovidiu Hațegan (Romania) |

| 11 October 2018 FIFA World Cup; Qualification Group C | Germany | 2–0 | Northern Ireland | Hannover, Germany |
| 20:45 CEST (UTC+02:00) | Draxler 13'; Khedira 17' | Report (FIFA); Report (UEFA) | | Stadium: HDI-Arena; Attendance: 42,132; Referee: Paolo Tagliavento (Italy) |

| 11 November 2018 FIFA World Cup; Qualification Group C | San Marino | 0–8 | Germany | Serravalle, San Marino |
| 20:45 | | Report (FIFA); Report (UEFA) | Khedira 7'; Gnabry 9', 58', 76'; Hector 32', 65'; Stefanelli 82' (o.g.); Volland 85' | Stadium: San Marino Stadium; Attendance: 3,851; Referee: Artyom Kuchin (Kazakhstan) |

| 15 November Friendly | Italy | 0–0 | Germany | Milan, Italy |
| CET (UTC+01:00) | | Report | | Stadium: San Siro; Referee: Artur Soares Dias (Portugal) |

=== 2017 ===
| 22 March Friendly | Germany | 1–0 | England | Dortmund, Germany |
| 20:45 CET (UTC+01:00) | Podolski 69' | Report (DFB) | | Stadium: Signal Iduna Park; Referee: Damir Skomina (Slovenia) |

| 26 March 2018 FIFA World Cup; Qualification Group C | Azerbaijan | 1–4 | Germany | Baku, Azerbaijan |
| 20:00 AZT (UTC+04:00); 18:00 CEST (UTC+02:00) | Nazarov 31' | Report (FIFA); Report (UEFA) | Schürrle 19', 81'; Müller 36'; Gómez 45' | Stadium: Tofiq Bahramov Stadium; Attendance: 30,000; Referee: Daniele Orsato (Italy) |

| 6 June Friendly | Denmark | 1–1 | Germany | Brøndby, Denmark |
| 20:45 CEST (UTC+02:00) | Eriksen 18' | Report (DFB) | Kimmich 88' | Stadium: Brøndby Stadium; Attendance: 15,488; Referee: Michael Oliver (England) |

| 10 June 2018 FIFA World Cup; Qualification Group C | Germany | 7–0 | San Marino | Nuremberg, Germany |
| 20:45 CEST (UTC+02:00) | Draxler 11'; Wagner 16', 29', 85'; Younes 38'; Mustafi 47'; Brandt 72' | Report (FIFA); Report (UEFA) | | Stadium: Stadion Nürnberg; Attendance: 32,467; Referee: Radu Petrescu (Romania) |

| 19 June 2017 FIFA Confederations Cup; Group B | Australia | 2–3 | Germany | Sochi, Russia |
| 18:00 MSK (UTC+03:00); 17:00 CEST (UTC+02:00) | Rogic 41'; Juric 56' | Report (FIFA) | Stindl 5'; Draxler 44' (pen.); Goretzka 48' | Stadium: Fisht Olympic Stadium; Attendance: 28,605; Referee: Mark Geiger (United States) |

| 22 June 2017 FIFA Confederations Cup; Group B | Germany | 1–1 | Chile | Kazan, Russia |
| 21:00 MSK (UTC+03:00); 20:00 CEST (UTC+02:00) | Stindl 41' | Report (FIFA) | Sánchez 6' | Stadium: Kazan Arena; Attendance: 38,222; Referee: Alireza Faghani (Iran) |

| 25 June 2017 FIFA Confederations Cup; Group B | Germany | 3–1 | Cameroon | Sochi, Russia |
| 18:00 MSK (UTC+03:00); 17:00 CEST (UTC+02:00) | Demirbay 48'; Werner 66', 81' | Report (FIFA) | Aboubakar 78' | Stadium: Fisht Olympic Stadium; Attendance: 30,230; Referee: Wilmar Roldán (Colombia) |

| 29 June 2017 FIFA Confederations Cup; Semi-final | Germany | 4–1 | Mexico | Sochi, Russia |
| 21:00 MSK (UTC+03:00); 20:00 CEST (UTC+02:00) | Goretzka 6', 8'; Werner 59'; Younes 90+1' | Report | Fabián 89' | Stadium: Fisht Olympic Stadium; Attendance: 37,923; Referee: Néstor Pitana (Argentina) |

| 2 July 2017 FIFA Confederations Cup; Final | Chile | 0–1 | Germany | Saint Petersburg, Russia |
| 21:00 MSK (UTC+03:00); 20:00 CEST (UTC+02:00) | | Report | Stindl 20' | Stadium: Krestovsky Stadium; Attendance: 57,268; Referee: Milorad Mažić (Serbia) |

| 1 September 2018 FIFA World Cup; Qualification Group C | Czech Republic | 1–2 | Germany | Prague, Czech Republic |
| 20:45 CEST (UTC+02:00) | Darida 78' | Report (FIFA); Report (UEFA) | Werner 4'; Hummels 88' | Stadium: Eden Arena; Referee: Sergei Karasev (Russia) |

| 4 September 2018 FIFA World Cup; Qualification Group C | Germany | 6–0 | Norway | Stuttgart, Germany |
| 20:45 CEST (UTC+02:00) | Özil 10'; Draxler 17'; Werner 21', 40'; Goretzka 50'; Gómez 79' | Report (FIFA); Report (UEFA) | | Stadium: Mercedes-Benz Arena; Referee: Gediminas Mažeika (Lithuania) |

| 5 October 2018 FIFA World Cup; Qualification Group C | Northern Ireland | 1–3 | Germany | Belfast, Northern Ireland |
| 20:45 CEST (UTC+02:00) | Magennis 90+3' | Report (FIFA); Report (UEFA) | Rudy 2'; Wagner 21'; Kimmich 86' | Stadium: Windsor Park; Referee: Danny Makkelie (Netherlands) |

| 8 October 2018 FIFA World Cup; Qualification Group C | Germany | 5–1 | Azerbaijan | Kaiserslautern, Germany |
| 20:45 CEST (UTC+02:00) | Goretzka 9', 66'; Wagner 54'; Rüdiger 64'; Can 81' | Report (FIFA); Report (UEFA) | Sheidaev 34' | Stadium: Fritz-Walter-Stadion; Referee: Andris Treimanis (Latvia) |

| 10 November Friendly | England | 0–0 | Germany | London, England |
| 21:00 (20:00 UTC+00:00) | | Report (DFB) | | Stadium: Wembley Stadium; Attendance: 81,382; Referee: Paweł Raczkowski (Poland) |

| 14 November Friendly | Germany | 2–2 | France | Cologne, Germany |
| 20:45 (20:45 UTC+01:00) | Werner 56'; Stindl 90+3' | Report (DFB) | Lacazette 34', 71' | Stadium: RheinEnergieStadion; Attendance: 36,948; Referee: Cüneyt Çakır (Turkey) |

=== 2018 ===
| 23 March Friendly | Germany | 1–1 | Spain | Düsseldorf, Germany |
| 20:45 (20:45 UTC+1) | Müller 35' | Report (DFB) | Rodrigo 6' | Stadium: ESPRIT arena Attendance: 50,653; Referee: Willie Collum (Scotland) |

| 27 March Friendly | Germany | 0–1 | Brazil | Berlin, Germany |
| 20:45 (20:45 UTC+2) | | Report (DFB) | Gabriel Jesus 37' | Stadium: Olympiastadion; Attendance: 72,717; Referee: Jonas Eriksson (Sweden) |

| 2 June Friendly | Austria | 2–1 | Germany | Klagenfurt, Austria |
| 18:00 (18:00 UTC+2) | Hinteregger 53'; Schöpf 69' | Report (DFB) | Özil 11' | Stadium: Wörthersee Stadion; Attendance: 29,200; Referee: Pavel Královec (Czech Republic) |

| 8 June Friendly | Germany | 2–1 | Saudi Arabia | Leverkusen, Germany |
| 19:30 (19:30 UTC+2) | Werner 8'; Hawsawi 43' (o.g.) | Report (DFB) | Al-Jassim 84' | Stadium: BayArena; Attendance: 30,210; Referee: Slavko Vinčić (Slovenia) |

| 17 June 2018 FIFA World Cup; Group F | Germany | 0–1 | Mexico | Moscow, Russia |
| 17:00 (18:00 UTC+3) | | Report (FIFA) | Lozano 35' | Stadium: Luzhniki Stadium; Attendance: 78,011; Referee: Alireza Faghani (Iran) |

| 23 June 2018 FIFA World Cup; Group F | Germany | 2–1 | Sweden | Sochi, Russia |
| 20:00 (21:00 UTC+3) | Reus 48'; Kroos 90+5'; Boateng (yellow card) (yellow-red card) 82' | Report (FIFA) | Toivonen 32' | Stadium: Fisht Olympic Stadium; Attendance: 44,287; Referee: Szymon Marciniak (Poland) |

| 27 June 2018 FIFA World Cup; Group F | South Korea | 2–0 | Germany | Kazan, Russia |
| 16:00 (17:00 UTC+3) | Kim Young-gwon 90+3'; Son Heung-min 90+6' | Report (FIFA) | | Stadium: Kazan Arena; Attendance: 41,835; Referee: Mark Geiger (United States) |

| 6 September 2018–19 UEFA Nations League A Group 1 | Germany | 0–0 | France | Munich, Germany |
| 20:45 (20:45 UTC+2) | | Report (UEFA) | | Stadium: Allianz Arena; Attendance: 67,485; Referee: Daniele Orsato (Italy) |

| 9 September Friendly | Germany | 2–1 | Peru | Sinsheim, Germany |
| 20:45 (20:45 UTC+2) | Brandt 25'; Schulz 85' | Report (DFB) | Advíncula 22' | Stadium: Rhein-Neckar-Arena; Attendance: 25,494; Referee: Robert Schörgenhofer (Austria) |

| 13 October 2018–19 UEFA Nations League A Group 1 | Netherlands | 3–0 | Germany | Amsterdam, Netherlands |
| 20:45 (20:45 UTC+2) | Van Dijk 30'; Depay 87'; Wijnaldum 90+3' | Report (UEFA) | | Stadium: Johan Cruyff Arena; Attendance: 52,536; Referee: Cüneyt Çakır (Turkey) |

| 16 October 2018–19 UEFA Nations League A Group 1 | France | 2–1 | Germany | Saint-Denis, France |
| 20:45 (20:45 UTC+2) | Griezmann 62', 80' (pen.) | Report (UEFA) | Kroos 14' (pen.) | Stadium: Stade de France; Attendance: 77,300; Referee: Milorad Mažić (Serbia) |

| 15 November Friendly | Germany | 3–0 | Russia | Leipzig, Germany |
| 20:45 (20:45 UTC+1) | Sané 8'; Süle 25'; Gnabry 40' | Report (DFB) | | Stadium: Red Bull Arena; Attendance: 35,288; Referee: Sandro Schärer (Switzerland) |

| 19 November 2018–19 UEFA Nations League A Group 1 | Germany | 2–2 | Netherlands | Gelsenkirchen, Germany |
| 20:45 (20:45 UTC+1) | Werner 9'; Sané 20' | Report (UEFA) | Promes 85'; Van Dijk 90+1' | Stadium: Veltins-Arena; Attendance: 42,186; Referee: Ovidiu Hațegan (Romania) |

=== 2019 ===
| 20 March 2019 Friendly | Germany | 1–1 | Serbia | Wolfsburg, Germany |
| 20:45 (20:45 UTC+1) | Goretzka 69' | Report (DFB) | Jović 12' | Stadium: Volkswagen Arena; Attendance: 26,101; Referee: Bobby Madden (Scotland) |

| 24 March 2019 UEFA Euro 2020 Qualifying Group C | Netherlands | 2–3 | Germany | Amsterdam, Netherlands |
| 20:45 (20:45 UTC+2) | De Ligt 48'; Depay 63' | Report (UEFA) | Sané 15'; Gnabry 34'; Schulz 90' | Stadium: Johan Cruyff Arena; Attendance: 51,694; Referee: Jesús Gil Manzano (Spain) |

| 8 June 2019 UEFA Euro 2020 Qualifying Group C | Belarus | 0–2 | Germany | Barysaw, Belarus |
| 20:45 (20:45 UTC+2) | | Report (UEFA) | Sané 13'; Reus 62' | Stadium: Borisov Arena; Attendance: 12,510; Referee: Srđan Jovanović (Serbia) |

| 11 June 2019 UEFA Euro 2020 Qualifying Group C | Germany | 8–0 | Estonia | Mainz, Germany |
| 20:45 (20:45 UTC+2) | Reus 10', 37'; Gnabry 17', 62'; Goretzka 20'; Gündoğan 26' (pen.); Werner 79'; Sané 88' | Report (UEFA) | | Stadium: Opel Arena; Attendance: 26,050; Referee: Ali Palabıyık (Turkey) |

| 6 September 2019 UEFA Euro 2020 Qualifying Group C | Germany | 2–4 | Netherlands | Hamburg, Germany |
| 20:45 (20:45 UTC+2) | Gnabry 9'; Kroos 73' (pen.) | Report (UEFA) | F. de Jong 59'; Tah 66' (o.g.); Malen 79'; Wijnaldum 90+1' | Stadium: Volksparkstadion; Attendance: 51,299; Referee: Artur Soares Dias (Portugal) |

| 9 September 2019 UEFA Euro 2020 Qualifying Group C | Northern Ireland | 0–2 | Germany | Belfast, Northern Ireland |
| 20:45 (19:45 UTC+1) | | Report (UEFA) | Halstenberg 48'; Gnabry 90+3' | Stadium: Windsor Park; Attendance: 18,326; Referee: Daniele Orsato (Italy) |

| 9 October 2019 Friendly | Germany | 2–2 | Argentina | Dortmund, Germany |
| 20:45 (20:45 UTC+2) | Gnabry 15'; Havertz 22' | Report (DFB) | Alario 66'; Ocampos 85' | Stadium: Signal Iduna Park; Attendance: 45,197; Referee: Clément Turpin (France) |

| 13 October 2019 UEFA Euro 2020 Qualifying Group C | Estonia | 0–3 | Germany | Tallinn, Estonia |
| 20:45 (21:45 UTC+3) | | Report (UEFA) | Gündoğan 51', 57'; Werner 71' | Stadium: A. Le Coq Arena; Attendance: 12,062; Referee: Georgi Kabakov (Bulgaria) |

| 16 November 2019 UEFA Euro 2020 Qualifying Group C | Germany | 4–0 | Belarus | Mönchengladbach, Germany |
| 20:45 (20:45 UTC+2) | Ginter 41'; Goretzka 49'; Kroos 55', 83' | Report (UEFA) | | Stadium: Borussia-Park; Attendance: 33,164; Referee: Orel Grinfeld (Israel) |

| 19 November 2019 UEFA Euro 2020 Qualifying Group C | Germany | 6–1 | Northern Ireland | Frankfurt, Germany |
| 20:45 (20:45 UTC+2) | Gnabry 19', 47', 60'; Goretzka 43', 73'; Brandt 90+1' | Report (UEFA) | Smith 7' | Stadium: Commerzbank-Arena; Attendance: 42,855; Referee: Carlos del Cerro Grande (Spain) |

== Cancelled matches ==
Below is a list of all matches in the period that were cancelled. Matches that were rescheduled to another date are not included.

| 14 November 2009 Friendly | Germany | v | Chile | Cologne, Germany |
| | | | | Stadium: RheinEnergieStadion |
Note: Because of the suicide of German football national goalkeeper Robert Enke, the match was cancelled by the DFB.

| 18 November 2009 Friendly | Germany | v | Egypt | Gelsenkirchen, Germany |
| | | | | Stadium: Veltins-Arena |
Note: Since Egypt had to play a World Cup qualification third round fixture against Algeria, it was not possible to host this match. Instead, Germany played against Ivory Coast.

| 25 March 2015 Friendly | Germany | v | Israel |
Note: Israel had to use this date for a European Championship qualifier against Belgium rescheduled from 9 September 2014 as a result of the Gaza War (the German team played against Australia instead).

| 17 November 2015 Friendly | Germany | v | Netherlands | Hanover, Germany |
| | | | | Stadium: HDI-Arena |
Note: The first international match after the November 2015 Paris attacks was cancelled 90 minutes before the start due to intelligence warnings.

== See also ==
- East Germany national football team results (1952–1990)
- Germany national football team all-time record
- Germany national football team results (1908–1929)
- Germany national football team results (1930–1942)
- Germany national football team results (1990–1999)
- Germany national football team results (2020–present)
- West Germany national football team results (1952–1990)
