= UEFA Euro 2016 qualifying Group D =

European football competition

The UEFA Euro 2016 qualifying Group D was one of the nine groups to decide which teams would qualify for the UEFA Euro 2016 finals tournament. Group D consisted of six teams: Germany, Republic of Ireland, Poland, Scotland, Georgia, and Gibraltar, where they played against each other home-and-away in a round-robin format.

The top two teams, Germany and Poland, qualified directly for the finals. As third-placed Republic of Ireland weren't the highest-ranked among all third-placed teams, they advanced to the play-offs, where they won against Bosnia and Herzegovina and thus qualified as well.

== Background ==
The Germany national football team was looking to maintain its record of qualifying for every European Championship since 1972. Scotland and the Republic of Ireland both proposed the expansion of the European Championship and it was considered "ironic" by the Republic of Ireland manager, Martin O'Neill, that the two were drawn in the same group. The chairman of the Polish Football Association, Zbigniew Boniek, stated that he was happy with the draw. Georgia national football team manager, Temur Ketsbaia, said that the new system would give Georgia the chance to qualify and said that Georgia would aim for third place in the group.

The Gibraltar national football team competed in the European Championship qualifiers for the first time after becoming members of UEFA in May 2013. Gibraltar play their home matches at Estádio Algarve in Faro, Algarve, Portugal, as their home ground, Victoria Stadium, has an artificial pitch and does not meet UEFA international standards. They were initially drawn in UEFA Euro 2016 qualifying Group C, but with Spain—who claims the territory—already in that group, UEFA moved Gibraltar to Group D.

== Standings ==
| Pos | Team | Pld | W | D | L | GF | GA | GD | Pts | Qualification | (Germany) | (Poland) | (Republic of Ireland) | (Scotland) | (Georgia (country)) | (Gibraltar) |
|---|---|---|---|---|---|---|---|---|---|---|---|---|---|---|---|---|
| 1 | Germany | 10 | 7 | 1 | 2 | 24 | 9 | +15 | 22 | Qualify for final tournament | — | 3–1 | 1–1 | 2–1 | 2–1 | 4–0 |
| 2 | Poland | 10 | 6 | 3 | 1 | 33 | 10 | +23 | 21 | Qualify for final tournament | 2–0 | — | 2–1 | 2–2 | 4–0 | 8–1 |
| 3 | Republic of Ireland | 10 | 5 | 3 | 2 | 19 | 7 | +12 | 18 | Advance to play-offs | 1–0 | 1–1 | — | 1–1 | 1–0 | 7–0 |
| 4 | Scotland | 10 | 4 | 3 | 3 | 22 | 12 | +10 | 15 | | 2–3 | 2–2 | 1–0 | — | 1–0 | 6–1 |
| 5 | Georgia | 10 | 3 | 0 | 7 | 10 | 16 | −6 | 9 | | 0–2 | 0–4 | 1–2 | 1–0 | — | 4–0 |
| 6 | Gibraltar | 10 | 0 | 0 | 10 | 2 | 56 | −54 | 0 | | 0–7 | 0–7 | 0–4 | 0–6 | 0–3 | — |

Source: UEFA
Rules for classification: Qualification tiebreakers

== Matches ==
The fixtures were released by UEFA the same day as the draw, which was held on 23 February 2014 in Nice. Times are CET/CEST, (Note: CET (UTC+1) for matches on 14 November 2014, and CEST (UTC+2) for all other matches.) as listed by UEFA (local times are in parentheses).

7 September 2014
18:00
(20:00 UTC+4)

| Georgia | 1–2 | Republic of Ireland |
|---|---|---|
| Okriashvili 38' | Report | McGeady 24', 90' |

Boris Paichadze Dinamo Arena, Tbilisi
Attendance: 22,000
Referee: Kevin Blom (Netherlands)
7 September 2014
20:45
(20:45 UTC+2)

| Germany | 2–1 | Scotland |
|---|---|---|
| Müller 18', 70' | Report | Anya 66' |

Signal Iduna Park, Dortmund
Attendance: 60,209
Referee: Svein Oddvar Moen (Norway)
7 September 2014
20:45
(19:45 UTC+1)

| Gibraltar | 0–7 | Poland |
|---|---|---|
| | Report | Grosicki 11', 48'; Lewandowski 50', 53', 86', 90+2'; Szukała 58' |

Estádio Algarve, Faro/Loulé, Portugal (Note: Gibraltar played their home matches at Estádio Algarve in Portugal instead of their regular stadium, Victoria Stadium, in Gibraltar.)
Attendance: 1,620
Referee: Stefan Johannesson (Sweden)

11 October 2014
18:00
(17:00 UTC+1)

| Republic of Ireland | 7–0 | Gibraltar |
|---|---|---|
| Keane 6', 14', 18' (pen.); McClean 46', 53'; J. Perez 52' (o.g.); Hoolahan 56' | Report |

Aviva Stadium, Dublin
Attendance: 35,123
Referee: Leontios Trattou (Cyprus)
11 October 2014
18:00
(17:00 UTC+1)

| Scotland | 1–0 | Georgia |
|---|---|---|
| Khubutia 28' (o.g.) | Report |

Ibrox Stadium, Glasgow (Note: Scotland played their first two home matches at other stadiums (against Georgia at Ibrox Stadium, Glasgow, and against Republic of Ireland at Celtic Park, Glasgow) instead of their regular stadium, Hampden Park, Glasgow, as it was only reopened for football in "late 2014" after hosting the 2014 Commonwealth Games.)
Attendance: 34,719
Referee: Miroslav Zelinka (Czech Republic)
11 October 2014
20:45
(20:45 UTC+2)

| Poland | 2–0 | Germany |
|---|---|---|
| Milik 51'; Mila 88' | Report |

Stadion Narodowy, Warsaw
Attendance: 56,934
Referee: Pedro Proença (Portugal)

14 October 2014
20:45
(20:45 UTC+2)

| Germany | 1–1 | Republic of Ireland |
|---|---|---|
| Kroos 71' | Report | O'Shea 90+4' |

Veltins-Arena, Gelsenkirchen
Attendance: 51,204
Referee: Damir Skomina (Slovenia)
14 October 2014
20:45
(19:45 UTC+1)

| Gibraltar | 0–3 | Georgia |
|---|---|---|
| | Report | Gelashvili 9'; Okriashvili 19'; Kankava 69' |

Estádio Algarve, Faro/Loulé, Portugal
Attendance: 281
Referee: Harald Lechner (Austria)
14 October 2014
20:45
(20:45 UTC+2)

| Poland | 2–2 | Scotland |
|---|---|---|
| Mączyński 11'; Milik 76' | Report | Maloney 18'; Naismith 57' |

Stadion Narodowy, Warsaw
Attendance: 55,197
Referee: Alberto Undiano Mallenco (Spain)

14 November 2014
18:00
(21:00 UTC+4)

| Georgia | 0–4 | Poland |
|---|---|---|
| | Report | Glik 51'; Krychowiak 71'; Mila 73'; Milik 90+2' |

Boris Paichadze Dinamo Arena, Tbilisi
Attendance: 25,635
Referee: Paolo Tagliavento (Italy)
14 November 2014
20:45
(20:45 UTC+1)

| Germany | 4–0 | Gibraltar |
|---|---|---|
| Müller 12', 29'; Götze 38'; Santos 67' (o.g.) | Report |

Grundig-Stadion, Nuremberg
Attendance: 43,520
Referee: Alexandru Tudor (Romania)
14 November 2014
20:45
(19:45 UTC±0)

| Scotland | 1–0 | Republic of Ireland |
|---|---|---|
| Maloney 75' | Report |

Celtic Park, Glasgow
Attendance: 59,239
Referee: Milorad Mažić (Serbia)

29 March 2015
18:00
(20:00 UTC+4)

| Georgia | 0–2 | Germany |
|---|---|---|
| | Report | Reus 39'; Müller 44' |

Boris Paichadze Dinamo Arena, Tbilisi
Attendance: 51,000
Referee: Clément Turpin (France)
29 March 2015
18:00
(17:00 UTC+1)

| Scotland | 6–1 | Gibraltar |
|---|---|---|
| Maloney 18' (pen.), 34' (pen.); S. Fletcher 29', 77', 90'; Naismith 39' | Report | L. Casciaro 19' |

Hampden Park, Glasgow
Attendance: 34,255
Referee: Mattias Gestranius (Finland)
29 March 2015
20:45
(19:45 UTC+1)

| Republic of Ireland | 1–1 | Poland |
|---|---|---|
| Long 90+1' | Report | Peszko 26' |

Aviva Stadium, Dublin
Attendance: 50,500
Referee: Jonas Eriksson (Sweden)

13 June 2015
18:00
(18:00 UTC+2)

| Poland | 4–0 | Georgia |
|---|---|---|
| Milik 62'; Lewandowski 89', 90+2', 90+3' | Report |

Stadion Narodowy, Warsaw
Attendance: 56,512
Referee: Aleksei Kulbakov (Belarus)
13 June 2015
18:00
(17:00 UTC+1)

| Republic of Ireland | 1–1 | Scotland |
|---|---|---|
| Walters 38' | Report | O'Shea 47' (o.g.) |

Aviva Stadium, Dublin
Attendance: 49,063
Referee: Nicola Rizzoli (Italy)
13 June 2015
20:45
(19:45 UTC+1)

| Gibraltar | 0–7 | Germany |
|---|---|---|
| | Report | Schürrle 28', 65', 71'; Kruse 47', 81'; Gündoğan 51'; Bellarabi 57' |

Estádio Algarve, Faro/Loulé, Portugal
Attendance: 7,467
Referee: Clayton Pisani (Malta)

4 September 2015
18:00
(20:00 UTC+4)

| Georgia | 1–0 | Scotland |
|---|---|---|
| Qazaishvili 38' | Report |

Boris Paichadze Dinamo Arena, Tbilisi
Attendance: 23,000
Referee: Ovidiu Haţegan (Romania)
4 September 2015
20:45
(20:45 UTC+2)

| Germany | 3–1 | Poland |
|---|---|---|
| Müller 12'; Götze 19', 82' | Report | Lewandowski 37' |

Commerzbank-Arena, Frankfurt
Attendance: 48,500
Referee: Nicola Rizzoli (Italy)
4 September 2015
20:45
(19:45 UTC+1)

| Gibraltar | 0–4 | Republic of Ireland |
|---|---|---|
| | Report | Christie 27'; Keane 49', 51' (pen.); Long 79' |

Estádio Algarve, Faro/Loulé, Portugal
Attendance: 5,393
Referee: Marijo Strahonja (Croatia)

7 September 2015
20:45
(20:45 UTC+2)

| Poland | 8–1 | Gibraltar |
|---|---|---|
| Grosicki 8', 15'; Lewandowski 18', 29'; Milik 56', 72'; Błaszczykowski 59' (pen.); Kapustka 73' | Report | Gosling 87' |

Stadion Narodowy, Warsaw
Attendance: 27,763
Referee: Gediminas Mažeika (Lithuania)
7 September 2015
20:45
(19:45 UTC+1)

| Republic of Ireland | 1–0 | Georgia |
|---|---|---|
| Walters 69' | Report |

Aviva Stadium, Dublin
Attendance: 27,200
Referee: István Vad (Hungary)
7 September 2015
20:45
(19:45 UTC+1)

| Scotland | 2–3 | Germany |
|---|---|---|
| Hummels 28' (o.g.); McArthur 43' | Report | Müller 18', 34'; Gündoğan 54' |

Hampden Park, Glasgow
Attendance: 50,753
Referee: Björn Kuipers (Netherlands)

8 October 2015
18:00
(20:00 UTC+4)

| Georgia | 4–0 | Gibraltar |
|---|---|---|
| Vatsadze 30', 45'; Okriashvili 35' (pen.); Qazaishvili 87' | Report |

Boris Paichadze Dinamo Arena, Tbilisi
Attendance: 11,330
Referee: Serhiy Boyko (Ukraine)
8 October 2015
20:45
(19:45 UTC+1)

| Republic of Ireland | 1–0 | Germany |
|---|---|---|
| Long 70' | Report |

Aviva Stadium, Dublin
Attendance: 50,604
Referee: Carlos Velasco Carballo (Spain)
8 October 2015
20:45
(19:45 UTC+1)

| Scotland | 2–2 | Poland |
|---|---|---|
| Ritchie 45'; S. Fletcher 62' | Report | Lewandowski 3', 90+4' |

Hampden Park, Glasgow
Attendance: 49,359
Referee: Viktor Kassai (Hungary)

11 October 2015
20:45
(20:45 UTC+2)

| Germany | 2–1 | Georgia |
|---|---|---|
| Müller 50' (pen.); Kruse 79' | Report | Kankava 53' |

Red Bull Arena, Leipzig
Attendance: 43,630
Referee: Pavel Královec (Czech Republic)
11 October 2015
20:45
(19:45 UTC+1)

| Gibraltar | 0–6 | Scotland |
|---|---|---|
| | Report | C. Martin 25'; Maloney 39'; S. Fletcher 52', 56', 85'; Naismith 90+1' |

Estádio Algarve, Faro/Loulé, Portugal
Attendance: 12,401
Referee: Aleksei Kulbakov (Belarus)
11 October 2015
20:45
(20:45 UTC+2)

| Poland | 2–1 | Republic of Ireland |
|---|---|---|
| Krychowiak 13'; Lewandowski 42' | Report | Walters 16' (pen.) |

Stadion Narodowy, Warsaw
Attendance: 57,497
Referee: Cüneyt Çakır (Turkey)

== Goalscorers ==
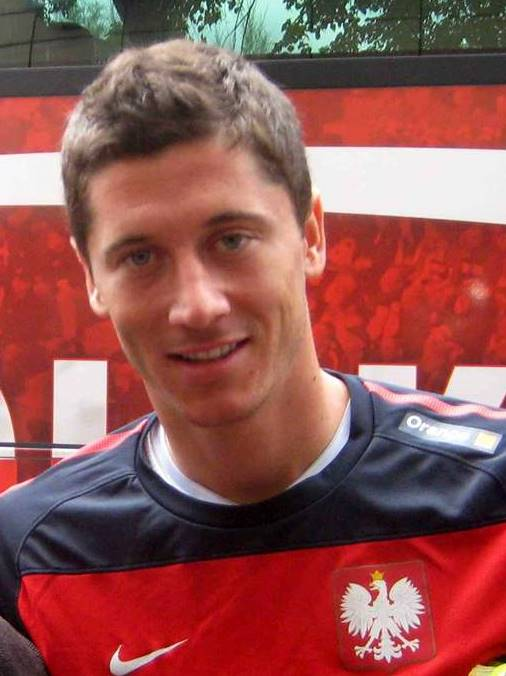
Poland's Robert Lewandowski was the group's highest goalscorer with 13 goals

There were 110 goals scored in 30 matches, for an average of 3.67 goals per match.

13 goals

- (Poland national football team) Robert Lewandowski

9 goals

- (Germany national football team) Thomas Müller

7 goals

- (Scotland national football team) Steven Fletcher

6 goals

- (Poland national football team) Arkadiusz Milik

5 goals

- (Republic of Ireland national football team) Robbie Keane
- (Scotland national football team) Shaun Maloney

4 goals

- (Poland national football team) Kamil Grosicki

3 goals

- (Georgia national football team) Tornike Okriashvili
- (Germany national football team) Mario Götze
- (Germany national football team) Max Kruse
- (Germany national football team) André Schürrle
- (Republic of Ireland national football team) Shane Long
- (Republic of Ireland national football team) Jonathan Walters
- (Scotland national football team) Steven Naismith

2 goals

- (Georgia national football team) Jaba Kankava
- (Georgia national football team) Valeri Qazaishvili
- (Georgia national football team) Mate Vatsadze
- (Germany national football team) İlkay Gündoğan
- (Poland national football team) Grzegorz Krychowiak
- (Poland national football team) Sebastian Mila
- (Republic of Ireland national football team) James McClean
- (Republic of Ireland national football team) Aiden McGeady

1 goal

- (Georgia national football team) Nikoloz Gelashvili
- (Germany national football team) Karim Bellarabi
- (Germany national football team) Toni Kroos
- (Germany national football team) Marco Reus
- (Gibraltar national football team) Lee Casciaro
- (Gibraltar national football team) Jake Gosling
- (Poland national football team) Jakub Błaszczykowski
- (Poland national football team) Kamil Glik
- (Poland national football team) Bartosz Kapustka
- (Poland national football team) Krzysztof Mączyński
- (Poland national football team) Sławomir Peszko
- (Poland national football team) Łukasz Szukała
- (Republic of Ireland national football team) Cyrus Christie
- (Republic of Ireland national football team) Wes Hoolahan
- (Republic of Ireland national football team) John O'Shea
- (Scotland national football team) Ikechi Anya
- (Scotland national football team) Chris Martin
- (Scotland national football team) James McArthur
- (Scotland national football team) Matt Ritchie

1 own goal

- (Georgia national football team) Akaki Khubutia (against Scotland)
- (Germany national football team) Mats Hummels (against Scotland)
- (Gibraltar national football team) Jordan Perez (against Republic of Ireland)
- (Gibraltar national football team) Yogan Santos (against Germany)
- (Republic of Ireland national football team) John O'Shea (against Scotland)

== Discipline ==
A player was automatically suspended for the next match for the following offences:

- Receiving a red card (red card suspensions could be extended for serious offences)
- Receiving three yellow cards in three different matches, as well as after fifth and any subsequent yellow card (yellow card suspensions were carried forward to the play-offs, but not the finals or any other future international matches)

The following suspensions were served during the qualifying matches:

| Team | Player | Offence(s) | Suspended for match(es) |
|---|---|---|---|
| Poland | Kamil Glik | (yellow card) vs Gibraltar (7 September 2014); (yellow card) vs Germany (11 October 2014); (yellow card) vs Republic of Ireland (29 March 2015) | vs Georgia (13 June 2015) |
| Republic of Ireland | James McClean | (yellow card) vs Scotland (14 November 2014); (yellow card) vs Scotland (13 June 2015); (yellow card) vs Georgia (7 September 2015) | vs Germany (8 October 2015) |
| Republic of Ireland | Glenn Whelan | (yellow card) vs Germany (14 October 2014); (yellow card) vs Scotland (13 June 2015); (yellow card) vs Georgia (7 September 2015) | vs Germany (8 October 2015) |
| Scotland | Charlie Mulgrew | (yellow card) (yellow-red card) vs Germany (7 September 2014) | vs Georgia (11 October 2014) |
| Scotland | James Morrison | (yellow card) vs Germany (7 September 2014); (yellow card) vs Georgia (11 October 2014); (yellow card) vs Germany (7 September 2015) | vs Poland (8 October 2015) |
