= Yogan Santos =

Gibraltarian footballer (born 1985)

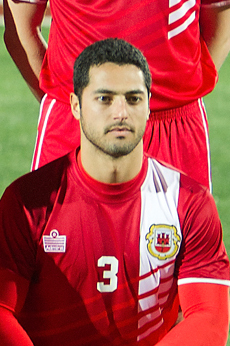
- Yogan Santos at the Victoria Stadium in March 2014

Personal information
- Full name: Yogan Santos
- Date of birth: 15 January 1985 (age 41)
- Place of birth: Gibraltar
- Position: Defender

Senior career*
Years	Team	Apps	(Gls)
2004–2007	Manchester 62		
2007–2010	Laguna		
2010–2013	Glacis United		
2013–2016	Manchester 62	18	(0)

International career
2014–2016	Gibraltar	2	(0)
- * Club domestic league appearances and goals as of 18:20, 6 March 2014 (UTC)

Yogan Santos (born 15 January 1985) is a Gibraltarian footballer who last played for Gibraltar Premier Division side Manchester 62 and the Gibraltar national team. He plays as a defender.

== International career ==
Santos was first called up to the Gibraltar senior team in February 2014 for friendlies against Faroe Islands and Estonia on 1 and 5 March 2014. He made his international début with Gibraltar on 1 March 2014 in a 4-1 loss at home to the Faroe Islands. His second appearance came a 2-0 home loss to Estonia on 5 March. He played at left back in both games.

On 14 November 2014, he scored an own goal in Gibraltar's 4–0 defeat to Germany.

=== International statistics ===
As of 14 November 2014.

National team	Season	Apps	Goals
Gibraltar	2014	5	0
Total		5	0
