= England at the FIFA World Cup =

International football delegation

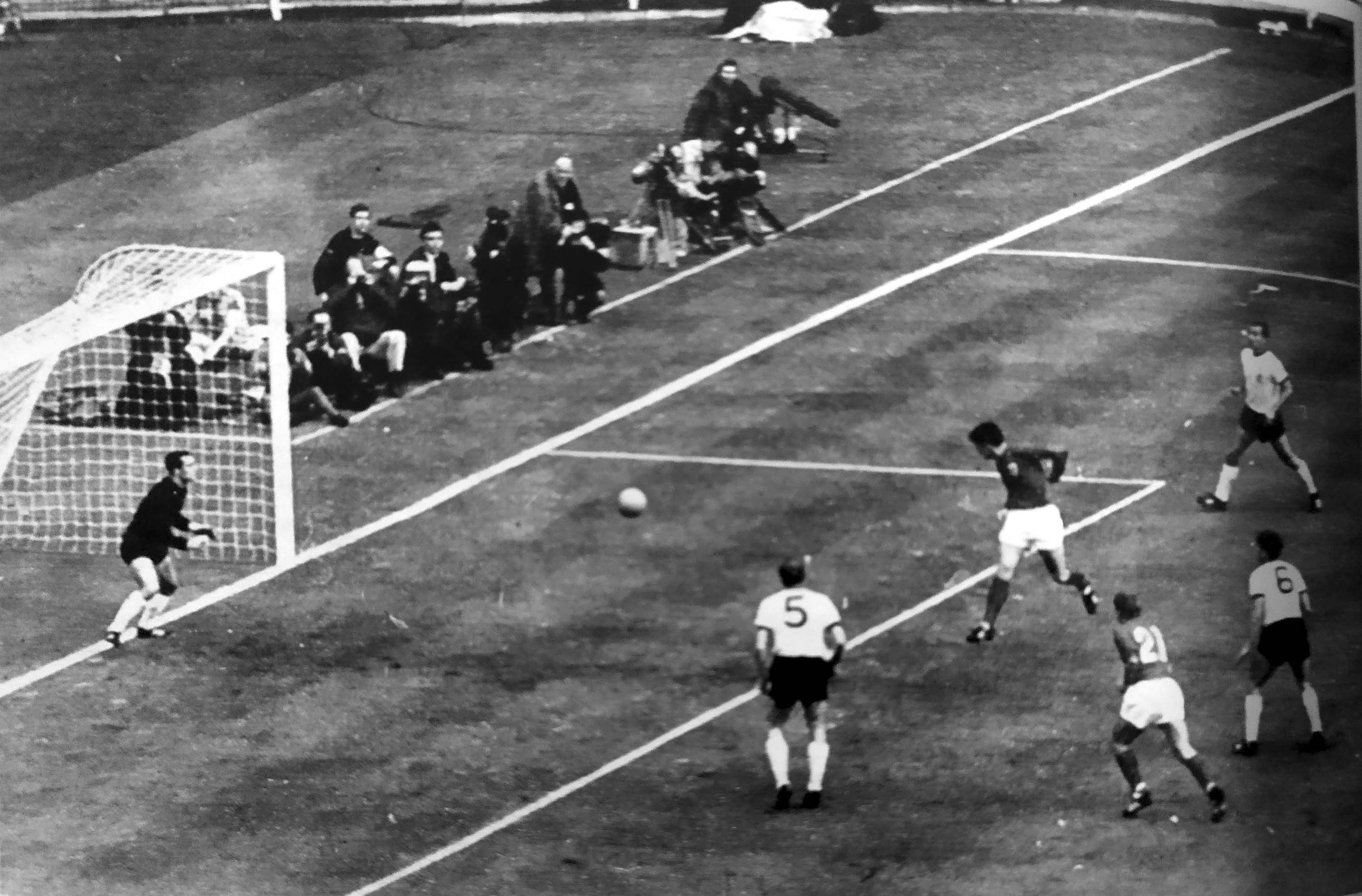
England's Geoff Hurst scoring against West Germany in the 1966 FIFA World Cup final

The England national football team did not enter the first three FIFA World Cup tournaments as they were not members of FIFA yet. (Note: England declined the chance, created and given to them when Austria withdrew from the tournament following the Anschluss, to take part in the 1938 FIFA World Cup.) They have failed to qualify for the tournament on three occasions – 1974 (West Germany), 1978 (Argentina) and 1994 (United States) – and have failed to advance from the group stage on three occasions: in 1950 (Brazil), 1958 (Sweden) and 2014 (Brazil). Their best performance is winning the cup as the host nation in 1966; they have also reached the semi-finals on another three occasions, most recently in the 2026 FIFA World Cup in North America where they achieved their second best historical performance to finish third, also resulting in their best ever World Cup finish on foreign soil. They previously finished in fourth place in 1990 in Italy, and in 2018 in Russia. The team has also reached the quarter-finals on seven other occasions.

== History ==
=== Brazil 1950 ===
England's first qualifying campaign for the FIFA World Cup doubled as the 1950 British Home Championship. The series began for England on 15 October 1949 at Ninian Park, Cardiff, against Wales. Stan Mortensen gave England the lead after 22 minutes, and seven minutes later Jackie Milburn doubled the lead. This was the first goal of Milburn's hat trick, which left England 4–0 up with 20 minutes to play. Mal Griffiths scored a consolation goal for Wales ten minutes from time, but England held on for a comfortable victory.

A month later, England welcomed Ireland to Maine Road, and it began well for the home side as Jack Rowley scored inside six minutes. England were already 6–0 up, thanks to Jack Froggatt, two for Stan Pearson, Mortensen and a second from Rowley, by the time Ireland struck back through Samuel Smyth after 55 minutes. Rowley added two more goals to his tally in the three minutes following Smyth's goal, leaving the score at 8–1 after an hour. The match ended 9–2, with Pearson scoring England's ninth, and Bobby Brennan scoring for Ireland.

In May 1950, England travelled to Hampden Park to face Scotland, who were also undefeated after their games against Ireland and Wales. With the top two from the group qualifying, both teams were guaranteed progression to the finals, and the game was solely for the honour of winning the British Home Championship, and the seeding advantage to be enjoyed upon reaching Brazil. A goal from Roy Bentley gave England the victory and top spot in the group.

England were seeded for the finals, which meant they were the favourites to progress from Group 2, which also contained Spain, Chile and the United States. They began against Chile in Rio de Janeiro and won 2–0, with goals from Mortensen and Wilf Mannion.

Their troubles began four days later when they faced the Americans in Belo Horizonte, as Joe Gaetjens scored the only goal of the match to give the United States an unlikely victory, which has gone down as one of the World Cup's greatest upsets. A myth arose that the English newspapers were so confident of an English victory that when the result was telegrammed back, they assumed a misprint and printed the score as 10–1 in England's favour. However, this has proven to be untrue.

This left England needing to beat Spain in Rio to stand any chance of qualifying. Spain's Zarra scored the only goal of the game, eliminating England from the competition.

=== Switzerland 1954 ===
England's qualifying group for the 1954 edition also constituted the 1953–54 British Home Championship. They played Wales at Ninian Park as their first match once again, and the 4–1 result was the same as four years earlier. Ivor Allchurch gave the home side a half-time lead, but England scored four within eight minutes of the restart with two each for Dennis Wilshaw and Nat Lofthouse.

At Goodison Park against Northern Ireland, Harold Hassall scored for England after ten minutes, and although Eddie McMorran equalised just before the hour mark, further goals from Hassall and Lofthouse completed a comfortable 3–1 win for England.

With the top two in the group qualifying for the finals, the final game between England and Scotland, at Hampden Park, settled nothing except the placings within the group, despite Scotland having dropped a point with a 3–3 draw at home to Wales. Allan Brown put the home side ahead after just seven minutes, but it was all square again thanks to Ivor Broadis just four minutes later. Johnny Nicholls gave England the lead for the first time just after half time, and they extended the lead with Ronnie Allen's 68th-minute goal. Jimmy Mullen added a fourth seven minutes from time, and although Willie Ormond scored a consolation for Scotland, England topped the competition for the second time in a row.

England were drawn in Group 4 for the finals, with Switzerland, Italy and Belgium. In an odd twist, unique to the 1954 tournament, England and Italy, as the two seeded teams in the group, did not have to play each other.

England's first game in Switzerland was against Belgium in Basel, and they suffered a shock as Pol Anoul put the Belgians into the lead after just five minutes. Two goals from Broadis and one from Lofthouse gave England a 3–1 lead just after the hour, but Henri Coppens hit back four minutes later before Anoul levelled the scores again. Drawn matches in the group stage went to extra time, and in the added period Lofthouse added a fourth for England, but Jimmy Dickinson scored an own goal three minutes later to leave the final score at 4–4.

England's second group game was against the hosts Switzerland in Bern. This proved to be an easier game for the Three Lions, and they scored one goal in each half, from Mullen and Wilshaw, to give them a comfortable 2–0 win. England progressed as group winners, along with Switzerland, who won a play-off against Italy.

England faced the defending champions Uruguay, the winners of Group 3, in the quarter-finals. Carlos Borges gave the South Americans the lead inside five minutes, but Lofthouse put England back on terms ten minutes later. Obdulio Varela and Juan Alberto Schiaffino scored further goals for Uruguay, but Tom Finney made the score 3–2 in the 67th minute. However, Javier Ambrois restored the two-goal lead with twelve minutes to play and England were eliminated after losing 4–2.

=== Sweden 1958 ===
For the first time, England had to play against countries other than the Home Nations to reach the Finals in Sweden. They were drawn against the Republic of Ireland and Denmark. In the qualifying round, England won three out of the four games and drew the other. Four months before the World Cup, Manchester United players Roger Byrne, Duncan Edwards, David Pegg and Tommy Taylor all died as a result of the Munich air disaster. At the finals, which is the only tournament to have seen all Home Nations take part, the Home Nations were all drawn in different groups.

England were drawn against the Soviet Union (2–2), Brazil (0–0) and Austria (2–2), who finished third in the 1954 World Cup. At the end of the group stage, Soviet Union and England each had three points, and had scored four goals and conceded four goals. This meant there was a play-off to decide the second-placed team in the group, the winner to qualify. England lost the play-off 1–0 and were thus knocked out. The only consolation for England was that they were the only team to play the eventual winners Brazil and not lose.

=== Chile 1962 ===
The third World Cup which took place in South America, saw England qualify from the group, which contained Portugal and Luxembourg, defeating Luxembourg on both occasions, and defeating Portugal at home, and drawing in Lisbon.

At the finals, England were drawn in a group with Hungary, Argentina and Bulgaria. England defeated Argentina 3–1, thanks to goals from Ron Flowers, Bobby Charlton and Jimmy Greaves, before playing out a goalless draw with Bulgaria, and a 2–1 defeat to Hungary.

England finished in second place behind Hungary and played the winners of group 3, defending champions Brazil, in the quarter-finals. Brazil scored first through Garrincha, before an equaliser for Gerry Hitchens before half time. However, second-half goals from Garrincha and Vavá meant Brazil won the game 3–1, and eliminated England from the competition. This defeat was manager Walter Winterbottom's last game in charge. Winterbottom had led England to four World Cup Finals. From May 1963, Alf Ramsey became the manager of England.

=== England 1966 ===
In the 1966 World Cup Finals, England used their home advantage and, under Ramsey, won their first, and only, World Cup title. England played all their games at Wembley Stadium in London, which became the last time that the hosts were granted this privilege. England did not concede a goal in any of their first four matches at the tournament, starting with a 0–0 draw in the opening game against former champions Uruguay, followed by 2–0 wins over France and Mexico to see them finish top of their group and qualify for the quarter-finals.

There they faced Argentina, in a very fierce game that saw Argentinian Antonio Rattín sent off by German referee Rudolf Kreitlein. Geoff Hurst scored the only goal of the game, and only his second in international football, to give England the win and a place in the semi-finals, where they faced Portugal. Two goals from Bobby Charlton gave England the lead going into the final 10 minutes of the match, before Eusebio scored from the penalty spot in the 82nd minute, the first goal England had conceded in the tournament. The final pitted England against West Germany, who took the lead in the 12th minute through Helmut Haller. Hurst equalised six minutes later, before Martin Peters gave England the lead with 12 minutes left to play; however, in the 89th minute, Wolfgang Weber levelled the scores again to take the match to extra time. In the additional period, Hurst scored twice more, the first crashing down off the crossbar before being given by linesman Tofiq Bahramov, who controversially deemed the ball to have entirely crossed the line. Hurst's three goals made him the first player to score a hat-trick in a FIFA World Cup final, a feat that was only matched in the 2022 final by French footballer Kylian Mbappé, though Mbappé's hat-trick included two penalties.

=== Mexico 1970 ===
1970 saw the first World Cup finals to take place in North America and England qualified automatically for the tournament by winning the 1966 FIFA World Cup. England were drawn in a group with Romania, former world champions Brazil and Czechoslovakia. Each of the matches only saw one goal, with England defeating Romania and Czechoslovakia, and losing to Brazil, progressing them to the quarter-final second in their group. The quarter-final saw a repeat of the 1966 final, with England playing West Germany. England were hampered by the fact that first-choice goalkeeper Gordon Banks was ill, and Peter Bonetti played instead. England led 2–0 with goals by Alan Mullery and Martin Peters, but in the 70th minute, Franz Beckenbauer pulled one goal back for West Germany.

After Beckenbauer's goal, Ramsey substituted Bobby Charlton, who overtook Billy Wright as England's most capped player ever, with caps totalling 106. Uwe Seeler equalised for the Germans in the 81st minute, thereby taking the game into extra time. During extra time, Gerd Müller scored the winning goal for West Germany which saw the German side win 3–2. This turned out to be Charlton's last game for England.

=== West Germany 1974 ===
For the first time, England did not qualify for a World Cup. In a group with Olympic champions Poland and Wales, England could not overtake Poland. After only drawing at home to Wales 1–1 and losing 2–0 in Poland, England had to beat Poland at home, whilst Poland only needed to draw. Poland managed to withstand England's attacks in the first half. Poland took the lead in the 57th minute with a goal from Jan Domarski.

England equalised six minutes later, with a penalty converted by Allan Clarke. England were unable to score any more goals with goalkeeper Jan Tomaszewski keeping England at bay. Brian Clough had previously called Tomaszewski a "clown". Poland took this good form to the finals and ended in third place. After failing to qualify, Alf Ramsey resigned from his post and after a time, where Ramsey and his predecessor had lasted a total of 29 years, no manager was able to last in the job for longer than eight years. This ended when Bobby Robson became England manager.

=== Argentina 1978 ===
England also did not qualify for the fourth World Cup which took place in South America. This time, England were denied by Italy, who had scored three more goals than England after both teams finished on the same points. Goals scored dictated who qualified after the head-to-head record between the two sides finished the same, following a 2–0 home win for each team. The lower-ranked teams in the group were Finland and Luxembourg, but the size of the wins against them proved to be decisive. Nevertheless, Ron Greenwood was given a second chance in charge of England, after taking the role in 1977.

=== Spain 1982 ===
1982 saw the first time where the European Qualifying Rounds were divided into groups of five teams, where the top two teams qualify for the World Cup. Greenwood used his second chance and took England to Spain by finishing second behind Hungary and above Romania, Switzerland and Norway.

At the finals, England won all three group games for the first time, defeating France 3–1, with a brace from Bryan Robson, before beating Czechoslovakia 2–0, with a Jozef Barmos own goal, and World Cup newcomers Kuwait 1–0, with a goal from Trevor Francis.

The next round saw a second group stage consisting of three teams, a first-time event at the World Cup. England drew with West Germany 0–0 and after the Germans beat Spain 2–1, England then had to beat Spain with a two-goal difference to progress to the next round. England, however, only managed a 0–0 draw against the Spanish. England remained unbeaten at the end of the tournament. After the World Cup, Ron Greenwood's time as England manager ended, and he was replaced by Bobby Robson.

=== Mexico 1986 ===
1986 saw the second World Cup to take place in Mexico. England qualified by winning four games and drawing four times in their group matches against Northern Ireland, who qualified in second place, Romania, Finland and Turkey.

In Mexico, England lost their opening game to Portugal 1–0 and could only manage a goalless draw against Morocco, when Ray Wilkins was sent off. The final group game, however, saw England beat Poland 3–0, with Gary Lineker scoring a hat-trick. This result took England to second place, behind Morocco.

England then also beat Paraguay 3–0 in the round of 16. In the quarter-finals, England renewed their rivalry with Argentina in a game that has become notorious for the Argentina goals, both scored by Diego Maradona. Maradona's first goal, known as the Hand of God, was illegal as he used his hand to punch the ball into the net. However, the referee missed this infringement and ruled that the goal should stand. Maradona then made the score 2–0, famously dribbling from inside Argentina's half and around several English players before scoring. Lineker pulled back the score to 2–1, but England were unable to equalise and were eliminated. Nevertheless, Lineker finished with the Golden Boot by scoring six goals and thereby becoming England's first Golden Boot winner.

=== Italy 1990 ===
By winning three and drawing three, England qualified for Italia '90, the second World Cup to be held in Italy, scoring ten goals and conceding none. Although unbeaten through qualification, England still finished second to Sweden, whom they drew with twice. England profited from Romania's 3–1 win over Denmark, who, had they won, would have qualified as the third-best second-placed team. West Germany and England were able to qualify for Italia '90 as the best second-placed teams in the groups with four teams.

England's group games were scheduled to be played on the islands of Sardinia and Sicily. Joining them in group F were European champions Netherlands, the Republic of Ireland and Egypt. After opening the tournament with a 1–1 draw against Ireland and a 0–0 draw against the Dutch, England then beat Egypt 1–0. This was Egypt's first appearance since the 1934 World Cup. England won the group with four points.

In the next round, England had to play Belgium. The game went to extra time, and in the 119th minute, David Platt scored the winning goal. England also had to play extra time against Cameroon in the quarter-finals. Cameroon were the first African team to have reached the quarter-finals. England opened the scoring through David Platt, but Cameroon quickly turned around the game to lead 2–1. Lineker subsequently won and scored a penalty in the 83rd minute to ensure the game went to extra time. He then scored a second penalty, to see England reach the semi-finals.

In the semi-finals, England met West Germany. There was no separating the two teams after 90 minutes, which made England the first team to have played extra time in three successive World Cup games. There was also no separating the two teams after extra time, thereby taking the game to penalties.

Although English goalkeeper Peter Shilton dived the right way for every penalty, he was unable to save any. German goalkeeper Bodo Illgner, having failed to save any of England's first three penalties, saved England's fourth penalty, taken by Stuart Pearce. Olaf Thon then scored for Germany, meaning that England's Chris Waddle would have to score his fifth penalty and hope that Shilton saved the Germans' fifth penalty. However, Waddle's penalty missed completely, going high over the crossbar, thereby resulting in England's being knocked out of the competition. The match for third place between England and Italy saw England lose their only game of the tournament in normal time. Even though this was England's best finish since the 1966 World Cup, Bobby Robson's time as England manager had come to an end.

=== United States 1994 ===
For the 1994 World Cup in the United States, under the leadership of new manager Graham Taylor, England surprisingly did not qualify for the tournament. In a group with six teams, England lost to Norway and the Netherlands, finishing third above Poland, Turkey and San Marino.

England went into their final game with San Marino knowing they would need a seven-goal victory and for Poland to beat the Netherlands in the other match in order to qualify. In the game against San Marino, Davide Gualtieri scored against England after nine seconds, taking the lead for the outsiders. England went on to win 7–1, which was too small a goal margin. Additionally, despite the half-time score between the Poles and the Dutch being 1–1, the Dutch went on to win 3–1, meaning that however many goals England scored, they could still not qualify. Taylor's tenure in charge ended and he was replaced by Terry Venables, who left after England lost the semi-final of Euro 1996, hosted in England.

=== France 1998 ===
After missing out on the World Cup in 1994, England, managed by Glenn Hoddle, qualified for the World Cup in France. England were drawn in Group 2 of UEFA qualifying with Italy, Poland, Georgia and Moldova. England beat Poland, Georgia and Moldova both home and away, but a home defeat to Italy in their fourth match meant they went into the final qualifier at the Stadio Olimpico in Rome just a point ahead of the Azzurri and only needing a draw to qualify automatically; defeat would see them have to navigate a play-off to secure qualification. The match finished as a goalless draw and England finished top of the group.

At the finals in France, England played in Group G. England defeated Tunisia 2–0 in the first game, with goals from Alan Shearer and Paul Scholes. Their second match saw England lose 2–1 to Romania; despite an 81st-minute equaliser from Michael Owen, Dan Petrescu scored a winner shortly before injury time. In their final group game, England defeated Colombia 2–0 in the decisive match, thanks to goals from midfielders Darren Anderton and David Beckham. England finished second in Group G, which saw them qualify for the last 16 phase, and play the winner of 1998 FIFA World Cup Group H, Argentina.

In a fiery game containing six yellow cards and two penalties, David Beckham was controversially sent off in the 47th minute for what many felt was at most a yellow card offence, knocking over Diego Simeone. Gabriel Batistuta opened the scoring from the penalty spot in the fifth minute of the game, before an equaliser also from the spot by Alan Shearer four minutes later. England took the lead through Owen, in the 16th minute. Argentina drew level through Javier Zanetti in injury time of the first half.

The game finished 2–2, and, as neither team were able to find a winner in extra time, penalties were needed to decide the team that qualified to the next round. While David Seaman did save one penalty, Argentine goalkeeper Carlos Roa managed to save two, including the vital one from David Batty, thereby knocking England out of the World Cup. Beckham subsequently received death threats and was sent bullets in the post.

=== South Korea/Japan 2002 ===
In 2002 the World Cup took place in Asia for the first time. England, under its first ever foreign manager in Swedish Sven-Göran Eriksson, were able to qualify for the tournament. England were drawn in Group 9, alongside Germany, Finland, Greece and Albania. In the last ever game in the original Wembley Stadium, (which closed after the match) England played Germany, losing 1–0, the only goal scored by Dietmar Hamann. The match was the last under the management of Kevin Keegan, who resigned at the end of the match, and was replaced by Eriksson. By beating Germany 5–1 in Munich, England's qualifying campaign was revitalised, and they qualified automatically, by drawing 2–2 with Greece. Germany, who could only draw 0–0 with Finland, had to play a play-off game against Ukraine, with England qualifying ahead winning the group.

In Japan, England had to play against Eriksson's homeland, Sweden, and both settled out for a 1–1 draw. England and Beckham gained a measure of revenge for their previous 1998 defeat in defeating Argentina 1–0, thanks to a Beckham penalty. However, England could only manage a disappointing 0–0 draw against Nigeria, meaning that although they were able to qualify for the second round, where they were to play Denmark, they had qualified as runners up. This meant that they were destined to meet favourites Brazil in the quarter-finals if they progressed.

England played Denmark in the round of 16 defeating Denmark 3–0, thanks to goals from Michael Owen, Rio Ferdinand, and Emile Heskey. England played four-time World Cup winners and 1998 runners-up Brazil in the quarter-finals. Despite leading through a Michael Owen goal, a mistake by David Seaman saw England lose 2–1, and Brazil won their fourth World Cup match against England, and went on to win the tournament.

=== Germany 2006 ===
England were drawn into Group 6 of European qualifying for the 2006 World Cup. The group featured other home nations in Wales, and Northern Ireland, as well as Poland (who had eliminated England the last time the World Cup took place in Germany), Azerbaijan and Austria. England won eight of the 10 games, and qualified as group winners, in front of Poland, despite drawing to Austria in Vienna, and losing to Northern Ireland in Belfast.

In Germany, however, England were less convincing. England played in Group B, alongside Paraguay, Trinidad and Tobago, and Sweden. England started with a 1–0 win against Paraguay; which was won thanks to a third-minute own goal. The second game against first time qualifiers Trinidad and Tobago saw England have to wait until the 83rd minute to take the lead, when Peter Crouch opened the scoring with a goal many felt was illegal, and the second goal of the game coming in added time from Steven Gerrard. The last group game saw England play against Sweden, where an eventual 2–2 draw saw them qualify for the next round as group winners, thereby avoiding playing hosts Germany.

In the last 16 stage, a free kick from David Beckham gave England a 1–0 win against Ecuador and reach the quarter-finals, where they faced Portugal. The game finished goalless after Wayne Rooney was sent off, and England once again were knocked out on penalties and Portuguese goalkeeper Ricardo became the first goalkeeper to save three penalties in a penalty shoot-out. Ricardo saved from Frank Lampard, Steven Gerrard and Jamie Carragher; the only England player to convert his penalty was Owen Hargreaves. Portugal won the shoot-out 3–1, despite misses from Petit and Hugo Viana. This game was also Eriksson's final match as England manager.

=== South Africa 2010 ===
Qualification for the first African World Cup went successfully for new England manager Fabio Capello, after previous manager Steve McClaren was unable to secure qualification to the Euro 2008. By winning nine times and losing only to Ukraine, England qualified ahead of Croatia, Belarus, Kazakhstan and Andorra. England's group was seen as a favourable one, containing comparatively much weaker teams. However, England opened the tournament with a 1–1 draw against the United States, thanks to a major error by goalkeeper Robert Green. They then drew 0–0 against Algeria and were booed off the field by their own fans, drawing the ire of striker Wayne Rooney. England eventually qualified for the next round by beating Slovenia 1–0, but only as runners up to the United States, thereby meaning they would be drawn against favourites Germany.

In the second round match, Germany took the lead after 20 minutes after goalkeeper Manuel Neuer played the ball down the pitch to Miroslav Klose, who opened the scoring. The score became 2–0 to Germany after 32 minutes. Shortly after, England defender Matthew Upson scored a header. Later, Frank Lampard had a shot at goal disallowed despite having been shown to cross the line. This was confirmed on replays. Neuer subsequently admitted he knew the ball had crossed the line, but had decided to deceive the referee. The German media reported it was "revenge for Wembley", while the English media criticised FIFA's refusal to implement goal-line technology. Ironically, despite this earlier opposition to new goal-line technology, Sepp Blatter later said that it should be introduced after a Ukrainian goal against England at UEFA Euro 2012 had been ruled out. As England tried to equalise, Germany used this to their advantage and scored two more goals. England's 4–1 defeat was their heaviest in the World Cup.

=== Brazil 2014 ===
Under Roy Hodgson, who had replaced Fabio Capello before Euro 2012 after a disagreement between Capello and The FA, England qualified for the second World Cup to be held in Brazil. Ukraine were again one of the opponents in the qualifying rounds. The other opponents included Montenegro, Poland, Moldova and San Marino. After winning six games and drawing four, England qualified unbeaten.

The draw for the finals pitched England against Italy and Uruguay, both former world champions, which meant that it was the first time three previous winners were drawn in the same group, along with Costa Rica. England lost to Italy and Uruguay, and were knocked out after two games because Costa Rica pulled a shocking upset on both Uruguay and Italy. The final match against Costa Rica finished as a goalless draw. Their tally of one point from three matches was their lowest total in the group stage of a World Cup.

=== Russia 2018 ===
England played in UEFA Group F in qualification for the 2018 World Cup, in a group of six with Slovakia, Slovenia, Scotland, Lithuania and Malta, with only the winner of the group guaranteed qualification. England went into the qualification process under manager Sam Allardyce, only for Allardyce to leave the post after just one game due to controversy regarding discussing breaking FIFA rules.

Under Allardyce's replacement, Gareth Southgate, England went undefeated throughout qualification, winning eight matches out of 10, drawing with Slovenia 0–0 in Ljubljana, and drawing 2–2 with Scotland in Glasgow thanks to a 90th-minute equaliser from Harry Kane. This was the third successive major tournament for which England qualified undefeated.

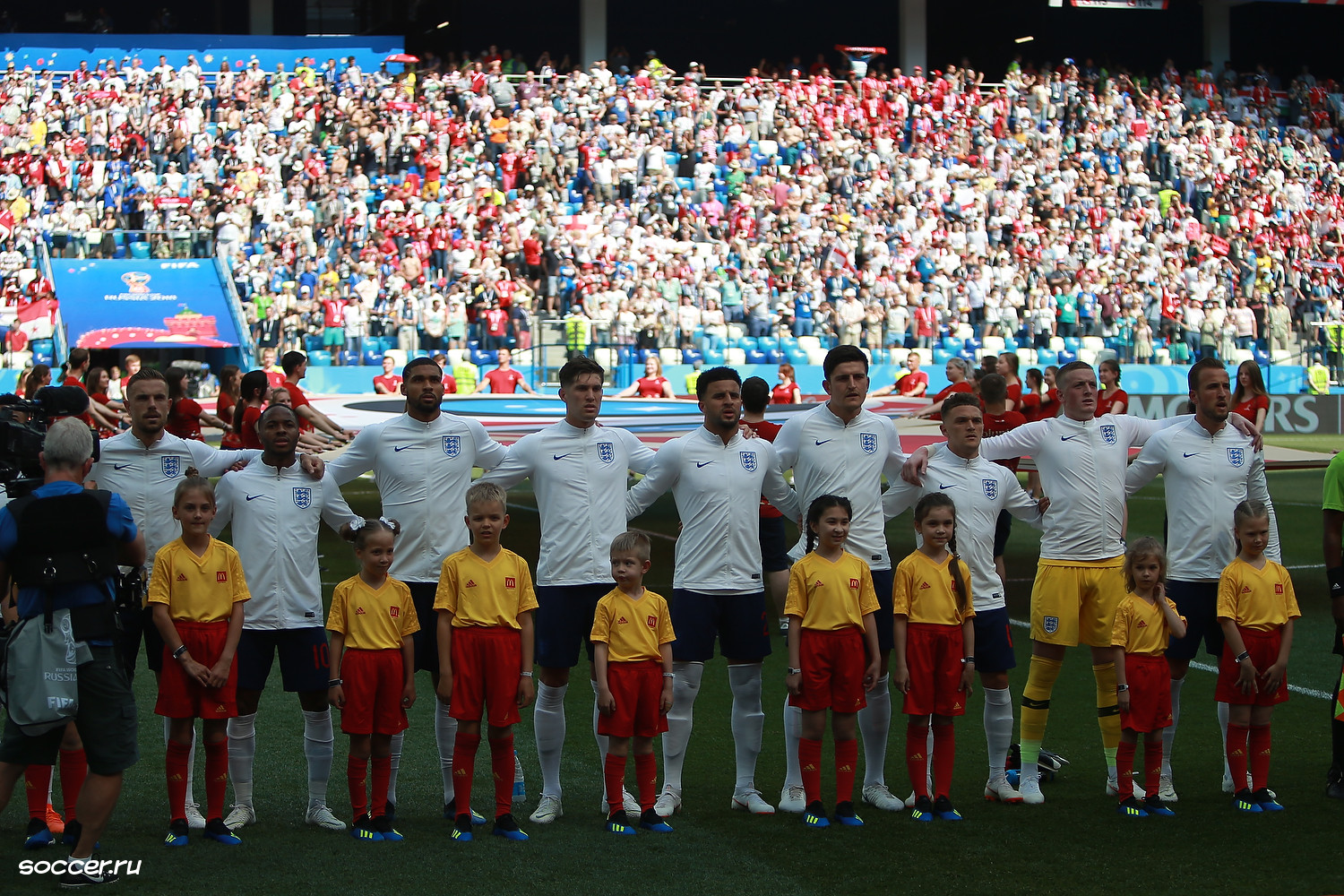
England national team at the 2018 World Cup in Russia

England began in group G against Tunisia. The game started well for England with a goal from Harry Kane in the 11th minute. Tunisia equalised through Sassi from the penalty spot in the 35th minute following a foul by Kyle Walker. Some controversy followed as various potential offences against Kane inside the penalty area were ignored by the referee and no VAR checks were carried out. England persevered and scored a second goal in the 91st minute, again by Kane, resulting in a 2–1 victory.

In the second match, England surpassed their record for goals scored in a World Cup match by beating Panama 6–1. Jesse Lingard scored the third goal, John Stones scored the first and fourth goals and Kane scored a hat-trick.

In the final group match, England lost 1–0 to Belgium. Adnan Januzaj scored the sole goal of the game, but both teams fielded reserve teams and England made nine changes. Before the game, media outlets stated that a loss could become beneficial, as the winner would be in the half of the draw with four of the top seven sides in the world. (Note: Belgium were ranked third, and Germany had already been eliminated. Of the countries from the top 10 of the FIFA World Rankings, only Switzerland (6) and Spain (10) were in the loser's half of the draw.) The result meant England finished second in the group, setting up a last 16 clash with the Group H winners, Colombia.

England played their last 16 match in the Otkritie Arena, Moscow, with the same team as against Tunisia. Kane scored his sixth goal of the tournament, and the third penalty, after once again being fouled in the box from a corner, as against Panama. The score remained at 1–0 until stoppage time, when a header from Yerry Mina beat Jordan Pickford to take the game to extra time. Neither team scored again, and the match went to a penalty shoot-out, which England won 4–3. It was the first time England had won a World Cup penalty shoot-out. (Note: England had previously lost World Cup penalty shoot-outs in 1990 to West Germany, in 1998 to Argentina and in 2006 to Portugal. In competitive matches, England's penalty shoot-out record before the match against Colombia was one win and six losses, with their only win against Spain in 1996.) The match was notable for the heated atmosphere in which it was played, with eight yellow cards being shown. (Note: A total of six yellow cards for Colombia, and two for England.)

England played against Sweden in their quarter-final at Cosmos Arena, Samara on 7 July 2018. They won 2–0, with defender Harry Maguire scoring his first England goal, a header scored from a corner, and Dele Alli a second header from close range. This sent them through to the semi-finals, their first since 1990 and third overall at the World Cup. They lost 2–1 after extra time to Croatia in the semi-finals. England lost again to Belgium in the match for third place, following goals from Thomas Meunier and Eden Hazard. They finished fourth, equalling their best result since 1966.

England scored nine goals from set-pieces in the tournament, the most by a team in a single World Cup tournament since 1966.

=== Qatar 2022 ===
In qualifying for the 2022 FIFA World Cup, England were drawn in UEFA Group I along with Poland, Hungary, Albania, Andorra and San Marino.

The qualifying process began in March 2021, with England winning each of their first five matches: 5–0 at home to San Marino, 2–0 away to Albania, 2–1 at home to Poland, 4–0 away to Hungary and 4–0 at home to Andorra. They were then held to a 1–1 draw in the return match against Poland at the Kazimierz Górski National Stadium in Warsaw, substitute Damian Szymański scoring a 92nd-minute equaliser after Harry Kane had given England the lead midway through the second half. They returned to winning ways in October 2021 with a 5–0 away win over Andorra, before another draw at home to Hungary a few days later. Nevertheless, a 5–0 win at home to Albania in November 2021 meant England needed just a point in their final World Cup qualifier away to San Marino, then the bottom-ranked side in the world rankings, to win the group and secure automatic qualification. England beat San Marino 10–0, their record victory in a competitive match, to finish top of the group, six points clear of Poland.

The final draw for the World Cup took place on 1 April 2022 at the Doha Exhibition and Convention Center. They were the seeded team in Group B, into which they were drawn with Iran, the United States and the winners of UEFA Play-off Path A, later confirmed to be Wales.

England won their first group match against Iran 6–2, followed by a 0–0 draw with the United States, and a 3–0 win against Wales. As a result, England finished in first place in Group B.

England's beat their first knockout-stage opponents Senegal 3–0, gaining them a place in the quarter-finals where they faced France. France's Aurelien Tchouameni opened the scoring, but England equalised in the second half through Harry Kane. Twelve minutes before the end of normal time, Olivier Giroud put France 2-1 up, however shortly afterwards England were provided a chance to equalise from the penalty spot after a foul on Mason Mount. Kane took the penalty but missed, putting it over the crossbar. England lost the match 2–1 and were eliminated. England were named as the winners of the FIFA Fair Play Trophy. Despite the quarter-final elimination, this tournament set a new record for the most goals scored by England in a World Cup (13).

=== Canada/Mexico/United States 2026 ===
England were drawn into Group K in the UEFA FIFA World Cup qualification competition alongside Albania, Andorra, Latvia and Serbia for a final qualification place in the 2026 FIFA World Cup finals tournament in Canada, Mexico and the United States.

The qualification process began in March 2025 under newly appointed head coach Thomas Tuchel. England won every group stage game and finished top of Group K, conceding no goals in the process and securing qualification for the 2026 World Cup. Harry Kane was England's top scorer in the qualifiers with eight goals.

England were drawn into Group L of the 2026 World Cup finals alongside Croatia, Ghana and Panama. Their World Cup campaign began on 17 June 2026 against Croatia at the AT&T Stadium. England won the match 4–2, with goals from Harry Kane, Jude Bellingham and Marcus Rashford. This was followed by a goalless draw against Ghana in their second group game on 23 June at the Gillette Stadium. Their third and final group match was against Panama on 27 June at the MetLife Stadium. England won the match 2–0 with second half goals from Jude Bellingham and Harry Kane.

England finished at the top of Group L and advanced to the knockout stage. England were drawn to play against DR Congo, who finished third in Group K, on 1 July at the Mercedes-Benz Stadium, Atlanta, in the round of 32. This would be the first meeting between the two sides. Despite DR Congo taking an early lead through Brian Cipenga, England won the match 2–1 through late goals from Harry Kane.

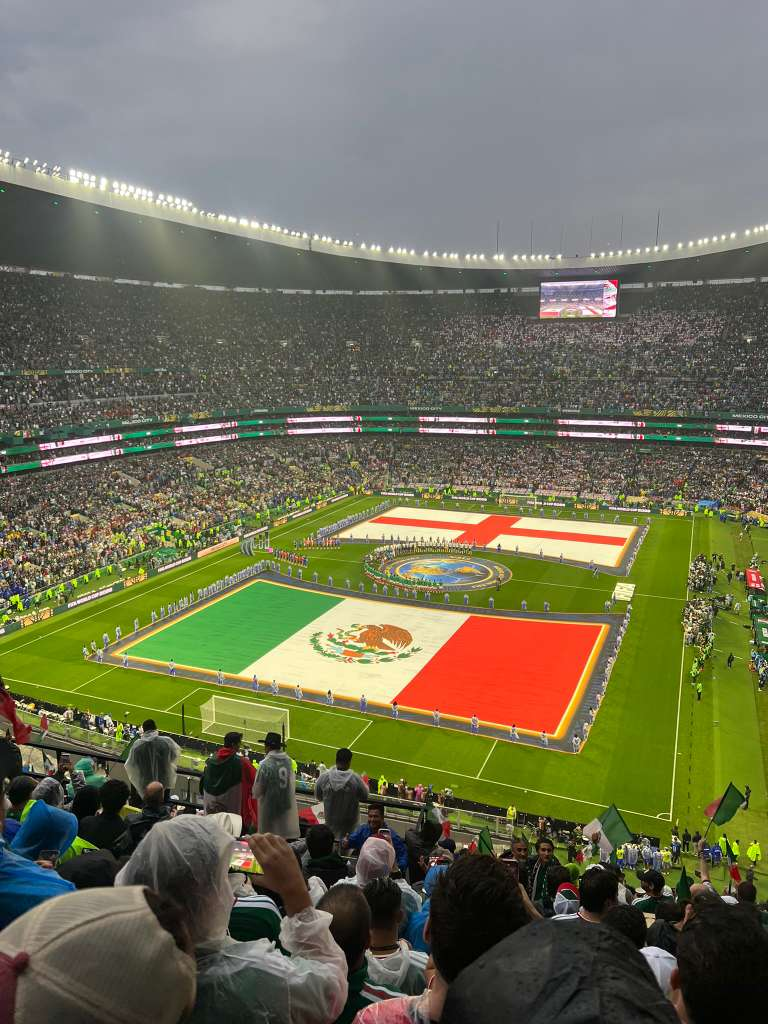
Pre-match at England's Round of 16 match against Mexico at Estadio Azteca in Mexico City on 5 July 2026. England won 3–2 to advance to the quarter-finals.

England advanced to the Round of 16 where they were drawn to play against Mexico on 6 July at the Estadio Azteca, Mexico City. England won the match 3–2, through two goals from Jude Bellingham and a second-half penalty from Harry Kane. England defender Jarell Quansah received a red card for a high challenge on Jesús Gallardo and was consequently suspended for two matches, a sanction which The FA considered appealing. In the quarter-finals, England were drawn to play against Norway on 11 July at the Hard Rock Stadium. England won 2–1 after extra time, with Bellingham scoring both goals and Andreas Schjelderup scoring for Norway. England lost their semi-final 2–1 to Argentina on 15 July at the Mercedes-Benz Stadium, following goals from Anthony Gordon (England), Enzo Fernández and Lautaro Martínez (both Argentina).

Following their loss in the semi-finals, England played the third place play-off against France on 18 July at the Hard Rock Stadium. England won the match 6–4, including goals from Declan Rice, Ezri Konsa and Jude Bellingham, as well as a hat-trick from Bukayo Saka that was completed with a penalty. This was the highest-scoring third-place match ever at a World Cup, beating the previous record of France 6–3 West Germany in 1958. With this win, England finished in third place at the 2026 FIFA World Cup. This was England's best World Cup result since 1966, as well as their first medal since they won the tournament. Jointly with France, England scored the most goals in the tournament (20), setting a new tournament record for England. This was also the greatest number of goals scored by one team in a World Cup since the 1958 World Cup, when France scored 23.

== Record at the FIFA World Cup ==
=== Overall record ===
FIFA World Cup finals record										Qualification record						Manager(s)
Year	Round	Pos	Pld	W	D*	L	GF	GA	Squad	Pld	W	D	L	GF	GA	Manager(s)
(Uruguay) 1930	Not a FIFA member									Not a FIFA member						None
(Italy) 1934	Not a FIFA member									Not a FIFA member						None
(France) 1938	Not a FIFA member									Not a FIFA member						None
(Brazil) 1950	Group stage	8th	3	1	0	2	2	2	Squad	3	3	0	0	14	3	Winterbottom
(Switzerland) 1954	Quarter-finals	7th	3	1	1	1	8	8	Squad	3	3	0	0	11	4	Winterbottom
(Sweden) 1958	Group stage	11th	4	0	3	1	4	5	Squad	4	3	1	0	15	5	Winterbottom
(Chile) 1962	Quarter-finals	8th	4	1	1	2	5	6	Squad	4	3	1	0	16	2	Winterbottom
(England) 1966	Champions	1st	6	5	1	0	11	3	Squad	Qualified as hosts						Ramsey
(Mexico) 1970	Quarter-finals	8th	4	2	0	2	4	4	Squad	Qualified as defending champions						Ramsey
(West Germany) 1974	Did not qualify									4	1	2	1	3	4	Ramsey
(Argentina) 1978	Did not qualify									6	5	0	1	15	4	Revie
(Spain) 1982	Second group stage	6th	5	3	2	0	6	1	Squad	8	4	1	3	13	8	Greenwood
(Mexico) 1986	Quarter-finals	8th	5	2	1	2	7	3	Squad	8	4	4	0	21	2	Robson
(Italy) 1990	Fourth place	4th	7	3	3	1	8	6	Squad	6	3	3	0	10	0	Robson
(United States) 1994	Did not qualify									10	5	3	2	26	9	Taylor
(France) 1998	Round of 16	9th	4	2	1	1	7	4	Squad	8	6	1	1	15	2	Hoddle
(South Korea) (Japan) 2002	Quarter-finals	6th	5	2	2	1	6	3	Squad	8	5	2	1	16	6	Eriksson
(Germany) 2006	Quarter-finals	7th	5	3	2	0	6	2	Squad	10	8	1	1	17	5	Eriksson
(South Africa) 2010	Round of 16	13th	4	1	2	1	3	5	Squad	10	9	0	1	34	6	Capello
(Brazil) 2014	Group stage	26th	3	0	1	2	2	4	Squad	10	6	4	0	31	4	Hodgson
(Russia) 2018	Fourth place	4th	7	3	1	3	12	8	Squad	10	8	2	0	18	3	Southgate
(Qatar) 2022	Quarter-finals	6th	5	3	1	1	13	4	Squad	10	8	2	0	39	3	Southgate
(Canada) (Mexico) (United States) 2026	Third place	3rd	8	6	1	1	20	12	Squad	8	8	0	0	22	0	Tuchel
(Spain) (Portugal) (Morocco) 2030	To be determined									To be determined						
(Saudi Arabia) 2034	To be determined									To be determined						
Total	1 title	17/23	81	37	23	21	118	76	—	120	84	25	11	297	67	—
Champions Runners-up Third place Fourth place *Draws include knockout matches decided on penalty kicks. **Red border colour indicates tournament was held on home soil.

England's World Cup record
First match	England 2–0 Chile (25 June 1950; Rio de Janeiro, Brazil)
Biggest win	England 6–1 Panama (24 June 2018; Nizhny Novgorod, Russia)
Biggest defeat	Germany 4–1 England (27 June 2010; Bloemfontein, South Africa)
Best result	Champions in 1966
Worst result	Group stage in 1950, 1958 and 2014

=== By match ===
Year	Round	Opponent	Score	England scorers
(Brazil) 1950	Group 2	Chile	2–0	Mortensen, Mannion
(Brazil) 1950	Group 2	United States	0–1	—
(Brazil) 1950	Group 2	Spain	0–1	—
(Switzerland) 1954	Group 4	Belgium	4–4 (a.e.t.)	Broadis (2), Lofthouse (2)
(Switzerland) 1954	Group 4	Switzerland	2–0	Mullen, Wilshaw
(Switzerland) 1954	Quarter-final	Uruguay	2–4	Lofthouse, Finney
(Sweden) 1958	Group 4	Soviet Union	2–2	Kevan, Finney
(Sweden) 1958	Group 4	Brazil	0–0	—
(Sweden) 1958	Group 4	Austria	2–2	Haynes, Kevan
(Sweden) 1958	Play-off	Soviet Union	0–1	—
(Chile) 1962	Group 4	Hungary	1–2	Flowers
(Chile) 1962	Group 4	Argentina	3–1	Flowers, Charlton, Greaves
(Chile) 1962	Group 4	Bulgaria	0–0	—
(Chile) 1962	Quarter-final	Brazil	1–3	Hitchens
(England) 1966	Group 1	Uruguay	0–0	—
(England) 1966	Group 1	Mexico	2–0	Charlton, Hunt
(England) 1966	Group 1	France	2–0	Hunt (2)
(England) 1966	Quarter-final	Argentina	1–0	Hurst
(England) 1966	Semi-final	Portugal	2–1	Charlton (2)
(England) 1966	Final	West Germany	4–2 (a.e.t.)	Hurst (3), Peters
(Mexico) 1970	Group 3	Romania	1–0	Hurst
(Mexico) 1970	Group 3	Brazil	0–1	—
(Mexico) 1970	Group 3	Czechoslovakia	1–0	Clarke
(Mexico) 1970	Quarter-final	West Germany	2–3 (a.e.t.)	Mullery, Peters
(Spain) 1982	Group 4	France	3–1	Robson (2), Mariner
(Spain) 1982	Group 4	Czechoslovakia	2–0	Francis, Barmoš (o.g.)
(Spain) 1982	Group 4	Kuwait	1–0	Francis
(Spain) 1982	Group B	West Germany	0–0	—
(Spain) 1982	Group B	Spain	0–0	—
(Mexico) 1986	Group F	Portugal	0–1	—
(Mexico) 1986	Group F	Morocco	0–0	—
(Mexico) 1986	Group F	Poland	3–0	Lineker (3)
(Mexico) 1986	Round of 16	Paraguay	3–0	Lineker (2), Beardsley
(Mexico) 1986	Quarter-final	Argentina	1–2	Lineker
(Italy) 1990	Group F	Republic of Ireland	1–1	Lineker
(Italy) 1990	Group F	Netherlands	0–0	—
(Italy) 1990	Group F	Egypt	1–0	Wright
(Italy) 1990	Round of 16	Belgium	1–0 (a.e.t.)	Platt
(Italy) 1990	Quarter-final	Cameroon	3–2 (a.e.t.)	Platt, Lineker (2)
(Italy) 1990	Semi-final	West Germany	1–1 (a.e.t.) (Note: England lost the penalty shoot-out)	Lineker
(Italy) 1990	Match for third place	Italy	1–2	Platt
(France) 1998	Group G	Tunisia	2–0	Shearer, Scholes
(France) 1998	Group G	Romania	1–2	Owen
(France) 1998	Group G	Colombia	2–0	Anderton, Beckham
(France) 1998	Round of 16	Argentina	2–2 (a.e.t.)	Shearer, Owen
(South Korea) (Japan) 2002	Group F	Sweden	1–1	Campbell
(South Korea) (Japan) 2002	Group F	Argentina	1–0	Beckham
(South Korea) (Japan) 2002	Group F	Nigeria	0–0	—
(South Korea) (Japan) 2002	Round of 16	Denmark	3–0	Ferdinand, Owen, Heskey
(South Korea) (Japan) 2002	Quarter-final	Brazil	1–2	Owen
(Germany) 2006	Group B	Paraguay	1–0	Gamarra (o.g.)
(Germany) 2006	Group B	Trinidad and Tobago	2–0	Crouch, Gerrard
(Germany) 2006	Group B	Sweden	2–2	Cole, Gerrard
(Germany) 2006	Round of 16	Ecuador	1–0	Beckham
(Germany) 2006	Quarter-final	Portugal	0–0 (a.e.t.)	—
(South Africa) 2010	Group C	United States	1–1	Gerrard
(South Africa) 2010	Group C	Algeria	0–0	—
(South Africa) 2010	Group C	Slovenia	1–0	Defoe
(South Africa) 2010	Round of 16	Germany	1–4	Upson
(Brazil) 2014	Group D	Italy	1–2	Sturridge
(Brazil) 2014	Group D	Uruguay	1–2	Rooney
(Brazil) 2014	Group D	Costa Rica	0–0	—
(Russia) 2018	Group G	Tunisia	2–1	Kane (2)
(Russia) 2018	Group G	Panama	6–1	Stones (2), Kane (3), Lingard
(Russia) 2018	Group G	Belgium	0–1	—
(Russia) 2018	Round of 16	Colombia	1–1 (a.e.t.) (Note: England won the penalty shoot-out)	Kane
(Russia) 2018	Quarter-final	Sweden	2–0	Maguire, Alli
(Russia) 2018	Semi-final	Croatia	1–2 (a.e.t.)	Trippier
(Russia) 2018	Match for third place	Belgium	0–2	—
(Qatar) 2022	Group B	Iran	6–2	Bellingham, Saka (2), Sterling, Rashford, Grealish
(Qatar) 2022	Group B	United States	0–0	—
(Qatar) 2022	Group B	Wales	3–0	Rashford (2), Foden
(Qatar) 2022	Round of 16	Senegal	3–0	Henderson, Kane, Saka
(Qatar) 2022	Quarter-final	France	1–2	Kane
(Canada) (Mexico) (United States) 2026	Group L	Croatia	4–2	Kane (2), Bellingham, Rashford
(Canada) (Mexico) (United States) 2026	Group L	Ghana	0–0	—
(Canada) (Mexico) (United States) 2026	Group L	Panama	2–0	Bellingham, Kane
(Canada) (Mexico) (United States) 2026	Round of 32	DR Congo	2–1	Kane (2)
(Canada) (Mexico) (United States) 2026	Round of 16	Mexico	3–2	Bellingham (2), Kane
(Canada) (Mexico) (United States) 2026	Quarter-final	Norway	2–1 (a.e.t.)	Bellingham (2)
(Canada) (Mexico) (United States) 2026	Semi-final	Argentina	1–2	Gordon
(Canada) (Mexico) (United States) 2026	Match for third place	France	6–4	Rice, Konsa, Saka (3), Bellingham

=== By opponent ===
Opponent	Played	Won	Drawn	Lost	GF	GA	GD
Argentina	6	3	1	2	9	7	+2
Germany	5	1	2	2	8	10	−2
France	4	3	0	1	12	7	+5
Belgium	4	1	1	2	5	7	−2
Brazil	4	0	1	3	2	6	−4
Sweden	3	1	2	0	5	3	+2
Portugal	3	1	1	1	2	2	0
United States	3	0	2	1	1	2	−1
Uruguay	3	0	1	2	3	6	−3
Panama	2	2	0	0	8	1	+7
Paraguay	2	2	0	0	4	0	+4
Mexico	2	2	0	0	5	2	+3
Tunisia	2	2	0	0	4	1	+3
Czechoslovakia	2	2	0	0	3	0	+3
Colombia	2	1	1	0	3	1	+2
Croatia	2	1	0	1	5	4	+1
Romania	2	1	0	1	2	2	0
Soviet Union	2	0	1	1	2	3	−1
Spain	2	0	1	1	0	1	−1
Italy	2	0	0	2	2	4	−2
Iran	1	1	0	0	6	2	+4
Poland	1	1	0	0	3	0	+3
Denmark	1	1	0	0	3	0	+3
Wales	1	1	0	0	3	0	+3
Senegal	1	1	0	0	3	0	+3
Chile	1	1	0	0	2	0	+2
Switzerland	1	1	0	0	2	0	+2
Trinidad and Tobago	1	1	0	0	2	0	+2
Cameroon	1	1	0	0	3	2	+1
DR Congo	1	1	0	0	2	1	+1
Norway	1	1	0	0	2	1	+1
Kuwait	1	1	0	0	1	0	+1
Egypt	1	1	0	0	1	0	+1
Ecuador	1	1	0	0	1	0	+1
Slovenia	1	1	0	0	1	0	+1
Austria	1	0	1	0	2	2	0
Republic of Ireland	1	0	1	0	1	1	0
Bulgaria	1	0	1	0	0	0	0
Morocco	1	0	1	0	0	0	0
Netherlands	1	0	1	0	0	0	0
Nigeria	1	0	1	0	0	0	0
Algeria	1	0	1	0	0	0	0
Costa Rica	1	0	1	0	0	0	0
Ghana	1	0	1	0	0	0	0
Hungary	1	0	0	1	1	2	−1

Last update: 18 July 2026

== Player records ==
=== Most appearances ===
Rank	Player	Matches	World Cups
1	Jordan Pickford	19	2018, 2022 and 2026
2	Harry Kane	18	2018, 2022 and 2026
3	Marcus Rashford	17	2018, 2022 and 2026
3	Peter Shilton	17	1982, 1986 and 1990
3	John Stones	17	2018, 2022 and 2026
6	Terry Butcher	14	1982, 1986 and 1990
6	Bobby Charlton	14	1962, 1966 and 1970
6	Ashley Cole	14	2002, 2006 and 2010
6	Bobby Moore	14	1962, 1966 and 1970
10	David Beckham	13	1998, 2002 and 2006
10	Jude Bellingham	13	2022 and 2026

=== Top goalscorers ===
Rank	Player	Goals	World Cups
1	Harry Kane	14	2018 (6), 2022 (2) and 2026 (6)
2	Gary Lineker	10	1986 (6) and 1990 (4)
3	Jude Bellingham	8	2022 (1) and 2026 (7)
4	Bukayo Saka	6	2022 (3) and 2026 (3)
5	Geoff Hurst	5	1966 (4) and 1970 (1)
6	Bobby Charlton	4	1962 (1) and 1966 (3)
6	Michael Owen	4	1998 (2) and 2002 (2)
6	Marcus Rashford	4	2022 (3) and 2026 (1)
9	Nat Lofthouse	3	1954
9	Roger Hunt	3	1966
9	David Platt	3	1990
9	David Beckham	3	1998, 2002 and 2006
9	Steven Gerrard	3	2006 (2) and 2010 (1)

=== List of England goals by tournament ===
World Cup	Goalscorer(s)
1950	Wilf Mannion, Stan Mortensen
1954	Nat Lofthouse (3), Ivor Broadis (2), Tom Finney, Jimmy Mullen, Dennis Wilshaw
1958	Derek Kevan (2), Tom Finney, Johnny Haynes
1962	Ron Flowers (2), Bobby Charlton, Jimmy Greaves, Gerry Hitchens
1966	Geoff Hurst (4), Bobby Charlton (3), Roger Hunt (3), Martin Peters
1970	Allan Clarke, Geoff Hurst, Alan Mullery, Martin Peters
1982	Trevor Francis (2), Bryan Robson (2), Paul Mariner, own goal
1986	Gary Lineker (6), Peter Beardsley
1990	Gary Lineker (4), David Platt (3), Mark Wright
1998	Michael Owen (2), Alan Shearer (2), Darren Anderton, David Beckham, Paul Scholes
2002	Michael Owen (2), David Beckham, Sol Campbell, Rio Ferdinand, Emile Heskey
2006	Steven Gerrard (2), David Beckham, Joe Cole, Peter Crouch, own goal
2010	Jermain Defoe, Steven Gerrard, Matthew Upson
2014	Wayne Rooney, Daniel Sturridge
2018	Harry Kane (6), John Stones (2), Dele Alli, Jesse Lingard, Harry Maguire, Kieran Trippier
2022	Marcus Rashford (3), Bukayo Saka (3), Harry Kane (2), Jude Bellingham, Phil Foden, Jack Grealish, Jordan Henderson, Raheem Sterling
2026	Jude Bellingham (7), Harry Kane (6), Bukayo Saka (3), Marcus Rashford, Anthony Gordon, Declan Rice, Ezri Konsa

=== Foreign-based England players at World Cups ===
Historically, very few English World Cup squad members were playing for a club in a foreign league at the time of their selection to the national squad.

Year	Number (Country)	Players (Apps)
1950–1958	0	
1962	1 (Italy)	Gerry Hitchens (2)
1966–1970	0	
1982	1 (West Germany)	Tony Woodcock (2)
1986	2 (Italy)	Mark Hateley (3), Ray Wilkins (2)
1990	5 (4 Scotland, 1 France)	Terry Butcher (5), Trevor Steven (3), Gary Stevens (2), Chris Woods (0), Chris Waddle (7)
1998	0	
2002	1 (Germany)	Owen Hargreaves (2)
2006	2 (1 Spain, 1 Germany)	David Beckham (5), Owen Hargreaves (4)
2010	0	
2014	1 (Scotland)	Fraser Forster (0)
2018	0	
2022	1 (Germany)	Jude Bellingham (5)
2026	5 (2 Germany, 2 Spain, 1 Saudi Arabia)	Jude Bellingham (8), Harry Kane (7), Jarell Quansah (3), Marcus Rashford (6), Ivan Toney (2)

== Team awards and records ==
Team awards

- World Champions: 1966
- Third Place: 2026
- FIFA Fair Play Trophy: 1990, 1998 (shared), 2022

Individual awards

- Golden Ball 1966: Bobby Charlton
- Golden Boot 1986: Gary Lineker
- Golden Boot 2018: Harry Kane
- Bronze Boot 1966: Geoff Hurst
- Bronze Boot 2026: Jude Bellingham
- Best Young Player Award 1998: Michael Owen

Individual records

- First hat-trick in a final: Geoff Hurst (1966 v West Germany)
- Oldest captain: Peter Shilton (age 40 years and 292 days, 1990 v Italy)
- Most clean sheets: Peter Shilton (10, 1982–1990) (shared with Fabien Barthez)

== Refereeing ==
Three FIFA World Cup finals were officiated by English referees, more than by any other football association. The first Englishman to officiate a decisive match, George Reader, is also the oldest World Cup referee to date, as he was 53 years and 236 days old in the 1950 decisive match between Uruguay and Brazil. The actual final referees are William Ling (1954), Jack Taylor (1974) and Howard Webb (2010).

Arthur Ellis, who was a linesman for the 1950 decisive match, is part of an elite group of referees who have been called up for three consecutive World Cups (1950, 1954 and 1958).

== See also ==
- England at the UEFA European Championship
- List of England national football team World Cup and European Championship squads
- England at the FIFA Women's World Cup
