= One Night in Turin =

2010 film

- Theatrical release poster
- Directed by: James Erskine
- Screenplay by: James Erskine
- Story by: Pete Davies
- Based on: All Played Out by Pete Davies
- Produced by: James Erskine; Victoria Gregory; Alex Holmes
- Starring: Bobby Robson; Paul Gascoigne; Colin Moynihan; Douglas Hurd; Margaret Thatcher; Graham Kelly
- Narrated by: Gary Oldman
- Cinematography: Lol Crawley
- Edited by: Robin Peters
- Music by: Stuart Hancock
- Production company: New Black Films
- Distributed by: Kaleidoscope
- Release date: 19 May 2010 (United Kingdom)
- Running time: 97 minutes
- Country: United Kingdom
- Language: English
- Budget: £100,000

One Night in Turin is a 2010 British documentary film directed by James Erskine, and written by Pete Davies and Erskine. The documentary is about the England football team during 1990 FIFA World Cup and left the nation undone by West Germany on penalties in the semi-final. It looks at the social and political context of the event as well as how it changed people's perception of football and the England team.

== Background ==
Adapted from Pete Davies' 1990 eye-witness account All Played Out, a memoir of the England football team's World Cup adventure at the 1990 World Cup. The film weaves together the strands of a narrative which has a distinctive arc.

The film only uses archive footage – there are no modern contextual interviews, all the footage is from the time. The match action is intercut with reconstructed, modern-day footage.

== Synopsis ==
The film revisits the iconic footballing footage: Paul Gascoigne's tears, Gary Lineker's goals, David Platt's volley against Belgium, Lineker mouthing to the touchline after Gascoigne's yellow card against West Germany, Bobby Robson's rueful smile and consoling Gascoigne with the words, "You've got your life ahead of you. This is your first." As well as English football hooligans, Prime Minister Margaret Thatcher backing a proposal to stop England going to Italy, Tory Sports minister Colin Moynihan encouraging the Italian police to be extremely firm with England's supporters, the tabloid press hounding of Sir Bobby and Chris Waddle's calamitous penalty shoot-out kick. It weaves rare, unseen footage with a Gary Oldman-voiced narrative and a soundtrack with early nineties music.

Setting the World Cup in a wider socio-political context, Erskine examines how close hooliganism came to wrecking the competition and how quickly sports minister Colin Moynihan condoned the Italian authorities' heavy-handed tactics. But the emphasis is most firmly on Robson's battles with the media and the emergence of Paul Gascoigne as the tournament's superstar. It climaxes with the night at the Stadio delle Alpi in Turin when they lost the semi-final to West Germany on penalties. The film ends abruptly but over the credits there is England's highlights since then.

It is subtitled: The Inside Story of a World Cup that Changed Our Footballing Nation Forever. Erskine sticks closely to Davies' book meaning he never strays far from the narrative of Davies' book.

== Appearances ==
- Bobby Robson, England football manager
- Paul Gascoigne
- Colin Moynihan MP, Minister for Sport
- Douglas Hurd MP, Home Secretary
- Margaret Thatcher, Prime Minister
- Graham Kelly, The Football Association Chief Executive
- Jack Charlton, Republic of Ireland football manager
- Glenn Roeder

== Music ==
One Night in Turin official film score album is by British composer Stuart Hancock and was released a digital EP by MovieScore Media on 1 June 2010. The film's soundtrack used popular music of the time from The Stone Roses, Happy Mondays, New Order and The Charlatans.

One Night in Turin

Film score by Stuart Hancock
- Released: 1 June 2010
- Genre: Classical
- Length: 19:26
- Language: Italian

Stuart Hancock chronology
Bodyguard: A New Beginning (Original Motion Picture Soundtrack) (2009)	One Night in Turin (2010)	Hawk (Original Motion Picture Soundtrack) (2011)

One Night in Turin (Original Motion Picture Score) is the film score of British documentary film One Night in Turin, written and directed by James Erskine, and based on Pete Davies' book All Played Out. The album is the third soundtrack/film score by British composer Stuart Hancock.

Darren Rea of Review Graveyard said of the score, "It's short, it's sweet, but not a second of this EP is wasted. This is wall to wall, grade A quality material. Listen out for Stuart Hancock in the future - this is a name you'll hopefully be hearing a lot of."

All music is composed by Stuart Hancock and The Bratislava Symphony Orchestra.

No.	Title	Music	Length
1.	"Nessun Dorma (From Turandot)"	Stuart Hancock, Sean Ruane	2:38
2.	"Planet Football"	Hancock	0:45
3.	"Trusted Lieutenants"	Hancock	0:46
4.	"The Minister for Sport"	Hancock	1:05
5.	"England vs. West Germany" (Part 1)	Hancock	3:49
6.	"England vs. West Germany" (Part 2)	Hancock	2:59
7.	"England vs. West Germany" (Part 3: Incorporating Nessun Dorma)	Hancock, Ruane	7:24
Total length:			19:26

== Reception ==
The Times described it as "A wonderful reminiscence of a life-changing time." David Parkinson of Radio Times said, "...the movie relives the events with suitable enthusiasm and nostalgia." David Jenkins of Time Out thought "It's a familiar tale, but only the hardest of hearts would dismiss its storytelling gusto and clever use of archive footage." Richard Firth of This Is Local London rated it 4/5 and said, "One Night in Turin does justice to all the emotion entwined around it [the 1990 World Cup]. It brings to mind all the thoughts and feelings you had at the time and it reveals some things you may never have spotted..." Warren Howard of Belfast Telegraph thought "One Night in Turin manages to be an effective historical document as well as an engaging retelling of England's dramatic progress towards an unforgettable semi-final with West Germany during the 1990 World Cup in Italy. Yet it's still the iconic footballing footage that really hits home..." Nicholas Barber of The Independent on Sunday called it "Timely".

Tom Dawson of Total Film thought "Erskine's One Night In Turin argues that the endeavours of Bobby Robson's players eased the memories of Heysel and Hillsborough, leading to a rebirth of the national game..." Richard Luck of Film4.com said, "More compelling still is Erskine's insistence that, as disappointing as defeat might have been, the way England played throughout Italia 90 went a long way towards soothing the nightmares of Heysel, Bradford and Hillsborough. It's a well-constructed argument that points up the insignificance of victory and defeat in the greater scheme of things." He added: "One night in Turin might have restored national pride but it pointed towards the selfishness that has since ruined the beautiful game."

Kevin Pocock of Den of Geek rated the film 2/5 and described is as "a well-constructed, finely narrated, re-stitching of that titular night in Turin, intriguing for those who didn't witness the events when they happened, and equally so for those who haven't mulled it to death since." Ronald Short of College Movie Review scored the film a D− and said, "For an indie film, it's decent. I'm sure the soccer fans will love it, but as for the rest of us? It's nothing really worth watching."

Mark Douglas of The Journal described it as "It is an unashamedly enjoyable hour and a half." He added: "Perhaps the film might have been beefed up by a few talking heads slots, which would have given the main protagonists an opportunity to expand on their roles in this particular passion play." Edward Porter of The Sunday Times said, "Like many an England performance, it's the work of a team making the best of limited resources. Not only are there no interviews, but the footage of the game — and of all the other matches covered in the build-up — is patchy." Peter Martin of Twitch Film thought "Much time and care was spent on the recreations, but they have an odd flavor, with the majority of them consisting of unnecessary inserts that stick out from the archival material like a series of sore thumbs." He added: "Gary Oldman, who narrates, speaks in flat, even tones... It's a refreshing, realistic approach, but it's undermined by the recreations. I wonder if all that time and effort wouldn't have been better served by integrating modern-day interviews providing historical perspective, such as the interview with author Pete Davies that's included as one of the extras."

David Edwards of the Mirror.co.uk said, "One Night In Turin... provides an entertaining look at how manager Bobby Robson became a national hero and Gazza's tears made him a celebrity. Crucially, though, it fails to tell us anything we didn't already know." Anthony Quinn of The Independent said thought "The director James Erskine catches something of the mood ("Nessun Dorma" is in there too), but offers nothing in the way of perspective or second thoughts." Philip French of The Observer said, "The film is strictly for nostalgists and students of visual and verbal clichés." Phil of De Semlyen of Empire rated the film 2/5 and called it "Nostalgic viewing for fans that offers up too little by way of fresh insights."

Peter Bradshaw of The Guardian said, "As it is, One Night in Turin looks a bit like a DVD given away with a Sunday newspaper – but watchable, nevertheless." Wendy Idle of The Times said, "All documentaries tend to nudge reality towards a slightly heightened sense of drama but this is like taking a shameless dive in the penalty area: a little undignified."

== See also ==
- England–Germany football rivalry
- List of association football films
- List of sports films
