= 2002 FIFA World Cup qualification – UEFA Group 9 =

The 2002 FIFA World Cup qualification UEFA Group 9 was a UEFA qualifying group for the 2002 FIFA World Cup. The group comprised Albania, England, Finland, Germany and Greece.

The group was won by England, who qualified for the 2002 FIFA World Cup. The runners-up, Germany — who would later reach the final of the tournament proper — entered the UEFA Qualification Playoffs.

England started the qualification process badly, a home defeat to Germany and an away draw with Finland (soon after a poor team performance at the 2000 European Championships) saw the resignation of their manager Kevin Keegan, and the appointment of Sven-Göran Eriksson – the first non-Englishman to be given the job – in his place. With the new manager, they picked themselves up and won five in a row, while the Germans themselves unexpectedly faltered: also drawing with Finland away from home, they also lost their home match with England by a resounding 5–1. Finland, in fact, might have been in with a chance of qualification themselves, but they lost a match to the unfancied Greece, whom England had to play in their final match, while Finland played Germany at the same time, with England and Germany guaranteed the top two places and separated only by goal difference. Greece unexpectedly took the lead twice at Old Trafford, but England captain David Beckham scored an injury-time free kick to level the game. Germany could only manage a 0–0 draw against Finland, meaning England topped the group on goal difference.

== Standings ==
Pos	Team	Pld	W	D	L	GF	GA	GD	Pts	Qualification	England national football team	Germany national football team	Finland national football team	Greece national football team	Albania national football team
1	England	8	5	2	1	16	6	+10	17	Qualification to 2002 FIFA World Cup	—	0–1	2–1	2–2	2–0
2	Germany	8	5	2	1	14	10	+4	17	Advance to UEFA play-offs	1–5	—	0–0	2–0	2–1
3	Finland	8	3	3	2	12	7	+5	12		0–0	2–2	—	5–1	2–1
4	Greece	8	2	1	5	7	17	−10	7		0–2	2–4	1–0	—	1–0
5	Albania	8	1	0	7	5	14	−9	3		1–3	0–2	0–2	2–0	—

== Matches ==
2 September 2000
15:00

Finland	2–1	Albania
Litmanen 45'; Riihilahti 68'	Report	Murati 64'

Finnair Stadium, Helsinki
Attendance: 10,770
Referee: Rene Temmink (Netherlands)
2 September 2000
19:00

Germany	2–0	Greece
Deisler 17'; Scholl 75'	Report

Volksparkstadion, Hamburg
Attendance: 48,500
Referee: Antonio Lopez Nieto (Spain)

7 October 2000
15:00

England	0–1	Germany
	Report	Hamann 14'

Wembley Stadium, London
Attendance: 76,377
Referee: Stefano Braschi (Italy)
7 October 2000
20:15

Greece	1–0	Finland
Liberopoulos 59'	Report

Olympic Stadium, Athens
Attendance: 15,000
Referee: Pierluigi Collina (Italy)

11 October 2000
19:00

Albania	2–0	Greece
Bushi 48'; Fakaj 90'	Report

Qemal Stafa Stadium, Tirana
Attendance: 10,200
Referee: Rune Pedersen (Norway)
11 October 2000
19:00

Finland	0–0	England
	Report

Olympiastadion, Helsinki
Attendance: 36,210
Referee: Alain Sars (France)

24 March 2001
15:00

England	2–1	Finland
Owen 44'; Beckham 50'	Report	Riihilahti 26'

Anfield, Liverpool
Attendance: 44,262
Referee: Valentin Ivanov (Russia)
24 March 2001
20:00

Germany	2–1	Albania
Deisler 49'; Klose 87'	Report	Kola 65'

BayArena, Leverkusen
Attendance: 22,500
Referee: Graziano Cesari (Italy)

28 March 2001
20:30

Albania	1–3	England
Rraklli 90+2'	Report	Owen 74'; Scholes 85'; Andy Cole 90+6'

Qemal Stafa Stadium, Tirana
Attendance: 18,000
Referee: Alain Hamer (Luxembourg)
28 March 2001
21:30

Greece	2–4	Germany
Charisteas 20'; Georgiadis 43'	Report	Rehmer 6'; Ballack 25' (pen.); Klose 82'; Bode 90'

Olympic Stadium, Athens
Attendance: 32,173
Referee: Vitor Melo Pereira (Portugal)

2 June 2001
20:00

Finland	2–2	Germany
Forssell 28', 43'	Report	Ballack 69' (pen.); Jancker 73'

Olympiastadion, Helsinki
Attendance: 35,744
Referee: Dick Jol (Netherlands)
2 June 2001
21:00

Greece	1–0	Albania
Machlas 70'	Report

Theodoros Vardinogiannis Stadium, Heraklion
Attendance: 5,500
Referee: Nikolai Levnikov (Russia)

6 June 2001
19:30

Albania	0–2	Germany
	Report	Rehmer 27'; Ballack 68'

Qemal Stafa, Tirana
Attendance: 12,800
Referee: Gilles Veissiere (France)
6 June 2001
21:45

Greece	0–2	England
	Report	Scholes 63'; Beckham 87'

Olympic Stadium, Athens
Attendance: 29,300
Referee: Rune Pedersen (Norway)

1 September 2001
19:00

Albania	0–2	Finland
	Report	Tainio 55'; Kuqi 90+3'

Qemal Stafa, Tirana
Attendance: 6,400
Referee: Erol Ersoy (Turkey)
1 September 2001
19:30

Germany	1–5	England
Jancker 6'	Report	Owen 12', 48', 65'; Gerrard 45+3'; Heskey 73'

Olympiastadion, Munich
Attendance: 63,000
Referee: Pierluigi Collina (Italy)

5 September 2001
19:00

Finland	5–1	Greece
Forssell 14', 45'; Riihilahti 21'; Kolkka 38'; Litmanen 53'	Report	Karagounis 30'

Olympiastadion, Helsinki
Attendance: 27,216
Referee: Paul Allaerts (Belgium)
5 September 2001
20:00

England	2–0	Albania
Owen 43'; Fowler 88'	Report

St. James' Park, Newcastle
Attendance: 51,046
Referee: Juan Fernández Marín (Spain)

6 October 2001
15:00

England	2–2	Greece
Sheringham 68'; Beckham 90+3'	Report	Charisteas 36'; Nikolaidis 69'

Old Trafford, Manchester
Attendance: 66,000
Referee: Dick Jol (Netherlands)
6 October 2001
16:00

Germany	0–0	Finland
	Report

Arena AufSchalke, Gelsenkirchen
Attendance: 52,000
Referee: Anders Frisk (Sweden)

== Goalscorers ==
There were 54 goals scored in 20 matches, for an average of 2.7 goals per match.

6 goals

- (England) Michael Owen

4 goals

- (Finland) Mikael Forssell

3 goals

- (England) David Beckham
- (Finland) Aki Riihilahti
- (Germany) Michael Ballack

2 goals

- (England) Paul Scholes
- (Finland) Jari Litmanen
- (Germany) Sebastian Deisler
- (Germany) Carsten Jancker
- (Germany) Miroslav Klose
- (Germany) Marko Rehmer
- (Greece) Angelos Charisteas

1 goal

- (Albania) Alban Bushi
- (Albania) Ervin Fakaj
- (Albania) Bledar Kola
- (Albania) Edvin Murati
- (Albania) Altin Rraklli
- (England) Andy Cole
- (England) Robbie Fowler
- (England) Steven Gerrard
- (England) Emile Heskey
- (England) Teddy Sheringham
- (Finland) Joonas Kolkka
- (Finland) Shefki Kuqi
- (Finland) Teemu Tainio
- (Germany) Marco Bode
- (Germany) Dietmar Hamann
- (Germany) Mehmet Scholl
- (Greece) Georgios Georgiadis
- (Greece) Georgios Karagounis
- (Greece) Nikos Liberopoulos
- (Greece) Nikos Machlas
- (Greece) Themistoklis Nikolaidis
