= James Erskine (filmmaker) =

British screenwriter, film director and producer

- Born: Stockport, England
- Occupation: Film director
- Website: www.newblackfilms.com

James Erskine is a British screenwriter, film director and producer. The Human Face (2001), which he co-directed, was nominated for the Outstanding Non-Fiction Special (Informational) Emmy Award in 2002.

== Filmography ==
Short film

Year	Title	Director	Producer
2001	The Invitation	Yes	No
2005	Closing the Deal	Yes	Yes

Feature film

Year	Title	Director	Writer	Producer	Notes
2004	EMR	Yes	Yes	Yes	Co-directed with Danny McCullough
2014	Shooting for Socrates	Yes	Yes	Yes	
2015	The White Room	Yes	Yes	Yes	
2027	Ignition	Yes	Yes	Yes	

Documentary film

Year	Title	Director	Writer	Producer	Ref.
2009	Vanishing of the Bees	No	Yes	Executive	
2010	One Night in Turin	Yes	Yes	Yes	
2011	From the Ashes	Yes	Yes	Yes	
2013	Battle of the Sexes	Yes	No	Yes	
2014	Pantani: The Accidental Death of a Cyclist	Yes	Yes	Yes	
2017	Sachin: A Billion Dreams	Yes	Yes	Yes	
2018	The Ice King	Yes	Yes	Yes	
2019	Billie	Yes	Yes	Yes	
2020	The End of the Storm	Yes	Yes	No	
2023	Copa 71	Yes	Yes	No	
2024	The Flight of Bryan	Yes	Yes	Yes	

Documentary series

Year	Title	Director	Producer	Ref.
2001	The Human Face	Yes	Yes	
2016	Le Mans: Racing is Everything	Yes	Yes	

== Awards ==
- 2002: The Human Face was nominated for the Outstanding Non-Fiction Special (Informational) Emmy Award
