= 2000 England v Germany football match =

Coordinates: 51°33′21.6″N 0°16′46.2″W

2002 FIFA World Cup qualification
- Wembley Stadium, venue of match
- Event: 2002 FIFA World Cup qualification – UEFA Group 9
England	Germany
(England)	(Germany)
0	1
- Date: 7 October 2000
- Venue: Wembley Stadium, London
- Referee: Stefano Braschi (Italy)
- Attendance: 76,377
- Weather: Light rain 11 °C (52 °F)

On 7 October 2000, England met Germany during the qualifying stages of the 2002 World Cup. It was the final match to be played at the original Wembley Stadium. Germany won the game 1–0, with the goal scored by Dietmar Hamann. England manager Kevin Keegan resigned from his position after this game. The return fixture in Munich, Germany, resulted in a 5–1 victory to England with Swedish Sven-Göran Eriksson as new England manager.

== Background ==
England had faced Germany earlier the same year at the UEFA Euro 2000, a match that England won 1-0.

The demolition of original Wembley Stadium had already been announced days before. Prior to the game, England's team selection was leaked to the media, leading to criticism from Keegan.

== Match ==
=== Team selection ===
Both England and Germany fielded 4–4–2 formations. England centre-back Gareth Southgate was unusually played in a defensive midfield position ahead of Paul Ince and Dennis Wise.

=== Summary ===
The only goal of the game was scored by Dietmar Hamann after fourteen minutes. It came from a free kick awarded for a foul on Michael Ballack by Paul Scholes 30 yards from goal. German goalkeeper Oliver Kahn saved shots from Andy Cole and England captain Tony Adams in the first half and a David Beckham free kick in the second. England's David Seaman, who some had blamed for the first goal, saved a shot by Mehmet Scholl on 52 minutes.

=== Details ===
7 October 2000
15:00 BST

England	0–1	Germany
	Report	Hamann 14'

Wembley Stadium, London
Attendance: 76,377
Referee: Stefano Braschi (Italy)

England	Germany

GK	1	David Seaman (Arsenal)
CB	5	Tony Adams (c) (Arsenal)
CB	4	Gareth Southgate (Aston Villa)
CB	6	Martin Keown (Arsenal)
RWB	2	Gary Neville (Manchester United)		(substituted off) 45'
LWB	3	Graeme Le Saux (Chelsea)		(substituted off) 77'
CM	7	David Beckham (Manchester United)		(substituted off) 82'
CM	8	Paul Scholes (Manchester United)
CM	11	Nick Barmby (Liverpool)
CF	9	Andy Cole (Manchester United)	(yellow card) 24'
CF	10	Michael Owen (Liverpool)
Substitutes:
GK	13	Nigel Martyn (Leeds United)
DF	12	Kieron Dyer (Newcastle United)		(substituted on) 77'
MF	14	Ray Parlour (Arsenal)		(substituted on) 82'
MF	15	Gareth Barry (Aston Villa)		(substituted on) 45'
MF	17	Dennis Wise (Chelsea)
FW	16	Emile Heskey (Liverpool)
FW	18	Kevin Phillips (Sunderland)
Manager:
Kevin Keegan

GK	1	Oliver Kahn (Bayern Munich)
CB	2	Marko Rehmer (Hertha BSC)
CB	3	Thomas Linke (Bayern Munich)
CB	5	Jens Nowotny (Bayer Leverkusen)	(yellow card) 82'
RM	8	Sebastian Deisler (Hertha BSC)
CM	4	Carsten Ramelow (Bayer Leverkusen)
CM	10	Dietmar Hamann (Liverpool)
LM	11	Marco Bode (Werder Bremen)		(substituted off) 86'
AM	6	Michael Ballack (Bayer Leverkusen)	(yellow card) 52'
AM	7	Mehmet Scholl (Bayern Munich)
CF	9	Oliver Bierhoff (c) (Milan)
Substitutes:
GK	12	Jens Lehmann (Borussia Dortmund)
FW	13	Paulo Rink (Bayer Leverkusen)
MF	14	Stefan Beinlich (Hertha BSC)
MF	15	Dariusz Wosz (Hertha BSC)
MF	16	Frank Baumann (Werder Bremen)
DF	17	Christian Ziege (Liverpool)		(substituted on) 86'
FW	18	Oliver Neuville (Bayer Leverkusen)
Manager:
Rudi Völler

Assistant referees:
Gennaro Mazzei (Italy)
Sergio Zuccolini (Italy)
Fourth official:
Fiorenzo Treossi (Italy)

Match rules

- 90 minutes.
- Seven named substitutes.
- Maximum of three substitutions.

== Aftermath ==
Immediately after the game, Keegan resigned as manager of England. England under-21 coach Howard Wilkinson was appointed as caretaker manager by the Football Association. He was succeeded by Sven-Goran Eriksson, who led England to a 5–1 victory over Germany in the return fixture.

Dietmar Hamann's goal was the last to be scored at the stadium. Hamann later stated in an interview that he regretted the fact that Keegan had resigned after the game, as he had supported Hamburger SV during Keegan's time at the club.

In May 2005, a poll to name a footbridge at the new Wembley Stadium saw the name Dietmar Hamann Bridge receive the most nominations. It was instead given the name White Horse Bridge.

== See also ==
- England–Germany football rivalry
