= Pete Davies =

English author of history and sports

Pete Davies is an English author of history and sports.

== Career ==
External videos
- Booknotes interview with Davies on American Road, September 2, 2002, C-SPAN

He wrote American Road: The Story of an Epic Transcontinental Journey at the Dawn of the Motor Age about the 1919 Motor Transport Corps convoy, for which Davies visited sites along the Lincoln Highway. His newspaper clippings are part of the Dwight D. Eisenhower Presidential Library and Museum.

Davies' All Played Out, an eyewitness account of the England men's football team at the 1990 World Cup, was adapted into One Night in Turin, a documentary film, in 2010. The original book has been described as "the best football book ever written".

In 1994–95, Davies turned his attentions to women's football and spent the season with Doncaster Belles while writing I Lost my Heart to the Belles.

Davies settled in Huddersfield, West Yorkshire, where in 2010 he worked at the local Sainsbury's supermarket and had a season ticket for Huddersfield Town.

== Bibliography ==
=== Novels ===
- (1986) Last Election
- (1989) Dollarville
- (2017) Playlist

=== Non-fiction ===
- (1990) All Played Out
- (1992) Storm Country: A Journey to the Heart of America
- (1994) Twenty-Two Foreigners in Funny Shorts: The Intelligent Fan's Guide to Soccer and World Cup '94
- (1996) I Lost My Heart to The Belles
- (1998) This England
- (1998) Mad Dogs and English Women
- (1999) Catching Cold; published in the United States as The Devil's Flu: The World's Deadliest Influenza Epidemic and the Scientific Hunt for the Virus That Caused It
- (2000) Inside the Hurricane: Face to Face with Nature's Deadliest Storms
- (2001) The Devil's Music: Into the Eye of the Hurricane
- (2002) American Road

== Film adaptations ==
- 2010 One Night in Turin — directed by James Erskine
