= The Human Face =

BBC TV series

- Written by: John Cleese
- Directed by: James Erskine; David Stewart
- Starring: John Cleese; Elizabeth Hurley; David Attenborough; Candice Bergen; Pierce Brosnan; Mali Finn; Charles Fleming; William Goldman; Kevyn Major Howard; Michael Palin; Joan Rivers; Michael Rix
- Countries of origin: United Kingdom; United States
- Original language: English

Production
- Executive producers: Nancy Lavin; Michael Mosley; Nicholas Rossiter
- Producers: James Erskine; David Stewart; Sally George; Sharon Gillooly
- Running time: 50 minutes

Original release
- Network: BBC
- Release: 7 March – 25 March 2001

The Human Face is a 4-part BBC series that examines the science behind facial beauty, expression, and fame. Actor and comedian John Cleese investigated identity, perception, creativity and sexuality and their relation to the human face, combining art, technology and human interest stories. Paul Ekman served as scientific adviser.

== Plot ==
=== Part One: Face to Face ===
Original airdate: 7 March 2001

This episode looks at how the face communicates without speech, focusing on expressions, disguise and the mysterious art of face-reading.

=== Part Two: Here’s Looking at You! ===
Original airdate: 14 March 2001

This episode investigates family resemblances, facial recognition and the purpose of the face and its features, going back to five hundred million years ago. It also speculates about the multi-racial face of the future and showed surgeons in Kentucky preparing for the world's first facial transplant.

=== Part Three: Beauty ===
Original airdate: 21 March 2001

This episode studies whether human physical attractiveness is a matter of personal taste, looking at standards of beauty that are shared worldwide: a pretty face suggests fertility, while ugliness suggests poor health. Big eyes, smooth skin and symmetrical features are valued, and can lead to a better job, more money, and better sex.

=== Part Four: Fame ===
Original airdate: 25 March 2001

This episode looks at the ubiquity of famous faces on billboards, magazines, and movie screens, and the messages they carry about sex, politics, glamour and power. Considering Diana, Princess of Wales, Jackie Onassis, Marilyn Monroe, it tells the story of the face as icon, from Egyptian mummies to Hollywood stars.

== Cast ==
- John Cleese as himself (Host)
- Elizabeth Hurley as Various roles
- David Attenborough as himself
- Candice Bergen as herself
- Pierce Brosnan as himself
- Mali Finn as herself
- Charles Fleming as himself
- William Goldman as himself
- Kevyn Major Howard as himself
- Michael Palin as Applicant/peasant
- Dr. Vilayanur Ramachandran as himself
- Vail Reese as himself
- Joan Rivers as herself
- Michael Rix as himself
- Prunella Scales as Pet shop owner/wife
- Carrie Armel as herself
- David Matsumoto as himself
- Cynthia Breazeal as herself
- Dacher Keltner as himself
- Victoria Wright as herself
- John Gottman as himself
- Paul Ekman as himself
- Ronald Zuker as himself
- Paul Nassif as himself
- Lisa Fuerst as herself
- Mitchell Fuerst as himself
- Jim Cooke as himself
- Cindy Cooke as herself
- Tommy Cooke as himself
- Dr. Keith Kendrick as himself
- Tim Watts as himself
- David Rodriguez as himself
- Rosita Rodriguez as herself
- Jennifer Thompson as herself
- Mike Gauldin as himself
- Dr. Michelle de Haan as herself
- Sarah Doukas as herself
- Dr. Stephen Marquardt as himself
- Dr. David Buss as himself
- Zara Brocklesby as herself
- Dr. John Manning as himself
- Henry de Lotbiniere as himself
- Rick Edwards as himself
- Ryan Martin as himself
- Michael Ricks as himself
- Jeanne Magagna as herself
- Dr. Bruce Charlton as himself
- Roger Hargreaves as himself
- Krista Smith as herself
