= 2001 Germany v England football match =

2002 FIFA World Cup qualification
- Event: 2002 FIFA World Cup qualification – UEFA Group 9
Germany	England
(Germany)	(England)
1	5
- Date: 1 September 2001
- Venue: Olympic Stadium, Munich
- Referee: Pierluigi Collina (Italy)
- Attendance: 63,000
- Weather: Overcast; 14 °C (57 °F)

On 1 September 2001, Germany met England during the qualifying stages of the 2002 World Cup, at the Olympiastadion in Munich. England won the game 5–1, helped by a hat-trick from Michael Owen. This was also the last match Germany played at the Olympiastadion.

== Background ==
=== Previous meetings ===
The two sides had met on many occasions, including the 1966 World Cup final at Wembley Stadium, in which England had beaten West Germany 4–2 after extra time. Four years later, in the quarter-final of the 1970 World Cup in Mexico, England failed to hold on to a 2–0 lead, losing 3–2 after extra time. They had also met in a 0-0 draw at the second group stage of the 1982 World Cup. West Germany defeated England in the semi-final of the 1990 World Cup on penalties. In Euro 1996, Germany again defeated England in a semi-final on penalties.

England had beaten Germany in June 2000, during the Euro 2000 competition, with a 1–0 win at the Stade du Pays de Charleroi in Belgium. Alan Shearer had scored the winning goal in the twilight of his international career. Before that match, England had not beaten Germany/West Germany in competitive football since the 1966 World Cup final.

The previous meeting between the two teams had been in October 2000, in the final match at the old Wembley stadium; that match ended with a 1–0 victory for Germany, with a goal from Dietmar Hamann. England's manager Kevin Keegan resigned after that game.

=== Tournament status ===
The game was part of the qualifying tournament for the 2002 World Cup. Germany were the clear group leaders in the qualifying tournament before the game. With only the group winners advancing directly to the World Cup, the qualifying group table was:

Team	Pld	W	D	L	GF	GA	GD	Pts
Germany	6	5	1	0	13	5	+8	16
England	5	3	1	1	7	3	+4	10
Greece	6	2	0	4	4	10	−6	6
Finland	5	1	2	2	5	6	−1	5
Albania	6	1	0	5	5	10	−5	3

A German victory would have confirmed their qualification and seen England competing with Greece and Finland for a place in the play-offs. A draw would have resulted in Germany requiring just another draw from their final game, and England requiring two victories, a German loss, and an improvement in their goal difference. Germany had lost just one of their previous sixty qualification games, for the 1986 World Cup, and had been unbeaten at the Munich Olympic stadium since 1973. The German Football Association were so confident that Germany would finish at the top of the qualifying table that they had arranged friendlies on the dates of the play-offs.

England named four strikers in their squad, with Robbie Fowler and Andy Cole having started the recent friendly with the Netherlands. Sven-Göran Eriksson recalled the in-form Michael Owen and his strike partner Emile Heskey in an attacking line-up for the match in Munich.

== Match ==
=== First half ===
The match was an evening game, and began nervously, with both teams attempting to maintain possession. After just six minutes, Germany scored when Oliver Neuville headed down a lofted pass into England's penalty area, and Carsten Jancker tapped the ball past the England goalkeeper David Seaman.

The lead did not last long, and after Michael Owen was fouled outside the German penalty area in the 12th minute, England were given a free kick. England's captain David Beckham took the kick, which neither the attacking nor defending players managed to touch. Gary Neville headed the ball back into the penalty area, where Nick Barmby headed it down to Owen, who volleyed the ball past Oliver Kahn.

Both teams then had chances during the rest of the first half, notably Sebastian Deisler for Germany; Seaman and Kahn both made some good saves. Just before the half-time, England won another free kick on the edge of the German penalty area, which was again taken by Beckham. Although he failed to beat the German wall, he crossed the ball back into the penalty area. Rio Ferdinand headed it back to Steven Gerrard, who shot the ball into the bottom-left corner of the goal from 25 yards out, putting England 2–1 up.

=== Second half ===
Three minutes after the kick-off, a cross from Beckham found Emile Heskey, who headed the ball down to Owen, who was unmarked. Owen hit the ball into right-hand corner of the net. Kahn managed to get a hand to the ball, but was unable to stop England taking a 3–1 lead.

Although Germany were able to create further chances, it was England who struck again in the 66th minute. Gerrard's successful tackle gave him possession, and he played a through ball to Owen, who sprinted into the box and fired the ball over Kahn's head to give England a 4–1 lead. This made Owen the first England player since Geoff Hurst in the 1966 World Cup final to score a hat-trick against Germany or West Germany.

England began to defend their heavy lead. In the 74th minute, they extended it further following a counter-attack. Ferdinand won the ball in defence and gave it to Paul Scholes, who progressed up the pitch through a one-two passing move with Beckham. Scholes passed the ball to Heskey, who ran past Marko Rehmer and hit the ball low past Kahn to make it 5–1.

The final twenty minutes were quiet, with Germany beaten and England not needing to create any more chances. Some German fans left the game early in disgust, whilst the English fans celebrated their biggest victory since a 6–0 win over Luxembourg in 1999. It was England's biggest away win since 1993, when they had beaten San Marino 7–1. It was the first time that Germany had conceded five goals or more since West Germany's 6–3 defeat by France in 1958, and only the third time in their history that they had lost by four goals or more. Germany went on to lose 5–1 again, against Romania, in 2004.

=== Details ===
1 September 2001
19:30 CET

Germany	1–5	England
Jancker 6'	Report	Owen 12', 48', 66'; Gerrard 45+4'; Heskey 74'

Olympiastadion, Munich
Attendance: 63,000
Referee: Pierluigi Collina (Italy)

Germany	England

GK	1	Oliver Kahn (Bayern Munich) (c)
SW	5	Jens Nowotny (Bayer Leverkusen)
CB	2	Christian Wörns (Borussia Dortmund)		(substituted off) 46'
CB	4	Thomas Linke (Bayern Munich)
RWB	7	Marko Rehmer (Hertha Berlin)
LWB	6	Dietmar Hamann (Liverpool)	(yellow card) 79'
CM	10	Sebastian Deisler (Hertha Berlin)
CM	8	Michael Ballack (Bayer Leverkusen)		(substituted off) 65'
CM	3	Jörg Böhme (Schalke 04)
CF	9	Carsten Jancker (Bayern Munich)
CF	11	Oliver Neuville (Bayer Leverkusen)		(substituted off) 78'
Substitutes:
GK	12	Jens Lehmann (Borussia Dortmund)
FW	13	Oliver Bierhoff (AS Monaco)
FW	14	Gerald Asamoah (Schalke 04)		(substituted on) 46'
MF	15	Sebastian Kehl (SC Freiburg)		(substituted on) 78'
DF	16	Frank Baumann (Werder Bremen)
MF	17	Christian Ziege (Tottenham Hotspur)
FW	18	Miroslav Klose (Kaiserslautern)		(substituted on) 65'
Manager:
(Germany) Rudi Völler

GK	1	David Seaman (Arsenal)
RB	2	Gary Neville (Manchester United)
CB	5	Rio Ferdinand (Leeds United)
CB	6	Sol Campbell (Arsenal)
LB	3	Ashley Cole (Arsenal)
RM	7	David Beckham (Manchester United) (c)
CM	4	Steven Gerrard (Liverpool)		(substituted off) 78'
CM	8	Paul Scholes (Manchester United)		(substituted off) 83'
LM	11	Nick Barmby (Liverpool)		(substituted off) 64'
CF	10	Michael Owen (Liverpool)
CF	9	Emile Heskey (Liverpool)	(yellow card) 54'
Substitutes:
DF	12	Gareth Southgate (Middlesbrough)
GK	13	Nigel Martyn (Leeds United)
MF	14	Owen Hargreaves (Bayern Munich)		(substituted on) 78'
DF	15	Jamie Carragher (Liverpool)		(substituted on) 83'
MF	16	Steve McManaman (Real Madrid)		(substituted on) 64'
FW	17	Andy Cole (Manchester United)
FW	18	Robbie Fowler (Liverpool)
Manager:
(Sweden) Sven-Göran Eriksson

=== Statistics ===
	Germany	England
Goals scored	1	5
Total shots	14	10
Shots on target	3	6
Ball possession	61%	39%
Corner kicks	9	2
Fouls committed	19	16
Offsides	3	1
Yellow cards	1	1
Red cards	0	0

== Aftermath ==
The game provided a boost for the England squad's morale, and greatly increased the popularity of their manager, Sven-Göran Eriksson. It was a low point for the Germany national team, whose performances had been worsening since winning UEFA Euro 1996. It spawned two hit records: "England 5 – Germany 1" by the Business and "Sven Sven Sven" by Bell & Spurling. German manager Rudi Völler's father was reported to have suffered a heart attack watching the game.

England beat Albania 2–0 in their next match, four days later. This meant that England and Germany entered the final qualifying game with an equal number of points, though England now had a better goal difference. Neither team managed to win their final group game, with a last minute Beckham free kick earning England a 2–2 draw with Greece. This sent England directly through, whilst Germany went into the play-offs, in which they defeated Ukraine to qualify for the World Cup.

At the finals tournament in South Korea and Japan the following year, Germany finished as runners-up to Brazil after losing 2–0 in the final. German captain Oliver Kahn became the first goalkeeper to be awarded FIFA's Golden Ball, recognising the tournament's best player. England reached the quarter-finals, where they were also defeated by Brazil, losing 2–1.

== See also ==
- England–Germany football rivalry
- 1966 FIFA World Cup final
- 2000 England v Germany football match
- List of England national football team hat-tricks
- List of Germany national football team hat-tricks
