= England–Germany football rivalry =

National team association football rivalry

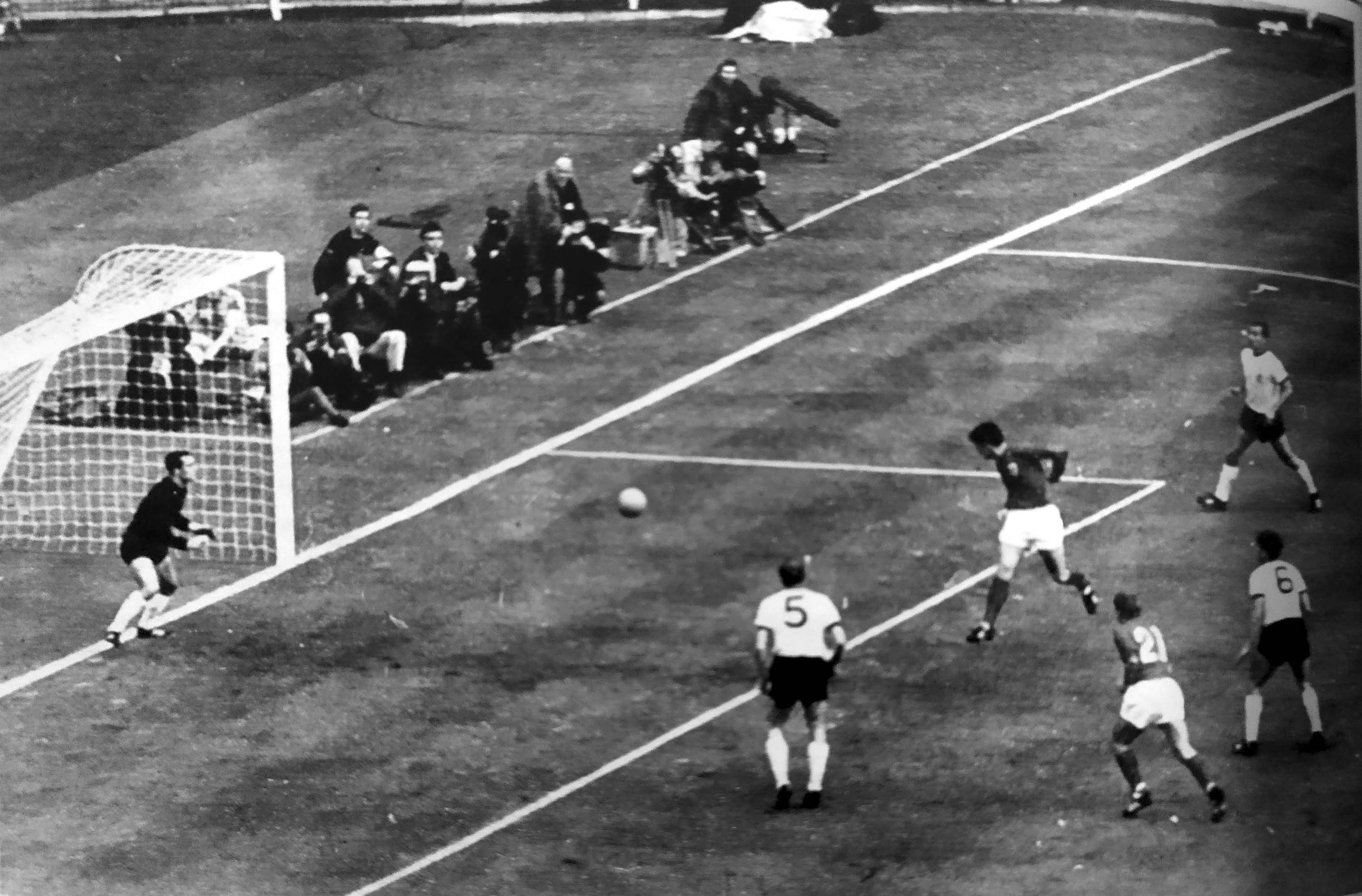
- Geoff Hurst scoring for England in the 1966 FIFA World Cup final which resulted in England winning the World Cup trophy
- Location: Europe (UEFA)
- Teams: England; Germany
- First meeting: 20 May 1930; Friendly; England 3–3 Germany
- Latest meeting: 26 September 2022; UEFA Nations League; England 3–3 Germany

Statistics
- Total meetings: 35
- Most wins: England (14)
- Largest victory: Germany 1–5 England (1 September 2001)
- Largest goal scoring: England 6–3 Germany (14 May 1938)

The English and German national football teams have played each other since the end of the 19th century; officially since 1930. The teams met for the first time in November 1899, when England beat Germany in four straight matches. Notable matches between England and Germany (or West Germany) include the 1966 FIFA World Cup final, the semi-finals of the 1990 FIFA World Cup and the UEFA Euro 1996, and the round of sixteen of the 2010 FIFA World Cup and UEFA Euro 2020. While the English public, football fans and in particular newspapers consider an England–Germany football rivalry to have developed, it is mostly an English phenomenon since most German fans consider the Netherlands or Italy to be their traditional footballing rivals.

In this article, references to the German football team include the former West Germany football team before German reunification.

== History ==
=== Early encounters ===
England and Germany have played 34 official matches against each other since 1930.

The Football Association (FA) instigated a four-game tour of Germany and Austria by a representative England team in November 1899. The England team played a representative German team in Berlin on 23 November 1899, with the German side losing 1–0. Two days later a slightly altered German side lost 10–2. The third and fourth matches were played in Prague and Karlsruhe against a combined Austrian and German side, and England won 6–0 and 7–0. Those games cannot be considered as "official" and are known as "proto-international matches" (Ur-Länderspiele) in Germany because they were organised by a regional federation from Berlin and the German Football Association (DFB) was not founded until 28 January 1900. On the other hand, the DFB considers four matches played between 1908 and 1913 against the England national amateur football team of the FA as official matches against England, while the FA does not.

The first ever full international between the two teams was a friendly match played on Saturday 10 May 1930, in Berlin. England were 1–0 and 2–1 up in the game, but after losing a player to injury went behind 3–2, before a late goal from David Jack brought the score to 3–3, which was how the game finished.

The next match between the two teams was played on 4 December 1935, at White Hart Lane in London, the first full international to take place between the teams in England and the first since the rise to power of Adolf Hitler and the Nazis in 1933. It was also the first match to stir up particular controversy, as The Observer newspaper reported protests by the British Trades Union Congress that the game could be used as a propaganda event by the Nazi regime. "No recent sporting event has been treated with such high seriousness in Germany as this match ... Between 7,500 and 8,000 Germans will travel via Dover, and special trains will bring them to London. A description broadcast throughout Germany ... Sir Walter Citrine, General Secretary of the TUC, in a further letter to Sir John Simon, the Home Secretary, said that 'such a large and carefully organised Nazi contingent coming to London might confirm the impression among people in this country that the event is being regarded as of some political importance by the visitors'."

Of the match itself, however, which England won 3–0, the same newspaper reported the following week that: "So chivalrous in heart and so fair in tackling were the English and German teams who played at Tottenham in mid-week that even the oldest of veterans failed to recall an international engagement played with such good manners by everybody."

The next game between the two teams, and the last to be played before the Second World War, was again in Germany, a friendly at the Olympic Stadium in Berlin on 14 May 1938, played in front of a crowd of 110,000 people. It was the last time England played against a unified German team until the 1990s. This was the most controversial of all the early encounters between the two teams, as before kick-off the English players were ordered by the Foreign Office to line up and perform a Nazi salute in respect to their hosts. How compliant the players were with this situation has been a matter of debate, with a feature in The Observer in 2001 speculating that they were "perhaps merely indifferent players (who had undoubtedly become more reluctant, to the point of mutiny, by the time the post-war memoirs were published)."

A BBC News Online report published in 2003 reported that the salute was calculated to show: "that Germany, which two months earlier had annexed Austria, was not a pariah state. The friendly game effectively helped clear the way for Chamberlain's "Peace for our time" deal with Hitler, which, in turn, led to Germany's invasion of Czechoslovakia." England won the match 6–3, but according to German writer Ulrich Linder, author of the book Strikers for Hitler: "To lose to England at the time was nothing unusual because basically everybody lost to [them] at the time. For Hitler, the propaganda effect of that game was more important than anything else."

The two countries did not meet again on a football pitch for sixteen years. Two German states had been founded in 1949, with the Germany national football team continuing its tradition, based in the Federal Republic of Germany (West Germany) from 1949 to 1990. The German Democratic Republic (East Germany) fielded a separate national football team; although the English did play some matches against them, the rivalry never developed the same edge or high-profile. A third German team, Saarland, also briefly existed between 1950 and 1956. However they never played a match against England.

In a friendly at Wembley Stadium on 1 December 1954, England won 3–1 against an under-strength West German side, who were at the time the champions of the world, having won the 1954 FIFA World Cup. England won further friendlies against West Germany in 1956 (3–1 at the Olympic Stadium in Berlin) and 1965 (1–0 in Nuremberg).

=== 1966–1969: 1966 FIFA World Cup ===
England and West Germany met at Wembley again on 23 February 1966, as part of their preparations for the 1966 FIFA World Cup, which was to be held in England. England again won 1–0, with a goal from Nobby Stiles, and the match also saw the first appearance for England of West Ham United striker Geoff Hurst.

Both countries had a successful World Cup in 1966, and met in the final played at Wembley on Saturday, 30 July 1966. This was and still is regarded by the teams as the most important match played between the two, and it was also the first time they had met in a competitive game, as opposed to the friendly matches they had played before. It was also a controversial game, which created the modern rivalry between the teams.

England led 2–1 until the very end of normal time, when a West German goal levelled the scores and took the match into extra time. In the first period of extra time, England striker Geoff Hurst had a shot on goal which bounced down from the crossbar and then out of the goal, before being cleared away by the West German defenders. The England players celebrated a goal, but the referee was unsure as to whether or not the ball had crossed the line when it hit the ground. After consulting with a linesman, Tofiq Bahramov, the referee awarded a goal to England. Bahramov, from the Soviet Union, became famous and celebrated in English popular culture as "the Russian linesman", although he was actually from Azerbaijan. When England played the Azerbaijan national team in a World Cup qualifier in October 2004—in a stadium named after Bahramov—many England fans travelling to the game asked to be shown the grave of the official, who had died in 1993, so that they could place flowers on it, and before the game a ceremony honouring him was attended by Hurst and other footballing celebrities.

West Germany, however, did not believe that the ball had crossed the line, with commentators such as Robert Becker of Kicker magazine accusing the linesman of bias because the West German team had eliminated the USSR in the semi-final. Modern studies using film analysis and computer simulation have suggested the ball never crossed the line – both Duncan Gillies of the Visual Information Processing Group at Imperial College London and Ian Reid and Andrew Zisserman of the Department of Engineering Science at University of Oxford agree that the ball would have needed to travel a further 2.5–6 cm to fully cross the line, and that therefore this was not a fair goal. In West Germany, it led to the creation of the expression "Wembley-Tor", or "Wembley-Goal", a phrase used to describe any goal scored in a similar fashion to Hurst's.

England, however, scored another controversial goal at the end of extra time, winning 4–2. This goal came after fans began to spill onto the field, thinking the game was over, which should have stopped play. The goal, a third for Hurst (making him the only man ever to score a hat-trick in a World Cup final until Kylian Mbappe in 2022), was described by BBC Television commentator Kenneth Wolstenholme in a now-famous piece of commentary, "They think it's all over... it is now!", referring to the English fans who had spilled onto the field. The expression has become a celebrated part of English popular culture, indelibly linked with the game in the minds of the English public.

The 1966 final's influence on the culture surrounding the England team would not end there, however. Despite playing on their home soil, England wore their away kit of red shirts, white shorts and red socks, and since then England fans have had a special affinity for their team's away kit, with retro 1966 shirts selling well in recent years.

The game is often held as having been the height of English sporting achievement, it has also created some favourable legacies; a common chant among England supporters at Germany games is "Two World Wars and One World Cup" to the tune of "Camptown Races".

Two years after the World Cup, on 1 June 1968, the two teams met again in another friendly match, this time in West Germany, in which the West Germans won their first victory over an English team, 38 years after they had first played. The scoreline was 1–0, Franz Beckenbauer scoring for West Germany, but as Hugh McIlvanney wrote in his match report for The Observer: "Comparing this miserable hour and a half (in which fouls far outnumbered examples of creative football) with the last great meeting between the countries is entirely fatuous. But that will not prevent the West Germans from doing it. Their celebrations will not be inhibited by the knowledge that today's losers were almost a reserve team, and even the agonies of boredom they shared with us will now seem worthwhile. They have beaten England, and that is enough."

=== 1970–89: 1970 FIFA World Cup ===
Far more noted and remembered, however, was the next competitive meeting between the two teams, in the quarter-finals of the 1970 FIFA World Cup in Mexico. England were 2–0 up, but Beckenbauer and Uwe Seeler equalised at 2–2 in the second half. In extra time, Geoff Hurst had a goal mysteriously ruled out and then Gerd Müller scored in extra time to win 3–2. England had been weakened by losing their goalkeeper Gordon Banks to illness, and also substituted Bobby Charlton, one of their leading players, while the Germans were in the midst of their comeback. As McIlvanney put it when reflecting on the loss five days later, "Sir Alf Ramsey's team are out because the best goalkeeper most people have ever seen turned sick, and one who is only slightly less gifted was overwhelmed by the suddenness of his promotion. In sport disaster often feeds upon itself but this was a sickeningly gluttonous example."

The result was psychologically damaging for English morale—as The Guardian newspaper described in a 2006 feature: "Four days later Harold Wilson blamed Labour's loss in the general election on the defeat. This marked the start of two decades of German footballing dominance and England's decline."

Two years later the teams met once more, in the quarter-finals of the European Championship, which were at the time held on a home-and-away basis. England lost 3–1 at Wembley on 29 April 1972 in the home leg, and on 13 May could only draw 0–0 in West Germany, being knocked out of the competition. Said The Observer in 2001: "England may have been robbed of the chance in Mexico ... but there were no shortage of excuses – the heat, the hostile crowd, the food which had felled Banks, the errors of Bonetti ... It was a conspiracy of fate more than a footballing defeat. In 1972, there were no excuses at all. West Germany did not just knock England out of the European Championships, they came to Wembley and comprehensively outclassed England." McIlvanney wrote in his match report for The Observer: "No Englishman can ever again warm himself with the old assumption that, on the football field if nowhere else, the Germans are an inferior race."

=== 1990–99: 1990 FIFA World Cup and UEFA Euro 1996 ===
There were several friendly games played in the 1970s and 1980s, with wins for both nations, but the next competitive match—a second round group game at the 1982 FIFA World Cup—ended in a disappointing 0–0 draw. England were later eliminated from that competition after drawing Spain 0-0, while Germany reached the final. However, when the teams next met competitively, at the 1990 FIFA World Cup, it was a rather more dramatic and eventful clash in the semi-finals, the first time England had reached that far in the competition since their win in 1966.

In summer 1990, the process of German reunification had advanced far, with the Deutsche Mark being introduced in the East two days before the semi-finals on 3 July. Unlike in previous decades, East German fans could openly support the German team of the DFB which by then had an 80+ year tradition.

The England team had started the event poorly and had not been expected to reach that stage of the competition, but in the game they could match the stronger German team, managed by Franz Beckenbauer. The Germans took the lead in the 59th minute when a free-kick from Andreas Brehme deflected off Paul Parker and over goalkeeper Peter Shilton. Gary Lineker equalised in the 80th minute, and then David Platt had a goal ruled out in extra time. The result was thus decided by a penalty shoot-out—the England team's first—which West Germany won 4–3 after misses from Stuart Pearce and Chris Waddle. England lost to host nation Italy in the match for third place, whilst West Germany defeated Argentina in the final.

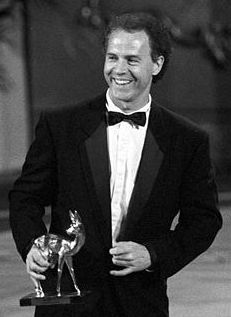
Manager Franz Beckenbauer led the German football team to victory against England in 1990.

The match stayed heavily in the English popular consciousness — not simply for the football and the dramatic manner of the defeat, but also for the reaction of star player Paul Gascoigne to receiving a yellow card. His second of the tournament, his realisation that this would see him suspended for the final should England make it prompted him to burst into tears on the pitch. Said The Observer in 2004, "There are half a dozen images that define this decade of change, which help to show why football widened its appeal. First, and most important, is the sight of Paul Gascoigne crying into his England shirt after being booked in the 1990 World Cup semi-final against West Germany. Unaggressive and emotional, a billboard image that helped to start an apparently unstoppable surge in popularity for the national team."

Despite this rehabilitation of the image of football aided by the English national team's success in the 1990 tournament, the narrow defeat by Germany helped to increase the antipathy felt towards the German team and the German nation in general. Mark Perryman wrote in 2006: "How could we expect to beat mighty (West) Germany, who had only narrowly lost the final four years previously? To my mind it is the fact that we so nearly did, then lost in the penalty shoot-out that explains the past 16 years of an increasingly bitter rivalry."

Germany was reunited in October 1990. For the DFB team, few things changed apart from players previously capped for East Germany becoming eligible for the united German team. This made little difference to the tone and emotion of the rivalry.

England's first match against the unified Germany since 1938 was a friendly in 1991 at Wembley, which the Germans won 1–0. Five years later, at the 1996 European Championships, England played a unified German team for the first time in a competitive fixture, when they met in the semi-finals. Like the 1966 World Cup, the tournament was being held in England, and the semi-final was played at Wembley Stadium. England's fans and team were confident, particularly after wins in the group stage over Scotland (2–0) and the Netherlands (4–1) and their first ever penalty shoot-out victory, over Spain, in the quarter-finals. So vivid were the memories of 1966 for England fans that a media clamour ensued for England to wear red jerseys, instead of the unfamiliar-looking grey away kit that had been launched earlier that year (as England had not submitted details of any red kit to UEFA before the tournament, this was never going to be permitted, and England did wear grey).

The build-up to the game was soured, however, by headlines in English tabloid newspapers which were regarded by many as overly nationalistic, and even racist in tone, as they had also been before the previous match against Spain. Particularly controversial was the Daily Mirror's headline "Achtung! Surrender! For You Fritz, ze Euro 96 Championship is over", accompanied by a mock article aping a report of the declaration of war between the two nations in 1939. The editor of the paper, Piers Morgan, subsequently apologised for the headline, particularly as it was at least partially blamed for violence following England's defeat, including a riot in Trafalgar Square.

England took the lead in only the third minute, through tournament top scorer Alan Shearer, but in the 16th minute Stefan Kuntz equalised, and despite many close shots and a disallowed goal from the Germans, the score remained level at 1–1 until the end of extra time. The match was settled by another penalty shoot-out, as in 1990, and although this time all five of England's initial penalty-takers were successful, so were all five German players. The shoot-out carried on to "sudden death" kicks, with Gareth Southgate missing for England and Andreas Möller scoring for Germany to put the hosts out. As in 1990, Germany went on to win the tournament.

Also the FA cancelled a friendly with Germany as it was pencilled for 20 April 1994 as it coincided with the 105th anniversary of Hitler's birth and was to have been played at the Berlin Olympic Stadium, the venue for the controversial and Nazi-politicized 1936 Summer Olympics.

=== 2000–2009: 2002 FIFA World Cup qualifier ===
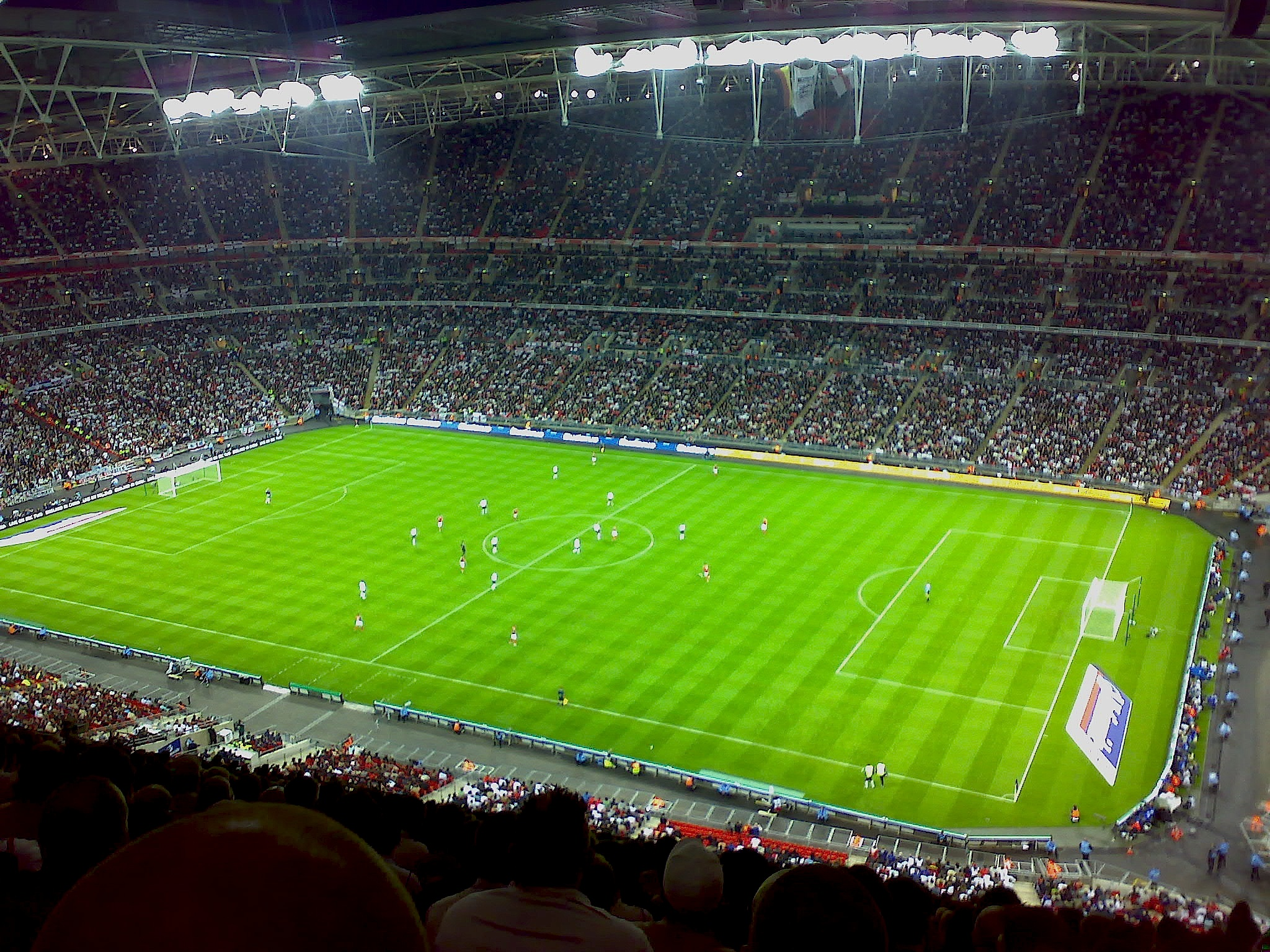
Friendly match between England and Germany at Wembley Stadium on 22 August 2007

England and Germany were drawn to meet each other in the first round group stage of the Euro 2000. Before the game, played on 17 June 2000 in Charleroi, there were violent incidents involving England fans in the town centre, although these were mostly brief and there were no violent confrontations with German fans. Nonetheless, reporting of the violence did to a degree overshadow the match result in some media coverage.

The match itself was a scrappy affair that lacked the drama of many of the previous encounters, with England securing a 1–0 win thanks to a second-half header by striker Alan Shearer. There was enthusiastic celebration of this result in England, particularly as this was the first time that England had won a competitive match against Germany since the 1966 World Cup final. The German reaction was more pessimistic. Rounding up the German media coverage, The Guardian reported: "'0–1! Germany weeps. Is it all over?' asked the mass circulation Bild newspaper in a front-page banner headline. 'Shearer tells us to pack our bags,' wrote Berlin's Der Tagesspiegel." Ultimately, both England and Germany lost their final group matches and were knocked out in the first round, finishing third and fourth respectively in their group.

England and Germany had also been drawn together in the same qualifying group for the 2002 FIFA World Cup. England's home match against Germany was played on 7 October 2000, and was significant as it was the last international fixture ever to be played at the old Wembley Stadium, before it was demolished and rebuilt. England lost 1–0 to a German free kick scored by Dietmar Hamann. "It was the last refuge of the inadequate. Half-time neared, England were a goal down and a sizeable section of the crowd sullied the ever-dampening occasion. 'Stand up if you won the War,' they sang", wrote journalist Ian Ridley in his match report for The Observer.

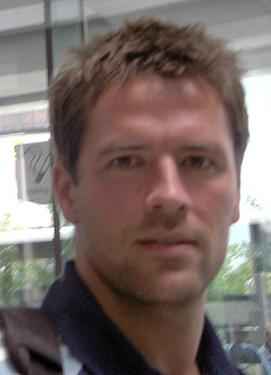
English striker Michael Owen scored a hat-trick against Germany in 2001.

The result prompted the immediate resignation of England manager Kevin Keegan, and by the time the return match was played at the Olympic Stadium in Munich on 1 September 2001, England were now managed by their first ever foreign coach, Sven-Göran Eriksson. Expectations on the English side were low, but they surprisingly won the game 5–1 with a hat-trick from striker Michael Owen, and eventually qualified for the World Cup as the winners of their group. Some Germans were shocked by the scale of the defeat, with former striker Karl-Heinz Rummenigge stating that "I have never seen such a terrible defeat ... This is a new Waterloo for us."

England and Germany next played on 22 August 2007, in a friendly at the newly rebuilt Wembley Stadium. England lost the match 2–1, their first defeat at the new Wembley, with Germany, following the unexpectedly successful 2006 World Cup, still rebuilding the national team. Then in a friendly held on 19 November 2008, England inflicted Germany's first defeat in Berlin in thirty-five years with a 2–1 victory.

=== 2010–2019: 2010 FIFA World Cup ===
In the 2010 FIFA World Cup, the two teams met at the round of 16 stage after Germany had won Group D and England had finished second in Group C. Germany inflicted England's worst World Cup or European Championship defeat to date, winning the match 4–1 to advance to the quarter-finals. After Germany had raced into a 2–0 lead thanks to Miroslav Klose and Lukas Podolski, a Matthew Upson header halved the deficit for England. Moments later, a shot by Frank Lampard bounced off the crossbar and over the goal line. However, neither the referee Jorge Larrionda nor the linesman granted the goal, leading to significant protests from the English technical team. After Lampard came close by hitting the bar early in the second half, two goals from Thomas Müller sealed Germany's progression to the next round. Writing in the BBC, author Phil McNulty said "England, with some justification, will bemoan their luck but nothing must disguise the manner in which they were outclassed by Germany in stages of this game and also what has been an ultimately bitterly disappointing World Cup campaign in South Africa."

Immediately after the match, parallels were drawn between Lampard's effort and Geoff Hurst's goal in the 1966 World Cup final. However, in the 2010 case there was no dispute about whether the ball had crossed the goal line, because the ball had clearly touched the grass well within the goal, and the television replay immediately showed this. Following the match, the President of FIFA Sepp Blatter apologised to England for the incident, adding that it had convinced him to reopen the debate on goal line technology use in football.

Following Germany's 1–0 win over England in a friendly at Wembley in November 2013, German tabloid Bild humorously declared on its front cover that "Wembley is now German".

=== 2020–present: UEFA Euro 2020 and beyond ===
On 29 June 2021, England defeated Germany in the UEFA Euro 2020 round of 16 match 2–0, thanks to two late goals from Raheem Sterling and Harry Kane. This was England's first knockout stage tournament win against Germany since 1966.

== Comparison of England and Germany in major international tournaments ==
Key

Denotes which team finished better in that particular competition.
DNQ: Did not qualify.
DNP: Did not participate.
TBD: To be determined.

Tournament	England	Germany	Notes
1930 FIFA World Cup	DNP	DNP	
1934 FIFA World Cup	DNP	3rd	
1938 FIFA World Cup	DNP	10th	German team included Austrian players as a result of the Anschluss.
1950 FIFA World Cup	8th	DNP	German teams were still banned as a result of World War II.
1954 FIFA World Cup	7th	1st	First tournament where only West Germany was represented.
1958 FIFA World Cup	11th	4th	
UEFA Euro 1960	DNP		
1962 FIFA World Cup	8th	7th	
UEFA Euro 1964	DNQ	DNP	
1966 FIFA World Cup	1st	2nd	Tournament hosted by England. In the final, England defeated West Germany 4–2 after extra time.
UEFA Euro 1968	3rd	DNQ	This remains the only World Cup or European Championship tournament where a German team (west or reunified) went out in the qualifying stages.
1970 FIFA World Cup	8th	3rd	In the quarter-finals, West Germany defeated England 3–2 after extra time.
UEFA Euro 1972	DNQ	1st	In the final qualifying round (effectively a quarter-final) West Germany defeated England 3–1 on aggregate.
1974 FIFA World Cup	DNQ	1st	Tournament hosted by West Germany. This tournament is the only World Cup or European Championship where East Germany qualified.
UEFA Euro 1976	DNQ	2nd	
1978 FIFA World Cup	DNQ	6th	
UEFA Euro 1980	6th	1st	
1982 FIFA World Cup	6th	2nd	In the second group stage, West Germany drew 0–0 with England.
UEFA Euro 1984	DNQ	5th	
1986 FIFA World Cup	8th	2nd	
UEFA Euro 1988	7th	3rd	Tournament hosted by West Germany
1990 FIFA World Cup	4th	1st	In the semi-finals, West Germany defeated England on penalty shoot-out.
UEFA Euro 1992	7th	2nd	First tournament since World War II to feature a reunified German team
1994 FIFA World Cup	DNQ	5th	
UEFA Euro 1996	3rd	1st	Tournament hosted by England. In the semi-finals, Germany defeated England on penalty shoot-out.
1998 FIFA World Cup	9th	7th	
UEFA Euro 2000	11th	15th	England and Germany were placed in the same first round group. Both were eliminated, with England finishing third and Germany fourth. England defeated Germany 1–0 in the match between the two teams.
2002 FIFA World Cup	6th	2nd	England and Germany were placed in the same qualifying group. Germany won 1–0 at Wembley, while England won 5–1 in Munich.
UEFA Euro 2004	5th	12th	
2006 FIFA World Cup	7th	3rd	Tournament hosted by Germany
UEFA Euro 2008	DNQ	2nd	
2010 FIFA World Cup	13th	3rd	In the round of 16, Germany defeated England 4–1.
UEFA Euro 2012	5th	3rd	
2014 FIFA World Cup	26th	1st	
UEFA Euro 2016	12th	3rd	
2018 FIFA World Cup	4th	22nd	
UEFA Euro 2020	2nd	15th	Tournament hosted by multiple countries, Germany and England hosted some matches. In the round of 16, England defeated Germany 2–0.
2022 FIFA World Cup	6th	17th	
UEFA Euro 2024	2nd	5th	Tournament hosted by Germany.
2026 FIFA World Cup	3rd	18th	
UEFA Euro 2028	TBD	TBD	England will host several games in this tournament alongside Scotland, Wales and the Republic of Ireland.

Team performed better in the tournament

=== Summary ===
Team	FIFA World Cup			UEFA European Championship		
Team	Champions	Runners-up	Top 3 total	Champions	Runners-up	Top 4 total
England	1	0	2	0	2	4
Germany	4	4	12	3	3	9

== Women's football ==
=== Club football ===
The German women's league is considered one of the strongest in the world. By the end of the 2021–22, German clubs had won nine Champions League titles, while an English club had won the competition on two occasions (Arsenal in 2007 and 2025).

=== National teams ===
The German women's team was generally more popular in Germany than the English women's team is in England. Germany matches were televised on national television and attracted millions of viewers. The World Cup 2011 quarter-final between Germany and Japan attracted over 17 million viewers, while England women's matches struggled to even make it into television schedules.

England's group games in the World Cup 2011 were watched by up to four million viewers on German television, but less than a million on BBC, which means even with no German involvement, England games were at that point more popular in Germany than in the country the England team actually represents. Observers noted that this gap in popularity was not just due to a lack of gender equality in England, but to the fact that the success of the German women's team meant that there was much more media coverage and interest.

England had not won a major title until they won Euro 2022, their best result beforehand being Euro runners up in women's Euro 1984 and in Euro 2009. Meanwhile, Germany's women have won two World Cups, 2003 and 2007, a total of eight European Championships in the years of 1989, 1991, 1995, 1997, 2001, 2005, 2009 and 2013 and the 2016 Summer Olympics.

Along with Spain, Germany is the only nation to have won both the men's and women's FIFA World Cup, and the only women's team to win the European Championship a year after the men's team won (in 1996 and 1997). On 4 July 2015, England upset Germany 1–0 in the match for third place at the 2015 FIFA Women's World Cup; this was their first ever victory against Germany in 21 matches. The two sides met in the 2022 Arnold Clark Cup, when England won 3–1 at Molineux Stadium, and the UEFA Women's Euro 2022 final at Wembley Stadium, with England won 2–1 to secure their first ever major title.

== Media and public reactions ==
=== England ===
Germany may beat us at our national sport today, but that would be only fair. We beat them twice at theirs.

— Vincent Mulchrone of The Daily Mail, before the 1966 World Cup final.

Since World War II, England has considered itself a rival to Germany in many areas, such as automobile production, naval forces, trade and economy—this rivalry has also permeated into football.

English football fans often deem Germany to be their traditional football rival and care more about this rivalry than those with other countries, such as Scotland or Argentina. In the run-up to any football match against Germany, many English tabloids publish articles that contain references to the Second World War, such as calling their opposition derogatory terms such as "krauts" or "hun".

Two days before the UEFA Euro 1996 semi-final, The Daily Mirror published an article on its front page that ran with the headline "Achtung! Surrender!": another reference to the war. After the 5–1 victory over Germany in 2001, the English news media were ecstatic. The Sunday Mirror drew more comparisons to World War II, by running an article about the game on the front page under the headline "BLITZED".

Germany's defeat by England in the 1966 World Cup has often been voted by the English as their greatest ever sporting moment, and the 5–1 victory in 2001 has also regularly placed highly. England's Manchester United defeating Germany's Bayern Munich at the 1999 UEFA Champions League final is also highly regarded by English football fans as a high point in their perceived rivalry. The rivalry has also made its way into various aspects of English popular culture. For example, in the 1970s BBC television series Whatever Happened to the Likely Lads?, the character Terry remarks that 14 June 1970, the day that England lost 3–2 to West Germany, should be "indelibly printed on every true Englishman's mind".

England player and broadcaster Gary Lineker notoriously said "Football is a simple game; 22 men chase a ball for 90 minutes and at the end, the Germans win." He would paraphrase himself following the final of the UEFA Women's Euro 2022, saying: "Football is a simple game. 22 women chase a ball for 90 minutes and, at the end, England actually win."

=== Germany ===
As far back as the 1960s, the footballing rivalry between England and Germany has been considered mainly an English phenomenon; this has been observed by several commentators of both English and German origin. In June 2009, British comedian Stephen Fry stated on the BBC show QI that, unlike the English, German football fans do not care about their team's loss at the 1966 World Cup final and may not even remember that they had made it that far. Instead, German fans consider their rivalry with the Netherlands to be their traditional footballing rivalry and care more about the matches against them, such as the 1974 FIFA World Cup final.

Following their 5–1 loss in 2001, many German fans were not particularly concerned, instead revelling in the Netherlands' defeat by the Republic of Ireland the same day. Some sang directly after the loss to England: "Ohne Holland fahr'n wir zur WM" ("We're going to the World Cup without Holland!"), which was eventually made into a German Schlager song.

In 2010, during the lead-up to 2010 World Cup match, journalist Marina Hyde remarked in The Guardian that the rivalry between the England and Germany football teams was "quite obviously an illusion, existing only in the minds of those wishful to the point of insanity – which is to say, the English". She added: "In a world that has changed bewilderingly in recent decades, England losing to Germany in major tournaments is one of the few certainties." Similarly, professor Peter J. Beck described Germany's ambivalence to the rivalry, saying that "as far as the Germans are concerned, Sunday's game is nothing more than another sporting contest".

However, it would also be false to say that there is no rivalry at all between England and Germany; for one thing, the very fact that the English perceive it to be such cannot go unnoticed, for another, there is the long-standing quarrel about the "Wembley goal" (only somewhat silenced since a clear goal was not awarded to the English in 2010). England vs. Germany matches, even friendlies, are always considered highly important sporting events (though the tradition and, usually, the quality of both the teams may account for most of that), going so far that a popular radioplay series mocks people in love as "looking deep into each other's eyes even if a England vs. Germany match is on TV". However, any feeling of rivalry towards England, if existent, is dwarfed by the German-Dutch rivalry.

== List of matches ==
=== Unofficial internationals ===
English teams played a number of games against German teams between 1899 and 1911. The first of these, encompassing an official Football Association tour of Germany and Austria in 1899, and a reciprocal tour of England by a German select squad, saw the English teams feature a mix of amateurs and professionals playing against German sides organised by regional associations, even after the foundation of the DFB in 1901. The games played between 1908 and 1913 saw the official German national team, organised by the DFB, play against the England Amateur side.

No	Date	Venue	Competition	Result		
1	23 November 1899	(German Empire) Sportpark Kurfürstendamm, Berlin	Friendly	Germany	2–13	England
2	24 November 1899	(German Empire) Sportpark Kurfürstendamm, Berlin	Friendly	Germany	2–10	England
3	28 November 1899	(German Empire) Exerzierplatz, Karlsruhe	Friendly	Germany	0–7	England
4	21 September 1901	(England) White Hart Lane, London	Friendly	England	12–0	Germany
5	28 November 1899	(England) Hyde Road, Manchester	Friendly	England	10–0	Germany
6	20 April 1908	(German Empire) Viktoria-Platz, Berlin	Friendly	Germany	1–5	England
7	16 March 1909	(England) White House Ground, Oxford	Friendly	England	9–0	Germany
8	4 April 1911	(German Empire) Viktoria-Platz, Berlin	Friendly	Germany	2–2	England
9	21 March 1913	(German Empire) Viktoria-Platz, Berlin	Friendly	Germany	0–3	England

Note that matches 6–9 Germany awarded caps against the England amateur team.

=== Full internationals ===
As of 26 September 2022

==== Overview ====
Type	Matches	(England)	Draw	(Germany)
UEFA European Championship*	5	2	2	1
FIFA World Cup*	7	2	2	3
UEFA Nations League	2	0	2	0
All competitive	14	4	6	4
Friendly	21	10	2	9
Total	35	14	8	13

* Euro and World Cup matchups include qualifiers. Penalty shoot-outs are recorded as draws, in which Germany defeated England 4–3 in 1990 and 6–5 in 1996.

Venue	(England)	(Germany)	Draw
White Hart Lane, London	1	0	0
Wembley Stadium, London	5	6	3
Matches in England	6	6	3
Deutsches Stadion, Berlin	0	0	1
Olympiastadion, Berlin	4	0	1
(Bavaria) Städtisches Stadion, Nuremberg	1	0	0
(Lower Saxony) Niedersachsenstadion, Hanover	0	1	0
(Bavaria) Olympiastadion, Munich	1	1	0
(North Rhine-Westphalia) Rheinstadion, Düsseldorf	0	1	0
(North Rhine-Westphalia) Westfalenstadion, Dortmund	0	1	0
(Bavaria) Allianz Arena, Munich	0	0	1
Matches in Germany	6	4	3
Neutral matches	2	3	2

==== Matches ====
No	Date	Venue	Competition	Result			Head to Head
1	10 May 1930	(Weimar Republic) Deutsches Stadion, Berlin	Friendly Match	Germany	3–3	England	–
2	4 December 1935	(England) White Hart Lane, London	Friendly Match	England	3–0	Germany	England 1
3	14 May 1938	(Nazi Germany) Olympiastadion, Berlin	Friendly Match	Germany	3–6	England	England 2
4	1 December 1954	(England) Wembley Stadium, London	Friendly Match	England	3–1	West Germany	England 3
5	26 May 1956	(West Germany) Olympiastadion, West Berlin	Friendly Match	West Germany	1–3	England	England 4
6	12 May 1965	(West Germany) Städtisches Stadion, Nuremberg	Friendly Match	West Germany	0–1	England	England 5
7	23 February 1966	(England) Wembley Stadium, London	Friendly Match	England	1–0	West Germany	England 6
8	30 July 1966	(England) Wembley Stadium, London	1966 FIFA World Cup final	England	4–2 (a.e.t.)	West Germany	England 7
9	1 June 1968	(West Germany) Niedersachsenstadion, Hanover	Friendly Match	West Germany	1–0	England	Germany 1
10	14 June 1970	(Mexico) Estadio León, León	1970 FIFA World Cup quarter-final	West Germany	3–2 (a.e.t.)	England	Germany 2
11	29 April 1972	(England) Wembley Stadium, London	UEFA Euro 1972 qualifier quarter-final	England	1–3	West Germany	Germany 3
12	13 May 1972	(West Germany) Olympiastadion, West Berlin	UEFA Euro 1972 qualifier quarter-final	West Germany	0–0	England	–
13	12 March 1975	(England) Wembley Stadium, London	Friendly Match	England	2–0	West Germany	England 8
14	22 February 1978	(West Germany) Olympiastadion, Munich	Friendly Match	West Germany	2–1	England	Germany 4
15	29 June 1982	(Spain) Santiago Bernabéu Stadium, Madrid	1982 FIFA World Cup second group stage	West Germany	0–0	England	–
16	13 October 1982	(England) Wembley Stadium, London	Friendly Match	England	1–2	West Germany	Germany 5
17	12 June 1985	(Mexico) Estadio Azteca, Mexico City	Azteca 2000 Tournament	England	3–0	West Germany	England 9
18	9 September 1987	(West Germany) Rheinstadion, Düsseldorf	Friendly Match	West Germany	3–1	England	Germany 6
19	4 July 1990	(Italy) Stadio delle Alpi, Turin	1990 FIFA World Cup semi-final	West Germany	1–1 (a.e.t.) (4–3 p)	England	–
20	11 September 1991	(England) Wembley Stadium, London	Friendly Match	England	0–1	Germany	Germany 7
21	19 June 1993	(United States) Pontiac Silverdome, Pontiac	1993 U.S. Cup	Germany	2–1	England	Germany 8
22	26 June 1996	(England) Wembley Stadium, London	UEFA Euro 1996 semi-final	Germany	1–1 (a.e.t.) (6–5 p)	England	–
23	17 June 2000	(Belgium) Stade du Pays de Charleroi, Charleroi	UEFA Euro 2000 group stage	England	1–0	Germany	England 10
24	7 October 2000	(England) Wembley Stadium, London	2002 FIFA World Cup qualification	England	0–1	Germany	Germany 9
25	1 September 2001	(Germany) Olympiastadion, Munich	2002 FIFA World Cup qualification	Germany	1–5	England	England 11
26	22 August 2007	(England) Wembley Stadium, London	Friendly Match	England	1–2	Germany	Germany 10
27	19 November 2008	(Germany) Olympiastadion, Berlin	Friendly Match	Germany	1–2	England	England 12
28	27 June 2010	(South Africa) Free State Stadium, Bloemfontein	2010 FIFA World Cup round of 16	Germany	4–1	England	Germany 11
29	19 November 2013	(England) Wembley Stadium, London	Friendly Match	England	0–1	Germany	Germany 12
30	26 March 2016	(Germany) Olympiastadion, Berlin	Friendly Match	Germany	2–3	England	England 13
31	22 March 2017	(Germany) Westfalenstadion, Dortmund	Friendly Match	Germany	1–0	England	Germany 13
32	10 November 2017	(England) Wembley Stadium, London	Friendly Match	England	0–0	Germany	–
33	29 June 2021	(England) Wembley Stadium, London	UEFA Euro 2020 round of 16	England	2–0	Germany	England 14
34	7 June 2022	(Germany) Allianz Arena, Munich	2022–23 UEFA Nations League A	Germany	1–1	England	–
35	26 September 2022	(England) Wembley Stadium, London	2022–23 UEFA Nations League A	England	3–3	Germany	–

Note: Since 1908, Germany is represented by the German Football Association (DFB) which fields the Germany national football team. During German division (1949–1990), the team of the German Football Association based in Frankfurt, Federal Republic of Germany was colloquially called West Germany.

#	German	Years
Imperial Germany	Deutsches Reich	until 1919
Weimar Germany	Deutsches Reich	1919–1933
Nazi Germany	Deutsches Reich	1933–1945
West Germany	Bundesrepublik Deutschland	1949–1990
Reunited Germany	Bundesrepublik Deutschland	since 1990

== East German national team ==
England played four matches against East Germany (1949–1990), all of which were friendly matches.

List of matches:

No	Date	Venue	Competition	Result			Ref
1	2 July 1963	(East Germany) Zentralstadion, Leipzig	Friendly	East Germany	1–2	England	
2	25 November 1970	(England) Wembley Stadium, London	Friendly	England	3–1	East Germany	
3	29 May 1974	(East Germany) Zentralstadion, Leipzig	Friendly	East Germany	1–1	England	
4	12 September 1984	(England) Wembley Stadium, London	Friendly	England	1–0	East Germany	

All-time record

(England) win	Draw	(East Germany) win
3	1	0

== Club level ==
As well as the rivalry between the national sides, English and German club teams have also met on numerous occasions in the various European club competitions. The English hold the upper hand in club football encounters.

=== Finals ===
Other memorable matches were the controversial 1975 European Cup final in which Bayern beat Leeds United after the latter had penalty claims turned down by a French referee who also disallowed a goal scored by Peter Lorimer with a shot from outside the area. Apart from the 1977 European Cup final, Liverpool beat Mönchengladbach, they also met in the 1973 UEFA Cup final and the 1978 European Cup semi-final. Liverpool had defeated four German sides on their way to victory in their 1973 win. In the final first leg at Anfield, Liverpool won 3–0, only for Borussia Mönchengladbach to pull back to 3–2 on aggregate by half-time. The Reds hung on in the second half. Aston Villa defeated FC Bayern Munich in 1982 European Cup final in Rotterdam.

In the memorable 1999 UEFA Champions League final between Manchester United and Bayern Munich, United were trailing 1–0 until they scored two late goals in injury time to win 2–1.

On 19 May 2012, Bayern Munich met Chelsea in the 2012 UEFA Champions League final. Bayern Munich suffered defeat at the Allianz Arena; a game dubbed "Finale dahoam" (Bavarian for "final at home") as it marked the second time that any team played the tournament's final at their home ground. The game ended as a 1–1 draw after extra time before being decided 4–3 on penalties. Bayern Munich seemed like the more dominant of the two sides throughout, but could not break down Chelsea's defence.

Borussia Dortmund's wins over holders West Ham United and Liverpool (final in Glasgow) in the 1965–66 European Cup Winners' Cup were memorable as were West Ham's win over TSV 1860 Munich at Wembley Stadium in the final of the same competition a year earlier. Chelsea also defeated VfB Stuttgart in the final of 1998.

=== Other notable matches ===
Leeds would eventually eliminate a German team (VfB Stuttgart) in unexpected and bizarre circumstances. After the Germans had qualified, in the first round of the 1992–93 UEFA Champions League, on the away goals rule, the return leg was awarded by UEFA 3–0 to Leeds United because Stuttgart fielded an extra foreigner, thus infringing the European competition rules that were in place at the time. A replay was ordered as the aggregate stood at 3–3. Leeds won the replay at Barcelona's Camp Nou 2–1.

Borussia Dortmund beat Manchester United 1–0 both home and away in the semi-final of the 1996–97 UEFA Champions League which they won, United having been guilty of squandering numerous chances in both legs, especially the return leg at Old Trafford. In the 2015–16 UEFA Champions League, Bayern Munich defeated Arsenal 5–1 in the group stage. In the next year's competition they met again in the round of 16, where Bayern repeated the scoreline home and away for a 10–2 aggregate victory. On 1 October 2019, Bayern thrashed Tottenham Hotspur 7–2 win in a 2019–20 UEFA Champions League match.

The outspoken Brian Clough is on record boasting that he never lost to a German side and that he took satisfaction from this for what the Germans had done to his father during the war. Clough memorably led Nottingham Forest to a 1–0 win in Cologne following a 3–3 draw at the City Ground in the 1979 semi-final en route to Forest winning their first European Cup. There were also some encounters between English league sides and clubs from East Germany which mostly ended in favour of the English sides, although these confrontations were less spectacular than those involving clubs from West Germany. However, Nottingham Forest under Clough lost 0-1 at home to BFC Dynamo in the quarter-finals of the 1979-80 European Cup in 1980. The match was historic as it saw BFC Dynamo became the first German team to defeat an English team in England in the European Cup.

== Players ==
The rivalry between the two nations has not prevented their respective nationals from playing in each other's domestic leagues, many notable German players have played in England, including Bert Trautmann (Manchester City), Jürgen Klinsmann (Tottenham Hotspur), Jens Lehmann (Arsenal), Michael Ballack (Chelsea), Mesut Özil (Arsenal), Lukas Podolski (Arsenal), Jérôme Boateng (Manchester City), Bastian Schweinsteiger (Manchester United), Florian Wirtz (Liverpool) and İlkay Gündoğan (Manchester City). Trautmann was voted Football Writers' Association Footballer of the Year in 1956 for continuing to play in goal for Manchester City in the 1956 FA Cup final despite a neck injury. Klinsmann was voted the same accolade in 1995 while playing for Tottenham, where he pioneered the 'diving' goal celebration.

Fewer Englishmen have played in Germany, with notable players being Kevin Keegan (Hamburger SV), Jude Bellingham (Borussia Dortmund), Owen Hargreaves (Bayern Munich) and Jadon Sancho (Borussia Dortmund). Keegan won two consecutive Ballon d'Or awards and was a European Cup finalist during his time at Hamburg. In 2023, England's captain and all-time highest goalscorer, Harry Kane joined Bayern Munich from Tottenham Hotspur.

== See also ==
- Germany–Netherlands football rivalry
- Argentina–England football rivalry
- England–Scotland football rivalry
- France–Germany football rivalry
- England–Ireland football rivalry
- Germany–Italy football rivalry
- English football club rivalries
- German football rivalries
