= Pantani: The Accidental Death of a Cyclist =

2014 film

- DVD cover of Pantani: The Accidental Death of a Cyclist
- Directed by: James Erskine
- Produced by: James Erskine; Victoria Gregory
- Starring: Andrea Gambadoro; Conan Sweeny
- Cinematography: Joel Devlin
- Edited by: Arturo Calvete
- Music by: Lorne Balfe
- Release date: February 2014 (Italy)
- Running time: 96 minutes
- Languages: English; Italian

Pantani: The Accidental Death of a Cyclist is a 2014 feature-length documentary film directed by James Erskine. It is about the life and death of road racing cyclist Marco Pantani.

Pantani: The Accidental Death of a Cyclist was averagely received, mostly because of the too much sympathetic representation with regards to the accusation of doping. The Guardian gave the documentary three stars out of five, praising the "thrilling footage' but criticising how "it can't close the book on the doping allegations." Similarly, The Huffington Post stated that the director tended to eschew exploring Pantani's dark side in favor of focusing on his achievements. Time Out gave the documentary 3 stars out of five, describing Pantani's depiction much softer than most media accounts of Lance Armstrong.

On review aggregator Rotten Tomatoes, the film holds an approval rating of 84% based on 19 reviews, with an average rating of 6.29/10.

== See also ==
- List of films about bicycles and cycling
