= Ervin Fakaj =

Albanian footballer

Personal information
- Full name: Ervin Pëllumb Fakaj
- Date of birth: 15 June 1976 (age 50)
- Place of birth: Vlorë, Albania
- Height: 1.83 m (6 ft 0 in)
- Position: Centre-back

Youth career
- 1990–1992: Flamurtari

Senior career*
Years	Team	Apps	(Gls)
1992–1997	Flamurtari	99	(16)
1997–1998	Toledo	5	(0)
1998	Eintracht Nordhorn	5	(0)
1999	Hannover 96	6	(0)
1999–2000	SV Meppen	20	(1)
2000–2001	EN Paralimni	17	(0)
2001–2002	Genk	2	(0)
2002–2003	MSV Duisburg	6	(0)
2003–2004	Tirana		
2004–2005	Partizani	0	(0)

International career
1995–2002	Albania	25	(1)
- * Club domestic league appearances and goals

Ervin Pëllumb Fakaj (born 15 June 1976) is an Albanian retired professional footballer who played as a centre-back. He made 25 appearances and scored one goal for the Albania national team.

== Club career ==
Born in Vlorë, Fakaj had spells in Spain, Cyprus and Germany, before ending up in Belgium with Racing Genk, where he lined up alongside Besnik Hasi.

== International career ==
Fakaj made his debut for the Albania national team in an August 1995 friendly match away against Malta and earned a total of 25 caps, scoring one goal. His final international was an October 2002 European Championship qualification match against Russia in Volgograd.

== Career statistics ==
Appearances and goals by national team and year
National team	Year	Apps	Goals
Albania	1995	1	0
Albania	1996	1	0
Albania	1997	3	0
Albania	1998	5	0
Albania	1999	4	0
Albania	2000	4	1
Albania	2001	3	0
Albania	2002	4	0
Total		25	1
