= Marko Rehmer =

German former professional footballer (born 1972)

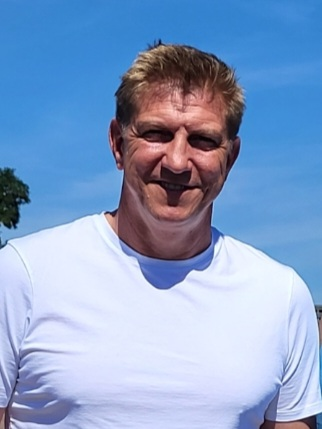
- Rehmer in 2022

Personal information
- Full name: Marko Rehmer
- Date of birth: 29 April 1972 (age 54)
- Place of birth: East Berlin, East Germany
- Height: 1.88 m (6 ft 2 in)
- Position: Right-back

Youth career
- 1978–1979: Empor HO Berlin
- 1979–1980: TZ Prenzlauer Berg
- 1980–1990: Union Berlin

Senior career*
Years	Team	Apps	(Gls)
1990–1997	Union Berlin	106	(19)
1997–1999	Hansa Rostock	81	(4)
1999–2005	Hertha BSC	107	(6)
2005–2007	Eintracht Frankfurt	37	(2)
Total		331	(31)

International career
1998–2003	Germany	35	(4)
Medal record
Representing Germany
Men's football
FIFA World Cup
Runner-up	2002 Korea/Japan
- * Club domestic league appearances and goals

Marko Rehmer (born 29 April 1972) is a German former professional footballer who played mainly as a right-back.

== Club career ==
Rehmer was born in East Berlin. In his youth he played for hometown 1. FC Union Berlin; he arrived in the first division at almost 25, joining former East Germany's Hansa Rostock during the 1997 winter transfer window. He was crucial for the side during his two half-seasons spell, as it always maintained its top level status.

For the following six years, Rehmer played with another club from his city, Hertha BSC; being an important defensive unit as the side always made the UEFA Cup in the first four seasons, he was also grossly undermined by several injuries.

In 2005, Rehmer moved to Eintracht Frankfurt. Following more injuries, he was forced to retire at the end of 2006–07, after helping with 12 matches in the team's final escape from relegation.

== International career ==
Rehmer got 35 caps for Germany during five years, scoring four times. His debut came on 2 September 1998, in a 2–1 friendly win in Malta.

His best years were 2000–01, as he played in 20 internationals, including twice at UEFA Euro 2000, where the national side – the holders – were ousted in the group stages; he was also summoned to the 2002 FIFA World Cup, getting a runners-up medal with his 45 minutes against Paraguay, in the round of 16 (1–0).

=== International goals ===
Scores and results list Germany's goal tally first, score column indicates score after each Rehmer goal.

List of international goals scored by Marko Rehmer
No.	Date	Venue	Opponent	Score	Result	Competition
1	29 March 2000	Maksimir, Zagreb	Croatia	1–0	1–1	Friendly
2	28 March 2001	Olympic Stadium, Athens	Greece	1–0	4–2	2002 FIFA World Cup Qualification
3	6 June 2001	Selman Stërmasi Stadium, Tirana	Albania	1–0	2–0	2002 FIFA World Cup Qualification
4	14 November 2001	Olimpiyskyi National Sports Complex, Kyiv	Ukraine	3–0	4–1	2002 FIFA World Cup Qualification

== Honours ==
Hertha BSC

- DFB-Ligapokal: 2001, 2002; runner-up 2000

Eintracht Frankfurt

- DFB-Pokal: runner-up 2005–06

Germany

- FIFA World Cup: runner-up 2002
