= Nejc Pečnik =

Slovenian footballer (born 1986)

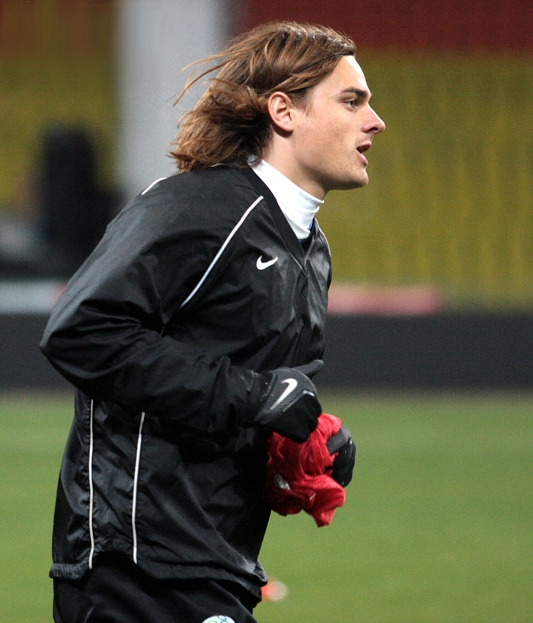
- Pečnik with Slovenia in 2009

Personal information
- Date of birth: 3 January 1986 (age 40)
- Place of birth: Dravograd, SR Slovenia, SFR Yugoslavia
- Height: 1.89 m (6 ft 2 in)
- Positions: Attacking midfielder; winger

Team information
- Current team: Dravograd

Youth career
- 1991–2003: Dravograd
- 2003–2005: Celje

Senior career*
Years	Team	Apps	(Gls)
2003–2009	Celje	120	(21)
2004–2005	→ Dravograd (loan)	7	(2)
2008–2009	→ Sparta Prague (loan)	4	(0)
2009–2012	Nacional	37	(2)
2011	→ Krylia Sovetov (loan)	21	(1)
2012–2013	Sheffield Wednesday	10	(0)
2013–2014	Red Star Belgrade	43	(9)
2015	JEF United Chiba	39	(14)
2016–2017	Omiya Ardija	27	(1)
2017–2018	Tochigi SC	34	(8)
2018–2020	Dravograd	49	(24)
2021–2022	SC Eibiswald	7	(4)
2022–2023	Dravograd	27	(8)
2024–2025	ASC St. Paul	34	(27)
2025–	Dravograd		

International career
2001	Slovenia U15	5	(0)
2006–2007	Slovenia U20	3	(1)
2005–2008	Slovenia U21	20	(2)
2009–2015	Slovenia	32	(6)
- * Club domestic league appearances and goals

Nejc Pečnik (born 3 January 1986) is a Slovenian footballer who plays for Dravograd. Primarily an attacking midfielder, he also plays as a winger or forward.

He represented Slovenia at the 2010 FIFA World Cup. He was instrumental in Slovenia's successful qualification to the tournament by scoring an away goal against Russia in the 2010 World Cup qualification play-offs.

== Club career ==
=== Celje ===
Born in Dravograd, Slovenia (then part of Yugoslavia), Pečnik started his career at hometown club Dravograd. After showing promise in its youth teams he was signed by Celje, making his first division debut on 24 April 2004 against Ljubljana.

The following year Pečnik played in only seven league matches, adding a few cup appearances including the final against Gorica. In the 2005–06 season he managed to gain a regular place in the first team, eventually establishing himself as a key offensive player.

In 2007–08, Pečnik was Celje's top scorer with 14 league goals. After five seasons he was loaned out in June 2008 to Sparta Prague, but appeared rarely with the Czech first division outfit during his six-month stay, spending most of his time with the reserve squad.

=== Nacional ===
After a further 15 league games with Celje, Pečnik signed with Nacional of Portugal. On 16 July 2012, after three seasons of irregular playing time, also being loaned to Russian club Krylia Sovetov Samara for five months, he signed a two-year deal with Sheffield Wednesday in the Football League Championship.

=== Sheffield Wednesday ===
In his official debut with the Owls, on 12 August 2012, Pečnik missed a penalty and was booked before half-time, as his team trailed at Oldham Athletic 2–0. He played the full 90 minutes in an eventual 4–2 win for the season's Football League Cup.

Pečnik was released by Wednesday at the end of his only campaign.

=== Red Star Belgrade ===
On 1 July 2013, Pečnik agreed a two-year contract with Serbian side Red Star Belgrade. He scored his first goal for Red Star against ÍBV in the second qualifying round of the 2013–14 UEFA Europa League.

== International career ==
Pečnik made his debut for the Slovenia national team on 1 April 2009, in a 2010 World Cup qualifier against Northern Ireland. He scored his first goal for Slovenia on 10 October 2009, during the same qualifying campaign, in a 2–0 win over Slovakia. On 14 November 2009, he scored a decisive away goal in the 2010 World Cup qualification play-offs, as Slovenia lost 2–1 against Russia at the Luzhniki Stadium, only to win 1–0 in the second leg, taking the tie on the away goals and qualifying for a World Cup for the second time in the nation's history; in the final stages, he appeared twice as a late substitute, having to be however stretchered off in the match against the United States. Overall, Pečnik earned a total of 32 caps, scoring 6 goals.

== Career statistics ==
=== Club ===
As of 31 December 2018

Appearances and goals by club, season and competition
Club	Season	League			National cup		Continental		Total	
Club	Season	Division	Apps	Goals	Apps	Goals	Apps	Goals	Apps	Goals
Celje	2003–04	Slovenian PrvaLiga	2	0	0	0	0	0	2	0
Celje	2004–05	Slovenian PrvaLiga	7	0	3	0	0	0	10	0
Celje	2005–06	Slovenian PrvaLiga	30	2	4	0	2	0	36	2
Celje	2006–07	Slovenian PrvaLiga	31	2	3	3	—		34	5
Celje	2007–08	Slovenian PrvaLiga	35	14	2	0	—		37	14
Celje	2008–09	Slovenian PrvaLiga	15	3	0	0	—		15	3
Sparta Prague (loan)	2008–09	Czech First League	4	0	0	0	2	0	6	0
Sparta Prague B (loan)	2008–09	Czech 2. Liga	9	2	—		—		9	2
Nacional	2009–10	Primeira Liga	24	2	6 (Note: Includes Taça da Liga and Taça de Portugal)	0	8	0	38	2
Nacional	2010–11	Primeira Liga	9	0	1	0	—		10	0
Nacional	2011–12	Primeira Liga	4	0	1	0	—		5	0
Krylia Sovetov (loan)	2011–12	Russian Premier League	21	1	1	0	—		22	1
Sheffield Wednesday	2012–13	Championship	10	0	4 (Note: Includes EFL Cup FA Cup)	0	—		14	0
Red Star Belgrade	2013–14	Serbian SuperLiga	28	7	3	1	4	1	35	9
Red Star Belgrade	2014–15	Serbian SuperLiga	15	2	1	0	—		16	2
JEF United Chiba	2015	J2 League	39	14	0	0	—		39	14
Omiya Ardija	2016	J1 League	21	1	10 (Note: Includes J.League Cup and Emperor's Cup)	4	—		31	5
Omiya Ardija	2017	J1 League	6	0	6	1	—		12	1
Tochigi SC	2017	J3 League	12	6	—		—		12	6
Tochigi SC	2018	J2 League	22	2	0	0	—		22	2
Career total			344	58	45	9	16	1	405	68

=== International ===
Scores and results list Slovenia's goal tally first, score column indicates score after each Pečnik goal.

List of international goals scored by Nejc Pečnik
No.	Date	Venue	Opponent	Score	Result	Competition
1	10 October 2009	Tehelné pole, Bratislava, Slovakia	Slovakia	2–0	2–0	2010 World Cup qualification
2	14 November 2009	Luzhniki Stadium, Moscow, Russia	Russia	1–2	1–2	2010 World Cup qualification playoffs
3	14 November 2012	Philip II Arena, Skopje, Macedonia	Macedonia	1–2	2–3	Friendly
4	14 November 2012	Philip II Arena, Skopje, Macedonia	Macedonia	2–3	2–3	Friendly
5	14 June 2015	Stožice Stadium, Ljubljana, Slovenia	England	2–2	2–3	UEFA Euro 2016 qualification
6	12 October 2015	San Marino Stadium, Serravalle, San Marino	San Marino	2–0	2–0	UEFA Euro 2016 qualification

== Honours ==
Celje

- Slovenian Cup: 2004–05

Red Star

- Serbian SuperLiga: 2013–14
