= 2010 FIFA World Cup qualification – UEFA second round =

Football tournament qualification stage

The UEFA second round was contested by the best eight runners-up from the nine first-round groups from the UEFA segment of the qualification tournament for the 2010 FIFA World Cup in football. The winners of each of four home and away ties joined the group winners in the World Cup in South Africa. The matches, which are often referred to as 'play-offs', were played on 14 and 18 November 2009. The draw for the ties was held in Zürich on 19 October, with the teams drawn by South African player Steven Pienaar.

== Qualification ==
The eight best runners-up from the UEFA first round qualified for the play-offs. As group 9 had five teams and the others had six, matches against the sixth-placed team in the group were not included in this ranking (although Norway ended up with the fewest points anyways)

Pos	Grp	Team	Pld	W	D	L	GF	GA	GD	Pts	Qualification
1	4	Russia	8	5	1	2	15	6	+9	16	Advance to second round (play-offs)
2	2	Greece	8	5	1	2	16	9	+7	16	Advance to second round (play-offs)
3	6	Ukraine	8	4	3	1	10	6	+4	15	Advance to second round (play-offs)
4	7	France	8	4	3	1	12	9	+3	15	Advance to second round (play-offs)
5	3	Slovenia	8	4	2	2	10	4	+6	14	Advance to second round (play-offs)
6	5	Bosnia and Herzegovina	8	4	1	3	19	12	+7	13	Advance to second round (play-offs)
7	1	Portugal	8	3	4	1	9	5	+4	13	Advance to second round (play-offs)
8	8	Republic of Ireland	8	2	6	0	8	6	+2	12	Advance to second round (play-offs)
9	9	Norway	8	2	4	2	9	7	+2	10	

== Seeding and draw ==
In September 2009, FIFA announced that they would be seeding teams for the play-off draw. The eight eventual qualifiers were seeded according to the world rankings released on 16 October 2009. The top four teams were placed into one pot, with the bottom four teams placed into a second. A separate draw was conducted between each matchup to decide the host of the first leg.

=== Seeding controversy ===
Seeding using FIFA ranks was used at a similar stage in the 2006 qualification. However, it was claimed that FIFA had indicated that there would be no seeding this time. At the time of the decision, countries in play-off positions included Russia, France and Portugal, and Germany also had not yet qualified (their last remaining match was away to Russia). The lack of a decision on seeding until late in the tournament led some to suggest that FIFA were waiting to see which teams were in the play-offs before declaring the rules of the tournament. Commenting on this matter, Republic of Ireland goalkeeper Shay Given said:

It’s totally unfair on us smaller nations. If they say that before a ball is kicked then at least you know the picture, you know exactly where you stand but to change it now is absolutely ridiculous and I don’t think it’s right at all.

Sports Illustrated's Gabriele Marcotti gave the opinion that "FIFA is pretty much changing the rules halfway through the qualifying tournament."

=== Seedings ===
The eight teams were seeded according to the FIFA World Rankings released on 16 October (shown in parentheses in the table below).

Pot 1 (seeded)
Team	Rank
France	9
Portugal	10
Russia	12
Greece	16

Pot 2 (unseeded)
Team	Rank
Ukraine	22
Republic of Ireland	34
Bosnia and Herzegovina	42
Slovenia	49

== Matches ==
Team 1	Agg.	Team 2	1st leg	2nd leg
Republic of Ireland	1–2	France	0–1	1–1 (a.e.t.)
Portugal	2–0	Bosnia and Herzegovina	1–0	1–0
Greece	1–0	Ukraine	0–0	1–0
Russia	2–2 (a)	Slovenia	2–1	0–1

14 November 2009
20:00 UTC±0

Republic of Ireland	0–1	France
	Report	Anelka 72'

Croke Park, Dublin
Attendance: 74,103
Referee: Felix Brych (Germany)
18 November 2009
21:00 UTC+1

France	1–1 (a.e.t.)	Republic of Ireland
Gallas 103'	Report	Keane 32'

Stade de France, Saint-Denis
Attendance: 79,145
Referee: Martin Hansson (Sweden)

France won 2–1 on aggregate.
Ireland officially asked FIFA for the second leg to be replayed after Thierry Henry clearly handled the ball twice during the build-up to the French goal. This request was denied. Ireland eventually pursued legal action against FIFA over the decision before ultimately receiving a €5 million settlement.

14 November 2009
20:30 UTC±0

Portugal	1–0	Bosnia and Herzegovina
Alves 31'	Report

Estádio da Luz, Lisbon
Attendance: 60,588
Referee: Martin Atkinson (England)
18 November 2009
20:45 UTC+1

Bosnia and Herzegovina	0–1	Portugal
	Report	Meireles 56'

Bilino Polje Stadium, Zenica
Attendance: 15,000
Referee: Roberto Rosetti (Italy)

Portugal won 2–0 on aggregate.

14 November 2009
20:00 UTC+2

Greece	0–0	Ukraine
	Report

Olympic Stadium, Athens
Attendance: 39,045
Referee: Laurent Duhamel (France)
18 November 2009
20:00 UTC+2

Ukraine	0–1	Greece
	Report	Salpingidis 31'

Donbas Arena, Donetsk
Attendance: 31,643
Referee: Olegário Benquerença (Portugal)

Greece won 1–0 on aggregate.

14 November 2009
19:00 UTC+3

Russia	2–1	Slovenia
Bilyaletdinov 40', 52'	Report	Pečnik 88'

Luzhniki Stadium, Moscow
Attendance: 71,600
Referee: Claus Bo Larsen (Denmark)
18 November 2009
20:45 UTC+1

Slovenia	1–0	Russia
Dedić 44'	Report

Ljudski vrt, Maribor
Attendance: 12,510
Referee: Terje Hauge (Norway)

2–2 on aggregate; Slovenia won on away goals.
After the game, Russian fans followed the Republic of Ireland's lead. They demanded a replay of their World Cup qualification play-off against Slovenia on the official site of FIFA. However, there was not any reaction from FIFA on this event.

== Goalscorers ==
There were 10 goals scored in 8 matches, for an average of 1.25 goals per match.

2 goals

- (Russia) Diniyar Bilyaletdinov

1 goal

- (France) Nicolas Anelka
- (France) William Gallas
- (Greece) Dimitris Salpingidis
- (Republic of Ireland) Robbie Keane
- (Portugal) Bruno Alves
- (Portugal) Raul Meireles
- (Slovenia) Zlatko Dedić
- (Slovenia) Nejc Pečnik
