= Uefa 2010 =

Uefa 2010 may refer to

- 2010 FIFA World Cup qualification (UEFA)
- 2009–10 UEFA Champions League
- 2010–11 UEFA Champions League
- 2009–10 UEFA Europa League
- 2010–11 UEFA Europa League
