= Bastian Schweinsteiger =

German footballer (born 1984)

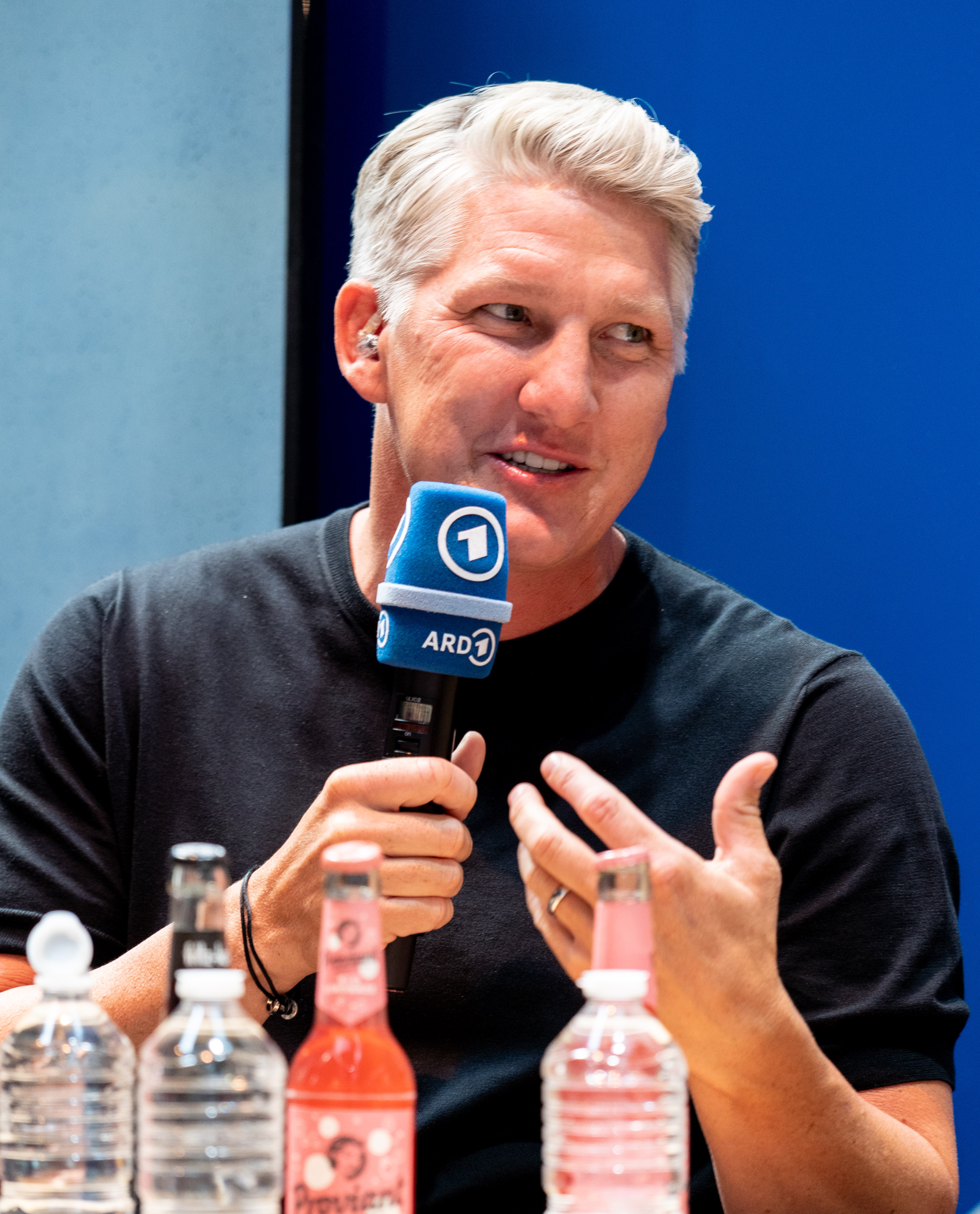
- Schweinsteiger in 2023

Personal information
- Full name: Bastian Schweinsteiger
- Date of birth: 1 August 1984 (age 42)
- Place of birth: Kolbermoor, West Germany
- Height: 1.83 m (6 ft 0 in)
- Position: Midfielder

Youth career
- 1990–1992: FV Oberaudorf
- 1992–1998: TSV 1860 Rosenheim
- 1998–2002: Bayern Munich

Senior career*
Years	Team	Apps	(Gls)
2001–2005	Bayern Munich II	34	(2)
2002–2015	Bayern Munich	342	(45)
2015–2017	Manchester United	18	(1)
2017–2019	Chicago Fire	85	(8)
Total		479	(56)

International career
2000	Germany U16	1	(0)
2001–2002	Germany U18	11	(2)
2002–2003	Germany U19	7	(2)
2004	Germany U21	7	(2)
2004–2016	Germany	121	(24)
Medal record
Men's football
Representing Germany
FIFA World Cup
Winner	2014 Brazil	Team
Bronze medal – third place	2010 South Africa	Team
Bronze medal – third place	2006 Germany	Team
UEFA European Championship
Runner-up	2008 Austria–Switzerland	Team
Bronze medal – third place	2012 Poland–Ukraine	Team
FIFA Confederations Cup
Bronze medal – third place	2005 Germany	Team
- * Club domestic league appearances and goals

Bastian Schweinsteiger (/ˈʃwaɪnʃtaɪɡər/ SHWYNE-shty-gər, German: [ˈbasti̯a(ː)n ˈʃvaɪnʃtaɪɡɐ]; born 1 August 1984) is a German former professional footballer who played as a midfielder. Earlier in his career, he primarily played as a wide midfielder before later switching to a central midfield role. Former Germany national team manager Joachim Löw has referred to Schweinsteiger as one of the greatest players the country has ever produced.

Schweinsteiger spent 17 seasons at Bayern Munich, playing in exactly 500 matches across all competitions and scoring 68 goals. His honours at the club include eight Bundesliga titles, seven DFB-Pokal titles, a UEFA Champions League title, a FIFA Club World Cup title and a UEFA Super Cup title. He joined Manchester United in 2015, playing sparingly for 18 months before moving to Chicago Fire. He announced his retirement from playing in October 2019.

Schweinsteiger played for the German national team from 2004 to 2016. He is Germany's fourth-most-capped player of all time, having earned 121 caps and scored 24 goals. He was selected in their squads for four European Championships and three World Cups, including their victory at the 2014 FIFA World Cup, when he was widely regarded as one of the most important contributors in Germany's campaign, playing an especially important role in defending Lionel Messi in the final. Following Philipp Lahm's international retirement on 2 September 2014, Schweinsteiger was named captain of the national team. He played his last match for Germany against Finland on 31 August 2016, after which he retired from international football.

Since his retirement as a player in 2019, Schweinsteiger has worked as an on-air football analyst for German television broadcaster ARD and its weekend programme Sportschau.

== Club career ==
=== Bayern Munich ===
Schweinsteiger signed with FC Bayern Munich as a youth team player on 1 July 1998 and rose through the club's youth sides. A talented youth ski racer, he had to decide between pursuing a professional career in skiing or one in football. Having won the German youth championship in July 2002, Schweinsteiger quickly earned a place in the reserves, producing a string of solid third-division displays. He initially earned a reputation for being a rebel off the pitch, making headlines for the wrong reasons but has since settled down.

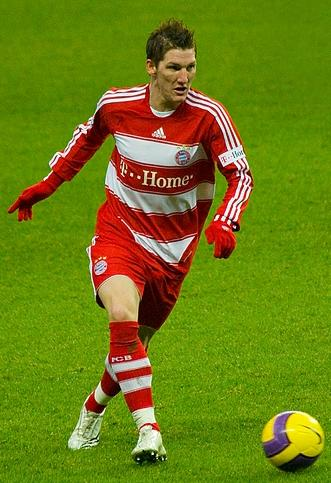
Schweinsteiger playing for Bayern Munich in 2007

During his first appearances in the titular eleven, he played left-back. After just two training sessions with the first team, coach Ottmar Hitzfeld gave Schweinsteiger his debut, at the age of 18, as a late substitute in a UEFA Champions League game against RC Lens in November 2002, and the youngster made an immediate impact, creating a goal for Markus Feulner within minutes. He signed a professional contract the following month and went on to appear in 14 Bundesliga games in 2002–03, helping Bayern to a league and cup double. The next season, he played 26 Bundesliga games. He scored his first Bayern goal against VfL Wolfsburg in September 2003.

Surprisingly sent back to Bayern's reserve team by new coach Felix Magath at the beginning of the 2004–05 season, Schweinsteiger swiftly returned to play a role in the double-winning campaign and scored his inaugural Champions League goal in Bayern's quarter-final first leg defeat at Chelsea. Over the next three seasons, up until the end of 2007–08, Schweinsteiger made 135 appearances in all competitions for Bayern Munich (Champions League, Bundesliga and DFB-Pokal), scoring 10 goals in the process.

On 15 August 2008, Schweinsteiger scored the first Bundesliga goal of the 2008–09 season. In December that year, he extended his contract until 2012. Two years later, in December 2010, he extended his contract with Bayern until 2016, with the announcement came at the Allianz Arena following a 3–0 victory over St. Pauli.

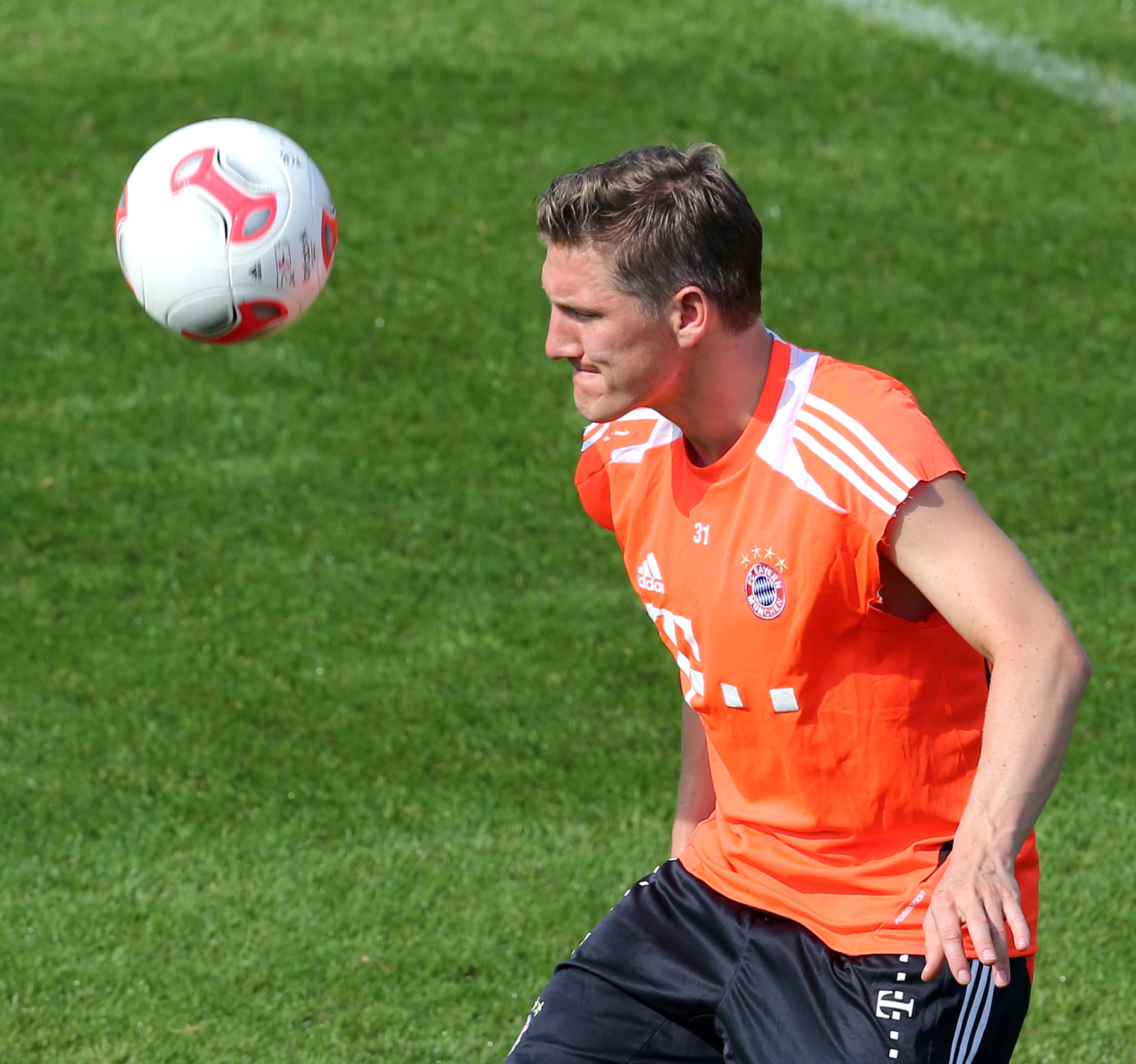
Schweinsteiger training with Bayern Munich in 2013

On 25 April 2012, Schweinsteiger scored from the last and match-clinching penalty kick against Real Madrid to send Bayern through to the 2012 UEFA Champions League Final, where they would face Chelsea. The match, played at Bayern's Allianz Arena, ended 1–1 and went to a penalty shoot-out. With the shoot-out poised at 3–3, Petr Čech tipped Schweinsteiger's shot onto the post, allowing Didier Drogba to seal the title for Chelsea with the next kick.

In the 2012–13 season, Schweinsteiger performed considerably well, continuing his duties as central midfielder along with new signing Javi Martínez. On 6 April 2013, Schweinsteiger scored a backheel flick goal against Eintracht Frankfurt which sealed the Bundesliga title for Bayern. The season ended on a high for Schweinsteiger, as Bayern secured a treble of Bundesliga, DFB-Pokal and Champions League.

Schweinsteiger received the 2013 German player of the year due to his performance for Bayern Munich. He was described by then manager Jupp Heynckes as the best midfielder in the world and Heynckes wanted either Schweinsteiger, Frank Ribéry or Thomas Müller to win the Ballon d'Or.

He scored an equaliser goal in the match against Manchester United in the first leg of their 2013–14 UEFA Champions League quarter-final at Old Trafford but saw a red card later in that match.

He made his 2014–15 season debut in a 4–0 win against 1899 Hoffenheim. He came in for Mario Götze in the 78th minute. On 16 May 2015, with Bayern having already won the league, he scored the opening goal in a 2–1 defeat at SC Freiburg. On 23 May 2015, Schweinsteiger scored on his 500th appearance for Bayern in a 2–0 win over Mainz. This proved to be his last match with the club. He transferred to Manchester United on 13 July 2015, having been at Bayern for 17 years.

=== Manchester United ===
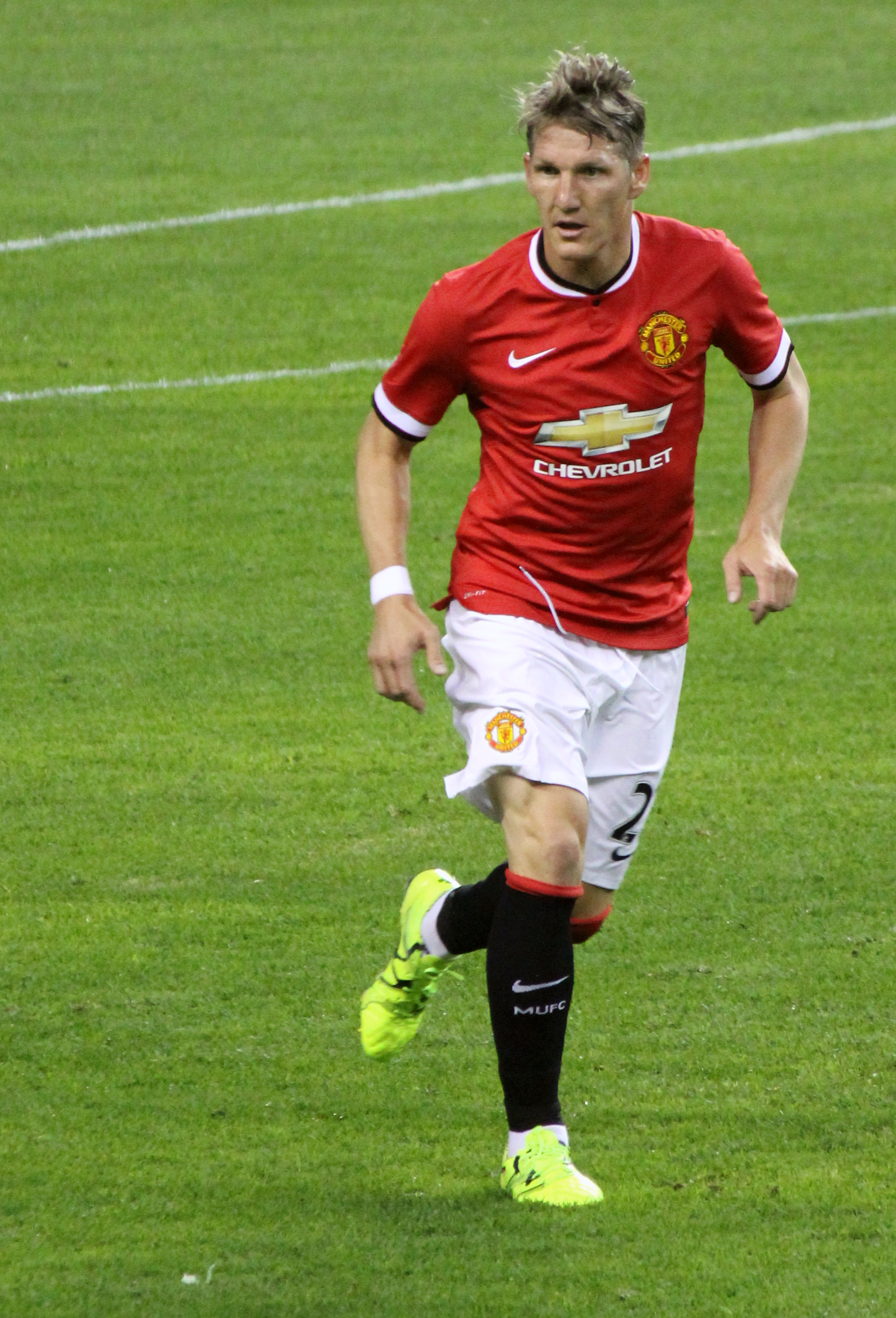
Schweinsteiger playing for Manchester United in 2015

On 13 July 2015, Manchester United completed the signing of Schweinsteiger on a three-year contract for a fee of €9 million (£6.5 million), reuniting him with his former Bayern coach Louis van Gaal. Manchester United had never before fielded a German in the first team; Markus Neumayr and Ron-Robert Zieler were at the club before him, but neither made it into the first team. Schweinsteiger was given shirt number 23 in pre-season, but switched to 31, which he wore at Bayern, before the official start to the season.

Schweinsteiger made his pre-season debut for Manchester United in a friendly match against Club América on 17 July 2015. United defeated the Mexican club 1–0 in Seattle. His Premier League debut came on 8 August, as a 60th-minute substitute for Michael Carrick as the season began with a 1–0 home victory over Tottenham Hotspur, being booked eight minutes into his first appearance for a foul on Nacer Chadli. On 28 November he scored his first goal for the club, equalising with a header in a 1–1 draw against Leicester City.

On 7 December 2015, Schweinsteiger was punished with a three-match retrospective ban by The Football Association for striking West Ham United's Winston Reid in the throat in their meeting two days earlier. In January 2016, he sustained a knee injury which sidelined him for two months, followed by medial knee ligament damage in mid-March which kept him off the field for the remainder of the season.

After the arrival of new manager, José Mourinho, Schweinsteiger was demoted and sent to training with the under-23 team. A number of high-profile former teammates have criticised Mourinho's handling of the matter, accusing Mourinho of showing a lack of respect for Schweinsteiger. He returned to first team training towards the end of 2016, and made his first appearance since March when he came on as a late substitute in the EFL Cup quarter-final against West Ham United on 30 November 2016. He made his first start in over a year in a 4–0 win in the FA Cup fourth round home tie against Wigan Athletic on 29 January 2017, in which he scored his first Old Trafford goal for Manchester United with an overhead finish. For his goal, as well as his assist to Marouane Fellaini for the opening goal, he was voted "Man of the Match" by the fans. On 3 February, he was added to Manchester United's squad for the Europa League knockout phase. Later that month, on 22 February, he made his debut in the competition as a substitute in a 1–0 away win over Saint-Étienne in the Round of 32 second leg. He ultimately received a winner's medal after his club won the title at the end of the season.

=== Chicago Fire ===
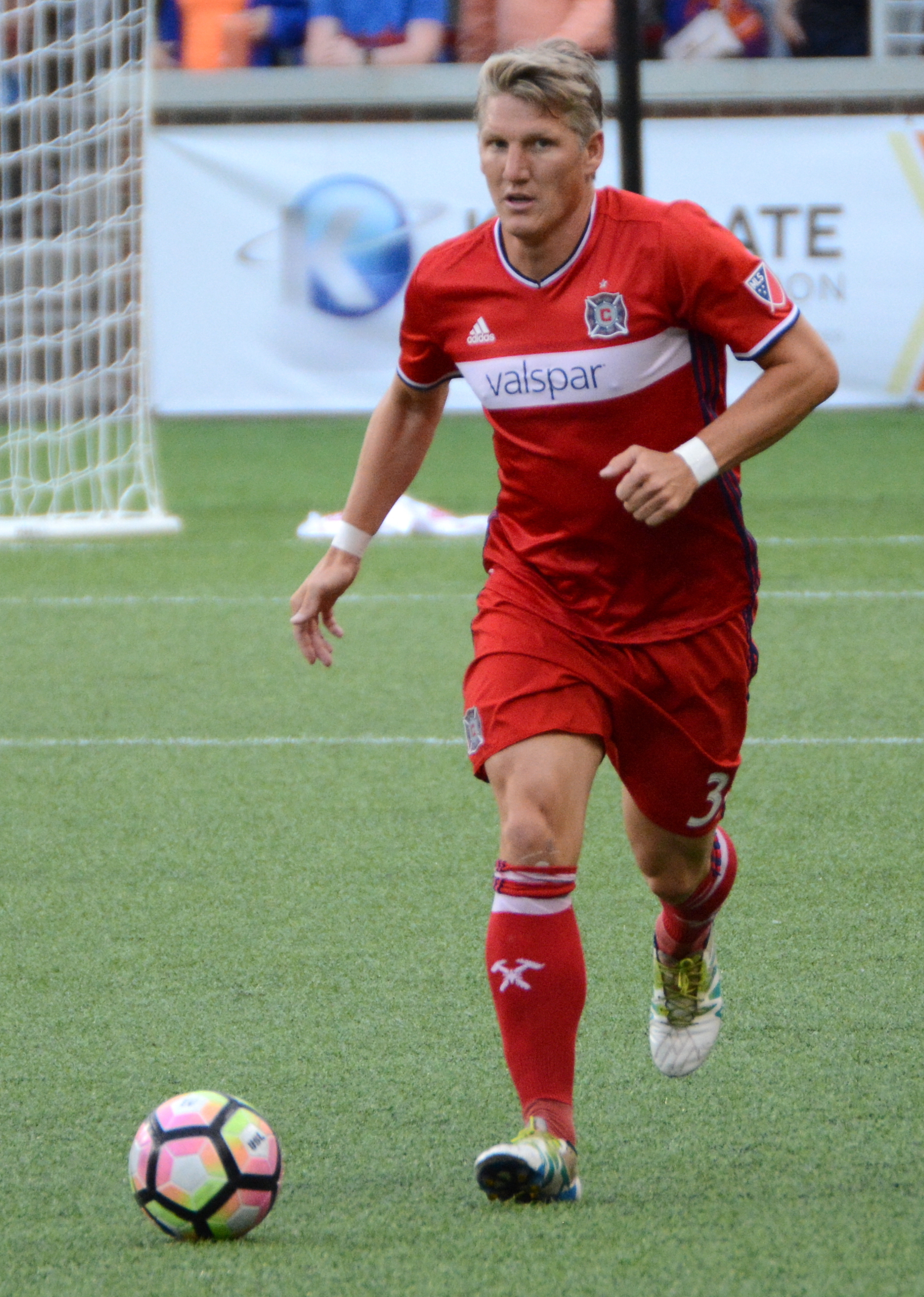
Schweinsteiger playing for Chicago Fire in 2017

On 21 March 2017, Manchester United allowed Schweinsteiger to join Major League Soccer side Chicago Fire, subject to a medical and a visa being secured. The move was completed on 29 March. A few days later, Mourinho stated that he "regretted" the way he had treated Schweinsteiger. On 1 April, Schweinsteiger debuted for Chicago Fire, scoring in a 2–2 home draw against Montreal Impact. By mid-season, he would help guide Chicago to the top of the MLS standings and be voted into the "MLS All-Star Fan XI" (along with teammate Nemanja Nikolić) to face Real Madrid at the 2017 MLS All-Star Game in Chicago. After guiding the Fire back into the playoffs after a five-year drought, Schweinsteiger was awarded the contract option of another year in 2018. Schweinsteiger netted a goal and also provided an assist to Alan Gordon's equalising goal in the stoppage time in a 2–2 draw against Toronto FC on 29 April 2018. On 5 August, he scored a long-range goal to level the scoreline after coming on as a substitute in the second half, but his side were defeated in a 2–1 away loss against Real Salt Lake. On 11 July, Schweinsteiger scored a goal in the stoppage time and provided one assist to Aleksandar Katai's goal in a 4–3 home defeat against Philadelphia Union.

On 28 August 2018, Schweinsteiger took part at a farewell match organized by his former club Bayern Munich, in which he played the first half for Chicago Fire and the second half for his former club. The match ended 4–0 for Bayern with Schweinsteiger scoring the last goal.

=== Retirement ===
On 8 October 2019, Schweinsteiger announced his retirement from professional football. A few days after his retirement from active sports in October 2019, the ARD announced that Schweinsteiger would be accompanying live broadcasts of football matches as an expert in Qatar for the next three years up to and including the 2022 FIFA World Cup.

== International career ==
On 6 June 2004, Schweinsteiger debuted for the German senior squad in a friendly match against Hungary. He was part of the Germany squad for every major tournament from UEFA Euro 2004 until Euro 2016.

=== Euro 2004 ===
Right after taking part in the under-21s' disappointing run at the 2004 European Championships, he was called up for Euro 2004. He set up the opening goal for Bayern teammate Michael Ballack in Germany's 2–1 loss against the Czech Republic.

=== 2005 FIFA Confederations Cup and 2006 FIFA World Cup ===
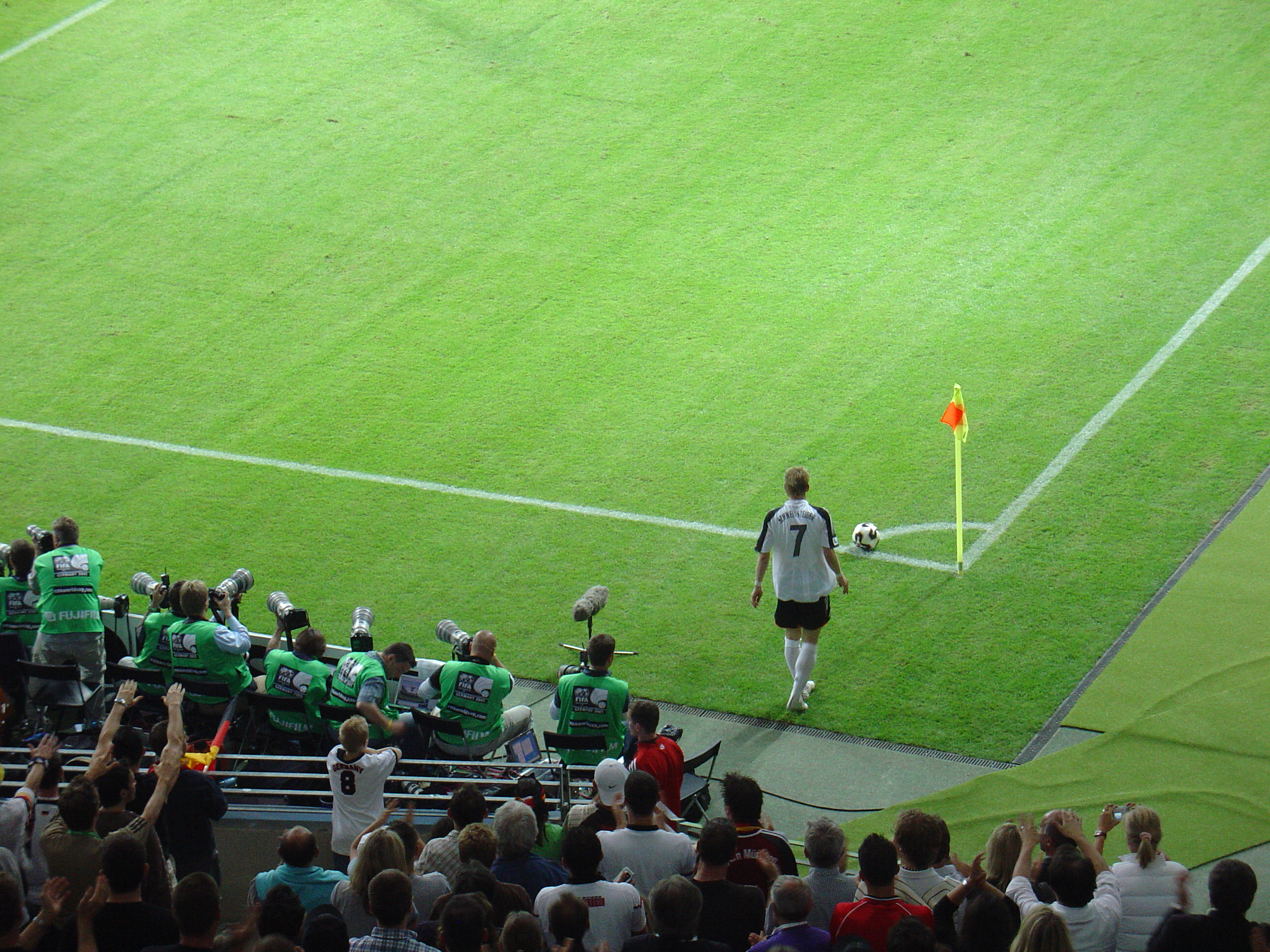
Schweinsteiger preparing to take a corner kick for Germany during the 2005 FIFA Confederations Cup

He scored his first two international goals on 8 June 2005 against Russia and scored his first goal in a competitive match against Tunisia on 18 June 2005 at the Confederations Cup in Germany. He was called up to the 2006 FIFA World Cup on home soil and shot into prominence at the tournament with his two brilliant long-range strikes in the third-place match against Portugal, which won him the Man of the Match award. The match ended 3–1 with the 21-year-old nearly claiming a hat-trick but his deflected free kick was credited as an own goal to Armando Petit.

=== Euro 2008 ===
During Euro 2008 qualifiers, Schweinsteiger scored two goals en route to a record 13–0 win over San Marino in San Marino. He scored the third goal in Germany's 4–1 win over Slovakia in Bratislava.

Schweinsteiger lost his place in the starting 11 when Germany manager Joachim Löw moved striker Lukas Podolski to Schweinsteiger's usual position on the left wing to accommodate the strike partnership of Miroslav Klose and Mario Gómez, and he made two substitute appearances in the group stage. In the second match against Croatia, he was shown a straight red card for reacting to a challenge from Jerko Leko as Germany succumbed to a shock 2–1 defeat. After serving his suspension by missing the game against Austria, he returned to the starting line-up in the quarterfinal against Portugal, as Löw reverted to the old 4–4–2 formation when Gómez was benched after failing to make an impression. Once again he was instrumental in Germany's 3–2 win, scoring one goal and setting up the other two. He also scored his country's first goal in the 3–2 semifinal victory against Turkey. He captained the team for the first time in a friendly against the United Arab Emirates.

=== 2010 FIFA World Cup ===
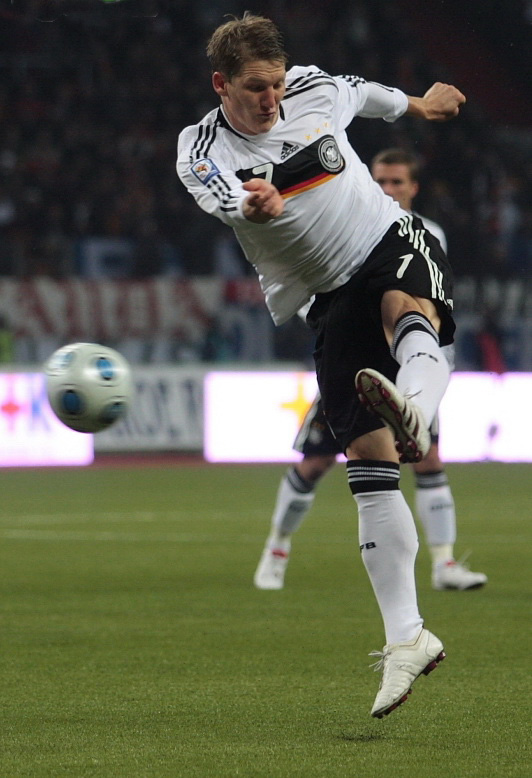
Schweinsteiger striking the ball for Germany during a 2010 FIFA World Cup qualifier against Russia in 2009

Schweinsteiger featured often in 2010 World Cup qualifying, playing nine of the 10 games and contributing three goals. He started in Germany's third pre-warm-up game vs. Bosnia on 3 June 2010, and scored two penalties in a 3–1 victory in the space of four minutes, but in the 87th minute he was substituted off for Bayern Munich teammate Toni Kroos.

During the 2010 FIFA World Cup, Schweinsteiger was charged with replacing the injured Michael Ballack at the centre of midfield. He performed admirably in this role, adding valuable leadership and international experience to a very young German side. He was vital to both the German attack and defence, as was apparent when he was named the Man of the Match after the quarter-final match against Argentina, where he provided two assists while also managing to contain Lionel Messi. Germany subsequently lost to Spain in the semi-finals. Germany was able to rally for a 3–2 victory over Uruguay in the third-place match, and, with Philipp Lahm resting on the bench because of illness, Schweinsteiger served as captain.

Overall, Schweinsteiger recorded three assists in seven matches in South Africa, which tied him for the most assists in the finals with Dirk Kuyt, Kaká, Thomas Müller and Mesut Özil. In recognition of his excellent play throughout the tournament, he was chosen as one of 10 finalists for the prestigious Golden Ball, awarded to the most outstanding player of the tournament.

=== Euro 2012 ===
Schweinsteiger established himself as first choice as defensive midfielder in Germany's qualifying group. He played five matches – once against each opponent: Belgium, Azerbaijan, Kazakhstan, Austria and Turkey – and helped Germany win 10 out of 10 games, scoring once and providing one assist.

Schweinsteiger started all five of Germany's matches at the UEFA Euro 2012 finals and assisted both of Mario Gómez goals in the 2–1 Group B win over rivals the Netherlands.

=== 2014 FIFA World Cup ===
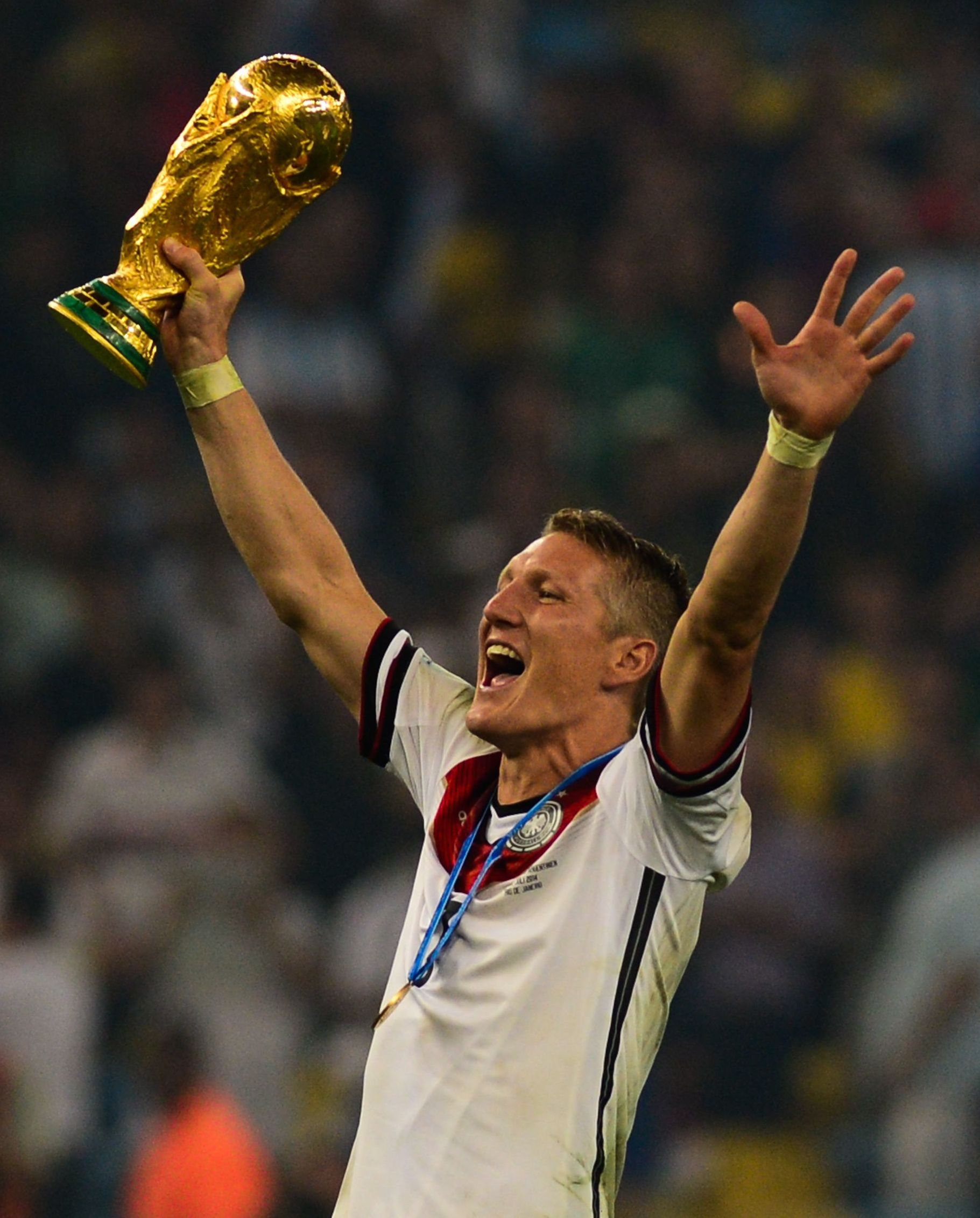
Schweinsteiger celebrating with the World Cup trophy after winning the 2014 FIFA World Cup final

Schweinsteiger made five appearances as Germany qualified for the 2014 FIFA World Cup. On 15 October 2013, he won his 100th cap for the national team in a 5–3 win over Sweden.

After making a substitute appearance in the team's second match against Ghana, Schweinsteiger was selected to start in the third group game against the United States. He retained his place in the team for Germany's round of 16 match, a 2–1 win against Algeria. He was instrumental in the World Cup finals against Argentina and led the mid-field with sweeping passes for the German attack. Germany won the World Cup final 1–0 through Mario Götze's 113th-minute goal.

=== Euro 2016 and retirement ===
Prior to the start of qualification, Schweinsteiger was appointed as the new captain for Germany after Philipp Lahm's retirement. On 23 March 2016 he sustained damage on his knee while he was training with the national team which made him miss the rest of the Premier League season but he recovered just in time to be selected for Germany's 27-man provisional squad for UEFA Euro 2016. On 31 May, Schweinsteiger was selected for Germany's final 23-man squad for UEFA Euro 2016. During this time, Schweinsteiger also took part in a collaboration between the German Football Association and The LEGO Group, who in 2016 released a Europe-exclusive collectible minifigure series, with Schweinsteiger featured as the seventh of sixteen minifigures in the collection.

On 12 June 2016, Schweinsteiger scored in stoppage time after coming on late in a 2–0 group stage victory over Ukraine. Nine days later, Schweinsteiger set a new record for German player with the most appearances in a European Championship match. After the tournament, Schweinsteiger announced his retirement from competitive international football, having played in 120 games, scoring 24 goals. One month later, he participated in his last ever international appearance for Germany, against Finland in a friendly match. He was succeeded as captain by Manuel Neuer.

== Style of play ==
Schweinsteiger largely operated in the centre, but he was versatile enough to provide an option on the wing, either on the left or right flank. During his years with Bayern Munich, he was regarded as one of the best midfielders in the world, and he has been described by former Germany national team manager Joachim Löw as one of the country's greatest players ever. Schweinsteiger possessed a fearsome shot from range, as well as excellent crossing and a wicked delivery from set-pieces, while his boundless energy also served him well. Described as a "two-way player" by Nick Amies, he was also used in a variety of other roles, including as a holding midfielder, as an attacking midfielder, in a box-to-box role, as a playmaker, and in a deep-lying midfield role. A powerful, physical, and elegant player, who also possessed good technique, skill, passing ability, vision, and creativity, Schweinsteiger was known for his ability to control and dictate the flow of his team's play in midfield, build attacks, and create chances for his teammates with his distribution. Dubbed the "Midfield Motor", Schweinsteiger was also a superb reader of the game and scored spectacularly due to his good positioning. He was called "the brain" of the German national team by coach Joachim Löw, and was also described as a "midfield mastermind".

Beyond his offensive and creative capabilities, he was also known for his defensive skills, work-rate, and tackling ability. For his performances, he was voted as the best German player of the year in 2013. Jonathan Wilson, when writing for The Guardian during the same year, labelled Schweinsteiger as a type holding midfielder that he described as a "carrier" or "surger", namely "a player capable of making late runs or carrying the ball at his feet." During his time with Chicago, Schweinsteiger was also occasionally deployed as a central defender or sweeper in a three-man back-line, in addition to his usual role in midfield, courtesy of his vision and defensive skills; in this deeper role, he was not only given defensive responsibilities, such as marking opposing players, but was also given offensive duties, and was tasked with playing the ball out from the back, retaining possession, advancing into midfield, and controlling the play. Because of Schweinsteiger's wide range of skills, his former Chicago Fire manager, Veljko Paunović, described him upon his retirement in 2019 as "unique and special", also commenting: "He's a complete player, a total player. In Germany, where they know him even better than us, they call him a 'Fussballgott' [a "football god," in German] because he represents everything."

== Personal life ==
Schweinsteiger is a Roman Catholic. He is known to fans as "Schweini" or "Basti", the latter to distinguish him from his elder brother, Tobias, a professional footballer who also played for Bayern Munich, albeit in the reserve team. Schweinsteiger was in a relationship with model Sarah Brandner from 2007 until July 2014. They lived in Munich together.

In September 2014, he began a relationship with Serbian tennis player Ana Ivanovic. The couple married on 12 July 2016 in Venice, Italy. They have two sons, born in 2018 and 2019. In February 2023, the couple announced that they were expecting their third child together. The couple split up in 2025.

Schweinsteiger was a talented ski racer and is childhood friends with Felix Neureuther.

In June 2026, when Schweinsteiger was asked on ARD what the Germany team could expect from their opponents ahead of their 2026 FIFA World Cup group match against Ivory Coast, his comments about African football being "unpredictable," "a bit unorthodox, "a bit wild," and "not so conditioned by tactics" were criticised by several pundits in the media, as well as Ivory Coast manager Emerse Faé, for playing into racist stereotypes. He later issued a statement, stating: "I was talking about football, not about people. It's a football analysis. Nothing more and nothing less. [...] I certainly didn't mean to offend anyone."

== Career statistics ==
=== Club ===
Appearances and goals by club, season and competition
Club	Season	League			National cup (Note: Includes DFB-Pokal, FA Cup, U.S. Open Cup)		League cup (Note: Includes DFL-Ligapokal, Football League/EFL Cup)		Continental		Other		Total	
Club	Season	Division	Apps	Goals	Apps	Goals	Apps	Goals	Apps	Goals	Apps	Goals	Apps	Goals
Bayern Munich II	2001–02	Regionalliga Süd	4	0	—		—		—		—		4	0
Bayern Munich II	2002–03	Regionalliga Süd	23	2	1	0	—		—		—		24	2
Bayern Munich II	2003–04	Regionalliga Süd	4	0	—		—		—		—		4	0
Bayern Munich II	2004–05	Regionalliga Süd	3	0	1	0	—		—		—		4	0
Bayern Munich II	Total		34	2	2	0	—		—		—		36	2
Bayern Munich	2002–03	Bundesliga	14	0	1	2	0	0	1 (Note: Appearance(s) in UEFA Champions League)	0	—		16	2
Bayern Munich	2003–04	Bundesliga	26	4	3	0	1	0	3	0	—		33	4
Bayern Munich	2004–05	Bundesliga	26	3	5	0	0	0	7	1	—		38	4
Bayern Munich	2005–06	Bundesliga	30	3	4	0	1	0	7	0	—		42	3
Bayern Munich	2006–07	Bundesliga	27	4	3	0	2	0	8	2	—		40	6
Bayern Munich	2007–08	Bundesliga	30	1	4	0	2	1	12 (Note: Appearances in UEFA Cup)	0	—		48	2
Bayern Munich	2008–09	Bundesliga	31	5	4	2	—		9	2	—		44	9
Bayern Munich	2009–10	Bundesliga	33	2	4	1	—		12	0	—		49	3
Bayern Munich	2010–11	Bundesliga	32	4	5	2	—		7	2	1 (Note: Appearance in DFL-Supercup)	0	45	8
Bayern Munich	2011–12	Bundesliga	22	3	3	1	—		11	1	—		36	5
Bayern Munich	2012–13	Bundesliga	28	7	5	0	—		12	2	—		45	9
Bayern Munich	2013–14	Bundesliga	23	4	4	1	—		8	3	1	0	36	8
Bayern Munich	2014–15	Bundesliga	20	5	2	0	—		6	0	0	0	28	5
Bayern Munich	Total		342	45	47	9	6	1	103	13	2	0	500	68
Manchester United	2015–16	Premier League	18	1	2	0	1	0	10 (Note: Eight appearances in UEFA Champions League, two appearances in UEFA Europa League)	0	—		31	1
Manchester United	2016–17	Premier League	0	0	2	1	1	0	1 (Note: Appearance in UEFA Europa League)	0	0	0	4	1
Manchester United	Total		18	1	4	1	2	0	11	0	—		35	2
Chicago Fire	2017	MLS	24	3	1	0	—		—		1 (Note: Appearance in MLS Cup Playoffs)	0	26	3
Chicago Fire	2018	MLS	31	4	4	0	—		—		—		35	4
Chicago Fire	2019	MLS	30	1	0	0	—		—		1 (Note: Appearance in Leagues Cup)	0	31	1
Chicago Fire	Total		85	8	5	0	—		—		2	0	92	8
Career total			479	56	58	10	8	1	114	13	4	0	663	80

=== International ===
Appearances and goals by national team and year
National team	Year	Apps	Goals
Germany	2004	10	0
Germany	2005	13	4
Germany	2006	18	9
Germany	2007	6	0
Germany	2008	15	4
Germany	2009	10	2
Germany	2010	12	2
Germany	2011	6	2
Germany	2012	7	0
Germany	2013	3	0
Germany	2014	8	0
Germany	2015	6	0
Germany	2016	7	1
Total		121	24

Scores and results list Germany's goal tally first, score column indicates score after each Schweinsteiger goal.

List of international goals scored by Bastian Schweinsteiger
No.	Date	Venue	Cap	Opponent	Score	Result	Competition
1	8 June 2005	Borussia-Park, Mönchengladbach, Germany	14	Russia	1–1	2–2	Friendly
2	8 June 2005	Borussia-Park, Mönchengladbach, Germany	14	Russia	2–1	2–2	Friendly
3	18 June 2005	Rhein-Energie Stadion, Cologne, Germany	16	Tunisia	2–0	3–0	2005 FIFA Confederations Cup
4	29 June 2005	Zentralstadion, Leipzig, Germany	18	Mexico	2–1	4–3	2005 FIFA Confederations Cup
5	22 March 2006	Westfalenstadion, Dortmund, Germany	25	United States	1–0	4–1	Friendly
6	30 May 2006	BayArena, Leverkusen, Germany	27	Japan	2–2	2–2	Friendly
7	2 June 2006	Borussia-Park, Mönchengladbach, Germany	28	Colombia	2–0	3–0	Friendly
8	8 July 2006	Gottlieb-Daimler-Stadion, Stuttgart, Germany	35	Portugal	1–0	3–1	2006 FIFA World Cup
9	8 July 2006	Gottlieb-Daimler-Stadion, Stuttgart, Germany	35	Portugal	3–0	3–1	2006 FIFA World Cup
10	6 September 2006	Stadio Olimpico, Serravalle, San Marino	38	San Marino	2–0	13–0	UEFA Euro 2008 qualifying
11	6 September 2006	Stadio Olimpico, Serravalle, San Marino	38	San Marino	7–0	13–0	UEFA Euro 2008 qualifying
12	7 October 2006	Ostseestadion, Rostock, Germany	39	Georgia	1–0	2–0	Friendly
13	11 October 2006	Tehelné pole, Bratislava, Slovakia	40	Slovakia	3–0	4–1	UEFA Euro 2008 qualifying
14	19 June 2008	St. Jakob-Park, Basel, Switzerland	54	Portugal	1–0	3–2	UEFA Euro 2008
15	25 June 2008	St. Jakob-Park, Basel, Switzerland	55	Turkey	1–1	3–2	UEFA Euro 2008
16	20 August 2008	Frankenstadion, Nuremberg, Germany	57	Belgium	1–0	2–0	Friendly
17	6 September 2008	Rheinpark Stadion, Vaduz, Liechtenstein	58	Liechtenstein	4–0	6–0	2010 FIFA World Cup qualification
18	28 March 2009	Zentralstadion, Leipzig, Germany	64	Liechtenstein	3–0	4–0	2010 FIFA World Cup qualification
19	12 August 2009	Tofik Bakhramov Stadium, Baku, Azerbaijan	68	Azerbaijan	1–0	2–0	2010 FIFA World Cup qualification
20	3 June 2010	Commerzbank-Arena, Frankfurt, Germany	74	Bosnia and Herzegovina	2–1	3–1	Friendly
21	3 June 2010	Commerzbank-Arena, Frankfurt, Germany	74	Bosnia and Herzegovina	3–1	3–1	Friendly
22	10 August 2011	Mercedes-Benz Arena, Stuttgart, Germany	88	Brazil	1–0	3–2	Friendly
23	7 October 2011	Türk Telekom Arena, Istanbul, Turkey	90	Turkey	3–1	3–1	UEFA Euro 2012 qualifying
24	12 June 2016	Stade Pierre-Mauroy, Villeneuve-d'Ascq, France	116	Ukraine	2–0	2–0	UEFA Euro 2016

== Honours ==
Bayern Munich Juniors

- Under 17 Bundesliga: 2001
- Under 19 Bundesliga: 2002

Bayern Munich II

- Regionalliga Süd: 2003–04

Bayern Munich

- Bundesliga: 2002–03, 2004–05, 2005–06, 2007–08, 2009–10, 2012–13, 2013–14, 2014–15
- DFB-Pokal: 2002–03, 2004–05, 2005–06, 2007–08, 2009–10, 2012–13, 2013–14
- DFL-Ligapokal: 2007
- DFL-Supercup: 2010
- UEFA Champions League: 2012–13; runner-up: 2009–10, 2011–12

Manchester United

- FA Cup: 2015–16
- UEFA Europa League: 2016–17

Germany

- FIFA World Cup: 2014; third place: 2006, 2010
- UEFA European Championship: runner-up: 2008; third place: 2012
- FIFA Confederations Cup third place: 2005

Individual

- Silbernes Lorbeerblatt: 2006, 2010, 2014
- FIFA World Cup Dream Team: 2010
- FIFA World Cup top assist provider: 2010 (3, shared with Thomas Müller, Mesut Özil, Kaká, and Dirk Kuyt)
- Germany national team Player of the Year: 2010
- ESM Team of the Year: 2012–13
- Footballer of the Year in Germany: 2013
- UEFA Best Player in Europe Award: 2013 (7th place)
- FIFA FIFPro World XI 3rd team: 2013
- FIFA FIFPro World XI 4th team: 2014
- Bambi Award: 2016
- MLS All-Star: 2017, 2019
- Bayern Munich Hall of Fame: 2018

Orders

- Silbernes Lorbeerblatt: 2010, 2014
- Bavarian Order of Merit: 2018
