= 2010 FIFA World Cup qualification (UEFA) =

Tournament details
- Dates: 20 August 2008 – 18 November 2009
- Teams: 53 (from 1 confederation)

Tournament statistics
- Matches played: 268
- Goals scored: 725 (2.71 per match)
- Attendance: 6,050,105 (22,575 per match)
- Top scorer(s): (Greece) Theofanis Gekas (10 goals)

The European zone of qualification for the 2010 FIFA World Cup saw 53 teams competing for 13 places at the finals in South Africa. The qualification process started on 20 August 2008, nearly two months after the end of UEFA Euro 2008, and ended on 18 November 2009. The qualification process saw the first competitive matches of Montenegro.

Denmark, England, Germany, Italy, Netherlands, Serbia, Slovakia, Spain, and Switzerland qualified in the first round by winning their groups. France, Greece, Portugal, and Slovenia qualified via the second round play-offs.

== Format ==
Teams were drawn into eight groups of six teams and one group of five teams. The nine group winners qualified directly, while the best eight second-placed teams contested home and away play off matches for the remaining four places. In determining the best eight second placed teams, the results against teams finishing last in the six team groups were not counted for consistency between the five and six team groups.

== Seeding ==
After initially proposing to use a similar system to recent World Cup and European Championship qualification (based on results across the previous two European qualification cycles), the UEFA Executive Committee decided on 27 September 2007 at its meeting in Istanbul that seeding for the qualifiers would be based on FIFA World Rankings, in accordance with the FIFA World Cup regulations (which note that where teams are ranked on "performance" criteria, the FIFA World Rankings must be used).

The November 2007 FIFA World Ranking the most recent at the time of the preliminary draw and used to determine the groups. Initially scheduled for 21 November, FIFA moved the release date of the ranking to 23 November to include the final match days of Euro 2008 qualification.

Pot A
Team	Rank
Italy	3
Spain	4
Germany	5
Czech Republic	6
France	7
Portugal	8
Netherlands	9
Croatia	10
Greece	11

Pot D
Team	Rank
Slovakia	50
Bosnia and Herzegovina	51
Hungary	52
Moldova	53
Wales	58
Macedonia	59
Belarus	60
Lithuania	61
Cyprus	65

Pot B
Team	Rank
England	12
Romania	13
Scotland	14
Turkey	16
Bulgaria	18
Russia	22
Poland	23
Sweden	24
Israel	26

Pot E
Team	Rank
Georgia	77
Albania	82
Slovenia	83
Latvia	88
Iceland	89
Armenia	90
Austria	91
Kazakhstan	110
Liechtenstein	122

Pot C
Team	Rank
Norway	28
Ukraine	29
Serbia	30
Denmark	31
Northern Ireland	32
Republic of Ireland	35
Finland	36
Switzerland	44
Belgium	49

Pot F
Team	Rank
Azerbaijan	125
Estonia	128
Malta	139
Luxembourg	152
Montenegro	172
Andorra	174
Faroe Islands	195
San Marino	197

=== Draw ===
The draw for the group stage took place in Durban, South Africa on 25 November 2007. During the draw, teams were drawn from the six pots A to F (see above) into the nine groups below, starting with pot F, which filled position 6 in the groups, then continued with pot E filling position 5, pot D in position 4 and so on.

== Summary ==
Table – top row: group winners, second row: group runners-up, third row: others. The winner of each group qualified for the 2010 FIFA World Cup together with the winners of the play-off. The play-offs took place between the eight best runners-up among all nine groups while the worst group runner-up did not qualify.

Group winners qualified directly for the 2010 FIFA World Cup
Eight best runners-up advanced to the second round (play-offs)
Worst runner-up and all other teams were eliminated after the first round

Group 1	Group 2	Group 3	Group 4	Group 5	Group 6	Group 7	Group 8	Group 9
Denmark	Switzerland	Slovakia	Germany	Spain	England	Serbia	Italy	Netherlands
Portugal	Greece	Slovenia	Russia	Bosnia and Herzegovina	Ukraine	France	Republic of Ireland	Norway
Sweden Hungary Albania Malta	Latvia Israel Luxembourg Moldova	Czech Republic Northern Ireland Poland San Marino	Finland Wales Azerbaijan Liechtenstein	Turkey Belgium Estonia Armenia	Croatia Belarus Kazakhstan Andorra	Austria Lithuania Romania Faroe Islands	Bulgaria Cyprus Montenegro Georgia	Scotland Macedonia Iceland

== First round ==
=== Group 1 ===
Pos	Team	Pld	W	D	L	GF	GA	GD	Pts	Qualification	(Denmark)	(Portugal)	(Sweden)	(Hungary)	(Albania)	(Malta)
1	Denmark	10	6	3	1	16	5	+11	21	Qualification to 2010 FIFA World Cup	—	1–1	1–0	0–1	3–0	3–0
2	Portugal	10	5	4	1	17	5	+12	19	Advance to second round	2–3	—	0–0	3–0	0–0	4–0
3	Sweden	10	5	3	2	13	5	+8	18		0–1	0–0	—	2–1	4–1	4–0
4	Hungary	10	5	1	4	10	8	+2	16		0–0	0–1	1–2	—	2–0	3–0
5	Albania	10	1	4	5	6	13	−7	7		1–1	1–2	0–0	0–1	—	3–0
6	Malta	10	0	1	9	0	26	−26	1		0–3	0–4	0–1	0–1	0–0	—

=== Group 2 ===
Pos	Team	Pld	W	D	L	GF	GA	GD	Pts	Qualification	(Switzerland)	(Greece)	(Latvia)	(Israel)	(Luxembourg)	(Moldova)
1	Switzerland	10	6	3	1	18	8	+10	21	Qualification to 2010 FIFA World Cup	—	2–0	2–1	0–0	1–2	2–0
2	Greece	10	6	2	2	20	10	+10	20	Advance to second round	1–2	—	5–2	2–1	2–1	3–0
3	Latvia	10	5	2	3	18	15	+3	17		2–2	0–2	—	1–1	2–0	3–2
4	Israel	10	4	4	2	20	10	+10	16		2–2	1–1	0–1	—	7–0	3–1
5	Luxembourg	10	1	2	7	4	25	−21	5		0–3	0–3	0–4	1–3	—	0–0
6	Moldova	10	0	3	7	6	18	−12	3		0–2	1–1	1–2	1–2	0–0	—

=== Group 3 ===
Pos	Team	Pld	W	D	L	GF	GA	GD	Pts	Qualification	(Slovakia)	(Slovenia)	(Czech Republic)	(Northern Ireland)	(Poland)	(San Marino)
1	Slovakia	10	7	1	2	22	10	+12	22	Qualification to 2010 FIFA World Cup	—	0–2	2–2	2–1	2–1	7–0
2	Slovenia	10	6	2	2	18	4	+14	20	Advance to second round	2–1	—	0–0	2–0	3–0	5–0
3	Czech Republic	10	4	4	2	17	6	+11	16		1–2	1–0	—	0–0	2–0	7–0
4	Northern Ireland	10	4	3	3	13	9	+4	15		0–2	1–0	0–0	—	3–2	4–0
5	Poland	10	3	2	5	19	14	+5	11		0–1	1–1	2–1	1–1	—	10–0
6	San Marino	10	0	0	10	1	47	−46	0		1–3	0–3	0–3	0–3	0–2	—

=== Group 4 ===
Pos	Team	Pld	W	D	L	GF	GA	GD	Pts	Qualification	(Germany)	(Russia)	(Finland)	(Wales)	(Azerbaijan)	(Liechtenstein)
1	Germany	10	8	2	0	26	5	+21	26	Qualification to 2010 FIFA World Cup	—	2–1	1–1	1–0	4–0	4–0
2	Russia	10	7	1	2	19	6	+13	22	Advance to second round	0–1	—	3–0	2–1	2–0	3–0
3	Finland	10	5	3	2	14	14	0	18		3–3	0–3	—	2–1	1–0	2–1
4	Wales	10	4	0	6	9	12	−3	12		0–2	1–3	0–2	—	1–0	2–0
5	Azerbaijan	10	1	2	7	4	14	−10	5		0–2	1–1	1–2	0–1	—	0–0
6	Liechtenstein	10	0	2	8	2	23	−21	2		0–6	0–1	1–1	0–2	0–2	—

=== Group 5 ===
Pos	Team	Pld	W	D	L	GF	GA	GD	Pts	Qualification	(Spain)	(Bosnia and Herzegovina)	(Turkey)	(Belgium)	(Estonia)	(Armenia)
1	Spain	10	10	0	0	28	5	+23	30	Qualification to 2010 FIFA World Cup	—	1–0	1–0	5–0	3–0	4–0
2	Bosnia and Herzegovina	10	6	1	3	25	13	+12	19	Advance to second round	2–5	—	1–1	2–1	7–0	4–1
3	Turkey	10	4	3	3	13	10	+3	15		1–2	2–1	—	1–1	4–2	2–0
4	Belgium	10	3	1	6	13	20	−7	10		1–2	2–4	2–0	—	3–2	2–0
5	Estonia	10	2	2	6	9	24	−15	8		0–3	0–2	0–0	2–0	—	1–0
6	Armenia	10	1	1	8	6	22	−16	4		1–2	0–2	0–2	2–1	2–2	—

=== Group 6 ===
Pos	Team	Pld	W	D	L	GF	GA	GD	Pts	Qualification	(England)	(Ukraine)	(Croatia)	(Belarus)	(Kazakhstan)	(Andorra)
1	England	10	9	0	1	34	6	+28	27	Qualification to 2010 FIFA World Cup	—	2–1	5–1	3–0	5–1	6–0
2	Ukraine	10	6	3	1	21	6	+15	21	Advance to second round	1–0	—	0–0	1–0	2–1	5–0
3	Croatia	10	6	2	2	19	13	+6	20		1–4	2–2	—	1–0	3–0	4–0
4	Belarus	10	4	1	5	19	14	+5	13		1–3	0–0	1–3	—	4–0	5–1
5	Kazakhstan	10	2	0	8	11	29	−18	6		0–4	1–3	1–2	1–5	—	3–0
6	Andorra	10	0	0	10	3	39	−36	0		0–2	0–6	0–2	1–3	1–3	—

=== Group 7 ===
Pos	Team	Pld	W	D	L	GF	GA	GD	Pts	Qualification	(Serbia)	(France)	(Austria)	(Lithuania)	(Romania)	(Faroe Islands)
1	Serbia	10	7	1	2	22	8	+14	22	Qualification to 2010 FIFA World Cup	—	1–1	1–0	3–0	5–0	2–0
2	France	10	6	3	1	18	9	+9	21	Advance to second round	2–1	—	3–1	1–0	1–1	5–0
3	Austria	10	4	2	4	14	15	−1	14		1–3	3–1	—	2–1	2–1	3–1
4	Lithuania	10	4	0	6	10	11	−1	12		2–1	0–1	2–0	—	0–1	1–0
5	Romania	10	3	3	4	12	18	−6	12		2–3	2–2	1–1	0–3	—	3–1
6	Faroe Islands	10	1	1	8	5	20	−15	4		0–2	0–1	1–1	2–1	0–1	—

=== Group 8 ===
Pos	Team	Pld	W	D	L	GF	GA	GD	Pts	Qualification	(Italy)	(Republic of Ireland)	(Bulgaria)	(Cyprus)	(Montenegro)	(Georgia (country))
1	Italy	10	7	3	0	18	7	+11	24	Qualification to 2010 FIFA World Cup	—	1–1	2–0	3–2	2–1	2–0
2	Republic of Ireland	10	4	6	0	12	8	+4	18	Advance to second round	2–2	—	1–1	1–0	0–0	2–1
3	Bulgaria	10	3	5	2	17	13	+4	14		0–0	1–1	—	2–0	4–1	6–2
4	Cyprus	10	2	3	5	14	16	−2	9		1–2	1–2	4–1	—	2–2	2–1
5	Montenegro	10	1	6	3	9	14	−5	9		0–2	0–0	2–2	1–1	—	2–1
6	Georgia	10	0	3	7	7	19	−12	3		0–2	1–2	0–0	1–1	0–0	—

=== Group 9 ===
Pos	Team	Pld	W	D	L	GF	GA	GD	Pts	Qualification	(Netherlands)	(Norway)	(Scotland)	(North Macedonia)	(Iceland)
1	Netherlands	8	8	0	0	17	2	+15	24	Qualification to 2010 FIFA World Cup	—	2–0	3–0	4–0	2–0
2	Norway	8	2	4	2	9	7	+2	10		0–1	—	4–0	2–1	2–2
3	Scotland	8	3	1	4	6	11	−5	10		0–1	0–0	—	2–0	2–1
4	Macedonia	8	2	1	5	5	11	−6	7		1–2	0–0	1–0	—	2–0
5	Iceland	8	1	2	5	7	13	−6	5		1–2	1–1	1–2	1–0	—

=== Ranking of second placed teams ===
Because Group 9 had one team fewer than the others, matches against the sixth placed team in each group were not included in this ranking, although this ultimately did not change who advanced to the playoffs. As a result, eight matches played by each team counted for the purposes of the second placed table.

Pos	Grp	Team	Pld	W	D	L	GF	GA	GD	Pts	Qualification
1	4	Russia	8	5	1	2	15	6	+9	16	Advance to second round (play-offs)
2	2	Greece	8	5	1	2	16	9	+7	16	Advance to second round (play-offs)
3	6	Ukraine	8	4	3	1	10	6	+4	15	Advance to second round (play-offs)
4	7	France	8	4	3	1	12	9	+3	15	Advance to second round (play-offs)
5	3	Slovenia	8	4	2	2	10	4	+6	14	Advance to second round (play-offs)
6	5	Bosnia and Herzegovina	8	4	1	3	19	12	+7	13	Advance to second round (play-offs)
7	1	Portugal	8	3	4	1	9	5	+4	13	Advance to second round (play-offs)
8	8	Republic of Ireland	8	2	6	0	8	6	+2	12	Advance to second round (play-offs)
9	9	Norway	8	2	4	2	9	7	+2	10	

== Second round ==
The UEFA second round (often referred to as the play off stage) was contested by the best eight runners up from the nine first round groups. The winners of each of four home and away ties joined the group winners in the World Cup finals in South Africa. Norway, with 10 points, was ranked 9th so failed to qualify for the second round.

=== Seeding and draw ===
The eight teams were seeded according to the FIFA World Rankings released on 16 October (shown in parentheses in the table below). The draw for the ties was held in Zürich on 19 October, with the top four teams seeded into one pot and the bottom four teams seeded into a second. A separate draw decided the host of the first leg.

Pot 1 (seeded)
Team	Pos
France	9
Portugal	10
Russia	12
Greece	16

Pot 2 (unseeded)
Team	Pos
Ukraine	22
Republic of Ireland	34
Bosnia and Herzegovina	42
Slovenia	49

=== Matches ===
Team 1	Agg.	Team 2	1st leg	2nd leg
Republic of Ireland	1–2	France	0–1	1–1 (aet)
Portugal	2–0	Bosnia and Herzegovina	1–0	1–0
Greece	1–0	Ukraine	0–0	1–0
Russia	2–2 (a)	Slovenia	2–1	0–1

== Qualified teams ==
The following 13 teams from UEFA qualified for the final tournament.

Team	Qualified as	Qualified on	Previous appearances in FIFA World Cup^{1}
Denmark	Group 1 winners	10 October 2009	3 (1986, 1998, 2002)
Switzerland	Group 2 winners	14 October 2009	8 (1934, 1938, 1950, 1954, 1962, 1966, 1994, 2006)
Slovakia	Group 3 winners	14 October 2009	0 (debut)
Germany	Group 4 winners	10 October 2009	16 (1934, 1938, **1954**^{2}, 1958^{2}, 1962^{2}, 1966^{2}, 1970^{2}, **1974**^{2}, 1978^{2}, 1982^{2}, 1986^{2}, **1990**^{2}, 1994, 1998, 2002, 2006)
Spain	Group 5 winners	9 September 2009	12 (1934, 1950, 1962, 1966, 1978, 1982, 1986, 1990, 1994, 1998, 2002, 2006)
England	Group 6 winners	9 September 2009	12 (1950, 1954, 1958, 1962, **1966**, 1970, 1982, 1986, 1990, 1998, 2002, 2006)
Serbia	Group 7 winners	10 October 2009	10 (1930^{3}, 1950^{3}, 1954^{3}, 1958^{3}, 1962^{3}, 1974^{3}, 1982^{3}, 1990^{3}, 1998^{3}, 2006^{3})
Italy	Group 8 winners	10 October 2009	16 (**1934**, **1938**, 1950, 1954, 1962, 1966, 1970, 1974, 1978, **1982**, 1986, 1990, 1994, 1998, 2002, **2006**)
Netherlands	Group 9 winners	6 June 2009	8 (1934, 1938, 1974, 1978, 1990, 1994, 1998, 2006)
Greece	Second round (play-off) winners	18 November 2009	1 (1994)
Slovenia	Second round (play-off) winners	18 November 2009	1 (2002)
Portugal	Second round (play-off) winners	18 November 2009	4 (1966, 1986, 2002, 2006)
France	Second round (play-off) winners	18 November 2009	12 (1930, 1934, 1938, 1954, 1958, 1966, 1978, 1982, 1986, **1998**, 2002, 2006)

^{1} Bold indicates champions for that year. Italic indicates hosts for that year.
^{2} Competed as West Germany. A separate team for East Germany also participated in qualifications during this time, having only competed in 1974.
^{3} From 1930 to 1998, Serbia competed together with Bosnia and Herzegovina, Croatia, North Macedonia, Montenegro and Slovenia as part of Yugoslavia, while in 2006 as Serbia and Montenegro together with Montenegro.
^{4} From 1934 to 1990, Slovakia competed as Czechoslovakia.

== Top goalscorers ==
There were 725 goals scored in 268 matches, for an average of 2.71 goals per match.

10 goals

- (Greece) Theofanis Gekas

9 goals

- (Bosnia and Herzegovina) Edin Džeko
- (England) Wayne Rooney

7 goals

- (Germany) Miroslav Klose
- (Spain) David Villa

6 goals

- (Austria) Marc Janko
- (Belgium) Wesley Sonck
- (Germany) Lukas Podolski
- (Republic of Ireland) Robbie Keane
- (Israel) Elyaniv Barda
- (Poland) Ebi Smolarek
- (Slovakia) Stanislav Šesták
- (Ukraine) Andriy Shevchenko

Below are full goalscorer lists for all groups and the play-off rounds:

- Group 1
- Group 2
- Group 3
- Group 4
- Group 5
- Group 6
- Group 7
- Group 8
- Group 9
- Play-offs
