= UEFA 2010 =

UEFA 2010 may refer to:

- 2010 FIFA World Cup qualification (UEFA)
- 2009–10 UEFA Champions League
- 2010–11 UEFA Champions League
- 2009–10 UEFA Europa League
- 2010–11 UEFA Europa League
