= 2010 FIFA World Cup qualification – UEFA Group 4 =

Football tournament qualification stage

The 2010 FIFA World Cup qualification UEFA Group 4 was a UEFA qualifying group for the 2010 FIFA World Cup. The group comprised 2006 FIFA World Cup hosts Germany along with Russia, Finland, Wales, Azerbaijan and Liechtenstein.

The group was won by Germany, who qualified for the 2010 FIFA World Cup. The runners-up Russia entered the UEFA play-off stage.

== Standings ==
Pos	Team	Pld	W	D	L	GF	GA	GD	Pts	Qualification	(Germany)	(Russia)	(Finland)	(Wales)	(Azerbaijan)	(Liechtenstein)
1	Germany	10	8	2	0	26	5	+21	26	Qualification to 2010 FIFA World Cup	—	2–1	1–1	1–0	4–0	4–0
2	Russia	10	7	1	2	19	6	+13	22	Advance to second round	0–1	—	3–0	2–1	2–0	3–0
3	Finland	10	5	3	2	14	14	0	18		3–3	0–3	—	2–1	1–0	2–1
4	Wales	10	4	0	6	9	12	−3	12		0–2	1–3	0–2	—	1–0	2–0
5	Azerbaijan	10	1	2	7	4	14	−10	5		0–2	1–1	1–2	0–1	—	0–0
6	Liechtenstein	10	0	2	8	2	23	−21	2		0–6	0–1	1–1	0–2	0–2	—

== Matches ==
The fixtures for the group were determined on 10 January 2008, after a meeting between representatives of each nation in Frankfurt, Germany. The August 2009 date in the international match calendar was moved forward by one week, from 19 August 2009 to 12 August 2009, at the FIFA Executive Committee meeting on 27 May 2008.

6 September 2008
15:00 UTC+1

Wales	1–0	Azerbaijan
Vokes 83'	Report

Millennium Stadium, Cardiff
Attendance: 17,106
Referee: Aleksandar Stavrev (Macedonia)
6 September 2008
20:45 UTC+2

Liechtenstein	0–6	Germany
	Report	Podolski 21', 48'; Rolfes 64'; Schweinsteiger 65'; Hitzlsperger 75'; Westermann 86'

Rheinpark Stadion, Vaduz
Attendance: 6,021
Referee: Duarte Gomes (Portugal)

10 September 2008
19:00 UTC+4

Russia	2–1	Wales
Pavlyuchenko 22' (pen.); Pogrebnyak 81'	Report	Ledley 67'

Lokomotiv Stadium, Moscow
Attendance: 28,000
Referee: Damir Skomina (Slovenia)
10 September 2008
21:00 UTC+5

Azerbaijan	0–0	Liechtenstein
	Report

Tofik Bakhramov Stadium, Baku
Attendance: 25,000
Referee: Tsvetan Georgiev (Bulgaria)
10 September 2008
20:35 UTC+3

Finland	3–3	Germany
Johansson 33'; Väyrynen 43'; Sjölund 53'	Report	Klose 38', 45', 83'

Helsinki Olympic Stadium, Helsinki
Attendance: 37,150
Referee: Viktor Kassai (Hungary)

11 October 2008
17:00 UTC+3

Finland	1–0	Azerbaijan
Forssell 61' (pen.)	Report

Helsinki Olympic Stadium, Helsinki
Attendance: 22,480
Referee: William Collum (Scotland)
11 October 2008
17:30 UTC+1

Wales	2–0	Liechtenstein
Edwards 42'; Frick 80' (o.g.)	Report

Millennium Stadium, Cardiff
Attendance: 13,356
Referee: Thomas Vejlgaard (Denmark)
11 October 2008
20:45 UTC+2

Germany	2–1	Russia
Podolski 9'; Ballack 28'	Report	Arshavin 51'

Signal Iduna Park, Dortmund
Attendance: 65,607
Referee: Peter Fröjdfeldt (Sweden)

15 October 2008
19:00 UTC+4

Russia	3–0	Finland
Pasanen 23' (o.g.); Lampi 65' (o.g.); Arshavin 88'	Report

Lokomotiv Stadium, Moscow
Attendance: 28,000
Referee: Kyros Vassaras (Greece)
15 October 2008
20:45 UTC+2

Germany	1–0	Wales
Trochowski 72'	Report

Borussia-Park, Mönchengladbach
Attendance: 44,500
Referee: Laurent Duhamel (France)

28 March 2009
17:00 UTC+3

Russia	2–0	Azerbaijan
Pavlyuchenko 32'; Zyryanov 71'	Report

Luzhniki Stadium, Moscow
Attendance: 62,000
Referee: Serge Gumienny (Belgium)
28 March 2009
15:00 UTC+0

Wales	0–2	Finland
	Report	Johansson 42'; Kuqi 90+1'

Millennium Stadium, Cardiff
Attendance: 22,604
Referee: Eduardo Iturralde González (Spain)
28 March 2009
20:00 UTC+1

Germany	4–0	Liechtenstein
Ballack 4'; Jansen 9'; Schweinsteiger 48'; Podolski 50'	Report

Zentralstadion, Leipzig
Attendance: 43,368
Referee: Igor Ishchenko (Ukraine)

1 April 2009
19:30 UTC+2

Liechtenstein	0–1	Russia
	Report	Zyryanov 38'

Rheinpark Stadion, Vaduz
Attendance: 5,679
Referee: David McKeon (Republic of Ireland)
1 April 2009
19:45 UTC+1

Wales	0–2	Germany
	Report	Ballack 11'; Williams 48' (o.g.)

Millennium Stadium, Cardiff
Attendance: 26,064
Referee: Terje Hauge (Norway)

6 June 2009
20:00 UTC+5

Azerbaijan	0–1	Wales
	Report	Edwards 42'

Tofik Bakhramov Stadium, Baku
Attendance: 26,728
Referee: Markus Strombergsson (Sweden)
6 June 2009
19:00 UTC+3

Finland	2–1	Liechtenstein
Forssell 33'; Johansson 71'	Report	Frick 13'

Helsinki Olympic Stadium, Helsinki
Attendance: 20,319
Referee: Libor Kovařík (Czech Republic)

10 June 2009
20:30 UTC+3

Finland	0–3	Russia
	Report	Kerzhakov 26', 53'; Zyryanov 71'

Helsinki Olympic Stadium, Helsinki
Attendance: 37,028
Referee: Konrad Plautz (Austria)

12 August 2009
21:00 UTC+5

Azerbaijan	0–2	Germany
	Report	Schweinsteiger 11'; Klose 53'

Tofik Bakhramov Stadium, Baku
Attendance: 22,500
Referee: Alan Kelly (Republic of Ireland)

5 September 2009
20:00 UTC+5

Azerbaijan	1–2	Finland
Məmmədov 49'	Report	Tihinen 74'; Johansson 85'

Lankaran City Stadium, Lankaran
Attendance: 12,000
Referee: Stelios Trifonos (Cyprus)
5 September 2009
19:00 UTC+4

Russia	3–0	Liechtenstein
V. Berezutski 17'; Pavlyuchenko 40' (pen.), 45' (pen.)	Report

Petrovsky Stadium, Saint Petersburg
Attendance: 20,500
Referee: Augustus Constantin (Romania)

9 September 2009
19:30 UTC+2

Liechtenstein	1–1	Finland
Polverino 75'	Report	Litmanen 74' (pen.)

Rheinpark Stadion, Vaduz
Attendance: 3,132
Referee: Novo Panić (Bosnia and Herzegovina)
9 September 2009
20:45 UTC+2

Germany	4–0	Azerbaijan
Ballack 14' (pen.); Klose 55', 65'; Podolski 71'	Report

AWD-Arena, Hanover
Attendance: 35,369
Referee: Anastasios Kakos (Greece)
9 September 2009
19:45 UTC+1

Wales	1–3	Russia
Collins 53'	Report	Semshov 36'; Ignashevich 71'; Pavlyuchenko 90+1'

Millennium Stadium, Cardiff
Attendance: 14,505
Referee: Jorge Sousa (Portugal)

10 October 2009
17:00 UTC+3

Finland	2–1	Wales
Porokara 5'; Moisander 77'	Report	Bellamy 17'

Helsinki Olympic Stadium, Helsinki
Attendance: 14,000
Referee: Milorad Mažić (Serbia)
10 October 2009
19:00 UTC+4

Russia	0–1	Germany
	Report	Klose 35'

Luzhniki Stadium, Moscow
Attendance: 72,100
Referee: Massimo Busacca (Switzerland)
10 October 2009
20:00 UTC+2

Liechtenstein	0–2	Azerbaijan
	Report	Javadov 55'; Məmmədov 82'

Rheinpark Stadion, Vaduz
Attendance: 1,635
Referee: Pavle Radovanović (Montenegro)

14 October 2009
21:00 UTC+5

Azerbaijan	1–1	Russia
Javadov 54'	Report	Arshavin 13'

Tofik Bakhramov Stadium, Baku
Attendance: 17,000
Referee: Howard Webb (England)
14 October 2009
18:00 UTC+2

Germany	1–1	Finland
Podolski 90'	Report	Johansson 11'

HSH Nordbank Arena, Hamburg
Attendance: 51,500
Referee: Martin Atkinson (England)
14 October 2009
20:00 UTC+2

Liechtenstein	0–2	Wales
	Report	Vaughan 16'; Ramsey 80'

Rheinpark Stadion, Vaduz
Attendance: 1,858
Referee: Sten Kaldma (Estonia)

== Goalscorers ==
There were 74 goals scored in 30 matches, for an average of 2.47 goals per match.

7 goals

- (Germany) Miroslav Klose

6 goals

- (Germany) Lukas Podolski

5 goals

- (Finland) Jonatan Johansson
- (Russia) Roman Pavlyuchenko

4 goals

- (Germany) Michael Ballack

3 goals

- (Germany) Bastian Schweinsteiger
- (Russia) Andrei Arshavin
- (Russia) Konstantin Zyryanov

2 goals

- (Azerbaijan) Vagif Javadov
- (Azerbaijan) Elvin Mammadov
- (Finland) Mikael Forssell
- (Russia) Aleksandr Kerzhakov
- (Wales) David Edwards

1 goal

- (Finland) Shefki Kuqi
- (Finland) Jari Litmanen
- (Finland) Niklas Moisander
- (Finland) Roni Porokara
- (Finland) Daniel Sjölund
- (Finland) Hannu Tihinen
- (Finland) Mika Väyrynen
- (Germany) Thomas Hitzlsperger
- (Germany) Marcell Jansen
- (Germany) Simon Rolfes
- (Germany) Piotr Trochowski
- (Germany) Heiko Westermann
- (Liechtenstein) Mario Frick
- (Liechtenstein) Michele Polverino
- (Russia) Vasili Berezutski
- (Russia) Sergei Ignashevich
- (Russia) Pavel Pogrebnyak
- (Russia) Igor Semshov
- (Wales) Craig Bellamy
- (Wales) James Collins
- (Wales) Joe Ledley
- (Wales) Aaron Ramsey
- (Wales) David Vaughan
- (Wales) Sam Vokes

1 own goal

- (Finland) Petri Pasanen (against Russia)
- (Finland) Veli Lampi (against Russia)
- (Liechtenstein) Mario Frick (against Wales)
- (Wales) Ashley Williams (against Germany)

== Attendances ==
Team	Highest	Lowest	Average
Azerbaijan	26,728	12,000	22,046
Finland	37,150	14,000	26,195
Germany	65,607	35,369	48,069
Liechtenstein	6,021	1,635	3,665
Russia	72,100	21,000	42,020
Wales	26,064	13,356	18,727
