= 2010 FIFA World Cup qualification – UEFA Group 8 =

Football tournament qualifying stage

The 2010 FIFA World Cup qualification UEFA Group 8 was a UEFA qualifying group for the 2010 FIFA World Cup. The group comprised 2006 FIFA World Cup winner Italy, Bulgaria, Republic of Ireland, Cyprus, Georgia and Montenegro.

The group was won by Italy, who qualified for the 2010 FIFA World Cup. The runners-up the Republic of Ireland entered the UEFA play-off stage.

== Standings ==
Pos	Team	Pld	W	D	L	GF	GA	GD	Pts	Qualification	(Italy)	(Republic of Ireland)	(Bulgaria)	(Cyprus)	(Montenegro)	(Georgia (country))
1	Italy	10	7	3	0	18	7	+11	24	Qualification to 2010 FIFA World Cup	—	1–1	2–0	3–2	2–1	2–0
2	Republic of Ireland	10	4	6	0	12	8	+4	18	Advance to second round	2–2	—	1–1	1–0	0–0	2–1
3	Bulgaria	10	3	5	2	17	13	+4	14		0–0	1–1	—	2–0	4–1	6–2
4	Cyprus	10	2	3	5	14	16	−2	9		1–2	1–2	4–1	—	2–2	2–1
5	Montenegro	10	1	6	3	9	14	−5	9		0–2	0–0	2–2	1–1	—	2–1
6	Georgia	10	0	3	7	7	19	−12	3		0–2	1–2	0–0	1–1	0–0	—

== Matches ==
The representatives of the six federations met in Sofia, Bulgaria on 15 January 2008 to decide on a fixture calendar.

6 September 2008
18:00 UTC+2

Georgia	1–2	Republic of Ireland
Kenia 90+2'	Report	Doyle 13'; Whelan 70'

Stadion am Bruchweg, Mainz (Germany) (Note: Originally scheduled for Tbilisi, Georgia but moved to neutral venue due to the 2008 South Ossetia war. The original replacement venue was the Wildparkstadion in Karlsruhe, Germany, but the ground became unavailable, so it was moved to the Stadion am Bruchweg in Mainz.)
Attendance: 4,500
Referee: Sándor Andó-Szabó (Hungary)
6 September 2008
20:00 UTC+2

Montenegro	2–2	Bulgaria
Vučinić 61'; Jovetić 82' (pen.)	Report	S. Petrov 11'; Georgiev 90+2'

Pod Goricom, Podgorica
Attendance: 9,000
Referee: Oleh Oriekhov (Ukraine)
6 September 2008
21:45 UTC+3

Cyprus	1–2	Italy
Aloneftis 28'	Report	Di Natale 8', 90+2'

Antonis Papadopoulos Stadium, Larnaca
Attendance: 6,000
Referee: Pieter Vink (Netherlands)

10 September 2008
19:00 UTC+2

Montenegro	0–0	Republic of Ireland
	Report

Pod Goricom, Podgorica
Attendance: 12,000
Referee: Sten Kaldma (Estonia)
10 September 2008
20:50 UTC+2

Italy	2–0	Georgia
De Rossi 17', 89'	Report

Stadio Friuli, Udine
Attendance: 27,164
Referee: Thomas Einwaller (Austria)

11 October 2008
20:30 UTC+4

Georgia	1–1	Cyprus
Kobiashvili 73'	Report	Konstantinou 66'

Boris Paichadze Stadium, Tbilisi
Attendance: 40,000
Referee: Radek Matějek (Czech Republic)
11 October 2008
21:15 UTC+3

Bulgaria	0–0	Italy
	Report

Vasil Levski National Stadium, Sofia
Attendance: 35,000
Referee: Stéphane Lannoy (France)

15 October 2008
20:30 UTC+4

Georgia	0–0	Bulgaria
	Report

Boris Paichadze Stadium, Tbilisi
Attendance: 35,250
Referee: Björn Kuipers (Netherlands)
15 October 2008
19:45 UTC+1

Republic of Ireland	1–0	Cyprus
Keane 5'	Report

Croke Park, Dublin
Attendance: 55,833
Referee: Alexandru Tudor (Romania)
15 October 2008
20:50 UTC+2

Italy	2–1	Montenegro
Aquilani 8', 29'	Report	Vučinić 19'

Via del Mare, Lecce
Attendance: 20,162
Referee: Pedro Proença (Portugal)

11 February 2009
19:45 UTC+0

Republic of Ireland	2–1	Georgia
Keane 73' (pen.), 78'	Report	Iashvili 1'

Croke Park, Dublin
Attendance: 45,000
Referee: Jouni Hyytiä (Finland)

28 March 2009
20:00 UTC+2

Cyprus	2–1	Georgia
Konstantinou 33'; Christofi 56'	Report	Kobiashvili 71' (pen.)

Antonis Papadopoulos Stadium, Larnaca
Attendance: 1,500
Referee: Fredy Fautrel (France)
28 March 2009
20:45 UTC+1

Montenegro	0–2	Italy
	Report	Pirlo 11' (pen.); Pazzini 73'

Pod Goricom, Podgorica
Attendance: 10,500
Referee: Martin Atkinson (England)
28 March 2009
19:45 UTC+0

Republic of Ireland	1–1	Bulgaria
Dunne 1'	Report	Kilbane 74' (o.g.)

Croke Park, Dublin
Attendance: 60,002
Referee: Ivan Bebek (Croatia)

1 April 2009
18:00 UTC+3

Bulgaria	2–0	Cyprus
Popov 8'; Makriev 90+4'	Report

Vasil Levski National Stadium, Sofia
Attendance: 16,916
Referee: Martin Ingvarsson (Sweden)
1 April 2009
21:00 UTC+4

Georgia	0–0	Montenegro
	Report

Boris Paichadze Stadium, Tbilisi
Attendance: 16,000
Referee: David Malcolm (Northern Ireland)
1 April 2009
20:50 UTC+2

Italy	1–1	Republic of Ireland
Iaquinta 10'	Report	Keane 87'

Stadio San Nicola, Bari
Attendance: 48,000
Referee: Wolfgang Stark (Germany)

6 June 2009
20:30 UTC+3

Bulgaria	1–1	Republic of Ireland
Telkiyski 29'	Report	Dunne 24'

Vasil Levski National Stadium, Sofia
Attendance: 38,000
Referee: Claus Bo Larsen (Denmark)
6 June 2009
20:30 UTC+3

Cyprus	2–2	Montenegro
Konstantinou 13'; Michael 45' (pen.)	Report	Damjanović 65', 77'

Antonis Papadopoulos Stadium, Larnaca
Attendance: 3,000
Referee: Carlos Velasco Carballo (Spain)

5 September 2009
20:30 UTC+3

Bulgaria	4–1	Montenegro
Kishishev 45+1'; Telkiyski 49'; Berbatov 83' (pen.); Domovchiyski 90+1'	Report	Jovetić 9'

Vasil Levski National Stadium, Sofia
Attendance: 7,543
Referee: Tony Asumaa (Finland)
5 September 2009
22:00 UTC+4

Georgia	0–2	Italy
	Report	Kaladze 56', 66' (o.g.)

Boris Paichadze Stadium, Tbilisi
Attendance: 32,000
Referee: Marcin Borski (Poland)
5 September 2009
21:30 UTC+3

Cyprus	1–2	Republic of Ireland
Elia 30'	Report	Doyle 5'; Keane 83'

GSP Stadium, Nicosia
Attendance: 5,191
Referee: Thomas Einwaller (Austria)

9 September 2009
20:15 UTC+2

Montenegro	1–1	Cyprus
Vučinić 56' (pen.)	Report	Okkas 63'

Pod Goricom, Podgorica
Attendance: 4,000
Referee: Carlo Bertolini (Switzerland)
9 September 2009
20:50 UTC+2

Italy	2–0	Bulgaria
Grosso 11'; Iaquinta 40'	Report

Stadio Olimpico, Turin
Attendance: 26,122
Referee: Florian Meyer (Germany)

10 October 2009
20:00 UTC+3

Cyprus	4–1	Bulgaria
Charalambides 11', 20'; Konstantinou 58'; Aloneftis 78'	Report	Berbatov 44'

Antonis Papadopoulos Stadium, Larnaca
Attendance: 3,700
Referee: Paul Allaerts (Belgium)
10 October 2009
19:00 UTC+2

Montenegro	2–1	Georgia
Batak 13'; Delibašić 78'	Report	Dvalishvili 45'

Pod Goricom, Podgorica
Attendance: 5,420
Referee: Selçuk Dereli (Turkey)
10 October 2009
20:00 UTC+1

Republic of Ireland	2–2	Italy
Whelan 8'; St Ledger 87'	Report	Camoranesi 26'; Gilardino 90'

Croke Park, Dublin
Attendance: 70,670
Referee: Terje Hauge (Norway)

14 October 2009
21:00 UTC+3

Bulgaria	6–2	Georgia
Berbatov 6', 23', 35'; M. Petrov 14', 44'; Angelov 31'	Report	Dvalishvili 34'; Kobiashvili 51' (pen.)

Vasil Levski National Stadium, Sofia
Attendance: 700
Referee: Kristinn Jakobsson (Iceland)
14 October 2009
20:00 UTC+2

Italy	3–2	Cyprus
Gilardino 78', 81', 90+2'	Report	Makrides 12'; Michael 48'

Stadio Ennio Tardini, Parma
Attendance: 15,009
Referee: Alon Yefet (Israel)
14 October 2009
19:00 UTC+1

Republic of Ireland	0–0	Montenegro
	Report

Croke Park, Dublin
Attendance: 36,442
Referee: Vladimír Hriňák (Slovakia)

== Goalscorers ==
There were 77 goals scored in 30 matches, for an average of 2.57 goals per match.

5 goals

- (Bulgaria) Dimitar Berbatov
- (Republic of Ireland) Robbie Keane

4 goals

- (Cyprus) Michalis Konstantinou
- (Italy) Alberto Gilardino

3 goals

- (Georgia (country)) Levan Kobiashvili
- (Montenegro) Mirko Vučinić

2 goals

- (Bulgaria) Dimitar Telkiyski
- (Bulgaria) Martin Petrov
- (Cyprus) Efstathios Aloneftis
- (Cyprus) Constantinos Charalambides
- (Cyprus) Chrysis Michael
- (Cyprus) Ioannis Okkas
- (Georgia (country)) Vladimir Dvalishvili
- (Republic of Ireland) Richard Dunne
- (Republic of Ireland) Kevin Doyle
- (Republic of Ireland) Glenn Whelan
- (Italy) Alberto Aquilani
- (Italy) Daniele De Rossi
- (Italy) Antonio Di Natale
- (Italy) Vincenzo Iaquinta
- (Montenegro) Dejan Damjanović
- (Montenegro) Stevan Jovetić

1 goal

- (Bulgaria) Stanislav Angelov
- (Bulgaria) Valeri Domovchiyski
- (Bulgaria) Blagoy Georgiev
- (Bulgaria) Radostin Kishishev
- (Bulgaria) Dimitar Makriev
- (Bulgaria) Stiliyan Petrov
- (Bulgaria) Ivelin Popov
- (Cyprus) Demetris Christofi
- (Cyprus) Marios Elia
- (Georgia (country)) Alexander Iashvili
- (Georgia (country)) Levan Kenia
- (Italy) Mauro Camoranesi
- (Italy) Fabio Grosso
- (Italy) Giampaolo Pazzini
- (Italy) Andrea Pirlo
- (Republic of Ireland) Seán St Ledger
- (Montenegro) Radoslav Batak
- (Montenegro) Andrija Delibašić

1 own goal

- (Republic of Ireland) Kevin Kilbane (against Bulgaria)

2 own goals

- (Georgia (country)) Kakha Kaladze (against Italy)

== Attendances ==
Team	Highest	Lowest	Average
Bulgaria	45,000	700	22,432
Cyprus	6,000	1,500	3,878
Georgia	40,000	4,500	25,550
Italy	48,000	15,009	27,291
Montenegro	12,000	4,000	8,184
Republic of Ireland	70,670	36,442	53,589
