= 2010 FIFA World Cup qualification – UEFA Group 1 =

Football tournament qualification stage

The 2010 FIFA World Cup qualification UEFA Group 1 was a UEFA qualifying group for the 2010 FIFA World Cup. The group comprised 2006 fourth-place finishers Portugal, along with Sweden, Denmark, Hungary, Albania and Malta.

The group was won by Denmark, who qualified for the 2010 FIFA World Cup. The runners-up Portugal entered the UEFA play-off stage.

== Standings ==
Pos	Team	Pld	W	D	L	GF	GA	GD	Pts	Qualification	(Denmark)	(Portugal)	(Sweden)	(Hungary)	(Albania)	(Malta)
1	Denmark	10	6	3	1	16	5	+11	21	Qualification to 2010 FIFA World Cup	—	1–1	1–0	0–1	3–0	3–0
2	Portugal	10	5	4	1	17	5	+12	19	Advance to second round	2–3	—	0–0	3–0	0–0	4–0
3	Sweden	10	5	3	2	13	5	+8	18		0–1	0–0	—	2–1	4–1	4–0
4	Hungary	10	5	1	4	10	8	+2	16		0–0	0–1	1–2	—	2–0	3–0
5	Albania	10	1	4	5	6	13	−7	7		1–1	1–2	0–0	0–1	—	3–0
6	Malta	10	0	1	9	0	26	−26	1		0–3	0–4	0–1	0–1	0–0	—

== Matches ==
The match schedule was determined on 6 January 2008 at a meeting in Copenhagen, Denmark.

6 September 2008
18:45 UTC+2

Albania	0–0	Sweden
	Report

Qemal Stafa, Tirana
Attendance: 21,522
Referee: Alberto Undiano Mallenco (Spain)
6 September 2008
19:45 UTC+2

Hungary	0–0	Denmark
	Report

Ferenc Puskás Stadium, Budapest
Attendance: 18,984
Referee: Alain Hamer (Luxembourg)
6 September 2008
20:00 UTC+2

Malta	0–4	Portugal
	Report	Said 26' (o.g.); Almeida 61'; Simão 72'; Nani 78'

Ta' Qali Stadium, Ta' Qali
Attendance: 11,000
Referee: Kevin Blom (Netherlands)

10 September 2008
20:15 UTC+2

Sweden	2–1	Hungary
Källström 55'; Holmén 64'	Report	Rudolf 90+3'

Råsunda Stadium, Solna
Attendance: 28,177
Referee: Florian Meyer (Germany)
10 September 2008
20:45 UTC+2

Albania	3–0	Malta
Bogdani 45+1'; Duro 84'; Dallku 90'	Report

Qemal Stafa, Tirana
Attendance: 13,400
Referee: Robert Schörgenhofer (Austria)
10 September 2008
20:45 UTC+1

Portugal	2–3	Denmark
Nani 42'; Deco 86' (pen.)	Report	Bendtner 84'; C. Poulsen 88'; D. Jensen 90+2'

Estádio José Alvalade, Lisbon
Attendance: 33,000
Referee: Howard Webb (England)

11 October 2008
19:45 UTC+2

Hungary	2–0	Albania
Torghelle 49'; Juhász 82'	Report

Ferenc Puskás Stadium, Budapest
Attendance: 18,000
Referee: Claudio Circhetta (Switzerland)
11 October 2008
20:00 UTC+2

Denmark	3–0	Malta
S. Larsen 10', 46'; Agger 29' (pen.)	Report

Parken Stadium, Copenhagen
Attendance: 33,124
Referee: Levan Paniashvili (Georgia)
11 October 2008
20:00 UTC+2

Sweden	0–0	Portugal
	Report

Råsunda Stadium, Solna
Attendance: 33,241
Referee: Roberto Rosetti (Italy)

15 October 2008
19:30 UTC+2

Malta	0–1	Hungary
	Report	Torghelle 23'

Ta' Qali Stadium, Ta' Qali
Attendance: 4,797
Referee: Johannes Valgeirsson (Iceland)
15 October 2008
20:45 UTC+1

Portugal	0–0	Albania
	Report

Estádio AXA, Braga
Attendance: 29,500
Referee: Knut Kircher (Germany)

11 February 2009
19:30 UTC+1

Malta	0–0	Albania
	Report

Ta' Qali Stadium, Ta' Qali
Attendance: 2,041
Referee: Alexandru Deaconu (Romania)

28 March 2009
20:00 UTC+1

Malta	0–3	Denmark
	Report	S. Larsen 12', 23'; Nordstrand 89'

Ta' Qali Stadium, Ta' Qali
Attendance: 6,235
Referee: Tomasz Mikulski (Poland)
28 March 2009
20:30 UTC+1

Albania	0–1	Hungary
	Report	Torghelle 38'

Qemal Stafa, Tirana
Attendance: 12,000
Referee: Björn Kuipers (Netherlands)
28 March 2009
20:45 UTC+0

Portugal	0–0	Sweden
	Report

Estádio do Dragão, Porto
Attendance: 40,200
Referee: Frank De Bleeckere (Belgium)

1 April 2009
19:00 UTC+2

Hungary	3–0	Malta
Hajnal 7'; Gera 81'; Juhász 90+3'	Report

Ferenc Puskás Stadium, Budapest
Attendance: 34,400
Referee: Stanislav Sukhina (Russia)
1 April 2009
20:15 UTC+2

Denmark	3–0	Albania
L. Andreasen 31'; S. Larsen 37'; C. Poulsen 80'	Report

Parken Stadium, Copenhagen
Attendance: 24,320
Referee: Damir Skomina (Slovenia)

6 June 2009
20:00 UTC+2

Sweden	0–1	Denmark
	Report	Kahlenberg 22'

Råsunda Stadium, Solna
Attendance: 33,619
Referee: Mike Riley (England)
6 June 2009
20:45 UTC+2

Albania	1–2	Portugal
Bogdani 29'	Report	Almeida 27'; Alves 90+2'

Qemal Stafa, Tirana
Attendance: 18,320
Referee: Florian Meyer (Germany)

10 June 2009
19:00 UTC+2

Sweden	4–0	Malta
Källström 22'; Majstorović 52'; Ibrahimović 56'; Berg 58'	Report

Ullevi, Gothenburg
Attendance: 25,271
Referee: Calum Murray (Scotland)

5 September 2009
20:00 UTC+2

Denmark	1–1	Portugal
Bendtner 43'	Report	Liédson 86'

Parken Stadium, Copenhagen
Attendance: 37,998
Referee: Massimo Busacca (Switzerland)
5 September 2009
20:00 UTC+2

Hungary	1–2	Sweden
Huszti 79' (pen.)	Report	Mellberg 9'; Ibrahimović 90+3'

Ferenc Puskás Stadium, Budapest
Attendance: 40,169
Referee: Nicola Rizzoli (Italy)

9 September 2009
18:30 UTC+2

Malta	0–1	Sweden
	Report	Azzopardi 82' (o.g.)

Ta' Qali Stadium, Ta' Qali
Attendance: 4,705
Referee: Adrian McCourt (Northern Ireland)
9 September 2009
20:30 UTC+2

Albania	1–1	Denmark
Bogdani 51'	Report	Bendtner 40'

Qemal Stafa, Tirana
Attendance: 18,000
Referee: Cüneyt Çakır (Turkey)
9 September 2009
20:45 UTC+2

Hungary	0–1	Portugal
	Report	Pepe 10'

Ferenc Puskás Stadium, Budapest
Attendance: 42,000
Referee: Stéphane Lannoy (France)

10 October 2009
20:00 UTC+2

Denmark	1–0	Sweden
J. Poulsen 78'	Report

Parken Stadium, Copenhagen
Attendance: 37,800
Referee: Manuel Mejuto González (Spain)
10 October 2009
20:45 UTC+1

Portugal	3–0	Hungary
Simão 18', 79'; Liédson 74'	Report

Estádio da Luz, Lisbon
Attendance: 50,115
Referee: Alain Hamer (Luxembourg)

14 October 2009
20:45 UTC+2

Denmark	0–1	Hungary
	Report	Buzsáky 35'

Parken Stadium, Copenhagen
Attendance: 36,966
Referee: Florian Meyer (Germany)
14 October 2009
19:45 UTC+1

Portugal	4–0	Malta
Nani 14'; Simão 45'; Veloso 52'; Edinho 90'	Report

Estádio D. Afonso Henriques, Guimarães
Attendance: 29,350
Referee: Alan Kelly (Republic of Ireland)
14 October 2009
20:45 UTC+2

Sweden	4–1	Albania
Mellberg 6', 42'; Berg 40'; Svensson 86'	Report	Salihi 56'

Råsunda Stadium, Solna
Attendance: 25,342
Referee: Nikolai Ivanov (Russia)

== Goalscorers ==
There were 62 goals scored in 30 matches, for an average of 2.07 goals per match.

5 goals

- (Denmark) Søren Larsen

4 goals

- (Portugal) Simão

3 goals

- (Albania) Erjon Bogdani
- (Denmark) Nicklas Bendtner
- (Hungary) Sándor Torghelle
- (Portugal) Nani
- (Sweden) Olof Mellberg

2 goals

- (Denmark) Christian Poulsen
- (Hungary) Roland Juhász
- (Portugal) Hugo Almeida
- (Portugal) Liédson
- (Sweden) Marcus Berg
- (Sweden) Zlatan Ibrahimović
- (Sweden) Kim Källström

1 goal

- (Albania) Armend Dallku
- (Albania) Klodian Duro
- (Albania) Hamdi Salihi
- (Denmark) Daniel Agger
- (Denmark) Leon Andreasen
- (Denmark) Daniel Jensen
- (Denmark) Thomas Kahlenberg
- (Denmark) Morten Nordstrand
- (Denmark) Jakob Poulsen
- (Hungary) Ákos Buzsáky
- (Hungary) Zoltán Gera
- (Hungary) Tamás Hajnal
- (Hungary) Szabolcs Huszti
- (Hungary) Gergely Rudolf
- (Portugal) Bruno Alves
- (Portugal) Deco
- (Portugal) Edinho
- (Portugal) Miguel Veloso
- (Portugal) Pepe
- (Sweden) Anders Svensson
- (Sweden) Samuel Holmén
- (Sweden) Daniel Majstorović

1 own goal

- (Malta) Ian Azzopardi (against Sweden)
- (Malta) Brian Said (against Portugal)

== Attendances ==
Team	Highest	Lowest	Average
Albania	18,522	8,400	14,848
Denmark	37,998	24,320	34,042
Hungary	42,000	18,000	30,711
Malta	11,000	2,041	5,756
Portugal	50,115	29,350	36,433
Sweden	33,619	25,271	29,130

== See also ==
- Denmark–Sweden football rivalry
