= 2010 FIFA World Cup qualification – UEFA Group 2 =

Football tournament qualification stage

The 2010 FIFA World Cup qualification UEFA Group 2 was a UEFA qualifying group for the 2010 FIFA World Cup. The group comprised Greece, Israel, Switzerland, Moldova, Latvia and Luxembourg.

The group was won by Switzerland, who qualified for the 2010 FIFA World Cup. The runners-up Greece entered the UEFA play-off stage.

== Standings ==
Pos	Team	Pld	W	D	L	GF	GA	GD	Pts	Qualification	(Switzerland)	(Greece)	(Latvia)	(Israel)	(Luxembourg)	(Moldova)
1	Switzerland	10	6	3	1	18	8	+10	21	Qualification to 2010 FIFA World Cup	—	2–0	2–1	0–0	1–2	2–0
2	Greece	10	6	2	2	20	10	+10	20	Advance to second round	1–2	—	5–2	2–1	2–1	3–0
3	Latvia	10	5	2	3	18	15	+3	17		2–2	0–2	—	1–1	2–0	3–2
4	Israel	10	4	4	2	20	10	+10	16		2–2	1–1	0–1	—	7–0	3–1
5	Luxembourg	10	1	2	7	4	25	−21	5		0–3	0–3	0–4	1–3	—	0–0
6	Moldova	10	0	3	7	6	18	−12	3		0–2	1–1	1–2	1–2	0–0	—

== Matches ==
The match schedule was established at a meeting in Israel on 8 January 2008. However, Greece and Latvia failed to come to an agreement on matches between themselves, and, since the match schedule was not finalised by 16 January 2008 deadline, FIFA conducted a random draw to determine the fixtures. The draw took place in Zagreb, Croatia at 16:00 CET on 30 January 2008, the eve of the XXXII Ordinary UEFA Congress.

6 September 2008
19:00 UTC+3

Moldova	1–2	Latvia
Alexeev 76'	Report	Karlsons 8'; Astafjevs 22'

Sheriff Stadium, Tiraspol
Attendance: 4,300
Referee: Mark Courtney (Northern Ireland)
6 September 2008
20:55 UTC+3

Israel	2–2	Switzerland
Benayoun 73'; Sahar 90+2'	Report	Yakin 45'; Nkufo 56'

Ramat Gan Stadium, Ramat Gan
Attendance: 29,600
Referee: Martin Hansson (Sweden)
6 September 2008
20:15 UTC+2

Luxembourg	0–3	Greece
	Report	Torosidis 36'; Gekas 45+1'; Charisteas 76' (pen.)

Stade Josy Barthel, Luxembourg City
Attendance: 4,596
Referee: Anders Hermansen (Denmark)

10 September 2008
20:30 UTC+3

Moldova	1–2	Israel
Picușceac 1'	Report	Golan 39'; Saban 45'

Zimbru Stadium, Chișinău
Attendance: 10,500
Referee: César Muñiz Fernández (Spain)
10 September 2008
21:15 UTC+3

Latvia	0–2	Greece
	Report	Gekas 10', 49'

Skonto Stadions, Riga
Attendance: 8,600
Referee: Tony Chapron (France)
10 September 2008
20:30 UTC+2

Switzerland	1–2	Luxembourg
Nkufo 43'	Report	Strasser 27'; A. Leweck 87'

Letzigrund, Zürich
Attendance: 20,500
Referee: Dejan Filipović (Serbia)

11 October 2008
17:45 UTC+2

Switzerland	2–1	Latvia
Frei 63'; Nkufo 73'	Report	Ivanovs 71'

AFG Arena, St. Gallen
Attendance: 18,026
Referee: Lucílio Batista (Portugal)
11 October 2008
20:15 UTC+2

Luxembourg	1–3	Israel
Peters 14'	Report	Benayoun 2' (pen.); Golan 54'; Tuama 81'

Stade Josy Barthel, Luxembourg City
Attendance: 3,562
Referee: Igor Egorov (Russia)
11 October 2008
21:30 UTC+3

Greece	3–0	Moldova
Charisteas 31', 51'; Katsouranis 40'	Report

Karaiskakis Stadium, Athens
Attendance: 13,684
Referee: Espen Berntsen (Norway)

15 October 2008
19:00 UTC+3

Latvia	1–1	Israel
Koļesņičenko 89'	Report	Benayoun 50'

Skonto Stadions, Riga
Attendance: 7,100
Referee: Vladimír Hriňák (Slovakia)
15 October 2008
20:15 UTC+2

Luxembourg	0–0	Moldova
	Report

Stade Josy Barthel, Luxembourg City
Attendance: 2,157
Referee: Marcin Borski (Poland)
15 October 2008
21:30 UTC+3

Greece	1–2	Switzerland
Charisteas 68'	Report	Frei 42' (pen.); Nkufo 77'

Karaiskakis Stadium, Athens
Attendance: 28,810
Referee: Luis Medina Cantalejo (Spain)

28 March 2009
17:00 UTC+1

Luxembourg	0–4	Latvia
	Report	Karlsons 25'; Cauņa 48'; Višņakovs 71'; Perepļotkins 86'

Stade Josy Barthel, Luxembourg City
Attendance: 2,516
Referee: Mark Whitby (Wales)
28 March 2009
18:45 UTC+2

Moldova	0–2	Switzerland
	Report	Frei 32'; Fernandes 90+3'

Zimbru Stadium, Chișinău
Attendance: 10,500
Referee: Dougie McDonald (Scotland)
28 March 2009
21:00 UTC+2

Israel	1–1	Greece
Golan 55'	Report	Gekas 42'

Ramat Gan Stadium, Ramat Gan
Attendance: 38,000
Referee: Roberto Rosetti (Italy)

1 April 2009
18:30 UTC+3

Latvia	2–0	Luxembourg
Žigajevs 44'; Verpakovskis 76'	Report

Skonto Stadions, Riga
Attendance: 6,700
Referee: Fırat Aydınus (Turkey)
1 April 2009
21:30 UTC+3

Greece	2–1	Israel
Salpingidis 32'; Samaras 67' (pen.)	Report	Barda 60'

Pankritio Stadium, Heraklion
Attendance: 22,794
Referee: Olegário Benquerença (Portugal)
1 April 2009
20:30 UTC+2

Switzerland	2–0	Moldova
Nkufo 20'; Frei 52'	Report

Stade de Genève, Geneva
Attendance: 20,100
Referee: Gianluca Rocchi (Italy)

5 September 2009
19:00 UTC+3

Moldova	0–0	Luxembourg
	Report

Zimbru Stadium, Chișinău
Attendance: 7,820
Referee: Gediminas Mažeika (Lithuania)
5 September 2009
21:00 UTC+3

Israel	0–1	Latvia
	Report	Gorkšs 59'

Ramat Gan Stadium, Ramat Gan
Attendance: 20,000
Referee: Knut Kircher (Germany)
5 September 2009
20:30 UTC+2

Switzerland	2–0	Greece
Grichting 84'; Padalino 87'	Report

St. Jakob-Park, Basel
Attendance: 38,500
Referee: Frank De Bleeckere (Belgium)

9 September 2009
21:00 UTC+3

Israel	7–0	Luxembourg
Barda 9', 21', 43'; Baruchyan 15'; Golan 58'; Sahar 62', 84'	Report

Ramat Gan Stadium, Ramat Gan
Attendance: 7,038
Referee: Michael Svendsen (Denmark)
9 September 2009
21:30 UTC+3

Latvia	2–2	Switzerland
Cauņa 62'; Astafjevs 75'	Report	Frei 43'; Derdiyok 80'

Skonto Stadions, Riga
Attendance: 8,600
Referee: Pavel Královec (Czech Republic)
9 September 2009
21:30 UTC+3

Moldova	1–1	Greece
Andronic 90'	Report	Gekas 33'

Zimbru Stadium, Chișinău
Attendance: 9,870
Referee: Daniel Stålhammar (Sweden)

10 October 2009
17:45 UTC+2

Luxembourg	0–3	Switzerland
	Report	Senderos 6', 8'; Huggel 22'

Stade Josy Barthel, Luxembourg City
Attendance: 8,031
Referee: Eduardo Iturralde González (Spain)
10 October 2009
21:00 UTC+2

Israel	3–1	Moldova
Barda 22', 70'; Ben Dayan 65'	Report	Calincov 90+2'

Ramat Gan Stadium, Ramat Gan
Attendance: 8,700
Referee: Kevin Blom (Netherlands)
10 October 2009
21:30 UTC+3

Greece	5–2	Latvia
Gekas 4', 47' (pen.), 57', 90+1'; Samaras 73'	Report	Verpakovskis 12', 40'

Olympic Stadium, Athens
Attendance: 18,981
Referee: Tom Henning Øvrebø (Norway)

14 October 2009
21:00 UTC+3

Greece	2–1	Luxembourg
Torosidis 30'; Gekas 33'	Report	Papadopoulos 90' (o.g.)

Olympic Stadium, Athens
Attendance: 13,932
Referee: Darko Čeferin (Slovenia)
14 October 2009
21:00 UTC+3

Latvia	3–2	Moldova
Rubins 32', 44'; Grebis 76'	Report	Ovseannicov 25'; Sofroni 90'

Skonto Stadions, Riga
Attendance: 3,800
Referee: Jouni Hyytiä (Finland)
14 October 2009
20:00 UTC+2

Switzerland	0–0	Israel
	Report

St. Jakob-Park, Basel
Attendance: 38,500
Referee: Alexandru Tudor (Romania)

== Goalscorers ==
There were 86 goals scored in 30 matches, for an average of 2.87 goals per match.

10 goals

- (Greece) Theofanis Gekas

6 goals

- (Israel) Elyaniv Barda

5 goals

- (Switzerland) Alexander Frei
- (Switzerland) Blaise Nkufo

4 goals

- (Greece) Angelos Charisteas
- (Israel) Omer Golan

3 goals

- (Israel) Yossi Benayoun
- (Israel) Ben Sahar
- (Latvia) Māris Verpakovskis

2 goals

- (Greece) Georgios Samaras
- (Greece) Vasilis Torosidis
- (Latvia) Vitālijs Astafjevs
- (Latvia) Aleksandrs Cauņa
- (Latvia) Ģirts Karlsons
- (Latvia) Andrejs Rubins
- (Switzerland) Philippe Senderos

1 goal

- (Greece) Kostas Katsouranis
- (Greece) Dimitris Salpingidis
- (Israel) Aviram Baruchyan
- (Israel) David Ben Dayan
- (Israel) Klemi Saban
- (Israel) Salim Tuama
- (Latvia) Kaspars Gorkšs
- (Latvia) Kristaps Grebis
- (Latvia) Deniss Ivanovs
- (Latvia) Vladimirs Koļesņičenko
- (Latvia) Andrejs Perepļotkins
- (Latvia) Aleksejs Višņakovs
- (Latvia) Jurijs Žigajevs
- (Luxembourg) Fons Leweck
- (Luxembourg) René Peters
- (Luxembourg) Jeff Strasser
- (Moldova) Serghei Alexeev
- (Moldova) Valeriu Andronic
- (Moldova) Denis Calincov
- (Moldova) Gheorghe Ovseannicov
- (Moldova) Igor Picușceac
- (Moldova) Veaceslav Sofroni
- (Switzerland) Eren Derdiyok
- (Switzerland) Gelson Fernandes
- (Switzerland) Stéphane Grichting
- (Switzerland) Benjamin Huggel
- (Switzerland) Marco Padalino
- (Switzerland) Hakan Yakin

1 own goal

- (Greece) Avraam Papadopoulos (against Luxembourg)

== Attendances ==
Team	Highest	Lowest	Average
Greece	28,810	13,684	19,640
Israel	38,000	7,038	20,668
Latvia	8,600	3,600	6,960
Luxembourg	8,031	2,157	4,172
Moldova	10,500	4,300	8,598
Switzerland	38,500	18,026	27,125
