= Zlatko Dedić =

Slovenian footballer (born 1984)

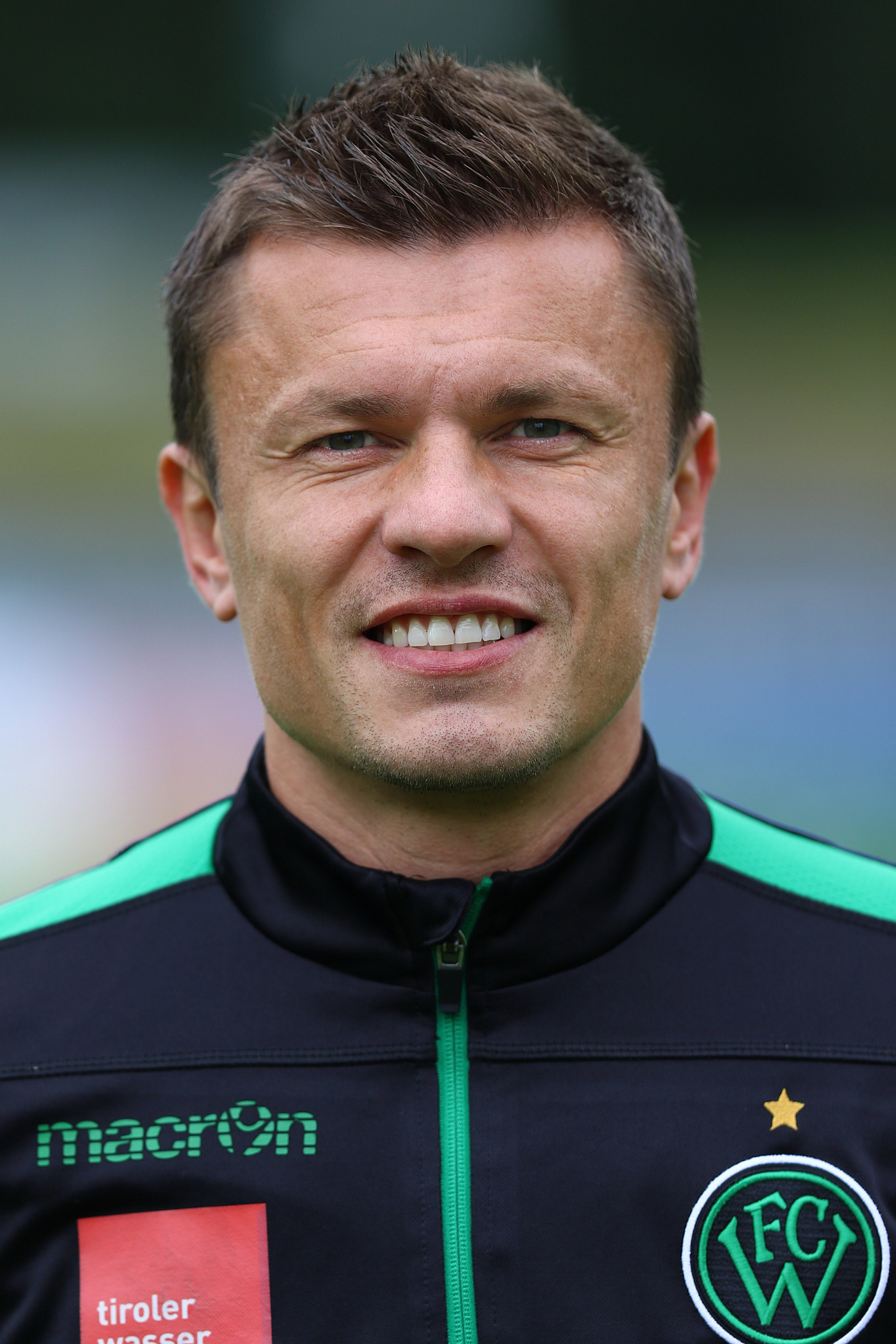
- Dedić in 2018

Personal information
- Date of birth: 5 October 1984 (age 42)
- Place of birth: Bihać, SR Bosnia and Herzegovina, SFR Yugoslavia
- Height: 1.83 m (6 ft 0 in)
- Position: Forward

Youth career
- –2001: Koper

Senior career*
Years	Team	Apps	(Gls)
2000–2001	Koper	3	(0)
2001–2007	Parma	16	(0)
2004–2005	→ Empoli (loan)	10	(0)
2006	→ Cremonese (loan)	18	(5)
2007–2009	Frosinone	63	(13)
2008	→ Piacenza (loan)	22	(10)
2009–2011	VfL Bochum	49	(8)
2011–2012	→ Dynamo Dresden (loan)	27	(13)
2012–2013	VfL Bochum	30	(8)
2013–2014	Dynamo Dresden	32	(6)
2014–2016	FSV Frankfurt	57	(11)
2016–2017	SC Paderborn	31	(7)
2017–2019	Wacker Innsbruck	63	(28)
2019–2021	WSG Tirol	55	(17)
Total		476	(126)

International career
2001	Slovenia U17	4	(5)
2001	Slovenia U18	8	(2)
2001	Slovenia U19	1	(0)
2003–2004	Slovenia U20	5	(4)
2002–2005	Slovenia U21	12	(5)
2004–2013	Slovenia	49	(8)
- * Club domestic league appearances and goals

Zlatko Dedić (born 5 October 1984) is a Slovenian retired footballer who played as a forward. Besides Slovenia, he has played in Italy, Germany, and Austria.

== Club career ==
Dedić started his football career with Koper. In 2001 he transferred to Parma, which loaned him out to Serie B clubs Empoli in the 2004–05 season and Cremonese in the second half of the 2005–06 season. He made his Serie A debut for Parma on 21 September 2005 against Roma.

Dedić joined Frosinone of Serie B in January 2007, signing a contract until June 2011. In January 2008, he was loaned to Piacenza of Serie B and was given the number 9 shirt from Daniele Cacia, who had left for Fiorentina.

After eight years in Italy, Dedić left Frosinone in July 2009 and signed with German club VfL Bochum on a contract until June 2012. In August 2011 he was loaned for one year to Dynamo Dresden.

== International career ==
Dedić made his debut for Slovenia on 18 August 2004 in a friendly match against Serbia and Montenegro, coming in as a substitute in the 67th minute. He scored his first goal against Poland on 6 September 2008, in a 2010 FIFA World Cup qualification match. Dedić was later instrumental in the national team's successful qualification to the 2010 FIFA World Cup by scoring the winning goal in the second leg of the play-off match against Russia, which ended 1–0. He has also been part of Slovenia's national youth teams, from the under-17 to under-21 sides.

== Personal life ==
Dedić was born in Bihać, present-day Bosnia and Herzegovina, and moved to Slovenia at a very young age where he spent his childhood in the village of Podgorje, near Koper, in the Slovenian Littoral.

== Career statistics ==
=== Club ===
As of 25 October 2013

Appearances and goals by club, season and competition
Club	Season	League			National cup		Continental		Total	
Club	Season	Division	Apps	Goals	Apps	Goals	Apps	Goals	Apps	Goals
Koper	2000–01	PrvaLiga	3	0	0	0	—		3	0
Parma	2001–02	Serie A	0	0			0	0	0	0
Parma	2002–03	Serie A	0	0			0	0	0	0
Parma	2003–04	Serie A	0	0			0	0	0	0
Empoli	2004–05	Serie B	10	0			—		10	0
Parma	2005–06	Serie A	10	0	5	2	—		15	2
Cremonese	2005–06	Serie B	18	5			—		18	5
Parma	2006–07	Serie A	6	0	4	3	4	1	14	4
Frosinone Calcio	2006–07	Serie B	16	2			—		16	2
Frosinone Calcio	2007–08	Serie B	16	4			—		16	4
Piacenza Calcio	2007–08	Serie B	22	10			—		22	10
Frosinone Calcio	2008–09	Serie B	31	7			—		31	7
VfL Bochum	2009–10	Bundesliga	27	5	2	0	—		29	5
VfL Bochum	2010–11	2. Bundesliga	22	3	0	0	—		22	3
Dynamo Dresden	2011–12	2. Bundesliga	27	13	1	0	—		28	13
VfL Bochum	2012–13	2. Bundesliga	30	8	2	3	—		32	11
Dynamo Dresden	2013–14	2. Bundesliga	10	1	—		—		10	1
Career total			248	58	14	8	4	1	266	67

=== International ===
Scores and results list Slovenia's goal tally first, score column indicates score after each Dedić goal.

List of international goals scored by Zlatko Dedić
No.	Date	Venue	Opponent	Score	Result	Competition
1	6 September 2008	Stadion Oporowska, Wrocław, Poland	Poland	1–1	1–1	FIFA World Cup 2010 qualification
2	9 September 2009	Ljudski vrt, Maribor, Slovenia	Poland	1–0	3–0	FIFA World Cup 2010 qualification
3	18 November 2009	Ljudski vrt, Maribor, Slovenia	Russia	1–0	1–0	FIFA World Cup 2010 qualification
4	11 August 2010	Stožice Stadium, Ljubljana, Slovenia	Australia	1–0	2–0	Friendly match
5	8 October 2010	Stožice Stadium, Ljubljana, Slovenia	Faroe Islands	5–0	5–1	UEFA Euro 2012 qualification
6	9 February 2011	Qemal Stafa Stadium, Tirana, Albania	Albania	2–1	2–1	Friendly match
7	15 August 2012	Stožice Stadium, Ljubljana, Slovenia	Romania	2–0	4–3	Friendly match
8	15 August 2012	Stožice Stadium, Ljubljana, Slovenia	Romania	3–1	4–3	Friendly match
