= 2010 FIFA World Cup qualification – UEFA Group 3 =

The 2010 FIFA World Cup qualification UEFA Group 3 was a UEFA qualifying group for the 2010 FIFA World Cup. The group comprised the Czech Republic, Poland, Northern Ireland, Slovakia, Slovenia and San Marino.

The group was won by Slovakia, who qualified for the 2010 FIFA World Cup. The runners-up Slovenia entered the UEFA play-off stage.

== Standings ==
Pos	Team	Pld	W	D	L	GF	GA	GD	Pts	Qualification	(Slovakia)	(Slovenia)	(Czech Republic)	(Northern Ireland)	(Poland)	(San Marino)
1	Slovakia	10	7	1	2	22	10	+12	22	Qualification to 2010 FIFA World Cup	—	0–2	2–2	2–1	2–1	7–0
2	Slovenia	10	6	2	2	18	4	+14	20	Advance to second round	2–1	—	0–0	2–0	3–0	5–0
3	Czech Republic	10	4	4	2	17	6	+11	16		1–2	1–0	—	0–0	2–0	7–0
4	Northern Ireland	10	4	3	3	13	9	+4	15		0–2	1–0	0–0	—	3–2	4–0
5	Poland	10	3	2	5	19	14	+5	11		0–1	1–1	2–1	1–1	—	10–0
6	San Marino	10	0	0	10	1	47	−46	0		1–3	0–3	0–3	0–3	0–2	—

== Matches ==
The match schedule was determined at a meeting in Bratislava, Slovakia on 16 January 2008. The August 2009 date in the international match calendar was moved forward by one week, from 19 August to 12 August 2009, at the FIFA Executive Committee meeting on 27 May 2008.

6 September 2008
17:00 UTC+2

Poland	1–1	Slovenia
Żewłakow 17' (pen.)	Report	Dedić 35'

Stadion Oporowska, Wrocław
Attendance: 7,300
Referee: Kristinn Jakobsson (Iceland)
6 September 2008
17:30 UTC+2

Slovakia	2–1	Northern Ireland
Škrtel 47'; Hamšík 70'	Report	Ďurica 81' (o.g.)

Tehelné pole, Bratislava
Attendance: 5,445
Referee: Nikolai Ivanov (Russia)

10 September 2008
20:30 UTC+2

San Marino	0–2	Poland
	Report	Smolarek 36'; R. Lewandowski 66'

Stadio Olimpico, Serravalle
Attendance: 2,374
Referee: Christoforos Zografos (Greece)
10 September 2008
19:45 UTC+1

Northern Ireland	0–0	Czech Republic
	Report

Windsor Park, Belfast
Attendance: 12,882
Referee: Ivan Bebek (Croatia)
10 September 2008
20:45 UTC+2

Slovenia	2–1	Slovakia
Novaković 22', 81'	Report	Jakubko 83'

Ljudski vrt, Maribor
Attendance: 9,900
Referee: Svein Oddvar Moen (Norway)

11 October 2008
20:30 UTC+2

Poland	2–1	Czech Republic
Brożek 27'; Błaszczykowski 53'	Report	Fenin 87'

Stadion Śląski, Chorzów
Attendance: 38,293
Referee: Wolfgang Stark (Germany)
11 October 2008
20:30 UTC+2

San Marino	1–3	Slovakia
Selva 45'	Report	Šesták 33'; Kozák 39'; Karhan 51'

Stadio Olimpico, Serravalle
Attendance: 1,037
Referee: Sascha Kever (Switzerland)
11 October 2008
20:45 UTC+2

Slovenia	2–0	Northern Ireland
Novaković 83'; Ljubijankić 84'	Report

Ljudski vrt, Maribor
Attendance: 12,385
Referee: Eduardo Iturralde González (Spain)

15 October 2008
17:30 UTC+2

Czech Republic	1–0	Slovenia
Sionko 62'	Report

Na Stínadlech, Teplice
Attendance: 15,220
Referee: Martin Atkinson (England)
15 October 2008
20:30 UTC+2

Slovakia	2–1	Poland
Šesták 84', 86'	Report	Smolarek 70'

Tehelné pole, Bratislava
Attendance: 17,650
Referee: Bertrand Layec (France)
15 October 2008
19:45 UTC+1

Northern Ireland	4–0	San Marino
Healy 31'; McCann 43'; Lafferty 56'; Davis 75'	Report

Windsor Park, Belfast
Attendance: 12,957
Referee: Petteri Kari (Finland)

19 November 2008
20:30 UTC+1

San Marino	0–3	Czech Republic
	Report	Kováč 47'; Pospěch 53'; Necid 66'

Stadio Olimpico, Serravalle
Attendance: 1,318
Referee: Hannes Kaasik (Estonia)

11 February 2009
20:30 UTC+1

San Marino	0–3	Northern Ireland
	Report	McAuley 7'; McCann 33'; Brunt 63'

Stadio Olimpico, Serravalle
Attendance: 1,942
Referee: Dragomir Stanković (Serbia)

28 March 2009
17:15 UTC+0

Northern Ireland	3–2	Poland
Feeney 10'; Evans 47'; Żewłakow 62' (o.g.)	Report	Jeleń 27'; Saganowski 90+1'

Windsor Park, Belfast
Attendance: 13,357
Referee: Martin Hansson (Sweden)
28 March 2009
20:45 UTC+1

Slovenia	0–0	Czech Republic
	Report

Ljudski vrt, Maribor
Attendance: 12,500
Referee: Pedro Proença (Portugal)

1 April 2009
20:30 UTC+2

Czech Republic	1–2	Slovakia
Jankulovski 30'	Report	Šesták 22'; Jendrišek 82'

AXA Arena, Prague
Attendance: 14,956
Referee: Alberto Undiano Mallenco (Spain)
1 April 2009
20:30 UTC+2

Poland	10–0	San Marino
Boguski 1', 27'; Smolarek 18', 60', 72', 81'; R. Lewandowski 43'; Jeleń 51'; M. Lewandowski 63'; Saganowski 88'	Report

Arena Kielc, Kielce
Attendance: 15,200
Referee: Aleksei Kulbakov (Belarus)
1 April 2009
19:45 UTC+1

Northern Ireland	1–0	Slovenia
Feeney 73'	Report

Windsor Park, Belfast
Attendance: 13,243
Referee: Alon Yefet (Israel)

6 June 2009
17:30 UTC+2

Slovakia	7–0	San Marino
Čech 3', 32'; Pekarík 12'; Stoch 35'; Kozák 42'; Jakubko 63'; Hanzel 68'	Report

Tehelné pole, Bratislava
Attendance: 6,652
Referee: Jerome Efong Nzolo (Belgium)

12 August 2009
20:45 UTC+3

Slovenia	5–0	San Marino
Koren 19', 74'; Radosavljević 39'; Kirm 54'; Ljubijankić 90+3'	Report

Ljudski vrt, Maribor
Attendance: 4,400
Referee: Dimitar Meckarovski (Macedonia)

5 September 2009
20:30 UTC+2

Poland	1–1	Northern Ireland
M. Lewandowski 80'	Report	Lafferty 38'

Stadion Śląski, Chorzów
Attendance: 38,914
Referee: Manuel Mejuto González (Spain)
5 September 2009
20:30 UTC+2

Slovakia	2–2	Czech Republic
Šesták 59'; Hamšík 73' (pen.)	Report	Pudil 68'; Baroš 83'

Tehelné pole, Bratislava
Attendance: 23,800
Referee: Tom Henning Øvrebø (Norway)

9 September 2009
17:20 UTC+2

Czech Republic	7–0	San Marino
Baroš 28', 44', 45+3' (pen.), 66'; Svěrkoš 47', 90+4'; Necid 86'	Report

Městský fotbalový stadion, Uherské Hradiště
Attendance: 8,121
Referee: Arman Amirkhanyan (Armenia)
9 September 2009
19:45 UTC+1

Northern Ireland	0–2	Slovakia
	Report	Šesták 15'; Hološko 67'

Windsor Park, Belfast
Attendance: 13,019
Referee: Björn Kuipers (Netherlands)
9 September 2009
20:45 UTC+2

Slovenia	3–0	Poland
Dedić 13'; Novaković 44'; Birsa 62'	Report

Ljudski vrt, Maribor
Attendance: 10,226
Referee: William Collum (Scotland)

10 October 2009
20:30 UTC+2

Czech Republic	2–0	Poland
Necid 51'; Plašil 72'	Report

Generali Arena, Prague
Attendance: 14,010
Referee: Claus Bo Larsen (Denmark)
10 October 2009
20:30 UTC+2

Slovakia	0–2	Slovenia
	Report	Birsa 56'; Pečnik 90+3'

Tehelné pole, Bratislava
Attendance: 23,800
Referee: Wolfgang Stark (Germany)

14 October 2009
20:30 UTC+2

Czech Republic	0–0	Northern Ireland
	Report

Synot Tip Arena, Prague
Attendance: 8,002
Referee: Laurent Duhamel (France)
14 October 2009
20:30 UTC+2

Poland	0–1	Slovakia
	Report	Gancarczyk 3' (o.g.)

Stadion Śląski, Chorzów
Attendance: 5,000
Referee: Jonas Eriksson (Sweden)
14 October 2009
20:30 UTC+2

San Marino	0–3	Slovenia
	Report	Novaković 24'; Stevanović 68'; Šuler 81'

Stadio Olimpico, Serravalle
Attendance: 1,745
Referee: Zsolt Szabó (Hungary)

== Goalscorers ==
There were 90 goals scored in 30 matches, for an average of 3 goals per match.

6 goals

- (Poland) Ebi Smolarek
- (Slovakia) Stanislav Šesták

5 goals

- (Czech Republic) Milan Baroš
- (Slovenia) Milivoje Novakovič

3 goals

- (Czech Republic) Tomáš Necid

2 goals

- (Czech Republic) Václav Svěrkoš
- (Northern Ireland) Warren Feeney
- (Northern Ireland) Kyle Lafferty
- (Northern Ireland) Grant McCann
- (Poland) Rafał Boguski
- (Poland) Ireneusz Jeleń
- (Poland) Mariusz Lewandowski
- (Poland) Robert Lewandowski
- (Poland) Marek Saganowski
- (Slovakia) Marek Čech
- (Slovakia) Marek Hamšík
- (Slovakia) Martin Jakubko
- (Slovakia) Ján Kozák
- (Slovenia) Valter Birsa
- (Slovenia) Zlatko Dedič
- (Slovenia) Robert Koren
- (Slovenia) Zlatan Ljubijankič

1 goal

- (Czech Republic) Martin Fenin
- (Czech Republic) Marek Jankulovski
- (Czech Republic) Radoslav Kováč
- (Czech Republic) Jaroslav Plašil
- (Czech Republic) Zdeněk Pospěch
- (Czech Republic) Daniel Pudil
- (Czech Republic) Libor Sionko
- (Northern Ireland) Chris Brunt
- (Northern Ireland) Steven Davis
- (Northern Ireland) Jonny Evans
- (Northern Ireland) David Healy
- (Northern Ireland) Gareth McAuley
- (Poland) Paweł Brożek
- (Poland) Jakub Błaszczykowski
- (Poland) Michał Żewłakow
- (San Marino) Andy Selva
- (Slovakia) Ľuboš Hanzel
- (Slovakia) Filip Hološko
- (Slovakia) Erik Jendrišek
- (Slovakia) Miroslav Karhan
- (Slovakia) Peter Pekarík
- (Slovakia) Miroslav Stoch
- (Slovakia) Martin Škrtel
- (Slovenia) Andraž Kirm
- (Slovenia) Dalibor Stevanovič
- (Slovenia) Marko Šuler
- (Slovenia) Nejc Pečnik
- (Slovenia) Aleksandar Radosavljević

1 own goal

- (Poland) Seweryn Gancarczyk (against Slovakia)
- (Poland) Michał Żewłakow (against Northern Ireland)
- (Slovakia) Ján Ďurica (against Northern Ireland)

== Attendances ==
Team	Highest	Lowest	Average
Czech Republic	15,220	8,002	12,062
Northern Ireland	13,357	12,882	13,092
Poland	38,914	4,500	20,841
San Marino	2,374	1,037	1,683
Slovakia	23,800	6,652	15,469
Slovenia	12,500	4,400	9,882
