= Denmark national football team results (2000–2009) =

This is a list of Association football games played by the Denmark national football team between 2000 and 2009. During the 2000s, the Danish national team played 109 games, winning 54, drawing 30, and losing 25. In these games, they scored 171 goals, while conceding 98 to their opponents. The first game of the 2000s was the March 29, 2000 game against Portugal, the 639th overall Danish national team game. The last game of the 2000s was the November 18, 2009 game against United States, the 747th game of the Danish national team.

== Results ==
Key
Win
Draw
Defeat

=== 2000 ===
29 March Friendly	Portugal	2–1	Denmark	Leiria, Portugal
21:00 UTC+1	Costa 40' (pen.); Figo 50'	Report	Tomasson 4'	Stadium: Estádio Municipal de Leiria; Attendance: 12,000; Referee: John McDermott (Republic of Ireland)

26 April Friendly	Denmark	0–1	Sweden	Copenhagen, Denmark
19:15 UTC+2		Report	Pettersson 38'	Stadium: Parken Stadium; Attendance: 28,491; Referee: Alain Hamer (Luxembourg)

3 June Friendly	Denmark	2–2	Belgium	Copenhagen, Denmark
19:15 UTC+2	Tomasson 33'; Schmeichel 61' (pen.)	Report	Staelens 51' (pen.); Wilmots 73'	Stadium: Parken Stadium; Attendance: 26,993; Referee: Hellmut Krug (Germany)

11 June Euro 2000 Group D	France	3–0	Denmark	Bruges, Belgium
18:00 UTC+2	Blanc 16'; Henry 64'; Wiltord 90'	Report		Stadium: Jan Breydel Stadium; Attendance: 28,100; Referee: Günter Benkö (Austria)

16 June Euro 2000 Group D	Denmark	0–3	Netherlands	Rotterdam, Netherlands
20:45 UTC+2		Report	Kluivert 57'; de Boer 66'; Zenden 77'	Stadium: De Kuip; Attendance: 48,200; Referee: Urs Meier (Switzerland)

21 June Euro 2000 Group D	Denmark	0–2	Czech Republic	Liège, Belgium
20:45 UTC+2		Report	Šmicer 64', 67'	Stadium: Stade Maurice Dufrasne; Attendance: 20,000; Referee: Gamal El Ghandour (Egypt)

16 August Nordic Football Championship	Faroe Islands	0–2	Denmark	Tórshavn, Faroe Islands
17:45 UTC+1		Report	Sand 55'; Steen Nielsen 59'	Stadium: Tórsvøllur; Attendance: 6,478; Referee: Jon E. Skjervold (Norway)

2 September 2002 World Cup qualification	Iceland	1–2	Denmark	Reykjavík, Iceland
18:00 UTC+0	Sverrisson 10'	Report	Tomasson 26'; Bisgaard 49'	Stadium: Langardalsvöllur; Attendance: 7,017; Referee: Stephan Bre (France)

7 October 2002 World Cup qualification	Northern Ireland	1–1	Denmark	Belfast, Northern Ireland
15:00 UTC+1	Healy 37'	Report	Rommedahl 59'	Stadium: Windsor Park; Attendance: 11,823; Referee: Vitor Manuel Melo Pereira (Portugal)

11 October 2002 World Cup qualification	Denmark	1–1	Bulgaria	Copenhagen, Denmark
19:15 UTC+1	Sand 72'	Report	Berbatov 82'	Stadium: Parken Stadium; Attendance: 39,847; Referee: Oguz Sarvan (Turkey)

15 November Friendly	Denmark	2–1	Germany	Copenhagen, Denmark
19:15 UTC+1	Rommedahl 56', 66'	Report	Scholl 84'	Stadium: Parken Stadium; Attendance: 17,664; Referee: Fritz Stuchlik (Austria)

=== 2001 ===
24 March 2002 World Cup qualification	Malta	0–5	Denmark	Ta' Qali, Malta
20:00 UTC+1	https://eu-football.info/_match.php?id=25274		Sand 8', 64', 79'; Heintze 50'; Jensen 76'	Stadium: Ta' Qali National Stadium; Attendance: 784; Referee: Mike McCurry (Scotland)

28 March 2002 World Cup qualification	Czech Republic	0–0	Denmark	Prague, Czech Republic
20:30 UTC+2		Report		Stadium: Stadion Letná; Attendance: 16,354; Referee: Graham Barber (England)

25 April Friendly	Denmark	3–0	Slovenia	Copenhagen, Denmark
19:15 UTC+2 (Note: The game was delayed until 18 minutes past the hour, due to it being Peter Schmeichel's final appearance for the national team.)	Grønkjær 61'; Tomasson 69' (pen.); Sand 82'	Report		Stadium: Parken Stadium; Attendance: 32,526; Referee: Kari Petteri (Finland)

2 June 2002 World Cup qualification	Denmark	2–1	Czech Republic	Copenhagen, Denmark
19:15 UTC+2	Sand 6'; Tomasson 83'	Report	Tyce 41'	Stadium: Parken Stadium; Attendance: 41,669; Referee: Markus Merk (Germany)

6 June 2002 World Cup qualification	Denmark	2–1	Malta	Copenhagen, Denmark
19:15 UTC+2	Sand 44', 84'	Report	Mallia 8'	Stadium: Parken Stadium; Attendance: 38,499; Referee: Serguey Shmolik (Belarus)

15 August Friendly	France	1–0	Denmark	Nantes, France
20:45 UTC+2	Pires 13'	Report		Stadium: Stade de la Beaujoire; Attendance: 36,548; Referee: Mike McCurry (Scotland)

1 September 2002 World Cup qualification	Denmark	1–1	Northern Ireland	Copenhagen, Denmark
19:15 UTC+2	Rommedahl 3'	Report	Mulryne 73'	Stadium: Parken Stadium; Attendance: 41,569; Referee: Ryszard Wojcik (Poland)

5 September 2002 World Cup qualification	Bulgaria	0–2	Denmark	Sofia, Bulgaria
21:00 UTC+3		Report	Tomasson 47', 90+1'	Stadium: Stadion Balgarska Armia; Attendance: 21,500; Referee: Jan Wegereef (Netherlands)

6 October 2002 World Cup qualification	Denmark	6–0	Iceland	Copenhagen, Denmark
20:15 UTC+2	Rommedahl 13'; Sand 15', 67'; Gravesen 31', 36'; Michaelsen 90'	Report		Stadium: Parken Stadium; Attendance: 41,769; Referee: Arturo Daudén Ibáñez (Spain)

10 November Friendly	Denmark	1–1	Netherlands	Copenhagen, Denmark
19:15 UTC+1	Jørgensen 84' (pen.)	Report	Hasselbaink 45' (pen.)	Stadium: Parken Stadium; Attendance: 20,354; Referee: Stuart Dougal (Scotland)

=== 2002 ===
13 February Friendly	Saudi Arabia	0–1	Denmark	Riyadh, Saudi Arabia
20:30 UTC+3		Report	Sand 17'	Stadium: King Fayad Stadium; Attendance: 7,000; Referee: Qasim Hamza Shaaban (Kuwait)

27 March Friendly	Republic of Ireland	3–0	Denmark	Dublin, Republic of Ireland
19:15 UTC+0	Harte 19'; Keane 54'; Morrison 90'	Report		Stadium: Lansdowne Road; Attendance: 42,000; Referee: Brian Lawlor (Wales)

17 April Friendly	Denmark	3–1	Israel	Copenhagen, Denmark
19:25 UTC+2 (Note: The game was delayed for 10 minutes due to increased security measures.)	Heintze 4'; Tomasson 14'; Rommedahl 34'	Report	Nimni 90' (pen.)	Stadium: Parken Stadium; Attendance: 9,598; Referee: Jack van Hulten (Netherlands)

17 May Friendly	Denmark	2–1	Cameroon	Copenhagen, Denmark
19:15 UTC+2	Mettomo 21' (o.g.); Tomasson 59' (pen.)	Report	Mbami 74'	Stadium: Parken Stadium; Attendance: 34,571; Referee: Rune Pedersen (Norway)

26 May Friendly	Denmark	2–1	Tunisia	Wakayama, Japan
16:00 UTC+9	Grønkjær 17'; Sand 67'	Report	Jaziri 62'	Stadium: Kimiidera Park; Attendance: 19,800; Referee: Toshimitsu Yoshida (Japan)

1 June 2002 World Cup Group A	Uruguay	1–2	Denmark	Ulsan, South Korea
18:00 UTC+9	Rodriguez 47'	Report	Tomasson 45', 83'	Stadium: Ulsan Munsu Football Stadium; Attendance: 30,157; Referee: Saad Kamel Mane (Kuwait)

6 June 2002 World Cup Group A	Denmark	1–1	Senegal	Daegu, South Korea
15:30 UTC+9	Tomasson 16' (pen.)	Report	Diao 52'	Stadium: Daegu Stadium; Attendance: 43,500; Referee: Carlos Batres (Guatemala)

11 June 2002 World Cup Group A	Denmark	2–0	France	Incheon, South Korea
15:30 UTC+9	Rommedahl 22'; Tomasson 66'	Report		Stadium: Incheon Munhak Stadium; Attendance: 48,100; Referee: Vitor Manuel Melo Pereira (Portugal)

15 June 2002 World Cup R16	Denmark	0–3	England	Niigata, Japan
20:00 UTC+1		Report	Ferdinand 5'; Owen 22'; Heskey 44'	Stadium: Denka Big Swan Stadium; Attendance: 40,582; Referee: Markus Merk (Germany)

21 August Friendly	Scotland	0–1	Denmark	Glasgow, Scotland
20:00 UTC+1		Report	Sand 9'	Stadium: Hampden Park; Attendance: 28,766; Referee: Leslie Irvine (Northern Ireland)

7 September Euro 2004 qualifying	Norway	2–2	Denmark	Oslo, Norway
16:00 UTC+1	Riise 54'; Carew 90'	Report	Tomasson 23', 71'	Stadium: Ullevaal Stadion; Attendance: 25,114; Referee: Hugh Dallas (Scotland)

12 October Euro 2004 qualifying	Denmark	2–0	Luxembourg	Copenhagen, Denmark
19:15 UTC+2	Tomasson 52' (pen.); Sand 71'	Report		Stadium: Parken Stadium; Attendance: 40,259; Referee: Ferenc Bede (Hungary)

20 November Friendly	Denmark	2–0	Poland	Copenhagen, Denmark
19:15 UTC+1	Tomasson 22'; Røll 72'	Report		Stadium: Parken Stadium; Attendance: 15,364; Referee: Ruud Boosen (Netherlands)

=== 2003 ===
12 February Friendly	Egypt	1–4	Denmark	Cairo, Egypt
20:00 UTC+2	Hassan 20'	Report	C. Jensen 31', 68', 70'; Tomasson 59'	Stadium: Cairo International Stadium; Attendance: 30,000; Referee: Essam Abdel-Fatah (Egypt)

29 March Euro 2004 qualifying	Romania	2–5	Denmark	Bucharest, Romania
19:00 UTC+2	Mutu 5'; Munteanu 47'	Report	Rommedahl 8', 90+2'; Gravesen 53'; Tomasson 71'; Contra 73' (o.g.)	Stadium: [Stadionul Național; Attendance: 60,000; Referee: Manuel Mejuto González (Spain)

2 April Euro 2004 qualifying	Denmark	0–2	Bosnia and Herzegovina	Copenhagen, Denmark
19:15 UTC+2		Report	Barbarez 23'; Baljić 29'	Stadium: Parken Stadium; Attendance: 30,845; Referee: Anton Stredák (Slovakia)

30 April Friendly	Denmark	1–0	Ukraine	Copenhagen, Denmark
19:15 UTC+2	Gravesen 37'	Report		Stadium: Parken Stadium; Attendance: 14,599; Referee: Tomasz Mikulski (Poland)

7 June Euro 2004 qualifying	Denmark	1–0	Norway	Copenhagen, Denmark
19:15 UTC+2	Grønkjær 5'	Report		Stadium: Parken Stadium; Attendance: 41,824; Referee: Graham Poll (England)

11 June Euro 2004 qualifying	Luxembourg	0–2	Denmark	Luxembourg City, Luxembourg
20:00 UTC+2		Report	C. Jensen 22'; Gravesen 50'	Stadium: Stade Josy Barthel; Attendance: 6,869; Referee: Yuri Baskakov (Russia)

20 August Friendly	Denmark	1–1	Finland	Copenhagen, Denmark
19:15 UTC+2	Grønkjær 42'	Report	Riihilahti 88'	Stadium: Parken Stadium; Attendance: 14,882; Referee: Mike McCurry (Scotland)

10 September Euro 2004 qualifying	Denmark	2–2	Romania	Copenhagen, Denmark
19:15 UTC+2	Tomasson 35' (pen.); Laursen 90+5'	Report	Mutu 62'; Pancu 72'	Stadium: Parken Stadium; Attendance: 42,049; Referee: Urs Meier (Switzerland)

11 October Euro 2004 qualifying	Bosnia and Herzegovina	1–1	Denmark	Sarajevo, Bosnia and Herzegovina
18:00 UTC+2	Bolić 39'	Report	Jørgensen 12'	Stadium: Koševo Stadium; Attendance: 36,000; Referee: Graham Barber (England)

16 November Friendly	England	2–3	Denmark	Manchester, England
16:00 UTC+0	Rooney 5'; J. Cole 9'	Report	Jørgensen 8', 30' (pen.); Tomasson 82'	Stadium: Old Trafford; Attendance: 64,159; Referee: Vladimír Hriňák (Slovakia)

=== 2004 ===
18 February Friendly	Turkey	0–1	Denmark	Adana, Turkey
20:30 UTC+2		Report	Jørgensen 32'	Stadium: 5 Ocak Stadium; Attendance: 21,600; Referee: Franz-Xaver Wack (Germany)

31 March Friendly	Spain	2–0	Denmark	Gijón, Spain
21:45 UTC+2	Morientes 22'; Raúl 60'	Report		Stadium: El Molinón; Attendance: 18,600; Referee: António Manuel Almeida Costa (Portugal)

28 April Friendly	Denmark	1–0	Scotland	Copenhagen, Denmark
20:00 UTC+2	Sand 61'	Report		Stadium: Parken Stadium; Attendance: 22,885; Referee: Martin Ingvarsson (Sweden)

30 May Friendly	Estonia	2–2	Denmark	Tallinn, Estonia
20:00 UTC+3	Viikmäe 77'; Lindpere 90'	Report	Tomasson 28'; Perez 79'	Stadium: A. Le Coq Arena; Attendance: 4,800; Referee: Ruud Bossen (Netherlands)

5 June Friendly	Denmark	1–2	Croatia	Copenhagen, Denmark
17:00 UTC+2	Sand 56'	Report	Šokota 27'; Olić 39'	Stadium: Parken Stadium; Attendance: 30,843; Referee: Fritz Stuchlik (Austria)

14 June Euro 2004 Group C	Denmark	0–0	Italy	Guimarães, Portugal
17:00 UTC+1		Report		Stadium: Estádio D. Afonso Henriques; Attendance: 29,595; Referee: Manuel Mejuto González (Spain)

18 June Euro 2004 Group C	Bulgaria	0–2	Denmark	Braga, Portugal
17:00 UTC+1		Report	Tomasson 44'; Grønkjær 90+2'	Stadium: Estádio Municipal de Braga; Attendance: 24,131; Referee: Lucílio Batista (Portugal)

22 June Euro 2004 Group C	Denmark	2–2	Sweden	Porto, Portugal
19:45 UTC+1	Tomasson 28', 66'	Report	Larsson 47' (pen.); Jonson 89'	Stadium: Estádio do Bessa; Attendance: 26,115; Referee: Markus Merk (Germany)

27 June Euro 2004 QF	Czech Republic	3–0	Denmark	Porto, Portugal
19:45 UTC+1	Koller 49'; Baroš 63', 65'	Report		Stadium: Estádio do Dragão; Attendance: 24,131; Referee: Valentin Ivanov (Russia)

18 August Friendly	Poland	1–5	Denmark	Poznań, Poland
19:00 UTC+2	Żurawski 75'	Report	Madsen 23', 30', 90'; Gaardsøe 51'; Jensen 86'	Stadium: Stadion Miejski; Attendance: 4,500; Referee: Ivan Bebek (Croatia)

4 September 2006 World Cup qualification	Denmark	1–1	Ukraine	Copenhagen, Denmark
20:00 UTC+2	Jørgensen 9'	Report	Husin 56'	Stadium: Parken Stadium; Attendance: 36,335; Referee: Urs Meier (Switzerland)

9 October 2006 World Cup qualification	Albania	0–2	Denmark	Tirana, Albania
20:45 UTC+2		Report	Jørgensen 52'; Tomasson 72'	Stadium: Qemal Stafa; Attendance: 18,500; Referee: Yuri Baskakov (Russia)

13 October 2006 World Cup qualification	Denmark	1–1	Turkey	Copenhagen, Denmark
17:00 UTC+2	Tomasson 27' (pen.)	Report	Nihat 70'	Stadium: Parken Stadium; Attendance: 41,331; Referee: Massimo De Santis (Italy)

17 November 2006 World Cup qualification	Georgia	2–2	Denmark	Tbilisi, Georgia
20:00 UTC+3	Demetradze 33'; Asatiani 76'	Report	Tomasson 7', 64'	Stadium: Mikheil Meskhi Stadium; Attendance: 20,000; Referee: Darko Čeferin (Slovenia)

=== 2005 ===
9 February 2006 World Cup qualification	Greece	2–1	Denmark	Piraeus, Greece
21:30 UTC+3	Zagorakis 25'; Basinas 32' (pen.)	Report	Rommedahl 46'	Stadium: Karaiskakis Stadium; Attendance: 32,430; Referee: Pierluigi Collina (Italy)

26 March 2006 World Cup qualification	Denmark	3–0	Kazakhstan	Copenhagen, Denmark
20:00 UTC+1	Møller 10', 48'; C. Poulsen 33'	Report		Stadium: Parken Stadium; Attendance: 20,980; Referee: Grzegorz Gilewski (Poland)

30 March 2006 World Cup qualification	Ukraine	1–0	Denmark	Kyiv, Ukraine
19:15 UTC+3	Voronin 68'	Report		Stadium: Olimpiyskyi National Sports Complex; Attendance: 60,000; Referee: Ľuboš Micheľ (Slovakia)

2 June Friendly	Finland	0–1	Denmark	Tampere, Finland
20:00 UTC+3		Report	Silberbauer 90'	Stadium: Tampere Stadium; Attendance: 9,238; Referee: Jan Wegereef (Netherlands)

8 June 2006 World Cup qualification	Denmark	3–1	Albania	Copenhagen, Denmark
20:00 UTC+2	Larsen 5', 47'; Jørgensen 55'	Report	Bogdani 73'	Stadium: Parken Stadium; Attendance: 26,366; Referee: Peter Fröjdfeldt (Sweden)

17 August Friendly	Denmark	4–1	England	Copenhagen, Denmark
20:00 UTC+2	Rommedahl 60'; Tomasson 63'; Gravgaard 67'; Larsen 90+2'	Report	Rooney 87'	Stadium: Parken Stadium; Attendance: 41,438; Referee: Tom Henning Øvrebø (Norway)

3 September 2006 World Cup qualification	Turkey	2–2	Denmark	Istanbul, Turkey
21:00 UTC+3	Okan 47'; Tümer 80'	Report	C. Jensen 40'; Larsen 90+3'	Stadium: BJK İnönü Stadium; Attendance: 29,721; Referee: Manuel Mejuto González (Spain)

7 September 2006 World Cup qualification	Denmark	6–1	Georgia	Copenhagen, Denmark
20:00 UTC+2	Jensen 10'; Poulsen 30'; Agger 43'; Tomasson 55'; Larsen 80', 84'	Report	Demetradze 37'	Stadium: Parken Stadium; Attendance: 27,177; Referee: Emil Bozinovski (Macedonia)

8 October 2006 World Cup qualification	Denmark	1–0	Greece	Copenhagen, Denmark
20:00 UTC+2	Gravgaard 40'	Report		Stadium: Parken Stadium; Attendance: 42,099; Referee: Frank De Bleeckere (Belgium)

12 October 2006 World Cup qualification	Kazakhstan	1–2	Denmark	Almaty, Kazakhstan
22:00 UTC+5	Kuchma 86'	Report	Gravgaard 46'; Tomasson 49'	Stadium: Almaty Central Stadium; Attendance: 8,050; Referee: Edo Trivković (Croatia)

=== 2006 ===
1 March Friendly	Israel	0–2	Denmark	Ramat Gan, Israel
19:50 UTC+2		Report	Perez 7'; Skoubo 19'	Stadium: Ramat Gan Stadium; Attendance: 15,762; Referee: Peter Sippel (Germany)

27 May Friendly	Denmark	1–1	Paraguay	Aarhus, Denmark
20:00 UTC+2	Tomasson 51'	Report	Cardozo 20'	Stadium: NRGi Park; Attendance: 20,047; Referee: Steve Bennett (England)

31 May Friendly	France	2–0	Denmark	Lens, France
21:00 UTC+2	Henry 13'; Wiltord 76'	Report		Stadium: Stade Félix Bollaert; Attendance: 39,000; Referee: Alan Kelly (Ireland)

16 August Friendly	Denmark	2–0	Poland	Odense, Denmark
20:00 UTC+2	Bendtner 33'; Rommedahl 63'	Report		Stadium: Fionia Park; Attendance: 11,088; Referee: Tony Asumaa (Finland)

1 September Friendly	Denmark	4–2	Portugal	Brøndby, Denmark
20:00 UTC+2	Tomasson 15'; Kahlenberg 21'; Jørgensen 78'; Bendtner 90'	Report	Carvalho 17'; Nani 66'	Stadium: Brøndby Stadium; Attendance: 13,186; Referee: Alan Kelly (Ireland)

6 September Euro 2008 qualifying	Iceland	0–2	Denmark	Reykjavík, Iceland
18:05 UTC+0		Report	Rommedahl 5'; Tomasson 33'	Stadium: Laugardalsvöllur; Attendance: 10,007; Referee: Nikolai Ivanov (Russia)

7 October Euro 2008 qualifying	Denmark	0–0	Northern Ireland	Copenhagen, Denmark
20:00 UTC+2		Report		Stadium: Parken Stadium; Attendance: 41,482; Referee: Konrad Plautz (Austria)

11 October Euro 2008 qualifying	Liechtenstein	0–4	Denmark	Vaduz, Liechtenstein
20:15 UTC+2		Report	D. Jensen 29'; Gravgaard 32'; Tomasson 51', 64'	Stadium: Rheinpark Stadion; Attendance: 2,665; Referee: Ceri Richards (Wales)

15 November Friendly	Czech Republic	1–1	Denmark	Prague, Czech Republic
20:15 UTC+1	Baroš 90'	Report	Løvenkrands 28'	Stadium: Toyota Arena; Attendance: 6,852; Referee: Damir Skomina (Slovenia)

=== 2007 ===
6 February Friendly	Australia	1–3	Denmark	London, England
20:00 UTC+0	Emerton 85'	Report	Tomasson 5', 36'; Jensen 27'	Stadium: Loftus Road; Attendance: 12,476; Referee: Rob Styles (England)

24 March Euro 2008 qualifying	Spain	2–1	Denmark	Madrid, Spain
22:00 UTC+1	Morientes 34'; Villa 45+1'	Report	Gravgaard 49'	Stadium: Santiago Bernabéu; Attendance: 73,575; Referee: Massimo Busacca (Switzerland)

28 March Friendly	Germany	0–1	Denmark	Duisburg, Germany
20:00 UTC+2		Report	Bendtner 81'	Stadium: MSV-Arena; Attendance: 31,500; Referee: Howard Webb (England)

2 June Euro 2008 qualifying	Denmark	0–3; Awarded (Note: The Denmark v Sweden match was abandoned in the 89th minute with the score at 3–3, following a fan attack on the referee. UEFA awarded the match as a 3–0 forfeit win to Sweden following a hearing on 8 June 2007 but maintains the original goals and the yellow and red cards.)	Sweden	Copenhagen, Denmark
20:00 UTC+2	Agger 34'; Tomasson 62'; Andreasen 75'	Report	Elmander 7', 26'; Hansson 23'	Stadium: Parken Stadium; Attendance: 42,083; Referee: Herbert Fandel (Germany)

6 June Euro 2008 qualifying	Latvia	0–2	Denmark	Riga, Latvia
21:30 UTC+3		Report	Rommedahl 15', 17'	Stadium: Skonto Stadions; Attendance: 7,500; Referee: Matteo Trefoloni (Italy)

22 August Friendly	Denmark	0–4	Republic of Ireland	Aarhus, Denmark
20:00 UTC+2		Report	Keane 29', 40'; Long 54', 66'	Stadium: NRGi Park; Attendance: 17,331; Referee: Thomas Einwaller (Austria)

8 September Euro 2008 qualifying	Sweden	0–0	Denmark	Solna, Sweden
20:30 UTC+2		Report		Stadium: Råsunda Stadium; Attendance: 33,082; Referee: Frank De Bleeckere (Belgium)

12 September Euro 2008 qualifying	Denmark	4–0	Liechtenstein	Aarhus, Denmark (Note: Denmark required to play two qualifying games at least 140 km away from Copenhagen as punishment for the abandonment of their previous home match.)
20:00 UTC+2	Nordstrand 3', 36'; M. Laursen 12'; Tomasson 18'	Report		Stadium: NRGi Park; Attendance: 20,005; Referee: Mark Clattenburg (England)

13 October Euro 2008 qualifying	Denmark	1–3	Spain	Aarhus, Denmark
20:00 UTC+3	Tomasson 87'	Report	Tamudo 14'; Ramos 40'; Riera 89'	Stadium: NRGi Park; Attendance: 19,849; Referee: Ľuboš Micheľ (Slovakia)

17 October Euro 2008 qualifying	Denmark	3–1	Latvia	Copenhagen, Denmark
20:00 UTC+2	Tomasson 7' (pen.); U. Laursen 27'; Rommedahl 90'	Report	Gorkšs 80'	Stadium: Parken Stadium; Attendance: 19,004; Referee: Cüneyt Çakır (Turkey)

17 November Euro 2008 qualifying	Northern Ireland	2–1	Denmark	Belfast, Northern Ireland
19:45 UTC+0	Feeney 62'; Healy 80'	Report	Bendtner 51'	Stadium: Windsor Park; Attendance: 12,997; Referee: Pieter Vink (Netherlands)

21 November Euro 2008 qualifying	Denmark	3–0	Iceland	Copenhagen, Denmark
20:00 UTC+1	Bendtner 34'; Tomasson 44'; Kahlenberg 59'			Stadium: Parken Stadium; Attendance: 15,393; Referee: Olegário Benquerença (Portugal)

=== 2008 ===
6 February Friendly	Slovenia	1–2	Denmark	Nova Gorica, Slovenia
20:00 UTC+1	Novaković 38'	Report	Tomasson 31' (pen.); Bendtner 63'	Stadium: Stadion Športni Park; Attendance: 1,500; Referee: Thorsten Kinhöfer (Germany)

26 March Friendly	Denmark	1–1	Czech Republic	Herning, Denmark
20:15 UTC+1	Bendtner 25'	Report	Koller 42'	Stadium: SAS Arena; Attendance: 10,456; Referee: Tomasz Mikulski (Poland)

29 May Friendly	Netherlands	1–1	Denmark	Eindhoven, Netherlands
20:00 UTC+2	Nistelrooy 29'	Report	Poulsen 55'	Stadium: Philips Stadion; Attendance: 34,000; Referee: Tony Chapron (France)

1 June Friendly	Poland	1–1	Denmark	Chorzów, Poland
16:00 UTC+2	Krzynówek 43'	Report	Vingaard 28'	Stadium: Stadion Śląski; Attendance: 40,000; Referee: Philippe Kalt (France)

20 August Friendly	Denmark	0–3	Spain	Copenhagen, Denmark
20:15 UTC+2		Report	Alonso 50', 90'; Xavi 74'	Stadium: Parken Stadium; Attendance: 26,155; Referee: Martin Hansson (Sweden)

6 September 2010 World Cup qualification	Hungary	0–0	Denmark	Budapest, Hungary
19:45 UTC+2		Report		Stadium: Ferenc Puskás Stadium; Attendance: 18,984; Referee: Alain Hamer (Luxembourg)

10 September 2010 World Cup qualification	Portugal	2–3	Denmark	Lisbon, Portugal
20:45 UTC+1	Nani 42'; Deco 86' (pen.)	Report	Bendtner 84'; C. Poulsen 88'; D. Jensen 90+2'	Stadium: Estádio José Alvalade; Attendance: 33,000; Referee: Howard Webb (England)

11 October 2010 World Cup qualification	Denmark	3–0	Malta	Copenhagen, Denmark
20:00 UTC+2	S. Larsen 10', 46'; Agger 29' (pen.)	Report		Stadium: Parken Stadium; Attendance: 33,124; Referee: Levan Paniashvili (Georgia)

19 November Friendly	Denmark	0–1	Wales	Brøndby, Denmark
20:15 UTC+1		Report	Bellamy 77'	Stadium: Brøndby Stadium; Attendance: 10,271; Referee: Michael Weiner (Germany)

=== 2009 ===
11 February Friendly	Greece	1–1	Denmark	Piraeus, Greece
21:15 UTC+2	Gekas 61'	Report	Borring 49'	Stadium: Karaiskakis Stadium; Attendance: 5,000; Referee: Alberto Undiano Mallenco (Spain)

28 March 2010 World Cup qualification	Malta	0–3	Denmark	Ta' Qali, Denmark
20:00 UTC+1		Report	S. Larsen 12', 23'; Nordstrand 89'	Stadium: Ta' Qali Stadium; Attendance: 6,235; Referee: Tomasz Mikulski (Poland)

1 April 2010 World Cup qualification	Denmark	3–0	Albania	Copenhagen, Denmark
20:15 UTC+2	L. Andreasen 31'; S. Larsen 37'; C. Poulsen 80'	Report		Stadium: Parken Stadium; Attendance: 24,320; Referee: Damir Skomina (Slovenia)

6 June 2010 World Cup qualification	Sweden	0–1	Denmark	Solna, Sweden
20:00 UTC+2		Report	Kahlenberg 22'	Stadium: Råsunda Stadium; Attendance: 33,619; Referee: Mike Riley (England)

12 August Friendly	Denmark	1–2	Chile	Brøndby, Denmark
20:15 UTC+2	Schøne 63'	Report	Paredes 61'; Sanchez 69'	Stadium: Brøndby Stadium; Attendance: 8,700; Referee: Kristinn Jakobsson (Iceland)

5 September 2010 World Cup qualification	Denmark	1–1	Portugal	Copenhagen, Denmark
20:00 UTC+2	Bendtner 43'	Report	Liédson 86'	Stadium: Parken Stadium; Attendance: 37,998; Referee: Massimo Busacca (Switzerland)

9 September 2010 World Cup qualification	Albania	1–1	Denmark	Tirana, Albania
20:30 UTC+2	Bogdani 51'	Report	Bendtner 40'	Stadium: Qemal Stafa; Attendance: 18,000; Referee: Cüneyt Çakır (Turkey)

10 October 2010 World Cup qualification	Denmark	1–0	Sweden	Copenhagen, Denmark
20:00 UTC+2	J. Poulsen 78'	Report		Stadium: Parken Stadium; Attendance: 37,800; Referee: Manuel Mejuto González (Spain)

14 October 2010 World Cup qualification	Denmark	0–1	Hungary	Copenhagen, Denmark
20:45 UTC+2		Report	Buzsáky 35'	Stadium: Parken Stadium; Attendance: 36,966; Referee: Florian Meyer (Germany)

14 November Friendly	Denmark	0–0	South Korea	Esbjerg, Denmark
20:00 UTC+1		Report		Stadium: Blue Water Arena; Attendance: 15,460; Referee: Martin Hansson (Sweden)

18 November Friendly	Denmark	3–1	United States	Aarhus, Denmark
20:30 UTC+1	Absalonsen 47'; Rieks 52'; Bernburg 55'	Report	Cunningham 26'	Stadium: NRGi Park; Attendance: 15,192; Referee: Craig Thomson (Scotland)

== See also ==
- List of Denmark national football team results
- Denmark national football team statistics

== Sources ==
- Landsholdsdatabasen at Danish Football Association
- A-LANDSKAMPE - 2000 - 2009 at Haslund.info
