= 2002 FIFA World Cup qualification =

2002 football competition

Tournament details
- Dates: 4 March 2000 – 25 November 2001
- Teams: 199 (from 6 confederations)

Tournament statistics
- Matches played: 777
- Goals scored: 2,452 (3.16 per match)
- Attendance: 17,242,036 (22,191 per match)
- Top scorer(s): (Australia) Archie Thompson (16 goals)

The 2002 FIFA World Cup qualification competition was a series of tournaments organised by the six FIFA confederations. Each confederation — the AFC (Asia), CAF (Africa), CONCACAF (North, Central America and Caribbean), CONMEBOL (South America), OFC (Oceania), and UEFA (Europe) — was allocated a certain number of the 32 places at the tournament. 199 teams entered the tournament qualification rounds, competing for 32 spots in the final tournament. South Korea and Japan, as the co-hosts, and France, as the defending champions, qualified automatically, leaving 29 spots open for competition.

== Qualified teams ==
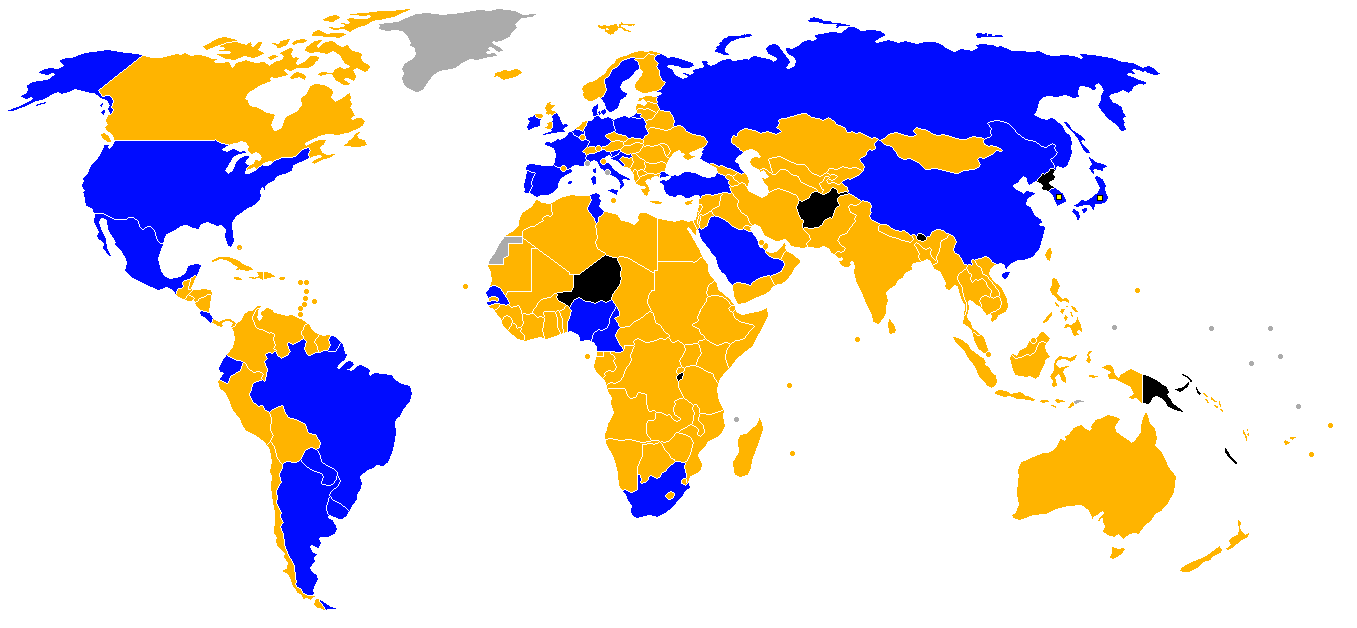
Final qualification status Country qualified for World Cup Country failed to qualify Country did not enter World Cup Country not a FIFA member

Team	Method of qualification	Date of qualification	Finals appearance	Last appearance	Consecutive finals appearances	Previous best performance	FIFA ranking at start of event
Japan	Hosts	31 May 1996	2nd	1998	2	Group stage (1998)	32
South Korea	Hosts	31 May 1996	6th	1998	5	Group stage (1954, 1986, 1990, 1994, 1998)	40
France	Defending Champions	12 July 1998	11th	1998	2	Winners (1998)	1
Cameroon	CAF final round group A winners	1 July 2001	5th	1998	4	Quarter-finals (1990)	17
South Africa	CAF final round group E winners	1 July 2001	2nd	1998	2	Group stage (1998)	37
Tunisia	CAF final round group D winners	15 July 2001	3rd	1998	2	Group stage (1978, 1998)	31
Senegal	CAF final round group C winners	21 July 2001	1st	—	1	—	42
Nigeria	CAF final round group B winners	29 July 2001	3rd	1998	3	Round of 16 (1994, 1998)	27
Argentina	CONMEBOL winners	15 August 2001	13th	1998	8	Winners (1978, 1986)	3
Poland	UEFA Group 5 winners	1 September 2001	6th	1986	1	Third place (1974, 1982)	38
Sweden	UEFA Group 4 winners	5 September 2001	10th	1994	1	Runners-up (1958)	19
Spain	UEFA Group 7 winners	5 September 2001	11th	1998	7	Fourth place (1950)	8
Costa Rica	CONCACAF final round winners	5 September 2001	2nd	1990	1	Round of 16 (1990)	29
Russia	UEFA Group 1 winners	6 October 2001	9th (Note: This is the 2nd appearance of Russia at the FIFA World Cup. However FIFA considers Russia as the successor team of the USSR.)	1994	1	Fourth place (1966)	28
Portugal	UEFA Group 2 winners	6 October 2001	3rd	1986	1	Third place (1966)	5
Denmark	UEFA Group 3 winners	6 October 2001	3rd	1998	2	Quarter-finals (1998)	20
Croatia	UEFA Group 6 winners	6 October 2001	2nd	1998	2	Third place (1998)	21
Italy	UEFA Group 8 winners	6 October 2001	15th	1998	11	Winners (1934, 1938, 1982)	6
England	UEFA Group 9 winners	6 October 2001	11th	1998	2	Winners (1966)	12
China	AFC second round Group B winners	7 October 2001	1st	—	1	—	50
United States	CONCACAF final round runners-up	7 October 2001	7th	1998	4	Third place (1930)	13
Saudi Arabia	AFC second round Group A winners	21 October 2001	3rd	1998	3	Round of 16 (1994)	34
Ecuador	CONMEBOL runners-up	7 November 2001	1st	—	1	—	36
Paraguay	CONMEBOL 4th place	8 November 2001	6th	1998	2	Round of 16 (1986, 1998)	18
Mexico	CONCACAF final round 3rd place	11 November 2001	12th	1998	3	Quarter-finals (1970, 1986)	7
Belgium	UEFA play-off winners	14 November 2001	11th	1998	6	Fourth place (1986)	23
Germany	UEFA play-off winners	14 November 2001	15th	1998	12	Winners (1954, 1974, 1990)	11
Slovenia	UEFA play-off winners	14 November 2001	1st	—	1	—	25
Turkey	UEFA play-off winners	14 November 2001	2nd	1954	1	Group stage (1954)	22
Brazil	CONMEBOL 3rd place	14 November 2001	17th	1998	17	Winners (1958, 1962, 1970, 1994)	2
Republic of Ireland	UEFA-AFC play-off winners	15 November 2001	3rd	1994	1	Quarter-finals (1990)	15
Uruguay	CONMEBOL v OFC play-off winners	25 November 2001	10th	1990	1	Winners (1930, 1950)	24

^{1}Includes 10 appearances by DFB representing West Germany between 1954 and 1990. Excludes 1 appearance by DVF representing East Germany between 1954 and 1990.
^{2}Includes appearances by USSR.

== Qualification process ==
The 32 spots available in the 2002 World Cup would be distributed among the continental zones as follows:

- Europe (UEFA): 14.5 places, 1 of them went to automatic qualifier France, while the other 13.5 places were contested by 50 teams. The winner of the 0.5 place would advance to the intercontinental play-offs (against a team from AFC)
- South America (CONMEBOL): 4.5 places, contested by 10 teams. The winner of the 0.5 place would advance to the intercontinental play-offs (against a team from OFC).
- North, Central America and Caribbean (CONCACAF): 3 places, contested by 35 teams.
- Africa (CAF): 5 places, contested by 51 teams.
- Asia (AFC): 4.5 places, 2 of them went to automatic qualifiers South Korea and Japan, while the other 2.5 places were contested by 40 teams. The winner of the 0.5 place would advance to the intercontinental play-offs (against a team from UEFA).
- Oceania (OFC): 0.5 place, contested by 10 teams. The winner of the 0.5 place would advance to the intercontinental play-offs (against a team from CONMEBOL).

A total of 193 teams played at least one qualifying match. A total of 777 qualifying matches were played, and 2452 goals were scored (an average of 3.17 per match).

=== Summary of qualification ===
Confederation	Available slots in finals	Teams started	Teams eliminated	Teams qualified	Qualifying start date	Qualifying end date
AFC	2+2 or 3+2	39+2	37	2+2	24 November 2000	15 November 2001
CAF	5	50	45	5	7 April 2000	29 July 2001
CONCACAF	3	34	31	3	4 March 2000	11 November 2001
CONMEBOL	4 or 5	10	5	5	28 March 2000	25 November 2001
OFC	0 or 1	10	10	0	7 April 2001	25 November 2001
UEFA	13+1 or 14+1	50+1	36	14+1	16 August 2000	15 November 2001
Total	29+3	193+3	164	29+3	4 March 2000	25 November 2001

== Confederation qualification ==
=== AFC ===
The Asian Football Confederation was allocated four and half qualifying berths for the 2002 FIFA World Cup, South Korea and Japan, the co-hosts, qualified automatically, leaving two and half spots open for competition between 40 teams.

Myanmar withdrew from the tournament after being placed in group 2 but before any matches had been played, therefore reducing the group to three teams.

Afghanistan, Bhutan and North Korea chose not to participate.

Asia's two remaining automatic qualifying berths were taken by Saudi Arabia and China. Iran lost their AFC–UEFA playoff against the Republic of Ireland.

There were three rounds of play:

- First round: The 39 teams were divided into nine groups of four teams each, and one group of three teams. The teams played against each other twice, except in group 2, where the teams played against each other once. The group winners advanced to the final round.
- Second round: The ten group winners from the first round were divided into two groups of five teams. The teams played against each other on a home-and-away basis. The group winners qualified directly to the World Cup. The runners-up advanced to the AFC play-off.
- Play-off: The two group runners-up from the second round played against each other on a home-and-away basis. The winner advanced to the UEFA–AFC inter-confederation play-off.

==== Final positions (second round) ====
Group A

Pos	Team	Pld	Pts
1	Saudi Arabia	8	17
2	Iran	8	15
3	Bahrain	8	10
4	Iraq	8	7
5	Thailand	8	4

Group B

Pos	Team	Pld	Pts
1	China	8	19
2	United Arab Emirates	8	11
3	Uzbekistan	8	10
4	Qatar	8	9
5	Oman	8	6

==== AFC play-off ====
Team 1	Agg.	Team 2	1st leg	2nd leg
Iran	4–0	United Arab Emirates	1–0	3–0

=== CAF ===
The Confederation of African Football was allocated five qualifying berths for the 2002 FIFA World Cup. 51 teams entered the qualification process.

Burundi withdrew before the draw was made, while Niger chose not to participate.

Guinea were disqualified from the competition during the final round for government interference with its national association, resulting in their results obtained in the final round being annulled.

Africa's five automatic qualifying berths were taken by Cameroon, Senegal, Tunisia, South Africa, and Nigeria.

There were two rounds of play:

- First round: The 50 teams were divided into five pools of ten teams each. In each pool, the 10 teams were paired up to play knockout matches on a home-and-away basis. The winners advanced to the second round.
- Second round: The 25 teams were divided into five groups of five teams each. The teams played against each other on a home-and-away basis. The group winners qualified.

==== Final positions (second round) ====
Group A
Group B
Group C

Pos	Team	Pld	Pts
1	Cameroon	8	19
2	Angola	8	13
3	Zambia	8	11
4	Togo	8	9
5	Libya	8	2

Pos	Team	Pld	Pts
1	Nigeria	8	16
2	Liberia	8	15
3	Sudan	8	12
4	Ghana	8	11
5	Sierra Leone	8	4

Pos	Team	Pld	Pts
1	Senegal	8	15
2	Morocco	8	15
3	Egypt	8	13
4	Algeria	8	8
5	Namibia	8	2

Group D
Group E

Pos	Team	Pld	Pts
1	Tunisia	8	20
2	Ivory Coast	8	15
3	DR Congo	8	10
4	Madagascar	8	6
5	Congo	8	5

Pos	Team	Pld	Pts
1	South Africa	6	16
2	Zimbabwe	6	12
3	Burkina Faso	6	5
4	Malawi	6	1
5	Guinea	0	0

=== CONCACAF ===
A total of 35 CONCACAF teams entered the competition. Guyana were suspended by FIFA before playing, leaving 34 nations in the race. Mexico, USA, Jamaica and Costa Rica, the four highest-ranked teams according to FIFA, received byes and advanced to the semi-finals, while Canada advanced to the play-offs . The remaining teams were divided into zones, based on geographical locations, as follows:

- Caribbean Zone: The 24 teams were divided into groups of eight teams each. The teams played in a three-round knockout tournament. The winners would advance to the semi-finals, while the runners-up would advance to the play-offs.
- Central American Zone: The six teams are divided into groups of three teams each. The teams played against each other. The winners of the group would advance to the semi-finals, while the runners-up would advance to the play-offs.
- Play-offs: the six teams were paired up to play knockout matches on a home-and-away basis. A team from North or Central America would play against a team from the Caribbean, and the winners would advance to the semi-finals.
- Semi-finals: the 12 teams were divided into three groups of four teams each. They played against each other on a home-and-away basis. The group winners and runners-up would advance to the final round.
- Final round: the six teams played against each other on a home-and-away basis. The top three teams would qualify for the 2002 FIFA World Cup.

Legend
Countries that qualified for the 2002 World Cup

==== Final positions (final round) ====
Pos	Team	Pld	Pts
1	Costa Rica	10	23
2	Mexico	10	17
3	United States	10	17
4	Honduras	10	14
5	Jamaica	10	8
6	Trinidad and Tobago	10	5

Source: FIFA

=== CONMEBOL ===
A total of 10 CONMEBOL teams entered the competition. competing for four and half places in the final tournament.

The 10 teams played against each other on a home-and-away basis. The top 4 teams qualified. The 5th-placed team advanced to the CONMEBOL / OFC Intercontinental play-off.

Legend
Countries that qualified for the 2002 World Cup

==== Final positions ====
Pos	Team	Pld	Pts
1	Argentina	18	43
2	Ecuador	18	31
3	Brazil	18	30
4	Paraguay	18	30
5	Uruguay	18	27
6	Colombia	18	27
7	Bolivia	18	18
8	Peru	18	16
9	Venezuela	18	16
10	Chile	18	12

=== OFC ===
A total of 10 teams entered the competition. competing for a half place in the final tournament.

Papua New Guinea chose not to participate.

There would be two rounds of play:

- First round: The 10 teams were divided into two groups of five teams each. The teams played against each other once. The group winners would advance to the second round.
- Second round: The two teams played against each other on a home-and-away basis. The winner would advance to the CONMEBOL/OFC inter-continental play-off.

Australia's 31–0 win over American Samoa established a World Cup record for the highest margin of victory in a qualifying match.

==== Final positions (second round) ====
Team 1	Agg.	Team 2	1st leg	2nd leg
New Zealand	1–6	Australia	0–2	1–4

=== UEFA ===
The European section acted as qualifiers for the 2002 FIFA World Cup, for national teams which are members of the Union of European Football Associations (UEFA). Apart from France, who qualified automatically as holders, a total of thirteen and half slots in the final tournament were available for UEFA teams.

The 50 teams were divided into nine groups, five groups of six teams and four groups of five teams. The teams played against each other on a home-and-away basis. The group winners would qualify. Among the runners-up, the runner-up of Group 2 was drawn randomly to advance to the UEFA–AFC Intercontinental play-off. The other runners-up would advance to the UEFA play-offs.

In the play-offs, the eight teams were paired up to play knockout matches on a home-and-away basis. The four aggregate winners qualified. The qualifying process started on 2 September 2000, after UEFA Euro 2000, and ended on 14 November 2001.

The Netherlands and Romania both failed to qualify for the tournament for the first time since 1986, the former finishing third in Group 2 behind Portugal and Republic of Ireland and the latter suffering a shock loss to Slovenia in the play-offs.

Legend
Countries that qualified for the 2002 World Cup
Countries that advanced to the Play-offs
Countries that advanced to the inter-confederation play-off

==== Final positions (first round) ====
Group 1
Group 2
Group 3

Team	Pld	Pts
Russia	10	23
Slovenia	10	20
FR Yugoslavia	10	19
Switzerland	10	14
Faroe Islands	10	7
Luxembourg	10	0

Team	Pld	Pts
Portugal	10	24
Republic of Ireland	10	24
Netherlands	10	20
Estonia	10	8
Cyprus	10	8
Andorra	10	0

Team	Pld	Pts
Denmark	10	22
Czech Republic	10	20
Bulgaria	10	17
Iceland	10	13
Northern Ireland	10	11
Malta	10	1

Group 4
Group 5
Group 6

Team	Pld	Pts
Sweden	10	26
Turkey	10	21
Slovakia	10	17
Macedonia	10	7
Moldova	10	6
Azerbaijan	10	5

Team	Pld	Pts
Poland	10	21
Ukraine	10	17
Belarus	10	15
Norway	10	10
Wales	10	9
Armenia	10	5

Team	Pld	Pts
Croatia	8	18
Belgium	8	17
Scotland	8	15
Latvia	8	4
San Marino	8	1

Group 7
Group 8
Group 9

Team	Pld	Pts
Spain	8	20
Austria	8	15
Israel	8	12
Bosnia and Herzegovina	8	8
Liechtenstein	8	0

Team	Pld	Pts
Italy	8	20
Romania	8	16
Georgia	8	10
Hungary	8	8
Lithuania	8	2

Team	Pld	Pts
England	8	17
Germany	8	17
Finland	8	12
Greece	8	7
Albania	8	3

==== Play-offs ====
Team 1	Agg.	Team 2	1st leg	2nd leg
Belgium	2–0	Czech Republic	1–0	1–0
Ukraine	2–5	Germany	1–1	1–4
Slovenia	3–2	Romania	2–1	1–1
Austria	0–6	Turkey	0–1	0–5

== Inter-confederation play-offs ==
There were two scheduled inter-confederation playoffs to determine the final two qualification spots to the finals. The first legs were played on 10 and 20 November 2001, and the second legs were played on 15 and 25 November 2001.

=== UEFA v AFC ===
Team 1	Agg.	Team 2	1st leg	2nd leg
Republic of Ireland	2–1	Iran	2–0	0–1

=== OFC v CONMEBOL ===
Team 1	Agg.	Team 2	1st leg	2nd leg
Australia	1–3	Uruguay	1–0	0–3

== Top goalscorers ==
There were 2,452 goals scored in 777 matches, for an average of 3.16 goals per match.

16 goals

- (Australia) Archie Thompson

15 goals

- (Honduras) Carlos Pavón

14 goals

- (Australia) David Zdrilic

11 goals

- (Haiti) Golman Pierre
- (Ivory Coast) Ibrahima Bakayoko
- (Oman) Hani Al-Dhabit
- (Oman) Yaqoob Juma Al-Mukhaini
- (Saudi Arabia) Talal Al-Meshal
- (Syria) Said Bayazid

10 goals

- (Costa Rica) Rolando Fonseca
- (Iran) Ali Daei
- (Saudi Arabia) Obeid Al-Dosari
- (Thailand) Kiatisuk Senamuang
- (Ukraine) Andriy Shevchenko
- (United Arab Emirates) Yaser Salem Ali
- (Uzbekistan) Jafar Irismetov

Below are goalscorer lists for all confederations and the inter-confederation play-offs:

- AFC
- CAF
- CONCACAF
- CONMEBOL
- OFC
- UEFA
- Inter-confederation play-offs

== Trivia ==
- On their way to the 2002 World Cup, Brazil endured their worst qualifying campaign ever, losing 6 matches (the only time they have lost more than 2 games in a qualifying campaign) and finishing 3rd of the South American qualifying group (the only time they have not emerged as leaders of their qualifying group). However, Brazil went on to win the 2002 World Cup with a record-breaking tally of 7 wins in 7 matches in the final competition, without facing extra time or penalty shoot-outs. The following teams also won all their final competition matches: Uruguay in 1930 (4 games), Italy in 1938 (4 games, 1 of which after extra time), Brazil in 1970 (6 games) and France in 1998 (7 games, of which 1 with a golden goal during extra time and 1 on penalties). In 1970, Brazil had also won all of their 6 preliminary competition matches. Uruguay did not play any preliminary round for 1930, as there was none, and Italy did not either for 1938 as they were automatically qualified for the World Cup as title holders.
- After finishing second in the group, where they famously lost 1–5 to England, Germany had to play qualifying play-offs for the only time in their history.
- Australia netted 31 goals against newcomers American Samoa, setting the record of the highest-scoring match and biggest margin of victory in an international match ever. This was only two days after Australia thrashed Tonga 22–0, a then international record. Also, Archie Thompson's 13 goals in the match against American Samoa surpassed the previous record of 10.
- Souleymane Mamam of Togo became the youngest player ever to play in a World Cup qualifying match at the age of 13 years and 310 days in the match against Zambia, in May 2001. He subbed in for Komlan Assignon, three minutes from full-time.
- The fastest-ever hat-trick in an "A" international was set when Abdul Hamid Bassiouny of Egypt needed only 177 seconds to bag his three goals in a game against Namibia.
- Switzerland's Kubilay Türkyilmaz scored a hat trick exclusively from penalties against the Faroe Islands. Brazil's Ronaldo would equal this against Argentina in his team's 3–1 win in the 2006 World Cup qualifying round.
