= Na Stínadlech =

Football stadium in Teplice, Czech Republic

AGC Aréna Na Stínadlech
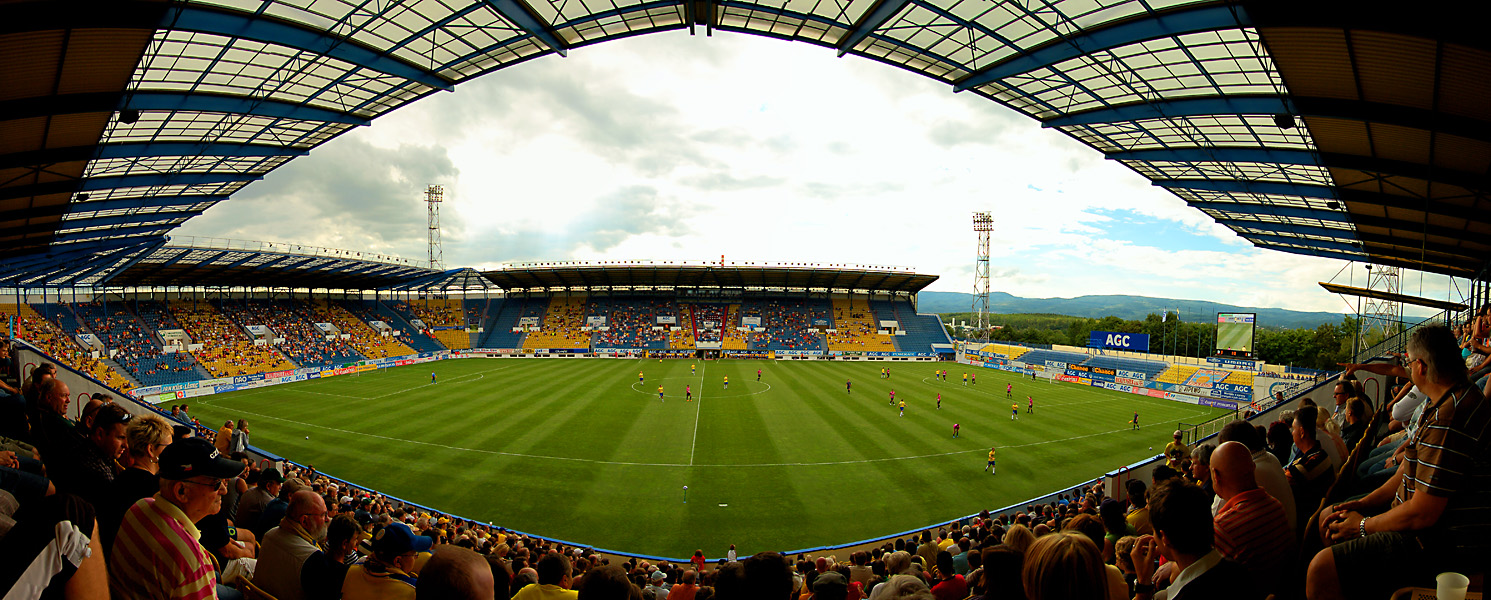
- Interactive map of AGC Aréna Na Stínadlech
- Location: Na Stínadlech 2796, Teplice, Czech Republic, 415 01
- Coordinates: 50°38′24″N 13°49′05″E
- Owner: FK Teplice
- Capacity: 17,078
- Surface: Grass
- Field size: 105 × 68 m

Construction
- Opened: May 9, 1973

Tenant
- FK Teplice

AGC Aréna Na Stínadlech is a football stadium in Teplice, Czech Republic. It is the home ground of FK Teplice. The stadium holds 17,078 and was built in 1973. The Czech Republic national football team often plays qualification games at the stadium and has very positive statistics there. As of October 2010, they have won 18 times from 19 games, drawing the other, in a 2002 friendly game against Sweden where they tied 3–3.

In the 2010–11 season, FK Ústí nad Labem ground-shared at Na Stinadlech because their Městský stadion stadium did not meet league criteria.

== International matches ==
Stadion Na Stínadlech has hosted 13 competitive and 7 friendly matches of the Czech Republic national football team.

| 18 September 1996 1998 FIFA World Cup; Qualification Group 6 | Czech Republic | 6–0 | Malta | Teplice, Czech Republic |
| 16:30 UTC+2; Match 538/30 | Berger 11', 63' (pen.); Nedvěd 29'; Kubík 77'; Šmicer 83'; Frýdek 86' | Report | | Stadium: Na Stínadlech; Attendance: 15,099; Referee: Mateo Beušan (Croatia) |

| 20 August 1997 1998 FIFA World Cup; Qualification Group 6 | Czech Republic | 2–0 | Faroe Islands | Teplice, Czech Republic |
| 16:30 UTC+2; Match 547/39 | Kuka 15' (pen.); Kozel 26' | Report | | Stadium: Na Stínadlech; Attendance: 8,322; Referee: Algirdas Dubinskas (Lithuania) |

| 14 October 1998 UEFA Euro 2000; Qualifying Group 9 | Czech Republic | 4–1 | Estonia | Teplice, Czech Republic |
| 17:00 UTC+2; Match 565/57 | Nedvěd 8'; Berger 20', 38'; Meet 45' (o.g.) | UEFA Report | Arbeiter 90+1' | Stadium: Na Stínadlech; Attendance: 13,123; Referee: Eyjólfur Ólafsson (Iceland) |

| 27 March 1999 UEFA Euro 2000; Qualifying Group 9 | Czech Republic | 2–0 | Lithuania | Teplice, Czech Republic |
| 16:00 UTC+1; Match 568/60 | Horňák 10'; Berger 74' (pen.) | UEFA Report | | Stadium: Na Stínadlech; Attendance: 14,658; Referee: Attila Juhos (Hungary) |

| 8 September 1999 UEFA Euro 2000; Qualifying Group 9 | Czech Republic | 3–0 | Bosnia and Herzegovina | Teplice, Czech Republic |
| 20:30 UTC+2; Match 575/67 | Koller 26'; Berger 59' (pen.); Poborský 67' | UEFA Report | | Stadium: Na Stínadlech; Attendance: 10,125; Referee: Karl-Erik Nilsson (Sweden) |

| 29 March 2000 International Friendly | Czech Republic | 3–1 | Australia | Teplice, Czech Republic |
| Match 580/72 | Fukal 9'; Koller 53'; Ulich 67' | ČMFS Report | Foster 89' | Stadium: Na Stínadlech; Attendance: 9,820; Referee: Hrivnák (Slovakia) |

| 7 October 2000 2002 FIFA World Cup; Qualification Group 3 | Czech Republic | 4–0 | Iceland | Teplice, Czech Republic |
| 19:00 CEST (UTC+02); Match 588/80 | Koller 17', 40'; Nedvěd 44', 90' | FIFA Report | | Stadium: Na Stínadlech; Attendance: 9,843; Referee: Vassaras (Greece) |

| 6 June 2001 2002 FIFA World Cup; Qualification Group 3 | Czech Republic | 3–1 | Northern Ireland | Teplice, Czech Republic |
| 17:00 CEST (UTC+02); Match 595/87 | Kuka 40', 87'; Baroš 90' | FIFA Report | Mulryne 45' | Stadium: Na Stínadlech; Attendance: 14,050; Referee: Sundell (Sweden) |

| 5 September 2001 2002 FIFA World Cup; Qualification Group 3 | Czech Republic | 3–2 | Malta | Teplice, Czech Republic |
| 17:00 CEST (UTC+02); Match 598/90 | Jankulovski 20'; Lokvenc 37'; Baroš 68' | FIFA Report | Carabott 22' (pen.); Agius 55' | Stadium: Na Stínadlech; Attendance: 9,280; Referee: Mammedov (Azerbaijan) |

| 16 October 2002 UEFA Euro 2004; Qualifying Group 3 | Czech Republic | 2–0 | Belarus | Teplice, Czech Republic |
| 16:30 CEST (UTC+02); Match 610/102 | Poborský 6'; Baroš 23' | UEFA Report | | Stadium: Na Stínadlech; Attendance: 12,850; Referee: Fleischer (Germany) |

| 20 November 2002 International Friendly | Czech Republic | 3–3 | Sweden | Teplice, Czech Republic |
| Match 611/103 | Fukal 8'; Vachoušek 45'; Baroš 63' | ČMFS Report | Nilsson 29', 43'; Allbäck 65' | Stadium: Na Stínadlech; Attendance: 10,238; Referee: Bosat (Turkey) |

| 30 April 2003 International Friendly | Czech Republic | 4–0 | Turkey | Teplice, Czech Republic |
| Match 615/107 | Rosický 2'; Koller 21'; Šmicer 27'; Baroš 38' | ČMFS Report | | Stadium: Na Stínadlech; Attendance: 14,156; Referee: Szabó (Hungary) |

| 12 November 2003 International Friendly | Czech Republic | 5–1 | Canada | Teplice, Czech Republic |
| Match 620/112 | Jankulovski 27' (pen.); Heinz 49'; Poborský 56'; Sionko 63'; Skácel 81' | ČMFS Report | Radzinski 89' | Stadium: Na Stínadlech; Attendance: 8,343; Referee: Sundell (Sweden) |

| 6 June 2004 International Friendly | Czech Republic | 2–0 | Estonia | Teplice, Czech Republic |
| Match 625/117 | Baroš 6', 22' | ČMFS Report | | Stadium: Na Stínadlech; Attendance: 11,873; Referee: Brugger (Austria) |

| 26 March 2005 2006 FIFA World Cup; Qualification Group 1 | Czech Republic | 4–3 | Finland | Teplice, Czech Republic |
| 17:00 CET (UTC+01); Match 637/129 | Baroš 7'; Rosický 34'; Polák 58'; Lokvenc 87' | FIFA Report | Litmanen 46'; Riihilahti 73'; Johansson 79' | Stadium: Na Stínadlech; Attendance: 16,200; Referee: Larsen (Denmark) |

| 8 June 2005 2006 FIFA World Cup; Qualification Group 1 | Czech Republic | 6–1 | North Macedonia | Teplice, Czech Republic |
| 17:00 CEST (UTC+02); Match 640/132 | Koller 41', 45', 48', 52'; Rosický 73'; Baroš 87' | FIFA Report | Pandev 13' | Stadium: Na Stínadlech; Attendance: 14,150; Referee: Dauden Ibanez (Spain) |

| 2 September 2006 UEFA Euro 2008; Qualifying Group D | Czech Republic | 2–1 | Wales | Teplice, Czech Republic |
| 20:15 CEST (UTC+02); Match 656/148 | Lafata 76', 89' | UEFA Report | Jiránek 85' (o.g.) | Stadium: Na Stínadlech; Attendance: 16,200; Referee: Eriksson (Sweden) |

| 15 October 2008 2010 FIFA World Cup; Qualification Group 3 | Czech Republic | 1–0 | Slovenia | Teplice, Czech Republic |
| 17:30 CEST (UTC+02); Match 681/173 | Sionko 63' | FIFA Report | | Stadium: Na Stínadlech; Attendance: 15,220; Referee: Atkinson (England) |

| 12 August 2009 International Friendly | Czech Republic | 3–1 | Belgium | Teplice, Czech Republic |
| Match 687/179 | Hubník 27'; Baroš 42' (pen.); Rozehnal 78' | ČMFS Report | Vertonghen 12' | Stadium: Na Stínadlech; Attendance: 13,890; Referee: Sippel (Germany) |

| 11 September 2012 International Friendly | Czech Republic | 0–1 | Finland | Teplice, Czech Republic |
| Match 723/215 | | ČMFS Report | Pukki 43' | Stadium: Na Stínadlech; Attendance: 9,053; Referee: Siejewicz (Poland) |

== See also ==
- List of football stadiums in the Czech Republic
- Lists of stadiums
