= 2002 FIFA World Cup qualification (UEFA) =

Tournament details
- Dates: 16 August 2000 – 15 November 2001
- Teams: 50 (from 1 confederation)

Tournament statistics
- Matches played: 238
- Goals scored: 677 (2.84 per match)
- Attendance: 4,786,293 (20,110 per match)
- Top scorer(s): (Ukraine) Andriy Shevchenko (10 goals)

Listed below are the dates and results for the 2002 FIFA World Cup qualification rounds for UEFA teams.

The European section of the 2002 FIFA World Cup qualification acted as qualifiers for the 2002 FIFA World Cup, which was held in South Korea and Japan, for national teams which are members of the UEFA. Apart from France, who qualified automatically as defending champions, a total of 13.5 slots in the final tournament were available for UEFA teams.

The 50 teams were divided into nine groups, five groups of six teams and four groups of five teams. The teams played against each other on a home-and-away basis. The group winners would qualify. Among the runners-up, Group 2 was drawn randomly to advance to the UEFA–AFC Intercontinental play-off while the remaining eight runners-up would advance to the UEFA play-offs.

In the play-offs, the eight teams were paired up to play knockout matches on a home-and-away basis. The four aggregate winners qualified. The qualifying process started on 2 September 2000, after UEFA Euro 2000, and ended on 14 November 2001.

== Qualification seeding (UEFA) ==
The draw was made on 7 December 1999, and was based on average points per game achieved in 1998 FIFA World Cup qualification and UEFA Euro 2000 qualifying. France qualified automatically as title holders, and because Belgium and Netherlands, as hosts, had not had to qualify for UEFA Euro 2000, only their 1998 World Cup result was used. Andorra made their debut in World Cup qualifying.

Pot 1
Team	Coeff	Rank
Spain	2,61	1
Romania	2,60	2
Norway	2,50	3
Sweden	2,39	4
Netherlands	2,38	5
Czech Republic	2,30	6
Germany	2,28	7
Belgium	2,25	8
FR Yugoslavia	2,22	9

Pot 2
Team	Coeff	Rank
Austria	2,11	10
Portugal	2,10	11
Italy	2,06	12
Scotland	2,05	13
England	2,00	14
Russia	2,00	15
Ukraine	2,00	16
Turkey	1,94	17
Denmark	1,94	18

Pot 3
Team	Coeff	Rank
Republic of Ireland	1,89	19
Croatia	1,88	20
Slovakia	1,65	21
Israel	1,63	22
Bulgaria	1,63	23
Greece	1,61	24
Switzerland	1,50	25
Poland	1,44	26
Lithuania	1,40	27

Pot 4
Team	Coeff	Rank
Cyprus	1,38	28
Hungary	1,33	29
Finland	1,31	30
Iceland	1,20	31
Macedonia	1,17	32
Latvia	1,15	33
Bosnia and Herzegovina	1,11	34
Wales	1,00	35
Slovenia	1,00	36

Pot 5
Team	Coeff	Rank
Georgia	0,83	37
Armenia	0,80	38
Estonia	0,75	39
Northern Ireland	0,67	40
Albania	0,55	41
Faroe Islands	0,45	42
Belarus	0,39	43
Azerbaijan	0,39	44
Moldova	0,25	45
Liechtenstein	0,20	46
Andorra	0,00	47
Luxembourg	0,00	48
Malta	0,00	49
San Marino	0,00	50

== Summary ==
Table - top row: group winners, second row: group runners-up, third row: others. The winner of each group qualified for the 2002 FIFA World Cup together with winners of play-off. Group 2 was the last team drawn for its runner-up to participate in the UEFA/AFC intercontinental play-off. As runner-up in group 2, Republic of Ireland played a play-off against a team from the AFC confederation, whereas the others played against each other (UEFA play-off).

Winner of each group qualified directly for the 2002 FIFA World Cup
The runners-up advanced to the second round (play-offs); Group 2 runner-up advanced to the (UEFA–AFC play-off)
Other teams were eliminated after the first round

Group 1	Group 2	Group 3	Group 4	Group 5	Group 6	Group 7	Group 8	Group 9
Russia	Portugal	Denmark	Sweden	Poland	Croatia	Spain	Italy	England
Slovenia	Republic of Ireland	Czech Republic	Turkey	Ukraine	Belgium	Austria	Romania	Germany
FR Yugoslavia Switzerland Faroe Islands Luxembourg	Netherlands Estonia Cyprus Andorra	Bulgaria Iceland Northern Ireland Malta	Slovakia Macedonia Moldova Azerbaijan	Belarus Norway Wales Armenia	Scotland Latvia San Marino	Israel Bosnia and Herzegovina Liechtenstein	Georgia Hungary Lithuania	Finland Greece Albania

== First round ==
The winner of each group qualified directly, the runner-up advanced to play-off (either UEFA playoff or UEFA-AFC playoff).

=== Group 1 ===
Pos	Team	Pld	W	D	L	GF	GA	GD	Pts	Qualification	Russia national football team	Slovenia national football team	Serbia and Montenegro national football team	Switzerland national football team	Faroe Islands national football team	Luxembourg national football team
1	Russia	10	7	2	1	18	5	+13	23	Qualification to 2002 FIFA World Cup	—	1–1	1–1	4–0	1–0	3–0
2	Slovenia	10	5	5	0	17	9	+8	20	Advance to UEFA play-offs	2–1	—	1–1	2–2	3–0	2–0
3	FR Yugoslavia	10	5	4	1	22	8	+14	19		0–1	1–1	—	1–1	2–0	6–2
4	Switzerland	10	4	2	4	18	12	+6	14		0–1	0–1	1–2	—	5–1	5–0
5	Faroe Islands	10	2	1	7	6	23	−17	7		0–3	2–2	0–6	0–1	—	1–0
6	Luxembourg	10	0	0	10	4	28	−24	0		1–2	1–2	0–2	0–3	0–2	—

=== Group 2 ===
Pos	Team	Pld	W	D	L	GF	GA	GD	Pts	Qualification	Portugal national football team	Republic of Ireland national football team	Netherlands national football team	Estonia national football team	Cyprus national football team	Andorra national football team
1	Portugal	10	7	3	0	33	7	+26	24	Qualification to 2002 FIFA World Cup	—	1–1	2–2	5–0	6–0	3–0
2	Republic of Ireland	10	7	3	0	23	5	+18	24	Advance to inter-confederation play-offs	1–1	—	1–0	2–0	4–0	3–1
3	Netherlands	10	6	2	2	30	9	+21	20		0–2	2–2	—	5–0	4–0	4–0
4	Estonia	10	2	2	6	10	26	−16	8		1–3	0–2	2–4	—	2–2	1–0
5	Cyprus	10	2	2	6	13	31	−18	8		1–3	0–4	0–4	2–2	—	5–0
6	Andorra	10	0	0	10	5	36	−31	0		1–7	0–3	0–5	1–2	2–3	—

=== Group 3 ===
Pos	Team	Pld	W	D	L	GF	GA	GD	Pts	Qualification	Denmark national football team	Czech Republic national football team	Bulgaria national football team	Iceland national football team	Northern Ireland national football team	Malta national football team
1	Denmark	10	6	4	0	22	6	+16	22	Qualification to 2002 FIFA World Cup	—	2–1	1–1	6–0	1–1	2–1
2	Czech Republic	10	6	2	2	20	8	+12	20	Advance to UEFA play-offs	0–0	—	6–0	4–0	3–1	3–2
3	Bulgaria	10	5	2	3	14	15	−1	17		0–2	0–1	—	2–1	4–3	3–0
4	Iceland	10	4	1	5	14	20	−6	13		1–2	3–1	1–1	—	1–0	3–0
5	Northern Ireland	10	3	2	5	11	12	−1	11		1–1	0–1	0–1	3–0	—	1–0
6	Malta	10	0	1	9	4	24	−20	1		0–5	0–0	0–2	1–4	0–1	—

=== Group 4 ===
Pos	Team	Pld	W	D	L	GF	GA	GD	Pts	Qualification	Sweden men's national football team	Turkey national football team	Slovakia national football team	North Macedonia national football team	Moldova national football team	Azerbaijan national football team
1	Sweden	10	8	2	0	20	3	+17	26	Qualification to 2002 FIFA World Cup	—	1–1	2–0	1–0	6–0	3–0
2	Turkey	10	6	3	1	18	8	+10	21	Advance to UEFA play-offs	1–2	—	1–1	3–3	2–0	3–0
3	Slovakia	10	5	2	3	16	9	+7	17		0–0	0–1	—	2–0	4–2	3–1
4	Macedonia	10	1	4	5	11	18	−7	7		1–2	1–2	0–5	—	2–2	3–0
5	Moldova	10	1	3	6	6	20	−14	6		0–2	0–3	0–1	0–0	—	2–0
6	Azerbaijan	10	1	2	7	4	17	−13	5		0–1	0–1	2–0	1–1	0–0	—

=== Group 5 ===
Pos	Team	Pld	W	D	L	GF	GA	GD	Pts	Qualification	Poland national football team	Ukraine national football team	Belarus national football team	Norway national football team	Wales national football team	Armenia national football team
1	Poland	10	6	3	1	21	11	+10	21	Qualification to 2002 FIFA World Cup	—	1–1	3–1	3–0	0–0	4–0
2	Ukraine	10	4	5	1	13	8	+5	17	Advance to UEFA play-offs	1–3	—	0–0	0–0	1–1	3–0
3	Belarus	10	4	3	3	12	11	+1	15		4–1	0–2	—	2–1	2–1	2–1
4	Norway	10	2	4	4	12	14	−2	10		2–3	0–1	1–1	—	3–2	0–0
5	Wales	10	1	6	3	10	12	−2	9		1–2	1–1	1–0	1–1	—	0–0
6	Armenia	10	0	5	5	7	19	−12	5		1–1	2–3	0–0	1–4	2–2	—

=== Group 6 ===
Pos	Team	Pld	W	D	L	GF	GA	GD	Pts	Qualification	Croatia national football team	Belgium national football team	Scotland national football team	Latvia national football team	San Marino national football team
1	Croatia	8	5	3	0	15	2	+13	18	Qualification to 2002 FIFA World Cup	—	1–0	1–1	4–1	4–0
2	Belgium	8	5	2	1	25	6	+19	17	Advance to UEFA play-offs	0–0	—	2–0	3–1	10–1
3	Scotland	8	4	3	1	12	6	+6	15		0–0	2–2	—	2–1	4–0
4	Latvia	8	1	1	6	5	16	−11	4		0–1	0–4	0–1	—	1–1
5	San Marino	8	0	1	7	3	30	−27	1		0–4	1–4	0–2	0–1	—

=== Group 7 ===
Pos	Team	Pld	W	D	L	GF	GA	GD	Pts	Qualification	Spain national football team	Austria national football team	Israel national football team	Bosnia and Herzegovina national football team	Liechtenstein national football team
1	Spain	8	6	2	0	21	4	+17	20	Qualification to 2002 FIFA World Cup	—	4–0	2–0	4–1	5–0
2	Austria	8	4	3	1	10	8	+2	15	Advance to UEFA play-offs	1–1	—	2–1	2–0	2–0
3	Israel	8	3	3	2	11	7	+4	12		1–1	1–1	—	3–1	2–0
4	Bosnia and Herzegovina	8	2	2	4	12	12	0	8		1–2	1–1	0–0	—	5–0
5	Liechtenstein	8	0	0	8	0	23	−23	0		0–2	0–1	0–3	0–3	—

=== Group 8 ===
Pos	Team	Pld	W	D	L	GF	GA	GD	Pts	Qualification	Italy national football team	Romania national football team	Georgia national football team	Hungary national football team	Lithuania national football team
1	Italy	8	6	2	0	16	3	+13	20	Qualification to 2002 FIFA World Cup	—	3–0	2–0	1–0	4–0
2	Romania	8	5	1	2	10	7	+3	16	Advance to UEFA play-offs	0–2	—	1–1	2–0	1–0
3	Georgia	8	3	1	4	12	12	0	10		1–2	0–2	—	3–1	2–0
4	Hungary	8	2	2	4	14	13	+1	8		2–2	0–2	4–1	—	1–1
5	Lithuania	8	0	2	6	3	20	−17	2		0–0	1–2	0–4	1–6	—

=== Group 9 ===
Pos	Team	Pld	W	D	L	GF	GA	GD	Pts	Qualification	England national football team	Germany national football team	Finland national football team	Greece national football team	Albania national football team
1	England	8	5	2	1	16	6	+10	17	Qualification to 2002 FIFA World Cup	—	0–1	2–1	2–2	2–0
2	Germany	8	5	2	1	14	10	+4	17	Advance to UEFA play-offs	1–5	—	0–0	2–0	2–1
3	Finland	8	3	3	2	12	7	+5	12		0–0	2–2	—	5–1	2–1
4	Greece	8	2	1	5	7	17	−10	7		0–2	2–4	1–0	—	1–0
5	Albania	8	1	0	7	5	14	−9	3		1–3	0–2	0–2	2–0	—

== Second round ==
The draw for the play-offs was held on 31 August 2001 at FIFA's headquarters in Zurich, Switzerland. The nine group runners-up were placed into one pot, with eight teams drawn into four pairings (with the first team drawn hosting the first leg). The remaining team then faced an AFC team in the inter-confederation play-offs. UEFA were paired to face the AFC team by decision of the FIFA Executive Committee in October 1999.

Team 1	Agg.	Team 2	1st leg	2nd leg
Belgium	2–0	Czech Republic	1–0	1–0
Ukraine	2–5	Germany	1–1	1–4
Slovenia	3–2	Romania	2–1	1–1
Austria	0–6	Turkey	0–1	0–5

== Inter-confederation play-offs ==
As the Group 2 runner-up was the last team to be selected in the play-off draw on 31 August 2001, that team then faced an AFC team in the inter-confederation play-offs. UEFA were paired to face the AFC team by decision of the FIFA Executive Committee in October 1999, though the order of legs was decided by the draw on 31 August 2001. The team to meet an AFC team became the Republic of Ireland.

Team 1	Agg.	Team 2	1st leg	2nd leg
Republic of Ireland	2–1	Iran	2–0	0–1

== Qualified teams ==
The following 15 teams from UEFA qualified for the final tournament.

Team	Qualified as	Qualified on	Previous appearances in FIFA World Cup^{1}
France	Defending champions	12 July 1998	10 (1930, 1934, 1938, 1954, 1958, 1966, 1978, 1982, 1986, **1998**)
Russia	Group 1 winners	6 October 2001	8 (1958^{2}, 1962^{2}, 1966^{2}, 1970^{2}, 1982^{2}, 1986^{2}, 1990^{2}, 1994)
Portugal	Group 2 winners	6 October 2001	2 (1966, 1986)
Denmark	Group 3 winners	6 October 2001	2 (1986, 1998)
Sweden	Group 4 winners	5 September 2001	9 (1934, 1938, 1950, 1958, 1970, 1974, 1978, 1990, 1994)
Poland	Group 5 winners	1 September 2001	5 (1938, 1974, 1978, 1982, 1986)
Croatia	Group 6 winners	6 October 2001	1 (1998)
Spain	Group 7 winners	5 September 2001	10 (1934, 1950, 1962, 1966, 1978, 1982, 1986, 1990, 1994, 1998)
Italy	Group 8 winners	6 October 2001	14 (**1934**, **1938**, 1950, 1954, 1962, 1966, 1970, 1974, 1978, **1982**, 1986, 1990, 1994, 1998)
England	Group 9 winners	6 October 2001	10 (1950, 1954, 1958, 1962, **1966**, 1970, 1982, 1986, 1990, 1998)
Germany	Play-off winners	14 November 2001	14 (1934, 1938, **1954**^{3}, 1958^{3}, 1962^{3}, 1966^{3}, 1970^{3}, **1974**^{3}, 1978^{3}, 1982^{3}, 1986^{3}, **1990**^{3}, 1994, 1998)
Belgium	Play-off winners	14 November 2001	10 (1930, 1934, 1938, 1954, 1970, 1982, 1986, 1990, 1994, 1998)
Slovenia	Play-off winners	14 November 2001	0 (debut)
Turkey	Play-off winners	14 November 2001	1 (1954)
Republic of Ireland	UEFA-AFC play-off winners	15 November 2001	2 (1990, 1994)

^{1} Bold indicates champions for that year. Italic indicates hosts for that year.
^{2} Competed as Soviet Union.
^{3} Competed as West Germany. A separate team for East Germany also participated in qualifications during this time, having only competed in 1974.

== Top goalscorers ==
There were 677 goals scored in 238 matches, for an average of 2.84 goals per match.

10 goals

- (Ukraine) Andriy Shevchenko

9 goals

- (Denmark) Ebbe Sand

8 goals

- (Poland) Emmanuel Olisadebe
- (Portugal) Pauleta
- (Sweden) Henrik Larsson

7 goals

- (Belgium) Marc Wilmots
- (Italy) Filippo Inzaghi
- (Portugal) Nuno Gomes
- (Russia) Vladimir Beschastnykh
- (Switzerland) Kubilay Türkyilmaz

6 goals

- (Cyprus) Michalis Konstantinou
- (England) Michael Owen
- (Germany) Michael Ballack
- (Netherlands) Ruud Van Nistelrooy
- (Portugal) Luís Figo
- (Turkey) Hakan Şükür
- (Federal Republic of Yugoslavia) Savo Milošević

Below are full goalscorer lists for all groups and the play-offs:

- Group 1
- Group 2
- Group 3
- Group 4
- Group 5
- Group 6
- Group 7
- Group 8
- Group 9
- Play-offs
