= Kimiidera Park =

Stadium in Wakayama, Japan

Coordinates: 34°10′0.45″N 135°11′30.54″E

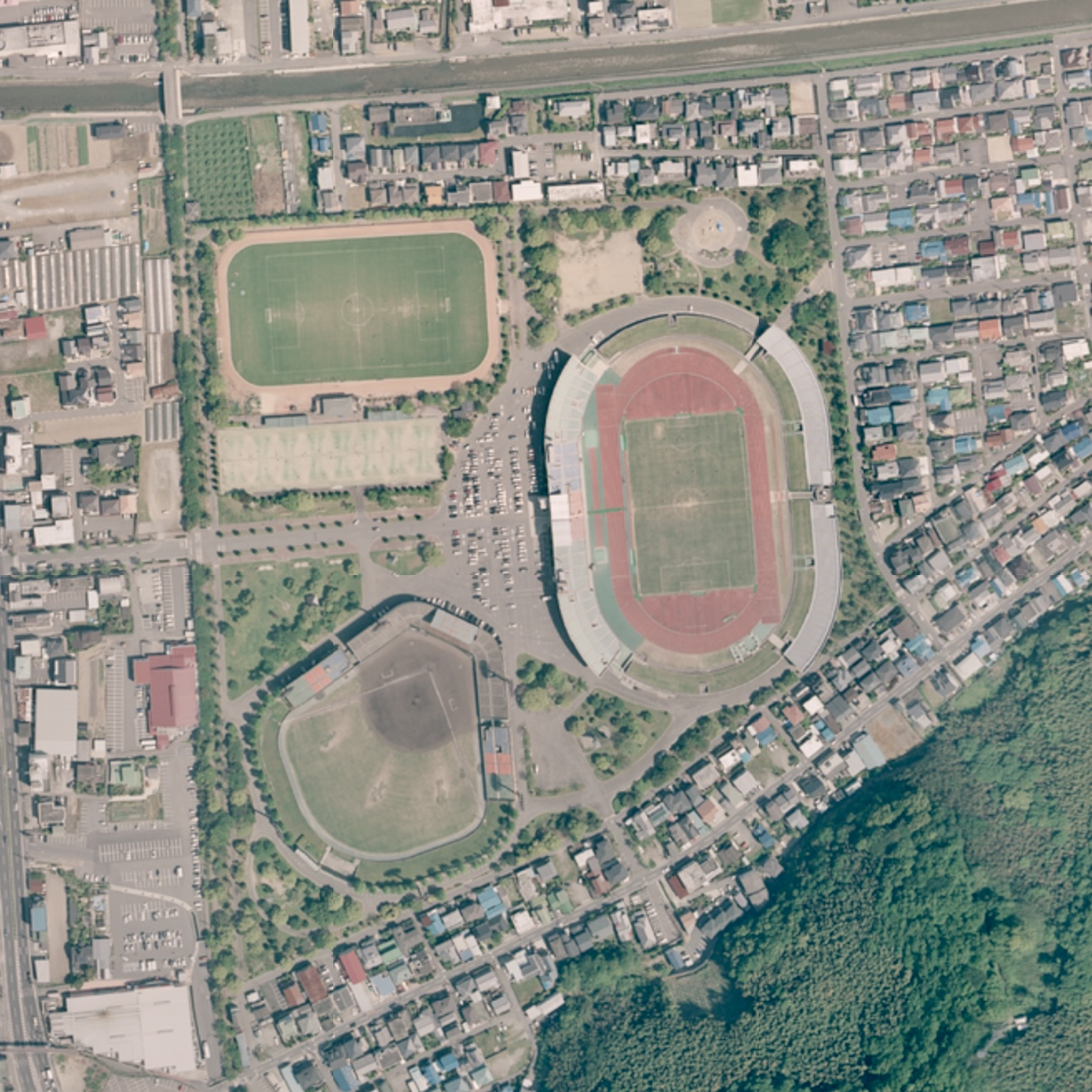
Aerial view of Kimiidera Park in 2008, showing (clockwise from top-left) the auxiliary field, athletics stadium, and baseball stadium

Kimiidera Park (Japanese: 紀三井寺公園, Hepburn: Kimiidera kōen) is a park and athletics facility in Wakayama, Wakayama Prefecture, Japan.

== Description ==
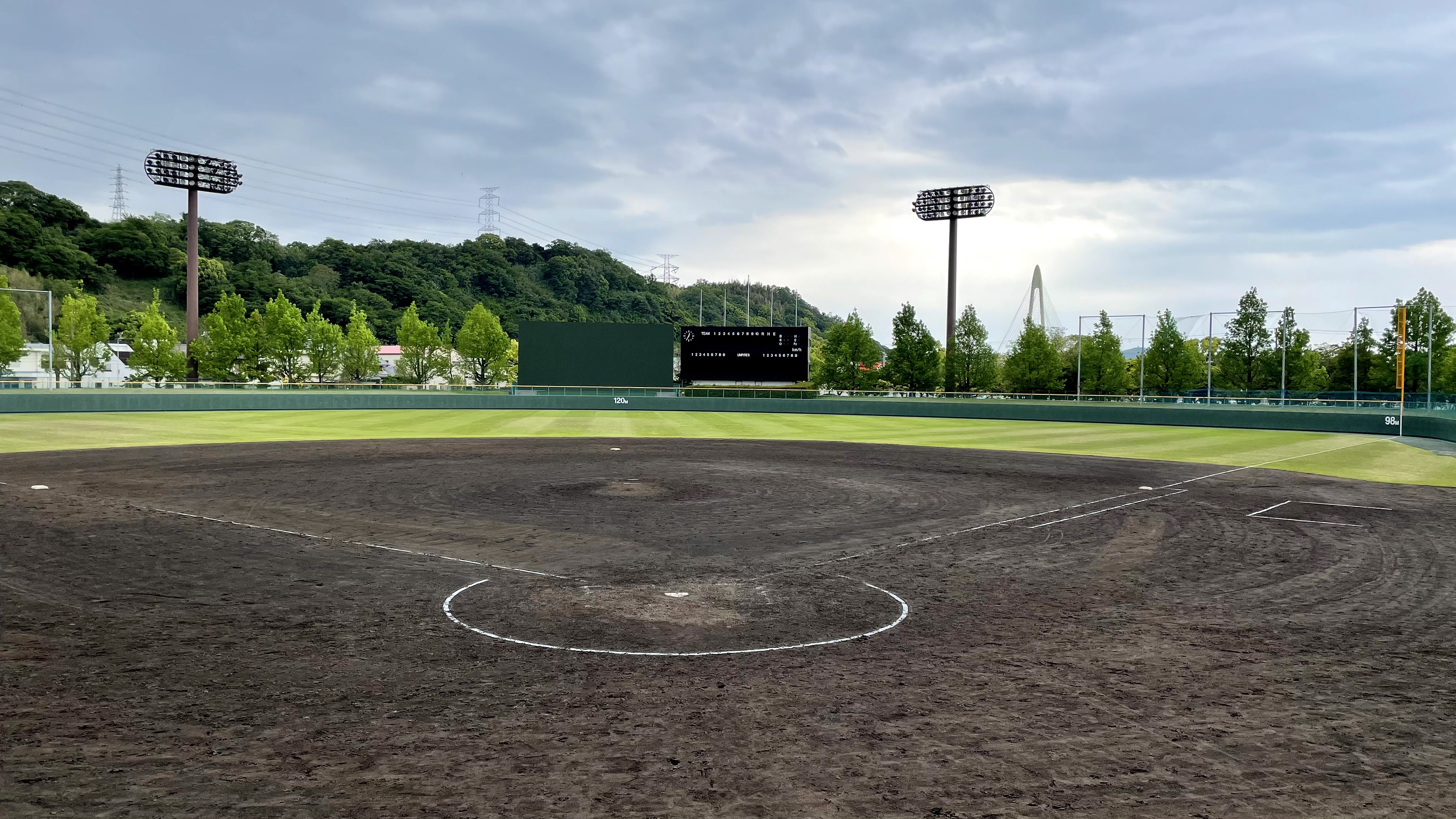
The stadium field in 2021

Kimiidera Park is a park and athletics facility in the city of Wakayama, in Wakayama Prefecture, Japan. It features an athletics stadium, baseball stadium, tennis courts, an auxiliary sports field, a climbing gym, and a children's playground. It has a total area of 172,300 m^{2} (42.6 acres).

=== Athletics stadium ===
Kimiidera Park Athletic Stadium (紀三井寺公園陸上競技場) is a mixed-use athletics stadium at the park. It measures 13,239 m^{2} (142,500 sq ft) and seats about 19,200 spectators. It features a 400 meter track. As the only major track and field stadium in the prefecture, it is used for various local and high school athletics events. It is also used for football and rugby events.

=== Baseball stadium ===
The Kimiidera Park Baseball Stadium (紀三井寺公園野球場) is the largest baseball stadium in Wakayama Prefecture. It has a total area of 6,775 m^{2} (72,930 sq ft).

A baseball field was laid down at the park in the 1940s. In 1965, the field was converted to a stadium to replace the previous prefectural baseball stadium, Muko-no-Shiba. The park's first Nippon Professional Baseball game was held in 1977, in a match between the Nankai Hawks and the Lotte Marines. Four more professional games were held at the park over the next decade, all hosted by the Nankai Hawks. Both the baseball stadium and athletics field saw major renovations in 2012. This saw addition of long plastic benches for spectators, replacing the previous concrete steps which were used as seating. Elevators were also added to the building.

Since 2024, it has been the home stadium of the Wakayama Waves of the Kansai Independent Baseball League. It is the main park used for amateur baseball events in the prefecture, and hosts the prefecture's tournaments for the National High School Baseball Championship.
