= Milan Baroš =

Czech footballer (born 1981)

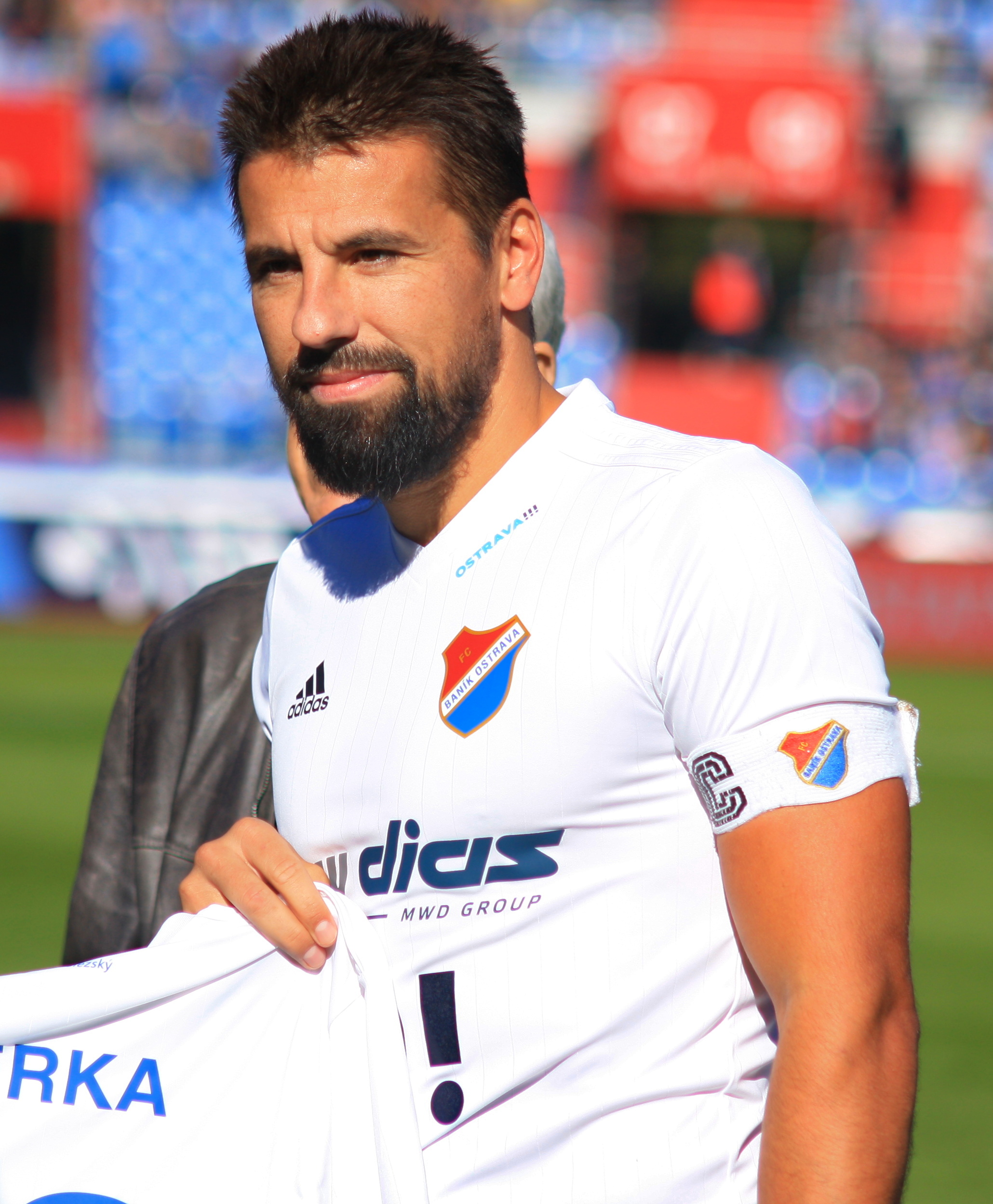
- Baroš with Baník Ostrava in 2018

Personal information
- Full name: Milan Baroš
- Date of birth: 28 October 1981 (age 45)
- Place of birth: Valašské Meziříčí, Czechoslovakia
- Height: 1.83 m (6 ft 0 in)
- Position: Forward

Youth career
- 1987–1991: Vigantice
- 1991–1993: Rožnov p. Radhoštěm
- 1993–1998: Baník Ostrava

Senior career*
Years	Team	Apps	(Gls)
1998–2001	Baník Ostrava	76	(22)
2001–2005	Liverpool	68	(19)
2005–2007	Aston Villa	42	(9)
2007–2008	Lyon	24	(7)
2008	→ Portsmouth (loan)	12	(0)
2008–2013	Galatasaray	93	(48)
2013	Baník Ostrava	12	(5)
2013–2014	Antalyaspor	13	(2)
2014–2015	Baník Ostrava	11	(2)
2015–2016	Mladá Boleslav	21	(6)
2016–2017	Slovan Liberec	24	(5)
2017–2020	Baník Ostrava	58	(16)
2020	Vigantice		
Total		454	(141)

International career
1996–1997	Czech Republic U15	7	(3)
1997–1998	Czech Republic U16	5	(1)
1998	Czech Republic U17	4	(1)
1998–2000	Czech Republic U18	19	(5)
1999–2002	Czech Republic U21	19	(9)
2001–2012	Czech Republic	93	(41)
Medal record
Men's football
Representing Czech Republic
UEFA European Championship
Bronze medal – third place	2004 Portugal
UEFA European Under-21 Championship
Winner	2002 Switzerland
- * Club domestic league appearances and goals

Milan Baroš (Czech pronunciation: [ˈmɪlan ˈbaroʃ]; born 28 October 1981) is a Czech former professional footballer who played as a forward.

In 2005, he was part of the Liverpool team which won the UEFA Champions League. He went on to win Ligue 1 with Lyon in 2007, the FA Cup with Portsmouth in 2008 and the Süper Lig with Galatasaray in 2012. He also had spells with Baník Ostrava, where he started his career, and English club Aston Villa, and retired from professional football in 2020 following his fourth spell at Baník Ostrava.

Born in Valašské Meziříčí, Baroš represented the Czech Republic national team in 93 matches, scoring on 41 occasions. He won the Golden Boot as top scorer of the Euro 2004 tournament, where his nation reached the semi-finals. He went on to play in three more major international tournaments. His 41 goals for the Czech Republic is second behind only Jan Koller.

== Club career ==
=== Early career ===
As a boy, Baroš played for youth clubs in Vigantice and Rožnov pod Radhoštěm before joining the youth team of Baník Ostrava at the age of 12. In 1998, he made his debut for the club in the Czech First League, the top division of Czech football, becoming a regular over the next few seasons. In 2000, he won the Talent of the Year award at the Czech Footballer of the Year awards. He was described by the Czech News Agency in the 2000–01 season as "perhaps the biggest star of the [Czech] football league". He played his last game for the club on 2 December 2001, in a 1–0 loss at Viktoria Žižkov. During his time in Ostrava, he scored 23 league goals in 76 appearances.

=== Liverpool ===
Baroš joined Liverpool in July 2001 for an undisclosed fee and on a contract of undisclosed length; he joined compatriots Patrik Berger and Vladimír Šmicer at the club. The BBC estimated his transfer fee as £3.2 million. He did not move to England straight away due to delays in obtaining a work permit, which was obtained in December. He made his club debut in a UEFA Champions League tie away to Barcelona on 13 March 2002; he played the last 16 minutes in place of Emile Heskey as the match finished goalless. It was his only appearance of the 2001–02 season.

In the 2002–03 season, Baroš scored twice on his Premiership debut away to Bolton Wanderers on 14 September 2002, as Liverpool won 3–2 away. Baroš was a substitute in the 2003 Football League Cup Final against Manchester United. He entered the game in the second half, but did not play to the end of the game, being substituted himself a minute before the end of the game. Liverpool won the game 2–0 to win the cup, the first major trophy of Baroš' career. Towards the end of the season, he scored twice in a 6–0 away win over already-relegated West Bromwich Albion in April 2003. He ended his first season in the Premiership with 12 goals for the club.

Baroš broke his ankle in a September 2003 match against Blackburn Rovers, a match which also saw teammate Jamie Carragher sustain a broken leg. Baroš subsequently missed five months of football and scored just two goals in the 2003–04 season. His first goal came in a league match against Leeds United in February 2004, while his other goal was in March in a 1–1 Champions League draw against Marseille. Baroš would later claim that had manager Gérard Houllier stayed at the club after the summer of 2004, he would have put in a transfer request. As it was, Houllier left the club and was replaced by Rafael Benítez.

Baroš entered the 2004–05 season having been the top goalscorer in the summer's Euro 2004 tournament. With Michael Owen and Emile Heskey having been sold and new signing Djibril Cissé out with a long-term injury, Baroš was now Liverpool's only senior striker. Despite being the club's joint top scorer with 13 goals, including a hat-trick against Crystal Palace, Spaniard Fernando Morientes was preferred to Baroš in Liverpool's starting lineup for the League Cup Final, a match they lost to Chelsea. However, he did start the 2005 Champions League Final, being substituted after 85 minutes as the game finished 3–3 in normal time. Liverpool went on to win the match on penalties. Baroš reportedly dropped the trophy during the team's celebration, leaving a dent, but Liverpool decided not to mend it because it "added to the character" of the trophy. He finished the season with 13 goals, becoming the joint-top scorer for the club. Baroš also received his first red card during the campaign, being sent off for a high challenge on Everton's Alan Stubbs in the Merseyside derby on 20 March.

In June 2005, former manager Gérard Houllier, then with French club Lyon, made an approach to sign Baroš. The player rejected the approach, but only made two substitute appearances for Liverpool in the 2005–06 season before leaving the club. He left Liverpool with league figures of 19 goals in 68 appearances.

=== Aston Villa ===
Baroš moved to Premiership side Aston Villa for a fee of £6.5 million in August 2005, signing a four-year contract. He was given the number 10 shirt. Just ten minutes into his Aston Villa debut, he scored the only goal in his new team's league victory over Blackburn. He played a crucial role in Villa's League Cup second round victory against Wycombe Wanderers in September. With Villa trailing 3–1 at half time, Baroš scored shortly after the beginning of the second half and won a penalty, which Gareth Barry converted. He also provided the cross for Barry's second goal of the game as Villa scored seven goals in the second half, resulting in a final score of 8–3, their biggest win in over 40 years. He set up the first Aston Villa goal in a November match against Sunderland in dubious circumstances; back-heeling the ball, which "looked to have gone out of play" to Aaron Hughes. Hughes' pass found Kevin Phillips, who opened the scoring against his old club. He later scored a goal himself in the same game, which ended 3–1 to Villa.

In the Boxing Day match against Everton, Baroš was involved thoroughly in the proceedings. He opened the scoring in the 35th minute, having handled the ball immediately beforehand. This was not punished and the referee awarded a goal. Baroš subsequently celebrated in front of the travelling Everton fans, making a gesture as if to listen to them. A number of missiles from the crowd were subsequently thrown in Baroš' direction. The goal was just his third in what Glenn Moore of The Independent described as "an indifferent season" for Baroš. He went on to score his second goal of the game, and Villa's fourth, earning him man of the match honours. Baroš scored twice in January 2006's fourth round FA Cup win against Port Vale, and added another in the following round's 1–1 draw with Manchester City. Late in the season, he scored two goals in the Second City derby against Birmingham City at Villa Park, marking his 11th and 12th goals of the season and winning another man of the match award. He would score no further goals that season.

Baroš failed to score at the start of the 2006–07 season, leading new manager Martin O'Neill to challenge him in October to prove himself before the January transfer window. He subsequently scored his first goal of the season in December 2006, eight months since scoring his last one, with a close-range equaliser against Sheffield United in a 2–2 draw. Although he also managed to score for Aston Villa in a 2–1 loss to Manchester United in the FA Cup, he left the club in January 2007, having scored just once in 17 league matches that season.

=== Lyon ===
On 22 January 2007, Baroš signed with French side Lyon, signing a three-and-a-half-year contract and reuniting with former manager Gérard Houllier from his time at Liverpool. The deal swapped Baroš with Lyon striker John Carew, who joined Aston Villa on a three-and-a-half-year deal. Just two days after joining the club, he made his Lyon debut in a league match against Bordeaux. He appeared as a substitute, as league leaders Lyon lost 2–1 for their first home defeat of the season. Baroš took part in that year's Champions League, featuring as a substitute in a 0–0 draw in Rome against Roma. He played no further part in that season's Champions League campaign, as he remained on the bench in the return leg as Lyon were eliminated.

In May 2007, Baroš was accused of making a racist gesture towards his Cameroonian opponent Stéphane Mbia during Lyon's match against Rennes on 18 April. After having been fouled by Mbia several times, Baroš held his nose in front of Mbia and waved his hand as if to waft away an unpleasant smell. In the ensuing controversy, Baroš insisted that his gesture was not intended to be racist in any way, and he was only trying to tell Mbia to get out of his face and leave him alone. Baroš and Mbia were brought before an official disciplinary hearing of the Ligue de Football Professionnel (LFP), which ruled that Baroš was innocent of racist behaviour, but he was nevertheless suspended for the remaining three games of the season for unsportsmanlike conduct. The end of the season saw Lyon win the league title, but nonetheless manager Houllier left the club.

Baroš scored in Lyon's opening game of the 2007–08 season as his club won 2–0 against Auxerre. However, he played significantly less under new manager Alain Perrin, making just six starts and scoring a total of three league goals. In mid-November, Baroš revealed a break down in his relationship with Perrin and hinted at a move to another club.

=== Portsmouth ===
Baroš joined Premier League side Portsmouth on loan from Lyon in January 2008 until the end of the season, with the option of making the move permanent at the end of the loan. Baroš played a significant role in the club winning the 2008 FA Cup. He won Portsmouth's match-winning penalty kick in the quarter-final at Manchester United and assisted Nwankwo Kanu's deciding goal in the semi-final match against West Bromwich Albion with a suspected handball that went unnoticed by both the referee and his assistant. The final match of Baroš' loan spell was the 2008 FA Cup Final victory over Cardiff City at Wembley Stadium, where he appeared as an 87th-minute substitute for Kanu. By the end of the season, Baroš had played 16 matches for Portsmouth, including seven as a substitute, although he failed to score. He was one of a number of Portsmouth players to be absent at the team parade after the club won the FA Cup, leading to speculation he could have played his last game for the club. At the end of the season, Baroš returned to Lyon.

=== Galatasaray ===
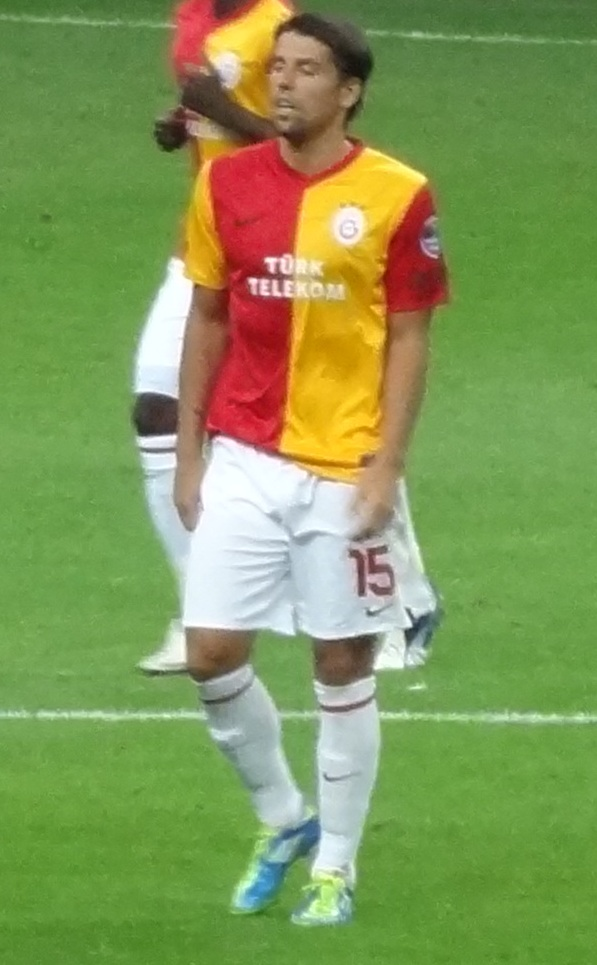
Baroš playing for Galatasaray in 2011

In August 2008, Baroš joined Turkish champions Galatasaray from Lyon for a fee of €4.7 million. He made his first appearance against Kayserispor, playing the last 15 minutes. Baroš scored his first two goals for the club in the UEFA Cup first round, first leg game against Bellinzona. Three days later, in his first league start, he once again scored two goals against Kocaelispor, with Galatasaray going on to win the match 4–1. On 21 December 2008, Baroš scored a hat-trick in the 4–2 Süper Lig derby win against Beşiktaş, converting two penalties and scoring one from open play. He scored another hat-trick later in the season against Hacettepe. He finished the 2008–09 season as the Süper Lig top scorer with 20 goals.

Baroš scored his first goal of the 2009–10 season in his third league game when he scored twice in a 4–1 win against Kayserispor. His next two goals came on 13 September where Galatasaray played rivals Beşiktaş. Galatasaray won the match 3–0, with Baroš scoring his third and fourth goals of the season. He scored a total of five times in ten matches before breaking his left foot in two places after a tackle by Emre Belözoğlu in the Fenerbahçe–Galatasaray derby on 25 October 2009. He returned to action four and a half months later on 14 March 2010 for a game against Ankaragücü, scoring a goal on his comeback. During the season, he scored his third hat-trick for the club in a match against Diyarbakirspor. He finished the season with league figures of 11 goals in 17 matches.

In August 2010, a week before the start of the 2010–11 Süper Lig, he extended his contract with Galatasaray for two seasons, keeping him contracted to the club until the end of the 2012–13 season. Although he had been injured during pre-season training, Baroš appeared as a substitute in his club's UEFA Europa League qualification match against Karpaty Lviv, scoring twice as Galatasaray returned from 2–0 down to draw the match. At the end of September, he scored his fourth hat-trick for the club against Istanbul Büyükşehir Belediyespor, although he failed to complete the game due to an injury. He scored two more goals in a 4–2 loss against Ankaragücü on 17 October, but was injured again. Baroš was suspended for three matches in March 2011 after insulting referee Fırat Aydınus in a match against Beşiktaş. By the end of the season, Baroš had appeared in 17 league games and scored 9 goals.

Galatasaray started the 2011–12 season well and were top of the league in January, having won eight consecutive league matches. Baroš did not start a match for his club for four weeks, but scored an important goal against Samsunspor in the eighth match of the streak. The club won a ninth-straight game, with Baroš scoring his seventh goal of the season, in the 5–1 win against Kardemir Karabükspor, although he left the game with an injury. He returned from injury in a February match against Antalyaspor, coming on as a substitute, but was on the field of play just 15 minutes before receiving a red card. His dismissal resulted in a three-match suspension. Baroš scored his last goal for the club in April 2012 in the last match of the regular season against Manisaspor.

In 2012, Baroš was told by then-coach Fatih Terim that he would not play for the club any more. He played no competitive football after Euro 2012 and finally left the club in February 2013.

=== Return to Baník Ostrava ===
On 18 February 2013, Czech club Baník Ostrava announced that Baroš had rejoined the club where he started his career, signing a one-and-a-half-year contract. Under the terms of the contract, his salary was donated to support the youth club of the team. Having not played a competitive match since 21 June of the previous year, he played his first match of the season on 23 February, coming on as a substitute in the 0–0 home draw with Dynamo České Budějovice. He scored a hat-trick in Ostrava's 3–0 league victory against Hradec Králové on 9 March 2013, his first hat-trick in the top flight of Czech football.

=== Antalyaspor ===
On 16 July 2013, Baroš agreed a one-year contract with Turkish club Antalyaspor. He made his club debut in August, appearing as a substitute in a 0–0 Süper Lig draw against Kayseri Erciyesspor. He scored his first goal for Antalyaspor against Bursaspor in August, then his second against Rizespor in October. He suffered damage to his anterior cruciate ligament (ACL) in December 2013, ruling him out of action for the rest of the season. Baroš returned to the Czech Republic for treatment in January 2014.

=== Return to the Czech league ===
On 24 September 2014, Baroš re-joined Ostrava, signing a contract until the end of the 2014–15 season. Following the end of the 2014–15 season, Baroš left Ostrava and signed a two-year contract with Mladá Boleslav. Following the end of the 2015–16 season, Baroš left Mladá Boleslav and signed a two-year contract with Slovan Liberec. He only spent one of the two years at Liberec before returning to Baník Ostrava in 2017. On 3 July 2020, 38-year-old Baroš announced that he would retire from professional football at the end of the Czech season, due to persistent injuries. The club retired the number 27 shirt that he had worn, in tribute.

Later that year, he joined his boyhood club Vigantice in the lower-league divisions.

== International career ==
=== Youth and early senior careers ===
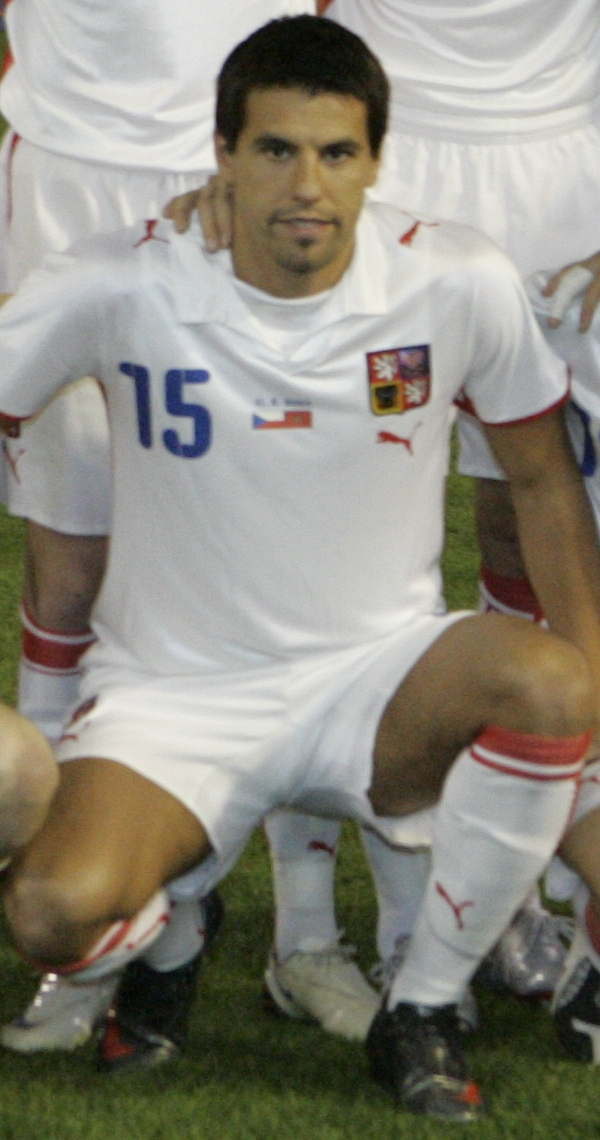
Baroš posing for a team photo before an international match in 2009

Baroš represented various Czech Republic youth teams ranging from under-15 until under-18. He played in the 2000 Summer Olympics, making three appearances for the team. Baroš took part in two other major tournaments at junior level: the 2000 UEFA European Under-21 Championship where Czech Republic placed second, and the 2002 UEFA European Under-21 Championship, which the Czechs won.

Baroš debuted for the Czech senior squad on 25 April 2001 in a friendly match against Belgium whilst scoring his first goal as well. He and national teammate Pavel Nedvěd were both shown the red card in a November 2001 qualification match for the following year's World Cup, as the Czech Republic were eliminated by Belgium.

=== UEFA Euro 2004 ===
At UEFA Euro 2004, Baroš scored the first goal for the Czech Republic in their first game of the tournament, a come-from-behind 2–1 victory over Latvia. With the goal he became the youngest goalscorer at the European Championships for the Czech Republic. His second goal of the tournament came against the Netherlands; the Dutch team had taken a two-goal lead over the Czechs before Jan Koller scored from a Baroš pass. Baroš then scored before Vladimír Šmicer completed the scoring, as the Czechs won the game 3–2. The third group match saw the Czech Republic make nine changes to their starting lineup, having already qualified for the quarter-finals. Baroš appeared as a substitute and scored the winning goal, as opponents Germany failed to advance to the next stage of the tournament. Baroš added two goals in two minutes of the second half of the Czechs' quarter-final win over Denmark, and finished as the tournament's Golden Boot winner with five goals.

=== 2006 FIFA World Cup ===
In qualification for the 2006 World Cup, Baroš scored five goals for his country, including four in consecutive matches in 2005. An injury to his foot, picked up in a match on 3 June, kept him out of 2006 FIFA World Cup games against the United States and Ghana. He appeared in the Czechs' final group game against Italy, but appeared unfit and left the game after 64 minutes to be replaced by David Jarolím.

=== UEFA Euro 2008 and suspension ===
In the run up to UEFA Euro 2008, Baroš had not scored an international goal since March 2007. He started the Czech Republic's second group game against Portugal, but Portugal won 3–1 and Baroš failed to score. Jan Koller was preferred to Baroš in the starting lineup for the next match, against Turkey. Despite neither playing in the match nor even being on the pitch, Baroš suffered the indignity of receiving a yellow card during stoppage time at the end of the match.

Baroš was banned indefinitely from playing for his national side in April 2009 after a breach of discipline, having attended a bar late at night. However, he was recalled to the national side after the appointment of Ivan Hašek as head coach.

=== National team comeback and retirement ===
On 12 August 2009, Baroš marked his national team return with a goal from the penalty spot in the 3–1 home friendly victory against Belgium. The following month, Baroš scored a career high of four goals against San Marino, in a World Cup qualifier which the Czech Republic won 7–0. By doing so, he became only the second player from the Czech Republic to score four goals in an international match.

After the tournament, during which he failed to score, Baroš announced his retirement from international football, having scored a total of 41 international goals in 93 matches. His total of 41 international goals for his country is second only to strike partner Jan Koller, who holds the record with 55.

== Style of play ==
Baroš gained the nickname "the Ostravan Maradona" in his native Czech Republic due to perceived similarities with the Argentine footballer of the same name. He was noted particularly for being a quick player with good dribbling skill.

== Personal life ==
Baroš was born in the Czech town of Valašské Meziříčí. He is of partial Vlach and Romani descent. He grew up in the village of Vigantice. In 2009, he married Tereza Franková, whom he started dating in 2005. Their son Patrik was born on 2 September 2009 and their second son Matteo was born on 1 November 2011. They split in 2024.

On 1 November 2007, Baroš was arrested in France while driving at 271 km/h (168 mph) in his black Ferrari F430, on a freeway limited to 130 km/h (81 mph). Stopped by French police between Lyon and Geneva in the region of Ain, the local authorities said the radar reading of 271 km/h was the fastest speed ever recorded in the region, surpassing the previous mark of 248 km/h (154 mph) set by a motorcyclist in 2000. As a result, Baroš had his car and licence confiscated and had to return to Lyon in a taxi.

== Career statistics ==
=== Club ===
Source: League matches;
Cup and League Cup matches;
Liverpool European matches;
European club matches from 2006

Appearances and goals by club, season and competition
Club	Season	League			National cup (Note: Includes Czech Cup, FA Cup, Coupe de France, Turkish Cup)		League cup (Note: Includes Football League Cup, Coupe de la Ligue)		Europe		Other		Total	
Club	Season	Division	Apps	Goals	Apps	Goals	Apps	Goals	Apps	Goals	Apps	Goals	Apps	Goals
Baník Ostrava	1998–99	Czech First League	6	0	0	0	—		—		—		6	0
Baník Ostrava	1999–2000	Czech First League	29	6	2	1	—		—		—		29	6
Baník Ostrava	2000–01	Czech First League	26	5	2	0	—		—		—		26	5
Baník Ostrava	2001–02	Czech First League	15	11	0	0	—		—		—		15	11
Baník Ostrava	Total		76	22	4	1	—		—		—		76	23
Liverpool	2001–02	Premier League	0	0	0	0	0	0	1	0	—		1	0
Liverpool	2002–03	Premier League	27	9	1	0	4	2	9	1	1 (Note: Appearance in FA Community Shield)	0	42	12
Liverpool	2003–04	Premier League	13	1	1	0	0	0	4 (Note: Appearances in UEFA Cup)	1	—		18	2
Liverpool	2004–05	Premier League	26	9	1	0	4	2	14 (Note: Appearances in UEFA Champions League)	2	—		45	13
Liverpool	2005–06	Premier League	2	0	0	0	0	0	0	0	0	0	2	0
Liverpool	Total		68	19	3	0	8	4	28	4	1	0	108	27
Aston Villa	2005–06	Premier League	25	8	3	3	2	1	—		—		30	12
Aston Villa	2006–07	Premier League	17	1	1	1	3	0	—		—		21	2
Aston Villa	Total		42	9	4	4	5	1	—		—		51	14
Lyon	2006–07	Ligue 1	12	4	0	0	1	0	1	0	0	0	14	4
Lyon	2007–08	Ligue 1	12	3	1	0	1	0	3	0	1 (Note: Appearance in Trophée des Champions)	0	18	3
Lyon	2008–09	Ligue 1	0	0	0	0	0	0	0	0	1	0	1	0
Lyon	Total		24	7	1	0	2	0	4	0	2	0	33	7
Portsmouth (loan)	2007–08	Premier League	12	0	4	0	0	0	—		—		16	0
Galatasaray	2008–09	Süper Lig	31	20	3	1	—		9	5	—		43	26
Galatasaray	2009–10	Süper Lig	17	11	0	0	—		6 (Note: Appearances in UEFA Europa League)	5	—		23	16
Galatasaray	2010–11	Süper Lig	17	9	2	0	—		2	2	—		21	11
Galatasaray	2011–12	Süper Lig	28	8	1	0	—		—		—		29	8
Galatasaray	Total		93	48	6	1	—		17	12	—		116	61
Baník Ostrava	2012–13	Czech First League	12	5	0	0	—		—		—		12	5
Antalyaspor	2013–14	Süper Lig	13	2	3	2	—		—		—		16	4
Baník Ostrava	2014–15	Czech First League	11	2	0	0	—		—		—		11	2
FK Mladá Boleslav	2015–16	Czech First League	21	6	3	3	—		0	0	—		24	9
Slovan Liberec	2016–17	Czech First League	24	5	0	0	—		5	1	—		29	6
Baník Ostrava	2017–18	Czech First League	25	9	2	1	—		—		—		27	10
Baník Ostrava	2018–19	Czech First League	16	6	1	1	—		—		1 (Note: Appearance in Czech First League UEFA Europa League play-offs)	0	18	7
Baník Ostrava	2019–20	Czech First League	17	1	2	2	—		—		—		19	3
Baník Ostrava	Total		58	16	5	4	—		—		1	0	64	20
Career total			454	141	33	15	15	5	54	17	4	0	556	177

=== International ===
Appearances and goals by national team and year
National team	Year	Apps	Goals
Czech Republic	2001	8	4
Czech Republic	2002	6	4
Czech Republic	2003	7	4
Czech Republic	2004	13	9
Czech Republic	2005	11	5
Czech Republic	2006	8	4
Czech Republic	2007	8	1
Czech Republic	2008	9	1
Czech Republic	2009	8	6
Czech Republic	2010	1	0
Czech Republic	2011	7	1
Czech Republic	2012	7	2
Total		93	41

Baroš made his debut opposed to Belgium in April 2001, netting his first goal as the match ended in a 1–1 draw. Baroš has only scored a hat-trick once, which came against San Marino in a 2010 FIFA World Cup qualification match in September 2009, where he accomplished a career mark by scoring four times.

Scores and results list the Czech Republic's goal tally first, score column indicates score after each Baroš goal.

List of international goals scored by Milan Baroš
No.	Date	Venue	Opponent	Score	Result	Competition	Ref.
1	25 April 2001	Letná Stadium, Prague, Czech Republic	Belgium	1–1	1–1	Friendly	
2	6 June 2001	Na Stínadlech, Teplice, Czech Republic	Northern Ireland	3–1	3–1	2002 FIFA World Cup qualification	
3	5 September 2001	Na Stínadlech, Teplice, Czech Republic	Malta	3–2	3–2	2002 FIFA World Cup qualification	
4	6 October 2001	Letná Stadium, Prague, Czech Republic	Bulgaria	3–0	6–0	2002 FIFA World Cup qualification	
5	6 September 2002	Letná Stadium, Prague, Czech Republic	FR Yugoslavia	3–0	5–0	Friendly	
6	6 September 2002	Letná Stadium, Prague, Czech Republic	FR Yugoslavia	5–0	5–0	Friendly	
7	16 October 2002	Na Stínadlech, Teplice, Czech Republic	Belarus	2–0	2–0	UEFA Euro 2004 qualifying	
8	20 November 2002	Na Stínadlech, Teplice, Czech Republic	Sweden	3–2	3–3	Friendly	
9	12 February 2003	Stade de France, Saint-Denis, France	France	2–0	2–0	Friendly	
10	30 April 2003	Na Stínadlech, Teplice, Czech Republic	Turkey	4–0	4–0	Friendly	
11	6 September 2003	Dinamo Stadium, Minsk, Belarus	Belarus	2–1	3–1	UEFA Euro 2004 qualifying	
12	10 September 2003	Toyota Arena, Prague, Czech Republic	Netherlands	3–1	3–1	UEFA Euro 2004 qualifying	
13	31 March 2004	Lansdowne Road, Dublin, Republic of Ireland	Republic of Ireland	1–1	1–2	Friendly	
14	2 June 2004	Toyota Arena, Prague, Czech Republic	Bulgaria	1–0	3–1	Friendly	
15	6 June 2004	Na Stínadlech, Teplice, Czech Republic	Estonia	1–0	2–0	Friendly	
16	6 June 2004	Na Stínadlech, Teplice, Czech Republic	Estonia	2–0	2–0	Friendly	
17	15 June 2004	Estádio Municipal de Aveiro, Aveiro, Portugal	Latvia	1–1	2–1	UEFA Euro 2004	
18	19 June 2004	Estádio Municipal de Aveiro, Aveiro, Portugal	Netherlands	2–2	3–2	UEFA Euro 2004	
19	23 June 2004	Estádio José Alvalade, Lisbon, Portugal	Germany	2–1	2–1	UEFA Euro 2004	
20	27 June 2004	Estádio do Dragão, Porto, Portugal	Denmark	2–0	3–0	UEFA Euro 2004	
21	27 June 2004	Estádio do Dragão, Porto, Portugal	Denmark	3–0	3–0	UEFA Euro 2004	
22	26 March 2005	Na Stínadlech, Teplice, Czech Republic	Finland	1–0	4–3	2006 FIFA World Cup qualification	
23	30 March 2005	Estadi Comunal d'Aixovall, Andorra la Vella, Andorra	Andorra	2–0	4–0	2006 FIFA World Cup qualification	
24	4 June 2005	Stadion u Nisy, Liberec, Czech Republic	Andorra	5–1	8–1	2006 FIFA World Cup qualification	
25	8 June 2005	Na Stínadlech, Teplice, Czech Republic	Macedonia	6–1	6–1	2006 FIFA World Cup qualification	
26	7 September 2005	Andrův stadion, Olomouc, Czech Republic	Armenia	3–0	4–1	2006 FIFA World Cup qualification	
27	26 May 2006	Tivoli-Neu, Innsbruck, Austria	Saudi Arabia	1–0	2–0	Friendly	
28	7 October 2006	Stadion u Nisy, Liberec, Czech Republic	San Marino	3–0	7–0	UEFA Euro 2008 qualifying	
29	7 October 2006	Stadion u Nisy, Liberec, Czech Republic	San Marino	7–0	7–0	UEFA Euro 2008 qualifying	
30	15 November 2006	Toyota Arena, Prague, Czech Republic	Denmark	1–1	1–1	Friendly	
31	24 March 2007	Toyota Arena, Prague, Czech Republic	Germany	1–2	1–2	UEFA Euro 2008 qualifying	
32	20 August 2008	Wembley Stadium, London, England	England	1–0	2–2	Friendly	
33	12 August 2009	Na Stínadlech, Teplice, Czech Republic	Belgium	2–1	3–1	Friendly	
34	5 September 2009	Tehelné pole, Bratislava, Slovakia	Slovakia	2–2	2–2	2010 FIFA World Cup qualification	
35	9 September 2009	Městský fotbalový stadion, Uherské Hradiště, Czech Republic	San Marino	1–0	7–0	2010 FIFA World Cup qualification	
36	9 September 2009	Městský fotbalový stadion, Uherské Hradiště, Czech Republic	San Marino	2–0	7–0	2010 FIFA World Cup qualification	
37	9 September 2009	Městský fotbalový stadion, Uherské Hradiště, Czech Republic	San Marino	3–0	7–0	2010 FIFA World Cup qualification	
38	9 September 2009	Městský fotbalový stadion, Uherské Hradiště, Czech Republic	San Marino	5–0	7–0	2010 FIFA World Cup qualification	
39	29 March 2011	Stadion Střelecký ostrov, České Budějovice, Czech Republic	Liechtenstein	1–0	2–0	UEFA Euro 2012 qualifying	
40	29 February 2012	Aviva Stadium, Dublin, Republic of Ireland	Republic of Ireland	1–0	1–1	Friendly	
41	26 May 2012	Profertil Arena, Hartberg, Austria	Israel	1–0	2–1	Friendly	

== Honours ==
Liverpool

- Football League Cup: 2002–03; runner-up: 2004–05
- UEFA Champions League: 2004–05

Olympique Lyon

- Ligue 1: 2006–07, 2007–08
- Trophée des Champions: 2007

Portsmouth

- FA Cup: 2007–08

Galatasaray

- Süper Lig: 2011–12

Mladá Boleslav

- Czech Cup: 2015–16

Czech Republic U21

- UEFA European Under-21 Championship: 2002

Individual

- UEFA European Championship Golden Boot: 2004
- UEFA European Champions Team of the Tournament: 2004
- Süper Lig top scorer: 2008–09
