= 2002 FIFA World Cup qualification – UEFA Group 8 =

Football tournament qualification stage

The five teams in this group played against each other on a home-and-away basis. The group winner Italy qualified for the 17th FIFA World Cup held in South Korea and Japan. The runner-up Romania advanced to the UEFA Play-off and played against Slovenia. Italy conceded two unexpected draws against the lowest-ranked sides in the group, but won the big matches comfortably, and were established as group winners long before the end of the campaign. Romania lost both games against Italy but had five wins out of six in the other matches, and second place was likewise ensured early.

== Standings ==
Pos	Team	Pld	W	D	L	GF	GA	GD	Pts	Qualification	Italy national football team	Romania national football team	Georgia national football team	Hungary national football team	Lithuania national football team
1	Italy	8	6	2	0	16	3	+13	20	Qualification to 2002 FIFA World Cup	—	3–0	2–0	1–0	4–0
2	Romania	8	5	1	2	10	7	+3	16	Advance to UEFA play-offs	0–2	—	1–1	2–0	1–0
3	Georgia	8	3	1	4	12	12	0	10		1–2	0–2	—	3–1	2–0
4	Hungary	8	2	2	4	14	13	+1	8		2–2	0–2	4–1	—	1–1
5	Lithuania	8	0	2	6	3	20	−17	2		0–0	1–2	0–4	1–6	—

== Matches ==
3 September 2000

Hungary	2–2	Italy
Horváth 29', 78'	Report	Inzaghi 26', 35'

Népstadion, Budapest
Attendance: 57,000
Referee: Graham Barber (England)
3 September 2000

Romania	1–0	Lithuania
Ganea 89'	Report

Stadionul Steaua, Bucharest
Attendance: 3,000
Referee: Morgan Norman (Sweden)

7 October 2000

Italy	3–0	Romania
Inzaghi 13'; Delvecchio 17'; Totti 42'	Report

Stadio Giuseppe Meazza, Milan
Attendance: 54,297
Referee: Jan Wegereef (Netherlands)
7 October 2000

Lithuania	0–4	Georgia
	Report	Ketsbaia 19', 35'; Kinkladze 46'; A. Arveladze 84'

Darius and Girėnas Stadium, Kaunas
Attendance: 2,317
Referee: Ryszard Wójcik (Poland)

11 October 2000

Italy	2–0	Georgia
Del Piero 47' (pen.), 87' (pen.)	Report

Stadio del Conero, Ancona
Attendance: 26,000
Referee: Karl-Erik Nilsson (Sweden)
11 October 2000

Lithuania	1–6	Hungary
Buitkus 71'	Report	Illés 25'; M. Fehér 36', 61', 72'; Horváth 67'; Lisztes 84'

Darius and Girėnas Stadium, Kaunas
Attendance: 498
Referee: Orhan Erdemir (Turkey)

24 March 2001

Romania	0–2	Italy
	Report	Inzaghi 29', 33'

Stadionul Steaua, Bucharest
Attendance: 24,000
Referee: Herbert Fandel (Germany)
24 March 2001

Hungary	1–1	Lithuania
V. Sebők 70' (pen.)	Report	Ražanauskas 74'

Népstadion, Budapest
Attendance: 15,200
Referee: Vasiliy Melnichuk (Ukraine)

28 March 2001

Italy	4–0	Lithuania
Inzaghi 17', 64'; Del Piero 49', 79'	Report

Stadio Nereo Rocco, Trieste
Attendance: 14,800
Referee: Sergei Shmolik (Belarus)
28 March 2001

Georgia	0–2	Romania
	Report	D. Munteanu 69'; Contra 80'

Boris Paichadze National Stadium, Tbilisi
Attendance: 27,000
Referee: Rune Pedersen (Norway)

2 June 2001

Georgia	1–2	Italy
Gakhokidze 80'	Report	Delvecchio 45'; Totti 66'

Boris Paichadze National Stadium, Tbilisi
Attendance: 28,000
Referee: Eduardo Iturralde González (Spain)
2 June 2001

Romania	2–0	Hungary
M. Niculae 5', 54'	Report

Stadionul Steaua, Bucharest
Attendance: 20,526
Referee: Éric Poulat (France)

6 June 2001

Lithuania	1–2	Romania
Fomenka 86'	Report	A. Ilie 31'; V. Moldovan 49'

Darius and Girėnas Stadium, Kaunas
Attendance: 4,900
Referee: Anton Stredak (Slovakia)
6 June 2001

Hungary	4–1	Georgia
Mátyus 40'; V. Sebők 45' (pen.); A. Korsós 55', 62'	Report	Kobiashvili 77'

Népstadion, Budapest
Attendance: 7,325
Referee: Hartmut Strampe (Germany)

1 September 2001

Lithuania	0–0	Italy
	Report

Darius and Girėnas Stadium, Kaunas
Attendance: 7,000
Referee: Mario van der Ende (Netherlands)
1 September 2001

Georgia	3–1	Hungary
S. Arveladze 32'; Jamarauli 53'; Iashvili 64'	Report	Mátyus 43'

Lokomotiv Stadium, Tbilisi
Attendance: 8,000
Referee: Drago Kos (Slovenia)

5 September 2001

Hungary	0–2	Romania
	Report	A. Ilie 11'; M. Niculae 27'

Népstadion, Budapest
Attendance: 6,000
Referee: Hugh Dallas (Scotland)
5 September 2001

Georgia	2–0	Lithuania
Iashvili 81', 83'	Report

Lokomotiv Stadium, Tbilisi
Attendance: 15,000
Referee: Haim Yakov (Israel)

6 October 2001

Italy	1–0	Hungary
Del Piero 45'	Report

Stadio Ennio Tardini, Parma
Attendance: 20,545
Referee: Epifanio González (Paraguay)
6 October 2001

Romania	1–1	Georgia
Gh. Popescu 88'	Report	Iashvili 55'

Stadionul Steaua, Bucharest
Attendance: 16,500
Referee: Ľuboš Micheľ (Slovakia)

== Goalscorers ==
There were 55 goals scored in 20 matches, for an average of 2.75 goals per match.

7 goals

- (Italy) Filippo Inzaghi

5 goals

- (Italy) Alessandro Del Piero

4 goals

- (Georgia (country)) Aleksandr Iashvili

3 goals

- (Hungary) Miklós Fehér
- (Hungary) Ferenc Horváth
- (Romania) Marius Niculae

2 goals

- (Georgia (country)) Temuri Ketsbaia
- (Hungary) Attila Korsós
- (Hungary) János Mátyus
- (Hungary) Vilmos Sebők
- (Italy) Marco Delvecchio
- (Italy) Francesco Totti
- (Romania) Adrian Ilie

1 goal

- (Georgia (country)) Archil Arveladze
- (Georgia (country)) Shota Arveladze
- (Georgia (country)) Giorgi Gakhokidze
- (Georgia (country)) Gocha Jamarauli
- (Georgia (country)) Georgi Kinkladze
- (Georgia (country)) Levan Kobiashvili
- (Hungary) Béla Illés
- (Hungary) Krisztián Lisztes
- (Lithuania) Orestas Buitkus
- (Lithuania) Artūras Fomenka
- (Lithuania) Tomas Ražanauskas
- (Romania) Cosmin Contra
- (Romania) Ioan Ganea
- (Romania) Viorel Moldovan
- (Romania) Cătălin Munteanu
- (Romania) Gheorghe Popescu
