= 2002 FIFA World Cup qualification – UEFA Group 3 =

Football tournament qualification stage

The six teams in this group played against each other on a home-and-away basis. The group winner Denmark qualified for the 17th FIFA World Cup held in South Korea and Japan. The runner-up Czech Republic advanced to the UEFA Play-off and played against Belgium. Denmark went through the group undefeated, but four draws - three in their first five matches - kept the Czech Republic in the hunt despite the latter shipping an unexpected loss to Iceland, which in turn kept Bulgaria in with a shout for second place. In fact, in the final round of matches, the Czechs were level with Bulgaria on points but delivered a 6-0 hammering: while Denmark, just two points ahead of the Czechs, thrashed Iceland by the same margin to maintain their lead in the group.

== Standings ==
Pos	Team	Pld	W	D	L	GF	GA	GD	Pts	Qualification	Denmark national football team	Czech Republic national football team	Bulgaria national football team	Iceland national football team	Northern Ireland national football team	Malta national football team
1	Denmark	10	6	4	0	22	6	+16	22	Qualification to 2002 FIFA World Cup	—	2–1	1–1	6–0	1–1	2–1
2	Czech Republic	10	6	2	2	20	8	+12	20	Advance to UEFA play-offs	0–0	—	6–0	4–0	3–1	3–2
3	Bulgaria	10	5	2	3	14	15	−1	17		0–2	0–1	—	2–1	4–3	3–0
4	Iceland	10	4	1	5	14	20	−6	13		1–2	3–1	1–1	—	1–0	3–0
5	Northern Ireland	10	3	2	5	11	12	−1	11		1–1	0–1	0–1	3–0	—	1–0
6	Malta	10	0	1	9	4	24	−20	1		0–5	0–0	0–2	1–4	0–1	—

== Matches ==
2 September 2000
18:00

Iceland	1–2	Denmark
E. Sverrisson 12'	Report	Tomasson 26'; Bisgaard 48'

Laugardalsvöllur, Reykjavík
Attendance: 7,017
Referee: Stéphane Bré (France)
2 September 2000
19:00

Bulgaria	0–1	Czech Republic
	Report	Poborský 73' (pen.)

Georgi Asparuhov Stadium, Sofia
Attendance: 8,000
Referee: Juan Fernández Marín (Spain)
2 September 2000
15:00

Northern Ireland	1–0	Malta
Gray 70'	Report

Windsor Park, Belfast
Attendance: 8,227
Referee: Taras Bezubiak (Russia)

7 October 2000
15:00

Northern Ireland	1–1	Denmark
Healy 38'	Report	Rommedahl 59'

Windsor Park, Belfast
Attendance: 11,823
Referee: Vítor Melo Pereira (Portugal)
7 October 2000
17:00

Czech Republic	4–0	Iceland
Koller 17', 40'; Nedvěd 44', 90'	Report

Na Stínadlech, Teplice
Attendance: 9,843
Referee: Kyros Vassaras (Greece)
7 October 2000
18:30

Bulgaria	3–0	Malta
G. Ivanov 40', 65'; S. Todorov 90'	Report

Georgi Asparuhov Stadium, Sofia
Attendance: 3,000
Referee: Džemal Čalija (Bosnia and Herzegovina)

11 October 2000
19:15

Denmark	1–1	Bulgaria
Sand 72'	Report	Berbatov 83'

Parken Stadium, Copenhagen
Attendance: 39,847
Referee: Oğuz Sarvan (Turkey)
11 October 2000
18:00

Malta	0–0	Czech Republic
	Report

Ta' Qali National Stadium, Ta' Qali
Attendance: 582
Referee: Željko Širić (Croatia)
11 October 2000
19:30

Iceland	1–0	Northern Ireland
Th. Guðjónsson 89'	Report

Laugardalsvöllur, Reykjavík
Attendance: 6,780
Referee: Markus Merk (Germany)

24 March 2001
20:00

Malta	0–5	Denmark
	Report	Sand 8', 63', 79'; Heintze 51'; C. Jensen 76'

Ta' Qali National Stadium, Ta' Qali
Attendance: 784
Referee: Mike McCurry (Scotland)
24 March 2001
15:00

Northern Ireland	0–1	Czech Republic
	Report	Nedvěd 12'

Windsor Park, Belfast
Attendance: 10,368
Referee: Manuel Mejuto González (Spain)
24 March 2001
18:00

Bulgaria	2–1	Iceland
Chomakov 36'; Berbatov 79'	Report	Hreidarsson 25'

Balgarska Armia Stadium, Sofia
Attendance: 14,500
Referee: Mike Riley (England)

28 March 2001
20:30

Czech Republic	0–0	Denmark
	Report

Letná Stadium, Prague
Attendance: 16,354
Referee: Graham Barber (England)
28 March 2001
18:00

Bulgaria	4–3	Northern Ireland
Balakov 7' (pen.); Petrov 17', 78'; Chomakov 72'	Report	Williams 15'; Elliott 84'; Healy 90' (pen.)

Balgarska Armia Stadium, Sofia
Attendance: 15,600
Referee: Vladimír Hriňák (Slovakia)

25 April 2001
19:00

Malta	1–4	Iceland
Mifsud 14'	Report	T. Guðmundsson 42'; He. Sigurdsson 44'; E. Guðjohnsen 81'; Th. Guðjónsson 90'

Ta' Qali National Stadium, Ta' Qali
Attendance: 2,800
Referee: Constantin Zotta (Romania)

2 June 2001
19:15

Denmark	2–1	Czech Republic
Sand 6'; Tomasson 82'	Report	Týce 40'

Parken Stadium, Copenhagen
Attendance: 41,669
Referee: Markus Merk (Germany)
2 June 2001
15:00

Northern Ireland	0–1	Bulgaria
	Report	G. Ivanov 52'

Windsor Park, Belfast
Attendance: 7,609
Referee: Massimo Busacca (Switzerland)
2 June 2001
16:00

Iceland	3–0	Malta
T. Guðmundsson 7'; Daðason 38'; E. Guðjohnsen 68'	Report

Laugardalsvöllur, Reykjavík
Attendance: 3,554
Referee: Romāns Lajuks (Latvia)

6 June 2001
19:15

Denmark	2–1	Malta
Sand 43', 83'	Report	Mallia 8'

Parken Stadium, Copenhagen
Attendance: 38,499
Referee: Sergey Shmolik (Belarus)
6 June 2001
17:00

Czech Republic	3–1	Northern Ireland
Kuka 40', 88'; Baroš 90'	Report	Mulryne 45'

Na Stínadlech, Teplice
Attendance: 14,050
Referee: Leif Sundell (Sweden)
6 June 2001
18:00

Iceland	1–1	Bulgaria
Daðason 43'	Report	Berbatov 81'

Laugardalsvöllur, Reykjavík
Attendance: 4,316
Referee: Dermot Gallagher (England)

1 September 2001
19:15

Denmark	1–1	Northern Ireland
Rommedahl 3'	Report	Mulryne 73'

Parken Stadium, Copenhagen
Attendance: 41,500
Referee: Ryszard Wójcik (Poland)
1 September 2001
14:00

Iceland	3–1	Czech Republic
E. Sverrisson 45', 77'; A. Sigthórsson 66'	Report	Jankulovski 88'

Laugardalsvöllur, Reykjavík
Attendance: 6,011
Referee: Domenico Messina (Italy)
1 September 2001
20:00

Malta	0–2	Bulgaria
	Report	Berbatov 74', 80'

Ta' Qali National Stadium, Ta' Qali
Attendance: 409
Referee: Hartmut Strampe (Germany)

5 September 2001
20:00

Bulgaria	0–2	Denmark
	Report	Tomasson 47', 90+1'

Balgarska Armia Stadium, Sofia
Attendance: 20,000
Referee: Jan Wegereef (Netherlands)
5 September 2001
17:00

Czech Republic	3–2	Malta
Jankulovski 20'; Lokvenc 37'; Baroš 68'	Report	Carabott 22' (pen.); G. Agius 55'

Na Stínadlech, Teplice
Attendance: 9,280
Referee: Khagani Mamedov (Azerbaijan)
5 September 2001
20:00

Northern Ireland	3–0	Iceland
Healy 48'; Hughes 58'; McCartney 61'	Report

Windsor Park, Belfast
Attendance: 6,625
Referee: Attila Hanacsek (Hungary)

6 October 2001
20:15

Denmark	6–0	Iceland
Rommedahl 12'; Sand 14', 66'; Gravesen 31', 35'; Michaelsen 90'	Report

Parken Stadium, Copenhagen
Attendance: 41,769
Referee: Arturo Daudén Ibáñez (Spain)
6 October 2001
20:15

Czech Republic	6–0	Bulgaria
Rosický 5', 69'; Nedvěd 16', 76'; Baroš 27'; Lokvenc 66'	Report

Letná Stadium, Prague
Attendance: 15,020
Referee: Claude Colombo (France)
6 October 2001
18:30

Malta	0–1	Northern Ireland
	Report	Healy 57' (pen.)

Ta' Qali National Stadium, Ta' Qali
Attendance: 1,778
Referee: Manfred Schüttengruber (Austria)

== Goalscorers ==
There were 85 goals scored in 30 matches, for an average of 2.83 goals per match.

9 goals

- (Denmark) Ebbe Sand

5 goals

- (Bulgaria) Dimitar Berbatov
- (Czech Republic) Pavel Nedvěd

4 goals

- (Denmark) Jon Dahl Tomasson
- (Northern Ireland) David Healy

3 goals

- (Bulgaria) Georgi Ivanov
- (Czech Republic) Milan Baroš
- (Denmark) Dennis Rommedahl
- (Iceland) Eyjólfur Sverrisson

2 goals

- (Bulgaria) Krasimir Chomakov
- (Bulgaria) Martin Petrov
- (Czech Republic) Jan Koller
- (Czech Republic) Pavel Kuka
- (Czech Republic) Marek Jankulovski
- (Czech Republic) Vratislav Lokvenc
- (Czech Republic) Tomáš Rosický
- (Denmark) Thomas Gravesen
- (Iceland) Ríkharður Daðason
- (Iceland) Þórður Guðjónsson
- (Iceland) Eiður Guðjohnsen
- (Iceland) Tryggvi Guðmundsson
- (Northern Ireland) Philip Mulryne

1 goal

- (Bulgaria) Krasimir Balakov
- (Bulgaria) Svetoslav Todorov
- (Czech Republic) Karel Poborský
- (Czech Republic) Roman Týce
- (Denmark) Morten Bisgaard
- (Denmark) Jan Heintze
- (Denmark) Claus Jensen
- (Denmark) Jan Michaelsen
- (Iceland) Hermann Hreidarsson
- (Iceland) Helgi Sigurðsson
- (Iceland) Andri Sigþórsson
- (Malta) Gilbert Agius
- (Malta) David Carabott
- (Malta) George Mallia
- (Malta) Michael Mifsud
- (Northern Ireland) Stuart Elliott
- (Northern Ireland) Phil Gray
- (Northern Ireland) Michael Hughes
- (Northern Ireland) George McCartney
- (Northern Ireland) Mark Williams
