= 2002 FIFA World Cup qualification – UEFA second round =

Football tournament qualifying stage

The 2002 FIFA World Cup European qualification play-offs were a set of home-and-away play-offs to decide the final four places granted to national football teams from European nations (more precisely, UEFA members) for the 2002 FIFA World Cup.

The play-offs were decided by the standard FIFA method of aggregate score, with away goals and, if necessary, extra time with the possibility of a penalty shoot-out at the end of the second leg. The winner of each play-off was awarded a place in the 2002 FIFA World Cup.

== Seeding and draw ==
The draw for the play-offs was held on 31 August 2001 at FIFA's headquarters in Zürich, Switzerland. The nine group runners-up were placed into one pot, with eight teams drawn into four pairings (with the first team drawn hosting the first leg). The remaining team then faced an AFC team in the inter-confederation play-offs. UEFA were paired to face the AFC team by decision of the FIFA Executive Committee in October 1999.

== Qualified teams ==
The teams that finished second in Groups 1 and 3–9 from the first round qualified for the second round.

- Austria
- Belgium
- Czech Republic
- Germany
- Romania
- Slovenia
- Turkey
- Ukraine

== Matches ==
Team 1	Agg.	Team 2	1st leg	2nd leg
Belgium	2–0	Czech Republic	1–0	1–0
Ukraine	2–5	Germany	1–1	1–4
Slovenia	3–2	Romania	2–1	1–1
Austria	0–6	Turkey	0–1	0–5

10 November 2001
20:15

Belgium	1–0	Czech Republic
G. Verheyen 28'	Report

Stade Roi Baudouin, Brussels
Attendance: 39,000
Referee: Urs Meier (Switzerland)
14 November 2001
20:15

Czech Republic	0–1	Belgium
	Report	Wilmots 85' (pen.)

Letná Stadium, Prague
Attendance: 18,996
Referee: Anders Frisk (Sweden)

Belgium won 2–0 on aggregate and qualified for the 2002 FIFA World Cup.

10 November 2001
19:00

Ukraine	1–1	Germany
Zubov 18'	Report	Ballack 31'

Olimpiyskyi National Sports Complex, Kyiv
Attendance: 83,000
Referee: Stefano Braschi (Italy)
14 November 2001
20:45

Germany	4–1	Ukraine
Ballack 4', 51'; Neuville 11'; Rehmer 15'	Report	Shevchenko 90'

Westfalenstadion, Dortmund
Attendance: 52,400
Referee: Vítor Melo Pereira (Portugal)

Germany won 5–2 on aggregate and qualified for the 2002 FIFA World Cup.

10 November 2001
19:00

Slovenia	2–1	Romania
Ačimovič 41'; Osterc 70'	Report	M. Niculae 26'

Bežigrad Stadium, Ljubljana
Attendance: 8,500
Referee: Kim Milton Nielsen (Denmark)
14 November 2001

Romania	1–1	Slovenia
Contra 65'	Report	Rudonja 55'

Stadionul Steaua, Bucharest
Attendance: 24,500
Referee: Hellmut Krug (Germany)

Slovenia won 3–2 on aggregate and qualified for the 2002 FIFA World Cup.

10 November 2001
20:30

Austria	0–1	Turkey
	Report	Buruk 60'

Ernst Happel Stadion, Vienna
Attendance: 50,000
Referee: Manuel Mejuto González (Spain)
14 November 2001
19:30

Turkey	5–0	Austria
Baştürk 21'; Şükür 31'; Buruk 45'; Erdem 69', 85'	Report

Ali Sami Yen Stadium, Istanbul
Attendance: 22,000
Referee: Pierluigi Collina (Italy)

Turkey won 6–0 on aggregate and qualified for the 2002 FIFA World Cup.

== Goalscorers ==
There were 20 goals scored in 8 matches, for an average of 2.5 goals per match.

3 goals

- (Germany) Michael Ballack

2 goals

- (Turkey) Okan Buruk
- (Turkey) Arif Erdem

1 goal

- (Belgium) Gert Verheyen
- (Belgium) Marc Wilmots
- (Germany) Oliver Neuville
- (Germany) Marko Rehmer
- (Romania) Cosmin Contra
- (Romania) Marius Niculae
- (Slovenia) Milenko Ačimovič
- (Slovenia) Milan Osterc
- (Slovenia) Mladen Rudonja
- (Turkey) Yildiray Baştürk
- (Turkey) Hakan Şükür
- (Ukraine) Andriy Shevchenko
- (Ukraine) Hennadiy Zubov
