= 2006 FIFA World Cup qualification (UEFA) =

Tournament details
- Dates: 18 August 2004 – 16 November 2005
- Teams: 51 (from 1 confederation)

Tournament statistics
- Matches played: 282
- Goals scored: 778 (2.76 per match)
- Attendance: 5,739,074 (20,351 per match)
- Top scorer(s): (Portugal) Pauleta (11 goals)

Listed below are the dates and results for the 2006 FIFA World Cup qualification rounds for UEFA teams. A total of 51 teams took part, divided in 8 groups – five groups of six teams each and three groups of seven teams each – competing for 13 places in the World Cup. Germany, the hosts, were already qualified, for a total of 14 European places in the tournament. The qualifying process started on 18 August 2004, over a month after the end of UEFA Euro 2004, and ended on 16 November 2005. Kazakhstan, which transitioned from the Asian Football Confederation to UEFA after the end of the 2002 FIFA World Cup, debuted in the European qualifiers.

The teams in each group played against each other in a home and away basis. The team with the most points in each group qualified to the World Cup. The runners up were ranked against each other. For fairness rules, results against the seventh placed team were ignored, in groups of seven teams. The two best ranked runners-up also qualified to the World Cup. The other six runners-up were drawn into three two-legged knock out matches, the playoff winners also qualifying.

Apart from hosts Germany, debuting Ukraine became the first team to qualify in Europe.

France had its first successful World Cup qualifying campaign in twenty years as they had missed the 1990 and 1994 tournaments, then qualified automatically as hosts in 1998 and as defending champions in 2002.

Serbia and Montenegro and Croatia also advanced to Germany at the head of their sections, the former forcing Spain into the playoffs in the process. Besides the eight group winners, two teams progressed automatically as best runners up, namely Poland and Sweden while the playoffs offered a second chance to six others.

== Qualification seeding (UEFA) ==
The draw was made on 5 December 2003 in Frankfurt, Germany. Germany qualified automatically as hosts. The other seedings were determined by points per game in the qualifiers for 2002 FIFA World Cup qualification and UEFA Euro 2004 qualifying. France qualified automatically for the 2002 FIFA World Cup as title holders, so only their record in UEFA Euro 2004 qualifying was used. Portugal qualified automatically for UEFA Euro 2004 as hosts, so only their record in World Cup 2002 was used. Kazakhstan were not ranked by this system as they did not participate in either competition.

For domestic clubs involved in international club competitions reasons, England, France, Italy and Spain were drawn into groups of 6 teams.

Pot A
Team	Coeff	Rank
France	3.00	1
Portugal	2.40	2
Sweden	2.39	3
Czech Republic	2.31	4
Spain	2.31	5
Italy	2.31	6
England	2.31	7
Turkey	2.22	8

Pot B
Team	Coeff	Rank
Netherlands	2.17	9
Croatia	2.12	10
Belgium	2.06	11
Denmark	2.05	12
Russia	2.05	13
Republic of Ireland	1.94	14
Slovenia	1.89	15
Poland	1.89	16

Pot C
Team	Coeff	Rank
Bulgaria	1.89	17
Romania	1.87	18
Scotland	1.81	19
Serbia and Montenegro	1.72	20
Switzerland	1.61	21
Greece	1.56	22
Slovakia	1.50	23
Austria	1.50	24

Pot D
Team	Coeff	Rank
Ukraine	1.50	25
Iceland	1.44	26
Finland	1.37	27
Norway	1.33	28
Israel	1.31	29
Bosnia and Herzegovina	1.31	30
Latvia	1.25	31
Wales	1.22	32

Pot E
Team	Coeff	Rank
Hungary	1.19	33
Georgia	1.06	34
Belarus	1.00	35
Cyprus	0.89	36
Estonia	0.89	37
Northern Ireland	0.78	38
Lithuania	0.75	39
Macedonia	0.75	40

Pot F
Team	Coeff	Rank
Albania	0.69	41
Armenia	0.67	42
Moldova	0.67	43
Azerbaijan	0.50	44
Faroe Islands	0.44	45
Malta	0.11	46
San Marino	0.06	47
Liechtenstein	0.06	48

Pot G
Team	Coeff	Rank
Andorra	0.00	49
Luxembourg	0.00	50
Kazakhstan	0.00	51

== First round ==
=== Summary ===
Winner of each group and two best runners-up qualified directly for the 2006 FIFA World Cup
The other runners-up advanced to the second round (play-offs)
Other teams were eliminated after the first round

Group 1	Group 2	Group 3	Group 4	Group 5	Group 6	Group 7	Group 8
Netherlands	Ukraine	Portugal	France	Italy	England	Serbia and Montenegro	Croatia
Czech Republic	Turkey	Slovakia	Switzerland	Norway	Poland	Spain	Sweden
Romania Finland Macedonia Armenia Andorra	Denmark Greece Albania Georgia Kazakhstan	Russia Estonia Latvia Liechtenstein Luxembourg	Israel Republic of Ireland Cyprus Faroe Islands	Scotland Slovenia Belarus Moldova	Austria Northern Ireland Wales Azerbaijan	Bosnia and Herzegovina Belgium Lithuania San Marino	Bulgaria Hungary Iceland Malta

=== Group 1 ===
Pos	Team	Pld	W	D	L	GF	GA	GD	Pts	Qualification	Netherlands national football team	Czech Republic national football team	Romania national football team	Finland national football team	North Macedonia national football team	Armenia national football team	Andorra national football team
1	Netherlands	12	10	2	0	27	3	+24	32	Qualification to 2006 FIFA World Cup	—	2–0	2–0	3–1	0–0	2–0	4–0
2	Czech Republic	12	9	0	3	35	12	+23	27	Advance to second round	0–2	—	1–0	4–3	6–1	4–1	8–1
3	Romania	12	8	1	3	20	10	+10	25		0–2	2–0	—	2–1	2–1	3–0	2–0
4	Finland	12	5	1	6	21	19	+2	16		0–4	0–3	0–1	—	5–1	3–1	3–0
5	Macedonia	12	2	3	7	11	24	−13	9		2–2	0–2	1–2	0–3	—	3–0	0–0
6	Armenia	12	2	1	9	9	25	−16	7		0–1	0–3	1–1	0–2	1–2	—	2–1
7	Andorra	12	1	2	9	4	34	−30	5		0–3	0–4	1–5	0–0	1–0	0–3	—

Rules for classification: Tiebreakers

=== Group 2 ===
Pos	Team	Pld	W	D	L	GF	GA	GD	Pts	Qualification	Ukraine national football team	Turkey national football team	Denmark national football team	Greece national football team	Albania national football team	Georgia national football team	Kazakhstan national football team
1	Ukraine	12	7	4	1	18	7	+11	25	Qualification to 2006 FIFA World Cup	—	0–1	1–0	1–1	2–2	2–0	2–0
2	Turkey	12	6	5	1	23	9	+14	23	Advance to second round	0–3	—	2–2	0–0	2–0	1–1	4–0
3	Denmark	12	6	4	2	24	12	+12	22		1–1	1–1	—	1–0	3–1	6–1	3–0
4	Greece	12	6	3	3	15	9	+6	21		0–1	0–0	2–1	—	2–0	1–0	3–1
5	Albania	12	4	1	7	11	20	−9	13		0–2	0–1	0–2	2–1	—	3–2	2–1
6	Georgia	12	2	4	6	14	25	−11	10		1–1	2–5	2–2	1–3	2–0	—	0–0
7	Kazakhstan	12	0	1	11	6	29	−23	1		1–2	0–6	1–2	1–2	0–1	1–2	—

Rules for classification: Tiebreakers

=== Group 3 ===
Pos	Team	Pld	W	D	L	GF	GA	GD	Pts	Qualification	Portugal national football team	Slovakia national football team	Russia national football team	Estonia national football team	Latvia national football team	Liechtenstein national football team	Luxembourg national football team
1	Portugal	12	9	3	0	35	5	+30	30	Qualification to 2006 FIFA World Cup	—	2–0	7–1	4–0	3–0	2–1	6–0
2	Slovakia	12	6	5	1	24	8	+16	23	Advance to second round	1–1	—	0–0	1–0	4–1	7–0	3–1
3	Russia	12	6	5	1	23	12	+11	23		0–0	1–1	—	4–0	2–0	2–0	5–1
4	Estonia	12	5	2	5	16	17	−1	17		0–1	1–2	1–1	—	2–1	2–0	4–0
5	Latvia	12	4	3	5	18	21	−3	15		0–2	1–1	1–1	2–2	—	1–0	4–0
6	Liechtenstein	12	2	2	8	13	23	−10	8		2–2	0–0	1–2	1–2	1–3	—	3–0
7	Luxembourg	12	0	0	12	5	48	−43	0		0–5	0–4	0–4	0–2	3–4	0–4	—

Rules for classification: Tiebreakers

=== Group 4 ===
Pos	Team	Pld	W	D	L	GF	GA	GD	Pts	Qualification	France national football team	Switzerland national football team	Israel national football team	Republic of Ireland national football team	Cyprus national football team	Faroe Islands national football team
1	France	10	5	5	0	14	2	+12	20	Qualification to 2006 FIFA World Cup	—	0–0	0–0	0–0	4–0	3–0
2	Switzerland	10	4	6	0	18	7	+11	18	Advance to second round	1–1	—	1–1	1–1	1–0	6–0
3	Israel	10	4	6	0	15	10	+5	18		1–1	2–2	—	1–1	2–1	2–1
4	Republic of Ireland	10	4	5	1	12	5	+7	17		0–1	0–0	2–2	—	3–0	2–0
5	Cyprus	10	1	1	8	8	20	−12	4		0–2	1–3	1–2	0–1	—	2–2
6	Faroe Islands	10	0	1	9	4	27	−23	1		0–2	1–3	0–2	0–2	0–3	—

Rules for classification: Tiebreakers

=== Group 5 ===
Pos	Team	Pld	W	D	L	GF	GA	GD	Pts	Qualification	Italy national football team	Norway national football team	Scotland national football team	Slovenia national football team	Belarus national football team	Moldova national football team
1	Italy	10	7	2	1	17	8	+9	23	Qualification to 2006 FIFA World Cup	—	2–1	2–0	1–0	4–3	2–1
2	Norway	10	5	3	2	12	7	+5	18	Advance to second round	0–0	—	1–2	3–0	1–1	1–0
3	Scotland	10	3	4	3	9	7	+2	13		1–1	0–1	—	0–0	0–1	2–0
4	Slovenia	10	3	3	4	10	13	−3	12		1–0	2–3	0–3	—	1–1	3–0
5	Belarus	10	2	4	4	12	14	−2	10		1–4	0–1	0–0	1–1	—	4–0
6	Moldova	10	1	2	7	5	16	−11	5		0–1	0–0	1–1	1–2	2–0	—

Rules for classification: Tiebreakers

=== Group 6 ===
Pos	Team	Pld	W	D	L	GF	GA	GD	Pts	Qualification	England national football team	Poland national football team	Austria national football team	Northern Ireland national football team	Wales national football team	Azerbaijan national football team
1	England	10	8	1	1	17	5	+12	25	Qualification to 2006 FIFA World Cup	—	2–1	1–0	4–0	2–0	2–0
2	Poland	10	8	0	2	27	9	+18	24	Qualification to 2006 FIFA World Cup	1–2	—	3–2	1–0	1–0	8–0
3	Austria	10	4	3	3	15	12	+3	15		2–2	1–3	—	2–0	1–0	2–0
4	Northern Ireland	10	2	3	5	10	18	−8	9		1–0	0–3	3–3	—	2–3	2–0
5	Wales	10	2	2	6	10	15	−5	8		0–1	2–3	0–2	2–2	—	2–0
6	Azerbaijan	10	0	3	7	1	21	−20	3		0–1	0–3	0–0	0–0	1–1	—

Rules for classification: Tiebreakers

=== Group 7 ===
Pos	Team	Pld	W	D	L	GF	GA	GD	Pts	Qualification	Serbia and Montenegro national football team	Spain national football team	Bosnia and Herzegovina national football team	Belgium national football team	Lithuania national football team	San Marino national football team
1	Serbia and Montenegro	10	6	4	0	16	1	+15	22	Qualification to 2006 FIFA World Cup	—	0–0	1–0	0–0	2–0	5–0
2	Spain	10	5	5	0	19	3	+16	20	Advance to second round	1–1	—	1–1	2–0	1–0	5–0
3	Bosnia and Herzegovina	10	4	4	2	12	9	+3	16		0–0	1–1	—	1–0	1–1	3–0
4	Belgium	10	3	3	4	16	11	+5	12		0–2	0–2	4–1	—	1–1	8–0
5	Lithuania	10	2	4	4	8	9	−1	10		0–2	0–0	0–1	1–1	—	4–0
6	San Marino	10	0	0	10	2	40	−38	0		0–3	0–6	1–3	1–2	0–1	—

Rules for classification: Tiebreakers

=== Group 8 ===
Pos	Team	Pld	W	D	L	GF	GA	GD	Pts	Qualification	Croatia national football team	Sweden men's national football team	Bulgaria national football team	Hungary national football team	Iceland national football team	Malta national football team
1	Croatia	10	7	3	0	21	5	+16	24	Qualification to 2006 FIFA World Cup	—	1–0	2–2	3–0	4–0	3–0
2	Sweden	10	8	0	2	30	4	+26	24	Qualification to 2006 FIFA World Cup	0–1	—	3–0	3–0	3–1	6–0
3	Bulgaria	10	4	3	3	17	17	0	15		1–3	0–3	—	2–0	3–2	4–1
4	Hungary	10	4	2	4	13	14	−1	14		0–0	0–1	1–1	—	3–2	4–0
5	Iceland	10	1	1	8	14	27	−13	4		1–3	1–4	1–3	2–3	—	4–1
6	Malta	10	0	3	7	4	32	−28	3		1–1	0–7	1–1	0–2	0–0	—

Rules for classification: Tiebreakers

== Play-offs ==
=== Ranking of runners-up ===
Because three groups each had seven teams and the others each had six, matches against the 7th placed team were discarded for the purposes of the ranking

Pos	Grp	Team	Pld	W	D	L	GF	GA	GD	Pts	Qualification
1	8	Sweden	10	8	0	2	30	4	+26	24	Qualification to 2006 FIFA World Cup
2	6	Poland	10	8	0	2	27	9	+18	24	Qualification to 2006 FIFA World Cup
3	1	Czech Republic	10	7	0	3	23	11	+12	21	Advance to second round (play-offs)
4	7	Spain	10	5	5	0	19	3	+16	20	Advance to second round (play-offs)
5	4	Switzerland	10	4	6	0	18	7	+11	18	Advance to second round (play-offs)
6	5	Norway	10	5	3	2	12	7	+5	18	Advance to second round (play-offs)
7	3	Slovakia	10	4	5	1	17	7	+10	17	Advance to second round (play-offs)
8	2	Turkey	10	4	5	1	13	9	+4	17	Advance to second round (play-offs)

=== Matches ===
Team 1	Agg.	Team 2	1st leg	2nd leg
Spain	6–2	Slovakia	5–1	1–1
Switzerland	4–4 (a)	Turkey	2–0	2–4
Norway	0–2	Czech Republic	0–1	0–1

== Qualified teams ==
The following 14 teams from UEFA qualified for the final tournament.

Team	Qualified as	Qualified on	Previous appearances in FIFA World Cup^{1}
Germany	Hosts	6 July 2000	15 (1934, 1938, **1954**^{2}, 1958^{2}, 1962^{2}, 1966^{2}, 1970^{2}, **1974**^{2}, 1978^{2}, 1982^{2}, 1986^{2}, **1990**^{2}, 1994, 1998, 2002)
Netherlands	Group 1 winners	8 October 2005	7 (1934, 1938, 1974, 1978, 1990, 1994, 1998)
Ukraine	Group 2 winners	3 September 2005	0 (debut)
Portugal	Group 3 winners	8 October 2005	3 (1966, 1986, 2002)
France	Group 4 winners	12 October 2005	11 (1930, 1934, 1938, 1954, 1958, 1966, 1978, 1982, 1986, **1998**, 2002)
Italy	Group 5 winners	8 October 2005	15 (**1934**, **1938**, 1950, 1954, 1962, 1966, 1970, 1974, 1978, **1982**, 1986, 1990, 1994, 1998, 2002)
England	Group 6 winners	8 October 2005	11 (1950, 1954, 1958, 1962, **1966**, 1970, 1982, 1986, 1990, 1998, 2002)
Serbia and Montenegro	Group 7 winners	12 October 2005	9 (1930^{3}, 1950^{3}, 1954^{3}, 1958^{3}, 1962^{3}, 1974^{3}, 1982^{3}, 1990^{3}, 1998^{3})
Croatia	Group 8 winners	8 October 2005	2 (1998, 2002)
Poland	Top 2 runners-up	8 October 2005	6 (1938, 1974, 1978, 1982, 1986, 2002)
Sweden	Top 2 runners-up	8 October 2005	10 (1934, 1938, 1950, 1958, 1970, 1974, 1978, 1990, 1994, 2002)
Spain	Play-off winners	16 November 2005	11 (1934, 1950, 1962, 1966, 1978, 1982, 1986, 1990, 1994, 1998, 2002)
Switzerland	Play-off winners	16 November 2005	7 (1934, 1938, 1950, 1954, 1962, 1966, 1994)
Czech Republic	Play-off winners	16 November 2005	8 (1934^{4}, 1938^{4}, 1954^{4}, 1958^{4}, 1962^{4}, 1970^{4}, 1982^{4}, 1990^{4})

^{1} Bold indicates champions for that year. Italic indicates hosts for that year.
^{2} Competed as West Germany. A separate team for East Germany also participated in qualifications during this time, having only competed in 1974.
^{3} From 1930 to 1998, Serbia and Montenegro competed as Yugoslavia.
^{4} From 1934 to 1990, the Czech Republic competed as Czechoslovakia.

== Top goalscorers ==
There were 778 goals scored in 282 matches, for an average of 2.76 goals per match.

11 goals

- (Portugal) Pauleta

9 goals

- (Czech Republic) Jan Koller

8 goals

- (Finland) Alexei Eremenko
- (Sweden) Zlatan Ibrahimović

7 goals

- (Bulgaria) Dimitar Berbatov
- (Czech Republic) Tomáš Rosický
- (Estonia) Andres Oper
- (Netherlands) Ruud Van Nistelrooy
- (Poland) Tomasz Frankowski
- (Poland) Maciej Żurawski
- (Portugal) Cristiano Ronaldo
- (Romania) Adrian Mutu
- (Spain) Fernando Torres
- (Sweden) Freddie Ljungberg
- (Switzerland) Alexander Frei
- (Turkey) Fatih Tekke

Below are full goalscorer lists for all groups and the play-off round:

- Group 1
- Group 2
- Group 3
- Group 4
- Group 5
- Group 6
- Group 7
- Group 8
- Play-offs
