= 2006 FIFA World Cup qualification (AFC) =

Tournament details
- Dates: 19 November 2003 - 16 November 2005
- Teams: 38 (from 1 confederation)

Tournament statistics
- Matches played: 134
- Goals scored: 400 (2.99 per match)
- Attendance: 2,873,158 (21,441 per match)
- Top scorer(s): (Iran) Ali Daei (9 goals)

Listed below are the dates and results for the 2006 FIFA World Cup qualification rounds for Asia.

44 Asian teams are affiliated with FIFA, but Cambodia, Philippines, Bhutan and Brunei decided not to take part, and Myanmar were banned from the competition (for refusing to play a qualifier in Iran during 2002 qualifying), so a total of 39 teams took part, competing for 4.5 places in the World Cup.

== Format ==
The qualification was composed of three rounds. Only the 14 last ranked teams according to FIFA took part in the Preliminary Round, where they were paired 2-by-2 and played home-and-away knock-out matches. The 7 winners joined the other 25 teams in the second round, where those 32 teams were divided in 8 groups of four teams each. The teams in each group would play against each other home-and-away, and the team with most points in each group would advance to the Third Round.

In the third round, the 8 remaining teams were divided in two groups of 4 teams each, that would again play against each other in a home-and-away basis. The two teams with most points in each group would qualify to the World Cup. The two third placed teams would play-off against each other home-and-away. Winner of this play-off would play against the fourth placed team in the final round of CONCACAF in an intercontinental play-off for a place in the World Cup.

== First round ==
Team 1	Agg.	Team 2	1st leg	2nd leg
Turkmenistan	13–0	Afghanistan	11–0	2–0
Chinese Taipei	6–1	Macau	3–0	3–1
Bangladesh	0–4	Tajikistan	0–2	0–2
Laos	0–3	Sri Lanka	0–0	0–3
Pakistan	0–6	Kyrgyzstan	0–2	0–4
Mongolia	0–13	Maldives	0–1	0–12

Guam and Nepal were scheduled to play against each other on November 21 and 25; Nepal withdrew, so Guam progressed to the 2nd round, but Guam later withdrew.

FIFA then decided to elect a "lucky loser", to select the best of the teams that lost, to advance to the second round.

The losers were compared, using the following criteria to break ties: a) number of points; b) goal difference; c) goals scored.

Team	Pld	W	D	L	GF	GA	GD	Pts
Laos	2	0	1	1	0	3	−3	1
Bangladesh	2	0	0	2	0	4	−4	0
Macau	2	0	0	2	1	6	−5	0
Pakistan	2	0	0	2	0	6	−6	0
Afghanistan	2	0	0	2	0	13	−13	0
Mongolia	2	0	0	2	0	13	−13	0

Source: futsalplanet

Laos advanced to the second round.

== Second round ==
In the second round, the 25 teams who received byes, as well as the 7 play-off round winners, were split into eight groups of four teams each. Teams played home-and-away games with the other teams in their group, and the top-ranked team qualified for the third round.

=== Group 1 ===
Pos	Team	Pld	W	D	L	GF	GA	GD	Pts	Qualification	Iran national football team	Jordan national football team	Qatar national football team	Laos national football team
1	Iran	6	5	0	1	22	4	+18	15	Third round	—	0–1	3–1	7–0
2	Jordan	6	4	0	2	10	6	+4	12		0–2	—	1–0	5–0
3	Qatar	6	3	0	3	16	8	+8	9		2–3	2–0	—	5–0
4	Laos	6	0	0	6	3	33	−30	0		0–7	2–3	1–6	—

Rules for classification: Tiebreakers

=== Group 2 ===
Pos	Team	Pld	W	D	L	GF	GA	GD	Pts	Qualification	Uzbekistan national football team	Iraq national football team	Palestine national football team	Chinese Taipei national football team
1	Uzbekistan	6	5	1	0	16	3	+13	16	Third round	—	1–1	3–0	6–1
2	Iraq	6	3	2	1	17	7	+10	11		1–2	—	4–1	6–1
3	Palestine	6	2	1	3	11	11	0	7		0–3	1–1	—	8–0
4	Chinese Taipei	6	0	0	6	3	26	−23	0		0–1	1–4	0–1	—

Rules for classification: Tiebreakers

=== Group 3 ===
Pos	Team	Pld	W	D	L	GF	GA	GD	Pts	Qualification	Japan national football team	Oman national football team	India national football team	Singapore national football team
1	Japan	6	6	0	0	16	1	+15	18	Third round	—	1–0	7–0	1–0
2	Oman	6	3	1	2	14	3	+11	10		0–1	—	0–0	7–0
3	India	6	1	1	4	2	18	−16	4		0–4	1–5	—	1–0
4	Singapore	6	1	0	5	3	13	−10	3		1–2	0–2	2–0	—

Rules for classification: Tiebreakers

=== Group 4 ===
Pos	Team	Pld	W	D	L	GF	GA	GD	Pts	Qualification	Kuwait national football team	China national football team	Hong Kong national football team	Malaysia national football team
1	Kuwait	6	5	0	1	15	2	+13	15	Third round	—	1–0	4–0	6–1
2	China	6	5	0	1	14	1	+13	15		1–0	—	7–0	4–0
3	Hong Kong	6	2	0	4	5	15	−10	6		0–2	0–1	—	2–0
4	Malaysia	6	0	0	6	2	18	−16	0		0–2	0–1	1–3	—

Rules for classification: Tiebreakers

=== Group 5 ===
Pos	Team	Pld	W	D	L	GF	GA	GD	Pts	Qualification	North Korea national football team	United Arab Emirates national football team	Thailand national football team	Yemen national football team
1	North Korea	6	3	2	1	11	5	+6	11	Third round	—	0–0	4–1	2–1
2	United Arab Emirates	6	3	1	2	6	6	0	10		1–0	—	1–0	3–0
3	Thailand	6	2	1	3	9	10	−1	7		1–4	3–0	—	1–1
4	Yemen	6	1	2	3	6	11	−5	5		1–1	3–1	0–3	—

Rules for classification: Tiebreakers

=== Group 6 ===
Pos	Team	Pld	W	D	L	GF	GA	GD	Pts	Qualification	Bahrain national football team	Syria national football team	Tajikistan national football team	Kyrgyzstan national football team
1	Bahrain	6	4	2	0	15	4	+11	14	Third round	—	2–1	4–0	5–0
2	Syria	6	2	2	2	7	7	0	8		2–2	—	2–1	0–1
3	Tajikistan	6	2	1	3	5	9	−4	7		0–0	0–1	—	2–1
4	Kyrgyzstan	6	1	1	4	5	12	−7	4		1–2	1–1	1–2	—

Rules for classification: Tiebreakers

=== Group 7 ===
Pos	Team	Pld	W	D	L	GF	GA	GD	Pts	Qualification	South Korea national football team	Lebanon national football team	Vietnam national football team	Maldives national football team
1	South Korea	6	4	2	0	9	2	+7	14	Third round	—	2–0	2–0	2–0
2	Lebanon	6	3	2	1	11	5	+6	11		1–1	—	0–0	3–0
3	Vietnam	6	1	1	4	5	9	−4	4		1–2	0–2	—	4–0
4	Maldives	6	1	1	4	5	14	−9	4		0–0	2–5	3–0	—

Rules for classification: Tiebreakers

=== Group 8 ===
Pos	Team	Pld	W	D	L	GF	GA	GD	Pts	Qualification	Saudi Arabia national football team	Turkmenistan national football team	Indonesia national football team	Sri Lanka national football team
1	Saudi Arabia	6	6	0	0	14	1	+13	18	Third round	—	3–0	3–0	3–0
2	Turkmenistan	6	2	1	3	8	10	−2	7		0–1	—	3–1	2–0
3	Indonesia	6	2	1	3	8	12	−4	7		1–3	3–1	—	1–0
4	Sri Lanka	6	0	2	4	4	11	−7	2		0–1	2–2	2–2	—

Rules for classification: Tiebreakers

== Third round ==
In the third round, the 8 teams who won their groups in the earlier round were split into two groups of four teams each. Teams played home-and-away games with the other teams in their group, and the top two teams qualified for the 2006 FIFA World Cup. Meanwhile, the third-placed teams entered a play-off to determine who would contest the AFC–CONCACAF play-off.

=== Group 1 ===
Pos	Team	Pld	W	D	L	GF	GA	GD	Pts	Qualification	Saudi Arabia national football team	South Korea national football team	Uzbekistan national football team	Kuwait national football team
1	Saudi Arabia	6	4	2	0	10	1	+9	14	2006 FIFA World Cup	—	2–0	3–0	3–0
2	South Korea	6	3	1	2	9	5	+4	10	2006 FIFA World Cup	0–1	—	2–1	2–0
3	Uzbekistan	6	1	2	3	7	11	−4	5	Fourth round	1–1	1–1	—	3–2
4	Kuwait	6	1	1	4	4	13	−9	4		0–0	0–4	2–1	—

Rules for classification: Tiebreakers

=== Group 2 ===
Pos	Team	Pld	W	D	L	GF	GA	GD	Pts	Qualification	Japan national football team	Iran national football team	Bahrain national football team	North Korea national football team
1	Japan	6	5	0	1	9	4	+5	15	2006 FIFA World Cup	—	2–1	1–0	2–1
2	Iran	6	4	1	1	7	3	+4	13	2006 FIFA World Cup	2–1	—	1–0	1–0
3	Bahrain	6	1	1	4	4	7	−3	4	Fourth round	0–1	0–0	—	2–3
4	North Korea	6	1	0	5	5	11	−6	3		0–2	0–2	1–2	—

Rules for classification: Tiebreakers

== Fourth round ==
Teams finishing 3rd in the third round groups played each other to determine a possible 5th qualifier from Asia. The first leg was originally played on 3 September 2005 but the match was ordered to be replayed by FIFA after a refereeing mistake. With Uzbekistan leading the tie 1–0, a penalty was awarded to them but the referee disallowed the resulting goal and offered an indirect freekick to Bahrain for encroachment. Uzbekistan had formally requested for the match to be recorded as an automatic 3–0 victory.

Team 1	Agg.	Team 2	1st leg	2nd leg
Uzbekistan	1–1 (a)	Bahrain	1–1	0–0

Bahrain advanced to the AFC–CONCACAF play-off on the away goals rule.

== Inter-confederation play-offs ==
The Fourth Round winner then played the fourth-placed team of the CONCACAF qualifying group, Trinidad and Tobago, in a home-and-away play-off. The winner of this play-off qualified for the 2006 FIFA World Cup finals.

Team 1	Agg.	Team 2	1st leg	2nd leg
Trinidad and Tobago	2–1	Bahrain	1–1	1–0

== Qualified teams ==
The following four teams from AFC qualified for the final tournament.

Team	Qualified as	Qualified on	Previous appearances in FIFA World Cup^{1}
Saudi Arabia	Third round group 1 winners	8 June 2005	3 (1994, 1998, 2002)
Japan	Third round group 2 winners	8 June 2005	2 (1998, 2002)
South Korea	Third round group 1 runners-up	8 June 2005	6 (1954, 1986, 1990, 1994, 1998, 2002)
Iran	Third round group 2 runners-up	8 June 2005	2 (1978, 1998)

^{1} Bold indicates champions for that year. Italic indicates hosts for that year.

== Top goalscorers ==
There were 400 goals scored in 134 matches, for an average of 2.99 goals per match.

9 goals

- (Iran national football team) Ali Daei

6 goals

- (Maldives national football team) Ali Ashfaq
- (Turkmenistan national football team) Begençmuhammet Kulyýew

5 goals

- (Bahrain national football team) Husain Ali
- (Bahrain national football team) A'ala Hubail
- (Indonesia national football team) Ilham Jaya Kesuma
- (Kuwait national football team) Bashar Abdullah
- (South Korea national football team) Lee Dong-gook
- (Uzbekistan national football team) Maksim Shatskikh

4 goals

- (Iran national football team) Vahid Hashemian
- (Kuwait national football team) Bader Al-Mutawa
- (Lebanon national football team) Ali Nasseredine
- (North Korea national football team) Hong Yong-jo
- (Oman national football team) Badar Al-Maimani
- (Saudi Arabia national football team) Yasser Al-Qahtani
- (Uzbekistan national football team) Alexander Geynrikh
- (Uzbekistan national football team) Mirjalol Qosimov

Below are full goalscorer lists for each round:

- First round
- Second round
- Third round
- Fourth round
