= 2006 FIFA World Cup qualification =

Tournament details
- Dates: 6 September 2003 – 16 November 2005
- Teams: 197 (from 6 confederations)

Tournament statistics
- Matches played: 849
- Goals scored: 2,476 (2.92 per match)
- Attendance: 19,339,789 (22,779 per match)
- Top scorer(s): (Mexico) Jared Borgetti (14 goals)

The 2006 FIFA World Cup qualification competition was a series of tournaments organised by the six FIFA confederations. Each confederation – the AFC (Asia), CAF (Africa), CONCACAF (North, Central America and Caribbean), CONMEBOL (South America), OFC (Oceania), and UEFA (Europe) – was allocated a certain number of the 32 places at the tournament. A total of 197 teams entered the qualification process for the 2006 FIFA World Cup. In 2001 FIFA ended automatic qualification of the reigning champion, so that 2002 champions Brazil became first to participate in the qualifying tournament. The hosts (Germany) retained their automatic spot.

The original distribution of places between the six confederations called for Oceania to be given one full spot in the final 32; this idea was seen as virtually guaranteeing a place in the finals to Australia, by far the strongest footballing nation in the region. This decision was reconsidered in June 2003 and the previous distribution of places between Oceania and South America was restored.

The draw for five of the six qualification tournaments took place on 5 December 2003 in Frankfurt, whilst all of the members of the South American federation (CONMEBOL) competed in a single group. Qualification itself began in September 2003.

== Qualified teams ==
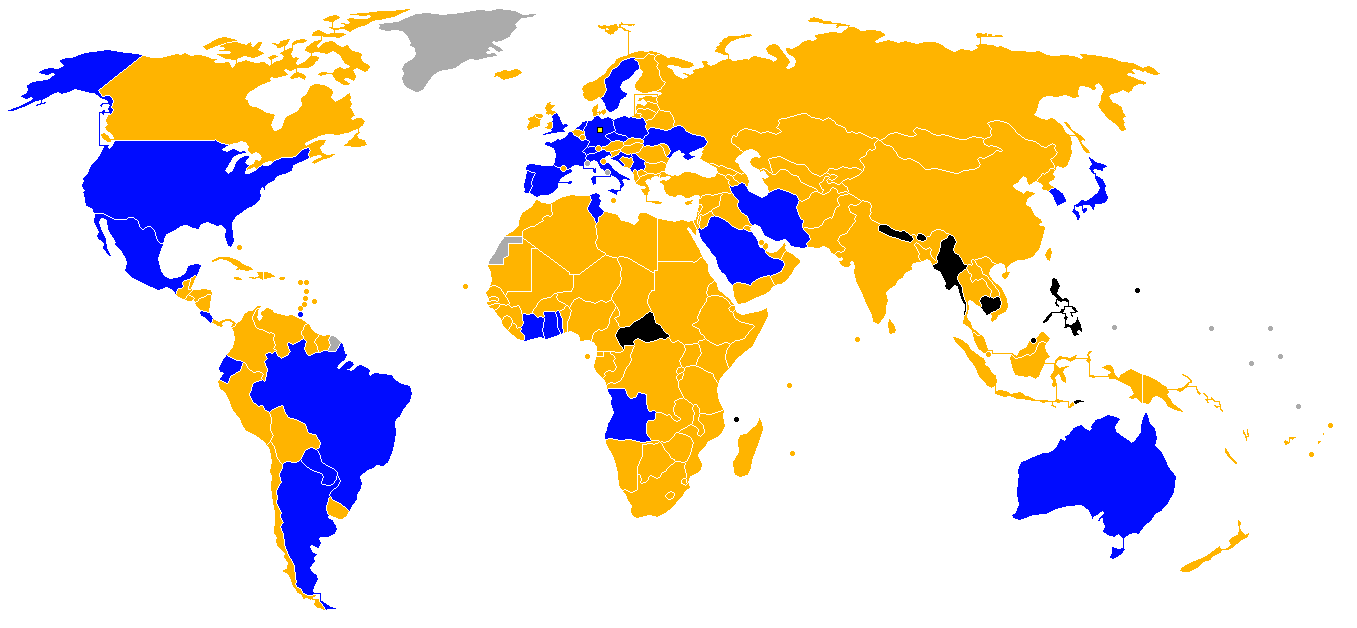
Country qualified for World Cup Country failed to qualify Country did not enter World Cup Country not a FIFA member

The following 32 teams qualified for the 2006 FIFA World Cup:

Team	Method of qualification	Date of qualification	Finals appearance	Consecutive finals appearances	Previous best performance	FIFA Ranking at start of event
Germany	Host	6 July 2000	16th ^{(1)}	14	Winners (1954, 1974, 1990)	19
Japan	AFC third round Group 2 winners	8 June 2005	3rd	3	Round of 16 (2002)	18
Saudi Arabia	AFC third round Group 1 winners	8 June 2005	4th	4	Round of 16 (1994)	34
South Korea	AFC third round Group 1 runners-up	8 June 2005	7th	6	Fourth place (2002)	29
Iran	AFC third round Group 2 runners-up	8 June 2005	3rd	1 (last: 1998)	Group stage (1978, 1998)	23
Argentina	CONMEBOL runners-up	8 June 2005	14th	9	Winners (1978, 1986)	9
Ukraine	UEFA Group 2 winners	3 September 2005	1st	—	—	45
United States	CONCACAF fourth round winners	3 September 2005	8th	5	Third place (1930)	5
Brazil	CONMEBOL winners	5 September 2005	18th	18	Winners (1958, 1962, 1970, 1994, 2002)	1
Mexico	CONCACAF fourth round runners-up	7 September 2005	13th	4	Quarter-finals (1970, 1986)	4
Ghana	CAF second round Group 2 winners	8 October 2005	1st	—	—	48
Togo	CAF second round Group 1 winners	8 October 2005	1st	—	—	61
England	UEFA Group 6 winners	8 October 2005	12th	3	Winners (1966)	10
Poland	UEFA Group 6 runners-up	8 October 2005	7th	2	Third place (1974, 1982)	29
Angola	CAF second round Group 4 winners	8 October 2005	1st	—	—	57
Ivory Coast	CAF second round Group 3 winners	8 October 2005	1st	—	—	32
Tunisia	CAF second round Group 5 winners	8 October 2005	4th	3	Group stage (1978, 1998, 2002)	21
Croatia	UEFA Group 8 winners	8 October 2005	3rd	3	Third place (1998)	23
Netherlands	UEFA Group 1 winners	8 October 2005	8th	1 (last: 1998)	Runners-up (1974, 1978)	3
Italy	UEFA Group 5 winners	8 October 2005	16th	12	Winners (1934, 1938, 1982)	13
Portugal	UEFA Group 3 winners	8 October 2005	4th	2	Third place (1966)	7
Costa Rica	CONCACAF fourth round third place	8 October 2005	3rd	2	Round of 16 (1990)	26
Ecuador	CONMEBOL third place	8 October 2005	2nd	2	Group stage (2002)	39
Paraguay	CONMEBOL fourth place	8 October 2005	7th	3	Round of 16 (1986, 1998, 2002)	33
Sweden	UEFA Group 8 runners-up	12 October 2005	11th	2	Runners-up (1958)	16
Serbia and Montenegro	UEFA Group 7 winners	12 October 2005	10th ^{(3)}	1 (last: 1998)	Fourth place (1930, 1962)	44
France	UEFA Group 4 winners	12 October 2005	12th	3	Winners (1998)	8
Australia	CONMEBOL v OFC Play-off winners	16 November 2005	2nd	1 (last: 1974)	Group stage (1974)	42
Trinidad and Tobago	AFC v CONCACAF Play-off winners	16 November 2005	1st	—	—	47
Czech Republic	UEFA Play-off winners	16 November 2005	9th ^{(4)}	1 (last: 1990)	Runners-up (1934, 1962)	2
Spain	UEFA Play-off winners	16 November 2005	12th	8	Fourth place (1950)	5
Switzerland	UEFA Play-off winners	16 November 2005	8th	1 (last: 1994)	Quarter-finals (1934, 1938, 1954)	35

^{1}Includes 10 appearances by DFB representing West Germany between 1954 and 1990. Excludes 1 appearance by DVF representing East Germany between 1954 and 1990.

^{3}Includes appearances by pre-division Yugoslavia, as FIFA considers Serbia and Montenegro as a successor of a team.

^{4}Includes appearances by Czechoslovakia, as FIFA considers both the Czech Republic and Slovakia as a successor of a team.

== Qualification process ==
A total of 197 teams entered the qualification process for the 2006 FIFA World Cup, competing for a total of 32 spots in the final tournament. Germany, as the host, qualified automatically, leaving 31 spots open for competition.

Starting with these qualifiers, the defending champion (Brazil) was not granted automatic qualification for the first time. FIFA announced the decision in December 2001 at the draw for the 2002 Finals Tournament. The official reason was that the friendly matches to which previous champions were restricted provided inferior preparation to the competitive qualification matches others would have played. Media also noted that the change released an extra place for the contentious distribution of places by confederation.

The final distribution was as follows:

The distribution by confederation for the 2006 FIFA World Cup was:

- AFC (Asia): 4 or 5 places
- CAF (Africa): 5 places
- CONCACAF (North, Central American and Caribbean): 3 or 4 places
- CONMEBOL (South America): 4 or 5 places
- OFC (Oceania): 0 or 1 place(s)
- UEFA (Europe): 13 places (+ Germany qualified automatically as host nation for a total of 14 places)

UEFA and CAF have a guaranteed number of places, whereas the number of qualifiers from other confederations is dependent on play-offs between AFC's fifth-placed team and CONMEBOL's fifth-placed team, and between CONCACAF's fourth-placed team and OFC's first-placed team. A draw determined the pairings between the four teams involved.

=== Summary of qualification ===
Confederation	Available slots in finals	Teams started	Teams eliminated	Teams qualified	Qualifying start date	Qualifying end date
AFC	4 or 5	38	34	4	19 November 2003	16 November 2005
CAF	5	51	46	5	10 October 2003	8 October 2005
CONCACAF	3 or 4	34	30	4	18 February 2004	16 November 2005
CONMEBOL	4 or 5	10	6	4	6 September 2003	20 November 2005
OFC	0 or 1	12	11	1	10 May 2004	16 November 2005
UEFA	13+1	51+1	38	13+1	18 August 2004	16 November 2005
Total	31+1	196+1	165	31+1	6 September 2003	16 November 2005

=== Tiebreakers ===
For FIFA World Cup qualifying stages using a league format, the method used for separating teams level on points is the same for all Confederations. The rules for separating teams level on points are decided by FIFA and can be found in article 18 part 6d to 6g of the FIFA Regulations 2006 World Cup Germany

If teams are even on points at the end of group play, the tied teams will be ranked by:

1. greatest number of points obtained in the group matches between the teams concerned
2. goal difference resulting from the group matches between the teams concerned
3. greatest number of goals scored in the group matches between the teams concerned
4. goal difference in all group matches
5. greatest number of goals scored in all group matches
6. a play-off on neutral ground. If, after 90 minutes, this match ends in a draw, extra time of twice 15 minutes will be played. If the score is level after extra time, penalty kicks will be taken to determine the winner.

For FIFA World Cup qualifying stages using a home-and-away knockout format, the team that has the higher aggregate score over the two legs progresses to the next round. In the event that aggregate scores finish level, the away goals rule is applied, i.e. the team that scored more goals away from home over the two legs progresses. If away goals are also equal, then thirty minutes of extra time are played, divided into two fifteen-minutes halves. The away goals rule is again applied after extra time, i.e. if there are goals scored during extra time and the aggregate score is still level, the visiting team qualifies by virtue of more away goals scored. If no goals are scored during extra time, the tie is decided by penalty shoot-out.

This is a change from the 2002 FIFA World Cup, where total goal difference was the first tiebreaker.

A total of 194 teams played at least one qualifying match. A total of 847 qualifying matches were played, and 2464 goals were scored (an average of 2.91 per match).

== Confederation qualification ==
=== AFC ===
44 Asian teams are affiliated with FIFA, but Cambodia, Philippines, Bhutan and Brunei decided not to take part, and Myanmar was banned from the competition, so a total of 39 teams took part, competing for 4.5 places in the World Cup.

The qualification was composed of three rounds.

- First Round: The 14 last ranked teams according to FIFA were paired 2-by-2 and played home-and-away knock-out matches.
- Second Round: The 7 winners joined the other 25 teams where those 32 teams were divided in 8 groups of four teams each. The teams in each group would play against each other home-and-away, and the team with most points in each group would advance to the Third Round.
- Third Round: The 8 remaining teams were divided in two groups of 4 teams each, that would again play against each other in a home-and-away basis. The two teams with most points in each group would qualify to the World Cup. The two third placed teams would play-off against each other home-and-away. Winner of this play-off would play against the fourth placed team in the final round of CONCACAF in an intercontinental play-off for a place in the World Cup.

==== Final positions (third round) ====
Group 1
Pos	Team	Pld	Pts
1	Saudi Arabia	6	14
2	South Korea	6	10
3	Uzbekistan	6	5
4	Kuwait	6	4

Group 2
Pos	Team	Pld	Pts
1	Japan	6	15
2	Iran	6	13
3	Bahrain	6	4
4	North Korea	6	3

==== Play-off for 5th place (fourth round) ====
Team 1	Agg.	Team 2	1st leg	2nd leg
Uzbekistan	1–1 (a)	Bahrain	1–1	0–0

Bahrain advanced to the AFC–CONCACAF play-off on the away goals rule.

=== CAF ===
The qualification was composed of two Rounds. 9 teams entered the competition directly on the second round: the 5 teams that qualified for the 2002 World Cup Finals (Cameroon, Nigeria, Senegal, South Africa, and Tunisia) and the 4 highest-ranking teams in the June 25, 2003 FIFA world rankings (Congo DR, Ivory Coast, Egypt, and Morocco). The other 42 teams were paired 2-by-2 and played knock-out matches home-and-away. The 21 winners would advance to the second round.

In the second round, the 30 teams were divided in 5 groups of 6 teams each. Teams in each group would play against each other in a home-and-away basis. The team with most points in each group would qualify to the World Cup.

The competition also constituted the qualification competition for the 2006 African Nations Cup with the top three nations of each group qualifying (except for Egypt, which qualifies as the host nation, the fourth nation in Egypt's group qualifying in Egypt's place).

The African qualifying zone saw 4 out of 5 finals places going to World Cup debutants (Angola, Togo, Ivory Coast and Ghana). Nigeria missed out on a fourth consecutive finals appearance while Cameroon did not reach their fifth consecutive finals.

The African zone also featured a group of death – Group 3 – which brought together Africa's most frequent World Cup qualifier Cameroon with the two eventual finalists of the 2006 Africa Cup of Nations: Egypt and the Ivory Coast.

==== Final positions (second round) ====
Group 1
Group 2
Group 3

Pos	Team	Pld	Pts
1	Togo	10	23
2	Senegal	10	21
3	Zambia	10	19
4	Congo	10	10
5	Mali	10	8
6	Liberia	10	4

Pos	Team	Pld	Pts
1	Ghana	10	21
2	DR Congo	10	16
3	South Africa	10	16
4	Burkina Faso	10	13
5	Cape Verde	10	10
6	Uganda	10	8

Pos	Team	Pld	Pts
1	Ivory Coast	10	22
2	Cameroon	10	21
3	Egypt	10	17
4	Libya	10	12
5	Sudan	10	6
6	Benin	10	5

Group 4
Group 5

Pos	Team	Pld	Pts
1	Angola	10	21
2	Nigeria	10	21
3	Zimbabwe	10	15
4	Gabon	10	10
5	Algeria	10	8
6	Rwanda	10	5

Pos	Team	Pld	Pts
1	Tunisia	10	21
2	Morocco	10	20
3	Guinea	10	17
4	Kenya	10	10
5	Botswana	10	9
6	Malawi	10	6

=== CONCACAF ===
The qualification process was divided in three stages. In the first stage, the 34 teams were divided in 10 groups of three teams each and two groups of two teams each. Groups with three teams had two rounds, with the best ranked team according to FIFA in each group entering the competition in the second round. In each group, teams were paired 2-by-2 and played home-and-away matches.

The 12 winners of the first stage advanced to the second stage, where they were divided into three groups of four teams each. Teams in each group would play against each other home-and-away, and the two teams with most points in each group would advance to the final round.

In the third stage, the six teams were put in a single group, and played against each other home-and-away. The three teams with most points qualified to the World Cup. The fourth placed team advanced to the AFC–CONCACAF play-off against the winner of a play-off between third placed teams in the Third Round of Asia.

==== Final positions (fourth round) ====
Pos	Team	Pld	Pts
1	United States	10	22
2	Mexico	10	22
3	Costa Rica	10	16
4	Trinidad and Tobago	10	13
5	Guatemala	10	11
6	Panama	10	2

=== CONMEBOL ===
10 teams took part, all in a single group. The rules were very simple: the teams would play against each other in a home-and-away basis, with the four teams with most points qualifying to the 2006 FIFA World Cup. The fifth ranked team would have to play-off against the best team from Oceania, with the winner of this play-off also qualifying. For the first time, Brazil, the defending champion, was required to go through qualification and was not automatically qualified for the tournament.

==== Final positions ====
Pos	Team	Pld	Pts
1	Brazil	18	34
2	Argentina	18	34
3	Ecuador	18	28
4	Paraguay	18	28
5	Uruguay	18	25
6	Colombia	18	24
7	Chile	18	22
8	Venezuela	18	18
9	Peru	18	18
10	Bolivia	18	14

=== OFC ===
12 teams took part, competing for a place in the intercontinental play-off against the fifth-placed team from South America. The winner of this play-off qualified for the World Cup.

==== Final positions (second round) ====
In the Second round, the six teams were put in a single group, and played against each other once. The two teams with most points advanced to a play-off, and played against each other home and away. The winner of this play-off advanced to the intercontinental play-off.

Pos	Team	Pld	Pts
1	Australia	5	13
2	Solomon Islands	5	10
3	New Zealand	5	9
4	Fiji	5	4
5	Tahiti	5	4
6	Vanuatu	5	3

==== Final round ====
Australia and the Solomon Islands progressed to the final stage.

Team 1	Agg.	Team 2	1st leg	2nd leg
Australia	9–1	Solomon Islands	7–0	2–1

=== UEFA ===
A total of 51 teams took part, divided in 8 groups (five groups of six teams each and three groups of seven teams each) competing for 13 places in the World Cup. Germany, the hosts, were already qualified, for a total of 14 European places in the tournament. The qualifying process started on 18 August 2004, over a month after the end of UEFA Euro 2004, and ended on 16 November 2005.

The teams in each group would play against each other in a home and away basis. The team with most points in each group would qualify to the World Cup. The runners up would be ranked. As some groups had seven teams and others had six, results against the seventh placed team were ignored. The two best ranked runners up would also qualify to the World Cup. The other six runners up were drawn into three home and away knock out matches, winners of those matches also qualifying.

Group 1

Pos	Team	Pld	Pts
1	Netherlands	12	32
2	Czech Republic	12	27
3	Romania	12	25
4	Finland	12	16
5	Macedonia	12	9
6	Armenia	12	7
7	Andorra	12	5

Group 2

Pos	Team	Pld	Pts
1	Ukraine	12	25
2	Turkey	12	23
3	Denmark	12	22
4	Greece	12	21
5	Albania	12	13
6	Georgia	12	10
7	Kazakhstan	12	1

Group 3

Pos	Team	Pld	Pts
1	Portugal	12	30
2	Slovakia	12	23
3	Russia	12	23
4	Estonia	12	17
5	Latvia	12	15
6	Liechtenstein	12	8
7	Luxembourg	12	0

Group 4

Pos	Team	Pld	Pts
1	France	10	20
2	Switzerland	10	18
3	Israel	10	18
4	Republic of Ireland	10	17
5	Cyprus	10	4
6	Faroe Islands	10	1

Group 5

Pos	Team	Pld	Pts
1	Italy	10	23
2	Norway	10	18
3	Scotland	10	13
4	Slovenia	10	12
5	Belarus	10	10
6	Moldova	10	5

Group 6

Pos	Team	Pld	Pts
1	England	10	25
2	Poland	10	24
3	Austria	10	15
4	Northern Ireland	10	9
5	Wales	10	8
6	Azerbaijan	10	3

Group 7

Pos	Team	Pld	Pts
1	Serbia and Montenegro	10	22
2	Spain	10	20
3	Bosnia and Herzegovina	10	16
4	Belgium	10	12
5	Lithuania	10	10
6	San Marino	10	0

Group 8

Pos	Team	Pld	Pts
1	Croatia	10	24
2	Sweden	10	24
3	Bulgaria	10	15
4	Hungary	10	14
5	Iceland	10	4
6	Malta	10	3

==== Play-offs ====
Poland and Sweden qualified directly to the World Cup. The other teams had to play in the playoffs.

Pos	Grp	Team	Pld	W	D	L	GF	GA	GD	Pts	Qualification
1	8	Sweden	10	8	0	2	30	4	+26	24	Qualification to 2006 FIFA World Cup
2	6	Poland	10	8	0	2	27	9	+18	24	Qualification to 2006 FIFA World Cup
3	1	Czech Republic	10	7	0	3	23	11	+12	21	Advance to second round (play-offs)
4	7	Spain	10	5	5	0	19	3	+16	20	Advance to second round (play-offs)
5	4	Switzerland	10	4	6	0	18	7	+11	18	Advance to second round (play-offs)
6	5	Norway	10	5	3	2	12	7	+5	18	Advance to second round (play-offs)
7	3	Slovakia	10	4	5	1	17	7	+10	17	Advance to second round (play-offs)
8	2	Turkey	10	4	5	1	13	9	+4	17	Advance to second round (play-offs)

A draw was held on 14 October 2005 at FIFA headquarters in Zürich to pair each team from Pot 1 with a team from Pot 2. A second draw at the same time and location determined the order of the fixtures.

Team 1	Agg.	Team 2	1st leg	2nd leg
Spain	6–2	Slovakia	5–1	1–1
Switzerland	4–4 (a)	Turkey	2–0	2–4
Norway	0–2	Czech Republic	0–1	0–1

== Inter-confederation play-offs ==
There were two scheduled inter-confederation playoffs to determine the final two qualification spots to the finals. The first legs were played on 12 November 2005, and the second legs were played on 16 November 2005.

=== CONCACAF v AFC ===
Team 1	Agg.	Team 2	1st leg	2nd leg
Trinidad and Tobago	2–1	Bahrain	1–1	1–0

=== CONMEBOL v OFC ===
Team 1	Agg.	Team 2	1st leg	2nd leg
Uruguay	1–1 (2–4 p)	Australia	1–0	0–1 (a.e.t.)

== Withdrawals ==
- Central African Republic
- Guam
- Nepal

== Did not enter ==
- Bhutan
- Brunei
- Cambodia
- Comoros
- Djibouti
- Philippines
- Puerto Rico
- Timor-Leste

== Excluded ==
- Myanmar (for refusing to play a qualifier in Iran during 2002 qualifying)

== Top goalscorers ==
There were 2,476 goals scored in 849 matches, for an average of 2.92 goals per match.

14 goals

- (Mexico) Jared Borgetti

12 goals

- (Trinidad and Tobago) Stern John

11 goals

- (Mexico) Jaime Lozano
- (Portugal) Pauleta
- (Togo) Emmanuel Adebayor

10 goals

- (Brazil) Ronaldo
- (Guatemala) Carlos Ruiz
- (Mexico) Francisco Fonseca

9 goals

- (Ivory Coast) Didier Drogba
- (Czech Republic) Jan Koller
- (Iran) Ali Daei

8 goals

- (Costa Rica) Paulo Wanchope
- (Finland) Alexei Eremenko
- (Nigeria) Obafemi Martins
- (Sweden) Zlatan Ibrahimović

Below are goalscorer lists for all confederations and the inter-confederation play-offs:

- AFC
- CAF
- CONCACAF
- CONMEBOL
- OFC
- UEFA
- Inter-confederation play-offs
