= 2006 FIFA World Cup qualification – UEFA second round =

Football tournament qualification stage

The 2006 FIFA World Cup European qualification playoffs were a set of home-and-away playoffs to decide the final three places granted to national football teams from European nations (more precisely, UEFA members) for the 2006 FIFA World Cup.

The playoffs were decided by the standard FIFA method of aggregate score, with away goals and, if necessary, extra time with the possibility of a penalty shoot-out at the end of the second leg. The winner of each playoff was awarded a place in the 2006 FIFA World Cup.

== Qualified teams ==
Because some groups had six teams and others had seven, matches against the 7th placed team were discarded. The two best ranked runners-up also qualified to the World Cup. The other six runners-up were drawn into three two-legged knock out matches.

Pos	Grp	Team	Pld	W	D	L	GF	GA	GD	Pts	Qualification
1	8	Sweden	10	8	0	2	30	4	+26	24	Qualification to 2006 FIFA World Cup
2	6	Poland	10	8	0	2	27	9	+18	24	Qualification to 2006 FIFA World Cup
3	1	Czech Republic	10	7	0	3	23	11	+12	21	Advance to second round (play-offs)
4	7	Spain	10	5	5	0	19	3	+16	20	Advance to second round (play-offs)
5	4	Switzerland	10	4	6	0	18	7	+11	18	Advance to second round (play-offs)
6	5	Norway	10	5	3	2	12	7	+5	18	Advance to second round (play-offs)
7	3	Slovakia	10	4	5	1	17	7	+10	17	Advance to second round (play-offs)
8	2	Turkey	10	4	5	1	13	9	+4	17	Advance to second round (play-offs)

== Seeding and draw ==
By the rules of the UEFA qualifying tournament, the first-place finishers in each of eight groups received automatic berths, along with the two second-place teams that had earned the most points against teams in the top six of their individual groups.

The six remaining second-place teams were divided into two pots based on their standings in the September 2005 FIFA World Rankings. The division was:

Pot 1 (seeded)
Team	Rank
Czech Republic	4
Spain	8
Turkey	12

Pot 2 (unseeded)
Team	Rank
Norway	37
Switzerland	38
Slovakia	45

A draw was held on 14 October 2005 at FIFA headquarters in Zürich to pair each team from Pot 1 with a team from Pot 2. A second draw at the same time and location determined the order of the fixtures.

== Matches ==
Team 1	Agg.	Team 2	1st leg	2nd leg
Spain	6–2	Slovakia	5–1	1–1
Switzerland	4–4 (a)	Turkey	2–0	2–4
Norway	0–2	Czech Republic	0–1	0–1

12 November 2005
22:00 CET

Spain	5–1	Slovakia
García 10', 18', 74'; Torres 65' (pen.); Morientes 79'	Report	Németh 49'

Vicente Calderón Stadium, Madrid
Attendance: 47,210
Referee: Massimo De Santis (Italy)
16 November 2005
20:15 CET

Slovakia	1–1	Spain
Hološko 50'	Report	Villa 71'

Tehelné pole, Bratislava
Attendance: 23,587
Referee: Markus Merk (Germany)

Spain won 6–2 on aggregate.

12 November 2005
20:45 CET

Switzerland	2–0	Turkey
Senderos 41'; Behrami 86'	Report

Wankdorf, Bern
Attendance: 31,130
Referee: Ľuboš Micheľ (Slovakia)
16 November 2005
20:15 EET

Turkey	4–2	Switzerland
Tuncay 22', 38', 89'; Necati 52' (pen.)	Report	Frei 2' (pen.); Streller 84'

Şükrü Saracoğlu Stadium, Istanbul
Attendance: 42,000
Referee: Frank De Bleeckere (Belgium)

4–4 on aggregate. Switzerland won on away goals.

12 November 2005
19:30 CET

Norway	0–1	Czech Republic
	Report	Šmicer 31'

Ullevaal Stadion, Oslo
Attendance: 24,264
Referee: Massimo Busacca (Switzerland)
16 November 2005
20:15 CET

Czech Republic	1–0	Norway
Rosický 35'	Report

Toyota Arena, Prague
Attendance: 17,464
Referee: Graham Poll (England)

Czech Republic won 2–0 on aggregate.

== Goalscorers ==
There were 18 goals scored in 6 matches, for an average of 3 goals per match.

3 goals

- (Spain) Luis García
- (Turkey) Tuncay

1 goal

- (Czech Republic) Vladimír Šmicer
- (Czech Republic) Tomáš Rosický
- (Slovakia) Filip Hološko
- (Slovakia) Szilárd Németh
- (Spain) Fernando Morientes
- (Spain) Fernando Torres
- (Spain) David Villa
- (Switzerland) Valon Behrami
- (Switzerland) Alexander Frei
- (Switzerland) Philippe Senderos
- (Switzerland) Marco Streller
- (Turkey) Necati Ateş
