= Alexander Frei =

Swiss footballer (born 1979)

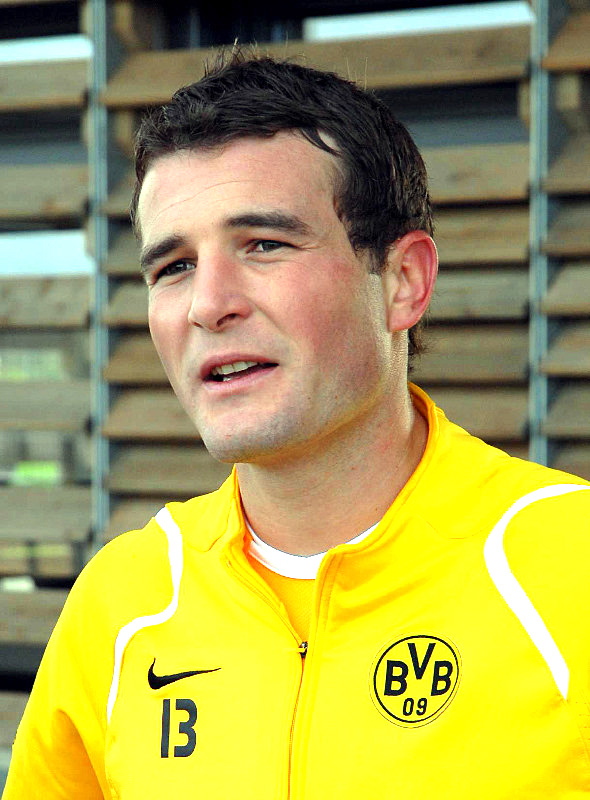
- Frei with Borussia Dortmund in 2007

Personal information
- Full name: Alexander Frei
- Date of birth: 15 July 1979 (age 47)
- Place of birth: Basel, Switzerland
- Height: 1.79 m (5 ft 10 in)
- Position: Striker

Youth career
- 1987–1988: FC Begnins
- 1988–1995: FC Aesch
- 1995–1997: Basel

Senior career*
Years	Team	Apps	(Gls)
1997–1998	Basel	11	(1)
1998–1999	Thun	32	(6)
1999–2000	FC Luzern	53	(17)
2001–2003	Servette	64	(36)
2003–2006	Rennes	100	(47)
2006–2009	Borussia Dortmund	74	(34)
2009–2013	Basel	103	(73)
Total		437	(213)

International career
1995–1996	Switzerland U-18	5	(1)
1996–1997	Switzerland U-19	4	(3)
1999–2000	Switzerland U-21	19	(9)
2001–2011	Switzerland	84	(42)

Managerial career
- 2013–2014: FC Luzern (sporting director)
- 2015–2020: Basel (youth)
- 2018: Basel (interim)
- 2020–2021: Wil
- 2021–2022: Winterthur
- 2022–2023: Basel
- 2023–2024: Aarau
- * Club domestic league appearances and goals

Alexander Frei (born 15 July 1979), commonly known as Alex Frei, is a Swiss professional football coach and a former striker. He was most recently head coach of FC Aarau in the Swiss Challenge League, the second tier of Swiss football.

Frei began his career at Basel, going on to various other clubs in Switzerland, France and Germany before returning to his home club, where he won the Swiss Super League title in all four of his seasons, including doubles with the Swiss Cup in 2010 and 2012.

Frei is the all-time leading scorer of the Switzerland national team with 42 goals in 84 games. He represented the country at two UEFA European Championships and as many World Cups.

== Club career ==
Frei started his professional career with his hometown club of FC Basel, where he later was transferred to FC Thun, FC Luzern, and Servette FC, all in his native Switzerland. After a transfer to French club Rennes, he finished as the highest goal-scorer in Ligue 1 for the 2004–05 season with 20 goals. He was named Swiss Footballer of the Year the same season. He was also named Swiss Footballer of the Year in 2004 and 2007.

Frei then signed a four-year contract with Borussia Dortmund on 29 June 2006. Dortmund paid a transfer fee of approximately €5 million for him. In the 2006–07 season, Frei was the highest goal scorer for Borussia Dortmund with 16 goals in 32 matches.

He recovered from a long-term injury in the 2007–08 season to score six times in his last eight appearances for Borussia Dortmund. After speculation regarding his future, he came back to action against Schalke 04 in the fourth fixture of the Bundesliga. He scored two goals, equalising in an incredible game.

On 17 July 2009, he left Borussia Dortmund after 74 league matches and, after six years, returned to Switzerland to sign with FC Basel. He made his debut in a 2–1 win over FC Sion on 26 July 2009. He made an assist and also scored the last minute winner in the match at the Stade Tourbillon. During the 2009–10 season he scored 15 goals in 19 league games and FC Basel won the Double. During the 2010–11 season he scored 27 goals in 35 league games, becoming the Swiss League Top goalscorer.

At the end of the 2011–12 season, Frei won his second Double with Basel, the League Championship title and the Swiss Cup.

In the 2012–13 UEFA Europa League, Basel advanced as far as the semi-finals, there being matched against the reigning UEFA Champions League holders Chelsea, but were knocked out being beaten 2–5 on aggregate. Frei's last game in this competition was as Basel qualified for the quarter-finals in the home game against Tottenham Hotspur, whom they beat 4–1 on penalties after a 4–4 aggregate draw to progress. Frei played his last professional match on 14 April 2013 in the home game at St. Jakob-Park as Basel beat Zürich 3–1. He led the team as captain for this game. He also scored his last goal, a free kick from about 25 meters in the 55th minute. He was substituted some ten minutes later to a standing ovation. At the end of the Swiss Super League season 2012–13, Frei was awarded his fourth championship medal and was awarded a Swiss Cup silver medal.

Between the years from 1997 to 1998 and again from 2009 to 2013 Frei played a total of 217 games for Basel scoring a total of 148 goals. 114 of these games were in the Swiss Super League, 15 in the Swiss Cup, 38 in the European competitions (Champions League and Europa League) and 50 were friendly games. He scored 74 goals in the domestic league, 13 in the cup, 22 in the European matches and the other 39 were scored during the test games. With the club he won four league championships and two cup titles.

== International career ==
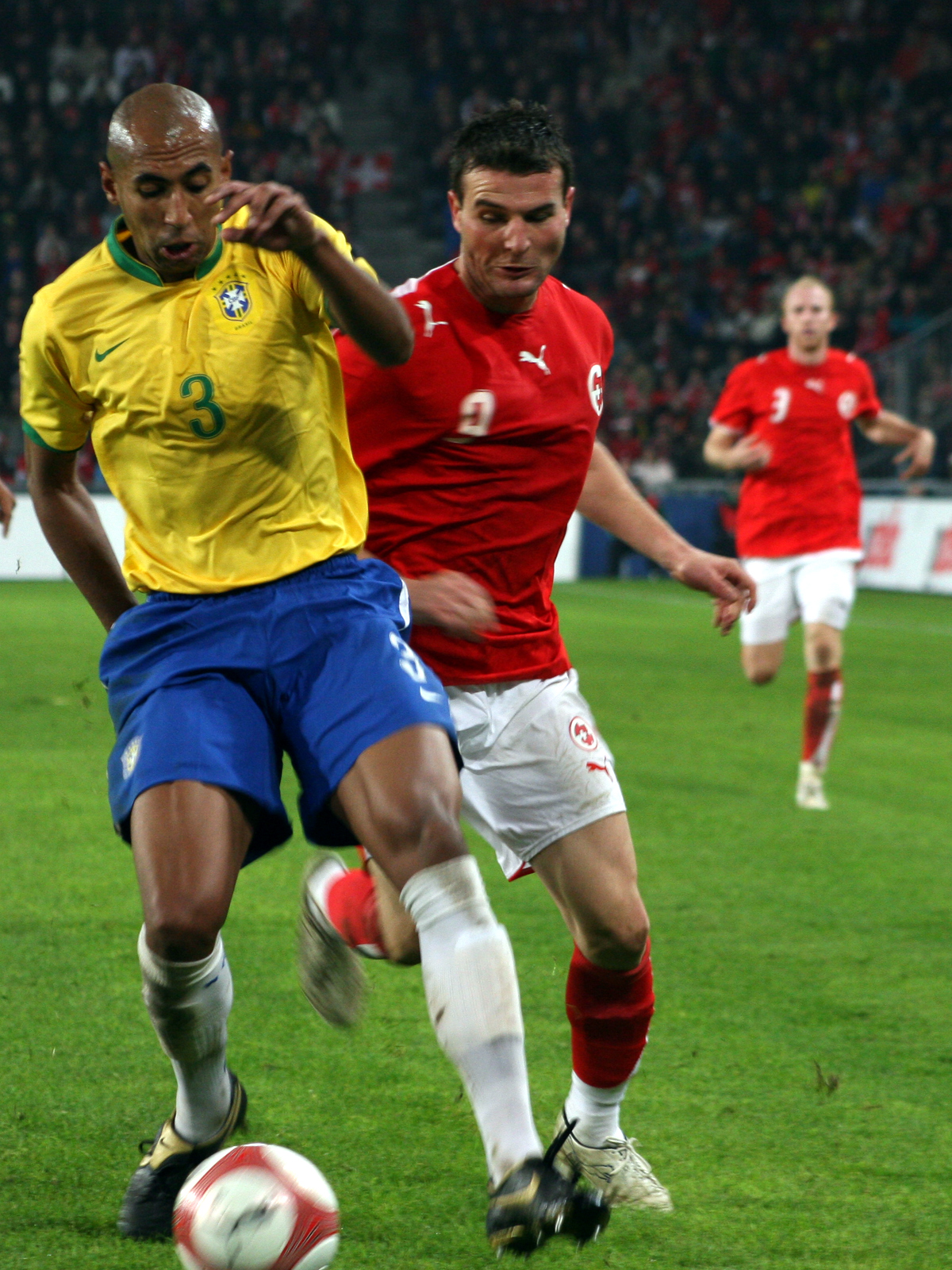
Frei battling for the ball with Brazil's Luisão in a November 2006 friendly

Frei represented Switzerland at Under-18s, Under-19s and Under-21s levels. He played his Swiss U-18s debut on 25 October 1995 in the 5-1 away defeat against the French Under-18s. His Under-21 debut was on 3 September 1999 in the 3-1 away win against Denmark.

Frei played his debut as full international on 24 March 2001, being substituted in, during the 1–1 away draw against the FR Yugoslavia during the World Cup qualification Group 1 match. In the following match, four days later, Frei scored his first three goals for the national team in the 5–0 home win against Luxembourg.

Frei played for Switzerland at Euro 2004. In a group match against England, he was caught on camera appearing to spit at Steven Gerrard. Although no action was taken at the time, Frei was later charged and given a provisional 15-day suspension by UEFA.

He scored six times in 2006 FIFA World Cup qualification, including a second-minute penalty in the second leg of the play-off against Turkey which his team won on away goals. At the finals in Germany, Frei was Man of the match in the 2–0 group stage win over Togo in Dortmund, opening the scoring from Tranquillo Barnetta's 17th-minute cross. He concluded a win by the same score against South Korea in the next game to send Switzerland through as group winners. This goal was controversial as referee Horacio Elizondo overruled a judgement of offside by his assistant.

On 30 May 2008, in Switzerland's final preparation match before co-hosting UEFA Euro 2008, Frei scored twice in a 3–0 friendly win over Liechtenstein. This moved him to 35 goals for the Switzerland national team, surpassing the record of Kubilay Türkyilmaz. However, within the first half of the opening match of the tournament, Frei was injured while captaining the Swiss team and missed the rest of the tournament due to a torn knee ligament in his left knee after a challenge from Czech defender Zdeněk Grygera. He decided to remain with the team to show his support. He later underwent surgery.

In a Euro 2012 qualifier at home against Wales, he was booed by his own fans throughout the match, even though Switzerland won the match 4–1. When he was finally substituted the fans in the home sector booed him repeatedly. On 5 April 2011, he decided to quit from the national squad after being criticised again following a 0–0 draw with Bulgaria on 26 March for the Euro 2012 qualifying match.

== Sports director ==
After Frei ended his career, he became new sports director of FC Luzern. This was announced by both FC Basel and Luzern on 19 March 2013.

== Coaching career ==
He was interim manager of FC Basel in 2018. In September 2020, he became head coach of FC Wil 1900. He stepped down from this position in November 2021 and in December signed on as head coach of FC Winterthur. After successfully leading Winterthur to promotion to the Super League, he was signed by his former club FC Basel to be their new head coach. Frei and Basel parted ways on 7 February 2023, with the team sitting in seventh place in the table. According to FC Basel sporting director Heiko Vogel the 0–1 loss away to Grasshopper Club Zürich, following five league games without a win, on 4 February 2023, three days before, "was one defeat too many". On 1 February 2023, Basel had defeated Grasshoppers 5–3 in Zurich in their round of 16 match of the 2022–23 Swiss Cup. On 12 June 2023, he was announced as the new head coach of FC Aarau, thus returning to the Swiss Challenge League. On 25 March 2024, he departed his position by mutual consent with the club to take a step back from coaching. At the time of his departure, Aarau were in 3rd place, however with a significant gap to a promotion spot. In his last game, his team managed a late 2–0 win against cantonal rivals FC Baden.

== Personal life ==
Alexander is of no relation to club and country team mate Fabian Frei. However, he is the second-cousin of Seattle Sounders FC goalkeeper and former Swiss youth international Stefan Frei. His younger sister Andrea plays football for the Basel ladies team. He is married to Nina and they have a daughter born in 2012.

== Career statistics ==
=== Club ===
Appearances and goals by club, season and competition
Club	Season	League			National cup (Note: Includes Coupe de France, DFB-Pokal, Swiss Cup)		League cup (Note: Includes Coupe de la Ligue)		Europe		Total	
Club	Season	Division	Apps	Goals	Apps	Goals	Apps	Goals	Apps	Goals	Apps	Goals
Rennes	2003–04	Ligue 1	28	20	3	1	1	0	—		32	21
Rennes	2004–05	Ligue 1	36	20	2	0	0	0	—		38	20
Rennes	2005–06	Ligue 1	23	7	1	0	1	0	6 (Note: Appearances in UEFA Cup)	2	29	9
Rennes	Total		87	47	6	1	2	0	6	2	97	50
Borussia Dortmund	2006–07	Bundesliga	32	16	2	1	—		—		34	17
Borussia Dortmund	2007–08	Bundesliga	13	6	3	0	—		—		16	6
Borussia Dortmund	2008–09	Bundesliga	29	12	2	2	—		2	0	33	14
Borussia Dortmund	Total		74	34	7	3	—		2	0	82	37
FC Basel	2009–10	Swiss Super League	19	15	5	4	—		10 (Note: Appearances in UEFA Europa League)	8	34	27
FC Basel	2010–11	Swiss Super League	35	27	2	0	—		11 (Note: Nine appearances and five goals in UEFA Champions League, two appearances and one goal in UEFA Europa League)	6	48	33
FC Basel	2011–12	Swiss Super League	31	24	5	4	—		7 (Note: Appearances in UEFA Champions League)	5	43	33
FC Basel	2012–13	Swiss Super League	18	7	3	4	—		10 (Note: Four appearances and two goals in UEFA Champions League, six appearances and one goal in UEFA Europa League)	3	31	14
FC Basel	Total		103	73	15	12	—		38	22	156	107
Career total			264	154	28	16	2	0	46	24	340	194

=== International ===
Appearances and goals by national team and year
National team	Year	Apps	Goals
Switzerland	2001	8	5
Switzerland	2002	6	2
Switzerland	2003	8	7
Switzerland	2004	9	2
Switzerland	2005	11	7
Switzerland	2006	11	8
Switzerland	2007	3	1
Switzerland	2008	8	5
Switzerland	2009	9	3
Switzerland	2010	9	2
Switzerland	2011	2	0
Total		84	42

Scores and results list Switzerland's goal tally first, score column indicates score after each Frei goal.

List of international goals scored by Alexander Frei
No.	Date	Venue	Opponent	Score	Result	Competition
1	28 March 2001	Hardturm, Zürich, Switzerland	Luxembourg	1–0	5–0	2002 World Cup qualifier
2	28 March 2001	Hardturm, Zürich, Switzerland	Luxembourg	2–0	5–0	2002 World Cup qualifier
3	28 March 2001	Hardturm, Zürich, Switzerland	Luxembourg	5–0	5–0	2002 World Cup qualifier
4	2 June 2001	Svangaskarð, Toftir, Faroe	Faroe Islands	1–0	1–0	2002 World Cup qualifier
5	5 September 2001	Stade Josy Barthel, Luxembourg, Luxembourg	Luxembourg	1–0	3–0	2002 World Cup qualifier
6	21 August 2002	St. Jakob-Park, Basel, Switzerland	Austria	2–1	3–2	Friendly
7	8 September 2002	St. Jakob-Park, Basel, Switzerland	Georgia	1–0	4–1	Euro 2004 qualifier
8	12 February 2003	Športni Park, Nova Gorica, Slovenia	Slovenia	3–0	5–1	Friendly
9	12 February 2003	Športni Park, Nova Gorica, Slovenia	Slovenia	5–0	5–1	Friendly
10	30 April 2003	Stade de Genève, Geneva, Switzerland	Italy	1–0	1–2	Friendly
11	7 June 2003	St. Jakob-Park, Basel, Switzerland	Russia	1–0	2–2	Euro 2004 qualifier
12	7 June 2003	St. Jakob-Park, Basel, Switzerland	Russia	2–0	2–2	Euro 2004 qualifier
13	11 June 2003	Stade de Genève, Geneva, Switzerland	Albania	2–1	3–2	Euro 2004 qualifier
14	11 October 2003	St. Jakob-Park, Basel, Switzerland	Republic of Ireland	2–0	2–0	Euro 2004 qualifier
15	18 February 2004	Stade Moulay Abdellah, Rabat, Morocco	Morocco	1–2	1–2	Friendly
16	9 October 2004	Ramat Gan Stadium, Ramat Gan, Israel	Israel	1–1	2–2	2006 World Cup qualifier
17	30 March 2005	Hardturm, Zürich, Switzerland	Cyprus	1–0	1–0	2006 World Cup qualifier
18	4 June 2005	Svangaskarð, Toftir, Faroe	Faroe Islands	2–1	3–1	2006 World Cup qualifier
19	4 June 2005	Svangaskarð, Toftir, Faroe	Faroe Islands	3–1	3–1	2006 World Cup qualifier
20	17 August 2005	Ullevaal Stadion, Oslo, Norway	Norway	1–0	2–0	Friendly
21	3 September 2005	St. Jakob-Park, Basel, Switzerland	Israel	1–0	1–1	2006 World Cup qualifier
22	7 September 2005	GSP Stadium, Nicosia, Cyprus	Cyprus	1–0	3–1	2006 World Cup qualifier
23	16 November 2005	Şükrü Saracoğlu Stadium, Istanbul, Turkey	Turkey	1–0	2–4	2006 World Cup play-offs
24	3 June 2006	Hardturm, Zürich, Switzerland	China	1–0	4–1	Friendly
25	3 June 2006	Hardturm, Zürich, Switzerland	China	3–0	4–1	Friendly
26	19 June 2006	FIFA WM Stadion Dortmund, Dortmund, Germany	Togo	1–0	2–0	2006 World Cup
27	23 June 2006	FIFA WM Stadion Hannover, Hanover, Germany	South Korea	2–0	2–0	2006 World Cup
28	16 August 2006	Rheinpark Stadion, Vaduz, Liechtenstein	Liechtenstein	1–0	3–0	Friendly
29	16 August 2006	Rheinpark Stadion, Vaduz, Liechtenstein	Liechtenstein	2–0	3–0	Friendly
30	2 September 2006	St. Jakob-Park, Basel, Switzerland	Venezuela	1–0	1–0	Friendly
31	6 September 2006	Stade de Genève, Geneva, Switzerland	Costa Rica	2–0	2–0	Friendly
32	25 March 2007	Miami Orange Bowl, Miami, United States	Colombia	1–1	1–3	Friendly
33	24 May 2008	Cornaredo Stadium, Lugano, Switzerland	Slovakia	2–0	2–0	Friendly
34	30 May 2008	AFG Arena, St. Gallen, Switzerland	Liechtenstein	1–0	3–0	Friendly
35	30 May 2008	AFG Arena, St. Gallen, Switzerland	Liechtenstein	2–0	3–0	Friendly
36	11 October 2008	AFG Arena, St. Gallen, Switzerland	Latvia	1–0	2–1	2010 World Cup qualifier
37	15 October 2008	Karaiskakis Stadium, Piraeus, Greece	Greece	1–0	2–1	2010 World Cup qualifier
38	28 March 2009	Zimbru Stadium, Chişinău, Moldova	Moldova	1–0	2–0	2010 World Cup qualifier
39	1 April 2009	Stade de Genève, Geneva, Switzerland	Moldova	2–0	2–0	2010 World Cup qualifier
40	9 September 2009	Skonto Stadium, Riga, Latvia	Latvia	1–0	2–2	2010 World Cup qualifier
41	17 November 2010	Stade de Genève, Geneva, Switzerland	Ukraine	1–0	2–2	Friendly
42	17 November 2010	Stade de Genève, Geneva, Switzerland	Ukraine	2–1	2–2	Friendly

=== Managerial ===
As of 16 March 2024

Managerial record by team and tenure
Team	Nat.	From	To	Record				
Team	Nat.	From	To	G	W	D	L	Win %
FC Wil	(Switzerland)	7 September 2020	9 November 2021	52	16	11	25	30.77
Winterthur	(Switzerland)	20 December 2021	30 June 2022	18	10	6	2	55.56
Basel	(Switzerland)	1 July 2022	7 February 2023	34	14	10	10	41.18
Aarau	(Switzerland)	12 June 2023	16 March 2024	28	11	7	10	39.29
Total				132	51	34	47	38.64

== Honours ==
Servette

- Swiss Cup: 2000–01

Basel

- Swiss Super League: 2009–10, 2010–11, 2011–12, 2012–13
- Swiss Cup: 2009–10, 2011–12

Individual

- Credit Suisse Player of the Year: 2003
- Ligue 1 Golden Boot: 2004–05 (20 goals)
- Credit Suisse Player of the Year: 2004, 2005, 2007
- Swiss Super League Golden Boot: 2010–11 (27 goals), 2011–12 (24 goals)
- Axpo Super League Player of the Year: 2011, 2012
- Swiss Golden Player Award: "Best Forward": 2011, 2012
- Swiss Super League Team of the Year: 2014–15

== See also ==
- List of top international men's football goal scorers by country
