= 2006 FIFA World Cup qualification – UEFA Group 5 =

Football tournament qualification stage

The 2006 FIFA World Cup qualification UEFA Group 5 was a UEFA qualifying group for the 2006 FIFA World Cup. The group comprised Belarus, Italy, Moldova, Norway, Scotland and Slovenia.

The group was won by Italy, who qualified for the 2006 FIFA World Cup. The runners-up Norway entered the UEFA qualification play-offs.

== Standings ==
Pos	Team	Pld	W	D	L	GF	GA	GD	Pts	Qualification	Italy national football team	Norway national football team	Scotland national football team	Slovenia national football team	Belarus national football team	Moldova national football team
1	Italy	10	7	2	1	17	8	+9	23	Qualification to 2006 FIFA World Cup	—	2–1	2–0	1–0	4–3	2–1
2	Norway	10	5	3	2	12	7	+5	18	Advance to second round	0–0	—	1–2	3–0	1–1	1–0
3	Scotland	10	3	4	3	9	7	+2	13		1–1	0–1	—	0–0	0–1	2–0
4	Slovenia	10	3	3	4	10	13	−3	12		1–0	2–3	0–3	—	1–1	3–0
5	Belarus	10	2	4	4	12	14	−2	10		1–4	0–1	0–0	1–1	—	4–0
6	Moldova	10	1	2	7	5	16	−11	5		0–1	0–0	1–1	1–2	2–0	—

Rules for classification: Tiebreakers

== Matches ==
4 September 2004
20:15

Slovenia	3–0	Moldova
Ačimovič 5', 27', 48'	(Report)

Arena Petrol, Celje
Attendance: 3,620
Referee: Jouni Hyytiä (Finland)
4 September 2004
20:45

Italy	2–1	Norway
De Rossi 4'; Toni 80'	(Report)	Carew 1'

Stadio Renzo Barbera, Palermo
Attendance: 21,463
Referee: Alain Sars (France)

8 September 2004
20:00

Scotland	0–0	Slovenia
	(Report)

Hampden Park, Glasgow
Attendance: 38,279
Referee: Claus Bo Larsen (Denmark)
8 September 2004
20:00

Norway	1–1	Belarus
Riseth 39'	(Report)	Kutuzov 78'

Ullevaal Stadion, Oslo
Attendance: 25,272
Referee: Paulo Costa (Portugal)
8 September 2004
21:45

Moldova	0–1	Italy
	(Report)	Del Piero 32'

Stadionul Republican, Chişinău
Attendance: 5,200
Referee: Michal Beneš (Czech Republic)

9 October 2004
15:00

Scotland	0–1	Norway
	(Report)	Iversen 54' (pen.)

Hampden Park, Glasgow
Attendance: 51,000
Referee: Paul Allaerts (Belgium)
9 October 2004
19:00

Belarus	4–0	Moldova
Omelyanchuk 45'; Kutuzov 65'; Bulyha 75'; Romaschenko 90+1'	(Report)

Dinamo, Minsk
Attendance: 21,000
Referee: Selçuk Dereli (Turkey)
9 October 2004
21:00

Slovenia	1–0	Italy
Cesar 82'	(Report)

Arena Petrol, Celje
Attendance: 9,262
Referee: Frank De Bleeckere (Belgium)

13 October 2004
19:00

Norway	3–0	Slovenia
Carew 7'; Pedersen 60'; Ødegaard 89'	(Report)

Ullevaal Stadion, Oslo
Attendance: 24,907
Referee: Valentin Ivanov (Russia)
13 October 2004
21:00

Moldova	1–1	Scotland
Dadu 28'	(Report)	Thompson 31'

Stadionul Republican, Chişinău
Attendance: 7,000
Referee: Kristinn Jakobsson (Iceland)
13 October 2004
21:00

Italy	4–3	Belarus
Totti 26' (pen.), 74'; De Rossi 32'; Gilardino 86'	(Report)	Romaschenko 52', 88'; Bulyga 76'

Stadio Ennio Tardini, Parma
Attendance: 19,833
Referee: Carlos Megía Dávila (Spain)

26 March 2005
20:45

Italy	2–0	Scotland
Pirlo 35', 84'	(Report)

Stadio Giuseppe Meazza, Milan
Attendance: 40,745
Referee: Kyros Vassaras (Greece)

30 March 2005
20:15

Slovenia	1–1	Belarus
Rodić 44'	(Report)	Kulchiy 49'

Arena Petrol, Celje
Attendance: 6,450
Referee: Khalil Al Ghamdi (Saudi Arabia)
30 March 2005
20:45

Moldova	0–0	Norway
	(Report)

Stadionul Republican, Chişinău
Attendance: 5,000
Referee: Florian Meyer (Germany)

4 June 2005
15:00

Scotland	2–0	Moldova
Dailly 52'; McFadden 88'	(Report)

Hampden Park, Glasgow
Attendance: 45,317
Referee: Eric Braamhaar (Norway)
4 June 2005
20:00

Belarus	1–1	Slovenia
Belkevich 18'	(Report)	Čeh 17'

Dinamo, Minsk
Attendance: 29,042
Referee: Martin Hansson (Sweden)
4 June 2005
20:30

Norway	0–0	Italy
	(Report)

Ullevaal Stadion, Oslo
Attendance: 24,829
Referee: Manuel Mejuto González (Spain)

8 June 2005
21:00

Belarus	0–0	Scotland
	(Report)

Dinamo, Minsk
Attendance: 28,287
Referee: Olegário Benquerença (Portugal)

3 September 2005
17:30

Scotland	1–1	Italy
Miller 13'	(Report)	Grosso 75'

Hampden Park, Glasgow
Attendance: 50,185
Referee: Ľuboš Micheľ (Slovakia)
3 September 2005
19:00

Moldova	2–0	Belarus
Rogaciov 17', 49'	(Report)

Stadionul Republican, Chişinău
Attendance: 5,000
Referee: Laurent Duhamel (France)
3 September 2005
20:45

Slovenia	2–3	Norway
Cimirotič 4'; Žlogar 83'	(Report)	Carew 3'; Lundekvam 23'; Pedersen 90+2'

Arena Petrol, Celje
Attendance: 10,055
Referee: Luis Medina Cantalejo (Spain)

7 September 2005
19:00

Norway	1–2	Scotland
Årst 89'	(Report)	Miller 20', 30'

Ullevaal Stadion, Oslo
Attendance: 24,904
Referee: Alain Hamer (Luxembourg)
7 September 2005
20:00

Belarus	1–4	Italy
Kutuzov 4'	(Report)	Toni 6', 13', 55'; Camoranesi 45'

Dinamo, Minsk
Attendance: 30,299
Referee: René Temmink (Netherlands)
7 September 2005
21:15

Moldova	1–2	Slovenia
Rogaciov 31'	(Report)	Lavrič 47'; Mavrič 58'

Stadionul Republican, Chişinău
Attendance: 7,200
Referee: Yuri Baskakov (Russia)

8 October 2005
15:00

Scotland	0–1	Belarus
	(Report)	Kutuzov 5'

Hampden Park, Glasgow
Attendance: 51,105
Referee: Zsolt Szabó (Hungary)
8 October 2005
20:15

Norway	1–0	Moldova
Rushfeldt 50'	(Report)

Ullevaal Stadion, Oslo
Attendance: 23,409
Referee: Steve Bennett (England)
8 October 2005
21:00

Italy	1–0	Slovenia
Zaccardo 78'	(Report)

Stadio Renzo Barbera, Palermo
Attendance: 19,123
Referee: Éric Poulat (France)

12 October 2005
20:30

Italy	2–1	Moldova
Vieri 70'; Gilardino 85'	(Report)	Gațcan 76'

Stadio Via del Mare, Lecce
Attendance: 28,160
Referee: Olegário Benquerença (Portugal)
12 October 2005
20:30

Slovenia	0–3	Scotland
	(Report)	Fletcher 4'; McFadden 47'; Hartley 84'

Arena Petrol, Celje
Attendance: 9,100
Referee: René Temmink (Netherlands)
12 October 2005
21:30

Belarus	0–1	Norway
	(Report)	Helstad 74'

Dinamo Stadium, Minsk
Attendance: 13,222
Referee: Konrad Plautz (Austria)

== Goalscorers ==
There were 65 goals scored in 30 matches, for an average of 2.17 goals per match.

4 goals

- (Belarus) Vitali Kutuzov
- (Italy) Luca Toni

3 goals

- (Belarus) Maksim Romaschenko
- (Moldova) Serghei Rogaciov
- (Norway) John Carew
- (Scotland) Kenny Miller
- (Slovenia) Milenko Ačimovič

2 goals

- (Belarus) Vital Bulyga
- (Italy) Daniele De Rossi
- (Italy) Alberto Gilardino
- (Italy) Andrea Pirlo
- (Italy) Francesco Totti
- (Norway) Morten Gamst Pedersen
- (Scotland) James McFadden

1 goal

- (Belarus) Valentin Belkevich
- (Belarus) Alyaksandr Kulchiy
- (Belarus) Sergei Omelyanchuk
- (Italy) Mauro Camoranesi
- (Italy) Alessandro Del Piero
- (Italy) Fabio Grosso
- (Italy) Christian Vieri
- (Italy) Cristian Zaccardo
- (Moldova) Serghei Dadu
- (Moldova) Alexandru Gațcan
- (Norway) Thorstein Helstad
- (Norway) Steffen Iversen
- (Norway) Claus Lundekvam
- (Norway) Vidar Riseth
- (Norway) Sigurd Rushfeldt
- (Norway) Alexander Ødegaard
- (Norway) Ole Martin Årst
- (Scotland) Christian Dailly
- (Scotland) Darren Fletcher
- (Scotland) Paul Hartley
- (Scotland) Steven Thompson
- (Slovenia) Nastja Čeh
- (Slovenia) Boštjan Cesar
- (Slovenia) Sebastjan Cimirotič
- (Slovenia) Klemen Lavrič
- (Slovenia) Matej Mavrič
- (Slovenia) Aleksander Rodić
- (Slovenia) Anton Žlogar
