= 2006 FIFA World Cup qualification – UEFA Group 7 =

Football tournament qualification stage

The 2006 FIFA World Cup qualification UEFA Group 7 was a UEFA qualifying group for the 2006 FIFA World Cup. The group comprised Belgium, Bosnia and Herzegovina, Lithuania, San Marino, Serbia and Montenegro and Spain.

The group was won by Serbia and Montenegro, who qualified for the 2006 FIFA World Cup. The runners-up Spain entered the UEFA qualification play-offs.

== Standings ==
Pos	Team	Pld	W	D	L	GF	GA	GD	Pts	Qualification	Serbia and Montenegro national football team	Spain national football team	Bosnia and Herzegovina national football team	Belgium national football team	Lithuania national football team	San Marino national football team
1	Serbia and Montenegro	10	6	4	0	16	1	+15	22	Qualification to 2006 FIFA World Cup	—	0–0	1–0	0–0	2–0	5–0
2	Spain	10	5	5	0	19	3	+16	20	Advance to second round	1–1	—	1–1	2–0	1–0	5–0
3	Bosnia and Herzegovina	10	4	4	2	12	9	+3	16		0–0	1–1	—	1–0	1–1	3–0
4	Belgium	10	3	3	4	16	11	+5	12		0–2	0–2	4–1	—	1–1	8–0
5	Lithuania	10	2	4	4	8	9	−1	10		0–2	0–0	0–1	1–1	—	4–0
6	San Marino	10	0	0	10	2	40	−38	0		0–3	0–6	1–3	1–2	0–1	—

Rules for classification: Tiebreakers

== Matches ==
4 September 2004
20:15

Belgium	1–1	Lithuania
Sonck 61'	(Report)	Jankauskas 73'

Stade du Pays de Charleroi, Charleroi
Attendance: 19,218
Referee: Loizos Loizou (Cyprus)
4 September 2004
20:30

San Marino	0–3	Serbia and Montenegro
	(Report)	Vukić 4'; Jestrović 15', 83'

Stadio Olimpico, Serravalle
Attendance: 1,137
Referee: Akmalkhan Kholmatov (Kazakhstan)

8 September 2004
19:15

Lithuania	4–0	San Marino
Jankauskas 18', 50'; Danilevičius 65'; Gedgaudas 90+2'	(Report)

S. Darius and S. Girėnas Stadium, Kaunas
Attendance: 4,000
Referee: Sokol Jareci (Albania)
8 September 2004
20:15

Bosnia and Herzegovina	1–1	Spain
Bolić 79'	(Report)	Vicente 65'

Bilino Polje, Zenica
Attendance: 14,380
Referee: Massimo De Santis (Italy)

9 October 2004
20:15

Bosnia and Herzegovina	0–0	Serbia and Montenegro
	(Report)

Asim Ferhatović Hase Stadium, Sarajevo
Attendance: 22,440
Referee: Gilles Veissière (France)
9 October 2004
21:45

Spain	2–0	Belgium
Luque 60'; Raúl 65'	(Report)

Estadio El Sardinero, Santander
Attendance: 17,000
Referee: Kim Milton Nielsen (Denmark)

13 October 2004
20:00

Serbia and Montenegro	5–0	San Marino
Milošević 35'; Stanković 46', 50'; Koroman 53'; Vukić 69'	(Report)

Stadion Crvena Zvezda, Belgrade
Attendance: 4,000
Referee: Lassin Isaksen (Faroe Islands)
13 October 2004
21:15

Lithuania	0–0	Spain
	(Report)

Žalgiris Stadium, Vilnius
Attendance: 9,114
Referee: Éric Poulat (France)

17 November 2004
20:15

Belgium	0–2	Serbia and Montenegro
	(Report)	Vukić 8'; Kežman 60'

King Baudouin Stadium, Brussels
Attendance: 28,350
Referee: Peter Fröjdfeldt (Sweden)
17 November 2004
20:30

San Marino	0–1	Lithuania
	(Report)	D. Česnauskis 41'

Stadio Olimpico, Serravalle
Attendance: 1,457
Referee: Karen Nalbandyan (Armenia)

9 February 2005
21:45

Spain	5–0	San Marino
Joaquín 15'; Torres 32'; Raúl 42'; Guti 61'; Del Horno 75'	(Report)

Estadio de los Juegos Mediterráneos, Almería
Attendance: 12,580
Referee: Kenny Clark (Scotland)

26 March 2005
20:15

Belgium	4–1	Bosnia and Herzegovina
É. Mpenza 15', 54'; Daerden 44'; Buffel 77'	(Report)	Bajramović 1'

King Baudouin Stadium, Brussels
Attendance: 36,700
Referee: Vladimír Hriňák (Slovakia)

30 March 2005
20:00

Bosnia and Herzegovina	1–1	Lithuania
Bolić 21'	(Report)	Stankevičius 60'

Asim Ferhatović Hase Stadium, Sarajevo
Attendance: 6,000
Referee: Yuri Baskakov (Russia)
30 March 2005
20:30

San Marino	1–2	Belgium
A. Selva 41'	(Report)	Simons 18' (pen.); Van Buyten 65'

Stadio Olimpico, Serravalle
Attendance: 871
Referee: Giorgos Kasnaferis (Greece)
30 March 2005
21:00

Serbia and Montenegro	0–0	Spain
	(Report)

Stadion Crvena Zvezda, Belgrade
Attendance: 48,910
Referee: Massimo Busacca (Switzerland)

4 June 2005
20:15

Serbia and Montenegro	0–0	Belgium
	(Report)

Stadion Crvena Zvezda, Belgrade
Attendance: 16,662
Referee: Valentin Ivanov (Russia)
4 June 2005
20:30

San Marino	1–3	Bosnia and Herzegovina
A. Selva 39'	(Report)	Salihamidžić 17', 38'; Barbarez 75'

Stadio Olimpico, Serravalle
Attendance: 750
Referee: Bülent Demirlek (Turkey)
4 June 2005
21:30

Spain	1–0	Lithuania
Luque 68'	(Report)

Estadio Mestalla, Valencia
Attendance: 25,000
Referee: Stefano Farina (Italy)

8 June 2005
22:00

Spain	1–1	Bosnia and Herzegovina
Marchena 90+6'	(Report)	Misimović 39'

Estadio Mestalla, Valencia
Attendance: 38,041
Referee: Steve Bennett (England)

3 September 2005
20:15

Bosnia and Herzegovina	1–0	Belgium
Barbarez 62'	(Report)

Bilino Polje, Zenica
Attendance: 12,000
Referee: Olegário Benquerença (Portugal)
3 September 2005
20:30

Serbia and Montenegro	2–0	Lithuania
Kežman 18'; Ilić 74'	(Report)

Stadion Crvena Zvezda, Belgrade
Attendance: 20,203
Referee: Kim Milton Nielsen (Denmark)

7 September 2005
20:00

Lithuania	0–1	Bosnia and Herzegovina
	(Report)	Barbarez 28'

Vėtra Stadium, Vilnius
Attendance: 4,000
Referee: Viktor Kassai (Hungary)
7 September 2005
20:30

Belgium	8–0	San Marino
Simons 34' (pen.); Daerden 39', 67'; Buffel 44'; M. Mpenza 52', 71'; Vandenbergh 53'; Van Buyten 83'	(Report)

Olympisch Stadion, Antwerp
Attendance: 8,207
Referee: Ian Stokes (Republic of Ireland)
7 September 2005
22:00

Spain	1–1	Serbia and Montenegro
Raúl 19'	(Report)	Kežman 69'

Vicente Calderón Stadium, Madrid
Attendance: 51,491
Referee: Graham Poll (England)

8 October 2005
20:00

Lithuania	0–2	Serbia and Montenegro
	(Report)	Kežman 43'; Vukić 85'

Vėtra Stadium, Vilnius
Attendance: 1,500
Referee: Jan Wegereef (Netherlands)
8 October 2005
20:00

Bosnia and Herzegovina	3–0	San Marino
Bolić 46', 75', 82'	(Report)

Bilino Polje, Zenica
Attendance: 8,500
Referee: Alain Hamer (Luxembourg)
8 October 2005
20:45

Belgium	0–2	Spain
	(Report)	Torres 56', 59'

King Baudouin Stadium, Brussels
Attendance: 40,300
Referee: Ľuboš Micheľ (Slovakia)

12 October 2005
20:30

San Marino	0–6	Spain
	(Report)	López 1'; Torres 11', 78', 89' (pen.); Ramos 31', 48'

Stadio Olimpico, Serravalle
Attendance: 3,426
Referee: Florian Meyer (Germany)
12 October 2005
20:30

Serbia and Montenegro	1–0	Bosnia and Herzegovina
Kežman 7'	(Report)

Stadion Crvena Zvezda, Belgrade
Attendance: 46,305
Referee: Kyros Vassaras (Greece)
12 October 2005
21:30

Lithuania	1–1	Belgium
Deschacht 82' (o.g.)	(Report)	Geraerts 20'

Vėtra Stadium, Vilnius
Attendance: 1,500
Referee: Mike Riley (England)

== Goalscorers ==
There were 73 goals scored in 30 matches, for an average of 2.43 goals per match.

6 goals

- (Spain) Fernando Torres

5 goals

- (Bosnia and Herzegovina) Elvir Bolić
- (Serbia and Montenegro) Mateja Kežman

4 goals

- (Serbia and Montenegro) Zvonimir Vukić

3 goals

- (Belgium) Koen Daerden
- (Bosnia and Herzegovina) Sergej Barbarez
- (Lithuania) Edgaras Jankauskas
- (Spain) Raúl

2 goals

- (Belgium) Thomas Buffel
- (Belgium) Émile Mpenza
- (Belgium) Mbo Mpenza
- (Belgium) Timmy Simons
- (Belgium) Daniel Van Buyten
- (Bosnia and Herzegovina) Hasan Salihamidžić
- (San Marino) Andy Selva
- (Serbia and Montenegro) Nenad Jestrović
- (Serbia and Montenegro) Dejan Stanković
- (Spain) Albert Luque
- (Spain) Sergio Ramos

1 goal

- (Belgium) Karel Geraerts
- (Belgium) Wesley Sonck
- (Belgium) Kevin Vandenbergh
- (Bosnia and Herzegovina) Zlatan Bajramović
- (Bosnia and Herzegovina) Zvjezdan Misimović
- (Lithuania) Deividas Česnauskis
- (Lithuania) Tomas Danilevičius
- (Lithuania) Andrius Gedgaudas
- (Lithuania) Marius Stankevičius
- (Serbia and Montenegro) Saša Ilić
- (Serbia and Montenegro) Ognjen Koroman
- (Serbia and Montenegro) Savo Milošević
- (Spain) Guti
- (Spain) Asier del Horno
- (Spain) Joaquín
- (Spain) Antonio López
- (Spain) Carlos Marchena
- (Spain) Vicente Rodríguez

1 own goal

- (Belgium) Olivier Deschacht (against Lithuania)
