= 2006 FIFA World Cup qualification – UEFA Group 1 =

Football tournament qualification stage

The 2006 FIFA World Cup qualification UEFA Group 1 was a UEFA qualifying group for the 2006 FIFA World Cup. The group comprised Andorra, Armenia, Czech Republic, Finland, Macedonia and Netherlands and Romania.

The group was won by Netherlands, who qualified for the 2006 FIFA World Cup. The runners-up Czech Republic entered the UEFA qualification play-offs.

== Standings ==
Pos	Team	Pld	W	D	L	GF	GA	GD	Pts	Qualification	Netherlands national football team	Czech Republic national football team	Romania national football team	Finland national football team	North Macedonia national football team	Armenia national football team	Andorra national football team
1	Netherlands	12	10	2	0	27	3	+24	32	Qualification to 2006 FIFA World Cup	—	2–0	2–0	3–1	0–0	2–0	4–0
2	Czech Republic	12	9	0	3	35	12	+23	27	Advance to second round	0–2	—	1–0	4–3	6–1	4–1	8–1
3	Romania	12	8	1	3	20	10	+10	25		0–2	2–0	—	2–1	2–1	3–0	2–0
4	Finland	12	5	1	6	21	19	+2	16		0–4	0–3	0–1	—	5–1	3–1	3–0
5	Macedonia	12	2	3	7	11	24	−13	9		2–2	0–2	1–2	0–3	—	3–0	0–0
6	Armenia	12	2	1	9	9	25	−16	7		0–1	0–3	1–1	0–2	1–2	—	2–1
7	Andorra	12	1	2	9	4	34	−30	5		0–3	0–4	1–5	0–0	1–0	0–3	—

Rules for classification: Tiebreakers

== Matches ==
18 August 2004
20:00

Macedonia	3–0	Armenia
Pandev 5'; Šakiri 37'; Šumulikoski 90'	(Report)

Skopje City Stadium, Skopje
Attendance: 4,375
Referee: Anton Guenov (Bulgaria)
18 August 2004
20:30

Romania	2–1	Finland
Mutu 50'; Petre 90'	(Report)	Eremenko 90+3'

Stadionul Giuleşti, Bucharest
Attendance: 17,500
Referee: Grzegorz Gilewski (Poland)

4 September 2004
17:00

Finland	3–0	Andorra
Eremenko 42', 64'; Riihilahti 58'	(Report)

Ratina Stadion, Tampere
Attendance: 7,437
Referee: Željko Širić (Croatia)
4 September 2004
20:30

Romania	2–1	Macedonia
Pancu 15'; Mutu 88'	(Report)	Vasoski 70'

Stadionul Ion Oblemenco, Craiova
Attendance: 14,500
Referee: Konrad Plautz (Austria)

8 September 2004
16:00

Andorra	1–5	Romania
Pujol 28' (pen.)	(Report)	Cernat 1', 17'; Pancu 5', 83'; Niculae 70'

Estadi Comunal d'Aixovall, Andorra La Vella
Attendance: 1,100
Referee: Knut Kircher (Germany)
8 September 2004
20:30

Netherlands	2–0	Czech Republic
Van Hooijdonk 34', 84'	(Report)

Amsterdam ArenA, Amsterdam
Attendance: 48,488
Referee: Markus Merk (Germany)
8 September 2004
21:00

Armenia	0–2	Finland
	(Report)	Forssell 24'; Eremenko 67'

Hanrapetakan Stadium, Yerevan
Attendance: 2,864
Referee: Paulius Malzinskas (Lithuania)

9 October 2004
17:00

Czech Republic	1–0	Romania
Koller 36'	(Report)

Toyota Arena, Prague
Attendance: 16,028
Referee: Roberto Rosetti (Italy)
9 October 2004
17:00

Finland	3–1	Armenia
Kuqi 9', 87'; Eremenko 28'	(Report)	Shahgeldyan 32'

Ratina Stadion, Tampere
Attendance: 7,894
Referee: Herbert Fandel (Germany)
9 October 2004
20:30

Macedonia	2–2	Netherlands
Pandev 45'; Stojkov 71'	(Report)	Bouma 42'; Kuyt 65'

Skopje City Stadium, Skopje
Attendance: 15,000
Referee: Peter Frojdfeldt (Sweden)

13 October 2004
15:00

Andorra	1–0	Macedonia
Bernaus 60'	(Report)

Estadi Comunal d'Aixovall, Andorra La Vella
Attendance: 350
Referee: Stefano Podesci (San Marino)
13 October 2004
20:20

Armenia	0–3	Czech Republic
	(Report)	Koller 3', 75'; Rosický 30'

Hanrapetakan Stadium, Yerevan
Attendance: 3,205
Referee: Jacek Granat (Poland)
13 October 2004
20:30

Netherlands	3–1	Finland
Sneijder 39'; Van Nistelrooy 41', 63'	(Report)	Tainio 13'

Amsterdam ArenA, Amsterdam
Attendance: 50,000
Referee: Stephen Bennett (England)

17 November 2004
17:30

Macedonia	0–2	Czech Republic
	(Report)	Lokvenc 88'; Koller 90'

Skopje City Stadium, Skopje
Attendance: 7,000
Referee: Urs Meier (Switzerland)
17 November 2004
19:00

Armenia	1–1	Romania
Dokhoyan 60'	(Report)	Marica 29'

Hanrapetakan Stadium, Yerevan
Attendance: 1,403
Referee: Frank De Bleeckere (Belgium)
17 November 2004
20:30

Andorra	0–3	Netherlands
	(Report)	Cocu 21'; Robben 31'; Sneijder 78'

Mini Estadi, Barcelona (Spain)
Attendance: 2,000
Referee: Alon Yefet (Israel)

9 February 2005
16:00

Macedonia	0–0	Andorra
	(Report)

Skopje City Stadium, Skopje
Attendance: 5,000
Referee: Johan Verbist (Belgium)

26 March 2005
17:00

Czech Republic	4–3	Finland
Baroš 7'; Rosický 34'; Polák 58'; Lokvenc 87'	(Report)	Litmanen 46'; Riihilahti 73'; Johansson 79'

Na Stinadlech, Teplice
Attendance: 16,200
Referee: Claus Bo Larsen (Denmark)
26 March 2005
18:00

Armenia	2–1	Andorra
Ara Hakobyan 30'; Khachatryan 73'	(Report)	Silva 56'

Hanrapetakan Stadium, Yerevan
Attendance: 2,100
Referee: Joseph Attard (Malta)
26 March 2005
20:00

Romania	0–2	Netherlands
	(Report)	Cocu 1'; Babel 84'

Stadionul Giuleşti, Bucharest
Attendance: 16,100
Referee: Luis Medina Cantalejo (Spain)

30 March 2005
16:50

Andorra	0–4	Czech Republic
	(Report)	Jankulovski 31' (pen.); Baroš 40'; Lokvenc 53'; Rosický 90+2' (pen.)

Estadi Comunal d'Aixovall, Andorra La Vella
Attendance: 900
Referee: Stefan Messner (Austria)
30 March 2005
20:00

Macedonia	1–2	Romania
Maznov 31'	(Report)	Mitea 18', 58'

Skopje City Stadium, Skopje
Attendance: 15,000
Referee: Tom Ovrebo (Norway)
30 March 2005
20:30

Netherlands	2–0	Armenia
Castelen 3'; Van Nistelrooy 33'	(Report)

Philips Stadion, Eindhoven
Attendance: 35,000
Referee: Matteo Trefoloni (Italy)

4 June 2005
17:00

Czech Republic	8–1	Andorra
Lokvenc 12', 90+2'; Koller 30'; Šmicer 37'; Galásek 52'; Baroš 79'; Rosický 84'; Polák 86'	(Report)	Riera 36'

U Nisy Stadium, Liberec
Attendance: 9,520
Referee: Selçuk Dereli (Turkey)
4 June 2005
20:00

Armenia	1–2	Macedonia
Manucharyan 55'	(Report)	Pandev 29' (pen.), 47'

Hanrapetakan Stadium, Yerevan
Attendance: 2,870
Referee: Tomasz Mikulski (Poland)
4 June 2005
20:30

Netherlands	2–0	Romania
Robben 26'; Kuyt 47'	(Report)

Feijenoord Stadion, Rotterdam
Attendance: 47,000
Referee: Massimo De Santis (Italy)

8 June 2005
17:00

Czech Republic	6–1	Macedonia
Koller 41', 45', 48', 52'; Rosický 73'; Baroš 87'	(Report)	Pandev 13'

Na Stinadlech, Teplice
Attendance: 14,150
Referee: Arturo Dauden Ibanez (Spain)
8 June 2005
20:30

Romania	3–0	Armenia
Petre 29'; Bucur 40', 78'	(Report)

Stadionul Farul, Constanța
Attendance: 5,146
Referee: Athanassios Briakos (Greece)
8 June 2005
21:00

Finland	0–4	Netherlands
	(Report)	Van Nistelrooy 36'; Kuyt 76'; Cocu 85'; Van Persie 87'

Helsinki Olympic Stadium, Helsinki
Attendance: 37,786
Referee: Alain Hamer (Luxembourg)

17 August 2005
20:00

Macedonia	0–3	Finland
	(Report)	Eremenko 8', 45'; Roiha 87'

Skopje City Stadium, Skopje
Attendance: 6,800
Referee: Matthew Messias (England)
17 August 2005
21:30

Romania	2–0	Andorra
Mutu 29', 41'	(Report)

Stadionul Farul, Constanța
Attendance: 8,200
Referee: Haim Jakov (Israel)

3 September 2005
16:00

Andorra	0–0	Finland
	(Report)

Estadi Comunal d'Aixovall, Andorra La Vella
Attendance: 860
Referee: Johny Ver Eecke (Belgium)
3 September 2005
21:00

Romania	2–0	Czech Republic
Mutu 28', 56'	(Report)

Stadionul Farul, Constanța
Attendance: 7,000
Referee: Terje Hauge (Norway)
3 September 2005
22:00

Armenia	0–1	Netherlands
	(Report)	Van Nistelrooy 64'

Hanrapetakan Stadium, Yerevan
Attendance: 1,747
Referee: Stuart Dougal (Scotland)

7 September 2005
17:30

Czech Republic	4–1	Armenia
Heinz 47'; Polák 52', 76'; Baroš 58'	(Report)	Ara Hakobyan 85'

Andrův stadion, Olomouc
Attendance: 12,015
Referee: Martin Hansson (Sweden)
7 September 2005
19:00

Finland	5–1	Macedonia
Forssell 10', 12', 61'; Tihinen 41'; Eremenko 54'	(Report)	Maznov 48'

Ratina Stadion, Tampere
Attendance: 6,467
Referee: Kristinn Jakobsson (Iceland)
7 September 2005
20:30

Netherlands	4–0	Andorra
Van der Vaart 23'; Cocu 27'; Van Nistelrooy 43', 89'	(Report)

Philips Stadion, Eindhoven
Attendance: 34,000
Referee: Attila Hanacsek (Hungary)

8 October 2005
17:00

Finland	0–1	Romania
	(Report)	Mutu 41' (pen.)

Helsinki Olympic Stadium, Helsinki
Attendance: 11,500
Referee: Anton Guenov (Bulgaria)
8 October 2005
20:30

Czech Republic	0–2	Netherlands
	(Report)	Van der Vaart 31'; Opdam 38'

Toyota Arena, Prague
Attendance: 17,478
Referee: Alain Sars (France)

12 October 2005
16:00

Andorra	0–3	Armenia
	(Report)	Sonejee 40' (o.g.); Aram Hakobyan 52'; Ara Hakobyan 62'

Estadi Comunal d'Aixovall, Andorra La Vella
Attendance: 430
Referee: Ian Stokes (Ireland)
12 October 2005
18:30

Finland	0–3	Czech Republic
	(Report)	Jun 6'; Rosický 51'; Heinz 58'

Helsinki Olympic Stadium, Helsinki
Attendance: 11,234
Referee: Manuel Mejuto Gonzales (Spain)
12 October 2005
19:30

Netherlands	0–0	Macedonia
	(Report)

Amsterdam ArenA, Amsterdam
Attendance: 50,000
Referee: Stefano Farina (Italy)

== Goalscorers ==
There were 127 goals scored in 42 matches, for an average of 3.02 goals per match.

9 goals

- (Czech Republic) Jan Koller

8 goals

- (Finland) Alexei Eremenko

7 goals

- (Netherlands) Ruud Van Nistelrooy
- (Romania) Adrian Mutu

6 goals

- (Czech Republic) Tomáš Rosický

5 goals

- (Czech Republic) Milan Baroš
- (Czech Republic) Vratislav Lokvenc
- (North Macedonia) Goran Pandev

4 goals

- (Czech Republic) Jan Polák
- (Finland) Mikael Forssell
- (Netherlands) Phillip Cocu

3 goals

- (Armenia) Ara Hakobyan
- (Netherlands) Dirk Kuyt
- (Romania) Daniel Pancu

2 goals

- (Czech Republic) Marek Heinz
- (Finland) Shefki Kuqi
- (Finland) Aki Riihilahti
- (North Macedonia) Goran Maznov
- (Netherlands) Arjen Robben
- (Netherlands) Wesley Sneijder
- (Netherlands) Rafael Van der Vaart
- (Netherlands) Pierre Van Hooijdonk
- (Romania) Gheorghe Bucur
- (Romania) Florin Cernat
- (Romania) Nicolae Mitea

1 goal

- (Andorra) Marc Bernaus
- (Andorra) Marc Pujol
- (Andorra) Gabriel Riera
- (Andorra) Fernando Silva
- (Armenia) Karen Dokhoyan
- (Armenia) Aram Hakobyan
- (Armenia) Romik Khachatryan
- (Armenia) Edgar Manucharyan
- (Armenia) Armen Shahgeldyan
- (Czech Republic) Tomáš Galásek
- (Czech Republic) Marek Jankulovski
- (Czech Republic) Tomáš Jun
- (Czech Republic) Vladimír Šmicer
- (Finland) Jonatan Johansson
- (Finland) Jari Litmanen
- (Finland) Paulus Roiha
- (Finland) Teemu Tainio
- (Finland) Hannu Tihinen
- (North Macedonia) Artim Šakiri
- (North Macedonia) Aco Stojkov
- (North Macedonia) Veliče Šumulikoski
- (North Macedonia) Aleksandar Vasoski
- (Netherlands) Ryan Babel
- (Netherlands) Wilfred Bouma
- (Netherlands) Romeo Castelen
- (Netherlands) Barry Opdam
- (Netherlands) Robin Van Persie
- (Romania) Ciprian Marica
- (Romania) Marius Niculae
- (Romania) Florentin Petre
- (Romania) Ovidiu Petre

1 own goal

- (Andorra) Óscar Sonejee (against Armenia)
