= 2006 FIFA World Cup qualification – AFC third round =

International football competition

The AFC third round of 2006 FIFA World Cup qualification began on 9 February 2005 and finished on 17 August 2005.

The top two countries in each group at the end of the stage qualified for the 2006 FIFA World Cup, while the third-placed teams entered a play-off to determine an entrant for the play-off with the fourth-placed CONCACAF team.

== Format ==
The 8 group-winners from the previous round were split into two groups of four teams each – with all teams playing home and away against each of the other three teams in the group.

The top two teams in each group qualified for the 2006 FIFA World Cup.

== Group 1 ==
Pos	Team	Pld	W	D	L	GF	GA	GD	Pts	Qualification	Saudi Arabia national football team	South Korea national football team	Uzbekistan national football team	Kuwait national football team
1	Saudi Arabia	6	4	2	0	10	1	+9	14	2006 FIFA World Cup	—	2–0	3–0	3–0
2	South Korea	6	3	1	2	9	5	+4	10	2006 FIFA World Cup	0–1	—	2–1	2–0
3	Uzbekistan	6	1	2	3	7	11	−4	5	Fourth round	1–1	1–1	—	3–2
4	Kuwait	6	1	1	4	4	13	−9	4		0–0	0–4	2–1	—

Rules for classification: Tiebreakers
9 February 2005

South Korea	2–0	Kuwait
Lee Dong-gook 23'; Lee Young-pyo 81'	Report

Seoul World Cup Stadium, Seoul
Attendance: 53,287
Referee: Shamsul Maidin (Singapore)
9 February 2005

Uzbekistan	1–1	Saudi Arabia
Soliev 90+3'	Report	Al-Jaber 77'

Pakhtakor Stadium, Tashkent
Attendance: 45,000
Referee: Toru Kamikawa (Japan)

25 March 2005

Saudi Arabia	2–0	South Korea
Khariri 29'; Al-Qahtani 73' (pen.)	Report

Prince Mohamed bin Fahd Stadium, Dammam
Attendance: 25,000
Referee: Subkhiddin Mohd Salleh (Malaysia)
25 March 2005

Kuwait	2–1	Uzbekistan
Abdullah 7', 62'	Report	Geynrikh 77'

Kazma SC Stadium, Kuwait City
Attendance: 12,000
Referee: Sun Baojie (China PR)

30 March 2005

Kuwait	0–0	Saudi Arabia
	Report

Kazma SC Stadium, Kuwait City
Attendance: 25,000
Referee: Masoud Moradi (Iran)
30 March 2005

South Korea	2–1	Uzbekistan
Lee Young-pyo 55'; Lee Dong-gook 62'	Report	Geynrikh 79'

Seoul World Cup Stadium, Seoul
Attendance: 62,857
Referee: Tallat Najm (Lebanon)

3 June 2005

Saudi Arabia	3–0	Kuwait
Al-Shalhoub 19', 49'; Al-Harthi 83'	Report

King Fahd Stadium, Riyadh
Attendance: 72,000
Referee: Toru Kamikawa (Japan)
3 June 2005

Uzbekistan	1–1	South Korea
Shatskikh 62'	Report	Park Chu-young 90+1'

Pakhtakor Stadium, Tashkent
Attendance: 40,000
Referee: Masoud Moradi (Iran)

8 June 2005

Kuwait	0–4	South Korea
	Report	Park Chu-young 19'; Lee Dong-gook 29' (pen.); Chung Kyung-ho 55'; Park Ji-sung 61'

Kazma SC Stadium, Kuwait City
Attendance: 15,000
Referee: Adunyachart Khanthama (Thailand)
8 June 2005

Saudi Arabia	3–0	Uzbekistan
Al-Jaber 8', 60'; Al-Harthi 87'	Report

King Fahd Stadium, Riyadh
Attendance: 72,000
Referee: Huang Junjie (China PR)

17 August 2005

South Korea	0–1	Saudi Arabia
	Report	Al-Anbar 5'

Seoul World Cup Stadium, Seoul
Attendance: 61,586
Referee: Chaiwat Kunsuta (Thailand)
17 August 2005

Uzbekistan	3–2	Kuwait
Djeparov 41' (pen.); Shatskikh 62'; Soliev 76'	Report	Al-Mutawa 16'; Abdullah 31'

Pakhtakor Stadium, Tashkent
Attendance: 40,000
Referee: Subkhiddin Mohd Salleh (Malaysia)

== Group 2 ==
Pos	Team	Pld	W	D	L	GF	GA	GD	Pts	Qualification	Japan national football team	Iran national football team	Bahrain national football team	North Korea national football team
1	Japan	6	5	0	1	9	4	+5	15	2006 FIFA World Cup	—	2–1	1–0	2–1
2	Iran	6	4	1	1	7	3	+4	13	2006 FIFA World Cup	2–1	—	1–0	1–0
3	Bahrain	6	1	1	4	4	7	−3	4	Fourth round	0–1	0–0	—	2–3
4	North Korea	6	1	0	5	5	11	−6	3		0–2	0–2	1–2	—

Rules for classification: Tiebreakers
9 February 2005

Japan	2–1	North Korea
Ogasawara 4'; Oguro 90+1'	Report	Nam Song-Chol 61'

Saitama Stadium, Saitama
Attendance: 60,000
Referee: Khalil Al Ghamdi (Saudi Arabia)
9 February 2005

Bahrain	0–0	Iran
	Report

Bahrain National Stadium, Riffa
Attendance: 25,000
Referee: Subkhiddin Mohd Salleh (Malaysia)

25 March 2005

North Korea	1–2	Bahrain
Pak Song-Gwan 63'	Report	Ali 7', 58'

Kim Il Sung Stadium, Pyongyang
Attendance: 50,000
Referee: Mongkol Rungklay (Thailand)
25 March 2005

Iran	2–1	Japan
Hashemian 13', 75'	Report	Fukunishi 66'

Azadi Stadium, Tehran
Attendance: 110,000
Referee: Shamsul Maidin (Singapore)

30 March 2005

North Korea	0–2	Iran
	Report	Mahdavikia 34'; Nekounam 79'

Kim Il Sung Stadium, Pyongyang
Attendance: 55,000
Referee: Mohammed Kousa (Syria)
30 March 2005

Japan	1–0	Bahrain
Salmeen 72' (o.g.)	Report

Saitama Stadium, Saitama
Attendance: 67,549
Referee: Ravshan Irmatov (Uzbekistan)

3 June 2005

Iran	1–0	North Korea
Rezaei 45'	Report

Azadi Stadium, Tehran
Attendance: 35,000
Referee: Khalil Al Ghamdi (Saudi Arabia)
3 June 2005

Bahrain	0–1	Japan
	Report	Ogasawara 34'

Bahrain National Stadium, Riffa
Attendance: 32,000
Referee: Subkhiddin Mohd Salleh (Malaysia)

8 June 2005

Iran	1–0	Bahrain
Nosrati 48'	Report

Azadi Stadium, Tehran
Attendance: 80,000
Referee: Kwon Jong-Chul (Korea Republic)

Note: This match was used as backdrop for the 2006 Iranian film Offside.

8 June 2005

North Korea	0–2	Japan
	Report	Yanagisawa 67'; Oguro 89'

Suphachalasai Stadium, Bangkok (Thailand)
Attendance: 0
Referee: Frank De Bleeckere (Belgium)

Note: Since there were crowd troubles in the previous two North Korea's home matches, FIFA decided that the next one North Korea's home match be moved to a neutral venue (Thailand) and played behind closed doors.

17 August 2005

Japan	2–1	Iran
Kaji 28'; Oguro 76'	Report	Daei 79' (pen.)

International Stadium Yokohama, Yokohama
Attendance: 66,098
Referee: Qasem Shaban (Kuwait)
17 August 2005

Bahrain	2–3	North Korea
Isa 49'; Ali 54'	Report	Choe Chol-Man 28'; Kim Chol-Ho 43'; An Chol-Hyok 90'

Bahrain National Stadium, Riffa
Attendance: 3,000
Referee: Shamsul Maidin (Singapore)

== Goalscorers ==
There were 55 goals scored in 24 matches, for an average of 2.29 goals per match.

3 goals

- (Bahrain national football team) Husain Ali
- (Japan national football team) Masashi Oguro
- (Kuwait national football team) Bashar Abdullah
- (Saudi Arabia national football team) Sami Al-Jaber
- (South Korea national football team) Lee Dong-gook

2 goals

- (Iran national football team) Vahid Hashemian
- (Japan national football team) Mitsuo Ogasawara
- (Saudi Arabia national football team) Saad Al-Harthi
- (Saudi Arabia national football team) Mohammad Al-Shalhoub
- (South Korea national football team) Lee Young-pyo
- (South Korea national football team) Park Chu-young
- (Uzbekistan national football team) Alexander Geynrikh
- (Uzbekistan national football team) Maksim Shatskikh
- (Uzbekistan national football team) Anvarjon Soliev

1 goal

- (Bahrain national football team) Salman Isa
- (Iran national football team) Ali Daei
- (Iran national football team) Mehdi Mahdavikia
- (Iran national football team) Javad Nekounam
- (Iran national football team) Mohammad Nosrati
- (Iran national football team) Rahman Rezaei
- (Japan national football team) Takashi Fukunishi
- (Japan national football team) Akira Kaji
- (Japan national football team) Atsushi Yanagisawa
- (Kuwait national football team) Bader Al-Mutawa
- (North Korea national football team) An Chol-hyok
- (North Korea national football team) Choe Chol-man
- (North Korea national football team) Kim Chol-ho
- (North Korea national football team) Nam Song-chol
- (North Korea national football team) Pak Song-gwan
- (Saudi Arabia national football team) Mohammed Al-Anbar
- (Saudi Arabia national football team) Yasser Al-Qahtani
- (Saudi Arabia national football team) Saud Khariri
- (South Korea national football team) Chung Kyung-ho
- (South Korea national football team) Park Ji-sung
- (Uzbekistan national football team) Server Djeparov

1 own goal

- (Bahrain national football team) Mohamed Salmeen (against Japan)
