= 2006 FIFA World Cup qualification – AFC fourth round =

Football competition

The AFC fourth round of 2006 FIFA World Cup qualification was held on 8 and 12 October 2005 between the two teams that finished third in the third round.

The winning team advanced to a play-off against the fourth-placed team of the CONCACAF qualifying group, Trinidad and Tobago. The winner of this playoff qualified for the 2006 World Cup finals.

The first leg was originally played on 3 September 2005 but the match was ordered to be replayed by FIFA after a refereeing mistake. With Uzbekistan leading the tie 1–0, a penalty was awarded to them but the referee disallowed the resulting goal and offered an indirect free kick to Bahrain for encroachment. Uzbekistan had formally requested for the match to be recorded as an automatic 3–0 victory.

== Summary ==
| Team 1 | Agg. | Team 2 | 1st leg | 2nd leg |
|---|---|---|---|---|
| Uzbekistan | 1–1 (a) | Bahrain | 1–1 | 0–0 |

== Matches ==
3 September 2005
18:05

| Uzbekistan | Annulled (Note: The Uzbekistan v Bahrain match originally finished as an 1–0 win for Uzbekistan, but the match saw referee Toshimitsu Yoshida misapply of the Laws of the Game regarding penalty kicks. Following a protest by Uzbekistan, the result was annulled by FIFA and the match was ordered to be replayed, which took place on 8 October 2005.) | Bahrain |
|---|---|---|
| Qosimov 12' | Report |

Pakhtakor Stadium, Tashkent
Referee: Toshimitsu Yoshida (Japan)
8 October 2005
17:05

| Uzbekistan | 1–1 | Bahrain |
|---|---|---|
| Shatskikh 19' | Report | Yousef 17' |

Pakhtakor Stadium, Tashkent
Attendance: 55,000
Referee: Massimo Busacca (Switzerland)
12 October 2005 (Note: The Bahrain v Uzbekistan match was originally scheduled to take place on 7 September 2005, 19:05, but was later rescheduled after the first leg was ordered to be replayed.)
22:00

| Bahrain | 0–0 | Uzbekistan |
|---|---|---|
| | Report |

Bahrain National Stadium, Manama
Attendance: 25,000
Referee: Graham Poll (England)

1–1 on aggregate. Bahrain won on the away-goals rule and advanced to the CONCACAF–AFC play-off.

== Goalscorers ==
There were 2 goals scored in 2 matches, for an average of 1 goal per match.

1 goal

- (Bahrain national football team) Talal Yousef
- (Uzbekistan national football team) Maksim Shatskikh
