= 2006 FIFA World Cup qualification – UEFA Group 4 =

Football tournament qualification stage

The 2006 FIFA World Cup qualification UEFA Group 4 was a UEFA qualifying group for the 2006 FIFA World Cup. The group comprised Cyprus, Faroe Islands, France, Republic of Ireland, Israel and Switzerland.

The group was won by France, who qualified for the 2006 FIFA World Cup. The runners-up Switzerland entered the UEFA qualification play-offs.

== Standings ==
Pos	Team	Pld	W	D	L	GF	GA	GD	Pts	Qualification	France national football team	Switzerland national football team	Israel national football team	Republic of Ireland national football team	Cyprus national football team	Faroe Islands national football team
1	France	10	5	5	0	14	2	+12	20	Qualification to 2006 FIFA World Cup	—	0–0	0–0	0–0	4–0	3–0
2	Switzerland	10	4	6	0	18	7	+11	18	Advance to second round	1–1	—	1–1	1–1	1–0	6–0
3	Israel	10	4	6	0	15	10	+5	18		1–1	2–2	—	1–1	2–1	2–1
4	Republic of Ireland	10	4	5	1	12	5	+7	17		0–1	0–0	2–2	—	3–0	2–0
5	Cyprus	10	1	1	8	8	20	−12	4		0–2	1–3	1–2	0–1	—	2–2
6	Faroe Islands	10	0	1	9	4	27	−23	1		0–2	1–3	0–2	0–2	0–3	—

Rules for classification: Tiebreakers

== Matches ==
4 September 2004
15:00

Republic of Ireland	3–0	Cyprus
Morrison 33'; Reid 38'; Keane 54'	(Report)

Lansdowne Road, Dublin
Attendance: 36,000
Referee: Levan Paniashvili (Georgia)
4 September 2004
17:30

Switzerland	6–0	Faroe Islands
Vonlanthen 10', 14', 57'; Rey 29', 44', 55'	(Report)

St. Jakob-Park, Basel
Attendance: 11,880
Referee: Alexandru Tudor (Romania)
4 September 2004
21:00

France	0–0	Israel
	(Report)

Stade de France, Saint-Denis
Attendance: 43,527
Referee: René Temmink (Netherlands)

8 September 2004
17:00

Faroe Islands	0–2	France
	(Report)	Giuly 32'; Cissé 73'

Tórsvøllur, Tórshavn
Attendance: 5,917
Referee: Craig Thomson (Scotland)
8 September 2004
20:30

Switzerland	1–1	Republic of Ireland
H. Yakin 17'	(Report)	Morrison 8'

St. Jakob-Park, Basel
Attendance: 28,000
Referee: Kyros Vassaras (Greece)
8 September 2004
20:50

Israel	2–1	Cyprus
Benayoun 64'; Badir 75'	(Report)	Konstantinou 59'

Ramat Gan Stadium, Ramat Gan
Attendance: 21,872
Referee: Sergey Shmolik (Belarus)

9 October 2004
20:00

Cyprus	2–2	Faroe Islands
Konstantinou 15'; Okkas 81'	(Report)	Jørgensen 21'; R. Jacobsen 43'

GSP Stadium, Nicosia
Attendance: 1,400
Referee: Zohrab Gadiyev (Azerbaijan)
9 October 2004
20:05

Israel	2–2	Switzerland
Benayoun 9', 48'	(Report)	Frei 26'; Vonlanthen 34'

Ramat Gan Stadium, Ramat Gan
Attendance: 37,976
Referee: Mark Shield (Australia)
9 October 2004
21:00

France	0–0	Republic of Ireland
	(Report)

Stade de France, Saint-Denis
Attendance: 78,863
Referee: Arturo Dauden Ibáñez (Spain)

13 October 2004
19:30

Republic of Ireland	2–0	Faroe Islands
Keane 14' (pen.), 32'	(Report)

Lansdowne Road, Dublin
Attendance: 36,000
Referee: Romans Lajuks (Latvia)
13 October 2004
21:45

Cyprus	0–2	France
	(Report)	Wiltord 38'; Henry 72'

GSP Stadium, Nicosia
Attendance: 3,319
Referee: Claus Bo Larsen (Denmark)

17 November 2004
19:00

Cyprus	1–2	Israel
Okkas 45'	(Report)	Keisi 17'; Nimni 86'

GSP Stadium, Nicosia
Attendance: 1,624
Referee: Sten Kaldma (Estonia)

26 March 2005
19:50

Israel	1–1	Republic of Ireland
Abbas Souan 90'	(Report)	Morrison 43'

Ramat Gan Stadium, Ramat Gan
Attendance: 32,150
Referee: Valentin Ivanov (Russia)
26 March 2005
21:00

France	0–0	Switzerland
	(Report)

Stade de France, Saint-Denis
Attendance: 79,373
Referee: Massimo De Santis (Italy)

30 March 2005
20:30

Switzerland	1–0	Cyprus
Frei 87'	(Report)

Hardturm, Zürich
Attendance: 16,066
Referee: Stuart Dougal (Scotland)
30 March 2005
20:50

Israel	1–1	France
Badir 83'	(Report)	Trezeguet 50'

Ramat Gan Stadium, Ramat Gan
Attendance: 32,150
Referee: Markus Merk (Germany)

4 June 2005
16:30

Faroe Islands	1–3	Switzerland
R. Jacobsen 70'	(Report)	Wicky 25'; Frei 72', 84'

Svangaskarð, Toftir
Attendance: 2,047
Referee: Serge Gumienny (Belgium)
4 June 2005
19:30

Republic of Ireland	2–2	Israel
Harte 5'; Keane 11'	(Report)	Avi Yehiel 39'; Avi Nimni 45+1'

Lansdowne Road, Dublin
Attendance: 36,000
Referee: Kyros Vassaras (Greece)

8 June 2005
19:30

Faroe Islands	0–2	Republic of Ireland
	(Report)	Harte 51'; Kilbane 59'

Tórsvøllur, Tórshavn
Attendance: 5,180
Referee: Anton Guenov (Bulgaria)

17 August 2005
19:00

Faroe Islands	0–3	Cyprus
	(Report)	Konstantinou 39', 77' (pen.); Krassas 95'

Svangaskarð, Toftir
Attendance: 2,720
Referee: Stefan Johannesson (Sweden)

3 September 2005
17:30

Switzerland	1–1	Israel
Frei 6'	(Report)	Keisi 20'

St. Jakob-Park, Basel
Attendance: 30,000
Referee: Roberto Rosetti (Italy)
3 September 2005
21:00

France	3–0	Faroe Islands
Cissé 14', 76'; Olsen 18' (o.g.)	(Report)

Stade Félix-Bollaert, Lens
Attendance: 40,126
Referee: Jaroslav Jára (Czech Republic)

7 September 2005
18:00

Faroe Islands	0–2	Israel
	(Report)	Nimni 54'; Katan 79'

Tórsvøllur, Tórshavn
Attendance: 2,240
Referee: Pieter Vink (Netherlands)
7 September 2005
19:55

Republic of Ireland	0–1	France
	(Report)	Henry 68'

Lansdowne Road, Dublin
Attendance: 36,000
Referee: Herbert Fandel (Germany)
7 September 2005
21:15

Cyprus	1–3	Switzerland
Aloneftis 35'	(Report)	Frei 15'; Senderos 71'; Gygax 84'

GSP Stadium, Nicosia
Attendance: 2,561
Referee: Nikolai Ivanov (Russia)

8 October 2005
20:00

Cyprus	0–1	Republic of Ireland
	(Report)	Elliott 6'

GSP Stadium, Nicosia
Attendance: 13,546
Referee: Viktor Kassai (Hungary)
8 October 2005
20:45

Switzerland	1–1	France
Magnin 80'	(Report)	Cissé 53'

Stade de Suisse Wankdorf, Bern
Attendance: 31,400
Referee: Terje Hauge (Norway)
8 October 2005
21:10

Israel	2–1	Faroe Islands
Benayoun 1'; Zandberg 90+1'	(Report)	Samuelsen 90+3'

Ramat Gan Stadium, Ramat Gan
Attendance: 31,857
Referee: Bernhard Brugger (Austria)

12 October 2005
19:45

Republic of Ireland	0–0	Switzerland
	(Report)

Lansdowne Road, Dublin
Attendance: 35,944
Referee: Markus Merk (Germany)
12 October 2005
20:45

France	4–0	Cyprus
Zidane 29'; Wiltord 32'; Dhorasoo 44'; Giuly 84'	(Report)

Stade de France, Saint-Denis
Attendance: 78,864
Referee: Wolfgang Stark (Germany)

== Goalscorers ==
There were 71 goals scored in 30 matches, for an average of 2.37 goals per match.

6 goals

- (Switzerland) Alexander Frei

4 goals

- (Cyprus) Michalis Konstantinou
- (France) Djibril Cissé
- (Republic of Ireland) Robbie Keane
- (Israel) Yossi Benayoun
- (Switzerland) Johan Vonlanthen

3 goals

- (Republic of Ireland) Clinton Morrison
- (Israel) Avi Nimni
- (Switzerland) Alexandre Rey

2 goals

- (Cyprus) Ioannis Okkas
- (Faroe Islands) Rógvi Jacobsen
- (France) Ludovic Giuly
- (France) Thierry Henry
- (France) Sylvain Wiltord
- (Republic of Ireland) Ian Harte
- (Israel) Walid Badir
- (Israel) Adoram Keisi

1 goal

- (Cyprus) Efstathios Aloneftis
- (Cyprus) Asimakis Krassas
- (Faroe Islands) Claus Bech Jørgensen
- (Faroe Islands) Símun Samuelsen
- (France) Vikash Dhorasoo
- (France) David Trezeguet
- (France) Zinedine Zidane
- (Republic of Ireland) Stephen Elliott
- (Republic of Ireland) Kevin Kilbane
- (Republic of Ireland) Andy Reid
- (Israel) Yaniv Katan
- (Israel) Abbas Souan
- (Israel) Avi Yehiel
- (Israel) Michael Zandberg
- (Switzerland) Daniel Gygax
- (Switzerland) Ludovic Magnin
- (Switzerland) Philippe Senderos
- (Switzerland) Raphaël Wicky
- (Switzerland) Hakan Yakin

1 own goal

- (Faroe Islands) Súni Olsen (against France)
