= 2006 FIFA World Cup qualification – UEFA Group 8 =

Football tournament qualification stage

The 2006 FIFA World Cup qualification UEFA Group 8 was a UEFA qualifying group for the 2006 FIFA World Cup. The group comprised Bulgaria, Croatia, Hungary, Iceland, Malta and Sweden.

The group was won by Croatia, who qualified for the 2006 FIFA World Cup. The runners-up Sweden also qualified as one of two best runners-up.

== Standings ==
Pos	Team	Pld	W	D	L	GF	GA	GD	Pts	Qualification	Croatia national football team	Sweden men's national football team	Bulgaria national football team	Hungary national football team	Iceland national football team	Malta national football team
1	Croatia	10	7	3	0	21	5	+16	24	Qualification to 2006 FIFA World Cup	—	1–0	2–2	3–0	4–0	3–0
2	Sweden	10	8	0	2	30	4	+26	24	Qualification to 2006 FIFA World Cup	0–1	—	3–0	3–0	3–1	6–0
3	Bulgaria	10	4	3	3	17	17	0	15		1–3	0–3	—	2–0	3–2	4–1
4	Hungary	10	4	2	4	13	14	−1	14		0–0	0–1	1–1	—	3–2	4–0
5	Iceland	10	1	1	8	14	27	−13	4		1–3	1–4	1–3	2–3	—	4–1
6	Malta	10	0	3	7	4	32	−28	3		1–1	0–7	1–1	0–2	0–0	—

Rules for classification: Tiebreakers

== Matches ==
4 September 2004
16:00

Iceland	1–3	Bulgaria
Guðjohnsen 51' (pen.)	(Report)	Berbatov 35', 49'; Yanev 62'

Laugardalsvöllur, Reykjavík
Attendance: 5,014
Referee: Alain Hamer (Luxembourg)
4 September 2004
20:30

Croatia	3–0	Hungary
Pršo 31'; Klasnić 54'; Gyepes 80' (o.g.)	(Report)

Maksimir Stadium, Zagreb
Attendance: 20,853
Referee: Mike Riley (England)
4 September 2004
20:45

Malta	0–7	Sweden
	(Report)	Ibrahimović 4', 11', 14', 71'; Ljungberg 46', 74'; Larsson 76'

Ta' Qali Stadium, Ta' Qali
Attendance: 4,200
Referee: Haim Jakov (Israel)

8 September 2004
20:15

Sweden	0–1	Croatia
	(Report)	Srna 64'

Ullevi, Gothenburg
Attendance: 40,023
Referee: Arturo Dauden Ibáñez (Spain)
8 September 2004
21:15

Hungary	3–2	Iceland
Gera 62'; Torghelle 75'; Szabics 79'	(Report)	Guðjohnsen 39'; I. Sigurðsson 78'

Szusza Ferenc Stadium, Budapest
Attendance: 5,461
Referee: Tom Henning Øvrebø (Norway)

9 October 2004
17:00

Sweden	3–0	Hungary
Ljungberg 26'; Larsson 50'; Svensson 67'	(Report)

Råsunda Stadium, Solna Municipality
Attendance: 32,288
Referee: Stuart Dougal (Scotland)
9 October 2004
18:15

Malta	0–0	Iceland
	(Report)

Ta' Qali Stadium, Ta' Qali
Attendance: 1,130
Referee: Sorin Corpodean (Romania)
9 October 2004
20:15

Croatia	2–2	Bulgaria
Srna 15', 31' (pen.)	(Report)	M. Petrov 77'; Berbatov 86'

Maksimir Stadium, Zagreb
Attendance: 31,565
Referee: Pierluigi Collina (Italy)

13 October 2004
18:00

Bulgaria	4–1	Malta
Berbatov 43', 55'; Yanev 47'; Yankov 88'	(Report)	Mifsud 11'

Vasil Levski National Stadium, Sofia
Attendance: 16,800
Referee: Ceri Richards (Wales)
13 October 2004
18:10

Iceland	1–4	Sweden
Guðjohnsen 66'	(Report)	Larsson 24', 39'; Allbäck 27'; Wilhelmsson 45'

Laugardalsvöllur, Reykjavík
Attendance: 7,037
Referee: Massimo Busacca (Switzerland)

17 November 2004
19:30

Malta	0–2	Hungary
	(Report)	Gera 39'; Kovács 93'

Ta' Qali Stadium, Ta' Qali
Attendance: 14,500
Referee: Tony Asumaa (Finland)

26 March 2005
17:30

Bulgaria	0–3	Sweden
	(Report)	Ljungberg 17', 90+2' (pen.); Edman 74'

Vasil Levski National Stadium, Sofia
Attendance: 42,530
Referee: Herbert Fandel (Germany)
26 March 2005
18:00

Croatia	4–0	Iceland
N. Kovač 38', 75'; Šimunić 70'; Pršo 90+1'	(Report)

Maksimir Stadium, Zagreb
Attendance: 17,912
Referee: Jerome Damon (South Africa)

30 March 2005
18:00

Croatia	3–0	Malta
Pršo 22', 35'; Tudor 79'	(Report)

Maksimir Stadium, Zagreb
Attendance: 15,510
Referee: Costas Kapitanis (Cyprus)
30 March 2005
20:45

Hungary	1–1	Bulgaria
Rajczi 90'	(Report)	S. Petrov 51'

Szusza Ferenc Stadion, Budapest
Attendance: 11,586
Referee: Jan Wegereef (Netherlands)

4 June 2005
17:15

Sweden	6–0	Malta
Jonson 6'; Svensson 18'; Wilhelmsson 29'; Ibrahimović 40'; Ljungberg 57'; Elmander 81'	(Report)

Ullevi, Gothenburg
Attendance: 35,593
Referee: Nikolai Ivanov (Russia)
4 June 2005
18:00

Bulgaria	1–3	Croatia
M. Petrov 72'	(Report)	Babić 19'; Tudor 57'; Kranjčar 80'

Vasil Levski National Stadium, Sofia
Attendance: 35,000
Referee: Kim Milton Nielsen (Denmark)
4 June 2005
18:05

Iceland	2–3	Hungary
Guðjohnsen 17'; K. Sigurðsson 68'	(Report)	Gera 45', 56'; Huszti 73'

Laugardalsvöllur, Reykjavík
Attendance: 4,613
Referee: Lucílio Batista (Portugal)

8 June 2005
18:05

Iceland	4–1	Malta
Þorvaldsson 27'; Guðjohnsen 33'; Guðmundsson 74'; V. Gunnarsson 84'	(Report)	Said 58'

Laugardalsvöllur, Reykjavík
Attendance: 4,887
Referee: Damir Skomina (Slovenia)

3 September 2005
17:15

Sweden	3–0	Bulgaria
Ljungberg 60'; Mellberg 75'; Ibrahimović 90'	(Report)

Råsunda Stadium, Solna Municipality
Attendance: 35,000
Referee: Frank De Bleeckere (Belgium)
3 September 2005
18:05

Iceland	1–3	Croatia
Guðjohnsen 24'	(Report)	Balaban 56', 61'; Srna 82'

Laugardalsvöllur, Reykjavík
Attendance: 5,520
Referee: Wolfgang Stark (Germany)
3 September 2005
20:45

Hungary	4–0	Malta
Torghelle 34'; Said 55' (o.g.); Takács 64'; Rajczi 85'	(Report)

Stadium Puskás Ferenc, Budapest
Attendance: 5,900
Referee: Vitaliy Godulyan (Ukraine)

7 September 2005
18:45

Malta	1–1	Croatia
Wellman 74'	(Report)	Kranjčar 19'

Ta' Qali Stadium, Ta' Qali
Attendance: 916
Referee: Athanassios Briakos (Greece)
7 September 2005
19:00

Bulgaria	3–2	Iceland
Berbatov 21'; Iliev 69'; M. Petrov 86'	(Report)	Steinsson 9'; Hreiðarsson 16'

Vasil Levski National Stadium, Sofia
Attendance: 18,000
Referee: Bülent Demirlek (Turkey)
7 September 2005
20:45

Hungary	0–1	Sweden
	(Report)	Ibrahimović 90+1'

Stadium Puskás Ferenc, Budapest
Attendance: 20,161
Referee: Stefano Farina (Italy)

8 October 2005
18:00

Bulgaria	2–0	Hungary
Berbatov 29'; Lazarov 55'	(Report)

Vasil Levski National Stadium, Sofia
Attendance: 4,652
Referee: Dejan Delević (Serbia and Montenegro)
8 October 2005
20:15

Croatia	1–0	Sweden
Srna 55'	(Report)

Maksimir Stadium, Zagreb
Attendance: 34,015
Referee: Massimo De Santis (Italy)

12 October 2005
19:00

Malta	1–1	Bulgaria
Barbara 79'	(Report)	Yankov 67'

Ta' Qali Stadium, Ta' Qali
Attendance: 2,844
Referee: Vitaliy Godulyan (Ukraine)
12 October 2005
19:30

Sweden	3–1	Iceland
Ibrahimović 29'; Larsson 42'; Källström 90+1'	(Report)	Árnason 11'

Råsunda Stadium, Solna Municipality
Attendance: 33,716
Referee: Valentin Ivanov (Russia)
12 October 2005
19:30

Hungary	0–0	Croatia
	(Report)

Szusza Ferenc Stadium, Budapest
Attendance: 6,979
Referee: Claus Bo Larsen (Denmark)

== Goalscorers ==
There were 99 goals scored in 30 matches, for an average of 3.3 goals per match.

8 goals

- (Sweden) Zlatan Ibrahimović

7 goals

- (Bulgaria) Dimitar Berbatov
- (Sweden) Freddie Ljungberg

6 goals

- (Iceland) Eiður Guðjohnsen

5 goals

- (Croatia) Darijo Srna
- (Sweden) Henrik Larsson

4 goals

- (Croatia) Dado Pršo
- (Hungary) Zoltán Gera

3 goals

- (Bulgaria) Martin Petrov

2 goals

- (Bulgaria) Hristo Yanev
- (Bulgaria) Chavdar Yankov
- (Croatia) Boško Balaban
- (Croatia) Niko Kovač
- (Croatia) Niko Kranjčar
- (Croatia) Igor Tudor
- (Hungary) Péter Rajczi
- (Hungary) Sándor Torghelle
- (Sweden) Anders Svensson
- (Sweden) Christian Wilhelmsson

1 goal

- (Bulgaria) Georgi Iliev
- (Bulgaria) Zdravko Lazarov
- (Bulgaria) Stiliyan Petrov
- (Croatia) Marko Babić
- (Croatia) Ivan Klasnić
- (Croatia) Josip Šimunić
- (Hungary) Szabolcs Huszti
- (Hungary) Péter Kovács
- (Hungary) Imre Szabics
- (Hungary) Ákos Takács
- (Iceland) Kári Árnason
- (Iceland) Veigar Páll Gunnarsson
- (Iceland) Tryggvi Guðmundsson
- (Iceland) Hermann Hreiðarsson
- (Iceland) Indriði Sigurðsson
- (Iceland) Kristján Örn Sigurðsson
- (Iceland) Grétar Steinsson
- (Iceland) Gunnar Heiðar Þorvaldsson
- (Malta) Etienne Barbara
- (Malta) Michael Mifsud
- (Malta) Brian Said
- (Malta) Stephen Wellman
- (Sweden) Marcus Allbäck
- (Sweden) Erik Edman
- (Sweden) Johan Elmander
- (Sweden) Mattias Jonson
- (Sweden) Kim Källström
- (Sweden) Olof Mellberg

1 own goal

- (Hungary) Gábor Gyepes (against Croatia)
- (Malta) Brian Said (against Hungary)
