= Austria national football team results (2000–2019) =

- Win Draw Loss

This article provides details of international football matches played by the Austria national football team from 2000 to 2019.

== Results ==
=== 2000 ===
23 February 2000 Friendly	Greece	4–1	Austria	Kalamata, Greece
16:30 (UTC+2)	Georgiadis 36', 55'; Ouzounidis 82'; Lakis 90'	Report	Vastić 45'	Stadium: Messiniakos Stadium; Attendance: 3,500; Referee: Hugh Dallas (Scotland)

29 March 2000 Friendly	Austria	1–1	Sweden	Graz, Austria
19:30 (UTC+2)	Flögel 17'	Report	Pettersson 86'	Stadium: Arnold Schwarzenegger Stadium; Attendance: 9,120; Referee: Alain Hamer (Luxembourg)

26 April 2000 Friendly	Austria	1–2	Croatia	Vienna, Austria
20:30 (UTC+2)	Vastić 17'	Report	Flögel 28' (o.g.); Stanić 66'	Stadium: Ernst-Happel Stadion; Attendance: 14,500; Referee: Lutz-Michael Fröhlich (Germany)

16 August 2000 Friendly	Hungary	1–1	Austria	Budapest, Hungary
20:30 (UTC+2)	Illés 33'	Report	Kirchler 67'	Stadium: Népstadion; Attendance: 3,500; Referee: Jaroslav Jára (Czech Republic)

1 September 2000 Friendly	Austria	5–1	Iran	Vienna, Austria
20:30 (UTC+2)	Herzog 39'; Kocijan 44'; Mayrleb 47', 68'; Kühbauer 66'	Report	Majidi 7'	Stadium: Ernst-Happel Stadion; Attendance: 24,000; Referee: Goran Marić (Croatia)

7 October 2000 2002 World Cup qualification	Liechtenstein	0–1	Austria	Vaduz, Liechtenstein
20:30 (UTC+2)		Report	Flögel 20'	Stadium: Rheinpark; Attendance: 3,548; Referee: John Rowbotham (Scotland)

11 October 2000 2002 World Cup qualification	Austria	1–1	Spain	Vienna, Austria
20:30 (UTC+2)	Baur 22'	Report	Baraja 27'	Stadium: Ernst-Happel-Stadion; Attendance: 48,000; Referee: Valentin Ivanov (Russia)

=== 2001 ===
28 February 2000 Friendly	Croatia	1–0	Austria	Rijeka, Croatia
18:00	Vugrinec 35'	Report		Stadium: Stadion Kantrida; Attendance: 3,500; Referee: Leif Sundell (Sweden)

24 March 2001 2002 World Cup qualification	Bosnia and Herzegovina	1–1	Austria	Sarajevo, Bosnia and Herzegovina
20:30	Barbarez 43'	Report	Baur 61'	Stadium: Koševo Stadium; Attendance: 25,000; Referee: Tom Henning Øvrebø (Norway)

28 March 2001 2002 World Cup qualification	Austria	2–1	Israel	Vienna, Austria
20:30 (UTC+2)	Baur 9'; Herzog 42' (pen.)	Report	Baur 6' (o.g.)	Stadium: Ernst-Happel-Stadion; Attendance: 21,000; Referee: Alfredo Trentalange (Italy)

25 April 2001 2002 World Cup qualification	Austria	2–0	Liechtenstein	Innsbruck, Austria
20:30 (UTC+2)	Glieder 44'; Flögel 75'	Report		Stadium: Tivoli-Neu; Attendance: 13,060; Referee: David Malcolm (Northern Ireland)

15 August 2001 Friendly	Austria	1–2	Switzerland	Vienna, Austria
20:30 (UTC+2)	Herzog 51'	Report	Vogel 10'; H. Yakin 74'	Stadium: Ernst-Happel Stadion; Attendance: 21,200; Referee: Nicolai Vollquartz (Denmark)

1 September 2001 2002 World Cup qualification	Spain	4–0	Austria	Valencia, Spain
22:00 (UTC+2)	Tristán 45'; Morientes 79', 84'; Mendieta 90+1'	Report		Stadium: Estadio Mestalla; Attendance: 31,661; Referee: Horacio Elizondo (Argentina)

5 September 2001 2002 World Cup qualification	Austria	2–0	Bosnia and Herzegovina	Vienna, Austria
20:30 (UTC+2)	Herzog 38', 87'	Report		Stadium: Ernst-Happel-Stadion; Attendance: 23,200; Referee: Graham Barber (England)

27 October 2001 2002 World Cup qualification	Israel	1–1	Austria	Ramat Gan, Israel
19:30 (UTC+2)	Gershon 55' (pen.)	Report	Herzog 90+1'	Stadium: Ramat Gan Stadium; Attendance: 40,000; Referee: Vítor Melo Pereira (Portugal)
Note: The game was originally scheduled for 7 October 2001. On 4 October FIFA announced postponement of the match for safety reasons after a plane departed from Tel Aviv crashed in the Black Sea.

10 November 2001 2002 World Cup qualification play-offs	Austria	0–1	Turkey	Vienna, Austria
20:30		Report	Buruk 60'	Stadium: Ernst Happel Stadion; Attendance: 50,000; Referee: Manuel Mejuto González (Spain)

14 November 2001 2002 World Cup qualification play-offs	Turkey	5–0 (6–0 agg.)	Austria	Istanbul, Turkey
19:30	Baştürk 21'; Şükür 31'; Buruk 45'; Erdem 69', 85'	Report		Stadium: Ali Sami Yen Stadium; Attendance: 22,000; Referee: Pierluigi Collina (Italy)

=== 2002 ===
27 March 2002 Friendly	Austria	2–0	Slovakia	Graz, Austria
20:30	Brunmayr 64'; Weissenberger 78'	Report		Stadium: Arnold Schwarzenegger Stadium; Attendance: 9,100; Referee: Edgar Steinborn (Germany)

17 April 2002 Friendly	Austria	0–0	Cameroon	Vienna, Austria
20:30 (UTC+2)		Report		Stadium: Ernst-Happel Stadion; Attendance: 32,100; Referee: Massimo Busacca (Switzerland)

18 May 2002 Friendly	Germany	6–2	Austria	Leverkusen, Germany
19:00 (UTC+2)	Klose 15', 29', 53'; Bode 36', 70'; Bierofka 83'	Report	Aufhauser 37'; Wallner 46'	Stadium: BayArena; Attendance: 21,500; Referee: Massimo Busacca (Switzerland)

21 August 2002 Friendly	Switzerland	3–2	Austria	Basel, Switzerland
20:30 (UTC+2)	H. Yakin 19'; Frei 41'; M. Yakin 75'	Report	Wallner 11', 81'	Stadium: St. Jakob-Park; Attendance: 23,500; Referee: Roberto Rosetti (Italy)

7 September 2002 Euro 2004 qualifying	Austria	2–0	Moldova	Vienna, Austria
17:00 UTC+2	Herzog 4' (pen.), 30' (pen.)	Report		Stadium: Ernst-Happel-Stadion; Attendance: 18,300; Referee: Stuart Dougal (Scotland)

12 October 2002 Euro 2004 qualifying	Belarus	0–2	Austria	Minsk, Belarus
18:30 UTC+3		Report	Schopp 58'; Akagündüz 88'	Stadium: Dinamo Stadium; Attendance: 15,082; Referee: Eric Poulat (France)

16 October 2002 Euro 2004 qualifying	Austria	0–3	Netherlands	Vienna, Austria
20:30 UTC+2		Report	Seedorf 15'; Cocu 20'; Makaay 30'	Stadium: Ernst-Happel-Stadion; Attendance: 46,100; Referee: Pierluigi Collina (Italy)

20 November 2002 Friendly	Austria	0–1	Norway	Vienna, Austria
20:30		Report	Kah 81'	Stadium: Gerhard Hanappi Stadium; Attendance: 15,800; Referee: Attila Ábrahám (Hungary)

=== 2003 ===
26 March 2003 Friendly	Austria	2–2	Greece	Graz, Austria
20:30	Schopp 54'; Haas 81'	Report	Tsiartas 48' (pen.); Kafes 52'	Stadium: Arnold Schwarzenegger Stadium; Attendance: 8,500; Referee: Tom Henning Øvrebø (Norway)

2 April 2003 Euro 2004 qualifying	Czech Republic	4–0	Austria	Prague, Czech Republic
20:30 UTC+2	Nedvěd 18'; Koller 32', 62'; Jankulovski 56' (pen.)	Report		Stadium: Toyota Arena; Attendance: 17,150; Referee: Antonio Jesús López Nieto (Spain)

30 April 2003 Friendly	Scotland	0–2	Austria	Glasgow, Scotland
20:00		Report	Kirchler 28'; Haas 33'	Stadium: Hampden Park; Attendance: 12,189; Referee: Nicolai Vollquartz (Denmark)

7 June 2003 Euro 2004 qualifying	Moldova	1–0	Austria	Tiraspol, Moldova
19:00 UTC+3	Frunză 60'	Report		Stadium: Sheriff Stadium; Attendance: 3,864; Referee: Joaquim Paulo Paraty da Silva (Portugal)

11 June 2003 Euro 2004 qualifying	Austria	5–0	Belarus	Innsbruck, Austria
20:30 UTC+2	Aufhauser 33'; Haas 47'; Kirchler 53'; Wallner 62'; Cerny 70'	Report		Stadium: Tivoli Neu; Attendance: 8,100; Referee: Peter Fröjdfeldt (Sweden)

20 August 2003 Friendly	Austria	2–0	Costa Rica	Vienna, Austria
20:30 (UTC+2)	Glieder 34' (pen.); Wallner 70'	Report		Stadium: Ernst-Happel-Stadion; Attendance: 16,000; Referee: Alain Hamer (Luxembourg)

6 September 2003 Euro 2004 qualifying	Netherlands	3–1	Austria	Rotterdam, Netherlands
20:30 UTC+2	Van der Vaart 29'; Kluivert 60'; Cocu 62'	Report	Pogatetz 32'	Stadium: De Kuip; Attendance: 45,000; Referee: Eric Poulat (France)

11 October 2003 Euro 2004 qualifying	Austria	2–3	Czech Republic	Vienna, Austria
17:00 UTC+2	Haas 49'; Ivanschitz 77'	Report	Jankulovski 26'; Vachoušek 78'; Koller 90'	Stadium: Ernst-Happel-Stadion; Attendance: 32,350; Referee: Georgios Kasnaferis (Greece)

=== 2004 ===
31 March 2004 Friendly	Slovakia	1–1	Austria	Bratislava, Slovakia
20:30 (UTC+2)	Mintál 72'	Report	Kollmann 90'	Stadium: Tehelné pole Attendance: 4,500; Referee: Karel Vidlák (Czech Republic)

28 April 2004 Friendly	Austria	4–1	Luxembourg	Innsbruck, Austria
20:30 (UTC+2)	Kirchler 5'; Kiesenebner 9'; Haas 85'; Kollmann 88'	Report	Huss 63'	Stadium: Tivoli Neu; Attendance: 9,400; Referee: Damir Skomina (Slovakia)

25 May 2004 Friendly	Austria	0–0	Russia	Graz, Austria
19:00 (UTC+2)		Report		Stadium: Arnold Schwarzenegger Stadium; Attendance: 9,600; Referee: Mikko Vuorela (Finland)

18 August 2004 Friendly	Austria	1–3	Germany	Vienna, Austria
20:45 (UTC+2)	Amerhauser 10'	Report	Kurányi 2', 61', 73'	Stadium: Ernst-Happel-Stadion; Attendance: 38,000; Referee: Pierluigi Collina (Italy)

4 September 2004 2006 World Cup qualification	Austria	2–2	England	Vienna, Austria
20:30	Kollmann 71'; Ivanschitz 72'	(Report)	Lampard 24'; Gerrard 65'	Stadium: Ernst-Happel-Stadion; Attendance: 48,000; Referee: Ľuboš Micheľ (Slovakia)

8 September 2004 2006 World Cup qualification	Austria	2–0	Azerbaijan	Vienna, Austria
20:30	Stranzl 23'; Kollmann 44'	(Report)		Stadium: Ernst-Happel-Stadion; Attendance: 26,400; Referee: Lawrence Sammut (Malta)

9 October 2004 2006 World Cup qualification	Austria	1–3	Poland	Vienna, Austria
20:30	Schopp 30'	(Report)	Kałużny 10'; Krzynówek 78'; Frankowski 90'	Stadium: Ernst-Happel-Stadion; Attendance: 46,100; Referee: Lucílio Batista (Portugal)

13 October 2004 2006 World Cup qualification	Northern Ireland	3–3	Austria	Belfast, Northern Ireland
19:45	Healy 36'; Murdock 58'; Elliott 93'	(Report)	Schopp 14', 72'; Mayrleb 59'	Stadium: Windsor Park; Attendance: 11,810; Referee: Mark Shield (Australia)

=== 2005 ===
8 February 2005 2005 Cyprus International Tournament	Cyprus	1–1 (a.e.t.) (5–4 p)	Austria	Limassol, Cyprus
18:45 (UTC+2)	Charalambidis 90'	Report	Kirchler 43'	Stadium: Tsirio Stadium; Attendance: 300; Referee: Jouni Hyytiä (Finland)

9 February 2005 2005 Cyprus International Tournament	Latvia	1–1 (a.e.t.) (5–3 p)	Austria	Limassol, Cyprus
18:45 (UTC+2)	Višņakovs 70'	Report	Sariyar 41'	Stadium: Tsirio Stadium; Attendance: 50; Referee: Costas Theodotou (Cyprus)

26 March 2005 2006 World Cup qualification	Wales	0–2	Austria	Cardiff, Wales
15:00		(Report)	Vastić 81'; Stranzl 85'	Stadium: Millennium Stadium; Attendance: 47,760; Referee: Paul Allaerts (Belgium)

30 March 2005 2006 World Cup qualification	Austria	1–0	Wales	Vienna, Austria
20:30	Aufhauser 87'	(Report)		Stadium: Ernst-Happel-Stadion; Attendance: 29,500; Referee: Manuel Mejuto González (Spain)

17 August 2005 Friendly	Austria	2–2	Scotland	Graz, Austria
20:30 (UTC+2)	Ibertsberger 83'; Standfest 87'	Report	Miller 3'; O'Connor 38'	Stadium: Arnold Schwarzenegger Stadium; Attendance: 13,800; Referee: Selçuk Dereli (Turkey)

3 September 2005 2006 World Cup qualification	Poland	3–2	Austria	Chorzów, Poland
20:30	Smolarek 13'; Kosowski 22'; Żurawski 67'	(Report)	Linz 61', 80'	Stadium: Stadion Śląski; Attendance: 40,000; Referee: Massimo De Santis (Italy)

7 September 2005 2006 World Cup qualification	Azerbaijan	0–0	Austria	Baku, Azerbaijan
21:00		(Report)		Stadium: Tofiq Bahramov Republican Stadium; Attendance: 2,800; Referee: Johan Verbist (Belgium)

8 October 2005 2006 World Cup qualification	England	1–0	Austria	Manchester, England
16:00	Lampard 24' (pen.)	(Report)		Stadium: Old Trafford; Attendance: 64,822; Referee: Luis Medina Cantalejo (Spain)

12 October 2005 2006 World Cup qualification	Austria	2–0	Northern Ireland	Vienna, Austria
20:30	Aufhauser 44', 90'	(Report)		Stadium: Ernst-Happel-Stadion; Attendance: 12,500; Referee: Athanassios Briakos (Greece)

=== 2006 ===
1 March 2006 Friendly	Austria	0–2	Canada	Vienna, Austria
20:30		Report	Brennan 65', 71'	Stadium: Ernst-Happel Stadion; Attendance: 9,000; Referee: Dick van Egmond (Netherlands)

23 May 2006 Friendly	Austria	1–4	Croatia	Vienna, Austria
20:30 (UTC+2)	Ivanschitz 14'	Report	Klasnić 11', 35'; Babić 55'; Balaban 69'	Stadium: Ernst-Happel Stadion; Attendance: 14,500; Referee: Herbert Fandel (Germany)

16 August 2006 Friendly	Austria	1–2	Hungary	Graz, Austria
20:30 (UTC+2)	Kuljić 74'	Report	Gera 11'; Horváth 37'	Stadium: UPC-Arena; Attendance: 12,000; Referee: Richard Havrilla (Slovakia)

2 September 2006 Friendly	Austria	2–2	Costa Rica	Geneva, Switzerland
20:15 (UTC+2)	Linz 36' (pen.), 60'	Report	Saborío 16' (pen.), 40'	Stadium: Stade de Genève; Attendance: 300; Referee: Claudio Circhetta (Switzerland)

6 September 2006 Friendly	Austria	0–1	Venezuela	Basel, Switzerland
19:15 (UTC+2)		Report	De Ornelas 9'	Stadium: St. Jakob-Park; Attendance: 1,453; Referee: Carlo Bertolini (Switzerland)

6 October 2006 Friendly	Liechtenstein	1–2	Austria	Vaduz, Liechtenstein
18:00 (UTC+2)	Frick 68'	Report	Garics 77'; Prager 84'	Stadium: Rheinpark Stadion; Attendance: 3,750; Referee: René Rogalla (Switzerland)

11 October 2006 Friendly	Austria	2–1	Switzerland	Innsbruck, Austria
20:30 (UTC+2)	Linz 24' (pen.); Kuljić 36'	Report	Streller 70' (o.g.)	Stadium: Tivoli Neu; Attendance: 11,000; Referee: Michael Svendsen (Denmark)

17 November 2006 Friendly	Austria	4–1	Trinidad and Tobago	Vienna, Austria
20:30	Aufhauser 14', 25', 44'; Feldhofer 80'	Report	Samuel 23'	Stadium: Ernst-Happel Stadion; Attendance: 13,100; Referee: Radek Matějek (Czech Republic)

=== 2007 ===
7 February 2007 Friendly	Malta	1–1	Austria	Ta'Qali, Malta
18:00	Agius 8'	Report	Ivanschitz 49'	Stadium: National Stadium; Attendance: 3,000; Referee: Carlo Bertolini (Switzerland)

24 March 2007 Friendly	Austria	1–1	Ghana	Graz, Austria
20:30	Aufhauser 55'	Report	Muntari 87'	Stadium: UPC-Arena; Attendance: 10,608; Referee: Johan Verbist (Belgium)

28 March 2007 Friendly	France	1–0	Austria	Saint-Denis, France
21:00 (UTC+2)	Benzema 53'	Report		Stadium: Stade de France; Attendance: 68,403; Referee: Athanassios Briakos (Greece)

30 May 2007 Friendly	Austria	0–1	Scotland	Vienna, Austria
20:30 (UTC+2)		Report	O'Connor 59'	Stadium: Gerhard Hanappi Stadium; Attendance: 13,200; Referee: Zsolt Szabó (Hungary)

2 June 2007 Friendly	Austria	0–0	Paraguay	Vienna, Austria
17:00 (UTC+2)		Report		Stadium: Gerhard Hanappi Stadium; Attendance: 12,700; Referee: Ivan Bebek (Croatia)

22 August 2007 Friendly	Austria	1–1	Czech Republic	Vienna, Austria
20:30 (UTC+2)	Harnik 78'	Report	Koller 33'	Stadium: Ernst-Happel Stadion; Attendance: 24,500; Referee: Eduardo Iturralde González (Spain)

7 September 2007 Turnier der Kontinente	Austria	0–0 (4–3 p)	Japan	Klagenfurt, Austria
20:30 (UTC+2)				Stadium: Hypo-Arena; Attendance: 26,142; Referee: Markus Merk (Germany)

11 September 2007 Turnier der Kontinente	Austria	0–2	Chile	Vienna, Austria
20:30 (UTC+2)		Report	Droguett 66'; Rubio 84'	Stadium: Ernst-Happel Stadion; Attendance: 12,000; Referee: Jacek Granat (Poland)

13 October 2007 Friendly	Switzerland	3–1	Austria	Zürich, Switzerland
20:30 (UTC+2)	Streller 2', 55'; H. Yakin 36'	Report	Aufhauser 11'	Stadium: Letzigrund; Attendance: 22,500; Referee: Alain Hamer (Luxembourg)

17 October 2007 Friendly	Austria	3–2	Ivory Coast	Innsbruck, Austria
20:30 (UTC+2)	Kuljić 30' (pen.); Ivanschitz 64' (pen.); Standfest 74'	Report	Drogba 53', 90' (pen.)	Stadium: Tivoli-Neu; Attendance: 28,500; Referee: Björn Kuipers (Netherlands)

16 November 2007 Friendly	Austria	0–1	England	Vienna, Austria
20:00		Report	Crouch 44'	Stadium: Ernst-Happel Stadion; Attendance: 39,432; Referee: Nicolai Vollquartz (Denmark)

21 November 2007 Friendly	Austria	0–0	Tunisia	Vienna, Austria
20:30		Report		Stadium: Ernst-Happel Stadion; Attendance: 13,800; Referee: Pavel Olšiak (Slovakia)

=== 2008 ===
6 February 2008 Friendly	Austria	0–3	Germany	Vienna, Austria
20:00		Report	Hitzlsperger 53'; Klose 63'; Gómez 80'	Stadium: Ernst-Happel Stadion; Attendance: 48,500; Referee: Paolo Dondarini (Italy)

26 March 2008 Friendly	Austria	3–4	Netherlands	Vienna, Austria
20:30 (UTC+2)	Ivanschitz 6'; Prödl 18', 35'	Report	Huntelaar 37', 86'; Heitinga 67'; Vennegoor of Hesselink 82'	Stadium: Ernst-Happel Stadion; Attendance: 40,500; Referee: Martin Hansson (Sweden)

27 May 2008 Friendly	Austria	1–1	Nigeria	Graz, Austria
20:30 (UTC+2)	Kienast 12'	Report	Uche 19'	Stadium: UPC-Arena; Attendance: 15,000; Referee: Serge Gumienny (Belgium)

30 May 2008 Friendly	Austria	5–1	Malta	Graz, Austria
20:30 (UTC+2)	Aufhauser 8'; Linz 11', 67'; Vastić 77'; Harnik 90'	Report	Mifsud 41'	Stadium: UPC-Arena; Attendance: 14,200; Referee: Robert Krajnc (Slovenia)

8 June 2008 Euro 2008 Group B	Austria	0–1	Croatia	Vienna, Austria
18:00 (UTC+2)		Report	Modrić 4' (pen.)	Stadium: Ernst-Happel Stadion; Attendance: 51,428; Referee: Pieter Vink (Netherlands)

12 June 2008 Euro 2008 Group B	Austria	1–1	Poland	Vienna, Austria
20:45 (UTC+2)	Vastić 90+3' (pen.)	Report	Roger 30'	Stadium: Ernst-Happel Stadion; Attendance: 51,428; Referee: Howard Webb (England)

16 June 2008 Euro 2008 Group B	Austria	0–1	Germany	Vienna, Austria
20:45 (UTC+2)		Report	Ballack 49'	Stadium: Ernst-Happel Stadion; Attendance: 51,428; Referee: Manuel Mejuto González (Spain)

20 August 2008 Friendly	Italy	2–2	Austria	Nice, France
20:45 (UTC+2)	Gilardino 45+1'; Özcan 68' (o.g.)	Report	Pogatetz 14'; Janko 39'	Stadium: Stade du Ray; Attendance: 12,000; Referee: Bruno Coué (France)

6 September 2008 2010 World Cup qualification	Austria	3–1	France	Vienna, Austria
20:45 UTC+2	Janko 8'; Aufhauser 41'; Ivanschitz 72' (pen.)	Report	Govou 61'	Stadium: Ernst-Happel Stadion; Attendance: 48,000; Referee: Claus Bo Larsen (Denmark)

10 September 2008 2010 World Cup qualification	Lithuania	2–0	Austria	Marijampolė, Lithuania
20:30 UTC+3	Danilevičius 52', 58'	Report		Stadium: Sūduva Stadium; Attendance: 4,500; Referee: Paolo Tagliavento (Italy)

11 October 2008 2010 World Cup qualification	Faroe Islands	1–1	Austria	Tórshavn, Faroe Islands
16:00 UTC+1	Løkin 47'	Report	Stranzl 49'	Stadium: Tórsvøllur; Attendance: 1,800; Referee: Darko Ceferin (Slovenia)

15 October 2008 2010 World Cup qualification	Austria	1–3	Serbia	Vienna, Austria
20:30 UTC+2	Janko 80'	Report	Krasić 15'; Jovanović 18'; Obradović 24'	Stadium: Ernst-Happel Stadion; Attendance: 47,998; Referee: Mike Riley (England)

19 November 2008 Friendly	Austria	2–4	Turkey	Vienna, Austria
20:30	Hölzl 28', 53'	Report	Aurélio 38'; Şanlı 41', 47', 62'	Stadium: Ernst-Happel Stadion; Attendance: 23,100; Referee: Manuel Gräfe (Germany)

=== 2009 ===
11 February 2009 Friendly	Austria	0–2	Sweden	Graz, Austria
20:30		Report	Elm 57'; Källström 63'	Stadium: UPC-Arena; Attendance: 11,800; Referee: Viktor Kassai (Hungary)

1 April 2009 2010 World Cup qualification	Austria	2–1	Romania	Klagenfurt, Austria
20:30 UTC+2	Hoffer 26', 44'	Report	Tănase 24'	Stadium: Hypo-Arena; Attendance: 23,000; Referee: Craig Thomson (Scotland)

6 June 2009 2010 World Cup qualification	Serbia	1–0	Austria	Belgrade, Serbia
20:30 UTC+2	Milijaš 7' (pen.)	Report		Stadium: Stadion Crvena Zvezda; Attendance: 41,000; Referee: Pieter Vink (Netherlands)

12 August 2009 Friendly	Austria	0–2	Cameroon	Klagenfurt, Austria
20:30 UTC+2		Report	Webó 28', 35'	Stadium: Wörthersee Stadion; Attendance: 28,600; Referee: Pavel Olšiak (Slovakia)

5 September 2009 2010 World Cup qualification	Austria	3–1	Faroe Islands	Graz, Austria
20:30 UTC+2	Maierhofer 1'; Janko 15', 58' (pen.)	Report	A. Olsen 82'	Stadium: UPC-Arena; Attendance: 12,300; Referee: Marco Borg (Malta)

9 September 2009 2010 World Cup qualification	Romania	1–1	Austria	Bucharest, Romania
20:45 UTC+3	Bucur 54'	Report	Schiemer 83'	Stadium: Stadionul Steaua; Attendance: 7,505; Referee: Martin Atkinson (England)

10 October 2009 2010 World Cup qualification	Austria	2–1	Lithuania	Innsbruck, Austria
20:30 UTC+2	Janko 16'; Wallner 80' (pen.)	Report	Stankevičius 66'	Stadium: Tivoli Neu; Attendance: 14,200; Referee: Serge Gumienny (Belgium)

14 October 2009 2010 World Cup qualification	France	3–1	Austria	Saint-Denis, France
21:00 UTC+2	Benzema 18'; Henry 26' (pen.); Gignac 66'	Report	Janko 49'	Stadium: Stade de France; Attendance: 78,099; Referee: Pedro Proença (Portugal)

18 November 2009 Friendly	Austria	1–5	Spain	Vienna, Austria
20:45	Jantscher 7'	Report	Fàbregas 10'; Villa 20', 45'; Güiza 56'; P. Hernández 57'	Stadium: Ernst-Happel Stadion; Attendance: 32,000; Referee: Florian Meyer (Germany)

=== 2010 ===
3 March 2010 Friendly	Austria	2–1	Denmark	Vienna, Austria
20:30	Schiemer 12'; Wallner 37'	Report	Bendtner 16'	Stadium: Ernst-Happel Stadion; Attendance: 13,500; Referee: Pavel Královec (Czech Republic)

19 May 2010 Friendly	Austria	0–1	Croatia	Klagenfurt, Austria
20:30 (UTC+2)		Report	Bilić 86'	Stadium: Wörthersee Stadion; Attendance: 20,000; Referee: Kevin Blom (Netherlands)

11 August 2010 Friendly	Austria	0–1	Switzerland	Klagenfurt, Austria
20:30 (UTC+2)		Report	Costanzo 73'	Stadium: Wörthersee Stadion; Attendance: 18,000; Referee: Antonio Rubinos Pérez (Spain)

7 September 2010 Euro 2012 qualifying	Austria	2–0	Kazakhstan	Salzburg, Austria
20:30 UTC+2	Linz 90+1'; Hoffer 90+2'	Report		Stadium: Red Bull Arena; Attendance: 22,500; Referee: Marijo Strahonja (Croatia)

8 October 2010 Euro 2012 qualifying	Austria	3–0	Azerbaijan	Vienna, Austria
20:30 UTC+2	Prödl 3'; Arnautović 53', 90+2'	Report		Stadium: Ernst-Happel Stadion; Attendance: 26,500; Referee: Nicolai Vollquartz (Denmark)

12 October 2010 Euro 2012 qualifying	Belgium	4–4	Austria	Brussels, Belgium
20:45 UTC+2	Vossen 11'; Fellaini 47'; Ogunjimi 87'; Lombaerts 89'	Report	Schiemer 14', 62'; Arnautović 29'; Harnik 90+3'	Stadium: King Baudouin Stadium; Attendance: 24,231; Referee: Mike Dean (England)

17 November 2010 Friendly	Austria	1–2	Greece	Vienna, Austria
20:30	Fuchs 67'	Report	Samaras 49'; Fotakis 81'	Stadium: Ernst-Happel Stadion; Attendance: 16,200; Referee: Sascha Kever (Switzerland)

=== 2011 ===
9 February 2011 Friendly	Netherlands	3–1	Austria	Eindhoven, Netherlands
20:30	Sneijder 28'; Huntelaar 48'; Kuyt 71' (pen.)	Report	Arnautović 84' (pen.)	Stadium: Philips Stadion; Attendance: 33,000; Referee: Felix Brych (Germany)

25 March 2011 Euro 2012 qualifying	Austria	0–2	Belgium	Vienna, Austria
20:30 UTC+1		Report	Witsel 6', 50'	Stadium: Ernst-Happel Stadion; Attendance: 45,000; Referee: Vladislav Bezborodov (Russia)

29 March 2011 Euro 2012 qualifying	Turkey	2–0	Austria	Istanbul, Turkey
20:30 UTC+3	Arda 28'; Gökhan G. 78'	Report		Stadium: Şükrü Saracoğlu Stadium; Attendance: 40,420; Referee: Pavel Kralovec (Czech Republic)

3 June 2011 Euro 2012 qualifying	Austria	1–2	Germany	Vienna, Austria
20:35 UTC+2	Friedrich 50' (o.g.)	Report	Gómez 44', 90'	Stadium: Ernst-Happel Stadion; Attendance: 47,500; Referee: Massimo Busacca (Switzerland)

7 June 2011 Friendly	Austria	3–1	Latvia	Graz, Austria
20:30 (UTC+2)	Dibon 75'} Harnik 81', 90+6' (pen.)	Report	Mihadjuks 49'	Stadium: UPC-Arena; Attendance: 8,500; Referee: Simon Evans (Wales)

10 August 2011 Friendly	Austria	1–2	Slovakia	Klagenfurt, Austria
20:30 (UTC+2)	Hoffer 62'	Report	Kucka 21'; Jež 30'	Stadium: Wörthersee Stadion; Attendance: 13,000; Referee: Darko Čeferin (Slovenia)

2 September 2011 Euro 2012 qualifying	Germany	6–2	Austria	Gelsenkirchen, Germany
20:45 UTC+2	Klose 8'; Özil 23', 47'; Podolski 28'; Schürrle 83'; Götze 88'	Report	Arnautović 42'; Harnik 51'	Stadium: Arena AufSchalke; Attendance: 53,313; Referee: Paolo Tagliavento (Italy)

6 September 2011 Euro 2012 qualifying	Austria	0–0	Turkey	Vienna, Austria
20:30 UTC+2		Report		Stadium: Ernst-Happel Stadion; Attendance: 47,500; Referee: Alberto Undiano Mallenco (Spain)

7 October 2011 Euro 2012 qualifying	Azerbaijan	1–4	Austria	Baku, Azerbaijan
21:00 UTC+5	Nadirov 74'	Report	Ivanschitz 34'; Janko 52', 62'; Junuzović 90+1'	Stadium: Dalga Stadium; Attendance: 6,000; Referee: Stephan Studer (Switzerland)

11 October 2011 Euro 2012 qualifying	Kazakhstan	0–0	Austria	Astana, Kazakhstan
22:00 UTC+6		Report		Stadium: Astana Arena; Attendance: 11,000; Referee: Hannes Kaasik (Estonia)

15 November 2011 Friendly	Ukraine	2–1	Austria	Lviv, Ukraine
21:00 (UTC+2)	Milevskiy 18'; Dević 90+1'	Report	Janko 71'	Stadium: Arena Lviv; Attendance: 31,879; Referee: Svein Moen (Norway)

=== 2012 ===
29 February 2012 Friendly	Austria	3–1	Finland	Klagenfurt, Austria
20:30	Janko 32'; Harnik 54'; Ivanschitz 73'	Report	Furuholm 89'	Stadium: Wörthersee Stadion; Attendance: 10,200; Referee: Paolo Valeri (Italy)

1 June 2012 Friendly	Austria	3–2	Ukraine	Innsbruck, Austria
20:30 (UTC+2)	Junuzović 3'; Arnautović 62', 89'	Report	Husiev 56', 65'	Stadium: Tivoli Stadion Tirol; Attendance: 13,000; Referee: Felix Zwayer (Germany)

5 June 2012 Friendly	Austria	0–0	Romania	Innsbruck, Austria
20:30 (UTC+2)		Report		Stadium: Tivoli Stadion Tirol; Attendance: 12,500; Referee: Danny Makkelie (Netherlands)

15 August 2012 Friendly	Austria	2–0	Turkey	Vienna, Austria
20:30 (UTC+2)	Kavlak 2'; Ivanschitz 6' (pen.)	Report		Stadium: Ernst-Happel Stadion; Attendance: 23,500; Referee: Jan Valášek (Slovakia)

11 September 2012 2014 World Cup qualification	Austria	1–2	Germany	Vienna, Austria
20:35 UTC+2	Junuzović 57'	Report	Reus 44'; Özil 52' (pen.)	Stadium: Ernst-Happel-Stadion; Attendance: 47,000; Referee: Björn Kuipers (Netherlands)

12 October 2012 2014 World Cup qualification	Kazakhstan	0–0	Austria	Astana, Kazakhstan
22:00 UTC+6		Report		Stadium: Astana Arena; Attendance: 12,900; Referee: Tamás Bognar (Hungary)

16 October 2012 2014 World Cup qualification	Austria	4–0	Kazakhstan	Vienna, Austria
20:35 UTC+2	Janko 24', 63'; Alaba 71'; Harnik 90+3'	Report		Stadium: Ernst-Happel-Stadion; Attendance: 43,000; Referee: Jakob Kehlet (Denmark)

14 November 2012 Friendly	Austria	0–3	Ivory Coast	Linz, Austria
20:30		Report	Ya Konan 44'; Drogba 61'; L. Traoré 76'	Stadium: Linzer Stadion; Attendance: 13,832; Referee: Pavel Královec (Czech Republic)

=== 2013 ===
6 February 2013 Friendly	Wales	2–1	Austria	Swansea, Wales
19:45 (UTC+0)	Bale 21'; Vokes 52'	Report	Janko 75'	Stadium: Liberty Stadium; Attendance: 8,000; Referee: Menashe Masiah (Israel)

22 March 2013 2014 World Cup qualification	Austria	6–0	Faroe Islands	Vienna, Austria
20:30 UTC+1	Hosiner 8', 20'; Ivanschitz 28'; Junuzović 77'; Alaba 78'; Garics 82'	Report		Stadium: Ernst-Happel-Stadion; Attendance: 24,200; Referee: Oleksandr Derdo (Ukraine)

26 March 2013 2014 World Cup qualification	Republic of Ireland	2–2	Austria	Dublin, Ireland
19:45 UTC±0	Walters 25' (pen.), 45+1'	Report	Harnik 11'; Alaba 90+3'	Stadium: Aviva Stadium; Attendance: 35,100; Referee: Marijo Strahonja (Croatia)

7 June 2013 2014 World Cup qualification	Austria	2–1	Sweden	Vienna, Austria
20:30 UTC+2	Alaba 26' (pen.); Janko 32'	Report	Elmander 82'	Stadium: Ernst-Happel-Stadion; Attendance: 48,500; Referee: Gianluca Rocchi (Italy)

14 August 2013 Friendly	Austria	0–2	Greece	Wals-Siezenheim, Austria
20:45 (UTC+2)		Report	Mitroglou 39', 67'	Stadium: Red Bull Arena; Attendance: 23,400; Referee: Richard Trutz (Slovakia)

6 September 2013 2014 World Cup qualification	Germany	3–0	Austria	Munich, Germany
20:45 UTC+2	Klose 33'; Kroos 51'; Müller 88'	Report		Stadium: Allianz Arena; Attendance: 68,000; Referee: Milorad Mažić (Serbia)

10 September 2013 2014 World Cup qualification	Austria	1–0	Republic of Ireland	Vienna, Austria
20:45 UTC+2	Alaba 84'	Report		Stadium: Ernst-Happel-Stadion; Attendance: 48,500; Referee: Olegário Benquerença (Portugal)

11 October 2013 2014 World Cup qualification	Sweden	2–1	Austria	Solna, Sweden
20:45 UTC+2	Olsson 56'; Ibrahimović 86'	Report	Harnik 29'	Stadium: Friends Arena; Attendance: 49,416; Referee: Cüneyt Çakır (Turkey)

15 October 2013 2014 World Cup qualification	Faroe Islands	0–3	Austria	Tórshavn, Faroe Islands
19:45 UTC+1		Report	Ivanschitz 16'; Prödl 64'; Alaba 67' (pen.)	Stadium: Tórsvøllur; Attendance: 3,100; Referee: Liran Liany (Israel)

19 November 2013 Friendly	Austria	1–0	United States	Vienna, Austria
20:45	Janko 33'	Report		Stadium: Ernst-Happel Stadion; Attendance: 20,200; Referee: István Vad (Hungary)

=== 2014 ===
5 March 2014 Friendly	Austria	1–1	Uruguay	Klagenfurt, Austria
19:30	Janko 14'	Report	Pereira 66'	Stadium: Wörthersee Stadion; Attendance: 22,000; Referee: Deniz Aytekin (Germany)

30 May 2014 Friendly	Austria	1–1	Iceland	Innsbruck, Austria
20:30 (UTC+2)	Sabitzer 28'	Report	Sigþórsson 46'	Stadium: Tivoli Stadion Tirol; Attendance: 13,800; Referee: Matej Jug (Slovenia)

3 June 2014 Friendly	Czech Republic	1–2	Austria	Olomouc, Czech Republic
20:30 (UTC+2)	Hořava 42'	Report	Sabitzer 34'; Baumgartlinger 72'	Stadium: Andrův stadion Attendance: 10,653; Referee: Pol van Boekel (Netherlands)

8 September 2014 Euro 2016 qualifying	Austria	1–1	Sweden	Vienna, Austria
20:45 (20:45 UTC+2)	Alaba 7' (pen.)	Report	Zengin 12'	Stadium: Ernst-Happel-Stadion; Attendance: 48,500; Referee: Pavel Královec (Czech Republic)

9 October 2014 Euro 2016 qualifying	Moldova	1–2	Austria	Chișinău, Moldova
20:45 (21:45 UTC+3)	Dedov 27' (pen.)	Report	Alaba 12' (pen.); Janko 51'	Stadium: Zimbru Stadium; Attendance: 9,381; Referee: Jorge Sousa (Portugal)

12 October 2014 Euro 2016 qualifying	Austria	1–0	Montenegro	Vienna, Austria
18:00 (18:00 UTC+2)	Okotie 24'	Report		Stadium: Ernst-Happel-Stadion; Attendance: 44,200; Referee: Bas Nijhuis (Netherlands)

15 November 2014 Euro 2016 qualifying	Austria	1–0	Russia	Vienna, Austria
18:00 (18:00 UTC+1)	Okotie 73'	Report		Stadium: Ernst-Happel-Stadion; Attendance: 47,500; Referee: Martin Atkinson (England)

18 November 2014 Friendly	Austria	1–2	Brazil	Vienna, Austria
19:00	Dragović 75' (pen.)	Report	David Luiz 63'; Firmino 82'	Stadium: Ernst-Happel Stadion; Attendance: 48,500; Referee: William Collum (Scotland)

=== 2015 ===
27 March 2015 Euro 2016 qualifying	Liechtenstein	0–5	Austria	Vaduz, Liechtenstein
20:45 (20:45 UTC+1)		Report	Harnik 14'; Janko 16'; Alaba 59'; Junuzović 74'; Arnautović 90+3'	Stadium: Rheinpark Stadion; Attendance: 5,864; Referee: Felix Zwayer (Germany)

31 March 2015 Friendly	Austria	1–1	Bosnia and Herzegovina	Vienna, Austria
19:30 (UTC+2)	Janko 34'	Report	Hajrović 48'	Stadium: Ernst-Happel Stadion; Attendance: 48,500; Referee: Libor Kovařik (Czech Republic)

14 June 2015 Euro 2016 qualifying	Russia	0–1	Austria	Moscow, Russia
18:00 (19:00 UTC+3)		Report	Janko 33'	Stadium: Otkrytiye Arena; Attendance: 33,750; Referee: Milorad Mažić (Serbia)

5 September 2015 Euro 2016 qualifying	Austria	1–0	Moldova	Vienna, Austria
20:45 (20:45 UTC+2)	Junuzović 52'	Report		Stadium: Ernst-Happel-Stadion; Attendance: 48,500; Referee: Aleksandar Stavrev (Macedonia)

8 September 2015 Euro 2016 qualifying	Sweden	1–4	Austria	Solna, Sweden
20:45 (20:45 UTC+2)	Ibrahimović 90+1'	Report	Alaba 9' (pen.); Harnik 38', 88'; Janko 77'	Stadium: Friends Arena; Attendance: 48,355; Referee: Carlos Velasco Carballo (Spain)

9 October 2015 Euro 2016 qualifying	Montenegro	2–3	Austria	Podgorica, Montenegro
20:45 (20:45 UTC+2)	Vučinić 32'; Bećiraj 68'	Report	Janko 55'; Arnautović 81'; Sabitzer 90+2'	Stadium: Stadion pod Goricom; Attendance: 7,107; Referee: Daniele Orsato (Italy)

12 October 2015 Euro 2016 qualifying	Austria	3–0	Liechtenstein	Vienna, Austria
18:00 (18:00 UTC+2)	Arnautović 12'; Janko 54', 57'	Report		Stadium: Ernst-Happel-Stadion; Attendance: 48,500; Referee: Miroslav Zelinka (Czech Republic)

17 November 2015 Friendly	Austria	1–2	Switzerland	Vienna, Austria
20:45	Alaba 13'	Report	Seferović 9', 38'	Stadium: Ernst-Happel Stadion; Attendance: 27,600; Referee: Manuel Gräfe (Germany)

=== 2016 ===
26 March 2016 Friendly	Austria	2–1	Albania	Vienna, Austria
17:30	Janko 6'; Harnik 13'	Report	Lenjani 47'	Stadium: Ernst-Happel Stadion; Attendance: 28,600; Referee: Ivan Kružliak (Slovakia)

29 March 2016 Friendly	Austria	1–2	Turkey	Vienna, Austria
20:30 (UTC+2)	Junuzović 22'	Report	Çalhanoğlu 43'; Turan 56'	Stadium: Ernst-Happel Stadion; Attendance: 26,700; Referee: Paweł Gil (Poland)

31 May 2016 Friendly	Austria	2–1	Malta	Klagenfurt, Austria
20:30 (UTC+2)	Arnautović 4'; Schöpf 18'	Report	Alaba 87' (o.g.)	Stadium: Wörthersee Stadion; Attendance: 20,200; Referee: Mattias Gestranius (Finland)

4 June 2016 Friendly	Austria	0–2	Netherlands	Vienna, Austria
20:30 (UTC+2)		Report	Janssen 9'; Wijnaldum 66'	Stadium: Ernst-Happel Stadion; Attendance: 48,000; Referee: Alberto Undiano Mallenco (Spain)

14 June 2016 Euro 2016 Group F	Austria	0–2	Hungary	Bordeaux, France
18:00 (UTC+2)		Report	Szalai 62'; Stieber 87'	Stadium: Nouveau Stade de Bordeaux; Attendance: 34,424; Referee: Clément Turpin (France)

18 June 2016 Euro 2016 Group F	Portugal	0–0	Austria	Paris, France
21:00 (UTC+2)		Report		Stadium: Parc des Princes; Attendance: 44,291; Referee: Nicola Rizzoli (Italy)

22 June 2016 Euro 2016 Group F	Iceland	2–1	Austria	Saint-Denis, France
18:00 (UTC+2)	Böðvarsson 18'; Traustason 90+4'	Report	Schöpf 60'	Stadium: Stade de France; Attendance: 68,714; Referee: Szymon Marciniak (Poland)

5 September 2016 2018 World Cup qualification	Georgia	1–2	Austria	Tbilisi, Georgia
18:00 (20:00 UTC+4)	Ananidze 78'	Report (FIFA); Report (UEFA)	Hinteregger 16'; Janko 42'	Stadium: Boris Paichadze Dinamo Arena; Attendance: 28,500; Referee: Aleksei Kulbakov (Belarus)

6 October 2016 2018 World Cup qualification	Austria	2–2	Wales	Vienna, Austria
20:45 (20:45 UTC+2)	Arnautović 28', 48'	Report (FIFA); Report (UEFA)	Allen 22'; Wimmer 45+1' (o.g.)	Stadium: Ernst-Happel-Stadion; Attendance: 44,200; Referee: Cüneyt Çakır (Turkey)

9 October 2016 2018 World Cup qualification	Serbia	3–2	Austria	Belgrade, Serbia
20:45 (20:45 UTC+2)	A. Mitrović 6', 23'; Tadić 74'	Report (FIFA); Report (UEFA)	Sabitzer 16'; Janko 62'	Stadium: Red Star Stadium, Attendance: 14,200; Referee: Jonas Eriksson (Sweden)

12 November 2016 2018 World Cup qualification	Austria	0–1	Republic of Ireland	Vienna, Austria
18:00 (18:00 UTC+1)		Report (FIFA); Report (UEFA)	McClean 48'	Stadium: Ernst-Happel-Stadion; Attendance: 48,500; Referee: Sergei Karasev (Russia)

15 November 2016 Friendly	Austria	0–0	Slovakia	Vienna, Austria
20:45		Report		Stadium: Ernst-Happel Stadion; Attendance: 14,200; Referee: Kevin Blom (Netherlands)

=== 2017 ===
24 March 2017 2018 World Cup qualification	Austria	2–0	Moldova	Vienna, Austria
20:45 (20:45 UTC+1)	Arnautović 75'; Harnik 90'	Report (FIFA); Report (UEFA)		Stadium: Ernst-Happel-Stadion; Attendance: 21,000; Referee: István Vad (Hungary)

28 March 2017 Friendly	Austria	1–1	Finland	Innsbruck, Austria
20:45 (UTC+2)	Arnautović 62'	Report	Jensen 76'	Stadium: Tivoli Stadion Tirol; Attendance: 13,700; Referee: Miroslav Zelinka (Czech Republic)

11 June 2017 2018 World Cup qualification	Republic of Ireland	1–1	Austria	Dublin, Ireland
18:00 (17:00 UTC+1)	Walters 85'	Report (FIFA); Report (UEFA)	Hinteregger 31'	Stadium: Aviva Stadium; Attendance: 50,000; Referee: David Fernández Borbalán (Spain)

2 September 2017 2018 World Cup qualification	Wales	1–0	Austria	Cardiff, Wales
20:45 (19:45 UTC+1)	Woodburn 74'	Report (FIFA); Report (UEFA)		Stadium: Cardiff City Stadium; Attendance: 32,633; Referee: Ovidiu Hațegan (Romania)

5 September 2017 2018 World Cup qualification	Austria	1–1	Georgia	Vienna, Austria
20:45 (20:45 UTC+2)	Schaub 43'	Report (FIFA); Report (UEFA)	Gvilia 8'	Stadium: Ernst-Happel-Stadion; Attendance: 13,400; Referee: Orel Grinfeeld (Israel)

6 October 2017 2018 World Cup qualification	Austria	3–2	Serbia	Vienna, Austria
20:45 (20:45 UTC+2)	Burgstaller 25'; Arnautović 76'; Schaub 89'	Report (FIFA); Report (UEFA)	Milivojević 11'; Matić 83'	Stadium: Ernst-Happel-Stadion; Attendance: 42,400; Referee: Pavel Královec (Czech Republic)

9 October 2017 2018 World Cup qualification	Moldova	0–1	Austria	Chișinău, Moldova
20:45 (21:45 UTC+3)		Report (FIFA); Report (UEFA)	Schaub 69'	Stadium: Zimbru Stadium; Attendance: 5,542; Referee: Bart Vertenten (Belgium)

14 November 2017 Friendly	Austria	2–1	Uruguay	Vienna, Austria
20:45	Sabitzer 5'; Schaub 87'	Report	Cavani 10'	Stadium: Ernst-Happel-Stadion; Attendance: 11,700; Referee: Tamás Bognár (Hungary)

=== 2018 ===
23 March 2018 Friendly	Austria	3–0	Slovenia	Klagenfurt, Austria
19:45	Alaba 15'; Arnautović 36', 51'	Report		Stadium: Wörthersee Stadion; Attendance: 18,100; Referee: Stephan Klossner (Switzerland)

27 March 2018 Friendly	Luxembourg	0–4	Austria	Luxembourg City, Luxembourg
20:30 (UTC+2)		Report	Arnautović 4'; Grillitsch 39'; Gregoritsch 59'; Schaub 84'	Stadium: Stade Josy Barthel; Attendance: 2,000; Referee: Mattias Gestranius (Finland)

30 May 2018 Friendly	Austria	1–0	Russia	Innsbruck, Austria
20:45 (UTC+2)	Schöpf 28'	Report		Stadium: Tivoli Stadion Tirol; Attendance: 14,500; Referee: Bas Nijhuis (Netherlands)

2 June 2018 Friendly	Austria	2–1	Germany	Klagenfurt, Austria
19:40 (UTC+2)	Hinteregger 53'; Schöpf 69'	Report	Özil 11'	Stadium: Wörthersee Stadion; Attendance: 29,200; Referee: Pavel Královec (Czech Republic)

10 June 2018 Friendly	Austria	0–3	Brazil	Vienna, Austria
16:00 (UTC+2)		Report	Jesus 36'; Neymar 63'; Coutinho 69'	Stadium: Ernst-Happel Stadion; Attendance: 48,500; Referee: Viktor Kassai (Hungary)

6 September 2018 Friendly	Austria	2–0	Sweden	Vienna, Austria
20:45 (UTC+2)	Helander 11' (o.g.); Alaba 61'	Report		Stadium: Generali Arena; Attendance: 11,100; Referee: Paweł Gil (Poland)

11 September 2018 2018–19 Nations League	Bosnia and Herzegovina	1–0	Austria	Zenica, Bosnia and Herzegovina
20:45 (UTC+2)	Džeko 78'	Report		Stadium: Bilino Polje Stadium; Attendance: 9,100; Referee: Ruddy Buquet (France)

12 October 2018 2018–19 Nations League	Austria	1–0	Northern Ireland	Vienna, Austria
20:45 (UTC+2)	Arnautović 71'	Report		Stadium: Ernst-Happel-Stadion; Attendance: 22,300; Referee: Georgi Kabakov (Bulgaria)

16 October 2018 Friendly	Denmark	2–0	Austria	Herning, Denmark
20:45 (UTC+2)	Lerager 29'; Braithwaite 90+3'	Report		Stadium: MCH Arena; Attendance: 7,386; Referee: Ola Nilsen (Norway)

15 November 2018 2018–19 Nations League	Austria	0–0	Bosnia and Herzegovina	Vienna, Austria
20:45		Report		Stadium: Ernst-Happel-Stadion; Attendance: 37,200; Referee: Andrew Dallas (Scotland)

18 November 2018 2018–19 Nations League	Northern Ireland	1–2	Austria	Belfast, Northern Ireland
18:00 (UTC+0)	C. Evans 57'	Report	Schlager 49'; Lazaro 90+3'	Stadium: Windsor Park; Attendance: 17,895; Referee: Jonathan Lardot (Belgium)

=== 2019 ===
21 March 2019 Euro 2020 qualifying	Austria	0–1	Poland	Vienna, Austria
20:45		Report	Piątek 69'	Stadium: Ernst-Happel-Stadion; Attendance: 40,400; Referee: Anastasios Sidiropoulos (Greece)

24 March 2019 Euro 2020 qualifying	Israel	4–2	Austria	Haifa, Israel
18:00 (19:00 UTC+2)	Zahavi 34', 45', 55'; Dabbur 66'	Report	Arnautović 8', 75'	Stadium: Sammy Ofer Stadium; Attendance: 16,180; Referee: Yevhen Aranovskyi (Ukraine)

7 June 2019 Euro 2020 qualifying	Austria	1–0	Slovenia	Klagenfurt, Austria
20:45	Burgstaller 74'	Report		Stadium: Wörthersee Stadion; Attendance: 19,200; Referee: Aleksei Kulbakov (Belarus)

10 June 2019 Euro 2020 qualifying	North Macedonia	1–4	Austria	Skopje, North Macedonia
20:45	Hinteregger 18' (o.g.)	Report	Lazaro 39'; Arnautović 62' (pen.), 82'; Bejtulai 86' (o.g.)	Stadium: Toše Proeski Arena; Attendance: 10,501; Referee: Aleksei Eskov (Russia)

6 September 2019 Euro 2020 qualifying	Austria	6–0	Latvia	Wals-Siezenheim, Austria
20:45	Arnautović 7', 53' (pen.); Sabitzer 13'; Šteinbors 76' (o.g.); Laimer 80'; Gregoritsch 85'	Report		Stadium: Stadion Wals-Siezenheim; Attendance: 16,300; Referee: Robert Hennessy (Ireland)

9 September 2019 Euro 2020 qualifying	Poland	0–0	Austria	Warsaw, Poland
20:45		Report		Stadium: National Stadium; Attendance: 56,788; Referee: Viktor Kassai (Hungary)

10 October 2019 Euro 2020 qualifying	Austria	3–1	Israel	Vienna, Austria
20:45	Lazaro 41'; Hinteregger 56'; Sabitzer 88'	Report	Zahavi 34'	Stadium: Ernst-Happel-Stadion; Attendance: 26,200; Referee: Willie Collum (Scotland)

13 October 2019 Euro 2020 qualifying	Slovenia	0–1	Austria	Ljubljana, Slovenia
20:45		Report	Posch 21'	Stadium: Stožice Stadium; Attendance: 15,108; Referee: Cüneyt Çakır (Turkey)

16 November 2019 Euro 2020 qualifying	Austria	2–1	North Macedonia	Vienna, Austria
20:45	Alaba 7'; Lainer 48'	Report	Stojanovski 90+3'	Stadium: Ernst-Happel-Stadion; Attendance: 41,100; Referee: Michael Oliver (England)

19 November 2019 Euro 2020 qualifying	Latvia	1–0	Austria	Riga, Latvia
20:45	Ošs 65'	Report		Stadium: Daugava Stadium; Attendance: 2,781; Referee: Alejandro Hernández Hernández (Spain)
