= UEFA Euro 2004 qualifying Group 3 =

Football tournament qualification stage

Standings and results for Group 3 of the UEFA Euro 2004 qualifying tournament.

Group 3 consisted of Austria, Belarus, Czech Republic, Moldova and Netherlands. Group winners were Czech Republic, who finished 3 points clear of second-placed team Netherlands.

== Standings ==
Pos	Team	Pld	W	D	L	GF	GA	GD	Pts	Qualification	(Czech Republic)	(Netherlands)	(Austria)	(Moldova)	(Belarus)
1	Czech Republic	8	7	1	0	23	5	+18	22	Qualify for final tournament	—	3–1	4–0	5–0	2–0
2	Netherlands	8	6	1	1	20	6	+14	19	Advance to play-offs	1–1	—	3–1	5–0	3–0
3	Austria	8	3	0	5	12	14	−2	9		2–3	0–3	—	2–0	5–0
4	Moldova	8	2	0	6	5	19	−14	6		0–2	1–2	1–0	—	2–1
5	Belarus	8	1	0	7	4	20	−16	3		1–3	0–2	0–2	2–1	—

Source: UEFA
Rules for classification: Qualification tiebreakers

== Matches ==
7 September 2002
17:00 UTC+2

Austria	2–0	Moldova
Herzog 4' (pen.), 30' (pen.)	Report

Ernst-Happel-Stadion, Vienna
Attendance: 18,300
Referee: Stuart Dougal (Scotland)
7 September 2002
20:30 UTC+2

Netherlands	3–0	Belarus
Davids 35'; Kluivert 37'; Hasselbaink 73'	Report

Philips Stadion, Eindhoven
Attendance: 32,000
Referee: Graham Barber (England)

12 October 2002
16:30 UTC+3

Moldova	0–2	Czech Republic
	Report	Jankulovski 69' (pen.); Rosický 79'

Stadionul Republican, Chişinău
Attendance: 3,500
Referee: Leslie Irvine (Northern Ireland)
12 October 2002
18:30 UTC+3

Belarus	0–2	Austria
	Report	Schopp 58'; Akagündüz 88'

Dinamo Stadium, Minsk
Attendance: 15,082
Referee: Eric Poulat (France)

16 October 2002
16:30 UTC+2

Czech Republic	2–0	Belarus
Poborský 6'; Baroš 23'	Report

Na Stínadlech, Teplice
Attendance: 12,851
Referee: Helmut Fleischer (Germany)
16 October 2002
20:30 UTC+2

Austria	0–3	Netherlands
	Report	Seedorf 15'; Cocu 20'; Makaay 30'

Ernst-Happel-Stadion, Vienna
Attendance: 46,100
Referee: Pierluigi Collina (Italy)

29 March 2003
18:30 UTC+2

Belarus	2–1	Moldova
Kutuzov 43'; Gurenko 58'	Report	Cebotari 14'

Dinamo Stadium, Minsk
Attendance: 7,700
Referee: Johan Verbist (Belgium)
29 March 2003
20:30 UTC+1

Netherlands	1–1	Czech Republic
Van Nistelrooy 45'	Report	Koller 68'

De Kuip, Rotterdam
Attendance: 48,378
Referee: Kim Milton Nielsen (Denmark)

2 April 2003
21:00 UTC+3

Moldova	1–2	Netherlands
Boret 16'	Report	Van Nistelrooy 37'; Van Bommel 85'

Sheriff Stadium, Tiraspol
Attendance: 9,500
Referee: Alain Sars (France)
2 April 2003
20:30 UTC+2

Czech Republic	4–0	Austria
Nedvěd 18'; Koller 32', 62'; Jankulovski 56' (pen.)	Report

Toyota Arena, Prague
Attendance: 17,150
Referee: Antonio Jesús López Nieto (Spain)

7 June 2003
19:00 UTC+3

Moldova	1–0	Austria
Frunză 60'	Report

Sheriff Stadium, Tiraspol
Attendance: 3,864
Referee: Joaquim Paulo Paraty da Silva (Portugal)
7 June 2003
21:00 UTC+3

Belarus	0–2	Netherlands
	Report	Overmars 61'; Kluivert 68'

Dinamo Stadium, Minsk
Attendance: 19,309
Referee: Tom Henning Øvrebø (Norway)

11 June 2003
20:15 UTC+2

Czech Republic	5–0	Moldova
Šmicer 41'; Koller 73' (pen.); Štajner 82'; Lokvenc 88', 90'	Report

Andrův Stadion, Olomouc
Attendance: 12,097
Referee: Kristinn Jakobsson (Iceland)
11 June 2003
20:30 UTC+2

Austria	5–0	Belarus
Aufhauser 33'; Haas 47'; Kirchler 53'; Wallner 62'; Cerny 70'	Report

Tivoli Neu, Innsbruck
Attendance: 8,100
Referee: Peter Fröjdfeldt (Sweden)

6 September 2003
18:30 UTC+3

Belarus	1–3	Czech Republic
Bulyha 14'	Report	Nedvěd 37'; Baroš 54'; Šmicer 85'

Dinamo Stadium, Minsk
Attendance: 7,500
Referee: Mike McCurry (Scotland)
6 September 2003
20:30 UTC+2

Netherlands	3–1	Austria
Van der Vaart 29'; Kluivert 60'; Cocu 62'	Report	Pogatetz 32'

De Kuip, Rotterdam
Attendance: 45,000
Referee: Eric Poulat (France)

10 September 2003
19:00 UTC+3

Moldova	2–1	Belarus
Dadu 26'; Covalciuc 87'	Report	Vasilyuk 90' (pen.)

Sheriff Stadium, Tiraspol
Attendance: 5,500
Referee: Dejan Delević (Serbia and Montenegro)
10 September 2003
20:15 UTC+2

Czech Republic	3–1	Netherlands
Koller 14' (pen.); Poborský 37'; Baroš 90'	Report	Van der Vaart 60'

Toyota Arena, Prague
Attendance: 18,356
Referee: Lucílio Batista (Portugal)

11 October 2003
17:00 UTC+2

Austria	2–3	Czech Republic
Haas 49'; Ivanschitz 77'	Report	Jankulovski 26'; Vachoušek 78'; Koller 90'

Ernst-Happel-Stadion, Vienna
Attendance: 32,350
Referee: Georgios Kasnaferis (Greece)
11 October 2003
20:30 UTC+2

Netherlands	5–0	Moldova
Kluivert 43'; Sneijder 50'; Van Hooijdonk 73' (pen.); Van der Vaart 79'; Robben 88'	Report

Philips Stadion, Eindhoven
Attendance: 30,995
Referee: Željko Širić (Croatia)

== Goalscorers ==
There were 64 goals scored in 20 matches, for an average of 3.2 goals per match.

6 goals

- (Czech Republic) Jan Koller

4 goals

- (Netherlands) Patrick Kluivert

3 goals

- (Czech Republic) Milan Baroš
- (Czech Republic) Marek Jankulovski
- (Netherlands) Rafael van der Vaart

2 goals

- (Austria) Mario Haas
- (Austria) Andi Herzog
- (Czech Republic) Vratislav Lokvenc
- (Czech Republic) Pavel Nedvěd
- (Czech Republic) Karel Poborský
- (Czech Republic) Vladimír Šmicer
- (Netherlands) Phillip Cocu
- (Netherlands) Ruud van Nistelrooy

1 goal

- (Austria) Muhammet Akagündüz
- (Austria) René Aufhauser
- (Austria) Harald Cerny
- (Austria) Andreas Ivanschitz
- (Austria) Roland Kirchler
- (Austria) Emanuel Pogatetz
- (Austria) Markus Schopp
- (Austria) Roman Wallner
- (Belarus) Vital Bulyga
- (Belarus) Sergei Gurenko
- (Belarus) Vitali Kutuzov
- (Belarus) Raman Vasilyuk
- (Czech Republic) Tomáš Rosický
- (Czech Republic) Jiří Štajner
- (Czech Republic) Štěpán Vachoušek
- (Moldova) Vadim Boreț
- (Moldova) Boris Cebotari
- (Moldova) Serghei Covalciuc
- (Moldova) Sergiu Dadu
- (Moldova) Viorel Frunză
- (Netherlands) Edgar Davids
- (Netherlands) Jimmy Floyd Hasselbaink
- (Netherlands) Roy Makaay
- (Netherlands) Marc Overmars
- (Netherlands) Arjen Robben
- (Netherlands) Clarence Seedorf
- (Netherlands) Wesley Sneijder
- (Netherlands) Mark van Bommel
- (Netherlands) Pierre van Hooijdonk
