= Urdl =

Urdl is a surname. Notable people with the surname include:

- Christoph Urdl (born 1999), Austrian footballer
- Simone Urdl, Canadian film producer
