= 2006 FIFA World Cup qualification – UEFA Group 6 =

The 2006 FIFA World Cup qualification UEFA Group 6 was a UEFA qualifying group for the 2006 FIFA World Cup. The group comprised Austria, Azerbaijan, England, Northern Ireland, Poland and Wales.

The group was won by England, who qualified for the 2006 FIFA World Cup. The runners-up Poland also qualified as one of two best runners-up.

== Standings ==
Pos	Team	Pld	W	D	L	GF	GA	GD	Pts	Qualification	England national football team	Poland national football team	Austria national football team	Northern Ireland national football team	Wales national football team	Azerbaijan national football team
1	England	10	8	1	1	17	5	+12	25	Qualification to 2006 FIFA World Cup	—	2–1	1–0	4–0	2–0	2–0
2	Poland	10	8	0	2	27	9	+18	24	Qualification to 2006 FIFA World Cup	1–2	—	3–2	1–0	1–0	8–0
3	Austria	10	4	3	3	15	12	+3	15		2–2	1–3	—	2–0	1–0	2–0
4	Northern Ireland	10	2	3	5	10	18	−8	9		1–0	0–3	3–3	—	2–3	2–0
5	Wales	10	2	2	6	10	15	−5	8		0–1	2–3	0–2	2–2	—	2–0
6	Azerbaijan	10	0	3	7	1	21	−20	3		0–1	0–3	0–0	0–0	1–1	—

Rules for classification: Tiebreakers

== Matches ==
4 September 2004
15:00

Northern Ireland	0–3	Poland
	(Report)	Żurawski 4'; Włodarczyk 36'; Krzynówek 56'

Windsor Park, Belfast
Attendance: 12,487
Referee: Jan Wegereef (Netherlands)
4 September 2004
20:30

Austria	2–2	England
Kollmann 71'; Ivanschitz 72'	(Report)	Lampard 24'; Gerrard 65'

Ernst-Happel-Stadion, Vienna
Attendance: 48,000
Referee: Ľuboš Micheľ (Slovakia)
4 September 2004
21:00

Azerbaijan	1–1	Wales
Sadygov 55'	(Report)	Speed 47'

Tofiq Bahramov Republican Stadium, Baku
Attendance: 8,000
Referee: Edo Trivković (Croatia)

8 September 2004
20:00

Wales	2–2	Northern Ireland
Hartson 32'; Earnshaw 74'	(Report)	Whitley 10'; Healy 21'

Millennium Stadium, Cardiff
Attendance: 63,500
Referee: Domenico Messina (Italy)
8 September 2004
20:30

Poland	1–2	England
Żurawski 47'	(Report)	Defoe 36'; Głowacki 57' (o.g.)

Stadion Śląski, Chorzów
Attendance: 30,000
Referee: Stefano Farina (Italy)
8 September 2004
20:30

Austria	2–0	Azerbaijan
Stranzl 23'; Kollmann 44'	(Report)

Ernst-Happel-Stadion, Vienna
Attendance: 26,400
Referee: Lawrence Sammut (Malta)

9 October 2004
15:00

England	2–0	Wales
Lampard 4'; Beckham 76'	(Report)

Old Trafford, Manchester
Attendance: 65,224
Referee: Terje Hauge (Norway)
9 October 2004
20:30

Austria	1–3	Poland
Schopp 30'	(Report)	Kałużny 10'; Krzynówek 78'; Frankowski 90'

Ernst-Happel-Stadion, Vienna
Attendance: 46,100
Referee: Lucílio Batista (Portugal)
9 October 2004
21:30

Azerbaijan	0–0	Northern Ireland
	(Report)

Tofiq Bahramov Republican Stadium, Baku
Attendance: 6,460
Referee: Attila Hanacsek (Hungary)

13 October 2004
19:45

Northern Ireland	3–3	Austria
Healy 36'; Murdock 58'; Elliott 93'	(Report)	Schopp 14', 72'; Mayrleb 59'

Windsor Park, Belfast
Attendance: 11,810
Referee: Mark Shield (Australia)
13 October 2004
20:00

Wales	2–3	Poland
Earnshaw 56'; Hartson 90'	(Report)	Frankowski 72'; Żurawski 81'; Krzynówek 85'

Millennium Stadium, Cardiff
Attendance: 56,685
Referee: Alain Sars (France)
13 October 2004
21:30

Azerbaijan	0–1	England
	(Report)	Owen 22'

Tofiq Bahramov Republican Stadium, Baku
Attendance: 17,000
Referee: Alain Hamer (Luxembourg)

26 March 2005
15:00

Wales	0–2	Austria
	(Report)	Vastić 81'; Stranzl 85'

Millennium Stadium, Cardiff
Attendance: 47,760
Referee: Paul Allaerts (Belgium)
26 March 2005
15:00

England	4–0	Northern Ireland
J. Cole 47'; Owen 52', 54'; Lampard 62'	(Report)

Old Trafford, Manchester
Attendance: 62,239
Referee: Wolfgang Stark (Germany)
26 March 2005
18:00

Poland	8–0	Azerbaijan
Frankowski 12', 63', 66'; Hajiyev 16' (o.g.); Kosowski 40'; Krzynówek 72'; Saganowski 84', 90'	(Report)

Polish Army Stadium, Warsaw
Attendance: 9,000
Referee: Nicolai Vollquartz (Denmark)

30 March 2005
19:45

England	2–0	Azerbaijan
Gerrard 51'; Beckham 62'	(Report)

St James' Park, Newcastle upon Tyne
Attendance: 49,046
Referee: Paulo Costa (Portugal)
30 March 2005
20:00

Poland	1–0	Northern Ireland
Żurawski 87'	(Report)

Polish Army Stadium, Warsaw
Attendance: 13,515
Referee: Peter Fröjdfeldt (Sweden)
30 March 2005
20:30

Austria	1–0	Wales
Aufhauser 87'	(Report)

Ernst-Happel-Stadion, Vienna
Attendance: 29,500
Referee: Manuel Mejuto González (Spain)

4 June 2005
20:00

Azerbaijan	0–3	Poland
	(Report)	Frankowski 28'; Kłos 57'; Żurawski 81'

Tofiq Bahramov Republican Stadium, Baku
Attendance: 10,458
Referee: Alberto Undiano Mallenco (Spain)

3 September 2005
15:00

Northern Ireland	2–0	Azerbaijan
Elliott 60'; Feeney 84'	(Report)

Windsor Park, Belfast
Attendance: 12,000
Referee: Dejan Stanišić (Serbia and Montenegro)
3 September 2005
15:00

Wales	0–1	England
	(Report)	J. Cole 54'

Millennium Stadium, Cardiff
Attendance: 70,715
Referee: Valentin Ivanov (Russia)
3 September 2005
20:30

Poland	3–2	Austria
Smolarek 13'; Kosowski 22'; Żurawski 67'	(Report)	Linz 61', 80'

Stadion Śląski, Chorzów
Attendance: 40,000
Referee: Massimo De Santis (Italy)

7 September 2005
19:45

Northern Ireland	1–0	England
Healy 74'	(Report)

Windsor Park, Belfast
Attendance: 14,069
Referee: Massimo Busacca (Switzerland)
7 September 2005
20:30

Poland	1–0	Wales
Żurawski 54' (pen.)	(Report)

Polish Army Stadium, Warsaw
Attendance: 13,500
Referee: Claus Bo Larsen (Denmark)
7 September 2005
21:00

Azerbaijan	0–0	Austria
	(Report)

Tofiq Bahramov Republican Stadium, Baku
Attendance: 2,800
Referee: Johan Verbist (Belgium)

8 October 2005
14:00

Northern Ireland	2–3	Wales
Gillespie 47'; Davis 50'	(Report)	Davies 27'; Robinson 37'; Giggs 81'

Windsor Park, Belfast
Attendance: 13,451
Referee: Ruud Bossen (Netherlands)
8 October 2005
16:00

England	1–0	Austria
Lampard 24' (pen.)	(Report)

Old Trafford, Manchester
Attendance: 64,822
Referee: Luis Medina Cantalejo (Spain)

12 October 2005
19:45

Wales	2–0	Azerbaijan
Giggs 3', 51'	(Report)

Millennium Stadium, Cardiff
Attendance: 32,628
Referee: Martin Hansson (Sweden)
12 October 2005
19:45

England	2–1	Poland
Owen 44'; Lampard 81'	(Report)	Frankowski 45+1'

Old Trafford, Manchester
Attendance: 65,467
Referee: Kim Milton Nielsen (Denmark)
12 October 2005
20:30

Austria	2–0	Northern Ireland
Aufhauser 44', 90'	(Report)

Ernst-Happel-Stadion, Vienna
Attendance: 12,500
Referee: Athanassios Briakos (Greece)

== Goalscorers ==
There were 80 goals scored in 30 matches, for an average of 2.67 goals per match.

7 goals

- (Poland) Tomasz Frankowski
- (Poland) Maciej Żurawski

5 goals

- (England) Frank Lampard

4 goals

- (England) Michael Owen
- (Poland) Jacek Krzynówek

3 goals

- (Austria) René Aufhauser
- (Austria) Markus Schopp
- (Northern Ireland) David Healy
- (Wales) Ryan Giggs

2 goals

- (Austria) Roland Kollmann
- (Austria) Roland Linz
- (Austria) Martin Stranzl
- (England) David Beckham
- (England) Joe Cole
- (England) Steven Gerrard
- (Northern Ireland) Stuart Elliott
- (Poland) Kamil Kosowski
- (Poland) Marek Saganowski
- (Wales) Robert Earnshaw
- (Wales) John Hartson

1 goal

- (Austria) Andreas Ivanschitz
- (Austria) Christian Mayrleb
- (Austria) Ivica Vastić
- (Azerbaijan) Rəşad Sadıqov
- (England) Jermain Defoe
- (Northern Ireland) Steven Davis
- (Northern Ireland) Warren Feeney
- (Northern Ireland) Keith Gillespie
- (Northern Ireland) Colin Murdock
- (Northern Ireland) Jeff Whitley
- (Poland) Ebi Smolarek
- (Poland) Radosław Kałużny
- (Poland) Tomasz Kłos
- (Poland) Piotr Włodarczyk
- (Wales) Simon Davies
- (Wales) Carl Robinson
- (Wales) Gary Speed

1 own goal

- (Azerbaijan) Aftandil Hacıyev (against Poland)
- (Poland) Arkadiusz Głowacki (against England)
