= Harald Cerny =

Austrian footballer

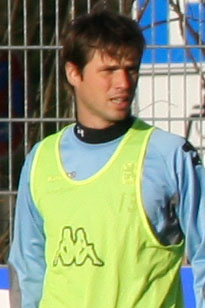
- Cerny with 1860 Munich in 2007

Personal information
- Date of birth: 13 September 1973 (age 53)
- Place of birth: Vienna, Austria
- Height: 1.77 m (5 ft 10 in)
- Position: Midfielder

Team information
- Current team: Bayern U16 (Head coach)

Youth career
- 1980–1984: ASV Hinterbrühl
- 1984–1990: Admira Wacker

Senior career*
| Years | Team | Apps | (Gls) |
| 1990–1992 | Bayern Munich (A) | 22 | (7) |
| 1992–1993 | Bayern Munich | 16 | (1) |
| 1993–1994 | Admira Wacker | 22 | (7) |
| 1994–1996 | FC Tirol | 52 | (14) |
| 1996–2007 | 1860 Munich | 213 | (15) |
| Total | | 303 | (37) |

International career
| 1993–2004 | Austria | 47 | (4) |

Managerial career
- 2007–2009: 1860 Munich U15
- 2009–2010: Bayern Munich U14
- 2010–2011: Bayern Munich U16
- 2011–2016: Bayern Munich youth
- 2018: Hannover 96 U17
- * Club domestic league appearances and goals

Harald Cerny (Austrian German: [ˈharald ˈtsɛrniː]; (Note: Standard Northern German pronunciation: [ˈhaʁalt ˈtsɛʁniː].) born 13 September 1973) is an Austrian former professional footballer who played as a right midfielder. He played mostly for TSV 1860 Munich.

== Club career ==
After coming through the youth ranks at Admira Wacker, Cerny began his professional career at German club FC Bayern Munich in 1992–93, making his top division debut on 27 October 1992, in a 1–1 draw at Eintracht Frankfurt.

Just after the start of the 1993–94 season (he appeared in three matches for the eventual champions), Cerny returned to Admira, where a good league season prompted a move to FC Tirol. During 1995–96, he returned to Munich, but with neighbours TSV 1860 Munich. In his eleven-year spell, Cerny appeared in 213 first division contests (a club record) scoring 15 goals, while helping it consolidate in the top flight and appear in the UEFA Cup.

He retired after the 2006–07 season, having played with the Bavarians in the second division his final three campaigns.

== International career ==
Cerny made his debut for Austria in a March 1993 friendly match against Greece. He earned 47 caps, scoring four goals.

His last international was an April 2004 friendly match against Luxembourg. He also played two matches at the 1998 FIFA World Cup in France, adding nine World Cup qualifiers.

== Coaching career ==
After retiring, he got the job as head coach of the U-15 of TSV 1860 Munich and was named as a replacement for Mehmet Scholl as head coach of the U-14 of FC Bayern Munich. After a short spell at U-17 coach of Hannover 96 Cerny is scouting for 1. FC Köln at the moment (2022).

== Personal life ==
Cerny is married and has two children.

== Career statistics ==
Appearances and goals by national team and year
| National team | Year | Apps | Goals |
|---|---|---|---|
| Austria | 1993 | 4 | 0 |
| Austria | 1994 | 6 | 0 |
| Austria | 1995 | 2 | 0 |
| Austria | 1996 | 1 | 0 |
| Austria | 1997 | 7 | 0 |
| Austria | 1998 | 8 | 3 |
| Austria | 1999 | 6 | 0 |
| Austria | 2000 | 4 | 0 |
| Austria | 2001 | 2 | 0 |
| Austria | 2002 | 4 | 0 |
| Austria | 2003 | 2 | 1 |
| Austria | 2004 | 1 | 0 |
| Total | | 47 | 4 |

Scores and results list Austria's goal tally first, score column indicates score after each Cerny goal.

List of international goals scored by Harald Cerny
| No. | Date | Venue | Opponent | Score | Result | Competition |
|---|---|---|---|---|---|---|
| 1 | 27 May 1998 | Ernst-Happel-Stadion, Vienna, Austria | Tunisia | 1–0 | 2–1 | Friendly |
| 2 | 10 October 1998 | Antonis Papadopoulos Stadium, Larnaca, Cyprus | Cyprus | 1–0 | 3–0 | UEFA Euro 2000 qualifying |
| 3 | 10 October 1998 | Antonis Papadopoulos Stadium, Larnaca, Cyprus | Cyprus | 2–0 | 3–0 | UEFA Euro 2000 qualifying |
| 4 | 11 June 2003 | Tivoli-Neu, Innsbruck, Austria | Belarus | 5–0 | 5–0 | UEFA Euro 2004 qualifying |
