= Tofiq Bahramov Republican Stadium =

Stadium in Baku, Azerbaijan

- Interactive map of Tofiq Bahramov Republican Stadium
- Full name: Tofiq Bəhramov adına Respublika Stadionu
- Former names: Joseph Stalin Stadium (1951–1956); Vladimir Lenin Stadium (1956–1993)
- Location: Baku, Azerbaijan
- Coordinates: 40°23′50″N 49°51′9″E
- Owner: AFFA
- Capacity: 31,090
- Surface: Grass
- Scoreboard: Yes
- Record attendance: 50,000 (Neftçi 3–1 Galatasaray, 11 July 1960); 45,000 (Neftçi 3–0 Spartak Moscow, 30 November 1966)
- Field size: 105 by 68 metres (115 by 74 yd)
- Public transit: Ganjlik

Construction
- Built: 1939–1951
- Opened: 16 September 1951
- Renovated: 2011–2012
- Expanded: 2011–2012

Tenants
- Neftçi (1951–2014); Qarabağ; Azerbaijan national football team

The Tofiq Bahramov Republican Stadium (Azerbaijani: Tofiq Bəhramov adına Respublika Stadionu) is a multi-purpose stadium in Baku, Azerbaijan. It is currently used mostly for football matches. It served as the home ground for the Azerbaijan national football team until they moved to the Baku Olympic Stadium. They returned for some UEFA Euro 2024 and 2026 FIFA World Cup qualifying matches. It holds 31,200 seats, making it the second largest stadium in the country. The stadium is also used by the Azerbaijan Premier League clubs in the final rounds of European competitions.

== History ==
The Tofiq Bahramov Republican Stadium was built in 1951. Its construction started before World War II in 1939, but was suspended. When its construction resumed, it was finished by German prisoners of war. Initially the stadium was named after Joseph Stalin (1878–1953) and built in the form of the letter C (Cyrillic: Cтaлин). After the 20th Congress of the Communist Party of the Soviet Union in 1956, it was renamed after Vladimir Lenin (1870–1924) as a part of de-Stalinization. In 1993, the stadium was named after the famous football referee Tofiq Bahramov (1925–1993) who died in the same year.

In 2011, the Presidential Reserve Fund of the State Budget of Azerbaijan for 2011 allocated $10 million for capital repairs and reconstruction of the stadium, as it could be used as a potential venue for the Eurovision Song Contest 2012. During the reconstruction process, the number of seats was increased from 29870 to 31200, and the grass-covered football stadium was properly renewed according to FIFA standards. In addition, the projectors that were used to light the stadium were also renewed with innovative and modern technologies. President Ilham Aliyev attended the opening of the Tofig Bahramov Republican Stadium after major overhaul and reconstruction on 16 August 2012.

The stadium was one of the venues for the group stages of the 2012 FIFA U-17 Women's World Cup. One Group A match, a semi-final, and the final were played there.

== Events ==
The athletics competitions of the European Youth Olympic Festival (EYOF) were held at the stadium between July 22 and 27, 2019.

The stadium also hosted archery at the 2015 European Games.

Aside from sporting uses, several concerts have been held at Tofiq Bahramov, with such big names as Shakira, Elton John, Jennifer Lopez and Tarkan playing.

=== Concerts ===
Concerts at the Tofiq Bahramov Stadium
Date	Artist	Tour	Attendance
30 June 2006	Tarkan	Solo Concert	55,000
10 June 2007	Aygun Kazimova	Solo Concert	29,000
23 September 2007	Elton John	The Captain and the Kid Tour	32,000
22 September 2012	Jennifer Lopez	2012 FIFA U-17 Women's World Cup	30,000
13 October 2012	Shakira	2012 FIFA U-17 Women's World Cup	40,000
19 April 2013	Konul Khasiyeva	Solo Concert	15,000

== Azerbaijan national football team matches ==
The following national team matches were held in the stadium.

Date	Time (CEST)	Team #1	Res.	Team #2	Round	Attendance
31 August 1996	20:00	Azerbaijan	1–0	Switzerland	1998 FIFA World Cup qualifying	15,000
10 November 1996	16:00	Azerbaijan	0–3	Hungary	1998 FIFA World Cup qualifying	30,000
2 April 1997	20:00	Azerbaijan	1–2	Finland	1998 FIFA World Cup qualifying	19,000
6 September 1997	20:00	Azerbaijan	0–1	Norway	1998 FIFA World Cup qualifying	8,000
10 October 1998	17:00	Azerbaijan	0–4	Hungary	UEFA Euro 2000 qualifying	7,500
31 March 1999	20:00	Azerbaijan	0–1	Romania	UEFA Euro 2000 qualifying	10,000
5 June 1999	18:00	Azerbaijan	4–0	Liechtenstein	UEFA Euro 2000 qualifying	8,500
4 September 1999	17:30	Azerbaijan	1–1	Portugal	UEFA Euro 2000 qualifying	8,000
9 October 1999	18:00	Azerbaijan	0–1	Slovakia	UEFA Euro 2000 qualifying	6,000
2 September 2000	20:45	Azerbaijan	0–1	Sweden	2002 FIFA World Cup qualifying	15,000
11 October 2000	20:00	Azerbaijan	0–1	Turkey	2002 FIFA World Cup qualifying	24,000
24 March 2001	16:00	Azerbaijan	0–0	Moldova	2002 FIFA World Cup qualifying	20,000
6 June 2001	19:00	Azerbaijan	2–0	Slovakia	2002 FIFA World Cup qualifying	10,000
7 September 2002	23:00	Azerbaijan	0–2	Italy	UEFA Euro 2004 qualifying	28,000
20 November 2002	19:00	Azerbaijan	0–2	Wales	UEFA Euro 2004 qualifying	9,500
4 September 2004	21:00	Azerbaijan	1–1	Wales	2006 FIFA World Cup qualifying	8,000
9 October 2004	21:30	Azerbaijan	0–0	Northern Ireland	2006 FIFA World Cup qualifying	6,460
13 October 2004	21:30	Azerbaijan	0–1	England	2006 FIFA World Cup qualifying	17,000
4 June 2005	20:00	Azerbaijan	0–3	Poland	2006 FIFA World Cup qualifying	10,458
7 September 2005	21:00	Azerbaijan	0–0	Austria	2006 FIFA World Cup qualifying	2,800
6 September 2006	19:00	Azerbaijan	1–1	Kazakhstan	UEFA Euro 2008 qualifying	8,500
28 March 2007	20:00	Azerbaijan	1–0	Finland	UEFA Euro 2008 qualifying	14,500
2 June 2007	20:00	Azerbaijan	1–3	Poland	UEFA Euro 2008 qualifying	25,800
13 October 2007	21:00	Azerbaijan	0–2	Portugal	UEFA Euro 2008 qualifying	29,300
17 October 2007	21:00	Azerbaijan	1–6	Serbia	UEFA Euro 2008 qualifying	3,100
21 November 2007	21:00	Azerbaijan	0–1	Belgium	UEFA Euro 2008 qualifying	7,000
10 September 2008	21:00	Azerbaijan	0–0	Liechtenstein	2010 FIFA World Cup qualifying	25,000
6 June 2009	20:00	Azerbaijan	0–1	Wales	2010 FIFA World Cup qualifying	26,728
12 August 2009	21:00	Azerbaijan	0–2	Germany	2010 FIFA World Cup qualifying	22,500
14 October 2009	21:00	Azerbaijan	1–1	Russia	2010 FIFA World Cup qualifying	17,000
12 October 2010	20:00	Azerbaijan	1–0	Turkey	UEFA Euro 2012 qualifying	29,500
7 June 2011	22:00	Azerbaijan	1–3	Germany	UEFA Euro 2012 qualifying	29,858
2 September 2011	21:00	Azerbaijan	1–1	Belgium	UEFA Euro 2012 qualifying	9,300
6 September 2011	20:00	Azerbaijan	3–2	Kazakhstan	UEFA Euro 2012 qualifying	9,112
7 September 2012	21:00	Azerbaijan	1–1	Israel	2014 FIFA World Cup qualifying	22,211
26 March 2013	21:00	Azerbaijan	0–2	Portugal	2014 FIFA World Cup qualifying	24,558
28 March 2015	18:00	Azerbaijan	2–0	Malta	UEFA Euro 2016 qualifying	14,600
26 March 2017	18:00	Azerbaijan	1–4	Germany	2018 FIFA World Cup qualifying	30,000
10 June 2017	18:00	Azerbaijan	0–1	Northern Ireland	2018 FIFA World Cup qualifying	27,978
16 October 2023	18:00	Azerbaijan	0–1	Austria	UEFA Euro 2024 qualifying	4,446
16 November 2023	15:00	Azerbaijan	3–0	Sweden	UEFA Euro 2024 qualifying	5,570
9 September 2025	18:00	Azerbaijan	1–1	Ukraine	2026 FIFA World Cup qualifying	8,450
16 November 2025	18:00	Azerbaijan	1–3	France	2026 FIFA World Cup qualifying	29,700

== Gallery ==
Panorama of the stadium.

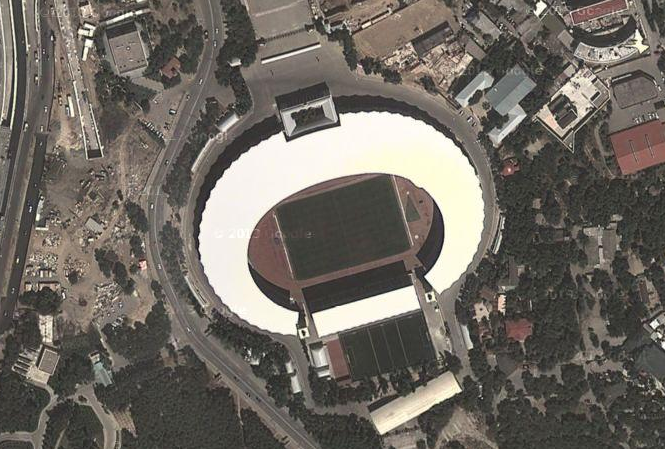
The view of the stadium from satellite.

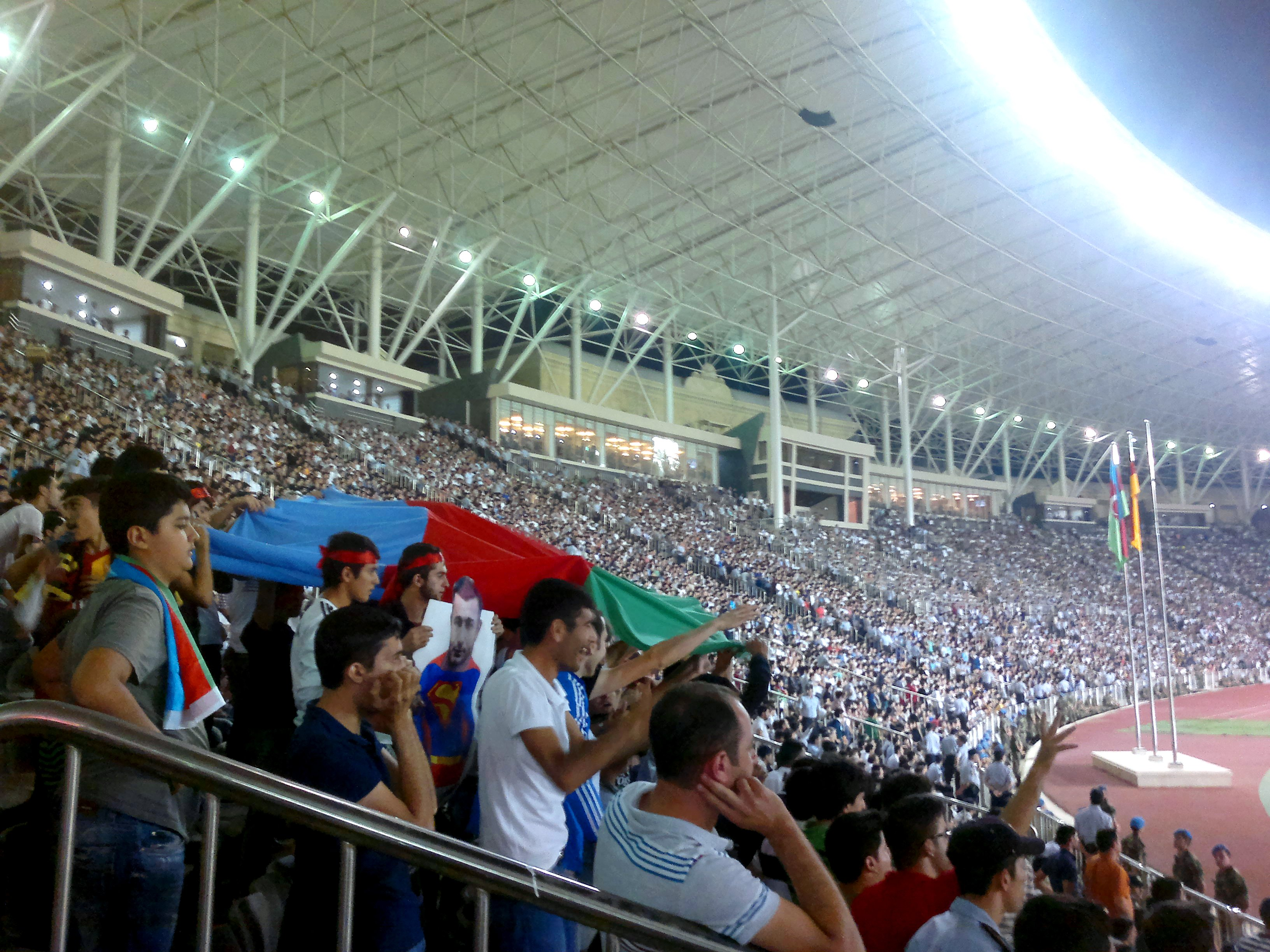
Qarabağ FK during the Europa League qualifier match.

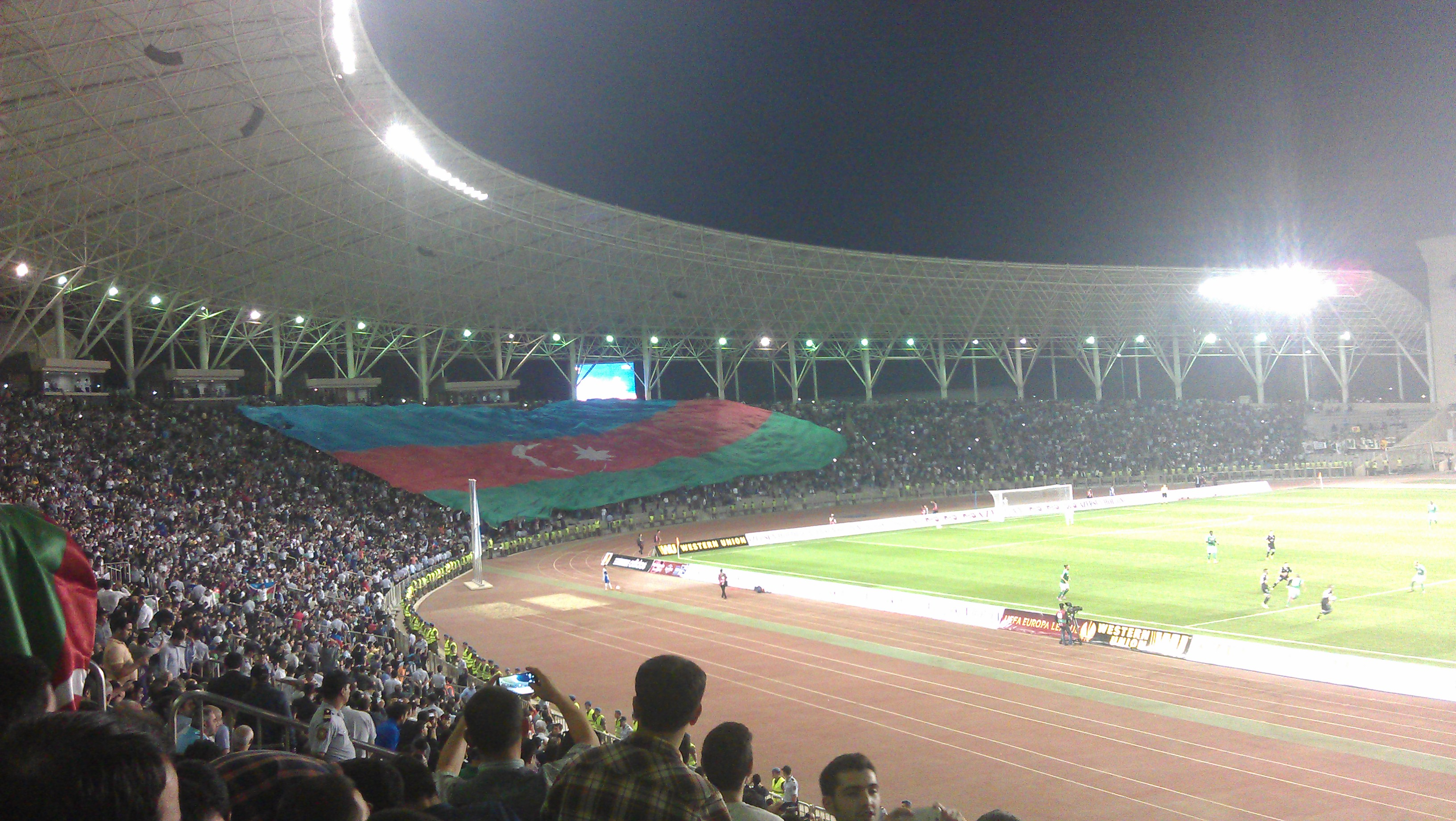
Flag of Azerbaijan tifo during the Europa League group match.

== See also ==
- List of football stadiums in Azerbaijan
- Baku Olympic Stadium
- Tofiq Bahramov

Preceded by Hasely Crawford Stadium; Port of Spain	FIFA U-17 Women's World Cup; Final Venue; 2012	Succeeded by Estadio Nacional de Costa Rica; San José
