= Roland Kirchler =

Austrian footballer

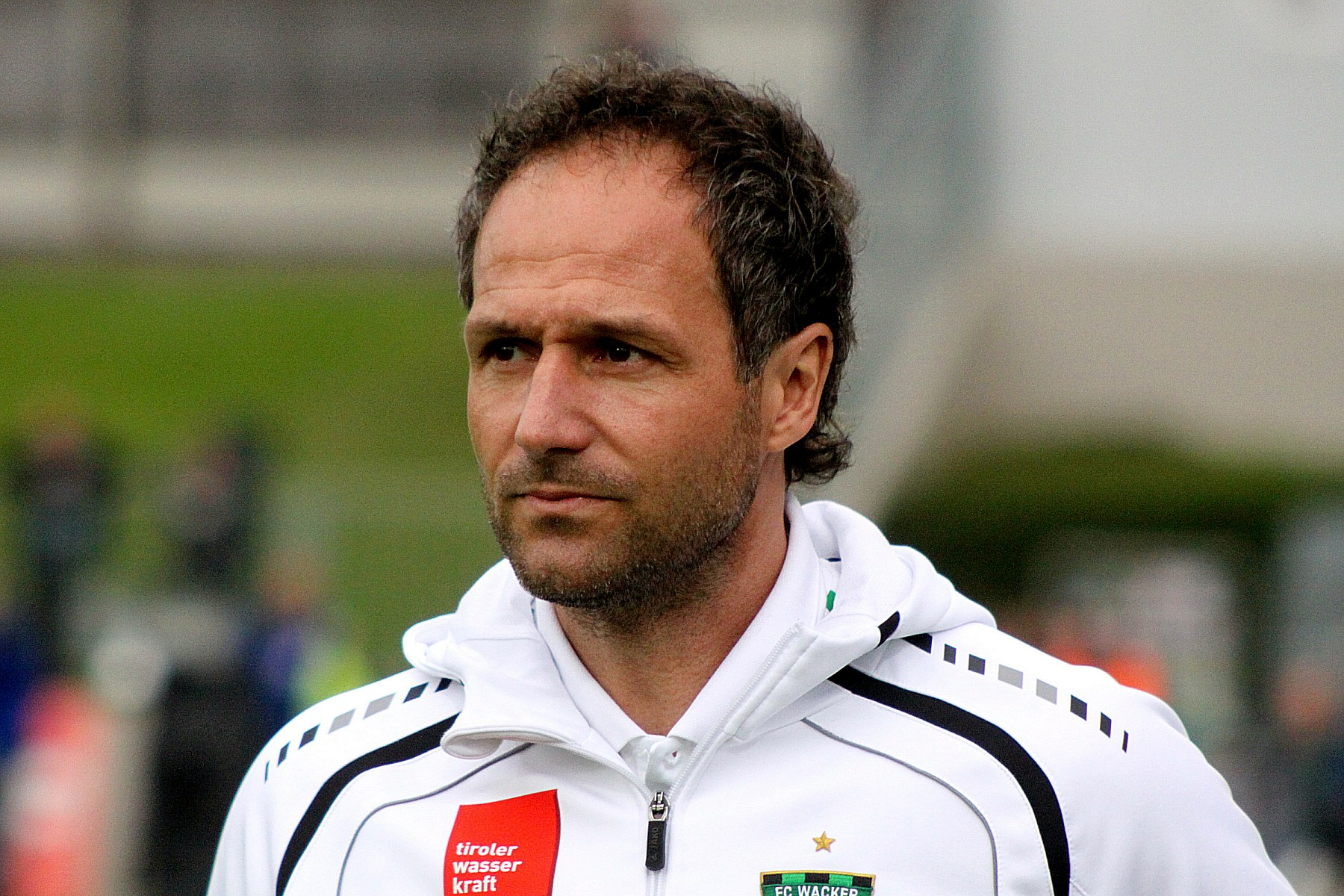
- Kirchler in 2013

Personal information
- Date of birth: 29 September 1970 (age 56)
- Place of birth: Vienna, Austria
- Height: 1.86 m (6 ft 1 in)
- Position: Midfielder

Senior career*
Years	Team	Apps	(Gls)
1989–1990	WSG Wattens		
1990–2002	FC Tirol Innsbruck	291	(57)
2002	Beijing Guoan	1	(0)
2002–2003	Austria Salzburg	29	(9)
2004–2005	SV Pasching	61	(12)
2005–2006	Red Bull Salzburg	31	(3)
2007–2008	SC Rheindorf Altach	43	(11)
2008–2012	WSG Wattens	40	(15)
Total		496	(107)

International career
1993–2005	Austria	28	(5)

Managerial career
- 2008–2012: WSG Wattens
- 2012–2013: FC Wacker Innsbruck
- * Club domestic league appearances and goals

Roland Kirchler (born 29 September 1970) is an Austrian former professional footballer who played as a midfielder.

== Club career ==
Born in Innsbruck, Kirchler played for FC Tirol Innsbruck from 1990 through 2002 and then at 32 decided to move abroad. But he returned to Austria after playing only one game in the Chinese league to sign for Salzburg. After one and a half season at Pasching he rejoined Salzburg before moving to SC Rheindorf Altach. In summer 2008 he joined his first club, WSG Wattens to finish his career where it took off in 1989.

== International career ==
Kirchler made his debut for Austria in a March 1993 friendly match against Greece but was overlooked for the 1998 FIFA World Cup and only became a regular after the tournament. He earned 28 caps, scoring 5 goals. His last international was a March 2005 World Cup qualification match against Wales.

== Career statistics ==
Appearances and goals by national team and year
National team	Year	Apps	Goals
Austria	1993	1	0
Austria	1994	0	0
Austria	1995	0	0
Austria	1996	1	0
Austria	1997	0	0
Austria	1998	0	0
Austria	1999	3	0
Austria	2000	7	1
Austria	2001	3	0
Austria	2002	0	0
Austria	2003	5	2
Austria	2004	5	1
Austria	2005	3	1
Total		28	5

Scores and results list Austria's goal tally first, score column indicates score after each Kirchler goal.

List of international goals scored by Roland Kirchler
No.	Date	Venue	Opponent	Score	Result	Competition	Ref.
1	16 August 2000	Ferenc Puskás Stadium, Budapest, Hungary	Hungary	1–1	1–1	Friendly	
2	30 April 2003	Hampden Park, Glasgow, Scotland	Scotland	1–0	2–0	Friendly	
3	11 June 2003	Tivoli Stadion Tirol, Innsbruck, Austria	Belarus	3–0	5–0	UEFA Euro 2004 qualifying	
4	28 April 2004	Tivoli Stadion Tirol, Innsbruck, Austria	Luxembourg	1–0	4–1	Friendly	
5	8 February 2005	Tsirio Stadium, Limassol, Cyprus	Cyprus	1–0	1–1	Friendly	

== Honours ==
FC Tirol Innsbruck

- Austrian Football Bundesliga: 2000, 2001, 2002
- Austrian Cup: 1993
