= Archery at the 2015 European Games – Qualification =

There were 128 qualifying places available for archery at the 2015 European Games: 64 for men and 64 for women.

== Qualification process ==
There shall be two qualification tournaments for archers for the European Games. The first will be held in Echmiadzin, Armenia during the European Archery Championships on 21–26 July 2014, the second during the first leg of the Grand Prix on 24–28 March 2015.

=== European Championships ===
At the European Championships the National Olympic Committees (NOCs) of the top 8 teams (other than Azerbaijan) in both men's and women's team events will earn three quota places. These teams will thus have three individuals in the relevant individual event, and one entry in the relevant team event, at the 2015 European Games.

16 individual quota places per gender will be allocated to the NOCs of the highest ranked archers from nations which have not qualified through the team competition, with a maximum of one quota place per NOC.

=== Grand Prix ===
At the Grand Prix, the NOCs of the top 4 teams per gender will obtain 3 quota places, again insuring three entries in the relevant individual event, and one entry in the relevant team event at the 2015 European Games. The Grand Prix will be open to all NOCs that did not qualify a team through the European Championships. If any of the NOCs that qualified 3 quota places through the GP team event have already obtained 1 quota place for the individual competition at the European Championships, this individual quota place will be relinquished, and added to the list of available quota places at the Final Individual Qualifying Tournament.

6 further individual quota places will be allocated to the NOCs of the best ranked archers per gender. The Grand Prix will be open to all NOCs that have not obtained a quota place per gender through the other qualification event. Each NOC can obtain up to 1 quota place per gender. Extra quota places will be awarded if relinquished from NOCs winning a team place at the Grand Prix.

=== Mixed gender event ===
No specific qualification event will take place for the mixed gender event. Any NOC that has a minimum of 1 male and 1 female athlete qualified is eligible to compete in the mixed team event in Baku. However, only the top 15 teams (not including the host country) from the ranking round during the European Games, plus the team of the host country, will compete in the mixed gender event match play.

== Qualification timeline ==
Event	Date	Venue
2014 European Archery Championships	21–26 July 2014	(Armenia) Echmiadzin
2015 European Archery Grand Prix – 1st leg	24–28 March 2015	(Greece) Marathon

== Qualification summary ==
Nation	Men		Women		Mixed	Total
Nation	Men's individual	Men's team	Women's individual	Women's team	Mixed team	Athletes
Austria	1		1		X	2
Azerbaijan	3	X	3	X	X	6
Belarus	3	X	3	X	X	6
Belgium	1					1
Bulgaria	1		1		X	2
Croatia	1					1
Cyprus	1		1		X	2
Denmark	1		3	X	X	4
Estonia	1		1		X	2
Finland	1		1		X	2
France	3	X	3	X	X	6
Georgia	1		3	X	X	4
Germany	3	X	3	X	X	6
Great Britain	1		3	X	X	4
Greece	1		3	X	X	4
Iceland	1					1
Ireland	1		1		X	2
Israel	1					1
Italy	3	X	3	X	X	6
Kosovo	1		1		X	2
Latvia	1		1		X	2
Liechtenstein	1					1
Lithuania			1			1
Luxembourg	1					1
Moldova	1		1		X	2
Netherlands	3	X	3	X	X	6
Norway	3	X	1		X	4
Poland	3	X	3	X	X	6
Romania	1		1		X	2
Russia	3	X	3	X	X	6
San Marino	1					1
Serbia	1					1
Slovakia	1		1		X	2
Slovenia	3	X	1		X	4
Spain	3	X	3	X	X	6
Sweden	1		~~1~~			1
Switzerland	1		3	X	X	4
Turkey	3	X	3	X	X	6
Ukraine	3	X	3	X	X	6
Total: 39 NOCs	64	13	62	16	29	126

== Men ==
Event	Athletes per NOC	Total Places	Qualified
Host Nation	3	3	Azerbaijan
2014 European Championships, team event	3	24	Belarus; France; Germany; Norway; Russia; Slovenia; Spain; Ukraine
2014 European Championships, individual event	1	12	Belgium; Cyprus; Denmark; Finland; Georgia; Great Britain; Greece; Luxembourg; Moldova; Romania; Sweden; Switzerland
2015 European Grand Prix, team event	3	12	Italy; Netherlands; Poland; Turkey
2015 European Grand Prix, individual event	1	~~10~~ 9	~~Armenia~~; Austria; Bulgaria; Croatia; Estonia; Ireland; Israel; Latvia; San Marino; Slovakia
EOC Universality Places	1	3	Iceland; Kosovo; Serbia
Reallocation	1	1	Liechtenstein
TOTAL		64	

== Women ==
Event	Athletes per NOC	Total Places	Qualified
Host Nation	3	3	Azerbaijan
2014 European Championships, team event	3	24	Denmark; France; Georgia; Germany; Great Britain; Italy; Poland; Russia
2014 European Championships, individual event	1	~~9~~ 7	~~Armenia~~; Austria; Estonia; Finland; Moldova; Romania; Slovakia; Slovenia; ~~Sweden~~
2015 European Grand Prix, team event	3	12	Belarus; Netherlands; Spain; Ukraine
2015 European Grand Prix, team event (additional teams)	3	9	Greece; Switzerland; Turkey
2015 European Grand Prix, individual event	1	6	Bulgaria; Cyprus; Ireland; Kosovo; Latvia; Norway
EOC Universality Places	1	1	Lithuania
TOTAL		62	
