= Markus Schopp =

Association Football Manager

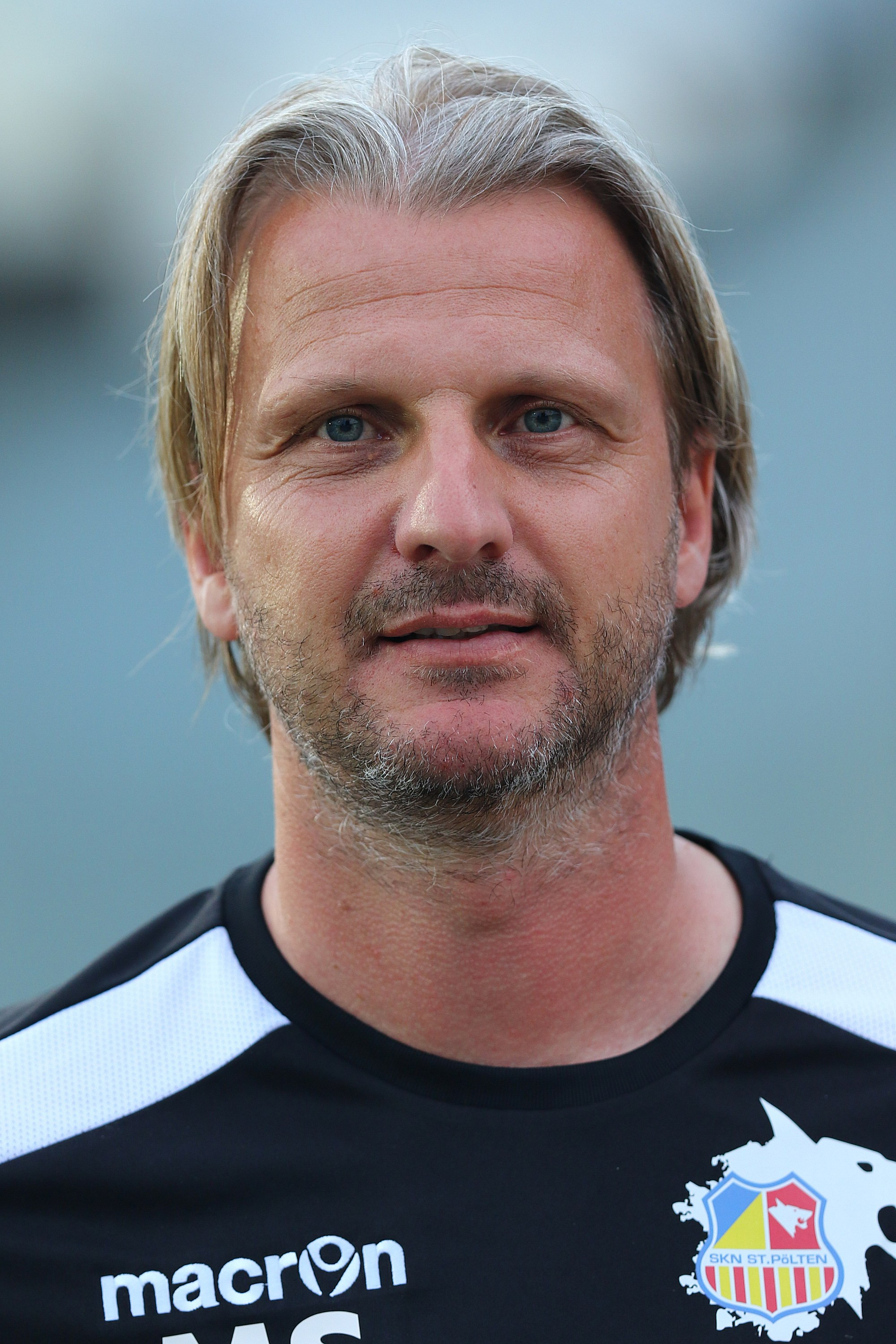
- Schopp in 2018

Personal information
- Date of birth: 22 February 1974 (age 52)
- Place of birth: Graz, Austria
- Height: 1.88 m (6 ft 2 in)
- Position: Midfielder

Team information
- Current team: TSV Hartberg (manager)

Senior career*
Years	Team	Apps	(Gls)
1991–1996	Sturm Graz	102	(10)
1996–1998	Hamburger SV	40	(3)
1998–2001	Sturm Graz	101	(20)
2001–2005	Brescia	80	(3)
2005–2006	Red Bull Salzburg	31	(6)
2006–2007	New York Red Bulls	10	(0)
Total		364	(42)

International career
1995–2005	Austria	56	(6)

Managerial career
- 2012–2013: Sturm Graz II
- 2013: Sturm Graz (caretaker)
- 2013–2017: Sturm Graz II
- 2017–2018: St. Pölten (assistant/analyst)
- 2018–2021: TSV Hartberg
- 2021: Barnsley
- 2022–2024: TSV Hartberg
- 2024–2025: LASK
- 2026–: TSV Hartberg
- * Club domestic league appearances and goals

Markus Schopp (born 22 February 1974) is an Austrian football coach and former player who played as a midfielder. He is the manager of Austrian Football Bundesliga club TSV Hartberg.

== Club career ==
Schopp played for Sturm Graz and Red Bull Salzburg in his native Austria. With Sturm Graz, he won the Austrian Bundesliga in 1998–99. He also had stints with Hamburger SV in Germany and alongside Roberto Baggio and Pep Guardiola at Brescia in Italy.

He retired from football in December 2007 due to chronic back problems after a loan spell with the New York Red Bulls of Major League Soccer.

== International career ==
Schopp made his debut for the Austria national team in an August 1995 European Championship qualifying match against Latvia and was a participant at the 1998 FIFA World Cup. He earned 56 caps, scoring 6 goals. His final international was an October 2005 World Cup qualifying match against Northern Ireland.

=== International goal ===
Scores and results list Austria's goal tally first.

#	Date	Venue	Opponent	Score	Result	Competition
1.	15 November 1995	Windsor Park, Belfast	Northern Ireland	1–3	3–5	UEFA Euro 1996 qualification
2.	12 October 2002	Dinamo Stadium, Minsk	Belarus	1–0	2–0	UEFA Euro 2004 qualification
3.	26 March 2003	Merkur-Arena, Graz	Greece	1–2	2–2	Friendly
4.	9 October 2004	Ernst-Happel-Stadion, Vienna	Poland	1–1	1–3	2006 FIFA World Cup qualification
5.	12 October 2004	Windsor Park, Belfast	Northern Ireland	1–0	3–3	2006 FIFA World Cup qualification
6.	12 October 2004	Windsor Park, Belfast	Northern Ireland	2–3	3–3	2006 FIFA World Cup qualification

== Managerial career ==
Schopp began his coaching career in the youth system of Red Bull Salzburg following his retirement.

In April 2013, he was named the interim head coach at his former club Sturm Graz until the end of the season, following the sacking of Peter Hyballa.

In 2018, Schopp became the manager of TSV Hartberg in the Austrian Bundesliga. In the 2019–20 season, Schopp led the club to their highest ever finish in the Austrian Bundesliga and secured a place in the UEFA Europa League for the first time in club history. During the 2020–21 season, he steered the club to a seventh-placed finish. During his time as a manager at Sturm Graz and Hartberg, Schopp built a reputation as a developer of young, emerging talent.

On 29 June 2021, Schopp was appointed head coach of Championship club Barnsley. He signed a three-year deal and replaced Valérien Ismaël, who had left the club a week prior to become the new manager at West Bromwich Albion. On 1 November 2021, Barnsley confirmed the sacking of Schopp after a poor run of form, a run of 13 games without a win and seven straight league defeats.

In December 2022, Schopp returned to TSV Hartberg. In September 2024, he became the head coach and sporting director of LASK. He was sacked by LASK in April 2025.

In May 2026, Schopp returned to TSV Hartberg once more.

== Personal life ==
Schopp is the uncle of the footballer Christoph Urdl, who played under him at Hartberg.

== Career statistics ==
=== International ===
Appearances and goals by national team and year
National team	Year	Apps	Goals
Austria	1995	4	1
Austria	1996	6	0
Austria	1997	4	0
Austria	1998	5	0
Austria	1999	3	0
Austria	2000	6	0
Austria	2001	6	0
Austria	2002	4	1
Austria	2003	7	1
Austria	2004	7	3
Austria	2005	4	0
Total		56	6

== Managerial statistics ==
As of match played 10 August 2025

Managerial record by team and tenure
Team	From	To	Record				
Team	From	To	G	W	D	L	Win %
Sturm Graz II	12 April 2012	21 April 2013	26	9	5	12	34.62
Sturm Graz (caretaker)	22 April 2013	3 June 2013	6	1	0	5	16.67
Sturm Graz II	14 June 2013	30 June 2017	120	42	37	41	35.00
TSV Hartberg	7 June 2018	29 June 2021	108	40	24	44	37.04
Barnsley	29 June 2021	1 November 2021	16	1	6	9	6.25
TSV Hartberg	2 December 2022	2 September 2024	58	22	14	22	37.93
LASK	3 September 2024	21 April 2025	43	21	10	12	48.84
Total			377	136	96	145	36.07

== Honours ==
Sturm Graz

- Austrian Bundesliga: 1998–99
