= Christoph Urdl =

Austrian footballer (born 1999)

Personal information
- Date of birth: 17 August 1999 (age 27)
- Place of birth: Austria
- Height: 1.81 m (5 ft 11 in)
- Position: Winger

Team information
- Current team: SC Kalsdorf
- Number: 17

Youth career
- 2004–2007: SV Union Liebenau
- 2007–2016: Sturm Graz

Senior career*
Years	Team	Apps	(Gls)
2016–2020	Sturm Graz II	41	(5)
2020–2023	Deutschlandsberger SC	73	(33)
2023–2025	TSV Hartberg	10	(1)
2024–2025	→ ASK Voitsberg (loan)	22	(2)
2025–	SC Kalsdorf	28	(6)
- * Club domestic league appearances and goals as of 26 June 2026

Christoph Urdl (born 17 August 1999) is an Austrian professional footballer who plays as a winger for SC Kalsdorf.

== Career ==
Urdl is a youth product of SV Union Liebenau, before moving to the academy of Sturm Graz in 2007. He worked his way up their youth academy, before debuting for their reserves in 2016. In 2020 after 13 years at Sturm Graz, he moved to Deutschlandsberger SC in the Austrian Regionalliga. After 3 prolific seasons with Deutschlandsberger, he attended a training camp for the Austrian Football Bundesliga club Hartberg. He formally signed with them on 9 July 2023, on a professional contract until 2025. He made his professional debut with Hartberg as a substitute in a 2–2 league tie with SC Austria Lustenau on 29 July 2023.

== Personal life ==
Urdl is the nephew of the Austrian football manager and former footballer Markus Schopp, who manages him at Hartberg. Outside of football, he is studying to become a teacher for sports and history.
