= Martin Stranzl =

Austrian footballer

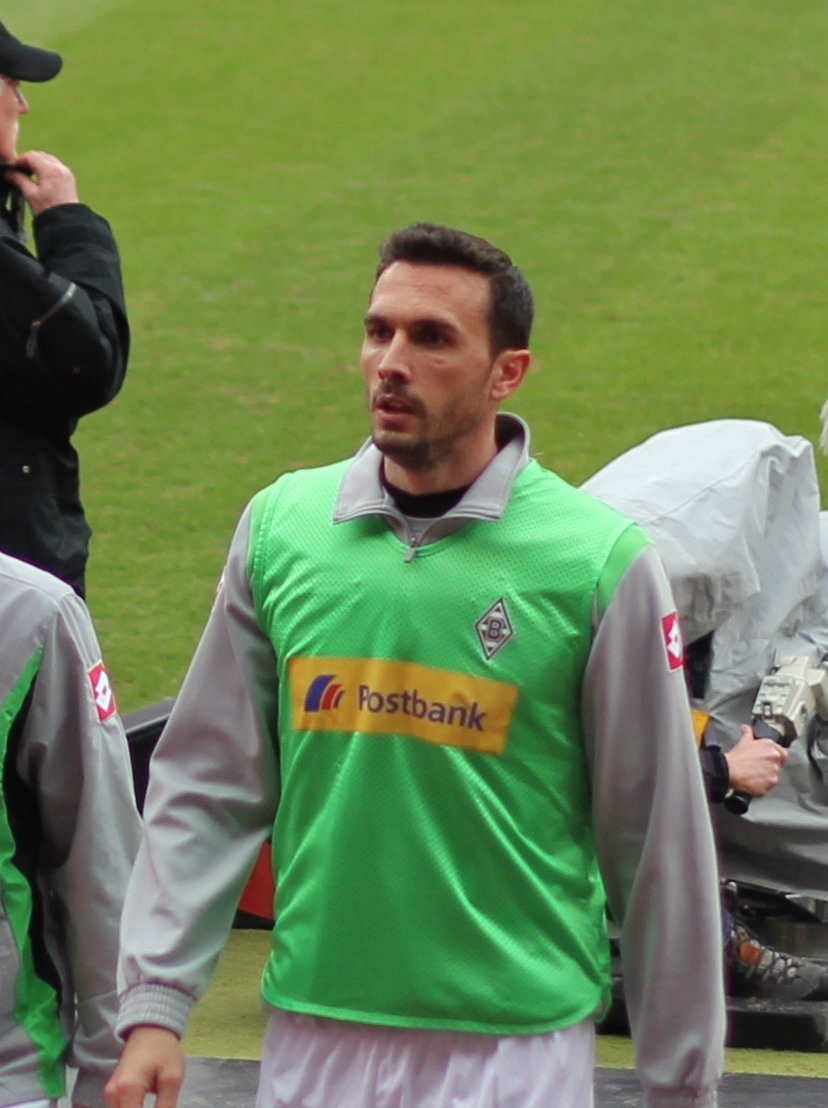
- Stranzl warming up in 2012

Personal information
- Date of birth: 16 June 1980 (age 46)
- Place of birth: Güssing, Austria
- Height: 1.91 m (6 ft 3 in)
- Position: Defender

Youth career
- 1986–1997: SV Güssing

Senior career*
Years	Team	Apps	(Gls)
1997–2004	1860 Munich	96	(4)
2004–2006	VfB Stuttgart	44	(1)
2006–2010	Spartak Moscow	95	(3)
2011–2016	Borussia Mönchengladbach	116	(8)
Total		351	(16)

International career
2000–2009	Austria	56	(3)

Managerial career
- 2016–2017: FC Büderich (youth)
- 2017–2018: Borussia Mönchengladbach (U19 assistant manager)
- 2018–2021: SV Güssing (youth)
- 2020: Israel (individual coach)
- 2023–: Grazer AK (U16 manager)
- * Club domestic league appearances and goals

Martin Stranzl (born 16 June 1980) is an Austrian professional football coach and a former player who played as a defender. He played for German clubs 1860 Munich, Stuttgart and Borussia Mönchengladbach, as well as Russian club Spartak Moscow during his career, and also represented the Austria national football team at UEFA Euro 2008.

== Club career ==
Born in Güssing, Stranzl played for SV Güssing as a youth. In 1997, he earned a transfer to TSV 1860 Munich, where he completed his youth training and debuted as a Bundesliga professional. In 2004, following TSV's relegation, the defender joined first-division team VfB Stuttgart, where he remained a cornerstone.

In March 2006, Stranzl signed for Russian Premier League side Spartak Moscow. With Spartak Moscow, he finished three times as runner-up in the Russian Premier League.

On 30 December 2010, Stranzl agreed to terms with Borussia Mönchengladbach on a 2 1/2-year deal. He helped the side avoid relegation. At the time of his signing, Borussia Mönchengladbach was last in the Bundesliga.

On 8 March 2016, he announced that he would retire in summer 2016.

== International career ==
He made his debut for Austria in a March 2000 friendly match against Sweden and was named in the Austrian squad for UEFA Euro 2008.

== Career statistics ==
Appearances and goals by national team and year
National team	Year	Apps	Goals
Austria	2000	6	0
Austria	2001	2	0
Austria	2002	1	0
Austria	2003	6	0
Austria	2004	7	1
Austria	2005	7	1
Austria	2006	6	0
Austria	2007	7	0
Austria	2008	12	1
Austria	2009	2	0
Total		56	3
