= René Aufhauser =

Austrian football player and coach

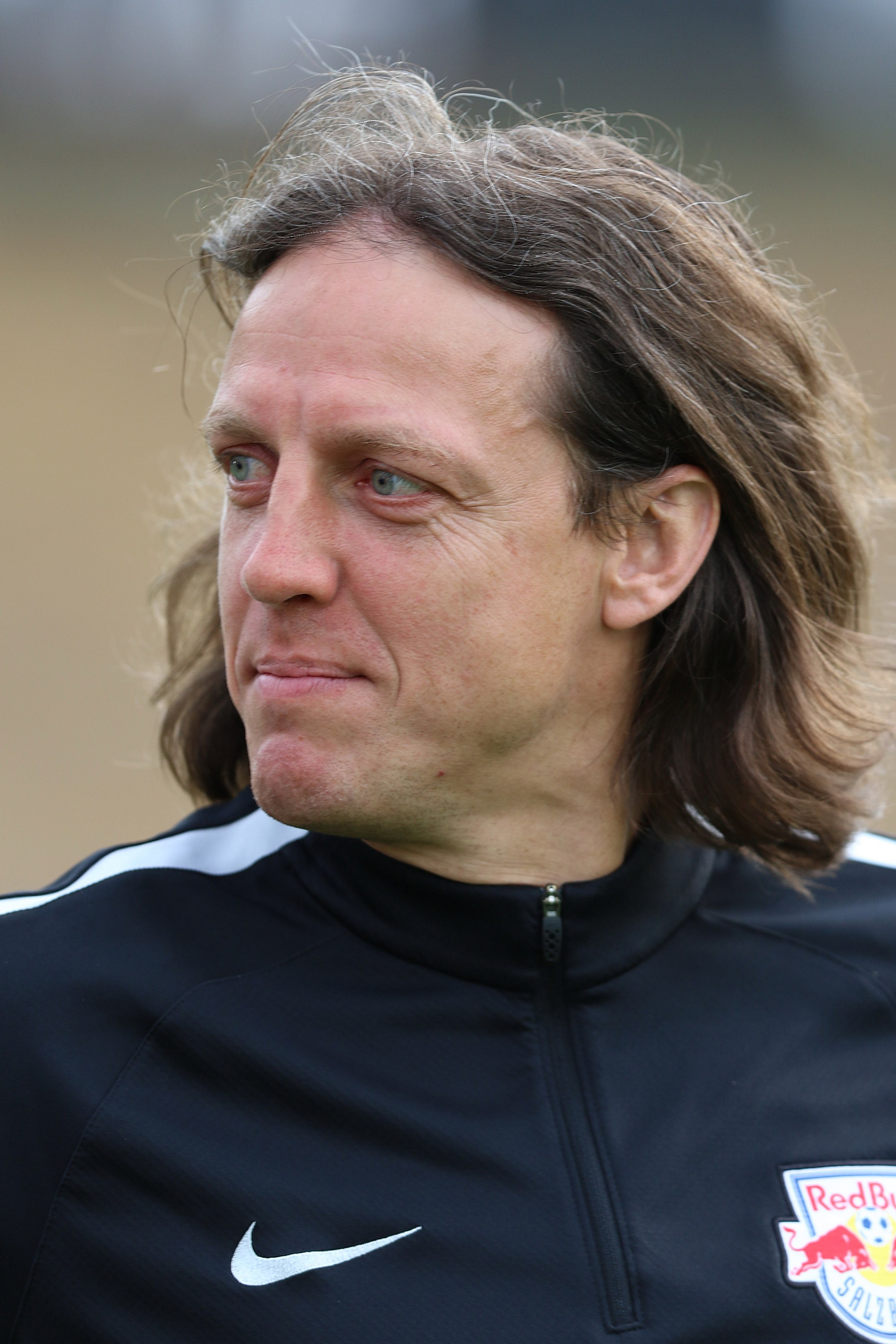

Personal information
- Full name: René Aufhauser
- Date of birth: 21 June 1976 (age 50)
- Place of birth: Voitsberg, Austria
- Height: 1.85 m (6 ft 1 in)
- Position: Defensive midfielder

Senior career*
Years	Team	Apps	(Gls)
1993–1995	ASK Köflach	7	(0)
1995–1996	ASK Voitsberg	17	(2)
1997–2001	Austria Salzburg	144	(18)
2001–2005	Grazer AK	120	(17)
2005–2010	Red Bull Salzburg	115	(20)
2010–2012	LASK Linz	79	(11)
2012–2014	FC Liefering	17	(2)
Total		499	(70)

International career
2002–2008	Austria	58	(12)

Managerial career
- 2014–2016: FC Liefering (assistant coach)
- 2016–2021: FC Red Bull Salzburg (assistant coach)
- 2021–2022: FC Liefering
- * Club domestic league appearances and goals

René Aufhauser (born 21 June 1976) is an Austrian football coach and a former player.

== Career ==
In the early part of his career he had stints at ASK Köflach, ASK Voitsberg and Red Bull Salzburg. It was at ASK Voitsberg was where his talent was discovered whilst playing defensive midfield.

=== SV Austria Salzburg (1997–2001) ===
He signed for SV Austria Salzburg in 1997 after spending a highly successful six months there in the previous season. Soon the former amateur player was getting called up by the Austria U-21 team. The young midfielder kept a place in the team despite there being a host of big names in the squad. He left in 2001 because the coach was letting him develop. The club he chose was Grazer AK.

=== Grazer AK (2001–2005) ===
At the start of his Grazer AK career he didn't play every game because he had to fight with Slovenian captain Aleš Čeh. His performances for Grazer AK attracted interest from clubs like Everton F.C., Fulham F.C. and Middlesbrough F.C. He left Grazer AK in 2005 for former club Red Bull Salzburg

=== Red Bull Salzburg (2005–2010) ===
His return to his former club has brought more success to his club and international level. During his second spell at Salzburg, this time the club under the ownership of Red Bull, he made 115 league appearances, netting 20 times in the process. Aufhauser also won the Austrian championship twice. In January 2010, he was sent to the reserve team and given the opportunity to leave the club, having only made two league starts that season under new coach Huub Stevens.

=== LASK Linz (2010–2012) ===
Aufhauser completed a move to Bundesliga side LASK Linz at the end of the January 2010 transfer window. His first goal for the club was a winner away to FK Austria Wien during a 1–0 win in March 2010. After the denieing of a licence and the relegation to the 3rd league Aufhauser left the club

=== FC Liefering (2012–2014) ===
Aufhauser signed for FC Liefering, the farm team of FC Red Bull Salzburg. It was intended that he should be the leading figure in this young team. Liefering became champion of the Regionalliga West and in two matches (2:0; 3:0) against Aufhausers former team LASK they were able to reach the First league, the second level in Austrian football.

After two seasons with Liefering his career ended. After that, he became assistant coach at the club.

== International career ==
Despite his good performances he was unconsidered by former national team head coach Herbert Prohaska. Only under Otto Barić he was called up in 2001 as a Grazer AK player against Liechtenstein however he only made it on the bench. He finally made his début under Otto Barić's successor, Hans Krankl against Slovakia on 27 March 2002. Under Hans Krankl he was given a place in the starting 11 as well as under new coach Josef Hickersberger. So far he has participated in 50 international matches, scoring 10 goals.

In the opening game for Austria at UEFA Euro 2008 in Vienna, he fouled Croatian forward Ivica Olić, which led to a penalty for Croatia. Luka Modrić converted the penalty kick into a 1–0 lead in the fourth minute of the game.

== National team statistics ==
Austria national team
Year	Apps	Goals
2002	8	1
2003	8	1
2004	6	0
2005	7	3
2006	7	3
2007	12	2
2008	10	2
Total	58	12

Scores and results list Austria's goal tally first, score column indicates score after each Aufhauser goal.

List of international goals scored by René Aufhauser
No.	Date	Venue	Opponent	Score	Result	Competition	Ref.
1	18 May 2002	BayArena, Leverkusen, Germany	Germany	1–3	2–6	Friendly	
2	11 June 2003	Tivoli Stadion Tirol, Innsbruck, Austria	Belarus	1–0	5–0	UEFA Euro 2004 qualifying	
3	30 March 2005	Ernst-Happel-Stadion, Vienna, Austria	Wales	1–0	1–0	2006 FIFA World Cup qualification	
4	12 October 2005	Ernst-Happel-Stadion, Vienna, Austria	Northern Ireland	1–0	2–0	2006 FIFA World Cup qualification	
5	12 October 2005	Ernst-Happel-Stadion, Vienna, Austria	Northern Ireland	2–0	2–0	2006 FIFA World Cup qualification	
6	15 November 2006	Ernst-Happel-Stadion, Vienna, Austria	Trinidad and Tobago	1–0	4–1	Friendly	
7	15 November 2006	Ernst-Happel-Stadion, Vienna, Austria	Trinidad and Tobago	2–1	4–1	Friendly	
8	15 November 2006	Ernst-Happel-Stadion, Vienna, Austria	Trinidad and Tobago	3–1	4–1	Friendly	
9	24 March 2007	Ernst-Happel-Stadion, Vienna, Austria	Ghana	1–0	1–1	Friendly	
10	13 October 2007	Letzigrund, Zurich, Switzerland	Switzerland	1–1	1–3	Friendly	
11	30 May 2008	LTU Arena, Düsseldorf, Germany	Malta	1–0	5–1	Friendly	
12	6 September 2008	Ernst-Happel-Stadion, Vienna, Austria	France	2–0	3–1	2010 FIFA World Cup qualification	

== Managerial statistics ==
As of match played 23 October 2021

Managerial record by team and tenure
Team	From	To	Record								Ref
Team	From	To	G	W	D	L	GF	GA	GD	Win %	Ref
FC Liefering	1 July 2021	Present	12	8	3	1	28	11	+17	66.67	
Total			12	8	3	1	28	11	+17	66.67	—

== Honours ==
- Austrian Football Bundesliga (3):
  - 2004, 2007, 2009
- Austrian Cup (2):
  - 2002, 2004
