= Tivoli Stadion Tirol =

Sports venue in Innsbruck, Austria

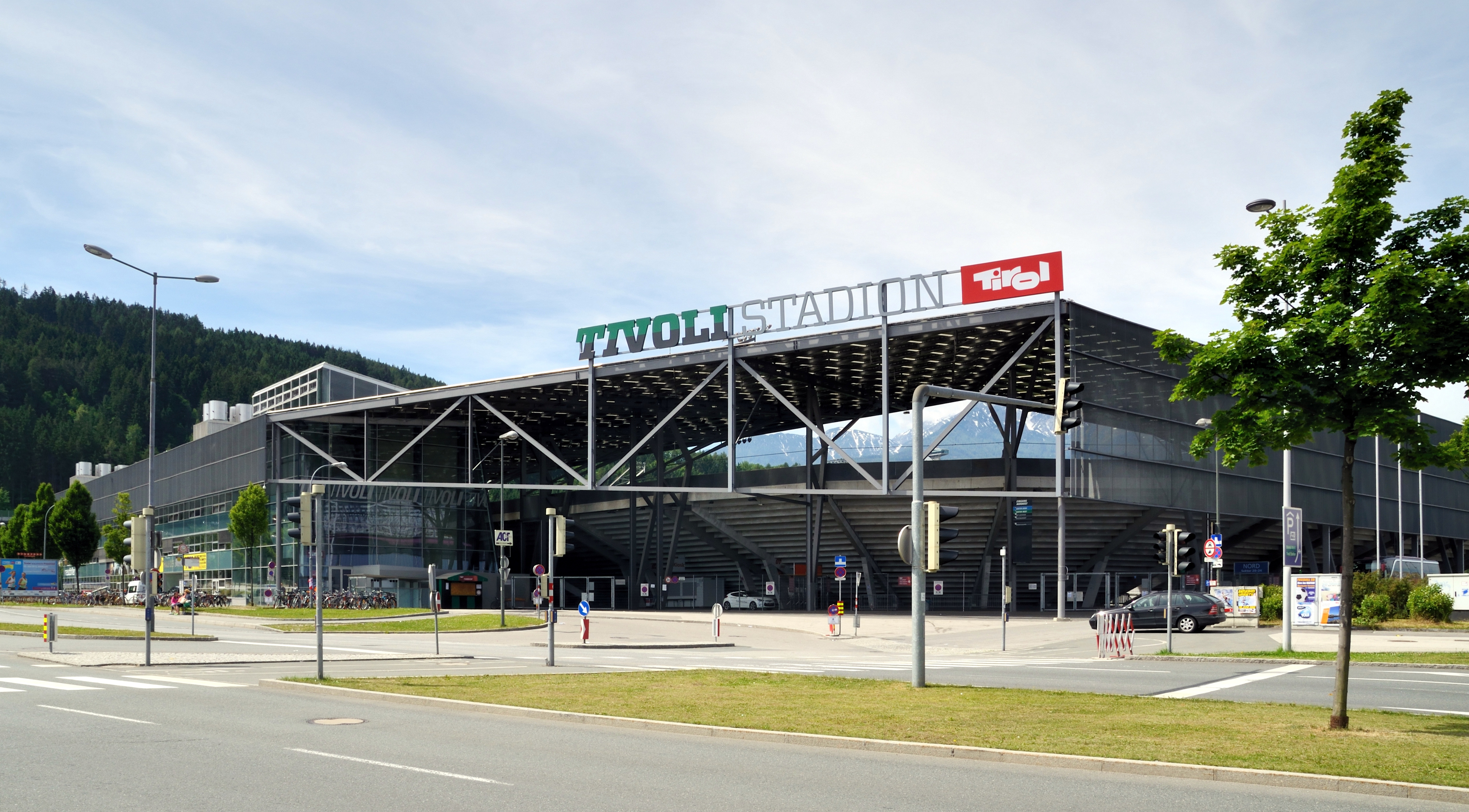
- Interactive map of Tivoli Stadion Tirol
- Former names: Tivoli-Neu
- Location: Innsbruck, Austria
- Coordinates: 47°15′21″N 11°24′39″E
- Capacity: 17,000
- Field size: 105 x 68 m

Construction
- Built: 2000
- Opened: 8 September 2000

Tenants
- WSG Tirol; Raiders Tirol; FC Wacker Innsbruck

The Tivoli Stadion Tirol (formerly named Tivoli-Neu) is a multi-purpose stadium in Innsbruck, Austria. It is currently used mostly for football matches and is the home ground of 2. Liga club Wacker Innsbruck, Bundesliga club WSG Tirol and Raiders Tirol of the European League of Football. The stadium capacity was 17,400 when it was built in 2000. For UEFA Euro 2008, the stadium was temporarily expanded to 30,000 people. The North Stand is fitted with rail seats for safe standing.

It is part of the OlympiaWorld Innsbruck consortium that is responsible for maintaining venues that hosted both the 1964 and the 1976 Winter Olympics.

== History ==
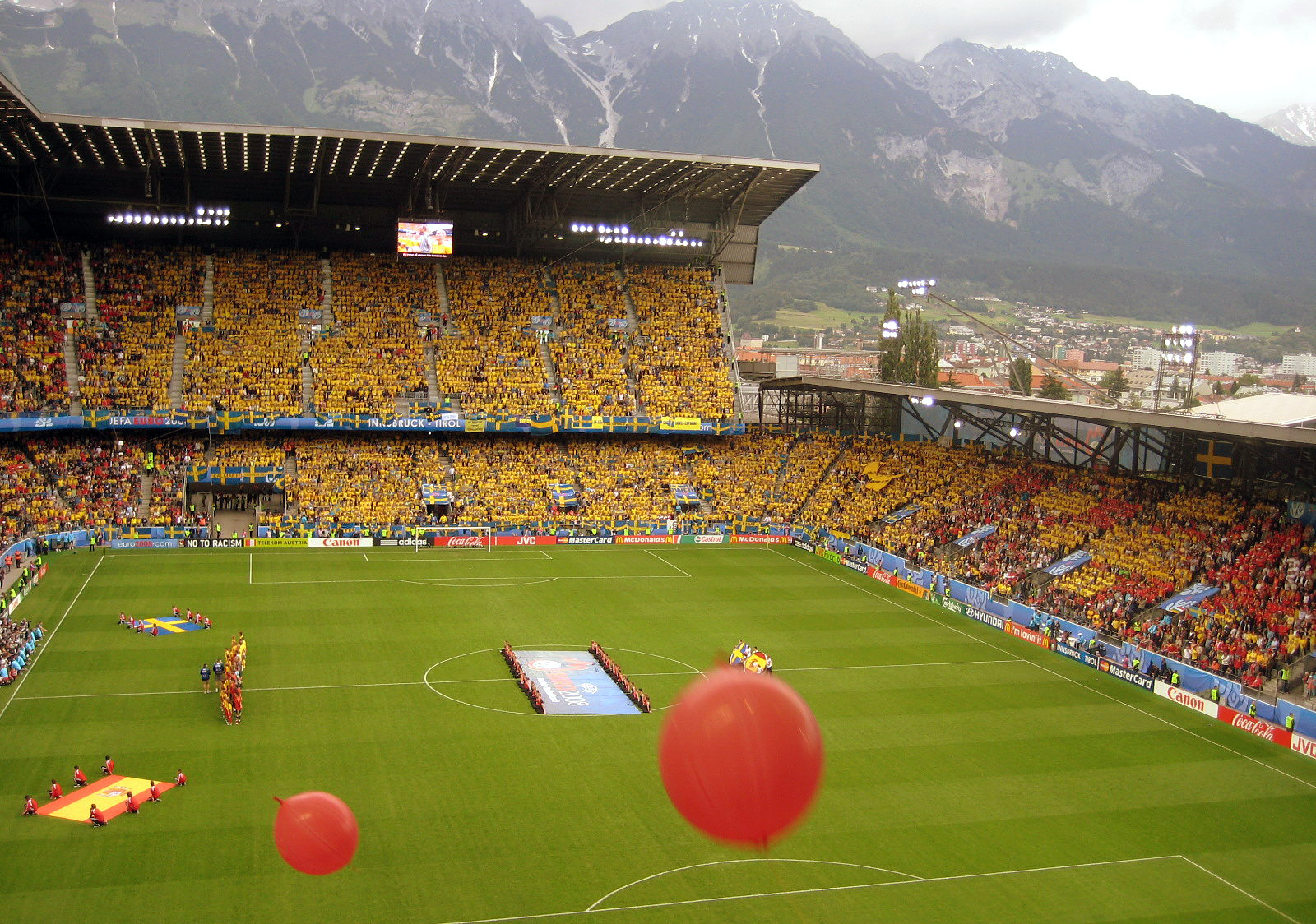
Spain vs Sweden, Euro 2008

Tivoli-Neu was named after the original Tivoli stadium, which was at a different place next to the Sill River.

On May 28, 2010, Spain played an international friendly against Saudi Arabia, winning 3–2.

== Euro 2008 matches ==
| Date | | Result | | Round | Attendance |
|---|---|---|---|---|---|
| 10 June 2008 | Spain | 4–1 | Russia | Group D | 30,772 |
| 14 June 2008 | Spain | 2–1 | Sweden | Group D | 30,772 |
| 18 June 2008 | Russia | 2–0 | Sweden | Group D | 30,772 |

== See also ==
- OlympiaWorld Innsbruck
