= 2023 FIFA Women's World Cup bids =

Football World Cup host nation bids

The 2023 FIFA Women's World Cup bidding process was the process used by FIFA to select the host for the 2023 FIFA Women's World Cup. There were two bids from three countries that sought to host the 2023 FIFA's Women's World Cup. The final bids submitted were from Australia–New Zealand and Colombia. On 25 June 2020, the combined Australia and New Zealand bid officially won the bid to host the Women's World Cup.

== Bid process ==
The bidding timeline was adjusted following the confirmation of the expanded tournament.

The key dates of the bidding process were:

- 15 March 2019: Deadline to submit the completed expression of interest form to FIFA
- 18 March 2019: FIFA dispatching the bidding registration and overview documents
- 16 April 2019: Deadline to submit the completed bidding registration to FIFA
- 18 April 2019: FIFA dispatching hosting documents to the member associations that have returned the bidding registration by the above deadline
- August 2019: Circular sent out for current bidding member associations to reconfirm their interest, and any other eligible member associations to express their interest in bidding
- 16 August 2019: Deadline for new member associations to submit the completed expression of interest form to FIFA
- 2 September 2019: Deadline for submission of the completed bidding registration to FIFA by new interested member associations, and re-confirmation from current bidders
- 3 September 2019: FIFA dispatching the updated bidding registration and overview documents
- 13 December 2019: Submission of the bid book, the signed hosting agreement and all other hosting documents to FIFA
- January/February 2020: Inspection visits to the member associations
- 10 June 2020: FIFA publishing the bid evaluation reports (the Australia-New Zealand bid received the highest score: 4.1 out of 5)
- 25 June 2020: Appointment of the host(s) by the online FIFA Council meeting.

== Official bids ==
=== Australia and New Zealand joint bid ===
No men's or women's FIFA World Cup had been hosted by two or more countries in different confederations. Asian countries have hosted the tournament twice, in 1991 and 2007, both in China. Countries from Oceania have never hosted the tournament.

In 2017 it was first announced that the Australian Government was funding a feasibility study to host the 2023 Women's World Cup. Further funding was put into the bid in early 2018 by Federal Minister for Sport Bridget McKenzie as the government confirmed they were pledging an extra A$4 million for it. The bid was officially launched on 29 October 2018 with the campaign slogan "#GetOnside". Australia unveiled its logo and slogan: "Limitless" launched on 8 July 2019.

Before their hosting of the 2015 FIFA U-20 World Cup, New Zealand officials expressed interest in bidding for the hosting rights of the 2023 FIFA Women's World Cup. FIFA's director of tournaments, Colin Smith, called New Zealand a "major contender" to host the Women's World Cup should it bid. On 25 February 2019 New Zealand Football announced that it will put forward to bid for 2023.

The two countries announced that they would submit a joint bid on 12 December 2019. The combined bid with the slogan "AsOne" featured 13 stadiums in 12 cities, with the opening match to be played at the Eden Park in Auckland, and the final to take place at Stadium Australia in Sydney.

=== Colombia ===
South American countries had never hosted the tournament. In 2016 the Colombian Football Federation indicated an interest to formalize the candidacy of Colombia as host country. Colombia previously hosted the 2011 FIFA U-20 World Cup and the 2016 FIFA Futsal World Cup. One of the requirements to host the World Cup was to have a national women's league, and in 2017 the Colombian Women's Football League played its first season. On 26 January 2019, Colombian President Iván Duque Márquez indicated that he had every intention of applying for Colombia to host the 2023 Women's World Cup.

== Bid evaluation report ==
The bid evaluation was released by FIFA on 10 June 2020. The Australia-New Zealand bid earned the highest score with 4.1 out of 5, and identified as "[appearing] to present the most commercially favourable proposition" to FIFA. It was followed by Japan with a score of 3.8, though that bid was withdrawn after the evaluation's publication.

Colombia earned a score of 2.8, with FIFA noting that the Colombian bid would require "a significant amount of investment and support from both local stakeholders and FIFA" to elevate the bid to the level of the other two, and that "it is not clear if this level of investment will be available".

== Withdrawn bids ==
=== Japan ===
Japan considered bidding on the tournament after declining its initial intention to bid on the 2019 FIFA Women's World Cup. Japan Football Association vice president Kozo Tashima is reported to have said that the facilities will be renovated and ready for the World Cup. On 20 February 2019 The Japan Football Association announced that it will go forward with a long-planned bid to host the 2023 Women's World Cup. On 5 July 2019 Japan unveiled its bid logo along with the slogan "Time to Fly". The bid included eight stadiums, including several venues that are set to play host to the 2020 Summer Olympics football tournament.

Though it was included on the final bid list, the JFA withdrew its bid to host the tournament on 22 June 2020, citing Brazil's withdrawal as unifying the CONMEBOL vote for Colombia, ASEAN Football Federation's backing of Australia and New Zealand, and the unlikelihood of its bid being successful due to the delayed Tokyo 2020 women's football tournament, as the Olympics being postponed to 2021. The JFA also suggested that without the burden of hosting the tournament, it could provide more resources to its national team in the hope of winning the tournament. After Japan's withdrawal, the Asian Football Confederation endorsed the Australia-New Zealand bid.

=== Brazil ===
Brazil formally submitted its bid for the 2023 FIFA Women's World Cup on 13 December 2019. The Brazilian Football Confederation had planned to use eight stadiums in eight cities in this bid – all of which were used in tournaments such as the 2013 FIFA Confederations Cup, 2014 FIFA World Cup, 2016 Summer Olympics and 2019 Copa América. According to the bid, the final would have been played in the Maracanã Stadium, in Rio de Janeiro.

Though it was included in the final bid list, the Brazilian Football Confederation withdrew its bid on 8 June 2020, citing an inability to provide federal government guarantees due to "economic and fiscal austerity" stemming from the COVID-19 pandemic in Brazil.

== Other expressions of interest ==
=== Argentina ===
Argentina formally submitted an expression of interest, but was not included among the final bids submitted.

=== Belgium ===
Belgium was listed as candidates on FIFA's list in August 2019, but was no longer on the updated list in September 2019.

=== Bolivia ===
Bolivia was listed as a candidate on FIFA's list in August 2019, but was no longer on the updated list in September 2019.

=== South Africa ===
On 4 June 2018, the South African Football Association (SAFA) announced its intent to bid for the 2023 FIFA Women's World Cup that had never been hosted in Africa before. South Africa agreed to officially launch the bid after South Africa qualified for the 2019 Women's World Cup, its first time at the finals. On 21 February 2019, South Africa announced it will put forward to the 2023 bid. SAFA announced its withdrawal of the 2023 bid on 11 December 2019, stating its intent to prioritise the domestic game, but said that it would consider a bid for the 2027 tournament.

=== South Korea and North Korea joint bid ===
On 4 March 2019, the Korea Football Association (KFA) announced that South Korea was planning a joint bid with North Korea to host the 2023 event and hopes to be the first to be hosted by more than one country. The joint bid was proposed by FIFA president Gianni Infantino, but was deemed infeasible due to the relations between the two countries. The joint bid and potential solo bid were withdrawn on 13 December 2019, having no agreement made between FIFA and the national government over the use of an organizing committee.

== 2023 Women's World Cup host election results ==
A decision was made by 35 of the 37 members of the FIFA Council; two members, from Colombia and New Zealand respectively, were ineligible to vote as they were bidding nations. Voting was originally scheduled to be by secret ballot (on the assumption of a face-to-face meeting), with results to publish after the vote. As such it was a different format to the voting process for the 2026 Men's World Cup, which saw all eligible FIFA member associations receive one vote each.

The results of the voting are shown in the accompanying table.

=== Election results by FIFA council member ===
Member	Football association	Vote		
Member	Football association	A/NZ	C	Recused
Mahfuza Akhter	Bangladesh	A/NZ		
Shk. Salman bin Ebrahim Al Khalifa	Bahrain	A/NZ		
Zhaocai Du	China PR	A/NZ		
Praful Patel	India	A/NZ		
Kohzo Tashima	Japan	A/NZ		
Mariano V. Araneta Jr	Philippines	A/NZ		
Saoud Al-Mohannadi	Qatar	A/NZ		
AFC subtotal: 7 valid ballots		7	0	0
Lydia Nsekera	Burundi	A/NZ		
Constant Omari	(Democratic Republic of the Congo) Congo DR	A/NZ		
Hany Abo Rida	Egypt	A/NZ		
Almamy Kabele Camara	Guinea	A/NZ		
Ahmad Ahmad	Madagascar	A/NZ		
Walter Nyamilandu	Malawi	A/NZ		
Tarek Bouchamaoui	Tunisia	A/NZ		
CAF subtotal: 7 valid ballots		7	0	0
Vittorio Montagliani	Canada	A/NZ		
Luis Hernández	Cuba	A/NZ		
Pedro Chaluja	Panama	A/NZ		
Sonia Fulford	Turks and Caicos Islands	A/NZ		
Sunil Gulati	United States	A/NZ		
CONCACAF subtotal: 5 valid ballots		5	0	0
Fernando Sarney	Brazil		C	
Ramón Jesurún	Colombia			Recused
Maria Sol Muñoz Altamirano	Ecuador		C	
Alejandro Domínguez	Paraguay		C	
Ignacio Alonso	Uruguay		C	
CONMEBOL subtotal: 4 valid ballots		0	4	1
Rajesh Patel	Fiji	A/NZ		
Johanna Wood	New Zealand			Recused
Lambert Maltock	Vanuatu	A/NZ		
OFC subtotal: 2 valid ballots		2	0	1
Giorgos Koumas	Cyprus		C	
Greg Clarke	England		C	
Noël Le Graët	France		C	
Sándor Csányi	Hungary		C	
Evelina Christillin	Italy		C	
Dejan Savićević	Montenegro		C	
Fernando Gomes	Portugal		C	
Alexey Sorokin	Russia		C	
Aleksander Čeferin	Slovenia		C	
UEFA subtotal: 9 valid ballots		0	9	0
Gianni Infantino	Switzerland	A/NZ		
FIFA subtotal: 1 valid ballot		1	0	0
Total: 35 valid ballots		22 (63%)	13 (37%)	2
