= Riihilahti =

Riihilahti is a surname. Notable people with the surname include:

- Aki Riihilahti (born 1976), Finnish footballer and sports executive
- Daniel Riihilahti (born 2006), Finnish footballer
