= Alexey Sorokin =

Alexey Sorokin may refer to:

- Aleksei Sorokin (politician) (1888–1933), Estonian politician
- Alexey Sorokin (admiral) (1922–2020), Soviet Admiral
- Alexey Sorokin (fashion designer) (born 1983), Russian fashion designer
- Aleksey Sorokin (officer) (1931–1976), member of the Soviet cosmonaut program
- Alexey Sorokin (football administrator) (born 1972), Russian football administrator
