= Costakis Koutsokoumnis =

Cypriot football administrator (1956–2018)

- Κωστάκης Κουτσοκούμνης

11th President of CFA
- In office 10 September 2001 – 5 March 2018
- Preceded by: Marios Lefkaritis
- Succeeded by: Giorgos Koumas

Personal details
- Born: 5 May 1956 Karavas, Cyprus
- Died: 5 March 2018 (aged 61) Nicosia, Cyprus
- Occupation: Football administrator Member, FIFA Council (2017–2018)

Costakis Koutsokoumnis (Greek: Κωστάκης Κουτσοκούμνης; 5 May 1956 – 5 March 2018) was a Cypriot football administrator and a member of the FIFA Council since 2017.

Koutsokoumnis was affiliated with APOEL from Nicosia before becoming vice-president of the Cyprus Football Association (CFA). He was then president of the CFA for 17 years and signed a historic agreement with Cyprus Turkish Football Association in 2013.

== Early life ==
Koutsokoumnis was born on 5 May 1956 in Karavas, Cyprus. He studied statistics and actuarial science as well as a number of courses related to risk management.

== Career ==
Koutsokoumnis was affiliated with APOEL from Nicosia when he first became involved with the Cyprus Football Association (CFA) in 1994. He first became the APOEL representative on the CFA board before becoming head of the national teams department.

In 1997, Koutsokoumnis was appointed as vice-president of the CFA. In 2001, he was elected as president of the CFA and would go on to be re-elected uncontested seven times.

Koutsokoumnis was president of the Cyprus Football Association from 2001 until his death in 2018.

In 2013, Koutsokoumnis signed a historic provisional agreement with Hassan Sertoglu, president of the Cyprus Turkish Football Association. It was the first agreement between the North and South after 58 years.

He held a number of positions with UEFA including third vice-chairman and first vice-chairman of the HatTrick Committee, member of the Assistance Programmes Committee and member of the Licensed Match Agents Committee.

In May 2017, he was elected to the FIFA Council, and was expected to serve until 2019.

== Death ==
Koutsokoumnis was diagnosed with cancer and died from the disease on 5 March 2018.
