= Women in Burundi =

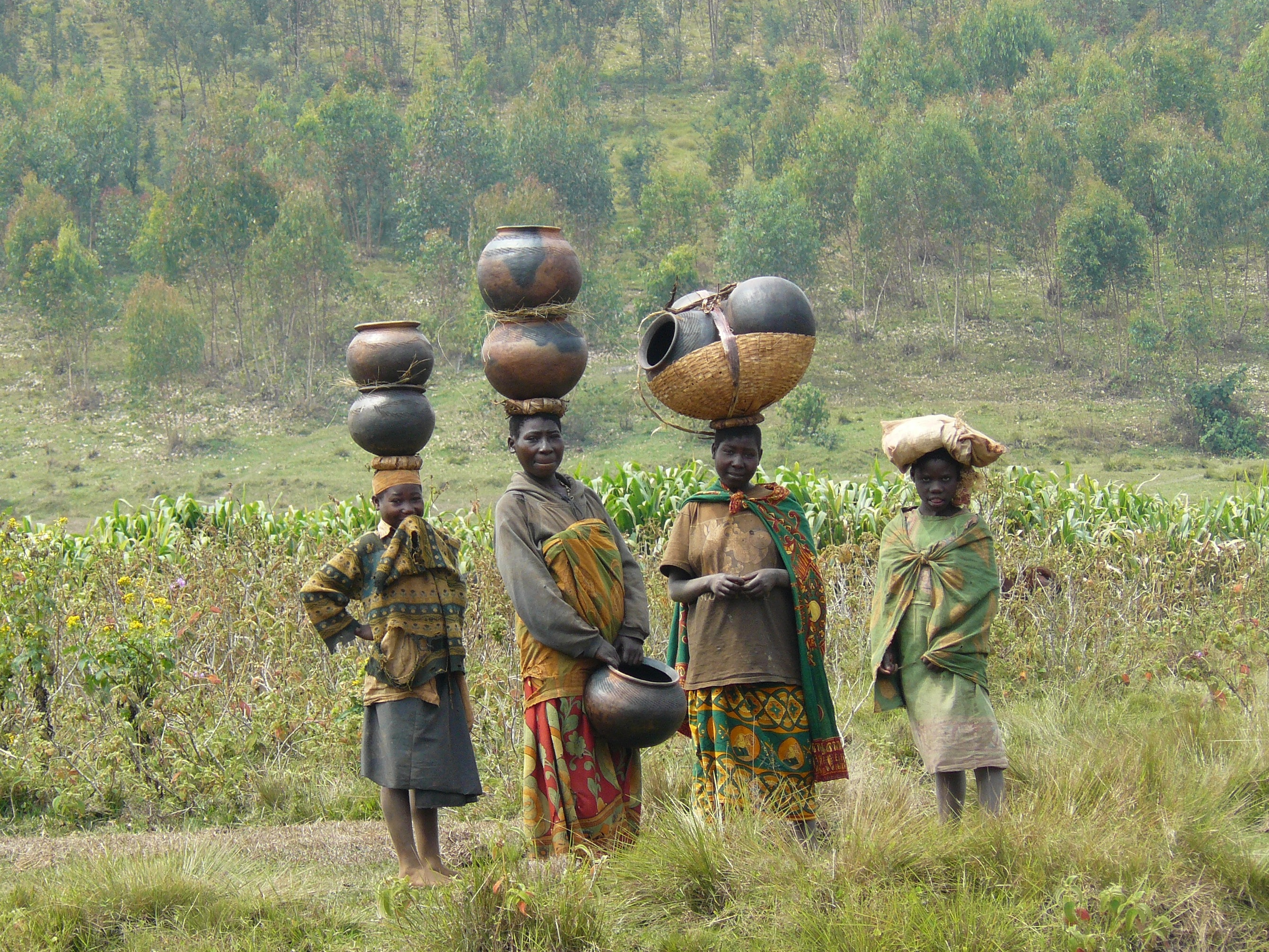
Batwa women with traditional pots. In the Commune of Kiganda, Muramvya Province in July 2007.

Following the recommendations of a Universal Periodic Review (UPR) in 2008, Burundi ratified the International Convention for the Protection of All Persons from Enforced Disappearance (ICPPED), Optional Protocol to the Convention on the Elimination of All Forms of Discrimination Against Women (OP-CEDAW), and the Optional Protocol to the Convention Against Torture (OPCAT).

However, women are underrepresented in power structures. The phenomenon of sexual violence, particularly against women and children, is common in the country. The Initiative for Peacebuilding noted in a 2010 study on gender issues in Burundi that there is a strong correlation between areas of intense military activity and high instances of sexual violence.

== Culture ==
Rural women greet each other in a complex musical form called akazehe, chanting an interlocking vocal rhythm that communicates feelings and narratives about their everyday lives.

== Women's political participation in Burundi ==
=== History ===
Women in Burundi secured the right to vote in 1961. By the time women in Burundi had the right to vote, almost 80% of women around the world had won the fight for suffrage.

Burundi has gone through many political changes since its independence from Belgium in 1962. A failed coup in 1993, ethnic violence between Hutus and Tutsis, and a civil war all were impacted by and affected the role of women in politics. While in other countries around Sub-Saharan Africa the United Nations was facilitating democratization efforts in the 1990s, efforts in Burundi were focused on stabilization due to violence and instability following the 1993 democratic elections. Women and girls were disproportionately the most affected group during Burundi's civil war. However, during this time women also took on more roles in society than was previously deemed acceptable.

Women played a major role in reconciliation efforts, humanitarian campaigns, and peace negotiations. In 1993, Women for Peace was created in Burundi. The group gained momentum and international recognition after joining the umbrella organization CAFOB (Collectif des Associations et ONGs Féminines du Burundi). Another important milestone for women in Burundi was the All-Party Burundi Women's Peace Conference, held in Arusha in July 2000, a month before the signing of the Arusha peace agreement. The conference hosted women from all different economic and social backgrounds and facilitated the drafting of gender-specific initiatives to be included in the agreement.

In 1993, Burundi had its first female prime minister, Sylvie Kinigi. However, women continued to be vastly underrepresented in Burundi's government through 2005; Kinigi was the exception, not the norm. In 2001, women made up 15% of ministerial positions, 9% of the National Assembly, and 18% of the Senate.

As of 2017, Burundi ranked 25th in the world in women's parliamentary representation. Research points to women activists and their work pushing for representation in the wake of the state's civil war as playing a key role in the nation's significant increase in women's representation.

=== Legislative gender quotas ===
Women's representation in government in Africa increased threefold from 1990 to 2010. Studies show that the dramatic increase in representation on the continent may be attributed to political openings, political liberalization, international pressure, and the emergence of women in more positions of power after major conflict in a state.

Before the 1970s, only five states had implemented gender quotas to increase women's representation in government. As of 2011, over 100 countries, including Burundi, implemented gender quotas in their government. Gender quotas can take different forms; reserved seats, legislative quotas for nominees, or voluntary quotas for political parties. It is argued that gender quotas are often adopted because of international pressures, instead of being a sign of modernization, which is why they are seen primarily in developing nations. However, other research in the field shows no systematic patterns in terms of adoption because gender quotas are appearing in countries with varied political, cultural, and economic characteristics.

In the 2005 Constitution of the Republic of Burundi, articles 129, 164, and 182(2) established gender quotas in the state. Burundi's legislative gender quotas established that a minimum of 30% of seats must be held by women in Parliament, including the National Assembly and the Senate, and in the Executive Branch. If the election results do not meet the minimum of 30% of seats being held by women, according to electoral law, the Electoral Administration adds candidates from the underrepresented group who received at least 5% of the votes.

=== Political impacts ===
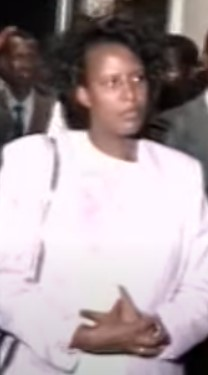
Sylvie Kinigi, Burundi's first and only female Prime Minister up to date

Studies have found that when women are represented at a critical mass in government, at least 30% of the body, descriptive representation, policy responsiveness, and symbolic representation all go up. More specifically, it has been found that states with more women in government will invest more in social welfare, child health care programs, and legislation that serves women. Additionally, perceptions around women's capabilities to achieve beyond traditional gender roles improves among both men and women.

Despite the real steps that Burundi has taken towards more equal representation, women's roles continue to be shaped by patriarchal norms and women are still a marginalized group in the nation. In Burundi, cultural norms assert that women should not speak in public, should not be included In decision making, and are often regarded as illegitimate politicians. Cultural expectations have limited the effectiveness of women's participation in politics.

== Burundian Civil War ==
Amnesty International claims rape, in addition to physical mutilation, was used during the Burundian Civil War as 'a strategy of war'. In 2004 the Hutu rebel group, Forces of National Liberation (FNL), claimed responsibility for killing 160 Congolese Tutsi refugees in a United Nations camp at Gatumba near the Congo border in Burundi. The attack was strongly condemned by the U.N. Security Council, which issued a statement of outrage at the fact that "most of the victims were women, children and babies who were shot dead and burned in their shelters."

== Burundi women's national football team ==
Women's football is now [a] big deal. The standard that we have attained in Africa is good enough. Soon, an African team will challenge seriously for the World Cup. But we need far more support from governments and big business.

— Lydia Nsekera, president of the Football Federation of Burundi (2004-2013)

The Football Federation of Burundi, the country's national association, created a woman's football programme in 2000. By 2006, there were just 455 registered women players, and the absence of a thriving women's game has been an obstacle for the national team. Lydia Nsekera is the head of the national football association.

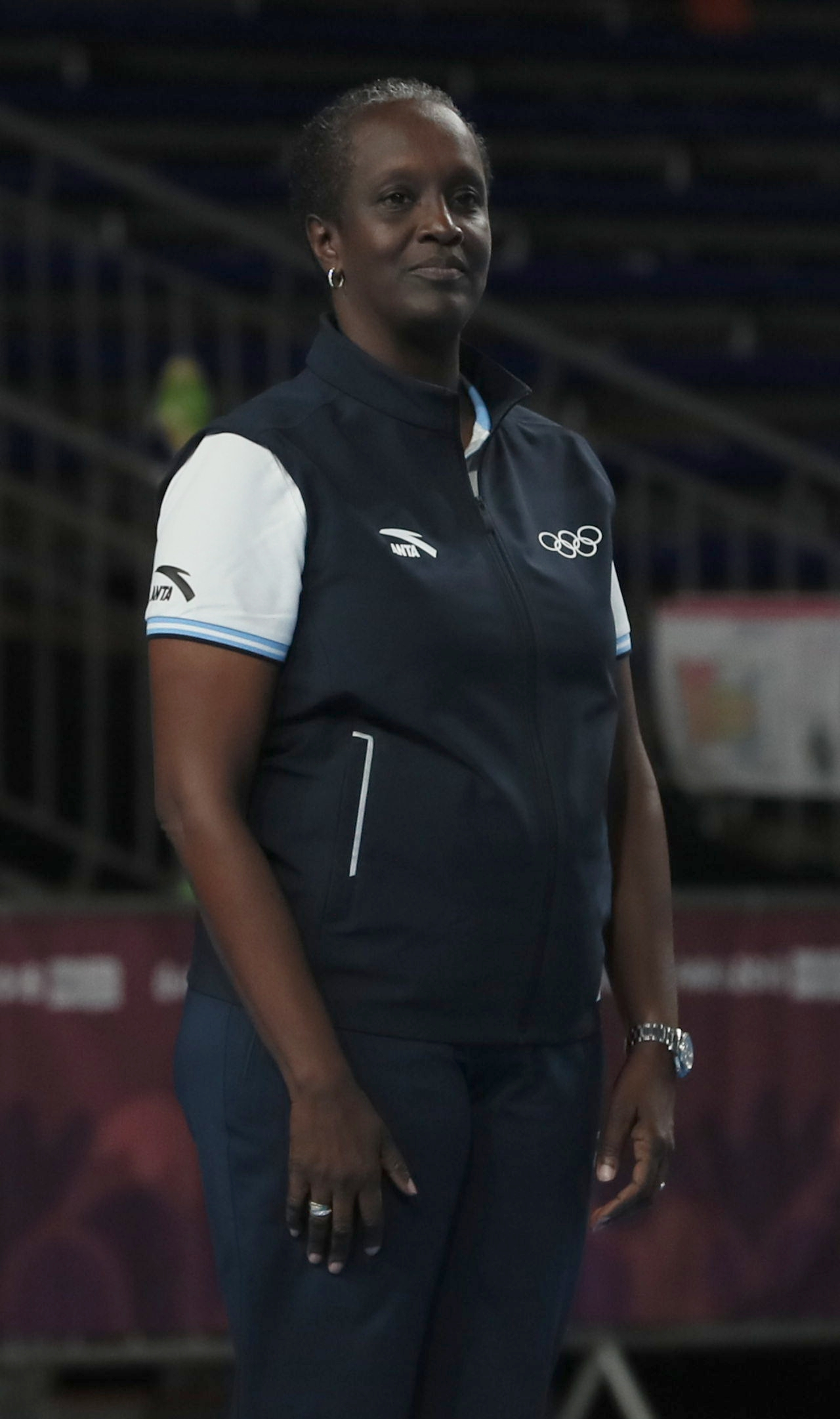
Lydia Nsekera, Minister of Youth, Culture and Sports and Member of IOC and FIFA committee

Outside the national federation, the Commission nationale du football féminin was established by the 1990s, and a league and women's teams were organised in the same period in Bujumbura.

== Notable figures ==
- Sylvie Kinigi - Prime Minister and acting President of Burundi.
- Lydia Nsekera, Minister of Youth, Sports and Culture and member of IOC and Fifa
- Francine Niyonsaba - Middle-distance runner
- Francine Niyomukunzi - Long-distance runner

== See also ==
- Women in Africa
