= Marios Lefkaritis =

- Μάριος Λευκαρίτης

UEFA Executive committee
- In office 1996 – 16 March 2017

10th President of CFA
- In office 1991 – 10 September 2001
- Preceded by: Christos Triantafyllides
- Succeeded by: Costakis Koutsokoumnis

Personal details
- Born: 28 November 1946 (age 79) Limassol, Cyprus
- Occupation: Member, FIFA Council

Marios N. Lefkaritis (Greek: Μάριος Λευκαρίτης; born on 28 November 1946 in Limassol) is a Cypriot football administrator and industrial manager. He is honorary president of the Cyprus Football Association. Since 1996 he has been a member of the UEFA Executive Committee, and since 2007 he is also a member of the FIFA Council. Leftarikis is one of the directors of the Cypriot oil company Petrolina. It belongs to the Lefkaritis Group, which operates mainly in trade, bottling and transportation of petroleum and liquefied petroleum gas.

== Life ==
Since 1971, he has been working for the Cypriot oil company Petrolina, part of family-owned Lefkaritis Group. From 1972 to 1977 he was a board member of the football club Apollon Limassol. From 1985 he was a member of the Presidium of the Cyprus Football Association. Starting in 1991, he spent ten years as President of the Association and was subsequently Honorary President. Since 2002, Lefkaritis has been honorary president of the Romanian football club FC Farul Constanța.

Lefkaritis is married, has three daughters and lives in Limassol.
