= Mathurin de Chacus =

Beninese football manager

- Born: 9 November 1958 (age 66); Benin
- Occupation(s): Member, FIFA Council

Mathurin de Chacus (born 9 November 1958) is a Beninese football administrator who is a member of the FIFA Council since 2021. He was elected president of the Benin Football Federation in 2018.
