= Almamy Kabele Camara =

- Born: 29 May 1952 (age 73); Guinea
- Occupations: Member, FIFA Council

Almamy Kabele Camara (born 29 May 1952), is a Guinean football official. Since February 2011, he has been a member of the CAF Executive Committee and since 2012 the 2nd Vice President of this committee.

Furthermore, he was elected as a member of the FIFA Council on 29 September 2016.
