= Comoros Football Federation =

Football governing body in the Comoros

CAF
- Founded: 1979
- FIFA affiliation: 2005
- CAF affiliation: 2003
- COSAFA affiliation: 2007
- President: El Fardou Mahamat Abdou
- Vice-President: Abdoukader Gouled

The Fédération de Football des Comores (FFC) is the governing body of football in the Comoros. It was founded in 1979, affiliated to FIFA in 2005 and to CAF in 2003. It organizes the national football league and the national team. The first official international played by Comoros was played on the 17 November 2007 against Madagascar for the qualification of 2010 FIFA World Cup and the African Cup of Nations 2010. Comores recorded its first win in international football by beating Botswana 1-0 in 2016.

== President ==
- Kanizat Ibrahim (Normalization President) (November 2019 – February 2021)
- Said Ali Said Athouman (February 2021 –present)
