= Yasser Al Misehal =

Saudi Arabian football administrator

- Born: Yasser bin Hassan bin Mohammed al-Misehal; 15 January 1974 (age 52); Saudi Arabia
- Occupations: Member, FIFA Council

Yasser bin Hassan bin Mohammed al-Misehal (Arabic: ياسر بن حسن بن محمد المسحل; born 15 January 1974), is a Saudi Arabian football administrator who is a member of the FIFA Council since February 2023.

He had been the eighth president of the Saudi Arabian Football Federation since its official establishment in 1956. He was elected in June 2019 by acclamation by the General Assembly of the Saudi Football Association for its fourth session from 2019 to 2023 and elected for the second term from 2023 to 2027.

== Early life and education ==
He graduated with a bachelor's degree with honors in financial management from King Fahd University of Petroleum and Minerals in 1996.

== Career ==
Al Mishehal is an honorary member of Al-Ettifaq Club since 1997.

He was a member of the Al-Aghmal Youth Committee at the Chamber of Commerce in Riyadh from 2009 to 2016.

Al Mishehal was elected president of the Saudi Pro League in June 2016. He submitted his resignation in 2017.

Al Mishehal was elected president of the Saudi Arabian Football Federation in June 2019.

In February 2023, Al Mishehal became one of the members of the FIFA Council, as he was elected in January 2023.
