= Pedro Chaluja =

Panamanian football administrator

- Born: 14 March 1962 (age 64)
- Occupation: Businessman
- Known for: Member of the FIFA Council and the CONCACAF Council
- Title: President of the Panamanian Football Federation

Pedro Chaluja (born 14 March 1962) is a Panamanian football administrator, president of the Panamanian Football Federation, and a member of the CONCACAF Council and the FIFA Council.
