= Order of Fiji =

Highest Fijian honour

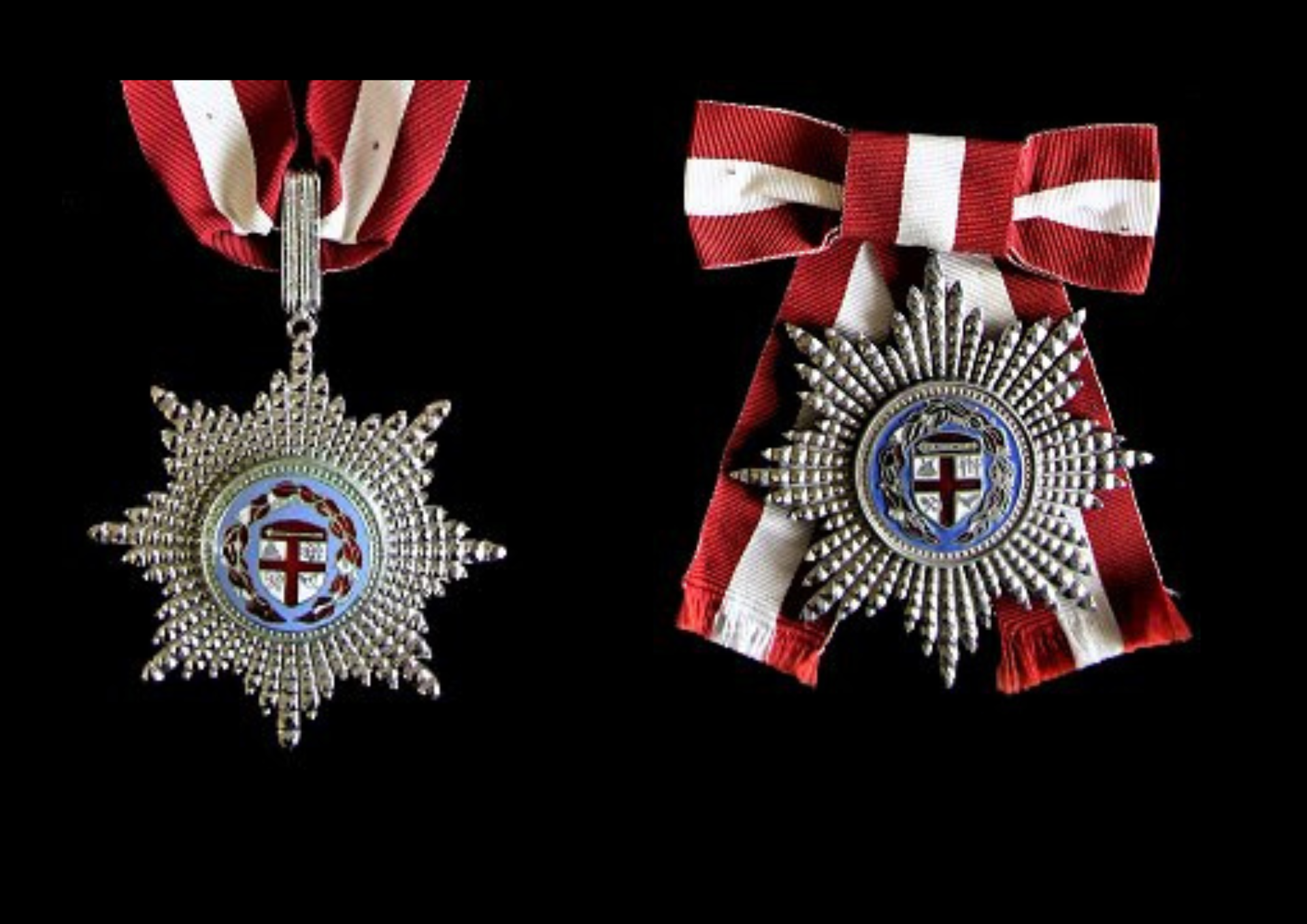
- Type: State Order
- Established: 1 March 1995
- Country: Fiji
- Ribbon: Red with a white central stripe. Awards in the military division have a narrow red stripe bisecting the white central stripe.
- Eligibility: Fijian nationals or anyone who makes an impact for Fiji
- Awarded for: Achievement and merit to Fiji and mankind as a whole.
- Chancellor: President of Fiji
- Grades: Companion (CF), Officer (OF), Member (MF), Medal (MOF)

Precedence
- Next (higher): None
- Next (lower): President's Cross
- Ribbon of the General Division Ribbon of the Military Division

The Order of Fiji is the highest honour of the Fijian honours system. Established 1 March 1995, the order is presented for achievement and merit to Fiji and mankind as a whole. The order is divided into a general division and military division, and is presented in three classes, with an associated medal.

The President of Fiji serves as the chancellor of the order and also as the order's Principal Companion. Following their terms of office, former Presidents remain as Companions of the Order of Fiji.

The Order of Fiji has been a Commonwealth honour ever since Fiji returned to its membership of the Commonwealth in October 1997, albeit, as a republic in the Commonwealth of Nations

== Grades and divisions ==
The Order of Fiji is awarded in a military division and a general division. It is awarded in three classes and a medal with the following post-nominal letters:

- Companion (CF)
- Officer (OF)
- Member (MF)
- Medal (MOF)

== Notable recipients ==
- King Tupou VI of Tonga
- Ratu Sir Kamisese Mara
- Frank Bainimarama
- Aiyaz Sayed-Khaiyum
- Sir Paul Reeves
- Ben Ryan
- Vijay Singh
- Narendra Modi
- Droupadi Murmu
- Sri Sri Ravi Shankar
- Anthony Albanese

== Members ==
=== Companions ===
Photo	Name	Rank	Know For
	Ratu Wiliame Katonivere	Companion	Former President of Fiji
	Frank Bainimarama	Companion	Former Prime Minister of Fiji and Commander of the Republic of Fiji Military forces
	Aiyaz Sayed-Khaiyum	Companion	Former Attorney General and Minister for Economy of Fiji
	Anthony Gates	Companion	Former Chief Justice of Fiji
	Vijay Singh	Companion	Champion of the 2000 Masters Tournament

=== Honorary Companions ===
Photo	Name	Rank	Known For
	King Tupou VI	Honorary Companion	King of Tonga
	Droupadi Murmu	Honorary Companion	President of India
	Narendra Modi	Honorary Companion	Prime Minister of India
	Murray McCully	Honorary Companion	Former Minister for Foreign Affairs For New Zealand
	Anthony Albanese	Honorary Companion	Prime Minister of Australia

=== Officers ===
Photo	Name	Rank	Known For
	George Konrote	Officer	Former President of Fiji
	Jerry Tuwai	Officer	Fijian Rugby 7's Player
	Ben Ryan	Officer	Former Fijian Rugby 7's Coach
	Rajesh Patel	Officer	President of the Fiji Football Association
