= Ben Ryan (rugby union) =

Ben Ryan, CF
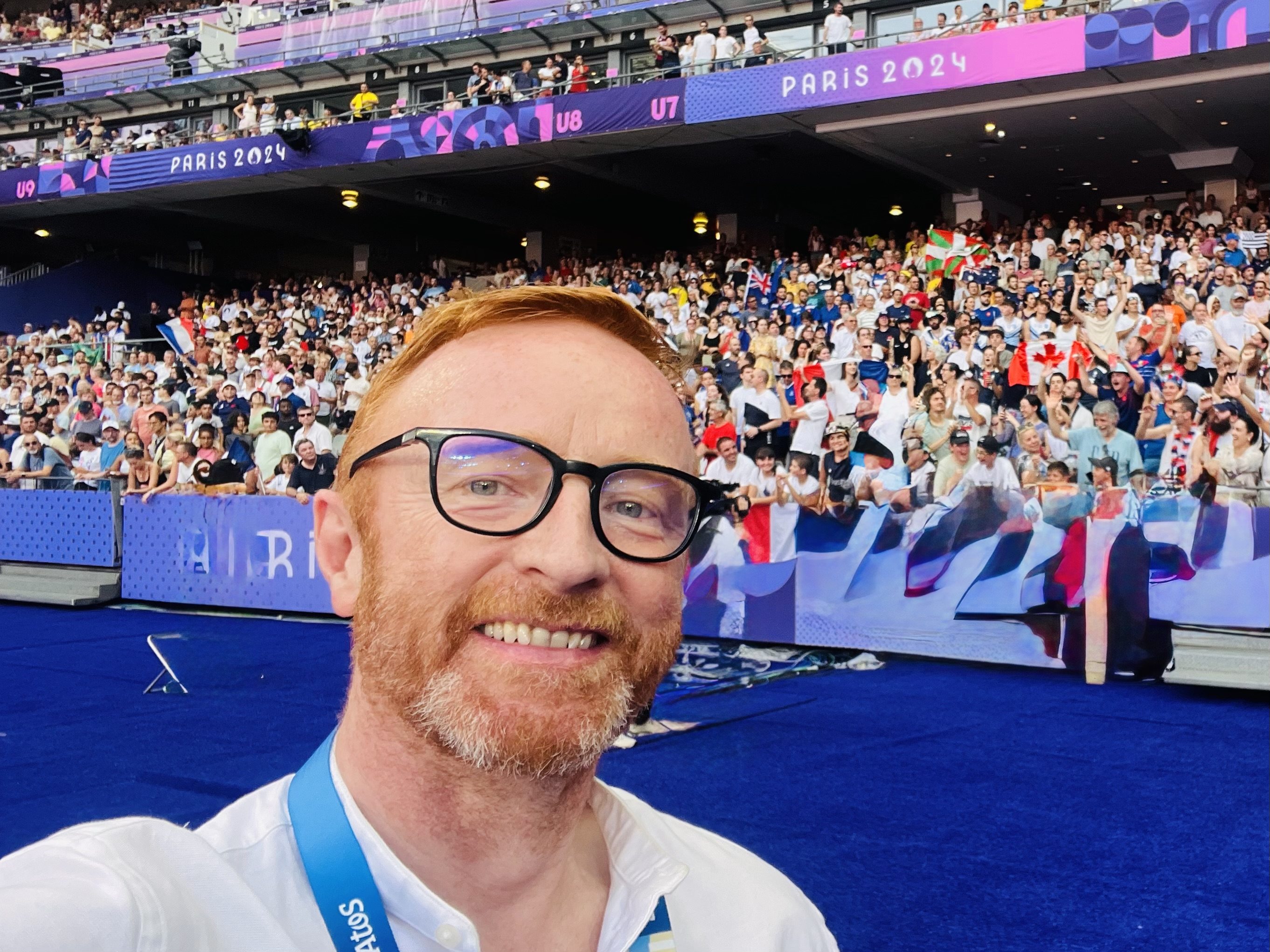
- Born: 11 September 1971 (age 55) Wimbledon, London
- Occupation: Performance Director

Rugby union career
- Position: Scrum-half
Coaching career
- Years: Team
- 2007–2013: England Sevens
- 2013–2016: Fiji Sevens

Ben Ryan CF (born 11 September 1971) is an English sports performance director and former rugby union coach, best known for leading Fiji sevens to the gold medal in rugby sevens at the 2016 Rio Olympics, the country’s first Olympic medal.

He is currently Performance Director at Premier League football club Brentford.

Ryan previously served as head coach of the England and Fiji national rugby sevens teams.

== Youth and education ==
Ryan was educated at Strand on the Green Junior School and Wimbledon College. As a youth he was a member of Thames Valley Harriers, competing as a sprinter.

He graduated from Loughborough University with a BSc in Sports Science and later completed an MPhil in Education at the University of Cambridge, where he earned two Blues in rugby union as a scrum-half in the Varsity Matches of 1995 and 1996.

During his time at Cambridge, he was part of sides that recorded notable victories over touring teams including Samoa and the Queensland Reds.

Ryan later worked as a teacher at St Edward’s School, Oxford, where he was Head of Physical Education and established the school’s GCSE and A-Level Physical Education programmes.

== Playing career ==
Ryan played professional rugby union following the sport’s transition to professionalism in 1995.

He competed in the English First Division then the highest domestic league in England with West Hartlepool.

He also played extensively for Nottingham, who had recently been relegated from the top tier and remained one of the leading clubs in the English game at the time.During his playing career he featured in multiple positions, notably scrum-half, centre and full-back.. Injuries and teaching commitments later led him to transition into coaching.

== Coaching career ==
Ryan began coaching while working in education, initially progressing through representative and age-grade rugby. He coached at county level, South West England and Oxford University Under-21s before moving into the national pathway with England Under-18s. He later served as Director of Rugby at Newbury RFC, where the club achieved promotion during the 2004–05 season and reached the highest league position in its history. Alongside this, Ryan taught at St Edward’s School, Oxford, where during his tenure the school’s rugby programme achieved its strongest period of performance, with players progressing into England representative pathways across multiple age groups.

=== England Sevens (2006–2013) ===
Ryan was appointed head coach of the England national rugby sevens team in 2006.

He initially combined the role with his position as Director of Rugby at Newbury RFC before moving into a full-time position with the Rugby Football Union in 2007. During his first year in the role, he also continued to coach England Under-18s within the national pathway.

During his tenure, Ryan played a key role in the professionalisation of the England Sevens programme, including the introduction of the first full-time player contracts awarded by the RFU.

Under his leadership, England won consecutive Dubai Sevens titles and defeated New Zealand in New Zealand, going on to win the New Zealand leg of the World Series for the first time.

Ryan-led England teams also achieved tournament victories against New Zealand in New Zealand, Australia in Australia and South Africa in South Africa.

He also led England to victory at the Junior Commonwealth Games the first and, to date, only time a British or European team has won the competition.

Over six seasons in charge, Ryan led England in 56 World Series tournaments, reaching the semi-finals or better on 28 occasions, and guided the team to the final of the 2013 Rugby World Cup Sevens , England’s first appearance in the final of that competition in 20 years.

He stepped down from the role in August 2013.

=== Fiji Sevens (2013–2016) ===
Ryan was appointed head coach of the Fiji national sevens team in September 2013. Under his leadership, Fiji won back-to-back World Rugby Sevens Series titles in 2014–15 and 2015–16, as well as nine World Series tournaments across his tenure.

At the 2016 Olympic Games in Rio de Janeiro, Fiji won the inaugural men’s rugby sevens gold medal , the country’s first Olympic medal.

Following the Games, the team was recognised by the International Olympic Committee as the Best Male Team Performance of the Rio Olympic Games. Ryan stepped down following the Olympics.

In recognition of his contribution to Fijian sport and society, he was awarded the Companion of the Order of Fiji. He was also installed within the chiefly system of Serua Province and given the chiefly name Ratu Peni Rayani Latianara, along with land in Serua. Ryan has been depicted on Fijian legal tender issued following the Olympic victory, including a circulating 50-cent coin and a commemorative $7 banknote, both of which are legal tender.

In 2016, he was also named Pacific Person of the Year.

=== Post-Olympic work ===
Following the 2016 Olympics, Ryan undertook advisory and high-performance consultancy roles in elite sport.

He worked with the French Rugby Federation (FFR), supporting high-performance development across the national programme, including the men’s and women’s sevens teams.

Ryan worked with the programme during Olympic cycles that later culminated in France winning the men’s rugby sevens gold medal at the 2024 Olympic Games in Paris. He left his involvement with the French programme in 2022 upon joining Brentford.

He has also worked as a consultant for UK Sport and Nike. Ryan has served as an ambassador for HSBC and Fiji Airways and has been a member of the performance advisory group for the Lawn Tennis Association (LTA).

=== Brentford FC ===
In June 2022, Ryan moved into association football when he was appointed to the newly created role of Performance Director at Premier League club Brentford.

In this role, he has overall responsibility for a broad range of performance-related departments across the club, including medical, sports science, research and development, data and technology, player care, team operations, catering and training-ground performance services.

Ryan is part of the club’s senior football leadership group, working alongside Technical Director Lee Dykes and Head Coach Keith Andrews under Director of Football Phil Giles.

== Publications and media ==
Ryan is the author of Seven’s Heaven: The Beautiful Chaos of Fiji’s Olympic Dream, published in 2018.

The book was shortlisted for the William Hill Sports Book of the Year Award in 2018 and won The Telegraph Sports Book of the Year Award in 2019.

Ryan also hosted the High Performance with Ben Ryan podcast, in which he interviewed leaders from sport and performance environments. The podcast ran until his appointment at Brentford in 2022.

== Honours and awards ==
Companion of the Order of Fiji (CF)	22 August 2016

After winning gold and returning to Fiji, Ryan was accorded the highest order when he was awarded the Companion of the Order of Fiji. He is depicted on the reverse of a circulating 50 cent coin, and on the front of a circulating commemorative $7 banknote.

== Personal life ==
Ryan married Natalie Peck on 4 July 2009. They separated in September 2016 and were officially divorced on 2 August 2017. They had no children. In April 2022, he got engaged to TV presenter Michelle Ackerley. They married in May 2024. Their daughter Nala was born in October 2025. They current reside in SW London.
