= FIFA Football Stakeholders Committee =

- Headquarters: Zürich, Switzerland
- Official language: English, French, Spanish, German
- Chairman: Victor Montagliani
- Deputy Chairman: Evelina Christillin
- Website: https://www.fifa.com/who-we-are/committees/committee/1946675/

The FIFA Football Stakeholders Committee is one of the nine standing committees of FIFA. It deals with the structure of the game between players, clubs, leagues, associations, and confederations within FIFA.

== Membership ==
Membership
Name
Chairman
(Canada) Victor Montagliani
Deputy Chairman
(Italy) Evelina Christillin
Members
(Saudi Arabia) Ahmed Eid Al-Harbi
(Uruguay) Alejandro Balbi
(England) Bobby Barnes
(Brazil) Cafu
(United States) Carlos Cordeiro
(Argentina) Rodolfo D'Onforio
(Nigeria) Shehu Dikko
(Italy) Umberto Gandini
(United States) Don Garber
(England) Ivan Gazidis
(Portugal) Fernando Gomes
(Sweden) Caroline Jonsonn
(Japan) Mitsuru Murai
(Denmark) Mads Oland
(Peru) Edwin Oviedo
(France) Philippe Piat
(Finland) Aki Riihilahti
(Switzerland) Claudius Schäffer
(Germany) Christian Seifert
(Senegal) Augustin Senghor
(Netherlands) Edwin van der Sar
