= Kanizat Ibrahim =

Comorian business manager and football administrator

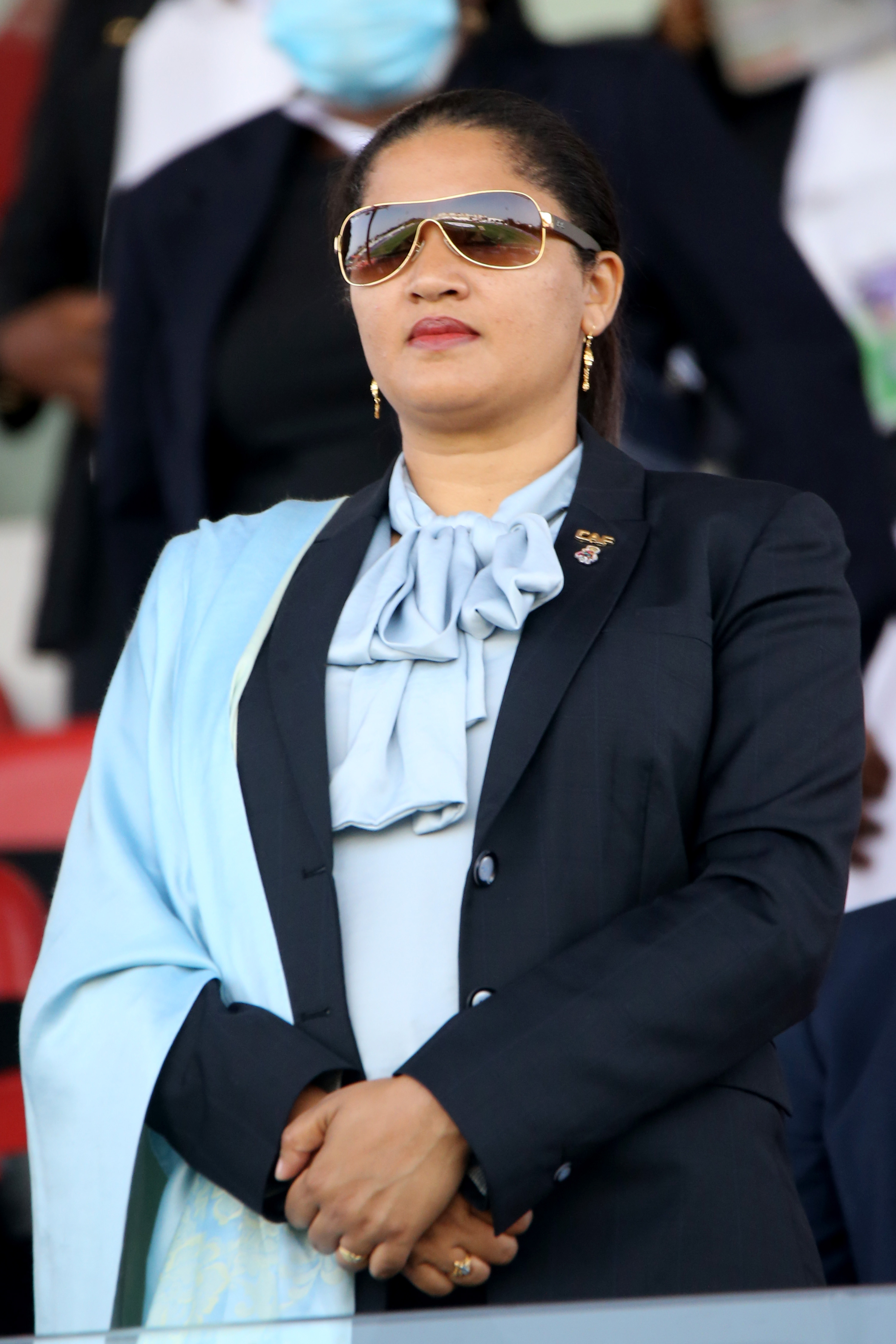

President of the Comoros Football Federation
- In office November 2019 – February 2021
- Succeeded by: Said Ali Said Athouman

Personal details
- Education: Montesquieu University
- Occupation: Business manager, Football Executive

Kanizat Ibrahim (born 1975) is a Comoran business manager and football administrator. She is the 5th vice president of Confederation of African Football (CAF), making her the first female vice-president and the president of the organizing committee for women's football of CAF.

== Education and career ==
Kanizat Ibrahim, a graduate of the Montesquieu University in Bordeaux, is a business manager. She is general manager of Synercom Comores, a communication and events agency, or even Ifocom, IMI Concept, Karloc & Services, Epsilon Security, in the sectors of marketing, new technologies and communication. From 2005 to 2007, she was vice-president of the International Junior Chamber of the Comoros, leading the entrepreneurship commission. In 2009, she worked with the team organizing the first marathon International of the Comoros and the first female marathon of the Comoros.

== Sports Administration ==
=== FFC ===
After the Comoros Football Federation (FFC) was plunged into a governance crisis, the International Federation of Association Football (FIFA) decided in March 2019 to appoint a Standardization Committee for the FFC, which would be responsible for managing day-to-day affairs, revising the statutes, the Electoral Code and the Code of Ethics of the Federation and organizing transparent elections. Ibrahim Kanizat was appointed as the chair by Kanizat Ibrahim starting her duties on November 12, 2019. Her tenure was through to 30 September 2020, but was extended by five months by FIFA due to the COVID-19 pandemic's restrictions. The committee however ultimately ended their tenure after accomplishing their objective of organizing an elections of which Said Ali Said Athoumani was elected as the new FFC president.

=== CAF ===
On March 12, 2021, she was elected female representative on the executive committee of the Confederation of African Football (CAF) for a four-year term. The next day, she was appointed vice-president of CAF; making her the first Comoran personality to have reached such a level of responsibility within the organization; Her appointment also made her the first woman vice-president in the history of CAF.

On May 18, 2021, she was appointed president of the organizing committee for women's football of CAF succeeding Isha Johansen.
