= Daniel Riihilahti =

Finnish footballer (born 2006)

Personal information
- Date of birth: 9 March 2006 (age 20)
- Place of birth: Helsinki, Finland
- Position: Midfielder

Team information
- Current team: Brann 2

Youth career
- MPS
- –2023: HJK
- 2023: → Brann (youth loan)

Senior career*
Years	Team	Apps	(Gls)
2023–	Brann 2	26	(2)

International career^{‡}
2023	Finland U17	4	(0)
2023–	Finland U18	5	(2)
- * Club domestic league appearances and goals as of 9 May 2025 ‡ National team caps and goals as of 9 June 2024

Daniel Riihilahti (born 9 March 2006) is a Finnish professional footballer playing as a midfielder for Norwegian club Brann 2.

== Club career ==
Riihilahti started to play football in a youth team of Malmin Palloseura (MPS) in Malmi, Helsinki. He played in the HJK Helsinki youth academy in Finland until the summer 2023, when he was first loaned out to Norwegian club SK Brann. While featuring in the club's youth team, he made his senior debut with Brann II reserve team in the third-tier league 2. divisjon. After the season, he joined Brann organisation on a permanent transfer and signed a professional contract with the club in December 2023. HJK is entitled to an undisclosed transfer fee whenever Riihilahti signs a contract with the Brann first team.

== International career ==
Since 2023, Riihilahti has represented Finland at under-17 and under-18 youth national team levels.

== Personal life ==
He is the son of Finnish TV and sports reporter Riku Riihilahti, and the nephew of Aki Riihilahti, former Finland national team midfielder and the current CEO of HJK Helsinki. His older brother Kristoffer Riihilahti plays football in Grankulla IFK. Their mother is Norwegian.

== Career statistics ==
As of 9 May 2025

Appearances and goals by club, season and competition
Club	Season	League			National cup		Continental		Other		Total	
Club	Season	Division	Apps	Goals	Apps	Goals	Apps	Goals	Apps	Goals	Apps	Goals
Brann 2 (loan)	2023	2. divisjon	2	0	–		–		–		2	0
Brann 2	2024	2. divisjon	19	1	–		–		–		19	1
Brann 2	2025	2. divisjon	5	1	–		–		–		5	1
Brann 2	Total		24	2	0	0	0	0	0	0	24	2
Career total			26	2	0	0	0	0	0	0	26	2
