= Alexey Sorokin (fashion designer) =

Russian fashion designer

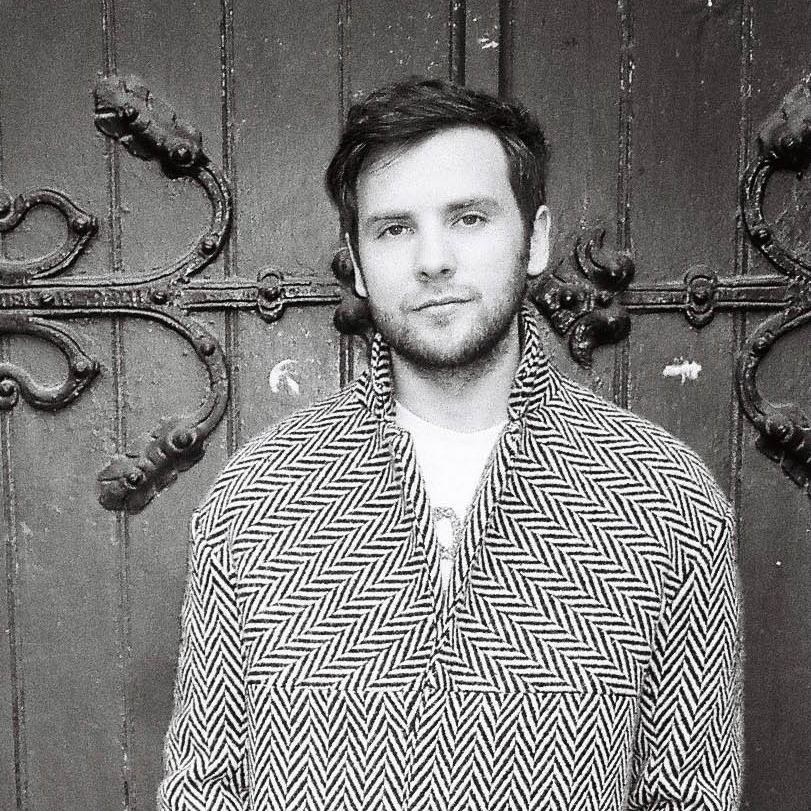
- Born: November 29, 1983 (age 42)
- Education: M.A. in Fashion Design
- Label: Homo Consommatus

Alexey Sorokin (born 29 November 1983) is a Russian fashion designer of womenswear label Homo Consommatus.

== Education ==
In 2008, the Saint Petersburg Stieglitz State Academy of Art and Design housed the designer's final graduation collection. Its main idea was consumerism and the 'wrapping of a person' as means of identification and self-defense.

== Career ==
Two years after the graduation Sorokin set up luxury womenswear label Homo Consommatus, which is Latin for "consuming person". In October 2011, the Homo Consommatus womenswear Spring/Summer 2012 collection debuted at Aurora Fashion Week Russia supported by LMA Presents - local project for emerging designers. Alexey subsequently showed his Autumn/Winter 2012-13 collection at Aurora Fashion Week Russia. These collections received notable praise in the European press from L'Officiel, InStyle and Grazia (Italy), among others.

In September 2012 Alexey Sorokin brought his label to New York Fashion Week to present his Spring/Summer 2013 collection at Runway@Pier57. It was a digital presentation, with over 500 guests, including journalists from Forbes, NU Mode, Wall Street Journal, WWD, and others.

Since 2012 Sorokin shows his collections in New York and Paris during private events for clients and press. Homo Consommatus "luxury designs with innovative touch have received a coverage in Russian and international editions of Vogue, Harper's Bazaar, Elle, Grazia, Buro 24/7 and Cosmopolitan.

In September 2014 Sorokin presented his Spring Summer 2015 collection at London Fashion Week's Fashion Scout. The collection inspired by Eric Klinenberg's Going Solo, architecture of Seagram Building and Hearst Tower showed the evolution of Homo Consommatus "to intimate and exclusive label through using luxurious cashmeres, silks and cottons with manual finishings as polyurethane cover, hot press gluing and plastic embroidering". The collection received a massive feedback and was spotlighted by singer Lady Gaga who wears Homo Consommatus pieces.

A philosophical approach to fashion prompts Sorokin to draw inspiration from such unusual subjects as pollution, consumerism and the meaning of life. These themes can be seen throughout the brands collection. However Homo Consommatus pieces are quite utilitarian and harmoniously fit into the context of contemporary style. Their unique aesthetic is achieved by using unusual, innovative materials, through experiments with textiles and new production technologies. Noted for their significant work with the form, throughout the collections the brand plays with proportions, contrasts to the length can be seen.

Two looks from Sorokin's Homo Consommatus Spring Summer 2013 collection became a part of The Museum at FIT permanent collection and were showcased at Global Fashion Capitals Exhibition in 2015.

Sorokin's studio is currently bases in St. Petersburg, Russia where he creates seasonal collection and produce private orders.
