= Lydia Nsekera =

Burundian sports official

Excellency Lydia Nsekera
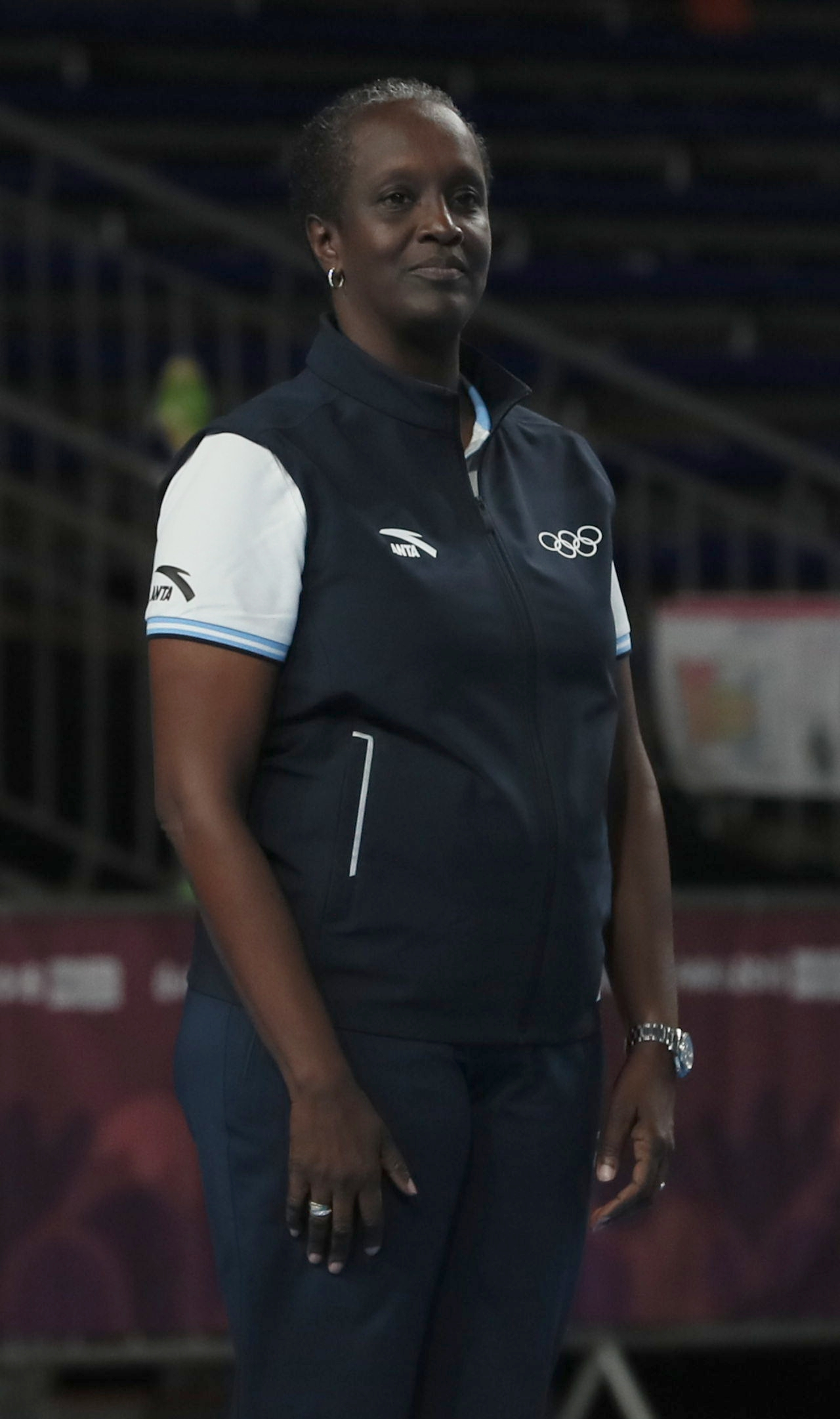
- Nsekera at the 2018 Summer Youth Olympics

Minister of Youth, Sports and Culture of Burundi
- Incumbent
- Assumed office 5 August 2025
- President: Évariste Ndayishimiye
- Prime Minister: Nestor Ntahontuye
- Preceded by: Ézechiel Nibigira

President of the National Olympic Committee
- Incumbent
- Assumed office 19 March 2017
- President: Pierre Nkurunziza
- Preceded by: Évariste Ndayishimiye

Member of the International Olympic Committee
- Incumbent
- Assumed office 2009
- President: Jacques Rogge

Member of the FIFA executive committee
- In office May 2013 – March 2021
- President: Sepp Blatter
- Succeeded by: Isha Johansen

President of the Football Federation of Burundi
- In office September 2004 – 17 November 2013
- President: Pierre Nkurunziza
- Succeeded by: Révérien Ndikuriyo

Personal details
- Born: 20 April 1967 (age 59) Bujumbura, Burundi
- Education: University of Burundi
- Profession: Sports official

Lydia Nsekera (born 20 April 1967) is a Burundian sports official who has been a member of the International Olympic Committee since 2009.

== Career ==
=== Football administration ===
Nsekera was president of the Football Federation of Burundi between 2004 and 2013. In 2012 she was the first woman to be co-opted onto the FIFA Council for one year and in 2013 gained election for a full four-year term, also the first woman to achieve this.

She served through till 2021, when she lost her bid to represent Africa on the council for the third time after serving on the council for 8 years. She lost to her successor Isha Johansen on 12 March 2021 during the CAF General Assembly.

=== Olympics committee ===
She is the president of the Burundi National Olympic Committee (NOC Burundi). She has twice vied for the Association of National Olympic Committees of Africa (ANOCA) but lost on both occasions to Mustapha Berraf. She made it as a point of duty to restore the image of ANOCA when she selected to lead them.

She currently chairs the IOC Women in Sport Commission. She serves on the Los Angeles 2028 coordination commission.
