= Colombian Football Federation =

Governing body of football in Colombia

CONMEBOL
- Founded: 12 October 1924; 101 years ago
- Headquarters: Bogotá
- FIFA affiliation: 14 August 1936
- CONMEBOL affiliation: 14 August 1936
- President: Ramón Jesurún
- Website: www.fcf.com.co

Logo until 2023

The Colombian Football Federation (Spanish: Federación Colombiana de Fútbol; FCF), also known as Colfútbol, is the governing body of football, futsal, and beach soccer in Colombia. The organization was founded on 12 October 1924, and has been affiliated with FIFA since 14 August 1936. It is a member of CONMEBOL and is in charge of the Colombia national football team, the Colombia women's national football team, and all youth and futsal national selections.

The federation's structure comprises two subordinate bodies: the División Mayor del Fútbol Colombiano (Dimayor), which governs professional club football across the Primera and Segunda divisions, as well as the Copa Colombia and the Superliga Colombiana, and the División Aficionada del Fútbol Colombiano (Difutbol), which organises amateur and regional competitions.

The federation's current logo was designed in 1971 by graphic designer Rosalba Chiriví de Gélvez, a graduate of the National University of Colombia, commissioned by then-president Alfonso Senior Quevedo ahead of the 1971 CONMEBOL Pre-Olympic Tournament.

== History ==
=== Foundation ===
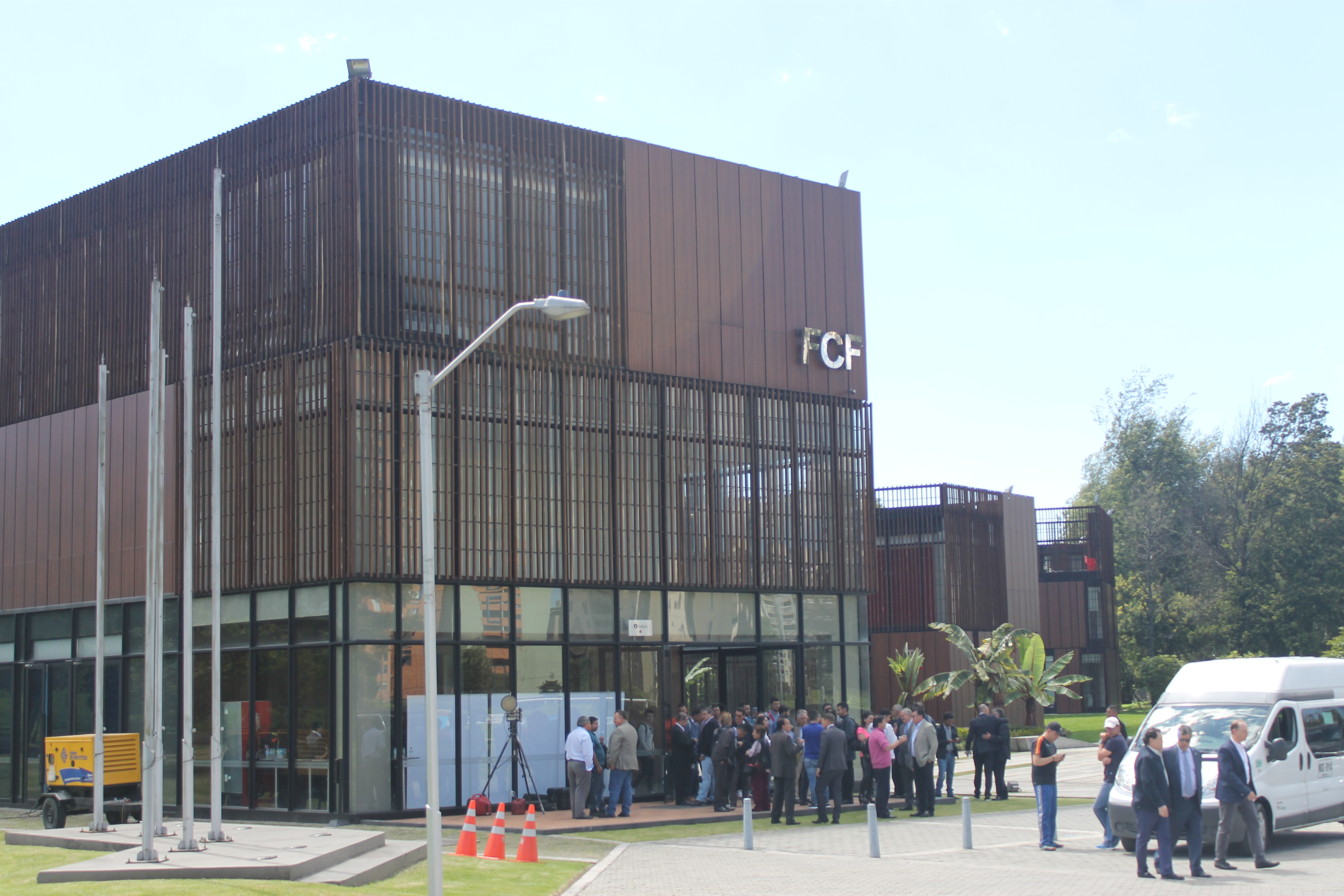
Colombian Football Federation headquarters in Bogotá.

The initiative to create an organised football body was taken in Barranquilla, where the Liga de Football Atlántico was founded on 12 October 1924. The organisation received formal recognition from the national government only in 1927, through Resolution 34 signed by President Miguel Abadía Méndez. Carlos Lafaurie Roncallo, as president of the Liga de Foot-ball del Atlántico, convened an extraordinary assembly in Barranquilla on 8 June 1936 to reform the statutes of the organisation, broadening its membership to include clubs from Santa Marta, Cartagena, and other Caribbean cities.

The organisation was subsequently renamed the Asociación Colombiana de Fútbol (Adefútbol). With national recognition granted by Resolution 72 of 1936, signed by President Alfonso López Pumarejo, Lafaurie submitted the paperwork to FIFA for international recognition. On 14 August 1936, at the FIFA Congress held in Berlin on the occasion of the 1936 Summer Olympics, Colombia's membership was approved in principle. In a letter dated 17 October 1936, FIFA Secretary-General D.J. Schuther informed Adefútbol of its acceptance as a new member.

=== El Dorado and readmission to FIFA ===
The 1940s saw the rise of professional football in Colombia, leading to the creation of the professional league in 1948 and the División Mayor del Fútbol Colombiano (Dimayor). This coincided with strikes by players in other South American countries, particularly Argentina, prompting Colombian clubs to sign foreign stars outside of FIFA's transfer regulations, a period known as El Dorado (from 1949). As a result, Colombian football was suspended from FIFA, accused of "piracy". Colombia was readmitted on 24 October 1951 through the so-called Pacto de Lima, under which it agreed to return foreign players by no later than 15 September 1954.

=== Formation of the FCF ===
In 1958, twelve regional leagues led by Antioquia, Cundinamarca and Valle del Cauca organised a rival national championship and created a body called Codefútbol, but the movement failed to gain traction. Tensions between Adefútbol and Dimayor came to a head in 1961 ahead of the 1962 FIFA World Cup qualifiers; CONMEBOL eventually ruled in December 1961 in favour of Dimayor.

In 1964, while Adefútbol appointed Eduardo Carbonell Insignares as its president, Dimayor and a number of leagues met in Villa del Rosario on 19 June to create the Federación Colombiana de Fútbol (Fedebol), electing Alfonso Senior Quevedo as president. FIFA recognised Fedebol at its 1966 Congress in London, granting it provisional status to reorganise football in Colombia. On 15 June 1971, a general assembly formally established the Federación Colombiana de Fútbol under the acronym Colfútbol, with Eduardo Carbonell Insignares as its first president.

=== 1986 World Cup bid and later decades ===
In 1974, FIFA awarded Colombia the right to host the 1986 FIFA World Cup, but President Belisario Betancur announced in November 1982 that the country would relinquish the hosting rights due to its inability to meet FIFA's infrastructure requirements. In 1987, CONMEBOL presidents agreed to rotate Copa América hosting rights, and Colombia was assigned the 2001 Copa América.

== Facilities ==
The Colombian Football Federation operates three facilities: its administrative and sporting headquarters in Bogotá; the "Casa de las Selecciones Colombia", its national teams training complex in Barranquilla, inaugurated on 13 October 2021; and a third high-performance centre in Cali.

== Past presidents ==
- 1924: Carlos Vicente Quevedo (Adefútbol)
- 1936: Carlos Lafaurie Roncallo
- 1948: Bernardo Jaramillo García
- 1951: Eduardo Carbonell Insignares
- 1957: Efraín Borrero
- 1957: Rafael Fernández
- 1958: Efraín Borrero
- 1961: Pedro Nery López
- 1962: Luis Benedetti Gómez
- 1964: Eduardo Carbonell Insignares
- 1964: Alfonso Senior Quevedo (Fedebol)
- 1971: Eduardo Carbonell Insignares
- 1975: Alfonso Senior Quevedo
- 1982: León Londoño Tamayo
- 1992: Juan José Bellini
- 1995: Hernán Mejía Campuzano (interim)
- 1996: Álvaro Fina Domínguez
- 2002: Óscar Astudillo Palomino
- 2006: Luis Bedoya Giraldo
- 2015–present: Ramón Jesurún Franco

== Executive committee ==
Name	Position	Source
(Colombia) Ramón Jesurún	President	
(Colombia) Álvaro González	Vice President	
(Colombia) Carlos Zuguarla	2nd Vice President	
(Colombia) Andrés Tamayo	General Secretary	
(Colombia) Iván Novella	Technical Director	
(Argentina) Néstor Lorenzo	Head Coach (Men's senior)	
(Colombia) Ángelo Marsiglia	Head Coach (Women's senior)	
(Colombia) Saula Murad	Media/Communications Manager	
(Colombia) Jorge Correa Pastrana	Futsal Coordinator	
(Colombia) Armando Farfán Peña	Chairperson of the Referees Committee	
(Colombia) Imer Machado	Head of the Referees Department	
(Colombia) Juan Restrepo	Referee Coordinator	
