= Maria Sol Muñoz =

Ecuadorian lawyer

- Born: 6 December 1975 (age 50); Ecuador
- Occupation: Lawyer
- Known for: Member of the FIFA Council

Maria Sol Muñoz (born 6 December 1975) is an Ecuadorian lawyer, and a member of the FIFA Council, where she represents the Confederación Sudamericana de Fútbol (Conmebol).

Muñoz was born in Ecuador on 6 December 1975.

Muñoz is the first woman to represent South America before FIFA Council.
