= Giorgos Koumas =

Cypriot football administrator

George Koumas

FIFA Council and UEFA Executive member
- Incumbent
- Assumed office 2010

12th President of CFA
- Incumbent
- Assumed office March 2018
- Preceded by: Costakis Koutsokoumnis

Personal details
- Born: 24 November 1962 (age 63) Paralimi, Cyprus
- Occupation: Member, FIFA Council and UEFA

George Koumas (born 24 November 1962) is a Cypriot football administrator and member of FIFA council.

In March 2018, he was elected president of the Cyprus Football Association. In 2023, he was re-elected for another four years.

== Background ==
Koumas was born in Paralimni, Cyprus. He studied business and hotel management, and joined a business related to sports tourism and television licensing. He served as president of Enosis Neon Paralimini in 2005. He was deputy secretary of the Cyprus Football Association and deputy president of Cyprus Football Association, and an executive committee member in UEFA until 2019, and member of the FIFA council in 2019.

== Controversies ==
In 2018, journalist Fanis Makrides accused Koumas of secretly owning several companies registered in Seychelles and the British Virgin Islands, which Cypriot semi-governmental organisation CYTA allegedly bought television rights from. This is said to have taken place while Koumas held the Deputy President position at the CFA. In 2024, Koumas and the CFA were accused of intervening to suspend an award Makrides was set to receive from the Cyprus Sports Journalists' Union. The award would recognize Makrides' investigation on Koumas' business dealings and potential conflicts of interest.

In 2022, then leader of football of Olympiakos Nicosia, Christoforos Tornaritis made various heavy accusations against Koumas, claiming the CFA choose who they want to be relegated and who they want to win the league every year. Tornaritis was later fined for his statements.

In April 2022, a major sports website in Cyprus, 24sports accused Koumas of corruption and called for him to resign as president of the CFA.

In June 2023, Koumas denied allegations that his group concealed UEFA red notices regarding match fixing.

On 27 September 2023, the Sports Ethics Committee in Cyprus found that Koumas has a conflict of interest as he owns several companies which trade football broadcasting rights. According to the Cypriot law, an individual cannot hold an official position in sports when they have vested business interests in the sport they are serving.

In November 2024, president of Omonia FC, Stavros Papastavrou accused Koumas and the CFA of corruption, highlighting a lack of transparency in fund handling, conflicts of interest in TV rights, biased refereeing, and selective enforcement of financial rules. Papastavrou called for Koumas’ resignation, warning of potential UEFA sanctions if reforms are not made.
