= Alexey Sorokin (football administrator) =

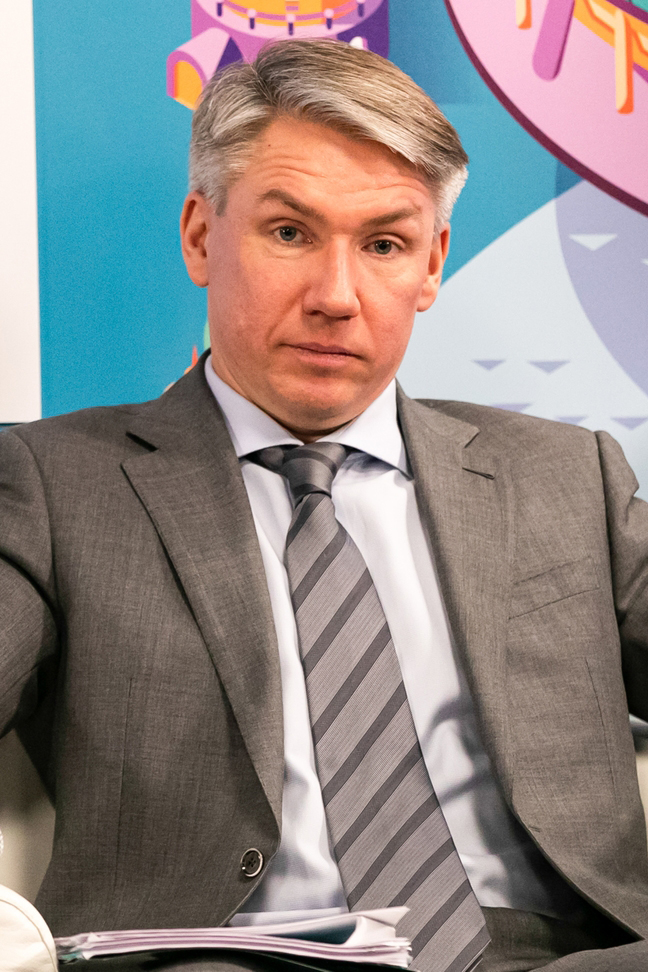
- Born: Alexey Leonidovich Sorokin; 5 April 1972 (age 53); Moscow, Soviet Union
- Occupations: Member, FIFA Council

Alexey Leonidovich Sorokin (Russian: Алексей Леонидович Сорокин; born on 5 April 1972), is a Russian football administrator who was a member of the FIFA Council until 2021. From his previous career, he was the secretary general and general director of the Russian Football Union and helped to organize the UEFA Champions League final in Moscow in 2008. In 2011, he was appointed as the CEO of the Local Organizing Committee for the 2018 FIFA World Cup, after working on the Bid Committee in 2009.

In September 2017, Sorokin was elected to FIFA Council as the Extraordinary UEFA Congress.
