= Johanna Wood =

New Zealand sports administrator (born 1960)

Johanna Wood CNZM
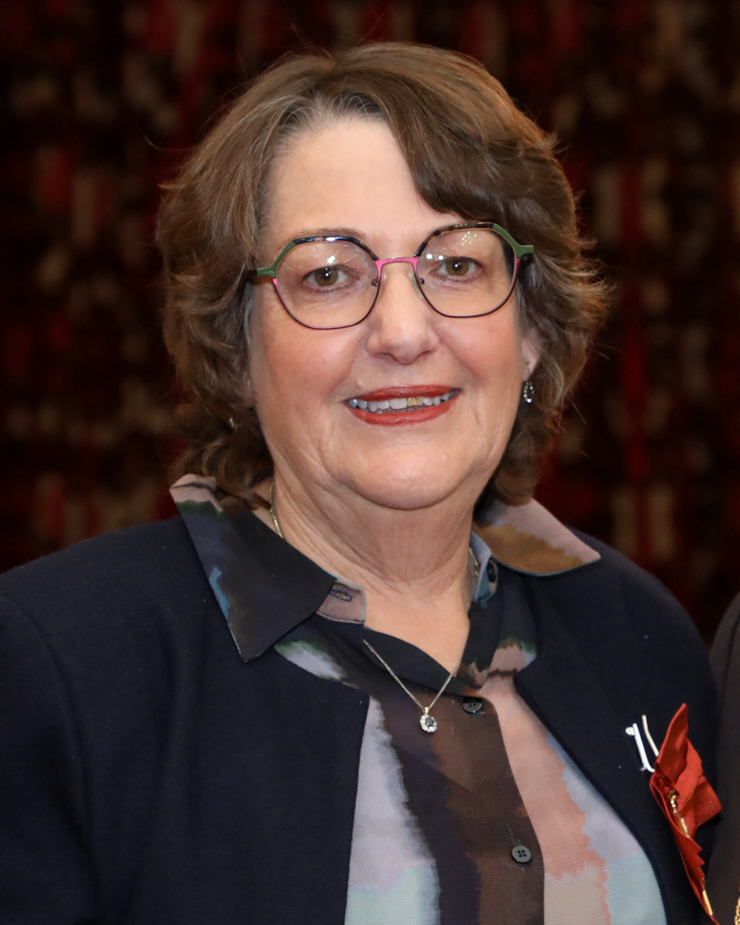
- Wood in 2024
- Born: Johanna Julene Wood; 25 December 1960 (age 65); New Zealand
- Occupations: Member, FIFA Council

Johanna Julene Wood CNZM (born 25 December 1960) is a New Zealand sports administrator; she is president of New Zealand Football.

== Biography ==
Wood was born and grew up in Wellington. She moved to Palmerston North to study German language at Massey University, and met her future husband, a dairy farmer. Wood has a Master of Educational Studies and a PhD in education. On graduating, she lived on the family dairy farm at Hiwinui while beginning her teaching career. Her last position before retiring was principal of Queen Elizabeth College in Palmerston North, a position she held for nine years.

In 2010 Wood was elected chair of the Central Football Federation, covering Manawatū, Hawke's Bay, and Taranaki.

Wood was elected to the FIFA Council during the OFC Extraordinary Congress in Auckland on 9 March 2019, to serve from 2019 to 2023. Wood is the first New Zealander elected to the FIFA Council since Charlie Dempsey, who served from 1996 to 2000.

She is also president of New Zealand Football, and the first woman to hold the position. In 2022 she was re-elected for a second term.

=== Awards and recognition ===
In 2021, Wood was awarded the Sport New Zealand Leadership Award at the Halberg Awards. In the 2024 New Year Honours, Wood was appointed a Companion of the New Zealand Order of Merit (CNZM), for services to football governance.
