= Aki Riihilahti =

Finnish footballer (born 1976)

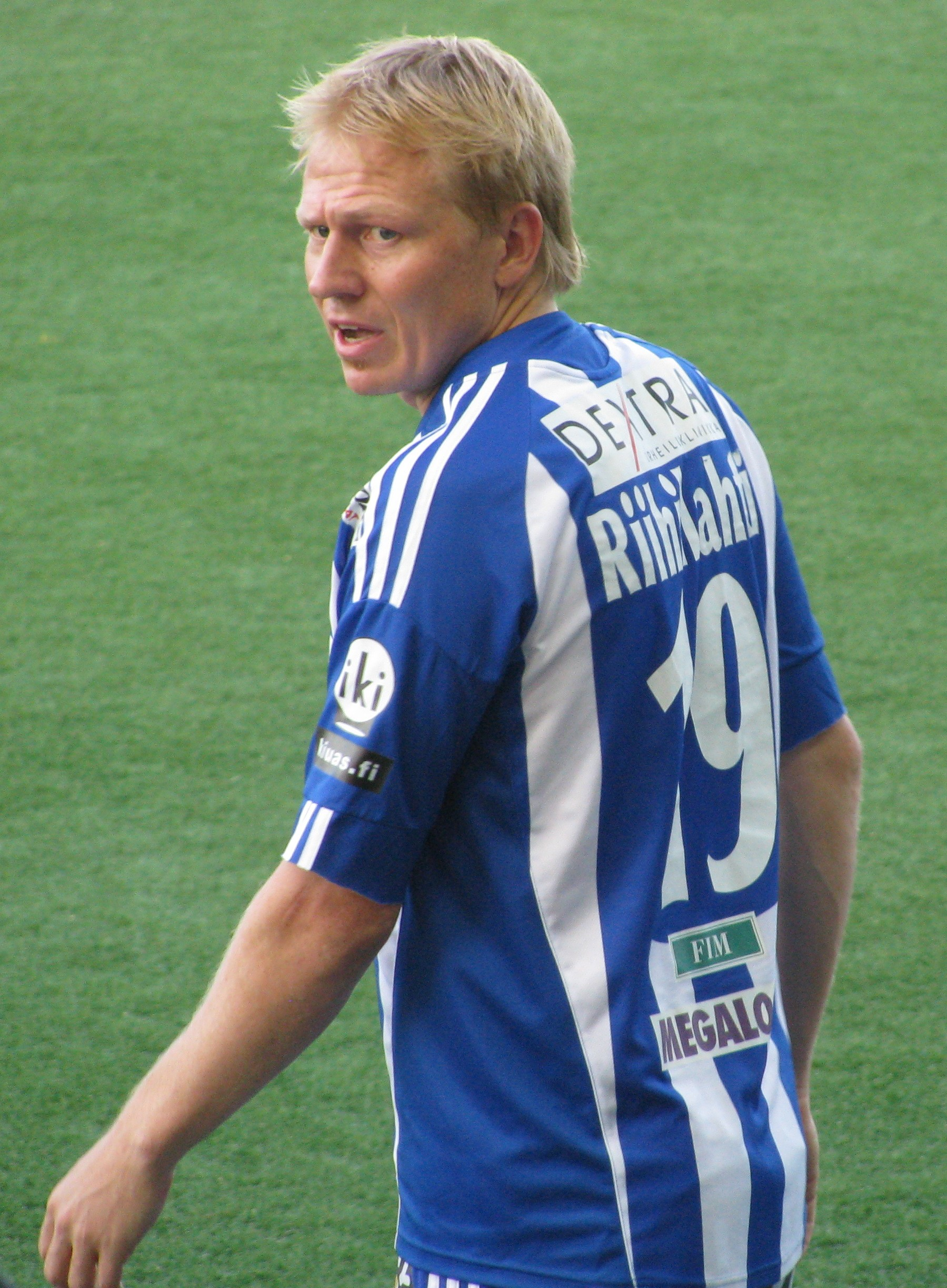
- Riihilahti playing for HJK in 2010

Personal information
- Full name: Aki Pasinpoika Riihilahti
- Date of birth: 9 September 1976 (age 50)
- Place of birth: Helsinki, Finland
- Height: 1.85 m (6 ft 1 in)
- Position: Defensive midfielder

Team information
- Current team: HJK (chief executive officer)

Youth career
- 1982–1994: HJK

Senior career*
Years	Team	Apps	(Gls)
1995–1999	HJK	62	(11)
1996	→ Honka (loan)	3	(0)
1999–2000	Vålerenga	51	(5)
2001–2006	Crystal Palace	157	(13)
2006–2007	1. FC Kaiserslautern	10	(1)
2007–2009	Djurgården	12	(0)
2009–2011	HJK	40	(6)
Total		301	(33)

International career
1998–2007	Finland	69	(11)

Managerial career
- 2014–: HJK (chief executive officer)
- * Club domestic league appearances and goals

Aki Pasinpoika Riihilahti (born 9 September 1976) is a Finnish sports executive and a former professional footballer. He played as a defensive midfielder. He is the CEO of HJK Helsinki. He was voted by leading European clubs to be the vice-chairman of European Club Association (ECA), and has also important positions both in the UEFA club competition committee and in the FIFA stakeholders committee.

== Club career ==
Riihilahti started his career at HJK where he made his Veikkausliiga debut in 1995. He has won the Finnish championship four times (1997, 2009, 2010 and 2011), the Finnish Cup three times with HJK, and the Finnish League Cup three times, and played a vital part when the first and so far only time a Finnish Club team qualified for the UEFA Champions League in the 1998–99 season. After his first spell in HJK, Riihilahti moved to Norway's Vålerenga I.F. for the 1999 season.

After two seasons in Norway, he joined England's Crystal Palace in 2001, eventually becoming a fans' favourite at the club. In Palace's 2004–05 Premier League season he showed he has what it takes to play in one of Europe's top leagues. Riihilahti was so loved by the Crystal Palace faithful that a Finnish flag with the legend 'AKI 15' across the centre was hung behind one of the Selhurst Park goals for the entire Premier League season. However, his next season, back in the Championship, following Palace's relegation, was not so successful because injuries limited his chances. Despite not playing for most of his last season with Palace, Riihilahti has a place in the club Hall of Fame as he held the club record for gaining the most caps for his country whilst at Palace.

After his contract with Palace expired in the summer of 2006, Riihilahti was picked up by 1. FC Kaiserslautern on a one-year deal. In June 2007, Riihilahti signed a two-and-a-half-year deal with Stockholm club Djurgårdens IF and on 31 July 2009 returned to Finland to sign with HJK in which he has made a crucial contribution in the club's record 5 consecutive championships 2009–2013. On 29 October 2011, Riihilahti celebrated his 100th league match for HJK by scoring once, in the last match of the season, in a 5–2 home win against Haka, and retired after the club won a convincing double that season.

== International career ==
Riihilahti made his debut for the Finnish national team on 5 February 1998 against Cyprus. He was a regular for Finland for most of the 2000s, and earned 69 caps scoring 11 goals. He is part of the Finnish Golden generation in football, but mainly due to his work as football director at International level he has become one of the most well-known Finnish football person.

== Administrative career ==
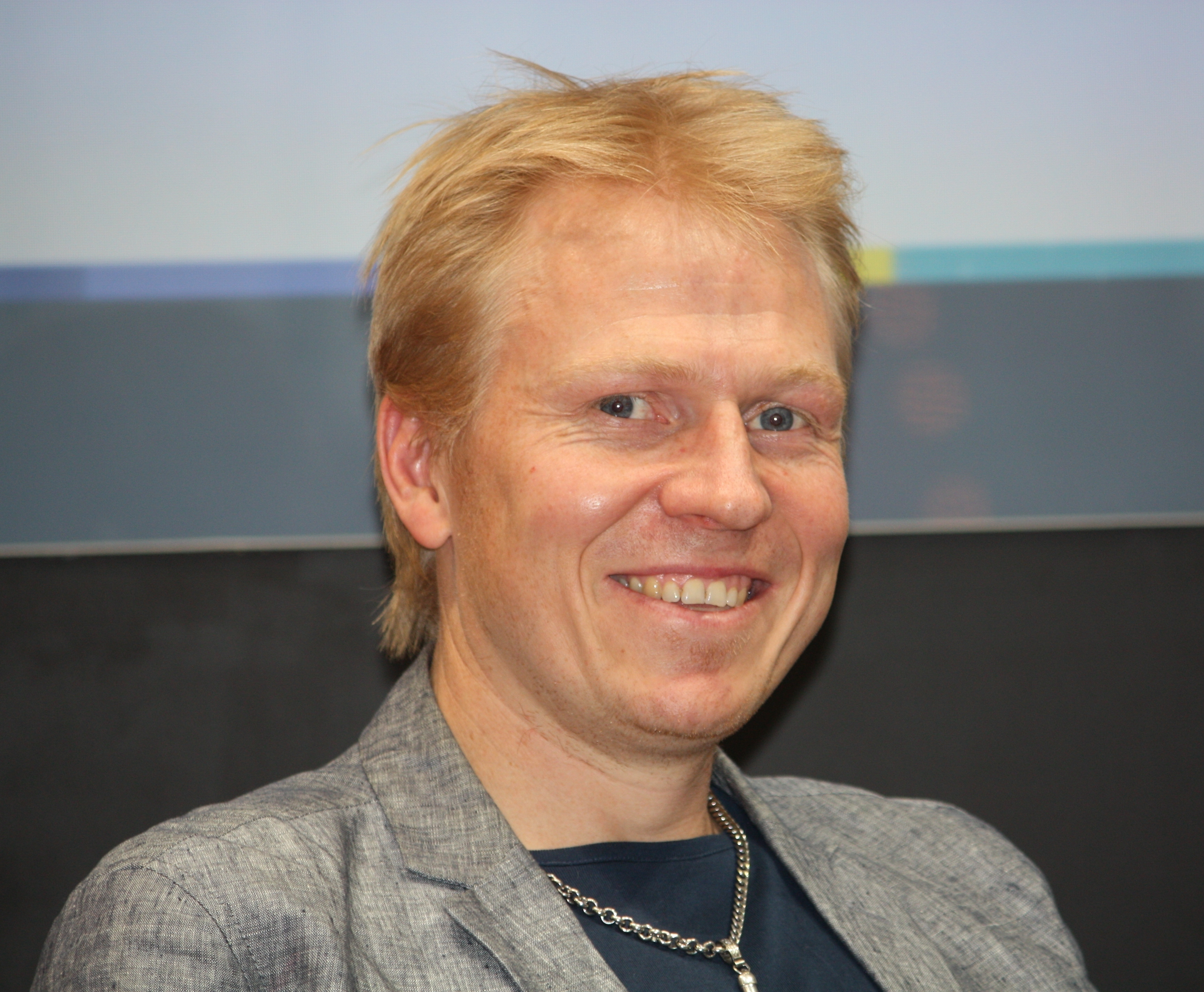
Riihilahti at the Helsinki Book Fair in 2011

Riihilahti has worked as the CEO of HJK Helsinki's stadium Bolt Arena since 2011 and as the CEO of HJK Helsinki since 2013. He graduated from the MBA program of University of Liverpool in 2011 and has done some studies in Harvard University and Yale University as well.

Riihilahti had a key role in establishment of the UEFA Europa Conference League which started during the 2021-2022 season.

== Personal life ==
During his career Riihilahti has written columns for newspapers, such as The Times and the Finnish Iltalehti.

He has been involved in charity projects like ’'Icehearts and ’'Peace United.

Apart from his careers in sports and media he has been involved in many high profile political and business committees. Riihilahti divorced 2019. Riihilahti married his Tanssii Tähtien kanssa-dance partner, Katri Mäkinen in 2023. Katri gave birth to her first (Aki's 3rd) child on 2 September 2024.

He is the older brother of Finnish TV and sports reporter Riku Riihilahti, and the uncle of professional footballer Daniel Riihilahti, playing in Brann II.

== Career statistics ==
=== Club ===
As of 31 December 2020

Appearances and goals by club, season and competition
Club	Season	League			National cup (Note: Includes Suomen Cup, FA Cup, DFB-Pokal and Svenska Cupen)		League cup (Note: Includes EFL League Cup and Finnish League Cup)		Continental		Total	
Club	Season	Division	Apps	Goals	Apps	Goals	Apps	Goals	Apps	Goals	Apps	Goals
HJK	1995	Veikkausliiga	6	0	0	0	0	0	2 (Note: Includes UEFA Intertoto Cup)	0	8	0
HJK	1996	Veikkausliiga	3	1	0	0	0	0	3 (Note: Includes UEFA Cup)	0	6	1
HJK	1997	Veikkausliiga	26	6	0	0	0	0	2 (Note: Includes UEFA Cup Winners' Cup)	0	28	6
HJK	1998	Veikkausliiga	27	4	0	0	0	0	9 (Note: Includes UEFA Champions League)	1	36	5
HJK	Total		62	11	0	0	0	0	16	1	78	12
Honka (loan)	1996	Ykkönen	3	0	—		—		—		3	0
Vålerenga	1999	Tippeligaen	25	5	0	0	—		1	0	26	5
Vålerenga	2000	Tippeligaen	26	0	—		—		—		26	0
Vålerenga	Total		51	5	0	0	0	0	1	0	52	5
Crystal Palace	2000–01	First Division	9	1	—		—		—		9	1
Crystal Palace	2001–02	First Division	45	5	1	0	2	1	—		48	6
Crystal Palace	2002–03	First Division	25	1	2	0	3	0	—		30	1
Crystal Palace	2003–04	First Division	31	0	0	0	4	0	—		35	0
Crystal Palace	2004–05	Premier League	31	4	0	0	0	0	—		31	4
Crystal Palace	2005–06	Championship	15	2	3	0	2	0	—		20	2
Crystal Palace	Total		157	13	6	0	11	1	0	0	174	14
1. FC Kaiserslautern	2006–07	2. Bundesliga	10	1	1	0	—		—		11	1
1. FC Kaiserslautern II	2006–07	Regionalliga Süd	1	0	—		—		—		1	0
Djurgården	2007	Allsvenskan	10	0	—		—		—		10	0
Djurgården	2008	Allsvenskan	2	0	1	0	—		—		3	0
Djurgården	Total		12	0	1	0	0	0	0	0	13	0
HJK Helsinki	2009	Veikkausliiga	10	3	1	0	0	0	—		11	3
HJK Helsinki	2010	Veikkausliiga	11	0	2	0	0	0	4	0	17	0
HJK Helsinki	2011	Veikkausliiga	19	3	2	0	1	0	6 (Note: Includes UEFA Champions League and UEFA Europa League)	0	28	3
HJK Helsinki	Total		40	6	5	0	1	0	10	0	56	6
Klubi 04	2013	Kakkonen	1	0	—		—		—		1	0
Career total			337	36	13	0	12	1	27	1	389	38

=== International ===
Appearances and goals by national team and year
National team	Year	Apps	Goals
Finland	1998	9	1
Finland	1999	8	0
Finland	2000	5	1
Finland	2001	12	4
Finland	2002	7	1
Finland	2003	8	1
Finland	2004	7	1
Finland	2005	6	1
Finland	2006	4	1
Finland	2007	3	0
Total		69	11

Finland score listed first, score column indicates score after each Riihilahti goal.

List of international goals scored by Aki Riihilahti
No.	Date	Venue	Opponent	Score	Result	Competition
1	25 March 1998	Ta' Qali National Stadium, Ta' Qali, Malta	Malta	1–0	2–0	Friendly
2	2 September 2000	Helsinki Olympic Stadium, Helsinki, Finland	Albania	2–1	2–1	2002 FIFA World Cup qualification
3	15 February 2001	Al-Sadaqua Walsalam Stadium, Kuwait City, Kuwait	Kuwait	3–4	3–4	Friendly
4	18 February 2001	Sultan Qaboos Sports Complex, Muscat, Oman	Oman	2–0	2–1	Friendly
5	24 March 2001	Anfield, Liverpool, England	England	1–0	1–2	2002 FIFA World Cup qualification
6	5 September 2001	Helsinki Olympic Stadium, Helsinki, Finland	Greece	2–0	5–1	2002 FIFA World Cup qualification
7	22 May 2002	Helsinki Olympic Stadium, Helsinki, Finland	Latvia	1–1	2–1	Friendly
8	20 August 2003	Parken, Copenhagen, Denmark	Denmark	1–1	1–1	Friendly
9	4 September 2004	Helsinki Olympic Stadium, Helsinki, Finland	Andorra	2–0	3–0	2006 FIFA World Cup qualification
10	26 March 2005	Na Stínadlech, Teplice, Czechia	Czech Republic	3–2	3–4	2006 FIFA World Cup qualification
11	1 March 2006	Pafiako Stadium, Pafos, Cyprus	Belarus	1–2	2–2	Friendly

== Honours ==
HJK Helsinki

- Veikkausliiga: 1997, 2009, 2010, 2011
- Finnish Cup: 1996, 1998, 2011
- Finnish League Cup: 1996, 1997, 1998

Crystal Palace

- Football League First Division play-offs: 2004
