= Rajesh Patel =

Fijian association football official (born 1961)

President of the Fiji Football Association
- Incumbent
- Assumed office 2016

Senior Vice President of the Oceania Football Confederation
- Incumbent
- Assumed office 2018

Member of the FIFA Council
- Incumbent
- Assumed office March 2019

Personal details
- Born: 3 April 1961 (age 65) Fiji
- Occupation: Sports administrator, FIFA executive member

Rajesh Patel, MOF (born on 3 April 1961) is a member of FIFA Council and senior vice-president of the Oceania Football Confederation. He is presently elected as the president of Fiji Football Association.

He has been the first sport administrator from Fiji to be elected as a member in the FIFA Council.

== FIFA council member election ==
Patel was elected as a member in the FIFA council on 9 March 2019 during the Oceania Football Confederation Extraordinary Congress held in Auckland, New Zealand and before he was elected in the FIFA board, he has been among the members that helps in introducing a seven-year plan intended for qualification of 2026 FIFA World Cup for Fiji and had introduce the fully domestic professional football league in Fiji.

== Award ==
Patel's commitment to the service of football development in the country led him to receive an award of a service worthy for a particular recognition the Medal of the Order of Fiji by President Jioji Konrote at the Investiture Ceremony at State House.
