= Ramón Jesurún =

Colombian football official

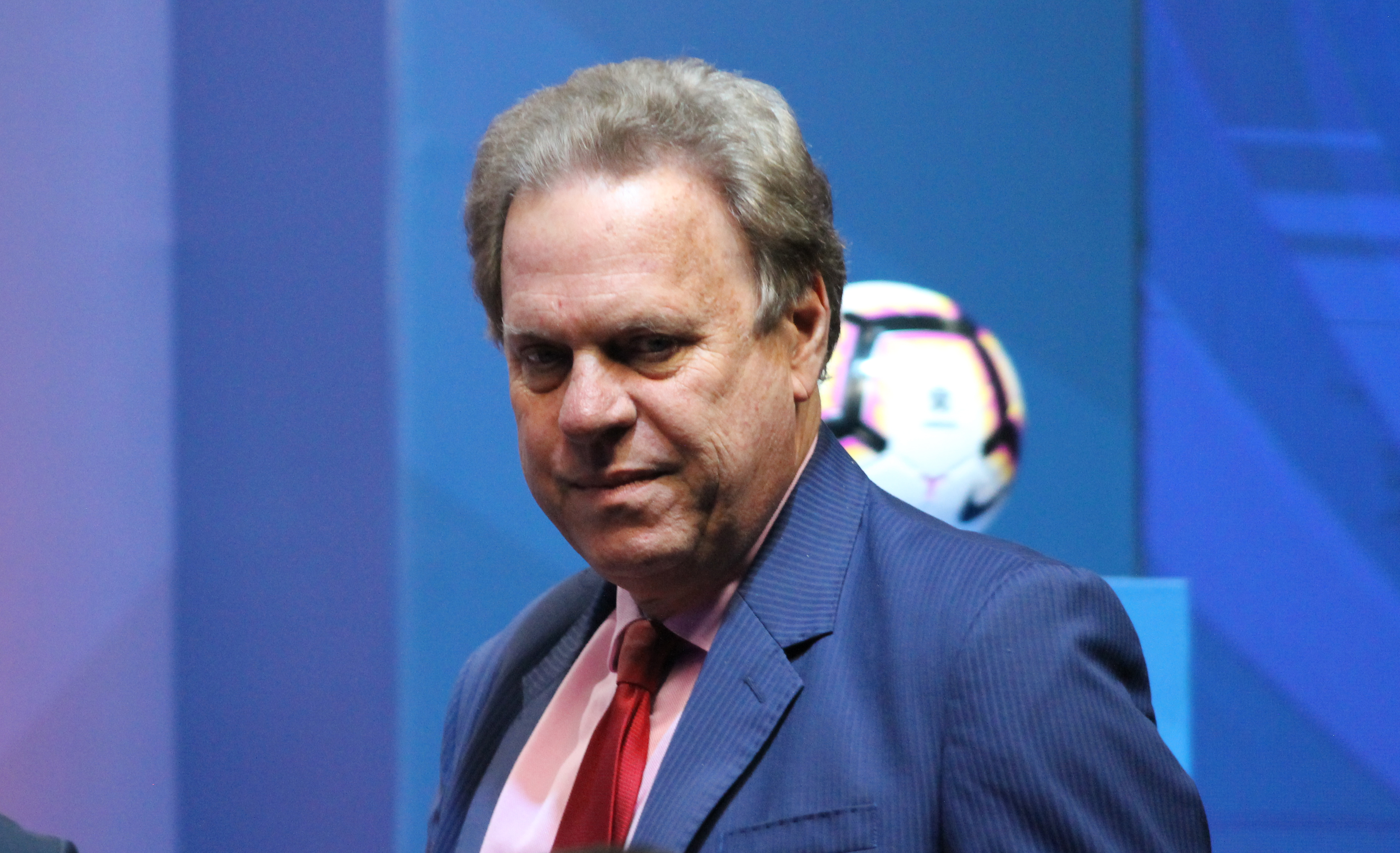
- Jesurún in 2019
- Born: Ramón Jesurún Franco; 30 November 1952 (age 73); Barranquilla, Colombia
- Known for: Member of the FIFA Council

Ramón Jesurún Franco (born 30 November 1952) is a Colombian football official.

== Career ==
From 2006 to 2015, Jesurún served as President of the Colombian Dimayor, which runs Colombian professional football.

He is the current 1st Vice President of the South American Football Confederation (CONMEBOL).

Since November 2015, he has been the President of the Colombian Football Federation (FCF).

Since 2016, he has been a member of the FIFA Council.

=== Copa América 2024 ===
On July 14, 2024, Jesurún and his son Ramón Jamil Jesurún were among 27 people arrested outside the Copa America final at the Hard Rock Stadium in Miami Gardens, Florida. The two were accused of fighting security guards as fans overflowed the arena. The Miami-Dade Police Department charged Jesurún and his son with three counts of battery on a specified official/employee, who was later identified as security supervisor Jakari Shaw. The Colombian Football Federation issued an apology in a statement on July 16 that said that Jesurún deeply regrets what happened. The charges against the elder Jesurún were dropped on August 26.
