= Gabriele Galateri di Genola =

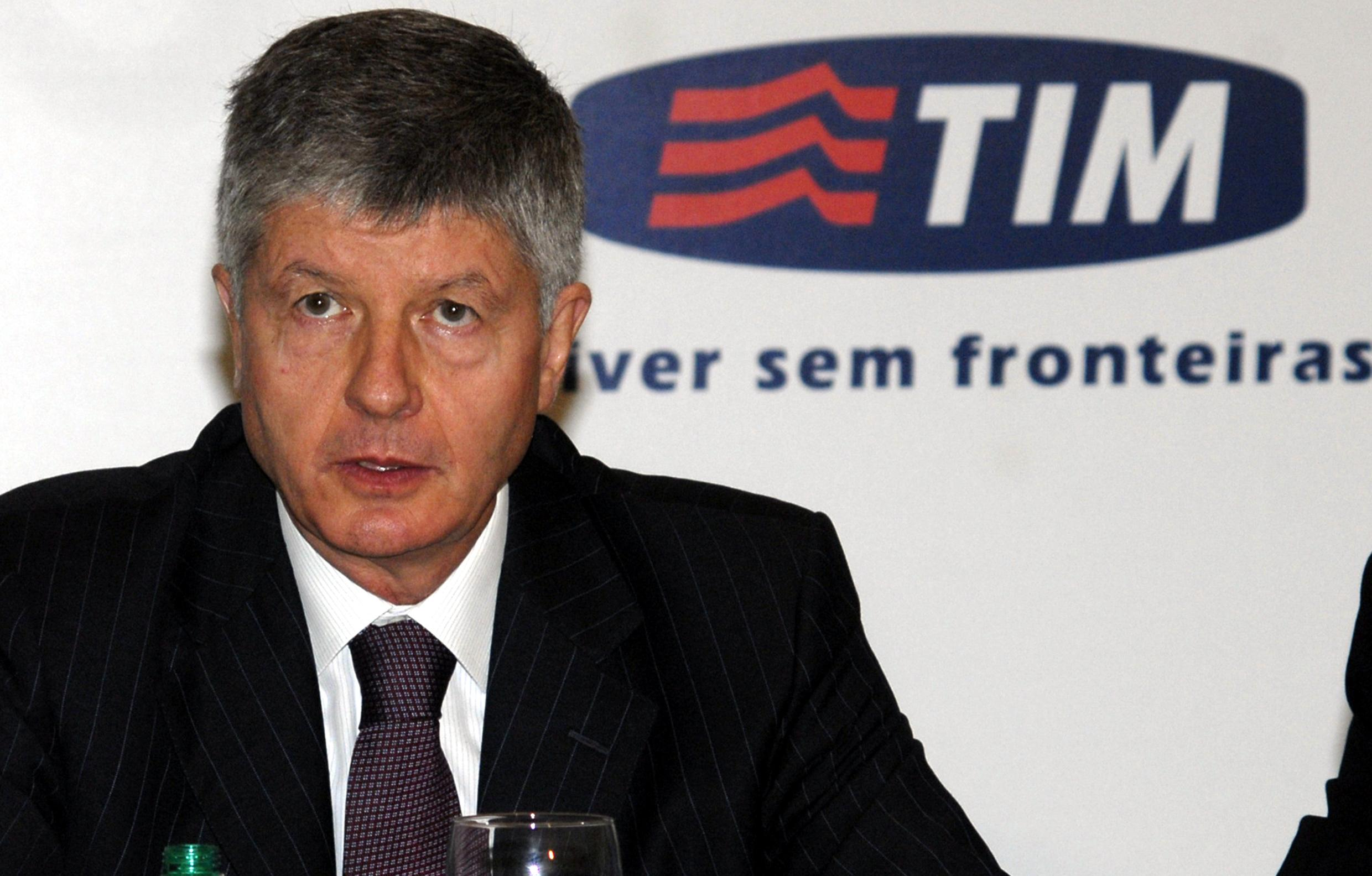
Gabriele Galateri di Genola

Gabriele Galateri di Genola (born 1947) is the Generali Group chairman. He is the former the chairman of the board of Telecom Italia, CEO of Fiat and former chairman of Mediobanca.

== Early life ==
Di Genola was born in Rome in 1947. He graduated with a law degree from the University of Rome and he earned his MBA from Columbia Business School.

== Career ==
Following graduation in 1971, di Genola began his career at Banco di Roma in 1972 as head of financial analysis, before being appointed to manage the firm’s international loans office. In 1977, he joined Fiat where he was tasked with managing various departments before his eventual promotion to director of finance.

In 2002, Di Genola was appointed CEO of Fiat. From 2003 to 2007 he was chairman of Mediobanca, where he restructured the firm after many years of poor performance. In 2008, he became the chairman of Telecom Italia. As of September 2020, he is a member of the Italian Aspen Institute.

== Other activities ==
- European Financial Services Roundtable (EFR), member
- Temasek Holdings, Member of the European Advisory Panel (since 2016)

== Philanthropy ==
Di Genola is heavily involved in philanthropic activities for Piedmont Cancer Centre; the Arco Foundation, which supports drug addicts; and the Eduardo Agnelli Foundation, a charity supporting disadvantaged people.

== Recognition ==
In 1999, Di Genola was awarded the Order of Merit for “his incessant work on Italy’s financial stage”, and he was made a Knight of the National Order of the Legion of Honour in 2007.
