= FIFA Council =

Decision-making institution of FIFA

- Headquarters: Zürich, Switzerland
- Official language: English, French, Spanish, German
- Secretary General: Mattias Grafström
- President: Gianni Infantino
- Senior Vice President: Salman Ibrahim Al Khalifa
- Website: www.fifa.com/about-fifa/organisation/fifa-council
- Formerly called: FIFA Executive Committee (1974–2016)

The FIFA Council (formerly the FIFA Executive Committee) is an institution of FIFA (the governing body of association football, futsal and beach football). It is the main decision-making body of the organization in the intervals of FIFA Congress. Its members are elected by the FIFA Congress. The council is a non-executive, supervisory and strategic body that sets the vision for FIFA and global football.

== New FIFA Council ==
Following the 2016 FIFA Extraordinary Congress, FIFA announced that a new set of statutes would come into force. These changes have seen the FIFA Executive Committee changed, to become the FIFA Council, with a new structure, and more power. It is led by the president of FIFA. It has also been announced that the Secretary General will now report to the council, and will work with a Chief Compliance Officer, who monitors the organisation in their work. All existing members of the committee remained in role until their respective positions faced re-election at their respective confederations. The new members of the FIFA Council came into force on 30 September 2016. There is a total of 37 new members on the council. It came into force before the 2016 Ordinary FIFA congress.

The new council will be made up of the following individuals:

- The President
- CONMEBOL: one vice-president and four members
- AFC: one vice-president and six members
- UEFA: three vice-presidents and six members
- CAF: one vice-president and six members
- CONCACAF: one vice-president and four members
- OFC: one vice-president and two members

== Membership ==
FIFA Council
President
Gianni Infantino; Switzerland / Italy / Lebanon
Vice presidents
| AFC (Asia) | UEFA (Europe) | CAF (Africa) | CONCACAF (North America) | CONMEBOL (South America) | OFC (Oceania) |
| Salman Bin Ibrahim Al-Khalifa; Bahrain; Senior | Aleksander Čeferin; Slovenia | Patrice Motsepe; South Africa | Victor Montagliani; Canada | Alejandro Domínguez; Paraguay | Lambert Maltock; Vanuatu |
| Salman Bin Ibrahim Al-Khalifa; Bahrain; Senior | Sándor Csányi; Hungary | Patrice Motsepe; South Africa | Victor Montagliani; Canada | Alejandro Domínguez; Paraguay | Lambert Maltock; Vanuatu |
| Salman Bin Ibrahim Al-Khalifa; Bahrain; Senior | Debbie Hewitt; England | Patrice Motsepe; South Africa | Victor Montagliani; Canada | Alejandro Domínguez; Paraguay | Lambert Maltock; Vanuatu |
Members
| AFC (Asia) | UEFA (Europe) | CAF (Africa) | CONCACAF (North America) | CONMEBOL (South America) | OFC (Oceania) |
| Hamad Bin Khalifa Bin Ahmed Al-Thani; Qatar | Pascale Van Damme; Belgium | Hany Abo Rida; Egypt | Sonia Bien-Aime; Turks and Caicos Islands | Ramón Jesurún; Colombia | Rajesh Patel; Fiji |
| Yasser Al Misehal; Saudi Arabia | Bernd Neuendorf; Germany | Fouzi Lekjaa; Morocco | Rodolfo Villalobos; Costa Rica | Maria Sol Muñoz; Ecuador | Johanna Wood; New Zealand |
| Mariano Araneta; Philippines | Giorgos Koumas; Cyprus | Djibrilla Hima Hamidou; Niger | Cindy Parlow Cone; United States | Claudio Tapia; Argentina | |
| Kanya Keomany; Laos | Fernando Gomes; Portugal | Ahmed Yahya; Mauritania | Randy Harris; Barbados | Ignacio Alonso; Uruguay | |
| Datuk Haji Hamidin Bin Haji Mohd Amin; Malaysia | Dejan Savićević; Montenegro | Suleiman Waberi; Djibouti | | | |
| Kozo Tashima; Japan | Răzvan Burleanu; Romania | Kanizat Ibrahim; Comoros | | | |
Secretary General
Mattias Grafström; Sweden

== Former structure ==
The executive committee consisted of a president, elected by the Congress in the year following a FIFA World Cup, eight vice-presidents and 15 members, appointed by the confederations and associations, and one female member elected by the Congress. In addition to that, in 2013 two more women were co-opted into the executive committee for a period of one year by the Congress, and again in 2014.

The term of office is four years. After those four years, the members as well as the vice-presidents can be re-appointed by their confederations and associations and re-installed by the Congress for another four-year period. Also the President can be re-elected by the congress. Each member has one vote in the committee, including the President, who has, however, a casting vote if the original vote is a draw. All members of the executive committee, after having been chosen by the Congress, can only be removed from their position, if either the Congress or the confederation to which the member belongs, decides that a change of personnel is necessary. For each country's football association only one member can serve on the Execute Committee. Should the President be temporarily or permanently impeded to fulfill his role, the most senior vice-president takes over his responsibilities until a new president can be elected by the Congress.

All candidates for the executive committee should not be delegates for their associations. All members must pass an integrity check before they can be elected. The integrity checks for the vice-presidents and other members of the executive committee are conducted by their own confederations. The President, the female member of the executive committee, all members of the judicial bodies as well as those of the FIFA Audit and Compliance Committee are checked by the investigatory chamber of the FIFA Ethics Committee. Before a member can be re-elected, another integrity check must be conducted.

It meets at least twice a year, with the mandate for each member lasting four years, and its role includes determining the dates, locations and format of tournaments, appointing FIFA delegates to the IFAB and electing and dismissing the General Secretary on the proposal of the FIFA President. Between 1947 and 2013, officially one of the vice-presidents had to be from one of the British associations. This guaranteed position was officially removed by FIFA in 2013 but unofficially maintained by UEFA only nominating British candidates for any vacancies. It is made up of the following representatives:

- The President
- The Secretary General
- CONMEBOL: one vice-president and two members
- AFC: one vice-president and three members
- UEFA: two vice-presidents and five members
- CAF: one vice-president and three members
- CONCACAF: one vice-president and two members
- OFC: one vice-president
- Member for special tasks

The FIFA ExCo met for the final time on 18 March 2016.

== History ==
György Szepesi was FIFA Executive Committee Chairman from 1982 to 1994.

=== Corruption ===
In November 2010, two Executive members, Reynald Temarii and Amos Adamu, were banned for one and three years respectively. Temarii was also fined 5,000 Swiss Francs, while Adamu was fined 10,000 Swiss Francs. Temarii had been found breaching FIFA's code of confidentiality in a sting by The Sunday Times, while in the same sting Amos Adamu was found to have tried to sell his vote for the host of the 2018/2022 FIFA World Cups. The number of Exco members for the 2 December vote was thus reduced from 24 to 22, and the winning vote requirement from 13 to 12. FIFA, however, have not ruled out the possibility of replacing Adamu and Temarii.

On 25 May 2011, Exco member Chuck Blazer reported fellow members Mohammed bin Hammam and Jack Warner to FIFA Ethics Committee claiming they offered bribes to members of the Caribbean Football Union at a meeting on 10/11 May. Bin Hammam involved Sepp Blatter in the scandal claiming he knew about the alleged cash payments. As a result of this scandal, bin Hammam stood down from the June 2011 presidential election and FIFA later suspended both he and Jack Warner. Sepp Blatter stood unopposed and won the election with 186 out of 203 votes.

On 31 May 2011, in an interview with German press, when asked about who he voted for to receive the 2018 and 2022 World Cup hosting rights FIFA senior vice-president Julio Grondona said, "Yes, I voted for Qatar, because a vote for the US would be like a vote for England, and that is not possible [...] But with the English bid I said: Let us be brief. If you give back the Falkland Islands, which belong to us, you will get my vote. They then became sad and left."

On 27 May 2015, fourteen top football officials – including executive committee members – were arrested in Switzerland on corruption charges. Executives Webb, Warner, and Figueredo as well as Eduardo Li, Julio Rocha, Costas Takkas, Rafael Esquivel, José Maria Marin, and Nicolás Leoz all faced extradition to the United States for violation of federal law.

Following the 2015 FIFA corruption case, newly elected British FIFA Vice-president and executive committee board member David Gill threatened to resign his role if Sepp Blatter was re-elected as FIFA President for a fifth term in protest at his leadership. Blatter was re-elected, and Gill immediately rejected the position in protest, stating he would not serve in any capacity under a Blatter regime. Four days later, Blatter abruptly announced he would be stepping down, and Gill said he would "reconsider" his decision to quit in light of the development. Gill had not yet formally resigned.

== See also ==
- FIFA Football Stakeholders Committee
