= UEFA Euro 2004 qualifying =

Tournament details
- Dates: 7 September 2002 – 19 November 2003
- Teams: 50

Tournament statistics
- Matches played: 211 (Note: The matches tally takes into account fixtures that were subsequently abandoned.)
- Goals scored: 566 (2.68 per match)
- Top scorer: (Slovenia) Ermin Šiljak (9 goals)

Qualification for the 2004 UEFA European Championship took place between September 2002 and November 2003.

Fifty teams were divided into ten groups, with each team playing the others in their group twice, once at home and once away. The top team in each group automatically qualified for Euro 2004, and the ten group runners-up were paired off against each other to determine another five places in the finals.

Portugal qualified automatically as hosts of the event.

== Qualified teams ==
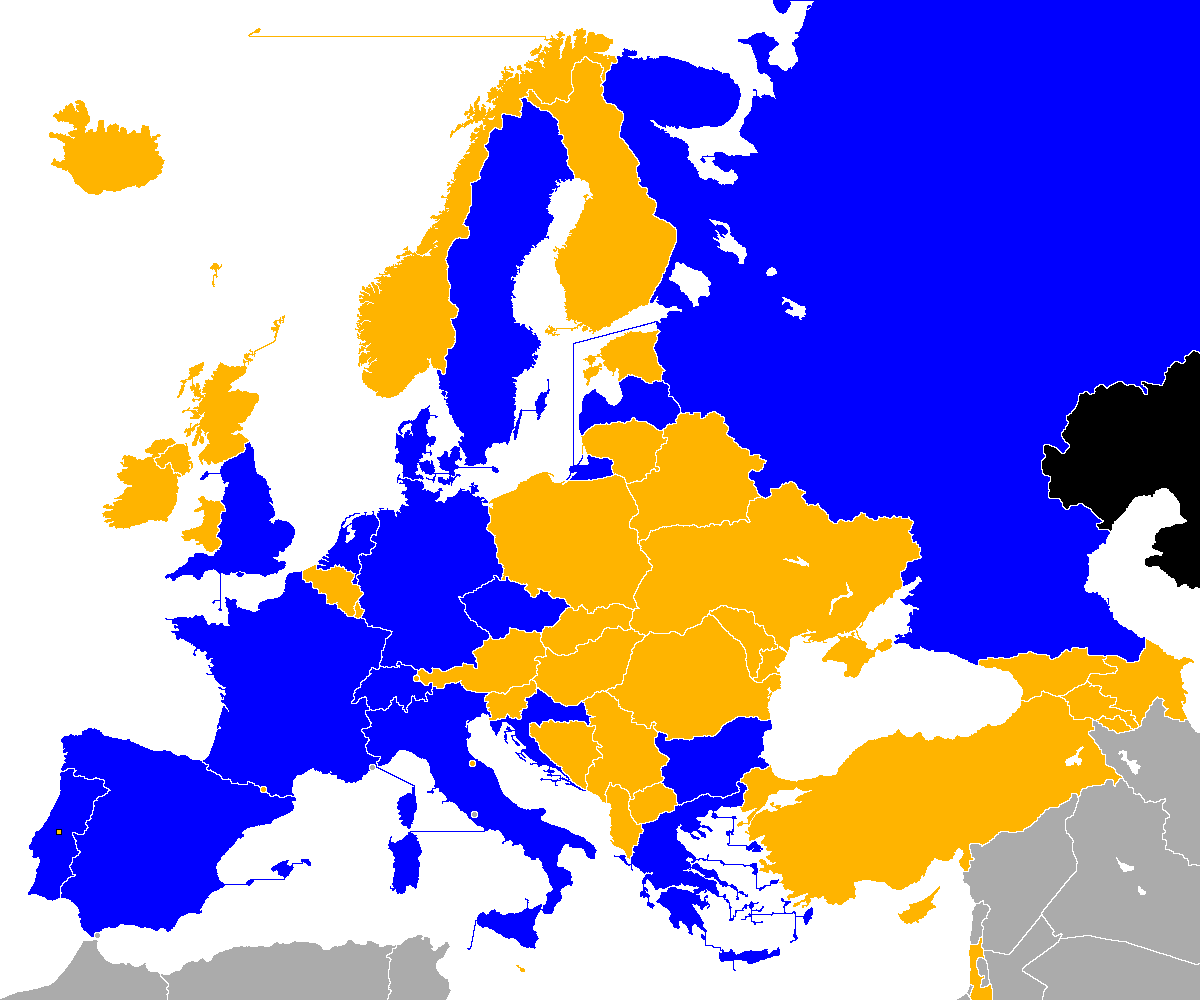
Qualified Did not qualify Did not enter Not a UEFA member

Team	Qualified as	Qualified on	Previous appearances in tournament (Note: Bold indicates champion for that year. Italic indicates host for that year.)
Portugal	Host	12 October 1999	3 (1984, 1996, 2000)
France	Group 1 winner	10 September 2003	5 (1960, **1984**, 1992, 1996, **2000**)
Czech Republic (Note: From 1960 to 1980, the Czech Republic competed as Czechoslovakia.)	Group 3 winner	10 September 2003	5 (1960, **1976**, 1980, 1996, 2000)
Sweden	Group 4 winner	10 September 2003	2 (1992, 2000)
Bulgaria	Group 8 winner	10 September 2003	1 (1996)
Denmark	Group 2 winner	11 October 2003	6 (1964, 1984, 1988, **1992**, 1996, 2000)
Germany (Note: From 1972 to 1988, Germany competed as West Germany.)	Group 5 winner	11 October 2003	8 (**1972**, 1976, **1980**, 1984, 1988, 1992, **1996**, 2000)
Greece	Group 6 winner	11 October 2003	1 (1980)
England	Group 7 winner	11 October 2003	6 (1968, 1980, 1988, 1992, 1996, 2000)
Italy	Group 9 winner	11 October 2003	5 (**1968**, 1980, 1988, 1996, 2000)
Switzerland	Group 10 winner	11 October 2003	1 (1996)
Croatia	Play-off winner	19 November 2003	1 (1996)
Latvia	Play-off winner	19 November 2003	0 (debut)
Netherlands	Play-off winner	19 November 2003	6 (1976, 1980, **1988**, 1992, 1996, 2000)
Spain	Play-off winner	19 November 2003	6 (**1964**, 1980, 1984, 1988, 1996, 2000)
Russia (Note: From 1960 to 1988, Russia competed as the Soviet Union, and in 1992 as CIS.)	Play-off winner	19 November 2003	7 (**1960**, 1964, 1968, 1972, 1988, 1992, 1996)

== Tiebreakers ==
If two or more teams were equal on points on completion of the group matches, the following criteria were applied to determine the rankings:

1. Higher number of points obtained in the group matches played among the teams in question.
2. Superior goal difference from the group matches played among the teams in question.
3. Higher number of goals scored in the group matches played among the teams in question.
4. Higher number of goals scored away from home in the group matches played among the teams in question.
5. If two or more teams still had an equal ranking, criteria 1) to 4) would be reapplied. If this procedure did not lead to a decision, criteria 6) and 7) would apply.
6. Results of all group matches: 1. Superior goal difference 2. Higher number of goals scored 3. Higher number of goals scored away from home 4. Fair play conduct.
7. Drawing of lots.

== Seedings ==
The draw occurred on 25 January 2002 in Santa Maria da Feira, Portugal. 50 teams were divided into five drawing pots based on the latest 2001-edition of the UEFA National Team Coefficient ranking, that had calculated an average of the team's points per game achieved combined in the Euro 2000 qualifiers and 2002 World Cup qualifiers. The seeding list was however subject to some few minor modifications:

- France (ranked 11) were seeded first as the defending champions (title holders). Consequently, all teams ranked above them from 1 to 10 moved down one seeding place lower than their rankings.
- Portugal (ranked 4) was not seeded, as they did not participate in the qualifying tournament due to already having qualified automatically for the final tournament as hosts. Consequently, all teams ranked below them moved up one seeding place higher than their ranking position.

Ten groups were formed by drawing one team from each of the five pots.

Pot A
Team	Coeff	Seed
France (TH)	2,10	1
Sweden	2,67	2
Spain	2,56	3
Czech Republic	2,50	4
Germany	2,25	5
Republic of Ireland	2,22	6
Romania	2,22	7
Italy	2,19	8
Belgium	2,12	9
Turkey	2,11	10

Pot B
Team	Coeff	Seed
Russia	2,10	11
Croatia	2,06	12
FR Yugoslavia	2,00	13
Netherlands	2,00	14
Denmark	2,00	15
Poland	1,89	16
England	1,88	17
Ukraine	1,85	18
Slovenia	1,85	19
Scotland	1,83	20

Pot C
Team	Coeff	Seed
Norway	1,75	21
Austria	1,75	22
Slovakia	1,70	23
Israel	1,56	24
Switzerland	1,55	25
Iceland	1,40	26
Bulgaria	1,39	27
Finland	1,37	28
Greece	1,22	29
Hungary	1,11	30

Pot D
Team	Coeff	Seed
Cyprus	1,11	31
Bosnia and Herzegovina	1,05	32
Belarus	1,00	33
Wales	1,00	34
Estonia	0,95	35
Latvia	0,94	36
Northern Ireland	0,89	37
Macedonia	0,83	38
Georgia	0,83	39
Lithuania	0,72	40

Pot E
Team	Coeff	Seed
Armenia	0,65	41
Albania	0,55	42
Moldova	0,55	43
Faroe Islands	0,50	44
Azerbaijan	0,45	45
Liechtenstein	0,22	46
Malta	0,05	47
San Marino	0,05	48
Luxembourg	0,00	49
Andorra	0,00	50

Note: The UEFA National Team Coefficient ranking automatically had taken into account in its ranking calculation, that some teams only played one of the two preceding qualification tournaments. Since Belgium and Netherlands qualified automatically for UEFA Euro 2000 as co-hosts, the coefficient factored only their 2002 FIFA World Cup qualifying record. France had also qualified automatically for the 2002 FIFA World Cup as 1998 FIFA World Cup Champions, meaning the coefficient used only the UEFA Euro 2000 qualification record for France.

== Summary ==
Group winners qualified directly for UEFA Euro 2004
Group runners-up advanced to the play-offs
Other teams were eliminated after the qualifying group stage

Group 1	Group 2	Group 3	Group 4	Group 5	Group 6	Group 7	Group 8	Group 9	Group 10
France	Denmark	Czech Republic	Sweden	Germany	Greece	England	Bulgaria	Italy	Switzerland
Slovenia	Norway	Netherlands	Latvia	Scotland	Spain	Turkey	Croatia	Wales	Russia
Israel Cyprus Malta	Romania Bosnia and Herzegovina Luxembourg	Austria Moldova Belarus	Poland Hungary San Marino	Iceland Lithuania Faroe Islands	Ukraine Armenia Northern Ireland	Slovakia Macedonia Liechtenstein	Belgium Estonia Andorra	Serbia and Montenegro Finland Azerbaijan	Republic of Ireland Albania Georgia

== Groups ==
=== Group 1 ===
Pos	Team	Pld	W	D	L	GF	GA	GD	Pts	Qualification	(France)	(Slovenia)	(Israel)	(Cyprus)	(Malta)
1	France	8	8	0	0	29	2	+27	24	Qualify for final tournament	—	5–0	3–0	5–0	6–0
2	Slovenia	8	4	2	2	15	12	+3	14	Advance to play-offs	0–2	—	3–1	4–1	3–0
3	Israel	8	2	3	3	9	11	−2	9		1–2	0–0	—	2–0	2–2
4	Cyprus	8	2	2	4	9	18	−9	8		1–2	2–2	1–1	—	2–1
5	Malta	8	0	1	7	5	24	−19	1		0–4	1–3	0–2	1–2	—

Source: UEFA

=== Group 2 ===
Pos	Team	Pld	W	D	L	GF	GA	GD	Pts	Qualification	(Denmark)	(Norway)	(Romania)	(Bosnia and Herzegovina)	(Luxembourg)
1	Denmark	8	4	3	1	15	9	+6	15	Qualify for final tournament	—	1–0	2–2	0–2	2–0
2	Norway	8	4	2	2	9	5	+4	14 (Note: Head-to-head points: Norway 4, Romania 1.)	Advance to play-offs	2–2	—	1–1	2–0	1–0
3	Romania	8	4	2	2	21	9	+12	14		2–5	0–1	—	2–0	4–0
4	Bosnia and Herzegovina	8	4	1	3	7	8	−1	13		1–1	1–0	0–3	—	2–0
5	Luxembourg	8	0	0	8	0	21	−21	0		0–2	0–2	0–7	0–1	—

Source: UEFA

=== Group 3 ===
Pos	Team	Pld	W	D	L	GF	GA	GD	Pts	Qualification	(Czech Republic)	(Netherlands)	(Austria)	(Moldova)	(Belarus)
1	Czech Republic	8	7	1	0	23	5	+18	22	Qualify for final tournament	—	3–1	4–0	5–0	2–0
2	Netherlands	8	6	1	1	20	6	+14	19	Advance to play-offs	1–1	—	3–1	5–0	3–0
3	Austria	8	3	0	5	12	14	−2	9		2–3	0–3	—	2–0	5–0
4	Moldova	8	2	0	6	5	19	−14	6		0–2	1–2	1–0	—	2–1
5	Belarus	8	1	0	7	4	20	−16	3		1–3	0–2	0–2	2–1	—

Source: UEFA

=== Group 4 ===
Pos	Team	Pld	W	D	L	GF	GA	GD	Pts	Qualification	(Sweden)	(Latvia)	(Poland)	(Hungary)	(San Marino)
1	Sweden	8	5	2	1	19	3	+16	17	Qualify for final tournament	—	0–1	3–0	1–1	5–0
2	Latvia	8	5	1	2	10	6	+4	16	Advance to play-offs	0–0	—	0–2	3–1	3–0
3	Poland	8	4	1	3	11	7	+4	13		0–2	0–1	—	0–0	5–0
4	Hungary	8	3	2	3	15	9	+6	11		1–2	3–1	1–2	—	3–0
5	San Marino	8	0	0	8	0	30	−30	0		0–6	0–1	0–2	0–5	—

Source: UEFA

=== Group 5 ===
Pos	Team	Pld	W	D	L	GF	GA	GD	Pts	Qualification	(Germany)	(Scotland)	(Iceland)	(Lithuania)	(Faroe Islands)
1	Germany	8	5	3	0	13	4	+9	18	Qualify for final tournament	—	2–1	3–0	1–1	2–1
2	Scotland	8	4	2	2	12	8	+4	14	Advance to play-offs	1–1	—	2–1	1–0	3–1
3	Iceland	8	4	1	3	11	9	+2	13		0–0	0–2	—	3–0	2–1
4	Lithuania	8	3	1	4	7	11	−4	10		0–2	1–0	0–3	—	2–0
5	Faroe Islands	8	0	1	7	7	18	−11	1		0–2	2–2	1–2	1–3	—

Source: UEFA

=== Group 6 ===
Pos	Team	Pld	W	D	L	GF	GA	GD	Pts	Qualification	(Greece)	(Spain)	(Ukraine)	(Armenia)	(Northern Ireland)
1	Greece	8	6	0	2	8	4	+4	18	Qualify for final tournament	—	0–2	1–0	2–0	1–0
2	Spain	8	5	2	1	16	4	+12	17	Advance to play-offs	0–1	—	2–1	3–0	3–0
3	Ukraine	8	2	4	2	11	10	+1	10		2–0	2–2	—	4–3	0–0
4	Armenia	8	2	1	5	7	16	−9	7		0–1	0–4	2–2	—	1–0
5	Northern Ireland	8	0	3	5	0	8	−8	3		0–2	0–0	0–0	0–1	—

Source: UEFA

=== Group 7 ===
Pos	Team	Pld	W	D	L	GF	GA	GD	Pts	Qualification	(England)	(Turkey)	(Slovakia)	(North Macedonia)	(Liechtenstein)
1	England	8	6	2	0	14	5	+9	20	Qualify for final tournament	—	2–0	2–1	2–2	2–0
2	Turkey	8	6	1	1	17	5	+12	19	Advance to play-offs	0–0	—	3–0	3–2	5–0
3	Slovakia	8	3	1	4	11	9	+2	10		1–2	0–1	—	1–1	4–0
4	Macedonia	8	1	3	4	11	14	−3	6		1–2	1–2	0–2	—	3–1
5	Liechtenstein	8	0	1	7	2	22	−20	1		0–2	0–3	0–2	1–1	—

Source: UEFA

=== Group 8 ===
Pos	Team	Pld	W	D	L	GF	GA	GD	Pts	Qualification	(Bulgaria)	(Croatia)	(Belgium)	(Estonia)	(Andorra)
1	Bulgaria	8	5	2	1	13	4	+9	17	Qualify for final tournament	—	2–0	2–2	2–0	2–1
2	Croatia	8	5	1	2	12	4	+8	16 (Note: Tied on head-to-head points (3). Head-to-head goal difference: Croatia +3, Belgium −3.)	Advance to play-offs	1–0	—	4–0	0–0	2–0
3	Belgium	8	5	1	2	11	9	+2	16		0–2	2–1	—	2–0	3–0
4	Estonia	8	2	2	4	4	6	−2	8		0–0	0–1	0–1	—	2–0
5	Andorra	8	0	0	8	1	18	−17	0		0–3	0–3	0–1	0–2	—

Source: UEFA

=== Group 9 ===
Pos	Team	Pld	W	D	L	GF	GA	GD	Pts	Qualification	(Italy)	(Wales)	(Serbia and Montenegro)	(Finland)	(Azerbaijan)
1	Italy	8	5	2	1	17	4	+13	17	Qualify for final tournament	—	4–0	1–1	2–0	4–0
2	Wales	8	4	1	3	13	10	+3	13	Advance to play-offs	2–1	—	2–3	1–1	4–0
3	Serbia and Montenegro (Note: The official name of the country was changed from FR Yugoslavia to Serbia and Montenegro on 4 February 2003, during the qualifying process.)	8	3	3	2	11	11	0	12		1–1	1–0	—	2–0	2–2
4	Finland	8	3	1	4	9	10	−1	10		0–2	0–2	3–0	—	3–0
5	Azerbaijan	8	1	1	6	5	20	−15	4		0–2	0–2	2–1	1–2	—

Source: UEFA

=== Group 10 ===
Pos	Team	Pld	W	D	L	GF	GA	GD	Pts	Qualification	(Switzerland)	(Russia)	(Republic of Ireland)	(Albania)	(Georgia (country))
1	Switzerland	8	4	3	1	15	11	+4	15	Qualify for final tournament	—	2–2	2–0	3–2	4–1
2	Russia	8	4	2	2	19	12	+7	14	Advance to play-offs	4–1	—	4–2	4–1	3–1
3	Republic of Ireland	8	3	2	3	10	11	−1	11		1–2	1–1	—	2–1	2–0
4	Albania	8	2	2	4	11	15	−4	8		1–1	3–1	0–0	—	3–1
5	Georgia	8	2	1	5	8	14	−6	7		0–0	1–0 (Note: The Georgia v Russia match originally was played on 12 October 2002, but was abandoned at half-time with the score 0–0 due to floodlight failure and rescheduled.)	1–2	3–0	—

Source: UEFA

== Play-offs ==
Team 1	Agg.	Team 2	1st leg	2nd leg
Latvia	3–2	Turkey	1–0	2–2
Scotland	1–6	Netherlands	1–0	0–6
Croatia	2–1	Slovenia	1–1	1–0
Russia	1–0	Wales	0–0	1–0
Spain	5–1	Norway	2–1	3–0

== Goalscorers ==
There were 566 goals scored in 211 matches, for an average of 2.68 goals per match.

9 goals

- (Slovenia national football team) Ermin Šiljak

7 goals

- (Spain national football team) Raúl

6 goals

- (Czech Republic national football team) Jan Koller
- (France national football team) Thierry Henry
- (France national football team) David Trezeguet
- (France national football team) Sylvain Wiltord
- (Italy national football team) Filippo Inzaghi
- (Latvia national football team) Māris Verpakovskis

5 goals

- (Belgium national football team) Wesley Sonck
- (Bulgaria national football team) Dimitar Berbatov
- (Denmark national football team) Jon Dahl Tomasson
- (England national football team) David Beckham
- (England national football team) Michael Owen
- (Iceland national football team) Eiður Guðjohnsen
- (Italy national football team) Alessandro Del Piero
- (Netherlands national football team) Ruud van Nistelrooy
- (Sweden men's national football team) Marcus Allbäck
- (Switzerland national football team) Alexander Frei

4 goals

- (Georgia national football team) Shota Arveladze
- (Germany national football team) Michael Ballack
- (Germany national football team) Fredi Bobic
- (Hungary national football team) Zoltán Gera
- (Hungary national football team) Krisztián Lisztes
- (Hungary national football team) Imre Szabics
- (Netherlands national football team) Patrick Kluivert
- (Romania national football team) Ionel Ganea
- (Romania national football team) Adrian Mutu
- (Russia national football team) Dmitri Bulykin
- (Slovakia national football team) Szilárd Németh
- (Sweden men's national football team) Mattias Jonson
- (Wales national football team) John Hartson

3 goals

- (Armenia national football team) Artur Petrosyan
- (Armenia national football team) Albert Sarkisyan
- (Azerbaijan national football team) Gurban Gurbanov
- (Bosnia and Herzegovina national football team) Sergej Barbarez
- (Croatia national football team) Dado Pršo
- (Cyprus national football team) Michalis Konstantinou
- (Czech Republic national football team) Milan Baroš
- (Czech Republic national football team) Marek Jankulovski
- (France national football team) Zinedine Zidane
- (Greece national football team) Angelos Charisteas
- (Israel national football team) Haim Revivo
- (Italy national football team) Christian Vieri
- (Latvia national football team) Imants Bleidelis
- (Lithuania national football team) Tomas Ražanauskas
- (Malta national football team) Michael Mifsud
- (Netherlands national football team) Rafael van der Vaart
- (Republic of Ireland national football team) Gary Doherty
- (Romania national football team) Cosmin Contra
- (Russia national football team) Sergei Ignashevich
- (Serbia and Montenegro national football team) Predrag Mijatović
- (Sweden men's national football team) Zlatan Ibrahimović
- (Switzerland national football team) Hakan Yakin
- (Turkey national football team) Serhat Akın
- (Turkey national football team) Okan Buruk
- (Turkey national football team) Nihat Kahveci
- (Turkey national football team) Hakan Şükür
- (Ukraine national football team) Andriy Shevchenko
- (Wales national football team) Simon Davies

2 goals

- (Albania national football team) Altin Lala
- (Albania national football team) Ervin Skela
- (Albania national football team) Igli Tare
- (Austria national football team) Mario Haas
- (Austria national football team) Andi Herzog
- (Azerbaijan national football team) Farrukh Ismayilov
- (Belgium national football team) Bart Goor
- (Bosnia and Herzegovina national football team) Elvir Bolić
- (Bulgaria national football team) Stiliyan Petrov
- (Croatia national football team) Niko Kovač
- (Croatia national football team) Milan Rapaić
- (Cyprus national football team) Ioannis Okkas
- (Cyprus national football team) Rainer Rauffmann
- (Czech Republic national football team) Vratislav Lokvenc
- (Czech Republic national football team) Pavel Nedvěd
- (Czech Republic national football team) Karel Poborský
- (Czech Republic national football team) Vladimír Šmicer
- (Denmark national football team) Thomas Gravesen
- (Denmark national football team) Dennis Rommedahl
- (England national football team) Wayne Rooney
- (Estonia national football team) Indrek Zelinski
- (Faroe Islands national football team) Rógvi Jacobsen
- (Faroe Islands national football team) John Petersen
- (Finland national football team) Mikael Forssell
- (Finland national football team) Sami Hyypiä
- (France national football team) Steve Marlet
- (Germany national football team) Miroslav Klose
- (Greece national football team) Demis Nikolaidis
- (Hungary national football team) Krisztián Kenesei
- (Israel national football team) Omri Afek
- (Israel national football team) Pini Balili
- (Latvia national football team) Juris Laizāns
- (Lithuania national football team) Igoris Morinas
- (North Macedonia national football team) Vlatko Grozdanoski
- (North Macedonia national football team) Gjorgji Hristov
- (North Macedonia national football team) Artim Šakiri
- (Netherlands national football team) Phillip Cocu
- (Netherlands national football team) Wesley Sneijder
- (Norway national football team) Steffen Iversen
- (Norway national football team) John Arne Riise
- (Norway national football team) Ole Gunnar Solskjær
- (Poland national football team) Marcin Kuźba
- (Poland national football team) Andrzej Niedzielan
- (Poland national football team) Mirosław Szymkowiak
- (Republic of Ireland national football team) Damien Duff
- (Republic of Ireland national football team) Robbie Keane
- (Romania national football team) Viorel Moldovan
- (Romania national football team) Dorinel Munteanu
- (Romania national football team) Daniel Pancu
- (Russia national football team) Andrei Karyaka
- (Russia national football team) Aleksandr Kerzhakov
- (Russia national football team) Sergei Semak
- (Scotland national football team) Neil McCann
- (Scotland national football team) James McFadden
- (Scotland national football team) Kenny Miller
- (Slovakia national football team) Vladimír Janočko
- (Slovakia national football team) Ľubomír Reiter
- (Slovakia national football team) Róbert Vittek
- (Slovenia national football team) Nastja Čeh
- (Slovenia national football team) Zlatko Zahovič
- (Spain national football team) Rubén Baraja
- (Spain national football team) Joseba Etxeberria
- (Spain national football team) José Antonio Reyes
- (Spain national football team) Juan Carlos Valerón
- (Sweden men's national football team) Anders Svensson
- (Turkey national football team) Arif Erdem
- (Turkey national football team) İlhan Mansız
- (Ukraine national football team) Oleksandr Horshkov
- (Ukraine national football team) Andriy Voronin
- (Wales national football team) Craig Bellamy
- (Wales national football team) Gary Speed

1 goal

- (Albania national football team) Alban Bushi
- (Albania national football team) Klodian Duro
- (Albania national football team) Besnik Hasi
- (Albania national football team) Edvin Murati
- (Albania national football team) Altin Rraklli
- (Andorra national football team) Antoni Lima
- (Armenia national football team) Arman Karamyan
- (Austria national football team) Muhammet Akagündüz
- (Austria national football team) René Aufhauser
- (Austria national football team) Harald Cerny
- (Austria national football team) Andreas Ivanschitz
- (Austria national football team) Roland Kirchler
- (Austria national football team) Emanuel Pogatetz
- (Austria national football team) Markus Schopp
- (Austria national football team) Roman Wallner
- (Belarus national football team) Vital Bulyga
- (Belarus national football team) Sergei Gurenko
- (Belarus national football team) Vitali Kutuzov
- (Belarus national football team) Raman Vasilyuk
- (Belgium national football team) Thomas Buffel
- (Belgium national football team) Philippe Clement
- (Bosnia and Herzegovina national football team) Zlatan Bajramović
- (Bosnia and Herzegovina national football team) Elvir Baljić
- (Bulgaria national football team) Krasimir Balakov
- (Bulgaria national football team) Georgi Chilikov
- (Bulgaria national football team) Marian Hristov
- (Bulgaria national football team) Zoran Janković
- (Bulgaria national football team) Martin Petrov
- (Bulgaria national football team) Svetoslav Todorov
- (Croatia national football team) Jerko Leko
- (Croatia national football team) Tomislav Marić
- (Croatia national football team) Ivica Olić
- (Croatia national football team) Đovani Roso
- (Croatia national football team) Dario Šimić
- (Croatia national football team) Josip Šimunić
- (Croatia national football team) Darijo Srna
- (Cyprus national football team) Stavros Georgiou
- (Cyprus national football team) Yiasoumis Yiasoumi
- (Czech Republic national football team) Tomáš Rosický
- (Czech Republic national football team) Jiří Štajner
- (Czech Republic national football team) Štěpán Vachoušek
- (Denmark national football team) Jesper Grønkjær
- (Denmark national football team) Claus Jensen
- (Denmark national football team) Martin Jørgensen
- (Denmark national football team) Martin Laursen
- (Denmark national football team) Ebbe Sand
- (England national football team) Steven Gerrard
- (England national football team) Darius Vassell
- (Estonia national football team) Teet Allas
- (Estonia national football team) Kristen Viikmäe
- (Faroe Islands national football team) Julian Johnsson
- (Faroe Islands national football team) Súni Olsen
- (Finland national football team) Joonas Kolkka
- (Finland national football team) Mika Nurmela
- (Finland national football team) Teemu Tainio
- (Finland national football team) Hannu Tihinen
- (France national football team) Jean-Alain Boumsong
- (France national football team) Eric Carrière
- (France national football team) Djibril Cissé
- (France national football team) Olivier Dacourt
- (France national football team) Sidney Govou
- (France national football team) Patrick Vieira
- (Georgia national football team) Malkhaz Asatiani
- (Georgia national football team) Mikheil Ashvetia
- (Georgia national football team) Aleksandre Iashvili
- (Georgia national football team) Levan Kobiashvili
- (Germany national football team) Kevin Kurányi
- (Germany national football team) Carsten Ramelow
- (Greece national football team) Stelios Giannakopoulos
- (Greece national football team) Vasilios Tsiartas
- (Greece national football team) Zisis Vryzas
- (Hungary national football team) Zoltán Böőr
- (Iceland national football team) Þórður Guðjónsson
- (Iceland national football team) Tryggvi Guðmundsson
- (Iceland national football team) Heiðar Helguson
- (Iceland national football team) Hermann Hreiðarsson
- (Iceland national football team) Pétur Marteinsson
- (Iceland national football team) Helgi Sigurðsson
- (Israel national football team) Walid Badir
- (Israel national football team) Shay Holtzman
- (Italy national football team) Marco Di Vaio
- (Italy national football team) Francesco Totti
- (Latvia national football team) Andrejs Prohorenkovs
- (Liechtenstein national football team) Roger Beck
- (Liechtenstein national football team) Michael Stocklasa
- (Lithuania national football team) Robertas Poškus
- (Lithuania national football team) Donatas Vencevičius
- (North Macedonia national football team) Dragan Dimitrovski
- (North Macedonia national football team) Mile Krstev
- (North Macedonia national football team) Goce Sedloski
- (North Macedonia national football team) Aco Stojkov
- (North Macedonia national football team) Vančo Trajanov
- (Malta national football team) David Carabott
- (Malta national football team) Luke Dimech
- (Moldova national football team) Vadim Boreț
- (Moldova national football team) Boris Cebotari
- (Moldova national football team) Serghei Covalciuc
- (Moldova national football team) Sergiu Dadu
- (Moldova national football team) Viorel Frunză
- (Netherlands national football team) Edgar Davids
- (Netherlands national football team) Frank de Boer
- (Netherlands national football team) Jimmy Floyd Hasselbaink
- (Netherlands national football team) Roy Makaay
- (Netherlands national football team) André Ooijer
- (Netherlands national football team) Marc Overmars
- (Netherlands national football team) Arjen Robben
- (Netherlands national football team) Clarence Seedorf
- (Netherlands national football team) Mark van Bommel
- (Netherlands national football team) Pierre van Hooijdonk
- (Norway national football team) John Carew
- (Norway national football team) Tore André Flo
- (Norway national football team) Claus Lundekvam
- (Norway national football team) Sigurd Rushfeldt
- (Poland national football team) Paweł Kaczorowski
- (Poland national football team) Bartosz Karwan
- (Poland national football team) Tomasz Kłos
- (Poland national football team) Kamil Kosowski
- (Poland national football team) Mariusz Kukiełka
- (Republic of Ireland national football team) Clinton Morrison
- (Romania national football team) Florin Bratu
- (Romania national football team) Cristian Chivu
- (Romania national football team) Tiberiu Ghioane
- (Romania national football team) Mirel Rădoi
- (Russia national football team) Vladimir Beschastnykh
- (Russia national football team) Vadim Evseev
- (Russia national football team) Aleksandr Mostovoi
- (Russia national football team) Viktor Onopko
- (Russia national football team) Dmitri Sychev
- (Russia national football team) Yegor Titov
- (Scotland national football team) Christian Dailly
- (Scotland national football team) Paul Dickov
- (Scotland national football team) Barry Ferguson
- (Scotland national football team) Darren Fletcher
- (Scotland national football team) Paul Lambert
- (Scotland national football team) Gary Naysmith
- (Scotland national football team) Lee Wilkie
- (Serbia and Montenegro national football team) Branko Bošković
- (Serbia and Montenegro national football team) Saša Ilić
- (Serbia and Montenegro national football team) Darko Kovačević
- (Serbia and Montenegro national football team) Nikola Lazetić
- (Serbia and Montenegro national football team) Danijel Ljuboja
- (Serbia and Montenegro national football team) Savo Milošević
- (Serbia and Montenegro national football team) Dragan Mladenović
- (Serbia and Montenegro national football team) Zvonimir Vukić
- (Slovakia national football team) Martin Petráš
- (Slovenia national football team) Sebastjan Cimirotič
- (Slovenia national football team) Aleksander Knavs
- (Spain national football team) Guti
- (Spain national football team) Iván Helguera
- (Spain national football team) Joaquín
- (Spain national football team) Vicente Rodríguez
- (Spain national football team) Diego Tristán
- (Sweden men's national football team) Andreas Jakobsson
- (Sweden men's national football team) Kim Källström
- (Sweden men's national football team) Freddie Ljungberg
- (Sweden men's national football team) Olof Mellberg
- (Sweden men's national football team) Mikael Nilsson
- (Switzerland national football team) Ricardo Cabanas
- (Switzerland national football team) Fabio Celestini
- (Switzerland national football team) Stéphane Chapuisat
- (Switzerland national football team) Bernt Haas
- (Switzerland national football team) Patrick Müller
- (Switzerland national football team) Murat Yakin
- (Turkey national football team) Ümit Davala
- (Turkey national football team) Gökdeniz Karadeniz
- (Turkey national football team) Tümer Metin
- (Ukraine national football team) Serhiy Fedorov
- (Ukraine national football team) Serhiy Serebrennikov
- (Ukraine national football team) Andriy Vorobey
- (Ukraine national football team) Hennadiy Zubov
- (Wales national football team) Robert Earnshaw
- (Wales national football team) Ryan Giggs

1 own goal

- (Albania national football team) Adrian Aliaj (against Republic of Ireland)
- (Azerbaijan national football team) Emin Ağayev (against Finland)
- (Azerbaijan national football team) Tarlan Ahmadov (against Italy)
- (Bulgaria national football team) Stiliyan Petrov (against Belgium)
- (Estonia national football team) Raio Piiroja (against Belgium)
- (Germany national football team) Arne Friedrich (against Faroe Islands)
- (Lithuania national football team) Marius Stankevičius (against Germany)
- (Malta national football team) Darren Debono (against Slovenia)
- (Norway national football team) Henning Berg (against Spain)
- (Republic of Ireland national football team) Phil Babb (against Russia)
- (Romania national football team) Cosmin Contra (against Denmark)
- (Russia national football team) Andrei Karyaka (against Switzerland)
- (San Marino national football team) Carlo Valentini (against Latvia)
- (Switzerland national football team) Ludovic Magnin (against Republic of Ireland)
