= UEFA Euro 2004 qualifying Group 9 =

Football tournament qualification stage

Standings and results for Group 9 of the UEFA Euro 2004 qualifying tournament.

Group 9 consisted of Azerbaijan, Finland, Italy, Serbia and Montenegro and Wales. Serbia and Montenegro began the campaign as the FR Yugoslavia, but officially changed their name in February 2003. Group winners were Italy, who finished four points clear of second-placed team Wales who qualified for the play-offs.

== Standings ==
Pos	Team	Pld	W	D	L	GF	GA	GD	Pts	Qualification	(Italy)	(Wales)	(Serbia and Montenegro)	(Finland)	(Azerbaijan)
1	Italy	8	5	2	1	17	4	+13	17	Qualify for final tournament	—	4–0	1–1	2–0	4–0
2	Wales	8	4	1	3	13	10	+3	13	Advance to play-offs	2–1	—	2–3	1–1	4–0
3	Serbia and Montenegro (Note: The official name of the country was changed from FR Yugoslavia to Serbia and Montenegro on 4 February 2003, during the qualifying process.)	8	3	3	2	11	11	0	12		1–1	1–0	—	2–0	2–2
4	Finland	8	3	1	4	9	10	−1	10		0–2	0–2	3–0	—	3–0
5	Azerbaijan	8	1	1	6	5	20	−15	4		0–2	0–2	2–1	1–2	—

Source: UEFA
Rules for classification: Qualification tiebreakers

== Matches ==
7 September 2002
19:00 UTC+03:00

Finland	0–2	Wales
	Report	Hartson 30'; Davies 72'

Helsinki Olympic Stadium, Helsinki
Attendance: 35,833
Referee: Konrad Plautz (Austria)
7 September 2002
23:00 UTC+05:00

Azerbaijan	0–2	Italy
	Report	Ahmadov 33' (o.g.); Del Piero 65'

Tofiq Bahramov Republican Stadium, Baku
Attendance: 28,000
Referee: Kyros Vassaras (Greece)

12 October 2002
19:00 UTC+03:00

Finland	3–0	Azerbaijan
Agaev 14' (o.g.); Tihinen 60'; Hyypiä 72'	Report

Helsinki Olympic Stadium, Helsinki
Attendance: 11,853
Referee: Alain Hamer (Luxembourg)
12 October 2002
20:45 UTC+02:00

Italy	1–1	FR Yugoslavia
Del Piero 38'	Report	Mijatović 27'

Stadio San Paolo, Naples
Attendance: 43,661
Referee: Manuel Mejuto González (Spain)

16 October 2002
19:00 UTC+02:00

FR Yugoslavia	2–0	Finland
Kovačević 55'; Mihajlović 84' (pen.)	Report

Red Star Stadium, Belgrade
Attendance: 22,113
Referee: Dick van Egmond (Netherlands)
16 October 2002
19:45 UTC+01:00

Wales	2–1	Italy
Davies 11'; Bellamy 70'	Report	Del Piero 31'

Millennium Stadium, Cardiff
Attendance: 71,000
Referee: Gilles Veissière (France)

20 November 2002
19:00 UTC+04:00

Azerbaijan	0–2	Wales
	Report	Speed 10'; Hartson 68'

Tofiq Bahramov Republican Stadium, Baku
Attendance: 9,500
Referee: Luc Huyghe (Belgium)

12 February 2003
15:30 UTC+01:00

Serbia and Montenegro	2–2	Azerbaijan
Mijatović 33' (pen.); Lazetić 52'	Report	Gurbanov 58', 77'

Podgorica City Stadium, Podgorica
Attendance: 6,500
Referee: Jacek Granat (Poland)

29 March 2003
15:30 UTC

Wales	4–0	Azerbaijan
Davies 1'; Speed 40'; Hartson 43'; Giggs 52'	Report

Millennium Stadium, Cardiff
Attendance: 73,500
Referee: Philippe Leuba (Switzerland)
29 March 2003
21:00 UTC+01:00

Italy	2–0	Finland
Vieri 6', 23'	Report

Stadio Renzo Barbera, Palermo
Attendance: 34,074
Referee: Valentin Ivanov (Russia)

7 June 2003
19:00 UTC+03:00

Finland	3–0	Serbia and Montenegro
Hyypiä 19'; Kolkka 45'; Forssell 56'	Report

Helsinki Olympic Stadium, Helsinki
Attendance: 17,343
Referee: Claude Colombo (France)

11 June 2003
20:00 UTC+05:00

Azerbaijan	2–1	Serbia and Montenegro
Gurbanov 88' (pen.); Ismayilov 90+1'	Report	Bošković 27'

Shafa stadium, Baku
Attendance: 1,500
Referee: Knud Erik Fisker (Denmark)
11 June 2003
21:00 UTC+03:00

Finland	0–2	Italy
	Report	Totti 31'; Del Piero 73'

Helsinki Olympic Stadium, Helsinki
Attendance: 36,850
Referee: Željko Širić (Croatia)

20 August 2003
20:15 UTC+02:00

Serbia and Montenegro	1–0	Wales
Mladenović 73'	Report

Red Star Stadium, Belgrade
Attendance: 19,752
Referee: Anders Frisk (Sweden)

6 September 2003
19:00 UTC+05:00

Azerbaijan	1–2	Finland
Ismayilov 88'	Report	Tainio 52'; Nurmela 74'

Shafa stadium, Baku
Attendance: 6,500
Referee: Vladimír Hriňák (Slovakia)
6 September 2003
20:45 UTC+02:00

Italy	4–0	Wales
Inzaghi 59', 63', 70'; Del Piero 76' (pen.)	Report

San Siro, Milan
Attendance: 69,000
Referee: Markus Merk (Germany)

10 September 2003
19:45 UTC+01:00

Wales	1–1	Finland
Davies 3'	Report	Forssell 79'

Millennium Stadium, Cardiff
Attendance: 73,411
Referee: Arturo Daudén Ibánez (Spain)
10 September 2003
20:45 UTC+02:00

Serbia and Montenegro	1–1	Italy
Ilić 82'	Report	Inzaghi 22'

Red Star Stadium, Belgrade
Attendance: 25,631
Referee: Alain Hamer (Luxembourg)

11 October 2003
19:45 UTC+01:00

Wales	2–3	Serbia and Montenegro
Hartson 26' (pen.); Earnshaw 90+3'	Report	Vukić 6'; Milošević 82'; Ljuboja 88'

Millennium Stadium, Cardiff
Attendance: 72,514
Referee: Fritz Stuchlik (Austria)
11 October 2003
20:45 UTC+02:00

Italy	4–0	Azerbaijan
Vieri 16'; Inzaghi 24', 87'; Di Vaio 64'	Report

Stadio Oreste Granillo, Reggio Calabria
Attendance: 22,100
Referee: Stuart Dougal (Scotland)

== Goalscorers ==
There were 55 goals scored in 20 matches, for an average of 2.75 goals per match.

6 goals

- (Italy) Filippo Inzaghi

5 goals

- (Italy) Alessandro Del Piero

4 goals

- (Wales) John Hartson

3 goals

- (Azerbaijan) Gurban Gurbanov
- (Italy) Christian Vieri
- (Serbia and Montenegro) Predrag Mijatović
- (Wales) Simon Davies

2 goals

- (Azerbaijan) Farrukh Ismayilov
- (Finland) Mikael Forssell
- (Finland) Sami Hyypiä
- (Wales) Craig Bellamy
- (Wales) Gary Speed

1 goal

- (Finland) Joonas Kolkka
- (Finland) Mika Nurmela
- (Finland) Teemu Tainio
- (Finland) Hannu Tihinen
- (Italy) Marco Di Vaio
- (Italy) Francesco Totti
- (Serbia and Montenegro) Branko Bošković
- (Serbia and Montenegro) Saša Ilić
- (Serbia and Montenegro) Darko Kovačević
- (Serbia and Montenegro) Nikola Lazetić
- (Serbia and Montenegro) Danijel Ljuboja
- (Serbia and Montenegro) Savo Milošević
- (Serbia and Montenegro) Dragan Mladenović
- (Serbia and Montenegro) Zvonimir Vukić
- (Wales) Robert Earnshaw
- (Wales) Ryan Giggs

1 own goal

- (Azerbaijan) Emin Ağayev (against Finland)
- (Azerbaijan) Tarlan Ahmadov (against Italy)
