= UEFA Euro 2004 qualifying Group 1 =

Football tournament qualification stage

Standings and results for Group 1 of the UEFA Euro 2004 qualifying tournament.

Group 1 consisted of Cyprus, France, Israel, Malta and Slovenia. Group winners were France, who finished with a 100% record, ten points clear of second-placed Slovenia who in turn qualified for the playoffs.

Israel were forced to play all home games away from Israel due to the ongoing violence regarding the Israeli–Palestinian conflict.

== Standings ==
Pos	Team	Pld	W	D	L	GF	GA	GD	Pts	Qualification	(France)	(Slovenia)	(Israel)	(Cyprus)	(Malta)
1	France	8	8	0	0	29	2	+27	24	Qualify for final tournament	—	5–0	3–0	5–0	6–0
2	Slovenia	8	4	2	2	15	12	+3	14	Advance to play-offs	0–2	—	3–1	4–1	3–0
3	Israel	8	2	3	3	9	11	−2	9		1–2	0–0	—	2–0	2–2
4	Cyprus	8	2	2	4	9	18	−9	8		1–2	2–2	1–1	—	2–1
5	Malta	8	0	1	7	5	24	−19	1		0–4	1–3	0–2	1–2	—

Source: UEFA
Rules for classification: Qualification tiebreakers

== Matches ==
7 September 2002
19:00 UTC+3

Cyprus	1–2	France
Okkas 14'	Report	Cissé 39'; Wiltord 51'

GSP Stadium, Nicosia
Attendance: 11,898
Referee: Herbert Fandel (Germany)
7 September 2002
20:15 UTC+2

Slovenia	3–0	Malta
Debono 37' (o.g.); Šiljak 59'; Cimirotič 90'	Report

Bežigrad Stadium, Ljubljana
Attendance: 7,800
Referee: Georgios Borovilos (Greece)

12 October 2002
19:00 UTC+2

Malta	0–2	Israel
	Report	Balili 56'; Revivo 76'

Ta' Qali National Stadium, Ta' Qali
Attendance: 3,163
Referee: Sergei Shebek (Ukraine)
12 October 2002
20:45 UTC+2

France	5–0	Slovenia
Vieira 10'; Marlet 35', 64'; Wiltord 79'; Govou 86'	Report

Stade de France, Saint-Denis
Attendance: 77,619
Referee: Kim Milton Nielsen (Denmark)

16 October 2002
20:45 UTC+2

Malta	0–4	France
	Report	Henry 25', 35'; Wiltord 59'; Carrière 84'

Ta' Qali National Stadium, Ta' Qali
Attendance: 9,748
Referee: Alexandru Tudor (Romania)

20 November 2002
19:00 UTC+2

Cyprus	2–1	Malta
Rauffmann 50'; Okkas 74'	Report	Mifsud 90'

GSP Stadium, Nicosia
Attendance: 5,000
Referee: Anton Guenov (Bulgaria)

29 March 2003
19:00 UTC+2

Cyprus	1–1	Israel
Rauffmann 61'	Report	Afek 2'

Tsirion Stadium, Limassol
Attendance: 5,500
Referee: Mike McCurry (Scotland)
29 March 2003
20:45 UTC+1

France	6–0	Malta
Wiltord 36'; Henry 38', 54'; Zidane 57' (pen.), 80'; Trezeguet 70'	Report

Stade Félix-Bollaert, Lens
Attendance: 40,775
Referee: Emil Bozinovski (Macedonia)

2 April 2003
20:15 UTC+2

Slovenia	4–1	Cyprus
Šiljak 4', 14'; Zahovič 38' (pen.); Čeh 43'	Report	Konstantinou 10'

Bežigrad Stadium, Ljubljana
Attendance: 4,000
Referee: Paulo Manuel Gomes Costa (Portugal)
2 April 2003
20:45 UTC+2

Israel	1–2	France
Afek 2'	Report	Trezeguet 23'; Zidane 45'

Renzo Barbera Stadium, Palermo
Attendance: 2,455
Referee: Graham Barber (England)

30 April 2003
20:30 UTC+2

Israel	2–0	Cyprus
Badir 88'; Holtzman 90'	Report

Renzo Barbera Stadium, Palermo
Attendance: 300
Referee: Michal Benes (Czech Republic)
30 April 2003
20:30 UTC+2

Malta	1–3	Slovenia
Mifsud 90'	Report	Zahovič 15'; Šiljak 36', 57'

Ta' Qali National Stadium, Ta' Qali
Attendance: 2,368
Referee: Attila Hanacsek (Hungary)

7 June 2003
19:00 UTC+2

Malta	1–2	Cyprus
Dimech 73'	Report	Konstantinou 23' (pen.), 62'

Ta' Qali National Stadium, Ta' Qali
Attendance: 1,607
Referee: Bernhard Brugger (Austria)
7 June 2003
21:15 UTC+3

Israel	0–0	Slovenia
	Report

Atatürk Stadium, Antalya
Attendance: 1,800
Referee: Massimo Busacca (Switzerland)

6 September 2003
20:15 UTC+2

Slovenia	3–1	Israel
Šiljak 35'; Knavs 37'; Čeh 78'	Report	Revivo 69'

Bežigrad Stadium, Ljubljana
Attendance: 8,500
Referee: Herbert Fandel (Germany)
6 September 2003
20:45 UTC+2

France	5–0	Cyprus
Trezeguet 7', 81'; Wiltord 20', 41'; Henry 60'	Report

Stade de France, Saint-Denis
Attendance: 50,132
Referee: Leslie Irvine (Scotland)

10 September 2003
18:00 UTC+3

Israel	2–2	Malta
Revivo 16'; Balili 79'	Report	Mifsud 51' (pen.); Carabott 52'

Atatürk Stadium, Antalya
Attendance: 250
Referee: Eric Blareau (Belgium)
10 September 2003
20:45 UTC+2

Slovenia	0–2	France
	Report	Trezeguet 9'; Dacourt 71'

Bežigrad Stadium, Ljubljana
Attendance: 8,500
Referee: Domenico Messina (Italy)

11 October 2003
19:30 UTC+3

Cyprus	2–2	Slovenia
Georgiou 71'; Yiasoumi 81'	Report	Šiljak 11', 41'

Tsirion Stadium, Limassol
Attendance: 2,346
Referee: Tom Henning Øvrebø (Norway)
11 October 2003
20:45 UTC+2

France	3–0	Israel
Henry 9'; Trezeguet 24'; Boumsong 42'	Report

Stade de France, Saint-Denis
Attendance: 57,009
Referee: Cosimo-Giancarlo Bolognino (Italy)

== Goalscorers ==
There were 67 goals scored in 20 matches, for an average of 3.35 goals per match.

8 goals

- (Slovenia) Ermin Šiljak

6 goals

- (France) Thierry Henry
- (France) David Trezeguet
- (France) Sylvain Wiltord

3 goals

- (Cyprus) Michalis Konstantinou
- (France) Zinedine Zidane
- (Israel) Haim Revivo
- (Malta) Michael Mifsud

2 goals

- (Cyprus) Ioannis Okkas
- (Cyprus) Rainer Rauffmann
- (France) Steve Marlet
- (Israel) Omri Afek
- (Israel) Pini Balili
- (Slovenia) Nastja Čeh
- (Slovenia) Zlatko Zahovič

1 goal

- (Cyprus) Stavros Georgiou
- (Cyprus) Yiasoumis Yiasoumi
- (France) Jean-Alain Boumsong
- (France) Eric Carrière
- (France) Djibril Cissé
- (France) Olivier Dacourt
- (France) Sidney Govou
- (France) Patrick Vieira
- (Israel) Walid Badir
- (Israel) Shay Holtzman
- (Malta) David Carabott
- (Malta) Luke Dimech
- (Slovenia) Sebastjan Cimirotič
- (Slovenia) Aleksander Knavs

1 own goal

- (Malta) Darren Debono (against Slovenia)
