= UEFA Euro 2004 qualifying play-offs =

Football tournament qualifying stage

The UEFA Euro 2004 qualifying play-offs were the last round of qualifying competition for UEFA Euro 2004. They were contested by the ten runners-up from the first-round groups of the UEFA Euro 2004 qualifying tournament. The winners of each of the five home and away ties joined the group winners in the European Championship in Portugal. The matches were played on 15 and 19 November 2003.

== Qualified teams ==
All ten group runners-up from the qualifying groups entered the play-offs:

Group	Runner-up
1	Slovenia
2	Norway
3	Netherlands
4	Latvia
5	Scotland
6	Spain
7	Turkey
8	Croatia
9	Wales
10	Russia

== Draw ==
The draw for the play-offs was held on 13 October 2003 in Frankfurt, Germany, to determine the five pairings as well as the order of the home and away ties. No seeding system was used, making the draw an open one.

== Summary ==
Team 1	Agg.	Team 2	1st leg	2nd leg
Latvia	3–2	Turkey	1–0	2–2
Scotland	1–6	Netherlands	1–0	0–6
Croatia	2–1	Slovenia	1–1	1–0
Russia	1–0	Wales	0–0	1–0
Spain	5–1	Norway	2–1	3–0

== Matches ==
15 November 2003
20:15 UTC+2

Latvia	1–0	Turkey
Verpakovskis 29'	Report

Skonto Stadium, Riga
Attendance: 8,800
Referee: Gilles Veissière (France)
19 November 2003
20:30 UTC+2

Turkey	2–2	Latvia
Mansız 20'; Şükür 64'	Report	Laizāns 66'; Verpakovskis 78'

İnönü Stadium, Istanbul
Attendance: 17,500
Referee: Anders Frisk (Sweden)

Latvia won 3–2 on aggregate and qualified for UEFA Euro 2004.

15 November 2003
15:00 UTC±0

Scotland	1–0	Netherlands
McFadden 22'	Report

Hampden Park, Glasgow
Attendance: 52,063
Referee: Terje Hauge (Norway)
19 November 2003
20:30 UTC+1

Netherlands	6–0	Scotland
Sneijder 13'; Ooijer 32'; Van Nistelrooy 37', 51', 67'; F. de Boer 65'	Report

Amsterdam Arena, Amsterdam
Attendance: 49,656
Referee: Ľuboš Micheľ (Slovakia)

Netherlands won 6–1 on aggregate and qualified for UEFA Euro 2004.

15 November 2003
17:30 UTC+1

Croatia	1–1	Slovenia
Pršo 5'	Report	Šiljak 22'

Maksimir Stadion, Zagreb
Attendance: 34,657
Referee: Markus Merk (Germany)
19 November 2003
17:30 UTC+1

Slovenia	0–1	Croatia
	Report	Pršo 61'

Bežigrad Stadium, Ljubljana
Attendance: 8,500
Referee: Urs Meier (Switzerland)

Croatia won 2–1 on aggregate and qualified for UEFA Euro 2004.

15 November 2003
19:00 UTC+3

Russia	0–0	Wales
	Report

Lokomotiv Stadium, Moscow
Attendance: 28,500
Referee: Lucílio Batista (Portugal)
19 November 2003
19:30 UTC±0

Wales	0–1	Russia
	Report	Evseev 21'

Millennium Stadium, Cardiff
Attendance: 73,062
Referee: Manuel Mejuto González (Spain)

Russia won 1–0 on aggregate and qualified for UEFA Euro 2004.

15 November 2003
22:00 UTC+1

Spain	2–1	Norway
Raúl 21'; H. Berg 85' (o.g.)	Report	Iversen 15'

Mestalla, Valencia
Attendance: 45,648
Referee: Graham Poll (England)
19 November 2003
19:30 UTC+1

Norway	0–3	Spain
	Report	Raúl 34'; Vicente 49'; Etxeberria 57'

Ullevaal Stadion, Oslo
Attendance: 25,106
Referee: Pierluigi Collina (Italy)

Spain won 5–1 on aggregate and qualified for UEFA Euro 2004.

== Goalscorers ==
There were 22 goals scored in 10 matches, for an average of 2.2 goals per match.

3 goals

- (Netherlands national football team) Ruud van Nistelrooy

2 goals

- (Croatia national football team) Dado Pršo
- (Latvia national football team) Māris Verpakovskis
- (Spain national football team) Raúl

1 goal

- (Latvia national football team) Juris Laizāns
- (Netherlands national football team) Frank de Boer
- (Netherlands national football team) André Ooijer
- (Netherlands national football team) Wesley Sneijder
- (Norway national football team) Steffen Iversen
- (Russia national football team) Vadim Evseev
- (Scotland national football team) James McFadden
- (Slovenia national football team) Ermin Šiljak
- (Spain national football team) Joseba Etxeberria
- (Spain national football team) Vicente Rodríguez
- (Turkey national football team) İlhan Mansız
- (Turkey national football team) Hakan Şükür

1 own goal

- (Norway national football team) Henning Berg (against Spain)
