= Emin Ağayev =

Emin Ağayev may refer to:

- Emin Ağayev (footballer)
- Emin Ağayev (tennis)
