= UEFA Euro 2004 qualifying Group 2 =

Football tournament qualification stage

Standings and results for Group 2 of the UEFA Euro 2004 qualifying tournament.

Group 2 consisted of Bosnia-Herzegovina, Denmark, Luxembourg, Norway and Romania. Denmark won the group, having finished a point clear of joint second-placed teams Norway and Romania. Norway qualified for the playoffs due to a better head-to-head record against Romania.

== Standings ==
Pos	Team	Pld	W	D	L	GF	GA	GD	Pts	Qualification	(Denmark)	(Norway)	(Romania)	(Bosnia and Herzegovina)	(Luxembourg)
1	Denmark	8	4	3	1	15	9	+6	15	Qualify for final tournament	—	1–0	2–2	0–2	2–0
2	Norway	8	4	2	2	9	5	+4	14 (Note: Head-to-head points: Norway 4, Romania 1.)	Advance to play-offs	2–2	—	1–1	2–0	1–0
3	Romania	8	4	2	2	21	9	+12	14		2–5	0–1	—	2–0	4–0
4	Bosnia and Herzegovina	8	4	1	3	7	8	−1	13		1–1	1–0	0–3	—	2–0
5	Luxembourg	8	0	0	8	0	21	−21	0		0–2	0–2	0–7	0–1	—

Source: UEFA
Rules for classification: Qualification tiebreakers

== Matches ==
7 September 2002
16:00 UTC+2

Norway	2–2	Denmark
Riise 54'; Carew 90'	Report	Tomasson 22', 72'

Ullevaal Stadion, Oslo
Attendance: 25,114
Referee: Hugh Dallas (Scotland)
7 September 2002
20:15 UTC+2

Bosnia and Herzegovina	0–3	Romania
	Report	Chivu 7'; Munteanu 8'; Ganea 27'

Koševo Stadium, Sarajevo
Attendance: 1,830
Referee: Lucílio Batista (Portugal)

12 October 2002
20:00 UTC+3

Romania	0–1	Norway
	Report	Iversen 83'

Stadionul Steaua, Bucharest
Attendance: 21,000
Referee: Valentin Ivanov (Russia)
12 October 2002
19:15 UTC+2

Denmark	2–0	Luxembourg
Tomasson 52' (pen.); Sand 72'	Report

Parken Stadium, Copenhagen
Attendance: 40,259
Referee: Ferenc Bede (Hungary)

16 October 2002
20:00 UTC+2

Norway	2–0	Bosnia and Herzegovina
Lundekvam 7'; Riise 27'	Report

Ullevaal Stadion, Oslo
Attendance: 24,169
Referee: Michael Benes (Czech Republic)
16 October 2002
20:00 UTC+2

Luxembourg	0–7	Romania
	Report	Moldovan 2', 5'; Rădoi 25'; Contra 45', 47', 86'; Ghioane 81'

Stade Josy Barthel, Luxembourg City
Attendance: 2,056
Referee: Romans Lajuks (Latvia)

29 March 2003
18:00 UTC+2

Romania	2–5	Denmark
Mutu 5'; Munteanu 47'	Report	Rommedahl 8', 90'; Gravesen 53'; Tomasson 71'; Contra 73' (o.g.)

Stadionul Naţional, Bucharest
Attendance: 52,000
Referee: Manuel Mejuto González (Spain)
29 March 2003
20:15 UTC+1

Bosnia and Herzegovina	2–0	Luxembourg
Bolić 58'; Barbarez 75'	Report

Bilino Polje, Zenica
Attendance: 7,380
Referee: Jouni Hyytiä (Finland)

2 April 2003
19:15 UTC+2

Denmark	0–2	Bosnia and Herzegovina
	Report	Barbarez 23'; Baljić 29'

Parken Stadium, Copenhagen
Attendance: 30,845
Referee: Anton Stredak (Slovakia)
2 April 2003
20:00 UTC+2

Luxembourg	0–2	Norway
	Report	Rushfeldt 57'; Solskjær 73'

Stade Josy Barthel, Luxembourg City
Attendance: 2,899
Referee: Ivan Dobrinov (Bulgaria)

7 June 2003
20:00 UTC+3

Romania	2–0	Bosnia and Herzegovina
Mutu 46'; Ganea 87'	Report

Stadionul Ion Oblemenco, Craiova
Attendance: 19,900
Referee: Ruud Bossen (Netherlands)
7 June 2003
19:15 UTC+2

Denmark	1–0	Norway
Grønkjær 5'	Report

Parken Stadium, Copenhagen
Attendance: 41,824
Referee: Graham Poll (England)

11 June 2003
19:45 UTC+2

Norway	1–1	Romania
Solskjær 78' (pen.)	Report	Ganea 64'

Ullevaal Stadion, Oslo
Attendance: 24,890
Referee: Lubos Michel (Slovakia)
11 June 2003
20:00 UTC+2

Luxembourg	0–2	Denmark
	Report	Jensen 2'; Gravesen 50'

Stade Josy Barthel, Luxembourg City
Attendance: 6,869
Referee: Yuri Baskakov (Russia)

6 September 2003
19:30 UTC+3

Romania	4–0	Luxembourg
Mutu 38'; Pancu 40'; Ganea 43'; Bratu 77'	Report

Stadionul Astra, Ploieşti
Attendance: 2,457
Referee: Alon Yefet (Israel)
6 September 2003
20:15 UTC+2

Bosnia and Herzegovina	1–0	Norway
Bajramović 87'	Report

Bilino Polje, Zenica
Attendance: 18,000
Referee: Stéphane Bre (France)

10 September 2003
19:15 UTC+2

Denmark	2–2	Romania
Tomasson 35' (pen.); Laursen 90+5'	Report	Mutu 62'; Pancu 72'

Parken Stadium, Copenhagen
Attendance: 42,049
Referee: Urs Meier (Switzerland)
10 September 2003
20:00 UTC+2

Luxembourg	0–1	Bosnia and Herzegovina
	Report	Barbarez 35'

Stade Josy Barthel, Luxembourg City
Attendance: 3,425
Referee: Costas Kapitanis (Cyprus)

11 October 2003
18:00 UTC+2

Norway	1–0	Luxembourg
Flo 18'	Report

Ullevaal Stadion, Oslo
Attendance: 22,255
Referee: Zsolt Szabó (Hungary)
11 October 2003
18:00 UTC+2

Bosnia and Herzegovina	1–1	Denmark
Bolić 39'	Report	Jørgensen 12'

Koševo Stadium, Sarajevo
Attendance: 32,000
Referee: Graham Barber (England)

== Goalscorers ==
There were 52 goals scored in 20 matches, for an average of 2.6 goals per match.

5 goals

- (Denmark) Jon Dahl Tomasson

4 goals

- (Romania) Ionel Ganea
- (Romania) Adrian Mutu

3 goals

- (Bosnia and Herzegovina) Sergej Barbarez
- (Romania) Cosmin Contra

2 goals

- (Bosnia and Herzegovina) Elvir Bolić
- (Denmark) Thomas Gravesen
- (Denmark) Dennis Rommedahl
- (Norway) John Arne Riise
- (Norway) Ole Gunnar Solskjær
- (Romania) Viorel Moldovan
- (Romania) Dorinel Munteanu
- (Romania) Daniel Pancu

1 goal

- (Bosnia and Herzegovina) Zlatan Bajramović
- (Bosnia and Herzegovina) Elvir Baljić
- (Denmark) Jesper Grønkjær
- (Denmark) Claus Jensen
- (Denmark) Martin Jørgensen
- (Denmark) Martin Laursen
- (Denmark) Ebbe Sand
- (Norway) John Carew
- (Norway) Tore André Flo
- (Norway) Steffen Iversen
- (Norway) Claus Lundekvam
- (Norway) Sigurd Rushfeldt
- (Romania) Florin Bratu
- (Romania) Cristian Chivu
- (Romania) Tiberiu Ghioane
- (Romania) Mirel Rădoi

1 own goal

- (Romania) Cosmin Contra (against Denmark)
