= Cosmin Contra =

Romanian footballer and manager (born 1975)

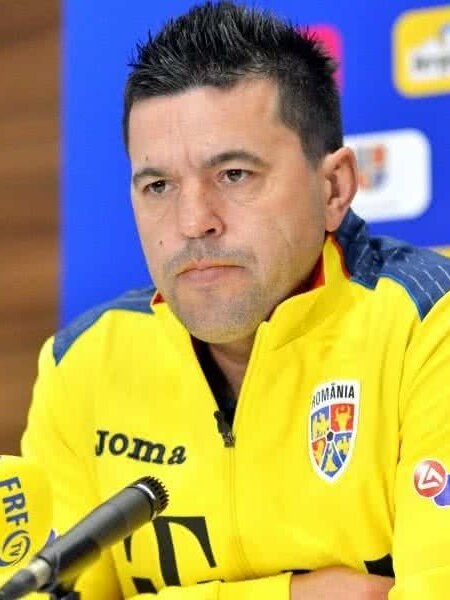
- Contra during a press conference as Romania manager in 2018

Personal information
- Full name: Cosmin Marius Contra
- Date of birth: 15 December 1975 (age 50)
- Place of birth: Timișoara, Romania
- Height: 1.80 m (5 ft 11 in)
- Positions: Right-back; midfielder

Team information
- Current team: Al-Arabi (head coach)

Youth career
- 1982–1988: CSȘ Timișoara
- 1988–1993: Politehnica Timișoara

Senior career*
Years	Team	Apps	(Gls)
1994–1995	Politehnica Timișoara	51	(1)
1996–1999	Dinamo București	101	(8)
1999–2001	Alavés	66	(5)
2001–2002	AC Milan	29	(3)
2002–2006	Atlético Madrid	34	(0)
2004	→ West Bromwich Albion (loan)	5	(0)
2005	→ Politehnica Timișoara (loan)	14	(0)
2005–2006	→ Getafe (loan)	24	(0)
2006–2010	Getafe	64	(3)
2010	→ Politehnica Timișoara (loan)	13	(3)
2010	Politehnica Timișoara	9	(1)
Total		410	(24)

International career
1995–1998	Romania U21	11	(2)
1996–2010	Romania	73	(7)

Managerial career
- 2010: Politehnica Timișoara (player/coach)
- 2011–2012: Getafe C
- 2012: Fuenlabrada
- 2012–2014: Petrolul Ploiești
- 2014–2015: Getafe
- 2015: Guangzhou R&F
- 2016: Alcorcón
- 2017: Dinamo București
- 2017–2019: Romania
- 2020: Dinamo București
- 2021–2022: Al-Ittihad
- 2023–2024: Damac
- 2025: Al-Kholood
- 2025–: Al-Arabi
- * Club domestic league appearances and goals

Cosmin Marius Contra (Romanian pronunciation: [kosˈmin ˈmari.us ˈkontra]; born 15 December 1975) is a Romanian professional football manager and former player. He is the current head coach of Qatar Stars League club Al-Arabi.

Primarily an attacking-minded right-back, he was also deployed as a midfielder. He played in three countries his own notwithstanding, mainly Spain where he appeared for Alavés, Atlético Madrid and Getafe, amassing La Liga totals of 188 games and eight goals. A Romania international for nearly 15 years, he represented the nation in two European Championships.

As a coach, Contra won the Cupa României with Petrolul Ploiești in 2013 and the Cupa Ligii with Dinamo București four years later. In September 2017, he was appointed at the helm of the Romania national team.

== Club career ==
=== Politehnica and Dinamo ===
Born in Timișoara, Contra started his professional career at local club Politehnica Timișoara, making his Divizia A debut under coach Costică Ștefănescu on 27 February 1994 at age 18 in a 1–0 win in the West derby against UTA Arad. At the end of his first season they were relegated to Divizia B, but he stayed with the side, promoting back after one year. Midway through 1995–96, he signed for Dinamo București at the request of coach Cornel Dinu. During his period with the Red Dogs he failed to win any trophy, the team's best performance during his stay being a runner-up finish in 1998–99; he also made his debut in European competitions, appearing in four matches in the 1996 UEFA Intertoto Cup and two in the 1997–98 UEFA Cup.

=== Alavés ===
After three and a half campaigns with Dinamo, Contra was transferred for $800,000 to Deportivo Alavés in the Spanish La Liga. He was an important part in the Basques' runner-up run in the UEFA Cup, his performances earning him in a place in the UEFA Team of the Year.

Contra scored eight goals in all competitions during his spell at the Mendizorrotza Stadium. In December 2021, as the club celebrated its 100th birthday, he was voted its best-ever right-back by newspaper Noticias de Álava.

=== AC Milan and Atlético ===
In the summer of 2001, Contra moved to Italian club AC Milan, but his spell there lasted only one season. On 21 October, in the Derby della Madonnina against Inter Milan and as his team trailed 1–0, he was brought on as a 46th-minute substitute and scored once and provided one assist in the 4–2 victory. In August 2002, he was suspended after a scuffle with Juventus's Edgar Davids.

Contra returned to Spain in September 2002, joining Atlético Madrid. He appeared very rarely in the 2003–04 campaign, due to a serious ankle condition.

Contra signed for West Bromwich Albion on loan in August 2004, making his debut in a 2–1 defeat at Colchester United in the second round of the Football League Cup on 21 September. His maiden Premier League appearance occurred almost two months later, when they lost 2–1 at home against Middlesbrough.

Overall, the loan was not particularly successful, with Contra playing just six games and receiving a red card in his last match, a 0–5 home loss to Liverpool. He then returned to his country and Liga I, at the club which brought him up as a player, Politehnica Timișoara, where he managed to be recalled to the national side due to his performances.

=== Getafe ===
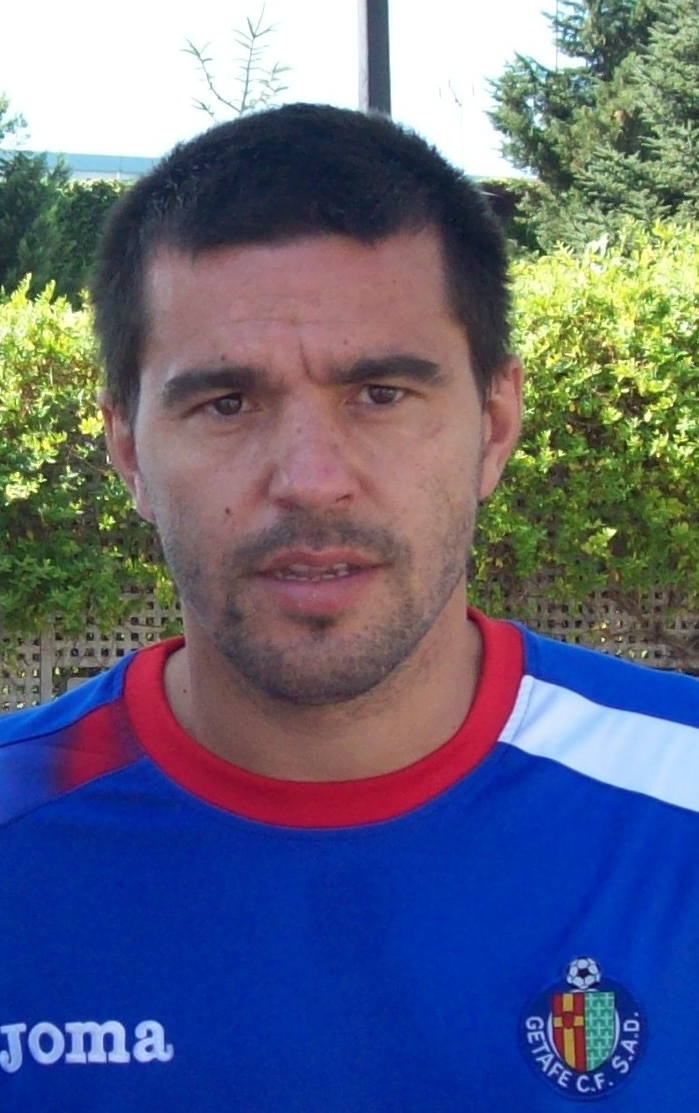
Contra with Spanish side Getafe in 2009

Contra returned to Spain in August 2005, agreeing to a season-long loan with Getafe which was subsequently made permanent (he was supposed to have arrived at the Coliseum Alfonso Pérez before, but the move was blocked because the squad had too many non-EU players, and his compatriot Gheorghe Craioveanu only ceased to be considered a foreigner the same year). He was used regularly by the Madrid outskirts side, battling for a first-team slot with David Cortés.

In the 2007–08 UEFA Cup, Contra netted in both legs of the quarter-final tie against Bayern Munich, which ended in a 4–4 aggregate elimination after extra time. Earlier in the competition, he scored a penalty kick against AEK Athens, appearing in that match even though his father had died just hours before.

=== Return to Politehnica ===
In late January 2010, after being ousted from the starting XI by manager Míchel, Contra left Getafe and returned to his country, rejoining hometown's Politehnica Timișoara initially until June. On 26 February he made his debut in his second spell for the club, scoring from a 30-yard free kick in the last minute of the 2–1 victory over Politehnica Iași. Two months later, at Steaua București, he again found the net from two set pieces, one from a penalty (3–3 draw); during his second stint, he played mainly as a central midfielder.

On 29 August 2010, Contra scored again from a free kick and again against Steaua, in a late 1–1 equaliser. His contract expired the following day, and on 9 September he agreed to a new deal, being announced as new player-coach six days later. His last game as a player took place on 13 November 2010, in a 1–1 home draw with Unirea Urziceni.

== International career ==
Contra earned 73 caps for Romania and scored seven goals, making his debut on 24 April 1996 at the age of 20 when coach Anghel Iordănescu brought him on in the 65th minute to replace captain Gheorghe Hagi in a friendly against Georgia which ended with a 5–0 victory. He played three games in the Euro 2000 qualifiers, being selected by Emerich Jenei to be part of the final tournament squad, where he was used as a starter the first three matches, helping the team get past the group stage, but did not play in the 2–0 loss to Italy in the quarter-finals, being suspended after receiving two yellow cards in the previous fixtures. He made nine appearances and netted twice in the 2002 FIFA World Cup qualifying phase, one in a 2–0 away victory over Georgia and one in the second leg of the play-off against Slovenia which was lost 3–2 on aggregate.

Contra made six appearances in the Euro 2004 qualifiers, scoring a hat-trick in the 7–0 away rout of Luxembourg, playing six times in the 2006 FIFA World Cup qualifying campaign. He contributed six matches and two goals, one in a 3–0 victory against Luxembourg and one in the 2–0 defeat of Slovenia in qualification for Euro 2008, being used in the final tournament by manager Victor Pițurcă in all the minutes as his side failed to progress from their group.

Contra played four games in the 2010 World Cup qualifiers and, on 1 April 2009, after a match with Austria, he announced his retirement from international football; however, on 30 August 2010, the 34-year-old was recalled by manager Răzvan Lucescu for the Euro 2012 qualifiers, making his last appearance in a 1–1 draw against Albania.

== Coaching career ==
=== Early career ===
Contra made his Timișoara debut as a manager in September 2010, with a win against Sportul Studențesc București. Even though the team never lost a game under his guidance, he was sacked after 11 matches – six wins, five draws – because of a conflict with the club's owner.

Contra returned to Spain in July 2012, being appointed at Segunda División B side Fuenlabrada. He started the campaign well and, after ten rounds, the team found themselves in a play-off position; however, after an offer from Petrolul Ploiești in his homeland arrived, he asked to be released from his contract.

=== Petrolul ===
Contra took over at Petrolul in October 2012, replacing Mircea Rednic. In his first season he reached the final of the Cupa României, defeating CFR Cluj 1–0; additionally, the club finished third in the domestic league, thus securing qualification for the Europa League after an 18-year-absence.

Petrolul managed to knock out Víkingur Gøta in the Europa League second qualifying round and Vitesse Arnhem in the third, but were eliminated in the play-offs by Swansea City after being bested 5–1 in Wales and winning 2–1 at home.

=== Getafe ===
On 10 March 2014, Contra returned to Getafe and the Spanish top flight after four years, replacing Luis García who was fired after a long run of bad results which led the team to only a point above the relegation zone, and without a league win since November. His first match in charge came four days later, a 3–3 home draw against Granada. They finally won a game on the penultimate day of the month, emerging victorious at Valencia 3–1.

On 19 May 2014, Contra confirmed survival for the side after a 2–1 away win over Rayo Vallecano.

=== Guangzhou R&F ===
On 18 December 2014, Contra was named as the new manager of Guangzhou R&F, replacing Sven-Göran Eriksson. He began working officially for the club on 4 January of the following year.

=== Alcorcón and Dinamo București ===
On 15 June 2016, Contra was appointed at Alcorcón. He was relieved of his duties on 12 October.

In February 2017, Contra became Dinamo București's new coach. He led the team to their first trophy in five years by winning the Cupa Ligii but, after advances from the Romanian Football Federation, he resigned from his post on 16 September.

=== Romania national team ===
On 17 September 2017, following Christoph Daum's dismissal, Contra was revealed as the new manager of Romania with the objective of qualifying for Euro 2020. His first game in charge was on 5 October, a 3–1 win in Ploiești against Kazakhstan in the 2018 FIFA World Cup qualifiers.

In November 2019, after the team could only finish in fourth place in the Euro 2020 qualifying phase behind Spain, Sweden and Norway, the Romanian Football Federation announced Contra would no longer continue on the bench.

=== Return to Dinamo ===
Contra returned to Dinamo București in August 2020, signing a two-year contract. He left on 3 December due to the club's financial problems.

=== Saudi Arabia ===
On 29 August 2021, Contra was appointed as manager of Al-Ittihad in the Saudi Pro League. His team led the league by 16 points over Al Hilal in February but ended the season two points behind that team, who he lost to twice.

Contra was dismissed by the Jeddah-based club in early July 2022. He was replaced by Nuno Espírito Santo.

On 6 March 2023, Contra joined Damac of the same country and league. He left in December of the following year.

Remaining in the division, Contra was then in charge of Al-Kholood for two weeks. After Harburg Group took over as the new owners, he was told he would not be retained.

=== Al-Arabi ===
On 15 October 2025, Contra became head coach of Qatar Stars League side Al-Arabi; the length of the contract was not disclosed.

== Career statistics ==
=== Club ===
Appearances and goals by club, season and competition
Club	Season	League			National Cup (Note: Includes Cupa României, Copa del Rey, Coppa Italia)		Europe		Other		Total	
Club	Season	Division	Apps	Goals	Apps	Goals	Apps	Goals	Apps	Goals	Apps	Goals
Politehnica Timișoara	1993–94	Divizia A	12	0	1	0	–		–		13	0
Politehnica Timișoara	1994–95	Divizia B	28	1	1	0	–		–		29	1
Politehnica Timișoara	1995–96	Divizia A	11	0	0	0	–		–		11	0
Politehnica Timișoara	Total		51	1	2	0	0	0	0	0	53	1
Dinamo București	1995–96	Divizia A	12	1	1	0	–		–		12	1
Dinamo București	1996–97	Divizia A	32	2	4	0	4 (Note: Appearances in UEFA Intertoto Cup)	0	–		40	2
Dinamo București	1997–98	Divizia A	28	3	4	0	2 (Note: Appearances in UEFA Cup)	0	–		34	3
Dinamo București	1998–99	Divizia A	29	2	3	0	–		–		32	2
Dinamo București	Total		101	8	12	0	6	0	0	0	119	8
Alavés	1999–00	La Liga	33	2	3	0	–		–		36	2
Alavés	2000–01	La Liga	33	3	0	0	11	3	–		44	6
Alavés	Total		66	5	3	0	11	3	0	0	80	8
AC Milan	2001–02	Serie A	29	3	4	0	10	1	–		43	4
AC Milan	2002–03	Serie A	–		–		1 (Note: Appearances in UEFA Champions League)	0	–		1	0
AC Milan	Total		29	3	4	0	11	1	0	0	44	4
Atlético Madrid	2002–03	La Liga	31	0	2	0	–		–		33	0
Atlético Madrid	2003–04	La Liga	3	0	2	0	–		–		5	0
Atlético Madrid	2004–05	La Liga	–		–		3	0	–		3	0
Atlético Madrid	Total		34	0	4	0	3	0	0	0	41	0
West Bromwich Albion (loan)	2004–05	Premier League	5	0	–		–		1 (Note: Appearances in League Cup)	0	6	0
Politehnica Timișoara (loan)	2004–05	Divizia A	14	0	–		–		–		14	0
Getafe (loan)	2005–06	La Liga	24	0	1	0	–		–		25	0
Getafe	2006–07	La Liga	21	0	4	0	–		–		25	0
Getafe	2007–08	La Liga	13	1	7	0	9	3	–		29	4
Getafe	2008–09	La Liga	27	2	2	0	–		–		29	2
Getafe	2009–10	La Liga	3	0	2	0	–		–		5	0
Getafe	Total		64	3	15	0	9	3	0	0	88	6
Politehnica Timișoara (loan)	2009–10	Liga I	13	3	–		–		–		13	3
Politehnica Timișoara	2009–10	Liga I	9	1	1	0	4 (Note: Appearances in UEFA Europa League)	0	–		14	1
Career total			410	24	42	0	44	7	1	0	497	31

=== International ===
Appearances and goals by national team and year
National team	Year	Apps	Goals
Romania	1996	3	0
Romania	1997	0	0
Romania	1998	2	0
Romania	1999	4	0
Romania	2000	10	0
Romania	2001	10	2
Romania	2002	7	3
Romania	2003	5	0
Romania	2004	2	0
Romania	2005	6	0
Romania	2006	6	0
Romania	2007	5	2
Romania	2008	9	0
Romania	2009	3	0
Romania	2010	1	0
Total		73	7

Scores and results list Romania's goal tally first, score column indicates score after each Contra goal.

List of international goals scored by Cosmin Contra
No.	Date	Venue	Opponent	Score	Result	Competition
1	28 March 2001	Boris Paichadze, Tbilisi, Georgia	Georgia	2–0	2–0	2002 World Cup qualification
2	14 November 2001	Ghencea, Bucharest, Romania	Slovenia	1–1	1–1	2002 World Cup qualification – Playoffs
3	16 October 2002	Josy Barthel, Luxembourg, Luxembourg	Luxembourg	4–0	7–0	Euro 2004 qualifying
4	16 October 2002	Josy Barthel, Luxembourg, Luxembourg	Luxembourg	5–0	7–0	Euro 2004 qualifying
5	16 October 2002	Josy Barthel, Luxembourg, Luxembourg	Luxembourg	7–0	7–0	Euro 2004 qualifying
6	28 March 2007	Stadionul Ceahlăul, Piatra Neamț, Romania	Luxembourg	2–0	3–0	Euro 2008 qualifying
7	6 June 2007	Dan Păltinișanu, Timișoara, Romania	Slovenia	2–0	2–0	Euro 2008 qualifying

== Managerial statistics ==
As of 3 September 2026

Managerial record by team and tenure
Team	Nat	From	To	Record							
Team	Nat	From	To	G	W	D	L	GF	GA	GD	Win %
Politehnica Timișoara	(Romania)	15 September 2010	5 December 2010	14	7	6	1	22	14	+8	50.00
Fuenlabrada	(Spain)	21 July 2012	29 October 2012	11	5	3	3	18	16	+2	45.45
Petrolul Ploiești	(Romania)	29 October 2012	10 March 2014	58	33	20	5	99	48	+51	56.90
Getafe	(Spain)	10 March 2014	4 January 2015	30	10	8	12	30	35	−5	33.33
Guangzhou R&F	(China)	4 January 2015	22 July 2015	30	9	7	14	37	45	−8	30.00
Alcorcón	(Spain)	15 June 2016	12 October 2016	11	4	3	4	6	9	−3	36.36
Dinamo București	(Romania)	16 February 2017	18 September 2017	28	15	7	6	41	24	+17	53.57
Romania	(Romania)	22 September 2017	18 November 2019	24	13	6	5	39	26	+13	54.17
Dinamo București	(Romania)	26 August 2020	3 December 2020	11	3	2	6	14	13	+1	27.27
Al-Ittihad	(Saudi Arabia)	29 August 2021	4 July 2022	30	20	5	5	62	31	+31	66.67
Damac	(Saudi Arabia)	6 March 2023	6 December 2024	64	21	17	26	82	95	−13	32.81
Al-Kholood	(Saudi Arabia)	2 July 2025	22 July 2025	0	0	0	0	0	0	+0	—
Al-Arabi	(Qatar)	15 October 2025	present	32	16	8	8	64	46	+18	50.00
Total				343	156	92	95	514	402	+112	45.48

== Honours ==
=== Player ===
Politehnica Timișoara

- Divizia B: 1994–95

Alavés

- UEFA Cup runner-up: 2000–01

Getafe

- Copa del Rey runner-up: 2006–07, 2007–08

Individual

- Romanian Footballer of the Year: 2001
- UEFA Team of the Year: 2001

=== Manager ===
Petrolul Ploiești

- Cupa României: 2012–13
- Supercupa României runner-up: 2013

Dinamo București

- Cupa Ligii: 2016–17

Al-Ittihad

- Saudi Pro League runner-up: 2021–22.

Individual

- Saudi Professional League Manager of the Month: February 2022
