= Stavros Georgiou =

Cypriot footballer (born 1972)

Personal information
- Full name: Stavros Georgiou
- Date of birth: September 14, 1972 (age 54)
- Place of birth: Famagusta, Cyprus
- Height: 1.85 m (6 ft 1 in)
- Positions: Right back; right winger

Senior career*
| Years | Team | Apps | (Gls) |
| 1996–1998 | Apollon Limassol | 21 | (3) |
| 1998–2002 | Ethnikos Achnas | 81 | (18) |
| 2002–2007 | APOEL | 103 | (19) |
| 2007 | Ethnikos Achnas | 7 | (0) |
| 2007–2012 | PAEEK FC | 58 | (6) |

International career^{‡}
| 2003–2005 | Cyprus | 10 | (1) |

Managerial career
- 2012–2013: PAEEK FC (assistant manager)
- 2013–2014: PAEEK FC
- 2014–: APOEL U-19
- 2023–: ETHNIKOS ASSIAS
- * Club domestic league appearances and goals as of May 2012 ‡ National team caps and goals as of August 13, 2005

Stavros Georgiou (Greek: Σταύρος Γεωργίου; born September 14, 1972) is a football manager and former international footballer. He is the current manager of Ethnikos Assias team.

He had a great career while playing for APOEL from 2002 to 2007, in which he won three Championships (2002, 2004, 2007), one Cup (2006) and one Super Cup (2004).

== International career ==
On 11 October 2003, Georgiou made his debut with the national team of Cyprus in the home draw 2–2 against Slovenia for UEFA Euro 2004 qualifyiers in which he scored his only goal.

=== International goals ===
Scores and results list Cyprus's goal tally first

| Goal | Date | Venue | Opponent | Score | Result | Competition |
|---|---|---|---|---|---|---|
| 1 | 11 October 2003 | Tsirion Stadium, Limassol | Slovenia | 1–2 | 2–2 | UEFA Euro 2004 qualifying |

== Managerial career ==
Stavros Georgiou started his managerial career in 2012 at PAEEK FC as assistant manager and the following year became the head coach of the club. In 2014, he appointed as manager of APOEL's U-19 team which competed in the 2014–15 UEFA Youth League.

== Honours ==
APOEL

- Cypriot First Division (3) : 2001–02, 2003–04, 2006–07
- Cypriot Cup (1) : 2005–06
- Cypriot Super Cup (1) : 2004
