= Omri Afek =

Israeli footballer (born 1979)

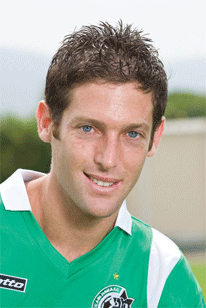

Personal information
- Full name: Omri Afek
- Date of birth: March 31, 1979 (age 47)
- Place of birth: Kiryat Ono, Israel
- Height: 1.83 m (6 ft 0 in)
- Positions: Midfielder; defender

Youth career
- Hapoel Kiryat Ono
- Hapoel Tel Aviv

Senior career*
Years	Team	Apps	(Gls)
1998–2003	Hapoel Tel Aviv	84	(14)
1998–1999	→ Maccabi Jaffa (loan)	17	(3)
2003–2005	Racing Santander	25	(2)
2004–2005	→ Salamanca (loan)	23	(0)
2005–2007	Beitar Jerusalem	27	(5)
2007–2009	Maccabi Haifa	35	(3)
2009–2011	Bnei Yehuda	31	(1)

International career
2000	Israel U21	4	(0)
2002–2006	Israel	27	(4)
- * Club domestic league appearances and goals

Omri Afek (Hebrew: עמרי אפק; born 31 March 1979) is a retired Israeli footballer who last played for Bnei Yehuda Tel Aviv.

Afek was mainly a midfielder that also operated as a defender.

== Early life ==
Afek was born in Kiryat Ono, Israel, to a Jewish family.

In June 2009, Afek graduated with a bachelor's degree in business administration from Ono Academic College.

== Football career ==
During his professional career, Afek played for Hapoel Tel Aviv, Maccabi Jaffa (loan), Beitar Jerusalem, Maccabi Haifa and Bnei Yehuda Tel Aviv.

He also had a two-year abroad spell at Racing de Santander; in 2003–04 La Liga, he signed alongside compatriot Dudu Aouate, both rejoining Yossi Benayoun - the club also sold that very summer a fourth Israeli, Ilan Bakhar. In his second year, Afek was loaned to Segunda División outfit UD Salamanca.

== Career statistics ==
=== International ===
Appearances and goals by national team and year
National team	Year	Apps	Goals
Israel	2002	3	2
Israel	2003	7	2
Israel	2004	9	0
Israel	2005	3	0
Israel	2006	5	0
Total		27	4

Scores and results list Israel's goal tally first, score column indicates score after each Afek goal.

List of international goals scored by Omri Afek
No.	Date	Venue	Opponent	Score	Result	Competition
1	21 August 2002	Darius and Girėnas Stadium, Kaunas, Lithuania	Lithuania	1–1	4–2	Friendly
2	21 August 2002	Darius and Girėnas Stadium, Kaunas, Lithuania	Lithuania	3–2	4–2	Friendly
3	29 March 2003	Tsirio Stadium, Limassol, Cyprus	Cyprus	1–0	1–1	UEFA Euro 2004 qualification
4	2 April 2003	Stadio Renzo Barbera, Palermo, Italy	France	1–0	1–2	UEFA Euro 2004 qualification

== Honours ==
- Israeli League: 1999–2000, 2006–07, 2008–09
- Israeli Cup: 1999–2000
- Toto Cup: 2007–08
