= Darren Debono =

Maltese former footballer

Personal information
- Date of birth: 9 January 1974 (age 52)
- Place of birth: Malta
- Position: Defender

Senior career*
Years	Team	Apps	(Gls)
1992–1993	Sliema Wanderers	17	(0)
1993–2004	Valletta	209	(4)
2004–2006	Sliema Wanderers	45	(1)

International career^{‡}
1996–2002	Malta	56	(0)
- * Club domestic league appearances and goals ‡ National team caps and goals as of 2 December 2013

Darren Debono (born 9 January 1974) is a Maltese former footballer.

== Football career ==
Debono won 56 international caps for the Malta national team from 1996 to 2002, during which time his club was Valletta F.C. In a 2000 friendly against England, his nose was broken by Alan Shearer's elbow.

== After football ==
After retiring from football, Debono ran a restaurant and owned fishing boats. In October 2017 he was arrested in Lampedusa and charged with involvement in smuggling oil from Libya.
