= Dragan Mladenović (footballer) =

Serbian football player

Personal information
- Full name: Dragan Mladenović
- Date of birth: 16 February 1976 (age 50)
- Place of birth: Kraljevo, SFR Yugoslavia
- Height: 1.90 m (6 ft 3 in)
- Position: Midfielder

Senior career*
Years	Team	Apps	(Gls)
1993–1995	Radnik Kraljevo	51	(4)
1995–1998	Sloga Kraljevo	60	(19)
1998–2002	Zemun	64	(5)
2000–2001	→ Rudar Pljevlja (loan)	26	(7)
2002–2004	Red Star Belgrade	50	(9)
2004–2005	Rangers	7	(0)
2004–2005	→ Real Sociedad (loan)	12	(0)
2005–2006	Red Star Belgrade	17	(3)
2006–2009	Incheon United	55	(5)

International career
2003–2005	Serbia and Montenegro	17	(1)
- * Club domestic league appearances and goals

Dragan Mladenović (Serbian Cyrillic: Драган Младеновић; born 16 February 1976) is a retired Serbian professional footballer.

== Career ==
Mladenović joined Rangers from Serbian champions Red Star Belgrade for £1.1m in August 2004. He made his Rangers debut against Hibernian on 21 August 2004. However, he failed to settle at Ibrox and was subsequently loaned out to Real Sociedad in January 2005. He was released by Rangers on August 30, despite having three years left on his contract, and re-joined Red Star Belgrade on a free transfer. This time he wasn't so successful. In 2006, Mladenović joined South Korean side Incheon United, where he continued playing until the 2009/10 season, after which he retired from professional football. Today he lives in Belgrade, Serbia, and currently is director of Red Star Belgrade youth academy.

== International career ==
Mladenović played seventeen matches for Serbia and Montenegro. He scored his only international goal on his debut as Serbia and Montenegro won 1–0 against Wales on 20 August 2003.
