= Emin Ağayev (footballer) =

Azerbaijani footballer and coach (born 1973)

Personal information
- Full name: Emin Rafael oğlu Ağayev
- Date of birth: 10 August 1973 (age 53)
- Place of birth: Baku, Azerbaijani SSR, Soviet Union
- Height: 1.80 m (5 ft 11 in)
- Position: Defender

Team information
- Current team: FC Kosmos Dolgoprudny (manager)

Senior career*
| Years | Team | Apps | (Gls) |
| 1990–1991 | Termist Baku | 28 | (0) |
| 1991–1993 | Neftchi Baku PFC | 56 | (6) |
| 1993–1998 | FC Anzhi Makhachkala | 185 | (10) |
| 1999–2001 | FC Torpedo-ZIL Moscow | 70 | (3) |
| 2002–2004 | FC Khimki | 68 | (3) |
| 2004 | FC Baltika Kaliningrad | 11 | (0) |
| 2005 | FC Dynamo Bryansk | 20 | (0) |
| 2005 | FC Nosta Novotroitsk | 10 | (0) |
| 2006–2007 | Olimpik Baku | 6 | (0) |
| 2007 | FC Nara-Desna Naro-Fominsk | 27 | (0) |
| 2008–2010 | FC Volga Tver | 90 | (2) |
| Total | | 565 | (24) |

International career
| 1992–2005 | Azerbaijan | 65 | (1) |

Managerial career
- 2011: FC Anzhi Makhachkala (scout)
- 2011–2014: FC Dagdizel Kaspiysk
- 2014: FC Domodedovo Moscow (assistant)
- 2015–2016: FC Volga Tver
- 2017–2018: FC Khimki (assistant)
- 2018–2022: Sabail (assistant)
- 2022–2023: FC Khimki (U19 assistant)
- 2023–2025: FC Khimki-M (assistant)
- 2025: FC Nart Cherkessk (assistant)
- 2026: FC Kosmos Dolgoprudny (assistant)
- 2026–: FC Kosmos Dolgoprudny
- * Club domestic league appearances and goals

Emin Rafael oğlu Ağayev (Russian: Эмин Рафаэль оглы Агаев; born 10 August 1973) is an Azerbaijani professional football coach and a former player. He also holds Russian citizenship. He is the manager of FC Kosmos Dolgoprudny.

== Club career ==
He made his debut in the Russian Premier League in 2001 for Torpedo-ZIL Moscow.

== Career statistics ==
=== International ===
Appearances and goals by national team and year
| National team | Year | Apps | Goals |
|---|---|---|---|
| Azerbaijan | 1992 | 1 | 0 |
| Azerbaijan | 1993 | 3 | 0 |
| Azerbaijan | 1994 | 4 | 0 |
| Azerbaijan | 1995 | 5 | 0 |
| Azerbaijan | 1996 | 7 | 0 |
| Azerbaijan | 1997 | 8 | 0 |
| Azerbaijan | 1998 | 9 | 1 |
| Azerbaijan | 1999 | 8 | 0 |
| Azerbaijan | 2000 | 6 | 0 |
| Azerbaijan | 2001 | 3 | 0 |
| Azerbaijan | 2002 | 3 | 0 |
| Azerbaijan | 2003 | 3 | 0 |
| Azerbaijan | 2004 | 4 | 0 |
| Azerbaijan | 2005 | 1 | 0 |
| Total | | 65 | 1 |

Scores and results list Azerbaijan's goal tally first, score column indicates score after each Ağayev goal.

List of international goals scored by Emin Ağayev
| No. | Date | Venue | Opponent | Score | Result | Competition |
|---|---|---|---|---|---|---|
| 1 | 12 August 1998 | Ganja City Stadium, Ganja, Azerbaijan | Georgia | 1–0 | 1–0 | Friendly |

== Honours ==
=== Club ===
Torpedo-ZIL Moscow

- Football Championship of the National League, Runner-up (1): 2000

=== Individual ===
- Azerbaijani Footballer of the Year: 2000
- Russian Second Division, Zone West best defender: 2009.
