= Finland national football team results (2000–2019) =

This is a list of the Finland national football team results from 2000 to 2019.

== Head-to-head record ==
As of 29 September 2026

Opponent	GP	W	D	L	GF	GA	GD	Win %
All Nations	795	211	159	425	942	1,648	−706	26.54

== Results ==
=== 2000 ===
31 January 2000 2000–01 Nordic Football Championship	Faroe Islands	0–1	Finland	La Manga, Spain
		Report	Sumiala 57'	Stadium: La Manga Stadium; Attendance: 102; Referee: Gylfi Orrason (Iceland)

2 February 2000 2000–01 Nordic Football Championship	Finland	0–1	Iceland	La Manga, Spain
		Report	Daðason 45'	Stadium: La Manga Stadium; Attendance: 350; Referee: Lassin Isaksen (Faroe Islands)

4 February 2000 2000–01 Nordic Football Championship	Denmark	1–2	Finland	La Manga, Spain
	Møller 71'	Report	Vasara 33', 89'	Stadium: La Manga Stadium; Attendance: 300; Referee: Karl-Erik Nilsson (Sweden)

20 February 2000 2000 King's Cup	Thailand	0–0	Finland	Bangkok, Thailand
19:10 UTC+7		Report		Stadium: Rajamangala Stadium; Attendance: 17,000; Referee: Pongsathorn Permpanich (Thailand)

23 February 2000 2000 King's Cup	Estonia	2–4	Finland	Bangkok, Thailand
21:15 UTC+7	Zelinski 71' (pen.); Oper 84'	Report	Kottila 12', 56'; Tuomela 14'; Kuqi 60'	Stadium: Rajamangala Stadium; Attendance: 20,000; Referee: Abdul Halim Hamid (Malaysia)

27 February 2000 2000 King's Cup	Thailand	5–1	Finland	Bangkok, Thailand
21:15 UTC+7	Anurak 22', 44', 81'; Pipat 25'; Thanunchai 56'	Report	Kallio 74'	Stadium: Rajamangala Stadium; Attendance: 15,000; Referee: Mohd Nazri Abdullah (Malaysia)

29 March 2000 Friendly	Wales	1–2	Finland	Cardiff, Wales
19:00 UTC+1	Giggs 60'	Report	Litmanen 21'; Blake 42' (o.g.)	Stadium: Millennium Stadium; Attendance: 65,614; Referee: Michael Ross (Northern Ireland)

26 April 2000 Friendly	Poland	0–0	Finland	Poznań, Poland
20:00 UTC+2				Stadium: Stadion Miejski; Attendance: 15,000; Referee: Juhos Attila (Hungary)

3 June 2000 Friendly	Latvia	1–0	Finland	Riga, Latvia
17:30 UTC+3	Pelcis 59'	Report		Stadium: Daugava Stadium; Attendance: 2,000; Referee: Aleh Chikun (Belarus)

16 August 2000 2000–01 Nordic Football Championship	Finland	3–1	Norway	Helsinki, Finland
20:00 UTC+3	Litmanen 24', 61'; Kuqi 90' (pen.)	Report	Helstad 54'	Stadium: Finnair Stadium; Attendance: 10,748; Referee: Mario van der Ende (Netherlands)

2 September 2000 2002 World Cup qualification	Finland	2–1	Albania	Helsinki, Finland
15:00 UTC+3	Litmanen 45'; Riihilahti 68'	Report	Murati 64'	Stadium: Finnair Stadium; Attendance: 10,770; Referee: René Temmink (Netherlands)

7 October 2000 2002 World Cup qualification	Greece	1–0	Finland	Athens, Greece
20:15 UTC+3	Lyberopoulos 59'	Report		Stadium: Olympic Stadium; Attendance: 15,000; Referee: Pierluigi Collina (Italy)

11 October 2000 2002 World Cup qualification	Finland	0–0	England	Helsinki, Finland
19:00 UTC+3		Report		Stadium: Helsinki Olympic Stadium; Attendance: 36,210; Referee: Alain Sars (France)

15 November 2000 Friendly	Republic of Ireland	3–0	Finland	Dublin, Ireland
19:30 UTC+0	Finnan 14'; Kilbane 85'; Staunton 90'	Report		Stadium: Lansdowne Road; Attendance: 22,368; Referee: Paul Durkin (England)

=== 2001 ===
1 February 2001 2000–01 Nordic Football Championship	Sweden	0–1	Finland	Jönköping, Sweden
19:00 UTC+1		Report	Marjamaa 37'	Stadium: Elmiahallen; Attendance: 2,196; Referee: Roy Helge Olsen (Norway)

15 February 2001 Friendly	Kuwait	4–3	Finland	Kuwait City, Kuwait
	Al-Salamah 9', 74'; Al-Huwaidi 42'; Al-Shammari 52'	Report	Kottila 2'; Grönlund 34'; Riihilahti 90'	Stadium: Al-Sadaqua Walsalam Stadium; Attendance: 2,000; Referee: Juma Al Ali (Qatar)

18 February 2001 Friendly	Oman	1–2	Finland	Muscat, Oman
	Saeed 40'	Report	Nuorela 58'; Riihilahti 78'	Stadium: Sultan Qaboos Sports Complex; Attendance: 1,215; Referee: Mohamed Al Muflah (Oman)

20 February 2001 Friendly	Oman	0–2	Finland	Muscat, Oman
		Report	Väisänen 6'; Niemi 52'	Stadium: Sultan Qaboos Sports Complex; Attendance: 1,000; Referee: Yousef Fadhil (Oman)

28 February 2001 Friendly	Luxembourg	0–1	Finland	Luxembourg City, Luxembourg
20:00 UTC+1		Report	Forssell 77'	Stadium: Stade Josy Barthel; Attendance: 1,674; Referee: Roland Beck (Liechtenstein)

24 March 2001 2002 World Cup qualification	England	2–1	Finland	Liverpool, England
15:00 UTC+0	Owen 44'; Beckham 50'	Report	Riihilahti 26'	Stadium: Anfield; Attendance: 44,262; Referee: Valentin Ivanov (Russia)

25 April 2001 Friendly	Hungary	0–0	Finland	Budapest, Hungary
20:30 UTC+2		Report		Stadium: Üllői úti Stadion; Attendance: 5,175; Referee: Fiorenzo Treossi (Italy)

9 May 2001 Friendly	Estonia	1–1	Finland	Kuressaare, Estonia
	Viikmäe 78'	Report	Rantanen 60'	Stadium: Kuressaare Linnastaadion; Attendance: 1,700; Referee: Andrejs Sipailo (Latvia)

2 June 2001 2002 World Cup qualification	Finland	2–2	Germany	Helsinki, Finland
20:00 UTC+3	Forssell 28', 43'	Report	Ballack 69' (pen.); Jancker 73'	Stadium: Helsinki Olympic Stadium; Attendance: 35,744; Referee: Dick Jol (Netherlands)

15 August 2001 Friendly	Finland	4–1	Belgium	Helsinki, Finland
19:00 UTC+3	Forssell 2'; Kolkka 14'; Litmanen 30' (pen.); Tihinen 79'	Report	Goor 37'	Stadium: Finnair Stadium; Attendance: 9,250; Referee: Hartmut Strampe (Germany)

1 September 2001 2002 World Cup qualification	Albania	0–2	Finland	Tirana, Albania
19:00 UTC+2		Report	Tainio 55'; Kuqi 90+3'	Stadium: Qemal Stafa Stadium; Attendance: 6,400; Referee: Erol Ersoy (Turkey)

5 September 2001 2002 World Cup qualification	Finland	5–1	Greece	Helsinki, Finland
19:00 UTC+3	Forssell 14', 45'; Riihilahti 21'; Kolkka 38'; Litmanen 53'	Report	Karagounis 30'	Stadium: Helsinki Olympic Stadium; Attendance: 27,216; Referee: Paul Allaerts (Belgium)

6 October 2001 2002 World Cup qualification	Germany	0–0	Finland	Gelsenkirchen, Germany
16:00 UTC+2		Report		Stadium: Arena AufSchalke; Attendance: 52,000; Referee: Anders Frisk (Sweden)

=== 2002 ===
4 January 2002 Bahrain Shoot Soccer Tournament	Bahrain	0–2	Finland	Riffa, Bahrain
		Report	Kottila 44'; Wiss 81'	Stadium: Bahrain National Stadium; Attendance: 5,000; Referee: Jassim Al Hail (Qatar)

7 January 2002 Bahrain Shoot Soccer Tournament	Finland	1–1	Albania	Riffa, Bahrain
	Fortuzi 71' (pen.)	Report	Ilola 45'	Stadium: Bahrain National Stadium; Attendance: 4,000; Referee: Yousuf Husain (Bahrain)

10 January 2002 Bahrain Shoot Soccer Tournament	Finland	3–0	Macedonia	Riffa, Bahrain
	Kottila 17', 25'; Niemi 23'	Report		Stadium: Bahrain National Stadium; Attendance: 100; Referee: Suleiman Abou Alo (Syria)

20 March 2002 Friendly	South Korea	2–0	Finland	Cartagena, Spain
	Hwang Sun-hong 86', 88'	Report		Stadium: Estadio Cartagonova; Attendance: 500; Referee: Víctor Esquinas Torres (Spain)

27 March 2002 Friendly	Portugal	1–4	Finland	Porto, Portugal
21:00 UTC+0	Conceição 40'	Report	Kolkka 9'; Forssell 27'; Litmanen 41', 53'	Stadium: Estádio do Bessa; Attendance: 7,000; Referee: Frank De Bleeckere (Belgium)

17 April 2002 Friendly	Macedonia	1–0	Finland	Prilep, Macedonia
16:00 UTC+2	Stavrevski 36'	Report		Stadium: Stadion Goce Delčev; Attendance: 5,000; Referee: Orhan Erdemir (Turkey)

22 May 2002 Friendly	Finland	2–1	Latvia	Helsinki, Finland
19:00 UTC+3	Riihilahti 70'; Pasanen 83'	Report	Pahars 39'	Stadium: Helsinki Olympic Stadium; Attendance: 8,617; Referee: Kristinn Jakobsson (Iceland)

21 August 2002 Friendly	Finland	0–3	Republic of Ireland	Helsinki, Finland
19:00 UTC+3		Report	Keane 12'; Healy 74'; Barrett 83'	Stadium: Helsinki Olympic Stadium; Attendance: 12,225; Referee: Rune Pedersen (Norway)

7 September 2002 Euro 2004 qualifying	Finland	0–2	Wales	Helsinki, Finland
19:00 UTC+3		Report	Hartson 30'; Davies 72'	Stadium: Helsinki Olympic Stadium; Attendance: 35,833; Referee: Konrad Plautz (Austria)

12 October 2002 Euro 2004 qualifying	Finland	3–0	Azerbaijan	Helsinki, Finland
19:00 UTC+3	Agaev 14' (o.g.); Tihinen 60'; Hyypiä 72'	Report		Stadium: Helsinki Olympic Stadium; Attendance: 11,853; Referee: Alain Hamer (Luxembourg)

16 October 2002 Euro 2004 qualifying	FR Yugoslavia	2–0	Finland	Belgrade, Serbia and Montenegro
19:00 UTC+2	Kovačević 55'; Mihajlović 84' (pen.)	Report		Stadium: Red Star Stadium; Attendance: 22,113; Referee: Dick van Egmond (Netherlands)

=== 2003 ===
26 January 2003 Friendly	Barbados	0–0	Finland	Saint Michael, Barbados
		Report		Stadium: Barbados National Stadium; Attendance: 5,000; Referee: Noel Bynoe (Trinidad and Tobago)

29 January 2003 Friendly	Trinidad and Tobago	1–2	Finland	Port of Spain, Trinidad and Tobago
19:00 UTC-4	Scotland 39'	Report	Kottila 79'; Forssell 82'	Stadium: Hasely Crawford Stadium; Attendance: 4,000; Referee: Mark Forde (Barbados)

12 February 2003 Friendly	Northern Ireland	0–1	Finland	Belfast, Northern Ireland
20:00 UTC+0		Report	Hyypiä 50'	Stadium: Windsor Park; Attendance: 6,137; Referee: Dougie McDonald (Scotland)

29 March 2003 Euro 2004 qualifying	Italy	2–0	Finland	Palermo, Italy
21:00 UTC+1	Vieri 6', 23'	Report		Stadium: Stadio Renzo Barbera; Attendance: 34,074; Referee: Valentin Ivanov (Russia)

30 April 2003 Friendly	Finland	3–0	Iceland	Vantaa, Finland
17:00 UTC+3	Litmanen 55'; Forssell 57'; Johansson 79'	Report		Stadium: Myyrmäen jalkapallostadion Attendance: 4,005; Referee: Peter Fröjdfeldt (Sweden)

22 May 2003 Friendly	Norway	2–0	Finland	Oslo, Norway
19:00 UTC+2	Leonhardsen 22'; T. Flo 80'	Report		Stadium: Ullevaal Stadion; Attendance: 13,436; Referee: Kenny Clark (Scotland)

7 June 2003 Euro 2004 qualifying	Finland	3–0	Serbia and Montenegro	Helsinki, Finland
19:00 UTC+3	Hyypiä 19'; Kolkka 45'; Forssell 56'	Report		Stadium: Helsinki Olympic Stadium; Attendance: 17,343; Referee: Claude Colombo (France)

11 June 2003 Euro 2004 qualifying	Finland	0–2	Italy	Helsinki, Finland
21:00 UTC+3		Report	Totti 31'; Del Piero 73'	Stadium: Helsinki Olympic Stadium; Attendance: 36,850; Referee: Željko Širić (Croatia)

20 August 2003 Friendly	Denmark	1–1	Finland	Copenhagen, Denmark
19:15 UTC+2	Grønkjær 42'	Report	Riihilahti 88'	Stadium: Parken Stadium; Attendance: 14,882; Referee: Mike McCurry (Scotland)

6 September 2003 Euro 2004 qualifying	Azerbaijan	1–2	Finland	Baku, Azerbaijan
19:00 UTC+5	Ismayilov 88'	Report	Tainio 52'; Nurmela 74'	Stadium: Shafa Stadium; Attendance: 6,500; Referee: Vladimír Hriňák (Slovakia)

10 September 2003 Euro 2004 qualifying	Wales	1–1	Finland	Cardiff, Wales
19:45 UTC+1	Davies 3'	Report	Forssell 79'	Stadium: Millennium Stadium; Attendance: 73,411; Referee: Arturo Daudén Ibáñez (Spain)

11 October 2003 Friendly	Finland	3–2	Canada	Tampere, Finland
17:00 UTC+3	Forssell 14'; Kolkka 16'; Tainio 32'	Report	Radzinski 74'; De Rosario 85'	Stadium: Tampere Stadium; Attendance: 5,530; Referee: Charlie Richmond (Scotland)

16 November 2003 Friendly	Finland	2–1	Honduras	Houston, United States
18:00 UTC-6	Tainio 60'; Hakanpää 68'	Report	Álvarez 87'	Stadium: Robertson Stadium; Attendance: 26,000; Referee: Brian Hall (United States)

19 November 2003 Friendly	Costa Rica	2–1	Finland	Alajuela, Costa Rica
20:00 UTC-6	Marín 15'; Saborío 72'	Report	Nurmela 62'	Stadium: Estadio Alejandro Morera Soto; Attendance: 3,000; Referee: Carlos Batres (Guatemala)

=== 2004 ===
3 February 2004 Friendly	China	2–1	Finland	Guangzhou, China
19:45 UTC+8	Zhang Yuning 42'; Hao Haidong 52'	Report	A. Eremenko 51'	Stadium: Tianhe Stadium; Attendance: 15,000; Referee: Lee Gi-Young (South Korea)

7 February 2004 Friendly	China	2–1	Finland	Shenzhen, China
17:30 UTC+8	Zhang Yuning 8'; Zheng Zhi 41'	Report	Kopteff 37'	Stadium: Shenzhen Stadium; Attendance: 18,000; Referee: Bae Jae-Yong (South Korea)

31 March 2004 Friendly	Malta	1–2	Finland	Ta' Qali, Malta
16:00 UTC+2	Mifsud 90+2'	Report	A. Eremenko 51'; Litmanen 86'	Stadium: Ta' Qali National Stadium; Attendance: 1,100; Referee: Matteo Trefoloni (Italy)

28 April 2004 Friendly	Bosnia and Herzegovina	1–0	Finland	Zenica, Bosnia and Herzegovina
20:00 UTC+2	Misimović 88'	Report		Stadium: Bilino Polje Stadium; Attendance: 21,000; Referee: Emil Božinovski (Macedonia)

28 May 2004 Friendly	Finland	1–3	Sweden	Tampere, Finland
20:00 UTC+3	Litmanen 8' (pen.)	Report	Andersson 19'; Allbäck 45', 81'	Stadium: Tampere Stadium; Attendance: 16,500; Referee: Alberto Undiano Mallenco (Spain)

18 August 2004 2006 World Cup qualification	Romania	2–1	Finland	Bucharest, Romania
20:30 UTC+3	Mutu 50'; Petre 90'	Report	A. Eremenko 90+3'	Stadium: Stadionul Giuleşti; Attendance: 17,500; Referee: Grzegorz Gilewski (Poland)

4 September 2004 2006 World Cup qualification	Finland	3–0	Andorra	Tampere, Finland
17:00 UTC+3	A. Eremenko 42', 64'; Riihilahti 58'	Report		Stadium: Tampere Stadium; Attendance: 7,437; Referee: Željko Širić (Croatia)

8 September 2004 2006 World Cup qualification	Armenia	0–2	Finland	Yerevan, Armenia
21:00 UTC+4		Report	Forssell 24'; A. Eremenko 67'	Stadium: Vazgen Sargsyan Republican Stadium; Attendance: 2,864; Referee: Paulius Malzinskas (Lithuania)

9 October 2004 2006 World Cup qualification	Finland	3–1	Armenia	Tampere, Finland
17:00 UTC+3	Kuqi 9', 87'; Eremenko 28'	Report	Shahgeldyan 32'	Stadium: Tampere Stadium; Attendance: 7,894; Referee: Herbert Fandel (Germany)

13 October 2004 2006 World Cup qualification	Netherlands	3–1	Finland	Amsterdam, Netherlands
20:30 UTC+2	Sneijder 39'; Van Nistelrooy 41', 63'	Report	Tainio 13'	Stadium: Amsterdam Arena; Attendance: 50,000; Referee: Stephen Bennett (England)

17 November 2004 Friendly	Italy	1–0	Finland	Messina, Italy
20:45 UTC+1	Miccoli 33'	Report		Stadium: Stadio San Filippo; Attendance: 7,043; Referee: Alexandru Tudor (Romania)

1 December 2004 2004 Prime Minister's Cup	Bahrain	1–2	Finland	Riffa, Bahrain
19:00 UTC+3	Ali 6'	Report	Pohja 9'; Huusko 67'	Stadium: Bahrain National Stadium; Attendance: 6,000; Referee: Talaat Najm (Lebanon)

3 December 2004 2004 Prime Minister's Cup	Finland	0–0 (3–4 p)	Oman	Riffa, Bahrain
		Report		Stadium: Bahrain National Stadium; Attendance: 3,000; Referee: Masoud Moradi (Iran)

=== 2005 ===
8 February 2005 2005 Cyprus Tournament	Finland	2–1	Latvia	Nicosia, Cyprus
18:45 UTC+2	Johansson 19'; Huusko 72'	Report	Zemļinskis 62' (pen.)	Stadium: GSP Stadium; Attendance: 50; Referee: Panikos Kailis (Cyprus)

9 February 2005 2005 Cyprus Tournament	Cyprus	1–2	Finland	Nicosia, Cyprus
18:45 UTC+2	Michael 24'	Report	Roiha 66', 70'	Stadium: GSP Stadium; Attendance: 1,502; Referee: Romāns Lajuks (Latvia)

12 March 2005 Friendly	Kuwait	0–1	Finland	Kuwait City, Kuwait
20:00 UTC+3		Report	Kuqi 16'	Stadium: Al Kuwait Sports Club Stadium; Attendance: 1,500; Referee: Adel Al Shatti (Kuwait)

18 March 2005 Friendly	Saudi Arabia	1–4	Finland	Dammam, Saudi Arabia
19:45 UTC+3	Al-Bashah 48'	Report	Kuivasto 4'; Kuqi 71', 78'; Nurmela 75'	Stadium: Prince Mohamed bin Fahd Stadium; Attendance: 8,000; Referee: Abdulrahman Al Amri (Saudi Arabia)

26 March 2005 2006 World Cup qualification	Czech Republic	4–3	Finland	Teplice, Czech Republic
17:00 UTC+1	Baroš 7'; Rosický 34'; Polák 58'; Lokvenc 87'	Report	Litmanen 46'; Riihilahti 73'; Johansson 79'	Stadium: Na Stinadlech; Attendance: 16,200; Referee: Claus Bo Larsen (Denmark)

2 June 2005 Friendly	Finland	0–1	Denmark	Tampere, Finland
20:00 UTC+3		Report	Silberbauer 90'	Stadium: Tampere Stadium; Attendance: 9,238; Referee: Jan Wegereef (Netherlands)

8 June 2005 2006 World Cup qualification	Finland	0–4	Netherlands	Helsinki, Finland
21:00 UTC+3		Report	Van Nistelrooy 36'; Kuyt 76'; Cocu 85'; Van Persie 87'	Stadium: Helsinki Olympic Stadium; Attendance: 37,786; Referee: Alain Hamer (Luxembourg)

17 August 2005 2006 World Cup qualification	Macedonia	0–3	Finland	Skopje, Macedonia
20:00 UTC+2		Report	Eremenko 8', 45'; Roiha 87'	Stadium: Skopje City Stadium; Attendance: 6,800; Referee: Matt Messias (England)

3 September 2005 2006 World Cup qualification	Andorra	0–0	Finland	Aixovall, Andorra
16:00 UTC+2		Report		Stadium: Estadi Comunal d'Aixovall; Attendance: 860; Referee: Johny Ver Eecke (Belgium)

7 September 2005 2006 World Cup qualification	Finland	5–1	Macedonia	Tampere, Finland
19:00 UTC+3	Forssell 10', 12', 61'; Tihinen 41'; Eremenko 54'	Report	Maznov 48'	Stadium: Tampere Stadium; Attendance: 6,467; Referee: Kristinn Jakobsson (Iceland)

8 October 2005 2006 World Cup qualification	Finland	0–1	Romania	Helsinki, Finland
17:00 UTC+3		Report	Mutu 41' (pen.)	Stadium: Helsinki Olympic Stadium; Attendance: 11,500; Referee: Anton Guenov (Bulgaria)

12 October 2005 2006 World Cup qualification	Finland	0–3	Czech Republic	Helsinki, Finland
18:30 UTC+3		Report	Jun 6'; Rosický 51'; Heinz 58'	Stadium: Helsinki Olympic Stadium; Attendance: 11,234; Referee: Manuel Mejuto González (Spain)

12 November 2005 Friendly	Finland	2–2	Estonia	Helsinki, Finland
14:30 UTC+2	Sjölund 7'; Arkivuo 59'	Report	Kruglov 62' (pen.); Lindpere 85'	Stadium: Finnair Stadium; Attendance: 1,904; Referee: Grzegorz Gilewski (Poland)

=== 2006 ===
21 January 2006 2006 LG Cup	Saudi Arabia	1–1	Finland	Riyadh, Saudi Arabia
19:00 UTC+3	Al-Shalhoub 58'	Report	Roiha 87'	Stadium: Prince Faisal bin Fahd Stadium; Attendance: 3,000; Referee: Naser Al Enezi (Kuwait)

25 January 2006 2006 LG Cup	South Korea	1–0	Finland	Riyadh, Saudi Arabia
16:40 UTC+3	Park Chu-young 46'	Report		Stadium: King Fahd Sports City Stadium; Attendance: 200; Referee: Abdulrahman Al Amri (Saudi Arabia)

18 February 2006 Friendly	Japan	2–0	Finland	Fukuroi, Japan
19:15 UTC+9	Kubo 48'; Ogasawara 57'	Report		Stadium: Shizuoka Stadium; Attendance: 40,702; Referee: Lee Gi-young (South Korea)

28 February 2006 2006 Cyprus Tournament	Finland	0–0 (1–3 p)	Kazakhstan	Larnaca, Cyprus
17:00 UTC+2		Report		Stadium: GSZ Stadium; Attendance: 100; Referee: Leontios Trattou (Cyprus)

1 March 2006 2006 Cyprus Tournament	Belarus	2–2 (4–5 p)	Finland	Paphos, Cyprus
19:00 UTC+2	Karnilenka 34'; Shkabara 53'	Report	Riihilahti 82'; Forssell 90'	Stadium: Pafiako Stadium; Attendance: 30; Referee: Robert Krajnc (Slovenia)

25 May 2006 Friendly	Sweden	0–0	Finland	Gothenburg, Sweden
15:00 UTC+2		Report		Stadium: Ullevi; Attendance: 25,754; Referee: Grzegorz Gilewski (Poland)

16 August 2006 Friendly	Finland	1–2	Northern Ireland	Helsinki, Finland
17:00 UTC+3	Väyrynen 74'	Report	Healy 34'; Lafferty 64'	Stadium: Helsinki Olympic Stadium; Attendance: 12,456; Referee: Michael Svendsen (Denmark)

2 September 2006 Euro 2008 qualifying	Poland	1–3	Finland	Bydgoszcz, Poland
20:30 CEST	Garguła 89'	Report	Litmanen 54', 76' (pen.); Väyrynen 84'	Stadium: Zdzisław Krzyszkowiak Stadium; Attendance: 13,000; Referee: Laurent Duhamel (France)

6 September 2006 Euro 2008 qualifying	Finland	1–1	Portugal	Helsinki, Finland
20:00 EEST	Johansson 22'	Report	Nuno Gomes 42'	Stadium: Helsinki Olympic Stadium; Attendance: 38,015; Referee: Konrad Plautz (Austria)

7 October 2006 Euro 2008 qualifying	Armenia	0–0	Finland	Yerevan, Armenia
21:00 UTC+5		Report		Stadium: Vazgen Sargsyan Republican Stadium; Attendance: 2,800; Referee: Damir Skomina (Slovenia)

11 October 2006 Euro 2008 qualifying	Kazakhstan	0–2	Finland	Almaty, Kazakhstan
22:00 UTC+6			Litmanen 29'; Hyypiä 64'	Stadium: Almaty Central Stadium; Attendance: 17,863; Referee: Athanassios Briakos (Greece)

15 November 2006 Euro 2008 qualifying	Finland	1–0	Armenia	Helsinki, Finland
19:00 EET	Nurmela 10'	Report		Stadium: Telia 5G -areena Attendance: 9,445; Referee: Craig Thomson (Scotland)

=== 2007 ===
28 March 2007 Euro 2008 qualifying	Azerbaijan	1–0	Finland	Baku, Azerbaijan
20:00 UTC+5	Imamaliev 83'	Report		Stadium: Tofiq Bahramov Republican Stadium; Attendance: 14,500; Referee: Domenico Messina (Italy)

2 June 2007 Euro 2008 qualifying	Finland	0–2	Serbia	Helsinki, Finland
19:15 EEST		Report	Janković 3'; Jovanović 86'	Stadium: Helsinki Olympic Stadium; Attendance: 33,615; Referee: Manuel Mejuto González (Spain)

6 June 2007 Euro 2008 qualifying	Finland	2–0	Belgium	Helsinki, Finland
20:15 EEST	Johansson 27'; A. Eremenko 71'	Report		Stadium: Helsinki Olympic Stadium; Attendance: 34,818; Referee: Mike Riley (England)

22 August 2007 Euro 2008 qualifying	Finland	2–1	Kazakhstan	Tampere, Finland
19:00 EEST	A. Eremenko 13'; Tainio 61'	Report	Byakov 23'	Stadium: Tampere Stadium; Attendance: 13,047; Referee: Viktor Kassai (Hungary)

8 September 2007 Euro 2008 qualifying	Serbia	0–0	Finland	Belgrade, Serbia
20:15 CEST		Report		Stadium: Red Star Stadium; Attendance: 10,530; Referee: Eric Braamhaar (Netherlands)

12 September 2007 Euro 2008 qualifying	Finland	0–0	Poland	Helsinki, Finland
19:00 EEST		Report		Stadium: Helsinki Olympic Stadium; Attendance: 34,088; Referee: Herbert Fandel (Germany)

13 October 2007 Euro 2008 qualifying	Belgium	0–0	Finland	Brussels, Belgium
20:45 CEST		Report		Stadium: King Baudouin Stadium; Attendance: 21,393; Referee: Costas Kapitanis (Cyprus)

17 October 2007 Friendly	Finland	0–0	Spain	Helsinki, Finland
20:30 UTC+3		Report		Stadium: Helsinki Olympic Stadium; Attendance: 11,751; Referee: Stéphane Bré (France)

17 November 2007 Euro 2008 qualifying	Finland	2–1	Azerbaijan	Helsinki, Finland
16:05 EET	Forssell 79'; Kuqi 86'	Report	Gurbanov 63'	Stadium: Helsinki Olympic Stadium; Attendance: 10,325; Referee: Alain Hamer (Luxembourg)

21 November 2007 Euro 2008 qualifying	Portugal	0–0	Finland	Porto, Portugal
19:45 WET		Report		Stadium: Estádio do Dragão; Attendance: 49,000; Referee: Ľuboš Micheľ (Slovakia)

=== 2008 ===
2 February 2008 2008 Cyprus Tournament	Poland	1–0	Finland	Pafos, Cyprus
16:00 UTC+1	Kokoszka 43'	Report		Stadium: Pafiako Stadium; Attendance: 300; Referee: Kostas Kapitanis (Cyprus)

6 February 2008 2008 Cyprus Tournament	Finland	1–2	Greece	Nicosia, Cyprus
20:00 UTC+2	Litmanen 66'	Report	Charisteas 67'; Katsouranis 72'	Stadium: GSP Stadium; Attendance: 3,000; Referee: Panayiotis Kailis (Cyprus)

26 March 2008 Friendly	Bulgaria	2–1	Finland	Sofia, Bulgaria
18:00 UTC+2	Lazarov 49'; Genchev 90'	Report	Litmanen 22' (pen.)	Stadium: Vasil Levski National Stadium; Attendance: 2,500; Referee: Alexandru Tudor (Romania)

29 May 2008 Friendly	Finland	0–2	Turkey	Duisburg, Germany
20:30 UTC+2		Report	Şanlı 15'; Şentürk 88'	Stadium: MSV Arena; Attendance: 15,036; Referee: Thorsten Kinhöfer (Germany)

2 June 2008 Friendly	Finland	1–1	Belarus	Turku, Finland
19:00 UTC+3	Kallio 90+4'	Report	Shytaw 90+2'	Stadium: Veritas Stadium; Attendance: 6,474; Referee: Damir Skomina (Slovenia)

20 August 2008 Friendly	Finland	2–0	Israel	Tampere, Finland
19:00 UTC+3	Johansson 42', 88'	Report		Stadium: Tampere Stadium; Attendance: 4,929; Referee: Johannes Valgeirsson (Iceland)

10 September 2008 2010 World Cup qualification	Finland	3–3	Germany	Helsinki, Finland
20:35 UTC+3	Johansson 33'; Väyrynen 43'; Sjölund 53'	Report	Klose 38', 45', 83'	Stadium: Helsinki Olympic Stadium; Attendance: 37,150; Referee: Viktor Kassai (Hungary)

11 October 2008 2010 World Cup qualification	Finland	1–0	Azerbaijan	Helsinki, Finland
17:00 UTC+3	Forssell 61' (pen.)	Report		Stadium: Helsinki Olympic Stadium; Attendance: 22,480; Referee: William Collum (Scotland)

15 October 2008 2010 World Cup qualification	Russia	3–0	Finland	Moscow, Russia
19:00 UTC+4	Pasanen 23' (o.g.); Lampi 65' (o.g.); Arshavin 88'	Report		Stadium: Lokomotiv Stadium; Attendance: 28,000; Referee: Kyros Vassaras (Greece)

19 November 2008 Friendly	Switzerland	1–0	Finland	St. Gallen, Switzerland
20:30 UTC+1	Ziegler 84'	Report		Stadium: AFG Arena; Attendance: 11,500; Referee: Aleksei Kulbakov (Belarus)

=== 2009 ===
4 February 2009 Friendly	Japan	5–1	Finland	Tokyo, Japan
	Okazaki 15', 32'; Kagawa 44'; Nakazawa 57'; Yasuda 87'	Report	Porokara 52'	Stadium: National Stadium; Attendance: 34,532; Referee: Huang Junjie (China)

11 February 2009 Friendly	Portugal	1–0	Finland	Loulé, Portugal
20:45 UTC+0	Ronaldo 78' (pen.)	Report		Stadium: Estádio Algarve; Attendance: 19,834; Referee: Carlo Bertolini (Switzerland)

28 March 2009 2010 World Cup qualification	Wales	0–2	Finland	Cardiff, Wales
15:00 UTC+0		Report	Johansson 42'; Kuqi 90+1'	Stadium: Millennium Stadium; Attendance: 22,604; Referee: Eduardo Iturralde González (Spain)

1 April 2009 Friendly	Norway	3–2	Finland	Oslo, Norway
19:00 UTC+2	J. Riise 56'; Høiland 90'; Pedersen 90+2'	Report	Johansson 39'; A. Eremenko 90+1'	Stadium: Ullevaal Stadion; Attendance: 16,239; Referee: Rob Styles (England)

6 June 2009 2010 World Cup qualification	Finland	2–1	Liechtenstein	Helsinki, Finland
19:00 UTC+3	Forssell 33'; Johansson 71'	Report	Frick 13'	Stadium: Helsinki Olympic Stadium; Attendance: 20,319; Referee: Libor Kovařík (Czech Republic)

10 June 2009 2010 World Cup qualification	Finland	0–3	Russia	Helsinki, Finland
20:30 UTC+3		Report	Kerzhakov 26', 53'; Zyryanov 71'	Stadium: Helsinki Olympic Stadium; Attendance: 37,028; Referee: Konrad Plautz (Austria)

12 August 2009 Friendly	Sweden	1–0	Finland	Solna, Sweden
UTC+2	Elmander 42'	Report		Stadium: Råsunda Stadium; Attendance: 15,212; Referee: Fredy Fautrel (France)

5 September 2009 2010 World Cup qualification	Azerbaijan	1–2	Finland	Lankaran, Azerbaijan
20:00 UTC+5	Məmmədov 49'	Report	Tihinen 74'; Johansson 85'	Stadium: Lankaran City Stadium; Attendance: 12,000; Referee: Stelios Trifonos (Cyprus)

9 September 2009 2010 World Cup qualification	Liechtenstein	1–1	Finland	Vaduz, Liechtenstein
19:30 UTC+2	Polverino 75'	Report	Litmanen 74' (pen.)	Stadium: Rheinpark Stadion; Attendance: 3,132; Referee: Novo Panić (Bosnia and Herzegovina)

10 October 2009 2010 World Cup qualification	Finland	2–1	Wales	Helsinki, Finland
17:00 UTC+3	Porokara 5'; Moisander 77'	Report	Bellamy 17'	Stadium: Helsinki Olympic Stadium; Attendance: 14,000; Referee: Milorad Mažić (Serbia)

14 October 2009 2010 World Cup qualification	Germany	1–1	Finland	Hamburg, Germany
20:00 UTC+2	Podolski 90'	Report	Johansson 11'	Stadium: HSH Nordbank Arena; Attendance: 1,858; Referee: Sten Kaldma (Estonia)

=== 2010 ===
18 January 2010 Friendly	South Korea	2–0	Finland	Málaga, Spain
15:30 UTC+1	Oh Beom-seok 39'; Lee Jung-soo 61'	Report		Stadium: Estadio Ciudad de Málaga; Attendance: 270; Referee: Fernandez Borbalon (Spain)

3 March 2010 Friendly	Malta	1–2	Finland	Ta' Qali, Malta
19:00 UTC+1	Mifsud 17'	Report	R. Eremenko 66' (pen.); Väyrynen 70'	Stadium: Ta' Qali National Stadium; Attendance: 1,050; Referee: Mauro Bergonzi (Italy)

21 May 2010 Friendly	Estonia	2–0	Finland	Tallinn, Estonia
19:00 UTC+3	Oper 5'; Post 55'	Report		Stadium: A. Le Coq Arena; Attendance: 5,650; Referee: István Vad (Hungary)

29 May 2010 Friendly	Poland	0–0	Finland	Kielce, Poland
17:00 UTC+2		Report		Stadium: Stadion Miejski; Attendance: 14,000; Referee: Marius Avram (Romania)

11 August 2010 Friendly	Finland	1–0	Belgium	Turku, Finland
20:00 UTC+3	Porokara 13'	Report		Stadium: Veritas Stadium; Attendance: 7,451; Referee: Alain Hamer (Luxembourg)

3 September 2010 Euro 2012 qualifying	Moldova	2–0	Finland	Chișinău, Moldova
19:30 UTC+3	Suvorov 69'; Doroș 74'	Report		Stadium: Zimbru Stadium; Attendance: 10,300; Referee: Robert Małek (Poland)

7 September 2010 Euro 2012 qualifying	Netherlands	2–1	Finland	Rotterdam, Netherlands
20:30 UTC+2	Huntelaar 7', 16' (pen.)	Report	Forssell 18'	Stadium: De Kuip; Attendance: 25,000; Referee: Alexey Nikolaev (Russia)

12 October 2010 Euro 2012 qualifying	Finland	1–2	Hungary	Helsinki, Finland
18:30 UTC+3	Forssell 86'	Report	Szalai 50'; Dzsudzsák 90+4'	Stadium: Helsinki Olympic Stadium; Attendance: 18,532; Referee: Alan Kelly (Ireland)

17 November 2010 Euro 2012 qualifying	Finland	8–0	San Marino	Helsinki, Finland
18:30 UTC+3	Väyrynen 39'; Hämäläinen 49', 67'; Forssell 51', 59', 78'; Litmanen 71' (pen.); Porokara 73'	Report		Stadium: Helsinki Olympic Stadium; Attendance: 8,192; Referee: Radek Matějek (Czech Republic)

=== 2011 ===
9 February 2011 Friendly	Belgium	1–1	Finland	Ghent, Belgium
19:00 UTC+1	Witsel 61'	Report	Porokara 90+3'	Stadium: Jules Ottenstadion; Attendance: 12,800; Referee: Cyril Zimmermann (Switzerland)

29 March 2011 Friendly	Portugal	2–0	Finland	Aveiro, Portugal
20:45 UTC+1	Micael 10', 71'	Report		Stadium: Estádio Municipal; Attendance: 13,737; Referee: Stephan Studer (Switzerland)

3 June 2011 Euro 2012 qualifying	San Marino	0–1	Finland	Serravalle, San Marino
20:30 UTC+2		Report	Forssell 41'	Stadium: Stadio Olimpico; Attendance: 1,218; Referee: Andrejs Sipailo (Latvia)

7 June 2011 Euro 2012 qualifying	Sweden	5–0	Finland	Solna, Sweden
20:00 UTC+2	Källström 12'; Ibrahimović 31', 35', 53'; Bajrami 84'	Report		Stadium: Råsunda Stadium; Attendance: 32,128; Referee: Antony Gautier (France)

10 August 2011 Friendly	Latvia	0–2	Finland	Riga, Latvia
19:30 UTC+3		Report	Hämäläinen 58'; Furuholm 87'	Stadium: Skonto Stadium; Attendance: 5,314; Referee: Vladislav Bezborodov (Russia)

2 September 2011 Euro 2012 qualifying	Finland	4–1	Moldova	Helsinki, Finland
18:30 UTC+3	Hämäläinen 11', 43'; Forssell 52' (pen.); Armaș 71' (o.g.)	Report	Alexeev 85'	Stadium: Helsinki Olympic Stadium; Attendance: 9,056; Referee: Anastassios Kakos (Greece)

6 September 2011 Euro 2012 qualifying	Finland	0–2	Netherlands	Helsinki, Finland
20:00 UTC+3		Report	Strootman 29'; L. de Jong 90+3'	Stadium: Helsinki Olympic Stadium; Attendance: 21,580; Referee: Manuel Gräfe (Germany)

7 October 2011 Euro 2012 qualifying	Finland	1–2	Sweden	Helsinki, Finland
19:15 UTC+3	Toivio 73'	Report	Larsson 8'; M. Olsson 52'	Stadium: Helsinki Olympic Stadium; Attendance: 23,257; Referee: Mark Clattenburg (England)

11 October 2011 Euro 2012 qualifying	Hungary	0–0	Finland	Budapest, Hungary
20:00 UTC+2		Report		Stadium: Stadium Puskás Ferenc; Attendance: 25,169; Referee: Alberto Undiano Mallenco (Spain)

15 November 2011 Friendly	Denmark	2–1	Finland	Esbjerg, Denmark
20:15 UTC+1	Agger 57'; Bendtner 59'	Report	Eremenko 18'	Stadium: Blue Water Arena; Attendance: 14,137; Referee: Kristinn Jakobsson (Iceland)

=== 2012 ===
22 January 2012 Friendly	Trinidad and Tobago	2–3	Finland	Port of Spain, Trinidad and Tobago
17:00 UTC-4	Williams 32'; Molino 67'	Report	Riski 33'; Kolehmainen 75'; Ääritalo 78'	Stadium: Hasely Crawford Stadium; Attendance: 400; Referee: Courtney Campbell (Jamaica)

29 February 2012 Friendly	Austria	3–1	Finland	Klagenfurt, Austria
20:30 UTC+2	Janko 32'; Harnik 54'; Ivanschitz 73'	Report	Furuholm 89'	Stadium: Wörthersee Stadion; Attendance: 10,200; Referee: Paolo Valeri (Italy)

26 May 2012 Friendly	Finland	3–2	Turkey	Wals-Siezenheim, Austria
20:00 UTC+2	R. Eremenko 19'; Pukki 72'; Hetemaj 90+1'	Report	Yılmaz 21', 54'	Stadium: Red Bull Arena; Attendance: 1,000; Referee: Manuel Schüttengruber (Austria)

1 June 2012 2012 Baltic Cup	Estonia	1–2	Finland	Tartu, Estonia
20:30 UTC+3	Oper 33'	Report	Kuqi 10', 22'	Stadium: Tamme Stadium; Attendance: 2,470; Referee: Vadims Direktorenko (Latvia)

3 June 2012 2012 Baltic Cup	Finland	1–1 (5–6 p)	Latvia	Võru, Estonia
13:30 UTC+3	Kolehmainen 52'	Report	Gauračs 54'	Stadium: Võru Stadium; Attendance: 280; Referee: Gediminas Mažeika (Lithuanian)
	Penalties
	Pukki (penalty missed); Sjölund (penalty scored); Kuqi (penalty scored); Ojala (penalty scored); Pasanen (penalty scored); Sparv (penalty scored); Hurme (penalty missed); Kolehmainen (penalty missed)		(penalty missed) Cauņa; (penalty scored) Smirnovs; (penalty scored) Laizāns; (penalty scored) Kamešs; (penalty scored) Zjuzins; (penalty scored) Kļava; (penalty missed) Bulvītis; (penalty scored) Kozlovs

15 August 2012 Friendly	Northern Ireland	3–3	Finland	Belfast, Northern Ireland
19:45 UTC+1	Ferguson 7'; Lafferty 19'; Paterson 83' (pen.)	Report	Sparv 22'; Pukki 24'; Hetemaj 78'	Stadium: Windsor Park; Attendance: 9,575; Referee: Richard Liesveld (Netherlands)

7 September 2012 2014 World Cup qualification	Finland	0–1	France	Helsinki, Finland
21:30 UTC+3		Report	Diaby 20'	Stadium: Helsinki Olympic Stadium; Attendance: 35,111; Referee: Craig Thomson (Scotland)

11 September 2012 Friendly	Czech Republic	0–1	Finland	Teplice, Czech Republic
18:00 UTC+2		Report	Pukki 43'	Stadium: Na Stínadlech; Attendance: 9,053; Referee: Hubert Siejewicz (Poland)

12 October 2012 2014 World Cup qualification	Finland	1–1	Georgia	Helsinki, Finland
18:30 UTC+3	Hämäläinen 62'	Report	Kashia 56'	Stadium: Helsinki Olympic Stadium; Attendance: 12,607; Referee: Yevhen Aranovskiy (Ukraine)

14 November 2012 Friendly	Cyprus	0–3	Finland	Nicosia, Cyprus
19:00 UTC+2		Report	Pukki 15'; Hetemaj 29' (pen.); Kolehmainen 85'	Stadium: GSP Stadium; Attendance: 300; Referee: Cristian Balaj (Romania)

=== 2013 ===
23 January 2013 2013 King's Cup	Thailand	1–3	Finland	Chiang Mai, Thailand
19:00 UTC+7	Narubadin 12'	Report	Sumusalo 5'; Forssell 12', 87'	Stadium: 700th Anniversary Stadium; Attendance: 23,000; Referee: Vo Minh Tri (Vietnam)

26 January 2013 2013 King's Cup	Finland	0–3	Sweden	Chiang Mai, Thailand
17:00 UTC+7		Report	Hysén 23'; Quaison 73'; Svensson 90'	Stadium: 700th Anniversary Stadium; Attendance: 5,000; Referee: Chaiya Mahapab (Thailand)

6 February 2013 Friendly	Israel	2–1	Finland	Netanya, Israel
20:00 UTC+2	Ben Basat 2'; Refaelov 90+3'	Report	Forsell 87'	Stadium: Netanya Stadium; Attendance: 6,150; Referee: Padraigh Sutton (Ireland)

22 March 2013 2014 World Cup qualification	Spain	1–1	Finland	Gijón, Spain
20:45 UTC+1	Ramos 49'	Report	Pukki 79'	Stadium: El Molinón; Attendance: 27,637; Referee: Ovidiu Hațegan (Romania)

26 March 2013 Friendly	Luxembourg	0–3	Finland	Luxembourg City, Luxembourg
19:30 UTC+2		Report	Ring 43'; Forssell 51' (pen.); Toivio 90'	Stadium: Stade Josy Barthel; Attendance: 856; Referee: Jonathan Lardot (Belgium)

7 June 2013 2014 World Cup qualification	Finland	1–0	Belarus	Helsinki, Finland
19:00 UTC+3	Shitov 57' (o.g.)	Report		Stadium: Helsinki Olympic Stadium; Attendance: 24,916; Referee: Eli Hacmon (Israel)

11 June 2013 2014 World Cup qualification	Belarus	1–1	Finland	Gomel, Belarus
20:00 UTC+3	Verkhovtsov 85'	Report	Pukki 24'	Stadium: Central Stadium; Attendance: 10,100; Referee: Libor Kovařík (Czech Republic)

14 August 2013 Friendly	Finland	2–0	Slovenia	Turku, Finland
19:00 UTC+3	Moisander 35'; Hämäläinen 82'	Report		Stadium: Veritas Stadium; Attendance: 5,859; Referee: Simon Lee Evans (Wales)

6 September 2013 2014 World Cup qualification	Finland	0–2	Spain	Helsinki, Finland
21:30 UTC+3		Report	Alba 19'; Negredo 86'	Stadium: Helsinki Olympic Stadium; Attendance: 37,492; Referee: Ivan Bebek (Croatia)

10 September 2013 2014 World Cup qualification	Georgia	0–1	Finland	Tbilisi, Georgia
21:00 UTC+4		Report	R. Eremenko 74' (pen.)	Stadium: Mikheil Meskhi Stadium; Attendance: 25,321; Referee: Leontios Trattou (Cyprus)

15 October 2013 2014 World Cup qualification	France	3–0	Finland	Saint-Denis, France
21:00 UTC+2	Ribéry 8'; Toivio 75' (o.g.); Benzema 87'	Report		Stadium: Stade de France; Attendance: 70,156; Referee: Michael Koukoulakis (Greece)

16 November 2013 Friendly	Wales	1–1	Finland	Cardiff, Wales
18:00 UTC+0	King 58'	Report	Riski 90+1'	Stadium: Cardiff City Stadium; Attendance: 11,809; Referee: Sébastien Delferière (Belgium)

=== 2014 ===
24 January 2014 Friendly	Oman	0–0	Finland	Nizwa, Oman
18:30 UTC+4		Report		Stadium: Nizwa Sports Complex; Attendance: 1.200; Referee: Abdulameer Abdulshaheed (Bahrain)

5 March 2014 Friendly	Hungary	1–2	Finland	Győr, Hungary
18:00 UTC+1	Rudolf 13'	Report	Pohjanpalo 74'; R. Eremenko 84' (pen.)	Stadium: ETO Park; Attendance: 14,000; Referee: Alexander Harkam (Austria)

21 May 2014 Friendly	Finland	2–2	Czech Republic	Helsinki, Finland
19:00 UTC+3	Pukki 18', 20'	Report	Vydra 19'; Hušbauer 36'	Stadium: Helsinki Olympic Stadium; Attendance: 6,547; Referee: Oliver Drachta (Austria)

29 May 2014 2014 Baltic Cup	Lithuania	1–0	Finland	Ventspils, Latvia
17:00 UTC+3	Novikovas 42'	Report		Stadium: Olimpiskais Stadions; Attendance: 631; Referee: Vadims Direktorenko (Latvia)

31 May 2014 2014 Baltic Cup	Finland	2–0	Estonia	Ventspils, Latvia
14:00 UTC+3	Hetemaj 49'; Moren 88'	Report		Stadium: Olimpiskais Stadions; Attendance: 830; Referee: Aleksandrs Anufrievs (Latvia)

7 September 2014 Euro 2016 qualifying	Faroe Islands	1–3	Finland	Tórshavn, Faroe Islands
19:45 UTC+1	Holst 41'	Report	Riski 53', 78'; R. Eremenko 82'	Stadium: Tórsvøllur; Attendance: 3,300; Referee: Simon Lee Evans (Wales)

11 October 2014 Euro 2016 qualifying	Finland	1–1	Greece	Helsinki, Finland
21:45 UTC+3	Hurme 55'	Report	Karelis 24'	Stadium: Helsinki Olympic Stadium; Attendance: 26,548; Referee: David Fernández Borbalán (Spain)

14 October 2014 Euro 2016 qualifying	Finland	0–2	Romania	Helsinki, Finland
21:45 UTC+3		Report	Stancu 54', 83'	Stadium: Helsinki Olympic Stadium; Attendance: 19,408; Referee: Paolo Tagliavento (Italy)

14 November 2014 Euro 2016 qualifying	Hungary	1–0	Finland	Budapest, Hungary
20:45 UTC+1	Gera 84'	Report		Stadium: Groupama Arena; Attendance: 19,600; Referee: Clément Turpin (France)

18 November 2014 Friendly	Slovakia	2–1	Finland	Žilina, Slovakia
17:00 UTC+1	Hološko 1'; Hamšík 8'	Report	Hubočan 45' (o.g.)	Stadium: Štadión pod Dubňom; Attendance: 3,998; Referee: Markus Hameter (Austria)

=== 2015 ===
19 January 2015 Friendly	Sweden	0–1	Finland	Abu Dhabi, United Arab Emirates
22:30 UTC+4		Report	Ro. Riski 63'	Stadium: Mohammed bin Zayed Stadium; Attendance: 100; Referee: Omar Al Ali (United Arab Emirates)

22 January 2015 Friendly	Yemen	0–0	Finland	Dubai, United Arab Emirates
18:00 UTC+4		Report		Stadium: The Sevens Stadium; Attendance: 250

29 March 2015 Euro 2016 qualifying	Northern Ireland	2–1	Finland	Belfast, Northern Ireland
17:00 UTC+1	K. Lafferty 33', 38'	Report	Sadik 90+1'	Stadium: Windsor Park; Attendance: 10,264; Referee: Szymon Marciniak (Poland)

9 June 2015 Friendly	Finland	0–2	Estonia	Turku, Finland
19:00 UTC+3		Report	Purje 28', 57'	Stadium: Veritas Stadium; Attendance: 6,107; Referee: Jakob Kehlet (Denmark)

13 June 2015 Euro 2016 qualifying	Finland	0–1	Hungary	Helsinki, Finland
19:00 UTC+3		Report	Stieber 82'	Stadium: Helsinki Olympic Stadium; Attendance: 20,434; Referee: Matej Jug (Slovenia)

4 September 2015 Euro 2016 qualifying	Greece	0–1	Finland	Piraeus, Greece
21:45 UTC+3		Report	Pohjanpalo 75'	Stadium: Karaiskakis Stadium; Attendance: 17,358; Referee: Serhiy Boyko (Ukraine)

7 September 2015 Euro 2016 qualifying	Finland	1–0	Faroe Islands	Helsinki, Finland
21:45 UTC+3	Pohjanpalo 23'	Report		Stadium: Helsinki Olympic Stadium; Attendance: 9,477; Referee: Marcin Borski (Poland)

8 October 2015 Euro 2016 qualifying	Romania	1–1	Finland	Bucharest, Romania
21:45 UTC+3	Hoban 90+1'	Report	Pohjanpalo 67'	Stadium: Arena Națională; Attendance: 47,987; Referee: Craig Thomson (Scotland)

11 October 2015 Euro 2016 qualifying	Finland	1–1	Northern Ireland	Helsinki, Finland
19:00 UTC+3	Arajuuri 87'	Report	Cathcart 31'	Stadium: Helsinki Olympic Stadium; Attendance: 14,550; Referee: Sergei Karasev (Russia)

=== 2016 ===
10 January 2016 Friendly	Sweden	3–0	Finland	Abu Dhabi, United Arab Emirates
18:45 UTC+4	Salomonsson 45+1' (pen.); Hallberg 46'; Kujović 59'	Report		Stadium: Armed Forces Stadium; Attendance: 50; Referee: Abdullah Al Ajel (United Arab Emirates)

13 January 2016 Friendly	Finland	0–1	Iceland	Abu Dhabi, United Arab Emirates
20:00 UTC+4		Report	Traustason 16'	Stadium: Mohammed bin Zayed Stadium; Attendance: 50; Referee: Adel Al Naqbi (United Arab Emirates)

26 March 2016 Friendly	Poland	5–0	Finland	Wrocław, Poland
17:30 UTC+1	Grosicki 18', 85'; Wszołek 20', 66'; Starzyński 32'	Report		Stadium: Wrocław Stadium; Attendance: 42,068; Referee: Hiroyuki Kimura (Japan)

29 March 2016 Friendly	Norway	2–0	Finland	Oslo, Norway
20:00 UTC+2	Berget 57'; Johansen 84'	Report		Stadium: Ullevaal Stadion; Attendance: 4,675; Referee: Neil Doyle (Ireland)

1 June 2016 Friendly	Belgium	1–1	Finland	Brussels, Belgium
20:45 UTC+2	R. Lukaku 89'	Report	Hämäläinen 53'	Stadium: King Baudouin Stadium; Attendance: 28,025; Referee: Hugo Miguel (Portugal)

6 June 2016 Friendly	Italy	2–0	Finland	Verona, Italy
20:45 UTC+2	Candreva 27' (pen.); De Rossi 71'	Report		Stadium: Stadio Marc'Antonio Bentegodi; Attendance: 27,702; Referee: Bas Nijhuis (Netherlands)

31 August 2016 Friendly	Germany	2–0	Finland	Mönchengladbach, Germany
20:45 UTC+2	Meyer 55'; Özil 77'	Report		Stadium: Borussia-Park; Attendance: 30,121; Referee: Aleksei Kulbakov (Belarus)

5 September 2016 2018 World Cup qualification	Finland	1–1	Kosovo	Turku, Finland
21:45 UTC+3	Arajuuri 18'	Report	Berisha 60' (pen.)	Stadium: Veritas Stadium; Attendance: 7,571; Referee: Ivan Kružliak (Slovakia)

6 October 2016 2018 World Cup qualification	Iceland	3–2	Finland	Reykjavík, Iceland
18:45 UTC±0	Árnason 37'; Finnbogason 90+1'; Sigurðsson 90+6'	Report	Pukki 21'; Lod 39'	Stadium: Laugardalsvöllur; Attendance: 9,548; Referee: Svein Oddvar Moen (Norway)

9 October 2016 2018 World Cup qualification	Finland	0–1	Croatia	Tampere, Finland
19:00 UTC+3		Report	Mandžukić 18'	Stadium: Tampere Stadium; Attendance: 15,567; Referee: Ruddy Buquet (France)

12 November 2016 2018 World Cup qualification	Ukraine	1–0	Finland	Odesa, Ukraine
21:45 UTC+2	Kravets 25'	Report		Stadium: Chornomorets Stadium; Attendance: 26,482; Referee: Jorge Sousa (Portugal)

=== 2017 ===
9 January 2017 Friendly	Morocco	0–1	Finland	Al Ain, United Arab Emirates
18:00 UTC+4		Report	Ojala 45+1'	Stadium: Tahnoun bin Mohammed Stadium; Attendance: 3,800; Referee: Sultan Al Marzooqi (United Arab Emirates)

13 January 2017 Friendly (Unofficial)	Slovenia B	2–0	Finland	Abu Dhabi, United Arab Emirates
19:00 UTC+4	Kronaveter 12'; Dobrovoljc 48'	Report		Stadium: Armed Forces Stadium; Referee: Hamad Ali Yousef (United Arab Emirates)

24 March 2017 2018 World Cup qualification	Turkey	2–0	Finland	Antalya, Turkey
20:00 UTC+3	Tosun 9', 13'	Report		Stadium: Antalya Stadium; Attendance: 28,990; Referee: Jesús Gil Manzano (Spain)

28 March 2017 Friendly	Austria	1–1	Finland	Innsbruck, Austria
20:45 UTC+2	Arnautović 62'	Report	Jensen 76'	Stadium: Tivoli Neu Stadium; Attendance: 13,700; Referee: Miroslav Zelinka (Czech Republic)

7 June 2017 Friendly	Finland	1–1	Liechtenstein	Turku, Finland
19:00 UTC+3	M. Hetemaj 18'	Report	Hasler 62'	Stadium: Veritas Stadium; Attendance: 5,460; Referee: Mohammed Al-Hakim (Sweden)

11 June 2017 2018 World Cup qualification	Finland	1–2	Ukraine	Tampere, Finland
19:00 UTC+3	Pohjanpalo 72'	Report	Konoplyanka 51'; Besyedin 75'	Stadium: Tampere Stadium; Attendance: 8,723; Referee: Alon Yefet (Israel)

2 September 2017 2018 World Cup qualification	Finland	1–0	Iceland	Tampere, Finland
19:00 UTC+3	Ring 8'	Report		Stadium: Tampere Stadium; Attendance: 15,835; Referee: Pavel Královec (Czech Republic)

5 September 2017 2018 World Cup qualification	Kosovo	0–1	Finland	Shkodër, Albania
20:45 (20:45 UTC+2)		Report	Pukki 83'	Stadium: Loro Boriçi Stadium; Attendance: 2,446; Referee: Manuel Schüttengruber (Austria)

6 October 2017 2018 World Cup qualification	Croatia	1–1	Finland	Rijeka, Croatia
20:45 UTC+2	Mandžukić 57'	Report	Soiri 90'	Stadium: Rujevica Stadium; Attendance: 7,578; Referee: Daniel Stefański (Poland)

9 October 2017 2018 World Cup qualification	Finland	2–2	Turkey	Turku, Finland
21:45 UTC+3	Arajuuri 76'; Pohjanpalo 88'	Report	Tosun 57', 83'	Stadium: Veritas Stadium; Attendance: 6,612; Referee: Benoît Bastien (France)

9 November 2017 Friendly	Finland	3–0	Estonia	Helsinki, Finland
19:00 UTC+2	Soiri 27'; Lod 31', 54'	Report		Stadium: Telia 5G -areena Attendance: 2,190; Referee: Ola Hobber Nilsen (Norway)

=== 2018 ===
11 January 2018 Friendly	Jordan	1–2	Finland	Abu Dhabi, United Arab Emirates
16:30 UTC+4	Mardi 82'	Report	Toivio 35'; Pelvas 60'	Stadium: Zayed Sports City Stadium; Referee: Fahad Al-Marri (Qatar)

23 March 2018 Friendly	Finland	0–0	Macedonia	Belek, Turkey
18:00 UTC+3		Report		Stadium: Gloria Sports Arena; Attendance: 1,000; Referee: Mete Kalkavan (Turkey)

26 March 2018 Friendly	Finland	5–0	Malta	Belek, Turkey
19:00 UTC+2	Pukki 13', 27'; Taimi 23'; Jensen 84'; Soiri 88'	Report		Stadium: Gloria Sports Arena; Attendance: 200; Referee: Hüseyin Göçek (Turkey)

5 June 2018 Friendly	Romania	2–0	Finland	Ploiești, Romania
20:30 UTC+3	Manea 37'; Deac 61'	Report		Stadium: Stadionul Ilie Oană; Attendance: 13,312; Referee: Rob Harvey (Ireland)

9 June 2018 Friendly	Finland	2–0	Belarus	Tampere, Finland
19:00 UTC+3	Uronen 7'; Yaghoubi 75'	Report		Stadium: Tampere Stadium; Attendance: 4,520; Referee: Alain Durieux (Luxembourg)

8 September 2018 2018–19 Nations League	Finland	1–0	Hungary	Tampere, Finland
19:00 UTC+3	Pukki 7'	Report		Stadium: Tampere Stadium; Attendance: 10,220; Referee: Gediminas Mažeika (Lithuania)

11 September 2018 2018–19 Nations League	Finland	1–0	Estonia	Turku, Finland
21:45 UTC+3	Pukki 12'	Report		Stadium: Veritas Stadium; Attendance: 4,632; Referee: Orel Grinfeld (Israel)

12 October 2018 2018–19 Nations League	Estonia	0–1	Finland	Tallinn, Estonia
21:45 UTC+3		Report	Pukki 90+1'	Stadium: A. Le Coq Arena; Attendance: 8,087; Referee: Craig Pawson (England)

15 October 2018 2018–19 Nations League	Finland	2–0	Greece	Tampere, Finland
21:45 UTC+3	Soiri 46'; Kamara 89'	Report		Stadium: Tampere Stadium; Attendance: 10,107; Referee: Paweł Gil (Poland)

15 November 2018 2018–19 Nations League	Greece	1–0	Finland	Athens, Greece
21:45 UTC+2	Granlund 25' (o.g.)	Report		Stadium: Olympic Stadium; Attendance: 6,376; Referee: Luca Banti (Italy)

18 November 2018 2018–19 Nations League	Hungary	2–0	Finland	Budapest, Hungary
20:45 UTC+1	Szalai 29'; Á. Nagy 37'	Report		Stadium: Groupama Arena; Attendance: 9,200; Referee: Slavko Vinčić (Slovenia)

=== 2019 ===
8 January 2019 Friendly	Sweden	0–1	Finland	Doha, Qatar
19:45 UTC+3		Report	Markkanen 22'	Stadium: Jassim Bin Hamad Stadium; Attendance: 326; Referee: Abdulla Al-Marri (Qatar)

11 January 2019 Friendly	Estonia	2–1	Finland	Doha, Qatar
15:00 UTC+3	Kams 35'; Anier 62'	Report	Karjalainen 81'	Stadium: Khalifa International Stadium; Attendance: 200; Referee: Khalid Al-Shaqsi (Oman)

23 March 2019 Euro 2020 qualifying	Italy	2–0	Finland	Udine, Italy
20:45 UTC+1	Barella 7'; Kean 74'	Report		Stadium: Stadio Friuli; Attendance: 24,000; Referee: Orel Grinfeld (Israel)

26 March 2019 Euro 2020 qualifying	Armenia	0–2	Finland	Yerevan, Armenia
21:00 UTC+4		Report	Jensen 14'; Soiri 78'	Stadium: Vazgen Sargsyan Republican Stadium; Attendance: 12,900; Referee: Nikola Dabanović (Montenegro)

8 June 2019 Euro 2020 qualifying	Finland	2–0	Bosnia and Herzegovina	Tampere, Finland
19:00 UTC+3	Pukki 56', 68'	Report		Stadium: Tampere Stadium; Attendance: 16,103; Referee: Daniel Stefanski (Poland)

11 June 2019 Euro 2020 qualifying	Liechtenstein	0–2	Finland	Vaduz, Liechtenstein
20:45 UTC+2		Report	Pukki 37'; Källman 57'	Stadium: Rheinpark Stadium; Attendance: 2,160; Referee: Jens Maae (Denmark)

5 September 2019 Euro 2020 qualifying	Finland	1–0	Greece	Tampere, Finland
20:45 UTC+3	Pukki 52' (pen.)	Report		Stadium: Tampere Stadium; Attendance: 16,163; Referee: Juan Martínez Munuera (Spain)

8 September 2019 Euro 2020 qualifying	Finland	1–2	Italy	Tampere, Finland
20:45 UTC+3	Pukki 72' (pen.)	Report	Immobile 59'; Jorginho 79' (pen.)	Stadium: Tampere Stadium; Attendance: 16,292; Referee: Bobby Madden (Scotland)

12 October 2019 Euro 2020 qualifying	Bosnia and Herzegovina	4–1	Finland	Zenica, Bosnia and Herzegovina
18:00 UTC+2	Hajrović 29'; Pjanić 37' (pen.), 58'; Hodžić 73'	Report	Pohjanpalo 79'	Stadium: Bilino Polje Stadium; Attendance: 8,193; Referee: Ivan Kružliak (Slovakia)

15 October 2019 Euro 2020 qualifying	Finland	3–0	Armenia	Turku, Finland
18:00 UTC+3	Jensen 31'; Pukki 61', 88'	Report		Stadium: Veritas Stadium; Attendance: 7,231; Referee: Jesús Gil Manzano (Spain)

15 November 2019 Euro 2020 qualifying	Finland	3–0	Liechtenstein	Helsinki, Finland
18:00 UTC+2	Tuominen 21'; Pukki 64' (pen.), 75'	Report		Stadium: Telia 5G -areena Attendance: 9,804; Referee: Benoît Bastien (France)

19 November 2019 Euro 2020 qualifying	Greece	2–1	Finland	Athens, Greece
20:45 UTC+1	Mantalos 47'; Galanopoulos 70'	Report	Pukki 27'	Stadium: Athens Olympic Stadium; Attendance: 5,453; Referee: Aleksei Eskov (Russia)

== See also ==
- Finland national football team results (1911–1930)
- Finland national football team results (1930–1969)
- Finland national football team results (1970–1979)
- Finland national football team results (1980–1989)
- Finland national football team results (1990–1999)
- Finland national football team results (2000–2019)
- Finland national football team results (2020–present)
- Finland national football team head to head
- Finland women's national football team results
