= 2006 LG Cup (Saudi Arabia) =

2006 LG Cup Four Nations Tournament
Tournament details
- Host country: Saudi Arabia
- City: Riyadh
- Dates: 21-25 January 2006
- Teams: 4
- Venue: (in 1 host city)

Final positions
- Champions: South Korea (1st title)
- Runners-up: Greece
- Third place: Saudi Arabia
- Fourth place: Finland

Tournament statistics
- Matches played: 4
- Goals scored: 7 (1.75 per match)
- Top scorer: (South Korea) Park Chu-young (2 goals)

The 2006 Saudi Arabia LG Cup was an exhibition association football tournament that took place in Saudi Arabia. South Korea won the tournament with four points.

== Participants ==
The participants were:

- Saudi Arabia
- Greece
- South Korea
- Finland

== Results ==
21 January 2006

Greece	1–1	South Korea
Zagorakis 10'	Report	Park Chu-young 24'

King Fahd International Stadium, Riyadh
Referee: Al-Shehri (Saudi Arabia)

21 January 2006

Saudi Arabia	1–1	Finland
Al-Shlhoub 58'	Report	Roiha 24'

Prince Faisal bin Fahd Stadium, Riyadh

25 January 2006

South Korea	1–0	Finland
Park Chu-young 46'	Report

King Fahd International Stadium, Riyadh

25 January 2006

Saudi Arabia	1–1	Greece
Al-Thaker 89'	Report; Report	Zagorakis 58' (pen.)

Prince Faisal bin Fahd Stadium, Riyadh
Attendance: 2,900
Referee: Jassim Mohammed (Bahrain).

== Final standings ==
Pos	Team	Pld	W	D	L	GF	GA	GR	Pts	Qualification
1	South Korea (C)	2	1	1	0	2	1	2.000	3	Winners
2	Greece	2	0	2	0	2	2	1.000	2	
3	Saudi Arabia (H)	2	0	2	0	2	2	1.000	2	
4	Finland	2	0	1	1	1	2	0.500	1	

(C) Champions; (H) Hosts

== Matches ==
2006 LG Cup (Saudi Arabia) winner

South Korea
First title

== Statistics ==
=== Goalscorers ===
There were 7 goals scored in 4 matches, for an average of 1.75 goals per match.

2 goals

- (Greece) Theodoros Zagorakis
- (South Korea) Park Chu-young

1 goal

- (Saudi Arabia) Khaled Al-Thaker
- (Saudi Arabia) Mohammed Al-Shlhoub
- (Finland) Paulus Roiha

== See also ==
- LG Cup
