= TP-47 =

Finnish football club

- Full name: Tornion Pallo −47
- Founded: 1947
- Ground: Pohjan Stadion, Tornio
- Capacity: 4,000
- Chairman: Heikki Kerkelä
- Coach: Keijo Huusko
- League: Kakkonen
- 2026: Kakkonen Group C, 7th of 10
Home colours	Away colours

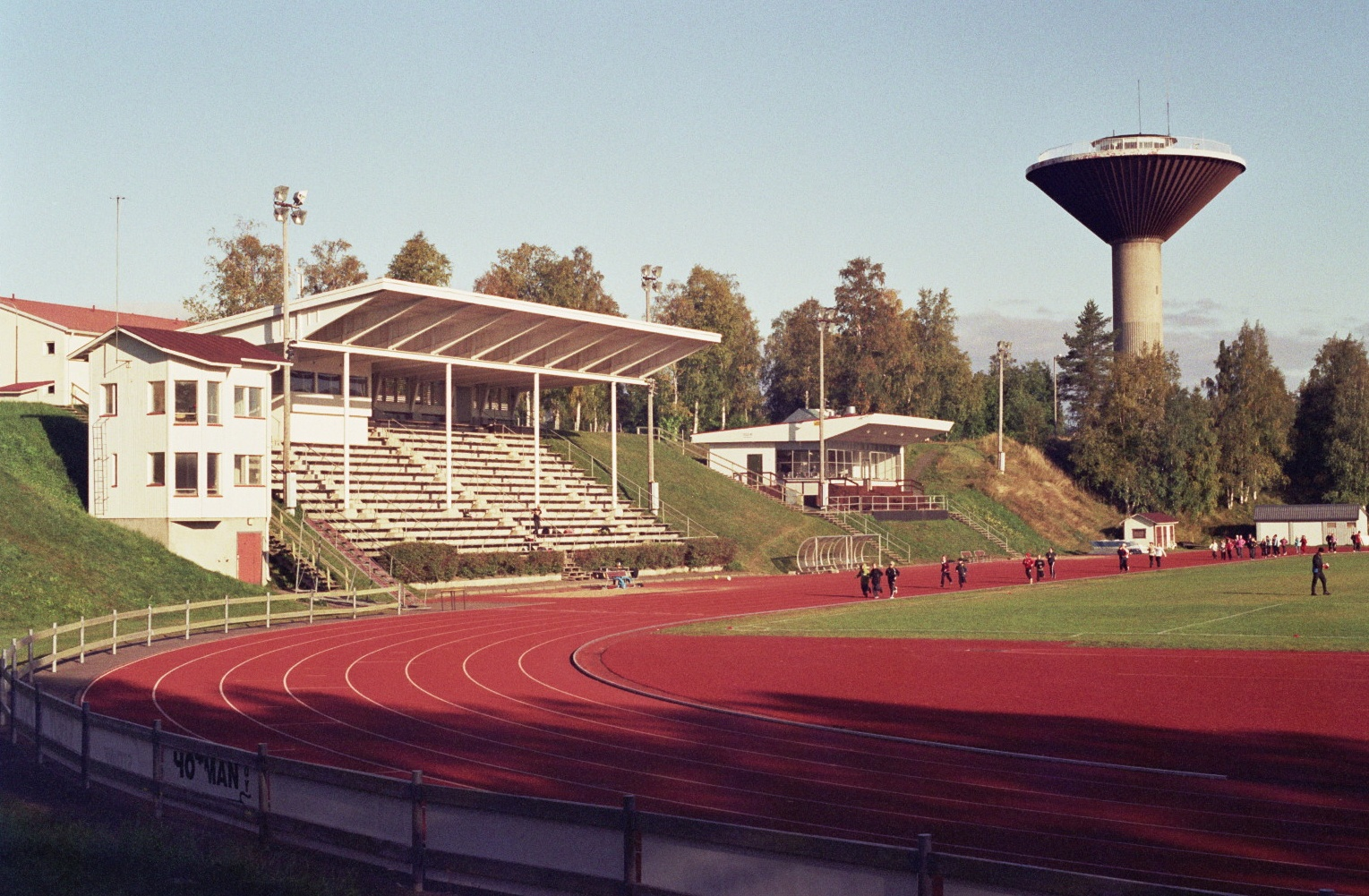
Pohja Stadium

Tornion Pallo −47 (or TP-47) is a Finnish football club, based in the town of Tornio. It currently plays in the Finnish fourth tier Kakkonen. It plays its home matches at Pohjan Stadion. The most famous player who has been raised by the club is Teemu Tainio.

== Season to season ==
Season to season of TP-47

Season	Level	Division	Section	Administration	Position	Movements
1955	Tier 4	Piirinsarja (District League)		Lappi District(SPL Lappi)		Promotion Playoff - Promoted
1956	Tier 3	Maakuntasarja (Third Division)	North Group I	Finnish FA (Suomen Palloliitto)	3rd	
1957	Tier 3	Maakuntasarja (Third Division)	North Group II	Finnish FA (Suomen Palloliitto)	1st	Promoted
1958	Tier 2	Suomensarja (Second Division)	North Group	Finnish FA (Suomen Pallolitto)	6th	
1959	Tier 2	Suomensarja (Second Division)	North Group	Finnish FA (Suomen Pallolitto)	10th	Relegated
1960	Tier 3	Maakuntasarja (Third Division)	Group 9	Finnish FA (Suomen Palloliitto)	1st	Promoted
1961	Tier 2	Suomensarja (Second Division)	North Group	Finnish FA (Suomen Pallolitto)	12th	Relegated
1962	Tier 3	Maakuntasarja (Third Division)	Group 9	Finnish FA (Suomen Palloliitto)	2nd	
1963	Tier 3	Maakuntasarja (Third Division)	Group 9	Finnish FA (Suomen Palloliitto)	2nd	
1964	Tier 3	Maakuntasarja (Third Division)	Group 9	Finnish FA (Suomen Palloliitto)	1st	Promoted
1965	Tier 2	Suomensarja (Second Division)	North Group	Finnish FA (Suomen Pallolitto)	5th	
1966	Tier 2	Suomensarja (Second Division)	North Group	Finnish FA (Suomen Pallolitto)	6th	
1967	Tier 2	Suomensarja (Second Division)	North Group	Finnish FA (Suomen Pallolitto)	9th	
1968	Tier 2	Suomensarja (Second Division)	North Group	Finnish FA (Suomen Pallolitto)	10th	Relegated
1969	Tier 3	Maakuntasarja (Third Division)	Group 8	Finnish FA (Suomen Palloliitto)	3rd	
1970	Tier 3	III Divisioona (Third Division)	Group 8	Finnish FA (Suomen Palloliitto)	3rd	
1971	Tier 3	III Divisioona (Third Division)	Group 7	Finnish FA (Suomen Palloliitto)	3rd	
1972	Tier 3	III Divisioona (Third Division)	Group 9	Finnish FA (Suomen Palloliitto)	2nd	Promoted
1973	Tier 3	II Divisioona (Second Division)	North Group	Finnish FA (Suomen Palloliitto)	4th	
1974	Tier 3	II Divisioona (Second Division)	North Group	Finnish FA (Suomen Palloliitto)	10th	Relegated
1975	Tier 4	III Divisioona (Third Division)	Group 9	Northern Finland (SPL Pohjois-Suomi)	1st	Promoted
1976	Tier 3	II Divisioona (Second Division)	North Group	Finnish FA (Suomen Palloliitto)	7th	
1977	Tier 3	II Divisioona (Second Division)	North Group	Finnish FA (Suomen Palloliitto)	11th	Relegated
1978	Tier 4	III Divisioona (Third Division)	Group 9	Northern Finland (SPL Pohjois-Suomi)	5th	
1979	Tier 4	III Divisioona (Third Division)	Group 9	Northern Finland (SPL Pohjois-Suomi)	7th	
1980	Tier 4	III Divisioona (Third Division)	Group 9	Northern Finland (SPL Pohjois-Suomi)	5th	
1981	Tier 4	III Divisioona (Third Division)	Group 9	Northern Finland (SPL Pohjois-Suomi)	7th	
1982	Tier 4	III Divisioona (Third Division)	Group 9	Northern Finland (SPL Pohjois-Suomi)	7th	
1983	Tier 4	III Divisioona (Third Division)	Group 9	Northern Finland (SPL Pohjois-Suomi)	3rd	
1984-86	Only youth teams					
1987	Tier 6	V Divisioona (Fifth Division)		Lappi District (SPL Lappi)		Promoted
1988	Tier 5	IV Divisioona (Fourth Division)	Group 18 - Lapland	Lappi District (SPL Lappi)	1st	Promoted
1989	Tier 4	III Divisioona (Third Division)	Group 9	Northern Finland (SPL Pohjois-Suomi)	2nd	
1990	Tier 4	III Divisioona (Third Division)	Group 9	Northern Finland (SPL Pohjois-Suomi)	4th	
1991	Tier 4	III Divisioona (Third Division)	Group 9	Northern Finland (SPL Pohjois-Suomi)	6th	
1992	Tier 4	III Divisioona (Third Division)	Group 9	Northern Finland (SPL Pohjois-Suomi)	2nd	
1993	Tier 4	Kolmonen (Third Division)	Group 9	Northern Finland (SPL Pohjois-Suomi)	2nd	Promoted
1994	Tier 3	Kakkonen (Second Division)	North Group	Finnish FA (Suomen Palloliitto)	11th	Relegated
1995	Tier 4	Kolmonen (Third Division)	Group 8	Northern Finland (SPL Pohjois-Suomi)	9th	
1996	Tier 4	Kolmonen (Third Division)	Group 8	Northern Finland (SPL Pohjois-Suomi)	2nd	Promotion Playoff
1997	Tier 4	Kolmonen (Third Division)	Group 8 Lapland	Northern Finland (SPL Pohjois-Suomi)	1st	Promotion Playoff
1998	Tier 4	Kolmonen (Third Division)	Group 8 Lapland	Northern Finland (SPL Pohjois-Suomi)	1st	Promotion Playoff - Promoted
1999	Tier 3	Kakkonen (Second Division)	North Group	Finnish FA (Suomen Palloliitto)	6th	
2000	Tier 3	Kakkonen (Second Division)	North Group	Finnish FA (Suomen Palloliitto)	1st	Promoted
2001	Tier 2	Ykkönen (First Division)	North Group	Finnish FA (Suomen Pallolitto)	7th	
2002	Tier 2	Ykkönen (First Division)	North Group	Finnish FA (Suomen Pallolitto)	2nd	Promotion Playoff 8th
2003	Tier 2	Ykkönen (First Division)		Finnish FA (Suomen Pallolitto)	1st	Promoted
2004	Tier 1	Veikkausliiga (Premier League)		Finnish FA (Suomen Palloliitto)	10th	
2005	Tier 1	Veikkausliiga (Premier League)		Finnish FA (Suomen Palloliitto)	14th	Relegated
2006	Tier 2	Ykkönen (First Division)		Finnish FA (Suomen Pallolitto)	4th	
2007	Tier 2	Ykkönen (First Division)		Finnish FA (Suomen Pallolitto)	5th	
2008	Tier 2	Ykkönen (First Division)		Finnish FA (Suomen Pallolitto)	10th	
2009	Tier 2	Ykkönen (First Division)		Finnish FA (Suomen Pallolitto)	12th	Relegated
2010	Tier 3	Kakkonen (Second Division)	Group C	Finnish FA (Suomen Palloliitto)	2nd	
2011	Tier 3	Kakkonen (Second Division)	Group C	Finnish FA (Suomen Palloliitto)	3rd	
2012	Tier 3	Kakkonen (Second Division)	North Group	Finnish FA (Suomen Palloliitto)	5th	
2013	Tier 3	Kakkonen (Second Division)	North Group	Finnish FA (Suomen Palloliitto)	4th	
2014	Tier 3	Kakkonen (Second Division)	North Group	Finnish FA (Suomen Palloliitto)	7th	
2015	Tier 3	Kakkonen (Second Division)	North Group	Finnish FA (Suomen Palloliitto)	6th	
2016	Tier 3	Kakkonen (Second Division)	Group C	Finnish FA (Suomen Palloliitto)	5th	
2017	Tier 3	Kakkonen (Second Division)	Group C	Finnish FA (Suomen Palloliitto)	6th	
2018	Tier 3	Kakkonen (Second Division)	Group C	Finnish FA (Suomen Palloliitto)	12th	Relegated
2019	Tier 4	Kolmonen (Third Division)		Northern District (SPL Pohjois-Suomi)	5th	
2020	Tier 4	Kolmonen (Third Division)		Northern District (SPL Pohjois-Suomi)	2nd	
2021	Tier 4	Kolmonen (Third Division)		Northern District (SPL Pohjois-Suomi)	4th	
2022	Tier 4	Kolmonen (Third Division)		Northern District (SPL Pohjois-Suomi)	1st	Promotion Playoffs - Promoted
2023	Tier 3	Kakkonen (Second Division)	Group C	Finnish FA (Suomen Palloliitto)	8th	
2024	Tier 4	Kakkonen (Second Division)	Group C	Finnish FA (Suomen Palloliitto)	5th	
2025	Tier 4	Kakkonen (Second Division)	Group C	Finnish FA (Suomen Palloliitto)	4th	
2026	Tier 4	Kakkonen (Second Division)	Group C	Finnish FA (Suomen Palloliitto)		

- 2 seasons in Veikkausliiga
- 14 seasons in 2nd Tier
- 27 seasons in 3rd Tier
- 23 seasons in 4th Tier
- 1 season in 5th Tier
- 1 season in 6th Tier

== Notable players ==
- Keijo Huusko, National player for Finland
