= Keijo Huusko =

Finnish footballer (born 1980)

Personal information
- Date of birth: 5 August 1980 (age 46)
- Place of birth: Kemi, Finland
- Height: 1.80 m (5 ft 11 in)
- Positions: Defensive midfielder; striker

Senior career*
Years	Team	Apps	(Gls)
1997–1999	KPT-85	56	(8)
2000	PS Kemi Kings	6	(0)
2000–2001	VPS	41	(9)
2002–2003	BK Häcken	49	(19)
2004	TP-47	25	(9)
2005	FK Lyn	16	(4)
2006–2007	Strømsgodset	45	(7)
2008–2009	Tromsø IL	2	(0)
2010	TP-47	10	(1)
2010–2011	PS Kemi Kings	20	(2)
2011	FC-88 Kemi	1	(0)
2011–	RoPS	0	(0)

International career
2004–2006	Finland	8	(2)
- * Club domestic league appearances and goals as of 24 August 2011

Keijo Huusko (born 5 August 1980 in Kemi) is a retired Finnish footballer who most recently played for TP-47 in 2015.

== Career ==
He previously played for Vaasan Palloseura, BK Häcken, Lyn, Strømsgodset, and Tromsø IL. He joined Tromsø on 1 January 2008. After several injuries, Huusko decided to move back to Finland and TP-47. He signed a four-year contract with them on 26 February 2010. The striker left TP-47 in February 2010 and signed for PS Kemi Kings.

== International career ==
Huusko has been capped eight times and scored two goals for the Finland national football team.

== Coaching career ==
He also has the roles of assistant manager and director of football. Huusko was also, during his TP career, the assistant manager and director of football of the Finnish club. As of 2021, he was coaching boys' soccer at the Tervarit Juniors Association.

== Career statistics ==
=== International ===
Appearances and goals by national team and year
National team	Year	Apps	Goals
Finland	2004	2	1
Finland	2005	4	1
Finland	2006	2	0
Total		8	2

Scores and results list Finland's goal tally first, score column indicates score after each Huusko goal.

List of international goals scored by Keijo Huusko
No.	Date	Venue	Opponent	Score	Result	Competition
1	1 December 2004	Bahrain National Stadium, Riffa, Bahrain	Bahrain	2–1	2–1	2004 Prime Minister's Cup
2	8 February 2005	GSP Stadium, Nicosia, Cyprus	Latvia	2–1	2–1	Friendly
