= Paulus Roiha =

Finnish footballer (born 1980)

Personal information
- Date of birth: 3 August 1980 (age 46)
- Place of birth: Espoo, Finland
- Height: 1.81 m (5 ft 11 in)
- Position: Forward

Youth career
- Honka
- –2000: HJK

Senior career*
Years	Team	Apps	(Gls)
1997–1999	Honka	32	(7)
1999–2001	HJK	65	(33)
2002–2003	Utrecht	39	(6)
2003–2004	Zwolle	11	(0)
2004–2006	Cercle Brugge	41	(10)
2006–2007	ADO Den Haag	10	(0)
2007	Újpest	6	(1)
2008–2009	HJK	23	(8)
2010	Åtvidaberg	28	(7)
2011	KuPS	4	(1)
Total		259	(73)

International career
2001–2010	Finland	20	(4)
- * Club domestic league appearances and goals

Paulus Roiha (born 3 August 1980) is a Finnish former professional footballer who played as a forward.

== Club career ==
Roiha began his Veikkausliiga career in Finland with HJK Helsinki. He was the top scorer in Finland in 2001 with 22 goals. In September 2001 he scored twice for the club against Celtic in a UEFA Cup tie, which HJK eventually lost 3–2 on aggregate.

He transferred to Utrecht from HJK in 2001 for a €500,000 transfer fee. Roiha has since also played for Zwolle in the Netherlands and for Cercle Brugge in Belgium. He joined ADO Den Haag on a free transfer from Cercle Brugge during the January 2006 transfer window playing his first Eredivisie match with them on 28 January 2007.

After a short stint with Hungarian club Újpest, the club released him because of an injury in January 2010, and a few days later he signed a two-year contract with HJK Helsinki. However, injuries kept him sidelined for most of the 2009 season and he was released by HJK at the end of the season. In 2010, Roiha joined newly promoted Allsvenskan club Åtvidabergs FF on a free transfer. The club, however, suffered relegation to Superettan and he left after the season. In the 2011 season, Roiha played for Finnish club KuPS. After the season, he decided to retire from football.

== International career ==
Roiha played his first match for the Finnish national team on 1 February 2001 against Sweden; however, he was not able to become a regular for Finland in qualifying matches due to injuries.

== Career statistics ==
=== Club ===
As of 31 December 2011

Appearances and goals by club, season and competition
Club	Season	League			National cup (Note: Includes Suomen Cup)		Other		Continental		Total	
Club	Season	Division	Apps	Goals	Apps	Goals	Apps	Goals	Apps	Goals	Apps	Goals
Honka	1997	Ykkönen					—		—			
Honka	1998	Ykkönen					—		—			
Honka	1999	Ykkönen					—		—			
Honka	Total		32	7			—		—		32	7
HJK	1999	Veikkausliiga	1	0	0	0	0	0	0	0	1	0
HJK	2000	Veikkausliiga	33	11	1	0	0	0	3 (Note: Includes UEFA Cup)	3	35	14
HJK	2001	Veikkausliiga	31	22	0	0	0	0	4	1	35	23
HJK	Total		65	33	1	0	0	0	7	4	73	37
Utrecht	2001–02	Eredivisie	12	3	2	0	—		—		14	3
Utrecht	2002–03	Eredivisie	24	3	0	0	—		1	0	25	3
Utrecht	2003–04	Eredivisie	3	0	0	0	—		1	0	4	0
Utrecht	Total		39	6	2	0	0	0	2	0	43	6
PEC Zwolle	2003–04	Eredivisie	11	0	—		—		—		11	0
Cercle Brugge	2004–05	Belgian First Division	30	9	1	0	—		—		31	9
Cercle Brugge	2005–06	Belgian First Division	11	1	1	0	—		—		12	1
Cercle Brugge	Total		41	10	2	0	0	0	0	0	43	10
ADO Den Haag	2005–06	Eredivisie	9	0	—		—		—		9	0
ADO Den Haag	2006–07	Eredivisie	1	0	—		—		—		1	0
ADO Den Haag	Total		10	0	0	0	0	0	0	0	10	0
Újpest	2007–08	NB I	6	1	—		—		—		6	1
HJK	2008	Veikkausliiga	18	9	2	2	0	0	0	0	20	11
HJK	2009	Veikkausliiga	5	0	0	0	1 (Note: Includes Finnish League Cup)	0	0	0	6	0
HJK	Total		23	9	2	2	1	0	0	0	26	11
Klubi 04	2009	Ykkönen	3	3	—		—		—		3	3
Åtvidaberg	2010	Allsvenskan	28	7	—		—		—		28	7
KuPS	2011	Veikkausliiga	4	1	—		—		—		4	1
Career total			262	77	7	2	1	0	9	4	279	83

=== International ===
Finland
Year	Apps	Goals
2001	2	0
2002	3	0
2003	4	0
2004	1	0
2005	3	3
2006	3	1
2007	0	0
2008	2	0
2009	0	0
2010	2	0
Total	20	4

=== International goals ===
Finland's score first.

#	Date	Location	Opponent	Score	Result	Competition
1.	2 February 2005	Nicosia, Cyprus	Cyprus	2–1	Win	Friendly
2.	2 February 2005	Nicosia, Cyprus	Cyprus	2–1	Win	Friendly
3.	17 October 2005	Skopje, Macedonia	Macedonia	3–0	Win	2006 World Cup qualification
4.	21 January 2006	Riyadh, Saudi Arabia	Saudi Arabia	1–1	Draw	Friendly
