= Sweden at the UEFA European Championship =

International football delegation

The UEFA European Championship is one of the major competitive international football tournaments, first played in 1960, whose finals stage has been held every four years, with the sixteenth staging of the competition occurring in 2021 (postponed for a year due to the COVID-19 pandemic in Europe).

The Sweden men's national football team first entered the UEFA European Championships during 1992 as host nation. In their first match they draw with France and then defeated Denmark and England. Sweden faced Germany in the semi-finals, losing 2-3. Sweden failed to qualify for Euro 1996, falling behind Switzerland and Turkey in points. Sweden qualified for Euro 2000 ahead of England during qualification. In the group stage, they lost to co-hosts Belgium, then drew with Turkey and lost to Italy. They qualified for Euro 2004, finishing ahead of Latvia. Sweden defeated Bulgaria 5-0 in their opening group stage match, followed by draws with Italy and Denmark. In the quarter final against the Netherlands, after 0-0, Sweden lost in penalties. During the qualifying phase for Euro 2008, Sweden finished behind Spain to qualify. They finished third in the group stage with a win over Greece, followed by losses to Spain and Russia. Sweden qualified for Euro 2012, having finished second behind the Netherlands. During the group stage they lost their first two matches, to co-hosts Ukraine and then England; despite a win over France, Sweden did not progress past the group stage. For Euro 2016, Sweden defeated Denmark during a playoff to qualify. During the group stage they drew with Ireland then lost to Italy and Belgium, and did not advance. For Euro 2020, after qualifying behind Spain, they again faced Spain in the group stage resulting in a draw; this was followed by wins over Slovakia and Poland. In the Round of 16, they lost to Ukraine in extra time 2-1. Sweden did not qualify for Euro 2024 following defeats by both Belgium and Austria.

== Overall record ==
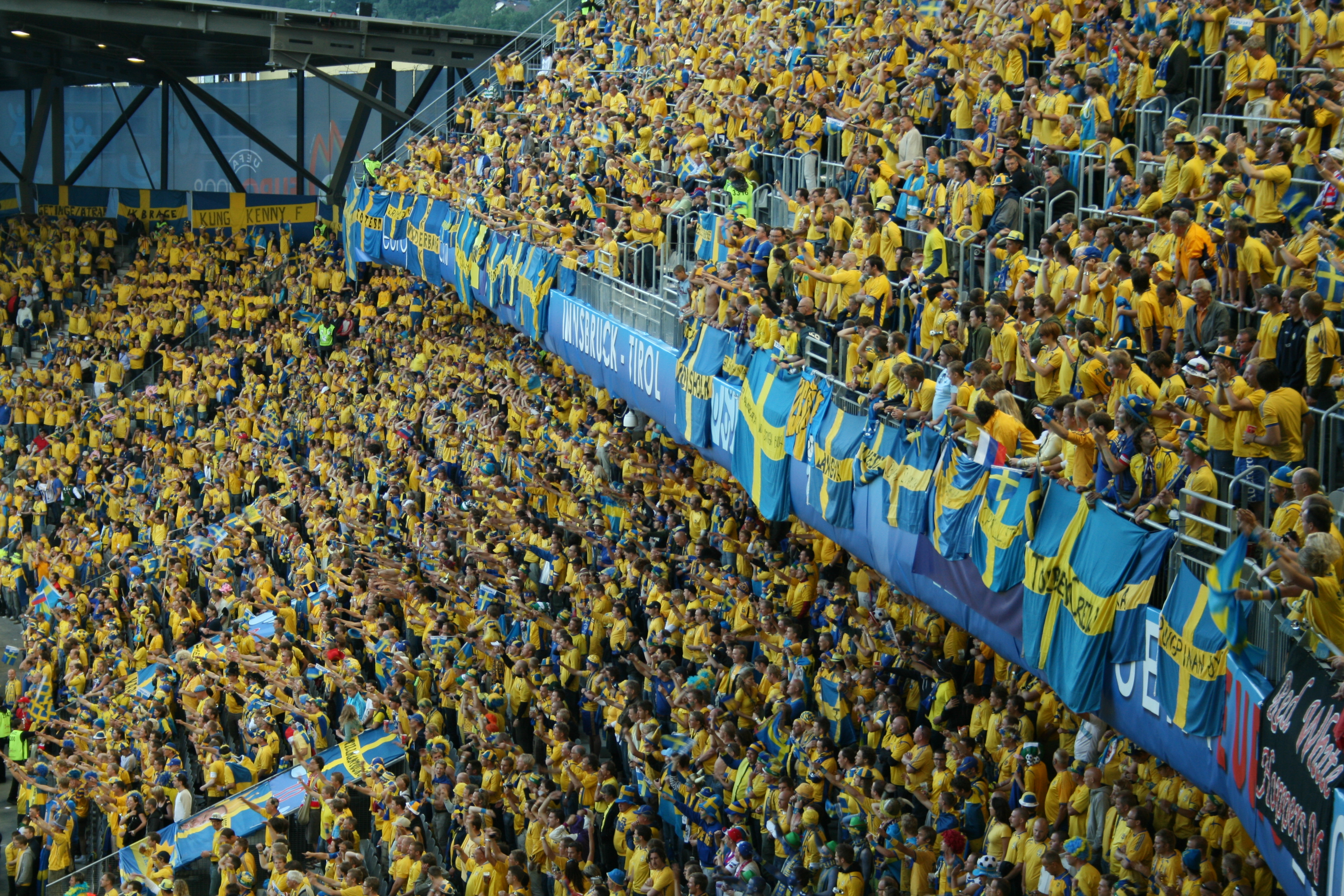
Swedish supporters during UEFA Euro 2008.

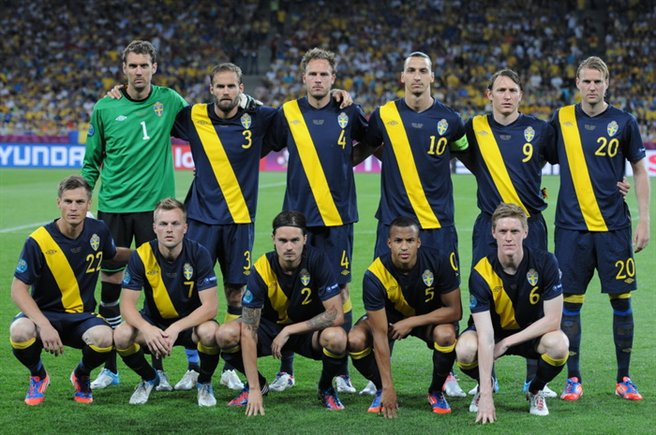
Sweden at the UEFA Euro 2012.

UEFA European Championship record									Qualification record					
Year	Round	Position	Pld	W	D*	L	GF	GA	Pld	W	D	L	GF	GA
(France) 1960	Did not enter								Did not enter					
(Spain) 1964	Did not qualify								6	2	3	1	8	7
(Italy) 1968	Did not qualify								6	2	1	3	9	12
(Belgium) 1972	Did not qualify								6	2	2	2	3	5
(Socialist Federal Republic of Yugoslavia) 1976	Did not qualify								6	3	0	3	8	9
(Italy) 1980	Did not qualify								6	1	2	3	9	13
(France) 1984	Did not qualify								8	5	1	2	14	5
(West Germany) 1988	Did not qualify								8	4	2	2	12	5
(Sweden) 1992	Semi-finals	3rd	4	2	1	1	6	5	Qualified as hosts					
(England) 1996	Did not qualify								8	2	3	3	9	10
(Belgium) (Netherlands) 2000	Group stage	14th	3	0	1	2	2	4	8	7	1	0	10	1
(Portugal) 2004	Quarter-finals	7th	4	1	3*	0	8	3	8	5	2	1	19	3
(Austria) (Switzerland) 2008	Group stage	10th	3	1	0	2	3	4	12	8	2	2	23	9
(Poland) (Ukraine) 2012	Group stage	11th	3	1	0	2	5	5	10	8	0	2	31	11
(France) 2016	Group stage	20th	3	0	1	2	1	3	12	6	4	2	19	12
(Europe) 2020	Round of 16	10th	4	2	1	1	5	4	10	6	3	1	23	9
(Germany) 2024	Did not qualify								8	3	1	4	14	12
(United Kingdom) (Republic of Ireland) 2028	To be determined								To be determined					
(Italy) (Turkey) 2032	To be determined								To be determined					
Total	Best: Semi-finals	7/17	24	7	7	10	30	28	122	64	27	31	211	123

*Draws include knockout matches decided via penalty shoot-out.
**Gold background colour indicates that the tournament was won.
***Red border colour indicates that the tournament was held on home soil.

== Euro 1992 ==
=== Group stage ===
Pos	Team	Pld	W	D	L	GF	GA	GD	Pts	Qualification
1	Sweden (H)	3	2	1	0	4	2	+2	5	Advance to knockout stage
2	Denmark	3	1	1	1	2	2	0	3	Advance to knockout stage
3	France	3	0	2	1	2	3	−1	2	
4	England	3	0	2	1	1	2	−1	2	

Source: UEFA
Rules for classification: Group stage tiebreakers
(H) Hosts
10 June 1992
20:15

Sweden	1–1	France
J. Eriksson 24'	Report	Papin 58'

Råsunda Stadium, Solna
Attendance: 29,860
Referee: Alexey Spirin (CIS)

14 June 1992
20:15

Sweden	1–0	Denmark
Brolin 58'	Report

Råsunda Stadium, Solna
Attendance: 29,902
Referee: Aron Schmidhuber (Germany)

17 June 1992
20:15

Sweden	2–1	England
J. Eriksson 51'; Brolin 82'	Report	Platt 4'

Råsunda Stadium, Solna
Attendance: 30,126
Referee: José Rosa dos Santos (Portugal)

=== Knockout stage ===
Semi-finals

21 June 1992
20:15

Sweden	2–3	Germany
Brolin 64' (pen.); K. Andersson 89'	Report	Häßler 11'; Riedle 59', 88'

Råsunda Stadium, Solna
Attendance: 28,827
Referee: Tullio Lanese (Italy)

== Euro 2000 ==
=== Group stage ===
Pos	Team	Pld	W	D	L	GF	GA	GD	Pts	Qualification
1	Italy	3	3	0	0	6	2	+4	9	Advance to knockout stage
2	Turkey	3	1	1	1	3	2	+1	4	Advance to knockout stage
3	Belgium (H)	3	1	0	2	2	5	−3	3	
4	Sweden	3	0	1	2	2	4	−2	1	

Source: UEFA
Rules for classification: Group stage tiebreakers
(H) Hosts
10 June 2000
20:45

Belgium	2–1	Sweden
Goor 43'; É. Mpenza 46'	Report	Mjällby 53'

King Baudouin Stadium, Brussels
Attendance: 46,700
Referee: Markus Merk (Germany)

15 June 2000
20:45

Sweden	0–0	Turkey
	Report

Philips Stadion, Eindhoven
Attendance: 27,000
Referee: Dick Jol (Netherlands)

19 June 2000
20:45

Italy	2–1	Sweden
Di Biagio 39'; Del Piero 88'	Report	Larsson 77'

Philips Stadion, Eindhoven
Attendance: 30,000
Referee: Vítor Melo Pereira (Portugal)

== Euro 2004 ==
=== Group stage ===
Pos	Team	Pld	W	D	L	GF	GA	GD	Pts	Qualification
1	Sweden	3	1	2	0	8	3	+5	5 (Note: Tied on head-to-head points (2) and goal difference (0). Head-to-head goals for: Sweden 3, Denmark 2, Italy 1.)	Advance to knockout stage
2	Denmark	3	1	2	0	4	2	+2	5	Advance to knockout stage
3	Italy	3	1	2	0	3	2	+1	5	
4	Bulgaria	3	0	0	3	1	9	−8	0	

Source: UEFA
Rules for classification: Group stage tiebreakers
Notes:
14 June 2004
19:45

Sweden	5–0	Bulgaria
Ljungberg 32'; Larsson 57', 58'; Ibrahimović 78' (pen.); Allbäck 90+1'	Report

Estádio José Alvalade, Lisbon
Attendance: 31,652
Referee: Mike Riley (England)

18 June 2004
19:45

Italy	1–1	Sweden
Cassano 37'	Report	Ibrahimović 85'

Estádio do Dragão, Porto
Attendance: 44,926
Referee: Urs Meier (Switzerland)

22 June 2004
19:45

Denmark	2–2	Sweden
Tomasson 28', 66'	Report	Larsson 47' (pen.); Jonson 89'

Estádio do Bessa, Porto
Attendance: 26,115
Referee: Markus Merk (Germany)

=== Knockout stage ===
Quarter-finals

26 June 2004
19:45

Sweden	0–0 (a.e.t.)	Netherlands
	Report
Penalties
Källström (penalty scored); Larsson (penalty scored); Ibrahimović (penalty missed); Ljungberg (penalty scored); Wilhelmsson (penalty scored); Mellberg (penalty missed)	4–5	(penalty scored) Van Nistelrooy; (penalty scored) Heitinga; (penalty scored) Reiziger; (penalty missed) Cocu; (penalty scored) Makaay; (penalty scored) Robben

Estádio Algarve, Faro/Loulé
Attendance: 27,762
Referee: Ľuboš Micheľ (Slovakia)

== Euro 2008 ==
=== Group stage ===
Pos	Team	Pld	W	D	L	GF	GA	GD	Pts	Qualification
1	Spain	3	3	0	0	8	3	+5	9	Advance to knockout stage
2	Russia	3	2	0	1	4	4	0	6	Advance to knockout stage
3	Sweden	3	1	0	2	3	4	−1	3	
4	Greece	3	0	0	3	1	5	−4	0	

Source: UEFA
Rules for classification: Group stage tiebreakers
10 June 2008
20:45

Greece	0–2	Sweden
	Report	Ibrahimović 67'; Hansson 72'

Stadion Wals-Siezenheim, Salzburg
Attendance: 31,063
Referee: Massimo Busacca (Switzerland)

14 June 2008
18:00

Sweden	1–2	Spain
Ibrahimović 34'	Report	Torres 15'; Villa 90+2'

Tivoli-Neu, Innsbruck
Attendance: 30,772
Referee: Pieter Vink (Netherlands)

18 June 2008
20:45

Russia	2–0	Sweden
Pavlyuchenko 24'; Arshavin 50'	Report

Tivoli-Neu, Innsbruck
Attendance: 30,772
Referee: Frank De Bleeckere (Belgium)

== Euro 2012 ==
=== Group stage ===
Pos	Team	Pld	W	D	L	GF	GA	GD	Pts	Qualification
1	England	3	2	1	0	5	3	+2	7	Advance to knockout stage
2	France	3	1	1	1	3	3	0	4	Advance to knockout stage
3	Ukraine (H)	3	1	0	2	2	4	−2	3 (Note: Head-to-head result: Ukraine 2–1 Sweden.)	
4	Sweden	3	1	0	2	5	5	0	3	

Source: UEFA
Rules for classification: Group stage tiebreakers
(H) Hosts
Notes:
11 June 2012
21:45 EEST

Ukraine	2–1	Sweden
Shevchenko 55', 61'	Report	Ibrahimović 52'

Olympic Stadium, Kyiv
Attendance: 64,290
Referee: Cüneyt Çakır (Turkey)

15 June 2012
22:00 EEST (Note: The match, originally scheduled for 21:45 local time, was delayed 15 minutes to prevent overlap with the other Group D match between Ukraine and France, which had been delayed due to rain.)

Sweden	2–3	England
Johnson 49' (o.g.); Mellberg 59'	Report	Carroll 23'; Walcott 64'; Welbeck 78'

Olympic Stadium, Kyiv
Attendance: 64,640
Referee: Damir Skomina (Slovenia)

19 June 2012
21:45 EEST

Sweden	2–0	France
Ibrahimović 54'; Larsson 90+1'	Report

Olympic Stadium, Kyiv
Attendance: 63,010
Referee: Pedro Proença (Portugal)

== Euro 2016 ==
=== Group stage ===
Pos	Team	Pld	W	D	L	GF	GA	GD	Pts	Qualification
1	Italy	3	2	0	1	3	1	+2	6 (Note: Head-to-head result: Belgium 0–2 Italy.)	Advance to knockout stage
2	Belgium	3	2	0	1	4	2	+2	6	Advance to knockout stage
3	Republic of Ireland	3	1	1	1	2	4	−2	4	Advance to knockout stage
4	Sweden	3	0	1	2	1	3	−2	1	

Source: UEFA
Rules for classification: Group stage tiebreakers
Notes:
13 June 2016
18:00

Republic of Ireland	1–1	Sweden
Hoolahan 48'	Report	Clark 71' (o.g.)

Stade de France, Saint-Denis
Attendance: 73,419
Referee: Milorad Mažić (Serbia)

17 June 2016
15:00

Italy	1–0	Sweden
Éder 88'	Report

Stadium Municipal, Toulouse
Attendance: 29,600
Referee: Viktor Kassai (Hungary)

22 June 2016
21:00

Sweden	0–1	Belgium
	Report	Nainggolan 84'

Stade de Nice, Nice
Attendance: 34,011
Referee: Felix Brych (Germany)

== Euro 2020 ==
=== Group stage ===
Pos	Team	Pld	W	D	L	GF	GA	GD	Pts	Qualification
1	Sweden	3	2	1	0	4	2	+2	7	Advance to knockout stage
2	Spain (H)	3	1	2	0	6	1	+5	5	Advance to knockout stage
3	Slovakia	3	1	0	2	2	7	−5	3	
4	Poland	3	0	1	2	4	6	−2	1	

Source: UEFA
Rules for classification: Group stage tiebreakers
(H) Hosts
14 June 2021
21:00

Spain	0–0	Sweden
	Report

Estadio de La Cartuja, Seville
Attendance: 10,559
Referee: Slavko Vinčić (Slovenia)

18 June 2021
15:00 (16:00 UTC+3)

Sweden	1–0	Slovakia
Forsberg 77' (pen.)	Report

Krestovsky Stadium, Saint Petersburg
Attendance: 11,525
Referee: Daniel Siebert (Germany)

23 June 2021
18:00 (19:00 UTC+3)

Sweden	3–2	Poland
Forsberg 2', 59'; Claesson 90+4'	Report	Lewandowski 61', 84'

Krestovsky Stadium, Saint Petersburg
Attendance: 14,252
Referee: Michael Oliver (England)

=== Knockout stage ===
Round of 16

29 June 2021
21:00 (20:00 UTC+1)

Sweden	1–2 (a.e.t.)	Ukraine
Forsberg 43'	Report	Zinchenko 27'; Dovbyk 120+1'

Hampden Park, Glasgow
Attendance: 9,221
Referee: Daniele Orsato (Italy)

== Goalscorers ==
Player	Goals	1992	2000	2004	2008	2012	2016	2020
Zlatan Ibrahimović	6			2	2	2		
Emil Forsberg	4							4
Henrik Larsson	4		1	3				
Tomas Brolin	3	3						
Jan Eriksson	2	2						
Marcus Allbäck	1			1				
Kennet Andersson	1	1						
Viktor Claesson	1							1
Petter Hansson	1				1			
Mattias Jonson	1			1				
Sebastian Larsson	1					1		
Freddie Ljungberg	1			1				
Olof Mellberg	1					1		
Johan Mjällby	1		1					
Own goals	2					1	1	
Total	30	6	2	8	3	5	1	5

== See also ==
- Sweden at the FIFA World Cup

== Head-to-head record ==
Opponent	Pld	W	D	L	GF	GA	GD	Win %
Belgium	2	0	0	2	1	3	−2	0.00
Bulgaria	1	1	0	0	5	0	+5	100.00
Denmark	2	1	1	0	3	2	+1	50.00
England	2	1	0	1	4	4	+0	50.00
France	2	1	1	0	3	1	+2	50.00
Germany	1	0	0	1	2	3	−1	0.00
Greece	1	1	0	0	2	0	+2	100.00
Italy	3	0	1	2	2	4	−2	0.00
Netherlands	1	0	1	0	0	0	+0	0.00
Poland	1	1	0	0	3	2	+1	100.00
Republic of Ireland	1	0	1	0	1	1	+0	0.00
Russia	1	0	0	1	0	2	−2	0.00
Slovakia	1	1	0	0	1	0	+1	100.00
Spain	2	0	1	1	1	2	−1	0.00
Turkey	1	0	1	0	0	0	+0	0.00
Ukraine	2	0	0	2	2	4	−2	0.00
Total	24	7	7	10	30	28	+2	29.17
