= UEFA Euro 2004 Group C =

Football tournament group stage

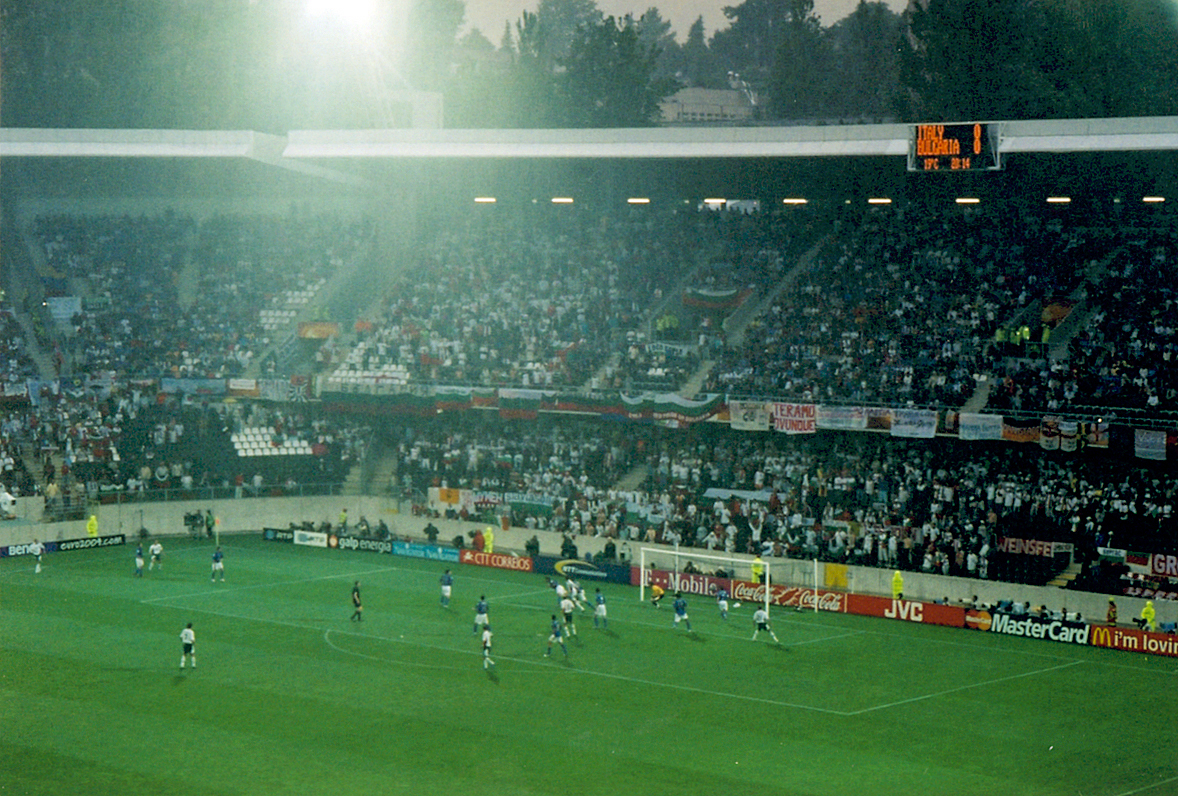
Scoreboard reads 0–0 at the match between Italy and Bulgaria on 22 June at the Estádio D. Afonso Henriques, Guimarães: Italy would go on to win 2–1, though neither side qualified for the knockout stages.

Group C of UEFA Euro 2004 was one of four groups in the final tournament's initial group stage. It began on 14 June and was completed on 22 June. The group consisted of Italy, Denmark, Sweden and Bulgaria.

Sweden won the group and advanced to the quarter-finals, along with Denmark. Italy and Bulgaria failed to advance.

Three teams – Italy, Denmark and Sweden – all finished with five points, with each team having defeated Bulgaria but drawn their two other games. As all results between the three teams in question were draws, both the points won in these games and the goal difference accrued in these games still left the teams undivided. The decisive tiebreaker was therefore the goals scored during the games between one another: Italy having scored the fewest goals of the three teams were therefore eliminated.

This became so with a 2–2 result between Denmark and Sweden in the last group game, a result that Italy knew would eliminate them and one that representatives of both teams denied would happen in advance of the game, Sweden co-coach Lars Lagerbäck quoted as saying in response to Italian questions on the likelihood of this score occurring: "I don't think it will end 2–2 — that is a very unusual result".

== Teams ==
| Draw position | Team | Pot | Method of qualification | Date of qualification | Finals appearance | Last appearance | Previous best performance | UEFA Rankings November 2003 (Note: The UEFA rankings of November 2003 were used for seeding for the final draw.) | FIFA Rankings June 2004 |
|---|---|---|---|---|---|---|---|---|---|
| C1 | Sweden | 1 | Group 4 winner | 10 September 2003 | 3rd | 2000 | Semi-finals (1992) | 3 | 18 |
| C2 | Bulgaria | 4 | Group 8 winner | 10 September 2003 | 2nd | 1996 | Group stage (1996) | 18 | 40 |
| C3 | Denmark | 3 | Group 2 winner | 11 October 2003 | 7th | 2000 | Winners (1992) | 14 | 15 |
| C4 | Italy | 2 | Group 9 winner | 11 October 2003 | 6th | 2000 | Winners (1968) | 5 | 10 |

== Standings ==
| Pos | Team | Pld | W | D | L | GF | GA | GD | Pts | Qualification |
|---|---|---|---|---|---|---|---|---|---|---|
| 1 | Sweden | 3 | 1 | 2 | 0 | 8 | 3 | +5 | 5 (Note: Tied on head-to-head points (2) and goal difference (0). Head-to-head goals for: Sweden 3, Denmark 2, Italy 1.) | Advance to knockout stage |
| 2 | Denmark | 3 | 1 | 2 | 0 | 4 | 2 | +2 | 5 | Advance to knockout stage |
| 3 | Italy | 3 | 1 | 2 | 0 | 3 | 2 | +1 | 5 | |
| 4 | Bulgaria | 3 | 0 | 0 | 3 | 1 | 9 | −8 | 0 | |

Source: UEFA
Rules for classification: Group stage tiebreakers
Notes:

In the quarter-finals,

- The winner of Group C, Sweden, advanced to play the runner-up of Group D, Netherlands.
- The runner-up of Group C, Denmark, advanced to play the winner of Group D, Czech Republic.

== Matches ==
=== Denmark vs Italy ===
14 June 2004
17:00

| Denmark | 0–0 | Italy |
|---|---|---|
| | Report |

Estádio D. Afonso Henriques, Guimarães
Attendance: 29,595
Referee: Manuel Mejuto González (Spain)

| Denmark | Italy |

| GK | 1 | Thomas Sørensen |
| RB | 6 | Thomas Helveg | (yellow card) 67' |
| CB | 4 | Martin Laursen |
| CB | 3 | René Henriksen (c) |
| LB | 5 | Niclas Jensen |
| CM | 15 | Daniel Jensen |
| CM | 17 | Christian Poulsen | | (substituted off) 76' |
| RW | 19 | Dennis Rommedahl |
| AM | 9 | Jon Dahl Tomasson | (yellow card) 29' |
| LW | 10 | Martin Jørgensen | | (substituted off) 72' |
| CF | 11 | Ebbe Sand | | (substituted off) 69' |
Substitutions:
| MF | 14 | Claus Jensen | | (substituted on) 69' |
| FW | 20 | Kenneth Perez | | (substituted on) 72' |
| DF | 18 | Brian Priske | | (substituted on) 76' |
Manager:
Morten Olsen

| GK | 1 | Gianluigi Buffon |
| RB | 2 | Christian Panucci |
| CB | 13 | Alessandro Nesta |
| CB | 5 | Fabio Cannavaro (c) | (yellow card) 62' |
| LB | 19 | Gianluca Zambrotta |
| CM | 4 | Cristiano Zanetti | | (substituted off) 57' |
| CM | 20 | Simone Perrotta |
| RW | 16 | Mauro Camoranesi | | (substituted off) 68' |
| AM | 10 | Francesco Totti | (yellow card) 90' |
| LW | 7 | Alessandro Del Piero | | (substituted off) 64' |
| CF | 9 | Christian Vieri |
Substitutions:
| MF | 8 | Gennaro Gattuso | (yellow card) 81' | (substituted on) 57' |
| FW | 18 | Antonio Cassano | (yellow card) 70' | (substituted on) 64' |
| MF | 14 | Stefano Fiore | | (substituted on) 68' |
Manager:
Giovanni Trapattoni

Man of the Match:
Thomas Sørensen (Denmark)

Assistant referees:
Rafael Guerrero Alonso (Spain)
Oscar Martínez Samaniego (Spain)
Fourth official:
Frank De Bleeckere (Belgium)

=== Sweden vs Bulgaria ===
14 June 2004
19:45

| Sweden | 5–0 | Bulgaria |
|---|---|---|
| Ljungberg 32'; Larsson 57', 58'; Ibrahimović 78' (pen.); Allbäck 90+1' | Report |

Estádio José Alvalade, Lisbon
Attendance: 31,652
Referee: Mike Riley (England)

| Sweden | Bulgaria |

| GK | 1 | Andreas Isaksson |
| RB | 2 | Teddy Lučić | | (substituted off) 41' |
| CB | 3 | Olof Mellberg (c) |
| CB | 15 | Andreas Jakobsson |
| LB | 5 | Erik Edman |
| DM | 6 | Tobias Linderoth | (yellow card) 52' |
| RM | 7 | Mikael Nilsson |
| CM | 8 | Anders Svensson | | (substituted off) 77' |
| LM | 9 | Freddie Ljungberg |
| CF | 10 | Zlatan Ibrahimović | (yellow card) 65' | (substituted off) 81' |
| CF | 11 | Henrik Larsson |
Substitutions:
| MF | 21 | Christian Wilhelmsson | | (substituted on) 41' |
| MF | 16 | Kim Källström | | (substituted on) 77' |
| FW | 20 | Marcus Allbäck | | (substituted on) 81' |
Managers:
Lars Lagerbäck; Tommy Söderberg

| GK | 1 | Zdravko Zdravkov |
| RB | 2 | Vladimir Ivanov | (yellow card) 70' |
| CB | 3 | Rosen Kirilov | (yellow card) 22' |
| CB | 18 | Predrag Pažin |
| LB | 4 | Ivaylo Petkov | (yellow card) 18' |
| RM | 13 | Georgi Peev |
| CM | 19 | Stiliyan Petrov (c) |
| CM | 15 | Marian Hristov |
| LM | 17 | Martin Petrov | | (substituted off) 84' |
| CF | 21 | Zoran Janković | (yellow card) 23' | (substituted off) 62' |
| CF | 9 | Dimitar Berbatov | | (substituted off) 76' |
Substitutions:
| MF | 10 | Velizar Dimitrov | | (substituted on) 62' |
| FW | 16 | Vladimir Manchev | | (substituted on) 76' |
| FW | 11 | Zdravko Lazarov | | (substituted on) 84' |
Manager:
Plamen Markov

Man of the Match:
Henrik Larsson (Sweden)

Assistant referees:
Glenn Turner (England)
Philip Sharp (England)
Fourth official:
Stuart Dougal (Scotland)

=== Bulgaria vs Denmark ===
18 June 2004
17:00

| Bulgaria | 0–2 | Denmark |
|---|---|---|
| | Report | Tomasson 44'; Grønkjær 90+2' |

Estádio Municipal de Braga, Braga
Attendance: 24,131
Referee: Lucílio Batista (Portugal)

| Bulgaria | Denmark |

| GK | 1 | Zdravko Zdravkov |
| RB | 2 | Vladimir Ivanov | | (substituted off) 51' |
| CB | 3 | Rosen Kirilov | (yellow card) 4' |
| CB | 22 | Ilian Stoyanov | (yellow card) 50' |
| LB | 4 | Ivaylo Petkov | | (substituted off) 40' |
| RM | 13 | Georgi Peev |
| CM | 15 | Marian Hristov | (yellow card) 82' |
| CM | 19 | Stiliyan Petrov (c) | (yellow card) 77' (yellow-red card) 83' |
| LM | 17 | Martin Petrov | (yellow card) 84' |
| SS | 21 | Zoran Janković | | (substituted off) 81' |
| CF | 9 | Dimitar Berbatov |
Substitutions:
| DF | 5 | Zlatomir Zagorčić | (yellow card) 80' | (substituted on) 40' |
| FW | 11 | Zdravko Lazarov | | (substituted on) 51' |
| MF | 8 | Milen Petkov | | (substituted on) 81' |
Manager:
Plamen Markov

| GK | 1 | Thomas Sørensen |
| RB | 6 | Thomas Helveg |
| CB | 4 | Martin Laursen |
| CB | 3 | René Henriksen (c) |
| LB | 5 | Niclas Jensen | (yellow card) 10' |
| CM | 15 | Daniel Jensen |
| CM | 7 | Thomas Gravesen |
| AM | 9 | Jon Dahl Tomasson |
| RW | 19 | Dennis Rommedahl | | (substituted off) 23' |
| LW | 10 | Martin Jørgensen | | (substituted off) 72' |
| CF | 11 | Ebbe Sand | (yellow card) 58' |
Substitutions:
| MF | 8 | Jesper Grønkjær | | (substituted on) 23' |
| MF | 14 | Claus Jensen | | (substituted on) 72' |
Manager:
Morten Olsen

Man of the Match:
Thomas Gravesen (Denmark)

Assistant referees:
Paulo Januário (Portugal)
José Cardinal (Portugal)
Fourth official:
Gilles Veissière (France)

=== Italy vs Sweden ===
18 June 2004
19:45

| Italy | 1–1 | Sweden |
|---|---|---|
| Cassano 37' | Report | Ibrahimović 85' |

Estádio do Dragão, Porto
Attendance: 44,926
Referee: Urs Meier (Switzerland)

| Italy | Sweden |

| GK | 1 | Gianluigi Buffon |
| RB | 2 | Christian Panucci |
| CB | 5 | Fabio Cannavaro (c) | (yellow card) 46' |
| CB | 13 | Alessandro Nesta |
| LB | 19 | Gianluca Zambrotta | (yellow card) 58' |
| RM | 8 | Gennaro Gattuso | (yellow card) 39' | (substituted off) 76' |
| CM | 21 | Andrea Pirlo |
| LM | 20 | Simone Perrotta |
| AM | 18 | Antonio Cassano | | (substituted off) 70' |
| CF | 9 | Christian Vieri |
| CF | 7 | Alessandro Del Piero | | (substituted off) 82' |
Substitutions:
| MF | 14 | Stefano Fiore | | (substituted on) 70' |
| DF | 15 | Giuseppe Favalli | | (substituted on) 76' |
| MF | 16 | Mauro Camoranesi | | (substituted on) 82' |
Manager:
Giovanni Trapattoni

| GK | 1 | Andreas Isaksson |
| RB | 7 | Mikael Nilsson |
| CB | 3 | Olof Mellberg (c) |
| CB | 15 | Andreas Jakobsson |
| LB | 5 | Erik Edman | (yellow card) 54' | (substituted off) 77' |
| DM | 6 | Tobias Linderoth | (yellow card) 75' |
| RM | 21 | Christian Wilhelmsson | | (substituted off) 67' |
| CM | 8 | Anders Svensson | | (substituted off) 55' |
| LM | 9 | Freddie Ljungberg |
| CF | 10 | Zlatan Ibrahimović |
| CF | 11 | Henrik Larsson |
Substitutions:
| MF | 16 | Kim Källström | | (substituted on) 55' |
| FW | 18 | Mattias Jonson | | (substituted on) 67' |
| FW | 20 | Marcus Allbäck | | (substituted on) 77' |
Managers:
Lars Lagerbäck; Tommy Söderberg

Man of the Match:
Zlatan Ibrahimović (Sweden)

Assistant referees:
Rudolf Käppeli (Switzerland)
Francesco Buragina (Switzerland)
Fourth official:
Markus Merk (Germany)

=== Italy vs Bulgaria ===
22 June 2004
19:45

| Italy | 2–1 | Bulgaria |
|---|---|---|
| Perrotta 48'; Cassano 90+4' | Report | M. Petrov 45' (pen.) |

Estádio D. Afonso Henriques, Guimarães
Attendance: 16,002
Referee: Valentin Ivanov (Russia)

| Italy | Bulgaria |

| GK | 1 | Gianluigi Buffon |
| RB | 2 | Christian Panucci |
| CB | 13 | Alessandro Nesta |
| CB | 23 | Marco Materazzi | (yellow card) 44' | (substituted off) 83' |
| LB | 19 | Gianluca Zambrotta |
| RM | 20 | Simone Perrotta | | (substituted off) 68' |
| CM | 21 | Andrea Pirlo |
| LM | 14 | Stefano Fiore |
| RF | 18 | Antonio Cassano |
| CF | 11 | Bernardo Corradi | | (substituted off) 53' |
| LF | 7 | Alessandro Del Piero (c) |
Substitutions:
| FW | 9 | Christian Vieri | | (substituted on) 53' |
| DF | 3 | Massimo Oddo | | (substituted on) 68' |
| FW | 17 | Marco Di Vaio | | (substituted on) 83' |
Manager:
Giovanni Trapattoni

| GK | 1 | Zdravko Zdravkov (c) |
| RB | 7 | Daniel Borimirov |
| CB | 18 | Predrag Pažin | | (substituted off) 64' |
| CB | 5 | Zlatomir Zagorčić |
| LB | 22 | Ilian Stoyanov | (yellow card) 66' |
| CM | 15 | Marian Hristov | | (substituted off) 79' |
| CM | 8 | Milen Petkov |
| RW | 11 | Zdravko Lazarov | (yellow card) 80' |
| AM | 21 | Zoran Janković | | (substituted off) 46' |
| LW | 17 | Martin Petrov | (yellow card) 45' |
| CF | 9 | Dimitar Berbatov |
Substitutions:
| FW | 20 | Valeri Bojinov | (yellow card) 49' | (substituted on) 46' |
| DF | 6 | Kiril Kotev | | (substituted on) 64' |
| MF | 10 | Velizar Dimitrov | | (substituted on) 79' |
Manager:
Plamen Markov

Man of the Match:
Antonio Cassano (Italy)

Assistant referees:
Yuri Dupanov (Belarus)
Vladimir Eniutin (Russia)
Fourth official:
Alain Hamer (Luxembourg)

=== Denmark vs Sweden ===
22 June 2004
19:45

| Denmark | 2–2 | Sweden |
|---|---|---|
| Tomasson 28', 66' | Report | Larsson 47' (pen.); Jonson 89' |

Estádio do Bessa, Porto
Attendance: 26,115
Referee: Markus Merk (Germany)

| Denmark | Sweden |

| GK | 1 | Thomas Sørensen |
| RB | 6 | Thomas Helveg |
| CB | 4 | Martin Laursen |
| CB | 3 | René Henriksen (c) |
| LB | 5 | Niclas Jensen | (substituted off) 46' |
| CM | 15 | Daniel Jensen | (substituted off) 66' |
| CM | 7 | Thomas Gravesen |
| AM | 9 | Jon Dahl Tomasson |
| RW | 8 | Jesper Grønkjær |
| LW | 10 | Martin Jørgensen | (substituted off) 57' |
| CF | 11 | Ebbe Sand |
Substitutions:
| DF | 2 | Kasper Bøgelund | (substituted on) 46' |
| MF | 19 | Dennis Rommedahl | (substituted on) 57' |
| MF | 17 | Christian Poulsen | (substituted on) 66' |
Manager:
Morten Olsen

| GK | 1 | Andreas Isaksson |
| RB | 7 | Mikael Nilsson |
| CB | 3 | Olof Mellberg (c) |
| CB | 15 | Andreas Jakobsson |
| LB | 5 | Erik Edman | (yellow card) 36' |
| DM | 17 | Anders Andersson | | (substituted off) 81' |
| RM | 18 | Mattias Jonson |
| CM | 16 | Kim Källström | (yellow card) 63' | (substituted off) 72' |
| LM | 9 | Freddie Ljungberg |
| CF | 10 | Zlatan Ibrahimović |
| CF | 11 | Henrik Larsson |
Substitutions:
| MF | 21 | Christian Wilhelmsson | | (substituted on) 72' |
| FW | 20 | Marcus Allbäck | | (substituted on) 81' |
Managers:
Lars Lagerbäck; Tommy Söderberg

Man of the Match:
Jon Dahl Tomasson (Denmark)

Assistant referees:
Christian Schräer (Germany)
Jan-Hendrik Salver (Germany)
Fourth official:
Mike Riley (England)

== See also ==
- Bulgaria at the UEFA European Championship
- Denmark at the UEFA European Championship
- Italy at the UEFA European Championship
- Sweden at the UEFA European Championship
