= UEFA Euro 2004 knockout stage =

The knockout stage of UEFA Euro 2004 was a single-elimination tournament involving the eight teams that qualified from the group stage of the tournament. There were three rounds of matches, with each round eliminating half of the teams entering that round, culminating in the final to decide the champions. The knockout stage began with the quarter-finals on 24 June and ended with the final on 4 July 2004 at the Estádio da Luz in Lisbon. Greece won the tournament with a 1–0 victory over the host nation Portugal.

All times Western European Summer Time (UTC+1)

== Format ==
Any game in the knockout stage that was undecided by the end of the regular 90 minutes, was followed by up to 30 minutes of extra time (two 15-minute halves). For the first time in an international football tournament, the silver goal system was applied, whereby the team who leads the game at the half-time break during the extra time period would be declared the winner. If the scores were still level after the initial 15 minutes of extra time play would continue for a further 15 minutes. If the teams could still not be separated there would be a penalty shoot-out (five penalties each, unless one team gained an unassailable lead, but more if scores were level after the initial five) to determine who progressed to the next round. As with every tournament since UEFA Euro 1984, there was no third place play-off.

== Qualified teams ==
The top two placed teams from each of the four groups qualified for the knockout stage.

Group	Winners	Runners-up
A	Portugal	Greece
B	France	England
C	Sweden	Denmark
D	Czech Republic	Netherlands

== Bracket ==
Quarter-finals
24 June – Lisbon (Luz)
Portugal (p)	2 (6)
England	2 (5)
26 June – Faro/Loulé
Sweden	0 (4)
Netherlands (p)	0 (5)
25 June – Lisbon (Alvalade)
France	0
Greece	1
27 June – Porto (Dragão)
Czech Republic	3
Denmark	0

Semi-finals
30 June – Lisbon (Alvalade)
Portugal	2
Netherlands	1
1 July – Porto (Dragão)
Greece (s.g.)	1
Czech Republic	0

Final
4 July – Lisbon (Luz)
Portugal	0
Greece	1

== Quarter-finals ==
=== Portugal vs England ===
24 June 2004
19:45

Portugal	2–2 (a.e.t.)	England
Postiga 83'; Rui Costa 110'	Report	Owen 3'; Lampard 115'
Penalties
Deco (penalty scored); Simão (penalty scored); Rui Costa (penalty missed); Ronaldo (penalty scored); Maniche (penalty scored); Postiga (penalty scored); Ricardo (penalty scored)	6–5	(penalty missed) Beckham; (penalty scored) Owen; (penalty scored) Lampard; (penalty scored) Terry; (penalty scored) Hargreaves; (penalty scored) A. Cole; (penalty missed) Vassell

Estádio da Luz, Lisbon
Attendance: 62,564
Referee: Urs Meier (Switzerland)

Portugal	England

GK	1	Ricardo
RB	13	Miguel		(substituted off) 79'
CB	16	Ricardo Carvalho	(yellow card) 119'
CB	4	Jorge Andrade
LB	14	Nuno Valente
CM	6	Costinha	(yellow card) 56'	(substituted off) 63'
CM	18	Maniche
RW	7	Luís Figo (c)		(substituted off) 75'
AM	20	Deco	(yellow card) 85'
LW	17	Cristiano Ronaldo
CF	21	Nuno Gomes
Substitutions:
FW	11	Simão Sabrosa		(substituted on) 63'
FW	23	Hélder Postiga		(substituted on) 75'
MF	10	Rui Costa		(substituted on) 79'
Manager:
(Brazil) Luiz Felipe Scolari

GK	1	David James
RB	2	Gary Neville	(yellow card) 45'
CB	5	John Terry
CB	6	Sol Campbell
LB	3	Ashley Cole
RM	7	David Beckham (c)
CM	11	Frank Lampard
CM	4	Steven Gerrard	(yellow card) 37'	(substituted off) 81'
LM	8	Paul Scholes		(substituted off) 57'
CF	10	Michael Owen
CF	9	Wayne Rooney		(substituted off) 27'
Substitutions:
FW	23	Darius Vassell		(substituted on) 27'
DF	14	Phil Neville	(yellow card) 92'	(substituted on) 57'
MF	18	Owen Hargreaves		(substituted on) 81'
Manager:
(Sweden) Sven-Göran Eriksson

Man of the Match:
Ricardo Carvalho (Portugal)

Assistant referees:
Rudolf Käppeli (Switzerland)
Francesco Buragina (Switzerland)
Fourth official:
Alain Hamer (Luxembourg)

=== France vs Greece ===
France players Zinedine Zidane and Lilian Thuram set a new record for UEFA Euro fixture appearances by playing their 14th matches each since 1996, beating the record they had held jointly with seven players.

Greece had the better of the chances in the opening half of the match and came close to the opening goal after 15 minutes when a Giorgos Karagounis free kick reached Kostas Katsouranis, who was close to the France goal. His attempted tap-in from close range was blocked by France goalkeeper Fabien Barthez on the line, whilst the Greeks already started celebrating in anticipation of the goal being awarded. After 37 minutes, Barthez tipped a powerful 30-metre shot from defender Takis Fyssas over the crossbar.

France's first meaningful effort on goal came to Thierry Henry after 24 minutes, with his powerful header going just wide of the Greece goal.

In the second half, France showed more attacking intent, but near misses by William Gallas and Henry kept the game scoreless. Midway through the second half, Theodoros Zagorakis ran down the right, crossing to Angelos Charisteas, who scored via a powerful header.

In search of an equalizer, France coach Jacques Santini brought on Sylvain Wiltord and Louis Saha for Olivier Dacourt and David Trezeguet. Saha and Henry both had shots on goal in the latter part of the second half, and Henry's header went just wide of the Greece goal with three minutes remaining.

Greece held on for the victory and proceeded to face Czech Republic in the semifinals. After the match, Santini stepped down as France coach, and goalscorer Angelos Charisteas labelled the victory against France as the greatest moment in Greek football.

25 June 2004
19:45

France	0–1	Greece
	Report	Charisteas 65'

Estádio José Alvalade, Lisbon
Attendance: 45,390
Referee: Anders Frisk (Sweden)

France	Greece

GK	16	Fabien Barthez
RB	5	William Gallas
CB	15	Lilian Thuram
CB	13	Mikaël Silvestre
LB	3	Bixente Lizarazu
RM	10	Zinedine Zidane (c)	(yellow card) 44'
CM	17	Olivier Dacourt		(substituted off) 72'
CM	6	Claude Makélélé
LM	7	Robert Pires		(substituted off) 79'
CF	20	David Trezeguet		(substituted off) 72'
CF	12	Thierry Henry
Substitutions:
FW	11	Sylvain Wiltord		(substituted on) 72'
FW	9	Louis Saha	(yellow card) 86'	(substituted on) 72'
MF	14	Jérôme Rothen		(substituted on) 79'
Manager:
Jacques Santini

GK	1	Antonios Nikopolidis
RB	2	Giourkas Seitaridis
CB	5	Traianos Dellas
CB	19	Michalis Kapsis
LB	14	Takis Fyssas
RM	6	Angelos Basinas		(substituted off) 85'
CM	21	Kostas Katsouranis
LM	20	Giorgos Karagounis	(yellow card) 6'
AM	7	Theodoros Zagorakis (c)	(yellow card) 50'
AM	11	Demis Nikolaidis		(substituted off) 61'
CF	9	Angelos Charisteas
Substitutions:
MF	23	Vasilios Lakis		(substituted on) 61'
MF	10	Vasilios Tsiartas		(substituted on) 85'
Manager:
(Germany) Otto Rehhagel

Man of the Match:
Angelos Charisteas (Greece)

Assistant referees:
Kenneth Petersson (Sweden)
Peter Ekström (Sweden)
Fourth official:
Stuart Dougal (Scotland)

=== Sweden vs Netherlands ===
26 June 2004
19:45

Sweden	0–0 (a.e.t.)	Netherlands
	Report
Penalties
Källström (penalty scored); Larsson (penalty scored); Ibrahimović (penalty missed); Ljungberg (penalty scored); Wilhelmsson (penalty scored); Mellberg (penalty missed)	4–5	(penalty scored) Van Nistelrooy; (penalty scored) Heitinga; (penalty scored) Reiziger; (penalty missed) Cocu; (penalty scored) Makaay; (penalty scored) Robben

Estádio Algarve, Faro/Loulé
Attendance: 27,762
Referee: Ľuboš Micheľ (Slovakia)

Sweden	Netherlands

GK	1	Andreas Isaksson
RB	14	Alexander Östlund	(yellow card) 88'
CB	3	Olof Mellberg (c)
CB	15	Andreas Jakobsson
LB	7	Mikael Nilsson
DM	6	Tobias Linderoth
RM	18	Mattias Jonson		(substituted off) 64'
LM	9	Freddie Ljungberg
AM	8	Anders Svensson		(substituted off) 81'
CF	10	Zlatan Ibrahimović	(yellow card) 58'
CF	11	Henrik Larsson
Substitutions:
MF	21	Christian Wilhelmsson		(substituted on) 64'
MF	16	Kim Källström		(substituted on) 81'
Managers:
Lars Lagerbäck; Tommy Söderberg

GK	1	Edwin van der Sar
RB	2	Michael Reiziger
CB	3	Jaap Stam
CB	15	Frank de Boer (c)	(yellow card) 30'	(substituted off) 35'
LB	5	Giovanni van Bronckhorst
CM	8	Edgar Davids		(substituted off) 61'
CM	20	Clarence Seedorf
CM	6	Phillip Cocu
RW	7	Andy van der Meyde	(yellow card) 48'	(substituted off) 87'
LW	19	Arjen Robben
CF	10	Ruud van Nistelrooy
Substitutions:
DF	4	Wilfred Bouma		(substituted on) 35'
DF	18	John Heitinga		(substituted on) 61'
FW	12	Roy Makaay	(yellow card) 116'	(substituted on) 87'
Manager:
Dick Advocaat

Man of the Match:
Ruud van Nistelrooy (Netherlands)

Assistant referees:
Igor Šramka (Slovakia)
Martin Balko (Slovakia)
Fourth official:
Markus Merk (Germany)

=== Czech Republic vs Denmark ===
27 June 2004
19:45

Czech Republic	3–0	Denmark
Koller 49'; Baroš 63', 65'	Report

Estádio do Dragão, Porto
Attendance: 41,092
Referee: Valentin Ivanov (Russia)

Czech Republic	Denmark

GK	1	Petr Čech
RB	13	Martin Jiránek		(substituted off) 39'
CB	21	Tomáš Ujfaluši	(yellow card) 45'
CB	5	René Bolf		(substituted off) 65'
LB	6	Marek Jankulovski	(yellow card) 10'
DM	4	Tomáš Galásek
RM	8	Karel Poborský
CM	10	Tomáš Rosický
LM	11	Pavel Nedvěd (c)	(yellow card) 61'
CF	9	Jan Koller
CF	15	Milan Baroš		(substituted off) 70'
Substitutions:
DF	2	Zdeněk Grygera		(substituted on) 39'
DF	22	David Rozehnal		(substituted on) 65'
FW	18	Marek Heinz		(substituted on) 70'
Manager:
Karel Brückner

GK	1	Thomas Sørensen
RB	6	Thomas Helveg
CB	4	Martin Laursen
CB	3	René Henriksen (c)
LB	2	Kasper Bøgelund	(yellow card) 56'
CM	17	Christian Poulsen	(yellow card) 51'
CM	14	Claus Jensen		(substituted off) 71'
CM	7	Thomas Gravesen	(yellow card) 77'
RW	8	Jesper Grønkjær		(substituted off) 77'
LW	10	Martin Jørgensen		(substituted off) 85'
CF	9	Jon Dahl Tomasson
Substitutions:
FW	21	Peter Madsen		(substituted on) 71'
MF	19	Dennis Rommedahl		(substituted on) 77'
FW	23	Peter Løvenkrands		(substituted on) 85'
Manager:
Morten Olsen

Man of the Match:
Milan Baroš (Czech Republic)

Assistant referees:
Vladimir Eniutin (Russia)
Yuri Dupanov (Belarus)
Fourth official:
Urs Meier (Switzerland)

== Semi-finals ==
=== Portugal vs Netherlands ===
30 June 2004
19:45

Portugal	2–1	Netherlands
Ronaldo 26'; Maniche 58'	Report	Andrade 63' (o.g.)

Estádio José Alvalade, Lisbon
Attendance: 46,679
Referee: Anders Frisk (Sweden)

Portugal	Netherlands

GK	1	Ricardo
RB	13	Miguel
CB	4	Jorge Andrade
CB	16	Ricardo Carvalho
LB	14	Nuno Valente	(yellow card) 44'
CM	18	Maniche		(substituted off) 87'
CM	6	Costinha
RW	17	Cristiano Ronaldo	(yellow card) 27'	(substituted off) 68'
AM	20	Deco
LW	7	Luís Figo (c)	(yellow card) 90'
CF	9	Pauleta		(substituted off) 75'
Substitutions:
MF	8	Petit		(substituted on) 68'
FW	21	Nuno Gomes		(substituted on) 75'
DF	5	Fernando Couto		(substituted on) 87'
Manager:
(Brazil) Luiz Felipe Scolari

GK	1	Edwin van der Sar
RB	2	Michael Reiziger
CB	3	Jaap Stam
CB	4	Wilfred Bouma		(substituted off) 56'
LB	5	Giovanni van Bronckhorst
CM	8	Edgar Davids
CM	20	Clarence Seedorf
CM	6	Phillip Cocu (c)
RW	16	Marc Overmars	(yellow card) 39'	(substituted off) 46'
LW	19	Arjen Robben	(yellow card) 71'	(substituted off) 81'
CF	10	Ruud van Nistelrooy
Substitutions:
FW	12	Roy Makaay		(substituted on) 46'
MF	11	Rafael van der Vaart		(substituted on) 56'
FW	17	Pierre van Hooijdonk		(substituted on) 81'
Manager:
Dick Advocaat

Man of the Match:
Luís Figo (Portugal)

Assistant referees:
Kenneth Petersson (Sweden)
Peter Ekström (Sweden)
Fourth official:
Ľuboš Micheľ (Slovakia)

=== Greece vs Czech Republic ===
Czech Republic came into the fixture on the back of four successive wins and made the brighter start, coming close to opening the scoring after only three minutes when a powerful volley by Tomáš Rosický struck the crossbar. Two minutes later, Marek Jankulovski's shot tested Greece goalkeeper Antonios Nikopolidis who parried the shot wide for a corner. Nikopolidis pulled off another fine save on 33 minutes, going full length to parry away Jankulovski's shot following Rosický's cross.

Greece had their share of chances, particularly in the second half–Zisis Vryzas sent a header from Angelos Basinas' free-kick into Petr Čech's arms, and Milan Baroš made his way inside the penalty box but misfired his shot.

In extra time, Traianos Dellas almost scored for Greece, but his effort was saved by Čech. With only minutes remaining of the first period of extra-time, Dellas won the game for Greece with a header from a corner, which ended up being a silver goal.

With the victory, Greece proceeded to play Portugal in the final, marking the first time at a major men's football tournament that two teams who played the opening match qualified for the final. The fixture was also the first time that a European Championship match was decided by a silver goal.

1 July 2004
19:45

Greece	1–0 (a.e.t./s.g.)	Czech Republic
Dellas 105+1'	Report

Estádio do Dragão, Porto
Attendance: 42,449
Referee: Pierluigi Collina (Italy)

Greece	Czech Republic

GK	1	Antonios Nikopolidis
RB	2	Giourkas Seitaridis	(yellow card) 23'
CB	19	Michalis Kapsis
CB	5	Traianos Dellas
LB	14	Takis Fyssas
CM	7	Theodoros Zagorakis (c)
CM	21	Kostas Katsouranis
CM	6	Angelos Basinas		(substituted off) 72'
RF	9	Angelos Charisteas	(yellow card) 70'
CF	15	Zisis Vryzas		(substituted off) 91'
LF	20	Giorgos Karagounis	(yellow card) 87'
Substitutions:
MF	8	Stelios Giannakopoulos		(substituted on) 72'
MF	10	Vasilios Tsiartas		(substituted on) 91'
Manager:
(Germany) Otto Rehhagel

GK	1	Petr Čech
RB	2	Zdeněk Grygera
CB	5	René Bolf
CB	21	Tomáš Ujfaluši
LB	6	Marek Jankulovski
DM	4	Tomáš Galásek	(yellow card) 48'
RM	8	Karel Poborský
CM	10	Tomáš Rosický
LM	11	Pavel Nedvěd (c)		(substituted off) 40'
CF	9	Jan Koller
CF	15	Milan Baroš	(yellow card) 102'
Substitutions:
MF	7	Vladimír Šmicer	(yellow card) 55'	(substituted on) 40'
Manager:
Karel Brückner

Man of the Match:
Traianos Dellas (Greece)

Assistant referees:
Marco Ivaldi (Italy)
Narciso Pisacreta (Italy)
Fourth official:
Valentin Ivanov (Russia)

== Final ==
4 July 2004
19:45

Portugal	0–1	Greece
	Report	Charisteas 57'

Estádio da Luz, Lisbon
Attendance: 62,865
Referee: Markus Merk (Germany)

Portugal	Greece

GK	1	Ricardo
RB	13	Miguel		(substituted off) 43'
CB	4	Jorge Andrade
CB	16	Ricardo Carvalho
LB	14	Nuno Valente	(yellow card) 90+3'
CM	18	Maniche
CM	6	Costinha	(yellow card) 12'	(substituted off) 60'
RW	17	Cristiano Ronaldo
AM	20	Deco
LW	7	Luís Figo (c)
CF	9	Pauleta		(substituted off) 74'
Substitutions:
DF	2	Paulo Ferreira		(substituted on) 43'
MF	10	Rui Costa		(substituted on) 60'
FW	21	Nuno Gomes		(substituted on) 74'
Manager:
(Brazil) Luiz Felipe Scolari

GK	1	Antonios Nikopolidis
RB	2	Giourkas Seitaridis	(yellow card) 63'
CB	19	Michalis Kapsis
CB	5	Traianos Dellas
LB	14	Takis Fyssas	(yellow card) 67'
DM	21	Kostas Katsouranis
CM	7	Theodoros Zagorakis (c)
CM	6	Angelos Basinas	(yellow card) 45+2'
RW	9	Angelos Charisteas
LW	8	Stelios Giannakopoulos		(substituted off) 76'
CF	15	Zisis Vryzas		(substituted off) 81'
Substitutions:
DF	3	Stylianos Venetidis		(substituted on) 76'
FW	22	Dimitrios Papadopoulos	(yellow card) 85'	(substituted on) 81'
Manager:
(Germany) Otto Rehhagel

Man of the Match:
Theodoros Zagorakis (Greece)

Assistant referees:
Christian Schräer (Germany)
Jan-Hendrik Salver (Germany)
Fourth official:
Anders Frisk (Sweden)
