= Bulgaria at the UEFA European Championship =

International football delegation

As of 2026, Bulgaria have qualified for two UEFA European Championships, in 1996 and 2004. However, they did not survive the first round at any occasion. While Bulgaria achieved a win (and a draw) at the 1996 tournament, they lost all their matches in the 2004 edition.

== Euro 1996 ==
=== Group stage ===
Pos	Team	Pld	W	D	L	GF	GA	GD	Pts	Qualification
1	France	3	2	1	0	5	2	+3	7	Advance to knockout stage
2	Spain	3	1	2	0	4	3	+1	5	Advance to knockout stage
3	Bulgaria	3	1	1	1	3	4	−1	4	
4	Romania	3	0	0	3	1	4	−3	0	

Source: UEFA
Rules for classification: Group stage tiebreakers
9 June 1996
14:30

Spain	1–1	Bulgaria
Alfonso 74'	Report	Stoichkov 65' (pen.)

Elland Road, Leeds
Attendance: 24,006
Referee: Piero Ceccarini (Italy)

13 June 1996
16:30

Bulgaria	1–0	Romania
Stoichkov 3'	Report

St James' Park, Newcastle
Attendance: 19,107
Referee: Peter Mikkelsen (Denmark)

18 June 1996
16:30

France	3–1	Bulgaria
Blanc 21'; Penev 63' (o.g.); Loko 90'	Report	Stoichkov 69'

St James' Park, Newcastle
Attendance: 26,976
Referee: Dermot Gallagher (England) (Note: Gallagher suffered an injury in the 28th minute and was replaced by fourth official Paul Durkin (England).)

== Euro 2004 ==
=== Group stage ===
Pos	Team	Pld	W	D	L	GF	GA	GD	Pts	Qualification
1	Sweden	3	1	2	0	8	3	+5	5 (Note: Tied on head-to-head points (2) and goal difference (0). Head-to-head goals for: Sweden 3, Denmark 2, Italy 1.)	Advance to knockout stage
2	Denmark	3	1	2	0	4	2	+2	5	Advance to knockout stage
3	Italy	3	1	2	0	3	2	+1	5	
4	Bulgaria	3	0	0	3	1	9	−8	0	

Source: UEFA
Rules for classification: Group stage tiebreakers
Notes:
14 June 2004
19:45

Sweden	5–0	Bulgaria
Ljungberg 32'; Larsson 57', 58'; Ibrahimović 78' (pen.); Allbäck 90+1'	Report

Estádio José Alvalade, Lisbon
Attendance: 31,652
Referee: Mike Riley (England)

18 June 2004
17:00

Bulgaria	0–2	Denmark
	Report	Tomasson 44'; Grønkjær 90+2'

Estádio Municipal de Braga, Braga
Attendance: 24,131
Referee: Lucílio Batista (Portugal)

22 June 2004
19:45

Italy	2–1	Bulgaria
Perrotta 48'; Cassano 90+4'	Report	M. Petrov 45' (pen.)

Estádio D. Afonso Henriques, Guimarães
Attendance: 16,002
Referee: Valentin Ivanov (Russia)

== Overall record ==
UEFA European Championship record
Year	Round	Position	Pld	W	D*	L	GF	GA
(France) 1960	Did not qualify							
(Spain) 1964	Did not qualify							
(Italy) 1968	Did not qualify							
(Belgium) 1972	Did not qualify							
(Socialist Federal Republic of Yugoslavia) 1976	Did not qualify							
(Italy) 1980	Did not qualify							
(France) 1984	Did not qualify							
(West Germany) 1988	Did not qualify							
(Sweden) 1992	Did not qualify							
(England) 1996	Group stage	11th	3	1	1	1	3	4
(Belgium) (Netherlands) 2000	Did not qualify							
(Portugal) 2004	Group stage	16th	3	0	0	3	1	9
(Austria) (Switzerland) 2008	Did not qualify							
(Poland) (Ukraine) 2012	Did not qualify							
(France) 2016	Did not qualify							
(Europe) 2020	Did not qualify							
(Germany) 2024	Did not qualify							
(Republic of Ireland) (United Kingdom) 2028	To be determined							
(Italy) (Turkey) 2032	To be determined							
Total	Group stage	2/17	6	1	1	4	4	13

== See also ==
- Bulgaria at the FIFA World Cup
