= UEFA Euro 1996 Group B =

Football tournament group stage

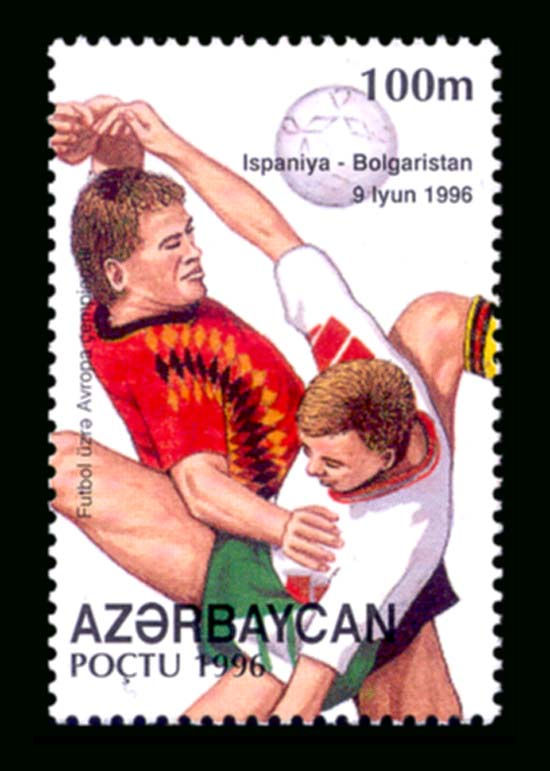
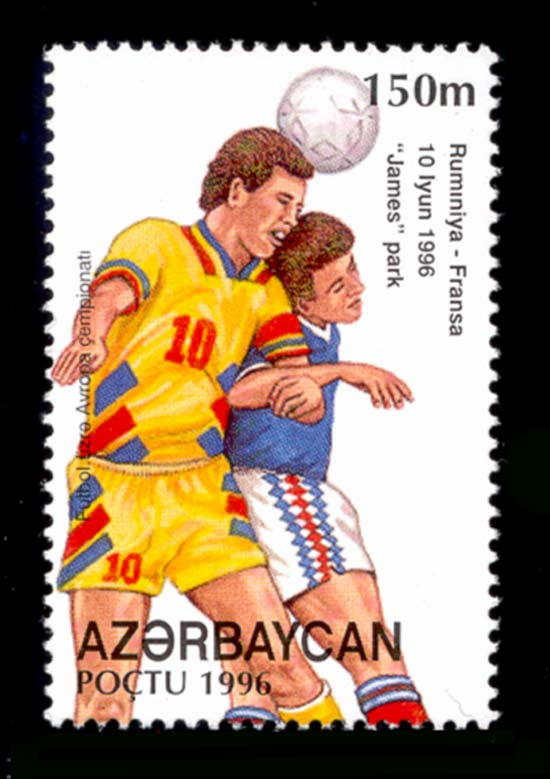
1996 Azerbaijani postage stamps depicting the first two Group B games: Spain versus Bulgaria on 9 June and Romania versus France on 10 June

Group B of UEFA Euro 1996 was one of four groups in the final tournament's initial group stage. It began on 9 June and was completed on 18 June. The group consisted of France, Spain, Bulgaria and Romania.

France won the group and advanced to the quarter-finals, along with Spain. Bulgaria and Romania failed to advance.

On the second matchday, on 13 June, the match between Bulgaria and Romania featured a ghost goal by Dorinel Munteanu: in the first half, with Romania already 1–0 down to an early Hristo Stoichkov goal, Munteanu's shot hit the crossbar, crossed the goal line by about a foot, after which it bounced back. Referee Peter Mikkelsen and his assistants did not notice and the goal was not awarded.

== Teams ==
Draw position	Team	Method of qualification	Date of qualification	Finals appearance	Last appearance	Previous best performance	FIFA Rankings May 1996
B1 (seed)	Spain	Group 2 winner	15 November 1995	5th	1988	Winners (1964)	6
B2	Bulgaria	Group 7 runner-up (2nd best runner-up)	15 November 1995	1st	—	Debut	28
B3	Romania	Group 1 winner	15 November 1995	2nd	1984	Group stage (1984)	16
B4	France	Group 1 runner-up (6th best runner-up)	15 November 1995	4th	1992	Winners (1984)	5

== Standings ==
Pos	Team	Pld	W	D	L	GF	GA	GD	Pts	Qualification
1	France	3	2	1	0	5	2	+3	7	Advance to knockout stage
2	Spain	3	1	2	0	4	3	+1	5	Advance to knockout stage
3	Bulgaria	3	1	1	1	3	4	−1	4	
4	Romania	3	0	0	3	1	4	−3	0	

Source: UEFA
Rules for classification: Group stage tiebreakers

In the quarter-finals,

- The winner of Group B, France, advanced to play the runner-up of Group A, Netherlands.
- The runner-up of Group B, Spain, advanced to play the winner of Group A, England.

== Matches ==
=== Spain vs Bulgaria ===
9 June 1996
14:30

Spain	1–1	Bulgaria
Alfonso 74'	Report	Stoichkov 65' (pen.)

Elland Road, Leeds
Attendance: 24,006
Referee: Piero Ceccarini (Italy)

Spain	Bulgaria

GK	1	Andoni Zubizarreta (c)
CB	4	Rafael Alkorta
CB	6	Fernando Hierro
CB	5	Abelardo	(yellow card) 90'
RM	3	Alberto Belsué
CM	15	José Luis Caminero	(yellow card) 27'	(substituted off) 82'
CM	18	Guillermo Amor	(yellow card) 42'	(substituted off) 70'
LM	12	Sergi	(yellow card) 39'
RF	21	Luis Enrique
CF	9	Juan Antonio Pizzi	(red card) 75'
LF	8	Julen Guerrero		(substituted off) 51'
Substitutions:
FW	7	José Amavisca		(substituted on) 51'
FW	11	Alfonso		(substituted on) 70'
MF	10	Donato		(substituted on) 82'
Manager:
Javier Clemente

GK	1	Borislav Mihaylov (c)
SW	5	Petar Hubchev	(red card) 72'
RB	2	Radostin Kishishev	(yellow card) 55'
CB	3	Trifon Ivanov
LB	4	Iliyan Kiryakov		(substituted off) 72'
DM	6	Zlatko Yankov	(yellow card) 77'
RM	7	Emil Kostadinov		(substituted off) 73'
CM	10	Krasimir Balakov
CM	11	Yordan Letchkov
LM	8	Hristo Stoichkov	(yellow card) 29'
CF	9	Lyuboslav Penev		(substituted off) 78'
Substitutions:
DF	18	Tsanko Tsvetanov		(substituted on) 72'
MF	15	Ivaylo Yordanov		(substituted on) 73'
MF	16	Daniel Borimirov		(substituted on) 78'
Manager:
Dimitar Penev

Man of the Match:
Hristo Stoichkov (Bulgaria)

Assistant referees:
Enrico Preziosi (Italy)
Fabrizio Zanforlin (Italy)
Fourth official:
Alfredo Trentalange (Italy)

=== Romania vs France ===
10 June 1996
19:30

Romania	0–1	France
	Report	Dugarry 25'

St James' Park, Newcastle
Attendance: 26,323
Referee: Hellmut Krug (Germany)

Romania	France

GK	1	Bogdan Stelea
SW	4	Miodrag Belodedici
CB	6	Gheorghe Popescu
CB	16	Gheorghe Mihali	(yellow card) 49'
RWB	2	Dan Petrescu		(substituted off) 78'
LWB	13	Tibor Selymes	(yellow card) 71'
CM	11	Dorinel Munteanu
CM	5	Ioan Lupescu
AM	10	Gheorghe Hagi (c)
CF	9	Florin Răducioiu		(substituted off) 46'
CF	7	Marius Lăcătuș		(substituted off) 56'
Substitutions:
FW	20	Viorel Moldovan		(substituted on) 46'
FW	19	Adrian Ilie	(yellow card) 90'	(substituted on) 56'
DF	17	Iulian Filipescu		(substituted on) 78'
Manager:
Anghel Iordănescu

GK	1	Bernard Lama
RB	15	Lilian Thuram
CB	5	Laurent Blanc
CB	8	Marcel Desailly
LB	3	Éric Di Meco	(yellow card) 20'	(substituted off) 68'
DM	19	Christian Karembeu
DM	7	Didier Deschamps (c)
CM	6	Vincent Guérin
AM	10	Zinedine Zidane		(substituted off) 80'
AM	9	Youri Djorkaeff
CF	13	Christophe Dugarry		(substituted off) 68'
Substitutions:
FW	11	Patrice Loko		(substituted on) 68'
DF	12	Bixente Lizarazu		(substituted on) 68'
DF	20	Alain Roche		(substituted on) 80'
Manager:
Aimé Jacquet

Man of the Match:
Youri Djorkaeff (France)

Assistant referees:
Klaus Plettenberg (Germany)
Egbert Engler (Germany)
Fourth official:
Hermann Albrecht (Germany)

=== Bulgaria vs Romania ===
13 June 1996
16:30

Bulgaria	1–0	Romania
Stoichkov 3'	Report

St James' Park, Newcastle
Attendance: 19,107
Referee: Peter Mikkelsen (Denmark)

Bulgaria	Romania

GK	1	Borislav Mihaylov (c)
RB	2	Radostin Kishishev	(yellow card) 48'
CB	3	Trifon Ivanov
CB	6	Zlatko Yankov
LB	18	Tsanko Tsvetanov
CM	10	Krasimir Balakov
CM	15	Ivaylo Yordanov
CM	11	Yordan Letchkov		(substituted off) 90'
RF	7	Emil Kostadinov		(substituted off) 32'
CF	9	Lyuboslav Penev		(substituted off) 72'
LF	8	Hristo Stoichkov
Substitutions:
MF	16	Daniel Borimirov	(yellow card) 64'	(substituted on) 32'
FW	14	Nasko Sirakov		(substituted on) 72'
MF	13	Boncho Genchev		(substituted on) 90'
Manager:
Dimitar Penev

GK	1	Bogdan Stelea
SW	4	Miodrag Belodedici
CB	6	Gheorghe Popescu	(substituted off) 78'
CB	3	Daniel Prodan
RWB	2	Dan Petrescu
LWB	13	Tibor Selymes
CM	11	Dorinel Munteanu
CM	5	Ioan Lupescu	(substituted off) 46'
AM	10	Gheorghe Hagi (c)
CF	9	Florin Răducioiu
CF	7	Marius Lăcătuș	(substituted off) 29'
Substitutions:
FW	20	Viorel Moldovan	(substituted on) 29'
MF	14	Constantin Gâlcă	(substituted on) 46'
FW	19	Adrian Ilie	(substituted on) 78'
Manager:
Anghel Iordănescu

Man of the Match:
Hristo Stoichkov (Bulgaria)

Assistant referees:
Jens Larsen (Denmark)
Henning Knudsen (Denmark)
Fourth official:
Knud Erik Fisker (Denmark)

=== France vs Spain ===
15 June 1996
18:00

France	1–1	Spain
Djorkaeff 48'	Report	Caminero 85'

Elland Road, Leeds
Attendance: 35,626
Referee: Vadim Zhuk (Belarus)

France	Spain

GK	1	Bernard Lama
RB	2	Jocelyn Angloma		(substituted off) 65'
CB	5	Laurent Blanc	(yellow card) 43'
CB	8	Marcel Desailly
LB	12	Bixente Lizarazu
DM	19	Christian Karembeu	(yellow card) 60'
DM	7	Didier Deschamps (c)
CM	6	Vincent Guérin		(substituted off) 81'
AM	10	Zinedine Zidane
AM	9	Youri Djorkaeff	(yellow card) 63'
CF	11	Patrice Loko		(substituted off) 74'
Substitutions:
DF	20	Alain Roche		(substituted on) 65'
FW	13	Christophe Dugarry		(substituted on) 74'
DF	15	Lilian Thuram		(substituted on) 81'
Manager:
Aimé Jacquet

GK	1	Andoni Zubizarreta (c)
CB	4	Rafael Alkorta
CB	2	Juanma López
CB	5	Abelardo
RWB	16	Jorge Otero	(yellow card) 56'	(substituted off) 59'
LWB	12	Sergi
DM	6	Fernando Hierro
RM	21	Luis Enrique	(yellow card) 12'	(substituted off) 55'
CM	15	José Luis Caminero
LM	7	José Amavisca	(yellow card) 53'
CF	11	Alfonso		(substituted off) 83'
Substitutions:
MF	17	Javier Manjarín		(substituted on) 55'
FW	14	Kiko		(substituted on) 59'
FW	19	Julio Salinas		(substituted on) 83'
Manager:
Javier Clemente

Man of the Match:
José Luis Caminero (Spain)

Assistant referees:
Yuri Dupanov (Belarus)
Aleh Chykun (Belarus)
Fourth official:
Kazimir Znaydinsky (Belarus)

=== France vs Bulgaria ===
18 June 1996
16:30

France	3–1	Bulgaria
Blanc 21'; Penev 63' (o.g.); Loko 90'	Report	Stoichkov 69'

St James' Park, Newcastle
Attendance: 26,976
Referee: Dermot Gallagher (England) (Note: Gallagher suffered an injury in the 28th minute and was replaced by fourth official Paul Durkin (England).)

France	Bulgaria

GK	1	Bernard Lama
RB	15	Lilian Thuram
CB	5	Laurent Blanc
CB	8	Marcel Desailly	(yellow card) 3'
LB	12	Bixente Lizarazu
DM	19	Christian Karembeu
DM	7	Didier Deschamps (c)
CM	6	Vincent Guérin
AM	10	Zinedine Zidane		(substituted off) 62'
AM	9	Youri Djorkaeff
CF	13	Christophe Dugarry	(yellow card) 36'	(substituted off) 70'
Substitutions:
MF	18	Reynald Pedros		(substituted on) 62'
FW	11	Patrice Loko		(substituted on) 70'
Manager:
Aimé Jacquet

GK	1	Borislav Mihaylov (c)
SW	5	Petar Hubchev
RB	17	Emil Kremenliev	(yellow card) 14'
CB	3	Trifon Ivanov	(yellow card) 8'
LB	18	Tsanko Tsvetanov
DM	6	Zlatko Yankov		(substituted off) 79'
RM	10	Krasimir Balakov		(substituted off) 82'
CM	15	Ivaylo Yordanov
LM	11	Yordan Letchkov
SS	8	Hristo Stoichkov
CF	9	Lyuboslav Penev
Substitutions:
MF	16	Daniel Borimirov		(substituted on) 79'
FW	20	Georgi Donkov		(substituted on) 82'
Manager:
Dimitar Penev

Man of the Match:
Laurent Blanc (France)

Assistant referees:
Phil Joslin (England)
Mark Warren (England)
Fourth official:
Paul Durkin (England)

=== Romania vs Spain ===
18 June 1996
16:30

Romania	1–2	Spain
Răducioiu 29'	Report	Manjarín 11'; Amor 84'

Elland Road, Leeds
Attendance: 32,719
Referee: Ahmet Çakar (Turkey)

Romania	Spain

GK	12	Florian Prunea
CB	6	Gheorghe Popescu	(yellow card) 14'
CB	15	Anton Doboș
CB	3	Daniel Prodan		(substituted off) 86'
RWB	2	Dan Petrescu
LWB	13	Tibor Selymes
CM	18	Ovidiu Stîngă
CM	14	Constantin Gâlcă	(yellow card) 77'
AM	10	Gheorghe Hagi (c)	(yellow card) 21'
CF	9	Florin Răducioiu		(substituted off) 77'
CF	19	Adrian Ilie	(yellow card) 47'	(substituted off) 66'
Substitutions:
MF	11	Dorinel Munteanu		(substituted on) 66'
FW	21	Ion Vlădoiu		(substituted on) 77'
MF	5	Ioan Lupescu		(substituted on) 86'
Manager:
Anghel Iordănescu

GK	1	Andoni Zubizarreta (c)
CB	4	Rafael Alkorta
CB	2	Juanma López
CB	5	Abelardo		(substituted off) 64'
RM	14	Kiko	(yellow card) 36'
CM	6	Fernando Hierro
CM	20	Miguel Ángel Nadal	(yellow card) 59'
LM	12	Sergi
RF	17	Javier Manjarín
CF	9	Juan Antonio Pizzi		(substituted off) 57'
LF	7	José Amavisca		(substituted off) 72'
Substitutions:
FW	11	Alfonso		(substituted on) 57'
MF	18	Guillermo Amor		(substituted on) 64'
MF	8	Julen Guerrero		(substituted on) 72'
Manager:
Javier Clemente

Man of the Match:
Sergi (Spain)

Assistant referees:
Akif Uğurdur (Turkey)
Turgay Güdü (Turkey)
Fourth official:
Oğuz Sarvan (Turkey)

== See also ==
- Bulgaria at the UEFA European Championship
- France at the UEFA European Championship
- Romania at the UEFA European Championship
- Spain at the UEFA European Championship
