= Lars Lagerbäck =

Swedish footballer and manager

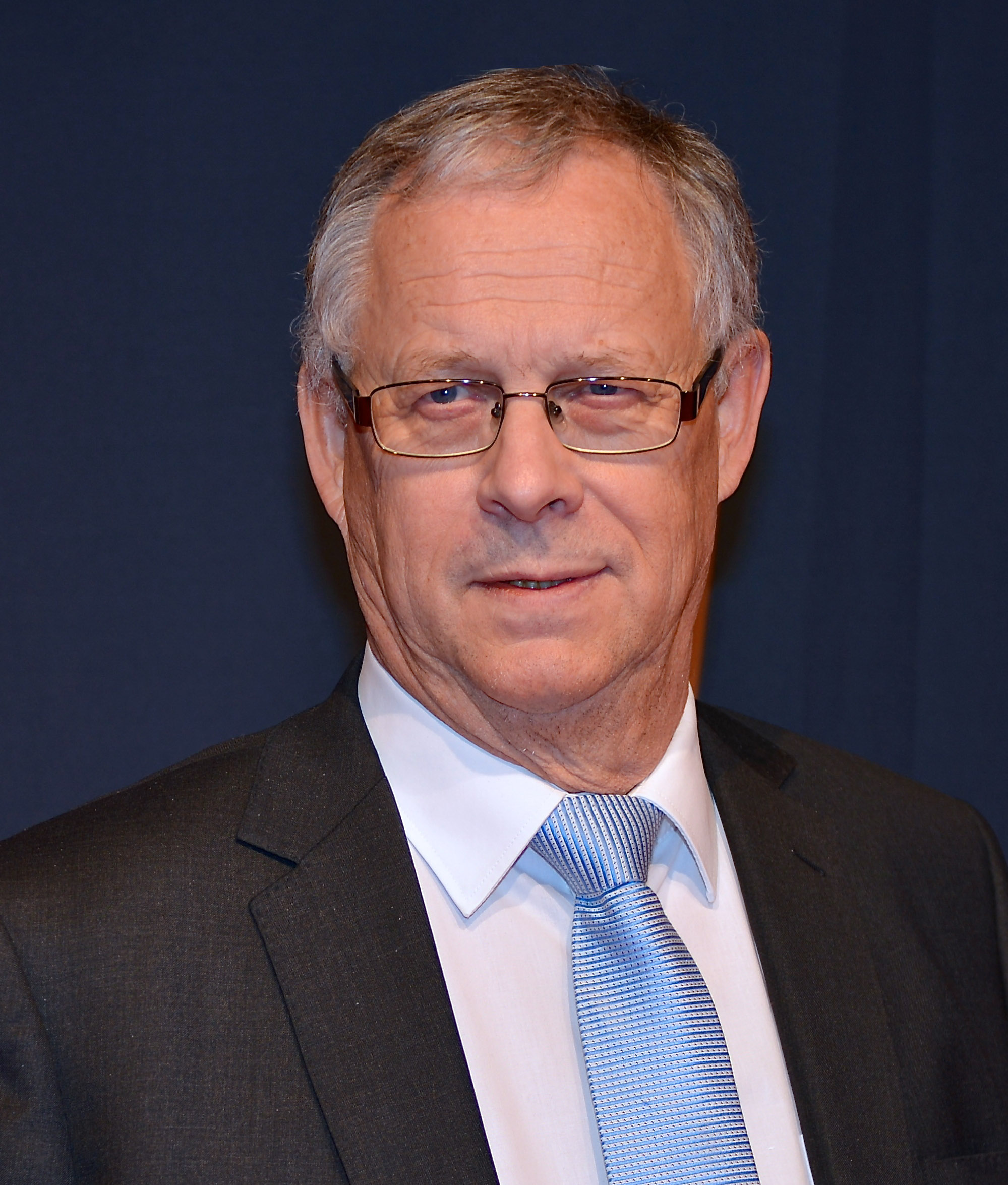
- Lars Lagerbäck in 2014

Personal information
- Full name: Lars Edvin Lagerbäck
- Date of birth: 16 July 1948 (age 78)
- Place of birth: Katrineholm, Sweden

Senior career*
Years	Team	Apps	(Gls)
1960–1969	Alby FF		
1970–1974	Gimonäs CK		

Managerial career
- 1977–1982: Kilafors IF
- 1983–1985: Arbrå BK
- 1987–1989: Hudiksvalls ABK
- 1990–1995: Sweden U16/U18
- 1996–1997: Sweden B
- 1998–1999: Sweden (assistant)
- 2000–2009: Sweden
- 2010: Nigeria
- 2011–2016: Iceland
- 2017–2020: Norway
- * Club domestic league appearances and goals

Lars Edvin "Lasse" Lagerbäck (pronounced [ˈlɑːʂ ˈlâsːɛ ˈlɑ̂ːɡɛ(r)ˌbɛk]; born 16 July 1948) is a Swedish football manager and former player.

Lagerbäck has managed a number of national teams prior to his current position. He managed the Sweden national team from 1998 until 2009, leading Sweden to five consecutive tournaments. He resigned as manager in 2009, after Sweden failed to qualify for the 2010 FIFA World Cup in South Africa. After a short stint as manager of Nigeria, he led Iceland to unprecedented success as they qualified for their first finals competition, UEFA Euro 2016, and reached the quarter-finals, beating England in the last 16. Apart from his coaching duties, Lagerbäck has in recent years been a pundit for Premier League and UEFA Champions League broadcasting on Swedish television. He currently holds the record for managing a team in the finals of the European Championships with four appearances.

== Playing career ==
Born in Katrineholm and raised in Ovansjö, Medelpad, in his youth, Lagerbäck played for Alby FF. When he was 13 years old, he began playing for their P16 team.

After completing his upper secondary school studies at the end of the 1960s, Lagerbäck studied political science and economics at Umeå University in northern Sweden. On the side of his studies, he also played football for Gimonäs CK under the guidance of Calle Lindelöf. He continued to play there until 1974 and worked as a club clerk from 1970. Over the course of the following years, he played twice for the club in the qualifying rounds to division two in the Swedish League without success. Lagerbäck himself played midfielder, but was often an unused substitute.

In 1974, he attended the Swedish School of Sport and Health Sciences, where he was a classmate of current assistant coach Roland Andersson.

== Managing career ==
=== Club-level ===
In 1977, he was called up to the senior team. It was former teammate Kjell Pettersson that recommended him to Kilafors. He coached the Division IV team until 1982. In 1983, he moved to Arbrå IK until 1985. In 1987, he took over Hudiksvall ABK but left in 1989.

=== Sweden ===
In 1990, Lagerbäck took a job with the Swedish Football Association. He began as a coach for the junior levels which included Freddie Ljungberg. He helped Tommy Svensson and Tord Grip with the Sweden national team.

In 1996, Lagerbäck took over the Sweden B national team, until 1997. In 1998, Tommy Söderberg chose him to be the assistant coach for the Sweden national team. In 2000, he was promoted to dual-coach, a responsibility he shared with Söderberg until 2004. Under their guidance, the Sweden national team qualified for UEFA Euro 2000 but was eliminated in the group stages.

In 2002, they led Sweden to the 2002 FIFA World Cup, where Sweden were drawn in the 'group of death', together with England, Argentina and Nigeria. Sweden won the group but subsequently lost against Senegal in the first knockout round. In 2004, Sweden qualified for their third straight championship. At UEFA Euro 2004, Sweden made it to the quarter-finals where they lost to the Netherlands. That same year, Tommy Söderberg left the Sweden national team to coach the Sweden U21 team.

After the departure of Söderberg, Lagerbäck appointed Roland Andersson as assistant coach. In 2006, Lagerbäck took Sweden to their fourth consecutive championship, the first time in Swedish history. He led Sweden to the 2006 FIFA World Cup, losing against Germany 2–0 in the knockout stage. Under Lagerbäck, Sweden also qualified for UEFA Euro 2008, however they were eliminated in the group stage after losing 2–0 against Russia. The team's early dismissal from the tournament led sport columnists to ask Lagerbäck to be sacked. Despite this, he signed an extension, which kept him until the end of the 2010 FIFA World Cup campaign. After Sweden's unsuccessful qualification campaign, Lagerbäck resigned and was replaced by Erik Hamrén.

=== Iceland ===
On 4 October 2011, KSÍ's chief executive Geir Þorsteinsson reported that talks had begun over the appointment of Lagerbäck as the new manager of the Icelandic national team. The appointment was then confirmed ten days later. Under Lagerbäck, Iceland qualified for the play-off stage of the qualification tournament for the 2014 FIFA World Cup, but Croatia were the victors over two legs. Shortly thereafter Lagerbäck signed a new contract, this time as joint manager with his former Iceland assistant Heimir Hallgrímsson, who took over as sole manager with Lagerbäck's retirement following UEFA Euro 2016, where Iceland famously reached the quarter-finals, beating England in the last 16. They went out to France in the quarter-finals. Lagerbäck won 30 votes as a write-in candidate in the 2016 Icelandic presidential election.

He was later (2020-2021) the technical advisor of the Iceland national football team.

=== Norway ===
On 1 February 2017, Lagerbäck was announced as the new manager for Norway, signing a contract lasting until the end of 2019. On 26 March, Lagerbäck took charge of his first game as manager of Norway, which resulted in a 2–0 defeat to Northern Ireland in Belfast. His tenure as manager was considered somewhat mixed in terms of success. In December 2020, Lagerbäck was fired from his role as national team manager, being replaced by Ståle Solbakken.

=== Managerial statistics ===
As of 18 November 2020

Sweden

Role	From	To	Record					
Role	From	To	G	W	D	L	Win %	Unbeaten %
Joint manager	2000	2004	59	26	23	10	44.07	83.05
Sole manager	2004	2009	72	31	17	24	43.06	66.67
Overall	2000	2009	131	57	40	34	43.51	74.05

Nigeria

Role	From	To	Record					
Role	From	To	G	W	D	L	Win %	Unbeaten %
Manager	2010	2010	7	2	3	2	28.57	71.43

Iceland

Role	From	To	Record					
Role	From	To	G	W	D	L	Win %	Unbeaten %
Sole manager	2011	2013	20	8	3	9	40.00	55.00
Joint manager	2013	2016	32	13	7	12	40.63	62.50
Overall	2011	2016	52	21	10	21	40.38	59.62

Norway

Role	From	To	Record					
Role	From	To	G	W	D	L	Win %	Unbeaten %
Manager	2017	2020	36	18	9	9	50.00	75.00

== Honours ==
=== Manager ===
Sweden

- King's Cup: 2001, 2003

Nigeria

- WAFU Nations Cup: 2010

== See also ==
- National team managers with 100 or more matches
