= Tommy Söderberg =

Swedish football coach

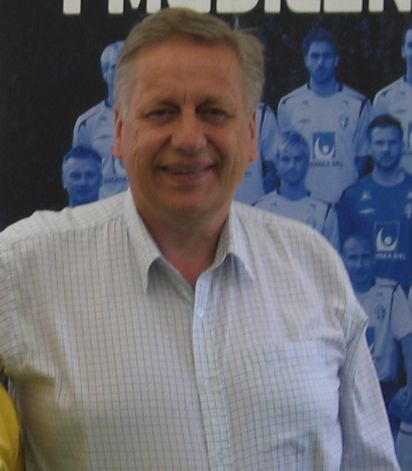
- Tommy Söderberg in June 2006

Personal information
- Date of birth: 19 August 1948 (age 78)
- Place of birth: Stockholm, Sweden

Team information
- Current team: IFK Sunne (advisor)

Senior career*
| Years | Team | Apps | (Gls) |
- Ängby IF

Managerial career
- 1972: BK Väster
- 1980–1981: Spånga IS
- 1982–1985: IF Brommapojkarna
- 1986: Djurgårdens IF (assistant)
- 1987–1989: Djurgårdens IF
- 1991–1993: AIK
- 1994–1997: Sweden U21
- 1998–2004: Sweden
- 2005–2012: Sweden U21
- * Club domestic league appearances and goals

Tommy Söderberg (born 19 August 1948) is a Swedish football manager and coach who is currently an advisor for IFK Sunne.

== Career ==
Söderberg had his active career in Stockholm clubs Ängby IF and IK Continental, before taking roles in various Stockholm clubs. Söderberg joined head coach Björn Westerberg of Djurgården as an assistant coach before the 1986 season. The following season, he became manager, first signing a one-year contract in October 1986.

As a manager, he won the Swedish league title with AIK in 1992. Later he went on to coach the Swedish U21 national team, and when Tommy Svensson left his job as national team manager in 1998, the path was open for Söderberg. He took Sweden to the Euro 2000 tournament. The same year Lars Lagerbäck was promoted from assistant coach to joint coach together with Söderberg.

Under management of the new coaching duo, Sweden qualified for the 2002 FIFA World Cup and Euro 2004. During the 2004 European Championship, Söderberg decided to leave his position after the tournament and return to coach the U21 team, which he later managed together with Jörgen Lennartsson.

In 2023, Söderberg received Fotbollskanalens Hederspris, an honorary award presented jointly by TV4 and the Swedish Football Association to recognise major contributions to Swedish football.
