= UEFA Euro 2004 =

European football competition

Campeonato Europeu de Futebol 2004 (in Portuguese)
- Vive O 2004! (Live The 2004!)

Tournament details
- Host country: Portugal
- Dates: 12 June – 4 July
- Teams: 16
- Venues: 10 (in 8 host cities)

Final positions
- Champions: Greece (1st title)
- Runners-up: Portugal
- Third place: Czech Republic; Netherlands

Tournament statistics
- Matches played: 31
- Goals scored: 77 (2.48 per match)
- Attendance: 1,160,802 (37,445 per match)
- Top scorer: (Czech Republic) Milan Baroš (5 goals)
- Best player: (Greece) Theodoros Zagorakis

The 2004 UEFA European Football Championship, commonly referred to as Euro 2004, was the 12th edition of the UEFA European Championship, a quadrennial football competition contested by the men's national teams of UEFA member associations. The final tournament was hosted for the first time in Portugal, from 12 June to 4 July 2004. A total of 31 matches were played in ten venues across eight cities – Aveiro, Braga, Coimbra, Guimarães, Faro/Loulé, Leiria, Lisbon, and Porto.

As in 1996 and 2000, the final tournament was contested by 16 teams: the hosts plus the 15 teams that came through the qualifying tournament, which began in September 2002. Latvia secured their first participation in a major tournament after overcoming Turkey in the play-offs, while Greece returned to the European Championship after 24 years.

The tournament was rich in surprises and upsets: traditional powerhouses Germany, Spain, and Italy were eliminated in the group stage, while defending champions France were knocked out in the quarter-finals by Greece. Portugal recovered from an opening defeat against Greece to reach the final, eliminating England and the Netherlands along the way. For the first time in a major European football tournament, the last match featured the same teams as the opening match. Portugal were again defeated by Greece with a goal from Angelos Charisteas. Greece's triumph was unexpected, considering that they had only qualified for two other major tournaments: UEFA Euro 1980, at which they managed just one point, and the 1994 FIFA World Cup, where they lost all three matches. As winners, Greece earned the right to represent Europe at the 2005 FIFA Confederations Cup.

During the opening ceremony, one of the tableaux depicted a ship – symbolising the voyages of the Portuguese explorers – sailing through a sea that transformed into the flags of all competing countries. In the closing ceremony, Portuguese-Canadian singer Nelly Furtado performed her single and official tournament theme song, "Força". A Greek sports commentator, Georgios Helakis, spontaneously referred to the Greek national team as “The Pirate Ship” upon seeing the Portuguese ships featured in the show. In a moment of excitement, he stated that Greece was going to “pirate” the Portuguese ship, referring to the fact that the two teams were set to face each other that night. The nickname “Pirate Ship” (Greek: «Το Πειρατικό») became emblematic of the Greek team’s unexpected triumph and is still affectionately used by Greek fans today.

== Bid process ==
Portugal were announced as hosts for UEFA Euro 2004 on 12 October 1999, in Aachen, Germany, beating Spain and the joint bid of Austria and Hungary.

== Summary ==
Group A opened with a shock as Greece, ranked outsiders from start, defeated the hosts 2–1. Giorgos Karagounis put the Greeks ahead after only seven minutes and Angelos Basinas made it 2–0 from the penalty spot on 51 minutes. A stoppage-time goal by Cristiano Ronaldo proved no more than a consolation. Greece then drew with Spain before losing to Russia in their last group stage game. Portugal recovered from their opening defeat by defeating Russia 2–0, who had their keeper Sergei Ovchinnikov sent off. Nuno Gomes scored the winning goal against Spain, which ensured Portugal finished top of Group A. Greece advanced to the quarter-finals as runners-up, ahead of Spain on goals scored.

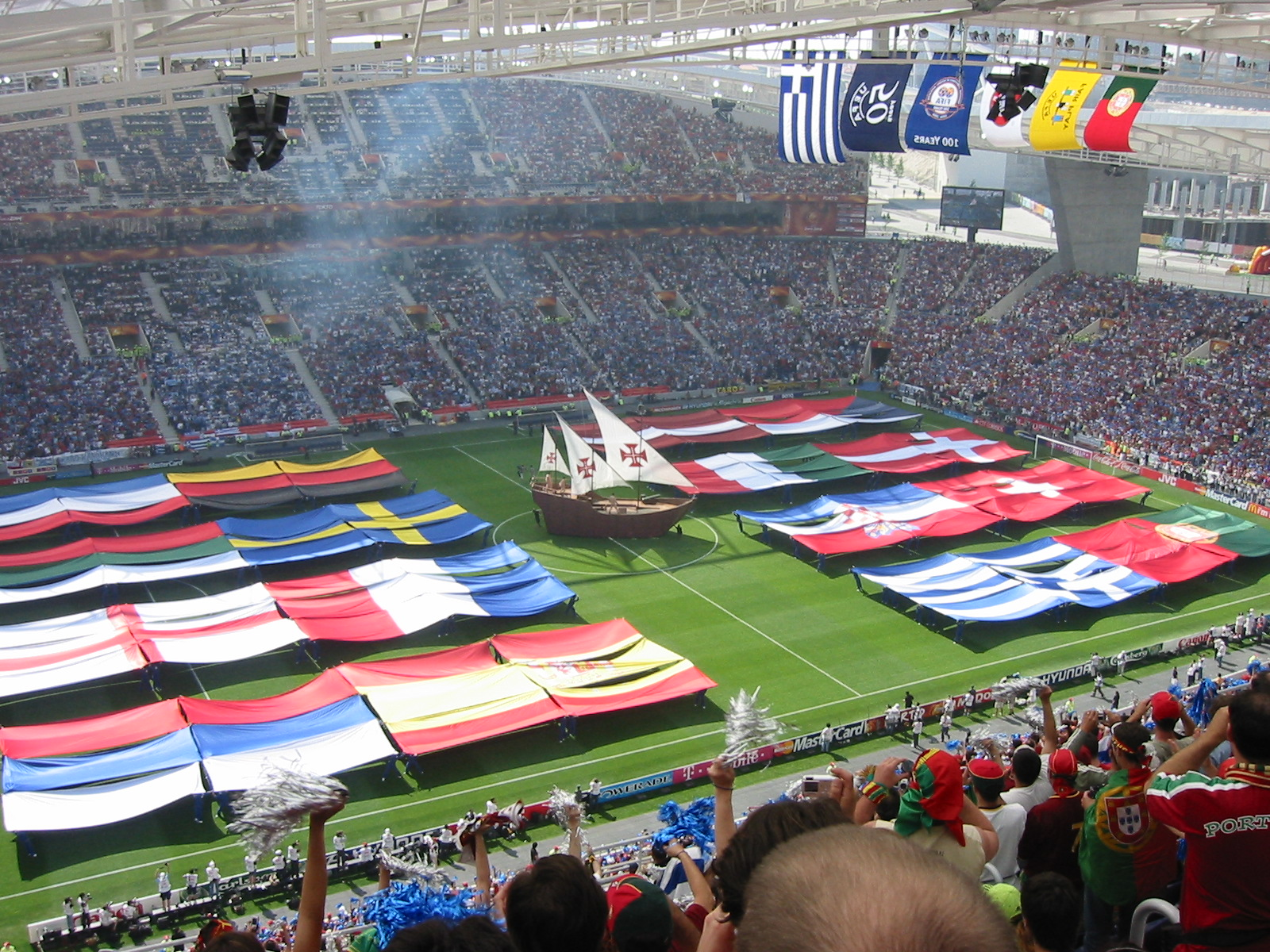
Opening ceremony at the Estádio do Dragão in Porto

In Group B, defending champions France scored twice in stoppage time to go from 1–0 down to beat England 2–1. Zinedine Zidane scored both goals; the second from the penalty spot. England's other two games were memorable for the performances of their young star Wayne Rooney. Only 18 at the time, Rooney's goal-scoring ability proved instrumental in victories over Switzerland (3–0) and Croatia (4–2). France and England qualified from the group as winners and runners-up respectively.

Group C featured a three-way tie between Sweden, Denmark and Italy. All matches between the three sides had ended in draws and all three had beaten Bulgaria. Italy were ultimately eliminated on the number of goals scored after Sweden and Denmark drew 2–2 and qualified as group winners and runners-up. The Italians accused Sweden and Denmark of fixing their match, as both sides knew that a 2–2 result would advance them both over Italy, but UEFA dismissed the complaint.

The Czech Republic, a golden generation team at the time, won Group D as the only team to win all three of their group matches. They defeated Latvia 2–1, the Netherlands 3–2, and Germany 2–1. It was another disappointing European campaign for the Germans, who failed to advance from the group stage for the second consecutive time. The Netherlands claimed a quarter-final berth as runners-up.

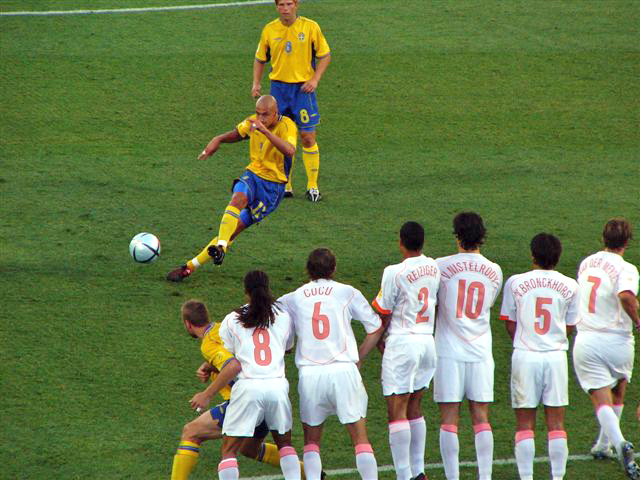
Swedish striker Henrik Larsson taking a free kick against the Netherlands in the quarter-finals

In the first quarter-final between England and Portugal, the English opened the score after only two minutes through Michael Owen. Portugal's constant attacking pressure from then on resulted in Hélder Postiga's 83rd-minute equaliser. In the dying minutes, Owen hit the Portuguese crossbar and Sol Campbell headed in the rebound, but the goal was ruled out by referee Urs Meier for a foul on the Portuguese goalkeeper Ricardo. The sides exchanged goals in extra-time, sending the match to a penalty shoot-out. Portugal won 6–5, as Ricardo saved from Darius Vassell and then scored the winning goal himself.

The Greeks, meanwhile, continued to stun everybody. Firm defensive play and an Angelos Charisteas goal on 65 minutes helped Greece defeat France 1–0 and progress to the semi-finals. This victory made Greece the first team to defeat both the hosts and defending champions in the same tournament. Sweden and the Netherlands played out an exciting but goalless encounter, even after a dramatic period of extra-time in which Freddie Ljungberg hit the inside of the Dutch goalpost. The Dutch progressed after winning the penalty shoot-out 5–4, their first victory on penalties in a major tournament. The last quarter-final match saw the Czechs dispatch Denmark, as a two-goal effort from Milan Baroš helped seal a 3–0 win.

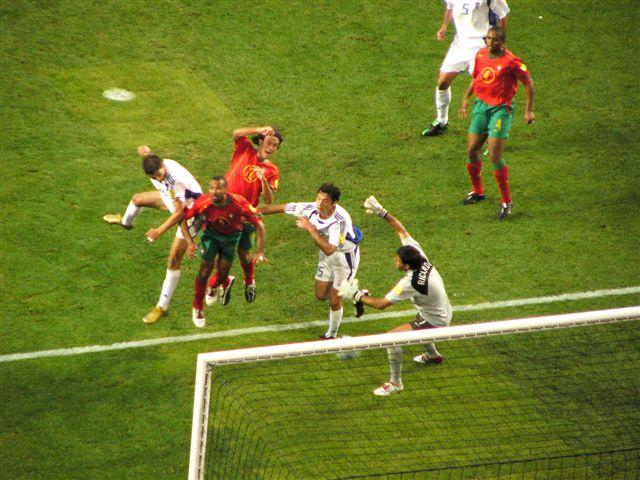
Angelos Charisteas (first from left with white shirt), scoring Greece's winner against Portugal in the final.

Portugal and the Netherlands faced each other in the first semi-final. Cristiano Ronaldo put the hosts in the lead from a corner kick midway through the first half, and just before the hour mark Maniche made it 2–0 with a spectacular goal from the corner of the penalty area. An own goal from Jorge Andrade gave the Netherlands a glimmer of hope. The game ended 2–1 to Portugal and the hosts, after their opening day failure, were through to the final of the European Championship for the first time. The Czech Republic looked likely candidates to face the hosts in the final. They were favourites to take the trophy, having won all four of their games. However, they would have to see off the upstart Greeks to do so. The Czechs had several chances, including a shot from Tomáš Rosický during the opening two minutes that struck the bar. The game remained goalless until the dying moments of the first half of extra time, when Traianos Dellas headed home the winner, the first and only silver goal in a European Championship.

The final was a repeat of the opening game of the tournament and Portugal were hoping to avenge their defeat. Portugal attacked and dominated possession but once again, sturdy defending and goalkeeping from Greece kept the hosts off the scoreboard. Just before the hour mark, Greece earned a corner kick from which Angelos Charisteas scored. Portugal continued to press after the goal but even with five minutes of stoppage time, they could not find an equaliser. Greece won the match 1–0 and were crowned European champions, a title that they were given odds as long as 150–1 of winning before the tournament. All of Greece's wins in the knockout stage came in an identical manner: a 1–0 win, with the goal being a header off a cross from the right wing. Portugal became the first host nation to lose in a European Championship final.

== Qualification ==
The draw for the qualifying round was held on 25 January 2002 at the Europarque Congress Centre, in Santa Maria da Feira, Portugal. Fifty teams were divided into ten groups of five and each team played two matches against all its opponents, on a home-and-away basis. Qualification matches took place from September 2002 to November 2003. The first-placed teams from each group qualified automatically to the final tournament, whereas the ten runners-up took part in a two-legged play-off to select the remaining five teams that would join the host nation in the final tournament.

=== Qualified teams ===
Ten of the sixteen finalists participated in the previous tournament in 2000. Latvia made its first appearance in a major football competition, while Greece returned to the European Championship finals after a 24-year absence. Bulgaria, Croatia, Russia and Switzerland also took part in their second tournament finals since their debut in 1996.

As of 2024, this was the last time that Bulgaria qualified for either the World Cup or European Championship finals, the only time that Latvia qualified, as well as the last time that Poland failed to qualify.

Team	Qualified as	Qualified on	Previous appearances in tournament (Note: Bold indicates champion for that year. Italic indicates host for that year.)
Portugal	Host	12 October 1999	3 (1984, 1996, 2000)
France	Group 1 winner	10 September 2003	5 (1960, **1984**, 1992, 1996, **2000**)
Czech Republic (Note: From 1960 to 1980, the Czech Republic competed as Czechoslovakia.)	Group 3 winner	10 September 2003	5 (1960, **1976**, 1980, 1996, 2000)
Sweden	Group 4 winner	10 September 2003	2 (1992, 2000)
Bulgaria	Group 8 winner	10 September 2003	1 (1996)
Denmark	Group 2 winner	11 October 2003	6 (1964, 1984, 1988, **1992**, 1996, 2000)
Germany (Note: From 1972 to 1988, Germany competed as West Germany.)	Group 5 winner	11 October 2003	8 (**1972**, 1976, **1980**, 1984, 1988, 1992, **1996**, 2000)
Greece	Group 6 winner	11 October 2003	1 (1980)
England	Group 7 winner	11 October 2003	6 (1968, 1980, 1988, 1992, 1996, 2000)
Italy	Group 9 winner	11 October 2003	5 (**1968**, 1980, 1988, 1996, 2000)
Switzerland	Group 10 winner	11 October 2003	1 (1996)
Croatia	Play-off winner	19 November 2003	1 (1996)
Latvia	Play-off winner	19 November 2003	0 (debut)
Netherlands	Play-off winner	19 November 2003	6 (1976, 1980, **1988**, 1992, 1996, 2000)
Spain	Play-off winner	19 November 2003	6 (**1964**, 1980, 1984, 1988, 1996, 2000)
Russia (Note: From 1960 to 1988, Russia competed as the Soviet Union, and in 1992 as CIS.)	Play-off winner	19 November 2003	7 (**1960**, 1964, 1968, 1972, 1988, 1992, 1996)

=== Final draw ===
- The group stage draw took place on 30 November 2003 at the Pavilhão Atlântico in Lisbon, Portugal, and was televised live: Euro 2004 Draw on BBC Sport.

The 16 qualified finalists were drawn from four seeded pots into four groups. The pot allocations were based on the 2003-edition of the UEFA national team coefficient ranking, which measured performance of teams in the 2002 FIFA World Cup qualifying and UEFA Euro 2004 qualifying. The coefficient was calculated by dividing the number of all points scored (three points for a win, one for a draw) by the number of all matches played. Results from the final tournaments, play-off matches and friendly games were all ignored. As host country, Portugal were automatically placed in position A1, and would hereby play the opening match of the final tournament. The remaining 15 teams were split into four pots, with title-holders France seeded alongside Sweden and the Czech Republic in the first pot.

Pot 1 (Note: Hosts Portugal (coefficient 2.400; rank 2nd) belonged to Pot 1 irrespective of their ranking position. Ahead of the draw, they were automatically assigned to group position A1, and consequently removed from pot 1.)
Team	Coeff	Rank
France (holders) (Note: Defending champions France (coefficient 3.000; rank 1st) were automatically assigned to Pot 1 irrespective of their ranking position, and could be drawn into either Group B, C or D.)	3.000	1
Sweden	2.389	3
Czech Republic	2.333	4

Pot 2
Team	Coeff	Rank
Italy	2.313	5
Spain	2.313	6
England	2.313	7
Germany	2.188	9

Pot 3
Team	Coeff	Rank
Netherlands	2.167	10
Croatia	2.125	11
Russia	2.056	13
Denmark	2.056	14

Pot 4
Team	Coeff	Rank
Bulgaria	1.889	18
Switzerland	1.611	22
Greece	1.563	23
Latvia	1.250	32

Automatically selected as a top-seeded team into pot 1, irrespective of their ranking position.

The Pot 1 teams were assigned to the first positions of their groups. For the purpose of determining the exact match schedules in each group, the 2nd/3rd/4th group positions were drawn separately for all other teams drawn from pot 2-4. The draw started by using pot 4 to draw one team to each of the four groups in alphabetic order from A to D. This same procedure was followed for pot 3 and pot 2. Finally the three remaining teams from pot 1 were drawn in alphabetic order into group B, C and D.

The draw resulted in the following groups:

Group A Team Portugal Greece Spain Russia	Group B Team France England Switzerland Croatia	Group C Team Sweden Bulgaria Denmark Italy	Group D Team Czech Republic Latvia Germany Netherlands

== Venues ==
The final tournament was played in ten venues located in eight different cities. Lisbon and Porto, the two biggest cities, had two venues each, while Aveiro, Braga, Coimbra, Faro-Loulé, Guimarães and Leiria had one venue. Initially, venues in additional locations such as Madeira and Porto Santo, plus Vila Real and Viseu were also being considered before the final ten stadiums were agreed upon.

In order to meet UEFA's requirements on venue capacity and infrastructure, six new stadiums were built – Estádio Municipal de Aveiro (Aveiro), Estádio Municipal de Braga (Braga), Estádio Algarve (Faro-Loulé), Estádio da Luz (Lisbon), Estádio José Alvalade (Lisbon) and Estádio do Dragão (Porto) – and four underwent renovation works – Estádio Cidade de Coimbra (Coimbra), Estádio D. Afonso Henriques (Guimarães), Estádio do Bessa (Porto) and Estádio Dr. Magalhães Pessoa (Leiria). The Estádio da Luz was the largest stadium with a tournament capacity of 64,642 seats, and served as the venue for the final. The opening ceremony and match took place at the Estádio do Dragão.

This was the first European Championship where matches took place in more than eight venues since the tournament was expanded to 16 teams in 1996.

The table below lists stadium capacity for the final tournament, which may not correspond to their effective maximum capacity.

UEFA Euro 2004 is located in Portugal	Lisbon		Aveiro
UEFA Euro 2004 is located in Portugal	Estádio da Luz	Estádio José Alvalade	Estádio Municipal de Aveiro
UEFA Euro 2004 is located in Portugal	Capacity: 65,647	Capacity: 50,095	Capacity: 32,830
UEFA Euro 2004 is located in Portugal	Porto		Faro/Loulé
UEFA Euro 2004 is located in Portugal	Estádio do Dragão	Estádio do Bessa	Estádio Algarve
UEFA Euro 2004 is located in Portugal	Capacity: 50,033	Capacity: 28,263	Capacity: 30,305
Braga	Guimarães	Coimbra	Leiria
Estádio Municipal de Braga	Estádio D. Afonso Henriques	Estádio Cidade de Coimbra	Estádio Dr. Magalhães Pessoa
Capacity: 30,286	Capacity: 30,029	Capacity: 29,744	Capacity: 29,366

=== Ticketing ===
A total of 1.2 million tickets were available for the 31 matches of the final tournament, of which 77% were to be sold to the general public, and the remainder reserved for sponsors and partners (13%), media (5%), and corporate hospitality (5%). Public sales for an initial batch of 450,000 tickets (38%) were launched on 28 April 2003, in a ceremony in Lisbon which gathered former European football stars Eusébio and Ruud Gullit. Ticket prices were divided in three categories, ranging from €35 (group matches) to €270 (final).

In a first phase lasting until 16 June 2003, supporters could apply for tickets via UEFA's tournament website or through forms available at the Portuguese Football Federation and match venues. Applicants could request a maximum of four tickets per match but were limited to one match per day. In parallel to individual match tickets, UEFA created a new category of tickets called "Follow My Team", which allowed supporters to see all the matches of their favourite team (group stage and, if qualified, knockout stage matches). If there were oversubscribed matches by the end of the first phase of sales, a match-specific draw would take place to select the successful applicants.

Between 1 August and 24 November 2003, available tickets were placed again on sale in a first-come, first-served basis. After the draw for the group stage on 30 November, a third phase of public sales began on 9 December, which included a second batch of tickets (39%) that could be bought until March 2004 through the national associations of the finalist teams. Every national association was awarded 20% of the venue capacity for each of their team's matches. From 1 to 30 April 2004, surplus tickets from UEFA or national associations were made available to the public for the last time. Ticket distribution began in May, after sales were officially closed.

=== Team base camps ===
Each team was provided a base camp for residence and daily training between tournament matches. An initial list of 25 bases approved by the Portuguese Football Federation, following a selection process started in November 2001, was announced by the organisation on 5 February 2003.

Team	Base camp
Bulgaria	Póvoa de Varzim
Croatia	Coruche
Czech Republic	Sintra
Denmark	Portimão
England	Oeiras
France	Santo Tirso
Germany	Almancil
Greece	Vila do Conde
Italy	Lisbon
Latvia	Anadia
Netherlands	Albufeira
Portugal	Alcochete
Russia	Vilamoura
Spain	Braga
Sweden	Estoril
Switzerland	Óbidos

== Squads ==
Each national team had to submit a squad of 23 players, three of whom must be goalkeepers, at least ten days before the opening match of the tournament. If a player became injured or ill severely enough to prevent his participation in the tournament before his team's first match, he would be replaced by another player.

== Match officials ==
On 4 December 2003, UEFA revealed the twelve referees and four fourth officials. Each refereeing team was composed by one main referee and two assistant referees from the same country. In April 2004, the UEFA Referees Committee replaced Russian assistant referee Gennady Krasyuk with Yuri Dupanov of Belarus. The switch was made after Krasyuk incorrectly disallowed a second goal from Paul Scholes for offside in the Champions League round of 16 second leg between Manchester United and Porto.

Country	Referee	Assistant referees	Matches refereed
Denmark	Kim Milton Nielsen	Jens Larsen; Jørgen Jepsen	Croatia 2–2 France (group B); Netherlands 3–0 Latvia (group D)
England	Mike Riley	Philip Sharp; Glenn Turner	Sweden 5–0 Bulgaria (group C); Latvia 0–0 Germany (group D)
France	Gilles Veissière	Frédéric Arnault; Serge Vallin	Russia 2–1 Greece (group A); Czech Republic 2–1 Latvia (group D)
Germany	Markus Merk	Christian Schräer; Jan-Hendrik Salver	France 2–1 England (group B); Denmark 2–2 Sweden (group C); Portugal 0–1 Greece (Final)
Italy	Pierluigi Collina	Marco Ivaldi; Narciso Pisacreta	Portugal 1–2 Greece (group A); Croatia 2–4 England (group B); Greece 1–0 Czech Republic (semi-final)
Norway	Terje Hauge	Ole Hermann Borgan; Steinar Holvik	Russia 0–2 Portugal (group A); Germany 1–2 Czech Republic (group D)
Portugal	Lucílio Batista	José Cardinal; Paulo Januário	Switzerland 0–0 Croatia (group B); Bulgaria 0–2 Denmark (group C)
Russia	Valentin Ivanov	~~Gennady Krasyuk~~; Vladimir Eniutin (Belarus) Yuri Dupanov	England 3–0 Switzerland (group B); Italy 2–1 Bulgaria (group C); Czech Republic 3–0 Denmark (quarter-final)
Slovakia	Ľuboš Micheľ	Igor Šramka; Martin Balko	Greece 1–1 Spain (group A); Switzerland 1–3 France (group B); Sweden 0–0 Netherlands (quarter-final)
Spain	Manuel Mejuto González	Oscar Martínez Samaniego; Rafael Guerrero Alonso	Denmark 0–0 Italy (group C); Netherlands 2–3 Czech Republic (group D)
Sweden	Anders Frisk	Kenneth Petersson; Peter Ekström	Spain 0–1 Portugal (group A); Germany 1–1 Netherlands (group D); France 0–1 Greece (quarter-final); Portugal 2–1 Netherlands (semi-final)
Switzerland	Urs Meier	Francesco Buragina; Rudolf Käppeli	Spain 1–0 Russia (group A); Italy 1–1 Sweden (group C); Portugal 2–2 England (quarter-final)

Country	Fourth official
Belgium	Frank De Bleeckere
Greece	Kyros Vassaras
Luxembourg	Alain Hamer
Scotland	Stuart Dougal

== Group stage ==
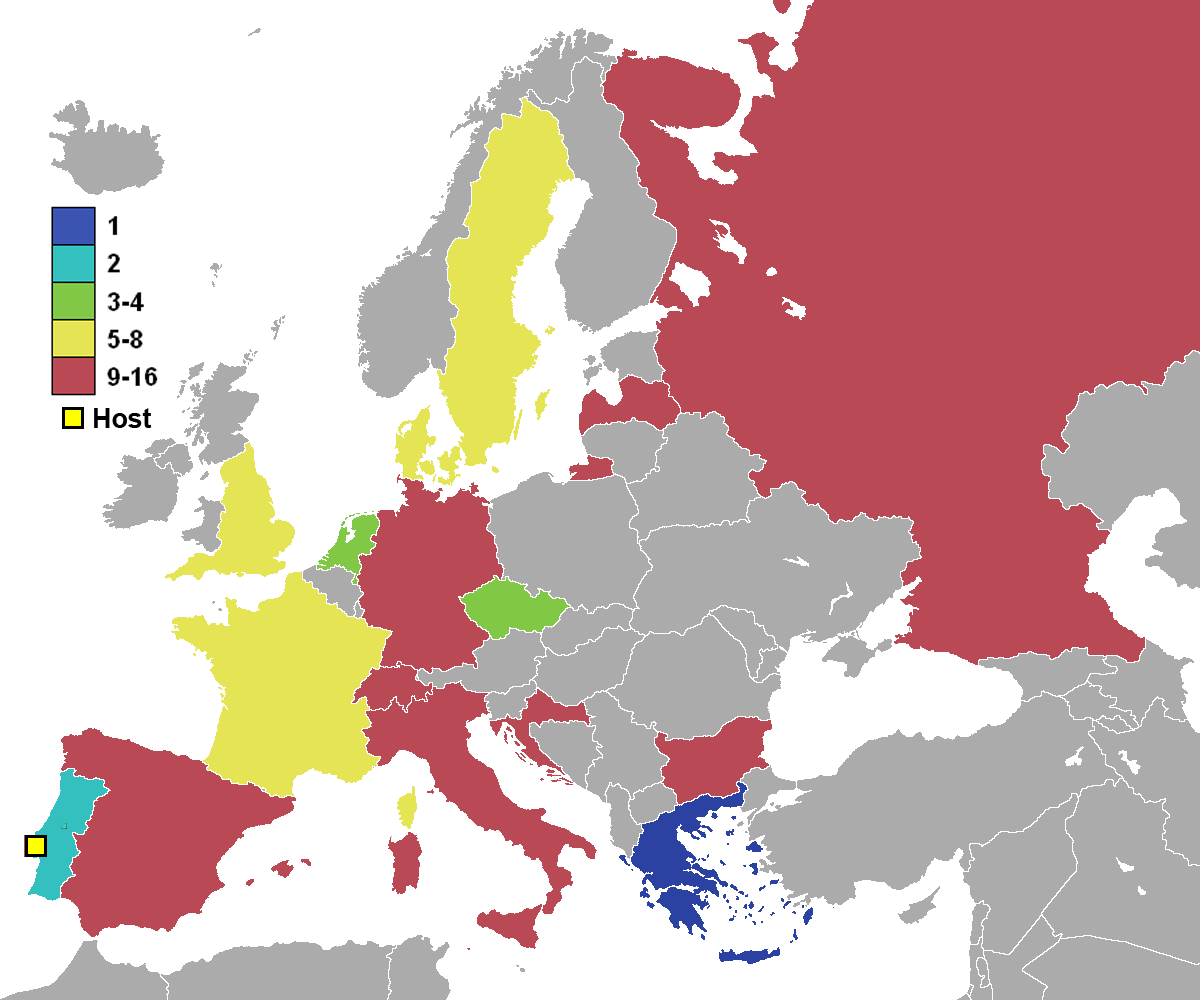
UEFA Euro 2004 finalists and their result

UEFA announced the match schedule for the final tournament on 10 March 2003, in Porto, Portugal. In a change from the previous tournament schedule, where two quarter-final matches were played per day, over two days, the quarter-finals at the Euro 2004 were to be played over four consecutive days, with one match per day.

All times are local, WEST (UTC+1).

=== Tiebreakers ===
If two or more teams were equal on points on completion of the group matches, the following tie-breaking criteria were applied:

1. Higher number of points obtained in the matches played between the teams in question;
2. Superior goal difference resulting from the matches played between the teams in question;
3. Higher number of goals scored in the matches played between the teams in question;
4. Superior goal difference in all group matches;
5. Higher number of goals scored in all group matches;
6. Higher coefficient derived from 2002 FIFA World Cup qualifying and UEFA Euro 2004 qualifying (points obtained divided by number of matches played);
7. Fair play conduct of the team in the final tournament;
8. Drawing of lots.

Euro 2004 marked the introduction of the penalty shootout as a tiebreaker between two teams in the last round of the group stage, but only if two teams tied on points, goals scored, and conceded played against each other in their final group match and no other team in the group finishes with the same number of points. In the end, no match required the use of this procedure. The same procedure was used in future European Championships tournaments.

=== Group A ===
Pos	Team	Pld	W	D	L	GF	GA	GD	Pts	Qualification
1	Portugal (H)	3	2	0	1	4	2	+2	6	Advance to knockout stage
2	Greece	3	1	1	1	4	4	0	4 (Note: Tied on head-to-head result (Greece 1–1 Spain) and overall goal difference (0). Overall goals for was used as the tiebreaker.)	Advance to knockout stage
3	Spain	3	1	1	1	2	2	0	4	
4	Russia	3	1	0	2	2	4	−2	3	

Source: UEFA
(H) Hosts
Notes:
12 June 2004
17:00

Portugal	1–2	Greece
Ronaldo 90+3'	Report	Karagounis 7'; Basinas 51' (pen.)

Estádio do Dragão, Porto
Attendance: 48,761
Referee: Pierluigi Collina (Italy)
12 June 2004
19:45

Spain	1–0	Russia
Valerón 60'	Report

Estádio Algarve, Faro/Loulé
Attendance: 28,182
Referee: Urs Meier (Switzerland)

16 June 2004
17:00

Greece	1–1	Spain
Charisteas 66'	Report	Morientes 28'

Estádio do Bessa, Porto
Attendance: 25,444
Referee: Ľuboš Micheľ (Slovakia)
16 June 2004
19:45

Russia	0–2	Portugal
	Report	Maniche 7'; Rui Costa 89'

Estádio da Luz, Lisbon
Attendance: 59,273
Referee: Terje Hauge (Norway)

20 June 2004
19:45

Spain	0–1	Portugal
	Report	Nuno Gomes 57'

Estádio José Alvalade, Lisbon
Attendance: 47,491
Referee: Anders Frisk (Sweden)
20 June 2004
19:45

Russia	2–1	Greece
Kirichenko 2'; Bulykin 17'	Report	Vryzas 43'

Estádio Algarve, Faro/Loulé
Attendance: 24,347
Referee: Gilles Veissière (France)

=== Group B ===
Pos	Team	Pld	W	D	L	GF	GA	GD	Pts	Qualification
1	France	3	2	1	0	7	4	+3	7	Advance to knockout stage
2	England	3	2	0	1	8	4	+4	6	Advance to knockout stage
3	Croatia	3	0	2	1	4	6	−2	2	
4	Switzerland	3	0	1	2	1	6	−5	1	

Source: UEFA
13 June 2004
17:00

Switzerland	0–0	Croatia
	Report

Estádio Dr. Magalhães Pessoa, Leiria
Attendance: 24,090
Referee: Lucílio Batista (Portugal)
13 June 2004
19:45

France	2–1	England
Zidane 90+1', 90+3' (pen.)	Report	Lampard 38'

Estádio da Luz, Lisbon
Attendance: 62,487
Referee: Markus Merk (Germany)

17 June 2004
17:00

England	3–0	Switzerland
Rooney 23', 75'; Gerrard 82'	Report

Estádio Cidade de Coimbra, Coimbra
Attendance: 28,214
Referee: Valentin Ivanov (Russia)
17 June 2004
19:45

Croatia	2–2	France
Rapaić 48' (pen.); Pršo 52'	Report	Tudor 22' (o.g.); Trezeguet 64'

Estádio Dr. Magalhães Pessoa, Leiria
Attendance: 29,160
Referee: Kim Milton Nielsen (Denmark)

21 June 2004
19:45

Croatia	2–4	England
N. Kovač 5'; Tudor 73'	Report	Scholes 40'; Rooney 45+1', 68'; Lampard 79'

Estádio da Luz, Lisbon
Attendance: 57,047
Referee: Pierluigi Collina (Italy)
21 June 2004
19:45

Switzerland	1–3	France
Vonlanthen 26'	Report	Zidane 20'; Henry 76', 84'

Estádio Cidade de Coimbra, Coimbra
Attendance: 28,111
Referee: Ľuboš Micheľ (Slovakia)

=== Group C ===
Pos	Team	Pld	W	D	L	GF	GA	GD	Pts	Qualification
1	Sweden	3	1	2	0	8	3	+5	5 (Note: Tied on head-to-head points (2) and goal difference (0). Head-to-head goals for: Sweden 3, Denmark 2, Italy 1.)	Advance to knockout stage
2	Denmark	3	1	2	0	4	2	+2	5	Advance to knockout stage
3	Italy	3	1	2	0	3	2	+1	5	
4	Bulgaria	3	0	0	3	1	9	−8	0	

Source: UEFA
Notes:
14 June 2004
17:00

Denmark	0–0	Italy
	Report

Estádio D. Afonso Henriques, Guimarães
Attendance: 29,595
Referee: Manuel Mejuto González (Spain)
14 June 2004
19:45

Sweden	5–0	Bulgaria
Ljungberg 32'; Larsson 57', 58'; Ibrahimović 78' (pen.); Allbäck 90+1'	Report

Estádio José Alvalade, Lisbon
Attendance: 31,652
Referee: Mike Riley (England)

18 June 2004
17:00

Bulgaria	0–2	Denmark
	Report	Tomasson 44'; Grønkjær 90+2'

Estádio Municipal de Braga, Braga
Attendance: 24,131
Referee: Lucílio Batista (Portugal)
18 June 2004
19:45

Italy	1–1	Sweden
Cassano 37'	Report	Ibrahimović 85'

Estádio do Dragão, Porto
Attendance: 44,926
Referee: Urs Meier (Switzerland)

22 June 2004
19:45

Italy	2–1	Bulgaria
Perrotta 48'; Cassano 90+4'	Report	M. Petrov 45' (pen.)

Estádio D. Afonso Henriques, Guimarães
Attendance: 16,002
Referee: Valentin Ivanov (Russia)
22 June 2004
19:45

Denmark	2–2	Sweden
Tomasson 28', 66'	Report	Larsson 47' (pen.); Jonson 89'

Estádio do Bessa, Porto
Attendance: 26,115
Referee: Markus Merk (Germany)

=== Group D ===
Pos	Team	Pld	W	D	L	GF	GA	GD	Pts	Qualification
1	Czech Republic	3	3	0	0	7	4	+3	9	Advance to knockout stage
2	Netherlands	3	1	1	1	6	4	+2	4	Advance to knockout stage
3	Germany	3	0	2	1	2	3	−1	2	
4	Latvia	3	0	1	2	1	5	−4	1	

Source: UEFA
15 June 2004
17:00

Czech Republic	2–1	Latvia
Baroš 73'; Heinz 85'	Report	Verpakovskis 45+1'

Estádio Municipal de Aveiro, Aveiro
Attendance: 21,744
Referee: Gilles Veissière (France)
15 June 2004
19:45

Germany	1–1	Netherlands
Frings 30'	Report	Van Nistelrooy 81'

Estádio do Dragão, Porto
Attendance: 48,197
Referee: Anders Frisk (Sweden)

19 June 2004
17:00

Latvia	0–0	Germany
	Report

Estádio do Bessa, Porto
Attendance: 22,344
Referee: Mike Riley (England)
19 June 2004
19:45

Netherlands	2–3	Czech Republic
Bouma 4'; Van Nistelrooy 19'	Report	Koller 23'; Baroš 71'; Šmicer 88'

Estádio Municipal de Aveiro, Aveiro
Attendance: 29,935
Referee: Manuel Mejuto González (Spain)

23 June 2004
19:45

Netherlands	3–0	Latvia
Van Nistelrooy 27' (pen.), 35'; Makaay 84'	Report

Estádio Municipal de Braga, Braga
Attendance: 27,904
Referee: Kim Milton Nielsen (Denmark)
23 June 2004
19:45

Germany	1–2	Czech Republic
Ballack 21'	Report	Heinz 30'; Baroš 77'

Estádio José Alvalade, Lisbon
Attendance: 46,849
Referee: Terje Hauge (Norway)

== Knockout stage ==
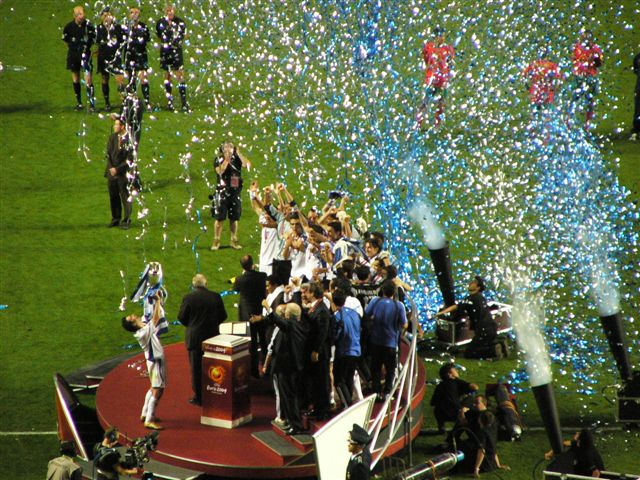
The Greece national team at the trophy ceremony.

The knockout stage was a single-elimination tournament involving the eight teams that advanced from the group stage. There were three rounds of matches, with each round eliminating half of the teams entering that round, culminating in the final to decide the champions. Any game in the knockout stage that was not decided by the end of the regular 90 minutes was followed by up to 30 minutes of extra time (two 15-minute halves).

For the first time in an international football tournament, the silver goal system was applied, whereby the team that led the game at the half-time break during the extra time period would be declared the winner. If the scores were still level after the initial 15 minutes of extra time, play would continue for a further 15 minutes. If the teams could still not be separated after the extra time, there would be a penalty shoot-out (at least five penalties each) to determine which team progressed to the next round. The silver goal replaced the golden goal from the previous two championships and was used in the semi-final between Greece and the Czech Republic.

As with every tournament since UEFA Euro 1984, there was no third place play-off.

All times are local, WEST (UTC+1).

=== Bracket ===
Quarter-finals
24 June – Lisbon (Luz)
Portugal (p)	2 (6)
England	2 (5)
26 June – Faro/Loulé
Sweden	0 (4)
Netherlands (p)	0 (5)
25 June – Lisbon (Alvalade)
France	0
Greece	1
27 June – Porto (Dragão)
Czech Republic	3
Denmark	0

Semi-finals
30 June – Lisbon (Alvalade)
Portugal	2
Netherlands	1
1 July – Porto (Dragão)
Greece (s.g.)	1
Czech Republic	0

Final
4 July – Lisbon (Luz)
Portugal	0
Greece	1

=== Quarter-finals ===
24 June 2004
19:45

Portugal	2–2 (a.e.t.)	England
Postiga 83'; Rui Costa 110'	Report	Owen 3'; Lampard 115'
Penalties
Deco (penalty scored); Simão (penalty scored); Rui Costa (penalty missed); Ronaldo (penalty scored); Maniche (penalty scored); Postiga (penalty scored); Ricardo (penalty scored)	6–5	(penalty missed) Beckham; (penalty scored) Owen; (penalty scored) Lampard; (penalty scored) Terry; (penalty scored) Hargreaves; (penalty scored) A. Cole; (penalty missed) Vassell

Estádio da Luz, Lisbon
Attendance: 62,564
Referee: Urs Meier (Switzerland)

25 June 2004
19:45

France	0–1	Greece
	Report	Charisteas 65'

Estádio José Alvalade, Lisbon
Attendance: 45,390
Referee: Anders Frisk (Sweden)

26 June 2004
19:45

Sweden	0–0 (a.e.t.)	Netherlands
	Report
Penalties
Källström (penalty scored); Larsson (penalty scored); Ibrahimović (penalty missed); Ljungberg (penalty scored); Wilhelmsson (penalty scored); Mellberg (penalty missed)	4–5	(penalty scored) Van Nistelrooy; (penalty scored) Heitinga; (penalty scored) Reiziger; (penalty missed) Cocu; (penalty scored) Makaay; (penalty scored) Robben

Estádio Algarve, Faro/Loulé
Attendance: 27,762
Referee: Ľuboš Micheľ (Slovakia)

27 June 2004
19:45

Czech Republic	3–0	Denmark
Koller 49'; Baroš 63', 65'	Report

Estádio do Dragão, Porto
Attendance: 41,092
Referee: Valentin Ivanov (Russia)

=== Semi-finals ===
30 June 2004
19:45

Portugal	2–1	Netherlands
Ronaldo 26'; Maniche 58'	Report	Andrade 63' (o.g.)

Estádio José Alvalade, Lisbon
Attendance: 46,679
Referee: Anders Frisk (Sweden)

1 July 2004
19:45

Greece	1–0 (a.e.t./s.g.)	Czech Republic
Dellas 105+1'	Report

Estádio do Dragão, Porto
Attendance: 42,449
Referee: Pierluigi Collina (Italy)

=== Final ===
4 July 2004
19:45

Portugal	0–1	Greece
	Report	Charisteas 57'

Estádio da Luz, Lisbon
Attendance: 62,865
Referee: Markus Merk (Germany)

== Statistics ==
=== Goalscorers ===
There were 77 goals scored in 31 matches, for an average of 2.48 goals per match.

5 goals

- (Czech Republic) Milan Baroš

4 goals

- (England) Wayne Rooney
- (Netherlands) Ruud van Nistelrooy

3 goals

- (Denmark) Jon Dahl Tomasson
- (England) Frank Lampard
- (France) Zinedine Zidane
- (Greece) Angelos Charisteas
- (Sweden) Henrik Larsson

2 goals

- (Czech Republic) Marek Heinz
- (Czech Republic) Jan Koller
- (France) Thierry Henry
- (Italy) Antonio Cassano
- (Portugal) Rui Costa
- (Portugal) Maniche
- (Portugal) Cristiano Ronaldo
- (Sweden) Zlatan Ibrahimović

1 goal

- (Bulgaria) Martin Petrov
- (Croatia) Niko Kovač
- (Croatia) Dado Pršo
- (Croatia) Milan Rapaić
- (Croatia) Igor Tudor
- (Czech Republic) Vladimír Šmicer
- (Denmark) Jesper Grønkjær
- (England) Steven Gerrard
- (England) Michael Owen
- (England) Paul Scholes
- (France) David Trezeguet
- (Germany) Michael Ballack
- (Germany) Torsten Frings
- (Greece) Angelos Basinas
- (Greece) Traianos Dellas
- (Greece) Giorgos Karagounis
- (Greece) Zisis Vryzas
- (Italy) Simone Perrotta
- (Latvia) Māris Verpakovskis
- (Netherlands) Wilfred Bouma
- (Netherlands) Roy Makaay
- (Portugal) Nuno Gomes
- (Portugal) Hélder Postiga
- (Russia) Dmitri Bulykin
- (Russia) Dmitri Kirichenko
- (Spain) Fernando Morientes
- (Spain) Juan Carlos Valerón
- (Sweden) Marcus Allbäck
- (Sweden) Mattias Jonson
- (Sweden) Freddie Ljungberg
- (Switzerland) Johan Vonlanthen

1 own goal

- (Croatia) Igor Tudor (against France)
- (Portugal) Jorge Andrade (against Netherlands)

Source: UEFA

=== Awards ===
UEFA Team of the Tournament

The UEFA Technical Team was charged with naming a squad composed of the 23 best players over the course of the tournament. The group of eight analysts watched every game at the tournament before making their decision after the final. Five players from the winning Greek team were named to the team of the tournament. Michael Ballack and Gianluca Zambrotta were the only players to be included whose teams were knocked out in the group stage.

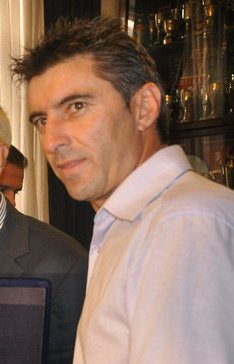
Theodoros Zagorakis, UEFA Player of the Tournament

Goalkeepers	Defenders	Midfielders	Forwards
(Czech Republic) Petr Čech (Greece) Antonios Nikopolidis	(England) Sol Campbell (England) Ashley Cole (Greece) Traianos Dellas (Greece) Giourkas Seitaridis (Italy) Gianluca Zambrotta (Portugal) Ricardo Carvalho (Sweden) Olof Mellberg	(Czech Republic) Pavel Nedvěd (England) Frank Lampard (France) Zinedine Zidane (Germany) Michael Ballack (Greece) Theodoros Zagorakis (Portugal) Luís Figo (Portugal) Maniche	(Czech Republic) Milan Baroš (Denmark) Jon Dahl Tomasson (England) Wayne Rooney (Greece) Angelos Charisteas (Netherlands) Ruud van Nistelrooy (Portugal) Cristiano Ronaldo (Sweden) Henrik Larsson

Golden Boot

The Golden Boot was awarded to Milan Baroš, who scored all five of his goals in three group stage matches and in the quarter-finals against Denmark.

- (Czech Republic) Milan Baroš (5 goals)

UEFA Player of the Tournament

- (Greece) Theodoros Zagorakis

=== Prize money ===
Overall, CHF200 million was awarded to the 16 teams, a boost from the CHF120 million in the previous event. Below is a complete list of the allocations:

- Prize for participating: CHF7.5 million

Extra payment based on teams performance:

- Winner: CHF10 million
- Runner-up: CHF6 million
- Semi-finals: CHF4 million
- Quarter-finals: CHF3 million
- Group stage (per match):
  - Win: CHF1 million
  - Draw: CHF500,000

=== Discipline ===
If a player was shown a red card – whether as a result of two bookable offences or a straight red – he would become suspended from playing in his team's next match. A player would also become suspended for one match for picking up two yellow cards in separate matches. However, any yellow cards accumulated would be cancelled once a team was eliminated from the tournament or reached the semi-finals. In extreme cases of ill-discipline, UEFA could choose to have a disciplinary panel examine the incident in order to determine whether or not further suspension would be required.

The following players were suspended for one or more games as a result of red cards or yellow card accumulation:

Player	Offence(s)	Suspension(s)
(Russia) Roman Sharonov	(yellow card) (yellow-red card) in Group A vs Spain (matchday 1; 12 June)	Group A vs Portugal (matchday 2; 16 June)
(Switzerland) Johann Vogel	(yellow card) (yellow-red card) in Group B vs Croatia (matchday 1; 13 June)	Group B vs England (matchday 2; 17 June)
(Italy) Francesco Totti	Spat on Christian Poulsen in Group C vs Denmark (matchday 1; 14 June)	Group C vs Sweden (matchday 2; 18 June); Group C vs Bulgaria (matchday 3; 22 June); World Cup qualifying vs Norway
(Spain) Carlos Marchena	(yellow card) in Group A vs Russia (matchday 1; 12 June); (yellow card) in Group A vs Greece (matchday 2; 16 June)	Group A vs Portugal (matchday 3; 20 June)
(Greece) Giorgos Karagounis	(yellow card) in Group A vs Portugal (matchday 1; 12 June); (yellow card) in Group A vs Spain (matchday 2; 16 June)	Group A vs Russia (matchday 3; 20 June)
(Russia) Alexey Smertin	(yellow card) in Group A vs Spain (matchday 1; 12 June); (yellow card) in Group A vs Portugal (matchday 2; 16 June)	Group A vs Greece (matchday 3; 20 June)
(Russia) Sergei Ovchinnikov	(red card) in Group A vs Portugal (matchday 2; 16 June)	Group A vs Greece (matchday 3; 20 June)
(Switzerland) Bernt Haas	(yellow card) (yellow-red card) in Group B vs England (matchday 2; 17 June)	Group B vs France (matchday 3; 21 June)
(Bulgaria) Rosen Kirilov	(yellow card) in Group C vs Sweden (matchday 1; 14 June); (yellow card) in Group C vs Denmark (matchday 2; 18 June)	Group C vs Italy (matchday 3; 22 June)
(Bulgaria) Stiliyan Petrov	(yellow card) (yellow-red card) in Group C vs Denmark (matchday 2; 18 June)	Group C vs Italy (matchday 3; 22 June)
(Italy) Gennaro Gattuso	(yellow card) in Group C vs Denmark (matchday 1; 14 June); (yellow card) in Group C vs Sweden (matchday 2; 18 June)	Group C vs Bulgaria (matchday 3; 22 June)
(Italy) Fabio Cannavaro	(yellow card) in Group C vs Denmark (matchday 1; 14 June); (yellow card) in Group C vs Sweden (matchday 2; 18 June)	Group C vs Bulgaria (matchday 3; 22 June)
(Sweden) Tobias Linderoth	(yellow card) in Group C vs Bulgaria (matchday 1; 14 June); (yellow card) in Group C vs Italy (matchday 2; 18 June)	Group C vs Denmark (matchday 3; 22 June)
(Netherlands) John Heitinga	(yellow card) (yellow-red card) in Group D vs Czech Republic (matchday 2; 19 June)	Group D vs Latvia (matchday 3; 23 June)
(Greece) Zisis Vryzas	(yellow card) in Group A vs Portugal (matchday 1; 12 June); (yellow card) in Group A vs Russia (matchday 3; 20 June)	Quarter-finals vs France (25 June)
(Sweden) Erik Edman	(yellow card) in Group C vs Italy (matchday 2; 18 June); (yellow card) in Group C vs Denmark (matchday 3; 22 June)	Quarter-finals vs Netherlands (26 June)
(Greece) Giorgos Karagounis	(yellow card) in Quarter-finals vs France (25 June); (yellow card) in Semi-finals vs Czech Republic (1 July)	Final vs Portugal (4 July)

== Marketing ==
=== Logo, mascot and official song ===
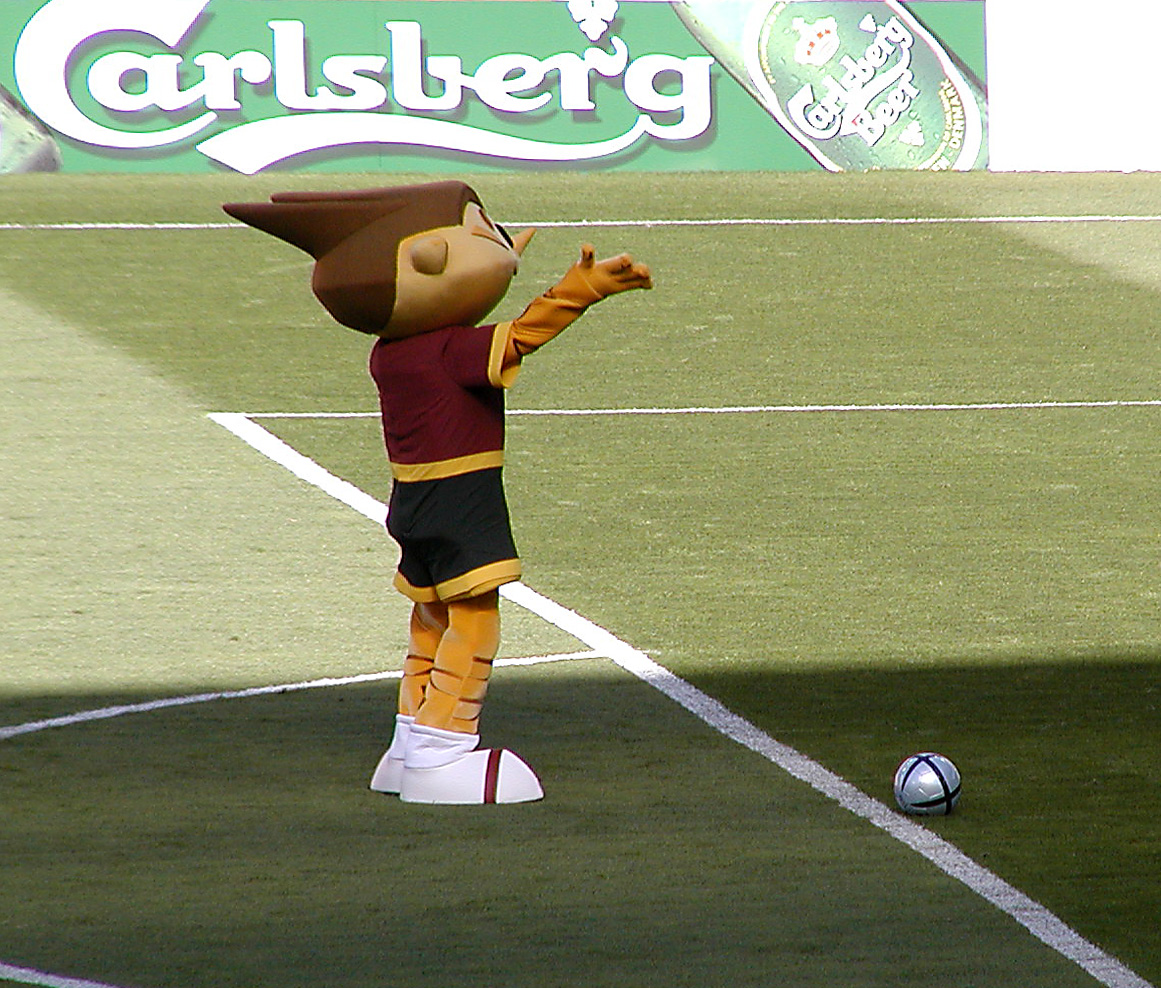
UEFA Euro 2004 mascot, Kinas

The official tournament logo was created by Euro RSCG Wnek Gosper agency and unveiled on 13 May 2002 at a ceremony held in Lisbon's Belém Cultural Center. It represents a football in the centre of a heart, surrounded by seven green dots. The football – displaying typical Portuguese folk artistic motifs on its panels – and the heart – shaped in the traditional style of the filigree art from Viana do Castelo – conveyed the football passion of the host country. The seven dots represent significant Portuguese elements and achievements, such as the number of castles in the national coat of arms or the conquest of the seven seas during the Age of Discoveries. The logo's colour palette was based on the Portuguese flag and its warm tones recall the light and sun associated with the Portuguese landscape and climate. The competition slogan used was "Vive O 2004!" (English: Live 2004!).

The official mascot was a boy named Kinas – derived from quinas (English: inescutcheons), one of the symbols of the Portuguese coat of arms – who wore a football kit with the Portuguese colours (red shirt and green shorts) and was constantly playing with a football. He possessed the knowledge and talent of generations of highly gifted football players, and embodied the energy and passion of football. Created by Warner Bros., Kinas was officially unveiled on 29 March 2003 at the Casa de Serralves, in Porto, Portugal.

The official song, called "Força" (English: Strength), was written and performed by Portuguese-Canadian singer Nelly Furtado. The song was taken from her second studio album, Folklore, and released as its third single, soon after the start of the tournament. Furtado was selected to sing the official song of the tournament, because of her familial connection to the host country (her parents are both Portuguese from the Azores). She wrote "Força" with "the passion the Portuguese people have for football" in mind. The song was played at every match, and performed live by Furtado at the closing ceremony prior to the final.

=== Match ball ===
The official match ball was presented during the final draw ceremony on 30 November 2003 in Lisbon. It was produced by Adidas and named Adidas Roteiro, after the logbook (Portuguese: roteiro) used by Portuguese maritime explorers such as Vasco da Gama. Roteiro was the first official tournament football to employ the new thermal-bonding technique in its production, which resulted in a seamless surface and a more homogeneous design. Portuguese Football Federation president Gilberto Madaíl praised the ball, stating: "Adidas has delivered a stunning, modern and state-of the-art Portuguese football. This is very much how we envisage the UEFA Euro 2004 event to be". Roteiro was also used at the 2004 AFC Asian Cup, and during the mid-season of the 2004–05 German Bundesliga.

The new ball received mixed reactions from players and technical staffs. England midfielder David Beckham, who was asked by Adidas to test it, was pleased with Roteiro's performance, particularly in free-kicks. France midfielder Zinedine Zidane believed the ball would "improve the game". Several Spanish players, however, regarded it as "horrible, difficult to control and to pass", with Real Madrid footballer Iván Helguera describing it as a "beach ball". Notable players of the Italy national team, such as Francesco Totti, Andrea Pirlo and goalkeeper Gianluigi Buffon also voiced criticisms.

=== Trophy tour ===
During the two months ahead of the tournament, the Henri Delaunay Trophy travelled across Portugal to promote the European Championship finals in the host country. The tour began on 8 April 2004 at the Praça do Comércio in Lisbon, where the launching ceremony took place with the presence of Portuguese football legend and tournament ambassador Eusébio. A total of twenty towns and cities were visited by the trophy tour caravan, including the ten that would host matches.

Trophy tour stops and dates

- Lisbon (8–11 April)
- Setúbal (10–14 April)
- Faro/Loulé (15–18 April)
- Beja (20–22 April)
- Évora (23–25 April)
- Portalegre (27–29 April)
- Santarém (30 April–2 May)
- Leiria (4–6 May)
- Castelo Branco (7–8 May)
- Coimbra (10–13 May)
- Aveiro (13–15 May)
- Guarda (16–17 May)
- Viseu (18–19 May)
- Bragança (21–23 May)
- Vila Real (24–25 May)
- Viana do Castelo (27–28 May)
- Guimarães (29 May – 1 June)
- Braga (2–4 June)
- Porto (6–11 June)

=== Merchandise and memorabilia ===
In November 2002, UEFA appointed Warner Bros. Consumer Products (WBCP) as the tournament's exclusive worldwide licensing agent. As the global licensing rights owner, WBCP was responsible for negotiating product licence contracts with third parties on the behalf of UEFA and delineate product sales strategies across the host country. Other tasks included setting up and managing marketing plans, product distribution and prices, and prevent illegal use of trademarks and product sales. Over 2,000 merchandise items were developed by the 28 licencees chosen by WBCP, and were distributed not only within Portugal but also in major European and Asian markets.

To celebrate Portugal's hosting of the Euro 2004 finals, commemorative coin and stamp collections were issued by the Imprensa Nacional-Casa da Moeda, the Portuguese national mint and printing house, and CTT, the national postal service.

=== Sponsorship ===
UEFA distinguishes between global sponsors and national sponsors. Global Euro sponsors can come from any country and have together exclusive worldwide sponsorship rights for a UEFA European Football Championship. National sponsors come from the host country and do only have sponsorship rights within that country. Eight sponsors were announced by UEFA in December 2002.

Global sponsors	National sponsors
Adidas; BenQ; Canon; Carlsberg; Coca-Cola; Hyundai; JVC; MasterCard; McDonald's; NTT/Verio; PT; T-Mobile	BPI; CTT; Galp Energia; Portucel Soporcel; Vista Alegre Atlantis Group

== Broadcasting ==
Nineteen cameras were used in each of the ten venues to broadcast the live matches, with three additional cameras in the opening and knockout stage matches.

== See also ==
- Vive O 2004!, the official album for UEFA Euro 2004
- UEFA Euro 2004, the official video game for UEFA Euro 2004
