= UEFA Euro 2008 statistics =

Football tournament statistics

These are the statistics for the Euro 2008 in Austria and Switzerland.

== Goalscorers ==
There were 77 goals scored in 31 matches, for an average of 2.48 goals per match.

4 goals

- (Spain) David Villa

3 goals

- (Germany) Lukas Podolski
- (Russia) Roman Pavlyuchenko
- (Switzerland) Hakan Yakin
- (Turkey) Semih Şentürk

2 goals

- (Croatia) Ivan Klasnić
- (Germany) Michael Ballack
- (Germany) Miroslav Klose
- (Germany) Bastian Schweinsteiger
- (Netherlands) Wesley Sneijder
- (Netherlands) Ruud van Nistelrooy
- (Netherlands) Robin van Persie
- (Russia) Andrey Arshavin
- (Spain) Dani Güiza
- (Spain) Fernando Torres
- (Sweden) Zlatan Ibrahimović
- (Turkey) Nihat Kahveci
- (Turkey) Arda Turan

1 goal

- (Austria) Ivica Vastić
- (Croatia) Luka Modrić
- (Croatia) Ivica Olić
- (Croatia) Darijo Srna
- (Czech Republic) Jan Koller
- (Czech Republic) Jaroslav Plašil
- (Czech Republic) Libor Sionko
- (Czech Republic) Václav Svěrkoš
- (France) Thierry Henry
- (Germany) Philipp Lahm
- (Greece) Angelos Charisteas
- (Italy) Daniele De Rossi
- (Italy) Christian Panucci
- (Italy) Andrea Pirlo
- (Netherlands) Klaas-Jan Huntelaar
- (Netherlands) Dirk Kuyt
- (Netherlands) Arjen Robben
- (Netherlands) Giovanni van Bronckhorst
- (Poland) Roger Guerreiro
- (Portugal) Deco
- (Portugal) Nuno Gomes
- (Portugal) Raul Meireles
- (Portugal) Pepe
- (Portugal) Hélder Postiga
- (Portugal) Ricardo Quaresma
- (Portugal) Cristiano Ronaldo
- (Romania) Adrian Mutu
- (Russia) Dmitri Torbinski
- (Russia) Konstantin Zyryanov
- (Spain) Rubén de la Red
- (Spain) Cesc Fàbregas
- (Spain) David Silva
- (Spain) Xavi
- (Sweden) Petter Hansson
- (Turkey) Uğur Boral

== Awards ==
UEFA Team of the Tournament

Goalkeepers	Defenders	Midfielders	Forwards
(Italy) Gianluigi Buffon (Netherlands) Edwin van der Sar (Spain) Iker Casillas	(Germany) Philipp Lahm (Portugal) José Bosingwa (Portugal) Pepe (Russia) Yuri Zhirkov (Spain) Carlos Marchena (Spain) Carles Puyol	(Croatia) Luka Modrić (Germany) Michael Ballack (Germany) Lukas Podolski (Netherlands) Wesley Sneijder (Russia) Konstantin Zyryanov (Spain) Cesc Fàbregas (Spain) Andrés Iniesta (Spain) Marcos Senna (Spain) Xavi (Turkey) Hamit Altıntop	(Russia) Andrey Arshavin (Russia) Roman Pavlyuchenko (Spain) Fernando Torres (Spain) David Villa

Golden Boot

- (Spain) David Villa (4 goals)

UEFA Player of the Tournament

- (Spain) Xavi

== Scoring ==
- Total number of goals scored: 77
- Average goals per match: 2.48
- Top scorer: David Villa (4 goals)
- Most goals scored by a team: 12 – Spain
- Fewest goals scored by a team: 1 – Romania, Austria, Poland, Greece, France
- Most goals conceded by a team: 9 – Turkey
- Fewest goals conceded by a team: 2 – Croatia
- First goal of the tournament: Václav Svěrkoš against Switzerland
- Last goal of the tournament: Fernando Torres against Germany
- Fastest goal in a match: 4 minutes: Luka Modrić against Austria
- Latest goal in a match with extra time: 120+2 minutes: Semih Şentürk against Croatia
- Latest goal in a match without extra time: 90+3 minutes: Raul Meireles against Turkey
- First hat-trick: David Villa against Russia
- Most goals scored by one player in a match: 3 – David Villa against Russia
- No own goals were scored during the tournament.

== Attendance ==
- Overall attendance: 1,140,90
- Average attendance per match: 36,308

== Wins and losses ==
- Most wins: 5 – Spain
- Fewest wins: 0 – Romania, Austria, Poland, France, Greece
- Most losses: 3 – Greece
- Fewest losses: 0 – Spain

== Discipline ==
Sanctions against foul play at UEFA Euro 2008 are in the first instance the responsibility of the referee, but when he deems it necessary to give a caution, or dismiss a player, UEFA keeps a record and may enforce a suspension. Referee decisions are generally seen as final. However, UEFA's disciplinary committee may additionally penalise players for offences unpunished by the referee.

=== Overview ===
==== Red cards ====
A player receiving a red card is automatically suspended for the next match. A longer suspension is possible if the UEFA disciplinary committee judges the offence as warranting it. In keeping with the FIFA Disciplinary Code (FDC) and UEFA Disciplinary Regulations (UDR), UEFA does not allow for appeals of red cards except in the case of mistaken identity. The FDC further stipulates that if a player is sent off during his team's final Euro 2008 match, the suspension carries over to his team's next competitive international(s). For Euro 2008 these would be the qualification matches for the 2010 FIFA World Cup.

Any player who was suspended due to a red card that was earned in Euro 2008 qualifying is required to serve the balance of any suspension unserved by the end of qualifying either in the Euro 2008 finals (for any player on a team that qualified, whether he is selected to the final squad or not) or in World Cup qualifying (for players on teams that did not qualify). This provision affected Russian captain Andrei Arshavin who missed his team's first two group matches after getting sent off in Russia's final Euro 2008 qualifier.

==== Yellow cards ====
Any player receiving a single yellow card during two of the three group stage matches plus the quarter-final match is suspended for the next match. A single yellow card does not carry over to the semi-finals. This means that no player will be suspended for final unless he gets sent off in semi-final or he is serving a longer suspension for an earlier incident. Suspensions due to yellow cards will not carry over to the World Cup qualifiers. Yellow cards and any related suspensions earned in the Euro 2008 qualifiers are neither counted nor enforced in the final tournament.

In the event a player is sent off for two bookable offences, only the red card is counted for disciplinary purposes. However, in the event a player receives a direct red card after being booked in the same match, then both cards are counted. If the player was already facing a suspension for two tournament bookings when he was sent off, this would result in separate suspensions that would be served consecutively. The one match ban for the yellow cards would be served first unless the player's team is eliminated in the match in which he was sent off. If the player's team is eliminated in the match in which he was serving his ban for the yellow cards, then the ban for the sending off would be carried over to the World Cup qualifiers.

==== Additional punishment ====
For serious transgressions, a longer suspension may be handed down at the discretion of the UEFA disciplinary committee. The disciplinary committee is also charged with reviewing any incidents that were missed by the officials and can award administrative red cards and suspensions accordingly. However, just as appeals of red cards are not considered, the disciplinary committee is also not allowed to review transgressions that were already punished by the referee with something less than a red card. For example, if a player is booked but not sent off for a dangerous tackle, the disciplinary committee cannot subsequently deem the challenge to be violent conduct and then upgrade the card to a red. However, if the same player then spits at the opponent but is still not sent off, then the referee's report would be unlikely to mention this automatic red card offence. Video evidence of the spitting incident could then be independently reviewed.

Unlike the rules in many domestic competitions, there is no particular category of red card offence that automatically results in a multi-game suspension. In general however, extended bans are only assessed for red cards given for serious foul play, violent conduct, spitting or perhaps foul and abusive language. Also, unlike many sets of domestic rules second and subsequent red cards also do not automatically incur an extended ban, although a player's past disciplinary record (including prior competition) might be considered by the disciplinary committee when punishing him. As a rule, only automatic red card offenses are considered for longer bans. A player who gets sent off for picking up two yellow cards in the same match will not have his automatic one-match ban extended by UEFA on account of what he did to get the second booking, because the referee has deemed him as not to have committed an automatic red card offense.

If UEFA suspends a player after his team's elimination from the tournament, or for more games than the team ends up playing without him prior to the final or their elimination (whichever comes first), then the remaining suspension must be served during World Cup qualifying. For a particularly grave offence UEFA has the power to impose a lengthy ban against the offender.

=== Disciplinary statistics ===
- Total number of yellow cards: 121
- Average number of yellow cards: 3.90
- Total number of red cards: 3
- Average number of red cards: 0.097
- First yellow card: Ludovic Magnin - Switzerland against Czech Republic
- First red card: Bastian Schweinsteiger - Germany against Croatia
- Fastest yellow card from kickoff: 1 minute - Angelos Charisteas - Greece against Sweden
- Fastest yellow card after coming on as a substitute: 1 minute - Johan Vonlanthen - Switzerland against Czech Republic
- Latest yellow card in a match without extra time: 90+5 minutes - Milan Baroš - Czech Republic against Turkey (Note: Baroš was booked on the substitutes bench, despite not playing any part in the match)
- Fastest dismissal from kickoff: 24 minutes - Eric Abidal - France against Italy
- Latest dismissal in a match without extra time: 90+2 minutes - Bastian Schweinsteiger - Germany against Croatia, Volkan Demirel - Turkey against Czech Republic
- Latest dismissal in a match with extra time: No dismissals were made in extra time.
- Least time difference between two yellow cards given to the same player: No player was sent off for receiving a second yellow card in a match.
- Most yellow cards (team): 15 - Turkey
- Most red cards (team): 1 - Turkey, France, Germany
- Fewest yellow cards (team): 3 - Sweden
- Most yellow cards (player): 2 - 18 different players
- Most red cards (player): 1 (3 players) - Bastian Schweinsteiger, Eric Abidal, Volkan Demirel
- Most yellow cards (match): 8 - Switzerland vs. Portugal
- Most red cards (match): 1 (3 matches) - Croatia vs. Germany, Turkey vs. Czech Republic, France vs. Italy
- Fewest yellow cards (match): 0 - Spain vs. Russia
- Most cards in one match: 8 yellow cards and 7 yellow cards + 1 red card (2 matches) - Switzerland vs. Portugal, Turkey vs. Czech Republic, France vs. Italy

=== By individual ===
==== Red cards ====
Three red cards were shown over the course of the tournament's 31 matches, an average of 0.097 red cards per match.

1 red card

- (France) Eric Abidal
- (Germany) Bastian Schweinsteiger
- (Turkey) Volkan Demirel

==== Yellow cards ====
121 yellow cards were shown over the course of the tournament's 31 matches, an average of 3.90 yellow cards per match

2 yellow cards

- (Austria) Sebastian Prödl
- (Germany) Michael Ballack
- (Greece) Giorgos Karagounis
- (Italy) Gennaro Gattuso
- (Italy) Andrea Pirlo
- (Poland) Mariusz Lewandowski
- (Romania) Cristian Chivu
- (Romania) Dorin Goian
- (Russia) Denis Kolodin
- (Russia) Dmitri Torbinski
- (Russia) Yuri Zhirkov
- (Switzerland) Tranquillo Barnetta
- (Switzerland) Johan Vonlanthen
- (Turkey) Emre Aşık
- (Turkey) Mehmet Aurélio
- (Turkey) Tuncay
- (Turkey) Sabri Sarıoğlu
- (Turkey) Arda Turan

1 yellow card

- (Austria) Erwin Hoffer
- (Austria) Andreas Ivanschitz
- (Austria) Ümit Korkmaz
- (Austria) Emanuel Pogatetz
- (Austria) Jürgen Säumel
- (Austria) Martin Stranzl
- (Croatia) Robert Kovač
- (Croatia) Jerko Leko
- (Croatia) Luka Modrić
- (Croatia) Josip Šimunić
- (Croatia) Darijo Srna
- (Croatia) Hrvoje Vejić
- (Croatia) Ognjen Vukojević
- (Czech Republic) Milan Baroš
- (Czech Republic) Tomáš Galásek
- (Czech Republic) Jan Polák

1 yellow card (cont.)

- (Czech Republic) Tomáš Ujfaluši
- (France) Jean-Alain Boumsong
- (France) Patrice Evra
- (France) Sidney Govou
- (France) Thierry Henry
- (France) Claude Makélélé
- (France) Willy Sagnol
- (France) Jérémy Toulalan
- (Germany) Arne Friedrich
- (Germany) Kevin Kurányi
- (Germany) Philipp Lahm
- (Germany) Jens Lehmann
- (Germany) Bastian Schweinsteiger
- (Greece) Angelos Basinas
- (Greece) Angelos Charisteas
- (Greece) Nikos Liberopoulos
- (Greece) Giourkas Seitaridis
- (Greece) Vasilis Torosidis
- (Greece) Loukas Vyntra
- (Italy) Massimo Ambrosini
- (Italy) Daniele De Rossi
- (Italy) Luca Toni
- (Italy) Gianluca Zambrotta
- (Netherlands) Khalid Boulahrouz
- (Netherlands) Nigel de Jong
- (Netherlands) André Ooijer
- (Netherlands) Rafael van der Vaart
- (Netherlands) Robin van Persie
- (Poland) Jacek Bąk
- (Poland) Jacek Krzynówek
- (Poland) Ebi Smolarek
- (Poland) Marcin Wasilewski
- (Poland) Tomasz Zahorski
- (Portugal) José Bosingwa
- (Portugal) Paulo Ferreira

1 yellow card (cont.)

- (Portugal) Fernando Meira
- (Portugal) Miguel
- (Portugal) Pepe
- (Portugal) Petit
- (Portugal) Hélder Postiga
- (Portugal) Jorge Ribeiro
- (Romania) Cosmin Contra
- (Romania) Adrian Mutu
- (Romania) Daniel Niculae
- (Russia) Andrei Arshavin
- (Russia) Diniyar Bilyaletdinov
- (Russia) Sergei Semak
- (Russia) Ivan Saenko
- (Spain) Álvaro Arbeloa
- (Spain) Iker Casillas
- (Spain) Santi Cazorla
- (Spain) Dani Güiza
- (Spain) Andrés Iniesta
- (Spain) Carlos Marchena
- (Spain) Fernando Torres
- (Spain) David Villa
- (Sweden) Johan Elmander
- (Sweden) Andreas Isaksson
- (Sweden) Anders Svensson
- (Switzerland) Eren Derdiyok
- (Switzerland) Gelson Fernandes
- (Switzerland) Ludovic Magnin
- (Switzerland) Hakan Yakin
- (Turkey) Hakan Balta
- (Turkey) Uğur Boral
- (Turkey) Colin Kazim-Richards
- (Turkey) Semih Şentürk
- (Turkey) Mehmet Topal
- (Turkey) Gökhan Zan

=== By referee ===
Referee	Matches	Red	Yellow	Red Cards
(Slovakia) Ľuboš Micheľ	3	1	16	1 straight red
(Sweden) Peter Fröjdfeldt	3	1	16	1 straight red
(Belgium) Frank De Bleeckere	3	1	13	1 straight red
(Italy) Roberto Rosetti	4	0	15	
(England) Howard Webb	2	0	10	
(Germany) Herbert Fandel	3	0	10	
(Austria) Konrad Plautz	2	0	8	
(Norway) Tom Henning Øvrebø	2	0	8	
(Spain) Manuel Mejuto González	2	0	7	
(Greece) Kyros Vassaras	2	0	6	
(Netherlands) Pieter Vink	2	0	6	
(Switzerland) Massimo Busacca	3	0	5	

=== By team ===
Last updated after Russia-Spain on 26 June 2008.

Team	Matches	Red	Yellow	Red Cards	Suspensions
Turkey	5	1	15	V. Demirel vs Czech Republic violent conduct	M. Aurélio vs Croatia; E. Aşık vs Germany; V. Demirel vs Croatia; V. Demirel vs Germany; Tuncay vs Germany; A. Turan vs Germany
France	3	1	7	E. Abidal vs Italy professional foul	E. Abidal vs Austria (WCQ)
Germany	6	1	7	B. Schweinsteiger vs Croatia violent conduct	J. Löw (coach) vs Portugal; B. Schweinsteiger vs Austria
Russia	5	0	10		A. Arshavin vs Spain (group stage); A. Arshavin vs Greece; D. Kolodin vs Spain (semi-final); D. Torbinski vs Spain (semi-final)
Austria	3	0	8		S. Prödl vs Germany
Greece	3	0	8		
Switzerland	3	0	8		
Italy	4	0	8		G. Gattuso vs Spain; A. Pirlo vs Spain
Portugal	4	0	8		
Spain	6	0	8		
Poland	3	0	7		
Romania	3	0	7		D. Goian vs Netherlands
Croatia	4	0	7		
Netherlands	4	0	5		
Czech Republic	3	0	4		
Sweden	3	0	3		

== Clean sheets ==
- Most clean sheets: 3 – Spain
- Fewest clean sheets: 0 – Turkey, Austria, Poland, Greece

== Penalty kicks ==
Not counting penalty shoot-outs, there were five penalty kicks awarded during the tournament. For the first time since tournament expansion for Euro 1996, no penalties were awarded during the knockout stage. Romanian Adrian Mutu provided the sole penalty miss, late in the match against world champions Italy; had he scored and Romania held on for the win, the Italians would have been knocked out.

Scored

- Luka Modrić for Croatia v Austria
- Ivica Vastić for Austria v Poland
- Andrea Pirlo for Italy v France
- Hakan Yakin for Switzerland v Portugal

Missed

- Adrian Mutu for Romania v Italy, saved by Gianluigi Buffon

== Overall statistics ==
In the following tables:

- **Pld** = total games played
- **W** = total games won
- **D** = total games drawn (tied)
- **L** = total games lost
- **Pts** = total points accumulated (teams receive three points for a win, one point for a draw and no points for a loss)
- **APts** = average points per game
- **GF** = total goals scored (goals for)
- **AGF** = average goals scored per game
- **GA** = total goals conceded (goals against)
- **AGA** = average goals conceded per game
- **GD** = goal difference (GF−GA)
- **CS** = clean sheets
- **ACS** = average clean sheets
- **YC** = yellow cards
- **AYC** = average yellow cards
- **RC** = red cards
- **ARC** = average red cards

Italics indicates that the nation is a host nation BOLD indicates that this nation has the highest

Matches decided by penalty-kicks in the knockout stage are considered as Draw.

Nation	Pld	W	D	L	Pts	APts	GF	AGF	GA	AGA	GD	CS	ACS	YC	AYC	RC	ARC
Austria	3	0	1	2	1	0.33	1	0.33	3	1.00	−2	0	0.00	8	2.66	0	0.00
Croatia	4	3	1	0	10	2.50	5	1.25	2	0.50	+3	2	**0.50**	6	1.50	0	0.00
Czech Republic	3	1	0	2	3	1.00	4	1.33	6	**2.00**	−2	1	0.33	4	1.33	0	0.00
France	3	0	1	2	1	0.33	1	0.33	6	**2.00**	−5	1	0.33	7	2.33	**1**	**0.33**
Germany	**6**	4	0	2	12	2.00	10	1.66	7	1.16	+3	2	0.33	7	1.16	**1**	0.16
Greece	3	0	0	**3**	0	0.00	1	0.33	5	1.66	−4	0	0.00	8	2.66	0	0.00
Italy	4	1	2	1	5	1.25	3	0.75	4	1.00	−1	2	**0.50**	9	2.25	0	0.00
Netherlands	4	3	0	1	9	2.25	10	**2.50**	4	1.00	**+6**	2	**0.50**	5	1.25	0	0.00
Poland	3	0	1	2	1	0.33	1	0.33	4	1.33	−3	0	0.00	8	2.66	0	0.00
Portugal	4	2	0	2	6	1.50	7	1.75	6	1.50	+1	1	0.25	8	2.00	0	0.00
Romania	3	0	2	1	2	0.66	1	0.33	3	1.00	−2	1	0.33	7	2.33	0	0.00
Russia	5	3	0	2	9	1.80	7	1.40	8	1.60	−1	2	0.40	10	2.00	0	0.00
Spain	**6**	**5**	1	0	**16**	**2.67**	**12**	2.00	3	0.50	**+9**	**3**	**0.50**	8	1.33	0	0.00
Sweden	3	1	0	2	3	1.00	3	1.00	4	1.33	−1	1	0.33	3	1.00	0	0.00
Switzerland	3	1	0	2	3	1.00	3	1.00	3	1.00	0	1	0.33	8	2.66	0	0.00
Turkey	5	2	1	2	7	1.40	8	1.60	**9**	1.80	−1	0	0.00	**16**	**3.20**	**1**	0.20
Total	31	26	5	26	88	2.84	77	2.48	77	2.48	0	19	0.61	122	3.94	3	0.10
