= Switzerland at the UEFA European Championship =

International football delegation

As of 2024, Switzerland have appeared at six UEFA European Championships, between 1996 and 2024. They have advanced past the first round three times, reaching the last 16 in 2016 and the quarter-finals in 2020 for the first time, before being eliminated by Spain on penalties following a 1–1 draw after extra time. They again made it to the quarter-finals in 2024 after defeating defending champions Italy 2–0, but were once again eliminated in the quarter-finals on penalties, this time by England.

== Overall record ==
UEFA European Championship record									Qualification record					
Year	Round	Position	Pld	W	D*	L	GF	GA	Pld	W	D	L	GF	GA
(France) 1960	Did not enter								Did not enter					
(Spain) 1964	Did not qualify								2	0	1	1	2	4
(Italy) 1968	Did not qualify								6	2	1	3	17	13
(Belgium) 1972	Did not qualify								6	4	1	1	12	5
(Socialist Federal Republic of Yugoslavia) 1976	Did not qualify								6	1	1	4	5	10
(Italy) 1980	Did not qualify								8	2	0	6	7	18
(France) 1984	Did not qualify								6	2	2	2	7	9
(West Germany) 1988	Did not qualify								8	1	5	2	9	9
(Sweden) 1992	Did not qualify								8	4	2	2	19	7
(England) 1996	Group stage	13th	3	0	1	2	1	4	8	5	2	1	15	7
(Belgium) (Netherlands) 2000	Did not qualify								8	4	2	2	9	5
(Portugal) 2004	Group stage	15th	3	0	1	2	1	6	8	4	3	1	15	11
(Austria) (Switzerland) 2008	Group stage	11th	3	1	0	2	3	3	Qualified as hosts					
(Poland) (Ukraine) 2012	Did not qualify								8	3	2	3	12	10
(France) 2016	Round of 16	11th	4	1	3	0	3	2	10	7	0	3	24	8
(Europe) 2020	Quarter-finals	7th	5	1	3	1	8	9	8	5	2	1	19	6
(Germany) 2024	Quarter-finals	6th	5	2	3	0	8	4	10	4	5	1	22	11
(United Kingdom) (Republic of Ireland) 2028	To be determined								To be determined					
(Italy) (Turkey) 2032	To be determined								To be determined					
Total	Quarter-finals	6/17	23	5	11	7	24	28	110	48	29	33	194	133

*Denotes draws including knockout matches decided via penalty shoot-out.
**Red border colour indicates that the tournament was held on home soil.

== Euro 1996 ==
=== Group stage ===
Pos	Team	Pld	W	D	L	GF	GA	GD	Pts	Qualification
1	England (H)	3	2	1	0	7	2	+5	7	Advance to knockout stage
2	Netherlands	3	1	1	1	3	4	−1	4 (Note: Tied on head-to-head result (Netherlands 0–0 Scotland) and overall goal difference (−1). Overall goals for was used as the tiebreaker.)	Advance to knockout stage
3	Scotland	3	1	1	1	1	2	−1	4	
4	Switzerland	3	0	1	2	1	4	−3	1	

Source: UEFA
Rules for classification: Group stage tiebreakers
(H) Hosts
Notes:
8 June 1996
15:00

England	1–1	Switzerland
Shearer 23'	Report	Türkyilmaz 83' (pen.)

Wembley Stadium, London
Attendance: 76,567
Referee: Manuel Díaz Vega (Spain)

13 June 1996
19:30

Switzerland	0–2	Netherlands
	Report	Cruyff 66'; Bergkamp 79'

Villa Park, Birmingham
Attendance: 36,800
Referee: Atanas Uzunov (Bulgaria)

18 June 1996
19:30

Scotland	1–0	Switzerland
McCoist 36'	Report

Villa Park, Birmingham
Attendance: 34,926
Referee: Václav Krondl (Czech Republic)

== Euro 2004 ==
=== Group stage ===
Pos	Team	Pld	W	D	L	GF	GA	GD	Pts	Qualification
1	France	3	2	1	0	7	4	+3	7	Advance to knockout stage
2	England	3	2	0	1	8	4	+4	6	Advance to knockout stage
3	Croatia	3	0	2	1	4	6	−2	2	
4	Switzerland	3	0	1	2	1	6	−5	1	

Source: UEFA
Rules for classification: Group stage tiebreakers
13 June 2004
17:00

Switzerland	0–0	Croatia
	Report

Estádio Dr. Magalhães Pessoa, Leiria
Attendance: 24,090
Referee: Lucílio Batista (Portugal)

17 June 2004
17:00

England	3–0	Switzerland
Rooney 23', 75'; Gerrard 82'	Report

Estádio Cidade de Coimbra, Coimbra
Attendance: 28,214
Referee: Valentin Ivanov (Russia)

21 June 2004
19:45

Switzerland	1–3	France
Vonlanthen 26'	Report	Zidane 20'; Henry 76', 84'

Estádio Cidade de Coimbra, Coimbra
Attendance: 28,111
Referee: Ľuboš Micheľ (Slovakia)

== Euro 2008 ==
=== Group stage ===
Pos	Team	Pld	W	D	L	GF	GA	GD	Pts	Qualification
1	Portugal	3	2	0	1	5	3	+2	6 (Note: Head-to-head result: Portugal 2–0 Turkey.)	Advance to knockout stage
2	Turkey	3	2	0	1	5	5	0	6	Advance to knockout stage
3	Czech Republic	3	1	0	2	4	6	−2	3 (Note: Head-to-head result: Switzerland 0–1 Czech Republic.)	
4	Switzerland (H)	3	1	0	2	3	3	0	3	

Source: UEFA
Rules for classification: Group stage tiebreakers
(H) Hosts
Notes:
7 June 2008
18:00

Switzerland	0–1	Czech Republic
	Report	Svěrkoš 71'

St. Jakob-Park, Basel
Attendance: 39,730
Referee: Roberto Rosetti (Italy)

11 June 2008
20:45

Switzerland	1–2	Turkey
Yakin 32'	Report	Şentürk 57'; Turan 90+2'

St. Jakob-Park, Basel
Attendance: 39,730
Referee: Ľuboš Micheľ (Slovakia)

15 June 2008
20:45

Switzerland	2–0	Portugal
Yakin 71', 83' (pen.)	Report

St. Jakob-Park, Basel
Attendance: 39,730
Referee: Konrad Plautz (Austria)

== Euro 2016 ==
=== Group stage ===
Pos	Team	Pld	W	D	L	GF	GA	GD	Pts	Qualification
1	France (H)	3	2	1	0	4	1	+3	7	Advance to knockout stage
2	Switzerland	3	1	2	0	2	1	+1	5	Advance to knockout stage
3	Albania	3	1	0	2	1	3	−2	3	
4	Romania	3	0	1	2	2	4	−2	1	

Source: UEFA
Rules for classification: Group stage tiebreakers
(H) Hosts
11 June 2016
15:00

Albania	0–1	Switzerland
	Report	Schär 5'

Stade Bollaert-Delelis, Lens
Attendance: 33,805
Referee: Carlos Velasco Carballo (Spain)

15 June 2016
18:00

Romania	1–1	Switzerland
Stancu 18' (pen.)	Report	Mehmedi 57'

Parc des Princes, Paris
Attendance: 43,576
Referee: Sergei Karasev (Russia)

19 June 2016
21:00

Switzerland	0–0	France
	Report

Stade Pierre-Mauroy, Villeneuve-d'Ascq
Attendance: 45,616
Referee: Damir Skomina (Slovenia)

=== Knockout stage ===
Round of 16

25 June 2016
15:00

Switzerland	1–1 (a.e.t.)	Poland
Shaqiri 82'	Report	Błaszczykowski 39'
Penalties
Lichtsteiner (penalty scored); Xhaka (penalty missed); Shaqiri (penalty scored); Schär (penalty scored); Rodríguez (penalty scored)	4–5	(penalty scored) Lewandowski; (penalty scored) Milik; (penalty scored) Glik; (penalty scored) Błaszczykowski; (penalty scored) Krychowiak

Stade Geoffroy-Guichard, Saint-Étienne
Attendance: 38,842
Referee: Mark Clattenburg (England)

== Euro 2020 ==
=== Group stage ===
Pos	Team	Pld	W	D	L	GF	GA	GD	Pts	Qualification
1	Italy (H)	3	3	0	0	7	0	+7	9	Advance to knockout stage
2	Wales	3	1	1	1	3	2	+1	4 (Note: Tied on head-to-head result (Wales 1–1 Switzerland). Overall goal difference was used as the tiebreaker.)	Advance to knockout stage
3	Switzerland	3	1	1	1	4	5	−1	4	Advance to knockout stage
4	Turkey	3	0	0	3	1	8	−7	0	

Source: UEFA
Rules for classification: Group stage tiebreakers
(H) Hosts
Notes:
12 June 2021
15:00 (17:00 UTC+4)

Wales	1–1	Switzerland
Moore 74'	Report	Embolo 49'

Olympic Stadium, Baku
Attendance: 8,782
Referee: Clément Turpin (France)

16 June 2021
21:00

Italy	3–0	Switzerland
Locatelli 26', 52'; Immobile 89'	Report

Stadio Olimpico, Rome
Attendance: 12,445
Referee: Sergei Karasev (Russia)

20 June 2021
18:00 (20:00 UTC+4)

Switzerland	3–1	Turkey
Seferovic 6'; Shaqiri 26', 68'	Report	Kahveci 62'

Olympic Stadium, Baku
Attendance: 17,138
Referee: Slavko Vinčić (Slovenia)

Ranking of third-placed teams

Pos	Grp	Team	Pld	W	D	L	GF	GA	GD	Pts	Qualification
1	F	Portugal	3	1	1	1	7	6	+1	4	Advance to knockout stage
2	D	Czech Republic	3	1	1	1	3	2	+1	4	Advance to knockout stage
3	A	Switzerland	3	1	1	1	4	5	−1	4	Advance to knockout stage
4	C	Ukraine	3	1	0	2	4	5	−1	3	Advance to knockout stage
5	B	Finland	3	1	0	2	1	3	−2	3	
6	E	Slovakia	3	1	0	2	2	7	−5	3	

Source: UEFA
Rules for classification: 1) Points; 2) Goal difference; 3) Goals scored; 4) Wins; 5) Lower disciplinary points total; 6) European Qualifiers overall ranking.

=== Knockout stage ===
Round of 16

28 June 2021
21:00 (22:00 UTC+3)

France	3–3 (a.e.t.)	Switzerland
Benzema 57', 59'; Pogba 75'	Report	Seferovic 15', 81'; Gavranović 90'
Penalties
Pogba (penalty scored); Giroud (penalty scored); Thuram (penalty scored); Kimpembe (penalty scored); Mbappé (penalty missed)	4–5	(penalty scored) Gavranović; (penalty scored) Schär; (penalty scored) Akanji; (penalty scored) Vargas; (penalty scored) Mehmedi

Arena Națională, Bucharest
Attendance: 22,642
Referee: Fernando Rapallini (Argentina)

Quarter-finals

2 July 2021
18:00 (19:00 UTC+3)

Switzerland	1–1 (a.e.t.)	Spain
Shaqiri 68'	Report	Zakaria 8' (o.g.)
Penalties
Gavranović (penalty scored); Schär (penalty missed); Akanji (penalty missed); Vargas (penalty missed)	1–3	(penalty missed) Busquets; (penalty scored) Olmo; (penalty missed) Rodri; (penalty scored) Gerard; (penalty scored) Oyarzabal

Krestovsky Stadium, Saint Petersburg
Attendance: 24,764
Referee: Michael Oliver (England)

== Euro 2024 ==
=== Group stage ===
Pos	Team	Pld	W	D	L	GF	GA	GD	Pts	Qualification
1	Germany (H)	3	2	1	0	8	2	+6	7	Advance to knockout stage
2	Switzerland	3	1	2	0	5	3	+2	5	Advance to knockout stage
3	Hungary	3	1	0	2	2	5	−3	3	
4	Scotland	3	0	1	2	2	7	−5	1	

Source: UEFA
(H) Hosts
15 June 2024
15:00

Hungary	1–3	Switzerland
Varga 66'	Report	Duah 12'; Aebischer 45'; Embolo 90+3'

RheinEnergieStadion, Cologne
Attendance: 41,676
Referee: Slavko Vinčić (Slovenia)

19 June 2024
21:00

Scotland	1–1	Switzerland
McTominay 13'	Report	Shaqiri 26'

RheinEnergieStadion, Cologne
Attendance: 42,711
Referee: Ivan Kružliak (Slovakia)

23 June 2024
21:00

Switzerland	1–1	Germany
Ndoye 28'	Report	Füllkrug 90+2'

Waldstadion, Frankfurt
Attendance: 46,685
Referee: Daniele Orsato (Italy)

=== Knockout stage ===
Round of 16

29 June 2024
18:00

Switzerland	2–0	Italy
Freuler 37'; Vargas 46'	Report

Olympiastadion, Berlin
Attendance: 68,172
Referee: Szymon Marciniak (Poland)

Quarter-finals

6 July 2024
18:00

England	1–1 (a.e.t.)	Switzerland
Saka 80'	Report	Embolo 75'
Penalties
Palmer (penalty scored); Bellingham (penalty scored); Saka (penalty scored); Toney (penalty scored); Alexander-Arnold (penalty scored)	5–3	(penalty missed) Akanji; (penalty scored) Schär; (penalty scored) Shaqiri; (penalty scored) Amdouni

Merkur Spiel-Arena, Düsseldorf
Attendance: 46,907
Referee: Daniele Orsato (Italy)

== Goalscorers ==
Player	Goals	1996	2004	2008	2016	2020	2024
Xherdan Shaqiri	5				1	3	1
Breel Embolo	3					1	2
Haris Seferovic	3					3	
Hakan Yakin	3			3			
Michel Aebischer	1						1
Kwadwo Duah	1						1
Remo Freuler	1						1
Mario Gavranović	1					1	
Admir Mehmedi	1				1		
Dan Ndoye	1						1
Fabian Schär	1				1		
Kubilay Türkyilmaz	1	1					
Ruben Vargas	1						1
Johan Vonlanthen	1		1				
Total	24	1	1	3	3	8	8

== See also ==
- Switzerland at the FIFA World Cup

== Head-to-head record ==
Opponent	Pld	W	D	L	GF	GA	GD	Win %
Albania	1	1	0	0	1	0	+1	100.00
Croatia	1	0	1	0	0	0	+0	0.00
Czech Republic	1	0	0	1	0	1	−1	0.00
England	3	0	2	1	2	5	−3	0.00
France	3	0	2	1	4	6	−2	0.00
Germany	1	0	1	0	1	1	+0	0.00
Hungary	1	1	0	0	3	1	+2	100.00
Italy	2	1	0	1	2	3	−1	50.00
Netherlands	1	0	0	1	0	2	−2	0.00
Poland	1	0	1	0	1	1	+0	0.00
Portugal	1	1	0	0	2	0	+2	100.00
Romania	1	0	1	0	1	1	+0	0.00
Scotland	2	0	1	1	1	2	−1	0.00
Spain	1	0	1	0	1	1	+0	0.00
Turkey	2	1	0	1	4	3	+1	50.00
Wales	1	0	1	0	1	1	+0	0.00
Total	23	5	11	7	24	28	−4	21.74
