= UEFA Euro 2004 Group B =

Football tournament group stage

Group B of UEFA Euro 2004 was one of four groups in the final tournament's initial group stage. It began on 13 June and was completed on 21 June. The group consisted of defending champions France, England, Croatia and Switzerland.

France won the group and advanced to the quarter-finals, along with England. Croatia and Switzerland failed to advance.

== Teams ==
Draw position	Team	Pot	Method of qualification	Date of qualification	Finals appearance	Last appearance	Previous best performance	UEFA Rankings November 2003 (Note: The UEFA rankings of November 2003 were used for seeding for the final draw.)	FIFA Rankings June 2004
B1	France	1	Group 1 winner	10 September 2003	6th	2000	Winners (1984, 2000)	1	2
B2	England	2	Group 7 winner	11 October 2003	7th	2000	Third place (1968), Semi-finals (1996)	7	13
B3	Switzerland	4	Group 10 winner	11 October 2003	2nd	1996	Group stage (1996)	22	47
B4	Croatia	3	Play-off winner	19 November 2003	2nd	1996	Quarter-finals (1996)	11	20

== Standings ==
Pos	Team	Pld	W	D	L	GF	GA	GD	Pts	Qualification
1	France	3	2	1	0	7	4	+3	7	Advance to knockout stage
2	England	3	2	0	1	8	4	+4	6	Advance to knockout stage
3	Croatia	3	0	2	1	4	6	−2	2	
4	Switzerland	3	0	1	2	1	6	−5	1	

Source: UEFA
Rules for classification: Group stage tiebreakers

In the quarter-finals,

- The winner of Group B, France, advanced to play the runner-up of Group A, Greece.
- The runner-up of Group B, England, advanced to play the winner of Group A, Portugal.

== Matches ==
=== Switzerland vs Croatia ===
13 June 2004
17:00

Switzerland	0–0	Croatia
	Report

Estádio Dr. Magalhães Pessoa, Leiria
Attendance: 24,090
Referee: Lucílio Batista (Portugal)

Switzerland	Croatia

GK	1	Jörg Stiel (c)	(yellow card) 73'
RB	2	Bernt Haas
CB	5	Murat Yakin
CB	20	Patrick Müller
LB	17	Christoph Spycher
RM	18	Benjamin Huggel	(yellow card) 41'
CM	6	Johann Vogel	(yellow card) 4' (yellow-red card) 50'
LM	8	Raphaël Wicky		(substituted off) 83'
AM	10	Hakan Yakin		(substituted off) 87'
CF	11	Stéphane Chapuisat		(substituted off) 55'
CF	9	Alexander Frei
Substitutions:
MF	16	Fabio Celestini		(substituted on) 55'
DF	4	Stéphane Henchoz		(substituted on) 83'
MF	15	Daniel Gygax		(substituted on) 87'
Manager:
Köbi Kuhn

GK	12	Tomislav Butina
RB	13	Dario Šimić		(substituted off) 61'
CB	21	Robert Kovač
CB	3	Josip Šimunić
LB	6	Boris Živković (c)	(yellow card) 51'
RM	19	Ivica Mornar	(yellow card) 52'
CM	10	Niko Kovač
CM	22	Nenad Bjelica	(yellow card) 30'	(substituted off) 74'
LM	18	Ivica Olić		(substituted off) 46'
CF	9	Dado Pršo	(yellow card) 13'
CF	11	Tomo Šokota
Substitutions:
MF	7	Milan Rapaić	(yellow card) 48'	(substituted on) 46'
MF	8	Darijo Srna		(substituted on) 61'
MF	20	Đovani Roso		(substituted on) 74'
Manager:
Otto Barić

Man of the Match:
Jörg Stiel (Switzerland)

Assistant referees:
Paulo Januário (Portugal)
José Cardinal (Portugal)
Fourth official:
Terje Hauge (Norway)

=== France vs England ===
13 June 2004
19:45

France	2–1	England
Zidane 90+1', 90+3' (pen.)	Report	Lampard 38'

Estádio da Luz, Lisbon
Attendance: 62,487
Referee: Markus Merk (Germany)

France	England

GK	16	Fabien Barthez
RB	5	William Gallas
CB	15	Lilian Thuram
CB	13	Mikaël Silvestre	(yellow card) 72'	(substituted off) 79'
LB	3	Bixente Lizarazu
RM	7	Robert Pires	(yellow card) 49'	(substituted off) 76'
CM	4	Patrick Vieira
CM	6	Claude Makélélé		(substituted off) 90+4'
LM	10	Zinedine Zidane (c)
CF	20	David Trezeguet
CF	12	Thierry Henry
Substitutions:
FW	11	Sylvain Wiltord		(substituted on) 76'
DF	19	Willy Sagnol		(substituted on) 79'
MF	17	Olivier Dacourt		(substituted on) 90+4'
Manager:
Jacques Santini

GK	1	David James	(yellow card) 90+2'
RB	2	Gary Neville
CB	15	Ledley King
CB	6	Sol Campbell
LB	3	Ashley Cole
RM	7	David Beckham (c)
CM	11	Frank Lampard	(yellow card) 71'
CM	4	Steven Gerrard
LM	8	Paul Scholes	(yellow card) 54'	(substituted off) 76'
CF	9	Wayne Rooney		(substituted off) 76'
CF	10	Michael Owen		(substituted off) 69'
Substitutions:
FW	23	Darius Vassell		(substituted on) 69'
MF	18	Owen Hargreaves		(substituted on) 76'
FW	21	Emile Heskey		(substituted on) 76'
Manager:
(Sweden) Sven-Göran Eriksson

Man of the Match:
Zinedine Zidane (France)

Assistant referees:
Christian Schräer (Germany)
Jan-Hendrik Salver (Germany)
Fourth official:
Ľuboš Micheľ (Slovakia)

=== England vs Switzerland ===
17 June 2004
17:00

England	3–0	Switzerland
Rooney 23', 75'; Gerrard 82'	Report

Estádio Cidade de Coimbra, Coimbra
Attendance: 28,214
Referee: Valentin Ivanov (Russia)

England	Switzerland

GK	1	David James
RB	2	Gary Neville
CB	5	John Terry
CB	6	Sol Campbell
LB	3	Ashley Cole
RM	7	David Beckham (c)
CM	4	Steven Gerrard
CM	11	Frank Lampard
LM	8	Paul Scholes		(substituted off) 70'
CF	10	Michael Owen		(substituted off) 72'
CF	9	Wayne Rooney	(yellow card) 18'	(substituted off) 83'
Substitutions:
MF	18	Owen Hargreaves		(substituted on) 70'
FW	23	Darius Vassell		(substituted on) 72'
MF	20	Kieron Dyer		(substituted on) 83'
Manager:
(Sweden) Sven-Göran Eriksson

GK	1	Jörg Stiel (c)
RB	2	Bernt Haas	(yellow card) 49' (yellow-red card) 60'
CB	5	Murat Yakin
CB	20	Patrick Müller
LB	17	Christoph Spycher
RM	18	Benjamin Huggel
CM	16	Fabio Celestini	(yellow card) 23'	(substituted off) 54'
LM	8	Raphaël Wicky
AM	10	Hakan Yakin		(substituted off) 84'
CF	11	Stéphane Chapuisat		(substituted off) 46'
CF	9	Alexander Frei
Substitutions:
MF	15	Daniel Gygax		(substituted on) 46'
MF	7	Ricardo Cabanas		(substituted on) 54'
FW	22	Johan Vonlanthen		(substituted on) 84'
Manager:
Köbi Kuhn

Man of the Match:
Wayne Rooney (England)

Assistant referees:
Yuri Dupanov (Belarus)
Vladimir Eniutin (Russia)
Fourth official:
Kyros Vassaras (Greece)

=== Croatia vs France ===
17 June 2004
19:45

Croatia	2–2	France
Rapaić 48' (pen.); Pršo 52'	Report	Tudor 22' (o.g.); Trezeguet 64'

Estádio Dr. Magalhães Pessoa, Leiria
Attendance: 29,160
Referee: Kim Milton Nielsen (Denmark)

Croatia	France

GK	12	Tomislav Butina
RB	13	Dario Šimić (c)
CB	5	Igor Tudor	(yellow card) 39'
CB	21	Robert Kovač	(yellow card) 64'
LB	3	Josip Šimunić
RM	20	Đovani Roso	(yellow card) 61'
CM	10	Niko Kovač
CM	22	Nenad Bjelica		(substituted off) 68'
LM	7	Milan Rapaić		(substituted off) 87'
CF	9	Dado Pršo
CF	11	Tomo Šokota		(substituted off) 73'
Substitutions:
MF	15	Jerko Leko	(yellow card) 78'	(substituted on) 68'
FW	18	Ivica Olić		(substituted on) 73'
FW	19	Ivica Mornar		(substituted on) 87'
Manager:
Otto Barić

GK	16	Fabien Barthez
RB	5	William Gallas		(substituted off) 81'
CB	15	Lilian Thuram
CB	8	Marcel Desailly (c)
LB	13	Mikaël Silvestre
RM	11	Sylvain Wiltord		(substituted off) 70'
CM	17	Olivier Dacourt	(yellow card) 60'	(substituted off) 79'
CM	4	Patrick Vieira	(yellow card) 32'
LM	10	Zinedine Zidane
CF	20	David Trezeguet
CF	12	Thierry Henry
Substitutions:
MF	7	Robert Pires		(substituted on) 70'
MF	18	Benoît Pedretti		(substituted on) 79'
DF	19	Willy Sagnol		(substituted on) 81'
Manager:
Jacques Santini

Man of the Match:
Dado Pršo (Croatia)

Assistant referees:
Jørgen Jepsen (Denmark)
Jens Larsen (Denmark)
Fourth official:
Anders Frisk (Sweden)

=== Croatia vs England ===
21 June 2004
19:45

Croatia	2–4	England
N. Kovač 5'; Tudor 73'	Report	Scholes 40'; Rooney 45+1', 68'; Lampard 79'

Estádio da Luz, Lisbon
Attendance: 57,047
Referee: Pierluigi Collina (Italy)

Croatia	England

GK	12	Tomislav Butina
RB	13	Dario Šimić	(yellow card) 63'	(substituted off) 67'
CB	5	Igor Tudor
CB	21	Robert Kovač		(substituted off) 46'
LB	3	Josip Šimunić
RM	20	Đovani Roso
CM	10	Niko Kovač
CM	6	Boris Živković (c)
LM	7	Milan Rapaić		(substituted off) 55'
CF	9	Dado Pršo
CF	11	Tomo Šokota
Substitutions:
FW	19	Ivica Mornar		(substituted on) 46'
FW	18	Ivica Olić		(substituted on) 55'
MF	8	Darijo Srna		(substituted on) 67'
Manager:
Otto Barić

GK	1	David James
RB	2	Gary Neville
CB	5	John Terry
CB	6	Sol Campbell
LB	3	Ashley Cole
RM	7	David Beckham (c)
CM	11	Frank Lampard	(substituted off) 84'
CM	4	Steven Gerrard
LM	8	Paul Scholes	(substituted off) 70'
CF	10	Michael Owen
CF	9	Wayne Rooney	(substituted off) 72'
Substitutions:
DF	15	Ledley King	(substituted on) 70'
FW	23	Darius Vassell	(substituted on) 72'
DF	14	Phil Neville	(substituted on) 84'
Manager:
(Sweden) Sven-Göran Eriksson

Man of the Match:
Wayne Rooney (England)

Assistant referees:
Marco Ivaldi (Italy)
Narciso Pisacreta (Italy)
Fourth official:
Manuel Mejuto González (Spain)

=== Switzerland vs France ===
21 June 2004
19:45

Switzerland	1–3	France
Vonlanthen 26'	Report	Zidane 20'; Henry 76', 84'

Estádio Cidade de Coimbra, Coimbra
Attendance: 28,111
Referee: Ľuboš Micheľ (Slovakia)

Switzerland	France

GK	1	Jörg Stiel (c)
RB	4	Stéphane Henchoz		(substituted off) 85'
CB	5	Murat Yakin
CB	20	Patrick Müller
LB	17	Christoph Spycher
RM	7	Ricardo Cabanas
CM	6	Johann Vogel
LM	8	Raphaël Wicky	(yellow card) 66'
AM	15	Daniel Gygax		(substituted off) 85'
AM	10	Hakan Yakin	(yellow card) 43'	(substituted off) 60'
CF	22	Johan Vonlanthen
Substitutions:
MF	18	Benjamin Huggel	(yellow card) 75'	(substituted on) 60'
DF	14	Ludovic Magnin		(substituted on) 85'
FW	21	Milaim Rama		(substituted on) 85'
Manager:
Köbi Kuhn

GK	16	Fabien Barthez
RB	19	Willy Sagnol		(substituted off) 46'
CB	15	Lilian Thuram
CB	13	Mikaël Silvestre
LB	3	Bixente Lizarazu
RM	10	Zinedine Zidane (c)
CM	4	Patrick Vieira
CM	6	Claude Makélélé
LM	7	Robert Pires
CF	20	David Trezeguet		(substituted off) 75'
CF	12	Thierry Henry	(yellow card) 47'
Substitutions:
DF	5	William Gallas		(substituted on) 46'	(substituted off) 90+2'
FW	9	Louis Saha		(substituted on) 75'
DF	2	Jean-Alain Boumsong			(substituted on) 90+2'
Manager:
Jacques Santini

Man of the Match:
Zinedine Zidane (France)

Assistant referees:
Igor Šramka (Slovakia)
Martin Balko (Slovakia)
Fourth official:
Kyros Vassaras (Greece)

== See also ==
- Croatia at the UEFA European Championship
- England at the UEFA European Championship
- France at the UEFA European Championship
- Switzerland at the UEFA European Championship
