= UEFA Euro 2008 knockout stage =

International football tournament stage

The knockout stage of UEFA Euro 2008 began with the quarter-finals on 19 June 2008, and was completed on 29 June 2008 with the final at Ernst-Happel-Stadion in Vienna.

All times Central European Summer Time (UTC+2)

== Format ==
The knockout stage was different from that of past tournaments. Teams in groups A and B were separated from teams in groups C and D until the final. This meant that teams from the same group who advanced past the quarterfinals would play each other again in the semifinals instead of the final. The reason for the format change this year was to equalise the rest periods during the knockout stage. Also, in another major change, for the first time in a European Championship, only two venues (St. Jakob-Park, Basel and Ernst Happel Stadion, Vienna) were used for the seven matches in the knockout stage of the tournament. As with every tournament since UEFA Euro 1984, there was no third place play-off.

Another new rule forgave all single yellow cards received up to and including the quarter-finals. However, players that were booked both in group tournament and quarter-finals missed semi-finals through suspension, but could play in the final. It was thus not possible to be suspended for the final without a red card.

== Qualified teams ==
The top two placed teams from each of the four groups qualified for the knockout stage.

| Group | Winners | Runners-up |
|---|---|---|
| A | Portugal | Turkey |
| B | Croatia | Germany |
| C | Netherlands | Italy |
| D | Spain | Russia |

== Bracket ==
Quarter-finals
19 June – Basel
Portugal | 2
Germany | 3
20 June – Vienna
Croatia | 1 (1)
Turkey (p) | 1 (3)
21 June – Basel
Netherlands | 1
Russia (a.e.t.) | 3
22 June – Vienna
Spain (p) | 0 (4)
Italy | 0 (2)

Semi-finals
25 June – Basel
Germany | 3
Turkey | 2
26 June – Vienna
Russia | 0
Spain | 3

Final
29 June – Vienna
Germany | 0
Spain | 1

== Quarter-finals ==
The first quarter-final saw Group A winners Portugal take on Germany, who finished as runners-up of Group B. Germany's Bastian Schweinsteiger scored the opener half-way through the first half, before Miroslav Klose doubled their lead four minutes later. Portugal pulled one back five minutes before half-time, but Germany restored their two-goal lead on the hour mark. Portugal now needed two goals to take the game to extra time; Hélder Postiga pulled one back, but Germany were able to hang on to qualify for the semi-finals for the first time since 1996.

The second quarter-final was between Croatia and Turkey, and was a less high scoring affair. No goals were scored in normal time, and it took 29 minutes of extra time before Ivan Klasnić put Croatia into the lead. However, two minutes into injury time at the end of extra time Turkey was awarded a free kick. Controversially referee Roberto Rosetti did not allow the Croatian coach to put on a substitute, after Turkey was awarded the free kick, which would have allowed for the Croatian defence to better settle. A long free kick from Turkey goalkeeper Rüştü Reçber found Semih Şentürk on the edge of the area; the striker turned and hit a shot into the top corner of the net to take the game to a penalty shootout. Croatia went first, but only managed to score one of their four penalties, while Turkey scored all three of theirs to win 3–1.

The Group C winners, the Netherlands, who had won all three of their group games, took on Group D runners-up Russia in quarter-final 3. The Netherlands' players wore black armbands in sympathy for the death of Anissa, Khalid Boulahrouz's premature baby daughter. Russia took the lead through Roman Pavlyuchenko just before the hour mark. Ruud van Nistelrooy equalised in the 86th minute. In the 90th minute, Ľuboš Micheľ sent Russian defender Denis Kolodin off for a second booking, but reversed his decision afterwards. The reversal was based on a linesman's (mistaken) observation that the ball was out of play before the tackle. Eugen Strigel, head of the German referee committee, later judged the reversal against regulations as based on a mistaken premise. The Russians played on with 11 players and with two quick-fire goals in the last eight minutes of extra time from Dmitri Torbinski and Andrei Arshavin secured a remarkable win.

The final quarter-final pitted Spain against Italy. In 120 minutes of football, neither team managed to produce a goal, sending the game to penalties. Spain went first and scored three of their first four penalties, Gianluigi Buffon saving the other from Dani Güiza, while Iker Casillas saved two of Italy's four penalties. This left Cesc Fàbregas having to score to send Spain through. He converted, meaning that Spain had won their first competitive match against Italy since the 1920 Summer Olympics and that Spain had qualified for the semi-finals for the first time since 1984.

=== Portugal vs Germany ===
19 June 2008
20:45

| Portugal | 2–3 | Germany |
|---|---|---|
| Nuno Gomes 40'; Postiga 87' | Report | Schweinsteiger 22'; Klose 26'; Ballack 61' |

St. Jakob-Park, Basel
Attendance: 39,374
Referee: Peter Fröjdfeldt (Sweden)

| Portugal | Germany |

| GK | 1 | Ricardo |
| RB | 4 | José Bosingwa |
| CB | 15 | Pepe | (yellow card) 60' |
| CB | 16 | Ricardo Carvalho |
| LB | 2 | Paulo Ferreira |
| CM | 8 | Petit | (yellow card) 26' | (substituted off) 73' |
| CM | 10 | João Moutinho | | (substituted off) 31' |
| RW | 7 | Cristiano Ronaldo |
| AM | 20 | Deco |
| LW | 11 | Simão |
| CF | 21 | Nuno Gomes (c) | | (substituted off) 67' |
Substitutions:
| MF | 6 | Raul Meireles | | (substituted on) 31' |
| MF | 19 | Nani | | (substituted on) 67' |
| FW | 23 | Hélder Postiga | (yellow card) 90' | (substituted on) 73' |
Manager:
(Brazil) Luiz Felipe Scolari

| GK | 1 | Jens Lehmann |
| RB | 3 | Arne Friedrich | (yellow card) 48' |
| CB | 17 | Per Mertesacker |
| CB | 21 | Christoph Metzelder |
| LB | 16 | Philipp Lahm | (yellow card) 49' |
| CM | 6 | Simon Rolfes |
| CM | 13 | Michael Ballack (c) |
| RW | 7 | Bastian Schweinsteiger | | (substituted off) 83' |
| LW | 15 | Thomas Hitzlsperger | | (substituted off) 73' |
| CF | 11 | Miroslav Klose | | (substituted off) 89' |
| CF | 20 | Lukas Podolski |
Substitutions:
| MF | 18 | Tim Borowski | | (substituted on) 73' |
| DF | 4 | Clemens Fritz | | (substituted on) 83' |
| DF | 2 | Marcell Jansen | | (substituted on) 89' |
Manager:
Joachim Löw (Note: Due to the one-match suspension of Germany manager Joachim Löw, assistant manager Hansi Flick took his place on the bench.)

Man of the Match:
Bastian Schweinsteiger (Germany)

Assistant referees:
Stefan Wittberg (Sweden)
Henrik Andrén (Sweden)
Fourth official:
Kyros Vassaras (Greece)
Reserve assistant referee:
Dimitrios Bozatzidis (Greece)

=== Croatia vs Turkey ===
20 June 2008
20:45

| Croatia | 1–1 (a.e.t.) | Turkey |
|---|---|---|
| Klasnić 119' | Report | Şentürk 120+2' |
Penalties
| Modrić (penalty missed); Srna (penalty scored); Rakitić (penalty missed); Petrić (penalty missed) | 1–3 | (penalty scored) Turan; (penalty scored) Şentürk; (penalty scored) Altıntop |

Ernst-Happel-Stadion, Vienna
Attendance: 51,428
Referee: Roberto Rosetti (Italy)

| Croatia | Turkey |

| GK | 1 | Stipe Pletikosa |
| RB | 5 | Vedran Ćorluka |
| CB | 4 | Robert Kovač |
| CB | 3 | Josip Šimunić |
| LB | 22 | Danijel Pranjić |
| CM | 14 | Luka Modrić |
| CM | 10 | Niko Kovač (c) |
| RW | 11 | Darijo Srna |
| LW | 7 | Ivan Rakitić |
| SS | 19 | Niko Kranjčar | (substituted off) 65' |
| CF | 18 | Ivica Olić | (substituted off) 97' |
Substitutions:
| FW | 21 | Mladen Petrić | (substituted on) 65' |
| FW | 17 | Ivan Klasnić | (substituted on) 97' |
Manager:
Slaven Bilić

| GK | 1 | Rüştü Reçber |
| RB | 22 | Hamit Altıntop |
| CB | 4 | Gökhan Zan |
| CB | 15 | Emre Aşık | (yellow card) 107' |
| LB | 3 | Hakan Balta |
| DM | 6 | Mehmet Topal | | (substituted off) 76' |
| RM | 20 | Sabri Sarıoğlu |
| CM | 17 | Tuncay Şanlı | (yellow card) 27' |
| LM | 14 | Arda Turan | (yellow card) 49' |
| CF | 18 | Colin Kazim-Richards | | (substituted off) 61' |
| CF | 8 | Nihat Kahveci (c) | | (substituted off) 117' |
Substitutions:
| DF | 16 | Uğur Boral | (yellow card) 89' | (substituted on) 61' |
| FW | 9 | Semih Şentürk | | (substituted on) 76' |
| MF | 10 | Gökdeniz Karadeniz | | (substituted on) 117' |
Manager:
Fatih Terim

Man of the Match:
Hamit Altıntop (Turkey)

Assistant referees:
Alessandro Griselli (Italy)
Paolo Calcagno (Italy)
Fourth official:
Manuel Mejuto González (Spain)
Reserve assistant referee:
Juan Carlos Yuste Jiménez (Spain)

=== Netherlands vs Russia ===
21 June 2008
20:45

| Netherlands | 1–3 (a.e.t.) | Russia |
|---|---|---|
| Van Nistelrooy 86' | Report | Pavlyuchenko 56'; Torbinski 112'; Arshavin 116' |

St. Jakob-Park, Basel
Attendance: 38,374
Referee: Ľuboš Micheľ (Slovakia)

| Netherlands | Russia |

| GK | 1 | Edwin van der Sar (c) |
| RB | 21 | Khalid Boulahrouz | (yellow card) 50' | (substituted off) 54' |
| CB | 2 | André Ooijer |
| CB | 4 | Joris Mathijsen |
| LB | 5 | Giovanni van Bronckhorst |
| CM | 17 | Nigel de Jong |
| CM | 8 | Orlando Engelaar | | (substituted off) 62' |
| RW | 18 | Dirk Kuyt | | (substituted off) 46' |
| AM | 23 | Rafael van der Vaart | (yellow card) 60' |
| LW | 10 | Wesley Sneijder |
| CF | 9 | Ruud van Nistelrooy |
Substitutions:
| FW | 7 | Robin van Persie | (yellow card) 55' | (substituted on) 46' |
| DF | 3 | John Heitinga | | (substituted on) 54' |
| MF | 20 | Ibrahim Afellay | | (substituted on) 62' |
Manager:
Marco van Basten

| GK | 1 | Igor Akinfeev |
| RB | 22 | Aleksandr Anyukov |
| CB | 4 | Sergei Ignashevich |
| CB | 8 | Denis Kolodin | (yellow card) 71' |
| LB | 18 | Yuri Zhirkov | (yellow card) 103' |
| DM | 11 | Sergei Semak (c) |
| RM | 17 | Konstantin Zyryanov |
| CM | 20 | Igor Semshov | | (substituted off) 69' |
| LM | 9 | Ivan Saenko | | (substituted off) 81' |
| SS | 10 | Andrei Arshavin |
| CF | 19 | Roman Pavlyuchenko | | (substituted off) 115' |
Substitutions:
| MF | 15 | Diniyar Bilyaletdinov | | (substituted on) 69' |
| MF | 7 | Dmitri Torbinski | (yellow card) 111' | (substituted on) 81' |
| FW | 21 | Dmitri Sychev | | (substituted on) 115' |
Manager:
(Netherlands) Guus Hiddink

Man of the Match:
Andrei Arshavin (Russia)

Assistant referees:
Roman Slyško (Slovakia)
Martin Balko (Slovakia)
Fourth official:
Massimo Busacca (Switzerland)
Reserve assistant referee:
Matthias Arnet (Switzerland)

=== Spain vs Italy ===
22 June 2008
20:45

| Spain | 0–0 (a.e.t.) | Italy |
|---|---|---|
| | Report |
Penalties
| Villa (penalty scored); Cazorla (penalty scored); Senna (penalty scored); Güiza (penalty missed); Fàbregas (penalty scored) | 4–2 | (penalty scored) Grosso; (penalty missed) De Rossi; (penalty scored) Camoranesi; (penalty missed) Di Natale |

Ernst-Happel-Stadion, Vienna
Attendance: 51,178
Referee: Herbert Fandel (Germany)

| Spain | Italy |

| GK | 1 | Iker Casillas (c) |
| RB | 15 | Sergio Ramos |
| CB | 4 | Carlos Marchena |
| CB | 5 | Carles Puyol |
| LB | 11 | Joan Capdevila |
| RM | 6 | Andrés Iniesta | (yellow card) 11' | (substituted off) 59' |
| CM | 19 | Marcos Senna |
| CM | 8 | Xavi | | (substituted off) 60' |
| LM | 21 | David Silva |
| CF | 7 | David Villa | (yellow card) 72' |
| CF | 9 | Fernando Torres | | (substituted off) 85' |
Substitutions:
| MF | 12 | Santi Cazorla | (yellow card) 113' | (substituted on) 59' |
| MF | 10 | Cesc Fàbregas | | (substituted on) 60' |
| FW | 17 | Dani Güiza | | (substituted on) 85' |
Manager:
Luis Aragonés

| GK | 1 | Gianluigi Buffon (c) |
| RB | 19 | Gianluca Zambrotta |
| CB | 2 | Christian Panucci |
| CB | 4 | Giorgio Chiellini |
| LB | 3 | Fabio Grosso |
| RM | 22 | Alberto Aquilani | | (substituted off) 108' |
| CM | 10 | Daniele De Rossi |
| LM | 13 | Massimo Ambrosini | (yellow card) 31' |
| AM | 20 | Simone Perrotta | | (substituted off) 58' |
| CF | 9 | Luca Toni |
| CF | 18 | Antonio Cassano | | (substituted off) 75' |
Substitutions:
| MF | 16 | Mauro Camoranesi | | (substituted on) 58' |
| FW | 11 | Antonio Di Natale | | (substituted on) 75' |
| FW | 7 | Alessandro Del Piero | | (substituted on) 108' |
Manager:
Roberto Donadoni

Man of the Match:
Iker Casillas (Spain)

Assistant referees:
Carsten Kadach (Germany)
Volker Wezel (Germany)
Fourth official:
Frank De Bleeckere (Belgium)
Reserve assistant referee:
Peter Hermans (Belgium)

== Semi-finals ==
The first semi-final saw Group B runner-up and three-time champions Germany face Group A runner-up and first time semi-finalists Turkey. Turkey scored first as Uğur Boral converted a rebound from the crossbar. Bastian Schweinsteiger equalised for Germany four minutes later. In the 79th minute, Miroslav Klose headed Germany into the lead with his second goal of the tournament. Turkey managed to get back seven minutes later when Semih Şentürk flicked the ball past Jens Lehmann. The match was headed for extra time when defender Philipp Lahm in the 90th minute scored the final goal and sent Germany into their sixth European Championship final. The TV broadcast of the match experienced technical difficulties caused by severe thunderstorms in Vienna, Austria, from where the television broadcast was transmitted. Television pictures in several countries were interrupted on three occasions, including at the time of Klose and Semih's goals. The entire match was recorded and distributed to all countries.

The second semi-final was a replay of the opening match of Group D, Spain in their first semi-final since 1984 faced Russia who had not been in a semi-final since 1988 as the Soviet Union. The first half was scoreless, but five minutes into the second, Xavi opened the scoring. Dani Güiza replaced Fernando Torres in the 69th minute and scored the second goal for Spain in four minutes. David Silva rounded up the scoring with Spain's third of the night, sending Spain into their third European Championship final.

=== Germany vs Turkey ===
25 June 2008
20:45

| Germany | 3–2 | Turkey |
|---|---|---|
| Schweinsteiger 26'; Klose 79'; Lahm 90' | Report | Boral 22'; Şentürk 86' |

St. Jakob-Park, Basel
Attendance: 39,374
Referee: Massimo Busacca (Switzerland)

| Germany | Turkey |

| GK | 1 | Jens Lehmann |
| RB | 3 | Arne Friedrich |
| CB | 17 | Per Mertesacker |
| CB | 21 | Christoph Metzelder |
| LB | 16 | Philipp Lahm |
| CM | 15 | Thomas Hitzlsperger |
| CM | 6 | Simon Rolfes | (substituted off) 46' |
| RW | 7 | Bastian Schweinsteiger |
| AM | 13 | Michael Ballack (c) |
| LW | 20 | Lukas Podolski |
| CF | 11 | Miroslav Klose | (substituted off) 90+2' |
Substitutions:
| MF | 8 | Torsten Frings | (substituted on) 46' |
| DF | 2 | Marcell Jansen | (substituted on) 90+2' |
Manager:
Joachim Löw

| GK | 1 | Rüştü Reçber (c) |
| RB | 20 | Sabri Sarıoğlu | (yellow card) 90+4' |
| CB | 6 | Mehmet Topal |
| CB | 4 | Gökhan Zan |
| LB | 3 | Hakan Balta |
| DM | 7 | Mehmet Aurélio |
| RM | 18 | Colin Kazim-Richards | | (substituted off) 90+2' |
| CM | 22 | Hamit Altıntop |
| CM | 19 | Ayhan Akman | | (substituted off) 81' |
| LM | 16 | Uğur Boral | | (substituted off) 84' |
| CF | 9 | Semih Şentürk | (yellow card) 53' |
Substitutions:
| FW | 21 | Mevlüt Erdinç | | (substituted on) 81' |
| MF | 10 | Gökdeniz Karadeniz | | (substituted on) 84' |
| MF | 11 | Tümer Metin | | (substituted on) 90+2' |
Manager:
Fatih Terim

Man of the Match:
Philipp Lahm (Germany)

Assistant referees:
Matthias Arnet (Switzerland)
Stéphane Cuhat (Switzerland)
Fourth official:
Peter Fröjdfeldt (Sweden)
Reserve assistant referee:
Henrik Andrén (Sweden)

=== Russia vs Spain ===
26 June 2008
20:45

| Russia | 0–3 | Spain |
|---|---|---|
| | Report | Xavi 50'; Güiza 73'; Silva 82' |

Ernst-Happel-Stadion, Vienna
Attendance: 51,428
Referee: Frank De Bleeckere (Belgium)

| Russia | Spain |

| GK | 1 | Igor Akinfeev |
| RB | 22 | Aleksandr Anyukov |
| CB | 2 | Vasili Berezutski |
| CB | 4 | Sergei Ignashevich |
| LB | 18 | Yuri Zhirkov | (yellow card) 56' |
| DM | 11 | Sergei Semak (c) |
| RM | 17 | Konstantin Zyryanov |
| CM | 20 | Igor Semshov | | (substituted off) 56' |
| LM | 9 | Ivan Saenko | | (substituted off) 57' |
| SS | 10 | Andrei Arshavin |
| CF | 19 | Roman Pavlyuchenko |
Substitutions:
| MF | 15 | Diniyar Bilyaletdinov | (yellow card) 60' | (substituted on) 56' |
| FW | 21 | Dmitri Sychev | | (substituted on) 57' |
Manager:
(Netherlands) Guus Hiddink

| GK | 1 | Iker Casillas (c) |
| RB | 15 | Sergio Ramos |
| CB | 4 | Carlos Marchena |
| CB | 5 | Carles Puyol |
| LB | 11 | Joan Capdevila |
| RM | 6 | Andrés Iniesta |
| CM | 19 | Marcos Senna |
| CM | 8 | Xavi | (substituted off) 69' |
| LM | 21 | David Silva |
| CF | 7 | David Villa | (substituted off) 34' |
| CF | 9 | Fernando Torres | (substituted off) 69' |
Substitutions:
| MF | 10 | Cesc Fàbregas | (substituted on) 34' |
| MF | 14 | Xabi Alonso | (substituted on) 69' |
| FW | 17 | Dani Güiza | (substituted on) 69' |
Manager:
Luis Aragonés

Man of the Match:
Andrés Iniesta (Spain)

Assistant referees:
Peter Hermans (Belgium)
Alex Verstraeten (Belgium)
Fourth official:
Kyros Vassaras (Greece)
Reserve assistant referee:
Dimitrios Saraidaris (Greece)

== Final ==
The final match was played between Germany and Spain on 29 June 2008 at the Ernst Happel Stadion in Vienna, Austria. Spain won the match 1–0, the winning goal scored by Fernando Torres.

29 June 2008
20:45

| Germany | 0–1 | Spain |
|---|---|---|
| | Report | Torres 33' |

Ernst-Happel-Stadion, Vienna
Attendance: 51,428
Referee: Roberto Rosetti (Italy)

| Germany | Spain |

| GK | 1 | Jens Lehmann |
| RB | 3 | Arne Friedrich |
| CB | 17 | Per Mertesacker |
| CB | 21 | Christoph Metzelder |
| LB | 16 | Philipp Lahm | | (substituted off) 46' |
| CM | 8 | Torsten Frings |
| CM | 15 | Thomas Hitzlsperger | | (substituted off) 58' |
| RW | 7 | Bastian Schweinsteiger |
| AM | 13 | Michael Ballack (c) | (yellow card) 43' |
| LW | 20 | Lukas Podolski |
| CF | 11 | Miroslav Klose | | (substituted off) 79' |
Substitutions:
| DF | 2 | Marcell Jansen | | (substituted on) 46' |
| FW | 22 | Kevin Kurányi | (yellow card) 88' | (substituted on) 58' |
| FW | 9 | Mario Gómez | | (substituted on) 79' |
Manager:
Joachim Löw

| GK | 1 | Iker Casillas (c) | (yellow card) 43' |
| RB | 15 | Sergio Ramos |
| CB | 4 | Carlos Marchena |
| CB | 5 | Carles Puyol |
| LB | 11 | Joan Capdevila |
| DM | 19 | Marcos Senna |
| RM | 6 | Andrés Iniesta |
| CM | 8 | Xavi |
| CM | 10 | Cesc Fàbregas | | (substituted off) 63' |
| LM | 21 | David Silva | | (substituted off) 66' |
| CF | 9 | Fernando Torres | (yellow card) 74' | (substituted off) 78' |
Substitutions:
| MF | 14 | Xabi Alonso | | (substituted on) 63' |
| MF | 12 | Santi Cazorla | | (substituted on) 66' |
| FW | 17 | Dani Güiza | | (substituted on) 78' |
Manager:
Luis Aragonés

Man of the Match:
Fernando Torres (Spain)

Assistant referees:
Alessandro Griselli (Italy)
Paolo Calcagno (Italy)
Fourth official:
Peter Fröjdfeldt (Sweden)
Reserve assistant referee:
Stefan Wittberg (Sweden)
