= UEFA Euro 2008 Group A =

Football tournament group stage

Group A of UEFA Euro 2008 was played from 7 to 15 June 2008. All six group matches were played at venues in Switzerland, in Basel and Geneva. The group consisted of co-hosts Switzerland, UEFA Euro 2004 hosts and finalists Portugal, as well as the Czech Republic and Turkey. Portugal, the Czech Republic, and Türkiye were later drawn in same group in the UEFA Euro 2024.

Portugal won their first two games against Turkey and the Czech Republic, scoring five goals in the process, to qualify for the quarter-finals as group winners. The second quarter-final berth was to go to the winners of the match between Turkey and the Czech Republic. As the two teams had identical records going into the game, if the match had finished as a draw, the quarter-final place would have been determined by a penalty shoot-out – what would have been the first group stage penalty shoot-out in a major international tournament. Meanwhile, Switzerland became the first team to be eliminated from the tournament after losing to Turkey 2–1 in their second match, Arda Turan scoring a deflected winner in the last minute, having lost 1–0 to the Czech Republic in their opening match. This match between Switzerland and Turkey was dubbed the "Bath of Basel" as the rain poured down incessantly. The weather suited the long-ball Swiss more than the short-passing Turks, and before half-time, the Swiss had capitalized on the conditions. Indeed, Hakan Yakin's goal stemmed from the ball stopping in a puddle and allowing him an easy finish. In the second half, Turkey's more direct style yielded two goals, the second a last-minute long-range shot from Arda Turan which went in off a deflection. This was the first of several last-gasp victories for the Turkish team at the tournament, made all the more impressive by their injury woes at that time.

The final round of matches saw the Portuguese name an under-strength team for their match against Switzerland, their progression already assured as group winners. Their opponents, however, fielded a strong side and won the match 2–0, securing their first win in a European Championship. Meanwhile, with a place in the quarter-finals to play for, Turkey and the Czech Republic each had to win to qualify. The Czechs went into half time 1–0 up, and doubled their lead soon after half-time. Arda Turan brought the Turks back into the game in the 75th minute, before Petr Čech made an uncharacteristic error, dropping the ball at the feet of Nihat Kahveci, who was left with a simple finish. Boosted by the equaliser, Turkey went for the win, and two minutes later, Nihat curled the ball past Čech from 20 yards. Then, with just moments left to play, the Turkish goalkeeper Volkan Demirel pushed over the big Czech striker Jan Koller, resulting in a red card for the Turk. With no substitutions left, Turkey had to put Tuncay Şanlı in goal, but still managed to secure their place in the quarter-finals. Tempers continued to boil over, as Milan Baroš was booked, despite having been on the bench for the whole game.

== Teams ==
Draw position	Team	Pot	Method of qualification	Date of qualification	Finals appearance	Last appearance	Previous best performance	UEFA Rankings		FIFA Rankings June 2008
Draw position	Team	Pot	Method of qualification	Date of qualification	Finals appearance	Last appearance	Previous best performance	November 2007 (Note: The UEFA rankings of November 2007 were used for seeding for the final draw.)	May 2008 (Note: UEFA unveiled a new ranking system in May 2008 based on results up to November 2007.)	FIFA Rankings June 2008
A1	Switzerland	1	Co-host	12 December 2002	3rd	2004	Group stage (1996, 2004)	19	16	44
A2	Czech Republic (Note: From 1960 to 1980, the Czech Republic competed as Czechoslovakia.)	2	Group D winner	17 October 2007	7th	2004	Winners (1976)	4	3	6
A3	Portugal	3	Group A runner-up	21 November 2007	5th	2004	Runners-up (2004)	8	5	11
A4	Turkey	4	Group C runner-up	21 November 2007	3rd	2000	Quarter-finals (2000)	14	14	20

== Standings ==
Pos	Team	Pld	W	D	L	GF	GA	GD	Pts	Qualification
1	Portugal	3	2	0	1	5	3	+2	6 (Note: Head-to-head result: Portugal 2–0 Turkey.)	Advance to knockout stage
2	Turkey	3	2	0	1	5	5	0	6	Advance to knockout stage
3	Czech Republic	3	1	0	2	4	6	−2	3 (Note: Head-to-head result: Switzerland 0–1 Czech Republic.)	
4	Switzerland (H)	3	1	0	2	3	3	0	3	

Source: UEFA
Rules for classification: Group stage tiebreakers
(H) Hosts
Notes:

In the quarter-finals,

- The winner of Group A, Portugal, advanced to play the runner-up of Group B, Germany.
- The runner-up of Group A, Turkey, advanced to play the winner of Group B, Croatia.

== Matches ==
=== Switzerland vs Czech Republic ===
7 June 2008
18:00

Switzerland	0–1	Czech Republic
	Report	Svěrkoš 71'

St. Jakob-Park, Basel
Attendance: 39,730
Referee: Roberto Rosetti (Italy)

Switzerland	Czech Republic

GK	1	Diego Benaglio
RB	5	Stephan Lichtsteiner		(substituted off) 75'
CB	20	Patrick Müller
CB	4	Philippe Senderos
LB	3	Ludovic Magnin	(yellow card) 59'
CM	8	Gökhan Inler
CM	15	Gelson Fernandes
RW	19	Valon Behrami		(substituted off) 84'
LW	16	Tranquillo Barnetta	(yellow card) 90+3'
CF	9	Alexander Frei (c)		(substituted off) 46'
CF	11	Marco Streller
Substitutions:
MF	10	Hakan Yakin		(substituted on) 46'
FW	22	Johan Vonlanthen	(yellow card) 76'	(substituted on) 75'
FW	12	Eren Derdiyok		(substituted on) 84'
Manager:
Köbi Kuhn

GK	1	Petr Čech
RB	2	Zdeněk Grygera
CB	21	Tomáš Ujfaluši (c)
CB	22	David Rozehnal
LB	6	Marek Jankulovski
DM	4	Tomáš Galásek
CM	14	David Jarolím	(substituted off) 87'
CM	3	Jan Polák
RW	7	Libor Sionko	(substituted off) 83'
LW	20	Jaroslav Plašil
CF	9	Jan Koller	(substituted off) 56'
Substitutions:
FW	10	Václav Svěrkoš	(substituted on) 56'
FW	11	Stanislav Vlček	(substituted on) 83'
MF	5	Radoslav Kováč	(substituted on) 87'
Manager:
Karel Brückner

Man of the Match:
Tomáš Ujfaluši (Czech Republic)

Assistant referees:
Alessandro Griselli (Italy)
Paolo Calcagno (Italy)
Fourth official:
Stéphane Lannoy (France)
Reserve assistant referee:
Alex Verstraeten (Belgium)

=== Portugal vs Turkey ===
7 June 2008
20:45

Portugal	2–0	Turkey
Pepe 61'; Meireles 90+3'	Report

Stade de Genève, Geneva
Attendance: 29,106
Referee: Herbert Fandel (Germany)

Portugal	Turkey

GK	1	Ricardo
RB	4	José Bosingwa
CB	15	Pepe
CB	16	Ricardo Carvalho
LB	2	Paulo Ferreira
CM	8	Petit
CM	10	João Moutinho
RW	7	Cristiano Ronaldo
AM	20	Deco	(substituted off) 90+2'
LW	11	Simão	(substituted off) 83'
CF	21	Nuno Gomes (c)	(substituted off) 69'
Substitutions:
FW	19	Nani	(substituted on) 69'
MF	6	Raul Meireles	(substituted on) 83'
DF	5	Fernando Meira	(substituted on) 90+2'
Manager:
(Brazil) Luiz Felipe Scolari

GK	23	Volkan Demirel
RB	22	Hamit Altıntop		(substituted off) 76'
CB	2	Servet Çetin
CB	4	Gökhan Zan	(yellow card) 51'	(substituted off) 55'
LB	3	Hakan Balta
RM	18	Colin Kazim-Richards	(yellow card) 4'
CM	5	Emre Belözoğlu (c)
LM	7	Mehmet Aurélio
AM	21	Mevlüt Erdinç		(substituted off) 46'
AM	17	Tuncay Şanlı
CF	8	Nihat Kahveci
Substitutions:
DF	20	Sabri Sarıoğlu	(yellow card) 73'	(substituted on) 46'
DF	15	Emre Aşık		(substituted on) 55'
FW	9	Semih Şentürk		(substituted on) 76'
Manager:
Fatih Terim

Man of the Match:
Pepe (Portugal)

Assistant referees:
Carsten Kadach (Germany)
Volker Wezel (Germany)
Fourth official:
Viktor Kassai (Hungary)
Reserve assistant referee:
Peter Hermans (Belgium)

=== Czech Republic vs Portugal ===
11 June 2008
18:00

Czech Republic	1–3	Portugal
Sionko 17'	Report	Deco 8'; Ronaldo 63'; Quaresma 90+1'

Stade de Genève, Geneva
Attendance: 29,016
Referee: Kyros Vassaras (Greece)

Czech Republic	Portugal

GK	1	Petr Čech
RB	2	Zdeněk Grygera
CB	21	Tomáš Ujfaluši (c)
CB	22	David Rozehnal
LB	6	Marek Jankulovski
DM	4	Tomáš Galásek		(substituted off) 73'
CM	17	Marek Matějovský		(substituted off) 68'
CM	3	Jan Polák	(yellow card) 22'
RW	7	Libor Sionko
LW	20	Jaroslav Plašil		(substituted off) 84'
CF	15	Milan Baroš
Substitutions:
FW	11	Stanislav Vlček		(substituted on) 68'
FW	9	Jan Koller		(substituted on) 73'
MF	14	David Jarolím		(substituted on) 84'
Manager:
Karel Brückner

GK	1	Ricardo
RB	4	José Bosingwa	(yellow card) 31'
CB	15	Pepe
CB	16	Ricardo Carvalho
LB	2	Paulo Ferreira
CM	8	Petit
CM	10	João Moutinho		(substituted off) 75'
RW	7	Cristiano Ronaldo
AM	20	Deco
LW	11	Simão		(substituted off) 80'
CF	21	Nuno Gomes (c)		(substituted off) 79'
Substitutions:
DF	5	Fernando Meira		(substituted on) 75'
FW	9	Hugo Almeida		(substituted on) 79'
MF	17	Ricardo Quaresma		(substituted on) 80'
Manager:
(Brazil) Luiz Felipe Scolari

Man of the Match:
Cristiano Ronaldo (Portugal)

Assistant referees:
Dimitrios Bozatzidis (Greece)
Dimitrios Saraidaris (Greece)
Fourth official:
Kristinn Jakobsson (Iceland)
Reserve assistant referee:
Adriaan Inia (Netherlands)

=== Switzerland vs Turkey ===
11 June 2008
20:45

Switzerland	1–2	Turkey
Yakin 32'	Report	Şentürk 57'; Turan 90+2'

St. Jakob-Park, Basel
Attendance: 39,730
Referee: Ľuboš Micheľ (Slovakia)

Switzerland	Turkey

GK	1	Diego Benaglio
RB	5	Stephan Lichtsteiner
CB	20	Patrick Müller
CB	4	Philippe Senderos
LB	3	Ludovic Magnin (c)
RM	19	Valon Behrami
CM	8	Gökhan Inler
CM	15	Gelson Fernandes		(substituted off) 76'
LM	16	Tranquillo Barnetta		(substituted off) 66'
SS	10	Hakan Yakin		(substituted off) 85'
CF	12	Eren Derdiyok	(yellow card) 55'
Substitutions:
FW	22	Johan Vonlanthen		(substituted on) 66'
MF	7	Ricardo Cabanas		(substituted on) 76'
FW	14	Daniel Gygax		(substituted on) 85'
Manager:
Köbi Kuhn

GK	23	Volkan Demirel
RB	22	Hamit Altıntop
CB	15	Emre Aşık
CB	2	Servet Çetin
LB	3	Hakan Balta	(yellow card) 48'
DM	7	Mehmet Aurélio	(yellow card) 41'
RM	10	Gökdeniz Karadeniz		(substituted off) 46'
LM	14	Arda Turan
AM	11	Tümer Metin		(substituted off) 46'
CF	8	Nihat Kahveci (c)		(substituted off) 85'
CF	17	Tuncay Şanlı	(yellow card) 31'
Substitutions:
MF	6	Mehmet Topal		(substituted on) 46'
FW	9	Semih Şentürk		(substituted on) 46'
FW	18	Colin Kazim-Richards		(substituted on) 85'
Manager:
Fatih Terim

Man of the Match:
Arda Turan (Turkey)

Assistant referees:
Roman Slyško (Slovakia)
Martin Balko (Slovakia)
Fourth official:
Damir Skomina (Slovenia)
Reserve assistant referee:
Hans ten Hoove (Netherlands)

=== Switzerland vs Portugal ===
15 June 2008
20:45

Switzerland	2–0	Portugal
Yakin 71', 83' (pen.)	Report

St. Jakob-Park, Basel
Attendance: 39,730
Referee: Konrad Plautz (Austria)

Switzerland	Portugal

GK	18	Pascal Zuberbühler
RB	5	Stephan Lichtsteiner		(substituted off) 83'
CB	20	Patrick Müller
CB	4	Philippe Senderos
LB	3	Ludovic Magnin (c)
RM	19	Valon Behrami
CM	15	Gelson Fernandes	(yellow card) 90+2'
CM	8	Gökhan Inler
LM	22	Johan Vonlanthen	(yellow card) 37'	(substituted off) 61'
SS	10	Hakan Yakin	(yellow card) 27'	(substituted off) 86'
CF	12	Eren Derdiyok
Substitutions:
MF	16	Tranquillo Barnetta	(yellow card) 81'	(substituted on) 61'
DF	13	Stéphane Grichting		(substituted on) 83'
MF	7	Ricardo Cabanas		(substituted on) 86'
Manager:
Köbi Kuhn

GK	1	Ricardo
RB	13	Miguel	(yellow card) 81'
CB	15	Pepe
CB	3	Bruno Alves
LB	2	Paulo Ferreira	(yellow card) 30'	(substituted off) 41'
CM	5	Fernando Meira (c)	(yellow card) 78'
CM	18	Miguel Veloso		(substituted off) 71'
CM	6	Raul Meireles
RW	17	Ricardo Quaresma
LW	19	Nani
CF	23	Hélder Postiga		(substituted off) 74'
Substitutions:
DF	14	Jorge Ribeiro	(yellow card) 64'	(substituted on) 41'
MF	10	João Moutinho		(substituted on) 71'
FW	9	Hugo Almeida		(substituted on) 74'
Manager:
(Brazil) Luiz Felipe Scolari

Man of the Match:
Hakan Yakin (Switzerland)

Assistant referees:
Egon Bereuter (Austria)
Markus Mayr (Austria)
Fourth official:
Ivan Bebek (Croatia)
Reserve assistant referee:
Geir Åge Holen (Norway)

=== Turkey vs Czech Republic ===
15 June 2008
20:45

Turkey	3–2	Czech Republic
Turan 75'; Kahveci 87', 89'	Report	Koller 34'; Plašil 62'

Stade de Genève, Geneva
Attendance: 29,016
Referee: Peter Fröjdfeldt (Sweden)

Turkey	Czech Republic

GK	23	Volkan Demirel	(red card) 90+2'
RB	22	Hamit Altıntop
CB	13	Emre Güngör		(substituted off) 63'
CB	2	Servet Çetin
LB	3	Hakan Balta
RM	6	Mehmet Topal	(yellow card) 6'	(substituted off) 57'
CM	7	Mehmet Aurélio	(yellow card) 10'
CM	14	Arda Turan	(yellow card) 62'
LM	17	Tuncay Şanlı
CF	8	Nihat Kahveci (c)
CF	9	Semih Şentürk		(substituted off) 46'
Substitutions:
DF	20	Sabri Sarıoğlu		(substituted on) 46'
FW	18	Colin Kazim-Richards		(substituted on) 57'
DF	15	Emre Aşık	(yellow card) 73'	(substituted on) 63'
Manager:
Fatih Terim

GK	1	Petr Čech
RB	2	Zdeněk Grygera
CB	21	Tomáš Ujfaluši (c)	(yellow card) 90+4'
CB	22	David Rozehnal
LB	6	Marek Jankulovski
DM	4	Tomáš Galásek	(yellow card) 80'
CM	17	Marek Matějovský		(substituted off) 39'
CM	3	Jan Polák
RW	7	Libor Sionko		(substituted off) 85'
LW	20	Jaroslav Plašil		(substituted off) 80'
CF	9	Jan Koller
Substitutions:
MF	14	David Jarolím		(substituted on) 39'
DF	13	Michal Kadlec		(substituted on) 80'
FW	11	Stanislav Vlček		(substituted on) 85'
Other disciplinary actions:
FW	15	Milan Baroš	(yellow card) 90+5'
Manager:
Karel Brückner

Man of the Match:
Nihat Kahveci (Turkey)

Assistant referees:
Stefan Wittberg (Sweden)
Henrik Andrén (Sweden)
Fourth official:
Grzegorz Gilewski (Poland)
Reserve assistant referee:
Jan Petter Randen (Norway)

== See also ==
- Czech Republic at the UEFA European Championship
- Portugal at the UEFA European Championship
- Switzerland at the UEFA European Championship
- Turkey at the UEFA European Championship
