= Václav Svěrkoš =

Czech footballer (born 1983)

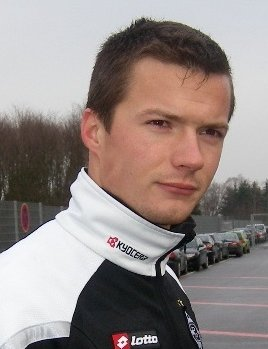
- Svěrkoš with Borussia Mönchengladbach in January 2007

Personal information
- Date of birth: 1 November 1983 (age 42)
- Place of birth: Třinec, Czechoslovakia
- Height: 1.84 m (6 ft 0 in)
- Position: Striker

Youth career
- 1990–1998: Frýdek-Místek
- 1998–2001: Baník Ostrava

Senior career*
Years	Team	Apps	(Gls)
2001–2003	Baník Ostrava	48	(14)
2003–2007	Borussia Mönchengladbach	76	(17)
2005–2006	→ Hertha BSC (loan)	10	(0)
2007	→ Austria Wien (loan)	7	(0)
2007–2008	Baník Ostrava	39	(23)
2009–2011	Sochaux	44	(10)
2011	→ Panionios (loan)	11	(1)
2011–2015	Baník Ostrava	36	(6)
Total		271	(71)

International career
1998–1999	Czech Republic U15	11	(3)
1999–2000	Czech Republic U16	20	(6)
2000–2001	Czech Republic U17	12	(5)
2000–2001	Czech Republic U18	7	(2)
2001–2002	Czech Republic U19	12	(6)
2002–2003	Czech Republic U20	4	(3)
2003–2005	Czech Republic U21	23	(8)
2008–2010	Czech Republic	11	(3)
- * Club domestic league appearances and goals

Václav Svěrkoš (Czech pronunciation: [ˈvaːtslaf ˈsvjɛrkoʃ]; born 1 November 1983) is a Czech former professional footballer who played as a striker. He was the opening scorer in the Euro 2008 tournament. Svěrkoš has played at professional football clubs in Germany, Austria, France and Greece, as well as the Czech Republic.

== Club career ==
=== Czech First League ===
Born in Třinec, Svěrkoš started his career at VP Frýdek-Místek. At the age of 14, he switched to Baník Ostrava, playing on U15 international for the Czech Republic already. Still eligible to feature for Baník's U19, Svěrkoš enjoyed his breakthrough in the Gambrinus liga, the best Czech division, for the Silesian city outfit after the departure of Milan Baroš. His record of 14 goals in just 26 first-team appearances for Ostrava and similar performances in the Czech Republic national under-21 football team got German club Borussia Mönchengladbach interested. Mönchengladbach had been unable to extend the half-a-season loan of Chelsea's Mikael Forssell, the team's top scorer in 2002–2003, in those times and regarded Svěrkoš a potential long-term replacement for the Finland international.

=== Bundesliga ===
A stuttering start to life in Bundesliga under Ewald Lienen, Svěrkoš took advantage of a change of manager at the club and he was able to end up the team's top scorer in 2003–2004 with nine goals in 31 Bundesliga matches. His most notable contribution came halfway through that campaign when he netted a hat-trick in Mönchengladbach's win over Champions League participant VfB Stuttgart (4–2) in the last 16 of the German Cup competition.

A year later, Mönchengladbach only just avoided relegation in a season in which Svěrkoš netted seven goals for them, his ongoing presence in the youth ranks for the Czech Republic awarded him the captaincy of the Czech U21 team. However, his third season under contract in German football turned out to be extremely problematic. Problems in his private life, followed by poor form, took the ground from under his feet and made him long for a change. Initially planning to go on loan to MSV Duisburg, UEFA Cup participants Hertha BSC became his interim club for the remainder of the season in December 2005.

Even this change of environment did not work for Svěrkoš and though he was facing uncertain times with Hertha BSC unwilling to buy him and Mönchengladbach, to whom he had to return to at the end of the season, seemingly willing to finally sell him to another club. Mönchengladbach's decision to part with manager Horst Köppel at the same time proved to be fortunate as one of the first decisions of Köppel's successor Jupp Heynckes was allowing him to stay on and make a fresh start at the club.

=== Returns to Ostrava ===
In the summer of 2007 Svěrkoš returned to Baník Ostrava. He found his form again after the winter break, scoring eleven goals in thirteen matches during the spring part of the league. He became the top scorer of the 2007–08 Czech First League, with 15 goals. This caused several clubs to be interested in signing him after UEFA Euro 2008, but Svěrkoš spent the rest of the year in Ostrava, in December 2008 he agreed to transfer to French Ligue 1 side FC Sochaux.

In August 2011 Svěrkoš returned to Baník Ostrava for the second time. On 16 March 2012, in a match against Sparta Prague he picked up a knee injury that sidelined him for several months. He returned to the team on 19 November 2012 in a match against 1. FC Slovácko, only to suffer the same injury again in the first half, which effectively ended his season.

== International career ==
Svěrkoš was called up to the Czech Republic national football team and made his debut in the friendly match against Lithuania on 27 May 2008. On 14 May 2008, it was announced that he would be part of the Czech squad for Euro 2008.

=== Euro 2008 ===
At Euro 2008 in Basel, Svěrkoš scored his first goal for his national side against Switzerland in the 71st minute of the opening match of the tournament on 7 June 2008. It also turned out to be the first goal of the tournament as the Czech Republic won the match 1–0. Despite this contribution, he did not play any part in the Czechs' two remaining matches in the tournament.

=== International goals ===
Scores and results list the Czech Republic's goal tally first

#	Date	Venue	Opponent	Score	Result	Competition
1.	7 June 2008	St. Jakob-Park, Basel, Switzerland	Switzerland	1–0	1–0	UEFA Euro 2008
2.	9 September 2009	Městský fotbalový stadion, Uherské Hradiště, Czech Republic	San Marino	4–0	7–0	2010 FIFA World Cup qualification
3.	9 September 2009	Městský fotbalový stadion, Uherské Hradiště, Czech Republic	San Marino	7–0	7–0	2010 FIFA World Cup qualification

== Honours ==
=== Club ===
Austria Wien

- Austrian Cup: 2006–07

=== Individual ===
- Czech First League top goalscorer: 2007–08
