= Emre Aşık =

Turkish footballer (born 1973)

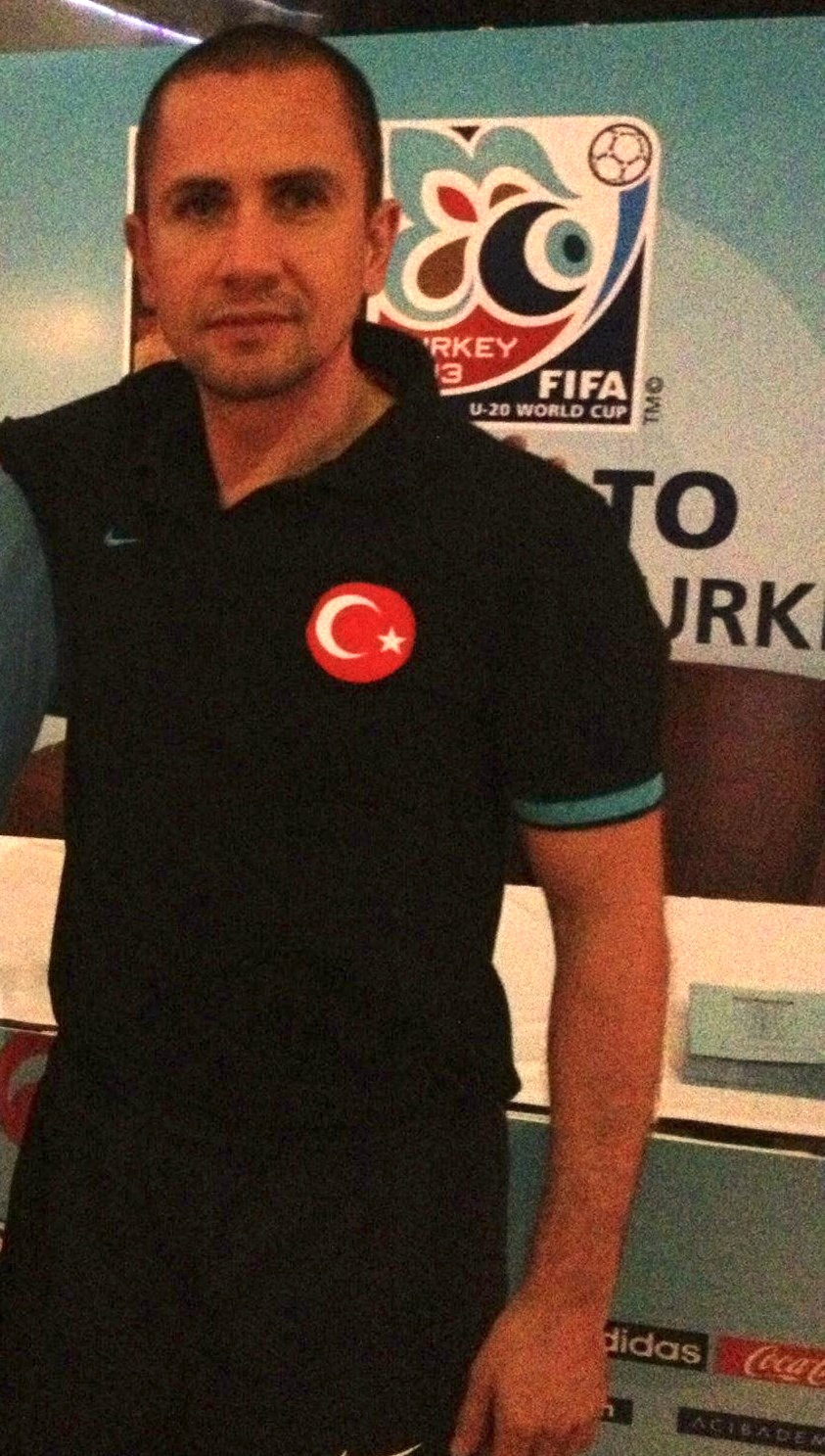

Personal information
- Date of birth: 13 December 1973 (age 52)
- Place of birth: Bursa, Turkey
- Height: 1.83 m (6 ft 0 in)
- Position: Centre-back

Senior career*
| Years | Team | Apps | (Gls) |
| –1992 | S. Filamentspor | 28 | (0) |
| 1992–1993 | Balıkesirspor | 27 | (7) |
| 1993–1996 | Fenerbahçe | 42 | (1) |
| 1996–2000 | İstanbulspor | 86 | (6) |
| 2000–2003 | Galatasaray | 63 | (1) |
| 2003–2006 | Beşiktaş | 32 | (2) |
| 2006–2010 | Galatasaray | 39 | (1) |
| 2007–2008 | → Ankaraspor (loan) | 26 | (1) |
| Total | | 291 | (19) |

International career
| 1992–1993 | Turkey U18 | 17 | (1) |
| 1993 | Turkey U20 | 3 | (0) |
| 1993–2010 | Turkey | 36 | (2) |
Medal record
Representing Turkey
Men's football
FIFA World Cup
| Third place | 2002 Korea/Japan |
UEFA European Championship
| Bronze medal – third place | 2008 Austria & Switzerland |
Mediterranean Games
| Gold medal – first place | 1993 Languedoc-Roussillon |
UEFA European Under-18 Championship
| Winner | 1992 Germany |
- * Club domestic league appearances and goals

Emre Aşık (born 13 December 1973) is a Turkish former international footballer. He played centre-back for several clubs in the Turkish Süper Lig, most notably, Galatasaray. Aşık began his career with Sönmez Filamentspor in the TFF Third League, and also played for Balıkesirspor, Fenerbahçe, İstanbulspor and Beşiktaş; he is one of thirteen footballers who has played for both Galatasaray and Beşiktaş.

Throughout his career, Aşık was known as a tough and controversial defender who received many cautions and expulsions, totaling 108 yellow cards and 13 red cards in league play. On the international level, Aşık was a member of the Turkey national team that finished third at the 2002 FIFA World Cup and semi-finalists at UEFA Euro 2008.

== Club career ==
=== Early years (1990–1993) ===
Aşık made his league debut with Sönmez Filamentspor on 27 May 1990 against Edremit Belediyespor. He started the match and was substituted out in the 86th minute. He did not make any more appearances that season, but became a fixture in the side the following season, making 27 appearances in the TFF Third League. Balıkesirspor transferred Aşık at the start of the 1992–93 season. He made his debut for the club on 30 August 1992 against Bucaspor, and scored his first professional goal ten days later against Muğlaspor. He went on to make 27 appearances in the TFF Second League.

=== Fenerbahçe (1993–1996) ===
At the start of the 1993–94 season, Aşık was transferred to the first of the Istanbul Big Three clubs he played for, Fenerbahçe. He made an instant impact with his new club, scoring the winning goal in the 109th minute of the Chancellor Cup final against Trabzonspor on 11 August 1993. He went on to make 23 league appearances for the club as they finished one point behind champions Galatasaray. The following season, Aşık saw less playing time, making 16 league appearances. He also played in the Chancellor Cup final, losing 4–3 to Galatasaray. Aşık found himself on the pitch four times during Fenerbahçe's league championship 1995–96 season, with all appearances coming in the first half.

=== İstanbulspor (1996–2000) ===
İstanbulspor signed the international defender at the start of the 1996–97 season, with Aşık making twelve appearances. Aşık became a fixture in the side, making 23 appearances the following season. He made 25 appearances in 1998–99 and 26 in 1999–2000, bringing his total to 86 appearances. Aşık also scored six goals for the club, with all six coming in his last season, 1999–2000.

=== Galatasaray (2000–2003) ===
Following their UEFA Cup win in 1999–2000, Galatasaray signed Aşık to a three-year contract. The Turkish international featured 17 times for the Lions in his first season, helping the club to a second-place finish. Aşık was also recalled to the Turkey national team, earning his first cap since 1995. His second season with the club proved to be more successful, making 27 appearances en route to the club's 15 league title. At the end of the season, Aşık was selected to participate in the 2002 FIFA World Cup. He made seventeen appearances for the club the following season.

=== Beşiktaş (2003–2006) ===
After winning a Süper Lig title and an UEFA Super Cup with Galatasaray, Aşık signed a three-year contract with rivals Beşiktaş. In his first season with the club, Aşık earned the nickname "the hero of Stamford Bridge" after putting in a performance to help Beşiktaş defeat Chelsea two to nil on 1 October 2003. He contributed one goal in 23 league appearances for the Black Eagles as they finished third. Aşık was unable to find the pitch often the following season, making nine appearances before being transferred mid-season.

=== Return to Galatasaray (2006–2010) ===
Aşık returned to Galatasaray in February 2006 after making 32 appearances for Beşiktaş in three seasons, signing a one-year contract. He made 12 league appearances in his first season back, and was loaned out to Ankaraspor the following season. In his only season with the Ankara-based club, Aşık made 26 appearances and scored one goal. His performances earned him a selection to the UEFA Euro 2008 squad by Fatih Terim. Aşık returned to Galatasaray the following season, with the team winning a Turkish Super Cup title. Marred by injuries during his twilight years, Aşık made 24 appearances over his last two seasons before deciding to hang up his boots. He finished with 343 total appearances and 19 goals scored.

== International career ==
Aşık holds the distinction of being a part of the two most successful Turkey squads: third place at the 2002 FIFA World Cup, and a semi-final finish at UEFA Euro 2008. Aşık began his international career with the Turkey U-18 team. He made 17 appearances for the team from 1992 to 1993. He was also part the Turkey U-20 squad for the 1993 FIFA World Youth Championship. He played in the three group stage matches, but Turkey did not advance to the knockout stage. Aşık, along with former Galatasaray teammate Okan Buruk, received a farewell match when Turkey faced off against the Czech Republic in a friendly on 22 May 2010. Aşık started the match, marking his 36th cap. He was substituted out of the match in the ninth minute with Buruk.

=== 2002 FIFA World Cup ===
Aşık was picked for the squad after winning the Süper Lig with Galatasaray. He did not see any action in the opening match against Brazil, but started their second match against Costa Rica. Against China PR, Aşık found himself in the starting eleven once more. He picked up his second yellow card in as many matches, suspending him from participation in Turkey's first knockout round match against Japan. He did not see any action during the rest of the campaign as Turkey finished third, the highest finish in team history.

=== UEFA Euro 2008 ===
Having spent a season on loan at Ankaraspor, Aşık was chosen as a reserve defender behind starters Servet Çetin and Gökhan Zan. However, following an injury to Zan, Aşık was slotted into the first eleven for the team's group stage match against Switzerland. After playing the entirety of the match in a two to one goal victory for Turkey, Aşık was benched in favor of Emre Güngör. Güngör also suffered an injury, and Aşık was given the starting job again. Aşık received a yellow card against Croatia, his second of the tournament, ruling him out of the semi-final tie against Germany. Turkey went on to lose 3–2, but still achieved their most successful campaign in the European Championships; a semi-final finish.

== Career statistics ==
=== Club ===
Appearances and goals by club, season and competition
| Club | Season | League | | National cup | | League cup (Note: Includes Atatürk Cup and Chancellor Cup.) | | Europe | | Total | |
| Club | Season | Apps | Goals | Apps | Goals | Apps | Goals | Apps | Goals | Apps | Goals |
|---|---|---|---|---|---|---|---|---|---|---|---|
| S. Filamentspor | 1990–91 | 1 | 0 | 0 | 0 | – | | – | | 1 | 0 |
| S. Filamentspor | 1991–92 | 27 | 0 | 1 | 0 | – | | – | | 28 | 0 |
| S. Filamentspor | Total | 28 | 0 | 1 | 0 | 0 | 0 | 0 | 0 | 28 | 0 |
| Balıkesirspor | 1992–93 | 27 | 7 | 1 | 0 | – | | – | | 28 | 7 |
| Fenerbahçe | 1993–94 | 22 | 0 | 2 | 0 | 1 | 1 | – | | 25 | 1 |
| Fenerbahçe | 1994–95 | 16 | 1 | 3 | 2 | 1 | 0 | – | | 20 | 3 |
| Fenerbahçe | 1995–96 | 4 | 0 | 1 | 0 | – | | – | | 5 | 0 |
| Fenerbahçe | Total | 42 | 1 | 6 | 2 | 1 | 0 | 0 | 0 | 50 | 4 |
| İstanbulspor | 1996–97 | 12 | 0 | 2 | 0 | – | | – | | 14 | 0 |
| İstanbulspor | 1997–98 | 23 | 0 | 4 | 0 | – | | – | | 27 | 0 |
| İstanbulspor | 1998–99 | 25 | 0 | 3 | 0 | – | | – | | 28 | 0 |
| İstanbulspor | 1999–00 | 26 | 6 | 1 | 0 | – | | – | | 27 | 6 |
| İstanbulspor | Total | 86 | 6 | 10 | 0 | 0 | 0 | 0 | 0 | 96 | 6 |
| Galatasaray | 2000–01 | 19 | 1 | 2 | 1 | 1 | 0 | – | | 22 | 2 |
| Galatasaray | 2001–02 | 27 | 0 | 1 | 0 | – | | – | | 28 | 0 |
| Galatasaray | 2002–03 | 17 | 0 | 2 | 0 | – | | 4 | 0 | 23 | 0 |
| Galatasaray | Total | 63 | 1 | 6 | 1 | 1 | 0 | 4 | 0 | 73 | 2 |
| Beşiktaş | 2003–04 | 23 | 1 | 1 | 0 | – | | 5 | 0 | 29 | 1 |
| Beşiktaş | 2004–05 | 9 | 1 | 0 | 0 | – | | 4 | 0 | 13 | 1 |
| Beşiktaş | 2005–06 | 0 | 0 | 0 | 0 | – | | 0 | 0 | 0 | 0 |
| Beşiktaş | Total | 32 | 2 | 1 | 0 | 0 | 0 | 9 | 0 | 42 | 2 |
| Galatasaray | 2005–06 | 3 | 0 | 0 | 0 | – | | – | | 3 | 0 |
| Galatasaray | 2006–07 | 12 | 1 | 1 | 0 | – | | 1 | 0 | 14 | 1 |
| Galatasaray | Total | 15 | 1 | 1 | 0 | 0 | 0 | 1 | 0 | 17 | 1 |
| Ankaraspor (loan) | 2007–08 | 26 | 1 | 1 | 0 | – | | – | | 27 | 1 |
| Galatasaray | 2008–09 | 18 | 0 | 3 | 0 | – | | 9 | 1 | 30 | 1 |
| Galatasaray | 2009–10 | 6 | 0 | 2 | 0 | – | | 5 | 0 | 13 | 0 |
| Galatasaray | Total | 24 | 0 | 5 | 0 | 0 | 0 | 14 | 1 | 43 | 1 |
| Career total | | 343 | 19 | 32 | 3 | 3 | 1 | 28 | 1 | 406 | 24 |

=== International ===
Appearances and goals by national team and year
| National team | Year | Apps | Goals |
|---|---|---|---|
| Turkey | 1993 | 2 | 0 |
| Turkey | 1994 | 1 | 1 |
| Turkey | 1995 | 6 | 0 |
| Turkey | 2001 | 3 | 1 |
| Turkey | 2002 | 8 | 0 |
| Turkey | 2003 | 1 | 0 |
| Turkey | 2007 | 5 | 0 |
| Turkey | 2008 | 6 | 0 |
| Turkey | 2009 | 3 | 0 |
| Turkey | 2010 | 1 | 0 |
| Total | | 36 | 2 |

Scores and results list Turkey's goal tally first, score column indicates score after each Aşık goal.

| No. | Date | Venue | Opponent | Score | Result | Competition |
|---|---|---|---|---|---|---|
| 1 | 15 November 1995 | Råsunda Stadium, Stockholm, Sweden | Sweden | 1–1 | 1–2 | UEFA Euro 1996 qualifying |
| 2 | 6 October 2001 | Stadionul Republican, Chişinău, Moldova | Moldova | 0–1 | 0–3 | 2002 FIFA World Cup qualification |

== Honours ==
Fenerbahçe

- Süper Lig: 1995–96

Galatasaray

- Süper Lig: 2001–02, 2005-06
- Turkish Super Cup: 2008

Turkey

- FIFA World Cup third place: 2002
- UEFA European Championship semi-finals: 2008

Order

- Turkish State Medal of Distinguished Service
