= Hakan Yakin =

Swiss footballer (born 1977)

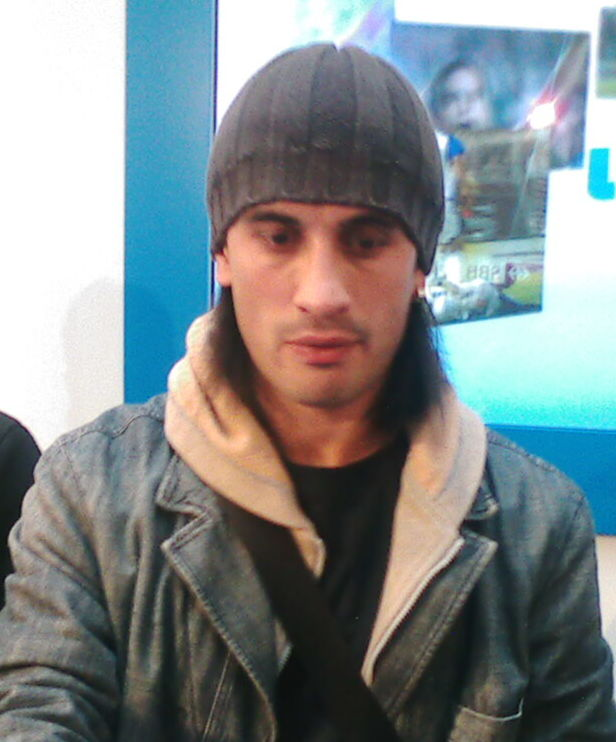
- Yakin in 2006

Personal information
- Full name: Hakan Yakin
- Date of birth: 22 February 1977 (age 49)
- Place of birth: Basel, Switzerland
- Height: 1.80 m (5 ft 11 in)
- Positions: Second striker; attacking midfielder

Youth career
- 1984–1994: Concordia Basel

Senior career*
| Years | Team | Apps | (Gls) |
| 1994–1995 | Concordia Basel | | |
| 1995–1997 | Basel | 67 | (14) |
| 1997–1998 | Grasshoppers | 11 | (1) |
| 1998–1999 | → St. Gallen (loan) | 35 | (8) |
| 1999–2001 | Grasshoppers | 54 | (22) |
| 2001–2003 | Basel | 67 | (30) |
| 2003 | Paris Saint-Germain | 0 | (0) |
| 2004 | Basel | 6 | (3) |
| 2004–2005 | VfB Stuttgart | 9 | (0) |
| 2004–2005 | → Galatasaray (loan) | 2 | (0) |
| 2005–2008 | Young Boys | 84 | (40) |
| 2008–2009 | Al-Gharafa | 15 | (5) |
| 2009–2011 | Luzern | 79 | (26) |
| 2012–2013 | Bellinzona | 32 | (13) |
| Total | | 455 | (162) |

International career
| 2000–2011 | Switzerland | 87 | (20) |

Managerial career
- 2014–2015: Zug 94
- 2021: Schaffhausen (caretaker)
- 2022–2023: Schaffhausen
- 2023–2024: İstanbulspor
- 2025–2026: Schaffhausen
- * Club domestic league appearances and goals

Hakan Yakin (Turkish: Hakan Yakın; born 22 February 1977) is a Swiss professional football manager and former player who is the head coach of Swiss Challenge League side FC Schaffhausen. He spent the majority of his playing career as a forward or attacking midfielder in the Swiss top flight with brief forays abroad (in France, Germany, Turkey and Qatar). He represented Switzerland national team for eleven years, garnering 87 caps and scoring 20 goals.

== Early and personal life ==
Hakan Yakin was born on 22 February 1977 in Basel, Switzerland, to Turkish parents. He grew up and went to school in suburban Münchenstein, Basel-Landschaft, just outside Basel, and close to the borders of France and Germany. He is the younger brother of international football player Murat Yakin who is a former player with, and currently head coach of, the Switzerland national team. His elder half-brother Ertan Irizik is also a former football professional. Yakin's surname is based on the Turkish word Yakın (meaning close, adjacent).

== Club career ==
As a child, Yakin played in the youth teams of his local side Concordia Basel. He signed his first professional contract with hometown club Basel in January 1995. He played his League debut for Basel on 12 April 1995 in the 1994–95 season in the match against Lausanne. He was brought on in the 60th minute as replacement for Alexandre Rey and with his first touch of the ball, just 18 seconds later, he scored the goal to make it 3–0, a header (final score 5–0).

After two and a half years in Basel, he transferred to Grasshoppers, with manager Christian Gross, but could not establish himself, making most of his appearances as substitute, and he was loaned to St. Gallen for the second half of the 1997–98 season. He moved immediately into the starting eleven and so the loan was prolonged, before he returned to the Grasshoppers.

During January 2001, he transferred back to Basel. At the end of the 2001–02 season Yakin won the national Double with Basel and a year later won the Swiss Cup again. He recalls the 2002–03 Champions League Group B match on 12 November 2002 against Liverpool in St. Jakob-Park as the "match of his life". The game was drawn 3–3 and Yakin gave all three assists as Basel cruised to a 3–0 half-time lead as they qualified, one point above Liverpool, for the 2002–03 UEFA Champions League second group stage.

Curiosity during the championship play-off round of their 2002–03 season was, that in the home match in the St. Jakob-Park on 19 April 2003, Yakin had a good game and scored a perfect hat-trick during the first half of the game as Basel won 3–0 against Young Boys. Yakin showed his other side in the return match in the Stadion Neufeld in Bern one week later. As YB went a goal up he lost his temper and kicked the ball away, thus collecting a yellow card. Just ten minutes later he committed a rough foul and collecting a second yellow, thus yellow/red, to be sent-off.

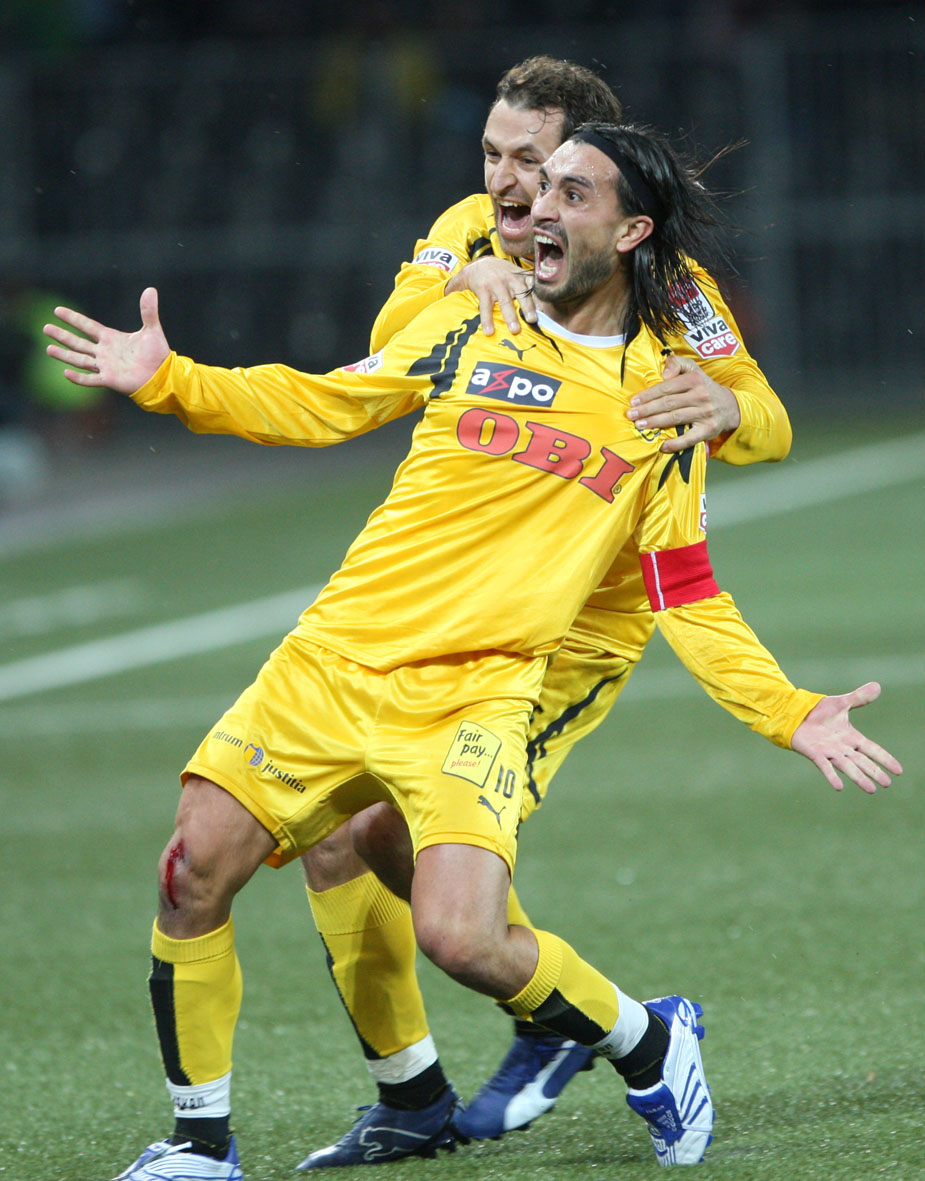
Yakin celebrating a goal for Young Boys in 2008 with Thomas Häberli

His career was then overshadowed by some trouble regarding his club transfers, as his engagements outside Switzerland (Paris Saint-Germain, VfB Stuttgart, and Galatasaray) were not accompanied by luck. In 2005–06, Yakin returned to Switzerland, joining BSC Young Boys. In July 2008, Yakin signed a contract with Qatar champions Al-Gharafa, for a salary of around €2.5 million per year.

In March 2009, it was reported that Yakin had been training with the Grasshoppers Under-21 side, coached by his brother Murat, in a bid to get fit. Yakin then signed a contract on 25 June 2009 in his homeland Switzerland with FC Luzern, running through to 30 June 2011. In summer 2011 his brother Murat became his manager at FC Luzern.

During the mid-season break in January 2012 Yakin transferred to Bellinzona in the Challenge League, the second tier of Swiss football. He played his team debut on 26 February in the 2–0 home win against Stade Nyonnais. He scored his first two goals for the club in the 3–2 away win against Aarau on 9 April 2012.

== International career ==
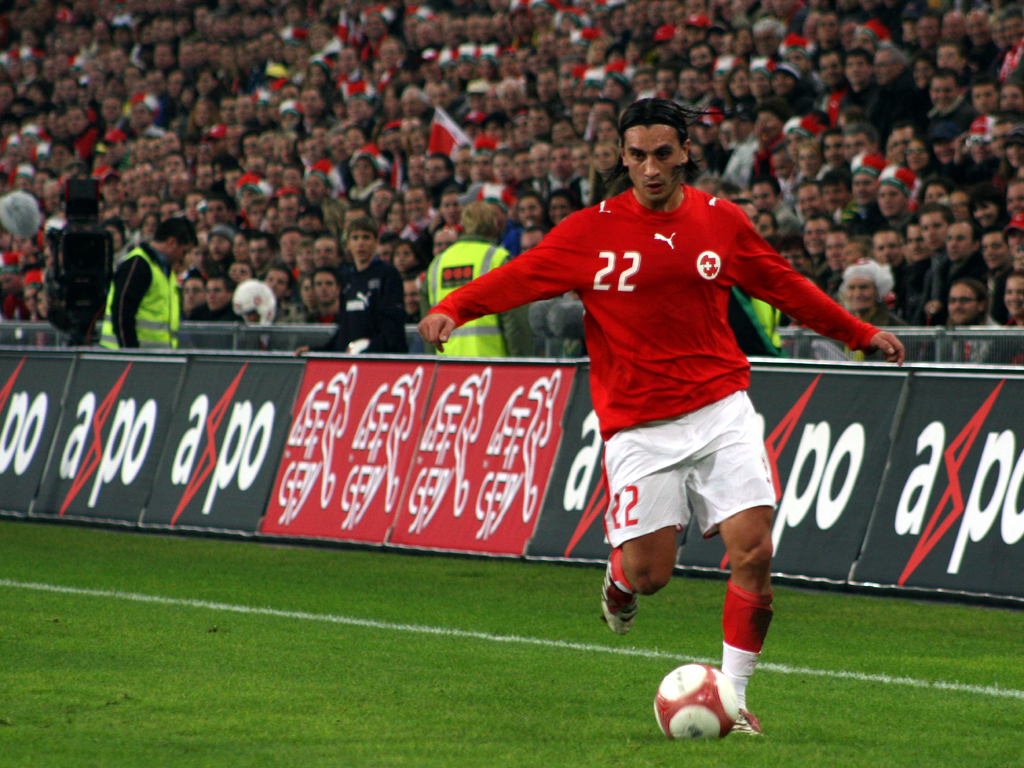
Yakin in Bern, Switzerland, in 2006

Yakin was capped 87 times for Switzerland, the first coming in 2000. He was offered Turkish nationality before being called up to the Swiss squad, but turned it down for personal reasons. He has played in UEFA Euro 2004, UEFA Euro 2008 and both the 2006 FIFA World Cup and the 2010 FIFA World Cup with his country.

On 11 June 2008, he scored the opening goal in the 32nd minute of Switzerland's second Euro 2008 Group A match against Turkey, giving them a 1–0 lead and he refused to celebrate after the goal, out of respect for his family's birth country. However, he missed another chance shortly afterward as Turkey scored two second-half goals, resulting in Switzerland's becoming the first team to be mathematically eliminated from their own tournament within five days of its beginning. However, in Switzerland's final group match against Portugal on 15 June, Yakin added two second-half goals, the second a penalty kick, to secure their first ever win at the UEFA European Championship, 2–0. Yakin finished the tournament as joint-second highest goalscorer with Lukas Podolski, Roman Pavlyuchenko, and Semih Şentürk with three goals each, behind David Villa's four goals.

Under new national team coach, Ottmar Hitzfeld, Yakin participated in seven of Switzerland's ten qualifying matches for the 2010 FIFA World Cup, starting twice and making five substitute appearances, scoring one goal in Switzerland's opening qualifier against Israel. He announced his retirement from the Switzerland national team on 4 October 2011.

== Coaching career ==
He was hired as an assistant coach to his brother Murat at Schaffhausen in 2019. After Murat was hired as the manager of the Switzerland national football team in August 2021, Hakan served as a caretaker manager for Schaffhausen for 3 games. He returned to being assistant coach for the remainder of the season under Martin Andermatt. Together, they coached Schaffhausen to a second place finish in the 2021–22 Swiss Challenge League, but missed out on promotion in the promotion playoff.

On 4 June 2022, he was confirmed as the new head coach at Schaffhausen, as Andermatt's contract was not renewed. This appointment is contingent on Yakin entering the course to receive his UEFA Pro Licence. As a result, he was briefly removed from the sidelines, but was later confirmed as head coach on 5 September 2022. On 20 May 2023, he departed Schaffhausen, following a 2–0 loss to Aarau. Due to middling results in his first season as head coach, the club had decided not to renew his contract for the coming season. For personal reasons, Yakin stepped down from his post for the last two games of the season.

On 4 March 2025, he returned to the sideline at Schaffhausen, replacing Ciriaco Sforza with immediate effect.

== Career statistics ==
=== Club ===
| Club performance | | | League | | Cup | | Continental | | Total | |
| Season | Club | League | Apps | Goals | Apps | Goals | Apps | Goals | Apps | Goals |
| Switzerland | | | League | | Schweizer Cup | | Continental | | Total | |
|---|---|---|---|---|---|---|---|---|---|---|
| 1994–95 | Basel | Super League | 9 | 5 | - | - | - | - | 9 | 5 |
| 1995–96 | Basel | Super League | 34 | 6 | - | - | 4 | 1 | 38 | 7 |
| 1996–97 | Basel | Super League | 24 | 3 | - | - | 2 | 2 | 26 | 5 |
| 1997–98 | Grasshopper | Super League | 11 | 1 | - | - | - | - | 11 | 1 |
| 1997–98 | St. Gallen | Super League | 14 | 1 | - | - | - | - | 14 | 1 |
| 1998–99 | St. Gallen | Super League | 21 | 7 | - | - | 1 | 0 | 22 | 7 |
| 1998–99 | Grasshopper | Super League | 6 | 2 | - | - | - | - | 6 | 2 |
| 1999–00 | Grasshopper | Super League | 29 | 10 | - | - | 4 | 2 | 33 | 12 |
| 2000–01 | Grasshopper | Super League | 19 | 10 | - | - | - | - | 19 | 10 |
| 2000–01 | Basel | Super League | 11 | 4 | - | - | - | - | 11 | 4 |
| 2001–02 | Basel | Super League | 27 | 13 | - | - | 7 | 3 | 34 | 16 |
| 2002–03 | Basel | Super League | 29 | 13 | 2 | 1 | 16 | 3 | 47 | 17 |
| 2003–04 | Basel | Super League | 6 | 3 | 1 | 0 | 4 | 1 | 11 | 4 |
| Germany | | | League | | DFB-Pokal | | Continental | | Total | |
| 2003–04 | VfB Stuttgart | Bundesliga | 8 | 0 | - | - | - | - | 8 | 0 |
| 2004–05 | VfB Stuttgart | Bundesliga | 1 | 0 | 2 | 0 | - | - | 3 | 0 |
| Turkey | | | League | | Turkish Cup | | Continental | | Total | |
| 2004–05 | Galatasaray | Super League | 2 | 0 | - | - | - | - | 2 | 0 |
| Switzerland | | | League | | Schweizer Cup | | Continental | | Total | |
| 2005–06 | Young Boys | Super League | 21 | 6 | 2 | 0 | 2 | 1 | 25 | 7 |
| 2006–07 | Young Boys | Super League | 31 | 10 | 4 | 1 | 2 | 1 | 37 | 12 |
| 2007–08 | Young Boys | Super League | 32 | 24 | 4 | 0 | 3 | 0 | 39 | 24 |
| Qatar | | | League | | Cup | | Continental | | Total | |
| 2008–09 | Al-Gharafa Sports Club | Qatar Stars League | 15 | 5 | - | - | - | - | 15 | 5 |
| Switzerland | | | League | | Schweizer Cup | | Continental | | Total | |
| 2009–10 | FC Luzern | Super League | 29 | 10 | 4 | 2 | - | - | 33 | 12 |
| 2010–11 | FC Luzern | Super League | 32 | 12 | 3 | 0 | 2 | 0 | 37 | 12 |
| 2011–12 | FC Luzern | Super League | 18 | 4 | 2 | 1 | - | - | 20 | 5 |
| 2011–12 | AC Bellinzona | Challenge League | 14 | 6 | - | - | - | - | 14 | 6 |
| 2012–13 | AC Bellinzona | Challenge League | 18 | 7 | - | - | - | - | 18 | 7 |
| Total | Switzerland | | 429 | 157 | 21 | 5 | 47 | 14 | 497 | 176 |
| Total | Germany | | 9 | 0 | 2 | 0 | - | - | 11 | 0 |
| Total | Turkey | | 2 | 0 | - | - | - | - | 2 | 0 |
| Total | Qatar | | 15 | 5 | - | - | - | - | 15 | 5 |
| Career total | | | 455 | 162 | 23 | 5 | 47 | 14 | 525 | 181 |

=== International goals ===
Scores and results list Switzerland's goal tally first.

| # | Date | Venue | Opponent | Score | Result | Competition |
|---|---|---|---|---|---|---|
| 1. | 19 February 2000 | Sultan Qaboos Sports Complex, Muscat | Oman | 4–1 | 4–1 | Friendly |
| 2. | 26 April 2000 | Fritz-Walter-Stadion, Kaiserslautern | Germany | 1–0 | 1–1 | Friendly |
| 3. | 16 August 2000 | Espenmoos, St. Gallen | Greece | 2–2 | 2–2 | Friendly |
| 4. | 15 August 2001 | Ernst-Happel-Stadion, Vienna | Austria | 2–1 | 2–1 | Friendly |
| 5. | 1 September 2001 | St. Jakob-Park, Basel | FR Yugoslavia | 1–0 | 1–2 | 2002 World Cup qualifier |
| 6. | 12 February 2002 | Makario Stadium, Nicosia | Cyprus | 1–1 | 1–1 | Friendly |
| 7. | 13 February 2002 | Tsirion Stadium, Limassol | Hungary | 2–0 | 2–1 | Friendly |
| 8. | 21 August 2002 | St. Jakob-Park, Basel | Austria | 1–1 | 3–2 | Friendly |
| 9. | 8 September 2002 | St. Jakob-Park, Basel | Georgia | 2–1 | 4–1 | Euro 2004 qualifier |
| 10. | 16 October 2002 | Lansdowne Road, Dublin | Republic of Ireland | 1–0 | 2–1 | Euro 2004 qualifier |
| 11. | 12 February 2003 | Nova Gorica Sports Park, Nova Gorica | Slovenia | 1–0 | 5–1 | Friendly |
| 12. | 11 October 2003 | St. Jakob-Park, Basel | Republic of Ireland | 1–0 | 2–0 | Euro 2004 qualifier |
| 13. | 28 April 2004 | Stade de Genève, Geneva | Slovenia | 2–1 | 2–1 | Friendly |
| 14. | 8 September 2004 | St. Jakob-Park, Basel | Republic of Ireland | 1–1 | 1–1 | 2006 World Cup qualifier |
| 15. | 13 October 2007 | Letzigrund, Zurich | Austria | 2–1 | 3–1 | Friendly |
| 16. | 11 June 2008 | St. Jakob-Park, Basel | Turkey | 1–0 | 1–2 | Euro 2008 |
| 17. | 15 June 2008 | St. Jakob-Park, Basel | Portugal | 1–0 | 2–0 | Euro 2008 |
| 18. | 15 June 2008 | St. Jakob-Park, Basel | Portugal | 2–0 | 2–0 | Euro 2008 |
| 19. | 20 August 2008 | Stade de Genève, Geneva | Cyprus | 2–0 | 4–1 | Friendly |
| 20. | 6 September 2008 | Ramat Gan Stadium, Ramat Gan | Israel | 1–0 | 2–2 | 2010 World Cup qualifier |

=== Managerial ===
As of 14 January 2024

Managerial record by team and tenure
| Team | Nat. | From | To | Record | | | | |
| Team | Nat. | From | To | G | W | D | L | Win % |
|---|---|---|---|---|---|---|---|---|
| Schaffhausen (Caretaker) | (Switzerland) | 12 August 2021 | 31 August 2021 | 3 | 2 | 1 | 0 | 66.67 |
| Schaffhausen | (Switzerland) | 4 September 2022 | 20 May 2023 | 29 | 9 | 6 | 14 | 31.03 |
| İstanbulspor | (Turkey) | 16 October 2023 | present | 13 | 2 | 2 | 9 | 15.38 |
| Total | | | | 45 | 13 | 9 | 23 | 28.89 |

== Honours ==
=== Club ===
Grasshoppers

- Swiss Super League: 2000–01

Basel

- Swiss Super League: 2001–02
- Swiss Cup: 2001–02, 2002–03
- Uhrencup: 2003

Galatasaray

- Turkish Cup: 2004–05

Young Boys

- Uhrencup: 2007

=== Individual ===
- Axpo Swiss Super League Player of the Year: 2003, 2008
- Swiss Super League top scorer: 2007–08 (24 goals)

== Notes and references ==
References
