= Peter Fröjdfeldt =

Swedish football referee

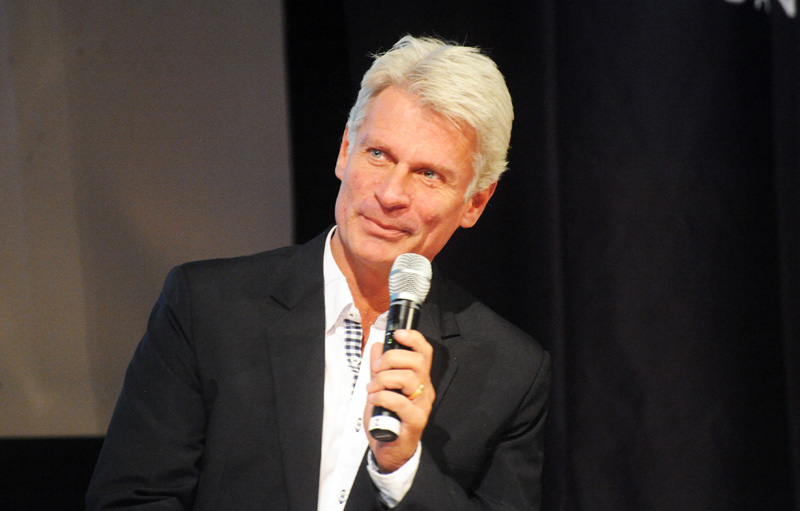
- Born: 14 November 1963 (age 62); Eskilstuna, Sweden
- Occupations: Football referee, stadium director
- Height: 1.80 m (5 ft 11 in)

Peter Fröjdfeldt (born 14 November 1963) is a former top Swedish football referee.

Fröjdfeldt was born in Eskilstuna. Originally a first division bandy player, he started refereeing in 1992 after his father-in-law asked him to referee a match in a minor league. He moved up to the highest Swedish league, the Allsvenskan in 1997, and obtained his FIFA badge in 2001. Fröjdfeldt has a friendly disposition while refereeing, and his refereeing style has been described as calm and allowing the game to flow.

A relative latecomer to international refereeing, he was in the shadows of fellow countryman and colleague Anders Frisk for many years until Frisk's abrupt retirement in 2005. He was voted best referee in Sweden in 2005, and also works as a stadium director outside refereeing, and enjoys family life and golf.

Fröjdfeldt officiated six games during the 2006 FIFA World Cup qualification in the European (UEFA) zone.

Fröjdfeldt was placed in charge of the 2008 UEFA Cup Final, one of the biggest appointments for a UEFA referee.

Fröjdfeldt was selected to referee at UEFA Euro 2008 in Switzerland and Austria, his first and only major tournament, as he would have passed the mandatory retirement age of 45 by the time of the 2010 FIFA World Cup.

At the tournament, Fröjdfeldt was the referee for a Group C game between Netherlands and Italy, a Group A game between Turkey and the Czech Republic and a quarter-final match between Portugal and Germany. He correctly awarded a goal from Dutch striker Ruud van Nistelrooy during the first game, despite protests from general football public. He sent off Turkey's goalkeeper Volkan Demirel near the end of the game for a push on opponent Jan Koller, a decision Turkey's coach Fatih Terim agreed with. For the final, he was the fourth official.

He retired internationally after reaching the mandatory retirement age of 45 in 2008.

Preceded by UEFA Cup Final 2007 (Switzerland) Massimo Busacca	UEFA Cup Final Referees; Final 2008 (Sweden) Peter Fröjdfeldt	Succeeded by UEFA Cup Final 2009 (Spain) Luis Medina Cantalejo
