= Johan Vonlanthen =

Swiss footballer (born 1986)

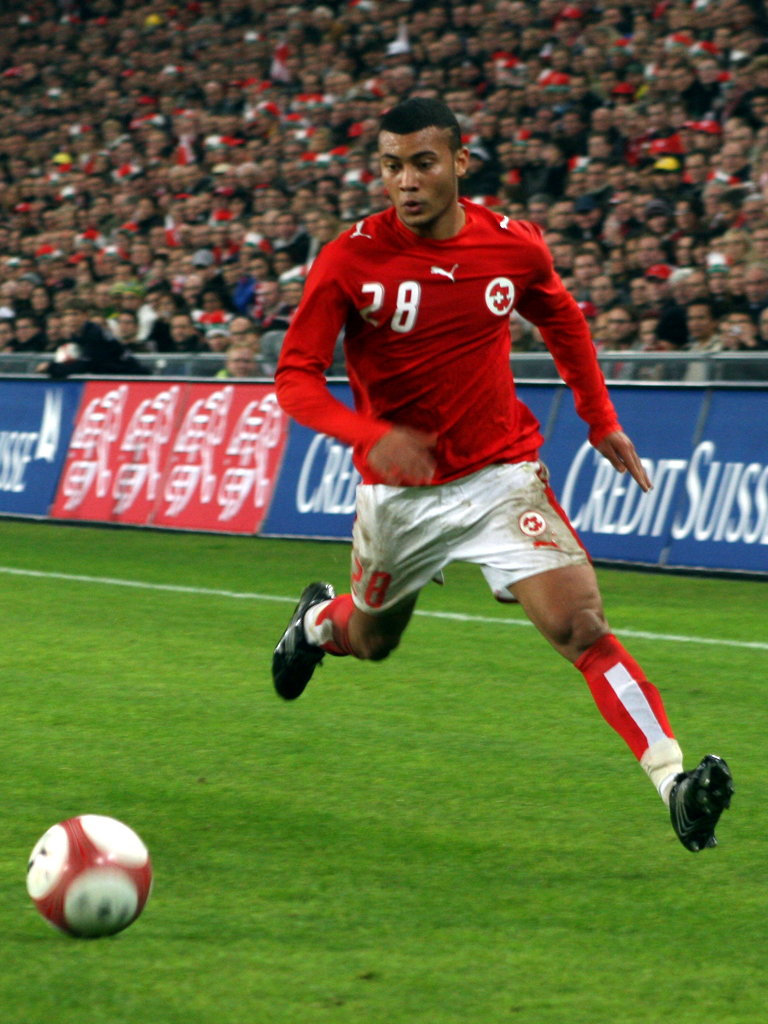
- Vonlanthen playing for Switzerland in 2006

Personal information
- Full name: Johan Jarlín Vonlanthen Benavídez
- Date of birth: 1 February 1986 (age 40)
- Place of birth: Santa Marta, Colombia
- Height: 1.75 m (5 ft 9 in)
- Position: Winger

Youth career
- 1998–1999: FC Flamatt
- 1999–2001: Young Boys

Senior career*
Years	Team	Apps	(Gls)
2001–2003	Young Boys	18	(2)
2003–2006	PSV	29	(5)
2005	→ Brescia (loan)	9	(0)
2005–2006	→ NAC Breda (loan)	32	(6)
2006–2011	Red Bull Salzburg	85	(11)
2009–2010	→ Zürich (loan)	27	(10)
2011–2012	Itagüí	5	(0)
2012	Wohlen	0	(0)
2013–2014	Grasshoppers	5	(0)
2014	→ Schaffhausen (loan)	17	(2)
2014–2016	Servette	32	(10)
2016–2018	Wil	66	(11)
Total		325	(57)

International career
2001	Switzerland U-15	4	(1)
2004	Switzerland U-21	3	(1)
2004–2010	Switzerland	40	(7)
- * Club domestic league appearances and goals

Johan Vonlanthen Benavídez (born 1 February 1986) is a former professional footballer who played as a winger. Born in Colombia, he opted to play for Switzerland, for whom he became eligible through his Swiss-born stepfather.

Having made his Swiss Super League debut BSC Young Boys at the age of 16, he moved to PSV in 2003.

He initially announced the end of his active career in May 2012. He came back out of retirement in May 2013 and signed for Grasshoppers in June. He retired in August 2018 after two years with FC Wil.

== Club career ==
=== Early career ===
Vonlanthen played as a junior for BSC Young Boys in Switzerland. In the 2001–02 season, he made his debut as a 16-year-old in the Swiss Super League starting eight games and appearing once as a substitute. In the summer of 2003, he was transferred to the Dutch Eredivisie club PSV Eindhoven. On 21 June 2004, Vonlanthen became the youngest goalscorer when he scored for the Switzerland national team against France in Coimbra, Portugal at the age of 18 years and 141 days old. He made a good initial impression and helped PSV qualify for the UEFA Champions League. After a good first season, he began to lose form and as a consequence was loaned out to Italian side Brescia Calcio for the last six months of the 2004–05 season. He was again loaned out to NAC Breda for the 2005–06 season.

=== Red Bull Salzburg ===
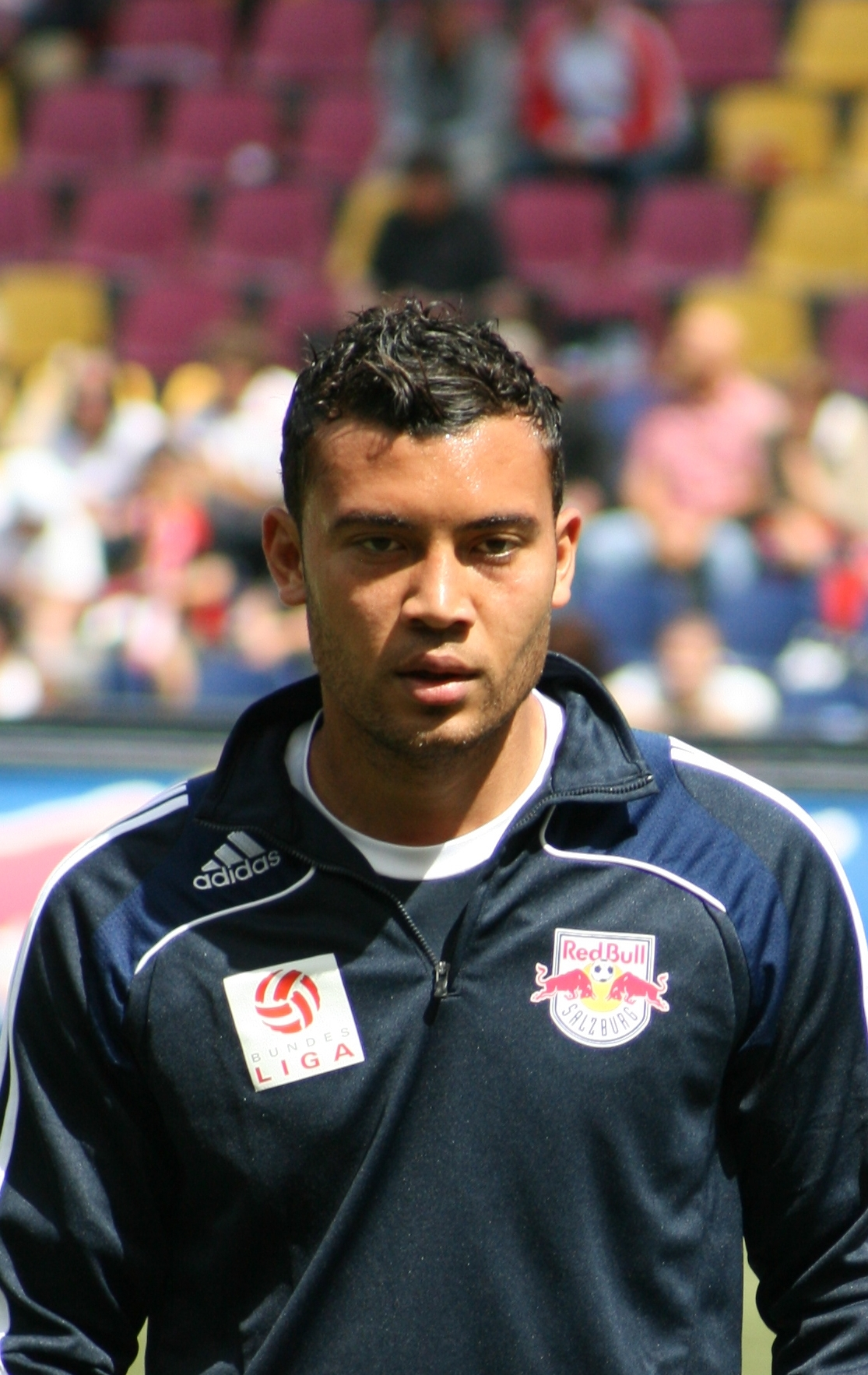
Vonlanthen at Salzburg

At the start of the 2006–07 season, Vonlanthen transferred to Red Bull Salzburg in the Austrian Bundesliga.

On 13 July 2009, FC Zürich signed the Swiss forward on a season long loan deal. The move was not made permanent, and Vonlanthen returned to Salzburg for the start of the 2010–11 season.

=== Itagüí, Wohlen and initial retirement ===
Vonlanthen moved to Colombian Primera División side Itagüí in August 2011.

On 30 May 2012, Vonlanthen announced his retirement at age 26. According to him, he 'could not face the prospect of undergoing a knee operation'.

=== Return ===
On 13 June 2013, Vonlanthen came out of retirement to join Grasshoppers, signing a one-year deal with an option for a further two years.

On 27 December 2013, Vonlanthen was loaned out to Swiss second division side Schaffhausen, due to a lack of playing time at Grasshoppers.

He retired in August 2018 after two years with FC Wil.

== International career ==
Vonlanthen's stepfather is a Swiss national, giving him the right to play for that country.

On 6 June 2004, Vonlanthen made his senior debut for the Switzerland national team against Liechtenstein. He came on as a substitute in the 81st minute to replace Alexander Frei. Switzerland went on to beat Liechtenstein 1–0.

At UEFA Euro 2004, Vonlanthen became the second youngest player to play in the tournament when he came on as a substitute against England. On 21 June 2004, Vonlanthen became the youngest scorer ever in the European Championships when he equalised against France, beating Wayne Rooney's record – which had only been set four days before – by three months. However his record was beaten by Lamine Yamal on 9 July 2024 during UEFA Euro 2024 semifinals against France.

Since the European Championships in Portugal, Vonlanthen managed to maintain a regular position in the national team and as well as playing frequently in the under 21s side. He was part of the squad that very narrowly lost out to Spain on a place in the 2009 European Championships. He had scored the equaliser in the first leg in a 2–1 win but the Spanish came back to win 3–1 in the second leg and 4–3 on aggregate.

Vonlanthen was called up to the Swiss squad to play in 2006 FIFA World Cup, but was unable to participate due to a hamstring injury. He was also called up for UEFA Euro 2008.

== Personal life ==
Vonlanthen is member of the Seventh-day Adventist Church.

== Career statistics ==
=== Club ===
Appearances and goals by club, season and competition
Club	Season	League			Cup		Continental		Other		Total		Ref.
Club	Season	Division	Apps	Goals	Apps	Goals	Apps	Goals	Apps	Goals	Apps	Goals	Ref.
Young Boys	2001–02	Swiss Super League (Note: "Nationalliga A" until 2003)	0	0			0	0	8 (Note: Appearances in Swiss Super League playoffs)	1	8	1	
Young Boys	2002–03	Swiss Super League	16	1			0	0	11	3	27	4	
Young Boys	2003–04	Swiss Super League	2	1			0	0	0	0	2	1	
Young Boys	Total		18	2	0	0	0	0	19	4	37	6	–
PSV Eindhoven	2003–04	Eredivisie	19	3	2	0	3	0	–		22	3	
PSV Eindhoven	2004–05	Eredivisie	10	2	0	0	2	0	–		12	2	
PSV Eindhoven	Total		29	5	2	0	5	0	0	0	36	5	–
Brescia (loan)	2004–05	Serie A	9	0	0	0	0	0	–		9	0	
NAC Breda (loan)	2005–06	Eredivisie	32	6	7	5	0	0	4 (Note: Appearances in Eredivisie playoffs)	1	43	12	
Red Bull Salzburg	2006–07	Austrian Bundesliga	35	5	3	0	4	1	–		41	6	
Red Bull Salzburg	2007–08	Austrian Bundesliga	20	3	0	0	5	0	–		25	3	
Red Bull Salzburg	2008–09	Austrian Bundesliga	29	3	1	0	4	0	–		34	3	
Red Bull Salzburg	2010–11	Austrian Bundesliga	1	0	0	0	0	0	–		1	0	
Red Bull Salzburg	Total		85	11	4	0	13	1	0	0	102	12	–
Zürich (loan)	2009–10	Swiss Super League	27	10	2	4	10	3	–		39	17	
Itagüí	2011	Liga Postobón	5	0	0	0	0	0	1 (Note: Appearances in Categoría Primera A playoffs)	0	6	0	
Grasshoppers	2013–14	Swiss Super League	5	0	0	0	3	0	–		8	0	
Schaffhausen (loan)	2013–14	Swiss Challenge League	17	2	0	0	–		–		17	2	
Servette	2014–15	Swiss Challenge League	32	10	1	1	–		–		33	11	
FC Wil	2015–16	Swiss Challenge League	10	0	0	0	–		–		10	0	
FC Wil	2016–17	Swiss Challenge League	32	6	1	0	–		–		33	6	
FC Wil	2017–18	Swiss Challenge League	24	5	2	2	–		–		26	7	
FC Wil	Total		66	11	3	2	0	0	0	0	69	13	–
Career total			325	57	19	12	31	4	24	5	399	78	–

=== International ===
Appearances and goals by national team and year
National team	Year	Apps	Goals
Switzerland	2004	7	5
Switzerland	2005	9	0
Switzerland	2006	2	0
Switzerland	2007	8	0
Switzerland	2008	10	2
Switzerland	2009	4	0
Total		40	7

Scores and results list Switzerland's goal tally first, score column indicates score after each Vonlanthen goal.

List of international goals scored by Johan Vonlanthen
No.	Date	Venue	Opponent	Score	Result	Competition	Ref.
1	21 June 2004	Estádio Cidade de Coimbra, Coimbra, Portugal	France	1–1	1-3	UEFA Euro 2004	
2	4 September 2004	St. Jakob-Park, Basel, Switzerland	Faroe Islands	1–0	6–0	2006 FIFA World Cup qualification	
3	4 September 2004	St. Jakob-Park, Basel, Switzerland	Faroe Islands	2–0	6–0	2006 FIFA World Cup qualification	
4	4 September 2004	St. Jakob-Park, Basel, Switzerland	Faroe Islands	6–0	6–0	2006 FIFA World Cup qualification	
5	9 October 2004	Ramat Gan Stadium, Ramat Gan, Israel	Israel	2–1	2–2	2006 FIFA World Cup qualification	
6	30 May 2008	Kybunpark, St. Gallen, Switzerland	Liechtenstein	3–0	3–0	Friendly	
7	20 August 2008	Stade de Genève, Lancy, Switzerland	Cyprus	4–1	4–1	Friendly	
