= UEFA Euro 2008 Group D =

Football tournament group stage

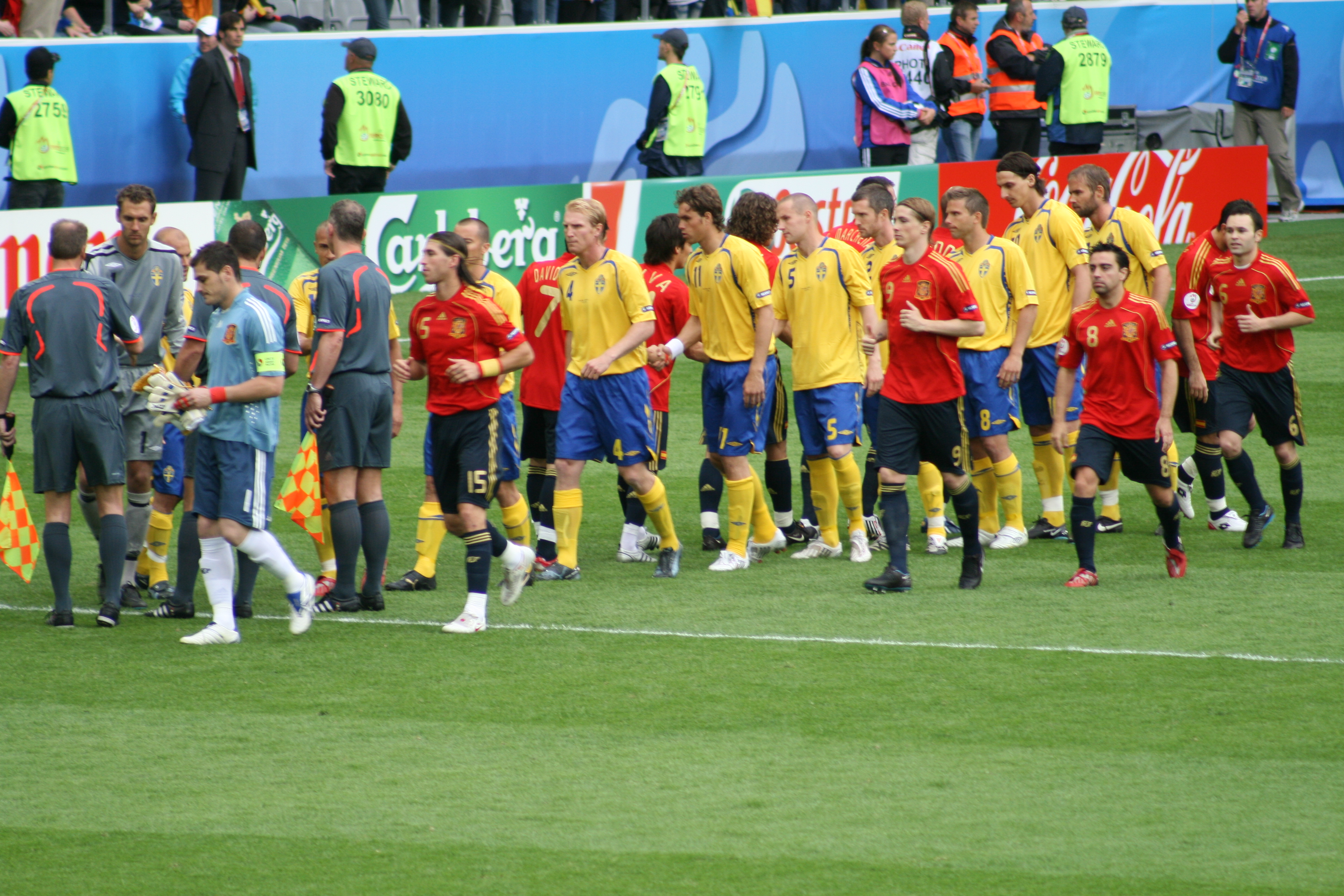
The beginning of the match between Sweden and Spain.

Group D of UEFA Euro 2008 was played from 10 to 18 June 2008. All six group matches were played at venues in Austria, in Innsbruck and Salzburg. The group was composed of defending champions Greece, as well as Sweden, eventual champions Spain and Russia. Greece, Spain and Russia had all been drawn together in the same group in the previous European Championship as well.

Following a 4–1 win over Russia in their first game, Spain qualified for the quarter-finals with a 2–1 victory against Sweden in their second. They clinched the top spot after Russia beat Greece later that day, condemning the title holders to last place in the group. The second quarter-final berth was to be decided by the Sweden–Russia match, with Sweden only needing to avoid defeat to go through. However, Russia scored a goal in each half to beat Sweden 2–0 and qualify for the quarter-finals. Meanwhile, despite going behind towards the end of the first half, Spain scored two second half goals, one coming three minutes before full time, to become the third team in the tournament to qualify for the quarter-finals with a 100% group stage record.

Greece lost all three of their group games, thus finishing bottom without a single point, becoming the worst defending champion in the history of the European Championships.

== Teams ==
Draw position	Team	Pot	Method of qualification	Date of qualification	Finals appearance	Last appearance	Previous best performance	UEFA Rankings		FIFA Rankings June 2008
Draw position	Team	Pot	Method of qualification	Date of qualification	Finals appearance	Last appearance	Previous best performance	November 2007 (Note: The UEFA rankings of November 2007 were used for seeding for the final draw.)	May 2008 (Note: UEFA unveiled a new ranking system in May 2008 based on results up to November 2007.)	FIFA Rankings June 2008
D1	Greece	1	Group C winner	17 October 2007	3rd	2004	Winners (2004)	11	9	8
D2	Sweden	2	Group F runner-up	21 November 2007	4th	2004	Semi-finals (1992)	5	10	30
D3	Spain	3	Group F winner	17 November 2007	8th	2004	Winners (1964)	9	8	4
D4	Russia (Note: From 1960 to 1988, Russia competed as the Soviet Union, and in 1992 as CIS.)	4	Group E runner-up	21 November 2007	9th	2004	Winners (1960)	15	15	24

== Standings ==
Pos	Team	Pld	W	D	L	GF	GA	GD	Pts	Qualification
1	Spain	3	3	0	0	8	3	+5	9	Advance to knockout stage
2	Russia	3	2	0	1	4	4	0	6	Advance to knockout stage
3	Sweden	3	1	0	2	3	4	−1	3	
4	Greece	3	0	0	3	1	5	−4	0	

Source: UEFA
Rules for classification: Group stage tiebreakers

In the quarter-finals,

- The winner of Group D, Spain, advanced to play the runner-up of Group C, Italy.
- The runner-up of Group D, Russia, advanced to play the winner of Group C, Netherlands.

== Matches ==
=== Spain vs Russia ===
10 June 2008
18:00

Spain	4–1	Russia
Villa 20', 44', 75'; Fàbregas 90+1'	Report	Pavlyuchenko 86'

Tivoli-Neu, Innsbruck
Attendance: 30,772
Referee: Konrad Plautz (Austria)

Spain	Russia

GK	1	Iker Casillas (c)
RB	15	Sergio Ramos
CB	5	Carles Puyol
CB	4	Carlos Marchena
LB	11	Joan Capdevila
RM	21	David Silva	(substituted off) 77'
CM	19	Marcos Senna
CM	8	Xavi
LM	6	Andrés Iniesta	(substituted off) 63'
CF	7	David Villa
CF	9	Fernando Torres	(substituted off) 54'
Substitutions:
MF	10	Cesc Fàbregas	(substituted on) 54'
MF	12	Santi Cazorla	(substituted on) 63'
MF	14	Xabi Alonso	(substituted on) 77'
Manager:
Luis Aragonés

GK	1	Igor Akinfeev
RB	22	Aleksandr Anyukov
CB	14	Roman Shirokov
CB	8	Denis Kolodin
LB	18	Yuri Zhirkov
DM	11	Sergei Semak (c)
CM	17	Konstantin Zyryanov
CM	20	Igor Semshov	(substituted off) 58'
RW	21	Dmitri Sychev	(substituted off) 46'
LW	15	Diniyar Bilyaletdinov
CF	19	Roman Pavlyuchenko
Substitutions:
MF	23	Vladimir Bystrov	(substituted on) 46'	(substituted off) 70'
MF	7	Dmitri Torbinski	(substituted on) 58'
FW	6	Roman Adamov		(substituted on) 70'
Manager:
(Netherlands) Guus Hiddink

Man of the Match:
David Villa (Spain)

Assistant referees:
Egon Bereuter (Austria)
Markus Mayr (Austria)
Fourth official:
Grzegorz Gilewski (Poland)
Reserve assistant referee:
Carsten Kadach (Germany)

=== Greece vs Sweden ===
10 June 2008
20:45

Greece	0–2	Sweden
	Report	Ibrahimović 67'; Hansson 72'

Stadion Wals-Siezenheim, Salzburg
Attendance: 31,063
Referee: Massimo Busacca (Switzerland)

Greece	Sweden

GK	1	Antonios Nikopolidis
RB	2	Giourkas Seitaridis	(yellow card) 51'
CB	16	Sotirios Kyrgiakos
CB	19	Paraskevas Antzas
CB	5	Traianos Dellas		(substituted off) 70'
LB	15	Vasilis Torosidis	(yellow card) 61'
RM	9	Angelos Charisteas	(yellow card) 1'
CM	6	Angelos Basinas (c)
CM	21	Kostas Katsouranis
LM	10	Giorgos Karagounis
CF	17	Theofanis Gekas		(substituted off) 46'
Substitutions:
FW	7	Georgios Samaras		(substituted on) 46'
FW	20	Ioannis Amanatidis		(substituted on) 70'
Manager:
(Germany) Otto Rehhagel

GK	1	Andreas Isaksson
RB	7	Niclas Alexandersson	(substituted off) 74'
CB	3	Olof Mellberg
CB	4	Petter Hansson
LB	2	Mikael Nilsson
DM	8	Anders Svensson
RM	21	Christian Wilhelmsson	(substituted off) 78'
LM	9	Freddie Ljungberg (c)
AM	19	Daniel Andersson
CF	10	Zlatan Ibrahimović	(substituted off) 71'
CF	17	Henrik Larsson
Substitutions:
FW	11	Johan Elmander	(substituted on) 71'
DF	5	Fredrik Stoor	(substituted on) 74'
FW	22	Markus Rosenberg	(substituted on) 78'
Manager:
Lars Lagerbäck

Man of the Match:
Zlatan Ibrahimović (Sweden)

Assistant referees:
Matthias Arnet (Switzerland)
Stéphane Cuhat (Switzerland)
Fourth official:
Ivan Bebek (Croatia)
Reserve assistant referee:
Volker Wezel (Germany)

=== Sweden vs Spain ===
14 June 2008
18:00

Sweden	1–2	Spain
Ibrahimović 34'	Report	Torres 15'; Villa 90+2'

Tivoli-Neu, Innsbruck
Attendance: 30,772
Referee: Pieter Vink (Netherlands)

Sweden	Spain

GK	1	Andreas Isaksson
RB	5	Fredrik Stoor
CB	3	Olof Mellberg
CB	4	Petter Hansson
LB	2	Mikael Nilsson
RM	11	Johan Elmander		(substituted off) 79'
CM	19	Daniel Andersson
CM	8	Anders Svensson	(yellow card) 55'
LM	9	Freddie Ljungberg (c)
CF	17	Henrik Larsson		(substituted off) 87'
CF	10	Zlatan Ibrahimović		(substituted off) 46'
Substitutions:
FW	22	Markus Rosenberg		(substituted on) 46'
MF	18	Sebastian Larsson		(substituted on) 79'
MF	16	Kim Källström		(substituted on) 87'
Manager:
Lars Lagerbäck

GK	1	Iker Casillas (c)
RB	15	Sergio Ramos
CB	4	Carlos Marchena	(yellow card) 53'
CB	5	Carles Puyol		(substituted off) 24'
LB	11	Joan Capdevila
RM	6	Andrés Iniesta		(substituted off) 59'
CM	19	Marcos Senna
CM	8	Xavi		(substituted off) 59'
LM	21	David Silva
CF	7	David Villa
CF	9	Fernando Torres
Substitutions:
DF	2	Raúl Albiol		(substituted on) 24'
MF	10	Cesc Fàbregas		(substituted on) 59'
MF	12	Santi Cazorla		(substituted on) 59'
Manager:
Luis Aragonés

Man of the Match:
David Villa (Spain)

Assistant referees:
Adriaan Inia (Netherlands)
Hans ten Hoove (Netherlands)
Fourth official:
Craig Thomson (Scotland)
Reserve assistant referee:
Martin Balko (Slovakia)

=== Greece vs Russia ===
14 June 2008
20:45

Greece	0–1	Russia
	Report	Zyryanov 33'

Stadion Wals-Siezenheim, Salzburg
Attendance: 31,063
Referee: Roberto Rosetti (Italy)

Greece	Russia

GK	1	Antonios Nikopolidis
RB	2	Giourkas Seitaridis		(substituted off) 40'
CB	5	Traianos Dellas
CB	16	Sotirios Kyrgiakos
LB	15	Vasilis Torosidis
RM	21	Kostas Katsouranis
CM	6	Angelos Basinas (c)
LM	3	Christos Patsatzoglou
AM	9	Angelos Charisteas
AM	20	Ioannis Amanatidis		(substituted off) 80'
CF	23	Nikos Liberopoulos	(yellow card) 58'	(substituted off) 61'
Substitutions:
MF	10	Giorgos Karagounis	(yellow card) 42'	(substituted on) 40'
FW	17	Theofanis Gekas		(substituted on) 61'
MF	8	Stelios Giannakopoulos		(substituted on) 80'
Manager:
(Germany) Otto Rehhagel

GK	1	Igor Akinfeev
RB	22	Aleksandr Anyukov
CB	8	Denis Kolodin
CB	4	Sergei Ignashevich
LB	18	Yuri Zhirkov		(substituted off) 87'
DM	11	Sergei Semak (c)
RM	7	Dmitri Torbinski	(yellow card) 84'
CM	17	Konstantin Zyryanov
CM	20	Igor Semshov
LM	15	Diniyar Bilyaletdinov		(substituted off) 70'
CF	19	Roman Pavlyuchenko
Substitutions:
FW	9	Ivan Saenko	(yellow card) 77'	(substituted on) 70'
DF	2	Vasili Berezutski		(substituted on) 87'
Manager:
(Netherlands) Guus Hiddink

Man of the Match:
Roman Pavlyuchenko (Russia)

Assistant referees:
Alessandro Griselli (Italy)
Paolo Calcagno (Italy)
Fourth official:
Olegário Benquerença (Portugal)
Reserve assistant referee:
Roman Slyško (Slovakia)

=== Greece vs Spain ===
18 June 2008
20:45

Greece	1–2	Spain
Charisteas 42'	Report	De la Red 61'; Güiza 88'

Stadion Wals-Siezenheim, Salzburg
Attendance: 30,883
Referee: Howard Webb (England)

Greece	Spain

GK	1	Antonios Nikopolidis (c)
RB	11	Loukas Vyntra	(yellow card) 90+1'
CB	16	Sotirios Kyrgiakos		(substituted off) 62'
CB	5	Traianos Dellas
LB	4	Nikos Spiropoulos
CM	6	Angelos Basinas	(yellow card) 72'
CM	21	Kostas Katsouranis
RW	14	Dimitris Salpingidis		(substituted off) 86'
AM	10	Giorgos Karagounis	(yellow card) 34'	(substituted off) 74'
LW	20	Ioannis Amanatidis
CF	9	Angelos Charisteas
Substitutions:
DF	19	Paraskevas Antzas		(substituted on) 62'
MF	22	Alexandros Tziolis		(substituted on) 74'
MF	8	Stelios Giannakopoulos		(substituted on) 86'
Manager:
(Germany) Otto Rehhagel

GK	23	Pepe Reina
RB	18	Álvaro Arbeloa	(yellow card) 45'
CB	2	Raúl Albiol
CB	20	Juanito
LB	3	Fernando Navarro
CM	22	Rubén de la Red
CM	14	Xabi Alonso (c)
RW	16	Sergio García
AM	10	Cesc Fàbregas
LW	6	Andrés Iniesta		(substituted off) 58'
CF	17	Dani Güiza	(yellow card) 41'
Substitutions:
MF	12	Santi Cazorla		(substituted on) 58'
Manager:
Luis Aragonés

Man of the Match:
Xabi Alonso (Spain)

Assistant referees:
Darren Cann (England)
Mike Mullarkey (England)
Fourth official:
Stéphane Lannoy (France)
Reserve assistant referee:
Markus Mayr (Austria)

=== Russia vs Sweden ===
18 June 2008
20:45

Russia	2–0	Sweden
Pavlyuchenko 24'; Arshavin 50'	Report

Tivoli-Neu, Innsbruck
Attendance: 30,772
Referee: Frank De Bleeckere (Belgium)

Russia	Sweden

GK	1	Igor Akinfeev
RB	22	Aleksandr Anyukov
CB	4	Sergei Ignashevich
CB	8	Denis Kolodin	(yellow card) 76'
LB	18	Yuri Zhirkov
DM	11	Sergei Semak (c)	(yellow card) 57'
RM	17	Konstantin Zyryanov
CM	20	Igor Semshov
LM	15	Diniyar Bilyaletdinov		(substituted off) 66'
SS	10	Andrey Arshavin	(yellow card) 65'
CF	19	Roman Pavlyuchenko		(substituted off) 90'
Substitutions:
FW	9	Ivan Saenko		(substituted on) 66'
MF	23	Vladimir Bystrov		(substituted on) 90'
Manager:
(Netherlands) Guus Hiddink

GK	1	Andreas Isaksson	(yellow card) 10'
RB	5	Fredrik Stoor
CB	3	Olof Mellberg
CB	4	Petter Hansson
LB	2	Mikael Nilsson		(substituted off) 79'
RM	11	Johan Elmander	(yellow card) 49'
CM	19	Daniel Andersson		(substituted off) 56'
CM	8	Anders Svensson
LM	9	Freddie Ljungberg (c)
CF	17	Henrik Larsson
CF	10	Zlatan Ibrahimović
Substitutions:
MF	16	Kim Källström		(substituted on) 56'
FW	20	Marcus Allbäck		(substituted on) 79'
Manager:
Lars Lagerbäck

Man of the Match:
Andrei Arshavin (Russia)

Assistant referees:
Peter Hermans (Belgium)
Alex Verstraeten (Belgium)
Fourth official:
Kristinn Jakobsson (Iceland)
Reserve assistant referee:
Egon Bereuter (Austria)

== See also ==
- Greece at the UEFA European Championship
- Russia at the UEFA European Championship
- Spain at the UEFA European Championship
- Sweden at the UEFA European Championship
