= Greece at the UEFA European Championship =

International football delegation

Greece have qualified for only four out of seventeen UEFA European Championships, but crowned themselves European champions in 2004. At Euro 2004 they beat hosts and heavily favored Portugal in the final, resulting in their first major tournament win.

== Overall record ==
UEFA European Championship record									Qualification record					
Year	Round	Position	Pld	W	D*	L	GF	GA	Pld	W	D	L	GF	GA
(France) 1960	Did not qualify								2	0	1	1	2	8
(Spain) 1964	Did not enter								Withdrew					
(Italy) 1968	Did not qualify								5	2	1	2	7	8
(Belgium) 1972	Did not qualify								6	1	1	4	3	8
(Socialist Federal Republic of Yugoslavia) 1976	Did not qualify								6	2	3	1	12	9
(Italy) 1980	Group stage	8th	3	0	1	2	1	4	6	3	1	2	13	7
(France) 1984	Did not qualify								8	3	2	3	8	10
(West Germany) 1988	Did not qualify								8	4	1	3	12	13
(Sweden) 1992	Did not qualify								8	3	2	3	11	9
(England) 1996	Did not qualify								10	6	0	4	23	9
(Belgium) (Netherlands) 2000	Did not qualify								10	4	3	3	13	8
(Portugal) 2004	Champions	1st	6	4	1	1	7	4	8	6	0	2	8	4
(Austria) (Switzerland) 2008	Group stage	16th	3	0	0	3	1	5	12	10	1	1	25	10
(Poland) (Ukraine) 2012	Quarter-finals	7th	4	1	1	2	5	7	10	7	3	0	14	5
(France) 2016	Did not qualify								10	1	3	6	7	14
(Europe) 2020	Did not qualify								10	4	2	4	12	14
(Germany) 2024	Did not qualify								10	5	2	3	19	8
(United Kingdom) (Republic of Ireland) 2028	To be determined								To be determined					
(Italy) (Turkey) 2032	To be determined								To be determined					
Total	1 Title	4/17	16	5	3	8	14	20	129	61	26	42	189	144

^{*} Draws include knockout matches decided via penalty shoot-out.

Line-ups for the Euro 2004 final, where Greece defeated hosts Portugal 1–0.

Greece's European Championship record
First Match	Netherlands 1–0 Greece (Naples, Italy; 11 June 1980)
Biggest Win	Portugal 1–2 Greece (Porto, Portugal; 12 June 2004); France 0–1 Greece (Lisbon, Portugal; 25 June 2004); Greece 1–0 Czech Republic (Porto, Portugal; 1 July 2004); Portugal 0–1 Greece (Lisbon, Portugal; 4 July 2004); Greece 1–0 Russia (Warsaw, Poland; 16 June 2012)
Biggest Defeat	Greece 1–3 Czechoslovakia (Rome, Italy; 14 June 1980); Greece 0–2 Sweden (Salzburg, Austria; 10 June 2008); Germany 4–2 Greece (Gdańsk, Poland; 22 June 2012)
Best Result	Champions at the 2004 UEFA European Championship
Worst Result	Group stage at the 1980 and 2008 UEFA European Championship

== Head-to-head record ==
Opponent	Pld	W	D	L	GF	GA
Czech Republic	3	1	0	2	3	5
France	1	1	0	0	1	0
Germany	2	0	1	1	2	4
Netherlands	1	0	0	1	0	1
Poland	1	0	1	0	1	1
Portugal	2	2	0	0	3	1
Russia	3	1	0	2	2	3
Spain	2	0	1	1	2	3
Sweden	1	0	0	1	0	2
Total	16	5	3	8	14	20

== Euro 1980 ==
=== Group stage ===
Pos	Team	Pld	W	D	L	GF	GA	GD	Pts	Qualification
1	West Germany	3	2	1	0	4	2	+2	5	Advance to final
2	Czechoslovakia	3	1	1	1	4	3	+1	3	Advance to third place play-off
3	Netherlands	3	1	1	1	4	4	0	3	
4	Greece	3	0	1	2	1	4	−3	1	

Source: UEFA
Rules for classification: Group stage tiebreakers
11 June 1980
20:30

Netherlands	1–0	Greece
Kist 65' (pen.)	Report

Stadio San Paolo, Naples
Attendance: 14,990
Referee: Adolf Prokop (East Germany)

14 June 1980
20:30

Greece	1–3	Czechoslovakia
Anastopoulos 14'	Report	Panenka 6'; Vízek 26'; Nehoda 63'

Stadio Olimpico, Rome
Attendance: 7,614
Referee: Pat Partridge (England)

17 June 1980
20:30

Greece	0–0	West Germany
	Report

Stadio Comunale, Turin
Attendance: 13,901
Referee: Brian McGinlay (Scotland)

== Euro 2004 ==
=== Group stage ===
Pos	Team	Pld	W	D	L	GF	GA	GD	Pts	Qualification
1	Portugal (H)	3	2	0	1	4	2	+2	6	Advance to knockout stage
2	Greece	3	1	1	1	4	4	0	4 (Note: Tied on head-to-head result (Greece 1–1 Spain) and overall goal difference (0). Overall goals for was used as the tiebreaker.)	Advance to knockout stage
3	Spain	3	1	1	1	2	2	0	4	
4	Russia	3	1	0	2	2	4	−2	3	

Source: UEFA
Rules for classification: Group stage tiebreakers
(H) Hosts
Notes:
12 June 2004
17:00

Portugal	1–2	Greece
Ronaldo 90+3'	Report	Karagounis 7'; Basinas 51' (pen.)

Estádio do Dragão, Porto
Attendance: 48,761
Referee: Pierluigi Collina (Italy)

16 June 2004
17:00

Greece	1–1	Spain
Charisteas 66'	Report	Morientes 28'

Estádio do Bessa, Porto
Attendance: 25,444
Referee: Ľuboš Micheľ (Slovakia)

20 June 2004
19:45

Russia	2–1	Greece
Kirichenko 2'; Bulykin 17'	Report	Vryzas 43'

Estádio Algarve, Faro/Loulé
Attendance: 24,347
Referee: Gilles Veissière (France)

=== Knockout stage ===
Quarter-finals

25 June 2004
19:45

France	0–1	Greece
	Report	Charisteas 65'

Estádio José Alvalade, Lisbon
Attendance: 45,390
Referee: Anders Frisk (Sweden)

Semi-finals

1 July 2004
19:45

Greece	1–0 (a.e.t./s.g.)	Czech Republic
Dellas 105+1'	Report

Estádio do Dragão, Porto
Attendance: 42,449
Referee: Pierluigi Collina (Italy)

Final

4 July 2004
19:45

Portugal	0–1	Greece
	Report	Charisteas 57'

Estádio da Luz, Lisbon
Attendance: 62,865
Referee: Markus Merk (Germany)

== Euro 2008 ==
=== Group stage ===
Pos	Team	Pld	W	D	L	GF	GA	GD	Pts	Qualification
1	Spain	3	3	0	0	8	3	+5	9	Advance to knockout stage
2	Russia	3	2	0	1	4	4	0	6	Advance to knockout stage
3	Sweden	3	1	0	2	3	4	−1	3	
4	Greece	3	0	0	3	1	5	−4	0	

Source: UEFA
Rules for classification: Group stage tiebreakers
10 June 2008
20:45

Greece	0–2	Sweden
	Report	Ibrahimović 67'; Hansson 72'

Stadion Wals-Siezenheim, Salzburg
Attendance: 31,063
Referee: Massimo Busacca (Switzerland)

14 June 2008
20:45

Greece	0–1	Russia
	Report	Zyryanov 33'

Stadion Wals-Siezenheim, Salzburg
Attendance: 31,063
Referee: Roberto Rosetti (Italy)

18 June 2008
20:45

Greece	1–2	Spain
Charisteas 42'	Report	De la Red 61'; Güiza 88'

Stadion Wals-Siezenheim, Salzburg
Attendance: 30,883
Referee: Howard Webb (England)

== Euro 2012 ==
=== Group stage ===
Pos	Team	Pld	W	D	L	GF	GA	GD	Pts	Qualification
1	Czech Republic	3	2	0	1	4	5	−1	6	Advance to knockout stage
2	Greece	3	1	1	1	3	3	0	4 (Note: Head-to-head result: Greece 1–0 Russia.)	Advance to knockout stage
3	Russia	3	1	1	1	5	3	+2	4	
4	Poland (H)	3	0	2	1	2	3	−1	2	

Source: UEFA
Rules for classification: Group stage tiebreakers
(H) Hosts
Notes:
8 June 2012
18:00 CEST

Poland	1–1	Greece
Lewandowski 17'	Report	Salpingidis 51'

National Stadium, Warsaw
Attendance: 56,070
Referee: Carlos Velasco Carballo (Spain)

12 June 2012
18:00 CEST

Greece	1–2	Czech Republic
Gekas 53'	Report	Jiráček 3'; Pilař 6'

Stadion Miejski, Wrocław
Attendance: 41,105
Referee: Stéphane Lannoy (France)

16 June 2012
20:45 CEST

Greece	1–0	Russia
Karagounis 45+2'	Report

National Stadium, Warsaw
Attendance: 55,614
Referee: Jonas Eriksson (Sweden)

=== Knockout stage ===
Quarter-finals

22 June 2012
20:45 CEST

Germany	4–2	Greece
Lahm 39'; Khedira 61'; Klose 68'; Reus 74'	Report	Samaras 55'; Salpingidis 89' (pen.)

PGE Arena, Gdańsk
Attendance: 38,751
Referee: Damir Skomina (Slovenia)

== Goalscorers ==
Player	Goals	1980	2004	2008	2012
Angelos Charisteas	4		3	1	
Giorgos Karagounis	2		1		1
Dimitris Salpingidis	2				2
Nikos Anastopoulos	1	1			
Angelos Basinas	1		1		
Traianos Dellas	1		1		
Theofanis Gekas	1				1
Georgios Samaras	1				1
Zisis Vryzas	1		1		
Total	14	1	7	1	5

== See also ==
- Greece at the FIFA Confederations Cup
- Greece at the FIFA World Cup
