= UEFA Euro 2004 Group A =

Football tournament group stage

Group A of UEFA Euro 2004 was one of four groups in the final tournament's initial group stage. It began on 12 June and was completed on 20 June. The group consisted of hosts Portugal, Spain, Russia and Greece.

Portugal won the group and advanced to the quarter-finals, along with Greece. Spain and Russia failed to advance. Greece and Portugal faced each other again in the tournament final, with Greece again emerging victorious.

== Teams ==
Draw position	Team	Pot	Method of qualification	Date of qualification	Finals appearance	Last appearance	Previous best performance	UEFA Rankings November 2003 (Note: The UEFA rankings of November 2003 were used for seeding for the final draw.)	FIFA Rankings June 2004
A1	Portugal	1	Host	12 October 1999	4th	2000	Semi-finals (1984, 2000)	2	22
A2	Greece	4	Group 6 winner	11 October 2003	2nd	1980	Group stage (1980)	23	35
A3	Spain	2	Play-off winner	19 November 2003	7th	2000	Winners (1964)	6	3
A4	Russia (Note: From 1960 to 1988, Russia competed as the Soviet Union, and in 1992 as CIS.)	3	Play-off winner	19 November 2003	8th	1996	Winners (1960)	13	31

== Standings ==
Pos	Team	Pld	W	D	L	GF	GA	GD	Pts	Qualification
1	Portugal (H)	3	2	0	1	4	2	+2	6	Advance to knockout stage
2	Greece	3	1	1	1	4	4	0	4 (Note: Tied on head-to-head result (Greece 1–1 Spain) and overall goal difference (0). Overall goals for was used as the tiebreaker.)	Advance to knockout stage
3	Spain	3	1	1	1	2	2	0	4	
4	Russia	3	1	0	2	2	4	−2	3	

Source: UEFA
Rules for classification: Group stage tiebreakers
(H) Hosts
Notes:

In the quarter-finals,

- The winner of Group A, Portugal, advanced to play the runner-up of Group B, England.
- The runner-up of Group A, Greece, advanced to play the winner of Group B, France.

== Matches ==
=== Portugal vs Greece ===
12 June 2004
17:00

Portugal	1–2	Greece
Ronaldo 90+3'	Report	Karagounis 7'; Basinas 51' (pen.)

Estádio do Dragão, Porto
Attendance: 48,761
Referee: Pierluigi Collina (Italy)

Portugal	Greece

GK	1	Ricardo
RB	2	Paulo Ferreira
CB	4	Jorge Andrade
CB	5	Fernando Couto (c)
LB	3	Rui Jorge
CM	18	Maniche
CM	6	Costinha	(yellow card) 21'	(substituted off) 66'
RW	7	Luís Figo
AM	10	Rui Costa		(substituted off) 46'
LW	11	Simão		(substituted off) 46'
CF	9	Pauleta	(yellow card) 57'
Substitutions:
FW	17	Cristiano Ronaldo		(substituted on) 46'
MF	20	Deco		(substituted on) 46'
FW	21	Nuno Gomes		(substituted on) 66'
Manager:
(Brazil) Luiz Felipe Scolari

GK	1	Antonios Nikopolidis
RB	2	Giourkas Seitaridis	(yellow card) 76'
CB	5	Traianos Dellas
CB	19	Michalis Kapsis
LB	14	Takis Fyssas
RM	20	Giorgos Karagounis	(yellow card) 39'	(substituted off) 46'
CM	7	Theodoros Zagorakis (c)
CM	6	Angelos Basinas
LM	8	Stelios Giannakopoulos		(substituted off) 68'
CF	9	Angelos Charisteas		(substituted off) 74'
CF	15	Zisis Vryzas
Substitutions:
MF	21	Kostas Katsouranis		(substituted on) 46'
FW	11	Demis Nikolaidis		(substituted on) 68'
MF	23	Vasilios Lakis		(substituted on) 74'
Manager:
(Germany) Otto Rehhagel

Man of the Match:
Theodoros Zagorakis (Greece)

Assistant referees:
Marco Ivaldi (Italy)
Narciso Pisacreta (Italy)
Fourth official:
Alain Hamer (Luxembourg)

=== Spain vs Russia ===
12 June 2004
19:45

Spain	1–0	Russia
Valerón 60'	Report

Estádio Algarve, Faro/Loulé
Attendance: 28,182
Referee: Urs Meier (Switzerland)

Spain	Russia

GK	23	Iker Casillas
RB	5	Carles Puyol
CB	6	Iván Helguera
CB	3	Carlos Marchena	(yellow card) 66'
LB	15	Raúl Bravo
CM	4	David Albelda	(yellow card) 85'
CM	8	Rubén Baraja	(yellow card) 43'	(substituted off) 59'
RW	17	Joseba Etxeberria
AM	7	Raúl (c)		(substituted off) 78'
LW	14	Vicente
CF	10	Fernando Morientes		(substituted off) 59'
Substitutions:
MF	16	Xabi Alonso		(substituted on) 59'
MF	21	Juan Carlos Valerón		(substituted on) 59'
FW	9	Fernando Torres		(substituted on) 78'
Manager:
Iñaki Sáez

GK	1	Sergei Ovchinnikov
RB	16	Vadim Evseev
CB	4	Alexey Smertin (c)	(yellow card) 29'
CB	13	Roman Sharonov	(yellow card) 27' (yellow-red card) 88'
LB	17	Dmitri Sennikov
DM	22	Evgeni Aldonin	(yellow card) 32'	(substituted off) 68'
RM	8	Rolan Gusev	(yellow card) 12'	(substituted off) 46'
CM	15	Dmitri Alenichev
CM	10	Aleksandr Mostovoi
LM	7	Marat Izmailov		(substituted off) 74'
CF	9	Dmitri Bulykin
Substitutions:
MF	2	Vladislav Radimov	(yellow card) 90'	(substituted on) 46'
FW	3	Dmitri Sychev		(substituted on) 68'
MF	5	Andrei Karyaka		(substituted on) 74'
Manager:
Georgi Yartsev

Man of the Match:
Vicente (Spain)

Assistant referees:
Rudolf Käppeli (Switzerland)
Francesco Buragina (Switzerland)
Fourth official:
Kim Milton Nielsen (Denmark)

=== Greece vs Spain ===
16 June 2004
17:00

Greece	1–1	Spain
Charisteas 66'	Report	Morientes 28'

Estádio do Bessa, Porto
Attendance: 25,444
Referee: Ľuboš Micheľ (Slovakia)

Greece	Spain

GK	1	Antonios Nikopolidis
RB	2	Giourkas Seitaridis
CB	5	Traianos Dellas
CB	19	Michalis Kapsis
LB	14	Takis Fyssas		(substituted off) 86'
RM	20	Giorgos Karagounis	(yellow card) 27'	(substituted off) 53'
CM	7	Theodoros Zagorakis (c)	(yellow card) 61'
CM	21	Kostas Katsouranis	(yellow card) 7'
LM	8	Stelios Giannakopoulos	(yellow card) 24'	(substituted off) 49'
CF	9	Angelos Charisteas
CF	15	Zisis Vryzas	(yellow card) 90'
Substitutions:
FW	11	Demis Nikolaidis		(substituted on) 49'
MF	10	Vasilios Tsiartas		(substituted on) 53'
DF	3	Stylianos Venetidis		(substituted on) 86'
Manager:
(Germany) Otto Rehhagel

GK	23	Iker Casillas
RB	5	Carles Puyol
CB	6	Iván Helguera	(yellow card) 37'
CB	3	Carlos Marchena	(yellow card) 16'
LB	15	Raúl Bravo
CM	4	David Albelda
CM	8	Rubén Baraja
RW	17	Joseba Etxeberria		(substituted off) 46'
AM	7	Raúl (c)		(substituted off) 80'
LW	14	Vicente
CF	10	Fernando Morientes		(substituted off) 65'
Substitutions:
MF	19	Joaquín		(substituted on) 46'
MF	21	Juan Carlos Valerón		(substituted on) 65'
FW	9	Fernando Torres		(substituted on) 80'
Manager:
Iñaki Sáez

Man of the Match:
Raúl (Spain)

Assistant referees:
Igor Šramka (Slovakia)
Martin Balko (Slovakia)
Fourth official:
Stuart Dougal (Scotland)

=== Russia vs Portugal ===
16 June 2004
19:45

Russia	0–2	Portugal
	Report	Maniche 7'; Rui Costa 89'

Estádio da Luz, Lisbon
Attendance: 59,273
Referee: Terje Hauge (Norway)

Russia	Portugal

GK	1	Sergei Ovchinnikov	(red card) 45'
RB	16	Vadim Evseev	(yellow card) 21'
CB	4	Alexey Smertin (c)	(yellow card) 16'
CB	21	Aleksei Bugayev
LB	17	Dmitri Sennikov
DM	22	Evgeni Aldonin		(substituted off) 45+2'
RM	15	Dmitri Alenichev	(yellow card) 90+2'
CM	20	Dmitri Loskov
CM	7	Marat Izmailov		(substituted off) 72'
LM	5	Andrei Karyaka		(substituted off) 79'
CF	11	Aleksandr Kerzhakov
Substitutions:
GK	12	Vyacheslav Malafeev		(substituted on) 45+2'
MF	19	Vladimir Bystrov		(substituted on) 72'
FW	9	Dmitri Bulykin		(substituted on) 79'
Manager:
Georgi Yartsev

GK	1	Ricardo
RB	13	Miguel
CB	4	Jorge Andrade
CB	16	Ricardo Carvalho	(yellow card) 24'
LB	14	Nuno Valente
CM	18	Maniche
CM	6	Costinha
RW	7	Luís Figo (c)		(substituted off) 78'
AM	20	Deco	(yellow card) 85'
LW	11	Simão		(substituted off) 63'
CF	9	Pauleta		(substituted off) 57'
Substitutions:
FW	21	Nuno Gomes		(substituted on) 57'
MF	10	Rui Costa		(substituted on) 63'
FW	17	Cristiano Ronaldo		(substituted on) 78'
Manager:
(Brazil) Luiz Felipe Scolari

Man of the Match:
Maniche (Portugal)

Assistant referees:
Ole Hermann Borgan (Norway)
Steinar Holvik (Norway)
Fourth official:
Frank De Bleeckere (Belgium)

=== Spain vs Portugal ===
20 June 2004
19:45

Spain	0–1	Portugal
	Report	Nuno Gomes 57'

Estádio José Alvalade, Lisbon
Attendance: 47,491
Referee: Anders Frisk (Sweden)

Spain	Portugal

GK	23	Iker Casillas
RB	5	Carles Puyol	(yellow card) 74'
CB	6	Iván Helguera
CB	22	Juanito	(yellow card) 68'	(substituted off) 79'
LB	15	Raúl Bravo
CM	16	Xabi Alonso
CM	4	David Albelda	(yellow card) 8'	(substituted off) 65'
RW	19	Joaquín		(substituted off) 71'
AM	7	Raúl (c)
LW	14	Vicente
CF	9	Fernando Torres
Substitutions:
MF	8	Rubén Baraja		(substituted on) 65'
FW	11	Albert Luque		(substituted on) 71'
FW	10	Fernando Morientes		(substituted on) 79'
Manager:
Iñaki Sáez

GK	1	Ricardo
RB	13	Miguel
CB	4	Jorge Andrade
CB	16	Ricardo Carvalho
LB	14	Nuno Valente
CM	6	Costinha
CM	18	Maniche
RW	7	Luís Figo (c)		(substituted off) 77'
AM	20	Deco
LW	17	Cristiano Ronaldo		(substituted off) 84'
CF	9	Pauleta	(yellow card) 7'	(substituted off) 46'
Substitutions:
FW	21	Nuno Gomes	(yellow card) 65'	(substituted on) 46'
MF	8	Petit		(substituted on) 77'
DF	5	Fernando Couto		(substituted on) 84'
Manager:
(Brazil) Luiz Felipe Scolari

Man of the Match:
Deco (Portugal)

Assistant referees:
Kenneth Petersson (Sweden)
Peter Ekström (Sweden)
Fourth official:
Stuart Dougal (Scotland)

=== Russia vs Greece ===
20 June 2004
19:45

Russia	2–1	Greece
Kirichenko 2'; Bulykin 17'	Report	Vryzas 43'

Estádio Algarve, Faro/Loulé
Attendance: 24,347
Referee: Gilles Veissière (France)

Russia	Greece

GK	12	Vyacheslav Malafeev	(yellow card) 88'
RB	14	Aleksandr Anyukov	(yellow card) 28'
CB	13	Roman Sharonov	(yellow card) 15'	(substituted off) 56'
CB	21	Aleksei Bugayev
LB	16	Vadim Evseev
RM	8	Rolan Gusev
CM	15	Dmitri Alenichev (c)	(yellow card) 65'
CM	2	Vladislav Radimov	(yellow card) 71'
LM	5	Andrei Karyaka	(yellow card) 39'	(substituted off) 46'
CF	9	Dmitri Bulykin		(substituted off) 46'
CF	18	Dmitri Kirichenko
Substitutions:
FW	3	Dmitri Sychev		(substituted on) 46'
MF	6	Igor Semshov		(substituted on) 46'
DF	17	Dmitri Sennikov		(substituted on) 56'
Manager:
Georgi Yartsev

GK	1	Antonios Nikopolidis
RB	2	Giourkas Seitaridis
CB	5	Traianos Dellas	(yellow card) 86'
CB	19	Michalis Kapsis
LB	3	Stylianos Venetidis		(substituted off) 89'
CM	6	Angelos Basinas		(substituted off) 42'
CM	21	Kostas Katsouranis
CM	7	Theodoros Zagorakis (c)
RW	9	Angelos Charisteas
LW	22	Dimitrios Papadopoulos		(substituted off) 70'
CF	15	Zisis Vryzas	(yellow card) 45'
Substitutions:
MF	10	Vasilios Tsiartas		(substituted on) 42'
FW	11	Demis Nikolaidis		(substituted on) 70'
DF	14	Takis Fyssas		(substituted on) 89'
Manager:
(Germany) Otto Rehhagel

Man of the Match:
Dmitri Kirichenko (Russia)

Assistant referees:
Frédéric Arnault (France)
Serge Vallin (France)
Fourth official:
Frank De Bleeckere (Belgium)

== See also ==
- Greece at the UEFA European Championship
- Portugal at the UEFA European Championship
- Russia at the UEFA European Championship
- Spain at the UEFA European Championship
