= UEFA Euro 2004 final =

Final match of Euro 2004

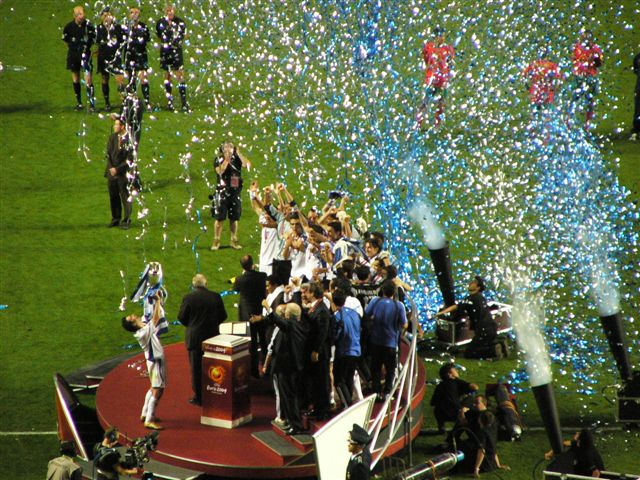
- The Greece national team celebrating their win
- Event: UEFA Euro 2004
| Portugal | Greece |
| 0 | 1 |
- Date: 4 July 2004
- Venue: Estádio da Luz, Lisbon
- Man of the Match: Theodoros Zagorakis (Greece)
- Referee: Markus Merk (Germany)
- Attendance: 62,865
- Weather: Sunny; 28 °C (82 °F); 37% humidity

The UEFA Euro 2004 final was the final match of UEFA Euro 2004, the twelfth European Championship, a football competition organised by UEFA for the senior men's national teams of its member associations. The match was played at the Estádio da Luz in Lisbon, Portugal, on 4 July 2004, and was contested by Portugal, the tournament's hosts, and underdogs Greece, in a rematch of the tournament's opening game.

The 16-team tournament consisted of a group stage, from which eight teams qualified for the knockout stage. Both finalists were drawn in Group A of the tournament, and played each other in the opening game, with Greece winning 2–1 in what BBC Sport labelled a "shock defeat" for the hosts. Portugal won their other two group matches, against Russia and Spain; Greece drew with Spain and lost to Russia, leaving Portugal top of the group and Greece second. In the knockout stage, Portugal beat England on penalties in the quarter-finals, and the Netherlands in the semi-finals. Greece, meanwhile, beat defending champions France in the quarter-finals, and the Czech Republic in the semi-finals via a silver goal.

The final took place in front of 62,865 supporters, and was refereed by Markus Merk from Germany. Greece scored the only goal in the match in the 57th minute, when Angelos Basinas' corner was met by Angelos Charisteas, who sent a powerful header past goalkeeper Ricardo. Greece held on to complete a shock 1–0 victory, winning their first title in just their second ever tournament appearance.

Several pundits labelled Greece's tournament win the greatest upset in the history of the European Championship; among these was BBC Sport's John May, who cited Greece's record of never having previously won a match at a major event and their pre-tournament bookmaker odds of 150–1. Otto Rehhagel, Greece's manager, said after the game that "it was an unusual achievement for Greek football and especially for European football", while Portugal manager Luiz Felipe Scolari expressed pain at the result, saying that Greece were the better team and lamenting that Portugal had been beaten by "one piece of sloppy defending". As winners, Greece qualified for the 2005 FIFA Confederations Cup in Germany as UEFA's representatives. However, they subsequently failed to qualify for the 2006 FIFA World Cup. Given that both nations had also faced each in the aforementioned opening match of UEFA Euro 2004, this final also marks the only time (as of 2026) in the history of the UEFA European Championships that the same two nations played each other in both the opening and final matches within the same tournament.

== Background ==
UEFA Euro 2004 was the 12th UEFA European Championship, a football competition organised by UEFA for the senior men's national teams of its member associations. The tournament was played in Portugal from 12 June to 4 July 2004. Qualifying matches were played between September 2002 and November 2003, in which fifty teams were divided into ten groups of five, playing each other on a home-and-away round-robin tournament basis. Portugal qualified automatically as hosts, along with the top team in each qualifying group. The remaining five teams were determined by a series of two-legged play-offs between the ten group runners-up. For the finals tournament, the teams were divided into four groups of four, and each team played the others in their group once. The top two teams from each group advanced to a knockout phase.

Neither Greece nor Portugal had appeared in a European Championship final before 2004. Greece's only prior appearance in a European Championship was in 1980, when they were eliminated in the group phase. Their only other major tournament appearance was at the 1994 FIFA World Cup, in which they also failed to qualify for the knockouts, losing all of their group games. Portugal had qualified three times previously: in 1984, when they lost 3–2 in the semi-final to France, a loss to the Czech Republic in the quarter-final in 1996, and another semi-final defeat to France in 2000, 2–1 on a golden goal. The two teams' last meeting before Euro 2004 was a 1–1 draw in a friendly in November 2003, and their last competitive fixture was a Euro 1992 qualifier in 1991, which Portugal won 1–0.

The final was played on 4 July 2004 at the 65,000-capacity Estádio da Luz in Lisbon. Opened in 2003, the stadium was built to replace the former home stadium of Portuguese club S.L. Benfica. Prior to the final, the Estádio da Luz hosted four matches at Euro 2004: three group matches from Groups A and B, and the quarter-final between Portugal and England. There was a slight controversy prior to the final as it was revealed that German referee Markus Merk would officiate the final in Lisbon, leading to speculation that the Greek team could benefit from favourable refereeing decisions during the final due to Merk and Greece coach Otto Rehagal both being German. These claims were firmly rejected by both Merk and Rehagel.

== Route to the final ==
=== Portugal ===
Portugal's route to the final
| | Opponent | Result |
|---|---|---|
| 1 | Greece | 1–2 |
| 2 | Russia | 2–0 |
| 3 | Spain | 1–0 |
| QF | England | 2–2 (a.e.t.) (6–5 p) |
| SF | Netherlands | 2–1 |

As the tournament hosts, Portugal were drawn in Group A, in which they were joined by Greece, Russia and Spain. Their match against eventual finalists Greece was the tournament's opening fixture, played on 12 June 2004 at the Estádio do Dragão in Porto. In what BBC Sport described as a "shock defeat", Portugal lost the match 2–1. Greece took the lead in the 7th minute through Giorgos Karagounis, who scored from 27 yards (25 m) after Portugal's Paulo Ferreira had lost possession. They doubled their lead in the second half when Cristiano Ronaldo, a substitute for Portugal, fouled Greek player Giourkas Seitaridis and Angelos Basinas scored with the resulting penalty. Ronaldo scored for Portugal late in the game, but Greece held on for a victory which marked the first time in European Championship history that a host nation had lost in the opening match. Portugal's second group game was against Russia at the Estádio da Luz in Lisbon on 16 June. They took an early lead in the 7th minute, when Deco sent the ball into the area and it was met by Maniche, who scored into the bottom corner of the Russian goal. Russia's goalkeeper Sergei Ovchinnikov was then given a red card shortly before half-time for handling the ball outside of his penalty area. Luís Figo had an opportunity for Portugal midway through the second half, which was pushed on to the goalpost by substitute goalkeeper Vyacheslav Malafeev, before Rui Costa scored a second on 89 minutes from a close-range shot with the toe of his boot, after a Ronaldo cross, to seal a 2–0 Portugal win. Their final group game was against Spain at Lisbon's Estádio José Alvalade on 20 June. Needing a win to guarantee progress, Portugal scored the game's only goal through substitute Nuno Gomes on 57 minutes. The 1–0 win saw Portugal qualify for the next round as group winners.

Portugal's quarter-final match was against England, on 24 June at the Estádio da Luz. England took the lead through Michael Owen on 3 minutes, which they held until the 83rd minute, when Hélder Postiga headed into the goal following a cross from Simão Sabrosa. The match went to extra time, and Rui Costa gave Portugal the lead on 110 minutes with a powerful shot from 20 yards (18 m) out. Frank Lampard equalised for England five minutes later, and with the match finishing 2–2 it was decided by a penalty shoot-out. David Beckham missed England's first penalty, but Rui Costa then missed with Portugal's third, both players shooting over the crossbar. With all other penalties scored, the shoot-out went to sudden death at 4–4. Taking England's seventh penalty, Darius Vassell had his shot saved by goalkeeper Ricardo, who then took Portugal's next penalty himself, to seal a 6–5 shoot-out win. The hosts returned to the Estádio José Alvalade for the semi-final on 30 June, in which they played the Netherlands. Ronaldo scored after 26 minutes with a header, following what BBC Sport described as "slack Dutch marking". Maniche then scored Portugal's second on 58 minutes, with a curving shot from the edge of the penalty area from a Ronaldo pass. Jorge Andrade scored an own goal five minutes later, under pressure from the Netherlands' Ruud van Nistelrooy, but Portugal held on for a 2–1 win and a place in the final.

=== Greece ===
Greece's route to the final
| | Opponent | Result |
|---|---|---|
| 1 | Portugal | 2–1 |
| 2 | Spain | 1–1 |
| 3 | Russia | 1–2 |
| QF | France | 1–0 |
| SF | Czech Republic | 1–0 (a.s.d.e.t.) |

After defeating Portugal in the opening game, Greece's second Group A fixture was against Spain at Porto's Estádio do Bessa. Spain took the lead shortly before the half-hour mark through a low shot by Fernando Morientes, after Raúl had taken the ball from Greece's Michalis Kapsis on the edge of the penalty area. Raúl had a chance to make it 2–0 with a header in the second half, but it was Greece who scored the next goal, when Angelos Charisteas intercepted a long pass from Vasilios Tsiartas for the equaliser. The match finished 1–1, leaving Greece on 4 points and needing only a draw from their final group game to guarantee progress to the next round. That match took place on 20 June 2004, against already-eliminated Russia at the Estádio Algarve in Faro. Greece suffered an early setback, when Dmitri Kirichenko opened the scoring for Russia after 67 seconds, which until Euro 2024 was the fastest goal in the history of the European Championship. Greece went further behind on 17 minutes, through a Dmitri Bulykin header following a Russian corner kick. Shortly before half-time, Zisis Vryzas scored a goal for Greece to reduce the deficit, but they could not find an equaliser and the game finished 2–1 to Russia. Spain's defeat to Portugal meant that Greece and Spain were level on points but Greece progressed as they had scored more goals than Spain.

In the quarter-finals, Greece faced France on 25 June at the Estádio José Alvalade. France were the defending champions, having won the Euro 2000 final, but Greece won the game 1–0 with a performance described by Kevin McCarra of The Guardian as "undaunted and controlled". The winning goal was scored by Charisteas in the 65th minute with a header, after Theodoros Zagorakis had run with the ball down the right and crossed to him. Thierry Henry had a late chance to equalise for France, but his header went wide. Greece's semi-final opponents were the Czech Republic, whom they faced on 1 July at the Estádio do Dragão. The Czech Republic had two early chances – a powerful volley by Tomáš Rosický which struck the crossbar and a shot by Marek Jankulovski, which Greek goalkeeper Antonios Nikopolidis saved. The remainder of the match was described by Mark Chaplin for UEFA as a "tight contest between the Czechs' superior technique and Greece's industry and commitment", and despite chances for both sides, it remained 0–0 after 90 minutes. The game went to extra time, and in injury time of the first period, Traianos Dellas headed Greece into the lead from a corner. Euro 2004 made use of the silver goal rule, in which the game would end if any team were leading at half-time in extra time. Greece thus won the match 1–0, without the second period of extra time being played. It was the only major international game decided by a silver goal before the rule was abolished.

== Match ==
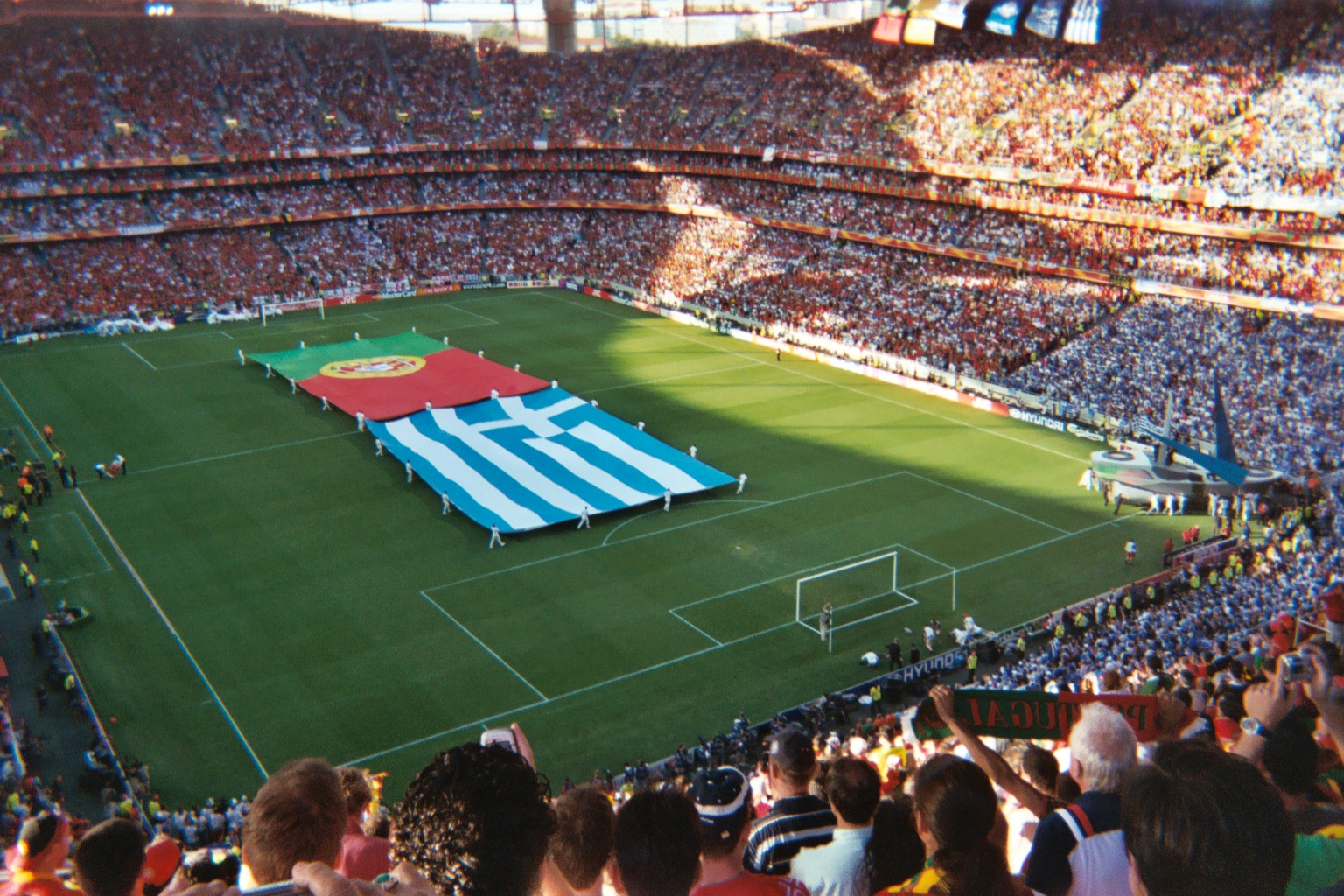
Portuguese and Greek flags on display before the match

=== Pre-match ===
Portugal made one change from the team that started the semi-final; Ronaldo started on the right wing, while Simão dropped to the substitutes' bench. Greece's Karagounis was suspended for the game, and Stelios Giannakopoulos started in his place. The referee for the game was Markus Merk of Germany. The assistant referees were Christian Schräer and Jan-Hendrik Salver, also of Germany, and Sweden's Anders Frisk was the fourth official.

=== First half ===
Greece kicked off the match at 7:45 pm local time (6:45 pm UTC) in temperatures of 28 °C (82 °F) with 37% humidity at the end of a sunny day, with 62,865 spectators in attendance. Phil McNulty of BBC Sport characterised the opening as Greece "[retreating] quickly into defence in typical style, leaving Portugal to take the early initiative". Portugal made several early runs towards the Greek goal, first through Pauleta, who lost the ball to a tackle by Zagorakis, and then through Ronaldo, Deco and Figo, but after 10 minutes neither side had had any serious opportunities to score in the opening. Nikopolidis had to make the first save of the match in the 13th minute when he tipped behind a low shot on goal by Miguel. Greece almost scored two minutes later when Charisteas was in possession 10 yards (9 m) from goal following a Portuguese defensive error, Ricardo running off his line to save the toe-poked shot. Maniche hit a shot from the edge of the Greek penalty area on 23 minutes, which went narrowly wide of the right-hand goalpost.

Around the half-hour mark, Greece launched several attacks down the left. Portugal had an opportunity with a free kick taken by Figo on the edge of the Greek penalty area, but it was too high for Ronaldo's attempted header. Both defences continued to prevent many goal-scoring opportunities as the half progressed. Katsouranis had one opportunity on 38 minutes, but his header was weak and went wide of the goal. Miguel was replaced by Paulo Ferreira in the 41st minute, after sustaining an injury, then Basinas received a yellow card shortly before half-time for a deliberate handball as Ronaldo attempted to pass the ball to Figo. That was the last action of the half, which finished 0–0, as Barry Glendenning of The Guardian described the game thus far as "dull".

=== Second half ===
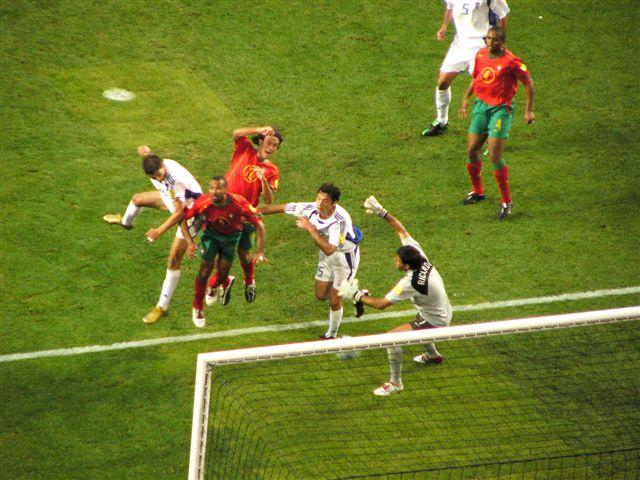
Angelos Charisteas scoring the winning goal

No substitutions were made by either team at half-time, and Portugal kicked off the second half. Pauleta ran with the ball into the Greek penalty area on 48 minutes, but his shot was blocked by Greek defender Takis Fyssas. Deco then fell to the ground in the penalty area and appealed to the referee for a penalty, but it was not given. Five minutes into the second half, Glendenning wrote that Greece's defence looked "completely impenetrable". Maniche then had an opportunity to shoot outside the penalty area on 53 minutes, but Giannakopoulos tackled him before he could shoot. Greece won their first corner of the match on 57 minutes, which Basinas took, sending the ball into the Portuguese penalty area. It was met by Charisteas around 8 yards (7 m) from goal; he sent a powerful header past Ricardo to give Greece the lead. Journalist Matthew Gibbs of These Football Times later described the goal as "practically a carbon copy" of Greece's headed winners against France and the Czech Republic in the quarter-final and semi-final, opining that Portugal's defence should have prepared for it.

Ronaldo had a chance to equalise shortly after the Greece goal, shooting from 20 yards (18 m), but it was saved by Nikopolidis. They had another chance with a free kick, but it was struck over the Greek crossbar. Portugal's manager Luiz Felipe Scolari brought on Rui Costa in place of Costinha. Then, on 63 minutes, Figo ran with the ball into the Greek penalty area. He attempted a shot at goal, but Nikopolidis prevented it going in. He then sent the ball upfield for a Greek counter-attack; Zagorakis passed it over the top of the Portuguese defenders into the path of two attackers but Ricardo prevented them reaching the ball. On 67 minutes, a Portuguese free kick from the right was claimed by Nikopolidis in the air. Glendenning queried whether Portugal should have had a penalty during the attack, as a Greek player had his arms wrapped around Andrade, but nothing was given. Ronaldo had what McNulty described as his best chance of the match on 74 minutes, when he was through on goal with only the goalkeeper to beat. He ran wide with the ball, and when Nikopolidis ran towards him, he hit his shot over the crossbar. Maniche had a shot on goal from distance on 80 minutes; Nikopolidis parried the shot, but no Portugal attackers were available to collect the rebound. Shortly before the end, Figo took a shot on the turn from inside the Greek box, which went narrowly wide, and Andrade had an attempt with a header which went over the crossbar. Greece held on to complete a 1–0 victory.

=== Details ===
4 July 2004
19:45 WEST

| Portugal | 0–1 | Greece |
|---|---|---|
| | Report | Charisteas 57' |

Estádio da Luz, Lisbon
Attendance: 62,865
Referee: Markus Merk (Germany)

| Portugal | Greece |

| GK | 1 | Ricardo |
| RB | 13 | Miguel | | (substituted off) 43' |
| CB | 4 | Jorge Andrade |
| CB | 16 | Ricardo Carvalho |
| LB | 14 | Nuno Valente | (yellow card) 90+3' |
| CM | 18 | Maniche |
| CM | 6 | Costinha | (yellow card) 12' | (substituted off) 60' |
| RW | 17 | Cristiano Ronaldo |
| AM | 20 | Deco |
| LW | 7 | Luís Figo (c) |
| CF | 9 | Pauleta | | (substituted off) 74' |
Substitutions:
| DF | 2 | Paulo Ferreira | | (substituted on) 43' |
| MF | 10 | Rui Costa | | (substituted on) 60' |
| FW | 21 | Nuno Gomes | | (substituted on) 74' |
Manager:
(Brazil) Luiz Felipe Scolari

| GK | 1 | Antonios Nikopolidis |
| RB | 2 | Giourkas Seitaridis | (yellow card) 63' |
| CB | 19 | Michalis Kapsis |
| CB | 5 | Traianos Dellas |
| LB | 14 | Takis Fyssas | (yellow card) 67' |
| DM | 21 | Kostas Katsouranis |
| CM | 7 | Theodoros Zagorakis (c) |
| CM | 6 | Angelos Basinas | (yellow card) 45+2' |
| RW | 9 | Angelos Charisteas |
| LW | 8 | Stelios Giannakopoulos | | (substituted off) 76' |
| CF | 15 | Zisis Vryzas | | (substituted off) 81' |
Substitutions:
| DF | 3 | Stylianos Venetidis | | (substituted on) 76' |
| FW | 22 | Dimitrios Papadopoulos | (yellow card) 85' | (substituted on) 81' |
Manager:
(Germany) Otto Rehhagel

Man of the Match:
Theodoros Zagorakis (Greece)

Assistant referees:
Christian Schräer (Germany)
Jan-Hendrik Salver (Germany)
Fourth official:
Anders Frisk (Sweden)

Match rules

- 90 minutes
- 30 minutes of silver goal extra time if necessary
- Penalty shoot-out if scores still level
- Maximum of three substitutions

=== Statistics ===
Overall
| Statistic | Portugal | Greece |
|---|---|---|
| Goals scored | 0 | 1 |
| Total shots | 17 | 4 |
| Shots on target | 5 | 1 |
| Ball possession | 58% | 42% |
| Corner kicks | 10 | 1 |
| Fouls committed | 18 | 19 |
| Offsides | 4 | 3 |
| Yellow cards | 2 | 4 |
| Red cards | 0 | 0 |

== Post-match ==
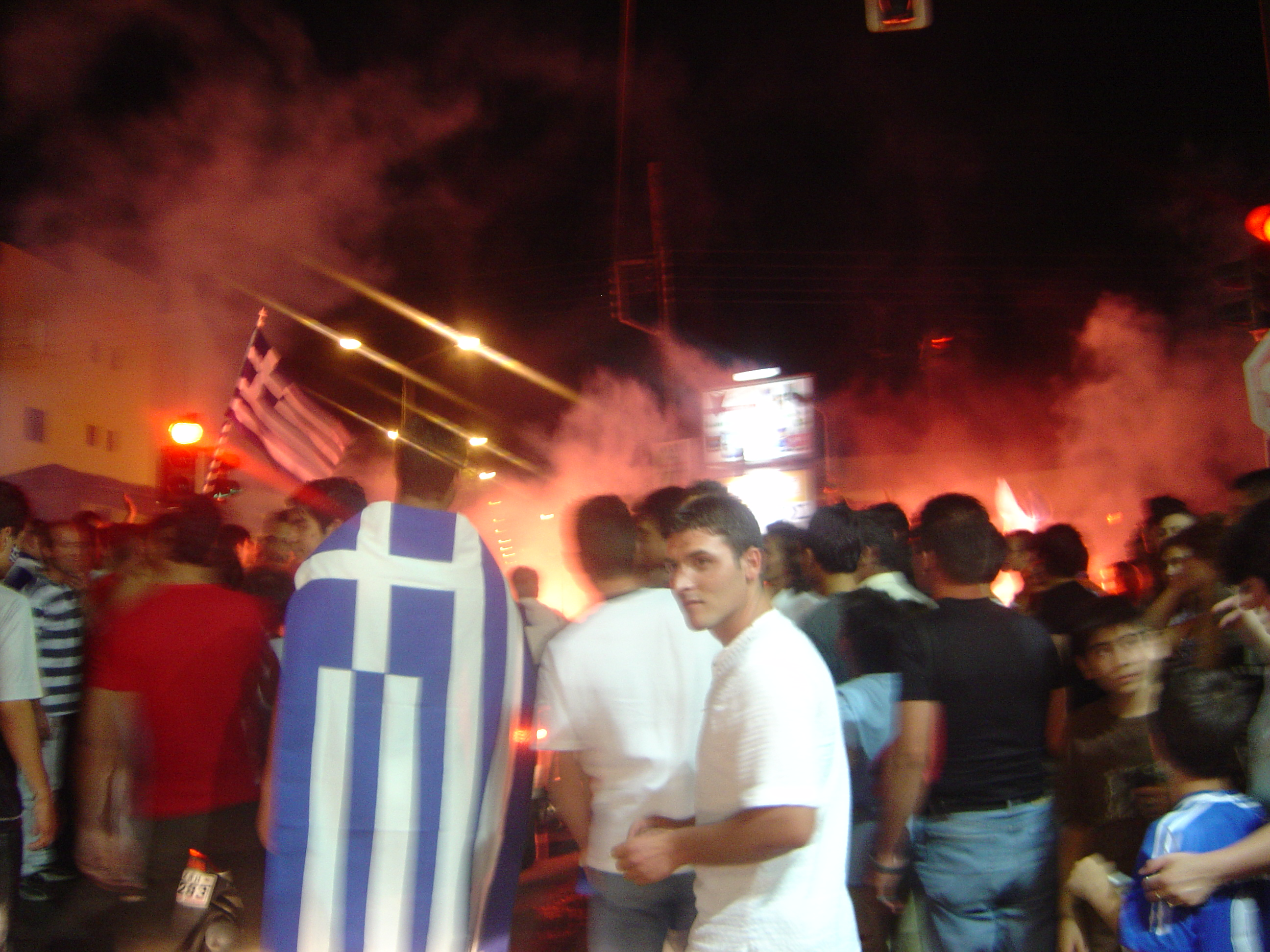
Greeks celebrating the Euro 2004 victory

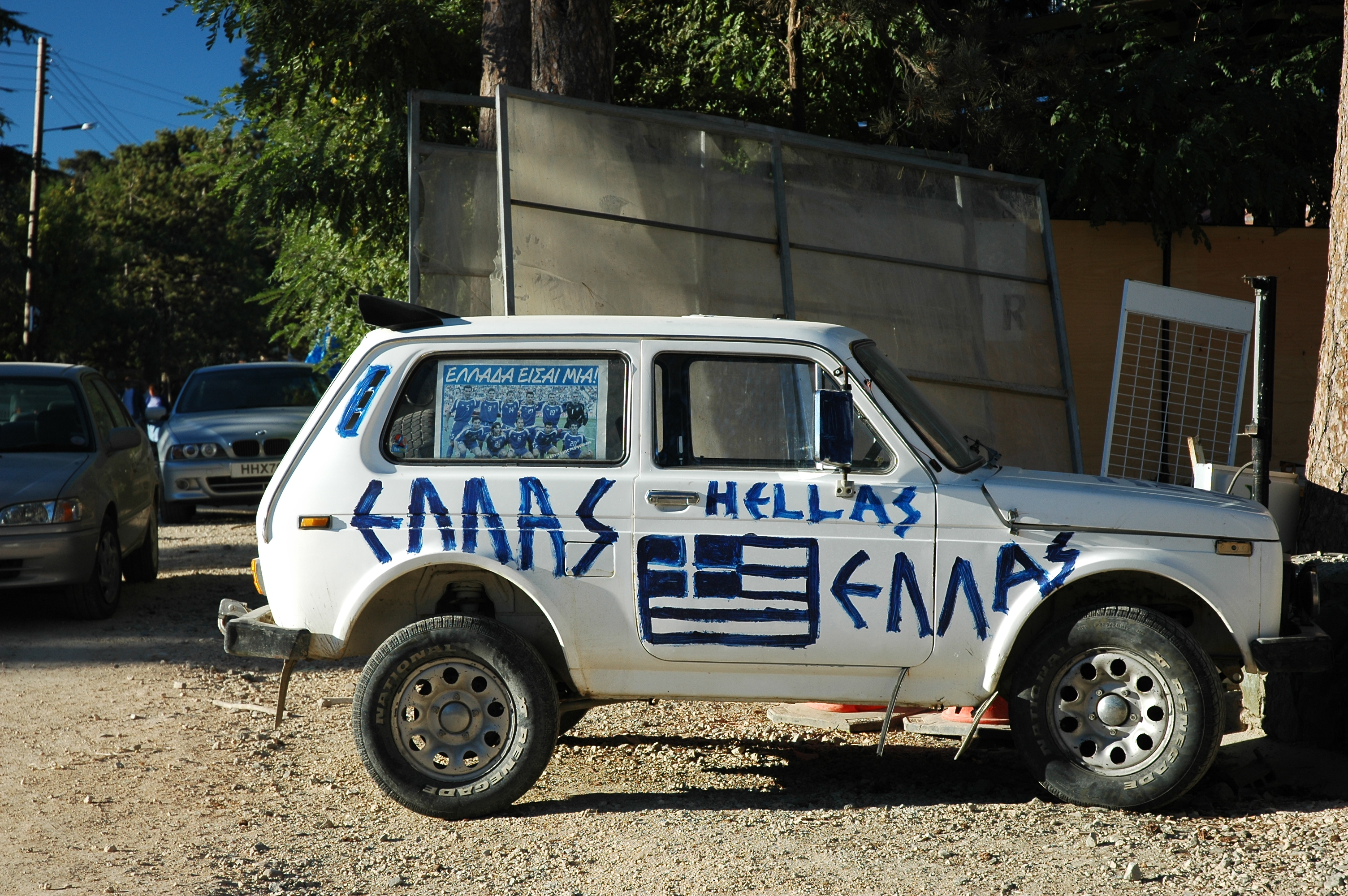
A car painted to celebrate Greece's victory, in the Troodos Mountains, Cyprus, August 2004.

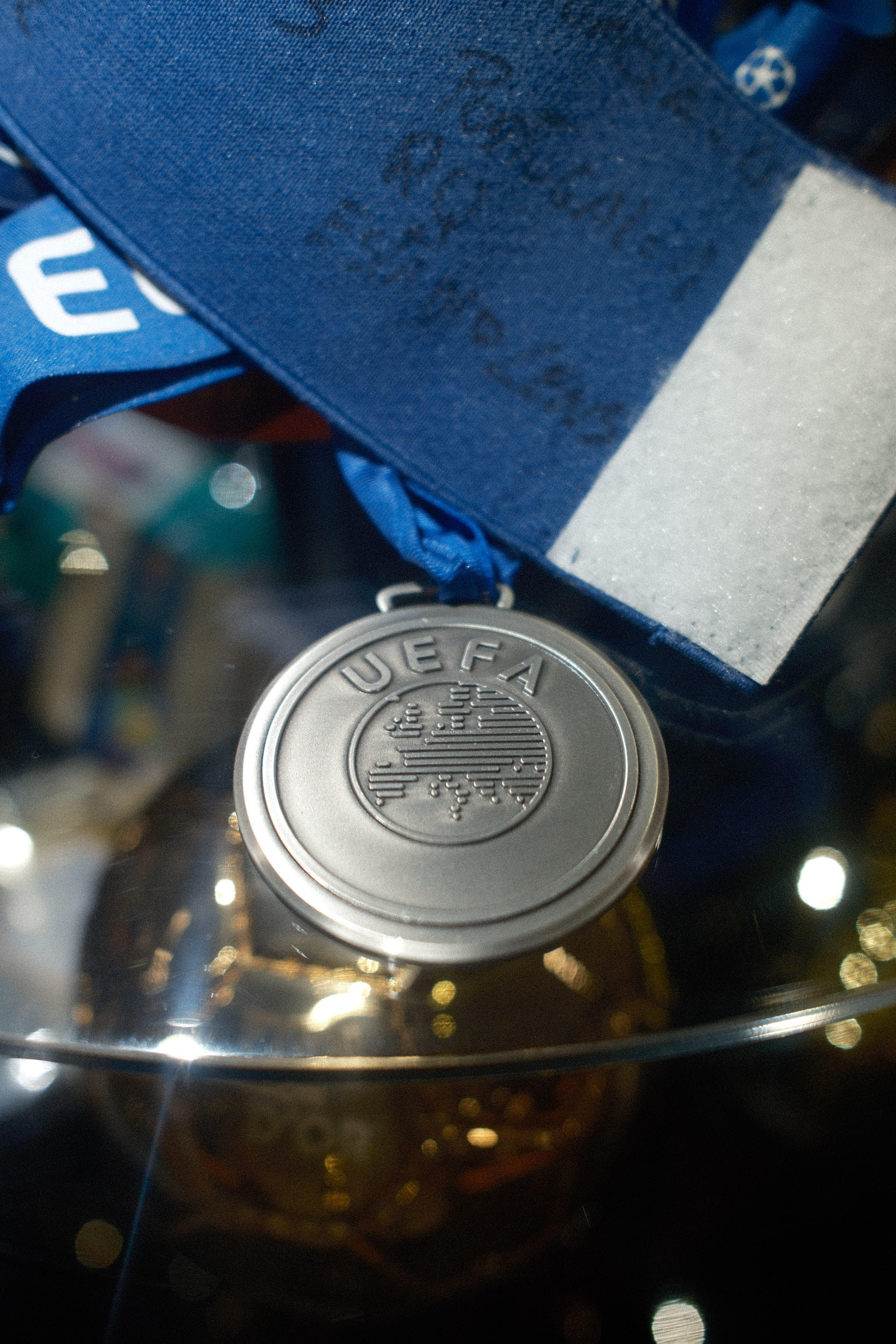
2004 UEFA Euro runner-up medal on display in the Museu CR7.

After the match, BBC Sport's John May labelled Greece's victory as the most surprising tournament win in European Championship history, ahead of Denmark's at Euro 1992. May cited Greece's record of never having previously won a match at a major event, as well as their pre-tournament odds, which were as long as 150–1 with some bookmakers. In 2020, Gibbs similarly labelled it the greatest upset in the tournament's history, writing "They entered this grand stage as underdogs but calling the final result a shock almost does them an injustice in reality." Gibbs noted that the calibre of Euro 2004's teams was high; several of the teams were experiencing a golden generation, and "future icons" such as Ronaldo and England's Wayne Rooney made their first appearances at a major tournament. Writers in France's Le Parisien wrote that the Greeks were "heroes of modern mythology who entered into legend and broke the hearts of all of Portugal", and Spain's Marca commented on Greece's style of play, saying "all winners deserve to win and although the debate as to whether they played football or anti-football is valid, the only thing that matters here is winning".

Greece's German manager Otto Rehhagel became the first person to coach a nation other than his own to victory in the UEFA European Championship. He said after the game that "it was an unusual achievement for Greek football and especially for European football". He accepted that Portugal had been the better team technically, but that Greece had won as a result of taking their chances in the game. Charisteas said "We're the best team in Europe and we deserved it", going on to add that it was a "unique moment, which many of us may never experience again". Zagorakis was named as man of the match, and was also given the player-of-the-tournament award by UEFA. Gérard Houllier, one of the decision-makers for the latter award, commented that "Throughout the tournament, as well as in the final against Portugal, he showed leadership quality and skill and technical ability as well as his character". When interviewed, Zagorakis said "I want to congratulate the players. We proved once again that the Greek soul is, and always will be, our strength." After returning home on 5 July, Greece's players held a celebration in the Panathenaic Stadium, and more than 100,000 supporters assembled on the streets between the airport and the stadium to welcome them back. Alluding to construction delays for the upcoming Olympic Games in Athens, Prime Minister Kostas Karamanlis said "These boys taught us a lesson as to what Greeks can do when we really believe in something".

Portugal manager Scolari expressed his pain at the result, saying that Greece were the better team and lamenting that Portugal had been beaten by "one piece of sloppy defending". He was upbeat about the future, labelling his side "European vice-champions" and predicting that they would win a trophy in the future. Greece failed to qualify for the next major tournament, the 2006 FIFA World Cup, and also failed in their defence of the European Championship at Euro 2008, being eliminated in the group stage. Portugal reached the semi-finals of the 2006 World Cup, where they were beaten by France, and the quarter-finals at Euro 2008. They eventually won the European Championship at Euro 2016.

== See also ==
- Greece at the UEFA European Championship
- Portugal at the UEFA European Championship
