= Greece at the FIFA World Cup =

International football delegation

The Greece national football team have appeared in the FIFA World Cup on three occasions, in 1994, 2010 and 2014. They were the reigning European champions when they failed to qualify for the 2006 tournament.

== Overview ==
FIFA World Cup record									FIFA World Cup qualification record					
Year	Round	Position	Pld	W	D*	L	GF	GA	Pld	W	D*	L	GF	GA
(Uruguay) 1930	Did not enter								Did not enter					
(Italy) 1934	Did not qualify								1	0	0	1	0	4
(France) 1938	Did not qualify								3	2	0	1	5	12
(Brazil) 1950	Did not enter								Did not enter					
(Switzerland) 1954	Did not qualify								4	2	0	2	3	2
(Sweden) 1958	Did not qualify								4	0	1	3	2	9
(Chile) 1962	Did not qualify								4	1	0	3	3	8
(England) 1966	Did not qualify								6	2	1	3	10	14
(Mexico) 1970	Did not qualify								6	2	3	1	13	9
(West Germany) 1974	Did not qualify								4	0	0	4	5	11
(Argentina) 1978	Did not qualify								4	1	1	2	2	6
(Spain) 1982	Did not qualify								8	3	1	4	10	13
(Mexico) 1986	Did not qualify								6	1	2	3	5	10
(Italy) 1990	Did not qualify								6	1	2	3	3	15
(United States) 1994	Group stage	24th	3	0	0	3	0	10	8	6	2	0	10	2
(France) 1998	Did not qualify								8	4	2	2	11	4
(South Korea) (Japan) 2002	Did not qualify								8	2	1	5	7	17
(Germany) 2006	Did not qualify								12	6	3	3	15	9
(South Africa) 2010	Group stage	25th	3	1	0	2	2	5	12	7	3	2	21	10
(Brazil) 2014	Round of 16	13th	4	1	2	1	3	5	12	9	2	1	16	6
(Russia) 2018	Did not qualify								12	5	5	2	18	10
(Qatar) 2022	Did not qualify								8	2	4	2	8	8
(Canada) (Mexico) (United States) 2026	Did not qualify								4	1	0	3	7	10
(Morocco) (Portugal) (Spain) 2030	To be determined								To be determined					
(Saudi Arabia) 2034	To be determined								To be determined					
Total	Best: Round of 16	3/23	10	2	2	6	5	20	140	57	33	50	174	189

^{*} Draws include knockout matches decided via penalty shoot-out.

Greece's World Cup record
First match	Argentina 4–0 Greece (Foxborough, United States; 21 June 1994)
Biggest win	Greece 2–1 Nigeria (Bloemfontein, South Africa; 17 June 2010); Greece 2–1 Ivory Coast (Fortaleza, Brazil; 24 June 2014)
Biggest defeat	Argentina 4–0 Greece (Foxborough, United States; 21 June 1994); Bulgaria 4–0 Greece (Chicago, United States; 26 June 1994)
Best result	Round of 16 at the 2014 FIFA World Cup
Worst result	Group Stage at the 1994 and 2010 FIFA World Cup

== 1994 United States ==
The 1994 World Cup marked the country's first appearance in the finals. Greece qualified through a 1–1 draw with Russia. Public interest in football was high leading up to the tournament, but soured after the team failed to score in the three group stage matches.

=== Group stage ===
Pos	Team	Pld	W	D	L	GF	GA	GD	Pts	Qualification
1	Nigeria	3	2	0	1	6	2	+4	6	Advance to knockout stage
2	Bulgaria	3	2	0	1	6	3	+3	6 (Note: Head-to-head result: Argentina 0–2 Bulgaria.)	Advance to knockout stage
3	Argentina	3	2	0	1	6	3	+3	6	Advance to knockout stage
4	Greece	3	0	0	3	0	10	−10	0	

Source: FIFA
Notes:

Win Tie Loss

21 June 1994	Argentina	4–0	Greece	Boston, United States
12:30	Batistuta 2', 44', 89' (pen.); Maradona 60'	Report		Stadium: Foxboro Stadium; Attendance: 54,456; Referee: Arturo Angeles (United States)

26 June 1994	Bulgaria	4–0	Greece	Chicago, United States
12:30	Stoichkov 5' (pen.), 55' (pen.); Letchkov 65'; Borimirov 90'	Report		Stadium: Soldier Field; Attendance: 63,160; Referee: Ali Bujsaim (United Arab Emirates)

30 June 1994	Greece	0–2	Nigeria	Boston, United States
19:30		Report	George 45'; Amokachi 90'	Stadium: Foxboro Stadium; Attendance: 53,001; Referee: Leslie Mottram (Scotland)

== 2010 South Africa ==
=== Round 1 ===
Pos	Team	Pld	W	D	L	GF	GA	GD	Pts	Qualification
1	Argentina	3	3	0	0	7	1	+6	9	Advance to knockout stage
2	South Korea	3	1	1	1	5	6	−1	4	Advance to knockout stage
3	Greece	3	1	0	2	2	5	−3	3	
4	Nigeria	3	0	1	2	3	5	−2	1	

Source: FIFA
Rules for classification: Tie-breaking criteria

Win Tie Loss

12 June 2010	South Korea	2–0	Greece	Port Elizabeth, South Africa
13:30	Lee Jung-soo 7'; Park Ji-sung 52'	Report		Stadium: Nelson Mandela Bay Stadium; Attendance: 31,513; Referee: Michael Hester (New Zealand)

17 June 2010	Greece	2–1	Nigeria	Bloemfontein, South Africa
16:00	Salpingidis 44'; Torosidis 71'	Report	Uche 16'	Stadium: Free State Stadium; Attendance: 31,593; Referee: Óscar Ruiz (Colombia)

22 June 2010	Greece	0–2	Argentina	Polokwane, South Africa
20:30		Report	Demichelis 77'; Palermo 89'	Stadium: Peter Mokaba Stadium; Attendance: 38,891; Referee: Ravshan Irmatov (Uzbekistan

== 2014 Brazil ==
=== Group stage ===
Pos	Team	Pld	W	D	L	GF	GA	GD	Pts	Qualification
1	Colombia	3	3	0	0	9	2	+7	9	Advance to knockout stage
2	Greece	3	1	1	1	2	4	−2	4	Advance to knockout stage
3	Ivory Coast	3	1	0	2	4	5	−1	3	
4	Japan	3	0	1	2	2	6	−4	1	

Source: FIFA
Rules for classification: Tie-breaking criteria

Win Tie Loss

14 June 2014	Colombia	3–0	Greece	Belo Horizonte, Brazil
13:00	Armero 5'; Gutiérrez 58'; Rodríguez 90+3'	Report		Stadium: Estádio Mineirão; Attendance: 57,174; Referee: Mark Geiger (United States)

19 June 2014	Japan	0–0	Greece	Natal, Brazil
19:00		Report		Stadium: Arena das Dunas; Attendance: 39,485; Referee: Joel Aguilar (El Salvador)

24 June 2014	Greece	2–1	Ivory Coast	Fortaleza, Brazil
17:00	Samaris 42'; Samaras 90+3' (pen.)	Report	Bony 74'	Stadium: Estádio Castelão; Attendance: 59,095; Referee: Carlos Vera (Ecuador)

=== Knockout stage ===
Win Tie Loss

29 June 2014 Round of 16	Costa Rica	1–1 (a.e.t.) (5–3 p)	Greece	Recife, Brazil
17:00	Ruiz 52'	Report	Papastathopoulos 90+1'	Stadium: Arena Pernambuco; Attendance: 41,242; Referee: Ben Williams (Australia)
	Penalties
	Borges (penalty scored); Ruiz (penalty scored); González (penalty scored); Campbell (penalty scored); Umaña (penalty scored)		(penalty scored) Mitroglou; (penalty scored) Christodoulopoulos; (penalty scored) Holebas; (penalty missed) Gekas

== Player records ==
=== Most appearances ===
Rank	Player	Matches	World Cups
1	Giorgos Karagounis	7	2010 and 2014
1	Georgios Samaras	7	2010 and 2014
1	Vasilis Torosidis	7	2010 and 2014
4	Theofanis Gekas	6	2010 and 2014
4	Kostas Katsouranis	6	2010 and 2014
4	Sokratis Papastathopoulos	6	2010 and 2014
4	Dimitris Salpingidis	6	2010 and 2014
8	José Holebas	4	2014
8	Orestis Karnezis	4	2014
8	Giannis Maniatis	4	2014
8	Kostas Manolas	4	2014

=== Goalscorers ===
Five players each scored one goal for Greece at a FIFA World Cup.

Rank	Player	Goals	World Cup
1	Dimitris Salpingidis	1	2010
1	Vasilis Torosidis	1	2010
1	Sokratis Papastathopoulos	1	2014
1	Georgios Samaras	1	2014
1	Andreas Samaris	1	2014

== Head-to-head record ==
Opponent	Pld	W	D	L	GF	GA	GD	Win %
Argentina	2	0	0	2	0	6	−6	0.00
Bulgaria	1	0	0	1	0	4	−4	0.00
Colombia	1	0	0	1	0	3	−3	0.00
Nigeria	2	1	0	1	2	3	−1	50.00
Costa Rica	1	0	1	0	1	1	+0	0.00
Ivory Coast	1	1	0	0	2	1	+1	100.00
Japan	1	0	1	0	0	0	+0	0.00
South Korea	1	0	0	1	0	2	−2	0.00
Total	10	2	2	6	5	20	−15	20.00

== See also ==
- Greece at the FIFA Confederations Cup
- Greece at the UEFA European Championship
