= Greece at the FIFA Confederations Cup =

Football tournament results

The Greece national football team represented Greece at the FIFA Confederations Cup on one occasion, a sole appearance in 2005.Greece qualified for the 2005 FIFA Confederations Cup as the UEFA representative after winning UEFA Euro 2004.

== Record at the FIFA Confederations Cup ==
FIFA Confederations Cup record
Year	Result	Position	Pld	W	D	L	GF	GA
(Saudi Arabia) 1992	Did not qualify							
(Saudi Arabia) 1995	Did not qualify							
(Saudi Arabia) 1997	Did not qualify							
(Mexico) 1999	Did not qualify							
(South Korea) (Japan) 2001	Did not qualify							
(France) 2003	Did not qualify							
(Germany) 2005	Group stage	7th	3	0	1	2	0	4
(South Africa) 2009	Did not qualify							
(Brazil) 2013	Did not qualify							
(Russia) 2017	Did not qualify							
Total	1/10	0 Titles	9	0	1	2	0	4

== 2005 FIFA Confederations Cup ==
=== Group A ===
Team	Pld	W	D	L	GF	GA	GD	Pts
Mexico	3	2	1	0	3	1	+2	7
Brazil	3	1	1	1	5	3	+2	4
Japan	3	1	1	1	4	4	0	4
Greece	3	0	1	2	0	4	–4	1

16 June 2005
20:45 CEST

Brazil	3 – 0	Greece
Adriano 41'; Robinho 46'; Juninho 81'	(Report)

Zentralstadion, Leipzig
Attendance: 42,507
Referee: Ľuboš Micheľ (Slovakia)

19 June 2005
18:00 CEST

Greece	0 – 1	Japan
	(Report)	76' Oguro

Waldstadion, Frankfurt
Attendance: 34,314
Referee: Herbert Fandel (Germany)

22 June 2005
20:45 CEST

Greece	0 – 0	Mexico

Waldstadion, Frankfurt
Attendance: 44,337
Referee: Carlos Amarilla (Paraguay)

== See also ==
- Greece at the FIFA World Cup
- Greece at the UEFA European Championship
