= Vasilis Torosidis =

Greek footballer (born 1985)

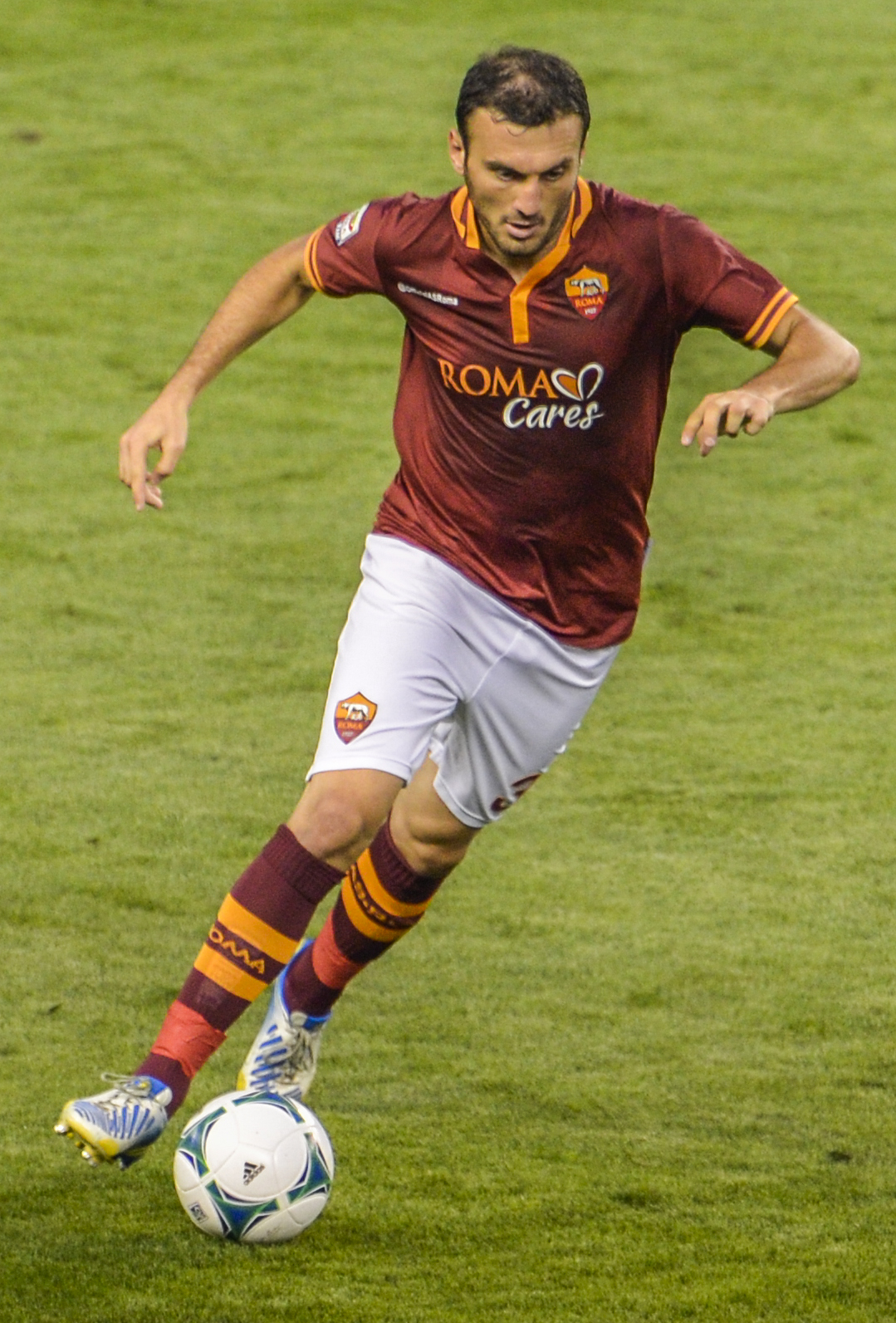
- Torosidis with Roma in 2013

Personal information
- Full name: Vasilios Torosidis
- Date of birth: 10 June 1985 (age 41)
- Place of birth: Xanthi, Greece
- Height: 1.86 m (6 ft 1 in)
- Position: Right-back

Youth career
- Skoda Xanthi

Senior career*
Years	Team	Apps	(Gls)
2002–2007	Skoda Xanthi	76	(3)
2007–2013	Olympiacos	134	(12)
2013–2016	Roma	60	(4)
2016–2018	Bologna	44	(1)
2018–2020	Olympiacos	19	(0)
Total		333	(20)

International career
2007–2019	Greece	101	(10)
- * Club domestic league appearances and goals

Vasilis Torosidis (Greek: Βασίλης Τοροσίδης, born 10 June 1985) is a Greek former professional footballer who played as a right-back.

== Club career ==
=== Skoda Xanthi ===
Torosidis made his senior debut for Skoda Xanthi on 19 April 2003 at the age of 17 and scored his first goal in the Super League against Iraklis on 17 October 2005. Having made 76 impressive appearances for the club during a five-year stint, Torosidis drew the attention of the top Greek clubs AEK Athens, Olympiacos and Panathinaikos. He eventually joined Olympiacos on a five-year deal on 1 January 2007.

=== Olympiacos ===
Torosidis moved to Olympiacos in January 2007 and scored his first goal with the team against PAOK on 21 January 2007. He scored his first European goal for Olympiacos in the 2008–09 UEFA Cup 1st round 5–0 home leg win against FC Nordsjælland and scored another one in the competition's Group Stage 4–0 home win against Hertha BSC.

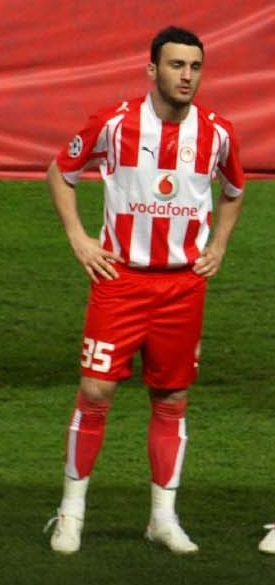
Torosidis with Olympiacos in 2008

Torosidis signed a renewed contract with Olympiacos in the summer of 2009 until 31 June 2013, which included a buy-out fee of €7 million. He was monitored by such clubs as Newcastle United, Roma, Juventus, Atlético Madrid, and Bayern Munich.

On 24 February 2011, Olympiacos was forced to play one game behind closed doors after supporters invaded the pitch and attacked some of the Panathinaikos players at the end of their controversial home win in the Athens derby took place on 19 February. Torosidis was also given a five-game ban by the Super League Greece following his sending off for headbutting midfielder Sebastian Leto in the closing stages of the match. The punishments were handed down on Thursday after hundreds of fans invaded the pitch following the league leaders' tempestuous 2–1 win that took them ten points clear of their local rivals with just seven matches to play. Some Olympiakos supporters threw punches and kicks at the visiting players and battled with police.

In January 2013, Torosidis refused to sign a new deal with the Greek champions after moving to the Athens outfit in 2007. Martin Jol, manager of Fulham F.C. was linked with a move for the Torosidis, who was believed to be available for around £500,000. The Fulham boss snapped up Giorgos Karagounis on a free transfer in the summer – and Torosidis is desperate for a fresh challenge in a different European league. "I’m not going to sign a new deal," Torosidis told the Sun newspaper. "I want to move abroad." On 22 January 2013, he moved from Olympiacos to Roma, signing a contract with the Roman club expiring on 31 June 2015.

=== Roma ===
On 23 January 2013, Torosidis moved to Italian Serie A side Roma for €400,000 and signed a contract valid until 30 June 2015, with the option to stay for the 2015–16 season. The Italian club had beaten Fulham, who had also expressed interest in Torosidis. Olympiakos had been keen to sell the versatile defender this month in order to risk losing him for nothing at the end of the season. Roma's sporting director Sabatini in his introduction speech said: "He is an experienced player and has spent a long time playing for the best team in Greece, Olympiakos. He played over three hundred league matches for them as well as quite a few appearances in European competition and for Greece. I'm grateful to him for choosing Roma over the other offers he received. "What memories do I have of him? One above all else. When he made a major contribution to beating Lazio and eliminating them from the Champions League here in the Stadio Olimpico a few years back."

He made his debut against Bologna in a 3–3 draw. He scored his first goal for Roma in a 2–3 away win over Atalanta. He also scored in the Coppa Italia semi-final match against Internazionale with a great strike right in Inter goalkeeper Handanovič's top corner. The match ended 2–3, with Roma securing a position in the 2013 Coppa Italia Final against Lazio, where they subsequently lost.

On 9 January 2014, with a very early Vasilis Torosidis goal, Roma labored to a 1–0 victory over Sampdoria in the Coppa Italia to help shake off the 3–0 league loss against Juventus last weekend. It was indubitably important for Roma to get over their first defeat of the season as quickly as possible, and to that end, Rudi Garcia sent out a side that was a mixture of first team players, fringe players, and youngsters. On 17 March 2014, Torosidis scored as Roma beat Udinese Calcio to maintain their grip on second place from Juventus in Serie A and restored the two-goal margin before Dusan Basta of Udinese ensured a nervous final 10 minutes for Roma.

On 2 August 2014, Roma announced that Torosidis had signed a new contract with the Giallorossi, keeping him at the club until 2017. The 29-year-old, who represented his country at this summer's World Cup in Brazil, explained his reasons for staying at Stadio Olimpico at a Press conference. "My future is at Roma, I signed for three years. I’m staying at Roma because they’re a big club with big targets and I want to win something with this team. We are a strong team with players of a great level. We want to win the Scudetto but it is not easy. It will be a season with a lot of matches. We need to be humble and ready for the season. All the fans are expecting a strong team and that's what we are. We want to win the Scudetto. There will be a lot of difficult matches, there are teams like Juventus, Napoli and Fiorentina. We will see." Torosidis told reporters. On 16 May 2015, in a game for Serie A against Udinese Calcio, the Giallorossi defeated the Zebrette 2–1, in which Torosidis got the winning goal to get the side three points, but the Greek international is not taking any credit for the win.

On 29 September 2015, he scored his first goal with his left-foot like a real poacher, for the 2015–16 season in a 3–2 away loss against FC BATE Borisov in the UEFA Champions League, when with 8 minutes left he netted the Italian side's second after converting from close range. Torosidis suffered a lot of injuries during the season and he was forced to cut training after he has been diagnosed with a Grade I tear of the left calf muscle, eventually losing his place in the starting XI. According to newspapers, La Liga side Málaga CF are interested in the Greek defender, who is not in the plans of Luciano Spalletti and consequently is in A.S. Roma summer transfer list. Roma have been searching for an alternative at right-back as it appears the Greek's place in the Giallorossi side has not been confirmed.

=== Bologna ===
On 31 August 2016, the last available day in the Italian summer transfer window, Torosidis moved to Bologna for €1 million and signed a contract valid until 30 June 2018, with the option to stay for the 2018–19 season, as two weeks earlier has turned down an offer by Torino. On 11 September 2016, he made his first appearance with the club as a substitute in a 2–1 home win against Cagliari Calcio.

On 11 October 2016, Torosidis added to the growing injury worries of the club after being substituted only 18 minutes into his country's 2–0 World Cup qualifying away win against Estonia. The international left-back and captain of the Greece national team, who has played as a starter in all of his side's competitive matches this season, now seems likely to miss the next 15 days after suffering an apparent muscle injury. On 23 October 2016, he returned to the squad as a starter in a 1–1 home win draw against U.S. Sassuolo Calcio. On 14 January 2017, he replaced due to an injury only 27 minutes into his club 1–0 away win against F.C. Crotone. On 4 February 2017, he scored his first goal with the club in a disaster 7–1 home loss against Napoli. On 26 February 2017, in a 1–1 away draw against Genoa, made no attempt to play the ball when tripping Giovanni Simeone from behind on the edge of the box, facing a red card leaving his club to 10-men.

He started the 2017–18 season as a starter. In his second league game against Benevento Calcio he suffered a thigh injury and has been replaced. On 22 October 2017, in his fifth match in Serie A against Atalanta B.C. he suffered a muscle injury and has been replaced. On 25 November 2017, he faced two yellow cards in the last two minutes of the first half, leaving his team with ten players without luckily to create a problem as his club prevailed with 3–0 against Sampdoria. Since the beginning of 2018, Torosidis faced a numerous of hamstring injuries as well as a muscle fatigue that kept him out of the squad for almost 1.5 months. On 5 April 2018, he completed Bologna's training and seem ready to return in action. On 1 July 2018, he mutually solved his contract with the club.

=== Return to Olympiacos ===
On 28 July 2018, following a five-year spell in Italy, Torosidis has returned to his homeland, penning a contract with former club Olympiacos. The length of his Olympiacos contract was not stipulated. On 25 October 2018, Kostas Fortounis stood over a corner kick, expertly sent a looping cross towards the area, and experienced defender was on hand to head into the right corner, giving the lead in a 2–0 away UEFA Europa League group stage against F91 Dudelange. After scoring the winning goal for Olympiacos against Dudelange, defender Vasilis Torosidis has been included in the UEFA Europa League team of the week. On 1 November 2018, he opened the score in a 2–0 away Greek Cup win against Panachaiki. It was his first goal with the club in the 2018–19 season. A week later, he scored with a left footed shot from very close range to the bottom right corner, after an assist from Mady Camara following a corner in a hammering 5–1 win game against F91 Dudelange in the UEFA Europa League group stage.

=== Retirement ===
On 13 September 2020, Torosidis officially announced his retirement from professional football, after the end of the 2019–20 Greek Football Cup which he won 1–0 against AEK as the team leader.

== International career ==
=== Greece ===
Torosidis made his international debut for the Greece national team in a UEFA Euro 2008 qualifier against Turkey. After Takis Fyssas' retirement, Torosidis became Greece's first-choice left-back, despite playing at right-back for his club. Following the qualifiers, Torosidis was selected in the Greek squad for Euro 2008. He scored his first international goal in a 2010 FIFA World Cup qualifier against Luxembourg.

On 18 June 2010, Nigeria midfielder Sani Kaita lashed out with a kick to his thigh, resulting with Kaita being shown a straight red card. Thereafter, he scored the crucial goal in Greece's World Cup Group Stage match against Nigeria which gave his country a 2–1 win, their first ever win at a World Cup.

Torosidis' own goal in a 1–1 draw with Romania, scored when a defensive clearance rebounded off him, did not prevent Greece securing qualification for the 2014 World Cup. It was just the third qualification of the Greece national team to a World Cup and the second consecutive of Torosidis. From his debut in the national team in 2007, Greece have never lost a rendezvous in a major competition (UEFA Euro 2008 and 2012, 2010 and 2014 FIFA World Cup) along with his teammates he wrote the described by many as the "Golden Era" of Greek football.

On 10 October 2017, he scored his 10th international goal at home clash against Gibraltar. The 32-year-old footballer became the first defender in the history of Greece national team to score ten international goals, five of which were headers.

== Career statistics ==
=== Club ===
Appearances and goals by club, season and competition
Club	Season	League			Cup		Continental^{[A]}		Other		Total	
Club	Season	Division	Apps	Goals	Apps	Goals	Apps	Goals	Apps	Goals	Apps	Goals
Skoda Xanthi	2002–03	Alpha Ethniki	4	0	–		–		–		4	0
Skoda Xanthi	2003–04	Alpha Ethniki	16	0	1	0	–		–		17	0
Skoda Xanthi	2004–05	Alpha Ethniki	20	0	2	1	–		–		22	1
Skoda Xanthi	2005–06	Alpha Ethniki	24	2	1	0	2	0	–		27	2
Skoda Xanthi	2006–07	Super League Greece	12	1	1	0	1	0	–		14	1
Skoda Xanthi	Total		76	3	5	1	3	0	–		84	4
Olympiacos	2006–07	Super League Greece	11	1	–		–		–		11	1
Olympiacos	2007–08	Super League Greece	26	1	4	1	7	0	1 (Note: Appearance in Greek Super Cup)	0	38	2
Olympiacos	2008–09	Super League Greece	19	2	3	0	9	2	–		31	4
Olympiacos	2009–10	Super League Greece	24	4	5	1	4	1	–		33	6
Olympiacos	2010–11	Super League Greece	20	3	2	0	1	0	–		23	3
Olympiacos	2011–12	Super League Greece	22	0	4	0	8	0	–		34	0
Olympiacos	2012–13	Super League Greece	12	1	1	1	5	1	–		18	3
Olympiacos	Total		134	12	19	3	34	4	1	0	188	19
Roma	2012–13	Serie A	11	1	1	1	–		–		12	2
Roma	2013–14	Serie A	18	1	4	1	–		–		22	2
Roma	2014–15	Serie A	20	2	0	0	8	0	–		28	2
Roma	2015–16	Serie A	11	0	0	0	4	1	–		15	1
Roma	Total		60	4	5	2	12	1	–		77	7
Bologna	2016–17	Serie A	28	1	0	0	0	0	–		28	1
Bologna	2017–18	Serie A	16	0	1	0	0	0	–		17	0
Bologna	Total		44	1	1	0	0	0	–		45	1
Olympiacos	2018–19	Super League Greece	13	0	3	1	9	2	–		25	3
Olympiacos	2019–20	Super League Greece	6	0	3	1	2	0	–		11	1
Olympiacos	Total		19	0	6	2	11	2	–		36	4
Career total			333	20	36	8	60	7	1	0	430	35

A. Includes appearances in the UEFA Champions League and UEFA Europa League.

=== International ===
Appearances and goals by national team and year
National team	Year	Apps	Goals
Greece
Greece	2007	9	0
Greece	2008	11	1
Greece	2009	5	1
Greece	2010	9	2
Greece	2011	8	1
Greece	2012	12	2
Greece	2013	9	0
Greece	2014	12	0
Greece	2015	4	0
Greece	2016	10	2
Greece	2017	5	1
Greece	2018	6	0
Greece	2019	1	0
Total		101	10

Scores and results list Greece's goal tally first, score column indicates score after each Torosidis goal.

International goals by date, venue, cap, opponent, score, result and competition
No.	Date	Venue	Cap	Opponent	Score	Result	Competition
1	6 September 2008	Stade Josy Barthel, Luxembourg City, Luxembourg	17	Luxembourg	1–0	3–0	2010 FIFA World Cup qualification
2	14 October 2009	Olympic Stadium, Athens, Greece	25	Luxembourg	1–0	2–1	2010 FIFA World Cup qualification
3	17 June 2010	Free State Stadium, Bloemfontein, South Africa	28	Nigeria	2–1	2–1	2010 FIFA World Cup
4	8 October 2010	Karaiskakis Stadium, Piraeus, Greece	33	Latvia	1–0	1–0	UEFA Euro 2012 qualifying
5	26 March 2011	Ta' Qali National Stadium, Ta' Qali, Malta	36	Malta	1–0	1–0	UEFA Euro 2012 qualifying
6	26 May 2012	Kufstein Arena, Kufstein, Austria	44	Slovenia	1–0	1–1	Friendly
7	15 August 2012	Ullevaal Stadion, Oslo, Norway	49	Norway	1–0	3–2	Friendly
8	6 September 2016	Estádio Algarve, Faro/Loulé, Portugal	85	Gibraltar	4–1	4–1	2018 FIFA World Cup qualification
9	10 October 2016	A. Le Coq Arena, Tallinn, Estonia	87	Estonia	1–0	2–0	2018 FIFA World Cup qualification
10	10 October 2017	Karaiskakis Stadium, Piraeus, Greece	93	Gibraltar	1–0	4–0	2018 FIFA World Cup qualification

== Honours ==
Olympiacos

- Super League Greece: 2006–07, 2007–08, 2008–09, 2010–11, 2011–12, 2019–20
- Greek Football Cup: 2007–08, 2008–09, 2011–12, 2019–20
- Greek Super Cup: 2007

Individual

- Super League Greece Greek Footballer of the Season: 2009–10
- Super League Greece Team the Season: 2009–10

== See also ==
- List of footballers with more than 100 international caps
