= Angelos Charisteas =

Greek footballer (born 1980)

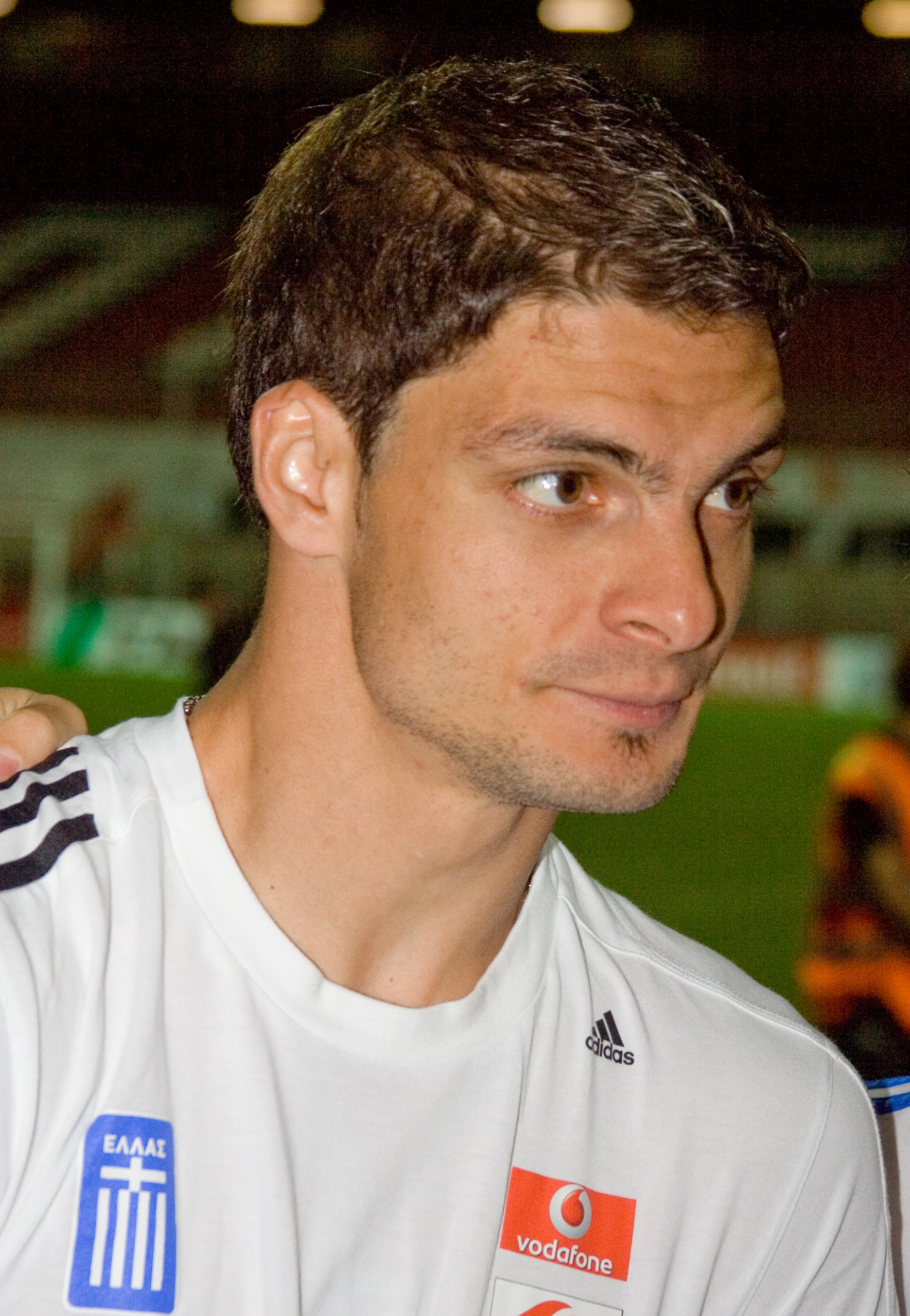
- Charisteas in 2008

Personal information
- Date of birth: 9 February 1980 (age 46)
- Place of birth: Strymoniko, Serres, Greece
- Height: 1.91 m (6 ft 3 in)
- Position: Forward

Youth career
- –1997: Strymon Strymonikos

Senior career*
Years	Team	Apps	(Gls)
1997–2002	Aris	87	(19)
1999	→ Athinaikos (loan)	7	(1)
2002–2005	Werder Bremen	66	(18)
2005–2006	Ajax	31	(12)
2006–2007	Feyenoord	28	(9)
2007–2010	1. FC Nürnberg	57	(8)
2009	→ Bayer Leverkusen (loan)	13	(1)
2010	Arles-Avignon	6	(0)
2011	Schalke 04	4	(1)
2011–2012	Panetolikos	24	(4)
2013	Al-Nassr	7	(1)
Total		330	(74)

International career
2001–2011	Greece	88	(25)
Medal record
Men's football
Representing Greece
UEFA European Championship
Winner	2004
- * Club domestic league appearances and goals

Angelos Charisteas (Greek: Άγγελος Χαριστέας, pronounced [ˈaɲɟelos xariˈste.as]; born 9 February 1980) is a Greek former professional footballer who played as a forward.

At club level he played for Aris Thessaloniki, Werder Bremen, Ajax, Feyenoord, Bayer Leverkusen, Schalke 04, Arles-Avignon, and Al-Nassr. In 2004, he won the double with Werder Bremen, earning Bundesliga and DFB-Pokal medals and was also the club's Sportsman of the Year. With Ajax, Charisteas also won the Dutch Cup and the Dutch Super Cup.

Internationally, he was capped 88 times by Greece, scoring 25 goals. He was a member of the UEFA Euro 2004 winning team, scoring three goals, including the winning goal in the final against the hosts Portugal, which was considered as the greatest triumph of the nation. He also represented Greece at UEFA Euro 2008 and the 2010 FIFA World Cup.

In 2019, Charisteas was also a political deputy in the region of Central Macedonia.

== Club career ==
=== Aris ===
After a few years playing for amateur club Strymon Strymonikos, Charisteas joined Greek side Aris Thessaloniki, where he started his professional career. It was during his first season at Aris that Charisteas started making a name for himself, scoring twice in nine matches as they won the Greek second division in 1997–98. Charisteas started well in his first season in the Greek top league and got further noticed when he scored twice in the local derby against Thessaloniki rivals PAOK. The striker made twelve appearances in the Alpha Ethniki – six as a substitute – before a loan at Athinaikos in 1998–99. He returned to Aris the following season and made his European debut in a UEFA Cup defeat by Celta de Vigo at the age of 19. Charisteas was continuously developing and in the 2000–01 season, where he scored seven goals.

=== Werder Bremen ===
On 29 January 2002, Charisteas joined Bundesliga side Werder Bremen, signing a four-year contract valid from the summer, having been watched by scouts from a number of Europe's leading sides.

Werder Bremen Sporting director, Klaus Allofs attested "Angelos is strong header of the ball, very fast and has good tactical behaviour".

At the club, he scored with regularity between 2002 and 2005.

The transfer fee paid to Aris was reported as €3 million. He had a successful first season scoring nine goals in 31 appearances in the Bundesliga and two goals from four games in the UEFA Cup.

In the 2003–04 season, Werder Bremen won the Bundesliga and the German Cup with Charisteas scoring four goals from 24 appearances.

On 29 September 2004, Charisteas contributed a goal in his side's 2–1 win against Valencia in the Champions League. In total, he scored five goals in 11 matches for Werder Bremen the 2004–05 season.

=== Ajax ===
In December 2004, Charisteas moved to the Netherlands to play for Ajax for a reported fee nearly €5 million. Greece manager Otto Rehhagel had publicly urged Charisteas to try to move to another club during the January 2005 transfer window, in order to get more first-team action. Ajax fitted the bill, as they were hoping to find a replacement for Swedish international striker Zlatan Ibrahimović, who had been sold to Juventus. Charisteas made his Ajax debut on 23 January 2005 against FC Utrecht and scored his first goal four days later against SC Heerenveen. However, he only managed three more games all season. Charisteas netted home eight goals in the 2005–06 season, which included a late winner against Vitesse Arnhem. Charisteas missed Greece's crucial match in the World Cup qualifying due to a head injury received after colliding with Arsenal's Kolo Touré in a Champions League match which Ajax lost 2–1.

Under new Ajax manager Henk ten Cate, Charisteas was the 5th striker behind Klaas-Jan Huntelaar, Ryan Babel, Markus Rosenberg, and Rydell Poepon. Ten Cate explained this by saying that Charisteas is a great striker for the 4–4–2 formation, but not for the 4–3–3 formation, which is played for Ajax.

=== Feyenoord ===
Despite stating that he was only interested in a move to England or Germany, Charisteas signed for arch-rivals Feyenoord in Rotterdam on 31 August 2006, the final day of the summer transfer window. This move caused a great deal of agitation in Rotterdam with parts of The Legion, stating that they did not want an Ajax player at their club, protesting the move at De Kuip with the chant "Wij willen geen neus." (translated as: "we don't want a nose," nose being derogatory slang for Ajax players) and demanded that chairman Jorien van den Herik resign. Despite the protests, Charisteas made his debut for Feyenoord on 10 September against Sparta Rotterdam and played the full game. He eventually scored his first goal for his new club in his tenth game. Although he seemed to have convinced some fans at a certain point, Charisteas never enjoyed a good relationship with Feyenoord supporters. He finished the season having played a total of 28 games for Feyenoord, netting nine goals.

=== Nürnberg ===
On 6 July 2007, 1. FC Nürnberg confirmed a deal with Feyenoord to sign Charisteas on a four-year deal worth €2.5 million. He scored his first two official team goals in a 6–0 victory against fourth division club SC Victoria Hamburg.

At the beginning of the 2009–10 season, he returned to the newly promoted Nürnberg. His first goal of the season came on 12 March 2010, when he scored the winning goal in the 1–2 away win against Hertha BSC, helping Nürnberg to avoid the relegation, before Otto Rehhagel called him up to the Greece national team for the 2010 World Cup.

=== Bayer Leverkusen ===
On 2 February 2009, he was loaned out to Bayer Leverkusen until the end of the season, helping the team to reach the final of the German Cup.

=== Arles-Avignon ===
On 10 August 2010, Charisteas signed for Arles-Avignon, along with his national teammate Angelos Basinas. He made his debut on 21 August 2010 in a 1–2 away defeat against Toulouse. Charisteas made a total of seven appearances, scoring no goals, before his contract was terminated on 26 November 2010.

=== Schalke 04 ===
On 30 January 2011, Schalke 04 formalized his arrival. Charisteas signed a contract on 30 June 2011, until the end of the season. In his debut match for Schalke, he scored the second goal in a 2–1 home win against Eintracht Frankfurt. It was his first touch of the ball, having been on the pitch for only 52 seconds. On 13 April 2011, Charisteas reached the semi-finals of the 2010–11 UEFA Champions League with Schalke, beating in the quarter-finals the defending champion Inter Milan, Charisteas replaced the Brazilian Edu in the 32nd minute of the second half.

On 21 May 2011, Charisteas won the German Cup with Schalke 04.

=== Panetolikos ===
On 27 July 2011, Charisteas joined Panetolikos, newly promoted to the Super League, signing a one-year contract. His first goal of the season came on 14 September 2011 when he scored the winning goal in the 1–0 home win against Asteras Tripolis.

=== Al-Nassr ===
After interest from Inter Milan, reported in the newspaper Corriere dello Sport, on 17 February 2013, Charisteas signed a one-and-a-half-year contract with Al-Nassr FC. Charisteas played his debut in the final of the 2012–13 Saudi Crown Prince Cup against Al-Hilal FC on 22 February 2013. After 90 minutes penalties had to be taken and Charisteas missed the fourth.

== International career ==
After having been a regular player for the Greek U21 side, Charisteas made his international debut in February 2001 in a 3–3 draw against Russia. His impact was immediate as he scored two of the goals for Greece that day. His prolific goal scoring continued, eventually helping his team qualify for the Euro 2004.

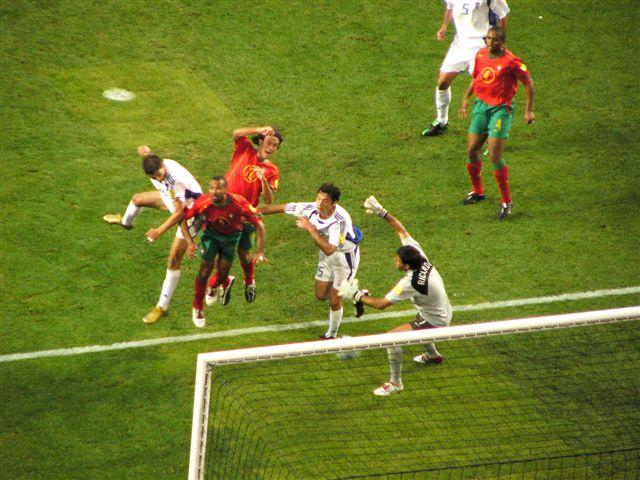
Charisteas scores for Greece in the UEFA Euro 2004 Final against Portugal on 4 July

During the victorious Euro 2004 campaign, Charisteas scored three goals: one in the group stage against Spain, one against France in the quarterfinals and the winning goal against the host country Portugal in the final on 4 July, securing himself a permanent place in the history of the sport. The win against Portugal was also considered as the greatest triumph of the nation.

His contribution to the team and his impact in the competition was further recognised when he was named in the Euro 2004 All-star Team and he was also nominated for the 2004 Ballon d'Or award, where he finished 11th in votes.

In January 2007, Charisteas told Dutch football magazine Voetbal International that winning Euro 2004 was an unbelievable experience which he would not swap for all the money in the world: "Even in 50 years time, everybody will remember that I scored the goal which made Greece the champions of Europe. We wrote history and my life changed completely at that point."

Charisteas scored three goals for Euro 2008 qualifying rounds, helping Greece to automatically qualify for the competition with two games left. He would go on to be one of the few Greece players who performed well at Euro 2008, scoring the defending champions' only goal of the tournament in the 2–1 defeat to Spain. He scored 4 goals for his country in the 2010 FIFA World Cup qualification.

Charisteas was included in the squad that travelled to South Africa for the final tournament, where he played one game. In that competition, he was the only Greece player to participate in two European Championships and a World Cup (others sharing this distinction: Giourkas Seitaridis, Kostas Katsouranis, Georgios Karagounis and the goalkeeper Kostas Chalkias).

Charisteas received another call-up on 8 October 2011 for the qualification match against Croatia. On 11 October 2011, he scored the winning goal in the 85th minute in Georgia, securing a 2–1 victory which sent Greece automatically to the UEFA Euro 2012. With this goal, Charisteas score in three qualifiers for European Championship and for three consecutive World Cups, became the only player to reach that distinction in the Greece national team.

Charisteas also became the second top scorer for the Greece national team with 25 goals, four fewer than the retired Nikos Anastopoulos.

== Style of play ==
Charisteas played primarily as a target man.

== Post-playing career ==
=== Sports Directing ===
On 29 August 2019, Charisteas became sporting director of his former club Aris Thessaloniki. He initially worked loosely as a player agent, and obtained a UEFA B license before registering to acquire further coaching certificates.

=== Politics ===
In 2019, Charisteas was elected to the Regional Parliament of Central Macedonia and he was re-elected in 2023. He has served as Deputy Regional Governor of Digital Policy of the Region of Central Macedonia and he is currently serving as Deputy Regional Governor for Volunteering and Youth Affairs of Central Macedonia.

== Personal life ==
During his time as a footballer, Charisteas was known to play the Bouzouki in his spare time.

== Career statistics ==
=== Club ===
Appearances and goals by club, season and competition
Club	Season	League			Cup		Continental		Total	
Club	Season	Division	Apps	Goals	Apps	Goals	Apps	Goals	Apps	Goals
Aris	1997–98	Beta Ethniki	9	2	2	0	0	0	11	2
Aris	1998–99	Alpha Ethniki	12	4	2	0	0	0	14	4
Aris	1999–2000	Alpha Ethniki	21	1	7	1	1	0	29	2
Aris	2000–01	Alpha Ethniki	28	8	9	2	0	0	37	10
Aris	2001–02	Alpha Ethniki	19	4	9	2	0	0	28	6
Aris	Total		89	19	29	5	1	0	119	24
Athinaikos	1998–99	Beta Ethniki	7	1	0	0	0	0	7	1
Werder Bremen	2002–03	Bundesliga	31	9	4	4	4	2	39	15
Werder Bremen	2003–04	Bundesliga	24	4	5	2	3	1	32	7
Werder Bremen	2004–05	Bundesliga	11	5	2	0	5	1	18	6
Werder Bremen	Total		66	18	11	6	12	4	89	28
Ajax	2004–05	Eredivisie	13	4	0	0	0	0	13	4
Ajax	2005–06	Eredivisie	17	8	3	1	4	0	24	9
Ajax	2006–07	Eredivisie	1	0	0	0	0	0	1	0
Ajax	Total		31	12	3	1	4	0	38	13
Feyenoord	2006–07	Eredivisie	28	9	3	1	5	1	36	11
1. FC Nürnberg	2007–08	Bundesliga	24	6	1	2	6	3	31	11
1. FC Nürnberg	2008–09	2. Bundesliga	14	1	2	0	0	0	16	1
1. FC Nürnberg	2009–10	Bundesliga	19	1	1	0	0	0	20	1
1. FC Nürnberg	Total		57	8	4	2	6	3	67	13
Bayer Leverkusen (loan)	2008–09	Bundesliga	13	1	3	1	0	0	16	2
Arles-Avignon	2010–11	Ligue 1	6	0	0	0	0	0	6	0
Schalke 04	2010–11	Bundesliga	4	1	1	0	1	0	6	1
Panetolikos	2011–12	Super League Greece	24	4	2	0	0	0	26	4
Al-Nassr	2012–13	Saudi Premier League	7	1	2	0	0	0	9	1
Career total			330	74	38	15	29	8	397	97

=== International ===
Appearances and goals by national team and year
National team	Year	Apps	Goals
Greece	2001	7	4
Greece	2002	6	0
Greece	2003	10	3
Greece	2004	15	6
Greece	2005	10	1
Greece	2006	7	1
Greece	2007	6	2
Greece	2008	12	6
Greece	2009	8	0
Greece	2010	4	1
Greece	2011	3	1
Total		88	25

Scores and results list Greece's goal tally first, score column indicates score after each Charisteas goal.

List of international goals scored by Angelos Charisteas
No.	Date	Venue	Opponent	Score	Result	Competition
1	28 February 2001	Theodoros Vardinogiannis Stadium, Heraklion, Greece	Russia	2–3	3–3	Friendly
2	28 February 2001	Theodoros Vardinogiannis Stadium, Heraklion, Greece	Russia	3–3	3–3	Friendly
3	28 March 2001	Olympic Stadium, Athens, Greece	Germany	1–1	2–4	2002 FIFA World Cup qualifier
4	6 October 2001	Old Trafford, Manchester, England	England	1–0	2–2	2002 FIFA World Cup qualifier
5	2 April 2003	Windsor Park, Belfast, Northern Ireland	Northern Ireland	1–0	2–0	UEFA Euro 2004 qualifier
6	2 April 2003	Windsor Park, Belfast, Northern Ireland	Northern Ireland	2–0	2–0	UEFA Euro 2004 qualifier
7	11 June 2003	Leoforos Alexandras Stadium, Athens, Greece	Ukraine	1–0	1–0	UEFA Euro 2004 qualifier
8	3 June 2004	Rheinpark Stadion, Vaduz, Liechtenstein	Liechtenstein	2–0	2–0	Friendly
9	16 June 2004	Estádio do Bessa, Porto, Portugal	Spain	1–1	1–1	UEFA Euro 2004
10	25 June 2004	Estádio José Alvalade, Lisbon, Portugal	France	1–0	1–0	UEFA Euro 2004
11	4 July 2004	Estádio da Luz, Lisbon, Portugal	Portugal	1–0	1–0	UEFA Euro 2004
12	17 November 2004	Karaiskákis Stadium, Piraeus, Greece	Kazakhstan	1–0	3–1	2006 FIFA World Cup qualifier
13	17 November 2004	Karaiskákis Stadium, Piraeus, Greece	Kazakhstan	2–0	3–1	2006 FIFA World Cup qualifier
14	30 March 2005	Karaiskákis Stadium, Piraeus, Greece	Albania	1–0	2–0	2006 FIFA World Cup qualifier
15	11 October 2006	Bilino Polje, Zenica, Bosnia and Herzegovina	Bosnia and Herzegovina	1–0	4–0	UEFA Euro 2008 qualifier
16	6 June 2007	Pankritio Stadium, Heraklion, Greece	Moldova	1–0	2–1	UEFA Euro 2008 qualifier
17	13 October 2007	Olympic Stadium, Athens, Greece	Bosnia and Herzegovina	1–0	3–2	UEFA Euro 2008 qualifier
18	6 February 2008	GSP Stadium, Nicosia, Cyprus	Finland	1–1	2–1	Friendly
19	18 June 2008	Wals Siezenheim Stadium, Salzburg, Austria	Spain	1–0	1–2	UEFA Euro 2008
20	6 September 2008	Stade Josy Barthel, Luxembourg, Luxembourg	Luxembourg	3–0	3–0	2010 FIFA World Cup qualifier
21	11 October 2008	Karaiskákis Stadium, Piraeus, Greece	Moldova	1–0	3–0	2010 FIFA World Cup qualifier
22	11 October 2008	Karaiskákis Stadium, Piraeus, Greece	Moldova	3–0	3–0	2010 FIFA World Cup qualifier
23	15 October 2008	Karaiskákis Stadium, Piraeus, Greece	Switzerland	1–1	1–2	2010 FIFA World Cup qualifier
24	25 May 2010	Stadion Schnabelholz, Altach, Austria	North Korea	2–1	2–2	Friendly
25	11 October 2011	Mikheil Meskhi Stadium, Tbilisi, Georgia	Georgia	2–1	2–1	UEFA Euro 2012 qualifier

== Honours ==
Werder Bremen

- Bundesliga: 2003–04
- DFB-Pokal: 2003–04

Ajax

- Dutch Cup: 2005–06
- Dutch Super Cup: 2005–06

Bayer Leverkusen

- DFB-Pokal runners-up: 2008–09

Schalke 04

- DFB-Pokal: 2010–11

Al-Nassr

- Crown Prince Cup runners-up: 2012–13

Greece

- European Championship: 2004

Individual

- UEFA Euro 2004: UEFA Team of the Tournament
