= Sweden men's national football team results (2000–2009) =

- Win Draw Loss

This is a list of Sweden men's national football team results (2000 to 2009).

=== 2000 ===
31 January 2000–2001 Nordic Championship	Sweden	1–0	Denmark	La Manga, Spain
12:30 UTC+1	Allbäck 22'	Report		Stadium: La Manga Stadium; Attendance: 500; Referee: Rune Pedersen (Norway)

4 February 2000–2001 Nordic Championship	Norway	1–1	Sweden	La Manga, Spain
12:30 UTC+1	Carew 84'	Report	Andersson 87' (pen.)	Stadium: La Manga Stadium; Attendance: 600; Referee: Mikko Vuorela (Finland)

23 February International Friendly	Italy	1–0	Sweden	Palermo, Italy
20:30 UTC+1	Del Piero 78' (pen.)	Report		Stadium: Stadio La Favorita; Attendance: 17,249; Referee: Luc Huyghe (Belgium)

29 March International Friendly	Austria	1–1	Sweden	Graz, Austria
19:30 UTC+2	Flögel 17'	Report	Pettersson 86'	Stadium: Arnold Schwarzenegger Stadion; Attendance: 9,120; Referee: Alain Hamer (Luxembourg)

26 April International Friendly	Denmark	0–1	Sweden	Copenhagen, Denmark
19:15 UTC+2		Report	Pettersson 37'	Stadium: Parken Stadium; Attendance: 28,491; Referee: Alain Hamer (Luxembourg)

3 June International Friendly	Sweden	1–1	Spain	Solna, Sweden
20:00 UTC+2	Nilsson 76' (pen.)	Report	Guardiola 43' (pen.)	Stadium: Råsunda Stadium; Attendance: 35,215; Referee: Fiorenzo Treossi (Italy)

10 June UEFA Euro 2000 Group B	Belgium	2–1	Sweden	Brussels, Belgium
20:45 UTC+2	Goor 43'; Mpenza 46'	Report	Mjällby 53'	Stadium: Stade Roi Baudouin; Attendance: 46,700; Referee: Markus Merk (Germany)

15 June UEFA Euro 2000 Group B	Sweden	0–0	Turkey	Eindhoven, Netherlands
20:45 UTC+2		Report		Stadium: Philips Stadion; Attendance: 27,000; Referee: Dick Jol (Netherlands)

19 June UEFA Euro 2000 Group B	Italy	2–1	Sweden	Eindhoven, Netherlands
20:45 UTC+2	Di Biagio 39'; Del Piero 88'	Report	Larsson 77'	Stadium: Philips Stadion; Attendance: 30,000; Referee: Vítor Melo Pereira (Portugal)

16 August 2000–2001 Nordic Championship	Iceland	2–1	Sweden	Reykjavík, Iceland
18:45 UTC+0	Daðason 19'; Sigurðsson 84' (pen.)	Report	Mjällby 23'	Stadium: Laugardalsvöllur; Attendance: 5,116; Referee: Kenny Clark (Scotland)

2 September 2002 FIFA World Cup qualification	Azerbaijan	0–1	Sweden	Baku, Azerbaijan
20:45 UTC+2		Report	Svensson 10'	Stadium: Tofik Bakhramov Stadium; Attendance: 20,000; Referee: Roelof Luinge (Netherlands)

7 October 2002 FIFA World Cup qualification	Sweden	1–1	Turkey	Gothenburg, Sweden
16:00 UTC+2	Larsson 69'	Report	Havutçu 90'	Stadium: Ullevi; Attendance: 42,152; Referee: Hellmut Krug (Germany)

11 October 2002 FIFA World Cup qualification	Slovakia	0–0	Sweden	Bratislava, Slovakia
20:15 UTC+2		Report		Stadium: Tehelné pole Attendance: 11,227; Referee: Hugh Dallas (Scotland)

=== 2001 ===
31 January 2000–2001 Nordic Championship	Sweden	0–0	Faroe Islands	Växjö, Sweden
18:00 UTC+1		Report		Stadium: Tipshallen; Attendance: 2,204; Referee: Terje Hauge (Norway)

1 February 2000–2001 Nordic Championship	Sweden	0–1	Finland	Jönköping, Sweden
19:00 UTC+1		Report	Marjamaa 38'	Stadium: Tipshallen; Attendance: 2,196; Referee: Roy Helge Olsen (Norway)

10 February 2001 King's Cup Group Stage	Thailand	1–4	Sweden	Bangkok, Thailand
18:30 UTC+7	Totchtawan 49'	Report	Selaković 25' (pen.); Svensson 39'; Berglund 72'; Åslund 90'	Stadium: Suphachalasai Stadium; Attendance: 20,000; Referee: Ahmad Khalidi Supian (Malaysia)

12 February 2001 King's Cup Group Stage	China	2–2	Sweden	Bangkok, Thailand
16:00 UTC+7	Zhang 14', 67'	Report	Svensson 68'; Åslund 79'	Stadium: Suphachalasai Stadium; Attendance: 1,000; Referee: Satop Tongkhan (Thailand)

14 February 2001 King's Cup Group Stage	Qatar	0–0	Sweden	Bangkok, Thailand
16:00 UTC+7		Report		Stadium: Suphachalasai Stadium; Attendance: 500; Referee: Ahmad Khalidi Supian (Malaysia)

17 February 2001 King's Cup Final	Sweden	3–0	China	Bangkok, Thailand
18:30 UTC+7	Jonson 5'; Linderoth 12'; Selaković 19'	Report		Stadium: Suphachalasai Stadium; Attendance: 10,000; Referee: Mongkol Rungklay (Thailand)

28 February International Friendly	Malta	0–3	Sweden	Ta' Qali, Malta
15:00 UTC+1		Report	Corneliusson 31'; Larsson 41'; Mild 78'	Stadium: Ta'Qali Stadium; Attendance: 1,200; Referee: Cosimo Bolognino (Italy)

24 March 2002 FIFA World Cup qualification	Sweden	1–0	Macedonia	Gothenburg, Sweden
16:00 UTC+1	Svensson 43'	Report		Stadium: Ullevi; Attendance: 22,106; Referee: Jan Wegereef (Netherlands)

28 March 2002 FIFA World Cup qualification	Moldova	0–2	Sweden	Chișinău, Moldova
21:00 UTC+3		Report	Allbäck 86', 89'	Stadium: Stadionul Republican; Attendance: 7,000; Referee: Laurent Duhamel (France)

25 April International Friendly	Switzerland	0–2	Sweden	Geneva, Switzerland
18:15 UTC+2		Report	Svensson 61', 79'	Stadium: Stade des Charmilles; Attendance: 6,062; Referee: Bruno Derrien (France)

2 June 2002 FIFA World Cup qualification	Sweden	2–0	Slovakia	Solna, Sweden
18:00 UTC+2	Allbäck 45', 52'	Report		Stadium: Råsunda Stadium; Attendance: 34,327; Referee: José María García-Aranda (Spain)

6 June 2002 FIFA World Cup qualification	Sweden	6–0	Moldova	Gothenburg, Sweden
20:15 UTC+2	Larsson 37' (pen.), 57', 68' (pen.), 80'; Alexandersson 74'; Allbäck 77'	Report		Stadium: Ullevi; Attendance: 30,233; Referee: Steve Dunn (England)

15 August International Friendly	Sweden	3–0	South Africa	Solna, Sweden
19:00 UTC+2	Larsson 5' (pen.); Allbäck 56'; Andersson 85'	Report		Stadium: Råsunda Stadium; Attendance: 28,766; Referee: Mike Riley (England)

1 September 2002 FIFA World Cup qualification	Macedonia	1–2	Sweden	Skopje, Macedonia
20:00 UTC+2	Načevski 63'	Report	Larsson 28'; Andersson 33'	Stadium: Gradski Stadium; Attendance: 8,000; Referee: Nikolai Levnikov (Russia)

5 September 2002 FIFA World Cup qualification	Turkey	1–2	Sweden	Istanbul, Turkey
20:30 UTC+3	Şükür 51'	Report	Larsson 88'; Andersson 90+2'	Stadium: Ali Sami Yen Stadium; Attendance: 25,000; Referee: Stefano Braschi (Italy)

7 October 2002 FIFA World Cup qualification	Sweden	3–0	Azerbaijan	Solna, Sweden
16:00 UTC+2	Svensson 53'; Larsson 61' (pen.); Ibrahimović 70'	Report		Stadium: Råsunda Stadium; Attendance: 32,786; Referee: Ruszard Wójcik (Poland)

10 November International Friendly	England	1–1	Sweden	Manchester, England
15:00 UTC+0	Beckham 28' (pen.)	Report	Mild 44'	Stadium: Old Trafford; Attendance: 64,413; Referee: Claude Colombo (France)

=== 2002 ===
13 February International Friendly	Greece	2–2	Sweden	Thessaloniki, Greece
19:00 UTC+2	Fyssas 54'; Karagounis 85'	Report	Svensson 31'; Selaković 64'	Stadium: Kleanthis Vikelides Stadium; Attendance: 14,054; Referee: Attila Ábrahám (Hungary)

27 March International Friendly	Sweden	1–1	Switzerland	Malmö, Sweden
19:00 UTC+2	Allbäck 29'	Report	Cabanas 54'	Stadium: Malmö Stadion; Attendance: 19,096; Referee: Valentin Ivanov (Russia)

17 April International Friendly	Norway	0–0	Sweden	Oslo, Norway
20:00 UTC+2		Report		Stadium: Ullevaal Stadion; Attendance: 20,759; Referee: Knud Erik Fisker (Denmark)

17 May International Friendly	Sweden	1–2	Paraguay	Solna, Sweden
19:00 UTC+2	Andersson 54'	Report	Santa Cruz 17'; Paredes 44'	Stadium: Råsunda Stadium; Attendance: 33,103; Referee: Manuel Enrique Mejuto Gonzales (Spain)

27 May International Friendly	Japan	1–1	Sweden	Yokohama, Japan
19:20 UTC+9	Mjällby 63' (o.g.)	Report	Allbäck 20'	Stadium: International Stadium Yokohama; Attendance: 55,418; Referee: Zhou Weixin (China)

2 June 2002 FIFA World Cup Group F	England	1–1	Sweden	Saitama, Japan
18:30 UTC+9	Campbell 24'	Report	Alexandersson 59'	Stadium: Saitama Stadium; Attendance: 52,721; Referee: Carlos Eugênio Simon (Brazil)

7 June 2002 FIFA World Cup Group F	Sweden	2–1	Nigeria	Kobe, Japan
15:30 UTC+9	Larsson 35', 62' (pen.)	Report	Aghahowa 27'	Stadium: Kobe Wing Stadium; Attendance: 36,194; Referee: René Ortube (Bolivia)

12 June 2002 FIFA World Cup Group F	Sweden	1–1	Argentina	Rifu, Japan
15:30 UTC+9	Svensson 59'	Report	Crespo 88'	Stadium: Miyagi Stadium; Attendance: 45,777; Referee: Ali Bujsaim (UAE)

16 June 2002 FIFA World Cup Round of 16	Sweden	1–2 (a.e.t.)	Senegal	Ōita, Japan
15:30 UTC+9	Larsson 11'	Report	Camara 37' 104'	Stadium: Ōita Stadium; Attendance: 39,747; Referee: Ubaldo Aquino (Paraguay)

21 August International Friendly	Russia	1–1	Sweden	Moscow, Russia
19:00 UTC+4	Kerzhakov 55'	Report	Ibrahimović 90+4'	Stadium: Lokomotiv Stadium; Attendance: 19,864; Referee: Eric Poulat (France)

7 September UEFA Euro 2004 qualifying	Latvia	0–0	Sweden	Riga, Latvia
20:00 UTC+3		Report		Stadium: Skonto Stadions; Attendance: 7,950; Referee: Frank De Bleeckere (Belgium)

12 October UEFA Euro 2004 qualifying	Sweden	1–1	Hungary	Solna, Sweden
16:00 UTC+2	Ibrahimović 76'	Report	Kenesei 5'	Stadium: Råsunda Stadium; Attendance: 35,084; Referee: Wolfgang Stark (Germany)

16 October International Friendly	Sweden	2–3	Portugal	Gothenburg, Sweden
20:00 UTC+2	Pettersson 6'; Allbäck 24'	Report	Conceição 35' (pen.); Romeu 54'; Rui Costa 88'	Stadium: Ullevi; Attendance: 30,047; Referee: Kyros Vassaras (Greece)

20 November International Friendly	Czech Republic	3–3	Sweden	Teplice, Czech Republic
20:10 UTC+1	Fukal 8'; Vachoušek 45'; Baroš 63'	Report	Nilsson 29', 43'; Allbäck 65'	Stadium: Na Stínadlech; Attendance: 10,238; Referee: Muhittin Borsat (Turkey)

=== 2003 ===
12 February International Friendly	Tunisia	1–0	Sweden	Radès, Tunisia
18:00 UTC+1	Braham 49'	Report		Stadium: Stade 7 Novembre; Attendance: 18,443; Referee: Jamel Haimoudi (Algeria)

16 February 2003 King's Cup Group Stage	Sweden	3–2	Qatar	Bangkok, Thailand
18:30 UTC+7	Elmander 16', 24'; Skoog 82'	Report	Yasser 24'; Al-Enazi 90' (pen.)	Stadium: Suphachalasai Stadium; Attendance: 3,828; Referee: Panya Hanlumyaung (Thailand)

18 February 2003 King's Cup Group Stage	North Korea	1–1	Sweden	Bangkok, Thailand
18:30 UTC+7	Pak Yong Chol 16'	Report	Skoog 20'	Stadium: Suphachalasai Stadium; Attendance: 1,573; Referee: Mongkol Rungklay (Thailand)

20 February 2003 King's Cup Group Stage	Thailand	1–4	Sweden	Bangkok, Thailand
17:30 UTC+7	Vachiraban 80'	Report	Thanongsak 47' (o.g.); Elmander 63'; Farnerud 66'; Majstorović 69'	Stadium: Suphachalasai Stadium; Attendance: 4,089; Referee: Lee Gi Young (South Korea)

22 February 2003 King's Cup Final	Sweden	4–0	North Korea	Bangkok, Thailand
17:30 UTC+7	Skoog 3', 77'; Grahn 26'; Johannesson 56'	Report		Stadium: Suphachalasai Stadium; Attendance: 8,865; Referee: Chaiwat Kunsuta (Thailand)

2 April UEFA Euro 2004 qualifying	Hungary	1–2	Sweden	Budapest, Hungary
20:15 UTC+2	Lisztes 65'	Report	Allbäck 34', 67'	Stadium: Ferenc Puskás Stadium; Attendance: 28,000; Referee: Lucílio Batista (Portugal)

30 April International Friendly	Sweden	1–2	Croatia	Solna, Sweden
16:00 UTC+2	Ibrahimović 33'	Report	Olić 6'; Živković 58'	Stadium: Råsunda Stadium; Attendance: 15,109; Referee: Dick van Egmond (Netherlands)

7 June UEFA Euro 2004 qualifying	San Marino	0–6	Sweden	Serravalle, San Marino
20:00 UTC+2		Report	Jonson 16', 60', 71'; Allbäck 52', 86'; Ljungberg 55'	Stadium: Stadio Olimpico; Attendance: 2,184; Referee: Dejan Delević (Serbia and Montenegro)

11 June UEFA Euro 2004 qualifying	Sweden	3–0	Poland	Solna, Sweden
20:00 UTC+2	Svensson 15', 71'; Allbäck 43'	Report		Stadium: Råsunda Stadium; Attendance: 35,220; Referee: Gilles Veissière (France)

20 August International Friendly	Sweden	1–2	Greece	Norrköping, Sweden
20:15 UTC+2	Svensson 16'	Report	Giannakopoulos 63'; Kafes 65'	Stadium: Idrottsparken; Attendance: 12,035; Referee: Jouni Hyytiä (Finland)

6 September UEFA Euro 2004 qualifying	Sweden	5–0	San Marino	Gothenburg, Sweden
16:00 UTC+2	Jonson 33'; Jakobsson 49'; Ibrahimović 56', 83' (pen.); Källström 68' (pen.)	Report		Stadium: Ullevi; Attendance: 31,098; Referee: Stefan Meßner (Austria)

10 September UEFA Euro 2004 qualifying	Poland	0–2	Sweden	Chorzów, Poland
20:15 UTC+2		Report	Nilsson 3'; Mellberg 38'	Stadium: Stadion Śląski; Attendance: 34,337; Referee: Mike Riley (England)

11 October UEFA Euro 2004 qualifying	Sweden	0–1	Latvia	Solna, Sweden
17:00 UTC+2		Report	Verpakovskis 22'	Stadium: Råsunda Stadium; Attendance: 32,095; Referee: Massimo De Santis (Italy)

18 November International Friendly	Egypt	1–0	Sweden	Cairo, Egypt
20:45 UTC+2	Belal 10'	Report		Stadium: Cairo International Stadium; Attendance: 16,509; Referee: Mohamed Abdalla (Libya)

=== 2004 ===
22 January 2004 Carlsberg Cup Semi-final	Norway	3–0	Sweden	So Kon Po, Hong Kong
15:00 UTC+8	Johnsen 45', 54'; Flo 62'	Report		Stadium: Hong Kong Stadium; Attendance: 8,965; Referee: Jame Fong Yau Fat (Hong Kong)

25 January 2004 Carlsberg Cup Third place match	Hong Kong League XI	0–3	Sweden	So Kon Po, Hong Kong
15:00 UTC+8			Stefanidis 8'; Nilsson 74', 90'	Stadium: Hong Kong Stadium; Attendance: 14,604; Referee: Adunyachart Khanthama (Thailand)

18 February International Friendly	Albania	2–1	Sweden	Tirana, Albania
19:45 UTC+1	Skela 67'; Aliaj 75'	Report	Selaković 50'	Stadium: Qemal Stafa; Attendance: 15,000; Referee: Gianluca Paparesta (Italy)

31 March International Friendly	Sweden	1–0	England	Gothenburg, Sweden
20:45 UTC+2	Ibrahimović 54'	Report		Stadium: Ullevi; Attendance: 40,464; Referee: Tom Øvrebø (Norway)

28 April International Friendly	Portugal	2–2	Sweden	Coimbra, Portugal
21:15 UTC+1	Pauleta 33'; Nuno Gomes 90+1'	Report	Källström 17'; Rui Jorge 86' (o.g.)	Stadium: Estádio Municipal de Coimbra; Attendance: 15,443; Referee: Darko Čeferin (Slovenia)

28 May International Friendly	Finland	1–3	Sweden	Tampere, Finland
20:00 UTC+3	Litmanen 6'	Report	Andersson 30'; Allbäck 45', 82'	Stadium: Ratinan Stadion; Attendance: 16,102; Referee: Alberto Undiano Mallenco (Spain)

5 June International Friendly	Sweden	3–1	Poland	Solna, Sweden
18:30 UTC+2	Larsson 42'; Jakobsson 54'; Allbäck 72'	Report	Gorawski 89'	Stadium: Råsunda Stadium; Attendance: 28,281; Referee: Alan Kelly (Ireland)

14 June UEFA Euro 2004 Group C	Sweden	5–0	Bulgaria	Lisbon, Portugal
19:45 UTC+1	Ljungberg 32'; Larsson 57', 58'; Ibrahimović 78' (pen.); Allbäck 90+1'	Report		Stadium: Estádio José Alvalade; Attendance: 31,652; Referee: Mike Riley (England)

18 June UEFA Euro 2004 Group C	Italy	1–1	Sweden	Porto, Portugal
19:45 UTC+1	Cassano 37'	Report	Ibrahimović 85'	Stadium: Estádio do Dragão; Attendance: 44,926; Referee: Urs Meier (Switzerland)

22 June UEFA Euro 2004 Group C	Denmark	2–2	Sweden	Porto, Portugal
19:45 UTC+1	Dahl Tomasson 28', 66'	Report	Larsson 47' (pen.); Jonson 89'	Stadium: Estádio do Bessa Século XXI; Attendance: 26,115; Referee: Markus Merk (Germany)

26 June UEFA Euro 2004 Quarter-final	Sweden	0–0 (a.e.t.) (4–5 p)	Netherlands	Faro/Loulé, Portugal
19:45 UTC+1		Report		Stadium: Estádio do Algarve; Attendance: 27,762; Referee: Ľuboš Micheľ (Slovakia)
	Penalties
	Källström (penalty scored); Larsson (penalty scored); Ibrahimović (penalty missed); Ljungberg (penalty scored); Wilhelmsson (penalty scored); Mellberg (penalty missed)		(penalty scored) Van Nistelrooy; (penalty scored) Heitinga; (penalty scored) Reiziger; (penalty missed) Cocu; (penalty scored) Makaay; (penalty scored) Robben

18 August International Friendly	Sweden	2–2	Netherlands	Solna, Sweden
20:15 UTC+2	Jonson 4'; Ibrahimović 69'	Report	Sneijder 17'; Van Bommel 43'	Stadium: Råsunda Stadium; Attendance: 20,377; Referee: Rob Styles (England)

4 September 2006 FIFA World Cup qualification	Malta	0–7	Sweden	Ta'Qali, Malta
20:45 UTC+2		Report	Ibrahimović 4', 11', 14', 71'; Ljungberg 46', 74'; Larsson 76'	Stadium: Ta' Qali Stadium; Attendance: 4,200; Referee: Haim Yaacov (Israel)

8 September 2006 FIFA World Cup qualification	Sweden	0–1	Croatia	Gothenburg, Sweden
20:15 UTC+2		Report	Srna 63'	Stadium: Ullevi; Attendance: 40,023; Referee: Arturo Daudén Ibáñez (Spain)

9 October 2006 FIFA World Cup qualification	Sweden	3 –0	Hungary	Solna, Sweden
17:00 UTC+2	Ljungberg 26'; Larsson 50'; Svensson 67'	Report		Stadium: Råsunda Stadium; Attendance: 32,288; Referee: Stuart Dougal (Scotland)

13 October 2006 FIFA World Cup qualification	Iceland	1–4	Sweden	Reykjavík, Iceland
18:10 UTC+0	Guðjohnsen 66'	Report	Larsson 23', 38'; Allbäck 25'; Wilhelmsson 44'	Stadium: Laugardalsvöllur; Attendance: 7,037; Referee: Massimo Busacca (Switzerland)

17 November International Friendly	Scotland	1–4	Sweden	Edinburgh, Scotland
19:00 UTC+0	McFadden 78' (pen.)	Report	Allbäck 26', 50'; Elmander 73'; Berglund 74'	Stadium: Easter Road; Attendance: 15,071; Referee: Jaroslav Jara (Czech Republic)

=== 2005 ===
22 January International Friendly	South Korea	1–1	Sweden	Carson, United States
20:00 UTC-8	Chung Kyung-ho 70'	Report	Rosenberg 86'	Stadium: The Home Depot Center; Attendance: 9,941; Referee: Ken Stott (United States)

26 January International Friendly	Mexico	0–0	Sweden	San Diego, United States
20:00 UTC-8		Report		Stadium: Petco Park; Attendance: 35,521; Referee: Brian Hall (United States)

9 February International Friendly	France	1–1	Sweden	Saint-Denis, France
21:00 UTC+1	Trezeguet 35'	Report	Ljungberg 11'	Stadium: Stade de France; Attendance: 58,923; Referee: Julián Rodríguez Santiago (Spain)

26 March 2006 FIFA World Cup qualification	Bulgaria	0–3	Sweden	Sofia, Bulgaria
17:30 UTC+2		Report	Ljungberg 17', 90+3' (pen.); Edman 73'	Stadium: Vasil Levski National Stadium; Attendance: 42,563; Referee: Herbert Fandel (Germany)

4 June 2006 FIFA World Cup qualification	Sweden	6–0	Malta	Gothenburg, Sweden
17:15 UTC+2	Jonson 6'; Svensson 18'; Wilhelmsson 29'; Ibrahimović 40'; Ljungerg 57'; Elmander 81'	Report		Stadium: Ullevi; Attendance: 35,593; Referee: Valentin Ivanov (Russia)

8 June International Friendly	Sweden	2–3	Norway	Solna, Sweden
20:15 UTC+2	Källström 16'; Elmander 68'	Report	Riise 60'; Helstad 64'; Iversen 65'	Stadium: Råsunda Stadium; Attendance: 15,345; Referee: Jaroslav Jara (Czech Republic)

17 August International Friendly	Sweden	2–1	Czech Republic	Gothenburg, Sweden
20:15 UTC+2	Larsson 19'; Rosenberg 26'	Report	Koller 22' (pen.)	Stadium: Ullevi; Attendance: 23,117; Referee: Steve Bennett (England)

3 September 2006 FIFA World Cup qualification	Sweden	3–0	Bulgaria	Solna, Sweden
17:15 UTC+2	Ljungberg 60'; Mellberg 75'; Ibrahimović 90+2'	Report		Stadium: Råsunda Stadium; Attendance: 33,883; Referee: Frank De Bleeckere (Belgium)

7 September 2006 FIFA World Cup qualification	Hungary	0–1	Sweden	Budapest, Hungary
20:45 UTC+2		Report	Ibrahimović 90+1'	Stadium: Ferenc Puskás Stadium; Attendance: 20,161; Referee: Stefano Farina (Italy)

8 October 2006 FIFA World Cup qualification	Croatia	1–0	Sweden	Zagreb, Croatia
20:15 UTC+2	Srna 56' (pen.)	Report		Stadium: Stadion Maksimir; Attendance: 34,015; Referee: Massimo De Santis (Italy)

12 October 2006 FIFA World Cup qualification	Sweden	3–1	Iceland	Solna, Sweden
19:30 UTC+2	Ibrahimović 29'; Larsson 42'; Källström 90+1'	Report	Árnason 25'	Stadium: Råsunda Stadium; Attendance: 33,716; Referee: Valentin Ivanov (Russia)

12 November International Friendly	South Korea	2–2	Sweden	Seoul, South Korea
20:00 UTC+9	Ahn Jung-hwan 8'; Kim Young-chul 52'	Report	Elmander 9'; Rosenberg 57'	Stadium: Seoul World Cup Stadium; Attendance: 59,113; Referee: Wan Daxue (China)

=== 2006 ===
18 January International Friendly	Saudi Arabia	1–1	Sweden	Riyadh, Saudi Arabia
20:10 UTC+3	Ameen 70'	Report	Svensson 32'	Stadium: Prince Faisal bin Fahd Stadium; Attendance: 3,000; Referee: Abdul Rahman Al Amri (Saudi Arabia)

23 January International Friendly	Jordan	0–0	Sweden	Abu Dhabi, United Arab Emirates
21:00 UTC+4		Report		Stadium: Al-Nahyan Stadium; Attendance: 1,000; Referee: Ali Al Mulla (United Arab Emirates)

1 March International Friendly	Republic of Ireland	3–0	Sweden	Dublin, Ireland
18:30 UTC+0	Duff 36'; Keane 48'; Miller 71'	Report		Stadium: Lansdowne Road; Attendance: 44,109; Referee: Damien Ledentu (France)

25 May International Friendly	Sweden	0–0	Finland	Gothenburg, Sweden
15:00 UTC+2		Report		Stadium: Ullevi; Attendance: 25,754; Referee: Grzegorz Gilewski (Poland)

2 June International Friendly	Sweden	1–1	Chile	Solna, Sweden
20:00 UTC+2	Larsson 32'	Report	Suazo 51'	Stadium: Råsunda Stadium; Attendance: 34,735; Referee: Wolfgang Stark (Germany)

10 June 2006 FIFA World Cup Group B	Trinidad and Tobago	0–0	Sweden	Dortmund, Germany
18:00 UTC+2		Report		Stadium: Westfalenstadion; Attendance: 62,959; Referee: Shamsul Maidin (Singapore)

15 June 2006 FIFA World Cup Group B	Sweden	1–0	Paraguay	Berlin, Germany
21:00 UTC+2	Ljungberg 89'	Report		Stadium: Olympiastadion; Attendance: 72,000; Referee: Ľuboš Micheľ (Slovakia)

20 June 2006 FIFA World Cup Group B	Sweden	2–2	England	Cologne, Germany
21:00 UTC+2	Allbäck 51'; Larsson 90'	Report	J. Cole 34'; Gerrard 85'	Stadium: RheinEnergieStadion; Attendance: 45,000; Referee: Massimo Busacca (Switzerland)

24 June 2006 FIFA World Cup Round of 16	Germany	2–0	Sweden	Munich, Germany
17:00 UTC+2	Podolski 4', 12'	Report		Stadium: Allianz Arena; Attendance: 66,000; Referee: Carlos Eugênio Simon (Brazil)

16 August International Friendly	Germany	3–0	Sweden	Gelsenkirchen, Germany
20:45 UTC+2	Schneider 4'; Klose 8', 44'	Report		Stadium: Veltins-Arena; Attendance: 53,000; Referee: Stefano Farina (Italy)

2 September UEFA Euro 2008 qualifying	Latvia	0–1	Sweden	Riga, Latvia
20:00 UTC+3		Report	Källström 37'	Stadium: Skonto Stadium; Attendance: 7,500; Referee: Darko Ceferin (Slovenia)

6 September UEFA Euro 2008 qualifying	Sweden	3–1	Liechtenstein	Gothenburg, Sweden
19:30 UTC+2	Allbäck 1', 70'; Rosenberg 89'	Report	Frick 27'	Stadium: Ullevi; Attendance: 17,735; Referee: Viaceslav Banari (Moldova)

7 October UEFA Euro 2008 qualifying	Sweden	2–0	Spain	Solna, Sweden
20:00 UTC+2	Elmander 10'; Allbäck 82'	Report		Stadium: Råsunda Stadium; Attendance: 33,056; Referee: Stephen Bennett (England)

11 October UEFA Euro 2008 qualifying	Iceland	1–2	Sweden	Reykjavík, Iceland
18:05 UTC+0	Viðarsson 6'	Report	Källström 8'; Wilhelmsson 59'	Stadium: Laugardalsvöllur; Attendance: 8,725; Referee: Grzegorz Gilewski (Poland)

15 November International Friendly	Sweden	0–1	Ivory Coast	Le Mans, France
18:15 UTC+1		Report	Drogba 37'	Stadium: Stade Omnisports Léon Bollée; Attendance: 3,8444; Referee: Fredy Fautrel (France)

=== 2007 ===
14 January International Friendly	Venezuela	2–0	Sweden	Maracaibo, Venezuela
17:00 UTC-4	Guerra 17'; Arismendi 90+1'	Report		Stadium: Estadio José Pachencho; Attendance: 14,000; Referee: Hernando Buitrago (Colombia)

19 January International Friendly	Ecuador	2–1	Sweden	Cuenca, Ecuador
14:45 UTC-5	Vaca 16'; Tenorio 25'	Report	Prica 90+1'	Stadium: Estadio Alejandro Serrano; Attendance: 18,000; Referee: Victor Carillo (Paraguay)

21 January International Friendly	Ecuador	1–1	Sweden	Quito, Ecuador
15:05 UTC-5	Zura 82'	Report	Nannskog 69'	Stadium: Estadio Olímpico Atahualpa; Attendance: 25,000; Referee: Manuel Garay (Paraguay)

7 February International Friendly	Egypt	2–0	Sweden	Cairo, Egypt
20:00 UTC+2	Zaki 43'; Fathi 88'	Report		Stadium: Cairo International Stadium; Attendance: 40,000; Referee: Mohamed Abdalla (Libya)

28 March UEFA Euro 2008 qualifying	Northern Ireland	2–1	Sweden	Belfast, Northern Ireland
19:45 UTC+1	Healy 31', 58'	Report	Elmander 26'	Stadium: Windsor Park; Attendance: 13,500; Referee: Eric Braamhaar (Netherlands)

2 June UEFA Euro 2008 qualifying	Denmark	0–3; Awarded (Note: The Denmark v Sweden match was abandoned in the 89th minute with the score at 3–3, following a fan attack on the referee. UEFA awarded the match as a 3–0 forfeit win to Sweden following a hearing on 8 June 2007 but maintains the original goals and the yellow and red cards.)	Sweden	Copenhagen, Denmark
20:00 UTC+2	Agger 34'; Dahl Tomasson 62'; Andreasen 75'	Report	Elmander 7', 26'; Hansson 23'	Stadium: Parken Stadium; Attendance: 42,083; Referee: Herbert Fandel (Germany)

6 June UEFA Euro 2008 qualifying	Sweden	5–0	Iceland	Solna, Sweden
20:15 UTC+2	Allbäck 11', 51'; Svensson 42'; Mellberg 45'; Rosenberg 50'	Report		Stadium: Råsunda Stadium; Attendance: 33,358; Referee: Alain Hamer (Luxembourg)

22 August International Friendly	Sweden	1–0	United States	Gothenburg, Sweden
20:30 UTC+2	Källström 55'	Report		Stadium: Ullevi; Attendance: 20,648; Referee: Kevin Blom (Netherlands)

8 September UEFA Euro 2008 qualifying	Sweden	0–0	Denmark	Solna, Sweden
20:30 UTC+2		Report		Stadium: Råsunda Stadium; Attendance: 33,082; Referee: Frank De Bleeckere (Belgium)

12 September International Friendly	Montenegro	1–2	Sweden	Podgorica, Montenegro
18:30 UTC+2	Vučinić 15'	Report	Rosenberg 71'; Prica 75'	Stadium: Stadion pod Goricom; Attendance: 6,000; Referee: Bernhard Brugger (Austria)

13 October UEFA Euro 2008 qualifying	Liechtenstein	0–3	Sweden	Vaduz, Liechtenstein
19:00 UTC+2		Report	Ljungberg 19'; Wilhelmsson 29'; Svensson 56'	Stadium: Rheinpark Stadion; Attendance: 4,131; Referee: Paolo Dondarini (Italy)

17 October UEFA Euro 2008 qualifying	Sweden	1–1	Northern Ireland	Solna, Sweden
20:30 UTC+2	Mellberg 15'	Report	Laferty 72'	Stadium: Råsunda Stadium; Attendance: 33,112; Referee: Bertrand Layec (France)

17 November UEFA Euro 2008 qualifying	Spain	3–0	Sweden	Madrid, Spain
22:00 UTC+1	Capdevila 14'; Iniesta 39'; Ramos 65'	Report		Stadium: Santiago Bernabéu Stadium; Attendance: 67,055; Referee: Roberto Rosetti (Italy)

21 November UEFA Euro 2008 qualifying	Sweden	2–1	Latvia	Solna, Sweden
20:00 UTC+1	Allbäck 1'; Källström 57'	Report	Laizāns 26'	Stadium: Råsunda Stadium; Attendance: 26,128; Referee: Wolfgang Stark (Germany)

=== 2008 ===
13 January International Friendly	Costa Rica	0–1	Sweden	San José, Costa Rica
16:15 UTC-6			Holmén 49'	Stadium: Estadio Ricardo Saprissa; Attendance: 8,000; Referee: Carlos Batres (Guatemala)

19 January International Friendly	United States	2–0	Sweden	Carson, United States
17:30 UTC-8	Robinson 15'; Donovan 48'	Report		Stadium: Home Depot Center; Attendance: 14,878; Referee: Mauricio Navarra (Canada)

6 February International Friendly	Turkey	0–0	Sweden	Istanbul, Turkey
20:30 UTC+2		Report		Stadium: BJK İnönü Stadium; Attendance: 20,000; Referee: Paolo Tagliavento (Italy)

26 March International Friendly	Brazil	1–0	Sweden	London, England
19:45 UTC+1	Pato 72'	Report		Stadium: Emirates Stadium; Attendance: 60,021; Referee: Mike Riley (England)

26 May International Friendly	Sweden	1–0	Slovenia	Gothenburg, Sweden
20:00 UTC+2	Linderoth 41'	Report		Stadium: Ullevi; Attendance: 21,118; Referee: William Collum (Scotland)

1 June International Friendly	Sweden	0–1	Ukraine	Solna, Sweden
16:00 UTC+2		Report	Nazarenko 82'	Stadium: Råsunda Stadium; Attendance: 25,203; Referee: Thomas Einwaller (Austria)

10 June UEFA Euro 2008 Group D	Greece	0–2	Sweden	Salzburg, Austria
20:45 UTC+2		Report	Ibrahimović 67'; Hansson 72'	Stadium: Stadion Wals Siezenheim; Attendance: 31,063; Referee: Massimo Busacca (Switzerland)

14 June UEFA Euro 2008 Group D	Sweden	1–2	Spain	Innsbruck, Austria
18:00 UTC+2	Ibrahimović 34'	Report	Torres 15'; Villa 90+2'	Stadium: Tivoli-Neu; Attendance: 30,772; Referee: Pieter Vink (Netherlands)

18 June UEFA Euro 2008 Group D	Russia	2–0	Sweden	Innsbruck, Austria
20:45 UTC+2	Pavlyuchenko 24'; Arshavin 50'	Report		Stadium: Tivoli-Neu; Attendance: 30,772; Referee: Frank De Bleeckere (Belgium)

20 August International Friendly	Sweden	2–3	France	Gothenburg, Sweden
21:00 UTC+2	Larsson 5'; Källström 84' (pen.)	Report	Benzema 19'; Govou 61', 77'	Stadium: Ullevi; Attendance: 23,263; Referee: Eric Braamhaar (Netherlands)

6 September 2010 FIFA World Cup qualification	Albania	0–0	Sweden	Tirana, Albania
18:45 UTC+2		Report		Stadium: Qemal Stafa; Attendance: 21,522; Referee: Alberto Undiano Mallenco (Spain)

10 September 2010 FIFA World Cup qualification	Sweden	2–1	Hungary	Solna, Sweden
20:15 UTC+1	Källström 55'; Holmén 64'	Report	Rudolf 90+2'	Stadium: Råsunda Stadium; Attendance: 28,177; Referee: Florian Meyer (Germany)

11 October 2010 FIFA World Cup qualification	Sweden	0–0	Portugal	Solna, Sweden
20:00 UTC+1		Report		Stadium: Råsunda Stadium; Attendance: 33,241; Referee: Roberto Rosetti (Italy)

19 November International Friendly	Netherlands	3–1	Sweden	Amsterdam, Netherlands
20:45 UTC+1	Van Persie 32', 48'; Kuyt 90'	Report	Källström 50'	Stadium: Amsterdam Arena; Attendance: 26,750; Referee: Zsolt Szabó (Hungary)

=== 2009 ===
24 January International Friendly	United States	3–2	Sweden	Carson, United States
17:30 UTC-8	Kljestan 17', 39' (pen.), 74'	Report	Nannskog 73'; Dahlberg 89'	Stadium: Home Depot Center; Attendance: 9,918; Referee: Silviu Petrescu (Canada)

28 January International Friendly	Mexico	0–1	Sweden	Oakland, United States
19:30 UTC-8		Report	Farnerud 57'	Stadium: McAfee Coliseum; Attendance: 46,550; Referee: Paul Ward (Canada)

11 February International Friendly	Austria	0–2	Sweden	Graz, Austria
20:30 UTC+1		Report	Elm 55'; Källström 63'	Stadium: UPC-Arena; Attendance: 11,800; Referee: Viktor Kassai (Hungary)

28 March 2010 FIFA World Cup qualification	Portugal	0–0	Sweden	Porto, Portugal
20:45 UTC+1		Report		Stadium: Estádio do Dragão; Attendance: 40,230; Referee: Frank De Bleeckere (Belgium)

1 April International Friendly	Serbia	2–0	Sweden	Belgrade, Serbia
20:15 UTC+2	Žigić 1'; Janković 82'	Report		Stadium: Stadion Partizana; Attendance: 17,830; Referee: Antonio Rubinos Pérez (Spain)

6 June 2010 FIFA World Cup qualification	Sweden	0–1	Denmark	Solna, Sweden
20:00 UTC+2		Report	Kahlenberg 22'	Stadium: Råsunda Stadium; Attendance: 33,619; Referee: Mike Riley (England)

10 June 2010 FIFA World Cup qualification	Sweden	4–0	Malta	Gothenburg, Sweden
19:00 UTC+2	Källström 22'; Majstorović 52'; Ibrahimović 56'; Berg 58'	Report		Stadium: Ullevi; Attendance: 25,271; Referee: Calum Murray (Scotland)

12 August International Friendly	Sweden	1–0	Finland	Solna, Sweden
20:00 UTC+2	Elmander 42'	Report		Stadium: Råsunda Stadium; Attendance: 15,212; Referee: Fredy Fautrel (France)

5 September 2010 FIFA World Cup qualification	Hungary	1–2	Sweden	Budapest, Hungary
20:00 UTC+2	Huszti 79' (pen.)	Report	Mellberg 8'; Ibrahimović 90+4'	Stadium: Puskás Ferenc Stadium; Attendance: 40,169; Referee: Nicola Rizzoli (Italy)

9 September 2010 FIFA World Cup qualification	Malta	0–1	Sweden	Ta' Qali, Malta
18:30 UTC+2		Report	Azzopardi 82' (o.g.)	Stadium: Ta' Qali Stadium; Attendance: 4,705; Referee: Adrian McCourt (Northern Ireland)

10 October 2010 FIFA World Cup qualification	Denmark	1–0	Sweden	Copenhagen, Denmark
20:00 UTC+2	J. Poulsen 79'	Report		Stadium: Parken Stadium; Attendance: 37,751; Referee: Manuel Mejuto González (Spain)

14 October 2010 FIFA World Cup qualification	Sweden	4–1	Albania	Solna, Sweden
20:45 UTC+2	Mellberg 6', 42'; Berg 40'; Svensson 86'	Report	Salihi 57'	Stadium: Råsunda Stadium; Attendance: 25,342; Referee: Valentin Ivanov (Russia)

18 November International Friendly	Italy	1–0	Sweden	Cesena, Italy
20:50 UTC+1	Chiellini 28'	Report		Stadium: Stadio Dino Manuzzi; Attendance: 22,827; Referee: Damir Skomina (Slovenia)
