= Åslund =

Åslund, Aaslund, or Aslund is a Swedish surname. Notable people with the surname include:

- Acke Åslund
- Anders Åslund (born 1952), Swedish economist
- Lars-Göran Åslund (born 1945), Swedish cross-country skier
- Per Åslund (born 1986), professional Swedish ice hockey player
- Martin Åslund, Swedish professional association football player
- Sanny Åslund, Swedish football (soccer) coach
- Tobias Åslund, Swedish ski-orienteering competitor
