= Nigeria at the FIFA World Cup =

International football delegation

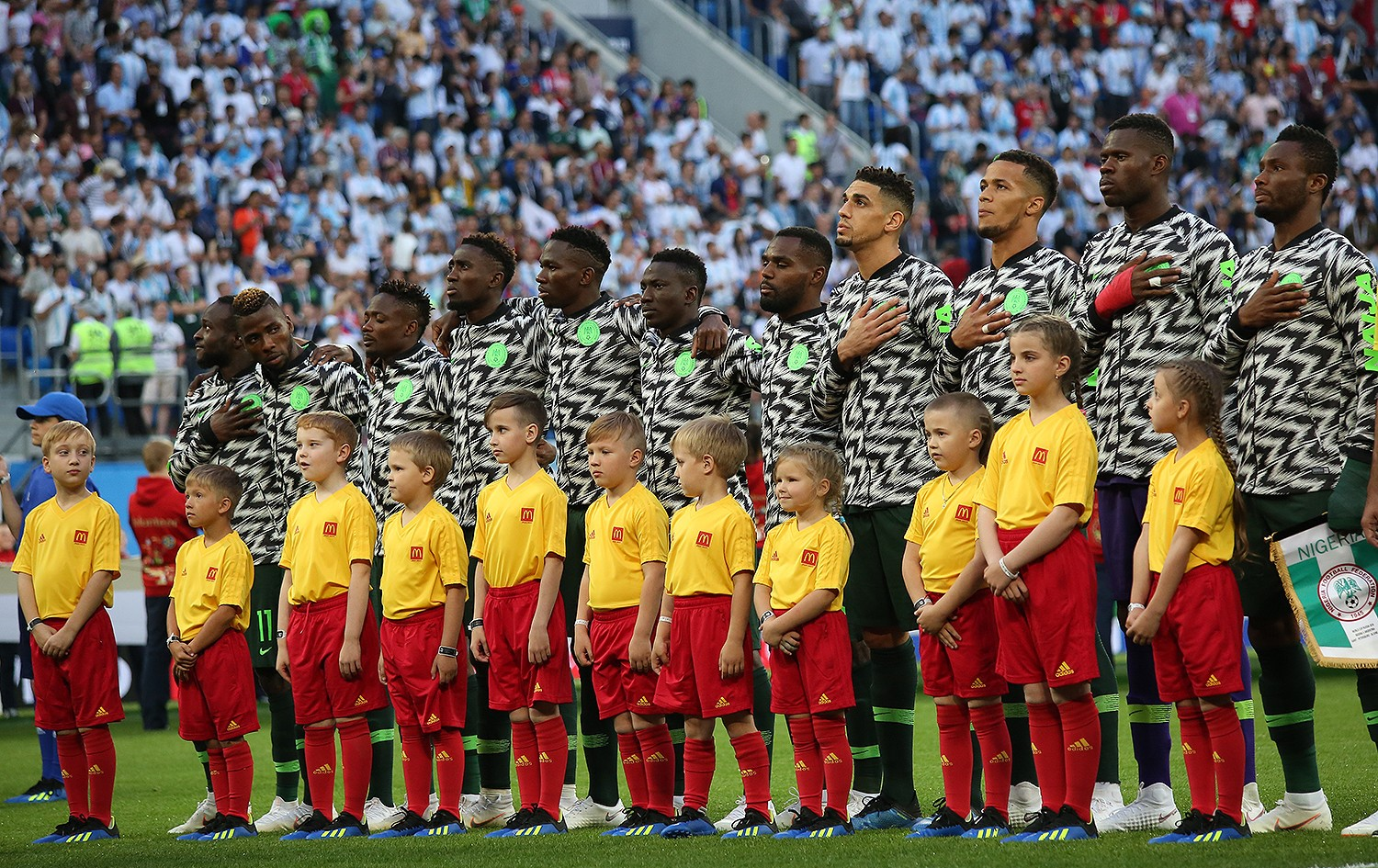
Nigeria national team at the 2018 FIFA World Cup in Russia

The FIFA World Cup is an international association football competition contested by the men's national teams of the members of Fédération Internationale de Football Association (FIFA), the sport's global governing body. The championship has been awarded every four years since the first tournament in 1930, except in 1942 and 1946, due to World War II.

The tournament consists of two parts, the qualification phase and the final phase (officially called the World Cup Finals). The qualification phase, which currently take place over the three years preceding the Finals, is used to determine which teams qualify for the Finals. The current format of the Finals involves 48 teams competing for the title, at venues within the host nation (or nations) over a period of about a month. The World Cup final is the most widely viewed sporting event in the world, with an estimated 715.1 million people watching the 2006 tournament final.

Nigeria has reached the FIFA World Cup on six occasions, the first being in 1994 where they reached the second round. Their sixth and most recent appearance was the 2018 FIFA World Cup in Russia.

== FIFA World Cup record ==
FIFA World Cup record
| Year | Round | Position | Pld | W | D | L | GF | GA |
|---|---|---|---|---|---|---|---|---|
| (Uruguay) 1930 | Part of United Kingdom | | | | | | | |
| (Italy) 1934 | Part of United Kingdom | | | | | | | |
| (France) 1938 | Part of United Kingdom | | | | | | | |
| (Brazil) 1950 | Part of United Kingdom | | | | | | | |
| (Switzerland) 1954 | Part of United Kingdom | | | | | | | |
| (Sweden) 1958 | Part of United Kingdom | | | | | | | |
| (Chile) 1962 | Did not qualify | | | | | | | |
| (England) 1966 | Withdrew (Note: All African nations withdrew due to a lack of qualifying berths.) | | | | | | | |
| (Mexico) 1970 | Did not qualify | | | | | | | |
| (West Germany) 1974 | Did not qualify | | | | | | | |
| (Argentina) 1978 | Did not qualify | | | | | | | |
| (Spain) 1982 | Did not qualify | | | | | | | |
| (Mexico) 1986 | Did not qualify | | | | | | | |
| (Italy) 1990 | Did not qualify | | | | | | | |
| (United States) 1994 | Round of 16 | 9th | 4 | 2 | 0 | 2 | 7 | 4 |
| (France) 1998 | Round of 16 | 12th | 4 | 2 | 0 | 2 | 6 | 9 |
| (South Korea) (Japan) 2002 | Group stage | 27th | 3 | 0 | 1 | 2 | 1 | 3 |
| (Germany) 2006 | Did not qualify | | | | | | | |
| (South Africa) 2010 | Group stage | 27th | 3 | 0 | 1 | 2 | 3 | 5 |
| (Brazil) 2014 | Round of 16 | 16th | 4 | 1 | 1 | 2 | 3 | 5 |
| (Russia) 2018 | Group stage | 21st | 3 | 1 | 0 | 2 | 3 | 4 |
| (Qatar) 2022 | Did not qualify | | | | | | | |
| (Canada) (Mexico) (United States); 2026 | Did not qualify | | | | | | | |
| (Morocco) (Portugal) (Spain); 2030 | To be determined | | | | | | | |
| (Saudi Arabia); 2034 | To be determined | | | | | | | |
| Total | Round of 16 | 6/23 | 21 | 6 | 3 | 12 | 23 | 30 |

== Head-to-head record ==
| Opponent | Pld | W | D | L | GF | GA | GD | Win % |
|---|---|---|---|---|---|---|---|---|
| Argentina | 5 | 0 | 0 | 5 | 4 | 9 | −5 | 0.00 |
| Bosnia and Herzegovina | 1 | 1 | 0 | 0 | 1 | 0 | +1 | 100.00 |
| Bulgaria | 2 | 2 | 0 | 0 | 4 | 0 | +4 | 100.00 |
| Croatia | 1 | 0 | 0 | 1 | 0 | 2 | −2 | 0.00 |
| Denmark | 1 | 0 | 0 | 1 | 1 | 4 | −3 | 0.00 |
| England | 1 | 0 | 1 | 0 | 0 | 0 | +0 | 0.00 |
| France | 1 | 0 | 0 | 1 | 0 | 2 | −2 | 0.00 |
| Greece | 2 | 1 | 0 | 1 | 3 | 2 | +1 | 50.00 |
| Iceland | 1 | 1 | 0 | 0 | 2 | 0 | +2 | 100.00 |
| Iran | 1 | 0 | 1 | 0 | 0 | 0 | +0 | 0.00 |
| Italy | 1 | 0 | 0 | 1 | 1 | 2 | −1 | 0.00 |
| Paraguay | 1 | 0 | 0 | 1 | 1 | 3 | −2 | 0.00 |
| South Korea | 1 | 0 | 1 | 0 | 2 | 2 | +0 | 0.00 |
| Spain | 1 | 1 | 0 | 0 | 3 | 2 | +1 | 100.00 |
| Sweden | 1 | 0 | 0 | 1 | 1 | 2 | −1 | 0.00 |
| Total | 21 | 6 | 3 | 12 | 23 | 30 | −7 | 28.57 |

== List of matches ==
| World Cup | Round | Opponent | Score | Result | Venue | Nigeria scorers |
|---|---|---|---|---|---|---|
| 1994 | Group D | Bulgaria | 3–0 | W | Dallas | Yekini, Amokachi, Amuneke |
| 1994 | Group D | Argentina | 1–2 | L | Foxborough | Siasia |
| 1994 | Group D | Greece | 2–0 | W | Foxborough | George, Amokachi |
| 1994 | Round of 16 | Italy | 1–2 (a.e.t.) | L | Foxborough | Amuneke |
| 1998 | Group D | Spain | 3–2 | W | Nantes | Adepoju, Zubizarreta (o.g.), Oliseh |
| 1998 | Group D | Bulgaria | 1–0 | W | Paris | Ikpeba |
| 1998 | Group D | Paraguay | 1–3 | L | Toulouse | Oruma |
| 1998 | Round of 16 | Denmark | 1–4 | L | Saint-Denis | Babangida |
| 2002 | Group F | Argentina | 0–1 | L | Ibaraki | — |
| 2002 | Group F | Sweden | 1–2 | L | Kobe | Aghahowa |
| 2002 | Group F | England | 0–0 | D | Osaka | — |
| 2010 | Group B | Argentina | 0–1 | L | Johannesburg | — |
| 2010 | Group B | Greece | 1–2 | L | Bloemfontein | Uche |
| 2010 | Group B | South Korea | 2–2 | D | Durban | Uche, Yakubu (pen.) |
| 2014 | Group F | Iran | 0–0 | D | Curitiba | — |
| 2014 | Group F | Bosnia and Herzegovina | 1–0 | W | Cuiabá | Odemwingie |
| 2014 | Group F | Argentina | 2–3 | L | Porto Alegre | Musa (2) |
| 2014 | Round of 16 | France | 0–2 | L | Brasília | — |
| 2018 | Group D | Croatia | 0–2 | L | Kaliningrad | — |
| 2018 | Group D | Iceland | 2–0 | W | Volgograd | Musa (2) |
| 2018 | Group D | Argentina | 1–2 | L | Saint Petersburg | Moses (pen.) |

=== 1994 FIFA World Cup ===
==== Group Stage ====
| Pos | Team | Pld | W | D | L | GF | GA | GD | Pts | Qualification |
|---|---|---|---|---|---|---|---|---|---|---|
| 1 | Nigeria | 3 | 2 | 0 | 1 | 6 | 2 | +4 | 6 | Advance to knockout stage |
| 2 | Bulgaria | 3 | 2 | 0 | 1 | 6 | 3 | +3 | 6 (Note: Head-to-head result: Argentina 0–2 Bulgaria.) | Advance to knockout stage |
| 3 | Argentina | 3 | 2 | 0 | 1 | 6 | 3 | +3 | 6 | Advance to knockout stage |
| 4 | Greece | 3 | 0 | 0 | 3 | 0 | 10 | −10 | 0 | |

Source: FIFA
Notes:
June 21, 1994
6:30 p.m. CDT

| Nigeria | 3–0 | Bulgaria |
|---|---|---|
| Yekini 21'; Amokachi 43'; Amunike 55' |

Cotton Bowl, Dallas
Attendance: 44,132
Referee: Rodrigo Badilla (Costa Rica)

June 25, 1994
4:00 p.m. EDT

| Argentina | 2–1 | Nigeria |
|---|---|---|
| Caniggia 21', 28' | | Siasia 8' |

Foxboro Stadium, Foxborough
Attendance: 54,453
Referee: Bo Karlsson (Sweden)

June 30, 1994
7:30 p.m. EDT

| Greece | 0–2 | Nigeria |
|---|---|---|
| | | George 45+2'; Amokachi 90+5' |

Foxboro Stadium, Foxborough
Attendance: 53,001
Referee: Leslie Mottram (Scotland)

==== Knockout stage ====
Round of 16

July 5, 1994
1:00 p.m. EDT (UTC–4)

| Nigeria | 1–2 (a.e.t.) | Italy |
|---|---|---|
| Amunike 25' | | R. Baggio 88', 102' (pen.) |

Foxboro Stadium, Foxborough
Attendance: 54,367
Referee: Arturo Brizio Carter (Mexico)

=== 1998 FIFA World Cup ===
==== Group Stage ====
| Pos | Team | Pld | W | D | L | GF | GA | GD | Pts | Qualification |
|---|---|---|---|---|---|---|---|---|---|---|
| 1 | Nigeria | 3 | 2 | 0 | 1 | 5 | 5 | 0 | 6 | Advance to knockout stage |
| 2 | Paraguay | 3 | 1 | 2 | 0 | 3 | 1 | +2 | 5 | Advance to knockout stage |
| 3 | Spain | 3 | 1 | 1 | 1 | 8 | 4 | +4 | 4 | |
| 4 | Bulgaria | 3 | 0 | 1 | 2 | 1 | 7 | −6 | 1 | |

Source: FIFA
13 June 1998
14:30 CEST (UTC+2)

| Spain | 2–3 | Nigeria |
|---|---|---|
| Hierro 21'; Raúl 47' | | Adepoju 24'; Zubizarreta 73' (o.g.); Oliseh 78' |

Stade de la Beaujoire, Nantes
Attendance: 35,500
Referee: Esfandiar Baharmast (United States)

19 June 1998
17:30 CEST (UTC+2)

| Nigeria | 1–0 | Bulgaria |
|---|---|---|
| Ikpeba 28' |

Parc des Princes, Paris
Attendance: 45,500
Referee: Mario Sánchez Yantén (Chile)

24 June 1998
21:00 CEST (UTC+2)

| Nigeria | 1–3 | Paraguay |
|---|---|---|
| Oruma 11' | | Ayala 1'; Benítez 58'; Cardozo 86' |

Stade de Toulouse, Toulouse
Attendance: 33,500
Referee: Pirom Un-prasert (Thailand)

==== Knockout stage ====
Round of 16

28 June 1998
21:00 CEST (UTC+2)

| Nigeria | 1–4 | Denmark |
|---|---|---|
| Babangida 77' | | Møller 3'; B. Laudrup 12'; Sand 58'; Helveg 76' |

Stade de France, Saint-Denis
Attendance: 77,000
Referee: Urs Meier (Switzerland)

=== 2002 FIFA World Cup ===
==== Group Stage ====
| Pos | Team | Pld | W | D | L | GF | GA | GD | Pts | Qualification |
|---|---|---|---|---|---|---|---|---|---|---|
| 1 | Sweden | 3 | 1 | 2 | 0 | 4 | 3 | +1 | 5 | Advance to knockout stage |
| 2 | England | 3 | 1 | 2 | 0 | 2 | 1 | +1 | 5 | Advance to knockout stage |
| 3 | Argentina | 3 | 1 | 1 | 1 | 2 | 2 | 0 | 4 | |
| 4 | Nigeria | 3 | 0 | 1 | 2 | 1 | 3 | −2 | 1 | |

Source: FIFA
2 June 2002
14:30

| Argentina | 1–0 | Nigeria |
|---|---|---|
| Batistuta 63' |

Kashima Soccer Stadium, Ibaraki
Attendance: 34,050
Referee: Gilles Veissière (France)

7 June 2002
15:30

| Sweden | 2–1 | Nigeria |
|---|---|---|
| Larsson 35', 63' (pen.) | | Aghahowa 27' |

Wing Stadium, Kobe
Attendance: 36,194
Referee: René Ortubé (Bolivia)

12 June 2002
15:30

| Nigeria | 0–0 | England |

Nagai Stadium, Osaka
Attendance: 44,864
Referee: Brian Hall (United States)

=== 2010 FIFA World Cup ===
==== Group Stage ====
| Pos | Team | Pld | W | D | L | GF | GA | GD | Pts | Qualification |
|---|---|---|---|---|---|---|---|---|---|---|
| 1 | Argentina | 3 | 3 | 0 | 0 | 7 | 1 | +6 | 9 | Advance to knockout stage |
| 2 | South Korea | 3 | 1 | 1 | 1 | 5 | 6 | −1 | 4 | Advance to knockout stage |
| 3 | Greece | 3 | 1 | 0 | 2 | 2 | 5 | −3 | 3 | |
| 4 | Nigeria | 3 | 0 | 1 | 2 | 3 | 5 | −2 | 1 | |

Source: FIFA
12 June 2010
16:00

| Argentina | 1–0 | Nigeria |
|---|---|---|
| Heinze 6' |

Ellis Park Stadium, Johannesburg
Attendance: 55,686
Referee: Wolfgang Stark (Germany)

17 June 2010
16:00

| Greece | 2–1 | Nigeria |
|---|---|---|
| Salpingidis 44'; Torosidis 71' | | Uche 16' |

Free State Stadium, Bloemfontein
Attendance: 31,593
Referee: Óscar Ruiz (Colombia)

22 June 2010
20:30

| Nigeria | 2–2 | South Korea |
|---|---|---|
| Uche 12'; Yakubu 69' (pen.) | | Lee Jung-soo 38'; Park Chu-young 49' |

Moses Mabhida Stadium, Durban
Attendance: 61,874
Referee: Olegário Benquerença (Portugal)

=== 2014 FIFA World Cup ===
==== Group Stage ====
| Pos | Team | Pld | W | D | L | GF | GA | GD | Pts | Qualification |
|---|---|---|---|---|---|---|---|---|---|---|
| 1 | Argentina | 3 | 3 | 0 | 0 | 6 | 3 | +3 | 9 | Advance to knockout stage |
| 2 | Nigeria | 3 | 1 | 1 | 1 | 3 | 3 | 0 | 4 | Advance to knockout stage |
| 3 | Bosnia and Herzegovina | 3 | 1 | 0 | 2 | 4 | 4 | 0 | 3 | |
| 4 | Iran | 3 | 0 | 1 | 2 | 1 | 4 | −3 | 1 | |

Source: FIFA
16 June 2014
16:00 BRT (UTC−3)

| Iran | 0–0 | Nigeria |

Arena da Baixada, Curitiba
Attendance: 39,081
Referee: Carlos Vera (Ecuador)

21 June 2014
18:00 AMT (UTC−4)

| Nigeria | 1–0 | Bosnia and Herzegovina |
|---|---|---|
| Odemwingie 29' |

Arena Pantanal, Cuiabá
Attendance: 40,499
Referee: Peter O'Leary (New Zealand)

25 June 2014
13:00 BRT (UTC−3)

| Nigeria | 2–3 | Argentina |
|---|---|---|
| Musa 4', 47' | | Messi 3', 45+1'; Rojo 50' |

Estádio Beira-Rio, Porto Alegre
Attendance: 43,285
Referee: Nicola Rizzoli (Italy)

==== Knockout stage ====
Round of 16

30 June 2014
13:00 BRT (UTC−3)

| France | 2–0 | Nigeria |
|---|---|---|
| Pogba 79'; Yobo 90+2' (o.g.) |

Estádio Nacional Mané Garrincha, Brasília
Attendance: 67,882
Referee: Mark Geiger (United States)

=== 2018 FIFA World Cup ===
==== Group Stage ====
| Pos | Team | Pld | W | D | L | GF | GA | GD | Pts | Qualification |
|---|---|---|---|---|---|---|---|---|---|---|
| 1 | Croatia | 3 | 3 | 0 | 0 | 7 | 1 | +6 | 9 | Advance to knockout stage |
| 2 | Argentina | 3 | 1 | 1 | 1 | 3 | 5 | −2 | 4 | Advance to knockout stage |
| 3 | Nigeria | 3 | 1 | 0 | 2 | 3 | 4 | −1 | 3 | |
| 4 | Iceland | 3 | 0 | 1 | 2 | 2 | 5 | −3 | 1 | |

Source: FIFA
16 June 2018
21:00 KALT (UTC+2)

| Croatia | 2–0 | Nigeria |
|---|---|---|
| Etebo 32' (o.g.); Modrić 71' (pen.) |

Kaliningrad Stadium, Kaliningrad
Attendance: 31,136
Referee: Sandro Ricci (Brazil)

22 June 2018
18:00 MSK (UTC+3)

| Nigeria | 2–0 | Iceland |
|---|---|---|
| Musa 49', 75' |

Volgograd Arena, Volgograd
Attendance: 40,904
Referee: Matthew Conger (New Zealand)

26 June 2018
21:00 MSK (UTC+3)

| Nigeria | 1–2 | Argentina |
|---|---|---|
| Moses 51' (pen.) | | Messi 14'; Rojo 86' |

Krestovsky Stadium, Saint Petersburg
Attendance: 64,468
Referee: Cüneyt Çakır (Turkey)

== Player records ==
=== Most appearances ===
| Rank | Player | Matches | World Cups |
|---|---|---|---|
| 1 | Joseph Yobo | 10 | 2002, 2010 and 2014 |
| 2 | Jay-Jay Okocha | 9 | 1994, 1998 and 2002 |
| 3 | Finidi George | 8 | 1994 and 1998 |
| 3 | Sunday Oliseh | 8 | 1994 and 1998 |
| 3 | Peter Rufai | 8 | 1994 and 1998 |
| 3 | Rashidi Yekini | 8 | 1994 and 1998 |
| 3 | Vincent Enyeama | 8 | 2002, 2010 and 2014 |
| 8 | Mutiu Adepoju | 7 | 1994 and 1998 |
| 8 | Uche Okechukwu | 7 | 1994 and 1998 |
| 8 | John Obi Mikel | 7 | 2014 and 2018 |
| 8 | Ahmed Musa | 7 | 2014 and 2018 |

=== Goalscorers ===
On 21 June 1994, Rashidi Yekini made history by scoring Nigeria's first-ever FIFA World Cup goal, coming in their opening match against Bulgaria in Dallas.

| Player | Goals | 1994 | 1998 | 2002 | 2010 | 2014 | 2018 |
|---|---|---|---|---|---|---|---|
| Ahmed Musa | 4 | | | | | 2 | 2 |
| Daniel Amokachi | 2 | 2 | | | | | |
| Emmanuel Amunike | 2 | 2 | | | | | |
| Kalu Uche | 2 | | | | 2 | | |
| Rashidi Yekini | 1 | 1 | | | | | |
| Samson Siasia | 1 | 1 | | | | | |
| Finidi George | 1 | 1 | | | | | |
| Mutiu Adepoju | 1 | | 1 | | | | |
| Sunday Oliseh | 1 | | 1 | | | | |
| Victor Ikpeba | 1 | | 1 | | | | |
| Wilson Oruma | 1 | | 1 | | | | |
| Tijani Babangida | 1 | | 1 | | | | |
| Julius Aghahowa | 1 | | | 1 | | | |
| Yakubu | 1 | | | | 1 | | |
| Peter Odemwingie | 1 | | | | | 1 | |
| Victor Moses | 1 | | | | | | 1 |
| Total | 22 | 7 | 5 | 1 | 3 | 3 | 3 |

== See also ==
- African nations at the FIFA World Cup
