= Zhang Yuning =

Zhang Yuning may refer to:

- Zhang Yuning (footballer, born 1977) (Chinese: 张玉宁; pinyin: Zhāng Yùníng), Chinese retired footballer, who played for Liaoning FC, Shanghai Shenhua, Queensland Roar and China national team
- Zhang Yuning (footballer, born 1997) (Chinese: 张玉宁; pinyin: Zhāng Yùníng), Chinese footballer, who plays for Beijing Sinobo Guoan and China national team
