= Four Nations Men's Football Tournament (China) =

International football tournament

Four Nations Tournament
- Founded: 2000
- Abolished: 2001
- Region: International
- Teams: 4
- Most championships: China (2 titles)

The Four Nations Tournament (Chinese: 四国足球邀请赛) was an association football tournament organized in China by the Chinese Football Association and International Sport and Leisure (ISL). The Championship was founded in 2000 as a single-elimination tournament with four national teams. However, it was abolished in 2001 due to the bankruptcy of ISL.

== Tournaments ==
Year	Host city	Winner	Runners-Up	Third Place	Fourth Place
2000	Guangzhou	China	Uruguay	Jamaica	New Zealand
2000	Shanghai	China	Iraq	Thailand	Uzbekistan
2001	Shanghai	North Korea	Kuwait	China	Trinidad and Tobago

== All-time top goalscorers ==
Rank	Name	Team	Goals	Tournament(s)
1	(China) Su Maozhen	China	4	Sep. 2000(3) and 2001(1)
2	(China) Li Weifeng	China	2	Sep. 2000(2)
2	(Thailand) Therdsak Chaiman	Thailand	2	Sep. 2000(2)
2	(China) Hao Haidong	China	2	Jan. 2000(1) and 2001(1)

== See also ==
- Four Nations Tournament (women's football)
- Yongchuan International Tournament
- China Cup
