= 2001 Four Nations Tournament =

Tournament details
- Host country: China
- City: Shanghai
- Dates: 3–5 August 2001
- Teams: 4 (from 2 confederations)
- Venue: 1 (in 1 host city)

Final positions
- Champions: North Korea (1st title)
- Runners-up: Kuwait
- Third place: China
- Fourth place: Trinidad and Tobago

Tournament statistics
- Matches played: 4
- Goals scored: 11 (2.75 per match)
- Top scorer(s): Eleven players (1 goal each)
- Best player: (North Korea) Jon Chol

The 2001 Samsung Four Nations Tournament (Chinese: 三星杯四国足球邀请赛) was the third and the final edition of the Four Nations Tournament which was held from 3 to 5 August 2001 in Shanghai, China. The tournament was planned to host by the Chinese Football Association and International Sport and Leisure (ISL). However, after the bankrupt of the ISL, the Chinese Football Association took over the whole tournament.

== Participants ==
North Korea, Kuwait, Trinidad and Tobago, Costa Rica, Ukraine, Belarus and Turkmenistan were invited to the tournament. On 26 June 2001, the participants were announced.

- China (host)
- Kuwait
- North Korea
- Trinidad and Tobago

== Venues ==
Shanghai	Shanghai Stadium is located in China
Shanghai Stadium	Shanghai Stadium is located in China
Capacity: 56,842	Shanghai Stadium is located in China

== Matches ==
All times are local, CST (UTC+8).

=== Bracket ===
Semi-finals
3 August - Shanghai
Kuwait	1 (4)
Trinidad and Tobago	1 (3)
3 August - Shanghai
China	2 (2)
North Korea	2 (4)

Final
5 August - Shanghai
Kuwait	1 (3)
North Korea	1 (5)
Third place
5 August - Shanghai
Trinidad and Tobago	0
China	3

=== Semi-finals ===
3 August 2001
17:15

Kuwait	1–1 (a.e.t.)	Trinidad and Tobago
Al-Failakawi 53'		Eve 85'
Penalties
	4–3

Shanghai Stadium, Shanghai
Referee: Lu Jun (China)
3 August 2001
19:30

China	2–2 (a.e.t.)	North Korea
Shen Si 25'; Zhang Enhua 51'		Ri Kwang-chon 48'; So Min-chol 59'
Penalties
Yu Genwei (penalty missed); Shen Si (penalty missed); Qi Hong (penalty scored); Zhang Yuning (penalty scored)	2–4	(penalty scored) Jon Yong-chol; (penalty scored) Kim Yong-jun; (penalty scored) Ri Man-chol; (penalty scored) Myong Song-chol

Shanghai Stadium, Shanghai
Referee: Kim Young-joo (South Korea)

=== Third-place playoff ===
5 August 2001
17:15

China	3–0	Trinidad and Tobago
Hao Haidong 59' (pen.); Su Maozhen 77'; Zhang Yuning 83'		Smith (red card) 44'

Shanghai Stadium, Shanghai
Referee: Naotsugu Fuse (Japan)

=== Final ===
5 August 2001
19:30

North Korea	1–1 (a.e.t.)	Kuwait
Jon Chol 61'		Al-Shammari 90+3' (pen.)
Penalties
	5–3

Shanghai Stadium, Shanghai
Referee: Zhang Yeduan (China)

2001 Four Nations Tournament

North Korea
First title

== Statistics ==
=== Goalscorers ===
There were 11 goals scored in 4 matches, for an average of 2.75 goals per match.

1 goal

- (China) Shen Si
- (China) Zhang Enhua
- (China) Hao Haidong
- (China) Su Maozhen
- (China) Zhang Yuning
- (Kuwait) Mohammad Al-Failakawi
- (Kuwait) Nohair Al-Shammari
- (North Korea) Jon Chol
- (North Korea) Ri Kwang-chon
- (North Korea) So Min-chol
- (Trinidad and Tobago) Angus Eve
