= 2010 FIFA World Cup Group B =

Football tournament group stage

Group B of the 2010 FIFA World Cup began on 12 June and ended on 22 June 2010. The group consisted of Argentina, Nigeria, South Korea and Greece. It was the third time that Argentina and Nigeria had been drawn together in the same World Cup group, after 1994 (when Greece were also in the same group) and 2002. Argentina had also been paired with South Korea in 1986.

Argentina won all three of their matches, conceding just one goal, and progressed as group winners. South Korea joined them in the knockout stage by virtue of their victory over Greece in the opening match and a draw with Nigeria in the last. That point was the only one Nigeria won, having also lost to Greece in their second match.

== Standings ==
Pos	Team	Pld	W	D	L	GF	GA	GD	Pts	Qualification
1	Argentina	3	3	0	0	7	1	+6	9	Advance to knockout stage
2	South Korea	3	1	1	1	5	6	−1	4	Advance to knockout stage
3	Greece	3	1	0	2	2	5	−3	3	
4	Nigeria	3	0	1	2	3	5	−2	1	

Source: FIFA
Rules for classification: Tie-breaking criteria
- Argentina advanced to play Mexico (runners-up of Group A) in the round of 16.
- South Korea advanced to play Uruguay (winners of Group A) in the round of 16.

== Matches ==
All times local (UTC+2)

=== South Korea vs Greece ===
In the seventh minute, Ki Sung-yong's free kick near the left corner was inadvertently flicked on by Kostas Katsouranis, before Lee Jung-soo rushed to the back post to open the scoring. The Koreans' lead was doubled through captain Park Ji-sung, who tackled Loukas Vyntra and sprinted all the way to fire a low shot into the corner of the net as they kept their 2–0 win until the final whistle.

12 June 2010
13:30

South Korea	2–0	Greece
Lee Jung-soo 7'; Park Ji-sung 52'

Nelson Mandela Bay Stadium, Port Elizabeth
Attendance: 31,513
Referee: Michael Hester (New Zealand)

South Korea	Greece

GK	18	Jung Sung-ryong
RB	22	Cha Du-ri
CB	4	Cho Yong-hyung
CB	14	Lee Jung-soo
LB	12	Lee Young-pyo
RM	17	Lee Chung-yong	(substituted off) 90+1'
CM	16	Ki Sung-yong	(substituted off) 74'
CM	8	Kim Jung-woo
LM	7	Park Ji-sung (c)
SS	19	Yeom Ki-hun
CF	10	Park Chu-young	(substituted off) 87'
Substitutions:
MF	5	Kim Nam-il	(substituted on) 74'
FW	11	Lee Seung-yeoul	(substituted on) 87'
MF	13	Kim Jae-sung	(substituted on) 90+1'
Manager:
Huh Jung-moo

GK	12	Alexandros Tzorvas
RB	15	Vasilis Torosidis	(yellow card) 56'
CB	8	Avraam Papadopoulos
CB	11	Loukas Vyntra
LB	2	Giourkas Seitaridis
RM	7	Georgios Samaras		(substituted off) 59'
CM	6	Alexandros Tziolis
CM	21	Kostas Katsouranis
LM	10	Giorgos Karagounis (c)		(substituted off) 46'
CF	9	Angelos Charisteas		(substituted off) 61'
CF	17	Theofanis Gekas
Substitutions:
DF	3	Christos Patsatzoglou		(substituted on) 46'
FW	14	Dimitris Salpingidis		(substituted on) 59'
FW	20	Pantelis Kapetanos		(substituted on) 61'
Manager:
(Germany) Otto Rehhagel

Man of the Match:
Park Ji-sung (South Korea)

Assistant referees:
Jan Hendrik Hintz (New Zealand)
Tevita Makasini (Tonga)
Fourth official:
Martín Vázquez (Uruguay)
Fifth official:
Carlos Pastorino (Uruguay)

=== Argentina vs Nigeria ===
On six minutes, an unmarked Gabriel Heinze dived forward to head home Juan Sebastián Verón's corner kick and put Argentina 1–0 up. Lionel Messi had numerous chances for Argentina following that, but on each occasion, Nigerian goalkeeper Vincent Enyeama was able to keep the margin down to one. Enyeama's saves earned him the man of the match award. Post-match, Argentina coach Diego Maradona said he was confident his side would perform well in the future.

12 June 2010
16:00

Argentina	1–0	Nigeria
Heinze 6'

Ellis Park Stadium, Johannesburg
Attendance: 55,686
Referee: Wolfgang Stark (Germany)

Argentina	Nigeria

GK	22	Sergio Romero
RB	17	Jonás Gutiérrez	(yellow card) 41'
CB	2	Martín Demichelis
CB	13	Walter Samuel
LB	6	Gabriel Heinze
DM	14	Javier Mascherano (c)
RM	8	Juan Sebastián Verón		(substituted off) 74'
LM	7	Ángel Di María		(substituted off) 85'
AM	10	Lionel Messi
CF	11	Carlos Tevez
CF	9	Gonzalo Higuaín		(substituted off) 79'
Substitutions:
MF	20	Maxi Rodríguez		(substituted on) 74'
FW	19	Diego Milito		(substituted on) 79'
DF	4	Nicolás Burdisso		(substituted on) 85'
Manager:
Diego Maradona

GK	1	Vincent Enyeama
RB	17	Chidi Odiah
CB	2	Joseph Yobo (c)
CB	6	Danny Shittu
LB	3	Taye Taiwo		(substituted off) 75'
CM	14	Sani Kaita
CM	20	Dickson Etuhu
CM	15	Lukman Haruna	(yellow card) 77'
RF	19	Chinedu Obasi		(substituted off) 60'
CF	8	Yakubu
LF	18	Victor Obinna		(substituted off) 52'
Substitutions:
FW	9	Obafemi Martins		(substituted on) 52'
FW	11	Peter Odemwingie		(substituted on) 60'
FW	12	Kalu Uche		(substituted on) 75'
Manager:
(Sweden) Lars Lagerbäck

Man of the Match:
Vincent Enyeama (Nigeria)

Assistant referees:
Jan-Hendrik Salver (Germany)
Mike Pickel (Germany)
Fourth official:
Khalil Al Ghamdi (Saudi Arabia)
Fifth official:
Hassan Kamranifar (Iran)

=== Argentina vs South Korea ===
Argentina took the lead when Lionel Messi's free kick from the left was turned into the Korean goal by Korean player Park Chu-young. A free kick was awarded on the left, and Messi's cross was headed in by Gonzalo Higuaín. In first half injury time, Korea cut the deficit when Lee Chung-yong tackled Martín Demichelis to score. Two goals from Argentina in the second half sealed a 4–1 win. Messi's shot was first saved by goalkeeper Jung Sung-ryong; his second shot hit the post before Higuaín shot the ball into an unguarded net. Higuaín completed his hat-trick by heading in a cross from substitute Sergio Agüero.

17 June 2010
13:30

Argentina	4–1	South Korea
Park Chu-young 17' (o.g.); Higuaín 33', 76', 80'		Lee Chung-yong 45+1'

Soccer City, Johannesburg
Attendance: 82,174
Referee: Frank De Bleeckere (Belgium)

Argentina	South Korea

GK	22	Sergio Romero
RB	17	Jonás Gutiérrez	(yellow card) 54'
CB	2	Martín Demichelis
CB	13	Walter Samuel		(substituted off) 23'
LB	6	Gabriel Heinze	(yellow card) 74'
DM	14	Javier Mascherano (c)	(yellow card) 55'
RM	20	Maxi Rodríguez
LM	7	Ángel Di María
AM	10	Lionel Messi
CF	9	Gonzalo Higuaín		(substituted off) 82'
CF	11	Carlos Tevez		(substituted off) 75'
Substitutions:
DF	4	Nicolás Burdisso		(substituted on) 23'
FW	16	Sergio Agüero		(substituted on) 75'
MF	5	Mario Bolatti		(substituted on) 82'
Manager:
Diego Maradona

GK	18	Jung Sung-ryong
RB	2	Oh Beom-seok
CB	4	Cho Yong-hyung
CB	14	Lee Jung-soo
LB	12	Lee Young-pyo
CM	16	Ki Sung-yong		(substituted off) 46'
CM	8	Kim Jung-woo
RW	17	Lee Chung-yong	(yellow card) 34'
AM	7	Park Ji-sung (c)
LW	19	Yeom Ki-hun	(yellow card) 10'
CF	10	Park Chu-young		(substituted off) 81'
Substitutions:
MF	5	Kim Nam-il		(substituted on) 46'
FW	20	Lee Dong-gook		(substituted on) 81'
Manager:
Huh Jung-moo

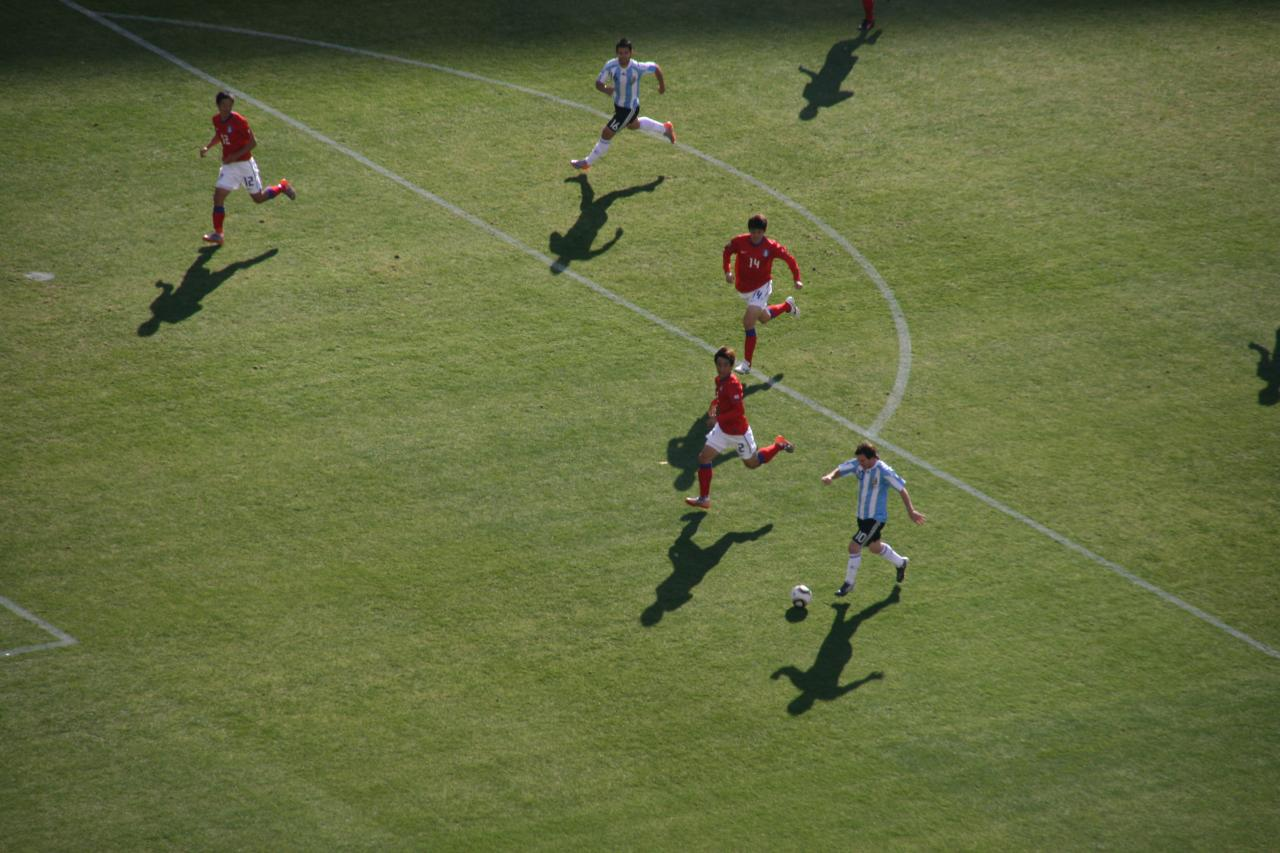
Argentina vs South Korea

Man of the Match:
Gonzalo Higuaín (Argentina)

Assistant referees:
Peter Hermans (Belgium)
Walter Vromans (Belgium)
Fourth official:
Jerome Damon (South Africa)
Fifth official:
Céléstin Ntagungira (Rwanda)

=== Greece vs Nigeria ===
Nigeria had the majority of possession in the first half hour and took an early lead when Kalu Uche scored from a free kick. The momentum of the game shifted significantly in favour of Greece when Sani Kaita was sent off for kicking towards Vasilis Torosidis when the pair were contesting for the ball.

With the extra man advantage, Greece pushed for an opening goal, and Georgios Samaras had an impressive first-half strike cleared off the line by Lukman Haruna before Dimitris Salpingidis made it 1–1 with a strike outside the penalty box that deflected into the Nigeria goal.

In the second half, Nigeria goalkeeper Vincent Enyeama could only parry a shot from Alexandros Tziolis into the path of Torosidis, who scored the second goal for Greece from the rebound.

The victory for Greece was their first ever win at the World Cup. Kaita received death threats after the match from Nigeria supporters for his dismissal from the game.

17 June 2010
16:00

Greece	2–1	Nigeria
Salpingidis 44'; Torosidis 71'		Uche 16'

Free State Stadium, Bloemfontein
Attendance: 31,593
Referee: Óscar Ruiz (Colombia)

Greece	Nigeria

GK	12	Alexandros Tzorvas
RB	16	Sotirios Kyrgiakos
CB	11	Loukas Vyntra
CB	8	Avraam Papadopoulos
LB	15	Vasilis Torosidis
DM	19	Sokratis Papastathopoulos	(yellow card) 15'	(substituted off) 37'
CM	6	Alexandros Tziolis	(yellow card) 59'
CM	21	Kostas Katsouranis
RW	10	Giorgos Karagounis (c)
LW	14	Dimitris Salpingidis
CF	17	Theofanis Gekas		(substituted off) 79'
Substitutions:
FW	7	Georgios Samaras	(yellow card) 88'	(substituted on) 37'
MF	18	Sotiris Ninis		(substituted on) 79'
Manager:
(Germany) Otto Rehhagel

GK	1	Vincent Enyeama
RB	17	Chidi Odiah
CB	2	Joseph Yobo (c)
CB	6	Danny Shittu
LB	3	Taye Taiwo		(substituted off) 55'
RM	14	Sani Kaita	(red card) 33'
CM	20	Dickson Etuhu
CM	15	Lukman Haruna
LW	12	Kalu Uche
SS	11	Peter Odemwingie		(substituted off) 46'
CF	8	Yakubu
Substitutions:
FW	19	Chinedu Obasi	(yellow card) 89'	(substituted on) 46'
DF	21	Elderson Echiéjilé		(substituted on) 55'	(substituted off) 77'
DF	5	Rabiu Afolabi			(substituted on) 77'
Manager:
(Sweden) Lars Lagerbäck

Man of the Match:
Vincent Enyeama (Nigeria)

Assistant referees:
Abraham González (Colombia)
Humberto Clavijo (Colombia)
Fourth official:
Joel Aguilar (El Salvador)
Fifth official:
William Torres (El Salvador)

=== Nigeria vs South Korea ===
22 June 2010
20:30

Nigeria	2–2	South Korea
Uche 12'; Yakubu 69' (pen.)		Lee Jung-soo 38'; Park Chu-young 49'

Moses Mabhida Stadium, Durban
Attendance: 61,874
Referee: Olegário Benquerença (Portugal)

Nigeria	South Korea

GK	1	Vincent Enyeama	(yellow card) 31'
RB	17	Chidi Odiah
CB	2	Joseph Yobo		(substituted off) 46'
CB	6	Danny Shittu
LB	5	Rabiu Afolabi
CM	13	Ayila Yussuf	(yellow card) 42'
CM	20	Dickson Etuhu
RW	19	Chinedu Obasi	(yellow card) 37'
AM	4	Nwankwo Kanu (c)		(substituted off) 57'
LW	12	Kalu Uche
CF	8	Yakubu		(substituted off) 70'
Substitutions:
DF	21	Elderson Echiéjilé		(substituted on) 46'
FW	9	Obafemi Martins		(substituted on) 57'
FW	18	Victor Obinna		(substituted on) 70'
Manager:
(Sweden) Lars Lagerbäck

GK	18	Jung Sung-ryong
RB	22	Cha Du-ri
CB	4	Cho Yong-hyung
CB	14	Lee Jung-soo
LB	12	Lee Young-pyo
RM	17	Lee Chung-yong
CM	16	Ki Sung-yong		(substituted off) 87'
CM	8	Kim Jung-woo
LM	7	Park Ji-sung (c)
SS	19	Yeom Ki-hun		(substituted off) 64'
CF	10	Park Chu-young		(substituted off) 90+3'
Substitutions:
MF	5	Kim Nam-il	(yellow card) 68'	(substituted on) 64'
MF	13	Kim Jae-sung		(substituted on) 87'
DF	15	Kim Dong-jin		(substituted on) 90+3'
Manager:
Huh Jung-moo

Man of the Match:
Park Ji-sung (South Korea)

Assistant referees:
José Cardinal (Portugal)
Bertino Miranda (Portugal)
Fourth official:
Marco Antonio Rodríguez (Mexico)
Fifth official:
José Luis Camargo (Mexico)

=== Greece vs Argentina ===
Greece approached the game defensively and let Argentina have the majority of possession, limiting them to mostly long-range shots. Greece goalkeeper Alexandros Tzorvas kept the first-half goalless with a sequence of saves, denying strikes from Sergio Aguero, Lionel Messi and Juan Sebastián Verón.

Early in the second half, Greece started to push forward, and Georgios Samaras ran on to a long clearance, but his shot was blocked by Nicolás Burdisso, and his follow up effort went wide.

Argentina eventually got the breakthrough on 77 minutes when Martín Demichelis smashed the ball into the roof of the net from a blocked shot. Martín Palermo then scored just before stoppage time after a run from Messi.

22 June 2010
20:30

Greece	0–2	Argentina
		Demichelis 77'; Palermo 89'

Peter Mokaba Stadium, Polokwane
Attendance: 38,891
Referee: Ravshan Irmatov (Uzbekistan)

Greece	Argentina

GK	12	Alexandros Tzorvas
RB	16	Sotirios Kyrgiakos
CB	11	Loukas Vyntra
CB	8	Avraam Papadopoulos
LB	15	Vasilis Torosidis		(substituted off) 55'
DM	5	Vangelis Moras
CM	19	Sokratis Papastathopoulos
CM	10	Giorgos Karagounis (c)		(substituted off) 46'
RW	6	Alexandros Tziolis
LW	21	Kostas Katsouranis	(yellow card) 30'	(substituted off) 54'
CF	7	Georgios Samaras
Substitutions:
DF	4	Nikos Spiropoulos		(substituted on) 46'
MF	18	Sotiris Ninis		(substituted on) 54'
MF	3	Christos Patsatzoglou		(substituted on) 55'
Manager:
(Germany) Otto Rehhagel

GK	22	Sergio Romero
RB	4	Nicolás Burdisso
CB	2	Martín Demichelis
CB	15	Nicolás Otamendi
LB	3	Clemente Rodríguez
DM	5	Mario Bolatti	(yellow card) 76'
RM	8	Juan Sebastián Verón
LM	20	Maxi Rodríguez		(substituted off) 63'
AM	10	Lionel Messi (c)
CF	16	Sergio Agüero		(substituted off) 77'
CF	19	Diego Milito		(substituted off) 80'
Substitutions:
MF	7	Ángel Di María		(substituted on) 63'
MF	23	Javier Pastore		(substituted on) 77'
FW	18	Martín Palermo		(substituted on) 80'
Manager:
Diego Maradona

Man of the Match:
Lionel Messi (Argentina)

Assistant referees:
Rafael Ilyasov (Uzbekistan)
Bakhadyr Kochkarov (Kyrgyzstan)
Fourth official:
Peter O'Leary (New Zealand)
Fifth official:
Matthew Taro (Solomon Islands)

== See also ==
- Argentina at the FIFA World Cup
- Greece at the FIFA World Cup
- Nigeria at the FIFA World Cup
- South Korea at the FIFA World Cup
