= Hamza Hadi =

Iraqi footballer

Hamza Hadi Muhsin
Personal information
- Full name: Hamza Hadi Muhsin
- Date of birth: 20 November 1969 (age 56)
- Place of birth: Iraq
- Position: Defender

Senior career*
Years	Team	Apps	(Gls)
1988–1991	Al-Quwa Al-Jawiya		
1991–1992	Al-Khutoot		
1992–1993	Al-Talaba		
1993–1994	Al-Quwa Al-Jawiya		
1994–1996	Ras Al Khaimah Club		
1996–1997	Al-Quwa Al-Jawiya		
1997–1998	Racing Club Beirut		
1998–1999	Safa		
1999–2000	Dibba Al-Fujairah		
2000–2001	Al-Quwa Al-Jawiya		
2001–2003	Al-Talaba		
2003–2005	Al-Shorta		
2006–2008	Al-Sinaa		

International career
2000	Iraq	19	(2)

Managerial career
- 2018–2019: Al-Quwa Al-Jawiya (Reserves Head coach)
- 2019: Al-Talaba (Assist. coach)
- 2020–2021: Al-Quwa Al-Jawiya (Assist. coach)
- 2021–2022: Al-Diwaniya
- 2022: Zakho
- * Club domestic league appearances and goals

Hamza Hadi Muhsin (Arabic: حَمْزَة هَادِي مُحْسِن; born 20 November 1969) is a former Iraqi football defender who played for the Iraq in the 2000 Asian Cup. He also played for Al-Talaba, Al-Quwa Al-Jawiya, Dibba Al-Fujairah, Al-Shorta, and Al-Sinaa

Hamza Hadi was a member of the Iraqi Under-20s that took part at the 1989 World Youth Cup in Saudi Arabia winning their group. The team lost 2-1 to the United States in the quarter-finals.

Hamza was called into the national team by Adnan Hamad at the age of 30 to play in the 2000 West-Asian Championship in Amman to replace the retired Radhi Shenaishel.

He scored a stunning 25-yard goal against Jordan, which won him an award for the best goal at the tournament.

In the semi-final, he had missed the all-important penalty in the 4-3 penalty shoot-out defeat by Syria.

He was one of many players criticised for the 4-1 defeat by Japan at the 2000 Asian Cup, Hamza kept his place until Milan Zivadinovic was sacked and new coach Adnan Hamad dropped him.

== Career statistics ==
=== International goals ===
Scores and results list Iraq's goal tally first.

No	Date	Venue	Opponent	Score	Result	Competition
1.	2 June 2000	King Abdullah Stadium, Amman	Jordan	3–0	4–1	2000 WAFF
2.	1 September 2000	Shanghai Stadium, Shanghai	Uzbekistan	2–0	2–0	2000 Four Nations Tournament

== Managerial statistics ==
As of match played 10 July 2022

Managerial record by team and tenure
Team	From	To	Record					Ref.
Team	From	To	P	W	D	L	Win %	Ref.
Al-Diwaniya FC	3 December 2021	19 February 2022	12	3	3	6	25.0	
Total			12	3	3	6	25.0	—
