= 2001 King's Cup =

Tournament details
- Host country: Thailand
- Dates: 10–17 February
- Teams: 4 (from 2 confederations)
- Venue(s): 1 (in 1 host city)

Final positions
- Champions: Sweden (2nd title)
- Runners-up: China
- Third place: Thailand
- Fourth place: Qatar

Tournament statistics
- Matches played: 8
- Goals scored: 26 (3.25 per match)
- Top scorer(s): (China) Zhang Yuning (5 goals)

The 32nd King's Cup were held from 10–17 February 2001 at Bangkok, Thailand. The King's Cup (คิงส์คัพ) is an annual football tournament; the first tournament was played in 1968.

Sweden won the tournament beating China 3–0 in the final.

== Venue ==
Bangkok
National Stadium
Capacity: 19,793
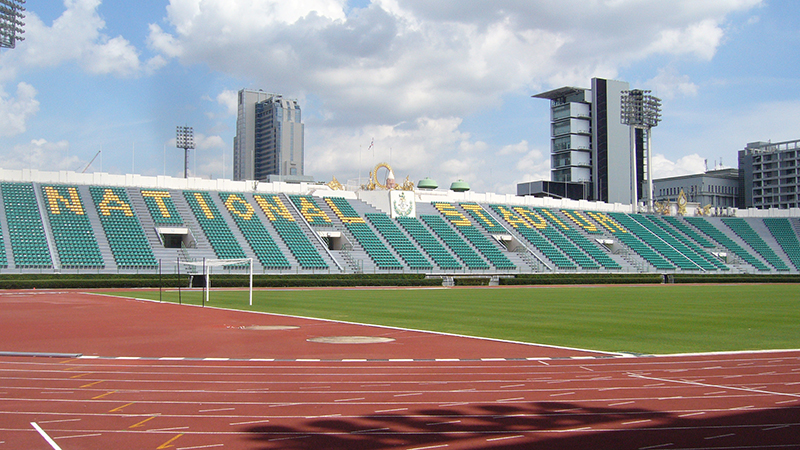

== Tournament ==
Team	Pld	W	D	L	GF	GA	GD	Pts
China	3	1	2	0	8	4	+4	5
Sweden	3	1	2	0	6	3	+3	5
Qatar	3	1	2	0	4	2	+2	5
Thailand	3	0	0	3	3	12	−9	0

Source: RSSSF

=== Matches ===
10 February 2001

China	1–1	Qatar
Su Maozhen 7'		Hamzah 62'

National Stadium, Bangkok

10 February 2001

Thailand	1–4	Sweden
Totchtawan 50'		Selaković 25'; A. Svensson 39'; Berglund 72'; Åslund 90'

National Stadium, Bangkok

12 February 2001

China	2–2	Sweden
Zhang Yuning 13', 66'		M. Svensson 67'; Åslund 78'

National Stadium, Bangkok

12 February 2001

Thailand	1–3	Qatar
Totchtawan 84'		Mustafa 54'; Hamzah 66', 73'

National Stadium, Bangkok

14 February 2001

Sweden	0–0	Qatar

National Stadium, Bangkok

14 February 2001

Thailand	1–5	China
Totchtawan 68'		Zhang Yuning 15', 23', 60'; Su Maozhen 31'; Li Tie 90'

National Stadium, Bangkok

=== Place Match ===
17 February 2001

Thailand	2–0	Qatar
Kiatisuk 17', 55'

National Stadium, Bangkok

=== Final ===
17 February 2001

China	0–3	Sweden
		Jonson 4'; Linderoth 11'; Selaković 19'

National Stadium, Bangkok

== Winner ==
2001 King's Cup champion

Sweden
2nd title
