= Tevita Makasini =

Tongan football referee

- Born: 1976 or 1977 (age 49–50); Tonga
- Other occupation: School tutor

Domestic
Years	League	Role
2006–??	Football in Tonga	Assistant referee

International
Years	League	Role
2006–present	FIFA listed	Assistant referee

Tevita Makasini (born 1976 or 1977) is a Tongan football assistant referee and a member of the FIFA International Referees List and a prominent official at the Oceania Football Confederation.

== Career ==
Makasini is a secondary school tutor at Tailulu College in Nukuʻalofa. He began his international career in the mid-2000s by assisting referees Michael Hester of New Zealand and Norbert Hauata of French Polynesia. Aside from local football and tournaments within the OFC, Makasini was appointed to the 2010 FIFA World Cup in South Africa, serving in a single group stage match between South Korea and Greece. He was the first Tongan referee at a FIFA World Cup.

In 2013, Makasini was selected for the FIFA U-17 World Cup in the United Arab Emirates, serving referee Hauata. One year later, he was appointed to the FIFA Club World Cup in Morocco, again alongside referee Hauata. In 2015, Makasini worked under referee Matthew Conger of New Zealand at the 2015 FIFA U-20 World Cup in New Zealand, serving in the games Qatar vs Colombia and Brazil vs North Korea. Makasini was chosen for two major competitions in 2017: the 2017 FIFA Club World Cup in the UAE and the 2017 FIFA U-20 World Cup in South Korea, serving in two matches (Costa Rica vs Zambia and South Africa vs Japan).

Makasini also took part in the men's tournament of the 2008 Summer Olympics in Beijing and the men's tournament of the 2016 Summer Olympics in Rio de Janeiro and, in 2018, was selected for the 2018 FIFA World Cup in Russia. In Russia, Makasini was part of the refereeing team of the group stage match between Nigeria and Iceland.
