= 2000 Four Nations Tournament (Shanghai) =

Tournament details
- Host country: China
- City: Shanghai
- Dates: 1–3 September 2000
- Teams: 4 (from 1 confederation)
- Venue: 1 (in 1 host city)

Final positions
- Champions: China (2nd title)
- Runners-up: Iraq
- Third place: Thailand
- Fourth place: Uzbekistan

Tournament statistics
- Matches played: 4
- Goals scored: 17 (4.25 per match)
- Top scorer: (China) Su Maozhen (3 goals)

The 2000 Team China Four Nations Tournament (Chinese: 中国之队四国足球邀请赛) was the second edition of the Four Nations Tournament, an official international football tournament hosted by the Chinese Football Association and International Sport and Leisure (ISL). It was held from 1 to 3 September 2000 in Shanghai, China.

== Participants ==
Four participants were determined in July 2000 after Japan, Iran and Kuwait declined the invitation.

- China (host)
- Iraq
- Thailand
- Uzbekistan

== Venues ==
| Shanghai | Shanghai Stadium is located in China |
| Shanghai Stadium | Shanghai Stadium is located in China |
| Capacity: 56,842 | Shanghai Stadium is located in China |

== Matches ==
All times are local, CST (UTC+8).

=== Bracket ===
Semi-finals
1 September - Shanghai
Iraq | 2
Uzbekistan | 0
1 September - Shanghai
China | 3
Thailand | 1

Final
3 September - Shanghai
Iraq | 1
China | 4
Third place
3 September - Shanghai
Uzbekistan | 2
Thailand | 4

=== Semi-finals ===
1 September 2000
18:00

| Iraq | 2–0 | Uzbekistan |
|---|---|---|
| Hamad 48'; Hadi 56' |

Shanghai Stadium, Shanghai
1 September 2000
20:15

| China | 3–1 | Thailand |
|---|---|---|
| Su Maozhen 8'; Qi Hong 34'; Song Lihui 86' | | Therdsak 90+2' |

Shanghai Stadium, Shanghai

=== Third-place playoff ===
3 September 2000
16:00

| Thailand | 4–2 | Uzbekistan |
|---|---|---|
| Dusit 9'; Sutee 18'; Sakesan 25'; Therdsak 30' | | Irismetov 40'; Isoqov 45' |

Shanghai Stadium, Shanghai

=== Final ===
3 September 2000
18:15

| China | 4–1 | Iraq |
|---|---|---|
| Li Weifeng 41', 72'; Su Maozhen 51', 87' | | Mohammed 57' |

Shanghai Stadium, Shanghai

2000 Four Nations Tournament

China
Second title

== Statistics ==
=== Goalscorers ===
There were 17 goals scored in 4 matches, for an average of 4.25 goals per match.

3 goals

- (China) Su Maozhen

2 goals

- (China) Li Weifeng
- (Thailand) Therdsak Chaiman

1 goal

- (Iraq) Hesham Mohammed
- (Iraq) Essam Hamad
- (Iraq) Hamza Hadi
- (China) Qi Hong
- (China) Song Lihui
- (Thailand) Dusit Chalermsan
- (Thailand) Sutee Suksomkit
- (Thailand) Sakesan Pituratana
- (Uzbekistan) Jafar Irismetov
- (Uzbekistan) Umid Isoqov
