= Acke Åslund =

Swedish painter

- Born: 27 October 1881; Östersund, Sweden
- Died: 13 February 1958 (aged 76); Stockholm, Sweden
- Occupations: Painter and printmaker

Acke Åslund (27 October 1881 – 13 February 1958) was a Swedish painter and printmaker. His work was part of the painting event in the art competition at the 1932 Summer Olympics.

Åslund is represented in the collections of the Moderna Museet ("the Museum of Modern Art") in Stockholm, the Jamtli, the Västergötland Museum ("Västergötlands museum") and the Nordic Museum ("Nordiska Museet") in Stockholm.

== Further sources ==
- Svenskt konstnärslexikon del V, pp. 788–789, Allhems Förlag, Malmö
- Daregård, Lisbeth (1981): Acke Åslund – hästmålaren. Konstvetenskapliga institutionen, Stockholms universitet
- Daregård, Lisbeth (1981): "Acke Åslund" in Jämten (Östersund: Jamtli 1906-) 1982 (75): pp.142–163. ISSN 0348-9825
- Dyrendahl, Sven (1983): "Acke Åslund: djurkonstnären, bohemen, veterinärvännen" in Svensk veterinärhistorisk och biografisk forskning: vol 2. (Sveriges veterinärförbund): pp. 463–477. ISSN 0346-2250
