= 2002 FIFA World Cup Group F =

Football tournament group stage

The Group F of the 2002 FIFA World Cup lasted from 2 to 12 June 2002. Sweden won the group, and advanced to the second round, along with England. The two sides were level on points, but Sweden won the tie-break on goals scored, and so won the group with England in second place. World Cup favourites Argentina and Nigeria failed to advance. Group F was considered by several commentators to be a 'group of death' due to the high rankings, and World Cup records of the teams in the group.

== Standings ==
Pos	Team	Pld	W	D	L	GF	GA	GD	Pts	Qualification
1	Sweden	3	1	2	0	4	3	+1	5	Advance to knockout stage
2	England	3	1	2	0	2	1	+1	5	Advance to knockout stage
3	Argentina	3	1	1	1	2	2	0	4	
4	Nigeria	3	0	1	2	1	3	−2	1	

Source: FIFA
Rules for classification: Tie-breaking criteria
- Sweden advanced to play Senegal (runner-up of Group A) in the round of 16.
- England advanced to play Denmark (winner of Group A) in the round of 16.

== Matches ==
All times local (UTC+9)

=== Argentina vs Nigeria ===
2 June 2002
14:30

Argentina	1–0	Nigeria
Batistuta 63'

Kashima Soccer Stadium, Ibaraki
Attendance: 34,050
Referee: Gilles Veissière (France)

Argentina	Nigeria

GK	12	Pablo Cavallero
CB	4	Mauricio Pochettino
CB	6	Walter Samuel	(yellow card) 51'
CB	13	Diego Placente
RWB	8	Javier Zanetti
LWB	3	Juan Pablo Sorín
CM	14	Diego Simeone	(yellow card) 90'
CM	11	Juan Sebastián Verón (c)		(substituted off) 78'
RF	10	Ariel Ortega
CF	9	Gabriel Batistuta		(substituted off) 81'
LF	7	Claudio López		(substituted off) 46'
Substitutions:
MF	18	Kily González		(substituted on) 46'
MF	16	Pablo Aimar		(substituted on) 78'
FW	19	Hernán Crespo		(substituted on) 81'
Manager:
Marcelo Bielsa

GK	1	Ike Shorunmu
RB	2	Joseph Yobo
CB	6	Taribo West
CB	5	Isaac Okoronkwo
LB	3	Celestine Babayaro
DM	16	Efe Sodje	(yellow card) 73'	(substituted off) 73'
RM	10	Jay-Jay Okocha (c)
LM	11	Garba Lawal
SS	4	Nwankwo Kanu		(substituted off) 48'
CF	17	Julius Aghahowa
CF	9	Bartholomew Ogbeche
Substitutions:
MF	7	Pius Ikedia		(substituted on) 48'
MF	15	Justice Christopher		(substituted on) 73'
Manager:
Festus Onigbinde

Man of the Match:
Juan Sebastián Verón (Argentina)

Assistant referees:
Frédéric Arnault (France)
Heiner Müller (Germany)
Fourth official:
Markus Merk (Germany)

=== England vs Sweden ===
2 June 2002
18:30

England	1–1	Sweden
Campbell 24'		Alexandersson 59'

Saitama Stadium, Saitama
Attendance: 52,721
Referee: Carlos Simon (Brazil)

England	Sweden

GK	1	David Seaman
RB	2	Danny Mills
CB	5	Rio Ferdinand
CB	6	Sol Campbell	(yellow card) 12'
LB	3	Ashley Cole
RM	7	David Beckham (c)		(substituted off) 63'
CM	18	Owen Hargreaves
CM	8	Paul Scholes
LM	20	Darius Vassell		(substituted off) 74'
CF	11	Emile Heskey
CF	10	Michael Owen
Substitutions:
MF	23	Kieron Dyer		(substituted on) 63'
MF	19	Joe Cole		(substituted on) 74'
Manager:
(Sweden) Sven-Göran Eriksson

GK	1	Magnus Hedman
RB	2	Olof Mellberg
CB	15	Andreas Jakobsson	(yellow card) 73'
CB	4	Johan Mjällby (c)
LB	16	Teddy Lučić
RM	7	Niclas Alexandersson
CM	6	Tobias Linderoth
CM	17	Magnus Svensson		(substituted off) 56'
LM	9	Freddie Ljungberg
CF	10	Marcus Allbäck	(yellow card) 45+2'	(substituted off) 80'
CF	11	Henrik Larsson
Substitutions:
MF	8	Anders Svensson		(substituted on) 56'
FW	22	Andreas Andersson		(substituted on) 80'
Managers:
Lars Lagerbäck; Tommy Söderberg

Man of the Match:
Sol Campbell (England)

Assistant referees:
Jorge Oliveira (Brazil)
Yury Dupanov (Belarus)
Fourth official:
Mark Shield (Australia)

=== Sweden vs Nigeria ===
7 June 2002
15:30

Sweden	2–1	Nigeria
Larsson 35', 63' (pen.)		Aghahowa 27'

Wing Stadium, Kobe
Attendance: 36,194
Referee: René Ortubé (Bolivia)

Sweden	Nigeria

GK	1	Magnus Hedman
RB	2	Olof Mellberg
CB	15	Andreas Jakobsson
CB	4	Johan Mjällby (c)	(yellow card) 31'
LB	16	Teddy Lučić
RM	7	Niclas Alexandersson	(yellow card) 69'
CM	6	Tobias Linderoth
CM	8	Anders Svensson		(substituted off) 83'
LM	9	Freddie Ljungberg
CF	10	Marcus Allbäck		(substituted off) 64'
CF	11	Henrik Larsson
Substitutions:
FW	22	Andreas Andersson		(substituted on) 64'
MF	17	Magnus Svensson		(substituted on) 83'
Managers:
Lars Lagerbäck; Tommy Söderberg

GK	1	Ike Shorunmu
RB	2	Joseph Yobo
CB	6	Taribo West	(yellow card) 80'
CB	5	Isaac Okoronkwo
LB	14	Ifeanyi Udeze
RM	10	Jay-Jay Okocha (c)
CM	15	Justice Christopher
LM	3	Celestine Babayaro		(substituted off) 65'
AM	21	John Utaka
CF	17	Julius Aghahowa
CF	9	Bartholomew Ogbeche		(substituted off) 70'
Substitutions:
FW	4	Nwankwo Kanu		(substituted on) 65'
MF	7	Pius Ikedia		(substituted on) 70'
Manager:
Festus Onigbinde

Man of the Match:
Henrik Larsson (Sweden)

Assistant referees:
Miguel Giacomuzzi (Paraguay)
Mat Lazim Awang Hamat (Malaysia)
Fourth official:
Toru Kamikawa (Japan)

=== Argentina vs England ===
7 June 2002
20:30

Argentina	0–1	England
		Beckham 44' (pen.)

Sapporo Dome, Sapporo
Attendance: 35,927
Referee: Pierluigi Collina (Italy)

Argentina	England

GK	12	Pablo Cavallero
CB	4	Mauricio Pochettino
CB	6	Walter Samuel
CB	13	Diego Placente
RWB	8	Javier Zanetti
LWB	3	Juan Pablo Sorín
CM	14	Diego Simeone
CM	11	Juan Sebastián Verón (c)		(substituted off) 46'
RF	10	Ariel Ortega
CF	9	Gabriel Batistuta	(yellow card) 13'	(substituted off) 60'
LF	18	Kily González		(substituted off) 64'
Substitutions:
MF	16	Pablo Aimar		(substituted on) 46'
FW	19	Hernán Crespo		(substituted on) 60'
FW	7	Claudio López		(substituted on) 64'
Manager:
Marcelo Bielsa

GK	1	David Seaman
RB	2	Danny Mills
CB	5	Rio Ferdinand
CB	6	Sol Campbell
LB	3	Ashley Cole	(yellow card) 29'
RM	7	David Beckham (c)
CM	18	Owen Hargreaves		(substituted off) 19'
CM	21	Nicky Butt
LM	8	Paul Scholes
CF	10	Michael Owen		(substituted off) 80'
CF	11	Emile Heskey	(yellow card) 50'	(substituted off) 54'
Substitutions:
MF	4	Trevor Sinclair		(substituted on) 19'
FW	17	Teddy Sheringham		(substituted on) 54'
DF	14	Wayne Bridge		(substituted on) 80'
Manager:
(Sweden) Sven-Göran Eriksson

Man of the Match:
Paul Scholes (England)

Assistant referees:
Héctor Vergara (Canada)
Mohamed Saeed (Maldives)
Fourth official:
Brian Hall (United States)

=== Sweden vs Argentina ===
12 June 2002
15:30

Sweden	1–1	Argentina
A. Svensson 59'		Crespo 88'

Miyagi Stadium, Miyagi
Attendance: 45,777
Referee: Ali Bujsaim (United Arab Emirates)

Sweden	Argentina

GK	1	Magnus Hedman
RB	2	Olof Mellberg
CB	15	Andreas Jakobsson
CB	4	Johan Mjällby (c)
LB	16	Teddy Lučić
RM	7	Niclas Alexandersson
CM	8	Anders Svensson		(substituted off) 68'
CM	6	Tobias Linderoth
LM	17	Magnus Svensson	(yellow card) 65'
CF	11	Henrik Larsson	(yellow card) 78'	(substituted off) 88'
CF	10	Marcus Allbäck		(substituted off) 46'
Substitutions:
FW	22	Andreas Andersson		(substituted on) 46'
MF	18	Mattias Jonson		(substituted on) 68'
FW	21	Zlatan Ibrahimović		(substituted on) 88'
Managers:
Lars Lagerbäck; Tommy Söderberg

GK	12	Pablo Cavallero
CB	22	José Chamot	(yellow card) 55'
CB	6	Walter Samuel
CB	4	Mauricio Pochettino
RWB	8	Javier Zanetti
LWB	3	Juan Pablo Sorín		(substituted off) 63'
DM	5	Matías Almeyda	(yellow card) 58'	(substituted off) 63'
AM	16	Pablo Aimar
RF	10	Ariel Ortega
CF	9	Gabriel Batistuta (c)		(substituted off) 58'
LF	7	Claudio López
Substitutions:
FW	19	Hernán Crespo		(substituted on) 58'
MF	11	Juan Sebastián Verón		(substituted on) 63'
MF	18	Kily González	(yellow card) 75'	(substituted on) 63'
FW	21	Claudio Caniggia	(red card) 45+2'
Manager:
Marcelo Bielsa

Man of the Match:
Johan Mjällby (Sweden)

Assistant referees:
Heiner Müller (Germany)
Michael Raggonath (Trinidad and Tobago)
Fourth official:
Peter Prendergast (Jamaica)

=== Nigeria vs England ===
12 June 2002
15:30

Nigeria	0–0	England

Nagai Stadium, Osaka
Attendance: 44,864
Referee: Brian Hall (United States)

Nigeria	England

GK	22	Vincent Enyeama
RB	16	Efe Sodje
CB	2	Joseph Yobo
CB	5	Isaac Okoronkwo
LB	14	Ifeanyi Udeze
DM	15	Justice Christopher
RM	10	Jay-Jay Okocha (c)
LM	23	Femi Opabunmi	(substituted off) 86'
AM	20	James Obiorah
CF	17	Julius Aghahowa
CF	18	Benedict Akwuegbu
Substitutions:
MF	7	Pius Ikedia	(substituted on) 86'
Manager:
Festus Onigbinde

GK	1	David Seaman
RB	2	Danny Mills
CB	5	Rio Ferdinand
CB	6	Sol Campbell
LB	3	Ashley Cole	(substituted off) 85'
RM	7	David Beckham (c)
CM	21	Nicky Butt
CM	8	Paul Scholes
LM	4	Trevor Sinclair
CF	11	Emile Heskey	(substituted off) 69'
CF	10	Michael Owen	(substituted off) 77'
Substitutions:
FW	17	Teddy Sheringham	(substituted on) 69'
FW	20	Darius Vassell	(substituted on) 77'
DF	14	Wayne Bridge	(substituted on) 85'
Manager:
(Sweden) Sven-Göran Eriksson

Man of the Match:
Jay-Jay Okocha (Nigeria)

Assistant referees:
Héctor Vergara (Canada)
Evzen Amler (Czech Republic)
Fourth official:
Toru Kamikawa (Japan)

== See also ==
- Argentina at the FIFA World Cup
- England at the FIFA World Cup
- Nigeria at the FIFA World Cup
- Sweden at the FIFA World Cup
