= Nohair Al-Shammari =

Kuwaiti footballer

Personal information
- Full name: Nohair Mohsen Al-Shammari
- Date of birth: 12 July 1976 (age 50)
- Place of birth: Al Jahra, Kuwait
- Height: 1.74 m (5 ft 8 1/2 in)
- Position: Central defender

Senior career*
Years	Team	Apps	(Gls)
1996–1999	Al-Sulaibikhat		
1998–1999	→ Al-Arabi (loan)		
1999–2011	Qadsia		
2011–2012	Al-Salmiya		

International career
1997–2002	Kuwait B	12	(0)
1996–2009	Kuwait	109	(2)
- * Club domestic league appearances and goals

Nohair Mohsen Al-Shammari (Arabic: نهير محسن زياد الشمري; born 12 July 1976) is a Kuwaiti former footballer who played as a central defender. He won 109 caps for the Kuwait national side in a career which lasted from 1996 to 2009. He played club football for Al-Sulaibikhat Al-Arabi on loan in 1998–1999, Qadsia and Al-Salmiya.

== See also ==
- List of men's footballers with 100 or more international caps
