= Sanny Åslund =

Swedish footballer and manager

Personal information
- Full name: John Sanny Åslund
- Date of birth: 29 August 1952 (age 74)
- Place of birth: Torsby, Sweden
- Height: 1.87 m (6 ft 2 in)
- Position: Striker

Youth career
- 1963–1971: Sörby IK

Senior career*
Years	Team	Apps	(Gls)
1971–1972	Degerfors IF		
1973–1974	AIK	55	(24)
1974–1976	Espanyol	11	(2)
1975–1976	→ Werder Bremen (loan)	19	(4)
1976–1978	AIK	43	(22)
1979–1980	Malmö FF	4	(1)
1980–1982	AIK	35	(10)

International career
1974–1978	Sweden U21	4	(0)
1977–1979	Sweden	5	(2)

Managerial career
- 1984–1985: IFK Täby
- 1986–1987: Väsby IK
- 1988–1990: AIK
- 1991–1992: IFK Norrköping
- * Club domestic league appearances and goals

John Sanny Åslund (born 29 August 1952) is a Swedish former football coach and former player. As a player, he represented Degerfors IF, AIK, Espanyol, and Werder Bremen during a career that spanned between 1971 and 1982. A full international between 1977 and 1979, he won five caps and scored two goals for the Sweden national team and was a part of their 1978 FIFA World Cup squad. As a coach, he most notably managed AIK and IFK Norrköping.

== Club career ==
Åslund started his career in Sörby IK in 1963 and moved on to the professionals and played for Degerfors IF in 1971, after one season he moved to AIK Fotboll, yet again he only played one season before moving on to Spanish RCD Espanyol in 1974 where he spent one year before being transferred to Werder Bremen of Germany. After his one-year spell in Germany, he returned to Swedish side AIK where he played between 1976 and 1982. During 1979 and 1980 he had a short spell in Malmö FF.

== International career ==
Åslund was an unused sub for the 1978 FIFA World Cup and managed to win five caps for the Sweden national team.

== Post-playing career ==
He is a former CEO for AIK. He is married to Annika Åslund, and he is the father of former AIK player Martin Åslund.

== Career statistics ==
=== International ===
Appearances and goals by national team and year
National team	Year	Apps	Goals
Sweden	1977	1	1
Sweden	1978	3	1
Sweden	1979	1	0
Total		5	2

Scores and results list Sweden's goal tally first, score column indicates score after each Åslund goal.

List of international goals scored by Sanny Åslund
No.	Date	Venue	Opponent	Score	Result	Competition	Ref.
1	12 November 1977	Stadion Olimpijski, Wrocław, Poland	Poland	1–1	1–2	Friendly	
2	4 April 1978	Zentralstadion, Leipzig, East Germany	East Germany	1–0	1–0	Friendly	
