= Zhang Yuning (footballer, born 1977) =

Chinese footballer and coach

Zhang Yuning 张玉宁
Personal information
- Full name: Zhang Yuning
- Date of birth: May 25, 1977 (age 49)
- Place of birth: Shenyang, Liaoning, China
- Height: 1.86 m (6 ft 1 in)
- Position: Striker

Youth career
- 1985–1993: Liaoning FC

Senior career*
Years	Team	Apps	(Gls)
1994–2002	Liaoning FC	73	(34)
1995	→ Beijing Shougang (loan)	?	(?)
2003–2006	Shanghai Shenhua	53	(21)
2006–2007	→ Queensland Roar (loan)	6	(0)
2008	Liaoning Whowin	0	(0)
Total		132	(55)

International career^{‡}
2001–2005	China	24	(8)

Managerial career
- 2009: Wenzhou Tomorrow (assistant)
- 2011: Shenyang Dongjin (assistant)
- 2014: Fujian Broncos
- * Club domestic league appearances and goals as of 5 May 2010 ‡ National team caps and goals as of 5 May 2010

Zhang Yuning (simplified Chinese: 张玉宁; traditional Chinese: 張玉寧; pinyin: Zhāng Yùníng) (born May 25, 1977 in Shenyang) is a former Chinese international footballer. After retiring from football he took up coaching to become the reserve team coach for Wenzhou Tomorrow until he left at the beginning of the 2010 league season.

== Playing career ==
Zhang started his football career with his local football team Liaoning FC, where he progressed to their senior team in 1994 at the dawn of full professionalism within the Chinese game. He was initially loaned out to third-tier club Beijing Shougang before going on to debut for Liaoning, where he soon made a name for himself when he was the club's top goalscorer in the 1997 campaign. By the following season he would show himself to be a prolific striker who helped guide Liaoning to promotion to the top tier. Once in the top division Zhang quickly adapted to the higher demands and narrowly saw Liaoning miss out on winning the league title.

As a young, tall and strong prolific centre forward, Zhang quickly caught the imagination of the Chinese tabloid press who often referred to him as the David Beckham of China, however at the height of his popularity on April 26, 2000 he was involved in a serious car accident. It was discovered that Zhang was drink driving while driving some teammates and friends home, however while Zhang sustained minor injuries his teammate Qu Leheng sustained serious injuries, which resulted in Qu being left a paraplegic and consigned to a wheelchair for life. Qu would go on to successfully sue Zhang 2.34 million yuan (282,000 US dollars) for compensation on November 22, 2004. Zhang would also go on to make a public apology to Qu and despite publicly believing that the compensation was especially high he decided to abnegate his right to ask for a retrial.

While his trail to Qu went on Zhang was able to return to his football career and made his international debut against Egypt in a friendly on January 17, 2001 that ended in a 0–0 draw. English club Leicester City were interested in signing Zhang on loan in November 2001 however, the Home Office was doubtful that he had not played regularly for the national team, rejecting his application for a work permit. Leicester did rekindle their interest in him in November 2004, after being recommended by Bobby Houghton, though he again failed in his work permit. Instead Zhang signed on for Shanghai Shenhua for a reported ten million yuan in the 2003 league season where he went on to win the league title in his debut campaign with them. Unfortunately in 2013 the Chinese Football Association would revoke the league title after it was discovered the Shenhua General manager Lou Shifang had bribed officials to be bias to Shenhua in games that season.

Unable to replicate his performances from his youth Shenhua decided to loan Zhang to Australian side Queensland Roar where he played under Frank Farina. His time at the club was not a success and he only made six appearances, which was not helped by his pack-a-day smoking habit. Shenhua would eventually decide to sell Zhang back to his hometown club of Liaoning for 600,000 yuan in 2008, however he would not play for them and decided to retire at the end of the season.

== Career statistics ==
=== Club ===
Last update: 23 Nov 2015

Season	Team	Country	Division	Apps	Goals
1994	Liaoning	China	1	?	?
1995	Beijing Shougang	China	2	?	?
1996	Liaoning	China	2	?	?
1997	Liaoning	China	2	?	11
1998	Liaoning	China	2	?	14
1999	Liaoning	China	1	23	8
2000	Liaoning	China	1	17	11
2001	Liaoning	China	1	19	11
2002	Liaoning	China	1	13	5
2003	Shanghai Shenhua	China	1	22	13
2004	Shanghai Shenhua	China	1	10	3
2005	Shanghai Shenhua	China	1	14	5
2006	Shanghai Shenhua	China	1	8	1
06/07	Queensland Roar FC	Australia	1	6	0
2008	Liaoning	China	1	0	0

=== International goals ===
#	Date	Venue	Opponent	Score	Result	Competition
1	February 12, 2001	National Stadium, Bangkok, Thailand	Sweden	1–0	2–2	2001 King's Cup
2	February 12, 2001	National Stadium, Bangkok, Thailand	Sweden	2–0	2–2	2001 King's Cup
3	February 14, 2001	National Stadium, Bangkok, Thailand	Thailand	1–0	5–1	2001 King's Cup
4	February 14, 2001	National Stadium, Bangkok, Thailand	Thailand	2–0	5–1	2001 King's Cup
5	February 14, 2001	National Stadium, Bangkok, Thailand	Thailand	4–0	5–1	2001 King's Cup
6	August 5, 2001	Shanghai Stadium, Shanghai, China	Trinidad and Tobago	3–0	3–0	2001 Four Nations Tournament
7	February 3, 2004	Tianhe Stadium, Guangzhou, China	Finland	1–0	2–1	Friendly
8	February 7, 2004	Shenzhen Stadium, Shenzhen, China	Finland	1–0	2–1	Friendly

== Honours ==
=== Player ===
==== Club ====
Liaoning F.C.

- Chinese FA Super Cup: 1999

Shanghai Shenhua

- Chinese Jia-A League: 2003 (revoked due to match-fixing scandal)

==== Individual ====
- Chinese Jia-B League Top Goalscorer: 1998
