= Su Maozhen =

Chinese footballer

Personal information
- Date of birth: 30 July 1972 (age 54)
- Place of birth: Qingdao, Shandong, China
- Height: 1.86 m (6 ft 1 in)
- Position: Second striker

Senior career*
Years	Team	Apps	(Gls)
1991–2002	Shandong Luneng	166	(65)

International career
1994–2002	China	53	(27)

Managerial career
- 2006: Shandong Luneng U17
- 2006–2008: China U23 (assistant)
- 2009–2011: China U20
- 2011–2012: China U16
- 2013–2015: Qingdao Hainiu
- 2015–2016: Qingdao Jonoon
- 2016–2018: Qingdao Huanghai (managing director)
- 2018: Tianjin Teda U19
- 2019–2021: Beijing Sport University
- 2023–2024: Qingdao Hainiu (assistant)
- 2025–: Shandong Taishan (vice general manager)
- 2026: Shandong Taishan
Medal record
Representing China
Men's football
AFC U-16 Championship
Bronze medal – third place	1988 Thailand	Team
- * Club domestic league appearances and goals

Su Maozhen (Chinese: 宿茂臻; pinyin: Sù Màozhēn; born 30 July 1972) is a Chinese football coach and former international player.

As a player, he spent his whole career with Shandong Luneng as a striker where he won several league and cups with them as well as being a regular for the Chinese national team, playing at the 2002 FIFA World Cup. After his retirement as a player he eventually moved into management where he started off as an assistant before becoming the head coach of the China under-20 national team.

== Club career ==
Early on in his career, Su had two brief trial periods with Manchester United in the 1989–90 and 1991–92 seasons, during which he made a number of appearances for the Junior A team alongside future stars such as Ryan Giggs, David Beckham and Paul Scholes. Once Su returned to China and established himself as regular for Shandong Luneng, he then started his rise to prominence. This was first shown when he helped Shandong win the 1995 Chinese FA Cup and continued the following 1996 Chinese Jia-A League season when he was the league's top goalscorer with 13 league goals, despite Shandong only finishing in 5th in the league. By the 1999 league season, he had been made club captain, and led them to the league and cup double, resulting in him being named Chinese Footballer of the Year.

== International career ==
Su Maozhen made his first senior international cap against Saudi Arabia on 23 January 1994 in a 1–0 defeat. However, he struggled to make much of an impact and was sidelined until he became a regular for Shandong and win the 1995 Chinese FA Cup with them. Given another chance to make an impression for his country he was selected for the squad to play against Macau for China's 1996 AFC Asian Cup qualification campaign where on 30 January 1996 he scored his debut goal in a 7–1 victory. After that game he quickly started to a regular for his country and was included in the squads that reached the quarter-finals in the 1996 AFC Asian Cup and then semi-finals of the 2000 AFC Asian Cup while also being an integral member of the squad that qualified for 2002 FIFA World Cup. During the tournament he only made one appearance against Costa Rica and once the World Cup campaign finished Su soon retired from international football.

== International goals ==
No.	Date	Venue	Opponent	Score	Result	Competition
1	30 January 1996	Mong Kok Stadium, Kowloon, Hong Kong	Macau	2–1	7–1	1996 AFC Asian Cup qualification
2	1 February 1996	Mong Kok Stadium, Kowloon, Hong Kong	Philippines	5–0	7–0	1996 AFC Asian Cup qualification
3	1 February 1996	Mong Kok Stadium, Kowloon, Hong Kong	Philippines	7–0	7–0	1996 AFC Asian Cup qualification
4	1 February 1997	Tianhe Stadium, Guangzhou, China	United States	1–1	1–1	Friendly
5	23 January 2000	Thống Nhất Stadium, Ho Chi Minh City, Vietnam	Philippines	1–0	8–0	2000 AFC Asian Cup qualification
6	23 January 2000	Thống Nhất Stadium, Ho Chi Minh City, Vietnam	Philippines	2–0	8–0	2000 AFC Asian Cup qualification
7	23 January 2000	Thống Nhất Stadium, Ho Chi Minh City, Vietnam	Philippines	3–0	8–0	2000 AFC Asian Cup qualification
8	23 January 2000	Thống Nhất Stadium, Ho Chi Minh City, Vietnam	Philippines	5–0	8–0	2000 AFC Asian Cup qualification
9	23 January 2000	Thống Nhất Stadium, Ho Chi Minh City, Vietnam	Philippines	7–0	8–0	2000 AFC Asian Cup qualification
19	26 January 2000	Thống Nhất Stadium, Ho Chi Minh City, Vietnam	Guam	3–0	19–0	2000 AFC Asian Cup qualification
11	26 January 2000	Thống Nhất Stadium, Ho Chi Minh City, Vietnam	Guam	6–0	19–0	2000 AFC Asian Cup qualification
12	26 January 2000	Thống Nhất Stadium, Ho Chi Minh City, Vietnam	Guam	15–0	19–0	2000 AFC Asian Cup qualification
13	29 January 2000	Thống Nhất Stadium, Ho Chi Minh City, Vietnam	Vietnam	1–0	2–0	2000 AFC Asian Cup qualification
14	1 September 2000	Shanghai Stadium, Shanghai, China	Thailand	1–0	3–1	2000 Four Nations Tournament (Shanghai)
15	3 September 2000	Shanghai Stadium, Shanghai, China	Iraq	2–0	4–1	2000 Four Nations Tournament (Shanghai)
16	3 September 2000	Shanghai Stadium, Shanghai, China	Iraq	4–1	4–1	2000 Four Nations Tournament (Shanghai)
17	13 October 2000	International Olympic Stadium, Tripoli, Lebanon	South Korea	1–1	2–2	2000 AFC Asian Cup
18	5 August 2001	Shanghai Stadium, Shanghai, China	Trinidad and Tobago	2–0	3–0	2001 Four Nations Tournament

== Management career ==
In 2006, Su graduated from Salford Business School, University of Salford in the United Kingdom, having completed a master's degree in management. In 2006 he returned to his former club, Shandong Luneng where he was offered their under-17 management position. In November 2006, he was appointed as Assistant Manager of the Chinese Olympic football team by the Chinese Football Association (CFA) in their preparations for the 2008 Beijing Games. Once the tournament finished he was offered the chance to become the Head coach of the Chinese under-20 team. His first assignment was to qualify for the 2010 AFC U-19 Championship, which he achieved by winning all of the qualifying games while during the tournament China reached the quarter-finals.

In February 2025, Su returned to Shandong Taishan as vice general manager of the club.

On 28 July 2026, Shandong Taishan annouanced Su's departure as first team head coach.

== Honours ==
=== Player ===
Shandong Luneng

- Chinese Jia-A League: 1999
- Chinese FA Cup: 1995, 1999
