= Martin Åslund =

Swedish footballer (born 1976)

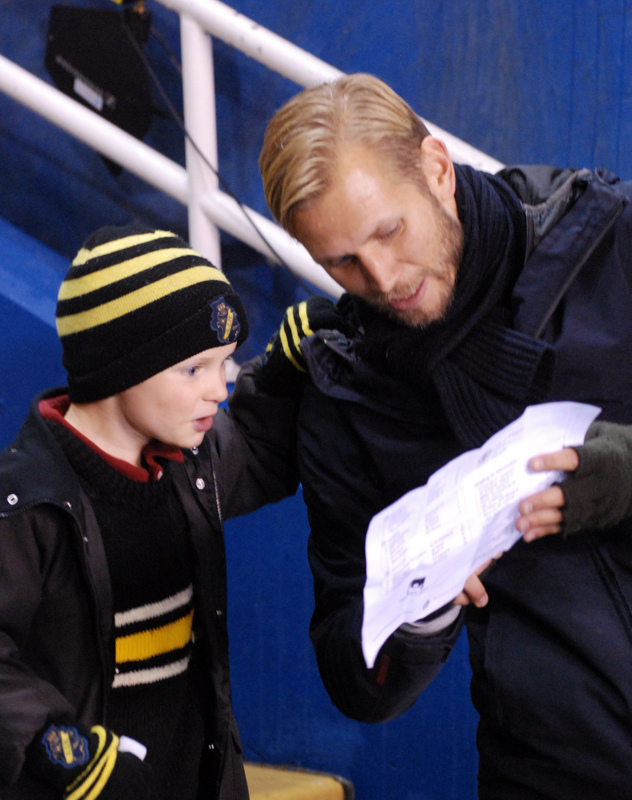

Personal information
- Date of birth: 10 November 1976 (age 49)
- Place of birth: Stockholm, Sweden
- Height: 1.86 m (6 ft 1 in)
- Position: Midfielder

Youth career
- 1981–1982: AIK
- 1983–1990: IFK Täby
- 1991–1992: Enebybergs IF
- 1993–1994: Djurgårdens IF

Senior career*
Years	Team	Apps	(Gls)
1995–1996	Djurgårdens IF	26	(1)
1997–1998	IFK Norrköping	48	(4)
1999–2004	AIK	94	(6)
2005	Salernitana	12	(1)
2005–2007	Viborg FF	56	(4)
2008–2009	Assyriska Föreningen	23	(1)
Total		259	(17)

International career
1992–1993	Sweden U17	15	(0)
1994	Sweden U19	6	(1)
1997–1998	Sweden U21	14	(1)
1998–2001	Sweden	4	(2)
- * Club domestic league appearances and goals

John Allan Martin Åslund (born 10 November 1976) is a Swedish former professional footballer who played as a midfielder. He represented Djurgårdens IF, IFK Norrköping, AIK, Salernitana, Viborg FF, and Assyriska during a career that spanned between 1994 and 2009. He won four caps and scored two goals for the Sweden national team between 1998 and 2001.

== Club career ==
Åslund joined Djurgårdens IF in 1993 and won the 1994 JSM för klubblag with the Djurgården under-18 squad. In 1995, he made his Allsvenskan debut for Djurgården in a 2–2 draw against Västra Frölunda and played for Djurgården until they were relegated in 1996.

== International career ==
After having appeared for the Sweden U17, U19, and U21 teams, Åslund made his full international debut for the Sweden national team 14 October 1998 in a UEFA Euro 2000 qualifier against Bulgaria. He started the game as a forward alongside Henrik Larsson until the 71st minute when he was replaced by Jesper Blomqvist in a 1–0 win.

Åslund scored his first goal for Sweden in a friendly 4–1 win against Thailand on 10 February 2001 after coming on as a substitute for Rade Prica in the 66th minute. He won a total of four caps during his career, scoring two goals.

== Personal life ==
He is the son of the former Sweden international Sanny Åslund who was a squad member at the 1978 FIFA World Cup. After his footballing career he has worked as a football pundit for Swedish television.

== Career statistics ==
Appearances and goals by national team and year
National team	Year	Apps	Goals
Sweden	1998	1	0
Sweden	1999	0	0
Sweden	2000	0	0
Sweden	2001	3	2
Total		4	2

List of international goals scored by Martin Åslund
No.	Date	Venue	Opponent	Score	Result	Competition	Ref.
1	10 February 2001	National Stadium, Bangkok, Thailand	Thailand	4–1	4–1	2001 King's Cup	
2	12 February 2001	National Stadium, Bangkok, Thailand	China	2–2	2–2	2001 King's Cup	

== Honours ==
Djurgårdens IF

- Division 1 Norra: 1994

AIK

- Svenska Cupen: 1998–99
