= Kalu Uche =

Nigerian footballer (born 1982)

Personal information
- Full name: Kalu Uche
- Date of birth: 15 November 1982 (age 43)
- Place of birth: Aba, Abia, Nigeria
- Height: 1.79 m (5 ft 10 in)
- Position: Forward

Youth career
- 1998: Enyimba International
- 1999–2000: Iwuanyanwu Nationale

Senior career*
Years	Team	Apps	(Gls)
2000–2001	Espanyol B	2	(0)
2001–2005	Wisła Kraków	54	(11)
2004–2005	→ Bordeaux (loan)	24	(1)
2005–2011	Almería	172	(39)
2011–2012	Neuchâtel Xamax	14	(6)
2012	Espanyol	15	(5)
2012–2013	Kasımpaşa	34	(19)
2013–2014	El Jaish	8	(4)
2014–2015	Al-Rayyan	16	(17)
2015	Levante	16	(5)
2015	Pune City	11	(4)
2016–2017	Almería	28	(5)
2017–2018	Delhi Dynamos	15	(13)
2018–2019	ATK	11	(1)
2021–2022	Águilas	31	(4)
Total		451	(134)

International career
2003–2012	Nigeria	40	(6)
- * Club domestic league appearances and goals

Kalu Uche (born 15 November 1982) is a Nigerian former professional footballer who played as a forward.

He spent most of his career in Spain, mainly with Almería, with which he amassed La Liga totals of 117 matches and 27 goals (212 appearances and 45 goals all competitions comprised). He also competed professionally in Poland, France, Switzerland, Turkey, Qatar and India.

A Nigeria international in the 2000s, Uche represented his country at the 2010 World Cup and the 2010 Africa Cup of Nations.

== Club career ==
=== Early years ===
Born in Aba, Abia, Uche's career began in Nigeria with Osusu pillars F.C, Aba, and later Enyimba International F.C. and Iwuanyanwu Nationale. In the 2000–01 season he joined RCD Espanyol B in Spain, failing to receive any first-team opportunities and competing with the reserves in the third division.

=== Wisła Kraków ===
In 2001, Uche transferred to Wisła Kraków, playing there until 2005 – winning the Ekstraklasa three times and Polish Cup twice – except for the 2004–05 campaign when he represented Bordeaux on loan.

In mid-2003, Uche was in talks to join Dutch side Ajax Amsterdam, but the deal fell through as Wisła were unwilling to sell the player at that time. Uche subsequently went on a strike and requested for his contract to be terminated unilaterally, resulting in a six-month ban by the club. FIFA rejected Uche's appeal in December 2003, and he returned to training with Wisła shortly after.

=== Almería ===
For the 2005–06 season, Uche moved to UD Almería, and was instrumental in helping the Andalusia club to its first ever La Liga promotion in his second year, scoring eight league goals (with three in the last five matches). He made his debut in the competition on 26 August 2007, coming from the bench in a 3–0 away win against Deportivo de La Coruña.

On 11 January 2009, profiting from the absence of first-choice Álvaro Negredo, Uche netted both goals in a 2–2 draw at Espanyol. On 5 December, he scored his team's second goal at Real Madrid for the 2–1, but the hosts eventually rallied back to 4–2.

In the following summer, Negredo was sold to Sevilla FC – via Real Madrid – and Uche became Almería's most important attacking reference. He finished the 2009–10 season with a career-best in Spain nine goals, including a brace on 4 May 2010 against Villarreal CF in a 4–2 home win, which all but certified permanence in the top level for another year.

Uche was only available to manager Juan Manuel Lillo one month into 2010–11, due to fitness problems. In the second match upon his return, on 26 September 2010, he scored twice in a 2–0 victory at Deportivo for Almería's first win of the campaign, going on to net seven in 32 games as the club was finally relegated after a four-year stay.

=== Neuchâtel and Espanyol ===
On 4 August 2011, Uche joined Swiss Super League side Neuchâtel Xamax on a two-year deal. He left the following transfer window, however, and returned to Espanyol, immerse in a deep injury crisis to its attacking line, signing until June 2013.

Uche opened his scoring account for his new club on 25 February 2012 in a 1–2 home loss against Levante UD. On 11 March, he put three past Rayo Vallecano in another home fixture (5–1).

=== Late career ===
On 20 July 2012, Uche moved to Turkish club Kasımpaşa SK, signing a three-year contract. On 1 October of the following year he switched teams and countries again, penning a deal with El Jaish SC in Qatar.

Uche signed an 18-month contract with Levante UD on 29 January 2015, after a short stint at Al Rayyan SC. On 7 January 2016, he returned to Almería, after spending six months at FC Pune City. He began his third spell at the former club in February 2017, joining until 30 June as a free agent.

== International career ==
Uche made his debut for Nigeria on 21 June 2003, in an African Nations Cup qualifier against Angola, scoring in the process. He represented the nation at the 2010 Africa Cup of Nations, going scoreless for the eventual third-placed team.

After a solid club season, Uche was picked for that year's FIFA World Cup in South Africa. On 17 June, against Greece, he opened the score from a free kick, but the Super Eagles soon were reduced to ten men and lost 1–2. In the third and last game he also scored the opener, eventually earning Nigeria's only point in the competition in a 2–2 draw with South Korea.

=== International goals ===
Goal #	Date	Venue	Opponent	Score	Result	Competition
1.	21 June 2003	Samuel Ogbemudia, Benin City, Nigeria	Angola	1–2	2–2	2004 African Cup of Nations qualification
2.	27 May 2008	UPC-Arena, Graz, Austria	Austria	1–1	1–1	Friendly
3.	17 June 2010	Free State, Bloemfontein, South Africa	Greece	0–1	2–1	2010 FIFA World Cup
4.	22 June 2010	Moses Mabhida, Durban, South Africa	South Korea	1–0	2–2	2010 FIFA World Cup
5.	15 November 2011	Ahmadu Bello, Kaduna, Nigeria	Zambia	1–0	2–0	Friendly
6.	12 April 2012	Maktoum Bin Rashid Al Maktoum, Dubai, United Arab Emirates	Egypt	1–2	2–3	Friendly

== Personal life ==
Uche's younger brother, Ikechukwu Uche, was also a footballer. Also a forward, he too spent most of his senior career in Spain (they are not related to two other players, Uche Okechukwu and Ikechukwu Kalu). He is married to Stephanie Oforka, former MBGN Universe, they have two children.

== Honors ==
Wisła Kraków

- Ekstraklasa: 2000–01, 2002–03, 2003–04
- Polish Cup: 2001–02, 2002–03

Nigeria

- Africa Cup of Nations third place: 2010
