= Wolfgang Stark =

German football referee

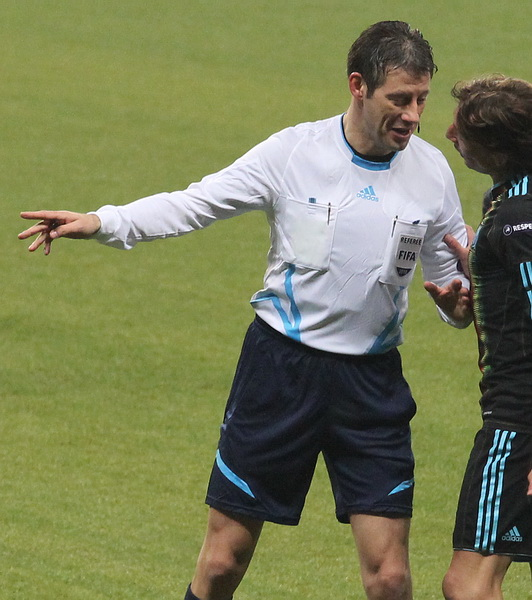
- Stark in 2010
- Born: 20 November 1969 (age 57); Landshut, West Germany
- Other occupation: Bank teller

Domestic
Years	League	Role
1994–2017	DFB	Referee
1994–2017	2. Bundesliga	Referee
1997–2017	Bundesliga	Referee

International
Years	League	Role
1999–2014	FIFA listed	Referee

Wolfgang Stark (born 20 November 1969) is a German former football referee who is based in Ergolding. He refereed for DJK Altdorf of the Bavarian Football Association.

== Refereeing career ==
In addition to German domestic competitions, Stark officiated numerous matches in the UEFA Champions League and UEFA Europa League. He was also selected as referee for various international tournaments, including 2008 Olympics, 2010 FIFA World Cup, and UEFA Euro 2012.

In 2007, he refereed five matches at the 2007 FIFA U-20 World Cup, including the semi-final between Chile and Argentina. The match finished as a 3–0 win for Argentina with Stark issuing seven yellow cards (out of nine) and two red cards against Chile. Following the match, the Chilean players were restrained by members of the Toronto Police when they approached to meet fans outside the arena, as the police misunderstood the players' original intentions. The misunderstanding led the police to aggressively restrain Chilean players who defended fiercely, causing the use of electricity and pepper gas by the police. Some players were detained for several hours before being released. Stark left the stadium under escort, although he was not involved in the clash.

Stark retired from officiating in 2017 because he reached the age limit for German referees, which is 47. His final Bundesliga match officiated was between Borussia Mönchengladbach and Darmstadt 98.

=== 2010 FIFA World Cup ===
Date	Time (UTC+2)	Team 1	Score	Team 2	Round	Attendance
12 June 2010	16:00	Argentina	1–0	Nigeria	Group B	55,686
23 June 2010	16:00	Slovenia	0–1	England	Group C	36,893
26 June 2010	16:00	Uruguay	2–1	South Korea	Round of 16	30,597

== Personal life ==
Stark lives in Ergolding, is married, and has one child.
