= Razmik =

Razmik or Razmig (Armenian: Ռազմիկ) is an Armenian male name meaning "warrior" that can refer to:

- Razmik Amyan (1982), Armenian singer
- Razmik Davoyan (1940), Armenian poet
- Razmik Grigoryan (footballer) (1971), Armenian former football midfielder
- Razmik Grigoryan (1985), Armenian filmmaker
- Razmik Martirosyan (1959), Armenian politician
- Razmik Mouradian (1938), Russian-Armenian sculptor
- Razmik Panossian (1964), Canadian-Armenian political scientist
- Razmik Tonoyan (1988), Ukrainian sambist
- Razmig Hovaghimian, Armenian-American entrepreneur
- Razmig Mavlian, Canadian-Armenian video game developer
