= Diaspora =

Widely scattered population from a single original territory

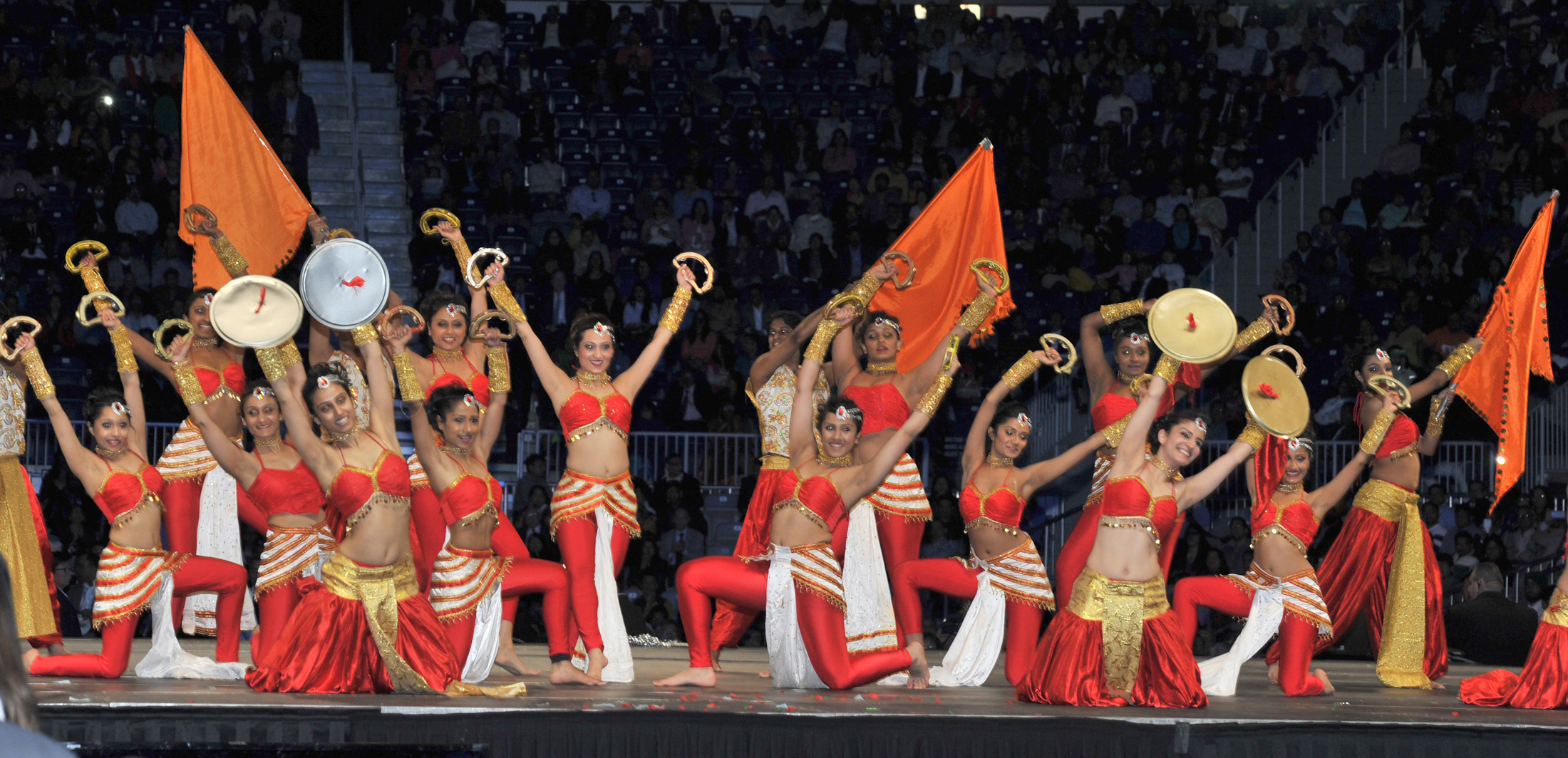
India has the world's largest annual emigration. Pictured at Ricoh Coliseum, in Toronto, Canada, on April 15, 2015

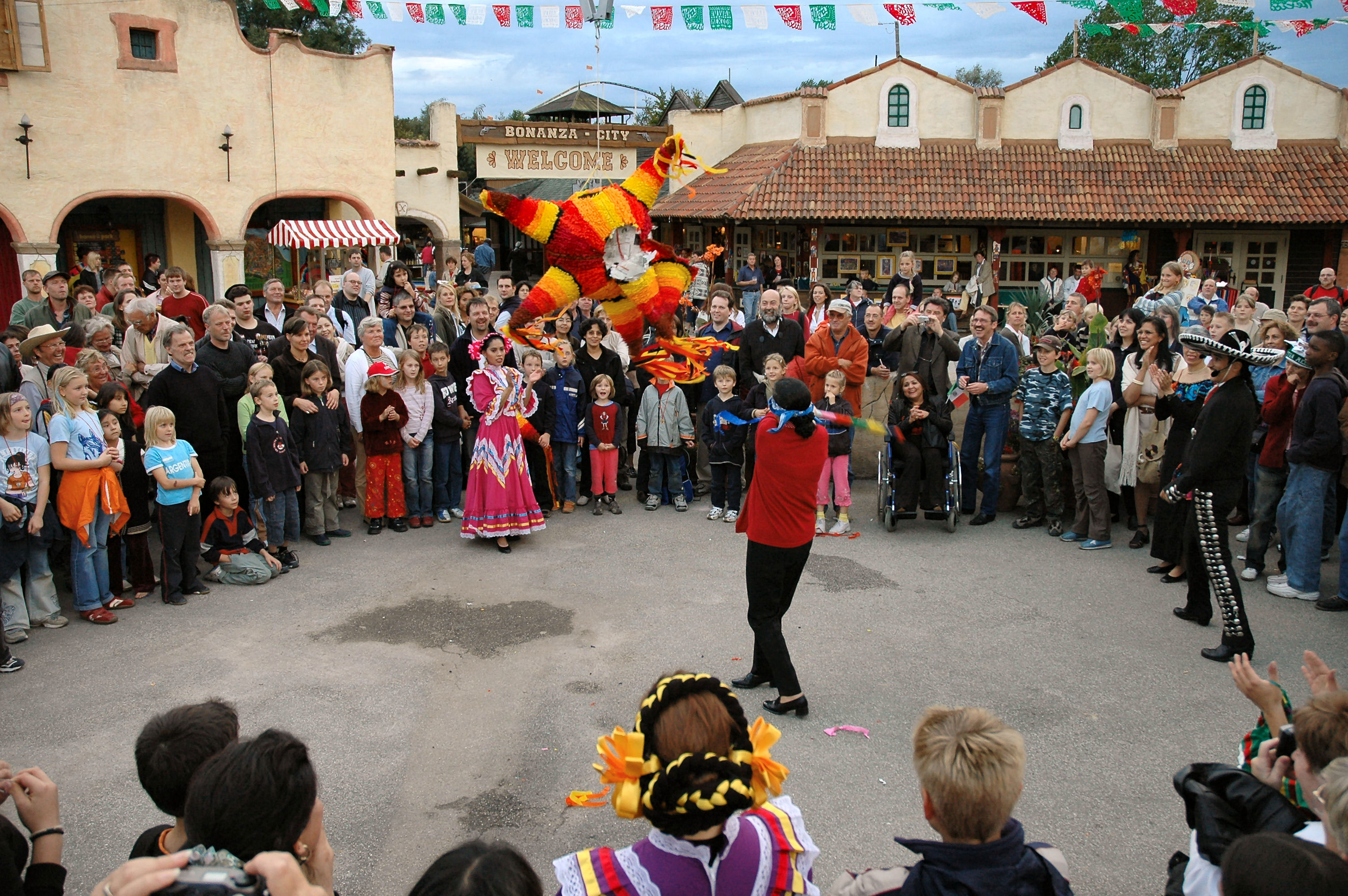
The Mexican diaspora is the world's second-largest; pictured is Mexican day celebrations in Germany.

A diaspora (/daɪˈæspərə/ dy-ASP-ər-ə) is a population dispersed across multiple regions outside its geographic place of origin, typically comprising people who continue to identify—culturally, politically, religiously, or emotionally—with a particular homeland while residing elsewhere. The term originates from the Ancient Greek word "διασπορά" (diaspora, lit. 'dispersion') and was first used this way in reference to the Jewish exile from Judea following the Babylonian captivity. The term now broadly encompasses communities formed through voluntary migration (such as trade, labor movement, or education) as well as through forced displacement caused by conquest, persecution, enslavement, famine, or war.

The concept of diaspora encompasses a wide range of communities, from longstanding groups such as Armenians, Africans dispersed through the Atlantic slave trade, and overseas Chinese, to more recent diasporas shaped by twentieth- and twenty-first-century conflict and upheaval, including Palestinians, Syrians, and Venezuelans. Contemporary definitions vary, but many emphasize geographic dispersion; enduring ties to a homeland; and social or cultural boundary-making that distinguishes the group within host societies, even as diasporas may also integrate deeply and develop complex transnational networks across multiple countries.

The oldest continuing diaspora population is generally considered the Jewish diaspora, originating in the first millennium BC; the oldest continuously inhabited diaspora community in one place is often identified as the Armenian Quarter of Jerusalem, established in the 4th century AD and expanded as a result of the Armenian genocide; and the largest diaspora today is the Indian diaspora, numbering 17.5 million worldwide as of 2019.

== Etymology ==
The term "diaspora" is derived from the Ancient Greek verb διασπείρω (diaspeirō), "I scatter", "I spread about" which in turn is composed of διά (dia), "between, through, across" and the verb σπείρω (speirō), "I sow, I scatter". The term διασπορά (diaspora) hence meant "scattering".

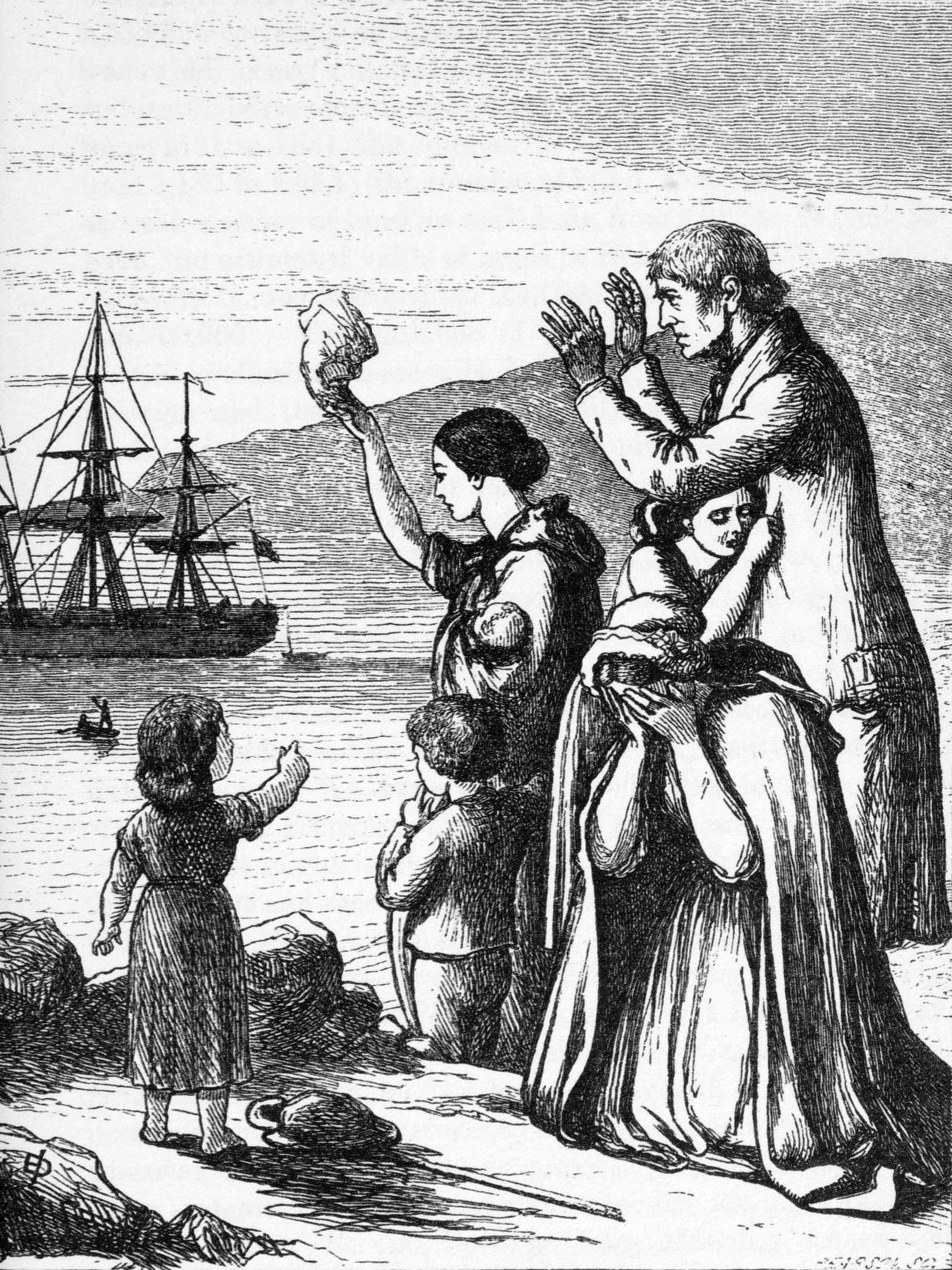
Emigrants Leave Ireland depicting the emigration from Ireland following the Great Famine

There is confusion over the exact process of derivation from these Ancient Greek verbs to the concept of diaspora. Many cite Thucydides (5th century BC) as the first to use the word. However, sociologist Stéphane Dufoix remarks "not only is the noun diaspora quite absent from the Greek original [Thucydides' Peloponnesian War, II, 27)], but the original does not include the verb diaspeírô either. The verb used is the verb speírô (seed) conjugated in the passive aorist." The passage in Thucydides reads:

καὶ οἱ μὲν αὐτῶν ἐνταῦθα ᾤκησαν, οἱ δ᾽ ἐσπάρησαν [esparēsan] κατὰ τὴν ἄλλην Ἑλλάδα, translated to mean 'Those of the Aeginetans who did not settle here were scattered over the rest of Hellas.'

Dufoix further notes, "Of all the occurrences of diaspora in the Thesaurus Linguae Graecae (TLG), which draws upon almost the entire written corpus in the Greek language . . . none refer to colonisation." Dufoix surmises that the confusion may stem from a comment by Jewish historian Simon Dubnow, who wrote an entry on diaspora for the influential Encyclopaedia of the Social Sciences. His entry, published in 1931, includes the following remark: "In a sense Magna Graecia constituted a Greek diaspora in the ancient Roman Empire." (Note: Dubnow's comment is referenced, for example, in an article by the editor of the journal Diaspora, Khachig Tölölyan. Tölölyan cites but does not actually quote Dubnow, claiming that Dubnow "stipulates that the Greek colony-cities of Antiquity might be called diasporas," whereas Dubnow clearly refers to the colonies as they stood "in the ancient Roman Empire," that is, after they had lost their political independence.) "Magna Graecia" refers to ancient Greek colonies established along the Italian coast, which lost their independence following the Second Punic War and their integration into the Roman Empire.

The first recorded use of the word "diaspora" is found in the Septuagint, first in:

- Deuteronomy 28:25, in the phrase ἔσῃ ἐν διασπορᾷ ἐν πάσαις ταῖς βασιλείαις τῆς γῆς, esē en diaspora en pasais tais basileiais tēs gēs, translated to mean 'thou shalt be a dispersion in all kingdoms of the earth'

and secondly in:

- Psalms 146(147).2, in the phrase οἰκοδομῶν Ἰερουσαλὴμ ὁ Kύριος καὶ τὰς διασπορὰς τοῦ Ἰσραὴλ ἐπισυνάξει, oikodomōn Ierousalēm ho Kyrios kai tas diasporas tou Israēl episynaxē, translated to mean 'The Lord doth build up Jerusalem: he gathereth together the outcasts of Israel'.

When the Bible was translated into Greek, the word diaspora was applied in reference to the Kingdom of Samaria which was exiled from Israel by the Assyrians between 740 and 722 BC, as well as Jews, Benjaminites, and Levites who were exiled from the Kingdom of Judah by the Babylonians in 587 BC, and Jews who were exiled from Roman Judea by the Roman Empire in 70 AD. It subsequently came to be used in reference to the historical movements and settlement patterns of the Jews. In English, capitalized, and without modifiers, the term can refer specifically to the Jewish diaspora. The wider application of diaspora evolved from the Assyrian two-way mass deportation policy of conquered populations to deny future territorial claims on their part.

=== Definition ===
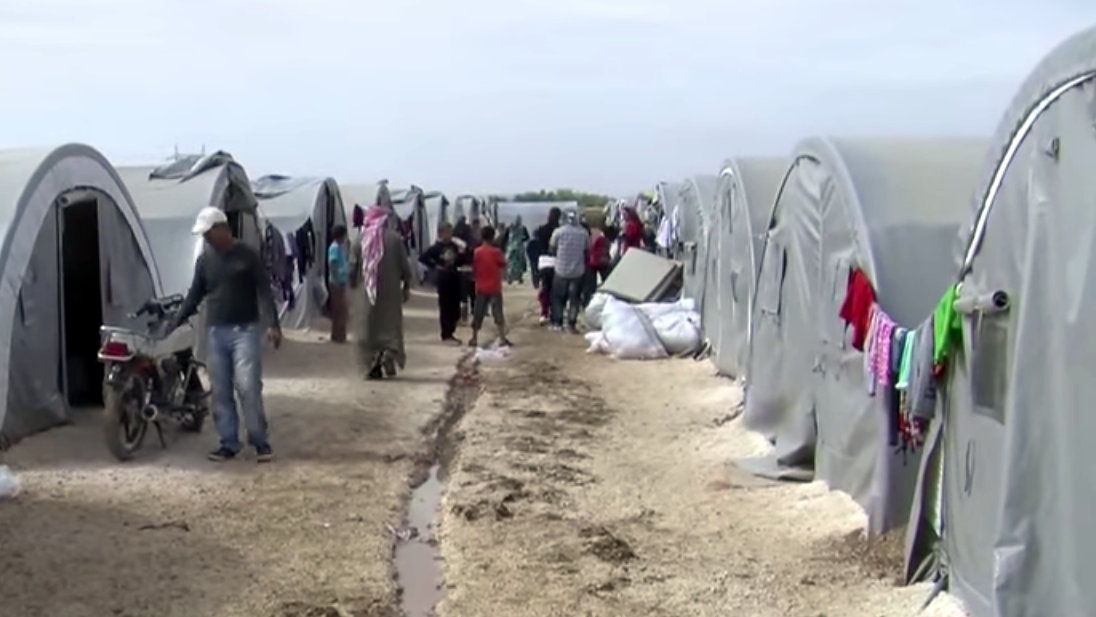
Kurdish refugees from Kobanî in a refugee camp, on the Turkish side of the Syria–Turkey border.

The oldest known use of the word "diaspora" in English is in 1594 in John Stockwood's translation of Lambert Daneau's commentary on the Twelve Prophets. Daneau writes:

This scattering abrode of the Iewes, as it were an heauenly sowing, fell out after their returne from the captiuitie of Babylon. Wherevpon both Acts. 2. and also 1. Pet. 1. and 1. Iam. ver. 1. [sic] they are called Diaspora, that is, a scattering or sowing abrode.

However, the current entry on "diaspora" in the Oxford English Dictionary Online dates the first recorded use a century later to 1694, in a work on ordination by the Welsh theologian James Owen. Owen wanted to prove that there is no difference in the Bible between Presbyters and Bishops; he cited the example of the Jews in exile:

The Presbyters of the Jewish Diaspora, to whom St. Peter wrote, are requir'd ποιμαίνειν ϗ̀ ἐπισκοπείν, to feed or rule the Flock, and to perform the office and work of Bishops among them.

The OED records a usage of "diaspora" in 1876, which refers to "extensive diaspora work (as it is termed) of evangelizing among the National Protestant Churches on the continent".

The term became more widely assimilated into English by the mid-1950s, with long-term expatriates in significant numbers from other particular countries or regions also being referred to as a diaspora. Such an understanding of the term was first introduced to the academic world in Simon Dubnow's entry titled 'Diaspora' in the 1931 Encyclopedia of the Social Sciences. Since then, an academic field, diaspora studies, has become established relating to this sense of the word. The field of diaspora studies grew rapidly: the use of the word 'diaspora' and cognate terms in dissertation abstracts rose from only once or twice a year in the 1970s to about 130 times by 2001. This field was institutionalized with the 1991 founding of the journal Diaspora: A Journal of Transnational Studies, edited by Khachig Tölölyan.

=== Scholarly work and expanding definition ===
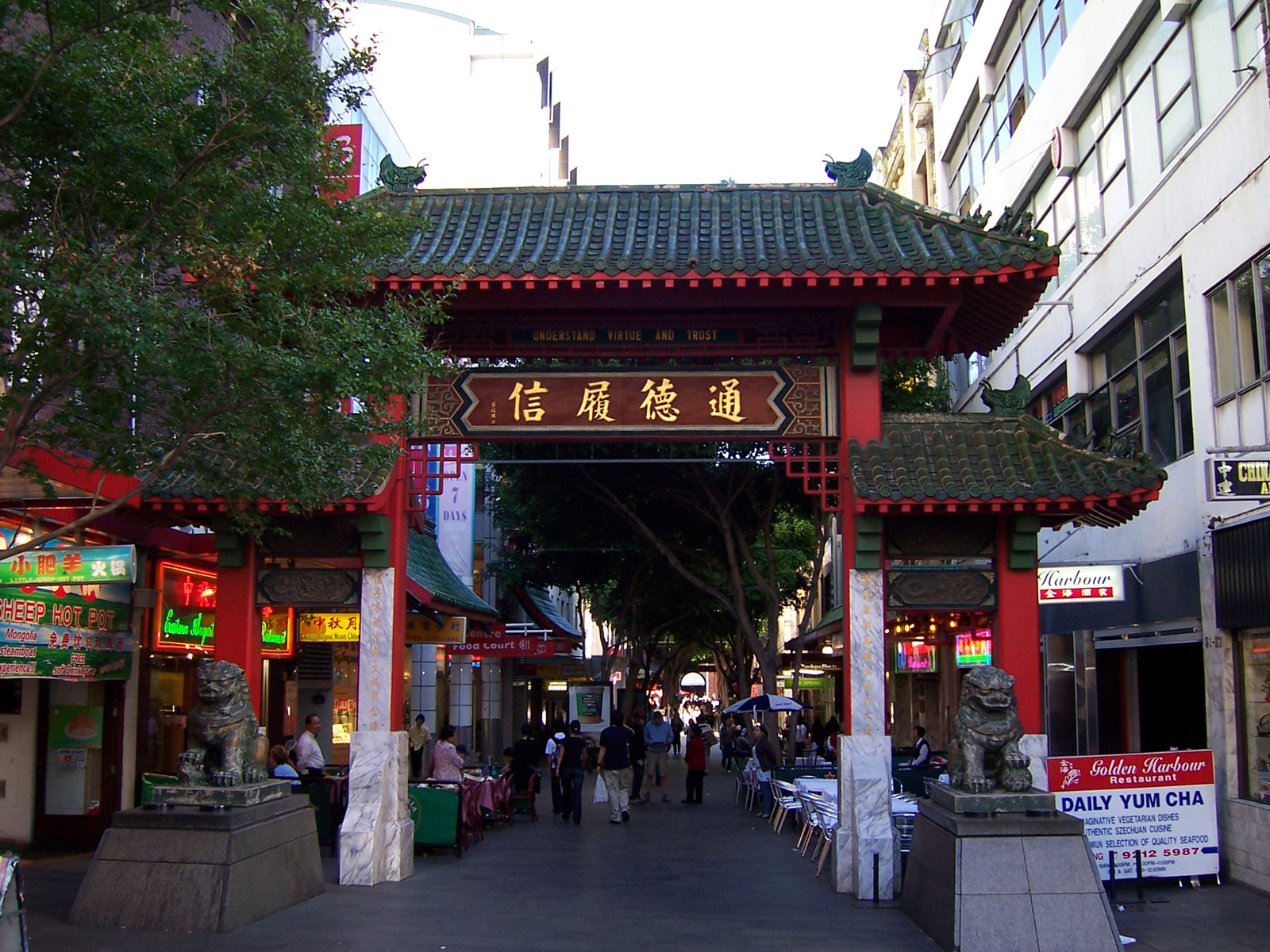
The Chinese diaspora is the world's third largest: Paifang (torana) gateway at Sydney Chinatown in Australia.

The anthropologist, Engseng Ho, credited the Zoryan Institute-funded journal Diaspora for having "popularized the term [diaspora] in academia."

William Safran, in an article published in 1991, set out six rules to distinguish diasporas from migrant communities. These included criteria that the group maintains a myth or collective memory of their homeland; that they regard their ancestral homeland as their true home, to which they will eventually return; that they are committed to the restoration or maintenance of that homeland, and that they relate "personally or vicariously" to the homeland to a point where it shapes their identity. Safran's definitions were influenced by the idea of the Jewish diaspora. Safran also included a criterion of having been forced into exile by political or economic factors, followed by a long period of settlement in the new host culture. In 1997, Robin Cohen argued that a diasporic group could leave its homeland voluntarily, and assimilate deeply into host cultures.

Rogers Brubaker (2005) more inclusively applied three basic definitional criteria: first, geographic dispersion (voluntary or forced) of a people; second, "the orientation to a real or imagined 'homeland' as an authoritative source of value, identity and loyalty"; and third, maintenance of a social boundary corresponding to the conservation of a distinctive diasporic identity which differs from the host culture. Brubaker also noted that the use of the term diaspora has been widening. He suggests that one element of this expansion in use "involves the application of the term diaspora to an ever-broadening set of cases: essentially to any and every nameable population category that is to some extent dispersed in space". Brubaker used the WorldCat database to show that 17 out of the 18 books on diaspora published between 1900 and 1910 were on the Jewish diaspora. The majority of works in the 1960s were also about the Jewish diaspora, but in 2002 only two out of 20 books sampled (out of a total of 253) were about the Jewish case, with a total of eight different diasporas covered.

Brubaker outlined the original use of the term diaspora as follows:

Most early discussions of the diaspora were firmly rooted in a conceptual 'homeland'; they were concerned with a paradigmatic case, or a small number of core cases. The paradigmatic case was, of course, the Jewish diaspora; some dictionary definitions of diaspora, until recently, did not simply illustrate but defined the word with reference to that case.

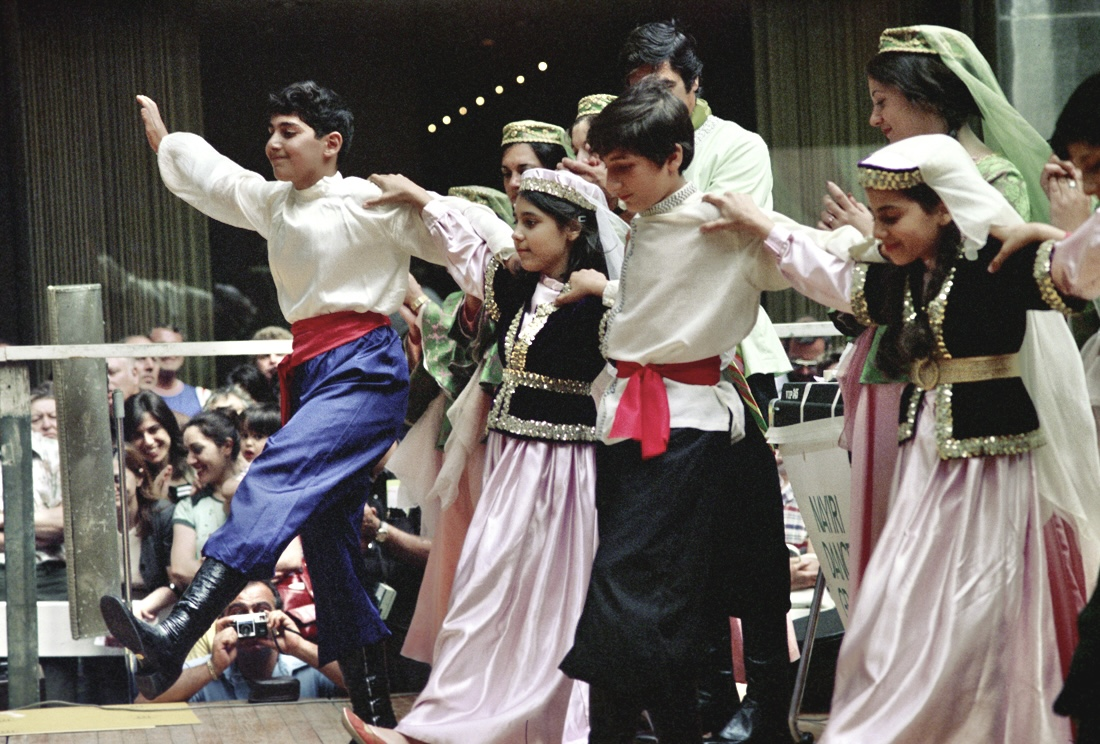
Armenian American dancers in New York City

Some observers have labeled evacuation from New Orleans and the Gulf Coast in the wake of Hurricane Katrina the New Orleans diaspora, since a significant number of evacuees have not been able to return, yet maintain aspirations to do so. Agnieszka Weinar (2010) notes the widening use of the term, arguing that recently, "a growing body of literature succeeded in reformulating the definition, framing diaspora as almost any population on the move and no longer referring to the specific context of their existence". It has even been noted that as charismatic Christianity becomes increasingly globalized, many Christians conceive of themselves as a diaspora, and form a bond that mimics salient features of some ethnic diasporas.

Professional communities of individuals no longer in their homeland can also be considered diaspora. For example, science diasporas are communities of scientists who conduct their research away from their homeland, and trading diasporas are communities of merchant aliens. In an article published in 1996, Khachig Tölölyan argues that the media have used the term corporate diaspora in a rather arbitrary and inaccurate fashion, for example as applied to "mid-level, mid-career executives who have been forced to find new places at a time of corporate upheaval". The use of corporate diaspora reflects the increasing popularity of the diaspora notion to describe a wide range of phenomena related to contemporary migration, displacement and transnational mobility. While corporate diaspora seems to avoid or contradict connotations of violence, coercion, and unnatural uprooting historically associated with the notion of diaspora, its scholarly use may heuristically describe the ways in which corporations function alongside diasporas. In this way, corporate diaspora might foreground the racial histories of diasporic formations without losing sight of the cultural logic of late capitalism in which corporations orchestrate the transnational circulation of people, images, ideologies and capital.

In contemporary times, scholars have classified the different kinds of diasporas based on their causes, such as colonialism, trade/labour migrations, or the social coherence which exists within the diaspora communities and their ties to the ancestral lands. With greater migration flows through the world in modern times, the concept of a secondary diaspora (a new diaspora branching out of a previous diaspora) or sub-diaspora groupings has started being studied. Some diaspora communities maintain strong cultural and political ties to their homelands. Other qualities that may be typical of many diasporas are thoughts of return to the ancestral lands, maintaining any form of ties with the region of origin as well as relationships with other communities in the diaspora, and lack of full integration into the new host countries. Diasporas often maintain ties to the country of their historical affiliation and usually influence their current host country's policies towards their homeland. "Diaspora management" is a term that Harris Mylonas has "re-conceptualized to describe both the policies that states follow in order to build links with their diaspora abroad and the policies designed to help with the incorporation and integration of diasporic communities when they 'return' home".

== Notable diaspora populations ==
Notable diasporic populations include the Jewish diaspora formed after the Babylonian exile; Romani from the Indian subcontinent; Assyrian diaspora following the Assyrian genocide; Greeks who fled or were displaced following the fall of Constantinople and the later Greek genocide as well as the Istanbul pogroms; Anglo-Saxons (primarily to the Byzantine Empire) after the Norman Conquest of England; the Chinese diaspora and Indian diaspora who left their homelands during the 19th and 20th centuries; the Irish diaspora after the Great Famine; the Scottish diaspora that developed on a large scale after the Highland and Lowland Clearances; the Italian diaspora, the Mexican diaspora; the Circassian diaspora in the aftermath of the Circassian genocide; the Armenian diaspora following the Armenian genocide; the Palestinian diaspora; the Lebanese diaspora due to the Famine of Mount Lebanon and, to a lesser extent, the Lebanese civil war; Syrians due to the Syrian civil war; and the Iranian diaspora which grew from half a million to 3.8 million between the 1979 revolution and 2019.

== African diasporas ==
Major slave trading regions of Africa, 15th–19th centuries

The diaspora of Africans during the Atlantic slave trade is one of the most notorious modern diasporas. 10.7 million people from West Africa survived transportation to arrive in the Americas as slaves starting in the late 16th century and continuing into the 19th century. Outside of the Atlantic slave trade, however, African diasporic communities have existed for millennia. While some communities were slave-based, other groups emigrated for various reasons.

From the 8th through the 19th centuries, the Arab slave trade dispersed millions of Africans to Asia and the islands of the Indian Ocean. The Islamic slave trade has also resulted in the creation of communities of African descent in India, most notably the Siddi, Makrani and Sri Lanka Kaffirs.

Beginning as early as the 2nd century, the kingdom of Aksum (modern-day Ethiopia) created colonies on the Arabian Peninsula. During the 4th century, Aksum formally adopted Christianity as a state religion, becoming the first to do so along with Armenia. In the 6th century, Kaleb of Axum invaded Himyar (modern-day Yemen) to aid and defend Christians under religious persecution. During these campaigns, several groups of soldiers chose not to return to Aksum. These groups are estimated to have ranged in size from the 600s to mid 3000s.

Previously, migrant Africans with national African passports could only enter 13 African countries without advanced visas. In pursuing a unified future, the African Union (AU) launched an African Union Passport in July 2016, allowing people with a passport from one of the 55 member states of the AU to move freely between these countries under this visa-free passport and encourage migrants with national African passports to return to Africa.

== Asian diasporas ==
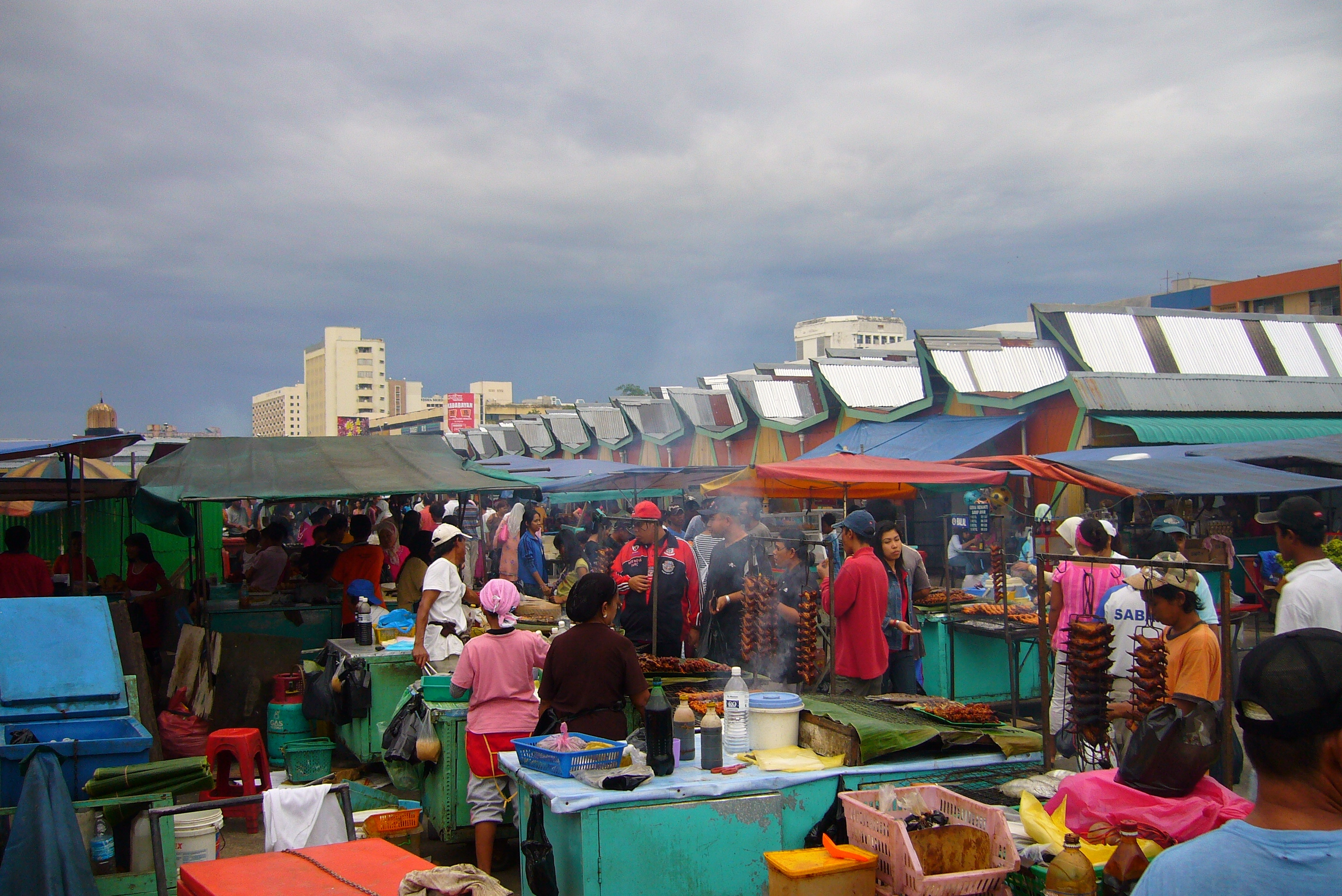
Filipino Market in Kota Kinabalu, Sabah, Malaysia.

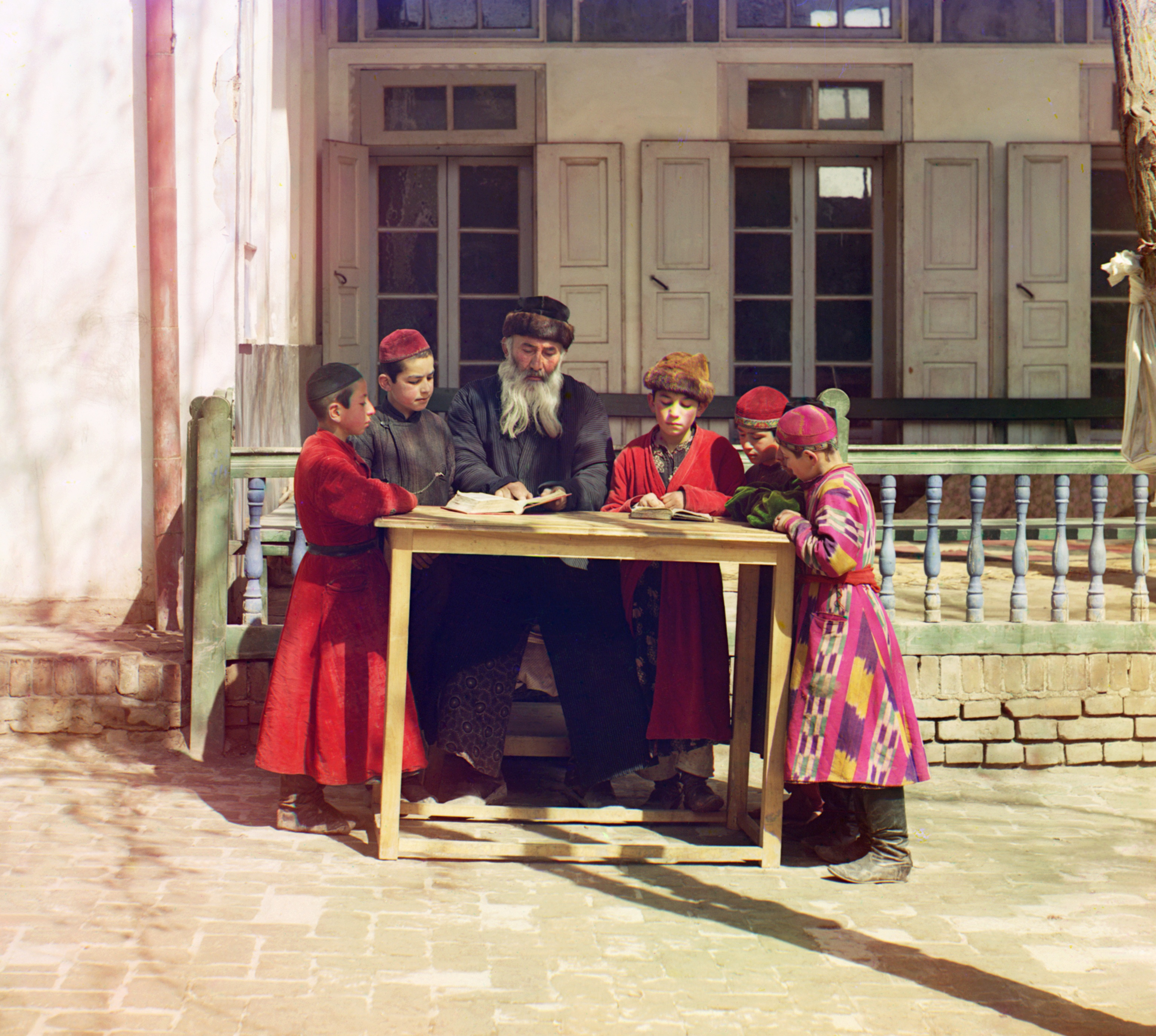
Bukharan Jews in Samarkand, present-day Uzbekistan, c. 1910

The largest Asian diaspora in the world is the Indian diaspora. The overseas Indian community, estimated to number over 17.5 million, is spread across many regions of the world, on every continent. It is a global community which is diverse, heterogeneous and eclectic and its members represent different regions, languages, cultures, and faiths (see Desi). Similarly, the Romani, numbering roughly 12 million in Europe trace their origins to the Indian subcontinent, and their presence in Europe is first attested to in the Middle Ages. The South Asian diaspora as a whole has over 44 million people.

One of earliest known Asian diaspora is the Jewish diaspora. With roots in the Babylonian Captivity and later migrations under Hellenism, the majority of the Jewish diaspora can be attributed to the Roman conquest, expulsion, and enslavement of the Jewish population of Judea, whose descendants became the Ashkenazim, Sephardim, and Mizrahim of today, roughly numbering 15 million of which 8 million still live in the diaspora, though the number was much higher before Zionist aliyah (immigration to Israel) and the murder of 6 million Jews in the Holocaust.

Another ancient diaspora is the Armenian diaspora, with origins that go back as far as 1,700 years ago. The Armenian diaspora is one of the oldest and largest diasporas in the world, with the oldest community being the Armenian Quarter of Jerusalem. Armenians were persecuted, forcefully displaced, and deported multiple times in their history during foreign rule. For over a thousand years, the Armenian people were continuously expelled from their homeland in a process which began with the Byzantines, continued with the Great Surgun under the Persian Empire, and culminated in the genocide of 1915 under the Ottoman Empire.

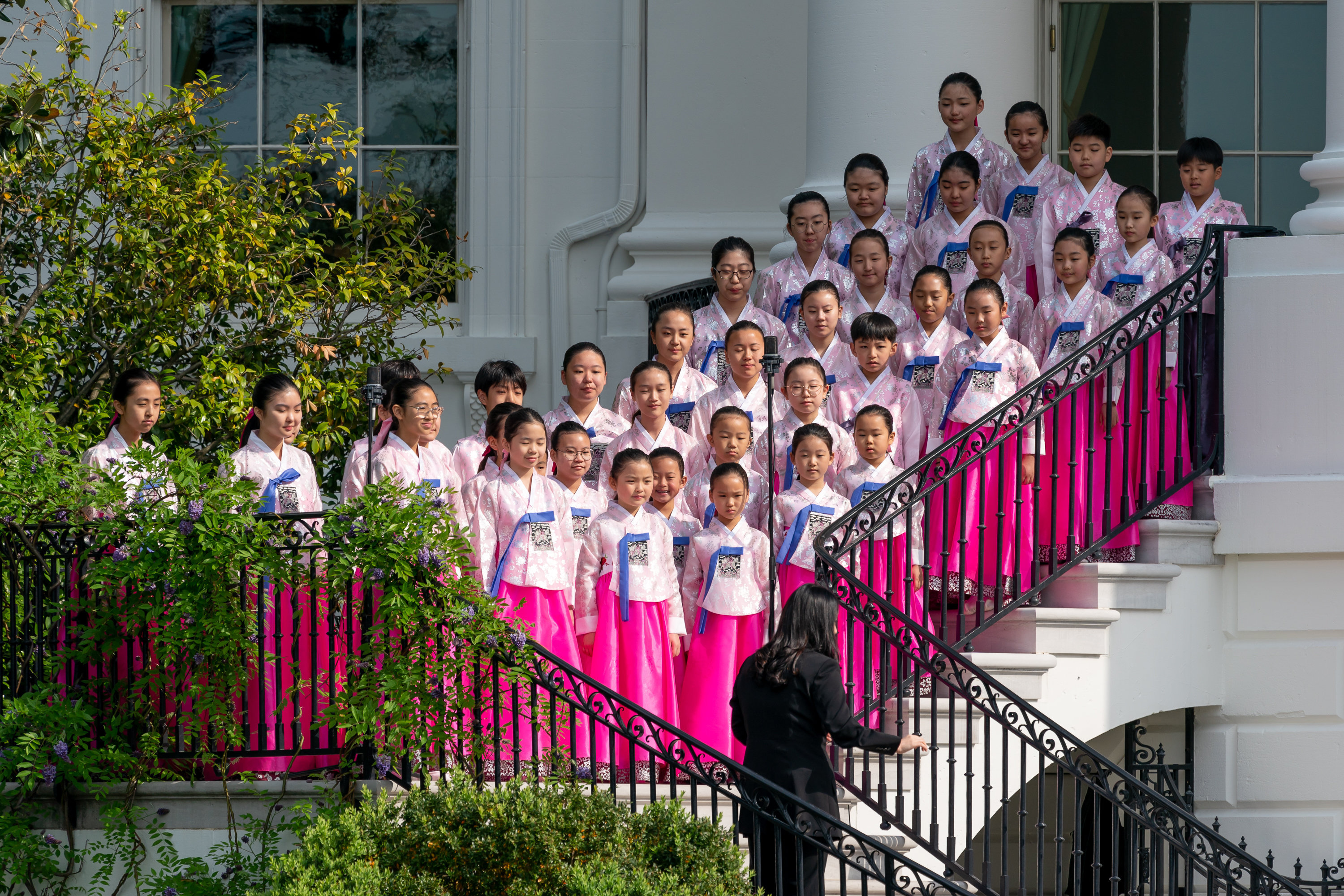
Korean-American Children’s Choir from the Korean School of New Jersey.

Chinese emigration (also known as the Chinese Diaspora; see also Overseas Chinese) first occurred thousands of years ago. The mass emigration that occurred from the 19th century to 1949 was caused mainly by wars and starvation in mainland China, as well as political corruption. Most migrants were illiterate or poorly educated peasants, called by the now-recognized racial slur coolies (Chinese: 苦力; lit. 'hard labour'), who migrated to developing countries in need of labor, such as the Americas, Australia, South Africa, Southeast Asia, Malaya and other places.

The Pakistani diaspora is the third largest diaspora in Asia with approximately 10 million Pakistanis living abroad mostly in Middle East, North America and Europe.

At least three waves of Nepalese diaspora can be identified. The earliest wave dates back hundreds of years as early marriage and high birthrates propelled Hindu settlement eastward across Nepal, then into Sikkim and Bhutan. A backlash developed in the 1980s as Bhutan's political elites realized that Bhutanese Buddhists were at risk of becoming a minority in their own country. At least 60,000 ethnic Nepalese from Bhutan have been resettled in the United States. A second wave was driven by British recruitment of mercenary soldiers beginning around 1815 and resettlement after retirement in the British Isles and Southeast Asia. The third wave began in the 1970s as land shortages intensified and the pool of educated labor greatly exceeded job openings in Nepal. Job-related emigration created Nepalese enclaves in India, the wealthier countries of the Middle East, Europe, and North America. Current estimates of the number of Nepalese living outside Nepal range well up into the millions.

In Siam, regional power struggles among several kingdoms in the region led to a large diaspora of ethnic Lao between the 1700s–1800s by Siamese rulers to settle large areas of the Siamese kingdom's northeast region, where Lao ethnicity is still a major factor in 2012. During this period, Siam decimated the Lao capital, capturing, torturing, and killing the Lao king Anuwongse, who led the Lao rebellion in the 19th century.

== European diasporas ==
European history contains numerous diaspora-causing events. In ancient times, the trading and colonising activities of the Greek tribes from the Balkans and Asia Minor spread people of Greek culture, religion and language around the Mediterranean and Black Sea basins, establishing Greek city-states in southern Italy (the so-called "Magna Graecia"), northern Libya, eastern Spain, the south of France, and the Black Sea coasts. Greeks founded more than 400 colonies. Tyre and Carthage also colonised the Mediterranean.

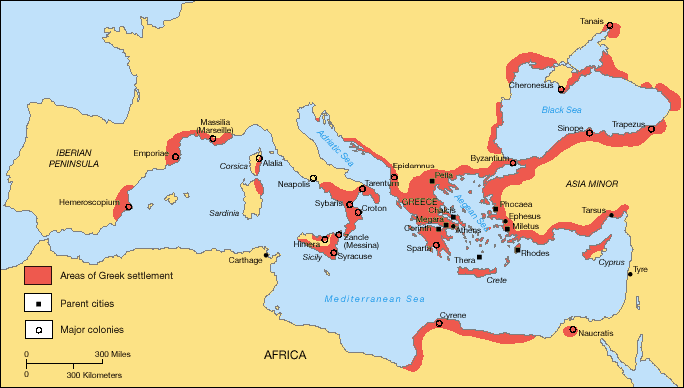
Greek territories and colonies during the Archaic period (750–550 BC)

Alexander the Great's conquest of the Achaemenid Empire marked the beginning of the Hellenistic period, characterized by a new wave of Greek colonization in Asia and Africa, with Greek ruling classes established in Egypt, southwest Asia and northwest India. Subsequent waves of colonization and migration during the Middle Ages added to the older settlements or created new ones, thus replenishing the Greek diaspora and making it one of the most long-standing and widespread in the world. The Romans also established numerous colonies and settlements outside of Rome and throughout the Roman empire.

The Migration Period relocations, which included several phases, are just one set of many in history. The first phase Migration-Period displacement (between 300 and 500 AD) included relocation of the Goths (Ostrogoths and Visigoths), Vandals, Franks, various other Germanic peoples (Burgundians, Lombards, Angles, Saxons, Jutes, Suebi and Alemanni), Alans and numerous Slavic tribes. The second phase, between 500 and 900 AD, saw Slavic, Turkic, and other tribes on the move, resettling in Eastern Europe and gradually leaving it predominantly Slavic, and affecting Anatolia and the Caucasus as the first Turkic tribes (Avars, Huns, Khazars, Pechenegs), as well as Bulgars, and possibly Magyars arrived. The last phase of the migrations saw the coming of the Hungarian Magyars. The Viking expansion out of Scandinavia into southern and eastern Europe, Iceland, the British Isles and Greenland. The recent application of the word "diaspora" to the Viking lexicon highlights their cultural profile distinct from their predatory reputation in the regions they settled, especially in the North Atlantic. The more positive connotations associated with the social science term help to view the movement of the Scandinavian peoples in the Viking Age in a new way.

Such colonizing migrations cannot be considered indefinitely as diasporas; over very long periods, eventually, the migrants assimilate into the settled area so completely that it becomes their new mental homeland. Thus the modern Magyars of Hungary do not feel that they belong in the Western Siberia that the Hungarian Magyars left 12 centuries ago; and the English descendants of the Angles, Saxons and Jutes do not yearn to reoccupy the plains of Northwest Germany.

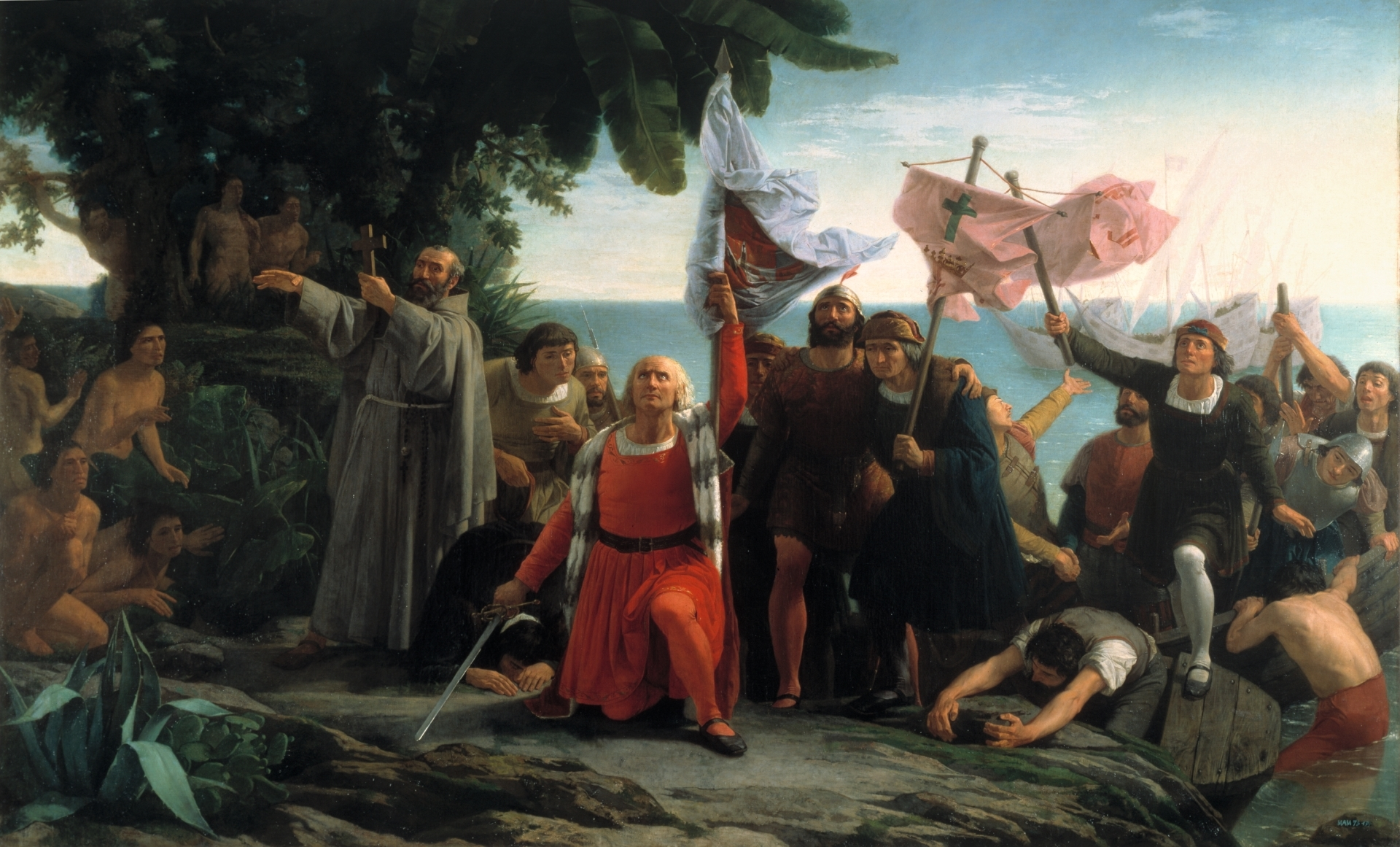
The Italian explorer Christopher Columbus leads an expedition to the New World, 1492. His voyages are celebrated as the discovery of the Americas from a European perspective, and they opened a new era in the history of humankind and sustained contact between the two worlds.

In 1492 a Spanish-financed expedition headed by Christopher Columbus arrived in the Americas, after which European exploration and colonization rapidly expanded. Historian James Axtell estimates that 240,000 people left Europe for the Americas in the 16th century. Emigration continued. In the 19th century alone over 50 million Europeans migrated to North and South America. Other Europeans moved to Siberia, Africa, and Australasia. The properly Spanish emigrants were mainly from several parts of Spain, but not only the impoverished ones (i.e., Basques in Chile), and the destination varied also along the time. As an example, the Galicians moved first to the American colonies during the XVII-XX (mainly but not only Mexico, Cuba, Argentine and Venezuela, as many writers during the Francoist exile), later to Europe (France, Switzerland) and finally within Spain (to Madrid, Catalonia or the Basque Country).

A specific 19th-century example is the Irish diaspora, beginning in the mid-19th century and brought about by an Gorta Mór or "the Great Hunger" of the Irish Famine. An estimated 45% to 85% of Ireland's population emigrated to areas including Britain, the United States, Canada, Argentina, Australia, and New Zealand. The size of the Irish diaspora is demonstrated by the number of people around the world who claim Irish ancestry; some sources put the figure at 80 to 100 million.

From the 1860s, the Circassian people, originally from Europe, were dispersed through Anatolia, Australia, the Balkans, the Levant, North America, and West Europe, leaving less than 10% of their population in the homeland – parts of historical Circassia (in the modern-day Russian portion of the Caucasus).

The Scottish Diaspora includes large populations of Highlanders moving to the United States and Canada after the Highland Clearances; as well as the Lowlanders, becoming the Ulster Scots in Ireland and the Scotch-Irish in America.

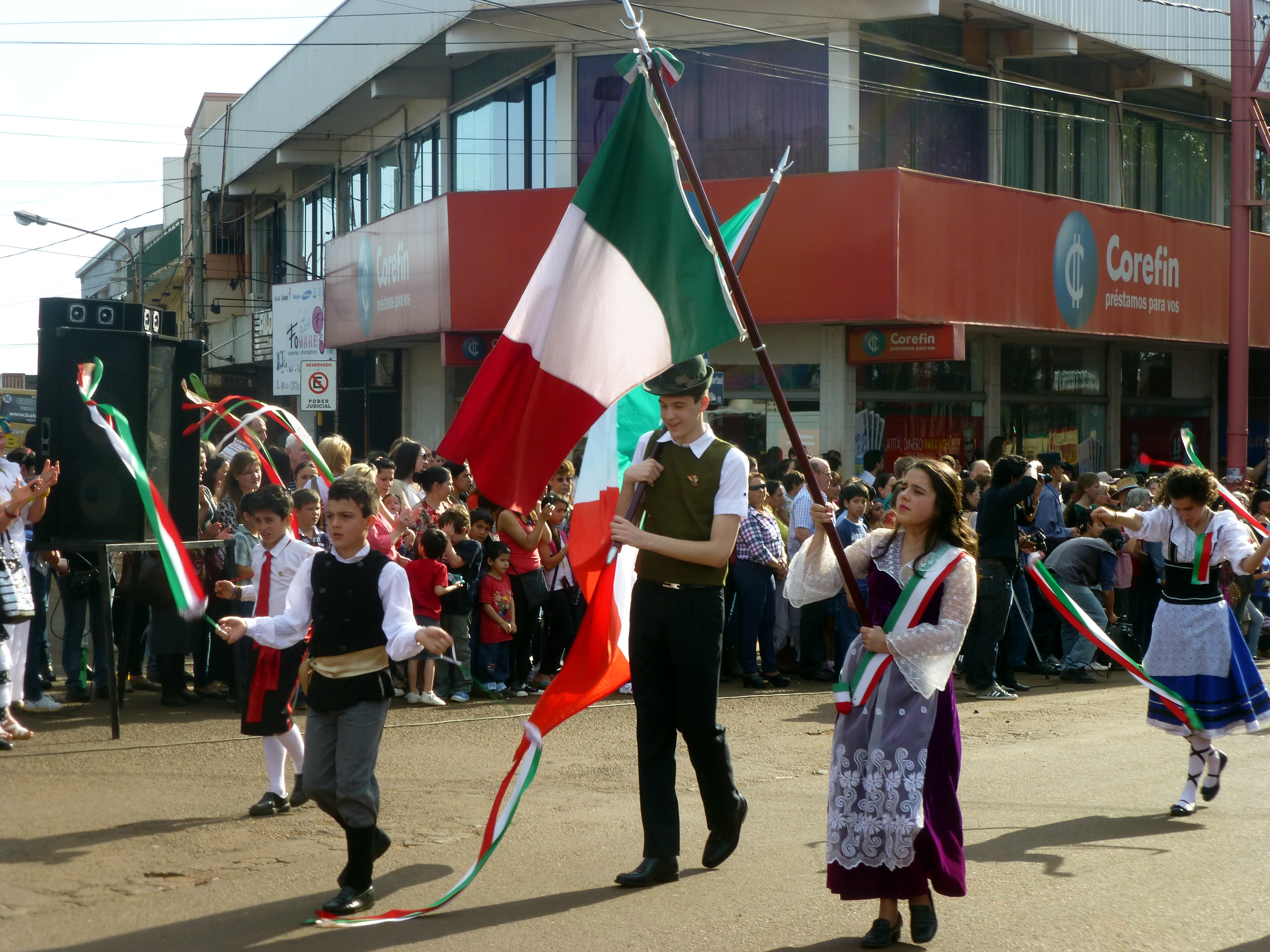
Italian Argentines during the opening parade of the XXXIV Immigrant's Festival. About 60% of Argentina's population has Italian ancestry.

There were two major Italian diasporas in Italian history. The first diaspora began around 1880, two decades after the Unification of Italy, and ended in the 1920s, with the rise of Fascist Italy. Poverty was the main reason for emigration, specifically the lack of land as mezzadria sharecropping flourished in Italy, especially in the South, and property became subdivided over generations. Until the 1860s (and, in Mountainous areas and Southern Italy, well into the 1950s), most of Italy was a rural society, with many small towns and cities. In Southern Italy, emigration was aggravated by land ownership concentration and management practices discouraging class solidarity. Another factor was related to overpopulation as a result of the improvements in socioeconomic conditions after Unification. That created a demographic boom and forced the new generations to emigrate en masse in the late 19th century and the early 20th century, mostly to the Americas. The new migration of capital created millions of unskilled jobs around the world and was responsible for the simultaneous mass migration of Italians searching for "work and bread". The second diaspora started after the end of World War II and concluded roughly in the 1970s. Between 1880 and 1980, about 15,000,000 Italians left the country permanently. By 1980, it was estimated that about 25,000,000 Italians were residing outside Italy.

== Internal diasporas ==
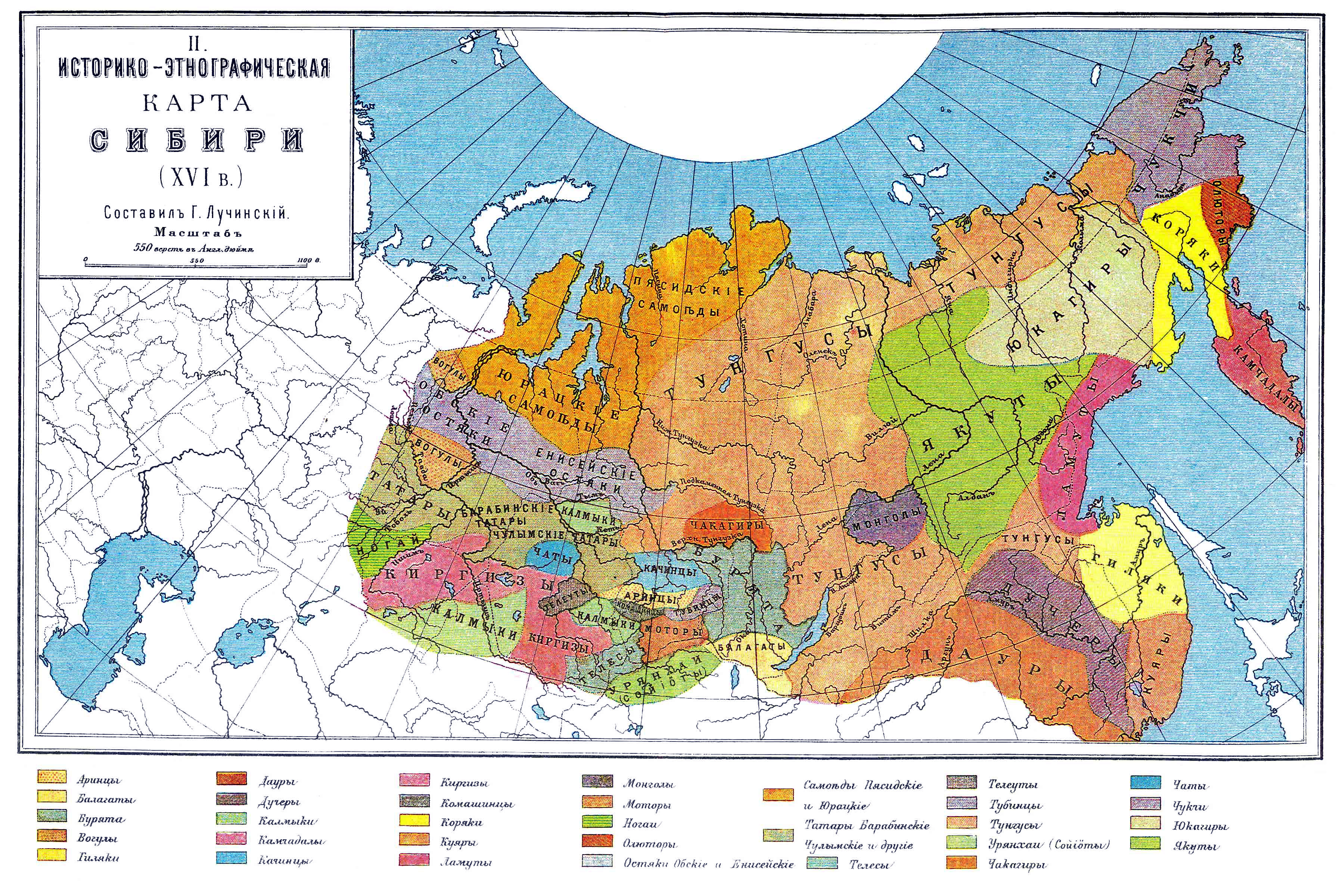
An ethnographic map of 16th-century Siberia, made in the Russian Empire period, between 1890 and 1907

In the United States of America, approximately 4.3 million people moved outside their home states in 2010, according to IRS tax-exemption data. In a 2011 TEDx presentation, Detroit native Garlin Gilchrist referenced the formation of distinct "Detroit diaspora" communities in Seattle and in Washington, DC, while layoffs in the auto industry also led to substantial blue-collar migration from Michigan to Wyoming c. 2005. In response to a statewide exodus of talent, the State of Michigan continues to host "MichAGAIN" career-recruiting events in places throughout the United States with significant Michigan-diaspora populations.

In the People's Republic of China, millions of migrant workers have sought greater opportunity in the country's booming coastal metropolises, though this trend has slowed with the further development of China's interior. Migrant social structures in Chinese megacities are often based on place of origin, such as a shared hometown or province, and recruiters and foremen commonly select entire work-crews from the same village. In two separate June 2011 incidents, Sichuanese migrant workers organized violent protests against alleged police misconduct and migrant-labor abuse near the southern manufacturing hub of Guangzhou.

Much of Siberia's population has its origins in internal migration – voluntary or otherwise – from European Russia since the 16th century. The vast majority of the Siberian population (over 85%) is Slavic and other Indo-European ethnicities, mainly the Russians (including their subethnic group Siberians), Ukrainians, and Germans. Most non-Slavic groups are Turkic. Smaller linguistic groups include Mongolic (ca. 600,000 speakers), Uralic (Samoyedic, Ugric; roughly 100,000 speakers), Manchu-Tungus (ca. 40,000 speakers), Chukotko-Kamchatkan (ca. 25,000 speakers), Eskimo–Aleut (some 2,000 speakers), Yukaghir (highly endangered), and languages isolates Ket (but see below) and Nivkh.

=== Canada ===
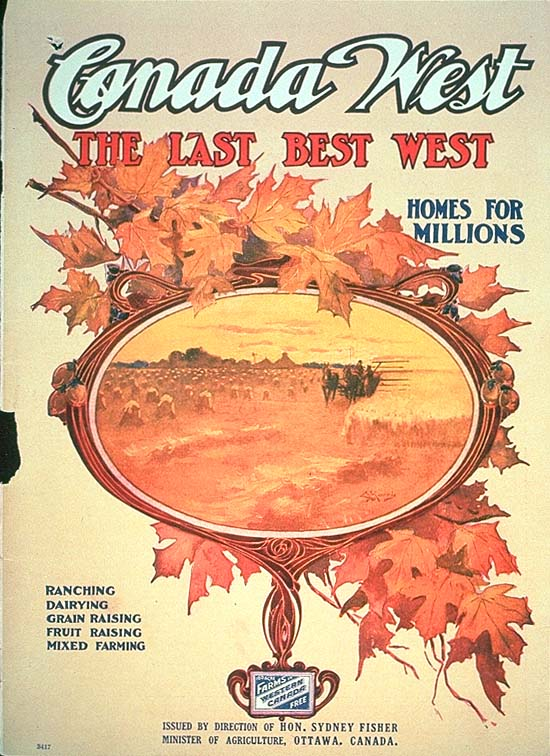
Pamphlet advertising for immigration to Western Canada, c. 1910

In Canada, internal migration has occurred for a number of different factors over the course of Canadian history. An example is the migration of workers from Atlantic Canada (particularly Newfoundland and Labrador) to Alberta, driven in part by the cod collapse in the early 1990s and the 1992 moratorium on cod fishing. Fishing had previously been a major driver of the economies of the Atlantic provinces, and this loss of work proved catastrophic for many families. As a result, beginning in the early 1990s and into the late 2000s, thousands of people from the Atlantic provinces were driven out-of-province to find work elsewhere in the country, especially in the Alberta oil sands during the oil boom of the mid-2000s. This systemic export of labour is explored by author Kate Beaton in her 2022 graphic memoir Ducks, which details her experience working in the Athabasca oil sands.

=== Brazil ===
Internal migration in Brazil occurs mainly for economic reasons and ecological disasters. Internal migration involves the movement of people within the same territory, which can be between regions, states or municipalities. It does not affect the total number of inhabitants in a country, but it does change the regions involved in this process. In Brazil, economic factors exert the greatest influence on migratory flows, as the capitalist production model creates privileged areas for industries, forcing people to move from one place to another in search of better living conditions and jobs to meet their basic survival needs.

Some examples of internal migration in Brazil occurred in the 1960s, when the droughts devastated the Northeast of Brazil, leading thousands of people to abandon their homes in the Brazilian hinterland due to the lack of agricultural alternatives and social policies in the region. At the end of the 19th century, northeasterners migrated to the North of Brazil because of the rubber cycle. In the 1970s, migrants from the Northeast and the South left in search of a better life in the Southeast, Brazil's only industrial center at the time.

=== Italy ===
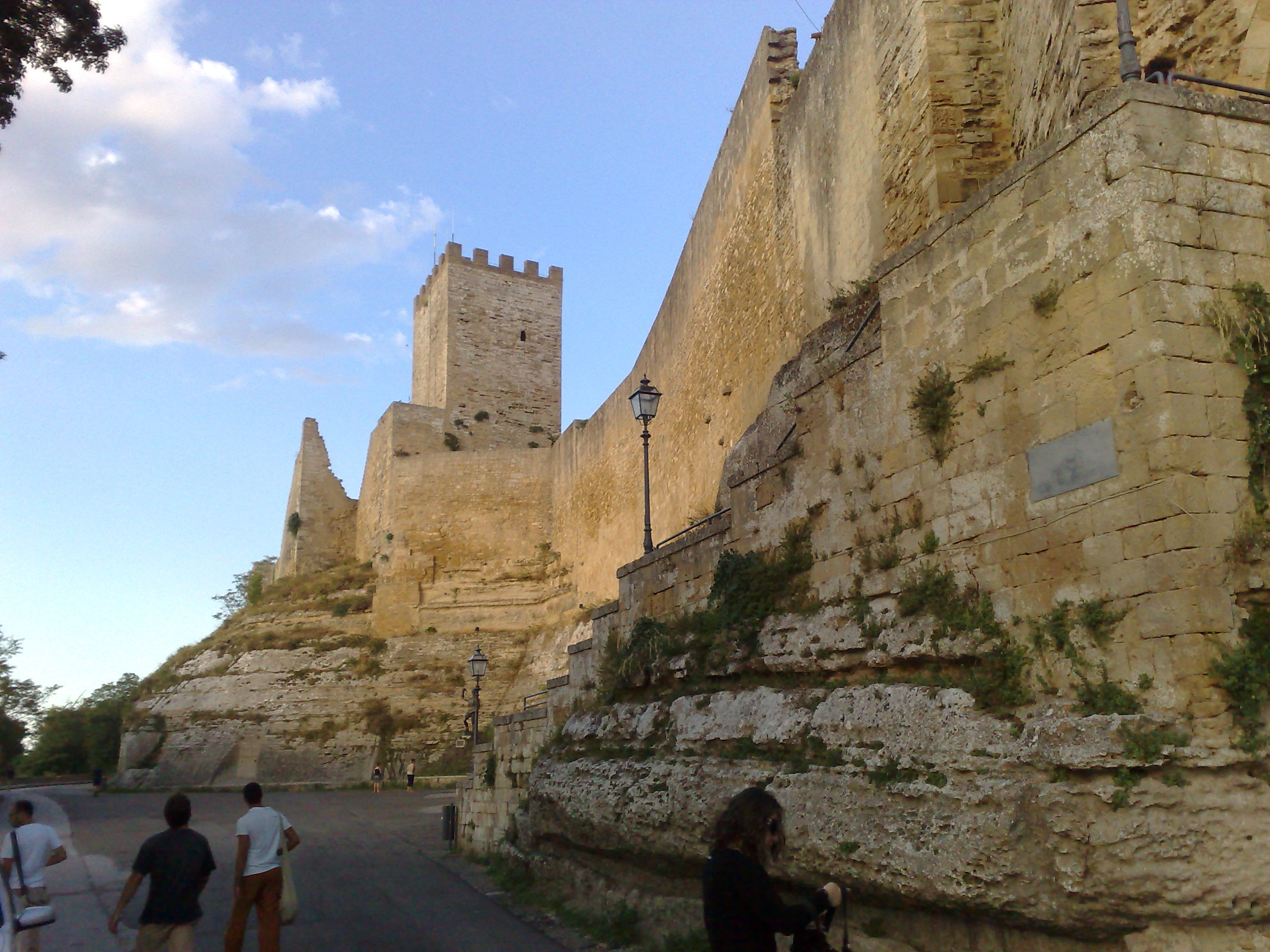
Castello di Lombardia, Enna, Sicily

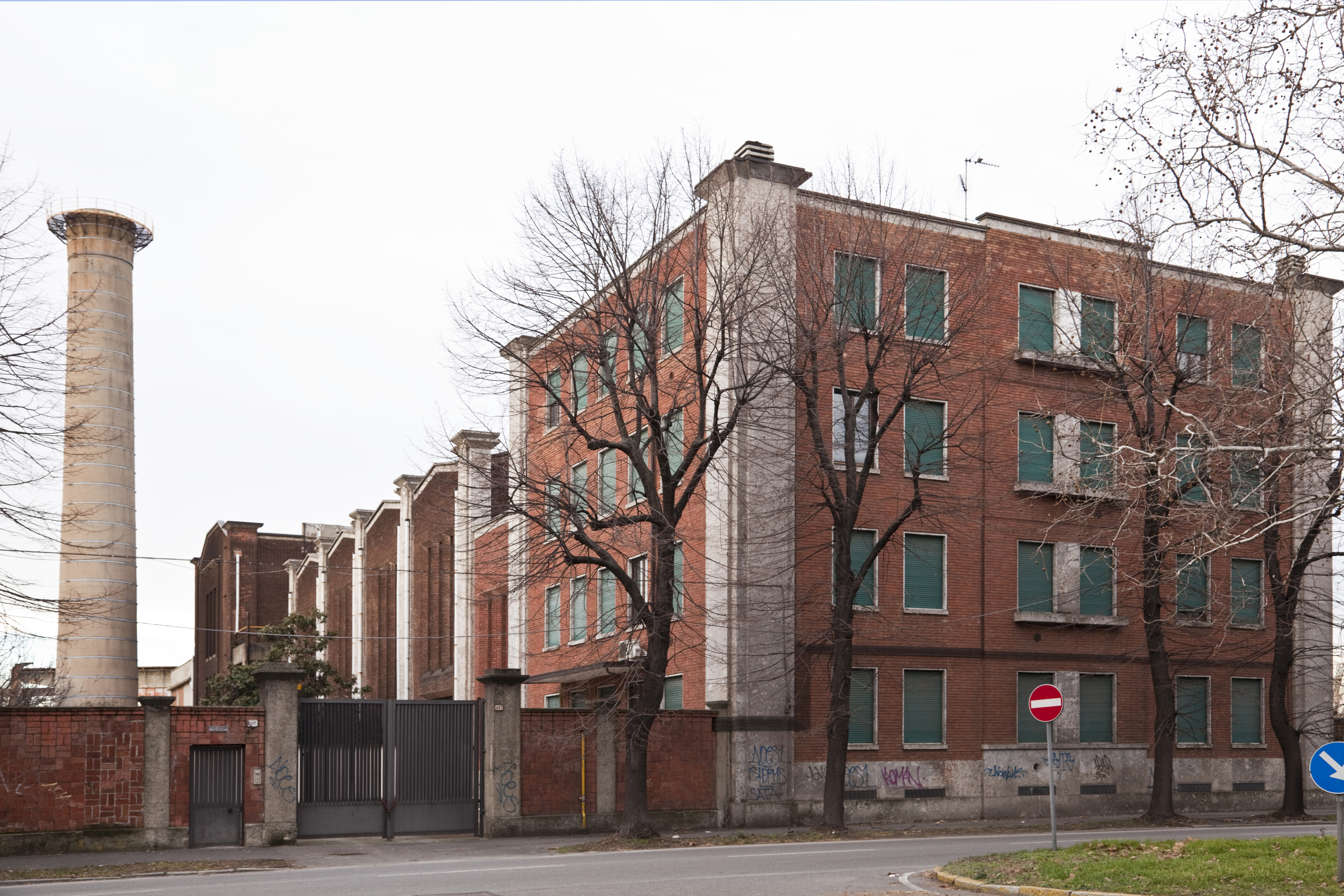
View of the Falck steelworks in Sesto San Giovanni, in Lombardy, Italy

The oldest internal migration in Italy goes back to the 11th century when soldiers and settlers from Northern Italy (at the time collectively called "Lombardy"), settled the central and eastern part of Sicily during the Norman conquest of southern Italy. After the marriage between the Norman king Roger I of Sicily with Adelaide del Vasto, member of Aleramici family, many Lombard colonisers left their homeland, in the Aleramici's possessions in Piedmont and Liguria, to settle on the island of Sicily. The migration of people from Northern Italy to Sicily continued until the end of the 13th century. In the same period people from Northern Italy also emigrated to Basilicata. It is believed that the population of Northern Italy who immigrated to Sicily during these centuries was altogether about 200,000 people. Their descendants, who are still present in Sicily today, are called Lombards of Sicily. Following these ancient migrations, in some municipalities of Sicily and Basilicata, dialects of northern origin are still spoken today, the Gallo-Italic of Sicily and the Gallo-Italic of Basilicata.

With the fall of Fascist regime in 1943, and the end of World War II in 1945, a large internal migratory flow began from one Italian region to another. This internal emigration was sustained and constantly increased by the economic growth that Italy experienced between the 1950s and 1960s. Given that this economic growth mostly concerned Northwest Italy, which was involved in the birth of many industrial activities, migratory phenomena affected the peasants of the Triveneto and southern Italy, who began to move in large numbers. Other areas of northern Italy were also affected by emigration such as the rural areas of Mantua and Cremona. The destinations of these emigrants were mainly Milan, Turin, Varese, Como, Lecco, and Brianza. The rural population of the aforementioned areas began to emigrate to the large industrial centers of the north-west, especially in the so-called "industrial triangle, or the area corresponding to the three-sided polygon with vertices in the cities of Turin, Milan and Genoa. Even some cities in central and southern Italy (such as Rome, which was the object of immigration due to employment in the administrative and tertiary sectors) experienced a conspicuous immigration flow.

These migratory movements were accompanied by other flows of lesser intensity, such as transfers from the countryside to smaller cities and travel from mountainous areas to the plains. The main reasons that gave rise to this massive migratory flow were linked to the living conditions in the places of origin of the emigrants (which were very harsh), the absence of stable work, the high rate of poverty, the poor fertility of many agricultural areas, the fragmentation of land properties, which characterized southern Italy above all, and the insecurity caused by organized crime. Overall, the Italians who moved from southern to northern Italy amounted to 4 million. The migratory flow from the countryside to the big cities also contracted and then stopped in the 1980s. At the same time, migratory movements towards medium-sized cities and those destined for small-sized villages increased.

== 20th century ==
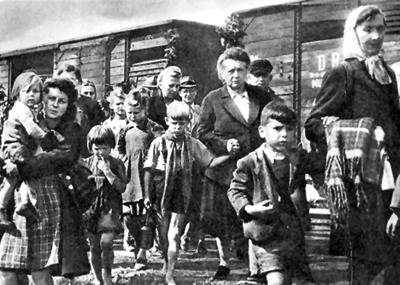
Expulsion of Germans from Czechoslovakia following the end of World War II

The 20th century saw huge population movements. Some involved large-scale transfers of people by government action. Some migrations occurred to avoid conflict and warfare. Other diasporas formed as a consequence of political developments, such as the end of colonialism.

=== World War II, colonialism, and post-colonialism ===
As World War II (1939–1945) unfolded, Nazi German authorities deported and killed millions of Jews; they also enslaved or murdered millions of other people, including Romani, Ukrainians, Russians, and other Slavs. Some Jews fled from the persecution and moved to the unoccupied parts of Western Europe or they moved to the Americas before the borders of the Americas were closed. Later, other Eastern European refugees moved west, away from Soviet expansion and from the Iron Curtain regimes established as World War II ended. Hundreds of thousands of these anti-Soviet political refugees and displaced persons ended up in western Europe, Australia, Canada, and the United States of America.

After World War II, the Soviet Union and communist-controlled Poland, Czechoslovakia, Hungary and Yugoslavia expelled millions of ethnic Germans, most of them were the descendants of immigrants who had settled in those areas centuries ago. This expulsion was allegedly carried out in reaction to Nazi Germany's invasions and pan-German attempts to annex Eastern European territory. Most of the refugees moved to the West, including western Europe, and with tens of thousands seeking refuge in the United States.

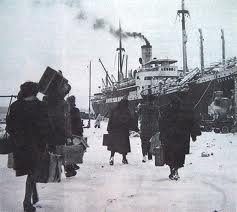
Istrian Italians leave Pola in 1947 during the Istrian-Dalmatian exodus

The Istrian–Dalmatian exodus was the post-World War II exodus and departure of local ethnic Italians (Istrian Italians and Dalmatian Italians) as well as ethnic Slovenes, Croats, and Istro-Romanians from the Yugoslav territory of Istria, Kvarner, the Julian March as well as Dalmatia, towards Italy, and in smaller numbers, towards the Americas, Australia, and South Africa. These regions were ethnically mixed, with long-established historic Croatian, Italian, and Slovene communities. According to various sources, the exodus is estimated to have amounted to between 230,000 and 350,000 Italians (the others being ethnic Slovenes, Croats, and Istro-Romanians, who chose to maintain Italian citizenship) leaving the areas in the aftermath of the conflict. Hundreds or perhaps tens of thousands of local ethnic Italians (Istrian Italians and Dalmatian Italians) were killed or summarily executed during World War II by Yugoslav Partisans and OZNA during the first years of the exodus, in what became known as the foibe massacres. From 1947, after the war, Istrian Italians and Dalmatian Italians were subject by Yugoslav authorities to less violent forms of intimidation, such as nationalization, expropriation, and discriminatory taxation, which gave them little option other than emigration. In 1953, there were 36,000 declared Italians in Yugoslavia, just about 16% of the original Italian population before World War II. According to the census organized in Croatia in 2001 and that organized in Slovenia in 2002, the Italians who remained in the former Yugoslavia amounted to 21,894 people (2,258 in Slovenia and 19,636 in Croatia).

Spain sent many political activists into exile during the rule of Franco's military regime from 1936 until his death in 1975.

Prior to World War II and the re-establishment of Israel in 1948, a series of anti-Jewish pogroms broke out in the Arab world and caused many to flee, mostly to Palestine/Israel. The 1947–1949 Palestine war likewise saw at least 750,000 Palestinians expelled or forced to flee from the newly forming Israel. Many Palestinians continue to live in refugee camps in the Middle East, while others have resettled in other countries.

The 1947 Partition in the Indian subcontinent resulted in the migration of millions of people between India, Pakistan, and present-day Bangladesh. Many were murdered in the religious violence of the period, with estimates of fatalities up to 2 million people. Thousands of former subjects of the British Raj went to the UK from the Indian subcontinent after India and Pakistan became independent in 1947.

From the late 19th century, and formally from 1910, Japan made Korea a Japanese colony. Millions of Chinese fled to western provinces not occupied by Japan (that is, in particular, Sichuan and Yunnan in the Southwest and Shaanxi and Gansu in the Northwest) and to Southeast Asia. More than 100,000 Koreans moved across the Amur River into the Russian Far East (and later into the Soviet Union) away from the Japanese.

=== The Cold War and the formation of post-colonial states ===
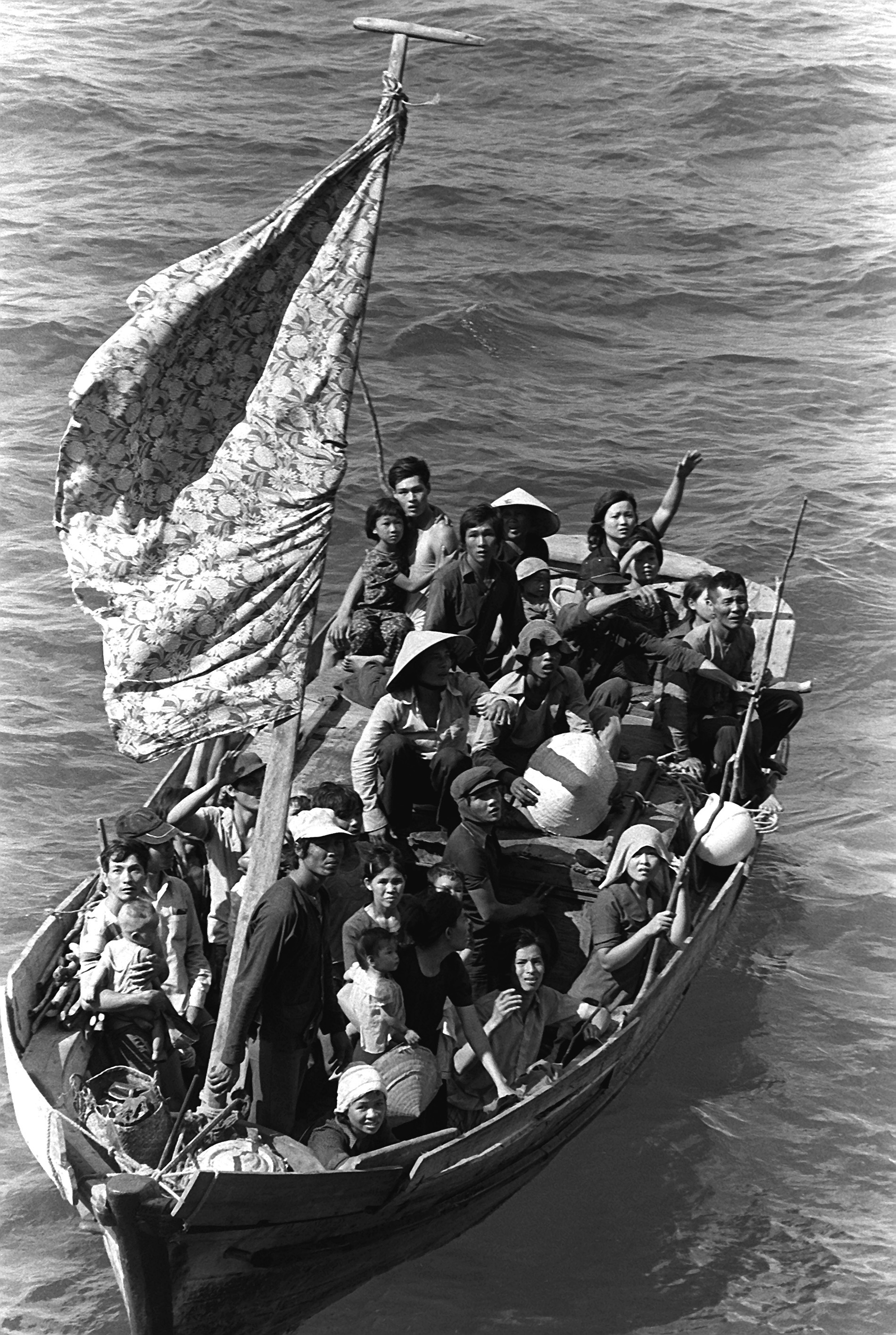
Vietnamese "boat people" awaiting rescue.

Both during and after the Cold War-era, huge populations of refugees migrated from countries which experienced conflicts, especially from then-developing countries. Upheavals in the Middle East and Central Asia, some of which were related to power struggles between the United States and the Soviet Union, produced new refugee populations that developed into global diasporas.

- In Southeast Asia, many Vietnamese people emigrated to France and later millions of other Vietnamese people migrated to the United States, Australia and Canada after the Cold War-related Vietnam War of 1955–1975. Later, 30,000 French colons from Cambodia were displaced after they were expelled by the 1975–1979 Khmer Rouge regime under Pol Pot. A small, predominantly Muslim ethnic group, the Cham people, long residing in Cambodia, were nearly eradicated. The mass exodus of Vietnamese people from Vietnam from 1975 onwards led to the popularisation of the term "boat people".
- In Southwestern China, many Tibetan people emigrated to India, following the 14th Dalai Lama after the failure of his 1959 Tibetan uprising. This wave lasted until the 1960s, and another wave followed when Tibet opened up to trade and tourism in the 1980s. It is estimated that about 200,000 Tibetans live now dispersed worldwide, half of them in India, Nepal and Bhutan. In lieu of lost citizenship papers, the Central Tibetan Administration offers Green Book identity documents to Tibetan refugees.
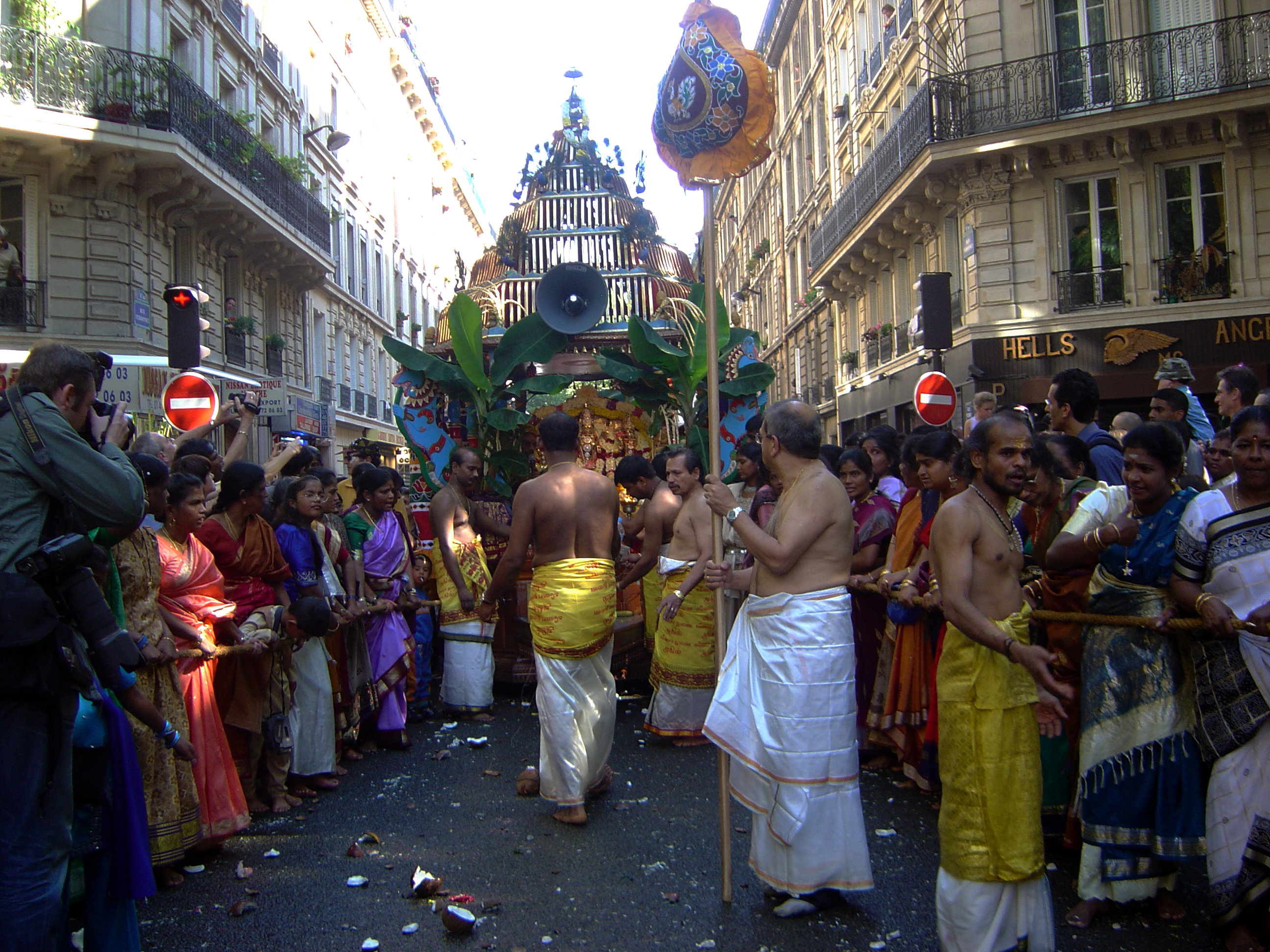
- Celebrations of Murugan by the Sri Lankan Tamil community in Paris, France
  Sri Lankan Tamils have historically migrated to find work, notably, during the British colonial period (1796–1948). Since the beginning of the Sri Lankan Civil War in 1983, more than 800,000 Tamils have been displaced within Sri Lanka as a local diaspora, and over a half-million Tamils have emigrated as the Tamil diaspora to destinations such as India, Australia, New Zealand, Canada, the UK, and Europe.
- The Afghan diaspora resulted from the 1979 invasion of Afghanistan by the former Soviet Union, resulting in the creation of the second-largest refugee population in the world as of 2018 (2.6 million in 2018).
- Many Iranians fled from the 1979 Iranian Revolution which culminated in the fall of the USA/British-ensconced Shah.
- In Africa, a new series of diasporas was formed after the end of colonial rule. In some cases, as countries became independent, numerous minority descendants of Europeans emigrated; others stayed.
- Uganda expelled 80,000 South Asians in 1972 and took over their businesses and properties.
- The 1990–1994 Rwandan Civil War between rival social/ethnic groups (Hutu and Tutsi) turned deadly and produced a mass efflux of refugees.
- In Latin America, following the 1959 Cuban Revolution and the introduction of communism, over a million people have left Cuba.
- A new Jamaican diaspora formed around the start of the 21st century. More than 1 million Dominicans live abroad, a majority living in the US.
- A million Colombian refugees have left Colombia since 1965 to escape violence and civil wars.
- Thousands of Argentine and Uruguay refugees fled to Europe during periods of military rule in the 1970s and 1980s.
- In Central America, Nicaraguans, Salvadorans, Guatemalans, and Hondurans have fled conflict and poor economic conditions.
- Hundreds of thousands of people fled from the Rwandan genocide in 1994 and moved into neighboring countries.
- Between 4 and 6 million have emigrated from Zimbabwe beginning in the 1990s especially since 2000, greatly increasing the Zimbabwean diaspora due to a protracted socioeconomic crisis, forming large communities in South Africa, the United Kingdom, Australia, Canada, and smaller communities in the United States, New Zealand and Ireland. The long war in Congo, in which numerous nations have been involved, has also result in millions of displaced refugees.
- A South Korean diaspora movement during the 1990s caused the homeland fertility rate to drop when a large amount of the middle class emigrated, as the rest of the population continued to age. To counteract the change in these demographics, the South Korean government initiated a diaspora-engagement policy in 1997.

== 21st century ==
=== Middle East ===
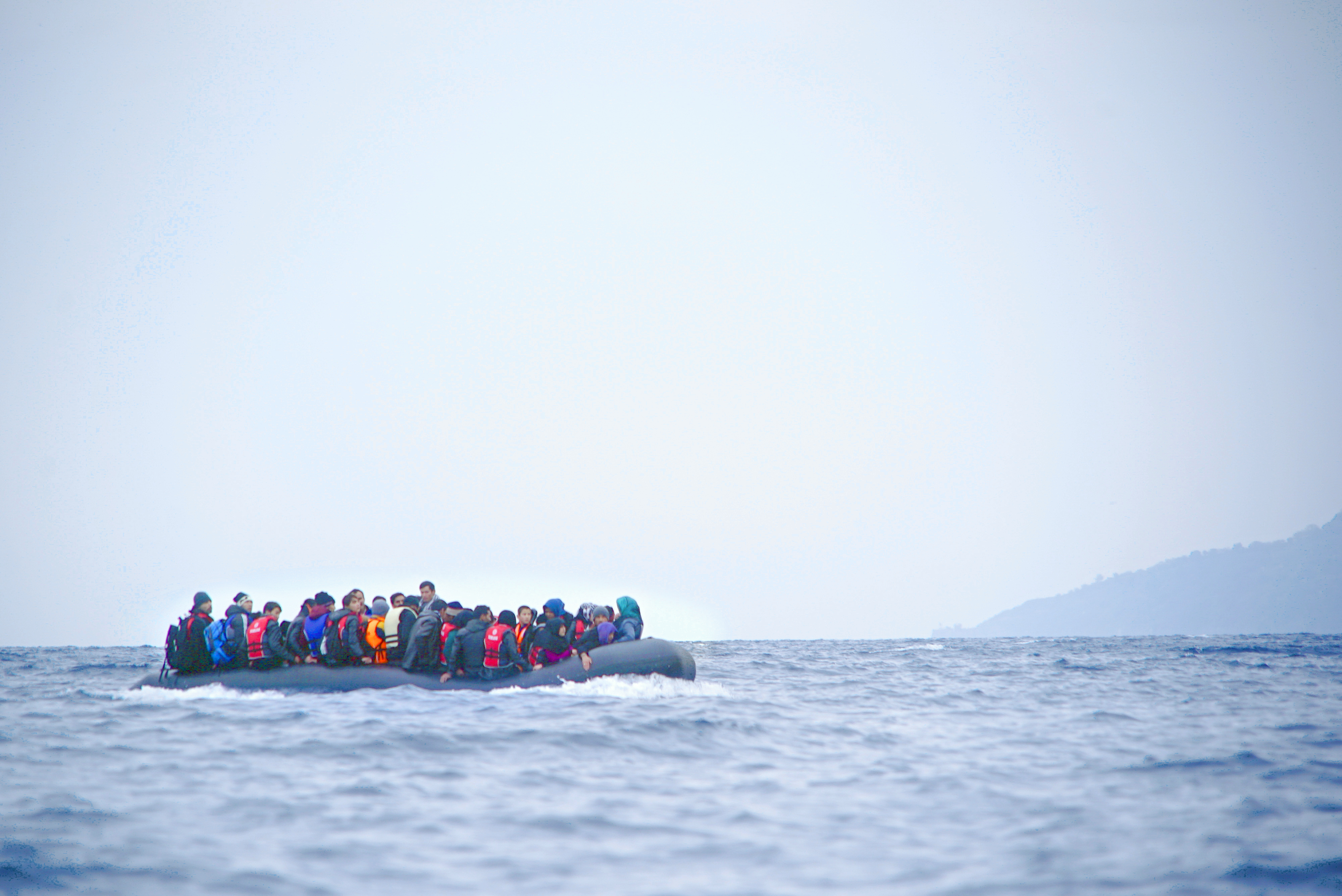
Migrants crossing the Aegean Sea from Turkey to the Greek island of Lesbos during the 2015 European migrant crisis

The 2015 European migrant crisis was a period of significantly increased movement of refugees and migrants into Europe, namely from the Middle East. An estimated 1.3 million people came to the continent to request asylum, the most in a single year since World War II. They were mostly Syrians, but also included a significant number of people from Afghanistan, Pakistan, Iraq, Nigeria, Eritrea, and the Balkans. The increase in asylum seekers has been attributed to factors such as the escalation of various wars in the Middle East and ISIL's territorial and military dominance in the region due to the Arab Winter, as well as Lebanon, Jordan, and Egypt ceasing to accept Syrian asylum seekers.

The EU attempted to enact some measures to address the problem, including distributing refugees among member countries, tackling root causes of emigration in the home countries of migrants, and simplifying deportation processes. However, due to a lack of political coordination at the European level, the distribution of countries was unequal, with some countries taking in many more refugees than others.

The initial responses of national governments varied greatly. Many European Union (EU) governments reacted by closing their borders, and most countries refused to take in the arriving refugees. Germany would ultimately accept most of the refugees after the government decided to temporarily suspend its enforcement of the Dublin Regulation. Germany would receive over 440,000 asylum applications (0.5% of the population). Other countries that took in a significant number of refugees include Hungary (174,000; 1.8%), Sweden (156,000; 1.6%) and Austria (88,000; 1.0%).

The crisis had significant political consequences in Europe. The influx of migrants caused significant demographic and cultural changes in these countries. As a consequence, the public showed anxiety towards the sudden influx of immigrants, often expressing concerns over a perceived danger to European values. Political polarization increased, confidence in the European Union fell, and many countries tightened their asylum laws. Right-wing populist parties capitalized on public anxiety and became significantly more popular in many countries. There was an increase in protests regarding immigration and the circulation of the white nationalist conspiracy theory of the Great Replacement.

=== Venezuelan refugee crisis ===
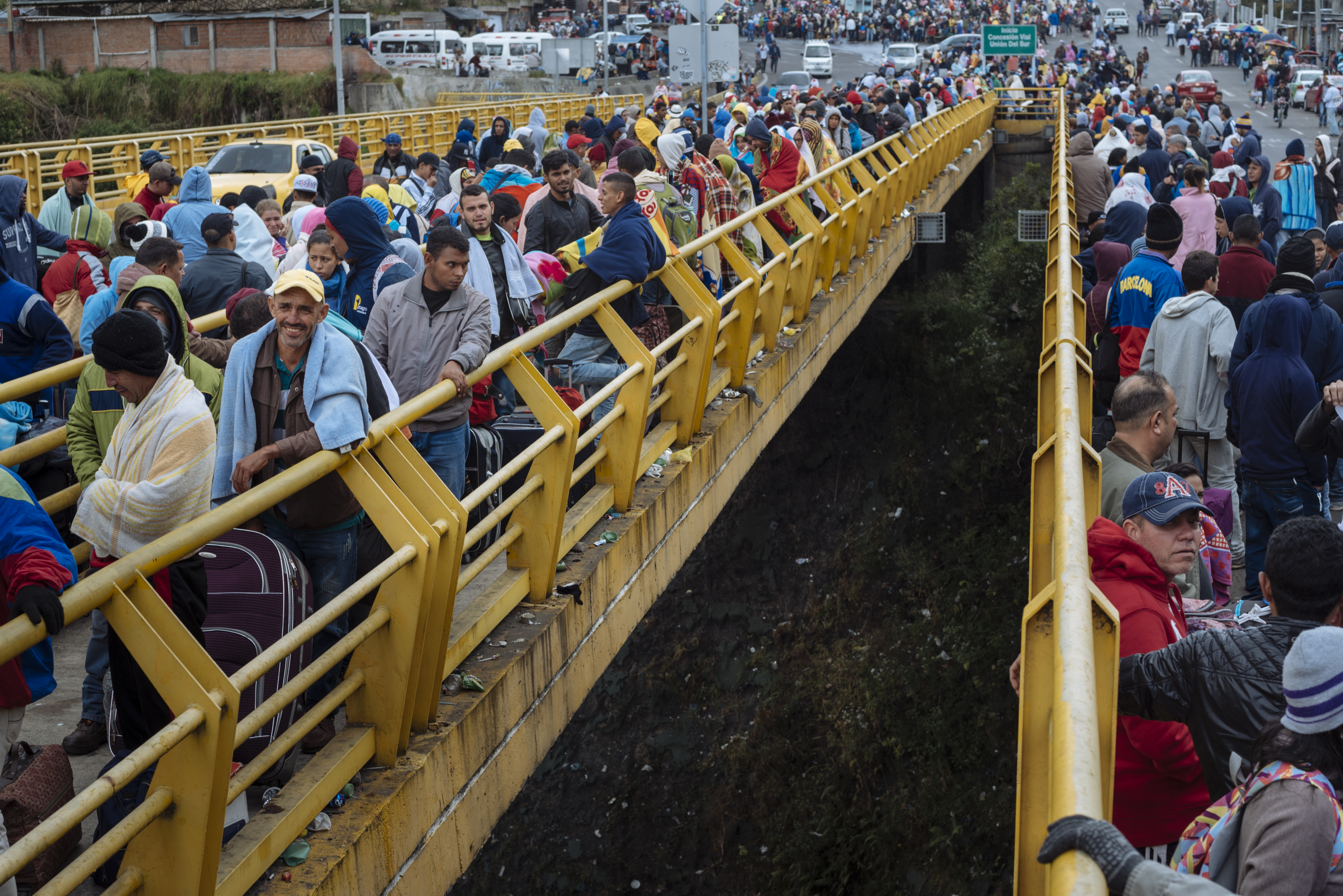
Venezuelan refugees in 2018

The Venezuelan refugee crisis, the largest recorded refugee crisis in the Americas, refers to the emigration of millions of Venezuelans from their native country during the presidencies of Hugo Chávez and Nicolás Maduro since the Bolivarian Revolution. The revolution was an attempt by Chávez and later Maduro to establish a cultural and political hegemony, which culminated in the crisis in Venezuela. The resulting refugee crisis has been compared to those faced by Cuban exiles, Syrian refugees and those affected by the European migrant crisis. The Bolivarian government has denied any migratory crisis, stating that the United Nations and others are attempting to justify foreign intervention within Venezuela.

Newsweek described the "Bolivarian diaspora" as "a reversal of fortune on a massive scale", where the reversal refers to Venezuela's high immigration rate during the 20th century. Initially, upper class Venezuelans and scholars emigrated during Chávez's presidency, but middle- and lower-class Venezuelans began to leave as conditions worsened in the country. This has caused a brain drain that affects the nation, due to the large number of emigrants who are educated or skilled. During the crisis, Venezuelans have been asked about their desire to leave their native country; over 30 percent of respondents to a December 2015 survey said that they planned to permanently leave Venezuela. The percentage nearly doubled the following September as, according to Datincorp, 57 percent of respondents wanted to leave the country. By mid-2019, over four million Venezuelans had emigrated since the revolution began in 1999.

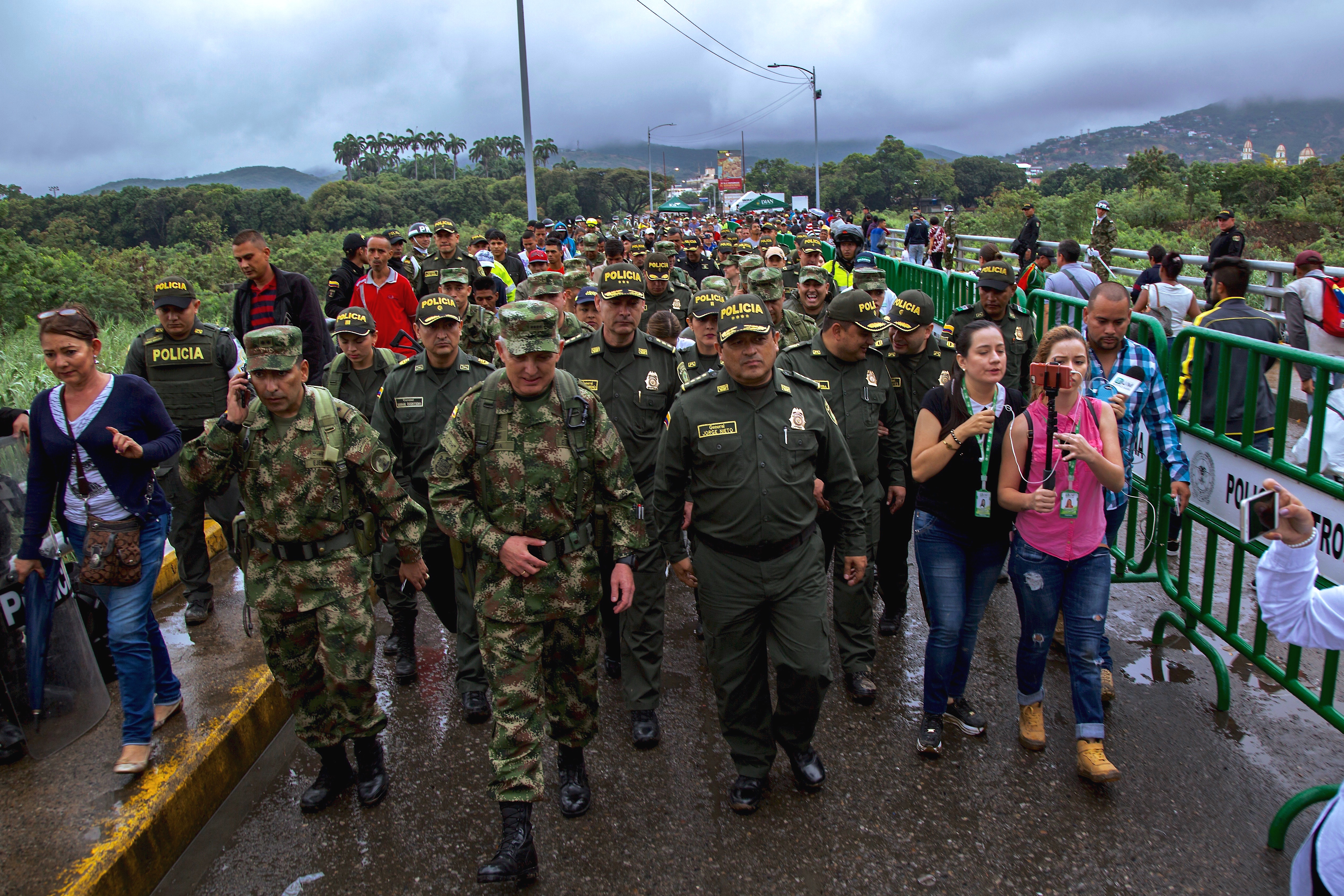
Officers of the National Police of Colombia leading Venezuelan refugees from San Antonio del Táchira, Venezuela, toward Villa del Rosario, Norte de Santander, Colombia.

The United Nations predicted that by the end of 2019, there would have been over 5 million recorded emigrants during the Venezuelan crisis, over 15% of the population. A late-2018 study by the Brookings Institution suggested that emigration would reach 6 million – approximately 20% of Venezuela's 2017 population – by the end of 2019, with a mid-2019 poll by Consultares 21 estimating that up to 6 million Venezuelans had fled the country by this point; estimates going into 2020 suggested that the number of Venezuelan migrants and refugees was overtaking the 6 million figure, at this time the same number of refugees from the Syrian Civil War, which started years before the recorded Venezuelan crisis and was considered the worst humanitarian disaster in the world at the time. Estimates had risen to 7.1 million by October 2022, over 20 percent of the country's population.

The Norwegian Refugee Council, the Brookings Institution and the Organization of American States commissioner for the Venezuelan refugee crisis, David Smolansky, have estimated that the crisis is also one of the most underfunded refugee crisis in modern history.

According to the UNHCR, more than 7.7 million people have emigrated from Venezuela in the years corresponding to Maduro's rise to power and the consolidation of Chavismo. From May to August 2023, 390,000 Venezuelans left their country, driven by despair over challenging living conditions, characterized by low wages, rampant inflation, lack of public services, and political repression. However, R4V suggests that these figures could be even higher, as many migrants without regular status are not included in the count. The organization's calculation method is based on asylum requests and refugee registrations in each country, which might exclude those in irregular situations. Despite the upcoming presidential elections, hope is scarce among Venezuelans. Many fear that through manipulations and frauds, Maduro might "get re-elected" and remain in power for another six years, despite his unpopularity. In this scenario, emigration might continue to be a constant in Venezuela's near future.

== Diaspora Internet services ==
Numerous web-based news portals and forum sites are dedicated to specific diaspora communities, often organized on the basis of an origin characteristic and a current location characteristic. The location-based networking features of mobile applications such as China's WeChat have also created de facto online diaspora communities when used outside of their home markets. Diaspora Internet services have also become important places for maintaining cultural identity and social connections across borders. Through websites, messaging applications, social media sites, and communication forums, the diaspora can remain in contact with family and friends, exchange information, and interact with one another in their countries of origin, which enables them to retain traditions, customs, languages, and collective memories despite their dispersion.

Digital technologies have changed the ways in which cultural identities are created and expressed. Many members of diaspora communities participate simultaneously in the social and cultural life of both their countries of origin and their countries of residence via online communication, causing the production of hybrid or transnational identities that blend various cultures and social experiences.

== Diaspora languages ==
Municipalities where Talian is co-official in Rio Grande do Sul, Brazil

The term diaspora language, coined in the 1980s, is a sociolinguistic idea referring to a variety of languages spoken by peoples with common roots who have dispersed, under various pressures and often globally. The emergence and evolution of a diaspora language is usually part of a larger attempt to retain cultural identity. Examples are Yiddish, African American Vernacular English, Yoruba, Molise Slavic, Istro-Romanian, Griko, Gallo-Italic of Sicily, Talian, Cocoliche, Lunfardo and Arbëresh.

== See also ==
- List of diasporas
- List of sovereign states by immigrant and emigrant population
- Diaspora politics
- Diaspora politics in the United States
- Human migration
- Integration of immigrants
- Population transfer
  - Population transfer in the Soviet Union

=== Specific diasporas ===
- Kurdish refugees
- Anti-Romani sentiment
  - History of the Romani people
    - Romani Holocaust
- Rural exodus

==== Religious diasporas ====
- Ummah
- Jewish history
  - Antisemitism
    - Persecution of Jews
      - History of the Jews during World War II
        - The Holocaust
  - Expulsions and exoduses of Jews
      - The Exodus
    - Jewish exodus from the Muslim world
  - Yom HaAliyah

==== Country-specific diasporas ====
- Exodusters (African American)
- Great Migration (African American)
- History of immigration to the United States

=== Forced migration ===
- Forced displacement
- Expulsion of Poles by Nazi Germany
- Expulsion of the Acadians
- Expulsion of the Moriscos
- Forced settlements in the Soviet Union
- List of expulsions of African Americans
- Long Walk of the Navajo
- Trail of Tears

=== Conflicts and genocides ===
- Ethnic cleansing
- List of ethnic cleansing campaigns
- Late Ottoman genocides
  - Armenian genocide
  - Assyrian genocide
  - Great Famine of Mount Lebanon
  - Greek genocide
- Myanmar conflict
  - Persecution of Muslims in Myanmar
    - Rohingya conflict
      - Rohingya genocide
- Partition of India
- Xinjiang conflict
  - Persecution of Uyghurs in China
- World War II evacuation and expulsion
- Persecution of Yazidis
  - Yazidi genocide

=== Statelessness ===
- State collapse
- Statelessness
- Stateless nation
