= Razmik Grigoryan =

Razmik Grigoryan may refer to:

- Razmik Grigoryan (footballer)
- Razmik Grigoryan (filmmaker)
