= Robin Cohen =

South African sociologist

Robin Cohen (born 1944) is a social scientist working in the fields of globalisation, migration and diaspora studies. He is emeritus Professor of Development Studies and former Director of the International Migration Institute, University of Oxford.

== Career ==
Robin Cohen was born in Johannesburg, South Africa. He left in 1964, returning to the country for three years in the post-Mandela period, when he served as Dean of Humanities at the University of Cape Town (2001–04). He has held appointments at the universities of Ibadan, Nigeria (1967–69), Birmingham, UK (1969–77), the West Indies (Professor of Sociology, 1977–9), Warwick, UK (Professor of Sociology, 1979–2006) and Oxford (2006–). He is former director of the International Migration Institute which forms part of the Oxford Martin School. Cohen was principal investigator on the Oxford Diasporas Programme, funded by the Leverhulme Trust.

== Intellectual contribution ==
Robin Cohen's doctoral work was published as Labour and politics in Nigeria (1974). There followed collaborative work on labour movements and labour history in other parts of Africa. However, his interest and expertise in labour developed into a wider project about the continuing significance of the movement of people across national boundaries and the problems to which this has given rise in very many parts of the world. In The new Helots (1987), he suggested that Marx had underestimated the continuing salience of migrant labour, a feature that allowed capitalism to thrive and thereby evade the fundamental confrontation between worker and employer that Marx predicted.

Cohen made a number of other contributions to the field of migration studies by giving new understandings to key contested concepts such as diaspora and borders, citizens and denizens, and collective or national identity. In Frontiers of identity, (1994) he argued that 'fuzzy' frontiers within the UK and between Britain, the Commonwealth, and the wider world create a particular ambiguous notion of 'Britishness'. His most influential work, Global diasporas, (1997, with subsequent editions and translations) continued his analysis of the relationship between identity and migration. Through the use of typologies, comparisons and suggestive lists of shared characteristics, Cohen was able to employ the ancient concept of diaspora to enrich the study of present-day transnational migrant flows. Along with James Clifford, William Safran, Paul Gilroy and Khachig Tölölyan, Cohen can be considered one of the founding figures of contemporary diaspora studies.

== Bibliography of major works ==
- 2006 Migration and its enemies: global capital, migrant labour and the nation state, Aldershot: Ashgate.
- 2000 Global sociology (with Paul Kennedy), Basingstoke: Macmillan; New York: New York University Press. Basingstoke: Palgrave. Reprinted 2001, 2002, 2004. Japanese translations 2003. Second expanded and revised edition March 2007. NYUP, September 2007. Revised edition 2013.
- 1997 Global diasporas: an introduction, London: UCL Press & Seattle: University of Washington Press. Reprinted 1999, 2000. Reprinted 2001, Palgrave. Japanese translations (Tokyo: Akahi Shoton, 2001 and 2013) by Komai Hiroshi. Greek translation, with new preface, Athens, 2003. Revised second edition, London & New York: Routledge, 2008.
- 1994 Frontiers of identity: the British and the others, London: Longman & New York: Addison Wesley. ISBN 978-0-582-24577-8
- 1991 Contested domains: debates in international labour studies, London: Zed Press. ISBN 978-1-85649-013-9
- 1987 The new Helots: migrants in the international division of labour, Aldershot: Avebury/Gower Publishing Group; paperback edition, Gower, 1988; Japanese translation, 1989; reprinted 1993, 2003.
- 1986 Endgame in South Africa: the changing ideology and social structure of South Africa, Paris: UNESCO Press & London: James Curry; German edition under the title Endspiel Südafrika: Eine Anatomie der Apartheid, Translated by Ulf Dammann, with a foreword by Jean Ziegler, Berlin: Rotbuch Verlag, 1987; US edition, New York: Africa World Press, 1988.
- 1974 Labour and politics in Nigeria: 1945–71, London: Heinemann Education Books & New York: Holmes & Meier/Africana Publishing Corporation. New edition 1982.
