= Trading diaspora =

Descendants of trading-oriented migrants

Trading diasporas is a term coined by Philip D. Curtin to mean: "communities of merchants living among aliens in associated networks".

== History ==
Trading diasporas were formed as a result of international trade that resulted in the settlement of merchants in certain countries where they sold their products. Their importance to the global world was marked by their impact on the spread of cultures and ideologies of certain areas to the rest of the world.

The first mention of trading diasporas dates back around 2000 BCE when the Assyrian merchants traveled to the Anatolian Peninsula in order to sell their goods. Trading diasporas in this period of time were created as a result of the Assyrian traders staying as "semi-permanent residents" in cities of the Anatolian Peninsula. Steve Gosch of the University of Wisconsin–Eau Claire divides the Assyrian traders into two groups: "stayers", who permanently settled on the Anatolian peninsula, and "movers", who traveled back and forth in order to sell their goods.

According to Jane Schneider, the merchants trading prior to 15th century were able to create "asymmetrical links between world regions." Barry Gillis and Andre Gunder Frank go on to say that "the earliest world system contained the essential features of its modern counterpart: asymmetrical relationships between regions in the core and periphery, continuing struggles for hegemony within the core and alternating periods of expansion and contraction in the system as a whole." This means that the relations between different regions in the early modern world were not perfect and differed from the international relations of the modern time. Trading diasporas were able to create cultural and economical ties with different regions rather than a political relationship.

== Causes ==
There are several reasons for the creation of trading diasporas, some of which included a demand for products that were not available in particular regions of the world, the division of the world into small city states who wanted to create economic and cultural ties with the rest of the world and the willingness of people living in certain areas to create their communities abroad and to be represented by them. As Gosch explains, the "premodern world system was to some extent an "archipelago of towns" in which urban centers in Europe (Bruges, Ghent, Genoa and Venice), the Middle East (Cairo, Aden, and Hormuz), and Asia (Samarkand, Calicut, Kanchipuram, Malacca, Quanzhou and Hangzhou) were connected to one another by trade and shared in a common culture of commerce." Strong empires like China and several European states were also using the merchants to create trading diasporas in order to gather information about a certain country and possibly exploit it either in the event of conflict or just for sociable reasons. During this time period, long distance trade "dealt largely if not exclusively with luxury goods or high value relative to their bulk." Therefore, protection of trading diasporas in the countries where diasporas settled was important, as it guaranteed supply of luxury products into the country.

== Jewish diaspora ==
The Jewish diaspora in India in an area called Goa is considered one of the oldest and strongest of the Early Modern World diasporas. The migration of Jews to India can be marked by the discovery of the route to India through the South African coast by the Portuguese. As Walter Fischel, the author of Leading Jews in the service of Portuguese India notes: "Already in 1498 there appeared in the vicinity of Goa on the island of Anjediva the first Western Jew to play a role in the Portuguese Indian history." Prior to the diamond trade, Jews in Portugal were employed as letter carriers, translators and agents. As the Portuguese expansion in India continued, Jews were able to create their own communities and practice their religious traditions. As Dutch traveler J. Van Linschoten noted "There are great numbers of Moores and Jews in all places of India as at Goa, Cochin and within the land… amongst the Indians they have their Synagogues… wherein they use all ceremonies according to their law." Linschoten’s statement explains that Spanish Muslims–Moors and Jews were able to practice their religions in India. This meant that they were able to create communities within the Indian peninsula and preserve their culture and religion. Such cases strongly suggest that rather than living like Indians, Jews created diasporas which helped them preserve their identity. Jews in India were able to trade and practice their religion, unlike in Europe, where they were oppressed and killed. This meant that "a Jew could rise to power and prominence in public life and could become an agent and diplomat in the service of the Portuguese viceroy in Goa."

As Fischel states Jews were also used by the Portuguese to negotiate with the Muslim rulers of India. This was due to the "skill, knowledge and linguistic abilities of non-Christians."

== Surat ==
Surat was a city in Gujarat which at the time of the Portuguese conquest on the northern shores of India became one of the most important trading centers of Asia. Jewish diaspora was closely related to Surat as Jewish merchants plied their commerce through Surat. They, for the most part were jewelers and diamond merchants.

"They came from many parts of the world, from Constantinople, Safed, Baghdad and Portugal, Italy and England, as well as from Yemen, Persia and Jewish colony at Cochin–all attracted by the great economic potential and possibilities of Surat." Therefore, Surat can be considered to be one of the largest centers of Jewish trading and diaspora.

== Significance ==
Trading diasporas were important in a way that they were crucial in a process of establishing long-distance trade, "transfers of technology, imperial and colonial ventures, missionary campaigns, the transatlantic slave trade, and the development of global capitalism." Therefore, trading diasporas were not always a positive community as it led to the establishment of the slave trade and colonialism. However, the interaction between the different nations and long distance trade which was made possible by the existence of trading diasporas was an important vanguard as it led to the development of global markets. In addition to the development of global markets trading diasporas also triggered an exchange of cultures, ideas and technology between the host country and the merchant.

== See also ==
- Middleman minority
- Soninke Wangara
- Jakhanke people
- Dyula people

== Notes and references ==
=== References ===
- Bentley, Jerry H. "Cross Cultural interaction and Periodization in World History." The American Historical Review 101, no. 3 (1996). p. 752
- Fischel, Walter J. "Leading Jews in the Service of Portuguese India." The Jewish quarterly review 47, no. 1 (1956). p. 37-47
- Gosch, Steve. "Cross Cultural Trade as a Framework for Teaching World History: Concepts and Applications." The History Teacher 27, no. 4 (1994). p. 427-429
