= Zarinja Church =

Armenian church built around 635 CE

Surp Khach Church
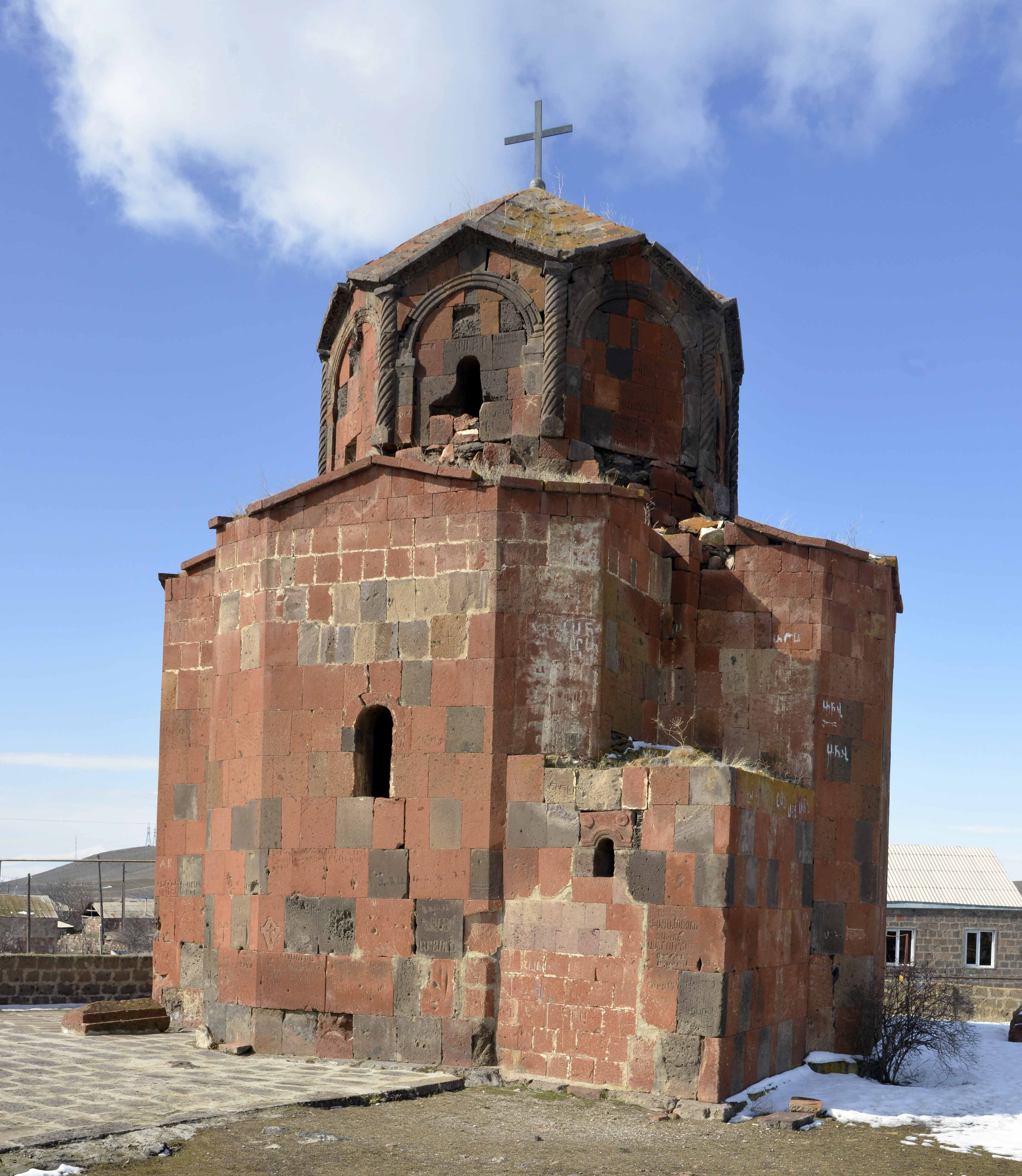

- Location within Armenia

Religion
- Affiliation: Armenian Apostolic Church

Location
- Location: Zarinja, Aragatsotn Province, Armenia
- Coordinates: 40.47648052°N 43.78091455°E

Architecture
- Style: Armenian
- Completed: 635

The Zarinja Sourp Khach Armenian Church is an Armenian Church built circa 635 A.D.

The Church contains a symmetrical plan of design with a folded-wall structure and pyramidal disposition. The church has been resistant to earthquake movement, because it has survived to this day.
