= Zarinja =

Zarinja Զարինջա
- Location within Armenia Location within Aragatsotn
- Coordinates: 40°28′N 43°47′E
- Country: Armenia
- Province: Aragatsotn
- Municipality: Talin
- Elevation: 1,660 m (5,450 ft)

Population (2011)
  - Total: 585
- Time zone: UTC+4
  - Summer (DST): UTC+5

Zarinja (Armenian: Զարինջա) is a village in the Talin Municipality of the Aragatsotn Province of Armenia. The village contains the seventh-century church of Saint Khach, rebuilt in the tenth century.

== Notable people ==
- Razmik Grigoryan, writer and filmmaker
