= Razmik Panossian =

Canadian political scientist (born 1964)

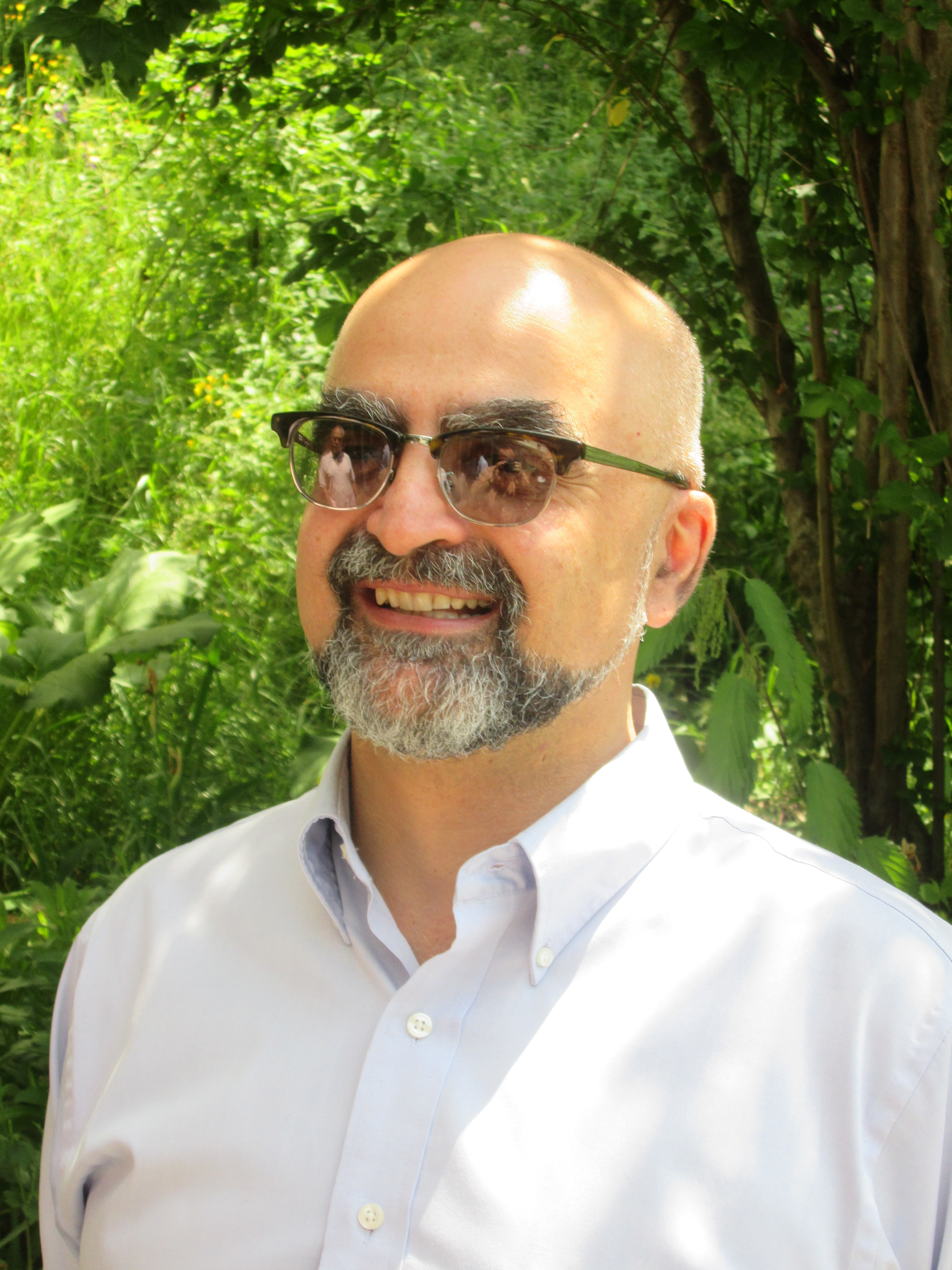
Panossian in 2013

Razmik Panossian (Armenian: Ռազմիկ Փանոսեան, born 1964) is a Canadian-Armenian historian and political scientist.

== Career ==
An ethnic Armenian, Panossian was born in Beirut, Lebanon and raised in Canada in a family "engaged with [Armenian] community affairs." He is fluent in English, French, and Armenian. He received his Ph.D. from the London School of Economics (LSE) in 2002. His thesis was titled "The evolution of multilocal national identity and the contemporary politics of nationalism: Armenia and its diaspora."

He was director of policy at the International Centre for Human Rights and Democratic Development and has served as an international consultant, including at the United Nations Development Programme (UNDP). He has lectured at the LSE and at the SOAS, University of London. Panossian, currently based in Portugal, has been the director of the department of Armenian communities for the Calouste Gulbenkian Foundation since 2013.

== Publications ==
=== The Armenians ===
Panossian is the author of The Armenians: From Kings and Priests to Merchants and Commissars (ISBN 9780231139267), published by the Columbia University Press in 2006. The book was widely acclaimed for its extensive and balanced coverage of Armenian history and national identity. James R. Russell praised the book in his review as the "most meticulously researched and scholarly study of the development of Armenian national identity ever written in any language; and it is also the best general study of the Armenians I have read." Levon Chorbajian wrote that despite his slight objection, the book is "a remarkably balanced, empirically sound, and theoretically engaging one." William Safran wrote of the book: "a first-rate piece of scholarship. It is exhaustively documented; its footnote references alone are accompanied by details that greatly amplify and complement the text, and the provision of population statistics and other hard data is balanced by numerous poetic evocations of Armenian feelings. The book may well serve as a model for the study of other diaspora nations."

=== Books ===
- Panossian, Razmik (2006). The Armenians: From Kings and Priests to Merchants and Commissars. New York: Columbia University Press. ISBN 0-231-13926-8.

=== Edited volumes ===
- Schwartz, Donald V; Panossian, Razmik (1994). Nationalism and history: the politics of nationbuilding in post-Soviet Armenia, Azerbaijan and Georgia. Toronto, Ont.: Center for Russian and East European Studies. ISBN 978-0-9697723-0-9. OCLC 925549193.

=== Book chapters ===
- Panossian, Razmik (2004). "Homeland–diaspora relations and identity differences." The Armenians: Past and Present in the Making of National Identity.
- Panossian, Razmik. "Courting a diaspora: Armenia-diaspora relations since 1998." In International Migration and Sending Countries, pp. 140–168. Palgrave Macmillan, London, 2003.
- Panossian, Razmik. "Post-Soviet Armenia. Nationalism and its Discontent (s)." After Independence: Making and Protecting the Nation in Postcolonial and Postcommunist States, ed. Lowell W. Barrington (2006): 225-247.
- Panossian, Razmik. "The diaspora and the Karabagh movement: oppositional politics between the Armenian Revolutionary Federation and the Armenian National Movement." In The Making of Nagorno-Karabagh, pp. 155–177. Palgrave Macmillan, London, 2001.

=== Journal articles ===
- Panossian, Razmik (1998). "Between ambivalence and intrusion: Politics and identity in Armenia-diaspora relations". Diaspora: A Journal of Transnational Studies. 7 (2): 149–196. doi:10.1353/dsp.1998.0011. S2CID 144037630.
- Panossian, Razmik (2001). "The Irony of Nagorno-Karabakh: Formal Institutions versus Informal Politics". Regional & Federal Studies. 11 (3): 143–164. doi:10.1080/714004708. S2CID 145643230.
- Panossian, Razmik (2002). "The Past as Nation: Three Dimensions of Armenian Identity". Geopolitics. 7 (2): 127. doi:10.1080/714000931. S2CID 144667260.

=== Dissertation ===
- Panossian, Razmik. "The evolution of multilocal national identity and the contemporary politics of nationalism: Armenia and its diaspora." PhD diss., London School of Economics and Political Science (University of London), 2002.
