= Khachig Tölölyan =

Armenian-American scholar (born 1944)

- Խաչիկ Թէօլէօլեան
- Born: 1944 (age 81–82); Aleppo, Syria

Education
- Education: Harvard University; University of Rhode Island; Wesleyan University; Brown University

Philosophical work
- Era: Contemporary philosophy 20th century philosophy
- Region: Western philosophy
- Institutions: Wesleyan University
- Language: English, Armenian
- Main interests: Diaspora studies, globalization, nationalism, transnationalism, world literature, narratology, modern novel, literary theory, film theory, Thomas Pynchon

Khachig Tölölyan (Western Armenian: Խաչիկ Թէօլէօլեան; born 1944) is an Armenian-American scholar of diaspora studies.

== Biography ==
=== Early life ===
Tölölyan was born in 1944 in Aleppo, Syria to Minas Tölölyan and Kohar Tölölyan (née Chobanian), Armenian intellectuals and educators from Turkey. He grew up in the Armenian diaspora communities of the Middle East. The Tölölyans resided in Aleppo before relocating to Cairo, Egypt in 1956, and then Beirut, Lebanon in 1957. In 1960, they eventually moved to the US, settling in Watertown, Massachusetts.

=== Education ===
Tölölyan graduated from Harvard University with a B.A. in Molecular Biology and later acquired an M.A. in English from the University of Rhode Island, an M.A.A. from Wesleyan University, and a PhD from Brown University in Comparative Literature.

=== Career ===
Tölölyan was a professor of English and Letters at Wesleyan University until his retirement in 2021. He is the founder of the academic journal Diaspora: A Journal of Transnational Studies, which has published articles by notable scholars such as Rey Chow, Vijay Mishra, and Lisa Lowe. The journal was initially published by Oxford University Press. Since 1996, it has been published by the University of Toronto Press.

Tölölyan has also published articles on literature, including on the novelist Thomas Pynchon, terrorism, nationalism, diasporas, transnationalism, and globalization. He is considered a founder of the academic discipline of diaspora studies. Tölölyan is the author of several hundred columns and articles in Armenian.

== Publications ==
Tölölyan's most cited publications are:

- Tölölyan, Khachig (1996). "Rethinking diaspora(s): Stateless power in the transnational moment". Diaspora. 5 (1): 3–36. doi:10.1353/dsp.1996.0000. S2CID 145562896.
- Tölölyan, Khachig (1991). "The Nation-State and Its Others: In Lieu of a Preface". Diaspora. 1 (1): 3–7. doi:10.1353/dsp.1991.0008. S2CID 144826260.
