= Razmik Mouradian =

Russian-Armenian monumentalist sculptor (born 1938)

- Born: May 20, 1938 (age 87); Yerevan, Armenian SSR, USSR
- Occupation: Sculptor
- Awards: Gold medal from the Russian Academy of Arts (2012); Laureate of All-Russian competitions, Holder of All-Union competitions diploma in monumental art; Certificate of honor of the Union of Artists of the USSR

Razmik Khachikovich Mouradian (Russian: Размик Хачикович Мурадян; Armenian; Ռազմիկ Խաչիկի Մուրադյան; born May 20, 1938) is a Russian-Armenian monumentalist sculptor.

== Biography ==
Mouradian was born in Yerevan, Armenia on May 20, 1938. He moved to Moscow at age 16 in the 1950s and graduated from the studio of Nikolai Nikoghosyan in 1956. Initially, Mouradian's sculptures were portraits, exclusively in wood and marble but later, in the 1970s, he began to make full figures and statues out of bronze.

Mouradian's art has been displayed in galleries worldwide and is featured in permanent exhibits at the Tretyakov Gallery and the Russian Museum. He has been a member of the Russian Academy of Arts since 2012 and was a member of the Artists' Union of the USSR from 1963 until its dissolution.

Mouradian currently resides in Moscow.
