= John Stockwood =

English clergyman, preacher, translator and school-master

John Stockwood (died 1610) was an English clergyman, preacher, translator of Protestant texts and school-master.

== Life ==
He was from Kent, and was a pensioner of St John's College, Cambridge, when Queen Elizabeth I visited the university in August 1564, matriculating on 4 October in that year, and admitted a scholar on the Lady Margaret's foundation on 10 November following. He graduated B.A. from the University of Heidelberg in 1567, and was incorporated in that degree at Oxford on 19 May 1575 when he stated that he was about to open an 'Indus literarius' at Cambridge. He was admitted M.A. at Oxford on 9 July 1575, and was incorporated in that degree at Cambridge in 1579.

In 1571, he occurred as minister of Battle, Sussex. He was appointed headmaster of Tonbridge School, Kent, by the Skinners' Company of London, a position he held from 1578 to 1588. It is supposed that Sir Robert Heath was one of his pupils.

He was a celebrated and powerful preacher, and obtained the vicarage of Tonbridge. He was one of the select groups of Puritans (with Laurence Chaderton, George Gifford, Laurence Humphrey, John Knewstub, Thomas Sampson, and Henry Smith) who preached at Paul's Cross. His style was very plain, in common with Bartimaeus Andrewes, Chaderton, Gifford, Stephen Egerton, William Fulke, William Perkins, and Hugh Roberts. He had strong Sabbatarian views, was one of the Puritan critics of the theatre, and took particular exception to semi-nude dancing. He also felt schooling paid too much attention to classical authors.

At one period, he was in great poverty. The records of the corporation of Gravesend show that on 30 August 1594 he received a contribution of forty shillings out of the stock of the chamber of that town, requested by Sir Robert Sidney. He had ceased to be the master of Tonbridge School by 1597, when his textbook Progymnasma Scholasticum was published. In the dedication of that work to Robert Devereux, 2nd Earl of Essex, he acknowledges his kindness in relieving his poverty and protecting him from antagonists. It is believed that he retained the vicarage of Tonbridge until his death, buried there on 27 July 1610. Jonathan Stockwood of St. John's College, Cambridge (B. A. 1606, M. A. 1609), may have been his son.

== Works ==
His principal works, mainly translations of devotional works by continental reformers, are

- Common Places of Christian Religion, London, 1572, 1581; translated from the Latin of Henry Bullinger, and dedicated to Henry, Earl of Huntingdon.
- The Treasure of Trueth . . . newlie turned into English, London [1576]; from the Latin of Theodore Beza; another edition 1581.
- A Shorte . . . Treatize of the Plague, London, 1580; translated from the Latin of Theodore Beza, and dedicated to Sir Henry Sidney.
- A Short Catechisme for House Houlders. With prayers to the same adjoyning [by Edward Dering, B.D.]. . . Gathered by J.S., London, 1582 and 1583.
- Of the Duetie of a Faithful and Wise Magistrate, in preserving and delivering of the com[m]on wealth from infection in the time of the Plague or Pestilence, London, 1583; translated from the Latin (1582) of Johannes Ewich.
- A verie profitable and necessarie discourse concerning the observation and keeping of the Sabbath day, London, 1584; translated from the Latin of Zacharias Ursinus.
- A verie godlie and profitable sermon of the necessitie, properties, and office of a good magistrate (1584).
- A Right Godly . . . discourse upon the book of Ester, London, 1584; from the Latin of John Brentius; dedicated to Sir Francis Walsingham.
- A godlie and learned Commentarie upon the excellent book of Solomon, commonly called Ecclesiastes, or the Preacher, London, 1585; translated from the Latin of Joannes Serranus (Jean de Serres).
- An exposition of the 51 Psalme, by Wolph. Musculus, translated, London, 1586; from Wolfgang Musculus.
- A Bartholmew Fairing for parentes, to bestow vpon their sonnes and daughters, and for one friend to giue vnto another; shewing that children are not to marie without the consent of their parentes, London, 1589.
- A plaine and easie laying open of the Meaning and Vnderstanding of the Rules of Construction in the English Accidence, appointed by authentic to be taught in all schooles of hir Maiesties dominions, for the great vse and benefite of young beginners, London, 1590; 1703.
- A fruitfull Commentarie upon the twelve Small Prophets, Cambridge, 1594; translated from the Latin of Lambert Danaeus, and dedicated to the Earl and Countess of Huntingdon.
- Progymnasma Scholasticum. Hoc est, Epigrammatum Graecorum ex Anthologia selectorum ab He. Stephano duplicique ejusdem interpretatione explicatorum Praxis Grammatica, London, 1597; dedicated to the Earl of Essex.
- Disputatiuncularum grammaticalium libellus, ad puerorum in scholis triuialibus exacuenda ingenia excogitatus, London, 1598; 4th edit; again 1650.
