= William Safran =

American academic (1930–2026)

William Safran (July 8, 1930 – January 22, 2026) was an American academic and Holocaust survivor who was professor emeritus of political science at the University of Colorado Boulder. It has been argued that Safran "has contributed substantially to the body of knowledge regarding ethnic politics, nationalism, and related subjects, such as institutional and cultural pluralism, citizenship, immigration, diaspora, national identity, and the politics of language and religion". He was a specialist on France, and much of his research concerned French ethnic politics.

== Life and career ==
Safran was born in Dresden, Germany, on July 8, 1930, to Romanian and Polish immigrant parents. In his youth under the Nazi regime in Germany, he spent a total of more than three years in a ghetto, forced-labour camp and concentration camp. After liberation, he spent four months in a United Nations displaced persons camp. He migrated to the United States in 1946 with the surviving members of his family. He subsequently gained a BA degree in history and an MA in international affairs from City College of New York, served for two years in the US army, and gained a PhD in public law and government from Columbia University, under the supervision of Otto Kirchheimer, in 1964. He was appointed to the post of assistant professor at the University of Colorado Boulder in 1965. He retired from a full professorship at the same institution in 2003.

He was editor-in-chief of the journal Nationalism and Ethnic Politics from its founding in 1995 until 2010. He has also served as a series editor for the Routledge series on nationalism and ethnicity, and has chaired the International Political Science Association's Research Committee on Politics and Ethnicity and co-chaired its Research Committee on Language and Politics. He has held visiting professorships at the Hebrew University of Jerusalem and the universities of Nice, Grenoble, Bordeaux, and Santiago de Compostela.

Safran died on January 22, 2026, at the age of 95.

== Bibliography ==
Safran's publications include the following books:

- Veto-Group Politics: The Case of Health Insurance Reform in West Germany (1967)
- The French Polity (seven editions, 1977–2008)
- Ideology and Politics: The Socialist Party of France (1979)
- Politics in Europe (five editions, 1993–2011)

He also edited or co-edited several books, including:

- Language, Ethnicity and the State (2005)
- Transnational Migrations: The Indian Diaspora (2009)
