= Poland national football team results (2000–2019) =

- Win Draw Loss

This is a list of the Poland national football team results from 2000 to 2019.

== Matches ==
=== Results ===
==== 2000s ====
26 January 2000 Friendly	Spain	3–0	Poland	Cartagena, Spain
21:45	Raúl 15'; Urzaiz 56', 58'	Report		Stadium: Estadio Cartagonova; Attendance: 15,000; Referee: Éric Poulat (France)

23 February 2000 Friendly	France	1–0	Poland	Saint-Denis, France
20:45	Zidane 87'	Report		Stadium: Stade de France; Attendance: 74,341; Referee: Kyros Vassaras (Greece)

29 March 2000 Friendly	Hungary	0–0	Poland	Debrecen, Hungary
20:15		Report		Stadium: Oláh Gábor utcai Stadion; Attendance: 7,000; Referee: Zoran Arsić (Yugoslavia)

26 April 2000 Friendly	Poland	0–0	Finland	Poznań, Poland
20:00		Report		Stadium: Stadion Miejski; Attendance: 15,000; Referee: Juhos Attila (Hungary)

4 June 2000 Friendly	Netherlands	3–1	Poland	Lausanne, Switzerland
18:00	F.De Boer 29'; Kluivert 56', 60'	Report	Kryszałowicz 38'	Stadium: Stade Olympique de la Pontaise; Attendance: 7,000; Referee: Dominique Tavel (Switzerland)

16 August 2000 Friendly	Romania	1–1	Poland	Bucharest, Romania
18:00	Ilie 21'	Report	Olisadebe 79'	Stadium: Stadionul Cotroceni; Attendance: 5,000; Referee: Atanas Uzunov (Bulgaria)

2 September 2000 2002 World Cup qualification	Ukraine	1–3	Poland	Kyiv, Ukraine
18:00	Shevchenko 12'	Report	Olisadebe 2', 31'; Kałużny 58'	Stadium: Olimpiyskiy National Sports Complex; Attendance: 52,500; Referee: José María García-Aranda (Spain)

7 October 2000 2002 World Cup qualification	Poland	3–1	Belarus	Łódź, Poland
20:00	Kałużny 24', 63', 74'	Report	Ryndzyuk 37'	Stadium: Stadion Widzewa; Attendance: 7,638; Referee: Anders Frisk (Sweden)

11 October 2000 2002 World Cup qualification	Poland	0–0	Wales	Warsaw, Poland
20:00		Report		Stadium: Polish Army Stadium; Attendance: 10,067; Referee: Lucílio Batista (Portugal)

15 November 2000 Friendly	Poland	1–0	Iceland	Warsaw, Poland
18:00	Frankowski 62' (pen.)	Report		Stadium: Polish Army Stadium; Attendance: 5,000; Referee: Kostas Kapitanis (Cyprus)

==== 2001 ====
28 February 2001 Friendly	Poland	4–0	Switzerland	Larnaca, Cyprus
18:00	Olisadebe 21'; Karwan 45'; Hajto 59' (pen.); Krzynówek 90'	Report		Stadium: Antonis Papadopoulos Stadium; Attendance: 200; Referee: Tasos Papaioannou (Cyprus)

24 March 2001 2002 World Cup qualification	Norway	2–3	Poland	Oslo, Norway
16:00	Carew 59'; Solskjær 67'	Report	Olisadebe 23', 30'; Karwan 81'	Stadium: Ullevaal Stadion; Attendance: 15,077; Referee: Stuart Dougal (Scotland)

28 March 2001 2002 World Cup qualification	Poland	4–0	Armenia	Warsaw, Poland
19:00	Mi. Żewłakow 15' (pen.); Olisadebe 42'; Ma. Żewłakow 81'; Karwan 88'	Report		Stadium: Polish Army Stadium; Attendance: 10,320; Referee: Eric Poulat (France)

25 April 2001 Friendly	Poland	1–1	Scotland	Bydgoszcz, Poland
20:00	Kałużny 50'	Report	Booth 70' (pen.)	Stadium: Stadion Zawiszy Bydgoszcz; Attendance: 18,000; Referee: Juan Ansuátegui Roca (Spain)

2 June 2001 2002 World Cup qualification	Wales	1–2	Poland	Cardiff, Wales
15:00	Blake 14'	Report	Olisadebe 32'; Kryszałowicz 72'	Stadium: Millennium Stadium; Attendance: 48,500; Referee: Erol Ersoy (Turkey)

6 June 2001 2002 World Cup qualification	Armenia	1–1	Poland	Yerevan, Armenia
20:00	Petrosyan 11'	Report	Kałużny 4'	Stadium: Hanrapetakan Marzadasht; Attendance: 5,500; Referee: Eric Romain (Belgium)

15 August 2001 Friendly	Iceland	1–1	Poland	Reykjavík, Iceland
19:00	Sigþórsson 86'	Report	Hreiðarsson 18' (o.g.)	Stadium: Laugardalsvöllur; Attendance: 4,345; Referee: Mario van der Ende (Netherlands)

1 September 2001 2002 World Cup qualification	Poland	3–0	Norway	Chorzów, Poland
17:45	Kryszałowicz 45+1'; Olisadebe 77'; Ma. Żewłakow 88'	Report		Stadium: Stadion Śląski; Attendance: 40,000; Referee: Miroslav Liba (Czech Republic)

5 September 2001 2002 World Cup qualification	Belarus	4–1	Poland	Minsk, Belarus
20:00	Vasilyuk 7', 46', 52', 61'	Report	Ma. Żewłakow 78'	Stadium: Dinamo Stadium; Attendance: 24,302; Referee: Konrad Plautz (Austria)

6 October 2001 2002 World Cup qualification	Poland	1–1	Ukraine	Chorzów, Poland
15:30	Olisadebe 40'	Report	Shevchenko 81'	Stadium: Stadion Śląski; Attendance: 20,900; Referee: Hugh Dallas (Scotland)

14 November 2001 Friendly	Poland	0–0	Cameroon	Poznań, Poland
18:00		Report		Stadium: Stadion Miejski; Attendance: 22,000; Referee: Ľuboš Micheľ (Slovakia)

==== 2002 ====
10 February 2002 Friendly	Poland	2–1	Faroe Islands	Limassol, Cyprus
17:00	Żurawski 11', 42' (pen.)	Report	Jacobsen 25'	Stadium: Tsirio Stadium; Attendance: 50; Referee: Kostas Theodotou (Cyprus)

13 February 2002 Friendly	Northern Ireland	1–4	Poland	Limassol, Cyprus
19:45	Lomas 17'	Report	Kryszałowicz 6', 66'; Kałużny 11'; Marcin Żewłakow 69'	Stadium: Tsirio Stadium; Attendance: 221; Referee: Tasos Papaioannou (Cyprus)

27 March 2002 Friendly	Poland	0–2	Japan	Łódź, Poland
16:15		Report	Nakata 10'; Takahara 42'	Stadium: Stadion Widzewa; Attendance: 6,000; Referee: Hermann Albrecht (Germany)

17 April 2002 Friendly	Poland	1–2	Romania	Bydgoszcz, Poland
17:30	Hajto 86'	Report	Ganea 31'; Mutu 36'	Stadium: Stadion Zawiszy Bydgoszcz; Attendance: 18,000; Referee: Yuri Baskakov (Russia)

18 May 2002 Friendly	Poland	1–0	Estonia	Warsaw, Poland
20:00	Żurawski 56'	Report		Stadium: Polish Army Stadium; Attendance: 8,500; Referee: Emil Božinovski (Macedonia)

4 June 2002 2002 World Cup	South Korea	2–0	Poland	Busan, South Korea
20:30	Hwang Sun-hong 26'; Yoo Sang-chul 53'	Report		Stadium: Busan Asiad Main Stadium; Attendance: 48,760; Referee: Óscar Ruiz (Colombia)

10 June 2002 2002 World Cup	Portugal	4–0	Poland	Jeonju, South Korea
20:30	Pauleta 14', 65', 77'; Rui Costa 88'	Report		Stadium: Jeonju World Cup Stadium; Attendance: 31,000; Referee: Hugh Dallas (Scotland)

14 June 2002 2002 World Cup	Poland	3–1	United States	Daejeon, South Korea
20:30	Olisadebe 3'; Kryszałowicz 5'; Marcin Żewłakow 66'	Report	Donovan 83'	Stadium: Daejeon World Cup Stadium; Attendance: 26,482; Referee: Lu Jun (China)

21 August 2002 Friendly	Poland	1–1	Belgium	Szczecin, Poland
20:00	Żurawski 4'	Report	Sonck 41'	Stadium: Stadion Miejski; Attendance: 19,000; Referee: Martin Ingvarsson (Sweden)

7 September 2002 UEFA Euro 2004 qualifying	San Marino	0–2	Poland	Serravalle, San Marino
20:00		Report	Kaczorowski 75'; Kukiełka 88'	Stadium: Stadio Olimpico; Attendance: 2,421; Referee: Paul McKeon (Ireland)

12 October 2002 UEFA Euro 2004 qualifying	Poland	0–1	Latvia	Warsaw, Poland
19:00		Report	Laizāns 30'	Stadium: Polish Army Stadium; Attendance: 11,814; Referee: Massimo Busacca (Switzerland)

16 October 2002 Friendly	Poland	2–0	New Zealand	Ostrowiec Świętokrzyski, Poland
19:15	Ratajczyk 52'; Kukiełka 87'	Report		Stadium: Miejski Stadion Sportowy "KSZO"; Attendance: 8,000; Referee: Bertrand Layec (France)

20 November 2002 Friendly	Denmark	2–0	Poland	Copenhagen, Denmark
19:15	Tomasson 22'; Røll 72'	Report		Stadium: Parken Stadium; Attendance: 15,364; Referee: Ruud Bossen (Netherlands)

==== 2003 ====
12 February 2003 Trofej Marjana Tournament	Croatia	0–0	Poland	Split, Croatia
18:00		Report		Stadium: Stadion Poljud; Attendance: 2,155; Referee: Franz-Xaver Wack (Germany)

14 February 2003 Trofej Marjana Tournament	Poland	3–0	Macedonia	Split, Croatia
20:00	Niedzielan 27'; Rasiak 38'; Lasocki 44'	Report		Stadium: Stadion Poljud; Attendance: 30; Referee: Edo Trivković (Croatia)

29 March 2003 UEFA Euro 2004 qualifying	Poland	0–0	Hungary	Chorzów, Poland
20:00		Report		Stadium: Silesian Stadium; Attendance: 42,200; Referee: Massimo de Santis (Italy)

2 April 2003 UEFA Euro 2004 qualifying	Poland	5–0	San Marino	Ostrowiec Świętokrzyski, Poland
20:00	Szymkowiak 5'; Kosowski 26'; Kuźba 54', 90'; Karwan 81'	Report		Stadium: Miejski Stadion Sportowy "KSZO"; Attendance: 8,000; Referee: Loizos Loizou (Cyprus)

30 April 2003 Friendly	Belgium	3–1	Poland	Brussels, Belgium
20:30	Sonck 28'; Buffel 55'; Soetaers 85'	Report	Krzynówek 80'	Stadium: King Baudouin Stadium; Attendance: 27,000; Referee: Dougie McDonald (Scotland)

6 June 2003 Friendly	Poland	3–0	Kazakhstan	Poznań, Poland
20:15	Wichniarek 2'; Dawidowski 51'; Krzynówek 82' (pen.)	Report		Stadium: Stadion Miejski; Attendance: 6,000; Referee: Knud Erik Fisker (Denmark)

11 June 2003 UEFA Euro 2004 qualifying	Sweden	3–0	Poland	Solna, Sweden
20:00	Svensson 16', 72'; Allbäck 43'	Report		Stadium: Råsunda Stadium; Attendance: 35,220; Referee: Gilles Veissiere (France)

20 August 2003 Friendly	Estonia	1–2	Poland	Tallinn, Estonia
20:30	Lemsalu 90+3'	Report	Sobolewski 51'; Wichniarek 90'	Stadium: A. Le Coq Arena; Attendance: 4,500; Referee: Stefan Johannesson (Sweden)

6 September 2003 UEFA Euro 2004 qualifying	Latvia	0–2	Poland	Riga, Latvia
20:30		Report	Szymkowiak 36'; Kłos 39'	Stadium: Skonto stadions Attendance: 6,500; Referee: Kyros Vassaras (Greece)

10 September 2003 UEFA Euro 2004 qualifying	Poland	0–2	Sweden	Chorzów, Poland
20:15		Report	Nilsson 3'; Mellberg 38'	Stadium: Silesian Stadium; Attendance: 18,500; Referee: Mike Riley (England)

11 October 2003 UEFA Euro 2004 qualifying	Hungary	1–2	Poland	Budapest, Hungary
17:00	Szabics 48'	Report	Niedzielan 10', 63'	Stadium: Stadium Puskás Ferenc; Attendance: 13,800; Referee: Manuel Mejuto González (Spain)

12 November 2003 Friendly	Poland	3–1	Italy	Warsaw, Poland
20:45	Bąk 6'; Kłos 17'; Krzynówek 85'	Report	Cassano 18'	Stadium: Polish Army Stadium; Attendance: 7,000; Referee: Tom Henning Øvrebø (Norway)

16 November 2003 Friendly	Poland	4–3	Serbia and Montenegro	Płock, Poland
17:15	Niedzielan 27'; Rasiak 30'; Kosowski 73'; Żurawski 82'	Report	Stanković 70'; Vukić 78'; Iliev 87'	Stadium: Kazimierz Górski Stadium; Attendance: 9,000; Referee: Michael Weiner (Germany)

11 December 2003 Friendly	Malta	0–4	Poland	Ta' Qali, Malta
17:00		Report	Bieniuk 54'; Mila 58'; Sikora 82'; Burkhardt 88'	Stadium: National Stadium; Attendance: 100; Referee: Giorgos Kasnaferis (Greece)

14 December 2003 Friendly	Lithuania	1–3	Poland	Ta' Qali, Malta
17:10	Butrimavičius 5'	Report	Rasiak 8'; Mila 11'; Jeleń 50'	Stadium: National Stadium; Attendance: 100; Referee: Joseph Attard (Malta)

==== 2004 ====
18 February 2004 Friendly	Poland	2–0	Slovenia	San Fernando, Spain
20:00	Mila 23'; Niedzielan 64'	Report		Stadium: Estadio Bahía Sur; Attendance: 150; Referee: Francisco López Barea (Spain)

21 February 2004 Friendly	Faroe Islands	0–6	Poland	San Fernando, Spain
17:15		Report	Kryszałowicz 9', 40', 41', 43'; Kłos 61'; Kukiełka 87'	Stadium: Estadio Bahía Sur; Attendance: 100; Referee: Abraham Dominguez Cascales (Spain)

31 March 2004 Friendly	Poland	0–1	United States	Płock, Poland
20:35		Report	Beasley 26'	Stadium: Kazimierz Górski Stadium; Attendance: 10,500; Referee: Tommy Skjerven (Norway)

28 April 2004 Friendly	Poland	0–0	Republic of Ireland	Bydgoszcz, Poland
18:00		Report		Stadium: Stadion Miejski im. Zdzisława Krzyszkowiaka; Attendance: 15,500; Referee: Serhiy Shebek (Ukraine)

29 May 2004 Friendly	Poland	1–0	Greece	Szczecin, Poland
20:00	Kapsis 17' (o.g.)	Report		Stadium: Stadion Miejski; Attendance: 17,000; Referee: Petteri Kari (Finland)

5 June 2004 Friendly	Sweden	3–1	Poland	Solna, Sweden
18:30	Larsson 42'; Jakobsson 54'; Allbäck 72'	Report	Gorawski 89'	Stadium: Råsunda Stadium; Attendance: 28,281; Referee: Alan Kelly (Ireland)

11 July 2004 Friendly	United States	1–1	Poland	Chicago, United States
18:00 UTC-4	Bocanegra 88'	Report	Włodarczyk 76'	Stadium: Soldier Field; Attendance: 39,529; Referee: Silviu Petrescu (Canada)

18 August 2004 Friendly	Poland	1–5	Denmark	Poznań, Poland
20:30	Żurawski 75'	Report	Madsen 23', 30', 90'; Gaardsøe 51'; Jensen 86'	Stadium: Stadion Miejski; Attendance: 4,500; Referee: Ivan Bebek (Croatia)

4 September 2004 2006 World Cup qualification	Northern Ireland	0–3	Poland	Belfast, Northern Ireland
15:00		(Report)	Żurawski 4'; Włodarczyk 36'; Krzynówek 56'	Stadium: Windsor Park; Attendance: 12,487; Referee: Jan Wegereef (Netherlands)

8 September 2004 2006 World Cup qualification	Poland	1–2	England	Chorzów, Poland
20:30	Żurawski 47'	(Report)	Defoe 36'; Głowacki 57' (o.g.)	Stadium: Stadion Śląski; Attendance: 30,000; Referee: Stefano Farina (Italy)

9 October 2004 2006 World Cup qualification	Austria	1–3	Poland	Vienna, Austria
20:30	Schopp 30'	(Report)	Kałużny 10'; Krzynówek 78'; Frankowski 90'	Stadium: Ernst-Happel-Stadion; Attendance: 46,100; Referee: Lucílio Batista (Portugal)

13 October 2004 2006 World Cup qualification	Wales	2–3	Poland	Cardiff, Wales
20:00	Earnshaw 56'; Hartson 90'	(Report)	Frankowski 72'; Żurawski 81'; Krzynówek 85'	Stadium: Millennium Stadium; Attendance: 56,685; Referee: Alain Sars (France)

17 November 2004 Friendly	France	0–0	Poland	Saint-Denis, France
21:00		Report		Stadium: Stade de France; Attendance: 50,480; Referee: Olegário Benquerença (Portugal)

==== 2005 ====
9 February 2005 Friendly	Poland	1–3	Belarus	Grodzisk Wielkopolski, Poland
20:00	Żurawski 51'	Report	A. Hleb 8'; V. Hleb 84'; Lavrik 90'	Stadium: Dyskobolia Stadium; Attendance: 3,600; Referee: Audrius Žuta (Lithuania)

26 March 2005 2006 World Cup qualification	Poland	8–0	Azerbaijan	Warsaw, Poland
18:00	Frankowski 12', 63', 66'; Hajiyev 16' (o.g.); Kosowski 40'; Krzynówek 72'; Saganowski 84', 90'	(Report)		Stadium: Polish Army Stadium; Attendance: 9,000; Referee: Nicolai Vollquartz (Denmark)

30 March 2005 2006 World Cup qualification	Poland	1–0	Northern Ireland	Warsaw, Poland
20:00	Żurawski 87'	(Report)		Stadium: Polish Army Stadium; Attendance: 13,515; Referee: Peter Fröjdfeldt (Sweden)

27 April 2005 Friendly	Mexico	1–1	Poland	Chicago, United States
18:30 UTC-5	Morales 51'	Report	Brożek 71'	Stadium: Soldier Field; Attendance: 54,427; Referee: Michael Kennedy (United States)

29 May 2005 Friendly	Poland	1–0	Albania	Szczecin, Poland
17:30	Żurawski 1'	Report		Stadium: Stadion Florian Krygier; Attendance: 14,000; Referee: Michael Weiner (Germany)

4 June 2005 2006 World Cup qualification	Azerbaijan	0–3	Poland	Baku, Azerbaijan
20:00		(Report)	Frankowski 28'; Kłos 57'; Żurawski 81'	Stadium: Tofiq Bahramov Republican Stadium; Attendance: 10,458; Referee: Alberto Undiano Mallenco (Spain)

15 August 2005 Valeriy Lobanovskyi Memorial Tournament	Poland	3–2	Serbia and Montenegro	Kyiv, Ukraine
16:15	Frankowski 30', 42' (pen.); Rasiak 37'	Report	Žigić 32'; Vidić 59'	Stadium: Valeriy Lobanovskyi Dynamo Stadium; Attendance: 4,500; Referee: Oleh Oriekhov (Ukraine)

17 August 2005 Valeriy Lobanovskyi Memorial Tournament	Israel	2–3	Poland	Kyiv, Poland
20:00	Badir 35'; Katan 48'	Report	Szymkowiak 19'; Rasiak 77', 89'	Stadium: Valeriy Lobanovskyi Dynamo Stadium; Attendance: 3,500; Referee: Milan Karadžić (Serbia and Montenegro)

3 September 2005 2006 World Cup qualification	Poland	3–2	Austria	Chorzów, Poland
20:30	Smolarek 13'; Kosowski 22'; Żurawski 67'	(Report)	Linz 61', 80'	Stadium: Stadion Śląski; Attendance: 40,000; Referee: Massimo De Santis (Italy)

7 September 2005 2006 World Cup qualification	Poland	1–0	Wales	Warsaw, Poland
20:30	Żurawski 52'	(Report)		Stadium: Polish Army Stadium; Attendance: 13,500; Referee: Claus Bo Larsen (Denmark)

7 October 2005 Friendly	Poland	3–2	Iceland	Warsaw, Poland
17:00	Krzynówek 25'; Baszczyński 57'; Smolarek 64'	Report	K. Sigurðsson 15'; H. Sigurðsson 38'	Stadium: Polish Army Stadium; Attendance: 7,500; Referee: Stanislav Sukhina (Russia)

12 October 2005 2006 World Cup qualification	England	2–1	Poland	Manchester, England
19:45	Owen 44'; Lampard 81'	(Report)	Frankowski 45+1'	Stadium: Old Trafford; Attendance: 65,467; Referee: Kim Milton Nielsen (Denmark)

13 November 2005 Friendly	Ecuador	0–3	Poland	Barcelona, Spain
16:45		Report	Kłos 2'; Smolarek 58'; Mila 90'	Stadium: Mini Estadi; Attendance: 9,000; Referee: Xavier Moreno Delgado (Spain)

16 November 2005 Friendly	Poland	3–1	Estonia	Ostrowiec Świętokrzyski, Poland
20:30	Lewandowski 8'; Mila 57'; Piechna 87'	Report	Teever 68'	Stadium: Miejski Stadion Sportowy "KSZO"; Attendance: 8,500; Referee: Jouni Hyytiä (Finland)

==== 2006 ====
1 March 2006 Friendly	United States	1–0	Poland	Kaiserslautern, Germany
20:00	Dempsey 49'	Report		Stadium: Fritz Walter Stadion; Attendance: 13,395; Referee: Thorsten Kinhöfer (Germany)

28 March 2006 Friendly	Saudi Arabia	1–2	Poland	Riyadh, Saudi Arabia
20:45	Tukar 27'	Report	Sosin 7', 63'	Stadium: Prince Faisal bin Fahd Sports City Stadium; Attendance: 2,000; Referee: Ali Al Mutlaq (Saudi Arabia)

2 May 2006 Friendly	Poland	0–1	Lithuania	Bełchatów, Poland
20:00		Report	Gedgaudas 14'	Stadium: GIEKSA Arena; Attendance: 4,500; Referee: Emil Božinovsk (Macedonia)

14 May 2006 Friendly	Poland	4–0	Faroe Islands	Wronki, Poland
17:25	Mila 15'; Rasiak 48', 84'; Saganowski 73'	Report		Stadium: Stadion Główny; Attendance: 4,000; Referee: Alex Prus (United States)

30 May 2006 Friendly	Poland	1–2	Colombia	Chorzów, Poland
18:00	Jeleń 90'	Report	Castrillón 22'; Viáfara 49'	Stadium: Stadion Śląski; Attendance: 40,000; Referee: Zsolt Szabó (Hungary)

3 June 2006 Friendly	Croatia	0–1	Poland	Wolfsburg, Germany
17:30		Report	Smolarek 54'	Stadium: Volkswagen Arena; Attendance: 8,000; Referee: Florian Meyer (Germany)

9 June 2006 2006 World Cup	Poland	0–2	Ecuador	Gelsenkirchen, Germany
21:00		Report	C. Tenorio 24'; Delgado 80'	Stadium: FIFA WM Stadion Gelsenkirchen; Attendance: 52,000; Referee: Toru Kamikawa (Japan)

14 June 2006 2006 World Cup	Germany	1–0	Poland	Dortmund, Germany
21:00	Neuville 90+1'	Report		Stadium: FIFA WM Stadion Dortmund; Attendance: 65,000; Referee: Luis Medina Cantalejo (Spain)

20 June 2006 2006 World Cup	Costa Rica	1–2	Poland	Hanover, Germany
16:00	Gómez 25'	Report	Bosacki 33', 65'	Stadium: FIFA WM Stadion Hannover; Attendance: 43,000; Referee: Shamsul Maidin (Singapore)

16 August 2006 Friendly	Denmark	2–0	Poland	Odense, Denmark
20:00	Bendtner 33'; Rommedahl 63'	Report		Stadium: Fionia Park; Attendance: 11,088; Referee: Tony Asumaa (Finland)

2 September 2006 UEFA Euro 2008 qualifying	Poland	1–3	Finland	Bydgoszcz, Poland
20:30	Garguła 89'	Report	Litmanen 54', 76' (pen.); Väyrynen 84'	Stadium: Zdzisław Krzyszkowiak; Attendance: 17,000; Referee: Laurent Duhamel (France)

6 September 2006 UEFA Euro 2008 qualifying	Poland	1–1	Serbia	Warsaw, Poland
20:30	Matusiak 30'	Report	Lazović 71'	Stadium: Stadion Wojska Polskiego; Attendance: 5,000; Referee: Graham Poll (England)

7 October 2006 UEFA Euro 2008 qualifying	Kazakhstan	0–1	Poland	Almaty, Kazakhstan
21:00		Report	Smolarek 52'	Stadium: Almaty Central Stadium; Attendance: 18,000; Referee: Edo Trivkovic (Croatia)

11 October 2006 UEFA Euro 2008 qualifying	Poland	2–1	Portugal	Chorzów, Poland
20:30	Smolarek 9', 18'	Report	Nuno Gomes 90+2'	Stadium: Silesian Stadium; Attendance: 40,000; Referee: Wolfgang Stark (Germany)

15 November 2006 UEFA Euro 2008 qualifying	Belgium	0–1	Poland	Brussels, Belgium
20:30		Report	Matusiak 19'	Stadium: King Baudouin Stadium; Attendance: 37,578; Referee: Stuart Dougal (Scotland)

6 December 2006 Friendly	United Arab Emirates	2–5	Poland	Abu Dhabi, United Arab Emirates
15:00	Khater 26'; Rashid 86' (pen.)	Report	Grzelak 8', 50'; Wasilewski 17'; Magdoń 87'; Matusiak 90'	Stadium: Zayed Sports City Stadium; Attendance: 1,000; Referee: Abdullah Al Hilali (Oman)

==== 2007 ====
3 February 2007 Friendly	Poland	4–0	Estonia	Jerez de la Frontera, Spain
20:00	Dudka 25'; Kokoszka 32'; Iwanski 70'; Golanski 76'	Report		Stadium: Estadio Municipal de Chapín; Attendance: 50; Referee: Daniel Bancalero Ruiz-Herrera (Spain)

7 February 2007 Friendly	Poland	2–2	Slovakia	Jerez de la Frontera, Spain
20:30	Żewłakow 48'; Matusiak 79'	Report	Jakubko 1'; Škrtel 45'	Stadium: Estadio Municipal de Chapín; Attendance: 200; Referee: Juan Perdigones (Spain)

24 March 2007 UEFA Euro 2008 qualifying	Poland	5–0	Azerbaijan	Warsaw, Poland
18:00	Bąk 3'; Dudka 6'; Łobodziński 34'; Krzynówek 58'; Kaźmierczak 84'	Report		Stadium: Stadion Wojska Polskiego; Attendance: 12,000; Referee: Kristinn Jakobsson (Iceland)

28 March 2007 UEFA Euro 2008 qualifying	Poland	1–0	Armenia	Kielce, Poland
20:30	Żurawski 26'	Report		Stadium: Kielce City Stadium; Attendance: 15,000; Referee: Alberto Undiano Mallenco (Spain)

2 June 2007 UEFA Euro 2008 qualifying	Azerbaijan	1–3	Poland	Baku, Azerbaijan
21:00	Subašić 6'	Report	Smolarek 63'; Krzynówek 66', 90'	Stadium: Tofiq Bahramov Republican Stadium; Attendance: 4,500; Referee: Costas Kapitanis (Cyprus)

6 June 2007 UEFA Euro 2008 qualifying	Armenia	1–0	Poland	Yerevan, Armenia
20:30	Hamlet Mkhitaryan 66'	Report		Stadium: Vazgen Sargsyan Republican Stadium; Attendance: 12,500; Referee: Cristian Balaj (Romania)

22 August 2007 Friendly	Russia	2–2	Poland	Moscow, Russia
19:00		Report		Stadium: Lokomotiv Stadium; Attendance: 15,000; Referee: Vladimír Hriňák (Slovakia)

8 September 2007 UEFA Euro 2008 qualifying	Portugal	2–2	Poland	Lisbon, Portugal
21:00	Maniche 50'; Ronaldo 73'	Report	Lewandowski 44'; Krzynówek 88'	Stadium: Estádio da Luz; Attendance: 55,000; Referee: Roberto Rosetti (Italy)

12 September 2007 UEFA Euro 2008 qualifying	Finland	0–0	Poland	Helsinki, Finland
19:00		Report		Stadium: Olympic Stadium; Attendance: 34,088; Referee: Herbert Fandel (Germany)

13 October 2007 UEFA Euro 2008 qualifying	Poland	3–1	Kazakhstan	Warsaw, Poland
20:30	Smolarek 56', 64', 65'	Report	Byakov 20'	Stadium: Stadion Wojska Polskiego; Attendance: 12,000; Referee: Espen Berntsen (Norway)

17 October 2007 Friendly	Poland	0–1	Hungary	Łódź, Poland
18:00		Report	Hajnal 80' (pen.)	Stadium: Stadion Widzewa; Attendance: 6,500; Referee: Claudio Circhetta (Switzerland)

17 November 2007 UEFA Euro 2008 qualifying	Poland	2–0	Belgium	Chorzów, Poland
20:30	Smolarek 45', 49'	Report		Stadium: Silesian Stadium; Attendance: 47,000; Referee: Claus Bo Larsen (Denmark)

21 November 2007 UEFA Euro 2008 qualifying	Serbia	2–2	Poland	Belgrade, Serbia
20:45	Žigić 68'; Lazović 70'	Report	Murawski 28'; Matusiak 46'	Stadium: Red Star Stadium; Attendance: 3,000; Referee: Massimo Busacca (Switzerland)

15 December 2007 Friendly	Bosnia and Herzegovina	0–1	Poland	Antalya, Turkey
18:00		Report		Stadium: World of Wonders Football Centre; Attendance: 200; Referee: Kuddusi Müftüoğlu (Turkey)

==== 2008 ====
2 February 2008 Cyprus Tournament	Finland	0–1	Poland	Paphos, Cyprus
16:00		Report	Kokoszka 6'	Stadium: Pafiako Stadium; Attendance: 300; Referee: Kostas Kapitanis (Cyprus)

6 February 2008 Cyprus Tournament	Czech Republic	0–2	Poland	Larnaca, Cyprus
20:30		Report	Łobodziński 6'; M. Lewandowski 29'	Stadium: GSZ Stadium; Attendance: 1,100; Referee: Marios Stamatis (Cyprus)

27 February 2008 Friendly	Poland	2–0	Estonia	Wronki, Poland
20:00	Matusiak 38'; Zahorski 72'	Report		Stadium: Wronki Stadion; Attendance: 4,500; Referee: Stanislav Todorov (Bulgaria)

26 March 2008 Friendly	Poland	0–3	United States	Kraków, Poland
20:30		Report	Bocanegra 12'; Onyewu 35'; Lewis 73'	Stadium: Stadion Miejski im. Henryka Reymana; Attendance: 21,000; Referee: Anders Hermansen (Denmark)

26 May 2008 Friendly	Poland	1–1	Macedonia	Reutlingen, Germany
20:30	Matusiak 83' (pen.)	Report	Maznov 45'	Stadium: Stadion an der Kreuzeiche; Attendance: 2,200; Referee: Felix Brych (Germany)

27 May 2008 Friendly	Albania	0–1	Poland	Reutlingen, Germany
20:30		Report	Żurawski 3'	Stadium: Stadion an der Kreuzeiche; Attendance: 2,900; Referee: Knut Kircher (Germany)

1 June 2008 Friendly	Poland	1–1	Denmark	Chorzów, Poland
16:00	Krzynówek 43'	Report	Vingaard 28'	Stadium: Stadion Śląski; Attendance: 40,000; Referee: Philippe Kalt (France)

8 June 2008 UEFA Euro 2008	Germany	2–0	Poland	Klagenfurt, Austria
20:45	Podolski 20', 72'			Stadium: Wörthersee Stadion; Attendance: 30,461; Referee: Tom Henning Øvrebø (Norway)

12 June 2008 UEFA Euro 2008	Austria	1–1	Poland	Vienna, Austria
20:45	Vastić 90+3' (pen.)		Guerreiro 30'	Stadium: Ernst-Happel-Stadion; Attendance: 51,428; Referee: Howard Webb (England)

16 June 2008 UEFA Euro 2008	Poland	0–1	Croatia	Klagenfurt, Austria
20:45			Klasnić 53'	Stadium: Wörthersee Stadion; Attendance: 30,461; Referee: Kyros Vassaras (Greece)

20 August 2008 Friendly	Ukraine	1–0	Poland	Lviv, Ukraine
18:00	Serhiy Kravchenko 45+2'	Report		Stadium: Ukraina Stadium; Attendance: 21,000; Referee: Karen Nalbandyan (Armenia)

6 September 2008 2010 World Cup qualification	Poland	1–1	Slovenia	Wrocław, Poland
17:00	Żewłakow 17' (pen.)		Dedić 35'	Stadium: Stadion Oporowska; Attendance: 7,300; Referee: Kristinn Jakobsson (Iceland)

10 September 2008 2010 World Cup qualification	San Marino	0–2	Poland	Serravalle, San Marino
20:30			Smolarek 36'; R. Lewandowski 66'	Stadium: Stadio Olimpico; Attendance: 2,374; Referee: Christoforos Zografos (Greece)

11 October 2008 2010 World Cup qualification	Poland	2–1	Czech Republic	Chorzów, Poland
20:30	Brożek 27'; Błaszczykowski 53'		Fenin 87'	Stadium: Silesian Stadium; Attendance: 38,293; Referee: Wolfgang Stark (Germany)

15 October 2008 2010 World Cup qualification	Slovakia	2–1	Poland	Bratislava, Slovakia
20:30	Šesták 85', 86'		Smolarek 70'	Stadium: Tehelné pole Attendance: 17,650; Referee: Bertrand Layec (France)

19 November 2008 Friendly	Republic of Ireland	2–3	Poland	Dublin, Republic of Ireland
21:00	Hunt 88' (pen.); Andrews 90'	Report	M. Lewandowski 3'; Guerreiro 47'; R. Lewandowski 89'	Stadium: Croke Park; Attendance: 50,566; Referee: Kristinn Jakobsson (Iceland)

14 December 2008 Friendly	Poland	1–0	Serbia	Aksu, Turkey
15:00	Boguski 53'	Report		Stadium: Mardan Sports Complex; Attendance: 100; Referee: Selçuk Dereli (Turkey)

==== 2009 ====
7 February 2009 Friendly	Lithuania	1–1	Poland	Loulé, Portugal
22:20	Klimavičius 26'	Report	Brożek 11'	Stadium: Estádio Algarve; Attendance: 100; Referee: Duarte Gomes (Portugal)

11 February 2009 Friendly	Wales	0–1	Poland	Vila Real de Santo António, Portugal
18:15		Report	Guerreiro 80'	Stadium: Estádio Municipal; Attendance: 487; Referee: Bruno Paixão (Portugal)

28 March 2009 2010 World Cup qualification	Northern Ireland	3–2	Poland	Belfast, Northern Ireland
17:15	Feeney 10'; Evans 47'; Żewłakow 61' (o.g.)		Jeleń 27'; Saganowski 90+1'	Stadium: Windsor Park; Attendance: 13,357; Referee: Martin Hansson (Sweden)

1 April 2009 2010 World Cup qualification	Poland	10–0	San Marino	Kielce, Poland
20:30	Boguski 1', 27'; Smolarek 18', 60', 72', 81'; R. Lewandowski 43'; Jeleń 51'; M. Lewandowski 63'; Saganowski 88'			Stadium: Arena Kielc; Attendance: 15,200; Referee: Aleksei Kulbakov (Belarus)

6 June 2009 Friendly	South Africa	1–0	Poland	Johannesburg, South Africa
15:00	Fanteni 6'	Report		Stadium: Orlando Stadium; Attendance: 8,000; Referee: Tendayi Bwanya (Zimbabwe)

9 June 2009 Friendly	Iraq	1–1	Poland	Cape Town, South Africa
17:15	Karim 53'	Report	Guerreiro 71'	Stadium: University of the Western Cape Stadium; Attendance: 2,000; Referee: Jerome Damon (South Africa)

12 August 2009 Friendly	Poland	2–0	Greece	Bydgoszcz, Poland
20:30	Obraniak 47', 79'	Report		Stadium: Stadion Miejski im. Zdzisława Krzyszkowiaka; Attendance: 19,000; Referee: Kenji Ogiya (Japan)

5 September 2009 2010 World Cup qualification	Poland	1–1	Northern Ireland	Chorzów, Poland
20:30	M. Lewandowski 80'		Lafferty 38'	Stadium: Silesian Stadium; Attendance: 38,914; Referee: Manuel Mejuto González (Spain)

9 September 2009 2010 World Cup qualification	Slovenia	3–0	Poland	Maribor, Slovenia
20:45	Dedić 13'; Novaković 44'; Birsa 62'			Stadium: Ljudski vrt Attendance: 10,226; Referee: William Collum (Scotland)

10 October 2009 2010 World Cup qualification	Czech Republic	2–0	Poland	Prague, Czech Republic
20:30	Necid 51'; Plašil 72'			Stadium: Generali Arena; Attendance: 14,010; Referee: Claus Bo Larsen (Denmark)

14 October 2009 2010 World Cup qualification	Poland	0–1	Slovakia	Chorzów, Poland
20:30			Gancarczyk 3' (o.g.)	Stadium: Stadion Śląski; Attendance: 4,500; Referee: Jonas Eriksson (Sweden)

14 November 2009 Friendly	Poland	0–1	Romania	Warsaw, Poland
17:00		Report	Niculae 59'	Stadium: Polish Army Stadium; Attendance: 5,000; Referee: Menashe Masiah (Israel)

18 November 2009 Friendly	Poland	1–0	Canada	Bydgoszcz, Poland
17:00	Rybus 18'	Report		Stadium: Stadion Miejski im. Zdzisława Krzyszkowiaka; Attendance: 10,400; Referee: Lars Christoffersen (Denmark)

==== 2010s ====
17 January 2010 2010 King's Cup	Denmark	3–1	Poland	Nakhon Ratchasima, Thailand
16:00 UTC+7	Rieks 22'; Rasmussen 48'; Bech 60'	Report	Peszko 26'	Stadium: 80th Birthday Stadium; Attendance: 3,000; Referee: Chaiya Mahapab (Thailand)

20 January 2010 2010 King's Cup	Thailand	1–3	Poland	Nakhon Ratchasima, Thailand
18:30 UTC+7	Therdsak 90' (pen.)	Report	Glik 43'; Małecki 52'; Robak 87'	Stadium: 80th Birthday Stadium; Attendance: 20,000; Referee: Odan Charles Mbaga (Tanzania)

23 January 2010 2010 King's Cup	Singapore	1–6	Poland	Nakhon Ratchasima, Thailand
16:00 UTC+7	Shi Jiayi 39'	Report	Lewandowski 26' (pen.), 37'; Iwański 45' (pen.); Brożek 69'; Małecki 80'; Nowak 88' (pen.)	Stadium: 80th Birthday Stadium; Attendance: 2,500; Referee: Caleb Amwayi Sikobe (Kenya)

3 March 2010 Friendly	Poland	2–0	Bulgaria	Warsaw, Poland
20:15	Błaszczykowski 42'; Lewandowski 62'	Report		Stadium: General Kazimierz Sosnkowski Municipal Stadium; Attendance: 6,800; Referee: Sascha Kever (Switzerland)

29 May 2010 Friendly	Poland	0–0	Finland	Kielce, Poland
17:00		Report		Stadium: Stadion Miejski; Attendance: 14,000; Referee: Marius Avram (Romania)

2 June 2010 Friendly	Poland	0–0	Serbia	Kufstein, Austria
20:30		Report		Stadium: Kufstein Arena; Attendance: 2,500; Referee: Dietmar Drabek (Austria)

8 June 2010 Friendly	Spain	6–0	Poland	Murcia, Spain
22:00	Dudka 12' (o.g.); Silva 14'; Alonso 50'; Fàbregas 58'; Torres 75'; Pedro 80'	Report		Stadium: Estadio Nueva Condomina; Attendance: 31,000; Referee: Michail Koukoulakis (Greece)

11 August 2010 Friendly	Poland	0–3	Cameroon	Szczecin, Poland
20:30		Report	Eto’o 30' (52.); Aboubakar 85'	Stadium: Stadion Miejski im. Floriana Krygiera; Attendance: 16,000; Referee: Tony Asumaa (Finland)

4 September 2010 Friendly	Poland	1–1	Ukraine	Łódź, Poland
17:00	Jeleń 42'	Report	Seleznyov 90+2'	Stadium: Stadion Widzewa; Attendance: 6,500; Referee: Ravshan Ermatov (Uzbekistan)

7 September 2010 Friendly	Poland	1–2	Australia	Kraków, Poland
20:30	Lewandowski 19'	Report	Holman 14'; Wilkshire 26'	Stadium: Wisła Kraków Stadium; Attendance: 16,000; Referee: Ivan Bebek (Croatia)

9 October 2010 Friendly	United States	2–2	Poland	Chicago, United States
19:00 UTC-5	Altidore 13'; Onyewu 52'	Report	Matuszczyk 29'; Błaszczykowski 73'	Stadium: Soldier Field; Attendance: 31,696; Referee: Steven DePiero (Canada)

12 October 2010 Friendly	Ecuador	2–2	Poland	Montréal, Canada
16:00 UTC-4	Benítez 32', 78'	Report	Smolarek 60'; Obraniak 70'	Stadium: Saputo Stadium; Attendance: 1,000; Referee: Mauricio Navarro (Canada)

17 November 2010 Friendly	Poland	3–1	Ivory Coast	Poznań, Poland
20:30	Lewandowski 19', 80'; Obraniak 66'	Report	Gervinho 45'	Stadium: Poznań Stadium; Attendance: 42,000; Referee: Masaaki Toma (Japan)

10 December 2010 Friendly	Bosnia and Herzegovina	2–2	Poland	Aksu, Turkey
20:30	Subašić 23'; Misimović 54' (pen.)		Brożek 7', 52'	Stadium: Mardan Sports Complex; Attendance: 100; Referee: Mustafa Öğretmenoğlu (Turkey)

==== 2011 ====
6 February 2011 Friendly	Moldova	0–1	Poland	Vila Real de Santo António, Portugal
20:30		Report	Plizga 15'	Stadium: Estádio Municipal; Attendance: 250; Referee: Ivo dos Anjos (Portugal)

9 February 2011 Friendly	Poland	1–0	Norway	Faro/Loulé, Portugal
20:30	Lewandowski 19'	Report		Stadium: Estádio Algarve; Attendance: 500; Referee: Ivo dos Anjos (Portugal)

25 March 2011 Friendly	Lithuania	2–0	Poland	Kaunas, Lithuania
21:30	Mikoliūnas 18'; Česnauskis 29'	Report		Stadium: Darius and Girėnas Stadium; Attendance: 4,500; Referee: Andris Treimanis (Latvia)

29 March 2011 Friendly	Greece	0–0	Poland	Piraeus, Greece
21:30		Report		Stadium: Karaiskakis Stadium; Attendance: 12,000; Referee: Martin Atkinson (England)

5 June 2011 Friendly	Poland	2–1	Argentina	Warsaw, Poland
17:00	Mierzejewski 26'; Brożek 67'	Report	Ruben 47'	Stadium: Polish Army Stadium; Attendance: 12,000; Referee: Manuel Gräfe (Germany)

9 June 2011 Friendly	Poland	0–1	France	Warsaw, Poland
21:00		Report	Jodłowiec 12' (o.g.)	Stadium: Polish Army Stadium; Attendance: 31,000; Referee: Björn Kuipers (Netherlands)

10 August 2011 Friendly	Poland	1–0	Georgia	Lubin, Poland
20:30	Błaszczykowski 36'	Report		Stadium: Dialog Arena; Attendance: 12,310; Referee: Andriy Shandor (Ukraine)

2 September 2011 Friendly	Poland	1–1	Mexico	Warsaw, Poland
20:30	Brożek 27'	Report	J. Hernandez 34'	Stadium: Pepsi Arena; Attendance: 18,000; Referee: Alexandru Deaconu (Romania)

6 September 2011 Friendly	Poland	2–2	Germany	Gdańsk, Poland
20:45	Lewandowski 55'; Błaszczykowski 90+1' (pen.)	Report	Kroos 68' (pen.); Cacau 90+4'	Stadium: PGE Arena; Attendance: 38,000; Referee: Daniele Orsato (Italy)

7 October 2011 Friendly	South Korea	2–2	Poland	Seoul, South Korea
20:00	Park Chu-young 65', 76'	Report	Lewandowski 29'; Błaszczykowski 82'	Stadium: Seoul World Cup Stadium; Attendance: 33,225; Referee: Nawaf Shukralla (Bahrain)

11 October 2011 Friendly	Belarus	0–2	Poland	Wiesbaden, Germany
20:30		Report	Błaszczykowski 31'; Lewandowski 70'	Stadium: Brita-Arena; Attendance: 5,116; Referee: Peter Sippel (Germany)

11 November 2011 Friendly	Poland	0–2	Italy	Wrocław, Poland
20:45		Report	Balotelli 30'; Pazzini 60'	Stadium: Stadion Miejski; Attendance: 44,000; Referee: Laurent Duhamel (France)

15 November 2011 Friendly	Poland	2–1	Hungary	Poznań, Poland
20:30	Brożek 37'; Vanczák 85' (o.g.)	Report	Priskin 79'	Stadium: Stadion Miejski; Attendance: 7,500; Referee: Hannes Kaasik (Estonia)

16 December 2011 Friendly	Bosnia and Herzegovina	0–1	Poland	Aksu, Turkey
21:30		Report	Sobota 26'	Stadium: Mardan Sports Complex; Attendance: 150; Referee: Yunus Yıldırım (Turkey)

==== 2012 ====
29 February 2012 Friendly	Poland	0–0	Portugal	Warsaw, Poland
20:45		Report		Stadium: National Stadium; Attendance: 53,179; Referee: Alon Yefet (Israel)

22 May 2012 Friendly	Latvia	0–1	Poland	Klagenfurt, Austria
20:45		Report	Sobiech 82'	Stadium: Wörthersee Stadion; Attendance: 734; Referee: Harald Lechner (Austria)

26 May 2012 Friendly	Poland	1–0	Slovakia	Klagenfurt, Austria
17:00	Perquis 30'	Report		Stadium: Wörthersee Stadion; Attendance: 2,100; Referee: Rene Eisner (Austria)

2 June 2012 Friendly	Poland	4–0	Andorra	Warsaw, Poland
17:00	Obraniak 13'; Lewandowski 37'; Błaszczykowski 39' (pen.); Wasilewski 78'	Report		Stadium: Pepsi Arena; Attendance: 26,000; Referee: Sébastien Delferière (Belgium)

8 June 2012 UEFA Euro 2012	Poland	1–1	Greece	Warsaw, Poland
18:00	Lewandowski 17'		Salpingidis 51'	Stadium: National Stadium; Attendance: 56,070; Referee: Carlos Velasco Carballo (Spain)

12 June 2012 UEFA Euro 2012	Poland	1–1	Russia	Warsaw, Poland
20:45	Błaszczykowski 57'		Dzagoev 37'	Stadium: National Stadium; Attendance: 55,920; Referee: Wolfgang Stark (Germany)

16 June 2012 UEFA Euro 2012	Czech Republic	1–0	Poland	Wrocław, Poland
20:45	Jiráček 72'			Stadium: Stadion Miejski; Attendance: 41,480; Referee: Craig Thomson (Scotland)

15 August 2012 Friendly	Estonia	1–0	Poland	Tallinn, Estonia
21:45	Vassiljev 90+2'	Report		Stadium: A. Le Coq Arena; Attendance: 5,312; Referee: Ken Henry Johnsen (Norway)

7 September 2012 2014 World Cup qualification	Montenegro	2–2	Poland	Podgorica, Montenegro
20:30	Drinčić 27'; Vučinić 45+2'		Błaszczykowski 6' (pen.); Mierzejewski 55'	Stadium: Stadion pod Goricom; Attendance: 11,420; Referee: Kristinn Jakobsson (Iceland)

11 September 2012 2014 World Cup qualification	Poland	2–0	Moldova	Wrocław, Poland
20:45	Błaszczykowski 33' (pen.); Wawrzyniak 81'			Stadium: Stadion Miejski; Attendance: 26,145; Referee: Ilias Spathas (Greece)

12 October 2012 Friendly	Poland	1–0	South Africa	Warsaw, Poland
20:45	Komorowski 82'	Report		Stadium: National Stadium; Attendance: 42,026; Referee: Radek Příhoda (Czech Republic)

17 October 2012 2014 World Cup qualification	Poland	1–1	England	Warsaw, Poland
17:00	Glik 70'		Rooney 31'	Stadium: National Stadium; Attendance: 47,000; Referee: Gianluca Rocchi (Italy)

14 November 2012 Friendly	Poland	1–3	Uruguay	Gdańsk, Poland
20:45	Obraniak 64'	Report	Glik 21' (o.g.); Cavani 34'; Suárez 66'	Stadium: PGE Arena; Attendance: 39,460; Referee: William Collum (Scotland)

14 December 2012 Friendly	Macedonia	1–4	Poland	Antalya, Turkey
18:15	Blazhevski 87'	Report	Milik 12'; Pawłowski 23'; Jędrzejczyk 63'; Sobota 79'	Stadium: Mardan Sports Complex; Attendance: 100; Referee: Hüseyin Göçek (Turkey)

==== 2013 ====
2 February 2013 Friendly	Poland	4–1	Romania	Málaga, Spain
20:45	Pawłowski 15'; Teodorczyk 24', 28'; Łukasik 33'	Report	Grozav 41'	Stadium: Estadio Ciudad de Málaga; Attendance: 800; Referee: Pérez Montero (Spain)

6 February 2013 Friendly	Republic of Ireland	2–0	Poland	Dublin, Ireland
19:45	Clark 35'; Hoolahan 76'	Report		Stadium: Aviva Stadium; Attendance: 43,112; Referee: Sébastien Delferiere (Belgium)

22 March 2013 2014 World Cup qualification	Poland	1–3	Ukraine	Warsaw, Poland
20:45	Piszczek 18'		Yarmolenko 2'; Husyev 7'; Zozulya 45'	Stadium: National Stadium; Attendance: 55,565; Referee: Pavel Královec (Czech Republic)

26 March 2013 2014 World Cup qualification	Poland	5–0	San Marino	Warsaw, Poland
20:45	Lewandowski 21' (pen.), 50' (pen.); Piszczek 28'; Teodorczyk 60'; Kosecki 90+2'			Stadium: National Stadium; Attendance: 43,008; Referee: Ken Henry Johnsen (Norway)

4 June 2013 Friendly	Poland	2–0	Liechtenstein	Kraków, Poland
21:00	Sobiech 53'; Rybus 72'	Report		Stadium: Stadion Cracovii; Attendance: 6,000; Referee: Sergei Karasev (Russia)

7 June 2013 2014 World Cup qualification	Moldova	1–1	Poland	Chișinău, Moldova
21:15	Sidorenco 36'		Błaszczykowski 6'	Stadium: Zimbru Stadium; Attendance: 8,726; Referee: Fernando Teixeira Vitienes (Spain)

14 August 2013 Friendly	Poland	3–2	Denmark	Gdańsk, Poland
20:45	Klich 5'; Sobota 59'; Zieliński 60'	Report	Eriksen 18'; Braithwaite 45+1'	Stadium: PGE Arena; Attendance: 34,952; Referee: Yudai Yamamoto (Japan)

6 September 2013 2014 World Cup qualification	Poland	1–1	Montenegro	Warsaw, Poland
20:45	Lewandowski 16'		Damjanović 11'	Stadium: National Stadium; Attendance: 45,652; Referee: Björn Kuipers (Netherlands)

10 September 2013 2014 World Cup qualification	San Marino	1–5	Poland	Serravalle, San Marino
20:45	Della Valle 22'		Zieliński 10', 66'; Błaszczykowski 23'; Sobota 34'; Mierzejewski 75'	Stadium: Stadio Olimpico; Attendance: 1,597; Referee: Marco Borg (Malta)

11 October 2013 2014 World Cup qualification	Ukraine	1–0	Poland	Kharkiv, Ukraine
21:00	Yarmolenko 64'			Stadium: Metalist Stadium; Attendance: 39,136; Referee: Jonas Eriksson (Sweden)

15 October 2013 2014 World Cup qualification	England	2–0	Poland	London, England
20:00	Rooney 41'; Gerrard 88'			Stadium: Wembley Stadium; Attendance: 85,186; Referee: Damir Skomina (Slovenia)

15 November 2013 Friendly	Poland	0–2	Slovakia	Wrocław, Poland
20:45		Report	Kucka 31'; Mak 39'	Stadium: Stadion Miejski; Attendance: 40,605; Referee: Marco Borg (Malta)

19 November 2013 Friendly	Poland	0–0	Republic of Ireland	Poznań, Poland
20:45		Report		Stadium: INEA Stadion; Attendance: 31,094; Referee: Richard Trutz (Slovakia)

==== 2014 ====
18 January 2014 Friendly	Norway	0–3	Poland	Abu Dhabi, United Arab Emirates
18:00		Report	Brzyski 21'; Kucharczyk 47'; Linetty 56'	Stadium: Zayed Sports City Stadium; Attendance: 250; Referee: Rami Alkaabi (Bahrain)

20 January 2014 Friendly	Moldova	0–1	Poland	Abu Dhabi, United Arab Emirates
20:15		Report	Brożek 10'	Stadium: Mohammed Bin Zayed Stadium; Attendance: 200; Referee: Saleh Al Hathlool (Saudi Arabia)

5 March 2014 Friendly	Poland	0–1	Scotland	Warsaw, Poland
20:45		Report	Brown 77'	Stadium: National Stadium; Attendance: 41,652; Referee: Alain Bieri (Switzerland)

13 May 2014 Friendly	Germany	0–0	Poland	Hamburg, Germany
20:45		Report		Stadium: Imtech Arena; Attendance: 37,569; Referee: David Fernández Borbalán (Spain)

6 June 2014 Friendly	Poland	2–1	Lithuania	Gdańsk, Poland
17:30	Milik 59'; Lewandowski 79' (pen.)	Report	Spalvis 44'	Stadium: Stadion Energa Gdańsk; Attendance: 33,074; Referee: Minoru Tōjō (Japan)

7 September 2014 UEFA Euro 2016 qualifying	Gibraltar	0–7	Poland	Faro/Loulé, Portugal
19:45		Report	Grosicki 11', 48'; Lewandowski 50', 53', 86', 90+2'; Szukała 58'	Stadium: Estádio Algarve; Attendance: 1,620; Referee: Stefan Johannesson (Sweden)

11 October 2014 UEFA Euro 2016 qualifying	Poland	2–0	Germany	Warsaw, Poland
20:45	Milik 51'; Mila 88'	Report		Stadium: National Stadium; Attendance: 56,934; Referee: Pedro Proença (Portugal)

14 October 2014 UEFA Euro 2016 qualifying	Poland	2–2	Scotland	Warsaw, Poland
20:45	Mączyński 11'; Milik 76'	Report	Maloney 18'; Naismith 57'	Stadium: National Stadium; Attendance: 55,197; Referee: Alberto Undiano Mallenco (Spain)

14 November 2014 UEFA Euro 2016 qualifying	Georgia	0–4	Poland	Tbilisi, Georgia
21:00		Report	Glik 51'; Krychowiak 71'; Mila 73'; Milik 90+2'	Stadium: Boris Paichadze Dinamo Arena; Attendance: 25,635; Referee: Paolo Tagliavento (Italy)

18 November 2014 Friendly	Poland	2–2	Switzerland	Wrocław, Poland
20:45	Jędrzejczyk 45+1'; Milik 61'	Report	Drmic 14'; Frei 87'	Stadium: Stadion Miejski; Attendance: 40,133; Referee: Kristinn Jakobsson (Iceland)

==== 2015 ====
29 March 2015 UEFA Euro 2016 qualifying	Republic of Ireland	1–1	Poland	Dublin, Republic of Ireland
19:45	Long 90+1'	Report	Peszko 26'	Stadium: Aviva Stadium; Attendance: 50,500; Referee: Jonas Eriksson (Sweden)

13 June 2015 UEFA Euro 2016 qualifying	Poland	4–0	Georgia	Warsaw, Poland
18:00	Milik 62'; Lewandowski 89', 90+2', 90+3'	Report		Stadium: National Stadium; Attendance: 56,512; Referee: Aleksei Kulbakov (Belarus)

16 June 2015 Friendly	Poland	0–0	Greece	Gdańsk, Poland
20:45		Report		Stadium: Stadion Energa Gdańsk; Attendance: 37,192; Referee: Alain Bieri (Switzerland)

4 September 2015 UEFA Euro 2016 qualifying	Germany	3–1	Poland	Frankfurt, Germany
20:45	Müller 12'; Götze 19', 82'	Report	Lewandowski 37'	Stadium: Commerzbank-Arena; Attendance: 48,500; Referee: Nicola Rizzoli (Italy)

7 September 2015 UEFA Euro 2016 qualifying	Poland	8–1	Gibraltar	Warsaw, Poland
20:45	Grosicki 8', 15'; Lewandowski 18', 29'; Milik 56', 72'; Błaszczykowski 59' (pen.); Kapustka 73'	Report	Gosling 87'	Stadium: National Stadium; Attendance: 27,763; Referee: Gediminas Mažeika (Lithuania)

8 October 2015 UEFA Euro 2016 qualifying	Scotland	2–2	Poland	Glasgow, Scotland
19:45	Ritchie 45'; S. Fletcher 62'	Report	Lewandowski 3', 90+4'	Stadium: Hampden Park; Attendance: 49,359; Referee: Viktor Kassai (Hungary)

11 October 2015 UEFA Euro 2016 qualifying	Poland	2–1	Republic of Ireland	Warsaw, Poland
20:45	Krychowiak 13'; Lewandowski 42'	Report	Walters 16' (pen.)	Stadium: National Stadium; Attendance: 57,497; Referee: Cüneyt Çakır (Turkey)

13 November 2015 Friendly	Poland	4–2	Iceland	Warsaw, Poland
20:45	Grosicki 52'; Kapustka 66'; Lewandowski 76', 79'	Report	Sigurðsson 4' (pen.); Finnbogason 69'	Stadium: National Stadium; Attendance: 56,207; Referee: Padraig Sutton (Ireland)

17 November 2015 Friendly	Poland	3–1	Czech Republic	Wrocław, Poland
20:45	Milik 3'; Jodłowiec 12'; Groscki 71'	Report	Krejčí 41'	Stadium: Stadion Miejski; Attendance: 40,793; Referee: Sándor Andó-Szabó (Hungary)

==== 2016 ====
23 March 2016 Friendly	Poland	1–0	Serbia	Poznań, Poland
20:45	Błaszczykowski 28'	Report		Stadium: INEA Stadion; Attendance: 38,271; Referee: Alexander Harkam (Austria)

26 March 2016 Friendly	Poland	5–0	Finland	Wrocław, Poland
17:30	Grosicki 18', 85'; Wszołek 20', 66'; Starzyński 32'	Report		Stadium: Stadion Miejski; Attendance: 42,068; Referee: Hiroyuki Kimura (Japan)

1 June 2016 Friendly	Poland	1–2	Netherlands	Gdańsk, Poland
20:45	Jędrzejczyk 60'	Report	Janssen 33'; Wijnaldum 76'	Stadium: Stadion Energa Gdańsk; Attendance: 40,392; Referee: Miroslav Zelinka (Czech Republic)

6 June 2016 Friendly	Poland	0–0	Lithuania	Kraków, Poland
18:00		Report		Stadium: Stadion Miejski im. Henryka Reymana; Attendance: 33,027; Referee: Filip Glova (Slovakia)

12 June 2016 UEFA Euro 2016	Poland	1–0	Northern Ireland	Nice, France
18:00	Milik 51'	Report		Stadium: Stade de Nice; Attendance: 33,742; Referee: Ovidiu Hațegan (Romania)

16 June 2016 UEFA Euro 2016	Germany	0–0	Poland	Saint-Denis, France
21:00		Report		Stadium: Stade de France; Attendance: 73,648; Referee: Björn Kuipers (Netherlands)

21 June 2016 UEFA Euro 2016	Ukraine	0–1	Poland	Marseille, France
18:00		Report	Błaszczykowski 54'	Stadium: Stade Vélodrome; Attendance: 58,874; Referee: Svein Oddvar Moen (Norway)

25 June 2016 UEFA Euro 2016 R16	Switzerland	1–1 (a.e.t.) (4–5 p)	Poland	Saint-Étienne, France
15:00	Shaqiri 82'	Report	Błaszczykowski 39'	Stadium: Stade Geoffroy-Guichard; Attendance: 38,842; Referee: Mark Clattenburg (England)
	Penalties
	Lichtsteiner (penalty scored); Xhaka (penalty missed); Shaqiri (penalty scored); Schär (penalty scored); Rodríguez (penalty scored)		(penalty scored) Lewandowski; (penalty scored) Milik; (penalty scored) Glik; (penalty scored) Błaszczykowski; (penalty scored) Krychowiak

30 June 2016 UEFA Euro 2016 QF	Poland	1–1 (a.e.t.) (3–5 p)	Portugal	Marseille, France
21:00	Lewandowski 2'	Report	Sanches 33'	Stadium: Stade Vélodrome; Attendance: 62,940; Referee: Felix Brych (Germany)
	Penalties
	Lewandowski (penalty scored); Milik (penalty scored); Glik (penalty scored); Błaszczykowski (penalty missed)		(penalty scored) Ronaldo; (penalty scored) Sanches; (penalty scored) Moutinho; (penalty scored) Nani; (penalty scored) Quaresma

4 September 2016 2018 World Cup qualification	Kazakhstan	2–2	Poland	Astana, Kazakhstan
22:00	Khizhnichenko 51', 58'	Report	Kapustka 9'; Lewandowski 35' (pen.)	Stadium: Astana Arena; Attendance: 19,905; Referee: Serdar Gözübüyük (Netherlands)

8 October 2016 2018 World Cup qualification	Poland	3–2	Denmark	Warsaw, Poland
20:45	Lewandowski 20', 36' (pen.), 48'	Report	Glik 49' (o.g.); Poulsen 69'	Stadium: National Stadium; Attendance: 56,811; Referee: Gianluca Rocchi (Italy)

11 October 2016 2018 World Cup qualification	Poland	2–1	Armenia	Warsaw, Poland
20:45	Mkoyan 48' (o.g.); Lewandowski 90+5'	Report	Pizzelli 50'	Stadium: National Stadium; Attendance: 44,786; Referee: Ivan Kružliak (Slovakia)

11 November 2016 2018 World Cup qualification	Romania	0–3	Poland	Bucharest, Romania
21:45		Report	Grosicki 11'; Lewandowski 83', 90+1' (pen.)	Stadium: Arena Națională; Attendance: 48,531; Referee: Damir Skomina (Slovenia)

14 November 2016 Friendly	Poland	1–1	Slovenia	Wrocław, Poland
20:45	Teodorczyk 79'	Report	Mevlja 24'	Stadium: Stadion Miejski; Attendance: 40,119; Referee: Björn Kuipers (Netherlands)

==== 2017 ====
26 March 2017 2018 World Cup qualification	Montenegro	1–2	Poland	Podgorica, Montenegro
20:45	Mugoša 63'	Report	Lewandowski 40'; Piszczek 82'	Stadium: City Stadium; Attendance: 10,439; Referee: Viktor Kassai (Hungary)

10 June 2017 2018 World Cup qualification	Poland	3–1	Romania	Warsaw, Poland
20:45	Lewandowski 29' (pen.), 57', 62' (pen.)	Report	Stancu 77'	Stadium: National Stadium; Attendance: 57,128; Referee: Ruddy Buquet (France)

1 September 2017 2018 World Cup qualification	Denmark	4–0	Poland	Copenhagen, Denmark
20:45	Delaney 15'; Cornelius 42'; Jørgensen 59'; Eriksen 80'	Report		Stadium: Parken Stadium; Attendance: 34,505; Referee: Milorad Mažić (Serbia)

4 September 2017 2018 World Cup qualification	Poland	3–0	Kazakhstan	Warsaw, Poland
	Milik 11'; Glik 74'; Lewandowski 86' (pen.)	Report		Stadium: National Stadium; Attendance: 56,963; Referee: Andris Treimanis (Latvia)

5 October 2017 2018 World Cup qualification	Armenia	1–6	Poland	Yerevan, Armenia
20:00	Hambardzumyan 39'	Report	Grosicki 2'; Lewandowski 18', 25', 64'; Błaszczykowski 58'; Wolski 89'	Stadium: Vazgen Sargsyan Republican Stadium; Attendance: 5,478; Referee: Matej Jug (Slovenia)

8 October 2017 2018 World Cup qualification	Poland	4–2	Montenegro	Warsaw, Poland
18:00	Mączyński 6'; Grosicki 16'; Lewandowski 86'; Stojković 89' (o.g.)	Report	Mugoša 78'; Tomašević 83'	Stadium: National Stadium; Attendance: 57,538; Referee: Daniele Orsato (Italy)

10 November 2017 Friendly	Poland	0–0	Uruguay	Warsaw, Poland
20:45		Report		Stadium: National Stadium; Attendance: 56,147; Referee: István Vad (Hungary)

13 November 2017 Friendly	Poland	0–1	Mexico	Gdańsk, Poland
20:45		Report	Jiménez 13'	Stadium: Stadion Energa Gdańsk; Attendance: 32,736; Referee: Oliver Drachta (Austria)

==== 2018 ====
23 March 2018 Friendly	Poland	0–1	Nigeria	Wrocław, Poland
20:45		Report	Moses 61' (pen.)	Stadium: Stadion Miejski; Attendance: 41,208; Referee: Michael Oliver (England)

27 March 2018 Friendly	Poland	3–2	South Korea	Chorzów, Poland
20:45	Lewandowski 32'; Grosicki 45'; Zieliński 90+2'	Report	Lee Chang-min 85'; Hwang Hee-chan 87'	Stadium: Silesian Stadium; Attendance: 53,129; Referee: Tore Hansen (Norway)

8 June 2018 Friendly	Poland	2–2	Chile	Poznań, Poland
20:45	Lewandowski 30'; Zieliński 34'	Report	Valdes 39'; Albornoz 56'	Stadium: Stadion Miejski; Attendance: 41,216; Referee: Paolo Mazzoleni (Italy)

12 June 2018 Friendly	Poland	4–0	Lithuania	Warsaw, Poland
18:00	Lewandowski 19', 32'; Kownacki 71'; Błaszczykowski 82' (pen.)	Report		Stadium: National Stadium; Attendance: 53,803; Referee: Kevin Blom (Netherlands)

19 June 2018 2018 World Cup	Poland	1–2	Senegal	Moscow, Russia
18:00	Krychowiak 86'	Report	Cionek 37' (o.g.); Niang 60'	Stadium: Otkritie Arena; Attendance: 44,190; Referee: Nawaf Shukralla (Bahrain)

24 June 2018 2018 World Cup	Poland	0–3	Colombia	Kazan, Russia
21:00		Report	Mina 40'; Falcao 70'; Ju. Cuadrado 75'	Stadium: Kazan Arena; Attendance: 42,873; Referee: César Arturo Ramos (Mexico)

28 June 2018 2018 World Cup	Japan	0–1	Poland	Volgograd, Russia
17:00		Report	Bednarek 59'	Stadium: Volgograd Arena; Attendance: 42,189; Referee: Janny Sikazwe (Zambia)

7 September 2018 Nations League	Italy	1–1	Poland	Bologna, Italy
20:45	Jorginho 78' (pen.)	Report	Zieliński 40'	Stadium: Stadio Renato Dall'Ara; Attendance: 24,000; Referee: Felix Zwayer (Germany)

11 September 2018 Friendly	Poland	1–1	Republic of Ireland	Wrocław, Poland
20:45	Klich 87'	Report	O'Brien 53'	Stadium: Stadion Miejski; Attendance: 25,455; Referee: Boris Marhefka (Slovakia)

11 October 2018 Nations League	Poland	2–3	Portugal	Chorzów, Poland
20:45	Piątek 18'; Błaszczykowski 77'	Report	A. Silva 32'; Glik 43' (o.g.); B. Silva 52'	Stadium: Silesian Stadium; Attendance: 48,783; Referee: Carlos del Cerro Grande (Spain)

14 October 2018 Nations League	Poland	0–1	Italy	Chorzów, Poland
20:45		Report	Biraghi 90+2'	Stadium: Silesian Stadium; Attendance: 41,692; Referee: Damir Skomina (Slovenia)

15 November 2018 Friendly	Poland	0–1	Czech Republic	Gdańsk, Poland
18:00		Report	Jankto 52'	Stadium: Stadion Energa Gdańsk; Attendance: 34,783; Referee: Stephan Klossner (Switzerland)

20 November 2018 Nations League	Portugal	1–1	Poland	Guimarães, Portugal
19:45	A. Silva 34'	Report	Milik 66' (pen.)	Stadium: Estádio D. Afonso Henriques; Attendance: 29,917; Referee: Sergei Karasev (Russia)

==== 2019 ====
21 March 2019 UEFA Euro 2020 qualifying	Austria	0–1	Poland	Vienna, Austria
20:45		Report	Piątek 69'	Stadium: Ernst-Happel-Stadion; Attendance: 40,400; Referee: Anastasios Sidiropoulos (Greece)

24 March 2019 UEFA Euro 2020 qualifying	Poland	2–0	Latvia	Warsaw, Poland
20:45	Lewandowski 76'; Glik 84'	Report		Stadium: National Stadium; Attendance: 51,112; Referee: Aliyar Aghayev (Azerbaijan)

7 June 2019 UEFA Euro 2020 qualifying	North Macedonia	0–1	Poland	Skopje, North Macedonia
20:45		Report	Piątek 47'	Stadium: Toše Proeski Arena; Attendance: 22,000; Referee: Gianluca Rocchi (Italy)

10 June 2019 UEFA Euro 2020 qualifying	Poland	4–0	Israel	Warsaw, Poland
21:45	Piątek 35'; Lewandowski 56' (pen.); Grosicki 59'; Kądzior 84'	Report		Stadium: National Stadium; Attendance: 57,229; Referee: Tobias Stieler (Germany)

6 September 2019 UEFA Euro 2020 qualifying	Slovenia	2–0	Poland	Ljubljana, Slovenia
20:45	Struna 35'; Šporar 65'	Report		Stadium: Stožice Stadium; Attendance: 15,231; Referee: Sergei Karasev (Russia)

9 September 2019 UEFA Euro 2020 qualifying	Poland	0–0	Austria	Warsaw, Poland
20:45		Report		Stadium: National Stadium; Attendance: 56,788; Referee: Viktor Kassai (Hungary)

10 October 2019 UEFA Euro 2020 qualifying	Latvia	0–3	Poland	Riga, Latvia
21:45		Report	Lewandowski 9', 13', 76'	Stadium: Daugava Stadium; Attendance: 7,107; Referee: Halis Özkahya (Turkey)

13 October 2019 UEFA Euro 2020 qualifying	Poland	2–0	North Macedonia	Warsaw, Poland
20:45	Frankowski 74'; Milik 80'	Report		Stadium: National Stadium; Attendance: 52,894; Referee: Antonio Mateu Lahoz (Spain)

16 November 2019 UEFA Euro 2020 qualifying	Israel	1–2	Poland	Jerusalem, Israel
21:45	Dabour 88'	Report	Krychowiak 4'; Piątek 54'	Stadium: Teddy Stadium; Attendance: 16,700; Referee: Mattias Gestranius (Finland)

19 November 2019 UEFA Euro 2020 qualifying	Poland	3–2	Slovenia	Warsaw, Poland
20:45	Szymański 3'; Lewandowski 54'; Góralski 81'	Report	Matavž 14'; Iličić 61'	Stadium: National Stadium; Attendance: 53,946; Referee: Daniel Siebert (Germany)
