= 2002 FIFA World Cup qualification – UEFA Group 5 =

Football tournament qualification stage

The six teams in this group played against each other on a home-and-away basis. The group winner (Poland) qualified for the 17th FIFA World Cup held in South Korea and Japan. The runner-up Ukraine advanced to the UEFA Play-off and played against Germany. Poland led the group from the start, with six wins and two draws out of eight, with Ukraine in second place: however, with group victory already sewn up, they unexpectedly went down 4–1 to Belarus, which gave the Belarusians a chance of overtaking Ukraine if they won their final match against Wales and Ukraine failed to win in Poland. However, Belarus failed to reproduce the form of their previous match, and lost 1–0 to hand Wales their only victory of the campaign, Ukraine thus finishing second regardless of their result in Poland (a 1–1 draw).

== Standings ==
Pos	Team	Pld	W	D	L	GF	GA	GD	Pts	Qualification	Poland national football team	Ukraine national football team	Belarus national football team	Norway national football team	Wales national football team	Armenia national football team
1	Poland	10	6	3	1	21	11	+10	21	Qualification to 2002 FIFA World Cup	—	1–1	3–1	3–0	0–0	4–0
2	Ukraine	10	4	5	1	13	8	+5	17	Advance to UEFA play-offs	1–3	—	0–0	0–0	1–1	3–0
3	Belarus	10	4	3	3	12	11	+1	15		4–1	0–2	—	2–1	2–1	2–1
4	Norway	10	2	4	4	12	14	−2	10		2–3	0–1	1–1	—	3–2	0–0
5	Wales	10	1	6	3	10	12	−2	9		1–2	1–1	1–0	1–1	—	0–0
6	Armenia	10	0	5	5	7	19	−12	5		1–1	2–3	0–0	1–4	2–2	—

== Matches ==
2 September 2000

Ukraine	1–3	Poland
Shevchenko 11'	Report	Olisadebe 2', 31'; Kałużny 56'

Olimpiyskyi National Sports Complex, Kyiv
Attendance: 52,000
Referee: José María García-Aranda (Spain)
2 September 2000

Belarus	2–1	Wales
Khatskevich 39'; Belkevich 56'	Report	Speed 90+3'

Dinamo Stadium, Minsk
Attendance: 32,000
Referee: Alfredo Trentalange (Italy)
2 September 2000

Norway	0–0	Armenia
	Report

Ullevaal Stadion, Oslo
Attendance: 19,201
Referee: William Young (Scotland)

7 October 2000

Poland	3–1	Belarus
Kałużny 24', 62', 73'	Report	Ryndzyuk 37'

Stadion Widzewa, Łódź
Attendance: 7,638
Referee: Anders Frisk (Sweden)
7 October 2000

Armenia	2–3	Ukraine
Arthur Petrosyan 17', 44'	Report	Shevchenko 45', 59'; Husin 55'

Hanrapetakan Marzadasht, Yerevan
Attendance: 14,000
Referee: Jorn Larsen (Denmark)
7 October 2000

Wales	1–1	Norway
Blake 60'	Report	Helstad 80'

Millennium Stadium, Cardiff
Attendance: 51,100
Referee: Hartmut Strampe (Germany)

11 October 2000

Poland	0–0	Wales
	Report

Stadion Wojska Polskiego, Warsaw
Attendance: 10,067
Referee: Lucílio Batista (Portugal)
11 October 2000

Norway	0–1	Ukraine
	Report	Shevchenko 51'

Ullevaal Stadion, Oslo
Attendance: 23,612
Referee: Urs Meier (Switzerland)
11 October 2000

Belarus	2–1	Armenia
Khatskevich 23'; Ryndzyuk 33'	Report	Khojoyan 50'

Dinamo Stadium, Minsk
Attendance: 21,700
Referee: Sorin Corpodean (Romania)

24 March 2001

Norway	2–3	Poland
Carew 59'; Solskjær 67'	Report	Olisadebe 23', 30'; Karwan 81'

Ullevaal Stadion, Oslo
Attendance: 15,077
Referee: Stuart Dougal (Scotland)
24 March 2001

Ukraine	0–0	Belarus
	Report

Olimpiyskyi National Sports Complex, Kyiv
Attendance: 75,000
Referee: Juan Fernández Marín (Spain)
24 March 2001

Armenia	2–2	Wales
Ar. Minasyan 39'; A. Movsisyan 67'	Report	Hartson 40', 48'

Hanrapetakan Marzadasht, Yerevan
Attendance: 7,000
Referee: Georgios Kasnaferis (Greece)

28 March 2001

Poland	4–0	Armenia
Michał Żewłakow 15' (pen.); Olisadebe 42'; Marcin Żewłakow 81'; Karwan 88'	Report

Stadion Wojska Polskiego, Warsaw
Attendance: 10,320
Referee: Eric Poulat (France)
28 March 2001

Wales	1–1	Ukraine
Hartson 12'	Report	Shevchenko 51'

Millennium Stadium, Cardiff
Attendance: 48,014
Referee: Eric Romain (Belgium)
28 March 2001

Belarus	2–1	Norway
Khatskevich 19'; Vasilyuk 90+1'	Report	Solskjær 68'

Dinamo Stadium, Minsk
Attendance: 39,000
Referee: Kyros Vassaras (Greece)

2 June 2001

Wales	1–2	Poland
Blake 14'	Report	Olisadebe 32'; Kryszałowicz 72'

Millennium Stadium, Cardiff
Attendance: 48,500
Referee: Erol Ersoy (Turkey)
2 June 2001

Ukraine	0–0	Norway
	Report

Olimpiyskyi National Sports Complex, Kyiv
Attendance: 42,000
Referee: Goran Maric (Croatia)
2 June 2001

Armenia	0–0	Belarus
	Report

Hanrapetakan Marzadasht, Yerevan
Attendance: 6,400
Referee: Anton Guenov (Bulgaria)

6 June 2001

Armenia	1–1	Poland
Arthur Petrosyan 11'	Report	Kałużny 4'

Hanrapetakan Marzadasht, Yerevan
Attendance: 5,500
Referee: Eric Romain (Belgium)
6 June 2001

Ukraine	1–1	Wales
Zubov 44'	Report	Pembridge 74'

Olimpiyskyi National Sports Complex, Kyiv
Attendance: 33,000
Referee: Joaquim Paulo Gomes (Portugal)
6 June 2001

Norway	1–1	Belarus
Carew 80'	Report	Belkevich 23'

Ullevaal Stadion, Oslo
Attendance: 17,164
Referee: Miroslav Radoman (FR Yugoslavia)

1 September 2001

Poland	3–0	Norway
Kryszałowicz 45+1'; Olisadebe 77'; Marcin Żewłakow 88'	Report

Stadion Śląski, Chorzów
Attendance: 40,000
Referee: Miroslav Liba (Czech Republic)
1 September 2001

Belarus	0–2	Ukraine
	Report	Shevchenko 45', 57'

Dinamo Stadium, Minsk
Attendance: 40,000
Referee: Alain Sars (France)
1 September 2001

Wales	0–0	Armenia
	Report

Millennium Stadium, Cardiff
Attendance: 20,000
Referee: Joseph Attard (Malta)

5 September 2001

Belarus	4–1	Poland
Vasilyuk 7', 46', 52', 61'	Report	Marcin Żewłakow 78'

Dinamo Stadium, Minsk
Attendance: 24,302
Referee: Konrad Plautz (Austria)
5 September 2001

Ukraine	3–0	Armenia
Shevchenko 11'; Vorobey 85', 90'	Report

Stadion Ukrajina, Lviv
Attendance: 28,000
Referee: Loizos Loizou (Cyprus)
5 September 2001

Norway	3–2	Wales
R. Johnsen 17'; Carew 68'; F. Johnsen 87'	Report	Savage 10'; Bellamy 28'

Ullevaal Stadion, Oslo
Attendance: 18,211
Referee: Fritz Stuchlik (Austria)

6 October 2001

Poland	1–1	Ukraine
Olisadebe 40'	Report	Shevchenko 81'

Stadion Śląski, Chorzów
Attendance: 20,900
Referee: Hugh Dallas (Scotland)
6 October 2001

Wales	1–0	Belarus
Hartson 47'	Report

Millennium Stadium, Cardiff
Attendance: 10,201
Referee: Pasquale Rodomonti (Italy)
6 October 2001

Armenia	1–4	Norway
H. Hakobyan 72'	Report	Borgersen 49', 80'; Carew 70', 89'

Hanrapetakan Marzadasht, Yerevan
Attendance: 9,000
Referee: Andreas Schluchter (Switzerland)

== Goalscorers ==
There were 75 goals scored in 30 matches, for an average of 2.5 goals per match.

9 goals

- (Ukraine) Andriy Shevchenko

8 goals

- (Poland) Emmanuel Olisadebe

5 goals

- (Belarus) Raman Vasilyuk
- (Norway) John Carew
- (Poland) Radosław Kałużny

4 goals

- (Wales) John Hartson

3 goals

- (Armenia) Arthur Petrosyan
- (Belarus) Alexander Khatskevich
- (Poland) Marcin Żewłakow

2 goals

- (Belarus) Valentin Belkevich
- (Belarus) Mikalay Ryndzyuk
- (Norway) Bård Borgersen
- (Norway) Ole Gunnar Solskjær
- (Poland) Bartosz Karwan
- (Poland) Paweł Kryszałowicz
- (Ukraine) Andriy Vorobei
- (Wales) Nathan Blake

1 goal

- (Armenia) Hayk Hakobyan
- (Armenia) Felix Khojoyan
- (Armenia) Artak Minasyan
- (Armenia) Andrey Movsisyan
- (Norway) Thorstein Helstad
- (Norway) Frode Johnsen
- (Norway) Ronny Johnsen
- (Poland) Michał Żewłakow
- (Ukraine) Andriy Husin
- (Ukraine) Hennadiy Zubov
- (Wales) Craig Bellamy
- (Wales) Mark Pembridge
- (Wales) Robbie Savage
- (Wales) Gary Speed
