= 2002 FIFA World Cup Group D =

Football tournament group stage

Group D of the 2002 FIFA World Cup took place between 4 and 14 June 2002. South Korea won the group, and advanced to the second round, along with the United States. Portugal and Poland failed to advance.

== Standings ==
Pos	Team	Pld	W	D	L	GF	GA	GD	Pts	Qualification
1	South Korea (H)	3	2	1	0	4	1	+3	7	Advance to knockout stage
2	United States	3	1	1	1	5	6	−1	4	Advance to knockout stage
3	Portugal	3	1	0	2	6	4	+2	3	
4	Poland	3	1	0	2	3	7	−4	3	

Source: FIFA
Rules for classification: Tie-breaking criteria
(H) Hosts
- South Korea advanced to play Italy (runner-up of Group G) in the round of 16.
- United States advanced to play Mexico (winner of Group G) in the round of 16.

== Matches ==
All times local (UTC+9)

=== South Korea vs Poland ===
4 June 2002
20:30

South Korea	2–0	Poland
Hwang Sun-hong 26'; Yoo Sang-chul 53'

Busan Asiad Main Stadium, Busan
Attendance: 48,760
Referee: Óscar Ruiz (Colombia)

South Korea	Poland

GK	1	Lee Woon-jae
CB	4	Choi Jin-cheul
CB	20	Hong Myung-bo (c)
CB	7	Kim Tae-young
RM	22	Song Chong-gug
CM	6	Yoo Sang-chul		(substituted off) 61'
CM	5	Kim Nam-il
LM	13	Lee Eul-yong
RF	21	Park Ji-sung	(yellow card) 70'
CF	18	Hwang Sun-hong		(substituted off) 50'
LF	9	Seol Ki-hyeon		(substituted off) 89'
Substitutions:
FW	19	Ahn Jung-hwan		(substituted on) 50'
MF	14	Lee Chun-soo		(substituted on) 61'
FW	16	Cha Du-ri	(yellow card) 90'	(substituted on) 89'
Manager:
(Netherlands) Guus Hiddink

GK	1	Jerzy Dudek
RB	6	Tomasz Hajto	(yellow card) 79'
CB	20	Jacek Bąk		(substituted off) 50'
CB	15	Tomasz Wałdoch (c)
LB	4	Michał Żewłakow
RM	21	Marek Koźmiński
CM	10	Radosław Kałużny		(substituted off) 64'
CM	7	Piotr Świerczewski	(yellow card) 84'
LM	18	Jacek Krzynówek	(yellow card) 31'
CF	11	Emmanuel Olisadebe
CF	19	Maciej Żurawski		(substituted off) 46'
Substitutions:
FW	9	Paweł Kryszałowicz		(substituted on) 46'
DF	2	Tomasz Kłos		(substituted on) 50'
FW	14	Marcin Żewłakow		(substituted on) 64'
Manager:
Jerzy Engel

Man of the Match:
Yoo Sang-chul (South Korea)

Assistant referees:
Elise Doriri (Vanuatu)
Leif Lindberg (Sweden)
Fourth official:
Ángel Sánchez (Argentina)

=== United States vs Portugal ===
5 June 2002
18:00

United States	3–2	Portugal
O'Brien 4'; J. Costa 29' (o.g.); McBride 36'		Beto 39'; Agoos 71' (o.g.)

Suwon World Cup Stadium, Suwon
Attendance: 37,306
Referee: Byron Moreno (Ecuador)

United States	Portugal

GK	1	Brad Friedel
RB	22	Tony Sanneh
CB	23	Eddie Pope		(substituted off) 80'
CB	12	Jeff Agoos
LB	2	Frankie Hejduk
RM	8	Earnie Stewart (c)		(substituted off) 46'
CM	5	John O'Brien
CM	4	Pablo Mastroeni
LM	17	DaMarcus Beasley	(yellow card) 90+2'
CF	20	Brian McBride
CF	21	Landon Donovan		(substituted off) 75'
Substitutions:
MF	13	Cobi Jones		(substituted on) 46'
FW	9	Joe-Max Moore		(substituted on) 75'
DF	16	Carlos Llamosa		(substituted on) 80'
Manager:
Bruce Arena

GK	1	Vítor Baía
RB	22	Beto	(yellow card) 34'
CB	5	Fernando Couto (c)
CB	2	Jorge Costa		(substituted off) 74'
LB	23	Rui Jorge		(substituted off) 69'
RM	11	Sérgio Conceição
CM	10	Rui Costa		(substituted off) 80'
CM	20	Petit	(yellow card) 52'
LM	7	Luís Figo
SS	8	João Pinto
CF	9	Pauleta
Substitutions:
MF	17	Paulo Bento		(substituted on) 69'
DF	13	Jorge Andrade		(substituted on) 74'
FW	21	Nuno Gomes		(substituted on) 80'
Manager:
António Oliveira

Man of the Match:
Brian McBride (United States)

Assistant referees:
Bomer Fierro (Ecuador)
Awni Hassouneh (Jordan)
Fourth official:
Saad Mane (Kuwait)

=== South Korea vs United States ===
10 June 2002
15:30

South Korea	1–1	United States
Ahn Jung-hwan 78'		Mathis 24'

Daegu World Cup Stadium, Daegu
Attendance: 60,778
Referee: Urs Meier (Switzerland)

South Korea	United States

GK	1	Lee Woon-jae
CB	4	Choi Jin-cheul
CB	20	Hong Myung-bo (c)	(yellow card) 80'
CB	7	Kim Tae-young
RM	22	Song Chong-gug
CM	6	Yoo Sang-chul		(substituted off) 69'
CM	5	Kim Nam-il
LM	13	Lee Eul-yong
RF	21	Park Ji-sung		(substituted off) 38'
CF	18	Hwang Sun-hong		(substituted off) 56'
LF	9	Seol Ki-hyeon
Substitutions:
MF	14	Lee Chun-soo		(substituted on) 38'
FW	19	Ahn Jung-hwan		(substituted on) 56'
FW	11	Choi Yong-soo		(substituted on) 69'
Manager:
(Netherlands) Guus Hiddink

GK	1	Brad Friedel
RB	22	Tony Sanneh
CB	23	Eddie Pope
CB	12	Jeff Agoos	(yellow card) 39'
LB	2	Frankie Hejduk	(yellow card) 30'
RM	21	Landon Donovan
CM	10	Claudio Reyna (c)
CM	5	John O'Brien
LM	17	DaMarcus Beasley		(substituted off) 75'
CF	11	Clint Mathis		(substituted off) 82'
CF	20	Brian McBride
Substitutions:
MF	7	Eddie Lewis		(substituted on) 75'
FW	15	Josh Wolff		(substituted on) 82'
Manager:
Bruce Arena

Man of the Match:
Brad Friedel (United States)

Assistant referees:
Egon Bereuter (Austria)
Ali Tomusange (Uganda)
Fourth official:
Gamal Al-Ghandour (Egypt)

=== Portugal vs Poland ===
10 June 2002
20:30

Portugal	4–0	Poland
Pauleta 14', 65', 77'; Rui Costa 88'

Jeonju World Cup Stadium, Jeonju
Attendance: 31,000
Referee: Hugh Dallas (Scotland)

Portugal	Poland

GK	1	Vítor Baía
RB	18	Nuno Frechaut	(yellow card) 25'	(substituted off) 63'
CB	5	Fernando Couto (c)
CB	2	Jorge Costa	(yellow card) 27'
LB	23	Rui Jorge	(yellow card) 31'
CM	20	Petit
CM	17	Paulo Bento
RW	11	Sérgio Conceição		(substituted off) 69'
AM	8	João Pinto		(substituted off) 60'
LW	7	Luís Figo
CF	9	Pauleta
Substitutions:
MF	10	Rui Costa		(substituted on) 60'
DF	22	Beto		(substituted on) 63'
FW	19	Nuno Capucho		(substituted on) 69'
Manager:
António Oliveira

GK	1	Jerzy Dudek
RB	21	Marek Koźmiński
CB	6	Tomasz Hajto
CB	15	Tomasz Wałdoch (c)
LB	4	Michał Żewłakow		(substituted off) 71'
RM	19	Maciej Żurawski		(substituted off) 56'
CM	10	Radosław Kałużny		(substituted off) 16'
CM	7	Piotr Świerczewski	(yellow card) 21'
LM	18	Jacek Krzynówek
CF	11	Emmanuel Olisadebe
CF	9	Paweł Kryszałowicz
Substitutions:
MF	17	Arkadiusz Bąk	(yellow card) 39'	(substituted on) 16'
FW	14	Marcin Żewłakow		(substituted on) 56'
DF	5	Tomasz Rząsa		(substituted on) 71'
Manager:
Jerzy Engel

Man of the Match:
Pauleta (Portugal)

Assistant referees:
Igor Šramka (Slovakia)
Wagih Farag (Egypt)
Fourth official:
Carlos Batres (Guatemala)

=== Portugal vs South Korea ===
14 June 2002
20:30

Portugal	0–1	South Korea
		Park Ji-sung 70'

Incheon World Cup Stadium, Incheon
Attendance: 50,239
Referee: Ángel Sánchez (Argentina)

Portugal	South Korea

GK	1	Vítor Baía
RB	22	Beto	(yellow card) 22' (yellow-red card) 66'
CB	5	Fernando Couto (c)
CB	2	Jorge Costa	(yellow card) 83'
LB	23	Rui Jorge		(substituted off) 73'
CM	20	Petit		(substituted off) 77'
CM	17	Paulo Bento
RW	11	Sérgio Conceição
AM	8	João Pinto	(red card) 27'
LW	7	Luís Figo
CF	9	Pauleta		(substituted off) 69'
Substitutions:
DF	13	Jorge Andrade		(substituted on) 69'
DF	3	Abel Xavier		(substituted on) 73'
FW	21	Nuno Gomes		(substituted on) 77'
Manager:
António Oliveira

GK	1	Lee Woon-jae
CB	4	Choi Jin-cheul
CB	20	Hong Myung-bo (c)
CB	7	Kim Tae-young	(yellow card) 24'
RM	22	Song Chong-gug
CM	6	Yoo Sang-chul
CM	5	Kim Nam-il	(yellow card) 74'
LM	10	Lee Young-pyo
RF	21	Park Ji-sung
CF	19	Ahn Jung-hwan	(yellow card) 90+3'	(substituted off) 90+3'
LF	9	Seol Ki-hyeon	(yellow card) 57'
Substitutions:
MF	14	Lee Chun-soo		(substituted on) 90+3'
Manager:
(Netherlands) Guus Hiddink

Man of the Match:
Park Ji-sung (South Korea)

Assistant referees:
Ali Al Traifi (Saudi Arabia)
Ferenc Szekely (Hungary)
Fourth official:
Kyros Vassaras (Greece)

=== Poland vs United States ===
14 June 2002
20:30

Poland	3–1	United States
Olisadebe 3'; Kryszałowicz 5'; Żewłakow 66'		Donovan 83'

Daejeon World Cup Stadium, Daejeon
Attendance: 26,482
Referee: Lu Jun (China)

Poland	United States

GK	12	Radosław Majdan	(yellow card) 44'
RB	2	Tomasz Kłos		(substituted off) 89'
CB	13	Arkadiusz Głowacki
CB	3	Jacek Zieliński (c)
LB	21	Marek Koźmiński	(yellow card) 46'
RM	19	Maciej Żurawski
CM	8	Cezary Kucharski	(yellow card) 63'	(substituted off) 65'
CM	16	Maciej Murawski
LM	18	Jacek Krzynówek
CF	11	Emmanuel Olisadebe	(yellow card) 86'	(substituted off) 87'
CF	9	Paweł Kryszałowicz
Substitutions:
FW	14	Marcin Żewłakow		(substituted on) 65'
MF	23	Paweł Sibik		(substituted on) 87'
DF	15	Tomasz Wałdoch		(substituted on) 89'
Manager:
Jerzy Engel

GK	1	Brad Friedel
RB	22	Tony Sanneh
CB	23	Eddie Pope
CB	12	Jeff Agoos		(substituted off) 36'
LB	2	Frankie Hejduk	(yellow card) 72'
RM	8	Earnie Stewart		(substituted off) 68'
CM	10	Claudio Reyna (c)
CM	5	John O'Brien
LM	21	Landon Donovan
CF	11	Clint Mathis
CF	20	Brian McBride		(substituted off) 58'
Substitutions:
MF	17	DaMarcus Beasley		(substituted on) 36'
FW	9	Joe-Max Moore		(substituted on) 58'
MF	13	Cobi Jones		(substituted on) 68'
Manager:
Bruce Arena

Man of the Match:
Jacek Krzynówek (Poland)

Assistant referees:
Bomer Fierro (Ecuador)
Jaap Pool (Netherlands)
Fourth official:
Coffi Codjia (Benin)

== See also ==
- Poland at the FIFA World Cup
- Portugal at the FIFA World Cup
- South Korea at the FIFA World Cup
- United States at the FIFA World Cup
