= Żewłakow =

Żewłakow is a Polish surname. Notable people with the surname include:

- Marcin Żewłakow (born 1976), Polish footballer
- Michał Żewłakow (born 1976), Polish footballer
