= UEFA Euro 2004 qualifying Group 4 =

Football tournament qualification stage

Standings and results for Group 4 of the UEFA Euro 2004 qualifying tournament.

Group 4 consisted of Hungary, Latvia, Poland, San Marino and Sweden. Group winners were Sweden, who finished one point clear of second-placed team Latvia who qualified for the play-offs.

== Standings ==
Pos	Team	Pld	W	D	L	GF	GA	GD	Pts	Qualification	(Sweden)	(Latvia)	(Poland)	(Hungary)	(San Marino)
1	Sweden	8	5	2	1	19	3	+16	17	Qualify for final tournament	—	0–1	3–0	1–1	5–0
2	Latvia	8	5	1	2	10	6	+4	16	Advance to play-offs	0–0	—	0–2	3–1	3–0
3	Poland	8	4	1	3	11	7	+4	13		0–2	0–1	—	0–0	5–0
4	Hungary	8	3	2	3	15	9	+6	11		1–2	3–1	1–2	—	3–0
5	San Marino	8	0	0	8	0	30	−30	0		0–6	0–1	0–2	0–5	—

Source: UEFA
Rules for classification: Qualification tiebreakers

== Matches ==
7 September 2002
20:00 UTC+03:00

Latvia	0–0	Sweden
	Report

Skonto Stadium, Riga
Attendance: 8,500
Referee: Frank De Bleeckere (Belgium)
7 September 2002
20:00 UTC+02:00

San Marino	0–2	Poland
	Report	Kaczorowski 75'; Kukiełka 88'

Stadio Olimpico, Serravalle
Attendance: 2,421
Referee: Paul McKeon (Republic of Ireland)

12 October 2002
16:00 UTC+02:00

Sweden	1–1	Hungary
Ibrahimović 76'	Report	Kenesei 5'

Råsunda Stadium, Solna
Attendance: 35,084
Referee: Wolfgang Stark (Germany)
12 October 2002
19:00 UTC+02:00

Poland	0–1	Latvia
	Report	Laizāns 30'

Stadion Wojska Polskiego, Warsaw
Attendance: 11,814
Referee: Massimo Busacca (Switzerland)

16 October 2002
20:30 UTC+02:00

Hungary	3–0	San Marino
Gera 49', 60', 85'	Report

Szusza Ferenc Stadion, Budapest
Attendance: 4,136
Referee: Gylfi Þor Orrason (Iceland)

20 November 2002
20:00 UTC+01:00

San Marino	0–1	Latvia
	Report	Valentini 89' (o.g.)

Stadio Olimpico, Serravalle
Attendance: 637
Referee: Asim Khudiev (Azerbaijan)

29 March 2003
20:00 UTC+01:00

Poland	0–0	Hungary
	Report

Stadion Śląski, Chorzów
Attendance: 42,200
Referee: Massimo De Santis (Italy)

2 April 2003
20:00 UTC+02:00

Poland	5–0	San Marino
Szymkowiak 5'; Kosowski 26'; Kuźba 54', 90'; Karwan 81'	Report

Miejski Stadion Sportowy "KSZO", Ostrowiec Świętokrzyski
Attendance: 8,000
Referee: Loizos Loizou (Cyprus)
2 April 2003
20:15 UTC+02:00

Hungary	1–2	Sweden
Lisztes 64'	Report	Allbäck 33', 66'

Ferenc Puskás Stadium, Budapest
Attendance: 22,162
Referee: Lucílio Batista (Portugal)

30 April 2003
19:00 UTC+03:00

Latvia	3–0	San Marino
Prohorenkovs 10'; Bleidelis 21', 74'	Report

Skonto Stadium, Riga
Attendance: 7,500
Referee: Hubert Byrne (Republic of Ireland)

7 June 2003
20:15 UTC+02:00

Hungary	3–1	Latvia
Szabics 51', 58'; Gera 87'	Report	Verpakovskis 38'

Ferenc Puskás Stadium, Budapest
Attendance: 3,500
Referee: Markus Merk (Germany)
7 June 2003
20:30 UTC+02:00

San Marino	0–6	Sweden
	Report	Jonson 16', 60', 70'; Allbäck 49', 85'; Ljungberg 55'

Stadio Olimpico, Serravalle
Attendance: 2,184
Referee: Dejan Delević (Serbia and Montenegro)

11 June 2003
20:00 UTC+02:00

Sweden	3–0	Poland
Svensson 16', 72'; Allbäck 43'	Report

Råsunda Stadium, Solna
Attendance: 35,220
Referee: Gilles Veissière (France)
11 June 2003
20:00 UTC+02:00

San Marino	0–5	Hungary
	Report	Böőr 4'; Lisztes 20', 81'; Kenesei 60'; Szabics 76'

Stadio Olimpico, Serravalle
Attendance: 1,410
Referee: Kenny Clark (Scotland)

6 September 2003
16:00 UTC+02:00

Sweden	5–0	San Marino
Jonson 32'; Jakobsson 48'; Ibrahimović 53', 81' (pen.); Källström 66' (pen.)	Report

Ullevi, Gothenburg
Attendance: 31,098
Referee: Stefan Messner (Austria)
6 September 2003
20:30 UTC+03:00

Latvia	0–2	Poland
	Report	Szymkowiak 36'; Kłos 39'

Skonto Stadium, Riga
Attendance: 6,500
Referee: Kyros Vassaras (Greece)

10 September 2003
21:00 UTC+03:00

Latvia	3–1	Hungary
Verpakovskis 38', 51'; Bleidelis 43'	Report	Lisztes 53'

Skonto Stadium, Riga
Attendance: 5,500
Referee: Claus Bo Larsen (Denmark)
10 September 2003
20:15 UTC+02:00

Poland	0–2	Sweden
	Report	Nilsson 3'; Mellberg 38'

Stadion Śląski, Chorzów
Attendance: 18,500
Referee: Mike Riley (England)

11 October 2003
17:00 UTC+02:00

Sweden	0–1	Latvia
	Report	Verpakovskis 22'

Råsunda Stadium, Solna
Attendance: 32,095
Referee: Massimo De Santis (Italy)
11 October 2003
17:00 UTC+02:00

Hungary	1–2	Poland
Szabics 48'	Report	Niedzielan 10', 63'

Ferenc Puskás Stadium, Budapest
Attendance: 13,800
Referee: Manuel Mejuto González (Spain)

== Goalscorers ==
There were 55 goals scored in 20 matches, for an average of 2.75 goals per match.

5 goals

- (Sweden) Marcus Allbäck

4 goals

- (Hungary) Zoltán Gera
- (Hungary) Krisztián Lisztes
- (Hungary) Imre Szabics
- (Latvia) Māris Verpakovskis
- (Sweden) Mattias Jonson

3 goals

- (Latvia) Imants Bleidelis
- (Sweden) Zlatan Ibrahimović

2 goals

- (Hungary) Krisztián Kenesei
- (Poland) Marcin Kuźba
- (Poland) Andrzej Niedzielan
- (Poland) Mirosław Szymkowiak
- (Sweden) Anders Svensson

1 goal

- (Hungary) Zoltán Böőr
- (Latvia) Juris Laizāns
- (Latvia) Andrejs Prohorenkovs
- (Poland) Paweł Kaczorowski
- (Poland) Bartosz Karwan
- (Poland) Tomasz Kłos
- (Poland) Kamil Kosowski
- (Poland) Mariusz Kukiełka
- (Sweden) Andreas Jakobsson
- (Sweden) Kim Källström
- (Sweden) Freddie Ljungberg
- (Sweden) Olof Mellberg
- (Sweden) Mikael Nilsson

1 own goal

- (San Marino) Carlo Valentini (against Latvia)
