= Mariusz Kukiełka =

Polish footballer

Personal information
- Date of birth: 7 November 1976 (age 49)
- Place of birth: Tarnobrzeg, Poland
- Height: 1.83 m (6 ft 0 in)
- Positions: Centre-back; defensive midfielder

Senior career*
Years	Team	Apps	(Gls)
1990–1996	Siarka Tarnobrzeg	59	(2)
1996–1997	GKS Bełchatów	28	(3)
1997–1998	Roda	8	(0)
1998–2002	Amica Wronki	65	(14)
2002–2003	PAOK	26	(0)
2003–2004	1. FC Nürnberg	14	(1)
2004	Wisła Kraków	17	(0)
2004–2006	Dynamo Dresden	44	(2)
2006–2009	Energie Cottbus	63	(1)
2009–2010	Skoda Xanthi	4	(0)
2010–2011	Germania Windeck	31	(7)
2011–2013	Viktoria Köln	62	(7)
2014–2015	Wisła Sandomierz	30	(7)
2015	Siarka Tarnobrzeg	15	(2)
2015	JKS 1909 Jarosław	18	(1)
Total		484	(47)

International career
- Poland U16
- Poland U17
1997–2004	Poland	20	(3)
Medal record
Men's football
Representing Poland
UEFA European Under-16 Championship
Winner	1993 Turkey
- * Club domestic league appearances and goals

Mariusz Kukiełka (Polish pronunciation: [ˈmarjuʂ kuˈkʲɛwka]; born 7 November 1976) is a Polish former professional footballer who played as a centre-back or as a midfielder. Kukiełka made 20 appearances for the Poland national team, scoring three goals.

== International goals ==
Scores and results list Poland's goal tally first, score column indicates score after each Kukiełka goal.

List of international goals scored by Mariusz Kukiełka
No.	Date	Venue	Opponent	Score	Result	Competition
1	7 September 2002	Stadio Olimpico, Serravalle, San Marino	San Marino	2–0	2–0	UEFA Euro 2004 qualifying
2	16 October 2002	Miejski Stadion Sportowy "KSZO", Ostrowiec Świętokrzyski, Poland	New Zealand	2–0	2–0	Friendly
3	21 February 2004	Estadio Bahía Sur, San Fernando, Spain	Faroe Islands	6–0	6–0	Friendly

== Honours ==
Amica Wronki

- Polish Cup: 1998–99, 1999–2000

PAOK

- Greek Cup: 2002–03

1. FC Nürnberg

- 2. Bundesliga: 2003–04

Wisła Kraków

- Ekstraklasa: 2003–04

Poland U16

- UEFA European Under-16 Championship: 1993
