= Paweł Kryszałowicz =

Polish footballer

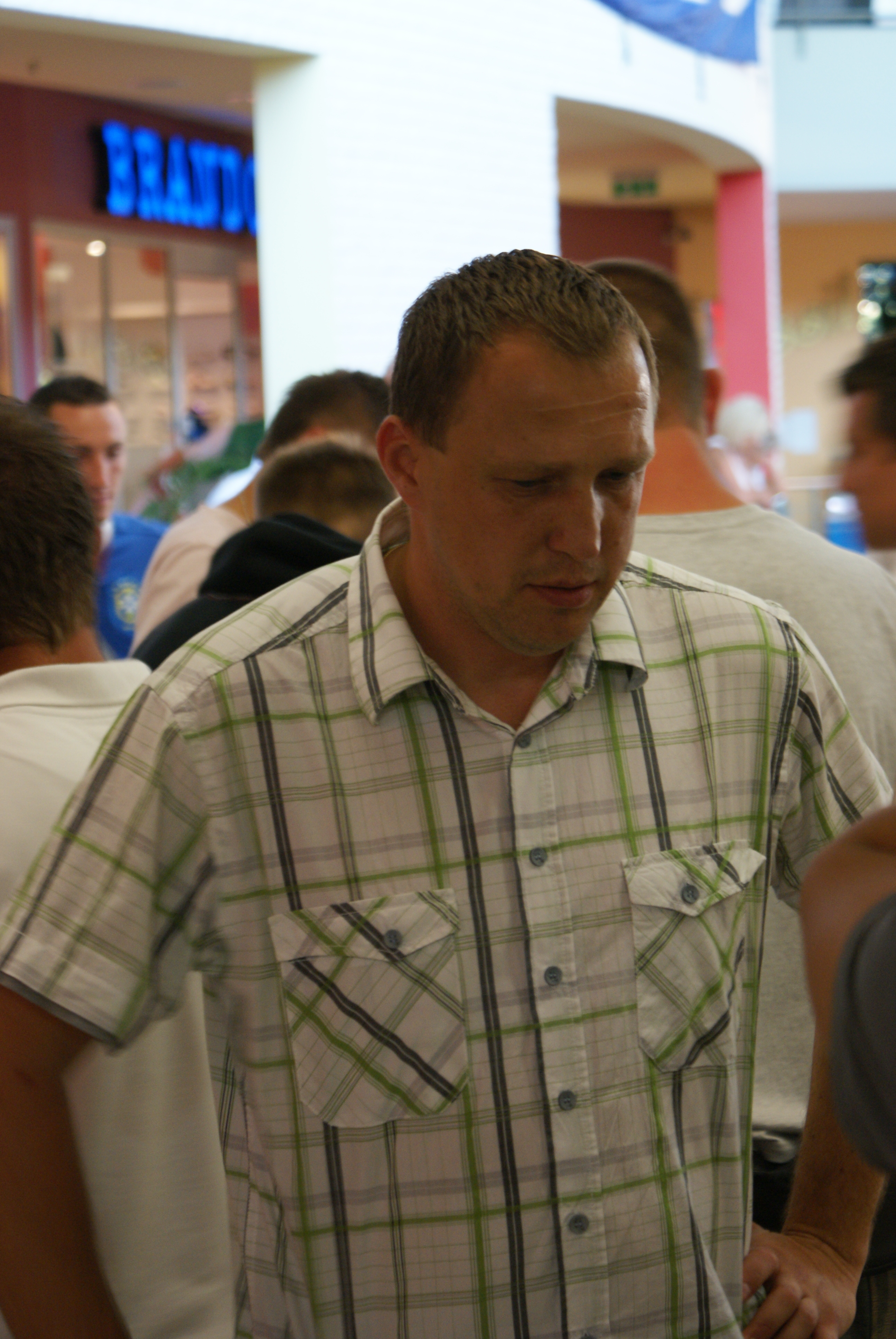
- Kryszałowicz in 2009

Personal information
- Date of birth: 23 June 1974 (age 52)
- Place of birth: Słupsk, Poland
- Height: 1.82 m (6 ft 0 in)
- Position: Striker

Senior career*
Years	Team	Apps	(Gls)
1990–1994	Gryf Słupsk		
1994–1995	Zawisza Bydgoszcz		
1995–2000	Amica Wronki	156	(50)
2001–2003	Eintracht Frankfurt	70	(26)
2003–2005	Amica Wronki	46	(19)
2005–2006	Wisła Kraków	27	(7)
2007	SV Wilhelmshaven	13	(2)
2007–2010	Gryf Słupsk	54+	(17+)

International career
1999–2004	Poland	33	(10)
- * Club domestic league appearances and goals

Paweł Kryszałowicz (Polish pronunciation: [ˈpavɛw krɨʂaˈwɔvitʂ]) (born 23 June 1974) is a Polish former professional footballer who played as a striker. He represented Poland in 33 matches scoring ten goals. A highlight of his career was the participation and goal scored at the 2002 FIFA World Cup.

== Career statistics ==
=== International ===
Appearances and goals by national team and year
National team	Year	Apps	Goals
Poland	1999	1	0
Poland	2000	7	1
Poland	2001	11	2
Poland	2002	8	3
Poland	2003	4	0
Poland	2004	2	4
Total		33	10

Scores and results list Poland's goal tally first, score column indicates score after each Kryszałowicz goal.

List of international goals scored by Paweł Kryszałowicz
No.	Date	Venue	Opponent	Score	Result	Competition
1	4 June 2000	Stade Olympique de la Pontaise, Lausanne, Switzerland	Netherlands	1–1	1–3	Friendly
2	2 June 2001	Millennium Stadium, Cardiff, Wales	Wales	2–1	2–1	2002 FIFA World Cup qualification
3	1 September 2001	Silesian Stadium, Chorzów, Poland	Norway	1–0	3–0	2002 FIFA World Cup qualification
4	13 February 2002	Tsirion Stadium, Limassol, Cyprus	Northern Ireland	1–0	4–1	Friendly
5	13 February 2002	Tsirion Stadium, Limassol, Cyprus	Northern Ireland	2–1	4–1	Friendly
6	14 June 2002	World Cup Stadium, Daejeon, South Korea	United States	2–0	3–1	2002 FIFA World Cup
7	21 February 2004	Estadio Bahía Sur, San Fernando, Spain	Faroe Islands	1–0	6–0	Friendly
8	21 February 2004	Estadio Bahía Sur, San Fernando, Spain	Faroe Islands	2–0	6–0	Friendly
9	21 February 2004	Estadio Bahía Sur, San Fernando, Spain	Faroe Islands	3–0	6–0	Friendly
10	21 February 2004	Estadio Bahía Sur, San Fernando, Spain	Faroe Islands	4–0	6–0	Friendly

== Honours ==
Amica Wronki

- Polish Cup: 1997–98, 1998–99, 1999–2000
- Polish Super Cup: 1998
