= Tomasz Kłos =

Polish footballer (born 1973)

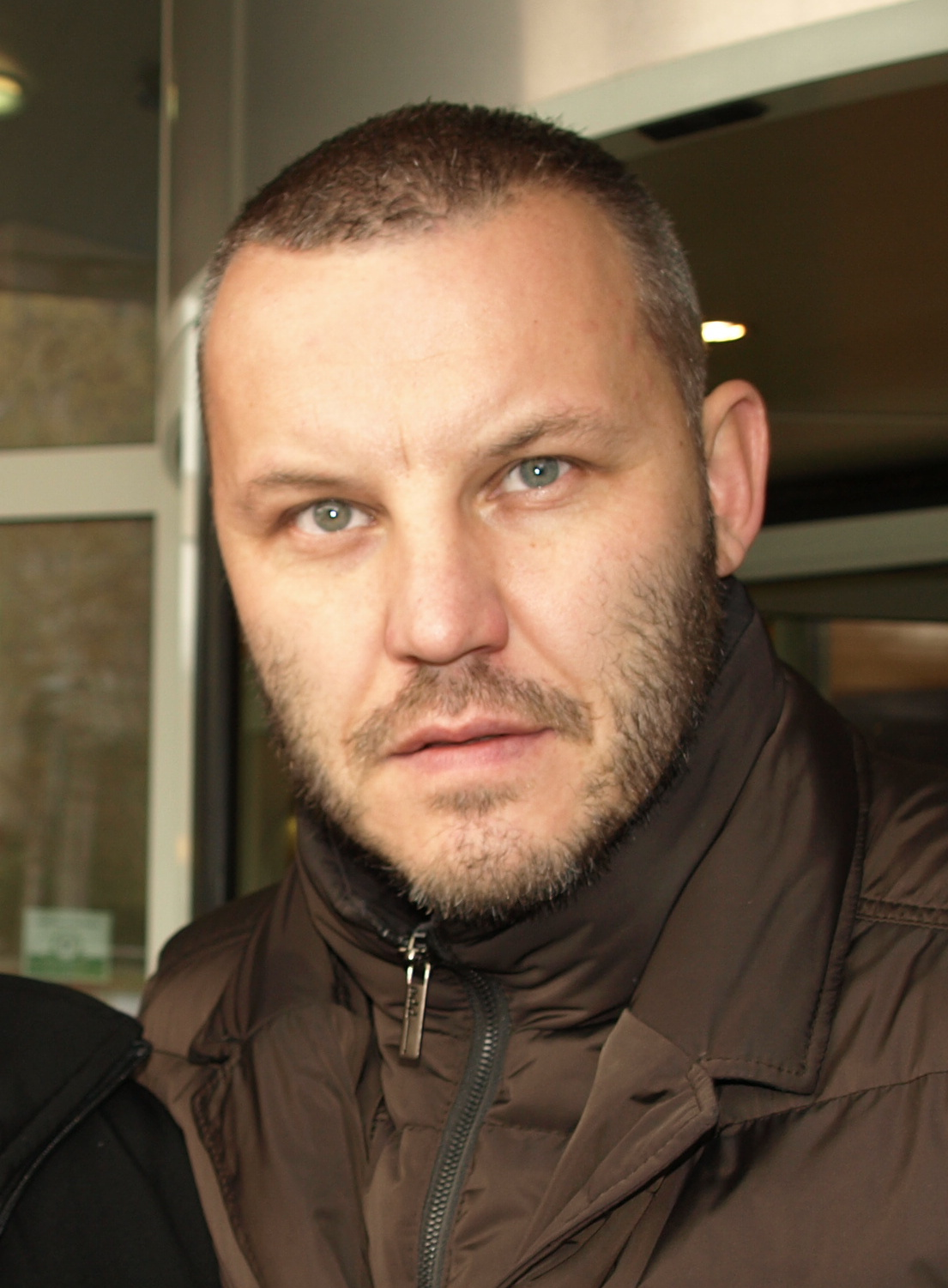
- Kłos in 2013

Personal information
- Full name: Tomasz Kłos
- Date of birth: 7 March 1973 (age 53)
- Place of birth: Zgierz, Poland
- Height: 1.86 m (6 ft 1 in)
- Position: Defender

Senior career*
Years	Team	Apps	(Gls)
1990–1991	Boruta Zgierz		
1991–1992	Włókniarz Aleksandrów Łódzki		
1992–1995	Boruta Zgierz		
1995–1998	ŁKS Łódź	94	(20)
1998–2000	Auxerre	60	(4)
2001–2003	1. FC Kaiserslautern	51	(5)
2003	1. FC Köln	6	(0)
2004–2006	Wisła Kraków	67	(5)
2007–2008	ŁKS Łódź	39	(2)
Total		317	(36)

International career
1998–2006	Poland	69	(6)
- * Club domestic league appearances and goals

Tomasz Kłos (Polish pronunciation: [ˈtɔmaʂ ˈkwɔs]) (born 7 March 1973) is a Polish former professional footballer. He primarily played as a defender and played for several clubs in Poland and abroad during his career. He also represented the Poland national team at international level.

== Club career ==
Kłos began his playing career at Boruta Zgierz in Zgierz, before moving to Włókniarz Aleksandrów Łódzki and then joining ŁKS Łódź in 1995. From the 1995–96 season through the 1997–98 season, he made 94 league appearances for ŁKS, scoring 20 goals. In particular, during the 1997–98 season, he scored 9 goals in 31 appearances, helping the team win the Ekstraklasa title.

In the summer of 1998, Kłos moved to Ligue 1 club Auxerre. He made 30 league appearances and scored 4 goals during the 1998–99 season, followed by 26 appearances in the 1999–2000 season. He also made 4 appearances at the beginning of the 2000–01 season before transferring to Bundesliga club 1. FC Kaiserslautern.

Kłos played for 1. FC Kaiserslautern from the 2000–01 season through the 2002–03 season. He made 22 appearances and scored 2 goals in the 2000–01 season, 11 appearances and 1 goal in the 2001–02 season, and 18 appearances and 2 goals in the 2002–03 season. During the 2002–03 season, he also played for the club's reserve team.

In the 2003–04 season, he moved to 1. FC Köln, where he made 6 league appearances. In January 2004, he returned to Poland and joined Wisła Kraków. He played for Wisła Kraków from the second half of the 2003–04 season through the 2005–06 season, making 13 league appearances and scoring 1 goal in the 2003–04 season, 25 appearances and 2 goals in the 2004–05 season, and 29 appearances and 2 goals in the 2005–06 season. During this period, he helped Wisła Kraków win the Polish league title in 2004 and 2005.

In 2006, Kłos returned to his former club ŁKS Łódź. In the second half of the 2006–07 season, he made 12 league appearances and scored 1 goal, while in the 2007–08 season he made 27 appearances and scored 1 goal. During his second spell at ŁKS, he made 39 league appearances and scored 2 goals. He retired from professional football on 1 July 2008.

== International career ==
Kłos made his debut for the Poland national team on 8 February 1998 in a friendly against Paraguay, starting in a match that Poland lost 0–4.

Kłos was part of the Poland national team at the 2002 FIFA World Cup. He came on as a substitute for Arkadiusz Bąk in the 51st minute of Poland's opening group-stage match against South Korea. He subsequently started in the group-stage match against the United States. Poland won the match 3–1 but failed to advance from the group stage.

Kłos continued to represent Poland after the 2002 World Cup. During the 2006 FIFA World Cup qualifiers, he featured in matches against Azerbaijan, Northern Ireland, and Austria, among others, and remained part of the national team's defensive setup during the qualifying campaign.

However, Kłos was left out of Poland's final squad for the 2006 FIFA World Cup, along with Jerzy Dudek, Tomasz Rząsa, and Tomasz Frankowski. His final international appearance came on 28 March 2006 in a friendly against Saudi Arabia, which Poland won 2–1.

Kłos made a total of 69 appearances for the Poland national team between 1998 and 2006, scoring 6 goals.

== Career statistics ==
=== International ===
Appearances and goals by national team and year
National team	Year	Apps	Goals
Poland	1998	6	0
Poland	1999	9	1
Poland	2000	9	0
Poland	2001	10	0
Poland	2002	5	0
Poland	2003	8	2
Poland	2004	9	1
Poland	2005	11	2
Poland	2006	2	0
Total		69	6

Scores and results list Poland's goal tally first, score column indicates score after each Kłos goal.

List of international goals scored by Tomasz Kłos
No.	Date	Venue	Opponent	Score	Result	Competition
1	3 February 1999	Ta' Qali National Stadium, Ta' Qali, Malta	Malta	1–0	1–0	Friendly
2	6 September 2003	Skonto Stadium, Riga, Latvia	Latvia	2–0	2–0	UEFA Euro 2004 qualifying
3	21 February 2004	Stadion Wojska Polskiego, Warsaw, Poland	Italy	2–0	3–1	Friendly
4	21 February 2004	Estadio Bahía Sur, San Fernando, Spain	Faroe Islands	5–0	6–0	Friendly
5	4 June 2005	Tofiq Bahramov Stadium, Baku, Azerbaijan	Azerbaijan	2–0	3–0	2006 FIFA World Cup qualification
6	13 November 2005	Mini Estadi, Barcelona, Spain	Ecuador	1–0	3–0	Friendly

== Honours ==
ŁKS Łódź

- Ekstraklasa: 1997–98

Wisła Kraków

- Ekstraklasa: 2003–04, 2004–05

Individual

- Polish Newcomer of the Year: 1997
