= Arthur Minasyan (footballer, born 1978) =

Armenian footballer

Personal information
- Full name: Arthur Sergei Minasyan
- Date of birth: 9 August 1978 (age 48)
- Place of birth: Armenian SSR, Soviet Union
- Height: 1.78 m (5 ft 10 in)
- Position: Midfielder

Senior career*
Years	Team	Apps	(Gls)
1994	Nairi	2	(0)
1995–1998	FC Yerevan	49	(4)
1997	→ Ararat Yerevan (loan)	27	(8)
1998–1999	FC Lausanne-Sport	2	(0)
1999	Ararat Yerevan		
2000	Dynamo Moscow	0	(0)
2001	Araks-Impeks	2	(0)
2001	→ Ararat Yerevan (loan)		
2001	→ Banants (loan)	12	(5)
2002	Banants	16	(1)
2002–2003	Anorthosis Famagusta		
2003–2004	Banants	3	(0)
2003	→ Pyunik (loan)	4	(0)
2003	→ Pyunik-2 (loan)	1	(1)
2005	Lernayin Artsakh	9	(2)
2006	Ulisses	13	(5)
2008	Ararat Yerevan	9	(0)
2008	→ Kilikia (loan)	21	(0)
2009	Kilikia	10	(1)
Total		180+	(27+)

International career
1999–2001	Armenia	4	(1)
- * Club domestic league appearances and goals

Arthur Sergei Minasyan (Armenian: Արթուր Սերգեյի Մինասյան, Russian: Артур Сергеевич Минасян; born 9 August 1978) is an Armenian former footballer who played as a midfielder and made four appearances for the Armenia national team.

== Career ==
Minasyan made his international debut for Armenia on 9 October 1999 in a UEFA Euro 2000 qualifying match against Andorra, which finished as a 3–0 away win. He made four appearances in total for Armenia, earning his last cap on 12 February 2001 in the 2001 Albena-Mobiltel Tournament against Uzbekistan. Minasyan scored his only international goal in the match to double Armenia's lead, with the fixture finishing as a 2–0 win.

== Career statistics ==
=== International ===
Armenia
Year	Apps	Goals
1999	1	0
2000	2	0
2001	1	1
Total	4	1

=== International goals ===
No.	Date	Venue	Opponent	Score	Result	Competition
1	12 April 2001	Stadium Albena, Obrochishte, Bulgaria	Uzbekistan	2–0	2–0	2001 Albena-Mobiltel Tournament
