= Felix Khojoyan =

Armenian footballer and manager

Personal information
- Full name: Felix Khojoyan
- Date of birth: 22 December 1974 (age 51)
- Place of birth: Gyumri, Armenia
- Position: Defender

Senior career*
Years	Team	Apps	(Gls)
1998–2000	Shirak		
2001–2002	Spartak Yerevan		
2002–2004	Pegah Gilan		
2005–2009	Shirak	74	(0)

International career
1997–2001	Armenia	18	(1)

Managerial career
- 2010–: Shirak (assistant)
- * Club domestic league appearances and goals

Felix Khojoyan (Armenian: Ֆելիքս Ալբերտի Խոջոյան, born on 22 December 1974), is an Armenian football manager and former footballer who mainly played as defender throughout his career.

Khojoyan was a member of the Armenia national team, being capped 18 times. Currently, he is working as an assistant manager in Armenian Premier League club FC Shirak.
