= Paweł Kaczorowski =

Polish footballer (born 1974)

Personal information
- Date of birth: 22 March 1974 (age 52)
- Place of birth: Zduńska Wola, Poland
- Height: 1.79 m (5 ft 10 in)
- Position: Defender

Team information
- Current team: Hallingdal FK (youth coach)

Senior career*
Years	Team	Apps	(Gls)
1998–1999	KSZO Ostrowiec Świętokrzyski	11+	(0+)
1999–2000	Lech Poznań	22	(1)
2000–2002	Polonia Warsaw	54	(1)
2003–2004	Lech Poznań	43	(2)
2005	Legia Warsaw	10	(1)
2006	Wisła Kraków	0	(0)
2007	Śląsk Wrocław	12	(1)
2007–2008	Warta Poznań	14	(0)
2008–2010	Stilon Gorzów Wielkopolski	40	(3)
2011	Tur Turek	8	(0)
2012	Kolejorz Poznań		
2012	Lech Poznań (oldboys)		
2012	Jutrzenka Warta		
2013–2016	Hallingdal FK	57	(5)

International career
2000–2005	Poland	14	(1)

Managerial career
- 2011: Tur Turek (caretaker)
- Hallingdal FK (youth coach)
- * Club domestic league appearances and goals

Paweł Kaczorowski (Polish pronunciation: [ˈpa.vɛw ka.t͡ʂɔ.ˈrɔf.skʲi]; born 22 March 1974) is a Polish former professional footballer who played as a defender. He is currently a youth team coach for Norwegian club Hallingdal FK.

== Club career ==
He has previously played for Polish Ekstraklasa clubs Lech Poznań, Legia Warsaw, Wisła Kraków, and Śląsk Wrocław. Besides Poland, he has played in Norway.

== International career ==
Kaczorowski has made 14 appearances for the Poland national team, scoring one goal.

== Career statistics ==
=== International ===
Appearances and goals by national team and year
National team	Year	Apps	Goals
Poland
Poland	2000	2	0
Poland	2001	2	0
Poland	2002	4	1
Poland	2003	1	0
Poland	2004	4	0
Poland	2005	1	0
Total		14	1

Scores and results list Poland's goal tally first, score column indicates score after each Kaczorowski goal.

List of international goals scored by Paweł Kaczorowski
No.	Date	Venue	Opponent	Score	Result	Competition
1	7 September 2002	Stadio Olimpico, Serravalle, San Marino	San Marino	1–0	2–0	UEFA Euro 2004 qualifying

== Honours ==
Polonia Warsaw

- Polish Cup: 2000–01

Lech Poznań

- Polish Cup: 2003–04
- Polish Super Cup: 2004
