= Radosław Kałużny =

Polish footballer (born 1974)

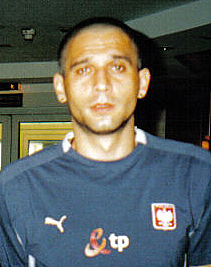
- Kałużny in 2007

Personal information
- Full name: Radosław Kałużny
- Date of birth: 2 February 1974 (age 52)
- Place of birth: Góra, Lower Silesian Voivodeship, Poland
- Height: 1.92 m (6 ft 3 1/2 in)
- Position: Midfielder

Youth career
- Chojnowianka Chojnów

Senior career*
Years	Team	Apps	(Gls)
1992–1998	Zagłębie Lubin	163	(22)
1998–2001	Wisła Kraków	82	(17)
2001–2003	Energie Cottbus	40	(7)
2003–2005	Bayer 04 Leverkusen	12	(0)
2005	Rot-Weiss Essen	14	(1)
2005–2006	LR Ahlen	19	(3)
2006–2007	AEL Limassol	18	(0)
2007–2008	Jagiellonia Białystok	22	(0)
2010	Chrobry Głogów	9	(0)
Total		379	(50)

International career
1997–2005	Poland	41	(11)
- * Club domestic league appearances and goals

Radosław Kałużny (Polish pronunciation: [raˈdɔswaf kaˈwuʐnɨ]; born 2 February 1974) is a Polish former professional footballer. He primarily played as a midfielder and won the league title twice with Wisła Kraków.

He also played for German clubs including Energie Cottbus and Bayer Leverkusen, and made 41 appearances for the Poland national football team, scoring 11 goals. He also represented Poland at the 2002 FIFA World Cup.

== Club career ==
Born in Góra, Lower Silesian Voivodeship, Kałużny developed at Chojnowianka Chojnów before beginning his professional career with Zagłębie Lubin. He made his first-team debut in 1992 and remained at Zagłębie Lubin until 1998, making 163 league appearances and scoring 22 goals. In 1998, he moved to Wisła Kraków, where he became a regular starter and won the Polish league title twice, in the 1998–99 and 2000–01 seasons. He also won the Polish League Cup in the 2000–01 season.

In 2001, he moved to German club Energie Cottbus. He made his Bundesliga debut on 28 July 2001 against Hamburger SV, and subsequently became a regular starter, making 40 league appearances and scoring seven goals over two seasons. He initially joined on loan, but Energie Cottbus decided to sign him permanently before he subsequently moved to Bayer Leverkusen.

Kałużny joined Bayer Leverkusen in early 2003 and remained there until the 2004–05 season. He made 12 Bundesliga appearances and four appearances in the UEFA Champions League for the club before moving to Rot-Weiss Essen in January 2005. At Essen, he made 14 appearances in the 2. Bundesliga, scoring one goal.

During the 2005–06 season, he moved to LR Ahlen, where he made 19 appearances in the 2. Bundesliga and scored three goals. He subsequently moved to Cyprus in 2006 to join AEL Limassol, spending one season there before joining Jagiellonia Białystok in 2007. He ended his professional playing career after the 2007–08 season, but returned to football in 2010 by joining Chrobry Głogów. He made his comeback on 27 March 2010 against Pogoń Oleśnica, and subsequently worked as the club's sporting director. He ended his playing career permanently later that year.

== International career ==
Kałużny made his debut for the Poland national team on 14 February 1997 in a friendly match against Lithuania. In 1997, he made 10 appearances and scored three goals, while in 2000 he scored four goals in six appearances. In particular, he scored a hat-trick against Belarus in 2000.

He was a regular midfielder for Poland during the European qualifying campaign for the 2002 FIFA World Cup, as Poland finished top of their group to qualify for the tournament. Kałużny appeared in the qualifying campaign, including matches against Armenia on 6 June 2001 and Norway on 1 September.

Kałużny was part of the Poland national team squad at the 2002 FIFA World Cup. He started Poland's opening group-stage match against South Korea, but was substituted for Marcin Żewłakow around the 20th minute of the second half. Poland lost the match 2–0.

He also started the second group-stage match against Portugal, but was substituted for Arkadiusz Bąk in the 16th minute. Poland lost 4–0 to Portugal, suffering their second consecutive defeat.

Poland defeated the United States 3–1 in their final group-stage match, but finished third in the group with one win and two defeats and failed to advance to the round of 16. Kałużny did not play against the United States.

== Career statistics ==
=== International ===
Appearances and goals by national team and year
National team	Year	Apps	Goals
Poland	1997	10	3
Poland	1998	3	0
Poland	1999	1	0
Poland	2000	6	4
Poland	2001	6	2
Poland	2002	8	1
Poland	2003	2	0
Poland	2004	3	1
Poland	2005	2	0
Total		41	11

== Post-retirement ==
After retirement, Kałużny found employment doing mainly manual labour in construction, warehousing and waste management.

== Honours ==
Wisła Kraków

- Ekstraklasa: 1998–99, 2000–01
- Polish League Cup: 2000–01
