= Michał Żewłakow =

Polish footballer (born 1976)

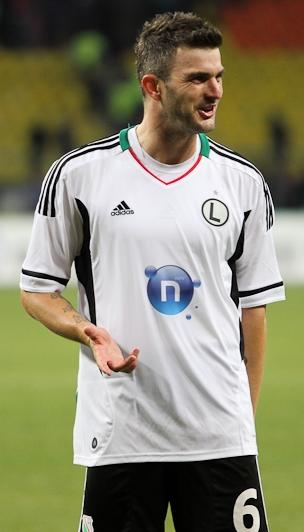
- Żewłakow with Legia Warsaw in 2011

Personal information
- Full name: Michał Ryszard Żewłakow
- Date of birth: 22 April 1976 (age 50)
- Place of birth: Warsaw, Poland
- Height: 1.83 m (6 ft 0 in)
- Positions: Centre-back; full back

Youth career
- 1987–1988: Drukarz Warsaw
- 1988–1990: Marymont Warsaw
- 1990–1995: Polonia Warsaw

Senior career*
Years	Team	Apps	(Gls)
1993–1998	Polonia Warsaw		
1995–1996	→ Hutnik Warsaw (loan)		
1998–1999	Beveren	24	(1)
1999–2002	Mouscron	91	(4)
2002–2006	Anderlecht	94	(3)
2006–2010	Olympiacos	87	(3)
2010–2011	Ankaragücü	19	(1)
2011–2013	Legia Warsaw	44	(0)
Total		359	(12)

International career
1999–2011	Poland	102	(3)
- * Club domestic league appearances and goals

Michał Ryszard Żewłakow (Polish pronunciation: [ˈmixaw ʐɛvˈwakɔf]; born 22 April 1976) is a Polish football executive, pundit and former professional player who played as a defender. He was most recently the sporting director of Ekstraklasa club Legia Warsaw.

Żewłakow earned 102 caps for the Poland national team during a 13-year international career, served as captain from 2006, and represented his country at the 2002 and 2006 FIFA World Cups, as well as the UEFA Euro 2008, Poland's first appearance at the UEFA European Championship. He is Poland's third most capped player ever. Besides Poland, he has played in Belgium, Greece, and Turkey.

== Club career ==
=== Early career in Poland ===
Born in Warsaw in April 1976, Żewłakow spent eight years with Polonia Warsaw and broke into the first team in the 1996–97 season.

=== Belgium ===
Żewłakow moved to Belgian side KSK Beveren in October 1998 before signing – together with his twin brother Marcin – for Mouscron for a combined fee of €485,000 the following year. Żewłakow went on to become a key player, helping the club reach the 2002 Belgian Cup final.

=== Anderlecht ===
After following coach Hugo Broos to Anderlecht, in his second season he made his UEFA Champions League debut as Anderlecht wrested back the league title from Club Brugge. The next season, he lost his place but regained it for the 2005–06 campaign as Anderlecht won the league again.

=== Olympiacos ===
In the summer 2006, Żewłakow moved to Super League Greece club Olympiacos on a free transfer.

=== Ankaragücü ===
At the end of the 2009–10 season, after reportedly receiving a low contract offer from Olympiacos, Żewłakow decided not to renew his contract. On 16 June 2010, Turkish club Ankaragücü signed him on a free transfer.

=== Legia Warsaw ===
In June 2011, Żewłakow joined Polish club Legia Warsaw on a one-year contract.

== International career ==
The Poland national team's first-choice left-back during qualifying for the 2002 FIFA World Cup, Żewłakow was the only player to appear in all ten of his country's qualifying matches. He played in two games at the 2002 World Cup and was a regular in qualifying for UEFA EURO 2004 and the 2006 World Cup, where he again appeared three times in the finals in Germany.

== Post-playing career ==
Immediately after retiring at the end of the 2012–13 season, Żewłakow joined Legia Warsaw's executive staff as head of the scouting department, before being appointed sporting director in 2015.

Responsible for Legia's transfer activity, he oversaw the signings of Kasper Hämäläinen, Vadis Odjidja-Ofoe, Thibault Moulin, Krzysztof Mączyński, returns of Miroslav Radović, Artur Jędrzejczyk and Iñaki Astiz, among others. He left Legia on 13 September 2017, having helped win two league titles, one national cup and reach the 2016–17 UEFA Champions League group stage.

In June 2018, Żewłakow was appointed sporting director of fellow Ekstraklasa club Zagłębie Lubin, where he supervised the signings of players such as Damjan Bohar, Patryk Szysz, Saša Živec, and the appointment of Martin Ševela as manager. He left his post at the end of 2019.

On 19 August 2020, he joined Canal+ Sport's coverage team as a pundit and co-commentator.

On 3 November 2020, Żewłakow was announced as the new sporting director of II liga side Motor Lublin, a role he would hold concurrently with his position at Canal+. He left the club by mutual consent on 8 November 2021.

On 27 March 2025, Legia Warsaw confirmed that Żewłakow would be returning to the role of sporting director at the club, on a deal until the end of the 2026–27 season. He occupied this post until 25 May 2026.

== Personal life ==
Michał Żewłakow has a twin brother, Marcin, who played as a striker. They became the first twins ever to play together for Poland when they were picked in the starting lineup to face France in February 2000 and were teammates at the 2002 World Cup.

His son, Jakub, is also a professional footballer, who plays for Legia Warsaw.

== Career statistics ==
=== International ===
Appearances and goals by national team and year
National team	Year	Apps	Goals
Poland	1999	1	0
Poland	2000	10	0
Poland	2001	10	1
Poland	2002	9	0
Poland	2003	6	0
Poland	2004	8	0
Poland	2005	8	0
Poland	2006	11	0
Poland	2007	11	1
Poland	2008	10	1
Poland	2009	9	0
Poland	2010	8	0
Poland	2011	1	0
Total		102	3

Scores and results list Poland's goal tally first, score column indicates score after each Żewłakow goal.

List of international goals scored by Michał Żewłakow
No.	Date	Venue	Opponent	Score	Result	Competition
1	28 March 2001	Polish Army Stadium, Warsaw, Poland	Armenia	1–0	4–0	2002 FIFA World Cup qualification
2	7 February 2007	Estadio Municipal de Chapín, Jerez de la Frontera, Spain	Slovakia	1–2	2–2	Friendly
3	6 September 2008	Oporowska Stadium, Wrocław, Poland	Slovenia	1–0	1–1	2010 FIFA World Cup qualification

== Honours ==
Anderlecht

- Belgian Pro League: 2003–04, 2005–06

Olympiacos

- Super League Greece: 2006–07, 2007–08, 2008–09
- Greek Cup: 2007–08, 2008–09
- Greek Super Cup: 2007

Legia Warsaw

- Ekstraklasa: 2012–13
- Polish Cup: 2011–12, 2012–13

Individual

- Polish Newcomer of the Year: 2000

== See also ==
- List of footballers with 100 or more caps
