= Bartosz Karwan =

Polish footballer (born 1976)

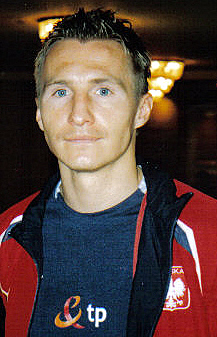

Personal information
- Date of birth: 13 January 1976 (age 50)
- Place of birth: Tychy, Poland
- Height: 1.80 m (5 ft 11 in)
- Position: Midfielder

Senior career*
Years	Team	Apps	(Gls)
1992–1993	GKS Tychy		
1993–1994	GKS Katowice	16	(1)
1994–1995	Anderlecht	0	(0)
1995–1997	GKS Katowice	60	(6)
1997–2002	Legia Warsaw	115	(31)
2002–2004	Hertha BSC	21	(0)
2004–2006	Legia Warsaw	31	(4)
2006–2010	Arka Gdynia	50	(10)
2010	OKS ZET Tychy		
2010–2011	GKS Katowice	11	(2)
2012	Mazur Karczew		

International career
1998–2005	Poland	22	(4)
- * Club domestic league appearances and goals

Bartosz Karwan (born 13 January 1976) is a Polish former professional footballer who played as a midfielder.

== Club career ==
Karwan was born in Tychy.

He spent two seasons in the Bundesliga with Hertha BSC.

In September 2010, he joined GKS Katowice. He was released one year later.

== International career ==
Karwan was a part of Poland national football team, for which he appeared 22 times and scored four goals.

== Honours ==
GKS Katowice

- Polish Super Cup: 1995

Legia Warsaw

- Ekstraklasa: 2001–02, 2005–06
- Polish Super Cup: 1997

Hertha BSC

- DFB-Ligapokal: 2002
