= KSZO Municipal Sports Stadium =

Football stadium in Ostrowiec Świętokrzyski, Poland

Coordinates: 50°55′28″N 21°22′46″E

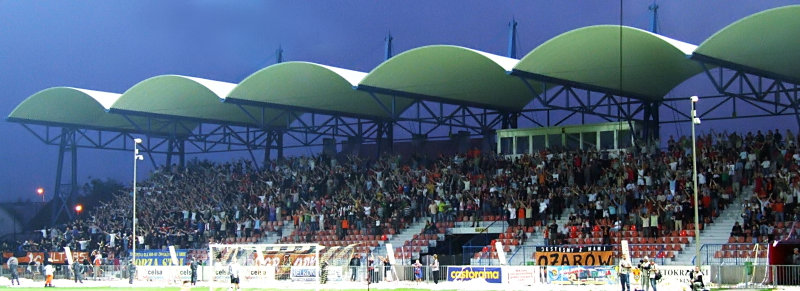
- Interactive map of KSZO Municipal Sports Stadium
- Location: Ostrowiec Świętokrzyski, Poland
- Owner: City of Ostrowiec Świętokrzyski
- Operator: KSZO Ostrowiec Świętokrzyski
- Capacity: 7,430
- Surface: Grass
- Field size: 105 m x 74 m

Construction
- Built: 1931–1934
- Renovated: from 1997

Tenant
- KSZO Ostrowiec Świętokrzyski

The KSZO Municipal Sports Stadium (Polish: Miejski Stadion Sportowy "KSZO" w Ostrowcu Świętokrzyskim) is a football stadium in Ostrowiec Świętokrzyski, Poland. It is the home ground of KSZO Ostrowiec Świętokrzyski. The stadium holds 7,430 people.
