= Estadio Iberoamericano =

Stadium in San Fernando, Spain

Iberoamericano 2010
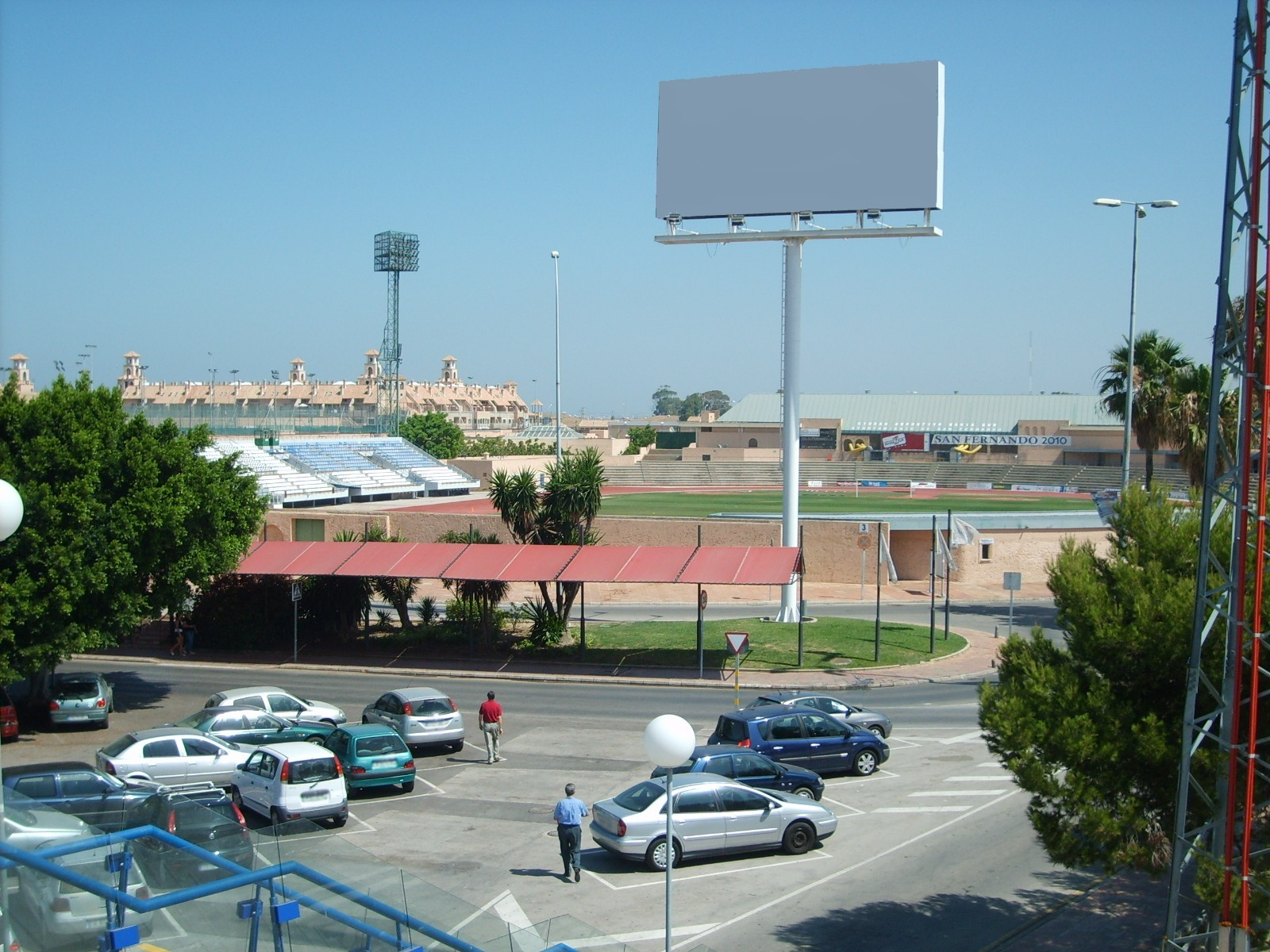
- Interactive map of Iberoamericano 2010
- Former names: Estadio Bahía Sur (1992–2010)
- Location: San Fernando, Spain
- Coordinates: 36°28′12″N 6°12′26″W
- Owner: Ayuntamiento de San Fernando
- Operator: Ayuntamiento de San Fernando
- Capacity: 8,021
- Field size: 105 metres (115 yd) x 70 metres (77 yd)

Construction
- Opened: November 22, 1992

Tenant
- San Fernando CD

Estadio Iberoamericano, formerly known as Estadio Bahía Sur, is a multi-sport stadium located in San Fernando, Province of Cádiz, Andalusia, Spain. It was inaugurated on November 22, 1992, with a soccer game between San Fernando CD and Montilla CF.

Property of the municipality, it is the home stadium of CD San Fernando. It is equipped with both an artificial grass and natural grass surface. Its capacity is 8,000 spectators.

The stadium was constructed as a replacement for CD San Fernando's previous field, Campo de Deportes Marqués de Varela, that it has become outdated.

It hosted the XIV Campeonato Iberoamericano de Atletismo in 2010, and underwent considerable refurbishment. This included the addition of a roof over the main stand, new seating and athletics track.
