= Marcin Żewłakow =

Polish footballer

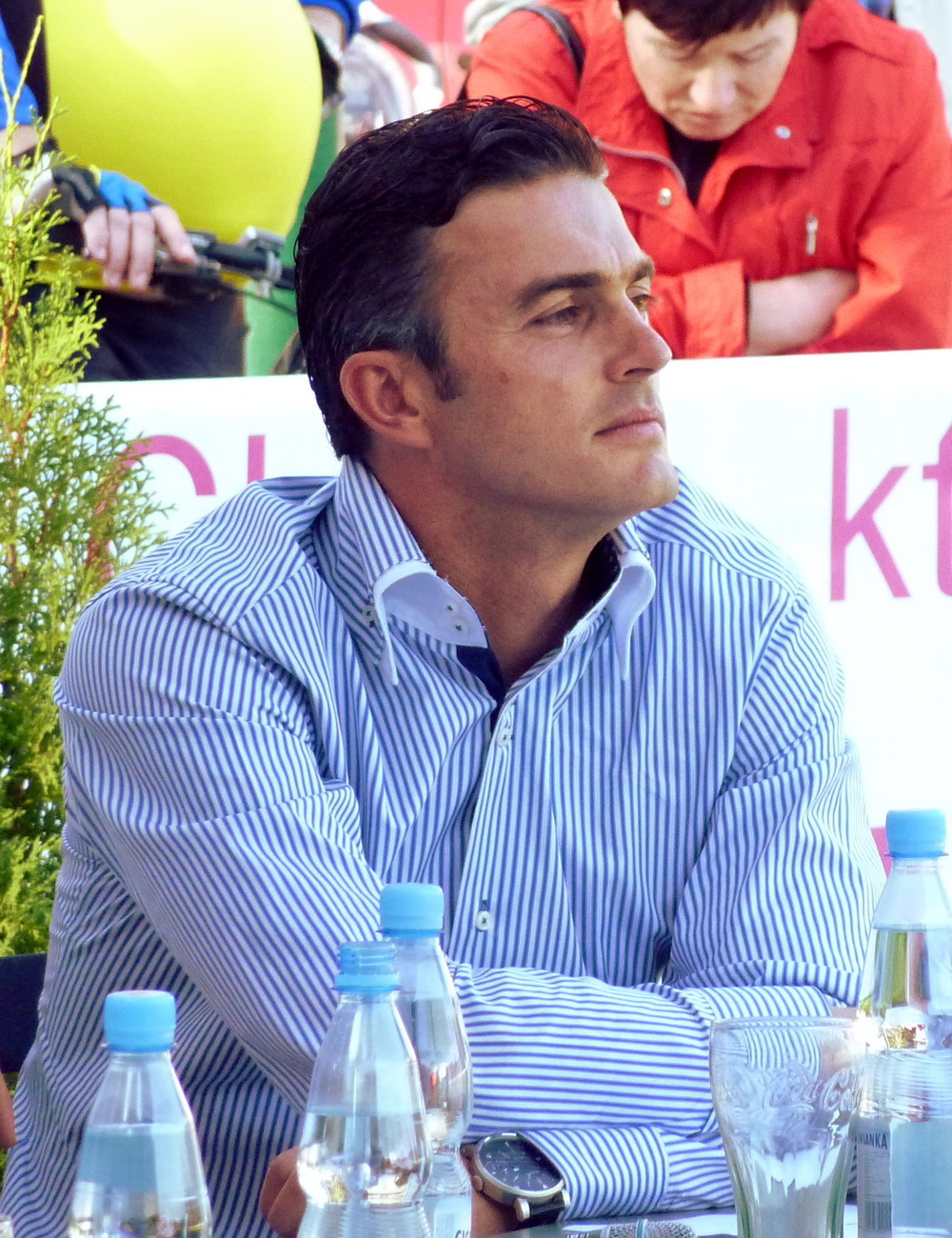
- Żewłakow in 2011

Personal information
- Full name: Marcin Żewłakow
- Date of birth: 22 April 1976 (age 50)
- Place of birth: Warsaw, Poland
- Height: 1.83 m (6 ft 0 in)
- Position: Forward

Senior career*
Years	Team	Apps	(Gls)
1991–1992	Drukarz Warsaw	3	(0)
1992–1993	Marymont Warsaw	7	(1)
1993–1998	Polonia Warsaw	88	(8)
1995–1996	→ Hutnik Warsaw (loan)		
1998–1999	Beveren	23	(8)
1999–2006	Excelsior Mouscron	177	(81)
2005–2006	→ Metz (loan)	13	(0)
2006–2008	Gent	18	(3)
2008	→ Dender (loan)	7	(2)
2008–2010	APOEL	43	(14)
2010–2012	GKS Bełchatów	51	(12)
2012–2013	Korona Kielce	13	(1)
Total		443	(130)

International career
2000–2004	Poland	25	(5)
- * Club domestic league appearances and goals

Marcin Żewłakow (Polish pronunciation: [ˈmart͡ɕin ʑɛvˈwakɔf]) (born 22 April 1976) is a Polish football pundit, co-commentator and former professional player who played as a forward.

== Club career ==
Żewłakow was born in Warsaw. He played for clubs such as Polonia Warsaw, Belgian sides Beveren, Excelsior Mouscron and Gent, French club Metz and APOEL in Cyprus.

With APOEL, he won the 2008–09 Cypriot First Division and the 2008 Cypriot Super Cup. He also appeared in three group stage matches of the 2009–10 UEFA Champions League with the Cypriot outfit, scoring one goal against Chelsea in a 2–2 draw at Stamford Bridge.

== International career ==
He also played for the Poland national team, scoring five goals in 25 international appearances. He played at the 2002 FIFA World Cup, and scored a goal in a 3–1 group stage win over the United States.

== Personal life ==
His twin brother Michał was also a footballer. They were teammates at Polonia, Beveren and Mouscron and the national team, playing together at the 2002 FIFA World Cup.

== Career statistics ==
=== International ===
Appearances and goals by national team and year
National team	Year	Apps	Goals
Poland
Poland	2000	4	0
Poland	2001	9	3
Poland	2002	11	2
Poland	2004	1	0
Total		25	5

Scores and results list Poland's goal tally first, score column indicates score after each Żewłakow goal.

List of international goals scored by Marcin Żewłakow
No.	Date	Venue	Opponent	Score	Result	Competition
1	28 March 2001	Stadion Wojska Polskiego, Warsaw, Poland	Armenia	3–0	4–0	2002 FIFA World Cup qualification
2	1 September 2001	Stadion Śląski, Chorzów, Poland	Norway	3–0	3–0	2002 FIFA World Cup qualification
3	5 September 2001	Dinamo Stadium, Minsk, Belarus	Belarus	1–4	1–4	2002 FIFA World Cup qualification
4	13 February 2002	Tsirion Stadium, Limassol, Cyprus	Northern Ireland	4–1	4–1	Friendly
5	14 June 2002	World Cup Stadium, Daejeon, South Korea	United States	3–0	3–1	2002 FIFA World Cup

== Honours ==
APOEL

- Cypriot First Division: 2008–09
- Cypriot Super Cup: 2008
