= Belarus national football team results (1992–2009) =

This is a list of Belarus national football team results from 1992 to the 2009.

== 1990s ==
=== 1992 ===
28 October International Friendly	Belarus	1–1	Ukraine	Minsk, Belarus
17:30 UTC+2	Gotsmanov 49'	Report	Maksymov 78'	Stadium: Dinamo Stadium; Attendance: 10,000; Referee: Aleksey Spirin (Russia)

=== 1993 ===
27 January International Friendly	Ecuador	1–1	Belarus	Guayaquil, Ecuador
21:00 UTC-4	Fernández 38'	Report	Herasimets 69'	Stadium: Estadio Monumental Isidro Romero Carbo; Attendance: 38,000; Referee: Elías Jácome Guerrero (Ecuador)

30 January International Friendly	Peru	1–1	Belarus	Lima, Peru
20:00 UTC-5	Baroni 14'	Report	Arlowski 3'	Stadium: Estadio Nacional; Attendance: 10,000; Referee: Antonio Arnao Ortega Lima (Peru)

=== 1994 ===
25 May International Friendly	Ukraine	3–1	Belarus	Kyiv, Ukraine
19:00 UTC+3	Leonenko 62'; Bezhenar 65' (pen.); Mykhaylenko 82'	Report	Byalkevich 45'	Stadium: Olimpiyskiy National Sports Complex; Attendance: 12,000; Referee: Kostyantyn Panchyk (Ukraine)

17 August International Friendly	Poland	1–1	Belarus	Radom, Poland
17:00 UTC+2	Bąk 37'	Report	Vyarheychyk 38'	Stadium: Radomiak Radom; Attendance: 7,000; Referee: Hartmut Strampe (Germany)

7 September UEFA Euro 1996 qualifying Group 5	Norway	1–0	Belarus	Oslo, Norway
20:00 UTC+2	Frigård 88'	Report		Stadium: Ullevaal Stadion; Attendance: 16,739; Referee: Guy Goethals (Belgium)

12 October UEFA Euro 1996 qualifying Group 5	Belarus	2–0	Luxembourg	Minsk, Belarus
20:00 UTC+2	Romaschenko 68'; Herasimets 76'	Report		Stadium: Dinamo Stadium; Attendance: 6,549; Referee: Richard O'Hanlon (Ireland)

16 November UEFA Euro 1996 qualifying Group 5	Belarus	0–4	Norway	Minsk, Belarus
19:00 UTC+2		Report	Berg 34'; Leonhardsen 39'; Bohinen 52'; Rekdal 83' (pen.)	Stadium: Dinamo Stadium; Attendance: 5,711; Referee: Lube Spasov (Bulgaria)

=== 1995 ===
29 March UEFA Euro 1996 qualifying Group 5	Czech Republic	4–2	Belarus	Ostrava, Czech Republic
16:30 UTC+2	Kadlec 5'; Berger 17', 62'; Kuka 68'		Herasimets 45' (pen.); Hurynovich 88'	Stadium: Bazaly; Attendance: 5,549; Referee: Gilles Veissière (France)

26 April UEFA Euro 1996 qualifying Group 5	Belarus	1–1	Malta	Minsk, Belarus
19:00 UTC+3	Taykow 57'		Carabott 71'	Stadium: Dinamo Stadium; Attendance: 6,915; Referee: Ladislav Gadoši (Slovakia)

7 June UEFA Euro 1996 qualifying Group 5	Belarus	1–0	Netherlands	Minsk, Belarus
20:00 UTC+3	Herasimets 27'	Report		Stadium: Dinamo Stadium; Attendance: 28,000; Referee: Adrian Porumboiu (Romania)

29 July International Friendly	Lithuania	1–1	Belarus	Vilnius, Lithuania
18:00 UTC+3	Skarbalius 11'	Report	Kachura 73' (pen.)	Stadium: Žalgirio Stadionas; Attendance: 1,000; Referee: Romāns Lajuks (Latvia)

6 September UEFA Euro 1996 qualifying Group 5	Netherlands	1–0	Belarus	Rotterdam, Netherlands
20:15 UTC+2	Mulder 83'	Report		Stadium: De Kuip; Attendance: 18,830; Referee: Robert Sedlacek (Austria)

7 October UEFA Euro 1996 qualifying Group 5	Belarus	0–2	Czech Republic	Minsk, Belarus
18:00 UTC+2		Report	Frýdek 25'; Berger 84'	Stadium: Dinamo Stadium; Attendance: 9,500; Referee: Anders Frisk (Sweden)

11 October UEFA Euro 1996 qualifying Group 5	Luxembourg	0–0	Belarus	Luxembourg City, Luxembourg
20:00 UTC+1		Report		Stadium: Stade Josy Barthel; Attendance: 4,272; Referee: Paul Durkin (England)

12 November UEFA Euro 1996 qualifying Group 5	Malta	0–2	Belarus	Ta' Qali, Malta
15:00 UTC+1		Report	Herasimets 79', 83'	Stadium: Ta' Qali National Stadium; Attendance: 3,025; Referee: Metin Tokat (Turkey)

=== 1996 ===
14 February International Friendly	Turkey	3–2	Belarus	İzmir, Turkey
20:00 (UTC+2)	Sağlam 26' (pen.), 34' (pen.); Şentürk 76'	Report	Byalkevich 8'; Shtanyuk 49'	Stadium: İzmir Atatürk Stadyumu; Attendance: 6,732; Referee: Vanco Kocev (Macedonia)

27 March International Friendly	Slovakia	4–0	Belarus	Nitra, Slovakia
15:30 (UTC+1)	Július Šimon 24'; Timko 32'; Ujlaky 61'; Juriga 83'	Report		Stadium: Štadión pod Zoborom; Attendance: 3,058; Referee: Marek Kowalczyk (Poland)

1 May International Friendly	Poland	1–1	Belarus	Mielec, Poland
17:15 (UTC+2)	Kowalczyk 8'	Report	Kachura 61'	Stadium: Stadion Stali Mielec; Attendance: 5,000; Referee: Hermann Albrecht (Germany)

27 May International Friendly	Belarus	2–2	Azerbaijan	Maladzyechna, Belarus
17:30 (UTC+3)	Kachura 49' (pen.); Kulchy 59'	Report	Qurbanov 53'; İdiqov 75'	Stadium: City Stadium; Attendance: 5,200; Referee: Sergejus Slyva (Lithuania)

1 June 1998 FIFA World Cup Qualifying Group 4	Sweden	5–1	Belarus	Stockholm, Sweden
18:30 (UTC+2)	K. Andersson 20', 62' (pen.); Dahlin 30'; P. Andersson 77'; Larsson 87'	Report	Byalkevich 75'	Stadium: Råsunda Stadium; Attendance: 30,014; Referee: Rémi Harrel (France)

31 July International Friendly	Belarus	2–2	Lithuania	Minsk, Belarus
18:30 (UTC+3)	Kulchy 24'; Vasilyew 88'	Report	Buitkus 12'; Gvildys 80'	Stadium: Dinamo Stadium; Attendance: 1,000; Referee: Genadz Yakubovskiy (Belarus)

20 August International Friendly	United Arab Emirates	1–0	Belarus	Fürth, Germany
18:00 (UTC+2)	Mubarak 15'	Report		Stadium: Sportpark Ronhof; Attendance: 100; Referee: Hermann Albrecht (Germany)

31 August 1998 FIFA World Cup Qualifying Group 4	Belarus	1–0	Estonia	Minsk, Belarus
18:30 (UTC+3)	Makowski 35'	Report		Stadium: Dinamo Stadium; Attendance: 7,500; Referee: Sergei Khusainov (Russia)

5 October 1998 FIFA World Cup Qualifying Group 4	Estonia	1–0	Belarus	Tallinn, Estonia
15:00 (UTC+3)	Hohlov-Simson 52'	Report		Stadium: Kadriorg Stadium; Attendance: 1,500; Referee: Richard O'Hanlon (Republic of Ireland)

9 October 1998 FIFA World Cup Qualifying Group 4	Belarus	1–1	Latvia	Minsk, Belarus
18:30 (UTC+3)	Makowski 78'	Report	Zemļinskis 16'	Stadium: Dinamo Stadium; Attendance: 7,300; Referee: Sergo Kvaratskhelia (Georgia)

=== 1997 ===
5 January International Friendly	Egypt	2–0	Belarus	Alexandria, Egypt
15:00 UTC+2	Hassan 25'; Sari 80'	Report		Stadium: Alexandria Stadium; Attendance: 10,000; Referee: Abdulhamid Radwan Abdulkareem (Egypt)

30 April 1998 FIFA World Cup Qualifying Group 4	Latvia	2–0	Belarus	Riga, Latvia
17:00 UTC+3	Ševļakovs 38', 83'	Report		Stadium: Daugava Stadium; Attendance: 4,200; Referee: Ilkka Koho (Finland)

8 June 1998 FIFA World Cup Qualifying Group 4	Belarus	0–1	Scotland	Minsk, Belarus
17:00 UTC+3		Report	McAllister 49' (pen.)	Stadium: Dinamo Stadium; Attendance: 12,000; Referee: Ahmet Çakar (Turkey)

5 August International Friendly	Belarus	2–3	Israel	Minsk, Belarus
19:00 UTC+3	Skrypchanka 73'; Ryndzyuk 90'	Report	Hazan 47'; Nimni 71'; Mizrahi 88'	Stadium: Dinamo Stadium; Attendance: 4,000; Referee: Serhiy Tatulyan (Ukraine)

20 August 1998 FIFA World Cup Qualifying Group 4	Belarus	1–2	Sweden	Minsk, Belarus
20:30 UTC+3	Gurenko 38'	Report	K. Andersson 74'; Zetterberg 84'	Stadium: Dinamo Stadium; Attendance: 9,000; Referee: Dermot Gallagher (England)

7 September 1998 FIFA World Cup Qualifying Group 4	Scotland	4–1	Belarus	Aberdeen, Scotland
14:00 UTC+1	Gallacher 7', 58'; Hopkin 54', 88'	Report	Kachuro 73' (pen.)	Stadium: Pittodrie Stadium; Attendance: 20,160; Referee: Mario van der Ende (Netherlands)

10 September 1998 FIFA World Cup Qualifying Group 4	Belarus	0–1	Austria	Minsk, Belarus
19:00 UTC+3		Report	Pfeifenberger 50'	Stadium: Dinamo Stadium; Attendance: 7,000; Referee: Serge Muhmenthaler (Switzerland)

11 October 1998 FIFA World Cup Qualifying Group 4	Austria	4–0	Belarus	Vienna, Austria
16:00 UTC+2	Polster 3', 16' (pen.); Stöger 6', 42'	Report		Stadium: Ernst Happel Stadion; Attendance: 48,500; Referee: Aron Huzu (Romania)

=== 1998 ===
7 June International Friendly	Belarus	5–0	Lithuania	Minsk, Belarus
18:00 UTC+3	Arlowski 10'; Herasimets 45'; Makowski 54'; Baranaw 66'; Ramashchanka 81'	Report		Stadium: Dinamo Stadium; Attendance: 6,500; Referee: Andrey Butenko (Russia)

19 August International Friendly	Lithuania	0–3	Belarus	Vilnius, Lithuania
18:00 UTC+3		Report	Astrowski 41'; Makowski 44'; Ramashchanka 78'	Stadium: Žalgirio Stadionas; Attendance: 700; Referee: Anatolijus Rezepovas (Lithuania)

5 September UEFA Euro 2000 qualifying Group 1	Belarus	0–0	Denmark	Minsk, Belarus
20:30 UTC+3		Report		Stadium: Dinamo Stadium; Attendance: 34,000; Referee: Georg Dardenne (Germany)

14 October UEFA Euro 2000 qualifying Group 1	Wales	3–2	Belarus	Cardiff, Wales
19:30 UTC+1	Robinson 14'; Coleman 53'; Symons 84'	Report	Gurenko 20'; Byalkevich 48'	Stadium: Ninian Park; Attendance: 11,975; Referee: Lawrence Sammut (Malta)

=== 1999 ===
9 February International Friendly	Israel	2–1	Belarus	Haifa, Israel
18:30 UTC+2	Nimni 20', 51'	Report	Baranaw 28'	Stadium: Kiryat Eliezer Stadium; Attendance: 7,500; Referee: Sorin Corpodean (Romania)

27 March UEFA Euro 2000 qualifying Group 1	Belarus	0–1	Switzerland	Minsk, Belarus
18:30 UTC+2		Report	Fournier 72'	Stadium: Dinamo Stadium; Attendance: 37,000; Referee: Oğuz Sarvan (Turkey)

31 March UEFA Euro 2000 qualifying Group 1	Italy	1–1	Belarus	Ancona, Italy
20:45 UTC+2	Inzaghi 31' (pen.)	Report	Byalkevich 24'	Stadium: Stadio del Conero; Attendance: 20,735; Referee: Michel Piraux (Belgium)

19 May International Friendly	Russia	1–1	Belarus	Tula, Russia
18:00 UTC+4	Mostovoi 31'	Report	Tarlowski 46'	Stadium: Central Stadium Arsenal; Attendance: 12,000; Referee: Gercas Žakas (Lithuania)

5 June UEFA Euro 2000 qualifying Group 1	Denmark	1–0	Belarus	Copenhagen, Denmark
20:15 UTC+2	Heintze 22'	Report		Stadium: Parken Stadium; Attendance: 24,876; Referee: Lucilio Batista (Portugal)

18 August International Friendly	Belarus	0–2	Russia	Minsk, Belarus
19:00 UTC+3		Report	Beschastnykh 38'; Panov 47'	Stadium: Dinamo Stadium; Attendance: 17,000; Referee: Andrei Iacovlev (Moldova)

4 September UEFA Euro 2000 qualifying Group 1	Belarus	1–2	Wales	Minsk, Belarus
17:00 UTC+3	Baranov 30'	Report	Saunders 42'; Giggs 86'	Stadium: Dinamo Stadium; Attendance: 25,000; Referee: Tom Henning Øvrebø (Norway)

8 September UEFA Euro 2000 qualifying Group 1	Switzerland	2–0	Belarus	Lausanne, Switzerland
20:15 UTC+2	Türkyilmaz 68', 86' (pen.)	Report		Stadium: Stade Olympique de la Pontaise; Attendance: 12,500; Referee: Leslie Irvine (Republic of Ireland)

9 October UEFA Euro 2000 qualifying Group 1	Belarus	0–0	Italy	Minsk, Belarus
20:30 UTC+3		Report		Stadium: Dinamo Stadium; Attendance: 32,000; Referee: Claude Colombo (France)

== 2000s ==
=== 2000 ===
29 March International Friendly	Bulgaria	4–1	Belarus	Sofia, Bulgaria
18:00 UTC+3	Todorov 23'; Donkov 42'; Petkov 61'; Petrov 80'	Report	Skrypchanka 57'	Stadium: Georgi Asparuhov Stadium; Attendance: 2,000; Referee: Jozef Kačenga (Slovakia)

26 April International Friendly	Andorra	2–0	Belarus	Andorra la Vella, Andorra
21:00 UTC+2	Lucendo 57' (pen.); Sánchez 62'	Report		Stadium: Estadi Comunal d'Aixovall; Attendance: 500; Referee: Arturo Daudén Ibáñez (Spain)

4 June International Friendly	Estonia	2–0	Belarus	Tallinn, Estonia
17:00 UTC+2	Oper 4', 80'	Report		Stadium: Kadrioru Staadion; Attendance: 550; Referee: Petteri Kari (Finland)

16 August International Friendly	Latvia	0–1	Belarus	Riga, Latvia
17:00 UTC+2		Report	Vasilyuk 50'	Stadium: Skonto Stadium; Attendance: 4,500; Referee: Oleg Timofejev (Estonia)

2 September 2002 FIFA World Cup qualifying Group 5	Belarus	2–1	Wales	Minsk, Belarus
17:00 UTC+3	Khatskevich 39'; Belkevich 56'	Report	Speed 90+3'	Stadium: Dinamo Stadium; Attendance: 32,000; Referee: Alfredo Trentalange (Italy)

7 October 2002 FIFA World Cup qualifying Group 5	Poland	3–1	Belarus	Łódź, Poland
20:00 UTC+2	Kałużny 24', 63', 74'	Report	Ryndzyuk 37'	Stadium: Stadion Widzewa; Attendance: 7,638; Referee: Anders Frisk (Sweden)

11 October 2002 FIFA World Cup qualifying Group 5	Belarus	2–1	Armenia	Minsk, Belarus
18:00 UTC+3	Khatskevich 23'; Ryndzyuk 34'	Report	Khojoyan 50'	Stadium: Dinamo Stadium; Attendance: 21,700; Referee: Sorin Corpodean (Romania)

=== 2001 ===
24 March 2002 FIFA World Cup qualifying Group 5	Ukraine	0–0	Belarus	Kyiv, Ukraine
19:00 UTC+2		Report		Stadium: Olimpiyskiy National Sports Complex; Attendance: 75,000; Referee: Juan Fernández Marín (Spain)

28 March 2002 FIFA World Cup qualifying Group 5	Belarus	2–1	Norway	Minsk, Belarus
20:00 UTC+3	Khatskevich 19'; Vasilyuk 90+1'	Report	Solskjær 68'	Stadium: Dinamo Stadium; Attendance: 39,000; Referee: Kyros Vassaras (Greece)

2 June 2002 FIFA World Cup qualifying Group 5	Armenia	0–0	Belarus	Yerevan, Armenia
20:00 UTC+5		Report		Stadium: Vazgen Sargsyan Republican Stadium; Attendance: 6,400; Referee: Anton Guenov (Bulgaria)

6 June 2002 FIFA World Cup qualifying Group 5	Norway	1–1	Belarus	Oslo, Norway
19:00 UTC+2	Carew 81'	Report	Belkevich 24'	Stadium: Ullevaal Stadion; Attendance: 17,164; Referee: Miroslav Radoman (FR Yugoslavia)

1 September 2002 FIFA World Cup qualifying Group 5	Belarus	0–2	Ukraine	Minsk, Belarus
19:00 UTC+3		Report	Shevchenko 45', 57'	Stadium: Dinamo Stadium; Attendance: 37,000; Referee: Alain Sars (France)

5 September 2002 FIFA World Cup qualifying Group 5	Belarus	4–1	Poland	Minsk, Belarus
21:00 UTC+3	Vasilyuk 7', 46', 52', 61'	Report	Marcin Żewłakow 78'	Stadium: Dinamo Stadium; Attendance: 24,302; Referee: Konrad Plautz (Austria)

6 October 2002 FIFA World Cup qualifying Group 5	Wales	1–0	Belarus	Cardiff, Wales
14:30 UTC+1	Hartson 47'	Report		Stadium: Millennium Stadium; Attendance: 10,201; Referee: Pasquale Rodomonti (Italy)

=== 2002 ===
17 April International Friendly	Hungary	2–5	Belarus	Debrecen, Hungary
17:30 UTC+2	Kenesei 13'; Fehér 86' (pen.)	Report	A. Hleb 23'; Kutuzov 29', 33'; Khatskevich 45'; Kachura 76'	Stadium: Oláh Gábor utcai Stadion; Attendance: 4,000; Referee: Salomir Mircea (Romania)

17 May 2002 LG Cup	Russia	1–1 (4–5 p)	Belarus	Moscow, Russia
20:00 UTC+4	Solomatin 28' (pen.)	Report 1 Report 2	Byalkevich 15'	Stadium: Dinamo Stadium; Attendance: 16,000; Referee: Viktor Kassai (Hungary)
	Penalties
	Khokhlov (penalty missed); Nikiforov (penalty missed); Semshov (penalty scored); Semak (penalty missed); Solomatin (penalty scored); Karyaka (penalty scored); Alenichev (penalty scored); Pimenov (penalty missed)		(penalty missed) Kulchy; (penalty missed) Shtanyuk; (penalty scored) Byalkevich; (penalty missed) Romaschenko; (penalty scored) Hleb; (penalty scored) Astrowski; (penalty scored) Amelyanchuk; (penalty scored) Kowba

19 May 2002 LG Cup	Belarus	2–0	Ukraine	Moscow, Russia
16:00 UTC+4	Byalkevich 48'; A. Hleb 63'	Report		Stadium: Dinamo Stadium; Attendance: 4,000; Referee: Paulius Malžinskas (Lithuania)

21 August International Friendly	Latvia	2–4	Belarus	Riga, Latvia
19:00 UTC+3	Verpakovskis 17'; Laizāns 26'	Report	Kutuzov; Kulchy 30'; Ramashchanka 64', 86'	Stadium: Skonto Stadium; Attendance: 4,200; Referee: Hannes Kaasik (Estonia)

7 September UEFA Euro 2004 qualifying Group 3	Netherlands	3–0	Belarus	Eindhoven, Netherlands
20:30 UTC+2	Davids 35'; Kluivert 37'; Hasselbaink 73'	Report		Stadium: Philips Stadion; Attendance: 34,000; Referee: Graham Barber (England)

12 October UEFA Euro 2004 qualifying Group 3	Belarus	0–2	Austria	Minsk, Belarus
18:30 UTC+3		Report	Schopp 58'; Akagündüz 88'	Stadium: Dinamo Stadium; Attendance: 17,009; Referee: Eric Poulat (France)

16 October UEFA Euro 2004 qualifying Group 3	Czech Republic	2–0	Belarus	Teplice, Czech Republic
16:30 UTC+2	Poborský 6'; Baroš 23'	Report		Stadium: Na Stínadlech; Attendance: 12,850; Referee: Helmut Fleischer (Germany)

=== 2003 ===
29 March UEFA Euro 2004 qualifying Group 3	Belarus	2–1	Moldova	Minsk, Belarus
18:30 UTC+2	Kutuzov 43'; Gurenko 58'	Report	Cebotari 14'	Stadium: Dinamo Stadium; Attendance: 7,700; Referee: Johan Verbist (Belgium)

2 April International Friendly	Belarus	2–2	Uzbekistan	Minsk, Belarus
18:30 UTC+3	Tsyhalka 26'; Razhkow 52'	Report	Khvostunov 66' (pen.); Geynrikh 69'	Stadium: Dinamo Stadium; Attendance: 4,000; Referee: Romāns Lajuks (Latvia)

30 April International Friendly	Uzbekistan	1–2	Belarus	Tashkent, Uzbekistan
17:30 UTC+5	Shishelov 43'	Report	Shuneyka 15'; Kutuzov 53'	Stadium: Pakhtakor Central Stadium; Attendance: 4,000

7 June UEFA Euro 2004 qualifying Group 3	Belarus	0–2	Netherlands	Minsk, Belarus
21:00 UTC+3		Report	Overmars 61'; Kluivert 68'	Stadium: Dinamo Stadium; Attendance: 19,309; Referee: Tom Henning Øvrebø (Norway)

11 June UEFA Euro 2004 qualifying Group 3	Austria	5–0	Belarus	Innsbruck, Austria
20:30 UTC+2	Aufhauser 33'; Haas 47'; Kirchler 53'; Wallner 62'; Cerny 70'	Report		Stadium: Tivoli Neu; Attendance: 8,100; Referee: Peter Fröjdfeldt (Sweden)

20 August International Friendly	Belarus	2–1	Iran	Minsk, Belarus
19:00 UTC+3	Ramashchanka 9'; Shtanyuk 41'	Report	Nouri 84'	Stadium: Dinamo Stadium; Attendance: 10,000; Referee: Nikolay Ivanov (Russia)

6 September UEFA Euro 2004 qualifying Group 3	Belarus	1–3	Czech Republic	Minsk, Belarus
18:30 UTC+3	Bulyha 14'	Report	Nedvěd 37'; Baroš 54'; Šmicer 85'	Stadium: Dinamo Stadium; Attendance: 7,500; Referee: Mike McCurry (Scotland)

10 September UEFA Euro 2004 qualifying Group 3	Moldova	2–1	Belarus	Tiraspol, Moldova
19:00 UTC+3	Dadu 26'; Covalciuc 87'	Report	Vasilyuk 90' (pen.)	Stadium: Sheriff Stadium; Attendance: 7,000; Referee: Dejan Delević (Serbia and Montenegro)

=== 2004 ===
18 February 2004 Cyprus Football Tournament Quarter-finals	Cyprus	0–2	Belarus	Nicosia, Cyprus
15:00 UTC+2		Report	Ramashchanka 56', 70'	Stadium: Dasaki Stadium; Attendance: 250; Referee: Panikos Kailis (Cyprus)

19 February 2004 Cyprus Football Tournament Semi-finals	Romania	2–0	Belarus	Nicosia, Cyprus
15:00 UTC+2		Report	Danciulescu 32' (pen.); Niculae 49'	Stadium: GSP Stadium; Attendance: 150; Referee: Kostas Theodotou (Cyprus)

21 February 2004 Cyprus Football Tournament; Third place play-off	Latvia	1–4	Belarus	Larnaca, Cyprus
13:30 UTC+2	Zemļinskis 37' (pen.)	Report	Bulyga 20'; Ramashchanka 67' (pen.), 86' (pen.), 90+1'	Stadium: GSP Stadium; Attendance: 30; Referee: Kostas Theodotou (Cyprus)

28 April International Friendly	Belarus	1–0	Lithuania	Minsk, Belarus
19:00 UTC+3	Bliznyuk 76'	Report		Stadium: Dinamo Stadium; Attendance: 12,000; Referee: Valentin Ivanov (Russia)

18 August International Friendly	Turkey	1–2	Belarus	Denizli, Turkey
20:00 UTC+3	Şükür 13'	Report	V. Hleb 67'; Kowba 90+1'	Stadium: Atatürk Olympic Stadium; Attendance: 15,000; Referee: Rusmir Mrković (Bosnia and Herzegovina)

8 September 2006 FIFA World Cup qualifying Group 5	Norway	1–1	Belarus	Oslo, Norway
20:00 UTC+2	Riseth 39'	Report	Kutuzov 78'	Stadium: Ullevaal Stadion; Attendance: 25,272; Referee: Paulo Costa (Portugal)

9 October 2006 FIFA World Cup qualifying Group 5	Belarus	4–0	Moldova	Minsk, Belarus
19:00 UTC+3	Omelyanchuk 45'; Kutuzov 65'; Bulyha 75'; Romaschenko 90+1'	Report		Stadium: Dinamo Stadium; Attendance: 18,426; Referee: Selçuk Dereli (Turkey)

13 October 2006 FIFA World Cup qualifying Group 5	Italy	4–3	Belarus	Parma, Italy
21:00 UTC+2	Totti 26' (pen.), 74'; De Rossi 32'; Gilardino 86'	Report	Romaschenko 52', 88'; Bulyga 76'	Stadium: Stadio Ennio Tardini; Attendance: 16,510; Referee: Carlos Megía Dávila (Spain)

22 November International Friendly	United Arab Emirates	2–3	Belarus	Abu Dhabi, United Arab Emirates
18:00 UTC+4	Abdulla 21'; Masoud 75'	Report	Shkabara 44'; Kovel 60'; Kulchy 91'	Stadium: Al Jazira Mohammed Bin Zayed Stadium; Attendance: 600; Referee: Abdul Al Delawar (Bahrain)

=== 2005 ===
9 February International Friendly	Poland	1–3	Belarus	Grodzisk Wielkopolski, Poland
20:00 UTC+1	Żurawski 51'	Report	A. Hleb 8'; V. Hleb 84'; Lavrik 90'	Stadium: Dyskobolia Stadium; Attendance: 3,600; Referee: Audrius Žuta (Lithuania)

30 March 2006 FIFA World Cup qualifying Group 5	Slovenia	1–1	Belarus	Celje, Slovenia
20:15 UTC+2	Rodić 44'	Report	Kulchiy 49'	Stadium: Arena Petrol; Attendance: 6,450; Referee: Khalil Al Ghamdi (Saudi Arabia)

4 June 2006 FIFA World Cup qualifying Group 5	Belarus	1–1	Slovenia	Minsk, Belarus
20:00 UTC+3	Belkevich 18'	Report	Čeh 17'	Stadium: Dinamo Stadium; Attendance: 29,042; Referee: Martin Hansson (Sweden)

8 June 2006 FIFA World Cup qualifying Group 5	Belarus	0–0	Scotland	Minsk, Belarus
21:00 UTC+3		Report		Stadium: Dinamo Stadium; Attendance: 28,287; Referee: Olegário Benquerença (Portugal)

17 August International Friendly	Lithuania	1–0	Belarus	Vilnius, Lithuania
19:00 UTC+3	Česnauskis 45'	Report		Stadium: LFF Stadium; Attendance: 2,500; Referee: Andrejs Sipailo (Latvia)

3 September 2006 FIFA World Cup qualifying Group 5	Moldova	2–0	Belarus	Chişinău, Moldova
19:00 UTC+3	Rogaciov 17', 49'	Report		Stadium: Stadionul Republican; Attendance: 5,000; Referee: Laurent Duhamel (France)

7 September 2006 FIFA World Cup qualifying Group 5	Belarus	1–4	Italy	Minsk, Belarus
20:00 UTC+3	Kutuzov 4'	Report	Toni 6', 14', 55'; Camoranesi 45'	Stadium: Dinamo Stadium; Attendance: 30,299; Referee: René Temmink (Netherlands)

8 October 2006 FIFA World Cup qualifying Group 5	Scotland	0–1	Belarus	Glasgow, Scotland
15:00 UTC+1		Report	Kutuzov 6'	Stadium: Hampden Park; Attendance: 51,105; Referee: Zsolt Szabó (Hungary)

12 October 2006 FIFA World Cup qualifying Group 5	Belarus	0–1	Norway	Minsk, Belarus
21:30 UTC+3		Report	Helstad 70'	Stadium: Dinamo Stadium; Attendance: 13,222; Referee: Konrad Plautz (Austria)

12 November International Friendly	Belarus	3–1	Latvia	Vitebsk, Belarus
15:00 UTC+2	Karytska 27'; Karnilenka 52', 90'	Report	Višņakovs 24'	Stadium: Vitebsky Central Sport Complex; Attendance: 8,300; Referee: Igor Egorov (Russia)

=== 2006 ===
28 February 2006 Cyprus Football Tournament; Semi-finals	Greece	1–0	Belarus	Limassol, Cyprus
19:00 UTC+2	Samaras 15'	Report		Stadium: Tsirion Athletic Center; Attendance: 3,500; Referee: Salomir Mircea (Romania)

1 March 2006 Cyprus Football Tournament; Third place play-off	Finland	2–2	Belarus	Paphos, Cyprus
19:00 UTC+2	Riihilahti 82'; Forssell 90'	Report	Karnilenka 34'; Shkabara 53'	Stadium: Pafiako Stadium; Attendance: 30; Referee: Robert Krajnc (Slovenia)

30 May 2006 LG Cup semi-finals	Tunisia	3–0	Belarus	Tunis, Tunisia
20:30 UTC+02	Namouchi 34' dos Santos 46'; Jomaa 90+3'	Report		Stadium: Stade du 7 Novembre; Attendance: 24,000; Referee: Djaballah Touati (Algeria)

2 June 2006 LG Cup third place play-off	Libya	1–1 (3–1 p)	Belarus	Tunis, Tunisia
18:00 UTC+2	Osman 90'	Report	Shtanyuk 12'	Stadium: Stade du 7 Novembre; Attendance: 8,000; Referee: Aouaz Trabelsi (Algeria)

16 August International Friendly	Belarus	3–0	Andorra	Minsk, Belarus
21:00 UTC+3	A. Hleb 35'; Bulyga 76'; Karnilenka 84'	Report		Stadium: Dinamo Stadium; Attendance: 7,500; Referee: Audrius Žuta (Lithuania)

2 September UEFA Euro 2008 qualifying Group G	Belarus	2–2	Albania	Minsk, Belarus
19:00 UTC+3	Kalachev 1'; Romaschenko 24'	Report	Skela 7' (pen.); Hasi 86'	Stadium: Dinamo Stadium; Attendance: 23,000; Referee: Tony Asumaa (Finland)

6 September UEFA Euro 2008 qualifying Group G	Netherlands	3–0	Belarus	Eindhoven, Netherlands
20:30 UTC+2	Van Persie 32', 78'; Kuyt 90+2'	Report		Stadium: Philips Stadion; Attendance: 35,000; Referee: Howard Webb (England)

7 October UEFA Euro 2008 qualifying Group G	Romania	3–1	Belarus	Bucharest, Romania
20:15 UTC+3	Mutu 8'; Marica 10'; Goian 76'	Report	Kornilenko 20'	Stadium: Stadionul Steaua; Attendance: 12,500; Referee: Alberto Undiano Mallenco (Spain)

11 October UEFA Euro 2008 qualifying Group G	Belarus	4–2	Slovenia	Minsk, Belarus
18:00 UTC+3	Kovba 17'; Kornilenko 52', 60'; Korytko 85'	Report	Cesar 19'; Lavrič 43'	Stadium: Dinamo Stadium; Attendance: 21,150; Referee: Viktor Kassai (Hungary)

15 November International Friendly	Estonia	2–1	Belarus	Tallinn, Estonia
18:00 UTC+2	Oper 17', 66'	Report	V. Hleb 64' (pen.)	Stadium: A. Le Coq Arena; Attendance: 3,000; Referee: Anders Hermansen (Denmark)

=== 2007 ===
7 February International Friendly	Iran	2–2	Belarus	Tehran, Iran
17:00 UTC+03:30	Khatibi 6'; Rajabzadeh 88'	Report	V. Hleb 53', 59'	Stadium: Azadi Stadium; Attendance: 18,000; Referee: Saad Kamil Al Fadhli (Kuwait)

24 March UEFA Euro 2008 qualifying Group G	Luxembourg	1–2	Belarus	Luxembourg City, Luxembourg
17:00 UTC+1	Sagramola 68'	Report	Kalachev 24'; Kutuzov 54'	Stadium: Stade Josy Barthel; Attendance: 2,021; Referee: Mark Steven Whitby (Wales)

2 June UEFA Euro 2008 qualifying Group G	Belarus	0–2	Bulgaria	Minsk, Belarus
21:00 UTC+3		Report	Berbatov 28', 47'	Stadium: Dinamo Stadium; Attendance: 25,962; Referee: Jaroslav Jára (Czech Republic)

6 June UEFA Euro 2008 qualifying Group G	Bulgaria	2–1	Belarus	Sofia, Bulgaria
20:00 UTC+3	M. Petrov 10'; Yankov 40'	Report	Vasilyuk 4' (pen.)	Stadium: Vasil Levski National Stadium; Attendance: 10,227; Referee: Kristinn Jakobsson (Iceland)

22 August International Friendly	Belarus	2–1	Israel	Minsk, Belarus
21:00 UTC+3	Vasilyuk 3'; Ramashchanka 90+2'	Report	Gershon 29' (pen.)	Stadium: Dinamo Stadium; Attendance: 10,500; Referee: Paulius Malžinskas (Lithuania)

8 September UEFA Euro 2008 qualifying Group G	Belarus	1–3	Romania	Minsk, Belarus
19:00 UTC+3	Romaschenko 20'	Report	Mutu 16', 77' (pen.); Dică 42'	Stadium: Dinamo Stadium; Attendance: 19,320; Referee: Peter Fröjdfeldt (Sweden)

12 September UEFA Euro 2008 qualifying Group G	Slovenia	1–0	Belarus	Celje, Slovenia
19:45 UTC+2	Lavrič 3' (pen.)	Report		Stadium: Arena Petrol; Attendance: 3,500; Referee: Veaceslav Banari (Moldova)

13 October UEFA Euro 2008 qualifying Group G	Belarus	0–1	Luxembourg	Gomel, Belarus
18:00 UTC+3		Report	Leweck 90+5'	Stadium: Central Stadion; Attendance: 13,500; Referee: Michael Svendsen (Denmark)

17 October International Friendly	Israel	2–1	Belarus	Ramat Gan, Israel
20:45 UTC+03	Baruchyan 37'; Balili 71'	Report	Ramashchanka 65'	Stadium: National Stadium; Attendance: 4,362; Referee: Tsvetan Georgiev (Bulgaria)

17 November UEFA Euro 2008 qualifying Group G	Albania	2–4	Belarus	Tirana, Albania
20:00 UTC+1	Bogdani 43'; Kapllani 44'	Report	Romaschenko 32', 63' (pen.); Kutuzov 45+1', 55'	Stadium: Qemal Stafa Stadium; Attendance: 2,064; Referee: Bülent Demirlek (Turkey)

21 November UEFA Euro 2008 qualifying Group G	Belarus	2–1	Netherlands	Minsk, Belarus
19:00 UTC+2	Bulyha 49'; Korytko 65'	Report	Van der Vaart 89'	Stadium: Dinamo Stadium; Attendance: 11,900; Referee: Bertrand Layec (France)

=== 2008 ===
2 February 2008 Malta International Football Tournament	Belarus	2–0	Iceland	Ta' Qali, Malta
16:00 UTC+1	Plaskonny; Vasilyuk	Report		Stadium: Ta'Qali National Stadium; Attendance: 100; Referee: Christopher Lautier (Malta)

4 February 2008 Malta International Football Tournament	Armenia	2–1	Belarus	Ta' Qali, Malta
18:30 UTC+1	Arakelyan 19'; Hakobyan 77'	Report	V. Hleb 5'	Stadium: Ta'Qali National Stadium; Attendance: 100; Referee: Anton Zammit (Malta)

6 February 2008 Malta International Football Tournament	Malta	0–1	Belarus	Ta' Qali, Malta
19:45 UTC+1		Report	Ramashchanka 89'	Stadium: Ta'Qali National Stadium; Attendance: 1,000; Referee: Ararat Chagharyan (Armenia)

26 March International Friendly	Belarus	2–2	Turkey	Minsk, Belarus
20:00 UTC+2	Kutuzov 35'; V. Hleb 64'	Report	Şanlı 38'; Metin 71'	Stadium: Dinamo Stadium; Attendance: 12,000; Referee: Paulius Malžinskas (Lithuania)

27 May International Friendly	Germany	2–2	Belarus	Kaiserslautern, Germany
17:45 UTC+2	Klose 10'; Karytska 20' (o.g.)	Report	Bulyga 61', 88'	Stadium: Fritz Walter Stadion; Attendance: 47,258; Referee: Darko Čeferin (Slovenia)

2 June International Friendly	Finland	1–1	Belarus	Turku, Finland
19:00 UTC+3	Kallio 90+4'	Report	Shytaw 90+2'	Stadium: Veritas Stadion; Attendance: 6,474; Referee: Damir Skomina (Slovenia)

20 August International Friendly	Belarus	0–0	Argentina	Minsk, Belarus
20:00 UTC+3		Report		Stadium: Dinamo Stadium; Attendance: 25,000; Referee: Stanislav Sukhina (Russia)

6 September 2010 FIFA World Cup Qualifying Group 6	Ukraine	1–0	Belarus	Lviv, Ukraine
20:00 UTC+3	Shevchenko 90+4' (pen.)	Report		Stadium: Ukraina Stadium; Attendance: 24,000; Referee: Nicola Rizzoli (Italy)

10 September 2010 FIFA World Cup Qualifying Group 6	Andorra	1–3	Belarus	Andorra la Vella, Andorra
19:00 UTC+2	Pujol 67' (pen.)	Report	Verkhovtsov 37'; Rodionov 79'; V. Hleb 90'	Stadium: Comunal; Attendance: 600; Referee: Simon Evans (Wales)

15 October 2010 FIFA World Cup Qualifying Group 6	Belarus	1–3	England	Minsk, Belarus
21:30 UTC+3	Sitko 28'	Report	Gerrard 11'; Rooney 50', 74'	Stadium: Dinamo Stadium; Attendance: 29,600; Referee: Terje Hauge (Norway)

19 November International Friendly	Cyprus	2–1	Belarus	Nicosia, Cyprus
19:00 UTC+2	Christofi 29'; Avraam 46'	Report	Kovel 55'	Stadium: GSP Stadium; Attendance: 800; Referee: Asaf Kenan (Israel)

=== 2009 ===
1 April 2010 FIFA World Cup Qualifying Group 6	Kazakhstan	1–5	Belarus	Almaty, Kazakhstan
20:30 UTC+6	Abdulin 10'	Report	A. Hleb 48'; Kalachev 54', 64'; Stasevich 57'; Rodionov 88'	Stadium: Almaty Central Stadium; Attendance: 19,000; Referee: Jiří Jech (Czech Republic)

6 June 2010 FIFA World Cup Qualifying Group 6	Belarus	5–1	Andorra	Grodno, Belarus
19:00 UTC+3	Bliznyuk 2', 76'; Kalachev 44'; Kornilenko 50', 65'	Report	I. Lima 90+3' (pen.)	Stadium: Neman Stadium; Attendance: 8,500; Referee: Robert Kranjc (Slovenia)

10 June International Friendly	Belarus	2–2	Moldova	Barysaw, Belarus
19:00 UTC+3	Radzivonaw 4'; Bliznyuk 27'	Report	Calincov 76'; Andronic 82'	Stadium: City Stadium; Attendance: 2,000; Referee: Gediminas Mažeika (Lithuania)

12 August 2010 FIFA World Cup Qualifying Group 6	Belarus	1–3	Croatia	Minsk, Belarus
21:15 UTC+3	Verkhovtsov 81'	Report	Olić 22', 85'; Eduardo 69'	Stadium: Dinamo Stadium; Attendance: 21,651; Referee: Felix Brych (Germany)

5 September 2010 FIFA World Cup Qualifying Group 6	Croatia	1–0	Belarus	Zagreb, Croatia
20:30 UTC+2	Rakitić 24'	Report		Stadium: Maksimir Stadium; Attendance: 25,628; Referee: Konrad Plautz (Austria)

9 September 2010 FIFA World Cup Qualifying Group 6	Belarus	0–0	Ukraine	Minsk, Belarus
20:00 UTC+3		Report		Stadium: Dinamo Stadium; Attendance: 21,727; Referee: Viktor Kassai (Hungary)

10 October 2010 FIFA World Cup Qualifying Group 6	Belarus	4–0	Kazakhstan	Brest, Belarus
18:00 UTC+3	Bardachov 23'; Kalachev 69', 90+3'; Kovel 86'	Report		Stadium: Regional Sport Complex Brestskiy; Attendance: 10,000; Referee: Saïd Ennjimi (France)

14 October 2010 FIFA World Cup Qualifying Group 6	England	3–0	Belarus	London, England
20:00 UTC+1	Crouch 4', 76'; Wright-Phillips 60'	Report		Stadium: Wembley Stadium; Attendance: 76,897; Referee: Lucilio Cardoso Cortez Batista (Portugal)

14 November International Friendly	Saudi Arabia	1–1	Belarus	Khobar, Saudi Arabia
17:30 UTC+3	Al Shamrani 32'	Report	Bardachow 20'	Stadium: Prince Saud bin Jalawi Stadium; Attendance: 1,100; Referee: Salah Al Abbasi (Bahrain)

18 November International Friendly	Montenegro	1–0	Belarus	Podgorica, Montenegro
17:00 UTC+1	Vučinić 80'	Report		Stadium: Podgorica City Stadium; Attendance: 5,000; Referee: Aleksandar Stavrev (Macedonia)
