= UEFA Euro 2008 qualifying Group G =

Football tournament qualifying stage

Standings and results for Group G of the UEFA Euro 2008 qualifying tournament.

Romania secured qualification to the tournament proper on 17 October 2007 following a 2–0 win against Luxembourg, and a 1–1 draw between Albania and Bulgaria, becoming the fourth team in the whole of the qualification stage to do so. The Netherlands secured qualification to the tournament proper on 17 November 2007 following a 1–0 win against Luxembourg, becoming the ninth team in the whole of the qualification stage to do so.

== Standings ==
Pos	Team	Pld	W	D	L	GF	GA	GD	Pts	Qualification	(Romania)	(Netherlands)	(Bulgaria)	(Belarus)	(Albania)	(Slovenia)	(Luxembourg)
1	Romania	12	9	2	1	26	7	+19	29	Qualify for final tournament	—	1–0	2–2	3–1	6–1	2–0	3–0
2	Netherlands	12	8	2	2	15	5	+10	26	Qualify for final tournament	0–0	—	2–0	3–0	2–1	2–0	1–0
3	Bulgaria	12	7	4	1	18	7	+11	25		1–0	1–1	—	2–1	0–0	3–0	3–0
4	Belarus	12	4	1	7	17	23	−6	13		1–3	2–1	0–2	—	2–2	4–2	0–1
5	Albania	12	2	5	5	12	18	−6	11 (Note: Tied on head-to-head results. Overall goal difference was used as the tiebreaker.)		0–2	0–1	1–1	2–4	—	0–0	2–0
6	Slovenia	12	3	2	7	9	16	−7	11		1–2	0–1	0–2	1–0	0–0	—	2–0
7	Luxembourg	12	1	0	11	2	23	−21	3		0–2	0–1	0–1	1–2	0–3	0–3	—

Source: UEFA
Rules for classification: Qualification tiebreakers

== Matches ==
Group G fixtures were negotiated at a meeting between the participants in Amsterdam, Netherlands on 16 February 2006.

2 September 2006
19:00 UTC+3

Belarus	2–2	Albania
Kalachev 2'; Romaschenko 24'	Report	Skela 7' (pen.); Hasi 86'

Dinamo Stadium, Minsk
Attendance: 23,000
Referee: Tony Asumaa (Finland)
2 September 2006
21:00 UTC+3

Romania	2–2	Bulgaria
Roşu 40'; Marica 54'	Report	M. Petrov 82', 84'

Gheorghe Hagi Stadium, Constanţa
Attendance: 12,620
Referee: Stefano Farina (Italy)
2 September 2006
20:30 UTC+2

Luxembourg	0–1	Netherlands
	Report	Mathijsen 26'

Stade Josy Barthel, Luxembourg City
Attendance: 8,055
Referee: João Ferreira (Portugal)

6 September 2006
20:00 UTC+3

Bulgaria	3–0	Slovenia
Bojinov 58'; M. Petrov 70'; Telkiyski 79'	Report

Vasil Levski National Stadium, Sofia
Attendance: 16,543
Referee: Claus Bo Larsen (Denmark)
6 September 2006
20:00 UTC+2

Albania	0–2	Romania
	Report	Dică 65'; Mutu 75' (pen.)

Qemal Stafa, Tirana
Attendance: 12,000
Referee: Olegário Benquerença (Portugal)
6 September 2006
20:30 UTC+2

Netherlands	3–0	Belarus
Van Persie 33', 78'; Kuyt 90+2'	Report

Philips Stadion, Eindhoven
Attendance: 30,089
Referee: Howard Webb (England)

7 October 2006
20:15 UTC+3

Romania	3–1	Belarus
Mutu 7'; Marica 10'; Goian 76'	Report	Kornilenko 20'

Ghencea Stadium, Bucharest
Attendance: 12,000
Referee: Alberto Undiano Mallenco (Spain)
7 October 2006
21:00 UTC+3

Bulgaria	1–1	Netherlands
M. Petrov 12'	Report	Van Persie 62'

Vasil Levski National Stadium, Sofia
Attendance: 30,547
Referee: Tom Henning Øvrebø (Norway)
7 October 2006
20:45 UTC+2

Slovenia	2–0	Luxembourg
Novaković 30'; Koren 44'	Report

Arena Petrol, Celje
Attendance: 3,800
Referee: Panicos Kailis (Cyprus)

11 October 2006
18:00 UTC+3

Belarus	4–2	Slovenia
Kovba 18'; Kornilenko 52', 60'; Korytko 85'	Report	Cesar 19'; Lavrič 43'

Dinamo Stadium, Minsk
Attendance: 21,150
Referee: Viktor Kassai (Hungary)
11 October 2006
20:15 UTC+2

Luxembourg	0–1	Bulgaria
	Report	Tunchev 26'

Stade Josy Barthel, Luxembourg City
Attendance: 3,156
Referee: Novo Panić (Bosnia and Herzegovina)
11 October 2006
20:30 UTC+2

Netherlands	2–1	Albania
Van Persie 15'; Beqaj 42' (o.g.)	Report	Curri 67'

Amsterdam ArenA, Amsterdam
Attendance: 40,085
Referee: Alon Yefet (Israel)

24 March 2007
17:00 UTC+1

Luxembourg	1–2	Belarus
Sagramola 68'	Report	Kalachev 25'; Kutuzov 54'

Stade Josy Barthel, Luxembourg City
Attendance: 2,021
Referee: Mark Steven Whitby (Wales)
24 March 2007
17:00 UTC+1

Albania	0–0	Slovenia
	Report

Loro-Boriçi Stadium, Shkodër
Attendance: 7,000
Referee: Joseph Attard (Malta)
24 March 2007
20:30 UTC+1

Netherlands	0–0	Romania
	Report

Feijenoord Stadion, Rotterdam
Attendance: 48,000
Referee: Marcus Merk (Germany)

28 March 2007
18:00 UTC+3

Bulgaria	0–0	Albania
	Report

Vasil Levski National Stadium, Sofia
Attendance: 24,893
Referee: Jonas Eriksson (Sweden)
28 March 2007
18:30 UTC+3

Romania	3–0	Luxembourg
Mutu 26'; Contra 56'; Marica 90'	Report

Ceahlăul Stadium, Piatra Neamț
Attendance: 9,120
Referee: Romans Lajuks (Latvia)
28 March 2007
20:45 UTC+2

Slovenia	0–1	Netherlands
	Report	Van Bronckhorst 86'

Arena Petrol, Celje
Attendance: 9,520
Referee: Manuel Mejuto González (Spain)

2 June 2007
20:30 UTC+2

Albania	2–0	Luxembourg
Kapllani 38'; Haxhi 57'	Report

Qemal Stafa, Tirana
Attendance: 3,000
Referee: Lasha Silagava (Georgia)
2 June 2007
20:45 UTC+2

Slovenia	1–2	Romania
Vršič 90+4'	Report	Tamaş 52'; Nicoliţă 69'

Arena Petrol, Celje
Attendance: 6,500
Referee: Stuart Dougal (Scotland)
2 June 2007
21:00 UTC+3

Belarus	0–2	Bulgaria
	Report	Berbatov 28', 46'

Dinamo Stadium, Minsk
Attendance: 25,962
Referee: Jaroslav Jára (Czech Republic)

6 June 2007
20:00 UTC+3

Bulgaria	2–1	Belarus
M. Petrov 10'; Yankov 40'	Report	Vasilyuk 5' (pen.)

Vasil Levski National Stadium, Sofia
Attendance: 10,227
Referee: Kristinn Jakobsson (Iceland)
6 June 2007
20:15 UTC+2

Luxembourg	0–3	Albania
	Report	Skela 25'; Kapllani 36', 72'

Stade Josy Barthel, Luxembourg City
Attendance: 4,325
Referee: Paulius Malzinskas (Lithuania)
6 June 2007
21:00 UTC+3

Romania	2–0	Slovenia
Mutu 40'; Contra 70'	Report

Dan Păltinişanu, Timișoara
Attendance: 17,850
Referee: Alon Yefet (Israel)

8 September 2007
17:00 UTC+2

Luxembourg	0–3	Slovenia
	Report	Lavrič 7', 47'; Novaković 37'

Stade Josy Barthel, Luxembourg City
Attendance: 2,012
Referee: Sergiy Berezka (Ukraine)
8 September 2007
19:00 UTC+3

Belarus	1–3	Romania
Romaschenko 20'	Report	Mutu 16', 77' (pen.); Dică 42'

Dinamo Stadium, Minsk
Attendance: 19,320
Referee: Peter Fröjdfeldt (Sweden)
8 September 2007
20:30 UTC+2

Netherlands	2–0	Bulgaria
Sneijder 23'; Van Nistelrooy 58'	Report

Amsterdam ArenA, Amsterdam
Attendance: 49,500
Referee: Luis Medina Cantalejo (Spain)

12 September 2007
20:30 UTC+3

Bulgaria	3–0	Luxembourg
Berbatov 27', 28'; M. Petrov 54' (pen.)	Report

Vasil Levski National Stadium, Sofia
Attendance: 4,674
Referee: Bülent Demirlek (Turkey)
12 September 2007
19:45 UTC+2

Slovenia	1–0	Belarus
Lavrič 3' (pen.)	Report

Arena Petrol, Celje
Attendance: 3,500
Referee: Veaceslav Banari (Moldova)
12 September 2007
20:45 UTC+2

Albania	0–1	Netherlands
	Report	Van Nistelrooy 90+1'

Qemal Stafa, Tirana
Attendance: 15,000
Referee: Mike Riley (England)

13 October 2007
18:00 UTC+3

Belarus	0–1	Luxembourg
	Report	Leweck 90+5'

Central Stadion, Gomel
Attendance: 13,500
Referee: Michael Svendsen (Denmark)
13 October 2007
20:15 UTC+3

Romania	1–0	Netherlands
Goian 71'	Report

Gheorghe Hagi Stadium, Constanţa
Attendance: 12,595
Referee: Kyros Vassaras (Greece)
13 October 2007
20:30 UTC+2

Slovenia	0–0	Albania
	Report

Arena Petrol, Celje
Attendance: 4,625
Referee: Duarte Nuno Pereira Gomes (Portugal)

17 October 2007
20:15 UTC+2

Luxembourg	0–2	Romania
	Report	F. Petre 42'; Marica 61'

Stade Josy Barthel, Luxembourg City
Attendance: 3,584
Referee: Felix Brych (Germany)
17 October 2007
20:30 UTC+2

Netherlands	2–0	Slovenia
Sneijder 14'; Huntelaar 88'	Report

Philips Stadion, Eindhoven
Attendance: 32,500
Referee: Nicola Rizzoli (Italy)
17 October 2007
20:45 UTC+2

Albania	1–1	Bulgaria
Kishishev 32' (o.g.)	Report	Berbatov 87'

Qemal Stafa, Tirana
Attendance: 3,000
Referee: Fritz Stuchlik (Austria)

17 November 2007
18:00 UTC+2

Bulgaria	1–0	Romania
Dimitrov 6'	Report

Vasil Levski National Stadium, Sofia
Attendance: 6,000
Referee: Konrad Plautz (Austria)
17 November 2007
20:00 UTC+2

Albania	2–4	Belarus
Bogdani 39'; Kapllani 43'	Report	Romaschenko 28', 63' (pen.); Kutuzov 45+1', 54'

Qemal Stafa, Tirana
Attendance: 2,064
Referee: Bülent Demirlek (Turkey)
17 November 2007
20:30 UTC+1

Netherlands	1–0	Luxembourg
Koevermans 43'	Report

Feijenoord Stadion, Rotterdam
Attendance: 45,000
Referee: Martin Hansson (Sweden)

21 November 2007
18:00 UTC+2

Romania	6–1	Albania
Dică 22', 71' (pen.); Tamaş 53'; Niculae 62', 65'; Marica 69' (pen.)	Report	Kapllani 64'

Lia Manoliu Stadium, Bucharest
Attendance: 23,427
Referee: Edo Trivkovic (Croatia)
21 November 2007
19:00 UTC+2

Belarus	2–1	Netherlands
Bulyha 49'; Korytko 65'	Report	Van der Vaart 88'

Dinamo Stadium, Minsk
Attendance: 11,900
Referee: Bertrand Layec (France)
21 November 2007
18:00 UTC+1

Slovenia	0–2	Bulgaria
	Report	Georgiev 81'; Berbatov 84'

Arena Petrol, Celje
Attendance: 3,700
Referee: Howard Webb (England)

== Goalscorers ==
There were 99 goals scored in 42 matches, for an average of 2.36 goals per match.

6 goals

- (Bulgaria) Dimitar Berbatov
- (Bulgaria) Martin Petrov
- (Romania) Adrian Mutu

5 goals

- (Albania) Edmond Kapllani
- (Romania) Ciprian Marica

4 goals

- (Belarus) Maksim Romaschenko
- (Netherlands) Robin van Persie
- (Romania) Nicolae Dică
- (Slovenia) Klemen Lavrič

3 goals

- (Belarus) Sergei Kornilenko
- (Belarus) Vitali Kutuzov

2 goals

- (Albania) Ervin Skela
- (Belarus) Timofei Kalachev
- (Belarus) Uladzimir Karytska
- (Netherlands) Wesley Sneijder
- (Netherlands) Ruud van Nistelrooy
- (Romania) Cosmin Contra
- (Romania) Dorin Goian
- (Romania) Daniel Niculae
- (Romania) Gabriel Tamaș
- (Slovenia) Milivoje Novaković

1 goal

- (Albania) Erjon Bogdani
- (Albania) Debatik Curri
- (Albania) Besnik Hasi
- (Albania) Altin Haxhi
- (Belarus) Vital Bulyga
- (Belarus) Dzyanis Kowba
- (Belarus) Raman Vasilyuk
- (Bulgaria) Valeri Bojinov
- (Bulgaria) Velizar Dimitrov
- (Bulgaria) Blagoy Georgiev
- (Bulgaria) Dimitar Telkiyski
- (Bulgaria) Aleksandar Tunchev
- (Bulgaria) Chavdar Yankov
- (Luxembourg) Alphonse Leweck
- (Luxembourg) Chris Sagramola
- (Netherlands) Klaas-Jan Huntelaar
- (Netherlands) Danny Koevermans
- (Netherlands) Dirk Kuyt
- (Netherlands) Joris Mathijsen
- (Netherlands) Giovanni van Bronckhorst
- (Netherlands) Rafael van der Vaart
- (Romania) Bănel Nicoliță
- (Romania) Florentin Petre
- (Romania) Laurențiu Roșu
- (Slovenia) Boštjan Cesar
- (Slovenia) Robert Koren
- (Slovenia) Dare Vršič

1 own goal

- (Albania) Arjan Beqaj (against Netherlands)
- (Bulgaria) Radostin Kishishev (against Albania)
