= 2006–07 2. Bundesliga =

33rd season of the second-tier football league in Germany

2. Bundesliga
- Season: 2006–07
- Champions: Karlsruher SC
- Promoted: Karlsruher SC; FC Hansa Rostock; MSV Duisburg
- Relegated: Rot-Weiss Essen; SpVgg Unterhaching; Wacker Burghausen; Eintracht Braunschweig
- Matches: 306
- Goals: 804 (2.63 per match)
- Top goalscorer: Giovanni Federico (19)
- Biggest home win: Essen 5–0 Köln
- Biggest away win: Freiburg 0–4 KSC; Burghausen 0–4 KSC
- Highest scoring: Freiburg 5–4 Aue

The 2006–07 2. Bundesliga was the 33rd season of the 2. Bundesliga, the second tier of Germany football league.

Karlsruher SC, FC Hansa Rostock and MSV Duisburg were promoted to the Bundesliga. Rot-Weiss Essen, SpVgg Unterhaching, SV Wacker Burghausen and Eintracht Braunschweig were relegated to the Regionalliga.

== League table ==
For the 2006–07 season FC Augsburg, TuS Koblenz, FC Carl Zeiss Jena and Rot-Weiss Essen were newly promoted to the 2. Bundesliga from the Regionalliga while 1. FC Kaiserslautern, 1. FC Köln and MSV Duisburg had been relegated to the league from the Bundesliga.

Locations of the participating teams of the 2006–07 season

Pos	Team	Pld	W	D	L	GF	GA	GD	Pts	Promotion or relegation
1	Karlsruher SC (C, P)	34	21	7	6	69	41	+28	70	Promotion to Bundesliga
2	Hansa Rostock (P)	34	16	14	4	49	30	+19	62	Promotion to Bundesliga
3	MSV Duisburg (P)	34	16	12	6	66	40	+26	60	Promotion to Bundesliga
4	SC Freiburg	34	17	9	8	55	39	+16	60	
5	SpVgg Greuther Fürth	34	16	6	12	53	40	+13	54	
6	1. FC Kaiserslautern	34	13	14	7	48	34	+14	53	
7	FC Augsburg	34	14	10	10	43	32	+11	52	
8	1860 Munich	34	14	6	14	47	49	−2	48	
9	1. FC Köln	34	12	10	12	49	50	−1	46	
10	Erzgebirge Aue	34	13	6	15	46	48	−2	45	
11	SC Paderborn	34	11	9	14	32	41	−9	42	
12	TuS Koblenz	34	11	8	15	36	45	−9	41	
13	Carl Zeiss Jena	34	9	11	14	40	56	−16	38	
14	Kickers Offenbach	34	9	9	16	42	59	−17	36	
15	Rot-Weiss Essen (R)	34	8	11	15	34	40	−6	35	Relegation to Regionalliga (Note: Rot-Weiss Essen and Eintracht Braunschweig were relegated to Regionalliga Nord. SpVgg Unterhaching and Wacker Burghausen were relegated to Regionalliga Süd.)
16	SpVgg Unterhaching (R)	34	9	8	17	33	49	−16	35	Relegation to Regionalliga
17	Wacker Burghausen (R)	34	7	11	16	42	63	−21	32	Relegation to Regionalliga
18	Eintracht Braunschweig (R)	34	4	11	19	20	48	−28	23	Relegation to Regionalliga

Source: Bundesliga.de
Rules for classification: 1) points; 2) goal difference; 3) number of goals scored.
(C) Champions; (P) Promoted; (R) Relegated

== Results ==
Home \ Away	AUE	FCA	EBS	WBU	DUI	RWE	SCF	SGF	JEN	FCK	KSC	KOB	KOE	M60	KOF	SCP	ROS	UNT
Erzgebirge Aue	—	1–1	3–0	3–0	0–1	0–0	3–1	0–3	5–1	1–0	2–2	4–1	0–1	2–2	2–1	1–0	3–0	1–0
FC Augsburg	3–0	—	0–0	1–0	1–2	0–0	2–0	1–0	1–2	3–2	3–1	2–0	0–2	3–0	1–1	0–1	1–1	2–1
Eintracht Braunschweig	1–0	0–1	—	3–1	1–1	0–1	0–2	0–2	1–0	0–1	2–2	0–2	0–1	2–0	1–2	0–0	1–1	2–3
Wacker Burghausen	1–1	0–2	1–1	—	1–1	1–1	2–2	3–4	1–1	0–0	0–4	0–0	1–3	0–2	4–1	5–1	0–1	4–1
MSV Duisburg	4–2	3–0	0–0	3–4	—	3–0	1–1	0–2	4–0	1–1	2–1	2–1	1–3	0–0	4–0	1–1	1–2	4–2
Rot-Weiss Essen	0–1	0–0	2–0	1–1	1–2	—	2–0	1–0	4–4	0–0	1–2	0–1	5–0	0–2	2–2	2–2	0–0	1–1
SC Freiburg	5–4	2–0	1–0	2–0	2–1	3–1	—	3–3	1–3	4–1	0–4	2–0	0–0	3–0	1–3	0–1	0–0	1–1
Greuther Fürth	2–1	2–1	3–0	4–1	3–5	0–2	0–0	—	2–0	2–2	1–3	2–0	1–2	1–1	2–0	3–0	1–3	1–0
Carl Zeiss Jena	2–1	0–2	0–0	0–2	3–3	2–0	2–1	1–1	—	1–1	1–3	2–0	3–2	3–1	2–3	1–1	1–2	0–2
1. FC Kaiserslautern	4–0	0–0	1–1	4–0	0–3	1–0	1–3	3–0	0–0	—	1–1	4–3	2–2	2–1	4–0	2–0	1–1	4–0
Karlsruher SC	0–1	3–2	2–0	2–1	3–3	1–3	0–3	2–0	4–1	2–0	—	3–1	2–1	4–1	2–1	3–0	4–4	1–0
TuS Koblenz	2–1	1–1	1–0	1–2	1–1	0–1	0–1	1–0	0–0	0–0	1–1	—	3–1	2–1	1–1	3–1	0–3	0–0
1. FC Köln	0–1	1–1	4–1	5–1	1–3	1–0	0–3	0–2	1–0	2–2	1–1	3–1	—	1–2	2–2	1–1	2–2	4–1
1860 Munich	4–0	0–3	2–0	5–1	2–2	2–0	1–1	0–3	2–0	0–1	2–0	2–1	3–1	—	3–0	1–0	1–2	1–0
Kickers Offenbach	3–1	3–2	1–1	2–1	0–0	1–0	2–3	1–2	2–2	0–1	0–1	2–3	2–0	2–1	—	0–2	1–1	1–1
SC Paderborn	1–0	1–0	0–0	1–1	0–3	3–2	1–1	0–0	0–1	0–1	1–2	1–2	2–0	3–0	2–1	—	0–2	2–0
Hansa Rostock	1–0	2–2	4–0	0–0	1–0	2–0	0–1	1–0	1–1	2–0	1–2	0–3	1–1	1–1	2–1	2–0	—	3–1
SpVgg Unterhaching	1–1	0–1	3–2	0–2	0–1	2–1	0–2	2–1	2–0	1–1	0–1	1–0	0–0	5–1	2–0	0–3	0–0	—

Source: DFB
Legend: Blue = home team win; Yellow = draw; Red = away team win.

== Top scorers ==
Goals	Player	Team
19	(Italy) Giovanni Federico	Karlsruher SC
17	(Albania) Edmond Kapllani	Karlsruher SC
15	(Belgium) Axel Lawarée	FC Augsburg
14	(Germany) Patrick Helmes	1. FC Köln
14	(Turkey) Suat Türker	Kickers Offenbach
12	(Morocco) Youssef Mokhtari	MSV Duisburg
12	(Slovenia) Klemen Lavrič	MSV Duisburg
12	(Germany) Enrico Kern	FC Hansa Rostock
12	(Germany) Christian Timm	SpVgg Greuther Fürth
10	(Georgia (country)) Alexander Iashvili	SC Freiburg
10	(Montenegro) Dragan Bogavac	SV Wacker Burghausen
10	(Lebanon) Roda Antar	SC Freiburg
10	(Slovenia) Milivoje Novakovič	1. FC Köln
10	(Turkey) Berkant Göktan	TSV 1860 Munich

== Attendances ==
No.	Team	Attendance	Change	Highest
1	1. FC Köln	42,194	-13.8%	49,500
2	TSV 1860	35,965	-14.2%	69,000
3	1. FC Kaiserslautern	31,717	-4.0%	48,500
4	Karlsruher SC	24,746	44.7%	32,306
5	Hansa Rostock	19,429	30.8%	29,000
6	MSV Duisburg	18,028	-28.4%	31,500
7	FC Augsburg	16,812	268.7%	28,000
8	SC Freiburg	16,265	16.0%	24,500
9	BTSV Eintracht	15,671	-13.7%	21,500
10	RW Essen	13,624	10.9%	17,052
11	FC Erzgebirge Aue	11,626	0.8%	16,500
12	OFC Kickers	10,745	4.6%	18,100
13	TuS Koblenz	10,480	124.9%	15,000
14	FC Carl Zeiss Jena	8,699	51.4%	12,500
15	Greuther Fürth	7,909	11.4%	14,000
16	SC Paderborn 07	6,090	-7.2%	10,165
17	Wacker Burghausen	5,845	25.5%	11,000
18	SpVgg Unterhaching	4,865	6.2%	14,000
