= 2008 Malta International Football Tournament =

International football competition

Tournament details
- Host country: Malta
- Dates: 2–6 February
- Teams: 4
- Venue(s): 1 (in 1 host city)

Final positions
- Champions: Belarus (2nd title)
- Runners-up: Armenia
- Third place: Iceland
- Fourth place: Malta

Tournament statistics
- Matches played: 6
- Goals scored: 10 (1.67 per match)
- Top scorer(s): (Armenia) Ara Hakobyan (2 goals)

The 2008 Malta International Football Tournament was the fourteenth and last edition of the Malta International Tournament, a biannual football competition organised by the Malta Football Association for a select men's national football team. It was held in Malta, from 2 February to 6 February 2008, with games played at the National Stadium in Ta' Qali.

Besides Malta's national team, Armenia, Belarus and Iceland contested this edition.

== Matches ==
| Pos | Team | Pld | W | D | L | GF | GA | GD | Pts |
|---|---|---|---|---|---|---|---|---|---|
| 1 | Belarus (C) | 3 | 2 | 0 | 1 | 4 | 2 | +2 | 6 |
| 2 | Armenia | 3 | 2 | 0 | 1 | 3 | 3 | 0 | 6 |
| 3 | Iceland | 3 | 1 | 0 | 2 | 2 | 3 | −1 | 3 |
| 4 | Malta (H) | 3 | 1 | 0 | 2 | 1 | 2 | −1 | 3 |

Source: RSSSF
(C) Champions; (H) Hosts
2 February 2008
14:00 UTC+1

| Belarus | 2–0 | Iceland |
|---|---|---|
| Vasilyuk 33'; Plaskonny 47' | Report |

National Stadium, Ta' Qali
Referee: Christopher Lautier (Malta)

2 February 2008
16:15 UTC+1

| Malta | 0–1 | Armenia |
|---|---|---|
| | Report | Hakobyan 69' |

National Stadium, Ta' Qali
Referee: Magnús Þórisson (Iceland)

4 February 2008
16:30 UTC+1

| Armenia | 2–1 | Belarus |
|---|---|---|
| Arakelyan 18'; Hakobyan 76' | Report | Hleb 5' |

National Stadium, Ta' Qali
Referee: Anton Zammit (Malta)

4 February 2008
18:45 UTC+1

| Malta | 1–0 | Iceland |
|---|---|---|
| Frendo 18' | Report |

National Stadium, Ta' Qali
Referee: Aleksei Kulbakov (Belarus)

6 February 2008
16:30 UTC+1

| Iceland | 2–0 | Armenia |
|---|---|---|
| Guðmundsson 45'; Thorvaldsson 72' | Report |

National Stadium, Ta' Qali
Referee: Joseph Attard (Malta)

6 February 2008
18:45 UTC+1

| Malta | 0–1 | Belarus |
|---|---|---|
| | Report | Romaschenko 89' |

National Stadium, Ta' Qali
Referee: Ararat Chagharyan (Armenia)

== Winner ==
2008 Malta Tournament winner

Belarus
Second title

== Statistics ==
=== Goalscorers ===
There were 10 goals scored in 6 matches, for an average of 1.67 goals per match.

2 goals

- (Armenia) Ara Hakobyan

1 goal

- (Armenia) Ararat Arakelyan
- (Belarus) Maksim Romaschenko
- (Belarus) Pavel Plaskonny
- (Belarus) Raman Vasilyuk
- (Belarus) Vyacheslav Hleb
- (Iceland) Gunnar Heidar Thorvaldsson
- (Iceland) Tryggvi Guðmundsson
- (Malta) Cleavon Frendo

Source: EU-Football

== See also ==
- China Cup
- Cyprus International Football Tournament
