= Edmond Kapllani =

Albanian footballer (born 1982)

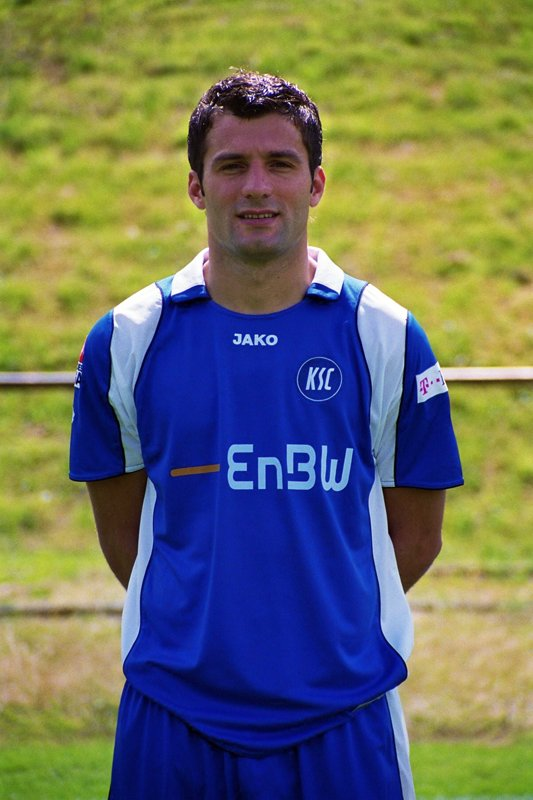
- Kapllani with Karlsruhe in 2007

Personal information
- Date of birth: 31 July 1982 (age 44)
- Place of birth: Durrës, Albania
- Height: 1.84 m (6 ft 0 in)
- Position: Forward

Team information
- Current team: SC Freiburg Women (manager)

Youth career
- 1990–1998: Teuta Durrës

Senior career*
Years	Team	Apps	(Gls)
1998–1999	Teuta Durrës	0	(0)
1999–2001	Partizani Tirana	15	(1)
2001–2002	Orijent	7	(3)
2002–2003	Partizani Tirana	18	(5)
2003–2004	Besa Kavajë	35	(12)
2004–2009	Karlsruher SC	118	(26)
2009–2012	FC Augsburg	8	(1)
2010	→ TuS Koblenz (loan)	17	(5)
2010–2011	→ SC Paderborn (loan)	23	(8)
2012–2016	FSV Frankfurt	101	(36)
2016–2018	SV Elversberg	34	(15)
2018–2020	SV Spielberg	38	(16)
Total		414	(128)

International career
2000–2001	Albania U18	2	(0)
2004–2014	Albania	41	(6)

Managerial career
- 2025–2026: SC Freiburg Women
- * Club domestic league appearances and goals

Edmond Kapllani (born 31 July 1982) is an Albanian former professional footballer who played as a forward.

== Club career ==
Born in Durrës, Albania, Kapllani began his career with KS Teuta Durrës, KF Partizani Tirana and KS Besa Kavajë in the Albanian Superliga. He also spent one year in Croatia with NK Orijent, but after an uneventful season he soon returned to play in Albania.

=== Karlsruher SC ===
On 1 July 2004, Kapllani joined the then 2. Bundesliga side, Karlsruher SC. It took time for Kapllani to adjust to the German league's style of play and started only 15 games in his first season, scoring just 1 goal. In the 2005–06 season Kapllani became a more regular first team player, appearing in 25 league games that season, scoring six goals. He had a very successful 2006–07 season with Karlsruher SC, as he became the second highest goalscorer in the 2. Bundesliga with 17 goals in 30 appearances, behind teammate and strike partner Giovanni Federico, who netted 19 times in the same season. Both players helped the club gain promotion to the Bundesliga after a nine-year absence. In the 2007–08 season, Kapllani found it difficult to adjust to the top division, starting only 14 of his 28 matches and scoring just two goals. Despite Kapllani's unsteady form, Karlsruher SC finished in eleventh place, securing top-flight football for another year.

In the following season, Kapllani started only 6 of his 20 appearances as coach Edmund Becker placed his confidence in Joshua Kennedy even though the Australian failed to score a single goal until the final match day. As a result, only one team scored less goals than Karlsruhe and the club was relegated from the Bundesliga. Kapllani's only goal of the season came from a header in the first round of the DFB-Pokal.

=== FC Augsburg ===
On 27 May 2009, Kapllani took advantage of a contract clause and left Karlsruhe for FC Augsburg on a free transfer, signing a contract until 2011.

=== TuS Koblenz ===
On 7 January 2010, FC Augsburg loaned Kapllani to TuS Koblenz until the end of the season. Altogether Kapllani scored 5 goals in 17 appearances and was the club's top scorer in the second half of the season.

=== SC Paderborn ===
Following his return to Augsburg, Kapllani scored in the first round of the DFB-Pokal. On 31 August 2010, he joined SC Paderborn 07 on loan until the end of the season. He was the club's top scorer in the 2010–11 campaign, scoring 8 goals in 23 games despite suffering a cruciate ligament rupture in February 2011. In the meantime, Augsburg gained promotion to the Bundesliga for the first time in the club's history. As a result, Kapllani's contract was extended automatically and he returned to top-flight football for the first time since 2009.

=== FSV Frankfurt ===
On 1 July 2012, after his contract had ended, he left FC Augsburg and signed a two-year contract with FSV Frankfurt until 30 June 2014.

On 21 September 2012, Kapllani scored the decisive goal in a 2–1 home win over FC St. Pauli, heading in from a corner in the 62nd minute to restore FSV Frankfurt's lead and seal what was noted as the club's 100th home victory in the 2. Bundesliga.

He started the 2014–15 season by scoring twice in a 3–2 loss against his former side Karlsruher SC. Eight days later, he scored two more in the first round of DFB-Pokal against Sportfreunde Siegen, where his team won 5–4 on penalties with Kapllani also converting his penalty shootout attempt. On 17 May 2015, Kapllani scored FSV Frankfurt's sole goal via header in a 3–1 home defeat to 1. FC Union Berlin.

On 15 May 2016, Kapllani scored two goals with penalty kick against 1860 Munich in a 2–1 home win on the last day of the 2. Bundesliga season. However, Frankfurt was relegated to 3. Liga after finishing the season in penultimate spot with only 32 points.

On 30 June 2016, Kapllani officially left the club after four seasons, due to lack of fairness from the club directors. During his spell with the club, Kapllani scored 36 league goals in 101 appearances, also four goals in seven cup matches.

=== SV Elversberg ===
On 12 July 2016, Kapllani joined SV Elversberg of Regionalliga on a free transfer. He signed a contract until June 2018. Upon signing, Roland Seitz, one of the club directors, stated: "We are pleased that he has joined SV Elversberg. Edmond is valuable not only for his football skills, but for more. He brings to the team his strength, character and leadership skills. He'll be an added value for the team of coach Michael Wiesinger."

== International career ==
Kapllani made his debut for Albania in a March 2004 friendly match against Iceland in Tirana and earned a total of 41 caps, scoring 6 goals. His final international was a June 2014 friendly away against San Marino.

Kapllani was the nation's top scorer in the Euro 2008 qualifying, scoring three goals in his country's two matches against Luxembourg and another two goals in games against Belarus and Romania. He holds the record for most goals scored in a qualifying campaign for Albania.

== Coaching career ==
For the 2025–26 season he became head coach of the SC Freiburg women's team.

== Personal life ==
Kapllani is the younger brother of the retired football goalkeeper Xhevair Kapllani, a former player of hometown club Teuta Durrës. He is married and has two children, a daughter born in 2009 and a son born in 2012.

== Career statistics ==
=== Club ===
Appearances and goals by club, season and competition
Club	Season	League			Cup		Continental		Total	
Club	Season	Division	Apps	Goals	Apps	Goals	Apps	Goals	Apps	Goals
Teuta Durrës	1998–99	Albanian Superliga	0	0	—		—		0	0
Partizani Tirana	1999–2000	Albanian Superliga	15	1	0	0	—		15	1
Partizani Tirana	2000–01	Albanian First Division	0	0	0	0	—		0	0
Partizani Tirana	Total		15	1	0	0	—		15	1
HNK Orijent 1919	2001–02	2.HNL	7	3	0	0	—		7	3
Partizani Tirana	2002–03	Albanian Superliga	18	5	0	0	1 (Note: Appearance in UEFA Cup)	0	19	5
Besa Kavajë	2003–04	Albanian Superliga	35	12	0	0	—		35	12
Karlsruher SC	2004–05	2. Bundesliga	15	1	2	0	—		17	1
Karlsruher SC	2005–06	2. Bundesliga	25	6	2	1	—		27	7
Karlsruher SC	2006–07	2. Bundesliga	30	17	1	1	—		31	18
Karlsruher SC	2007–08	Bundesliga	28	2	2	0	—		30	2
Karlsruher SC	2008–09	Bundesliga	20	0	1	1	—		21	1
Karlsruher SC	Total		118	26	8	3	—		126	29
FC Augsburg	2009–10	2. Bundesliga	2	0	1	0	—		3	0
FC Augsburg	2010–11	2. Bundesliga	0	0	1	1	—		1	1
FC Augsburg	2011–12	Bundesliga	6	1	2	0	—		8	1
FC Augsburg	Total		8	1	4	1	—		12	2
TuS Koblenz (loan)	2009–10	2. Bundesliga	17	5	0	0	—		17	5
SC Paderborn (loan)	2010–11	2. Bundesliga	23	8	0	0	—		23	8
FSV Frankfurt	2012–13	2. Bundesliga	26	11	1	0	—		27	11
FSV Frankfurt	2013–14	2. Bundesliga	30	11	2	1	—		32	12
FSV Frankfurt	2014–15	2. Bundesliga	26	11	2	2	—		28	13
FSV Frankfurt	2015–16	2. Bundesliga	19	3	2	1	—		21	4
FSV Frankfurt	Total		101	36	7	4	—		108	40
SV Elversberg	2016–17	Regionalliga Südwest	30	15	0	0	—		30	15
SV Elversberg	2017–18	Regionalliga Südwest	4	0	0	0	—		4	0
SV Elversberg	Total		34	15	0	0	—		34	15
SV Spielberg	2018–19	Oberliga Baden-Württemberg	26	10	0	0	—		26	10
SV Spielberg	2019–20	Oberliga Baden-Württemberg	12	6	0	0	—		12	6
SV Spielberg	Total		38	16	0	0	—		38	16
Career total			414	128	19	8	1	0	434	136

=== International ===
Appearances and goals by national team and year
National team	Year	Apps	Goals
Albania	2004	3	0
Albania	2005	5	0
Albania	2006	3	0
Albania	2007	9	5
Albania	2008	3	1
Albania	2009	3	0
Albania	2010	5	0
Albania	2011	5	0
Albania	2012	0	0
Albania	2013	1	0
Albania	2014	4	0
Total		41	6

Scores and results list Albania's goal tally first, score column indicates score after each Kapllani goal.

List of international goals scored by Edmond Kapllani
No.	Date	Venue	Opponent	Score	Result	Competition	Ref.
1	2 June 2007	Qemal Stafa Stadium, Tirana, Albania	Luxembourg	1–0	2–0	UEFA Euro 2008 qualifying	
2	6 June 2007	Stade Josy Barthel, Route d'Arlon, Luxembourg	Luxembourg	2–0	3–0	UEFA Euro 2008 qualifying	
3	6 June 2007	Stade Josy Barthel, Route d'Arlon, Luxembourg	Luxembourg	3–0	3–0	UEFA Euro 2008 qualifying	
4	17 November 2007	Qemal Stafa Stadium, Tirana, Albania	Belarus	2–1	2–4	UEFA Euro 2008 qualifying	
5	21 November 2007	Stadionul Național, Bucharest, Romania	Romania	1–3	1–6	UEFA Euro 2008 qualifying	
6	20 October 2008	Qemal Stafa Stadium, Tirana, Albania	Liechtenstein	2–0	2–0	Friendly	

== Honours ==
Partizani Tirana

- Albanian First Division: 2000–01

Karlsruher SC

- 2. Bundesliga: 2006–07

Individual

- Albania's top goalscorer in the UEFA Euro 2008 qualifying: 5 goals
