= Klemen Lavrič =

Slovenian footballer

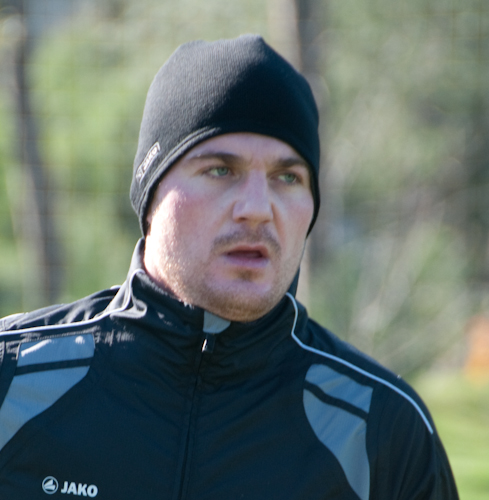

Personal information
- Full name: Klemen Lavrič
- Date of birth: 12 June 1981 (age 45)
- Place of birth: Trbovlje, SFR Yugoslavia
- Height: 1.88 m (6 ft 2 in)
- Position: Striker

Youth career
- Rudar Trbovlje

Senior career*
Years	Team	Apps	(Gls)
1998–2002	Rudar Velenje	89	(27)
2002–2003	Hajduk Split	7	(1)
2004	Inter Zaprešić	10	(3)
2004–2005	Dynamo Dresden	31	(17)
2005–2008	MSV Duisburg	69	(20)
2008–2009	Omiya Ardija	21	(5)
2009–2010	Sturm Graz	26	(8)
2011	St. Gallen	13	(1)
2011–2012	Karlsruher SC	31	(5)
2013–2014	Kapfenberger SV	3	(0)
Total		300	(87)

International career
1997	Slovenia U15	1	(1)
1996–1997	Slovenia U16	8	(2)
1998	Slovenia U18	6	(0)
2000–2001	Slovenia U20	5	(2)
1999–2003	Slovenia U21	23	(5)
2004–2008	Slovenia	25	(6)
- * Club domestic league appearances and goals as of 5 July 2013

Klemen Lavrič (born 12 June 1981) is a Slovenian retired footballer who played as a striker.

== Club career ==
Born in Trbovlje, Lavrič started playing football for domestic Rudar Trbovlje and later moved to Rudar Velenje. Hajduk Split was the first club outside of Slovenia for which he played, followed by Inter Zaprešić in Croatia. After this, Lavrič moved to German club Dynamo Dresden.

In the 2004–05 season he was voted the second best player of 2. Bundesliga, only beaten by Lukas Podolski. In the match against Rot-Weiß Erfurt, Lavrič scored in 66th minute a goal with a bicycle kick which was later voted as Goal of the Year in 2004 in Germany. In summer 2005, Lavrič joined Bundesliga MSV Duisburg. In 2005–06 season he scored six goals in 22 matches, but nevertheless Duisburg was relegated to the 2. Bundesliga. In the 2006–07 season, Lavrič scored 12 goals and was second team's leading scorer and sixth scorer in the second league. Duisburg was promoted again in the following season to the Bundesliga, but Lavrič received little opportunity for play and eventually also lost his place in the Slovenian national team.

After one year in Japan with Omiya Ardija he returned to Europe, this time playing for Sturm Graz in Austria (26 matches, 8 goals). In 2011, Lavrič played for Sankt Gallen 1879 where he scored in his debut match.

== International career ==
Lavrič made his debut for Slovenia in a September 2004 World Cup qualification match away against Scotland, coming on as a 64th-minute substitute for Ermin Šiljak, and earned a total of 25 caps, scoring 6 goals. His final international was a February 2008 friendly match against Denmark.

== Career statistics ==
=== Club ===
Club performance			League		Cup		League Cup		Total	
Season	Club	League	Apps	Goals	Apps	Goals	Apps	Goals	Apps	Goals
Japan			League		Emperor's Cup		J.League Cup		Total	
2008	Omiya Ardija	J1 League	18	5	0	0	2	1	20	6
2009	Omiya Ardija	J1 League	3	0	0	0	0	0	3	0
Country	Japan		21	5	0	0	2	1	23	6
Total			21	5	0	0	2	1	23	6

=== International ===
Slovenia national team
Year	Apps	Goals
2004	3	0
2005	4	1
2006	6	1
2007	11	4
2008	1	0
Total	25	6

=== International goals ===
Scores and results list Slovenia's goal tally first.

#	Date	Venue	Opponent	Score	Result	Competition
1	7 September 2005	Zimbru Stadium, Chişinău	Moldova	1–1	2–1	FIFA World Cup 2006 qualification
2	11 October 2006	Dinamo Stadium, Minsk	Belarus	2–1	2–4	UEFA Euro 2008 qualification
3	7 February 2007	Sports Park, Domžale	Estonia	1–0	1–0	Friendly match
4	8 September 2007	Stade Josy Barthel, Luxembourg	Luxembourg	1–0	3–0	UEFA Euro 2008 qualification
5	8 September 2007	Stade Josy Barthel, Luxembourg	Luxembourg	3–0	3–0	UEFA Euro 2008 qualification
6	12 September 2007	Arena Petrol, Celje	Belarus	1–0	1–0	UEFA Euro 2008 qualification
