= Ararat Arakelyan =

Armenian footballer

Personal information
- Full name: Ararat Arakelyan
- Date of birth: 1 February 1984 (age 42)
- Place of birth: Yerevan, Armenia
- Height: 1.90 m (6 ft 3 in)
- Positions: Defender; defensive midfielder

Senior career*
Years	Team	Apps	(Gls)
2002–2011	Banants Yerevan	147	(17)
2008–2011	→ Metalurh Donetsk (loan)	24	(3)
2011–2012	Mes Kerman	16	(1)
2012–2013	Banants Yerevan	24	(3)
2013–2014	Gandzasar Kapan	8	(1)
2014–2018	Alashkert	73	(3)

International career
2002–2006	Armenia U-21	13	(0)
2005–2011	Armenia	33	(2)
- * Club domestic league appearances and goals as of 1 November 2019

Ararat Arakelyan (Armenian: Արարատ Առաքելյան, born on 1 February 1984 in the Armenia), is a retired Armenian International footballer who played as either a defender or midfielder.

== Career ==
=== Club ===
On 20 July 2013, Arakelyan signed a one-year contract with Gandzasar Kapan.

=== International ===
Arakelyan was a member of the Armenia national team, and has participated in 33 international matches and scored 2 goals since his debut in away friendly match against Kuwait on 18 March 2005.

== Personal life ==
Arakelyan is the older brother of Artashes Arakelyan.

== Achievements ==
Banants Yerevan

- Armenian Cup: 2007

== National team statistics ==
Armenia national team
Year	Apps	Goals
2005	1	0
2006	0	0
2007	9	0
2008	9	1
2009	8	1
2010	4	0
2011	1	0
Total	33	2

== International goals ==
Ararat Arakelyan: International goals
No.	Date	Venue	Opponent	Score	Result	Competition
1	4 February 2008	Ta' Qali Stadium, Attard, Malta	Belarus	1-1	2-1	Malta Tmt.
2	12 August 2009	Hanrapetakan Stadium, Yerevan, Armenia	Moldova	1-2	1-4	Friendly
