= 2002 LG Cup (Russia) =

2002 LG Cup Four Nations Tournament
Tournament details
- Host country: Russia
- City: Moscow
- Dates: 17–19 May
- Teams: 4
- Venue: 1 (in 1 host city)

Final positions
- Champions: Belarus (1st title)
- Runners-up: Ukraine
- Third place: FR Yugoslavia
- Fourth place: Russia

Tournament statistics
- Matches played: 4
- Goals scored: 8 (2 per match)
- Top scorer: (Belarus) Valyantsin Byalkevich (2 goals)

The second LG Cup is an exhibition association football tournament that took place in Russia.

== Participants ==
The participants were:

- Russia
- Belarus
- FR Yugoslavia
- Ukraine

== Results ==
=== Semifinals ===
17 May 2002

Russia	1–1	Belarus
Solomatin 28' (pen.)	Report	Byalkevich 15'
Penalties
	4–5

Dinamo stadium, Moskva, Russia
Attendance: 16,000
Referee: Viktor Kassai (Hungary)

17 May 2002

Ukraine	2–0	FR Yugoslavia
Popov 27'; Musolitin 78'	Report

Dinamo stadium, Moskva, Russia
Attendance: 7,000
Referee: Paulius Malzinskas (Lithuania)

=== Third place match ===
19 May 2002

Russia	1–1	FR Yugoslavia
Sychov 87'	Report	Kovacevic 54'
Penalties
	5–6

Dinamo stadium, Moskva, Russia
Attendance: 12,000
Referee: Viktor Kassai (Hungary)

=== Final ===
19 May 2002

Belarus	2–0	Ukraine
Byalkevich 48'; Hleb 63'	Report

Dinamo stadium, Moskva, Russia
Attendance: 5,000
Referee: Paulius Malzinskas (Lithuania)

2002 LG Cup (Russia) winner

Belarus
First title

== Top scorers ==
2 goals

- (Belarus) Valyantsin Byalkevich

1 goal

- (Belarus) Alyaksandr Hleb
- (Federal Republic of Yugoslavia) Darko Kovacevic
- (Russia) Dmitriy Sychov
- (Russia) Andrei Solomatin
- (Ukraine) Serhiy Popov
- (Ukraine) Volodymyr Musolitin

== See also ==
- LG Cup
