= Alexander Hleb =

Belarusian footballer (born 1981)

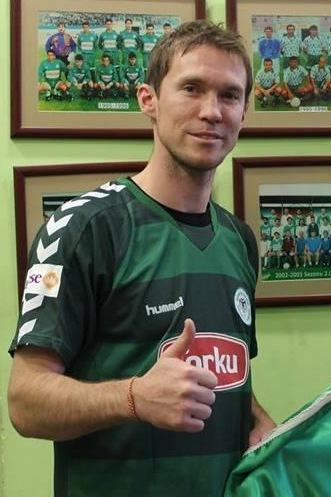
- Hleb with Konyaspor in 2014

Personal information
- Full name: Aliaksandr Paulavich Hleb
- Date of birth: 1 May 1981 (age 45)
- Place of birth: Minsk, Byelorussian SSR, Soviet Union
- Height: 1.85 m (6 ft 1 in)
- Positions: Attacking midfielder; winger

Youth career
- 1997–1998: Dinamo-Juni Minsk
- 1998–1999: BATE Borisov

Senior career*
Years	Team	Apps	(Gls)
1998	Dinamo-Juni Minsk	11	(1)
1999–2000	BATE Borisov	25	(4)
2000–2001	VfB Stuttgart II	17	(4)
2000–2005	VfB Stuttgart	137	(13)
2005–2008	Arsenal	89	(7)
2008–2012	Barcelona	19	(0)
2009–2010	→ VfB Stuttgart (loan)	27	(0)
2010–2011	→ Birmingham City (loan)	19	(1)
2011	→ VfL Wolfsburg (loan)	4	(1)
2012	Krylia Sovetov Samara	8	(0)
2012–2013	BATE Borisov	29	(3)
2014	Konyaspor	30	(2)
2015	Gençlerbirliği	15	(2)
2015	BATE Borisov	4	(0)
2016	Gençlerbirliği	12	(0)
2016	BATE Borisov	6	(0)
2017	Krylia Sovetov Samara	7	(0)
2018–2019	BATE Borisov	16	(0)
2019	Isloch Minsk Raion	13	(0)
Total		488	(38)

International career
2000–2004	Belarus U21	24	(5)
2001–2019	Belarus	80	(6)
- * Club domestic league appearances and goals

Aliaksandr Paulavich Hleb (Belarusian: Аляксандр Паўлавіч Глеб, Belarusian: [alʲakˈsand(a)r ˈɣlʲɛp]; Russian: Александр Павлович Глеб; born 1 May 1981), commonly referred to in English as Alexander Hleb, is a Belarusian former professional footballer.

Hleb's natural and preferred position is attacking midfielder or "in the hole" behind the strikers, but he was often deployed on the wing. He is known for his passing, agility and dribbling ability. A full international for Belarus since 2001, he won 80 caps for his country.

== Early life ==
Hleb grew up in Minsk. His mother worked on a construction site while his father drove petrol tankers. His father had volunteered to help demolish houses in Ukraine made uninhabitable as the result of the Chernobyl nuclear disaster. Hleb believes this exposure to radiation caused his father's ill health. Before getting involved with football, Hleb was a keen swimmer and gymnast. His younger brother Vyacheslav was also a footballer.

== Club career ==
=== VfB Stuttgart ===
Spotted by scouts, Alexander and his younger brother Vyacheslav were signed in 2000 by German Bundesliga side VfB Stuttgart for approximately €150,000. He made his Bundesliga debut on 5 September 2000 in an away match at 1. FC Kaiserslautern, coming on as a substitute for the last 20 minutes. Despite only making six league appearances in his first season with Stuttgart, Hleb became a regular at the club in his second season there and went on to establish himself as an important player for the team. In 2002, he was voted Belarusian Footballer of the Year.

In 2002–03, Stuttgart finished as runners-up in the Bundesliga and enjoyed a UEFA Champions League victory over Manchester United and Hleb had become established as the team's playmaker. After team manager Felix Magath left to join Bayern Munich in the summer of 2004, however, Stuttgart were not as successful under new coach Matthias Sammer, having finished the 2004–05 season in fifth place.

=== Arsenal ===
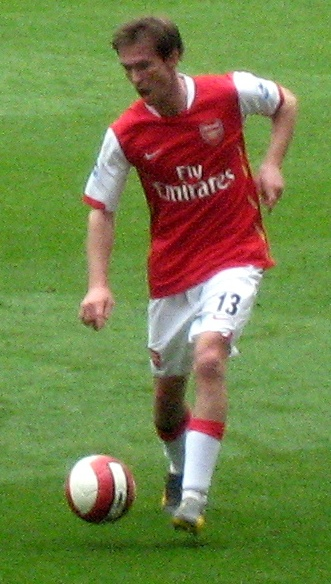
Hleb playing for Arsenal

In June 2005, Hleb joined English side Arsenal for a sum which had the potential to reach €15 million, on a four-year contract. Arsène Wenger used Hleb at many different midfield positions, but he mainly played on the right wing for Arsenal. His competitive debut was made in August 2005 against Chelsea in the 2005 FA Community Shield, and then he made his league debut as a substitute against Newcastle United. Soon after, Hleb sustained a knee injury while on international duty with Belarus and was out for several months, returning to the first team squad in December, and played 60 minutes in Arsenal's final UEFA Champions League group stage match against Ajax on 7 December. By January 2006, Hleb had established himself as a first choice player and scored his first goal for Arsenal in a 7–0 win over Middlesbrough. In May, Hleb became the first ever Belarusian footballer to play in the Champions League final. He ended the season with 40 appearances and three goals.

Despite a hamstring injury, Hleb made 48 appearances in the 2006–07 season and scored three goals. In 2007–08, he was moved from the right wing and played behind Robin van Persie as a withdrawn striker. When strikers Emmanuel Adebayor and Eduardo recovered from injuries Arsène Wenger reverted to a 4–4–2 formation and Hleb returned to playing on the wing. His season was cut short after he was banned for three games by the FA after he was charged with violent conduct in an incident with Graeme Murty of Reading during their 2–0 win. Hleb admitted his offence, ending his season.

=== Barcelona ===
On 16 July 2008, a medical examination was held for the player at FC Barcelona, with his transfer completed later that day for a fee of €15 million plus an additional €2 million if Barcelona won the La Liga title in 2008–09 or 2009–10 (which they did in 2008–09, bringing his total fee to €17 million). Hleb signed a four-year contract with a buy-out clause of €90 million.

In March 2009, after featuring irregularly for the team – starting only five games in La Liga – Hleb admitted that he would readily accept an offer from Bayern Munich, if such an opportunity arose in the summer. He said, "I am right in the best years of my career and I do not want to spend those years on bench. Bayern Munich is a special club, their interest in me is a delightful honour. Bayern is among the best teams in the world."

Hleb went on to win the 2008–09 treble with Barcelona in his first season with the club. Hleb featured briefly in the Copa del Rey final but did not play when Barcelona went on to beat Manchester United 2–0 in the Champions League final.

At the end of the season, Hleb turned down the opportunity to join, on loan, eventual 2009–10 treble winners Internazionale, and chose to join former club, VfB Stuttgart, on loan. Hleb played 55 minutes in the first game of the 2009–10 Bundesliga season, away to VfL Wolfsburg, a match Stuttgart lost 2–0. Then, after playing in Stuttgart's 4–2 victory over SC Freiburg, Hleb scored his first goal for Stuttgart, during a Champions League qualifier against Timișoara in a 2–0 away win for the German side.

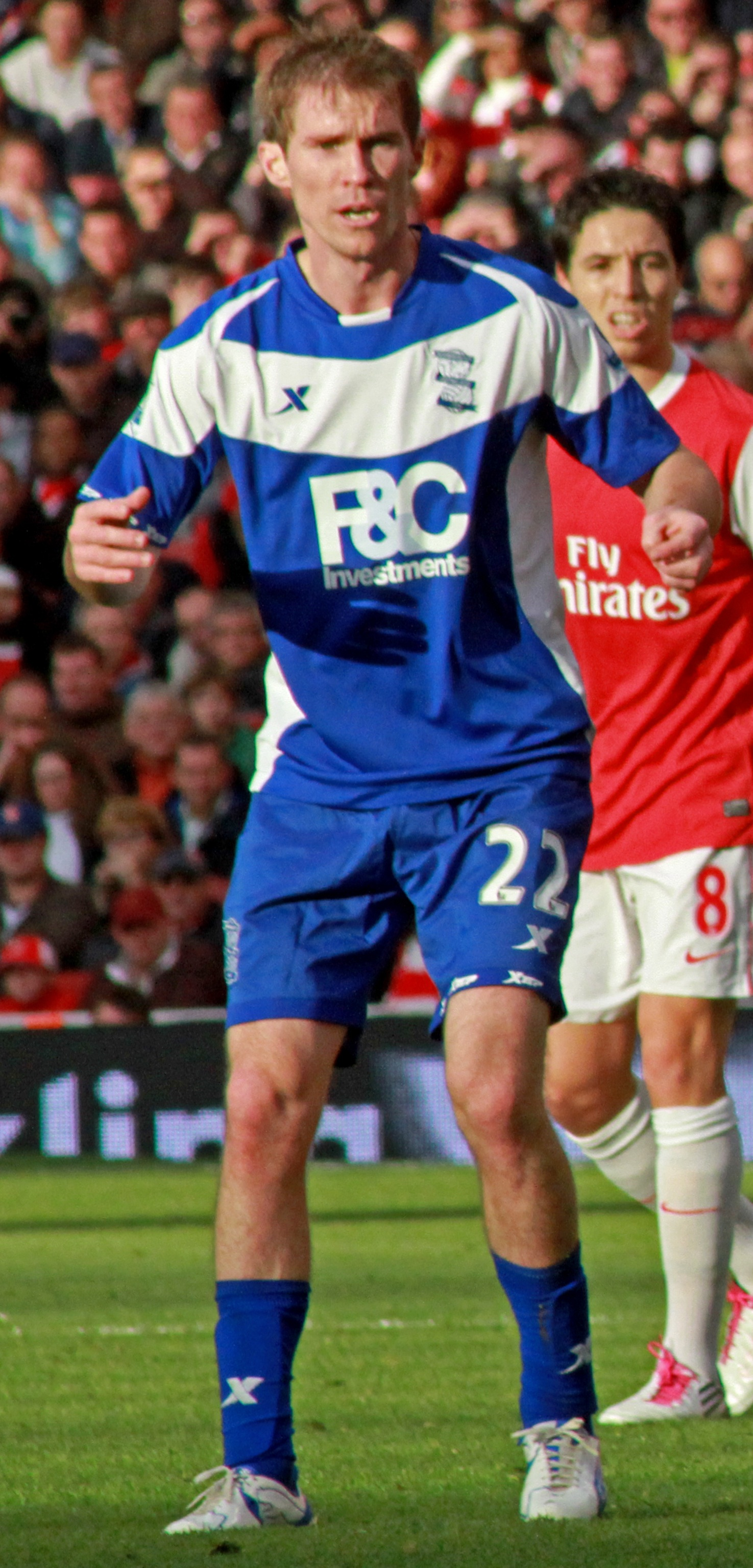
Hleb with Birmingham in 2010 playing against his former club Arsenal

On 31 August 2010, Hleb returned to England by signing a season-long loan deal with Premier League club Birmingham City. An ankle injury sustained on international duty delayed his debut until 18 September, when he played 83 minutes in a 3–1 defeat at West Bromwich Albion. Three days later, he opened the scoring as Birmingham beat Milton Keynes Dons 3–1 in the League Cup. Injury disrupted his season, forcing him to miss Birmingham City's victory over Arsenal in the League Cup final. Towards the end of the season, he ruled out a return to Birmingham once his loan expired, suggesting that their style of football was not suited to him, although he wanted to remain in the Premier League, ideally at Arsenal.

On 31 August 2011, Hleb was loaned out to VfL Wolfsburg. Again, injury disrupted his stay at Wolfsburg, making only one start and three appearances as a substitute. The club confirmed he would leave at the scheduled end of the loan on 31 December 2011.

=== Final stages in his club career ===
After Hleb's contract with Barcelona was cancelled by mutual consent during the January 2012 transfer window, he signed for Russian Premier League club Krylia Sovetov Samara until the end of the season.

On 26 July 2012, Hleb signed a contract with BATE Borisov and won the 2012 Belarusian Premier League in his return season. Hleb stated before BATE's 3–1 win against Bayern Munich that he expected the great performances of his team in the Champions League could help him to earn a move abroad, with the player wanting a move to a Bundesliga club. However, he remained playing for BATE in the 2013 season.

On 4 January 2014, Hleb signed a contract with Torku Konyaspor in the Turkish Süper Lig for one and a half years, with an option to extend the contract for an additional year. In February 2015, Hleb left Konyaspor for Süper Lig rivals Gençlerbirliği. Further spells at FK BATE Borisov, Krylia Sovetov Samara and Isloch Minsk Raion followed at the end of his club career.

== International career ==
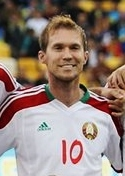
Hleb playing for Belarus

Hleb won 24 caps for the Belarus under-21 side. He made his full international debut as a substitute in a 1–0 defeat against Wales in 2001. He scored on his second international start in a 5–2 victory over Hungary in April 2002. He scored a goal in the finals of the 2002 LG Cup in Russia, which Belarus won.

In November 2006, former Belarusian captain Sergei Gurenko strongly criticised Hleb for not working hard in national team settings. Hleb, however, rejected any suggestion that he was a "prima donna". In August 2007, new national team manager Bernd Stange made Hleb team captain despite the criticism. On 22 August, Hleb wore the captain's armband for the first time in a 2–1 win against Israel. He was part of the team at the victorious friendly Malta International Football Tournament in 2008. Overall he won 80 caps, scoring six goals.

== Miscellaneous ==
Hleb was called "Zauberlehrling" or "Sorcerer's Apprentice" for his silky skills and dazzling tricks in Germany when he played in the Bundesliga.

== Personal life ==
In 2003, Hleb was involved in a car crash in Minsk, after which a passenger in the other car died in hospital. Hleb was cleared of any responsibility for the accident.

While playing for Arsenal, Hleb lived in Hampstead, North London. In a 2009 interview with The Guardian newspaper, Hleb confessed that the biggest regret of his life was leaving Arsenal for Barcelona.

Hleb was married to Anastasia Kosenkova, ex-singer of the Belarusian pop group Topless, from 2008 until 2014. In summer 2016, he married Sviatlana. His first child, a daughter, was born in December of that year. Sviatlana's daughter from a previous marriage lives with the couple.

== Career statistics ==
=== Club ===
Appearances and goals by club, season and competition
Club	Season	League			National Cup		League Cup		Continental		Other		Total		Ref.
Club	Season	Division	Apps	Goals	Apps	Goals	Apps	Goals	Apps	Goals	Apps	Goals	Apps	Goals	Ref.
Dinamo-Juni Minsk	1998	Belarusian First League	11	1			–		–		–		11	1	
BATE Borisov	1999	Belarusian Premier League	13	1			–		–		–		13	1	
BATE Borisov	2000	Belarusian Premier League	12	3			–		–		–		12	3	
BATE Borisov	Total		25	4			0	0	0	0	0	0	25	4	
VfB Stuttgart II	2000–01	Regionalliga Süd	17	4	1	0	–		–		–		18	4	
VfB Stuttgart	2000–01	Bundesliga	6	0	1	0	–		1	0	–		8	0	
VfB Stuttgart	2001–02	Bundesliga	32	2	3	0	–		–		–		35	2	
VfB Stuttgart	2002–03	Bundesliga	34	4	2	1	–		16	4	–		52	9	
VfB Stuttgart	2003–04	Bundesliga	31	5	3	0	1	0	8	0	–		43	5	
VfB Stuttgart	2004–05	Bundesliga	34	2	3	2	2	0	8	0	–		47	4	
VfB Stuttgart	Total		137	13	13	3	3	0	33	4	0	0	186	20	
Arsenal	2005–06	Premier League	25	3	1	0	3	0	10	0	1 (Note: Appearance in FA Community Shield)	0	40	3	
Arsenal	2006–07	Premier League	33	2	3	0	2	0	10	1	–		48	3	
Arsenal	2007–08	Premier League	31	2	2	0	1	0	8	2	–		42	4	
Arsenal	Total		89	7	6	0	6	0	28	3	1	0	130	10	
Barcelona	2008–09	La Liga	19	0	8	0	–		9	0	–		36	0	
Barcelona	2009–10	La Liga	0	0	0	0	–		0	0	0	0	0	0	
Barcelona	2010–11	La Liga	0	0	0	0	–		0	0	0	0	0	0	
Barcelona	2011–12	La Liga	0	0	0	0	–		0	0	0	0	0	0	
Barcelona	Total		19	0	8	0	0	0	9	0	0	0	36	0	
VfB Stuttgart (loan)	2009–10	Bundesliga	27	0	1	0	–		8	1	–		36	1	
Birmingham City (loan)	2010–11	Premier League	19	1	3	0	2	1	–		–		24	2	
VfL Wolfsburg (loan)	2011–12	Bundesliga	4	1	0	0	–		0	0	–		4	1	
Krylia Sovetov	2011–12	Russian Premier League	8	0	0	0	–		–		–		8	0	
BATE Borisov	2012	Belarusian Premier League	6	0	0	0	–		10	0	–		16	0	
BATE Borisov	2013	Belarusian Premier League	23	3	0	0	–		4	0	–		27	3	
BATE Borisov	Total		29	3	0	0	0	0	14	0	0	0	43	3	
Konyaspor	2013–14	Süper Lig	16	2	0	0	–		–		–		16	2	
Konyaspor	2014–15	Süper Lig	14	0	1	0	–		–		–		15	0	
Konyaspor	Total		30	2	1	0	0	0	0	0	0	0	31	2	
Gençlerbirliği	2014–15	Süper Lig	15	2	4	0	–		–		–		19	2	
BATE Borisov	2015	Belarusian Premier League	4	0	1	0	–		7	0	–		12	0	
Gençlerbirliği	2015–16	Süper Lig	12	0	0	0	–		–		–		12	0	
BATE Borisov	2016	Belarusian Premier League	6	0	0	0	–		3	0	–		9	0	
Krylia Sovetov	2016–17	Russian Premier League	7	0	0	0	–		–		–		7	0	
BATE Borisov	2018	Belarusian Premier League	15	0	3	0	–		9	1	–		27	1	
BATE Borisov	2019	Belarusian Premier League	1	0	1	0	–		2	0	1	0	5	0	
BATE Borisov	Total		16	0	4	0	0	0	11	1	1	0	32	1	
Isloch	2019	Belarusian Premier League	13	0	–		–		–		–		13	0	
Career total			488	38	42	3	11	1	113	9	2	0	654	51	

=== International ===
Appearances and goals by national team and year
National team	Year	Apps	Goals
Belarus	2001	1	0
Belarus	2002	7	2
Belarus	2003	3	0
Belarus	2004	2	0
Belarus	2005	8	1
Belarus	2006	7	1
Belarus	2007	10	0
Belarus	2008	6	0
Belarus	2009	5	1
Belarus	2010	5	1
Belarus	2011	1	0
Belarus	2012	2	0
Belarus	2013	7	0
Belarus	2014	2	0
Belarus	2015	5	0
Belarus	2016	6	0
Belarus	2017	0	0
Belarus	2018	2	0
Belarus	2019	1	0
Total		80	6

Scores and results list Belarus goal tally first, score column indicates score after each Hleb goal.

List of international goals scored by Alexander Hleb
No.	Date	Venue	Opponent	Score	Result	Competition
1	17 April 2002	Oláh Gábor utcai Stadion, Debrecen, Hungary	Hungary	1–1	5–2	Friendly
2	19 May 2002	Central Dynamo Stadium, Moscow, Russia	Ukraine	2–0	2–0	Friendly
3	9 February 2005	Dyskobolia Stadium, Grodzisk Wielkopolski, Poland	Poland	1–0	3–1	Friendly
4	16 August 2006	Dinamo Stadium, Minsk, Belarus	Andorra	1–0	3–0	Friendly
5	1 April 2009	Almaty Central Stadium, Almaty, Kazakhstan	Kazakhstan	1–1	5–1	2010 FIFA World Cup qualification
6	3 March 2010	Antalya Atatürk Stadium, Antalya, Turkey	Armenia	2–1	3–1	Friendly

== Honours ==
BATE Borisov

- Belarusian Premier League: 1999, 2012, 2013, 2015, 2016, 2018

VfB Stuttgart

- UEFA Intertoto Cup: 2002

Arsenal

- Football League Cup runner-up: 2006–07
- UEFA Champions League runner-up: 2005–06

Barcelona

- La Liga: 2008–09
- Copa del Rey: 2008–09
- UEFA Champions League: 2008–09

Birmingham City

- Football League Cup: 2010–11

Individual

- Belarusian Footballer of the Year: 2002, 2003, 2005, 2006, 2007, 2008
- Arsenal Player of the Month: August 2005
- kicker Team of the Year: 2004–05
- ADN Eastern European Footballer of the Season: 2006
