= Maksim Romashchenko =

Belarusian footballer

Maksim Romaschenko
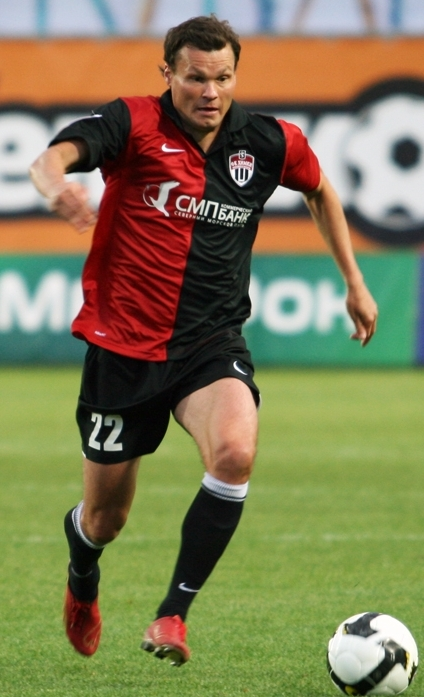
- Romaschenko playing for Khimki in 2009

Personal information
- Full name: Maxim Yorevich Romaschenko
- Date of birth: 31 July 1976 (age 50)
- Place of birth: Pavlohrad, Ukrainian SSR, Soviet Union (now Ukraine)
- Height: 1.78 m (5 ft 10 in)
- Position: Midfielder

Youth career
- Dnipro

Senior career*
Years	Team	Apps	(Gls)
1993	Polihraftekhnika Oleksandriya	17	(2)
1993–1994	Dnepr Mogilev	15	(1)
1994	Fandok Bobruisk	1	(0)
1995–1996	MPKC Mozyr	58	(21)
1997–2000	Dynamo Moscow	89	(15)
2000–2003	Gaziantepspor	62	(20)
2003–2004	Trabzonspor	20	(6)
2004–2006	Dynamo Moscow	43	(9)
2007	Torpedo Moscow	27	(15)
2008–2009	Bursaspor	36	(4)
2009	Khimki	8	(0)
2010	Salyut Belgorod	10	(1)
2010–2012	Dynamo Bryansk	52	(9)
2012–2013	Khimki	13	(0)
Total		451	(103)

International career
1995–1997	Belarus U21	12	(5)
1998–2008	Belarus	64	(20)

Managerial career
- 2022–2023: Strogino Moscow (academy)
- 2023–2024: FShM Moscow (academy)
- 2024: Metallurg Lipetsk
- * Club domestic league appearances and goals

Maksim Yorevich Romaschenko (Belarusian: Максім Рамашчанка, romanized: Maksim Ramashchanka, Ukrainian: Макси́м Ю́рійович Рома́щенко, romanized: Maksym Yuriyovych Romashchenko; born 31 July 1976) is a Ukrainian-Belorussian professional football coach and former player, who played as a midfielder, most notably for Dynamo Moscow. He made 64 appearances for the Belarus national team and is the country's record goalscorer.

== Club career ==
Romaschenko played for Dnepr Mogilev, Poligraphtekhnika Oleksandria, Fandok Bobruisk, MPKC Mozyr, Gaziantepspor, Trabzonspor, Dynamo Moscow, Torpedo Moscow and Bursaspor.

== Personal life ==
His older brother, Miroslav Romaschenko and his nephew Nikita Romaschenko (Miroslav's son) were both professional footballers as well.

== Career statistics ==
=== International ===
Appearances and goals by national team and year
National team	Year	Apps	Goals
Belarus	1998	4	2
Belarus	1999	9	0
Belarus	2000	6	0
Belarus	2001	4	0
Belarus	2002	6	2
Belarus	2003	8	1
Belarus	2004	8	8
Belarus	2005	2	0
Belarus	2006	5	1
Belarus	2007	7	5
Belarus	2008	5	1
Total		64	20

Scores and results list Belarus goal tally first, score column indicates score after each Romaschenko goal.

List of international goals scored by Maksim Romaschenko
No.	Date	Venue	Opponent	Score	Result	Competition
1	7 June 1998	Dinamo Stadium, Minsk, Belarus	Lithuania	5–0	5–0	Friendly
2	19 August 1998	Žalgiris Stadium, Vilnius, Lithuania	Lithuania	3–0	3–0	Friendly
3	21 August 2002	Skonto Stadium, Riga, Latvia	Latvia	3–2	4–2	Friendly
4	21 August 2002	Skonto Stadium, Riga, Latvia	Latvia	4–2	4–2	Friendly
5	20 August 2003	Dinamo Stadium, Minsk, Belarus	Iran	1–0	2–1	Friendly
6	18 February 2004	Dasaki Stadium, Achna, Cyprus	Cyprus	1–0	2–0	2004 Cyprus International Football Tournament
7	18 February 2004	Dasaki Stadium, Achna, Cyprus	Cyprus	2–0	2–0	2004 Cyprus International Football Tournament
8	21 February 2004	GSZ Stadium, Larnaca, Cyprus	Latvia	2–1	4–1	2004 Cyprus International Football Tournament
9	21 February 2004	GSZ Stadium, Larnaca, Cyprus	Latvia	3–1	4–1	2004 Cyprus International Football Tournament
10	21 February 2004	GSZ Stadium, Larnaca, Cyprus	Latvia	4–1	4–1	2004 Cyprus International Football Tournament
11	9 October 2004	Dinamo Stadium, Minsk, Belarus	Moldova	4–0	4–0	2006 FIFA World Cup qualification
12	13 October 2004	Stadio Ennio Tardini, Parma, Italy	Italy	1–2	3–4	2006 FIFA World Cup qualification
13	13 October 2004	Stadio Ennio Tardini, Parma, Italy	Italy	3–4	3–4	2006 FIFA World Cup qualification
14	2 September 2006	Dinamo Stadium, Minsk, Belarus	Albania	2–1	2–2	UEFA Euro 2008 qualification
15	22 August 2007	Dinamo Stadium, Minsk, Belarus	Israel	2–1	2–1	Friendly
16	8 September 2007	Dinamo Stadium, Minsk, Belarus	Romania	1–1	1–3	UEFA Euro 2008 qualification
17	17 October 2007	Ramat Gan Stadium, Ramat Gan, Israel	Israel	1–1	1–2	Friendly
18	17 November 2007	Qemal Stafa Stadium, Tirana, Albania	Albania	1–0	4–2	UEFA Euro 2008 qualification
19	17 November 2007	Qemal Stafa Stadium, Tirana, Albania	Albania	4–2	4–2	UEFA Euro 2008 qualification
20	6 February 2008	Ta' Qali National Stadium, Attard, Malta	Malta	1–0	1–0	2008 Malta International Football Tournament

== Honours ==
MPKC Mozyr

- Belarusian Premier League: 1996
- Belarusian Cup: 1995–96

Trabzonspor

- Turkish Cup: 2003–04

Individual

- Belarusian Footballer of the Year: 2004
