= Vyacheslav Hleb =

Belarusian footballer (born 1983)

Personal information
- Full name: Vyacheslav Paulavich Hleb
- Date of birth: 12 February 1983 (age 43)
- Place of birth: Minsk, Byelorussian SSR, Soviet Union
- Height: 1.81 m (5 ft 11 in)
- Positions: Midfielder; forward

Senior career*
Years	Team	Apps	(Gls)
2000–2001	Dinamo-Juni Minsk	9	(6)
2001–2004	VfB Stuttgart II	49	(9)
2004–2005	Hamburger SV	10	(0)
2005	Grasshopper	8	(0)
2005–2008	MTZ-RIPO Minsk	72	(29)
2009–2010	Shanghai Shenhua	27	(7)
2010	→ Shenzhen Ruby (loan)	24	(6)
2011	Dinamo Minsk	11	(2)
2011	FSV Frankfurt	7	(0)
2012	Gomel	14	(2)
2012–2013	AEL Kalloni	4	(0)
2013–2015	Torpedo-BelAZ Zhodino	80	(16)
2016–2017	Krumkachy Minsk	38	(8)
2017–2018	Neman Grodno	18	(3)
2019–2020	Arsenal Dzerzhinsk	26	(13)
Total		397	(101)

International career
	Belarus U17	3	(0)
	Belarus U19	3	(1)
2002–2005	Belarus U21	15	(5)
2004–2011	Belarus	45	(12)
- * Club domestic league appearances and goals

Vyacheslav Paulavich Hleb (Belarusian: Вячаслаў Паўлавіч Глеб; [vʲatʂaˈslau ɣlʲeb]; Russian: Вячеслав Павлович Глеб; born 12 February 1983) is a Belarusian former professional footballer who played as a midfielder or forward.

== Club career ==
Hleb has had unsuccessful trials with Scottish Premier League sides Inverness CT in 2005 and Hearts. In the summer of 2008, Hleb was close to being transferred to Dutch side Roda JC but the clubs could not agree.

On 10 February 2009, Hleb signed a two-year contract with Chinese Super League side Shanghai Shenhua. He played 27 league games and scored seven goals in Season 2009 but when Miroslav Blažević was appointed manager in December 2009, he decided that Hleb was not part of his plans to try and turn Shanghai Shenhua into league title contenders.

On 12 August 2010, Hleb transferred to Shenzhen Ruby on a loan deal. In 2011, he played for Dinamo Minsk as well as for FSV Frankfurt.

On 7 September 2012, AEL Kalloni from Football League (Greece) announced his transfer.

== International career ==
Hleb was also an international for the Belarus national team. He was capped 45 times and scored a dozen goals for the national side.

== Personal life ==
His older brother Alexander is also a footballer.

== Career statistics ==
Scores and results list Belarus' goal tally first, score column indicates score after each Hleb goal.

List of international goals scored by Vyacheslav Hleb
No.	Date	Venue	Opponent	Score	Result	Competition
1	18 August 2004	Atatürk Stadium, Denizli, Turkey	Turkey		2–1	Friendly
2	9 February 2005	Stadion Dyskobolia, Poland	Poland		3–1	Friendly
3	15 November 2006	A. Le Coq Arena, Estonia	Estonia		1–2	Friendly
4	7 February 2007	Azadi Stadium, Tehran, Iran	Iran	1–1	2–2	Friendly
5	7 February 2007	Azadi Stadium, Tehran, Iran	Iran	2–1	2–2	Friendly
6	4 February 2008	Ta' Qali National Stadium, Attard, Malta	Armenia		1–2	Friendly
7	26 March 2008	Dinamo Stadium, Minsk, Belarus	Turkey		2–2	Friendly
8	10 September 2008	Estadi Comunal d'Aixovall, Andorra	Andorra		3–1	World Cup qualification
9	11 August 2010	S. Darius and S. Girėnas Stadium, Kaunas, Lithuania	Lithuania	1–0	2–0	Friendly
10	11 August 2010	S. Darius and S. Girėnas Stadium, Kaunas, Lithuania	Lithuania	2–0	2–0	Friendly
11	17 November 2010	Seeb Stadium, Seeb, Oman	Oman		4–0	Friendly
12	9 February 2011	Atatürk Stadium, Antalya, Turkey	Kazakhstan		1–1	Friendly

== Honours ==
MTZ-RIPO Minsk

- Belarusian Cup: 2007–08

Gomel

- Belarusian Super Cup: 2012

Torpedo-BelAZ Zhodino

- Belarusian Cup: 2015–16
