= Chris Sagramola =

Luxembourgish footballer (born 1988)

Personal information
- Full name: Chris Sagramola
- Date of birth: 25 February 1988 (age 38)
- Height: 1.71 m (5 ft 7 in)
- Position: Striker

Youth career
- Jeunesse Esch

Senior career*
Years	Team	Apps	(Gls)
2004–2009	Jeunesse Esch	52	(7)
2009–2010	UN Käerjéng 97	10	(0)
2010–2012	CS Pétange	27	(2)
2012–2013	FC RM Hamm Benfica	7	(0)
2013–2015	Union 05 Kayl-Tétange	30	(2)
2015–2017	FC Munsbach		

International career^{‡}
2005–2008	Luxembourg	9	(2)
- * Club domestic league appearances and goals as of 27 June 2023 ‡ National team caps and goals as of 1 February 2009

Chris Sagramola (born 25 February 1988) is a former Luxembourgish footballer. He last played as a striker for the Luxembourg national team and for domestic club side FC Munsbach.

== Club career ==
Raised at Jeunesse, Sagramola made his debut for the senior team in the 2004/2005 season. In early 2007, he went on trial at Swiss team FC Thun. He was as well in the Serie B Footballclub of Rimini Calcio, after he had a trial for 1. FC Nürnberg in Germany.

== International career ==
Sagramola made his debut for Luxembourg in a September 2005 World Cup qualification match against Portugal. He earned eight caps, scoring two goals. He played in two FIFA World Cup qualification matches.

Sagramola's late winner for the national side against Gambia in February 2007 secured Luxembourg's first international victory in almost twelve years.

=== International goals ===
Scores and results list Luxembourg's goal tally first.

#	Date	Venue	Opponent	Score	Result	Competition
1	7 February 2007	Stade Alphonse Theis, Hesperange, Luxembourg	Gambia	2–1	2–1	Friendly match
2	24 March 2007	Stade Josy Barthel, Luxembourg (city), Luxembourg	Belarus	1–2	1–2	2008 Euro qualifying
