= Dzyanis Kowba =

Belarusian footballer (1979–2021)

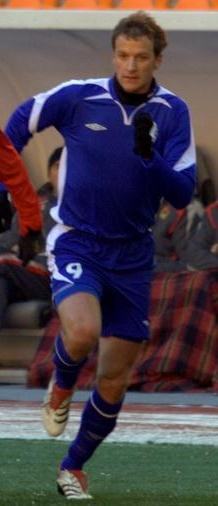
- Kowba in 2007

Personal information
- Full name: Dzyanis Yur'evich Kowba
- Date of birth: 6 September 1979
- Place of birth: Vitebsk, Byelorussian SSR, Soviet Union
- Date of death: 18 November 2021 (aged 42)
- Place of death: Moscow, Russia
- Height: 1.88 m (6 ft 2 in)
- Position: Defensive midfielder

Senior career*
| Years | Team | Apps | (Gls) |
| 1996–1998 | Lokomotiv Vitebsk | 41 | (1) |
| 1998–2000 | Zirka Kirovohrad | 36 | (1) |
| 1998–2000 | Zirka-2 Kirovohrad | 18 | (2) |
| 2000–2009 | Krylia Sovetov Samara | 247 | (8) |
| 2009–2010 | Sparta Prague | 13 | (0) |
| 2010–2011 | Krylia Sovetov Samara | 5 | (0) |
| 2012 | Oleksandria | 6 | (0) |
| 2012 | Khimki | 2 | (0) |
| 2021 | Gorodok Lions | 10 | (0) |
| Total | | 378 | (12) |

International career
| 2000–2001 | Belarus U21 | 10 | (0) |
| 2002–2007 | Belarus | 36 | (2) |

Managerial career
- 2013–2018: Krylia Sovetov Samara (assistant)
- 2018–2021: Vitebsk (assistant)
- * Club domestic league appearances and goals

Dzyanis Yur'evich Kowba (Belarusian: Дзяніс Юр'евіч Коўба, Russian: Денис Юрьевич Ковба, Denis Yuriyevich Kovba; 6 September 1979 – 18 November 2021) was a Belarusian professional footballer who played as a defensive midfielder. He was a member of Belarus national team between 2002 and 2007.

== Death ==
Kowba died on 18 November 2021, aged 42, from complications of COVID-19 amid the COVID-19 pandemic in Russia.

== International goals ==
Scores and results list Belarus' goal tally first, score column indicates score after each Kowba goal.

List of international goals scored by Dzyanis Kowba
| No. | Date | Venue | Opponent | Score | Result | Competition |
|---|---|---|---|---|---|---|
| 1 | 18 August 2004 | Denizli Atatürk Stadium, Denizli, Turkey | Turkey | 2–1 | 2–1 | Friendly |
| 2 | 11 November 2006 | Dinamo Stadium (Minsk), Belarus | Slovenia | 1–0 | 4–2 | Euro 2008 qualifier |

== Honours ==
Sparta Prague

- Czech First League: 2009–10
