= Armenia national football team results (2000–2009) =

This article details the fixtures and results of the Armenia national football team in 2000s.

== 2000 ==
9 January 2000 Friendly	Guatemala	1–1	Armenia	Los Angeles, United States
16:00 UTC-8	García 44'	Report	Manukyan 9'	Stadium: Los Angeles Memorial Coliseum; Attendance: 15,312; Referee: Brian Hall (United States)

2 February 2000 2000 Cyprus Tournament	Moldova	1–2	Armenia	Larnaca, Cyprus
14:30 UTC+2	Popovici 70'	Report	Nazaryan 45' Dokhoyan 90+5'	Stadium: Ammochostos Stadium; Attendance: 250; Referee: Michalis Paparvarnavas (Cyprus)

4 February 2000 2000 Cyprus Tournament	Cyprus	3–2 (a.e.t.)	Armenia	Strovolos, Cyprus
21:00 UTC+2	Melanarkitis 36' Špoljarić 43', 114'	Report	A. Petrosyan 50' Karamyan 74'	Stadium: Tsirion Athletic Center; Attendance: 600; Referee: Andreas Georgiou (Cyprus)

6 February 2000 2000 Cyprus Tournament	Georgia	2–1	Armenia	Limassol, Cyprus
14:30 UTC+2	Janashia 7' Menteshashvili 55'	Report	Khachatryan 44'	Stadium: Tsirio Stadium; Attendance: 6,000; Referee: Kostas Konstantinou (Cyprus)

26 April 2000 Friendly	Armenia	0–0	Georgia	Yerevan, Armenia
16:00 UTC+5		Report		Stadium: Hrazdan Stadium; Attendance: 22,000; Referee: Genadz Yakubovskiy (Belarus)

3 June 2000 Friendly	Lithuania	1–2	Armenia	Kaunas, Lithuania
17:00 UTC+2	Jankauskas 23'	Report	Movsisyan 4' Petrosyan 29'	Stadium: Darius and Girėnas Stadium; Attendance: 2,200; Referee: Taras Bezubyak (Russia)

2 September 2000 2002 World Cup qualification	Norway	0–0	Armenia	Oslo, Norway
16:00 UTC+2		Report		Stadium: Ullevaal Stadion; Attendance: 19,201; Referee: William Young (Scotland)

7 October 2000 2002 World Cup qualification	Armenia	2–3	Ukraine	Yerevan, Armenia
20:00 UTC+5	Arthur Petrosyan 17', 44'	Report	Shevchenko 45', 59' Husin 55'	Stadium: Hanrapetakan Marzadasht; Attendance: 14,000; Referee: Jorn Larsen (Denmark)

11 October 2000 2002 World Cup qualification	Belarus	2–1	Armenia	Minsk, Belarus
18:00 UTC+3	Khatskevich 23' Ryndzyuk 33'	Report	Khojoyan 50'	Stadium: Dinamo Stadium; Attendance: 21,700; Referee: Sorin Corpodean (Romania)

== 2001 ==
12 February 2001 Albena Mobitel Tournament	Uzbekistan	0–2	Armenia	Obrochishte, Bulgaria
13:00 UTC+2		Report	Artak Minasyan 22' Arthur Minasyan 80'	Stadium: Stadium Albena; Attendance: 11; Referee: Zhivko Dimitrov (Bulgaria)

24 March 2001 2002 World Cup qualification	Armenia	2–2	Wales	Yerevan, Armenia
19:00 UTC+4	Artak Minasyan 39' A. Movsisyan 67'	Report	Hartson 40', 48'	Stadium: Hanrapetakan Marzadasht; Attendance: 7,000; Referee: Georgios Kasnaferis (Greece)

28 March 2001 2002 World Cup qualification	Poland	4–0	Armenia	Warsaw, Poland
19:00 UTC+ 2	Michał Żewłakow 15' (pen.) Olisadebe 42' Marcin Żewłakow 81' Karwan 88'	Report		Stadium: Stadion Wojska Polskiego; Attendance: 10,320; Referee: Eric Poulat (France)

2 June 2001 2002 World Cup qualification	Armenia	0–0	Belarus	Yerevan, Armenia
20:00 UTC+5		Report		Stadium: Hanrapetakan Marzadasht; Attendance: 6,400; Referee: Anton Guenov (Bulgaria)

6 June 2001 2002 World Cup qualification	Armenia	1–1	Poland	Yerevan, Armenia
20:00 UTC+5	Arthur Petrosyan 11'	Report	Kałużny 4'	Stadium: Hanrapetakan Marzadasht; Attendance: 5,500; Referee: Eric Romain (Belgium)

1 September 2001 2002 World Cup qualification	Wales	0–0	Armenia	Cardiff, Wales
15:00 UTC+1		Report		Stadium: Millennium Stadium; Attendance: 20,000; Referee: Joseph Attard (Malta)

5 September 2001 2002 World Cup qualification	Ukraine	3–0	Armenia	Lviv, Ukraine
19:00 UTC+3	Shevchenko 11' Vorobey 85', 90'	Report		Stadium: Stadion Ukrajina; Attendance: 28,000; Referee: Loizos Loizou (Cyprus)

6 October 2001 2002 World Cup qualification	Armenia	1–4	Norway	Yerevan, Armenia
19:00 UTC+5	H. Hakobyan 72'	Report	Borgersen 49', 80' Carew 70', 89'	Stadium: Hanrapetakan Marzadasht; Attendance: 9,000; Referee: Andreas Schluchter (Switzerland)

== 2002 ==
7 June 2002 Friendly	Andorra	0–2	Armenia	Andorra la Vella, Andorra
		Report	Shahgeldyan 8' Karamyan 81'	Stadium: Estadi Comunal d'Andorra la Vella; Attendance: 300; Referee: Joaquim Paulo Paraty da Silva (Portugal)

7 September 2002 Euro 2004 qualifying	Armenia	2–2	Ukraine	Yerevan, Armenia
19:00 UTC+5	Petrosyan 73' Sarkisyan 90' (pen.)	Report	Serebrennikov 2' Zubov 33'	Stadium: Hanrapetakan Stadium; Attendance: 12,500; Referee: Mikko Vuorela (Finland)

16 October 2002 Euro 2004 qualifying	Greece	2–0	Armenia	Athens, Greece
20:00 UTC+3	Nikolaidis 2', 59'	Report		Stadium: Leoforos Alexandras Stadium; Attendance: 8,000; Referee: Darko Čeferin (Slovenia)

== 2003 ==
12 February 2003 Friendly	Israel	2–0	Armenia	Ramat Gan, Israel
18:00 UTC+2	Nimni 19' Zandberg 62'	Report		Stadium: Ramat Gan Stadium; Attendance: 6,000; Referee: Alfredo Trentalange (Italy)

29 March 2003 Euro 2004 qualifying	Armenia	1–0	Northern Ireland	Yerevan, Armenia
18:00 UTC+4	Petrosyan 86'	Report		Stadium: Hanrapetakan Stadium; Attendance: 10,321; Referee: Roland Beck (Liechtenstein)

2 April 2003 Euro 2004 qualifying	Spain	3–0	Armenia	León, Spain
21:45 UTC+2	Tristán 60' Helguera 69' Joaquín 90'	Report		Stadium: Nuevo Estadio Antonio Amilivia; Attendance: 13,500; Referee: Alon Yefet (Israel)

7 June 2003 Euro 2004 qualifying	Ukraine	4–3	Armenia	Lviv, Ukraine
19:00 UTC+3	Gorshkov 28' Shevchenko 65' (pen.), 73' Fedorov 90'	Report	Sarkisyan 15' (pen.), 52' Petrosyan 74'	Stadium: Ukraina Stadium; Attendance: 23,600; Referee: Hermann Albrecht (Germany)

6 September 2003 Euro 2004 qualifying	Armenia	0–1	Greece	Yerevan, Armenia
21:00 UTC+5		Report	Vryzas 36'	Stadium: Hanrapetakan Stadium; Attendance: 6,500; Referee: René Temmink (Netherlands)

10 September 2003 Euro 2004 qualifying	Northern Ireland	0–1	Armenia	Belfast, Northern Ireland
20:00 UTC+1		Report	Karamyan 27'	Stadium: Windsor Park; Attendance: 8,616; Referee: Anton Stredak (Slovakia)

11 October 2003 Euro 2004 qualifying	Armenia	0–4	Spain	Yerevan, Armenia
21:00 UTC+5		Report	Valerón 7' Raúl 76' Reyes 87', 90'	Stadium: Hanrapetakan Stadium; Attendance: 15,000; Referee: Urs Meier (Switzerland)

== 2004 ==
18 February 2004 2004 Cyprus Tournament	Hungary	2–0	Armenia	Paphos, Cyprus
19:00 UTC+2	Szabics 63' Lisztes 75'	Report		Stadium: Pafiako Stadium; Attendance: 300; Referee: Panagiotis Gerasimou (Cyprus)

19 February 2004 2004 Cyprus Tournament	Kazakhstan	3–3 (3–2 p)	Armenia	Paphos, Cyprus
15:00 UTC+2	Zhumaskaliyev 53', 75' Finonchenko 76'	Report	Petrosyan 52' Art. Karamyan 72' Arm. Karamyan 82'	Stadium: Pafiako Stadium; Attendance: 100; Referee: Loizos Loizou (Cyprus)

21 February 2004 2004 Cyprus Tournament	Armenia	2–0	Georgia	Nicosia, Cyprus
15:00 UTC+2	Arm. Karamyan 42' Art. Karamyan 52'	Report		Stadium: Makario Stadium; Attendance: 200; Referee: Panikos Kailis (Cyprus)

28 April 2004 Friendly	Armenia	1–0	Turkmenistan	Yerevan, Armenia
	Hakobyan 69'	Report		Stadium: Vazgen Sargsyan Republican Stadium; Attendance: 8,000; Referee: Merab Malaghuradze (Georgia)

18 August 2004 2006 World Cup qualification	Macedonia	3–0	Armenia	Skopje, Macedonia
20:00 UTC+2	Pandev 5' Šakiri 37' Šumulikoski 90'	Report		Stadium: Skopje City Stadium; Attendance: 4,375; Referee: Anton Guenov (Bulgaria)

8 September 2004 2006 World Cup qualification	Armenia	0–2	Finland	Yerevan, Armenia
21:00 UTC+5		Report	Forssell 24'; Eremenko 67'	Stadium: Vazgen Sargsyan Republican Stadium; Attendance: 2,864; Referee: Paulius Malzinskas (Lithuania)

9 October 2004 2006 World Cup qualification	Finland	3–1	Armenia	Tampere, Finland
17:00 UTC+3	Kuqi 9', 87'; Eremenko 28'	Report	Shahgeldyan 32'	Stadium: Ratina Stadion; Attendance: 7,894; Referee: Herbert Fandel (Germany)

13 October 2004 2006 World Cup qualification	Armenia	0–3	Czech Republic	Yerevan, Armenia
20:20 UTC+5		Report	Koller 3', 75' Rosický 30'	Stadium: Vazgen Sargsyan Republican Stadium; Attendance: 3,205; Referee: Jacek Granat (Poland)

17 November 2004 2006 World Cup qualification	Armenia	1–1	Romania	Yerevan, Armenia
19:00 UTC+4	Dokhoyan 60'	Report	Marica 29'	Stadium: Vazgen Sargsyan Republican Stadium; Attendance: 1,403; Referee: Frank De Bleeckere (Belgium)

== 2005 ==
18 March 2005 Friendly	Kuwait	3–1	Armenia	Al Ain, United Arab Emirates
	Asel 70' Al-Mutawa 79' Al-Subaih 90'	Report	Ham. Mkhitaryan 87' (pen.)	Stadium: Sheikh Khalifa International Stadium; Referee: Andreas Schluchter (Switzerland)

26 March 2005 2006 World Cup qualification	Armenia	2–1	Andorra	Yerevan, Armenia
18:00 UTC+4	Hakobyan 30' Khachatryan 73'	Report	Silva 56'	Stadium: Vazgen Sargsyan Republican Stadium; Attendance: 2,100; Referee: Joseph Attard (Malta)

30 March 2005 2006 World Cup qualification	Netherlands	2–0	Armenia	Eindhoven, Netherlands
20:30 UTC+2	Castelen 3'; Van Nistelrooy 33'	Report		Stadium: Philips Stadion; Attendance: 35,000; Referee: Matteo Trefoloni (Italy)

4 June 2005 2006 World Cup qualification	Armenia	1–2	Macedonia	Yerevan, Armenia
20:00 UTC+5	Manucharyan 55'	Report	Pandev 29', 47' (pen.)	Stadium: Vazgen Sargsyan Republican Stadium; Attendance: 2,870; Referee: Tomasz Mikulski (Poland)

8 June 2005 2006 World Cup qualification	Romania	3–0	Armenia	Constanța, Romania
20:30 UTC+3	Petre 29' Bucur 40', 78'	Report		Stadium: Stadionul Farul; Attendance: 5,146; Referee: Athanassios Briakos (Greece)

17 August 2005 Friendly	Jordan	0–0	Armenia	Amman, Jordan
		Report		Stadium: Amman International Stadium; Referee: Yousef Al Marzouq (Kuwait)

3 September 2005 2006 World Cup qualification	Armenia	0–1	Netherlands	Yerevan, Armenia
22:00 UTC+5		Report	Van Nistelrooy 64'	Stadium: Vazgen Sargsyan Republican Stadium; Attendance: 1,747; Referee: Stuart Dougal (Scotland)

7 September 2005 2006 World Cup qualification	Czech Republic	4–1	Armenia	Olomouc, Czech Republic
17:30 UTC+2	Heinz 47'; Polák 52', 76'; Baroš 58'	Report	Hakobyan 85'	Stadium: Andrův stadion Attendance: 12,015; Referee: Martin Hansson (Sweden)

12 October 2005 2006 World Cup qualification	Andorra	0–3	Armenia	Andorra la Vella, Andorra
16:00 UTC+2		Report	Sonejee 40' (o.g.) Hakobyan 52' Hakobyan 62'	Stadium: Estadi Comunal d'Aixovall; Attendance: 430; Referee: Ian Stokes (Ireland)

== 2006 ==
28 February 2006 2006 Cyprus Tournament	Romania	2–0	Armenia	Nicosia, Cyprus
17:00 UTC+2	Maftei 72' Cociș 86'	Report		Stadium: GSP Stadium; Attendance: 1,000; Referee: Ioannis Tsahilidis (Greece)

1 March 2006 2006 Cyprus Tournament	Cyprus	2–0	Armenia	Limassol, Cyprus
17:00 UTC+2	Okkas 18' Michael 61'	Report		Stadium: Tsirio Stadium; Attendance: 2,000; Referee: Mircea Salomir (Romania)

6 September 2006 Euro 2008 qualifying	Armenia	0–1	Belgium	Yerevan, Armenia
21:00 UTC+5		Report	Van Buyten 41'	Stadium: Vazgen Sargsyan Republican Stadium; Attendance: 4,122; Referee: Gerald Lehner (Austria)

7 October 2006 Euro 2008 qualifying	Armenia	0–0	Finland	Yerevan, Armenia
21:00 UTC+5		Report		Stadium: Vazgen Sargsyan Republican Stadium; Attendance: 2,800; Referee: Damir Skomina (Slovenia)

11 October 2006 Euro 2008 qualifying	Serbia	3–0	Armenia	Belgrade, Serbia
20:15 UTC+3	Stanković 54' (pen.) Lazović 62' Žigić 90+2'	Report		Stadium: Red Star Stadium; Attendance: 10,987; Referee: Georgios Kasnaferis (Greece)

15 November 2006 Euro 2008 qualifying	Finland	1–0	Armenia	Helsinki, Finland
19:00 UTC+2	Nurmela 8'	Report		Stadium: Telia 5G -areena Attendance: 9,445; Referee: Craig Thomson (Scotland)

== 2007 ==
14 January 2007 Friendly	Panama	1–1	Armenia	Los Angeles, United States
14:00 UTC-8	Tejada 52'	Report	Hakobyan 76' (pen.)	Stadium: Weingart Stadium; Attendance: 4,000

7 February 2007 Friendly	Andorra	0–0	Armenia	Andorra la Vella, Andorra
20:30 UTC+1		Report		Stadium: Estadi Comunal d'Andorra la Vella; Attendance: 1,200; Referee: Carlos Megía Dávila (Spain)

28 March 2007 Euro 2008 qualifying	Poland	1–0	Armenia	Kielce, Poland
20:30 UTC+3	Żurawski 26'	Report		Stadium: Kielce City Stadium; Attendance: 13,450; Referee: Alberto Undiano Mallenco (Spain)

2 June 2007 Euro 2008 qualifying	Kazakhstan	1–2	Armenia	Almaty, Kazakhstan
18:00 UTC+6	Baltiyev 88' (pen.)	Report	Arzumanyan 31' Hovsepyan 39' (pen.)	Stadium: Almaty Central Stadium; Attendance: 17,100; Referee: Pavel Královec (Czech Republic)

6 June 2007 Euro 2008 qualifying	Armenia	1–0	Poland	Yerevan, Armenia
20:30 UTC+5	Mkhitaryan 66'	Report		Stadium: Vazgen Sargsyan Republican Stadium; Attendance: 9,800; Referee: Cristian Balaj (Romania)

22 August 2007 Euro 2008 qualifying	Armenia	1–1	Portugal	Yerevan, Armenia
19:00 UTC+5	Arzumanyan 11'	Report	Ronaldo 37'	Stadium: Vazgen Sargsyan Republican Stadium; Attendance: 14,935; Referee: Claus Bo Larsen (Denmark)

8 September 2007 Euro 2008 qualifying	Azerbaijan	Cancelled	Armenia
		Report

8 September 2007 Friendly	Cyprus	3–1	Armenia	Achna, Cyprus
20:00 UTC+3	Michael 31' Okkas 42' Konstantinou 52'	Report	Arzumanyan 35'	Stadium: Dasaki Stadium; Attendance: 500; Referee: Leontios Trattou (Cyprus)

12 September 2007 Euro 2008 qualifying	Armenia	Cancelled	Azerbaijan
		Report

12 September 2007 Friendly	Malta	0–1	Armenia	Ta' Qali, Malta
20:15 UTC+2		Report	Voskanyan 26'	Stadium: National Stadium; Attendance: 200; Referee: Charles Richmond (Scotland)

13 October 2007 Euro 2008 qualifying	Armenia	0–0	Serbia	Yerevan, Armenia
20:00 UTC+5		Report		Stadium: Vazgen Sargsyan Republican Stadium; Attendance: 7,150; Referee: Stefan Johannesson (Sweden)

17 October 2007 Euro 2008 qualifying	Belgium	3–0	Armenia	Brussels, Belgium
20:45 UTC+2	Sonck 63' Dembélé 69' Geraerts 76'	Report		Stadium: King Baudouin Stadium; Attendance: 14,812; Referee: Johannes Valgeirsson (Iceland)

17 November 2007 Euro 2008 qualifying	Portugal	1–0	Armenia	Leiria, Portugal
21:00 UTC+1	Almeida 42'	Report		Stadium: Estádio Dr. Magalhães Pessoa; Attendance: 22,048; Referee: Mike Riley (England)

21 November 2007 Euro 2008 qualifying	Armenia	0–1	Kazakhstan	Yerevan, Armenia
19:00 UTC+4		Report	Ostapenko 64'	Stadium: Vazgen Sargsyan Republican Stadium; Attendance: 3,100; Referee: Bruno Faye (France)

== 2008 ==
2 February 2008 2008 Malta International Football Tournament	Malta	0–1	Armenia	Ta' Qali, Malta
16:15 UTC+1		Report	Hakobyan 69'	Stadium: National Stadium; Attendance: 1,000; Referee: Magnús Þórisson (Iceland)

4 February 2008 2008 Malta International Football Tournament	Armenia	2–1	Belarus	Ta' Qali, Malta
16:30 UTC+1	Arakelyan 18' Hakobyan 76'	Report	Hleb 5'	Stadium: National Stadium; Attendance: 100; Referee: Anton Zammit (Malta)

6 February 2008 2008 Malta International Football Tournament	Iceland	2–0	Armenia	Ta' Qali, Malta
16:30 UTC+1	Guðmundsson 45' Thorvaldsson 72'	Report		Stadium: National Stadium; Attendance: 1,000; Referee: Joseph Attard (Malta)

26 March 2008 Friendly	Armenia	1–0	Kazakhstan	Rotterdam, Netherlands
19:00 UTC+1	Manucharyan 62'	Report		Stadium: Sportpark Pernis; Attendance: 100; Referee: Pieter Vink (Netherlands)

28 May 2008 Friendly	Moldova	2–2	Armenia	Tiraspol, Moldova
19:00 UTC+3	Arakelyan 25' (o.g.) Alexeev 73'	Report	Pizzelli 25' Pachadzhyan 54'	Stadium: Sheriff Arena; Attendance: 3,653; Referee: Ihor Ishchenko (Ukraine)

1 June 2008 Friendly	Greece	0–0	Armenia	Offenbach am Main, Germany
21:15 UTC+2		Report		Stadium: Stadion am Bieberer Berg; Attendance: 8,032; Referee: Babak Rafati (Germany)

6 September 2008 2010 World Cup qualification	Armenia	0–2	Turkey	Yerevan, Armenia
21:00 UTC+5		Report	Şanlı 61'; Şentürk 77'	Stadium: Hrazdan Stadium; Attendance: 30,000; Referee: Tom Henning Øvrebø (Norway)

10 September 2008 2010 World Cup qualification	Spain	4–0	Armenia	Albacete, Spain
21:00 UTC+2	Capdevila 7'; Villa 16', 79'; Senna 83'	Report		Stadium: Estadio Carlos Belmonte; Attendance: 16,996; Referee: Tony Asumaa (Finland)

11 October 2008 2010 World Cup qualification	Belgium	2–0	Armenia	Brussels, Belgium
20:45 UTC+2	Sonck 21' Fellaini 37'	Report		Stadium: King Baudouin Stadium; Attendance: 20,949; Referee: Peter Rasmussen (Denmark)

15 October 2008 2010 World Cup qualification	Bosnia and Herzegovina	4–1	Armenia	Zenica, Bosnia and Herzegovina
20:15 UTC+2	Spahić 31' Džeko 39' Muslimović 56', 89'	Report	Minasyan 85'	Stadium: Bilino Polje; Attendance: 13,000; Referee: Asaf Kenan (Israel)

== 2009 ==
11 February 2009 Friendly	Armenia	0–0	Latvia	Limassol, Cyprus
15:00 UTC+2		Report		Stadium: Tsirio Stadium; Attendance: 150

28 March 2009 2010 World Cup qualification	Armenia	2–2	Estonia	Yerevan, Armenia
20:00 UTC+4	Mkhitaryan 33' Ghazaryan 87'	Report	Vassiljev 38' Zenjov 67'	Stadium: Vazgen Sargsyan Republican Stadium; Attendance: 3,000; Referee: Luc Wilmes (Luxembourg)

1 April 2009 2010 World Cup qualification	Estonia	1–0	Armenia	Tallinn, Estonia
18:00 UTC+3	Puri 83'	Report		Stadium: Lilleküla Stadium; Attendance: 5,200; Referee: Cyril Zimmermann (Switzerland)

12 August 2009 Friendly	Armenia	1–4	Moldova	Yerevan, Armenia
20:00 UTC+5	Arakelyan 75'	Report	Golovatenco 35', 62' Andronic 81' Epureanu 90' (pen.)	Stadium: Vazgen Sargsyan Republican Stadium; Attendance: 14,600; Referee: Lasha Silagava (Georgia)

5 September 2009 2010 World Cup qualification	Armenia	0–2	Bosnia and Herzegovina	Yerevan, Armenia
20:00 UTC+5		Report	Ibričić 6' Muslimović 74'	Stadium: Vazgen Sargsyan Republican Stadium; Attendance: 1,800; Referee: Eric Braamhaar (Netherlands)

9 September 2009 2010 World Cup qualification	Armenia	2–1	Belgium	Yerevan, Armenia
21:00 UTC+5	Goharyan 23' Hovsepyan 50'	Report	Van Buyten 90+2'	Stadium: Vazgen Sargsyan Republican Stadium; Attendance: 2,300; Referee: Ljubomir Krstevski (Macedonia)

10 October 2009 2010 World Cup qualification	Armenia	1–2	Spain	Yerevan, Armenia
21:00 UTC+5	Arzumanyan 58'	Report	Fàbregas 33' Mata 64' (pen.)	Stadium: Vazgen Sargsyan Republican Stadium; Attendance: 10,500; Referee: Jiří Jech (Czech Republic)

14 October 2009 2010 World Cup qualification	Turkey	2–0	Armenia	Bursa, Turkey
21:00 UTC+3	Altıntop 16' Çetin 28'	Report		Stadium: Bursa Atatürk Stadium; Attendance: 16,200; Referee: Martin Hansson (Sweden)

== See also ==
- Armenia national football team results (1992–1999)
- Armenia national football team results (2010–2019)
- Armenia national football team results (2020–present)
