= Armenia national football team results (2010–2019) =

This article details the fixtures and results of the Armenia national football team in 2010s.

== 2010 ==
3 March 2010 Friendly	Armenia	1–3	Belarus	Antalya, Turkey
15:00 (UTC+2)	Pachadzhyan 59'	Report	Putsila 58' A. Hleb 73' Rodionov 84'	Stadium: Antalya Atatürk Stadium; Attendance: 100; Referee: Audrius Žuta (Lithuania)

25 May 2010 Friendly	Armenia	3–1	Uzbekistan	Yerevan, Armenia
20:00	Mkhitaryan 67' Manucharyan 18' (pen.), 28'	Report	Geynrikh 67'	Stadium: Vazgen Sargsyan Republican Stadium; Attendance: 10,000; Referee: Levan Kvaratskhelia (Georgia)

11 August 2010 Friendly	Armenia	1–3	Iran	Yerevan, Armenia
21:00	Mkrtchyan 40'	Report	Aghili 70', 90+3' (pen.) Nosrati 71'	Stadium: Vazgen Sargsyan Republican Stadium; Attendance: 10,000; Referee: Levan Kvaratskhelia (Georgia)

3 September 2010 Euro 2012 qualifying	Armenia	0–1	Republic of Ireland	Yerevan, Armenia
20:00		Report	Fahey 76'	Stadium: Vazgen Sargsyan Republican Stadium; Attendance: 8,600; Referee: Zsolt Szabó (Hungary)

7 September 2010 Euro 2012 qualifying	Macedonia	2–2	Armenia	Skopje, Macedonia
20:00 (UTC+2)	Gjurovski 42' Naumoski 90+6' (pen.)	Report	Movsisyan 41' Manucharyan 90+1'	Stadium: Philip II Arena; Attendance: 9,000; Referee: Espen Berntsen (Norway)

8 October 2010 Euro 2012 qualifying	Armenia	3–1	Slovakia	Yerevan, Armenia
20:00	Movsisyan 23' Ghazaryan 50' Mkhitaryan 89'	Report	Weiss 37'	Stadium: Vazgen Sargsyan Republican Stadium; Attendance: 8,500; Referee: Daniele Orsato (Italy)

12 October 2010 Euro 2012 qualifying	Armenia	4–0	Andorra	Yerevan, Armenia
20:00	Ghazaryan 4' Mkhitaryan 16' Movsisyan 32' Pizzelli 52'	Report		Stadium: Vazgen Sargsyan Republican Stadium; Attendance: 12,000; Referee: Tomasz Mikulski (Poland)

== 2011 ==
9 February 2011 Friendly	Armenia	1–2	Georgia	Limassol, Cyprus
15:00 (UTC+2)	Manucharyan 63' (pen.)	Report	Iashvili 22' Siradze 34'	Stadium: Tsirion Stadium; Attendance: 300; Referee: Giannis Anastasiou (Cyprus)

26 March 2011 Euro 2012 qualifying	Armenia	0–0	Russia	Yerevan, Armenia
19:00		Report		Stadium: Vazgen Sargsyan Republican Stadium; Attendance: 14,400; Referee: Craig Thomson (Scotland)

4 June 2011 Euro 2012 qualifying	Russia	3–1	Armenia	Saint Petersburg, Russia
19:00 (UTC+2)	Pavlyuchenko 26', 59', 73' (pen.)	Report	Pizzelli 25'	Stadium: Petrovsky Stadium; Attendance: 18,000; Referee: Stéphane Lannoy (France)

10 August 2011 Friendly	Lithuania	3–0	Armenia	Kaunas, Lithuania
19:00 (UTC+3)	Klimavičius 9' Česnauskis 75' Beniušis 78'	Report		Stadium: Darius and Girėnas Stadium; Attendance: 500; Referee: Andrejs Sipailo (Latvia)

2 September 2011 Euro 2012 qualifying	Andorra	0–3	Armenia	Andorra la Vella, Andorra
18:00 (UTC+2)		Report	Pizzelli 34' Ghazaryan 75' Mkhitaryan 90+2' (pen.)	Stadium: Estadi Comunal; Attendance: 750; Referee: Alexander Kostadinov (Bulgaria)

6 September 2011 Euro 2012 qualifying	Slovakia	0–4	Armenia	Žilina, Slovakia
20:15 (UTC+2)		Report	Movsisyan 57' Mkhitaryan 70' Ghazaryan 80' Sarkisov 90+1'	Stadium: Stadium Pod Dubňom; Attendance: 7,238; Referee: Marcin Borski (Poland)

7 October 2011 Euro 2012 qualifying	Armenia	4–1	Macedonia	Yerevan, Armenia
20:00	Pizzelli 28' Mkhitaryan 34' Ghazaryan 69' Sarkisov 90+1'	Report	Šikov 86'	Stadium: Vazgen Sargsyan Republican Stadium; Attendance: 14,403; Referee: Robert Schörgenhofer (Austria)

11 October 2011 Euro 2012 qualifying	Republic of Ireland	2–1	Armenia	Dublin, Ireland
18:45 (UTC+1)	V. Aleksanyan 43' (o.g.); Dunne 59'	Report	Mkhitaryan 62'	Stadium: Landsdowne Road; Attendance: 45,200; Referee: Eduardo Iturralde González (Spain)

== 2012 ==
28 February 2012 Friendly	Serbia	2–0	Armenia	Limassol, Cyprus
16:00 (UTC+2)	Kuzmanović 15' Ivanović 30'	Report		Stadium: Tsirion Stadium; Attendance: 100; Referee: Leontios Trattos (Cyprus)

29 February 2012 Friendly	Canada	1–3	Armenia	Limassol, Cyprus
19:00 (UTC+2)	McKenna 4'	Report	Pizzelli 22', 67' Özbiliz 90' (pen.)	Stadium: Tsirion Stadium; Attendance: 100; Referee: Marios Panayi (Cyprus)

31 May 2012 Friendly	Greece	1–0	Armenia	Kufstein, Austria
20:30 (UTC+2)	K. Papadopoulos 24'	Report		Stadium: Kufstein Arena; Attendance: 600; Referee: Alexander Harkam (Austria)

5 June 2012 Friendly	Armenia	3–0	Kazakhstan	Yerevan, Armenia
20:00	Ghazaryan 9', 39' Movsisyan 43'	Report		Stadium: Vazgen Sargsyan Republican Stadium; Attendance: 7,500; Referee: Levan Kvaratskhelia (Georgia)

15 August 2012 Friendly	Armenia	1–2	Belarus	Yerevan, Armenia
20:00	Verkhawtsow 73' (o.g.)	Report	Bressan 44', 66'	Stadium: Vazgen Sargsyan Republican Stadium; Attendance: 6,500; Referee: Davit Kharitonashvili (Georgia)

7 September 2012 2014 World Cup qualification	Malta	0–1	Armenia	Ta' Qali, Malta
20:00 (UTC+2)		Report	Sarkisov 70'	Stadium: National Stadium; Attendance: 3,517; Referee: Rene Eisner (Austria)

11 September 2012 2014 World Cup qualification	Bulgaria	1–0	Armenia	Sofia, Bulgaria
21:00 (UTC+3)	Manolev 43'	Report		Stadium: Vasil Levski National Stadium; Attendance: 17,883; Referee: Stephan Studer (Switzerland)

12 October 2012 2014 World Cup qualification	Armenia	1–3	Italy	Yerevan, Armenia
21:00	Mkhitaryan 28'	Report	Pirlo 11' (pen.) De Rossi 64' Osvaldo 82'	Stadium: Hrazdan Stadium; Attendance: 25,000; Referee: Marijo Strahonja (Croatia)

14 November 2012 Friendly	Armenia	4–2	Lithuania	Yerevan, Armenia
19:00	Manucharyan 7' Mkrtchyan 50' Mkhitaryan 55' Özbiliz 72'	Report	Rimkevičius 7', 82' (pen.)	Stadium: Vazgen Sargsyan Republican Stadium; Attendance: 10,500; Referee: Lasha Silagava (Georgia)

== 2013 ==
5 February 2013 Friendly	Luxembourg	1–1	Armenia	Valence, France
19:45 (UTC+1)	Mutsch 15'	Report	Manucharyan 43'	Stadium: Stade Georges Pompidou; Attendance: 1,500; Referee: Rainville Nicolas (France)

26 March 2013 2014 World Cup qualification	Armenia	0–3	Czech Republic	Yerevan, Armenia
20:00		Report	Vydra 47', 81' Kolář 90+4'	Stadium: Vazgen Sargsyan Republican Stadium; Attendance: 14,403; Referee: Cristian Balaj (Romania)

7 June 2013 2014 World Cup qualification	Armenia	0–1	Malta	Yerevan, Armenia
20:00		Report	Mifsud 8'	Stadium: Vazgen Sargsyan Republican Stadium; Attendance: 8,500; Referee: Arnold Hunter (Northern Ireland)

11 June 2013 2014 World Cup qualification	Denmark	0–4	Armenia	Copenhagen, Denmark
20:15 (UTC+2)		Report	Movsisyan 1', 59' Özbiliz 19' Mkhitaryan 82'	Stadium: Parken; Attendance: 14,284; Referee: Aleksei Nikolaev (Russia)

14 August 2013 Friendly	Albania	2–0	Armenia	Tirana, Albania
20:45 (UTC+2)	Rama 21'; Kace 67'	Report		Stadium: Qemal Stafa Stadium; Attendance: 3,000; Referee: Stanislav Todorov (Bulgaria)

6 September 2013 2014 World Cup qualification	Czech Republic	1–2	Armenia	Prague, Czech Republic
18:00 UTC+2	Rosický 70'	Report	Mkrtchyan 30' Ghazaryan 90+2'	Stadium: Eden Arena; Attendance: 17,628; Referee: Antony Gautier (France)

10 September 2013 2014 World Cup qualification	Armenia	0–1	Denmark	Yerevan, Armenia
20:00		Report	Agger 73' (pen.)	Stadium: Vazgen Sargsyan Republican Stadium; Attendance: 23,000; Referee: Bas Nijhuis (Netherlands)

11 October 2013 2014 World Cup qualification	Armenia	2–1	Bulgaria	Yerevan, Armenia
19:00	Özbiliz 45+1' Movsisyan 87'	Report	Popov 61'	Stadium: Vazgen Sargsyan Republican Stadium; Attendance: 11,000; Referee: Felix Brych (Germany)

15 October 2013 2014 World Cup qualification	Italy	2–2	Armenia	Naples, Italy
20:45 (UTC+2)	Florenzi 24' Balotelli 76'	Report	Movsisyan 5' Mkhitaryan 70'	Stadium: Stadio San Paolo; Attendance: 22,000; Referee: Michael Oliver (England)

== 2014 ==
5 March 2014 Friendly	Russia	2–0	Armenia	Krasnodar, Russia
18:00	Kokorin 21' Kombarov 43' (pen.)	Report		Stadium: Kuban Stadium; Attendance: 22,000; Referee: Alberto Undiano Mallenco (Spain)

27 May 2014 Friendly	United Arab Emirates	3–4	Armenia	Carouge, Switzerland
19:00 (UTC+2)	Al Hammadi 40' Abdulrahman 52' Salem 85'	Report	Hayrapetyan 37' Mkhitaryan 42', 67' Hovsepyan 71'	Stadium: Stade de la Fontenette; Attendance: 1,500; Referee: Adrien Jaccottet (Switzerland)

31 May 2014 Friendly	Algeria	3–1	Armenia	Sion, Switzerland
18:00 (UTC+2)	Belkalem 13' Ghilas 21' Slimani 41'	Report	Sarkisov 46'	Stadium: Stade Tourbillon; Attendance: 14.000; Referee: Sascha Amhof (Switzerland)

6 June 2014 Friendly	Germany	6–1	Armenia	Mainz, Germany
20:45 (UTC+2)	Schürrle 52' Podolski 72' Höwedes 73' Klose 77' Götze 82', 89'	Report	Mkhitaryan 69' (pen.)	Stadium: Coface Arena; Attendance: 27,000; Referee: Harald Lechner (Austria)

3 September 2014 Friendly	Latvia	2–0	Armenia	Riga, Latvia
20:45 (UTC+3)	Šabala 16', 75'	Report		Stadium: Skonto Stadium; Attendance: 4,215; Referee: Gediminas Mažeika (Lithuania)

7 September 2014 Euro 2016 qualifying	Denmark	2–1	Armenia	Copenhagen, Denmark
18:00 (UTC+2)	Højbjerg 65' Kahlenberg 80'	Report	Mkhitaryan 50'	Stadium: Telia Parken; Attendance: 20,141; Referee: Alexandru Tudor (Romania

11 October 2014 Euro 2016 qualifying	Armenia	1–1	Serbia	Yerevan, Armenia
20:00	Arzumanyan 73'	Report	Z. Tošić 89'	Stadium: Vazgen Sargsyan Republican Stadium; Attendance: 8,500; Referee: Tom Harald Hagen (Norway)

14 October 2014 Friendly	Armenia	0–3	France	Yerevan, Armenia
20:00		Report	Rémy 7' Gignac 55' (pen.) Griezmann 84'	Stadium: Vazgen Sargsyan Republican Stadium; Attendance: 6,000; Referee: István Kovács (Romania)

14 November 2014 Euro 2016 qualifying	Portugal	1–0	Armenia	Faro/Loulé, Portugal
19:45 (UTC±0)	Ronaldo 72'	Report		Stadium: Estádio Algarve; Attendance: 21,042; Referee: Anastasios Sidiropoulos (Greece)

== 2015 ==
29 March 2015 Euro 2016 qualifying	Albania	2–1	Armenia	Elbasan, Albania
18:00 (UTC+2)	Mavraj 77' Gashi 81'	Report	Mavraj 4' (o.g.)	Stadium: Elbasan Arena; Attendance: 12,300; Referee: David Fernández Borbalán (Spain)

13 June 2015 Euro 2016 qualifying	Armenia	2–3	Portugal	Yerevan, Armenia
20:00	Pizzelli 14' Mkoyan 72'	Report	Ronaldo 29' (pen.), 55', 58'	Stadium: Vazgen Sargsyan Republican Stadium; Attendance: 14,527; Referee: Serge Gumienny (Belgium)

4 September 2015 Euro 2016 qualifying	Serbia	2–0	Armenia	Novi Sad, Serbia
20:45 (UTC+2)	Hayrapetyan 22' (o.g.) Ljajić 53'	Report		Stadium: Karađorđe Stadium; Attendance: 0 Referee: Miroslav Zelinka (Czech Republic)

7 September 2015 Euro 2016 qualifying	Armenia	0–0	Denmark	Yerevan, Armenia
20:00		Report		Stadium: Vazgen Sargsyan Republican Stadium; Attendance: 7,500; Referee: Svein Oddvar Moen (Norway)

8 October 2015 Friendly	France	4–0	Armenia	Nice, France
20:45 (UTC+2)	Griezmann 36' Cabaye 56' Benzema 78', 80'	Report		Stadium: Allianz Riviera; Attendance: 32 136; Referee: Slavko Vinčić (Slovenia)

11 October 2015 Euro 2016 qualifying	Armenia	0–3	Albania	Yerevan, Armenia
20:00		Report	Hovhannisyan 9' (o.g.) Djimsiti 23' Sadiku 76'	Stadium: Vazgen Sargsyan Republican Stadium; Attendance: 4,700; Referee: Szymon Marciniak (Poland)

== 2016 ==
25 March 2016 Friendly	Armenia	0–0	Belarus	Yerevan, Armenia
19:00		Report		Stadium: Vazgen Sargsyan Republican Stadium; Attendance: 4,500; Referee: George Vadachkoria (Georgia)

28 May 2016 Friendly	Guatemala	1–7	Armenia	Carson, United States
20:00 (UTC-7)	Ruiz 7'	Report	Mkhitaryan 39', 60', 70' Manucharyan 45' Kadymyan 50' Sarkisov 72' Badoyan 84'	Stadium: StubHub Center; Attendance: 7,200; Referee: Henry Bejarano (Costa Rica)

1 June 2016 Friendly	El Salvador	0–4	Armenia	Carson, United States
20:00 UTC-8)		Report	García 2' (o.g.) Hambardzumyan 8' Barseghyan 68' Kadymyan 75'	Stadium: StubHub Center; Attendance: 7,800; Referee: Mathieu Bourdeau (Canada)

31 August 2016 Friendly	Czech Republic	3–0	Armenia	Mladá Boleslav, Czech Republic
19:15 (UTC+2)	Krejčí 4' Kadlec 34' Kopic 86'	Report		Stadium: Městský stadion (Mladá Boleslav); Attendance: 4,351; Referee: Vladimir Vnuk (Slovakia)

4 September 2016 2018 World Cup qualification	Denmark	1–0	Armenia	Copenhagen, Denmark
18:00 (UTC+2)	Eriksen 17'	Report (FIFA); Report (UEFA)		Stadium: Parken Stadium; Attendance: 21,745; Referee: Harald Lechner (Austria)

8 October 2016 2018 World Cup qualification	Armenia	0–5	Romania	Yerevan, Armenia
20:00		Report (FIFA); Report (UEFA)	Stancu 4' (pen.) Popa 10' Marin 12' Stanciu 29' Chipciu 60'	Stadium: Vazgen Sargsyan Republican Stadium; Attendance: 5,500; Referee: Vladislav Bezborodov (Russia)

11 October 2016 2018 World Cup qualification	Poland	2–1	Armenia	Warsaw, Poland
20:45 (UTC+2)	Mkoyan 48' (o.g.) Lewandowski 90+5'	Report (FIFA); Report (UEFA)	Pizzelli 50'	Stadium: Stadion Narodowy; Attendance: 44,786; Referee: Ivan Kružliak (Slovakia)

11 November 2016 2018 World Cup qualification	Armenia	3–2	Montenegro	Yerevan, Armenia
21:00	A. Grigoryan 50' Haroyan 74' Ghazaryan 90+3'	Report (FIFA); Report (UEFA)	Kojašević 36'; Jovetić 38'	Stadium: Vazgen Sargsyan Republican Stadium; Attendance: 3,500; Referee: Pavel Královec (Czech Republic)

== 2017 ==
26 March 2017 2018 World Cup qualification	Armenia	2–0	Kazakhstan	Yerevan, Armenia
18:00	Mkhitaryan 73' Özbiliz 75'	Report (FIFA); Report (UEFA)		Stadium: Vazgen Sargsyan Republican Stadium; Attendance: 11,500; Referee: Aleksandar Stavrev (Macedonia)

4 June 2017 Friendly	Armenia	5–0	Saint Kitts and Nevis	Yerevan, Armenia
20:00	Koryan 19' Mkhitaryan 30', 40' Sarkisov 68' Yedigaryan 89'	Report		Stadium: Vazgen Sargsyan Republican Stadium; Referee: Lasha Silagava (Georgia)

10 June 2017 2018 World Cup qualification	Montenegro	4–1	Armenia	Podgorica, Montenegro
20:45 (UTC+2)	Bećiraj 2' Jovetić 28', 54', 82'	Report (FIFA); Report (UEFA)	Koryan 89'	Stadium: City Stadium; Attendance: 6,861; Referee: Kevin Blom (Netherlands)

1 September 2017 2018 World Cup qualification	Romania	1–0	Armenia	Bucharest, Romania
21:45 (UTC+3)	Maxim 90+1'	Report (FIFA); Report (UEFA)		Stadium: Arena Națională; Attendance: 27,178; Referee: Ivan Bebek (Croatia)

4 September 2017 2018 World Cup qualification	Armenia	1–4	Denmark	Yerevan, Armenia
20:00	Koryan 6'	Report (FIFA); Report (UEFA)	Delaney 16', 81', 90+3' Eriksen 29'	Stadium: Vazgen Sargsyan Republican Stadium; Attendance: 6,800; Referee: Bobby Madden (Scotland)

5 October 2017 2018 World Cup qualification	Armenia	1–6	Poland	Yerevan, Armenia
20:00	Hambardzumyan 39'	Report (FIFA); Report (UEFA)	Grosicki 2' Lewandowski 18', 25', 64' Błaszczykowski 58' Wolski 89'	Stadium: Vazgen Sargsyan Republican Stadium; Attendance: 5,478; Referee: Matej Jug (Slovenia)

8 October 2017 2018 World Cup qualification	Kazakhstan	1–1	Armenia	Astana, Kazakhstan
22:00 (UTC+6)	Turysbek 62'	Report (FIFA); Report (UEFA)	Mkhitaryan 26'	Stadium: Astana Arena; Attendance: 12,158; Referee: Alexandru Tean (Moldova)

9 November 2017 Friendly	Armenia	4–1	Belarus	Yerevan, Armenia
18:00	Özbiliz 41' Mkhitaryan 45' Hovsepyan 55' Vardanyan 84'	Report	Saroka 58' (pen.)	Stadium: Vazgen Sargsyan Republican Stadium; Attendance: 1,500; Referee: Lasha Silagava (Georgia)

13 November 2017 Friendly	Armenia	3–2	Cyprus	Yerevan, Armenia
18:00	Ishkhanyan 17' Haroyan 38' Mkhitaryan 63' (pen.)	Report	Laifis 50' Sotiriou 89'	Stadium: Vazgen Sargsyan Republican Stadium; Referee: George Vadachkoria (Georgia)

== 2018 ==
24 March 2018 Friendly	Armenia	0–0	Estonia	Yerevan, Armenia
18:00		Report		Stadium: Vazgen Sargsyan Republican Stadium; Attendance: 3,500; Referee: Giorgi Vadachkoria (Georgia)

27 March 2018 Friendly	Armenia	0–1	Lithuania	Yerevan, Armenia
19:00		Report	Verbickas 45'	Stadium: Vazgen Sargsyan Republican Stadium; Attendance: 4,300; Referee: Irakli Kvirikashvili (Georgia)

29 May 2018 Friendly	Malta	1–1	Armenia	Wattens, Austria
20:00 (UTC+2)	Agius 45+1' (pen.)	Report	Yagan 13'	Stadium: Gernot Langes Stadion; Referee: Julian Weinberger (Austria)

4 June 2018 Friendly	Moldova	0–0	Armenia	Kematen in Tirol, Austria
17:00 (UTC+2)		Report		Stadium: Sportplatz Kematen; Referee: Manuel Schüttengruber (Austria)

6 September 2018 2018–19 Nations League	Armenia	2–1	Liechtenstein	Yerevan, Armenia
20:00	Pizzelli 30' Barseghyan 76'	Report	S. Wolfinger 33'	Stadium: Vazgen Sargsyan Republican Stadium; Attendance: 5,132; Referee: Enea Jorgji (Albania)

9 September 2018 2018–19 Nations League	Macedonia	2–0	Armenia	Skopje, Macedonia
18:00 (UTC+2)	Alioski 14' (pen.) *Pandev 59'	Report		Stadium: Philip II Arena; Attendance: 4,730; Referee: Manuel Schüttengruber (Austria)

13 October 2018 2018–19 Nations League	Armenia	0–1	Gibraltar	Yerevan, Armenia
20:00		Report	J. Chipolina 50' (pen.)	Stadium: Vazgen Sargsyan Republican Stadium; Attendance: 11,000; Referee: Fedayi San (Switzerland)

16 October 2018 2018–19 Nations League	Armenia	4–0	Macedonia	Yerevan, Armenia
20:00	Pizzelli 12' Movsisyan 67' Ghazaryan 81' Mkhitaryan 90+4'	Report		Stadium: Vazgen Sargsyan Republican Stadium; Attendance: 8,300; Referee: Martin Strömbergsson (Sweden)

16 November 2018 2018–19 Nations League	Gibraltar	2–6	Armenia	Gibraltar
20:45 (UTC+1)	De Barr 10' Priestley 78'	Report	Movsisyan 27', 48', 52', 54' Kartashyan 66' Karapetian 90+4'	Stadium: Victoria Stadium; Attendance: 1,955; Referee: Kai Erik Steen (Norway)

19 November 2018 2018–19 Nations League	Liechtenstein	2–2	Armenia	Vaduz, Liechtenstein
20:45 (UTC+1)	Büchel 44' *Hasler 47'	Report	Adamyan 9' *Karapetian 85'	Stadium: Rheinpark Stadion; Attendance: 1,166; Referee: lain Durieux (Luxembourg)

== 2019 ==
23 March 2019 Euro 2020 qualifying	Bosnia and Herzegovina	2–1	Armenia	Sarajevo, Bosnia and Herzegovina
20:45	Krunić 33' Milošević 80'	Report	Mkhitaryan 90+3' (pen.)	Stadium: Stadion Grbavica; Attendance: 10,000; Referee: Jakob Kehlet (Denmark)

26 March 2019 Euro 2020 qualifying	Armenia	0–2	Finland	Yerevan, Armenia
21:00 UTC+4		Report	Jensen 14' Soiri 78'	Stadium: Vazgen Sargsyan Republican Stadium; Attendance: 12,900; Referee: Nikola Dabanović (Montenegro)

8 June 2019 Euro 2020 qualifying	Armenia	3–0	Liechtenstein	Yerevan, Armenia
20:00 UTC+4	Ghazaryan 2' Karapetyan 18' Barseghyan 90+1'	Report		Stadium: Vazgen Sargsyan Republican Stadium; Attendance: 9,200; Referee: Nikola Popov (Bulgaria)

11 June 2019 Euro 2020 qualifying	Greece	2–3	Armenia	Athens, Greece
21:45 UTC+3	Zeca 54' Fortounis 87'	Report	Karapetyan 8' Ghazaryan 33' Barseghyan 74'	Stadium: Olympic Stadium; Attendance: 7,011; Referee: Kristo Tohver (Estonia)

5 September 2019 Euro 2020 qualifying	Armenia	1–3	Italy	Yerevan, Armenia
20:00 UTC+4	Karapetyan 11'	Report	Belotti 28' Pellegrini 77' Ayrapetyan 80' (o.g.)	Stadium: Vazgen Sargsyan Republican Stadium; Attendance: 13,680; Referee: Daniel Siebert (Germany)

8 September 2019 Euro 2020 qualifying	Armenia	4–2	Bosnia and Herzegovina	Yerevan, Armenia
17:00 UTC+4	Mkhitaryan 3', 66' Hambardzumyan 77' Lončar 90+5' (o.g.)	Report	Džeko 13' Gojak 70'	Stadium: Vazgen Sargsyan Republican Stadium; Attendance: 12,457; Referee: Benoît Bastien (France)

12 October 2019 Euro 2020 qualifying	Liechtenstein	1–1	Armenia	Vaduz, Liechtenstein
20:45	Frick 72'	Report	Barseghyan 19'	Stadium: Rheinpark Stadion; Attendance: 2,285; Referee: István Kovács (Romania)

15 October 2019 Euro 2020 qualifying	Finland	3–0	Armenia	Turku, Finland
19:00 UTC+3	Jensen 31' Pukki 61', 88'	Report		Stadium: Veritas Stadion; Attendance: 7,231; Referee: Jesús Gil Manzano (Spain)

15 November 2019 Euro 2020 qualifying	Armenia	0–1	Greece	Yerevan, Armenia
21:00 UTC+4		Report	Limnios 35'	Stadium: Vazgen Sargsyan Republican Stadium; Attendance: 6,450; Referee: Paweł Raczkowski (Poland)

18 November 2019 Euro 2020 qualifying	Italy	9–1	Armenia	Palermo, Italy
20:45	Immobile 8', 33' Zaniolo 9', 64' Barella 29' Romagnoli 72' Jorginho 75' (pen.) Orsolini 78' Chiesa 81'	Report	Babayan 79'	Stadium: Stadio Renzo Barbera; Attendance: 27,752; Referee: Tiago Martins (Portugal)

== See also ==
- Armenia national football team results (1992–1999)
- Armenia national football team results (2000–2009)
- Armenia national football team results (2020–present)
