= UEFA Euro 1996 qualifying Group 2 =

Football tournament qualification stage

Qualifying Group 2 for the 1996 UEFA European Football Championship took place between 7 September 1994 and 15 November 1995 and consisted of Denmark, Spain, Belgium, Macedonia, Cyprus and Armenia.

Following the dissolution of the Soviet Union and the breakup of Yugoslavia, the tournament marked the first competitive matches for Armenia and Macedonia.

Spain qualified for UEFA Euro 1996 after a 1–1 draw with Denmark in their penultimate match secured their place as group winners. They were then joined by Denmark in qualifying for the tournament after a 3–1 win against Armenia in their final match would ensure they finished as one of the six best runners-up.

== Background ==
Following the Revolutions of 1989, the Soviet Union was dissolved and ceased to exist on 26 December 1991 while the breakup of Yugoslavia saw five new independent states established by the end of following year. As a result, neither Armenia nor Macedonia had played any competitive matches before.

UEFA Euro 1996 would be the first UEFA European Championship to feature 16 teams in the finals. Previous editions had only seen four or eight teams qualify.

Previously, Spain had qualified for the UEFA European Championships on four occasions and had won the competition once as hosts in 1964. Denmark had also qualified four times previously and were the defending champions after winning the competition in 1992. Belgium had qualified three times before but Cyprus had not previously reached the finals.

== Format ==
The group was contested as a double round robin in which each team would play every other team twice – once at home and once away. The group winner would qualify for UEFA Euro 1996. Of the eight groups, the six best runners-up would also qualify. The remaining two runners-up would contest a play-off to determine the final qualifier.

== Summary ==
The group began with a trio of matches on 7 September 1994. Macedonia drew with Denmark, Spain defeated Cyprus and Belgium defeated Armenia. The following month, Armenia and Cyprus drew goalless before Spain defeated Macedonia and Denmark defeated Belgium. In November, Cyprus and Spain recorded wins against Armenia and Denmark while Belgium drew with Macedonia. In the final matches of 1994, Macedonia defeated Cyprus and Spain defeated Belgium. That left Spain clear at the top of the standings with 12 points ahead of Macedonia on five, and Denmark, Cyprus and Belgium on four.

In March 1995, Denmark drew with Cyprus and Spain drew with Belgium. The following month, Spain, Denmark and Belgium recorded wins against Armenia, Macedonia and Cyprus respectively. In May, Armenia and Macedonia drew 2–2. The following month, Denmark, Belgium and Spain recorded wins against Cyprus, Macedonia and Armenia respectively. In August, Denmark recorded a 2–0 win against Armenia. With three rounds of matches left, Spain were top of the standings with 19 points ahead of Denmark on 14 and Belgium on 11.

Armenia, Denmark and Spain recorded wins against Macedonia, Belgium and Cyprus in September 1995. The following month, Spain qualified for UEFA Euro 1996 after a 1–1 draw with Denmark secured their place as group winners. Belgium defeated Armenia and Cyprus drew with Macedonia. In the final round of matches in November 1995, Denmark defeated Armenia 3–1 to secure second place and qualify as one of the best runners-up. Spain defeated Macedonia and Cyprus drew with Belgium.

== Standings ==
Pos	Team	Pld	W	D	L	GF	GA	GD	Pts	Qualification	(Spain)	(Denmark)	(Belgium)	(North Macedonia)	(Cyprus)	(Armenia)
1	Spain	10	8	2	0	25	4	+21	26	Qualify for final tournament	—	3–0	1–1	3–0	6–0	1–0
2	Denmark	10	6	3	1	19	9	+10	21	Qualify for final tournament	1–1	—	3–1	1–0	4–0	3–1
3	Belgium	10	4	3	3	17	13	+4	15		1–4	1–3	—	1–1	2–0	2–0
4	Macedonia	10	1	4	5	9	18	−9	7 (Note: Head-to-head points: Macedonia 4, Cyprus 1.)		0–2	1–1	0–5	—	3–0	1–2
5	Cyprus	10	1	4	5	6	20	−14	7		1–2	1–1	1–1	1–1	—	2–0
6	Armenia	10	1	2	7	5	17	−12	5		0–2	0–2	0–2	2–2	0–0	—

Rules for classification: Qualification tiebreakers

== Results ==
7 September 1994
20:15 UTC+2

Belgium	2–0	Armenia
Krbachyan 3' (o.g.); Degryse 73'

Constant Vanden Stock Stadium, Brussels
Attendance: 6,140
Referee: John Ferry (Northern Ireland)
7 September 1994
20:00 UTC+3

Cyprus	1–2	Spain
Sotiriou 37'		Higuera 18'; Charalambous 26' (o.g.)

Tsirion Stadium, Limassol
Attendance: 5,024
Referee: Marc Batta (France)
7 September 1994
18:00 UTC+2

Macedonia	1–1	Denmark
Stojkovski 5'		Povlsen 86'

Gradski Stadion, Skopje
Attendance: 22,000
Referee: Mario van der Ende (Netherlands)

8 October 1994
19:00 UTC+3

Armenia	0–0	Cyprus

Hrazdan Stadium, Yerevan
Attendance: 3,600
Referee: Zbigniew Przesmycki (Poland)

12 October 1994
19:15 UTC+1

Denmark	3–1	Belgium
Vilfort 35'; Jensen 72'; Strudal 86'		Degryse 31'

Parken Stadium, Copenhagen
Attendance: 40,075
Referee: Pierluigi Pairetto (Italy)
12 October 1994
19:00 UTC+1

Macedonia	0–2	Spain
		Salinas 16', 25'

Gradski Stadion, Skopje
Attendance: 21,000
Referee: Gerd Grabher (Austria)

16 November 1994
20:15 UTC+1

Belgium	1–1	Macedonia
Verheyen 31'		Boškovski 51'

Constant Vanden Stock Stadium, Brussels
Attendance: 5,839
Referee: Sergei Khusainov (Russia)
16 November 1994
18:30 UTC+2

Cyprus	2–0	Armenia
Sotiriou 7'; Fasouliotis 87'

Tsirion Stadium, Limassol
Attendance: 3,254
Referee: Gerald Ashby (England)
16 November 1994
21:30 UTC+1

Spain	3–0	Denmark
Nadal 41'; Donato 56'; Luis Enrique 87'

Estadio Ramón Sánchez Pizjuán, Seville
Attendance: 26,428
Referee: Jim McCluskey (Scotland)

17 December 1994
17:30 UTC+1

Macedonia	3–0	Cyprus
B. Gjurovski 14', 25', 90'

Gradski Stadion, Skopje
Attendance: 16,000
Referee: Hartmut Strampe (Germany)
17 December 1994
20:30 UTC+1

Belgium	1–4	Spain
Degryse 7'		Hierro 29'; Donato 56'; Salinas 68'; Luis Enrique 90'

Constant Vanden Stock Stadium, Brussels
Attendance: 15,074
Referee: Ahmet Çakar (Turkey)

29 March 1995
21:30 UTC+2

Spain	1–1	Belgium
Guerrero 24'		Degryse 26'

Estadio Ramón Sánchez Pizjuán, Seville
Attendance: 27,000
Referee: Rémi Harrel (France)
29 March 1995
20:00 UTC+3

Cyprus	1–1	Denmark
Agathokleous 45'		Schjønberg 2'

Tsirion Stadium, Limassol
Attendance: 7,261
Referee: Brendan Shorte (Republic of Ireland)

26 April 1995
17:30 UTC+4

Armenia	0–2	Spain
		Amavisca 49'; Goikoetxea 63'

Hrazdan Stadium, Yerevan
Attendance: 35,000
Referee: Adrian Porumboiu (Romania)
26 April 1995
19:15 UTC+2

Denmark	1–0	Macedonia
P. Nielsen 70'

Parken Stadium, Copenhagen
Attendance: 38,888
Referee: Karol Ihring (Slovakia)
26 April 1995
20:15 UTC+2

Belgium	2–0	Cyprus
De Bilde 20'; Schepens 47'

Constant Vanden Stock Stadium, Brussels
Attendance: 17,703
Referee: David Elleray (England)

10 May 1995
19:00 UTC+4

Armenia	2–2	Macedonia
Grigoryan 23'; Shahgeldyan 50'		Hristov 60'; Markovski 69'

Hrazdan Stadium, Yerevan
Attendance: 5,000
Referee: Christer Fällström (Sweden)

7 June 1995
19:15 UTC+2

Denmark	4–0	Cyprus
Vilfort 45', 50'; B. Laudrup 59'; M. Laudrup 76'

Parken Stadium, Copenhagen
Attendance: 40,199
Referee: Werner Müller (Switzerland)
7 June 1995
21:30 UTC+2

Spain	1–0	Armenia
Hierro 64' (pen.)

Estadio Benito Villamarín, Seville
Attendance: 12,000
Referee: Roger Philippi (Luxembourg)
7 June 1995
20:00 UTC+2

Macedonia	0–5	Belgium
		Grün 15'; Scifo 18', 59'; Schepens 27'; Versavel 43'

Gradski Stadion, Skopje
Attendance: 532
Referee: Ryszard Wójcik (Poland)

16 August 1995
19:00 UTC+4

Armenia	0–2	Denmark
		M. Laudrup 33'; A. Nielsen 46'

Hrazdan Stadium, Yerevan
Attendance: 22,000
Referee: Georg Dardenne (Germany)

6 September 1995
20:15 UTC+2

Belgium	1–3	Denmark
Grün 26'		M. Laudrup 20'; Beck 21'; Vilfort 85'

King Baudouin Stadium, Brussels
Attendance: 39,627
Referee: Vadim Zhuk (Belarus)
6 September 1995
20:00 UTC+2

Macedonia	1–2	Armenia
Micevski 56'		Grigoryan 61'; Shahgeldyan 78'

Gradski Stadion, Skopje
Attendance: 0
Referee: Vítor Melo Pereira (Portugal)
6 September 1995
21:30 UTC+2

Spain	6–0	Cyprus
Guerrero 45'; Alfonso 51'; Pizzi 75', 79'; Hierro 78'; Caminero 83'

Estadio Nuevo Los Cármenes, Granada
Attendance: 16,150
Referee: Dick Jol (Netherlands)

7 October 1995
20:00 UTC+4

Armenia	0–2	Belgium
		Nilis 28', 39'

Hrazdan Stadium, Yerevan
Attendance: 8,000
Referee: Mitko Mitrev (Bulgaria)

11 October 1995
19:15 UTC+1

Denmark	1–1	Spain
Vilfort 47'		Hierro 18' (pen.)

Parken Stadium, Copenhagen
Attendance: 40,262
Referee: Václav Krondl (Czech Republic)
11 October 1995
19:00 UTC+2

Cyprus	1–1	Macedonia
Agathokleous 90'		B. Jovanovski 35'

Tsirion Stadium, Limassol
Attendance: 4,513
Referee: Leslie Irvine (Northern Ireland)

15 November 1995
21:30 UTC+1

Spain	3–0	Macedonia
Kiko 8'; Manjarín 73'; Caminero 78'

Estadio Martínez Valero, Elche
Attendance: 21,350
Referee: Edgar Steinborn (Germany)
15 November 1995
19:15 UTC+1

Denmark	3–1	Armenia
Schjønberg 19'; Beck 33'; M. Laudrup 58'		Petrosyan 46'

Parken Stadium, Copenhagen
Attendance: 40,208
Referee: Gilles Veissière (France)
15 November 1995
19:00 UTC+2

Cyprus	1–1	Belgium
Agathokleous 18'		De Bilde 66'

Tsirion Stadium, Limassol
Attendance: 2,021
Referee: Graziano Cesari (Italy)

== Goalscorers ==
There were 81 goals scored in 30 matches, for an average of 2.7 goals per match.

5 goals

- (Denmark national football team) Kim Vilfort

4 goals

- (Belgium national football team) Marc Degryse
- (Denmark national football team) Michael Laudrup
- (Spain national football team) Fernando Hierro

3 goals

- (Cyprus national football team) Marios Agathokleous
- (North Macedonia national football team) Boško Gjurovski
- (Spain national football team) Julio Salinas

2 goals

- (Armenia national football team) Razmik Grigoryan
- (Armenia national football team) Armen Shahgeldyan
- (Belgium national football team) Gilles De Bilde
- (Belgium national football team) Georges Grün
- (Belgium national football team) Luc Nilis
- (Belgium national football team) Gunther Schepens
- (Belgium national football team) Enzo Scifo
- (Cyprus national football team) Andreas Sotiriou
- (Denmark national football team) Mikkel Beck
- (Denmark national football team) Michael Schjønberg
- (Spain national football team) José Luis Caminero
- (Spain national football team) Donato
- (Spain national football team) Luis Enrique
- (Spain national football team) Julen Guerrero
- (Spain national football team) Juan Antonio Pizzi

1 goal

- (Armenia national football team) Artur Petrosyan
- (Belgium national football team) Gert Verheyen
- (Belgium national football team) Bruno Versavel
- (Cyprus national football team) Costas Fasouliotis
- (Denmark national football team) John Jensen
- (Denmark national football team) Brian Laudrup
- (Denmark national football team) Allan Nielsen
- (Denmark national football team) Peter Nielsen
- (Denmark national football team) Flemming Povlsen
- (Denmark national football team) Mark Strudal
- (North Macedonia national football team) Zoran Boškovski
- (North Macedonia national football team) Gjorgji Hristov
- (North Macedonia national football team) Borče Jovanovski
- (North Macedonia national football team) Ljupčo Markovski
- (North Macedonia national football team) Toni Micevski
- (North Macedonia national football team) Mitko Stojkovski
- (Spain national football team) José Emilio Amavisca
- (Spain national football team) Andoni Goikoetxea
- (Spain national football team) Francisco Higuera
- (Spain national football team) Kiko
- (Spain national football team) Javier Manjarín
- (Spain national football team) Miguel Ángel Nadal
- (Spain national football team) Alfonso Pérez

1 own goal

- (Armenia national football team) Yervand Krbachyan (against Belgium)
- (Cyprus national football team) Marios Charalambous (against Spain)
