= Borče Jovanovski =

Macedonian footballer

Personal information
- Full name: Borče Jovanovski
- Date of birth: 30 October 1961 (age 65)
- Place of birth: PR Macedonia, FPR Yugoslavia
- Position: Defender

Senior career*
Years	Team	Apps	(Gls)
-1996	Teteks		
1996-1997	Vardar		
1998-1999	Makedonija		

International career
1995–1996	Macedonia	3	(1)

Managerial career
- 2017-2018: Novaci
- * Club domestic league appearances and goals

Borče Jovanovski (Macedonian: Борче Јовановски; born 30 October 1961) is a Macedonian former footballer who played as a defender and made three appearances for the Macedonia national team.

== International career ==
Jovanovski made his debut for Macedonia on 11 October 1995 in a UEFA Euro 1996 qualifying match against Cyprus, in which he scored Macedonia's only goal in the 1–1 draw. He went on to make three appearances, scoring one goal, before making his last appearance on 28 May 1996 in a friendly match against Bulgaria, which finished as a 0–3 loss.

== Career statistics ==
=== International ===
Macedonia
Year	Apps	Goals
1995	2	1
1996	1	0
Total	3	1

=== International goals ===
No.	Date	Venue	Opponent	Score	Result	Competition
1	11 October 1995	Tsirio Stadium, Limassol, Cyprus	Cyprus	1–0	1–1	UEFA Euro 1996 qualifying
