= Armenia national football team results (1992–1999) =

This article details the fixtures and results of the Armenia national football team in the 1990s (between 1992 and 1999).

Armenia national football
Year	Played	Won	Drawn	Lost	Goals	Points/Match
1992	1	0	1	0	0	
1993	No Match					
1994	5	1	1	3	1	
1995	7	1	1	5	5	
1996	9	1	3	5	5	
1997	9	1	2	6	5	
1998	5	3	1	1	6	
1999	9	1	1	7	5	
Total	45	8	10	27	27	

== 1992–1994 ==
Date	Venue	Opponents	Score	Competition	Att.	Armenia Scorers
14 October 1992	(Armenia); Yerevan	Moldova	0–0	Friendly		
16 May 1994	(United States); Fullerton	United States	1–0	Friendly		
16 July 1994	(Armenia); Yerevan	Malta	1–0	Friendly		Arsen Avetisyan
7 September 1994	(Belgium); Brussels	Belgium	2–0	UEFA Euro 1996 qualifying Group 2		
8 October 1994	(Armenia); Yerevan	Cyprus	0–0	UEFA Euro 1996 qualifying Group 2		
16 November 1994	(Cyprus); Limassol	Cyprus	2–0	UEFA Euro 1996 qualifying Group 2		

== 1995 ==
Date	Tournament	Location	Home team	Score	Away team	Armenia Scorers
26 April 1995	UEFA Euro 1996 qualifying Group 2	(Armenia); Yerevan	Armenia	0–2	Spain	
19 May 1995	UEFA Euro 1996 qualifying Group 2	(Armenia); Yerevan	Armenia	2–2	(North Macedonia); Macedonia	Razmik Grigoryan, Armen Shahgeldyan
7 June 1995	UEFA Euro 1996 qualifying Group 2	(Spain); Seville	Spain	1–0	Armenia	
16 August 1995	UEFA Euro 1996 qualifying Group 2	(Armenia); Yerevan	Armenia	0–2	Denmark	
6 September 1995	UEFA Euro 1996 qualifying Group 2	(North Macedonia); Skopje	(North Macedonia); Macedonia	1–2	Armenia	Razmik Grigoryan, Armen Shahgeldyan
7 October 1995	UEFA Euro 1996 qualifying Group 2	(Armenia); Yerevan	Armenia	0–2	Belgium	
15 November 1995	UEFA Euro 1996 qualifying Group 2	(Denmark); Copenhagen	Denmark	3–1	Armenia	Arthur Petrosyan

== 1996 ==
Date	Tournament	Location	Home team	Score	Away team	Armenia Scorers
17 January 1996	Friendly	(France); Vitrolles	Morocco	6–0	Armenia	
5 June 1996	Friendly	(France); Villeneuve-d'Ascq	France	2–0	Armenia	
20 June 1996	Friendly	(Peru); Lima	Peru	4–0	Armenia	
25 June 1996	Friendly	(Paraguay); Asunción	Paraguay	1–2	Armenia	Varazdat Avetisyan, Tigran Yesayan
30 June 1996	Friendly	(Ecuador); Portoviejo	Ecuador	3–0	Armenia	
31 August 1996	1998 FIFA World Cup qualification	(Armenia); Yerevan	Armenia	0–0	Portugal	
5 October 1996	1998 FIFA World Cup qualification	(Northern Ireland); Belfast	Northern Ireland	1–1	Armenia	Éric Assadourian
9 October 1996	1998 FIFA World Cup qualification	(Armenia); Yerevan	Armenia	1–5	Germany	Karapet Mikaelyan
9 November 1996	1998 FIFA World Cup qualification	(Albania); Tirana	Albania	1–1	Armenia	Hakob Ter-Petrosyan

== 1997 ==
Date	Tournament	Location	Home team	Score	Away team	Armenia Scorers
4 January 1997	Friendly	(Chile); Viña del Mar	Chile	7–0	Armenia	
6 January 1997	Friendly	(Paraguay); Asunción	Paraguay	2–0	Armenia	
30 March 1997	Friendly	(Georgia (country)); Tbilisi	(Georgia (country)); Georgia	7–0	Armenia	
30 April 1997	1998 FIFA World Cup qualification	(Armenia); Yerevan	Armenia	0–0	Northern Ireland	
30 March 1997	1998 FIFA World Cup qualification	(Ukraine); Kyiv	Ukraine	1–1	Armenia	Artur Petrosyan
20 August 1997	1998 FIFA World Cup qualification	(Portugal); Setúbal	Portugal	3–1	Armenia	Éric Assadourian
6 September 1997	1998 FIFA World Cup qualification	(Armenia); Yerevan	Armenia	3–0	Albania	Harutyun Vardanyan, Éric Assadourian, Garnik Avalyan
10 September 1997	1998 FIFA World Cup qualification	(Germany); Dortmund	Germany	4–0	Armenia	
11 October 1997	1998 FIFA World Cup qualification	(Armenia); Yerevan	Armenia	0–2	Ukraine	

== 1998 ==
Date	Tournament	Location	Home team	Score	Away team	Armenia Scorers
18 August 1998	Friendly	(Armenia); Abovyan	Armenia	1–0	Lebanon	Armen Adamyan
5 September 1998	UEFA Euro 2000 qualifying Group 4	(Armenia); Yerevan	Armenia	3–1	Andorra	Garnik Avalyan, Tigran Yesayan, Tigran Yesayan
10 October 1998	UEFA Euro 2000 qualifying Group 4	(Armenia); Yerevan	Armenia	0–0	Iceland	
14 October 1998	UEFA Euro 2000 qualifying Group 4	(Ukraine); Kyiv	Ukraine	2–0	Armenia	
21 November 1998	Friendly	(Armenia); Abovyan	Armenia	2–1	Estonia	Karen Barseghyan, Karen Simonyan

== 1999 ==
Date	Tournament	Location	Home team	Score	Away team	Armenia Scorers
3 March 1999	Friendly	(Poland); Warsaw	Poland	1–0	Armenia	
27 March 1999	UEFA Euro 2000 qualifying Group 4	(Armenia); Yerevan	Armenia	0–3	Russia	
31 March 1999	UEFA Euro 2000 qualifying Group 4	(France); Paris	France	2–0	Armenia	
5 June 1999	UEFA Euro 2000 qualifying Group 4	(Iceland); Reykjavík	Iceland	2–0	Armenia	
9 June 1999	UEFA Euro 2000 qualifying Group 4	(Armenia); Yerevan	Armenia	0–0	Ukraine	
18 August 1999	Friendly	(Estonia); Pärnu	Estonia	4–0	Armenia	
4 September 1999	UEFA Euro 2000 qualifying Group 4	(Russia); Moscow	Russia	2–0	Armenia	
8 September 1999	UEFA Euro 2000 qualifying Group 4	(Armenia); Yerevan	Armenia	2–3	France	Karapet Mikaelyan, Armen Shahgeldyan
9 October 1999	UEFA Euro 2000 qualifying Group 4	(Andorra); Aixovall	Andorra	0–3	Armenia	Arthur Petrosyan, Tigran Yesayan, Armen Shahgeldyan
