= Kostas Fasouliotis =

Cypriot footballer (born 1970)

Personal information
- Date of birth: 19 August 1970 (age 56)
- Position: Midfielder

Senior career*
Years	Team	Apps	(Gls)
1990–2000	APOEL FC		
2000–2001	Enosis Neon Paralimni FC		
2001–2002	AEK Larnaca FC		

International career
1991–1997	Cyprus	14	(1)
- * Club domestic league appearances and goals

Kostas Fasouliotis (born 19 August 1970) is a retired Cypriot football midfielder.
