= Razmik Grigoryan (footballer) =

Armenian footballer

Personal information
- Full name: Razmik Grigoryan
- Date of birth: 11 October 1971 (age 55)
- Place of birth: Yerevan, Soviet Armenia
- Height: 1.77 m (5 ft 10 in)
- Position: Midfielder

Senior career*
| Years | Team | Apps | (Gls) |
| 1991–1994 | Ararat Yerevan | 70 | (31) |
| 1994–1995 | CSKA Sofia | 14 | (2) |
| 1995–1996 | Ararat Yerevan | 18 | (1) |
| 1996–1997 | Spartak Varna | 3 | (0) |
| 1997–1998 | FC Yerevan | 27 | (5) |
| 1998–1999 | Tsement Ararat | 20 | (6) |
| 2000–2000 | Ararat Yerevan | 6 | (0) |
| 2000–2001 | Spartak Yerevan | 19 | (6) |

International career^{‡}
| 1994–1999 | Armenia | 14 | (2) |
- * Club domestic league appearances and goals as of 28 April 2008 ‡ National team caps and goals as of 28 April 2008

Razmik Grigoryan (Armenian: Ռազմիկ Գրիգորյան, born 11 October 1971) is an Armenian football midfielder. He was a member of the Armenia national team, and has participated in 14 international matches and scored 2 goals since his debut on 15 May 1994 in an away friendly match against the USA. He scored the first official goal for the Armenia national team after independence on 10 May 1995.

== Career statistics ==
=== International goals ===
| # | Date | Venue | Opponent | Score | Result | Competition |
|---|---|---|---|---|---|---|
| 1. | 10 May 1995 | Hrazdan Stadium, Yerevan, Armenia | North Macedonia | 2–2 | Draw | Euro 1996 qualifying |
| 2. | 6 September 1995 | Gradski Stadion, Skopje, Macedonia | North Macedonia | 1–2 | Win | Euro 1996 qualifying |
Correct as of 13 January 2017
