= Armenia national football team results (2020–present) =

This article provides details of international football games played by the Armenia national football team from 2020 to present.

== Results ==
Key
Win
Draw
Defeat

=== 2020 ===
5 September 2020 2020–21 Nations League	North Macedonia	2–1	Armenia	Skopje, North Macedonia
15:00 UTC+2	Alioski 5' (pen.); Nestorovski 38' (pen.)	Report	Barseghyan 90+4' (pen.)	Stadium: Toše Proeski Arena; Attendance: 0 (Note: Due to the COVID-19 pandemic in Europe, all matches scheduled for September 2020 were played behind closed doors.); Referee: Irfan Peljto (Bosnia and Herzegovina)

8 September 2020 2020–21 Nations League	Armenia	2–0	Estonia	Yerevan, Armenia
20:00 UTC+4	Karapetian 43'; Wbeymar 65'	Report		Stadium: Vazgen Sargsyan Republican Stadium; Attendance: 0 Referee: David Coote (England)

11 October 2020 2020–21 Nations League	Armenia	2–2	Georgia	Tychy, Poland
18:00 UTC+2	Bayramyan 6'; Mkhitaryan 89' (pen.)	Report	Kacharava 46'; Okriashvili 74'	Stadium: Tychy City Stadium (Note: The Armenia v Georgia match, originally scheduled to be played at Vazgen Sargsyan Republican Stadium, Yerevan, was later moved to the neutral Tychy City Stadium, Tychy, due to the Nagorno-Karabakh conflict.); Attendance: 0 Referee: Ivan Bebek (Croatia)

14 October 2020 2020–21 Nations League	Estonia	1–1	Armenia	Tallinn, Estonia
21:45 UTC+3	Sappinen 14'	Report	K. Hovhannisyan 8'	Stadium: A. Le Coq Arena; Attendance: 1,007; Referee: Luis Godinho (Portugal)

15 November 2020 2020–21 Nations League	Georgia	1–2	Armenia	Tbilisi, Georgia
21:00 UTC+4	Qazaishvili 65' (pen.)	Report	Ghazaryan 33'; Adamyan 86'	Stadium: Boris Paichadze Dinamo Arena; Attendance: 0 Referee: Marco Guida (Italy)

18 November 2020 2020–21 Nations League	Armenia	1–0	North Macedonia	Nicosia, Cyprus
21:00 UTC+4	Hambardzumyan 55'	Report		Stadium: GSP Stadium (Note: The Armenia v North Macedonia match, originally scheduled to be played at Vazgen Sargsyan Republican Stadium, Yerevan, was later moved to a neutral GSP Stadium, Nicosia, as UEFA announced on 20 October 2020 to temporarily suspend all UEFA matches taking place in Armenia and Azerbaijan until further notice due to the Nagorno-Karabakh conflict.); Attendance: 0 Referee: Bobby Madden (Scotland)

=== 2021 ===
25 March 2021 2022 World Cup qualification	Liechtenstein	0–1	Armenia	Vaduz, Liechtenstein
20:45 UTC+1		Report	Frommelt 83' (o.g.)	Stadium: Rheinpark Stadion; Attendance: 0 Referee: Julian Weinberger (Austria)

28 March 2021 2022 World Cup qualification	Armenia	2–0	Iceland	Yerevan, Armenia
20:00 UTC+4	Barseghyan 53'; Bayramyan 74'	Report		Stadium: Vazgen Sargsyan Republican Stadium; Attendance: 4,300; Referee: Enea Jorgji (Albania)

31 March 2021 2022 World Cup qualification	Armenia	3–2	Romania	Yerevan, Armenia
20:00 UTC+4	Spertsyan 56'; Haroyan 87'; Barseghyan 89' (pen.)	Report	Cicâldău 62', 72'	Stadium: Vazgen Sargsyan Republican Stadium; Attendance: 4,300; Referee: Andris Treimanis (Latvia)

1 June 2021 Friendly	Croatia	1–1	Armenia	Velika Gorica, Croatia
18:00 UTC+2	Perišić 24'	Report	Wbeymar 72'	Stadium: Gradski stadion Attendance: 0 Referee: Luka Bilbija (Bosnia and Herzegovina)

5 June 2021 Friendly	Sweden	3–1	Armenia	Solna, Sweden
20:45 UTC+2	Forsberg 16'; Danielson 34'; Berg 85'	Report	Bichakhchyan 64'	Stadium: Friends Arena; Attendance: 500; Referee: Mattias Gestranius (Finland)

2 September 2021 2022 World Cup qualification	North Macedonia	0–0	Armenia	Skopje, North Macedonia
20:45		Report		Stadium: Toše Proeski Arena; Attendance: 3,147; Referee: Artur Soares Dias (Portugal)

5 September 2021 2022 World Cup qualification	Germany	6–0	Armenia	Stuttgart, Germany
20:45	Gnabry 6', 15'; Reus 35'; Werner 45'; Hofmann 52'; Adeyemi 90+1'	Report		Stadium: Mercedes-Benz Arena; Attendance: 18,086; Referee: Willie Collum (Scotland)

8 September 2021 2022 World Cup qualification	Armenia	1–1	Liechtenstein	Yerevan, Armenia
20:00	Mkhitaryan 45+5' (pen.)	Report	N. Frick 80'	Stadium: Vazgen Sargsyan Republican Stadium; Attendance: 14,400; Referee: Duje Strukan (Croatia)

8 October 2021 2022 World Cup qualification	Iceland	1–1	Armenia	Reykjavík, Iceland
18:45	Jóhannesson 77'	Report	Hovhannisyan 35'	Stadium: Laugardalsvöllur; Attendance: 1,697; Referee: Nikola Dabanović (Montenegro)

11 October 2021 2022 World Cup qualification	Romania	1–0	Armenia	Bucharest, Romania
21:45	Mitriță 26'	Report		Stadium: Stadionul Steaua; Attendance: 13,576; Referee: Daniele Orsato (Italy)

11 November 2021 2022 World Cup qualification	Armenia	0–5	North Macedonia	Yerevan, Armenia
21:00		Report	Trajkovski 22'; Bardhi 36', 66' (pen.), 90' (pen.); Ristovski 79'	Stadium: Vazgen Sargsyan Republican Stadium; Attendance: 7,200; Referee: José María Sánchez (Spain)

14 November 2021 2022 World Cup qualification	Armenia	1–4	Germany	Yerevan, Armenia
21:00	Mkhitaryan 59' (pen.)	Report	Havertz 15'; Gündoğan 45+4' (pen.), 50'; Hofmann 64'	Stadium: Vazgen Sargsyan Republican Stadium; Attendance: 12,800; Referee: François Letexier (France)

=== 2022 ===
24 March 2022 Friendly	Armenia	1–0	Montenegro	Yerevan, Armenia
20:00 UTC+4	Bichakhchyan 19'	Report		Stadium: Vazgen Sargsyan Republican Stadium; Attendance: 4,000; Referee: Andris Treimanis (Latvia)

29 March 2022 Friendly	Norway	9–0	Armenia	Oslo, Norway
19:00 UTC+2	Haaland 24', 45+1'; King 28' (pen.), 33', 59'; Thorstvedt 30'; Dæhli 80'; Sørloth 86', 90+1'	Report		Stadium: Ullevaal Stadion; Attendance: 9,032; Referee: Mads-Kristoffer Kristoffersen (Denmark)

4 June 2022 2022–23 Nations League	Armenia	1–0	Republic of Ireland	Yerevan, Armenia
20:00 UTC+4	Spertsyan 74'	Report		Stadium: Vazgen Sargsyan Republican Stadium; Attendance: 10,600; Referee: Radu Petrescu (Romania)

8 June 2022 2022–23 Nations League	Scotland	2–0	Armenia	Glasgow, Scotland
14:00 UTC+1	Ralston 28'; McKenna 40'	Report		Stadium: Hampden Park; Attendance: 38,627; Referee: Sebastian Gishamer (Austria)

11 June 2022 2022–23 Nations League	Ukraine	3–0	Armenia	Łódź, Poland
15:00 UTC+2	Malinovskyi 61'; Karavayev 77'; Mykolenko 84'	Report		Stadium: Stadion Miejski ŁKS (Note: Due to the Russian invasion of Ukraine, Ukraine were required to play their home matches at neutral venues until further notice.); Attendance: 12,503; Referee: Daniel Stefański (Poland)

14 June 2022 2022–23 Nations League	Armenia	1–4	Scotland	Yerevan, Armenia
21:00 UTC+4	Bichakhchyan 6'	Report	Armstrong 14', 45+1'; McGinn 50'; Adams 54'	Stadium: Vazgen Sargsyan Republican Stadium; Attendance: 13,500; Referee: Nikola Dabanović (Montenegro)

24 September 2022 2022–23 Nations League	Armenia	0–5	Ukraine	Yerevan, Armenia
17:00 UTC+4		Report	Tymchyk 22'; Zubkov 57'; Dovbyk 69', 84'; Ihnatenko 81'	Stadium: Vazgen Sargsyan Republican Stadium; Attendance: 7,200; Referee: João Pinheiro (Portugal)

27 September 2022 2022–23 Nations League	Republic of Ireland	3–2	Armenia	Dublin, Ireland
19:45 UTC+1	Egan 18'; Obafemi 52'; Brady 90+1' (pen.)	Report	Dashyan 71'; Spertsyan 73'	Stadium: Aviva Stadium; Attendance: 41,719; Referee: Rade Obrenovič (Slovenia)

16 November 2022 Friendly	Kosovo	2–2	Armenia	Pristina, Kosovo
18:00 UTC+1	L. M. Kastrati 67' (pen.); Rrudhani 90+3'	Report	Shaghoyan 24'; K. Hovhannisyan 82'	Stadium: Fadil Vokrri Stadium; Attendance: 2,000; Referee: Eldorjan Hamiti (Albania)

19 November 2022 Friendly	Albania	2–0	Armenia	Tirana, Albania
17:30 UTC+1	Skuka 28'; Asllani 64' (pen.)	Report		Stadium: Arena Kombëtare; Referee: Aleksandar Stavrev (North Macedonia)

=== 2023 ===
25 March 2023 Euro 2024 qualifying	Armenia	1–2	Turkey	Yerevan, Armenia
21:00 UTC+4	Kabak 10' (o.g.)	Report	Kökçü 34'; Aktürkoğlu 64'	Stadium: Vazgen Sargsyan Republican Stadium; Attendance: 14,125; Referee: José María Sánchez Martínez (Spain)

28 March 2023 Friendly	Armenia	2–2	Cyprus	Yerevan, Armenia
19:00 UTC+4	Ranos 50', 59'	Report	Karo 43'; Christofi 83'	Stadium: Vazgen Sargsyan Republican Stadium; Referee: Dumitru Muntean (Moldova)

16 June 2023 Euro 2024 qualifying	Wales	2–4	Armenia	Cardiff, Wales
19:45 UTC+1	D. James 10'; Wilson 72'	Report	Zelarayán 19', 75'; Ranos 30', 66'	Stadium: Cardiff City Stadium; Attendance: 32,774; Referee: Georgi Kabakov (Bulgaria)

19 June 2023 Euro 2024 qualifying	Armenia	2–1	Latvia	Yerevan, Armenia
20:00 UTC+4	Tiknizyan 35'; Barseghyan 90+1' (pen.)	Report	Mkrtchyan 67' (o.g.)	Stadium: Vazgen Sargsyan Republican Stadium; Attendance: 13,450; Referee: Peter Kráľovič (Slovakia)

8 September 2023 Euro 2024 qualifying	Turkey	1–1	Armenia	Eskişehir, Turkey
21:45 UTC+3	Yıldırım 88'	Report	Dashyan 49'	Stadium: New Eskişehir Stadium; Attendance: 31,740; Referee: Daniele Orsato (Italy)

11 September 2023 Euro 2024 qualifying	Armenia	0–1	Croatia	Yerevan, Armenia
20:00 UTC+4		Report	Kramarić 14'	Stadium: Vazgen Sargsyan Republican Stadium; Attendance: 14,233; Referee: Clément Turpin (France)

12 October 2023 Euro 2024 qualifying	Latvia	2–0	Armenia	Riga, Latvia
21:45 UTC+3	Ikauneiks 39'; Balodis 68'	Report		Stadium: Skonto Stadium; Attendance: 5,128; Referee: Rade Obrenovič (Slovenia)

17 October 2023 Friendly	North Macedonia	3–1	Armenia	Strumica, North Macedonia
17:00 UTC+2	Trajkovski 43'; Ristovski 59'; Daci 88'	Report	Spertsyan 90+4'	Stadium: Stadion Blagoj Istatov; Attendance: 2,075; Referee: Nikola Dabanović (Montenegro)

18 November 2023 Euro 2024 qualifying	Armenia	1–1	Wales	Yerevan, Armenia
18:00 UTC+4	Zelarayán 5'	Report	Tiknizyan 45+2' (o.g.)	Stadium: Vazgen Sargsyan Republican Stadium; Attendance: 14,271; Referee: Benoît Bastien (France)

21 November 2023 Euro 2024 qualifying	Croatia	1–0	Armenia	Zagreb, Croatia
20:45 UTC+1	Budimir 43'	Report		Stadium: Stadion Maksimir; Attendance: 20,398; Referee: Ivan Kružliak (Slovakia)

=== 2024 ===
22 March 2024 Friendly	Armenia	0–1	Kosovo	Yerevan, Armenia
20:00 UTC+4		Report	Rashica 25'	Stadium: Vazgen Sargsyan Republican Stadium; Attendance: 10,000; Referee: Irakli Kvirikashvili (Georgia)

26 March 2024 Friendly	Czech Republic	2–1	Armenia	Prague, Czech Republic
20:00 UTC+1	Krejčí 45+2'; Chorý 77'	Report	Sevikyan 14'	Stadium: Stadion Letná; Attendance: 16,158; Referee: Julian Weinberger (Austria)

4 June 2024 Friendly	Slovenia	2–1	Armenia	Ljubljana, Slovenia
18:00 UTC+2	Mlakar 11'; Iličić 63'	Report	Haroyan 56'	Stadium: Stožice Stadium; Attendance: 8,389; Referee: Andreas Argyrou (Cyprus)

7 June 2024 Friendly	Armenia	2–1	Kazakhstan	Yerevan, Armenia
20:00 UTC+4	Marochkin 4' (o.g.) Bichakhchyan 58'	Report	Islamkhan 90+6' (pen.)	Stadium: Vazgen Sargsyan Republican Stadium; Referee: Goga Kikacheishvili (Georgia)

7 September 2024 2024–25 Nations League	Armenia	4–1	Latvia	Yerevan, Armenia
20:00 UTC+4	Bichakhchyan 6'; Dubra 35' (o.g.); Zelarayán 48'; Spertsyan 86'	Report	Arutyunyan 9' (o.g.)	Stadium: Vazgen Sargsyan Republican Stadium; Attendance: 12,437; Referee: Nenad Minaković (Serbia)

10 September 2024 2024–25 Nations League	North Macedonia	2–0	Armenia	Skopje, North Macedonia
20:45 UTC+2	Bardhi 70'; Miovski 78'	Report		Stadium: Toše Proeski Arena; Attendance: 6,829; Referee: Harm Osmers (Germany)

10 October 2024 2024–25 Nations League	Faroe Islands	2–2	Armenia	Tórshavn, Faroe Islands
19:45 UTC+1	Benjaminsen 37'; Bjartalíð 85'	Report	Zelarayán 44'; Manvelyan 90+3'	Stadium: Tórsvøllur; Attendance: 1,852; Referee: Oleksii Derevinskyi (Ukraine)

13 October 2024 2024–25 Nations League	Armenia	0–2	North Macedonia	Yerevan, Armenia
20:00 UTC+4		Report	Miovski 72'; Alimi 85'	Stadium: Vazgen Sargsyan Republican Stadium; Attendance: 14,371; Referee: Stuart Attwell (England)

14 November 2024 2024–25 Nations League	Armenia	0–1	Faroe Islands	Yerevan, Armenia
21:00 UTC+4		Report	Davidsen 33' (pen.)	Stadium: Vazgen Sargsyan Republican Stadium; Attendance: 6,043; Referee: Tasos Sidiropoulos (Greece)

17 November 2024 2024–25 Nations League	Latvia	1–2	Armenia	Riga, Latvia
16:00 UTC+2	Uldriķis 70'	Report	Spertsyan 48'; Miranyan 74'	Stadium: Skonto Stadium; Attendance: 5,543; Referee: Georgi Kabakov (Bulgaria)

=== 2025 ===
20 March 2025 2024–25 Nations League promotion play-offs	Armenia	0–3	Georgia	Yerevan, Armenia
21:00 UTC+4		Report	Kochorashvili 32'; Mikautadze 37', 59'	Stadium: Vazgen Sargsyan Republican Stadium; Attendance: 14,414; Referee: Radu Petrescu (Romania)

23 March 2025 2024–25 Nations League promotion play-offs	Georgia	6–1 (9–1 agg.)	Armenia	Tbilisi, Georgia
18:00 UTC+4	Haroyan 4' (o.g.); Mikautadze 14', 35'; Chakvetadze 23'; Kiteishvili 27'; Kvaratskhelia 62'	Report	Sevikyan 48'	Stadium: Boris Paichadze Dinamo Arena; Attendance: 47,903; Referee: Anthony Taylor (England)

6 June 2025 Friendly	Kosovo	5–2	Armenia	Pristina, Kosovo
19:00 UTC+2	Dellova 23'; Vojvoda 61' (pen.); Emërllahu 72'; Al. Rrahmani 90', 90+3'	Report	Saipi 8' (o.g.); Spertsyan 28'	Stadium: Fadil Vokrri Stadium; Attendance: 2,000; Referee: Juxhin Xhaja (Albania)

9 June 2025 Friendly	Montenegro	2–2	Armenia	Podgorica, Montenegro
20:00 UTC+2	Adžić 5'; Bulatović 52'	Report	Spertsyan 1', 81'	Stadium: Podgorica City Stadium; Attendance: 1,398; Referee: Jasmin Šabotić (Luxembourg)

6 September 2025 2026 World Cup qualification	Armenia	0–5	Portugal	Yerevan, Armenia
20:00 UTC+4		Report	Félix 10', 62'; Ronaldo 21', 46'; Cancelo 32'	Stadium: Vazgen Sargsyan Republican Stadium; Attendance: 14,403; Referee: Anthony Taylor (England)

9 September 2025 2026 World Cup qualification	Armenia	2–1	Republic of Ireland	Yerevan, Armenia
20:00 UTC+4	Spertsyan 45+1' (pen.); Ranos 51'	Report	Ferguson 57'	Stadium: Vazgen Sargsyan Republican Stadium; Attendance: 13,144; Referee: Goga Kikacheishvili (Georgia)

11 October 2025 2026 World Cup qualification	Hungary	2–0	Armenia	Budapest, Hungary
18:00 UTC+2	Lukács 56'; Gruber 90+4'	Report		Stadium: Puskás Aréna; Attendance: 57,285; Referee: Chris Kavanagh (England)

14 October 2025 2026 World Cup qualification	Republic of Ireland	1–0	Armenia	Dublin, Ireland
19:45 UTC+1	Ferguson 70'	Report		Stadium: Aviva Stadium; Attendance: 42,292; Referee: Benoît Bastien (France)

13 November 2025 2026 World Cup qualification	Armenia	0–1	Hungary	Yerevan, Armenia
21:00 UTC+4		Report	Varga 33'	Stadium: Vazgen Sargsyan Republican Stadium; Attendance: 14,247; Referee: José María Sánchez (Spain)

16 November 2025 2026 World Cup qualification	Portugal	9–1	Armenia	Porto, Portugal
14:00 UTC+0	Veiga 7'; Ramos 28'; J. Neves 30', 41', 81'; Fernandes 45+3' (pen.), 52', 72' (pen.); Conceição 90+2'	Report	Spertsyan 18'	Stadium: Estádio do Dragão; Attendance: 46,702; Referee: Irfan Peljto (Bosnia and Herzegovina)

=== 2026 ===
29 March 2026 Friendly	Armenia	1–2	Belarus	Yerevan, Armenia
18:00 UTC+4	Bichakhchyan 88' (pen.)	Report	Yablonski 8'; Tiknizyan 72' (o.g.)	Stadium: Vazgen Sargsyan Republican Stadium; Attendance: 11,483; Referee: Dumitru Muntean (Moldova)

6 June 2026 Friendly	Armenia	1–1	Kazakhstan	Yerevan, Armenia
18:00 UTC+4	Spertsyan 54'	Report	Samorodov 50'	Stadium: Vazgen Sargsyan Republican Stadium; Attendance: 8,400; Referee: Kyriakos Athanasiou (Cyprus)

9 June 2026 Friendly	Armenia	1–1	Moldova	Yerevan, Armenia
19:00 UTC+4	Serobyan 89'	Report	Bogaciuc 90+1'	Stadium: Vazgen Sargsyan Republican Stadium; Attendance: 6,000; Referee: Aleko Aptsiauri (Georgia)

25 September 2026 2026–27 Nations League	Armenia	2–0	Latvia	Yerevan, Armenia
20:00 UTC+4	Arutyunyan 31'; Gharibyan 75'	Report		Stadium: Vazgen Sargsyan Republican Stadium; Attendance: 11,093; Referee: Martin Matoša (Slovenia)

28 September 2026 2026–27 Nations League	Armenia	2–3	Montenegro	Yerevan, Armenia
20:00 UTC+4	Serobyan 34'; Spertsyan 65'	Report	Piloyan 20' (o.g.); Krstović 38'; Latković 89'	Stadium: Vazgen Sargsyan Republican Stadium; Attendance: 11,400; Referee: José Luis Munuera Montero (Spain)

2 October 2026 2026–27 Nations League	Cyprus	2–0	Armenia	Nicosia, Cyprus
21:45 UTC+3	Konomis 19'; Kakoullis 31'	Report		Stadium: GSP Stadium; Attendance: 3,456; Referee: Mohammad Al-Emara (Finland)

5 October 2026 2026–27 Nations League	Montenegro	0–0	Armenia	Podgorica, Montenegro
20:45 UTC+2		Report		Stadium: Podgorica City Stadium; Attendance: 9,700; Referee: Manfredas Lukjančukas (Lithuania)

12 November 2026 2026–27 Nations League	Armenia	1–1	Cyprus	Yerevan, Armenia
21:00 UTC+4	Garibyan 58'	Report	Pikis 9'	Stadium: Vazgen Sargsyan Republican Stadium; Attendance: 7,000; Referee: Orel Grinfeld (Israel)

15 November 2026 2026–27 Nations League	Latvia	0–0	Armenia	Riga, Latvia
15:00 UTC+2		Report		Stadium: Skonto Stadium; Attendance: 5,355; Referee: Vasilios Fotias (Greece)

== Upcoming matches ==
The following matches are currently scheduled:
